= 2026 Valencia P1 =

Premier Padel tournament held in Valencia

- Date: 6 – 14 June
- Edition: 1st
- Category: P1
- Prize money: €479.068
- Location: Valencia, Spain
- Venue: Pavelló Municipal Font de Sant Lluís
- Court speed: Medium

Champions
- Men's doubles: (Argentina) Agustín Tapia (Spain) Arturo Coello
- Women's doubles: (Spain) Ariana Sánchez (Spain) Andrea Ustero

Chronology

The 2026 Valencia P1 (officially 2026 Premier Padel Valencia P1) was the tenth tournament of the fifth season organized by Premier Padel, the premier padel circuit, promoted by the International Padel Federation, and with the financial backing of Nasser Al-Khelaïfi's Qatar Sports Investments.

In the women's category, for the first time this season, neither of the top two pairs in the FIP rankings reached the finals, instead the match was contested by the third and fourth seeds. In the finals, Ariana Sánchez and Andrea Ustero defeated Claudia Fernández and Sofia Araújo in three sets, claiming their second title of 2026.

In the men's category, the top two pairs on the FIP rankings reached the final for the fourth consecutive tournament, marking the seventh time this season. In the title match, Agustín Tapia and Arturo Coello defeated Alejandro Galán and Federico Chingotto following a third-set tiebreak, securing their fourth title of 2026.

== Seeds ==
Male

Rnk.	Team	FIP Ranking Points
1	(Argentina) Agustín Tapia (Spain) Arturo Coello	40794
2	(Spain) Alejandro Galán (Argentina) Federico Chingotto	36268
3	(Argentina) Franco Stupaczuk (Spain) Mike Yanguas	14199
4	(Spain) Juan Lebrón (Argentina) Leandro Augsburguer	13604
5	(Spain) Coki Nieto (Spain) Jon Sanz	10923
6	(Argentina) Martín Di Nenno (Spain) Paquito Navarro	10608
7	(Spain) Francisco Guerrero (Spain) Javi Leal	8826
8	(Brazil) Lucas Bergamini (Spain) Javi Garrido	6678
9	(Brazil) Lucas Campagnolo (Spain) Momo González	6566
10	(Spain) Alejandro Ruiz (Spain) Juanlu Esbri	4872
11	(Spain) Aimar Goñi (Spain) Eduardo Alonso	4807
12	(Spain) Alejandro Arroyo (Argentina) Leonel Aguirre	4548
13	(Spain) Javier Garcia Mora (Spain) Jose Jimenez Casas	4508
14	(Argentina) Juan Tello (Spain) Maximiliano Arce	4418
15	(United Arab Emirates) Inigo Jofre (Spain) Jairo Bautista	4285
16	(Argentina) Gonzalo Alfonso (Spain) Javier Barahona	4285

Female

Rnk.	Team	FIP Ranking Points
1	(Argentina) Delfina Brea (Spain) Gemma Triay	35514
2	(Spain) Bea González (Spain) Paula Josemaria	29353
3	(Spain) Ariana Sánchez (Spain) Andrea Ustero	20481
4	(Spain) Claudia Fernandéz (Portugal) Sofia Araújo	18823
5	(Argentina) Claudia Jensen (Spain) Tamara Icardo	11903
6	(Spain) Marta Ortega (Spain) Martina Calvo	10846
7	(Spain) Alejandra Alonso (Spain) Alejandra Salazar	10206
8	(Spain) Marina Guinart (Spain) Veronica Virseda	8721
9	(Spain) Beatriz Caldera (Spain) Carmen Goenaga	7078
10	(Argentina) Aranzazu Osoro (Spain) Victoria Iglesias	6756
11	(Argentina) Martina Fassio Goyeneche (Spain) Raquel Eugenio Barrera	5048
12	(Spain) Jessica Castelló (Spain) Lorena Rufo	4668
13	(Italy) Carolina Orsi (Spain) Patricia Llaguno	4666
14	(Spain) Jimena Velasco (Spain) Marta Barrera	4056
15	(Spain) Lucía Sainz (Spain) Jana Montes Cabruja	4010
16	(France) Alix Collombon (Russia) Ksenia Sharifova	3459

== Head-to-head record between teams ranked in the top 4 during the season ==
=== Men's ===
Record	Coello–Tapia	Galán–Chingotto	Stupaczuk–Yanguas	Augsburger–Lebrón
Coello–Tapia	—	3–4	5–0	4–1
Galán–Chingotto	4–3	—	2–0	3–1
Stupaczuk–Yanguas	0–5	0–2	—	—
Augsburger–Lebrón	1–4	1–3	—	—

=== Women's ===
Record	D. Brea–Triay	B. González–Paula	Ariana–Ustero	Araúijo–C. Fernandez
D. Brea–Triay	—	1–5	3–2	3–0
B. González–Paula	5–1	—	3–3	2–0
Ariana–Ustero	2–3	3–3	—	1–0
Araúijo–C. Fernandez	0–3	0–2	0–1	—

== Draws ==
=== Men's Bracket ===
Round of 32
1	(Spain) Coello / (Argentina) Tapia	7	6
34	(Argentina) L. Capra / (Spain) L.H. Quesada	5	4
37	(Italy) A. Montiel / (Italy) F. Abbate	4	5
10	(Spain) A. Ruiz / (Spain) J. Esbri	6	7
15	(United Arab Emirates) I. Jofre / (Spain) J. Bautista	6	6	6
20	(Spain) P.G. Rodrigo / (Spain) P. Lijó	7	2	1
27	(Spain) A.F. Lancha / (Spain) E. Goenaga	3	5
5	(Spain) Coki / (Spain) J. Sanz	6	7
6	(Argentina) Di Nenno / (Spain) Paquito	7	7
Q	(Spain) Á. Amaya / (Spain) J.L. Gonzalez	5	6
28	(Spain) D. Santigosa / (Spain) M. Sintes	6	6
16	(Argentina) G. Alfonso / (Spain) J. Barahona	4	4
13	(Spain) J.G. Mora / (Spain) J.J. Casas	6	6
25	(Spain) A. Cepero / (Argentina) E. Torre	2	2
Q	(Italy) A. Patiniotis / (Spain) M. Benitez	1	4
3	(Argentina) Stupaczuk / (Spain) Yanguas	6	6
4	(Spain) Lebrón / (Argentina) L. Augsburger	6	7
33	(Spain) F. Gil (Spain) M. Castaño	4	6
23	(Argentina) I. Piotto / (Spain) J.G. Diestro	3	6	7
11	(Spain) A. Goñi / (Spain) E. Alonso	6	4	5
12	(Spain) A. Arroyo / (Argentina) L. Aguirre	3	3
35	(Argentina) F. Mourino / (Spain) M. Quilez	6	6
24	(Spain) M. Ortega / (Spain) V. Ruiz	1	6	0
7	(Spain) F. Guerrero / (Spain) J. Leal	6	3	6
8	(Spain) J. Garrido / (Brazil) L. Bergamini	2	6	7
18	(Argentina) M. Blasco / (Argentina) Sanyo	6	2	5
29	(Spain) A. Martinez / (Argentina) J. De Pascual	2	3
14	(Argentina) J. Tello / (Argentina) M. Arce	6	6
9	(Brazil) L. Campagnolo / (Spain) Momo	6	1
17	(Argentina) A. Chozas / (Argentina) V. Libaak	7	4	*
Q	(Spain) F. Cabeza / (Paraguay) M. San Martin	4	7	2
2	(Argentina) Chingotto / (Spain) Galán	6	6	6

Round of 16
1	(Spain) Coello / (Argentina) Tapia	6	6
10	(Spain) A. Ruiz / (Spain) J. Esbri	4	1
15	(United Arab Emirates) I. Jofre / (Spain) J. Bautista	2	7	6
5	(Spain) Coki / (Spain) J. Sanz	6	6	7
6	(Argentina) Di Nenno / (Spain) Paquito	6	6
28	(Spain) D. Santigosa / (Spain) M. Sintes	1	3
13	(Spain) J.G. Mora / (Spain) J.J. Casas	6	6
3	(Argentina) Stupaczuk / (Spain) Yanguas	7	7
4	(Spain) Lebrón / (Argentina) L. Augsburger	6	6
23	(Argentina) I. Piotto / (Spain) J.G. Diestro	3	2
35	(Argentina) F. Mourino / (Spain) M. Quilez	3	2
7	(Spain) F. Guerrero / (Spain) J. Leal	6	6
8	(Spain) J. Garrido / (Brazil) L. Bergamini	6	6	6
14	(Argentina) J. Tello / (Argentina) M. Arce	7	3	7
17	(Argentina) A. Chozas / (Argentina) V. Libaak	6	5	4
2	(Argentina) Chingotto / (Spain) Galán	2	7	6

Quarter-Final
1	(Spain) Coello / (Argentina) Tapia	6	6
5	(Spain) Coki / (Spain) J. Sanz	4	4
6	(Argentina) Di Nenno / (Spain) Paquito	5	6
3	(Argentina) Stupaczuk / (Spain) Yanguas	7	7
4	(Spain) Lebrón / (Argentina) L. Augsburger	6	6
7	(Spain) F. Guerrero / (Spain) J. Leal	4	4
14	(Argentina) J. Tello / (Argentina) M. Arce	1	1
2	(Argentina) Chingotto / (Spain) Galán	6	6

Semi-Finals
1	(Spain) Coello / (Argentina) Tapia	6	6
3	(Argentina) Stupaczuk / (Spain) Yanguas	2	2
4	(Spain) Lebrón / (Argentina) L. Augsburger	6	3	4
2	(Argentina) Chingotto / (Spain) Galán	4	6	6

Finals
1	(Spain) Coello / (Argentina) Tapia	6	6	7
2	(Argentina) Chingotto / (Spain) Galán	7	1	6

=== Women's Bracket ===
Round of 32
1	(Argentina) D. Brea / (Spain) G. Triay
Bye
17	(Argentina) J. Bidahorria / (Spain) M. Caparros	1	6	4
Q	(Spain) B. Las Heras / (Spain) C. Mesa	6	3	6
WC	(Italy) M. Parmigiani / (Italy) S. Errani	4	4
20	(Spain) T. Navarro / (Argentina) V. Riera	6	6
18	(Spain) A. Perez / (Spain) L. Martinez	3	1
8	(Spain) M. Guinart / (Spain) V. Virseda	6	2	*
7	(Spain) A. Salazar / (Spain) A. Alonso	1	0
11	(Argentina) M. Goyeneche / (Spain) R. Barrera	6	6
9	(Spain) B. Caldera / (Spain) C. Goenaga	6	7
19	(Spain) M.R. Abajo / (Spain) N. Canovas	2	5
13	(Italy) C. Orsi / (Spain) P. Llaguno	5	6	7
10	(Argentina) A. Osoro / (Spain) V. Iglesias	7	0	6
Bye
3	(Spain) A. Ustero / (Spain) A. Sánchez
4	(Spain) C. Fernández / (Portugal) S. Araújo
Bye
22	(Italy) G. Dal Pozzo / (Spain) N. Rodriguez	6	5	4
21	(Spain) A. Martinez / (Spain) L. Luján	2	7	6
16	(France) A. Collombon / (Russia) K. Sharifova	5	6
Q	(Spain) A.D. Gracia / (Argentina) D. Valenzuela	7	7
23	(Spain) M. Talavan / (Spain) S. Saiz	1	4
5	(Argentina) C. Jensen / (Spain) T. Icardo	6	6
6	(Spain) M. Ortega / (Spain) M. Calvo	6	6
12	(Spain) J. Castelló / (Spain) L. Rufo	1	1
Q	(Spain) A. Cañellas / (France) L. Godallier	6	4	7
15	(Spain) J. Montes / (Spain) L. Sainz	2	6	6
14	(Spain) J. Velasco / (Spain) M. Barrera	6	6
Q	(Spain) L. Manquillo / (Spain) N. Aguilar	4	4
Bye
2	(Spain) B. González / (Spain) P. Josemaria

Round of 16
1	(Argentina) D. Brea / (Spain) G. Triay	6	7
Q	(Spain) B. Las Heras / (Spain) C. Mesa	1	5
20	(Spain) T. Navarro / (Argentina) V. Riera	7	0	0
8	(Spain) M. Guinart / (Spain) V. Virseda	5	6	6
11	(Argentina) M. Goyeneche / (Spain) R. Barrera	6	7	4
9	(Spain) B. Caldera / (Spain) C. Goenaga	7	5	6
13	(Italy) C. Orsi / (Spain) P. Llaguno	3	2
3	(Spain) A. Ustero / (Spain) A. Sánchez	6	6
4	(Spain) C. Fernández / (Portugal) S. Araújo	7	6
21	(Spain) A. Martinez / (Spain) L. Luján	6	3
Q	(Spain) A.D. Gracia / (Argentina) D. Valenzuela	1	0
5	(Argentina) C. Jensen / (Spain) T. Icardo	6	6
6	(Spain) M. Ortega / (Spain) M. Calvo	6	6
Q	(Spain) A. Cañellas / (France) L. Godallier	3	2
14	(Spain) J. Velasco / (Spain) M. Barrera	3	4
2	(Spain) B. González / (Spain) P. Josemaria	6	6

Quarter-Final
1	(Argentina) D. Brea / (Spain) G. Triay	6	6
8	(Spain) M. Guinart / (Spain) V. Virseda	3	4
9	(Spain) B. Caldera / (Spain) C. Goenaga	3	4
3	(Spain) A. Ustero / (Spain) A. Sánchez	6	6
4	(Spain) C. Fernández / (Portugal) S. Araújo	6	6
5	(Argentina) C. Jensen / (Spain) T. Icardo	1	1
6	(Spain) M. Ortega / (Spain) M. Calvo	7	7
2	(Spain) B. González / (Spain) P. Josemaria	5	6

Semi-Finals
1	(Argentina) D. Brea / (Spain) G. Triay	5	6	4
3	(Spain) A. Ustero / (Spain) A. Sánchez	7	2	6
4	(Spain) C. Fernández / (Portugal) S. Araújo	6	6
6	(Spain) M. Ortega / (Spain) M. Calvo	3	2

Finals
3	(Spain) A. Ustero / (Spain) A. Sánchez	6	3	6
4	(Spain) C. Fernández / (Portugal) S. Araújo	4	6	2

== Results ==
=== First Round ===
Men's

Date	Winners	Score	Opponent	Refs.
8/6/2026	(Argentina) Luciano Capra (Spain) Luis Hernandez Quesada	7–6 / 6–4	(United Arab Emirates) Arnau Ayats (Italy) Denis Perino	
8/6/2026	(Italy) Alvaro Montiel Caruso (Italy) Flavio Abbate	7–6 / 6–7 / 7–5	(Spain) Diego Garcia Garcia (Spain) Santiago Pineda Cabello	
8/6/2026	(Spain) Pablo Garcia Rodrigo (Spain) Pablo Lijó	3–6 / 6–2 / 6–1	(Portugal) Miguel Deus (Portugal) Nuno Deus	
8/6/2026	(Spain) Andres Fernandez Lancha (Spain) Enrique Goenaga	3–6 / 7–6 / 6–2	(Spain) Guillermo Collado (Spain) Pol Hernandez	
8/6/2026	(Spain) Álvaro Mélendez Amaya (Spain) Jose Luis Gonzalez	6–4 / 6–2	(Italy) Facundo Dominguez (Spain) Teodoro Zapata	
8/6/2026	(Spain) Daniel Santigosa (Spain) Marc Sintes	6–4 / 6–2	(Argentina) Franco Dal Bianco (Argentina) Maximo Jesus Maldonado	
8/6/2026	(Spain) Álvaro Cepero (Argentina) Eduardo Agustín Torre	6–0 / 6–2	(Spain) Gonzalo Rubio (Spain) Javier Ruiz	
8/6/2026	(Italy) Aris Patiniotis (Spain) Miguel Benitez	2–6 / 7–6 / 6–3	(Spain) Albert Roglan Pons (Spain) Manuel Aragon Herrera	
8/6/2026	(Spain) Francisco Gil Morales (Spain) Manuel Castaño	6–4 / 4–6 / 7–6	(Spain) Adrian Naranjo Martinez (Spain) Pablo Sanchez Vicente	
8/6/2026	(Argentina) Ignacio Piotto (Spain) Jose Garcia Diestro	6–4 / 7–6	(Sweden) Adam Axelsson (Spain) Rodrigo Coello	
8/6/2026	(Argentina) Federico Mourino (Spain) Marc Quilez	7–5 / 6–1	(Argentina) Juan Rubini (Argentina) Maxi Sánchez	
8/6/2026	(Spain) Mario Ortega (Spain) Victor Ruiz	7–6 / 6–3	(Spain) Ignacio Sager (Argentina) Juan Cruz Belluati	
8/6/2026	(Argentina) Maximiliano Sánchez Blasco (Argentina) Sanyo Gutiérrez	6–2 / 6–0	(Spain) Christian Fuster (Spain) Miguel Angel Solbes	
8/6/2026	(Spain) Alonso Rodriguez Martinez (Argentina) Juan De Pascual	6–3 / 6–7 / 6–2	(United Arab Emirates) Ignacio Vilariño (Spain) Mario Del Castillo	
8/6/2026	(Argentina) Alex Chozas (Argentina) Valentino Libaak	6–4 / 6–4	(Spain) Marcos Gonzalez Blanco (Paraguay) Martin Abud	
8/6/2026	(Spain) Francisco Cabeza (Paraguay) Mariano San Martin	6–3 / 6–2	(Spain) Jose Rico (Argentina) Juan Cruz Forastello	

=== Round of 32 ===
Men's

Date	Winners	Score	Opponent	Refs.
10/6/2026	(Argentina) Agustín Tapia (Spain) Arturo Coello	7–5 / 6–4	(Argentina) Luciano Capra (Spain) Luis Hernandez Quesada	
10/6/2026	(Spain) Aléx Ruiz (Spain) Juanlu Esbri	6–4 / 7–5	(Italy) Alvaro Montiel Caruso (Italy) Flavio Abbate	
9/6/2026	(United Arab Emirates) Inigo Jofre (Spain) Jairo Bautista	6–7 / 6–2 / 6–1	(Spain) Pablo Garcia Rodrigo (Spain) Pablo Lijó	
9/6/2026	(Spain) Coki Nieto (Spain) Jon Sanz	6–3 / 7–5	(Spain) Andres Fernandez Lancha (Spain) Enrique Goenaga	
9/6/2026	(Argentina) Martin Di Nenno (Spain) Paquito Navarro	7–5 / 7–6	(Spain) Álvaro Mélendez Amaya (Spain) Jose Luis Gonzalez	
9/6/2026	(Spain) Daniel Santigosa (Spain) Marc Sintes	6–4 / 6–4	(Argentina) Gonzalo Alfonso (Spain) Javier Barahona	
9/6/2026	(Spain) Javier Garcia Mora (Spain) Jose Jimenez Casas	6–2 / 6–2	(Spain) Álvaro Cepero (Argentina) Eduardo Agustín Torre	
9/6/2026	(Argentina) Franco Stupaczuk (Spain) Mike Yanguas	6–1 / 6–4	(Italy) Aris Patiniotis (Spain) Miguel Benitez	
10/6/2026	(Spain) Juan Lebrón (Argentina) Leandro Augsburger	6–4 / 7–6	(Spain) Francisco Gil Morales (Spain) Manuel Castaño	
10/6/2026	(Argentina) Ignacio Piotto (Spain) Jose Garcia Diestro	3–6 / 6–4 / 7–5	(Spain) Aimar Goñi (Spain) Eduardo Alonso	
9/6/2026	(Argentina) Federico Mourino (Spain) Marc Quilez	6–3 / 6–3	(Spain) Alex Arroyo (Argentina) Leonel Aguirre	
9/6/2026	(Spain) Francisco Guerrero (Spain) Javi Leal	6–1 / 3–6 / 6–0	(Spain) Mario Ortega (Spain) Victor Ruiz	
10/6/2026	(Spain) Javi Garrido (Brazil) Lucas Bergamini	2–6 / 6–2 / 7–5	(Argentina) Maximiliano Sánchez Blasco (Argentina) Sanyo Gutiérrez	
10/6/2026	(Argentina) Juan Tello (Argentina) Maximiliano Arce	6–2 / 6–3	(Spain) Alonso Rodriguez Martinez (Argentina) Juan De Pascual	
10/6/2026	(Argentina) Alex Chozas (Argentina) Valentino Libaak	7–6 / 4–1 / W.O.	(Brazil) Lucas Campagnolo (Spain) Momo González	
10/6/2026	(Spain) Alejandro Galán (Argentina) Federico Chingotto	6–4 / 6–7 / 6–2	(Spain) Francisco Cabeza (Paraguay) Mariano San Martin	

Women's

Date	Winners	Score	Opponent	Refs.
10/6/2026	(Spain) Barbara Las Heras (Spain) Carla Mesa	6–1 / 3–6 / 6–4	(Argentina) Julieta Bidahorria (Spain) Marta Caparros	
9/6/2026	(Spain) Teresa Navarro (Argentina) Virginia Riera	6–4 / 6–4	(Italy) Martina Parmigiani (Italy) Sara Errani	
9/6/2026	(Spain) Marina Guinart (Spain) Verónica Virseda	6–3 / 2–1 / W.O.	(Spain) Agueda Perez (Spain) Lucia Martinez	
10/6/2026	(Argentina) Martina Fassio Goyeneche (Spain) Raquel Eugenio Barrera	6–1 / 6–0	(Spain) Alejandra Alonso (Spain) Alejandra Salazar	
9/6/2026	(Spain) Beatriz Caldera (Spain) Carmen Goenaga	6–2 / 7–5	(Spain) Maria Rodriguez Abajo (Spain) Noa Canovas	
9/6/2026	(Italy) Carolina Orsi (Spain) Patricia Llaguno	5–7 / 6–0 / 7–6	(Argentina) Aranzazu Osoro (Spain) Victoria Iglesias	
10/6/2026	(Spain) Araceli Martinez (Spain) Laura Luján	2–6 / 7–5 / 6–4	(Italy) Giulia Dal Pozzo (Spain) Nuria Rodriguez	
10/6/2026	(Spain) Ana Dominguez Gracia (Argentina) Daiara Agustina Valenzuela	7–5 / 7–6	(France) Alix Collombon (Russia) Ksenia Sharifova	
9/6/2026	(Argentina) Claudia Jensen (Spain) Tamara Icardo	6–1 / 6–4	(Spain) Marta Talavan (Spain) Sofía Saiz Vallejo	
10/6/2026	(Spain) Marta Ortega (Spain) Martina Calvo	6–1 / 6–1	(Spain) Jessica Castelló (Spain) Lorena Rufo	
10/6/2026	(Spain) Ariadna Cañellas (France) Lea Godallier	6–2 / 4–6 / 7–6	(Spain) Lucía Sainz (Spain) Jana Montes	
10/6/2026	(Spain) Jimena Velasco (Spain) Marta Barrera	6–4 / 6–4	(Spain) Letizia Manquillo (Spain) Noemi Aguilar	

=== Round of 16 ===
Men's

Date	Winners	Score	Opponent	Refs.
11/6/2026	(Argentina) Agustín Tapia (Spain) Arturo Coello	6–4 / 6–1	(Spain) Aléx Ruiz (Spain) Juanlu Esbri	
11/6/2026	(Spain) Coki Nieto (Spain) Jon Sanz	6–2 / 6–7 / 7–6	(United Arab Emirates) Inigo Jofre (Spain) Jairo Bautista	
11/6/2026	(Argentina) Martin Di Nenno (Spain) Paquito Navarro	6–1 / 6–3	(Spain) Daniel Santigosa (Spain) Marc Sintes	
11/6/2026	(Argentina) Franco Stupaczuk (Spain) Mike Yanguas	7–6 / 7–6	(Spain) Javier Garcia Mora (Spain) Jose Jimenez Casas	
11/6/2026	(Spain) Juan Lebrón (Argentina) Leandro Augsburger	6–3 / 6–2	(Argentina) Ignacio Piotto (Spain) Jose Garcia Diestro	
11/6/2026	(Spain) Francisco Guerrero (Spain) Javi Leal	6–3 / 6–2	(Argentina) Federico Mourino (Spain) Marc Quilez	
11/6/2026	(Argentina) Juan Tello (Argentina) Maximiliano Arce	7–6 / 3–6 / 7–6	(Spain) Javi Garrido (Brazil) Lucas Bergamini	
11/6/2026	(Spain) Alejandro Galán (Argentina) Federico Chingotto	2–6 / 7–5 / 6–4	(Argentina) Alex Chozas (Argentina) Valentino Libaak	

Women's

Date	Winners	Score	Opponent	Refs.
11/6/2026	(Argentina) Delfina Brea (Spain) Gemma Triay	6–1 / 7–5	(Spain) Barbara Las Heras (Spain) Carla Mesa	
11/6/2026	(Spain) Marina Guinart (Spain) Verónica Virseda	5–7 / 6–0 / 6–0	(Spain) Teresa Navarro (Argentina) Virginia Riera	
11/6/2026	(Spain) Beatriz Caldera (Spain) Carmen Goenaga	7–6 / 5–7 / 6–4	(Argentina) Martina Fassio Goyeneche (Spain) Raquel Eugenio Barrera	
11/6/2026	(Spain) Andrea Ustero (Spain) Ariana Sánchez	6–3 / 6–2	(Italy) Carolina Orsi (Spain) Patricia Llaguno	
11/6/2026	(Spain) Claudia Fernández (Portugal) Sofia Araújo	7–6 / 6–3	(Spain) Araceli Martinez (Spain) Laura Luján	
11/6/2026	(Argentina) Claudia Jensen (Spain) Tamara Icardo	6–1 / 6–0	(Spain) Ana Dominguez Gracia (Argentina) Daiara Agustina Valenzuela	
11/6/2026	(Spain) Marta Ortega (Spain) Martina Calvo	6–3 / 6–2	(Spain) Ariadna Cañellas (France) Lea Godallier	
11/6/2026	(Spain) Bea González (Spain) Paula Josemaría	6–3 / 6–4	(Spain) Jimena Velasco (Spain) Marta Barrera	

=== Quarter-Finals ===
Men's

Date	Winners	Score	Opponent	Refs.
12/6/2026	(Argentina) Agustín Tapia (Spain) Arturo Coello	6–4 / 6–4	(Spain) Coki Nieto (Spain) Jon Sanz	
12/6/2026	(Argentina) Franco Stupaczuk (Spain) Mike Yanguas	7–5 / 7–6	(Argentina) Martin Di Nenno (Spain) Paquito Navarro	
12/6/2026	(Spain) Juan Lebrón (Argentina) Leandro Augsburger	6–4 / 6–4	(Spain) Francisco Guerrero (Spain) Javi Leal	
12/6/2026	(Spain) Alejandro Galán (Argentina) Federico Chingotto	6–1 / 6–1	(Argentina) Juan Tello (Argentina) Maximiliano Arce	

Women's

Date	Winners	Score	Opponent	Refs.
12/6/2026	(Argentina) Delfina Brea (Spain) Gemma Triay	6–3 / 6–4	(Spain) Marina Guinart (Spain) Verónica Virseda	
12/6/2026	(Spain) Andrea Ustero (Spain) Ariana Sánchez	6–3 / 6–4	(Spain) Beatriz Caldera (Spain) Carmen Goenaga	
12/6/2026	(Spain) Claudia Fernández (Portugal) Sofia Araújo	6–1 / 6–1	(Argentina) Claudia Jensen (Spain) Tamara Icardo	
12/6/2026	(Spain) Marta Ortega (Spain) Martina Calvo	7–5 / 7–6	(Spain) Bea González (Spain) Paula Josemaría	

=== Semi-Finals ===
Men's

Date	Winners	Score	Opponent	Refs.
13/6/2026	(Argentina) Agustín Tapia (Spain) Arturo Coello	6–2 / 6–2	(Argentina) Franco Stupaczuk (Spain) Mike Yanguas	
13/6/2026	(Spain) Alejandro Galán (Argentina) Federico Chingotto	4–6 / 6–3 / 6–4	(Spain) Juan Lebrón (Argentina) Leandro Augsburger	

Women's

Date	Winners	Score	Opponent	Refs.
13/6/2026	(Spain) Andrea Ustero (Spain) Ariana Sánchez	7–5 / 2–6 / 6–4	(Argentina) Delfina Brea (Spain) Gemma Triay	
13/6/2026	(Spain) Claudia Fernández (Portugal) Sofia Araújo	6–3 / 6–2	(Spain) Marta Ortega (Spain) Martina Calvo	

=== Finals ===
Men's

Date	Winners	Score	Opponent	Refs.
14/6/2026	(Argentina) Agustín Tapia (Spain) Arturo Coello	6–7 / 6–1 / 7–6	(Spain) Alejandro Galán (Argentina) Federico Chingotto	

Women's

Date	Winners	Score	Opponent	Refs.
14/6/2026	(Spain) Andrea Ustero (Spain) Ariana Sánchez	6–4 / 3–6 / 6–2	(Spain) Claudia Fernández (Portugal) Sofia Araújo	
