= 2026 Germany P2 =

Premier Padel tournament held in Düsseldorf, Germany

- Date: 4–11 October
- Edition: 2nd
- Category: P2
- Prize money: €264,534
- Location: Düsseldorf, Germany
- Venue: Castello Düsseldorf
- Court speed: Slow

Champions
- Men's doubles: (Argentina) Agustín Tapia (Spain) Arturo Coello
- Women's doubles: (Spain) Claudia Fernandéz (Spain) Martina Calvo

Chronology

The 2026 Germany P2 (officially 2026 Premier Padel Cupra Germany P2) is the nineteenth tournament of the fifth season organized by Premier Padel, the premier padel circuit, promoted by the International Padel Federation, and with the financial backing of Nasser Al-Khelaïfi's Qatar Sports Investments.

In the women's category, for the third time this season, neither of the top two pairs in the FIP rankings reached the final, with the third and fourth-seeded pairs repeating the Paris Major final. In the title match, Claudia Fernandéz and Martina Calvo gave Andrea Ustero and Ariana Sánchez no chance, securing their second title of the season, and their first-ever Germany P2 victory, in what was their fourth final appearance across the last six tournaments.

In the men's category, Franco Stupaczuk and Jon Sanz repeated their Rotterdam feat, eliminating Alejandro Galán and Federico Chingotto again in the semifinals, marking the fifth time in the last seven tournaments that a pair ranked outside the top two knocked out one of the top two seeds to reach the final. In the decisive match, Agustín Tapia and Arturo Coello, who played their 16th final out of 18 tournaments they competed, defeated Sanz and Stupaczuk in straight sets, thereby securing their third consecutive title (their eleventh of 2026) and becoming champions on Germany soil for the first time.

== Relevant Data ==
=== Coki and Yanguas Out ===
After reaching the semifinals in Rotterdam, where they faced Franco Stupaczuk and Jon Sanz, Coki Nieto and Mike Yanguas were forced to withdraw from the Germany P2 tournament (for which they were registered) due to physical issues affecting Coki, with their spot being awarded to a "lucky loser."

== Seeds ==
Male

Rnk.	Team	FIP Ranking Points
1	(Argentina) Agustín Tapia (Spain) Arturo Coello	40766
2	(Spain) Alejandro Galán (Argentina) Federico Chingotto	36012
3	(Spain) Juan Lebrón (Argentina) Leandro Augsburguer	15386
4	(Argentina) Franco Stupaczuk (Spain) Jon Sanz	11346
5	(Argentina) Martín Di Nenno (Spain) Paquito Navarro	11307
6	(Spain) Coki Nieto (Spain) Mike Yanguas	10557
7	(Spain) Francisco Guerrero (Spain) Javi Leal	8767
8	(Brazil) Lucas Campagnolo (Spain) Momo González	7979
9	(Argentina) Juan Tello (Argentina) Maximiliano Arce	5505
10	(Spain) Jairo Bautista (Brazil) Lucas Bergamini	5434
11	(Spain) Aimar Goñi (Spain) Eduardo Alonso	5291
12	(Spain) Alejandro Ruiz (Spain) Javier Garcia Mora	4977
13	(United Arab Emirates) Inigo Jofre (Spain) Juanlu Esbri	4894
14	(Spain) Alejandro Arroyo (Spain) Jose Jimenez Casas	4670
15	(Argentina) Gonzalo Alfonso (Argentina) Valentino Libaak	4478
16	(Spain) Javi Garrido (Argentina) Juan De Pascual	4272

Female

Rnk.	Team	FIP Ranking Points
1	(Argentina) Delfina Brea (Spain) Gemma Triay	33326
2	(Spain) Bea González (Spain) Paula Josemaria	27657
3	(Spain) Ariana Sánchez (Spain) Andrea Ustero	24144
4	(Spain) Claudia Fernandéz (Spain) Martina Calvo	19269
5	(Spain) Marta Ortega (Portugal) Sofia Araújo	11942
6	(Spain) Alejandra Alonso (Spain) Marina Guinart	8996
7	(Spain) Alejandra Salazar (Argentina) Aranzazu Osoro	7880
8	(Argentina) Claudia Jensen (Spain) Noa Canovas	7420
9	(Spain) Lorena Rufo (Spain) Victoria Iglesias	5032
10	(Italy) Giulia Dal Pozzo (Spain) Nuria Rodriguez	4943
11	(Italy) Carolina Orsi (Spain) Patricia Llaguno	4919
12	(Spain) Jimena Velasco (Spain) Raquel Barrera	4853
13	(Spain) Jana Montes (Spain) Marta Barrera	4128
14	(Spain) Jessica Castelló (Spain) Maria Rodriguez Abajo	4088
15	(Spain) Letizia Manquillo (Spain) Lucía Sainz	4015
16	(Spain) Araceli Martinez (Spain) Lucia Martinez	3114

== Head-to-head record between teams ranked in the top 4 during the season ==
=== Men's ===
Record	Coello–Tapia	Galán–Chingotto	Augsburger–Lebrón	Sanz–Stupaczuk	Former Pairs	Di Nenno–Paquito	Stupaczuk–Yanguas
Coello–Tapia	—	7–4	8–1	2–0		2–0	5–0
Galán–Chingotto	4–7	—	4–2	0–2		3–0	3–0
Augsburger–Lebrón	1–8	2–4	—	—		0–1	—
Sanz–Stupaczuk	0–2	2–0	—	—		1–1	—
Former Pairs							
Di Nenno–Paquito	0–2	0–3	1–0	1–1		—	1–2
Stupaczuk–Yanguas	0–5	0–3	—	—		2–1	—

=== Women's ===
Record	D. Brea–Triay	B. González–Paula	Ariana–Ustero	C. Fernández–M. Calvo	Former Pairs	Araúijo–C. Fernández
D. Brea–Triay	—	3–5	6–5	1–2		3–0
B. González–Paula	5–3	—	4–4	2–3		2–0
Ariana–Ustero	5–6	4–4	—	1–1		1–0
C. Fernández–M. Calvo	2–1	3–2	1–1	—		—
Former Pairs
Araúijo–C. Fernández	0–3	0–2	0–1	—		—

== Draws ==
=== Men's Bracket ===
Round of 32
1	(Spain) Coello / (Argentina) Tapia
Bye
Q	(Argentina) F. Mouriño / (Spain) M. Quilez	3	6	3
22	(Spain) J.G. Diestro / (Spain) M. Sintes	6	3	6
Q	(Spain) J. Marmolejo / (Argentina) R. Pereyra	6	6
WC	(Germany) A. Reca / (Spain) V. Tur Checa	1	3
15	(Argentina) G. Alfonso / (Argentina) V. Libaak	3	7	7
7	(Spain) F. Guerrero / (Spain) J. Leal	6	6	5
8	(Brazil) L. Campagnolo / (Spain) Momo	5	6
9	(Argentina) J. Tello / (Argentina) M. Arce	7	7
19	(Argentina) I. Piotto / (Spain) J. Barahona	3	4
Q	(Belgium) C. Geens / (Spain) N. Moragues	6	6
20	(Spain) E. Goenaga / (Spain) G. Collado	6	3	6
13	(United Arab Emirates) I. Jofre / (Spain) J. Esbri	4	6	7
Bye
3	(Spain) Lebrón / (Argentina) L. Augsburger
4	(Argentina) F. Stupaczuk / (Spain) J. Sanz
Bye
WC	(Germany) J. Lindmeyer / (Germany) M. Wunner	0	3
Q	(Spain) J. Martinez / (Spain) L.H. Quesada	6	6
14	(Spain) A. Arroyo / (Spain) J.J. Casas	3	2
21	(Spain) M. Castaño / (Spain) P.H Álvarez	6	6
11	(Spain) A. Goñi / (Spain) E. Alonso	4	4
5	(Argentina) Di Nenno / (Spain) Paquito	6	6
LL	(Italy) A. Montiel / (Spain) D. Santigosa	7	7
10	(Spain) J. Bautista / (Brazil) L. Bergamini	5	6
18	(Spain) D.G. Sánchez / (Italy) E. Jensen	6	1
17	(Argentina) M. Blasco / (Argentina) Sanyo	7	6
16	(Spain) J. Garrido / (Argentina) J. De Pascual	6	6
12	(Spain) A. Ruiz / (Spain) J.G. Mora	1	2
Bye
2	(Argentina) Chingotto / (Spain) Galán

Round of 16
1	(Spain) Coello / (Argentina) Tapia	6	6
22	(Spain) J.G. Diestro / (Spain) M. Sintes	2	3
Q	(Spain) J. Marmolejo / (Argentina) R. Pereyra	3	4
15	(Argentina) G. Alfonso / (Argentina) V. Libaak	6	6
9	(Argentina) J. Tello / (Argentina) M. Arce	7	6
Q	(Belgium) C. Geens / (Spain) N. Moragues	5	3
13	(United Arab Emirates) I. Jofre / (Spain) J. Esbri	6	3	3
3	(Spain) Lebrón / (Argentina) L. Augsburger	3	6	6
4	(Argentina) F. Stupaczuk / (Spain) J. Sanz	6	6
Q	(Spain) J. Martinez / (Spain) L.H. Quesada	3	3
21	(Spain) M. Castaño / (Spain) P.H Álvarez	0	3
5	(Argentina) Di Nenno / (Spain) Paquito	6	6
LL	(Italy) A. Montiel / (Spain) D. Santigosa	2	2
17	(Argentina) M. Blasco / (Argentina) Sanyo	6	6
16	(Spain) J. Garrido / (Argentina) J. De Pascual	6	1	5
2	(Argentina) Chingotto / (Spain) Galán	4	6	7

Quarter-Final
1	(Spain) Coello / (Argentina) Tapia	6	7
15	(Argentina) G. Alfonso / (Argentina) V. Libaak	2	5
9	(Argentina) J. Tello / (Argentina) M. Arce	3	3
3	(Spain) Lebrón / (Argentina) L. Augsburger	6	6
4	(Argentina) F. Stupaczuk / (Spain) J. Sanz	6	6
5	(Argentina) Di Nenno / (Spain) Paquito	3	3
17	(Argentina) M. Blasco / (Argentina) Sanyo	4	1
2	(Argentina) Chingotto / (Spain) Galán	6	6

Semi-Finals
1	(Spain) Coello / (Argentina) Tapia	6	6
3	(Spain) Lebrón / (Argentina) L. Augsburger	2	3
4	(Argentina) F. Stupaczuk / (Spain) J. Sanz	7	6
2	(Argentina) Chingotto / (Spain) Galán	6	4

Finals
1	(Spain) Coello / (Argentina) Tapia	6	7
4	(Argentina) F. Stupaczuk / (Spain) J. Sanz	2	6

=== Women's Bracket ===
Round of 32
1	(Argentina) D. Brea / (Spain) G. Triay
Bye
13	(Spain) J. Montes / (Spain) M. Barrera	6	7
Q	(Spain) A. Cañellas / (Spain) P. Martinez	0	6
11	(Italy) C. Orsi / (Spain) P. Llaguno	3	7	6
Q	(Spain) M. Borrero / (Spain) T. Navarro	6	6	1
Bye
8	(Argentina) C. Jensen / (Spain) N. Canovas
7	(Spain) A. Salazar / (Argentina) A. Osoro
Bye
WC	(Germany) K. Hering / (Germany) L. Pluemer	3	2
16	(Spain) A. Martinez / (Spain) L. Martinez	6	6
12	(Spain) J. Velasco / (Spain) R. Barrera	4	7	6
18	(France) A. Collombon / (Russia) K. Sharifova	6	6	0
Bye
3	(Spain) A. Ustero / (Spain) A. Sánchez
4	(Spain) C. Fernández / (Spain) M. Calvo
Bye
Q	(Spain) C. Escacena / (Spain) N. Aguilar	6	4	6
LL	(Italy) C. Baldi / (Italy) C. Aima	4	6	1
Q	(Italy) G. Marchetti / (Spain) L. Arruabarrena	2	4
9	(Spain) L. Rufo / (Spain) V. Iglesias	6	6
Bye
5	(Spain) M. Ortega / (Portugal) S. Araújo
6	(Spain) A. Alonso / (Spain) M. Guinart
Bye
14	(Spain) J. Castelló / (Spain) M.R. Abajo	6	6
LL	(Spain) A.D. Gracia / (Spain) S. Bellver	2	1
15	(Spain) L. Manquillo / (Spain) L. Sainz	2	2
17	(Spain) M. Talavan / (Spain) S. Saiz	6	6
Bye
2	(Spain) B. González / (Spain) P. Josemaria

Round of 16
1	(Argentina) D. Brea / (Spain) G. Triay	7	6
13	(Spain) J. Montes / (Spain) M. Barrera	6	1
11	(Italy) C. Orsi / (Spain) P. Llaguno	6	1
8	(Argentina) C. Jensen / (Spain) N. Canovas	7	6
7	(Spain) A. Salazar / (Argentina) A. Osoro	7	6	7
16	(Spain) A. Martinez / (Spain) L. Martinez	5	7	6
12	(Spain) J. Velasco / (Spain) R. Barrera	6	3	1
3	(Spain) A. Ustero / (Spain) A. Sánchez	4	6	6
4	(Spain) C. Fernández / (Spain) M. Calvo	6	6
Q	(Spain) C. Escacena / (Spain) N. Aguilar	2	0
9	(Spain) L. Rufo / (Spain) V. Iglesias	4	4
5	(Spain) M. Ortega / (Portugal) S. Araújo	6	6
6	(Spain) A. Alonso / (Spain) M. Guinart	7	5	7
14	(Spain) J. Castelló / (Spain) M.R. Abajo	5	7	5
17	(Spain) M. Talavan / (Spain) S. Saiz	4	4
2	(Spain) B. González / (Spain) P. Josemaria	6	6

Quarter-Final
1	(Argentina) D. Brea / (Spain) G. Triay	6	6
8	(Argentina) C. Jensen / (Spain) N. Canovas	3	1
7	(Spain) A. Salazar / (Argentina) A. Osoro	1	1
3	(Spain) A. Ustero / (Spain) A. Sánchez	6	6
4	(Spain) C. Fernández / (Spain) M. Calvo	6	6
5	(Spain) M. Ortega / (Portugal) S. Araújo	0	3
6	(Spain) A. Alonso / (Spain) M. Guinart	0	1
2	(Spain) B. González / (Spain) P. Josemaria	6	6

Semi-Finals
1	(Argentina) D. Brea / (Spain) G. Triay	5	6	5
3	(Spain) A. Ustero / (Spain) A. Sánchez	7	3	7
4	(Spain) C. Fernández / (Spain) M. Calvo	6	5	7
2	(Spain) B. González / (Spain) P. Josemaria	4	7	6

Finals
3	(Spain) A. Ustero / (Spain) A. Sánchez	3	0
4	(Spain) C. Fernández / (Spain) M. Calvo	6	6

== Results ==
=== Round of 32 ===
Men's

Date	Winners	Score	Opponent	Refs.
7/10/2026	(Spain) Jose Garcia Diestro (Spain) Marc Sintes	6–3 / 3–6 / 6–3	(Argentina) Federico Mouriño (Spain) Marc Quilez	
7/10/2026	(Spain) Jose Solano Marmolejo (Argentina) Ramiro Pereyra	6–1 / 6–3	(Germany) Agustin Reca (Spain) Victor Tur Checa	
7/10/2026	(Argentina) Gonzalo Alfonso (Argentina) Valentino Libaak	3–6 / 7–6 / 7–5	(Spain) Francisco Guerrero (Spain) Javi Leal	
6/10/2026	(Argentina) Juan Tello (Argentina) Maximiliano Arce	7–5 / 7–6	(Brazil) Lucas Campagnolo (Spain) Momo González	
7/10/2026	(Belgium) Clement Geens (Spain) Nacho Moragues	6–3 / 6–4	(Argentina) Ignacio Piotto (Spain) Javier Barahona	
7/10/2026	(United Arab Emirates) Inigo Jofre (Spain) Juanlu Esbri	4–6 / 6–3 / 7–6	(Spain) Enrique Goenaga (Spain) Guillermo Collado	
7/10/2026	(Spain) Javier Martinez (Spain) Luis Hernandez Quesada	6–0 / 6–3	(Germany) Johannes Lindmeyer (Germany) Matthias Wunner	
6/10/2026	(Spain) Manuel Castaño (Spain) Pol Hernandez Alvarez	6–3 / 6–2	(Spain) Alejandro Arroyo (Spain) Jose Jimenez Casas	
6/10/2026	(Argentina) Martin Di Nenno (Spain) Paquito Navarro	6–4 / 6–4	(Spain) Aimar Goñi (Spain) Eduardo Alonso	
6/10/2026	(Italy) Alvaro Montiel (Spain) Daniel Santigosa	7–5 / 7–6	(Spain) Jairo Bautista (Brazil) Lucas Bergamini	
6/10/2026	(Argentina) Maxi Sánchez Blasco (Argentina) Sanyo Gutiérrez	7–6 / 6–1	(Spain) David Gala Sánchez (Italy) Enzo Jensen	
6/10/2026	(Spain) Javi Garrido (Argentina) Juan De Pascual	6–1 / 6–2	(Spain) Alejandro Ruiz (Spain) Javier Garcia Mora	

Women's

Date	Winners	Score	Opponent	Refs.
7/10/2026	(Spain) Jana Montes (Spain) Marta Barrera	6–0 / 7–6	(Spain) Ariadna Cañellas (Spain) Patricia Martinez	
7/10/2026	(Italy) Carolina Orsi (Spain) Patricia Llaguno	3–6 / 7–6 / 6–1	(Spain) Marta Borrero (Spain) Teresa Navarro	
7/10/2026	(Spain) Araceli Martinez (Spain) Lucia Martinez	6–3 / 6–2	(Germany) Lena Pluemer (Germany) Katharina Hering	
7/10/2026	(Spain) Jimena Velasco (Spain) Raquel Barrera	4–6 / 7–6 / 6–0	(France) Alix Collombon (Russia) Ksenia Sharifova	
7/10/2026	(Spain) Claudia Escacena (Spain) Noemi Aguilar	6–4 / 4–6 / 6–1	(Italy) Caterina Baldi (Italy) Clarissa Aima	
7/10/2026	(Spain) Lorena Rufo (Spain) Victoria Iglesias	6–2 / 6–4	(Italy) Giorgia Marchetti (Spain) Lara Arruabarrena	
7/10/2026	(Spain) Jessica Castelló (Spain) Maria Rodriguez Abajo	6–2 / 6–1	(Spain) Ana Dominguez Gracia (Spain) Sandra Bellver	
7/10/2026	(Spain) Marta Talavan (Spain) Sofia Saiz	6–2 / 6–2	(Spain) Letizia Manquillo (Spain) Lucía Sainz	

=== Round of 16 ===
Men's

Date	Winners	Score	Opponent	Refs.
8/10/2026	(Argentina) Agustín Tapia (Spain) Arturo Coello	6–2 / 6–3	(Spain) Jose Garcia Diestro (Spain) Marc Sintes	
8/10/2026	(Argentina) Gonzalo Alfonso (Argentina) Valentino Libaak	6–3 / 6–4	(Spain) Jose Solano Marmolejo (Argentina) Ramiro Pereyra	
8/10/2026	(Argentina) Juan Tello (Argentina) Maximiliano Arce	7–5 / 6–3	(Belgium) Clement Geens (Spain) Nacho Moragues	
8/10/2026	(Spain) Juan Lebrón (Argentina) Leandro Augsburger	3–6 / 6–3 / 6–3	(United Arab Emirates) Inigo Jofre (Spain) Juanlu Esbri	
8/10/2026	(Argentina) Franco Stupaczuk (Spain) Jon Sanz	6–3 / 6–3	(Spain) Javier Martinez (Spain) Luis Hernandez Quesada	
8/10/2026	(Argentina) Martin Di Nenno (Spain) Paquito Navarro	6–0 / 6–3	(Spain) Manuel Castaño (Spain) Pol Hernandez Alvarez	
8/10/2026	(Argentina) Maxi Sánchez Blasco (Argentina) Sanyo Gutiérrez	6–2 / 6–2	(Italy) Alvaro Montiel (Spain) Daniel Santigosa	
8/10/2026	(Spain) Alejandro Galán (Argentina) Federico Chingotto	4–6 / 6–1 / 7–5	(Spain) Javi Garrido (Argentina) Juan De Pascual	

Women's

Date	Winners	Score	Opponent	Refs.
8/10/2026	(Argentina) Delfina Brea (Spain) Gemma Triay	7–6 / 6–1	(Spain) Jana Montes (Spain) Marta Barrera	
8/10/2026	(Argentina) Claudia Jensen (Spain) Noa Canovas	7–6 / 6–1	(Italy) Carolina Orsi (Spain) Patricia Llaguno	
8/10/2026	(Spain) Alejandra Salazar (Argentina) Aranzazu Osoro	7–5 / 6–7 / 7–6	(Spain) Araceli Martinez (Spain) Lucia Martinez	
8/10/2026	(Spain) Andrea Ustero (Spain) Ariana Sánchez	4–6 / 6–3 / 6–1	(Spain) Jimena Velasco (Spain) Raquel Barrera	
8/10/2026	(Spain) Claudia Fernández (Spain) Martina Calvo	6–2 / 6–0	(Spain) Claudia Escacena (Spain) Noemi Aguilar	
8/10/2026	(Spain) Marta Ortega (Portugal) Sofia Araújo	6–4 / 6–4	(Spain) Lorena Rufo (Spain) Victoria Iglesias	
8/10/2026	(Spain) Alejandra Alonso (Spain) Marina Guinart	7–5 / 5–7 / 7–5	(Spain) Jessica Castelló (Spain) Maria Rodriguez Abajo	
8/10/2026	(Spain) Bea González (Spain) Paula Josemaría	6–4 / 6–4	(Spain) Marta Talavan (Spain) Sofia Saiz	

=== Quarter-Finals ===
Men's

Date	Winners	Score	Opponent	Refs.
9/10/2026	(Argentina) Agustín Tapia (Spain) Arturo Coello	6–2 / 7–5	(Argentina) Gonzalo Alfonso (Argentina) Valentino Libaak	
9/10/2026	(Spain) Juan Lebrón (Argentina) Leandro Augsburger	6–3 / 6–3	(Argentina) Juan Tello (Argentina) Maximiliano Arce	
9/10/2026	(Argentina) Franco Stupaczuk (Spain) Jon Sanz	6–3 / 6–3	(Argentina) Martin Di Nenno (Spain) Paquito Navarro	
9/10/2026	(Spain) Alejandro Galán (Argentina) Federico Chingotto	6–4 / 6–1	(Argentina) Maxi Sánchez Blasco (Argentina) Sanyo Gutiérrez	

Women's

Date	Winners	Score	Opponent	Refs.
9/10/2026	(Argentina) Delfina Brea (Spain) Gemma Triay	6–3 / 6–1	(Argentina) Claudia Jensen (Spain) Noa Canovas	
9/10/2026	(Spain) Andrea Ustero (Spain) Ariana Sánchez	6–1 / 6–1	(Spain) Alejandra Salazar (Argentina) Aranzazu Osoro	
9/10/2026	(Spain) Claudia Fernández (Spain) Martina Calvo	6–0 / 6–3	(Spain) Marta Ortega (Portugal) Sofia Araújo	
9/10/2026	(Spain) Bea González (Spain) Paula Josemaría	6–0 / 6–1	(Spain) Alejandra Alonso (Spain) Marina Guinart	

=== Semi-Finals ===
Men's

Date	Winner	Score	Opponent	Refs.
10/10/2026	(Argentina) Agustín Tapia (Spain) Arturo Coello	6–2 / 6–3	(Spain) Juan Lebrón (Argentina) Leandro Augsburger	
10/10/2026	(Argentina) Franco Stupaczuk (Spain) Jon Sanz	7–6 / 6–4	(Spain) Alejandro Galán (Argentina) Federico Chingotto	

Women's

Date	Winner	Score	Opponent	Refs.
10/10/2026	(Spain) Andrea Ustero (Spain) Ariana Sánchez	6–4 / 5–7 / 7–6	(Argentina) Delfina Brea (Spain) Gemma Triay	
10/10/2026	(Spain) Claudia Fernández (Spain) Martina Calvo	7–5 / 3–6 / 7–5	(Spain) Bea González (Spain) Paula Josemaría	

=== Finals ===
Men's

Date	Winners	Score	Opponent	Refs.
11/10/2026	(Argentina) Agustín Tapia (Spain) Arturo Coello	6–2 / 7–6	(Argentina) Franco Stupaczuk (Spain) Jon Sanz	

Women's

Date	Winners	Score	Opponent	Refs.
11/10/2026	(Spain) Claudia Fernández (Spain) Martina Calvo	6–3 / 6–0	(Spain) Andrea Ustero (Spain) Ariana Sánchez	
