= 2023 Valencia Open =

Padel championships

- Date: 3 July – 9 July
- Edition: 10th
- Category: Open 1000
- Location: Valencia, Spain
- Venue: Pavelló Municipal Font de Sant Lluís

Champions
- Men's doubles: (Argentina) Franco Stupaczuk (Argentina) Martín Di Nenno
- Women's doubles: (Spain) Ariana Sánchez (Spain) Paula Josemaría

Chronology
Previous
Valladolid Master
Next
Italy Major (PP)

The WPT Valencia Open 2023 (officially WPT Adeslas Valencia Open 2023) was the thirteenth tournament of the eleventh edition of World Padel Tour, and the third Master tournament of the season. The final phase will be played between the 3rd and 9th of July 2023 at Pavelló Municipal Font de Sant Lluís, Spain.

In the women's category, Ariana Sánchez and Paula Josemaría claimed their eight title of the season, defeating the number two pair Gemma Triay and Marta Ortega in the finals.

In the men's category, the "Superpibes" Franco Stupaczuk and Martín Di Nenno won their fourth WPT title of the year (their third consecutive), after defeating the number three ranked pair Alejandro Galán and his temporary partner Jon Sanz in the finals, reducing the gap to first place in the ranking..

== Seeded registered teams ==
Male

Rnk.	Team	WPT Ranking Points
1	(Argentina) Agustín Tapia (Spain) Arturo Coello	34.865
2	(Argentina) Franco Stupaczuk (Argentina) Martín Di Nenno	22.140
3	(Spain) Alejandro Galán (Spain) Jon Sanz	17.975
4	(Spain) Momo González (Argentina) Sanyo Gutiérrez	16.235
5	(Argentina) Federico Chingotto (Spain) Paquito Navarro	14.740
6	(Argentina) Fernando Belasteguín (Spain) Miguel Yanguas	12.954
7	(Spain) Alex Ruiz (Argentina) Juan Tello	11.850
8	(Argentina) Lucho Capra (Argentina) Maxi Sánchez	8.103

Female

Rnk.	Team	WPT Ranking Points
1	(Spain) Ariana Sánchez (Spain) Paula Josemaría	40.880
2	(Spain) Gemma Triay (Spain) Marta Ortega	27.880
3	(Spain) Bea González (Argentina) Delfina Brea	15.890
4	(Spain) Tamara Icardo (Argentina) Virginia Riera	13.089
5	(Spain) Majo Sánchez Alayeto (Spain) Mapi Sánchez Alayeto	10.039
6	(Spain) Jessica Castelló (Portugal) Sofia Araújo	9.813
7	(Argentina) Aranza Osoro (Spain) Lucía Sainz	10.643
8	(Argentina) Claudia Jensen (Spain) Verónica Virseda	8.376

== Schedule ==
The final draw was played:

- Tuesday 4 July: Round of 32.
- Wednesday 5 July: Round of 32.
- Thursday 6 July: Round of 16.
- Friday 7 July: Quarterfinals.
- Saturday 8 July: Semifinals.
- Sunday 9 July: Finals.

== Results ==
=== Men's Bracket ===
Round of 32
1	(Spain) Coello / (Argentina) Tapia	6	7
(Brazil) L. Bergamini/ (Spain) V. Ruiz	3	6
(Spain) Coki / (Argentina) J.C. Belluati	2	*
(Spain) M. Quílez / (Argentina) V. Libaak
B	(Spain) C. Marti / (Spain) M. Ortega	6	4	5
(Spain) J. Bautista / (Spain) J.M. Díaz	3	6	7
(Spain) I. Ramírez / (Spain) J. Muñoz	3	7	4
6	(Argentina) Belasteguín / (Spain) Yanguas	6	6	6
8	(Argentina) L. Capra / (Argentina) Maxi	6	6	7
(Spain) R. Méndez / (Spain) T. Bueno	3	7	6
(Spain) J.G. Mora / (Spain) J.G. Barahona	7	1
(Spain) F. Gil / (Argentina) R. Moyano	6	2	*
A	(Spain) E. Alonso / (Spain) J. Esbri	3	6	6
(Spain) A. Ayats / (Spain) F. Guerrero	6	2	4
C	(Spain) A. Marqués / (Spain) M. Huete	1	3
3	(Spain) Galán / (Spain) J. Sanz	6	6
4	(Spain) Momo / (Argentina) Sanyo	7	7
(Spain) J. Leal / (Spain) J. Diestro	6	5
(Argentina) A. Gutiérrez / (Spain) J. Rico	7	6
(Spain) A. Sans / (Spain) T. Zapata	5	3
(Spain) P. Cardona / (Spain) P. Fernandez	6	3	6
(Spain) M. del Castillo / (Spain) M. Benítez	2	6	4
(Spain) J. Garrido / (Spain) P. Lijó	0	2
7	(Spain) A. Ruiz / (Argentina) J. Tello	6	6
5	(Argentina) Chingotto / (Spain) Paquito	6	6	6
(Spain) A. Arroyo / (Spain) G. Rubio	3	7	2
(Argentina) D. Perino / (Argentina) M. Lamperti	6	7
(Spain) I. Vilariño / (Spain) S. Oria	3	6
(Spain) J. Rico / (Argentina) L. Augsburger	7	6
D	(Spain) J. Ruiz / (Spain) J. Martínez	6	2
(Argentina) A. Silingo / (Brazil) Lima	1	2
2	(Argentina) F. Stupaczuk / (Argentina) Di Nenno	6	6

Round of 16
1	{ (Spain) Coello / (Argentina) Tapia	6	6
(Spain) Coki / (Argentina) J.C. Belluati	1	2
(Spain) Jairo Bautista / (Spain) Juan Martín Díaz	6	6
6	(Argentina) F. Belasteguín / (Spain) Yanguas	3	3
8	(Argentina) L. Capra / (Argentina) Maxi	2	7	6
(Spain) F. Gil / (Argentina) R. Moyano	6	6	3
A	(Spain) E. Alonso / (Spain) J. Esbri	3	3
3	(Spain) Galán / (Spain) J. Sanz	6	6
4	(Spain) Momo / (Argentina) Sanyo	6	6
(Argentina) A. Gutiérrez / (Spain) J. Rico	3	4
(Spain) M. del Castillo / (Spain) M. Benítez	2	3
7	(Spain) A. Ruiz / (Argentina) J. Tello	6	6
5	(Argentina) Chingotto / (Spain) Paquito	6	6
(Argentina) D. Perino / (Argentina) M. Lamperti	1	3
(Spain) J. Rico / (Argentina) L. Augsburger	3	6
2	(Argentina) F. Stupaczuk / (Argentina) Di Nenno	6	7

Quarter-Final
1	(Spain) Coello / (Argentina) Tapia	6	6
6	(Argentina) F. Belasteguín / (Spain) Yanguas	3	1
8	(Argentina) L. Capra / (Argentina) Maxi	4	3
3	(Spain) Galán / (Spain) J. Sanz	6	6
4	(Spain) Momo / (Argentina) Sanyo	6	7
7	(Spain) A. Ruiz / (Argentina) J. Tello	4	6
5	(Argentina) Chingotto / (Spain) Paquito	5	7
2	(Argentina) F. Stupaczuk / (Argentina) Di Nenno	7	6

Semi-Finals
1	(Spain) Coello / (Argentina) Tapia	6	6	4
3	(Spain) Galán / (Spain) J. Sanz	3	7	6
7	(Spain) A. Ruiz / (Argentina) J. Tello	5	0
2	(Argentina) F. Stupaczuk / (Argentina) Di Nenno	7	6

Finals
3	(Spain) Galán / (Spain) J. Sanz	3	3
2	(Argentina) F. Stupaczuk / (Argentina) Di Nenno	6	6

=== Women's Bracket ===
Round of 32
1	(Spain) Ariana / (Spain) Paula
Bye
(Spain) N. Rodriguez / (Spain) M. Talaván	6	4	5
(Spain) L. Rufo / (Spain) M. Martínez	4	6	3
(Portugal) A. Nogueira / (Spain) M. Merino	6	6
(Spain) E. Amatriaín / (Spain) S. Saiz	3	1
(Spain) A. Alonso / (Spain) A. Ustero	4	4
8	(Argentina) C. Jensen / (Spain) V. Virseda	6	6
7	(Argentina) A. Osoro / (Spain) L. Sainz	6	6
(Italy) C. Orsi / (Spain) P. Llaguno	3	1
(Spain) A. Cañellas / (Spain) C. Mesa	6	4
D	(Italy) E. Stellato / (Italy) G. Sussarello	7	6
(Spain) C. Fernández / (Argentina) J. Bidahorria	5	6	6
(Spain) E. Carnicero / (Spain) M. Villalba	7	1	1
Bye
3	(Spain) B. González / (Argentina) D. Brea
4	(Spain) T. Icardo / (Argentina) V. Riera
Bye
C	(Spain) J. Velasco / (Spain) N. Canovas	6	6
(Spain) A. Pérez / (Spain) S. Ruiz	7	7
(France) L. Godallier / (Spain) M. Caparros	6	6
B	(Italy) C. Pappacena / (Italy) G. Marchetti	3	4
(Spain) A. Martinez / (Spain) T. Navarro	3	3
6	(Spain) J. Castelló / (Portugal) S. Araújo	6	6
5	(Spain) Majo / (Spain) Mapi	6	6
(Spain) C. Goenaga / (Spain) L. Martínez	0	4
(Spain) B. Caldera / (Spain) M. Barrera	4	2
(Sweden) C. Navarro / (Spain) M. Guinart	6	6
A	(Russia) K. Sharifova / (Spain) M. Borrero	7	6	2
(France) A. Collombon / (Spain) V. Iglesias	6	7	6
Bye
2	(Spain) G. Triay / (Spain) M. Ortega

Round of 16
1	(Spain) Ariana / (Spain) Paula	7	6
(Spain) N. Rodriguez / (Spain) M. Talaván	5	2
(Portugal) A. Nogueira / (Spain) M. Merino	4	1
8	(Argentina) C. Jensen / (Spain) V. Virseda	6	6
7	(Argentina) A. Osoro / (Spain) L. Sainz	6	6
D	(Italy) E. Stellato / (Italy) G. Sussarello	1	2
(Spain) C. Fernández / (Argentina) J. Bidahorria	6	7
3	(Spain) B. González / (Argentina) D. Brea	3	6
4	(Spain) T. Icardo / (Argentina) V. Riera	6	6
(Spain) A. Pérez / (Spain) S. Ruiz	1	0
(France) L. Godallier / (Spain) M. Caparros	6	6	6
6	(Spain) J. Castelló / (Portugal) S. Araújo	7	3	1
5	(Spain) Majo / (Spain) Mapi	3	6	6
(Sweden) C. Navarro / (Spain) M. Guinart	6	3	4
(France) A. Collombon / (Spain) V. Iglesias	3	1
2	(Spain) G. Triay / (Spain) M. Ortega	6	6

Quarter-Final
1	(Spain) A. Sánchez / (Spain) P. Josemaría	6	7
8	(Argentina) C. Jensen / (Spain) V. Virseda	2	5
7	(Argentina) A. Osoro / (Spain) L. Sainz	6	6
(Spain) C. Fernández / (Argentina) J. Bidahorria	2	1
4	(Spain) T. Icardo / (Argentina) V. Riera	6	6
(France) L. Godallier / (Spain) M. Caparros	3	1
5	(Spain) Majo / (Spain) Mapi	3	1
2	(Spain) G. Triay / (Spain) M. Ortega	6	6

Semi-Finals
1	(Spain) Ariana / (Spain) Paula	6	6
7	(Argentina) A. Osoro / (Spain) L. Sainz	4	1
4	(Spain) T. Icardo / (Argentina) V. Riera	1	4
2	(Spain) G. Triay / (Spain) M. Ortega	6	6

Finals
1	(Spain) Ariana / (Spain) Paula	6	6
2	(Spain) G. Triay / (Spain) M. Ortega	3	1

=== Round of 32 ===
Men's

Date	Winners	Score	Opponent	Refs.
4/7/2023	(Argentina) Agustín Tapia (Spain) Arturo Coello	6–3 / 7–6	(Brazil) Lucas Bergamini (Spain) Víctor Ruiz	
4/7/2023	(Spain) Coki Nieto (Argentina) Juan Cruz Belluati	2–0 / W.O.	(Spain) Marc Quílez (Argentina) Valentino Libaak	
4/7/2023	(Spain) Jairo Bautista (Spain) Juan Martín Díaz	3–6 / 6–4 / 7–5	(Spain) Carlos Marti (Spain) Mario Ortega	
4/7/2023	(Argentina) Fernando Belasteguín (Spain) Miguel Yanguas	6–3 / 6–7 / 6–4	(Spain) Iván Ramírez (Spain) Jaime Muñoz	
4/7/2023	(Argentina) Lucho Capra (Argentina) Maxi Sánchez	6–3 / 6–7 / 7–6	(Spain) Rafael Méndez (Spain) Toni Bueno	
4/7/2023	(Spain) Francisco Gil (Argentina) Ramiro Moyano	6–7 / 2–1 / W.O.	(Spain) Javier García Mora (Spain) Javier González Barahona	
4/7/2023	(Spain) Eduardo Alonso (Spain) Juanlu Esbri	3–6 / 6–2 / 6–4	(Spain) Arnau Ayats (Spain) Francisco Guerrero	
4/7/2023	(Spain) Alejandro Galán (Spain) Jon Sanz	6–1 / 6–3	(Spain) Adrian Marqués (Spain) Mario Huete	
4/7/2023	(Spain) Momo González (Argentina) Sanyo Gutiérrez	7–6 / 7–5	(Spain) Javier Leal (Spain) José García Diestro	
4/7/2023	(Argentina) Agustín Gutiérrez (Spain) Josete Rico	7–5 / 6–3	(Spain) Antón Sans (Spain) Teodoro Zapata	
4/7/2023	(Spain) Mario del Castillo (Spain) Miguel Benítez	6–2 / 3–6 / 6–4	(Spain) Pablo Cardona (Spain) Pincho Fernandez	
4/7/2023	(Spain) Alex Ruiz (Argentina) Juan Tello	6–0 / 6–2	(Spain) Javi Garrido (Spain) Pablo Lijó	
4/7/2023	(Argentina) Federico Chingotto (Spain) Paquito Navarro	6–3 / 6–7 / 6–2	(Spain) Alejandro Arroyo (Spain) Gonzalo Rubio	
4/7/2023	(Argentina) Denis Perino (Argentina) Miguel Lamperti	6–3 / 7–6	(Spain) Ignacio Vilariño (Spain) Salvador Oria	
4/7/2023	(Spain) Javi Rico (Argentina) Leo Augsburger	7–6 / 6–2	(Spain) Jorge Ruiz (Spain) Javier Martínez	
4/7/2023	(Argentina) Franco Stupaczuk (Argentina) Martín Di Nenno	6–1 / 6–2	(Argentina) Agustin Silingo (Brazil) Pablo Lima	

Women's

Date	Winners	Score	Opponent	Refs.
4/7/2023	(Spain) Nuria Rodriguez (Spain) Marta Talaván	6–4 / 4–6 / 5–3 (inj.)	(Spain) Lorena Rufo (Spain) Marina Martínez	
4/7/2023	(Portugal) Ana Catarina Nogueira (Spain) Melania Merino	6–3 / 6–1	(Spain) Eli Amatriaín (Spain) Sofía Saiz	
4/7/2023	(Argentina) Claudia Jensen (Spain) Verónica Virseda	6–4 / 6–4	(Spain) Alejandra Alonso (Spain) Andrea Ustero	
4/7/2023	(Argentina) Aranza Osoro (Spain) Lucía Sainz	6–3 / 6–1	(Italy) Carolina Orsi (Spain) Patty Llaguno	
4/7/2023	(Italy) Emily Stellato (Italy) Giulia Sussarello	7–6 / 6–4	(Spain) Ariadna Cañellas (Spain) Carla Mesa	
4/7/2023	(Spain) Claudia Fernández (Argentina) Julieta Bidahorria	5–7 / 6–1 / 6–1	(Spain) Esther Carnicero (Spain) Mª Carmen Villalba	
4/7/2023	(Spain) Águeda Pérez (Spain) Sara Ruiz	7–6 / 7–6	(Spain) Jimena Velasco (Spain) Noa Canovas	
4/7/2023	(France) Léa Godallier (Spain) Marta Caparros	6–3 / 6–4	(Italy) Chiara Pappacena (Italy) Giorgia Marchetti	
4/7/2023	(Spain) Jessica Castelló (Portugal) Sofia Araújo	6–3 / 6–3	(Spain) Araceli Martinez (Spain) Teresa Navarro	
4/7/2023	(Spain) Majo Sánchez Alayeto (Spain) Mapi Sánchez Alayeto	6–0 / 6–4	(Spain) Carmen Goenaga (Spain) Lucía Martínez	
4/7/2023	(Sweden) Carolina Navarro (Spain) Marina Guinart	6–4 / 6–2	(Spain) Beatriz Caldera (Spain) Marta Barrera	
4/7/2023	(France) Alix Collombon (Spain) Victoria Iglesias	6–7 / 7–6 / 6–2	(Russia) Ksenia Sharifova (Spain) Marta Borrero	

=== Round of 16 ===
Men's

Date	Team A	Score	Team B	Refs.
6/7/2023	(Argentina) Agustín Tapia (Spain) Arturo Coello	6–1 / 6–2	(Spain) Coki Nieto (Argentina) Juan Cruz Belluati	
6/7/2023	(Argentina) Fernando Belasteguín (Spain) Miguel Yanguas	6–3 / 6–3	(Spain) Jairo Bautista (Spain) Juan Martín Díaz	
6/7/2023	(Argentina) Lucho Capra (Argentina) Maxi Sánchez	2–6 / 7–6 / 6–3	(Spain) Francisco Gil (Argentina) Ramiro Moyano	
6/7/2023	(Spain) Alejandro Galán (Spain) Jon Sanz	6–3 / 6–3	(Spain) Eduardo Alonso (Spain) Juanlu Esbri	
6/7/2023	(Spain) Momo González (Argentina) Sanyo Gutiérrez	6–3 / 6–4	(Argentina) Agustín Gutiérrez (Spain) Josete Rico	
6/7/2023	(Spain) Alex Ruiz (Argentina) Juan Tello	6–2 / 6–3	(Spain) Mario del Castillo (Spain) Miguel Benítez	
6/7/2023	(Argentina) Federico Chingotto (Spain) Paquito Navarro	6–1 / 6–3	(Argentina) Denis Perino (Argentina) Miguel Lamperti	
6/7/2023	(Argentina) Franco Stupaczuk (Argentina) Martín Di Nenno	6–3 / 7–6	(Spain) Javi Rico (Argentina) Leo Augsburger	

Women's

Date	Team A	Score	Team B	Refs.
6/7/2023	(Spain) Ariana Sánchez (Spain) Paula Josemaria	7–5 / 6–2	(Spain) Nuria Rodriguez (Spain) Marta Talaván	
6/7/2023	(Argentina) Claudia Jensen (Spain) Verónica Virseda	6–4 / 6–1	(Portugal) Ana Catarina Nogueira (Spain) Melania Merino	
6/7/2023	(Argentina) Aranza Osoro (Spain) Lucía Sainz	6–1 / 6–2	(Italy) Emily Stellato (Italy) Giulia Sussarello	
6/7/2023	(Spain) Claudia Fernández (Argentina) Julieta Bidahorria	6–3 / 7–6	(Spain) Bea González (Argentina) Delfina Brea	
6/7/2023	(Spain) Tamara Icardo (Argentina) Virginia Riera	6–1 / 6–0	(Spain) Águeda Pérez (Spain) Sara Ruiz	
6/7/2023	(France) Léa Godallier (Spain) Marta Caparros	6–7 / 6–3 / 6–1	(Spain) Jessica Castelló (Portugal) Sofia Araújo	
6/7/2023	(Spain) Majo Sánchez Alayeto (Spain) Mapi Sánchez Alayeto	3–6 / 6–3 / 6–4	(Sweden) Carolina Navarro (Spain) Marina Guinart	
6/7/2023	(Spain) Gemma Triay (Spain) Marta Ortega	6–3 / 6–1	(France) Alix Collombon (Spain) Victoria Iglesias	

=== Quarter-Finals ===
Men's

Date	Team A	Score	Team B	Refs.
7/7/2023	(Argentina) Agustín Tapia (Spain) Arturo Coello	6–3 / 6–1	(Argentina) Fernando Belasteguín (Spain) Miguel Yanguas	
7/7/2023	(Spain) Alejandro Galán (Spain) Jon Sanz	6–4 / 6–3	(Argentina) Lucho Capra (Argentina) Maxi Sánchez	
7/7/2023	(Spain) Alex Ruiz (Argentina) Juan Tello	6–4 / 7–6	(Spain) Momo González (Argentina) Sanyo Gutiérrez	
7/7/2023	(Argentina) Franco Stupaczuk (Argentina) Martín Di Nenno	7–5 / 7–6	(Argentina) Federico Chingotto (Spain) Paquito Navarro	

Women's

Date	Team A	Score	Team B	Refs.
7/7/2023	(Spain) Ariana Sánchez (Spain) Paula Josemaría	6–2 / 7–5	(Argentina) Claudia Jensen (Spain) Verónica Virseda	
7/7/2023	(Argentina) Aranza Osoro (Spain) Lucía Sainz	6–2 / 6–1	(Spain) Claudia Fernández (Argentina) Julieta Bidahorria	
7/7/2023	(Spain) Tamara Icardo (Argentina) Virginia Riera	6–3 / 6–1	(France) Léa Godallier (Spain) Marta Caparros	
7/7/2023	(Spain) Gemma Triay (Spain) Marta Ortega	6–3 / 6–1	(Spain) Majo Sánchez Alayeto (Spain) Mapi Sánchez Alayeto	

=== Semi-Finals ===
Men's

Date	Team A	Score	Team B	Refs.
8/7/2023	(Spain) Alejandro Galán (Spain) Jon Sanz	3–6 / 7–6 / 6–4	(Argentina) Agustín Tapia (Spain) Arturo Coello	
8/7/2023	(Argentina) Franco Stupaczuk (Argentina) Martín Di Nenno	7–5 / 6–0	(Spain) Alex Ruiz (Argentina) Juan Tello	

Women's

Date	Team A	Score	Team B	Refs.
8/7/2023	(Spain) Ariana Sánchez (Spain) Paula Josemaría	6–4 / 6–1	(Argentina) Aranza Osoro (Spain) Lucía Sainz	
8/7/2023	(Spain) Gemma Triay (Spain) Marta Ortega	6–1 / 6–4	(Spain) Tamara Icardo (Argentina) Virginia Riera	

=== Finals ===
Men's

Date	Team A	Score	Team B	Refs.
9/7/2023	(Argentina) Franco Stupaczuk (Argentina) Martín Di Nenno	6–3 / 6–3	(Spain) Alejandro Galán (Spain) Jon Sanz	

Women's

Date	Team A	Score	Team B	Refs.
9/7/2023	(Spain) Ariana Sánchez (Spain) Paula Josemaría	6–3 / 6–1	(Spain) Gemma Triay (Spain) Marta Ortega	
