= Ariana Sánchez =

Spanish padel player (born 1997)

Personal information
- Citizenship: Spanish
- Born: Ariana Sánchez Fallada; 19 July 1997 (age 29) Reus, Spain
- Years active: 2016–present
- Height: 1.65 m (5 ft 5 in)

Sport
- Country: Spain
- Sport: Padel
- Position: Revés (Left-side)
- Rank: 5th
- Partner: Andrea Ustero

Achievements and titles
- World finals: 2021, 2022, 2024
- Highest world ranking: 1st (2023, 2024)
- Updated on 23 August 2026

Ariana Sánchez Fallada (born 19 July 1997), known as Ari Sánchez, is a Spanish professional padel player. With Paula Josemaría she was ranked world No. 1 in 2023 and 2024, and the pair won 44 titles in five seasons together, becoming the most successful partnership in women's professional padel. With Spain she won the World Padel Championship in 2021, 2022 and 2024. Since 2026 she has played with Andrea Ustero.

She started her professional career on the World Padel Tour in 2016 and won her first title at the 2017 Santander Open with Marta Ortega. With Alejandra Salazar she won the 2019 Master Final and the 2020 Spanish championship.

== Early life ==
Sánchez was born on 19 July 1997 in Reus, in the province of Tarragona. She first played football and basketball and took up padel through her father, joining him and her brother on court after his Sunday matches; when she moved to Barcelona to pursue the sport she gave up her studies, because she did not have time for everything. She began her professional career in 2016, playing her first season on the drive (right-side) with Tamara Icardo. She later settled on the revés (backhand) side, her usual position since.

== Career ==
=== Partnership with Marta Ortega ===
==== 2016 ====
Ariana began the year competing in five tournaments alongside Tamara Icardo, with her best result being a quarterfinal appearance. However, starting with the La Nucia Open, she teamed up with Marta Ortega, reuniting with the partner she had played with before turning professional.

In the six remaining tournaments, they would all reach the quarterfinals but still fail to make their first semifinal, also missing out on qualifying for the Master Final.

==== 2017 ====
2017 got off to the best possible start, with Ariana and Marta elimintaign the world number ones, Alejandra Salazar & Marta Marrero, in the semifinals, and the former world number ones, Elisabeth Amatriain & Patricia Llaguno, in the final, securing their first trophy in World Padel Tour.

Three more semifinals would follow before they won the Murcia Challenger. In the last seven tournaments of the regular season, they reached another four semifinals but failed to advance to any finals. However, the good results were enough to qualify them for the Master Final for the first time. In the season ending tournament, they reached the final but were defeated by the world number ones, Mapi & Majo Sánchez.

==== 2018 ====
In the first five tournaments of 2018, they reached only two semifinals, but their first success came with winning the Melilla Challenger, followed by reaching the final of the Valencia Master, where they lost to Mapi & Majo once again.

In the next five tournaments, they would reach only two semifinals before making it to the Granada Open final, where they lost to Gemma Triay & Lucía Sainz. They would play two semifinals before competing in their final tournament together at the Master Final, where they were eliminated in the semifinals by their future partners, Alejandra Salazar & Marta Marrero.

=== Partnership with Alejandra Salazar ===
==== 2019 ====
Following the end of the previous season, Alejandra Salazar & Marta Marrero, the pair ranked world number one in 2016, decided to part ways. Marrero teamed up with Marta Ortega, while Salazar invited Ariana to be her partner for 2019.

Together they had a strong start to the season, reaching four out of five possible finals. They faced their former partners in the finals in Marbella, Logroño, and Jaén, winning only the last of these. The other final, which they won, was the Alicante Open. After the women's division did not compete in Buenos Aires, they traded victories with their Marrero & Ortega, winning in Valladolid and losing in Valencia, while also winning the Mijas Open, against Ana Catarina Nogueira & Paula Josemaría.

In the next three tournaments, they reached the finals of the Portugal Master, losing to the "Marta's", and the Menorca Open, where they lost to the twins Mapi & Majo. Failing to reach the finals of the regular season's last two tournaments ended any mathematical chance of finishing the year as world number ones. However, they went on to win the Master Final, in front of more than 9,000 spectators, against Marta Marrero & Marta Ortega who had entered the tournament already crowned as the world number ones.

==== 2020 ====
In the first tournament of the second season with Ariana and Salazar playing together, they managed to reach the final, where they were unable to defeat Marta Marrero & Paula Josemaria. In the first tournament following the COVID break, Salazar and Sánchez defeated Gemma Triay & Lucía Sainz in the Estrella Damm Open final, claiming their first tournament victory of the season.

After two eliminations prior to the final, they went on to win the Valencia Open, avenging their Marbella defeat in the final. However, the momentum began to shift at the subsequent tournament in Sardinia Open (which they did not win). Despite being at the top of the ranking and defeating Gemma & Lucia, who had won in Sardinia, in the Menorca Open final, their failure to reach the finals of the regular season's remaining three tournaments, combined with Saínz & Triay winning all three, allowed their rivals to surpass them and to take the top spot. This left the race for the world number one ranking wide open, and to be decided at the season's final tournament.

In November they won the Spanish championship, beating Eli Amatriain & Patty Llaguno 6–4, 6–4 in the final; it was Sánchez's first national title.

Back in World Padel Tour, at the Master Final, the season's last tournament, they faced Gemma & Lucia in the final in a showdown to determine the world number one ranking. However, they were defeated, finishing the season as the world's second-ranked pair.

=== Partnership with Paula Josemaría ===
==== 2021 ====
With Gemma Triay parting ways with her partner and inviting Alejandra Salazar to form a pair, Ariana teamed up with Paula Josemaría, with whom she would play for five seasons.

They got off to a great start by winning the Madrid Open after defeating Bea González & Lucía Sainz in the finals. However, in the remaining eight tournaments of the first half of the season, they reached four finals, winning the Marbella Master and the Las Rozas Open, but losing in Alicante and Valladolid to Gemma & Salazar, who had already won three tournaments and played in five finals by that point.

They returned strong after the summer break, with Ari and Paula winning the Portugal Master by defeating Marta Marrero & Marta Ortega in the finals. However, in the five next tournaments, they reached only the finals in Sardinia and Córdoba, losing both to Salazar & Triay; who, by winning all five events, secured the world number one ranking for the season. With the top ranking no longer at stake and only two tournaments remaining, Ari and Paula closed the season by winning the Swedish Open and the Master Final.

==== 2022 ====
The start of 2022 was not ideal. Despite reaching four consecutive finals, all against Alejandra & Gemma, they only managed to defeat them in Vigo, losing in Miami, Reus, and Alicante. After two tournaments without reaching the finals, Ari and Paula won the season's first Master in Marbella. They would face the world number ones again in Austria, France, Valladolid, and Málaga. Ari and Paula would win the first and last of the encounters but lost the other two.

Upon returning from the summer break, Ariana and Paula won the Portugal Open, the Swedish Open, and the Madrid Master in succession, and also reached the final of the Amsterdam Open; this run, combined with the inconsistent results of their direct rivals, allowed them to rise to the top of the rankings. However, consecutive losses to Triay & Salazar in Santander, Menorca, Malmö, and Mexico tightened the ranking race, and for the second time in Sánchez's career, everything would come down to the Master Final.

At the season-ending tournament, Ariana & Paula and Gemma & Salazar faced each other in a final for the thirteenth time in 2022. Despite winning the first set, it was Triay & Salazar who triumphed and secured the top spot in the rankings, leaving Ariana in third place (individually) for the third consecutive year.

==== 2023 ====
Just like the previous two years, the start of the 2023 season was difficult. In the season's first four tournaments, Ariana and Paula reached the finals in Abu Dhabi and Paraguay, winning the first but losing the second, while Gemma & Salazar won the other two. However, things changed starting at the fifth tournament, as Ari and Paula avenged those four losses by defeating their rivals in Reus (Challenger), Granada, Brussels, and Vigo. With their victory in Granada, Ariana and Paula reclaimed the world number one spot, rising to the top once again.

Their streak of finals appearances would be interrupted in Denmark, but in the six remaining tournaments before the summer break, they reached another five finals, winning them all by defeating Bea González & Delfina Brea in Austria and France, Tamara Icardo & Virginia Riera in Marbella, and Gemma Triay, and her new partner, Marta Ortega in Valencia and Málaga. Reaching the summer break with ten titles from eleven finals played across fourteen World Padel Tour tournaments.

Between the Valencia and Málaga tournaments, the world number ones competed in the first two women's Premier Padel events, reaching the finals of the Italy Major and the Madrid P1 but losing both.

In the first tournament following the summer break, they were eliminated in the Round of 16, but they quickly bounced back by winning the Paris Major (in Premier Padel), the Madrid Master, and the Germany and Amsterdam Opens. However, in the season's final five tournaments, they reached only the Menorca Open final, where they lost to Gemma Triay & Marta Ortega, though this did not prevent them from finishing the year as world number ones, securing it in October. They ended the season with 14 titles from 18 finals across 26 tournaments played on the WPT and Premier Padel circuits, defining a record in women's padel.

==== 2024 ====
With the unification of the World Padel Tour and Premier Padel into a single circuit, Ariana and Paula began 2024 as the world number one pair, just as they had finished the previous year, a scenario that did not happen on the men's side. Unlike in previous years, they got off to a strong start of the season, securing victories in the finals of the Riyadh P1, over Bea González & Delfina Brea, and over Claudia Fernández & Gemma Triay in the Qatar Major.

In the next five tournaments, they reached only one final, in Seville, but lost to Bea & Delfina, who went on to win four of those five events. However, they returned to winning ways in Mar del Plata, where they avenged their Seville defeat in the final, ending their rivals' title streak. After failing to win the tournaments in Santiago and Bordeaux, Ari and Paula claimed their second Major of the season in Italy.

In the three tournaments leading up to the summer break, they reached every final, starting with a loss in Genoa, but winning in Málaga and Finland, securing their 33rd title as a team and becoming the most successful women's pair in the history of padel.

Their return after the summer break began with a defeat against Claudia & Gemma in the Madrid P1 semifinals. They would face the same pair in the Rotterdam and Valladolid finals, winning the first and losing the second, before wrapping up September with a win in the Paris Major. After skipping the Egypt tournament and suffering elimination at the Dubai P1, Ariana and Paula made history in Kuwait by winning the event. This victory mathematically secured their status as the world's number one pair for the year and tied them with Belasteguín & Lima for the second-highest number of titles of all time (a record they have since dropped to third place behind, having been surpassed by Coello & Tapia).

In the last two tournaments of the regular season, they did not reach any finals. However, they concluded the season by winning the Premier Padel Finals, becoming the first winners of the new circuit's annual year-end tournament. They finished the year with 10 trophies from 13 finals played across 24 tournaments.

==== 2025 ====
In 2025, they kicked off the year by winning the inaugural tournament, the Riyadh P1, but the situation changed over the next seven tournaments. While their main rivals, Delfina Brea & Gemma Triay, reached every final (winning four), Ari and Paula only made it to the finals in Gijón, Miami, Santiago, Qatar, and Brussels, winning only the last one, drawing in Santiago, and losing all the others.

Their third and fourth titles of 2025 came at the Buenos Aires P1 and the Valladolid P2, where they defeated Bea González & Claudia Fernández in both finals; however, in the interim, they lost to Delfina & Gemma again in the Italy Major finals. These results led to a back-and-forth battle for the world number one spot, which combined with failing to reach the finals of the next two tournaments, meant that by the time they arrived at the final event of the season's first half in Tarragona, they were at risk of being overtaken in the rankings. That is precisely what happened, as they suffered another defeat to Delfina & Gemma in the tournament final, thereby losing the number one ranking before the summer break.

They would have a complicated return from the summer break, as they were eliminated before the finals in their first two tournaments by pairs ranked outside the top 3 and lost the finals in Germany and Rotterdam to Delfina and Gemma. However, October and early November saw their best form of the season, with them winning the Milan P1, the Giza P2, and defeated the world number ones in the final of the FIP Pairs World Cup, reigniting the battle for the number one spot.

However, a semifinal exit in Dubai complicated matters, and with an elimination in the Round of 16 at the Mexico Major, Delfina and Gemma mathematically secured the top spot, effectively ending the race. At the Premier Padel Finals, Ariana Sánchez and Paula Josemaría played their final match as a pair, winning the third-place play-off against Andrea Ustero & Sofia Araújo. They parted ways with 44 titles, 74 finals appearances, and two seasons as world number ones, the most successful partnership in women's padel.

=== Partnership with Andrea Ustero ===
==== 2026 ====
In January 2026, Sánchez announced a new partnership with 18-year-old Andrea Ustero; the pair started the season as the third pair in the rankings, behind Delfina Brea &Gemma Triay and behind Bea González & Paula Josemaría. They won their first title together at the Riyadh P1 in February, beating the world No. 1 pair Brea & Triay in three sets in the final.

In the following tournament, they once again reached the final against the same rivals, but this time they were defeated. However, in the next six tournaments, despite reaching four semifinals, they failed to win any of them, having to wait until the Italy Major (the season's ninth tournament) to repeat the matchups from Riyadh and Gijón, where they were defeated in the title match.

They avenged the loss to Italy in the semifinals of the following tournament in Valencia, and by defeating Claudia Fernández & Sofia Araújo in the final, they secured their second title of the season. Of the five tournaments leading up to the summer break, they played only five, due to an injury sustained by Ustero, reaching the final in Valladolid, and exiting in the semifinals in Bordeaux and London.

== Spain national team ==
Sánchez has won the World Padel Championship three times with Spain. In 2021 in Doha she and Josemaría won the decisive second point of the final against Argentina, beating Aranzazu Osoro and Delfina Brea 7–6, 2–6, 6–4 to give Spain their seventh title. In 2022 in Dubai the pair won the opening point of another final against Argentina, again against Osoro and Brea, 7–6, 6–4, as Spain took an eighth title. In 2024, back in Doha, Sánchez and Josemaría saved a match point in the third set of their match against Claudia Jensen and Brea and won the second point as Spain beat Argentina 2–0 for a ninth title.

== Personal life ==
Sánchez has lived in Barcelona since she was 18. In 2024 she said she had worked for nine years with psychologist Óscar Lorenzo, who helped her through the end of 2022, when she lost the No. 1 ranking. She is nicknamed "Magic" for the angled shots she plays.

== Honours ==
=== World Padel Tour (2013–2023) ===
Winner Runner-up

==== Finals ====
N.º	Date	Tournament	Partner	Result	Opponents in the final	Career title No.
2017
1.	2 April 2017	(Spain) Santander Open	(Spain) Marta Ortega	6–4 / 7–6	(Spain) Elisabeth Amatriain (Spain) Patricia Llaguno	1st
2.	2 July 2017	(Spain) Joma Murcia Challenger	(Spain) Marta Ortega	6–2 / 6–4	(Spain) Carolina Navarro (Argentina) Cecilia Reiter	2nd
3.	17 December 2017	(Spain) Master Final	(Spain) Marta Ortega	5–7 / 5–7	(Spain) Mapi Sánchez (Spain) Majo Sánchez	
2018
4.	1 July 2018	(Spain) Melilla Challenger	(Spain) Marta Ortega	6–3 / 6–4	(Spain) Carolina Navarro (Argentina) Cecilia Reiter	3rd
5.	8 July 2018	(Spain) Valencia Master	(Spain) Marta Ortega	3–6 / 4–6	(Spain) Mapi Sánchez (Spain) Majo Sánchez	
6.	14 October 2018	(Spain) Granada Open	(Spain) Marta Ortega	1–6 / 4–6	(Spain) Gemma Triay (Spain) Lucía Sainz	
2019
7.	24 March 2019	(Spain) Marbella Master	(Spain) Alejandra Salazar	6–4 / 1–6 / 4–6	(Spain) Marta Marrero (Spain) Marta Ortega	
8.	14 April 2019	(Spain) Logroño Open	(Spain) Alejandra Salazar	6–4 / 5–7 / 3–6	(Spain) Marta Marrero (Spain) Marta Ortega	
9.	28 April 2019	(Spain) Alicante Open	(Spain) Alejandra Salazar	6–2 / 7–5	(Argentina) Delfina Brea (Spain) Majo Sánchez	4th
10.	26 May 2019	(Spain) Jaén Open	(Spain) Alejandra Salazar	7–5 / 2–6 / 7–5	(Spain) Marta Marrero (Spain) Marta Ortega	5th
11.	23 June 2019	(Spain) Valladolid Master	(Spain) Alejandra Salazar	5–7 / 6–1 / 6–4	(Spain) Marta Marrero (Spain) Marta Ortega	6th
12.	14 July 2019	(Spain) Valencia Open	(Spain) Alejandra Salazar	3–6 / 2–6	(Spain) Marta Marrero (Spain) Marta Ortega	
13.	11 August 2019	(Spain) Mijas Open	(Spain) Alejandra Salazar	6–3 / 6–4	(Portugal) Ana C. Nogueira (Spain) Paula Josemaría	7th
14.	22 September 2019	Portugal Master	(Spain) Alejandra Salazar	5–7 / 3–6	(Spain) Marta Marrero (Spain) Marta Ortega	
15.	13 October 2019	(Spain) Menorca Open	(Spain) Alejandra Salazar	7–5 / 6–7 / 1–6	(Spain) Mapi Sánchez (Spain) Majo Sánchez	
16.	15 December 2019	(Spain) Master Final	(Spain) Alejandra Salazar	7–5 / 3–6 / 7–6	(Spain) Marta Marrero (Spain) Marta Ortega	8th
2020
17.	8 March 2020	(Spain) Marbella Master	(Spain) Alejandra Salazar	6–7 / 6–3 / 2–6	(Spain) Marta Marrero (Spain) Paula Josemaría	
18.	5 July 2020	(Spain) Estrella Damm Open	(Spain) Alejandra Salazar	6–2 / 6–3	(Spain) Gemma Triay (Spain) Lucía Sainz	9th
19.	6 September 2020	(Spain) Valencia Open	(Spain) Alejandra Salazar	7–5 / 7–6	(Spain) Marta Marrero (Spain) Paula Josemaría	10th
20.	27 September 2020	(Spain) Menorca Open	(Spain) Alejandra Salazar	3–6 / 6–1 / 6–2	(Spain) Gemma Triay (Spain) Lucía Sainz	11th
21.	13 December 2020	(Spain) Master Final	(Spain) Alejandra Salazar	4–6 / 3–6	(Spain) Gemma Triay (Spain) Lucía Sainz	
2021
22.	11 April 2021	(Spain) Madrid Open	(Spain) Paula Josemaría	6–3 / 6–4	(Spain) Bea González (Spain) Lucía Sainz	12th
23.	25 April 2021	(Spain) Alicante Open	(Spain) Paula Josemaría	6–0 / 6–1	(Spain) Alejandra Salazar (Spain) Gemma Triay	
24.	13 June 2021	(Spain) Marbella Master	(Spain) Paula Josemaría	6–2 / 6–3	(Spain) Patricia Llaguno (Argentina) Virginia Riera	13th
25.	27 June 2021	(Spain) Valladolid Master	(Spain) Paula Josemaría	3–6 / 3–6	(Spain) Alejandra Salazar (Spain) Gemma Triay	
26.	25 July 2021	(Spain) Las Rozas Open	(Spain) Paula Josemaría	6–2 / 6–1	(Spain) Marta Marrero (Spain) Marta Ortega	14th
27.	5 September 2021	Portugal Master	(Spain) Paula Josemaría	6–3 / 6–4	(Spain) Marta Marrero (Spain) Marta Ortega	15th
28.	11 September 2021	(Italy) Sardegna Open	(Spain) Paula Josemaría	7–6 / 3–6 / 1–6	(Spain) Alejandra Salazar (Spain) Gemma Triay	
29.	24 October 2021	(Spain) Córdoba Open	(Spain) Paula Josemaría	7–6 / 4–6 / 4–6	(Spain) Alejandra Salazar (Spain) Gemma Triay	
30.	14 November 2021	(Sweden) Swedish Open	(Spain) Paula Josemaría	6–2 / 6–3	(Argentina) Delfina Brea (Spain) Tamara Icardo	16th
31.	19 December 2021	(Spain) Master Final	(Spain) Paula Josemaría	6–4 / 6–2	(Spain) Lucía Sainz (Spain) Marta Marrero	17th
2022
32.	27 February 2022	(United States) Miami Open	(Spain) Paula Josemaría	2–6 / 2–6	(Spain) Alejandra Salazar (Spain) Gemma Triay	
33.	13 March 2022	(Spain) Reus Open	(Spain) Paula Josemaría	3–6 / 7–6 / 1–6	(Spain) Alejandra Salazar (Spain) Gemma Triay	
34.	27 March 2022	(Spain) Vigo Open	(Spain) Paula Josemaría	7–5 / 6–3	(Spain) Alejandra Salazar (Spain) Gemma Triay	18th
35.	10 April 2022	(Spain) Alicante Open	(Spain) Paula Josemaría	2–6 / 6–3 / 4–6	(Spain) Alejandra Salazar (Spain) Gemma Triay	
36.	5 June 2022	(Spain) Marbella Master	(Spain) Paula Josemaría	4–6 / 6–3 / 6–3	(Spain) Bárbara Las Heras (Spain) Verónica Virseda	19th
37.	12 June 2022	Austria Open	(Spain) Paula Josemaría	4–6 / 6–4 / 6–3	(Spain) Alejandra Salazar (Spain) Gemma Triay	20th
38.	19 June 2022	(France) French Open	(Spain) Paula Josemaría	6–7 / 4–6	(Spain) Alejandra Salazar (Spain) Gemma Triay	
39.	26 June 2022	(Spain) Valladolid Master	(Spain) Paula Josemaría	3–6 / 6–3 / 0–6	(Spain) Alejandra Salazar (Spain) Gemma Triay	
40.	24 July 2022	(Spain) Málaga Open	(Spain) Paula Josemaría	6–3 / 6–3	(Spain) Alejandra Salazar (Spain) Gemma Triay	21st
41.	11 September 2022	Portugal Open	(Spain) Paula Josemaría	7–5 / 1–0 / WO	(Spain) Bea González (Spain) Marta Ortega	22nd
42.	18 September 2022	(Sweden) Swedish Open	(Spain) Paula Josemaría	6–1 / 6–1	(Spain) Alejandra Salazar (Spain) Gemma Triay	23rd
43.	25 September 2022	(Spain) Madrid Master	(Spain) Paula Josemaría	4–6 / 6–2 / 6–1	(Argentina) Aranzazu Osoro (Spain) Victoria Iglesias	24th
44.	2 October 2022	(Netherlands) Amsterdam Open	(Spain) Paula Josemaría	4–6 / 6–2 / 1–6	(Spain) Bea González (Spain) Marta Ortega	
45.	9 October 2022	(Spain) Santander Open	(Spain) Paula Josemaría	2–6 / 1–6	(Spain) Alejandra Salazar (Spain) Gemma Triay	
46.	23 October 2022	(Spain) Menorca Open	(Spain) Paula Josemaría	1–6 / 5–7	(Spain) Alejandra Salazar (Spain) Gemma Triay	
47.	13 November 2022	(Sweden) Malmö Open	(Spain) Paula Josemaría	4–6 / 5–7	(Spain) Alejandra Salazar (Spain) Gemma Triay	
48.	27 November 2022	Mexico Open	(Spain) Paula Josemaría	3–6 / 6–7	(Spain) Alejandra Salazar (Spain) Gemma Triay	
49.	18 December 2022	(Spain) Master Final	(Spain) Paula Josemaría	6–3 / 4–6 / 4–6	(Spain) Alejandra Salazar (Spain) Gemma Triay	
2023
50.	26 February 2023	(United Arab Emirates) Abu Dhabi Master	(Spain) Paula Josemaría	6–3 / 6–3	(Spain) Alejandra Salazar (Spain) Gemma Triay	25th
51.	26 March 2023	Paraguay Open 1000	(Spain) Paula Josemaría	7–6 / 7–6	(Spain) Alejandra Salazar (Spain) Gemma Triay	
52.	2 April 2023	(Spain) Reus Challenger	(Spain) Paula Josemaría	6–3 / 6–2	(Spain) Alejandra Salazar (Spain) Gemma Triay	26th
53.	16 April 2023	(Spain) Granada Open 1000	(Spain) Paula Josemaría	6–2 / 7–6	(Spain) Alejandra Salazar (Spain) Gemma Triay	27th
54.	30 April 2023	(Belgium) Brussels Open 1000	(Spain) Paula Josemaría	6–7 / 6–3 / 7–5	(Spain) Alejandra Salazar (Spain) Gemma Triay	28th
55.	14 May 2023	(Spain) Vigo Open 1000	(Spain) Paula Josemaría	6–2 / 6–3	(Spain) Alejandra Salazar (Spain) Gemma Triay	29th
56.	28 May 2023	(Austria) Vienna Open 1000	(Spain) Paula Josemaría	6–3 / 6–1	(Spain) Bea González (Argentina) Delfina Brea	30th
57.	4 June 2023	(Spain) Marbella Master	(Spain) Paula Josemaría	6–1 / 6–4	(Spain) Tamara Icardo (Argentina) Virginia Riera	31st
58.	18 June 2023	France Open 1000	(Spain) Paula Josemaría	6–1 / 4–6 / 7–6	(Spain) Bea González (Argentina) Delfina Brea	32nd
59.	9 July 2023	(Spain) Valencia Open 1000	(Spain) Paula Josemaría	6–3 / 6–1	(Spain) Gemma Triay (Spain) Marta Ortega	33rd
60.	30 July 2023	(Spain) Málaga Open 1000	(Spain) Paula Josemaría	6–4 / 6–3	(Spain) Gemma Triay (Spain) Marta Ortega	34th
61.	24 September 2023	(Spain) Madrid Master	(Spain) Paula Josemaría	6–3 / 7–6	(Spain) Gemma Triay (Spain) Marta Ortega	35th
62.	1 October 2023	Germany Open 1000	(Spain) Paula Josemaría	6–3 / 7–6	(Spain) Gemma Triay (Spain) Marta Ortega	36th
63.	15 October 2023	(Netherlands) Amsterdam Open 1000	(Spain) Paula Josemaría	7–6 / 6–0	(Spain) Bea González (Argentina) Delfina Brea	37th
64.	22 October 2023	(Spain) Menorca Open 1000	(Spain) Paula Josemaría	4–6 / 6–4 / 4–6	(Spain) Gemma Triay (Spain) Marta Ortega	

Tournaments won	Challenger	Open	Master	Master Final	Total
Tournaments won	3	24	8	2	37

=== Premier Padel (2024–Present) ===
Winner Runner-up

==== Finals ====
N.º	Date	Tournament	Partner	Result	Opponents in the final	Career title No.
2023
65.	5 March 2023	Italy Major	(Spain) Paula Josemaría	3–6 / 6–3 / 5–7	(Spain) Gemma Triay (Spain) Marta Ortega	
66.	16 July 2023	(Spain) Madrid P1	(Spain) Paula Josemaría	7–5 / 6–7 / 6–7	(Spain) Bea González (Argentina) Delfi Brea	
67.	10 September 2023	(France) Paris Major	(Spain) Paula Josemaría	6–2 / 6–4	(Spain) Gemma Triay (Spain) Marta Ortega	38th
2024
68.	2 March 2024	(Saudi Arabia) Riyadh P1	(Spain) Paula Josemaría	6–3 / 6–2	(Spain) Bea González (Argentina) Delfina Brea	39th
69.	8 March 2024	Qatar Major	(Spain) Paula Josemaría	6–3 / 6–1	(Spain) Claudia Fernández (Spain) Gemma Triay	40th
70.	28 April 2024	(Spain) Seville P2	(Spain) Paula Josemaría	1–6 / 1–6	(Spain) Bea González (Argentina) Delfina Brea	
71.	26 May 2024	(Argentina) Mar del Plata P1	(Spain) Paula Josemaría	6–1 / 5–7 / 6–4	(Spain) Bea González (Argentina) Delfina Brea	41st
72.	23 June 2024	Italy Major	(Spain) Paula Josemaría	6–1 / 6–0	(Spain) Lucía Sainz (Spain) Patty Llaguno	42nd
73.	7 July 2024	(Italy) Genoa P2	(Spain) Paula Josemaría	3–6 / 6–7	(Spain) Marta Ortega (Portugal) Sofia Araujo	
74.	14 July 2024	(Spain) Málaga P1	(Spain) Paula Josemaría	1–6 / 6–4 / 6–2	(Spain) Claudia Fernández (Spain) Gemma Triay	43rd
75.	4 August 2024	Finland P2	(Spain) Paula Josemaría	6–3 / 6–1	(Spain) Marta Ortega (Portugal) Sofia Araujo	44th
76.	15 September 2024	(Netherlands) Rotterdam P1	(Spain) Paula Josemaría	6–4 / 6–4	(Spain) Claudia Fernández (Spain) Gemma Triay	45th
77.	22 September 2024	(Spain) Valladolid P2	(Spain) Paula Josemaría	3–6 / 2–6	(Spain) Claudia Fernández (Spain) Gemma Triay	
78.	6 October 2024	(France) Paris Major	(Spain) Paula Josemaría	6–4 / 6–0	(Spain) Andrea Ustero (Argentina) Delfina Brea	46th
79.	17 November 2024	Kuwait P1	(Spain) Paula Josemaría	7–5 / 7–6	(Spain) Claudia Fernández (Spain) Gemma Triay	47th
80.	22 December 2024	(Spain) Premier Padel Finals	(Spain) Paula Josemaría	6–3 / 6–3	(Spain) Claudia Fernández (Spain) Gemma Triay	48th
2025
81.	15 February 2025	(Saudi Arabia) Riyadh P1	(Spain) Paula Josemaría	W.O.	(Spain) Bea González (Spain) Claudia Fernández	49th
82.	2 March 2025	(Spain) Gijón P2	(Spain) Paula Josemaría	6–0 / 1–6 / 4–6	(Argentina) Delfina Brea (Spain) Gemma Triay	
83.	23 March 2025	(United States) Miami P1	(Spain) Paula Josemaría	6–2 / 1–6 / 4–6	(Argentina) Delfina Brea (Spain) Gemma Triay	
84.	30 March 2025	(Chile) Santiago P1	(Spain) Paula Josemaría	The final had the score of 4–6 / 7–6, but the match was postponed due to rain and ended up being suspended.	(Argentina) Delfina Brea (Spain) Gemma Triay	
85.	19 April 2025	Qatar Major	(Spain) Paula Josemaría	4–6 / 4–6	(Argentina) Delfina Brea (Spain) Gemma Triay	
86.	27 April 2025	(Belgium) Brussels P2	(Spain) Paula Josemaría	6–2 / 6–4	(Argentina) Delfina Brea (Spain) Gemma Triay	50th
87.	1 June 2025	(Argentina) Buenos Aires P1	(Spain) Paula Josemaría	6–2 / 6–2	(Spain) Bea González (Spain) Claudia Fernández	51st
88.	15 June 2025	Italy Major	(Spain) Paula Josemaría	4–6 / 4–6	(Argentina) Delfina Brea (Spain) Gemma Triay	
89.	29 June 2025	(Spain) Valladolid P2	(Spain) Paula Josemaría	6–4 / 7–5	(Spain) Bea González (Spain) Claudia Fernández	52nd
90.	3 August 2025	(Spain) Tarragona P1	(Spain) Paula Josemaría	6–7 / 4–6	(Argentina) Delfina Brea (Spain) Gemma Triay	
91.	28 September 2025	Germany P2	(Spain) Paula Josemaría	4–6 / 6–4 / 3–6	(Argentina) Delfina Brea (Spain) Gemma Triay	
92.	5 October 2025	(Netherlands) Rotterdam P1	(Spain) Paula Josemaría	2–6 / 6–3 / 4–6	(Argentina) Delfina Brea (Spain) Gemma Triay	
93.	12 October 2025	(Italy) Milan P1	(Spain) Paula Josemaría	2–6 / 4–6	(Spain) Bea González (Spain) Claudia Fernández	53rd
94.	1 November 2025	(Egypt) NewGiza P2	(Spain) Paula Josemaría	6–3 / 6–0	(Spain) Alejandra Salazar (Spain) Martina Calvo	54th
95.	9 November 2025	(Kuwait) FIP Pairs World Cup	(Spain) Paula Josemaría	6–3 / 6–3	(Argentina) Delfina Brea (Spain) Gemma Triay	55th
2026
96.	14 February 2025	(Saudi Arabia) Riyadh P1	(Spain) Andrea Ustero	3–6 / 6–1 / 6–4	(Argentina) Delfina Brea (Spain) Gemma Triay	56th
97.	8 March 2025	(Spain) Gijón P2	(Spain) Andrea Ustero	4–6 / 7–6 / 3–6	(Argentina) Delfina Brea (Spain) Gemma Triay	
98.	7 June 2026	Italy Major	(Spain) Andrea Ustero	1–6 / 5–7	(Argentina) Delfina Brea (Spain) Gemma Triay	
99.	14 June 2026	(Spain) Valencia P1	(Spain) Andrea Ustero	6–4 / 3–6 / 6–2	(Spain) Claudia Fernández (Portugal) Sofia Araújo	57th
100.	28 June 2026	(Spain) Valladolid P2	(Spain) Andrea Ustero	4–6 / 2–6	(Spain) Bea González (Spain) Paula Josemaría	
101.	13 September 2026	(France) Paris Major	(Spain) Andrea Ustero	6–2 / 6–0	(Spain) Claudia Fernández (Spain) Martina Calvo	58th
102.	4 October 2026	(Netherlands) Rotterdam P2	(Spain) Andrea Ustero	6–4 / 6–4	(Spain) Bea González (Spain) Paula Josemaría	59th
103.	4 October 2026	Germany P2	(Spain) Andrea Ustero	3–6 / 0–6	(Spain) Claudia Fernández (Spain) Martina Calvo	
104.	18 October 2026	(Italy) Milan P1	(Spain) Andrea Ustero	7–6 / 6–3	(Spain) Bea González (Spain) Paula Josemaría	60th
105.	31 October 2026	Kuwait Major	(Spain) Andrea Ustero	6–3 / 1–6 / 1–6	(Argentina) Delfina Brea (Spain) Gemma Triay	

Tournaments won	P2	P1	Major	PP Finals	FIP World Cup	Total
Tournaments won	5	11	5	1	1	23

=== World Championship ===
- 2021 World Padel Championship
- 2022 World Padel Championship
- 2024 World Padel Championship
- 2026 World Padel Championship
