= 2025 NewGiza P2 =

Padel championships

- Date: 25 October – 1 November
- Edition: 3rd
- Category: P2
- Prize money: €262.250
- Location: Giza, Egypt
- Venue: Newgiza Sports Club

Champions
- Men's doubles: (Spain) Alejandro Galán (Argentina) Federico Chingotto
- Women's doubles: (Spain) Ariana Sánchez (Spain) Paula Josemaría

Chronology

The 2025 NewGiza P2 (officially 2025 Premier Padel NewGiza P2) was the twentieth tournament of the fourth season organized by Premier Padel, the premier padel circuit, promoted by the International Padel Federation, and with the financial backing of Nasser Al-Khelaïfi's Qatar Sports Investments.

In the women's category, for the fifth time this season, a pair ranked outside the top three reached the finals, where they would faced Ariana Sánchez and Paula Josemaría, who were making their fourth consecutive final appearance. In the championship match, the number two seeds defeated Alejandra Salazar and Martina Calvo, claiming their sixth title of the season.

In the men's category, for the fourth time in 2025 a pair ranked outside the top 3 reached the finals, where they faced the number 2 seeds. In the title match, Alejandro Galán and Federico Chingotto defeated Jon Sanz and Paquito Navarro with ease, claiming their seventh title of the season.

== Relevant Data ==
=== Second year without Coello and Tapia ===
For the second consecutive year, Agustín Tapia and Arturo Coello opted to not compete in the Giza P2. The reason for their absence is that only a player's top 22 tournament results count toward the rankings, and since the "Golden Boys" also missed the event last year, they had no points to defend.

Additionally, the FIP Pairs World Cup, a tournament organized FIP and scheduled for the following week (November 3–9) in Kuwait, awards 2,000 points, serving as the season's fifth "Major" of the season.

=== Two of the top 3 women's pairs out ===
Similarly, in the women's division, the number 1 and 3 pairs, Delfi Brea & Gemma Triay and Bea González & Claudia Fernández, also withdrew from the competition due to injuries sustained by Delfina and Bea, respectively.

=== Youngest finalist of all time ===
By reaching the finals at just 17 years, 3 months, and 24 days old, Martina Calvo became the youngest player to reach a professional tournament final, surpassing the record set by Andrea Ustero in 2024.

=== First women's champions across 4 continents ===
By winning the tournament, Ariana Sánchez and Paula Josemaría became the first pair to secure titles across the four continents where Premier Padel tournaments have been held: Europe, the Americas, Asia, and Africa.

=== First men's champions across 4 continents ===
Just like Ari and Paula, by triumphing at the Egypt P2, Alejandro Galán became the first male player to win titles in Europe, the Americas, Asia, and Africa.
He secured three of these titles alongside Federico Chingotto, but the victory in Asia was achieved with his previous partner, Juan Lebrón, when they won the Riyadh P1 last season.

Agustín Tapia and Arturo Coello have also won on every continent where they competed (Europe, the Americas, and Asia), but their absence from the tournaments in Egypt, both last season and this year, prevented them from lifting a trophy on African soil.

== Seeds ==
Male

| Rnk. | Team | FIP Ranking Points |
|---|---|---|
| 1 | (Spain) Alejandro Galán (Argentina) Federico Chingotto | 29140 |
| 2 | (Argentina) Franco Stupaczuk (Spain) Juan Lebrón | 17510 |
| 3 | (Spain) Coki Nieto (Spain) Mike Yanguas | 15410 |
| 4 | (Spain) Jon Sanz (Spain) Paquito Navarro | 10005 |
| 5 | (Argentina) Leandro Augsburguer (Argentina) Martin Di Nenno | 9920 |
| 6 | (Brazil) Lucas Bergamini (Spain) Javi Leal | 8205 |
| 7 | (Spain) Francisco Guerrero (Spain) Momo Gonzalez | 8065 |
| 8 | (Spain) Eduardo Alonso (Argentina) Juan Tello | 6592 |
| 9 | (Spain) Alejandro Ruiz (Spain) Juanlu Esbri | 4797 |
| 10 | (Spain) Alejandro Arroyo (United Arab Emirates) Inigo Jofre | 4657 |
| 11 | (Spain) Javier Garrido (Brazil) Lucas Campagnolo | 4624 |
| 12 | (Argentina) Gonzalo Alfonso (Argentina) Sanyo Gutiérrez | 4145 |
| 13 | (Spain) Jairo Bautista (Argentina) Valentino Libaak | 3889 |
| 14 | (Spain) Jose Garica Diestro (Spain) Victor Ruiz | 3663 |
| 15 | (Spain) Gonzalo Rubio (Spain) Javi Ruiz | 3000 |
| 16 | (Spain) Francisco Cabeza (Spain) Teodoro Zapata | 2536 |

Female

| Rnk. | Team | FIP Ranking Points |
|---|---|---|
| 1 | (Argentina) Delfina Brea (Spain) Gemma Triay | 36100 |
| 2 | (Spain) Ariana Sánchez (Spain) Paula Josemaria | 29480 |
| 3 | (Spain) Bea González (Spain) Claudia Fernandéz | 23990 |
| 4 | (Spain) Andrea Ustero (Portugal) Sofia Araújo | 14135 |
| 5 | (Spain) Marta Ortega (Spain) Tamara Icardo | 13420 |
| 6 | (Spain) Alejandra Alonso (Argentina) Claudia Jensen | 10485 |
| 7 | (Spain) Alejandra Salazar (Spain) Martina Calvo | 8832 |
| 8 | (Spain) Marina Guinart (Spain) Veronica Virseda | 7875 |
| 9 | (Argentina) Aranzazu Osoro (Spain) Victoria Iglesias | 6680 |
| 10 | (Spain) Beatriz Caldera (Spain) Carmen Goenaga | 6157 |
| 11 | (Spain) Jessica Castelló (Spain) Lorena Rufo | 5350 |
| 12 | (Spain) Araceli Martinez (Italy) Carolina Orsi | 4025 |
| 13 | (Argentina) Julieta Bidahorria (Spain) Lara Arruabarrena | 3325 |
| 14 | (Russia) Ksenia Sharifova (Spain) Marina Lobo | 3283 |
| 15 | (Spain) Maria Rodriguez Abajo (Spain) Noa Canovas | 3240 |
| 16 | (France) Alix Collombon (Spain) Jana Montes Cabruja | 3000 |

== Head-to-head record between teams ranked in the top 4 during the season ==
=== Man's ===
| Record | Coello–Tapia | Galán–Chingotto | Lebrón–Stupaczuk | Coki–Yanguas |
| Coello–Tapia | — | 7–3 | 4–1 | 5–0 |
| Galán–Chingotto | 3–7 | — | 5–1 | 6–0 |
| Lebrón–Stupaczuk | 1–4 | 1–5 | — | — |
| Coki–Yanguas | 0–5 | 0–6 | — | — |

=== Women's ===
| Record | D. Brea–Triay | Ariana–Paula | Gonzalez–Fernandez | Araújo–Ustero | Former Pairs | Araújo–Ortega |
| D. Brea–Triay | — | 7–1 | 2–6 | 3–0 | | 3–0 |
| Ariana–Paula | 1–7 | — | 8–1 | 5–0 | | 1–1 |
| Gonzalez–Fernandez | 6–2 | 1–8 | — | — | | — |
| Araújo–Ustero | 0–3 | 0–5 | — | — | | — |
| Former Pairs | | | | | | |
| Araújo–Ortega | 0–3 | 1–1 | — | — | | — |

Because the Santiago final ended in a draw, it is not counted.

== Draws ==
=== Men's Bracket ===
Round of 32
1 | (Argentina) Chingotto / (Spain) Galán | 3 | *
12 | (Argentina) G. Alfonso / (Argentina) Sanyo | 0
Q | (Argentina) A. Gutiérrez / (Chile) J. Valdes | 6 | 7
Q | (Sweden) D. Appelgren / (Sweden) D. Rutgersson | 4 | 6
17 | (Spain) G. Collado / (Spain) P.H. Alvarez | 6 | 3 | 6
25 | (Italy) A. Patiniotis / (Spain) J. Moya | 3 | 6 | 2
23 | (Spain) A.F. Lancha / (Spain) I. Sager | 6 | 7 | 4
5 | (Argentina) Di Nenno / (Argentina) L. Augsburger | 7 | 5 | 6
7 | (Spain) F. Guerrero / (Spain) Momo | 6 | 6
22 | (Spain) D. García / (Spain) J. Martinez | 4 | 3
21 | (Italy) D. Perino / (Argentina) I. Piotto | 6 | 3
14 | (Spain) J.G. Diestro / (Spain) V. Ruiz | 7 | 6
24 | (Spain) F. Gil / (Argentina) M. Lamperti | 6 | 6
WC | (Qatar) M. Nawaf / (Qatar) R. Nawaf | 3 | 1
WC | (Egypt) G. Wakim / (Egypt) Y. Hossam | 1 | 4
3 | (Spain) Coki / (Spain) Yanguas | 6 | 6
4 | (Spain) J. Sanz / (Spain) Paquito | 7 | 6
13 | (Spain) J. Bautista / (Argentina) V. Libaak | 5 | 2
15 | (Spain) G. Rubio / (Spain) J. Ruiz | 3 | 6 | 6
16 | (Spain) F. Cabeza / (Spain) T. Zapata | 6 | 2 | 2
9 | (Spain) A. Ruiz / (Spain) J. Esbri | 7 | 7
10 | (Spain) A. Arroyo / (United Arab Emirates) I. Jofre | 5 | 5
18 | (Spain) A. Goñi / (Argentina) L. Capra | 3 | 5
8 | (Spain) E. Alonso / (Argentina) J. Tello | 6 | 7
6 | (Spain) J. Leal / (Brazil) L. Bergamini | 6 | 4 | 7
20 | (Argentina) E. Torre / (Spain) M. Ortega | 3 | 6 | 6
Q | (Spain) A. Carnero / (Belgium) C. Geens | 6 | 6
Q | (Spain) M. Blanco / (Spain) P. Aliaga | 3 | 4
11 | (Spain) J. Garrido / (Brazil) L. Campagnolo | 6 | 6
26 | (United Arab Emirates) E. Goenaga / (Spain) L.H. Quesada | 2 | 2
19 | (Spain) D. Sánchez / (Spain) P.G. Rodrigo | 1 | 5
2 | (Spain) Lebrón / (Argentina) Stupaczuk | 6 | 7

Round of 16
1 | (Argentina) Chingotto / (Spain) Galán | 6 | 6
Q | (Argentina) A. Gutiérrez / (Chile) J. Valdes | 4 | 4
17 | (Spain) G. Collado / (Spain) P.H. Alvarez | 3 | 6 | 3
5 | (Argentina) Di Nenno / (Argentina) L. Augsburger | 6 | 2 | 6
7 | (Spain) F. Guerrero / (Spain) Momo | 6 | 6
14 | (Spain) J.G. Diestro / (Spain) V. Ruiz | 2 | 4
24 | (Spain) F. Gil / (Argentina) M. Lamperti | 1 | 3
3 | (Spain) Coki / (Spain) Yanguas | 6 | 6
4 | (Spain) J. Sanz / (Spain) Paquito | 6 | 6
15 | (Spain) G. Rubio / (Spain) J. Ruiz | 4 | 3
9 | (Spain) A. Ruiz / (Spain) J. Esbri | 1 | 6 | 6
8 | (Spain) E. Alonso / (Argentina) J. Tello | 6 | 3 | 7
6 | (Spain) J. Leal / (Brazil) L. Bergamini | 6 | 7
Q | (Spain) A. Carnero / (Belgium) C. Geens | 2 | 6
11 | (Spain) J. Garrido / (Brazil) L. Campagnolo | 5 | 7 | 6
2 | (Spain) Lebrón / (Argentina) Stupaczuk | 7 | 6 | 4

Quarter-Final
1 | (Argentina) Chingotto / (Spain) Galán | 7 | 6
5 | (Argentina) Di Nenno / (Argentina) L. Augsburger | 6 | 4
7 | (Spain) F. Guerrero / (Spain) Momo | 0 | 7 | 5
3 | (Spain) Coki / (Spain) Yanguas | 6 | 6 | 7
4 | (Spain) J. Sanz / (Spain) Paquito | 6 | 6
8 | (Spain) E. Alonso / (Argentina) J. Tello | 4 | 3
6 | (Spain) J. Leal / (Brazil) L. Bergamini | 6 | 7
11 | (Spain) J. Garrido / (Brazil) L. Campagnolo | 3 | 6

Semi-Finals
1 | (Argentina) Chingotto / (Spain) Galán | 6 | 6
3 | (Spain) Coki / (Spain) Yanguas | 3 | 3
4 | (Spain) J. Sanz / (Spain) Paquito | 6 | 4 | 7
6 | (Spain) J. Leal / (Brazil) L. Bergamini | 1 | 6 | 5

Finals
1 | (Argentina) Chingotto / (Spain) Galán | 6 | 6
4 | (Spain) J. Sanz / (Spain) Paquito | 1 | 2

=== Women's Bracket ===
Round of 32
9 | (Spain) B. Caldera / (Spain) C. Goenaga
Bye
18 | (Spain) L. Manquillo / (Spain) L. Luján | 2 | 4
16 | (France) A. Collombon / (Spain) J. Cabruja | 6 | 6
LL | (Spain) C. Azcoitia / (Egypt) I. Metwally | 2 | 0
17 | (Spain) M. Talavan / (Spain) S. Saiz | 6 | 6
Bye
6 | (Spain) A. Salazar / (Spain) M. Calvo
5 | (Spain) A. Alonso / (Argentina) C. Jensen
Bye
Q | (Tunisia) D. Chamli / (Spain) T. Navarro | 6 | 6 | 6
LL | (Netherlands) M. Koek / (Germany) V. Kurz | 7 | 3 | 1
WC | (Egypt) L. El Nimr / (Egypt) M. Hakim | 4 | 1
19 | (Italy) G. Marchetti / (France) L. Godallier | 6 | 6
Bye
4 | (Spain) M. Ortega / (Spain) T. Icardo
3 | (Spain) A. Ustero / (Portugal) S. Araújo
Bye
14 | (Russia) K. Sharifova / (Spain) M. Lobo | 6 | 7
Q | (Spain) L. Parra / (Spain) M. Portillo | 3 | 5
11 | (Spain) J. Castelló / (Spain) L. Rufo | 7 | 7
12 | (Spain) A. Martinez / (Italy) C. Orsi | 6 | 5
Bye
8 | (Argentina) A. Osoro / (Spain) V. Iglesias
7 | (Spain) M. Guinart / (Spain) V. Virseda
Bye
13 | (Argentina) J. Bidahorria / (Spain) L. Arruabarrena | 3 | 3
15 | (Spain) M.R. Abajo / (Spain) N. Canovas | 6 | 6
Q | (Italy) E. Terranova / (Italy) F. Ligotti | 2 | 6 | 2
Q | (Italy) C. Millan / (Spain) C. Romero | 6 | 3 | 6
Bye
2 | (Spain) A. Sánchez / (Spain) P. Josemaria

Round of 16
9 | (Spain) B. Caldera / (Spain) C. Goenaga | 6 | 4 | 6
16 | (France) A. Collombon / (Spain) J. Cabruja | 2 | 6 | 1
17 | (Spain) M. Talavan / (Spain) S. Saiz | 6 | 2
6 | (Spain) A. Salazar / (Spain) M. Calvo | 7 | 6
5 | (Spain) A. Alonso / (Argentina) C. Jensen | 6 | 6
Q | (Tunisia) D. Chamli / (Spain) T. Navarro | 2 | 0
19 | (Italy) G. Marchetti / (France) L. Godallier | 2 | 4
4 | (Spain) M. Ortega / (Spain) T. Icardo | 6 | 6
4 | (Spain) A. Ustero / (Portugal) S. Araújo | 6 | 6
14 | (Russia) K. Sharifova / (Spain) M. Lobo | 2 | 2
11 | (Spain) J. Castelló / (Spain) L. Rufo | 6 | 6 | 6
8 | (Argentina) A. Osoro / (Spain) V. Iglesias | 7 | 3 | 7
7 | (Spain) M. Guinart / (Spain) V. Virseda | 7 | 7
15 | (Spain) M.R. Abajo / (Spain) N. Canovas | 5 | 6
Q | (Italy) C. Millan / (Spain) C. Romero | 1 | 0
2 | (Spain) A. Sánchez / (Spain) P. Josemaria | 6 | 6

Quarter-Final
9 | (Spain) B. Caldera / (Spain) C. Goenaga | 0 | 3
6 | (Spain) A. Salazar / (Spain) M. Calvo | 6 | 6
5 | (Spain) A. Alonso / (Argentina) C. Jensen | 3 | 6 | 1
4 | (Spain) M. Ortega / (Spain) T. Icardo | 6 | 3 | 6
4 | (Spain) A. Ustero / (Portugal) S. Araújo | 6 | 6
8 | (Argentina) A. Osoro / (Spain) V. Iglesias | 2 | 3
7 | (Spain) M. Guinart / (Spain) V. Virseda | 4 | 1
2 | (Spain) A. Sánchez / (Spain) P. Josemaria | 6 | 6

Semi-Finals
6 | (Spain) A. Salazar / (Spain) M. Calvo | 6 | 6
4 | (Spain) M. Ortega / (Spain) T. Icardo | 4 | 2
4 | (Spain) A. Ustero / (Portugal) S. Araújo | 2 | 6 | 4
2 | (Spain) A. Sánchez / (Spain) P. Josemaria | 6 | 4 | 6

Finals
6 | (Spain) A. Salazar / (Spain) M. Calvo | 3 | 0
2 | (Spain) A. Sánchez / (Spain) P. Josemaria | 6 | 6

== Results ==
=== Round of 32 ===
Men's

| Date | Winners | Score | Opponent | Refs. |
|---|---|---|---|---|
| 28/10/2025 | (Spain) Alejandro Galán (Argentina) Federico Chingotto | 3–0 / W.O. | (Argentina) Gonzalo Alfonso (Argentina) Sanyo Gutiérrez | |
| 28/10/2025 | (Argentina) Agustín Gutiérez (Chile) Javier Valdes | 6–4 / 7–6 | (Sweden) Daniel Appelgren (Sweden) Douglas Rutgersson | |
| 28/10/2025 | (Spain) Guillermo Collado (Spain) Pol Hernandez | 6–3 / 3–6 / 6–2 | (Italy) Aris Patiniotis (Spain) Jesus Moya | |
| 27/10/2025 | (Argentina) Leandro Augsburger (Argentina) Martin Di Nenno | 7–6 / 5–7 / 6–4 | (Spain) Andres Fernandez Lancha (Spain) Ignacio Sager | |
| 28/10/2025 | (Spain) Francisco Guerrero (Spain) Momo Gonzalez | 6–4 / 6–3 | (Spain) Diego García (Spain) Jose Luis Gonzalez | |
| 28/10/2025 | (Spain) Jose García Diestro (Spain) Victor Ruiz | 7–6 / 6–3 | (Italy) Denis Perino (Argentina) Ignacio Piotto | |
| 27/10/2025 | (Spain) Francisco Gil Morales (Argentina) Miguel Lamperti | 6–3 / 6–1 | (Qatar) Mashari Nawaf (Qatar) Rashed Nawaf | |
| 28/10/2025 | (Spain) Coki Nieto (Spain) Mike Yanguas | 6–1 / 6–4 | (Egypt) Georges Wakim (Egypt) Youssef Hossam | |
| 28/10/2025 | (Spain) Jon Sanz (Spain) Paquito Navarro | 7–5 / 6–2 | (Spain) Jairo Bautista (Argentina) Valentino Libaak | |
| 27/10/2025 | (Spain) Gonzalo Rubio (Spain) Javi Ruiz | 3–6 / 6–2 / 6–2 | (Spain) Francisco Cabeza (Spain) Teodoro Zapata | |
| 28/10/2025 | (Spain) Aléx Ruiz (Spain) Juanlu Esbri | 7–5 / 7–5 | (Spain) Alex Arroyo (United Arab Emirates) Iñigo Jofre | |
| 28/10/2025 | (Spain) Eduardo Alonso (Argentina) Juan Tello | 6–3 / 7–5 | (Spain) Aimar Goñi (Argentina) Lucho Capra | |
| 28/10/2025 | (Spain) Javi Leal (Brazil) Lucas Bergamini | 6–3 / 4–6 / 7–6 | (Argentina) Eduardo Agustin Torre (Spain) Mario Ortega | |
| 28/10/2025 | (Spain) Alejandro Jerez (Belgium) Clement Geens | 6–3 / 6–4 | (Spain) Marcos Gonzalez (Spain) Pepe Aliaga | |
| 27/10/2025 | (Spain) Javi Garrido (Brazil) Lucas Campagnolo | 6–2 / 6–2 | (Spain) Enrique Goenaga (Spain) Luis Hernandez Quesada | |
| 28/10/2025 | (Argentina) Franco Stupaczuk (Spain) Juan Lebrón | 6–1 / 7–5 | (Spain) David Gala Sánchez (Spain) Pablo García Rodrigo | |

Women's

| Date | Winners | Score | Opponent | Refs. |
|---|---|---|---|---|
| 28/10/2025 | (France) Alix Collombon (Spain) Jana Montes Cabruja | 6–2 / 6–4 | (Spain) Laura Lujan Rodriguez (Spain) Letizia Manquillo | |
| 28/10/2025 | (Spain) Marta Talavan (Spain) Sofía Saiz Vallejo | 6–2 / 6–0 | (Spain) Carmen Azcoitia (Egypt) Iman Metwally | |
| 28/10/2025 | (Tunisia) Dora Chamli (Spain) Teresa Navarro | 6–7 / 6–3 / 6–1 | (Netherlands) Marcella Koek (Germany) Victoria Kurz | |
| 28/10/2025 | (Italy) Giorgia Marchetti (France) Lea Godallier | 6–4 / 6–1 | (Egypt) Laila El Nimr (Egypt) Moura Hakim | |
| 28/10/2025 | (Russia) Ksenia Sharifova (Spain) Marina Martinez Lobo | 6–3 / 7–5 | (Spain) Lucía Perez Parra (Spain) María Portillo Perez | |
| 28/10/2025 | (Spain) Jessica Castelló (Spain) Lorena Rufo | 7–6 / 7–5 | (Spain) Araceli Martinez (Italy) Carolina Orsi | |
| 28/10/2025 | (Spain) Laia Rodriguez Abajo (Spain) Noa Canovas | 6–3 / 6–3 | (Argentina) Julieta Bidahorria (Spain) Lara Arruabarrena | |
| 28/10/2025 | (Spain) Candela Lucendo Millan (Spain) Claudia Ordoñez | 6–2 / 3–6 / 6–2 | (Italy) Elsa Terranova (Italy) Francesca Ligotti | |

=== Round of 16 ===
Men's

| Date | Winners | Score | Opponent | Refs. |
|---|---|---|---|---|
| 29/10/2025 | (Spain) Alejandro Galán (Argentina) Federico Chingotto | 6–4 / 6–4 | (Argentina) Agustín Gutiérez (Chile) Javier Valdes | |
| 29/10/2025 | (Argentina) Leandro Augsburger (Argentina) Martin Di Nenno | 6–3 / 2–6 / 6–3 | (Spain) Guillermo Collado (Spain) Pol Hernandez | |
| 29/10/2025 | (Spain) Francisco Guerrero (Spain) Momo Gonzalez | 6–2 / 6–4 | (Spain) Jose García Diestro (Spain) Victor Ruiz | |
| 29/10/2025 | (Spain) Coki Nieto (Spain) Mike Yanguas | 6–1 / 6–3 | (Spain) Francisco Gil Morales (Argentina) Miguel Lamperti | |
| 29/10/2025 | (Spain) Jon Sanz (Spain) Paquito Navarro | 6–4 / 6–3 | (Spain) Gonzalo Rubio (Spain) Javi Ruiz | |
| 29/10/2025 | (Spain) Eduardo Alonso (Argentina) Juan Tello | 6–1 / 3–6 / 7–6 | (Spain) Aléx Ruiz (Spain) Juanlu Esbri | |
| 29/10/2025 | (Spain) Javi Leal (Brazil) Lucas Bergamini | 6–2 / 7–6 | (Spain) Alejandro Jerez (Belgium) Clement Geens | |
| 29/10/2025 | (Spain) Javi Garrido (Brazil) Lucas Campagnolo | 5–7 / 7–6 / 6–4 | (Argentina) Franco Stupaczuk (Spain) Juan Lebrón | |

Women's

| Date | Winners | Score | Opponent | Refs. |
|---|---|---|---|---|
| 29/10/2025 | (Spain) Beatriz Caldera (Spain) Carmen Goenaga | 6–2 / 4–6 / 6–1 | (France) Alix Collombon (Spain) Jana Montes Cabruja | |
| 29/10/2025 | (Spain) Alejandra Salazar (Spain) Martina Calvo | 7–6 / 6–2 | (Spain) Marta Talavan (Spain) Sofía Saiz Vallejo | |
| 29/10/2025 | (Spain) Alejandra Alonso (Argentina) Claudia Jensen | 6–2 / 6–0 | (Tunisia) Dora Chamli (Spain) Teresa Navarro | |
| 29/10/2025 | (Spain) Marta Ortega (Spain) Tamara Icardo | 6–2 / 6–4 | (Italy) Giorgia Marchetti (France) Lea Godallier | |
| 29/10/2025 | (Spain) Andrea Ustero (Portugal) Sofia Araújo | 6–2 / 6–2 | (Russia) Ksenia Sharifova (Spain) Marina Martinez Lobo | |
| 29/10/2025 | (Argentina) Aranzazu Osoro (Spain) Victoria Iglesias | 7–6 / 3–6 / 7–6 | (Spain) Jessica Castelló (Spain) Lorena Rufo | |
| 29/10/2025 | (Spain) Marina Guinart (Spain) Verónica Virseda | 7–5 / 7–6 | (Spain) Laia Rodriguez Abajo (Spain) Noa Canovas | |
| 29/10/2025 | (Spain) Ariana Sánchez (Spain) Paula Josemaría | 6–1 / 6–0 | (Spain) Candela Lucendo Millan (Spain) Claudia Ordoñez | |

=== Quarter-Finals ===
Men's

| Date | Winners | Score | Opponent | Refs. |
|---|---|---|---|---|
| 30/10/2025 | (Spain) Alejandro Galán (Argentina) Federico Chingotto | 7–6 / 6–4 | (Argentina) Leandro Augsburger (Argentina) Martin Di Nenno | |
| 30/10/2025 | (Spain) Coki Nieto (Spain) Mike Yanguas | 6–0 / 6–7 / 7–5 | (Spain) Francisco Guerrero (Spain) Momo Gonzalez | |
| 30/10/2025 | (Spain) Jon Sanz (Spain) Paquito Navarro | 6–4 / 6–3 | (Spain) Eduardo Alonso (Argentina) Juan Tello | |
| 30/10/2025 | (Spain) Javi Leal (Brazil) Lucas Bergamini | 6–3 / 7–6 | (Spain) Javi Garrido (Brazil) Lucas Campagnolo | |

Women's

| Date | Winners | Score | Opponent | Refs. |
|---|---|---|---|---|
| 30/10/2025 | (Spain) Alejandra Salazar (Spain) Martina Calvo | 6–0 / 6–3 | (Spain) Beatriz Caldera (Spain) Carmen Goenaga | |
| 30/10/2025 | (Spain) Marta Ortega (Spain) Tamara Icardo | 6–3 / 3–6 / 6–1 | (Spain) Alejandra Alonso (Argentina) Claudia Jensen | |
| 30/10/2025 | (Spain) Andrea Ustero (Portugal) Sofia Araújo | 6–2 / 6–3 | (Argentina) Aranzazu Osoro (Spain) Victoria Iglesias | |
| 30/10/2025 | (Spain) Ariana Sánchez (Spain) Paula Josemaría | 6–4 / 6–1 | (Spain) Marina Guinart (Spain) Verónica Virseda | |

=== Semi-Finals ===
Men's

| Date | Winners | Score | Opponent | Refs. |
|---|---|---|---|---|
| 31/10/2025 | (Spain) Alejandro Galán (Argentina) Federico Chingotto | 6–3 / 6–3 | (Spain) Coki Nieto (Spain) Mike Yanguas | |
| 31/10/2025 | (Spain) Jon Sanz (Spain) Paquito Navarro | 6–1 / 4–6 / 7–5 | (Spain) Javi Leal (Brazil) Lucas Bergamini | |

Women's

| Date | Winners | Score | Opponent | Refs. |
|---|---|---|---|---|
| 31/10/2025 | (Spain) Alejandra Salazar (Spain) Martina Calvo | 6–4 / 6–2 | (Spain) Marta Ortega (Spain) Tamara Icardo | |
| 31/10/2025 | (Spain) Ariana Sánchez (Spain) Paula Josemaría | 6–2 / 4–6 / 6–4 | (Spain) Andrea Ustero (Portugal) Sofia Araújo | |

=== Finals ===
Men's

| Date | Winners | Score | Opponent | Refs. |
|---|---|---|---|---|
| 1/11/2025 | (Spain) Alejandro Galán (Argentina) Federico Chingotto | 6–1 / 6–2 | (Spain) Jon Sanz (Spain) Paquito Navarro | |

Women's

| Date | Winners | Score | Opponent | Refs. |
|---|---|---|---|---|
| 1/11/2025 | (Spain) Ariana Sánchez (Spain) Paula Josemaría | 6–3 / 6–0 | (Spain) Alejandra Salazar (Spain) Martina Calvo | |
