= 2023 Paraguay Open =

Padel championships

- Date: 21 March – 26 March
- Category: Open 1000
- Location: Asunción, Paraguay
- Venue: SND Arena

Champions
- Men's doubles: (Argentina) Agustín Tapia (Spain) Arturo Coello
- Women's doubles: (Spain) Alejandra Salazar (Spain) Gemma Triay

Chronology

The 2023 WPT Paraguay Open (officially 2023 WPT Paraguay Padel Open 1000) was the fourth tournament of the eleventh edition of World Padel Tour. The final phase was played between March 21 and 26, 2023 at the facilities of SND Arena in Asunción, while the preliminary phase was played between March 3 and 5 at the "Euroindoor" of Madrid, Spain.

In the women's category, Alejandra Salazar and Gemma Triay secured their third title of the year against their competitors for number 1, Ariana Sánchez and Paula Josemaría, in a very close match that ended up being decided by the tie-breaks of the first two sets; 7–6 and 7–6.

In the men's category, Agustín Tapia and Arturo Coello maintained their winning streak this year (4 tournaments out of 4), defeating the "Superpibes", Franco Stupaczuk and Martín Di Nenno, in a match where they imposed a high pace of play that the Argentinians could not follow; 6–2 and 6–1.

== Relevant data ==
=== First time in Paraguay ===
Like the previous tournament in Chile, this tournament marked the first time the World Padel Tour had held a tournament in Paraguay. Wildcards were awarded to Arianna Stagni and Verónica Cepede in the women's draw and to Fernando Lavall and Nahuel Fernández in the men's.

=== Controversy withdrawals ===
In the third and final tournament of the WPT's American tour, there were, once again, numerous withdrawals and injuries after the main draw had already been released, forcing the WPT to make changes just days before the start. A total of 10 pairs did not compete in the tournament for various reasons. Of these 10 open spots in the main draw, 5 were awarded by lottery to pairs who had lost in the qualifying rounds ("lucky losers"), and the remaining 5 were filled by the top 5 seeds, who advanced directly to the round of 16.

== Registered teams ==
Male

Rnk.	Team	WPT Ranking Points
1	(Spain) Alejandro Galán (Spain) Juan Lebrón	33.670
2	(Argentina) Agustín Tapia (Spain) Arturo Coello	23.100
3	(Argentina) Franco Stupaczuk (Argentina) Martín Di Nenno	16.685
4	(Spain) Alex Ruiz (Spain) Momo González	11.265
5	(Argentina) Federico Chingotto (Spain) Javi Garrido	9.170
6	(Argentina) Agustín Gutiérrez (Argentina) Lucho Capra	6.526
7	(Spain) Gonzalo Rubio (Spain) Javier Ruiz	5.414
8	(Spain) Alejandro Arroyo (Spain) Miguel Yanguas	4.936
9	(Spain) José García Diestro (Spain) Pincho Fernández	4.314
10	(Argentina) Juan Cruz Belluati (Argentina) Miguel Lamperti	3.917
11	(Spain) Josete Rico (Spain) Salvador Oria	3.487
12	(Argentina) Agustín Gomez Silingo (Argentina) Juan Martín Díaz	3.051
13	(Spain) Eduardo Alonso (Spain) Juanlu Esbri	3.038
14	(Spain) Marc Quílez (Spain) Toni Bueno	2.624
15	(Spain) Javier García Mora (Spain) Javier González Barahona	2.583
16	(Spain) Ignacio Vilariño (Spain) Jaime Muñoz	2.351
17	(Spain) Antón Sans (Spain) Teodoro Zapata	2.212
(W.C.)	(Paraguay) Fernando Lavall (Paraguay) Nahuel Fernández	0
(L.L.)	(Italy) Facundo Domínguez (Chile) Javier Valdés	1.028
(L.L.)	(Argentina) Leo Augsburger (Argentina) Tino Libaak	504
(L.L.)	(Spain) Daniel Bressel (Spain) Pablo Castillo	412
(L.L.)	(Spain) Álvaro López (Argentina) Exequiel Mouriño	296
(L.L.)	(Argentina) Teo Gamondi (Argentina) Valentín San Juan	40
Qualified from the preliminary rounds
A	(Spain) Javier Martínez (Spain) Rafael Méndez	1.913
B	(Spain) Jaime Menéndez (Sweden) Simon Vasquez	646
C	(Spain) Iñigo Jofre (Spain) Luis Hernandez Quesada	616
D	(Spain) Enrique Goenaga (Spain) Jairo Bautista	1.157

Female

Rnk.	Team	WPT Ranking Points
1	(Spain) Ariana Sánchez (Spain) Paula Josemaría	35.190
2	(Spain) Alejandra Salazar (Spain) Gemma Triay	33.460
3	(Spain) Bea González (Spain) Marta Ortega	16.606
4	(Spain) Patty Llaguno (Spain) Victoria Iglesias	10.828
5	(Argentina) Aranza Osoro (Spain) Lucía Sainz	10.625
6	(Spain) Bárbara Las Heras (Spain) Verónica Virseda	10.440
7	(Argentina) Virginia Riera (Spain) Tamara Icardo	10.155
8	(Spain) Majo Sánchez Alayeto (Spain) Mapi Sánchez Alayeto	9.095
9	(Argentina) Delfina Brea (Portugal) Sofia Araújo	6.611
10	(Argentina) Claudia Jensen (Spain) Jessica Castelló	6.490
11	(France) Alix Collombon (Spain) Carla Mesa	5.042
12	(Spain) Lorena Rufo (Spain) Marta Talaván	4.573
13	(Spain) Esther Carnicero (Spain) Lucía Martínez	3.716
14	(Sweden) Carolina Navarro (Spain) Mª Carmen Villalba	3.671
15	(Spain) Beatriz Caldera (Spain) Carmen Goenaga	3.573
16	(Spain) Marina Guinart (Spain) Nuria Rodríguez	3.054
17	(Spain) Claudia Fernández (Argentina) Julieta Bidahorria	3.048
18	(Portugal) Ana Catarina Nogueira (Spain) Eli Amatriaín	3.020
19	(Spain) Araceli Martínez (Spain) Noa Cánovas	2.735
20	(Spain) Marta Barrera (Spain) Marta Caparrós	2.724
21	(Italy) Carolina Orsi (France) Léa Godallier	2.483
22	(Spain) Alejandra Alonso (Spain) Melania Merino	2.409
23	(Spain) Anna Cortiles (Spain) Sofía Saiz	2.399
(W.C.)	(Paraguay) Arianna Stagni (Paraguay) Verónica Cepede	0
Qualified from the preliminary rounds
A	(Spain) Marina Martínez (Spain) Teresa Navarro	2.395
B	(Spain) Jimena Velasco (Spain) Sara Pujals	1.843
C	(Russia) Ksenia Sharifova (Spain) Patrícia Martínez	2.000
D	(Italy) Emily Stellato (Italy) Giulia Sussarello	1.972

== Schedule ==
The matches begin on Saturday at the "Euroindoor Alcorcón" club with the preliminary rounds.:

- Friday, 3rd: Men's qualifying rounds 1 and 2.
- Saturday, 4th: Men's qualifying round 3 and women's qualifying rounds 1 and 2.
- Sunday, 5th: Final round of men's and women's qualifying.

The main draw was played two weeks later:

- Tuesday, 21st: Round of 32.
- Wednesday, 22nd: Round of 32.
- Thursday, 23rd: Round of 16.
- Friday, 24th: Quarterfinals.
- Saturday, 25th: Semifinals.
- Sunday, 26th: Finals.

== Results ==
=== Men's Bracket ===
Round of 32
1	(Spain) Galán / (Spain) Lebrón
Bye
(Italy) Domínguez / (Chile) Valdés (L.L.)	5	2
(Argentina) Silingo / (Spain) J.M. Díaz	7	6
(Argentina) Mouriño / (Spain) López (L.L.)	1	3
(Spain) Goenaga / (Spain) Bautista (D)	6	6
Bye
5	(Argentina) Chingotto / (Spain) Garrido
7	(Spain) G. Rubio / (Spain) Javi R.	6	6
(Paraguay) Lavall / (Paraguay) Nahuel Fdez.(W.C.)	1	2
(Argentina) Augsburger/ (Argentina) Libaak (L.L.)	7	7
(Spain) Castillo / (Spain) Bressel (L.L.)	5	6
(Spain) Jofre / (Spain) Hernández (C)	0	4
(Argentina) Belluati / (Argentina) Lamperti	6	6
Bye
3	(Argentina) Stupa / (Argentina) Di Nenno
4	(Spain) Álex / (Spain) Momo
Bye
(Spain) E. Alonso / (Spain) J. Esbri	6	6
(Sweden) Vasquez / (Spain) Menéndez (B)	3	2
(Spain) J.G. Mora / (Spain) J.G. Barahona	6	6
(Spain) A. Sans / (Spain) T. Zapata	3	4
(Spain) Méndez / (Spain) Martínez (A)	6	3	2
8	(Spain) Arroyo / (Spain) Yanguas	4	6	6
6	(Argentina) A. Gutiérrez / (Argentina) Lucho	7	6
(Spain) Quílez / (Spain) Bueno	6	3
(Spain) J.G. Diestro / (Spain) Pincho	6	6
(Argentina) Gamondi/ (Argentina) San Juan (L.L.)	0	1
(Spain) J. Muñoz / (Spain) I. Vilariño	7	0
(Spain) Josete Rico / (Spain) S. Oria	6	0
Bye
2	(Argentina) Tapia / (Spain) Coello

Round of 16
1	(Spain) Galán / (Spain) Lebrón	6	6
(Argentina) Silingo / (Spain) J.M. Díaz	4	2
(Spain) Goenaga / (Spain) Bautista (D)	2	5
5	(Argentina) Chingotto / (Spain) Garrido	6	7
7	(Spain) G. Rubio / (Spain) Javi R.	6	3	4
(Argentina) Augsburger/ (Argentina) Libaak (L.L.)	3	6	6
(Argentina) Belluati / (Argentina) Lamperti	4	6	4
3	(Argentina) Stupa / (Argentina) Di Nenno	6	4	6
4	(Spain) Álex / (Spain) Momo	6	6
(Spain) J. Esbri / (Spain) E. Alonso	3	2
(Spain) J.G. Mora / (Spain) J.G. Barahona	6	6	4
8	(Spain) Arroyo / (Spain) Yanguas	4	7	6
6	(Argentina) A. Gutiérrez / (Argentina) Lucho	4	3
(Spain) Pincho / (Spain) J.G. Diestro	6	6
(Spain) J. Muñoz / (Spain) I. Vilariño	4	2
2	(Argentina) Tapia / (Spain) Coello	6	6

Quarter-Final
1	(Spain) Galán / (Spain) Lebrón	3	0
5	(Argentina) Chingotto / (Spain) Garrido	6	4
(Argentina) Augsburger/ (Argentina) Libaak (L.L.)	3	2
3	(Argentina) Stupa / (Argentina) Di Nenno	6	6
4	(Spain) Álex / (Spain) Momo	7	6
8	(Spain) Arroyo / (Spain) Yanguas	6	2
(Spain) Pincho / (Spain) J.G. Diestro	6	3
2	(Argentina) Tapia / (Spain) Coello	7	6

Semi-Finals
5	(Argentina) Chingotto / (Spain) Garrido	5	6
3	(Argentina) Stupa / (Argentina) Di Nenno	7	7
4	(Spain) Álex / (Spain) Momo	4	2
2	(Argentina) Tapia / (Spain) Coello'	6	6

Finals
3	(Argentina) Stupa / (Argentina) Di Nenno	2	1
2	(Argentina) Tapia / (Spain) Coello	6	6

=== Women's Bracket ===
Round of 32
1	(Spain) Ariana / (Spain) Paula
Bye
(Italy) Sussarello / (Italy) Stellato (D) (W.O.)
(Spain) Carnicero / (Spain) Lucía M.
(France) Collombon / (Spain) Mesa	6	3	6
(Italy) C. Orsi / (France) Godallier	0	6	7
(Spain) Marina M. / (Spain) Teresa N. (A)	5	1
5	(Argentina) Aranza / (Spain) Sainz	7	6
8	(Spain) Majo / (Spain) Mapi	6	3	6
(Argentina) Delfi / (Portugal) S. Araújo	4	6	7
(Spain) M. Barrera / (Spain) M. Caparrós	2	2
(Spain) Castelló / (Argentina) Jensen	6	6
(Spain) Martínez / (Russia) Ksenia (C)	6	2
(Spain) Guinart / (Spain) Rodríguez	7	6
Bye
4	(Spain) Patty / (Spain) Victoria
3	(Spain) Bea / (Spain) Martita
Bye
(Spain) Caldera / (Spain) Goenaga	2	5
(Argentina) Bidahorria / (Spain) Claudia F.	6	7
(Spain) Pujals / (Spain) Velasco (B)	4	3
(Spain) Talaván / (Spain) L. Rufo	6	6
(Spain) Araceli / (Spain) Cánovas	2	3
6	(Spain) Bárbara / (Spain) Virseda	6	6
7	(Spain) Tamara / (Argentina) Virginia R.	6	6
(Portugal) A. Nogueira / (Spain) Amatriaín	2	1
(Spain) A. Alonso / (Spain) M. Merino	6	6
(Paraguay) Cepede / (Paraguay) Stagni (W.C.)	2	1
(Spain) A. Cortiles / (Spain) S. Saiz	6	1	7
(Sweden) C. Navarro / (Spain) Villalba	3	6	6
Bye
2	(Spain) Triay / (Spain) Salazar

Round of 16
1	(Spain) Ariana / (Spain) Paula	6	6
(Spain) Carnicero / (Spain) Lucía M.	4	2
(Italy) C. Orsi / (France) Godallier	3	2
5	(Argentina) Aranza / (Spain) Sainz	6	6
(Argentina) Delfi / (Portugal) S. Araújo	6	6
(Spain) Castelló / (Argentina) Jensen	4	0
(Spain) Guinart / (Spain) Rodríguez	6	7
4	(Spain) Patty / (Spain) Victoria	4	5
3	(Spain) Bea / (Spain) Martita	6	6
(Argentina) Bidahorria / (Spain) Claudia F.	4	4
(Spain) Talaván / (Spain) L. Rufo	6	6	6
6	(Spain) Bárbara / (Spain) Virseda	7	4	4
7	(Spain) Tamara / (Argentina) Virginia R.	6	6
(Spain) A. Alonso / (Spain) M. Merino	2	1
(Spain) S. Saiz / (Spain) A. Cortiles	1	3
2	(Spain) Salazar / (Spain) Triay	6	6

Quarter-Final
1	(Spain) Ariana / (Spain) Paula	7	6
5	(Argentina) Aranza / (Spain) Sainz	6	3
(Argentina) Delfi / (Portugal) S. Araújo	6	6
(Spain) Guinart / (Spain) Rodríguez	1	2
3	(Spain) Bea / (Spain) Martita	6	4	6
(Spain) Talaván / (Spain) L. Rufo	4	6	4
7	(Spain) Tamara / (Argentina) Virginia R.	4	5
2	(Spain) Salazar / (Spain) Triay	6	7

Semi-Finals
1	(Spain) Ariana / (Spain) Paula	6	6
(Argentina) Delfi / (Portugal) S. Araújo	3	2
3	(Spain) Bea / (Spain) Martita	2	0
2	(Spain) Salazar / (Spain) Triay	6	6

Finals
1	(Spain) Ariana / (Spain) Paula	6	6
2	(Spain) Salazar / (Spain) Triay	7	7

=== Final qualifying round ===
Men's

Data	Qualified	WPT Ranking Point	Opponents	Result
A	(Spain) Javier Martínez (Spain) Rafael Méndez	1.913 vs 731	(Spain) Adrián Ronco (Spain) José Mª Mouliaa	6–0 / 6–2
B	(Spain) Jaime Menéndez (Sweden) Simon Vasquez	646 vs 811	(Spain) Ignacio Piotto (Spain) Pedro Vera	6–4 / 3–6 / 6–2
C	(Spain) Iñigo Jofre (Spain) Luis Hernandez Quesada	616 vs 1.149	(Spain) Cristóbal García (Spain) Miguel Ángel Solbes	6–3 / 6–4
Letra D	(Spain) Enrique Goenaga (Spain) Jairo Bautista	1.157 vs 1.833	(Spain) Álvaro Cepero (Spain) Arnau Ayats	6–4 / 3–6 / 7–6

Women's

Data	Qualified	WPT Ranking Point	Opponents	Result
A	(Spain) Marina Martínez (Spain) Teresa Navarro	2.395 vs 1.756	(Spain) Águeda Pérez (Spain) Sara Ruiz	6–3 / 1–6 / 6–1
Letra B	(Spain) Jimena Velasco (Spain) Sara Pujals	1.843 vs 2.007	(Spain) Lorena Alonso (Spain) Sandra Hernández	6–3 / 7–6
C	(Russia) Ksenia Sharifova (Spain) Patrícia Martínez	2.000 vs 1.255	(Spain) Mª Eulalia Rodríguez (Spain) Carlotta Casali	6–4 / 5–7 / 7–6
D	(Italy) Emily Stellato (Italy) Giulia Sussarello	1.972 vs 2.260	(Spain) Arantxa Soriano (Spain) Alicia Blanco	7–5 / 6–0

=== Round of 32 ===
Men's

Date	Team A	Score	Team B	Refs.
21/3/2023	(Spain) Javier García Mora (Spain) Javier González Barahona	6–3 / 6–4	(Spain) Antón Sans (Spain) Teodoro Zapata	
21/3/2023	(Spain) Eduardo Alonso (Spain) Juanlu Esbri	6–3 / 6–2	(Spain) Jaime Menéndez (Sweden) Simon Vasquez	
21/3/2023	(Spain) Jaime Muñoz (Spain) Ignacio Vilariño	7–6 / 0–0 (*inj-)	(Spain) Josete Rico (Spain) Salvador Oria*	
21/3/2023	(Argentina) Exequiel Mouriño (Spain) Álvaro López	1–6 / 3–6	(Spain) Enrique Goenaga (Spain) Jairo Bautista	
21/3/2023	(Argentina) Leo Augsburger (Argentina) Valentino Libaak	7–5 / 7–6	(Spain) Daniel Bressel (Spain) Pablo Castillo	
22/3/2023	(Spain) José García Diestro (Spain) Pincho Fernández	6–0 / 6–1	(Argentina) Teo Gamondi (Argentina) Valentín San Juan	
22/3/2023	(Italy) Facundo Domínguez (Chile) Javier Valdés	5–7 / 2–6	(Argentina) Agustín Gomez Silingo (Argentina) Juan Martín Díaz	
22/3/2023	(Argentina) Agustín Gutiérrez (Argentina) Lucho Capra	7–6 / 6–3	(Spain) Marc Quílez (Spain) Toni Bueno	
22/3/2023	(Spain) Iñigo Jofre (Spain) Luis Hdez. Quesada	0–6 / 4–6	(Argentina) Miguel Lamperti (Argentina) Juan Cruz Belluati	
22/3/2023	(Spain) Rafael Méndez (Spain) Javier Martínez	6–4 / 3–6 / 2–6	(Spain) Alejandro Arroyo (Spain) Miguel Yanguas	
22/3/2023	(Spain) Javier Ruiz (Spain) Gonzalo Rubio	6–1 / 6–2	(Paraguay) Fernando Lavall (Paraguay) Nahuel Fernández	

Women's

Date	Team A	Score	Team B	Refs.
21/3/2023	(Spain) Beatriz Caldera (Spain) Carmen Goenaga	2–6 / 5–7	(Spain) Claudia Fernández (Argentina) Julieta Bidahorria	
21/3/2023	(Italy) Emily Stellato (Italy) Giulia Sussarello	W.O.	(Spain) Esther Carnicero (Spain) Lucía Martínez	
21/3/2023	(Russia) Ksenia Sharifova (Spain) Patrícia Martínez	6–7 / 2–6	(Spain) Marina Guinart (Spain) Nuria Rodríguez	
21/3/2023	(Spain) Jimena Velasco (Spain) Sara Pujals	4–6 / 3–6	(Spain) Lorena Rufo (Spain) Marta Talaván	
21/3/2023	(Spain) Anna Cortiles (Spain) Sofía Saiz	6–3 / 1–6 / 7–6	(Sweden) Carolina Navarro (Spain) Mª Carmen Villalba	
21/3/2023	(Spain) Tamara Icardo (Argentina) Virginia Riera	6–2 / 6–1	(Portugal) Ana Catarina Nogueira (Spain) Eli Amatriaín	
22/3/2023	(Spain) Majo Sánchez Alayeto (Spain) Mapi Sánchez Alayeto	6–4 / 3–6 / 6–7	(Argentina) Delfina Brea (Portugal) Sofia Araújo	
22/3/2023	(Spain) Araceli Martínez (Spain) Noa Cánovas	2–6 / 3–6	(Spain) Bárbara Las Heras (Spain) Verónica Virseda	
22/3/2023	(France) Alix Collombon (Spain) Carla Mesa	6–0 / 3–6 / 6–7	(Italy) Carolina Orsi (France) Léa Godallier	
22/3/2023	(Spain) Marta Barrera (Spain) Marta Caparrós	2–6 / 2–6	(Argentina) Claudia Jensen (Spain) Jessica Castelló	
22/3/2023	(Spain) Alejandra Alonso (Spain) Melania Merino	6–2 / 6–1	(Paraguay) Arianna Stagni (Paraguay) Verónica Cepede	
22/3/2023	(Spain) Marina Martínez (Spain) Teresa Navarro	5–7 / 1–6	(Argentina) Aranza Osoro (Spain) Lucía Sainz	

=== Round of 16 ===
Men's

Date	Team A	Score	Team B	Refs.
23/3/2023	(Spain) Alex Ruiz (Spain) Momo González	6–3 / 6–2	(Spain) Eduardo Alonso (Spain) Juanlu Esbri	
23/3/2023	(Spain) Ignacio Vilariño (Spain) Jaime Muñoz	4–6 / 2–6	(Argentina) Agustín Tapia (Spain) Arturo Coello	
23/3/2023	(Argentina) Agustín Gutiérrez (Argentina) Lucho Capra	4–6 / 3–6	(Spain) José García Diestro (Spain) Pincho Fernández	
23/3/2023	(Spain) Javier García Mora (Spain) Javier González Barahona	6–4 / 6–7 / 4–6	(Spain) Alejandro Arroyo (Spain) Miguel Yanguas	
23/3/2023	(Spain) Alejandro Galán (Spain) Juan Lebrón	6–4 / 6–2	(Argentina) Agustín Gomez Silingo (Argentina) Juan Martín Díaz	
23/3/2023	(Spain) Gonzalo Rubio (Spain) Javier Ruiz	6–3 / 3–6 / 4–6	(Argentina) Leo Augsburger (Argentina) Valentino Libaak	
23/3/2023	(Spain) Enrique Goenaga (Spain) Jairo Bautista	2–6 / 5–7	(Argentina) Federico Chingotto (Spain) Javi Garrido	
23/3/2023	(Argentina) Juan Cruz Belluati (Argentina) Miguel Lamperti	4–6 / 6–4 / 4–6	(Argentina) Franco Stupaczuk (Argentina) Martín Di Nenno	

Women's

Date	Team A	Score	Team B	Refs.
23/3/2023	(Spain) Bea González (Spain) Marta Ortega	6–4 / 6–4	(Spain) Claudia Fernández (Argentina) Julieta Bidahorria	
23/3/2023	(Spain) Marina Guinart (Spain) Nuria Rodríguez	6–4 / 7–5	(Spain) Patty Llaguno (Spain) Victoria Iglesias	
23/3/2023	(Spain) Lorena Rufo (Spain) Marta Talaván	6–7 / 6–4 / 6–4	(Spain) Bárbara Las Heras (Spain) Verónica Virseda	
23/3/2023	(Spain) Anna Cortiles (Spain) Sofía Saiz	1–6 / 3–6	(Spain) Alejandra Salazar (Spain) Gemma Triay	
23/3/2023	(Italy) Carolina Orsi (France) Léa Godallier	3–6 / 2–6	(Argentina) Aranza Osoro (Spain) Lucía Sainz	
23/3/2023	(Argentina) Delfina Brea (Portugal) Sofia Araújo	6–4 / 6–0	(Argentina) Claudia Jensen (Spain) Jessica Castelló	
23/3/2023	(Spain) Ariana Sánchez (Spain) Paula Josemaría	6–4 / 6–2	(Spain) Esther Carnicero (Spain) Lucía Martínez	
23/3/2023	(Spain) Tamara Icardo (Argentina) Virginia Riera	6–2 / 6–1	(Spain) Alejandra Alonso (Spain) Melania Merino	

=== Quarter-Finals ===
Men's

Date	Team A	Score	Team B	Refs.
24/3/2023	(Spain) Alex Ruiz (Spain) Momo González	7–6 / 6–2	(Spain) Alejandro Arroyo (Spain) Miguel Yanguas	
24/3/2023	(Spain) José García Diestro (Spain) Pincho Fernández	6–7 / 3–6	(Argentina) Agustín Tapia (Spain) Arturo Coello	
24/3/2023	(Spain) Alejandro Galán (Spain) Juan Lebrón*	3–6 / 0–4 (*inj.)	(Argentina) Federico Chingotto (Spain) Javi Garrido	
24/3/2023	(Argentina) Leo Augsburger (Argentina) Tino Libaak	3–6 / 2–6	(Argentina) Franco Stupaczuk (Argentina) Martín Di Nenno	

Women's

Date	Team A	Score	Team B	Refs.
24/3/2023	(Argentina) Virginia Riera (Spain) Tamara Icardo	4–6 / 5–7	(Spain) Alejandra Salazar (Spain) Gemma Triay	
24/3/2023	(Spain) Bea González (Spain) Marta Ortega	6–4 / 4–6 / 6–4	(Spain) Lorena Rufo (Spain) Marta Talaván	
24/3/2023	(Spain) Ariana Sánchez (Spain) Paula Josemaría	7–6 / 6–3	(Argentina) Aranza Osoro (Spain) Lucía Sainz	
24/3/2023	(Argentina) Delfina Brea (Portugal) Sofia Araújo	6–1 / 6–2	(Spain) Marina Guinart (Spain) Nuria Rodríguez	

=== Semi-Finals ===
Men's

Date	Team A	Score	Team B	Refs.
25/3/2023	(Spain) Alex Ruiz (Spain) Momo González	4–6 / 2–6	(Argentina) Agustín Tapia (Spain) Arturo Coello	
25/3/2023	(Argentina) Federico Chingotto (Spain) Javi Garrido	5–7 / 6–7	(Argentina) Franco Stupaczuk (Argentina) Martín Di Nenno	

Women's

Date	Team A	Score	Team B	Refs.
25/3/2023	(Spain) Bea González (Spain) Marta Ortega	2–6 / 0–6	(Spain) Alejandra Salazar (Spain) Gemma Triay	
25/3/2023	(Spain) Ariana Sánchez (Spain) Paula Josemaría	6–3 / 6–2	(Argentina) Delfina Brea (Portugal) Sofia Araújo	

=== Finals ===
Men's

Date	Team A	Score	Team B	Refs.
26/3/2023	(Argentina) Franco Stupaczuk (Argentina) Martín Di Nenno	2–6 / 1–6	(Argentina) Agustín Tapia (Spain) Arturo Coello	

Women's

Date	Team A	Score	Team B	Refs.
26/3/2023	(Spain) Ariana Sánchez (Spain) Paula Josemaría	6–7 / 6–7	(Spain) Alejandra Salazar (Spain) Gemma Triay	
