= 2023 Mexico Open =

Padel championships

- Date: 20 – 26 November
- Edition: 4th
- Category: Open
- Location: Mexico City, Mexico
- Venue: Gimnasio Olímpico Juan de la Barrera

Champions
- Men's doubles: (Argentina) Agustín Tapia (Spain) Arturo Coello
- Women's doubles: (Spain) Bea González (Argentina) Delfi Brea

Chronology
Previous
Malmö Open
Next
Milan P1 (PP)

The WPT 2023 Mexico Open (officially WPT 2023 Skechers Mexico Padel Open) was the twenty first tournament of the eleventh edition of World Padel Tour. The tournament was played between 20th November and 26th November of 2023 at Gimnasio Olímpico Juan de la Barrera in Mexico City, Mexico.

In the women's category, the third and fifth ranked pairs met in the finals, with the number three team Bea González and Delfina Brea defeating Tamara Icardo and Virginia Riera to win their fifth title of the season.

In the men's category, the first ranked team Agustín Tapia and Arturo Coello won the tournament after defeating surprising finalists Leo Augsburger and Valentino Libaak, winning their 15th title in 26 tournaments (11 in WPT and 4 in PP). With the tournament win, Coello and Tapia mathematically assured that they would finish the year in first place in the ranking.

== Schedule ==
The final draw was played:

- Thursday 22 November: Round of 32.
- Thursday 23 November: Round of 16.
- Friday 24 November: Quarterfinals.
- Saturday 25 November: Semifinals.
- Sunday 26 November: Finals.

== Results ==
=== Men's Bracket ===
Round of 32
1	(Spain) Coello / (Argentina) Tapia
Bye
(Spain) J.G. Mora / (Spain) J.G. Barahona	6	6	7
(Spain) I. Vilariño / (Spain) S. Oria	3	7	5
(Spain) N. Zurita / (Spain) P. Neria	5	2
(Spain) J.M. Díaz / (Argentina) M. Lamperti	7	6
(Spain) F. Guerrero / (Spain) T. Zapata	4	6	7
7	(Argentina) A. Gutiérrez / (Argentina) Sanyo	6	1	6
5	(Spain) J. Garrido / (Spain) Momo	7	7
(Spain) M. Quilez / (Spain) T. Bueno	5	6
(Spain) J. Rico / (Spain) M. Benitez	6	6
(Mexico) J. Montoya / (Mexico) P. Gutierrez	3	4
(Spain) A. Arroyo / (Spain) E. Alonso	6	6
(Argentina) A. Chozas / (Argentina) L. Capra	2	2
(Spain) J. Ponce / (Spain) J. Montalbán	0	3
4	(Spain) A. Ruiz / (Argentina) J. Tello	6	6
3	(Argentina) Chingotto / (Spain) Paquito	6	6
(Spain) D.G. Batista / (Spain) I. Sager	4	2
(Spain) F. Gil / (Argentina) R. Moyano	1	1
(Argentina) L. Augsburger / (Argentina) V. Libaak	6	6
(Spain) A. Ayats / (Argentina) J.C. Belluati	6	6
(Mexico) E. Angelino / (Mexico) E. Melgar	2	3
(Brazil) L. Bergamini / (Spain) V. Ruiz	6	3	7
8	(Spain) G. Rubio / (Spain) P. Fernandez	2	6	6
6	(Spain) Coki / (Spain) J. Sanz	1	*
(Spain) J. Leal / (Spain) J.G. Diestro	1
(Spain) I. Jofre / (Spain) P.G. Rodrigo	4	7	6
(Spain) J. Ruiz / (Spain) P. Cardona	6	5	7
(Spain) J. Bautista / (Spain) J. Muñoz	4	6	6
(Argentina) A. Silingo / (Spain) A. Cepero	6	3	2
Bye
2	(Argentina) F. Stupaczuk / (Argentina) Di Nenno

Round of 16
1	(Spain) Coello / (Argentina) Tapia	6	6
(Spain) J.G. Mora / (Spain) J.G. Barahona	2	3
(Spain) J.M. Díaz / (Argentina) M. Lamperti	3	4
(Spain) F. Guerrero / (Spain) T. Zapata	6	6
5	(Spain) J. Garrido / (Spain) Momo	6	6
(Spain) J. Rico / (Spain) Miguel Benitez	4	0
(Spain) A. Arroyo / (Spain) E. Alonso	6	2	7
4	(Spain) A. Ruiz / (Argentina) J. Tello	4	6	6
3	(Argentina) Chingotto / (Spain) Paquito	6	4	6
(Argentina) L. Augsburger / (Argentina) V. Libaak	1	6	7
(Spain) A. Ayats / (Argentina) J.C. Belluati	2	7	4
(Brazil) L. Bergamini / (Spain) V. Ruiz	6	6	6
6	(Spain) Coki / (Spain) J. Sanz	3	3
(Spain) J. Ruiz / (Spain) P. Cardona	6	6
(Spain) J. Bautista / (Spain) J. Muñoz	3	6
2	(Argentina) F. Stupaczuk / (Argentina) Di Nenno	6	7

Quarter-Final
1	(Spain) Coello / (Argentina) Tapia	6	6
(Spain) F. Guerrero / (Spain) T. Zapata	2	4
(Spain) J. Garrido / (Spain) Momo	4	6
(Spain) A. Arroyo / (Spain) E. Alonso	6	7
(Argentina) L. Augsburger / (Argentina) V. Libaak	6	7	6
(Brazil) L. Bergamini / (Spain) V. Ruiz	7	5	3
(Spain) J. Ruiz / (Spain) P. Cardona	4	1
2	(Argentina) F. Stupaczuk / (Argentina) Di Nenno]	6	6

Semi-Finals
1	(Spain) Coello / (Argentina) Tapia	6	6
(Spain) A. Arroyo / (Spain) E. Alonso	2	4
(Argentina) L. Augsburger / (Argentina) V. Libaak	3	6	7
2	(Argentina) F. Stupaczuk / (Argentina) Di Nenno	6	1	6

Finals
1	(Spain) Coello / (Argentina) Tapia	6	6
(Argentina) L. Augsburger / (Argentina) V. Libaak	4	2

=== Women's Bracket ===
Round of 32
1	(Spain) G. Triay / (Spain) M. Ortega
Bye
(Mexico) A. Fernandez / (Mexico) M. Diaz	0	2
(Spain) C. Fernandez / (Spain) V. Iglesias	6	6
(Spain) A. Cañellas / (Spain) N. Aguilar	6	1	4
(Spain) A. Martinez / (Spain) S. Ruiz	2	6	6
(Spain) J. Velasco / (Spain) N. Canovas	7	6
7	(Spain) Majo / (Spain) Mapi	6	4
8	(Spain) L. Sainz / (Spain) P. Llaguno	6	6
(Spain) M. Barrera / (Spain) M. Merino	2	4
(Portugal) A. Nogueira / (Spain) B. Caldera	6	6
(Russia) K. Sharifova / (Spain) M. Borrero	2	3
(Spain) C. Goenaga / (Spain) L. Martínez	6	6
(Spain) J. Bautista / (Brazil) R. Piltcher	2	3
Bye
4	(Spain) T. Icardo / (Argentina) V. Riera
3	(Spain) A. Salazar / (Portugal) S. Araújo
Bye
(Spain) A. Perez / (Spain) P. Martínez	6	7
(Spain) L. Manquillo / (Italy) L. Vano	3	5
(Spain) L.R. Abajo / (Spain) S. Bellver	5	1
(Italy) C. Orsi / (Spain) C. Mesa	7	6
(Spain) M. Caparros / (Spain) T. Navarro	2	2
6	(Argentina) C. Jensen / (Spain) V. Virseda	6	6
5	(Argentina) A. Osoro / (Spain) J. Castelló
Bye
(Mexico) A. Cabrejas Ruiz / (Mexico) C. Coellar	0	2
(Spain) N. Rodriguez / (Spain) M. Talaván	6	6
(Sweden) C. Navarro / (Spain) M. Guinart	7	6	6
(France) A. Collombon / (Spain) L. Rufo	6	7	4
Bye
2	(Spain) B. González / (Argentina) D. Brea

Round of 16
1	(Spain) G. Triay / (Spain) M. Ortega	5	6	4
(Spain) C. Fernandez / (Spain) V. Iglesias	7	1	6
(Spain) A. Martinez / (Spain) S. Ruiz	7	6	6
(Spain) J. Velasco / (Spain) N. Canovas	6	7	7
8	(Spain) L. Sainz / (Spain) P. Llaguno	4	2
(Portugal) A. Nogueira / (Spain) B. Caldera	6	6
(Spain) C. Goenaga / (Spain) L. Martínez	2	2
4	(Spain) T. Icardo / (Argentina) V. Riera	6	6
3	(Spain) A. Salazar / (Portugal) S. Araújo	6	6
(Spain) A. Perez / (Spain) P. Martínez	2	2
(Italy) C. Orsi / (Spain) C. Mesa	6	2	1
6	(Argentina) C. Jensen / (Spain) V. Virseda	4	6	6
5	(Argentina) A. Osoro / (Spain) J. Castelló	6	6
(Spain) N. Rodriguez / (Spain) M. Talaván	3	4
(Sweden) C. Navarro / (Spain) M. Guinart	1	3
2	(Spain) B. González / (Argentina) D. Brea	6	6

Quarter-Final
(Spain) C. Fernandez / (Spain) V. Iglesias	4	4
(Spain) J. Velasco / (Spain) N. Canovas	6	6
(Portugal) A. Nogueira / (Spain) B. Caldera	6	5
4	(Spain) T. Icardo / (Argentina) V. Riera	7	7
3	(Spain) A. Salazar / (Portugal) S. Araújo	6	4	4
6	(Argentina) C. Jensen / (Spain) V. Virseda	1	6	6
5	(Argentina) A. Osoro / (Spain) J. Castelló	3	7	2
2	(Spain) B. González / (Argentina) D. Brea	6	6	6

Semi-Finals
(Spain) J. Velasco / (Spain) N. Canovas	4	4
4	(Spain) T. Icardo / (Argentina) V. Riera	6	6
6	(Argentina) C. Jensen / (Spain) V. Virseda	2	4
2	(Spain) B. González / (Argentina) D. Brea	6	6

Finals
4	(Spain) T. Icardo / (Argentina) V. Riera	4	2
2	(Spain) B. González / (Argentina) D. Brea	6	6

=== Round of 32 ===
Men's

Date	Winners	Score	Opponent	Refs.
22/11/2023	(Spain) Javier García Mora (Spain) Javier Gonzalez Barahona	6–3 / 6–7 / 7–5	(Spain) Ignacio Vilariño (Spain) Salvador Oria	
22/11/2023	(Spain) Juan Martín Díaz (Argentina) Miguel Lamperti	7–5 / 6–2	(Spain) Nicolás Zurita (Spain) Pablo Gonzalez Neria	
22/11/2023	(Spain) Francisco Guerrero (Spain) Teodoro Zapata	4–6 / 6–1 / 7–6	(Argentina) Agustín Gutiérrez (Argentina) Sanyo Gutiérrez	
22/11/2023	(Spain) Javi Garrido (Spain) Momo González	7–5 / 7–6	(Spain) Marc Quilez (Spain) Toni Bueno	
22/11/2023	(Spain) Jose Rico (Spain) Miguel Benitez	6–3 / 6–4	(Mexico) José Angel Montoya (Mexico) Pablo Padilla Gutierrez	
22/11/2023	(Spain) Alejandro Arroyo (Spain) Eduardo Alonso	6–2 / 6–2	(Argentina) Alex Chozas (Argentina) Lucho Capra	
22/11/2023	(Spain) Alex Ruiz (Argentina) Juan Tello	6–0 / 6–3	(Spain) Jorge Angles Ponce (Spain) José Pedro Montalbán	
22/11/2023	(Argentina) Federico Chingotto (Spain) Paquito Navarro	6–4 / 6–2	(Spain) Diego Gil Batista (Spain) Ignacio Sager Nagel	
22/11/2023	(Argentina) Leo Augsburger (Argentina) Valentino Libaak	6–1 / 6–1	(Spain) Francisco Gil (Argentina) Ramiro Moyano	
22/11/2023	(Spain) Arnau Ayats (Argentina) Juan Cruz Belluati	6–2 / 6–3	(Mexico) Edgar Espinosa Angelino (Mexico) Emilio Canela Melgar	
22/11/2023	(Brazil) Lucas Bergamini (Spain) Víctor Ruiz	6–2 / 3–6 / 7–6	(Spain) Gonzalo Rubio (Spain) Pincho Fernandez	
22/11/2023	(Spain) Coki Nieto (Spain) Jon Sanz	1–1 / W.O.	(Spain) Javier Leal (Spain) José García Diestro	
22/11/2023	(Spain) Javier Ruiz (Spain) Pablo Cardona	6–4 / 5–7 / 7–6	(Spain) Iñigo Jofre (Spain) Pablo Garcia Rodrigo	
22/11/2023	(Spain) Jairo Bautista (Spain) Jaime Muñoz	4–6 / 6–3 / 6–2	(Argentina) Agustin Gomez Silingo (Spain) Alvaro Cepero	

Women's

Date	Winners	Score	Opponent	Refs.
22/11/2023	(Spain) Claudia Fernandez (Spain) Victoria Iglesias	6–0 / 6–2	(Mexico) Ana Belen Fernandez (Mexico) Michelle Rullan Diaz	
22/11/2023	(Spain) Araceli Martinez (Spain) Sara Ruiz Soto	2–6 / 6–1 / 6–4	(Spain) Ariadna Cañellas (Spain) Noemi Aguilar	
22/11/2023	(Spain) Jimena Velasco (Spain) Noa Canovas	7–6 / 6–4	(Spain) Majo Sánchez Alayeto (Spain) Mapi Sánchez Alayeto	
22/11/2023	(Spain) Lucía Sainz (Spain) Patty Llaguno	6–2 / 6–4	(Spain) Marta Barrera (Spain) Melania Merino	
22/11/2023	(Portugal) Ana Catarina Nogueira (Spain) Beatriz Caldera	6–2 / 6–3	(Russia) Ksenia Sharifova (Spain) Marta Borrero	
22/11/2023	(Spain) Carmen Goenaga (Spain) Lucía Martínez	6–2 / 6–3	(Spain) Julia Polo Bautista (Brazil) Raquel Piltcher	
22/11/2023	(Spain) Agueda Perez (Spain) Patricia Martínez	6–3 / 7–5	(Spain) Letizia Manquillo (Italy) Lorena Vano	
22/11/2023	(Italy) Carolina Orsi (Spain) Carla Mesa	7–5 / 6–1	(Spain) Laia Rodriguez Abajo (Spain) Sandra Bellver	
22/11/2023	(Argentina) Claudia Jensen (Spain) Verónica Virseda	6–2 / 6–2	(Spain) Marta Caparros (Spain) Teresa Navarro	
22/11/2023	(Spain) Nuria Rodriguez (Spain) Marta Talaván	6–0 / 6–2	(Mexico) Ana Maria Cabrejas Ruiz (Mexico) Camila Ramme Coellar	
22/11/2023	(Sweden) Carolina Navarro (Spain) Marina Guinart	7–6 / 6–7 / 6–4	(France) Alix Collombon (Spain) Lorena Rufo	

=== Round of 16 ===
Men's

Date	Winners	Score	Opponent	Refs.
23/11/2023	(Argentina) Agustín Tapia (Spain) Arturo Coello	6–2 / 6–3	(Spain) Javier García Mora (Spain) Javier Gonzalez Barahona	
23/11/2023	(Spain) Francisco Guerrero (Spain) Teodoro Zapata	6–3 / 6–4	(Spain) Juan Martín Díaz (Argentina) Miguel Lamperti	
23/11/2023	(Spain) Javi Garrido (Spain) Momo González	6–4 / 6–0	(Spain) Jose Rico (Spain) Miguel Benitez	
23/11/2023	(Spain) Alejandro Arroyo (Spain) Eduardo Alonso	6–4 / 2–6 / 7–6	(Spain) Alex Ruiz (Argentina) Juan Tello	
23/11/2023	(Argentina) Leo Augsburger (Argentina) Valentino Libaak	1–6 / 6–4 / 7–6	(Argentina) Federico Chingotto (Spain) Paquito Navarro	
23/11/2023	(Brazil) Lucas Bergamini (Spain) Víctor Ruiz	6–2 / 6–7 / 6–4	(Spain) Arnau Ayats (Argentina) Juan Cruz Belluati	
23/11/2023	(Spain) Javier Ruiz (Spain) Pablo Cardona	6–3 / 6–3	(Spain) Coki Nieto (Spain) Jon Sanz	
23/11/2023	(Argentina) Franco Stupaczuk (Argentina) Martin Di Nenno	6–3 / 7–6	(Spain) Jairo Bautista (Spain) Jaime Muñoz	

Women's

Date	Winners	Score	Opponent	Refs.
23/11/2023	(Spain) Claudia Fernandez (Spain) Victoria Iglesias	7–5 / 1–6 / 6–4	(Spain) Gemma Triay (Spain) Marta Ortega	
23/11/2023	(Spain) Jimena Velasco (Spain) Noa Canovas	6–7 / 7–6 / 7–6	(Spain) Araceli Martinez (Spain) Sara Ruiz Soto	
23/11/2023	(Portugal) Ana Catarina Nogueira (Spain) Beatriz Caldera	6–4 / 6–2	(Spain) Lucía Sainz (Spain) Patty Llaguno	
23/11/2023	(Spain) Tamara Icardo (Argentina) Virginia Riera	6–2 / 6–2	(Spain) Carmen Goenaga (Spain) Lucía Martínez	
23/11/2023	(Spain) Alejandra Salazar (Portugal) Sofia Araújo	6–2 / 6–2	(Spain) Agueda Perez (Spain) Patricia Martínez	
23/11/2023	(Argentina) Claudia Jensen (Spain) Verónica Virseda	4–6 / 6–2 / 6–1	(Italy) Carolina Orsi (Spain) Carla Mesa	
23/11/2023	(Argentina) Aranzazu Osoro (Spain) Jessica Castelló	6–3 / 6–4	(Spain) Nuria Rodriguez (Spain) Marta Talaván	
23/11/2023	(Spain) Bea González (Argentina) Delfina Brea	6–1 / 6–3	(Sweden) Carolina Navarro (Spain) Marina Guinart	

=== Quarter-Finals ===
Men's

Date	Winners	Score	Opponent	Refs.
24/11/2023	(Argentina) Agustín Tapia (Spain) Arturo Coello	6–2 / 6–4	(Spain) Francisco Guerrero (Spain) Teodoro Zapata	
24/11/2023	(Spain) Alejandro Arroyo (Spain) Eduardo Alonso	6–4 / 7–6	(Spain) Javi Garrido (Spain) Momo González	
24/11/2023	(Argentina) Leo Augsburger (Argentina) Valentino Libaak	6–7 / 7–5 / 6–3	(Brazil) Lucas Bergamini (Spain) Víctor Ruiz	
24/11/2023	(Argentina) Franco Stupaczuk (Argentina) Martin Di Nenno	6–4 / 6–1	(Spain) Javier Ruiz (Spain) Pablo Cardona	

Women's

Date	Winners	Score	Opponent	Refs.
24/11/2023	(Spain) Jimena Velasco (Spain) Noa Canovas	6–4 / 6–4	(Spain) Claudia Fernandez (Spain) Victoria Iglesias	
24/11/2023	(Spain) Tamara Icardo (Argentina) Virginia Riera	7–6 / 7–5	(Portugal) Ana Catarina Nogueira (Spain) Beatriz Caldera	
24/11/2023	(Argentina) Claudia Jensen (Spain) Verónica Virseda	1–6 / 6–4 / 6–4	(Spain) Alejandra Salazar (Portugal) Sofia Araújo	
24/11/2023	(Spain) Bea González (Argentina) Delfina Brea	6–3 / 6–7 / 6–2	(Argentina) Aranzazu Osoro (Spain) Jessica Castelló	

=== Semi-Finals ===
Men's

Date	Winners	Score	Opponent	Refs.
25/11/2023	(Argentina) Agustín Tapia (Spain) Arturo Coello	6–2 / 6–4	(Spain) Alejandro Arroyo (Spain) Eduardo Alonso	
25/11/2023	(Argentina) Leo Augsburger (Argentina) Valentino Libaak	3–6 / 6–1 / 7–6	(Argentina) Franco Stupaczuk (Argentina) Martin Di Nenno	

Women's

Date	Winners	Score	Opponent	Refs.
25/11/2023	(Spain) Tamara Icardo (Argentina) Virginia Riera	6–4 / 6–4	(Spain) Jimena Velasco (Spain) Noa Canovas	
25/11/2023	(Spain) Bea González (Argentina) Delfina Brea	6–2 / 6–4	(Argentina) Claudia Jensen (Spain) Verónica Virseda	

=== Finals ===
Men's

Date	Winners	Score	Opponent	Refs.
26/11/2023	(Argentina) Agustín Tapia (Spain) Arturo Coello	6–4 / 6–2	(Argentina) Leo Augsburger (Argentina) Valentino Libaak	

Women's

Date	Winners	Score	Opponent	Refs.
26/11/2023	(Spain) Bea González (Argentina) Delfina Brea	6–4 / 6–2	(Spain) Tamara Icardo (Argentina) Virginia Riera	
