= Arturo Coello =

Spanish padel player (born 2002)

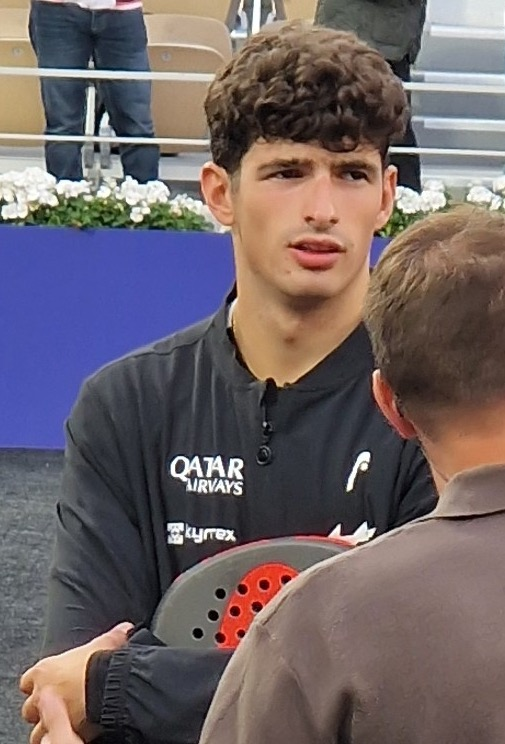

Personal information
- Full name: Arturo Coello Manso
- Nickname: El Rey Arturo
- Born: August 3, 2002 (age 24) Mojados, Valladolid, Spain
- Height: 1.90 m (6 ft 3 in)

Sport
- Country: Spain
- Sport: pádel
- Position: Drive (right-side)
- Rank: 1st (Premier Padel)
- Turned pro: 2019
- Partner: Agustín Tapia

Achievements and titles
- World finals: 2021
- Highest world ranking: 1st (2023, 2024, 2025, 2026)
- Updated on 31 October 2026

Arturo Coello Manso (born 8 March 2002), known as Arturo Coello, is a professional Spanish padel forehand player. He currently holds the number 1 position in the FIP ranking, with his partner Agustín Tapia, forming the current number one ranked padel pair in padel main circuit, Premier Padel.

Arturo won his first tournaments as a professional alongside Fernando Belasteguín in the 2022 World Padel Tour, before joining Agustín Tapia and becoming number 1 ranked team in the circuit next edition edition, a feat they repeated in Premier Padel in 2024, 2025 and 2026.

== Padel Career ==
=== First years ===
Arturo Coello began his career in the World Padel Tour in 2017 alongside Alberto Rea, but it wasn't until 2019 that he began to climb the rankings. In 2019 he played with Pincho Fernández, Fran Ramírez Navas and Guga Vázquez.

=== Different partners ===
==== 2020–2021 ====
In 2020 he played with Iván Ramírez, while in 2021 he started the season with Miguel Lamperti. In their first tournament together, the Madrid Open, they eliminated Martín Di Nenno & Paquito Navarro (the world number 4 pair) and surprisingly reached the semifinals, where they were defeated by the number 2 pair, Fernando Belasteguín & Sanyo Gutiérrez. They repeated the feat at the following tournament by eliminating the number 3 ranked pair, Agustín Tapia & Pablo Lima, although, once again, they failed to reach the finals. In the five next tournaments, they did not reach the quarterfinals on any occasion, and in July they chose to end their partnership, with Javi Ruiz becoming his new partner.

With Javi Ruiz, he reached the semi-finals of the Málaga Open, after defeating the world number 1s, Alejandro Galán & Juan Lebrón. In September, Coello was forced to play with Alejandro Arroyo at the Barcelona Master and the Lugo Open, due to an injury to Javi Ruiz, achieving a surprising semi-final in the second. Once both tournaments were over, the separation of Javi Ruiz and Coello as a pair was confirmed, with Fernando Belasteguín becoming his new partner.

=== Partnership with Fernando Belasteguín ===
With five tournaments remaining, Belasteguín announced that Arturo Coello would be his next partner. They made their debut as the sixth seeded team, in the Menorca Open, being eliminated in the round of 32. In the Córdoba Open, Belasteguín and Coello faced Belasteguín's last two partners, Sanyo and Tapia, in the quarter-finals, advancing to the semi-finals where they lost to Paquito Navarro & Martín Di Nenno.

They finished the season with quarter-final exits in the Swedish Open and Buenos Aires Master, and a round of 16 elimination at the Mexico Open. In the Master Final, Belasteguín and Coello finished the season with a loss to Di Nenno & Paquito in the quarter-finals. Despite not winning a title and Belasteguín finishing the season ranked 9th individually, the results were satisfactying enough to continue together one more season.

In November 2021, he was called up to the Spanish national team for the 2021 Padel World Championship, which Spain won. Coello played in one of the final matches, where he and Alejandro Galán secured the victory.

==== 2022 ====
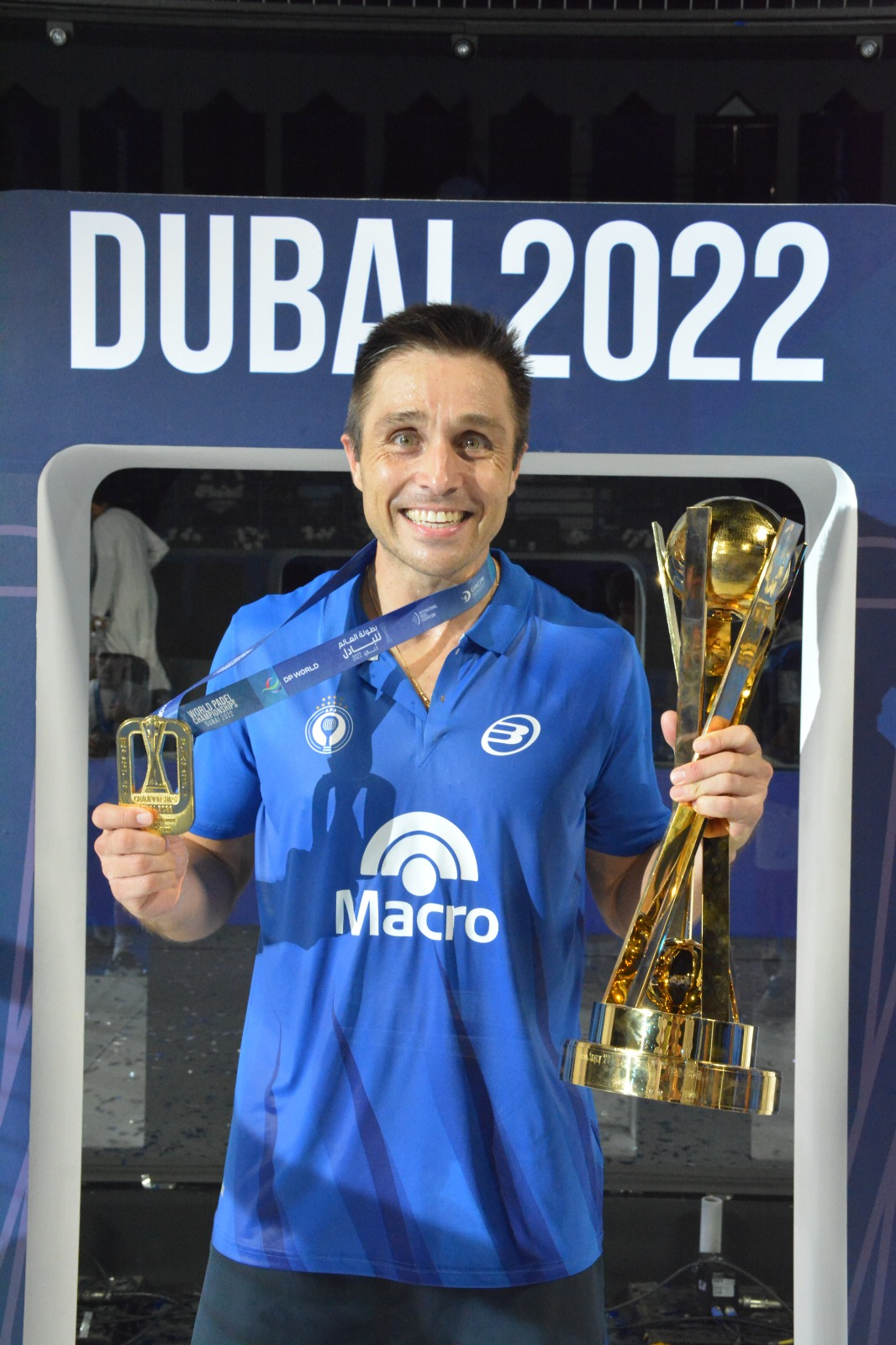
Fernando Belasteguín, who partnered Coello for one and half seasons.

Belasteguín and Coello started 2022, ranked seventh as a team, with them gradually improving their position during the year. They started the season winning the Miami Open. However, in the next three tournaments, they were defeated before the semifinals each time. They then competed in the inaugural Premier Padel tournament, the Qatar Major, reaching the quarter-finals, and improved their results reaching the Brussels Open and Premier Padel's Italy Major semi-finals.

In the following four tournaments, they would reach the semifinals only once, in Vienna, where they were defeated by the world number ones. The rematch would come in the Valladolid Master, where they advanced to the final, but were again defeated by Galán & Lebrón. In the five tournaments leading to the summer break, they suffered an unexpected first-round defeat at the Málaga Open and reached three more quarterfinals, however, their best performance camed at the Mendoza P1, where they lost in the finals a third-set tiebreak to Franco Stupaczuk & Pablo Lima.

Belasteguín and Coello performances would improve in the last third of the season, starting in the return to World Padel Tour, by reaching the semi-finals in both the Portugal and Swedish Open's. Next they won the Madrid Master, defeating the top ranked team, Alejandro Galán & Juan Lebrón in the semi-finals, and won the Amsterdam Open, after defeating Franco Stupaczuk & Pablo Lima in the final. They would also reach the final of the Santander Open, but were defeated by Martín Di Nenno & Paquito Navarro. They would reach their seventh final of the season two tournaments later in the Buenos Aires Master, where they were defeated by Galán & Lebrón, who had also eliminated them in the semi-finals of Premier Padel's NewGiza P1.

Before the Master Final they competed in two Premier Padel tournaments, winning the Mexico Major, by defeating their future partners Agustín Tapia & Sanyo Gutiérrez in the finals, and reaching the semi-finals of the Milan P1. At the Master Final, Belasteguín and Coello were eliminated in the quarter-finals, finishing the season as the third-ranked team, slightly behind the second-ranked, Sanyo & Tapia.

=== Partnership with Agustín Tapia ===
==== 2023 ====
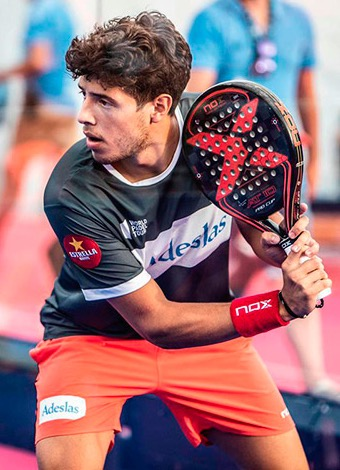
Agustín Tapia, who has partnered Coello for the last four season, finishing as the number one ranked in three of them.

In 2023, Coello joined forces with Agustín Tapia with the goal of dethroning Galán and Lebrón to claim the number one ranking spot. They started the year in the best possible way, defeating the world numbers ones in two sets at the finals of the Abu Dhabi Master, demonstrating their ability to challenge for the number one ranking that year. Next, they were eliminated by Franco Stupaczuk & Martín Di Nenno, who would be their main rival during the season, in the semifinals of Premier Padel's Qatar Major but reacted in the best possible way, winning the La Rioja Open in Argentina, beating the young pair of Augsburguer & Libaak in the final, and maintaining their invincibility in WPT. They continued their strong run, at the next World Padel Tour event, the Chile Open, winning their third title of the year, after defeating Galán & Lebrón in a 3-sets final, in a match marred by controversial refereeing decisions in the second set. In the next three tournaments, the Paraguay, Granada and Brussels Open's, they faced Franco Stupaczuk & Martín Di Nenno in the finals, winning the three and closing the gap to the first ranking spot.

On 14th May, Coello and Tapia faced Alejandro Galán & Juan Lebrón in the Vigo Open final, winning 6–3 / 6–7 / 7–6, claiming their seventh title of the year, becoming the number one ranked team in the circuit and at 21 years, 2 months and 21 days, Coello became the youngest player in history to reach number 1. They missed the following tournament but upon returning won the Vienna Open, beating once again Di Nenno & Stupaczuk, and the Marbella Master clinching their nine consecutive WPT title of the season. After missing the French Open due to physical issues, the new world number ones reached the finals of the Valladolid Master, where they lost their first WPT match of the season to Franco Stupaczuk & Martín Di Nenno, thereby ending a 46 match winning streak. At the following tournament in Valencia, Coello and Tapia suffered their first pre-final defeat, being eliminated in the semifinals by Galán & Jon Sanz, but went on to win the last WPT tournament before the summer break in Málaga, heading into the summer break with ten out of a possible fourteen World Padel Tour titles.

During the break, they played three Premier Padel tournaments, the Italy Major and the Madrid and Mendoza P1s, winning all of them. The return to WPT events began with a surprising Round of 16 loss at the Finland Open against Lucas Bergamini and Victor Ruiz, but was followed by a fourth Premier Padel trophy of the season: the Paris Major, played at Stade Roland Garros. The worst stretch of the season for both came in the following five tournaments, where they managed to reach only two finals, losing in Madrid Master to Di Nenno & Stupaczuk, and in Menorca Open to Galán and a returning Lebrón.

However, by winning the Mexico Open, the penultimate tournament on the WPT calendar, Coello and Tapia mathematically secured the year-end number one spot in the WPT rankings. In the final two events of the year, the Premier Padel Milan P1 and the Master Finals, which marked the last-ever tournament in World Padel Tour history, they would only reach the semifinals in both; nevertheless, the combined results from WPT and Premier tournaments allowed Coello and Tapia to claim 15 titles out of 28 events played, setting a record for the most titles won in a single season.

==== 2024 ====
In 2024, following the conflict between WPT and Premier Padel/FIP, which led the FIP to disregard 2023 World Padel Tour tournaments for ranking purposes, and with Premier Padel now established as the premier circuit, Coello and Tapia began the year as the world's number two pair, despite having finished the previous year in the top spot. In the first tournament of the season, the Riyadh P1, they would reach the finals where they faced and lost to Galán & Lebrón in three sets.

They recovered winning the Qatar Major dropping only two games in the final, winning the Acapulco P1 after beating Galán & Lebrón in their last match together at the finals, and defeating Federico Chingotto & Galán to win the Puerto Cabello P2. In the next two tournaments, they would lose twice to Chingotto & Galán, first in the Brussels final and then in the semifinals of the Seville P2, which would turn out to be the only tournament of the season where they failed to reach the final. In the six remaining tournaments leading up to the summer break, Coello and Tapia faced 'ChinGalán' in every final; they won the Asunción P2 and the Santiago and Málaga P1s, but lost the Mar del Plata P1, the Genoa P2, and the Italy Major, heading into the break with a 4–5 head-to-head record (4–4 in finals) against their rivals.

Coello and Tapia returned from the summer break unstoppable, facing Chingotto & Galán four times in the span of a month and defeating them on every occasion to win the Madrid and Rotterdam P1s, the Valladolid P2, and the Paris Major, thus reaching their 25th title in just 46 tournaments played and 33 finals contested. After not competing in the season's nineteenth tournament in Egypt, they reached four more finals during the second half of November and the first half of December, winning all of them to claim the Dubai, Kuwait, and Milan P1's, as well as the Mexico Major. By winning the tournament in Mexico, they mathematically secured finishing the season as the world number ones in the ranking, and with their victory in Milan, they claimed their ninth consecutive title and extended their winning streak to 45 straight matches.

Thus, the 'Golden Boys' headed into the Premier Padel Finals having won 14 of the 20 Premier Padel circuit tournaments they had entered, reaching every final except the one in Seville, and closing the regular season with a record of 93 wins in 99 matches. They reached the final of the season's last event but were surprisingly defeated in three sets by Coki Nieto & Jon Sanz.

==== 2025 ====
2025 began just like the previous year, with Coello and Tapia reaching the finals of the season's opening tournament in Riyadh, this time against the world's number 3 pair, Franco Stupaczuk and Juan Lebrón, and winning in three sets. They did not compete in the Gijón and Cancún P2 events, along with other top-100 players, due to disputes between Premier Padel and the Professional Padel Players Association. They returned at the Miami P1, where they were eliminated in the semifinals by Lebrón & Stupaczuk, failing to reach a final for the first time in nearly a year (324 days). At the subsequent tournament in Santiago, they not only suffered their earliest elimination in Premier Padel events but also missed out on the final in two consecutive tournaments (among those they played) for the first time.

They stepped up their game by defeating Chingotto & Galán in the season's first 'SuperClásico' to win the Qatar Major, and repeated the feat a week later to claim the Brussels P2, extending their head-to-head record against 'ChinGalán' to 12–5 and reaching a 296-day unbeaten streak against their rivals. However, at the season's eighth tournament in Asunción, they suffered a shock quarter-final exit at the hands of the 16th-ranked pair, Juanlu Esbri & Salvador Oria. After the unexpected defeat in Asunción, they embarked on a run lasting over a year in which they reached every final, starting with the Buenos Aires P1, where they defeated Lucas Bergamini & Paquito Navarro, followed by the Italy Major, where they were beaten by Galán & Chingotto, ending a 343-day unbeaten streak against their rivals. In the four tournaments leading up to the summer break, they defeated Lebrón & Stupaczuk to win the Valladolid P2, securing their 34th title and surpassing the Galán & Lebrón pairing in trophies won, and beat 'ChinGalán' at the Bordeaux P2 and the Málaga and Tarragona P1s, reaching a total of 37 titles and becoming the second most successful pair of all time by overtaking Fernando Belasteguín & Pablo Lima (who had 36).

In the first tournament after the break, the Madrid P1, they reached the final but were defeated by Leandro Augsburger and Martín Di Nenno, who beat all the top-3 pairs on their way to the title. In the following four tournaments both Coello–Tapia and Chingotto–Galán reached the finals with the 'Golden Boys' winning the Paris Major and the Rotterdam P1 (their 40th title as a pair), and 'ChinGalán' winning the Germany P2 and the Milan P1. After not competing in the NewGiza P2, they wrapped up the season by competing in four more tournaments and facing 'ChinGalán' in every final. Although they were defeated by them in the FIP Pairs World Cup finals, they finished the regular season by winning the Dubai P1 and the Mexico Major, mathematically securing the world number 1 ranking for the third consecutive year. With the win in Mexico, Coello and Tapia also became the third most successful pair in history, reaching 54 finals across 66 tournaments, making the finals 81.8% of the time (winning 41 of the 54 finals played, a 75.9% success rate), and amassing a total of 41 titles. Their last encounter of the season took place in the Premier Padel Finals, where they won the season-ending tournament in three sets and extended their head-to-head record against their rivals to 20–9.

== Honours ==
=== World Padel Tour (2019–2023) ===
Winner Runner-up

==== Finals ====
N.º	Date	Tournament	Partner	Result	Opponents in the final	Career title No.
1.	27 February 2022	(United States) Miami Open	(Argentina) Fernando Belasteguín	6–3 / 7–6	(Spain) Javier Garrido (Brazil) Lucas Campagnolo	1st
2.	26 June 2022	(Spain) Valladolid Master	(Argentina) Fernando Belasteguín	4–6 / 6–7	(Spain) Alejandro Galán (Spain) Juan Lebrón	
3.	25 September 2022	(Spain) Madrid Master	(Argentina) Fernando Belasteguín	6–4 / 6–2	(Spain) Álex Ruiz (Spain) Momo González	2nd
4.	2 October 2022	(Netherlands) Amsterdam Open	(Argentina) Fernando Belasteguín	6–2 / 7–5	(Argentina) Franco Stupaczuk (Brazil) Pablo Lima	3rd
5.	9 October 2022	(Spain) Santander Open	(Argentina) Fernando Belasteguín	2–6 / 0–6	(Argentina) Martín Di Nenno (Spain) Paquito Navarro	
6.	20 November 2022	(Argentina) Buenos Aires Master	(Argentina) Fernando Belasteguín	6–7 / 2–6	(Spain) Alejandro Galán (Spain) Juan Lebrón	
7.	26 February 2023	(United Arab Emirates) Abu Dhabi Master	(Argentina) Agustín Tapia	7–6 / 6–3	(Spain) Alejandro Galán (Spain) Juan Lebrón	4th
8.	12 March 2023	(Argentina) La Rioja Open	(Argentina) Agustín Tapia	6–1 / 6–0	(Argentina) Leandro Augsburger (Argentina) Valentino Libaak	5th
9.	19 March 2023	Chile Open	(Argentina) Agustín Tapia	6–4 / 6–7 / 7–5	(Spain) Alejandro Galán (Spain) Juan Lebrón	6th
10.	26 March 2023	Paraguay Open	(Argentina) Agustín Tapia	6–2 / 6–1	(Argentina) Franco Stupaczuk (Argentina) Martín Di Nenno	7th
11.	16 April 2023	(Spain) Granada Open	(Argentina) Agustín Tapia	6–4 / 7–5	(Argentina) Franco Stupaczuk (Argentina) Martín Di Nenno	8th
12.	30 April 2023	(Belgium) Brussels Open	(Argentina) Agustín Tapia	7–6 / 3–6 / 6–3	(Argentina) Franco Stupaczuk (Argentina) Martín Di Nenno	9th
13.	14 May 2023	(Spain) Vigo Open	(Argentina) Agustín Tapia	6–3 / 6–7 / 7–6	(Spain) Alejandro Galán (Spain) Juan Lebrón	10th
14.	28 May 2023	(Austria) Vienna Open	(Argentina) Agustín Tapia	6–3 / 6–3	(Argentina) Franco Stupaczuk (Argentina) Martín Di Nenno	11th
15.	4 June 2023	(Spain) Marbella Master	(Argentina) Agustín Tapia	6–3 / 6–2	(Spain) Momo González (Argentina) Sanyo Gutiérrez	12th
16.	25 June 2023	(Spain) Valladolid Master	(Argentina) Agustín Tapia	6–4 / 4–6 / 6–7	(Argentina) Franco Stupaczuk (Argentina) Martín Di Nenno	
17.	30 July 2023	(Spain) Málaga Open	(Argentina) Agustín Tapia	7–5 / 7–6	(Spain) Aléx Ruiz (Argentina) Juan Tello	13th
18.	24 September 2023	(Spain) Madrid Master	(Argentina) Agustín Tapia	5–7 / 4–6	(Argentina) Franco Stupaczuk (Argentina) Martín Di Nenno	
19.	29 October 2023	(Spain) Menorca Open	(Argentina) Agustín Tapia	3–6 / 2–6	(Spain) Alejandro Galán (Spain) Juan Lebrón	
20.	26 November 2023	(Mexico) México Open	(Argentina) Agustín Tapia	6–4 / 6–2	(Argentina) Leandro Augsburger (Argentina) Valentino Libaak	14th

Tournaments won	Challenger	Open	Master	Master Final	Total
Tournaments won	0	11	3	0	14

=== Premier Padel (2022-present) ===
Winner Runner-up

==== Finals ====
N.º	Date	Tournament	Partner	Result	Opponents in the final	Career title No.
21.	14 August 2022	(Argentina) Mendoza P1	(Argentina) Fernando Belasteguín	2–6 / 6–4 / 6–7	(Argentina) Franco Stupaczuk (Brazil) Pablo Lima	
22.	4 December 2022	Mexico Major	(Argentina) Fernando Belasteguín	6–3 / 3–6 / 6–3	(Argentina) Agustín Tapia (Argentina) Sanyo Gutiérrez	15th
23.	16 July 2023	Italy Major	(Argentina) Agustín Tapia	7–5 / 7–6	(Argentina) Federico Chingotto (Spain) Paquito Navarro	16th
24.	23 July 2023	(Spain) Madrid P1	(Argentina) Agustín Tapia	7–5 / 6–2	(Argentina) Federico Chingotto (Spain) Paquito Navarro	17th
25.	6 August 2023	(Argentina) Mendoza P1	(Argentina) Agustín Tapia	6–2 / 7–6	(Argentina) Franco Stupaczuk (Argentina) Martín Di Nenno	18th
26.	10 September 2023	(France) Paris Major	(Argentina) Agustín Tapia	7–6 / 6–1	(Argentina) Federico Chingotto (Spain) Paquito Navarro	19th
27.	2 March 2024	(Saudi Arabia) Riyadh P1	(Argentina) Agustín Tapia	7–6 / 4–6 / 4–6	(Spain) Alejandro Galán (Spain) Juan Lebrón	
28.	8 March 2024	Qatar Major	(Argentina) Agustín Tapia	6–0 / 6–2	(Spain) Javi Garrido (Spain) Mike Yanguas	20th
29.	24 March 2024	(Mexico) Acapulco P1	(Argentina) Agustín Tapia	6–0 / 6–4	(Spain) Alejandro Galán (Spain) Juan Lebrón	21st
30.	31 March 2024	(Venezuela) Puerto Cabello P2	(Argentina) Agustín Tapia	2–6 / 6–3 / 6–3	(Spain) Alejandro Galán (Argentina) Federico Chingotto	22nd
31.	28 April 2024	(Belgium) Brussels P2	(Argentina) Agustín Tapia	4–6 / 7–6 / 2–6	(Spain) Alejandro Galán (Argentina) Federico Chingotto	
32.	19 May 2024	(Paraguay) Asunción P2	(Argentina) Agustín Tapia	6–1 / 3–6 / 7–6	(Spain) Alejandro Galán (Argentina) Federico Chingotto	23rd
33.	26 May 2024	(Argentina) Mar del Plata P1	(Argentina) Agustín Tapia	6–2 / 2–6 / 2–6	(Spain) Alejandro Galán (Argentina) Federico Chingotto	
34.	3 June 2024	(Chile) Santiago P1	(Argentina) Agustín Tapia	6–0 / 4–6 / 6–4	(Spain) Alejandro Galán (Argentina) Federico Chingotto	24th
35.	23 June 2024	Italy Major	(Argentina) Agustín Tapia	4–6 / 6–1 / 1–6	(Spain) Alejandro Galán (Argentina) Federico Chingotto	
36.	7 July 2024	(Italy) Genoa P2	(Argentina) Agustín Tapia	1–6 / 1–6	(Spain) Alejandro Galán (Argentina) Federico Chingotto	
37.	14 July 2024	(Spain) Málaga P1	(Argentina) Agustín Tapia	6–2 / 6–3	(Spain) Alejandro Galán (Argentina) Federico Chingotto	25th
38.	8 September 2024	(Spain) Madrid P1	(Argentina) Agustín Tapia	6–3 / 7–6	(Spain) Alejandro Galán (Argentina) Federico Chingotto	26th
39.	15 September 2024	(Netherlands) Rotterdam P1	(Argentina) Agustín Tapia	6–2 / 6–2	(Spain) Alejandro Galán (Argentina) Federico Chingotto	27th
40.	22 September 2024	(Spain) Valladolid P2	(Argentina) Agustín Tapia	6–4 / 4–6 / 6–3	(Spain) Alejandro Galán (Argentina) Federico Chingotto	28th
41.	6 October 2024	(France) Paris Major	(Argentina) Agustín Tapia	6–2 / 6–1	(Spain) Alejandro Galán (Argentina) Federico Chingotto	29th
42.	10 November 2024	(United Arab Emirates) Dubai P1	(Argentina) Agustín Tapia	6–4 / 6–3	(Spain) Alejandro Galán (Argentina) Federico Chingotto	30th
43.	17 November 2024	Kuwait P1	(Argentina) Agustín Tapia	6–4 / 6–2	(Argentina) Franco Stupaczuk (Spain) Mike Yanguas	31st
44.	1 December 2024	Mexico Major	(Argentina) Agustín Tapia	4–6 / 6–1 / 6–2	(Argentina) Franco Stupaczuk (Spain) Mike Yanguas	32nd
45.	8 December 2024	(Italy) Milan P1	(Argentina) Agustín Tapia	6–4 / 7–5	(Spain) Alejandro Galán (Argentina) Federico Chingotto	33rd
46.	22 December 2024	(Spain) Premier Padel Finals	(Argentina) Agustín Tapia	6–3 / 5–7 / 3–6	(Spain) Coki Nieto (Spain) Jon Sanz	
47.	15 February 2025	(Saudi Arabia) Riyadh P1	(Argentina) Agustín Tapia	6–3 / 5–7 / 6–3	(Argentina) Franco Stupaczuk (Spain) Juan Lebrón	34th
48.	19 April 2025	Qatar Major	(Argentina) Agustín Tapia	7–6 / 6–2	(Spain) Alejandro Galán (Argentina) Federico Chingotto	35th
49.	27 April 2025	(Belgium) Brussels P2	(Argentina) Agustín Tapia	2–6 / 6–4 / 6–1	(Spain) Alejandro Galán (Argentina) Federico Chingotto	36th
50.	1 June 2025	(Argentina) Buenos Aires P1	(Argentina) Agustín Tapia	6–2 / 6–2	(Brazil) Lucas Bergamini (Spain) Paquito Navarro	37th
51.	15 June 2025	Italy Major	(Argentina) Agustín Tapia	3–6 / 5–7	(Spain) Alejandro Galán (Argentina) Federico Chingotto	
52.	29 June 2025	(Spain) Valladolid P2	(Argentina) Agustín Tapia	7–5 / 6–4	(Argentina) Franco Stupaczuk (Spain) Juan Lebrón	38th
53.	6 July 2025	(France) Bordeaux P2	(Argentina) Agustín Tapia	7–6 / 6–4	(Spain) Alejandro Galán (Argentina) Federico Chingotto	39th
54.	20 July 2025	(Spain) Málaga P1	(Argentina) Agustín Tapia	6–4 / 7–5	(Spain) Alejandro Galán (Argentina) Federico Chingotto	40th
55.	3 August 2025	(Spain) Tarragona P1	(Argentina) Agustín Tapia	7–6 / 7–5	(Spain) Alejandro Galán (Argentina) Federico Chingotto	41st
56.	7 September 2025	(Spain) Madrid P1	(Argentina) Agustín Tapia	6–4 / 3–6 / 4–6	(Argentina) Leandro Augsburger (Argentina) Martín Di Nenno	
57.	14 September 2025	(France) Paris Major	(Argentina) Agustín Tapia	6–1 / 6–4	(Spain) Alejandro Galán (Argentina) Federico Chingotto	42nd
58.	28 September 2025	Germany P2	(Argentina) Agustín Tapia	6–7 / 2–6	(Spain) Alejandro Galán (Argentina) Federico Chingotto	
59.	5 October 2025	(Netherlands) Rotterdam P1	(Argentina) Agustín Tapia	6–3 / 7–6	(Spain) Alejandro Galán (Argentina) Federico Chingotto	43rd
60.	12 October 2025	(Italy) Milan P1	(Argentina) Agustín Tapia	6–2 / 3–6 / 0–6	(Spain) Alejandro Galán (Argentina) Federico Chingotto	
61.	9 November 2025	(Kuwait) FIP Pairs World Cup	(Argentina) Agustín Tapia	6–2 / 5–7 / 2–6	(Spain) Alejandro Galán (Argentina) Federico Chingotto	
62.	16 November 2025	(United Arab Emirates) Dubai P1	(Argentina) Agustín Tapia	6–3 / 6–4	(Spain) Alejandro Galán (Argentina) Federico Chingotto	44th
63.	30 November 2025	Mexico Major	(Argentina) Agustín Tapia	6–4 / 7–6	(Spain) Alejandro Galán (Argentina) Federico Chingotto	45th
64.	14 December 2025	(Spain) Premier Padel Finals	(Argentina) Agustín Tapia	6–7 / 6–3 / 7–6	(Spain) Alejandro Galán (Argentina) Federico Chingotto	46th
65.	14 February 2026	(Saudi Arabia) Riyadh P1	(Argentina) Agustín Tapia	6–4 / 6–2	(Spain) Alejandro Galán (Argentina) Federico Chingotto	47th
66.	8 March 2026	(Spain) Gijón P2	(Argentina) Agustín Tapia	5–7 / 6–7	(Spain) Alejandro Galán (Argentina) Federico Chingotto	
67.	22 March 2026	(Mexico) Cancún P2	(Argentina) Agustín Tapia	6–7 / 6–3 / 7–5	(Spain) Juan Lebrón (Argentina) Leandro Augsburger	48th
68.	29 March 2026	(United States) Miami P1	(Argentina) Agustín Tapia	5–7 / 6–3 / 3–6	(Spain) Alejandro Galán (Argentina) Federico Chingotto	
69.	26 April 2026	(Belgium) Brussels P2	(Argentina) Agustín Tapia	6–2 / 3–6 / 3–6	(Spain) Juan Lebrón (Argentina) Leandro Augsburger	
70.	10 May 2026	(Paraguay) Asunción P2	(Argentina) Agustín Tapia	3–6 / 5–7	(Spain) Alejandro Galán (Argentina) Federico Chingotto	
71.	17 May 2026	(Argentina) Buenos Aires P1	(Argentina) Agustín Tapia	2–6 / 1–6	(Spain) Alejandro Galán (Argentina) Federico Chingotto	
72.	7 June 2026	Italy Major	(Argentina) Agustín Tapia	7–5 / 7–6	(Spain) Alejandro Galán (Argentina) Federico Chingotto	49th
73.	14 June 2026	(Spain) Valencia P1	(Argentina) Agustín Tapia	6–7 / 6–1 / 7–6	(Spain) Alejandro Galán (Argentina) Federico Chingotto	50th
74.	28 June 2026	(Spain) Valladolid P2	(Argentina) Agustín Tapia	6–4 / 6–3	(Spain) Alejandro Galán (Argentina) Federico Chingotto	51st
75.	5 July 2026	(France) Bordeaux P2	(Argentina) Agustín Tapia	5–7 / 7–6 / 6–2	(Spain) Alejandro Galán (Argentina) Federico Chingotto	52nd
76.	19 July 2026	(Spain) Málaga P1	(Argentina) Agustín Tapia	6–2 / 6–2	(Spain) Juan Lebrón (Argentina) Leandro Augsburger	53rd
77.	9 August 2026	(United Kingdom) London P1	(Argentina) Agustín Tapia	6–3 / 5–7 / 7–5	(Spain) Alejandro Galán (Argentina) Federico Chingotto	54th
78.	13 September 2026	(France) Paris Major	(Argentina) Agustín Tapia	6–3 / 4–6 / 7–6	(Spain) Alejandro Galán (Argentina) Federico Chingotto	55th
79.	4 October 2026	(Netherlands) Rotterdam	(Argentina) Agustín Tapia	6–3 / 6–2	(Argentina) Franco Stupaczuk (Spain) Jon Sanz	56th
80.	11 October 2026	Germany P2	(Argentina) Agustín Tapia	6–3 / 6–2	(Argentina) Franco Stupaczuk (Spain) Jon Sanz	57th
81.	18 October 2026	(Italy) Milan P1	(Argentina) Agustín Tapia	4–6 / 6–3 / 6–2	(Spain) Juan Lebrón (Argentina) Leandro Augsburger	58th
82.	31 October 2026	Kuwait Major	(Argentina) Agustín Tapia	6–1 / 6–1	(Argentina) Juan Tello (Argentina) Maximiliano Arce	59th

Tournaments won	P2	P1	Major	PP Finals	FIP Pairs World Cup	Total
Tournaments won	11	21	12	1	0	45

=== Padel World Championship ===
N.º	Year	Opponent	Result
1	2021	Argentina	2–0
2	2026	Argentina	2–1

== Teammates ==
- Alberto Rea (2017)
- Pincho Fernández (2019)
- Fran Ramírez Navas (2019)
- Guga Vázquez (2019)
- Iván Ramírez (01/2020 – 12/2020)
- Miguel Lamperti (01/2021 – 07/2021)
- Javi Ruiz (07/2021 – 09/2021)
- Fernando Belasteguín (09/2021 – 12/2022)
- Agustín Tapia (01/2023 – present)
