= 2022 Mexico Major =

Padel championships

- Date: 28 November – 4 December
- Edition: 1st
- Category: P1
- Prize money: € 525,000
- Location: Giza, Egypt
- Venue: Newgiza Sports Club

Champions
- Men's doubles: (Spain) Arturo Coello (Argentina) Fernando Belasteguín

Chronology
Previous
Mexico Open (WPT)
Next
Milano P1

The 2022 Mexico Major was the seventh tournament of the season organized by Premier Padel, promoted by the International Padel Federation, and with the financial backing of Nasser Al-Khelaïfi's Qatar Sports Investments.

Arturo Coello and Fernando Belasteguín, FIP number 4 ranked team, defeated Agustín Tapia and Sanyo Gutiérrez, FIP number 6 ranked team, in the final, winning their first title in the circuit.

== Seeds ==
1. (Spain) Alejandro Galán / (Spain) Juan Lebrón (quarter-finals)
2. (Argentina) Juan Tello / (Spain) Paquito Navarro (round of 16)
3. (Argentina) Franco Stupaczuk / (Brazil) Pablo Lima (round of 16)
4. (Spain) Arturo Coello / (Argentina) Fernando Belasteguín (winners)
5. (Spain) Coki Nieto / (Argentina) Martin Di Nenno (semi-finals)
6. (Argentina) Agustín Tapia / (Argentina) Sanyo Gutiérrez (final)
7. (Spain) Aléx Ruiz / (Spain) Momo González (quarter-finals)
8. (Argentina) Federico Chingotto / (Spain) Javi Garrido (semi-finals)

== Results ==
Round of 32
1	(Spain) Galán / (Spain) Lebrón	6	6
(Argentina) M. Díaz / (France) T. Leygue	2	1
(Argentina) D. Perino / (Spain) S. Alba	6	3	6
(Argentina) A. Gutiérrez / (Spain) J. Rico	2	6	2
10	(Brazil) L. Campagnolo / (Spain) J. Sanz	6	6
(Spain) G. Campos / (Spain) R. Rivera	3	4
(Spain) M. Quilez / (Spain) T. Bueno	0	1
6	(Argentina) Tapia / (Argentina) Sanyo	6	6
8	(Argentina) Chingotto / (Spain) J. Garrido	6	6
(Spain) D.G.Batista / (Spain) F. Ramirez	2	1
(Spain) E. Alonso / (Spain) J. Esbri	3	4
9	(Argentina) L. Capra / (Argentina) Maxi	6	6
12	(Spain) F. Gil / (Argentina) R. Moyano	6	7
(Brazil) C. Gomes / (Argentina) I. Sager	2	5
(Spain) C. Marti / (Spain) M. Ortega	4	1
3	(Argentina) F. Stupaczuk / (Brazil) Lima	6	6
4	(Argentina) Belasteguín / (Spain) Coello	6	7
(Spain) J.G. Diestro / (Spain) P. Fernandéz	3	5
(Spain) I. Vilariño / (Spain) J. Muñoz	3	5
15	(Spain) J. Ruiz / (Spain) P. Lijó	6	7
11	(Argentina) J.C. Belluati / (Argentina) A. Silingo	6	6
(Spain) J. Fermosell / (Spain) M. Solbes	0	3
(Argentina) A. Bejarano / (Argentina) M. Almada	3	6	1
7	(Spain) A. Ruíz / (Spain) Momo	6	3	6
5	(Spain) Coki / (Argentina) Di Nenno	6	6
(Spain) J. Ruiz / (Spain) S. Oria	3	3
(Argentina) A. Patiniotis / (Argentina) C.G. Gutiérrez	0	5
13	(Spain) A. Arroyo / (Spain) G. Rubio	6	7
14	(Brazil) L. Bergamini / (Spain) V. Ruiz	6	6
(Spain) J.G. Barahona / (Spain) J.G. Mora	4	3
(Spain) A. Ayats / (Chile) J. Valdes	4	6	5
2	(Argentina) J. Tello / (Spain) Paquito	6	3	7

Round of 16
1	(Spain) Galán / (Spain) Lebrón	6	6
(Argentina) D. Perino / (Spain) S. Alba	2	0
10	(Spain) J. Sanz / (Brazil) L. Campagnolo	1	4
6	(Argentina) Tapia / (Spain) Sanyo	6	6
8	(Argentina) Chingotto / (Spain) J. Garrido	6	6
6	(Argentina) L. Capra / (Argentina) Maxi	2	2
12	(Spain) F. Gil / (Argentina) R. Moyano	*
6	(Argentina) Stupaczuk / (Brazil) Lima
4	(Argentina) Belasteguín / (Spain) Coello	*
19	(Spain) J. Ruiz / (Spain) P. Lijó
11	(Argentina) A. Silingo / (Argentina) J.C. Belluati	1	2
7	(Spain) A. Ruíz / (Spain) Momo	6	6
5	(Spain) Coki / (Argentina) / Di Nenno	6	6
13	(Spain) A. Arroyo / (Spain) G. Rubio	3	1
14	(Brazil) L. Bergamini / (Spain) V. Ruiz	6	3	6
2	(Argentina) Juan Tello / (Spain) Paquito	4	6	3

Quarterfinals
1	(Spain) Galán / (Spain) Lebrón	6	3	3
6	(Argentina) Tapia / (Argentina) Sanyo	3	6	6
8	(Argentina) Chingotto / (Spain) J. Garrido	7	6
12	(Spain) F. Gil / (Argentina) R. Moyano	5	1
4	(Argentina) Belasteguín / (Spain) Coello	6	7
7	(Spain) A. Ruíz / (Spain) Momo	1	5
5	(Spain) Coki / (Argentina) Di Nenno	6	6
14	(Brazil) L. Bergamini / (Spain) V. Ruiz	2	1

Semifinals
6	(Argentina) Tapia / (Argentina) Sanyo	6	6	7
8	(Argentina) Chingotto / (Spain) J. Garrido	2	7	5
4	(Argentina) Belasteguín / (Spain) Coello	7	6
5	(Spain) Coki / (Argentina) Di Nenno	6	4

Final
6	(Argentina) Tapia / (Argentina) Sanyo	3	6	3
4	(Argentina) Belasteguín / (Spain) Coello	6	3	6

=== First Round ===
Date	Winners	Score	Opponent	Refs.
29/11/2022	(Argentina) Matías Díaz (France) Thomas Leygue	6–3 / 6–3	(Spain) Alvaro Melendez Amaya (Spain) Pedro Melendez Amaya	
29/11/2022	(Argentina) Denis Perino (Spain) Sergio Alba	7–6 / 6–3	(Spain) Adrian Ronco (Spain) Jaime Menendez Gil	
29/11/2022	(Argentina) Agustín Gutiérrez (Spain) José Rico	6–3 / 6–2	(Italy) Lorenzo Di Giovanni (Argentina) Mauro Salandro	
29/11/2022	(Spain) Jon Sanz (Brazil) Lucas Campagnolo	6–3 / 7–5	(Argentina) Ignacio Piotto (Sweden) Simon Vasquez	
29/11/2022	(Spain) Gaspar Campos (Spain) Rubén Rivera	6–3 / 6–3	(Argentina) Juan Ignacio Rubini (Mexico) Octavio Lara	
29/11/2022	(Spain) Marc Quilez (Spain) Toni Bueno	6–7 / 7–5 / 6–3	(Spain) Aitor Garcia Bassas (Spain) Pedro Vera Castillo	
29/11/2022	(Spain) Diego Gil Batista (Spain) Fran Ramirez	6–1 / 6–4	(Belgium) Jerome Peeters (France) Maxime Moreau	
29/11/2022	(Spain) Eduardo Alonso (Spain) Juanlu Esbri	6–4 / 6–3	(France) Jeremy Scatena (Spain) Roger Aromi	
29/11/2022	(Argentina) Lucho Capra (Argentina) Maxi Sánchez	6–4 / 3–6 / 6–4	(Spain) Adriá Mercadal Berenguer (Spain) Ricardo Martinez Sanchez	
29/11/2022	(Spain) Francisco Gil Morales (Argentina) Ramiro Moyano	6–4 / 6–3	(Spain) Iván Ramírez (Spain) Raúl Marcos Duran	
29/11/2022	(Brazil) Chico Gomes (Argentina) Ignacio Sager	6–3 / 6–4	(Argentina) Ivo Andenmatten (Argentina) Relis Ferreyra	
29/11/2022	(Spain) Carlos Marti (Spain) Mario Ortega	6–1 / 6–2	(Mexico) Pablo Amora (Mexico) Raúl Méndez	
29/11/2022	(Spain) José García Diestro (Spain) Pincho Fernandéz	6–2 / 6–1	(Mexico) Fabián Mujica (Mexico) José Angel Montoya	
29/11/2022	(Spain) Ignacio Vilariño (Spain) Jaime Muñoz	6–2 / 6–3	(Spain) Jose David Sanchez Serrano (Spain) Miguel Semmler	
29/11/2022	(Spain) Javi Ruiz (Spain) Pablo Lijó	7–6 / 7––6	(Argentina) Federico Mouriño (Spain) Victor Mena Gil	
29/11/2022	(Argentina) Agustin Gomez Silingo (Argentina) Juan Cruz Belluati	6–2 / 4–6 / 6–4	(Spain) Alvaro Cépero (Argentina) Miguel Lamperti	
29/11/2022	(Spain) Jaime Fermosell (Spain) Miguel Solbes	3–6 / 7–6 / 6–4	(France) Benjamin Tison (Argentina) Facundo Domínguez	
29/11/2022	(Argentina) Amilcar Bejarano (Argentina) Matías Almada	4–6 / 7–5 / 6–1	(Argentina) Emiliano Iriart (Spain) Marcos Cordoba	
29/11/2022	(Spain) Jorge Ruiz (Spain) Salvador Oria	6–4 / 7–6	(Spain) Antonio Luque (Spain) Sergio Icardo	
29/11/2022	(Argentina) Aris Patiniotis (Argentina) Cristian German Gutiérrez	6–7 / 6–4 / 7–6	(Spain) Jose Luis Gonzalez (Spain) Miguel González García	
29/11/2022	(Spain) Alejandro Arroyo (Spain) Gonzalo Rubio	6–2 / 6–1	(Spain) Javier Navarro Perez (Spain) Jose Roman Martinez	
29/11/2022	(Brazil) Lucas Bergamini (Spain) Victor Ruiz	6–4 / 6–4	(Spain) Anton Sans (Spain) Teodoro Zapata	
29/11/2022	(Spain) Javier Gonzalez Barahona (Spain) Javier García Mora	6–2 / 6–4	(Spain) Aday Santana (Argentina) Nicolás Suescun	
29/11/2022	(Spain) Arnau Ayats (Chile) Javier Valdes	6–4 / 6–4	(Spain) Carlos Perez Cabeza (Spain) Jesus Moya	

=== Round of 32 ===
Date	Winners	Score	Opponent	Refs.
30/11/2022	(Spain) Alejandro Galán (Spain) Juan Lebrón	6–2 / 6–1	(Argentina) Matías Díaz (France) Thomas Leygue	
30/11/2022	(Argentina) Denis Perino (Spain) Sergio Alba	6–2 / 3–6 / 6–2	(Argentina) Agustín Gutiérrez (Spain) José Rico	
30/11/2022	(Spain) Jon Sanz (Brazil) Lucas Campagnolo	6–3 / 6–4	(Spain) Gaspar Campos (Spain) Rubén Rivera	
30/11/2022	(Argentina) Agustín Tapia (Argentina) Sanyo Gutiérrez	6–0 / 6–1	(Spain) Marc Quilez (Spain) Toni Bueno	
30/11/2022	(Argentina) Federico Chingotto (Spain) Javi Garrido	6–2 / 6–1	(Spain) Diego Gil Batista (Spain) Fran Ramirez	
30/11/2022	(Argentina) Lucho Capra (Argentina) Maxi Sánchez	6–3 / 6–4	(Spain) Eduardo Alonso (Spain) Juanlu Esbri	
30/11/2022	(Spain) Francisco Gil Morales (Argentina) Ramiro Moyano	6–2 / 7–5	(Brazil) Chico Gomes (Argentina) Ignacio Sager	
30/11/2022	(Argentina) Franco Stupaczuk (Brazil) Pablo Lima	6–4 / 6–1	(Spain) Carlos Marti (Spain) Mario Ortega	
30/11/2022	(Spain) Arturo Coello (Argentina) Fernando Belasteguín	6–3 / 7–5	(Spain) José García Diestro (Spain) Pincho Fernandéz	
30/11/2022	(Spain) Javi Ruiz (Spain) Pablo Lijó	6–3 / 7–5	(Spain) Ignacio Vilariño (Spain) Jaime Muñoz	
30/11/2022	(Argentina) Agustin Gomez Silingo (Argentina) Juan Cruz Belluati	6–0 / 6–3	(Spain) Jaime Fermosell (Spain) Miguel Solbes	
30/11/2022	(Spain) Alex Ruiz (Spain) Momo Gonzalez	6–3 / 3–6 / 6–1	(Argentina) Amilcar Bejarano (Argentina) Matías Almada	
30/11/2022	(Spain) Coki Nieto (Argentina) Martin Di Nenno	6–3 / 6–3	(Spain) Jorge Ruiz (Spain) Salvador Oria	
30/11/2022	(Spain) Alejandro Arroyo (Spain) Gonzalo Rubio	6–0 / 7–5	(Argentina) Aris Patiniotis (Argentina) Cristian German Gutiérrez	
30/11/2022	(Brazil) Lucas Bergamini (Spain) Victor Ruiz	6–4 / 6–3	(Spain) Javier Gonzalez Barahona (Spain) Javier García Mora	
30/11/2022	(Argentina) Juan Tello (Spain) Paquito Navarro	6–4 / 3–6 / 7–5	(Spain) Arnau Ayats (Chile) Javier Valdes	

=== Round of 16 ===
Date	Winners	Score	Opponent	Refs.
1/12/2022	(Spain) Alejandro Galán (Spain) Juan Lebrón	6–2 / 6–0	(Argentina) Denis Perino (Spain) Sergio Alba	
1/12/2022	(Argentina) Agustín Tapia (Argentina) Sanyo Gutiérrez	6–1 / 6–4	(Spain) Jon Sanz (Brazil) Lucas Campagnolo	
1/12/2022	(Argentina) Federico Chingotto (Spain) Javi Garrido	6–2 / 6–2	(Argentina) Lucho Capra (Argentina) Maxi Sánchez	
1/12/2022	(Spain) Francisco Gil Morales (Argentina) Ramiro Moyano	W.O.	(Argentina) Franco Stupaczuk (Brazil) Pablo Lima	
1/12/2022	(Spain) Arturo Coello (Argentina) Fernando Belasteguín	W.O.	(Spain) Javi Ruiz (Spain) Pablo Lijó	
1/12/2022	(Spain) Alex Ruiz (Spain) Momo Gonzalez	6–1 / 6–2	(Argentina) Agustin Gomez Silingo (Argentina) Juan Cruz Belluati	
1/12/2022	(Spain) Coki Nieto (Argentina) Martin Di Nenno	6–3 / 6–1	(Spain) Alejandro Arroyo (Spain) Gonzalo Rubio	
1/12/2022	(Brazil) Lucas Bergamini (Spain) Victor Ruiz	6–4 / 3–6 / 6–3	(Argentina) Juan Tello (Spain) Paquito Navarro	

=== Quarter-Finals ===
Date	Winners	Score	Opponent	Refs.
2/12/2022	(Argentina) Agustín Tapia (Argentina) Sanyo Gutiérrez	3–6 / 6–3 / 6–3	(Spain) Alejandro Galán (Spain) Juan Lebrón	
2/12/2022	(Argentina) Federico Chingotto (Spain) Javi Garrido	7–5 / 6–1	(Spain) Francisco Gil Morales (Argentina) Ramiro Moyano	
2/12/2022	(Spain) Arturo Coello (Argentina) Fernando Belasteguín	6–1 / 7–5	(Spain) Alex Ruiz (Spain) Momo Gonzalez	
2/12/2022	(Spain) Coki Nieto (Argentina) Martin Di Nenno	6–2 / 6–1	(Brazil) Lucas Bergamini (Spain) Victor Ruiz	

=== Semi-Finals ===
Date	Winners	Score	Opponent	Refs.
3/12/2022	(Argentina) Agustín Tapia (Argentina) Sanyo Gutiérrez	6–2 / 6–7 / 7–5	(Argentina) Federico Chingotto (Spain) Javi Garrido	
3/12/2022	(Spain) Arturo Coello (Argentina) Fernando Belasteguín	7–6 / 6–4	(Spain) Coki Nieto (Argentina) Martin Di Nenno	

=== Finals ===
Date	Winners	Score	Opponent	Refs.
4/12/2022	(Spain) Arturo Coello (Argentina) Fernando Belasteguín	6–3 / 3–6 / 6–3	(Argentina) Agustín Tapia (Argentina) Sanyo Gutiérrez	

== Points distribution ==
Below is a series of tables showing the ranking points and money a player can earn.

Event	First round	Second Round	Round of 16	QF	SF	F	W
Points	40	90	180	360	750	1200	2000
Money	€1500	€2900	€5250	€8500	€13000	€23600	€47300
