= 2023 Menorca Open =

Padel championships

- Date: 23 October – 29 October
- Edition: 5th
- Category: Open
- Location: Menorca, Spain
- Venue: Pavelló Menorca

Champions
- Men's doubles: (Spain) Alejandro Galán (Spain) Juan Lebrón
- Women's doubles: (Spain) Gemma Triay (Spain) Marta Ortega

Chronology

The WPT 2023 Menorca Open (officially WPT 2023 Estrella Damm Menorca Open) was the nineteenth tournament of the eleventh edition of World Padel Tour. The tournament was played between 23rd October and 29th October of 2023 at Pavelló Menorca in Menorca, Spain.

In the women's category, the first and second ranked pairs met in the finals for the fifth time, with the number two team Gemma Triay and Marta Ortega defeating Ariana Sánchez and Paula Josemaría to win their first title as pair after five consecutive finals losses.

In the men's category, the first and third ranked teams met in the finals, with Alejandro Galán and Juan Lebrón defeating the first ranked Agustín Tapia and Arturo Coello, winning their third of the season.

== Schedule ==
The final draw was played:

- Thursday 25 October: Round of 32.
- Thursday 26 October: Round of 16.
- Friday 27 October: Quarterfinals.
- Saturday 28 October: Semifinals.
- Sunday 29 October: Finals.

== Results ==
=== Men's Bracket ===
Round of 32
1	(Spain) Coello / (Argentina) Tapia	6	6	6
(Spain) F. Gil / (Argentina) R. Moyano	3	7	4
(Spain) L. Quesada / (Spain) J.J. Casas	7	4	2
(Spain) A. Ayats / (Argentina) J.C. Belluati	5	6	6
(Spain) A. Marques / (Spain) A. Rodriguez	6	6	1
(Spain) G. Rubio / (Spain) P. Fernandez	7	2	6
(Spain) C. Alfaro / (Spain) P. Valverde	2	2
5	(Spain) A. Ruiz / (Argentina) J. Tello	6	6
6	(Spain) Coki / (Spain) J. Sanz	6	6
(Spain) J. Rico / (Spain) R. Mendez	3	2
(Spain) J. Bautista / (Spain) J. Muñoz	4	6	6
(Spain) A. Cepero / (Spain) M. Del Castillo	6	3	7
(Spain) M. Yanguas / (Spain) V. Ruiz	7	6
(Spain) F. Guerrero / (Spain) T. Zapata	6	4
(Spain) I. Ramírez / (Spain) P.G. Rodrigo	6	3
4	(Argentina) Chingotto / (Spain) Paquito	6	3	*
3	(Spain) Galán / (Spain) Lebrón	7	6
(Spain) A. Arroyo / (Spain) E. Alonso	6	1
(Spain) M. Quilez / (Spain) T. Bueno	7	6
(Spain) J.G. Mora / (Spain) J.G. Barahona	6	4
(Argentina) A. Chozas / (Argentina) L. Capra	7	6
(Spain) I. Vilariño / (Spain) S. Oria	6	4
(Spain) J. Esbri / (Brazil) L. Campagnolo	6	3	5
7	(Spain) J. Garrido / (Spain) Momo	4	6	7
8	(Argentina) A. Gutiérrez / (Argentina) Sanyo	2	6	4
(Spain) J. Rico / (Spain) M. Benitez	6	4	6
(Spain) G. Collado / (Argentina) M. Andornino	2	2
(Spain) J.M. Díaz / (Argentina) M. Lamperti	6	6
(Spain) J. Ruiz / (Spain) P. Cardona	6	6
(Argentina) L. Augsburger / (Argentina) V. Libaak	3	1
(Spain) J. Leal / (Spain) J.G. Diestro	2	3
2	(Argentina) F. Stupaczuk / (Argentina) Di Nenno	6	6

Round of 16
1	(Spain) Coello / (Argentina) Tapia	6	6
(Spain) A. Ayats / (Argentina) J.C. Belluati	3	1
(Spain) G. Rubio / (Spain) P. Fernandez	4	4
5	(Spain) A. Ruiz / (Argentina) J. Tello	6	6
6	(Spain) Coki / (Spain) J. Sanz	6	6
(Spain) A. Cepero / (Spain) M. Del Castillo	2	2
(Spain) M. Yanguas / (Spain) V. Ruiz	5	6
4	(Argentina) Chingotto / (Spain) Paquito	7	7
3	(Spain) Galán / (Spain) Lebrón	6	7
(Spain) M. Quilez / (Spain) T. Bueno	2	5
(Argentina) A. Chozas / (Argentina) L. Capra	7	4	0
7	(Spain) J. Garrido / (Spain) Momo	6	6	6
(Spain) J. Rico / (Spain) M. Benitez	6	0	6
(Spain) J.M. Díaz / (Argentina) M. Lamperti	4	6	4
(Spain) J. Ruiz / (Spain) P. Cardona	2	1
2	(Argentina) F. Stupaczuk / (Argentina) Di Nenno	6	6

Quarter-Final
1	(Spain) Coello / (Argentina) Tapia	6	4	6
5	(Spain) A. Ruiz / (Argentina) J. Tello	1	6	2
6	(Spain) Coki / (Spain) J. Sanz	6	6	3
4	(Argentina) Chingotto / (Spain) Paquito	7	4	6
3	(Spain) Galán / (Spain) Lebrón	6	6
7	(Spain) J. Garrido / (Spain) Momo	3	4
(Spain) J. Rico / (Spain) M. Benitez	1	0
2	(Argentina) F. Stupaczuk / (Argentina) Di Nenno	6	6

Semi-Finals
1	(Spain) Coello / (Argentina) Tapia	6	6
4	(Argentina) Chingotto / (Spain) Paquito	3	3
3	(Spain) Galán / (Spain) Lebrón	6	7
2	(Argentina) F. Stupaczuk / (Argentina) Di Nenno	1	5

Finals
1	(Spain) Coello / (Argentina) Tapia	3	2
3	(Spain) Galán / (Spain) Lebrón	6	6

=== Women's Bracket ===
Round of 32
1	(Spain) A. Sánchez / (Spain) P. Josemaria
Bye
(Spain) M. Caparros / (Spain) T. Navarro	7	5	7
(Spain) J. Velasco / (Spain) N. Canovas	5	7	5
(Spain) L. Sainz / (Spain) P. Llaguno	6	6
(Spain) A. Perez / (Spain) P. Martínez	3	3
(Spain) A. Alonso / (Spain) A. Ustero	4	5
5	(Spain) T. Icardo / (Argentina) V. Riera	6	7
6	(Argentina) A. Osoro / (Spain) J. Castelló	6	6
(Spain) L.R. Abajo / (Spain) S. Bellver	1	1
(Spain) A. Martinez / (Spain) S. Ruiz	3	4
(Spain) C. Goenaga / (Spain) L. Martínez	6	6
(Spain) E. Amatriaín / (France) L. Godallier	2	4
(Spain) M. Martínez / (Spain) S. Saiz	6	6
Bye
4	(Spain) A. Salazar / (Portugal) S. Araújo
3	(Spain) B. González / (Argentina) D. Brea
Bye
(Spain) N. Rodriguez / (Spain) M. Talaván	6	6
(Italy) C. Orsi / (Spain) C. Mesa	4	0
(France) A. Collombon / (Spain) L. Rufo	6	7
(Russia) K. Sharifova / (Spain) M. Borrero	4	6
(Spain) A. Rojo / (Spain) M. Rivas	1	0
7	(Argentina) C. Jensen / (Spain) V. Virseda	6	6
8	(Spain) Majo / (Spain) Mapi	6	6
(Spain) A.F. de Ossó / (Spain) M. Villalba	2	4
(Portugal) A. Nogueira / (Spain) B. Caldera	4	4
(Sweden) C. Navarro / (Spain) M. Guinart	6	6
(Spain) C. Fernandez / (Spain) V. Iglesias	6	6
(Spain) M. Barrera / (Spain) M. Merino	4	1
Bye
2	(Spain) G. Triay / (Spain) M. Ortega

Round of 16
1	(Spain) A. Sánchez / (Spain) P. Josemaria	6	6
(Spain) M. Caparro / (Spain) T. Navarro	1	1
(Spain) L. Sainz / (Spain) P. Llaguno	6	6
5	(Spain) T. Icardo / (Argentina) V. Riera	1	4
6	(Argentina) A. Osoro / (Spain) J. Castelló	6	6
(Spain) C. Goenaga / (Spain) L. Martínez	4	4
(Spain) M. Martínez / (Spain) S. Saiz	5	4
4	(Spain) A. Salazar / (Portugal) S. Araújo	7	6
3	(Spain) B. González / (Argentina) D. Brea	6	6
(Spain) N. Rodriguez / (Spain) M. Talaván	4	3
(France) A. Collombon / (Spain) L. Rufo	2	1
7	(Argentina) C. Jensen / (Spain) V. Virseda	6	6
8	(Spain) Majo / (Spain) Mapi	7	6
(Sweden) C. Navarro / (Spain) M. Guinart	5	4
(Spain) C. Fernandez / (Spain) V. Iglesias	3	5
2	(Spain) Gemma Triay / (Spain) Marta Ortega	6	7

Quarter-Final
1	(Spain) A. Sánchez / (Spain) P. Josemaria	6	3	*
5	(Spain) L. Sainz / (Spain) P. Llaguno	3	2
6	(Argentina) A. Osoro / (Spain) J. Castelló	6	5	7
4	(Spain) A. Salazar / (Portugal) S. Araújo	1	7	5
3	(Spain) B. González / (Argentina) D. Brea	6	7
7	(Argentina) C. Jensen / (Spain) V. Virseda	2	6
8	(Spain) Majo / (Spain) Mapi	0	1
2	(Spain) G. Triay / (Spain) M. Ortega	6	6

Semi-Finals
1	(Spain) A. Sánchez / (Spain) P. Josemaria	6	6
6	(Argentina) A. Osoro / (Spain) J. Castelló	2	0
2	(Spain) B. González / (Argentina) D. Brea	2	5
3	(Spain) G. Triay / (Spain) M. Ortega	6	7

Finals
1	(Spain) A. Sánchez / (Spain) P. Josemaria	4	6	4
2	(Spain) G. Triay / (Spain) M. Ortega	6	4	6

=== Round of 32 ===
Men's

Date	Winners	Score	Opponent	Refs.
25/10/2023	(Argentina) Agustín Tapia (Spain) Arturo Coello	6–3 / 6–7 / 6–4	(Spain) Francisco Gil (Argentina) Ramiro Moyano	
25/10/2023	(Spain) Arnau Ayats (Argentina) Juan Cruz Belluati	5–7 / 6–4 / 6–2	(Spain) Luis Hernandez Quesada (Spain) Jose Jimenez Casas	
25/10/2023	(Spain) Gonzalo Rubio (Spain) Pincho Fernandez	7–6 / 2–6 / 6–1	(Spain) Adrian Marques (Spain) Alonso Rodriguez	
25/10/2023	(Spain) Alex Ruiz (Argentina) Juan Tello	6–2 / 6–2	(Spain) Candido Jorge Alfaro (Spain) Pablo Castillo Valverde	
25/10/2023	(Spain) Coki Nieto (Spain) Jon Sanz	6–3 / 6–2	(Spain) Javi Rico (Spain) Rafael Mendez	
25/10/2023	(Spain) Alvaro Cepero (Spain) Mario Del Castillo	6–4 / 3–6 / 7–6	(Spain) Jairo Bautista (Spain) Jaime Muñoz	
25/10/2023	(Spain) Miguel Yanguas (Spain) Victor Ruiz	7–6 / 6–4	(Spain) Francisco Guerrero (Spain) Teodoro Zapata	
25/10/2023	(Argentina) Federico Chingotto (Spain) Paquito Navarro	6–3 / 3–0 / W.O.	(Spain) Iván Ramírez (Spain) Pablo García Rodrigo	
25/10/2023	(Spain) Alejandro Galán (Spain) Juan Lebrón	7–6 / 6–1	(Spain) Alejandro Arroyo (Spain) Eduardo Alonso	
25/10/2023	(Spain) Marc Quilez (Spain) Toni Bueno	7–6 / 6–4	(Spain) Javier García Mora (Spain) Javier Gonzalez Barahona	
25/10/2023	(Argentina) Alex Chozas (Argentina) Lucho Capra	7–6 / 6–4	(Spain) Ignacio Vilariño (Spain) Salvador Oria	
25/10/2023	(Spain) Javi Garrido (Spain) Momo González	4–6 / 6–3 / 7–5	(Spain) Juanlu Esbri (Brazil) Lucas Campagnolo	
25/10/2023	(Spain) Jose Rico (Spain) Miguel Benitez	6–2 / 4–6 / 6–4	(Argentina) Agustín Gutiérrez (Argentina) Sanyo Gutiérrez	
25/10/2023	(Spain) Juan Martín Díaz (Argentina) Miguel Lamperti	6–2 / 6–2	(Spain) Guillermo Collado (Argentina) Martin Andornino	
25/10/2023	(Spain) Javier Ruiz (Spain) Pablo Cardona	6–3 / 6–1	(Argentina) Leo Augsburger (Argentina) Valentino Libaak	
25/10/2023	(Argentina) Franco Stupaczuk (Argentina) Martin Di Nenno	6–2 / 6–3	(Spain) Javier Leal (Spain) José García Diestro	

Women's

Date	Winners	Score	Opponent	Refs.
25/10/2023	(Spain) Marta Caparros (Spain) Teresa Navarro	7–5 / 5–7 / 7–5	(Spain) Jimena Velasco (Spain) Noa Canovas	
25/10/2023	(Spain) Lucía Sainz (Spain) Patty Llaguno	6–3 / 6–3	(Spain) Agueda Perez (Spain) Patricia Martínez	
25/10/2023	(Spain) Tamara Icardo (Argentina) Virginia Riera	6–4 / 7–5	(Spain) Alejandra Alonso (Spain) Andrea Ustero	
25/10/2023	(Argentina) Aranza Osoro (Spain) Jessica Castelló	6–1 / 6–1	(Spain) Laia Rodriguez Abajo (Spain) Sandra Bellver	
25/10/2023	(Spain) Carmen Goenaga (Spain) Lucía Martínez	6–3 / 6–4	(Spain) Araceli Martinez (Spain) Sara Ruiz Soto	
25/10/2023	(Spain) Marina Martínez (Spain) Sofía Saiz	6–2 / 6–4	(Spain) Eli Amatriaín (France) Lea Godallier	
25/10/2023	(Spain) Nuria Rodriguez (Spain) Marta Talaván	6–4 / 6–0	(Italy) Carolina Orsi (Spain) Carla Mesa	
25/10/2023	(France) Alix Collombon (Spain) Lorena Rufo	6–4 / 7–6	(Russia) Ksenia Sharifova (Spain) Marta Borrero	
25/10/2023	(Argentina) Claudia Jensen (Spain) Verónica Virseda	6–1 / 6–0	(Spain) Alicia Blanco Rojo (Spain) Monica Gomez Rivas	
25/10/2023	(Spain) Majo Sánchez Alayeto (Spain) Mapi Sánchez Alayeto	6–2 / 6–4	(Spain) Ana Fernandez de Ossó (Spain) Mari Carmen Villalba	
25/10/2023	(Sweden) Carolina Navarro (Spain) Marina Guinart	6–4 / 6–4	(Portugal) Ana Catarina Nogueira (Spain) Beatriz Caldera	
25/10/2023	(Spain) Claudia Fernandez (Spain) Victoria Iglesias	6–4 / 6–1	(Spain) Marta Barrera (Spain) Melania Merino	

=== Round of 16 ===
Men's

Date	Team A	Score	Team B	Refs.
26/10/2023	(Argentina) Agustín Tapia (Spain) Arturo Coello	6–3 / 6–1	(Spain) Arnau Ayats (Argentina) Juan Cruz Belluati	
26/10/2023	(Spain) Alex Ruiz (Argentina) Juan Tello	6–4 / 6–4	(Spain) Gonzalo Rubio (Spain) Pincho Fernandez	
26/10/2023	(Spain) Coki Nieto (Spain) Jon Sanz	6–2 / 6–2	(Spain) Alvaro Cepero (Spain) Mario Del Castillo	
26/10/2023	(Argentina) Federico Chingotto (Spain) Paquito Navarro	7–5 / 7–6	(Spain) Miguel Yanguas (Spain) Victor Ruiz	
26/10/2023	(Spain) Alejandro Galán (Spain) Juan Lebrón	6–2 / 7–5	(Spain) Marc Quilez (Spain) Toni Bueno	
26/10/2023	(Spain) Javi Garrido (Spain) Momo González	6–7 / 6–4 / 6–0	(Argentina) Alex Chozas (Argentina) Lucho Capra	
26/10/2023	(Spain) Jose Rico (Spain) Miguel Benitez	6–4 / 0–6 / 6–4	(Spain) Juan Martín Díaz (Argentina) Miguel Lamperti	
26/10/2023	(Argentina) Franco Stupaczuk (Argentina) Martin Di Nenno	6–2 / 6–1	(Spain) Javier Ruiz (Spain) Pablo Cardona	

Women's

Date	Team A	Score	Team B	Refs.
26/10/2023	(Spain) Ariana Sánchez (Spain) Paula Josemaria	6–1 / 6–1	(Spain) Marta Caparros (Spain) Teresa Navarro	
26/10/2023	(Spain) Lucía Sainz (Spain) Patty Llaguno	6–1 / 6–4	(Spain) Tamara Icardo (Argentina) Virginia Riera	
26/10/2023	(Argentina) Aranza Osoro (Spain) Jessica Castelló	6–4 / 6–4	(Spain) Carmen Goenaga (Spain) Lucía Martínez	
26/10/2023	(Spain) Alejandra Salazar (Portugal) Sofia Araújo	7–5 / 6–4	(Spain) Marina Martínez (Spain) Sofía Saiz	
26/10/2023	(Spain) Bea González (Argentina) Delfina Brea	6–4 / 6–3	(Spain) Nuria Rodriguez (Spain) Marta Talaván	
26/10/2023	(Argentina) Claudia Jensen (Spain) Verónica Virseda	6–2 / 6–1	(France) Alix Collombon (Spain) Lorena Rufo	
26/10/2023	(Spain) Majo Sánchez Alayeto (Spain) Mapi Sánchez Alayeto	7–5 / 6–4	(Sweden) Carolina Navarro (Spain) Marina Guinart	
26/10/2023	(Spain) Gemma Triay (Spain) Marta Ortega	6–3 / 7–5	(Spain) Claudia Fernandez (Spain) Victoria Iglesias	

=== Quarter-Finals ===
Men's

Date	Team A	Score	Team B	Refs.
27/10/2023	(Argentina) Agustín Tapia (Spain) Arturo Coello	6–1 / 4–6 / 6–2	(Spain) Alex Ruiz (Argentina) Juan Tello	
27/10/2023	(Argentina) Federico Chingotto (Spain) Paquito Navarro	7–6 / 4–6 / 6–3	(Spain) Coki Nieto (Spain) Jon Sanz	
27/10/2023	(Spain) Alejandro Galán (Spain) Juan Lebrón	6–3 / 6–4	(Spain) Javi Garrido (Spain) Momo González	
27/10/2023	(Argentina) Franco Stupaczuk (Argentina) Martin Di Nenno	6–1 / 6–0	(Spain) Jose Rico (Spain) Miguel Benitez	

Women's

Date	Team A	Score	Team B	Refs.
27/10/2023	(Spain) Ariana Sánchez (Spain) Paula Josemaria	6–3 / 3–2 / W.O.	(Spain) Lucía Sainz (Spain) Patty Llaguno	
27/10/2023	(Argentina) Aranza Osoro (Spain) Jessica Castelló	6–1 / 5–7 / 7–5	(Spain) Alejandra Salazar (Portugal) Sofia Araújo	
27/10/2023	(Spain) Bea González (Argentina) Delfina Brea	6–2 / 7–6	(Argentina) Claudia Jensen (Spain) Verónica Virseda	
27/10/2023	(Spain) Gemma Triay (Spain) Marta Ortega	6–0 / 6–1	(Spain) Majo Sánchez Alayeto (Spain) Mapi Sánchez Alayeto	

=== Semi-Finals ===
Men's

Date	Team A	Score	Team B	Refs.
28/10/2023	(Argentina) Agustín Tapia (Spain) Arturo Coello	6–3 / 6–3	(Argentina) Federico Chingotto (Spain) Paquito Navarro	
28/10/2023	(Spain) Alejandro Galán (Spain) Juan Lebrón	6–1 / 7–5	(Argentina) Franco Stupaczuk (Argentina) Martin Di Nenno	

Women's

Date	Team A	Score	Team B	Refs.
28/10/2023	(Spain) Ariana Sánchez (Spain) Paula Josemaria	6–2 / 6–0	(Argentina) Aranza Osoro (Spain) Jessica Castelló	
28/10/2023	(Spain) Gemma Triay (Spain) Marta Ortega	6–2 / 7–5	(Spain) Bea González (Argentina) Delfina Brea	

=== Finals ===
Men's

Date	Team A	Score	Team B	Refs.
29/10/2023	(Spain) Alejandro Galán (Spain) Juan Lebrón	6–3 / 6–2	(Argentina) Agustín Tapia (Spain) Arturo Coello	

Women's

Date	Team A	Score	Team B	Refs.
29/10/2023	(Spain) Gemma Triay (Spain) Marta Ortega	6–4 / 4–6 / 6–4	(Spain) Ariana Sánchez (Spain) Paula Josemaria	
