= 2023 Mendoza P1 =

Padel championships

- Date: 29 July – 6 August
- Edition: 2nd
- Category: P1
- Prize money: € 300,000
- Location: Argentia, Mendoza
- Venue: Aconcagua Arena

Champions
- Men's doubles: (Argentina) Agustín Tapia (Spain) Arturo Coello

Chronology
Previous
Málaga Open (WPT)
Next
Finland Open (WPT)

The 2023 Argentina P1 or 2023 Mendoza P1 was the fourth tournament of the second season organized by Premier Padel, promoted by the International Padel Federation, and with the financial backing of Nasser Al-Khelaïfi's Qatar Sports Investments.

In the men's final, Agustín Tapia and Arturo Coello, FIP number 3 ranked team, defeated Franco Stupaczuk and Martín Di Nenno, FIP number 2 ranked team, in the final, winning their second third as team in the circuit (their 13 overall between WPT and PP).

== Seeds ==
=== Men's ===
1. (Spain) Alejandro Galán / (Spain) Juan Lebrón (semi-final)
2. (Argentina) Franco Stupaczuk / (Argentina) Martin Di Nenno (semi-final)
3. (Argentina) Agustín Tapia / (Spain) Arturo Coello (winners)
4. (Argentina) Federico Chingotto / (Spain) Paquito Navarro (quarter-final)
5. (Argentina) Fernando Belasteguín / (Spain) Mike Yanguas (quarter-finals)
6. (Spain) Aléx Ruiz / (Argentina) Juan Tello (semi-final)
7. (Spain) Momo Gonzalez / (Argentina) Sanyo Gutiérrez (quarter-final)
8. (Argentina) Agustin Silingo / (Brazil) Pablo Lima (round of 16)

== Men's Draw ==
Round of 32
1	(Spain) Galán / (Spain) Lebrón	6	6
(Argentina) M. Blasco / (Argentina) S. Rolla	0	2
(Italy) F. Dominguez / (Spain) M. Quilez	3	4
9	(Argentina) L. Capra / (Argentina) Maxi	6	6
12	(Spain) F. Gil / (Argentina) R. Moyano	6	6
(Spain) P. Cardona / (Spain) P. Fernandéz	4	7	*
(Spain) J. Bautista / (Spain) J.M. Diaz	3	4
7	(Spain) Momo / (Argentina) Sanyo	6	6
5	(Argentina) Belasteguín / (Spain) Yanguas	6	6
(Spain) F. Sotillo / (France) T. Leygue	1	3
(Argentina) G. Alfonso / (Argentina) J. Pascual	4	7	6
14	(Argentina) J.C. Belluati / (Spain) J. Ruiz	6	5	7
13	(Spain) A. Arroyo / (Spain) G. Rubio	1	6	6
(Argentina) F. Lopez / (Argentina) J. Rubini	6	3	3
(Argentina) A. Chozas / (Spain) A. Cepero	3	6
3	(Spain) Coello / (Argentina) Tapia	6	7
3	(Argentina) Chingotto / (Spain) Paquito	6	6
(Argentina) C.G. Gutiérrez / (Spain) M. Huete	2	2
(Chile) J. Valdes / (Spain) J. Sanchez	6	6
16	(Spain) I. Ramirez / (Spain) J. Munoz	4	3
10	(Brazil) L. Bergamini / (Spain) V. Ruiz	6	6
(Spain) E. Alonso / (Spain) J. Esbri	3	3
(Argentina) F. Mouriño / (Argentina) I. Piotto	4	4
6	(Spain) A. Ruiz / (Argentina) Tello	6	6
8	(Argentina) A. Silingo / (Brazil) Lima	7	7
(Spain) A. Mercadal / (Spain) R. Rivera	6	6
(Spain) A. Sans / (Spain) T. Zapata	4	6
15	(Argentina) A. Gutierrez / (Spain) J. Rico	6	7
11	(Spain) Coki / (Spain) J. Sanz	6	6
(Italy) N. Suescun / (Spain) S. Alba	2	0
(Argentina) F. Britos / (Argentina) M. Rivero	1	1
2	(Argentina) F. Stupaczuk / (Argentina) Di Nenno	6	6

Round of 16
1	(Spain) Galán / (Spain) Lebrón	6	6
9	(Argentina) L. Capra / (Argentina) Maxi	0	2
(Spain) P. Cardona / (Spain) P. Fernandéz	3	0
7	(Spain) Momo / (Argentina) Sanyo	6	6
5	(Argentina) Belasteguín / (Spain) Yanguas	6	6
14	(Argentina) J.C. Belluati / (Spain) J. Ruiz	4	1
13	(Spain) A. Arroyo / (Spain) G. Rubio	1	3
3	(Spain) Coello / (Argentina) Tapia	6	6
3	(Argentina) Chingotto / (Spain) Paquito	6	6
(Chile) J. Valdes / (Spain) J. Sanchez	1	3
10	(Brazil) L. Bergamini / (Spain) V. Ruiz	3	2
6	(Spain) A. Ruiz / (Argentina) Tello	6	6
8	(Argentina) A. Silingo / (Brazil) Lima	1	3
15	(Argentina) A. Gutierrez / (Spain) J. Rico	6	6
11	(Spain) Coki / (Spain) J. Sanz	1	7	6
2	(Argentina) F. Stupaczuk / (Argentina) Di Nenno	6	6	7

Quarterfinals
1	(Spain) Galán / (Spain) Lebrón	6	6
7	(Spain) Momo/ (Argentina) Sanyo	3	1
5	(Argentina) Belasteguín/ (Spain) Yanguas	1	2
3	(Spain) Coello / (Argentina) Tapia	6	6
4	(Argentina) Chingotto / (Spain) Paquito	4	5
6	(Spain) A. Ruiz / (Argentina) Tello	6	7
15	(Argentina) A. Gutiérrez / (Spain) J. Rico	2	2
2	(Argentina) F. Stupaczuk / (Argentina) Di Nenno	6	6

Semifinals
1	(Spain) Galán / (Spain) Lebrón	4	2
3	(Spain) Coello / (Argentina) Tapia	6	6
6	(Spain) A. Ruiz / (Argentina) Tello	6	6	1
2	(Argentina) F. Stupaczuk / (Argentina) Di Nenno	4	7	6

Final
3	(Spain) Coello / (Argentina) Tapia	6	7
2	(Argentina) F. Stupaczuk / (Argentina) Di Nenno	2	6

== Results ==
=== First Round ===
Date	Winners	Score	Opponent	Refs.
1/8/2023	(Argentina) Maxi Sánchez Blasco (Argentina) Santiago Rolla	6–0 / 4–6 / 6–3	(Italy) Juan Manuel Restivo (Italy) Martin Andornino	
31/7/2023	(Italy) Facundo Dominguez (Spain) Marc Quilez	6–7 / 7–6 / 6–3	(Spain) Alvaro Montiel Caruso (Spain) Marcos Cordoba Lugo	
1/8/2023	(Spain) Pablo Cardona (Spain) Pincho Fernandéz	6–4 / 6–4	(Italy) Aris Patiniotis (Spain) Emilio Sanchez Chamero	
1/8/2023	(Spain) Jairo Bautista (Spain) Juan Martín Díaz Martínez	7–6 / 7–5	(France) Benjamin Tison (Spain) Victor Mena Gil	
31/7/2023	(Spain) Ferran Insa Sotillo (France) Thomas Leygue	6–1 / 6–4	(Spain) Diego Gil (Spain) Ignacio Sager	
1/8/2023	(Argentina) Gonzalo Alfonso (Argentina) Juan Pascual	7–5 / 6–1	(Italy) Denis Perino (Argentina) Miguel Lamperti	
31/7/2023	(Argentina) Facundo Lopez (Argentina) Juan Ignacio Rubini	7–6 / 6–4	(Italy) Emiliano iriart (Spain) Carlos Perez Cabeza	
31/7/2023	(Argentina) Alex Chozas (Spain) Alvaro Cepero	6–4 / 3–6 / 6–1	(France) Jeremy Scatena (Spain) Toni Bueno	
1/8/2023	(Argentina) Cristian German Gutiérrez (Spain) Mario Huete	6–4 / 3–6 / 7–6	(France) Bastien Blanque (France) Dylan Guichard	
1/8/2023	(Chile) Javier Valdes (Spain) Jose David Sanchez Serrano	6–3 / 6–1	(Argentina) Felipe Calleja (Argentina) Ivo Andenmatten	
1/8/2023	(Spain) Eduardo Alonso (Spain) Juanlu Esbri	6–3 / 7–5	(Argentina) Matías Del Moral (Argentina) Santiago Frugoni	
1/8/2023	(Argentina) Federico Mouriño (Argentina) Ignacio Piotto	6–1 / 7–5	(Spain) Aitor Garcia Bassas (Spain) Ricardo Martinez Sanchez	
31/7/2023	(Spain) Adriá Mercadal (Spain) Ruben Rivera	6–3 / 6–2	(Italy) Julián Di Bene (Italy) Mauro Salandro	
31/7/2023	(Spain) Anton Sans (Spain) Teodoro Zapata	6–1 / 4–6 / 6–3	(Spain) Jaime Fermosell (Spain) Raúl Marcos Durán	
31/7/2023	(Italy) Nicolás Suescun (Spain) Sergio Alba	6–4 / 1–6 / 6–2	(Argentina) Luciano Puppo (Argentina) Matías González	
31/7/2023	(Argentina) Francisco Britos (Argentina) Mauricio Rivero	6–2 / 4–6 / 6–2	(Spain) Gaspar Campos (Spain) J.M. Mouliaa Lopez	

=== Round of 32 ===
Date	Winners	Score	Opponent	Refs.
2/8/2023	(Spain) Alejandro Galán (Spain) Juan Lebrón	6–0 / 6–2	(Argentina) Maxi Sánchez Blasco (Argentina) Santiago Rolla	
2/8/2023	(Argentina) Lucho Capra (Argentina) Maxi Sánchez	6–3 / 6–4	(Italy) Facundo Dominguez (Spain) Marc Quilez	
2/8/2023	(Spain) Pablo Cardona (Spain) Pincho Fernandéz	4–6 / 7–6 / W.O.	(Spain) Francisco Gil Morales (Argentina) Ramiro Moyano	
2/8/2023	(Spain) Momo Gonzalez (Argentina) Sanyo Gutierrez	6–3 / 6–4	(Spain) Jairo Bautista (Spain) Juan Martín Díaz Martínez	
2/8/2023	(Argentina) Fernando Belasteguín (Spain) Miguel Yanguas	6–1 / 6–3	(Spain) Ferran Insa Sotillo (France) Thomas Leygue	
2/8/2023	(Spain) Javi Ruiz (Argentina) Juan Cruz Belluati	6–4 / 5–7 / 7–6	(Argentina) Gonzalo Alfonso (Argentina) Juan Pascual	
2/8/2023	(Spain) Alejandro Arroyo (Spain) Gonzalo Rubio	1–6 / 6–3 / 6–3	(Argentina) Facundo Lopez (Argentina) Juan Ignacio Rubini	
2/8/2023	(Argentina) Agustín Tapia (Spain) Arturo Coello	6–3 / 7–6	(Argentina) Alex Chozas (Spain) Alvaro Cepero	
2/8/2023	(Argentina) Federico Chingotto (Spain) Paquito Navarro	6–2 / 6–2	(Argentina) Cristian German Gutiérrez (Spain) Mario Huete	
2/8/2023	(Chile) Javier Valdes (Spain) Jose David Sanchez Serrano	6–4 / 6–3	(Spain) Ivan Ramirez (Spain) Jaime Muñoz	
2/8/2023	(Brazil) Lucas Bergamini (Spain) Víctor Ruiz	6–3 / 6–3	(Spain) Eduardo Alonso (Spain) Juanlu Esbri	
2/8/2023	(Spain) Alex Ruiz (Spain) Juan Tello	6–4 / 6–4	(Argentina) Federico Mouriño (Argentina) Ignacio Piotto	
2/8/2023	(Argentina) Agustin Gomez Silingo (Brazil) Pablo Lima	7–6 / 7–6	(Spain) Adriá Mercadal (Spain) Ruben Rivera	
2/8/2023	(Argentina) Agustín Gutiérrez (Spain) José Rico	6–4 / 7–6	(Spain) Anton Sans (Spain) Teodoro Zapata	
2/8/2023	(Spain) Coki Nieto (Spain) Jon Sanz	6–2 / 6–0	(Italy) Nicolás Suescun (Spain) Sergio Alba	
2/8/2023	(Argentina) Franco Stupaczuk (Argentina) Martin Di Nenno	6–1 / 6–1	(Argentina) Francisco Britos (Argentina) Mauricio Rivero	

=== Round of 16 ===
Date	Winners	Score	Opponent	Refs.
3/8/2023	(Spain) Alejandro Galán (Spain) Juan Lebrón	6–0 / 6–2	(Argentina) Lucho Capra (Argentina) Maxi Sánchez	
3/8/2023	(Spain) Momo Gonzalez (Argentina) Sanyo Gutierrez	6–3 / 6–0	(Spain) Pablo Cardona (Spain) Pincho Fernandéz	
3/8/2023	(Argentina) Fernando Belasteguín (Spain) Miguel Yanguas	6–4 / 6–1	(Spain) Javi Ruiz (Argentina) Juan Cruz Belluati	
3/8/2023	(Argentina) Agustín Tapia (Spain) Arturo Coello	6–1 / 6–3	(Spain) Alejandro Arroyo (Spain) Gonzalo Rubio	
3/8/2023	(Argentina) Federico Chingotto (Spain) Paquito Navarro	6–1 / 6–3	(Chile) Javier Valdes (Spain) Jose David Sanchez Serrano	
3/8/2023	(Spain) Alex Ruiz (Spain) Juan Tello	6–3 / 6–2	(Brazil) Lucas Bergamini (Spain) Víctor Ruiz	
3/8/2023	(Argentina) Agustín Gutiérrez (Spain) José Rico	6–1 / 6–3	(Argentina) Agustin Gomez Silingo (Brazil) Pablo Lima	
3/8/2023	(Argentina) Franco Stupaczuk (Argentina) Martin Di Nenno	6–1 / 6–7 / 7–6	(Spain) Coki Nieto (Spain) Jon Sanz	

=== Quarter-Finals ===
Date	Winners	Score	Opponent	Refs.
4/8/2023	(Spain) Alejandro Galán (Spain) Juan Lebrón	6–3 / 6–1	(Spain) Momo Gonzalez (Argentina) Sanyo Gutierrez	
4/8/2023	(Argentina) Agustín Tapia (Spain) Arturo Coello	6–1 / 6–2	(Argentina) Fernando Belasteguín (Spain) Miguel Yanguas	
4/8/2023	(Spain) Alex Ruiz (Spain) Juan Tello	6–4 / 7–5	(Argentina) Federico Chingotto (Spain) Paquito Navarro	
4/8/2023	(Argentina) Franco Stupaczuk (Argentina) Martin Di Nenno	6–2 / 6–2	(Argentina) Agustín Gutiérrez (Spain) José Rico	

=== Semi-Finals ===
Date	Winners	Score	Opponent	Refs.
5/8/2023	(Argentina) Agustín Tapia (Spain) Arturo Coello	6–4 / 6–2	(Spain) Alejandro Galán (Spain) Juan Lebrón	
5/8/2023	(Argentina) Franco Stupaczuk (Argentina) Martin Di Nenno	4–6 / 7–6 / 6–1	(Spain) Alex Ruiz (Spain) Juan Tello	

=== Finals ===
Date	Winners	Score	Opponent	Refs.
6/8/2023	(Argentina) Agustín Tapia (Spain) Arturo Coello	6–2 / 7–6	(Argentina) Franco Stupaczuk (Argentina) Martin Di Nenno	

== Points distribution ==
Below is a series of tables showing the ranking points and money a player can earn.

Event	First round	Second Round	Round of 16	QF	SF	F	W
Points	18	45	90	180	300	600	1000
