= 2023 Vigo Open =

Padel championships

- Date: 9 – 14 May
- Edition: 4th
- Category: Open 1000
- Location: Vigo, Spain
- Venue: IFEVI

Champions
- Men's doubles: (Argentina) Agustín Tapia (Spain) Arturo Coello
- Women's doubles: (Spain) Ariana Sánchez (Spain) Paula Josemaría

Chronology

The WPT Vigo Open 2023 (officially WPT Estrella Damm Vigo Open 1000 2023) was the seventh tournament of the eleventh edition of World Padel Tour. The final phase was played between May 9 and 14, 2023 at the facilities of the Vigo Trade Fair Institute (IFEVI), while the preliminary phase was played between March 6 and 9.

In the women's category, Ariana Sánchez and Paula Josemaría won their fourth consecutive tournament, again against Gemma Triay and Alejandra Salazar, by 6–2 and 6–3.

In the men's category, Agustín Tapia and Arturo Coello defeated the former world number ones, Alejandro Galán and Juan Lebrón, in the final. Galán and Lebrón were making their return after more than a month's absence due to injury. After almost three hours of play and several match points lost, the number two seeds, Arturo Coello and Agustín Tapia, won the third-set tiebreak to secure their seventh consecutive title, 6–3, 6–7, 7–6, and become the new world number one pair.

== Relevant data ==
=== The men's number '1' is at stake ===
Since becoming number one in the 2020, Alejandro Galán and Juan Lebrón have only risked losing that status once: at the 2021 Master Final (which they ultimately won).

Three years later, still number one, they arrived at this tournament with the possibility of losing that position, this time to Arturo Coello and Agustín Tapia, who had a perfect start to the year. With 15,250 and 15,045 points each, very close to the Spanish duo's 15,415, a victory would crown them the as the new world number ones. And indeed, both pairs reached the final to compete head-to-head for the number 1 ranking, which Tapia and Coello ended up winning after a memorable three-set match.

After the tournament, Tapia remained as number 1 in the ranking alone with 16,250 points, second Coello with 16,045 and Galán and Lebrón at third with 16,015.

== Registered teams ==
Male

Rnk.	Team	WPT Ranking Points
1	(Spain) Alejandro Galán (Spain) Juan Lebrón	32.830
2	(Argentina) Agustín Tapia (Spain) Arturo Coello	30.995
3	(Argentina) Franco Stupaczuk (Argentina) Martín Di Nenno	19.105
4	(Spain) Momo González (Argentina) Sanyo Gutiérrez	16.090
5	(Argentina) Federico Chingotto (Spain) Paquito Navarro	14.110
6	(Spain) Alex Ruiz (Argentina) Juan Tello	13.155
7	(Argentina) Fernando Belasteguín (Spain) Miguel Yanguas	12.494
8	(Spain) Coki Nieto (Brazil) Pablo Lima	10.778
9	(Brazil) Lucas Campagnolo (Argentina) Maxi Sánchez	7.328
10	(Spain) Javi Garrido (Spain) Jon Sanz	6.761
11	(Spain) Alejandro Arroyo (Argentina) Lucho Capra	6.704
12	(Spain) José García Diestro (Spain) Pincho Fernández	6.336
13	(Spain) Gonzalo Rubio (Spain) Javier Ruiz	5.675
14	(Spain) Francisco Gil (Argentina) Ramiro Moyano	4.796
15	(Brazil) Lucas Bergamini (Spain) Víctor Ruiz	3.955
16	(Argentina) Miguel Lamperti (Argentina) Valentino Libaak	3.932
17	(Spain) Javier Leal (Argentina) Juan Cruz Belluati	3.775
18	(Spain) Eduardo Alonso (Spain) Juanlu Esbri	3.545
19	(Spain) Javier García Mora (Spain) Javier González Barahona	3.479
20	(Spain) Iván Ramírez (Spain) Pablo Cardona	3.174
21	(Spain) Javier Rico (Argentina) Leo Augsburger	3.020
22	(Argentina) Agustín Gomez Silingo (Argentina) Juan Martín Díaz	3.018
23	(Spain) Marc Quílez (Spain) Toni Bueno	2.980
24	(Spain) Ignacio Vilariño (Spain) Jaime Muñoz	2.783
25	(Spain) Josete Rico (Spain) Salvador Oria	2.715
26	(Spain) Antón Sans (Spain) Teodoro Zapata	2.684
27	(Spain) Mario del Castillo (Spain) Miguel Benítez	2.561
28	(Spain) Javier Martínez (Spain) Rafael Méndez	1.925
Qualified from the preliminary rounds
A	(Italy) Facundo Domínguez (Italy) Denis T. Perino	1.125
B	(Spain) Jaime Fermosell (Spain) Pablo García	1.413
C	(Spain) Diego Gil Batista (Spain) Ignacio Sager	642
D	(Spain) Enrique Goenaga (Spain) Jairo Bautista	1.696

Female

Rnk.	Team	WPT Ranking Points
1	(Spain) Ariana Sánchez (Spain) Paula Josemaría	38.070
2	(Spain) Alejandra Salazar (Spain) Gemma Triay	37.260
3	(Spain) Bea González (Argentina) Delfina Brea	13.660
4	(Spain) Marta Ortega (Portugal) Sofia Araújo	13.003
5	(Argentina) Aranza Osoro (Spain) Lucía Sainz	11.812
6	(Spain) Tamara Icardo (Argentina) Virginia Riera	10.949
7	(Argentina) Claudia Jensen (Spain) Jessica Castelló	8.969
8	(Spain) Majo Sánchez Alayeto (Spain) Mapi Sánchez Alayeto	8.779
9	(Spain) Beatriz Caldera (Spain) Verónica Virseda	6.728
10	(Spain) Lorena Rufo (Spain) Marta Talaván	5.082
11	(Spain) Carla Mesa (Spain) Esther Carnicero	4.552
12	(Spain) Nuria Rodríguez (Spain) Mª Carmen Villalba	3.729
13	(Spain) Alejandra Alonso (France) Alix Collombon	3.680
14	(Spain) Carmen Goenaga (Spain) Marta Caparrós	3.621
15	(Sweden) Carolina Navarro (Spain) Marina Guinart	3.595
16	(Spain) Claudia Fernández (Argentina) Julieta Bidahorria	3.536
17	(Spain) Lucía Martínez (Spain) Marta Barrera	3.502
18	(Spain) Eli Amatriaín (Spain) Sofía Saiz	2.951
19	(Portugal) Ana Catarina Nogueira (Spain) Melania Merino	2.915
20	(Spain) Araceli Martínez (Spain) Noa Cánovas	2.822
21	(Spain) Marina Martínez (Spain) Teresa Navarro	2.806
22	(Italy) Carolina Orsi (France) Léa Godallier	2.772
23	(Spain) Arantxa Soriano (Spain) Sandra Bellver	2.452
24	(Spain) Águeda Pérez (Spain) Sara Ruiz	2.333
Qualified from the preliminary rounds
A	(Spain) Letizia Manquillo (Portugal) Patrícia Ribeiro	862
B	(Italy) Emily Stellato (Italy) Giulia Sussarello	2.090
C	(Italy) Chiara Pappacena (Italy) Giorgia Marchetti	1.075
D	(Spain) Carmen Castillón (Spain) Nuria Vivancos	1.009

Men's teams missing

Rnk.	Team	WPT Ranking Points	
	(Argentina) Agustín Gutiérrez (Spain) Josete Rico		(Note: Josete Rico was injured at the Alicante Open 500 the previous week.)

Women's teams missing

Rnk.	Team	WPT Ranking Points	
6	(Spain) Patty Llaguno (Spain) Victoria Iglesias	11.308	(Note: Victoria Iglesias was injured at the Alicante Open 500 the previous week.)

== Schedule ==
The matches begin on Saturday with the qualifying rounds:

- Saturday, May 6: Men's qualifying rounds 1 and 2.
- Sunday, May 7: Men's qualifying round 3.
- Monday, May 8: Men's qualifying round 2 and women's qualifying rounds 1 and 2.

The main draw was played immediately afterward:

- Tuesday 9th: Round of 32 and final round of women's qualifying.
- Wednesday 10th: Round of 32.
- Thursday 11th: Round of 16.
- Friday 12th: Quarterfinals.
- Saturday 13th: Semifinals.
- Sunday 14th: Finals.

== Results ==
=== Men's Bracket ===
Round of 32
1	(Spain) Galán / (Spain) Lebrón	6	5	6
17	(Spain) J. Leal / (Argentina) J.C. Belluati	2	7	2
11	(Spain) Arroyo / (Argentina) Capra	4	6
20	(Spain) I. Ramírez / (Spain) Cardona	6	7
10	(Spain) Garrido / (Spain) Sanz	6	6
26	(Spain) Sans / (Spain) Zapata	3	2
28	(Spain) J. Martínez / (Spain) R. Méndez	0	6	3
8	(Spain) Coki / (Brazil) Lima	6	2	6
5	(Argentina) Chingotto / (Spain) Paquito
(Spain) F. Domínguez / (Spain) D. Perino (A)
9	(Brazil) Campagnolo / (Argentina) Sánchez	6	6
(Spain) E. Goenaga / (Spain) J. Bautista (D)	1	3
18	(Spain) E. Alonso / (Spain) J. Esbri	6	6
23	(Spain) M. Quílez / (Spain) T. Bueno	4	2
27	(Spain) del Castillo / (Spain) M. Benítez	2	5
4	(Spain) Momo / (Argentina) Sanyo	6	7
3	(Argentina) Stupaczuk / (Argentina) Di Nenno	6	6
21	(Spain) J. Rico / (Argentina) Augsburger	2	3
16	(Argentina) Lamperti / (Argentina) Libaak	6	6	6
19	(Spain) J. Mora / (Spain) J. Barahona	7	2	7
25	(Spain) J. Rico / (Spain) S. Oria	3	5
12	(Spain) J. Diestro / (Spain) P. Fernández	6	7
14	(Spain) F. Gil / (Argentina) R. Moyano	1	3
7	(Argentina) Belasteguín / (Spain) Yanguas	6	6
6	(Spain) A. Ruiz / (Argentina) J. Tello	4
13	(Spain) G. Rubio / (Spain) J. Ruiz	5	*
(Spain) J. Fermosell / (Spain) P. García (B)	6	2	6
24	(Spain) I. Vilariño / (Spain) J. Muñoz	4	6	4
(Spain) D. Batista / (Spain) I. Sager (C)	2	3
15	(Brazil) Bergamini / (Spain) V. Ruiz	6	6
22	(Argentina) Silingo / (Spain) J.M. Díaz	1	2
2	(Argentina) Tapia / (Spain) Coello	6	6

Round of 16
1	(Spain) Galán / (Spain) Lebrón	6	7
17	(Spain) I. Ramírez / (Spain) P. Cardona	1	6
10	(Spain) Garrido / (Spain) Sanz
8	(Spain) Coki / (Brazil) Lima
5	(Argentina) Chingotto / (Spain) Paquito	6	6	6
9	(Brazil) Campagnolo / (Argentina) Sánchez	3	7	4
18	(Spain) E. Alonso / (Spain) J. Esbri
4	(Spain) Momo / (Argentina) Sanyo
3	(Argentina) Stupaczuk / (Argentina) Di Nenno	6	6
19	(Spain) J.G. Mora / (Spain) J. Barahona	2	2
12	(Spain) J. Diestro / (Spain) P. Fernández	4	3
7	(Argentina) Belasteguín / (Spain) Yanguas	6	6
6	(Spain) A. Ruiz / (Argentina) Tello	7	6
(Spain) J. Fermosell / (Spain) P. García (B)	6	2
15	(Brazil) Bergamini / (Spain) V. Ruiz	6	1	2
2	(Argentina) Tapia / (Spain) Coello	4	6	6

Quarter-Final
1	(Spain) Galán / (Spain) Lebrón	6	6	7
10	(Spain) J. Garrido / (Spain) Sanz	0	7	6
5	(Argentina) Chingotto / (Spain) Paquito	6	6	6
4	(Spain) Momo / (Argentina) Sanyo	4	7	7
3	(Argentina) Stupaczuk / (Argentina) Di Nenno	7	6	6
7	(Argentina) Belasteguín / (Spain) Yanguas	5	7	3
6	(Spain) A. Ruiz / (Argentina) Tello	3	4
2	(Argentina) Tapia / (Spain) Coello	6	6

Semi-Finals
1	(Spain) Galán / (Spain) Lebrón	6	6
4	(Spain) Momo / (Argentina) Sanyo	4	4
3	(Argentina) Stupaczuk / (Argentina) Di Nenno	4	4
4	(Argentina) Tapia / (Spain) Coello	6	6

Finals
1	(Spain) Galán / (Spain) Lebrón	3	7	6
2	(Argentina) Tapia / (Spain) Coello	6	6	7

=== Women's Bracket ===
Round of 32
1	(Spain) A. Sánchez / (Spain) P. Josemaría
Bye
(Spain) C. Castillón / (Spain) N. Vivancos (D)	2	3
15	(Sweden) C. Navarro / (Spain) M. Guinart	6	6
14	(Spain) C. Goenaga / (Spain) M. Caparrós	7	4	7
9	(Spain) B. Caldera / (Spain) V. Virseda	5	6	6
20	(Spain) A. Martínez / (Spain) N. Cánovas	1	2
8	(Spain) Majo / (Spain) Mapi	6	6
6	(Spain) T. Icardo / (Argentina) V. Riera	6	6
11	(Spain) C. Mesa / (Spain) E. Carnicero	3	2
(Italy) C. Pappacena / (Italy) G. Marchetti (C)	4	6
21	(Spain) M. Martínez / (Spain) T. Navarro	6	7
23	(Spain) A. Soriano / (Spain) S. Bellver	4	6	2
12	(Spain) N. Rodríguez / (Spain) M. Villalba	6	4	6
Bye
4	(Spain) M. Ortega / (Portugal) S. Araújo
3	(Spain) B. González / (Argentina) D. Brea
Bye
(Italy) E. Stellato / (Italy) G. Sussarello (B)	1	2
10	(Spain) L. Rufo / (Spain) M. Talaván	6	6
24	(Spain) A. Pérez / (Spain) S. Ruiz	6	6
18	(Spain) E. Amatriaín / (Spain) S. Saiz	7	7
17	(Spain) L. Martínez / (Spain) M. Barrera	4	1
5	(Argentina) A. Osoro / (Spain) L. Sainz	6	6
7	(Argentina) C. Jensen / (Spain) J. Castelló	6	2	7
13	(Spain) A. Alonso / (France) A. Collombon	3	6	6
16	(Spain) C. Fernández / (Argentina) J. Bidahorria	6	6
19	(Portugal) A.C. Nogueira / (Spain) M. Merino	1	1
22	(Italy) C. Orsi / (France) L. Godallier	6	6
(Spain) L. Manquillo / (Portugal) P. Ribeiro (A)	1	2
Bye
2	(Spain) A. Salazar / (Spain) G. Triay

Round of 16
1	(Spain) A. Sánchez / (Spain) P. Josemaría	6	6
15	(Sweden) C. Navarro / (Spain) M. Guinart	0	2
14	(Spain) C. Goenaga / (Spain) M. Caparrós	1	4
8	(Spain) Majo / (Spain) Mapi	6	6
6	(Spain) T. Icardo / (Argentina) V. Riera	6	6
21	(Spain) M. Martínez / (Spain) T. Navarro	2	3
12	(Spain) M. Villalba / (Spain) N. Rodríguez	0	3
4	(Spain) M. Ortega / (Portugal) S. Araújo	6	6
3	(Spain) B. González / (Argentina) D. Brea	6	6
10	(Spain) L. Rufo / (Spain) M. Talaván	2	4
18	(Spain) E. Amatriaín / (Spain) S. Saiz	1	4
5	(Argentina) A. Osoro / (Spain) L. Sainz	6	6
7	(Argentina) C. Jensen / (Spain) J. Castelló	6	6
16	(Spain) C. Fernández / (Argentina) J. Bidahorria	2	2
22	(Italy) C. Orsi / (France) L. Godallier	2	4
2	(Spain) A. Salazar / (Spain) G. Triay	6	6

Quarter-Final
1	(Spain) A. Sánchez / (Spain) P. Josemaría	6	6
8	(Spain) Majo / (Spain) Mapi	2	3
6	(Spain) T. Icardo / (Argentina) Virginia Riera	3	3
4	(Spain) M. Ortega / (Portugal) S. Araújo	6	6
3	(Spain) B. González / (Argentina) D. Brea	6	6
5	(Argentina) A. Osoro / (Spain) L. Sainz	2	2
7	(Argentina) C. Jensen / (Spain) J. Castelló	6	0
2	(Spain) A. Salazar / (Spain) G. Triay	7	6

Semi-Finals
1	(Spain) A. Sánchez / (Spain) P. Josemaría	6	6
4	(Spain) M. Ortega / (Portugal) S. Araújo	4	1
3	(Spain) B. González / (Argentina) D. Brea	6	2	3
2	(Spain) A. Salazar / (Spain) G. Triay	4	6	6

Finals
1	(Spain) A. Sánchez / (Spain) P. Josemaría	6	6
2	(Spain) A. Salazar / (Spain) G. Triay	2	3

=== Final qualifying round ===
Men's

Data	Qualified	WPT Ranking Point	Opponents	Result
A	(Spain) Facundo Domínguez (Spain) Denis T. Perino	1.125 vs 1.388	(Spain) Alonso Rodríguez (Spain) José Solano	7–6 / 7–5
B	(Spain) Jaime Fermosell (Spain) Pablo García	1.413 vs 1.062	(Spain) Álvaro Meléndez (Spain) Pedro Meléndez	3–6 / 6–3 / 6–4
C	(Spain) Diego Gil Batista (Spain) Ignacio Sager	642 vs 823	(Spain) Íñigo Jofre (Spain) Luis Hernández	7–5 / 4–6 / 7–6
D	(Spain) Enrique Goenaga (Spain) Jairo Bautista	1.696 vs 1.007	(Spain) Daniel Santigosa (Spain) David Gala	7–5 / 7–6

Women's

Data	Qualified	WPT Ranking Point	Opponents	Result
A	(Spain) Letizia Manquillo (Portugal) Patrícia Ribeiro	862 vs 1.428	(Italy) Carlotta Casali (Spain) Marta Borrero	2–6 / 6–4 / 6–4
B	(Italy) Emily Stellato (Italy) Giulia Sussarello	2.090 vs 669	(Spain) Noemí Aguilar (Spain) Ariadna Cañellas	6–1 / 7–5
C	(Italy) Chiara Pappacena (Italy) Giorgia Marchetti	1.075 vs 1.489	(Spain) Lourdes Pascual (Spain) Raquel Segura	5–7 / 6–3 / 6–1
D	(Spain) Carmen Castillón (Spain) Nuria Vivancos	1.009 vs 1.600	(Spain) Martina Fassio (Spain) Sandra Hernández	6–4 / 7–6

=== Round of 32 ===
Men's

Date	Team A	Score	Team B	Refs.
9/5/2023	(Spain) Javier Martínez (Spain) Rafael Méndez	0–6 / 6–2 / 3–6	(Spain) Coki Nieto (Brazil) Pablo Lima	
9/5/2023	(Spain) Francisco Gil (Argentina) Ramiro Moyano	1–6 / 3–6	(Argentina) Fernando Belasteguín (Spain) Miguel Yanguas	
9/5/2023	(Spain) Mario del Castillo (Spain) Miguel Benítez	2–6 / 5–7	(Spain) Momo González (Argentina) Sanyo Gutiérrez	
9/5/2023	(Argentina) Miguel Lamperti (Argentina) Valentino Libaak	6–7 / 6–2 / 6–7	(Spain) Javier García Mora (Spain) Javier González Barahona	
9/5/2023	(Spain) Alejandro Galán (Spain) Juan Lebrón	6–2 / 5–7 / 6–2	(Spain) Javier Leal (Argentina) Juan Cruz Belluati	
9/5/2023	(Spain) Diego Gil Batista (Spain) Ignacio Sager	2–6 / 3–6	(Brazil) Lucas Bergamini (Spain) Víctor Ruiz	
9/5/2023	(Spain) Jaime Fermosell (Spain) Pablo García	6–4 / 2–6 / 6–4	(Spain) Ignacio Vilariño (Spain) Jaime Muñoz	
10/5/2023	(Spain) Eduardo Alonso (Spain) Juanlu Esbri	6–4 / 6–2	(Spain) Marc Quílez (Spain) Toni Bueno	
10/5/2023	(Brazil) Lucas Campagnolo (Argentina) Maxi Sánchez	6–1 / 6–3	(Spain) Enrique Goenaga (Spain) Jairo Bautista	
10/5/2023	(Argentina) Federico Chingotto (Spain) Paquito Navarro	6–2 / 6–1	(Spain) Facundo Domínguez (Spain) Denis T. Perino	
10/5/2023	(Spain) Alejandro Arroyo (Argentina) Lucho Capra	4–6 / 6–7	(Spain) Iván Ramírez (Spain) Pablo Cardona	
10/5/2023	(Spain) Javi Garrido (Spain) Jon Sanz	6–3 / 6–2	(Spain) Antón Sans (Spain) Teodoro Zapata	
10/5/2023	(Argentina) Franco Stupaczuk (Argentina) Martín Di Nenno	6–2 / 6–3	(Spain) Javier Rico (Argentina) Leo Augsburger	
10/5/2023	(Spain) Josete Rico (Spain) Salvador Oria	3–6 / 5–7	(Spain) José García Diestro (Spain) Pincho Fernández	
10/5/2023	(Argentina) Agustín Gomez Silingo (Argentina) Juan Martín Díaz	1–6 / 2–6	(Argentina) Agustín Tapia (Spain) Arturo Coello	
10/5/2023	(Spain) Alex Ruiz (Argentina) Juan Tello	5–4 (*inj.)	(Spain) Gonzalo Rubio (Spain) Javier Ruiz*	

Women's

Date	Team A	Score	Team B	Refs.
10/5/2023	(Spain) Lucía Martínez (Spain) Marta Barrera	4–6 / 1–6	(Argentina) Aranza Osoro (Spain) Lucía Sainz	
10/5/2023	(Spain) Águeda Pérez (Spain) Sara Ruiz	6–7 / 6–7	(Spain) Eli Amatriaín (Spain) Sofía Saiz	
10/5/2023	(Italy) Emily Stellato (Italy) Giulia Sussarello	1–6 / 2–6	(Spain) Lorena Rufo (Spain) Marta Talaván	
10/5/2023	(Spain) Claudia Fernández (Argentina) Julieta Bidahorria	6–1 / 6–1	(Portugal) Ana Catarina Nogueira (Spain) Melania Merino	
10/5/2023	(Argentina) Claudia Jensen (Spain) Jessica Castelló	6–3 / 2–6 / 7–6	(Spain) Alejandra Alonso (France) Alix Collombon	
10/5/2023	(Spain) Araceli Martínez (Spain) Noa Cánovas	1–6 / 2–6	(Spain) Majo Sánchez Alayeto (Spain) Mapi Sánchez Alayeto	
10/5/2023	(Italy) Carolina Orsi (France) Léa Godallier	6–1 / 6–2	(Spain) Letizia Manquillo (Portugal) Patrícia Ribeiro	
10/5/2023	(Spain) Arantxa Soriano (Spain) Sandra Bellver	4–6 / 6–4 / 2–6	(Spain) Nuria Rodríguez (Spain) Mª Carmen Villalba	
10/5/2023	(Spain) Tamara Icardo (Argentina) Virginia Riera	6–3 / 6–2	(Spain) Carla Mesa (Spain) Esther Carnicero	
10/5/2023	(Spain) Carmen Goenaga (Spain) Marta Caparrós	5–7 / 6–4 / 7–6	(Spain) Beatriz Caldera (Spain) Verónica Virseda	
10/5/2023	(Spain) Carmen Castillón (Spain) Nuria Vivancos	2–6 / 3–6	(Sweden) Carolina Navarro (Spain) Marina Guinart	
10/5/2023	(Italy) Chiara Pappacena (Italy) Giorgia Marchetti	4–6 / 6–7	(Spain) Marina Martínez (Spain) Teresa Navarro	

=== Round of 16 ===
Men's

Date	Team A	Score	Team B	Refs.
11/5/2023	(Spain) Eduardo Alonso (Spain) Juanlu Esbri	6–4 / 3–6 / 1–6	(Spain) Momo González (Argentina) Sanyo Gutiérrez	
11/5/2023	(Spain) Alejandro Galán (Spain) Juan Lebrón	6–1 / 7–6	(Spain) Iván Ramírez (Spain) Pablo Cardona	
11/5/2023	(Argentina) Federico Chingotto (Spain) Paquito Navarro	6–3 / 6–7 / 6–4	(Brazil) Lucas Campagnolo (Argentina) Maxi Sánchez	
11/5/2023	(Spain) Javi Garrido (Spain) Jon Sanz	W.O. (*inj.)	(Spain) Coki Nieto (Brazil) Pablo Lima*	
11/5/2023	(Argentina) Franco Stupaczuk (Argentina) Martín Di Nenno	6–2 / 6–2	(Spain) Javier García Mora (Spain) Javier González Barahona	
11/5/2023	(Spain) José García Diestro (Spain) Pincho Fernández	4–6 / 3–6	(Argentina) Fernando Belasteguín (Spain) Miguel Yanguas	
11/5/2023	(Brazil) Lucas Bergamini (Spain) Víctor Ruiz	6–4 / 1–6 / 2–6	(Argentina) Agustín Tapia (Spain) Arturo Coello	
11/5/2023	(Spain) Alex Ruiz (Argentina) Juan Tello	7–6 / 6–2	(Spain) Jaime Fermosell (Spain) Pablo García	

Women's

Date	Team A	Score	Team B	Refs.
11/5/2023	(Spain) Bea González (Argentina) Delfina Brea	6–2 / 6–4	(Spain) Lorena Rufo (Spain) Marta Talaván	
11/5/2023	(Spain) Eli Amatriaín (Spain) Sofía Saiz	1–6 / 4–6	(Argentina) Aranza Osoro (Spain) Lucía Sainz	
11/5/2023	(Argentina) Claudia Jensen (Spain) Jessica Castelló	6–2 / 6–2	(Spain) Claudia Fernández (Argentina) Julieta Bidahorria	
11/5/2023	(Italy) Carolina Orsi (France) Léa Godallier	2–6 / 4–6	(Spain) Gemma Triay (Spain) Alejandra Salazar	
11/5/2023	(Spain) Mª Carmen Villalba (Spain) Nuria Rodríguez	0–6 / 3–6	(Spain) Marta Ortega (Portugal) Sofia Araújo	
11/5/2023	(Spain) Carmen Goenaga (Spain) Marta Caparrós	1–6 / 4–6	(Spain) Majo Sánchez Alayeto (Spain) Mapi Sánchez Alayeto	
11/5/2023	(Spain) Ariana Sánchez (Spain) Paula Josemaría	6–0 / 6–2	(Sweden) Carolina Navarro (Spain) Marina Guinart	
11/5/2023	(Spain) Tamara Icardo (Argentina) Virginia Riera	6–2 / 6–3	(Spain) Marina Martínez (Spain) Teresa Navarro	

=== Quarter-Finals ===
Men's

Date	Team A	Score	Team B	Refs.
12/5/2023	(Argentina) Federico Chingotto (Spain) Paquito Navarro	6–4 / 6–7 / 6–7	(Spain) Momo González (Argentina) Sanyo Gutiérrez	
12/5/2023	(Spain) Alejandro Galán (Spain) Juan Lebrón	6–0 / 6–7 / 7–6	(Spain) Javi Garrido (Spain) Jon Sanz	
12/5/2023	(Argentina) Franco Stupaczuk (Argentina) Martín Di Nenno	7–5 / 6–7 / 6–3	(Argentina) Fernando Belasteguín (Spain) Miguel Yanguas	
12/5/2023	(Spain) Alex Ruiz (Argentina) Juan Tello	3–6 / 4–6	(Argentina) Agustín Tapia (Spain) Arturo Coello	

Women's

Date	Team A	Score	Team B	Refs.
12/5/2023	(Argentina) Claudia Jensen (Spain) Jessica Castelló	6–7 / 0–6	(Spain) Alejandra Salazar (Spain) Gemma Triay	
12/5/2023	(Spain) Bea González (Argentina) Delfina Brea	6–2 / 6–2	(Argentina) Aranza Osoro (Spain) Lucía Sainz	
12/5/2023	(Spain) Ariana Sánchez (Spain) Paula Josemaría	6–2 / 6–3	(Spain) Majo Sánchez Alayeto (Spain) Mapi Sánchez Alayeto	
12/5/2023	(Spain) Tamara Icardo (Argentina) Virginia Riera	3–6 / 3–6	(Spain) Marta Ortega (Portugal) Sofia Araújo	

=== Semi-Finals ===
Men's

Date	Team A	Score	Team B	Refs.
13/5/2023	(Spain) Alejandro Galán (Spain) Juan Lebrón	6–4 / 6–4	(Spain) Momo González (Argentina) Sanyo Gutiérrez	
13/5/2023	(Argentina) Franco Stupaczuk (Argentina) Martín Di Nenno	4–6 / 4–6	(Argentina) Agustín Tapia (Spain) Arturo Coello	

Women's

Date	Team A	Score	Team B	Refs.
13/5/2023	(Spain) Bea González (Argentina) Delfina Brea	6–4 / 2–6 / 3–6	(Spain) Alejandra Salazar (Spain) Gemma Triay	
13/5/2023	(Spain) Ariana Sánchez (Spain) Paula Josemaría	6–4 / 6–1	(Spain) Marta Ortega (Portugal) Sofia Araújo	

=== Finals ===
Men's

Date	Team A	Score	Team B	Refs.
14/5/2023	(Spain) Alejandro Galán (Spain) Juan Lebrón	3–6 / 7–6 / 6–7	(Argentina) Agustín Tapia (Spain) Arturo Coello	

Women's

Date	Team A	Score	Team B	Refs.
14/5/2023	(Spain) Ariana Sánchez (Spain) Paula Josemaría	6–2 / 6–3	(Spain) Alejandra Salazar (Spain) Gemma Triay	
