= 2023 WPT Málaga Open =

Padel championships

- Date: 24 – 30 July
- Edition: 6th
- Category: Open 1000
- Location: Málaga, Spain
- Venue: Palacio de Deportes José María Martín Carpena

Champions
- Men's doubles: (Argentina) Agustín Tapia (Spain) Arturo Coello
- Women's doubles: (Spain) Ariana Sánchez (Spain) Paula Josemaría

Chronology
Previous
Madrid P1 (PP)
Next
Mendoza P1 (PP)

The WPT 2023 Málaga Open (officially WPT 2023 Cervezas Victoria Málaga Open) was the fourteenth tournament of the eleventh edition of World Padel Tour. The tournament was played between the 24th and 30th of July 2023 at Palacio de Deportes José María Martín Carpena, Málaga.

In the women's category, the first and second ranked pair met in the finals, with the number ones Ariana Sánchez and Paula Josemaría claimed their ninth title of the season, after defeating Gemma Triay and Marta Ortega in the finals.

In the men's category, Agustín Tapia and Arturo Coello reached their eleventh final of the season, where they defeated Alex Ruiz and Juan Tello, to claim their tenth title (12 between WPT and PP) in fourteen World Padel Tour tournaments.

== Schedule ==
The final draw was played:

- Thursday 26 July: Round of 32.
- Thursday 27 July: Round of 16.
- Friday 28 July: Quarterfinals.
- Saturday 29 July: Semifinals.
- Sunday 30 July: Finals.

== Results ==
=== Men's Bracket ===
Round of 32
1	(Spain) Coello / (Argentina) Tapia	6	6
(France) B. Tison / (Spain) V. Gil	3	2
(Argentina) D. Perino / (Argentina) M. Lamperti	6	5	6
LL	(Spain) F. Sotillo / (Spain) P. Hernández	4	7	4
(Spain) J. Garrido / (Spain) J. Rico	6	6
(Spain) M. del Castillo / (Spain) M. Benítez	2	4
(Spain) A. Arroyo / (Spain) G. Rubio	3
8	(Argentina) L. Capra / (Argentina) Maxi	6	*
7	(Spain) Coki / (Spain) J. Sanz	6	1	6
(Argentina) A. Chozas / (Spain) A. Cepero	3	6	2
(Spain) I. Vilariño / (Spain) S. Oria	3	6	7
(Argentina) L. Augsburger / (Argentina) V. Libaak	6	3	6
(Spain) F. Gil / (Argentina) R. Moyano	6	1	5
(Spain) I. Ramírez / (Spain) J. Muñoz	1	6	7
(Spain) R. Méndez / (Spain) T. Bueno	2	2
4	(Spain) Momo / (Argentina) Sanyo	6	6
3	(Argentina) Chingotto / (Spain) Paquito	7	6
(Spain) A. Melendez / (Spain) P. Melendez	5	4
(Spain) E. Alonso / (Spain) J. Esbri	6	6
(Spain) J.G. Mora / (Spain) J. Marmolejo	4	4
(Brazil) L. Bergamini / (Spain) V. Ruiz	2	6	6
(Spain) J. Serrano / (Chile) J. Valdés	6	4	2
(Argentina) A. Gutiérrez / (Spain) J. Rico	3	2
5	(Spain) A. Ruiz / (Argentina) J. Tello	6	6
6	(Argentina) F. Belasteguín / (Spain) Yanguas	6	6
(Spain) A. Sans / (Spain) T. Zapata	3	4
(Spain) P. Cardona / (Spain) P. Fernandez	6	7
(Spain) J. Bautista / (Spain) J.M. Díaz	4	6
LS	(Spain) J. Leal / (Spain) J. Diestro	6	2
(Spain) A. Ayats / (Spain) F. Guerrero	7	3	*
(Spain) J. Ruiz / (Argentina) J.C. Belluati	2	4
2	(Spain) Galán / (Spain) Lebrón	6	6

Round of 16
1	(Spain) Coello / (Argentina) Tapia	6	6
(Argentina) D. Perino / (Argentina) M. Lamperti	0	0
(Spain) J. Garrido / (Spain) J. Rico	6	6
8	(Argentina) L. Capra / (Argentina) Maxi	1	3
7	(Spain) Coki / (Spain) J. Sanz	6	6
(Spain) I. Vilariño / (Spain) S. Oria	4	1
(Spain) I. Ramírez / (Spain) J. Muñoz	4	4
4	(Spain) Momo / (Argentina) Sanyo	6	6
3	(Argentina) Chingotto / (Spain) Paquito	6	6
(Spain) E. Alonso / (Spain) J. Esbri	1	3
(Brazil) L. Bergamini / (Spain) V. Ruiz	3	6	6
5	(Spain) A. Ruiz / (Argentina) J. Tello	6	1	7
6	(Argentina) F. Belasteguín / (Spain) Yanguas	7	3	*
(Spain) P. Cardona / (Spain) P. Fernandez	6	0
(Spain) A. Ayats / (Spain) F. Guerrero	4	4
2	(Spain) Galán / (Spain) Lebrón	6	6

Quarter-Final
1	(Spain) Coello / (Argentina) Tapia	6	6
(Spain) J. Garrido / (Spain) J. Rico	3	4
7	(Spain) Coki / (Spain) J. Sanz	2	6	6
4	(Spain) Momo / (Argentina) Sanyo	6	3	3
3	(Argentina) Chingotto / (Spain) Paquito	5	6	1
5	(Spain) A. Ruiz / (Argentina) J. Tello	7	1	6
6	(Argentina) F. Belasteguín / (Spain) Yanguas	6	3	2
2	(Spain) Galán / (Spain) Lebrón	2	6	6

Semi-Finals
1	(Spain) Coello / (Argentina) Tapia	5	6	6
7	(Spain) C. Nieto / (Spain) J. Sanz	7	1	0
5	(Spain) A. Ruiz / (Argentina) J. Tello	6	6
2	(Spain) Galán / (Spain) Lebrón	2	4

Finals
1	(Spain) Coello / (Argentina) Tapia	7	7
5	(Spain) A. Ruiz / (Argentina) J. Tello	5	6

=== Women's Bracket ===
Round of 32
1	(Spain) A. Sánchez / (Spain) P. Josemaria
Bye
(Spain) A. Soriano / (Spain) S. Bellver	5	2
(Russia) K. Sharifova / (Spain) M. Borrero	7	6
(Spain) A. Pérez / (Spain) S. Ruiz	4	5
(Spain) E. Amatriaín / (Spain) S. Saiz	6	7
(Sweden) C. Navarro / (Spain) M. Guinart	2	1
6	(Argentina) A. Osoro / (Spain) L. Sainz	6	6
5	(Spain) Majo / (Spain) Mapi	6	7
(Italy) C. Casali / (Spain) R. Segura	0	5
(Spain) N. Rodriguez / (Spain) M. Talaván	6	6
(Spain) L. Rufo / (Spain) M. Martínez	4	2
(Spain) A. Alonso / (Spain) A. Ustero	7	6
(Spain) E. Carnicero / (Spain) M. Villalba	6	4
Bye
3	(Spain) B. González / (Argentina) D. Brea
4	(Spain) T. Icardo / (Argentina) V. Riera
Bye
(Spain) L. Alonso / (Spain) L. Pascual	1	4
(Portugal) A. Nogueira / (Spain) M. Merino	6	6
(France) A. Collombon / (Spain) V. Iglesias	3	6	6
(Spain) A. Cañellas / (Spain) C. Mesa	6	2	3
(Italy) C. Orsi / (Spain) P. Llaguno	2	4
8	(Argentina) C. Jensen / (Spain) V. Virseda	3	6	6
7	(Spain) J. Castelló / (Portugal) S. Araújo	6	6
(Spain) C. Goenaga / (Spain) L. Martínez	3	2
(Spain) B. Caldera / (Spain) M. Barrera	6	6
(Spain) P. Martinez / (Spain) X. Clasca	2	3
(Spain) A. Martinez / (Spain) T. Navarro	6	6
(France) L. Godallier / (Spain) M. Caparros	0	1
Bye
2	(Spain) Gemma Triay / (Spain) Marta Ortega

Round of 16
1	(Spain) A. Sánchez / (Spain) P. Josemaria	6	6
(Russia) K. Sharifova / (Spain) M. Borrero	1	0
(Spain) E. Amatriaín / (Spain) S. Saiz	2	3
6	(Argentina) A. Osoro / (Spain) L. Sainz	6	6
5	(Spain) Majo / (Spain) Mapi	7	6
(Spain) N. Rodriguez / (Spain) M. Talaván	5	2
(Spain) A. Alonso / (Spain) A. Ustero	6	1	2
3	(Spain) B. González / (Argentina) D. Brea	2	6	6
4	(Spain) T. Icardo / (Argentina) V. Riera	6	6
(Portugal) A. Nogueira / (Spain) M. Merino	2	1
(France) A. Collombon / (Spain) V. Iglesias	3	5
8	(Argentina) C. Jensen / (Spain) V. Virseda	6	7
7	(Spain) J. Castelló / (Portugal) S. Araújo	7	7
(Spain) B. Caldera / (Spain) M. Barrera	6	6
(Spain) A. Martinez / (Spain) T. Navarro	1	0
2	(Spain) G. Triay / (Spain) M. Ortega	6	6

Quarter-Final
1	(Spain) A. Sánchez / (Spain) P. Josemaria	6	6
6	(Argentina) A. Osoro / (Spain) L. Sainz	4	3
5	(Spain) Majo / (Spain) Mapi	1	4
3	(Spain) B. González / (Argentina) D. Brea	6	6
4	(Spain) T. Icardo / (Argentina) V. Riera	6	6
8	(Argentina) C. Jensen / (Spain) V. Virseda	2	0
7	(Spain) J. Castelló / (Portugal) S. Araújo	0	1
2	(Spain) G. Triay / (Spain) M. Ortega	6	6

Semi-Finals
1	(Spain) A. Sánchez / (Spain) P. Josemaría	6	6
3	(Spain) B. González / (Argentina) D. Brea	3	2
4	(Spain) T. Icardo / (Argentina) V. Riera	2	1
2	(Spain) G. Triay / (Spain) M. Ortega	6	6

Finals
1	(Spain) A. Sánchez / (Spain) P. Josemaría	6	6
2	(Spain) G. Triay / (Spain) M. Ortega	4	3

=== Round of 32 ===
Men's

Date	Winners	Score	Opponent	Refs.
26/7/2023	(Argentina) Agustín Tapia (Spain) Arturo Coello	6–3 / 6–2	(France) Benjamin Tison (Spain) Victor Mena Gil	
26/7/2023	(Argentina) Denis Perino (Argentina) Miguel Lamperti	6–4 / 5–7 / 6–4	(Spain) Ferran Sotillo (Spain) Pol Hernández	
26/7/2023	(Spain) Javi Garrido (Spain) Javi Rico	6–2 / 6–4	(Spain) Mario del Castillo (Spain) Miguel Benítez	
26/7/2023	(Argentina) Lucho Capra (Argentina) Maxi Sánchez	6–3 / W.O.	(Spain) Alejandro Arroyo (Spain) Gonzalo Rubio	
26/7/2023	(Spain) Coki Nieto (Spain) Jon Sanz	6–3 / 1–6 / 6–2	(Argentina) Alex Chozas (Spain) Alvaro Cepero	
26/7/2023	(Spain) Ignacio Vilariño (Spain) Salvador Oria	3–6 / 6–3 / 7–6	(Argentina) Leo Augsburger (Argentina) Valentino Libaak	
26/7/2023	(Spain) Iván Ramírez (Spain) Jaime Muñoz	1–6 / 6–1 / 7–5	(Spain) Francisco Gil (Argentina) Ramiro Moyano	
26/7/2023	(Spain) Momo González (Argentina) Sanyo Gutiérrez	6–2 / 6–2	(Spain) Rafael Méndez (Spain) Toni Bueno	
26/7/2023	(Argentina) Federico Chingotto (Spain) Paquito Navarro	7–5 / 6–4	(Spain) Alvaro Melendez Amaya (Spain) Pedro Melendez Amaya	
26/7/2023	(Spain) Eduardo Alonso (Spain) Juanlu Esbri	6–4 / 6–4	(Spain) Javier García Mora (Spain) Jose Solano Marmolejo	
26/7/2023	(Brazil) Lucas Bergamini (Spain) Víctor Ruiz	2–6 / 6–4 / 6–2	(Spain) Jose Sanchez Serrano (Chile) Javier Valdés	
26/7/2023	(Spain) Alex Ruiz (Argentina) Juan Tello	6–3 / 6–2	(Argentina) Agustín Gutiérrez (Spain) Josete Rico	
26/7/2023	(Argentina) Fernando Belasteguín (Spain) Miguel Yanguas	6–3 / 6–4	(Spain) Antón Sans (Spain) Teodoro Zapata	
26/7/2023	(Spain) Pablo Cardona (Spain) Pincho Fernandez	6–4 / 7–6	(Spain) Jairo Bautista (Spain) Juan Martín Díaz	
26/7/2023	(Spain) Arnau Ayats (Spain) Francisco Guerrero	7–6 / 3–2 / W.O.	(Spain) Javier Leal (Spain) José García Diestro	
26/7/2023	(Spain) Alejandro Galán (Spain) Juan Lebrón	6–2 / 6–4	(Spain) Javi Ruiz (Argentina) Juan Cruz Belluati	

Women's

Date	Winners	Score	Opponent	Refs.
26/7/2023	(Russia) Ksenia Sharifova (Spain) Marta Borrero	7–5 / 6–2	(Spain) Arantxa Soriano (Spain) Sandra Bellver	
26/7/2023	(Spain) Eli Amatriaín (Spain) Sofía Saiz	6–4 / 7–5	(Spain) Águeda Pérez (Spain) Sara Ruiz	
26/7/2023	(Argentina) Aranza Osoro (Spain) Lucía Sainz	6–2 / 6–1	(Sweden) Carolina Navarro (Spain) Marina Guinart	
26/7/2023	(Spain) Majo Sánchez Alayeto (Spain) Mapi Sánchez Alayeto	6–0 / 7–5	(Italy) Carlotta Casali (Spain) Raquel Segura	
26/7/2023	(Spain) Nuria Rodriguez (Spain) Marta Talaván	6–4 / 6–2	(Spain) Lorena Rufo (Spain) Marina Martínez	
26/7/2023	(Spain) Alejandra Alonso (Spain) Andrea Ustero	7–6 / 6–4	(Spain) Esther Carnicero (Spain) Mª Carmen Villalba	
26/7/2023	(Portugal) Ana Catarina Nogueira (Spain) Melania Merino	6–1 / 6–4	(Spain) Lorena Alonso (Spain) Lourdes Pascual	
26/7/2023	(France) Alix Collombon (Spain) Victoria Iglesias	3–6 / 6–2 / 6–3	(Spain) Ariadna Cañellas (Spain) Carla Mesa	
26/7/2023	(Argentina) Claudia Jensen (Spain) Verónica Virseda	3–6 / 6–2 / 6–4	(Italy) Carolina Orsi (Spain) Patty Llaguno	
26/7/2023	(Spain) Jessica Castelló (Portugal) Sofia Araújo	6–3 / 6–2	(Spain) Carmen Goenaga (Spain) Lucía Martínez	
26/7/2023	(Spain) Beatriz Caldera (Spain) Marta Barrera	6–2 / 6–3	(Spain) Patricia Martinez (Spain) Xenia Clasca	
26/7/2023	(Spain) Araceli Martinez (Spain) Teresa Navarro	6–0 / 6–1	(France) Léa Godallier (Spain) Marta Caparros	

=== Round of 16 ===
Men's

Date	Team A	Score	Team B	Refs.
27/7/2023	(Argentina) Agustín Tapia (Spain) Arturo Coello	6–0 / 6–0	(Argentina) Denis Perino (Argentina) Miguel Lamperti	
27/7/2023	(Spain) Javi Garrido (Spain) Javi Rico	6–1 / 6–3	(Argentina) Lucho Capra (Argentina) Maxi Sánchez	
27/7/2023	(Spain) Coki Nieto (Spain) Jon Sanz	6–4 / 6–1	(Spain) Ignacio Vilariño (Spain) Salvador Oria	
27/7/2023	(Spain) Momo González (Argentina) Sanyo Gutiérrez	6–4 / 6–4	(Spain) Iván Ramírez (Spain) Jaime Muñoz	
27/7/2023	(Argentina) Federico Chingotto (Spain) Paquito Navarro	6–1 / 6–3	(Spain) Eduardo Alonso (Spain) Juanlu Esbri	
27/7/2023	(Spain) Alex Ruiz (Argentina) Juan Tello	6–3 / 1–6 / 7–6	(Brazil) Lucas Bergamini (Spain) Víctor Ruiz	
27/7/2023	(Argentina) Fernando Belasteguín (Spain) Miguel Yanguas	7–6 / 3–0 / W.O.	(Spain) Pablo Cardona (Spain) Pincho Fernandez	
27/7/2023	(Spain) Alejandro Galán (Spain) Juan Lebrón	6–4 / 6–4	(Spain) Arnau Ayats (Spain) Francisco Guerrero	

Women's

Date	Team A	Score	Team B	Refs.
27/7/2023	(Spain) Ariana Sánchez (Spain) Paula Josemaria	6–1 / 6–0	(Russia) Ksenia Sharifova (Spain) Marta Borrero	
27/7/2023	(Argentina) Aranza Osoro (Spain) Lucía Sainz	6–2 / 6–3	(Spain) Eli Amatriaín (Spain) Sofía Saiz	
27/7/2023	(Spain) Majo Sánchez Alayeto (Spain) Mapi Sánchez Alayeto	7–5 / 6–2	(Spain) Nuria Rodriguez (Spain) Marta Talaván	
27/7/2023	(Spain) Bea González (Argentina) Delfina Brea	2–6 / 6–1 / 6–2	(Spain) Alejandra Alonso (Spain) Andrea Ustero	
27/7/2023	(Spain) Tamara Icardo (Argentina) Virginia Riera	6–2 / 6–1	(Portugal) Ana Catarina Nogueira (Spain) Melania Merino	
27/7/2023	(Argentina) Claudia Jensen (Spain) Verónica Virseda	6–3 / 7–5	(France) Alix Collombon (Spain) Victoria Iglesias	
27/7/2023	(Spain) Jessica Castelló (Portugal) Sofia Araújo	7–6 / 7–6	(Spain) Beatriz Caldera (Spain) Marta Barrera	
27/7/2023	(Spain) Gemma Triay (Spain) Marta Ortega	6–1 / 6–0	(Spain) Araceli Martinez (Spain) Teresa Navarro	

=== Quarter-Finals ===
Men's

Date	Team A	Score	Team B	Refs.
28/7/2023	(Argentina) Agustín Tapia (Spain) Arturo Coello	6–3 / 6–4	(Spain) Javi Garrido (Spain) Javi Rico	
28/7/2023	(Spain) Coki Nieto (Spain) Jon Sanz	2–6 / 6–3 / 6–3	(Spain) Momo González (Argentina) Sanyo Gutiérrez	
28/7/2023	(Spain) Alex Ruiz (Argentina) Juan Tello	7–5 / 1–6 / 6–1	(Argentina) Federico Chingotto (Spain) Paquito Navarro	
28/7/2023	(Spain) Alejandro Galán (Spain) Juan Lebrón	2–6 / 6–3 / 6–2	(Argentina) Fernando Belasteguín (Spain) Miguel Yanguas	

Women's

Date	Team A	Score	Team B	Refs.
28/7/2023	(Spain) Ariana Sánchez (Spain) Paula Josemaria	6–4 / 6–3	(Argentina) Aranza Osoro (Spain) Lucía Sainz	
28/7/2023	(Spain) Bea González (Argentina) Delfina Brea	6–1 / 6–4	(Spain) Majo Sánchez Alayeto (Spain) Mapi Sánchez Alayeto	
28/7/2023	(Spain) Tamara Icardo (Argentina) Virginia Riera	6–2 / 6–0	(Argentina) Claudia Jensen (Spain) Verónica Virseda	
28/7/2023	(Spain) Gemma Triay (Spain) Marta Ortega	6–0 / 6–1	(Spain) Jessica Castelló (Portugal) Sofia Araújo	

=== Semi-Finals ===
Men's

Date	Team A	Score	Team B	Refs.
29/7/2023	(Argentina) Agustín Tapia (Spain) Arturo Coello	5–7 / 6–1 / 6–0	(Spain) Coki Nieto (Spain) Jon Sanz	
29/7/2023	(Spain) Alex Ruiz (Argentina) Juan Tello	6–2 / 6–4	(Spain) Alejandro Galán (Spain) Juan Lebrón	

Women's

Date	Team A	Score	Team B	Refs.
29/7/2023	(Spain) Ariana Sánchez (Spain) Paula Josemaría	6–3 / 6–2	(Spain) Bea González (Argentina) Delfina Brea	
29/7/2023	(Spain) Gemma Triay (Spain) Marta Ortega	6–2 / 6–1	(Spain) Tamara Icardo (Argentina) Virginia Riera	

=== Finals ===
Men's

Date	Team A	Score	Team B	Refs.
30/7/2023	(Argentina) Agustín Tapia (Spain) Arturo Coello	7–5 / 7–6	(Spain) Alex Ruiz (Argentina) Juan Tello	

Women's

Date	Team A	Score	Team B	Refs.
30/7/2023	(Spain) Ariana Sánchez (Spain) Paula Josemaría	6–4 / 6–3	(Spain) Gemma Triay (Spain) Marta Ortega	
