= 2023 Valladolid Master =

Padel championships

- Date: 30 May – 4 June
- Edition: 8th
- Category: Master
- Location: Valladolid, Spain
- Venue: Plaza Mayor de Valladolid

Champions
- Men's doubles: (Argentina) Franco Stupaczuk (Argentina) Martín Di Nenno
- Women's doubles: (Spain) Bea González (Argentina) Delfina Brea

Chronology

The WPT Valladolid Master 2023 (officially WPT Barceló Valladolid Master 2023) was the twelfth tournament of the eleventh edition of World Padel Tour, and the third Master tournament of the season. The final phase will be played between the 20th and 25th of June 2023 at Plaza Mayor de Valladolid, España, while the previous phase will be played between the 17th and 19th of March.

In the women's category, "Las Superpibas" Bea González and Delfina Brea won their second tournament of the season, defeating the number two pair Gemma Triay and Marta Ortega in a three sets final.

In the men's category, the "Superpibes" Franco Stupaczuk and Martín Di Nenno won their third WPT title of the year, defeating the number one ranked Agustin Tapia and Arturo Coello 6–4, 4–6, 7–6 in the final, giving the "Golden Boys" their first defeat as a team in WPT after six months of invincibility.

== Registered teams ==
Male

Rnk.	Team	WPT Ranking Points
1	(Argentina) Agustín Tapia (Spain) Arturo Coello	34.865
2	(Argentina) Franco Stupaczuk (Argentina) Martín Di Nenno	22.140
3	(Spain) Alejandro Galán (Spain) Jon Sanz	17.975
4	(Spain) Momo González (Argentina) Sanyo Gutiérrez	16.235
5	(Argentina) Federico Chingotto (Spain) Paquito Navarro	14.740
6	(Argentina) Fernando Belasteguín (Spain) Miguel Yanguas	12.954
7	(Spain) Alex Ruiz (Argentina) Juan Tello	11.850
8	(Argentina) Lucho Capra (Argentina) Maxi Sánchez	8.103
9	(Spain) Iván Ramírez (Brazil) Pablo Lima	7.790
10	(Brazil) Lucas Campagnolo (Spain) Javi Garrido	7.656
11	(Spain) José García Diestro (Spain) Pincho Fernández	6.646
12	(Spain) Alejandro Arroyo (Spain) Gonzalo Rubio	6.528
13	(Spain) Coki Nieto (Spain) Pablo Cardona	5.385
14	(Spain) Francisco Gil (Argentina) Ramiro Moyano	4.942
15	(Argentina) Agustín Gutiérrez (Spain) Josete Rico	4.580
16	(Spain) Eduardo Alonso (Spain) Juanlu Esbri	4.565
17	(Brazil) Lucas Bergamini (Spain) Víctor Ruiz	4.051
18	(Spain) Javier Leal (Argentina) Juan Cruz Belluati	4.010
19	(Spain) Javier García Mora (Spain) Javier González Barahona	3.933
20	(Spain) Javi Rico (Argentina) Leo Augsburger	3.920
21	(Spain) Jaime Muñoz (Argentina) Miguel Lamperti	3.630
22	(Spain) Marc Quílez (Argentina) Valentino Libaak	3.091
23	(Argentina) Agustín Gomez Silingo (Spain) Álvaro Cepero	2.883
24	(Spain) Mario del Castillo (Spain) Miguel Benítez	2.873
25	(Spain) Ignacio Vilariño (Spain) Salvador Oria	2.731
26	(Spain) Antón Sans (Spain) Teodoro Zapata	2.713
27	(Spain) Rafael Méndez (Spain) Toni Bueno	2.623
28	(Spain) Javier Martínez (Spain) Jorge Ruiz	2.407
Qualified from the preliminary rounds
A	(Spain) Jairo Bautista (Argentina) Juan Martín Díaz	2.353
B	(Spain) José Jiménez (Spain) Martín Sanchez Piñeiro	1.578
C	(Spain) Jaime Fermosell (Spain) Raúl Marcos	1.664
D	(Spain) Arnau Ayats (Spain) Francisco Guerrero	2.135

Female

Rnk.	Team	WPT Ranking Points
1	(Spain) Ariana Sánchez (Spain) Paula Josemaría	40.880
2	(Spain) Gemma Triay (Spain) Marta Ortega	27.880
3	(Spain) Bea González (Argentina) Delfina Brea	15.890
4	(Spain) Tamara Icardo (Argentina) Virginia Riera	13.089
5	(Argentina) Aranza Osoro (Spain) Lucía Sainz	10.643
6	(Spain) Majo Sánchez Alayeto (Spain) Mapi Sánchez Alayeto	10.039
7	(Spain) Jessica Castelló (Portugal) Sofia Araújo	9.813
8	(Argentina) Claudia Jensen (Spain) Verónica Virseda	8.376
9	(Spain) Nuria Rodríguez (Spain) Patty Llaguno	7.220
10	(France) Alix Collombon (Spain) Victoria Iglesias	6.634
11	(Spain) Lorena Rufo (Spain) Marta Talaván	4.943
12	(Spain) Claudia Fernández (Argentina) Julieta Bidahorria	4.230
13	(Sweden) Carolina Navarro (Spain) Marina Guinart	3.971
14	(Spain) Carmen Goenaga (Spain) Lucía Martínez	3.803
15	(Spain) Beatriz Caldera (France) Léa Godallier	3.294
16	(Spain) Esther Carnicero (Spain) Mª Carmen Villalba	3.243
17	(Portugal) Ana Catarina Nogueira (Spain) Melania Merino	2.962
18	(Spain) Eli Amatriaín (Spain) Sofía Saiz	2.946
19	(Spain) Marina Martínez (Spain) Teresa Navarro	2.937
20	(Spain) Ariadna Cañellas (Spain) Carla Mesa	2.743
21	(Spain) Águeda Pérez (Spain) Sara Ruiz	2.598
22	(Spain) Arantxa Soriano (Spain) Sandra Bellver	2.565
23	(Italy) Carlotta Casali (Spain) Jimena Velasco	1.949
24	(Spain) Martina Fassio (Spain) Sandra Hernández	1.919
25	(Spain) Alicia Blanco (Spain) Raquel Segura	1.907
26	(Spain) Ana Fernandez de Ossó (Spain) Laia Rodríguez	1.867
27	(Spain) Lara Arruabarrena (Spain) Sara Pujals	1.823
28	(Russia) Ksenia Sharifova (Spain) Marta Borrero	1.692
Qualified from the preliminary rounds
A	(Spain) Alejandra Alonso (Spain) Andrea Ustero	1.634
B	(Spain) Carmen Castillón (Spain) Nuria Vivancos	1.589
C	(Spain) Mireia Herrada (Spain) Noemí Aguilar	1.084
D	(Spain) Marina Pinacho (Brazil) Manuela Schuck	919

Men's teams missing

Rnk.	Team	Ref.
	(Spain) Gonzalo Rubio (Spain) Javier Ruiz	(Note: Javi Ruiz was injured three tournaments ago. Rubio would play with his ex-partner Alex Arroyo until Javi recovered.)
	(Spain) Alejandro Galán (Spain) Juan Lebrón	(Note: Lebrón reinjured his upper arm in the Danish Open, which forced him to withdraw before his round of 16 match. Galán began playing with Jon Sanz, who will be his temporary companion until Lebrón recovers.)

Women's teams missing

Rnk.	Team	Ref.
	(Spain) Nuria Rodríguez (Spain) Patty Llaguno	(Note: Carolina Orsi was not be able to compete in this tournament due to international commitments with the Italian national team. Patty played with Nuria Rodríguez.)
	(Spain) Araceli Martínez (France) Léa Godallier	(Note: Araceli would compete in the European Games. Léa played with Bea Caldera.)
	(Spain) Noa Cánovas (Spain) Jimena Velasco	(Note: Noa would comepete in the European Games. Jimena played with Carlotta Casali.)
	(Italy) Emily Stellato (Italy) Giulia Sussarello	(Note: Both competed in the European Games.)

== Schedule ==
The matches began on Saturday with the qualifying rounds:

- Saturday 17th: Men's qualifying rounds 1 and 2.
- Sunday 18: 2nd and 3rd round of men's qualifying and 1st round of women's qualifying
- Monday 19: last round of men's qualifying and 2nd and final round of women's qualifying.

The final draw was played immediately afterward:

- Tuesday 20th: Round of 32.
- Wednesday 21st: Round of 32.
- Thursday 22nd: Round of 16.
- Friday 23rd: Quarterfinals.
- Saturday 24th: Semifinals.
- Sunday 25th: Finals.

== Results ==
=== Men's Bracket ===
Round of 32
1	(Spain) Coello / (Argentina) Tapia	6	7
28	(Spain) J. Ruiz / (Spain) J. Martínez	2	6
22	(Spain) M. Quílez / (Argentina) V. Libaak	1	2
13	(Spain) C. Nieto / (Spain) P. Cardona	6	6
27	(Spain) R. Méndez / (Spain) T. Bueno	7	6
C	(Spain) J. Fermosell / (Spain) R. Marcos	5	4
12	(Spain) A. Arroyo / (Spain) G. Rubio	7	4	6
8	(Argentina) L. Capra / (Argentina) Maxi	6	6	7
6	(Argentina) F. Belasteguín / (Spain) M. Yanguas	7	6
11	(Spain) J.G. Diestro / (Spain) P. Fernández	5	3
9	(Spain) I. Ramírez / (Brazil) Pablo Lima	7	4	6
D	(Spain) A. Ayats / (Spain) F. Guerrero	6	6	7
25	(Spain) I. Vilariño / (Spain) S. Oria	3	3
20	(Spain) J. Rico / (Argentina) L. Augsburger	6	6
10	(Brazil) L. Campagnolo / (Spain) J. Garrido	7	4	6
4	(Spain) Momo / (Argentina) Sanyo	6	6	3
3	(Spain) Galán / (Spain) J. Sanz	6	6
15	(Argentina) A. Gutiérrez / (Spain) J. Rico	4	3
21	(Spain) J. Muñoz / (Argentina) M. Lamperti	6	6
B	(Spain) J. Jiménez / (Spain) M. Piñeiro	4	3
17	(Brazil) L. Bergamini / (Spain) V. Ruiz	6	6
16	(Spain) E. Alonso / (Spain) J. Esbri	4	4
18	(Spain) J. Leal / (Argentina) J.C. Belluati	1	0
5	(Argentina) Chingotto / (Spain) Paquito	6	6
7	(Spain) A. Ruiz / (Argentina) J. Tello	6	7
23	(Argentina) A. Silingo / (Spain) A. Cepero	1	5
14	(Spain) F. Gil / (Argentina) R. Moyano	2	4
24	(Spain) M. del Castillo / (Spain) M. Benítez	6	6
A	(Spain) J. Bautista / (Spain) J.M. Díaz	6	7
26	(Spain) A. Sans / (Spain) T. Zapata	3	5
19	(Spain) J.G. Mora / (Spain) J.G. Barahona	3	4
2	(Argentina) F. Stupaczuk / (Argentina) Di Nenno	6	6

Round of 16
1	(Spain) Coello / (Argentina) Tapia	7	7
13	(Spain) Coki / (Spain) P. Cardona	6	5
27	(Spain) R. Méndez / (Spain) T. Bueno	6	1	1
8	(Argentina) Capra / (Argentina) Maxi	4	6	6
6	(Argentina) F. Belasteguín / (Spain) Yanguas	6	2
D	(Spain) A. Ayats / (Spain) F. Guerrero	2	1
20	(Spain) J. Rico / (Argentina) L. Augsburger	6	4	3
10	(Brazil) L. Campagnolo / (Spain) J. Garrido	2	6	5
3	(Spain) Galán / (Spain) J. Sanz	6	6
21	(Spain) J. Muñoz / (Argentina) M. Lamperti	3	4
17	(Brazil) L. Bergamini / (Spain) V. Ruiz	3	2
5	(Argentina) Chingotto / (Spain) Paquito	6	6
7	(Spain) A. Ruiz / (Argentina) J. Tello	6	6
24	(Spain) M. del Castillo / (Spain) M. Benítez	4	1
A	(Spain) J. Bautista / (Spain) J.M. Díaz	4	3
2	(Argentina) F. Stupaczuk / (Argentina) Di Nenno	6	6

Quarter-Final
1	(Spain) Coello / (Argentina) Tapia	6	4	6
8	(Argentina) L. Capra / (Argentina) Maxi	3	6	2
6	(Argentina) F. Belasteguín / (Spain) Yanguas	3	6
10	(Brazil) L. Campagnolo / (Spain) J. Garrido	6	7
3	(Spain) Galán / (Spain) J. Sanz	7	6
5	(Argentina) Chingotto / (Spain) Paquito	5	3
7	(Spain) A. Ruiz / (Argentina) J. Tello	2	5
2	(Argentina) F. Stupaczuk / (Argentina) Di Nenno	6	7

Semi-Finals
1	(Spain) Coello / (Argentina) Tapia	*
10	(Brazil) L. Campagnolo / (Spain) J. Garrido
3	(Spain) Galán / (Spain) J. Sanz	6	4	1
2	(Argentina) F. Stupaczuk / (Argentina) Di Nenno	2	6	6

Finals
1	(Spain) Coello / (Argentina) Tapia	6	4	6
2	(Argentina) F. Stupaczuk / (Argentina) Di Nenno	4	6	7

=== Women's Bracket ===
Round of 32
1	(Spain) Ariana / (Spain) Paula	6	6
24	(Spain) M. Fassio / (Spain) S. Hernández	1	1
16	(Spain) E. Carnicero / (Spain) M. Villalba	6	6
25	(Spain) A. Blanco / (Spain) R. Segura	1	3
11	(Spain) L. Rufo / (Spain) M. Talaván	2	4
A	(Spain) A. Alonso / (Spain) A. Ustero	6	6
C	(Spain) M. Herrada / (Spain) N. Aguilar	3	3
6	(Spain) Majo / (Spain) Mapi	6	6
5	(Argentina) A. Osoro / (Spain) L. Sainz	6	6
13	(Sweden) C. Navarro / (Spain) M. Guinart	1	2
14	(Spain) C. Goenaga / (Spain) L. Martínez	4	6	6
22	(Spain) A. Soriano / (Spain) S. Bellver	6	4	2
27	(Spain) L. Arruabarrena / (Spain) S. Pujals	4	4
9	(Spain) N. Rodríguez / (Spain) P. Llaguno	6	6
12	(Spain) C. Fernández / (Argentina) J. Bidahorria	1	4
3	(Spain) B. González / (Argentina) D. Brea	6	6
4	(Spain) T. Icardo / (Argentina) V. Riera	6	6
20	(Spain) A. Cañellas / (Spain) C. Mesa	2	1
28	(Russia) K. Sharifova / (Spain) M. Borrero	4	4
18	(Spain) E. Amatriaín / (Spain) S. Saiz	6	6
B	(Spain) C. Castillón / (Spain) N. Vivancos	7	3	6
26	(Spain) A. de Ossó / (Spain) L. Rodríguez	5	6	1
17	(Portugal) A. Nogueira / (Spain) M. Merino	4	4
8	(Argentina) C. Jensen / (Spain) V. Virseda	6	6
7	(Spain) J. Castelló / (Portugal) S. Araújo	6	6
D	(Spain) M. Pinacho / (Brazil) M. Schuck	1	3
21	(Spain) A. Pérez / (Spain) S. Ruiz	6	1	3
19	(Spain) M. Martínez / (Spain) T. Navarro	4	6	6
23	(Italy) C. Casali / (Spain) J. Velasco	6	3	2
10	(France) A. Collombon / (Spain) V. Iglesias	4	6	6
15	(Spain) B. Caldera / (France) L. Godallier	2	4
2	(Spain) G. Triay / (Spain) M. Ortega	6	6

Round of 16
1	(Spain) A. Sánchez / (Spain) P. Josemaría	7	6
16	(Spain) E. Carnicero / (Spain) M. Villalba	5	4
A	(Spain) A. Alonso / (Spain) A. Ustero	6	6
6	(Spain) Majo / (Spain) Mapi	3	1
5	(Argentina) A. Osoro / (Spain) L. Sainz	6	6
14	(Spain) C. Goenaga / (Spain) L. Martínez	1	2
9	(Spain) N. Rodríguez / (Spain) P. Llaguno	1	4
3	(Spain) B. González / (Argentina) D. Brea	6	6
4	(Spain) T. Icardo / (Argentina) V. Riera	6	6
18	(Spain) E. Amatriaín / (Spain) S. Saiz	1	3
B	(Spain) C. Castillón / (Spain) N. Vivancos	3	6
8	(Argentina) C. Jensen / (Spain) V. Virseda	6	7
7	(Spain) J. Castelló / (Portugal) S. Araújo	6	4	6
19	(Spain) M. Martínez / (Spain) T. Navarro	3	6	4
10	(France) A. Collombon / (Spain) V. Iglesias	4	1
2	(Spain) G. Triay / (Spain) M. Ortega	6	6

Quarter-Final
1	(Spain) Ariana / (Spain) Paula	4	6	6
A	(Spain) A. Alonso / (Spain) A. Ustero	6	0	4
5	(Argentina) A. Osoro / (Spain) L. Sainz	3	1
3	(Spain) B. González / (Argentina) D. Brea	6	6
4	(Spain) T. Icardo / (Argentina) V. Riera	6	7
8	(Argentina) C. Jensen / (Spain) V. Virseda	4	6
7	(Spain) J. Castelló / (Portugal) S. Araújo	4	6
2	(Spain) G. Triay / (Spain) M. Ortega	6	7

Semi-Finals
1	(Spain) Ariana / (Spain) Paula	6	4
3	(Spain) B. González / (Argentina) D. Brea	7	6
4	(Spain) T. Icardo / (Argentina) V. Riera	6	2	6
2	(Spain) G. Triay / (Spain) M. Ortega	4	6	7

Finals
3	(Spain) B. González / (Argentina) D. Brea	6	5	6
2	(Spain) G. Triay / (Spain) M. Ortega	2	7	2

Men's

Data	Qualified	WPT Ranking Point	Opponents	Result
A	(Spain) Jairo Bautista (Argentina) Juan Martín Díaz	2.353 vs 1.560	(Italy) Denis T. Perino (Italy) Facundo Domínguez	6–2 / 7–5
B	(Spain) José Jiménez (Spain) Martín Sanchez Piñeiro	1.578 vs 829	(Spain) Iñigo Jofre (Spain) Jaime Menéndez	6–2 / 4–6 / 6–4
C	(Spain) Jaime Fermosell (Spain) Raúl Marcos	1.664 vs 1.306	(Spain) Borja Yribarren (Spain) Cristobal García	6–4 / 6–1
D	(Spain) Arnau Ayats (Spain) Francisco Guerrero	2.135 vs 1.492	(Spain) Enrique Goenaga (Spain) Luis Hernández	6–3 / 6–3

Women's

Data	Qualified	WPT Ranking Point	Opponents	Result
Letra A	(Spain) Alejandra Alonso (Spain) Andrea Ustero	1.634 vs 1.012	(Spain) Julia Polo (Spain) Lucía Pérez	7–5 / 6–2
B	(Spain) Carmen Castillón (Spain) Nuria Vivancos	1.589 vs 1.092	(Spain) Letizia Manquillo (Portugal) Patrícia Ribeiro	6–2 / 6–1
C	(Spain) Mireia Herrada (Spain) Noemí Aguilar	1.084 vs 515	(Spain) Ainhoa Rico (Spain) Rebeca López	6–3 / 7–5
D	(Spain) Marina Pinacho (Brazil) Manuela Schuck	919 vs 929	(Spain) Ana Varo (Spain) Nicole Traviesa	6–3 / 6–3

=== Round of 32 ===
Men's

Date	Team A	Score	Team B	Refs.
20/6/2023	(Brazil) Lucas Bergamini (Spain) Víctor Ruiz	6–4 / 6–4	(Spain) Eduardo Alonso (Spain) Juanlu Esbri	
20/6/2023	(Argentina) Fernando Belasteguín (Spain) Miguel Yanguas	7–5 / 6–3	(Spain) José García Diestro (Spain) Pincho Fernández	
20/6/2023	(Spain) Marc Quílez (Argentina) Valentino Libaak	1–6 / 2–6	(Spain) Coki Nieto (Spain) Pablo Cardona	
20/6/2023	(Spain) Rafael Méndez (Spain) Toni Bueno	7–5 / 6–4	(Spain) Jaime Fermosell (Spain) Raúl Marcos	
20/6/2023	(Spain) Alejandro Arroyo (Spain) Gonzalo Rubio	7–6 / 4–6 / 6–7	(Argentina) Lucho Capra (Argentina) Maxi Sánchez	
20/6/2023	(Spain) Iván Ramírez (Brazil) Pablo Lima	7–6 / 4–6 / 6–7	(Spain) Arnau Ayats (Spain) Francisco Guerrero	
20/6/2023	(Argentina) Agustín Tapia (Spain) Arturo Coello	6–2 / 7–6	(Spain) Jorge Ruiz (Spain) Javier Martínez	
21/6/2023	(Spain) Jaime Muñoz (Argentina) Miguel Lamperti	6–4 / 6–3	(Spain) José Jiménez (Spain) Martín Sanchez Piñeiro	
21/6/2023	(Spain) Javier Leal (Argentina) Juan Cruz Belluati	1–6 / 0–6	(Argentina) Federico Chingotto (Spain) Paquito Navarro	
21/6/2023	(Spain) Alejandro Galán (Spain) Jon Sanz	6–4 / 6–3	(Argentina) Agustín Gutiérrez (Spain) Josete Rico	
21/6/2023	(Spain) Ignacio Vilariño (Spain) Salvador Oria	3–6 / 3–6	(Spain) Javi Rico (Argentina) Leo Augsburger	
21/6/2023	(Spain) Jairo Bautista (Argentina) Juan Martín Díaz	6–3 / 7–5	(Spain) Antón Sans (Spain) Teodoro Zapata	
21/6/2023	(Spain) Alex Ruiz (Argentina) Juan Tello	6–1 / 7–5	(Argentina) Agustín Gomez Silingo (Spain) Álvaro Cepero	
21/6/2023	(Spain) Francisco Gil (Argentina) Ramiro Moyano	2–6 / 4–6	(Spain) Mario del Castillo (Spain) Miguel Benítez	
21/6/2023	(Spain) Javier García Mora (Spain) Javier González Barahona	3–6 / 4–6	(Argentina) Franco Stupaczuk (Argentina) Martín Di Nenno	
21/6/2023	(Brazil) Lucas Campagnolo (Spain) Javi Garrido	7–6 / 4–6 / 6–3	(Spain) Momo González (Argentina) Sanyo Gutiérrez	

Women's

Date	Team A	Score	Team B	Refs.
20/6/2023	(Argentina) Aranza Osoro (Spain) Lucía Sainz	6–1 / 6–2	(Sweden) Carolina Navarro (Spain) Marina Guinart	
20/6/2023	(Spain) Águeda Pérez (Spain) Sara Ruiz	6–4 / 1–6 / 3–6	(Spain) Marina Martínez (Spain) Teresa Navarro	
20/6/2023	(Spain) Lara Arruabarrena (Spain) Sara Pujals	4–6 / 4–6	(Spain) Nuria Rodríguez (Spain) Patty Llaguno	
20/6/2023	(Spain) Esther Carnicero (Spain) Mª Carmen Villalba	6–1 / 6–3	(Spain) Alicia Blanco (Spain) Raquel Segura	
20/6/2023	(Spain) Carmen Goenaga (Spain) Lucía Martínez	4–6 / 6–4 / 6–2	(Spain) Arantxa Soriano (Spain) Sandra Bellver	
20/6/2023	(Spain) Carmen Castillón (Spain) Nuria Vivancos	7–5 / 3–6 / 6–1	(Spain) Ana Fernandez de Ossó (Spain) Laia Rodríguez	
20/6/2023	(Spain) Jessica Castelló (Portugal) Sofia Araújo	6–1 / 6–3	(Spain) Marina Pinacho (Brazil) Manuela Schuck	
20/6/2023	(Portugal) Ana Catarina Nogueira (Spain) Melania Merino	4–6 / 4–6	(Argentina) Claudia Jensen (Spain) Verónica Virseda	
21/6/2023	(Spain) Ariana Sánchez (Spain) Paula Josemaría	6–1 / 6–1	(Spain) Martina Fassio (Spain) Sandra Hernández	
21/6/2023	(Spain) Mireia Herrada (Spain) Noemí Aguilar	3–6 / 3–6	(Spain) Majo Sánchez Alayeto (Spain) Mapi Sánchez Alayeto	
21/6/2023	(Spain) Lorena Rufo (Spain) Marta Talaván	2–6 / 4–6	(Spain) Alejandra Alonso (Spain) Andrea Ustero	
21/6/2023	(Spain) Claudia Fernández (Argentina) Julieta Bidahorria	1–6 / 4–6	(Spain) Bea González (Argentina) Delfina Brea	
21/6/2023	(Spain) Tamara Icardo (Argentina) Virginia Riera	6–2 / 6–1	(Spain) Ariadna Cañellas (Spain) Carla Mesa	
21/6/2023	(Russia) Ksenia Sharifova (Spain) Marta Borrero	4–6 / 4–6	(Spain) Eli Amatriaín (Spain) Sofía Saiz	
21/6/2023	(Spain) Beatriz Caldera (France) Léa Godallier	2–6 / 4–6	(Spain) Gemma Triay (Spain) Marta Ortega	
21/6/2023	(Italy) Carlotta Casali (Spain) Jimena Velasco	6–4 / 3–6 / 2–6	(France) Alix Collombon (Spain) Victoria Iglesias	

=== Round of 16 ===
Men's

Date	Team A	Score	Team B	Refs.
22/6/2023	(Brazil) Lucas Bergamini (Spain) Víctor Ruiz	3–6 / 2–6	(Argentina) Federico Chingotto (Spain) Paquito Navarro	
22/6/2023	(Spain) Alejandro Galán (Spain) Jon Sanz	6–3 / 6–4	(Spain) Jaime Muñoz (Argentina) Miguel Lamperti	
22/6/2023	(Spain) Alex Ruiz (Argentina) Juan Tello	6–4 / 6–1	(Spain) Mario del Castillo (Spain) Miguel Benítez	
22/6/2023	(Argentina) Fernando Belasteguín (Spain) Miguel Yanguas	6–2 / 1–2 (*inj.)	(Spain) Arnau Ayats (Spain) Francisco Guerrero*	
22/6/2023	(Spain) Jairo Bautista (Spain) Juan Martín Díaz	4–6 / 3–6	(Argentina) Franco Stupaczuk (Argentina) Martín Di Nenno	
22/6/2023	(Spain) Javi Rico (Argentina) Leo Augsburger*	6–2 / 4–6 / 3–5 (*inj.)	(Brazil) Lucas Campagnolo (Spain) Javi Garrido	
22/6/2023	(Spain) Rafael Méndez (Spain) Toni Bueno	6–4 / 1–6 / 1–6	(Argentina) Lucho Capra (Argentina) Maxi Sánchez	
22/6/2023	(Argentina) Agustín Tapia (Spain) Arturo Coello	7–6 / 7–5	(Spain) Coki Nieto (Spain) Pablo Cardona	

Women's

Date	Team A	Score	Team B	Refs.
22/6/2023	(Spain) Nuria Rodríguez (Spain) Patty Llaguno	1–6 / 4–6	(Spain) Bea González (Argentina) Delfina Brea	
22/6/2023	(Argentina) Aranza Osoro (Spain) Lucía Sainz	6–1 / 6–2	(Spain) Carmen Goenaga (Spain) Lucía Martínez	
22/6/2023	(Spain) Alejandra Alonso (Spain) Andrea Ustero	6–3 / 6–1	(Spain) Majo Sánchez Alayeto (Spain) Mapi Sánchez Alayeto	
22/6/2023	(Spain) Ariana Sánchez (Spain) Paula Josemaría	7–5 / 6–4	(Spain) Esther Carnicero (Spain) Mª Carmen Villalba	
22/6/2023	(Spain) Tamara Icardo (Argentina) Virginia Riera	6–1 / 6–3	(Spain) Eli Amatriaín (Spain) Sofía Saiz	
22/6/2023	(Spain) Carmen Castillón (Spain) Nuria Vivancos	3–6 / 6–7	(Argentina) Claudia Jensen (Spain) Verónica Virseda	
22/6/2023	(France) Alix Collombon (Spain) Victoria Iglesias	4–6 / 1–6	(Spain) Gemma Triay (Spain) Marta Ortega	
22/6/2023	(Spain) Jessica Castelló (Portugal) Sofia Araújo	6–3 / 4–6 / 6–4	(Spain) Marina Martínez (Spain) Teresa Navarro	

=== Quarter-Finals ===
Men's

Date	Team A	Score	Team B	Refs.
23/6/2023	(Spain) Alejandro Galán (Spain) Jon Sanz	7–5 / 6–3	(Argentina) Federico Chingotto (Spain) Paquito Navarro	
23/6/2023	(Spain) Alex Ruiz (Argentina) Juan Tello	2–6 / 5–7	(Argentina) Franco Stupaczuk (Argentina) Martín Di Nenno	
23/6/2023	(Argentina) Fernando Belasteguín (Spain) Miguel Yanguas	3–6 / 6–7	(Brazil) Lucas Campagnolo (Spain) Javi Garrido	
23/6/2023	(Argentina) Agustín Tapia (Spain) Arturo Coello	6–3 / 4–6 / 6–2	(Argentina) Lucho Capra (Argentina) Maxi Sánchez	

Women's

Date	Team A	Score	Team B	Refs.
23/6/2023	(Spain) Ariana Sánchez (Spain) Paula Josemaría	4–6 / 6–0 / 6–4	(Spain) Alejandra Alonso (Spain) Andrea Ustero	
23/6/2023	(Argentina) Aranza Osoro (Spain) Lucía Sainz	3–6 / 1–6	(Spain) Bea González (Argentina) Delfina Brea	
23/6/2023	(Spain) Jessica Castelló (Portugal) Sofia Araújo	4–6 / 6–7	(Spain) Gemma Triay (Spain) Marta Ortega	
23/6/2023	(Spain) Tamara Icardo (Argentina) Virginia Riera	6–4 / 7–6	(Argentina) Claudia Jensen (Spain) Verónica Virseda	

=== Semi-Finals ===
Men's

Date	Team A	Score	Team B	Refs.
24/6/2023	(Spain) Alejandro Galán (Spain) Jon Sanz	6–2 / 4–6 / 1–6	(Argentina) Franco Stupaczuk (Argentina) Martín Di Nenno	
24/6/2023	(Argentina) Agustín Tapia (Spain) Arturo Coello	W.O.	(Brazil) Lucas Campagnolo (Spain) Javi Garrido*	

Women's

Date	Team A	Score	Team B	Refs.
24/6/2023	(Spain) Ariana Sánchez (Spain) Paula Josemaría	6–7 / 4–6	(Spain) Bea González (Argentina) Delfina Brea	
24/6/2023	(Spain) Tamara Icardo (Argentina) Virginia Riera	6–4 / 2–6 / 6–7	(Spain) Gemma Triay (Spain) Marta Ortega	

=== Finals ===
Men's

Date	Team A	Score	Team B	Refs.
25/6/2023	(Argentina) Agustín Tapia (Spain) Arturo Coello	6–4 / 4–6 / 6–7	(Argentina) Franco Stupaczuk (Argentina) Martín Di Nenno	

Women's

Date	Team A	Score	Team B	Refs.
25/6/2023	(Spain) Bea González (Argentina) Delfina Brea	6–2 / 5–7 / 6–2	(Spain) Gemma Triay (Spain) Marta Ortega	
