= 2023 World Padel Tour =

Tenth edition of the World Padel Tour

Details
- Duration: 21 February – 17 December
- Edition: 11th
- Tournaments: 24
- Categories: Open 500 (2); Open 1000 (17); Master (4); Masters Finals (1)

Achievements (singles)
- Most titles: Male (Argentina) Agustín Tapia (Spain) Arturo Coello (11); Female (Spain) Ariana Sánchez (Spain) Paula Josemaría (12)
- Most finals: Male (Argentina) Agustín Tapia (Spain) Arturo Coello (14); Female (shared) (Spain) Ariana Sánchez (Spain) Paula Josemaría (Spain) Gemma Triay (15)

The 2023 World Padel Tour was the eleventh and final edition of World Padel Tour, the most prestigious professional padel circuit in the world. In the male division, Agustín Tapia and Arturo Coello dethroned Alejandro Galán and Juan Lebrón to reach the number 1 spot for the first time in their careers. In the female division Ariana Sánchez and Paula Josemaría dethroned the three time number ranked Alejandra Salazar and Gemma Triay, to be crowned number one for the first time in their careers.

Held throughout 2023, it featured 26 tournaments and included both men's and women's categories. It was the most international edition of the World Padel Tour, taking place in 14 different countries across Europe, America, and Asia, surpassing the 12 countries of the previous edition.

At the beginning of the year, the updated "disciplinary regulations" and "technical regulations" were published, which came into effect starting this 2023 season.

== Schedule ==
The 2023 Calendar, revealed by WPT on January 18, incorporated several new features compared to previous editions. The "Open" category was divided into two, "Open 1000" and "Open 500", the number referring to the amount of ranking points that each member of the winning pair gets (the old "Open" is therefore equivalent to the current "Open 1000").

For the first time, Finland hosted an Open tournament, although in the previous year an exhibition was held in Tampere. The "American tour" in March is also noteworthy; three consecutive weeks of tournaments in countries across the Americas, specifically Argentina, Chile, and Paraguay, in the cities of La Rioja, Santiago, and Asunción, all making their debut on the tour. Some European cities that hosted an Open in the previous year, such as Amsterdam, Brussels, Copenhagen and Malmö remained on the calendar. Two new countries have also been added to the calendar; the first in Abu Dhabi, in the United Arab Emirates, and at the beginning of autumn an Open 1000 in Germany.

A total of five tournaments, four Opens and the Marbella Master we're held consecutively from May 1 to June 4.

There we're four tournaments in the new "Open 500" category, which we're hosted in Reus, Alicante Santander and Albacete.

With the return of an Open in Granada, a tournament that hadn't been held since the 2018 World Padel Tour, Andalusia became the autonomous community or region with the most tournaments in a year, with a total of three.

To end the year, Barcelona and the Palau Sant Jordi we're selected to host the 2023 Master Final again, after breaking the all-time attendance record for a padel match (12,141 spectators), in the semi-finals of the Barcelona Master Final.

=== Changes ===
Initially, the official calendar was supposed to be revealed before the end of the 2022. On November 7th of that year, World Padel Tour announced that "in the coming days, no later than the Estrella Damm Master Final taking place in Barcelona between December 15th and 18th, the World Padel Tour will unveil the rest of the 2023 calendar." Finally, on January 18, 2023, exactly one month after the conclusion of the aforementioned tournament, the WPT published the calendar for the upcoming season, although without the Challenger events, the Challenger Final and exhibitions.

Three tournaments from the previous edition weren't held this year. The Miami and Sardinia Opens, whcich were dropped from the calendar, as the tournament in Portugal, which was a regular feature in recent WPT editions.

First modification, on February 10th the first changes to the calendar are announced:

- Logistical difficulties have caused the Stockholm Open, which was scheduled to take place from April 17 to 23, to be postponed to 2024.
- The new 'Open 500' in Albacete is announced, to be held from June 6th to 11th.
- Three tournaments changed dates. The Madrid Master is delayed by one week and the Santander Open and the Menorca Open have swapped positions on the calendar.
- The color of the "Open 500" tournaments is changed from light blue to orange, the color that, until then, represented the "Challenger" tournaments, so it was implied that the Open 500 tournaments were going to replace them.

It was initially agreed that the season would start with an Open in Mallorca, a tournament that had not been held since 2016 and was going to use the facilities of the "Rafa Nadal Academy", but on January 12, the World Padel Tour announced, without explanation, that the opening tournament would be the Abu Dhabi Master. Six days later the calendar was published, without the tournament in Mallorca.

Due to the constant struggle to equalize prize money in both the men's and women's categories, the Buenos Aires Master, one of the most important tournaments of the year, didn't have a women's category tournament.

== Tournaments and results ==
Open 500 Open 1000 Master Master Final

Tournament	Date	Men's			Women's		
Tournament	Date	Winners	Score	Runners-up	Winners	Score	Runners-up
(United Arab Emirates) Abu Dhabi Master	20 – 26 February	(Argentina) Agustín Tapia (Spain) Arturo Coello	7–6 / 6–3	(Spain) Alejandro Galán (Spain) Juan Lebrón	(Spain) Ariana Sánchez (Spain) Paula Josemaría	6–3 / 6–3	(Spain) Alejandra Salazar (Spain) Gemma Triay
(Argentina) La Rioja Open 1000	6 – 12 March	(Argentina) Agustín Tapia (Spain) Arturo Coello	6–1 / 6–0	(Argentina) Leandro Augsburger (Argentina) Valentino Libaak	(Spain) Alejandra Salazar (Spain) Gemma Triay	6–7 / 6–4 / 6–1	(Spain) Bea González (Spain) Marta Ortega
Chile Open 1000	13 – 19 March	(Argentina) Agustín Tapia (Spain) Arturo Coello	6–4 / 6–7 / 7–5 (Note: This is the "official" result, as the match should have ended with a victory for Tapia and Coello by 6-4 / 6-3)	(Spain) Alejandro Galán (Spain) Juan Lebrón	(Spain) Alejandra Salazar (Spain) Gemma Triay	6–1 / 1–0 / WO	(Argentina) Claudia Jensen (Spain) Jessica Castelló
Paraguay Open 1000	20 – 26 March	(Argentina) Agustín Tapia (Spain) Arturo Coello	6–2 / 6–1	(Argentina) Franco Stupaczuk (Argentina) Martin Di Nenno	(Spain) Alejandra Salazar (Spain) Gemma Triay	7–6 / 7–6	(Spain) Ariana Sánchez (Spain) Paula Josemaría
(Spain) Reus Open 500	27 March – 2 April	(Spain) Mike Yanguas (Spain) Momo González	6–3 / 7–6	(Spain) José Diestro (Spain) Pincho Fernández	(Spain) Ariana Sánchez (Spain) Paula Josemaría	6–3 / 6–2	(Spain) Alejandra Salazar (Spain) Gemma Triay
(Spain) Granada Open 1000	10 – 16 April	(Argentina) Agustín Tapia (Spain) Arturo Coello	6–4 / 7–5	(Argentina) Franco Stupaczuk (Argentina) Martin Di Nenno	(Spain) Ariana Sánchez (Spain) Paula Josemaría	6–2 / 7–6	(Spain) Alejandra Salazar (Spain) Gemma Triay
(Sweden) Stockolm Open 1000	~~17 – 23 April~~	Cancelled			Cancelled		
(Belgium) Brussels Open 1000	24 – 30 April	(Argentina) Agustín Tapia (Spain) Arturo Coello	7–6 / 3–6 / 6–3	(Argentina) Franco Stupaczuk (Argentina) Martin Di Nenno	(Spain) Ariana Sánchez (Spain) Paula Josemaría	6–7 / 6–3 / 7–5	(Spain) Alejandra Salazar (Spain) Gemma Triay
(Spain) Alicante Open 500	1 – 7 May	(Spain) Eduardo Alonso (Spain) Juanlu Esbrí	2–6 / 6–4 / 6–4	(Spain) Gonzalo Rubio (Spain) Javier Ruiz	(Spain) Marta Ortega (Portugal) Sofia Araújo	7–6 / 7–6	(Spain) Tamara Icardo (Argentina) Virginia Riera
(Spain) Vigo Open 1000	8 – 14 May	(Argentina) Agustín Tapia (Spain) Arturo Coello	6–3 / 6–7 / 7–6	(Spain) Alejandro Galán (Spain) Juan Lebrón	(Spain) Ariana Sánchez (Spain) Paula Josemaría	6–2 / 6–3	(Spain) Alejandra Salazar (Spain) Gemma Triay
(Denmark) Danish Open 1000	17 – 21 May	(Argentina) Franco Stupaczuk (Argentina) Martin Di Nenno	6–3 / 6–2	(Spain) Momo González (Argentina) Sanyo Gutiérrez	(Spain) Bea González (Argentina) Delfina Brea	6–2 / 3–6 / 6–4	(Spain) Alejandra Salazar (Spain) Gemma Triay
(Austria) Vienna Open 1000	22 – 28 May	(Argentina) Agustín Tapia (Spain) Arturo Coello	6–3 / 6–3	(Argentina) Franco Stupaczuk (Argentina) Martin Di Nenno	(Spain) Ariana Sánchez (Spain) Paula Josemaría	6–3 / 6–1	(Spain) Bea González (Argentina) Delfina Brea
(Spain) Marbella Master	29 May – 4 June	(Argentina) Agustín Tapia (Spain) Arturo Coello	6–3 / 6–2	(Spain) Momo González (Argentina) Sanyo Gutiérrez	(Spain) Ariana Sánchez (Spain) Paula Josemaría	6–1 / 6–4	(Spain) Tamara Icardo (Argentina) Virginia Riera
(Spain) Albacete Open 500	~~6 June – 11 June~~	Cancelled			Cancelled		
France Open 1000	12 – 18 June	(Argentina) Franco Stupaczuk (Argentina) Martin Di Nenno	6–2 / 6–4	(Argentina) Federico Chingotto (Spain) Paquito Navarro	(Spain) Ariana Sánchez (Spain) Paula Josemaría	6–1 / 4–6 / 7–6	(Spain) Bea González (Argentina) Delfina Brea
(Spain) Valladolid Master	17 – 25 June	(Argentina) Franco Stupaczuk (Argentina) Martin Di Nenno	4–6 / 6–4 / 7–6	(Argentina) Agustín Tapia (Spain) Arturo Coello	(Spain) Bea González (Argentina) Delfina Brea	6–2 / 5–7 / 6–2	(Spain) Gemma Triay (Spain) Marta Ortega
(Spain) Valencia Open 1000	3 – 9 July	(Argentina) Franco Stupaczuk (Argentina) Martin Di Nenno	6–3 / 6–3	(Spain) Alejandro Galán (Spain) Jon Sanz	(Spain) Ariana Sánchez (Spain) Paula Josemaría	6–3 / 6–1	(Spain) Gemma Triay (Spain) Marta Ortega
(Spain) Málaga Open 1000	24 – 30 July	(Argentina) Agustín Tapia (Spain) Arturo Coello	7–5 / 7–6	(Spain) Alejandro Ruiz (Argentina) Juan Tello	(Spain) Ariana Sánchez (Spain) Paula Josemaría	6–4 / 6–3	(Spain) Gemma Triay (Spain) Marta Ortega
Finland Open 1000	28 August – 3 September	(Spain) Alejandro Galán (Spain) Juan Lebrón	6–0 / 7–6	(Spain) Coki Nieto (Spain) Jon Sanz	(Spain) Bea González (Argentina) Delfina Brea	6–4 / 6–1	(Spain) Alejandra Salazar (Portugal) Sofia Araújo
(Spain) Madrid Master	19 – 24 September	(Argentina) Franco Stupaczuk (Argentina) Martin Di Nenno	7–5 / 6–4	(Argentina) Agustín Tapia (Spain) Arturo Coello	(Spain) Ariana Sánchez (Spain) Paula Josemaría	6–3 / 7–6	(Spain) Gemma Triay (Spain) Marta Ortega
Germany Open 1000	25 September – 1 October	(Spain) Alejandro Galán (Spain) Juan Lebrón	6–2 / 6–2	(Argentina) Franco Stupaczuk (Argentina) Martin Di Nenno	(Spain) Ariana Sánchez (Spain) Paula Josemaría	6–3 / 7–6	(Spain) Gemma Triay (Spain) Marta Ortega
(Netherlands) Amsterdam Open 1000	9 – 15 October	(Argentina) Franco Stupaczuk (Argentina) Martin Di Nenno	4–6 / 6–2 / 6–2	(Argentina) Federico Chingotto (Spain) Paquito Navarro	(Spain) Ariana Sánchez (Spain) Paula Josemaría	7–6 / 6–0	(Spain) Bea González (Argentina) Delfina Brea
(Spain) Santander Open 500	~~23 – 29 October~~	Cancelled			Cancelled		
(Spain) Menorca Open 1000	17 October – 22 October	(Spain) Alejandro Galán (Spain) Juan Lebrón	6–3 / 6–2	(Argentina) Agustín Tapia (Spain) Arturo Coello	(Spain) Gemma Triay (Spain) Marta Ortega	6–4 / 4–6 / 6–4	(Spain) Ariana Sánchez (Spain) Paula Josemaría
(Sweden) Malmö Open 1000	6 – 12 November	(Spain) Alejandro Galán (Spain) Juan Lebrón	6–3 / 6–4	(Argentina) Franco Stupaczuk (Argentina) Martin Di Nenno	(Spain) Bea González (Argentina) Delfina Brea	6–4 / 6–3	(Spain) Alejandra Salazar (Portugal) Sofia Araújo
(Argentina) Buenos Aires Master	~~13 – 19 November~~	Cancelled			Cancelled		
Mexico Open 1000	20 – 26 November	(Argentina) Agustín Tapia (Spain) Arturo Coello	6–4 / 6–2	(Argentina) Leandro Augsburger (Argentina) Valentino Libaak	(Spain) Bea González (Argentina) Delfina Brea	6–4 / 6–2	(Spain) Tamara Icardo (Argentina) Virginia Riera
(Spain) Barcelona Master Final	14 – 17 December	(Argentina) Federico Chingotto (Spain) Paquito Navarro	6–1 / 6–4	(Spain) Alejandro Galán (Spain) Juan Lebrón	(Spain) Bea González (Argentina) Delfina Brea	6–4 / 6–1	(Argentina) Aranza Osoro (Spain) Jessica Castelló

== End of season ranking ==
Male

2023 Men's Ranking			Tournaments Won			
N.º	Name	Points	Open	Master	Master Final	Total
1	(Argentina) Agustín Tapia	17.745	9	2	0	11
1	(Spain) Arturo Coello	17.745	9	2	0	11
3	(Argentina) Martín Di Nenno	15.410	4	2	0	6
3	(Argentina) Franco Stupaczuk	15.410	4	2	0	6
5	(Spain) Alejandro Galán	10.510	4	0	0	4
6	(Spain) Juan Lebrón	8.470	4	0	0	4
7	(Argentina) Fede Chingotto	8.060	0	0	1	1
8	(Spain) Paquito Navarro	7.390	0	0	1	1
9	(Spain) Momo González	6.095	0	0	0	0
10	(Spain) Jon Sanz	5.825	0	0	0	0
11	(Spain) Alejandro Ruiz	5.360	0	0	0	0
12	(Argentina) Sanyo Gutiérrez	5.200	0	0	0	0
13	(Spain) Javi Garrido	4.835	0	0	0	0
14	(Argentina) Juan Tello	4.800	0	0	0	0
15	(Spain) Mike Yanguas	3.940	0	0	0	0
16	(Spain) Coki Nieto	3.735	0	0	0	0

Female

2023 Women's Ranking			Tournaments Won			
N.º	Name	Points	Open	Master	Master Final	Total
1	(Spain) Ariana Sánchez	19.220	9	3	0	12
1	(Spain) Paula Josemaría	19.220	9	3	0	12
3	(Spain) Gemma Triay	14.890	4	0	0	4
4	(Spain) Beatriz González	13.680	4	1	1	6
5	(Argentina) Delfi Brea	13.360	4	1	1	6
6	(Spain) Marta Ortega	11.160	1	0	0	1
7	(Spain) Alejandra Salazar	10.170	3	0	0	3
8	(Spain) Tamara Icardo	8.177	0	0	0	0
8	(Argentina) Virginia Riera	8.177	0	0	0	0
10	(Portugal) Sofia Araújo	6.785	0	0	0	0
11	(Argentina) Claudia Jensen	6.447	0	0	0	0
12	(Spain) Jessica Castelló	6.392	0	0	0	0
13	(Argentina) Aranzazu Osoro	5.565	0	0	0	0
14	(Spain) Lucía Sainz	4.685	0	0	0	0
15	(Spain) Verónica Virseda	4.410	0	0	0	0
15	(Spain) Mapi Sánchez Alayeto	4.110	0	0	0	0
