= 2023 Brussels Open =

Padel championships

- Date: 25 April – 30 April
- Edition: 2nd
- Category: Open 1000
- Location: Brussels, Belgium
- Venue: Tour & Taxis

Champions
- Men's doubles: (Argentina) Agustín Tapia (Spain) Arturo Coello
- Women's doubles: (Spain) Ariana Sánchez (Spain) Paula Josemaría

Chronology

The WPT Brussels Open 2023 (officially WPT Circus Brussels Padel Open 1000 2023) was the sixth tournament of the eleventh edition of World Padel Tour. The final phase was played between April 25 and 30, 2023 at the facilities of the Tour & Taxis in Brussels, Belgium, while the preliminary phase was played between March 22 and 24.

In the women's category, Ariana Sánchez and Paula Josemaría defeated Alejandra Salazar and Gemma Triay for the third consecutive time, 6–7, 6–3, 7–5, in what was now the most repeated final in World Padel Tour history. The match was very close, with almost 200 points played and lasting over three hours. It was Gemma and Ale's 12th consecutive final.

In the men's category, Agustín Tapia and Arturo Coello secured their sixth title in WPT, out of a possible six, extending their winning streak to 27 matches. They defeated the "Superpibes" Franco Stupaczuk and Martín Di Nenno 7–6, 3–6, 6–3 in a closely contested final. The score was tied at 88-88, and although the Argentinians generated twice as many break points, the "Golden Boys" won the majority of the golden points, thus tipping the scales in their favor.

== Registered teams ==
Male

| Rnk. | Team | WPT Ranking Points |
|---|---|---|
| 1 | (Argentina) Agustín Tapia (Spain) Arturo Coello | 28.995 |
| 2 | (Argentina) Franco Stupaczuk (Argentina) Martín Di Nenno | 17.905 |
| 3 | (Spain) Momo González (Argentina) Sanyo Gutiérrez | 15.370 |
| 4 | (Argentina) Federico Chingotto (Spain) Paquito Navarro | 13.390 |
| 5 | (Spain) Alex Ruiz (Argentina) Juan Tello | 12.795 |
| 6 | (Argentina) Fernando Belasteguín (Spain) Miguel Yanguas | 12.262 |
| 7 | (Spain) Coki Nieto (Brazil) Pablo Lima | 10.546 |
| 8 | (Brazil) Lucas Campagnolo (Argentina) Maxi Sánchez | 7.505 |
| 9 | (Spain) Javi Garrido (Spain) Jon Sanz | 6.828 |
| 10 | (Spain) Alejandro Arroyo (Argentina) Lucho Capra | 6.550 |
| 11 | (Spain) José García Diestro (Spain) Pincho Fernández | 6.294 |
| 12 | (Spain) Gonzalo Rubio (Spain) Javier Ruiz | 5.649 |
| 13 | (Spain) Francisco Gil (Argentina) Ramiro Moyano | 4.769 |
| 14 | (Argentina) Agustín Gutiérrez (Spain) Josete Rico | 4.595 |
| 15 | (Brazil) Lucas Bergamini (Spain) Víctor Ruiz | 3.931 |
| 16 | (Argentina) Miguel Lamperti (Argentina) Valentino Libaak | 3.905 |
| 17 | (Spain) Javier Leal (Argentina) Juan Cruz Belluati | 3.774 |
| 18 | (Spain) Eduardo Alonso (Spain) Juanlu Esbri | 3.533 |
| 19 | (Spain) Javier García Mora (Spain) Javier González Barahona | 3.439 |
| 20 | (Spain) Iván Ramírez (Spain) Pablo Cardona | 3.159 |
| 21 | (Spain) Javi Rico (Argentina) Leo Augsburger | 3.035 |
| 22 | (Spain) Marc Quílez (Spain) Toni Bueno | 3.020 |
| 23 | (Argentina) Agustín Gomez Silingo (Argentina) Juan Martín Díaz | 2.991 |
| 24 | (Spain) Josete Rico (Spain) Salvador Oria | 2.757 |
| 25 | (Spain) Ignacio Vilariño (Spain) Jaime Muñoz | 2.733 |
| LL | (Spain) Martín Sanchéz Piñeiro (Spain) Cristian G. Gutiérrez | 1.550 |
| WC | (Belgium) Clément Geens (Belgium) Maxime Deloyer | 25 |
| WC | (Belgium) François Azzola (Belgium) Jérôme Peeters | 0 |
Qualified from the preliminary rounds
| A | (Spain) Antón Sans (Spain) Teodoro Zapata | 2.470 |
| B | (Spain) Jose Jiménez Casas (Spain) Jesús Moya | 1.815 |
| C | (Spain) Arnau Ayats (Spain) Francisco Guerrero | 1.387 |
| D | (Spain) Mario del Castillo (Spain) Miguel Benítez | 2.452 |

Female

| Rnk. | Team | WPT Ranking Points |
|---|---|---|
| 1 | (Spain) Ariana Sánchez (Spain) Paula Josemaría | 36.070 |
| 2 | (Spain) Alejandra Salazar (Spain) Gemma Triay | 36.060 |
| 3 | (Spain) Bea González (Argentina) Delfina Brea | 13.144 |
| 4 | (Spain) Marta Ortega (Portugal) Sofia Araújo | 12.530 |
| 5 | (Argentina) Aranza Osoro (Spain) Lucía Sainz | 11.622 |
| 6 | (Spain) Patty Llaguno (Spain) Victoria Iglesias | 11.308 |
| 7 | (Spain) Tamara Icardo (Argentina) Virginia Riera | 10.589 |
| 8 | (Spain) Majo Sánchez Alayeto (Spain) Mapi Sánchez Alayeto | 8.965 |
| 9 | (Argentina) Claudia Jensen (Spain) Jessica Castelló | 8.635 |
| 10 | (Spain) Beatriz Caldera (Spain) Verónica Virseda | 6.651 |
| 11 | (Spain) Lorena Rufo (Spain) Marta Talaván | 5.055 |
| 12 | (Spain) Carla Mesa (Spain) Esther Carnicero | 4.458 |
| 13 | (Spain) Mª Carmen Villalba (Spain) Nuria Rodríguez | 3.728 |
| 14 | (Spain) Alejandra Alonso (France) Alix Collombon | 3.557 |
| 15 | (Sweden) Carolina Navarro (Spain) Marina Guinart | 3.544 |
| 16 | (Spain) Claudia Fernández (Argentina) Julieta Bidahorria | 3.442 |
| 17 | (Spain) Lucía Martínez (Spain) Marta Barrera | 3.392 |
| 18 | (Spain) Carmen Goenaga (Spain) Marta Caparrós | 3.271 |
| 19 | (Portugal) Ana Catarina Nogueira (Spain) Melania Merino | 2.929 |
| 20 | (Spain) Eli Amatriaín (Spain) Sofía Saiz | 2.846 |
| 21 | (Spain) Araceli Martínez (Spain) Noa Cánovas | 2.836 |
| 22 | (Spain) Marina Martínez (Spain) Teresa Navarro | 2.794 |
| 23 | (Italy) Carolina Orsi (France) Léa Godallier | 2.760 |
| WC | (Belgium) An-Sophie Mestach (Belgium) Helena Wyckaert | 366 |
Qualified from the preliminary rounds
| A | (Spain) Arantxa Soriano (Spain) Sandra Bellver | 2.390 |
| B | (Spain) Jimena Velasco (Spain) Sara Pujals | 2.041 |
| C | (Italy) Giulia Sussarello (Spain) Sandra Hernández | 2.212 |
| D | (Spain) Águeda Pérez (Spain) Sara Ruiz | 2.243 |

Teams missing

| Rnk. | Teams | WPT Ranking Points | Reason |
|---|---|---|---|
| 1 | (Spain) Alejandro Galán (Spain) Juan Lebrón | 32.830 | (Note: Just before the start of the tournament, and despite being registered, Lebron announced that he would ultimately be unable to compete because he had not fully recovered from his injury.) |

== Schedule ==
The matches begin on Saturday with the qualifying rounds:

- Saturday 22nd: Men's Qualifying Round 1.
- Sunday 23rd: Men's Qualifying Round 2.
- Monday 24th: Men's Qualifying Round 3 and Women's Qualifying Rounds 1 and 2.

The main draw was played two weeks later:

- Tuesday 25th: Round of 32 and final women's qualifying round.
- Wednesday 26th: Round of 32.
- Thursday 27th: Round of 16.
- Friday 28th: Quarterfinals.
- Saturday 29th: Semifinals.
- Sunday 30th: Finals.

== Results ==
=== Men's Bracket ===
Round of 32
1 | (Argentina) Tapia / (Spain) Coello | 6 | 6
(Belgium) C. Geens / (Belgium) M. Deloyer (WC) | 1 | 2
20 | (Spain) Iván R. / (Spain) Cardona | 6 | 6
9 | (Spain) Garrido / (Spain) Sanz | 7 | 2
22 | (Spain) Quílez / (Spain) Bueno | 6 | 1 | 4
(Spain) C.G. Gutiérrez / (Spain) Piñeiro (LL) | 3 | 6 | 6
13 | (Spain) Gil / (Argentina) Moyano | 4 | 2
7 | (Spain) Coki / (Brazil) Lima | 6 | 6
8 | (Brazil) Campagnolo / (Argentina) Maxi | 2 | 6 | 3
10 | (Spain) Arroyo / (Argentina) Capra | 6 | 3 | 6
25 | (Spain) Vilariño / (Spain) Muñoz | 4 | 6 | 6
14 | (Argentina) A. Gutiérrez / (Spain) J. Rico | 6 | 3 | 3
23 | (Argentina) Silingo / (Spain) J.M. Díaz
12 | (Spain) Rubio / (Spain) Ruiz
24 | (Spain) Rico / (Spain) Oria | 0 | 0
4 | (Argentina) Chingotto / (Spain) Paquito | 6 | 6
3 | (Spain) Momo / (Argentina) Sanyo | 6 | 6
(Belgium) Azzola / (Belgium) Peeters (WC) | 2 | 2
16 | (Argentina) Lamperti / (Argentina) Libaak | 3 | 6 | 5
(Spain) Sans / (Spain) Zapata (A) | 6 | 4 | 7
(Spain) Ayats / (Spain) Guerrero (C) | 4 | 6 | 6
17 | (Spain) Leal / (Argentina) Belluati | 6 | 3 | 3
(Spain) Casas / (Spain) Moya (B) | 2 | 6
5 | (Spain) A. Ruiz / (Argentina) Tello | 6 | 7
6 | (Argentina) Belasteguín / (Spain) Yanguas | 6 | 6
(Spain) Castillo / (Spain) M. Benítez (D) | 4 | 3
15 | (Brazil) Bergamini / (Spain) V. Ruiz | 7 | 6
19 | (Spain) Mora / (Spain) Barahona | 5 | 4
21 | (Spain) Javi Rico / (Argentina) Augsburger | 6 | 7 | 4
11 | (Spain) Diestro / (Spain) P. Fernández | 7 | 6 | 6
18 | (Spain) E. Alonso / (Spain) Esbri | 3 | 4
2 | (Argentina) Stupaczuk / (Argentina) Di Nenno | 6 | 6

Round of 16
1 | (Argentina) Tapia / (Spain) Coello | 6 | 6
20 | (Spain) Garrido / (Spain) Sanz | 3 | 3
(Spain) C.G. Gutiérrez / (Spain) Piñeiro (LL) | 2 | 0
7 | (Spain) Coki / (Brazil) Lima | 6 | 6
10 | (Spain) Arroyo / (Argentina) Capra | 3 | 7 | 5
14 | (Argentina) A. Gutiérrez / (Spain) J. Rico | 6 | 6 | 7
12 | (Spain) Rubio / (Spain) J. Ruiz | 3 | 3
4 | (Argentina) Chingotto / (Spain) Paquito | 6 | 6
3 | (Spain) Momo / (Argentina) Sanyo | 6 | 7
(Spain) Sans / (Spain) Zapata (A) | 1 | 6
(Spain) Ayats / (Spain) Guerrero (C) | 3 | 6 | 2
5 | (Spain) A. Ruiz / (Argentina) Tello | 6 | 2 | 6
6 | (Argentina) Belasteguín / (Spain) Yanguas | 4 | 6 | 6
15 | (Brazil) Bergamini / (Spain) Víctor Ruiz | 6 | 2 | 1
11 | (Spain) Diestro / (Spain) P. Fernández | 1 | 0
2 | (Argentina) Stupaczuk / (Argentina) Di Nenno | 6 | 6

Quarter-Final
1 | (Argentina) Tapia / (Spain) Coello | 6 | 6
7 | (Spain) Coki / (Brazil) Lima | 0 | 2
14 | (Argentina) A. Gutiérrez / (Spain) J. Rico | 3 | 1
4 | (Argentina) Chingotto / (Spain) Paquito | 6 | 6
3 | (Spain) Momo / (Argentina) Sanyo | 6 | 7
5 | (Spain) A. Ruiz / (Argentina) Tello | 1 | 6
6 | (Argentina) Belasteguín / (Spain) Yanguas | 3 | 2
2 | (Argentina) Stupaczuk / (Argentina) Di Nenno | 6 | 6

Semi-Finals
1 | (Argentina) Tapia / (Spain) Coello | 6 | 6
4 | (Argentina) Chingotto / (Spain) Paquito | 2 | 4
3 | (Spain) Momo / (Argentina) Sanyo | 6 | 0 | 6
2 | (Argentina) Stupaczuk / (Argentina) Di Nenno | 4 | 6 | 7

Finals
1 | (Argentina) Tapia / (Spain) Coello | 7 | 3 | 6
2 | (Argentina) Stupaczuk / (Argentina) Di Nenno | 6 | 6 | 3

=== Women's Bracket ===
Round of 32
1 | (Spain) A. Sánchez / (Spain) P. Josemaria
Bye
(Spain) Jimena V. / (Spain) S. Pujals (B) | 2 | 4
12 | (Spain) C. Mesa / (Spain) E. Carnicero | 6 | 6
17 | (Spain) Lucía M. / (Spain) M. Barrera | 6 | 4 | 7
11 | (Spain) Lorena R. / (Spain) M. Talaván | 4 | 6 | 6
9 | (Argentina) C. Jensen / (Spain) J. Castelló | 6 | 7
8 | (Spain) Majo / (Spain) Mapi | 3 | 5
7 | (Spain) T. Icardo / (Argentina) Virginia R. | 6 | 6
22 | (Spain) M. Martínez / (Spain) T. Navarro | 2 | 1
10 | (Spain) B. Caldera / (Spain) V. Virseda | 7 | 6
21 | (Spain) A. Martínez / (Spain) N. Cánovas | 5 | 2
20 | (Spain) E. Amatriaín / (Spain) S. Saiz | 6 | 3 | 6
19 | (Portugal) A.C. Nogueira / (Spain) M. Merino | 1 | 6 | 4
Bye
4 | (Spain) M. Ortega / (Portugal) S. Araújo
3 | (Spain) Bea G. / (Argentina) D. Brea
Bye
14 | (Spain) A. Alonso / (France) A. Collombon | 6 | 6
(Italy) G. Sussarello / (Spain) S. Hernández (C) | 2 | 0
18 | (Spain) C. Goenaga / (Spain) M. Caparrós | 7 | 6
23 | (Italy) C. Orsi / (France) L. Godallier | 6 | 2
(Belgium) A.S. Mestach / (Belgium) H. Wyckaert (WC) | 1 | 3
6 | (Spain) P. Llaguno / (Spain) V. Iglesias | 6 | 6
5 | (Argentina) A. Osoro / (Spain) L. Sainz | 6 | 7
(Spain) A. Pérez / (Spain) S. Ruiz (D) | 2 | 5
(Spain) A. Soriano / (Spain) S. Bellver (A) | 6 | 7
16 | (Spain) C. Fernández / (Argentina) J. Bidahorria | 3 | 5
13 | (Spain) N. Rodríguez / (Spain) M.C. Villalba | 1 | 6 | 3
15 | (Sweden) C. Navarro / (Spain) M. Guinart | 6 | 3 | 6
Bye
2 | (Spain) A. Salazar / (Spain) G. Triay

Round of 16
1 | (Spain) A. Sánchez / (Spain) P. Josemaría | 3 | 6 | 6
12 | (Spain) C. Mesa / (Spain) E. Carnicero | 6 | 3 | 1
17 | (Spain) L. Martínez / (Spain) M. Barrera | 3 | 6 | 3
9 | (Argentina) C. Jensen / (Spain) J. Castelló | 6 | 3 | 6
7 | (Spain) T. Icardo / (Argentina) V. Riera | 7 | 7
10 | (Spain) B. Caldera / (Spain) V. Virseda | 5 | 5
20 | (Spain) E. Amatriaín / (Spain) S. Saiz | 0 | 3
4 | (Spain) M. Ortega / (Portugal) S. Araújo | 6 | 6
3 | (Spain) Bea G. / (Argentina) D. Brea | 6 | 6
14 | (Spain) A. Alonso / (France) A.Collombon | 3 | 0
18 | (Spain) C. Goenaga / (Spain) M. Caparrós | 4 | 7 | 6
6 | (Spain) V. Iglesias / (Spain) P. Llaguno | 6 | 6 | 4
5 | (Argentina) A. Osoro / (Spain) L. Sainz | 6 | 6
16 | (Spain) C. Fernández / (Argentina) J. Bidahorria | 4 | 3
15 | (Sweden) C. Navarro / (Spain) M. Guinart | 3 | 4
2 | (Spain) A. Salazar / (Spain) G. Triay | 6 | 6

Quarter-Final
1 | (Spain) A. Sánchez / (Spain) P. Josemaría | 6 | 6
9 | (Spain) J. Castelló / (Argentina) C. Jensen | 2 | 4
7 | (Spain) T. Icardo / (Argentina) V. Riera | 3 | 6
4 | (Spain) M. Ortega / (Portugal) S. Araújo | 6 | 7
3 | (Spain) Bea G. / (Argentina) D. Brea | 6 | 6
18 | (Spain) C. Goenaga / (Spain) M. Caparrós | 1 | 4
5 | (Argentina) A. Osoro / (Spain) L. Sainz | 6 | 2 | 3
2 | (Spain) A. Salazar / (Spain) G. Triay | 4 | 6 | 6

Semi-Finals
1 | (Spain) A. Sánchez / (Spain) P. Josemaría | 4 | 6 | 7
4 | (Spain) M. Ortega / (Portugal) S. Araújo | 6 | 1 | 6
3 | (Spain) Bea G. / (Argentina) D. Brea | 2 | 6
2 | (Spain) A. Salazar / (Spain) G. Triay | 6 | 7

Finals
(Spain) A. Sánchez / (Spain) P. Josemaría | 6 | 6 | 7
(Spain) A. Salazar / (Spain) G. Triay | 7 | 3 | 5

=== Final qualifying round ===
Men's

| Data | Qualified | WPT Ranking Point | Opponents | Result |
|---|---|---|---|---|
| A | (Spain) Antón Sans (Spain) Teodoro Zapata | 2.470 vs 1.652 | (Sweden) Daniel Windahl (Spain) José Solano | 6–3 / 2–6 / 7–6 |
| B | (Spain) Jesús Moya (Spain) Jose Jiménez Casas | 1.815 vs 1.550 | (Argentina) Cristian G. Gutiérrez (Spain) Martín Sanchéz Piñeiro | 7–6 / 7–6 |
| C | (Spain) Arnau Ayats (Spain) Francisco Guerrero | 1.387 vs 1.913 | (Spain) Javier Martínez (Spain) Rafael Méndez | 3–6 / 7–6 / 6–3 |
| D | (Spain) Mario del Castillo (Spain) Miguel Benítez | 2.452 vs 1.655 | (Spain) Enrique Goenaga (Spain) Jairo Bautista | 6–3 / 6–4 |

Women's

| Data | Qualified | WPT Ranking Point | Opponents | Result |
|---|---|---|---|---|
| A | (Spain) Arantxa Soriano (Spain) Sandra Bellver | 2.390 vs 1.672 | (Spain) Ana Fernandez De Ossó (Spain) Mª Eulalia Rodríguez | 6–2 / 6–2 |
| B | (Spain) Jimena Velasco (Spain) Sara Pujals | 2.041 vs 847 | (Spain) Ana Varo (Spain) Nicole Traviesa | 6–2 / 6–2 |
| C | (Italy) Giulia Sussarello (Spain) Sandra Hernández | 2.212 vs 1.616 | (Spain) Alicia Blanco (Spain) Lara Arruabarrera | 6–4 / 6–3 |
| Letra D | (Spain) Águeda Pérez (Spain) Sara Ruiz | 2.243 vs 1.373 | (Spain) Carlotta Casali (Spain) Marta Borrero | 6–4 / 3–6 / 6–2 |

=== Round of 32 ===
Men's

| Date | Team A | Score | Team B | Refs. |
|---|---|---|---|---|
| 25/4/2023 | (Spain) Iván Ramírez (Spain) Pablo Cardona | 6–7 / 2–6 | (Spain) Javi Garrido (Spain) Jon Sanz | |
| 25/4/2023 | (Spain) Arnau Ayats (Spain) Francisco Guerrero | 4–6 / 6–3 / 6–3 | (Spain) Javier Leal (Argentina) Juan Cruz Belluati | |
| 25/4/2023 | (Argentina) Miguel Lamperti (Argentina) Valentino Libaak | 3–6 / 6–4 / 5–7 | (Spain) Antón Sans (Spain) Teodoro Zapata | |
| 25/4/2023 | (Spain) Ignacio Vilariño (Spain) Jaime Muñoz | 6–4 / 3–6 / 3–6 | (Argentina) Agustín Gutiérrez (Spain) Josete Rico | |
| 25/4/2023 | (Spain) Javi Rico (Argentina) Leo Augsburger | 6–7 / 7–6 / 4–6 | (Spain) José García Diestro (Spain) Pincho Fernández | |
| 25/4/2023 | (Brazil) Lucas Bergamini (Spain) Víctor Ruiz | 7–5 / 6–4 | (Spain) Javier García Mora (Spain) Javier González Barahona | |
| 26/4/2023 | (Spain) Eduardo Alonso (Spain) Juanlu Esbri | 3–6 / 4–6 | (Argentina) Franco Stupaczuk (Argentina) Martín Di Nenno | |
| 26/4/2023 | (Spain) Jose Jiménez Casas (Spain) Jesús Moya | 2–6 / 6–7 | (Spain) Alex Ruiz (Argentina) Juan Tello | |
| 26/4/2023 | (Argentina) Fernando Belasteguín (Spain) Miguel Yanguas | 6–4 / 6–3 | (Spain) Mario del Castillo (Spain) Miguel Benítez | |
| 26/4/2023 | (Spain) Momo González (Argentina) Sanyo Gutiérrez | 6–2 / 6–2 | (Belgium) François Azzola (Belgium) Jérôme Peeters | |
| 26/4/2023 | (Argentina) Agustín Gomez Silingo (Spain) Juan Martín Díaz | 4–6 / 4–6 | (Spain) Gonzalo Rubio (Spain) Javier Ruiz | |
| 26/4/2023 | (Spain) Marc Quílez (Spain) Toni Bueno | 6–3 / 1–6 / 4–6 | (Spain) Cristian G. Gutiérrez (Spain) Martín Sanchez Piñeiro | |
| 26/4/2023 | (Argentina) Agustín Tapia (Spain) Arturo Coello | 6–1 / 6–2 | (Belgium) Clément Geens (Belgium) Maxime Deloyer | |
| 26/4/2023 | (Brazil) Lucas Campagnolo (Argentina) Maxi Sánchez | 2–6 / 6–3 / 3–6 | (Spain) Alejandro Arroyo (Argentina) Lucho Capra | |
| 26/4/2023 | (Spain) Josete Rico (Spain) Salvador Oria | 0–6 / 0–6 | (Argentina) Federico Chingotto (Spain) Paquito Navarro | |
| 26/4/2023 | (Spain) Francisco Gil (Argentina) Ramiro Moyano | 4–6 / 2–6 | (Spain) Coki Nieto (Brazil) Pablo Lima | |

Women's

| Date | Team A | Score | Team B | Refs. |
|---|---|---|---|---|
| 26/4/2023 | (Spain) Tamara Icardo (Argentina) Virginia Riera | 6–2 / 6–1 | (Spain) Marina Martínez (Spain) Teresa Navarro | |
| 26/4/2023 | (Spain) Beatriz Caldera (Spain) Verónica Virseda | 7–5 / 6–2 | (Spain) Araceli Martínez (Spain) Noa Cánovas | |
| 26/4/2023 | (Argentina) Claudia Jensen (Spain) Jessica Castelló | 6–3 / 7–5 | (Spain) Majo Sánchez Alayeto (Spain) Mapi Sánchez Alayeto | |
| 26/4/2023 | (Spain) Jimena Velasco (Spain) Sara Pujals | 2–6/ 4–6 | (Spain) Carla Mesa (Spain) Esther Carnicero | |
| 26/4/2023 | (Spain) Lucía Martínez (Spain) Marta Barrera | 6–4 / 4–6 / 7–6 | (Spain) Lorena Rufo (Spain) Marta Talaván | |
| 26/4/2023 | (Spain) Alejandra Alonso (France) Alix Collombon | 6–2 / 6–0 | (Italy) Giulia Sussarello (Spain) Sandra Hernández | |
| 26/4/2023 | (Spain) Eli Amatriaín (Spain) Sofía Saiz | 6–1 / 3–6 / 6–4 | (Portugal) Ana Catarina Nogueira (Spain) Melania Merino | |
| 26/4/2023 | (Spain) Carmen Goenaga (Spain) Marta Caparrós | 7–6 / 6–2 | (Italy) Carolina Orsi (France) Léa Godallier | |
| 26/4/2023 | (Spain) Arantxa Soriano (Spain) Sandra Bellver | 3–6 / 5–7 | (Spain) Claudia Fernández (Argentina) Julieta Bidahorria | |
| 26/4/2023 | (Belgium) An-Sophie Mestach (Belgium) Helena Wyckaert | 1–6 / 3–6 | (Spain) Patty Llaguno (Spain) Victoria Iglesias | |
| 26/4/2023 | (Argentina) Aranza Osoro (Spain) Lucía Sainz | 6–2 / 7–5 | (Spain) Águeda Pérez (Spain) Sara Ruiz | |
| 26/4/2023 | (Spain) Nuria Rodríguez (Spain) Mª Carmen Villalba | 1–6 / 6–3 / 3–6 | (Sweden) Carolina Navarro (Spain) Marina Guinart | |

=== Round of 16 ===
Men's

| Date | Team A | Score | Team B | Refs. |
|---|---|---|---|---|
| 27/4/2023 | (Spain) Momo González (Argentina) Sanyo Gutiérrez | 6–1 / 7–6 | (Spain) Antón Sans (Spain) Teodoro Zapata | |
| 27/4/2023 | (Spain) Arnau Ayats (Spain) Francisco Guerrero | 3–6 / 6–2 / 2–6 | (Spain) Alex Ruiz (Argentina) Juan Tello | |
| 27/4/2023 | (Spain) José García Diestro (Spain) Pincho Fernández | 1–6 / 0–6 | (Argentina) Franco Stupaczuk (Argentina) Martín Di Nenno | |
| 27/4/2023 | (Argentina) Fernando Belasteguín (Spain) Miguel Yanguas | 4–6 / 6–2 / 6–1 | (Brazil) Lucas Bergamini (Spain) Víctor Ruiz | |
| 27/4/2023 | (Spain) Gonzalo Rubio (Spain) Javier Ruiz | 3–6 / 3–6 | (Argentina) Federico Chingotto (Spain) Paquito Navarro | |
| 27/4/2023 | (Spain) Alejandro Arroyo (Argentina) Lucho Capra | 3–6 / 7–6 / 5–7 | (Argentina) Agustín Gutiérrez (Spain) Josete Rico | |
| 27/4/2023 | (Argentina) Agustín Tapia (Spain) Arturo Coello | 6–3 / 6–3 | (Spain) Javi Garrido (Spain) Jon Sanz | |
| 27/4/2023 | (Spain) Cristian G. Gutiérrez (Spain) Martín Sanchez Piñeiro | 2–6 / 0–6 | (Spain) Coki Nieto (Brazil) Pablo Lima | |

Women's

| Date | Team A | Score | Team B | Refs. |
|---|---|---|---|---|
| 27/4/2023 | (Spain) Tamara Icardo (Argentina) Virginia Riera | 7–5 / 7–5 | (Spain) Beatriz Caldera (Spain) Verónica Virseda | |
| 27/4/2023 | (Spain) Ariana Sánchez (Spain) Paula Josemaría | 3–6 / 6–3 / 6–1 | (Spain) Carla Mesa (Spain) Esther Carnicero | |
| 27/4/2023 | (Spain) Sofía Saiz (Spain) Eli Amatriaín | 0–6 / 3–6 | (Spain) Marta Ortega (Portugal) Sofia Araújo | |
| 27/4/2023 | (Spain) Lucía Martínez (Spain) Marta Barrera | 3–6 / 6–3 / 3–6 | (Argentina) Claudia Jensen (Spain) Jessica Castelló | |
| 27/4/2023 | (Spain) Bea González (Argentina) Delfina Brea | 6–3 / 6–0 | (Spain) Alejandra Alonso (France) Alix Collombon | |
| 27/4/2023 | (Spain) Carmen Goenaga (Spain) Marta Caparrós | 4–6 / 7–6 / 6–4 | (Spain) Victoria Iglesias (Spain) Patty Llaguno | |
| 27/4/2023 | (Sweden) Carolina Navarro (Spain) Marina Guinart | 3–6/ 4–6 | (Spain) Alejandra Salazar (Spain) Gemma Triay | |
| 27/4/2023 | (Argentina) Aranza Osoro (Spain) Lucía Sainz | 6–4 / 6–3 | (Spain) Claudia Fernández (Argentina) Julieta Bidahorria | |

=== Quarter-Finals ===
Men's

| Date | Team A | Score | Team B | Refs. |
|---|---|---|---|---|
| 28/4/2023 | (Spain) Momo González (Argentina) Sanyo Gutiérrez | 6–1 / 7–6 | (Spain) Alex Ruiz (Argentina) Juan Tello | |
| 28/4/2023 | (Argentina) Fernando Belasteguín (Spain) Miguel Yanguas | 3–6 / 2–6 | (Argentina) Franco Stupaczuk (Argentina) Martín Di Nenno | |
| 28/4/2023 | (Argentina) Agustín Gutiérrez (Spain) Josete Rico | 3–6 / 1–6 | (Argentina) Federico Chingotto (Spain) Paquito Navarro | |
| 28/4/2023 | (Argentina) Agustín Tapia (Spain) Arturo Coello | 6–0 / 6–2 | (Spain) Coki Nieto (Brazil) Pablo Lima | |

Women's

| Date | Team A | Score | Team B | Refs. |
|---|---|---|---|---|
| 28/4/2023 | (Spain) Ariana Sánchez (Spain) Paula Josemaría | 6–2 / 6–4 | (Spain) Jessica Castelló (Argentina) Claudia Jensen | |
| 28/4/2023 | (Spain) Tamara Icardo (Argentina) Virginia Riera | 3–6 / 6–7 | (Spain) Marta Ortega (Portugal) Sofia Araújo | |
| 28/4/2023 | (Argentina) Aranza Osoro (Spain) Lucía Sainz | 6–4 / 2–6 / 3–6 | (Spain) Alejandra Salazar (Spain) Gemma Triay | |
| 28/4/2023 | (Spain) Bea González (Argentina) Delfina Brea | 6–1 / 6–4 | (Spain) Carmen Goenaga (Spain) Marta Caparrós | |

=== Semifinals ===
Men's

| Date | Team A | Score | Team B | Refs. |
|---|---|---|---|---|
| 29/4/2023 | (Spain) Momo González (Argentina) Sanyo Gutiérrez | 6–4 / 0–6 / 6–7 | (Argentina) Franco Stupaczuk (Argentina) Martín Di Nenno | |
| 29/4/2023 | (Argentina) Agustín Tapia (Spain) Arturo Coello | 6–2 / 6–3 | (Argentina) Federico Chingotto (Spain) Paquito Navarro | |

Women's

| Date | Team A | Score | Team B | Refs. |
|---|---|---|---|---|
| 29/4/2023 | (Spain) Ariana Sánchez (Spain) Paula Josemaría | 4–6 / 6–1 / 7–6 | (Spain) Marta Ortega (Portugal) Sofia Araújo | |
| 29/4/2023 | (Spain) Bea González (Argentina) Delfina Brea | 2–6 / 6–7 | (Spain) Alejandra Salazar (Spain) Gemma Triay | |

=== Finals ===
Men's

| Date | Team A | Score | Team B | Refs. |
|---|---|---|---|---|
| 30/4/2023 | (Argentina) Agustín Tapia (Spain) Arturo Coello | 7–6 / 3–6 / 6–3 | (Argentina) Franco Stupaczuk (Argentina) Martín Di Nenno | |

Women's

| Date | Team A | Score | Team B | Refs. |
|---|---|---|---|---|
| 30/4/2023 | (Spain) Ariana Sánchez (Spain) Paula Josemaría | 6–7 / 6–3 / 7–5 | (Spain) Alejandra Salazar (Spain) Gemma Triay | |
