= 2023 Madrid P1 =

Padel championships

- Date: 17 – 23 July
- Edition: 2nd
- Category: P1
- Prize money: € 525,000
- Location: Madrid, Spain
- Venue: Madrid Arena

Champions
- Men's doubles: (Argentina) Agustín Tapia (Spain) Arturo Coello
- Women's doubles: (Spain) Bea González (Argentina) Delfi Brea

Chronology
Prev
Italy Major
Next
Málaga Open (WPT)

The 2023 Madrid P1 was the third tournament of the second season organized by Premier Padel, promoted by the International Padel Federation, and with the financial backing of Nasser Al-Khelaïfi's Qatar Sports Investments.

In the men's final, Agustín Tapia and Arturo Coello, FIP number 4 ranked team, defeated Federico Chingotto and Paquito Navarro, FIP number 3 ranked team, in the final, winning their second title as team in the circuit and their eleventh title of the season (9 WPT and 2 in PP).

In the women's final, Bea González and Delfina Brea, FIP number 3 ranked team, defeated Ariana Sanchez and Paula Josemaria, FIP number 1 ranked team, winning their first title as pair in Premier Padel.

== Seeds ==
Male

Rnk.	Team	FIP Ranking Points
1	(Spain) Alejandro Galán (Spain) Juan Lebrón	26800
2	(Argentina) Franco Stupaczuk (Argentina) Martin Di Nenno	18245
3	(Argentina) Federico Chingotto (Spain) Paquito Navarro	14100
4	(Argentina) Agustín Tapia (Spain) Arturo Coello	13940
5	(Spain) Aléx Ruiz (Argentina) Juan Tello	11045
6	(Argentina) Fernando Belasteguín (Spain) Mike Yanguas	10813
7	(Spain) Momo Gonzalez (Argentina) Sanyo Gutiérrez	10570
8	(Argentina) Agustin Silingo (Brazil) Pablo Lima	8047

Female

Rnk.	Team	FIP Ranking Points
1	(Spain) Ariana Sanchez (Spain) Paula Josemaria	29360
2	(Spain) Gemma Triay (Spain) Marta Ortega	20215
3	(Argentina) Delfina Brea (Spain) Beatriz Gonzalez	13055
4	(Spain) Maria Pilar Sánchez (Spain) María José Sánchez	7145
5	(Argentina) Aranzazu Osoro (Spain) Lucía Sainz	7076
6	(Argentina) Claudia Jensen (Spain) Veronica Virseda	5855
7	(Spain) Jessica Castelló (Portugal) Sofia Araújo	5796
8	(Italy) Carolina Orsi (Spain) Patricia Zielinski	5030

== Draw ==
=== Men's Draw ===
Quarterfinals
1	(Spain) Galán / (Spain) Lebrón	6	2	6
(Spain) J. Martinez / (Spain) J. Ruiz	0	6	1
(Italy) F. Dominguez / (Spain) J. Moya	2	2
9	(Argentina) L. Capra / (Argentina) Maxi	6	6
10	(Brazil) L. Bergamini / (Spain) V. Ruiz	4	6	7
(Spain) M. Semmler / (Spain) P. Lijó	6	4	5
(Spain) A. Ayats / (Spain) F. Guerrero	3	2
6	(Argentina) Belasteguín / (Spain) Yanguas	6	6
5	(Spain) A. Ruiz / (Argentina) Tello	7	6
(Spain) I. Vilariño / (Spain) S. Oria	6	2
(Spain) E. Alonso / (Spain) J. Esbri	4	2
11	(Spain) Coki / (Spain) J. Sanz	6	6
16	(Argentina) A. Gutiérrez / (Spain) J. Rico	6	3	6
(Spain) A. Cepéro / (Spain) P.G. Rodrigo	3	6	3
(Spain) A. Sans / (Spain) T. Zapata	1	0
4	(Spain) Coello / (Argentina) Tapia	6	6
3	(Argentina) Chingotto / (Spain) Paquito	6	6
(Spain) D. Gil / (Spain) I. Sager	2	0
(Argentina) C.G. Gutiérrez / (Spain) M. Huete	4	3
13	(Spain) A. Arroyo / (Spain) G. Rubio	6	6
12	(Spain) F. Gil / (Argentina) R. Moyano	6	6
(Chile) J. Valdes / (Spain) J. Sanchez	3	3
(Spain) P. Cardona / (Spain) P. Fernandéz	6	7
8	(Argentina) A. Silingo / (Brazil) Lima	2	5
7	(Spain) Momo / (Argentina) Sanyo	6	7
(Spain) A. Luque / (Spain) J.L. Gonzalez	1	6
(Spain) M. del Castillo / (Spain) M. Benítez	4	3
14	(Argentina) J.C. Belluati / (Spain) J. Ruiz	6	6
16	(Spain) J. Leal / (Spain) J.G. Diestro	6	6	6
(Italy) A. Patiniotis / (Spain) E. Chamero	7	2	4
(Spain) D. Sastre / (Spain) J. Bautista	2	3
2	(Argentina) F. Stupaczuk / (Argentina) Di Nenno	6	6

Semifinals
1	(Spain) Galán / (Spain) Lebrón	3	4
9	(Argentina) L. Capra / (Argentina) Maxi	6	6
10	(Brazil) L. Bergamini / (Spain) V. Ruiz	6	6
6	(Argentina) Belasteguín / (Spain) Yanguas	4	3
5	(Spain) A. Ruiz / (Argentina) J. Tello	6	5
11	(Spain) Coki / (Spain) J. Sanz	7	7
16	(Argentina) A. Gutiérrez / (Spain) J. Rico	2	3
4	(Spain) Coello / (Argentina) Tapia	6	6
3	(Argentina) Chingotto / (Spain) Paquito	6	6
13	(Spain) A. Arroyo / (Spain) G. Rubio	3	3
12	(Spain) F. Gil / (Argentina) R. Moyano	4	7	6
8	(Spain) P. Cardona / (Spain) P. Fernandéz	6	6	1
7	(Spain) Momo / (Argentina) Sanyo	2	6	6
14	(Argentina) J.C. Belluati / (Spain) J. Ruiz	6	4	3
16	(Spain) J.G. Diestro / (Spain) J. Leal	6	1
2	(Argentina) F. Stupaczuk / (Argentina) Di Nenno	7	6

Final
9	(Argentina) L. Capra / (Argentina) Maxi	6	6
10	(Brazil) L. Bergamini / (Spain) V. Ruiz	4	4
11	(Spain) Coki / (Spain) J. Sanz	1	6	2
4	(Spain) Coello / (Argentina) Tapia	6	2	6
3	(Argentina) Chingotto / (Spain) Paquito	6	6
12	(Spain) F. Gil / (Argentina) R. Moyano	1	3
7	(Spain) Momo / (Argentina) Sanyo	7	3	*
2	(Argentina) F. Stupaczuk / (Argentina) Di Nenno	5	2

Semifinals
9	(Argentina) L. Capra / (Argentina) Maxi	6	2	5
4	(Spain) Coello / (Argentina) Tapia	3	6	7
3	(Argentina) Chingotto / (Spain) Paquito	6	6	6
7	(Spain) Momo / (Argentina) Sanyo	7	1	3

Final
4	(Spain) Coello / (Argentina) Tapia	7	6
3	(Argentina) Chingotto / (Spain) Paquito	5	2

=== Women's Draw ===
Round of 32
1	(Spain) Josemaria/ (Spain) Sánchez	6	6
(Spain) Ortiz/ (Spain) Soto	2	2
6	(Spain) Borrero/ (Russia) Sharifova	6	6
(Spain) Rojo/ (Spain) Velarde	3	1
(Spain) Lobo/ (Spain) Ortiz	6	6
(Spain) Martinez/ (Spain) Navarro	2	2
7	(Portugal) Nogueira/ (Spain) Merino	6	3	6
(Portugal) Araújo/ (Spain) Lopez	3	6	7
(Italy) C. Orsi/ (Spain) Zielinski	7	4	5
(Spain) Goenaga/ (Spain) Martinez	5	6	7
(Spain) Fuentes/ (Spain) Rodriguez	1	3
(Spain) Rodriguez/ (Spain) Talavan	6	6
8	(Italy) Casali/ (Spain) Aguilar	6	3	2
(Spain) Carnicero/ (Spain) Villalba	3	6	6
(France) Collombon/ (Spain) Iglesias	6	4	6
4	(Spain) Sánchez/ (Spain) Sánchez	3	6	3
3	(Spain) B. González / (Argentina) D. Brea	6	6
(Spain) Fructuoso/ (Spain) Perez	3	2
(Spain) Armas/ (Spain) Vallejo	3	3
(Spain) Guinart/ (Sweden) Björk	6	6
(Spain) Paredes/ (Spain) Llaguno	1	6	0
(Spain) C. Fernandez / (Argentina) J. Bidahorria	6	2	6
(Spain) Alonso/ (Spain) Ustero	2	4
5	(Spain) Osoro/ (Spain) Sainz	6	6
6	(Argentina) C. Jensen / (Spain) V. Virseda	7	6
(Spain) Caldera/ (Spain) De La Fuente	5	0
(Spain) Maldonado/ (France) Godallier	4	7	5
(Spain) Goyenche/ (Spain) Hernandez	6	5	7
(Spain) Cañellas/ (Spain) Fernández	7	6
(Spain) Alonso/ (Spain) Pascual	5	2
(Spain) Arruabarrena/ (Spain) Perez	0	2
2	(Spain) G. Triay / (Spain) M. Ortega	6	6

Round of 16
1	(Spain) Sánchez / (Spain) Josemaria	6	6
(Spain) M. Borrero / (Russia) K. Sharifova	4	3
(Spain) L. Rufo / (Spain) M. Martinez	6	4
7	(Spain) J. Lopez / (Portugal) Araújo	7	6
(Spain) C. Goenaga / (Spain) L. Martinez	7	4	6
(Spain) M. Talavan / (Spain) N. Rodriguez	5	6	3
(Spain) E. Carnicero / (Spain) M. Villalba	3	4
4	(Spain) Mapi / (Spain) Majo	6	6
3	(Spain) B. González / (Argentina) D. Brea	6	6
(Sweden) C. Navarro / (Spain) M. Guinart/	2	0
(Spain) C. Fernandez / (Argentina) J. Bidahorria	7	2
5	(Spain) A. Osoro / (Spain) L. Sainz	6	6	*
6	(Argentina) C. Jensen / (Spain) V. Virseda	*
(Spain) M. Goyenche / (Spain) S. Hernandez
(Spain) A. Cañellas / (Spain) C. Mesa	2	1
2	(Spain) G. Triay / (Spain) M. Ortega	6	6

Quarterfinals
1	(Spain) A. Sánchez / (Spain) P. Josemaria	6	6
7	(Spain) J. Castelló / (Portugal) Araújo	3	0
(Spain) C. Goenaga / (Spain) L. Martinez	2	4
4	(Spain) Mapi / (Spain) Majo	6	6
3	(Spain) B. González / (Argentina) D. Brea	6	6
5	(Spain) A. Osoro / (Spain) L. Sainz	2	0
6	(Argentina) C. Jensen / (Spain) V. Virseda	3	1
2	(Spain) G. Triay / (Spain) M. Ortega	6	6

Semifinals
1	(Spain) Sánchez / (Spain) Josemaria	6	6
4	(Spain) Mapi / (Spain) Majo	3	2
3	(Spain) B. González / (Argentina) D. Brea	6	6
2	(Spain) G. Triay / (Spain) M. Ortega	2	2

Final
1	(Spain) A. Sánchez / (Spain) P. Josemaria	7	6	6
3	(Spain) B. González / (Argentina) D. Brea	5	7	7

== Results ==
=== First Round ===
Men's

Date	Winners	Score	Opponent	Refs.
17/7/2023	(Spain) Javier Martinez Vazquez (Spain) Jorge Ruiz	6–4 / 6–2	(Spain) Alonso Rodriguez (Spain) Iñigo Jofre	
17/7/2023	(Italy) Facundo Domínguez (Spain) Jesus Moya	7–6 / 1–6 / 6–4	(Spain) Carlos Matri (Spain) Mario Ortega	
17/7/2023	(Spain) Miguel Semmler (Spain) Pablo Lijó	6–2 / 6–1	(Spain) Christian Fuster (Portugal) Pedro Araújo	
17/7/2023	(Spain) Arnay Ayats (Spain) Francisco Guerrero	6–2 / 6–3	(Spain) Ivan Ramirez (Spain) Jaime Muñoz	
17/7/2023	(Spain) Ignacio Vilariño (Spain) Salvador Oria	7–6 / 6–3	(Italy) Denis Perino (Argentina) Miguel Lamperti	
17/7/2023	(Spain) Eduardo Alonso (Spain) Juanlu Esbri	6–4 / 6–2	(Argentina) Alex Chozas (Spain) Jose Solano Marmolejo	
17/7/2023	(Spain) Alvaro Cepéro (Spain) Pablo García Rodrigo	6–4 / 6–7 / 6–1	(Spain) Diego Simon (Spain) Raul Peralta	
17/7/2023	(Spain) Anton Sans (Spain) Teodoro Zapata	6–2 / 6–1	(Spain) Miguel Gonzalez García (Spain) Miguel Solbes	
17/7/2023	(Spain) Diego Gil Batista (Spain) Ignacio Sager	5–7 / 6–2 / 6–2	(Argentina) Federico Mouriño (Argentina) Ignacio Piotto	
17/7/2023	(Argentina) Cristian German Gutiérrez (Spain) Mario Huete	6–2 / 7–5	(France) Benjamin Tison (Spain) Victor Mena Gil	
17/7/2023	(Chile) Javier Valdes (Spain) Jose David Sanchez Serrano	6–4 / 6–7 / 6–2	(Spain) Enrique Goenaga (Spain) Luis Hernandez Quesada	
17/7/2023	(Spain) Pablo Cardona (Spain) Pincho Fernandéz	6–0 / 6–2	(Spain) Adriá Mercadal (Spain) Ruben Rivera	
17/7/2023	(Spain) Antonio Luque (Spain) Jose Luis Gonzalez	6–3 / 6–0	(Italy) Nicolás Suescun (Spain) Segio Alba	
17/7/2023	(Spain) Mario del Castillo (Spain) Miguel Benítez	7–5 / 3–6 / 6–4	(Spain) J. Rico (Argentina) L. Augsburger	
17/7/2023	(Italy) Aris Patiniotis (Spain) Emilio Sanchez Chamero	6–4 / 6–4	(Spain) Rafael Mendez (Spain) Toni Bueno	
17/7/2023	(Spain) Daniel Santigosa (Spain) Jairo Bautista	6–4 / 7–5	(Spain) Jaime Fermosell (Spain) Raúl Marcos Durán	

=== Round of 32 ===
Men's

Date	Winners	Score	Opponent	Refs.
18/7/2023	(Spain) Alejandro Galán (Spain) Juan Lebrón	6–0 / 2–6 / 6–1	(Spain) Javier Martinez Vazquez (Spain) Jorge Ruiz	
19/7/2023	(Argentina) Lucho Capra (Argentina) Maxi Sánchez	6–2 / 6–2	(Italy) Facundo Domínguez (Spain) Jesus Moya	
18/7/2023	(Brazil) Lucas Bergamini (Spain) Víctor Ruiz	4–6 / 6–4 / 7–5	(Spain) Miguel Semmler (Spain) Pablo Lijó	
18/7/2023	(Argentina) Fernando Belasteguín (Spain) Miguel Yanguas	6–3 / 6–2	(Spain) Arnay Ayats (Spain) Francisco Guerrero	
19/7/2023	(Spain) Alex Ruiz (Argentina) Juan Tello	7–6 / 6–2	(Spain) Ignacio Vilariño (Spain) Salvador Oria	
19/7/2023	(Spain) Coki Nieto (Spain) Jon Sanz	6–4 / 6–2	(Spain) Eduardo Alonso (Spain) Juanlu Esbri	
19/7/2023	(Argentina) Agustín Gutiérrez (Spain) José Rico	6–3 / 3–6 / 6–3	(Spain) Alvaro Cepéro (Spain) Pablo García Rodrigo	
19/7/2023	(Argentina) Agustín Tapia (Spain) Arturo Coello	6–1 / 6–0	(Spain) Anton Sans (Spain) Teodoro Zapata	
19/7/2023	(Argentina) Federico Chingotto (Spain) Paquito Navarro	6–2 / 6–0	(Spain) Diego Gil Batista (Spain) Ignacio Sager	
19/7/2023	(Spain) Alejandro Arroyo (Spain) Gonzalo Rubio	6–4 / 6–3	(Argentina) Cristian German Gutiérrez (Spain) Mario Huete	
18/7/2023	(Spain) Francisco Gil Morales (Argentina) Ramiro Moyano	6–3 / 6–3	(Chile) Javier Valdes (Spain) Jose David Sanchez Serrano	
18/7/2023	(Spain) Pablo Cardona (Spain) Pincho Fernandéz	6–2 / 7–5	(Argentina) Agustin Gomez Silingo (Brazil) Pablo Lima	
19/7/2023	(Spain) Momo Gonzalez (Argentina) Sanyo Gutierrez	6–1 / 7–6	(Spain) Antonio Luque (Spain) Jose Luis Gonzalez	
18/7/2023	(Spain) Javi Ruiz (Argentina) Juan Cruz Belluati	6–4 / 6–3	(Spain) Mario del Castillo (Spain) Miguel Benítez	
18/7/2023	(Spain) Javi Leal (Spain) Jose García Diestro	6–7 / 6–2 / 6–4	(Italy) Aris Patiniotis (Spain) Emilio Sanchez Chamero	
18/7/2023	(Argentina) Franco Stupaczuk (Argentina) Martin Di Nenno	6–2 / 6–3	(Spain) Daniel Santigosa (Spain) Jairo Bautista	

Women's

Date	Winners	Score	Opponent	Refs.
19/7/2023	(Spain) Sánchez (Spain) Josemaria	6–2 / 6–2	(Spain) Agueda Perez (Spain) Sara Ruiz	
19/7/2023	(Spain) Ksenia Sharifova (Russia) Marta Borrero	6–3 / 6–1	(Spain) Alicia Blanco Rojo (Spain) Carla Castillo Velarde	
19/7/2023	(Spain) Lorena Rufo (Spain) Marina Martinez Lobo	6–2 / 6–2	(Spain) Araceli Martinez (Spain) Teresa Navarro	
18/7/2023	(Spain) Jessica Castelló (Portugal) Sofia Araújo	3–6 / 6–3 / 7–6	(Portugal) Ana Catarina Nogueira (Spain) Melania Merino	
19/7/2023	(Spain) Carmen Goenaga (Spain) Lucía Martinez Gomez	5–7 / 6–4 / 7–5	(Italy) Carolina Orsi (Spain) Patricia Llaguno	
18/7/2023	(Spain) Marta Talavan (Spain) Nuria Rodriguez	6–1 / 6–3	(Spain) Ana Fernandez de Osso (Spain) Laia Rodriguez Abajo	
18/7/2023	(Spain) Esther Carnicero (Spain) Maria Carmen Villalba	3–6 / 6–3 / 6–2	(Italy) Carlotta Casali (Spain) Raquel Segura	
18/7/2023	(Spain) María Pilar Sánchez Alayeto (Spain) María José Sánchez Alayeto	7–5 / 6–3	(France) Alix Collombon (Spain) Victoria Iglesias	
18/7/2023	(Spain) Bea González (Argentina) Delfina Brea	6–3 / 6–2	(Spain) Arantxa Soriano (Spain) Sandra Bellver	
18/7/2023	(Sweden) Carolina Navarro (Spain) Marina Guinart	6–3 / 6–3	(Spain) Elisabeth Amatriain (Spain) Sofía Saiz	
18/7/2023	(Spain) Claudia Fernández (Argentina) Julieta Bidahorria	6–1 / 2–6 / 6–0	(Spain) Jimena Velasco (Spain) Noa Canovas	
18/7/2023	(Argentina) Aranzazu Osoro (Spain) Lucía Sainz	6–2 / 6–4	(Spain) Alejandra Alonso (Spain) Andrea Ustero Prieto	
19/7/2023	(Argentina) Claudia Jensen (Spain) Veronica Virseda	7–5 / 6–0	(Spain) Beatriz Caldera (Spain) Marta Barrera	
19/7/2023	(Spain) Martina Fassio (Spain) Sandra Hernandez	6–4 / 5–7 / 7–5	(France) Lea Godallier (Spain) Marta Caparros	
19/7/2023	(Spain) Ariadna Cañellas (Spain) Carla Mesa	7–5 / 6–2	(Spain) Lorena Alonso (Spain) Lourdes Pascual	
19/7/2023	(Spain) Gemma Triay (Spain) Marta Ortega	6–0 / 6–2	(Spain) Lara Arruabarrena (Spain) Sara Pujals	

=== Round of 16 ===
Men's

Date	Winners	Score	Opponent	Refs.
20/7/2023	(Argentina) Lucho Capra (Argentina) Maxi Sánchez	6–3 / 6–4	(Spain) Alejandro Galán (Spain) Juan Lebrón	
20/7/2023	(Brazil) Lucas Bergamini (Spain) Víctor Ruiz	6–4 / 6–3	(Argentina) Fernando Belasteguín (Spain) Miguel Yanguas	
20/7/2023	(Spain) Coki Nieto (Spain) Jon Sanz	7–6 / 7–5	(Spain) Alex Ruiz (Argentina) Juan Tello	
20/7/2023	(Argentina) Agustín Tapia (Spain) Arturo Coello	6–2 / 6–3	(Argentina) Agustín Gutiérrez (Spain) José Rico	
20/7/2023	(Argentina) Federico Chingotto (Spain) Paquito Navarro	6–3 / 6–3	(Spain) Alejandro Arroyo (Spain) Gonzalo Rubio	
20/7/2023	(Spain) Francisco Gil Morales (Argentina) Ramiro Moyano	4–6 / 7–6 / 6–1	(Spain) Pablo Cardona (Spain) Pincho Fernandéz	
20/7/2023	(Spain) Momo Gonzalez (Argentina) Sanyo Gutierrez	2–6 / 6–4 / 6–3	(Spain) Javi Ruiz (Argentina) Juan Cruz Belluati	
20/7/2023	(Argentina) Franco Stupaczuk (Argentina) Martin Di Nenno	7–6 / 6–1	(Spain) Javi Leal (Spain) Jose García Diestro	

Women's

Date	Winners	Score	Opponent	Refs.
20/7/2023	(Spain) Sánchez (Spain) Josemaria	6–4 / 6–3	(Spain) Ksenia Sharifova (Russia) Marta Borrero	
20/7/2023	(Spain) Jessica Castelló (Portugal) Sofia Araújo	7–6 / 6–4	(Spain) Lorena Rufo (Spain) Marina Martinez Lobo	
20/7/2023	(Spain) Carmen Goenaga (Spain) Lucía Martinez Gomez	7–5 / 4–6 / 6–3	(Spain) Marta Talavan (Spain) Nuria Rodriguez	
20/7/2023	(Spain) María Pilar Sánchez Alayeto (Spain) María José Sánchez Alayeto	6–3 / 6–4	(Spain) Esther Carnicero (Spain) Maria Carmen Villalba	
20/7/2023	(Spain) Bea González (Argentina) Delfina Brea	6–2 / 6–0	(Sweden) Carolina Navarro (Spain) Marina Guinart	
20/7/2023	(Argentina) Aranzazu Osoro (Spain) Lucía Sainz	6–7 / 6–2 / W.O.	(Spain) Claudia Fernández (Argentina) Julieta Bidahorria	
20/7/2023	(Argentina) Claudia Jensen (Spain) Veronica Virseda	W.O.	(Spain) Martina Fassio (Spain) Sandra Hernandez	
20/7/2023	(Spain) Gemma Triay (Spain) Marta Ortega	6–2 / 6–1	(Spain) Ariadna Cañellas (Spain) Carla Mesa	

=== Quarter-Finals ===
Men's

Date	Winners	Score	Opponent	Refs.
21/7/2023	(Argentina) Lucho Capra (Argentina) Maxi Sánchez	6–4 / 6–4	(Brazil) Lucas Bergamini (Spain) Víctor Ruiz	
21/7/2023	(Argentina) Agustín Tapia (Spain) Arturo Coello	6–1 / 2–6 / 6–2	(Spain) Coki Nieto (Spain) Jon Sanz	
21/7/2023	(Argentina) Federico Chingotto (Spain) Paquito Navarro	6–1 / 6–3	(Spain) Francisco Gil Morales (Argentina) Ramiro Moyano	
21/7/2023	(Spain) Momo Gonzalez (Argentina) Sanyo Gutierrez	7–5 / 3–2 / W.O.	(Argentina) Franco Stupaczuk (Argentina) Martin Di Nenno	

Women's

Date	Winners	Score	Opponent	Refs.
21/7/2023	(Spain) Ariana Sánchez (Spain) Paula Josemaria	6–3 / 6–0	(Spain) Jessica Castelló (Portugal) Sofia Araújo	
21/7/2023	(Spain) María Pilar Sánchez Alayeto (Spain) María José Sánchez Alayeto	6–2 / 6–4	(Spain) Carmen Goenaga (Spain) Lucía Martinez Gomez	
21/7/2023	(Spain) Bea González (Argentina) Delfina Brea	6–0 / 6–2	(Argentina) Aranzazu Osoro (Spain) Lucía Sainz	
21/7/2023	(Spain) Gemma Triay (Spain) Marta Ortega	6–3 / 6–1	(Argentina) Claudia Jensen (Spain) Veronica Virseda	

=== Semi-Finals ===
Men's

Date	Winners	Score	Opponent	Refs.
22/7/2023	(Argentina) Agustín Tapia (Spain) Arturo Coello	3–6 / 6–2 / 7–5	(Argentina) Lucho Capra (Argentina) Maxi Sánchez	
22/7/2023	(Argentina) Federico Chingotto (Spain) Paquito Navarro	6–7 / 6–1 / 6–3	(Spain) Momo Gonzalez (Argentina) Sanyo Gutierrez	

Women's

Date	Winners	Score	Opponent	Refs.
22/7/2023	(Spain) Ariana Sánchez (Spain) Paula Josemaría	6–3 / 6–2	(Spain) María Pilar Sánchez Alayeto (Spain) María José Sánchez Alayeto	
22/7/2023	(Spain) Bea González (Argentina) Delfina Brea	6–2 / 6–2	(Spain) Gemma Triay (Spain) Marta Ortega	

=== Finals ===
Men's

Date	Winners	Score	Opponent	Refs.
23/7/2023	(Argentina) Agustín Tapia (Spain) Arturo Coello	7–5 / 6–2	(Argentina) Federico Chingotto (Spain) Paquito Navarro	

Women's

Date	Winners	Score	Opponent	Refs.
23/7/2023	(Spain) Bea González (Argentina) Delfina Brea	6–7 / 7–5 / 7–6	(Spain) Ariana Sánchez (Spain) Paula Josemaría	

== Points distribution ==
Below is a series of tables showing the ranking points and money a player can earn.

Event	First round	Second Round	Round of 16	QF	SF	F	W
Points	18	45	90	180	300	600	1000
