= 2023 Paris Major =

Padel championships

- Date: 4 – 10 September
- Edition: 2nd
- Category: Major
- Prize money: € 525,000
- Location: France, Paris
- Venue: Stade Roland Garros

Champions
- Men's doubles: (Argentina) Agustín Tapia (Spain) Arturo Coello
- Women's doubles: (Spain) Ariana Sánchez (Spain) Paula Josemaría

Chronology
Previous
Finland Open (WPT)
Next
Madrid Master (WPT)

The 2023 Paris Major was the fifth tournament of the second season organized by Premier Padel, promoted by the International Padel Federation, and with the financial backing of Nasser Al-Khelaïfi's Qatar Sports Investments.

In the women's final, Ariana Sanchez and Paula Josemaria, FIP number 1 ranked team, defeated Gemma Triay and Marta Ortega, FIP number 2 ranked team, winning their first tournament together as pair in Premier Padel tournament.

In the men's final, Agustín Tapia and Arturo Coello, FIP number 3 ranked team, defeated Federico Chingotto and Paquito Navarro, FIP number 4 ranked team, in the final, winning their fourth tournament as team in the circuit (their 14th in 20 tournaments between WPT and PP) . With the tournament victory, Coello became the sole world number one in the FIP rankings.

== Seeds ==
Male

Rnk.	Team	FIP Ranking Points
1	(Spain) Alejandro Galán (Spain) Juan Lebrón	23900
2	(Argentina) Franco Stupaczuk (Argentina) Martin Di Nenno	20025
3	(Argentina) Agustín Tapia (Spain) Arturo Coello	19790
4	(Argentina) Federico Chingotto (Spain) Paquito Navarro	16780
5	(Argentina) Fernando Belasteguín (Spain) Mike Yanguas	11805
6	(Spain) Aléx Ruiz (Argentina) Juan Tello	10565
7	(Spain) Momo Gonzalez (Argentina) Sanyo Gutiérrez	9645
8	(Argentina) Maxi Sanchéz (Argentina) Lucho Capra	6616

Female

Rnk.	Team	FIP Ranking Points
1	(Spain) Ariana Sanchez (Spain) Paula Josemaria	32100
2	(Spain) Gemma Triay (Spain) Marta Ortega	23540
3	(Spain) Beatriz Gonzalez (Argentina) Delfina Brea	15555
4	(Spain) Alejandra Salaza (Portugal) Sofia Araújo	13830
5	(Spain) María Pilar Sánchez Alayeto (Spain) María José Sánchez Alayeto	8830
6	(Spain) Tamara Icardo (Argentina) Virginia Riera	8620
7	(Spain) Lucía Sainz (Spain) Patty Llaguno	7660
8	(Argentina) Aranzazu Osoro (Spain) Jessica Castellò	7458

== Draws ==
=== Men's Draw ===
Round of 32
1	(Spain) Galán / (Spain) Lebrón	7	6
(Spain) D. Gil / (Spain) I. Sager	5	0
(Argentina) C.G. Gutiérrez / (Spain) M. Huete	2	6
16	(Argentina) A. Silingo / (Argentina) F. Mouriño	6	7
13	(Spain) A. Arroyo / (Spain) G. Rubio	6	6
(Spain) A. Melendez / (Spain) P. Melendez	1	4
(Spain) J. Valdes / (Chile) J. Sanchez	2	4
5	(Argentina) Belasteguín / (Spain) Yanguas	6	6
8	(Argentina) L. Capra / (Argentina) Maxi	6	6
(Italy) J. Restivo / (Argentina) R. Ferreyra	0	3
(Spain) A. Mercadal / (Spain) R. Rivera	0	0
11	(Spain) F. Gil / (Argentina) R. Moyano	6	2	*
15	(Spain) J. Bautista / (Spain) J. Munoz	6	2	6
(Spain) J.J. Casas / (Spain) L.H. Quesada	4	6	4
(Spain) J.M. Díaz / (Argentina) M. Lamperti	1	6
4	(Argentina) Chingotto / (Spain) Paquito	6	7
3	(Spain) Coello / (Argentina) Tapia	5	6	7
(Spain) I. Ramirez / (Spain) P.G. Rodrigo	7	3	5
(Spain) A. Martinez / (Italy) N. Suescun	0	2
12	(Spain) J. Rico / (Spain) J. Garrido	6	6
9	(Brazil) L. Bergamini / (Spain) V. Ruiz	6	6
(Spain) R. Mendez / (Spain) T. Bueno	3	1
(Spain) J. Moya / (Spain) S. Icardo	3	4
6	(Spain) A. Ruiz / (Argentina) Tello	6	6
7	(Spain) Momo / (Argentina) Sanyo	7	6
(Spain) A. Sans / (Spain) T. Zapata	5	4
(Spain) R.M. Duran / (Spain) S. Alba	2	2
10	(Spain) Coki / (Spain) J. Sanz	6	6
14	(Spain) E. Goenaga / (Spain) M. Quilez	3	6	6
(Sweden) D. Windahl / (Spain) J. Marmolejo	6	4	1
(Spain) J. Leal / (Spain) J.G. Diestro	6	6
2	(Argentina) F. Stupaczuk / (Argentina) Di Nenno	2	4

Round of 16
1	(Spain) Galán / (Spain) Lebrón	6	6
16	(Argentina) A. Silingo / (Argentina) F. Mouriño	4	1
13	(Spain) A. Arroyo / (Spain) G. Rubio	5	7	0
5	(Argentina) Belasteguín / (Spain) Yanguas	7	6	2
8	(Argentina) L. Capra / (Argentina) Maxi	6	2	7
11	(Spain) F. Gil / (Argentina) R. Moyano	4	6	5
15	(Spain) J. Bautista / (Spain) J. Munoz	2	1
4	(Argentina) Chingotto / (Spain) Paquito	6	6
3	(Spain) Coello / (Argentina) Tapia	6	6
12	(Spain) J. Rico / (Spain) J. Garrido	3	4
9	(Brazil) L. Bergamini / (Spain) V. Ruiz	6	6
6	(Spain) A. Ruiz / (Argentina) Tello	2	4
7	(Spain) Momo / (Argentina) Sanyo	5	2
10	(Spain) Coki / (Spain) J. Sanz	7	6
14	(Spain) E. Goenaga / (Spain) M. Quilez	7	2	4
(Spain) J.G. Diestro / (Spain) J. Leal	6	6	6

Quarterfinals
1	(Spain) Galán / (Spain) Lebrón	7	6
5	(Argentina) Belasteguín / (Spain) Yanguas	6	2
8	(Argentina) L. Capra / (Argentina) Sánchez	1	2
4	(Argentina) Chingotto / (Spain) Paquito	6	6
3	(Spain) Coello / (Argentina) Tapia	4	6	6
9	(Brazil) L. Bergamini / (Spain) V. Ruiz	6	1	2
15	(Spain) Coki / (Spain) J. Sanz	5	6	6
(Spain) J. Leal / (Spain) J.G. Diestro	7	3	2

Semifinals
1	(Spain) Galán / (Spain) Lebrón	2	4
4	(Argentina) Chingotto / (Spain) Paquito	6	6
3	(Spain) Coello / (Argentina) Tapia	6	6
15	(Spain) Coki / (Spain) J. Sanz	4	2	4

Final
4	(Argentina) Chingotto / (Spain) Paquito	6	1
3	(Spain) Coello / (Argentina) Tapia	7	6

=== Women's Draw ===
Round of 32
1	(Spain) A. Sánchez / (Spain) P. Josemaria	6	6
(Spain) M. Borrero / (Russia) K. Sharifova	1	3
(Spain) A. Rodero / (Spain) L. Alonso	3	3
10	(Spain) C. Fernandez / (Spain) V. Iglesias	6	6
16	(Spain) M. Lobo/ (Spain) S. Saiz	4	4
(Spain) M. Caparros / (Spain) T. Navarro	6	6
(Spain) A. Soriano / (Spain) S. Bellver	2	0
6	(Spain) T. Icardo / (Argentina) V. Riera	6	6
5	(Spain) Mapi / (Spain) Majo	3	7	4
(Portugal) A. Nogueira / (Spain) B. Caldera	6	5	6
(Spain) L. Pascual / (Spain) S. Pujals	3	1
11	(France) A. Collombon / (Spain) L. Rufo	6	6
(Argentina) C. Jensen / (Spain) V. Virseda	6	6
(Spain) C. Castillon / (Spain) N. Vivancos	1	1
(Spain) A. Alonso / (Spain) A. Ustero	7	6	5
4	(Spain) A. Salazar / (Portugal) S. Araújo	5	7	7
3	(Spain) B. González / (Argentina) D. Brea	6	6
(Spain) A. Martinez / (Spain) S. Ruiz	4	2
(Spain) J. Bautista / (Portugal) P. Ribeiro	0	2
14	(Sweden) C. Navarro / (Spain) M. Guinart	6	6
13	(Spain) C. Goenaga / (Spain) L. Martinez	6	6
(Spain) L.R. Abajo / (Spain) M. Fassio	2	2
(Spain) M. Villalba / (Spain) M. Barrera	2	6
8	(Argentina) A. Osoro / (Spain) J. Castelló	6	7
7	(Spain) L. Sainz / (Spain) P. Llaguno	6	6
(Spain) J. Velasco / (Spain) N. Canovas	3	1
(Spain) M. Hernandez/ (Spain) M. Ruiz	1	5
15	(Italy) C. Orsi / (Spain) C. Mesa	6	7
12	(Spain) M. Talavan / (Spain) N. Rodriguez	6	7
(Spain) E. Amatriain / (France) L. Godallier	4	6
(Spain) L. Manquillo / (Spain) N. Aguilar	0	0
2	(Spain) G. Triay / (Spain) M. Ortega	6	6

Round of 16
1	(Spain) A. Sánchez / (Spain) P. Josemaria	6	6
10	(Spain) C. Fernandez / (Spain) V. Iglesias	0	1
(Spain) M. Caparros / (Spain) T. Navarro	2	2
6	(Spain) T. Icardo / (Argentina) V. Riera	6	6
(Portugal) A. Nogueira / (Spain) B. Caldera	4	2
11	(France) A. Collombon / (Spain) L. Rufo	6	6
(Argentina) C. Jensen / (Spain) V. Virseda	6	2	5
4	(Spain) A. Salazar / (Portugal) S. Araújo	2	6	7
3	(Spain) B. González / (Argentina) D. Brea	6	6
14	(Sweden) C. Navarro / (Spain) M. Guinart	4	3
13	(Spain) C. Goenaga / (Spain) L. Martinez	1	6
8	(Argentina) A. Osoro / (Spain) J. Castelló	6	7
7	(Spain) L. Sainz / (Spain) P. Llaguno	6	7
15	(Spain) C. Mesa / (Italy) C. Orsi	3	5
12	(Spain) M. Talavan / (Spain) N. Rodriguez	2	4
2	(Spain) G. Triay / (Spain) M. Ortega	6	6

Quarterfinals
1	(Spain) A. Sánchez / (Spain) P. Josemaria	6	6
6	(Spain) T. Icardo / (Argentina) V. Riera	2	0
11	(France) A. Collombon / (Spain) Lorena Rufo	5	3
4	(Spain) A. Salazar / (Portugal) S. Araújo	7	6
3	(Spain) B. González / (Argentina) D. Brea	5	2
8	(Argentina) A. Osoro / (Spain) J. Castelló	7	6
7	(Spain) L. Sainz / (Spain) Patty Llaguno	6	4	4
2	(Spain) G. Triay / (Spain) M. Ortega	3	6	6

Semifinals
1	(Spain) A. Sánchez / (Spain) P. Josemaria	3	7	6
4	(Spain) A. Salazar / (Portugal) S. Araújo	6	5	2
3	(Argentina) A. Osoro / (Spain) J. Castelló	3	2
2	(Spain) G. Triay / (Spain) M. Ortega	6	6

Final
1	(Spain) A. Sánchez / (Spain) P. Josemaria	6	6
2	(Spain) G. Triay / (Spain) M. Ortega	2	4

== Results ==
=== First Round ===
Men's

Date	Winners	Score	Opponent	Refs.
5/9/2023	(Spain) Diego Gil Batista (Spain) Ignacio Sager	6–7 / 6–3 / 6–4	(Spain) Miguel Semmler (Spain) Pablo Lijó	
5/9/2023	(Argentina) Cristian German Gutiérrez (Spain) Mario Huete	3–6 / 6–3 / 6–1	(Spain) Gaspar Gampos (Spain) J.M. Mouliaa Lopez	
4/9/2023	(Argentina) Agustin Gomez Silingo (Argentina) Federico Mouriño	7–6 / 6–0	(Spain) Carlos Perez Cabeza (Italy) Emiliano iriart	
4/9/2023	(Spain) Alejandro Arroyo (Spain) Gonzalo Rubio	4–6 / 7–5 / 6–2	(Spain) Antonio Luque (Spain) Jose Luis Gonzalez	
4/9/2023	(Spain) Alvaro Melendez Amaya (Spain) Pedro Melendez Amaya	6–4 / 6–4	(Spain) Ignacio Vilariño (Spain) Salvador Oria	
4/9/2023	(Spain) Javier Valdes (Chile) Jose David Sanchez Serrano	4–6 / 6–4 / 6–2	(Spain) Ferran Insa Sotillo (France) Thomas Leygue	
5/9/2023	(Italy) Juan Manuel Restivo (Argentina) Relis Ferreyra	6–3 / 5–7 / 6–4	(Spain) Gerard Arnaldos Serrano (Spain) Ricardo Martinez Sanchez	
4/9/2023	(Spain) Adriá Mercadal (Spain) Ruben Rivera	6–4 / 6–7 / 7–6	(France) Adrien Maigret (France) Jerome Inzerillo	
4/9/2023	(Spain) Francisco Gil Morales (Argentina) Ramiro Moyano	6–2 / 6–2	(Spain) Javier Gonzalez Barahona (Spain) Javier García Mora	
5/9/2023	(Spain) Jairo Bautista (Spain) Jaime Muñoz	6–3 / 6–3	(Argentina) Juan Cruz Belluati (Spain) Javi Ruiz	
5/9/2023	(Spain) Luis Hernandez Quesada (Spain) Jose Jimenez Casas	6–2 / 6–1	(Spain) Fran Ramirez Navas (Spain) Pedro Vera Castillo	
5/9/2023	(Spain) J.M. Díaz (Argentina) Miguel Lamperti	6–2 / 2–6 / 6–4	(Argentina) Alex Chozas (Spain) Alvaro Cepero	
5/9/2023	(Spain) Ivan Ramirez (Spain) Pablo García Rodrigo	6–3 / 6–2	(Spain) Pablo Cardona (Spain) Pincho Fernandez	
5/9/2023	(Spain) Alonso Rodriguez Martinez (Italy) Nicolas Suescun	4–6 / 6–3 / 6–4	(Italy) Denis Perino (Italy) Facundo Domínguez	
5/9/2023	(Spain) Javi Rico (Spain) Javier Garrido	6–0 / 3–6 / 6–1	(Spain) Adrian Ronco Lopez (Spain) Pepe Aliaga	
5/9/2023	(Brazil) Lucas Bergamini (Spain) Victor Ruiz	6–2 / 4–6 / 7–6	(Spain) Eduardo Alonso (Spain) Juanlu Esbri	
5/9/2023	(Spain) Toni Bueno (Spain) Rafael Mendez	7–5 / 1–6 / 6–4	(Italy) Aris Patiniotis (Spain) Emilio Sanchez Chamero	
4/9/2023	(Spain) Jesus Moya (Spain) Sergio Icardo	6–3 / 6–3	(Brazil) Chico Gomes (France) Jeremy Scatena	
4/9/2023	(Spain) Anton Sans (Spain) Teodoro Zapata	6–3 / 6–1	(France) Bastien Blanque (France) Dylan Guichard	
5/9/2023	(Spain) Raúl Marcos Duran (Spain) Sergio Alba	7–6 / 3–6 / 7–6	(France) Benjamin Tison (Spain) Victor Mena Gil	
5/9/2023	(Spain) Coki Nieto (Spain) Jon Sanz	7–5 / 7–6	(Spain) Arnau Ayats (Spain) Francisco Guerrero	
5/9/2023	(Spain) Enrique Goenaga (Spain) Marc Quilez	6–4 / 6–2	(Argentina) Agustín Gutiérrez (Spain) Javi Rico	
5/9/2023	(Sweden) Daniel Windahl (Spain) Jose Solano Marmolejo	6–4 / 6–4	(Spain) Carlos Marti (Spain) Mario Ortega	
4/9/2023	(Spain) Javi Leal (Spain) Jose García Diestro	6–3 / 6–2	(Spain) Miguel Gonzalez García (Spain) Miguel Solbes	

Women's

Date	Winners	Score	Opponent	Refs.
4/9/2023	(Russia) Ksenia Sharifova (Spain) Marta Borrero	6–3 / 6–2	(Spain) Castillo/ (Spain) Garcia	
4/9/2023	(Spain) Ariadna Cañellas Rodero (Spain) Lorena Alonso	7–5 / 1–6 / 6–3	(Italy) Carlotta Casali (Spain) Raquel Aguilar	
5/9/2023	(Spain) Marta Caparros (Spain) Teresa Navarro	6–3 / 6–3	(France) Lucile Pothier (France) Jessica Ginier	
5/9/2023	(Spain) Arantxa Soriano (Spain) Sandra Bellver	6–3 / 7–6	(Spain) Marta Arellano Navarro (Brazil) Raquel Piltcher	
5/9/2023	(Portugal) Ana Catarina Nogueira (Spain) Beatriz Caldera	6–3 / 6–3	(Italy) Emily Stellato (Italy) Giulia Sussarello	
4/9/2023	(Spain) Lourdes Pascual (Spain) Sara Pujals	6–4 / 7–6	(Spain) Ana Dominguez Gracia (Spain) Ana Varo Ramos	
5/9/2023	(Spain) Carmen Castillon (Spain) Nuria Vivancos	6–3 / 6–2	(Italy) Chiara Pappacena (Italy) Giorgia Marchetti	
5/9/2023	(Spain) Alejandra Alonso (Spain) Andrea Ustero	6–1 / 6–3	(Spain) Ana Fernandez de Osso (Spain) Lara Arruabarrena	
5/9/2023	(Spain) Araceli Martinez (Spain) Sara Ruiz	6–3 / 6–1	(Brazil) Manuela Schuck (Spain) Maria Pinacho	
5/9/2023	(Spain) Julia Polo Bautista (Portugal) Patricia Ribeiro	6–2 / 6–2	(Spain) Ainhoa Rico Marin (Spain) Rebeca Lopez	
4/9/2023	(Spain) Laia Rodriguez Abajo (Spain) Martina Fassio	6–3 / 6–3	(France) Elodie Invernon (France) Wendy Barsotti	
4/9/2023	(Spain) Marta Barrera (Spain) Mari Carmen Villalba	6–1 / 7–5	(Netherlands) Marcella Koek (Netherlands) Steffie Weterings	
5/9/2023	(Spain) Jimena Velasco (Spain) Noa Canovas	6–0 / 6–1	(Spain) Carla Serrano Gonzalez (Italy) Lorena Vano Martin	
5/9/2023	(Spain) María Castañera (Spain) Mireia Herrada Ruiz	1–6 / 7–5 / 6–2	(Spain) Patricia Martinez Fortun (Spain) Xenia Clasca	
4/9/2023	(Spain) Elisabet Amatriain Armas (France) Lea Godallier	7–6 / 6–3	(Spain) Alicia Blanco Rojo (Spain) Monica Gomez Rivas	
4/9/2023	(Spain) Letizia Maria Manquillo (Spain) Noemí Aguilar	6–2 / 6–7 / 6–1	(Spain) Alba Perez Momha (Spain) Lucía García Trella	

=== Round of 32 ===
Men's

Date	Winners	Score	Opponent	Refs.
6/9/2023	(Spain) Alejandro Galán (Spain) Juan Lebrón	7–5 / 6–0	(Spain) Diego Gil Batista (Spain) Ignacio Sager	
6/9/2023	(Argentina) Agustin Gomez Silingo (Argentina) Federico Mouriño	6–2 / 7–6	(Argentina) Cristian German Gutiérrez (Spain) Mario Huete	
6/9/2023	(Spain) Alejandro Arroyo (Spain) Gonzalo Rubio	6–1 / 6–4	(Spain) Alvaro Melendez Amaya (Spain) Pedro Melendez Amaya	
6/9/2023	(Argentina) Fernando Belasteguín (Spain) Miguel Yanguas	6–2 / 6–4	(Spain) Javier Valdes (Chile) Jose David Sanchez Serrano	
6/9/2023	(Argentina) Lucho Capra (Argentina) Maxi Sánchez	6–0 / 6–3	(Italy) Juan Manuel Restivo (Argentina) Relis Ferreyra	
6/9/2023	(Spain) Francisco Gil Morales (Argentina) Ramiro Moyano	6–0 / 2–0 / W.O.	(Spain) Adriá Mercadal (Spain) Ruben Rivera	
6/9/2023	(Spain) Jairo Bautista (Spain) Jaime Muñoz	6–4 / 2–6 / 6–4	(Spain) Luis Hernandez Quesada (Spain) Jose Jimenez Casas	
6/9/2023	(Argentina) Federico Chingotto (Spain) Paquito Navarro	6–1 / 7–6	(Spain) J.M. Díaz (Argentina) Miguel Lamperti	
6/9/2023	(Argentina) Agustín Tapia (Spain) Arturo Coello	5–7 / 6–3 / 7–5	(Spain) Ivan Ramirez (Spain) Pablo García Rodrigo	
6/9/2023	(Spain) Javi Rico (Spain) Javier Garrido	6–0 / 6–2	(Spain) Alonso Rodriguez Martinez (Italy) Nicolas Suescun	
6/9/2023	(Brazil) Lucas Bergamini (Spain) Victor Ruiz	6–3 / 6–1	(Spain) Toni Bueno (Spain) Rafael Mendez	
6/9/2023	(Spain) Alex Ruiz (Argentina) Juan Tello	6–3 / 6–4	(Spain) Jesus Moya (Spain) Sergio Icardo	
6/9/2023	(Spain) Momo Gonzalez (Argentina) Sanyo Gutierrez	7–5 / 6–4	(Spain) Anton Sans (Spain) Teodoro Zapata	
6/9/2023	(Spain) Coki Nieto (Spain) Jon Sanz	6–2 / 6–2	(Spain) Raúl Marcos Duran (Spain) Sergio Alba	
6/9/2023	(Spain) Enrique Goenaga (Spain) Marc Quilez	3–6 / 6–4 / 6–1	(Sweden) Daniel Windahl (Spain) Jose Solano Marmolejo	
6/9/2023	(Spain) Javi Leal (Spain) Jose García Diestro	6–2 / 6–4	(Argentina) Franco Stupaczuk (Argentina) Martin Di Nenno	

Women's

Date	Winners	Score	Opponent	Refs.
6/9/2023	(Spain) Ariana Sánchez (Spain) Paula Josemaria	6–1 / 6–3	(Russia) Ksenia Sharifova (Spain) Marta Borrero	
6/9/2023	(Spain) Claudia Fernandez (Spain) Victoria Iglesias	6–3 / 6–3	(Spain) Ariadna Cañellas Rodero (Spain) Lorena Alonso	
6/9/2023	(Spain) Marta Caparros (Spain) Teresa Navarro	6–4 / 6–4	(Spain) Marina Martinez Lobo (Spain) Sofía Saiz Vallejo	
6/9/2023	(Spain) Tamara Icardo (Argentina) Virginia Riera	6–2 / 6–0	(Spain) Arantxa Soriano (Spain) Sandra Bellver	
6/9/2023	(Portugal) Ana Catarina Nogueira (Spain) Beatriz Caldera	6–3 / 5–7 / 6–4	(Spain) María Pilar Sánchez Alayeto (Spain) María José Sánchez Alayeto	
6/9/2023	(France) Alix Collombon (Spain) Lorena Rufo	6–3 / 6–1	(Spain) Lourdes Pascual (Spain) Sara Pujals	
6/9/2023	(Argentina) Claudia Jensen (Spain) Veronica Virseda	6–1 / 6–1	(Spain) Carmen Castillon (Spain) Nuria Vivancos	
6/9/2023	(Spain) Alejandra Salazar (Portugal) Sofia Araújo	5–7 / 7–6 / 7–5	(Spain) Alejandra Alonso (Spain) Andrea Ustero	
6/9/2023	(Spain) Bea González (Argentina) Delfina Brea	6–4 / 6–2	(Spain) Araceli Martinez (Spain) Sara Ruiz	
6/9/2023	(Sweden) Carolina Navarro (Spain) Marina Guinart	6–0 / 6–2	(Spain) Julia Polo Bautista (Portugal) Patricia Ribeiro	
6/9/2023	(Spain) Carmen Goenaga (Spain) Lucía Martinez	6–2 / 6–2	(Spain) Laia Rodriguez Abajo (Spain) Martina Fassio	
6/9/2023	(Argentina) Aranzazu Osoro (Spain) Jessica Castelló	6–2 / 7–6	(Spain) Marta Barrera (Spain) Mari Carmen Villalba	
6/9/2023	(Spain) Lucia Sainz (Spain) Patty Llaguno	6–3 / 6–1	(Spain) Jimena Velasco (Spain) Noa Canovas	
6/9/2023	(Spain) Carla Mesa (Italy) Carolina Orsi	6–1 / 7–5	(Spain) María Castañera (Spain) Mireia Herrada Ruiz	
6/9/2023	(Spain) Marta Talavan (Spain) Nuria Rodriguez	6–4 / 7–6	(Spain) Elisabet Amatriain Armas (France) Lea Godallier	
6/9/2023	(Spain) Gemma Triay (Spain) Marta Ortega'	6–0 / 6–0	(Spain) Letizia Maria Manquillo (Spain) Noemí Aguilar	

=== Round of 16 ===
Men's

Date	Winners	Score	Opponent	Refs.
7/9/2023	(Spain) Alejandro Galán (Spain) Juan Lebrón	6–4 / 6–1	(Argentina) Agustin Gomez Silingo (Argentina) Federico Mouriño	
7/9/2023	(Argentina) Fernando Belasteguín (Spain) Miguel Yanguas	7–5 / 6–7 / 2–0 / W.O.	(Spain) Alejandro Arroyo (Spain) Gonzalo Rubio	
7/9/2023	(Argentina) Lucho Capra (Argentina) Maxi Sánchez	6–4 / 2–6 / 7–5	(Spain) Francisco Gil Morales (Argentina) Ramiro Moyano	
7/9/2023	(Argentina) Federico Chingotto (Spain) Paquito Navarro	6–2 / 6–1	(Spain) Jairo Bautista (Spain) Jaime Muñoz	
7/9/2023	(Argentina) Agustín Tapia (Spain) Arturo Coello	6–3 / 6–4	(Spain) Javi Rico (Spain) Javier Garrido	
7/9/2023	(Brazil) Lucas Bergamini (Spain) Victor Ruiz	6–2 / 6–4	(Spain) Alex Ruiz (Argentina) Juan Tello	
7/9/2023	(Spain) Coki Nieto (Spain) Jon Sanz	7–5 / 6–2	(Spain) Momo Gonzalez (Argentina) Sanyo Gutierrez	
7/9/2023	(Spain) Javi Leal (Spain) Jose García Diestro	6–7 / 6–2 / 6–4	(Spain) Enrique Goenaga (Spain) Marc Quilez	

Women's

Date	Winners	Score	Opponent	Refs.
7/9/2023	(Spain) Ariana Sánchez (Spain) Paula Josemaria	6–0 / 6–1	(Spain) Claudia Fernandez (Spain) Victoria Iglesias	
7/9/2023	(Spain) Tamara Icardo (Argentina) Virginia Riera	6–2 / 6–2	(Spain) Marta Caparros (Spain) Teresa Navarro	
7/9/2023	(France) Alix Collombon (Spain) Lorena Rufo	6–4 / 6–2	(Portugal) Ana Catarina Nogueira (Spain) Beatriz Caldera	
7/9/2023	(Spain) Alejandra Salazar (Portugal) Sofia Araújo	2–6 / 6–2 / 7–5	(Argentina) Claudia Jensen (Spain) Veronica Virseda	
7/9/2023	(Spain) Bea González (Argentina) Delfina Brea	6–4 / 6–3	(Sweden) Carolina Navarro (Spain) Marina Guinart	
7/9/2023	(Argentina) Aranzazu Osoro (Spain) Jessica Castelló	6–1 / 7–6	(Spain) Carmen Goenaga (Spain) Lucía Martinez	
7/9/2023	(Spain) Lucia Sainz (Spain) Patty Llaguno	6–3 / 7–5	(Spain) Carla Mesa (Italy) Carolina Orsi	
7/9/2023	(Spain) Gemma Triay (Spain) Marta Ortega'	6–2 / 6–4	(Spain) Marta Talavan (Spain) Nuria Rodriguez	

=== Quarter-Finals ===
Men's

Date	Winners	Score	Opponent	Refs.
8/9/2023	(Spain) Alejandro Galán (Spain) Juan Lebrón	7–6 / 6–2	(Argentina) Fernando Belasteguín (Spain) Miguel Yanguas	
8/9/2023	(Argentina) Federico Chingotto (Spain) Paquito Navarro	6–1 / 6–2	(Argentina) Lucho Capra (Argentina) Maxi Sánchez	
8/9/2023	(Argentina) Agustín Tapia (Spain) Arturo Coello	4–6 / 6–1 / 6–2	(Brazil) Lucas Bergamini (Spain) Victor Ruiz	
8/9/2023	(Spain) Coki Nieto (Spain) Jon Sanz	5–7 / 6–3 / 6–2	(Spain) Javi Leal (Spain) Jose García Diestro	

Women's

Date	Winners	Score	Opponent	Refs.
8/9/2023	(Spain) Ariana Sánchez (Spain) Paula Josemaria	6–2 / 6–0	(Spain) Tamara Icardo (Argentina) Virginia Riera	
8/9/2023	(Spain) Alejandra Salazar (Portugal) Sofia Araújo	7–5 / 6–3	(France) Alix Collombon (Spain) Lorena Rufo	
8/9/2023	(Argentina) Aranzazu Osoro (Spain) Jessica Castelló	7–5 / 6–2	(Spain) Bea González (Argentina) Delfina Brea	
8/9/2023	(Spain) Gemma Triay (Spain) Marta Ortega'	3–6 / 6–4 / 6–4	(Spain) Lucia Sainz (Spain) Patty Llaguno	

=== Semi-Finals ===
Men's

Date	Winners	Score	Opponent	Refs.
9/9/2023	(Argentina) Federico Chingotto (Spain) Paquito Navarro	6–2 / 6–4	(Spain) Alejandro Galán (Spain) Juan Lebrón	
9/9/2023	(Argentina) Agustín Tapia (Spain) Arturo Coello	6–2 / 6–4	(Spain) Coki Nieto (Spain) Jon Sanz	

Women's

Date	Winners	Score	Opponent	Refs.
9/9/2023	(Spain) Ariana Sánchez (Spain) Paula Josemaria	3–6 / 7–5 / 6–2	(Spain) Alejandra Salazar (Portugal) Sofia Araújo	
9/9/2023	(Spain) Gemma Triay (Spain) Marta Ortega'	6–3 / 6–2	(Argentina) Aranzazu Osoro (Spain) Jessica Castelló	

=== Finals ===
Men's

Date	Winners	Score	Opponent	Refs.
10/9/2023	(Argentina) Agustín Tapia (Spain) Arturo Coello	7–6 / 6–1	(Argentina) Federico Chingotto (Spain) Paquito Navarro	

Women's

Date	Winners	Score	Opponent	Refs.
10/9/2023	(Spain) Ariana Sánchez (Spain) Paula Josemaria	6–2 / 6–4	(Spain) Alejandra Salazar (Portugal) Sofia Araújo	

== Points distribution ==
Below is a series of tables showing the ranking points and money a player can earn.

Event	First round	Second Round	Round of 16	QF	SF	F	W
Points	40	90	180	360	750	1200	2000
Money	€1500	€2900	€5250	€8500	€13000	€23600	€47300
