= 2023 Italy Major =

Padel championships

- Date: 10 – 16 July
- Edition: 2nd
- Category: Major
- Prize money: € 525,000
- Location: Rome, Italy
- Venue: Foro Italico

Champions
- Men's doubles: (Argentina) Agustín Tapia (Spain) Arturo Coello
- Women's doubles: (Spain) Gemma Triay (Spain) Marta Ortega

Chronology
Previous
Valencia Open (WPT)
Next
Madrid P1

The 2023 BNL Italy Major or 2023 Italy Major was the second tournament of the second season organized by Premier Padel, promoted by the International Padel Federation, and with the financial backing of Nasser Al-Khelaïfi's Qatar Sports Investments.

In the men's final, Agustín Tapia and Arturo Coello, FIP number 4 ranked team, defeated Federico Chingotto and Paquito Navarro, FIP number 3 ranked team, in the final, winning their first title as team in the circuit (and their tenth title between WPT and PP).

In the women's final, Gemma Triay and Marta Ortega, FIP number 2 ranked team, defeated Ariana Sanchez and Paula Josemaria, FIP number 1 ranked team, becoming the first female pair to win a Premier Padel tournament.

== Seeds ==
Male

| Rnk. | Team | FIP Ranking Points |
|---|---|---|
| 1 | (Spain) Alejandro Galán (Spain) Juan Lebrón | 26800 |
| 2 | (Argentina) Franco Stupaczuk (Argentina) Martin Di Nenno | 18245 |
| 3 | (Argentina) Federico Chingotto (Spain) Paquito Navarro | 14100 |
| 4 | (Argentina) Agustín Tapia (Spain) Arturo Coello | 13940 |
| 5 | (Spain) Aléx Ruiz (Argentina) Juan Tello | 11045 |
| 6 | (Argentina) Fernando Belasteguín (Spain) Mike Yanguas | 10813 |
| 7 | (Spain) Momo Gonzalez (Argentina) Sanyo Gutiérrez | 10570 |
| 8 | (Argentina) Agustin Silingo (Brazil) Pablo Lima | 8047 |

Female

| Rnk. | Team | WPT Ranking Points |
|---|---|---|
| 1 | (Spain) Ariana Sanchez (Spain) Paula Josemaria | 29360 |
| 2 | (Spain) Gemma Triay (Spain) Marta Ortega | 20215 |
| 3 | (Argentina) Delfina Brea (Spain) Beatriz Gonzalez | 13055 |
| 4 | (Argentina) Maria Virginia Riera (Spain) Tamara Icardo | 9190 |
| 5 | (Spain) Maria Pilar Sánchez (Spain) María José Sánchez | 7145 |
| 6 | (Argentina) Aranzazu Osoro (Spain) Lucía Sainz | 7076 |
| 7 | (Argentina) Claudia Jensen (Spain) Veronica Virseda | 5855 |
| 8 | (Spain) Jessica Castelló (Portugal) Sofia Araújo | 5796 |

== Draws ==
=== Men's Draw ===
Round of 32
1 | (Spain) Galán / (Spain) Lebrón | 6 | 6
(Spain) P. Fernandéz / (Spain) P. Cardona | 2 | 3
(Spain) R. Mendez / (Spain) T. Bueno | 3 | 6 | 2
16 | (Argentina) A. Gutiérrez / (Spain) J. Rico | 6 | 3 | 6
14 | (Spain) A. Arroyo / (Spain) G. Rubio | 7 | 6
(Chile) J. Valdes / (Spain) J. Serrano | 6 | 3
(Spain) A. Luque / (Spain) J.L. Gonzalez | 4 | 3
6 | (Argentina) Belasteguín / (Spain) Yanguas | 6 | 6
5 | (Spain) A. Ruiz / (Argentina) Tello | 7 | 6
(Argentina) C.G. Gutiérrez / (Spain) M. Huete | 6 | 4
(Spain) M. del Castillo / (Spain) M. Benítez | 6 | 6
15 | (Spain) E. Alonso / (Spain) J. Esbri | 4 | 4
13 | (Spain) F. Gil / (Argentina) R. Moyano | 6 | 4 | 4
(Spain) I. Ramirez / (Spain) J. Muñoz | 4 | 6 | 6
(Italy) D. Cattaneo / (Italy) L. Di Giovanni | 2 | 2
3 | (Argentina) Chingotto / (Spain) Paquito | 6 | 6
4 | (Spain) Coello / (Argentina) Tapia | 6 | 6
(Spain) J. Bautista / (Spain) Díaz | 3 | 2
(Argentina) A. Chozas / (Spain) J. Marmolejo | *
10 | (Brazil) L. Campagnolo / (Spain) J. Garrido
11 | (Brazil) L. Bergamini / (Spain) V. Ruiz | 7 | 6
(Spain) J. Fermosell / (Spain) R.M. Durán | 6 | 2
(Italy) D. Perino / (Argentina) M. Lamperti | 7 | 6
7 | (Spain) Momo / (Argentina) Sanyo | 6 | 4
8 | (Argentina) A. Silingo / (Brazil) Lima | 2 | 7 | 0
(Spain) A. Melendez / (Spain) P. Melendez | 6 | 5 | 6
(Spain) J. Martinez / (Spain) J. Ruiz | 2 | 4
9 | (Argentina) L. Capra / (Argentina) Maxi | 6 | 6
12 | (Spain) Coki / (Spain) J. Sanz | 3 | 6 | 7
(Spain) M. Semmler / (Spain) P. Lijó | 6 | 4 | 6
(Spain) J. Leal / (Spain) J.G. Diestro | 6 | 3 | 6
2 | (Argentina) F. Stupaczuk / (Argentina) Di Nenno | 4 | 6 | 7

Round of 16
1 | (Spain) Galán / (Spain) Lebrón | 6 | 6
16 | (Argentina) A. Gutiérrez / (Spain) J. Rico | 1 | 4
14 | (Spain) A. Arroyo / (Spain) G. Rubio | 6 | 3 | 4
6 | (Argentina) Belasteguín / (Spain) Yanguas | 2 | 6 | 6
5 | (Spain) A. Ruiz / (Argentina) J. Tello | 6 | 2
(Spain) M. del Castillo / (Spain) M. Benítez | 7 | 6
(Spain) I. Ramirez / (Spain) J. Muñoz | 3 | 1
3 | (Argentina) Chingotto / (Spain) Paquito | 6 | 6
4 | (Spain) Coello / (Argentina) Tapia | 6 | 6
(Argentina) A. Chozas / (Spain) J. Marmolejo | 3 | 1
11 | (Brazil) L. Bergamini / (Spain) V. Ruiz | 4 | 6 | 6
(Italy) D. Perino / (Argentina) M. Lamperti | 6 | 4 | 4
(Spain) A. Melendez / (Spain) P. Melendez | 2 | 1
9 | (Argentina) L. Capra / (Argentina) Maxi | 6 | 6
12 | (Spain) Coki / (Spain) J. Sanz | 6 | 3 | 3
2 | (Argentina) F. Stupaczuk / (Argentina) Di Nenno | 4 | 6 | 6

Quarterfinals
1 | (Spain) Galán / (Spain) Lebrón | 3 | 1
6 | (Argentina) Belasteguín / (Spain) Yanguas | 6 | 6
(Spain) M. del Castillo / (Spain) M. Benítez | 0 | 1
3 | (Argentina) Chingotto / (Spain) Paquito | 6 | 6
4 | (Spain) Coello / (Argentina) Tapia | 6 | 7
11 | (Brazil) L. Bergamini / (Spain) V. Ruiz | 3 | 6
9 | (Argentina) L. Capra / (Argentina) Maxi | 7 | 6 | 4
2 | (Argentina) F. Stupaczuk / (Argentina) Di Nenno | 6 | 7 | 6

Semifinals
6 | (Argentina) Belasteguín / (Spain) Yanguas | 1 | 2
3 | (Argentina) Chingotto / (Spain) Paquito | 6 | 6
4 | (Spain) Coello / (Argentina) Tapia | 6 | 6
2 | (Argentina) F . Stupaczuk / (Argentina) Di Nenno | 2 | 3

Final
3 | (Argentina) Chingotto / (Spain) Paquito | 5 | 6
4 | (Argentina) Tapia / (Spain) Coello | 7 | 7

=== Women's Draw ===
Round of 32
1 | (Spain) A. Sánchez / (Spain) P. Josemaria | 6 | 6
(Spain) A. Alonso / (Spain) A. Prieto | 0 | 3
(Spain) E. Amatriain / (Spain) Sofia Saiz | 3 | 4
13 | (Spain) C. Goenaga / (Spain) L. Martinez | 6 | 6
16 | (Spain) E. Carnicero / (Spain) M. Villalba | 7 | 6
(Spain) A. Martinez / (Spain) T. Navarro | 5 | 4
(Italy) E. Stellato / (Italy) G. Sussarello | 2 | 2
7 | (Argentina) C. Jensen / (Spain) V. Virseda | 6 | 6
6 | (Argentina) A. Osoro / (Spain) L. Sainz | 6 | 6
(Spain) L. Manquillo / (Spain) P. Ribeiro | 1 | 0
(France) L. Godallier / (Spain) M. Caparros | 2 | 6 | 3
15 | (Spain) L. Rufo / (Spain) M. Martinez | 6 | 4 | 6
14 | (Sweden) C. Navarro / (Spain) M. Guinart | 6 | 6
(Spain) L. Alonso / (Spain) L. Pascual | 1 | 4
(Spain) J. Velasco / (Spain) N. Canovas | 2 | 1
3 | (Spain) B. González / (Argentina) D. Brea | 6 | 6
(Spain) M. Arellano / (Spain) R. López | 1 | 6 | 4
(Portugal) A. Nogueira / (Spain) M. Merino | 6 | 3 | 6
(Spain) L. Arruabarrena / (Spain) S. Pujals | 3 | 1
10 | (France) A. Collombon / (Spain) V. Iglesias | 6 | 6
9 | (Italy) C. Orsi / (Spain) P. Llaguno | 6 | 6
(Italy) C. Casali / (Spain) J. Bautista | 1 | 1
(Spain) A.F. De Osso / (Spain) M.R. Abajo | 4 | 1
5 | (Spain) Mapi / (Spain) Majo | 6 | 6
8 | (Spain) J. Castelló / (Portugal) S. Araújo | 6 | 6
(Spain) A. Cañellas / (Spain) C. Mesa | 2 | 3
(Italy) C. Pappacena / (Italy) G. Marchetti | 4 | 1
11 | (Spain) M. Talavan / (Spain) N. Rodriguez | 6 | 6
12 | (Spain) C. Fernandez / (Argentina) J. Bidahorria | 6 | 6
(Spain) A. Rojo / (Spain) N. Aguilar | 3 | 0
(Spain) C. Castillon / (Spain) N. Vivancos | 1 | 2
2 | (Spain) G. Triay / (Spain) M. Ortega | 6 | 6

Round of 16
1 | (Spain) A. Sánchez / (Spain) P. Josemaria' | 6 | 6
13 | (Spain) E. Goenaga / (Spain) L. Martinez | 2 | 1
16 | (Spain) E. Carnicero / (Spain) M. Villalba | 0 | 2
7 | (Argentina) C. Jensen / (Spain) V. Virseda | 6 | 6
6 | (Argentina) A. Osoro / (Spain) L. Sainz | 6 | 6
15 | (Spain) L. Rufo / (Spain) M. Martinez | 3 | 1
14 | (Sweden) C. Navarro / (Spain) M. Guinart | 2 | 6
3 | (Spain) B. González / (Argentina) D. Brea | 6 | 7
(Portugal) Nogueira / (Spain) M. Merino | 3 | 2
10 | (France) A. Collombon / (Spain) V. Iglesias | 6 | 6
9 | (Italy) C. Orsi / (Spain) P. Llaguno | 6 | 3 | 4
5 | (Spain) Mapi / (Spain) Majo | 0 | 6 | 6
8 | (Spain) J. Castelló / (Portugal) S. Araújo | 6 | 6
11 | (Spain) M. Talavan / (Spain) N. Rodriguez | 3 | 0
12 | (Spain) C. Fernández / (Argentina) J. Bidahorria | 0 | 1
2 | (Spain) G. Triay / (Spain) M. Ortega | 6 | 6

Quarterfinals
1 | (Spain) A. Sánchez / (Spain) P. Josemaria | 6 | 5 | 6
7 | (Argentina) C. Jensen / (Spain) V. Virseda | 1 | 7
6 | (Argentina) A. Osoro / (Spain) L. Sainz | 2 | 5
3 | (Spain) B. González / (Argentina) D. Brea | 6 | 7
10 | (France) A. Collombon / (Spain) V. Iglesias | 6 | 3
5 | (Spain) Mapi / (Spain) Majo | 7 | 6
8 | (Spain) J. Castelló / (Portugal) S. Araújo | 4 | 1
2 | (Spain) G. Triay / (Spain) M. Ortega | 6 | 6

Semifinals
1 | (Spain) A.Sánchez / (Spain) P. Josemaria | 6
3 | (Spain) B. González / (Argentina) D. Brea | 3 | 2
5 | (Spain) Mapi / (Spain) Majo | 2 | 2
2 | (Spain) Triay / (Spain) M. Ortega | 6 | 6

Final
1 | (Spain) Josemaria / (Spain) Sánchez | 3 | 6 | 5
2 | (Spain) G. Triay / (Spain) M. Ortega | 6 | 3 | 7

== Results ==
=== First Round ===
Men's

| Date | Winners | Score | Opponent | Refs. |
|---|---|---|---|---|
| 10/7/2023 | (Spain) Pablo Cardona (Spain) Pincho Fernandéz | 4–6 / 6–1 / 6–1 | (Italy) Marco Cassetta (Italy) Simone Cremona | |
| 10/7/2023 | (Spain) Rafael Mendez (Spain) Toni Bueno | 3–6 / 7–5 / 6–1 | (Spain) Adriá Mercadal (Spain) Ruben Rivera | |
| 10/7/2023 | (Argentina) Agustín Gutiérrez (Spain) José Rico | 6–3 / 6–4 | (Italy) Enzo Jensen Sirvent (Italy) Cristian Jensen Sirvent | |
| 11/7/2023 | (Spain) Alejandro Arroyo (Spain) Gonzalo Rubio | 6–3 / 6–4 | (Spain) Arnau Ayats (Spain) Francisco Guerrero | |
| 11/7/2023 | (Chile) Javier Valdes (Spain) Jose David Sanchez Serrano | 6–3 / 7–6 | (Spain) Carlos Perez Cabeza (Argentina) Emiliano iriart | |
| 10/7/2023 | (Spain) Antonio Luque (Spain) Jose Luis Gonzalez | 6–1 / 6–4 | (Italy) Giulio Graziotti (Italy) Riccardo Sinicropi | |
| 11/7/2023 | (Argentina) Cristian German Gutiérrez (Spain) Mario Huete | 6–4 / 4–6 / 6–1 | (Spain) Sergio Alba (Spain) Sergio Icardo | |
| 10/7/2023 | (Spain) Mario Castillo (Spain) Miguel Benítez | 6–3 / 6–4 | (Argentina) Nicolás Suescun (Spain) Pablo García Rodrigo | |
| 10/7/2023 | (Spain) Euadrdo Alonso (Spain) Juanlu Esbri | 3–6 / 6–2 / 6–4 | (Argentina) Juan Cruz Belluati (Spain) Javi Ruiz | |
| 11/7/2023 | (Spain) Francisco Gil Morales (Argentina) Ramiro Moyano | 1–6 / 6–4 / 6–0 | (Spain) Diego Gil Batista (Spain) Ignacio Sager | |
| 11/7/2023 | (Spain) Iván Ramirez (Spain) Jaime Muñoz | 7–6 / 6–3 | (Spain) Fran Ramirez (France) Jeremy Scatena | |
| 10/7/2023 | (Italy) Daniele Cattaneo (Italy) Lorenzo Di Giovanni | 6–4 / 6–4 | (France) Jerome Inzerillo (France) Maxime Moreau | |
| 10/7/2023 | (Spain) Jairo Bautista (Spain) Juan Martín Díaz | 6–4 / 6–2 | (Spain) Aitor Garcia Bassas (Spain) Pedro Vera Castillo | |
| 11/7/2023 | (Argentina) Alex Chozas (Spain) Jose Solano Marmolejo | 6–3 / 5–7 / 1–0 | (Spain) Miguel Gonzalez García (Spain) Miguel Solbes | |
| 11/7/2023 | (Brazil) Lucas Campagnolo (Spain) Javi Garrido | 7–6 / 7–5 | (Spain) Enique Goenaga (Spain) Luis Hernandez Quesada | |
| 10/7/2023 | (Brazil) Lucas Bergamini (Spain) Victor Ruiz | 7–6 / 6–4 | (Spain) Ignacio Vilariñob (Spain) Salvador Oria | |
| 10/7/2023 | (Spain) Jaime Fermosell (Spain) Raúl Marcos Durán | 6–7 / 6–1 / 6–4 | (Spain) Carlos Marti (Spain) Mario Ortega | |
| 10/7/2023 | (Italy) Denis Perino (Argentina) Miguel Lamperti | 6–4 / 6–2 | (Argentina) Federico Mouriño (Argentina) Ignacio Piotto | |
| 10/7/2023 | (Spain) Alvaro Melendez Amaya (Spain) Pedro Melendez Amaya | 6–4 / 6–0 | (Spain) Gaspar Campos (Spain) J.M. Mouliaa Lopez | |
| 11/7/2023 | (Spain) Javier Martinez Vazquez (Spain) Jorge Ruiz | 6–4 / 7–6 | (Italy) Aris Patiniotis (Spain) Emilio Sanchez Chamero | |
| 11/7/2023 | (Argentina) Lucho Capra (Argentina) Maxi Sánchez | 6–4 / 7–6 | (Spain) Alvaro Cepéro (Argentina) Facundo Dominguez | |
| 11/7/2023 | (Spain) Coki Nieto (Spain) Jon Sanz | 6–3 / 6–3 | (Spain) Anton Sans (Spain) Teodoro Zapata | |
| 11/7/2023 | (Spain) Miguel Semmler (Spain) Pablo Lijó | 6–3 7–5 | (France) Benjamin Tison (Spain) Victor Mena Gil | |
| 10/7/2023 | (Spain) Javi Leal (Spain) Jose Garcia Diestro | 6–0 / 6–2 | (Argentina) Leo Augsburger (Spain) Javi Rico | |

Women's

| Date | Winners | Score | Opponent | Refs. |
|---|---|---|---|---|
| 11/7/2023 | (Spain) Alejandra Alonso (Spain) Andrea Ustero Prieto | 6–2 / 6–7 / 6–3 | (Spain) Ana Dominguez Gracia (Spain) Lucia Perez Parra | |
| 11/7/2023 | (Spain) Elisabeth Amatriain (Spain) Sofía Saiz | 6–1 / 6–4 | (Spain) Beatriz Caldera (Spain) Marta Barrera | |
| 11/7/2023 | (Spain) Araceli Martinez (Spain) Teresa Navarro | 6–1 / 6–2 | (Spain) Martina Fassio (Spain) Sandra Hernandez | |
| 11/7/2023 | (Italy) Emily Stellato (Italy) Giulia Sussarello | 6–1 / 6–1 | (Italy) Lorena Vano (Spain) Lucía Peralta | |
| 11/7/2023 | (Spain) Letizia Manquillo (Portugal) Patricia Ribeiro | 7–6 / 6–1 | (Netherlands) Marcella Koek (Netherlands) Steffie Weterings | |
| 11/7/2023 | (Spain) Marta Caparros (France) Lea Godallier | 6–2 / 6–3 | (Spain) Agueda Perez Ortiz (Spain) Sara Ruiz Soto | |
| 11/7/2023 | (Spain) Lorena Alonso (Spain) Lourdes Pascual | 6–3 / 4–6 / 6–3 | (Russia) Ksenia Sharifova (Spain) Marta Borrero | |
| 11/7/2023 | (Spain) Jimena Velasco (Spain) Noa Canovas | 6–1 / 6–2 | (Spain) Arantxa Soriano (Spain) Sandra Bellver | |
| 11/7/2023 | (Portugal) Ana Catarina Nogueira (Spain) Melania Merino | 6–2 / 6–2 | (Brazil) Manuela Schuck (Spain) Maria Pinacho | |
| 11/7/2023 | (Spain) Lara Arruabarrena (Spain) Sara Pujals | 6–4 / 6–7 / 6–1 | (Italy) Caterina Baldi (Italy) Valentina Tommasi | |
| 11/7/2023 | (Italy) Carlotta Casali (Spain) Julia Polo Bautista | 6–3 / 6–3 | (Spain) Alba Perez Momha (Spain) Lucía García Trella | |
| 11/7/2023 | (Spain) Ana Fernandez de Osso (Spain) Laia Rodriguez Abajo | 6–2 / 7–6 | (Portugal) Catarina Castro Vilela (Italy) Francesca Ligotti | |
| 11/7/2023 | (Spain) Ariadna Cañellas (Spain) Carla Mesa | 6–2 / 6–3 | (Spain) Carla Fitó (Spain) Cristina Gonzalez Moro | |
| 11/7/2023 | (Italy) Chiara Pappacena (Italy) Giorgia Marchetti | 6–4 / 6–3 | (Spain) Patricia Martinez Fortun (Spain) Xenia Clasca | |
| 11/7/2023 | (Spain) Alicia Blanco Rojo (Spain) Noemí Aguilar | 6–2 / 6–0 | (Spain) Mireia Herrada (Spain) Mónica Gómez Rivas | |
| 11/7/2023 | (Spain) Carmen Castillon (Spain) Nuria Vivancos | 6–2 / 6–3 | (Spain) Ana Varo Ramos (Spain) Carmen Pardo | |

=== Round of 32 ===
Men's

| Date | Winners | Score | Opponent | Refs. |
|---|---|---|---|---|
| 12/7/2023 | (Spain) Alejandro Galán (Spain) Juan Lebrón | 6–2 / 6–3 | (Spain) Pablo Cardona (Spain) Pincho Fernandéz | |
| 12/7/2023 | (Argentina) Agustín Gutiérrez (Spain) José Rico | 6–3 / 3–6 / 6–2 | (Spain) Rafael Mendez (Spain) Toni Bueno | |
| 12/7/2023 | (Spain) Alejandro Arroyo (Spain) Gonzalo Rubio | 7–6 / 6–3 | (Chile) Javier Valdes (Spain) Jose David Sanchez Serrano | |
| 12/7/2023 | (Argentina) Fernando Belasteguín (Spain) Miguel Yanguas | 6–4 / 6–4 | (Spain) Antonio Luque (Spain) Jose Luis Gonzalez | |
| 12/7/2023 | (Spain) Alex Ruiz (Argentina) Juan Tello | 7–6 / 6–4 | (Argentina) Cristian German Gutiérrez (Spain) Mario Huete | |
| 12/7/2023 | (Spain) Mario Castillo (Spain) Miguel Benítez | 6–4 / 6–4 | (Spain) Euadrdo Alonso (Spain) Juanlu Esbri | |
| 12/7/2023 | (Spain) Iván Ramirez (Spain) Jaime Muñoz | 4–6 / 6–4 / 6–4 | (Spain) Francisco Gil Morales (Argentina) Ramiro Moyano | |
| 12/7/2023 | (Argentina) Federico Chingotto (Spain) Paquito Navarro | 6–2 / 6–2 | (Italy) Daniele Cattaneo (Italy) Lorenzo Di Giovanni | |
| 12/7/2023 | (Argentina) Agustin Tapia (Spain) Arturo Coello | 6–3 / 6–3 | (Spain) Jairo Bautista (Spain) Juan Martín Díaz | |
| 12/7/2023 | (Argentina) Alex Chozas (Spain) Jose Solano Marmolejo | W.O. | (Brazil) Lucas Campagnolo (Spain) Javi Garrido | |
| 12/7/2023 | (Brazil) Lucas Bergamini (Spain) Victor Ruiz | 7–6 / 6–2 | (Spain) Jaime Fermosell (Spain) Raúl Marcos Durán | |
| 12/7/2023 | (Italy) Denis Perino (Argentina) Miguel Lamperti | 7–6 / 6–4 | (Spain) Momo Gonzalez (Argentina) Sanyo Gutierrez | |
| 12/7/2023 | (Spain) Alvaro Melendez Amaya (Spain) Pedro Melendez Amaya | 6–2 / 5–7 / 6–0 | (Argentina) Agustin Gomez Silingo (Brazil) Pablo Lima | |
| 12/7/2023 | (Argentina) Lucho Capra (Argentina) Maxi Sánchez | 6–2 / 6–4 | (Spain) Javier Martinez Vazquez (Spain) Jorge Ruiz | |
| 12/7/2023 | (Spain) Coki Nieto (Spain) Jon Sanz | 3–6 / 6–4 / 7–6 | (Spain) Miguel Semmler (Spain) Pablo Lijó | |
| 12/7/2023 | (Argentina) Franco Stupaczuk (Argentina) Martin Di Nenno | 4–6 / 6–3 / 7–6 | (Spain) Javi Leal (Spain) Jose Garcia Diestro | |

Women's

| Date | Winners | Score | Opponent | Refs. |
|---|---|---|---|---|
| 12/7/2023 | (Spain) Ariana Sánchez (Spain) Paula Josemaria | 6–0 / 6–3 | (Spain) Alejandra Alonso (Spain) Andrea Ustero Prieto | |
| 12/7/2023 | (Spain) Carmen Goenaga (Spain) Lucía Martinez | 6–3 / 6–4 | (Spain) Elisabeth Amatriain (Spain) Sofía Saiz | |
| 12/7/2023 | (Spain) Esther Carnicero (Spain) Maria Carmen Villalba | 7–5 / 6–4 | (Spain) Araceli Martinez (Spain) Teresa Navarro | |
| 12/7/2023 | (Argentina) Claudia Jensen (Spain) Veronica Virseda | 6–2 / 6–2 | (Italy) Emily Stellato (Italy) Giulia Sussarello | |
| 12/7/2023 | (Argentina) Aranzazu Osoro (Spain) Lucía Sainz | 6–1 / 6–0 | (Spain) Letizia Manquillo (Portugal) Patricia Ribeiro | |
| 12/7/2023 | (Spain) Lorena Rufo (Spain) Marina Martinez | 6–2 / 4–6 / 6–3 | (Spain) Marta Caparros (France) Lea Godallier | |
| 12/7/2023 | (Sweden) Carolina Navarro (Spain) Marina Guinart | 6–1 / 6–4 | (Spain) Lorena Alonso (Spain) Lourdes Pascual | |
| 12/7/2023 | (Spain) Bea González (Argentina) Delfina Brea | 6–2 / 6–1 | (Spain) Jimena Velasco (Spain) Noa Canovas | |
| 12/7/2023 | (Portugal) Ana Catarina Nogueira (Spain) Melania Merino | 6–1 / 3–6 / 6–4 | (Spain) Marta Arellano (Spain) Rebeca López | |
| 12/7/2023 | (France) Alix Collombon (Spain) Victoria Iglesias | 6–3 / 6–1 | (Spain) Lara Arruabarrena (Spain) Sara Pujals | |
| 12/7/2023 | (Italy) Carolina Orsi (Spain) Patricia Llaguno | 6–1 / 6–1 | (Italy) Carlotta Casali (Spain) Julia Polo Bautista | |
| 12/7/2023 | (Spain) María Pilar Sánchez Alayeto (Spain) María José Sánchez Alayeto | 6–4 / 6–1 | (Spain) Ana Fernandez de Osso (Spain) Laia Rodriguez Abajo | |
| 12/7/2023 | (Spain) Jessica Castelló (Portugal) Sofia Araújo | 6–2 / 6–3 | (Spain) Ariadna Cañellas (Spain) Carla Mesa | |
| 12/7/2023 | (Spain) Marta Talavan (Spain) Nuria Rodriguez | 6–4 / 6–1 | (Italy) Chiara Pappacena (Italy) Giorgia Marchetti | |
| 12/7/2023 | (Spain) Claudia Fernández (Argentina) Julieta Bidahorria | 6–3 / 6–0 | (Spain) Alicia Blanco Rojo (Spain) Noemí Aguilar | |
| 12/7/2023 | (Spain) Gemma Triay (Spain) Marta Ortega | 6–1 / 6–2 | (Spain) Carmen Castillon (Spain) Nuria Vivancos | |

=== Round of 16 ===
Men's

| Date | Winners | Score | Opponent | Refs. |
|---|---|---|---|---|
| 13/7/2023 | (Spain) Alejandro Galán; Juan Lebrón | 6–1 / 6–4 | (Argentina) Agustín Gutiérrez (Spain) José Rico | |
| 13/7/2023 | (Argentina) Fernando Belasteguín (Spain) Miguel Yanguas | 2–6 / 6–3 / 6–4 | (Spain) Alejandro Arroyo (Spain) Gonzalo Rubio | |
| 13/7/2023 | (Spain) Mario Castillo (Spain) Miguel Benítez | 7–6 / 6–2 | (Spain) Alex Ruiz (Argentina) Juan Tello | |
| 13/7/2023 | (Argentina) Federico Chingotto (Spain) Paquito Navarro | 6–3 / 6–1 | (Spain) Iván Ramirez (Spain) Jaime Muñoz | |
| 13/7/2023 | (Argentina) Agustin Tapia (Spain) Arturo Coello | 6–3 / 6–1 | (Argentina) Alex Chozas (Spain) Jose Solano Marmolejo | |
| 13/7/2023 | (Brazil) Lucas Bergamini (Spain) Victor Ruiz | 4–6 / 6–4 / 6–4 | (Italy) Denis Perino (Argentina) Miguel Lamperti | |
| 13/7/2023 | (Argentina) Lucho Capra (Argentina) Maxi Sánchez | 6–2 / 6–1 | (Spain) Alvaro Melendez Amaya (Spain) Pedro Melendez Amaya | |
| 13/7/2023 | (Argentina) Franco Stupaczuk (Argentina) Martin Di Nenno | 4–6 / 6–3 / 6–3 | (Spain) Coki Nieto (Spain) Jon Sanz | |

Women's

| Date | Winners | Score | Opponent | Refs. |
|---|---|---|---|---|
| 13/7/2023 | (Spain) Ariana Sánchez (Spain) Paula Josemaria | 6–2 / 6–1 | (Spain) Carmen Goenaga (Spain) Lucía Martinez | |
| 13/7/2023 | (Argentina) Claudia Jensen (Spain) Veronica Virseda | 6–0 / 6–2 | (Spain) Esther Carnicero (Spain) Maria Carmen Villalba | |
| 13/7/2023 | (Argentina) Aranzazu Osoro (Spain) Lucía Sainz | 6–3 / 6–1 | (Spain) Lorena Rufo (Spain) Marina Martinez | |
| 13/7/2023 | (Spain) Bea González (Argentina) Delfina Brea | 6–2 / 7–6 | (Sweden) Carolina Navarro (Spain) Marina Guinart | |
| 13/7/2023 | (France) Alix Collombon (Spain) Victoria Iglesias | 6–3 / 6–2 | (Portugal) Ana Catarina Nogueira (Spain) Melania Merino | |
| 13/7/2023 | (Spain) María Pilar Sánchez Alayeto (Spain) María José Sánchez Alayeto | 0–6 / 6–3 / 6–4 | (Italy) Carolina Orsi (Spain) Patricia Llaguno | |
| 13/7/2023 | (Spain) Jessica Castelló (Portugal) Sofia Araújo | 6–3 / 6–0 | (Spain) Marta Talavan (Spain) Nuria Rodriguez | |
| 13/7/2023 | (Spain) Gemma Triay (Spain) Marta Ortega | 6–0 / 6–1 | (Spain) Claudia Fernández (Argentina) Julieta Bidahorria | |

=== Quarter-Finals ===
Men's

| Date | Winners | Score | Opponent | Refs. |
|---|---|---|---|---|
| 14/7/2023 | (Argentina) Fernando Belasteguín (Spain) Miguel Yanguas | 6–1 / 6–3 | (Spain) Alejandro Galán (Spain) Juan Lebrón | |
| 14/7/2023 | (Argentina) Federico Chingotto (Spain) Paquito Navarro | 6–0 / 6–1 | (Spain) Mario Castillo (Spain) Miguel Benítez | |
| 14/7/2023 | (Argentina) Agustin Tapia (Spain) Arturo Coello | 6–3 / 7–6 | (Brazil) Lucas Bergamini (Spain) Victor Ruiz | |
| 14/7/2023 | (Argentina) Franco Stupaczuk (Argentina) Martin Di Nenno | 6–7 / 7–6 / 6–4 | (Argentina) Lucho Capra (Argentina) Maxi Sánchez | |

Women's

| Date | Winners | Score | Opponent | Refs. |
|---|---|---|---|---|
| 14/7/2023 | (Spain) Ariana Sánchez (Spain) Paula Josemaria | 6–1 / 5–7 / 6–1 | (Argentina) Claudia Jensen (Spain) Veronica Virseda | |
| 14/7/2023 | (Spain) Bea González (Argentina) Delfina Brea | 6–2 / 7–5 | (Argentina) Aranzazu Osoro (Spain) Lucía Sainz | |
| 14/7/2023 | (Spain) María Pilar Sánchez Alayeto (Spain) María José Sánchez Alayeto | 7–6 / 6–3 | (France) Alix Collombon (Spain) Victoria Iglesias | |
| 14/7/2023 | (Spain) Gemma Triay (Spain) Marta Ortega | 6–4 / 6–1 | (Spain) Jessica Castelló (Portugal) Sofia Araújo | |

=== Semi-Finals ===
Men's

| Date | Winners | Score | Opponent | Refs. |
|---|---|---|---|---|
| 15/7/2023 | (Argentina) Federico Chingotto (Spain) Paquito Navarro | 6–1 / 6–2 | (Argentina) Fernando Belasteguín (Spain) Miguel Yanguas | |
| 15/7/2023 | (Argentina) Agustin Tapia (Spain) Arturo Coello | 6–2 / 6–3 | (Argentina) Franco Stupaczuk (Argentina) Martin Di Nenno | |

Women's

| Date | Winners | Score | Opponent | Refs. |
|---|---|---|---|---|
| 15/7/2023 | (Spain) Ariana Sánchez (Spain) Paula Josemaria | 6–3 / 6–2 | (Spain) Bea González (Argentina) Delfina Brea | |
| 15/7/2023 | (Spain) Gemma Triay (Spain) Marta Ortega | 6–2 / 6–2 | (Spain) María Pilar Sánchez Alayeto (Spain) María José Sánchez Alayeto | |

=== Finals ===
Men's

| Date | Winners | Score | Opponent | Refs. |
|---|---|---|---|---|
| 16/7/2023 | (Argentina) Agustin Tapia (Spain) Arturo Coello | 7–5 / 7–6 | (Argentina) Federico Chingotto (Spain) Paquito Navarro | |

Women's

| Date | Winners | Score | Opponent | Refs. |
|---|---|---|---|---|
| 16/7/2023 | (Spain) Gemma Triay (Spain) Marta Ortega | 6–3 / 3–6 / 7–5 | (Spain) Ariana Sánchez (Spain) Paula Josemaria | |

== Points distribution ==
Below is a series of tables showing the ranking points and money a player can earn.

| Event | First round | Second Round | Round of 16 | QF | SF | F | W |
| Points | 40 | 90 | 180 | 360 | 750 | 1200 | 2000 |
| Money | €1500 | €2900 | €5250 | €8500 | €13000 | €23600 | €47300 |
