= 2023 Milano P1 =

Padel championships

- Date: 2 – 10 December
- Edition: 2nd
- Category: P1
- Prize money: € 300,000
- Location: Milan, Italy
- Venue: Allianz Cloud Arena

Champions
- Men's doubles: (Spain) Alejandro Galán (Spain) Juan Lebrón
- Women's doubles: (Argentina) Delfina Brea (Spain) Beatriz Gonzalez

Chronology
Previous
Mexico Open (WPT)
Next
Master Final (WPT)

The 2023 Milano P1 was the sixth and final tournament of the second season organized by Premier Padel, promoted by the International Padel Federation, and with the financial backing of Nasser Al-Khelaïfi's Qatar Sports Investments.

In the women's final, FIP number 3 ranked team, Beatriz Gonzalez and Delfina Brea reached their ninth final of the season, and after defeating Maria Pilar Sánchez and María José Sánchez, FIP number 4 ranked team, won their second tournament together as pair in Premier Padel tournament (and their seventh overall).

In the men's final, Alejandro Galán and Juan Lebrón, FIP number 1 ranked team, defeated Franco Stupaczuk and Martin Di Nenno, FIP number 3 ranked team, winning their fifth tournament since Lebrón returned eight tournaments before.

== Relevant Data ==
By failing to win the tournament, for the first time in 27 years, Fernando Belasteguín did not win a single tournament during the season. The Argentine had won at least one title per season since 1996.

Despite exiting in the semi-finals, the result was enough for Arturo Coello to finish the season ranked first, ending the year with 15 out of 28 tournaments won and at the top of the rankings in both the World Padel Tour and Premier Padel.

== Seeds ==
Male

| Rnk. | Team | FIP Ranking Points |
|---|---|---|
| 1 | (Spain) Alejandro Galán (Spain) Juan Lebrón | 24400 |
| 2 | (Argentina) Agustín Tapia (Spain) Arturo Coello | 22640 |
| 3 | (Argentina) Franco Stupaczuk (Argentina) Martin Di Nenno | 19405 |
| 4 | (Argentina) Federico Chingotto (Spain) Paquito Navarro | 18780 |
| 5 | (Argentina) Fernando Belasteguín (Spain) Mike Yanguas | 11705 |
| 6 | (Spain) Aléx Ruiz (Argentina) Juan Tello | 10115 |
| 7 | (Spain) Javi Garrido (Spain) Momo Gonzalez | 7197 |
| 8 | (Argentina) Agustin Gutiérrez (Argentina) Sanyo Gutiérrez | 6715 |

Female

| Rnk. | Team | FIP Ranking Points |
|---|---|---|
| 1 | (Spain) Ariana Sanchez (Spain) Paula Josemaria | 26080 |
| 2 | (Spain) Gemma Triay (Spain) Marta Ortega | 19440 |
| 3 | (Spain) Beatriz Gonzalez (Argentina) Delfina Brea | 15490 |
| 4 | (Spain) Alejandra Salazar (Portugal) Sofia Araújo | 10850 |
| 5 | (Spain) Tamara Icardo (Argentina) Virginia Riera | 7970 |
| 6 | (Argentina) Aranzazu Osoro (Spain) Jessica Castellò | 7135 |
| 7 | (Argentina) Lucía Sainz (Spain) Patricia Llaguno | 5850 |
| 8 | (Argentina) Claudia Jensen (Spain) Veronica Virseda | 5800 |

== Draws ==
=== Men's Draw ===
Round of 32
1 | (Spain) Galán / (Spain) Lebrón | 6 | 6
(Spain) J. Ruiz / (Spain) P. Cardona | 3 | 4
(Spain) I. Jofre / (Spain) L.H. Quesada | 3 | 7 | 3
13 | (Spain) G. Rubio / (Spain) P. Fernandez | 6 | 5 | 6
14 | (Spain) A. Arroyo / (Spain) E. Alonso | 6 | 6
(Spain) A. Ayats / (Argentina) J.C. Belluati | 2 | 1
(Spain) J. Rico / (Spain) R. Mendez | 6 | 4 | 6
8 | (Argentina) A. Gutiérrez / (Argentina) Sanyo | 3 | 6 | 2
6 | (Spain) A. Ruiz / (Argentina) J. Tello | 7 | 7
(France) B. Tison / (Spain) A. Garcia | 6 | 6
(Spain) J.G. Barahona / (Spain) J.G. Mora | 6 | 6
11 | (Spain) F. Gil / (Argentina) R. Moyano | 2 | 0
15 | (Brazil) L. Bergamini / (Spain) V. Ruiz | 6 | 6
(Spain) E. Goenaga / (Spain) J. Martinez | 3 | 3
(Italy) A. Patiniotis / (Italy) F. Dominguez | 2 | 4
4 | (Argentina) Chingotto / (Spain) Paquito | 6 | 6
3 | (Argentina) F. Stupaczuk / (Argentina) Di Nenno | 5 | 7 | 6
(Spain) J.J. Casas / (Argentina) M. Lamperti | 7 | 5 | 1
(Spain) J. Bautista / (Spain) J. Munoz | 6 | 7
12 | (Argentina) A. Chozas / (Argentina) L. Capra | 1 | 6
16 | (Argentina) A. Silingo / (Argentina) F. Mouriño | 3 | 0
(Spain) F. Guerrero / (Spain) T. Zapata | 6 | 3 | *
(Spain) M. Quilez / (Spain) T. Bueno | 4 | 4
5 | (Argentina) Belasteguín / (Spain) Yanguas | 6 | 6
7 | (Spain) J. Garrido / (Spain) Momo | 6 | 6
(Spain) A. Cépero / (Spain) P. Lijo | 2 | 3
(Spain) J. Rico / (Spain) M. Benitez | 6 | 6 | 3
15 | (Brazil) L. Campagnolo / (Spain) J. Esbri | 3 | 7 | 6
10 | (Spain) Coki / (Spain) J. Sanz | 6 | 6
(Italy) D. Perino / (Spain) J. Ruiz | 2 | 1
(Spain) I. Gestoso / (Spain) S. Oria | 5 | 2
2 | (Spain) Coello / (Argentina) Tapia | 7 | 6

Round of 16
1 | (Spain) Galán / (Spain) Lebrón | 6 | 6
13 | (Spain) G. Rubio / (Spain) P. Fernandez | 1 | 1
14 | (Spain) A. Arroyo / (Spain) G. Rubio | 4 | 4
(Spain) J. Rico / (Spain) R. Mendez | 6 | 6
6 | (Spain) A. Ruiz / (Argentina) J. Tello | 7 | 6
(Spain) J.G. Barahona / (Spain) J.G. Mora | 5 | 0
15 | (Brazil) L. Bergamini / (Spain) V. Ruiz | 2 | 3
4 | (Argentina) Chingotto / (Spain) Paquito | 6 | 6
3 | (Argentina) F. Stupaczuk / (Argentina) Di Nenno | 6 | 6
19 | (Spain) J. Bautista / (Spain) J. Munoz | 4 | 3
(Spain) F. Guerrero / (Spain) T. Zapata | *
5 | (Argentina) Belasteguín / (Spain) Yanguas
7 | (Spain) J. Garrido / (Spain) Momo | 6 | 6
15 | (Brazil) L. Campagnolo / (Spain) J. Esbri | 4 | 2
10 | (Spain) Coki / (Spain) J. Sanz | 4 | 4
2 | (Spain) Coello / (Argentina) Tapia | 6 | 6

Quarterfinals
1 | (Spain) Galán / (Spain) Lebrón | 6 | 6
(Spain) J. Rico / (Spain) R. Mendez | 2 | 3
6 | (Spain) A. Ruiz / (Argentina) J. Tello | 2 | 5
4 | (Argentina) Chingotto / (Spain) Navarro | 6 | 7
3 | (Argentina) F. Stupaczuk / (Argentina) Di Nenno | 6 | 6
(Spain) F. Guerrero / (Spain) T. Zapata | 4 | 2
7 | (Spain) Momo / (Spain) J. Garrido | 5 | 6 | 5
2 | (Spain) Coello / (Argentina) Tapia | 7 | 3 | 7

Semifinals
1 | (Spain) Galán / (Spain) Lebrón | 6 | 5 | 6
4 | (Argentina) Chingotto / (Spain) Navarro | 3 | 7 | 2
3 | (Argentina) F. Stupaczuk / (Argentina) Di Nenno | 6 | 6
2 | (Spain) Coello / (Argentina) Tapia | 4 | 4

Final
1 | (Spain) Galán / (Spain) Lebrón | 7 | 6 | 7
3 | (Argentina) F. Stupaczuk / (Argentina) Di Nenno | 6 | 7 | 6

=== Women's Draw ===
Round of 32
1 | (Spain) A. Sánchez / (Spain) P. Josemaria | 6 | 6
(Spain) M.R. Abajo / (Spain) S. Bellver | 3 | 1
(Spain) M. Talavan / (Spain) N. Rodriguez | 6 | 6
(Spain) A.F. De Osso / (Spain) M. Villalba | 0 | 1
(Spain) A. Alonso / (Spain) A. Ustero | 6 | 6
Q | (Spain) J. Bautista / (Portugal) P. Ribeiro | 0 | 1
(France) Collombon / (Spain) L. Rufo | 2 | 2
5 | (Spain) T. Icardo / (Argentina) V. Riera | 6 | 6
8 | (Argentina) C. Jensen / (Spain) V. Virseda | 6 | 5 | *
(Spain) C. Fernandez / (Spain) V. Iglesias | 4 | 3
(Spain) A. Martinez / (Spain) S. Ruiz | 2 | 6
(Italy) C. Casali / (Italy) E. Stellato | 6 | 7
Q | (Spain) X. Vidiella / (Brazil) R. Piltcher | 7 | 5 | 6
(Spain) R. Aguilar / (Spain) M. Navarro | 6 | 7 | 3
(Spain) B. Sanchez / (Portugal) Nogueira | 1 | 2
3 | (Spain) B. González / (Argentina) D. Brea | 6 | 6
4 | (Spain) A. Salazar / (Portugal) S. Araújo | 6 | 6
(Sweden) C. Navarro / (Spain) M. Martinez | 3 | 0
WC | (Italy) C. Pappacena / (Italy) G. Marchetti | 1 | 4
(Spain) M. Barrera / (Spain) M. Merino | 6 | 6
(Spain) M. Caparros / (Spain) M. Goyenche | 6 | 4
(Spain) C. Mesa / (Italy) C. Orsi | 7 | 6
(Spain) L. Arruabarrena/ (Spain) S. Saiz | 6 | 3 | 1
7 | (Spain) L. Sainz / (Spain) P. Llaguno | 2 | 6 | 6
6 | (Argentina) A. Osoro / (Spain) J. Castelló | 6 | 6 | 6
(Spain) A. Cañellas / (Spain) N. Carrillo | 2 | 7 | 3
(Spain) A. Soriano / (Spain) S. Pujals | 3 | 1
Q | (Spain) A. Perez / (Spain) P. Martinez | 6 | 6
(Spain) J. Velasco / (Spain) N. Canovas | 3 | 7 | 6
(Spain) M. Borrero / (Russia) K. Sharifova | 6 | 5 | 2
(Spain) C. Goenaga / (Spain) L. Martinez | 6 | 6
2 | (Spain) G. Triay / (Spain) M. Ortega | 2 | 4

Round of 16
1 | (Spain) A. Sánchez / (Spain) Josemaria | 6 | 6
(Spain) M. Talavan / (Spain) N. Rodriguez | 0 | 1
(Spain) A. Alonso / (Spain) A. Ustero | 3 | 6 | 1
5 | (Spain) T. Icardo / (Argentina) V. Riera | 6 | 1 | 6
8 | (Argentina) C. Jensen / (Spain) V. Virseda | 6 | 6
(Italy) C. Casali/ (Italy) E. Stellato | 0 | 2
Q | (Spain) X. Vidiella/ (Brazil) R. Piltcher | 0 | 0
3 | (Spain) B. González / (Argentina) D. Brea | 6 | 6
4 | (Spain) A. Salazar / (Portugal) S. Araújo | 6 | 6
(Spain) M. Barrera / (Spain) M. Merino | 0 | 4
(Spain) C. Mesa / (Italy) C. Orsi | 6 | 2
7 | (Spain) L. Sainz / (Spain) P. Llaguno | 7 | 6
6 | (Argentina) A. Osoro / (Spain) J. Castelló | 6 | 6 | 6
Q | (Spain) A. Perez / (Spain) P. Martinez | 7 | 1 | 4
(Spain) J. Velasco / (Spain) N. Canovas | 4 | 4
(Spain) C. Goenaga / (Spain) L. Martinez | 6 | 6

Quarterfinals
1 | (Spain) A. Sánchez / (Spain) Josemaria | 6 | 6
5 | (Spain) T. Icardo / (Argentina) V. Riera | 3 | 3
8 | (Argentina) C. Jensen / (Spain) V. Virseda | 1 | 4
3 | (Spain) B. González / (Argentina) D. Brea | 6 | 6
4 | (Spain) A. Salazar / (Portugal) S. Araújo | 6 | 4 | 6
7 | (Spain) L. Sainz / (Spain) P. Llaguno | 2 | 6 | 1
6 | (Argentina) A. Osoro / (Spain) J. Castelló | 6 | 4 | *
(Spain) C. Goenaga / (Spain) L. Martinez | 3 | 1

Semifinals
1 | (Spain) A. Sánchez / (Spain) P. Josemaria | 4 | 6
3 | (Spain) B. González / (Argentina) D. Brea | 6 | 7
4 | (Spain) A. Salazar / (Portugal) S. Araújo | 7 | 6
6 | (Argentina) A. Osoro / (Spain) J. Castelló | 6 | 4

Final
3 | (Spain) B. González / (Argentina) Brea | 6 | 7
4 | (Spain) A. Salazar / (Portugal) S. Araújo | 0 | 6

== Results ==
=== First Round ===
| Date | Winners | Score | Opponent | Refs. |
|---|---|---|---|---|
| 4/12/2023 | (Spain) Javi Ruiz (Spain) Pablo Cardona | 6–3 / 6–4 | (Spain) Jesus Moya (Spain) Sergio Icardo | |
| 4/12/2023 | (Spain) Iñigo Jofre (Spain) Luis Hernandez Quesada | 6–1 / 6–4 | (Sweden) Daniel Windahl (Spain) Jose Solano Marmolejo | |
| 4/12/2023 | (Spain) Arnau Ayats (Argentina) Juan Cruz Belluati | 6–2 / 6–1 | (Spain) Ivan Ramirez (Spain) Pablo García Rodrigo | |
| 4/12/2023 | (Spain) Javi Rico (Spain) Rafael Mendez | 6–4 / 6–4 | (Spain) Javier Valdes (Chile) Jose David Sanchez Serrano | |
| 4/12/2023 | (Spain) Aitor Garcia Bassas (France) Benjamin Tison | 6–4 / 7–6 | (Italy) Nicolas Suescun (Spain) Victor Mena Gil | |
| 4/12/2023 | (Spain) Javier Gonzalez Barahona (Spain) Javier García Mora | 6–2 / 6–1 | (Spain) Ignacio Sager (Spain) Mario Del Castillo | |
| 4/12/2023 | (Spain) Enrique Goenaga (Spain) Javier Martinez Vazquez | 3–6 / 6–4 / 5–0 / W.O. | (Argentina) Ignacio Piotto (Spain) Miguel Solbes | |
| 4/12/2023 | (Italy) Aris Patiniotis (Italy) Facundo Dominguez | 6–2 / 6–2 | (Spain) Diego Gil Batista (Spain) Mario Huete | |
| 4/12/2023 | (Spain) Jose Jimenez Casas (Argentina) Miguel Lamperti | 6–2 / 7–5 | (Italy) Flavio Abbate (Spain) Marco Cassetta | |
| 4/12/2023 | (Spain) Jaime Munoz (Spain) Jairo Bautista | 7–6 / 6–0 | (Spain) Ferran Insa Sotillo (France) Thomas Leygue | |
| 4/12/2023 | (Spain) Francisco Guerrero (Spain) Teodor Zapata | 7–5 / 6–1 | (Italy) Lorenzo Di Giovanni (Italy) Simone Cremona | |
| 4/12/2023 | (Spain) Marc Quilez (Spain) Toni Bueno | 6–4 / 4–6 / 6–2 | (Spain) Alonso Rodriguez Martinez (Portugal) Pedro Araújo | |
| 4/12/2023 | (Spain) Alvaro Cépero (Spain) Pablo Lijó | 6–3 / 6–4 | (Italy) Giulio Graziotti (Italy) Riccardo Sinicropi | |
| 4/12/2023 | (Spain) Jose Rico (Spain) Miguel Benitez | 6–7 / 6–4 / 7–6 | (Spain) Antonio Luque (Spain) Jose Luis Gonzalez | |
| 4/12/2023 | (Italy) Denis Perino (Spain) Jorge Ruiz Gutierrez | 6–2 / 6–1 | (Spain) Alvaro Melendez Amaya (Spain) Pedro Melendez Amaya | |
| 4/12/2023 | (Spain) Ignacio Vilariño (Spain) Salvador Oria | 6–2 / 6–4 | (Spain) Emilio Sanchez Chamero (Spain) Raul Marcos Duran | |

=== Round of 32 ===
Men's

| Date | Winners | Score | Opponent | Refs. |
|---|---|---|---|---|
| 6/12/2023 | (Spain) Alejandro Galán (Spain) Juan Lebrón | 6–3 / 6–4 | (Spain) Javi Ruiz (Spain) Pablo Cardona | |
| 6/12/2023 | (Spain) Gonzalo Rubio (Spain) Pincho Fernandez | 6–3 / 5–7 / 6–3 | (Spain) Iñigo Jofre (Spain) Luis Hernandez Quesada | |
| 5/12/2023 | (Spain) Alejandro Arroyo (Spain) Eduardo Alonso | 6–2 / 6–1 | (Spain) Arnau Ayats (Argentina) Juan Cruz Belluati | |
| 5/12/2023 | (Spain) Javi Rico (Spain) Rafael Mendez | 6–3 / 4–6 / 6–2 | (Argentina) Agustin Gutierrez (Argentina) Sanyo Gutiérrez | |
| 6/12/2023 | (Spain) Alex Ruiz (Argentina) Juan Tello | 7–6 / 7–6 | (Spain) Aitor Garcia Bassas (France) Benjamin Tison | |
| 6/12/2023 | (Spain) Javier Gonzalez Barahona (Spain) Javier García Mora | 6–0 / 6–2 | (Spain) Francisco Gil Morales (Argentina) Ramiro Moyano | |
| 5/12/2023 | (Brazil) Lucas Bergamini (Spain) Víctor Ruiz | 6–3 / 6–3 | (Spain) Enrique Goenaga (Spain) Javier Martinez Vazquez | |
| 5/12/2023 | (Argentina) Federico Chingotto (Spain) Paquito Navarro | 6–2 / 6–4 | (Italy) Aris Patiniotis (Italy) Facundo Dominguez | |
| 6/12/2023 | (Argentina) Franco Stupaczuk (Argentina) Martin Di Nenno | 5–7 / 7–5 / 6–1 | (Spain) Jose Jimenez Casas (Argentina) Miguel Lamperti | |
| 5/12/2023 | (Spain) Jaime Munoz (Spain) Jairo Bautista | 6–1 / 7–6 | (Argentina) Alex Chozas (Argentina) Lucho Capra | |
| 6/12/2023 | (Spain) Francisco Guerrero (Spain) Teodor Zapata | 6–3 / 3–0 / W.O. | (Argentina) Agustin Gomez Silingo (Argentina) Federico Mouriño | |
| 6/12/2023 | (Argentina) Fernando Belasteguín (Spain) Miguel Yanguas | 6–4 / 6–4 | (Spain) Marc Quilez (Spain) Toni Bueno | |
| 5/12/2023 | (Spain) Javi Garrido (Spain) Momo Gonzalez | 6–2 / 6–3 | (Spain) Alvaro Cépero (Spain) Pablo Lijó | |
| 5/12/2023 | (Spain) Juanlu Esbri (Brazil) Lucas Campagnolo | 3–6 / 7–6 / 6–3 | (Spain) Jose Rico (Spain) Miguel Benitez | |
| 5/12/2023 | (Spain) Coki Nieto (Spain) Jon Sanz | 6–2 / 6–1 | (Italy) Denis Perino (Spain) Jorge Ruiz Gutierrez | |
| 6/12/2023 | (Argentina) Agustín Tapia (Argentina) Arturo Coello | 7–5 / 6–2 | (Spain) Ignacio Vilariño (Spain) Salvador Oria | |

Women's

| Date | Winners | Score | Opponent | Refs. |
|---|---|---|---|---|
| 6/12/2023 | (Spain) Ariana Sánchez (Spain) Paula Josemaria | 6–3 / 6–1 | (Spain) Laia Rodriguez Abajo (Spain) Sandra Bellver | |
| 6/12/2023 | (Spain) Marta Talavan (Spain) Nuria Rodriguez | 6–0 / 6–1 | (Spain) Ana Fernandez de Ossó (Spain) Mari Carmen Villalba | |
| 5/12/2023 | (Spain) Alejandra Alonso (Spain) Andrea Ustero | 6–0 / 6–1 | (Spain) Julia Polo Bautista (Portugal) Patricia Maria Ribeiro | |
| 5/12/2023 | (Spain) Tamara Icardo (Argentina) Virginia Riera | 6–2 / 6–2 | (France) Alix Collombon (Spain) Lorena Rufo | |
| 6/12/2023 | (Argentina) Claudia Jensen (Spain) Veronica Virseda | 6–4 / 5–3 / W.O. | (Spain) Claudia Fernandez (Spain) Victoria Iglesias | |
| 6/12/2023 | (Italy) Carlotta Casali (Italy) Emily Stellato | 6–2 / 7–6 | (Spain) Araceli Martinez (Spain) Sara Ruiz | |
| 5/12/2023 | (Spain) Xenia Clasca (Brazil) Raquel Piltcher | 7–6 / 5–7 / 6–3 | (Spain) Marta Navarro (Spain) Raquel Segura Aguilar | |
| 5/12/2023 | (Spain) Bea González (Argentina) Delfina Brea | 6–1 / 6–2 | (Portugal) Ana Catarina Nogueira (Spain) Beatriz Caldera | |
| 5/12/2023 | (Spain) Alejandra Salazar (Portugal) Sofia Araújo | 6–3 / 6–0 | (Sweden) Carolina Navarro (Spain) Marina Martinez Lobo | |
| 5/12/2023 | (Spain) Marta Barrera (Spain) Melania Merino | 6–1 / 6–4 | (Italy) Giorgia Marchetti (Italy) Chiara Pappacena | |
| 6/12/2023 | (Spain) Carla Mesa (Italy) Carolina Orsi | 7–6 / 6–4 | (Spain) Marta Caparros (Spain) Martina Fassio | |
| 6/12/2023 | (Spain) Lucía Sainz (Spain) Patty Llaguno | 2–6 / 6–3 / 6–1 | (Spain) Lara Arruabarrena (Spain) Sofia Saiz | |
| 5/12/2023 | (Argentina) Aranzazu Osoro (Spain) Jessica Castelló | 6–2 / 6–7 / 6–3 | (Spain) Ariadna Cañellas (Spain) Noemi Aguilar | |
| 5/12/2023 | (Spain) Agueda Perez (Spain) Patricia Martínez Fortun | 6–3 / 6–1 | (Spain) Arantxa Soriano (Spain) Sara Pujals | |
| 6/12/2023 | (Spain) Noa Canovas (Spain) Jimena Velasco | 3–6 / 7–5 / 6–2 | (Spain) Marta Borrero (Russia) Ksenia Sharifova | |
| 6/12/2023 | (Spain) Carmen Goenaga (Spain) Lucía Martinez | 6–2 / 6–4 | (Spain) Gemma Triay (Spain) Marta Ortega | |

=== Round of 16 ===
Men's

| Date | Winners | Score | Opponent | Refs. |
|---|---|---|---|---|
| 7/12/2023 | (Spain) Alejandro Galán (Spain) Juan Lebrón | 6–1 / 6–1 | (Spain) Gonzalo Rubio (Spain) Pincho Fernandez | |
| 7/12/2023 | (Spain) Javi Rico (Spain) Rafael Mendez | 6–4 / 6–4 | (Spain) Alejandro Arroyo (Spain) Eduardo Alonso | |
| 7/12/2023 | (Spain) Alex Ruiz (Argentina) Juan Tello | 7–5 / 6–0 | (Spain) Javier Gonzalez Barahona (Spain) Javier García Mora | |
| 7/12/2023 | (Argentina) Federico Chingotto (Spain) Paquito Navarro | 6–2 / 6–3 | (Brazil) Lucas Bergamini (Spain) Víctor Ruiz | |
| 7/12/2023 | (Argentina) Franco Stupaczuk (Argentina) Martin Di Nenno | 6–4 / 6–3 | (Spain) Jaime Munoz (Spain) Jairo Bautista | |
| 7/12/2023 | (Spain) Francisco Guerrero (Spain) Teodor Zapata | W.O. | (Argentina) Fernando Belasteguín (Spain) Miguel Yanguas | |
| 7/12/2023 | (Spain) Javi Garrido (Spain) Momo Gonzalez | 6–4 / 6–2 | (Spain) Juanlu Esbri (Brazil) Lucas Campagnolo | |
| 7/12/2023 | (Argentina) Agustín Tapia (Argentina) Arturo Coello | 6–4 / 6–4 | (Spain) Coki Nieto (Spain) Jon Sanz | |

Women's

| Date | Winners | Score | Opponent | Refs. |
|---|---|---|---|---|
| 7/12/2023 | (Spain) Ariana Sánchez (Spain) Paula Josemaria | 6–0 / 6–1 | (Spain) Marta Talavan (Spain) Nuria Rodriguez | |
| 7/12/2023 | (Spain) Tamara Icardo (Argentina) Virginia Riera | 6–3 / 1–6 / 6–1 | (Spain) Alejandra Alonso (Spain) Andrea Ustero | |
| 7/12/2023 | (Argentina) Claudia Jensen (Spain) Veronica Virseda | 6–0 / 6–2 | (Italy) Carlotta Casali (Italy) Emily Stellato | |
| 7/12/2023 | (Spain) Bea Gonzalez (Argentina) Delfina Brea | 6–0 / 6–0 | (Spain) Xenia Clasca (Brazil) Raquel Piltcher | |
| 7/12/2023 | (Spain) Alejandra Salazar (Portugal) Sofia Araújo | 6–0 / 6–4 | (Spain) Marta Barrera (Spain) Melania Merino | |
| 7/12/2023 | (Spain) Lucía Sainz (Spain) Patty Llaguno | 7–6 / 6–2 | (Spain) Carla Mesa (Italy) Carolina Orsi | |
| 7/12/2023 | (Argentina) Aranzazu Osoro (Spain) Jessica Castelló | 6–7 / 6–1 / 6–4 | (Spain) Agueda Perez (Spain) Patricia Martínez Fortun | |
| 7/12/2023 | (Spain) Carmen Goenaga (Spain) Lucía Martinez | 6–4 / 6–4 | (Spain) Noa Canovas (Spain) Jimena Velasco | |

=== Quarter-Finals ===
Men's

| Date | Winners | Score | Opponent | Refs. |
|---|---|---|---|---|
| 8/12/2023 | (Spain) Alejandro Galán (Spain) Juan Lebrón | 6–2 / 6–3 | (Spain) Javi Rico (Spain) Rafael Mendez | |
| 8/12/2023 | (Argentina) Federico Chingotto (Spain) Paquito Navarro | 6–2 / 7–5 | (Spain) Alex Ruiz (Argentina) Juan Tello | |
| 8/12/2023 | (Argentina) Franco Stupaczuk (Argentina) Martin Di Nenno | 6–4 / 6–2 | (Spain) Francisco Guerrero (Spain) Teodor Zapata | |
| 8/12/2023 | (Argentina) Agustín Tapia (Argentina) Arturo Coello | 7–6 / 3–6 / 7–5 | (Spain) Javi Garrido (Spain) Momo Gonzale | |

Women's

| Date | Winners | Score | Opponent | Refs. |
|---|---|---|---|---|
| 8/12/2023 | (Spain) Ariana Sánchez (Spain) Paula Josemaria | 6–3 / 6–3 | (Spain) Tamara Icardo (Argentina) Virginia Riera | |
| 8/12/2023 | (Spain) Bea Gonzalez (Argentina) Delfina Brea | 6–1 / 6–4 | (Argentina) Claudia Jensen (Spain) Veronica Virseda | |
| 8/12/2023 | (Spain) Alejandra Salazar (Portugal) Sofia Araújo | 6–2 / 4–6 / 6–1 | (Spain) Lucía Sainz (Spain) Patty Llaguno | |
| 8/12/2023 | (Argentina) Aranzazu Osoro (Spain) Jessica Castelló | 6–3 / 4–1 / W.O. | (Spain) Carmen Goenaga (Spain) Lucía Martinez | |

=== Semi-Finals ===
Men's

| Date | Winners | Score | Opponent | Refs. |
|---|---|---|---|---|
| 9/12/2023 | (Spain) Alejandro Galán (Spain) Juan Lebrón | 6–3 / 5–7 / 6–2 | (Argentina) Federico Chingotto (Spain) Paquito Navarro | |
| 9/12/2023 | (Argentina) Franco Stupaczuk (Argentina) Martin Di Nenno | 6–4 / 6–4 | (Argentina) Agustín Tapia (Argentina) Arturo Coello | |

Women's

| Date | Winners | Score | Opponent | Refs. |
|---|---|---|---|---|
| 9/12/2023 | (Spain) Bea Gonzalez (Argentina) Delfina Brea | 6–4 / 7–6 | (Spain) Ariana Sánchez (Spain) Paula Josemaria | |
| 9/12/2023 | (Spain) Alejandra Salazar (Portugal) Sofia Araújo | 7–6 / 6–4 | (Argentina) Aranzazu Osoro (Spain) Jessica Castelló | |

=== Finals ===
Men's

| Date | Winners | Score | Opponent | Refs. |
|---|---|---|---|---|
| 10/12/2023 | (Spain) Alejandro Galán (Spain) Juan Lebrón | 7–6 / 6–7 / 7–6 | (Argentina) Franco Stupaczuk (Argentina) Martin Di Nenno | |

Women's

| Date | Winners | Score | Opponent | Refs. |
|---|---|---|---|---|
| 10/12/2023 | (Spain) Bea Gonzalez (Argentina) Delfina Brea | 6–0 / 7–6 | (Spain) Alejandra Salazar (Portugal) Sofia Araújo | |

== Points distribution ==
Below is a series of tables showing the ranking points and money a player can earn.

| Event | First round | Second Round | Round of 16 | QF | SF | F | W |
| Points | 18 | 45 | 90 | 180 | 300 | 600 | 1000 |
