= Premier Padel 2023 =

Details
- Duration: 26 February - 10 December
- Edition: 2nd
- Tournaments: 6
- Categories: Major (3); P1 (3)

Achievements (singles)
- Most titles: (Argentina) Agustín Tapia (Spain) Arturo Coello
- Most finals: (Argentina) Agustín Tapia (Spain) Arturo Coello

The Premier Padel 2023 season was the 2nd edition of the Premier Padel circuit, promoted by the International Padel Federation, and with the financial backing of Nasser Al-Khelaïfi.

This edition was held throughout 2023 and consisted of eight tournaments, played across 7 countries and 4 continents, but only six were actually played. This edition ended with Agustín Tapia and Arturo Coello as the most victorius pair, having won 5 of the 6 tournaments.

== Schedule ==
In its second edition, the Premier Padel calendar remained restricted by the World Padel Tour schedule, as the top ranked players were contractually obligated to play all the Master and Open (1000) tournaments of the circuit.

The official calendar was published on February 3rd, and it featured the same tournaments as the previous edition: four Majors and four P1s. This meant that players would return to iconic venues such as the Stade Roland Garros in France and the Foro Italico in Rome.

Finally, it was announced that this edition of Premier Padel would include a women's division, after having only a men's category in 2022.

| Tournament | City | Country | Date | Ref. |
|---|---|---|---|---|
| Qatar Major | Doha | Qatar | 26 February – 5 March | |
| Italy Major | Roma | Italy | 10 – 16 July | |
| Madrid P1 | Madrid | Spain | 17 – 23 July | |
| Mendoza P1 | Mendoza | Argentina | 31 July – 6 August | |
| Paris Major | París | France | 4 – 10 September | |
| ~~NewGiza P1~~ | ~~Giza~~ | ~~Egypt~~ | ~~30 October – 5 November~~ | |
| ~~Mexico Major~~ | ~~Monterrey~~ | ~~Mexico~~ | ~~27 November – 3 December~~ | |
| Milano P1 | Milan | Italy | 4 – 10 December | |

== Results ==
Major
P1

=== Men's division ===
| Tournament | Winners | Runners-up | Score |
|---|---|---|---|
| Qatar | (Argentina) Franco Stupaczuk (Argentina) Martín Di Nenno | (Argentina) Fernando Belasteguín (Argentina) Sanyo Gutiérrez | 6–2 / 7–6^{(5)} |
| Italy | (Argentina) Agustín Tapia (Spain) Arturo Coello | (Argentina) Federico Chingotto (Spain) Paquito Navarro | 7–5 / 7–6^{(2)} |
| (Spain) Madrid | (Argentina) Agustín Tapia (Spain) Arturo Coello | (Argentina) Federico Chingotto (Spain) Paquito Navarro | 7–5 / 6–2 |
| (Argentina) Mendoza | (Argentina) Agustín Tapia (Spain) Arturo Coello | (Argentina) Franco Stupaczuk (Argentina) Martín Di Nenno | 6–2 / 7–6^{(6)} |
| (France) Paris | (Argentina) Agustín Tapia (Spain) Arturo Coello | (Argentina) Federico Chingotto (Spain) Paquito Navarro | 7–6^{(2)} / 6–1 |
| (Italy) Milan | (Spain) Alejandro Galán (Spain) Juan Lebrón | (Argentina) Franco Stupaczuk (Argentina) Martín Di Nenno | 7–6 / 6–7 / 7–6 |

=== Women's division ===
Major
P1

| Tournament | Winners | Runners-up | Score |
|---|---|---|---|
| Italy | (Spain) Gemma Triay (Spain) Marta Ortega | (Spain) Ariana Sánchez (Spain) Paula Josemaría | 6–3 / 3–6 / 7–5 |
| (Spain) Madrid | (Spain) Bea González (Argentina) Delfi Brea | (Spain) Ariana Sánchez (Spain) Paula Josemaría | 5–7 / 7–6^{(3)} / 7-6^{(6)} |
| (France) Paris | (Spain) Ariana Sánchez (Spain) Paula Josemaría | (Spain) Gemma Triay (Spain) Marta Ortega | 6–2 / 6–4 |
| (Italy) Milan | (Spain) Bea González (Argentina) Delfi Brea | (Spain) Alejandra Salazar (Portugal) Sofia Araujo | 6–0 / 7–6^{(4)} |
