= 2026 Málaga P1 =

Premier Padel tournament held in Málaga

- Date: 11 – 19 July
- Edition: 3rd
- Category: P1
- Prize money: €479.068
- Location: Málaga, Spain
- Venue: Palacio de Deportes José María Martín Carpena
- Court speed: Medium-Fast

Champions
- Men's doubles: (Argentina) Agustín Tapia (Spain) Arturo Coello
- Women's doubles: (Argentina) Delfina Brea (Spain) Gemma Triay

Chronology

The 2026 Málaga P1 (officially 2026 Premier Padel Andalusia Málaga P1) was the thirteenth tournament of the fifth season organized by Premier Padel, the premier padel circuit, promoted by the International Padel Federation, and with the financial backing of Nasser Al-Khelaïfi's Qatar Sports Investments.

In the women's category, after a run of four tournaments, the top two ranked FIP pairs reached the finals. In the title match, Delfina Brea and Gemma Triay defeated Bea Gonzalez and Paula Josemaria in three sets to claim their fourth title of 2026.

In the men's category, Juan Lebrón and Leandro Augsburger, the No. 3 ranked pair, reached their third final of the season, ending a streak of six tournaments that had featured the top two FIP ranked pairs in the title match. In the finals, world No. 1 pair Agustín Tapia and Arturo Coello defeated Augsburger and Lebrón with ease, claiming their seventh title of 2026.

== Tournament ==
Before the tournament began, Ariana Sánchez and Andrea Ustero, the third-ranked pair, announced they would not compete on the Costa del Sol, as Ustero had sustained an injury requiring rest. After suffering a decisive defeat against Alejandro Galán and Federico Chingotto, who were at the peak of their season, Agustín Tapia and Arturo Coello have completely turned the situation around, winning the next five Premier Padel tournaments: the Italy Major, Valencia P1, Valladolid P2, Bordeaux P2, and now the Málaga P1.

== Seeds ==
Male

Rnk.	Team	FIP Ranking Points
1	(Argentina) Agustín Tapia (Spain) Arturo Coello	42960
2	(Spain) Alejandro Galán (Argentina) Federico Chingotto	35440
3	(Spain) Juan Lebrón (Argentina) Leandro Augsburguer	14755
4	(Argentina) Franco Stupaczuk (Spain) Mike Yanguas	13800
5	(Spain) Coki Nieto (Spain) Jon Sanz	10975
6	(Argentina) Martín Di Nenno (Spain) Paquito Navarro	10820
7	(Spain) Francisco Guerrero (Spain) Javi Leal	7713
8	(Brazil) Lucas Campagnolo (Spain) Momo González	7430
9	(Spain) Javier Garrido (Brazil) Lucas Bergamini	6920
10	(Argentina) Juan Tello (Argentina) Maximiliano Arce	5501
11	(Spain) Aimar Goñi (Spain) Eduardo Alonso	4912
12	(Spain) Alejandro Ruiz (Spain) Juanlu Esbri	4890
13	(Spain) Javier Garcia Mora (Spain) Jose Jimenez Casas	4571
14	(Spain) Alejandro Arroyo (Argentina) Leonel Aguirre	4418
15	(Argentina) Gonzalo Alfonso (Spain) Javier Barahona	4408
16	(United Arab Emirates) Inigo Jofre (Spain) Jairo Bautista	4368

Female

Rnk.	Team	FIP Ranking Points
1	(Argentina) Delfina Brea (Spain) Gemma Triay	35520
2	(Spain) Bea González (Spain) Paula Josemaria	28860
3	(Spain) Ariana Sánchez (Spain) Andrea Ustero	22640
4	(Spain) Claudia Fernandéz (Portugal) Sofia Araújo	18600
5	(Argentina) Claudia Jensen (Spain) Tamara Icardo	12885
6	(Spain) Marta Ortega (Spain) Martina Calvo	11365
7	(Spain) Alejandra Alonso (Spain) Marina Guinart	8720
8	(Spain) Alejandra Salazar (Argentina) Aranzazu Osoro	7983
9	(Spain) Jimena Velasco (Spain) Veronica Virseda	6658
10	(Spain) Beatriz Caldera (Spain) Carmen Goenaga	6200
11	(Argentina) Martina Fassio Goyeneche (Spain) Raquel Eugenio Barrera	5321
12	(Spain) Lorena Rufo (Spain) Victoria Iglesias	5248
13	(Italy) Carolina Orsi (Spain) Patricia Llaguno	4895
14	(Italy) Giulia Dal Pozzo (Spain) Nuria Rodriguez	4570
15	(Spain) Lucía Sainz (Spain) Sofia Saiz	4083
16	(Spain) Jessica Castelló (Spain) Marta Talavan	3783

== Head-to-head record between teams ranked in the top 4 during the season ==
=== Men's ===
Record	Coello–Tapia	Galán–Chingotto	Augsburger–Lebrón	Stupaczuk–Yanguas
Coello–Tapia	—	5–4	6–1	5–0
Galán–Chingotto	4–5	—	3–2	3–0
Augsburger–Lebrón	1–6	2–3	—	—
Stupaczuk–Yanguas	0–5	0–3	—	—

=== Women's ===
Record	D. Brea–Triay	B. González–Paula	Ariana–Ustero	Araúijo–C. Fernandez
D. Brea–Triay	—	2–5	4–3	3–0
B. González–Paula	5–2	—	4–3	2–0
Ariana–Ustero	3–4	3–4	—	1–0
Araúijo–C. Fernandez	0–3	0–2	0–1	—

== Draws ==
=== Men's Bracket ===
Round of 32
1	(Spain) Coello / (Argentina) Tapia	6	6
20	(Spain) D.G. Sánchez / (Italy) E. Jensen	3	2
21	(Spain) P.G. Rodrigo / (Spain) P. Lijó	3	3
14	(Spain) A. Arroyo / (Argentina) L. Aguirre	6	6
11	(Spain) A. Goñi / (Spain) E. Alonso	6	6
28	(Spain) L.H. Quesada / (Argentina) L. Capra	4	3
30	(Spain) E. Goenaga / (Spain) M. Castaño	4	3
5	(Spain) Coki / (Spain) J. Sanz	6	6
6	(Argentina) Di Nenno / (Spain) Paquito	6	6
WC	(Spain) J. Zamora / (Spain) P. Vicente	2	2
27	(Spain) A. Rodriguez / (Argentina) J. De Pascual	7	6
16	(United Arab Emirates) I. Jofre / (Spain) J. Bautista	6	3
9	(Spain) J. Garrido / (Brazil) L. Bergamini	4	6	6
Q	(Italy) A. Patiniotis / (Spain) M. Benitez	6	4	2
Q	(Spain) J.S. Marmolejo / (Argentina) R. Pereyra	2	4
4	(Argentina) Stupaczuk / (Spain) Yanguas	6	6
3	(Spain) Lebrón / (Argentina) L. Augsburger	6	6
29	(Spain) D. Santigosa / (Spain) M. Sintes	3	4
18	(Argentina) M. Blasco / (Argentina) Sanyo	7	6
12	(Spain) A. Ruiz / (Spain) J. Esbri	6	4
13	(Spain) J.G. Mora / (Spain) J.J. Casas	6	6
Q	(Belgium) C. Geens / (France) D. Guichard	4	2
Q	(Spain) D. Garcia / (Spain) S. Pineda	4	4
8	(Brazil) L. Campagnolo / (Spain) Momo	6	6
7	(Spain) F. Guerrero / (Spain) J. Leal	7	7
19	(Argentina) A. Chozas / (Argentina) V. Libaak	6	6
22	(Argentina) I. Piotto / (Spain) J.G. Diestro	6	4	7
15	(Argentina) G. Alfonso / (Spain) J. Barahona	3	6	5
10	(Argentina) J. Tello / (Argentina) M. Arce	6	7
32	(United Arab Emirates) I. Vilariño / (Spain) M. Del Castillo	4	6
34	(Italy) D. Perino / (Italy) F. Dominguez	0	3
2	(Argentina) Chingotto / (Spain) Galán	6	6

Round of 16
1	(Spain) Coello / (Argentina) Tapia	6	6
14	(Spain) A. Arroyo / (Argentina) L. Aguirre	4	4
11	(Spain) A. Goñi / (Spain) E. Alonso	6	3	6
5	(Spain) Coki / (Spain) J. Sanz	3	6	3
6	(Argentina) Di Nenno / (Spain) Paquito	6	6
27	(Spain) A. Rodriguez / (Argentina) J. De Pascual	1	4
9	(Spain) J. Garrido / (Brazil) L. Bergamini	2	1
4	(Argentina) Stupaczuk / (Spain) Yanguas	6	1	*
3	(Spain) Lebrón / (Argentina) L. Augsburger	6	6
18	(Argentina) M. Blasco / (Argentina) Sanyo	4	4
13	(Spain) J.G. Mora / (Spain) J.J. Casas	0	0
8	(Brazil) L. Campagnolo / (Spain) Momo	6	6
7	(Spain) F. Guerrero / (Spain) J. Leal	6	6
22	(Argentina) I. Piotto / (Spain) J.G. Diestro	1	2
10	(Argentina) J. Tello / (Argentina) M. Arce	2	3
2	(Argentina) Chingotto / (Spain) Galán	6	6

Quarter-Final
1	(Spain) Coello / (Argentina) Tapia	6	6	6
11	(Spain) A. Goñi / (Spain) E. Alonso	7	1	4
6	(Argentina) Di Nenno / (Spain) Paquito	7	6
4	(Argentina) Stupaczuk / (Spain) Yanguas	5	3
3	(Spain) Lebrón / (Argentina) L. Augsburger	6	6
8	(Brazil) L. Campagnolo / (Spain) Momo	3	2
7	(Spain) F. Guerrero / (Spain) J. Leal	3	6
2	(Argentina) Chingotto / (Spain) Galán	6	7

Semi-Finals
1	(Spain) Coello / (Argentina) Tapia	6	6
6	(Argentina) Di Nenno / (Spain) Paquito	4	3
3	(Spain) Lebrón / (Argentina) L. Augsburger	2	6	7
2	(Argentina) Chingotto / (Spain) Galán	6	3	6

Finals
1	(Spain) Coello / (Argentina) Tapia	6	6
3	(Spain) Lebrón / (Argentina) L. Augsburger	2	2

=== Women's Bracket ===
Round of 32
1	(Argentina) D. Brea / (Spain) G. Triay
Bye
21	(Spain) A. Perez / (Spain) L. Martinez	3	3
12	(Spain) L. Rufo / (Spain) V. Iglesias	6	6
13	(Italy) C. Orsi / (Spain) P. Llaguno	6	6
17	(Spain) M.R Abajo / (Spain) N. Canovas	1	4
15	(Spain) L. Sainz / (Spain) S. Saiz
5	(Argentina) C. Jensen / (Spain) T. Icardo	6	6
6	(Spain) M. Ortega / (Spain) M. Calvo	6	6
18	(Spain) J. Montes / (Spain) M. Barrera	2	3
14	(Italy) G. Dal Pozzo / (Spain) N. Rodriguez	6	4	6
20	(Spain) A. Martinez / (Spain) L. Luján	3	6	0
WC	(Spain) C. Castillon / (Italy) L. Vano	0	2
19	(France) A. Collombon / (Russia) K. Sharifova	6	6
Bye
4	(Spain) C. Fernández / (Portugal) S. Araújo
LL	(Spain) C. Montero / (Spain) P. Fortun
Bye
Q	(Spain) A. Lopez / (Spain) A. Cañellas	6	6
Q	(Italy) C. Baldi / (Spain) M. Borrero	4	1
11	(Argentina) M. Goyeneche / (Spain) R. Barrera	4	6	6
23	(Spain) T. Navarro / (Argentina) V. Riera	6	4	0
9	(Spain) J. Velasco / (Spain) V. Virseda	6	3
7	(Spain) A. Alonso / (Spain) M. Guinart	7	6
8	(Spain) A. Salazar / (Argentina) A. Osoro	4	3
10	(Spain) B. Caldera / (Spain) C. Goenaga	6	6
Q	(Italy) G. Marchetti / (Spain) L. Arruabarrena	6	7
22	(Argentina) J. Bidahorria / (Spain) M. Caparros	3	5
16	(Spain) J. Castelló / (Spain) M. Talavan	6	7
Q	(Spain) C. Goyeneche / (Spain) M. Merino	2	6
Bye
2	(Spain) B. González / (Spain) P. Josemaria

Round of 16
1	(Argentina) D. Brea / (Spain) G. Triay	6	6
12	(Spain) L. Rufo / (Spain) V. Iglesias	2	3
13	(Italy) C. Orsi / (Spain) P. Llaguno	2	3
5	(Argentina) C. Jensen / (Spain) T. Icardo	6	6
6	(Spain) M. Ortega / (Spain) M. Calvo	6	5	*
14	(Italy) G. Dal Pozzo / (Spain) N. Rodriguez	2	1
19	(France) A. Collombon / (Russia) K. Sharifova	2	0
4	(Spain) C. Fernández / (Portugal) S. Araújo	6	6
LL	(Spain) C. Montero / (Spain) P. Fortun	6	3	1
Q	(Spain) A. Lopez / (Spain) A. Cañellas	3	6	6
11	(Argentina) M. Goyeneche / (Spain) R. Barrera	0	3
7	(Spain) A. Alonso / (Spain) M. Guinart	6	6
10	(Spain) B. Caldera / (Spain) C. Goenaga	7	6
Q	(Italy) G. Marchetti / (Spain) L. Arruabarrena	6	3
16	(Spain) J. Castelló / (Spain) M. Talavan	3	4
2	(Spain) B. González / (Spain) P. Josemaria	6	6

Quarter-Final
1	(Argentina) D. Brea / (Spain) G. Triay	6	6
5	(Argentina) C. Jensen / (Spain) T. Icardo	2	4
6	(Spain) M. Ortega / (Spain) M. Calvo	3	6	7
4	(Spain) C. Fernández / (Portugal) S. Araújo	6	4	6
Q	(Spain) A. Lopez / (Spain) A. Cañellas	6	3
7	(Spain) A. Alonso / (Spain) M. Guinart	7	6
10	(Spain) B. Caldera / (Spain) C. Goenaga	1	3
2	(Spain) B. González / (Spain) P. Josemaria	6	6

Semi-Finals
1	(Argentina) D. Brea / (Spain) G. Triay	6	6
6	(Spain) M. Ortega / (Spain) M. Calvo	0	4
7	(Spain) A. Alonso / (Spain) M. Guinart	2	2
2	(Spain) B. González / (Spain) P. Josemaria	6	6

Finals
1	(Argentina) D. Brea / (Spain) G. Triay	7	3	7
2	(Spain) B. González / (Spain) P. Josemaria	5	6	6

== Results ==
=== First Round ===
Men's

Date	Winners	Score	Opponent	Refs.
13/7/2026	(Spain) David Gala Sánchez (Italy) Enzo Jensen	6–3 / 6–4	(Spain) Mario Ortega (Spain) Victor Ruiz	
13/7/2026	(Spain) Pablo Garcia Rodrigo (Spain) Pablo Lijó	7–6 / 7–6	(Spain) Francisco Cabeza (Paraguay) Mariano Gonzalez San Martin	
13/7/2026	(Argentina) Luciano Capra (Spain) Luis Hernandez Quesada'	6–4 / 6–7 / 7–6	(Argentina) Federico Mourino (Spain) Marc Quilez	
13/7/2026	(Spain) Enrique Goenaga (Spain) Manuel Castaño	6–2 / 6–4	(Spain) Álvaro Cepero (Argentina) Eduardo Agustín Torre	
13/7/2026	(Spain) Juan Zamora (Spain) Pablo Sánchez Vicente	7–6 / 6–4	(Spain) Guillermo Collado (Spain) Pol Hernandez	
13/7/2026	(Spain) Alonso Rodriguez Martinez (Argentina) Juan De Pascual	6–3 / 6–2	(United Arab Emirates) Arnau Ayats (France) Thomas Leygue	
13/7/2026	(Italy) Aris Patiniotis (Spain) Miguel Benitez	6–1 / 5–7 / 6–2	(Spain) Ignacio Sager (Argentina) Juan Cruz Belluati	
13/7/2026	(Spain) Jose Solano Marmolejo (Argentina) Ramiro Pereyra	7–6 / 6–4	(Spain) Andres Fernandez Lancha (Spain) Gonzalo Rubio	
13/7/2026	(Spain) Daniel Santigosa (Spain) Marc Sintes	6–4 / 6–2	(Spain) Javier Martinez (Argentina) Ramiro Jesus Valenzuela	
13/7/2026	(Argentina) Maximiliano Sánchez Blasco (Argentina) Sanyo Gutiérrez	2–6 / 6–4 / 6–2	(Argentina) Ignacio Archieri (Spain) Victor Mena	
13/7/2026	(Belgium) Clement Geens (France) Dylan Guichard	6–4 / 7–6	(Spain) Albert Roglan Pons (Spain) Manuel Aragon Herrera	
13/7/2026	(Spain) Diego Garcia Garcia (Spain) Santiago Pineda Cabello	7–5 / 6–2	(Spain) Francisco Manuel Gil (Spain) Javier Ruiz	
13/7/2026	(Argentina) Alex Chozas (Argentina) Valentino Libaak	6–2 / 3–6 / 6–0	(Spain) Marcos Gonzalez Blanco (Paraguay) Martin Abud	
13/7/2026	(Argentina) Ignacio Piotto (Spain) Jose Garcia Diestro	6–3 / 6–4	(Portugal) Miguel Deus (Portugal) Nuno Deus	
13/7/2026	(United Arab Emirates) Ignacio Vilariño (Spain) Mario Del Castillo	6–3 / 7–5	(Italy) Alvaro Montiel Caruso (Italy) Flavio Abbate	
13/7/2026	(Italy) Denis Perino (Italy) Facundo Dominguez	6–0 / 7–5	(Argentina) Juan Ignacio Rubini (Argentina) Maxi Sánchez	

=== Round of 32 ===
Men's

Date	Winners	Score	Opponent	Refs.
15/7/2026	(Argentina) Agustín Tapia (Spain) Arturo Coello	6–3 / 6–2	(Spain) David Gala Sánchez (Italy) Enzo Jensen	
15/7/2026	(Spain) Alejandro Arroyo (Argentina) Leonel Aguirre	6–3 / 6–3	(Spain) Pablo Garcia Rodrigo (Spain) Pablo Lijó	
15/7/2026	(Spain) Aimar Goñi (Spain) Eduardo Alonso	6–4 / 6–3	(Argentina) Luciano Capra (Spain) Luis Hernandez Quesada	
14/7/2026	(Spain) Coki Nieto (Spain) Jon Sanz	6–4 / 6–3	(Spain) Enrique Goenaga (Spain) Manuel Castaño	
15/7/2026	(Argentina) Martin Di Nenno (Spain) Paquito Navarro	6–2 / 6–2	(Spain) Juan Zamora (Spain) Pablo Sánchez Vicente	
14/7/2026	(Spain) Alonso Rodriguez Martinez (Argentina) Juan De Pascual	7–6 / 6–3	(United Arab Emirates) Inigo Jofre (Spain) Jairo Bautista	
14/7/2026	(Spain) Javier Garrido (Brazil) Lucas Bergamini	4–6 / 6–4 / 6–2	(Italy) Aris Patiniotis (Spain) Miguel Benitez	
15/7/2026	(Argentina) Franco Stupaczuk (Spain) Mike Yanguas	6–2 / 6–4	(Spain) Jose Solano Marmolejo (Argentina) Ramiro Pereyra	
15/7/2026	(Spain) Juan Lebrón (Argentina) Leandro Augsburger	6–3 / 6–4	(Spain) Daniel Santigosa (Spain) Marc Sintes	
14/7/2026	(Argentina) Maximiliano Sánchez Blasco (Argentina) Sanyo Gutiérrez	7–6 / 6–4	(Spain) Aléx Ruiz (Spain) Juanlu Esbri	
14/7/2026	(Spain) Javier Garcia Mora (Spain) Jose Jimenez Casas	6–4 / 6–2	(Belgium) Clement Geens (France) Dylan Guichard	
14/7/2026	(Brazil) Lucas Campagnolo (Spain) Momo González	6–4 / 6–4	(Spain) Diego Garcia Garcia (Spain) Santiago Pineda Cabello	
14/7/2026	(Spain) Francisco Guerrero (Spain) Javi Leal	7–6 / 7–6	(Argentina) Alex Chozas (Argentina) Valentino Libaak	
15/7/2026	(Argentina) Ignacio Piotto (Spain) Jose Garcia Diestro	6–3 / 4–6 / 7–5	(Argentina) Gonzalo Alfonso (Spain) Javier Barahona	
14/7/2026	(Argentina) Juan Tello (Argentina) Maximiliano Arce	6–4 / 7–6	(United Arab Emirates) Ignacio Vilariño (Spain) Mario Del Castillo	
15/7/2026	(Spain) Alejandro Galán (Argentina) Federico Chingotto	6–0 / 6–3	(Italy) Denis Perino (Italy) Facundo Dominguez	

Women's

Date	Winners	Score	Opponent	Refs.
15/7/2026	(Spain) Lorena Rufo (Spain) Victoria Iglesias	6–3 / 6–3	(Spain) Agueda Perez (Spain) Lucia Martinez	
14/7/2026	(Italy) Carolina Orsi (Spain) Patricia Llaguno	6–1 / 6–4	(Spain) Maria Rodriguez Abajo (Spain) Noa Canovas	
15/7/2026	(Argentina) Claudia Jensen (Spain) Tamara Icardo	6–2 / 6–3	(Spain) Lucía Sainz (Spain) Sofia Saiz	
15/7/2026	(Spain) Marta Ortega (Spain) Martina Calvo	6–2 / 6–3	(Spain) Jana Montes (Spain) Marta Barrera	
15/7/2026	(Italy) Giulia Dal Pozzo (Spain) Nuria Rodriguez	6–3 / 4–6 / 6–0	(Spain) Araceli Martinez (Spain) Laura Luján	
14/7/2026	(France) Alix Collombon (Russia) Ksenia Sharifova	6–0 / 6–2	(Spain) Carmen Castillon (Italy) Lorena Vano	
14/7/2026	(Spain) Amanda Lopez (Spain) Ariadna Cañellas	6–4 / 6–1	(Italy) Caterina Baldi (Spain) Marta Borrero	
14/7/2026	(Argentina) Martina Fassio Goyeneche (Spain) Raquel Eugenio Barrera	4–6 / 6–4 / 6–0	(Spain) Teresa Navarro (Argentina) Virginia Riera	
14/7/2026	(Spain) Alejandra Alonso (Spain) Marina Guinart	7–6 / 6–3	(Spain) Jimena Velasco (Spain) Veronica Virseda	
15/7/2026	(Spain) Beatriz Caldera (Spain) Carmen Goenaga	6–4 / 6–3	(Spain) Alejandra Salazar (Argentina) Aranzazu Osoro	
14/7/2026	(Italy) Giorgia Marchetti (Spain) Lara Arruabarrena	6–3 / 7–5	(Argentina) Julieta Bidahorria (Spain) Marta Caparros	
15/7/2026	(Spain) Jessica Castelló (Spain) Marta Talavan	6–2 / 7–6	(Spain) Camila Fassio Goyeneche (Spain) Melania Merino	

=== Round of 16 ===
Men's

Date	Winners	Score	Opponent	Refs.
16/7/2026	(Argentina) Agustín Tapia (Spain) Arturo Coello	6–4 / 6–4	(Spain) Alejandro Arroyo (Argentina) Leonel Aguirre	
16/7/2026	(Spain) Aimar Goñi (Spain) Eduardo Alonso	6–3 / 3–6 / 6–3	(Spain) Coki Nieto (Spain) Jon Sanz	
16/7/2026	(Argentina) Martin Di Nenno (Spain) Paquito Navarro	6–1 / 6–4	(Spain) Alonso Rodriguez Martinez (Argentina) Juan De Pascual	
16/7/2026	(Argentina) Franco Stupaczuk (Spain) Mike Yanguas	6–2 / 1–1 / W.O.	(Spain) Javier Garrido (Brazil) Lucas Bergamini	
16/7/2026	(Spain) Juan Lebrón (Argentina) Leandro Augsburger	6–4 / 6–4	(Argentina) Maximiliano Sánchez Blasco (Argentina) Sanyo Gutiérrez	
16/7/2026	(Brazil) Lucas Campagnolo (Spain) Momo González	6–0 / 6–0	(Spain) Javier Garcia Mora (Spain) Jose Jimenez Casas	
16/7/2026	(Spain) Francisco Guerrero (Spain) Javi Leal	6–1 / 6–2	(Argentina) Ignacio Piotto (Spain) Jose Garcia Diestro	
16/7/2026	(Spain) Alejandro Galán (Argentina) Federico Chingotto	6–2 / 6–3	(Argentina) Juan Tello (Argentina) Maximiliano Arce	

Women's

Date	Winners	Score	Opponent	Refs.
16/7/2026	(Argentina) Delfina Brea (Spain) Gemma Triay	6–2 / 6–3	(Spain) Lorena Rufo (Spain) Victoria Iglesias	
16/7/2026	(Argentina) Claudia Jensen (Spain) Tamara Icardo	6–2 / 6–3	(Italy) Carolina Orsi (Spain) Patricia Llaguno	
16/7/2026	(Spain) Marta Ortega (Spain) Martina Calvo	6–2 / 5–1 / W.O.	(Italy) Giulia Dal Pozzo (Spain) Nuria Rodriguez	
16/7/2026	(Spain) Claudia Fernández (Portugal) Sofia Araújo	6–2 / 6–0	(France) Alix Collombon (Russia) Ksenia Sharifova	
16/7/2026	(Spain) Amanda Lopez (Spain) Ariadna Cañellas	3–6 / 6–3 / 6–1	(Spain) Claudia Escacena (Spain) Patricia Fortun	
16/7/2026	(Spain) Alejandra Alonso (Spain) Marina Guinart	6–0 / 6–3	(Argentina) Martina Fassio Goyeneche (Spain) Raquel Eugenio Barrera	
16/7/2026	(Spain) Beatriz Caldera (Spain) Carmen Goenaga	7–6 / 6–3	(Italy) Giorgia Marchetti (Spain) Lara Arruabarrena	
16/7/2026	(Spain) Bea González (Spain) Paula Josemaría	6–3 / 6–4	(Spain) Jessica Castelló (Spain) Marta Talavan	

=== Quarter-Finals ===
Men's

Date	Winners	Score	Opponent	Refs.
17/7/2026	(Argentina) Agustín Tapia (Spain) Arturo Coello	6–7 / 6–1 / 6–4	(Spain) Aimar Goñi (Spain) Eduardo Alonso	
17/7/2026	(Argentina) Martin Di Nenno (Spain) Paquito Navarro	7–5 / 6–3	(Argentina) Franco Stupaczuk (Spain) Mike Yanguas	
17/7/2026	(Spain) Juan Lebrón (Argentina) Leandro Augsburger	6–3 / 6–2	(Brazil) Lucas Campagnolo (Spain) Momo González	
17/7/2026	(Spain) Alejandro Galán (Argentina) Federico Chingotto	6–3 / 76	(Spain) Francisco Guerrero (Spain) Javi Leal	

Women's

Date	Winners	Score	Opponent	Refs.
17/7/2026	(Argentina) Delfina Brea (Spain) Gemma Triay	6–2 / 6–4	(Argentina) Claudia Jensen (Spain) Tamara Icardo	
17/7/2026	(Spain) Marta Ortega (Spain) Martina Calvo	3–6 / 6–4 / 7–6	(Spain) Claudia Fernández (Portugal) Sofia Araújo	
17/7/2026	(Spain) Alejandra Alonso (Spain) Marina Guinart	7–6 / 6–3	(Spain) Amanda Lopez (Spain) Ariadna Cañellas	
17/7/2026	(Spain) Bea González (Spain) Paula Josemaría	6–1 / 6–3	(Spain) Beatriz Caldera (Spain) Carmen Goenaga	

=== Semi-Finals ===
Men's

Date	Winners	Score	Opponent	Refs.
18/7/2026	(Argentina) Agustín Tapia (Spain) Arturo Coello	6–4 / 6–3	(Argentina) Martin Di Nenno (Spain) Paquito Navarro	
18/7/2026	(Spain) Juan Lebrón (Argentina) Leandro Augsburger	2–6 / 6–3 / 7–6	(Spain) Alejandro Galán (Argentina) Federico Chingotto	

Women's

Date	Winners	Score	Opponent	Refs.
18/7/2026	(Argentina) Delfina Brea (Spain) Gemma Triay	6–0 / 6–4	(Spain) Marta Ortega (Spain) Martina Calvo	
18/7/2026	(Spain) Bea González (Spain) Paula Josemaría	6–2 / 6–2	(Spain) Alejandra Alonso (Spain) Marina Guinart	

=== Finals ===
Men's

Date	Winners	Score	Opponent	Refs.
19/7/2026	(Argentina) Agustín Tapia (Spain) Arturo Coello	6–2 / 6–2	(Spain) Juan Lebrón (Argentina) Leandro Augsburger	

Women's

Date	Winners	Score	Opponent	Refs.
19/7/2026	(Argentina) Delfina Brea (Spain) Gemma Triay	7–5 / 3–6 / 7–6	(Spain) Bea González (Spain) Paula Josemaría	
