= 2026 Italy Major =

Premier Padel tournament held in Rome

- Date: 31 May – 7 June
- Edition: 5th
- Category: Major
- Prize money: €1.044.849
- Location: Rome, Italy
- Venue: Foro Italico
- Court speed: Fast

Champions
- Men's doubles: (Argentina) Agustín Tapia (Spain) Arturo Coello
- Women's doubles: (Argentina) Delfina Brea (Spain) Gemma Triay

Chronology

The 2026 Italy Major (officially 2026 Premier Padel BNL Italy Major) was the ninth tournament of the fifth season organized by Premier Padel, the premier padel circuit, promoted by the International Padel Federation, and with the financial backing of Nasser Al-Khelaïfi's Qatar Sports Investments.

In the women's category, the number 3 FIP ranked pair ended a six-tournament streak of failing to reach the finals, thereby ending a run of six tournaments where the top two ranked pairs had faced each other in the title match. In the finals, Delfina Brea and Gemma Triay defeated Ariana Sánchez and Andrea Ustero, claiming their third title of 2026.

In the men's category, the two top-ranked pairs on the FIP circuit reached the final for the third consecutive tournament, marking the sixth time this season. In the title match, Agustín Tapia and Arturo Coello, playing in their twentieth consecutive final (across tournaments they entered), defeated Alejandro Galán and Federico Chingotto in straight sets, securing their third title of 2026.

== Relevant Data ==
=== Di Nenno and Paquito together again ===
Before the tournament, Martín Di Nenno and Paquito Navarro, who had contended for the world number one spot right up until the final tournament of 2021, announced that they would join forces once more for a second stint as a pair.

=== Historic semi-final ===
With their quarterfinal victory over Claudia Fernández and Sofia Araújo, Giulia Dal Pozzo and Nuria Rodríguez qualified for their first semifinal as a pair. With this achievement, Giulia became the first Italian athlete to reach a semifinal on the premier padel tour.

=== The longest match in history ===
The semifinal between Ariana Sánchez and Andrea Ustero and the pair of Bea González and Paula Josemaria set the record for the longest padel match ever played, lasting 4 hours and 12 minutes. The defeat also marked the end of Bea and Paula's 22-match winning streak.

== Seeds ==
Male

Rnk.	Team	FIP Ranking Points
1	(Argentina) Agustín Tapia (Spain) Arturo Coello	42218
2	(Spain) Alejandro Galán (Argentina) Federico Chingotto	36714
3	(Argentina) Franco Stupaczuk (Spain) Mike Yanguas	13894
4	(Spain) Juan Lebrón (Argentina) Leandro Augsburger	13797
5	(Spain) Coki Nieto (Spain) Jon Sanz	11296
6	(Argentina) Martín Di Nenno (Spain) Paquito Navarro	11291
7	(Spain) Francisco Guerrero (Spain) Javi Leal	8881
8	(Brazil) Lucas Bergamini (Spain) Javi Garrido	7266
9	(Brazil) Lucas Campagnolo (Spain) Momo González	6851
10	(Spain) Aimar Goñi (Spain) Eduardo Alonso	4922
11	(Spain) Alejandro Ruiz (Spain) Juanlu Esbri	4914
12	(Spain) Alejandro Arroyo (Argentina) Leonel Aguirre	4664
13	(Spain) Javier Garcia Mora (Spain) Jose Jimenez Casas	4564
14	(United Arab Emirates) Inigo Jofre (Spain) Jairo Bautista	4543
15	(Argentina) Juan Tello (Spain) Maximiliano Arce	4466
16	(Argentina) Gonzalo Alfonso (Spain) Javier Barahona	4359

Female

Rnk.	Team	FIP Ranking Points
1	(Argentina) Delfina Brea (Spain) Gemma Triay	36018
2	(Spain) Bea González (Spain) Paula Josemaria	30751
3	(Spain) Ariana Sánchez (Spain) Andrea Ustero	21531
4	(Spain) Claudia Fernandéz (Portugal) Sofia Araújo	19461
5	(Argentina) Claudia Jensen (Spain) Tamara Icardo	12109
6	(Spain) Marta Ortega (Spain) Martina Calvo	11176
7	(Spain) Alejandra Alonso (Spain) Alejandra Salazar	10058
8	(Spain) Marina Guinart (Spain) Veronica Virseda	8288
9	(Spain) Beatriz Caldera (Spain) Carmen Goenaga	7404
10	(Argentina) Aranzazu Osoro (Spain) Victoria Iglesias	7031
11	(Argentina) Martina Fassio Goyeneche (Spain) Raquel Eugenio Barrera	5154
12	(Italy) Carolina Orsi (Spain) Patricia Llaguno	4856
13	(Spain) Jessica Castelló (Spain) Lorena Rufo	4664
14	(Spain) Jimena Velasco (Spain) Marta Barrera	4156
15	(Spain) Lucía Sainz (Spain) Jana Montes Cabruja	4154
16	(France) Alix Collombon (Russia) Ksenia Sharifova	3518

== Head-to-head record between teams ranked in the top 4 during the season ==
=== Men's ===
Record	Coello–Tapia	Galán–Chingotto	Stupaczuk–Yanguas	Augsburger–Lebrón
Coello–Tapia	—	2–4	4–0	4–1
Galán–Chingotto	4–2	—	2–0	2–1
Stupaczuk–Yanguas	0–4	0–2	—	—
Augsburger–Lebrón	1–4	1–2	—	—

=== Women's ===
Record	D. Brea–Triay	B. González–Paula	Ariana–Ustero	Araúijo–C. Fernandez
D. Brea–Triay	—	1–5	3–1	3–0
B. González–Paula	5–1	—	3–3	2–0
Ariana–Ustero	1–3	3–3	—	—
Araúijo–C. Fernandez	0–3	0–2	—	—

== Draws ==
=== Men's Bracket ===
Round of 32
1	(Spain) Coello / (Argentina) Tapia	6	6
36	(Italy) A. Montiel / (Italy) F. Abbate	2	2
23	(Spain) D.G. Sánchez / (Italy) E. Jensen	6	7
13	(Spain) J.G. Mora / (Spain) J.J. Casas	0	6
11	(Spain) A. Ruiz / (Spain) J. Esbri	6	7
Q	(Spain) F. Cabeza / (Paraguay) M. San Martin	3	6
34	(Spain) D. Santigosa / (Spain) M. Sintes	3	5
8	(Spain) J. Garrido / (Brazil) L. Bergamini	6	7
6	(Argentina) Di Nenno / (Spain) Paquito	6	6
31	(Spain) A. Martinez / (Argentina) J. De Pascual	3	1
40	(Argentina) L. Capra / (Spain) P. Fernandez	3	4
10	(Spain) A. Goñi / (Spain) E. Alonso	6	6
9	(Brazil) L. Campagnolo / (Spain) Momo	6	6
24	(Spain) M. Ortega / (Spain) V. Ruiz	3	3
32	(Spain) F. Gil (Spain) M. Castaño	7	6	3
3	(Argentina) Stupaczuk / (Spain) Yanguas	5	7	6
4	(Spain) Lebrón / (Argentina) L. Augsburger	6	6
Q	(Spain) A. Pons / (Spain) M. Aragon	3	4
33	(United Arab Emirates) I. Vilariño / (Spain) M. Del Castillo	2	4
12	(Spain) A. Arroyo / (Argentina) L. Aguirre	6	6
15	(Argentina) J. Tello / (Argentina) M. Arce	6	6
26	(Spain) A. Cepero / (Argentina) E. Torre	1	4
25	(Spain) J. Martinez / (Spain) L.H. Quesada	1	6	5
5	(Spain) Coki / (Spain) J. Sanz	6	4	7
7	(Spain) F. Guerrero / (Spain) J. Leal	6	4
19	(Spain) G. Collado / (Spain) P.H. Alvarez	7	6
41	(Spain) Á. Amaya / (Spain) J.L. Gonzalez	2	4
14	(United Arab Emirates) I. Jofre / (Spain) J. Bautista	6	6
16	(Argentina) G. Alfonso / (Spain) J. Barahona	6	6
37	(Italy) F. Dominguez / (Spain) T. Zapata	4	3
18	(Argentina) A. Chozas / (Argentina) V. Libaak	1	4
2	(Argentina) Chingotto / (Spain) Galán	6	6

Round of 16
1	(Spain) Coello / (Argentina) Tapia	6	6
23	(Spain) D.G. Sánchez / (Italy) E. Jensen	1	1
11	(Spain) A. Ruiz / (Spain) J. Esbri	1	3
8	(Spain) J. Garrido / (Brazil) L. Bergamini	6	6
6	(Argentina) Di Nenno / (Spain) Paquito	6	6
10	(Spain) A. Goñi / (Spain) E. Alonso	2	4
9	(Brazil) L. Campagnolo / (Spain) Momo	6	7
3	(Argentina) Stupaczuk / (Spain) Yanguas	4	6
4	(Spain) Lebrón / (Argentina) L. Augsburger	7	6
12	(Spain) A. Arroyo / (Argentina) L. Aguirre	6	2
15	(Argentina) J. Tello / (Argentina) M. Arce	2	4
5	(Spain) Coki / (Spain) J. Sanz	6	6
19	(Spain) G. Collado / (Spain) P.H. Alvarez	7	3	6
14	(United Arab Emirates) I. Jofre / (Spain) J. Bautista	6	6	2
16	(Argentina) G. Alfonso / (Spain) J. Barahona	3	6	4
2	(Argentina) Chingotto / (Spain) Galán	6	4	6

Quarter-Final
1	(Spain) Coello / (Argentina) Tapia	6	7
8	(Spain) J. Garrido / (Brazil) L. Bergamini	3	6
6	(Argentina) Di Nenno / (Spain) Paquito	3	3
3	(Argentina) Stupaczuk / (Spain) Yanguas	6	6
4	(Spain) Lebrón / (Argentina) L. Augsburger	6	7
5	(Spain) Coki / (Spain) J. Sanz	4	6
19	(Spain) G. Collado / (Spain) P.H. Alvarez	3	1
2	(Argentina) Chingotto / (Spain) Galán	6	6

Semi-Finals
1	(Spain) Coello / (Argentina) Tapia	6	6
3	(Argentina) Stupaczuk / (Spain) Yanguas	1	4
4	(Spain) Lebrón / (Argentina) L. Augsburger	6	3
2	(Argentina) Chingotto / (Spain) Galán	7	6

Finals
1	(Spain) Coello / (Argentina) Tapia	7	7
2	(Argentina) Chingotto / (Spain) Galán	5	6

=== Women's Bracket ===
Round of 32
1	(Argentina) D. Brea / (Spain) G. Triay
Bye
31	(Spain) C. Montero / (Spain) P. Martinez	6	2	6
13	(Spain) J. Castelló / (Spain) L. Rufo	3	6	3
16	(France) A. Collombon / (Russia) K. Sharifova	6	6
Q	(Spain) L. Exposito / (Argentina) M. Ferreyra	3	2
22	(Spain) M. Talavan / (Spain) S. Saiz	2	2
5	(Argentina) C. Jensen / (Spain) T. Icardo	6	6
7	(Spain) A. Salazar / (Spain) A. Alonso	3	7	2
23	(Italy) G. Dal Pozzo / (Spain) N. Rodriguez	6	5	6
34	(Spain) A. Martinez / (Spain) C. Goyeneche	3	1
12	(Italy) C. Orsi / (Spain) P. Llaguno	6	6
9	(Spain) B. Caldera / (Spain) C. Goenaga	6	6
Q	(Argentina) D. Valenzuela / (Brazil) R. Piltcher	3	3
Bye
4	(Spain) C. Fernández / (Portugal) S. Araújo
3	(Spain) A. Ustero / (Spain) A. Sánchez
Bye
20	(Spain) T. Navarro / (Argentina) V. Riera	2	1
10	(Argentina) A. Osoro / (Spain) V. Iglesias	6	6
14	(Spain) J. Velasco / (Spain) M. Barrera	4	7	7
27	(Spain) J. Bautista / (Spain) M. Lobo	6	6	6
19	(Spain) M.R. Abajo / (Spain) N. Canovas	7	7
8	(Spain) M. Guinart / (Spain) V. Virseda	5	6
6	(Spain) M. Ortega / (Spain) M. Calvo	7	6
18	(Spain) A. Perez / (Spain) L. Martinez	6	4
Q	(Spain) C. Castillon / (Spain) M. Portillo	5	3
15	(Spain) J. Montes / (Spain) L. Sainz	7	6
11	(Argentina) M. Goyeneche / (Spain) R. Barrera	6	6
21	(Spain) A. Martinez / (Spain) L. Luján	1	2
Bye
2	(Spain) B. González / (Spain) P. Josemaria

Round of 16
1	(Argentina) D. Brea / (Spain) G. Triay	6	6
31	(Spain) C. Montero / (Spain) P. Martinez	1	1
16	(France) A. Collombon / (Russia) K. Sharifova	1	0
5	(Argentina) C. Jensen / (Spain) T. Icardo	6	6
23	(Italy) G. Dal Pozzo / (Spain) N. Rodriguez	6	0	7
12	(Spain) B. Caldera / (Spain) C. Goenaga	4	6	6
9	(Spain) B. Caldera / (Spain) C. Goenaga	2	2
4	(Spain) C. Fernández / (Portugal) S. Araújo	6	6
3	(Spain) A. Ustero / (Spain) A. Sánchez	6	6
10	(Argentina) A. Osoro / (Spain) V. Iglesias	4	3
14	(Spain) J. Velasco / (Spain) M. Barrera	6	1	6
19	(Spain) M.R. Abajo / (Spain) N. Canovas	4	6	1
6	(Spain) M. Ortega / (Spain) M. Calvo	6	6
15	(Spain) J. Montes / (Spain) L. Sainz	1	2
11	(Argentina) M. Goyeneche / (Spain) R. Barrera	0	4
2	(Spain) B. González / (Spain) P. Josemaria	6	6

Quarter-Final
1	(Argentina) D. Brea / (Spain) G. Triay	3	6	6
5	(Argentina) C. Jensen / (Spain) T. Icardo	6	4	3
23	(Italy) G. Dal Pozzo / (Spain) N. Rodriguez	3	6	6
4	(Spain) C. Fernández / (Portugal) S. Araújo	6	3	2
3	(Spain) A. Ustero / (Spain) A. Sánchez	6	6
14	(Spain) J. Velasco / (Spain) M. Barrera	1	2
6	(Spain) M. Ortega / (Spain) M. Calvo	2	6	3
2	(Spain) B. González / (Spain) P. Josemaria	6	2	6

Semi-Finals
1	(Argentina) D. Brea / (Spain) G. Triay	6	6
23	(Italy) G. Dal Pozzo / (Spain) N. Rodriguez	3	3
3	(Spain) A. Ustero / (Spain) A. Sánchez	5	7	7
2	(Spain) B. González / (Spain) P. Josemaria	7	6	6

Finals
1	(Argentina) D. Brea / (Spain) G. Triay	6	7
3	(Spain) A. Ustero / (Spain) A. Sánchez	1	5

== Results ==
=== First Round ===
Men's

Date	Winners	Score	Opponent	Refs.
2/6/2026	(Italy) Alvaro Montiel Caruso (Italy) Flavio Abbate	3–6 / 6–4 / 7–5	(Spain) Alberto Garcia Trabanco (Spain) Emilio Sanchez Chamero	
2/6/2026	(Spain) David Gala Sánchez (Italy) Enzo Jensen	2–6 / 6–3 / 6–4	(Argentina) Juan Rubini (Argentina) Maxi Sánchez	
2/6/2026	(Spain) Francisco Cabeza (Paraguay) Mariano San Martin	6–4 / 2–6 / 7–5	(Spain) Andres Fernandez Lancha (Spain) Enrique Goenaga	
2/6/2026	(Spain) Daniel Santigosa (Spain) Marc Sintes	6–1 / 6–4	(Spain) Diego Garcia Garcia (Spain) Santiago Pineda Cabello	
2/6/2026	(Spain) Alonso Rodriguez Martinez (Argentina) Juan De Pascual	6–3 / 4–0 / W.O.	(Spain) Gonzalo Rubio (Spain) Javier Ruiz	
2/6/2026	(Argentina) Luciano Capra (Spain) Pincho Fernandez	6–3 / 7–6	(Spain) Ignacio Sager (Argentina) Juan Cruz Belluati	
2/6/2026	(Spain) Mario Ortega (Spain) Victor Ruiz	6–4 / 6–7 / 6–3	(Spain) Mario Huete Hernandez (Spain) Miguel Benitez	
2/6/2026	(Spain) Francisco Gil Morales (Spain) Manuel Castaño	5–7 / 6–2 / 6–4	(Italy) Giulio Graziotti (Italy) Simone Iacovino	
2/6/2026	(Spain) Albert Roglan Pons (Spain) Manuel Aragon Herrera	7–6 / 6–3	(Argentina) Maximiliano Sánchez Blasco (Argentina) Sanyo Gutiérrez	
2/6/2026	(United Arab Emirates) Ignacio Vilariño (Spain) Mario Del Castillo	6–3 / 3–6 / 6–3	(France) Dylan Guichard (Italy) Marco Cassetta	
2/6/2026	(Spain) Álvaro Cepero (Argentina) Eduardo Agustín Torre	6–3 / 6–0	(Italy) Michele Brambilla (Italy) Noa Bonnefoy	
2/6/2026	(Spain) Javier Martinez (Spain) Luis Hernandez Quesada	7–5 / 6–3	(Argentina) Ignacio Piotto (Spain) Jose Garcia Diestro	
2/6/2026	(Spain) Guillermo Collado (Spain) Pol Hernandez	3–6 / 6–4 / 6–2	(Spain) Pablo Garcia Rodrigo (Spain) Pablo Lijó	
2/6/2026	(Spain) Álvaro Mélendez Amaya (Spain) Jose Luis Gonzalez	6–4 / 6–4	(Portugal) Miguel Deus (Portugal) Nuno Deus	
2/6/2026	(Italy) Facundo Dominguez (Spain) Teodoro Zapata	6–1 / 7–6	(United Arab Emirates) Arnau Ayats (Italy) Denis Perino	
2/6/2026	(Argentina) Alex Chozas (Argentina) Valentino Libaak	6–4 / 6–4	(Argentina) Federico Mourino (Spain) Marc Quilez	

Women's

Date	Winners	Score	Opponent	Refs.
2/6/2026	(Spain) Claudia Escacena (Spain) Patricia Martinez	7–6 / 6–4	(Spain) Ariadna Cañellas (France) Lea Godallier	
2/6/2026	(Spain) Lucia Peralta (Argentina) Maria Ferreyra	4–6 / 6–1 / 6–3	(Spain) Ana Sánchez Perez (Netherlands) Marcella Koek	
2/6/2026	(Spain) Marta Talavan (Spain) Sofía Saiz Vallejo	6–4 / 6–2	(Italy) Giorgia Marchetti (Spain) Marta Borrero	
2/6/2026	(Italy) Giulia Dal Pozzo (Spain) Nuria Rodriguez	6–2 / 6–2	(Spain) Melania Merino (Spain) Sandra Bellver	
2/6/2026	(Spain) Aida Martinez (Spain) Camila Fassio Goyeneche	4–6 / 6–4 / 6–0	(Argentina) Julieta Bidahorria (Spain) Marta Caparros	
2/6/2026	(Argentina) Daiara Agustina Valenzuela (Brazil) Raquel Piltcher	7–5 / 6–4	(Spain) Letizia Manquillo (Spain) Noemi Aguilar	
2/6/2026	(Spain) Teresa Navarro (Argentina) Virginia Riera	6–4 / 7–5	(Spain) Barbara Las Heras (Spain) Carla Mesa	
2/6/2026	(Spain) Julia Polo Bautista (Spain) Marina Lobo	6–3 / 6–2	(Italy) Lorena Vano (Spain) Xenia Vidiella	
2/6/2026	(Spain) Maria Rodriguez Abajo (Spain) Noa Canovas	6–2 / 6–1	(Spain) Marta Arellano (Spain) Mónica Gómez	
2/6/2026	(Spain) Agueda Perez (Spain) Lucia Martinez	6–3 / 6–4	(Portugal) Ana Catarina Nogueira (Spain) Lara Arruabarrena	
2/6/2026	(Spain) Carmen Castillon (Spain) Maria Portillo	6–4 / 7–6	(Spain) Amanda Lopez Moral (France) Carla Touly	
2/6/2026	(Spain) Araceli Martinez (Spain) Laura Luján	6–2 / 6–4	(Italy) Caterina Baldi (Italy) Clarissa Margherita Aima	

=== Round of 32 ===
Men's

Date	Winners	Score	Opponent	Refs.
3/6/2026	(Argentina) Agustín Tapia (Spain) Arturo Coello	6–2 / 6–2	(Italy) Alvaro Montiel Caruso (Italy) Flavio Abbate	
3/6/2026	(Spain) David Gala Sánchez (Italy) Enzo Jensen	6–0 / 7–6	(Spain) Javier Garcia Mora (Spain) Jose Jimenez Casas	
3/6/2026	(Spain) Aléx Ruiz (Spain) Juanlu Esbri	6–3 / 7–6	(Spain) Francisco Cabeza (Paraguay) Mariano San Martin	
3/6/2026	(Spain) Javier Garrido (Brazil) Lucas Bergamini	6–3 / 7–5	(Spain) Daniel Santigosa (Spain) Marc Sintes	
3/6/2026	(Argentina) Martin Di Nenno (Spain) Paquito Navarro	6–3 / 6–1	(Spain) Alonso Rodriguez Martinez (Argentina) Juan De Pascual	
3/6/2026	(Spain) Aimar Goñi (Spain) Eduardo Alonso	6–3 / 6–4	(Argentina) Luciano Capra (Spain) Pincho Fernandez	
3/6/2026	(Brazil) Lucas Campagnolo (Spain) Momo González	6–3 / 6–3	(Spain) Mario Ortega (Spain) Victor Ruiz	
3/6/2026	(Argentina) Franco Stupaczuk (Spain) Mike Yanguas	5–7 / 7–6 / 6–3	(Spain) Francisco Gil Morales (Spain) Manuel Castaño	
3/6/2026	(Spain) Juan Lebrón (Argentina) Leandro Augsburger	6–3 / 6–4	(Spain) Albert Roglan Pons (Spain) Manuel Aragon Herrera	
3/6/2026	(Spain) Alex Arroyo (Argentina) Leonel Aguirre	6–2 / 6–4	(United Arab Emirates) Ignacio Vilariño (Spain) Mario Del Castillo	
3/6/2026	(Argentina) Juan Tello (Argentina) Maximiliano Arce	6–1 / 6–4	(Spain) Álvaro Cepero (Argentina) Eduardo Agustín Torre	
3/6/2026	(Spain) Coki Nieto (Spain) Jon Sanz	6–1 / 4–6 / 7–5	(Spain) Javier Martinez (Spain) Luis Hernandez Quesada	
3/6/2026	(Spain) Guillermo Collado (Spain) Pol Hernandez	7–6 / 6–4	(Spain) Francisco Guerrero (Spain) Javi Leal	
3/6/2026	(United Arab Emirates) Inigo Jofre (Spain) Jairo Bautista	6–2 / 6–4	(Spain) Álvaro Mélendez Amaya (Spain) Jose Luis Gonzalez	
3/6/2026	(Argentina) Gonzalo Alfonso (Spain) Javier Barahona	6–4 / 6–3	(Italy) Facundo Dominguez (Spain) Teodoro Zapata	
3/6/2026	(Spain) Alejandro Galán (Argentina) Federico Chingotto	6–1 / 6–4	(Argentina) Alex Chozas (Argentina) Valentino Libaak	

Women's

Date	Winners	Score	Opponent	Refs.
3/6/2026	(Spain) Jessica Castelló (Spain) Lorena Rufo	6–3 / 2–6 / 6–3	(Spain) Claudia Escacena (Spain) Patricia Martinez	
3/6/2026	(France) Alix Collombon (Russia) Ksenia Sharifova	6–3 / 6–2	(Spain) Lucia Peralta (Argentina) Maria Ferreyra	
3/6/2026	(Argentina) Claudia Jensen (Spain) Tamara Icardo	6–2 / 6–2	(Spain) Marta Talavan (Spain) Sofía Saiz Vallejo	
3/6/2026	(Italy) Giulia Dal Pozzo (Spain) Nuria Rodriguez	6–3 / 5–7 / 6–2	(Spain) Alejandra Alonso (Spain) Alejandra Salazar	
3/6/2026	(Italy) Carolina Orsi (Spain) Patricia Llaguno	6–3 / 6–1	(Spain) Aida Martinez (Spain) Camila Fassio Goyeneche	
3/6/2026	(Spain) Beatriz Caldera (Spain) Carmen Goenaga	6–3 / 6–3	(Argentina) Daiara Agustina Valenzuela (Brazil) Raquel Piltcher	
3/6/2026	(Argentina) Aranzazu Osoro (Spain) Victoria Iglesias	6–2 / 6–1	(Spain) Teresa Navarro (Argentina) Virginia Riera	
3/6/2026	(Spain) Jimena Velasco (Spain) Marta Barrera	4–6 / 7–6 / 7–6	(Spain) Julia Polo Bautista (Spain) Marina Lobo	
3/6/2026	(Spain) Maria Rodriguez Abajo (Spain) Noa Canovas	7–5 / 7–6	(Spain) Marina Guinart (Spain) Verónica Virseda	
3/6/2026	(Spain) Marta Ortega (Spain) Martina Calvo	7–6 / 6–4	(Spain) Agueda Perez (Spain) Lucia Martinez	
3/6/2026	(Spain) Lucía Sainz (Spain) Jana Montes	7–5 / 6–3	(Spain) Carmen Castillon (Spain) Maria Portillo	
3/6/2026	(Argentina) Martina Fassio Goyeneche (Spain) Raquel Eugenio Barrera	6–1 / 6–2	(Spain) Araceli Martinez (Spain) Laura Luján	

=== Round of 16 ===
Men's

Date	Winners	Score	Opponent	Refs.
4/6/2026	(Argentina) Agustín Tapia (Spain) Arturo Coello	6–1 / 6–1	(Spain) David Gala Sánchez (Italy) Enzo Jensen	
4/6/2026	(Spain) Javi Garrido (Brazil) Lucas Bergamini	6–1 / 6–3	(Spain) Aléx Ruiz (Spain) Juanlu Esbri	
4/6/2026	(Argentina) Martin Di Nenno (Spain) Paquito Navarro	6–2 / 6–4	(Spain) Aimar Goñi (Spain) Eduardo Alonso	
4/6/2026	(Brazil) Lucas Campagnolo (Spain) Momo González	6–4 / 7–6	(Argentina) Franco Stupaczuk (Spain) Mike Yanguas	
4/6/2026	(Spain) Juan Lebrón (Argentina) Leandro Augsburger	7–6 / 6–2	(Spain) Alex Arroyo (Argentina) Leonel Aguirre	
4/6/2026	(Spain) Coki Nieto (Spain) Jon Sanz	6–2 / 6–4	(Argentina) Juan Tello (Argentina) Maximiliano Arce'	
4/6/2026	(Spain) Guillermo Collado (Spain) Pol Hernandez	7–6 / 3–6 / 6–2	(United Arab Emirates) Inigo Jofre (Spain) Jairo Bautista	
4/6/2026	(Spain) Alejandro Galán (Argentina) Federico Chingotto	6–3 / 4–6 / 6–4	(Argentina) Gonzalo Alfonso (Spain) Javier Barahona	

Women's

Date	Winners	Score	Opponent	Refs.
4/6/2026	(Argentina) Delfina Brea (Spain) Gemma Triay	6–1 / 6–1	(Spain) Jessica Castelló (Spain) Lorena Rufo	
4/6/2026	(Argentina) Claudia Jensen (Spain) Tamara Icardo	6–1 / 6–0	(France) Alix Collombon (Russia) Ksenia Sharifova	
4/6/2026	(Italy) Giulia Dal Pozzo (Spain) Nuria Rodriguez	6–4 / 0–6 / 7–6	(Italy) Carolina Orsi (Spain) Patricia Llaguno	
4/6/2026	(Spain) Claudia Fernández (Portugal) Sofia Araújo	6–2 / 6–2	(Spain) Beatriz Caldera (Spain) Carmen Goenaga	
4/6/2026	(Spain) Andrea Ustero (Spain) Ariana Sánchez	6–4 / 6–3	(Argentina) Aranzazu Osoro (Spain) Victoria Iglesias	
4/6/2026	(Spain) Jimena Velasco (Spain) Marta Barrera	6–4 / 1–6 / 6–1	(Spain) Maria Rodriguez Abajo (Spain) Noa Canovas	
4/6/2026	(Spain) Marta Ortega (Spain) Martina Calvo	6–1 / 6–2	(Spain) Lucía Sainz (Spain) Jana Montes	
4/6/2026	(Spain) Bea González (Spain) Paula Josemaría	6–0 / 6–4	(Argentina) Martina Fassio Goyeneche (Spain) Raquel Eugenio Barrera	

=== Quarter-Finals ===
Men's

Date	Winners	Score	Opponent	Refs.
5/6/2026	(Argentina) Agustín Tapia (Spain) Arturo Coello	6–3 / 7–6	(Spain) Javi Garrido (Brazil) Lucas Bergamini	
5/6/2026	(Brazil) Lucas Campagnolo (Spain) Momo González	6–3 / 6–3	(Argentina) Martin Di Nenno (Spain) Paquito Navarro	
5/6/2026	(Spain) Juan Lebrón (Argentina) Leandro Augsburger	6–4 / 7–6	(Spain) Coki Nieto (Spain) Jon Sanz	
5/6/2026	(Spain) Alejandro Galán (Argentina) Federico Chingotto	6–3 / 6–1	(Spain) Guillermo Collado (Spain) Pol Hernandez	

Women's

Date	Winners	Score	Opponent	Refs.
5/6/2026	(Argentina) Delfina Brea (Spain) Gemma Triay	3–6 / 6–4 / 6–3	(Argentina) Claudia Jensen (Spain) Tamara Icardo	
5/6/2026	(Italy) Giulia Dal Pozzo (Spain) Nuria Rodriguez	3–6 / 6–3 / 6–2	(Spain) Claudia Fernández (Portugal) Sofia Araújo	
5/6/2026	(Spain) Andrea Ustero (Spain) Ariana Sánchez	6–1 / 6–2	(Spain) Jimena Velasco (Spain) Marta Barrera	
5/6/2026	(Spain) Bea González (Spain) Paula Josemaría	6–2 / 2–6 / 6–3	(Spain) Marta Ortega (Spain) Martina Calvo	

=== Semi-Finals ===
Men's

Date	Winners	Score	Opponent	Refs.
6/6/2026	(Argentina) Agustín Tapia (Spain) Arturo Coello	6–1 / 6–4	(Brazil) Lucas Campagnolo (Spain) Momo González	
6/6/2026	(Spain) Alejandro Galán (Argentina) Federico Chingotto	7–6 / 6–3	(Spain) Juan Lebrón (Argentina) Leandro Augsburger	

Women's

Date	Winners	Score	Opponent	Refs.
6/6/2026	(Argentina) Delfina Brea (Spain) Gemma Triay	6–3 / 6–3	(Italy) Giulia Dal Pozzo (Spain) Nuria Rodriguez	
6/6/2026	(Spain) Andrea Ustero (Spain) Ariana Sánchez	5–7 / 7–6 / 7–6	(Spain) Bea González (Spain) Paula Josemaría	

=== Finals ===
Men's

Date	Winners	Score	Opponent	Refs.
7/6/2026	(Argentina) Agustín Tapia (Spain) Arturo Coello	7–5 / 7–6	(Spain) Alejandro Galán (Argentina) Federico Chingotto	

Women's

Date	Winners	Score	Opponent	Refs.
7/6/2026	(Argentina) Delfina Brea (Spain) Gemma Triay	6–1 / 7–5	(Spain) Andrea Ustero (Spain) Ariana Sánchez	
