= 2023 WPT Chile Open =

Padel championships

- Date: 14 March – 19 March
- Edition: 1st
- Category: Open 1000
- Location: Santiago de Chile, Chile
- Venue: Complejo Deportivo San Carlos de Apoquindo

Champions
- Men's doubles: (Argentina) Agustín Tapia (Spain) Arturo Coello
- Women's doubles: (Spain) Alejandra Salazar (Spain) Gemma Triay

Chronology

The WPT Chile Open 2023 (officially WPT BTG Pactual Chile Padel Open 1000 2023) was the third tournament of the eleventh edition of World Padel Tour. The final phase was played between March 14 and 19, 2023 in the Complejo Deportivo San Carlos de Apoquindo, facilities of the Club Deportivo Universidad Católica of Santiago de Chile, while the preliminary phase was played between February 13 and 15 at the "Euroindoor" in Madrid, Spain.

In the women's category, Alejandra Salazar and Gemma Triay won the title due to the withdrawal of Claudia Jensen and Jessica Castelló due to the Argentine's indisposition, when the match was 6–1 and 1–0 in favor of the number 2 pair.

In the men's category, Agustín Tapia and Arturo Coello defeated (twice) the number 1 seeds Alejandro Galán and Juan Lebrón in a match that witnessed one of the biggest controversies of recent years; due to an officiating error in the scoring and Galán's timely intervention when the Spanish-Argentine duo were already celebrating victory in the second set, the match continued with 5–3 and a golden point (when it should have ended 6–3) which the number 1 seeds won, before winning the set in the tie-break, and it had to be in the third set that Tapia and Coello celebrated the victory, 6–4, 6–7 and 7–5.

== Relevant data ==
=== First tournament in Chile ===
This tournament marked the first time World Padel Tour had been held in Chile, and new countries are gradually being added to the calendar. Javier Valdés González, the most prominent Chilean padel player, received a wildcard entry into the tournament, directly from the round of 32, alongside his partner Facundo Domínguez.

=== Controversy in the men's final ===
The men's final pitted the world's number one and number two pairs, Alejandro Galán and Juan Lebrón, against Agustín Tapia and Arturo Coello in the same final as the 2023 Abu Dhabi Master. The match was very intense with the Spanish-Argentine duo winning the first set 6–4 and, after securing a break in the second, went up 5–3 and had a chance to serve for the match.

At 30–30, Coello responded to Lebrón's return from the side wall with a quick smash down the middle, which went in just wide, but it was clear from the live broadcast that the shot was good; no one disputed it. Therefore, two match points. Tapia won the next point with a powerful three-point smash that Galán couldn't reach, so the match ended 6–4, 6–3. But while Tapia and Coello were celebrating and Lebrón waited at the net to shake their hands, Galán arrived looking puzzled, saying that it was now 40–40 and that they would play the golden point.

The referee, Honorio García, announced over the PA system, "Game, set, and match," but Galán persisted, insisting, "You called it 30-40 earlier." Incredulous, the players went to ask the referee for an explanation. He replied that he had made a mistake on the penultimate point; it turned out that after Coello's smash, he had called "30–40" (point for Lebrón-Galán), but only the Madrid native heard it. He said nothing, as did the other three players, who continued playing, assuming the ball was in.

Finally, the umpire ruled that play should continue at 5–3 and 40–40. The crowd erupted, and Coello, having already celebrated the victory and shaken hands with his opponents, couldn't believe it: "I can't go back onto the court." However, the decision had been made: "Play on." The golden point was put into play; it was still match point for the number 2 seeds, but they lost it, and later they also lost the second set in a tie-break. The crowd showed their complete disagreement with what had happened; from the moment of the controversy, they booed loudly on several occasions and celebrated every point won by Tapia and Coello. They were able to get back into the game and ended up winning the third set 7–5. It was one of the biggest padel controversies of recent times.

This incident had a major impact. The social media accounts of both the World Padel Tour, Galán and Lebrón were flooded with comments criticizing their behavior, arguing that they knew they had lost the match, and that in the golden point following the incident they should have deliberately missed the return, thus giving the victory to Arturo Coello and Agustín Tapia.

=== Withdrawals ===
In the men's draw, the situation was slightly better than at the La Rioja Open. A total of 6 pairs who had registered and were going to compete in the main draw encountered setbacks that complicated their participation. Pairs 2, 19, 25, 26 and pair A were unable to play due to injuries, so the main draw had to be modified. However, Alex Arroyo's injury did not prevent his partner, Miguel Yanguas, from competing in the tournament, as he ultimately played with Leandro Augsburger by taking advantage of the "lucky loser" rule, since he had been eliminated in the preliminary rounds.

In the women's draw, however, a very unusual situation occurred; the 8th and 13th ranked pairs, made up of Tamara Icardo and Virginia Riera and Carolina Navarro and Mª Carmen Villalba, missed the deadline to register for the tournament (in the case of the Malaga pair, by 10 minutes), so they could not participate.

== Registered teams ==
Male

Rnk.	Team	WPT Ranking Points
1	(Spain) Alejandro Galán (Spain) Juan Lebrón	33.440
2	(Argentina) Agustín Tapia (Spain) Arturo Coello	20.485
3	(Argentina) Juan Tello (Spain) Paquito Navarro	15.550
4	(Argentina) Franco Stupaczuk (Argentina) Martín Di Nenno	15.525
5	(Spain) Alejandro Ruiz (Spain) Momo González	11.160
6	(Spain) Coki Nieto (Brazil) Pablo Lima	10.736
7	(Argentina) Federico Chingotto (Spain) Javi Garrido	9.895
8	(Brazil) Lucas Campagnolo (Argentina) Maxi Sánchez	8.100
9	(Argentina) Agustín Gutiérrez (Argentina) Lucho Capra	6.581
10	(Spain) Javier Leal (Spain) Jon Sanz	4.746
11	(Spain) Francisco Gil (Argentina) Ramiro Moyano	4.339
12	(Spain) Gonzalo Rubio (Spain) Javier Ruiz	3.996
13	(Argentina) Juan Cruz Belluati (Argentina) Miguel Lamperti	3.947
14	(Spain) José García Diestro (Spain) Pincho Fernández	3.524
15	(Spain) Josete Rico (Spain) Salvador Oria	3.442
16	(Brazil) Lucas Bergamini (Spain) Víctor Ruiz	3.431
17	(Spain) Eduardo Alonso (Spain) Juanlu Esbri	2.935
18	(Argentina) Leo Augsburger (Spain) Miguel Yanguas	2.847
19	(Argentina) Agustín Gomez Silingo (Spain) Juan Martín Díaz	2.741
20	(Spain) Javier García Mora (Spain) Javier González Barahona	2.525
21	(Spain) Antón Sans (Spain) Teodoro Zapata	2.219
22	(Spain) Ignacio Vilariño (Spain) Jaime Muñoz	2.001
23	(Spain) Javier Martínez Vázquez (Spain) Rafael Méndez	1.755
(W.C.)	(Italy) Facundo Domínguez (Chile) Javier Valdés	1.048
Qualified from the preliminary rounds
B	(Spain) Francisco Guerrero (Spain) Jesús Moya	1.514
C	(Spain) Daniel Santigosa (Spain) David Gala	466
D	(Spain) Iván Ramírez (Spain) Pablo Cardona	1.645

Female

Rnk.	Team	WPT Ranking Points
1	(Spain) Alejandra Salazar (Spain) Gemma Triay	33.060
2	(Spain) Ariana Sánchez (Spain) Paula Josemaría	32.390
3	(Spain) Bea González (Spain) Marta Ortega	16.926
4	(Spain) Victoria Iglesias (Spain) Patty Llaguno	10.448
5	(Argentina) Aranza Osoro (Spain) Lucía Sainz	10.075
6	(Spain) Bárbara Las Heras (Spain) Verónica Virseda	9.770
7	(Spain) Majo Sánchez Alayeto (Spain) Mapi Sánchez Alayeto	9.145
8	(Argentina) Delfina Brea (Portugal) Sofia Araújo	6.641
9	(Argentina) Claudia Jensen (Spain) Jessica Castelló	4.995
10	(France) Alix Collombon (Spain) Carla Mesa	4.907
11	(Spain) Lorena Rufo (Spain) Marta Talaván	4.383
12	(Spain) Esther Carnicero (Spain) Lucía Martínez	3.601
13	(Spain) Beatriz Caldera (Spain) Carmen Goenaga	3.383
14	(Portugal) Ana Catarina Nogueira (Spain) Eli Amatriaín	3.135
15	(Spain) Marina Guinart (Spain) Nuria Rodríguez	3.084
16	(Spain) Claudia Fernández (Argentina) Julieta Bidahorria	3.063
17	(Spain) Marta Barrera (Spain) Marta Caparrós	2.671
18	(Spain) Anna Cortiles (Spain) Sofía Saiz	2.474
19	(Spain) Araceli Martínez (Spain) Noa Cánovas	2.470
20	(Spain) Alejandra Alonso (Spain) Melania Merino	2.391
21	(Spain) Marina Martínez (Spain) Teresa Navarro	2.340
22	(Spain) Alicia Blanco (Spain) Arantxa Soriano	2.186
23	(Italy) Carolina Orsi (France) Léa Godallier	2.148
(W.C.)	(Chile) Andrea Koch (Argentina) Mª Laura Ferreyra	15
Qualified from the preliminary rounds
A	(Italy) Emily Stellato (Italy) Giulia Sussarello	1.925
B	(Spain) Ariadna Cañellas (Spain) ~~Sandra Bellver~~ (Note: Ariadna and Sandra both qualified for the main draw, but Sandra was injured, so Ariadna chose Ksenia to play in her place. In fact, Sandra and Ariadna will go their separate ways after the tournament.) (Russia) Ksenia Sharifova	~~1.505~~; 1.118
C	(Spain) Ana Fernandez de Ossó (Spain) Lara Arruabarrena	905
D	(Spain) Águeda Pérez (Spain) Sara Ruiz	1.304

== Schedule ==
The matches began on Saturday at the Euroindoor Alcorcón club with the preliminary rounds.

- Monday 13: Men's qualifying rounds 1 and 2.
- Tuesday 14: Men's qualifying round 3 and women's qualifying rounds 1 and 2.
- Wednesday 15: Final qualifying rounds for both men and women.

The final draw is played a month later:

- Tuesday 14: Round of 32.
- Wednesday 15: Round of 32.
- Thursday 16: Round of 16.
- Friday 17: Quarterfinals.
- Saturday 18: Semifinals.
- Sunday 19: Finals.

== Results ==
=== Men's Bracket ===
Round of 32
1	(Spain) Galán / (Spain) Lebrón
Bye
(Spain) Santigosa / (Spain) D. Gala (C)	6	7
(Italy) Domínguez / (Chile) Valdés (W.C.)	3	6
(Spain) J.G. Mora / (Spain) J.G. Barahona	7	6	6
(Spain) J. Moya / (Spain) F. Guerrero (B)	6	7	1
(Spain) A. Sans / (Spain) T. Zapata	6	6	2
6	(Spain) Coki / (Brazil) Lima	4	7	6
7	(Spain) Garrido / (Argentina) Chingotto	7	6
(Spain) J. Esbri / (Spain) E. Alonso	6	2
(Spain) Javi R. / (Spain) G. Rubio	6	6
(Spain) Josete Rico / (Spain) S. Oria	3	3
(Argentina) Silingo / (Argentina) J.M. Díaz	1	1
(Spain) Pincho / (Spain) J.G. Diestro	6	6
Bye
3	(Argentina) Tello / (Spain) Paquito
4	(Argentina) Stupaczuk / (Argentina) Di Nenno
Bye
(Spain) J. Muñoz / (Spain) I. Vilariño	6	6
(Argentina) Augsburger (L.L.) / (Spain) Yanguas	7	7
(Spain) Ivan R. / (Spain) P. Cardona (D)	7	3	7
(Argentina) Moyano / (Spain) Xisco	6	6	6
(Argentina) Belluati / (Argentina) Lamperti	4	6	6
8	(Argentina) Maxi / (Brazil) Campagnolo	6	3	7
5	(Spain) Álex / (Spain) Momo
Bye
(Spain) Leal / (Spain) Sanz	6	4
(Argentina) A. Gutiérrez / (Argentina) Lucho	7	6
(Spain) Méndez / (Spain) Martínez	6	6
(Brazil) Bergamini / (Spain) V. Ruiz	4	4
Bye
2	(Argentina) Tapia / (Spain) Coello

Round of 16
1	(Spain) Galán / (Spain) Lebrón	6	6
(Spain) Santigosa / (Spain) D. Gala (C)	0	3
(Spain) J.G. Mora / (Spain) J.G. Barahona	4	6	6
6	(Spain) Coki / (Brazil) Lima	6	3	4
7	(Argentina) Chingotto / (Spain) Garrido	7	6	7
(Spain) Javi R. / (Spain) G. Rubio	5	7	6
(Spain) Pincho / (Spain) J.G. Diestro	6	7	6
3	(Argentina) Tello / (Spain) Paquito	7	6	3
4	(Argentina) Stupaczuk / (Argentina) Di Nenno	6	6
(Argentina) Augsburger (L.L.) / (Spain) Yanguas	2	3
(Spain) Ivanxo / (Spain) P. Cardona (D)	6	3	6
8	(Argentina) Maxi / (Brazil) Campagnolo	2	6	7
5	(Spain) Álex / (Spain) Momo	4	4
(Argentina) A. Gutiérrez / (Argentina) Lucho	6	6
(Spain) Méndez / (Spain) Martínez	6	1	3
2	(Argentina) Tapia / (Spain) Coello	4	6	6

Quarter-Final
1	(Spain) Galán / (Spain) Lebrón	6	6
(Spain) J.G. Mora / (Spain) J.G. Barahona	4	4
7	(Argentina) Chingotto / (Spain) Garrido	6	3	3
(Spain) Pincho / (Spain) J.G. Diestro	3	6	6
4	(Argentina) Stupaczuk / (Argentina) Di Nenno	6	6
8	(Argentina) Maxi / (Brazil) Campagnolo	3	2
(Argentina) A. Gutiérrez / (Argentina) Lucho	6	2
2	(Argentina) Tapia / (Spain) Coello	7	6

Semi-Finals
1	(Spain) Galán / (Spain) Lebrón	4	6	6
(Spain) Pincho / (Spain) J.G. Diestro	6	3	4
4	(Argentina) Stupaczuk / (Argentina) Di Nenno	4	3
2	(Argentina) Tapia / (Spain) Coello	6	6

Finals
1	(Spain) Galán / (Spain) Lebrón	4	7	5
2	(Argentina) Tapia / (Spain) Coello	6	6	7

=== Men's Bracket ===
Round of 32
1	(Spain) Salazar / (Spain) Triay
Bye
(Spain) M. Barrera / (Spain) M. Caparrós	6	1	7
(Italy) Sussarello / (Italy) Stellato (A)	3	6	6
(Portugal) A. Nogueira / (Spain) Amatriaín	2	1
(Argentina) Bidahorria / (Spain) Claudia F.	6	6
(Italy) C. Orsi / (France) Godallier	2	2
6	(Spain) Virseda / (Spain) Bárbara	6	6
8	(Portugal) S. Araújo / (Argentina) Delfi	6	6
(Spain) Araceli / (Spain) Cánovas	3	2
(Spain) Arantxa / (Spain) A. Blanco	2	3
(Spain) Ana Fdez./ (Spain) Lara A. (C)	6	6
(Spain) A. Alonso / (Spain) M. Merino	3	7	2
(France) Collombon / (Spain) Mesa	6	6	6
Bye
3	(Spain) Bea / (Spain) Martita
4	(Spain) Victoria / (Spain) Patty
Bye
(Spain) Talaván / (Spain) L. Rufo	6	6
(Spain) Marina M. / (Spain) Teresa N.	3	4
(Spain) Guinart / (Spain) Nuria R.	6	6
(Chile) A. Koch / (Argentina) Ferreyra (W.C.)	2	0
(Spain) Cañellas/ (Russia) Ksenia (L.L.) (B)	2	5
5	(Argentina) Aranza / (Spain) Sainz	6	7
7	(Spain) Majo / (Spain) Mapi	6	6
(Spain) Carnicero / (Spain) Lucía M.	4	1
(Spain) Águeda / (Spain) Sara R. (D)	1	0
(Spain) Castelló / (Argentina) Jensen	6	6
(Spain) S. Saiz / (Spain) A. Cortiles	5	6	2
(Spain) Caldera / (Spain) Goenaga	7	4	6
Bye
2	(Spain) Ariana / (Spain) Paula

Round of 16
1	(Spain) Triay / (Spain) Salazar	6	6
(Spain) M. Barrera / (Spain) M. Caparrós	4	1
(Spain) Bidahorria / (Spain) Claudia F.	4	6
6	(Spain) Bárbara / (Spain) Virseda	6	7
8	(Argentina) Delfi / (Portugal) S. Araújo	6	6
(Spain) Ana Fdez./ (Spain) Lara A. (C)	1	1
(France) Collombon / (Spain) Mesa	4	6	6
3	(Spain) Bea / (Spain) Martita	6	2	3
4	(Spain) Victoria / (Spain) Patty	4	7	6
(Spain) Talaván / (Spain) L. Rufo	6	5	4
(Spain) Guinart / (Spain) Nuria R.	2	3
5	(Argentina) Aranza / (Spain) Sainz	6	6
7	(Spain) Majo / (Spain) Mapi	1	6
(Spain) Castelló / (Argentina) Jensen	6	7
(Spain) Caldera / (Spain) Goenaga	3	1
2	(Spain) Ariana / (Spain) Paula	6	6

Quarter-Final
1	(Spain) Salazar / (Spain) Triay	6	6
6	(Spain) Bárbara / (Spain) Virseda	0	1
8	(Argentina) Delfi / (Portugal) S. Araújo	6	6
(France) Collombon / (Spain) Mesa	3	1
4	(Spain) Victoria / (Spain) Patty	4	4
5	(Argentina) Aranza / (Spain) Sainz	6	6
(Spain) Castelló / (Argentina) Jensen	6	7
2	(Spain) Ariana / (Spain) Paula	3	6

Semi-Finals
1	(Spain) Salazar / (Spain) Triay	7	4	7
8	(Argentina) Delfi / (Portugal) S. Araújo	6	6	6
5	(Argentina) Aranza / (Spain) Sainz	6	6
(Spain) Castelló / (Argentina) Jensen	7	7

Finals
1	(Spain) Salazar / (Spain) Triay	6	1
(Spain) Castelló / (Argentina) Jensen (inj.)	1	0

=== Final qualifying round ===
Men's

Data	Qualified	WPT Ranking Point	Opponents	Result
A	(Spain) Álvaro Cepero (Spain) Arnau Ayats	1688 vs 1324	(Spain) Jaime Fermosell (Spain) José Jiménez Casas	6–4 / 7–5
B	(Spain) Francisco Guerrero (Spain) Jesús Moya	1514 vs 228	(Argentina) Aris Patiniotis (Spain) Ignacio Sager	6–3 / 6–0
C	(Spain) Daniel Santigosa (Spain) David Gala	466 vs 314	(Argentina) Leandro Augsburger (Argentina) Valentino Libaak	6–3 / 6–4
D	(Spain) Iván Ramírez (Spain) Pablo Cardona	1645 vs 466	(Spain) Carlos Martí (Spain) Mario Ortega	6–3 / 6–7 / 6–3

Women's

Data	Qualified	WPT Ranking Point	Opponents	Result
A	(Italy) Giulia Sussarello (Italy) Emily Stellato	1925 vs 1442	(Spain) Julia Polo (Spain) Nicole Traviesa	6–3 / 6–4
B	(Spain) Ariadna Cañellas (Spain) Sandra Bellver	1505 vs 1880	(Russia) Ksenia Sharifova (Spain) Patricia Martínez	4–6 / 7–6 / 6–1
C	(Spain) Ana Fernandez de Ossó (Spain) Lara Arruabarrena	905 vs 1390	(Spain) Lourdes Pascual (Spain) Raquel Segura	6–4 / 3–6 / 6–3
D	(Spain) Águeda Pérez (Spain) Sara Ruiz	1304 vs 1884	(Spain) Lorena Alonso (Spain) Sandra Hernández	7–6 / 4–6 / 6–3

=== Round of 32 ===
Men's

Date	Team A	Score	Team B	Refs.
14/3/2023	(Spain) Rafael Méndez (Spain) Javier Martínez	6–4 / 6–4	(Brazil) Lucas Bergamini (Spain) Víctor Ruiz Remedios	
14/3/2023	(Spain) Javier García Mora (Spain) Javier González Barahona	7–6 / 6–7 / 6–1	(Spain) Francisco Guerrero (Spain) Jesús Moya	
14/3/2023	(Spain) Iván Ramírez (Spain) Pablo Cardona	7–6 / 3–6 / 7–6	(Spain) Francisco Gil (Argentina) Ramiro Moyano	
14/3/2023	(Spain) Antón Sans (Spain) Teodoro Zapata	6–4 / 6–7 / 2–6	(Spain) Coki Nieto (Brazil) Pablo Lima	
15/3/2023	(Spain) Gonzalo Rubio (Spain) Javier Ruiz	6–3 / 6–3	(Spain) Josete Rico (Spain) Salvador Oria	
15/3/2023	(Argentina) Federico Chingotto (Spain) Javi Garrido	7–6 / 6–2	(Spain) Eduardo Alonso (Spain) Juanlu Esbri	
15/3/2023	(Argentina) Agustín G. Silingo (Spain) Juan Martín Díaz	1–6 / 1–6	(Spain) José García Diestro (Spain) Pincho Fernández	
15/3/2023	(Argentina) Juan Cruz Belluati (Argentina) Miguel Lamperti	4–6 / 6–3 / 6–7	(Argentina) Maxi Sánchez (Brazil) Lucas Campagnolo	
15/3/2023	(Spain) Ignacio Vilariño (Spain) Jaime Muñoz	6–7 / 6–7	(Argentina) Leo Augsburger (Spain) Miguel Yanguas	
15/3/2023	(Spain) Daniel Santigosa (Spain) David Gala	6–3 / 7–6	(Italy) Facundo Domínguez (Chile) Javier Valdés	
15/3/2023	(Spain) Javier Leal (Spain) Jon Sanz	6–7 / 4–6	(Argentina) Agustín Gutiérrez (Argentina) Lucho Capra	

Women's

Date	Team A	Score	Team B	Refs.
15/3/2023	(Italy) Carolina Orsi (France) Léa Godallier	2–6 / 2–6	(Spain) Bárbara Las Heras (Spain) Verónica Virseda	
15/3/2023	(Spain) Majo Sánchez Alayeto (Spain) Mapi Sánchez Alayeto	6–4 / 6–1	(Spain) Esther Carnicero (Spain) Lucía Martínez	
15/3/2023	(Spain) Águeda Pérez (Spain) Sara Ruiz	1–6 / 0–6	(Argentina) Claudia Jensen (Spain) Jessica Castelló	
15/3/2023	(Spain) Anna Cortiles (Spain) Sofía Saiz	5–7 / 6–4 / 2–6	(Spain) Beatriz Caldera (Spain) Carmen Goenaga	
15/3/2023	(Spain) Ariadna Cañellas (Russia) Ksenia Sharifova	2–6 / 5–7	(Argentina) Aranza Osoro (Spain) Lucía Sainz	
15/3/2023	(Portugal) Ana Catarina Nogueira (Spain) Eli Amatriaín	2–6 / 1–6	(Spain) Claudia Fernández (Argentina) Julieta Bidahorria	
15/3/2023	(Spain) Marta Barrera (Spain) Marta Caparrós	6–3 / 1–6 / 7–6	(Italy) Emily Stellato (Italy) Giulia Sussarello	
15/3/2023	(Spain) Lorena Rufo (Spain) Marta Talaván	6–3 / 6–4	(Spain) Marina Martínez (Spain) Teresa Navarro	
15/3/2023	(Spain) Marina Guinart (Spain) Nuria Rodríguez	6–2 / 6–0	(Chile) Andrea Koch (Argentina) Mª Laura Ferreyra	
15/3/2023	(Argentina) Delfina Brea (Portugal) Sofia Araújo	6–3 / 6–2	(Spain) Araceli Martínez (Spain) Noa Cánovas	
15/3/2023	(Spain) Alicia Blanco (Spain) Arantxa Soriano	2–6 / 3–6	(Spain) Ana Fernandez de Ossó (Spain) Lara Arruabarrena	
15/3/2023	(Spain) Alejandra Alonso (Spain) Melania Merino	3–6 / 7–6 / 2–6	(France) Alix Collombon (Spain) Carla Mesa	

=== Round of 16 ===
Men's

Date	Team A	Score	Team B	Refs.
16/3/2023	(Spain) Javier García Mora (Spain) Javier González Barahona	4–6 / 6–3 / 6–4	(Spain) Coki Nieto (Brazil) Pablo Lima	
16/3/2023	(Spain) José García Diestro (Spain) Pincho Fernández	6–7 / 7–6 / 6–3	(Argentina) Juan Tello (Spain) Paquito Navarro	
16/3/2023	(Spain) Alejandro Galán (Spain) Juan Lebrón	6–0 / 6–3	(Spain) Daniel Santigosa (Spain) David Gala	
16/3/2023	(Argentina) Federico Chingotto (Spain) Javi Garrido	7–5 / 6–7 / 7–6	(Spain) Gonzalo Rubio (Spain) Javier Ruiz	
16/3/2023	(Argentina) Franco Stupaczuk (Argentina) Martín Di Nenno	6–2 / 6–3	(Argentina) Leo Augsburger (Spain) Miguel Yanguas	
16/3/2023	(Spain) Iván Ramírez (Spain) Pablo Cardona	6–2 / 3–6 / 6–7	(Argentina) Maxi Sánchez (Brazil) Lucas Campagnolo	
16/3/2023	(Spain) Rafael Méndez (Spain) Javier Martínez	6–4 / 1–6 / 3–6	(Argentina) Agustín Tapia (Spain) Arturo Coello	
16/3/2023	(Spain) Alex Ruiz (Spain) Momo González	4–6 / 4–6	(Argentina) Agustín Gutiérrez (Argentina) Lucho Capra	

Women's

Date	Team A	Score	Team B	Refs.
16/3/2023	(Spain) Beatriz Caldera (Spain) Carmen Goenaga	3–6 / 1–6	(Spain) Ariana Sánchez (Spain) Paula Josemaría	
16/3/2023	(Spain) Victoria Iglesias (Spain) Patty Llaguno	4–6 / 7–5 / 6–4	(Spain) Lorena Rufo (Spain) Marta Talaván	
16/3/2023	(Spain) Marina Guinart (Spain) Nuria Rodríguez	2–6 / 3–6	(Argentina) Aranza Osoro (Spain) Lucía Sainz	
16/3/2023	(Spain) Majo Sánchez Alayeto (Spain) Mapi Sánchez Alayeto	1–6 / 6–7	(Argentina) Claudia Jensen (Spain) Jessica Castelló	
16/3/2023	(Spain) Alejandra Salazar (Spain) Gemma Triay	6–4 / 6–1	(Spain) Marta Barrera (Spain) Marta Caparrós	
16/3/2023	(Spain) Claudia Fernández (Argentina) Julieta Bidahorria	4–6 / 6–7	(Spain) Bárbara Las Heras (Spain) Verónica Virseda	
16/3/2023	(France) Alix Collombon (Spain) Carla Mesa	4–6 / 6–2 / 6–3	(Spain) Bea González (Spain) Marta Ortega	
16/3/2023	(Argentina) Delfina Brea (Portugal) Sofia Araújo	6–1 / 6–1	(Spain) Ana Fernandez de Ossó (Spain) Lara Arruabarrena	

=== Quarter-Finals ===
Men's

Date	Team A	Score	Team B	Refs.
17/3/2023	(Argentina) Federico Chingotto (Spain) Javi Garrido	6–3 / 3–6 / 3–6	(Spain) Pincho Fernández (Spain) José García Diestro	
17/3/2023	(Spain) Alejandro Galán (Spain) Juan Lebrón	6–4 / 6–4	(Spain) Javier García Mora (Spain) Javier González Barahona	
17/3/2023	(Argentina) Franco Stupaczuk (Argentina) Martín Di Nenno	6–3 / 6–2	(Argentina) Maxi Sánchez (Brazil) Lucas Campagnolo	
17/3/2023	(Argentina) Agustín Gutiérrez (Argentina) Lucho Capra	6–7 / 2–6	(Argentina) Agustín Tapia (Spain) Arturo Coello	

Women's

Date	Team A	Score	Team B	Refs.
17/3/2023	(Spain) Jessica Castelló (Argentina) Claudia Jensen	6–3 / 7–6	(Spain) Ariana Sánchez (Spain) Paula Josemaría	
17/3/2023	(Spain) Victoria Iglesias (Spain) Patty Llaguno	4–6 / 4–6	(Argentina) Aranza Osoro (Spain) Lucía Sainz	
17/3/2023	(Spain) Alejandra Salazar (Spain) Gemma Triay	6–0 / 6–1	(Spain) Bárbara Las Heras (Spain) Verónica Virseda	
17/3/2023	(Argentina) Delfina Brea (Portugal) Sofia Araújo	6–3 / 6–1	(France) Alix Collombon (Spain) Carla Mesa	

=== Semifinals ===
Men's

Date	Team A	Score	Team B	Refs.
18/3/2023	(Spain) Alejandro Galán (Spain) Juan Lebrón	4–6 / 6–3 / 6–4	(Spain) José García Diestro (Spain) Pincho Fernández	
18/3/2023	(Argentina) Franco Stupaczuk (Argentina) Martín Di Nenno	4–6 / 3–6	(Argentina) Agustín Tapia (Spain) Arturo Coello	

Women's

Date	Team A	Score	Team B	Refs.
18/3/2023	(Argentina) Aranza Osoro (Spain) Lucía Sainz	6–7 / 6–7	(Argentina) Claudia Jensen (Spain) Jessica Castelló	
18/3/2023	(Spain) Alejandra Salazar (Spain) Gemma Triay	7–6 / 4–6 / 7–6	(Argentina) Delfina Brea (Portugal) Sofia Araújo	

=== Finals ===
Men's

Date	Team A	Score	Team B	Refs.
19/3/2023	(Spain) Alejandro Galán (Spain) Juan Lebrón	4–6 / 6–7 / 5–7 (Note: This is the "official" result, as the match should have ended with a victory for Tapia and Coello by 6-4 and 6-3.)	(Argentina) Agustín Tapia (Spain) Arturo Coello	

Women's

Date	Team A	Score	Team B	Refs.
19/3/2023	(Spain) Alejandra Salazar (Spain) Gemma Triay	6–1 / 1–0 (*inj)	(Argentina) Claudia Jensen* (Spain) Jessica Castelló	
