= 2023 Madrid Master =

Padel championships

- Date: 16 – 24 September
- Edition: 9th
- Category: Master
- Location: Madrid, Spain
- Venue: Caja Mágica

Champions
- Men's doubles: (Argentina) Franco Stupaczuk (Argentina) Martin Di Nenno
- Women's doubles: (Spain) Ariana Sánchez (Spain) Paula Josemaría

Chronology
Previous
Paris Major (PP)
Next
Germany Open

The WPT 2023 Madrid Master (officially WPT 2023 Sixt Comunidad de Madrid Master) was the sixteenth tournament of the eleventh edition of World Padel Tour. The tournament was played between 16th and 24th September of 2023 at Caja Mágica, Spain.

In the women's category, the first and second ranked pairs met in the finals, with the number one team, Ariana Sánchez and Paula Josemaría, winning their tenth title of the season after defeating Gemma Triay and Marta Ortega in the finals.

In the men's category, the second ranked duo Franco Stupaczuk and Martin Di Nenno won their sixth title of the season, beating the number one rankeds Agustín Tapia and Arturo Coello, achieving their fourth finals win in the last six tournaments.

== Schedule ==
The final draw was played:

- Thursday 20 September: Round of 32.
- Thursday 21 September: Round of 16.
- Friday 22 September: Quarterfinals.
- Saturday 23 September: Semifinals.
- Sunday 24 September: Finals.

== Results ==
=== Men's Bracket ===
Round of 32
1	(Spain) Coello / (Argentina) Tapia	6	6
(Spain) A. Arroyo / (Spain) G. Rubio	4	1
(Spain) E. Alonso / (Spain) J. Esbri	6	6	6
(Spain) J.M. Díaz / (Argentina) M. Lamperti	7	2	2
(Spain) J. Leal / (Spain) J.G. Diestro	6	6
(Argentina) N. Suescun / (Spain) J.M. Vazquez	1	4
(Spain) I. Vilariño / (Spain) S. Oria	7	4	5
5	(Spain) A. Ruiz / (Argentina) J. Tello	6	6	7
6	(Argentina) F. Belasteguín / (Spain) Yanguas	6	6
(Spain) P. Cardona / (Spain) P. Fernandez	4	3
(Argentina) A. Chozas / (Spain) A. Cepero	5	2
(Argentina) L. Capra / (Argentina) Maxi	7	6
(Argentina) A. Gutiérrez / (Argentina) Sanyo	6	*
(Spain) J. Ruiz / (Spain) J. Rico	2
(Argentina) A. Silingo / (Brazil) Lima	3	3
3	(Spain) Galán / (Spain) Lebrón	6	6
4	(Argentina) Chingotto / (Spain) Paquito	6	6
(Spain) F. Gil / (Argentina) R. Moyano	3	2
(Spain) J.G. Mora / (Spain) J.G. Barahona	0	1
(Brazil) L. Bergamini / (Spain) V. Ruiz	6	6
(Spain) A. Ayats / (Spain) F. Guerrero	2	2
(Spain) J. Rico / (Spain) R. Méndez	6	6
(Spain) I. Ramírez / (Spain) P.G. Rodrigo=	4	4
7	(Spain) J. Garrido / (Spain) Momo	6	6
8	(Spain) Coki Nieto / (Spain) Jon Sanz	6	6
(Spain) I. Jofre / (Spain) M.G. García	2	2
(Spain) J. Bautista / (Spain) J. Muñoz	3	7	6
(Spain) J. Ruiz / (Argentina) J.C. Belluati	6	5	3
(Argentina) L. Augsburger / (Argentina) V. Libaak	2	1
(Spain) M. del Castillo / (Spain) M. Benítez	6	6
(Spain) A. Marqués / (Spain) M. Huete	0	2
2	(Argentina) F. Stupaczuk / (Argentina) Di Nenno	6	6

Round of 16
1	(Spain) Coello / (Argentina) Tapia	6	6
(Spain) E. Alonso / (Spain) J. Esbri	4	0
(Spain) J. Leal / (Spain) J.G. Diestro	6	6	6
5	(Spain) A. Ruiz / (Argentina) J. Tello	7	3	4
6	(Argentina) F. Belasteguín / (Spain) Yanguas	3	2
(Argentina) L. Capra / (Argentina) Maxi	6	6
(Argentina) A. Gutiérrez / (Argentina) Sanyo	4	7	6
3	(Spain) Galán / (Spain) Lebrón	6	6	4
4	(Argentina) Chingotto / (Spain) Paquito	6	4	6
(Brazil) L. Bergamini / (Spain) V. Ruiz	2	6	3
(Spain) J. Rico / (Spain) R. Méndez
7	(Spain) J. Garrido / (Spain) Momo	*
8	(Spain) Coki / (Spain) J. Sanz	6	4	6
(Spain) J. Bautista / (Spain) J. Muñoz	1	6	1
(Spain) M. del Castillo / (Spain) M. Benítez	1	1
2	(Argentina) F. Stupaczuk / (Argentina) Di Nenno	6	6

Quarter-Final
1	(Spain) Coello / (Argentina) Tapia	4	7	6
(Spain) J. Leal / (Spain) J.G. Diestro	6	5	4
(Argentina) L. Capra / (Argentina) Maxi	3	6	6
(Argentina) A. Gutiérrez / (Argentina) Sanyo	6	1	7
4	(Argentina) Chingotto / (Spain) Paquito	6	6
7	(Spain) J. Garrido / (Spain) Momo	4	0
8	(Spain) Coki / (Spain) J. Sanz	6	1	4
2	(Argentina) F. Stupaczuk / (Argentina) Di Nenno	3	6	6

Semi-Finals
1	(Spain) Coello / (Argentina) Tapia	6	6
(Argentina) A. Gutiérrez / (Argentina) Sanyo	1	0
4	(Argentina) Chingotto / (Spain) Paquito	7	6	0
2	(Argentina) F. Stupaczuk / (Argentina) Di Nennp	5	7	6

Finals
1	(Spain) Coello / (Argentina) Tapia	5	4
2	(Argentina) F. Stupaczuk / (Argentina) Di Nenno	7	6

=== Women's Bracket ===
Round of 32
1	(Spain) A. Sánchez / (Spain) P. Josemaria	6	6
(Spain) M. Martínez / (Spain) S. Saiz	2	2
(Portugal) A. Nogueira / (Spain) B. Caldera	6	6
(Spain) E. Amatriaín / (France) L. Godallier	1	1
(Italy) C. Casali / (Spain) R. Segura	6	6
(Spain) A. Soriano / (Spain) S. Bellver	2	4
(Spain) L. Sainz / (Spain) P. Llaguno	6	6	3
7	(Spain) Majo / (Spain) Mapi	7	4	6
8	(Argentina) C. Jensen / (Spain) V. Virseda	6	6
(Italy) E. Stellato / (Italy) G. Sussarello	0	2
(Spain) C. Fernandez / (Spain) V. Iglesias	6	6
(Spain) M. Barrera / (Spain) M. Villalba	0	1
(Russia) K. Sharifova / (Spain) M. Borrero	6	4
(Spain) A. Martinez / (Spain) S. Ruiz	7	6
(Sweden) C. Navarro / (Spain) M. Guinart	2	0
3	(Spain) B. González / (Argentina) D. Brea	6	6
4	(Spain) A. Salazar / (Portugal) S. Araújo	6	6
(Spain) A. Perez / (Spain) P. Martínez	1	3
(Italy) C. Orsi / (Spain) C. Mesa	6	6
(Spain) L. Manquillo / (Italy) L. Vano	1	1
(Spain) C. Goenaga / (Spain) L. Martínez	6	6
(Spain) C. Castillon / (Spain) N. Vivancos	2	3
(Spain) J. Velasco / (Spain) N. Canovas	6	4
5	(Spain) T. Icardo / (Argentina) V. Riera	7	6
6	(Argentina) A. Osoro / (Spain) J. Castelló	7	1	6
(Spain) N. Rodriguez / (Spain) M. Talaván	5	6	4
(Spain) E. Carnicero / (Spain) M. Merino	3	3
(Spain) A. Alonso / (Spain) A. Ustero	6	3
(Spain) A.F. de Osso / (Spain) L. Arruabarrena	4	2
(Spain) M. Caparros / (Spain) T. Navarro	6	6
(France) A. Collombon / (Spain) L. Rufo	3	3
2	(Spain) G. Triay / (Spain) M. Ortega	6	6

Round of 16
1	(Spain) A. Sánchez / (Spain) P. Josemaria	7	7
(Portugal) A. Nogueira / (Spain) B. Caldera	5	6
(Italy) C. Casali / (Spain) R. Segura	2	2
7	(Spain) Majo / (Spain) Mapi	6	6
8	(Argentina) C. Jensen / (Spain) V. Virseda	4	6	7
(Spain) C. Fernandez / (Spain) V. Iglesias	6	1	5
(Spain) A. Martinez / (Spain) S. Ruiz	6	3
3	(Spain) B. González / (Argentina) D. Brea	7	6
4	(Spain) A. Salazar / (Portugal) S. Araújo	6	7
(Italy) C. Orsi / (Spain) C. Mesa	2	5
(Spain) C. Goenaga / (Spain) L. Martínez	2	7	2
5	(Spain) T. Icardo / (Argentina) V. Riera	6	6	6
6	(Argentina) A. Osoro / (Spain) J. Castelló	2	6	5
(Spain) A. Alonso / (Spain) A. Ustero	6	4	7
(Spain) M. Caparros / (Spain) T. Navarro	1	6	0
2	(Spain) G. Triay / (Spain) M. Ortega	6	1	6

Quarter-Final
1	(Spain) A. Sánchez / (Spain) P. Josemaria	6	6
7	(Spain) Majo / (Spain) Mapi	0	2
(Argentina) C. Jensen / (Spain) V. Virseda	2	2
3	(Spain) B. González / (Argentina) D. Brea	6	6
4	(Spain) A. Salazar / (Portugal) S. Araújo	4	4
5	(Spain) T. Icardo / (Argentina) V. Riera	6	6
(Spain) A. Alonso / (Spain) A. Ustero	2	3
2	(Spain) G. Triay / (Spain) M. Ortega	6	6

Semi-Finals
1	(Spain) A. Sánchez / (Spain) P. Josemaría	6	6
3	(Spain) B. González / (Argentina) D. Brea	3	2
5	(Spain) T. Icardo / (Argentina) V. Riera	2	1
2	(Spain) G. Triay / (Spain) M. Ortega	6	6

Finals
1	(Spain) A. Sánchez / (Spain) P. Josemaría	6	7
2	(Spain) G. Triay / (Spain) M. Ortega	3	6

=== Round of 32 ===
Men's

Date	Winners	Score	Opponent	Refs.
20/9/2023	(Argentina) Agustín Tapia (Spain) Arturo Coello	6–4 / 6–1	(Spain) Alejandro Arroyo (Spain) Gonzalo Rubio	
20/9/2023	(Spain) Eduardo Alonso (Spain) Juanlu Esbri	6–7 / 6–2 / 6–2	(Spain) Juan Martín Díaz (Argentina) Miguel Lamperti	
20/9/2023	(Spain) Javier Leal (Spain) José García Diestro	6–1 / 6–4	(Argentina) Nicolás Suescun (Spain) Javier Martinez Vazquez	
20/9/2023	(Spain) Alex Ruiz (Argentina) Juan Tello	6–7 / 6–4 / 7–5	(Spain) Ignacio Vilariño (Spain) Salvador Oria	
20/9/2023	(Argentina) Fernando Belasteguín (Spain) Miguel Yanguas	6–4 / 6–3	(Spain) Pablo Cardona (Spain) Pincho Fernandez	
20/9/2023	(Argentina) Lucho Capra (Argentina) Maxi Sánchez	7–5 / 6–2	(Argentina) Alex Chozas (Spain) Alvaro Cepero	
20/9/2023	(Argentina) Agustín Gutiérrez (Argentina) Sanyo Gutiérrez	6–2 / W.O.	(Spain) Jorge Ruiz (Spain) Josete Rico	
20/9/2023	(Spain) Alejandro Galán (Spain) Juan Lebrón	6–3 / 6–3	(Argentina) Agustin Gomez Silingo (Brazil) Pablo Lima	
20/9/2023	(Argentina) Federico Chingotto (Spain) Paquito Navarro	6–3 / 6–2	(Spain) Francisco Gil (Argentina) Ramiro Moyano	
20/9/2023	(Brazil) Lucas Bergamini (Spain) Víctor Ruiz	6–0 / 6–1	(Spain) Javier García Mora (Spain) Javier Gonzalez Barahona	
20/9/2023	(Spain) Javi Rico (Spain) Rafael Méndez	6–2 / 6–2	(Spain) Arnau Ayats (Spain) Francisco Guerrero	
20/9/2023	(Spain) Javi Garrido (Spain) Momo González	6–4 / 6–4	(Spain) Iván Ramírez (Spain) Pablo García Rodrigo	
20/9/2023	(Spain) Coki Nieto (Spain) Jon Sanz	6–2 / 6–2	(Spain) Iñigo Jofre (Spain) Miguel González García	
20/9/2023	(Spain) Jairo Bautista (Spain) Jaime Muñoz	3–6 / 7–5 / 6–3	(Spain) Javi Ruiz (Argentina) Juan Cruz Belluati	
20/9/2023	(Spain) Mario del Castillo (Spain) Miguel Benítez	6–2 / 6–1	(Argentina) Leo Augsburger (Argentina) Valentino Libaak	
20/9/2023	(Argentina) Martin Di Nenno (Argentina) Franco Stupaczuk	6–0 / 6–2	(Spain) Adrian Marqués (Spain) Mario Huete	

Women's

Date	Winners	Score	Opponent	Refs.
20/9/2023	(Spain) Ariana Sánchez (Spain) Paula Josemaria	6–2 / 6–2	(Spain) Marina Martínez (Spain) Sofía Saiz	
20/9/2023	(Portugal) Ana Catarina Nogueira (Spain) Beatriz Caldera	6–1 / 6–1	(Spain) Eli Amatriaín (France) Lea Godallier	
20/9/2023	(Italy) Carlotta Casali (Spain) Raquel Segura	6–2 / 6–4	(Spain) Arantxa Soriano (Spain) Sandra Bellver	
20/9/2023	(Spain) Majo Sánchez Alayeto (Spain) Mapi Sánchez Alayeto	7–6 / 4–6 / 6–3	(Spain) Lucía Sainz (Spain) Patty Llaguno	
20/9/2023	(Argentina) Claudia Jensen (Spain) Verónica Virseda	6–0 / 6–2	(Italy) Emily Stellato (Italy) Giulia Sussarello	
20/9/2023	(Spain) Claudia Fernandez (Spain) Victoria Iglesias	6–0 / 6–1	(Spain) Marta Barrera (Spain) Mari Carmen Villalba	
20/9/2023	(Spain) Araceli Martinez (Spain) Sara Ruiz Soto	7–6 / 6–4	(Russia) Ksenia Sharifova (Spain) Marta Borrero	
20/9/2023	(Spain) Bea González (Argentina) Delfina Brea	6–2 / 6–0	(Sweden) Carolina Navarro (Spain) Marina Guinart	
20/9/2023	(Spain) Alejandra Salazar (Portugal) Sofia Araújo	6–1 / 6–3	(Spain) Agueda Perez (Spain) Patricia Martínez	
20/9/2023	(Italy) Carolina Orsi (Spain) Carla Mesa	6–1 / 6–1	(Spain) Letizia Manquillo (Italy) Lorena Vano	
20/9/2023	(Spain) Carmen Goenaga (Spain) Lucía Martínez	6–2 / 6–3	(Spain) Carmen Castillon (Spain) Nuria Vivancos	
20/9/2023	(Spain) Tamara Icardo (Argentina) Virginia Riera	7–6 / 6–4	(Spain) Jimena Velasco (Spain) Noa Canovas	
20/9/2023	(Argentina) Aranza Osoro (Spain) Jessica Castelló	7–5 / 1–6 / 6–4	(Spain) Nuria Rodriguez (Spain) Marta Talaván	
20/9/2023	(Spain) Alejandra Alonso (Spain) Andrea Ustero	6–3 / 6–3	(Spain) Esther Carnicero (Spain) Melania Merino Saez	
20/9/2023	(Spain) Marta Caparros (Spain) Teresa Navarro	6–4 / 6–2	(Spain) Ana Fernandez de Osso (Spain) Lara Arruabarrena	
20/9/2023	(Spain) Gemma Triay (Spain) Marta Ortega	6–3 / 6–3	(France) Alix Collombon (Spain) Lorena Rufo	

=== Round of 16 ===
Men's

Date	Team A	Score	Team B	Refs.
21/9/2023	(Argentina) Agustín Tapia (Spain) Arturo Coello	6–4 / 6–0	(Spain) Eduardo Alonso (Spain) Juanlu Esbri	
21/9/2023	(Spain) Javier Leal (Spain) José García Diestro	6–7 / 6–3 / 6–4	(Spain) Alex Ruiz (Argentina) Juan Tello	
21/9/2023	(Argentina) Lucho Capra (Argentina) Maxi Sánchez	6–3 / 6–2	(Argentina) Fernando Belasteguín (Spain) Miguel Yanguas	
21/9/2023	(Argentina) Agustín Gutiérrez (Argentina) Sanyo Gutiérrez	4–6 / 7–6 / 6–4	(Spain) Alejandro Galán (Spain) Juan Lebrón	
21/9/2023	(Argentina) Federico Chingotto (Spain) Paquito Navarro	6–2 / 4–6 / 6–3	(Brazil) Lucas Bergamini (Spain) Víctor Ruiz	
21/9/2023	(Spain) Javi Garrido (Spain) Momo González	W.O.	(Spain) Javi Rico (Spain) Rafael Méndez	
21/9/2023	(Spain) Coki Nieto (Spain) Jon Sanz	6–1 / 4–6 / 6–1	(Spain) Jairo Bautista (Spain) Jaime Muñoz	
21/9/2023	(Argentina) Martin Di Nenno (Argentina) Franco Stupaczuk	6–1 / 6–1	(Spain) Mario del Castillo (Spain) Miguel Benítez	

Women's

Date	Team A	Score	Team B	Refs.
21/9/2023	(Spain) Ariana Sánchez (Spain) Paula Josemaria	7–5 / 7–6	(Portugal) Ana Catarina Nogueira (Spain) Beatriz Caldera	
21/9/2023	(Spain) Majo Sánchez Alayeto (Spain) Mapi Sánchez Alayeto	6–2 / 6–2	(Italy) Carlotta Casali (Spain) Raquel Segura	
21/9/2023	(Argentina) Claudia Jensen (Spain) Verónica Virseda	4–6 / 6–1 / 7–5	(Spain) Claudia Fernandez (Spain) Victoria Iglesias	
21/9/2023	(Spain) Bea González (Argentina) Delfina Brea	7–6 / 6–3	(Spain) Araceli Martinez (Spain) Sara Ruiz Soto	
21/9/2023	(Spain) Alejandra Salazar (Portugal) Sofia Araújo	6–2 / 7–5	(Italy) Carolina Orsi (Spain) Carla Mesa	
21/9/2023	(Spain) Tamara Icardo (Argentina) Virginia Riera	6–2 / 6–7 / 6–2	(Spain) Carmen Goenaga (Spain) Lucía Martínez	
21/9/2023	(Spain) Alejandra Alonso (Spain) Andrea Ustero	6–2 / 4–6 / 7–5	(Argentina) Aranza Osoro (Spain) Jessica Castelló	
21/9/2023	(Spain) Gemma Triay (Spain) Marta Ortega	6–1 / 1–6 / 6–0	(Spain) Marta Caparros (Spain) Teresa Navarro	

=== Quarter-Finals ===
Men's

Date	Team A	Score	Team B	Refs.
22/9/2023	(Argentina) Agustín Tapia (Spain) Arturo Coello	4–6 / 7–5 / 6–4	(Spain) Javier Leal (Spain) José García Diestro	
22/9/2023	(Argentina) Agustín Gutiérrez (Argentina) Sanyo Gutiérrez	6–3 / 1–6 / 7–6	(Argentina) Lucho Capra (Argentina) Maxi Sánchez	
22/9/2023	(Argentina) Federico Chingotto (Spain) Paquito Navarro	6–4 / 6–0	(Spain) Javi Garrido (Spain) Momo González	
22/9/2023	(Argentina) Martin Di Nenno (Argentina) Franco Stupaczuk	3–6 / 6–1 / 6–4	(Spain) Coki Nieto (Spain) Jon Sanz	

Women's

Date	Team A	Score	Team B	Refs.
22/9/2023	(Spain) Ariana Sánchez (Spain) Paula Josemaria	6–0 / 6–2	(Spain) Majo Sánchez Alayeto (Spain) Mapi Sánchez Alayeto	
22/9/2023	(Spain) Bea González (Argentina) Delfina Brea	6–2 / 6–2	(Argentina) Claudia Jensen (Spain) Verónica Virseda	
22/9/2023	(Spain) Tamara Icardo (Argentina) Virginia Riera	6–4 / 6–4	(Spain) Alejandra Salazar (Portugal) Sofia Araújo	
22/9/2023	(Spain) Gemma Triay (Spain) Marta Ortega	6–2 / 6–3	(Spain) Alejandra Alonso (Spain) Andrea Ustero	

=== Semi-Finals ===
Men's

Date	Team A	Score	Team B	Refs.
23/9/2023	(Argentina) Agustín Tapia (Spain) Arturo Coello	6–1 / 6–0	(Argentina) Agustín Gutiérrez (Argentina) Sanyo Gutiérrez	
23/9/2023	(Argentina) Martin Di Nenno (Argentina) Franco Stupaczuk	5–7 / 7–6 / 6–0	(Argentina) Federico Chingotto (Spain) Paquito Navarro	

Women's

Date	Team A	Score	Team B	Refs.
23/9/2023	(Spain) Ariana Sánchez (Spain) Paula Josemaría	6–3 / 6–2	(Spain) Bea González (Argentina) Delfina Brea	
23/9/2023	(Spain) Gemma Triay (Spain) Marta Ortega	6–2 / 6–1	(Spain) Tamara Icardo (Argentina) Virginia Riera	

=== Finals ===
Men's

Date	Team A	Score	Team B	Refs.
24/9/2023	(Argentina) Martin Di Nenno (Argentina) Franco Stupaczuk	7–5 / 6–4	(Argentina) Agustín Tapia (Spain) Arturo Coello	

Women's

Date	Team A	Score	Team B	Refs.
24/9/2023	(Spain) Ariana Sánchez (Spain) Paula Josemaría	6–3 / 7–6	(Spain) Gemma Triay (Spain) Marta Ortega	
