= Agustín Tapia =

Argentine padel player (born 1999)

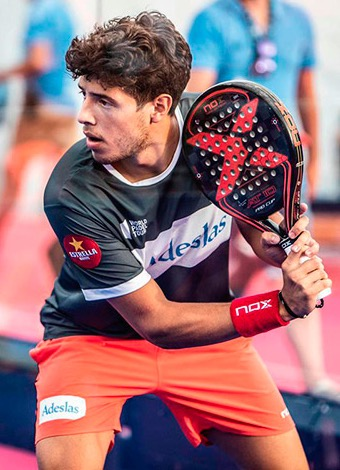

Personal information
- Full name: Darío Agustín Tapia Nievas
- Nicknames: El Mozart de Catamarca; El Pollito
- Born: July 24, 1999 (age 27) San Fernando del Valle de Catamarca, Argentina
- Height: 1.79 m (5 ft 10 1/2 in)

Sport
- Country: Argentina
- Sport: Padel
- Position: Revés (left-side)
- Rank: 1st (Premier Padel)
- Turned pro: 2018
- Partner: Arturo Coello

Achievements and titles
- World finals: 2022, 2024
- Highest world ranking: 1st (2023, 2024, 2025, 2026)
- Updated on 31 October 2026

Darío Agustín Tapia Nievas (born 24 July 1999), known as Agustín Tapia, is an Argentine professional padel player. He currently holds the number 1 position in the FIP ranking, is right-handed, and plays on the backhand side alongside Arturo Coello. Together, they form the current number one ranked padel pair in Premier Padel.

Despite his young age, he has played with some of the best players in history, such as Juan Martín Díaz, Fernando Belasteguín, and Pablo Lima, eventually becoming world number 1 by winning the 2023 Vigo Open with Coello. They repeated the feat in the 2024, 2025 and 2026 Premier Padel editions, padel main circuit.

He is known in the world of padel as "El Mozart de Catamarca" (The Mozart of Catamarca), and he is currently the active player with the most tournament wins.

== Padel Career ==
Agustín Tapia began his career on the World Padel Tour in 2018, starting with Marcello Jardim as his partner. At the Catalunya Master, held in March of that year, he already began to stand out, reaching the quarterfinals.

=== Partnership with Juan Martín Díaz ===
==== 2019 ====
In 2019, Tapia became the new partner of 14-time world number one Juan Martín Díaz. In their first tournament together, they were eliminated in the Round of 16 by three-time world number ones and future partners of Tapia, Fernando Belasteguín & Pablo Lima. However, they would play only three more tournaments together due to an injury Díaz sustained at the Buenos Aires Master, with Tapia playing the subsequent three tournaments alongside different temporary partners.

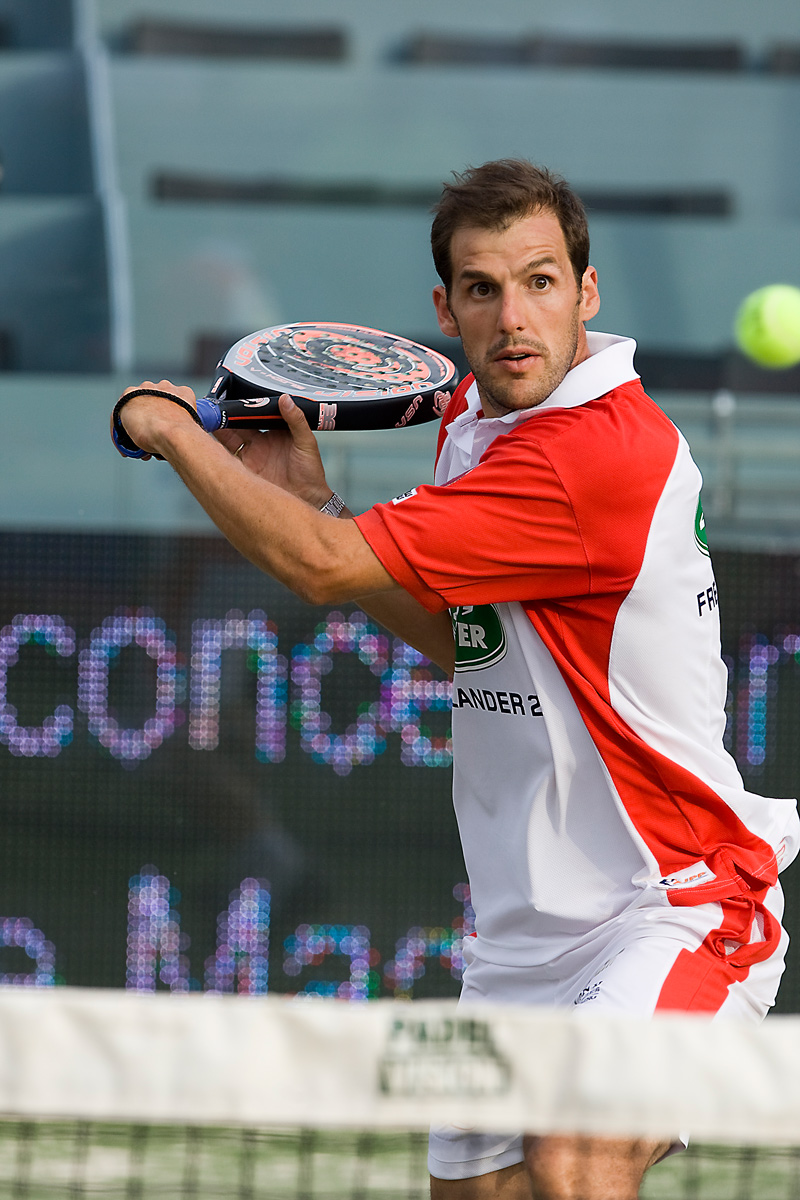
Juan Martín Díaz, who partnered Tapia in the first half of 2019.

=== Partnership with Fernando Belasteguín ===
Midway through the season, after months of speculation, Fernando Belasteguín became his new sporting partner. The partnership had one of the largest age differences in the circuit, with a 20 years difference between the two players. They debuted in the Mijas Open, exiting in the round of 16, however in their second tournament together, the Madrid Master, they defeated all the top teams on their road to the title, beating the No. 2 ranked team Juan Lebrón & Paquito Navarro in the round of 16, and the No. 1 rankeds Maxi Sánchez & Sanyo Gutiérrez in the final, with Tapia claiming its first professional title, at only 20 years of age.

They would also reach the next four tournaments semifinals, but were unable to progress in any of them. At the Mexico Open, the last tournament before the year-ending Master Final, they were unexpectedly eliminated in the round of 16. At the Master Finals, they defeated the newly crowned No. 1 ranked team, Lebrón & Paquito, in the semifinals, but lost in the final against Alejandro Galán & Lima, ending the season ranked fourth as a pair.

=== 2020 ===
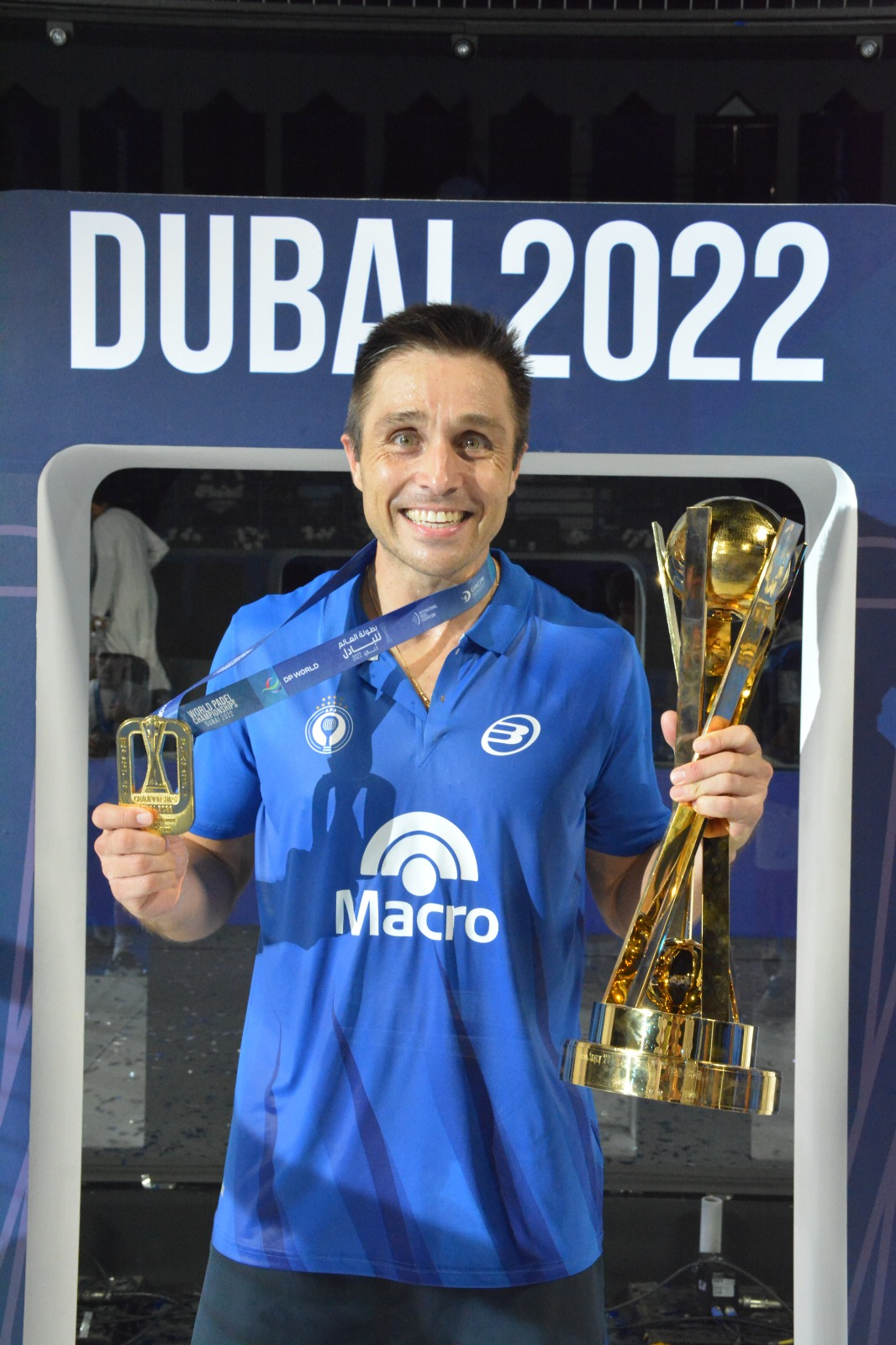
Fernando Belasteguín, who partnered Tapia for two seasons.

Belasteguín and Tapia continued together in 2020, starting as the No. 5 ranked pair due to other players changing partner, and forming new teams. The season was heavily affected by the COVID-19 pandemic and only had 11 tournaments. They began the new season, losing in the quarter-finals of the Marbella Master, shortly before the circuit was suspended. After a three-month hiatus, they returned to competition in the Estrella Damm Open, again losing in the quarterfinals. In the third tournament of the season, also in Madrid, the Argentine duo reached the final, but lost to the No. 1 ranked team, Galán & Lebrón.

After two quarter-final exits in the following two Open's, in the sixth tournament of the season, and the only international tournament of the year, the Sardinia Open , Belasteguín and Tapia won their second title together, defeating Javier Ruiz & Uri Botello in the final. In next four tournaments, they reached one more the final, in the Menorca Open, but were once again defeated by Franco Stupaczuk & Sanyo Gutiérrez.

They entered the Master Final as the No. 3 ranked team. Before their quarter-final match, Belasteguín and Tapia announced in an emotional video that the tournament would be their last together. They went on to defeat Gutiérrez & Stupaczuk in the semifinals and then overcame the No. 1 rankeds Galán & Lebrón, 6–3, 7–6 in the final, which concluded with a 24-point tie-break. With the win, Belasteguín became the oldest Master Final champion, with 41 years, while Tapia became the youngest, at 21 years. They finished the season ranked second as a pair, with both ranked third individually.

=== Partnership with Pablo Lima ===
==== 2021 ====
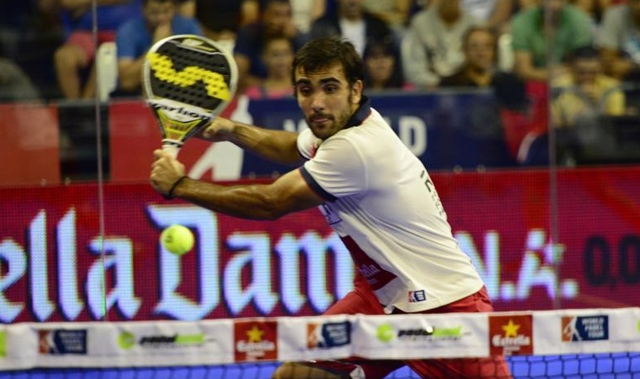
Pablo Lima, who partnered Tapia for most of the 2021 season.

In 2021, Tapia teamed up with three-time world number one Pablo Lima. They reached the semifinals in their first tournament together but failed to repeat the feat in the following event, suffering a surprise quarterfinal exit at the hands of Arturo Coello & Miguel Lamperti. After a semifinal appearance and an early exit in the round of 16 in the next two tournaments, Lima and Tapia reached their first final in the fifth tournament of the year, the Marbella Master, where they were defeated by the world number ones, Galán & Lebrón.

After two early exits in subsequent tournaments, the Argentine-Brazilian duo reached their second final at the Las Rozas Open, having defeated Galán & Lebrón in the semifinals, where they beat the second-ranked pair, Fernando Belasteguín & Sanyo Gutiérrez, to claim their first trophy of 2021. They went on to win another title at the following tournament, the Malaga Open, by defeating Martín Di Nenno & Paquito Navarro. However, the results following the summer break were not as positive, reaching only one semifinal across four tournaments, leading Tapia to decide to end his partnership with Lima.

=== Partnership with Sanyo Gutiérrez ===
A few days later it was confirmed that Sanyo Gutiérrez would be his new partner for the remainder of the season. Together they won a tournament before the end of the year, the Swedish Open, after defeating the number 2 seeds, Martín Di Nenno & Paquito Navarro, in the final by 7–5 and 6–0.

==== 2022 ====
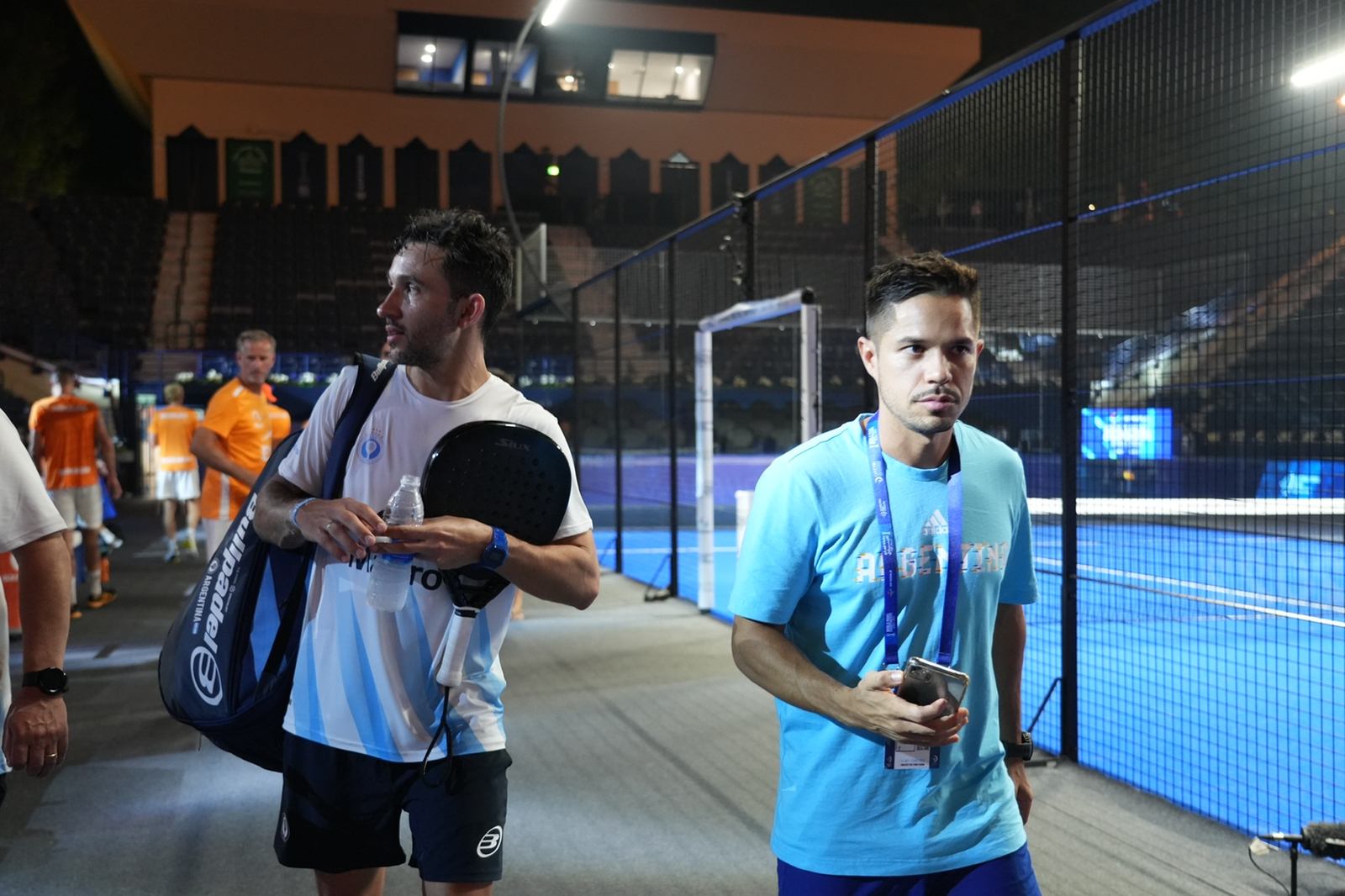
Sanyo Gutiérrez, who Tapia played with in the late part of 2021 and fought for the world number 1 spot in 2022.

In 2022, Tapia continued playing alongside Sanyo throughout the year. The pair began the season being eliminated in the Miami Open semifinals but bounced back to win the Reus Open, defeating Galán & Lebrón in the finals. However, the world number ones avenged the loss by eliminating them in the semifinals of the Vigo, Alicante, and Brussels Open's.

Next came a victory at the Danish Open, followed by a semifinal loss to the top-ranked pair in Marbella, a defeat they avenged in the Vienna Open final. At the French Open, they lost again in the semifinals to Galán & Lebrón, as well as in the Valladolid Master semifinals to Arturo Coello & Belasteguin. However, they headed into the summer break with wins in Valencia (against the world number ones) and Málaga, and a 3–5 record against their main rivals, allowing them to rise to the number two spot and significantly close the gap on the top-ranked pair in the rankings.

Nevertheless, they were unable to maintain their level of play during the final months of the competition, advancing past the quarterfinals in only two of the last nine World Padel Tour tournaments of the year. Even so, they finished as the number two ranked pair, with over 10,000 points each, and officially announced their split following the Master Final.

In 2022, Tapia also made his debut on the new Premier Padel circuit. His best performance came at the Mexico Major, where he reached the final alongside Sanyo but lost in three sets to Belasteguín & Coello.

=== Partnership with Arturo Coello ===
==== 2023 ====
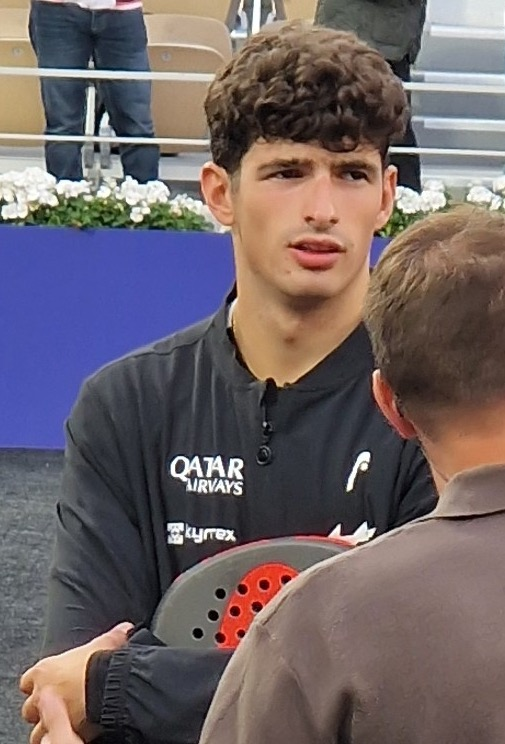
Arturo Coello, who has partnered Tapia for the last four season, finishing as the number one ranked in three of them.

In 2023, Tapia joined forces with Arturo Coello with the goal of dethroning Galán and Lebrón to claim the number one ranking spot. They started the year in the best possible way, defeating the world numbers ones in two sets at the finals of the Abu Dhabi Master, demonstrating their ability to challenge for the number one ranking that year. Next, they were eliminated by Franco Stupaczuk & Martín Di Nenno, who would be their main rival during the season, in the semifinals of Premier Padel's Qatar Major but reacted in the best possible way, winning the La Rioja Open in Argentina, beating the young pair of Augsburguer & Libaak in the final, and mantaining their invincibility in WPT. They continued their strong run, at the next World Padel Tour event, the Chile Open, winning their third title of the year, after defeating Galán & Lebrón in a 3-sets final, in a match marred by controversial refereeing decisions in the second set. In the next three tournaments, the Paraguay, Granada and Brussels Open's, they faced Franco Stupaczuk & Martín Di Nenno in the finals, winning the three and closing the gap to the first ranking spot.

On 14th May, Coello and Tapia faced Alejandro Galán & Juan Lebrón in the Vigo Open final, winning 6–3 / 6–7 / 7–6, claiming their seventh title of the year, becoming the number one ranked team in the circuit and at 21 years, 2 months and 21 days, Coello became the youngest player in history to reach number 1. They missed the following tournament but upon returning won the Vienna Open, beating once again Di Nenno & Stupaczuk, and the Marbella Master clinching their nine consecutive WPT title of the season. After missing the French Open due to physical issues, the new world number ones reached the finals of the Valladolid Master, where they lost their first WPT match of the season to Franco Stupaczuk & Martín Di Nenno, thereby ending a 46 match winning streak. At the following tournament in Valencia, Coello and Tapia suffered their first pre-final defeat, being eliminated in the semifinals by Galán & Jon Sanz, but went on to win the last WPT tournament before the summer break in Málaga, heading into the summer break with ten out of a possible fourteen World Padel Tour titles.

During the break, they played three Premier Padel tournaments, the Italy Major and the Madrid and Mendoza P1s, winning all of them. The return to WPT events began with a surprising Round of 16 loss at the Finland Open against Lucas Bergamini and Victor Ruiz, but was followed by a fourth Premier Padel trophy of the season: the Paris Major, played at Stade Roland Garros. The worst stretch of the season for both came in the following five tournaments, where they managed to reach only two finals, losing in Madrid Master to Di Nenno & Stupaczuk, and in Menorca Open to Galán and a returning Lebrón.

However, by winning the Mexico Open, the penultimate tournament on the WPT calendar, Coello and Tapia mathematically secured the year-end number one spot in the WPT rankings. In the final two events of the year, the Premier Padel Milan P1 and the Master Finals, which marked the last-ever tournament in World Padel Tour history, they would only reach the semifinals in both; nevertheless, the combined results from WPT and Premier tournaments allowed Coello and Tapia to claim 15 titles out of 28 events played, setting a record for the most titles won in a single season.

==== 2024 ====
In 2024, following the conflict between WPT and Premier Padel/FIP, which led the FIP to disregard 2023 World Padel Tour tournaments for ranking purposes, and with Premier Padel now established as the premier circuit, Coello and Tapia began the year as the world's number two pair, despite having finished the previous year in the top spot. In the first tournament of the season, the Riyadh P1, they would reach the finals where they faced and lost to Galán & Lebrón in three sets.

They recovered winning the Qatar Major dropping only two games in the final, winning the Acapulco P1 after beating Galán & Lebrón in their last match together at the finals, and defeating Federico Chingotto & Galán to win the Puerto Cabello P2. In the next two tournaments, they would lose twice to Chingotto & Galán, first in the Brussels final and then in the semifinals of the Seville P2, which would turn out to be the only tournament of the season where they failed to reach the final. In the six remaining tournaments leading up to the summer break, Coello and Tapia faced 'ChinGalán' in every final; they won the Asunción P2 and the Santiago and Málaga P1s, but lost the Mar del Plata P1, the Genoa P2, and the Italy Major, heading into the break with a 4–5 head-to-head record (4–4 in finals) against their rivals.

Coello and Tapia returned from the summer break unstoppable, facing Chingotto & Galán four times in the span of a month and defeating them on every occasion to win the Madrid and Rotterdam P1s, the Valladolid P2, and the Paris Major, thus reaching their 25th title in just 46 tournaments played and 33 finals contested. After not competing in the season's nineteenth tournament in Egypt, they reached four more finals during the second half of November and the first half of December, winning all of them to claim the Dubai, Kuwait, and Milan P1's, as well as the Mexico Major. By winning the tournament in Mexico, they mathematically secured finishing the season as the world number ones in the ranking, and with their victory in Milan, they claimed their ninth consecutive title and extended their winning streak to 45 straight matches.

Thus, the 'Golden Boys' headed into the Premier Padel Finals having won 14 of the 20 Premier Padel circuit tournaments they had entered, reaching every final except the one in Seville, and closing the regular season with a record of 93 wins in 99 matches. They reached the final of the season's last event but were surprisingly defeated in three sets by Coki Nieto & Jon Sanz.

==== 2025 ====
2025 began just like the previous year, with Coello and Tapia reaching the finals of the season's opening tournament in Riyadh, this time against the world's number 3 pair, Franco Stupaczuk and Juan Lebrón, and winning in three sets. They did not compete in the Gijón and Cancún P2 events, along with other top-100 players, due to disputes between Premier Padel and the Professional Padel Players Association. They returned at the Miami P1, where they were eliminated in the semifinals by Lebrón & Stupaczuk, failing to reach a final for the first time in nearly a year (324 days). At the subsequent tournament in Santiago, they not only suffered their earliest elimination in Premier Padel events but also missed out on the final in two consecutive tournaments (among those they played) for the first time.

They stepped up their game by defeating Chingotto & Galán in the season's first 'SuperClásico' to win the Qatar Major, and repeated the feat a week later to claim the Brussels P2, extending their head-to-head record against 'ChinGalán' to 12–5 and reaching a 296-day unbeaten streak against their rivals. However, at the season's eighth tournament in Asunción, they suffered a shock quarter-final exit at the hands of the 16th-ranked pair, Juanlu Esbri & Salvador Oria. After the unexpected defeat in Asunción, they embarked on a run lasting over a year in which they reached every final, starting with the Buenos Aires P1, where they defeated Lucas Bergamini & Paquito Navarro, followed by the Italy Major, where they were beaten by Galán & Chingotto, ending a 343-day unbeaten streak against their rivals. In the four tournaments leading up to the summer break, they defeated Lebrón & Stupaczuk to win the Valladolid P2, securing their 34th title and surpassing the Galán & Lebrón pairing in trophies won, and beat 'ChinGalán' at the Bordeaux P2 and the Málaga and Tarragona P1s, reaching a total of 37 titles and becoming the second most successful pair of all time by overtaking Fernando Belasteguín & Pablo Lima (who had 36).

In the first tournament after the break, the Madrid P1, they reached the final but were defeated by Leandro Augsburger and Martín Di Nenno, who beat all the top-3 pairs on their way to the title. In the following four tournaments both Coello–Tapia and Chingotto–Galán reached the finals with the 'Golden Boys' winning the Paris Major and the Rotterdam P1 (their 40th title as a pair), and 'ChinGalán' winning the Germany P2 and the Milan P1. After not competing in the NewGiza P2, they wrapped up the season by competing in four more tournaments and facing 'ChinGalán' in every final. Although they were defeated by them in the FIP Pairs World Cup finals, they finished the regular season by winning the Dubai P1 and the Mexico Major, mathematically securing the world number 1 ranking for the third consecutive year. With the win in Mexico, Coello and Tapia also became the third most successful pair in history, reaching 54 finals across 66 tournaments, making the finals 81.8% of the time (winning 41 of the 54 finals played, a 75.9% success rate), and amassing a total of 41 titles. Their last encounter of the season took place in the Premier Padel Finals, where they won the season-ending tournament in three sets and extended their head-to-head record against their rivals to 20–9.

== Honours ==
=== World Padel Tour (2019–2023) ===
Winner Runner-up

==== Finals ====
N.º	Date	Tournament	Partner	Result	Opponents in the final	Career title No.
1.	8 September 2019	(Spain) Madrid Master	(Argentina) Fernando Belasteguín	6–4 / 6–4	(Argentina) Maxi Sánchez (Argentina) Sanyo Gutiérrez	1st
2.	22 December 2019	(Spain) Master Final	(Argentina) Fernando Belasteguín	6–7 / 3–6	(Spain) Alejandro Galán (Brazil) Pablo Lima	
3.	19 July 2020	(Spain) Vuelve a Madrid Open	(Argentina) Fernando Belasteguín	6–4 / 1–6 / 4–6	(Spain) Alejandro Galán (Spain) Juan Lebrón	
4.	13 September 2020	(Italy) Sardegna Open	(Argentina) Fernando Belasteguín	6–1 / 6–4	(Spain) Javier Ruiz (Spain) Uri Botello	2nd
5.	27 September 2020	(Spain) Menorca Open	(Argentina) Fernando Belasteguín	3–6 / 5–7	(Argentina) Franco Stupaczuk (Argentina) Sanyo Gutiérrez	
6.	13 December 2020	(Spain) Master Final	(Argentina) Fernando Belasteguín	6–3 / 7–6	(Spain) Alejandro Galán (Spain) Juan Lebrón	3rd
7.	13 June 2021	(Spain) Marbella Master	(Brazil) Pablo Lima	6–7 / 2–6	(Spain) Alejandro Galán (Spain) Juan Lebrón	
8.	11 July 2021	(Spain) Las Rozas Open	(Brazil) Pablo Lima	6–1 / 6–4	(Argentina) Fernando Belasteguín (Argentina) Sanyo Gutiérrez	4th
9.	8 August 2021	(Spain) Málaga Open	(Brazil) Pablo Lima	6–2 / 7–6	(Argentina) Martín Di Nenno (Spain) Paquito Navarro	5th
10.	14 November 2021	(Sweden) Swedish Open	(Argentina) Sanyo Gutiérrez	7–5 / 6–0	(Argentina) Martín Di Nenno (Spain) Paquito Navarro	6th
11.	28 November 2021	(Argentina) Buenos Aires	(Argentina) Sanyo Gutiérrez	4–6 / 2–6	(Argentina) Martín Di Nenno (Spain) Paquito Navarro	
12.	19 December 2021	(Spain) Master Final	(Argentina) Sanyo Gutiérrez	4–6 / 4–6	(Spain) Alejandro Galán (Spain) Juan Lebrón	
13.	13 March 2022	(Spain) Reus Open	(Argentina) Sanyo Gutiérrez	6–2 / 6–2	(Spain) Alejandro Galán (Spain) Juan Lebrón	7th
14.	22 May 2022	(Denmark) Danish Open	(Argentina) Sanyo Gutiérrez	5–7 / 7–5 / 6–0	(Argentina) Lucho Capra (Argentina) Maxi Sánchez	8th
15.	12 June 2022	(Austria) Vienna Open	(Argentina) Sanyo Gutiérrez	6–1 / 0–6 / 7–6	(Spain) Alejandro Galán (Spain) Juan Lebrón	9th
16.	10 July 2022	(Spain) Valencia Open	(Argentina) Sanyo Gutiérrez	2–6 / 7–5 / 6–4	(Spain) Alejandro Galán (Spain) Juan Lebrón	10th
17.	24 July 2022	(Spain) Málaga Open	(Argentina) Sanyo Gutiérrez	7–6 / 6–4	(Argentina) Franco Stupaczuk (Brazil) Pablo Lima	11th
18	11 September 2022	Portugal Open	(Argentina) Sanyo Gutiérrez	2–6 / 7–6 / 1–6	(Spain) Alejandro Galán (Spain) Juan Lebrón	
19	13 November 2022	(Sweden) Swedish Open	(Argentina) Sanyo Gutiérrez	6–4 / 1–6 / 2–6	(Spain) Alejandro Galán (Spain) Juan Lebrón	
20	26 February 2023	(United Arab Emirates) Abu Dhabi Master	(Spain) Arturo Coello	7–6 / 6–3	(Spain) Alejandro Galán (Spain) Juan Lebrón	12th
21	12 March 2023	(Argentina) La Rioja Open	(Spain) Arturo Coello	6–1 / 6–0	(Argentina) Leandro Augsburger (Argentina) Valentino Libaak	13th
22	19 March 2023	Chile Open	(Spain) Arturo Coello	6–4 / 6–7 / 7–5	(Spain) Alejandro Galán (Spain) Juan Lebrón	14th
23	26 March 2023	Paraguay Open	(Spain) Arturo Coello	6–2 / 6–1	(Argentina) Franco Stupaczuk (Argentina) Martín Di Nenno	15th
24	16 April 2023	(Spain) Granada Open	(Spain) Arturo Coello	6–4 / 7–5	(Argentina) Franco Stupaczuk (Argentina) Martín Di Nenno	16th
25	30 April 2023	(Belgium) Brussels Open	(Spain) Arturo Coello	7–6 / 3–6 / 6–3	(Argentina) Franco Stupaczuk (Argentina) Martín Di Nenno	17th
26	14 May 2023	(Spain) Vigo Open	(Spain) Arturo Coello	6–3 / 6–7 / 7–6	(Spain) Alejandro Galán (Spain) Juan Lebrón	18th
27	28 May 2023	(Austria) Vienna Open	(Spain) Arturo Coello	6–3 / 6–3	(Argentina) Franco Stupaczuk (Argentina) Martín Di Nenno	19th
28	4 June 2023	(Spain) Marbella Master	(Spain) Arturo Coello	6–3 / 6–2	(Spain) Momo González (Argentina) Sanyo Gutiérrez	20th
29	25 June 2023	(Spain) Valladolid Master	(Spain) Arturo Coello	6–4 / 4–6 / 6–7	(Argentina) Franco Stupaczuk (Argentina) Martín Di Nenno	
30	30 July 2023	(Spain) Málaga Open	(Spain) Arturo Coello	7–5 / 7–6	(Spain) Aléx Ruiz (Argentina) Juan Tello	21st
31	24 September 2023	(Spain) Madrid Master	(Spain) Arturo Coello	5–7 / 4–6	(Argentina) Franco Stupaczuk (Argentina) Martín Di Nenno	
32	29 October 2023	(Spain) Menorca Open	(Spain) Arturo Coello	3–6 / 2–6	(Spain) Alejandro Galán (Spain) Juan Lebrón	
33	26 November 2023	Mexico Open	(Spain) Arturo Coello	6–4 / 6–2	(Argentina) Leandro Augsburger (Argentina) Valentino Libaak	22nd

Tournaments won	Challenger	Open	Master	Master Final	Total
Tournaments won	0	18	3	1	22

=== Premier Padel ===
Winner Runner-up

==== Finals ====
N.º	Date	Tournament	Partner	Result	Opponents in the final	Career title No.
34.	4 December 2022	Mexico Major	(Argentina) Sanyo Gutiérrez	3–6 / 6–3 / 3–6	(Spain) Arturo Coello (Argentina) Fernando Belasteguín	
35.	16 July 2023	Italy Major	(Spain) Arturo Coello	7–5 / 7–6	(Argentina) Federico Chingotto (Spain) Paquito Navarro	23rd
36.	23 July 2023	(Spain) Madrid P1	(Spain) Arturo Coello	7–5 / 6–2	(Argentina) Federico Chingotto (Spain) Paquito Navarro	24th
37.	6 August 2023	(Argentina) Mendoza P1	(Spain) Arturo Coello	6–2 / 7–6	(Argentina) Franco Stupaczuk (Argentina) Martín Di Nenno	25th
38.	10 September 2023	(France) Paris Major	(Spain) Arturo Coello	7–6 / 6–1	(Argentina) Federico Chingotto (Spain) Paquito Navarro	26th
39.	2 March 2024	(Saudi Arabia) Riyadh P1	(Spain) Arturo Coello	7–6 / 4–6 / 4–6	(Spain) Alejandro Galán (Spain) Juan Lebrón	
40.	8 March 2024	Qatar Major	(Spain) Arturo Coello	6–0 / 6–2	(Spain) Javi Garrido (Spain) Mike Yanguas	27th
41.	24 March 2024	(Mexico) Acapulco P1	(Spain) Arturo Coello	6–0 / 6–4	(Spain) Alejandro Galán (Spain) Juan Lebrón	28th
42.	31 March 2024	(Venezuela) Puerto Cabello P2	(Spain) Arturo Coello	2–6 / 6–3 / 6–3	(Spain) Alejandro Galán (Argentina) Federico Chingotto	29th
43.	28 April 2024	(Belgium) Brussels P2	(Spain) Arturo Coello	4–6 / 7–6 / 2–6	(Spain) Alejandro Galán (Argentina) Federico Chingotto	
44.	19 May 2024	(Paraguay) Asunción P2	(Spain) Arturo Coello	6–1 / 3–6 / 7–6	(Spain) Alejandro Galán (Argentina) Federico Chingotto	30th
45.	26 May 2024	(Argentina) Mar del Plata P1	(Spain) Arturo Coello	6–2 / 2–6 / 2–6	(Spain) Alejandro Galán (Argentina) Federico Chingotto	
46.	3 June 2024	(Chile) Santiago P1	(Spain) Arturo Coello	6–0 / 4–6 / 6–4	(Spain) Alejandro Galán (Argentina) Federico Chingotto	31st
47.	23 June 2024	Italy Major	(Spain) Arturo Coello	4–6 / 6–1 / 1–6	(Spain) Alejandro Galán (Argentina) Federico Chingotto	
48.	7 July 2024	(Italy) Genoa P2	(Spain) Arturo Coello	1–6 / 1–6	(Spain) Alejandro Galán (Argentina) Federico Chingotto	
49.	14 July 2024	(Spain) Málaga P1	(Spain) Arturo Coello	6–2 / 6–3	(Spain) Alejandro Galán (Argentina) Federico Chingotto	32nd
50.	8 September 2024	(Spain) Madrid P1	(Spain) Arturo Coello	6–3 / 7–6	(Spain) Alejandro Galán (Argentina) Federico Chingotto	33rd
51.	15 September 2024	(Netherlands) Rotterdam P1	(Spain) Arturo Coello	6–2 / 6–2	(Spain) Alejandro Galán (Argentina) Federico Chingotto	34th
52.	22 September 2024	(Spain) Valladolid P2	(Spain) Arturo Coello	6–4 / 4–6 / 6–3	(Spain) Alejandro Galán (Argentina) Federico Chingotto	35th
53.	6 October 2024	(France) Paris Major	(Spain) Arturo Coello	6–2 / 6–1	(Spain) Alejandro Galán (Argentina) Federico Chingotto	36th
54.	10 November 2024	(United Arab Emirates) Dubai P1	(Spain) Arturo Coello	6–4 / 6–3	(Spain) Alejandro Galán (Argentina) Federico Chingotto	37th
55.	17 November 2024	Kuwait P1	(Spain) Arturo Coello	6–4 / 6–2	(Argentina) Franco Stupaczuk (Spain) Mike Yanguas	38th
56.	1 December 2024	Mexico Major	(Spain) Arturo Coello	4–6 / 6–1 / 6–2	(Argentina) Franco Stupaczuk (Spain) Mike Yanguas	39th
57.	8 December 2024	(Italy) Milan P1	(Spain) Arturo Coello	6–4 / 7–5	(Spain) Alejandro Galán (Argentina) Federico Chingotto	40th
58.	22 December 2024	(Spain) Premier Padel Finals	(Spain) Arturo Coello	6–3 / 5–7 / 3–6	(Spain) Coki Nieto (Spain) Jon Sanz	
59.	15 February 2025	(Saudi Arabia) Riyadh P1	(Spain) Arturo Coello	6–3 / 5–7 / 6–3	(Argentina) Franco Stupaczuk (Spain) Juan Lebrón	41st
60.	19 April 2025	Qatar Major	(Spain) Arturo Coello	7–6 / 6–2	(Spain) Alejandro Galán (Argentina) Federico Chingotto	42nd
61.	27 April 2025	(Belgium) Brussels P2	(Spain) Arturo Coello	2–6 / 6–4 / 6–1	(Spain) Alejandro Galán (Argentina) Federico Chingotto	43rd
62.	1 June 2025	(Argentina) Buenos Aires P1	(Spain) Arturo Coello	6–2 / 6–2	(Brazil) Lucas Bergamini (Spain) Paquito Navarro	44th
63.	15 June 2025	Italy Major	(Spain) Arturo Coello	3–6 / 5–7	(Spain) Alejandro Galán (Argentina) Federico Chingotto	
64.	29 June 2025	(Spain) Valladolid P2	(Spain) Arturo Coello	7–5 / 6–4	(Argentina) Franco Stupaczuk (Spain) Juan Lebrón	45th
65.	6 July 2025	(France) Bordeaux P2	(Spain) Arturo Coello	7–6 / 6–4	(Spain) Alejandro Galán (Argentina) Federico Chingotto	46th
66.	20 July 2025	(Spain) Málaga P1	(Spain) Arturo Coello	6–4 / 7–5	(Spain) Alejandro Galán (Argentina) Federico Chingotto	47th
67.	3 August 2025	(Spain) Tarragona P1	(Spain) Arturo Coello	7–6 / 7–5	(Spain) Alejandro Galán (Argentina) Federico Chingotto	48th
68.	7 September 2025	(Spain) Madrid P1	(Spain) Arturo Coello	6–4 / 3–6 / 4–6	(Argentina) Leandro Augsburger (Argentina) Martín Di Nenno	
69.	14 September 2025	(France) Paris Major	(Spain) Arturo Coello	6–1 / 6–4	(Spain) Alejandro Galán (Argentina) Federico Chingotto	49th
70.	28 September 2025	Germany P2	(Spain) Arturo Coello	6–7 / 2–6	(Spain) Alejandro Galán (Argentina) Federico Chingotto	
71.	5 October 2025	(Netherlands) Rotterdam P1	(Spain) Arturo Coello	6–3 / 7–6	(Spain) Alejandro Galán (Argentina) Federico Chingotto	50th
72.	12 October 2025	(Italy) Milan P1	(Spain) Arturo Coello	6–2 / 3–6 / 0–6	(Spain) Alejandro Galán (Argentina) Federico Chingotto	
73.	9 November 2025	(Kuwait) FIP Pairs World Cup	(Spain) Arturo Coello	6–2 / 5–7 / 2–6	(Spain) Alejandro Galán (Argentina) Federico Chingotto	
74.	16 November 2025	(United Arab Emirates) Dubai P1	(Spain) Arturo Coello	6–3 / 6–4	(Spain) Alejandro Galán (Argentina) Federico Chingotto	51st
75.	30 November 2025	Mexico Major	(Spain) Arturo Coello	6–4 / 7–6	(Spain) Alejandro Galán (Argentina) Federico Chingotto	52nd
76.	14 December 2025	(Spain) Premier Padel Finals	(Spain) Arturo Coello	6–7 / 6–3 / 7–6	(Spain) Alejandro Galán (Argentina) Federico Chingotto	53rd
77.	14 February 2026	(Saudi Arabia) Riyadh P1	(Spain) Arturo Coello	6–4 / 6–2	(Spain) Alejandro Galán (Argentina) Federico Chingotto	54th
78.	8 March 2026	(Spain) Gijón P2	(Spain) Arturo Coello	5–7 / 6–7	(Spain) Alejandro Galán (Argentina) Federico Chingotto	
79.	22 March 2026	(Mexico) Cancún P2	(Spain) Arturo Coello	6–7 / 6–3 / 7–5	(Spain) Juan Lebrón (Argentina) Leandro Augsburger	55th
80.	29 March 2026	(United States) Miami P1	(Spain) Arturo Coello	5–7 / 6–3 / 3–6	(Spain) Alejandro Galán (Argentina) Federico Chingotto	
81.	26 April 2026	(Belgium) Brussels P2	(Spain) Arturo Coello	6–2 / 3–6 / 3–6	(Spain) Juan Lebrón (Argentina) Leandro Augsburger	
82.	10 May 2026	(Paraguay) Asunción P2	(Spain) Arturo Coello	3–6 / 5–7	Alejandro Galán (Argentina) Federico Chingotto	
83.	17 May 2026	(Argentina) Buenos Aires P1	(Spain) Arturo Coello	2–6 / 1–6	Alejandro Galán (Argentina) Federico Chingotto	
84.	7 June	Italy Major	(Spain) Arturo Coello	7–5 / 7–6	Alejandro Galán (Argentina) Federico Chingotto	56th
85.	14 June	(Spain) Valencia P1	(Spain) Arturo Coello	6–7 / 6–1 / 7–6	Alejandro Galán (Argentina) Federico Chingotto	57th
86.	28 June	(Spain) Valladolid P2	(Spain) Arturo Coello	6–4 / 6–3	Alejandro Galán (Argentina) Federico Chingotto	58th
87.	5 July	(France) Bordeaux P2	(Spain) Arturo Coello	5–7 / 7–6 / 6–2	Alejandro Galán (Argentina) Federico Chingotto	59th
88.	19 July 2026	(Spain) Málaga P1	(Spain) Arturo Coello	6–2 / 6–2	(Spain) Juan Lebrón (Argentina) Leandro Augsburger	60th
89.	9 August 2026	(United Kingdom) London P1	(Spain) Arturo Coello	6–3 / 5–7 / 7–5	(Spain) Alejandro Galán (Argentina) Federico Chingotto	61st
90.	13 September 2026	(France) Paris Major	(Spain) Arturo Coello	6–3 / 4–6 / 7–6	(Spain) Alejandro Galán (Argentina) Federico Chingotto	62nd
91.	4 October 2026	(Netherlands) Rotterdam P2	(Spain) Arturo Coello	6–3 / 6–2	(Argentina) Franco Stupaczuk (Spain) Jon Sanz	63rd
92.	11 October 2026	Germany P2	(Spain) Arturo Coello	6–2 / 7–6	(Argentina) Franco Stupaczuk (Spain) Jon Sanz	64th
93.	18 October 2026	(Italy) Milan P1	(Spain) Arturo Coello	4–6 / 6–3 / 6–2	(Spain) Juan Lebrón (Argentina) Leandro Augsburger	65th
94.	31 October 2026	Kuwait Major	(Spain) Arturo Coello	6–1 / 6–1	(Argentina) Juan Tello (Argentina) Maximiliano Arce	66th

Tournaments won	P2	P1	Major	PP Finals	FIP Pairs World Cup	Total
Tournaments won	11	21	11	1	0	44

=== Padel World Championship ===
N.º	Year	Opponent	Result
1	2022	Spain	2–1
2	2024	Spain	2–1

== Teammates ==
Agustín Tapia has played with 6 different teammates.

- Marcello Jardim (01/2018 – 12/2018)
- Juan Martín Díaz (01/2019 – 08/2019)
- Fernando Belasteguín (08/2019 – 12/2020)
- Pablo Lima (01/2021 – 09/2021)
- Sanyo Gutiérrez (09/2021 – 12/2022)
- Arturo Coello (01/2023 – present)
