= 2025 Madrid P1 =

Padel championships

- Date: 30 August – 7 September
- Edition: 4th
- Category: P1
- Prize money: €474.500
- Location: Madrid, Spain
- Venue: Palacio de Deportes de la Comunidad de Madrid

Champions
- Men's doubles: (Argentina) Leandro Augsburger (Argentina) Martín Di Nenno
- Women's doubles: (Spain) Bea González (Spain) Claudia Fernández

Chronology

The 2025 Madrid P1 (officially 2025 Premier Padel Comunidad de Madrid P1) was the fifteenth tournament of the fourth season organized by Premier Padel, the premier padel circuit, promoted by the International Padel Federation, and with the financial backing of Nasser Al-Khelaïfi's Qatar Sports Investments.

In the women's category, the new world number ones, Delfina Brea and Gemma Triay, faced the number 3 seeds, Bea González and Claudia Fernández, for the second time this season, repeating the Asunción final. In the title match, Bea and Claudia prevailed over the top-ranked pair, securing their third title of the season.

In the men's category, Agustín Tapia and Arturo Coello reached their seventh consecutive final, where they faced two unexpected opponents, Leandro Augsburger and Martín Di Nenno, who had eliminated the number 2 seeds in the quarterfinals and the number 3 seeds in the semifinals. In the final, despite losing the first set, Augsburger and Di Nenno managed to win in three sets against the world number ones to win their first tournament as a pair, marking the first title of Augsburger's career.

== Relevant Data ==
=== First tournament with both winners outside the top 2 ===
With the victories of Bea González and Claudia Fernández in the women's draw and Leandro Augsburger and Martín Di Nenno in the men's, for the first time this season, neither the number 1 nor the number 2 seeds took the title. In other words, it was the only tournament of 2025 not won by Agustín Tapia & Arturo Coello, Alejandro Galán Romo & Federico Chingotto, Delfina Brea & Gemma Triay, or Ariana Sánchez & Paula Josemaria.

Augsburger and Di Nenno also broke a streak where no one had managed to disrupt the hegemony of Coello & Tapia and Chingotto & Galán since the Cancún P2 (on March 16), the last tournament the ranking leaders failed to win due to the conflict between players and Premier Padel. They achieved this through an epic run, eliminating "Chingalán" in the quarterfinals, Juan Lebrón & Franco Stupaczuk in the semifinals, and Coello & Tapia in the grand final, securing their first title as a team and Augsburger's first-ever title.

== Seeds ==
Male

Rnk.	Team	FIP Ranking Points
1	(Argentina) Agustín Tapia (Spain) Arturo Coello	39880
2	(Spain) Alejandro Galán (Argentina) Federico Chingotto	27380
3	(Argentina) Franco Stupaczuk (Spain) Juan Lebrón	16385
4	(Spain) Coki Nieto (Spain) Mike Yanguas	14307
5	(Brazil) Lucas Bergamini (Spain) Paquito Navarro	9765
6	(Spain) Jon Sanz (Spain) Momo Gonzalez	9655
7	(Argentina) Leandro Augsburguer (Argentina) Martin Di Nenno	8642
8	(Argentina) Juan Tello (Spain) Pablo Cardona	6547
9	(Spain) Eduardo Alonso (Spain) Jairo Bautista	6033
10	(Spain) Fran Guerrero (Spain) Javi Leal	5622
11	(Spain) Alejandro Arroyo (United Arab Emirates) Inigo Jofre	4330
12	(Spain) Javier Barahona (Spain) Javier Garcia Mora	4155
13	(Spain) Javier Garrido (Argentina) Juan Cruz Belluati	4090
14	(Argentina) Alex Chozas (Argentina) Leonel Aguirre	4065
15	(Spain) Jose Garcia Diestro (Spain) Juanlu Esbri	4054
16	(Spain) Alejandro Ruiz (Spain) Victor Ruiz	3984

Female

Rnk.	Team	FIP Ranking Points
1	(Argentina) Delfina Brea (Spain) Gemma Triay	31870
2	(Spain) Ariana Sánchez (Spain) Paula Josemaria	31260
3	(Spain) Bea González (Spain) Claudia Fernandéz	22950
4	(Spain) Andrea Ustero (Portugal) Sofia Araújo	13645
5	(Spain) Marta Ortega (Spain) Tamara Icardo	11810
6	(Spain) Alejandra Alonso (Argentina) Claudia Jensen	9555
7	(Argentina) Aranzazu Osoro (Spain) Veronica Virseda	8710
8	(Spain) Alejandra Salazar (Spain) Martina Calvo	7455
9	(Spain) Lucia Sainz (Spain) Patricia Llaguno	7005
10	(Spain) Jessica Castelló (Spain) Lorena Rufo	6245
11	(Spain) Beatriz Caldera (Spain) Carmen Goenaga	5939
12	(Spain) Marina Guinart (Spain) Victoria Iglesias	5890
13	(France) Alix Collombon (Spain) Araceli Martinez	4064
14	(Spain) Marta Barrera (Spain) Marta Caparrós	3798
15	(Russia) Ksenia Sharifova (Argentina) Virginia Riera	3621
16	(Spain) Lucia Martinez Gomez (Spain) Nuria Rodriguez	3565

== Head-to-head record between teams ranked in the top 4 during the season ==
=== Man's ===
Record	Coello–Tapia	Galán–Chingotto	Lebrón–Stupaczuk	Coki–Yanguas
Coello–Tapia	—	5–1	2–1	4–0
Galán–Chingotto	1–5	—	4–1	3–0
Lebrón–Stupaczuk	1–2	1–4	—	—
Coki–Yanguas	0–4	0–3	—	—

=== Women's ===
Record	D. Brea–Triay	Ariana–Paula	Gonzalez–Fernandez	Araújo–Ustero	Former Pairs	Araújo–Ortega
D. Brea–Triay	—	5–1	2–5	2–0		3–0
Ariana–Paula	1–5	—	7–1	2–0		1–1
Gonzalez–Fernandez	5–2	1–7	—	—		—
Araújo–Ustero	0–2	0–2	—	—		—
Former Pairs						
Araújo–Ortega	0–3	1–1	—	—		—

Because the Santiago final ended in a draw, it is not counted.

== Draws ==
=== Men's Bracket ===
Round of 32
1	(Spain) Coello / (Argentina) Tapia	7	6
19	(Spain) D. Sánchez / (Brazil) L. Campagnolo	3	6
27	(Spain) A.F. Lancha / (Spain) A. Cepero	7	3	4
16	(Spain) Á Ruiz / (Spain) V. Ruiz	6	6	6
14	(Argentina) A. Chozas / (Argentina) L. Aguirre	7	4	5
Q	(Argentina) M. Arce / (Spain) P. Lijó	6	6	7
24	(Italy) F. Dominguez / (Spain) J.J. Casas	3	4
5	(Brazil) L. Bergamini / (Spain) Paquito	6	6
8	(Argentina) J. Tello / (Spain) P. Cardona	4	7	6
Q	(Spain) A. Sans / (Spain) M. Quilez	6	6	4
Q	(Spain) A.R. Martinez / (Argentina) J. Rubini	6	6
10	(Spain) F. Guerrero / (Spain) J. Leal	7	7
9	(Spain) E. Alonso / (Spain) J. Bautista	7	6
WC	(Spain) M.H. Hernandez / (Spain) M. Ortega	6	3
18	(Spain) F. Gil / (Argentina) Maxi	2	4
4	(Spain) Coki / (Spain) Yanguas	6	6
3	(Spain) Lebrón / (Argentina) Stupaczuk	6	6
17	(Argentina) G. Alfonso / (Argentina) Sanyo	3	2
Q	(Spain) P. Miñano / (Spain) V. Mena	5	4
13	(Spain) J. Garrido / (Argentina) J.C. Belluati	7	6
11	(Spain) A. Arroyo / (United Arab Emirates) I. Jofre	4	7	6
26	(Spain) E. Goenaga / (Spain) L.H. Quesada	6	6	0
Q	(Argentina) F. Dal Bianco / (Spain) J. Martinez	2	2
6	(Spain) J. Sanz / (Spain) Momo	6	6
7	(Argentina) Di Nenno / (Argentina) L. Augsburger	7	6
Q	(Spain) A. Carnero / (Spain) M. Salguero	5	4
20	(Portugal) M. Deus / (Portugal) N. Deus	1	6	5
12	(Spain) J. Barahona / (Spain) J.G. Mora	6	4	7
15	(Spain) J.G. Diestro / (Spain) J. Esbri	6	6
32	(Spain) P.G. Rodrigo / (Spain) P. Fernandez	4	1
31	(Argentina) F. Mouriño / (Argentina) R. Valenzuela	3	4
2	(Argentina) Chingotto / (Spain) Galán	6	6

Round of 16
1	(Spain) Coello / (Argentina) Tapia	7	6
16	(Spain) Á Ruiz / (Spain) V. Ruiz	6	4
Q	(Argentina) M. Arce / (Spain) P. Lijó	6	6
5	(Brazil) L. Bergamini / (Spain) Paquito	4	4
8	(Argentina) J. Tello / (Spain) P. Cardona	6	6	4
10	(Spain) F. Guerrero / (Spain) J. Leal	4	7	6
9	(Spain) E. Alonso / (Spain) J. Bautista	4	3
4	(Spain) Coki / (Spain) Yanguas	6	6
3	(Spain) Lebrón / (Argentina) Stupaczuk	6	6
13	(Spain) J. Garrido / (Argentina) J.C. Belluati	1	0
11	(Spain) A. Arroyo / (United Arab Emirates) I. Jofre	2	6
6	(Spain) J. Sanz / (Spain) Momo	6	7
7	(Argentina) Di Nenno / (Argentina) L. Augsburger	6	6
12	(Spain) J. Barahona / (Spain) J.G. Mora	3	4
15	(Spain) J.G. Diestro / (Spain) J. Esbri	1	2
2	(Argentina) Chingotto / (Spain) Galán	6	6

Quarter-Final
1	(Spain) Coello / (Argentina) Tapia	7	6	6
Q	(Argentina) M. Arce / (Spain) P. Lijó	6	7	3
10	(Spain) F. Guerrero / (Spain) J. Leal	2	3
3	(Spain) Coki / (Spain) Yanguas	6	6
3	(Spain) Lebrón / (Argentina) Stupaczuk	6	6
6	(Spain) J. Sanz / (Spain) Momo	1	2
7	(Argentina) Di Nenno / (Argentina) L. Augsburger	6	6
2	(Argentina) Chingotto / (Spain) Galán	3	4

Semi-Finals
1	(Spain) Coello / (Argentina) Tapia	6	7
4	(Spain) Coki / (Spain) Yanguas	2	5
3	(Spain) Lebrón / (Argentina) Stupaczuk	6	3	6
7	(Argentina) Di Nenno / (Argentina) L. Augsburger	3	6	7

Finals
1	(Spain) Coello / (Argentina) Tapia	6	3	4
7	(Argentina) Di Nenno / (Argentina) L. Augsburger	4	6	6

=== Women's Bracket ===
Round of 32
1	(Argentina) D. Brea / (Spain) Triay
Bye
20	(Argentina) J. Bidahorria / (Spain) L. Arruabarrena	4	6	0
14	(Spain) M. Barrera / (Spain) M. Caparrós	6	4	6
Q	(Spain) B. Las Heras / (Italy) G. Marchetti	3	0
9	(Spain) L. Sainz / (Spain) P. Llaguno	6	0	*
WC	(Spain) A. Moral / (Spain) R. Lopez	2	2
6	(Spain) A. Alonso / (Argentina) C. Jensen	6	6
7	(Argentina) A. Osoro / (Spain) V. Virseda	6	1
18	(Italy) C. Orsi / (Argentina) M. Goyeneche	7	6
10	(Spain) J. Castelló / (Spain) L. Rufo	7	6
Q	(Spain) J. Bautista / (Spain) N. Aguilar	5	2
19	(Spain) M.R. Abajo / (Spain) N. Canovas	4	2
12	(Spain) M. Guinart / (Spain) V. Iglesias	6	6
Bye
4	(Spain) A. Ustero / (Portugal) S. Araújo
3	(Spain) B. González / (Spain) C. Fernandéz
Bye
22	(Portugal) A. Nogueira / (Spain) M. Merino	2	2
13	(France) A. Collombon / (Spain) A. Martinez	6	6
16	(Spain) L. Martinez / (Spain) N. Rodriguez	2	6	4
17	(Spain) J. Velasco / (Spain) R. Barrera	6	2	6
15	(Russia) K. Sharifova / (Argentina) V. Riera	1	1
5	(Spain) M. Ortega / (Spain) T. Icardo	6	6
8	(Spain) A. Salazar / (Spain) M. Calvo	6	6
Q	(Spain) E. Carnicero / (France) L. Godallier	3	2
Q	(Spain) A. Perez / (Spain) M. Borrero	6	6
23	(Spain) C. Mesa / (Spain) S. Ruiz	3	4
11	(Spain) B. Caldera / (Spain) C. Goenaga	4	6	6
21	(Spain) M. Talavan / (Spain) T. Navarro	6	0	2
Bye
2	(Spain) A. Sánchez / (Spain) P. Josemaria

Round of 16
1	(Argentina) D. Brea / (Spain) Triay	6	6
14	(Spain) M. Barrera / (Spain) M. Caparrós	0	0
9	(Spain) L. Sainz / (Spain) P. Llaguno	2	2
6	(Spain) A. Alonso / (Argentina) C. Jensen	6	6
18	(Italy) C. Orsi / (Argentina) M. Goyeneche	6	6
10	(Spain) J. Castelló / (Spain) L. Rufo	3	3
12	(Spain) M. Guinart / (Spain) V. Iglesias	5	5
4	(Spain) A. Ustero / (Portugal) S. Araújo	7	7
3	(Spain) B. González / (Spain) C. Fernandéz	6	6
13	(France) A. Collombon / (Spain) A. Martinez	2	2
17	(Spain) J. Velasco / (Spain) R. Barrera	7	6
5	(Spain) M. Ortega / (Spain) T. Icardo	5	4
8	(Spain) A. Salazar / (Spain) M. Calvo	6	6
Q	(Spain) A. Perez / (Spain) M. Borrero	1	1
11	(Spain) B. Caldera / (Spain) C. Goenaga	4	2
2	(Spain) A. Sánchez / (Spain) P. Josemaria	6	6

Quarter-Final
1	(Argentina) D. Brea / (Spain) Triay	6	6
6	(Spain) A. Alonso / (Argentina) C. Jensen	1	4
18	(Italy) C. Orsi / (Argentina) M. Goyeneche	4	7	4
4	(Spain) A. Ustero / (Portugal) S. Araújo	6	5	6
3	(Spain) B. González / (Spain) C. Fernandéz	6	6
17	(Spain) J. Velasco / (Spain) R. Barrera	4	2
8	(Spain) A. Salazar / (Spain) M. Calvo	4	7	6
2	(Spain) A. Sánchez / (Spain) P. Josemaria	6	6	1

Semi-Finals
1	(Argentina) D. Brea / (Spain) Triay	6	6
4	(Spain) A. Ustero / (Portugal) S. Araújo	2	4
3	(Spain) B. González / (Spain) C. Fernandéz	6	7
8	(Spain) A. Salazar / (Spain) M. Calvo	4	6

Finals
1	(Argentina) D. Brea / (Spain) Triay	6	1	4
3	(Spain) B. González / (Spain) C. Fernandéz	3	6	6

== Results ==
=== First Round ===
Men's

Date	Winners	Score	Opponent	Refs.
2/9/2025	(Spain) David Gala Sanchez (Brazil) Lucas Campagnolo	6–3 / 6–2	(Spain) Guillermo Collado (Spain) Pol Hernandez	
2/9/2025	(Spain) Alvaro Cepero (Spain) Andres Fernandez Lancha	6–4 / 6–3	(Spain) Ignacio Sager (Spain) Javi Rico	
2/9/2025	(Argentina) Maximiliano Arce (Spain) Pablo Lijó	7–6 / 6–3	(Spain) Aimar Goñi (Argentina) Lucho Capra	
2/9/2025	(Italy) Facundo Dominguez (Spain) Jose Jimenez Casas	6–4 / 6–4	(Spain) Francisco Cabeza (Spain) Teodoro Zapata	
2/9/2025	(Spain) Anton Sans (Spain) Marc Quilez	6–3 / 6–3	(Spain) Roberto Belmont (Spain) Victor Tur Checa	
2/9/2025	(Spain) Alonso Rodriguez (Argentina) Juan Ignacio Rubini	6–1 / 7–5	(Spain) Diego García (Spain) Jose Luis Gonzalez	
2/9/2025	(Spain) Mario Huete Hernandez (Spain) Mario Ortega	3–6 / 6–3 / 6–4	(Argentina) Agustín Gutiérrez (Chile) Javier Valdes	
2/9/2025	(Spain) Francisco Gil Morales (Argentina) Maxi Sánchez	6–4 / 6–3	(Spain) Gonzalo Rubio (Spain) Javi Ruiz	
2/9/2025	(Argentina) Gonzalo Alfonso (Argentina) Sanyo Gutiérrez	6–4 / 7–6	(Italy) Denis Perino (Argentina) Ignacio Piotto	
2/9/2025	(Spain) Pau Miñano (Spain) Victor Mena Gil	6–2 / 6–2	(Spain) Alberto García Jimenez (Spain) Carlos Marti	
2/9/2025	(Spain) Enrique Goenaga (Spain) Luis Hernandez Quesada	2–6 / 6–3 / 7–6	(Argentina) Eduardo Agustin Torre (Italy) Enzo Jensen	
2/9/2025	(Argentina) Franco Dal Bianco (Spain) Javier Martinez Vazquez	6–4 / 6–3	(Spain) Ignacio Vilariño (Spain) Salvador Oria	
2/9/2025	(Spain) Alejandro Jerez (Spain) Manuel Castaño	6–1 / 3–6 / 7–6	(Spain) Adrian Marques (Spain) Marc Sintes	
2/9/2025	(Portugal) Miguel Deus (Portugal) Nuno Deus	7–5 / 6–3	(Spain) Adrian Ronco Lopez (Spain) Miguel Gonzalez García	
2/9/2025	(Spain) Pablo García Rodrigo (Spain) Pincho Fernandez	6–1 / 6–4	(Italy) Aris Patiniotis (Argentina) Gonzalo Alfonso	
2/9/2025	(Argentina) Federico Mouriño (Argentina) Ramiro Valenzuela	6–3 / 1–6 / 6–4	(Spain) Daniel Santigosa (Spain) Emilio Sanchez Chamero	

=== Round of 32 ===
Men's

Date	Winners	Score	Opponent	Refs.
3/9/2025	(Argentina) Agustín Tapia (Spain) Arturo Coello	6–3 / 7–6	(Spain) David Gala Sanchez (Brazil) Lucas Campagnolo	
3/9/2025	(Spain) Aléx Ruiz (Spain) Victor Ruiz	6–7 / 6–3 / 6–4	(Spain) Alvaro Cepero (Spain) Andres Fernandez Lancha	
3/9/2025	(Argentina) Maximiliano Arce (Spain) Pablo Lijó	6–7 / 6–4 / 7–5	(Argentina) Alex Chozas (Argentina) Leonel Aguirre	
3/9/2025	(Brazil) Lucas Bergamini (Spain) Paquito Navarro	6–3 / 6–4	(Italy) Facundo Dominguez (Spain) Jose Jimenez Casas	
3/9/2025	(Argentina) Juan Tello (Spain) Pablo Cardona	4–6 / 7–6 / 6–4	(Spain) Anton Sans (Spain) Marc Quilez	
3/9/2025	(Spain) Francisco Guerrero (Spain) Javier Leal	7–6 / 7–6	(Spain) Alonso Rodriguez (Argentina) Juan Ignacio Rubini	
3/9/2025	(Spain) Eduardo Alonso (Spain) Jairo Bautista	7–6 / 6–3	(Spain) Mario Huete Hernandez (Spain) Mario Ortega	
3/9/2025	(Spain) Coki Nieto (Spain) Mike Yanguas	6–2 / 6–4	(Spain) Francisco Gil Morales (Argentina) Maxi Sánchez	
3/9/2025	(Argentina) Franco Stupaczuk (Spain) Juan Lebrón	6–3 / 6–2	(Argentina) Gonzalo Alfonso (Argentina) Sanyo Gutiérrez	
3/9/2025	(Spain) Javi Garrido (Argentina) Juan Cruz Belluati	7–5 / 6–4	(Spain) Pau Miñano (Spain) Victor Mena Gil	
3/9/2025	(Spain) Alex Arroyo (United Arab Emirates) Iñigo Jofre	4–6 / 7–6 / 6–0	(Spain) Enrique Goenaga (Spain) Luis Hernandez Quesada	
3/9/2025	(Spain) Jon Sanz (Spain) Momo Gonzalez	6–2 / 6–2	(Argentina) Franco Dal Bianco (Spain) Javier Martinez Vazquez	
3/9/2025	(Argentina) Leandro Augsburger (Argentina) Martin Di Nenno	7–5 / 6–4	(Spain) Alejandro Jerez (Spain) Manuel Castaño	
3/9/2025	(Spain) Javier Barahona (Spain) Javier García Mora	6–1 / 4–6 / 7–5	(Portugal) Miguel Deus (Portugal) Nuno Deus	
3/9/2025	(Spain) Jose García Diestro (Spain) Juanlu Esbri	6–4 / 6–1	(Spain) Pablo García Rodrigo (Spain) Pincho Fernandez	
3/9/2025	(Spain) Alejandro Galán (Argentina) Federico Chingotto	6–3 / 6–4	(Argentina) Federico Mouriño (Argentina) Ramiro Valenzuela	

Women's

Date	Winners	Score	Opponent	Refs.
3/9/2025	(Spain) Marta Barrera (Spain) Marta Caparrós	6–4 / 4–6 / 6–0	(Argentina) Julieta Bidahorria (Spain) Lara Arruabarrena	
2/9/2025	(Spain) Lucia Sainz (Spain) Patricia Llaguno	6–3 / W.O.	(Spain) Barbara Las Heras (Italy) Giorgia Marchetti	
2/9/2025	(Spain) Alejandra Alonso (Argentina) Claudia Jensen	6–2 / 6–2	(Spain) Amanda Lopez Moral (Spain) Rebeca Lopez	
2/9/2025	(Italy) Carolina Orsi (Argentina) Martina Fassio Goyeneche	7–6 / 6–1	(Argentina) Aranzazu Osoro (Spain) Verónica Virseda	
2/9/2025	(Spain) Jessica Castelló (Spain) Lorena Rufo	7–5 / 6–2	(Spain) Julia Polo Bautista (Spain) Noemi Aguilar	
3/9/2025	(Spain) Marina Guinart (Spain) Victoria Iglesias	6–4 / 6–2	(Spain) Laia Rodriguez Abajo (Spain) Noa Canovas	
2/9/2025	(France) Alix Collombon (Spain) Araceli Martinez	6–2 / 6–2	(Portugal) Ana Catarina Nogueira (Spain) Melania Merino	
3/9/2025	(Spain) Jimena Velasco (Spain) Raquel Eugenio Barrera	6–2 / 2–6 / 6–4	(Spain) Lucia Martinez Gomez (Spain) Nuria Rodriguez	
3/9/2025	(Spain) Marta Ortega (Spain) Tamara Icardo	6–1 / 6–1	(Russia) Ksenia Sharifova (Argentina) Virginia Riera	
3/9/2025	(Spain) Alejandra Salazar (Spain) Martina Calvo	6–3 / 6–2	(Spain) Esther Carnicero (France) Lea Godallier	
3/9/2025	(Spain) Agueda Perez (Spain) Marta Borrero	6–3 / 6–4	(Spain) Carla Mesa (Spain) Sara Ruiz Soto	
2/9/2025	(Spain) Beatriz Caldera (Spain) Carmen Goenaga	4–6 / 6–0 / 6–2	(Spain) Marta Talavan (Spain) Teresa Navarro	

=== Round of 16 ===
Men's

Date	Winners	Score	Opponent	Refs.
4/9/2025	(Argentina) Agustín Tapia (Spain) Arturo Coello	7–6 / 6–4	(Spain) Aléx Ruiz (Spain) Victor Ruiz	
4/9/2025	(Argentina) Maximiliano Arce (Spain) Pablo Lijó	6–4 / 6–4	(Brazil) Lucas Bergamini (Spain) Paquito Navarro	
4/9/2025	(Spain) Francisco Guerrero (Spain) Javier Leal	4–6 / 7–6 / 6–4	(Argentina) Juan Tello (Spain) Pablo Cardona	
4/9/2025	(Spain) Coki Nieto (Spain) Mike Yanguas	6–4 / 6–3	(Spain) Eduardo Alonso (Spain) Jairo Bautista	
4/9/2025	(Argentina) Franco Stupaczuk (Spain) Juan Lebrón	6–1 / 6–0	(Spain) Javi Garrido (Argentina) Juan Cruz Belluati	
4/9/2025	(Spain) Jon Sanz (Spain) Momo Gonzalez	6–2 / 7–6	(Spain) Alex Arroyo (United Arab Emirates) Iñigo Jofre	
4/9/2025	(Argentina) Leandro Augsburger (Argentina) Martin Di Nenno	6–3 / 6–4	(Spain) Javier Barahona (Spain) Javier García Mora	
4/9/2025	(Spain) Alejandro Galán (Argentina) Federico Chingotto	6–1 / 6–2	(Spain) Jose García Diestro (Spain) Juanlu Esbri	

Women's

Date	Winners	Score	Opponent	Refs.
4/9/2025	(Argentina) Delfina Brea (Spain) Gemma Triay	6–0 / 6–0	(Spain) Marta Barrera (Spain) Marta Caparrós	
4/9/2025	(Spain) Alejandra Alonso (Argentina) Claudia Jensen	6–2 / 6–2	(Spain) Lucia Sainz (Spain) Patricia Llaguno	
4/9/2025	(Italy) Carolina Orsi (Argentina) Martina Fassio Goyeneche	6–3 / 6–3	(Spain) Jessica Castelló (Spain) Lorena Rufo	
4/9/2025	(Spain) Andrea Ustero (Portugal) Sofia Araújo	7–5 / 7–5	(Spain) Marina Guinart (Spain) Victoria Iglesias	
4/9/2025	(Spain) Bea González (Spain) Claudia Fernández	6–2 / 6–2	(France) Alix Collombon (Spain) Araceli Martinez	
4/9/2025	(Spain) Jimena Velasco (Spain) Raquel Eugenio Barrera	7–5 / 6–4	(Spain) Marta Ortega (Spain) Tamara Icardo	
4/9/2025	(Spain) Alejandra Salazar (Spain) Martina Calvo	6–1 / 6–1	(Spain) Agueda Perez (Spain) Marta Borrero	
4/9/2025	(Spain) Ariana Sánchez (Spain) Paula Josemaría	6–4 / 6–2	(Spain) Beatriz Caldera (Spain) Carmen Goenaga	

=== Quarter-Finals ===
Men's

Date	Winners	Score	Opponent	Refs.
5/9/2025	(Argentina) Agustín Tapia (Spain) Arturo Coello	7–6 / 6–7 / 6–3	(Argentina) Maximiliano Arce (Spain) Pablo Lijó	
5/9/2025	(Spain) Coki Nieto (Spain) Mike Yanguas	6–2 / 6–3	(Spain) Francisco Guerrero (Spain) Javier Leal	
5/9/2025	(Argentina) Franco Stupaczuk (Spain) Juan Lebrón	6–1 / 6–2	(Spain) Jon Sanz (Spain) Momo Gonzalez	
5/9/2025	(Argentina) Leandro Augsburger (Argentina) Martin Di Nenno	6–3 / 6–4	(Spain) Alejandro Galán (Argentina) Federico Chingotto	

Women's

Date	Winners	Score	Opponent	Refs.
5/9/2025	(Argentina) Delfina Brea (Spain) Gemma Triay	6–1 / 6–4	(Spain) Alejandra Alonso (Argentina) Claudia Jensen	
5/9/2025	(Spain) Andrea Ustero (Portugal) Sofia Araújo	6–4 / 5–7 / 6–4	(Italy) Carolina Orsi (Argentina) Martina Fassio Goyeneche	
5/9/2025	(Spain) Bea González (Spain) Claudia Fernández	6–4 / 6–2	(Spain) Jimena Velasco (Spain) Raquel Eugenio Barrera	
5/9/2025	(Spain) Alejandra Salazar (Spain) Martina Calvo	4–6 / 7–6 / 6–1	(Spain) Ariana Sánchez (Spain) Paula Josemaría	

=== Semi-Finals ===
Men's

Date	Winners	Score	Opponent	Refs.
6/9/2025	(Argentina) Agustín Tapia (Spain) Arturo Coello	6–2 / 7–5	(Spain) Coki Nieto (Spain) Mike Yanguas	
6/9/2025	(Argentina) Leandro Augsburger (Argentina) Martin Di Nenno	3–6 / 6–3 / 7–6	(Argentina) Franco Stupaczuk (Spain) Juan Lebrón	

Women's

Date	Winners	Score	Opponent	Refs.
6/9/2025	(Argentina) Delfina Brea (Spain) Gemma Triay	6–2 / 6–4	(Spain) Andrea Ustero (Portugal) Sofia Araújo	
6/9/2025	(Spain) Bea González (Spain) Claudia Fernández	6–4 / 7–6	(Spain) Alejandra Salazar (Spain) Martina Calvo	

=== Finals ===
Men's

Date	Winners	Score	Opponent	Refs.
7/9/2025	(Argentina) Leandro Augsburger (Argentina) Martin Di Nenno	4–6 / 6–3 / 6–4	(Argentina) Agustín Tapia (Spain) Arturo Coello	

Women's

Date	Winners	Score	Opponent	Refs.
7/9/2025	(Spain) Bea González (Spain) Claudia Fernández	3–6 / 6–1 / 6–4	(Argentina) Delfina Brea (Spain) Gemma Triay	
