= 2026 Valladolid P2 =

Premier Padel tournament held in Valladolid

- Date: 21 – 28 June
- Edition: 3rd
- Category: P2
- Prize money: €264.534
- Location: Valladolid, Spain
- Venue: Plaza Mayor
- Court speed: Fast

Champions
- Men's doubles: (Argentina) Agustín Tapia (Spain) Arturo Coello
- Women's doubles: (Spain) Bea González (Spain) Paula Josemaría

Chronology

The 2026 Valladolid P2 (officially 2026 Premier Padel Oysho Valladolid P2) was the eleventh tournament of the fifth season organized by Premier Padel, the premier padel circuit, promoted by the International Padel Federation, and with the financial backing of Nasser Al-Khelaïfi's Qatar Sports Investments.

In the women's category, for the first time this season, the second and third-ranked pairs in the FIP rankings both reached the final. In the final, Bea González and Paula Josemaría defeated Ariana Sánchez and Andrea Ustero in straight sets, claiming their sixth title of 2026.

In the men's category, the top two pairs in the FIP rankings reached the final for the fifth consecutive tournament, marking the eighth time this season. In the title match, Agustín Tapia and Arturo Coello defeated Alejandro Galán and Federico Chingotto in straight sets, claiming their fifth title of 2026.

== Relevant Data ==
=== Ariana and Paula face off in a final for the first time ===
At the Valladolid P2, Ariana Sánchez and Paula Josemaría faced each other in a title match for the first time since parting ways as a team. The pair, who played together for five years, had previously faced each other this season only in semifinals. This marked their first final against one another.

=== Coello and Tapia Reach 25th Consecutive Final ===
After defeating the world No. 3 ranked pair, Juan Lebrón and Leandro Augsburger, the world number ones have reached their 25th consecutive final, a record in padel.

== Seeds ==
Male

Rnk.	Team	FIP Ranking Points
1	(Argentina) Agustín Tapia (Spain) Arturo Coello	43388
2	(Spain) Alejandro Galán (Argentina) Federico Chingotto	35338
3	(Spain) Juan Lebrón (Argentina) Leandro Augsburguer	14839
4	(Argentina) Franco Stupaczuk (Spain) Mike Yanguas	13967
5	(Spain) Coki Nieto (Spain) Jon Sanz	11091
6	(Argentina) Martín Di Nenno (Spain) Paquito Navarro	10936
7	(Spain) Francisco Guerrero (Spain) Javi Leal	7771
8	(Brazil) Lucas Campagnolo (Spain) Momo González	7398
9	(Spain) Alejandro Ruiz (Spain) Juanlu Esbri	4949
10	(Spain) Aimar Goñi (Spain) Eduardo Alonso	4945
11	(Spain) Javier Garcia Mora (Spain) Jose Jimenez Casas	4499
12	(Spain) Alejandro Arroyo (Argentina) Leonel Aguirre	4481
13	(United Arab Emirates) Inigo Jofre (Spain) Jairo Bautista	4198
14	(Spain) Guillermo Collado (Spain) Pol Hernandez	3972
15	(Argentina) Alex Chozas (Argentina) Valentino Libaak	3809
16	(Argentina) Maximiliano Sánchez Blasco (Argentina) Sanyo Gutiérrez	3587

Female

Rnk.	Team	FIP Ranking Points
1	(Argentina) Delfina Brea (Spain) Gemma Triay	35588
2	(Spain) Bea González (Spain) Paula Josemaria	28826
3	(Spain) Ariana Sánchez (Spain) Andrea Ustero	23223
4	(Spain) Claudia Fernandéz (Portugal) Sofia Araújo	19586
5	(Argentina) Claudia Jensen (Spain) Tamara Icardo	12033
6	(Spain) Marta Ortega (Spain) Martina Calvo	11528
7	(Spain) Alejandra Alonso (Spain) Alejandra Salazar	9781
8	(Spain) Marina Guinart (Spain) Veronica Virseda	8161
9	(Spain) Beatriz Caldera (Spain) Carmen Goenaga	6938
10	(Argentina) Aranzazu Osoro (Spain) Victoria Iglesias	6196
11	(Argentina) Martina Fassio Goyeneche (Spain) Raquel Eugenio Barrera	5254
12	(Italy) Carolina Orsi (Spain) Patricia Llaguno	4803
13	(Spain) Jessica Castelló (Spain) Lorena Rufo	4734
14	(Spain) Jimena Velasco (Spain) Marta Barrera	4366
15	(Spain) Lucía Sainz (Spain) Jana Montes Cabruja	4150
16	(France) Alix Collombon (Russia) Ksenia Sharifova	3433

== Head-to-head record between teams ranked in the top 4 during the season ==
=== Men's ===
Record	Coello–Tapia	Galán–Chingotto	Augsburger–Lebrón	Stupaczuk–Yanguas
Coello–Tapia	—	4–4	5–1	5–0
Galán–Chingotto	4–4	—	3–1	2–0
Augsburger–Lebrón	1–5	1–3	—	—
Stupaczuk–Yanguas	0–5	0–2	—	—

=== Women's ===
Record	D. Brea–Triay	B. González–Paula	Ariana–Ustero	Araúijo–C. Fernandez
D. Brea–Triay	—	1–5	3–3	3–0
B. González–Paula	5–1	—	4–3	2–0
Ariana–Ustero	3–3	3–4	—	1–0
Araúijo–C. Fernandez	0–3	0–2	0–1	—

== Draws ==
=== Men's Bracket ===
Round of 32
1	(Spain) Coello / (Argentina) Tapia
Bye
15	(Argentina) A. Chozas / (Argentina) V. Libaak	6	7
16	(Argentina) M. Blasco / (Argentina) Sanyo	4	6
18	(Spain) P.G. Rodrigo / (Spain) P. Lijó	6	6
WC	(Spain) A. Arriaga / (Spain) S. Rivas	3	1
13	(United Arab Emirates) I. Jofre / (Spain) J. Bautista	7	2	*
5	(Spain) Coki / (Spain) J. Sanz	5	1
8	(Brazil) L. Campagnolo / (Spain) Momo	6	6
21	(Spain) M. Ortega / (Spain) V. Ruiz	3	1
Q	(Spain) J. Zamora / (Portugal) P. Perry	2	4
9	(Spain) A. Ruiz / (Spain) J. Esbri	6	6
Q	(Spain) D. Santigosa / (Spain) M. Sintes	6	5	0
14	(Spain) G. Collado / (Spain) P.H. Alvarez	4	7	6
Bye
3	(Spain) Lebrón / (Argentina) L. Augsburger
4	(Argentina) Stupaczuk / (Spain) Yanguas
Bye
12	(Spain) A. Arroyo / (Argentina) L. Aguirre	6	3	3
Q	(Spain) F. Gil (Spain) M. Castaño	4	6	6
10	(Spain) A. Goñi / (Spain) E. Alonso	6	4
Q	(Spain) A. Martinez / (Argentina) J. De Pascual	7	6
19	(Spain) G. Rubio / (Spain) J. Ruiz	7	2	3
7	(Spain) F. Guerrero / (Spain) J. Leal	6	6	6
6	(Argentina) Di Nenno / (Spain) Paquito	7	6
11	(Spain) J.G. Mora / (Spain) J.J. Casas	5	4
WC	(Sweden) A. Axelsson / (Spain) R. Coello	7	7
17	(Spain) D.G. Sánchez / (Italy) E. Jensen	5	6
20	(Argentina) I. Piotto / (Spain) J.G. Diestro	3	4
22	(Spain) J. Martinez / (Spain) L.H. Quesada	6	6
Bye
2	(Argentina) Chingotto / (Spain) Galán

Round of 16
1	(Spain) Coello / (Argentina) Tapia	6	6
15	(Argentina) A. Chozas / (Argentina) V. Libaak	2	3
18	(Spain) P.G. Rodrigo / (Spain) P. Lijó	5	6
13	(United Arab Emirates) I. Jofre / (Spain) J. Bautista	7	7
8	(Brazil) L. Campagnolo / (Spain) Momo	7	6
9	(Spain) A. Ruiz / (Spain) J. Esbri	6	0
14	(Spain) G. Collado / (Spain) P.H. Alvarez	6	5
3	(Spain) Lebrón / (Argentina) L. Augsburger	7	7
4	(Argentina) Stupaczuk / (Spain) Yanguas	3	6	6
Q	(Spain) F. Gil (Spain) M. Castaño	6	3	3
Q	(Spain) A. Martinez / (Argentina) J. De Pascual	1	1
7	(Spain) F. Guerrero / (Spain) J. Leal	6	6
6	(Argentina) Di Nenno / (Spain) Paquito	7	7
WC	(Sweden) A. Axelsson / (Spain) R. Coello	5	6
22	(Spain) J. Martinez / (Spain) L.H. Quesada	3	3
2	(Argentina) Chingotto / (Spain) Galán	6	6

Quarter-Final
1	(Spain) Coello / (Argentina) Tapia	6	6
13	(United Arab Emirates) I. Jofre / (Spain) J. Bautista	1	4
8	(Brazil) L. Campagnolo / (Spain) Momo
3	(Spain) Lebrón / (Argentina) L. Augsburger	*
4	(Argentina) Stupaczuk / (Spain) Yanguas	6	4
7	(Spain) F. Guerrero / (Spain) J. Leal	7	6
6	(Argentina) Di Nenno / (Spain) Paquito	1	4
2	(Argentina) Chingotto / (Spain) Galán	6	6

Semi-Finals
1	(Spain) Coello / (Argentina) Tapia	6	6
3	(Spain) Lebrón / (Argentina) L. Augsburger	4	4
7	(Spain) F. Guerrero / (Spain) J. Leal	4	6	3
2	(Argentina) Chingotto / (Spain) Galán	6	1	6

Finals
1	(Spain) Coello / (Argentina) Tapia	6	6
2	(Argentina) Chingotto / (Spain) Galán	4	3

=== Women's Bracket ===
Round of 32
1	(Argentina) D. Brea / (Spain) G. Triay
Bye
9	(Spain) B. Caldera / (Spain) C. Goenaga	6	6
14	(Spain) J. Velasco / (Spain) M. Barrera	3	2
11	(Argentina) M. Goyeneche / (Spain) R. Barrera	6	6
WC	(Spain) M. Moriñigo / (Spain) N. Paniagua	4	2
Bye
6	(Spain) M. Ortega / (Spain) M. Calvo
8	(Spain) M. Guinart / (Spain) V. Virseda
Bye
Q	(Spain) M. Talavan / (Spain) S. Saiz	7	6
Q	(Italy) G. Marchetti / (Spain) M. Borrero	6	3
13	(Spain) J. Castelló / (Spain) L. Rufo	7	6
Q	(Spain) A. Moral / (France) C. Touly	6	3
Bye
3	(Spain) A. Ustero / (Spain) A. Sánchez
4	(Spain) C. Fernández / (Portugal) S. Araújo
Bye
Q	(Italy) G. Dal Pozzo / (Spain) N. Rodriguez	6	6
18	(Spain) T. Navarro / (Argentina) V. Riera	3	1
16	(France) A. Collombon / (Russia) K. Sharifova	3	3
19	(Argentina) J. Bidahorria / (Spain) M. Caparros	6	6
Bye
7	(Spain) A. Salazar / (Spain) A. Alonso
5	(Argentina) C. Jensen / (Spain) T. Icardo
Bye
12	(Italy) C. Orsi / (Spain) P. Llaguno	3	6	5
15	(Spain) J. Montes / (Spain) L. Sainz	6	3	7
10	(Argentina) A. Osoro / (Spain) V. Iglesias	4	6	6
17	(Spain) A. Perez / (Spain) L. Martinez	6	1	3
Bye
2	(Spain) B. González / (Spain) P. Josemaria

Round of 16
1	(Argentina) D. Brea / (Spain) G. Triay	7	6
9	(Spain) B. Caldera / (Spain) C. Goenaga	5	0
11	(Argentina) M. Goyeneche / (Spain) R. Barrera	7	7
6	(Spain) M. Ortega / (Spain) M. Calvo	6	5
8	(Spain) M. Guinart / (Spain) V. Virseda	7	7
Q	(Spain) M. Talavan / (Spain) S. Saiz	5	6
13	(Spain) J. Castelló / (Spain) L. Rufo	2	2
3	(Spain) A. Ustero / (Spain) A. Sánchez	6	6
4	(Spain) C. Fernández / (Portugal) S. Araújo	6	6	4
Q	(Italy) G. Dal Pozzo / (Spain) N. Rodriguez	4	7	6
19	(Argentina) J. Bidahorria / (Spain) M. Caparros	4	4
7	(Spain) A. Salazar / (Spain) A. Alonso	6	6
5	(Argentina) C. Jensen / (Spain) T. Icardo	6	6
15	(Spain) J. Montes / (Spain) L. Sainz	4	3
10	(Argentina) A. Osoro / (Spain) V. Iglesias	3	3
2	(Spain) B. González / (Spain) P. Josemaria	6	6

Quarter-Final
1	(Argentina) D. Brea / (Spain) G. Triay	3	6	6
11	(Argentina) M. Goyeneche / (Spain) R. Barrera	6	3	2
8	(Spain) M. Guinart / (Spain) V. Virseda	6	1
3	(Spain) A. Ustero / (Spain) A. Sánchez	7	6
Q	(Italy) G. Dal Pozzo / (Spain) N. Rodriguez	6	6
7	(Spain) A. Salazar / (Spain) A. Alonso	1	1
5	(Argentina) C. Jensen / (Spain) T. Icardo	4	4
2	(Spain) B. González / (Spain) P. Josemaria	6	6

Semi-Finals
1	(Argentina) D. Brea / (Spain) G. Triay	3	6
3	(Spain) A. Ustero / (Spain) A. Sánchez	6	7
Q	(Italy) G. Dal Pozzo / (Spain) N. Rodriguez	0	6	4
2	(Spain) B. González / (Spain) P. Josemaria	6	4	6

Finals
3	(Spain) A. Ustero / (Spain) A. Sánchez	4	2
2	(Spain) B. González / (Spain) P. Josemaria	6	6

== Results ==
=== Round of 32 ===
Men's

Date	Winners	Score	Opponent	Refs.
24/6/2026	(Argentina) Alex Chozas (Argentina) Valentino Libaak	6–4 / 7–6	(Argentina) Maximiliano Sánchez Blasco (Argentina) Sanyo Gutiérrez	
24/6/2026	(Spain) Pablo Garcia Rodrigo (Spain) Pablo Lijó	6–3 / 6–1	(Spain) Alfonso Sánchez (Spain) Samuel Rivas Garcia	
24/6/2026	(United Arab Emirates) Inigo Jofre (Spain) Jairo Bautista	7–5 / 2–1 / W.O.	(Spain) Coki Nieto (Spain) Jon Sanz	
24/6/2026	(Brazil) Lucas Campagnolo (Spain) Momo González	6–3 / 6–1	(Spain) Mario Ortega (Spain) Victor Ruiz	
24/6/2026	(Spain) Aléx Ruiz (Spain) Juanlu Esbri	6–2 / 6–4	(Spain) Juan Zamora Perez (Portugal) Pedro Perry	
24/6/2026	(Spain) Guillermo Collado (Spain) Pol Hernandez	4–6 / 7–5 / 6–0	(Spain) Daniel Santigosa (Spain) Marc Sintes	
24/6/2026	(Spain) Francisco Gil Morales (Spain) Manuel Castaño	4–6 / 6–3 / 6–3	(Spain) Alex Arroyo (Argentina) Leonel Aguirre	
24/6/2026	(Spain) Alonso Rodriguez Martinez (Argentina) Juan De Pascual	7–6 / 6–4	(Spain) Aimar Goñi (Spain) Eduardo Alonso	
23/6/2026	(Spain) Francisco Guerrero (Spain) Javi Leal	6–7 / 6–2 / 6–3	(Spain) Gonzalo Rubio (Spain) Javier Ruiz	
24/6/2026	(Argentina) Martin Di Nenno (Spain) Paquito Navarro	7–5 / 6–4	(Spain) Javier Garcia Mora (Spain) Jose Jimenez Casas	
24/6/2026	(Sweden) Adam Axelsson (Spain) Rodrigo Coello	7–5 / 7–6	(Spain) David Gala Sánchez (Italy) Enzo Jensen	
23/6/2026	(Spain) Javier Martinez (Spain) Luis Hernandez Quesada	6–3 / 6–4	(Argentina) Ignacio Piotto (Spain) Jose Garcia Diestro	

Women's

Date	Winners	Score	Opponent	Refs.
24/6/2026	(Spain) Beatriz Caldera (Spain) Carmen Goenaga	6–3 / 6–2	(Spain) Jimena Velasco (Spain) Marta Barrera	
24/6/2026	(Argentina) Martina Fassio Goyeneche (Spain) Raquel Eugenio Barrera	6–4 / 6–2	(Spain) Maria Moriñigo Gomez (Spain) Natalia Molinilla Paniagua	
24/6/2026	(Spain) Marta Talavan (Spain) Sofía Saiz Vallejo	7–6 / 6–3	(Italy) Giorgia Marchetti (Spain) Marta Borrero	
24/6/2026	(Spain) Jessica Castelló (Spain) Lorena Rufo	7–6 / 6–3	(Spain) Amanda Lopez Moral (France) Carla Touly	
24/6/2026	(Italy) Giulia Dal Pozzo (Spain) Nuria Rodriguez	6–3 / 6–1	(Spain) Teresa Navarro (Argentina) Virginia Riera	
24/6/2026	(Argentina) Julieta Bidahorria (Spain) Marta Caparros	6–3 / 6–3	(France) Alix Collombon (Russia) Ksenia Sharifova	
24/6/2026	(Spain) Lucía Sainz (Spain) Jana Montes	6–3 / 3–6 / 7–5	(Italy) Carolina Orsi (Spain) Patricia Llaguno	
24/6/2026	(Argentina) Aranzazu Osoro (Spain) Victoria Iglesias	4–6 / 6–1 / 6–3	(Spain) Agueda Perez (Spain) Lucia Martinez	

=== Round of 16 ===
Men's

Date	Winners	Score	Opponent	Refs.
25/6/2026	(Argentina) Agustín Tapia (Spain) Arturo Coello	6–2 / 6–3	(Argentina) Alex Chozas (Argentina) Valentino Libaak	
25/6/2026	(United Arab Emirates) Inigo Jofre (Spain) Jairo Bautista	7–5 / 7–6	(Spain) Pablo Garcia Rodrigo (Spain) Pablo Lijó	
25/6/2026	(Brazil) Lucas Campagnolo (Spain) Momo González	7–6 / 6–0	(Spain) Aléx Ruiz (Spain) Juanlu Esbri	
25/6/2026	(Spain) Juan Lebrón (Argentina) Leandro Augsburger	7–6 / 7–5	(Spain) Guillermo Collado (Spain) Pol Hernandez	
25/6/2026	(Argentina) Franco Stupaczuk (Spain) Mike Yanguas	3–6 / 6–3 / 6–3	(Spain) Francisco Gil Morales (Spain) Manuel Castaño	
25/6/2026	(Spain) Francisco Guerrero (Spain) Javi Leal	6–1 / 6–1	(Spain) Alonso Rodriguez Martinez (Argentina) Juan De Pascual	
25/6/2026	(Argentina) Martin Di Nenno (Spain) Paquito Navarro	7–5 / 7–6	(Sweden) Adam Axelsson (Spain) Rodrigo Coello	
25/6/2026	(Spain) Alejandro Galán (Argentina) Federico Chingotto	6–3 / 6–3	(Spain) Javier Martinez (Spain) Luis Hernandez Quesada	

Women's

Date	Winners	Score	Opponent	Refs.
25/6/2026	(Argentina) Delfina Brea (Spain) Gemma Triay	7–5 / 6–0	(Spain) Beatriz Caldera (Spain) Carmen Goenaga	
25/6/2026	(Argentina) Martina Fassio Goyeneche (Spain) Raquel Eugenio Barrera	7–6 / 7–5	(Spain) Marta Ortega (Spain) Martina Calvo	
25/6/2026	(Spain) Marina Guinart (Spain) Verónica Virseda	7–5 / 7–6	(Spain) Marta Talavan (Spain) Sofía Saiz Vallejo	
25/6/2026	(Spain) Andrea Ustero (Spain) Ariana Sánchez	6–2 / 6–2	(Spain) Jessica Castelló (Spain) Lorena Rufo	
25/6/2026	(Italy) Giulia Dal Pozzo (Spain) Nuria Rodriguez	4–6 / 7–6 / 6–4	(Spain) Claudia Fernández (Portugal) Sofia Araújo	
25/6/2026	(Spain) Alejandra Alonso (Spain) Alejandra Salazar	6–4 / 6–4	(Argentina) Julieta Bidahorria (Spain) Marta Caparros	
25/6/2026	(Argentina) Claudia Jensen (Spain) Tamara Icardo	6–4 / 6–3	(Spain) Lucía Sainz (Spain) Jana Montes	
25/6/2026	(Spain) Bea González (Spain) Paula Josemaría	6–3 / 6–3	(Argentina) Aranzazu Osoro (Spain) Victoria Iglesias	

=== Quarter-Finals ===
Men's

Date	Winners	Score	Opponent	Refs.
26/6/2026	(Argentina) Agustín Tapia (Spain) Arturo Coello	6–1 / 6–4	(United Arab Emirates) Inigo Jofre (Spain) Jairo Bautista	
26/6/2026	(Spain) Juan Lebrón (Argentina) Leandro Augsburger	W.O.	(Brazil) Lucas Campagnolo (Spain) Momo González	
26/6/2026	(Spain) Francisco Guerrero (Spain) Javi Leal	7–6 / 6–4	(Argentina) Franco Stupaczuk (Spain) Mike Yanguas	
26/6/2026	(Spain) Alejandro Galán (Argentina) Federico Chingotto	6–1 / 6–4	(Argentina) Martin Di Nenno (Spain) Paquito Navarro	

Women's

Date	Winners	Score	Opponent	Refs.
26/6/2026	(Argentina) Delfina Brea (Spain) Gemma Triay	3–6 / 6–3 / 6–2	(Argentina) Martina Fassio Goyeneche (Spain) Raquel Eugenio Barrera	
26/6/2026	(Spain) Andrea Ustero (Spain) Ariana Sánchez	7–6 / 6–1	(Spain) Marina Guinart (Spain) Verónica Virseda	
26/6/2026	(Italy) Giulia Dal Pozzo (Spain) Nuria Rodriguez	6–1 / 6–1	(Spain) Alejandra Alonso (Spain) Alejandra Salazar	
26/6/2026	(Spain) Bea González (Spain) Paula Josemaría	6–4 / 6–4	(Argentina) Claudia Jensen (Spain) Tamara Icardo	

=== Semi-Finals ===
Men's

Date	Winners	Score	Opponent	Refs.
27/6/2026	(Argentina) Agustín Tapia (Spain) Arturo Coello	6–4 / 6–4	(Spain) Juan Lebrón (Argentina) Leandro Augsburger	
27/6/2026	(Spain) Alejandro Galán (Argentina) Federico Chingotto	6–4 / 1–6 / 6–3	(Spain) Francisco Guerrero (Spain) Javi Leal	

Women's

Date	Winners	Score	Opponent	Refs.
27/6/2026	(Spain) Andrea Ustero (Spain) Ariana Sánchez	6–3 / 7–6	(Argentina) Delfina Brea (Spain) Gemma Triay	
27/6/2026	(Spain) Bea González (Spain) Paula Josemaría	6–0 / 4–6 / 6–4	(Italy) Giulia Dal Pozzo (Spain) Nuria Rodriguez	

=== Finals ===
Men's

Date	Winners	Score	Opponent	Refs.
28/6/2026	(Argentina) Agustín Tapia (Spain) Arturo Coello	6–4 / 6–3	(Spain) Alejandro Galán (Argentina) Federico Chingotto	

Women's

Date	Winners	Score	Opponent	Refs.
28/6/2026	(Spain) Bea González (Spain) Paula Josemaría	6–4 / 6–2	(Spain) Andrea Ustero (Spain) Ariana Sánchez	
