= 2025 Milan P1 =

Padel championships

- Date: 4 – 12 October
- Edition: 4th
- Category: P1
- Prize money: €474.500
- Location: Milan, Italy
- Venue: Allianz Cloud

Champions
- Men's doubles: (Spain) Alejandro Galán (Argentina) Federico Chingotto
- Women's doubles: (Spain) Ariana Sánchez (Spain) Paula Josemaría

Chronology

The 2025 Milano P1 (officially 2025 Premier Padel Oysho Milano P1) was the nineteen tournament of the fourth season organized by Premier Padel, the premier padel circuit, promoted by the International Padel Federation, and with the financial backing of Nasser Al-Khelaïfi's Qatar Sports Investments.

In the women's category, the 2nd and 3rd ranked pairs by the FIP both reached the finals for the fourth time in 2025. In the title match, Ariana Sánchez and Paula Josemaría defeated Bea González and Claudia Fernández for the fourth time in a final, securing their fifth title of the season.

In the men's category, the top two pairs in the FIP rankings faced each other in a final for the fourth consecutive time, and the tenth time in 2025. In the battle for the title, Alejandro Galán and Federico Chingotto defeated Agustín Tapia and Arturo Coello in three sets, marking their third victory over the pair this year, and secured their sixth title of the season.

== Relevant Data ==
=== Ariana and Paula's fifth title ===
With their victory in the finals, Ariana Sánchez and Paula Josemaría ended a 105-day drought, securing their fifth title of the season following wins in Riyadh, Brussels, Buenos Aires, and Valladolid.

=== Coello and Tapia held scoreless for the first time ===
With their finals victory, Alejandro Galán and Federico Chingotto achieved a remarkable feat alongside the title win. For the first time since joining forces in January 2023, Arturo Coello and Agustín Tapia lost a set 6–0. Although they had previously lost a set 6–1, such as in Genoa, never before in 288 matches had the world number ones failed to win a single game in a set.

== Seeds ==
Male

Rnk.	Team	FIP Ranking Points
1	(Argentina) Agustín Tapia (Spain) Arturo Coello	36800
2	(Spain) Alejandro Galán (Argentina) Federico Chingotto	25940
3	(Argentina) Franco Stupaczuk (Spain) Juan Lebrón	16070
4	(Spain) Coki Nieto (Spain) Mike Yanguas	14741
5	(Spain) Jon Sanz (Spain) Paquito Navarro	9465
6	(Argentina) Leandro Augsburguer (Argentina) Martin Di Nenno	9077
7	(Spain) Francisco Guerrero (Spain) Momo Gonzalez	7915
8	(Brazil) Lucas Bergamini (Spain) Javi Leal	7717
9	(Spain) Eduardo Alonso (Argentina) Juan Tello	6114
10	(Argentina) Gonzalo Alfonso (Spain) Pablo Cardona	5260
11	(Spain) Javier Barahona (Spain) Javier Garcia Mora	4830
12	(Spain) Javier Garrido (Brazil) Lucas Campagnolo	4435
13	(Spain) Alejandro Arroyo (United Arab Emirates) Inigo Jofre	4431
14	(Spain) Jairo Bautista (Argentina) Valentino Libaak	4335
15	(Spain) Alejandro Ruiz (Spain) Juanlu Esbri	4083
16	(Argentina) Leonel Aguirre (Argentina) Sanyo Gutiérrez	3851

Female

Rnk.	Team	FIP Ranking Points
1	(Argentina) Delfina Brea (Spain) Gemma Triay	34010
2	(Spain) Ariana Sánchez (Spain) Paula Josemaria	26460
3	(Spain) Bea González (Spain) Claudia Fernandéz	22880
4	(Spain) Andrea Ustero (Portugal) Sofia Araújo	13355
5	(Spain) Marta Ortega (Spain) Tamara Icardo	13040
6	(Spain) Alejandra Alonso (Argentina) Claudia Jensen	9925
7	(Spain) Alejandra Salazar (Spain) Martina Calvo	7493
8	(Spain) Marina Guinart (Spain) Veronica Virseda	7180
9	(Argentina) Aranzazu Osoro (Spain) Victoria Iglesias	6410
10	(Spain) Beatriz Caldera (Spain) Carmen Goenaga	6222
11	(Spain) Lucia Sainz (Spain) Patricia Llaguno	6025
12	(Spain) Jessica Castelló (Spain) Lorena Rufo	5345
13	(France) Alix Collombon (Spain) Araceli Martinez	4200
14	(Spain) Marta Barrera (Spain) Marta Caparrós	4165
15	(Russia) Ksenia Sharifova (Argentina) Virginia Riera	3713
16	(Italy) Carolina Orsi (Argentina) Martina Fassio Goyeneche	3580

== Head-to-head record between teams ranked in the top 4 during the season ==
=== Man's ===
Record	Coello–Tapia	Galán–Chingotto	Lebrón–Stupaczuk	Coki–Yanguas
Coello–Tapia	—	7–3	4–1	5–0
Galán–Chingotto	3–7	—	5–1	5–0
Lebrón–Stupaczuk	1–4	1–5	—	—
Coki–Yanguas	0–5	0–5	—	—

=== Women's ===
Record	D. Brea–Triay	Ariana–Paula	Gonzalez–Fernandez	Araújo–Ustero	Former Pairs	Araújo–Ortega
D. Brea–Triay	—	7–1	2–6	3–0		3–0
Ariana–Paula	1–7	—	8–1	4–0		1–1
Gonzalez–Fernandez	6–2	1–8	—	—		—
Araújo–Ustero	0–3	0–4	—	—		—
Former Pairs						
Araújo–Ortega	0–3	1–1	—	—		—

Because the Santiago final ended in a draw, it is not counted.

== Draws ==
=== Men's Bracket ===
Round of 32
1	(Spain) Coello / (Argentina) Tapia	6	2	*
19	(Portugal) M. Deus / (Portugal) N. Deus	3	1
Q	(Spain) D. Santigosa / (Spain) M. Sintes	5	5
15	(Spain) A. Ruiz / (Spain) J. Esbri	7	7
13	(Spain) A. Arroyo / (United Arab Emirates) I. Jofre	6	7
32	(Italy) F. Dominguez / (Spain) J. Martinez	3	5
Q	(Paraguay) M. Abud / (Spain) R. Mendez	2	5
5	(Spain) J. Sanz / (Spain) Paquito	6	7
7	(Spain) F. Guerrero / (Spain) Momo	6	6
29	(Spain) J.J. Casas / (Argentina) M.S. Blasco	3	3
Q	(Argentina) F. Mouriño / (Argentina) R. Valenzuela	3	6	6
16	(Argentina) L. Aguirre / (Argentina) Sanyo	6	1	3
12	(Spain) J. Garrido / (Brazil) L. Campagnolo	7	6
Q	(Spain) M. Del Castillo / (Spain) M.H. Hernandez	6	1
20	(Argentina) A. Chozas / (Spain) D. Sánchez	3	5
3	(Spain) Lebrón / (Argentina) Stupaczuk	6	7
4	(Spain) Coki / (Spain) Yanguas	3	6	3
23	(Spain) G. Collado / (Spain) P.H. Alvarez	6	3	6
25	(Argentina) E. Torre / (Spain) M. Ortega	2	3
11	(Spain) J. Barahona / (Spain) J.G. Mora	6	6
14	(Spain) J. Bautista / (Argentina) V. Libaak	6	7	6
Q	(Argentina) J. De Pascual / (Argentina) M. Lamperti	7	6	7
35	(Spain) E. Chamero / (Italy) E. Jensen	6	2
6	(Argentina) Di Nenno / (Argentina) L. Augsburger	7	6
8	(Spain) J. Leal / (Brazil) L. Bergamini	6	6
37	(Spain) A.R. Martinez / (Argentina) J. Rubini	3	2
34	(Argentina) M. Arce / (Spain) P. Lijó	6	6
17	(Spain) J.G. Diestro / (Spain) V. Ruiz	4	2
9	(Spain) E. Alonso / (Argentina) J. Tello	6	6
21	(Spain) F. Gil / (Argentina) Maxi	4	3
LL	(Spain) A. Carnero / (Belgium) C. Geens	2	2
2	(Argentina) Chingotto / (Spain) Galán	6	6

Round of 16
1	(Spain) Coello / (Argentina) Tapia	6	6
15	(Spain) A. Ruiz / (Spain) J. Esbri	4	1
13	(Spain) A. Arroyo / (United Arab Emirates) I. Jofre	3	4
5	(Spain) J. Sanz / (Spain) Paquito	6	6
7	(Spain) F. Guerrero / (Spain) Momo	6	6
Q	(Argentina) F. Mouriño / (Argentina) R. Valenzuela	4	4
12	(Spain) J. Garrido / (Brazil) L. Campagnolo	3	0
3	(Spain) Lebrón / (Argentina) Stupaczuk	6	6
23	(Spain) G. Collado / (Spain) P.H. Alvarez	3	5
11	(Spain) J. Barahona / (Spain) J.G. Mora	6	7
Q	(Argentina) J. De Pascual / (Argentina) M. Lamperti	6	5
6	(Argentina) Di Nenno / (Argentina) L. Augsburger	7	7
8	(Spain) J. Leal / (Brazil) L. Bergamini	6	6	4
34	(Argentina) M. Arce / (Spain) P. Lijó	0	7	6
9	(Spain) E. Alonso / (Argentina) J. Tello	4	5
2	(Argentina) Chingotto / (Spain) Galán	6	7

Quarter-Final
1	(Spain) Coello / (Argentina) Tapia	6	6
5	(Spain) J. Sanz / (Spain) Paquito	3	2
7	(Spain) F. Guerrero / (Spain) Momo	3	5
3	(Spain) Lebrón / (Argentina) Stupaczuk	6	7
11	(Spain) J. Barahona / (Spain) J.G. Mora	3	3
6	(Argentina) Di Nenno / (Argentina) L. Augsburger	6	6
34	(Argentina) M. Arce / (Spain) P. Lijó	2	4
2	(Argentina) Chingotto / (Spain) Galán	6	6

Semi-Finals
1	(Spain) Coello / (Argentina) Tapia	6	6
3	(Spain) Lebrón / (Argentina) Stupaczuk	4	3
6	(Argentina) Di Nenno / (Argentina) L. Augsburger	6	4
2	(Argentina) Chingotto / (Spain) Galán	7	6

Finals
1	(Spain) Coello / (Argentina) Tapia	6	3	0
2	(Argentina) Chingotto / (Spain) Galán	2	6	6

=== Women's Bracket ===
Round of 32
1	(Argentina) D. Brea / (Spain) Triay
Bye
17	(Spain) J. Velasco / (Spain) R. Barrera	6	7
21	(Portugal) A. Nogueira / (Spain) M. Merino	4	6
20	(Argentina) J. Bidahorria / (Spain) L. Arruabarrena	6	3
9	(Argentina) A. Osoro / (Spain) V. Iglesias	7	6
WC	(Italy) G. Dal Pozzo / (Spain) S. Bellver	3	0
5	(Spain) M. Ortega / (Spain) T. Icardo	6	6
6	(Spain) A. Alonso / (Argentina) C. Jensen	6	6
23	(Spain) A. Perez / (Spain) M. Borrero	0	0
10	(Spain) B. Caldera / (Spain) C. Goenaga	6	6	6
12	(Spain) J. Castelló / (Spain) L. Rufo	2	7	7
13	(France) A. Collombon / (Spain) A. Martinez	3	5
11	(Spain) L. Sainz / (Spain) P. Llaguno	6	7
Bye
3	(Spain) B. González / (Spain) C. Fernández
4	(Spain) A. Ustero / (Portugal) S. Araújo
Bye
Q	(Spain) J. Cabruja / (Spain) P. Martinez	5	6	4
18	(Spain) L. Martinez / (Spain) N. Rodriguez	7	1	6
Q	(Spain) C. Mesa / (Spain) S. Ruiz	4	2
14	(Spain) M. Barrera / (Spain) M. Caparrós	6	6
15	(Russia) K. Sharifova / (Argentina) V. Riera	3	1
8	(Spain) M. Guinart / (Spain) V. Virseda	6	6
7	(Spain) A. Salazar / (Spain) M. Calvo	6	6
Q	(Italy) G. Marchetti / (France) L. Godallier	1	3
16	(Italy) C. Orsi / (Argentina) M. Goyeneche	5	7	7
22	(Spain) M. Talavan / (Spain) S. Saiz	7	6	6
Q	(Spain) M. Lobo / (Spain) T. Navarro	0	4
19	(Spain) M.R. Abajo / (Spain) N. Canovas	6	6
Bye
2	(Spain) A. Sánchez / (Spain) P. Josemaria

Round of 16
1	(Argentina) D. Brea / (Spain) Triay	6	6
17	(Spain) J. Velasco / (Spain) R. Barrera	2	1
9	(Argentina) A. Osoro / (Spain) V. Iglesias	1	0
5	(Spain) M. Ortega / (Spain) T. Icardo	6	6
5	(Spain) A. Alonso / (Argentina) C. Jensen	6	6
12	(Spain) J. Castelló / (Spain) L. Rufo	2	2
11	(Spain) L. Sainz / (Spain) P. Llaguno	3	6
3	(Spain) B. González / (Spain) C. Fernández	6	6
4	(Spain) A. Ustero / (Portugal) S. Araújo	6	6
18	(Spain) L. Martinez / (Spain) N. Rodriguez	2	2
14	(Spain) M. Barrera / (Spain) M. Caparrós	3	2
8	(Spain) M. Guinart / (Spain) V. Virseda	6	6
7	(Spain) A. Salazar / (Spain) M. Calvo	6	4	6
16	(Italy) C. Orsi / (Argentina) M. Goyeneche	2	6	2
19	(Spain) M.R. Abajo / (Spain) N. Canovas	1	6	3
2	(Spain) A. Sánchez / (Spain) P. Josemaria	6	4	6

Quarter-Final
1	(Argentina) D. Brea / (Spain) Triay	1	6	6
5	(Spain) M. Ortega / (Spain) T. Icardo	6	1	3
5	(Spain) A. Alonso / (Argentina) C. Jensen	6	3
3	(Spain) B. González / (Spain) C. Fernández	7	6
4	(Spain) A. Ustero / (Portugal) S. Araújo	6	6
8	(Spain) M. Guinart / (Spain) V. Virseda	4	3
7	(Spain) A. Salazar / (Spain) M. Calvo	4	4
2	(Spain) A. Sánchez / (Spain) P. Josemaria	6	6

Semi-Finals
1	(Argentina) D. Brea / (Spain) Triay
3	(Spain) B. González / (Spain) C. Fernández	*
4	(Spain) A. Ustero / (Portugal) S. Araújo	3	1
2	(Spain) A. Sánchez / (Spain) P. Josemaria	6	6

Finals
3	(Spain) B. González / (Spain) C. Fernández	2	4
2	(Spain) A. Sánchez / (Spain) P. Josemaria	6	6

== Results ==
=== First Round ===
Men's

Date	Winners	Score	Opponent	Refs.
6/10/2025	(Portugal) Miguel Deus (Portugal) Nuno Deus	6–7 / 7–6 / 6–3	(Italy) Denis Perino (Argentina) Ignacio Piotto	
6/10/2025	(Spain) Daniel Santigosa (Spain) Marc Sintes	4–6 / 6–3 / 6–2	(Italy) Flavio Abbate (Spain) Manuel Castaño	
6/10/2025	(Italy) Facundo Dominguez (Spain) Javier Martinez Vazquez	6–7 / 6–3 / 7–6	(Argentina) Federico Chiostri (Italy) Marco Cassetta	
6/10/2025	(Paraguay) Martin Abud (Spain) Rafael Mendéz	6–2 / 6–0	(Spain) Alfonso Sanchez Arriaga (Italy) Riccardo Sinicropi	
6/10/2025	(Spain) Jose Jimenez Casas (Argentina) Maxi Sanchez Blasco	6–2 / 4–5 / W.O.	(Italy) Aris Patiniotis (Spain) Jesus Moya	
6/10/2025	(Argentina) Federico Mouriño (Argentina) Ramiro Jesus Valenzuela	6–3 / 6–2	(Italy) Lorenzo Di Giovanni (Italy) Simone Cremona	
6/10/2025	(Spain) Mario Del Castillo (Spain) Mario Huete Hernandez	6–3 / 6–4	(Spain) Christian Fuster (Spain) Miguel Solbes	
6/10/2025	(Argentina) Alex Chozas (Spain) David Gala Sanchez	6–4 / 3–6 / 7–6	(Argentina) Agustín Gutiérez (Chile) Javier Valdes	
6/10/2025	(Spain) Guillermo Collado (Spain) Pol Hernandez	7–5 / 6–3	(Spain) Francisco Cabeza (Spain) Teodoro Zapata	
6/10/2025	(Argentina) Eduardo Agustin Torre (Spain) Mario Ortega	2–6 / 7–6 / 6–3	(Spain) Gonzalo Rubio (Spain) Javi Ruiz	
6/10/2025	(Argentina) Juan Ignacio De Pascual (Argentina) Miguel Lamperti	6–1 / 6–4	(Spain) Enrique Goenaga (Spain) Luis Hernandez Quesada	
6/10/2025	(Spain) Emilio Sánchez Chamero (Italy) Enzo Jensen	6–4 / 6–3	(Spain) Alvaro Montiel (Argentina) Juan Cruz Belluati	
6/10/2025	(Spain) Alonso Rodriguez (Argentina) Juan Ignacio Rubini	6–4 / 6–3	(Spain) Diego García (Spain) Jose Luis Gonzalez	
6/10/2025	(Argentina) Maximiliano Arce (Spain) Pablo Lijó	6–3 / 6–7 / 6–2	(Spain) Anton Sans Riola (Spain) Marc Quilez	
6/10/2025	(Spain) Francisco Gil Morales (Argentina) Maxi Sánchez	4–6 / 6–3 / 6–2	(Spain) Pablo García Rodrigo (Spain) Pincho Fernandez	
6/10/2025	(Spain) Alvaro Cepero (Spain) Andres Fernandez Lancha	4–6 / 6–2 / 7–6	(Spain) Alejandro Jerez (Belgium) Clement Geens	

=== Round of 32 ===
Men's

Date	Winners	Score	Opponent	Refs.
8/10/2025	(Argentina) Agustín Tapia (Spain) Arturo Coello	6–3 / 2–1 / W.O.	(Portugal) Miguel Deus (Portugal) Nuno Deus	
8/10/2025	(Spain) Aléx Ruiz (Spain) Juanlu Esbri	7–5 / 7–5	(Spain) Daniel Santigosa (Spain) Marc Sintes	
7/10/2025	(Spain) Alex Arroyo (United Arab Emirates) Iñigo Jofre	6–3 / 7–5	(Italy) Facundo Dominguez (Spain) Javier Martinez Vazquez	
7/10/2025	(Spain) Jon Sanz (Spain) Paquito Navarro	6–2 / 7–5	(Paraguay) Martin Abud (Spain) Rafael Mendéz	
7/10/2025	(Spain) Francisco Guerrero (Spain) Momo Gonzalez	6–3 / 6–3	(Spain) Jose Jimenez Casas (Argentina) Maxi Sanchez Blasco	
7/10/2025	(Argentina) Federico Mouriño (Argentina) Ramiro Jesus Valenzuela	3–6 / 6–1 / 6–3	(Argentina) Gonzalo Alfonso (Argentina) Sanyo Gutiérrez	
8/10/2025	(Spain) Javi Garrido (Brazil) Lucas Campagnolo	7–6 / 6–1	(Spain) Mario Del Castillo (Spain) Mario Huete Hernandez	
8/10/2025	(Argentina) Franco Stupaczuk (Spain) Juan Lebrón	6–3 / 7–5	(Argentina) Alex Chozas (Spain) David Gala Sanchez	
8/10/2025	(Spain) Guillermo Collado (Spain) Pol Hernandez	6–3 / 3–6 / 6–3	(Spain) Coki Nieto (Spain) Mike Yanguas	
8/10/2025	(Spain) Javier Barahona (Spain) Javier García Mora	6–2 / 6–3	(Argentina) Eduardo Agustin Torre (Spain) Mario Ortega	
7/10/2025	(Argentina) Juan Ignacio De Pascual (Argentina) Miguel Lamperti	7–6 / 6–7 / 7–6	(Spain) Jairo Bautista (Argentina) Valentino Libaak	
7/10/2025	(Argentina) Leandro Augsburger (Argentina) Martin Di Nenno	7–6 / 6–2	(Spain) Emilio Sánchez Chamero (Italy) Enzo Jensen	
7/10/2025	(Spain) Javi Leal (Brazil) Lucas Bergamini	6–3 / 6–2	(Spain) Alonso Rodriguez (Argentina) Juan Ignacio Rubini	
7/10/2025	(Argentina) Maximiliano Arce (Spain) Pablo Lijó	6–4 / 6–2	(Spain) Jose García Diestro (Spain) Victor Ruiz	
8/10/2025	(Spain) Eduardo Alonso (Argentina) Juan Tello	6–4 / 6–3	(Spain) Francisco Gil Morales (Argentina) Maxi Sánchez	
8/10/2025	(Spain) Alejandro Galán (Argentina) Federico Chingotto	6–2 / 6–2	(Spain) Alvaro Cepero (Spain) Andres Fernandez Lancha	

Women's

Date	Winners	Score	Opponent	Refs.
7/10/2025	(Spain) Jimena Velasco (Spain) Raquel Eugenio Barrera	6–4 / 7–6	(Portugal) Ana Catarina Nogueira (Spain) Melania Merino	
7/10/2025	(Argentina) Aranzazu Osoro (Spain) Victoria Iglesias	7–6 / 6–3	(Argentina) Julieta Bidahorria (Spain) Lara Arruabarrena	
7/10/2025	(Spain) Marta Ortega (Spain) Tamara Icardo	6–3 / 6–0	(Italy) Giulia Dal Pozzo (Spain) Sandra Bellver	
7/10/2025	(Spain) Alejandra Alonso (Argentina) Claudia Jensen	6–0 / 6–0	(Spain) Agueda Perez (Spain) Marta Borrero	
7/10/2025	(Spain) Jessica Castelló (Spain) Lorena Rufo	2–6 / 7–6 / 7–6	(Spain) Beatriz Caldera (Spain) Carmen Goenaga	
7/10/2025	(Spain) Lucia Sainz (Spain) Patricia Llaguno	6–3 / 7–5	(France) Alix Collombon (Spain) Araceli Martinez	
8/10/2025	(Spain) Lucia Martinez Gomez (Spain) Nuria Rodriguez	7–5 / 1–6 / 6–4	(Spain) Jana Montes (Spain) Patricia Martinez Fortun	
8/10/2025	(Spain) Marta Barrera (Spain) Marta Caparrós	6–4 / 6–2	(Spain) Carla Mesa (Spain) Sara Ruiz Soto	
8/10/2025	(Spain) Marina Guinart (Spain) Verónica Virseda	6–3 / 6–1	(Russia) Ksenia Sharifova (Argentina) Virginia Riera	
8/10/2025	(Spain) Alejandra Salazar (Spain) Martina Calvo	6–1 / 6–3	(Italy) Giorgia Marchetti (France) Lea Godallier	
7/10/2025	(Italy) Carolina Orsi (Argentina) Martina Fassio Goyeneche	5–7 / 7–6 / 7–6	(Spain) Marta Talavan (Spain) Sofía Saiz Vallejo	
8/10/2025	(Spain) Laia Rodriguez Abajo (Spain) Noa Canovas	6–0 / 6–4	(Spain) Marina Martinez Lobo (Spain) Teresa Navarro	

=== Round of 16 ===
Men's

Date	Winners	Score	Opponent	Refs.
9/10/2025	(Argentina) Agustín Tapia (Spain) Arturo Coello	6–4 / 6–1	(Spain) Aléx Ruiz (Spain) Juanlu Esbri	
9/10/2025	(Spain) Jon Sanz (Spain) Paquito Navarro	6–3 / 6–4	(Spain) Alex Arroyo (United Arab Emirates) Iñigo Jofre	
9/10/2025	(Spain) Francisco Guerrero (Spain) Momo Gonzalez	6–4 / 6–4	(Argentina) Federico Mouriño (Argentina) Ramiro Jesus Valenzuela	
9/10/2025	(Argentina) Franco Stupaczuk (Spain) Juan Lebrón	6–3 / 6–0	(Spain) Javi Garrido (Brazil) Lucas Campagnolo	
9/10/2025	(Spain) Javier Barahona (Spain) Javier García Mora	6–3 / 7–5	(Spain) Guillermo Collado (Spain) Pol Hernandez	
9/10/2025	(Argentina) Leandro Augsburger (Argentina) Martin Di Nenno	7–6 / 7–5	(Argentina) Juan Ignacio De Pascual (Argentina) Miguel Lamperti	
9/10/2025	(Argentina) Maximiliano Arce (Spain) Pablo Lijó	0–6 / 7–6 / 6–4	(Spain) Javi Leal (Brazil) Lucas Bergamini	
9/10/2025	(Spain) Alejandro Galán (Argentina) Federico Chingotto	6–4 / 7–5	(Spain) Eduardo Alonso (Argentina) Juan Tello	

Women's

Date	Winners	Score	Opponent	Refs.
9/10/2025	(Argentina) Delfina Brea (Spain) Gemma Triay	6–2 / 6–1	(Spain) Jimena Velasco (Spain) Raquel Eugenio Barrera	
9/10/2025	(Spain) Marta Ortega (Spain) Tamara Icardo	6–1 / 6–0	(Argentina) Aranzazu Osoro (Spain) Victoria Iglesias	
9/10/2025	(Spain) Alejandra Alonso (Argentina) Claudia Jensen	6–2 / 6–2	(Spain) Jessica Castelló (Spain) Lorena Rufo	
9/10/2025	(Spain) Bea González (Spain) Claudia Fernández	6–3 / 7–6	(Spain) Lucia Sainz (Spain) Patricia Llaguno	
9/10/2025	(Spain) Andrea Ustero (Portugal) Sofia Araújo	6–2 / 6–2	(Spain) Lucia Martinez Gomez (Spain) Nuria Rodriguez	
9/10/2025	(Spain) Marina Guinart (Spain) Verónica Virseda	6–3 / 6–2	(Spain) Marta Barrera (Spain) Marta Caparrós	
9/10/2025	(Spain) Alejandra Salazar (Spain) Martina Calvo	6–2 / 4–6 / 6–2	(Italy) Carolina Orsi (Argentina) Martina Fassio Goyeneche	
9/10/2025	(Spain) Ariana Sánchez (Spain) Paula Josemaría	6–1 / 4–6 / 6–3	(Spain) Laia Rodriguez Abajo (Spain) Noa Canovas	

=== Quarter-Finals ===
Men's

Date	Winners	Score	Opponent	Refs.
10/10/2025	(Argentina) Agustín Tapia (Spain) Arturo Coello	6–3 / 6–2	(Spain) Jon Sanz (Spain) Paquito Navarro	
10/10/2025	(Argentina) Franco Stupaczuk (Spain) Juan Lebrón	6–3 / 7–5	(Spain) Francisco Guerrero (Spain) Momo Gonzalez	
10/10/2025	(Argentina) Leandro Augsburger (Argentina) Martin Di Nenno	6–3 / 6–3	(Spain) Javier Barahona (Spain) Javier García Mora	
10/10/2025	(Spain) Alejandro Galán (Argentina) Federico Chingotto	6–2 / 6–4	(Argentina) Maximiliano Arce (Spain) Pablo Lijó	

Women's

Date	Winners	Score	Opponent	Refs.
10/10/2025	(Argentina) Delfina Brea (Spain) Gemma Triay	1–6 / 6–1 / 6–3	(Spain) Marta Ortega (Spain) Tamara Icardo	
10/10/2025	(Spain) Bea González (Spain) Claudia Fernández	7–6 / 6–3	(Spain) Alejandra Alonso (Argentina) Claudia Jensen	
10/10/2025	(Spain) Andrea Ustero (Portugal) Sofia Araújo	6–4 / 6–3	(Spain) Marina Guinart (Spain) Verónica Virseda	
10/10/2025	(Spain) Ariana Sánchez (Spain) Paula Josemaría	6–4 / 6–4	(Spain) Alejandra Salazar (Spain) Martina Calvo	

=== Semi-Finals ===
Men's

Date	Winners	Score	Opponent	Refs.
11/10/2025	(Argentina) Agustín Tapia (Spain) Arturo Coello	6–4 / 6–3	(Argentina) Franco Stupaczuk (Spain) Juan Lebrón	
11/10/2025	(Spain) Alejandro Galán (Argentina) Federico Chingotto	7–6 / 6–4	(Argentina) Leandro Augsburger (Argentina) Martin Di Nenno	

Women's

Date	Winners	Score	Opponent	Refs.
11/10/2025	(Spain) Bea González (Spain) Claudia Fernández	W.O.	(Argentina) Delfina Brea (Spain) Gemma Triay	
11/10/2025	(Spain) Ariana Sánchez (Spain) Paula Josemaría	6–3 / 6–1	(Spain) Andrea Ustero (Portugal) Sofia Araújo	

=== Finals ===
Men's

Date	Winners	Score	Opponent	Refs.
12/10/2025	(Spain) Alejandro Galán (Argentina) Federico Chingotto	2–6 / 6–3 / 6–0	(Argentina) Agustín Tapia (Spain) Arturo Coello	

Women's

Date	Winners	Score	Opponent	Refs.
12/10/2025	(Spain) Ariana Sánchez (Spain) Paula Josemaría	6–2 / 6–4	(Spain) Bea González (Spain) Claudia Fernández	
