= 2025 Brussels P2 =

Padel championships

- Date: 20 – 27 April
- Edition: 2nd
- Category: P2
- Prize money: €252.250
- Location: Brussels, Belgium
- Venue: Tour & Taxis Gare Maritime

Champions
- Men's doubles: (Argentina) Agustín Tapia (Spain) Arturo Coello
- Women's doubles: (Spain) Ariana Sánchez (Spain) Paula Josemaría

Chronology

The 2025 Brussels P2 (officially 2025 Lotto Brussels Premier Padel P2) was the seventh tournament of the fourth season organized by Premier Padel, the premier padel circuit, promoted by the International Padel Federation, and with the financial backing of Nasser Al-Khelaïfi's Qatar Sports Investments.

In the women's category, the two best pairs in the FIP ranking repeated the final for the fifth consecutive tournament. This time, the number 1s Ariana Sánchez and Paula Josemaría managed to defeat Delfina Brea and Gemma Triay, winning their second title of 2025.

In the men's category, the two top-ranked pairs reached the final for the second time, repeating the "Superclásico" for the second time this season. In the final, Agustín Tapia and Arturo Coello defeated Alejandro Galán and Federico Chingotto in three sets, claiming their second consecutive title and their third of 2025.

== Relevant Data ==
=== Continuation of the conflict ===
Although there was no confirmation that the dispute between Premier Padel, the FIP, and the players (PPA) had ended, the athletes who had sat out the last two P2 tournaments, in Gijón and Cancún, registered for and competed in the Brussels tournament.

=== Absence of Stupacuzk ===
Due to Franco Stupaczuk's injury, which forced the pair to miss the Qatar Major, Juan Lebrón registered for the tournament with Alex Ruiz as his temporary partner.

=== Pair changes ===
The Brussels P2 was the final tournament for several partnerships on the women's circuit. Three of the top eight pairs, eliminated in their opening matches, decided to end their partnerships: Marta Ortega and Sofia Araújo (ranked 4th), Andrea Ustero and Alejandra Alonso (6th), and Aranzazu Osoro and Jessica Castelló (8th).

Andrea Ustero and Alejandra Alonso were just a month shy of marking two years together, making them the longest-standing partnership on the elite circuit, trailing only Ariana Sánchez and Paula Josemaría. Ustero would play the upcoming tournaments alongside Sofia Araujo, while Ortega would team up with Alonso.

=== End of Gemma and Delfina's winning streak ===
Leading up to the Brussels final, Gemma Triay and Delfi Brea had racked up a 22-match winning streak and gone 71 days without a loss, remaining undefeated since their semifinal defeat at the season opening tournament in Riyadh. They went on to win titles in Gijón, Cancún, Miami, and Qatar, defeating Ariana and Paula in three of those finals.

=== Coello/Tapia winning streak against Chingotto/Galán ===
With the victory of Agustín Tapia and Arturo Coello in the final against Alejandro Galán and Federico Chingotto, the world number ones secured their ninth consecutive final win over "Chingalán", with their last defeat against them coming in early July of 2024.

Since "Chingalán" joined forces in March 2024, the world's top two pairs faced each other 17 times, always in finals, with the exception of the Seville P2, where they met in the semifinals. Up until the Genoa P2, the number 2 pair held the advantage in the head-to-head record (5–3). However, Coello and Tapia have since gone 296 days without losing to "Chingalán," and with these nine consecutive final victories, they have brought their head-to-head record to 12–5.

== Seeds ==
Male

Rnk.	Team	FIP Ranking Points
1	(Argentina) Agustín Tapia (Spain) Arturo Coello	37860
2	(Spain) Alejandro Galán (Argentina) Federico Chingotto	27400
3	(Spain) Coki Nieto (Spain) Mike Yanguas	14575
4	(Spain) Alejandro Ruiz (Spain) Juan Lebrón	11745
5	(Spain) Jon Sanz (Spain) Momo Gonzalez	10555
6	(Argentina) Juan Tello (Argentina) Martin Di Nenno	10445
7	(Brazil) Lucas Bergamini (Spain) Paquito Navarro	8610
8	(Spain) Javi Garrido (Argentina) Valentino Libaak	6941
9	(Spain) Alejandro Arroyo (Spain) Eduardo Alonso	6827
10	(Argentina) Leandro Augsburguer (Spain) Pablo Cardona	5933
11	(Spain) Francisco Guerrero (Spain) Jairo Bautista	4482
12	(Brazil) Lucas Campagnolo (Argentina) Maxi Sanchéz	3935
13	(Spain) Javier Barahona (Spain) Javier Garcia Mora	3729
14	(Argentina) Gonzalo Alfonso (Argentina) Leonel Aguirre	3120
15	(Argentina) Alex Chozas (Spain) Facundo Dominguez	2810
16	(Spain) Francisco Gil Morales (Spain) Victor Ruiz	2786

Female

Rnk.	Team	FIP Ranking Points
1	(Spain) Ariana Sánchez (Spain) Paula Josemaria	35240
2	(Argentina) Delfina Brea (Spain) Gemma Triay	27240
3	(Spain) Bea González (Spain) Claudia Fernandéz	21600
4	(Spain) Marta Ortega (Portugal) Sofia Araújo	14660
5	(Spain) Lucia Sainz (Spain) Patricia Llaguno	10960
6	(Spain) Alejandra Alonso (Spain) Andrea Ustero	10825
7	(Spain) Alejandra Salazar (Spain) Veronica Virseda	10390
8	(Argentina) Aranzazu Osoro (Spain) Jessica Castello	8915
9	(Argentina) Claudia Jensen (Spain) Tamara Icardo	8750
10	(Spain) Beatriz Caldera (Spain) Carmen Goenaga	4565
11	(Spain) Lorena Rufo (Spain) Lucia Martinez Gomez	4367
12	(Spain) Marina Guinart (Spain) Victoria Iglesias	4289
13	(Spain) Marta Marrero (Argentina) Virginia Riera	4169
14	(Italy) Carolina Orsi (Spain) Nuria Rodriguez	3953
15	(France) Alix Collombon (Spain) Araceli Martinez	3911
16	(Russia) Ksenia Sharifova (Spain) Marta Talavan	3686

== Head-to-head record between teams ranked in the top 4 during the season ==
=== Man's ===
Record	Coello–Tapia	Galán–Chingotto	Lebrón–Stupaczuk	Coki–Yanguas
Coello–Tapia	—	2–0	1–1	2–0
Galán–Chingotto	0–2	—	2–0	2–0
Lebrón–Stupaczuk	1–1	0–2	—	—
Coki–Yanguas	0–2	0–2	—	—

=== Women's ===
Record	Ariana–Paula	D. Brea–Triay	Gonzalez–Fernandez	Araújo–Ortega
Ariana–Paula	—	1–3	4–0	1–1
D. Brea–Triay	3–1	—	1–1	3–0
Gonzalez–Fernandez	0–4	1–1	—	—
Araújo–Ortega	1–1	0–3	—	—

Because the Santiago final ended in a draw, it is not counted.

== Draws ==
=== Men's Bracket ===
Round of 32
1	(Spain) Coello / (Argentina) Tapia	6	6
WC	(Belgium) I. Huysveld / (Belgium) M. Deloyer	2	1
15	(Argentina) A. Chozas / (Italy) F. Dominguez	5	6	1
9	(Spain) A. Arroyo / (Spain) E. Alonso	7	3	6
10	(Argentina) L. Augsburger / (Spain) P. Cardona	7	6
Q	(Spain) A. Sans / (Spain) M. Quilez	5	4
25	(Spain) A. Cepero / (Argentina) E. Torre	1	7	7
8	(Spain) J. Garrido / (Argentina) V. Libaak	6	5	5
7	(Brazil) L. Bergamini / (Spain) Paquito	7	7
24	(Spain) I. Sager / (Argentina) J.C. Belluati	5	5
14	(Argentina) G. Alfonso / (Argentina) L. Aguirre	6	6
WC	(Belgium) C. Geens / (France) T. Leygue	1	0
19	(Spain) G. Rubio / (Spain) P. Lijó	5	2
Q	(Italy) A. Patiniotis / (Spain) D. Sanchez	7	6
12	(Brazil) L. Campagnolo / (Argentina) Maxi	3	4
3	(Spain) Coki / (Spain) Yanguas	6	6
4	(Spain) A. Ruiz / (Spain) J. Lebrón	6	6
Q	(United Arab Emirates) A. Ayats / (Spain) P.G. Rodrigo	2	3
18	(Spain) E. Goenaga / (Spain) T. Zapata	4	6	4
22	(Spain) G. Losada / (Spain) J.G. Diestro	6	0	6
13	(Spain) J. Barahona / (Spain) J.G. Mora	3	6	6
Q	(Spain) P. Alvarez / (Argentina) R. Valenzuela	6	1	4
26	(Spain) J. Martinez / (Spain) M. Benitez	1	1
6	(Argentina) J. Tello / (Argentina) Di Nenno	6	6
5	(Spain) J. Sanz / (Spain) Momo	5	6	6
20	(United Arab Emirates) I. Jofre / (Spain) L.H. Quesada	7	3	3
17	(Spain) J. Esbri / (Spain) S. Oria	5	6
23	(Argentina) F. Mouriño / (Spain) P. Fernandez	7	7
11	(Spain) F. Guerrero / (Spain) J. Bautista	7	6
21	(Spain) D. Sastre / (Spain) J. Ruiz	6	2
16	(Spain) F. Gil / (Spain) V. Ruiz	6	4
2	(Spain) Galán / (Argentina) Chingotto	7	6

Round of 16
1	(Spain) Coello / (Argentina) Tapia	6	6
9	(Spain) A. Arroyo / (Spain) E. Alonso	2	3
10	(Argentina) L. Augsburger / (Spain) P. Cardona	7	6	7
25	(Spain) A. Cepero / (Argentina) E. Torre	5	7	5
7	(Brazil) L. Bergamini / (Spain) Paquito	6	7
14	(Argentina) G. Alfonso / (Argentina) L. Aguirre	1	6
Q	(Italy) A. Patiniotis / (Spain) D. Sanchez	3	3
3	(Spain) Coki / (Spain) Yanguas	6	6
4	(Spain) A. Ruiz / (Spain) J. Lebrón	6	6
22	(Spain) G. Losada / (Spain) J.G. Diestro	3	4
13	(Spain) J. Barahona / (Spain) J.G. Mora	3	2
6	(Argentina) J. Tello / (Argentina) Di Nenno	6	6
5	(Spain) J. Sanz / (Spain) Momo	6	6
23	(Argentina) F. Mouriño / (Spain) P. Fernandez	0	3
11	(Spain) F. Guerrero / (Spain) J. Bautista	0	4
2	(Spain) Galán / (Argentina) Chingotto	6	6

Quarter-Final
1	(Spain) Coello / (Argentina) Tapia	4	6	6
10	(Argentina) L. Augsburger / (Spain) P. Cardona	6	3	4
7	(Brazil) L. Bergamini / (Spain) Paquito	3	7	6
3	(Spain) Coki / (Spain) Yanguas	6	6	3
4	(Spain) A. Ruiz / (Spain) J. Lebrón	3	7	3
6	(Argentina) J. Tello / (Argentina) Di Nenno	6	5	6
5	(Spain) J. Sanz / (Spain) Momo	0	5
2	(Spain) Galán / (Argentina) Chingotto	6	7

Semi-Finals
1	(Spain) Coello / (Argentina) Tapia	6	6
7	(Brazil) L. Bergamini / (Spain) Paquito	4	3
6	(Argentina) J. Tello / (Argentina) Di Nenno	5	5
2	(Spain) Galán / (Argentina) Chingotto	7	7

Finals
1	(Spain) Coello / (Argentina) Tapia	2	6	6
2	(Spain) Galán / (Argentina) Chingotto	6	4	1

=== Women's Bracket ===
Round of 32
1	(Spain) A. Sánchez / (Spain) P. Josemaria
Bye
15	(France) A. Collombon / (Spain) A. Martinez	1	5
14	(Italy) C. Orsi / (Spain) N. Rodriguez	6	7
10	(Spain) B. Caldera / (Spain) C. Goenaga	6	4	0
9	(Argentina) C. Jensen / (Spain) T. Icardo	1	6	6
Bye
6	(Spain) A. Alonso / (Spain) A. Ustero
7	(Spain) A. Salazar / (Spain) V. Virseda
Bye
Q	(Spain) M. Lobo / (Spain) S. Saiz	6	1	*
13	(Spain) M. Marrero / (Argentina) V. Riera	4	1
Q	(Spain) M. Borrero / (Spain) M. Santamaria	6	6	7
16	(Russia) K. Sharifova / (Spain) M. Talavan	2	7	6
Bye
3	(Spain) M. Ortega / (Portugal) S. Araújo
3	(Spain) B. González / (Spain) C. Fernandéz
3	Bye
WC	(Belgium) A.S. Mestach / (Belgium) H. Wyckaert	3	3
Q	(Spain) J. Bautista / (Spain) N. Aguilar	6	6
19	(Spain) B. Las Heras / (Spain) E. Carnicero	6	4	0
Q	(Spain) M.R. Abajo / (Spain) R. Barrera	3	6	6
Bye
8	(Argentina) A. Osoro / (Spain) J. Castelló
5	(Spain) L. Sainz / (Spain) P. Llaguno
Bye
17	(Spain) J. Velasco / (Spain) N. Canovas	7	6
18	(Italy) G. Marchetti / (Spain) S. Ruiz	5	4
11	(Spain) L. Rufo / (Spain) L. Martinez	4	6	6
12	(Spain) M. Guinart / (Spain) V. Iglesias	6	2	3
Bye
2	(Argentina) D. Brea / (Spain) G. Triay

Round of 16
1	(Spain) A. Sánchez / (Spain) P. Josemaria	6	6
14	(Italy) C. Orsi / (Spain) N. Rodriguez	1	2
9	(Argentina) C. Jensen / (Spain) T. Icardo	7	6
6	(Spain) A. Alonso / (Spain) A. Ustero	5	1
7	(Spain) A. Salazar / (Spain) V. Virseda	6	6
Q	(Spain) M. Lobo / (Spain) S. Saiz	2	0
Q	(Spain) M. Borrero / (Spain) M. Santamaria	6	4	6
4	(Spain) M. Ortega / (Portugal) S. Araújo	2	6	1
3	(Spain) B. González / (Spain) C. Fernandéz	6	6
Q	(Spain) J. Bautista / (Spain) N. Aguilar	4	3
Q	(Spain) M.R. Abajo / (Spain) R. Barrera	6	3	6
8	(Argentina) A. Osoro / (Spain) J. Castelló	4	6	3
5	(Spain) L. Sainz / (Spain) P. Llaguno	6	6
17	(Spain) J. Velasco / (Spain) N. Canovas	4	3
11	(Spain) L. Rufo / (Spain) L. Martinez	0	1
2	(Argentina) D. Brea / (Spain) G. Triay	6	6

Quarter-Final
1	(Spain) A. Sánchez / (Spain) P. Josemaria	6	3	6
9	(Argentina) C. Jensen / (Spain) T. Icardo	3	6	4
7	(Spain) A. Salazar / (Spain) V. Virseda	6	6
Q	(Spain) M. Borrero / (Spain) M. Santamaria	2	2
3	(Spain) B. González / (Spain) C. Fernandéz	6	6
Q	(Spain) M.R. Abajo / (Spain) R. Barrera	3	4
5	(Spain) L. Sainz / (Spain) P. Llaguno	2	1
2	(Argentina) D. Brea / (Spain) G. Triay	6	6

Semi-Finals
1	(Spain) A. Sánchez / (Spain) P. Josemaria	6	6
7	(Spain) A. Salazar / (Spain) V. Virseda	3	3
3	(Spain) B. González / (Spain) C. Fernandéz	2	6	5
2	(Argentina) D. Brea / (Spain) G. Triay	6	4	7

Finals
1	(Spain) A. Sánchez / (Spain) P. Josemaria	6	6
2	(Argentina) D. Brea / (Spain) G. Triay	2	4

== Results ==
=== Round of 32 ===
Men's

Date	Winners	Score	Opponent	Refs.
23/4/2025	(Argentina) Agustín Tapia (Spain) Arturo Coello	6–2 / 6–1	(Belgium) Isaac Huysveld (Belgium) Maxime Deloyer	
22/4/2025	(Spain) Alex Arroyo (Spain) Eduardo Alonso	7–5 / 3–6 / 6–1	(Argentina) Alex Chozas (Italy) Facundo Dominguez	
23/4/2025	(Argentina) Leandro Augsburger (Spain) Pablo Cardona	7–5 / 6–4	(Spain) Anton Sans Riola (Spain) Marc Quilez	
22/4/2025	(Spain) Alvero Cepero (Argentina) Eduardo Agustin Torre	1–6 / 7–5 / 7–5	(Spain) Javier Garrido (Argentina) Valentino Libaak	
22/4/2025	(Brazil) Lucas Bergamini (Spain) Paquito Navarro	7–5 / 7–5	(Spain) Ignacio Sager (Argentina) Juan Cruz Belluati	
22/4/2025	(Argentina) Gonzalo Alfonso (Argentina) Leonel Aguirre	6–1 / 6–0	(Belgium) Clement Geens (France) Thomas Leygue	
23/4/2025	(Italy) Aris Patiniotis (Spain) David Gala Sanchez	7–5 / 6–2	(Spain) Gonzalo Rubio (Spain) Pablo Lijó	
23/4/2025	(Spain) Coki Nieto (Spain) Mike Yanguas	6–3 / 6–4	(Brazil) Lucas Campagnolo (Argentina) Maxi Sánchez	
23/4/2025	(Spain) Aléx Ruiz (Spain) Juan Lebrón	6–2 / 6–3	(United Arab Emirates) Arnau Ayats (Spain) Pablo García Rodrigo	
22/4/2025	(Spain) Guillermo Collado (Spain) Jose García Diestro	6–4 / 0–6 / 6–4	(Spain) Enrique Goenaga (Spain) Teodoro Zapata	
23/4/2025	(Spain) Javier García Mora (Spain) Javier Gonzalez Barahona	3–6 / 6–1 / 6–4	(Spain) Pol Hernandez (Argentina) Ramiro Valenzuela	
22/4/2025	(Argentina) Juan Tello (Argentina) Martin Di Nenno	6–1 / 6–1	(Spain) Javier Martinez (Spain) Miguel Benitez	
23/4/2025	(Spain) Jon Sanz (Spain) Momo Gonzalez	5–7 / 6–3 / 6–3	(United Arab Emirates) Iñigo Jofre (Spain) Luis Hernandez Quesada	
22/4/2025	(Argentina) Federico Mouriño (Spain) Pincho Fernandez	7–5 / 7–6	(Spain) Juanlu Esbri (Spain) Salvador Oria	
22/4/2025	(Spain) Francisco Guerrero (Spain) Jairo Bautista	7–6 / 6–2	(Spain) Daniel Santigosa (Spain) Javier Ruiz	
23/4/2025	(Spain) Alejandro Galán (Argentina) Federico Chingotto	7–6 / 6–4	(Spain) Francisco Gil Morales (Spain) Victor Ruiz	

Women's

Date	Winners	Score	Opponent	Refs.
23/4/2025	(Italy) Carolina Orsi (Spain) Nuria Rodriguez	6–1 / 7–5	(France) Alix Collombon (Spain) Araceli Martinez	
23/4/2025	(Argentina) Claudia Jensen (Spain) Tamara Icardo	1–6 / 6–4 / 6–0	(Spain) Beatriz Caldera (Spain) Carmen Goenaga	
23/4/2025	(Spain) Marina Martinez Lobo (Spain) Sofía Saiz Vallejo	6–4 / 1–1 / W.O.	(Spain) Marta Marrero (Argentina) Virginia Riera	
23/4/2025	(Spain) Marta Borrero (Spain) Martina Calvo Santamaria	6–2 / 6–7 / 7–6	(Russia) Ksenia Sharifova (Spain) Marta Talavan	
23/4/2025	(Spain) Noemi Aguilar (Spain) Teresa Navarro	6–3 / 6–3	(Belgium) An-Sophie Mestach (Belgium) Helena Wyckaert	
23/4/2025	(Spain) Laia Rodriguez Abajo (Spain) Raquel Eugenio Barrera	3–6 / 6–4 / 6–0	(Spain) Barbara Las Heras (Spain) Esther Carnicero	
23/4/2025	(Spain) Jimena Velasco (Spain) Noa Canovas	7–5 / 6–4	(Italy) Giorgia Marchetti (Spain) Sara Ruiz	
23/4/2025	(Spain) Lorena Rufo (Spain) Lucia Martinez Gomez	4–6 / 6–2 / 6–3	(Spain) Marina Guinart (Spain) Victoria Iglesias	

=== Round of 16 ===
Men's

Date	Winners	Score	Opponent	Refs.
24/4/2025	(Argentina) Agustín Tapia (Spain) Arturo Coello	6–2 / 6–3	(Spain) Alex Arroyo (Spain) Eduardo Alonso	
24/4/2025	(Argentina) Leandro Augsburger (Spain) Pablo Cardona	7–5 / 6–7 / 7–5	(Spain) Alvero Cepero (Argentina) Eduardo Agustin Torre	
24/4/2025	(Brazil) Lucas Bergamini (Spain) Paquito Navarro	6–1 / 7–6	(Argentina) Gonzalo Alfonso (Argentina) Leonel Aguirre	
24/4/2025	(Spain) Coki Nieto (Spain) Mike Yanguas	6–3 / 6–3	(Italy) Aris Patiniotis (Spain) David Gala Sanchez	
24/4/2025	(Spain) Aléx Ruiz (Spain) Juan Lebrón	6–3 / 6–4	(Spain) Guillermo Collado (Spain) Jose García Diestro	
24/4/2025	(Argentina) Juan Tello (Argentina) Martin Di Nenno	6–3 / 6–2	(Spain) Javier García Mora (Spain) Javier Gonzalez Barahona	
24/4/2025	(Spain) Jon Sanz (Spain) Momo Gonzalez	6–0 / 6–3	(Argentina) Federico Mouriño (Spain) Pincho Fernandez	
24/4/2025	(Spain) Alejandro Galán (Argentina) Federico Chingotto	6–0 / 6–4	(Spain) Francisco Guerrero (Spain) Jairo Bautista	

Women's

Date	Winners	Score	Opponent	Refs.
24/4/2025	(Spain) Ariana Sánchez (Spain) Paula Josemaría	6–1 / 6–2	(Italy) Carolina Orsi (Spain) Nuria Rodriguez	
24/4/2025	(Argentina) Claudia Jensen (Spain) Tamara Icardo	7–5 / 6–1	(Spain) Alejandra Alonso (Spain) Andrea Ustero	
24/4/2025	(Spain) Alejandra Salazar (Spain) Verónica Virseda	6–2 / 6–0	(Spain) Marina Martinez Lobo (Spain) Sofía Saiz Vallejo	
24/4/2025	(Spain) Marta Borrero (Spain) Martina Calvo Santamaria	6–2 / 4–6 / 6–1	(Spain) Marta Ortega (Portugal) Sofia Araújo	
24/4/2025	(Spain) Bea González (Spain) Claudia Fernández	6–4 / 6–3	(Spain) Noemi Aguilar (Spain) Teresa Navarro	
24/4/2025	(Spain) Laia Rodriguez Abajo (Spain) Raquel Eugenio Barrera	6–4 / 3–6 / 6–3	(Argentina) Aranzazu Osoro (Spain) Jessica Castelló	
24/4/2025	(Spain) Lucia Sainz (Spain) Patricia Llaguno	6–4 / 6–3	(Spain) Jimena Velasco (Spain) Noa Canovas	
24/4/2025	(Argentina) Delfina Brea (Spain) Gemma Triay	6–0 / 6–1	(Spain) Lorena Rufo (Spain) Lucia Martinez Gomez	

=== Quarter-Finals ===
Men's

Date	Winners	Score	Opponent	Refs.
25/4/2025	(Argentina) Agustín Tapia (Spain) Arturo Coello	4–6 / 6–3 / 6–4	(Argentina) Leandro Augsburger (Spain) Pablo Cardona	
25/4/2025	(Brazil) Lucas Bergamini (Spain) Paquito Navarro	3–6 / 7–6 / 6–3	(Spain) Coki Nieto (Spain) Mike Yanguas	
25/4/2025	(Argentina) Juan Tello (Argentina) Martin Di Nenno	6–3 / 5–7 / 6–3	(Spain) Aléx Ruiz (Spain) Juan Lebrón	
25/4/2025	(Spain) Alejandro Galán (Argentina) Federico Chingotto	6–0 / 7–5	(Spain) Jon Sanz (Spain) Momo Gonzalez	

Women's

Date	Winners	Score	Opponent	Refs.
25/4/2025	(Spain) Ariana Sánchez (Spain) Paula Josemaría	6–3 / 3–6 / 6–4	(Argentina) Claudia Jensen (Spain) Tamara Icardo	
25/4/2025	(Spain) Alejandra Salazar (Spain) Verónica Virseda	6–2 / 6–2	(Spain) Marta Borrero (Spain) Martina Calvo Santamaria	
25/4/2025	(Spain) Bea González (Spain) Claudia Fernández	6–3 / 6–4	(Spain) Laia Rodriguez Abajo (Spain) Raquel Eugenio Barrera	
25/4/2025	(Argentina) Delfina Brea (Spain) Gemma Triay	6–2 / 6–1	(Spain) Lucia Sainz (Spain) Patricia Llaguno	

=== Semi-Finals ===
Men's

Date	Winners	Score	Opponent	Refs.
26/4/2025	(Argentina) Agustín Tapia (Spain) Arturo Coello	6–4 / 6–3	(Brazil) Lucas Bergamini (Spain) Paquito Navarro	
26/4/2025	(Spain) Alejandro Galán (Argentina) Federico Chingotto	7–5 / 7–5	(Argentina) Juan Tello (Argentina) Martin Di Nenno	

Women's

Date	Winners	Score	Opponent	Refs.
26/4/2025	(Spain) Ariana Sánchez (Spain) Paula Josemaría	6–3 / 6–3	(Spain) Alejandra Salazar (Spain) Verónica Virseda	
26/4/2025	(Argentina) Delfina Brea (Spain) Gemma Triay	6–2 / 4–6 / 7–5	(Spain) Bea González (Spain) Claudia Fernández	

=== Finals ===
Men's

Date	Winners	Score	Opponent	Refs.
27/4/2025	(Argentina) Agustín Tapia (Spain) Arturo Coello	2–6 / 6–4 / 6–1	(Spain) Alejandro Galán (Argentina) Federico Chingotto	

Women's

Date	Winners	Score	Opponent	Refs.
27/4/2025	(Spain) Ariana Sánchez (Spain) Paula Josemaría	6–2 / 6–4	(Argentina) Delfina Brea (Spain) Gemma Triay	
