= 2025 Miami P1 =

Padel championships

- Date: 17 – 23 March
- Edition: 1st
- Category: P1
- Prize money: €474.500
- Location: Miami, United States
- Venue: Miami Beach Convention Center

Champions
- Men's doubles: (Spain) Alejandro Galán (Argentina) Federico Chingotto
- Women's doubles: (Argentina) Delfina Brea (Spain) Gemma Triay

Chronology

The 2025 Miami P1 (officially 2025 Motorola Razr Miami Premier Padel P1) was the fourth tournament of the fourth season organized by Premier Padel, the premier padel circuit, promoted by the International Padel Federation, and with the financial backing of Nasser Al-Khelaïfi's Qatar Sports Investments.

In the women's category, Delfina Brea and Gemma Triay reached their third consecutive final where they would face the FIP's number 1 ranked pair, in a rematch of the Gijón P2 final. However, in a tough three-set match, the number 2 seeds managed to defeat Ariana Sánchez and Paula Josemaría to claim their third consecutive title.

In the men's category, with all players from the FIP top 100 competing in the tournament, Franco Stupaczuk and Juan Lebrón managed to reach their third consecutive final but failed to defeat Alejandro Galán and Federico Chingotto, handing the world number 2 pair their first title of the year.

== Relevant Data ==
=== Top players return ===
Despite the ongoing conflict between players, Premier Padel, and the International Federation (FIP), the top-100 players competed in the Miami P1, fulfilling their contractual obligations.

=== Coello and Tapia out of the finals ===
With Franco Stupaczuk and Juan Lebrón’s victory over Coello and Tapia in the semifinals, the world number ones missed out on the finals, marking the first time in nearly 11 months that they failed to reach the championship match. The last time this had happened was 324 days earlier, when the "Golden Boys" were defeated in the semifinals by "ChinGalán" at the Seville P2 on May 4, 2024.

=== End of the trophy drought ===
After a difficult second half of the previous season in which Alejandro Galán and Federico Chingotto failed to win any tournaments, the Spanish-Argentine duo won the title, dropping only one set throughout the entire event, thereby ending a 259-day drought without lifting a trophy. Their last title had come at the Genoa P2 in July 2024.

=== Delfi and Gemma continue their strong run ===
In the women's category, Delfina Brea and Gemma Triay once again defeated the world number ones, securing their third consecutive title and solidifying their bid for the world number one spot. Their two previous titles had been won in P2 tournaments, making this their first victory at a P1 event.

== Seeds ==
Male

Rnk.	Team	FIP Ranking Points
1	(Argentina) Agustín Tapia (Spain) Arturo Coello	39960
2	(Spain) Alejandro Galán (Argentina) Federico Chingotto	24780
3	(Argentina) Franco Stupaczuk (Spain) Juan Lebrón	16435
4	(Spain) Coki Nieto (Spain) Mike Yanguas	13720
5	(Spain) Javi Garrido (Argentina) Martin Di Nenno	12905
6	(Spain) Jon Sanz (Spain) Momo Gonzalez	10465
7	(Brazil) Lucas Bergamini (Spain) Paquito Navarro	8610
8	(Spain) Alejandro Arroyo (Spain) Eduardo Alonso	7002
9	(Argentina) Leandro Augsburguer (Spain) Pablo Cardona	5685
10	(Argentina) Alex Chozas (Spain) Álex Ruiz	4927
11	(Spain) Javi Leal (Argentina) Sanyo Gutiérrez	4530
12	(Spain) Francisco Guerrero (Spain) Jairo Bautista	4337
13	(Argentina) Juan Tello (Argentina) Valentino Libaak	3978
14	(Brazil) Lucas Campagnolo (Argentina) Maxi Sanchéz	3935
15	(Spain) Javier Barahona (Spain) Javier Garcia Mora	3329
16	(Spain) Javi Ruiz (Spain) Jose Garcia Diestro	2943

Female

Rnk.	Team	FIP Ranking Points
1	(Spain) Ariana Sánchez (Spain) Paula Josemaria	33020
2	(Argentina) Delfina Brea (Spain) Gemma Triay	24260
3	(Spain) Bea González (Spain) Claudia Fernandéz	21380
4	(Spain) Marta Ortega (Portugal) Sofia Araújo	14270
5	(Spain) Lucia Sainz (Spain) Patricia Llaguno	10960
6	(Spain) Alejandra Alonso (Spain) Andrea Ustero	10480
7	(Spain) Alejandra Salazar (Spain) Veronica Virseda	10240
8	(Argentina) Aranzazu Osoro (Spain) Jessica Castello	9530
9	(Argentina) Claudia Jensen (Spain) Tamara Icardo	9380
10	(Spain) Marta Marrero (Argentina) Virginia Riera	4746
11	(Spain) Beatriz Caldera (Spain) Carmen Goenaga	4640
12	(Spain) Marina Guinart (Spain) Victoria Iglesias	3883
13	(Italy) Carolina Orsi (Spain) Nuria Rodriguez	3846
14	(France) Alix Collombon (Spain) Araceli Martinez	3770
15	(Russia) Ksenia Sharifova (Spain) Marta Talavan	3488
16	(Argentina) Julieta Bidahorria (Spain) Lucia Martinez Gomez	3451

== Head-to-head record between teams ranked in the top 4 during the season ==
=== Man's ===
Record	Coello–Tapia	Galán–Chingotto	Lebrón–Stupaczuk	Coki–Yanguas
Coello–Tapia	—	—	1–1	1–0
Galán–Chingotto	—	—	1–0	1–0
Lebrón–Stupaczuk	1–1	0–1	—	—
Coki–Yanguas	0–1	0–1	—	—

=== Women's ===
Record	Ariana–Paula	D. Brea–Triay	Gonzalez–Fernandez	Araújo–Ortega
Ariana–Paula	—	0–2	2–0	1–1
D. Brea–Triay	2–0	—	0–1	3–0
Gonzalez–Fernandez	0–2	1–0	—	—
Araújo–Ortega	1–1	0–3	—	—

== Draws ==
=== Men's Bracket ===
Round of 32
1	(Spain) Coello / (Argentina) Tapia
Bye
20	(Spain) F. Gil / (Spain) V. Ruiz	6	1
15	(Spain) J. Barahona / (Spain) J.G. Mora	7	6
14	(Brazil) L. Campagnolo / (Argentina) Maxi	3	6	7
Q	(Argentina) I. Piotto / (Spain) M. Del Castillo	6	0	5
Q	(Argentina) G. Alfonso / (Argentina) L. Aguirre	6	6	2
7	(Brazil) L. Bergamini / (Spain) Paquito	7	3	6
6	(Spain) J. Sanz / (Spain) Momo	6	6
Q	(Italy) D. Perino / (Spain) M.H. Hernandez	2	4
WC	(United States) N. Agritelley / (United States) V. Di Francesco	2	2
12	(Spain) F. Guerrero / (Spain) J. Bautista	6	6
9	(Argentina) L. Augsburger / (Spain) P. Cardona	7	6
32	(Spain) I. Vilariño / (Spain) J. Munoz	5	4
Bye
3	(Spain) Lebrón / (Argentina) Stupaczuk
4	(Spain) Coki / (Spain) Yanguas
Bye
25	(Argentina) A. Gutiérrez / (Spain) J. Rico	5	3
13	(Argentina) J. Tello / (Argentina) V. Libaak	7	6
11	(Spain) J. Leal / (Argentina) Sanyo	7	6
19	(Spain) G. Rubio / (Spain) P. Lijó	5	2
28	(Spain) J. Martinez / (Spain) M. Benitez	4	6	3
8	(Spain) A. Arroyo / (Spain) E. Alonso	6	4	6
5	(Spain) J. Garrido / (Argentina) Di Nenno	6	6	6
22	(Spain) J. Rico / (Spain) J. Moya	7	4	4
24	(Argentina) F. Mouriño / (Spain) P. Fernandez	2	6	3
16	(Spain) J. Ruiz / (Spain) J.G. Diestro	6	4	6
10	(Argentina) A. Chozas / (Spain) A. Ruiz	7	6	6
26	(Spain) A. Cepero / (Argentina) E. Torre	5	7	2
Bye
2	(Spain) Galán / (Argentina) Chingotto

Round of 16
1	(Spain) Coello / (Argentina) Tapia	6	7
15	(Spain) J. Barahona / (Spain) J.G. Mora	3	5
14	(Brazil) L. Campagnolo / (Argentina) Maxi	3	6
7	(Brazil) L. Bergamini / (Spain) Paquito	6	7
6	(Spain) J. Sanz / (Spain) Momo	5	6	7
12	(Spain) F. Guerrero / (Spain) J. Bautista	7	1	6
9	(Argentina) L. Augsburger / (Spain) P. Cardona	4	4
3	(Spain) Lebrón / (Argentina) Stupaczuk	6	6
4	(Spain) Coki / (Spain) Yanguas	7	6	6
13	(Argentina) J. Tello / (Argentina) V. Libaak	6	7	4
11	(Spain) J. Leal / (Argentina) Sanyo	6	7
8	(Spain) A. Arroyo / (Spain) E. Alonso	3	6
5	(Spain) J. Garrido / (Argentina) Di Nenno	6	6
16	(Spain) J. Ruiz / (Spain) J.G. Diestro	3	0
10	(Argentina) A. Chozas / (Spain) A. Ruiz	1	4
2	(Spain) Galán / (Argentina) Chingotto	6	6

Quarter-Final
1	(Spain) Coello / (Argentina) Tapia	6	7
7	(Brazil) L. Bergamini / (Spain) Paquito	2	5
6	(Spain) J. Sanz / (Spain) Momo	4	6	3
3	(Spain) Lebrón / (Argentina) Stupaczuk	6	3	6
4	(Spain) Coki / (Spain) Yanguas	6	7
11	(Spain) J. Leal / (Argentina) Sanyo	4	6
5	(Spain) J. Garrido / (Argentina) Di Nenno	1	2
2	(Spain) Galán / (Argentina) Chingotto	6	6

Semi-Finals
1	(Spain) Coello / (Argentina) Tapia	4	4
3	(Spain) Lebrón / (Argentina) Stupaczuk	6	6
4	(Spain) Coki / (Spain) Yangua	2	6	6
2	(Spain) Galán / (Argentina) Chingotto	6	4	7

Finals
3	(Spain) Lebrón / (Argentina) Stupaczuk	1	6
2	(Spain) Galán / (Argentina) Chingotto	6	7

=== Women's Bracket ===
Round of 32
1	(Spain) A. Sánchez / (Spain) P. Josemaria
Bye
15	(Russia) K. Sharifova / (Spain) M. Talavan	0	6	6
Q	(Spain) A. Perez / (Spain) M. Merino	6	1	7
21	(Portugal) A. Nogueira / (Argentina) M. Goyeneche	3	7	6
12	(Spain) M. Guinart / (Spain) V. Iglesias	6	6	4
19	(Italy) G. Marchetti / (Spain) S. Ruiz	2	4
6	(Spain) A. Alonso / (Spain) A. Ustero	6	6
7	(Spain) A. Salazar / (Spain) V. Virseda	6	6
WC	(United States) B. Dubins / (United States) M. Alonso	0	0
10	(Spain) M. Marrero / (Argentina) V. Riera	3	6	4
14	(France) A. Collombon / (Spain) A. Martinez	6	4	6
22	(Spain) M. Lobo / (Spain) S. Saiz	2	6	5
Q	(Spain) M.R. Abajo / (Spain) R. Barrera	6	3	7
Bye
3	(Spain) B. González / (Spain) C. Fernandéz
4	(Spain) M. Ortega / (Portugal) S. Araújo
Bye
11	(Spain) B. Caldera / (Spain) C. Goenaga	6	7
18	(Spain) J. Velasco / (Spain) N. Canovas	3	5
16	(Argentina) J. Bidahorria / (Spain) L. Martinez	3	6	3
20	(Spain) B. Las Heras / (Spain) E. Carnicero	6	3	6
Q	(Spain) C. Mesa / (Spain) L. Lujan	3	6
5	(Spain) L. Sainz / (Spain) P. Llaguno	6	7
8	(Argentina) A. Osoro / (Spain) J. Castelló	4	6	6
17	(Spain) L. Arruabarrena / (Spain) L. Rufo	6	3	7
13	(Italy) C. Orsi / (Spain) N. Rodriguez	3	0
9	(Argentina) C. Jensen / (Spain) T. Icardo	6	6
23	(Spain) N. Aguilar / (Spain) T. Navarro	4	3
Q	(Spain) M. Barrera / (Spain) M. Caparrós	6	6
Bye
2	(Argentina) D. Brea / (Spain) G. Triay

Round of 16
1	(Spain) A. Sánchez / (Spain) P. Josemaria	6	6
Q	(Spain) A. Perez / (Spain) M. Merino	1	4
21	(Portugal) A. Nogueira / (Argentina) M. Goyeneche	1	1
6	(Spain) A. Alonso / (Spain) A. Ustero	6	6
7	(Spain) A. Salazar / (Spain) V. Virseda	6	6
14	(France) A. Collombon / (Spain) A. Martinez	3	3
Q	(Spain) M.R. Abajo / (Spain) R. Barrera	5	1
3	(Spain) B. González / (Spain) C. Fernandéz	7	6
4	(Spain) M. Ortega / (Portugal) S. Araújo	6	7
11	(Spain) B. Caldera / (Spain) C. Goenaga	2	5
20	(Spain) B. Las Heras / (Spain) E. Carnicero	3	2
5	(Spain) L. Sainz / (Spain) P. Llaguno	6	6
17	(Spain) L. Arruabarrena / (Spain) L. Rufo	0	1
9	(Argentina) C. Jensen / (Spain) T. Icardo	6	6
Q	(Spain) M. Barrera / (Spain) M. Caparrós	1	6
2	(Argentina) D. Brea / (Spain) G. Triay

Quarter-Final
1	(Spain) A. Sánchez / (Spain) P. Josemaria	6	6
6	(Spain) A. Alonso / (Spain) A. Ustero	4	1
7	(Spain) A. Salazar / (Spain) V. Virseda	2	4
3	(Spain) B. González / (Spain) C. Fernandéz	6	6
4	(Spain) M. Ortega / (Portugal) S. Araújo	6	6
5	(Spain) L. Sainz / (Spain) P. Llaguno	3	2
9	(Argentina) C. Jensen / (Spain) T. Icardo	2	3
2	(Argentina) D. Brea / (Spain) G. Triay	6	6

Semi-Finals
1	(Spain) A. Sánchez / (Spain) P. Josemaria	6	6
3	(Spain) B. González / (Spain) C. Fernandéz	1	4
4	(Spain) M. Ortega / (Portugal) S. Araújo	2	1
2	(Argentina) D. Brea / (Spain) G. Triay	6	6

Finals
1	(Spain) A. Sánchez / (Spain) P. Josemaria	6	1	4
2	(Argentina) D. Brea / (Spain) G. Triay	2	6	6

== Results ==
=== Round of 64 ===
Men's

Date	Winners	Score	Opponent	Refs.
18/3/2025	(Spain) Francisco Gil Morales (Spain) Victor Ruiz	6–3 / 6–2	(Spain) Jose Jimenez Casas (Argentina) Ramiro Moyano	
18/3/2025	(Argentina) Ignacio Piotto (Spain) Mario Del Castillo	6–7 / 6–0 / 7–6	(Spain) Enrique Goenaga (Spain) Teodoro Zapata	
18/3/2025	(Argentina) Gonzalo Alfonso (Argentina) Leonel Aguirre	4–6 / 6–3 / 6–1	(Spain) Emilio Sanchez Chamero (Chile) Javier Valdes	
18/3/2025	(Italy) Denis Perino (Spain) Mario Huete Hernandez	6–4 / 4–6 / 7–6	(Portugal) Miguel Deus (Portugal) Nuno Deus	
18/3/2025	(United States) Nicholas Agritelley (United States) Vinny Nahuel Di Francesco	6–3 / 6–4	(United States) Aaron Segura (United States) Matias Segura	
18/3/2025	(Spain) Ignacio Vilariño (Spain) Jaime Muñoz	6–4 / 5–7 / 6–3	(Spain) Pol Hernandez (Argentina) Ramiro Valenzuela	
18/3/2025	(Argentina) Agustin Gutiérrez (Spain) José Rico	6–3 / 4–6 / 6–4	(United Arab Emirates) Iñigo Jofre (Spain) Luis Hernandez Quesada	
18/3/2025	(Spain) Gonzalo Rubio (Spain) Pablo Lijó	6–3 / 6–0	(Spain) Anton Sans Riola (Spain) Marc Quilez	
18/3/2025	(Spain) Javier Martinez (Spain) Miguel Benitez	4–6 / 7–5 / 6–3	(Spain) Ignacio Sager (Argentina) Juan Cruz Belluati	
18/3/2025	(Spain) Javier Rico (Spain) Jesus Moya	4–6 / 6–4 / 6–4	(United Arab Emirates) Arnau Ayats (Spain) Pablo García Rodrigo	
18/3/2025	(Argentina) Federico Mouriño (Spain) Pincho Fernandez	6–3 / 4–6 / 7–6	(Italy) Aris Patiniotis (Spain) David Gala Sanchez	
18/3/2025	(Spain) Alvero Cepero (Argentina) Eduardo Agustin Torre	7–5 / 6–1	(Spain) Juanlu Esbri (Spain) Salvador Oria	

=== Round of 32 ===
Men's

Date	Winners	Score	Opponent	Refs.
19/3/2025	(Spain) Javier García Mora (Spain) Javier Gonzalez Barahona	7–6 / 6–1	(Spain) Francisco Gil Morales (Spain) Victor Ruiz	
19/3/2025	(Brazil) Lucas Campagnolo (Argentina) Maxi Sánchez	3–6 / 6–0 / 7–5	(Argentina) Ignacio Piotto (Spain) Mario Del Castillo	
19/3/2025	(Brazil) Lucas Bergamini (Spain) Paquito Navarro	7–6 / 3–6 / 6–2	(Argentina) Gonzalo Alfonso (Argentina) Leonel Aguirre	
19/3/2025	(Spain) Jon Sanz (Spain) Momo Gonzalez	6–2 / 6–4	(Italy) Denis Perino (Spain) Mario Huete Hernandez	
19/3/2025	(Spain) Francisco Guerrero (Spain) Jairo Bautista	6–2 / 6–2	(United States) Nicholas Agritelley (United States) Vinny Nahuel Di Francesco	
19/3/2025	(Argentina) Leandro Augsburger (Spain) Pablo Cardona	7–5 / 6–4	(Spain) Ignacio Vilariño (Spain) Jaime Muñoz	
19/3/2025	(Argentina) Juan Tello (Argentina) Valentino Libaak	7–5 / 6–3	(Argentina) Agustin Gutiérrez (Spain) José Rico	
19/3/2025	(Spain) Javier Leal (Argentina) Sanyo Gutiérrez	7–5 / 6–2	(Spain) Gonzalo Rubio (Spain) Pablo Lijó	
19/3/2025	(Spain) Alex Arroyo (Spain) Eduardo Alonso	6–4 / 4–6 / 6–3	(Spain) Javier Martinez (Spain) Miguel Benitez	
19/3/2025	(Spain) Javi Garrido (Argentina) Martin Di Nenno	6–7 / 6–4 / 6–4	(Spain) Javier Rico (Spain) Jesus Moya	
19/3/2025	(Spain) Javi Ruiz (Spain) Jose García Diestro	6–2 / 4–6 / 6–3	(Argentina) Federico Mouriño (Spain) Pincho Fernandez	
19/3/2025	(Argentina) Alex Chozas (Spain) Alex Ruiz	7–5 / 6–7 / 6–2	(Spain) Alvero Cepero (Argentina) Eduardo Agustin Torre	

Women's

Date	Winners	Score	Opponent	Refs.
18/3/2025	(Spain) Agueda Perez (Spain) Melania Merino	6–0 / 1–6 / 7–6	(Russia) Ksenia Sharifova (Spain) Marta Talavan	
18/3/2025	(Portugal) Ana Catarina Nogueira (Argentina) Martina Fassio Goyeneche	3–6 / 7–6 / 6–4	(Spain) Marina Guinart (Spain) Victoria Iglesias	
18/3/2025	(Spain) Alejandra Alonso (Spain) Andrea Ustero	6–2 / 6–4	(Italy) Giorgia Marchetti (Spain) Sara Ruiz	
19/3/2025	(Spain) Alejandra Salazar (Spain) Verónica Virseda	6–0 / 6–0	(United States) Brittany Dubins (United States) Marta Morga Alonso	
19/3/2025	(France) Alix Collombon (Spain) Araceli Martinez	6–3 / 4–6 / 6–4	(Spain) Marta Marrero (Argentina) Virginia Riera	
18/3/2025	(Spain) Laia Rodriguez Abajo (Spain) Raquel Eugenio Barrera	6–2 / 3–6 / 7–5	(Spain) Marina Martinez Lobo (Spain) Sofía Saiz Vallejo	
18/3/2025	(Spain) Beatriz Caldera (Spain) Carmen Goenaga	6–3 / 7–5	(Spain) Jimena Velasco (Spain) Noa Canovas	
19/3/2025	(Spain) Barbara Las Heras (Spain) Esther Carnicero	6–3 / 3–6 / 6–3	(Argentina) Julieta Bidahorria (Spain) Lucia Martinez Gomez	
19/3/2025	(Spain) Lucia Sainz (Spain) Patricia Llaguno	6–3 / 7–6	(Spain) Carla Mesa (Spain) Laura Lujan Rodriguez	
19/3/2025	(Spain) Lara Arruabarrena (Spain) Lorena Rufo	6–4 / 3–6 / 7–6	(Argentina) Aranzazu Osoro (Spain) Jessica Castelló	
19/3/2025	(Argentina) Claudia Jensen (Spain) Tamara Icardo	6–3 / 6–0	(Italy) Carolina Orsi (Spain) Nuria Rodriguez	
18/3/2025	(Spain) Marta Barrera (Spain) Marta Caparrós	6–4 / 6–3	(Spain) Noemi Aguilar (Spain) Teresa Navarro	

=== Round of 16 ===
Men's

Date	Winners	Score	Opponent	Refs.
20/3/2025	(Argentina) Agustín Tapia (Spain) Arturo Coello	6–3 / 7–5	(Spain) Javier García Mora (Spain) Javier Gonzalez Barahona	
20/3/2025	(Brazil) Lucas Bergamini (Spain) Paquito Navarro	6–3 / 7–6	(Brazil) Lucas Campagnolo (Argentina) Maxi Sánchez	
20/3/2025	(Spain) Jon Sanz (Spain) Momo Gonzalez	5–7 / 6–1 / 7–6	(Spain) Francisco Guerrero (Spain) Jairo Bautista	
20/3/2025	(Argentina) Franco Stupaczuk (Spain) Juan Lebrón	6–4 / 6–4	(Argentina) Leandro Augsburger (Spain) Pablo Cardona	
20/3/2025	(Spain) Coki Nieto (Spain) Mike Yanguas	7–6 / 6–7 / 6–4	(Argentina) Juan Tello (Argentina) Valentino Libaak	
20/3/2025	(Spain) Javier Leal (Argentina) Sanyo Gutiérrez	6–3 / 7–6	(Spain) Alex Arroyo (Spain) Eduardo Alonso	
20/3/2025	(Spain) Javi Garrido (Argentina) Martin Di Nenno	6–3 / 6–0	(Spain) Javi Ruiz (Spain) Jose García Diestro	
20/3/2025	(Spain) Alejandro Galán (Argentina) Federico Chingotto	6–1 / 6–4	(Argentina) Alex Chozas (Spain) Alex Ruiz	

Women's

Date	Winners	Score	Opponent	Refs.
20/3/2025	(Spain) Ariana Sánchez (Spain) Paula Josemaría	6–1 / 6–4	(Spain) Agueda Perez (Spain) Melania Merino	
20/3/2025	(Spain) Alejandra Alonso (Spain) Andrea Ustero	6–1 / 6–1	(Portugal) Ana Catarina Nogueira (Argentina) Martina Fassio Goyeneche	
20/3/2025	(Spain) Alejandra Salazar (Spain) Verónica Virseda	6–3 / 6–3	(France) Alix Collombon (Spain) Araceli Martinez	
20/3/2025	(Spain) Bea González (Spain) Claudia Fernández	7–5 / 6–1	(Spain) Laia Rodriguez Abajo (Spain) Raquel Eugenio Barrera	
20/3/2025	(Spain) Marta Ortega (Portugal) Sofia Araújo	6–2 / 7–5	(Spain) Beatriz Caldera (Spain) Carmen Goenaga	
20/3/2025	(Spain) Lucia Sainz (Spain) Patricia Llaguno	6–3 / 6–2	(Spain) Barbara Las Heras (Spain) Esther Carnicero	
20/3/2025	(Argentina) Claudia Jensen (Spain) Tamara Icardo	6–0 / 6–1	(Spain) Lara Arruabarrena (Spain) Lorena Rufo	
20/3/2025	(Argentina) Delfina Brea (Spain) Gemma Triay	6–1 / 7–6	(Spain) Marta Barrera (Spain) Marta Caparrós	

=== Quarter-Finals ===
Men's

Date	Winners	Score	Opponent	Refs.
21/3/2025	(Argentina) Agustín Tapia (Spain) Arturo Coello	6–2 / 7–5	(Brazil) Lucas Bergamini (Spain) Paquito Navarro	
21/3/2025	(Argentina) Franco Stupaczuk (Spain) Juan Lebrón	6–4 / 3–6 / 6–3	(Spain) Jon Sanz (Spain) Momo Gonzalez	
21/3/2025	(Spain) Coki Nieto (Spain) Mike Yanguas	6–4 / 7–6	(Spain) Javier Leal (Argentina) Sanyo Gutiérrez	
21/3/2025	(Spain) Alejandro Galán (Argentina) Federico Chingotto	6–1 / 6–2	(Spain) Javi Garrido (Argentina) Martin Di Nenno	

Women's

Date	Winners	Score	Opponent	Refs.
21/3/2025	(Spain) Ariana Sánchez (Spain) Paula Josemaría	6–4 / 6–1	(Spain) Alejandra Alonso (Spain) Andrea Ustero	
21/3/2025	(Spain) Bea González (Spain) Claudia Fernández	6–2 / 6–4	(Spain) Alejandra Salazar (Spain) Verónica Virseda	
21/3/2025	(Spain) Marta Ortega (Portugal) Sofia Araújo	6–3 / 6–2	(Spain) Lucia Sainz (Spain) Patricia Llaguno	
21/3/2025	(Argentina) Delfina Brea (Spain) Gemma Triay	6–2 / 6–3	(Argentina) Claudia Jensen (Spain) Tamara Icardo	

=== Semi-Finals ===
Men's

Date	Winners	Score	Opponent	Refs.
22/3/2025	(Argentina) Franco Stupaczuk (Spain) Juan Lebrón	6–4 / 6–4	(Argentina) Agustín Tapia (Spain) Arturo Coello	
22/3/2025	(Spain) Alejandro Galán (Argentina) Federico Chingotto	6–2 / 4–6 / 7–6	(Spain) Coki Nieto (Spain) Mike Yanguas	

Women's

Date	Winners	Score	Opponent	Refs.
22/3/2025	(Spain) Ariana Sánchez (Spain) Paula Josemaría	6–1 / 6–4	(Spain) Bea González (Spain) Claudia Fernández	
22/3/2025	(Argentina) Delfina Brea (Spain) Gemma Triay	6–2 / 6–1	(Spain) Marta Ortega (Portugal) Sofia Araújo	

=== Finals ===
Men's

Date	Winners	Score	Opponent	Refs.
23/3/2025	(Spain) Alejandro Galán (Argentina) Federico Chingotto	6–1 / 7–6	(Argentina) Franco Stupaczuk (Spain) Juan Lebrón	

Women's

Date	Winners	Score	Opponent	Refs.
23/3/2025	(Argentina) Delfina Brea (Spain) Gemma Triay	2–6 / 6–1 / 6–4	(Spain) Ariana Sánchez (Spain) Paula Josemaría	
