= 2025 Qatar Major =

Padel championships

- Date: 11 – 19 April
- Edition: 4th
- Category: Major
- Prize money: €532.900
- Location: Doha, Qatar
- Venue: Khalifa International Tennis and Squash Complex

Champions
- Men's doubles: (Argentina) Agustín Tapia (Spain) Arturo Coello
- Women's doubles: (Argentina) Delfina Brea (Spain) Gemma Triay

Chronology

The 2025 Qatar Major (officially 2025 Qatar Major Premier Padel) was the sixth tournament of the fourth season organized by Premier Padel, the premier padel circuit, promoted by the International Padel Federation, and with the financial backing of Nasser Al-Khelaïfi's Qatar Sports Investments.

In the women's category, the top two pairs in the FIP rankings reached the finals for the fourth time in the last five tournaments, but this time there would be a winner unlike in Santiago. The decisive match pitted Ariana Sánchez and Paula Josemaría against Delfina Brea and Gemma Triay, with the number two seeds winning in straight sets to claim their fourth consecutive title.

In the men's category, the top two ranked pairs both reached the finals for the first time, setting up the season's first 'SuperClásico'. In the decisive match, Agustín Tapia and Arturo Coello defeated Alejandro Galán and Federico Chingotto in straight sets to claim their second title of 2025.

== Relevant Data ==
=== Lebrón and Stupaczuk out ===
Due to physical issues affecting Franco Stupaczuk, the Argentine and Juan Lebrón did not compete in the tournament. Although fit and registered, Juan Lebrón was unable to find a partner in time, thus missing the event.

=== Gemma reduces the gap to the number 1s ===
With Delfina Brea and Gemma Triay victory in the finals, Triay reduced the points gap to just 560 points behind the world number ones, Ariana Sánchez and Paula Josemaría, in the FIP ranking.

== Seeds ==
Male

Rnk.	Team	FIP Ranking Points
1	(Argentina) Agustín Tapia (Spain) Arturo Coello	37860
2	(Spain) Alejandro Galán (Argentina) Federico Chingotto	27400
3	(Argentina) Franco Stupaczuk (Spain) Juan Lebrón	18670
4	(Spain) Coki Nieto (Spain) Mike Yanguas	14575
5	(Spain) Javi Garrido (Argentina) Martin Di Nenno	12680
6	(Spain) Jon Sanz (Spain) Momo Gonzalez	10555
7	(Brazil) Lucas Bergamini (Spain) Paquito Navarro	8610
8	(Spain) Alejandro Arroyo (Spain) Eduardo Alonso	6827
9	(Argentina) Leandro Augsburguer (Spain) Pablo Cardona	5933
10	(Argentina) Alex Chozas (Spain) Álex Ruiz	5112
11	(Argentina) Juan Tello (Argentina) Valentino Libaak	4706
12	(Spain) Javi Leal (Argentina) Sanyo Gutiérrez	4535
13	(Spain) Francisco Guerrero (Spain) Jairo Bautista	4482
14	(Brazil) Lucas Campagnolo (Argentina) Maxi Sanchéz	3935
15	(Spain) Javier Barahona (Spain) Javier Garcia Mora	3614
16	(Argentina) Gonzalo Alfonso (Argentina) Leonel Daniel Aguirre	3120

Female

Rnk.	Team	FIP Ranking Points
1	(Spain) Ariana Sánchez (Spain) Paula Josemaria	35240
2	(Argentina) Delfina Brea (Spain) Gemma Triay	27240
3	(Spain) Bea González (Spain) Claudia Fernandéz	21600
4	(Spain) Marta Ortega (Portugal) Sofia Araújo	14660
5	(Spain) Lucia Sainz (Spain) Patricia Llaguno	10960
6	(Spain) Alejandra Alonso (Spain) Andrea Ustero	10825
7	(Spain) Alejandra Salazar (Spain) Veronica Virseda	10390
8	(Argentina) Aranzazu Osoro (Spain) Jessica Castello	8915
9	(Argentina) Claudia Jensen (Spain) Tamara Icardo	8750
10	(Spain) Beatriz Caldera (Spain) Carmen Goenaga	4565
11	(Spain) Lorena Rufo (Spain) Lucia Martinez Gomez	4367
12	(Spain) Marina Guinart (Spain) Victoria Iglesias	4289
13	(Spain) Marta Marrero (Argentina) Virginia Riera	4169
14	(Italy) Carolina Orsi (Spain) Nuria Rodriguez	3953
15	(France) Alix Collombon (Spain) Araceli Martinez	3911
16	(Russia) Ksenia Sharifova (Spain) Marta Talavan	3568

== Head-to-head record between teams ranked in the top 4 during the season ==
=== Man's ===
Record	Coello–Tapia	Galán–Chingotto	Lebrón–Stupaczuk	Coki–Yanguas
Coello–Tapia	—	1–0	1–1	2–0
Galán–Chingotto	0–1	—	2–0	2–0
Lebrón–Stupaczuk	1–1	0–2	—	—
Coki–Yanguas	0–2	0–2	—	—

=== Women's ===
Record	Ariana–Paula	D. Brea–Triay	Gonzalez–Fernandez	Araújo–Ortega
Ariana–Paula	—	0–3	4–0	1–1
D. Brea–Triay	3–0	—	0–1	3–0
Gonzalez–Fernandez	0–4	1–0	—	—
Araújo–Ortega	1–1	0–3	—	—

Because the Santiago final ended in a draw, it is not counted.

== Draws ==
=== Men's Bracket ===
Round of 32
1	(Spain) Coello / (Argentina) Tapia	6	6
21	(Spain) G. Rubio / (Spain) P. Lijó	4	2
24	(Spain) I. Sager / (Argentina) J.C. Belluati	7	2	6
14	(Spain) J. Barahona / (Spain) J.G. Mora	6	6	0
15	(Argentina) G. Alfonso / (Argentina) L. Aguirre	6	4
28	(Portugal) M. Deus / (Portugal) N. Deus	7	6
29	(Spain) J.J. Casas / (Argentina) R. Moyano	3	5
8	(Argentina) L. Augsburger / (Spain) P. Cardona	6	7
5	(Spain) J. Sanz / (Spain) Momo	6	6	6
33	(Spain) A. Sans / (Spain) M. Quilez	7	1	0
35	(Italy) A. Patiniotis / (Spain) D. Sanchez	6	7
10	(Argentina) J. Tello / (Argentina) V. Libaak	2	6
16	(Spain) J. Ruiz / (Spain) J.G. Diestro	4	5
37	(Argentina) I. Piotto / (Spain) M. Del Castillo	6	7
34	(Spain) P. Alvarez / (Argentina) R. Valenzuela	6	4
3	(Spain) Coki / (Spain) Yanguas	7	6
4	(Spain) J. Garrido / (Argentina) Di Nenno	6	6
30	(Spain) E. Chamero / (Chile) J. Valdes	3	2
Q	(Spain) R. Mendéz / (Spain) T. Bueno	1	3
12	(Spain) F. Guerrero / (Spain) J. Bautista	6	6
11	(Spain) J. Leal / (Argentina) Sanyo	3	6	2
17	(Spain) F. Gil / (Spain) V. Ruiz	6	4	6
36	(United Arab Emirates) A. Ayats / (Spain) P.G. Rodrigo	3	4
6	(Brazil) L. Bergamini / (Spain) Paquito	6	6
7	(Spain) A. Arroyo / (Spain) E. Alonso	6	6
40	(Spain) C. Marti / (Spain) M. Ortega	4	3
Q	(Belgium) C. Geens / (France) T. Leygue	2	4
9	(Argentina) A. Chozas / (Spain) A. Ruiz	6	6
13	(Brazil) L. Campagnolo / (Argentina) Maxi	6	6
20	(United Arab Emirates) I. Jofre / (Spain) L.H. Quesada	3	4
25	(Spain) A. Cepero / (Argentina) E. Torre	1	1
2	(Spain) Galán / (Argentina) Chingotto	6	6

Round of 16
1	(Spain) Coello / (Argentina) Tapia	6	6
24	(Spain) I. Sager / (Argentina) J.C. Belluati	2	4
28	(Portugal) M. Deus / (Portugal) N. Deus	4	3
8	(Argentina) L. Augsburger / (Spain) P. Cardona	6	6
5	(Spain) J. Sanz / (Spain) Momo	6	6
35	(Italy) A. Patiniotis / (Spain) D. Sanchez	3	4
37	(Argentina) I. Piotto / (Spain) M. Del Castillo	0	0
3	(Spain) Coki / (Spain) Yanguas	6	6
4	(Spain) J. Garrido / (Argentina) Di Nenno	7	1	6
12	(Spain) F. Guerrero / (Spain) J. Bautista	6	6	1
17	(Spain) F. Gil / (Spain) V. Ruiz	1	0
6	(Brazil) L. Bergamini / (Spain) Paquito	6	6
7	(Spain) A. Arroyo / (Spain) E. Alonso	3	6	6
9	(Argentina) A. Chozas / (Spain) A. Ruiz	6	3	4
13	(Brazil) L. Campagnolo / (Argentina) Maxi	5	3
2	(Spain) Galán / (Argentina) Chingotto	7	6

Quarter-Final
1	(Spain) Coello / (Argentina) Tapia	6	6
8	(Argentina) L. Augsburger / (Spain) P. Cardona	4	4
5	(Spain) J. Sanz / (Spain) Momo	6	6	5
3	(Spain) Coki / (Spain) Yanguas	7	4	7
4	(Spain) J. Garrido / (Argentina) Di Nenno	4	6	3
6	(Brazil) L. Bergamini / (Spain) Paquito	6	4	6
7	(Spain) A. Arroyo / (Spain) E. Alonso	1	4
2	(Spain) Galán / (Argentina) Chingotto	6	6

Semi-Finals
1	(Spain) Coello / (Argentina) Tapia	6	7
3	(Spain) Coki / (Spain) Yanguas	2	5
6	(Brazil) L. Bergamini / (Spain) Paquito	3	5
2	(Spain) Galán / (Argentina) Chingotto	6	7

Finals
1	(Spain) Coello / (Argentina) Tapia	7	6
2	(Spain) Galán / (Argentina) Chingotto	6	2

=== Women's Bracket ===
Round of 32
1	(Spain) A. Sánchez / (Spain) P. Josemaria
Bye
23	(Portugal) A. Nogueira / (Argentina) M. Goyeneche	2	0
16	(Russia) K. Sharifova / (Spain) M. Talavan	6	6
9	(Argentina) C. Jensen / (Spain) T. Icardo	7	6
22	(Spain) M. Lobo / (Spain) S. Saiz	3	5
27	(Spain) A. Perez / (Spain) M. Merino	6	6
8	(Argentina) A. Osoro / (Spain) J. Castelló	3	4
5	(Spain) L. Sainz / (Spain) P. Llaguno	7	7
17	(Spain) J. Velasco / (Spain) N. Canovas	6	5
30	(Spain) M. Borrero / (Spain) M. Santamaria	7	6
11	(Spain) L. Arruabarrena / (Spain) L. Rufo	6	3
13	(Spain) M. Marrero / (Argentina) V. Riera	6	3
21	(Spain) M. Barrera / (Spain) M. Caparrós	7	6
Bye
3	(Spain) B. González / (Spain) C. Fernandéz
4	(Spain) M. Ortega / (Portugal) S. Araújo
Bye
24	(Spain) M.R. Abajo / (Spain) R. Barrera	4	6
15	(France) A. Collombon / (Spain) A. Martinez	6	7
14	(Italy) C. Orsi / (Spain) N. Rodriguez	6	6
31	(Spain) L. Manquillo / (Spain) P. Martinez	1	3
32	(Spain) A. Soriano / (Spain) M. Arellano	1	0
7	(Spain) A. Salazar / (Spain) V. Virseda	6	6
6	(Spain) A. Alonso / (Spain) A. Ustero	6	6
18	(Italy) G. Marchetti / (Spain) S. Ruiz	3	2
28	(France) L. Godallier / (Spain) S. Bellver	3	5
10	(Spain) B. Caldera / (Spain) C. Goenaga	6	7
12	(Spain) M. Guinart / (Spain) V. Iglesias	3	6	6
19	(Spain) B. Las Heras / (Spain) E. Carnicero	6	1	3
Bye
2	(Argentina) D. Brea / (Spain) G. Triay

Round of 16
1	(Spain) A. Sánchez / (Spain) P. Josemaria	6	6
16	(Russia) K. Sharifova / (Spain) M. Talavan	0	0
9	(Argentina) C. Jensen / (Spain) T. Icardo	6	6
27	(Spain) A. Perez / (Spain) M. Merino	2	4
5	(Spain) L. Sainz / (Spain) P. Llaguno	6	1	5
30	(Spain) M. Borrero / (Spain) M. Santamaria	2	6	0
21	(Spain) M. Barrera / (Spain) M. Caparrós	1	5
3	(Spain) B. González / (Spain) C. Fernandéz	6	7
4	(Spain) M. Ortega / (Portugal) S. Araújo	6	5	*
15	(France) A. Collombon / (Spain) A. Martinez	2	2
14	(Italy) C. Orsi / (Spain) N. Rodriguez	6	3	5
7	(Spain) A. Salazar / (Spain) V. Virseda	1	6	7
6	(Spain) A. Alonso / (Spain) A. Ustero	2	2
10	(Spain) B. Caldera / (Spain) C. Goenaga	6	6
12	(Spain) M. Guinart / (Spain) V. Iglesias	6	4	1
2	(Argentina) D. Brea / (Spain) G. Triay	2	6	6

Quarter-Final
1	(Spain) A. Sánchez / (Spain) P. Josemaria	7	6
9	(Argentina) C. Jensen / (Spain) T. Icardo	5	1
5	(Spain) L. Sainz / (Spain) P. Llaguno	3	3
3	(Spain) B. González / (Spain) C. Fernandéz	6	6
4	(Spain) M. Ortega / (Portugal) S. Araújo	6	2	4
7	(Spain) A. Salazar / (Spain) V. Virseda	2	6	6
10	(Spain) B. Caldera / (Spain) C. Goenaga	2	5
2	(Argentina) D. Brea / (Spain) G. Triay	6	7

Semi-Finals
1	(Spain) A. Sánchez / (Spain) P. Josemaria	6	5	6
3	(Spain) B. González / (Spain) C. Fernandéz	2	7	4
7	(Spain) A. Salazar / (Spain) V. Virseda	0	7	1
2	(Argentina) D. Brea / (Spain) G. Triay	6	6	6

Finals
1	(Spain) A. Sánchez / (Spain) P. Josemaria	4	4
2	(Argentina) D. Brea / (Spain) G. Triay	6	6

== Results ==
=== First Round ===
Men's

Date	Winners	Score	Opponent	Refs.
14/4/2025	(Spain) Gonzalo Rubio (Spain) Pablo Lijó	6–3 / 6–2	(Spain) Ignacio Vilariño (Spain) Jaime Muñoz	
14/4/2025	(Spain) Ignacio Sager (Argentina) Juan Cruz Belluati	7–6 / 5–7 / 7–6	(Argentina) Agustin Gutiérrez (Spain) José Rico	
14/4/2025	(Portugal) Miguel Deus (Portugal) Nuno Deus	6–3 / 6–4	(Argentina) Juan Ignacio Rubini (Argentina) Miguel Lamperti	
14/4/2025	(Spain) Jose Jimenez Casas (Argentina) Ramiro Moyano	6–4 / 6–4	(Spain) Daniel Santigosa (Spain) Guillermo Collado	
14/4/2025	(Spain) Anton Sans Riola (Spain) Marc Quilez	6–0 / 6–0	(Qatar) Abdulla Alhijji (Qatar) Rayan Abdulla	
14/4/2025	(Italy) Aris Patiniotis (Spain) David Gala Sanchez	6–4 / 6–2	(Argentina) Federico Mouriño (Spain) Pincho Fernandez	
14/4/2025	(Argentina) Ignacio Piotto (Spain) Mario Del Castillo	6–1 / 6–2	(Qatar) Hassan Adel Waly (Qatar) Mohammed Saadon Alkuwari	
14/4/2025	(Spain) Pol Hernandez (Argentina) Ramiro Valenzuela	6–0 / 3–0 / W.O.	(Spain) Javi Rico (Spain) Jesus Moya	
14/4/2025	(Spain) Emilio Sanchez Chamero (Chile) Javier Valdes	6–1 / 7–5	(Spain) Diego Gil Batista (Spain) Victor Mena Gil	
14/4/2025	(Spain) Rafael Mendéz (Spain) Toni Bueno	6–4 / 6–4	(Spain) Enrique Goenaga (Spain) Teodoro Zapata	
14/4/2025	(Spain) Francisco Gil Morales (Spain) Victor Ruiz	6–3 / 4–6 / 6–3	(Spain) Juanlu Esbri (Spain) Salvador Oria	
14/4/2025	(United Arab Emirates) Arnau Ayats (Spain) Pablo García Rodrigo	6–2 / 6–4	(Spain) Diego García (Spain) Francisco Cabeza	
14/4/2025	(Spain) Carlos Marti (Spain) Mario Ortega	6–7 / 6–0 / 6–3	(Qatar) Mashari Nawaf (Qatar) Rashed Nawaf	
14/4/2025	(Belgium) Clement Geens (Sweden) Thomas Leygue	7–6 / 6–2	(Italy) Denis Perino (Spain) Mario Huete	
14/4/2025	(United Arab Emirates) Iñigo Jofre (Spain) Luis Hernandez Quesada	6–4 / 7–5	(Spain) Javier Martinez (Spain) Miguel Benitez	
14/4/2025	(Spain) Alvero Cepero (Argentina) Eduardo Agustin Torre	5–7 / 6–4 / 6–3	(Spain) Alvaro Melendez Amaya (Italy) Facundo Dominguez	

Women's

Date	Winners	Score	Opponent	Refs.
14/4/2025	(Portugal) Ana Catarina Nogueira (Argentina) Martina Fassio Goyeneche	7–5 / 6–4	(Spain) Ariadna Cañellas (Spain) Lucía Peralta	
14/4/2025	(Spain) Marina Martinez Lobo (Spain) Sofía Saiz Vallejo	6–2 / 2–6 / 6–2	(Argentina) Daiara Valenzuela (Spain) Sara Pujals	
14/4/2025	(Spain) Agueda Perez (Spain) Melania Merino	7–6 / 6–2	(Spain) Lara Arruabarrena (Argentina) Julieta Bidahorria	
14/4/2025	(Spain) Jimena Velasco (Spain) Noa Canovas	6–4 / 6–4	(Spain) Noemi Aguilar (Spain) Teresa Navarro	
14/4/2025	(Spain) Marta Borrero (Spain) Martina Calvo Santamaria	7–6 / 6–7 / 6–3	(Spain) Aida Martinez; Natividad Lopez Díaz	
14/4/2025	(Spain) Marta Barrera (Spain) Marta Caparrós	6–4 / 6–3	(Spain) Carmen Castillon (Sweden) Carolina Navarro Björk	
14/4/2025	(Spain) Laia Rodriguez Abajo (Spain) Raquel Eugenio Barrera	6–2 / 6–1	(Egypt) Laila El Nimr (Egypt) Moura Hakim	
14/4/2025	(Spain) Letizia María Manquillo (Spain) Patricia Martinez Fortun	7–6 / 2–6 / 6–4	(Spain) Carla Mesa (Spain) Laura Lujan Rodriguez	
14/4/2025	(Spain) Arantxa Soriano (Spain) Marta Arellano	6–0 / 6–1	(Oman) Fatma Al Nabhani (Spain) María Portillo	
14/4/2025	(Italy) Giorgia Marchetti (Spain) Sara Ruiz	1–6 / 6–3 / 6–1	(Spain) Jana Montes (Spain) Julia Polo Bautista	
14/4/2025	(France) Lea Godallier (Spain) Sandra Bellver	4–6 / 6–3 / 6–2	(Spain) Alba Gallardo (Italy) Carlotta Casali	
14/4/2025	(Spain) Barbara Las Heras (Spain) Esther Carnicero	6–2 / 6–4	(Spain) Alicia Blanco Rojo (Spain) Rebeca Lopez	

=== Round of 32 ===
Men's

Date	Winners	Score	Opponent	Refs.
15/4/2025	(Argentina) Agustín Tapia (Spain) Arturo Coello	6–4 / 6–2	(Spain) Gonzalo Rubio (Spain) Pablo Lijó	
15/4/2025	(Spain) Ignacio Sager (Argentina) Juan Cruz Belluati	7–6 / 2–6 / 6–0	(Spain) Javier García Mora (Spain) Javier Gonzalez Barahona	
15/4/2025	(Portugal) Miguel Deus (Portugal) Nuno Deus	7–6 / 6–4	(Argentina) Gonzalo Alfonso (Argentina) Leonel Aguirre	
15/4/2025	(Argentina) Leandro Augsburger (Spain) Pablo Cardona	6–3 / 7–5	(Spain) Jose Jimenez Casas (Argentina) Ramiro Moyano	
15/4/2025	(Spain) Jon Sanz (Spain) Momo Gonzalez	6–7 / 6–1 / 6–0	(Spain) Anton Sans Riola (Spain) Marc Quilez	
15/4/2025	(Italy) Aris Patiniotis (Spain) David Gala Sanchez	6–2 / 7–6	(Argentina) Juan Tello (Argentina) Valentino Libaak	
15/4/2025	(Argentina) Ignacio Piotto (Spain) Mario Del Castillo	6–4 / 7–5	(Spain) Javi Ruiz (Spain) Jose García Diestro	
15/4/2025	(Spain) Coki Nieto (Spain) Mike Yanguas	7–6 / 6–4	(Spain) Pol Hernandez (Argentina) Ramiro Valenzuela	
15/4/2025	(Spain) Javi Garrido (Argentina) Martin Di Nenno	6–3 / 6–2	(Spain) Emilio Sanchez Chamero (Chile) Javier Valdes	
15/4/2025	(Spain) Francisco Guerrero (Spain) Jairo Bautista	6–1 / 6–3	(Spain) Rafael Mendéz (Spain) Toni Bueno	
15/4/2025	(Spain) Francisco Gil Morales (Spain) Victor Ruiz	6–3 / 4–6 / 6–2	(Spain) Javier Leal (Argentina) Sanyo Gutiérrez	
15/4/2025	(Brazil) Lucas Bergamini (Spain) Paquito Navarro	6–3 / 6–4	(United Arab Emirates) Arnau Ayats (Spain) Pablo García Rodrigo	
15/4/2025	(Spain) Alex Arroyo (Spain) Eduardo Alonso	6–4 / 6–3	(Spain) Carlos Marti (Spain) Mario Ortega	
15/4/2025	(Argentina) Alex Chozas (Spain) Alex Ruiz	6–2 / 6–4	(Belgium) Clement Geens (France) Thomas Leygue	
15/4/2025	(Brazil) Lucas Campagnolo (Argentina) Maxi Sánchez	6–3 / 6–4	(United Arab Emirates) Iñigo Jofre (Spain) Luis Hernandez Quesada	
15/4/2025	(Spain) Alejandro Galán (Argentina) Federico Chingotto	6–1 / 6–1	(Spain) Alvero Cepero (Argentina) Eduardo Agustin Torre	

Women's

Date	Winners	Score	Opponent	Refs.
15/4/2025	(Russia) Ksenia Sharifova (Spain) Marta Talavan	6–2 / 6–0	(Portugal) Ana Catarina Nogueira (Argentina) Martina Fassio Goyeneche	
15/4/2025	(Argentina) Claudia Jensen (Spain) Tamara Icardo	6–3 / 7–5	(Spain) Marina Martinez Lobo (Spain) Sofía Saiz Vallejo	
15/4/2025	(Spain) Agueda Perez (Spain) Melania Merino	6–3 / 6–4	(Argentina) Aranzazu Osoro (Spain) Jessica Castelló	
15/4/2025	(Spain) Lucia Sainz (Spain) Patricia Llaguno	7–6 / 7–5	(Spain) Jimena Velasco (Spain) Noa Canovas	
15/4/2025	(Spain) Marta Borrero (Spain) Martina Calvo Santamaria	7–6 / 6–3	(Spain) Lorena Rufo (Spain) Lucia Martinez Gomez	
15/4/2025	(Spain) Marta Barrera (Spain) Marta Caparrós	7–6 / 6–3	(Spain) Marta Marrero (Argentina) Virginia Riera	
15/4/2025	(France) Alix Collombon (Spain) Araceli Martinez	6–4 / 7–6	(Spain) Laia Rodriguez Abajo (Spain) Raquel Eugenio Barrera	
15/4/2025	(Italy) Carolina Orsi (Spain) Nuria Rodriguez	6–1 / 6–3	(Spain) Letizia María Manquillo (Spain) Patricia Martinez Fortun	
15/4/2025	(Spain) Alejandra Salazar (Spain) Verónica Virseda	6–1 / 6–0	(Spain) Arantxa Soriano (Spain) Marta Arellano	
15/4/2025	(Spain) Alejandra Alonso (Spain) Andrea Ustero	6–3 / 6–2	(Italy) Giorgia Marchetti (Spain) Sara Ruiz	
15/4/2025	(Spain) Beatriz Caldera (Spain) Carmen Goenaga	6–3 / 7–5	(France) Lea Godallier (Spain) Sandra Bellver	
15/4/2025	(Spain) Marina Guinart (Spain) Victoria Iglesias	3–6 / 6–1 / 6–3	(Spain) Barbara Las Heras (Spain) Esther Carnicero	

=== Round of 16 ===
Men's

Date	Winners	Score	Opponent	Refs.
16/4/2025	(Argentina) Agustín Tapia (Spain) Arturo Coello	6–2 / 6–4	(Spain) Ignacio Sager (Argentina) Juan Cruz Belluati	
16/4/2025	(Argentina) Leandro Augsburger (Spain) Pablo Cardona	6–4 / 6–3	(Portugal) Miguel Deus (Portugal) Nuno Deus	
16/4/2025	(Spain) Jon Sanz (Spain) Momo Gonzalez	6–3 / 6–4	(Italy) Aris Patiniotis (Spain) David Gala Sanchez	
16/4/2025	(Spain) Coki Nieto (Spain) Mike Yanguas	6–0 / 6–0	(Argentina) Ignacio Piotto (Spain) Mario Del Castillo	
16/4/2025	(Spain) Javi Garrido (Argentina) Martin Di Nenno	7–6 / 1–6 / 6–1	(Spain) Francisco Guerrero (Spain) Jairo Bautista	
16/4/2025	(Brazil) Lucas Bergamini (Spain) Paquito Navarro	6–1 / 6–0	(Spain) Francisco Gil Morales (Spain) Victor Ruiz	
16/4/2025	(Spain) Alex Arroyo (Spain) Eduardo Alonso	3–6 / 6–3 / 6–4	(Argentina) Alex Chozas (Spain) Alex Ruiz	
16/4/2025	(Spain) Alejandro Galán (Argentina) Federico Chingotto	7–5 / 6–3	(Brazil) Lucas Campagnolo (Argentina) Maxi Sánchez	

Women's

Date	Winners	Score	Opponent	Refs.
16/4/2025	(Spain) Ariana Sánchez (Spain) Paula Josemaría	6–0 / 6–0	(Russia) Ksenia Sharifova (Spain) Marta Talavan	
16/4/2025	(Argentina) Claudia Jensen (Spain) Tamara Icardo	6–2 / 6–4	(Spain) Agueda Perez (Spain) Melania Merino	
16/4/2025	(Spain) Lucia Sainz (Spain) Patricia Llaguno	6–2 / 1–6 / 5–0 / W.O.	(Spain) Marta Borrero (Spain) Martina Calvo Santamaria	
16/4/2025	(Spain) Bea González (Spain) Claudia Fernández	6–1 / 7–5	(Spain) Marta Barrera (Spain) Marta Caparrós	
16/4/2025	(Spain) Marta Ortega (Portugal) Sofia Araújo	6–2 / 5–2 / W.O.	(France) Alix Collombon (Spain) Araceli Martinez	
16/4/2025	(Spain) Alejandra Salazar (Spain) Verónica Virseda	1–6 / 6–3 / 7–5	(Italy) Carolina Orsi (Spain) Nuria Rodriguez	
16/4/2025	(Spain) Beatriz Caldera (Spain) Carmen Goenaga	6–2 / 6–2	(Spain) Alejandra Alonso (Spain) Andrea Ustero	
16/4/2025	(Argentina) Delfina Brea (Spain) Gemma Triay	2–6 / 6–4 / 6–1	(Spain) Marina Guinart (Spain) Victoria Iglesias	

=== Quarter-Finals ===
Men's

Date	Winners	Score	Opponent	Refs.
17/4/2025	(Argentina) Agustín Tapia (Spain) Arturo Coello	6–4 / 6–4	(Argentina) Leandro Augsburger (Spain) Pablo Cardona	
17/4/2025	(Spain) Coki Nieto (Spain) Mike Yanguas	7–6 / 4–6 / 7–5	(Spain) Jon Sanz (Spain) Momo Gonzalez	
17/4/2025	(Brazil) Lucas Bergamini (Spain) Paquito Navarro	6–4 / 4–6 / 6–3	(Spain) Javi Garrido (Argentina) Martin Di Nenno	
17/4/2025	(Spain) Alejandro Galán (Argentina) Federico Chingotto	6–1 / 6–4	(Spain) Alex Arroyo (Spain) Eduardo Alonso	

Women's

Date	Winners	Score	Opponent	Refs.
17/4/2025	(Spain) Ariana Sánchez (Spain) Paula Josemaría	7–5 / 6–1	(Argentina) Claudia Jensen (Spain) Tamara Icardo	
17/4/2025	(Spain) Bea González (Spain) Claudia Fernández	6–3 / 6–3	(Spain) Lucia Sainz (Spain) Patricia Llaguno	
17/4/2025	(Spain) Alejandra Salazar (Spain) Verónica Virseda	2–6 / 6–2 / 6–4	(Spain) Marta Ortega (Portugal) Sofia Araújo	
17/4/2025	(Argentina) Delfina Brea (Spain) Gemma Triay	6–2 / 7–5	(Spain) Beatriz Caldera (Spain) Carmen Goenaga	

=== Semi-Finals ===
Men's

Date	Winners	Score	Opponent	Refs.
18/4/2025	(Argentina) Agustín Tapia (Spain) Arturo Coello	6–2 / 7–5	(Spain) Coki Nieto (Spain) Mike Yanguas	
18/4/2025	(Spain) Alejandro Galán (Argentina) Federico Chingotto	6–3 / 7–5	(Brazil) Lucas Bergamini (Spain) Paquito Navarro	

Women's

Date	Winners	Score	Opponent	Refs.
18/4/2025	(Spain) Ariana Sánchez (Spain) Paula Josemaría	6–2 / 5–7 / 6–4	(Spain) Bea González (Spain) Claudia Fernández	
18/4/2025	(Argentina) Delfina Brea (Spain) Gemma Triay	6–0 / 6–7 / 6–1	(Spain) Alejandra Salazar (Spain) Verónica Virseda	

=== Finals ===
Men's

Date	Winners	Score	Opponent	Refs.
19/4/2025	(Argentina) Agustín Tapia (Spain) Arturo Coello	7–6 / 6–2	(Spain) Alejandro Galán (Argentina) Federico Chingotto	

Women's

Date	Winners	Score	Opponent	Refs.
19/4/2025	(Argentina) Delfina Brea (Spain) Gemma Triay	6–4 / 6–4	(Spain) Ariana Sánchez (Spain) Paula Josemaría	
