= 2025 Riyadh P1 =

Padel championships

- Date: 8 February – 17 February
- Edition: 2nd
- Category: P1
- Prize money: €470.000
- Location: Riyadh, Saudi Arabia
- Venue: Padel Rush Arena

Champions
- Men's doubles: (Argentina) Agustín Tapia (Spain) Arturo Coello
- Women's doubles: (Spain) Ariana Sánchez (Spain) Paula Josemaría

Chronology
Previous
Premier Padel Finals
(2024)
Next
Gijón P2

The 2025 Riyadh P1 (officially 2025 Riyadh Season Premier Padel P1) was the first tournament of the fourth season organized by Premier Padel, the premier padel circuit, promoted by the International Padel Federation, and with the financial backing of Nasser Al-Khelaïfi's Qatar Sports Investments.

In the women's category, the top-ranked and third-ranked pairs from the FIP rankings reached the final. Due to a physical issue affecting Bea González, she and Claudia Fernández were forced to withdraw from the match, handing Ariana Sánchez and Paula Josemaría their first title of 2025.

In the men's category, the world number ones Agustín Tapia and Arturo Coello continued the good run from 2024 form by reaching the finals to face the number 3 pair, Franco Stupaczuk and Juan Lebrón, who were competing in their first tournament as a team. After a hard-fought three-set match, the number ones managed to overcome Lebrón and Stupaczuk to claim their first title of the year.

== Relevant Data ==
=== New pairs ===
Several new pairs made their debut at the tournament. The world's second and third-ranked pairs parted ways, with Gemma Triay began playing with Delfina Brea, while their former partners, Bea González and Claudia Fernández joined forces. In the men's category, Juan Lebrón parted ways with Martín Di Nenno to play with Franco Stupaczuk, while Di Nenno teamed up with Javi Garrido. Rounding out the top four, Mike Yanguas partnered with Coki Nieto.

=== Old partners face each other ===
During the tournament, there were several reunions: Martin Di Nenno faced Lebrón and Stupaczuk, the two players he had partnered with in 2024, in the quarterfinals, while Bea and Claudia faced their former partners in the semifinals.

=== Postponed games ===
Due to heavy rain and weather conditions, six of the quarterfinal matches scheduled for February 13 were postponed to the following day.

=== Number 1s continue their good form from 2024 ===
With this tournament victory, Agustín Tapia and Arturo Coello secured their 30th title as a pair, having achieved a total of 198 wins in 216 matches over two years, with a 91.67% success rate. Having contested 39 finals, the world number ones recorded 30 wins and just 9 losses, a 76.9% success rate, making them the fifth most successful pair of all time, behind Galán-Lebrón by three titles.

== Seeds ==
Male

Rnk.	Team	FIP Ranking Points
1	(Argentina) Agustín Tapia (Spain) Arturo Coello	39160
2	(Spain) Alejandro Galán (Argentina) Federico Chingotto	25510
3	(Argentina) Franco Stupaczuk (Spain) Juan Lebrón	16595
4	(Spain) Coki Nieto (Spain) Mike Yanguas	13270
5	(Spain) Javi Garrido (Argentina) Martin Di Nenno	13085
6	(Spain) Jon Sanz (Spain) Momo Gonzalez	10465
7	(Brazil) Lucas Bergamini (Spain) Paquito Navarro	8565
8	(Spain) Alejandro Arroyo (Spain) Eduardo Alonso	7182
9	(Argentina) Leandro Augsburguer (Spain) Pablo Cardona	5022
10	(Argentina) Alex Chozas (Spain) Álex Ruiz	4747
11	(Spain) Javi Leal (Argentina) Sanyo Gutiérrez	4440
12	(Spain) Francisco Guerrero (Spain) Jairo Bautista	4247
13	(Argentina) Lucas Campagnolo (Argentina) Maxi Sanchéz	4025
14	(Spain) Juanlu Esbri (Argentina) Lucho Capra	3911
15	(Argentina) Juan Tello (Argentina) Valentino Libaak	3720
16	(Spain) Javier Barahona (Spain) Javier Garcia Mora	3329

Female

Rnk.	Team	FIP Ranking Points
1	(Spain) Ariana Sánchez (Spain) Paula Josemaria	32300
2	(Argentina) Delfina Brea (Spain) Gemma Triay	23300
3	(Spain) Bea González (Spain) Claudia Fernandéz	20870
4	(Spain) Marta Ortega (Portugal) Sofia Araújo	13730
5	(Spain) Lucia Sainz (Spain) Patricia Llaguno	10780
6	(Spain) Alejandra Salazar (Spain) Veronica Virseda	10530
7	(Argentina) Aranzazu Osoro (Spain) Jessica Castello	9815
8	(Argentina) Claudia Jensen (Spain) Tamara Icardo	9650
9	(Spain) Alejandra Alonso (Spain) Andrea Ustero	9410
10	(Spain) Marta Marrero (Argentina) Virginia Riera	4644
11	(Spain) Beatriz Caldera (Spain) Carmen Goenaga	4220
12	(Spain) Marina Guinart (Spain) Victoria Iglesias	3828
13	(Italy) Carolina Orsi (Spain) Nuria Rodriguez	3621
14	(France) Alix Collombon (Spain) Araceli Martinez	3486
15	(Russia) Ksenia Sharifova (Spain) Marta Talavan	3409
16	(Spain) Lara Arruabarrena (Spain) Lorena Rufo	3315

== Head-to-head record between teams ranked in the top 4 during the season ==
=== Man's ===
Record	Coello–Tapia	Galán–Chingotto	Lebrón–Stupaczuk	Coki–Yanguas
Coello–Tapia	—	—	1–0	1–0
Galán–Chingotto	—	—	—	—
Lebrón–Stupaczuk	0–1	—	—	—
Coki–Yanguas	0–1	—	—	—

=== Women's ===
Record	Ariana–Paula	D. Brea–Triay	Gonzalez–Fernandez	Araújo–Ortega
Ariana–Paula	—	—	1–0	1–0
D. Brea–Triay	—	—	0–1	—
Gonzalez–Fernandez	0–1	1–0	—	—
Araújo–Ortega	0–1	—	—	—

== Draws ==
=== Men's Bracket ===
Round of 32
1	(Spain) Coello / (Argentina) Tapia
Bye
28	(Italy) A. Patiniotis / (Spain) D. Sanchez	4	6	6
14	(Spain) J. Esbri / (Argentina) L. Capra	6	0	7
10	(Argentina) A. Chozas / (Spain) A. Ruiz	6	6	6
22	(United Arab Emirates) I. Jofre / (Spain) L.H. Quesada	3	7	4
Q	(Argentina) I. Piotto / (Spain) M. Del Castillo	2	5
8	(Spain) A. Arroyo / (Spain) E. Alonso	6	7
7	(Brazil) L. Bergamini / (Spain) Paquito	6	3	6
19	(Spain) G. Rubio / (Spain) P. Lijó	0	6	3
33	(Spain) P.H. Alvarez / (Argentina) R. Valenzuela	2	3
15	(Argentina) J. Tello / (Argentina) V. Libaak	6	6
12	(Spain) F. Guerrero / (Spain) J. Bautista	7	6
Q	(Spain) A. Sans / (Spain) M. Quilez	5	3
Bye
4	(Spain) Coki / (Spain) Yanguas
3	(Spain) Lebrón / (Argentina) Stupaczuk
Bye
30	(Spain) A. Cepero / (Argentina) E. Torre	4	7	1
13	(Brazil) L. Campagnolo / (Argentina) Maxi	6	6	6
11	(Spain) J. Leal / (Argentina) Sanyo	7	7
23	(Spain) J. Rico / (Spain) J. Moya	5	6
21	(Spain) I. Sager / (Argentina) J.C. Belluati	1	2
5	(Spain) J. Garrido / (Argentina) Di Nenno	6	6
6	(Spain) J. Sanz / (Spain) Momo	6	6
34	(Argentina) F. Mouriño / (Spain) M.H. Hernandez	2	2
18	(Spain) E. Goenaga / (Spain) T. Zapata	6	7	4
9	(Argentina) L. Augsburger / (Spain) P. Cardona	7	5	6
16	(Spain) J. Barahona / (Spain) J.G. Mora	3	4
Q	(Portugal) M. Deus / (Portugal) N. Deus	6	6
Bye
2	(Spain) Galán / (Argentina) Chingotto

Round of 16
1	(Spain) Coello / (Argentina) Tapia	6	6
14	(Spain) J. Esbri / (Argentina) L. Capra	2	3
10	(Argentina) A. Chozas / (Spain) A. Ruiz	6	3	6
8	(Spain) A. Arroyo / (Spain) E. Alonso	3	6	4
7	(Brazil) L. Bergamini / (Spain) Paquito	6	6	6
15	(Argentina) J. Tello / (Argentina) V. Libaak	2	7	7
12	(Spain) F. Guerrero / (Spain) J. Bautista	6	4
4	(Spain) Coki / (Spain) Yanguas	7	6
3	(Spain) Lebrón / (Argentina) Stupaczuk	6	6
13	(Brazil) L. Campagnolo / (Argentina) Maxi	4	3
11	(Spain) J. Leal / (Argentina) Sanyo	4	2
5	(Spain) J. Garrido / (Argentina) Di Nenno	6	6
6	(Spain) J. Sanz / (Spain) Momo	6	3
9	(Argentina) L. Augsburger / (Spain) P. Cardona	7	6
Q	(Portugal) M. Deus / (Portugal) N. Deus	4	2
2	(Spain) Galán / (Argentina) Chingotto	6	6

Quarter-Final
1	(Spain) Coello / (Argentina) Tapia	7	6
10	(Argentina) A. Chozas / (Spain) A. Ruiz	6	2
15	(Argentina) J. Tello / (Argentina) V. Libaak	3	6	3
4	(Spain) Coki / (Spain) Yanguas	6	4	6
3	(Spain) Lebrón / (Argentina) Stupaczuk	6	7
5	(Spain) J. Garrido / (Argentina) Di Nenno	2	5
9	(Argentina) L. Augsburger / (Spain) P. Cardona	6	4	6
2	(Spain) Galán / (Argentina) Chingotto	3	6	3

Semi-Finals
1	(Spain) Coello / (Argentina) Tapia	6	6
4	(Spain) Coki / (Spain) Yanguas	3	2
3	(Spain) Lebrón / (Argentina) Stupaczuk	4	6	7
9	(Argentina) L. Augsburger / (Spain) P. Cardona	6	3	5

Finals
1	(Spain) Coello / (Argentina) Tapia	6	5	6
3	(Spain) Lebrón / (Argentina) Stupaczuk	3	7	3

=== Women's Bracket ===
Round of 32
1	(Spain) A. Sánchez / (Spain) P. Josemaria
Bye
16	(Spain) L. Arruabarrena / (Spain) L. Rufo	5	5
14	(France) A. Collombon / (Spain) A. Martinez	7	7
21	(Spain) M. Barrera / (Spain) M. Caparrós	5	6	1
18	(Italy) G. Marchetti / (Spain) S. Ruiz	7	1	6
17	(Argentina) J. Bidahorria / (Spain) L. Martinez	2	4
8	(Argentina) C. Jensen / (Spain) T. Icardo	6	6
7	(Argentina) A. Osoro / (Spain) J. Castello	7	6	2
12	(Spain) M. Guinart / (Spain) V. Iglesias	6	7	6
23	(Spain) N. Aguilar / (Spain) T. Navarro	7	4	0
19	(Spain) J. Velasco / (Spain) N. Canovas	6	6	0
Q	(Spain) M. Lobo / (Spain) S. Saiz	6	6
WC	(Saudi Arabia) A. Yamani / (Saudi Arabia) A. Fareh	0	0
Bye
4	(Spain) M. Ortega / (Portugal) S. Araújo
3	(Spain) B. Gonzalez / (Spain) C. Fernandez
Bye
15	(Russia) K. Sharifova / (Spain) M. Talavan	7	3	7
13	(Italy) C. Orsi / (Spain) N. Rodriguez	6	6	6
10	(Spain) M. Marrero / (Argentina) V. Riera	6	7
Q	(Spain) M. Borrero / (Spain) M. Santamaria	0	5
11	(Spain) B. Caldera / (Spain) C. Goenaga	6	7
6	(Spain) A. Salazar / (Spain) V. Virseda	4	6
5	(Spain) L. Sainz / (Spain) P. Llaguno	6	6
Q	(Spain) J. Cabruja / (Spain) J. Bautista	3	4
20	(Spain) B. Las Heras / (Spain) E. Carnicero	6	4	4
Q	(Spain) M.R. Abajo / R. Barrera	3	6	6
9	(Spain) A. Alonso / (Spain) A. Ustero	6	6
22	(Portugal) A. Nogueira / (Argentina) M. Goyeneche	4	4
Bye
2	(Argentina) D. Brea / (Spain) G. Triay

Round of 16
1	(Spain) A. Sánchez / (Spain) P. Josemaria	6	6
14	(France) A. Collombon / (Spain) A. Martinez	1	0
18	(Italy) G. Marchetti / (Spain) S. Ruiz	4	2
8	(Argentina) C. Jensen / (Spain) T. Icardo	6	6
12	(Spain) M. Guinart / (Spain) V. Iglesias	4	5
19	(Spain) J. Velasco / (Spain) N. Canovas	6	7
Q	(Spain) M. Lobo / (Spain) S. Saiz	2	2
4	(Spain) M. Ortega / (Portugal) S. Araújo	6	6
3	(Spain) B. Gonzalez / (Spain) C. Fernandez	6	6
15	(Russia) K. Sharifova / (Spain) M. Talavan	1	2
10	(Spain) M. Marrero / (Argentina) V. Riera	3	4
11	(Spain) B. Caldera / (Spain) C. Goenaga	6	6
5	(Spain) L. Sainz / (Spain) P. Llaguno	6	6
Q	(Spain) M.R. Abajo / R. Barrera	1	4
9	(Spain) A. Alonso / (Spain) A. Ustero	4	7	4
2	(Argentina) D. Brea / (Spain) G. Triay	6	5	6

Quarter-Final
1	(Spain) A. Sánchez / (Spain) P. Josemaria	6	6
8	(Argentina) C. Jensen / (Spain) T. Icardo	3	1
19	(Spain) J. Velasco / (Spain) N. Canovas	1	5
4	(Spain) M. Ortega / (Portugal) S. Araújo	6	7
3	(Spain) B. Gonzalez / (Spain) C. Fernandez	6	6
11	(Spain) B. Caldera / (Spain) C. Goenaga	2	0
5	(Spain) L. Sainz / (Spain) P. Llaguno	4	3
2	(Argentina) D. Brea / (Spain) G. Triay	6	6

Semi-Finals
1	(Spain) A. Sánchez / (Spain) P. Josemaria	6	6
4	(Spain) M. Ortega / (Portugal) S. Araújo	0	5
3	(Spain) B. Gonzalez / (Spain) C. Fernandez	4	6	6
2	(Argentina) D. Brea / (Spain) G. Triay	6	3	4

Finals
1	(Spain) A. Sánchez / (Spain) P. Josemaria	*
3	(Spain) B. Gonzalez / (Spain) C. Fernandez

== Results ==
=== First Round ===
Men's

Date	Winners	Score	Opponent	Refs.
10/2/2025	(Italy) Aris Patiniotis (Spain) David Gala Sanchez	6–2 / 6–7 / 6–2	(Spain) Francisco Gil Morales (Spain) Victor Ruiz	
10/2/2025	(United Arab Emirates) Iñigo Jofre (Spain) Luis Hernandez Quesada	6–2 / 4–6 / 6–2	(Spain) Rafael Mendez (Spain) Toni Bueno	
10/2/2025	(Argentina) Ignacio Piotto (Spain) Mario Del Castillo	6–2 / 6–3	(Spain) Emilio Sanchez Chamero (Chile) Javier Valdes	
10/2/2025	(Spain) Gonzalo Rubio (Spain) Pablo Lijó	6–4 / 6–0	(Spain) José Jimenez Casas (Spain) Miguel Benitez	
10/2/2025	(Spain) Pol Hernandez (Argentina) Ramiro Valenzuela	7–6 / 3–6 / 6–3	(Spain) Daniel Santigosa (Argentina) Miguel Lamperti	
10/2/2025	(Spain) Anton Sans Riola (Spain) Marc Quilez	6–0 / 6–0	(Saudi Arabia) Abudlrahman Alazzan (Saudi Arabia) Qassem Alobidan	
10/2/2025	(Spain) Alvero Cepero (Argentina) Eduardo Agustin Torre	6–3 / 5–7 / 6–4	(Spain) Javi Ruiz (Spain) Jose García Diestro	
10/2/2025	(Spain) Javier Rico (Spain) Jesus Moya	1–6 / 6–2 / 6–3	(Spain) Ignacio Vilariño (Spain) Salvador Oria	
10/2/2025	(Spain) Ignacio Sager (Argentina) Juan Cruz Belluati	6–3 / 4–6 / 6–3	(Argentina) Agustin Gutiérrez (Spain) José Rico	
10/2/2025	(Argentina) Federico Mouriño (Spain) Mario Huete Hernandez	6–4 / 3–6 / 6–3	(Spain) Jaime Muñoz (Spain) Pincho Fernandez	
10/2/2025	(Spain) Enrique Goenaga (Spain) Teodoro Zapata	6–0 / 6–1	(Saudi Arabia) Abdullah Alabdullah (Saudi Arabia) Faisal Alrebdi	
10/2/2025	(Portugal) Miguel Deus (Portugal) Nuno Deus	7–5 / 6–3	(Spain) Arnau Ayats (Spain) Pablo García Rodrigo	

=== Round of 32 ===
Men's

Date	Winners	Score	Opponent	Refs.
11/2/2025	(Spain) Juanlu Esbri (Argentina) Lucho Capra	6–4 / 0–6 / 7–6	(Italy) Aris Patiniotis (Spain) David Gala Sanchez	
11/2/2025	(Argentina) Alex Chozas (Spain) Alex Ruiz	6–3 / 6–7 / 6–4	(United Arab Emirates) Iñigo Jofre (Spain) Luis Hernandez Quesada	
11/2/2025	(Spain) Alex Arroyo (Spain) Eduardo Alonso	6–2 / 7–5	(Argentina) Ignacio Piotto (Spain) Mario Del Castillo	
11/2/2025	(Brazil) Lucas Bergamini (Spain) Paquito Navarro	6–0 / 3–6 / 6–3	(Spain) Gonzalo Rubio (Spain) Pablo Lijó	
11/2/2025	(Argentina) Juan Tello (Argentina) Valentino Libaak	6–2 / 6–3	(Spain) Pol Hernandez (Argentina) Ramiro Valenzuela	
11/2/2025	(Spain) Francisco Guerrero (Spain) Jairo Bautista	7–5 / 6–3	(Spain) Anton Sans Riola (Spain) Marc Quilez	
11/2/2025	(Brazil) Lucas Campagnolo (Argentina) Maxi Sánchez	6–4 / 6–7 / 6–1	(Spain) Alvero Cepero (Argentina) Eduardo Agustin Torre	
11/2/2025	(Spain) Javier Leal (Argentina) Sanyo Gutiérrez	7–5 / 7–6	(Spain) Javier Rico (Spain) Jesus Moya	
11/2/2025	(Spain) Javi Garrido (Argentina) Martin Di Nenno	6–1 / 6–2	(Spain) Ignacio Sager (Argentina) Juan Cruz Belluati	
11/2/2025	(Spain) Jon Sanz (Spain) Momo Gonzalez	6–2 / 6–2	(Argentina) Federico Mouriño (Spain) Mario Huete Hernandez	
11/2/2025	(Argentina) Leandro Augsburger (Spain) Pablo Cardona	7–6 / 5–7 / 6–4	(Spain) Enrique Goenaga (Spain) Teodoro Zapata	
11/2/2025	(Portugal) Miguel Deus (Portugal) Nuno Deus	6–3 / 6–4	(Spain) Javier García Mora (Spain) Javier Gonzalez Barahona	

Women's

Date	Winners	Score	Opponent	Refs.
10/2/2025	(France) Alix Collombon (Spain) Araceli Martinez	7–5 / 7–5	(Spain) Lara Arruabarrena (Spain) Lorena Rufo	
10/2/2025	(Italy) Giorgia Marchetti (Spain) Sara Ruiz	7–5 / 1–6 / 6–1	(Spain) Marta Barrera (Spain) Marta Caparrós	
11/2/2025	(Argentina) Claudia Jensen (Spain) Tamara Icardo	6–2 / 6–4	(Argentina) Julieta Bidahorria (Spain) Lucia Martinez Gomez	
11/2/2025	(Spain) Marina Guinart (Spain) Victoria Iglesias	6–7 / 7–6 / 6–2	(Argentina) Aranzazu Osoro (Spain) Jessica Castelló	
11/2/2025	(Spain) Jimena Velasco (Spain) Noa Canovas	6–7 / 6–4 / W.O.	(Spain) Noemi Aguilar (Spain) Teresa Navarro	
10/2/2025	(Spain) Marina Martinez Lobo (Spain) Sofía Saiz Vallejo	6–0 / 6–0	(Saudi Arabia) Areej Khalil Fareh (Saudi Arabia) Alanoud Yamani	
11/2/2025	(Russia) Ksenia Sharifova (Spain) Marta Talavan	7–6 / 3–6 / 7–6	(Italy) Carolina Orsi (Spain) Nuria Rodriguez	
11/2/2025	(Spain) Marta Marrero (Argentina) Virginia Riera	6–0 / 7–5	(Spain) Marta Borrero (Spain) Martina Calvo Santamaria	
10/2/2025	(Spain) Beatriz Caldera (Spain) Carmen Goenaga	6–4 / 7–6	(Spain) Alejandra Salazar (Spain) Verónica Virseda	
10/2/2025	(Spain) Lucia Sainz (Spain) Patricia Llaguno	6–3 / 6–4	(Spain) Jana Montes Cabruja (Spain) Julia Polo Bautista	
10/2/2025	(Spain) Laia Rodriguez Abajo (Spain) Raquel Eugenio Barrera	3–6 / 6–4 / 6–4	(Spain) Barbara Las Heras (Spain) Esther Carnicero	
11/2/2025	(Spain) Alejandra Alonso (Spain) Andrea Ustero	6–4 / 6–4	(Portugal) Ana Catarina Nogueira (Argentina) Martina Fassio Goyeneche	

=== Round of 16 ===
Men's

Date	Winners	Score	Opponent	Refs.
12/2/2025	(Argentina) Agustín Tapia (Spain) Arturo Coello	6–2 / 6–3	(Spain) Juanlu Esbri (Argentina) Lucho Capra	
12/2/2025	(Argentina) Alex Chozas (Spain) Alex Ruiz	6–3 / 3–6 / 6–4	(Spain) Alex Arroyo (Spain) Eduardo Alonso	
12/2/2025	(Argentina) Juan Tello (Argentina) Valentino Libaak	2–6 / 7–6 / 7–6	(Brazil) Lucas Bergamini (Spain) Paquito Navarro	
12/2/2025	(Spain) Coki Nieto (Spain) Mike Yanguas	7–6 / 6–4	(Spain) Francisco Guerrero (Spain) Jairo Bautista	
12/2/2025	(Argentina) Franco Stupaczuk (Spain) Juan Lebrón	6–4 / 6–3	(Brazil) Lucas Campagnolo (Argentina) Maxi Sánchez	
12/2/2025	(Spain) Javi Garrido (Argentina) Martin Di Nenno	6–4 / 6–2	(Spain) Javier Leal (Argentina) Sanyo Gutiérrez	
12/2/2025	(Argentina) Leandro Augsburger (Spain) Pablo Cardona	7–6 / 6–3	(Spain) Jon Sanz (Spain) Momo Gonzalez	
12/2/2025	(Spain) Alejandro Galán (Argentina) Federico Chingotto	6–4 / 6–2	(Portugal) Miguel Deus (Portugal) Nuno Deus	

Women's

Date	Winners	Score	Opponent	Refs.
12/2/2025	(Spain) Ariana Sánchez (Spain) Paula Josemaría	6–1 / 6–0	(France) Alix Collombon (Spain) Araceli Martinez	
12/2/2025	(Argentina) Claudia Jensen (Spain) Tamara Icardo	6–4 / 6–2	(Italy) Giorgia Marchetti (Spain) Sara Ruiz	
12/2/2025	(Spain) Jimena Velasco (Spain) Noa Canovas	6–4 / 7–5	(Spain) Marina Guinart (Spain) Victoria Iglesias	
12/2/2025	(Spain) Marta Ortega (Portugal) Sofia Araújo	6–2 / 6–2	(Spain) Marina Martinez Lobo (Spain) Sofía Saiz Vallejo	
12/2/2025	(Spain) Bea González (Spain) Claudia Fernández	6–1 / 6–2	(Russia) Ksenia Sharifova (Spain) Marta Talavan	
12/2/2025	(Spain) Beatriz Caldera (Spain) Carmen Goenaga	6–3 / 6–4	(Spain) Marta Marrero (Argentina) Virginia Riera	
12/2/2025	(Spain) Lucia Sainz (Spain) Patricia Llaguno	6–1 / 6–4	(Spain) Laia Rodriguez Abajo (Spain) Raquel Eugenio Barrera	
12/2/2025	(Argentina) Delfina Brea (Spain) Gemma Triay	6–4 / 5–7 / 6–4	(Spain) Alejandra Alonso (Spain) Andrea Ustero	

=== Quarter-Finals ===
Men's

Date	Winners	Score	Opponent	Refs.
14/2/2025	(Argentina) Agustín Tapia (Spain) Arturo Coello	7–6 / 6–2	(Argentina) Alex Chozas (Spain) Alex Ruiz	
14/2/2025	(Spain) Coki Nieto (Spain) Mike Yanguas	6–3 / 4–6 / 6–3	(Argentina) Juan Tello (Argentina) Valentino Libaak	
14/2/2025	(Argentina) Franco Stupaczuk (Spain) Juan Lebrón	6–2 / 7–5	(Spain) Javi Garrido (Argentina) Martin Di Nenno	
14/2/2025	(Argentina) Leandro Augsburger (Spain) Pablo Cardona	6–3 / 4–6 / 6–3	(Spain) Alejandro Galán (Argentina) Federico Chingotto	

Women's

Date	Winners	Score	Opponent	Refs.
13/2/2025	(Spain) Ariana Sánchez (Spain) Paula Josemaría	6–3 / 6–1	(Argentina) Claudia Jensen (Spain) Tamara Icardo	
13/2/2025	(Spain) Marta Ortega (Portugal) Sofia Araújo	6–1 / 7–5	(Spain) Jimena Velasco (Spain) Noa Canovas	
14/2/2025	(Spain) Bea González (Spain) Claudia Fernández	6–2 / 6–0	(Spain) Beatriz Caldera (Spain) Carmen Goenaga	
14/2/2025	(Argentina) Delfina Brea (Spain) Gemma Triay	6–4 / 6–3	(Spain) Lucia Sainz (Spain) Patricia Llaguno	

=== Semi-Finals ===
Men's

Date	Winners	Score	Opponent	Refs.
16/5/2025	(Argentina) Agustín Tapia (Spain) Arturo Coello	6–3 / 6–2	(Spain) Coki Nieto (Spain) Mike Yanguas	
16/5/2025	(Argentina) Franco Stupaczuk (Spain) Juan Lebrón	4–6 / 6–3 / 7–5	(Argentina) Leandro Augsburger (Spain) Pablo Cardona	

Women's

Date	Winners	Score	Opponent	Refs.
16/5/2025	(Spain) Ariana Sánchez (Spain) Paula Josemaría	6–0 / 7–5	(Spain) Marta Ortega (Portugal) Sofia Araújo	
16/5/2025	(Spain) Bea González (Spain) Claudia Fernández	4–6 / 6–3 / 6–4	(Argentina) Delfina Brea (Spain) Gemma Triay	

=== Finals ===
Men's

Date	Winners	Score	Opponent	Refs.
17/2/2025	(Argentina) Agustín Tapia (Spain) Arturo Coello	6–3 / 5–7 / 6–3	(Argentina) Franco Stupaczuk (Spain) Juan Lebrón	

Women's

Date	Winners	Score	Opponent	Refs.
17/2/2025	(Spain) Ariana Sánchez (Spain) Paula Josemaría	W.O.	(Spain) Bea González (Spain) Claudia Fernández	
