= 2025 Rotterdam P1 =

Padel championships

- Date: 28 September – 5 October
- Edition: 2nd
- Category: P1
- Prize money: €474.500
- Location: Rotterdam, Netherlands
- Venue: Rotterdam Ahoy

Champions
- Men's doubles: (Argentina) Agustín Tapia (Spain) Arturo Coello
- Women's doubles: (Argentina) Delfina Brea (Spain) Gemma Triay

Chronology

The 2025 Rotterdam P1 (officially 2025 Premier Padel Decathlon Rotterdam P1) was the eighteenth tournament of the fourth season organized by Premier Padel, the premier padel circuit, promoted by the International Padel Federation, and with the financial backing of Nasser Al-Khelaïfi's Qatar Sports Investments.

In the women's category, the top two pairs in the FIP rankings both reached the final for the ninth time in 2025. In the title match, Delfina Brea & Gemma Triay defeated Ariana Sánchez & Paula Josemaría in three sets, claiming their ninth title of the season and extending their head-to-head over their rivals to 7–1 (with one draw).

In the men's category, the top two pairs in the FIP rankings faced each other in a final for the ninth time in 2025. In the title match, Agustín Tapia and Arturo Coello avenged their loss from the previous tournament by defeating Alejandro Galán and Federico Chingotto for the seventh time in 2025, securing their tenth title of the season.

== Relevant Data ==
=== Bea and Claudia out ===
Bea González and Claudia Fernández were forced to withdraw from the Rotterdam P1 following a medical recommendation given to Bea as a preventive measure to avoid a potential injury. Their spot would be taken by a "lucky loser" pair, who would face Lara Arruabarrena and Julieta Bidahorria in the Round of 16.

=== Coello and Tapia 40th ===
With the tournament victory, Arturo Coello and Agustín Tapia secured their 40th title as a team.

== Seeds ==
Male

Rnk.	Team	FIP Ranking Points
1	(Argentina) Agustín Tapia (Spain) Arturo Coello	36080
2	(Spain) Alejandro Galán (Argentina) Federico Chingotto	24740
3	(Argentina) Franco Stupaczuk (Spain) Juan Lebrón	15890
4	(Spain) Coki Nieto (Spain) Mike Yanguas	14381
5	(Spain) Jon Sanz (Spain) Paquito Navarro	9195
6	(Argentina) Leandro Augsburguer (Argentina) Martin Di Nenno	8897
7	(Spain) Francisco Guerrero (Spain) Momo Gonzalez	7735
8	(Brazil) Lucas Bergamini (Spain) Javi Leal	7582
9	(Spain) Eduardo Alonso (Argentina) Juan Tello	6069
10	(Spain) Javier Garrido (Spain) Pablo Cardona	5885
11	(Spain) Javier Barahona (Spain) Javier Garcia Mora	4830
12	(Spain) Alejandro Arroyo (United Arab Emirates) Inigo Jofre	4385
13	(Spain) Jairo Bautista (Argentina) Valentino Libaak	4335
14	(Spain) Alejandro Ruiz (Spain) Victor Ruiz	4176
15	(Argentina) Gonzalo Alfonso (Argentina) Sanyo Gutiérrez	3780
16	(Argentina) Alex Chozas (Argentina) Leonel Aguirre	3710

Female

Rnk.	Team	FIP Ranking Points
1	(Argentina) Delfina Brea (Spain) Gemma Triay	32810
2	(Spain) Ariana Sánchez (Spain) Paula Josemaria	25740
3	(Spain) Bea González (Spain) Claudia Fernandéz	22700
4	(Spain) Andrea Ustero (Portugal) Sofia Araújo	13085
5	(Spain) Marta Ortega (Spain) Tamara Icardo	12815
6	(Spain) Alejandra Alonso (Argentina) Claudia Jensen	9910
7	(Spain) Alejandra Salazar (Spain) Martina Calvo	7373
8	(Spain) Marina Guinart (Spain) Veronica Virseda	7070
9	(Argentina) Aranzazu Osoro (Spain) Victoria Iglesias	6320
10	(Spain) Beatriz Caldera (Spain) Carmen Goenaga	6169
11	(Spain) Lucia Sainz (Spain) Patricia Llaguno	6025
12	(Spain) Jessica Castelló (Spain) Lorena Rufo	5345
13	(France) Alix Collombon (Spain) Araceli Martinez	4154
14	(Spain) Marta Barrera (Spain) Marta Caparrós	4122
15	(Russia) Ksenia Sharifova (Argentina) Virginia Riera	3713
16	(Italy) Carolina Orsi (Argentina) Martina Fassio Goyeneche	3548

== Head-to-head record between teams ranked in the top 4 during the season ==
=== Man's ===
Record	Coello–Tapia	Galán–Chingotto	Lebrón–Stupaczuk	Coki–Yanguas
Coello–Tapia	—	7–2	3–1	5–0
Galán–Chingotto	2–7	—	5–1	5–0
Lebrón–Stupaczuk	1–3	1–5	—	—
Coki–Yanguas	0–5	0–5	—	—

=== Women's ===
Record	D. Brea–Triay	Ariana–Paula	Gonzalez–Fernandez	Araújo–Ustero	Former Pairs	Araújo–Ortega
D. Brea–Triay	—	7–1	2–5	3–0		3–0
Ariana–Paula	1–7	—	7–1	3–0		1–1
Gonzalez–Fernandez	5–2	1–7	—	—		—
Araújo–Ustero	0–3	0–3	—	—		—
Former Pairs						
Araújo–Ortega	0–3	1–1	—	—		—

Because the Santiago final ended in a draw, it is not counted.

== Draws ==
=== Men's Bracket ===
Round of 32
1	(Spain) Coello / (Argentina) Tapia	6	6
30	(Spain) E. Goenaga / (Spain) L.H. Quesada	3	3
Q	(Spain) E. Chamero / (Spain) J. Rico	0	1
16	(Argentina) A. Chozas / (Argentina) L. Aguirre	6	6
11	(Spain) J. Barahona / (Spain) J.G. Mora	5	4
36	(Argentina) F. Mouriño / (Argentina) R. Valenzuela	7	6
27	(Spain) A. Cepero / (Spain) A.F. Lancha	6	4
7	(Spain) F. Guerrero / (Spain) Momo	7	6
5	(Spain) J. Sanz / (Spain) Paquito	7	6
Q	(Argentina) A. Gutierrez / (Chile) J. Valdes	5	2
21	(Spain) F. Gil / (Argentina) Maxi	6	3	4
13	(Spain) J. Bautista / (Argentina) V. Libaak	1	6	6
14	(Spain) A. Ruiz / (Spain) V. Ruiz	4	4
17	(Spain) J.G. Diestro / (Spain) J. Esbri	6	6
18	(Spain) D. Sánchez / (Brazil) L. Campagnolo	2	7	5
4	(Spain) Coki / (Spain) Yanguas	6	6	7
3	(Spain) Lebrón / (Argentina) Stupaczuk	6	6
29	(Italy) A. Patiniotis / (Spain) J. Moya	4	2
Q	(Argentina) C.G. Gutiérrez / (Argentina) R. Nuñez	1	3
9	(Spain) E. Alonso / (Argentina) J. Tello	6	6
15	(Argentina) G. Alfonso / (Argentina) Sanyo	7	6
Q	(Spain) A.R. Martinez / (Argentina) J. Rubini	6	3
37	(Spain) I. Sager / (Spain) J. Rico	4	6
6	(Argentina) Di Nenno / (Argentina) L. Augsburger	6	7
8	(Spain) J. Leal / (Brazil) L. Bergamini	4	6	6
19	(Spain) G. Rubio / (Spain) J. Ruiz	6	2	1
Q	(Spain) A. Marques / (Spain) M. Sintes	6	3	6
10	(Spain) J. Garrido / (Spain) P. Cardona	2	6	4
12	(Spain) A. Arroyo / (United Arab Emirates) I. Jofre	6	7
Q	(Spain) A. Sans / (Spain) M. Quilez	1	6
34	(Italy) F. Dominguez / (Spain) J. Martinez	1	3
2	(Argentina) Chingotto / (Spain) Galán	6	6

Round of 16
1	(Spain) Coello / (Argentina) Tapia	6	6
16	(Argentina) A. Chozas / (Argentina) L. Aguirre	3	0
36	(Argentina) F. Mouriño / (Argentina) R. Valenzuela	3	4
7	(Spain) F. Guerrero / (Spain) Momo	6	6
5	(Spain) J. Sanz / (Spain) Paquito
13	(Spain) J. Bautista / (Argentina) V. Libaak	2	6
17	(Spain) J.G. Diestro / (Spain) J. Esbri	6	1
4	(Spain) Coki / (Spain) Yanguas	7	6
3	(Spain) Lebrón / (Argentina) Stupaczuk	6	7
9	(Spain) E. Alonso / (Argentina) J. Tello	3	6
15	(Argentina) G. Alfonso / (Argentina) Sanyo	3	6	7
6	(Argentina) Di Nenno / (Argentina) L. Augsburger	6	3	5
8	(Spain) J. Leal / (Brazil) L. Bergamini	6	6
Q	(Spain) A. Marques / (Spain) M. Sintes	3	4
12	(Spain) A. Arroyo / (United Arab Emirates) I. Jofre	5	4
2	(Argentina) Chingotto / (Spain) Galán	7	6

Quarter-Final
1	(Spain) Coello / (Argentina) Tapia	6	6
7	(Spain) F. Guerrero / (Spain) Momo	2	3
5	(Spain) J. Sanz / (Spain) Paquito	3	6	3
4	(Spain) Coki / (Spain) Yanguas	6	1	6
3	(Spain) Lebrón / (Argentina) Stupaczuk	6	7
15	(Argentina) G. Alfonso / (Argentina) Sanyo	1	6
8	(Spain) J. Leal / (Brazil) L. Bergamini	6	2
2	(Argentina) Chingotto / (Spain) Galán	7	6

Semi-Finals
1	(Spain) Coello / (Argentina) Tapia	4	6	6
4	(Spain) Coki / (Spain) Yanguas	6	1	0
3	(Spain) Lebrón / (Argentina) Stupaczuk	3	5
2	(Argentina) Chingotto / (Spain) Galán	6	7

Finals
1	(Spain) Coello / (Argentina) Tapia	6	7
2	(Argentina) Chingotto / (Spain) Galán	3	6

=== Women's Bracket ===
Round of 32
1	(Argentina) D. Brea / (Spain) Triay
Bye
18	(Spain) L. Martinez / (Spain) N. Rodriguez	6	6
Q	(Spain) B. Las Heras / (Spain) M. Arellano	1	2
WC	(Netherlands) M. Koek / (Netherlands) S. Weterings	2	2
Q	(Spain) J. Cabruja / (Spain) P. Martinez	6	6
19	(Spain) M.R. Abajo / (Spain) N. Canovas	2	6	2
8	(Spain) M. Guinart / (Spain) V. Virseda	6	4	6
6	(Spain) A. Alonso / (Argentina) C. Jensen	6	6
23	(Spain) M. Talavan / (Spain) S. Saiz	2	4
17	(Spain) J. Velasco / (Spain) R. Barrera	4	6	6
14	(Spain) M. Barrera / (Spain) M. Caparrós	6	0	2
Q	(Spain) J. Bautista / (Spain) N. Aguilar	4	6
20	(Argentina) J. Bidahorria / (Spain) L. Arruabarrena	6	7
Bye
LL	(Netherlands) Bo Luttikhuis / (Netherlands) J. Hemmes
4	(Spain) A. Ustero / (Portugal) S. Araújo
Bye
12	(Spain) J. Castelló / (Spain) L. Rufo	6	6
21	(Portugal) A. Nogueira / (Spain) M. Merino	1	1
16	(Italy) C. Orsi / (Argentina) M. Goyeneche	6	6
15	(Russia) K. Sharifova / (Argentina) V. Riera	4	3
Q	(Spain) C. Mesa / (Spain) S. Ruiz	1	2
7	(Spain) A. Salazar / (Spain) M. Calvo	6	6
5	(Spain) M. Ortega / (Spain) T. Icardo	7	6
10	(Spain) B. Caldera / (Spain) C. Goenaga	6	3
22	(Spain) A. Perez / (Spain) M. Borrero	2	3
9	(Argentina) A. Osoro / (Spain) V. Iglesias	6	6
11	(Spain) L. Sainz / (Spain) P. Llaguno	6	6
13	(France) A. Collombon / (Spain) A. Martinez	2	3
Bye
2	(Spain) A. Sánchez / (Spain) P. Josemaria

Round of 16
1	(Argentina) D. Brea / (Spain) Triay	*
18	(Spain) L. Martinez / (Spain) N. Rodriguez
Q	(Spain) J. Cabruja / (Spain) P. Martinez	2	3
8	(Spain) M. Guinart / (Spain) V. Virseda	6	6
6	(Spain) A. Alonso / (Argentina) C. Jensen	6	6
17	(Spain) J. Velasco / (Spain) R. Barrera	4	2
20	(Argentina) J. Bidahorria / (Spain) L. Arruabarrena	6	6
LL	(Netherlands) Bo Luttikhuis / (Netherlands) J. Hemmes	1	0
4	(Spain) A. Ustero / (Portugal) S. Araújo	6	6
12	(Spain) J. Castelló / (Spain) L. Rufo	3	4
16	(Italy) C. Orsi / (Argentina) M. Goyeneche	3	4
7	(Spain) A. Salazar / (Spain) M. Calvo	6	6
5	(Spain) M. Ortega / (Spain) T. Icardo	6	6
9	(Argentina) A. Osoro / (Spain) V. Iglesias	4	4
11	(Spain) L. Sainz / (Spain) P. Llaguno	4	1
2	(Spain) A. Sánchez / (Spain) P. Josemaria	6	6

Quarter-Final
1	(Argentina) D. Brea / (Spain) Triay	6	6
8	(Spain) M. Guinart / (Spain) V. Virseda	3	1
6	(Spain) A. Alonso / (Argentina) C. Jensen	6	6
20	(Argentina) J. Bidahorria / (Spain) L. Arruabarrena	3	1
4	(Spain) A. Ustero / (Portugal) S. Araújo	3	4
7	(Spain) A. Salazar / (Spain) M. Calvo	6	6
5	(Spain) M. Ortega / (Spain) T. Icardo	2	3
2	(Spain) A. Sánchez / (Spain) P. Josemaria	6	6

Semi-Finals
1	(Argentina) D. Brea / (Spain) Triay	6	6	6
6	(Spain) A. Alonso / (Argentina) C. Jensen	7	2	4
7	(Spain) A. Salazar / (Spain) M. Calvo	3	2
2	(Spain) A. Sánchez / (Spain) P. Josemaria	6	6

Finals
1	(Argentina) D. Brea / (Spain) Triay	6	3	6
2	(Spain) A. Sánchez / (Spain) P. Josemaria	2	6	4

== Results ==
=== First Round ===
Men's

Date	Winners	Score	Opponent	Refs.
30/9/2025	(Spain) Enrique Goenaga (Spain) Luis Hernandez Quesada	6–2 / 6–2	(Spain) Pablo García Rodrigo (Spain) Pincho Fernandez	
30/9/2025	(Spain) Emilio Sánchez Chamero (Spain) Jose Rico	6–4 / 7–5	(Spain) Mario Del Castillo (Spain) Teodoro Zapata	
30/9/2025	(Argentina) Federico Mouriño (Argentina) Ramiro Jesus Valenzuela	6–1 / 7–5	(Netherlands) Bart Van Opstal (Netherlands) Menno Nolten	
30/9/2025	(Spain) Alvaro Cepero (Spain) Andres Fernandez Lancha	6–1 / 2–6 / 6–4	(Spain) Alvaro Montiel (Argentina) Juan Cruz Belluati	
30/9/2025	(Argentina) Agustín Gutiérez (Chile) Javier Valdes	6–3 / 6–4	(Spain) Diego García (Spain) Jose Luis Gonzalez	
30/9/2025	(Spain) Francisco Gil Morales (Argentina) Maxi Sánchez	6–1 / 1–6 / 6–3	(Spain) Guillermo Collado (Spain) Pol Hernandez	
30/9/2025	(Spain) Jose García Diestro (Spain) Juanlu Esbri	4–6 / 7–5 / W.O.	(Spain) Aimar Goñi (Argentina) Lucho Capra	
30/9/2025	(Spain) David Gala Sanchez (Brazil) Lucas Campagnolo	7–5 / 6–4	(Spain) Jose Jimenez Casas (Argentina) Maxi Sanchez Blasco	
30/9/2025	(Italy) Aris Patiniotis (Spain) Jesus Moya	7–5 / 7–6	(Argentina) Maximiliano Arce (Spain) Pablo Lijó	
30/9/2025	(Argentina) Cristian German Gutiérrez (Argentina) Renzo Nuñez	3–6 / 6–4 / 7–5	(Netherlands) Julian Prins (Netherlands) Youp De Kroon	
30/9/2025	(Spain) Alonso Rodriguez (Argentina) Juan Ignacio Rubini	6–7 / 7–5 / 6–2	(Portugal) Miguel Deus (Portugal) Nuno Deus	
30/9/2025	(Spain) Ignacio Sager (Spain) Javi Rico	6–4 / 6–3	(Italy) Flavio Abbate (Italy) Marco Cassetta	
30/9/2025	(Spain) Gonzalo Rubio (Spain) Javi Ruiz	6–3 / 7–5	(Italy) Denis Perino (Argentina) Ignacio Piotto	
30/9/2025	(Spain) Adrian Marques (Spain) Marc Sintes	7–5 / 6–4	(Argentina) Eduardo Agustin Torre (Spain) Nacho Moragues	
30/9/2025	(Spain) Anton Sans Riola (Spain) Marc Quilez	6–4 / 6–4	(Sweden) Adam Axelsson (Spain) Daniel Santigosa	
30/9/2025	(Italy) Facundo Dominguez (Spain) Javier Martinez Vazquez	6–0 / 6–2	(Netherlands) Sten Richters (Netherlands) Thijs Roper	

=== Round of 32 ===
Men's

Date	Winners	Score	Opponent	Refs.
1/10/2025	(Argentina) Agustín Tapia (Spain) Arturo Coello	6–3 / 6–3	(Spain) Enrique Goenaga (Spain) Luis Hernandez Quesada	
1/10/2025	(Argentina) Alex Chozas (Argentina) Leonel Aguirre	6–0 / 6–1	(Spain) Emilio Sánchez Chamero (Spain) Jose Rico	
1/10/2025	(Argentina) Federico Mouriño (Argentina) Ramiro Jesus Valenzuela	7–5 / 6–4	(Spain) Javier Barahona (Spain) Javier García Mora	
1/10/2025	(Spain) Francisco Guerrero (Spain) Momo Gonzalez	7–6 / 6–4	(Spain) Alvaro Cepero (Spain) Andres Fernandez Lancha	
1/10/2025	(Spain) Jon Sanz (Spain) Paquito Navarro	7–5 / 6–2	(Argentina) Agustín Gutiérez (Chile) Javier Valdes	
1/10/2025	(Spain) Jairo Bautista (Argentina) Valentino Libaak	1–6 / 6–3 / 6–4	(Spain) Francisco Gil Morales (Argentina) Maxi Sánchez	
1/10/2025	(Spain) Jose García Diestro (Spain) Juanlu Esbri	6–4 / 6–4	(Spain) Aléx Ruiz (Spain) Victor Ruiz	
1/10/2025	(Spain) Coki Nieto (Spain) Mike Yanguas	6–2 / 6–7 / 7–5	(Spain) David Gala Sanchez (Brazil) Lucas Campagnolo	
1/10/2025	(Argentina) Franco Stupaczuk (Spain) Juan Lebrón	6–4 / 6–2	(Italy) Aris Patiniotis (Spain) Jesus Moya	
1/10/2025	(Spain) Eduardo Alonso (Argentina) Juan Tello	6–1 / 6–3	(Argentina) Cristian German Gutiérrez (Argentina) Renzo Nuñez	
1/10/2025	(Argentina) Gonzalo Alfonso (Argentina) Sanyo Gutiérrez	7–6 / 6–3	(Spain) Alonso Rodriguez (Argentina) Juan Ignacio Rubini	
1/10/2025	(Argentina) Leandro Augsburger (Argentina) Martin Di Nenno	6–4 / 7–6	(Spain) Ignacio Sager (Spain) Javi Rico	
1/10/2025	(Spain) Javi Leal (Brazil) Lucas Bergamini	4–6 / 6–2 / 6–1	(Spain) Gonzalo Rubio (Spain) Javi Ruiz	
1/10/2025	(Spain) Adrian Marques (Spain) Marc Sintes	6–2 / 3–6 / 6–4	(Spain) Javi Garrido (Spain) Pablo Cardona	
1/10/2025	(Spain) Alex Arroyo (United Arab Emirates) Iñigo Jofre	6–1 / 7–6	(Spain) Anton Sans Riola (Spain) Marc Quilez	
1/10/2025	(Spain) Alejandro Galán (Argentina) Federico Chingotto	6–1 / 6–3	(Italy) Facundo Dominguez (Spain) Javier Martinez Vazquez	

Women's

Date	Winners	Score	Opponent	Refs.
30/9/2025	(Spain) Lucia Martinez Gomez (Spain) Nuria Rodriguez	6–1 / 6–2	(Spain) Barbara Las Heras (Spain) Marta Arellano	
30/9/2025	(Spain) Jana Montes (Spain) Patricia Martinez Fortun	6–2 / 6–2	(Netherlands) Marcella Koek (Netherlands) Steffie Weterings	
30/9/2025	(Spain) Marina Guinart (Spain) Verónica Virseda	6–2 / 4–6 / 6–2	(Spain) Laia Rodriguez Abajo (Spain) Noa Canovas	
30/9/2025	(Spain) Alejandra Alonso (Argentina) Claudia Jensen	6–2 / 6–4	(Spain) Marta Talavan (Spain) Sofía Saiz Vallejo	
30/9/2025	(Spain) Jimena Velasco (Spain) Raquel Eugenio Barrera	4–6 / 6–0 / 6–2	(Spain) Marta Barrera (Spain) Marta Caparrós	
30/9/2025	(Argentina) Julieta Bidahorria (Spain) Lara Arruabarrena	6–4 / 7–6	(Spain) Julia Polo Bautista (Spain) Noemi Aguilar	
30/9/2025	(Spain) Jessica Castelló (Spain) Lorena Rufo	6–1 / 6–1	(Portugal) Ana Catarina Nogueira (Spain) Melania Merino	
30/9/2025	(Italy) Carolina Orsi (Argentina) Martina Fassio Goyeneche	6–4 / 6–3	(Russia) Ksenia Sharifova (Argentina) Virginia Riera	
30/9/2025	(Spain) Alejandra Salazar (Spain) Martina Calvo	6–1 / 6–1	(Spain) Carla Mesa (Spain) Sara Ruiz Soto	
30/9/2025	(Spain) Marta Ortega (Spain) Tamara Icardo	7–6 / 6–3	(Spain) Beatriz Caldera (Spain) Carmen Goenaga	
30/9/2025	(Argentina) Aranzazu Osoro (Spain) Victoria Iglesias	6–2 / 6–3	(Spain) Agueda Perez (Spain) Marta Borrero	
30/9/2025	(Spain) Lucia Sainz (Spain) Patricia Llaguno	6–2 / 6–3	(France) Alix Collombon (Spain) Araceli Martinez	

=== Round of 16 ===
Men's

Date	Winners	Score	Opponent	Refs.
2/10/2025	(Argentina) Agustín Tapia (Spain) Arturo Coello	6–3 / 6–0	(Argentina) Alex Chozas (Argentina) Leonel Aguirre	
2/10/2025	(Spain) Francisco Guerrero (Spain) Momo Gonzalez	6–3 / 6–4	(Argentina) Federico Mouriño (Argentina) Ramiro Jesus Valenzuela	
2/10/2025	(Spain) Jon Sanz (Spain) Paquito Navarro	6–2 / 7–6	(Spain) Jairo Bautista (Argentina) Valentino Libaak	
2/10/2025	(Spain) Coki Nieto (Spain) Mike Yanguas	7–6 / 6–1	(Spain) Jose García Diestro (Spain) Juanlu Esbri	
2/10/2025	(Argentina) Franco Stupaczuk (Spain) Juan Lebrón	6–3 / 7–6	(Spain) Eduardo Alonso (Argentina) Juan Tello	
2/10/2025	(Argentina) Gonzalo Alfonso (Argentina) Sanyo Gutiérrez	3–6 / 6–3 / 7–5	(Argentina) Leandro Augsburger (Argentina) Martin Di Nenno	
2/10/2025	(Spain) Javi Leal (Brazil) Lucas Bergamini	6–3 / 6–4	(Spain) Adrian Marques (Spain) Marc Sintes	
2/10/2025	(Spain) Alejandro Galán (Argentina) Federico Chingotto	7–5 / 6–4	(Spain) Alex Arroyo (United Arab Emirates) Iñigo Jofre	

Women's

Date	Winners	Score	Opponent	Refs.
2/10/2025	(Argentina) Delfina Brea (Spain) Gemma Triay	W.O.	(Spain) Lucia Martinez Gomez (Spain) Nuria Rodriguez	
1/10/2025	(Spain) Marina Guinart (Spain) Verónica Virseda	6–2 / 6–3	(Spain) Jana Montes (Spain) Patricia Martinez Fortun	
1/10/2025	(Spain) Alejandra Alonso (Argentina) Claudia Jensen	6–4 / 6–2	(Spain) Jimena Velasco (Spain) Raquel Eugenio Barrera	
2/10/2025	(Argentina) Julieta Bidahorria (Spain) Lara Arruabarrena	6–1 / 6–0	(Netherlands) Bo Luttikhuis (Netherlands) Janine Hemmes	
2/10/2025	(Spain) Andrea Ustero (Portugal) Sofia Araújo	6–3 / 6–4	(Spain) Jessica Castelló (Spain) Lorena Rufo	
1/10/2025	(Spain) Alejandra Salazar (Spain) Martina Calvo	6–3 / 6–4	(Italy) Carolina Orsi (Argentina) Martina Fassio Goyeneche	
1/10/2025	(Spain) Marta Ortega (Spain) Tamara Icardo	6–4 / 6–4	(Argentina) Aranzazu Osoro (Spain) Victoria Iglesias	
2/10/2025	(Spain) Ariana Sánchez (Spain) Paula Josemaría	6–4 / 6–1	(Spain) Lucia Sainz (Spain) Patricia Llaguno	

=== Quarter-Finals ===
Men's

Date	Winners	Score	Opponent	Refs.
3/10/2025	(Argentina) Agustín Tapia (Spain) Arturo Coello	6–2 / 6–3	(Spain) Francisco Guerrero (Spain) Momo Gonzalez	
3/10/2025	(Spain) Coki Nieto (Spain) Mike Yanguas	6–3 / 1–6 / 6–3	(Spain) Jon Sanz (Spain) Paquito Navarro	
3/10/2025	(Argentina) Franco Stupaczuk (Spain) Juan Lebrón	6–1 / 7–6	(Argentina) Gonzalo Alfonso (Argentina) Sanyo Gutiérrez	
3/10/2025	(Spain) Alejandro Galán (Argentina) Federico Chingotto	7–6 / 6–2	(Spain) Javi Leal (Brazil) Lucas Bergamini	

Women's

Date	Winners	Score	Opponent	Refs.
3/10/2025	(Argentina) Delfina Brea (Spain) Gemma Triay	6–3 / 6–1	(Spain) Marina Guinart (Spain) Verónica Virseda	
3/10/2025	(Spain) Alejandra Alonso (Argentina) Claudia Jensen	6–3 / 6–1	(Argentina) Julieta Bidahorria (Spain) Lara Arruabarrena	
3/10/2025	(Spain) Alejandra Salazar (Spain) Martina Calvo	6–3 / 6–4	(Spain) Andrea Ustero (Portugal) Sofia Araújo	
3/10/2025	(Spain) Ariana Sánchez (Spain) Paula Josemaría	6–2 / 6–3	(Spain) Marta Ortega (Spain) Tamara Icardo	

=== Semi-Finals ===
Men's

Date	Winners	Score	Opponent	Refs.
4/10/2025	(Argentina) Agustín Tapia (Spain) Arturo Coello	4–6 / 6–1 / 6–0	(Spain) Coki Nieto (Spain) Mike Yanguas	
4/10/2025	(Spain) Alejandro Galán (Argentina) Federico Chingotto	6–3 / 7–5	(Argentina) Franco Stupaczuk (Spain) Juan Lebrón	

Women's

Date	Winners	Score	Opponent	Refs.
4/10/2025	(Argentina) Delfina Brea (Spain) Gemma Triay	6–7 / 6–2 / 6–4	(Spain) Alejandra Alonso (Argentina) Claudia Jensen	
4/10/2025	(Spain) Ariana Sánchez (Spain) Paula Josemaría	6–3 / 6–2	(Spain) Alejandra Salazar (Spain) Martina Calvo	

=== Finals ===
Men's

Date	Winners	Score	Opponent	Refs.
5/10/2025	(Argentina) Agustín Tapia (Spain) Arturo Coello	6–3 / 7–6	(Spain) Alejandro Galán (Argentina) Federico Chingotto	

Women's

Date	Winners	Score	Opponent	Refs.
5/10/2025	(Argentina) Delfina Brea (Spain) Gemma Triay	6–2 / 3–6 / 6–4	(Spain) Ariana Sánchez (Spain) Paula Josemaría	
