= Premier Padel 2025 =

Professional padel season

Details
- Duration: 24 February – 22 December
- Edition: 4th
- Tournaments: 23
- Categories: Major (4); P1 (10); P2 (8); Tour Finals (1)

Achievements (singles)
- Most titles: Men (Argentina) Agustín Tapia (Spain) Arturo Coello (13); Women (Argentina) Delfina Brea (Spain) Gemma Triay (9)
- Most finals: Men (shared) (Argentina) Agustín Tapia (Spain) Arturo Coello (17) (Spain) Alejandro Galán (Argentina) Federico Chingotto (17); Women (Argentina) Delfina Brea (Spain) Gemma Triay (16)

The Premier Padel 2025 season was the fourth edition of the Premier Padel professional padel circuit.

The season was held throughout 2025 and consisted of 23 tournaments staged across 15 countries.

In the men's division, the season was defined by the battle for the number 1 spot between Agustín Tapia & Arturo Coello and Alejandro Galán & Federico Chingotto. Both pairs reached 17 finals, but Coello and Tapia secured six more titles than their rivals, ultimately retaining the number 1 ranking for the third consecutive year.

A similar scenario unfolded in the women's division, where Delfina Brea & Gemma Triay disputed the top ranking against Ariana Sánchez and Paula Josemaría. Delfina and Gemma ultimately prevailed, winning three more titles (all Majors) than their rivals and crowning themselves the new number 1s.

== Season summary ==
=== Partner and ranking changes ===
In the women's category, the number 1 and 4 ranked pairs remained together, while the world's number 2 and 3 split up. Gemma Triay teamed up with Delfina Brea, while their former partners, Bea González and Claudia Fernández, joined forces.

Similarly, in the men's category, the number 1 and 2 pairs remained unchanged, while Juan Lebrón parted ways with Martín Di Nenno to play with Franco Stupaczuk, forming the number 3 ranked pair. Di Nenno teamed up with Javi Garrido. Meanwhile, Mike Yanguas joined forces with Coki Nieto, rounding out the top four.

=== First tournament of the season ===
Just like last season, the first ranked pairs in the men's and women's divisions opened the season by winning the Riyadh tournament, this time against the number 3 seeds. This victory also marked the 30th tournament title for Agustín Tapia and Arturo Coello, achieved in just 39 finals played as a pair.

=== March ===
The next two tournaments were marked by the absence of top-100 male players, who represented by the PPA, were in a dispute with the FIP and Premier Padel, with only Franco Stupaczuk & Juan Lebrón participating and winning the second event. However in the women's category, with all athletes present, Delfina Brea and Gemma Triay began a strong run, defeating Ariana & Paula Josemaria in Gijón and Marta Ortega & Sofia Araújo in Cancún.

During the remainder of March, Alejandro Galán & Federico Chingotto would win the Miami and Santiago P1 tournaments, both times defeating Lebrón and Stupaczuk, while Delfina & Gemma and Ariana & Paula faced each other in both finals; the world number twos won the first, and the second ended in a draw with no winner due to weather conditions.

The victory by Lebrón & Stupaczuk over Coello & Tapia in the Miami semifinals also marked the first time in 11 months that Coello & Tapia failed to reach a tournament final, the last time being the Seville P2 on May 4, 2024. Meanwhile, with their win, Chingotto & Galán ended a 259-day trophy drought that had lasted since the Genoa P2 in July 2024.

=== April and May ===
April and May were marked by clashes between the top two pairs in the men's and women's divisions. Coello & Tapia defeated 'ChinGalán' in their first and second encounters, but could not reach the finals in Asúncion with Chingotto & Galán defeating against Pablo Cardona & Leo Augsburger, while Delfina & Gemma beat Ariana & Paula at the Qatar Major but were defeated by the world number 1s at the Brussels P2, and also lost at the Asunción P2, this time to the number 3 pair, Bea González & Claudia Fernández.

By achieving a better result than her rivals in Asunción, Gemma Triay reclaimed the world number one ranking after two years.

=== June ===
Throughout June, Coello & Tapia reached every final, winning the Buenos Aires P1 and the Valladolid P2, securing their 34th title and surpassing the Galán/Lebrón duo (who had won 33 titles), but also losing the month's second final at the Italy Major to "ChinGalán." With that victory, Galán & Chingotto ended the losing streak against Coello & Tapia that had spanned nine consecutive finals and 343 days without a win over the world number ones.

On the women's circuit, the top ranking changed hands over the course of the month's tournaments: Ariana & Paula defeated Bea & Cláudia in both Buenos Aires and Valladolid, but also lost to Delfina & Gemma in Italy.

=== July ===
In the three remaining tournaments before the summer break, the Italian men's final match was repeated in all of the tournaments. Coello & Tapia won all three events, in Bordeaux P2, Málaga P1, and Tarragona P1, becoming the second most successful pair of all time with 37 tournament won and extending their head-to-head record against the world number twos to 15–6.

On the women's side, no single pair managed to repeat their tournament victory: the newly formed number 4 pair of Andrea Ustero & Sofia Araújo won in Bordeaux (with Ustero becoming the youngest-ever winner of a padel tournament); Bea González triumphed on home soil alongside Claudia Fernández; and Delfina Brea & Gemma Triay defeated Ariana Sánchez & Paula Josemaría in the Tarragona final, becoming the new number 1 ranked pair.

=== Final part of the season ===
==== September–October ====
The return from the summer break brought two surprises at the Madrid P1. On the men's side, Leandro Augsburger & Martín Di Nenno eliminated Chingotto & Galán in the quarterfinals and Lebrón & Stupaczuk in the semifinals, on their road to the finals where they would defeat Coello and Tapia and become the first pair outside the top 3 to win a title in 2025. Meanwhile, on the women's side, Bea González & Claudia Fernández defeated Delfina & Gemma to claim their third title of the season.

In the following four tournaments, the top two men's pairs once again dominated, facing each other in every final. Coello & Tapia won the Paris Major and the Rotterdam P1, while Galán & Chingotto claimed the Germany P2 and the Milan P1. With these victories, Tapia & Coello not only reached the milestone of 40 titles together but also surpassed the 92% win rate held by Fernando Belasteguín and Juan Martín Díaz (the most successful pair in padel history) by hitting the 93% mark.

Meanwhile, Delfina & Gemma would continue their strong run of form with victories in Paris, Germany, and Rotterdam, while Ariana & Paula would end a 105-day title drought by winning the Milan P1, keeping alive their hopes of finishing the year at the top of the rankings.

==== November–December ====
November began with the number 2 pairs, on both men's and women's divisions, winning the Giza P2 and the FIP Pairs World Cup, putting pressure in the battle for the number 1 ranking.

However, in the following two tournaments, Coello & Tapia and Delfina & Gemma increased the gap once more, effectively sealing the race for the number 1 spot. Coello and Tapia achieved this by defeating Chingotto & Galán in the finals of the Dubai P1 and the Mexico Major, while despiste Delfina & Gemma losing both finals to Bea González & Claudia Fernández, they earned enough points to guarantee finishing the year at number 1.

The finals seen in Dubai and Mexico were repeated at the Premier Padel Finals, with Coello & Tapia once again defeating Chingotto & Galán, while Bea & Claudia, in their final tournament as a team, defeated the already crowned world number 1s, Delfina and Gemma.

== Points distribution ==
Below is a series of tables showing the FIP ranking points a player can earn in Premier Padel tournaments.

=== Men's Points ===
Event	First Round	Second Round	Last Qualy	Bonus Qualy	Round of 64	Round of 32	Round of 16	QF	SF	F	W
Major		15	30	15	35	90	180	360	720	1200	2000
P1			18	10	22	45	90	180	360	600	1000
P2		7	15	5		22	45	90	180	360	600
Tour Finals									270 to 600	900	1500

=== Women's Points ===
Event	First Round	Second Round	Last Qualy	Bonus Qualy	Round of 64	Round of 32	Round of 16	QF	SF	F	W
Major			30	15	35	90	180	360	720	1200	2000
P1			18	10		45	90	180	360	600	1000
P2			15	5		22	45	90	180	360	600
Tour Finals									270 to 600	900	1500

== Tournaments and results ==
Major P1 P2 Premier Padel Finals

Tournaments

Tournament	Date	Men's			Women's		
Tournament	Date	Winners	Score	Runners-up	Winners	Score	Runners-up
(Saudi Arabia) Riyadh P1	10 – 15 February	(Argentina) Agustín Tapia (Spain) Arturo Coello	6–3 / 5–7 / 6–3	(Argentina) Franco Stupaczuk (Spain) Juan Lebrón	(Spain) Ariana Sánchez (Spain) Paula Josemaría	W.O.	(Spain) Bea González (Spain) Claudia Fernández
(Spain) Gijón P2	24 February – 2 March	(Spain) Francisco Cabeza (Spain) Diego García	7–5 / 4–6 / 6–3	(Argentina) Gonzalo Alfonso (Argentina) Leonel Aguirre	(Argentina) Delfina Brea (Spain) Gemma Triay	0–6 / 6–1 / 6–4	(Spain) Ariana Sánchez (Spain) Paula Josemaría
(Mexico) Cancún P2	10 – 16 March	(Argentina) Franco Stupaczuk (Spain) Juan Lebrón	6–2 / 6–3	(Argentina) Gonzalo Alfonso (Argentina) Leonel Aguirre	(Argentina) Delfina Brea (Spain) Gemma Triay	6–3 / 6–1	(Spain) Marta Ortega (Portugal) Sofia Araujo
(United States) Miami P1	17 – 23 March	(Spain) Alejandro Galán (Argentina) Federico Chingotto	6–1 / 7–6	(Argentina) Franco Stupaczuk (Spain) Juan Lebrón	(Argentina) Delfina Brea (Spain) Gemma Triay	2–6 / 6–1 / 6–4	(Spain) Ariana Sánchez (Spain) Paula Josemaría
(Chile) Santiago P1	24 – 30 March	(Spain) Alejandro Galán (Argentina) Federico Chingotto	W.O.	(Argentina) Franco Stupaczuk (Spain) Juan Lebrón	The final had Ariana Sánchez and Paula Josemaría against Delfina Brea and Gemma Triay, but the match was postponed due to rain and ended up being suspended, with a score of 4–6 / 7–6		
Qatar Major	14 – 19 April	(Argentina) Agustín Tapia (Spain) Arturo Coello	7–6 / 6–2	(Spain) Alejandro Galán (Argentina) Federico Chingotto	(Argentina) Delfina Brea (Spain) Gemma Triay	6–4 / 6–4	(Spain) Ariana Sánchez (Spain) Paula Josemaría
(Belgium) Brussels P2	20 – 27 April	(Argentina) Agustín Tapia (Spain) Arturo Coello	2–6 / 6–4 / 6–1	(Spain) Alejandro Galán (Argentina) Federico Chingotto	(Spain) Ariana Sánchez (Spain) Paula Josemaría	6–2 / 6–4	(Argentina) Delfina Brea (Spain) Gemma Triay
(Paraguay) Asunción P2	19 – 25 May	(Spain) Alejandro Galán (Argentina) Federico Chingotto	7–6 / 6–1	(Spain) Pablo Cardona (Argentina) Leo Augsburger	(Spain) Bea González (Spain) Claudia Fernández	7–6 / 3–6 / 6–2	(Argentina) Delfina Brea (Spain) Gemma Triay
(Argentina) Buenos Aires P1	26 May – 1 June	(Argentina) Agustín Tapia (Spain) Arturo Coello	6–2 / 6–2	(Brazil) Lucas Bergamini (Spain) Paquito Navarro	(Spain) Ariana Sánchez (Spain) Paula Josemaría	6–2 / 6–2	(Spain) Bea González (Spain) Claudia Fernández
Italy Major	9 – 15 June	(Spain) Alejandro Galán (Argentina) Federico Chingotto	6–3 / 7–5	(Argentina) Agustín Tapia (Spain) Arturo Coello	(Argentina) Delfina Brea (Spain) Gemma Triay	6–4 / 6–4	(Spain) Ariana Sánchez (Spain) Paula Josemaría
(Spain) Valladolid P2	23 – 29 June	(Argentina) Agustín Tapia (Spain) Arturo Coello	7–5 / 6–4	(Argentina) Franco Stupaczuk (Spain) Juan Lebrón	(Spain) Ariana Sánchez (Spain) Paula Josemaría	6–4 / 7–5	(Spain) Bea González (Spain) Claudia Fernández
(France) Bordeaux P2	30 June – 6 July	(Argentina) Agustín Tapia (Spain) Arturo Coello	7–6 / 6–4	(Spain) Alejandro Galán (Argentina) Federico Chingotto	(Spain) Andrea Ustero (Portugal) Sofia Araujo	7–5 / 2–6 / 6–2	(Spain) Beatriz Caldera (Spain) Carmen Goenaga
(Spain) Málaga P1	14 – 20 July	(Argentina) Agustín Tapia (Spain) Arturo Coello	6–4 / 7–5	(Spain) Alejandro Galán (Argentina) Federico Chingotto	(Spain) Bea González (Spain) Claudia Fernández	6–2 / 6–1	(Spain) Marta Ortega (Spain) Tamara Icardo
(Spain) Tarragona P1	28 July – 3 August	(Argentina) Agustín Tapia (Spain) Arturo Coello	7–6 / 7–5	(Spain) Alejandro Galán (Argentina) Federico Chingotto	(Argentina) Delfina Brea (Spain) Gemma Triay	7–6 / 6–4	(Spain) Ariana Sánchez (Spain) Paula Josemaría
(Spain) Madrid P1	1 – 7 September	(Argentina) Leandro Augsburger (Argentina) Martín Di Nenno	4–6 / 6–3 / 6–4	(Argentina) Agustín Tapia (Spain) Arturo Coello	(Spain) Bea González (Spain) Claudia Fernández	3–6 / 6–1 / 6–4	(Argentina) Delfina Brea (Spain) Gemma Triay
(France) Paris Major	8 – 14 September	(Argentina) Agustín Tapia (Spain) Arturo Coello	6–1 / 6–4	(Spain) Alejandro Galán (Argentina) Federico Chingotto	(Argentina) Delfina Brea (Spain) Gemma Triay	7–5 / 6–2	(Spain) Marta Ortega (Spain) Tamara Icardo
Germany P2	22 – 28 September	(Spain) Alejandro Galán (Argentina) Federico Chingotto	7–6 / 6–2	(Argentina) Agustín Tapia (Spain) Arturo Coello	(Argentina) Delfina Brea (Spain) Gemma Triay	6–4 / 4–6 / 6–3	(Spain) Ariana Sánchez (Spain) Paula Josemaría
(Netherlands) Rotterdam P1	29 September – 5 October	(Argentina) Agustín Tapia (Spain) Arturo Coello	6–3 / 7–6	(Spain) Alejandro Galán (Argentina) Federico Chingotto	(Argentina) Delfina Brea (Spain) Gemma Triay	6–2 / 3–6 / 6–4	(Spain) Ariana Sánchez (Spain) Paula Josemaría
(Italy) Milan P1	6 – 12 October	(Spain) Alejandro Galán (Argentina) Federico Chingotto	2–6 / 6–3 / 6–0	(Argentina) Agustín Tapia (Spain) Arturo Coello	(Spain) Ariana Sánchez (Spain) Paula Josemaría	6–2 / 6–4	(Spain) Bea González (Spain) Claudia Fernández
(Egypt) NewGiza P2	27 October – 1 November	(Spain) Alejandro Galán (Argentina) Federico Chingotto	6–1 / 6–2	(Spain) Jon Sanz (Spain) Paquito Navarro	(Spain) Ariana Sánchez (Spain) Paula Josemaría	6–3 / 6–0	(Spain) Alejandra Salazar (Spain) Martina Calvo
(United Arab Emirates) Dubai P1	10 – 16 November	(Argentina) Agustín Tapia (Spain) Arturo Coello	6–3 / 6–4	(Spain) Alejandro Galán (Argentina) Federico Chingotto	(Spain) Bea González (Spain) Claudia Fernández	6–1 / 7–5	(Argentina) Delfina Brea (Spain) Gemma Triay
Mexico Major	24 – 30 November	(Argentina) Agustín Tapia (Spain) Arturo Coello	6–4 / 7–6	(Spain) Alejandro Galán (Argentina) Federico Chingotto	(Spain) Bea González (Spain) Claudia Fernández	6–2 / 6–4	(Argentina) Delfina Brea (Spain) Gemma Triay
(Spain) Premier Padel Finals	8 – 14 December	(Argentina) Agustín Tapia (Spain) Arturo Coello	6–7 /6–3 / 7–6	(Spain) Alejandro Galán (Argentina) Federico Chingotto	(Spain) Bea González (Spain) Claudia Fernández	6–4 / 0–6 / 6–2	(Argentina) Delfina Brea (Spain) Gemma Triay

== End of year ranking ==
Male

2025 Men's Ranking			Tournaments Won				
N.º	Name	Points	P2	P1	Majors	Finals	Total
1	(Argentina) Agustín Tapia	19800	3	6	3	1	13
1	(Spain) Arturo Coello	19800	3	6	3	1	13
3	(Spain) Alejandro Galán	17320	3	3	1	0	7
3	(Argentina) Federico Chingotto	17320	3	3	1	0	7
5	(Argentina) Franco Stupaczuk	7905	1	0	0	0	1
6	(Spain) Juan Lebrón	7845	1	0	0	0	1
7	(Spain) Coki Nieto	6322	0	0	0	0	0
7	(Spain) Miguel Yanguas	6322	0	0	0	0	0
9	(Spain) Paquito Navarro	6115	0	0	0	0	0
10	(Argentina) Leandro Augsburger	5155	0	1	0	0	1
11	(Spain) Jon Sanz	5125	0	0	0	0	0
12	(Argentina) Martín Di Nenno	5110	0	1	0	0	1
13	(Brazil) Lucas Bergamini	4550	0	0	0	0	0
14	(Spain) Francisco Guerrero	4410	0	0	0	0	0
15	(Spain) Momo González	4350	0	0	0	0	0
16	(Spain) Javier Leal	3665	0	0	0	0	0

Female

2025 Women's Ranking			Tournaments Won				
N.º	Name	Points	P2	P1	Majors	Finals	Total
1	(Argentina) Delfina Brea	18060	3	3	3	0	9
1	(Spain) Gemma Triay	18060	3	3	3	0	9
3	(Spain) Paula Josemaría	14720	3	3	0	0	6
3	(Spain) Ariana Sánchez	14720	3	3	0	0	6
5	(Spain) Beatriz González	13040	1	3	1	1	6
5	(Spain) Claudia Fernández	13040	1	3	1	1	6
7	(Portugal) Sofia Araújo	7030	1	0	0	0	1
8	(Spain) Andrea Ustero	6625	1	0	0	0	1
9	(Spain) Marta Ortega	6435	0	0	0	0	0
10	(Spain) Tamara Icardo	6050	0	0	0	0	0
11	(Argentina) Claudia Jensen	5405	0	0	0	0	0
12	(Spain) Alejandra Alonso	5385	0	0	0	0	0
13	(Spain) Alejandra Salazar	5110	0	0	0	0	0
14	(Spain) Martina Calvo Santamaria	4745	0	0	0	0	0
15	(Spain) Verónica Virseda	4190	0	0	0	0	0
16	(Spain) Marina Guinart	4035	0	0	0	0	0
