= 2025 Gijón P2 =

Padel championships

- Date: 24 February – 2 March
- Edition: 1st
- Category: P2
- Prize money: €252.250
- Location: Gijón, Spain
- Venue: Palacio de Deportes de Gijón

Champions
- Men's doubles: (Spain) Francisco Cabeza (Spain) Diego García
- Women's doubles: (Argentina) Delfina Brea (Spain) Gemma Triay

Chronology

The 2025 Riyadh P1 (officially 2025 Riyadh Season Premier Padel P1) was the second tournament of the fourth season organized by Premier Padel, the premier padel circuit, promoted by the International Padel Federation, and with the financial backing of Nasser Al-Khelaïfi's Qatar Sports Investments.

In the women's category, the top two seeded pairs in the International Padel Federation (FIP) rankings reached the final. Delfina Brea and Gemma Triay, playing in their second tournament together, defeated the world number ones, Ariana Sánchez and Paula Josemaría, to claim their first trophy as a team.

In the men's category, with no players from the FIP top 50 competing in the tournament, Spaniards Francisco Cabeza and Diego García defeated the Argentine pair of Gonzalo Alfonso and Leonel Aguirre to be crowned champions.

== Relevant Data ==
Due to disagreements between the Professional Padel Players Association (Asociación Profesional de Jugadores de Pádel (PPA)) and the circuit, no athlete from the men's top 100 registered for the tournament, opting instead to boycott it. This boycott by leading players stemmed from dissatisfaction with several decisions made by Premier Padel. The main issues included the reduction of the number of pairs in tournament draws (by eight pairs), lower prize money for lower-ranked pairs, and the requirement that qualifying rounds, which offered no prize money, be played in the host countries, forcing players to pay high expenses.

Premier Padel, through a letter sent by the law firm Cuatrecasas, issued a communication to the players containing a veiled threat of legal action. "As you can imagine, a collective boycott of a tournament by all players is an extremely serious matter, without parallel in any other professional sport. From a legal standpoint, it is a very serious issue. There is a difference between an individual player's freedom to decide whether or not to participate in a tournament and a joint, global boycott by all players aimed solely at preventing participation and competition."

Pablo Cardona commentend:

"Focusing on the sporting side, what the PPA is asking for is to be heard and to have some say in decisions, rather than simply acting as a consultative body for resolutions adopted by Premier Padel and the FIP.", adding "We want a say in the entire ranking points system and the number of tournaments that count toward it. Currently, it's 22, and we want to lower that figure. There are ten Platinum tournaments awarding 300 points and many Gold ones offering 150", talking about the reduction in draw sizes he addded: "They are smaller now. Fewer people get into the qualifying rounds, and there are double byes in the P1 events. I think these are things we need to change because it isn't good for padel. With the current system, you neither protect top players, given the excessive number of matches and injury risks, nor give mid-ranked or young players the chance to break in. The Cupra FIP Tour needs to be the gateway to Premier Padel, but if top pairs drop down due to ranking requirements, you don't give them the option to play."

The Municipal Sports Board and the City Council of Gijón confirmed that the event would go ahead, confirming that the contracts would be renegotiated:

"We regret the situation that has unfolded in recent days regarding the registration of certain players in the men's draw. The City Council supports the position of the organizing company and will not comment on the reasons behind this decision, as it had no involvement in the matter.- We are currently renegotiating the terms of the sponsorship with the organizing company, and these terms remain subject to change."

During the tournament, Premier Padel sent a letter to the players, accuseing the PPA of "repeated contractual breaches over recent months regarding essential aspects of the LFA, affecting both minimum sports participation obligations and other matters of an economic nature. This situation is extremely serious and renders the current conditions unsustainable. Premier Padel is strictly fulfilling its obligations, whereas the PPA repeatedly disregards its commitments as a pressure tactic to achieve other objectives." Adding that in response to the boycott, Premier Padel would freeze payments intended for the PPA of the distribution of the Bonus Pool from previous seasons, including 2024. "Until the current breaches are fully and definitively remedied, we are proceeding to withhold the payments Premier Padel is required to make to the PPA under the LFA, specifically, among others, the Bonus Pool."

With their victory in the men's category, Fran Cabeza and Diego García became the youngest pair of all time to win a Premier Padel tournament.

== Seeds ==
Male

Rnk.	Team	FIP Ranking Points
1	(Spain) Jaume Romera Barcelo (Italy) Simone Cremona	743
2	(Italy) Lorenzo Di Giovanni (Italy) Simone Iacovino	595
3	(Argentina) Gonzalo Alfonso (Argentina) Leonel Aguirre	490
4	(Argentina) Julian Lacamoire (Egypt) Youssef Hossam	402
5	(Spain) Boris Castro Garcia (Italy) Enzo Jensen	401
6	(Italy) Emiliano Iriart (Italy) Mauro Salandro	398
7	(Mexico) Diego Arredondo Garcia (Argentina) Manuel Gayone	356
8	(Netherlands) Bram Meijer (Netherlands) Sten Richters	355
9	(Spain) Alejandro Caton (Portugal) Henrique Barbosa	330
10	(Italy) Daniele Cattaneo (Spain) Pau Miñano Ortinez	320
11	(Spain) Diego García (Spain) Francisco Cabeza Teres	265
12	(Chile) Cristobal Martinez (Argentina) Pablo Molina Tofanelli	262
13	(Paraguay) Facundo Dehnike (Spain) Manuel Aragon Herrera	248
14	(Portugal) João Maria Caiano (Netherlands) Thijs Roper	234
15	(Spain) Miguel Melero Bernal (Italy) Pier Giulio Farabbi	218
16	(Netherlands) Julian Prins (Netherlands) Youp De Kroon	203

Female

Rnk.	Team	FIP Ranking Points
1	(Spain) Ariana Sánchez (Spain) Paula Josemaria	34300
2	(Argentina) Delfina Brea (Spain) Gemma Triay	23840
3	(Spain) Bea González (Spain) Claudia Fernandéz	21890
4	(Spain) Marta Ortega (Portugal) Sofia Araújo	14270
5	(Spain) Lucia Sainz (Spain) Patricia Llaguno	10960
6	(Spain) Alejandra Salazar (Spain) Veronica Virseda	10555
7	(Argentina) Claudia Jensen (Spain) Tamara Icardo	9920
8	(Argentina) Aranzazu Osoro (Spain) Jessica Castello	9845
9	(Spain) Alejandra Alonso (Spain) Andrea Ustero	9570
10	(Spain) Marta Marrero (Argentina) Virginia Riera	4804
11	(Spain) Beatriz Caldera (Spain) Carmen Goenaga	4590
12	(Spain) Marina Guinart (Spain) Victoria Iglesias	4013
13	(Italy) Carolina Orsi (Spain) Nuria Rodriguez	3671
14	(France) Alix Collombon (Spain) Araceli Martinez	3646
15	(Russia) Ksenia Sharifova (Spain) Marta Talavan	3549
16	(Spain) Lara Arruabarrena (Spain) Lorena Rufo	3374

== Head-to-head record between teams ranked in the top 4 during the season ==
=== Man's ===
Record	Coello–Tapia	Galán–Chingotto	Lebrón–Stupaczuk	Coki–Yanguas
Coello–Tapia	—	—	1–0	1–0
Galán–Chingotto	—	—	—	—
Lebrón–Stupaczuk	0–1	—	—	—
Coki–Yanguas	0–1	—	—	—

=== Women's ===
Record	Ariana–Paula	D. Brea–Triay	Gonzalez–Fernandez	Araújo–Ortega
Ariana–Paula	—	0–1	1–0	1–0
D. Brea–Triay	1–0	—	0–1	1–0
Gonzalez–Fernandez	0–1	1–0	—	—
Araújo–Ortega	0–1	0–1	—	—

== Draws ==
=== Men's Bracket ===
Round of 32
1	(Spain) J. Barcelo / (Italy) S. Cremona
Bye
9	(Spain) A. Calvo / (Portugal) H. Barbosa	7	6
WC	(Spain) A. Trabanco / (Spain) P. Gonzalez	6	3
15	(Spain) M. Bernal / (Italy) P. Farabbi	3	4
14	(Portugal) J. Caiano / (Netherlands) T. Roper	6	6
20	(Spain) A. Ramos / (Spain) K. Vidal	6	6
6	(Italy) E. Iriart / (Italy) M. Salandro	3	1
7	(Mexico) D. Garcia / (Argentina) M. Gayone	3	4
Q	(Netherlands) M. Nolten / (France) P. Raichman	6	6
LL	(France) S. Wagner / (France) T. Vanbauce	6	1	3
21	(Spain) P. Landaburu / (Spain) S. Garcia	4	6	6
Q	(Italy) M. Platania / (Italy) M. Sargolini	5	2
12	(Chile) C. Martinez / (Argentina) P. Tofanelli	7	6
Bye
3	(Argentina) G. Alfonso / (Argentina) L. Aguirre
4	(Argentina) J. Lacamoire / (Egypt) Y. Hossam
Bye
Q	(Spain) J. Perez / (Paraguay) M. San Martin	6	6
WC	(Spain) A. Campos / (Spain) M. Martinez	3	4
13	(Paraguay) F. Dehnike / (Spain) M. Herrera	6	6
16	(Netherlands) J. Prins / (Netherlands) Y. De Kroon	3	1
18	(Qatar) A. Alhijji / (Qatar) M. Alkuwari	2	0
5	(Spain) B. Garcia / (Italy) E. Jensen	6	6
8	(Netherlands) B. Meijer / (Netherlands) S. Richters	7	5	6
10	(Italy) D. Cattaneo / (Spain) P. Ortinez	6	7	2
Q	(Sweden) A. Olsson / (Sweden) D. Rutgersson	1	2
11	(Spain) F. Cabeza / (Spain) D. Garcia	6	6
22	(Portugal) D. Jesus / (Spain) S. Aznar	6	6
19	(Argentina) A. Guevara / (Portugal) A. Meireles	2	2
Bye
2	(Italy) L. Di Giovanni / (Italy) S. Iacovino

Round of 16
1	(Spain) J. Barcelo / (Italy) S. Cremona	6	6
9	(Spain) A. Calvo / (Portugal) H. Barbosa	2	4
14	(Portugal) J. Caiano / (Netherlands) T. Roper	5	6	6
20	(Spain) A. Ramos / (Spain) K. Vidal	7	2	4
Q	(Netherlands) M. Nolten / (France) P. Raichman	6	4	6
21	(Spain) P. Landaburu / (Spain) S. Garcia	3	6	3
12	(Chile) C. Martinez / (Argentina) P. Tofanelli	3	1
3	(Argentina) G. Alfonso / (Argentina) L. Aguirre	6	6
4	(Argentina) J. Lacamoire / (Egypt) Y. Hossam	7	4	6
Q	(Spain) J. Perez / (Paraguay) M. San Martin	5	6	4
13	(Paraguay) F. Dehnike / (Spain) M. Herrera	6	6
5	(Spain) B. Garcia / (Italy) E. Jensen	4	4
8	(Netherlands) B. Meijer / (Netherlands) S. Richters	2	3
11	(Spain) F. Cabeza / (Spain) D. Garcia	6	6
22	(Portugal) D. Jesus / (Spain) S. Aznar	6	3
2	(Italy) L. Di Giovanni / (Italy) S. Iacovino	7	6

Quarter-Final
1	(Spain) J. Barcelo / (Italy) S. Cremona	6	6	6
4	(Portugal) J. Caiano / (Netherlands) T. Roper	0	7	3
Q	(Netherlands) M. Nolten / (France) P. Raichman	1	0
3	(Argentina) G. Alfonso / (Argentina) L. Aguirre	6	1	*
4	(Argentina) J. Lacamoire / (Egypt) Y. Hossam	3	7	3
13	(Paraguay) F. Dehnike / (Spain) M. Herrera	6	6	6
11	(Spain) F. Cabeza / (Spain) D. Garcia	7	6
2	(Italy) L. Di Giovanni / (Italy) S. Iacovino	6	2

Semi-Finals
1	(Spain) J. Barcelo / (Italy) S. Cremona	4	6
3	(Argentina) G. Alfonso / (Argentina) L. Aguirre	6	7
13	(Paraguay) F. Dehnike / (Spain) M. Herrera	4	4
11	(Spain) F. Cabeza / (Spain) D. Garcia	6	6

Finals
1	(Spain) J. Barcelo / (Italy) S. Cremona	5	6	3
13	(Spain) F. Cabeza / (Spain) D. Garcia	7	4	6

=== Women's Bracket ===
Round of 32
1	(Spain) A. Sánchez / (Spain) P. Josemaria
Bye
Q	(Spain) N. Aguilar / (Spain) T. Navarro	1	1
12	(Spain) M. Guinart / (Spain) V. Iglesias	6	6
17	(Spain) J. Velasco / (Spain) N. Canovas	2	4
18	(Italy) G. Marchetti / (Spain) S. Ruiz	6	6
Bye
6	(Spain) A. Salazar / (Spain) V. Virseda
5	(Spain) L. Sainz / (Spain) P. Llaguno
Bye
19	(Spain) M. Barrera / (Spain) M. Caparrós	2	1
9	(Spain) A. Alonso / (Spain) A. Ustero	6	6
11	(Spain) B. Caldera / (Spain) C. Goenaga	6	6
10	(Spain) M. Marrero / (Argentina) V. Riera	3	2
Bye
3	(Spain) B. Gonzalez / (Spain) C. Fernandez
4	(Spain) M. Ortega / (Portugal) S. Araújo
Bye
15	(Russia) K. Sharifova / (Spain) M. Talavan	5	4
13	(Italy) C. Orsi / (Spain) N. Rodriguez	7	6
16	(Spain) L. Arruabarrena / (Spain) L. Rufo	0	6	6
14	(France) A. Collombon / (Spain) A. Martinez	6	3	1
Bye
8	(Argentina) A. Osoro / (Spain) J. Castelló
7	(Argentina) C. Jensen / (Spain) T. Icardo
Bye
Q	(Spain) M. Lobo / (Spain) S. Saiz	3	4
Q	(Portugal) A. Nogueira / (Argentina) M. Goyeneche	6	6
WC	(Spain) C. Cidoncha / (Spain) C. Castro	3	2
Q	(Spain) M.R. Abajo / R. Barrera	6	6
Bye
2	(Argentina) D. Brea / (Spain) G. Triay

Round of 16
1	(Spain) A. Sánchez / (Spain) P. Josemaria	7	6
12	(Spain) M. Guinart / (Spain) V. Iglesias	6	4
18	(Italy) G. Marchetti / (Spain) S. Ruiz	3	7	0
6	(Spain) A. Salazar / (Spain) V. Virseda	6	5	6
5	(Spain) L. Sainz / (Spain) P. Llaguno	4	4
9	(Spain) A. Alonso / (Spain) A. Ustero	6	6
11	(Spain) B. Caldera / (Spain) C. Goenaga	2	4
3	(Spain) B. Gonzalez / (Spain) C. Fernandez	6	6
4	(Spain) M. Ortega / (Portugal) S. Araújo	6	3	6
13	(Italy) C. Orsi / (Spain) N. Rodriguez	2	6	1
16	(Spain) L. Arruabarrena / (Spain) L. Rufo	1	1
8	(Argentina) A. Osoro / (Spain) J. Castelló	6	6
7	(Argentina) C. Jensen / (Spain) T. Icardo	6	6
Q	(Portugal) A. Nogueira / (Argentina) M. Goyeneche	0	0
Q	(Spain) M.R. Abajo / R. Barrera	4	2
2	(Argentina) D. Brea / (Spain) G. Triay	6	6

Quarter-Final
1	(Spain) A. Sánchez / (Spain) P. Josemaria	6	6
6	(Spain) A. Salazar / (Spain) V. Virseda	3	2
9	(Spain) A. Alonso / (Spain) A. Ustero	6	6
3	(Spain) B. Gonzalez / (Spain) C. Fernandez	2	4
4	(Spain) M. Ortega / (Portugal) S. Araújo	6	7
8	(Argentina) A. Osoro / (Spain) J. Castelló	2	5
7	(Argentina) C. Jensen / (Spain) T. Icardo	7	0	3
2	(Argentina) D. Brea / (Spain) G. Triay	5	6	6

Semi-Finals
1	(Spain) A. Sánchez / (Spain) P. Josemaria	6	6
9	(Spain) A. Alonso / (Spain) A. Ustero	1	4
4	(Spain) M. Ortega / (Portugal) S. Araújo	1	3
2	(Argentina) D. Brea / (Spain) G. Triay	6	6

Finals
1	(Spain) A. Sánchez / (Spain) P. Josemaria	6	1	4
2	(Argentina) D. Brea / (Spain) G. Triay	0	6	6

== Results ==
=== Round of 32 ===
Men's

Date	Winners	Score	Opponent	Refs.
26/2/2025	(Spain) Alejandro Caton Calvo (Portugal) Henrique Barbosa	7–6 / 6–3	(Spain) Alberto Trabanco (Spain) Pablo Gonzalez	
26/2/2025	(Portugal) Joao Maria Caiano (Netherlands) Thijs Roper	6–3 / 6–4	(Spain) Miguel Melero Bernal (Italy) Pier Giulio Farabbi	
26/2/2025	(Spain) Antonio Varo Ramos (Spain) Karlos Rodriguez Vidal	6–3 / 6–1	(Italy) Emiliano Iriart (Italy) Mauro Salandro	
26/2/2025	(Netherlands) Menno Nolten (France) Philemon Raichman	6–3 / 6–4	(Mexico) Diego Arredondo (Argentina) Manuel Gayone	
26/2/2025	(Spain) Pablo Pastor (Spain) Samuel Rivas García	4–6 / 6–1 / 6–3	(France) Simon Wagner (France) Thomas Vanbauce	
26/2/2025	(Chile) Cristobal Martinez (Argentina) Pablo Molina	7–5 / 6–2	(Italy) Matteo Platania (Italy) Matteo Sargolini	
26/2/2025	(Spain) Juan Zamora Perez (Paraguay) Mariano Gonzalez	6–3 / 6–4	(Spain) Alvaro Lopez Campos (Spain) Marc Lupon	
26/2/2025	(Paraguay) Facundo Dehnike (Spain) Manuel Aragon	6–3 / 6–1	(Netherlands) Julian Prins (Netherlands) Youp De Kroon	
26/2/2025	(Spain) Boris Castro García (Italy) Enzo Jensen	6–2 / 6–0	(Qatar) Abdulla Alhijji (Qatar) Mohammed Saadon Alkuwari	
26/2/2025	(Netherlands) Bram Meijer (Netherlands) Sten Richters	7–6 / 5–7 / 6–2	(Italy) Daniele Cattaneo (Spain) Pau Miñano Ortinez	
26/2/2025	(Spain) Diego García (Spain) Francisco Cabeza	6–1 / 6–2	(Sweden) Albin Olson (Sweden) Douglas Rutgersson	
26/2/2025	(Portugal) Diogo Jesus (Spain) Sergio Arias	6–2 / 6–2	(Argentina) Axel Guevara (Portugal) Zé Alexandre Meireles	

Women's

Date	Winners	Score	Opponent	Refs.
26/2/2025	(Spain) Marina Guinart (Spain) Victoria Iglesias	6–1 / 6–1	(Spain) Noemi Aguilar (Spain) Teresa Navarro	
26/2/2025	(Italy) Giorgia Marchetti (Spain) Sara Ruiz	6–2 / 6–2	(Spain) Jimena Velasco (Spain) Noa Canovas	
26/2/2025	(Spain) Alejandra Alonso (Spain) Andrea Ustero	6–2 / 6–1	(Spain) Marta Barrera (Spain) Marta Caparrós	
26/2/2025	(Spain) Beatriz Caldera (Spain) Carmen Goenaga	6–3 / 6–2	(Spain) Marta Marrero (Argentina) Virginia Riera	
26/2/2025	(Italy) Carolina Orsi (Spain) Nuria Rodriguez	7–5 / 6–4	(Russia) Ksenia Sharifova (Spain) Marta Talavan	
26/2/2025	(Spain) Lara Arruabarrena (Spain) Lorena Rufo	0–6 / 6–3 / 6–1	(France) Alix Collombon (Spain) Araceli Martinez	
26/2/2025	(Portugal) Ana Catarina Nogueira (Argentina) Martina Fassio Goyeneche	6–3 / 6–4	(Spain) Marina Martinez Lobo (Spain) Sofía Saiz Vallejo	
26/2/2025	(Spain) Coral Alvarez Castro (Spain) Cristina Gonzalez Cidoncha	6–3 / 6–2	(Spain) Laia Rodriguez Abajo (Spain) Raquel Eugenio Barrera	

=== Round of 16 ===
Men's

Date	Winners	Score	Opponent	Refs.
27/2/2025	(Spain) Jaume Romera Barcelo (Italy) Simone Cremona	6–2 / 6–4	(Spain) Alejandro Caton Calvo (Portugal) Henrique Barbosa	
27/2/2025	(Portugal) Joao Maria Caiano (Netherlands) Thijs Roper	5–7 / 6–2 / 6–4	(Spain) Antonio Varo Ramos (Spain) Karlos Rodriguez Vidal	
27/2/2025	(Netherlands) Menno Nolten (France) Philemon Raichman	6–3 / 4–6 / 6–3	(Spain) Pablo Pastor (Spain) Samuel Rivas García	
27/2/2025	(Argentina) Gonzalo Alfonso (Argentina) Leonel Aguirre	6–3 / 6–2	(Chile) Cristobal Martinez (Argentina) Pablo Molina	
27/2/2025	(Argentina) Julian Lacamoire (Egypt) Youssef Hossam	7–5 / 4–6 / 6–4	(Spain) Juan Zamora Perez (Paraguay) Mariano Gonzalez	
27/2/2025	(Paraguay) Facundo Dehnike (Spain) Manuel Aragon	6–4 / 6–4	(Spain) Boris Castro García (Italy) Enzo Jensen	
27/2/2025	(Spain) Diego García (Spain) Francisco Cabeza	6–2 / 6–3	(Netherlands) Bram Meijer (Netherlands) Sten Richters	
27/2/2025	(Italy) Lorenzo Di Giovanni (Italy) Simone Iacovino	7–6 / 6–3	(Portugal) Diogo Jesus (Spain) Sergio Arias	

Women's

Date	Winners	Score	Opponent	Refs.
27/2/2025	(Spain) Ariana Sánchez (Spain) Paula Josemaría	7–6 / 6–4	(Spain) Marina Guinart (Spain) Victoria Iglesias	
27/2/2025	(Spain) Alejandra Salazar (Spain) Verónica Virseda	6–3 / 5–7 / 6–0	(Italy) Giorgia Marchetti (Spain) Sara Ruiz	
27/2/2025	(Spain) Alejandra Alonso (Spain) Andrea Ustero	6–4 / 6–4	(Spain) Lucia Sainz (Spain) Patricia Llaguno	
27/2/2025	(Spain) Bea González (Spain) Claudia Fernández	6–2 / 6–4	(Spain) Beatriz Caldera (Spain) Carmen Goenaga	
27/2/2025	(Spain) Marta Ortega (Portugal) Sofia Araújo	6–2 / 3–6 / 6–1	(Italy) Carolina Orsi (Spain) Nuria Rodriguez	
27/2/2025	(Argentina) Aranzazu Osoro (Spain) Jessica Castelló	6–1 / 6–1	(Spain) Lara Arruabarrena (Spain) Lorena Rufo	
27/2/2025	(Argentina) Claudia Jensen (Spain) Tamara Icardo	6–0 / 6–0	(Portugal) Ana Catarina Nogueira (Argentina) Martina Fassio Goyeneche	
27/2/2025	(Argentina) Delfina Brea (Spain) Gemma Triay	6–4 / 6–2	ESP}} Coral Alvarez Castro (Spain) Cristina Gonzalez Cidoncha	

=== Quarter-Finals ===
Men's

Date	Winners	Score	Opponent	Refs.
28/2/2025	(Spain) Jaume Romera Barcelo (Italy) Simone Cremona	6–0 / 6–7 / 6–3	(Portugal) Joao Maria Caiano (Netherlands) Thijs Roper	
28/2/2025	(Argentina) Gonzalo Alfonso (Argentina) Leonel Aguirre	6–1 / 1–0 / W.O.	(Netherlands) Menno Nolten (France) Philemon Raichman	
28/2/2025	(Paraguay) Facundo Dehnike (Spain) Manuel Aragon	6–3 / 6–7 / 6–3	(Argentina) Julian Lacamoire (Egypt) Youssef Hossam	
28/2/2025	(Spain) Diego García (Spain) Francisco Cabeza	7–6 / 6–2	(Italy) Lorenzo Di Giovanni (Italy) Simone Iacovino	

Women's

Date	Winners	Score	Opponent	Refs.
28/2/2025	(Spain) Ariana Sánchez (Spain) Paula Josemaría	6–3 / 6–2	(Spain) Alejandra Salazar (Spain) Verónica Virseda	
28/2/2025	(Spain) Alejandra Alonso (Spain) Andrea Ustero	6–2 / 6–4	(Spain) Bea González (Spain) Claudia Fernández	
28/2/2025	(Spain) Marta Ortega (Portugal) Sofia Araújo	6–2 / 7–5	(Argentina) Aranzazu Osoro (Spain) Jessica Castelló	
28/2/2025	(Argentina) Delfina Brea (Spain) Gemma Triay	5–7 / 6–0 / 6–3	(Argentina) Claudia Jensen (Spain) Tamara Icardo	

=== Semi-Finals ===
Men's

Date	Winners	Score	Opponent	Refs.
1/3/2025	(Argentina) Gonzalo Alfonso (Argentina) Leonel Aguirre	6–4 / 7–6	(Spain) Jaume Romera Barcelo (Italy) Simone Cremona	
1/3/2025	(Spain) Diego García (Spain) Francisco Cabeza	6–4 / 6–4	(Paraguay) Facundo Dehnike (Spain) Manuel Aragon	

Women's

Date	Winners	Score	Opponent	Refs.
1/3/2025	(Spain) Ariana Sánchez (Spain) Paula Josemaría	6–1 / 6–4	(Spain) Alejandra Alonso (Spain) Andrea Ustero	
1/3/2025	(Argentina) Delfina Brea (Spain) Gemma Triay	6–1 / 6–3	(Spain) Marta Ortega (Portugal) Sofia Araújo	

=== Finals ===
Men's

Date	Winners	Score	Opponent	Refs.
2/3/2025	(Spain) Diego García (Spain) Francisco Cabeza	7–5 / 4–6 / 6–3	(Argentina) Gonzalo Alfonso (Argentina) Leonel Aguirre	

Women's

Date	Winners	Score	Opponent	Refs.
2/3/2025	(Argentina) Delfina Brea (Spain) Gemma Triay	0–6 / 6–1 / 6–4	(Spain) Ariana Sánchez (Spain) Paula Josemaría	
