= 2025 Paris Major =

Padel championships

- Date: 30 August – 7 September
- Edition: 4th
- Category: Major
- Prize money: €1.029.558
- Location: Paris, France
- Venue: Stade Roland Garros

Champions
- Men's doubles: (Argentina) Agustín Tapia (Spain) Arturo Coello
- Women's doubles: (Argentina) Delfina Brea (Spain) Gemma Triay

Chronology

The 2025 Paris Major (officially 2025 Premier Padel Alpine Paris Major) was the sixteenth tournament of the fourth season organized by Premier Padel, the premier padel circuit, promoted by the International Padel Federation, and with the financial backing of Nasser Al-Khelaïfi's Qatar Sports Investments.

In the women's category, the No. 5 pair, Marta Ortega & Tamara Icardo, reached their second final as a team, where they faced world number ones Delfina Brea & Gemma Triay. In the title match, the world's top-ranked pair gave their opponents no chance, securing their seventh title of the season.

In the men's category, the top two pairs in the FIP rankings faced each other in the finals for the seventh time in 2025. In the title match, Agustín Tapia & Arturo Coello gave Alejandro Galán & Federico Chingotto no chance, securing their ninth title of the season.

== Relevant Data ==
=== Record attendance ===
Around 25,000 spectators were present at Court Philippe Chatrier over the weekend alone to watch the semifinals and finals, a record for the French event.

=== The Dominance of Tapia and Coello ===
By winning the tournament, Agustín Tapia and Arturo Coello secured their third consecutive Paris Major victory, marking the pair ninth title of 2025. Furthermore, the world number ones further cemented their dominance over Alejandro Galán and Federico Chingotto, improving their head-to-head record to 16–6 (6–1 this season).

This superiority becomes even more evident when looking at recent matchups, with the world number 1s holding a record of 13 wins and just one loss against their main rivals since last season's Genoa P2 (July 2024).

=== Tapia ascends the throne ===
By winning the Paris Major, Agustín Tapia tied Alejandro Galán as the active player with the most titles, with both having won 49 tournaments over the course of their careers.

Thus, Tapia boasts a record that includes being a two-time world number one, a two-time world champion with Argentina, and the winner of 49 professional titles across the World Padel Tour and Premier Padel.

== Seeds ==
Male

Rnk.	Team	FIP Ranking Points
1	(Argentina) Agustín Tapia (Spain) Arturo Coello	39880
2	(Spain) Alejandro Galán (Argentina) Federico Chingotto	27380
3	(Argentina) Franco Stupaczuk (Spain) Juan Lebrón	16385
4	(Spain) Coki Nieto (Spain) Mike Yanguas	14307
5	(Brazil) Lucas Bergamini (Spain) Paquito Navarro	9765
6	(Spain) Jon Sanz (Spain) Momo Gonzalez	9655
7	(Argentina) Leandro Augsburguer (Argentina) Martin Di Nenno	8642
8	(Argentina) Juan Tello (Spain) Pablo Cardona	6547
9	(Spain) Eduardo Alonso (Spain) Jairo Bautista	6146
10	(Spain) Fran Guerrero (Spain) Javi Leal	5622
11	(Spain) Alejandro Arroyo (United Arab Emirates) Inigo Jofre	4330
12	(Spain) Javier Barahona (Spain) Javier Garcia Mora	4155
13	(Argentina) Alex Chozas (Argentina) Leonel Aguirre	4065
14	(Spain) Jose Garcia Diestro (Spain) Juanlu Esbri	4054
15	(Spain) Alejandro Ruiz (Spain) Victor Ruiz	3987
16	(Spain) Javier Garrido (Spain) Pablo Garcia Rodrigo	3819

Female

Rnk.	Team	FIP Ranking Points
1	(Argentina) Delfina Brea (Spain) Gemma Triay	31870
2	(Spain) Ariana Sánchez (Spain) Paula Josemaria	31260
3	(Spain) Bea González (Spain) Claudia Fernandéz	22950
4	(Spain) Andrea Ustero (Portugal) Sofia Araújo	13645
5	(Spain) Marta Ortega (Spain) Tamara Icardo	11810
6	(Spain) Alejandra Alonso (Argentina) Claudia Jensen	9555
7	(Argentina) Aranzazu Osoro (Spain) Veronica Virseda	8710
8	(Spain) Alejandra Salazar (Spain) Martina Calvo	7455
9	(Spain) Lucia Sainz (Spain) Patricia Llaguno	7005
10	(Spain) Jessica Castelló (Spain) Lorena Rufo	6245
11	(Spain) Beatriz Caldera (Spain) Carmen Goenaga	5939
12	(Spain) Marina Guinart (Spain) Victoria Iglesias	5890
13	(France) Alix Collombon (Spain) Araceli Martinez	4064
14	(Spain) Marta Barrera (Spain) Marta Caparrós	3798
15	(Russia) Ksenia Sharifova (Argentina) Virginia Riera	3739
16	(Spain) Lucia Martinez Gomez (Spain) Nuria Rodriguez	3565

== Head-to-head record between teams ranked in the top 4 during the season ==
=== Man's ===
Record	Coello–Tapia	Galán–Chingotto	Lebrón–Stupaczuk	Coki–Yanguas
Coello–Tapia	—	6–1	3–1	4–0
Galán–Chingotto	1–6	—	4–1	4–0
Lebrón–Stupaczuk	1–3	1–4	—	—
Coki–Yanguas	0–4	0–4	—	—

=== Women's ===
Record	D. Brea–Triay	Ariana–Paula	Gonzalez–Fernandez	Araújo–Ustero	Former Pairs	Araújo–Ortega
D. Brea–Triay	—	5–1	2–5	3–0		3–0
Ariana–Paula	1–5	—	7–1	2–0		1–1
Gonzalez–Fernandez	5–2	1–7	—	—		—
Araújo–Ustero	0–3	0–2	—	—		—
Former Pairs						
Araújo–Ortega	0–3	1–1	—	—		—

Because the Santiago final ended in a draw, it is not counted.

== Draws ==
=== Men's Bracket ===
Round of 32
1	(Spain) Coello / (Argentina) Tapia	7	6
22	(Spain) A. Goñi / (Argentina) L. Capra	4	4
24	(Spain) G. Collado / (Spain) P.H. Alvarez	6	6	6
13	(Argentina) A. Chozas / (Argentina) L. Aguirre	3	7	2
12	(Spain) J. Barahona / (Spain) J.G. Mora	3	7	6
18	(Spain) F. Gil / (Argentina) Maxi	6	6	4
31	(Italy) D. Perino / (Argentina) I. Piotto	6	6
6	(Spain) J. Sanz / (Spain) Momo	3	1
8	(Argentina) J. Tello / (Spain) P. Cardona	6	6
35	(Spain) I. Sager / (Spain) J. Rico	4	3
25	(Spain) F. Cabeza / (Spain) T. Zapata	4	6
10	(Spain) F. Guerrero / (Spain) J. Leal	6	7
16	(Spain) J. Garrido / (Spain) P.G. Rodrigo	5	6	6
21	(Italy) A. Patiniotis / (Spain) J. Moya	7	3	4
Q	(Italy) F. Abbate / (Spain) M. Salguero	1	1
3	(Spain) Lebrón / (Argentina) Stupaczuk	6	6
4	(Spain) Coki / (Spain) Yanguas	6	6
38	(Italy) F. Dominguez / (Spain) J. Martinez	4	3
27	(Spain) A.F. Lancha / (Spain) A. Cepero	7	6
14	(Spain) J.G. Diestro / (Spain) J. Esbri	6	1
15	(Spain) A. Ruiz / (Spain) V. Ruiz	3	4
23	(Spain) G. Rubio / (Spain) J. Ruiz	6	6
17	(Argentina) G. Alfonso / (Argentina) Sanyo	2	6	6
7	(Argentina) Di Nenno / (Argentina) L. Augsburger	6	3	4
5	(Brazil) L. Bergamini / (Spain) Paquito	6	6
41	(Spain) I. Vilariño / (Spain) S. Oria	7	7
29	(Spain) D. Garcia / (Spain) J.L. Gonzalez	2	4
9	(Spain) E. Alonso / (Spain) J. Bautista	6	6
11	(Spain) A. Arroyo / (United Arab Emirates) I. Jofre	6	7
19	(Spain) D. Sánchez / (Brazil) L. Campagnolo	4	6
20	(Portugal) M. Deus / (Portugal) N. Deus	3	5
2	(Argentina) Chingotto / (Spain) Galán	6	7

Round of 16
1	(Spain) Coello / (Argentina) Tapia	6	6
24	(Spain) G. Collado / (Spain) P.H. Alvarez	0	2
12	(Spain) J. Barahona / (Spain) J.G. Mora	6	7
31	(Italy) D. Perino / (Argentina) I. Piotto	3	6
8	(Argentina) J. Tello / (Spain) P. Cardona	3	3
10	(Spain) F. Guerrero / (Spain) J. Leal	6	6
16	(Spain) J. Garrido / (Spain) P.G. Rodrigo	4	1
3	(Spain) Lebrón / (Argentina) Stupaczuk	6	6
4	(Spain) Coki / (Spain) Yanguas	6	6
27	(Spain) A.F. Lancha / (Spain) A. Cepero	2	0
23	(Spain) G. Rubio / (Spain) J. Ruiz	6	1	7
17	(Argentina) G. Alfonso / (Argentina) Sanyo	2	6	6
41	(Spain) I. Vilariño / (Spain) S. Oria	2	3
9	(Spain) E. Alonso / (Spain) J. Bautista	6	6
11	(Spain) A. Arroyo / (United Arab Emirates) I. Jofre	1	0
2	(Argentina) Chingotto / (Spain) Galán	6	6

Quarter-Final
1	(Spain) Coello / (Argentina) Tapia	7	6
12	(Spain) J. Barahona / (Spain) J.G. Mora	5	1
10	(Spain) F. Guerrero / (Spain) J. Leal	1	1
3	(Spain) Lebrón / (Argentina) Stupaczuk	6	6
4	(Spain) Coki / (Spain) Yanguas	6	6
23	(Spain) G. Rubio / (Spain) J. Ruiz	0	4
9	(Spain) E. Alonso / (Spain) J. Bautista
2	(Argentina) Chingotto / (Spain) Galán	*

Semi-Finals
1	(Spain) Coello / (Argentina) Tapia	7	6
3	(Spain) Lebrón / (Argentina) Stupaczuk	5	2
4	(Spain) Coki / (Spain) Yanguas	0	2
2	(Argentina) Chingotto / (Spain) Galán	6	6

Finals
1	(Spain) Coello / (Argentina) Tapia	6	6
2	(Argentina) Chingotto / (Spain) Galán	1	4

=== Women's Bracket ===
Round of 32
1	(Argentina) D. Brea / (Spain) Triay
Bye
19	(Spain) M.R. Abajo / (Spain) N. Canovas	3	4
12	(Spain) M. Guinart / (Spain) V. Iglesias	6	6
15	(Russia) K. Sharifova / (Argentina) V. Riera	6	6
27	(Spain) J. Bautista / (Spain) N. Aguilar	4	4
23	(Spain) C. Mesa / (Spain) S. Ruiz	2	0
8	(Spain) A. Salazar / (Spain) M. Calvo	6	3	*
7	(Argentina) A. Osoro / (Spain) V. Virseda	6	6
33	(Sweden) C. Navarro / (Spain) M. Rivas	2	2
18	(Italy) C. Orsi / (Argentina) M. Goyeneche	6	7	6
10	(Spain) J. Castelló / (Spain) L. Rufo	7	5	1
13	(France) A. Collombon / (Spain) A. Martinez	6	6
Q	(Spain) A. Sanjuan / (Spain) A. Gracia	1	3
Bye
4	(Spain) A. Ustero / (Portugal) S. Araújo
3	(Spain) B. González / (Spain) C. Fernandéz
Bye
20	(Argentina) J. Bidahorria / (Spain) L. Arruabarrena	3	6	6
16	(Spain) L. Martinez / (Spain) N. Rodriguez	6	2	2
9	(Spain) L. Sainz / (Spain) P. Llaguno	7	6
25	(Spain) A. Perez / (Spain) M. Borrero	6	2
28	(Spain) L. Lujan / (Spain) L. Manquillo	1	0
5	(Spain) M. Ortega / (Spain) T. Icardo	6	6
6	(Spain) A. Alonso / (Argentina) C. Jensen	7	4	6
17	(Spain) J. Velasco / (Spain) R. Barrera	6	6	2
22	(Portugal) A. Nogueira / (Spain) M. Merino	5	0
11	(Spain) B. Caldera / (Spain) C. Goenaga	7	6
14	(Spain) M. Barrera / (Spain) M. Caparrós	6	6
30	(Spain) J. Cabruja / (Spain) P. Martinez	1	2
Bye
2	(Spain) A. Sánchez / (Spain) P. Josemaria

Round of 16
1	(Argentina) D. Brea / (Spain) Triay	6	6
12	(Spain) M. Guinart / (Spain) V. Iglesias	2	3
15	(Russia) K. Sharifova / (Argentina) V. Riera	4	6	6
8	(Spain) A. Salazar / (Spain) M. Calvo	6	1	4
7	(Argentina) A. Osoro / (Spain) V. Virseda	7	6
18	(Italy) C. Orsi / (Argentina) M. Goyeneche	6	1
13	(France) A. Collombon / (Spain) A. Martinez	3	2
4	(Spain) A. Ustero / (Portugal) S. Araújo	6	6
3	(Spain) B. González / (Spain) C. Fernandéz	6	6
20	(Argentina) J. Bidahorria / (Spain) L. Arruabarrena	1	2
9	(Spain) L. Sainz / (Spain) P. Llaguno	4	1
5	(Spain) M. Ortega / (Spain) T. Icardo	6	6
6	(Spain) A. Alonso / (Argentina) C. Jensen	2	2
11	(Spain) B. Caldera / (Spain) C. Goenaga	6	6
14	(Spain) M. Barrera / (Spain) M. Caparrós	3	0
2	(Spain) A. Sánchez / (Spain) P. Josemaria	6	6

Quarter-Final
1	(Argentina) D. Brea / (Spain) Triay	6	6
15	(Russia) K. Sharifova / (Argentina) V. Riera	1	1
7	(Argentina) A. Osoro / (Spain) V. Virseda	1	5
4	(Spain) A. Ustero / (Portugal) S. Araújo	6	7
3	(Spain) B. González / (Spain) C. Fernandéz	6	2
5	(Spain) M. Ortega / (Spain) T. Icardo	6	6
11	(Spain) B. Caldera / (Spain) C. Goenaga	2	4
2	(Spain) A. Sánchez / (Spain) P. Josemaria	6	6

Semi-Finals
1	(Argentina) D. Brea / (Spain) Triay	4	6	7
4	(Spain) A. Ustero / (Portugal) S. Araújo	6	2	5
5	(Spain) M. Ortega / (Spain) T. Icardo	7	6
2	(Spain) A. Sánchez / (Spain) P. Josemaria	6	4

Finals
1	(Argentina) D. Brea / (Spain) Triay	7	6
5	(Spain) M. Ortega / (Spain) T. Icardo	5	2

== Results ==
=== First Round ===
Men's

Date	Winners	Score	Opponent	Refs.
9/9/2025	(Spain) Aimar Goñi (Argentina) Lucho Capra	6–2 / 7–6	(Argentina) Agustín Gutiérrez (Chile) Javier Valdes	
9/9/2025	(Spain) Guillermo Collado (Spain) Pol Hernandez	6–1 / 6–4	(Argentina) Maximiliano Arce (Spain) Pablo Lijó	
9/9/2025	(Spain) Jose Jimenez Casas (Argentina) Maxi Sanchez Blasco	6–1 / 3–6 / 7–6	(Spain) Francisco Gil Morales (Argentina) Maxi Sánchez	
9/9/2025	(Italy) Denis Perino (Argentina) Ignacio Piotto	6–3 / 5–7 / 6–3	(Spain) Alonso Rodriguez (Argentina) Juan Ignacio Rubini	
9/9/2025	(Spain) Ignacio Sager (Spain) Javi Rico	6–3 / 3–6 / 6–4	(Spain) Mario Del Castillo (Argentina) Miguel Lamperti	
9/9/2025	(Spain) Francisco Cabeza (Spain) Teodoro Zapata	6–4 / 6–3	(Spain) Mario Huete Hernandez (Spain) Mario Ortega	
9/9/2025	(Italy) Aris Patiniotis (Spain) Jesus Moya	6–4 / 7–6	(Spain) Enrique Goenaga (Spain) Luis Hernandez Quesada	
9/9/2025	(Italy) Flavio Abbate (Spain) Manuel Castaño	6–3 / 7–6	(Spain) Daniel Santigosa (Spain) Emilio Sanchez Chamero	
9/9/2025	(Italy) Facundo Dominguez (Spain) Javier Martinez Vazquez	6–2 / 6–2	(Argentina) Eduardo Agustin Torre (Italy) Enzo Jensen	
9/9/2025	(Spain) Alvaro Cepero (Spain) Andres Fernandez Lancha	7–5 / 7–5	(Spain) Anton Sans (Spain) Marc Quilez	
9/9/2025	(Spain) Gonzalo Rubio (Spain) Javi Ruiz	6–3 / 6–4	(Spain) Adrian Marques (Italy) Marco Cassetta	
9/9/2025	(Argentina) Gonzalo Alfonso (Argentina) Sanyo Gutiérrez	6–1 / 6–4	(France) Bastien Blanque (France) Johan Bergeron	
9/9/2025	(Spain) Ignacio Vilariño (Spain) Salvador Oria	6–2 / 6–4	(France) Timeo Fonteny (France) Yoan Boronad	
9/9/2025	(Spain) Diego García (Spain) Jose Luis Gonzalez	6–4 / 6–4	(Spain) Alvaro Montiel (Argentina) Juan Cruz Belluati	
9/9/2025	(Spain) David Gala Sanchez (Brazil) Lucas Campagnolo	6–1 / 6–4	(France) Benjamin Tison (France) Maxime Forcin	
9/9/2025	(Portugal) Miguel Deus (Portugal) Nuno Deus	7–5 / 6–3	(Spain) Pincho Fernandez (Argentina) Ramiro Moyano	

Women's

Date	Winners	Score	Opponent	Refs.
9/9/2025	(Spain) Laia Rodriguez Abajo (Spain) Noa Canovas	6–4 / 6–2	(Spain) Anna Ortiz (Italy) Giulia Dal Pozzo	
9/9/2025	(Spain) Julia Polo Bautista (Spain) Noemi Aguilar	6–4 / 6–4	(France) Louise Bahurel (France) Lucile Pothier	
9/9/2025	(Spain) Carla Mesa (Spain) Sara Ruiz Soto	6–4 / 7–6	(Spain) Alba Perez Momha (Italy) Lorena Vano	
9/9/2025	(Sweden) Carolina Navarro Björk (Spain) Mónica Gomez Rivas	6–4 / 6–4	(Spain) Marta Talavan (Spain) Teresa Navarro	
9/9/2025	(Italy) Carolina Orsi (Argentina) Martina Fassio Goyeneche	7–5 / 6–3	(France) Carla Touly (Spain) Marta Arellano	
9/9/2025	(Spain) Aida Martinez San Juan (Spain) Ana Dominguez Gracia	7–5 / 1–6 / 6–4	(Spain) Barbara Las Heras (Italy) Giorgia Marchetti	
9/9/2025	(Argentina) Julieta Bidahorria (Spain) Lara Arruabarrena	6–1 / 4–6 / 6–1	(Spain) Lucía García Trella (Spain) Natividad Lopez Díaz	
9/9/2025	(Spain) Agueda Perez (Spain) Marta Borrero	6–3 / 7–6	(Spain) Camila Fassio Goyeneche (Spain) Lucía Peralta	
9/9/2025	(Spain) Laura Lujan Rodriguez (Spain) Letizia María Manquillo	6–1 / 4–6 / 6–2	(Spain) Ariadna Cañellas (Spain) Sandra Bellver	
9/9/2025	(Spain) Jimena Velasco (Spain) Raquel Eugenio Barrera	6–1 / 6–1	(Spain) Marina Martinez Lobo (Spain) Sofía Saiz Vallejo	
9/9/2025	(Portugal) Ana Catarina Nogueira (Spain) Melania Merino	6–1 / 6–0	(Italy) Chiara Pappacena (France) Jessica Ginier	
9/9/2025	(Spain) Esther Carnicero (France) Lea Godallier	7–6 / 1–6 / 6–3	(Spain) Jana Montes (Spain) Patricia Martinez Fortun	

=== Round of 32 ===
Men's

Date	Winners	Score	Opponent	Refs.
10/9/2025	(Argentina) Agustín Tapia (Spain) Arturo Coello	6–4 / 6–4	(Spain) Aimar Goñi (Argentina) Lucho Capra	
10/9/2025	(Spain) Guillermo Collado (Spain) Pol Hernandez	6–3 / 6–7 / 6–2	(Argentina) Alex Chozas (Argentina) Leonel Aguirre	
10/9/2025	(Spain) Javier Barahona (Spain) Javier García Mora	3–6 / 7–6 / 6–4	(Spain) Jose Jimenez Casas (Argentina) Maxi Sanchez Blasco	
10/9/2025	(Italy) Denis Perino (Argentina) Ignacio Piotto	6–3 / 6–1	(Spain) Jon Sanz (Spain) Momo Gonzalez	
10/9/2025	(Argentina) Juan Tello (Spain) Pablo Cardona	6–4 / 6–3	(Spain) Ignacio Sager (Spain) Javi Rico	
10/9/2025	(Spain) Francisco Guerrero (Spain) Javier Leal	6–4 / 7–6	(Spain) Francisco Cabeza (Spain) Teodoro Zapata	
10/9/2025	(Spain) Javi Garrido (Spain) Pablo García Rodrigo	5–7 / 6–3 / 6–4	(Italy) Aris Patiniotis (Spain) Jesus Moya	
10/9/2025	(Argentina) Franco Stupaczuk (Spain) Juan Lebrón	6–1 / 6–1	(Italy) Flavio Abbate (Spain) Manuel Castaño	
10/9/2025	(Spain) Coki Nieto (Spain) Mike Yanguas	6–4 / 6–3	(Italy) Facundo Dominguez (Spain) Javier Martinez Vazquez	
10/9/2025	(Spain) Alvaro Cepero (Spain) Andres Fernandez Lancha	7–6 / 6–1	(Spain) Jose García Diestro (Spain) Juanlu Esbri	
10/9/2025	(Spain) Gonzalo Rubio (Spain) Javi Ruiz	6–3 / 6–4	(Spain) Aléx Ruiz (Spain) Victor Ruiz	
10/9/2025	(Argentina) Gonzalo Alfonso (Argentina) Sanyo Gutiérrez	2–6 / 6–3 / 6–4	(Argentina) Leandro Augsburger (Argentina) Martin Di Nenno	
10/9/2025	(Spain) Ignacio Vilariño (Spain) Salvador Oria	7–6 / 7–6	(Brazil) Lucas Bergamini (Spain) Paquito Navarro	
10/9/2025	(Spain) Eduardo Alonso (Spain) Jairo Bautista	6–2 / 6–4	(Spain) Diego García (Spain) Jose Luis Gonzalez	
10/9/2025	(Spain) Alex Arroyo (United Arab Emirates) Iñigo Jofre	6–4 / 7–6	(Spain) David Gala Sanchez (Brazil) Lucas Campagnolo	
10/9/2025	(Spain) Alejandro Galán (Argentina) Federico Chingotto	6–3 / 7–5	(Portugal) Miguel Deus (Portugal) Nuno Deus	

Women's

Date	Winners	Score	Opponent	Refs.
10/9/2025	(Spain) Marina Guinart (Spain) Victoria Iglesias	6–3 / 6–4	(Spain) Laia Rodriguez Abajo (Spain) Noa Canovas	
10/9/2025	(Russia) Ksenia Sharifova (Argentina) Virginia Riera	6–4 / 6–4	(Spain) Julia Polo Bautista (Spain) Noemi Aguilar	
10/9/2025	(Spain) Alejandra Salazar (Spain) Martina Calvo	6–2 / 3–0 / W.O.	(Spain) Carla Mesa (Spain) Sara Ruiz Soto	
10/9/2025	(Argentina) Aranzazu Osoro (Spain) Verónica Virseda	6–2 / 6–2	(Sweden) Carolina Navarro Björk (Spain) Mónica Gomez Rivas	
10/9/2025	(Italy) Carolina Orsi (Argentina) Martina Fassio Goyeneche	6–7 / 7–5 / 6–1	(Spain) Jessica Castelló (Spain) Lorena Rufo	
10/9/2025	(France) Alix Collombon (Spain) Araceli Martinez	6–1 / 6–3	(Spain) Aida Martinez San Juan (Spain) Ana Dominguez Gracia	
10/9/2025	(Argentina) Julieta Bidahorria (Spain) Lara Arruabarrena	3–6 / 6–2 / 6–2	(Spain) Lucia Martinez Gomez (Spain) Nuria Rodriguez	
10/9/2025	(Spain) Lucia Sainz (Spain) Patricia Llaguno	7–6 / 6–2	(Spain) Agueda Perez (Spain) Marta Borrero	
10/9/2025	(Spain) Marta Ortega (Spain) Tamara Icardo	6–1 / 6–0	(Spain) Laura Lujan Rodriguez (Spain) Letizia María Manquillo	
10/9/2025	(Spain) Alejandra Alonso (Argentina) Claudia Jensen	7–6 / 4–6 / 6–2	(Spain) Jimena Velasco (Spain) Raquel Eugenio Barrera	
10/9/2025	(Spain) Beatriz Caldera (Spain) Carmen Goenaga	7–5 / 6–0	(Portugal) Ana Catarina Nogueira (Spain) Melania Merino	
10/9/2025	(Spain) Marta Barrera (Spain) Marta Caparrós	6–1 / 6–2	(Spain) Esther Carnicero (France) Lea Godallier	

=== Round of 16 ===
Men's

Date	Winners	Score	Opponent	Refs.
11/9/2025	(Argentina) Agustín Tapia (Spain) Arturo Coello	6–0 / 6–2	(Spain) Guillermo Collado (Spain) Pol Hernandez	
11/9/2025	(Spain) Javier Barahona (Spain) Javier García Mora	6–3 / 7–6	(Italy) Denis Perino (Argentina) Ignacio Piotto	
11/9/2025	(Spain) Francisco Guerrero (Spain) Javier Leal	6–3 / 6–3	(Argentina) Juan Tello (Spain) Pablo Cardona	
11/9/2025	(Argentina) Franco Stupaczuk (Spain) Juan Lebrón	6–4 / 6–1	(Spain) Javi Garrido (Spain) Pablo García Rodrigo	
11/9/2025	(Spain) Coki Nieto (Spain) Mike Yanguas	6–2 / 6–0	(Spain) Alvaro Cepero (Spain) Andres Fernandez Lancha	
11/9/2025	(Spain) Gonzalo Rubio (Spain) Javi Ruiz	6–2 / 1–6 / 7–6	(Argentina) Gonzalo Alfonso (Argentina) Sanyo Gutiérrez	
11/9/2025	(Spain) Eduardo Alonso (Spain) Jairo Bautista	6–2 / 6–3	(Spain) Ignacio Vilariño (Spain) Salvador Oria	
11/9/2025	(Spain) Alejandro Galán (Argentina) Federico Chingotto	6–1 / 6–0	(Spain) Alex Arroyo (United Arab Emirates) Iñigo Jofre	

Women's

Date	Winners	Score	Opponent	Refs.
11/9/2025	(Argentina) Delfina Brea (Spain) Gemma Triay	6–2 / 6–3	(Spain) Marina Guinart (Spain) Victoria Iglesias	
11/9/2025	(Russia) Ksenia Sharifova (Argentina) Virginia Riera	4–6 / 6–1 / 6–4	(Spain) Alejandra Salazar (Spain) Martina Calvo	
11/9/2025	(Argentina) Aranzazu Osoro (Spain) Verónica Virseda	7–6 / 6–1	(Italy) Carolina Orsi (Argentina) Martina Fassio Goyeneche	
11/9/2025	(Spain) Andrea Ustero (Portugal) Sofia Araújo	6–3 / 6–2	(France) Alix Collombon (Spain) Araceli Martinez	
11/9/2025	(Spain) Bea González (Spain) Claudia Fernández	6–1 / 6–2	(Argentina) Julieta Bidahorria (Spain) Lara Arruabarrena	
11/9/2025	(Spain) Marta Ortega (Spain) Tamara Icardo	6–4 / 6–1	(Spain) Lucia Sainz (Spain) Patricia Llaguno	
11/9/2025	(Spain) Beatriz Caldera (Spain) Carmen Goenaga	6–2 / 6–2	(Spain) Alejandra Alonso (Argentina) Claudia Jensen	
11/9/2025	(Spain) Ariana Sánchez (Spain) Paula Josemaría	6–3 / 6–0	(Spain) Marta Barrera (Spain) Marta Caparrós	

=== Quarter-Finals ===
Men's

Date	Winners	Score	Opponent	Refs.
12/9/2025	(Argentina) Agustín Tapia (Spain) Arturo Coello	7–5 / 6–1	(Spain) Javier Barahona (Spain) Javier García Mora	
12/9/2025	(Argentina) Franco Stupaczuk (Spain) Juan Lebrón	6–1 / 6–1	(Spain) Francisco Guerrero (Spain) Javier Leal	
12/9/2025	(Spain) Coki Nieto (Spain) Mike Yanguas	6–0 / 6–4	(Spain) Gonzalo Rubio (Spain) Javi Ruiz	
12/9/2025	(Spain) Alejandro Galán (Argentina) Federico Chingotto	W.O.	(Spain) Eduardo Alonso (Spain) Jairo Bautista	

Women's

Date	Winners	Score	Opponent	Refs.
12/9/2025	(Argentina) Delfina Brea (Spain) Gemma Triay	6–1 / 6–1	(Russia) Ksenia Sharifova (Argentina) Virginia Riera	
12/9/2025	(Spain) Andrea Ustero (Portugal) Sofia Araújo	6–1 / 7–5	(Argentina) Aranzazu Osoro (Spain) Verónica Virseda	
12/9/2025	(Spain) Marta Ortega (Spain) Tamara Icardo	7–6 / 6–2	(Spain) Bea González (Spain) Claudia Fernández	
12/9/2025	(Spain) Ariana Sánchez (Spain) Paula Josemaría	6–2 / 6–4	(Spain) Beatriz Caldera (Spain) Carmen Goenaga	

=== Semi-Finals ===
Men's

Date	Winners	Score	Opponent	Refs.
13/9/2025	(Argentina) Agustín Tapia (Spain) Arturo Coello	7–5 / 6–2	(Argentina) Franco Stupaczuk (Spain) Juan Lebrón	
13/9/2025	(Spain) Alejandro Galán (Argentina) Federico Chingotto	6–0 / 6–2	(Spain) Coki Nieto (Spain) Mike Yanguas	

Women's

Date	Winners	Score	Opponent	Refs.
13/9/2025	(Argentina) Delfina Brea (Spain) Gemma Triay	4–6 / 6–2 / 7–5	(Spain) Andrea Ustero (Portugal) Sofia Araújo	
13/9/2025	(Spain) Marta Ortega (Spain) Tamara Icardo	7–6 / 6–4	(Spain) Ariana Sánchez (Spain) Paula Josemaría	

=== Finals ===
Men's

Date	Winners	Score	Opponent	Refs.
14/9/2025	(Argentina) Agustín Tapia (Spain) Arturo Coello	6–1 / 6–4	(Spain) Alejandro Galán (Argentina) Federico Chingotto	

Women's

Date	Winners	Score	Opponent	Refs.
14/9/2025	(Argentina) Delfina Brea (Spain) Gemma Triay	7–5 / 6–2	(Spain) Marta Ortega (Spain) Tamara Icardo	
