= 2025 Germany P2 =

Padel championships

- Date: 20–28 September
- Edition: 1st
- Category: P2
- Prize money: €262.250
- Location: Düsseldorf, Germany
- Venue: Castello Düsseldorf

Champions
- Men's doubles: (Spain) Alejandro Galán (Argentina) Federico Chingotto
- Women's doubles: (Argentina) Delfina Brea (Spain) Gemma Triay

Chronology

The 2025 Germany P2 (officially 2025 Premier Padel Cupra Germany P2) was the seventeenth tournament of the fourth season organized by Premier Padel, the premier padel circuit, promoted by the International Padel Federation, and with the financial backing of Nasser Al-Khelaïfi's Qatar Sports Investments.

In the women's category, the top two pairs in the FIP rankings both reached the final for the eight time in 2025. In the title match, Delfina Brea & Gemma Triay defeated Ariana Sánchez & Paula Josemaría in three sets, claiming their eighth title of the season.

In the men's category, the top two pairs in the FIP rankings faced each other in a final for the eighth time in 2025. In the finals match, Alejandro Galán and Federico Chingotto managed to defeat Agustín Tapia and Arturo Coello for the second time in 2025, securing their fifth title of the season.

== Relevant Data ==
=== Another record for the number ones ===
With their quarterfinal victory, Agustín Tapia and Arturo Coello surpassed the 92% win rate of Fernando Belasteguín and Juan Martín Díaz, the most successful pair in padel history, by reaching the 93% mark. They also overtook the duo of Alejandro Galán and Juan Lebrón, who had secured 252 victories, by reaching 253 combining their wins across the World Padel Tour and Premier Padel circuits.

== Seeds ==
Male

Rnk.	Team	FIP Ranking Points
1	(Argentina) Agustín Tapia (Spain) Arturo Coello	37080
2	(Spain) Alejandro Galán (Argentina) Federico Chingotto	25340
3	(Argentina) Franco Stupaczuk (Spain) Juan Lebrón	16115
4	(Spain) Coki Nieto (Spain) Mike Yanguas	14516
5	(Argentina) Leandro Augsburguer (Argentina) Martin Di Nenno	9117
6	(Spain) Jon Sanz (Spain) Momo Gonzalez	8980
7	(Brazil) Lucas Bergamini (Spain) Paquito Navarro	8685
8	(Spain) Fran Guerrero (Spain) Javi Leal	6442
9	(Argentina) Juan Tello (Spain) Pablo Cardona	5969
10	(Spain) Javier Barahona (Spain) Javier Garcia Mora	4830
11	(Spain) Alejandro Arroyo (United Arab Emirates) Inigo Jofre	4382
12	(Spain) Alejandro Ruiz (Spain) Victor Ruiz	3906
13	(Argentina) Alex Chozas (Argentina) Leonel Aguirre	3800
14	(Argentina) Gonzalo Alfonso (Argentina) Sanyo Gutiérrez	3745
15	(Spain) Jose Garcia Diestro (Spain) Juanlu Esbri	3581
16	(Spain) Jairo Bautista (Spain) Santiago Pineda Cabello	3106

Female

Rnk.	Team	FIP Ranking Points
1	(Argentina) Delfina Brea (Spain) Gemma Triay	33490
2	(Spain) Ariana Sánchez (Spain) Paula Josemaria	26340
3	(Spain) Bea González (Spain) Claudia Fernandéz	23200
4	(Spain) Andrea Ustero (Portugal) Sofia Araújo	13355
5	(Spain) Marta Ortega (Spain) Tamara Icardo	12950
6	(Spain) Alejandra Alonso (Argentina) Claudia Jensen	9445
7	(Spain) Alejandra Salazar (Spain) Martina Calvo	7290
8	(Spain) Marina Guinart (Spain) Veronica Virseda	6955
9	(Argentina) Aranzazu Osoro (Spain) Victoria Iglesias	6205
10	(Spain) Beatriz Caldera (Spain) Carmen Goenaga	6204
11	(Spain) Lucia Sainz (Spain) Patricia Llaguno	6105
12	(Spain) Jessica Castelló (Spain) Lorena Rufo	5300
13	(France) Alix Collombon (Spain) Araceli Martinez	4200
14	(Spain) Marta Barrera (Spain) Marta Caparrós	4116
15	(Italy) Carolina Orsi (Argentina) Martina Fassio Goyeneche	3560
16	(Spain) Jimena Velasco (Spain) Raquel Eugenio Barrera	3519

== Head-to-head record between teams ranked in the top 4 during the season ==
=== Man's ===
Record	Coello–Tapia	Galán–Chingotto	Lebrón–Stupaczuk	Coki–Yanguas
Coello–Tapia	—	6–2	3–1	4–0
Galán–Chingotto	2–6	—	4–1	5–0
Lebrón–Stupaczuk	1–3	1–4	—	—
Coki–Yanguas	0–4	0–5	—	—

=== Women's ===
Record	D. Brea–Triay	Ariana–Paula	Gonzalez–Fernandez	Araújo–Ustero	Former Pairs	Araújo–Ortega
D. Brea–Triay	—	6–1	2–5	3–0		3–0
Ariana–Paula	1–6	—	7–1	3–0		1–1
Gonzalez–Fernandez	5–2	1–7	—	—		—
Araújo–Ustero	0–3	0–3	—	—		—
Former Pairs						
Araújo–Ortega	0–3	1–1	—	—		—

Because the Santiago final ended in a draw, it is not counted.

== Draws ==
=== Men's Bracket ===
Round of 32
1	(Spain) Coello / (Argentina) Tapia	6	6
15	(Spain) J.G. Diestro / (Spain) J. Esbri	1	2
10	(Spain) J. Barahona / (Spain) J.G. Mora	7	4	6
Q	(Italy) A. Caruso / (Argentina) J.C. Belluati	5	6	3
Q	(Argentina) F. Dal Bianco / (Argentina) V. Libaak	3	1
11	(Spain) A. Arroyo / (United Arab Emirates) I. Jofre	6	6
LL	(Spain) J. Bautista / (Spain) S. Cabello	1	2
8	(Spain) F. Guerrero / (Spain) J. Leal	6	6
6	(Spain) J. Sanz / (Spain) Momo	7	7
21	(Spain) G. Collado / (Spain) P.H. Alvarez	5	5
26	(Spain) E. Goenaga / (Spain) L.H. Quesada	1	6	3
12	(Spain) A. Ruiz / (Spain) V. Ruiz	6	4	6
WC	(Germany) J. Lindmeyer / (Germany) M. Wunner	0	2
22	(Spain) F. Cabeza / (Spain) T. Zapata	6	6
23	(Italy) F. Dominguez / (Spain) J.J. Casas	5	1
3	(Spain) Lebrón / (Argentina) Stupaczuk	7	6
4	(Spain) Coki / (Spain) Yanguas	6	7
24	(Spain) A.F. Lancha / (Spain) I. Sager	2	6
13	(Argentina) A. Chozas / (Argentina) L. Aguirre	3	6
17	(Spain) D. Sánchez / (Brazil) L. Campagnolo	6	7
9	(Argentina) J. Tello / (Spain) P. Cardona	6	6
20	(Spain) A. Cepero / (Argentina) E. Torre	3	4
Q	(Mexico) D. Garcia / (Spain) P. Ambel	1	2
7	(Brazil) L. Bergamini / (Spain) Paquito	6	6
5	(Argentina) Di Nenno / (Argentina) L. Augsburger	6	7
19	(Spain) F. Gil / (Argentina) Maxi	3	5
Q	(Argentina) M. Arce / (Spain) P. Lijó	6	7
25	(Italy) A. Patiniotis / (Spain) J. Moya	6	0
18	(Portugal) M. Deus / (Portugal) N. Deus	6	6
WC	(Germany) A. Reca / (Spain) G. Santiago	2	0
LL	(Spain) P.G. Rodrigo / (Spain) P. Fernandez	1	3
2	(Argentina) Chingotto / (Spain) Galán	6	6

Round of 16
1	(Spain) Coello / (Argentina) Tapia	6	6
10	(Spain) J. Barahona / (Spain) J.G. Mora	1	2
11	(Spain) A. Arroyo / (United Arab Emirates) I. Jofre	3	4
8	(Spain) F. Guerrero / (Spain) J. Leal	6	6
6	(Spain) J. Sanz / (Spain) Momo	6	6
12	(Spain) A. Ruiz / (Spain) V. Ruiz	3	3
22	(Spain) F. Cabeza / (Spain) T. Zapata	1	0
3	(Spain) Lebrón / (Argentina) Stupaczuk	6	6
4	(Spain) Coki / (Spain) Yanguas	6	6
17	(Spain) D. Sánchez / (Brazil) L. Campagnolo	1	1
9	(Argentina) J. Tello / (Spain) P. Cardona	4	3
7	(Brazil) L. Bergamini / (Spain) Paquito	6	6
5	(Argentina) Di Nenno / (Argentina) L. Augsburger	6	6
Q	(Argentina) M. Arce / (Spain) P. Lijó	4	4
18	(Portugal) M. Deus / (Portugal) N. Deus	0	2
2	(Argentina) Chingotto / (Spain) Galán	6	6

Quarter-Final
1	(Spain) Coello / (Argentina) Tapia	7	7
8	(Spain) F. Guerrero / (Spain) J. Leal	5	6
6	(Spain) J. Sanz / (Spain) Momo	7	6
3	(Spain) Lebrón / (Argentina) Stupaczuk	5	4
4	(Spain) Coki / (Spain) Yanguas	6	6
7	(Brazil) L. Bergamini / (Spain) Paquito	1	4
5	(Argentina) Di Nenno / (Argentina) L. Augsburger	1	4
2	(Argentina) Chingotto / (Spain) Galán	6	6

Semi-Finals
1	(Spain) Coello / (Argentina) Tapia	6	6
6	(Spain) J. Sanz / (Spain) Momo	1	3
4	(Spain) Coki / (Spain) Yanguas	1	2
2	(Argentina) Chingotto / (Spain) Galán	6	6

Finals
1	(Spain) Coello / (Argentina) Tapia	6	2
2	(Argentina) Chingotto / (Spain) Galán	7	6

=== Women's Bracket ===
Round of 32
1	(Argentina) D. Brea / (Spain) Triay
Bye
Q	(Spain) J. Bautista / (Spain) N. Aguilar	2
19	(Italy) G. Marchetti / (Spain) L. Martinez	4	*
15	(Italy) C. Orsi / (Argentina) M. Goyeneche	7	7
Q	(Spain) A. Moral / (Brazil) R. Piltcher	6	6
Bye
8	(Spain) M. Guinart / (Spain) V. Virseda
5	(Spain) M. Ortega / (Spain) T. Icardo
Bye
Q	(Spain) J. Cabruja / (Spain) P. Martinez	6	6	2
14	(Spain) M. Barrera / (Spain) M. Caparrós	1	7	6
17	(Argentina) J. Bidahorria / (Spain) L. Arruabarrena	4	5
10	(Spain) B. Caldera / (Spain) C. Goenaga	6	7
Bye
3	(Spain) B. González / (Spain) C. Fernandéz
4	(Spain) A. Ustero / (Portugal) S. Araújo
Bye
13	(France) A. Collombon / (Spain) A. Martinez	6	6
WC	(Hungary) D. Andrejszki / (Germany) V. Kurz	2	1
12	(Spain) J. Castelló / (Spain) L. Rufo	6	6	2
18	(Spain) M.R. Abajo / (Spain) N. Canovas	3	7	6
Bye
7	(Spain) A. Salazar / (Spain) M. Calvo
6	(Spain) A. Alonso / (Argentina) C. Jensen
Bye
16	(Spain) J. Velasco / (Spain) R. Barrera	3	6	7
11	(Spain) L. Sainz / (Spain) P. Llaguno	6	3	5
Q	(Spain) A. Perez / (Spain) M. Borrero	2	6
9	(Argentina) A. Osoro / (Spain) V. Iglesias	6	7
Bye
2	(Spain) A. Sánchez / (Spain) P. Josemaria

Round of 16
1	(Argentina) D. Brea / (Spain) Triay	6	6
19	(Italy) G. Marchetti / (Spain) L. Martinez	1	0
15	(Italy) C. Orsi / (Argentina) M. Goyeneche	3	4
8	(Spain) M. Guinart / (Spain) V. Virseda	6	6
5	(Spain) M. Ortega / (Spain) T. Icardo	6	6
14	(Spain) M. Barrera / (Spain) M. Caparrós	2	3
10	(Spain) B. Caldera / (Spain) C. Goenaga	2	2
3	(Spain) B. González / (Spain) C. Fernandéz	6	6
4	(Spain) A. Ustero / (Portugal) S. Araújo	6	6
13	(France) A. Collombon / (Spain) A. Martinez	3	1
18	(Spain) M.R. Abajo / (Spain) N. Canovas	0	2
7	(Spain) A. Salazar / (Spain) M. Calvo	6	6
6	(Spain) A. Alonso / (Argentina) C. Jensen	6	6
16	(Spain) J. Velasco / (Spain) R. Barrera	4	1
9	(Argentina) A. Osoro / (Spain) V. Iglesias	2	2
2	(Spain) A. Sánchez / (Spain) P. Josemaria	6	6

Quarter-Final
1	(Argentina) D. Brea / (Spain) Triay	6	6
8	(Spain) M. Guinart / (Spain) V. Virseda	2	1
5	(Spain) M. Ortega / (Spain) T. Icardo	3	6	6
3	(Spain) B. González / (Spain) C. Fernandéz	6	4	4
4	(Spain) A. Ustero / (Portugal) S. Araújo	7	3	7
7	(Spain) A. Salazar / (Spain) M. Calvo	5	6	6
6	(Spain) A. Alonso / (Argentina) C. Jensen	0	6	1
2	(Spain) A. Sánchez / (Spain) P. Josemaria	6	4	6

Semi-Finals
1	(Argentina) D. Brea / (Spain) Triay	6	7
5	(Spain) M. Ortega / (Spain) T. Icardo	4	5
4	' (Spain) A. Ustero / (Portugal) S. Araújo	5	4
2	(Spain) A. Sánchez / (Spain) P. Josemaria	7	6

Finals
1	(Argentina) D. Brea / (Spain) Triay	6	4	6
2	(Spain) A. Sánchez / (Spain) P. Josemaria	4	6	3

== Results ==
=== Round of 32 ===
Men's

Date	Winners	Score	Opponent	Refs.
23/9/2025	(Argentina) Agustín Tapia (Spain) Arturo Coello	6–1 / 6–2	(Spain) Jose García Diestro (Spain) Juanlu Esbri	
23/9/2025	(Spain) Javier Barahona (Spain) Javier García Mora	7–5 / 4–6 / 6–3	(Spain) Alvaro Montiel (Argentina) Juan Cruz Belluati	
23/9/2025	(Spain) Alex Arroyo (United Arab Emirates) Iñigo Jofre	6–3 / 6–1	(Argentina) Franco Dal Bianco (Argentina) Valentino Libaak	
23/9/2025	(Spain) Francisco Guerrero (Spain) Javier Leal	6–1 / 6–2	(Spain) Jairo Bautista (Spain) Santiago Pineda	
23/9/2025	(Spain) Jon Sanz (Spain) Momo Gonzalez	7–5 / 7–5	(Spain) Guillermo Collado (Spain) Pol Hernandez	
23/9/2025	(Spain) Aléx Ruiz (Spain) Victor Ruiz	6–1 / 4–6 / 6–3	(Spain) Enrique Goenaga (Spain) Luis Hernandez Quesada	
23/9/2025	(Spain) Francisco Cabeza (Spain) Teodoro Zapata	6–0 / 6–2	(Germany) Johannes Lindmeyer (Germany) Matthias Wunner	
23/9/2025	(Argentina) Franco Stupaczuk (Spain) Juan Lebrón	7–5 / 6–1	(Italy) Facundo Dominguez (Spain) Jose Jimenez Casas	
22/9/2025	(Spain) Coki Nieto (Spain) Mike Yanguas	6–2 / 7–6	(Spain) Alvaro Cepero (Spain) Andres Fernandez Lancha	
22/9/2025	(Spain) David Gala Sanchez (Brazil) Lucas Campagnolo	6–3 / 7–6	(Argentina) Alex Chozas (Argentina) Leonel Aguirre	
22/9/2025	(Argentina) Juan Tello (Spain) Pablo Cardona	6–3 / 6–4	(Spain) Alvaro Cepero (Spain) Eduardo Agustin Torre	
23/9/2025	(Brazil) Lucas Bergamini (Spain) Paquito Navarro	6–1 / 6–2	(Mexico) Diego Arredondo (Spain) Pablo Reina	
22/9/2025	(Argentina) Leandro Augsburger (Argentina) Martin Di Nenno	6–3 / 7–5	(Spain) Francisco Gil Morales (Argentina) Maxi Sánchez	
23/9/2025	(Argentina) Maximiliano Arce (Spain) Pablo Lijó	7–6 / 6–0	(Italy) Aris Patiniotis (Spain) Jesus Moya	
22/9/2025	(Portugal) Miguel Deus (Portugal) Nuno Deus	6–2 / 6–0	(Germany) Agustin Reca (Spain) Guillem Figuerola	
22/9/2025	(Spain) Alejandro Galán (Argentina) Federico Chingotto	6–1 / 6–3	(Spain) Pablo García Rodrigo (Spain) Pincho Fernandez	

Women's

Date	Winners	Score	Opponent	Refs.
23/9/2025	(Italy) Giorgia Marchetti (Spain) Lucia Martinez Gomez	4–2 / W.O.	(Spain) Julia Polo Bautista (Spain) Noemi Aguilar	
23/9/2025	(Italy) Carolina Orsi (Argentina) Martina Fassio Goyeneche	7–6 / 7–6	(Spain) Amanda Lopez Moral (Brazil) Raquel Piltcher	
23/9/2025	(Spain) Marta Barrera (Spain) Marta Caparrós	1–6 / 7–6 / 6–1	(Spain) Jana Montes (Spain) Patricia Martinez Fortun	
22/9/2025	(Spain) Beatriz Caldera (Spain) Carmen Goenaga	6–4 / 7–5	(Argentina) Julieta Bidahorria (Spain) Lara Arruabarrena	
22/9/2025	(France) Alix Collombon (Spain) Araceli Martinez	6–2 / 6–1	(Hungary) Dora Andrejszki (Germany) Victoria Kurz	
22/9/2025	(Spain) Laia Rodriguez Abajo (Spain) Noa Canovas	3–6 / 7–6 / 6–2	(Spain) Jessica Castelló (Spain) Lorena Rufo	
22/9/2025	(Spain) Jimena Velasco (Spain) Raquel Eugenio Barrera	3–6 / 6–3 / 7–5	(Spain) Lucia Sainz (Spain) Patricia Llaguno	
23/9/2025	(Argentina) Aranzazu Osoro (Spain) Victoria Iglesias	6–2 / 7–6	(Spain) Agueda Perez (Spain) Marta Borrero	

=== Round of 16 ===
Men's

Date	Winners	Score	Opponent	Refs.
25/9/2025	(Argentina) Agustín Tapia (Spain) Arturo Coello	6–1 / 6–2	(Spain) Javier Barahona (Spain) Javier García Mora	
25/9/2025	(Spain) Francisco Guerrero (Spain) Javier Leal	6–3 / 6–4	(Spain) Alex Arroyo (United Arab Emirates) Iñigo Jofre	
25/9/2025	(Spain) Jon Sanz (Spain) Momo Gonzalez	6–3 / 6–3	(Spain) Aléx Ruiz (Spain) Victor Ruiz	
25/9/2025	(Argentina) Franco Stupaczuk (Spain) Juan Lebrón	6–1 / 6–0	(Spain) Francisco Cabeza (Spain) Teodoro Zapata	
24/9/2025	(Spain) Coki Nieto (Spain) Mike Yanguas	6–1 / 6–1	(Spain) David Gala Sanchez (Brazil) Lucas Campagnolo	
24/9/2025	(Brazil) Lucas Bergamini (Spain) Paquito Navarro	6–4 / 6–3	(Argentina) Juan Tello (Spain) Pablo Cardona	
24/9/2025	(Argentina) Leandro Augsburger (Argentina) Martin Di Nenno	6–4 / 6–4	(Argentina) Maximiliano Arce (Spain) Pablo Lijó	
24/9/2025	(Spain) Alejandro Galán (Argentina) Federico Chingotto	6–0 / 6–2	(Portugal) Miguel Deus (Portugal) Nuno Deus	

Women's

Date	Winners	Score	Opponent	Refs.
25/9/2025	(Argentina) Delfina Brea (Spain) Gemma Triay	6–1 / 6–0	(Italy) Giorgia Marchetti (Spain) Lucia Martinez Gomez	
25/9/2025	(Spain) Marina Guinart (Spain) Verónica Virseda	6–3 / 6–4	(Italy) Carolina Orsi (Argentina) Martina Fassio Goyeneche	
24/9/2025	(Spain) Marta Ortega (Spain) Tamara Icardo	6–2 / 6–3	(Spain) Marta Barrera (Spain) Marta Caparrós	
24/9/2025	(Spain) Bea González (Spain) Claudia Fernández	6–2 / 6–2	(Spain) Beatriz Caldera (Spain) Carmen Goenaga	
24/9/2025	(Spain) Andrea Ustero (Portugal) Sofia Araújo	6–3 / 6–1	(France) Alix Collombon (Spain) Araceli Martinez	
25/9/2025	(Spain) Alejandra Salazar (Spain) Martina Calvo	6–0 / 6–2	(Spain) Laia Rodriguez Abajo (Spain) Noa Canovas	
25/9/2025	(Spain) Alejandra Alonso (Argentina) Claudia Jensen	6–4 / 6–1	(Spain) Jimena Velasco (Spain) Raquel Eugenio Barrera	
24/9/2025	(Spain) Ariana Sánchez (Spain) Paula Josemaría	6–2 / 6–2	(Argentina) Aranzazu Osoro (Spain) Victoria Iglesias	

=== Quarter-Finals ===
Men's

Date	Winners	Score	Opponent	Refs.
26/9/2025	(Argentina) Agustín Tapia (Spain) Arturo Coello	7–5 / 7–6	(Spain) Francisco Guerrero (Spain) Javier Leal	
26/9/2025	(Spain) Jon Sanz (Spain) Momo Gonzalez	7–5 / 6–4	(Argentina) Franco Stupaczuk (Spain) Juan Lebrón	
26/9/2025	(Spain) Coki Nieto (Spain) Mike Yanguas	6–1 / 6–4	(Brazil) Lucas Bergamini (Spain) Paquito Navarro	
26/9/2025	(Spain) Alejandro Galán (Argentina) Federico Chingotto	6–1 / 6–4	(Argentina) Leandro Augsburger (Argentina) Martin Di Nenno	

Women's

Date	Winners	Score	Opponent	Refs.
26/9/2025	(Argentina) Delfina Brea (Spain) Gemma Triay	6–2 / 6–1	(Spain) Marina Guinart (Spain) Verónica Virseda	
26/9/2025	(Spain) Marta Ortega (Spain) Tamara Icardo	3–6 / 6–4 / 6–4	(Spain) Bea González (Spain) Claudia Fernández	
26/9/2025	(Spain) Andrea Ustero (Portugal) Sofia Araújo	7–5 / 3–6 / 7–6	(Spain) Alejandra Salazar (Spain) Martina Calvo	
26/9/2025	(Spain) Ariana Sánchez (Spain) Paula Josemaría	6–0 / 4–6 / 6–1	(Spain) Alejandra Alonso (Argentina) Claudia Jensen	

=== Semi-Finals ===
Men's

Date	Winners	Score	Opponent	Refs.
27/9/2025	(Argentina) Agustín Tapia (Spain) Arturo Coello	6–1 / 6–3	(Spain) Jon Sanz (Spain) Momo Gonzalez	
27/9/2025	(Spain) Alejandro Galán (Argentina) Federico Chingotto	6–1 / 6–2	(Spain) Coki Nieto (Spain) Mike Yanguas	

Women's

Date	Winners	Score	Opponent	Refs.
27/9/2025	(Argentina) Delfina Brea (Spain) Gemma Triay	6–4 / 7–5	(Spain) Marta Ortega (Spain) Tamara Icardo	
27/9/2025	(Spain) Ariana Sánchez (Spain) Paula Josemaría	7–5 / 6–4	(Spain) Andrea Ustero (Portugal) Sofia Araújo	

=== Finals ===
Men's

Date	Winners	Score	Opponent	Refs.
28/9/2025	(Spain) Alejandro Galán (Argentina) Federico Chingotto	7–6 / 6–2	(Argentina) Agustín Tapia (Spain) Arturo Coello	

Women's

Date	Winners	Score	Opponent	Refs.
28/9/2025	(Argentina) Delfina Brea (Spain) Gemma Triay	6–4 / 4–6 / 6–3	(Spain) Ariana Sánchez (Spain) Paula Josemaría	
