= 2025 Málaga P1 =

Padel championships

- Date: 13 July – 20 July
- Edition: 2nd
- Category: P1
- Prize money: €474.500
- Location: Málaga, Spain
- Venue: Palacio de Deportes José María Martín Carpena

Champions
- Men's doubles: (Argentina) Agustín Tapia (Spain) Arturo Coello
- Women's doubles: (Spain) Bea González (Spain) Claudia Fernández

Chronology

The 2025 Málaga P1 (officially 2025 Premier Padel Málaga P1) was the thirteenth tournament of the fourth season organized by Premier Padel, the premier padel circuit, promoted by the International Padel Federation, and with the financial backing of Nasser Al-Khelaïfi's Qatar Sports Investments.

In the women's category, for the second consecutive tournament, neither of the top two pairs in the FIP rankings reached the final. In the title match, the world number 3 pair, Bea González and Claudia Fernández, defeated Marta Ortega and Tamara Icardo, claiming their second title of the season.

In the men's category, the two top-ranked pairs faced each other in the final for the second consecutive tournament. In the decisive match, Agustín Tapia and Arturo Coello defeated Alejandro Galán and Federico Chingotto in straight sets, claiming their seventh title of the season.

== Relevant Data ==
=== Salazar debuts with new partner ===
For this tournament, former world number one Alejandra Salazar, who had been coming off a poor run of results, teamed up with Martina Calvo. Martina had previously distinguished herself playing alongside Aranza Osoro, and together they competed in five tournaments, reaching two semifinals (Buenos Aires and Valladolid), two quarterfinals (Asunción and Bordeaux), and the Round of 16 at the Rome Major.

=== Lebrón misses another tournament ===
After not competing in the Bordeaux, due to lower back discomfort and medical advice, Juan Lebrón also missed the Málaga P1. With his partner absent, Franco Stupaczuk played the Málaga tournament alongside Maxi Arce.

The third-ranked pair had already missed the Qatar Major, one of the four events with more ranking points on the circuit, due to an injury sustained by Stupaczuk, which also led Lebrón to compete in the Brussels P2 alongside Álex Ruiz.

=== Unprecedented climbing in the rankings ===
By reaching the quarterfinals on his Premier Padel debut, alongside Franco Stupaczuk, Maxi Arce achieved the biggest rise in the history of padel, climbing from 1,182nd to 200th place in the world rankings. Arce arrived in Málaga with just 6 points and added another 180, jumping from 1,182nd to 200th, an unprecedented rise of 982 places in a single week.

=== Tapia's perfect record in Málaga ===
With his tournament win, alongside Arturo Coello, Agustín Tapia won his fifth consecutive title in tournaments held in Málaga, doing it with absolute dominance by not dropping a single set across those five finals.

Tapia's last 5 finals in Málaga:

- Tapia–Lima vs. Di Nenno–Paquito: 6–2, 7–6 (2021 - WPT)
- Tapia–Sanyo vs. Lima–Stupaczuk: 7–6, 6–4 (2022 - WPT)
- Coello–Tapia vs. Á. Ruiz–Tello: 7–6, 7–6 (2023 - WPT)
- Coello–Tapia vs. Chingotto–Galán: 6–2, 6–3 (2024 - PP)
- Coello–Tapia vs. Chingotto–Galán: 6–4, 7–5 (2025 - PP)

== Seeds ==
Male

Rnk.	Team	FIP Ranking Points
1	(Argentina) Agustín Tapia (Spain) Arturo Coello	37880
2	(Spain) Alejandro Galán (Argentina) Federico Chingotto	26180
3	(Spain) Coki Nieto (Spain) Mike Yanguas	13527
4	(Spain) Jon Sanz (Spain) Momo Gonzalez	10430
5	(Brazil) Lucas Bergamini (Spain) Paquito Navarro	9630
6	(Argentina) Juan Tello (Argentina) Martin Di Nenno	8727
7	(Argentina) Franco Stupaczuk (Argentina) Maximiliano Arce	8621
8	(Argentina) Leandro Augsburguer (Spain) Pablo Cardona	6797
9	(Spain) Eduardo Alonso (Spain) Jairo Bautista	6425
10	(Spain) Francisco Guerrero (Spain) Javi Leal	5397
11	(Spain) Javier Garrido (Argentina) Sanyo Gutiérrez	4952
12	(Spain) Alejandro Arroyo (United Arab Emirates) Inigo Jofre	4417
13	(Spain) Javier Barahona (Spain) Javier Garcia Mora	4155
14	(Spain) Alejandro Ruiz (Argentina) Victor Ruiz	3831
15	(Spain) Jose Garcia Diestro (Spain) Juanlu Esbri	3747
16	(Spain) Jose Garcia Diestro (Spain) Juanlu Esbri	3620

Female

Rnk.	Team	FIP Ranking Points
1	(Spain) Ariana Sánchez (Spain) Paula Josemaria	32700
2	(Argentina) Delfina Brea (Spain) Gemma Triay	30650
3	(Spain) Bea González (Spain) Claudia Fernandéz	21280
4	(Spain) Andrea Ustero (Portugal) Sofia Araújo	13300
5	(Spain) Marta Ortega (Spain) Tamara Icardo	10730
6	(Argentina) Aranzazu Osoro (Spain) Veronica Virseda	9060
7	(Spain) Alejandra Alonso (Argentina) Claudia Jensen	8970
8	(Spain) Lucia Sainz (Spain) Patricia Llaguno	7630
9	(Spain) Alejandra Salazar (Spain) Martina Calvo	6787
10	(Spain) Beatriz Caldera (Spain) Carmen Goenaga	6074
11	(Spain) Jessica Castelló (Spain) Lorena Rufo	5765
12	(Spain) Marina Guinart (Spain) Victoria Iglesias	5349
13	(France) Alix Collombon (Spain) Araceli Martinez	3983
14	(Italy) Carolina Orsi (Spain) Nuria Rodriguez	3701
15	(Spain) Marta Barrera (Spain) Marta Caparrós	3630
16	(Argentina) Lucia Martinez Gomez (Spain) Marta Marrero	3600

== Head-to-head record between teams ranked in the top 4 during the season ==
=== Man's ===
Record	Coello–Tapia	Galán–Chingotto	Lebrón–Stupaczuk	Coki–Yanguas
Coello–Tapia	—	4–1	2–1	2–0
Galán–Chingotto	1–4	—	3–1	3–0
Lebrón–Stupaczuk	1–2	1–3	—	—
Coki–Yanguas	0–2	0–3	—	—

=== Women's ===
Record	Ariana–Paula	D. Brea–Triay	Gonzalez–Fernandez	Araújo–Ustero	Former Pairs	Araújo–Ortega
Ariana–Paula	—	1–4	7–1	1–0		1–1
D. Brea–Triay	4–1	—	1–4	1–0		3–0
Gonzalez–Fernandez	1–7	4–1	—	—		—
Araújo–Ustero	0–1	0–1	—	—		—
Former Pairs						
Araújo–Ortega	1–1	0–3	—	—		—

Because the Santiago final ended in a draw, it is not counted.

== Draws ==
=== Men's Bracket ===
Round of 32
1	(Spain) Coello / (Argentina) Tapia	6	6
23	(Spain) G. Rubio / (Spain) J. Ruiz	2	4
28	(Spain) P.G. Rodrigo / (Spain) P. Fernandez	6	2	6
9	(Spain) E. Alonso / (Spain) J. Bautista	2	6	3
14	(Spain) Á. Ruiz / (Spain) V. Ruiz	4	7	6
31	(Spain) D. Bautista / (Spain) I. Sager	6	6	1
25	(Spain) E. Goenaga / (Spain) L.H. Quesada	2	6	4
6	(Argentina) J. Tello / (Argentina) Di Nenno	6	1	6
5	(Brazil) L. Bergamini / (Spain) Paquito	6	6
Q	(Italy) A. Caruso / (Italy) F. Abbate	3	1
21	(Spain) A. Cepero / (Argentina) A. Torre	7	6
11	(Spain) J. Garrido / (Argentina) Sanyo	6	3
15	(Argentina) A. Chozas / (Argentina) L. Aguirre	6	7
35	(Argentina) A. Gutiérrez / (Chile) J. Valdes	3	6
19	(Portugal) M. Deus / (Portugal) N. Deus	3	*
4	(Spain) J. Sanz / (Spain) Momo	0
3	(Spain) Coki / (Spain) Yanguas	6	6
20	(Spain) D. Sánchez / (Brazil) L. Campagnolo	4	3
Q	(Spain) A. Goñi / (Spain) M. Ortega	2	6
10	(Spain) F. Guerrero / (Spain) J. Leal	6	7
16	(Spain) J.G. Diestro / (Spain) J. Esbri	6	6
Q	(Spain) A.R. Martinez / (Argentina) J. Rubini	0	3
Q	(Spain) M. Del Castillo / (Argentina) M. Lamperti	3	4
8	(Argentina) L. Augsburger / (Spain) P. Cardona	6	6
7	(Argentina) M. Arce / (Argentina) Stupaczuk	6	6
29	(Spain) D. Sastre / (Spain) E. Chamero	2	3
17	(Spain) F. Gil / (Argentina) Maxi	6	3	2
13	(Spain) J. Barahona / (Spain) J.G. Mora	4	6	6
12	(Spain) A. Arroyo / (United Arab Emirates) I. Jofre	6	7
Q	(Argentina) C.G. Gutiérrez / (Argentina) F. Lopez	3	6
27	(Spain) G. Losada / (Spain) P.H. Alvarez	2	0
2	(Spain) Galán / (Argentina) Chingotto	6	6

Round of 16
1	(Spain) Coello / (Argentina) Tapia	6	6
28	(Spain) P.G. Rodrigo / (Spain) P. Fernandez	0	2
14	(Spain) Á. Ruiz / (Spain) V. Ruiz	2	6
6	(Argentina) J. Tello / (Argentina) Di Nenno	6	7
5	(Brazil) L. Bergamini / (Spain) Paquito	6	6
21	(Spain) A. Cepero / (Argentina) A. Torre	2	2
15	(Argentina) A. Chozas / (Argentina) L. Aguirre	3	7	6
19	(Portugal) M. Deus / (Portugal) N. Deus	6	6	4
3	(Spain) Coki / (Spain) Yanguas	6	6
10	(Spain) F. Guerrero / (Spain) J. Leal	2	4
16	(Spain) J.G. Diestro / (Spain) J. Esbri	4	6
8	(Argentina) L. Augsburger / (Spain) P. Cardona	6	7
7	(Argentina) M. Arce / (Argentina) Stupaczuk	6	6
13	(Spain) J. Barahona / (Spain) J.G. Mora	1	1
12	(Spain) A. Arroyo / (United Arab Emirates) I. Jofre
2	(Spain) Galán / (Argentina) Chingotto	*

Quarter-Final
1	(Spain) Coello / (Argentina) Tapia	6	6
6	(Argentina) J. Tello / (Argentina) Di Nenno	4	3
5	(Brazil) L. Bergamini / (Spain) Paquito	6	6
15	(Argentina) A. Chozas / (Argentina) L. Aguirre	0	2
3	(Spain) Coki / (Spain) Yanguas	6	6
8	(Argentina) L. Augsburger / (Spain) P. Cardona	4	3
7	(Argentina) M. Arce / (Argentina) Stupaczuk	5	4
2	(Spain) Galán / (Argentina) Chingotto	7	6

Semi-Finals
1	(Spain) Coello / (Argentina) Tapia	6	6
5	(Brazil) L. Bergamini / (Spain) Paquito	4	0
3	(Spain) Coki / (Spain) Yanguas	6	4	6
2	(Spain) Galán / (Argentina) Chingotto	1	6	7

Finals
1	(Spain) Coello / (Argentina) Tapia	6	7
2	(Spain) Galán / (Argentina) Chingotto	4	5

=== Women's Bracket ===
Round of 32
1	(Spain) A. Sánchez / (Spain) P. Josemaria
Bye
21	(Spain) M. Talavan / (Spain) T. Navarro	6	6
23	(Spain) B. Las Heras / (Italy) G. Marchetti	1	1
20	(Argentina) J. Bidahorria / (Spain) L. Arruabarrena	7	6
10	(Spain) B. Caldera / (Spain) C. Goenaga	5	4
14	(Italy) C. Orsi / (Spain) N. Rodriguez	4	2
5	(Spain) M. Ortega	6	6
7	(Spain) A. Alonso / (Argentina) C. Jensen	5
19	(Russia) K. Sharifova / (Spain) M.R. Abajo	2
12	(Spain) M. Guinart / (Spain) V. Iglesias	7	4	6
Q	(Spain) A. Perez / (Spain) M. Borrero	6	6	1
11	(Spain) J. Castelló / (Spain) L. Rufo	5	2
Q	(Spain) C. Mesa / (Spain) S. Ruiz	7	6
Bye
4	(Spain) A. Ustero / (Portugal) S. Araújo
3	(Spain) B. González / (Spain) C. Fernandéz
Bye
17	(Spain) R. Barrera / (Argentina) V. Riera	3	6	6
15	(Spain) M. Barrera / (Spain) M. Caparrós	6	3	2
WC	(Sweden) C. Navarro / (Spain) M. Merino	6	1	6
13	(France) A. Collombon / (Spain) A. Martinez	4	6	3
22	(Portugal) A. Nogueira / (Argentina) M. Goyeneche	6	0	6
6	(Argentina) A. Osoro / (Spain) V. Virseda	4	6	4
8	(Spain) L. Sainz / (Spain) P. Llaguno	6	6
Q	(Spain) J. Cabruja / (Spain) M. Arellano	1	2
16	(Spain) L. Martinez / (Spain) M. Marrero	7	4	3
9	(Spain) A. Salazar / (Spain) M. Calvo	6	6	6
Q	(Spain) M. Lobo / (Spain) S. Saiz	6	6
18	(Spain) J. Velasco / (Spain) N. Canovas	2	4
Bye
2	(Argentina) D. Brea / (Spain) Triay

Round of 16
1	(Spain) A. Sánchez / (Spain) P. Josemaria	6	6
21	(Spain) M. Talavan / (Spain) T. Navarro	3	2
20	(Argentina) J. Bidahorria / (Spain) L. Arruabarrena	0	2
5	(Spain) M. Ortega / (Spain) T. Icardo	6	6
7	(Spain) A. Alonso / (Argentina) C. Jensen	6	6
12	(Spain) M. Guinart / (Spain) V. Iglesias	3	1
Q	(Spain) C. Mesa / (Spain) S. Ruiz	2	7	4
4	(Spain) A. Ustero / (Portugal) S. Araújo	6	6	6
3	(Spain) B. González / (Spain) C. Fernandéz	6	6
17	(Spain) R. Barrera / (Argentina) V. Riera	1	3
WC	(Sweden) C. Navarro / (Spain) M. Merino	5	4
22	(Portugal) A. Nogueira / (Argentina) M. Goyeneche	7	6
8	(Spain) L. Sainz / (Spain) P. Llaguno	5	1
9	(Spain) A. Salazar / (Spain) M. Calvo	7	6
Q	(Spain) M. Lobo / (Spain) S. Saiz	2	1
2	(Argentina) D. Brea / (Spain) Triay	6	6

Quarter-Final
1	(Spain) A. Sánchez / (Spain) P. Josemaria	6	3	2
5	(Spain) M. Ortega / (Spain) T. Icardo	4	6	6
7	(Spain) A. Alonso / (Argentina) C. Jensen	6	6
4	(Spain) A. Ustero / (Portugal) S. Araújo	1	3
3	(Spain) B. González / (Spain) C. Fernandéz	6	6
22	(Portugal) A. Nogueira / (Argentina) M. Goyeneche	0	1
9	(Spain) A. Salazar / (Spain) M. Calvo	6	6
2	(Argentina) D. Brea / (Spain) Triay	3	4

Semi-Finals
5	(Spain) M. Ortega / (Spain) T. Icardo	6	6
7	(Spain) A. Alonso / (Argentina) C. Jensen	4	2
3	(Spain) B. González / (Spain) C. Fernandéz	6	6
9	(Spain) A. Salazar / (Spain) M. Calvo	2	4

Finals
5	(Spain) M. Ortega / (Spain) T. Icardo	2	1
3	(Spain) B. González / (Spain) C. Fernandéz	6	6

== Results ==
=== First Round ===
Men's

Date	Winners	Score	Opponent	Refs.
14/7/2025	(Spain) Gonzalo Rubio (Spain) Javi Ruiz	7–6 / 6–4	(Spain) Jose Sanchez Serrano (Spain) Juan Zamora Perez	
15/7/2025	(Spain) Pablo García Rodrigo (Spain) Pincho Fernandez	3–6 / 6–1 / 6–2	(Spain) Javier Martinez Vazquez (Spain) Miguel Benitez	
15/7/2025	(Spain) Diego Gil Batista (Spain) Ignacio Sager	1–6 / 6–3 / 6–4	(Spain) Alberto Garcia Trabanco (Spain) Ivan Ramirez	
14/7/2025	(Spain) Enrique Goenaga (Spain) Luis Hernandez Quesada	6–3 / 6–2	(Spain) Ignacio Vilariño (Spain) Salvador Oria	
15/7/2025	(Spain) Alvaro Montiel (Italy) Flavio Abbate	3–6 / 7–6 / 6–4	(Spain) Jose Luis Gonzalez (Italy) Marco Cassetta	
14/7/2025	(Spain) Alvero Cepero (Argentina) Eduardo Agustin Torre	6–3 / 4–6 / 7–6	(Argentina) Juan Cruz Belluati (Spain) Pablo Lijó	
15/7/2025	(Argentina) Agustín Gutiérrez (Chile) Javier Valdes	6–7 / 7–6 / 6–3	(Spain) Andres Fernandez Lancha (Italy) Enzo Jensen	
15/7/2025	(Portugal) Miguel Deus (Portugal) Nuno Deus	6–3 / 6–2	(Italy) Facundo Dominguez (Spain) Jesus Moya	
14/7/2025	(Spain) David Gala Sanchez (Brazil) Lucas Campagnolo	7–5 / 6–2	(Italy) Aris Patiniotis (Argentina) Gonzalo Alfonso	
15/7/2025	(Spain) Aimar Goñi (Spain) Mario Ortega	1–6 / 6–2 / 6–2	(Argentina) Federico Mouriño (Argentina) Ramiro Valenzuela	
15/7/2025	(Spain) Alonso Rodriguez (Argentina) Juan Ignacio Rubini	6–3 / 7–6	(Spain) Adrian Marques (Spain) Marc Sintes	
15/7/2025	(Spain) Mario Del Castillo (Argentina) Miguel Lamperti	6–3 / 2–2 / W.O.	(Spain) Francisco Cabeza (Argentina) Ramiro Moyano	
14/7/2025	(Spain) Daniel Santigosa (Spain) Emilio Sanchez Chamero	7–6 / 6–4	(Spain) Pepe Aliaga (Sweden) Simon Vasquez	
14/7/2025	(Spain) Francisco Gil Morales (Argentina) Maxi Sánchez	6–4 / 6–4	(Argentina) Ignacio Piotto (Spain) Javier Rico	
15/7/2025	(Argentina) Cristian German Gutiérrez (Argentina) Facundo Lopez	6–2 / 7–6	(Spain) Jose Jimenez Casas (Spain) Teodoro Zapata	
15/7/2025	(Spain) Guillermo Collado (Spain) Pol Hernandez	6–1 / 6–1	(Spain) Diego Garcia (Argentina) Juan Ignacio De Pascual	

=== Round of 32 ===
Men's

Date	Winners	Score	Opponent	Refs.
16/7/2025	(Argentina) Agustín Tapia (Spain) Arturo Coello	6–2 / 6–4	(Spain) Gonzalo Rubio (Spain) Javi Ruiz	
16/7/2025	(Spain) Pablo García Rodrigo (Spain) Pincho Fernandez	6–2 / 2–6 / 6–3	(Spain) Eduardo Alonso (Spain) Jairo Bautista	
16/7/2025	(Spain) Aléx Ruiz (Spain) Victor Ruiz	4–6 / 7–6 / 6–1	(Spain) Diego Gil Batista (Spain) Ignacio Sager	
16/7/2025	(Argentina) Juan Tello (Argentina) Martin Di Nenno	6–2 / 1–6 / 6–4	(Spain) Enrique Goenaga (Spain) Luis Hernandez Quesada	
16/7/2025	(Brazil) Lucas Bergamini (Spain) Paquito Navarro	6–3 / 6–1	(Spain) Alvaro Montiel (Italy) Flavio Abbate	
16/7/2025	(Spain) Alvero Cepero (Argentina) Eduardo Agustin Torre	7–6 / 6–3	(Spain) Javier Garrido (Argentina) Sanyo Gutiérrez	
16/7/2025	(Argentina) Alex Chozas (Argentina) Leonel Aguirre	6–3 / 7–6	(Argentina) Agustín Gutiérrez (Chile) Javier Valdes	
16/7/2025	(Portugal) Miguel Deus (Portugal) Nuno Deus	3–0 / W.O.	(Spain) Jon Sanz (Spain) Momo Gonzalez	
16/7/2025	(Spain) Coki Nieto (Spain) Mike Yanguas	6–4 / 6–3	(Spain) David Gala Sanchez (Brazil) Lucas Campagnolo	
16/7/2025	(Spain) Francisco Guerrero (Spain) Javier Leal	6–2 / 7–6	(Spain) Aimar Goñi (Spain) Mario Ortega	
16/7/2025	(Spain) Jose García Diestro (Spain) Juanlu Esbri	6–0 / 6–3	(Spain) Alonso Rodriguez (Argentina) Juan Ignacio Rubini	
16/7/2025	(Argentina) Leandro Augsburger (Spain) Pablo Cardona	6–3 / 6–4	(Spain) Mario Del Castillo (Argentina) Miguel Lamperti	
16/7/2025	(Argentina) Franco Stupaczuk (Argentina) Maximiliano Arce	6–2 / 6–3	(Spain) Daniel Santigosa (Spain) Emilio Sanchez Chamero	
16/7/2025	(Spain) Javier Barahona (Spain) Javier García Mora	4–6 / 6–3 / 6–2	(Spain) Francisco Gil Morales (Argentina) Maxi Sánchez	
16/7/2025	(Spain) Alex Arroyo (United Arab Emirates) Iñigo Jofre	6–3 / 7–6	(Argentina) Cristian German Gutiérrez (Argentina) Facundo Lopez	
16/7/2025	(Spain) Alejandro Galán (Argentina) Federico Chingotto	6–2 / 6–0	(Spain) Guillermo Collado (Spain) Pol Hernandez	

Women's

Date	Winners	Score	Opponent	Refs.
16/7/2025	(Spain) Marta Talavan (Spain) Teresa Navarro	6–1 / 6–1	(Spain) Barbara Las Heras (Italy) Giorgia Marchetti	
16/7/2025	(Argentina) Julieta Bidahorria (Spain) Lara Arruabarrena	7–5 / 6–4	(Spain) Beatriz Caldera (Spain) Carmen Goenaga	
16/7/2025	(Spain) Marta Ortega (Spain) Tamara Icardo	6–4 / 6–2	(Italy) Carolina Orsi (Spain) Nuria Rodriguez	
15/7/2025	(Spain) Alejandra Alonso (Argentina) Claudia Jensen	5–2 / W.O.	(Russia) Ksenia Sharifova (Spain) Laia Rodriguez Abajo	
15/7/2025	(Spain) Marina Guinart (Spain) Victoria Iglesias	7–6 / 4–6 / 6–1	(Spain) Agueda Perez (Spain) Marta Borrero	
15/7/2025	(Spain) Carla Mesa (Spain) Sara Ruiz Soto	7–5 / 6–2	(Spain) Jessica Castelló (Spain) Lorena Rufo	
15/7/2025	(Spain) Raquel Eugenio Barrera (Argentina) Virginia Riera	3–6 / 6–3 / 6–2	(Spain) Marta Barrera (Spain) Marta Caparrós	
15/7/2025	(Sweden) Carolina Navarro Björk (Spain) Melania Merino	6–4 / 1–6 / 6–3	(France) Alix Collombon (Spain) Araceli Martinez	
15/7/2025	(Portugal) Ana Catarina Nogueira (Argentina) Martina Fassio Goyeneche	6–4 / 0–6 / 6–4	(Argentina) Aranzazu Osoro (Spain) Verónica Virseda	
15/7/2025	(Spain) Lucia Sainz (Spain) Patricia Llaguno	6–1 / 6–2	(Spain) Jana Montes (Spain) Marta Arellano	
15/7/2025	(Spain) Alejandra Salazar (Spain) Martina Calvo	6–7 / 6–4 / 6–3	(Spain) Lucia Martinez Gomez (Spain) Marta Marrero	
15/7/2025	(Spain) Marina Martinez Lobo (Spain) Sofía Saiz Vallejo	6–2 / 6–4	(Spain) Jimena Velasco (Spain) Noa Canovas	

=== Round of 16 ===
Men's

Date	Winners	Score	Opponent	Refs.
17/7/2025	(Argentina) Agustín Tapia (Spain) Arturo Coello	6–0 / 6–2	(Spain) Pablo García Rodrigo (Spain) Pincho Fernandez	
17/7/2025	(Argentina) Juan Tello (Argentina) Martin Di Nenno	6–2 / 7–6	(Spain) Aléx Ruiz (Spain) Victor Ruiz	
17/7/2025	(Brazil) Lucas Bergamini (Spain) Paquito Navarro	6–2 / 6–2	(Spain) Alvero Cepero (Argentina) Eduardo Agustin Torre	
17/7/2025	(Argentina) Alex Chozas (Argentina) Leonel Aguirre	3–6 / 7–6 / 6–4	(Portugal) Miguel Deus (Portugal) Nuno Deus	
17/7/2025	(Spain) Coki Nieto (Spain) Mike Yanguas	6–2 / 6–4	(Spain) Francisco Guerrero (Spain) Javier Leal	
17/7/2025	(Argentina) Leandro Augsburger (Spain) Pablo Cardona	6–4 / 7–6	(Spain) Jose García Diestro (Spain) Juanlu Esbri	
17/7/2025	(Argentina) Franco Stupaczuk (Argentina) Maximiliano Arce	6–1 / 6–1	(Spain) Javier Barahona (Spain) Javier García Mora	
17/7/2025	(Spain) Alejandro Galán (Argentina) Federico Chingotto	W.O.	(Spain) Alex Arroyo (United Arab Emirates) Iñigo Jofre	

Women's

Date	Winners	Score	Opponent	Refs.
17/7/2025	(Spain) Ariana Sánchez (Spain) Paula Josemaría	6–3 / 6–2	(Spain) Marta Talavan (Spain) Teresa Navarro	
17/7/2025	(Spain) Marta Ortega (Spain) Tamara Icardo	6–0 / 6–2	(Argentina) Julieta Bidahorria (Spain) Lara Arruabarrena	
17/7/2025	(Spain) Alejandra Alonso (Argentina) Claudia Jensen	6–3 / 6–1	(Spain) Marina Guinart (Spain) Victoria Iglesias	
17/7/2025	(Spain) Andrea Ustero (Portugal) Sofia Araújo	6–2 / 6–7 / 6–4	(Spain) Carla Mesa (Spain) Sara Ruiz Soto	
17/7/2025	(Spain) Bea González (Spain) Claudia Fernández	6–1 / 6–3	(Spain) Raquel Eugenio Barrera (Argentina) Virginia Riera	
17/7/2025	(Portugal) Ana Catarina Nogueira (Argentina) Martina Fassio Goyeneche	7–5 / 6–4	(Sweden) Carolina Navarro Björk (Spain) Melania Merino	
17/7/2025	(Spain) Alejandra Salazar (Spain) Martina Calvo	7–5 / 6–1	(Spain) Lucia Sainz (Spain) Patricia Llaguno	
17/7/2025	(Argentina) Delfina Brea (Spain) Gemma Triay	6–2 / 6–1	(Spain) Marina Martinez Lobo (Spain) Sofía Saiz Vallejo	

=== Quarter-Finals ===
Men's

Date	Winners	Score	Opponent	Refs.
18/7/2025	(Argentina) Agustín Tapia (Spain) Arturo Coello	6–4 / 6–3	(Argentina) Juan Tello (Argentina) Martin Di Nenno	
18/7/2025	(Brazil) Lucas Bergamini (Spain) Paquito Navarro	6–0 / 6–2	(Argentina) Alex Chozas (Argentina) Leonel Aguirre	
18/7/2025	(Spain) Coki Nieto (Spain) Mike Yanguas	6–4 / 6–3	(Argentina) Leandro Augsburger (Spain) Pablo Cardona	
18/7/2025	(Spain) Alejandro Galán (Argentina) Federico Chingotto	7–5 / 6–4	(Argentina) Franco Stupaczuk (Argentina) Maximiliano Arce	

Women's

Date	Winners	Score	Opponent	Refs.
18/7/2025	(Spain) Marta Ortega (Spain) Tamara Icardo	4–6 / 6–3 / 6–2	(Spain) Ariana Sánchez (Spain) Paula Josemaría	
18/7/2025	(Spain) Alejandra Alonso (Argentina) Claudia Jensen	6–1 / 6–3	(Spain) Andrea Ustero (Portugal) Sofia Araújo	
18/7/2025	(Spain) Bea González (Spain) Claudia Fernández	6–0 / 6–1	(Portugal) Ana Catarina Nogueira (Argentina) Martina Fassio Goyeneche	
18/7/2025	(Spain) Alejandra Salazar (Spain) Martina Calvo	6–3 / 6–4	(Argentina) Delfina Brea (Spain) Gemma Triay	

=== Semi-Finals ===
Men's

Date	Winners	Score	Opponent	Refs.
19/7/2025	(Argentina) Agustín Tapia (Spain) Arturo Coello	6–4 / 6–0	(Brazil) Lucas Bergamini (Spain) Paquito Navarro	
19/7/2025	(Spain) Alejandro Galán (Argentina) Federico Chingotto	1–6 / 6–4 / 7–6	(Spain) Coki Nieto (Spain) Mike Yanguas	

Women's

Date	Winners	Score	Opponent	Refs.
19/7/2025	(Spain) Marta Ortega (Spain) Tamara Icardo	6–4 / 6–2	(Spain) Alejandra Alonso (Argentina) Claudia Jensen	
19/7/2025	(Spain) Bea González (Spain) Claudia Fernández	6–2 / 6–4	(Spain) Alejandra Salazar (Spain) Martina Calvo	

=== Finals ===
Men's

Date	Winners	Score	Opponent	Refs.
20/7/2025	(Argentina) Agustín Tapia (Spain) Arturo Coello	6–4 / 7–5	(Spain) Alejandro Galán (Argentina) Federico Chingotto	

Women's

Date	Winners	Score	Opponent	Refs.
20/7/2025	(Spain) Bea González (Spain) Claudia Fernández	6–2 / 6–1	(Spain) Marta Ortega (Spain) Tamara Icardo	
