= 2025 Italy Major =

Padel championships

- Date: 8 – 15 June
- Edition: 4th
- Category: Major
- Prize money: €1.029.558
- Location: Rome, Italy
- Venue: Foro Italico

Champions
- Men's doubles: (Spain) Alejandro Galán (Argentina) Federico Chingotto
- Women's doubles: (Argentina) Delfina Brea (Spain) Gemma Triay

Chronology

The 2025 Italy Major (officially 2025 Premier Padel BNL Italy Major) was the tenth tournament of the fourth season organized by Premier Padel, the premier padel circuit, promoted by the International Padel Federation, and with the financial backing of Nasser Al-Khelaïfi's Qatar Sports Investments.

In the women's category, the number 1 and number 2 ranked pairs from the FIP faced each other in the final for the sixth time. Delfina Brea and Gemma Triay defeated Ariana Sánchez and Paula Josemaría for the fourth time, thereby securing their fifth title of 2025.

In the men's category, the top two ranked pairs both reached the final, setting up the third 'SuperClásico' of 2025. In the title match, world number 2s Alejandro Galán and Federico Chingotto defeated Agustín Tapia and Arturo Coello in straight sets, claiming their fourth title of the season.

== Relevant Data ==
=== Olympic Champions debut ===
Sara Errani, an Olympic doubles champion at the 2024 Summer Olympics, competed alongside Giulia Dal Pozzo (ranked No. 100) in the Rome Major thanks to a wild card. Having previously competed, earlier this year participating in the FIP Silver tournament in Melbourne (reaching the Round of 16) and the FIP Gold in Dubai (Round of 32), she had accumulated 13 ranking points and reached the 450th position.

=== 'ChinGálan' ends losing streak ===
With the victory in the finals, Alejandro Galán and Federico Chingotto ended a losing streak against Agustín Tapia and Arturo Coello, which include nine consecutive finals and 343 days during which they had failed to beat the world number ones. With this result, the head-to-head record since Chingotto and Galán teamed up now stands at 12–6 in favor of the duo from Catamarca and Valladolid.

=== Gemma back at the top ===
With the victory alongside Delfina Brea at the Italy Major, Gemma Triay once again secured the top spot in the FIP rankings, a position she reclaimed after more than two years, though she held it for only a week before losing it to Ariana Sanchéz and Paula Josemaria following their success at the Buenos Aires P1.

== Seeds ==
Male

Rnk.	Team	FIP Ranking Points
1	(Argentina) Agustín Tapia (Spain) Arturo Coello	36080
2	(Spain) Alejandro Galán (Argentina) Federico Chingotto	26100
3	(Argentina) Franco Stupaczuk (Spain) Juan Lebrón	16435
4	(Spain) Coki Nieto (Spain) Mike Yanguas	13615
5	(Spain) Jon Sanz (Spain) Momo Gonzalez	10690
6	(Brazil) Lucas Bergamini (Spain) Paquito Navarro	9720
7	(Argentina) Juan Tello (Argentina) Martin Di Nenno	9290
8	(Argentina) Leandro Augsburguer (Spain) Pablo Cardona	6867
9	(Spain) Eduardo Alonso (Spain) Jairo Bautista	6529
10	(Spain) Javi Garrido (Argentina) Valentino Libaak	5245
11	(Spain) Alejandro Ruiz (Argentina) Maxi Sánchez	4638
12	(Spain) Alejandro Arroyo (United Arab Emirates) Inigo Jofre	4163
13	(Spain) Francisco Guerrero (Spain) Javi Leal	4147
14	(Spain) Javier Barahona (Spain) Javier Garcia Mora	4015
15	(Argentina) Alex Chozas (Argentina) Sanyo Gutiérrez	3919
16	(Spain) Jose Garcia Diestro (Spain) Juanlu Esbri	3648

Female

Rnk.	Team	FIP Ranking Points
1	(Spain) Ariana Sánchez (Spain) Paula Josemaria	33520
2	(Argentina) Delfina Brea (Spain) Gemma Triay	27960
3	(Spain) Bea González (Spain) Claudia Fernandéz	20250
4	(Spain) Andrea Ustero (Portugal) Sofia Araújo	12780
5	(Spain) Alejandra Alonso (Spain) Marta Ortega	11500
6	(Spain) Alejandra Salazar (Spain) Veronica Virseda	9940
7	(Spain) Lucia Sainz (Spain) Patricia Llaguno	9850
8	(Argentina) Claudia Jensen (Spain) Tamara Icardo	8190
9	(Argentina) Aranzazu Osoro (Spain) Martina Calvo	5477
10	(Spain) Beatriz Caldera (Spain) Carmen Goenaga	5109
11	(Spain) Marina Guinart (Spain) Victoria Iglesias	4359
12	(France) Alix Collombon (Spain) Araceli Martinez	4025
13	(Argentina) Lucia Martinez Gomez (Spain) Marta Marrero	3781
14	(Italy) Carolina Orsi (Spain) Nuria Rodriguez	3643
15	(Spain) Raquel Eugenio Barrera (Argentina) Virginia Riera	3579
16	(Russia) Ksenia Sharifova (Spain) Marta Talavan	3439

== Head-to-head record between teams ranked in the top 4 during the season ==
=== Man's ===
Record	Coello–Tapia	Galán–Chingotto	Lebrón–Stupaczuk	Coki–Yanguas
Coello–Tapia	—	2–1	1–1	2–0
Galán–Chingotto	1–2	—	3–0	2–0
Lebrón–Stupaczuk	1–1	0–3	—	—
Coki–Yanguas	0–2	0–2	—	—

=== Women's ===
Record	Ariana–Paula	D. Brea–Triay	Gonzalez–Fernandez	Araújo–Ustero	Former Pairs	Araújo–Ortega
Ariana–Paula	—	1–4	6–1	1–0		1–1
D. Brea–Triay	4–1	—	1–3	1–0		3–0
Gonzalez–Fernandez	1–6	3–1	—	—		—
Araújo–Ustero	0–1	0–1	—	—		—
Former Pairs						
Araújo–Ortega	1–1	0–3	—	—		—

Because the Santiago final ended in a draw, it is not counted.

== Draws ==
=== Men's Bracket ===
Round of 32
1	(Spain) Coello / (Argentina) Tapia	6	6
21	(Portugal) M. Deus / (Portugal) N. Deus	2	1
41	(Spain) D. Sastre / (Spain) E. Chamero	2	7	4
16	(Spain) J.G. Diestro / (Spain) J. Esbri	6	6	6
9	(Spain) E. Alonso / (Spain) J. Bautista	6	6
40	(Spain) Á. Amaya / (Italy) F. Dominguez	2	3
38	(Spain) J.L. Gonzalez / (Italy) M. Cassetta	5	3
6	(Brazil) L. Bergamini / (Spain) Paquito	7	6
7	(Argentina) J. Tello / (Argentina) Di Nenno	6	7
25	(Argentina) J.C. Belluati / (Spain) P. Lijó	3	6
24	(Spain) E. Goenaga / (Spain) L.H. Quesada	4	6
13	(Spain) F. Guerrero / (Spain) J. Leal	6	7
15	(Argentina) A. Chozas / (Argentina) Sanyo	7	3	6
29	(Spain) J. Martinez / (Spain) M. Benitez	6	6	4
23	(Spain) J.J. Casas / (Spain) T. Zapata	2	6	3
4	(Spain) Coki / (Spain) Yanguas	6	3	6
3	(Spain) J. Lebrón / (Argentina) Stupaczuk	6	6
39	(United Arab Emirates) A. Ayats / (Spain) P.G. Rodrigo	3	2
WC	(Italy) L. Di Giovanni / (Italy) S. Iacovino	0	4
14	(Spain) J. Barahona / (Spain) J.G. Mora	6	6
11	(Spain) A. Ruiz / (Argentina) Maxi	7	7
18	(Spain) F. Gil / (Spain) V. Ruiz	5	6
Q	(Spain) A.F. Lancha / (Italy) E. Jensen	2	6
5	(Spain) J. Sanz / (Spain) Momo	6	7
8	(Argentina) L. Augsburger / (Spain) P. Cardona	6	5
19	(Spain) I. Sager / (Brazil) L. Campagnolo	7	7
28	(Argentina) I. Piotto / (Spain) J. Rico	6	6	6
12	(Spain) A. Arroyo / (United Arab Emirates) I. Jofre	7	3	7
LL	(Italy) D. Perino / (Spain) M.H. Hernandez	6	6
32	(Spain) F. Cabeza / (Argentina) R. Moyano	3	4
37	(Spain) G. Collado / (Chile) J. Valdes	2	3
2	(Spain) Galán / (Argentina) Chingotto	6	6

Round of 16
1	(Spain) Coello / (Argentina) Tapia	6	6
16	(Spain) J.G. Diestro / (Spain) J. Esbri	3	2
9	(Spain) E. Alonso / (Spain) J. Bautista	6	6	1
6	(Brazil) L. Bergamini / (Spain) Paquito	7	3	6
7	(Argentina) J. Tello / (Argentina) Di Nenno	6	2
13	(Spain) F. Guerrero / (Spain) J. Leal	7	6
15	(Argentina) A. Chozas / (Argentina) Sanyo	3	5
4	(Spain) Coki / (Spain) Yanguas	6	7
3	(Spain) J. Lebrón / (Argentina) Stupaczuk	6	4	6
14	(Spain) J. Barahona / (Spain) J.G. Mora	3	6	3
11	(Spain) A. Ruiz / (Argentina) Maxi	4	4
5	(Spain) J. Sanz / (Spain) Momo	6	6
19	(Spain) I. Sager / (Brazil) L. Campagnolo	4	5
12	(Spain) A. Arroyo / (United Arab Emirates) I. Jofre	6	7
LL	(Italy) D. Perino / (Spain) M.H. Hernandez	0	2
2	(Spain) Galán / (Argentina) Chingotto	6	6

Quarter-Final
1	(Spain) Coello / (Argentina) Tapia	6	6
6	(Brazil) L. Bergamini / (Spain) Paquito	4	2
13	(Spain) F. Guerrero / (Spain) J. Leal	5	6	7
4	(Spain) Coki / (Spain) Yanguas	7	3	6
3	(Spain) J. Lebrón / (Argentina) Stupaczuk	6	6	7
5	(Spain) J. Sanz / (Spain) Momo	3	7	6
12	(Spain) A. Arroyo / (United Arab Emirates) I. Jofre	6	3
2	(Spain) Galán / (Argentina) Chingotto	7	6

Semi-Finals
1	(Spain) Coello / (Argentina) Tapia	6	6	6
13	(Spain) F. Guerrero / (Spain) J. Leal	7	2	2
3	(Spain) J. Lebrón / (Argentina) Stupaczuk	6	6	2
2	(Spain) Galán / (Argentina) Chingotto	4	7	6

Finals
1	(Spain) Coello / (Argentina) Tapia	3	5
2	(Spain) Galán / (Argentina) Chingotto	6	7

=== Women's Bracket ===
Round of 32
1	(Spain) A. Sánchez / (Spain) P. Josemaria
Bye
Q	(Spain) A. Moral / (Spain) R. Lopez Lopez	0	1
9	(Argentina) A. Osoro / (Spain) M. Calvo	6	6
12	(France) A. Collombon / (Spain) A. Martinez	1	7	6
27	(Spain) J. Bautista / (Spain) N. Aguilar	6	6	2
29	(Spain) L. Manquillo / (Spain) P. Martinez	1	1
5	(Spain) A. Alonso / (Spain) M. Ortega	6	6
7	(Spain) L. Sainz / (Spain) P. Llaguno	6	6
26	(Spain) M.R. Abajo / (Spain) S. Bellver	2	2
18	(Spain) J. Velasco / (Spain) N. Canovas	1	3
10	(Spain) B. Caldera / (Spain) C. Goenaga	6	6
13	(Spain) L. Martinez / (Spain) M. Marrero	6	6
22	(Spain) B. Las Heras / (Italy) G. Marchetti	4	4
Bye
3	(Spain) B. González / (Spain) C. Fernandéz
4	(Spain) A. Ustero / (Portugal) S. Araújo
Bye
21	(Portugal) A. Nogueira / (Argentina) M. Goyeneche	4	4
11	(Spain) M. Guinart / (Spain) V. Iglesias	6	6
14	(Italy) C. Orsi / (Spain) N. Rodriguez	7	1	3
19	(Spain) M. Barrera / (Spain) M. Caparrós	6	6	6
24	(Spain) M. Merino / (Spain) T. Navarro	4	2
6	(Spain) A. Salazar / (Spain) V. Virseda	6	6
8	(Argentina) C. Jensen / (Spain) T. Icardo	6	6
25	(Spain) A. Perez / (Spain) M. Borrero	3	4
Q	(Argentina) D. Valenzuela / (Spain) S. Pujals	4	2
16	(Russia) K. Sharifova / (Spain) M. Talavan	6	6
15	(Spain) R. Barrera / (Argentina) V. Riera	6	6
20	(Argentina) J. Bidahorria / (Spain) L. Arruabarrena	1	3
Bye
2	(Argentina) D. Brea / (Spain) G. Triay

Round of 16
1	(Spain) A. Sánchez / (Spain) P. Josemaria	6	6
9	(Argentina) A. Osoro / (Spain) M. Calvo	4	2
12	(France) A. Collombon / (Spain) A. Martinez	3	4
5	(Spain) A. Alonso / (Spain) M. Ortega	6	6
7	(Spain) L. Sainz / (Spain) P. Llaguno	6	3
10	(Spain) B. Caldera / (Spain) C. Goenaga	7	6
13	(Spain) L. Martinez / (Spain) M. Marrero	3	0
3	(Spain) B. González / (Spain) C. Fernandéz	6	6
4	(Spain) A. Ustero / (Portugal) S. Araújo	6	6	1
11	(Spain) M. Guinart / (Spain) V. Iglesias	7	4	6
19	(Spain) M. Barrera / (Spain) M. Caparrós	6	7
6	(Spain) A. Salazar / (Spain) V. Virseda	1	5
8	(Argentina) C. Jensen / (Spain) T. Icardo	6	6
16	(Russia) K. Sharifova / (Spain) M. Talavan	4	3
15	(Spain) R. Barrera / (Argentina) V. Riera	0	0
2	(Argentina) D. Brea / (Spain) G. Triay	6	6

Quarter-Final
1	(Spain) A. Sánchez / (Spain) P. Josemaria	7	5	6
5	(Spain) A. Alonso / (Spain) M. Ortega	6	7	2
10	(Spain) B. Caldera / (Spain) C. Goenaga	2	3
3	(Spain) B. González / (Spain) C. Fernandéz	6	6
11	(Spain) M. Guinart / (Spain) V. Iglesias	6	6
19	(Spain) M. Barrera / (Spain) M. Caparrós	3	3
8	(Argentina) C. Jensen / (Spain) T. Icardo	3	1
2	(Argentina) D. Brea / (Spain) G. Triay	6	6

Semi-Finals
1	(Spain) A. Sánchez / (Spain) P. Josemaria	7	6
3	(Spain) B. González / (Spain) C. Fernandéz	6	3
11	(Spain) M. Guinart / (Spain) V. Iglesias	3	1
2	(Argentina) D. Brea / (Spain) G. Triay	6	6

Finals
1	(Spain) A. Sánchez / (Spain) P. Josemaria	4	4
2	(Argentina) D. Brea / (Spain) G. Triay	6	6

== Results ==
=== First Round ===
Men's

Date	Winners	Score	Opponent	Refs.
10/6/2025	(Portugal) Miguel Deus (Portugal) Nuno Deus	4–6 / 1–1 / W.O.	(Spain) Jesus Moya (France) Thomas Leygue	
11/6/2025	(Spain) Daniel Santigosa (Spain) Emilio Sánchez Chamero	6–2 / 6–2	(Argentina) Agustin Gutiérrez (Spain) Jaime Muñoz	
10/6/2025	(Spain) Alvaro Melendez Amaya (Italy) Facundo Dominguez	6–7 / 6–2 / 6–3	(Spain) Alvero Cepero (Argentina) Eduardo Agustin Torre	
10/6/2025	(Spain) Jose Luis Gonzalez (Italy) Marco Cassetta	6–2 / 6–2	(France) Bastien Blanque (France) Johan Bergeron	
10/6/2025	(Argentina) Juan Cruz Belluati (Spain) Pablo Lijó	7–6 / 6–3	(Italy) Alvaro Montielz (Italy) Flavio Abbate	
10/6/2025	(Spain) Enrique Goenaga (Spain) Luis Hernandez Quesada	6–4 / 6–2	(Sweden) Albin Olson (Sweden) Daniel Windahl	
10/6/2025	(Spain) Javier Martinez Vazques (Spain) Miguel Benitez	7–5 / 2–6 / 7–5	(Spain) Ignacio Vilariño (Spain) Salvador Oria	
10/6/2025	(Spain) Jose Jimenez Casas (Spain) Teodoro Zapata	6–2 / 6–4	(Spain) Diego García (Spain) Jose Rico	
10/6/2025	(United Arab Emirates) Arnau Ayats (Spain) Pablo García Rodrigo	2–6 / 6–4 / 6–2	(Spain) Mario Del Castillo (Spain) Mario Ortega	
10/6/2025	(Italy) Lorenzo Di Giovanni (Italy) Simone Iacovino	7–6 / 4–6 / 6–3	(Italy) Giulio Graziotti (Italy) Simone Cremona	
10/6/2025	(Spain) Francisco Gil Morales (Spain) Victor Ruiz	6–3 / 6–2	(Spain) Gonzalo Rubio (Spain) Javi Ruiz	
10/6/2025	(Spain) Andres Fernandez Lancha (Italy) Enzo Jensen	6–7 / 7–6 / 7–5	(Spain) Pol Hernandez (Argentina) Ramiro Valenzuela	
10/6/2025	(Spain) Ignacio Sager (Brazil) Lucas Campagnolo	6–4 / 7–6	(Italy) Aris Patiniotis (Spain) David Gala Sanchez	
10/6/2025	(Argentina) Ignacio Piotto (Spain) Javier Rico	6–3 / 7–6	(Argentina) Gonzalo Alfonso (Argentina) Leonel Aguirre	
10/6/2025	(Spain) Francisco Cabeza (Argentina) Ramiro Moyano	6–4 / 6–4	(Argentina) Federico Mouriño (Spain) Pincho Fernandez	
10/6/2025	(Spain) Guillermo Collado (Chile) Javier Valdes	7–6 / 6–4	(Sweden) Adam Axelsson (Spain) Fran Ramirez	

Women's

Date	Winners	Score	Opponent	Refs.
11/6/2025	(Spain) Amanda Lopez Moral (Spain) Rebeca Lopez	7–5 / 1–6 / 7–6	(Spain) Laura Lujan Rodriguez (France) Lea Godallier	
10/6/2025	(Spain) Julia Polo Bautista (Spain) Noemi Aguilar	6–7 / 6–4 / 7–6	(Spain) Alba Perez Momha (Spain) Ana Varo Ramos	
10/6/2025	(Spain) Letizia María Manquillo (Spain) Patricia Martinez Fortun	6–1 / 6–3	(Italy) Chiara Pappacena (Italy) Martina Parmigiani	
10/6/2025	(Spain) Laia Rodriguez Abajo (Spain) Sandra Bellver	7–6 / 7–5	(Italy) Giulia Dal Pozzo (Italy) Sara Errani	
10/6/2025	(Spain) Jimena Velasco (Spain) Noa Canovas	6–7 / 6–4 / 7–6	(Spain) Marina Martinez Lobo (Spain) Sofía Saiz Vallejo	
10/6/2025	(Spain) Barbara Las Heras (Italy) Giorgia Marchetti	6–4 / 7–5	(Spain) Alba Gallardo (Italy) Carlotta Casali	
10/6/2025	(Portugal) Ana Catarina Nogueira (Argentina) Martina Fassio Goyeneche	6–2 / 6–1	(Spain) Camila Fassio Goyeneche (Spain) Monica Gomez Rivas	
10/6/2025	(Spain) Marta Barrera (Spain) Marta Caparrós	6–3 / 6–7 / 6–3	(Spain) Jana Montes Cabruja (Spain) Marta Arellano Navarro	
10/6/2025	(Spain) Melania Merino Saez (Spain) Teresa Navarro	5–7 / 6–4 / 6–3	(Spain) Carla Mesa (Spain) Sara Ruiz Soto	
10/6/2025	(Spain) Agueda Perez (Spain) Marta Borrero	6–2 / 6–3	(Spain) Aida Martinez San Juan (Spain) Ana Dominguez Gracia	
10/6/2025	(Argentina) Daiara Valenzuela (Spain) Sara Pujals	6–1 / 1–6 / 6–3	(Italy) Lorena Vano (Spain) Lucía Peralta	
10/6/2025	(Argentina) Julieta Bidahorria (Spain) Lara Arruabarrena	6–3 / 6–1	(Spain) Arantxa Soriano (Spain) Ariadna Cañellas	

=== Round of 32 ===
Men's

Date	Winners	Score	Opponent	Refs.
11/6/2025	(Argentina) Agustín Tapia (Spain) Arturo Coello	6–2 / 6–1	(Portugal) Miguel Deus (Portugal) Nuno Deus	
11/6/2025	(Spain) Jose García Diestro (Spain) Juanlu Esbri	6–2 / 6–7 / 6–4	(Spain) Daniel Santigosa (Spain) Emilio Sánchez Chamero	
11/6/2025	(Spain) Eduardo Alonso (Spain) Jairo Bautista	6–2 / 6–3	(Spain) Alvaro Melendez Amaya (Italy) Facundo Dominguez	
11/6/2025	(Brazil) Lucas Bergamini (Spain) Paquito Navarro	7–5 / 6–3	(Spain) Jose Luis Gonzalez (Italy) Marco Cassetta	
11/6/2025	(Argentina) Juan Tello (Argentina) Martin Di Nenno	6–3 / 7–6	(Argentina) Juan Cruz Belluati (Spain) Pablo Lijó	
11/6/2025	(Spain) Francisco Guerrero (Spain) Javier Leal	6–4 / 7–6	(Spain) Enrique Goenaga (Spain) Luis Hernandez Quesada	
11/6/2025	(Argentina) Alex Chozas (Argentina) Sanyo Gutiérrez	7–6 / 3–6 / 6–4	(Spain) Javier Martinez Vazques (Spain) Miguel Benitez	
11/6/2025	(Spain) Coki Nieto (Spain) Mike Yanguas	6–2 / 3–6 / 6–3	(Spain) Jose Jimenez Casas (Spain) Teodoro Zapata	
11/6/2025	(Argentina) Franco Stupaczuk (Spain) Juan Lebrón	6–3 / 6–2	(United Arab Emirates) Arnau Ayats (Spain) Pablo García Rodrigo	
11/6/2025	(Spain) Javier Barahona (Spain) Javier García Mora	6–0 / 6–4	(Italy) Lorenzo Di Giovanni (Italy) Simone Iacovino	
11/6/2025	(Spain) Aléx Ruiz (Argentina) Maxi Sánchez	7–5 / 7–6	(Spain) Francisco Gil Morales (Spain) Victor Ruiz	
11/6/2025	(Spain) Jon Sanz (Spain) Momo Gonzalez	6–2 / 7–6	(Spain) Andres Fernandez Lancha (Italy) Enzo Jensen	
11/6/2025	(Spain) Ignacio Sager (Brazil) Lucas Campagnolo	7–6 / 7–5	(Argentina) Leandro Augsburger (Spain) Pablo Cardona	
11/6/2025	(Spain) Alex Arroyo (United Arab Emirates) Iñigo Jofre	7–6 / 3–6 / 7–6	(Argentina) Ignacio Piotto (Spain) Javier Rico	
11/6/2025	(Italy) Denis Perino (Spain) Mario Huete Hernandez	6–3 / 6–4	(Spain) Francisco Cabeza (Argentina) Ramiro Moyano	
11/6/2025	(Spain) Alejandro Galán (Argentina) Federico Chingotto	6–2 / 6–3	(Spain) Guillermo Collado (Chile) Javier Valdes	

Women's

Date	Winners	Score	Opponent	Refs.
11/6/2025	(Argentina) Aranzazu Osoro (Spain) Martina Calvo	6–0 / 6–1	(Spain) Amanda Lopez Moral (Spain) Rebeca Lopez	
11/6/2025	(France) Alix Collombon (Spain) Araceli Martinez	1–6 / 7–6 / 6–2	(Spain) Julia Polo Bautista (Spain) Noemi Aguilar	
11/6/2025	(Spain) Alejandra Alonso (Spain) Marta Ortega	6–1 / 6–1	(Spain) Letizia María Manquillo (Spain) Patricia Martinez Fortun	
11/6/2025	(Spain) Lucia Sainz (Spain) Patricia Llaguno	6–2 / 6–2	(Spain) Laia Rodriguez Abajo (Spain) Sandra Bellver	
11/6/2025	(Spain) Beatriz Caldera (Spain) Carmen Goenaga	6–1 / 6–3	(Spain) Jimena Velasco (Spain) Noa Canovas	
11/6/2025	(Spain) Lucia Martinez Gomez (Spain) Marta Marrero	6–4 / 6–4	(Spain) Barbara Las Heras (Italy) Giorgia Marchetti	
11/6/2025	(Spain) Marina Guinart (Spain) Victoria Iglesias	6–4 / 6–4	(Portugal) Ana Catarina Nogueira (Argentina) Martina Fassio Goyeneche	
11/6/2025	(Spain) Marta Barrera (Spain) Marta Caparrós	6–7 / 6–1 / 6–3	(Italy) Carolina Orsi (Spain) Nuria Rodriguez	
11/6/2025	(Spain) Alejandra Salazar (Spain) Verónica Virseda	6–4 / 6–2	(Spain) Melania Merino Saez (Spain) Teresa Navarro	
11/6/2025	(Argentina) Claudia Jensen (Spain) Tamara Icardo	6–3 / 6–4	(Spain) Agueda Perez (Spain) Marta Borrero	
11/6/2025	(Russia) Ksenia Sharifova (Spain) Marta Talavan	6–4 / 6–2	(Argentina) Daiara Valenzuela (Spain) Sara Pujals	
11/6/2025	(Spain) Raquel Eugenio Barrera (Argentina) Virginia Riera	6–1 / 6–3	(Argentina) Julieta Bidahorria (Spain) Lara Arruabarrena	

=== Round of 16 ===
Men's

Date	Winners	Score	Opponent	Refs.
12/6/2025	(Argentina) Agustín Tapia (Spain) Arturo Coello	6–3 / 6–2	(Spain) Jose García Diestro (Spain) Juanlu Esbri	
12/6/2025	(Brazil) Lucas Bergamini (Spain) Paquito Navarro	7–5 / 3–6 / 6–1	(Spain) Eduardo Alonso (Spain) Jairo Bautista	
12/6/2025	(Spain) Francisco Guerrero (Spain) Javier Leal	7–6 / 6–2	(Argentina) Juan Tello (Argentina) Martin Di Nenno	
12/6/2025	(Spain) Coki Nieto (Spain) Mike Yanguas	6–3 / 7–5	(Argentina) Alex Chozas (Argentina) Sanyo Gutiérrez	
12/6/2025	(Argentina) Franco Stupaczuk (Spain) Juan Lebrón	6–3 / 4–6 / 6–3	(Spain) Javier Barahona (Spain) Javier García Mora	
12/6/2025	(Spain) Jon Sanz (Spain) Momo Gonzalez	6–4 / 6–4	(Spain) Aléx Ruiz (Argentina) Maxi Sánchez	
12/6/2025	(Spain) Alex Arroyo (United Arab Emirates) Iñigo Jofre	6–4 / 7–5	(Spain) Ignacio Sager (Brazil) Lucas Campagnolo	
12/6/2025	(Spain) Alejandro Galán (Argentina) Federico Chingotto	6–0 / 6–2	(Italy) Denis Perino (Spain) Mario Huete Hernandez	

Women's

Date	Winners	Score	Opponent	Refs.
12/6/2025	(Spain) Ariana Sánchez (Spain) Paula Josemaría	6–4 / 6–2	(Argentina) Aranzazu Osoro (Spain) Martina Calvo	
12/6/2025	(Spain) Alejandra Alonso (Spain) Marta Ortega	6–3 / 6–4	(France) Alix Collombon (Spain) Araceli Martinez	
12/6/2025	(Spain) Beatriz Caldera (Spain) Carmen Goenaga	7–6 / 6–3	(Spain) Lucia Sainz (Spain) Patricia Llaguno	
12/6/2025	(Spain) Bea González (Spain) Claudia Fernández	6–3 / 6–0	(Spain) Lucia Martinez Gomez (Spain) Marta Marrero	
12/6/2025	(Spain) Marina Guinart (Spain) Victoria Iglesias	7–6 / 4–6 / 6–1	(Spain) Andrea Ustero (Portugal) Sofia Araújo	
12/6/2025	(Spain) Marta Barrera (Spain) Marta Caparrós	6–1 / 7–5	(Spain) Alejandra Salazar (Spain) Verónica Virseda	
12/6/2025	(Argentina) Claudia Jensen (Spain) Tamara Icardo	6–4 / 6–3	(Russia) Ksenia Sharifova (Spain) Marta Talavan	
12/6/2025	(Argentina) Delfina Brea (Spain) Gemma Triay	6–0 / 6–0	(Spain) Raquel Eugenio Barrera (Argentina) Virginia Riera	

=== Quarter-Finals ===
Men's

Date	Winners	Score	Opponent	Refs.
13/6/2025	(Argentina) Agustín Tapia (Spain) Arturo Coello	6–4 / 6–2	(Brazil) Lucas Bergamini (Spain) Paquito Navarro	
13/6/2025	(Spain) Francisco Guerrero (Spain) Javier Leal	5–7 / 6–3 / 7–6	(Spain) Coki Nieto (Spain) Mike Yanguas	
13/6/2025	(Argentina) Franco Stupaczuk (Spain) Juan Lebrón	6–3 / 6–7 / 7–6	(Spain) Jon Sanz (Spain) Momo Gonzalez	
13/6/2025	(Spain) Alejandro Galán (Argentina) Federico Chingotto	7–6 / 6–3	(Spain) Alex Arroyo (United Arab Emirates) Iñigo Jofre	

Women's

Date	Winners	Score	Opponent	Refs.
13/6/2025	(Spain) Ariana Sánchez (Spain) Paula Josemaría	7–6 / 5–7 / 6–2	(Spain) Alejandra Alonso (Spain) Marta Ortega	
13/6/2025	(Spain) Bea González (Spain) Claudia Fernández	6–2 / 6–3	(Spain) Beatriz Caldera (Spain) Carmen Goenaga	
13/6/2025	(Spain) Marina Guinart (Spain) Victoria Iglesias	6–3 / 6–3	(Spain) Marta Barrera (Spain) Marta Caparrós	
13/6/2025	(Argentina) Delfina Brea (Spain) Gemma Triay	6–3 / 6–1	(Argentina) Claudia Jensen (Spain) Tamara Icardo	

=== Semi-Finals ===
Men's

Date	Winners	Score	Opponent	Refs.
14/6/2025	(Argentina) Agustín Tapia (Spain) Arturo Coello	6–7 / 6–2 / 6–2	(Spain) Francisco Guerrero (Spain) Javier Leal	
14/6/2025	(Spain) Alejandro Galán (Argentina) Federico Chingotto	4–6 / 7–6 / 6–2	(Argentina) Franco Stupaczuk (Spain) Juan Lebrón	

Women's

Date	Winners	Score	Opponent	Refs.
14/6/2025	(Spain) Ariana Sánchez (Spain) Paula Josemaría	7–6 / 6–3	(Spain) Bea González (Spain) Claudia Fernández	
14/6/2025	(Argentina) Delfina Brea (Spain) Gemma Triay	6–3 / 6–1	(Spain) Marina Guinart (Spain) Victoria Iglesias	

=== Finals ===
Men's

Date	Winners	Score	Opponent	Refs.
15/6/2025	(Spain) Alejandro Galán (Argentina) Federico Chingotto	6–3 / 7–5	(Argentina) Agustín Tapia (Spain) Arturo Coello	

Women's

Date	Winners	Score	Opponent	Refs.
15/6/2025	(Argentina) Delfina Brea (Spain) Gemma Triay	6–4 / 6–4	(Spain) Ariana Sánchez (Spain) Paula Josemaría	
