= 2025 Asunción P2 =

Padel championships

- Date: 18 – 25 May
- Edition: 2nd
- Category: P2
- Prize money: €262.250
- Location: Asunción, Paraguay
- Venue: SND Arena

Champions
- Men's doubles: (Spain) Alejandro Galán (Argentina) Federico Chingotto
- Women's doubles: (Spain) Bea González (Spain) Claudia Fernández

Chronology

The 2025 Asunción P2 (officially 2025 Premier Padel Ueno Bank Asunción P2) was the eight tournament of the fourth season organized by Premier Padel, the premier padel circuit, promoted by the International Padel Federation, and with the financial backing of Nasser Al-Khelaïfi's Qatar Sports Investments.

In the women's category, the second and third ranked pairs in the FIP rankings reached the finals. Bea González and Claudia Fernández defeated Delfina Brea and Gemma Triay, who were playing in their seventh consecutive final, to become the first pair outside the top two to win a title in 2025.

In the men's category, Leo Augsburger and Pablo Cardona became the first pair outside the top 3 to reach a final in 2025. In the finals, they faced, and lost to, Alejandro Galán and Federico Chingotto, handing the number 2 pair their third title of the year.

== Relevant Data ==
=== Gemma Triay Reclaims the Women's Throne ===
Thanks to Gemma Triay semifinal victory alongside Delfina Brea and the defeat of Ariana Sánchez and Paula Josemaría, Gemma reclaimed the world number one ranking after two years.

== Seeds ==
Male

Rnk.	Team	FIP Ranking Points
1	(Argentina) Agustín Tapia (Spain) Arturo Coello	38100
2	(Spain) Alejandro Galán (Argentina) Federico Chingotto	27980
3	(Argentina) Franco Stupaczuk (Spain) Juan Lebrón	17425
4	(Spain) Coki Nieto (Spain) Mike Yanguas	14230
5	(Spain) Jon Sanz (Spain) Momo Gonzalez	10465
6	(Argentina) Juan Tello (Argentina) Martin Di Nenno	9920
7	(Brazil) Lucas Bergamini (Spain) Paquito Navarro	9195
8	(Spain) Eduardo Alonso (Spain) Jairo Bautista	6492
9	(Argentina) Leandro Augsburguer (Spain) Pablo Cardona	6226
10	(Spain) Javi Garrido (Argentina) Valentino Libaak	5861
11	(Spain) Alejandro Ruiz (Argentina) Maxi Sánchez	5139
12	(Spain) Francisco Guerrero (Spain) Javi Leal	4223
13	(Spain) Alejandro Arroyo (United Arab Emirates) Inigo Jofre	4050
14	(Argentina) Alex Chozas (Argentina) Sanyo Gutiérrez	3949
15	(Argentina) Gonzalo Alfonso (Argentina) Leonel Aguirre	3328
16	(Spain) Jose Garcia Diestro (Spain) Juanlu Esbri	3281

Female

Rnk.	Team	FIP Ranking Points
1	(Spain) Ariana Sánchez (Spain) Paula Josemaria	34240
2	(Argentina) Delfina Brea (Spain) Gemma Triay	29120
3	(Spain) Bea González (Spain) Claudia Fernandéz	20540
4	(Spain) Andrea Ustero (Portugal) Sofia Araújo	13090
5	(Spain) Alejandra Alonso (Spain) Marta Ortega	12305
6	(Spain) Lucia Sainz (Spain) Patricia Llaguno	10915
7	(Spain) Alejandra Salazar (Spain) Veronica Virseda	10390
8	(Argentina) Claudia Jensen (Spain) Tamara Icardo	8120
9	(Spain) Jessica Castelló (Spain) Lorena Rufo	6990
10	(Spain) Beatriz Caldera (Spain) Carmen Goenaga	4849
11	(Argentina) Aranzazu Osoro (Spain) Martina Calvo	4787
12	(Spain) Marina Guinart (Spain) Victoria Iglesias	4539
13	(France) Alix Collombon (Spain) Araceli Martinez	4047
14	(Italy) Carolina Orsi (Spain) Nuria Rodriguez	3973
15	(Argentina) Lucia Martinez Gomez (Spain) Marta Marrero	3686
16	(Russia) Ksenia Sharifova (Spain) Marta Talavan	3461

== Head-to-head record between teams ranked in the top 4 during the season ==
=== Man's ===
Record	Coello–Tapia	Galán–Chingotto	Lebrón–Stupaczuk	Coki–Yanguas
Coello–Tapia	—	2–0	1–1	2–0
Galán–Chingotto	0–2	—	2–0	2–0
Lebrón–Stupaczuk	1–1	0–2	—	—
Coki–Yanguas	0–2	0–2	—	—

=== Women's ===
Record	Ariana–Paula	D. Brea–Triay	Gonzalez–Fernandez	Araújo–Ustero	Former Pairs	Araújo–Ortega
Ariana–Paula	—	1–3	4–1	—		1–1
D. Brea–Triay	3–1	—	1–2	1–0		3–0
Gonzalez–Fernandez	1–4	2–1	—	—		—
Araújo–Ustero	—	0–1	—	—		—
Former Pairs						
Araújo–Ortega	1–1	0–3	—	—		—

Because the Santiago final ended in a draw, it is not counted.

== Draws ==
=== Men's Bracket ===
Round of 32
1	(Spain) Coello / (Argentina) Tapia	6	6
21	(Portugal) M. Deus / (Portugal) N. Deus	3	2
23	(Spain) E. Goenaga / (Spain) L.H. Quesada	3	7	7
Q	(Spain) A.F. Lancha / (Italy) E. Jensen	6	5	6
16	(Spain) J. Esbri / (Spain) S. Oria	3	7	6
10	(Spain) J. Garrido / (Argentina) V. Libaak	6	5	3
26	(Italy) A. Patiniotis / (Spain) D. Sanchez	6	3
7	(Brazil) L. Bergamini / (Spain) Paquito	7	6
5	(Spain) J. Sanz / (Spain) Momo	4	6	6
15	(Argentina) G. Alfonso / (Argentina) L. Aguirre	6	2	3
9	(Argentina) L. Augsburger / (Spain) P. Cardona	6	6	6
Q	(Spain) G. Losada / (Chile) J. Valdes	3	7	4
WC	(Paraguay) F. Dehnike / (Spain) M. Herrera	0	2
25	(Argentina) F. Mouriño / (Spain) P. Fernandez	6	6
Q	(Argentina) A. Gutiérrez / (Spain) J. Munoz	0	2
3	(Spain) Lebrón / (Argentina) Stupaczuk	6	6
4	(Spain) Coki / (Spain) Yanguas	6	6
17	(Spain) I. Sager / (Brazil) L. Campagnolo	2	3
Q	(Spain) I. Ramirez / (Spain) M. Ortega	2	4
18	(Spain) F. Gil / (Spain) V. Ruiz	6	6
20	(Spain) J.J. Casas / (Spain) T. Zapata	4	1
13	(Spain) A. Arroyo / (United Arab Emirates) I. Jofre	6	6
22	(Spain) A. Cepero / (Argentina) E. Torre	3	6	3
6	(Argentina) J. Tello / (Argentina) Di Nenno	6	1	6
8	(Spain) E. Alonso / (Spain) J. Bautista	2	4
19	(Spain) G. Rubio / (Spain) P. Lijó	6	6
14	(Argentina) A. Chozas / (Argentina) Gutiérrez	6	4	6
24	(Argentina) J.C. Belluati / (Spain) P. Lijó	4	6	3
11	(Spain) A. Ruiz / (Argentina) Maxi	3	4
12	(Spain) F. Guerrero / (Spain) J. Leal	6	6
WC	(Paraguay) M. San Martin / (Paraguay) M. Abud	3	3
2	(Spain) Galán / (Argentina) Chingotto	6	6

Round of 16
1	(Spain) Coello / (Argentina) Tapia	6	6
23	(Spain) E. Goenaga / (Spain) L.H. Quesada	2	1
16	(Spain) J. Esbri / (Spain) S. Oria	6	7
7	(Brazil) L. Bergamini / (Spain) Paquito	4	6
5	(Spain) J. Sanz / (Spain) Momo	6	4
9	(Argentina) L. Augsburger / (Spain) P. Cardona	7	6
25	(Argentina) F. Mouriño / (Spain) P. Fernandez	0	3
3	(Spain) Lebrón / (Argentina) Stupaczuk	6	6
4	(Spain) Coki / (Spain) Yanguas	6	3	4
18	(Spain) F. Gil / (Spain) V. Ruiz	3	6	6
13	(Spain) A. Arroyo / (United Arab Emirates) I. Jofre	4	3
6	(Argentina) J. Tello / (Argentina) Di Nenno	6	6
19	(Spain) G. Rubio / (Spain) P. Lijó	6	3	1
14	(Argentina) A. Chozas / (Argentina) Gutiérrez	1	6	6
12	(Spain) F. Guerrero / (Spain) J. Leal	2	4
2	(Spain) Galán / (Argentina) Chingotto	6	6

Quarter-Final
1	(Spain) Coello / (Argentina) Tapia	3	6	6
16	(Spain) J. Esbri / (Spain) S. Oria	6	2	7
9	(Argentina) L. Augsburger / (Spain) P. Cardona	6	5	6
3	(Spain) Lebrón / (Argentina) Stupaczuk	3	7	2
18	(Spain) F. Gil / (Spain) V. Ruiz	1	1
5	(Argentina) J. Tello / (Argentina) Di Nenno	6	1	*
14	(Argentina) A. Chozas / (Argentina) Gutiérrez	0	2
2	(Spain) Galán / (Argentina) Chingotto	6	6

Semi-Finals
16	(Spain) J. Esbri / (Spain) S. Oria	4	4
9	(Argentina) L. Augsburger / (Spain) P. Cardona	6	6
5	(Argentina) J. Tello / (Argentina) Di Nenno	2	3
2	(Spain) Galán / (Argentina) Chingotto	6	6

Finals
9	(Argentina) L. Augsburger / (Spain) P. Cardona	6	1
2	(Spain) Galán / (Argentina) Chingotto	7	6

=== Women's Bracket ===
Round of 32
1	(Spain) A. Sánchez / (Spain) P. Josemaria
Bye
12	(Spain) M. Guinart / (Spain) V. Iglesias	6	6
18	(Spain) M. Barrera / (Spain) M. Caparrós	4	4
17	(Spain) C. Mesa / (Spain) S. Ruiz	6	6
LL	(Colombia) L. Arciniegas / (Argentina) M. Ernandorena	0	1
Bye
5	(Spain) A. Alonso / (Spain) M. Ortega
8	(Argentina) C. Jensen / (Spain) T. Icardo
Bye
14	(Italy) C. Orsi / (Spain) N. Rodriguez	6	6	6
Q	(Spain) J. Cabruja / (Spain) M. Arellano	2	7	2
Q	(Spain) A. Perez / (Spain) M. Merino	4	4
9	(Spain) L. Rufo / (Spain) J. Castelló	6	6
Bye
3	(Spain) B. González / (Spain) C. Fernandéz
4	(Spain) A. Ustero / (Portugal) S. Araújo
Bye
19	(Argentina) J. Bidahorria / (Argentina) M. Goyeneche	4	4
10	(Spain) B. Caldera / (Spain) C. Goenaga	6	6
Q	(Chile) C. Arancibia / (Chile) K. Carrasco	3	0
16	(Russia) K. Sharifova / (Spain) M. Talavan	6	6
Bye
6	(Spain) L. Sainz / (Spain) P. Llaguno
7	(Spain) A. Salazar / (Spain) V. Virseda
Bye
Q	(Spain) M. Lobo / (Spain) S. Saiz	4	7	2
11	(Argentina) A. Osoro / (Spain) M. Calvo	6	6	6
WC	(Paraguay) C. Acuña / (Paraguay) V. Royg
13	(France) A. Collombon / (Spain) A. Martinez	6	6
Bye
2	(Argentina) D. Brea / (Spain) G. Triay

Round of 16
1	(Spain) A. Sánchez / (Spain) P. Josemaria	6	6
12	(Spain) M. Guinart / (Spain) V. Iglesias	1	1
17	(Spain) C. Mesa / (Spain) S. Ruiz	3	7	4
5	(Spain) A. Alonso / (Spain) M. Ortega	6	6	6
8	(Argentina) C. Jensen / (Spain) T. Icardo	6	7
14	(Italy) C. Orsi / (Spain) N. Rodriguez	0	6
9	(Spain) L. Rufo / (Spain) J. Castelló	2	1
3	(Spain) B. González / (Spain) C. Fernandéz	6	6
4	(Spain) A. Ustero / (Portugal) S. Araújo	7	7
10	(Spain) B. Caldera / (Spain) C. Goenaga	5	6
16	(Russia) K. Sharifova / (Spain) M. Talavan	4	4
6	(Spain) L. Sainz / (Spain) P. Llaguno	6	6
7	(Spain) A. Salazar / (Spain) V. Virseda	2	1
11	(Argentina) A. Osoro / (Spain) M. Calvo	6	6
13	(France) A. Collombon / (Spain) A. Martinez	2	3
2	(Argentina) D. Brea / (Spain) G. Triay	6	6

Quarter-Final
1	(Spain) A. Sánchez / (Spain) P. Josemaria	6	6
5	(Spain) A. Alonso / (Spain) M. Ortega	0	1
8	(Argentina) C. Jensen / (Spain) T. Icardo	0
3	(Spain) B. González / (Spain) C. Fernandéz	3	*
4	(Spain) A. Ustero / (Portugal) S. Araújo	7	6
10	(Spain) L. Sainz / (Spain) P. Llaguno	6	3
11	(Argentina) A. Osoro / (Spain) M. Calvo	4	2
2	(Argentina) D. Brea / (Spain) G. Triay	6	6

Semi-Finals
1	(Spain) A. Sánchez / (Spain) P. Josemaria	4	3
3	(Spain) B. González / (Spain) C. Fernandéz	6	6
4	(Spain) A. Ustero / (Portugal) S. Araújo	2	1
2	(Argentina) D. Brea / (Spain) G. Triay	6	6

Finals
3	(Spain) B. González / (Spain) C. Fernandéz	7	3	6
2	(Argentina) D. Brea / (Spain) G. Triay	6	6	2

== Results ==
=== Round of 32 ===
Men's

Date	Winners	Score	Opponent	Refs.
21/5/2025	(Argentina) Agustín Tapia (Spain) Arturo Coello	6–3 / 6–2	(Portugal) Miguel Deus (Portugal) Nuno Deus	
21/5/2025	(Spain) Enrique Goenaga (Spain) Luis Hernandez Quesada	3–6 / 7–5 / 7–6	(Spain) Andres Fernandez Lancha (Italy) Enzo Jensen	
21/5/2025	(Spain) Juanlu Esbri (Spain) Salvador Oria	3–6 / 7–5 / 6–3	(Spain) Javier Garrido (Argentina) Valentino Libaak	
20/5/2025	(Brazil) Lucas Bergamini (Spain) Paquito Navarro	7–6 / 6–3	(Italy) Aris Patiniotis (Spain) David Gala Sanchez	
20/5/2025	(Spain) Jon Sanz (Spain) Momo Gonzalez	4–6 / 6–2 / 6–3	(Argentina) Gonzalo Alfonso (Argentina) Leonel Aguirre	
21/5/2025	(Argentina) Leandro Augsburger (Spain) Pablo Cardona	6–3 / 6–7 / 6–4	(Spain) Guillermo Collado (Chile) Javier Valdes	
21/5/2025	(Argentina) Federico Mouriño (Spain) Pincho Fernandez	6–0 / 6–2	(Paraguay) Facundo Dehnike (Spain) Manuel Aragon	
21/5/2025	(Argentina) Franco Stupaczuk (Spain) Juan Lebrón	6–0 / 6–2	(Argentina) Agustin Gutiérrez (Spain) Jaime Muñoz	
21/5/2025	(Spain) Coki Nieto (Spain) Mike Yanguas	6–2 / 6–3	(Spain) Ignacio Sager (Brazil) Lucas Campagnolo	
20/5/2025	(Spain) Francisco Gil Morales (Spain) Victor Ruiz	6–2 / 6–4	(Spain) Ivan Ramirez (Spain) Mario Ortega	
21/5/2025	(Spain) Alex Arroyo (United Arab Emirates) Iñigo Jofre	6–4 / 6–1	(Spain) Jose Jimenez Casas (Spain) Teodoro Zapata	
21/5/2025	(Argentina) Juan Tello (Argentina) Martin Di Nenno	6–3 / 1–6 / 6–3	(Spain) Alvero Cepero (Argentina) Eduardo Agustin Torre	
20/5/2025	(Spain) Gonzalo Rubio (Spain) Javi Ruiz	6–2 / 6–4	(Spain) Eduardo Alonso (Spain) Jairo Bautista	
20/5/2025	(Argentina) Alex Chozas (Argentina) Sanyo Gutiérrez	6–4 / 4–6 / 6–3	(Argentina) Juan Cruz Belluati (Spain) Pablo Lijó	
20/5/2025	(Spain) Francisco Guerrero (Spain) Javier Leal	6–3 / 6–4	(Spain) Álex Ruiz (Argentina) Maxi Sánchez	
20/5/2025	(Spain) Alejandro Galán (Argentina) Federico Chingotto	6–3 / 6–3	(Paraguay) Martin Abud (Paraguay) Mariano Gonzalez	

Women's

Date	Winners	Score	Opponent	Refs.
21/5/2025	(Spain) Marina Guinart (Spain) Victoria Iglesias	6–4 / 6–4	(Spain) Marta Barrera (Spain) Marta Caparrós	
21/5/2025	(Spain) Carla Mesa (Spain) Sara Ruiz	6–0 / 6–1	(Argentina) Florencia Ernandorena (Colombia) Laura Arciniegas	
21/5/2025	(Italy) Carolina Orsi (Spain) Nuria Rodriguez	6–2 / 6–7 / 6–2	(Spain) Jana Montes (Spain) Marta Arellano	
21/5/2024	(Spain) Jessica Castelló (Spain) Lorena Rufo	6–4 / 6–4	(Spain) Agueda Perez (Spain) Melania Merino	
21/5/2024	(Spain) Beatriz Caldera (Spain) Carmen Goenaga	6–4 / 6–4	(Argentina) Julieta Bidahorria (Argentina) Martina Fassio Goyeneche	
21/5/2025	(Russia) Ksenia Sharifova (Spain) Marta Talavan	6–3 / 6–0	(Chile) Catalina Arancibia (Chile) Kimberley Ahumada	
21/5/2025	(Argentina) Aranzazu Osoro (Spain) Martina Calvo	6–4 / 6–7 / 6–2	(Spain) Marina Martinez Lobo (Spain) Sofía Saiz Vallejo	
21/5/2025	(France) Alix Collombon (Spain) Araceli Martinez	6–1 / 6–1	(Paraguay) Camila Acuña (Paraguay) Verónica Cepede	

=== Round of 16 ===
Men's

Date	Winners	Score	Opponent	Refs.
22/5/2025	(Argentina) Agustín Tapia (Spain) Arturo Coello	6–2 / 6–1	(Spain) Enrique Goenaga (Spain) Luis Hernandez Quesada	
22/5/2025	(Spain) Juanlu Esbri (Spain) Salvador Oria	6–4 / 7–6	(Brazil) Lucas Bergamini (Spain) Paquito Navarro	
22/5/2025	(Argentina) Leandro Augsburger (Spain) Pablo Cardona	7–6 / 6–4	(Spain) Jon Sanz (Spain) Momo Gonzalez	
22/5/2025	(Argentina) Franco Stupaczuk (Spain) Juan Lebrón	6–0 / 6–3	(Argentina) Federico Mouriño (Spain) Pincho Fernandez	
22/5/2025	(Spain) Francisco Gil Morales (Spain) Victor Ruiz	3–6 / 6–3 / 6–4	(Spain) Coki Nieto (Spain) Mike Yanguas	
22/5/2025	(Argentina) Juan Tello (Argentina) Martin Di Nenno	6–4 / 6–3	(Spain) Alex Arroyo (United Arab Emirates) Iñigo Jofre	
22/5/2025	(Argentina) Alex Chozas (Argentina) Sanyo Gutiérrez	1–6 / 6–3 / 6–1	(Spain) Gonzalo Rubio (Spain) Javi Ruiz	
22/5/2025	(Spain) Alejandro Galán (Argentina) Federico Chingotto	6–2 / 6–4	(Spain) Francisco Guerrero (Spain) Javier Leal	

Women's

Date	Winners	Score	Opponent	Refs.
22/5/2025	(Spain) Ariana Sánchez (Spain) Paula Josemaría	6–1 / 6–1	(Spain) Marina Guinart (Spain) Victoria Iglesias	
22/5/2025	(Spain) Alejandra Alonso (Spain) Marta Ortega	6–3 / 6–7 / 6–4	(Spain) Carla Mesa (Spain) Sara Ruiz	
22/5/2025	(Argentina) Claudia Jensen (Spain) Tamara Icardo	6–0 / 7–6	(Italy) Carolina Orsi (Spain) Nuria Rodriguez	
22/5/2025	(Spain) Bea González (Spain) Claudia Fernández	6–2 / 6–1	(Spain) Jessica Castelló (Spain) Lorena Rufo	
22/5/2025	(Spain) Andrea Ustero (Portugal) Sofia Araújo	7–5 / 7–6	(Spain) Beatriz Caldera (Spain) Carmen Goenaga	
22/5/2025	(Spain) Lucia Sainz (Spain) Patricia Llaguno	6–4 / 6–4	(Russia) Ksenia Sharifova (Spain) Marta Talavan	
22/5/2025	(Argentina) Aranzazu Osoro (Spain) Martina Calvo	6–2 / 6–1	(Spain) Alejandra Salazar (Spain) Verónica Virseda	
22/5/2025	(Argentina) Delfina Brea (Spain) Gemma Triay	6–2 / 6–3	(France) Alix Collombon (Spain) Araceli Martinez	

=== Quarter-Finals ===
Men's

Date	Winners	Score	Opponent	Refs.
23/5/2025	(Spain) Juanlu Esbri (Spain) Salvador Oria	6–3 / 2–6 / 7–6	(Argentina) Agustín Tapia (Spain) Arturo Coello	
23/5/2025	(Argentina) Leandro Augsburger (Spain) Pablo Cardona	6–3 / 5–7 / 6–2	(Argentina) Franco Stupaczuk (Spain) Juan Lebrón	
23/5/2025	(Argentina) Juan Tello (Argentina) Martin Di Nenno	6–1 / 1–1 / W.O.	(Spain) Francisco Gil Morales (Spain) Victor Ruiz	
23/5/2025	(Spain) Alejandro Galán (Argentina) Federico Chingotto	6–0 / 6–2	(Argentina) Alex Chozas (Argentina) Sanyo Gutiérrez	

Women's

Date	Winners	Score	Opponent	Refs.
23/5/2025	(Spain) Ariana Sánchez (Spain) Paula Josemaría	6–0 / 6–1	(Spain) Alejandra Alonso (Spain) Marta Ortega	
23/5/2025	(Spain) Bea González (Spain) Claudia Fernández	3–0 / W.O.	(Argentina) Claudia Jensen (Spain) Tamara Icardo	
23/5/2025	(Spain) Andrea Ustero (Portugal) Sofia Araújo	7–6 / 6–3	(Spain) Lucia Sainz (Spain) Patricia Llaguno	
23/5/2025	(Argentina) Delfina Brea (Spain) Gemma Triay	6–4 / 6–2	(Argentina) Aranzazu Osoro (Spain) Martina Calvo	

=== Semi-Finals ===
Men's

Date	Winners	Score	Opponent	Refs.
24/5/2025	(Argentina) Leandro Augsburger (Spain) Pablo Cardona	6–4 / 6–4	(Spain) Juanlu Esbri (Spain) Salvador Oria	
24/5/2025	(Spain) Alejandro Galán (Argentina) Federico Chingotto	6–2 / 6–3	(Argentina) Juan Tello (Argentina) Martin Di Nenno	

Women's

Date	Winners	Score	Opponent	Refs.
24/5/2025	(Spain) Bea González (Spain) Claudia Fernández	6–4 / 6–3	(Spain) Ariana Sánchez (Spain) Paula Josemaría	
24/5/2025	(Argentina) Delfina Brea (Spain) Gemma Triay	6–2 / 6–1	(Spain) Andrea Ustero (Portugal) Sofia Araújo	

=== Finals ===
Men's

Date	Winners	Score	Opponent	Refs.
25/5/2025	(Spain) Alejandro Galán (Argentina) Federico Chingotto	7–6 / 6–1	(Argentina) Leandro Augsburger (Spain) Pablo Cardona	

Women's

Date	Winners	Score	Opponent	Refs.
25/5/2025	(Spain) Bea González (Spain) Claudia Fernández	7–6 / 3–6 / 6–2	(Argentina) Delfina Brea (Spain) Gemma Triay	
