= 2025 Buenos Aires P1 =

Padel championships

- Date: 18 – 25 May
- Edition: 1st
- Category: P1
- Prize money: €474.500
- Location: Buenos Aires, Argentina
- Venue: Estadio Parque Roca

Champions
- Men's doubles: (Argentina) Agustín Tapia (Spain) Arturo Coello
- Women's doubles: (Spain) Ariana Sánchez (Spain) Paula Josemaría

Chronology

The 2025 Buenos Aires P1 (officially 2025 Premier Padel Buenos Aires P1) was the ninth tournament of the fourth season organized by Premier Padel, the premier padel circuit, promoted by the International Padel Federation, and with the financial backing of Nasser Al-Khelaïfi's Qatar Sports Investments.

In the women's category, the FIP's No. 1 and No. 3 pairs faced each other in the final for the second time, repeating the Riyadh final. Ariana Sánchez and Paula Josemaría defeated Bea González and Claudia Fernández, thereby claiming their third title of 2025.

In the men's category, for the second consecutive tournament in 2025, a pair ranked outside the top 3 reached the final. In the title match, world number ones Agustín Tapia and Arturo Coello defeated Lucas Bergamini and Paquito Navarro, securing their fourth title out of seven tournaments played.

== Relevant Data ==
=== New attendence record ===
During the semifinals at the Mary Terán de Weiss Stadium, the largest crowd ever seen at a padel match was recorded, with 16,156 people in the stands, surpassing the mark of 15,779 spectators set at the Palau Sant Jordi in Barcelona during the 2023 Master Final semifinals (still in World Padel Tour).

=== Paquito makes it to the finals ===
By reaching the final in Buenos Aires, Paquito Navarro ended a 532-day drought without playing in finals, a streak dating back to the 2023 World Padel Tour Master Final, which he won alongside Federico Chingotto.

=== Ariana and Paula reclaim the N.1 spot ===
With the defeat of Delfina Brea and Gemma Triay in the semifinals and the victory of Ariana Sánchez and Paula Josemaría in the finals, the Spanish pair reclaimed the top spot in the rankings, establishing a 1,200-point lead over Gemma.

== Seeds ==
Male

Rnk.	Team	FIP Ranking Points
1	(Argentina) Agustín Tapia (Spain) Arturo Coello	37100
2	(Spain) Alejandro Galán (Argentina) Federico Chingotto	27380
3	(Argentina) Franco Stupaczuk (Spain) Juan Lebrón	17065
4	(Spain) Coki Nieto (Spain) Mike Yanguas	14155
5	(Spain) Jon Sanz (Spain) Momo Gonzalez	10465
6	(Argentina) Juan Tello (Argentina) Martin Di Nenno	9650
7	(Brazil) Lucas Bergamini (Spain) Paquito Navarro	9015
8	(Spain) Eduardo Alonso (Spain) Jairo Bautista	6492
9	(Argentina) Leandro Augsburguer (Spain) Pablo Cardona	6177
10	(Spain) Javi Garrido (Argentina) Valentino Libaak	5778
11	(Spain) Alejandro Ruiz (Argentina) Maxi Sánchez	5089
12	(Spain) Francisco Guerrero (Spain) Javi Leal	4133
13	(Spain) Javier Barahona (Spain) Javier Garcia Mora	4080
14	(Spain) Alejandro Arroyo (United Arab Emirates) Inigo Jofre	4038
15	(Argentina) Alex Chozas (Argentina) Sanyo Gutiérrez	3919
16	(Argentina) Gonzalo Alfonso (Argentina) Leonel Aguirre	3328

Female

Rnk.	Team	FIP Ranking Points
1	(Spain) Ariana Sánchez (Spain) Paula Josemaria	33880
2	(Argentina) Delfina Brea (Spain) Gemma Triay	28500
3	(Spain) Bea González (Spain) Claudia Fernandéz	19830
4	(Spain) Andrea Ustero (Portugal) Sofia Araújo	13090
5	(Spain) Alejandra Alonso (Spain) Marta Ortega	12305
6	(Spain) Lucia Sainz (Spain) Patricia Llaguno	10870
7	(Spain) Alejandra Salazar (Spain) Veronica Virseda	10300
8	(Argentina) Claudia Jensen (Spain) Tamara Icardo	8120
9	(Spain) Jessica Castelló (Spain) Lorena Rufo	6945
10	(Spain) Beatriz Caldera (Spain) Carmen Goenaga	4834
11	(Argentina) Aranzazu Osoro (Spain) Martina Calvo	4787
12	(Spain) Marina Guinart (Spain) Victoria Iglesias	4471
13	(France) Alix Collombon (Spain) Araceli Martinez	3977
14	(Italy) Carolina Orsi (Spain) Nuria Rodriguez	3953
15	(Argentina) Lucia Martinez Gomez (Spain) Marta Marrero	3711
16	(Spain) Raquel Eugenio Barrera (Argentina) Virginia Riera	3684

== Head-to-head record between teams ranked in the top 4 during the season ==
=== Man's ===
Record	Coello–Tapia	Galán–Chingotto	Lebrón–Stupaczuk	Coki–Yanguas
Coello–Tapia	—	2–0	1–1	2–0
Galán–Chingotto	0–2	—	2–0	2–0
Lebrón–Stupaczuk	1–1	0–2	—	—
Coki–Yanguas	0–2	0–2	—	—

=== Women's ===
Record	Ariana–Paula	D. Brea–Triay	Gonzalez–Fernandez	Araújo–Ustero	Former Pairs	Araújo–Ortega
Ariana–Paula	—	1–3	5–1	1–0		1–1
D. Brea–Triay	3–1	—	1–3	1–0		3–0
Gonzalez–Fernandez	1–5	3–1	—	—		—
Araújo–Ustero	0–1	0–1	—	—		—
Former Pairs						
Araújo–Ortega	1–1	0–3	—	—		—

Because the Santiago final ended in a draw, it is not counted.

== Draws ==
=== Men's Bracket ===
Round of 32
1	(Spain) Coello / (Argentina) Tapia	6	6
19	(Spain) F. Gil / (Spain) V. Ruiz	4	1
24	(Spain) E. Goenaga / (Spain) L.H. Quesada	4	6
13	(Spain) J. Barahona / (Spain) J.G. Mora	6	7
15	(Argentina) A. Chozas / (Argentina) Sanyo	6	6
Q	(Italy) A. Caruso / (Argentina) L. Yob	4	3
22	(Portugal) M. Deus / (Portugal) N. Deus	6	4	3
8	(Spain) E. Alonso / (Spain) J. Bautista	3	6	6
5	(Spain) J. Sanz / (Spain) Momo	7	6
34	(Argentina) A. Gutiérrez / (Spain) J. Munoz	6	3
28	(Spain) J. Martinez / (Spain) M. Benitez	4	2
9	(Argentina) L. Augsburger / (Spain) P. Cardona	6	6
10	(Spain) J. Garrido / (Argentina) V. Libaak	2	6
25	(Argentina) J.C. Belluati / (Spain) P. Lijó	6	7
23	(Spain) A. Cepero / (Argentina) E. Torre	3	2
3	(Spain) J. Lebrón / (Argentina) Stupaczuk	6	6
4	(Spain) Coki / (Spain) Yanguas	6	6
29	(Spain) P. Alvarez / (Argentina) R. Valenzuela	2	3
21	(Spain) J.J. Casas / (Spain) T. Zapata	4	2
14	(Spain) A. Arroyo / (United Arab Emirates) I. Jofre	6	6
11	(Spain) A. Ruiz / (Argentina) Maxi	6	4	1
27	(Italy) A. Patiniotis / (Spain) D. Sanchez	4	6	6
Q	(Paraguay) M. Abud / (Paraguay) M. San Martin	2	3
7	(Brazil) L. Bergamini / (Spain) Paquito	6	6
6	(Argentina) J. Tello / (Argentina) Di Nenno	4	7	6
Q	(Spain) A.F. Lancha / (Italy) E. Jensen	6	5	3
Q	(Spain) J. Moya / (France) T. Leygue	6	4	6
12	(Spain) F. Guerrero / (Spain) J. Leal	3	6	7
16	(Argentina) G. Alfonso / (Argentina) L. Aguirre	2	2
17	(Spain) J.G. Diestro / (Spain) J. Esbri	6	6
18	(Spain) I. Sager / (Brazil) L. Campagnolo	3	1
2	(Spain) Galán / (Argentina) Chingotto	6	6

Round of 16
1	(Spain) Coello / (Argentina) Tapia	6	6
13	(Spain) J. Barahona / (Spain) J.G. Mora	1	4
15	(Argentina) A. Chozas / (Argentina) Sanyo	5	6
8	(Spain) E. Alonso / (Spain) J. Bautista	7	7
5	(Spain) J. Sanz / (Spain) Momo	6	6
9	(Argentina) L. Augsburger / (Spain) P. Cardona	1	4
25	(Argentina) J.C. Belluati / (Spain) P. Lijó	3	2
3	(Spain) J. Lebrón / (Argentina) Stupaczuk	6	6
4	(Spain) Coki / (Spain) Yanguas	7	2	4
14	(Spain) A. Arroyo / (United Arab Emirates) I. Jofre	6	6	6
27	(Italy) A. Patiniotis / (Spain) D. Sanchez	3	1
7	(Brazil) L. Bergamini / (Spain) Paquito	6	6
6	(Argentina) J. Tello / (Argentina) Di Nenno	6	6
12	(Spain) F. Guerrero / (Spain) J. Leal	4	2
17	(Spain) J.G. Diestro / (Spain) J. Esbri	2	1
2	(Spain) Galán / (Argentina) Chingotto	6	6

Quarter-Final
1	(Spain) Coello / (Argentina) Tapia	4	6	6
8	(Spain) E. Alonso / (Spain) J. Bautista	6	3	2
5	(Spain) J. Sanz / (Spain) Momo	6	3	7
3	(Spain) J. Lebrón / (Argentina) Stupaczuk	3	6	6
14	(Spain) A. Arroyo / (United Arab Emirates) I. Jofre	4	6
7	(Brazil) L. Bergamini / (Spain) Paquito	6	7
6	(Argentina) J. Tello / (Argentina) Di Nenno	2	3
2	(Spain) Galán / (Argentina) Chingotto	6	6

Semi-Finals
1	(Spain) Coello / (Argentina) Tapia	6	6
5	(Spain) J. Sanz / (Spain) Momo	4	4
7	(Brazil) L. Bergamini / (Spain) Paquito	4	6	1
2	(Spain) Galán / (Argentina) Chingotto	6	4	0

Finals
1	(Spain) Coello / (Argentina) Tapia	6	6
7	(Brazil) L. Bergamini / (Spain) Paquito	2	2

=== Women's Bracket ===
Round of 32
1	(Spain) A. Sánchez / (Spain) P. Josemaria
Bye
14	(Italy) C. Orsi / (Spain) N. Rodriguez	5	7	6
Q	(Spain) M. Lobo / (Spain) S. Saiz	7	6	4
21	(Argentina) J. Bidahorria / (Spain) L. Arruabarrena	6	5	4
19	(Spain) J. Velasco / (Spain) N. Canovas	1	7	6
WC	(Argentina) D. Banchero / (Argentina) I. Jimenez	1	1
6	(Spain) L. Sainz / (Spain) P. Llaguno	6	6
5	(Spain) A. Alonso / (Spain) M. Ortega	7	1	3
11	(Argentina) A. Osoro / (Spain) M. Calvo	5	6	6
Q	(Portugal) A. Nogueira / (Argentina) M. Goyeneche	6	6
23	(Spain) B. Las Heras / (Italy) G. Marchetti	4	4
18	(Spain) C. Mesa / (Spain) S. Ruiz	6	6
Q	(Italy) M. Montesi / (Argentina) M. Ferreyra	0	2
Bye
4	(Spain) A. Ustero / (Portugal) S. Araújo
3	(Spain) B. González / (Spain) C. Fernandéz
Bye
20	(Spain) M. Barrera / (Spain) M. Caparrós	1	6	6
17	(Russia) K. Sharifova / (Spain) M. Talavan	6	4	4
16	(Spain) R. Barrera / (Argentina) V. Riera	6	3	7
9	(Spain) L. Rufo / (Spain) J. Castelló	4	6	5
10	(Spain) B. Caldera / (Spain) C. Goenaga	6	6
7	(Spain) A. Salazar / (Spain) V. Virseda	4	3
8	(Argentina) C. Jensen / (Spain) T. Icardo	6	6
Q	(Spain) A. Perez / (Spain) M. Borrero	0	1
15	(Spain) L. Martinez / (Spain) M. Marrero	6	6
22	(Spain) M.R. Abajo / (Spain) S. Bellver	3	3
12	(Spain) M. Guinart / (Spain) V. Iglesias	6	4	3
13	(France) A. Collombon / (Spain) A. Martinez	0	6	6
Bye
2	(Argentina) D. Brea / (Spain) G. Triay

Round of 16
1	(Spain) A. Sánchez / (Spain) P. Josemaria	6	6
14	(Italy) C. Orsi / (Spain) N. Rodriguez	2	3
19	(Spain) J. Velasco / (Spain) N. Canovas	2	0
6	(Spain) L. Sainz / (Spain) P. Llaguno	6	6
5	(Spain) A. Alonso / (Spain) M. Ortega	6	6
Q	(Portugal) A. Nogueira / (Argentina) M. Goyeneche	3	0
18	(Spain) C. Mesa / (Spain) S. Ruiz	6	4
4	(Spain) A. Ustero / (Portugal) S. Araújo	7	6
3	(Spain) B. González / (Spain) C. Fernandéz	6	6
20	(Spain) M. Barrera / (Spain) M. Caparrós	1	1
16	(Spain) R. Barrera / (Argentina) V. Riera	1	1
10	(Spain) B. Caldera / (Spain) C. Goenaga	6	6
8	(Argentina) C. Jensen / (Spain) T. Icardo	6	6
15	(Spain) L. Martinez / (Spain) M. Marrero	3	1
13	(France) A. Collombon / (Spain) A. Martinez	1	1
2	(Argentina) D. Brea / (Spain) G. Triay	6	6

Quarter-Final
1	(Spain) A. Sánchez / (Spain) P. Josemaria	7	6
6	(Spain) L. Sainz / (Spain) P. Llaguno	5	1
5	(Spain) A. Alonso / (Spain) M. Ortega	2	6	6
4	(Spain) A. Ustero / (Portugal) S. Araújo	6	3	4
3	(Spain) B. González / (Spain) C. Fernandéz	7	1	6
10	(Spain) B. Caldera / (Spain) C. Goenaga	5	6	1
8	(Argentina) C. Jensen / (Spain) T. Icardo	2	1
2	(Argentina) D. Brea / (Spain) G. Triay	6	6

Semi-Finals
1	(Spain) A. Sánchez / (Spain) P. Josemaria	6	6
4	(Spain) A. Ustero / (Portugal) S. Araújo	2	4
3	(Spain) B. González / (Spain) C. Fernandéz	6	6
2	(Argentina) D. Brea / (Spain) G. Triay	4	3

Finals
1	(Spain) A. Sánchez / (Spain) P. Josemaria	6	6
3	(Spain) B. González / (Spain) C. Fernandéz	2	2

== Results ==
=== First Round ===
Men's

Date	Winners	Score	Opponent	Refs.
27/5/2025	(Spain) Francisco Gil Morales (Spain) Victor Ruiz	6–3 / 6–4	(Argentina) Cristian German Gutiérrez (Italy) Facundo Lopez	
27/5/2025	(Spain) Enrique Goenaga (Spain) Luis Hernandez Quesada	7–6 / 6–2	(Spain) Diego Gil Batista (Spain) Rafael Mendéz	
27/5/2025	(Italy) Alvaro Montiel Caruso (Argentina) Leonardo Yob	7–5 / 6–2	(Argentina) Federico Fleitas (Argentina) Juan Pablo Dametto	
27/5/2025	(Portugal) Miguel Deus (Portugal) Nuno Deus	7–6 / 6–7 / 6–4	(Spain) Daniel Luna Peinado (Spain) Santiago Pineda	
27/5/2025	(Argentina) Agustin Gutiérrez (Spain) Jaime Muñoz	7–5 / 6–7 / 6–4	(Argentina) Kevin Kviatkovski (Argentina) Renzo Nuñez	
27/5/2025	(Spain) Javier Martinez Vazques (Spain) Miguel Benitez	7–6 / 6–1	(Spain) Francisco Cabeza (Argentina) Ramiro Moyano	
27/5/2025	(Argentina) Juan Cruz Belluati (Spain) Pablo Lijó	7–5 / 6–7 / 6–4	(Spain) Daniel Santigosa (Spain) Emilio Sánchez Chamero	
27/5/2025	(Spain) Alvero Cepero (Argentina) Eduardo Agustin Torre	6–4 / 3–6 / 6–3	(Spain) Alvaro Melendez Amaya (Italy) Facundo Dominguez	
27/5/2025	(Spain) Pol Hernandez (Argentina) Ramiro Valenzuela	6–3 / 6–3	(Argentina) Matías Gonzalez (Argentina) Tomás Luco	
27/5/2025	(Spain) Jose Jimenez Casas (Spain) Teodoro Zapata	4–6 / 6–3 / 7–5	(Argentina) Federico Mouriño (Spain) Pincho Fernandez	
27/5/2025	(Italy) Aris Patiniotis (Spain) David Gala Sanchez	6–1 / 3–6 / 6–0	(Spain) Anton Sans Riola (Spain) Marc Quilez	
27/5/2025	(Paraguay) Martin Abud (Paraguay) Mariano Gonzalez	7–5 / 7–5	(Argentina) Antonio Graupera (Argentina) Naim Díaz	
27/5/2025	(Spain) Andres Fernandez Lancha (Italy) Enzo Jensen	7–6 / 6–3	(Argentina) Ignacio Piotto (Spain) Mario Del Castillo	
27/5/2025	(Spain) Jesus Moya (France) Thomas Leygue	7–5 / 7–6	(Argentina) Juan Ignacio Rubini (Argentina) Miguel Lamperti	
27/5/2025	(Spain) Jose García Diestro (Spain) Juanlu Esbri	6–3 / 1–1 / W.O.	(Spain) Gonzalo Rubio (Spain) Javi Ruiz	
27/5/2025	(Spain) Ignacio Sager (Brazil) Lucas Campagnolo	7–5 / 3–6 / 6–3	(Spain) Guillermo Collado (Chile) Javier Valdes	

=== Round of 32 ===
Men's

Date	Winners	Score	Opponent	Refs.
28/5/2025	(Argentina) Agustín Tapia (Spain) Arturo Coello	6–4 / 6–1	(Spain) Francisco Gil Morales (Spain) Victor Ruiz	
28/5/2025	(Spain) Javier Barahona (Spain) Javier García Mora	6–4 / 7–6	(Spain) Enrique Goenaga (Spain) Luis Hernandez Quesada	
28/5/2025	(Argentina) Alex Chozas (Argentina) Sanyo Gutiérrez	6–4 / 6–3	(Italy) Alvaro Montiel Caruso (Argentina) Leonardo Yob	
28/5/2025	(Spain) Eduardo Alonso (Spain) Jairo Bautista	3–6 / 6–4 / 6–3	(Portugal) Miguel Deus (Portugal) Nuno Deus	
28/5/2025	(Spain) Jon Sanz (Spain) Momo Gonzalez	7–6 / 6–3	(Argentina) Agustin Gutiérrez (Spain) Jaime Muñoz	
28/5/2025	(Argentina) Leandro Augsburger (Spain) Pablo Cardona	6–4 / 6–2	(Spain) Javier Martinez Vazques (Spain) Miguel Benitez	
28/5/2025	(Argentina) Juan Cruz Belluati (Spain) Pablo Lijó	6–2 / 7–6	(Spain) Javier Garrido (Argentina) Valentino Libaak	
28/5/2025	(Argentina) Franco Stupaczuk (Spain) Juan Lebrón	6–3 / 6–2	(Spain) Alvero Cepero (Argentina) Eduardo Agustin Torre	
28/5/2025	(Spain) Coki Nieto (Spain) Mike Yanguas	6–2 / 6–3	(Spain) Pol Hernandez (Argentina) Ramiro Valenzuela	
28/5/2025	(Spain) Alex Arroyo (United Arab Emirates) Iñigo Jofre	6–4 / 6–2	(Spain) Jose Jimenez Casas (Spain) Teodoro Zapata	
28/5/2025	(Italy) Aris Patiniotis (Spain) David Gala Sanchez	4–6 / 6–1 / 6–4	(Spain) Aléx Ruiz (Argentina) Maxi Sánchez	
28/5/2025	(Brazil) Lucas Bergamini (Spain) Paquito Navarro	6–2 / 6–3	(Paraguay) Martin Abud (Paraguay) Mariano Gonzalez	
28/5/2025	(Argentina) Juan Tello (Argentina) Martin Di Nenno	4–6 / 7–5 / 6–3	(Spain) Andres Fernandez Lancha (Italy) Enzo Jensen	
28/5/2025	(Spain) Francisco Guerrero (Spain) Javier Leal	3–6 / 6–4 / 7–6	(Spain) Jesus Moya (France) Thomas Leygue	
28/5/2025	(Spain) Jose García Diestro (Spain) Juanlu Esbri	6–2 / 6–2	(Argentina) Gonzalo Alfonso (Argentina) Leonel Aguirre	
28/5/2025	(Spain) Alejandro Galán (Argentina) Federico Chingotto	6–3 / 6–1	(Spain) Ignacio Sager (Brazil) Lucas Campagnolo	

Women's

Date	Winners	Score	Opponent	Refs.
28/5/2025	(Italy) Carolina Orsi (Spain) Nuria Rodriguez	5–7 / 7–6 / 6–4	(Spain) Marina Martinez Lobo (Spain) Sofía Saiz Vallejo	
28/5/2025	(Spain) Jimena Velasco (Spain) Noa Canovas	1–6 / 7–5 / 6–4	(Argentina) Julieta Bidahorria (Spain) Lara Arruabarrena	
27/5/2025	(Spain) Lucia Sainz (Spain) Patricia Llaguno	6–1 / 6–1	(Argentina) Daniela Banchero (Argentina) Irene Jimenez	
28/5/2025	(Argentina) Aranzazu Osoro (Spain) Martina Calvo	5–7 / 6–1 / 6–3	(Spain) Alejandra Alonso (Spain) Marta Ortega	
28/5/2025	(Portugal) Ana Catarina Nogueira (Argentina) Martina Fassio Goyeneche	6–4 / 6–4	(Spain) Barbara Las Heras (Italy) Giorgia Marchetti	
28/5/2025	(Spain) Carla Mesa (Spain) Sara Ruiz	6–0 / 6–2	(Argentina) María Laura Ferreyra (Argentina) Marianela Montesi	
27/5/2025	(Spain) Marta Barrera (Spain) Marta Caparrós	1–6 / 6–4 / 6–4	(Russia) Ksenia Sharifova (Spain) Marta Talavan	
28/5/2025	(Spain) Raquel Eugenio Barrera (Argentina) Virginia Riera	6–4 / 3–6 / 7–5	(Spain) Jessica Castelló (Spain) Lorena Rufo	
28/5/2025	(Spain) Beatriz Caldera (Spain) Carmen Goenaga	6–4 / 6–3	(Spain) Alejandra Salazar (Spain) Verónica Virseda	
28/5/2025	(Argentina) Claudia Jensen (Spain) Tamara Icardo	6–0 / 6–1	(Spain) Agueda Perez (Spain) Marta Borrero	
28/5/2025	(Spain) Lucia Martinez Gomez (Spain) Marta Marrero	6–3 / 6–3	(Spain) Laia Rodriguez Abajo (Spain) Sandra Bellver	
27/5/2025	(France) Alix Collombon (Spain) Araceli Martinez	0–6 / 6–3 / 6–4	(Spain) Marina Guinart (Spain) Victoria Iglesias	

=== Round of 16 ===
Men's

Date	Winners	Score	Opponent	Refs.
29/5/2025	(Argentina) Agustín Tapia (Spain) Arturo Coello	6–1 / 6–4	(Spain) Javier Barahona (Spain) Javier García Mora	
29/5/2025	(Spain) Eduardo Alonso (Spain) Jairo Bautista	7–5 / 7–6	(Argentina) Alex Chozas (Argentina) Sanyo Gutiérrez	
29/5/2025	(Spain) Jon Sanz (Spain) Momo Gonzalez	6–1 / 6–4	(Argentina) Leandro Augsburger (Spain) Pablo Cardona	
29/5/2025	(Argentina) Franco Stupaczuk (Spain) Juan Lebrón	6–3 / 6–2	(Argentina) Juan Cruz Belluati (Spain) Pablo Lijó	
29/5/2025	(Spain) Alex Arroyo (United Arab Emirates) Iñigo Jofre	6–7 / 6–2 / 6–4	(Spain) Coki Nieto (Spain) Mike Yanguas	
29/5/2025	(Brazil) Lucas Bergamini (Spain) Paquito Navarro	6–3 / 6–1	(Italy) Aris Patiniotis (Spain) David Gala Sanchez	
29/5/2025	(Argentina) Juan Tello (Argentina) Martin Di Nenno	6–4 / 6–2	(Spain) Francisco Guerrero (Spain) Javier Leal	
29/5/2025	(Spain) Alejandro Galán (Argentina) Federico Chingotto	6–2 / 6–1	(Spain) Jose García Diestro (Spain) Juanlu Esbri	

Women's

Date	Winners	Score	Opponent	Refs.
29/5/2025	(Spain) Ariana Sánchez (Spain) Paula Josemaría	6–2 / 6–3	(Italy) Carolina Orsi (Spain) Nuria Rodriguez	
29/5/2025	(Spain) Lucia Sainz (Spain) Patricia Llaguno	6–2 / 6–0	(Spain) Jimena Velasco (Spain) Noa Canovas	
29/5/2025	(Argentina) Aranzazu Osoro (Spain) Martina Calvo	6–3 / 6–0	(Portugal) Ana Catarina Nogueira (Argentina) Martina Fassio Goyeneche	
29/5/2025	(Spain) Andrea Ustero (Portugal) Sofia Araújo	7–6 / 6–4	(Spain) Carla Mesa (Spain) Sara Ruiz	
29/5/2025	(Spain) Bea González (Spain) Claudia Fernández	6–1 / 6–1	(Spain) Marta Barrera (Spain) Marta Caparrós	
29/5/2025	(Spain) Beatriz Caldera (Spain) Carmen Goenaga	6–1 / 6–1	(Spain) Raquel Eugenio Barrera (Argentina) Virginia Riera	
29/5/2025	(Argentina) Claudia Jensen (Spain) Tamara Icardo	6–3 / 6–1	(Spain) Lucia Martinez Gomez (Spain) Marta Marrero	
29/5/2025	(Argentina) Delfina Brea (Spain) Gemma Triay	6–1 / 6–1	(France) Alix Collombon (Spain) Araceli Martinez	

=== Quarter-Finals ===
Men's

Date	Winners	Score	Opponent	Refs.
30/5/2025	(Argentina) Agustín Tapia (Spain) Arturo Coello	4–6 / 6–3 / 6–2	(Spain) Eduardo Alonso (Spain) Jairo Bautista	
30/5/2025	(Spain) Jon Sanz (Spain) Momo Gonzalez	6–3 / 3–6 / 7–6	(Argentina) Franco Stupaczuk (Spain) Juan Lebrón	
30/5/2025	(Brazil) Lucas Bergamini (Spain) Paquito Navarro	6–4 / 7–6	(Spain) Alex Arroyo (United Arab Emirates) Iñigo Jofre	
30/5/2025	(Spain) Alejandro Galán (Argentina) Federico Chingotto	6–2 / 6–3	(Argentina) Juan Tello (Argentina) Martin Di Nenno	

Women's

Date	Winners	Score	Opponent	Refs.
30/5/2025	(Spain) Ariana Sánchez (Spain) Paula Josemaría	7–5 / 6–1	(Spain) Lucia Sainz (Spain) Patricia Llaguno	
30/5/2025	(Argentina) Aranzazu Osoro (Spain) Martina Calvo	2–6 / 6–3 / 6–4	(Spain) Andrea Ustero (Portugal) Sofia Araújo	
30/5/2025	(Spain) Bea González (Spain) Claudia Fernández	7–5 / 1–6 / 6–1	(Spain) Beatriz Caldera (Spain) Carmen Goenaga	
30/5/2025	(Argentina) Delfina Brea (Spain) Gemma Triay	6–2 / 6–1	(Argentina) Claudia Jensen (Spain) Tamara Icardo	

=== Semi-Finals ===
Men's

Date	Winners	Score	Opponent	Refs.
31/5/2025	(Argentina) Agustín Tapia (Spain) Arturo Coello	6–4 / 6–4	(Spain) Jon Sanz (Spain) Momo Gonzalez	
31/5/2025	(Brazil) Lucas Bergamini (Spain) Paquito Navarro	4–6 / 6–4 / 1–0 / W.O.	(Spain) Alejandro Galán (Argentina) Federico Chingotto	

Women's

Date	Winners	Score	Opponent	Refs.
31/5/2025	(Spain) Ariana Sánchez (Spain) Paula Josemaría	6–2 / 6–4	(Argentina) Aranzazu Osoro (Spain) Martina Calvo	
31/5/2025	(Spain) Bea González (Spain) Claudia Fernández	6–4 / 6–3	(Argentina) Delfina Brea (Spain) Gemma Triay	

=== Finals ===
Men's

Date	Winners	Score	Opponent	Refs.
1/6/2025	(Argentina) Agustín Tapia (Spain) Arturo Coello	6–2 / 6–2	(Brazil) Lucas Bergamini (Spain) Paquito Navarro	

Women's

Date	Winners	Score	Opponent	Refs.
1/6/2025	(Spain) Ariana Sánchez (Spain) Paula Josemaría	6–2 / 6–2	(Spain) Bea González (Spain) Claudia Fernández	
