= 2026 Brussels P2 =

Premier Padel tournament held in Brussels

- Date: 19 – 26 April
- Edition: 3rd
- Category: P2
- Prize money: €264.534
- Location: Brussels, Belgium
- Venue: Tour & Taxis Gare Maritime
- Court speed: Fast

Champions
- Men's doubles: (Spain) Juan Lebrón (Argentina) Leandro Augsburger
- Women's doubles: (Spain) Bea González (Spain) Paula Josemaría

Chronology

The 2026 Brussels P2 (officially 2026 Premier Padel Lotto Brussels P2) was the sixth tournament of the fifth season organized by Premier Padel, the premier padel circuit, promoted by the International Padel Federation, and with the financial backing of Nasser Al-Khelaïfi's Qatar Sports Investments.

In the women's category, the two highest-ranked pairs on the FIP rankings both reached the final for the fourth time in 2026. In the decisive match, Bea González and Paula Josemaría defeated Delfina Brea and Gemma Triay for the third consecutive tournament finals, to claim their third title of the season.

In the men's category, Juan Lebrón and Leandro Augsburger reached the finals for the second time this season, where they were set to face the world's number one pair. In the final match, Augsburger and Lebrón defeated Agustín Tapia and Arturo Coello, avenging their loss in the Cancún P2 finals, securing their first title of 2026 and their first as a team.

== Relevant Data ==
=== Consecutive finals and Bea's streak ===
With their semifinal victory, Delfina Brea and Gemma Triay, the leaders of the women's world rankings, reached their tenth consecutive final across the last ten tournaments played between 2025 and 2026. However, it was Bea González who ultimately came out on top, winning eight of the last nine finals played against the Brea-Triay pair.

=== Juan Lebrón wins again after 785 days ===
By claiming the title in Brussels, Juan Lebrón ended a 785-day drought without winning a tournament featuring the world's top pairs. His last victory, still alongside Alejandro Galán, had been at the Riyadh P1 in February 2024.

Lebrón had also won the Finland P2 in August 2024 (with Martin Di Nenno) and the Cancún P2 in March 2025 (with Franco Stupaczuk), but neither of those events featured the world's top two pairs.

== Seeds ==
Male

Rnk.	Team	FIP Ranking Points
1	(Argentina) Agustín Tapia (Spain) Arturo Coello	41820
2	(Spain) Alejandro Galán (Argentina) Federico Chingotto	34680
3	(Argentina) Franco Stupaczuk (Spain) Mike Yanguas	12345
4	(Spain) Juan Lebrón (Argentina) Leandro Augsburguer	12220
5	(Spain) Francisco Guerrero (Spain) Paquito Navarro	11320
6	(Spain) Coki Nieto (Spain) Jon Sanz	10704
7	(Argentina) Martín Di Nenno (Spain) Momo González	9400
8	(Brazil) Lucas Bergamini (Spain) Javi Garrido	7245
9	(Spain) Javi Leal (Spain) Pablo Cardona	5555
10	(Spain) Alejandro Ruiz (Spain) Juanlu Esbri	5025
11	(Spain) Jairo Bautista (Brazil) Lucas Campagnolo	4622
12	(Spain) Alejandro Arroyo (Argentina) Leonel Aguirre	4615
13	(Argentina) Gonzalo Alfonso (Spain) Javier Barahona	4354
14	(Argentina) Juan Tello (Spain) Maximiliano Arce	4267
15	(Spain) Aimar Goñi (Spain) Eduardo Alonso	4202
16	(Spain) Javier Garcia Mora (Spain) Jose Jimenez Casas	4110

Female

Rnk.	Team	FIP Ranking Points
1	(Argentina) Delfina Brea (Spain) Gemma Triay	34600
2	(Spain) Bea González (Spain) Paula Josemaria	27230
3	(Spain) Ariana Sánchez (Spain) Andrea Ustero	21325
4	(Spain) Claudia Fernandéz (Portugal) Sofia Araújo	19155
5	(Argentina) Claudia Jensen (Spain) Tamara Icardo	11775
6	(Spain) Marta Ortega (Spain) Martina Calvo	10765
7	(Spain) Alejandra Alonso (Spain) Alejandra Salazar	10000
8	(Spain) Marina Guinart (Spain) Veronica Virseda	8315
9	(Spain) Beatriz Caldera (Spain) Carmen Goenaga	7340
10	(Argentina) Aranzazu Osoro (Spain) Victoria Iglesias	7030
11	(Argentina) Martina Fassio Goyeneche (Spain) Raquel Eugenio Barrera	5015
12	(Italy) Carolina Orsi (Spain) Patricia Llaguno	4785
13	(Spain) Araceli Martinez (Spain) Lucía Sainz	4757
14	(Spain) Jessica Castelló (Spain) Lorena Rufo	4420
15	(Spain) Jimena Velasco (Spain) Marta Barrera	4165
16	(Argentina) Julieta Bidahorria (Spain) Marta Caparros	3280

== Head-to-head record between teams ranked in the top 4 during the season ==
=== Man's ===
Record	Coello–Tapia	Galán–Chingotto	Stupaczuk–Yanguas	Augsburger–Lebrón
Coello–Tapia	—	1–2	2–0	3–1
Galán–Chingotto	2–1	—	2–0	0–1
Stupaczuk–Yanguas	0–2	0–2	—	—
Augsburger–Lebrón	1–3	1–0	—	—

=== Women's ===
Record	D. Brea–Triay	B. González–Paula	Ariana–Ustero	Araúijo–C. Fernandez
D. Brea–Triay	—	1–3	1–1	2–0
B. González–Paula	3–1	—	2–2	1–0
Ariana–Ustero	1–1	2–2	—	—
Araúijo–C. Fernandez	0–2	0–1	—	—

== Draws ==
=== Men's Bracket ===
Round of 32
1	(Spain) Coello / (Argentina) Tapia
Bye
Q	(Spain) I. Sager / (Argentina) J.C. Belluati	6	1
12	(Spain) A. Arroyo / (Argentina) L. Aguirre	7	6
21	(Spain) J.G. Diestro / (Argentina) M. Blasco	6	3	6
17	(Spain) D. Sánchez / (United Arab Emirates) I. Jofre	2	6	4
19	(Argentina) A. Chozas / (Argentina) V. Libaak	6	3
6	(Spain) Coki / (Spain) J. Sanz	7	6
7	(Argentina) Di Nenno / (Spain) Momo	6	6
22	(Spain) P.G. Rodrigo / (Spain) P. Lijó	3	2
9	(Spain) J. Leal / (Spain) P. Cardona	6	2
11	(Spain) J. Bautista / (Brazil) L. Campagnolo	7	6
WC	(Belgium) C. Geens / (France) D. Guichard	6	7
WC	(Belgium) I. Huysveld / (Argentina) M. Lamperti	3	6
Bye
3	(Argentina) Stupaczuk / (Spain) Yanguas
4	(Spain) Lebrón / (Argentina) L. Augsburger
Bye
20	(Spain) G. Collado / (Spain) P.H. Alvarez	6	6
18	(Argentina) Sanyo / (Spain) V. Ruiz	4	4
15	(Spain) A. Goñi / (Spain) E. Alonso	6	6
Q	(Spain) D. Santigosa / (Spain) M. Sintes	3	3
Q	(Spain) J. Marmolejo / (Argentina) R. Pereyra	3	3
8	(Spain) J. Garrido / (Brazil) L. Bergamini	6	6
5	(Spain) F. Guerrero / (Spain) Paquito	4	7	6
14	(Argentina) J. Tello / (Argentina) M. Arce	6	6	3
13	(Argentina) G. Alfonso / (Spain) J. Barahona	5	4
Q	(Argentina) A. Gutiérrez / (Spain) S. Oria	7	6
10	(Spain) A. Ruiz / (Spain) J. Esbri	6	6
16	(Spain) J.G. Mora / (Spain) J.J. Casas	4	4
Bye
2	(Argentina) Chingotto / (Spain) Galán

Round of 16
1	(Spain) Coello / (Argentina) Tapia	6	7
12	(Spain) A. Arroyo / (Argentina) L. Aguirre	1	6
21	(Spain) J.G. Diestro / (Argentina) M. Blasco	4	5
6	(Spain) Coki / (Spain) J. Sanz	6	7
7	(Argentina) Di Nenno / (Spain) Momo	5	4
11	(Spain) J. Bautista / (Brazil) L. Campagnolo	7	6
WC	(Belgium) C. Geens / (France) D. Guichard	3	3
3	(Argentina) Stupaczuk / (Spain) Yanguas	6	6
4	(Spain) Lebrón / (Argentina) L. Augsburger	6	7
20	(Spain) G. Collado / (Spain) P.H. Alvarez	2	6
15	(Spain) A. Goñi / (Spain) E. Alonso	4	6	6
8	(Spain) J. Garrido / (Brazil) L. Bergamini	6	2	3
5	(Spain) F. Guerrero / (Spain) Paquito	6	7
Q	(Argentina) A. Gutiérrez / (Spain) S. Oria	3	6
10	(Spain) A. Ruiz / (Spain) J. Esbri	6	1
2	(Argentina) Chingotto / (Spain) Galán	7	6

Quarter-Final
1	(Spain) Coello / (Argentina) Tapia	7	5	6
6	(Spain) Coki / (Spain) J. Sanz	6	7	3
11	(Spain) J. Bautista / (Brazil) L. Campagnolo	1	2
3	(Argentina) Stupaczuk / (Spain) Yanguas	6	6
4	(Spain) Lebrón / (Argentina) L. Augsburger	7	6
15	(Spain) A. Goñi / (Spain) E. Alonso	5	4
5	(Spain) F. Guerrero / (Spain) Paquito	1	0
2	(Argentina) Chingotto / (Spain) Galán	6	6

Semi-Finals
1	(Spain) Coello / (Argentina) Tapia	7	6
3	(Argentina) Stupaczuk / (Spain) Yanguas	5	2
4	(Spain) Lebrón / (Argentina) L. Augsburger	6	6
2	(Argentina) Chingotto / (Spain) Galán	4	4

Finals
1	(Spain) Coello / (Argentina) Tapia	6	3	3
4	(Spain) Lebrón / (Argentina) L. Augsburger	2	6	6

=== Women's Bracket ===
Round of 32
1	(Argentina) D. Brea / (Spain) G. Triay
Bye
11	(Spain) J. Velasco / (Spain) M. Barrera	6	6
WC	(Belgium) E. Boeykens / (Belgium) J. Pysson	1	2
Q	(Italy) G. Dal Pozzo / (Spain) N. Rodriguez	3	6	6
16	(Argentina) J. Bidahorria / (Spain) M. Caparros	6	4	1
Bye
7	(Spain) A. Salazar / (Spain) A. Alonso
5	(Argentina) C. Jensen / (Spain) T. Icardo
Bye
10	(Argentina) A. Osoro / (Spain) V. Iglesias	6	6
Q	(France) C. Touly / (Italy) M. Parmigiani	1	0
9	(Spain) B. Caldera / (Spain) C. Goenaga	7	6
Q	(Spain) M. Talavan / (Spain) S. Saiz	5	4
Bye
3	(Spain) A. Ustero / (Spain) A. Sánchez
4	(Spain) C. Fernández / (Portugal) S. Araújo
Bye
11	(Argentina) M. Goyeneche / (Spain) R. Barrera	3	6	6
18	(Spain) A. Perez / (Spain) L. Martinez	6	0	0
13	(Spain) A. Martinez / (Spain) L. Sainz	6	3
14	(Spain) J. Castelló / (Spain) L. Rufo	7	6
Bye
8	(Spain) M. Guinart / (Spain) V. Virseda
6	(Spain) M. Ortega / (Spain) M. Calvo
Bye
Q	(Spain) L. Manquillo / (Spain) N. Aguilar	6	6
17	(Russia) K. Sharifova / (Spain) M. Borrero	2	1
19	(Spain) T. Navarro / (Argentina) V. Riera	4	1
12	(Italy) C. Orsi / (Spain) P. Llaguno	6	6
Bye
2	(Spain) B. González / (Spain) P. Josemaria

Round of 16
1	(Argentina) D. Brea / (Spain) G. Triay	6	6
11	(Spain) J. Velasco / (Spain) M. Barrera	1	2
Q	(Italy) G. Dal Pozzo / (Spain) N. Rodriguez	6	2
7	(Spain) A. Salazar / (Spain) A. Alonso	7	6
5	(Argentina) C. Jensen / (Spain) T. Icardo	6	6
10	(Argentina) A. Osoro / (Spain) V. Iglesias	2	0
9	(Spain) B. Caldera / (Spain) C. Goenaga	0	3
3	(Spain) A. Ustero / (Spain) A. Sánchez	6	6
4	(Spain) C. Fernández / (Portugal) S. Araújo	6	6
11	(Argentina) M. Goyeneche / (Spain) R. Barrera	4	3
14	(Spain) J. Castelló / (Spain) L. Rufo	6	6
8	(Spain) M. Guinart / (Spain) V. Virseda	3	2
6	(Spain) M. Ortega / (Spain) M. Calvo	6	6
Q	(Spain) L. Manquillo / (Spain) N. Aguilar	2	0
12	(Italy) C. Orsi / (Spain) P. Llaguno	1	1
2	(Spain) B. González / (Spain) P. Josemaria	6	6

Quarter-Final
1	(Argentina) D. Brea / (Spain) G. Triay	6	6
7	(Spain) A. Salazar / (Spain) A. Alonso	3	1
5	(Argentina) C. Jensen / (Spain) T. Icardo	6	6
3	(Spain) A. Ustero / (Spain) A. Sánchez	4	2
4	(Spain) C. Fernández / (Portugal) S. Araújo	6	7
14	(Spain) J. Castelló / (Spain) L. Rufo	2	5
6	(Spain) M. Ortega / (Spain) M. Calvo	2	4
2	(Spain) B. González / (Spain) P. Josemaria	6	6

Semi-Finals
1	(Argentina) D. Brea / (Spain) G. Triay	6	5	6
5	(Argentina) C. Jensen / (Spain) T. Icardo	3	7	1
4	(Spain) C. Fernández / (Portugal) S. Araújo	6	3	0
2	(Spain) B. González / (Spain) P. Josemaria	3	6	6

Finals
1	(Argentina) D. Brea / (Spain) G. Triay	5	2
2	(Spain) B. González / (Spain) P. Josemaria	7	6

== Results ==
=== Round of 32 ===
Men's

Date	Winners	Score	Opponent	Refs.
22/4/2026	(Spain) Alex Arroyo (Argentina) Leonel Aguirre	7–6 / 6–1	(Spain) Ignacio Sager (Argentina) Juan Cruz Belluati	
21/4/2026	(Spain) Jose Garcia Diestro (Argentina) Maximiliano Sánchez Blasco	6–2 / 3–6 / 6–4	(Spain) David Gala Sánchez (United Arab Emirates) Iñigo Jofre	
22/4/2026	(Spain) Coki Nieto (Spain) Jon Sanz	7–6 / 6–3	(Argentina) Alex Chozas (Argentina) Valentino Libaak	
21/4/2026	(Argentina) Martin Di Nenno (Spain) Momo González	6–3 / 6–2	(Spain) Pablo Garcia Rodrigo (Spain) Pablo Lijó	
21/4/2026	(Spain) Jairo Bautista (Brazil) Lucas Campagnolo	7–6 / 6–2	(Spain) Javi Leal (Spain) Pablo Cardona	
21/4/2026	(Belgium) Clement Geens (France) Dylan Guichard	6–3 / 7–6	(Belgium) Isaac Huysveld (Argentina) Miguel Lamperti	
22/4/2026	(Spain) Guillermo Collado (Spain) Pol Hernandez	6–4 / 6–4	(Argentina) Sanyo Gutiérrez (Spain) Victor Ruiz	
22/4/2026	(Spain) Aimar Goñi (Spain) Eduardo Alonso	6–3 / 6–3	(Spain) Daniel Santigosa (Spain) Marc Sintes	
22/4/2026	(Spain) Javier Garrido (Brazil) Lucas Bergamini	6–3 / 6–3	(Spain) Jose Solano Marmolejo (Argentina) Ramiro Pereyra	
21/4/2026	(Spain) Francisco Guerrero (Spain) Paquito Navarro	4–6 / 7–6 / 6–3	(Argentina) Juan Tello (Argentina) Maximiliano Arce	
22/4/2026	(Argentina) Agustin Gutiérrez (Spain) Salvador Oria	7–5 / 6–4	(Argentina) Gonzalo Alfonso (Spain) Javier Barahona	
21/4/2026	(Spain) Aléx Ruiz (Spain) Juanlu Esbri	6–4 / 6–4	(Spain) Javier Garcia Mora (Spain) Jose Jimenez Casas	

Women's

Date	Winners	Score	Opponent	Refs.
22/4/2026	(Spain) Jimena Velasco (Spain) Marta Barrera	6–1 / 6–2	(Belgium) Elyne Boeykens (Belgium) Justine Pysson	
22/4/2026	(Italy) Giulia Dal Pozzo (Spain) Nuria Rodriguez	3–6 / 6–4 / 6–1	(Argentina) Julieta Bidahorria (Spain) Marta Caparros	
22/4/2026	(Argentina) Aranzazu Osoro (Spain) Victoria Iglesias	6–1 / 6–0	(France) Carla Touly (Italy) Martina Parmigiani	
22/4/2026	(Spain) Beatriz Caldera (Spain) Carmen Goenaga	7–5 / 6–4	(Spain) Marta Talavan (Spain) Sofía Saiz Vallejo	
22/4/2026	(Argentina) Martina Fassio Goyeneche (Spain) Raquel Eugenio Barrera	3–6 / 6–0 / 6–0	(Spain) Agueda Perez (Spain) Lucia Martinez	
22/4/2026	(Spain) Jessica Castelló (Spain) Lorena Rufo	7–6 / 6–3	(Spain) Araceli Martinez (Spain) Lucía Sainz	
22/4/2026	(Spain) Letizia Manquillo (Spain) Noemi Aguilar	6–2 / 6–1	(Russia) Ksenia Sharifova (Spain) Marta Borrero	
22/4/2026	(Italy) Carolina Orsi (Spain) Patricia Llaguno	6–4 / 6–1	(Spain) Teresa Navarro (Argentina) Virginia Riera	

=== Round of 16 ===
Men's

Date	Winners	Score	Opponent	Refs.
23/4/2026	(Argentina) Agustín Tapia (Spain) Arturo Coello	6–1 / 7–6	(Spain) Alex Arroyo (Argentina) Leonel Aguirre	
23/4/2026	(Spain) Coki Nieto (Spain) Jon Sanz	6–4 / 7–5	(Spain) Jose Garcia Diestro (Argentina) Maximiliano Sánchez Blasco	
23/4/2026	(Spain) Jairo Bautista (Brazil) Lucas Campagnolo	7–5 / 6–4	(Argentina) Martin Di Nenno (Spain) Momo González	
23/4/2026	(Argentina) Franco Stupaczuk (Spain) Mike Yanguas	6–3 / 6–3	(Belgium) Clement Geens (France) Dylan Guichard	
23/4/2026	(Spain) Juan Lebrón (Argentina) Leandro Augsburger	6–2 / 7–6	(Spain) Guillermo Collado (Spain) Pol Hernandez	
23/4/2026	(Spain) Aimar Goñi (Spain) Eduardo Alonso	4–6 / 6–2 / 6–3	(Spain) Javier Garrido (Brazil) Lucas Bergamini	
23/4/2026	(Spain) Francisco Guerrero (Spain) Paquito Navarro	6–3 / 7–6	(Argentina) Agustin Gutiérrez (Spain) Salvador Oria7/6 6/1	
23/4/2026	(Spain) Alejandro Galán (Argentina) Federico Chingotto	7–6 / 6–1	(Spain) Aléx Ruiz (Spain) Juanlu Esbri	

Women's

Date	Winners	Score	Opponent	Refs.
23/4/2026	(Argentina) Delfina Brea (Spain) Gemma Triay	6–1 / 6–2	(Spain) Jimena Velasco (Spain) Marta Barrera	
23/4/2026	(Spain) Alejandra Alonso (Spain) Alejandra Salazar	7–6 / 6–2	(Italy) Giulia Dal Pozzo (Spain) Nuria Rodriguez	
23/4/2026	(Argentina) Claudia Jensen (Spain) Tamara Icardo	6–2 / 6–0	(Argentina) Aranzazu Osoro (Spain) Victoria Iglesias	
23/4/2026	(Spain) Andrea Ustero (Spain) Ariana Sánchez	6–0 / 6–3	(Spain) Beatriz Caldera (Spain) Carmen Goenaga	
23/4/2026	(Spain) Claudia Fernández (Portugal) Sofia Araújo	6–4 / 6–3	(Argentina) Martina Fassio Goyeneche (Spain) Raquel Eugenio Barrera	
23/4/2026	(Spain) Jessica Castelló (Spain) Lorena Rufo	6–3 / 6–2	(Spain) Marina Guinart (Spain) Verónica Virseda	
23/4/2026	(Spain) Marta Ortega (Spain) Martina Calvo	6–2 / 6–0	(Spain) Letizia Manquillo (Spain) Noemi Aguilar	
23/4/2026	(Spain) Bea González (Spain) Paula Josemaría	6–1 / 6–1	(Italy) Carolina Orsi (Spain) Patricia Llaguno	

=== Quarter-Finals ===
Men's

Date	Winners	Score	Opponent	Refs.
24/4/2026	(Argentina) Agustín Tapia (Spain) Arturo Coello	7–6 / 5–7 / 6–3	(Spain) Coki Nieto (Spain) Jon Sanz	
24/4/2026	(Argentina) Franco Stupaczuk (Spain) Mike Yanguas	6–1 / 6–2	(Spain) Jairo Bautista (Brazil) Lucas Campagnolo	
24/4/2026	(Spain) Juan Lebrón (Argentina) Leandro Augsburger	7–5 / 6–4	(Spain) Aimar Goñi (Spain) Eduardo Alonso	
24/4/2026	(Spain) Alejandro Galán (Argentina) Federico Chingotto	6–1 / 6–0	(Spain) Francisco Guerrero (Spain) Paquito Navarro	

Women's

Date	Winners	Score	Opponent	Refs.
24/4/2026	(Argentina) Delfina Brea (Spain) Gemma Triay	6–3 / 6–1	(Spain) Alejandra Alonso (Spain) Alejandra Salazar	
24/4/2026	(Argentina) Claudia Jensen (Spain) Tamara Icardo	6–4 / 6–2	(Spain) Andrea Ustero (Spain) Ariana Sánchez	
24/4/2026	(Spain) Claudia Fernández (Portugal) Sofia Araújo	6–2 / 7–5	(Spain) Jessica Castelló (Spain) Lorena Rufo	
24/4/2026	(Spain) Bea González (Spain) Paula Josemaría	6–2 / 6–4	(Spain) Marta Ortega (Spain) Martina Calvo	

=== Semi-Finals ===
Men's

Date	Winners	Score	Opponent	Refs.
25/4/2026	(Argentina) Agustín Tapia (Spain) Arturo Coello	7–5 / 6–2	(Argentina) Franco Stupaczuk (Spain) Mike Yanguas	
25/4/2026	(Spain) Juan Lebrón (Argentina) Leandro Augsburger	6–4 / 6–4	(Spain) Alejandro Galán (Argentina) Federico Chingotto	

Women's

Date	Winners	Score	Opponent	Refs.
25/4/2026	(Argentina) Delfina Brea (Spain) Gemma Triay	6–3 / 5–7 / 6–1	(Argentina) Claudia Jensen (Spain) Tamara Icardo	
25/4/2026	(Spain) Bea González (Spain) Paula Josemaría	3–6 / 6–3 / 6–0	(Spain) Claudia Fernández (Portugal) Sofia Araújo	

=== Finals ===
Men's

Date	Winners	Score	Opponent	Refs.
26/4/2026	(Spain) Juan Lebrón (Argentina) Leandro Augsburger	2–6 / 6–3 / 6–3	(Argentina) Agustín Tapia (Spain) Arturo Coello	

Women's

Date	Winners	Score	Opponent	Refs.
26/4/2026	(Spain) Bea González (Spain) Paula Josemaría	7–5 / 6–2	(Argentina) Delfina Brea (Spain) Gemma Triay	
