= 2024 Riyadh P1 =

Padel championships

- Date: 24 February – 2 March
- Edition: 1st
- Category: P1
- Prize money: €470,000
- Location: Riyadh, Saudi Arabia
- Venue: Padel Rush Arena

Champions
- Men's doubles: (Spain) Alejandro Galán (Spain) Juan Lebrón
- Women's doubles: (Argentina) Ariana Sanchez (Spain) Paula Josemaria

Chronology
Previous
Master Final (WPT)
Next
Qatar Major

The 2024 Riyadh P1 (officially Riyadh Season Premier Padel P1) was the first tournament of the third season organized by Premier Padel, promoted by the International Padel Federation, and with the financial backing of Nasser Al-Khelaïfi's Qatar Sports Investments, now serving as the premier padel circuit.

In the women's final, FIP number 1 ranked team, Ariana Sanchez and Paula Josemaria started their crown defense defeating Beatriz Gonzalez and Delfina Brea, FIP number 3 ranked team, winning their third tournament together as pair in Premier Padel.

In the men's final, FIP number 1 ranked team Alejandro Galán and Juan Lebrón defeated Agustín Tapia and Arturo Coello, FIP number 2 ranked team, winning their first tournament of the season and dethroning Coello to reclaim the number one ranking spot.

== Relevant Data ==
=== Changes in the Rankings ===
Due to the disputes between WPT and Premier Padel/FIP, which led FIP to disregard World Padel Tour tournaments held in 2023 from the rankings, FIP announced that their ranking would incorporate 21 tournaments from Premier in 2022 and 2023, as well as 2023 FIP Tour events, while counting only the three best results from WPT Master or Open 1000 tournaments since September 2023.

Due to this changes from FIP, despite winning 11 tournaments in World Padel Tour and four more in Premier Padel out of a total of 28 possible tournaments between the two circuits, Agustín Tapia and Arturo Coello did not start the year as the number one ranked duo.

== Seeds ==
Male

Rnk.	Team	FIP Ranking Points
1	(Spain) Alejandro Galán (Spain) Juan Lebrón	21534
2	(Argentina) Agustín Tapia (Spain) Arturo Coello	19554
3	(Argentina) Franco Stupaczuk (Argentina) Martin Di Nenno	17974
4	(Spain) Paquito Navarro (Argentina) Sanyo Gutiérrez	11858
5	(Argentina) Federico Chingotto (Spain) Momo Gonzalez	11053
6	(Argentina) Fernando Belasteguín (Argentina) Lucho Capra	9455
7	(Spain) Alejandro Ruiz (Argentina) Juan Tello	8198
8	(Brazil) Lucas Bergamini (Spain) Victor Ruiz	5579

Female

Rnk.	Team	FIP Ranking Points
1	(Spain) Ariana Sanchez (Spain) Paula Josemaria	23338
2	(Spain) Beatriz Gonzalez (Argentina) Delfina Brea	16931
3	(Spain) Gemma Triay (Spain) Marta Ortega	16693
4	(Spain) Alejandra Salazar (Spain) Tamara Icardo	9320
5	(Portugal) Sofia Araújo (Argentina) Virginia Riera	8167
6	(Argentina) Claudia Jensen (Spain) Jessica Castello	5850
7	(Argentina) Aranzazu Osoro (Spain) Veronica Virseda	7036
8	(Argentina) Barbara Las Heras (Spain) Victoria Iglesias	5296

== Head-to-head record between teams ranked in the top 4 during the season ==
=== Man's ===
Event	Coello–Tapia	Galán–Lebrón	Di Nenno–Stupaczuk	Paquito–Sanyo
Coello–Tapia	—	0–1	—	—
Galán–Lebrón	1–0	—	1–0	—
Di Nenno–Stupaczuk	—	0–1	—	—
Paquito–Sanyo	—	—	—	—

=== Women's ===
Event	Ariana–Paula	Gonzalez–D. Brea	Ortega–Triay	Icardo–Salazar
Ariana–Paula	—	1–0	—	1–0
B. Gonzalez–D. Brea	0–1	—	—	—
Ortega–Triay	—	—	—	—
Icardo–Salazar	0–1	—	—	—

== Draws ==
=== Men's Bracket ===
Round of 32
1	(Spain) Galán / (Spain) Lebrón	7	6
(Sweden) D. Windahl / (Spain) J. Marmolejo	6	1
Q	(Spain) J.J. Casas / (Argentina) M. Lamperti	4	6
9	(Spain) Coki / (Spain) J. Sanz	6	7
13	(Argentina) A. Gutierrez / (Brazil) L. Campagnolo	7	6
Q	(Spain) I. Jofre / (Spain) L.H. Quesada	5	3
(Spain) R. Duran / (Spain) S. Alba	3	1
8	(Brazil) L. Bergamini / (Spain) V. Ruiz	6	6
5	(Argentina) F. Chingotto / (Spain) Momo	6	6
Q	(Spain) A. Sans / (Spain) D. Sanchez	2	2
(Spain) J.G. Barahona / (Spain) J.G. Mora	4	6	3
10	(Spain) J. Garrido / (Spain) Yanguas	6	3	6
11	(Spain) G. Rubio / (Argentina) Maxi	6	7
(Spain) I. Ramirez / (Spain) P.G. Rodrigo	2	5
(Spain) A. Ayats / (Spain) F. Guerrero	4	3
3	(Argentina) F. Stupaczuk / (Argentina) Di Nenno	6	6
4	(Spain) Paquito / (Argentina) Sanyo	2	6	3
(Spain) J. Rico / (Spain) J. Esbri	6	1	6
(Spain) F. Guerrero / (Spain) T. Zapata	2	6	7
12	(Spain) F. Gil / (Argentina) R. Moyano	6	3	5
15	(Spain) J. Leal / (Spain) J.G. Diestro	6	7	5
(Spain) I. Sager / (Spain) S. Oria	7	6	7
(Spain) M. Semmler / (Spain) P. Lijó	1	6
7	(Spain) A. Ruiz / (Argentina) J. Tello	6	7
6	(Argentina) F. Belasteguín / (Argentina) L. Capra	6	1	4
(Italy) A. Patiniotis / (Italy) F. Dominguez	4	6	6
(Spain) J. Munoz / (Spain) J. Bautista	6	6	2
14	(Spain) A. Arroyo / (Spain) E. Alonso	4	7	6
16	(Argentina) J.C. Belluati / (Spain) P. Fernandez	2	1
(Argentina) A. Chozas / (Italy) D. Perino	6	6
(Spain) J. Ruiz / (Spain) P. Cardona
2	(Spain) Coello / (Argentina) Tapia

Round of 16
1	(Spain) Galán / (Spain) Lebrón	7	6
9	(Spain) Coki / (Spain) J. Sanz	5	3
13	(Argentina) A. Gutierrez / (Brazil) L. Campagnolo	6	6
8	(Brazil) L. Bergamini / (Spain) V. Ruiz	3	3
5	(Argentina) F. Chingotto / (Spain) Momo	3	6
10	(Spain) J. Garrido / (Spain) Yanguas	6	7
11	(Spain) G. Rubio / (Argentina) Maxi	4	1
3	(Argentina) F. Stupaczuk / (Argentina) Di Nenno	6	6
(Spain) J. Rico / (Spain) J. Esbri	6	6
(Spain) F. Guerrero / (Spain) T. Zapata	3	4
(Spain) I. Sager / (Spain) S. Oria	6	7	6
7	(Spain) A. Ruiz / (Argentina) J. Tello	7	6	0
(Italy) A. Patiniotis / (Italy) F. Dominguez	1	3
14	(Spain) A. Arroyo / (Spain) E. Alonso	6	6
(Argentina) A. Chozas / (Italy) D. Perino	5	6	3
2	(Spain) Coello / (Argentina) Tapia	7	4	6

Quarter-Final
1	(Spain) Galán / (Spain) Lebrón	6	6
13	(Argentina) A. Gutierrez / (Brazil) L. Campagnolo	1	2
10	(Spain) J. Garrido / (Spain) Yanguas	2	1
3	(Argentina) F. Stupaczuk / (Argentina) Di Nenno	6	6
(Spain) J. Rico / (Spain) J. Esbri	4	4
(Spain) I. Sager / (Spain) S. Oria	6	6
14	(Spain) A. Arroyo / (Spain) E. Alonso	3	4
2	(Spain) Coello / (Argentina) Tapia	6	6

Semi-Finals
1	(Spain) Galán / (Spain) Lebrón	6	4	6
3	(Argentina) F. Stupaczuk / (Argentina) Di Nenno	2	6	1
(Spain) I. Sager / (Spain) S. Oria	3	2
2	(Spain) Coello / (Argentina) Tapia	6	3	*

Finals
1	(Spain) Galán / (Spain) Lebrón	6	6	6
2	(Spain) Coello / (Argentina) Tapia	7	4	4

=== Women's Bracket ===
Round of 32
1	(Spain) A. Sanchez / (Spain) P. Josemaria	7	6
(Spain) M. Talavan / (Spain) N. Rodriguez	5	1
(Spain) E. Carnicero / (Russia) K. Sharifova	6	6
Q	(Spain) A.V. Ramos / (Spain) L. Alonso	3	3
(Spain) Lucía Sainz / (Spain) P. Llaguno	6	3	6
(Spain) J. Velasco / (Spain) N. Canovas	4	6	1
(Spain) C. Goenaga / (Spain) L. Martinez	4	6
7	(Argentina) A. Osoro / (Spain) V. Virseda	6	7
5	(Portugal) S. Araújo / (Argentina) V. Riera	6	6
(Italy) C. Casali / (Spain) L. Arruabarrena	2	3
Q	(Spain) C. Castillon / (Brazil) R. Piltcher	3	1
(Spain) C. Fernandez / (Spain) L. Rufo	6	6
(Portugal) A. Nogueira / (Spain) B. Sanchez	4	4
(Spain) M. Barrera / (Spain) M. Caparros	6	6
(Spain) A. Martinez / (Spain) S. Ruiz	3	6	1
4	(Spain) A. Salazar / (Spain) T. Icardo	6	2	6
3	(Spain) G. Triay / (Spain) M. Ortega	6	6	6
(Spain) M. Merino / (Spain) S. Saiz	7	3	0
Q	(Italy) G. Marchetti / (Spain) S. Pujals	6	2	6
(Spain) M. Abajo / (Spain) S. Bellver	4	6	4
(Spain) A. Cañellas / (Spain) Teresa Navarro	7	6
(France) A. Collombon / (Spain) A. Girdo	5	1
(Spain) A. Ustero / (Spain) A. Alonso	2	3
6	(Argentina) C. Jensen / (Spain) J. Castello
8	(Spain) B. Las Heras / (Spain) V. Iglesias	6	6
(Spain) A. Perez / (Spain) P. Martinez	4	2
(Italy) C. Orsi / (Spain) M. Lobo	5	6
(Sweden) C. Navarro / (Spain) M. Guinart	7	7
(Spain) A. Soriano Perez / (Spain) C. Mesa	6	6
WC	(Saudi Arabia) S. Salhab / (Spain) G. Perez	1	1
Q	(Spain) C. Velarde / (Spain) L. Exposito	1	1
2	(Spain) B. Gonzalez / (Argentina) D. Brea	6	6

Round of 16
1	(Spain) A. Sanchez / (Spain) P. Josemaria	6	6
(Spain) E. Carnicero / (Russia) K. Sharifova	1	3
(Spain) Lucía Sainz / (Spain) P. Llaguno	3	4
7	(Argentina) A. Osoro / (Spain) V. Virseda	6	6
5	(Portugal) S. Araújo / (Argentina) V. Riera	6	6
(Spain) C. Fernandez / (Spain) L. Rufo	2	1
(Spain) M. Barrera / (Spain) M. Caparros	3	2
4	(Spain) A. Salazar / (Spain) T. Icardo	6	6
3	(Spain) G. Triay / (Spain) M. Ortega	6	6
Q	(Italy) G. Marchetti / (Spain) S. Pujals	3	2
(Spain) A. Cañellas / (Spain) Teresa Navarro	3	1
6	(Argentina) C. Jensen / (Spain) J. Castello	6	6
8	(Spain) B. Las Heras / (Spain) V. Iglesias	2	2
(Sweden) C. Navarro / (Spain) M. Guinart	6	6
(Spain) A. Soriano Perez / (Spain) C. Mesa	1	2
2	(Spain) B. Gonzalez / (Argentina) D. Brea	6	6

Quarter-Final
1	(Spain) A. Sanchez / (Spain) P. Josemaria	6	6
7	(Argentina) A. Osoro / (Spain) V. Virseda	3	2
5	(Portugal) S. Araújo / (Argentina) V. Riera	1	3
4	(Spain) A. Salazar / (Spain) T. Icardo	6	6
3	(Spain) G. Triay / (Spain) M. Ortega	6	6
6	(Argentina) C. Jensen / (Spain) J. Castello	3	2
(Sweden) C. Navarro / (Spain) M. Guinart	1	2
2	(Spain) B. Gonzalez / (Argentina) D. Brea	6	6

Semi-Finals
1	(Spain) A. Sanchez / (Spain) P. Josemaria	6	6
4	(Spain) A. Salazar / (Spain) T. Icardo	3	3
6	(Argentina) C. Jensen / (Spain) J. Castello	4	3
2	(Spain) B. Gonzalez / (Argentina) D. Brea	6	6

Finals
1	(Spain) A. Sanchez / (Spain) P. Josemaria	6	6
2	(Spain) B. Gonzalez / (Argentina) D. Brea	3	2

== Results ==
=== First Round ===
Men's

Date	Winners	Score	Opponent	Refs.
26/2/2024	(Sweden) Daniel Windahl (Spain) Jose Solano Marmolejo	4–6 / 7–6 / 6–2	(Spain) Antonio Luque (Spain) Jose Luis Gonzalez	
26/2/2024	(Spain) Jose Jimenez Casas (Argentina) Miguel Lamperti	6–3 / 6–3	(Spain) Ignacio Vilariño Gestoso (Spain) Jose Rico	
26/2/2024	(Spain) Mario Del Castillo (Spain) Miguel Benítez	5–7 / 7–5 / 6–2	(Spain) Iñigo Jofre (Spain) Luis Hernandez Quesada	
26/2/2024	(Spain) Raul Marcos Duran (Spain) Sergio Alba	6–2 / 6–4	(Argentina) Agustin Gomez Silingo (Portugal) Gustavo Nunes	
26/2/2024	(Spain) Antón Sans (Spain) David Gala Sanchez	6–1 / 6–3	(Spain) Diego Gil Batista (Spain) Jesus Moya	
26/2/2024	(Spain) Javier Gonzalez Barahona (Spain) Javier García Mora	7–5 / 6–0	(Spain) Alvaro Cépero (Spain) Jose David Sanchez Serrano	
26/2/2024	(Spain) Ivan Ramirez (Spain) Pablo García Rodrigo	6–3 / 6–0	(Argentina) Cristian German Gutiérrez (Spain) Jorge Ruiz Gutiérrez	
26/2/2024	(Spain) Arnau Ayats (Argentina) Francisco Guerrero	2–6 / 6–3 / 6–2	(Spain) Carlos Marti (Spain) Miguel Solbes	
26/2/2024	(Spain) Javi Rico (Spain) Juanlu Esbri	6–1 / 6–4	(Spain) Aitor Garcia Bassas (Spain) Mario Huete	
26/2/2024	(Spain) Enrique Goenaga (Spain) Teodor Zapata	6–1 / 6–0	(Saudi Arabia) Abdullah Al Abdullah (Saudi Arabia) Faisal Al Rebdi	
26/2/2024	(Spain) Ignacio Sager (Spain) Salvador Oria	6–1 / 7–6	(Spain) Marc Quilez (Spain) Toni Bueno	
26/2/2024	(Spain) Miguel Semmler (Spain) Pablo Lijó	7–5 / 6–3	(Chile) Javier Valdes (Spain) Rafael Méndez	
26/2/2024	(Italy) Aris Patiniotis (Italy) Facundo Dominguez	6–0 / 6–1	(Kuwait) Abdulaziz Redha (Saudi Arabia) Omar Al Thagib	
26/2/2024	(Spain) Jaime Munoz (Spain) Jairo Bautista	6–3 / 6–3	(Spain) Fran Ramirez (Spain) Miguel Gonzalez García	
26/2/2024	(Argentina) Alex Chozas (Italy) Denis Perino	6–0 / 6–1	(Spain) Manuel Yuste Apolinar (Saudi Arabia) Sattam Al Shahrani	
26/2/2024	(Spain) Javi Ruiz (Spain) Pablo Cardona	6–3 / 6–7 / 7–6	(Spain) Alvaro Melendez Amaya (Spain) Pedro Melendez Amaya	

=== Round of 32 ===
Men's

Date	Winners	Score	Opponent	Refs.
27/2/2024	(Spain) Alejandro Galán (Spain) Juan Lebrón	7–6 / 6–1	(Sweden) Daniel Windahl (Spain) Jose Solano Marmolejo	
27/2/2024	(Spain) Coki Nieto (Spain) Jon Sanz	6–4 / 7–6	(Spain) Jose Jimenez Casas (Argentina) Miguel Lamperti	
27/2/2024	(Argentina) Agustin Gutiérrez (Brazil) Lucas Campagnolo	7–5 / 6–3	(Spain) Mario Del Castillo (Spain) Miguel Benítez	
27/2/2024	(Brazil) Lucas Bergamini (Spain) Víctor Ruiz	6–3 / 6–1	(Spain) Raul Marcos Duran (Spain) Sergio Alba	
27/2/2024	(Argentina) Federico Chingotto (Spain) Momo Gonzalez	6–2 / 6–2	(Spain) Antón Sans (Spain) David Gala Sanchez	
27/2/2024	(Spain) Javier Garrido (Spain) Miguel Yanguas	6–4 / 3–6 / 6–3	(Spain) Javier Gonzalez Barahona (Spain) Javier García Mora	
27/2/2024	(Spain) Gonzalo Rubio (Argentina) Maxi Sanchez	6–2 / 7–5	(Spain) Ivan Ramirez (Spain) Pablo García Rodrigo	
27/2/2024	(Argentina) Franco Stupaczuk (Argentina) Martin Di Nenno	6–4 / 6–3	(Spain) Arnau Ayats (Argentina) Francisco Guerrero	
27/2/2024	(Spain) Javi Rico (Spain) Juanlu Esbri	6–2 / 1–6 / 6–3	(Argentina) Sanyo Gutiérrez (Spain) Paquito Navarro	
27/2/2024	(Spain) Enrique Goenaga (Spain) Teodor Zapata	2–6 / 6–3 / 7–5	(Spain) Francisco Gil (Argentina) Ramiro Moyano	
27/2/2024	(Spain) Ignacio Sager (Spain) Salvador Oria	7–6 / 6–7 / 7–5	(Spain) Javi Leal (Spain) Jose García Diestro	
27/2/2024	(Spain) Alex Ruiz (Argentina) Juan Tello	6–1 / 7–6	(Spain) Miguel Semmler (Spain) Pablo Lijó	
27/2/2024	(Italy) Aris Patiniotis (Italy) Facundo Dominguez	4–6 / 6–1 / 6–4	(Argentina) Fernando Belasteguín (Argentina) Lucho Capra	
27/2/2024	(Spain) Alejandro Arroyo (Spain) Eduardo Alonso	4–6 / 7–6 / 6–2	(Spain) Jaime Munoz (Spain) Jairo Bautista	
27/2/2024	(Argentina) Alex Chozas (Italy) Denis Perino	6–2 / 6–1	(Argentina) Juan Cruz Belluati (Spain) Pincho Fernandez	
27/2/2024	(Argentina) Agustín Tapia (Spain) Arturo Coello	7–6 / 6–1	(Spain) Javi Ruiz (Spain) Pablo Cardona	

Women's

Date	Winners	Score	Opponent	Refs.
27/2/2024	(Spain) Ariana Sánchez (Spain) Paula Josemaria	7–5 / 6–1	(Spain) Marta Talavan (Spain) Nuria Rodriguez	
27/2/2024	(Spain) Esther Carnicero (Russia) Ksenia Sharifova	6–3 / 6–3	(Spain) Ana Varo Ramos (Spain) Lorena Alonso	
27/2/2024	(Spain) Lucía Sainz (Spain) Patty Llaguno	6–4 / 3–6 / 6–1	(Spain) Noa Canovas (Spain) Jimena Velasco	
27/2/2024	(Argentina) Aranzazu Osoro (Spain) Veronica Virseda	6–4 / 7–6	(Spain) Carmen Goenaga (Spain) Lucía Martinez	
27/2/2024	(Portugal) Sofia Araújo (Argentina) Virginia Riera	6–2 6–3	(Italy) Carlotta Casali (Spain) Lara Arruabarrena	
27/2/2024	(Spain) Claudia Fernandez (Spain) Lorena Rufo	6–3 / 6–1	(Spain) Carmen Castillon (Brazil) Raquel Piltcher	
27/2/2024	(Spain) Marta Barrera (Spain) Marta Caparrós	6–4 / 6–4	(Portugal) Ana Catarina Nogueira (Spain) Beatriz Caldera	
27/2/2024	(Spain) Alejandra Salazar (Spain) Tamara Icardo	6–3 / 2–6 / 6–1	(Spain) Araceli Martinez (Spain) Sara Ruiz	
27/2/2024	(Spain) Gemma Triay (Spain) Marta Ortega	6–7 / 6–3 / 6–0	(Spain) Melania Merino (Spain) Sofía Saiz	
27/2/2024	(Italy) Giorgia Marchetti (Spain) Sara Pujals	6–4 / 2–6 / 6–4	(Spain) Laia Rodriguez Abajo (Spain) Sandra Bellver	
27/2/2024	(Spain) Ariadna Cañellas (Spain) Teresa Navarro	7–5 / 6–1	(France) Alix Collombon (Sweden) Amanda Girdo	
27/2/2024	(Argentina) Claudia Jensen (Spain) Jessica Castelló	6–2 / 6–3	(Spain) Alejandra Alonso (Spain) Andrea Ustero	
27/2/2024	(Spain) Barbara Las Heras (Spain) Victoria Iglesias	6–4 / 6–2	(Spain) Agueda Perez (Spain) Patricia Martínez	
27/2/2024	(Sweden) Carolina Navarro (Spain) Marina Guinart	7–5 / 7–6	(Italy) Carolina Orsi (Spain) Marina Martinez Lobo	
27/2/2024	(Spain) Arantxa Soriano (Spain) Carla Mesa	6–1 / 6–1	(Argentina) Gimena Sol Perez (Saudi Arabia) Sara Mohammed Salhab	
27/2/2024	(Spain) Bea Gonzalez (Argentina) Delfina Brea	6–1 / 6–1	(Spain) Carla Castillo (Spain) Lucia Peralta	

=== Round of 16 ===
Men's

Date	Winners	Score	Opponent	Refs.
28/2/2024	(Spain) Alejandro Galán (Spain) Juan Lebrón	7–5 / 6–3	(Spain) Coki Nieto (Spain) Jon Sanz	
28/2/2024	(Argentina) Agustin Gutiérrez (Brazil) Lucas Campagnolo	6–3 / 6–3	(Brazil) Lucas Bergamini (Spain) Víctor Ruiz	
28/2/2024	(Spain) Javier Garrido (Spain) Miguel Yanguas	6–3 / 7–6	(Argentina) Federico Chingotto (Spain) Momo Gonzalez	
28/2/2024	(Argentina) Franco Stupaczuk (Argentina) Martin Di Nenno	6–4 / 6–1	(Spain) Gonzalo Rubio (Argentina) Maxi Sanchez	
28/2/2024	(Spain) Javi Rico (Spain) Juanlu Esbri	6–3 / 6–4	(Spain) Enrique Goenaga (Spain) Teodor Zapata	
28/2/2024	(Spain) Ignacio Sager (Spain) Salvador Oria	6–7 / 7–6 / 6–0	(Spain) Alex Ruiz (Argentina) Juan Tello	
28/2/2024	(Spain) Alejandro Arroyo (Spain) Eduardo Alonso	6–1 / 6–3	(Italy) Aris Patiniotis (Italy) Facundo Dominguez	
28/2/2024	(Argentina) Agustín Tapia (Spain) Arturo Coello	7–5 / 4–6 / 6–3	(Argentina) Alex Chozas (Italy) Denis Perino	

Women's

Date	Winners	Score	Opponent	Refs.
28/2/2024	(Spain) Ariana Sánchez (Spain) Paula Josemaria	6–1 / 6–3	(Spain) Esther Carnicero (Russia) Ksenia Sharifova	
28/2/2024	(Argentina) Aranzazu Osoro (Spain) Veronica Virseda	6–3 / 6–4	(Spain) Lucía Sainz (Spain) Patty Llaguno	
28/2/2024	(Portugal) Sofia Araújo (Argentina) Virginia Riera	6–2 / 6–1	(Spain) Claudia Fernandez (Spain) Lorena Rufo	
28/2/2024	(Spain) Alejandra Salazar (Spain) Tamara Icardo	6–3 / 6–2	(Spain) Marta Barrera (Spain) Marta Caparrós	
28/2/2024	(Spain) Gemma Triay (Spain) Marta Ortega	6–2 / 6–2	(Italy) Giorgia Marchetti (Spain) Sara Pujals	
28/2/2024	(Argentina) Claudia Jensen (Spain) Jessica Castelló	6–3 / 6–1	(Spain) Ariadna Cañellas (Spain) Teresa Navarro	
28/2/2024	(Sweden) Carolina Navarro (Spain) Marina Guinart	6–2 / 6–2	(Spain) Barbara Las Heras (Spain) Victoria Iglesias	
28/2/2024	(Spain) Bea Gonzalez (Argentina) Delfina Brea	6–1 / 6–2	(Spain) Arantxa Soriano (Spain) Carla Mesa	

=== Quarter-Finals ===
Men's

Date	Winners	Score	Opponent	Refs.
29/2/2024	(Spain) Alejandro Galán (Spain) Juan Lebrón	6–1 / 6–2	(Argentina) Agustin Gutiérrez (Brazil) Lucas Campagnolo	
29/2/2024	(Argentina) Franco Stupaczuk (Argentina) Martin Di Nenno	6–2 / 6–1	(Spain) Javier Garrido (Spain) Miguel Yanguas	
29/2/2024	(Spain) Ignacio Sager (Spain) Salvador Oria	6–4 / 6–4	(Spain) Javi Rico (Spain) Juanlu Esbri	
29/2/2024	(Argentina) Agustín Tapia (Spain) Arturo Coello	6–3 / 6–4	(Spain) Alejandro Arroyo (Spain) Eduardo Alonso	

Women's

Date	Winners	Score	Opponent	Refs.
29/2/2024	(Spain) Ariana Sánchez (Spain) Paula Josemaria	6–3 / 6–2	(Argentina) Aranzazu Osoro (Spain) Veronica Virseda	
29/2/2024	(Spain) Alejandra Salazar (Spain) Tamara Icardo	6–1 / 6–3	(Portugal) Sofia Araújo (Argentina) Virginia Riera	
29/2/2024	(Argentina) Claudia Jensen (Spain) Jessica Castelló	6–3 / 6–2	(Spain) Gemma Triay (Spain) Marta Ortega	
29/2/2024	(Spain) Bea Gonzalez (Argentina) Delfina Brea	6–1 / 6–2	(Sweden) Carolina Navarro (Spain) Marina Guinart	

=== Semi-Finals ===
Men's

Date	Winners	Score	Opponent	Refs.
1/3/2024	(Spain) Alejandro Galán (Spain) Juan Lebrón	6–2 / 4–6 / 6–1	(Argentina) Franco Stupaczuk (Argentina) Martin Di Nenno	
1/3/2024	(Argentina) Agustín Tapia (Spain) Arturo Coello	6–3 / 3–2 / W.O.	(Spain) Ignacio Sager (Spain) Salvador Oria	

Women's

Date	Winners	Score	Opponent	Refs.
1/3/2024	(Spain) Ariana Sánchez (Spain) Paula Josemaria	6–3 / 6–3	(Spain) Alejandra Salazar (Spain) Tamara Icardo	
1/3/2024	(Spain) Bea Gonzalez (Argentina) Delfina Brea	6–4 / 6–3	(Argentina) Claudia Jensen (Spain) Jessica Castelló	

=== Finals ===
Men's

Date	Winners	Score	Opponent	Refs.
2/3/2024	(Spain) Alejandro Galán (Spain) Juan Lebrón	6–7 / 6–4 / 6–4	(Argentina) Agustín Tapia (Spain) Arturo Coello	

Women's

Date	Winners	Score	Opponent	Refs.
2/3/2024	(Spain) Ariana Sánchez (Spain) Paula Josemaria	6–3 / 6–2	(Spain) Bea Gonzalez (Argentina) Delfina Brea	
