= Premier Padel 2026 =

Padel circut

Details
- Duration: 7 February – 13 December
- Edition: 5th
- Tournaments: 24
- Categories: Major (4); P1 (10); P2 (9); Tour Finals (1)

Achievements (singles)
- Most titles: Men's (Argentina) Agustín Tapia (Spain) Arturo Coello (13); Women's (Argentina) Delfina Brea (Spain) Gemma Triay (7)
- Most finals: Men's (Argentina) Agustín Tapia (Spain) Arturo Coello (18); Women's (Argentina) Delfina Brea (Spain) Gemma Triay (15)

The Premier Padel 2026 season was the fifth edition of the Premier Padel professional padel circuit.

The season was held throughout 2026 and consisted of 25 tournaments staged across 17 countries.

== Points distribution ==
Below is a series of tables showing the FIP ranking points a player can earn in Premier Padel tournaments.

=== Men's Points ===
Event	First Round	Second Round	Last Qualy	Bonus Qualy	Round of 64	Round of 32	Round of 16	QF	SF	F	W
Major		15	30	15	35	90	180	360	720	1200	2000
P1			18	10	22	45	90	180	360	600	1000
P2		7	15	5		22	45	90	180	360	600
Tour Finals									270 to 600	900	1500

=== Women's Points ===
Event	First Round	Second Round	Last Qualy	Bonus Qualy	Round of 64	Round of 32	Round of 16	QF	SF	F	W
Major			30	15	35	90	180	360	720	1200	2000
P1			18	10		45	90	180	360	600	1000
P2			15	5		22	45	90	180	360	600
Tour Finals									270 to 600	900	1500

== Court Speeds ==
Speed	Slow	Medium	Fast
(Saudi Arabia) Riyadh P1		✓	
(Spain) Gijón P2	✓		
(Mexico) Cancún P2			✓
(United States) Miami P1	✓		
(Egypt) NewGiza P2	✓		
(Belgium) Brussels P2		✓	
(Paraguay) Asunción P2			✓
(Argentina) Buenos Aires P1	✓		
Italy Major			✓
(Spain) Valencia P1		✓	
(Spain) Valladolid P2			✓
(France) Bordeaux P2	✓		
(Spain) Málaga P1			✓
(South Africa) Pretoria P1			✓
(United Kingdom) London P1		✓	
(Spain) Madrid P1		✓	
(France) Paris Major	✓		
(Netherlands) Rotterdam P2	✓		
Germany P2	✓		
(Italy) Milan P1			✓
Kuwait Major	✓		
(United Arab Emirates) Dubai P1			✓
Mexico Major
(Spain) Premier Padel Finals
Total	9	5	8

== Tournaments and results ==
Major P1 P2 Premier Padel Finals

Tournaments

Tournament	Date	Men's			Women's		
Tournament	Date	Winners	Score	Runners-up	Winners	Score	Runners-up
(Saudi Arabia) Riyadh P1	7 – 14 February	(Argentina) Agustín Tapia (Spain) Arturo Coello	6–4 / 6–2	(Spain) Alejandro Galán (Argentina) Federico Chingotto	(Spain) Andrea Ustero (Spain) Ariana Sánchez	3–6 / 6–1 / 6–4	(Argentina) Delfina Brea (Spain) Gemma Triay
(Spain) Gijón P2	1 – 8 March	(Spain) Alejandro Galán (Argentina) Federico Chingotto	7–5 / 7–6	(Argentina) Agustín Tapia (Spain) Arturo Coello	(Argentina) Delfina Brea (Spain) Gemma Triay	6–4 / 6–7 / 6–3	(Spain) Andrea Ustero (Spain) Ariana Sánchez
(Mexico) Cancún P2	15 – 22 March	(Argentina) Agustín Tapia (Spain) Arturo Coello	6–7 / 6–3 / 7–5	(Spain) Juan Lebrón (Argentina) Leo Augsburger	(Argentina) Delfina Brea (Spain) Gemma Triay	7–6 / 6–1	(Spain) Bea González (Spain) Paula Josemaría
(United States) Miami P1	22 – 29 March	(Spain) Alejandro Galán (Argentina) Federico Chingotto	7–5 / 3–6 / 6–3	(Argentina) Agustín Tapia (Spain) Arturo Coello	(Spain) Bea González (Spain) Paula Josemaría	6–3 / 4–6 / 7–5	(Argentina) Delfina Brea (Spain) Gemma Triay
Qatar Major	6 – 11 April	Cancelled (Note: The tournament was originally postponed but was ultimately cancelled for good due to the war in the East.)					
(Egypt) Giza P2	13 – 18 April	(Spain) Alejandro Galán (Argentina) Federico Chingotto	6–4 / 6–1	(Argentina) Franco Stupaczuk (Spain) Mike Yanguas	(Spain) Bea González (Spain) Paula Josemaría	6–4 / 5–7 / 6–4	(Argentina) Delfina Brea (Spain) Gemma Triay
(Belgium) Brussels P2	20 – 26 April	(Spain) Juan Lebrón (Argentina) Leandro Augsburger	2–6 / 6–3 / 6–3	(Argentina) Agustín Tapia (Spain) Arturo Coello	(Spain) Bea González (Spain) Paula Josemaría	7–5 / 6–2	(Argentina) Delfina Brea (Spain) Gemma Triay
(Paraguay) Asunción P2	4 – 10 May	(Spain) Alejandro Galán (Argentina) Federico Chingotto	6–3 / 7–5	(Argentina) Agustín Tapia (Spain) Arturo Coello	(Spain) Bea González (Spain) Paula Josemaría	4–6 / 6–3 / 6–3	(Argentina) Delfina Brea (Spain) Gemma Triay
(Argentina) Buenos Aires P1	11 – 17 May	(Spain) Alejandro Galán (Argentina) Federico Chingotto	6–2 / 6–1	(Argentina) Agustín Tapia (Spain) Arturo Coello	(Spain) Bea González (Spain) Paula Josemaría	6–3 / 7–5	(Argentina) Delfina Brea (Spain) Gemma Triay
Italy Major	1 – 7 June	(Argentina) Agustín Tapia (Spain) Arturo Coello	7–5 / 7–6	(Spain) Alejandro Galán (Argentina) Federico Chingotto	(Argentina) Delfina Brea (Spain) Gemma Triay	6–1 / 7–5	(Spain) Andrea Ustero (Spain) Ariana Sánchez
(Spain) Valencia P1	8 – 14 June	(Argentina) Agustín Tapia (Spain) Arturo Coello	6–7 / 6–1 / 7–6	(Spain) Alejandro Galán (Argentina) Federico Chingotto	(Spain) Andrea Ustero (Spain) Ariana Sánchez	6–4 / 3–6 / 6–2	(Spain) Claudia Fernández (Portugal) Sofia Araújo
(Spain) Valladolid P2	22 – 28 June	(Argentina) Agustín Tapia (Spain) Arturo Coello	6–4 / 6–3	(Spain) Alejandro Galán (Argentina) Federico Chingotto	(Spain) Bea González (Spain) Paula Josemaría	6–4 / 6–2	(Spain) Andrea Ustero (Spain) Ariana Sánchez
(France) Bordeaux P2	29 June – 5 July	(Argentina) Agustín Tapia (Spain) Arturo Coello	5–7 / 7–6 / 6–2	(Spain) Alejandro Galán (Argentina) Federico Chingotto	(Argentina) Claudia Jensen (Spain) Tamara Icardo	6–3 / 1–6 / 1–6	(Argentina) Delfina Brea (Spain) Gemma Triay
(Spain) Málaga P1	13 – 19 July	(Argentina) Agustín Tapia (Spain) Arturo Coello	6–2 / 6–2	(Spain) Juan Lebrón (Argentina) Leandro Augsburger	(Argentina) Delfina Brea (Spain) Gemma Triay	7–5 / 3–6 / 7–6	(Spain) Bea González (Spain) Paula Josemaría
(South Africa) Pretoria P1 (Note: The tournament was originally scheduled to be a P2, but with the cancellation of the Qatar Major, leaving a P1 slot becoming vacant, it was upgraded to a P1.)	27 July – 2 August	(Spain) Alejandro Galán (Argentina) Federico Chingotto	6–2 / 5–7 / 7–6	(Spain) Francisco Guerrero (Spain) Javier Leal	(Argentina) Delfina Brea (Spain) Gemma Triay	6–2 / 6–7 / 7–6	(Spain) Claudia Fernández (Spain) Martina Calvo
(United Kingdom) London P1	3 – 9 August	(Argentina) Agustín Tapia (Spain) Arturo Coello	6–3 / 5–7 / 7–5	(Spain) Alejandro Galán (Argentina) Federico Chingotto	(Spain) Claudia Fernández (Spain) Martina Calvo	7–5 / 6–3	(Argentina) Delfina Brea (Spain) Gemma Triay
(Spain) Madrid P1	31 August – 6 September	(Spain) Alejandro Galán (Argentina) Federico Chingotto	6–4 / 5–7 / 6–4	(Spain) Jorge 'Coki' Nieto (Spain) Mike Yanguas	(Argentina) Delfina Brea (Spain) Gemma Triay	6–7^{5} / 6–3 / 6–3	(Spain) Bea González (Spain) Paula Josemaría
(France) Paris Major	7 – 13 September	(Argentina) Agustín Tapia (Spain) Arturo Coello	6–3 / 4–6 / 7–6^{1}	(Spain) Alejandro Galán (Argentina) Federico Chingotto	(Spain) Andrea Ustero (Spain) Ariana Sánchez	6–2 / 6–0	(Spain) Claudia Fernández (Spain) Martina Calvo
(Netherlands) Rotterdam	28 September – 4 October	(Argentina) Agustín Tapia (Spain) Arturo Coello	6–3 / 6–2	(Argentina) Franco Stupaczuk (Spain) Jon Sanz	(Spain) Andrea Ustero (Spain) Ariana Sánchez	6–4 / 6–4	(Spain) Bea González (Spain) Paula Josemaría
Germany P2	5 – 11 October	(Argentina) Agustín Tapia (Spain) Arturo Coello	6–2 / 7–6^{5}	(Argentina) Franco Stupaczuk (Spain) Jon Sanz	(Spain) Claudia Fernández (Spain) Martina Calvo	6–3 / 6–0	(Spain) Andrea Ustero (Spain) Ariana Sánchez
(Italy) Milan P1	12 – 18 October	(Argentina) Agustín Tapia (Spain) Arturo Coello	4–6 / 6–3 / 6–2	(Spain) Juan Lebrón (Argentina) Leandro Augsburger	(Spain) Andrea Ustero (Spain) Ariana Sánchez	7–6^{5} / 6–3	(Spain) Bea González (Spain) Paula Josemaría
Kuwait Major (Note: The tournament was originally scheduled to be a P1, but with the cancellation of the Qatar Major and a vacancy opening up, it was upgraded to a Major.)	26 – 31 October	(Argentina) Agustín Tapia (Spain) Arturo Coello	6–1 / 6–1	(Argentina) Juan Tello (Argentina) Maximiliano Arce	(Argentina) Delfina Brea (Spain) Gemma Triay	3–6 / 6–1 / 6–1	(Spain) Andrea Ustero (Spain) Ariana Sánchez
(United Arab Emirates) Dubai P1	9 – 15 November	(Spain) Juan Lebrón (Argentina) Leandro Augsburger	7–6 / 5–7 / 6–3	(Argentina) Gonzalo Alfonso (Argentina) Valentino Libaak	(Spain) Claudia Fernández (Spain) Martina Calvo	7–5 / 6–1	(Spain) Bea González (Spain) Paula Josemaría
Mexico Major	23 – 29 November						
(Spain) Premier Padel Finals	7 – 13 December						

== Ranking Race 2026 ==
The points and tournaments won were last updated on 16 November 2026.

Male

2026 Men's Ranking			Tournaments Won				
N.º	Name	Points	P2	P1	Majors	Finals	Total
1	(Argentina) Agustín Tapia	16820	5	5	3	0	13
1	(Spain) Arturo Coello	16820	5	5	3	0	13
3	(Spain) Alejandro Galán	11980	3	4	0	0	7
3	(Argentina) Federico Chingotto	11980	3	4	0	0	7
5	(Spain) Juan Lebrón	7705	1	1	0	0	2
5	(Argentina) Leandro Augsburger	7705	1	1	0	0	2
7	(Argentina) Franco Stupaczuk	5400	0	0	0	0	0
8	(Spain) Mike Yanguas	4545	0	0	0	0	0
9	(Spain) Jon Sanz	4290	0	0	0	0	0
10	(Spain) Paquito Navarro	4184	0	0	0	0	0
11	(Argentina) Martín Di Nenno	3980	0	0	0	0	0
12	(Spain) Francisco Guerrero	3845	0	0	0	0	0
13	(Argentina) Juan Tello	3710	0	0	0	0	0
14	(Argentina) Maximiliano Arce	3550	0	0	0	0	0
15	(Spain) Momo González	3305	0	0	0	0	0
16	(Argentina) Gonzalo Alfonso	3300	0	0	0	0	0

Female

2026 Women's Ranking			Tournaments Won				
N.º	Name	Points	P2	P1	Majors	Finals	Total
1	(Argentina) Delfina Brea	14200	2	3	2	0	7
1	(Spain) Gemma Triay	14200	2	3	2	0	7
3	(Spain) Ariana Sánchez	11600	1	3	1	0	5
3	(Spain) Andrea Ustero	11600	1	3	1	0	5
5	(Spain) Beatriz González	10940	4	2	0	0	6
5	(Spain) Paula Josemaría	10940	4	2	0	0	6
7	(Spain) Claudia Fernández	9005	1	2	0	0	3
8	(Spain) Martina Calvo	8360	1	2	0	0	3
9	(Portugal) Sofia Araújo	5055	0	0	0	0	0
10	(Spain) Marta Ortega	4410	0	0	0	0	0
11	(Argentina) Claudia Jensen	4335	1	0	0	0	1
12	(Spain) Tamara Icardo	4155	1	0	0	0	1
13	(Spain) Marina Guinart	3480	0	0	0	0	0
14	(Spain) Alejandra Alonso	3155	0	0	0	0	0
15	(Spain) Alejandra Salazar	2975	0	0	0	0	0
16	(Spain) Verónica Virseda	2810	0	0	0	0	0
