= 2026 Dubai P1 =

Padel tournament held in Dubai, United Arab Emirates

- Date: 8 – 15 November
- Edition: 3rd
- Category: P1
- Prize money: €479.068
- Location: Dubai, United Arab Emirates
- Venue: Hamdan Sports Complex
- Court speed: Fast

Champions
- Men's doubles: (Spain) Juan Lebrón (Argentina) Leandro Augsburger
- Women's doubles: (Spain) Claudia Fernández (Spain) Martina Calvo

Chronology

The 2026 Dubai P1 (officially 2026 Premier Padel Emaar Dubai P1) is the twenty-second tournament of the fifth season organized by Premier Padel, the premier padel circuit, promoted by the International Padel Federation, and with the financial backing of Nasser Al-Khelaïfi's Qatar Sports Investments.

In the women's category, the second and fourth ranked pairs in the FIP rankings faced each other in a final for the first time this season. The number four pair, Claudia Fernández and Martina Calvo, took advantage of the elimination of the world's number 1s in the quarterfinals to defeat Claudia Jensen and Tamara Icardo, reaching their fifth final of the year. Their opponents were the second-ranked pair, Bea González and Paula Josemaria, who defeated the third-ranked pair, Andrea Ustero and Ariana Sánchez, to reach the final. In the championship match, Claudia and Martina defeated (the two-time defending champion) Bea and Paula in two sets, securing their third title of the season. With this victory, Martina won her first title in Dubai, while Claudia successfully defended the title she won the previous season, having now won 15 titles at only 20 years old.

In the men's category, with the absence of the two highest-ranked pairs, it was guaranteed that there would be a first-time champion. Gonzalo Alfonso and Valentino Libaak, the tenth-ranked pair, defeated Javi Garrido and Juan De Pascual to reach the final. Their opponents were the world number 3 (and second seeds in this tournament), Juan Lebrón and Leandro Augsburger, who eliminated Flavio Abbate and Franco Dal Bianco to compete in their fifth final of the year. In the final, Augsburger and Lebrón defeated Alfonso and Libaak in three sets, securing the pair's second title of the season, and their first in Dubai.

== Relevant data ==
=== Galán and Chingotto withdraw from the tournament ===
Before the tournament, the world's number two pair announced they would not compete in Dubai P1. The pair had already been forced to withdraw from the previous tournament in Kuwait, as Alejandro Galán is still recovering from a right-hand injury that would also have kept him out of the World Cup, where Spain had to compete without one of its key players.

This absence would benefit Francisco Guerrero and Javi Leal, who would enter as the sixth-ranked pair, even though they missed the registration deadline without even registering.

=== Agustín Tapia and Arturo Coello miss Dubai P1 ===
Agustín Tapia and Arturo Coello, the two-time defending champions who in the previous tournament had already mathematically secured finishing their fourth consecutive year as world number 1s, announced the day before their debut that they would not participate in the tournament in the United Arab Emirates to preserve their physical condition and finish the season in the best possible way.

== Seeds ==
Male
Rnk.	Team	FIP Ranking Points
1	(Argentina) Agustín Tapia (Spain) Arturo Coello	43812
2	(Spain) Juan Lebrón (Argentina) Leandro Augsburguer	15891
3	(Argentina) Franco Stupaczuk (Spain) Jon Sanz	12451
4	(Argentina) Martín Di Nenno (Spain) Paquito Navarro	10934
5	(Spain) Coki Nieto (Spain) Mike Yanguas	9941
6	(Spain) Francisco Guerrero (Spain) Javi Leal	8619
7	(Brazil) Lucas Campagnolo (Spain) Momo González	8087
8	(Argentina) Juan Tello (Argentina) Maximiliano Arce	7615
9	(Spain) Aimar Goñi (Spain) Eduardo Alonso	6436
10	(Argentina) Gonzalo Alfonso (Argentina) Valentino Libaak	6086
11	(Spain) Jairo Bautista (Brazil) Lucas Bergamini	5839
12	(United Arab Emirates) Inigo Jofre (Spain) Juanlu Esbri	4943
13	(Spain) Alejandro Ruiz (Spain) Javier Garcia Mora	4819
14	(Spain) Javi Garrido (Argentina) Juan De Pascual	4377
15	(Argentina) Maximiliano Sánchez Blasco (Argentina) Sanyo Gutiérrez	4133
16	(Argentina) Ignacio Piotto (Spain) Javier Barahona	3433

Female
Rnk.	Team	FIP Ranking Points
1	(Argentina) Delfina Brea (Spain) Gemma Triay	34612
2	(Spain) Bea González (Spain) Paula Josemaria	27514
3	(Spain) Ariana Sánchez (Spain) Andrea Ustero	27117
4	(Spain) Claudia Fernandéz (Spain) Martina Calvo	20759
5	(Spain) Marta Ortega (Portugal) Sofia Araújo	11812
6	(Argentina) Claudia Jensen (Spain) Tamara Icardo	10617
7	(Spain) Alejandra Alonso (Spain) Marina Guinart	8482
8	(Spain) Alejandra Salazar (Argentina) Aranzazu Osoro	7076
9	(Spain) Beatriz Caldera (Spain) Carmen Goenaga	6752
10	(Argentina) Martina Fassio Goyeneche (Spain) Veronica Virseda	6441
11	(Italy) Giulia Dal Pozzo (Spain) Nuria Rodriguez	5596
12	(Spain) Lorena Rufo (Spain) Victoria Iglesias	5439
13	(Spain) Jimena Velasco (Spain) Raquel Barrera	5381
14	(Italy) Carolina Orsi (Spain) Patricia Llaguno	4977
15	(Spain) Jana Montes (Spain) Marta Barrera	4256
16	(Spain) Jessica Castelló (Spain) Maria Rodriguez Abajo	4066

== Head-to-head record between teams ranked in the top 4 during the season ==
=== Men's ===
Record	Coello–Tapia	Galán–Chingotto	Augsburger–Lebrón	Sanz–Stupaczuk	Former Pairs	Di Nenno–Paquito	Stupaczuk–Yanguas
Coello–Tapia	—	7–4	9–1	3–0		2–0	5–0
Galán–Chingotto	4–7	—	4–3	0–2		3–0	3–0
Augsburger–Lebrón	1–9	3–4	—	—		0–1	—
Sanz–Stupaczuk	0–3	2–0	—	—		1–1	—
Former Pairs							
Di Nenno–Paquito	0–2	0–3	1–0	1–1		—	1–2
Stupaczuk–Yanguas	0–5	0–3	—	—		2–1	—

=== Women's ===
Record	D. Brea–Triay	B. González–Paula	Ariana–Ustero	C. Fernández–M. Calvo	Former Pairs	Araújo–C. Fernández
D. Brea–Triay	—	3–5	7–6	2–2		3–0
B. González–Paula	5–3	—	5–6	3–4		2–0
Ariana–Ustero	6–7	6–5	—	1–1		1–0
C. Fernández–M. Calvo	2–2	4–3	1–1	—		—
Former Pairs
Araújo–C. Fernández	0–3	0–2	0–1	—		—

== Draws ==
=== Men's Bracket ===
Round of 32
LL	(Spain) D. Garcia / (Spain) M. Blanco	6	3	7
19	(Argentina) A. Chozas / (Argentina) J. Rubini	4	6	6
18	(Argentina) L. Aguirre / (Spain) P. Lijó	3	4
10	(Argentina) G. Alfonso / (Argentina) V. Libaak	6	6
11	(Spain) J. Bautista / (Brazil) L. Bergamini	7	2	6
31	(Argentina) F. Mourino / (Spain) M. Quilez	5	6	3
Q	(Argentina) F. Calleja / (Spain) J. Barcelo	3	4
6	(Spain) F. Guerrero / (Spain) J. Leal	6	6
5	(Spain) Coki / (Spain) M. Yanguas	6	6	6
23	(Spain) J. Zamora / (Spain) M. Sintes	7	3	4
32	(Spain) F. Manuel Gil / (Argentina) R. Valenzuela	3	6
14	(Spain) J. Garrido / (Argentina) J. De Pascual	6	7
15	(Argentina) M.S. Blasco / (Argentina) Sanyo	6	6	7
21	(Spain) E. Goenaga / (Spain) G. Collado	7	1	6
WC	(United Arab Emirates) A. Ayats / (Spain) E. Chamero	3	1
3	(Argentina) F. Stupaczuk / (Spain) J. Sanz	6	5	*
4	(Argentina) Di Nenno / (Spain) Paquito	6	4	2
Q	(Spain) A. Roglan / (Spain) M. Aragon	0	6	6
30	(Argentina) F. Dal Bianco / (Italy) F. Abbate	4	6	6
13	(Spain) A. Ruiz / (Spain) J.G. Mora	6	1	4
12	(United Arab Emirates) I. Jofre / (Spain) J. Esbri	6	7
24	(Spain) J. Martinez / (Spain) L.H. Quesada	4	6
36	(Spain) J.L. González / (Spain) J.R. Gonzalez	3	5
7	(Brazil) L. Campagnolo / (Spain) Momo	6	7
8	(Argentina) J. Tello / (Argentina) M. Arce	6	6
Q	(Italy) F. Dominguez / (Spain) I. Sager	4	4
Q	(Spain) A. Naranjo / (Spain) T. Zapata	3	4
9	(Spain) A. Goñi / (Spain) E. Alonso	6	6
16	(Argentina) I. Piotto / (Spain) J. Barahona	6	3	4
28	(Argentina) F. Lopez / (Spain) V. Ruiz	4	6	6
20	(Spain) M. Castaño / (Spain) P.H. Álvarez	6	3	3
2	(Spain) Lebrón / (Argentina) L. Augsburger	4	6	6

Round of 16
LL	(Spain) D. Garcia / (Spain) M. Blanco	2	3
10	(Argentina) G. Alfonso / (Argentina) V. Libaak	6	6
11	(Spain) J. Bautista / (Brazil) L. Bergamini	1	7	6
6	(Spain) F. Guerrero / (Spain) J. Leal	6	5	3
5	(Spain) Coki / (Spain) M. Yanguas	6	6	6
14	(Spain) J. Garrido / (Argentina) J. De Pascual	7	3	7
15	(Argentina) M.S. Blasco / (Argentina) Sanyo	3	4
3	(Argentina) F. Stupaczuk / (Spain) J. Sanz	6	6
Q	(Spain) A. Roglan / (Spain) M. Aragon	6	3
30	(Argentina) F. Dal Bianco / (Italy) F. Abbate	7	6
12	(United Arab Emirates) I. Jofre / (Spain) J. Esbri	3	3
7	(Brazil) L. Campagnolo / (Spain) Momo	6	6
8	(Argentina) J. Tello / (Argentina) M. Arce	3	6	6
9	(Spain) A. Goñi / (Spain) E. Alonso	6	3	2
28	(Argentina) F. Lopez / (Spain) V. Ruiz	2	4
2	(Spain) Lebrón / (Argentina) L. Augsburger	6	6

Quarter-Final
10	(Argentina) G. Alfonso / (Argentina) V. Libaak	4	6	7
11	(Spain) J. Bautista / (Brazil) L. Bergamini	6	3	6
14	(Spain) J. Garrido / (Argentina) J. De Pascual	6	7
3	(Argentina) F. Stupaczuk / (Spain) J. Sanz	1	5
30	(Argentina) F. Dal Bianco / (Italy) F. Abbate	7	3	6
7	(Brazil) L. Campagnolo / (Spain) Momo	6	6	2
8	(Argentina) J. Tello / (Argentina) M. Arce	3	6	2
2	(Spain) Lebrón / (Argentina) L. Augsburger	6	3	6

Semi-Finals
10	(Argentina) G. Alfonso / (Argentina) V. Libaak	6	6
14	(Spain) J. Garrido / (Argentina) J. De Pascual	1	4
30	(Argentina) F. Dal Bianco / (Italy) F. Abbate	4	2
2	(Spain) Lebrón / (Argentina) L. Augsburger	6	6

Finals
10	(Argentina) G. Alfonso / (Argentina) V. Libaak	6	7	3
2	(Spain) Lebrón / (Argentina) L. Augsburger	7	5	6

=== Women's Bracket ===
Round of 32
1	(Argentina) D. Brea / (Spain) G. Triay
Bye
Q	(Spain) C. Escacena / (Spain) N. Aguilar	4	2
19	(Spain) M. Talavan / (Spain) S. Saiz	6	6
Q	(Spain) M. Arellano / (Germany) V. Kurz	6	6
WC	(Spain) M. De Leon / (Argentina) M. Vega	3	1
11	(Italy) G. Dal Pozzo / (Spain) N. Rodriguez	2	3
6	(Argentina) C. Jensen / (Spain) T. Icardo	6	6
8	(Spain) A. Salazar / (Argentina) A. Osoro	3	6	2
12	(Spain) L. Rufo / (Spain) V. Iglesias	6	2	6
Q	(Spain) A. Lopez / (Spain) C. Goyeneche	7	6
22	(Spain) A. Perez / (Spain) M. Caparros	5	3
16	(Spain) J. Castelló / (Spain) M.R. Abajo	4	7	6
21	(Spain) A. Martinez / (Spain) L. Martinez	6	5	1
Bye
4	(Spain) C. Fernández / (Spain) M. Calvo
3	(Spain) A. Ustero / (Spain) A. Sánchez
Bye
18	(Argentina) J. Bidahorria / (Argentina) V. Riera	6	1	4
17	(Spain) L. Manquillo / (Spain) L. Sainz	1	6	6
13	(Spain) J. Velasco / (Spain) R. Barrera	7	7
14	(Italy) C. Orsi / (Spain) P. Llaguno	6	6
Q	(Spain) A. Ortiz / (Argentina) M. Ferreyra	6	3	0
5	(Spain) M. Ortega / (Portugal) S. Araújo	4	6	6
7	(Spain) A. Alonso / (Spain) M. Guinart	7	6
15	(Spain) J. Montes / (Spain) M. Barrera	5	2
9	(Spain) B. Caldera / (Spain) C. Goenaga	3	0
20	(Spain) M. Lobo / (Spain) N. Canovas	6	6
23	(France) A. Collombon / (Russia) K. Sharifova	2	5
10	(Argentina) M. Goyeneche / (Spain) V. Virseda	6	7
Bye
2	(Spain) Bea González / (Spain) P. Josemaria

Round of 16
1	(Argentina) D. Brea / (Spain) G. Triay	6	6
19	(Spain) M. Talavan / (Spain) S. Saiz	3	1
Q	(Spain) M. Arellano / (Germany) V. Kurz	4	2
6	(Argentina) C. Jensen / (Spain) T. Icardo	6	6
12	(Spain) L. Rufo / (Spain) V. Iglesias	6	4	6
Q	(Spain) A. Lopez / (Spain) C. Goyeneche	4	6	2
16	(Spain) J. Castelló / (Spain) M.R. Abajo	6	4
4	(Spain) C. Fernández / (Spain) M. Calvo	7	6
3	(Spain) A. Ustero / (Spain) A. Sánchez	6	6
17	(Spain) L. Manquillo / (Spain) L. Sainz	0	4
13	(Spain) J. Velasco / (Spain) R. Barrera	4	6	6
5	(Spain) M. Ortega / (Portugal) S. Araújo	6	4	3
7	(Spain) A. Alonso / (Spain) M. Guinart	6	6
20	(Spain) M. Lobo / (Spain) N. Canovas	4	2
10	(Argentina) M. Goyeneche / (Spain) V. Virseda	4	1
2	(Spain) Bea González / (Spain) P. Josemaria	6	6

Quarter-Final
1	(Argentina) D. Brea / (Spain) G. Triay	3	6	1
6	(Argentina) C. Jensen / (Spain) T. Icardo	6	3	6
12	(Spain) L. Rufo / (Spain) V. Iglesias	6	4
4	(Spain) C. Fernández / (Spain) M. Calvo	7	6
3	(Spain) A. Ustero / (Spain) A. Sánchez	6	6
13	(Spain) J. Velasco / (Spain) R. Barrera	2	3
7	(Spain) A. Alonso / (Spain) M. Guinart	3	1
2	(Spain) Bea González / (Spain) P. Josemaria	6	6

Semi-Finals
6	(Argentina) C. Jensen / (Spain) T. Icardo	3	1
4	(Spain) C. Fernández / (Spain) M. Calvo	6	6
3	(Spain) A. Ustero / (Spain) A. Sánchez	4	5
2	(Spain) Bea González / (Spain) P. Josemaria	6	7

Finals
4	(Spain) C. Fernández / (Spain) M. Calvo	7	6
2	(Spain) Bea González / (Spain) P. Josemaria	5	1

== Results ==
=== First Round ===
Men's
Date	Winners	Score	Opponent	Ref.
10/11/2026	(Argentina) Alex Chozas (Argentina) Juan Ignacio Rubini	6–2 / 6–4	(Spain) Álvaro Cepero (Spain) Pincho Fernández	
10/11/2026	(Argentina) Leonel Aguirre (Spain) Pablo Lijó	6–2 / 6–2	(United Arab Emirates) Ignacio Vilariño (Spain) Mario Del Castillo	
10/11/2026	(Argentina) Federico Mouriño (Spain) Marc Quilez	6–4 / 6–7 / 6–4	(United Arab Emirates) Francisco Jurado Sosa (United Arab Emirates) Sergio Icardo	
10/11/2026	(Argentina) Felipe Calleja (Spain) Jaume Romera Barcelo	6–1 / 7–6	(Italy) Alvaro Montiel (Spain) Daniel Santigosa	
10/11/2026	(Spain) Juan Zamora (Spain) Marc Sintes	6–2 / 6–4	(Argentina) Lucho Capra (Argentina) Maxi Sánchez	
10/11/2026	(Spain) Francisco Manuel Gil (Argentina) Ramiro Valenzuela	6–2 / 6–3	(Spain) Alonso Rodriguez Martinez (Spain) Pablo Garcia Rodrigo	
10/11/2026	(Spain) Enrique Goenaga (Spain) Guillermo Collado	6–2 / 6–3	(Argentina) Juan Cruz Belluati (Paraguay) Martin Abud	
10/11/2026	(United Arab Emirates) Arnau Ayats (Spain) Emilio Sánchez Chamero	5–7 / 7–5 / 7–6	(Spain) Andres Fernandez Lancha (Spain) Jose Garcia Diestro	
10/11/2026	(Spain) Albert Roglan Pons (Spain) Manuel Aragon	6–7 / 6–4 / 7–6	(Chile) Javier Valdes (Argentina) Renzo Gabriel	
10/11/2026	(Italy) Flavio Abbate (Argentina) Franco Dal Bianco	7–6 / 6–4	(Italy) Denis Perino (Argentina) Ramiro Pereyra	
10/11/2026	(Spain) Javier Martinez (Spain) Luis Hernandez Quesada	6–3 / 6–4	(Belgium) Clement Geens (France) Dylan Guichard	
10/11/2026	(Spain) Javier Ruiz Gonzalez (Spain) Jose Luis Gonzalez	6–4 / 6–4	(Spain) David Gala Sánchez (Italy) Enzo Jensen	
10/11/2026	(Italy) Facundo Dominguez (Spain) Ignacio Sager	4–6 / 7–6 / 6–4	(Spain) Francisco Cabeza (Paraguay) Mariano San Martin	
10/11/2026	(Spain) Adrian Naranjo Martinez (Spain) Teodoro Zapata	6–1 / 6–2	(Spain) Aaron Garcia Rubio (Spain) Javier Lopez Garcia	
10/11/2026	(Argentina) Facundo Lopez (Spain) Victor Ruiz	7–5 / 5–7 / 6–4	(Spain) Jesus Moya (France) Thomas Leygue	
10/11/2026	(Spain) Manuel Castaño (Spain) Pol Hernandez Alvarez	7–6 / 3–6 / 7–6	(Portugal) Miguel Deus (Portugal) Nuno Deus	

=== Round of 32 ===
Men's
Date	Winners	Score	Opponent	Ref.
11/11/2026	(Spain) Diego Garcia Garcia (Spain) Marcos González Blanco	6–4 / 3–6 / 7–6	(Argentina) Alex Chozas (Argentina) Juan Ignacio Rubini	
11/11/2026	(Argentina) Gonzalo Alfonso (Argentina) Valentino Libaak	6–3 / 6–4	(Argentina) Leonel Aguirre (Spain) Pablo Lijó	
11/11/2026	(Spain) Jairo Bautista (Brazil) Lucas Bergamini	7–5 / 2–6 / 6–3	(Argentina) Federico Mouriño (Spain) Marc Quilez	
11/11/2026	(Spain) Francisco Guerrero (Spain) Javi Leal	6–3 / 6–4	(Argentina) Felipe Calleja (Spain) Jaume Romera Barcelo	
11/11/2026	(Spain) Coki Nieto (Spain) Mike Yanguas	6–7 / 6–3 / 6–4	(Spain) Juan Zamora (Spain) Marc Sintes	
11/11/2026	(Spain) Javi Garrido (Argentina) Juan De Pascual	6–3 / 7–6	(Spain) Francisco Manuel Gil (Argentina) Ramiro Valenzuela	
11/11/2026	(Argentina) Maxi Sánchez Blasco (Argentina) Sanyo Gutiérrez	6–7 / 6–1 / 7–6	(Spain) Enrique Goenaga (Spain) Guillermo Collado	
11/11/2026	(Argentina) Franco Stupaczuk (Spain) Jon Sanz	6–3 / 5–1 / W.O.	(United Arab Emirates) Arnau Ayats (Spain) Emilio Sánchez Chamero	
11/11/2026	(Spain) Albert Roglan Pons (Spain) Manuel Aragon	0–6 / 6–4 / 6–2	(Argentina) Martin Di Nenno (Spain) Paquito Navarro	
11/11/2026	(Italy) Flavio Abbate (Argentina) Franco Dal Bianco	4–6 / 6–1 / 6–4	(Spain) Alejandro Ruiz (Spain) Javier Garcia Mora	
11/11/2026	(United Arab Emirates) Inigo Jofre (Spain) Juanlu Esbri	6–4 / 7–6	(Spain) Javier Martinez (Spain) Luis Hernandez Quesada	
11/11/2026	(Brazil) Lucas Campagnolo (Spain) Momo González	6–3 / 7–5	(Spain) Javier Ruiz Gonzalez (Spain) Jose Luis Gonzalez	
11/11/2026	(Argentina) Juan Tello (Argentina) Maximiliano Arce	6–4 / 6–4	(Italy) Facundo Dominguez (Spain) Ignacio Sager	
11/11/2026	(Spain) Aimar Goñi (Spain) Eduardo Alonso	6–3 / 6–4	(Spain) Adrian Naranjo Martinez (Spain) Teodoro Zapata	
11/11/2026	(Argentina) Facundo Lopez (Spain) Victor Ruiz	4–6 / 6–3 / 6–4	(Argentina) Ignacio Piotto (Spain) Javier Barahona	
11/11/2026	(Spain) Juan Lebrón (Argentina) Leandro Augsburger	4–6 / 6–3 / 6–3	(Spain) Manuel Castaño (Spain) Pol Hernandez Alvarez	

Women's
Date	Winners	Score	Opponent	Ref.
11/11/2026	(Spain) Marta Talavan (Spain) Sofia Saiz	6–4 / 6–2	(Spain) Claudia Escacena (Spain) Noemi Aguilar	
10/11/2026	(Spain) Marta Arellano (Germany) Victoria Kurz	6–3 / 6–1	(Spain) Malena De Leon Jackson (Argentina) María Constanza Vega	
11/11/2026	(Argentina) Claudia Jensen (Spain) Tamara Icardo	6–2 / 6–3	(Italy) Giulia Dal Pozzo (Spain) Nuria Rodriguez	
10/11/2026	(Spain) Lorena Rufo (Spain) Victoria Iglesias	6–3 / 2–6 / 6–2	(Spain) Alejandra Salazar (Argentina) Aranzazu Osoro	
10/11/2026	(Spain) Amanda Lopez (Spain) Camila Fassio Goyeneche	7–5 / 6–3	(Spain) Agueda Perez (Spain) Marta Caparros	
10/11/2026	(Spain) Jessica Castelló (Spain) Maria Rodriguez Abajo	4–6 / 7–5 / 6–1	(Spain) Araceli Martinez (Spain) Lucia Martinez	
10/11/2026	(Spain) Letizia Manquillo (Spain) Lucía Sainz	1–6 / 6–1 / 6–4	(Argentina) Julieta Bidahorria (Argentina) Virginia Riera	
11/11/2026	(Spain) Jimena Velasco (Spain) Raquel Barrera	7–6 / 7–6	(Italy) Carolina Orsi (Spain) Patricia Llaguno	
11/11/2026	(Spain) Marta Ortega (Portugal) Sofia Araújo	4–6 / 6–3 / 6–0	(Spain) Anna Ortiz (Argentina) Maria Laura Ferreyra	
11/11/2026	(Spain) Alejandra Alonso (Spain) Marina Guinart	7–5 / 6–2	(Spain) Jana Montes (Spain) Marta Barrera	
11/11/2026	(Spain) Marina Lobo (Spain) Noa Canovas	6–3 / 6–0	(Spain) Beatriz Caldera (Spain) Carmen Goenaga	
10/11/2026	(Argentina) Martina Fassio Goyeneche (Spain) Veronica Virseda	6–2 / 7–5	(France) Alix Collombon (Russia) Ksenia Sharifova	

=== Round of 16 ===
Men's
Date	Winners	Score	Opponent	Ref.
12/11/2026	(Argentina) Gonzalo Alfonso (Argentina) Valentino Libaak	6–2 / 6–3	(Spain) Diego Garcia Garcia (Spain) Marcos González Blanco	
12/11/2026	(Spain) Jairo Bautista (Brazil) Lucas Bergamini	1–6 / 7–5 / 6–3	(Spain) Francisco Guerrero (Spain) Javi Leal	
12/11/2026	(Spain) Javi Garrido (Argentina) Juan De Pascual	7–6 / 3–6 / 7–6	(Spain) Coki Nieto (Spain) Mike Yanguas	
12/11/2026	(Argentina) Franco Stupaczuk (Spain) Jon Sanz	6–3 / 6–4	(Argentina) Maxi Sánchez Blasco (Argentina) Sanyo Gutiérrez	
12/11/2026	(Italy) Flavio Abbate (Argentina) Franco Dal Bianco	7–6 / 6–3	(Spain) Albert Roglan Pons (Spain) Manuel Aragon	
12/11/2026	(Brazil) Lucas Campagnolo (Spain) Momo González	6–3 / 6–3	(United Arab Emirates) Inigo Jofre (Spain) Juanlu Esbri	
12/11/2026	(Argentina) Juan Tello (Argentina) Maximiliano Arce	3–6 / 6–3 / 6–2	(Spain) Aimar Goñi (Spain) Eduardo Alonso	
12/11/2026	(Spain) Juan Lebrón (Argentina) Leandro Augsburger	6–2 / 6–4	(Argentina) Facundo Lopez (Spain) Victor Ruiz	

Women's
Date	Winners	Score	Opponent	Ref.
12/11/2026	(Argentina) Delfina Brea (Spain) Gemma Triay	6–3 / 6–1	(Spain) Marta Talavan (Spain) Sofia Saiz	
12/11/2026	(Argentina) Claudia Jensen (Spain) Tamara Icardo	6–4 / 6–2	(Spain) Marta Arellano (Germany) Victoria Kurz	
12/11/2026	(Spain) Lorena Rufo (Spain) Victoria Iglesias	6–4 / 4–6 / 6–2	(Spain) Amanda Lopez (Spain) Camila Fassio Goyeneche	
12/11/2026	(Spain) Claudia Fernández (Spain) Martina Calvo	7–6 / 6–4	(Spain) Jessica Castelló (Spain) Maria Rodriguez Abajo	
12/11/2026	(Spain) Andrea Ustero (Spain) Ariana Sánchez	6–0 / 6–4	(Spain) Letizia Manquillo (Spain) Lucía Sainz	
12/11/2026	(Spain) Jimena Velasco (Spain) Raquel Barrera	4–6 / 6–4 / 6–3	(Spain) Marta Ortega (Portugal) Sofia Araújo	
12/11/2026	(Spain) Alejandra Alonso (Spain) Marina Guinart	6–4 / 6–2	(Spain) Marina Lobo (Spain) Noa Canovas	
12/11/2026	(Spain) Bea González (Spain) Paula Josemaría	6–4 / 6–1	(Argentina) Martina Fassio Goyeneche (Spain) Veronica Virseda	

=== Quarter-Finals ===
Men's
Date	Winners	Score	Opponent	Ref.
13/11/2026	(Argentina) Gonzalo Alfonso (Argentina) Valentino Libaak	4–6 / 6–3 / 7–6	(Spain) Jairo Bautista (Brazil) Lucas Bergamini	
13/11/2026	(Spain) Javi Garrido (Argentina) Juan De Pascual	6–1 / 7–5	(Argentina) Franco Stupaczuk (Spain) Jon Sanz	
13/11/2026	(Italy) Flavio Abbate (Argentina) Franco Dal Bianco	7–6 / 3–6 / 6–2	(Brazil) Lucas Campagnolo (Spain) Momo González	
13/11/2026	(Spain) Juan Lebrón (Argentina) Leandro Augsburger	6–3 / 3–6 / 6–2	(Argentina) Juan Tello (Argentina) Maximiliano Arce	

Women's
Date	Winners	Score	Opponent	Ref.
13/11/2026	(Argentina) Claudia Jensen (Spain) Tamara Icardo	6–3 / 3–6 / 6–1	(Argentina) Delfina Brea (Spain) Gemma Triay	
13/11/2026	(Spain) Claudia Fernández (Spain) Martina Calvo	7–6 / 6–4	(Spain) Lorena Rufo (Spain) Victoria Iglesias	
13/11/2026	(Spain) Andrea Ustero (Spain) Ariana Sánchez	6–2 / 6–3	(Spain) Jimena Velasco (Spain) Raquel Barrera	
13/11/2026	(Spain) Bea González (Spain) Paula Josemaría	6–3 / 6–1	(Spain) Alejandra Alonso (Spain) Marina Guinart	

=== Semi-Finals ===
Men's
Date	Winners	Score	Opponent	Ref.
14/11/2026	(Argentina) Gonzalo Alfonso (Argentina) Valentino Libaak	6–1 / 6–4	(Spain) Javi Garrido (Argentina) Juan De Pascual	
14/11/2026	(Spain) Juan Lebrón (Argentina) Leandro Augsburger	6–4 / 6–2	(Italy) Flavio Abbate (Argentina) Franco Dal Bianco	

Women's
Date	Winners	Score	Opponent	Ref.
14/11/2026	(Spain) Claudia Fernández (Spain) Martina Calvo	6–3 / 6–1	(Argentina) Claudia Jensen (Spain) Tamara Icardo	
14/11/2026	(Spain) Bea González (Spain) Paula Josemaría	6–4 / 7–5	(Spain) Andrea Ustero (Spain) Ariana Sánchez	

=== Finals ===
Men's
Date	Team	Score	Opponent	Ref.
15/11/2026	(Spain) Juan Lebrón (Argentina) Leandro Augsburger	7–6 / 5–7 / 6–3	(Argentina) Gonzalo Alfonso (Argentina) Valentino Libaak	

Women's
Date	Team	Score	Opponent	Ref.
15/11/2026	(Spain) Claudia Fernández (Spain) Martina Calvo	7–5 / 6–1	(Spain) Bea González (Spain) Paula Josemaría	
