= 2026 NewGiza P2 =

Premier Padel tournament held in Giza

- Date: 11 – 18 April
- Edition: 4th
- Category: P2
- Prize money: €264.534
- Location: Giza, Egypt
- Venue: Newgiza Sports Club
- Court speed: Slow

Champions
- Men's doubles: (Spain) Alejandro Galán (Argentina) Federico Chingotto
- Women's doubles: (Spain) Bea González (Spain) Paula Josemaría

Chronology

The 2026 NewGiza P2 (officially 2026 Premier Padel NewGiza P2) was the fifth tournament of the fifth season organized by Premier Padel, the premier padel circuit, promoted by the International Padel Federation, and with the financial backing of Nasser Al-Khelaïfi's Qatar Sports Investments.

In the women's category, the two highest-ranked pairs on the FIP rankings both reached the final for the third time in 2026. In the decisive match, Bea González and Paula Josemaría repeated their victory in Miami, defeating Delfina Brea and Gemma Triay, who were playing their fifth consecutive final of the year, to claim their second title of the season.

In the men's category, with Coello and Tapia (top-ranked pair) absent, the two highest-seeded pairs in the tournament reached the finals, marking the first time Franco Stupaczuk and Mike Yanguas had done so in this season. In the final, Alejandro Galán and Federico Chingotto defeated Stupaczuk and Yanguas, claiming their second consecutive title and their third of 2026.

== Relevant Data ==
=== Third year without the world No. 1s ===
Just as in 2024 and 2025, Agustín Tapia and Arturo Coello have opted not to compete in the Giza P2, marking the third year the world No. 1s have missed the tournament.

=== Paula becomes the most decorated player ===
With her victory in the final, Paula Josemaria reached a career total of 19 Premier Padel titles, becoming the most successful player on the circuit. She broke the tie with four other players at the top of the women's rankings, surpassing her former partner Ariana Sánchez, as well as Gemma Triay and Delfina Brea, who all hold 18 titles.

=== Galán reclaims the record ===
In the men's draw, Alejandro Galán, following the win by along with Federico Chingotto over Franco Stupaczuk and Mike Yanguas in the final, the Madrid-born player secured the 56th title of his career, cementing his status as the most successful active player, surpassing Tapia.

== Seeds ==
Male

Rnk.	Team	FIP Ranking Points
1	(Spain) Alejandro Galán (Argentina) Federico Chingotto	34680
2	(Argentina) Franco Stupaczuk (Spain) Mike Yanguas	12345
3	(Spain) Juan Lebrón (Argentina) Leandro Augsburguer	12220
4	(Spain) Francisco Guerrero (Spain) Paquito Navarro	11320
5	(Spain) Coki Nieto (Spain) Jon Sanz	10704
6	(Argentina) Martín Di Nenno (Spain) Momo González	9400
7	(Brazil) Lucas Bergamini (Spain) Javi Garrido	7245
8	(Spain) Eduardo Alonso (Argentina) Juan Tello	6065
9	(Spain) Javi Leal (Spain) Pablo Cardona	5555
10	(Spain) Alejandro Ruiz (Spain) Juanlu Esbri	5025
11	(Spain) Alejandro Arroyo (Argentina) Leonel Aguirre	4595
12	(Argentina) Gonzalo Alfonso (Spain) Javier Barahona	4389
13	(Spain) Javier Garcia Mora (Spain) Jose Jimenez Casas	4145
14	(Spain) David Gala Sánchez (United Arab Emirates) Inigo Jofre	4000
15	(Argentina) Sanyo Gutiérrez (Spain) Victor Ruiz	3866
16	(Spain) Jose Garcia Diestro (Argentina) Maximiliano Sanchez Blasco	3424

Female

Rnk.	Team	FIP Ranking Points
1	(Argentina) Delfina Brea (Spain) Gemma Triay	34600
2	(Spain) Bea González (Spain) Paula Josemaria	27230
3	(Spain) Ariana Sánchez (Spain) Andrea Ustero	21325
4	(Spain) Claudia Fernandéz (Portugal) Sofia Araújo	19155
5	(Argentina) Claudia Jensen (Spain) Tamara Icardo	11775
6	(Spain) Marta Ortega (Spain) Martina Calvo	10765
7	(Spain) Alejandra Alonso (Spain) Alejandra Salazar	10000
8	(Spain) Marina Guinart (Spain) Veronica Virseda	8315
9	(Spain) Beatriz Caldera (Spain) Carmen Goenaga	7340
10	(Argentina) Aranzazu Osoro (Spain) Victoria Iglesias	7030
11	(Spain) Jessica Castelló (Spain) Lorena Rufo	4420
12	(Argentina) Julieta Bidahorria (Spain) Marta Caparros	3280
13	(Russia) Ksenia Sharifova (Spain) Marta Borrero	3252
14	(Spain) Agueda Perez (Spain) Lucia Martinez	3094
15	(France) Alix Collombon (Spain) Jana Montes	2813
16	(Italy) Giulia Dal Pozzo (Spain) Nuria Rodriguez	2662

== Head-to-head record between teams ranked in the top 4 during the season ==
=== Man's ===
Record	Coello–Tapia	Galán–Chingotto	Stupaczuk–Yanguas	Augsburger–Lebrón
Coello–Tapia	—	1–2	1–0	3–0
Galán–Chingotto	2–1	—	2–0	—
Stupaczuk–Yanguas	0–1	0–2	—	—
Augsburger–Lebrón	0–3	—	—	—

=== Women's ===
Record	D. Brea–Triay	B. González–Paula	Ariana–Ustero	Araúijo–C. Fernandez
D. Brea–Triay	—	1–2	1–1	2–0
B. González–Paula	2–1	—	2–2	—
Ariana–Ustero	1–1	2–2	—	—
Araúijo–C. Fernandez	0–2	—	—	—

== Draws ==
=== Men's Bracket ===
Round of 32
1	(Argentina) Chingotto / (Spain) Galán
Bye
19	(Spain) G. Rubio / (Spain) J. Ruiz	6	6
9	(Spain) J. Leal / (Spain) P. Cardona	4	3
Q	(Paraguay) M. Abud / (Argentina) M. Lamperti	3	2
21	(Argentina) M. Arce / (Spain) P. Lijó	6	6
13	(Spain) J.G. Mora / (Spain) J.J. Casas	3	6	6
6	(Argentina) Di Nenno / (Spain) Momo	6	2	3
5	(Spain) Coki / (Spain) J. Sanz	6	6
WC	(Egypt) A. Zaghloul / (Egypt) G. Wakim	1	1
10	(Spain) A. Ruiz / (Spain) J. Esbri	7	6
15	(Argentina) Sanyo / (Spain) V. Ruiz	5	4
12	(Argentina) G. Alfonso / (Spain) J. Barahona	6	4	6
LL	(Spain) J. Bautista / (Spain) T. Zapata	3	6	4
Bye
4	(Spain) F. Guerrero / (Spain) Paquito
3	(Spain) Lebrón / (Argentina) L. Augsburger
Bye
Q	(Italy) E. Jensen / (Spain) L.H. Quesada	7	6
20	(Spain) Á. Cepero / (Spain) P.G. Rodrigo	6	0
WC	(Egypt) M. Aboulkassem / (Egypt) M. El Garhy	1	2
22	(Spain) A. Goñi / (Spain) E. Goenaga	6	6
Q	(France) J. Bergeron / (France) T. Fonteny	1	7	1
8	(Spain) E. Alonso / (Argentina) J. Tello	6	5	6
7	(Spain) J. Garrido / (Brazil) L. Bergamini	6	6
Q	(Spain) A. Roglan / (Spain) F. Sotillo	0	1
17	(Spain) G. Collado / (Spain) P.H. Alvarez	2	6	6
11	(Spain) A. Arroyo / (Argentina) L. Aguirre	6	4	4
20	(Spain) D.G. Sánchez / (Spain) P.G. Rodrigo	6	2
16	(Spain) J.G. Diestro / (Argentina) M. Blasco	7	6
Bye
2	(Argentina) Stupaczuk / (Spain) M. Yanguas

Round of 16
1	(Argentina) Chingotto / (Spain) Galán	6	4	6
19	(Spain) G. Rubio / (Spain) J. Ruiz	3	6	1
21	(Argentina) M. Arce / (Spain) P. Lijó	5	6
13	(Spain) J.G. Mora / (Spain) J.J. Casas	7	7
5	(Spain) Coki / (Spain) J. Sanz	6	6
10	(Spain) A. Ruiz / (Spain) J. Esbri	2	2
12	(Argentina) G. Alfonso / (Spain) J. Barahona	5	5
4	(Spain) F. Guerrero / (Spain) Paquito	7	7
3	(Spain) Lebrón / (Argentina) L. Augsburger	6	6	0
Q	(Italy) E. Jensen / (Spain) L.H. Quesada	7	3	6
22	(Spain) A. Goñi / (Spain) E. Goenaga	6	6	2
8	(Spain) E. Alonso / (Argentina) J. Tello	7	1	6
7	(Spain) J. Garrido / (Brazil) L. Bergamini	7	5	6
17	(Spain) G. Collado / (Spain) P.H. Alvarez	5	7	2
16	(Spain) J.G. Diestro / (Argentina) M. Blasco	4	0
2	(Argentina) Stupaczuk / (Spain) M. Yanguas	6	6

Quarter-Final
1	(Argentina) Chingotto / (Spain) Galán	6	6
13	(Spain) J.G. Mora / (Spain) J.J. Casas	4	0
5	(Spain) Coki / (Spain) J. Sanz	6	7
4	(Spain) F. Guerrero / (Spain) Paquito	4	5
Q	(Italy) E. Jensen / (Spain) L.H. Quesada	4	6	4
8	(Spain) E. Alonso / (Argentina) J. Tello	6	2	6
7	(Spain) J. Garrido / (Brazil) L. Bergamini	6	3	1
2	(Argentina) Stupaczuk / (Spain) M. Yanguas	3	6	6

Semi-Finals
1	(Argentina) Chingotto / (Spain) Galán	6	6
4	(Spain) F. Guerrero / (Spain) Paquito	3	4
8	(Spain) E. Alonso / (Argentina) J. Tello	1	4
2	(Argentina) Stupaczuk / (Spain) M. Yanguas	6	6

Finals
1	(Argentina) Chingotto / (Spain) Galán	6	6
2	(Argentina) Stupaczuk / (Spain) M. Yanguas	4	1

=== Women's Bracket ===
Round of 32
1	(Argentina) D. Brea / (Spain) G. Triay
Bye
15	(France) A. Collombon / (Spain) J. Montes	6	4
18	(Spain) L. Arruabarrena / (Spain) M. Lobo	7	6
14	(Spain) A. Perez / (Spain) L. Martinez	7	2	1
16	(Italy) G. Dal Pozzo / (Spain) N. Rodriguez	6	6	6
Bye
8	(Spain) M. Guinart / (Spain) V. Virseda
6	(Spain) M. Ortega / (Spain) M. Calvo
Bye
13	(Russia) K. Sharifova / (Spain) M. Borrero	6	6
Q	(Spain) E. Bigas / (Spain) S. Lapuente	4	4
Q	(Argentina) D. Valenzuela / (Brazil) R. Piltcher	7	4	6
Q	(Spain) N. Diaz / (Germany) V. Kurz	6	6	3
Bye
4	(Spain) C. Fernández / (Portugal) S. Araújo
3	(Spain) A. Ustero / (Spain) A. Sánchez
Bye
17	(Spain) M. Talavan / (Spain) S. Saiz	6	6
WC	(Egypt) L. El Nimr / (Egypt) Mora Hakim
11	(Spain) J. Castelló / (Spain) L. Rufo	2	7	7
12	(Argentina) J. Bidahorria / (Spain) M. Caparros	6	5	6
Bye
5	(Argentina) C. Jensen / (Spain) T. Icardo
7	(Spain) A. Salazar / (Spain) A. Alonso
Bye
9	(Spain) B. Caldera / (Spain) C. Goenaga	6	6
19	(Italy) G. Marchetti / (France) L. Godallier	3	1
10	(Argentina) A. Osoro / (Spain) V. Iglesias	6	2	*
Q	(United Kingdom) C. Rose / (Spain) L. Perez	2	0
Bye
2	(Spain) B. González / (Spain) P. Josemaria

Round of 16
1	(Argentina) D. Brea / (Spain) G. Triay	6	6
18	(Spain) L. Arruabarrena / (Spain) M. Lobo	0	1
16	(Italy) G. Dal Pozzo / (Spain) N. Rodriguez	2	4
8	(Spain) M. Guinart / (Spain) V. Virseda	6	6
6	(Spain) M. Ortega / (Spain) M. Calvo	6	6
13	(Russia) K. Sharifova / (Spain) M. Borrero	3	2
Q	(Argentina) D. Valenzuela / (Brazil) R. Piltcher	3	3
4	(Spain) C. Fernández / (Portugal) S. Araújo	6	6
3	(Spain) A. Ustero / (Spain) A. Sánchez	6	6
17	(Spain) M. Talavan / (Spain) S. Saiz	1	2
11	(Spain) J. Castelló / (Spain) L. Rufo	0	3
5	(Argentina) C. Jensen / (Spain) T. Icardo	6	6
7	(Spain) A. Salazar / (Spain) A. Alonso	2	3
9	(Spain) B. Caldera / (Spain) C. Goenaga	6	6
10	(Argentina) A. Osoro / (Spain) V. Iglesias	5	7	2
2	(Spain) B. González / (Spain) P. Josemaria	7	5	6

Quarter-Final
1	(Argentina) D. Brea / (Spain) G. Triay	6	6
8	(Spain) M. Guinart / (Spain) V. Virseda	0	2
6	(Spain) M. Ortega / (Spain) M. Calvo	6	4	6
4	(Spain) C. Fernández / (Portugal) S. Araújo	0	6	2
3	(Spain) A. Ustero / (Spain) A. Sánchez	6	7
5	(Argentina) C. Jensen / (Spain) T. Icardo	1	6
9	(Spain) B. Caldera / (Spain) C. Goenaga	0	1
2	(Spain) B. González / (Spain) P. Josemaria	6	6

Semi-Finals
1	(Argentina) D. Brea / (Spain) G. Triay	6	6
6	(Spain) M. Ortega / (Spain) M. Calvo	0	3
3	(Spain) A. Ustero / (Spain) A. Sánchez	2	3
2	(Spain) B. González / (Spain) P. Josemaria	6	6

Finals
1	(Argentina) D. Brea / (Spain) G. Triay	4	7	4
2	(Spain) B. González / (Spain) P. Josemaria	6	5	6

== Results ==
=== Round of 32 ===
Men's

Date	Winners	Score	Opponent	Refs.
14/4/2026	(Spain) Gonzalo Rubio (Spain) Javi Ruiz	6–4 / 6–3	(Spain) Javi Leal (Spain) Pablo Cardona	
14/4/2026	(Argentina) Maximiliano Arce (Spain) Pablo Lijó	6–3 / 6–2	(Paraguay) Martin Abud (Argentina) Miguel Lamperti	
13/4/2026	(Spain) Javier Garcia Mora (Spain) Jose Jimenez Casas	3–6 / 6–2 / 6–3	(Argentina) Martin Di Nenno (Spain) Momo González	
14/4/2026	(Spain) Coki Nieto (Spain) Jon Sanz	6–1 / 6–1	(Egypt) Aly Zaghloul (Egypt) Georges Wakim	
14/4/2026	(Spain) Aléx Ruiz (Spain) Juanlu Esbri	7–5 / 6–4	(Argentina) Sanyo Gutiérrez (Spain) Victor Ruiz	
13/4/2026	(Argentina) Gonzalo Alfonso (Spain) Javier Barahona	6–3 / 4–6 / 6–4	(Spain) Jairo Bautista (Spain) Teodoro Zapata	
14/4/2026	(Italy) Enzo Jensen (Spain) Luis Hernandez Quesada	7–6 / 6–0	(Spain) David Gala Sánchez (Spain) Pablo García Rodrigo	
13/4/2026	(Spain) Aimar Goñi (Spain) Enrique Goenaga	6–1 / 6–2	(Egypt) Mohamed Aboulkassem (Egypt) Mohamed El Garhy	
14/4/2026	(Spain) Eduardo Alonso (Argentina) Juan Tello	6–1 / 5–7 / 6–1	(France) Johan Bergeron (France) Timeo Fonteny	
14/4/2026	(Spain) Javier Garrido (Brazil) Lucas Bergamini	6–0 / 6–1	(Spain) Albert Roglan Pons (Spain) Ferran Insa Sotillo	
14/4/2026	(Spain) Guillermo Collado (Spain) Pol Hernandez	2–6 / 6–4 / 6–4	(Spain) Alex Arroyo (Argentina) Leonel Aguirre	
13/4/2026	(Spain) Jose Garcia Diestro (Argentina) Maximiliano Sánchez Blasco	7–6 / 6–2	(Spain) David Gala Sánchez (United Arab Emirates) Iñigo Jofre	

Women's

Date	Winners	Score	Opponent	Refs.
14/4/2026	(Spain) Lara Arruabarrena (Spain) Marina Lobo	7–6 / 6–4	(France) Alix Collombon (Spain) Jana Montes	
14/4/2026	(Italy) Giulia Dal Pozzo (Spain) Nuria Rodriguez	6–7 / 6–2 / 6–1	(Spain) Agueda Perez (Spain) Lucia Martinez	
14/4/2026	(Russia) Ksenia Sharifova (Spain) Marta Borrero	6–4 / 6–4	(Spain) Eugenia Guimet Bigas (Spain) Sara Foguer Lapuente	
14/4/2026	(Argentina) Daiara Agustina Valenzuela (Brazil) Raquel Piltcher	7–6 / 4–6 / 6–3	(Spain) Natividad Lopez Diaz (Germany) Victoria Kurz	
14/4/2026	(Spain) Marta Talavan (Spain) Sofía Saiz Vallejo	6–2 / 6–2	(Egypt) Laila El Nimr (Egypt) Mora Hakim	
14/4/2026	(Spain) Jessica Castelló (Spain) Lorena Rufo	2–6 / 7–5 / 7–6	(Argentina) Julieta Bidahorria (Spain) Marta Caparros	
14/4/2026	(Spain) Beatriz Caldera (Spain) Carmen Goenaga	6–3 / 6–1	(Italy) Giorgia Marchetti (France) Lea Godallier	
14/4/2026	(Argentina) Aranzazu Osoro (Spain) Victoria Iglesias	6–2 / 2–0 / W.O.	(United Kingdom) Catherine Rose (Spain) Lucia Perez Parra	

=== Round of 16 ===
Men's

Date	Winners	Score	Opponent	Refs.
15/4/2026	(Spain) Alejandro Galán (Argentina) Federico Chingotto	6–3 / 4–6 / 6–1	(Spain) Gonzalo Rubio (Spain) Javi Ruiz	
15/4/2026	(Spain) Javier Garcia Mora (Spain) Jose Jimenez Casas	7–5 / 7–6	(Argentina) Maximiliano Arce (Spain) Pablo Lijó	
15/4/2026	(Spain) Coki Nieto (Spain) Jon Sanz	6–2 / 6–2	(Spain) Aléx Ruiz (Spain) Juanlu Esbri	
15/4/2026	(Spain) Francisco Guerrero (Spain) Paquito Navarro	7–5 / 7–5	(Argentina) Gonzalo Alfonso (Spain) Javier Barahona	
15/4/2026	(Italy) Enzo Jensen (Spain) Luis Hernandez Quesada	7–6 / 3–6 / 6–0	(Spain) Juan Lebrón (Argentina) Leandro Augsburger	
15/4/2026	(Spain) Eduardo Alonso (Argentina) Juan Tello	7–6 / 1–6 / 6–2	(Spain) Aimar Goñi (Spain) Enrique Goenaga	
15/4/2026	(Spain) Javier Garrido (Brazil) Lucas Bergamini	7–5 / 5–7 / 6–2	(Spain) Guillermo Collado (Spain) Pol Hernandez	
15/4/2026	(Argentina) Franco Stupaczuk (Spain) Miguel Yanguas	6–4 / 6–0	(Spain) Jose Garcia Diestro (Argentina) Maximiliano Sánchez Blasco	

Women's

Date	Winners	Score	Opponent	Refs.
15/4/2026	(Argentina) Delfina Brea (Spain) Gemma Triay	6–0 / 6–1	(Spain) Lara Arruabarrena (Spain) Marina Lobo	
15/4/2026	(Spain) Marina Guinart (Spain) Verónica Virseda	6–2 / 6–4	(Italy) Giulia Dal Pozzo (Spain) Nuria Rodriguez	
15/4/2026	(Spain) Marta Ortega (Spain) Martina Calvo	6–3 / 6–2	(Russia) Ksenia Sharifova (Spain) Marta Borrero	
15/4/2026	(Spain) Claudia Fernández (Portugal) Sofia Araújo	6–3 / 6–3	(Argentina) Daiara Agustina Valenzuela (Brazil) Raquel Piltcher	
15/4/2026	(Spain) Andrea Ustero (Spain) Ariana Sánchez	6–1 / 6–2	(Spain) Marta Talavan (Spain) Sofía Saiz Vallejo	
15/4/2026	(Argentina) Claudia Jensen (Spain) Tamara Icardo	6–0 / 6–3	(Spain) Jessica Castelló (Spain) Lorena Rufo	
15/4/2026	(Spain) Beatriz Caldera (Spain) Carmen Goenaga	6–2 / 6–3	(Spain) Alejandra Alonso (Spain) Alejandra Salazar	
15/4/2026	(Spain) Bea González (Spain) Paula Josemaría	7–5 / 5–7 / 6–2	(Argentina) Aranzazu Osoro (Spain) Victoria Iglesias	

=== Quarter-Finals ===
Men's

Date	Winners	Score	Opponent	Refs.
16/4/2026	(Spain) Alejandro Galán (Argentina) Federico Chingotto	6–4 / 6–0	(Spain) Javier Garcia Mora (Spain) Jose Jimenez Casas	
16/4/2026	(Spain) Coki Nieto (Spain) Jon Sanz	6–4 / 7–5	(Spain) Francisco Guerrero (Spain) Paquito Navarro	
16/4/2026	(Spain) Eduardo Alonso (Argentina) Juan Tello	6–4 / 2–6 / 6–4	(Italy) Enzo Jensen (Spain) Luis Hernandez Quesada	
16/4/2026	(Argentina) Franco Stupaczuk (Spain) Miguel Yanguas	3–6 / 6–3 / 6–1	(Spain) Javier Garrido (Brazil) Lucas Bergamini	

Women's

Date	Winners	Score	Opponent	Refs.
16/4/2026	(Argentina) Delfina Brea (Spain) Gemma Triay	6–0 / 6–2	(Spain) Marina Guinart (Spain) Verónica Virseda	
16/4/2026	(Spain) Marta Ortega (Spain) Martina Calvo	6–0 / 4–6 / 6–2	(Spain) Claudia Fernández (Portugal) Sofia Araújo	
16/4/2026	(Spain) Andrea Ustero (Spain) Ariana Sánchez	6–1 / 7–6	(Argentina) Claudia Jensen (Spain) Tamara Icardo	
16/4/2026	(Spain) Bea González (Spain) Paula Josemaría	6–0 / 6–1	(Spain) Beatriz Caldera (Spain) Carmen Goenaga	

=== Semi-Finals ===
Men's

Date	Winners	Score	Opponent	Refs.
17/4/2026	(Spain) Alejandro Galán (Argentina) Federico Chingotto	6–3 / 6–4	(Spain) Coki Nieto (Spain) Jon Sanz	
17/4/2026	(Argentina) Franco Stupaczuk (Spain) Miguel Yanguas	6–1 / 6–4	(Spain) Eduardo Alonso (Argentina) Juan Tello	

Women's

Date	Winners	Score	Opponent	Refs.
17/4/2026	(Argentina) Delfina Brea (Spain) Gemma Triay	6–0 / 6–3	(Spain) Marta Ortega (Spain) Martina Calvo	
17/4/2026	(Spain) Bea González (Spain) Paula Josemaría	6–2 / 6–3	(Spain) Andrea Ustero (Spain) Ariana Sánchez	

=== Finals ===
Men's

Date	Winners	Score	Opponent	Refs.
18/4/2026	(Spain) Alejandro Galán (Argentina) Federico Chingotto	6–4 / 6–1	(Argentina) Franco Stupaczuk (Spain) Miguel Yanguas	

Women's

Date	Winners	Score	Opponent	Refs.
18/4/2026	(Spain) Bea González (Spain) Paula Josemaría	6–4 / 5–7 / 6–4	(Argentina) Delfina Brea (Spain) Gemma Triay	
