= 2026 Rotterdam P2 =

Premier Padel tournament held in Rotterdam

- Date: 27 September – 4 October
- Edition: P2
- Category: 3rd (Note: The two previous editions of the tournament were P1 events.)
- Prize money: €264.534
- Location: Rotterdam, Netherlands
- Venue: Rotterdam Ahoy
- Court speed: Slow

Champions
- Men's doubles: (Argentina) Agustín Tapia (Spain) Arturo Coello
- Women's doubles: (Spain) Andrea Ustero (Spain) Ariana Sánchez

Chronology

The 2026 Rotterdam P2 (officially 2026 Premier Padel Cupra Rotterdam P2) is the eighteenth tournament of the fifth season organized by Premier Padel, the premier padel circuit, promoted by the International Padel Federation, and with the financial backing of Nasser Al-Khelaïfi's Qatar Sports Investments.

In the women's category, for the second time this season, the second and third-ranked pairs in the FIP rankings reached the finals. In the title match, Andrea Ustero and Ariana Sánchez, the world's third-ranked pair, defeated Bea Gonzalez and Paula Josemaria, avenging their loss in the Valladolid final and securing their second consecutive title and fourth of the season. This marked their first victory together in Rotterdam (Ustero's first and Ariana's second, having previously won in 2024).

In the men's category, for the third time in the last five tournaments, a pair ranked outside the top three eliminated one of the top two ranked pairs to reach the final. In the decisive match, defending champions Agustín Tapia and Arturo Coello easily defeated Franco Stupaczuk and Jon Sanz, claiming their tenth title of 2026 and becoming champions in Rotterdam for the third consecutive year.

== Relevant Data ==
=== 100th final for Ariana ===
With the semifinal victory of Ariana Sánchez and Andrea Ustero over world number ones Delfina Brea and Gemma Triay, Ariana reached the 100th final of her professional career.

== Seeds ==
Male

Rnk.	Team	FIP Ranking Points
1	(Argentina) Agustín Tapia (Spain) Arturo Coello	40908
2	(Spain) Alejandro Galán (Argentina) Federico Chingotto	36578
3	(Spain) Juan Lebrón (Argentina) Leandro Augsburguer	15399
4	(Argentina) Martín Di Nenno (Spain) Paquito Navarro	11346
5	(Argentina) Franco Stupaczuk (Spain) Jon Sanz	11269
6	(Spain) Coki Nieto (Spain) Mike Yanguas	10834
7	(Spain) Francisco Guerrero (Spain) Javi Leal	8356
8	(Brazil) Lucas Campagnolo (Spain) Momo González	8048
9	(Argentina) Juan Tello (Argentina) Maximiliano Arce	5510
10	(Spain) Aimar Goñi (Spain) Eduardo Alonso	5359
11	(Argentina) Gonzalo Alfonso (Argentina) Valentino Libaak	4484
12	(Argentina) Leonel Aguirre (Spain) Pablo Garcia Rodrigo	3693
13	(Spain) David Gala Sánchez (Italy) Enzo Jensen	3470
14	(Spain) Enrique Goenaga (Spain) Guillermo Collado	2840
15	(Spain) Manuel Castaño (Spain) Pol Hernandez Álvarez	2811
16	(Spain) Jose Garcia Diestro (Spain) Marc Sintes	2626

Female

Rnk.	Team	FIP Ranking Points
1	(Argentina) Delfina Brea (Spain) Gemma Triay	33948
2	(Spain) Bea González (Spain) Paula Josemaria	27906
3	(Spain) Ariana Sánchez (Spain) Andrea Ustero	24553
4	(Spain) Claudia Fernandéz (Spain) Martina Calvo	19301
5	(Spain) Marta Ortega (Portugal) Sofia Araújo	12148
6	(Spain) Alejandra Alonso (Spain) Marina Guinart	9008
7	(Spain) Alejandra Salazar (Argentina) Aranzazu Osoro	7939
8	(Spain) Claudia Escacena (Argentina) Claudia Jensen	6666
9	(Spain) Beatriz Caldera (Spain) Carmen Goenaga	6078
10	(Spain) Lorena Rufo (Spain) Victoria Iglesias	5076
11	(Spain) Jana Montes (Spain) Marta Barrera	4134
12	(Spain) Lucía Sainz (Spain) Sofia Saiz	3911
13	(Spain) Jessica Castelló (Spain) Marta Talavan	3866
14	(Spain) Maria Rodriguez Abajo (Spain) Noa Canovas	3784
15	(France) Alix Collombon (Russia) Ksenia Sharifova	2878
16	(Spain) Águeda Perez (Spain) Marta Caparros	2816

== Head-to-head record between teams ranked in the top 4 during the season ==
=== Men's ===
Record	Coello–Tapia	Galán–Chingotto	Augsburger–Lebrón	Di Nenno–Paquito	Former Pairs	Stupaczuk–Yanguas
Coello–Tapia	—	7–4	7–1	2–0		5–0
Galán–Chingotto	4–7	—	4–2	3–0		3–0
Augsburger–Lebrón	1–7	2–4	—	0–1		—
Di Nenno–Paquito	0–2	0–3	1–0	—		1–2
Former Pairs						
Stupaczuk–Yanguas	0–5	0–3	—	2–1		—

=== Women's ===
Record	D. Brea–Triay	B. González–Paula	Ariana–Ustero	C. Fernández–M. Calvo	Former Pairs	Araúijo–C. Fernández
D. Brea–Triay	—	3–5	6–4	1–2		3–0
B. González–Paula	5–3	—	4–4	2–2		2–0
Ariana–Ustero	4–6	4–4	—	1–0		1–0
C. Fernández–M. Calvo	2–1	2–2	0–1	—		—
Former Pairs
Araúijo–C. Fernández	0–3	0–2	0–1	—		—

== Draws ==
=== Men's Bracket ===
Round of 32
1	(Spain) Coello / (Argentina) Tapia
Bye
10	(Spain) A. Goñi / (Spain) E. Alonso	6	3
20	(Italy) A. Montiel / (Spain) D. Santigosa	7	6
18	(Spain) A.R. Martinez / (Italy) F. Abbate	3	5
11	(Argentina) G. Alfonso / (Argentina) V. Libaak	6	7
14	(Spain) E. Goenaga / (Spain) G. Collado	1	6	5
7	(Spain) F. Guerrero / (Spain) J. Leal	6	2	7
8	(Brazil) L. Campagnolo / (Spain) Momo	6	6
17	(Spain) J. Martinez / (Spain) L.H. Quesada	4	3
16	(Spain) J.G. Diestro / (Spain) M. Sintes	6	6	6
Q	(Spain) A. Roglan / (Spain) M. Aragon	3	7	2
Q	(Spain) N. Moragues / (France) T. Fonteny	6	4
Q	(Spain) A. Naranjo / (Spain) T. Zapata	7	6
Bye
4	(Argentina) Di Nenno / (Spain) Paquito
3	(Spain) Lebrón / (Argentina) L. Augsburger
Bye
12	(Argentina) L. Aguirre / (Spain) P.G. Rodrigo	6	5
9	(Argentina) J. Tello / (Argentina) M. Arce	7	7
19	(Spain) F. Gil / (Spain) P. Lijó	7	6
21	(Argentina) F. Mouriño / (Spain) M. Quilez	5	3
22	(Spain) A.F. Lancha / (Spain) G. Rubio	6	2
6	(Spain) Coki / (Spain) M. Yanguas	7	6
5	(Argentina) F. Stupaczuk / (Spain) J. Sanz	6	6
Q	(Sweden) A. Axelsson / (Spain) M. Ortega	2	2
15	(Spain) M. Castaño / (Spain) P.H Álvarez	6	6
WC	(Netherlands) J. Prins / (Netherlands) Y. De Kroon	4	2
WC	(Sweden) A. Olsson / (Netherlands) S. Richters	0	4
13	(Spain) D.G. Sánchez / (Italy) E. Jensen	6	6
Bye
2	(Argentina) Chingotto / (Spain) Galán

Round of 16
1	(Spain) Coello / (Argentina) Tapia	6	6
20	(Italy) A. Montiel / (Spain) D. Santigosa	3	2
11	(Argentina) G. Alfonso / (Argentina) V. Libaak	7	3	6
7	(Spain) F. Guerrero / (Spain) J. Leal	5	6	4
8	(Brazil) L. Campagnolo / (Spain) Momo	6	7
16	(Spain) J.G. Diestro / (Spain) M. Sintes	4	5
Q	(Spain) A. Naranjo / (Spain) T. Zapata	0	3
4	(Argentina) Di Nenno / (Spain) Paquito	6	6
3	(Spain) Lebrón / (Argentina) L. Augsburger	6	7
9	(Argentina) J. Tello / (Argentina) M. Arce	1	6
19	(Spain) F. Gil / (Spain) P. Lijó	6	4
6	(Spain) Coki / (Spain) M. Yanguas	7	6
5	(Argentina) F. Stupaczuk / (Spain) J. Sanz	6	6
15	(Spain) M. Castaño / (Spain) P.H Álvarez	2	2
13	(Spain) D.G. Sánchez / (Italy) E. Jensen	0	2
2	(Argentina) Chingotto / (Spain) Galán	6	6

Quarter-Final
1	(Spain) Coello / (Argentina) Tapia	4	6	6
11	(Argentina) G. Alfonso / (Argentina) V. Libaak	6	3	3
8	(Brazil) L. Campagnolo / (Spain) Momo	2	7	7
4	(Argentina) Di Nenno / (Spain) Paquito	6	6	5
3	(Spain) Lebrón / (Argentina) L. Augsburger	6	3
6	(Spain) Coki / (Spain) M. Yanguas	7	6
5	(Argentina) F. Stupaczuk / (Spain) J. Sanz	6	6
2	(Argentina) Chingotto / (Spain) Galán	4	4

Semi-Finals
1	(Spain) Coello / (Argentina) Tapia	6	3	6
8	(Brazil) L. Campagnolo / (Spain) Momo	1	6	1
6	(Spain) Coki / (Spain) M. Yanguas	0	4
5	(Argentina) F. Stupaczuk / (Spain) J. Sanz	6	6

Finals
1	(Spain) Coello / (Argentina) Tapia	6	6
5	(Argentina) F. Stupaczuk / (Spain) J. Sanz	3	2

=== Women's Bracket ===
Round of 32
1	(Argentina) D. Brea / (Spain) G. Triay
Bye
WC	(Netherlands) M. Koek / (Netherlands) S. Weterings	1	2
13	(Spain) J. Castelló / (Spain) M. Talavan	6	6
11	(Spain) J. Montes / (Spain) M. Barrera	2	6	7
Q	(Spain) A. Lopez / (Spain) C. Goyeneche	6	4	6
Bye
7	(Spain) A. Salazar / (Argentina) A. Osoro
6	(Spain) A. Alonso / (Spain) M. Guinart
Bye
17	(Argentina) J. Bidahorria / (Argentina) V. Riera	6	6
19	(Italy) G. Marchetti / (Spain) L. Arruabarrena	4	2
12	(Spain) L. Sainz / (Spain) S. Saiz	2	6	6
Q	(Spain) A. Martinez / (Spain) N. Lopez	6	3	2
Bye
3	(Spain) A. Ustero / (Spain) A. Sánchez
4	(Spain) C. Fernández / (Spain) M. Calvo
Bye
9	(Spain) B. Caldera / (Spain) C. Goenaga	6	6
Q	(Spain) M. Borrero / (Spain) T. Navarro	4	3
14	(Spain) M.R. Abajo / (Spain) N. Canovas	5	6	6
10	(Spain) L. Rufo / (Spain) V. Iglesias	7	0	7
Bye
8	(Spain) C. Escacena / (Argentina) C. Jensen
5	(Spain) M. Ortega / (Portugal) S. Araújo
Bye
18	(Argentina) D. Valenzuela / (France) L. Godallier	6	6
16	(Spain) A. Perez / (Spain) M. Caparros	1	3
15	(France) A. Collombon / (Russia) K. Sharifova	6	6
Q	(Spain) A. Gracia / (Spain) S. Bellver	4	3
Bye
2	(Spain) B. González / (Spain) P. Josemaria

Round of 16
1	(Argentina) D. Brea / (Spain) G. Triay	6	6
13	(Spain) J. Castelló / (Spain) M. Talavan	1	3
11	(Spain) J. Montes / (Spain) M. Barrera	5	7	1
7	(Spain) A. Salazar / (Argentina) A. Osoro	7	5	6
6	(Spain) A. Alonso / (Spain) M. Guinart	3	7	3
17	(Argentina) J. Bidahorria / (Argentina) V. Riera	6	6	6
12	(Spain) L. Sainz / (Spain) S. Saiz
3	(Spain) A. Ustero / (Spain) A. Sánchez	*
4	(Spain) C. Fernández / (Spain) M. Calvo	3	*
9	(Spain) B. Caldera / (Spain) C. Goenaga	0
10	(Spain) L. Rufo / (Spain) V. Iglesias	4	5
8	(Spain) C. Escacena / (Argentina) C. Jensen	6	7
5	(Spain) M. Ortega / (Portugal) S. Araújo	6	7
18	(Argentina) D. Valenzuela / (France) L. Godallier	3	5
15	(France) A. Collombon / (Russia) K. Sharifova	4	2
2	(Spain) B. González / (Spain) P. Josemaria	6	6

Quarter-Final
1	(Argentina) D. Brea / (Spain) G. Triay	6	6
7	(Spain) A. Salazar / (Argentina) A. Osoro	0	4
17	(Argentina) J. Bidahorria / (Argentina) V. Riera	3	2
3	(Spain) A. Ustero / (Spain) A. Sánchez	6	6
4	(Spain) C. Fernández / (Spain) M. Calvo	6	7
8	(Spain) C. Escacena / (Argentina) C. Jensen	3	5
5	(Spain) M. Ortega / (Portugal) S. Araújo	6	3	2
2	(Spain) B. González / (Spain) P. Josemaria	4	6	6

Semi-Finals
1	(Argentina) D. Brea / (Spain) G. Triay	2	3
3	(Spain) A. Ustero / (Spain) A. Sánchez	6	6
4	(Spain) C. Fernández / (Spain) M. Calvo	3	4
2	(Spain) B. González / (Spain) P. Josemaria	6	6

Finals
3	(Spain) A. Ustero / (Spain) A. Sánchez	6	6
2	(Spain) B. González / (Spain) P. Josemaria	4	4

== Results ==
=== Round of 32 ===
Men's

Date	Winner	Score	Opponent	Refs.
29/9/2026	(Italy) Alvaro Montiel (Spain) Daniel Santigosa	7–6 / 6–3	(Spain) Aimar Goñi (Spain) Eduardo Alonso	
29/9/2026	(Argentina) Gonzalo Alfonso (Argentina) Valentino Libaak	6–3 / 7–5	(Spain) Alonso Rodriguez Martinez (Italy) Flavio Abbate	
30/9/2026	(Spain) Francisco Guerrero (Spain) Javi Leal	6–1 / 2–6 / 7–5	(Spain) Enrique Goenaga (Spain) Guillermo Collado	
30/9/2026	(Brazil) Lucas Campagnolo (Spain) Momo González	6–4 / 6–3	(Spain) Javier Martinez (Spain) Luis Hernandez Quesada	
30/9/2026	(Spain) Jose Garcia Diestro (Spain) Marc Sintes	6–3 / 6–7 / 6–2	(Spain) Albert Roglan Pons (Spain) Manuel Aragon Herrera	
30/9/2026	(Spain) Adrian Naranjo Martinez (Spain) Teodoro Zapata	7–6 / 6–4	(Spain) Nacho Moragues Moltò (France) Timeo Fonteny	
29/9/2026	(Argentina) Juan Tello (Argentina) Maximiliano Arce	7–6 / 7–5	(Argentina) Leonel Aguirre (Spain) Pablo Garcia Rodrigo	
29/9/2026	(Spain) Francisco Gil Morales (Spain) Pablo Lijó	7–5 / 6–3	(Argentina) Federico Mourino (Spain) Marc Quilez	
30/9/2026	(Spain) Coki Nieto (Spain) Mike Yanguas	7–6 / 6–2	(Spain) Andres Fernandez Lancha (Spain) Gonzalo Rubio	
30/9/2026	(Argentina) Franco Stupaczuk (Spain) Jon Sanz	6–2 / 6–2	(Sweden) Adam Axelsson (Spain) Mario Ortega	
30/9/2026	(Spain) Manuel Castaño (Spain) Pol Hernandez Alvarez	6–4 / 6–2	(Netherlands) Julian Prins (Netherlands) Youp De Kroon	
30/9/2026	(Spain) David Gala Sánchez (Italy) Enzo Jensen	6–0 / 6–4	(Sweden) Albin Olsson (Netherlands) Sten Richters	

Women's

Date	Winner	Score	Opponent	Refs.
30/9/2026	(Spain) Jessica Castelló (Spain) Marta Talavan	6–1 / 6–2	(Netherlands) Marcella Koek (Netherlands) Stephanie Weterings	
30/9/2026	(Spain) Jana Montes (Spain) Marta Barrera	2–6 / 6–4 / 7–6	(Spain) Amanda Lopez Moral (Spain) Camila Fassio Goyeneche	
30/9/2026	(Argentina) Julieta Bidahorria (Argentina) Virginia Riera	6–4 / 6–2	(Italy) Giorgia Marchetti (Spain) Lara Arruabarrena	
30/9/2026	(Spain) Lucía Sainz (Spain) Sofia Saiz	2–6 / 6–3 / 6–2	(Spain) Aida Martinez Sanjuan (Spain) Natividad Lopez Diaz	
30/9/2026	(Spain) Beatriz Caldera (Spain) Carmen Goenaga	6–4 / 6–3	(Spain) Marta Borrero (Spain) Teresa Navarro	
30/9/2026	(Spain) Lorena Rufo (Spain) Victoria Iglesias	7–5 / 0–6 / 7–6	(Spain) Maria Rodriguez Abajo (Spain) Noa Canovas	
30/9/2026	(Argentina) Daiara Valenzuela (France) Lea Godallier	6–1 / 6–3	(Spain) Agueda Perez (Spain) Marta Caparros	
30/9/2026	(France) Alix Collombon (Russia) Ksenia Sharifova	6–4 / 6–3	(Spain) Ana Dominguez Gracia (Spain) Sandra Bellver	

=== Round of 16 ===
Men's

Date	Winner	Score	Opponent	Refs.
1/10/2026	(Argentina) Agustín Tapia (Spain) Arturo Coello	6–3 / 6–2	(Italy) Alvaro Montiel (Spain) Daniel Santigosa	
1/10/2026	(Argentina) Gonzalo Alfonso (Argentina) Valentino Libaak	7–5 / 3–6 / 6–4	(Spain) Francisco Guerrero (Spain) Javi Leal	
1/10/2026	(Brazil) Lucas Campagnolo (Spain) Momo González	6–4 / 7–5	(Spain) Jose Garcia Diestro (Spain) Marc Sintes	
1/10/2026	(Argentina) Martin Di Nenno (Spain) Paquito Navarro	6–0 / 6–3	(Spain) Adrian Naranjo Martinez (Spain) Teodoro Zapata	
1/10/2026	(Spain) Juan Lebrón (Argentina) Leandro Augsburger	6–1 / 7–6	(Argentina) Juan Tello (Argentina) Maximiliano Arce	
1/10/2026	(Spain) Coki Nieto (Spain) Mike Yanguas	7–6 / 6–4	(Spain) Francisco Gil Morales (Spain) Pablo Lijó	
1/10/2026	(Argentina) Franco Stupaczuk (Spain) Jon Sanz	6–2 / 6–2	(Spain) Manuel Castaño (Spain) Pol Hernandez Alvarez	
1/10/2026	(Spain) Alejandro Galán (Argentina) Federico Chingotto	6–0 / 6–2	(Spain) David Gala Sánchez (Italy) Enzo Jensen	

Women's

Date	Winner	Score	Opponent	Refs.
1/10/2026	(Argentina) Delfina Brea (Spain) Gemma Triay	6–1 / 6–3	(Spain) Jessica Castelló (Spain) Marta Talavan	
1/10/2026	(Spain) Alejandra Salazar (Argentina) Aranzazu Osoro	7–5 / 5–7 / 6–1	(Spain) Jana Montes (Spain) Marta Barrera	
1/10/2026	(Argentina) Julieta Bidahorria (Argentina) Virginia Riera	6–3 / 6–7 / 6–3	(Spain) Alejandra Alonso (Spain) Marina Guinart	
1/10/2026	(Spain) Andrea Ustero (Spain) Ariana Sánchez	W.O.	(Spain) Lucía Sainz (Spain) Sofia Saiz	
1/10/2026	(Spain) Claudia Fernández (Spain) Martina Calvo	3–0 / W.O.	(Spain) Beatriz Caldera (Spain) Carmen Goenaga	
1/10/2026	(Spain) Claudia Escacena (Argentina) Claudia Jensen	6–4 / 7–5	(Spain) Lorena Rufo (Spain) Victoria Iglesias	
1/10/2026	(Spain) Marta Ortega (Portugal) Sofia Araújo	6–3 / 7–5	(Argentina) Daiara Valenzuela (France) Lea Godallier	
1/10/2026	(Spain) Bea González (Spain) Paula Josemaría	6–4 / 6–2	(France) Alix Collombon (Russia) Ksenia Sharifova	

=== Quarter-Finals ===
Men's

Date	Winner	Score	Opponent	Refs.
2/10/2026	(Argentina) Agustín Tapia (Spain) Arturo Coello	4–6 / 6–3 / 6–3	(Argentina) Gonzalo Alfonso (Argentina) Valentino Libaak	
2/10/2026	(Brazil) Lucas Campagnolo (Spain) Momo González	2–6 / 7–6 / 7–5	(Argentina) Martin Di Nenno (Spain) Paquito Navarro	
2/10/2026	(Spain) Coki Nieto (Spain) Mike Yanguas	7–6 / 6–3	(Spain) Juan Lebrón (Argentina) Leandro Augsburger	
2/10/2026	(Argentina) Franco Stupaczuk (Spain) Jon Sanz	6–4 / 6–4	(Spain) Alejandro Galán (Argentina) Federico Chingotto	

Women's

Date	Winner	Score	Opponent	Refs.
2/10/2026	(Argentina) Delfina Brea (Spain) Gemma Triay	6–0 / 6–4	(Spain) Alejandra Salazar (Argentina) Aranzazu Osoro	
2/10/2026	(Spain) Andrea Ustero (Spain) Ariana Sánchez	6–3 / 6–2	(Argentina) Julieta Bidahorria (Argentina) Virginia Riera	
2/10/2026	(Spain) Claudia Fernández (Spain) Martina Calvo	6–3 / 7–5	(Spain) Claudia Escacena (Argentina) Claudia Jensen	
2/10/2026	(Spain) Bea González (Spain) Paula Josemaría	4–6 / 6–3 / 6–2	(Spain) Marta Ortega (Portugal) Sofia Araújo	

=== Semi-Finals ===
Men's

Date	Winner	Score	Opponent	Refs.
3/10/2026	(Argentina) Agustín Tapia (Spain) Arturo Coello	6–1 / 3–6 / 6–1	(Brazil) Lucas Campagnolo (Spain) Momo González	
3/10/2026	(Argentina) Franco Stupaczuk (Spain) Jon Sanz	6–0 / 6–4	(Spain) Coki Nieto (Spain) Mike Yanguas	

Women's

Date	Winner	Score	Opponent	Refs.
3/10/2026	(Spain) Andrea Ustero (Spain) Ariana Sánchez	6–2 / 6–3	(Argentina) Delfina Brea (Spain) Gemma Triay	
3/10/2026	(Spain) Bea González (Spain) Paula Josemaría	6–3 / 6–4	(Spain) Claudia Fernández (Spain) Martina Calvo	

=== Finals ===
Men's

Date	Winners	Score	Opponent	Refs.
4/10/2026	(Argentina) Agustín Tapia (Spain) Arturo Coello	6–3 / 6–2	(Argentina) Franco Stupaczuk (Spain) Jon Sanz	

Women's

Date	Winner	Score	Opponent	Refs.
4/10/2026	(Spain) Andrea Ustero (Spain) Ariana Sánchez	6–4 / 6–4	(Spain) Bea González (Spain) Paula Josemaría	
