= 2026 Asunción P2 =

Premier Padel tournament held in Asunción

- Date: 3 – 10 May
- Edition: 3rd
- Category: P2
- Prize money: €264.534
- Location: Asunción, Paraguay
- Venue: SND Arena
- Court speed: Fast

Champions
- Men's doubles: (Spain) Alejandro Galán (Argentina) Federico Chingotto
- Women's doubles: (Spain) Bea González (Spain) Paula Josemaría

Chronology

The 2026 Asunción P2 (officially 2026 Premier Padel Ueno Bank Asunción P2) was the seventh tournament of the fifth season organized by Premier Padel, the premier padel circuit, promoted by the International Padel Federation, and with the financial backing of Nasser Al-Khelaïfi's Qatar Sports Investments.

In the women's category, the two highest-ranked pairs on the FIP rankings reached the final, facing each other in a final for the fifth consecutive time. In the decisive match, Bea González and Paula Josemaría defeated Delfina Brea and Gemma Triay for the fourth time in a row, claiming their fourth title of 2026.

In the men's category, the two highest-ranked pairs on the FIP tour both reached the finals for the fourth time. In the title match, Alejandro Galán and Federico Chingotto defeated Agustín Tapia and Arturo Coello for the third time in a final this year, securing their fourth title of 2026.

== Relevant Data ==
=== Coello and Tapia match the record set by Belasteguín and Juan Martín Díaz ===
By reaching the final of the Paraguay P2, Agustín Tapia and Arturo Coello have made it to 21 consecutive finals, completing a full year without missing a single championship match. With this milestone, the "Golden Boys" equal the record set by Fernando Belasteguín and Juan Martín Díaz, the only other pair to achieve such a feat.

=== Paula Josemaría wins her 50th title ===
After winning another title alongside Bea González in Asunción, Paula Josemaría reached the 50-title mark in her career, an achievement she accomplished while still under the age of 30. Having reached 50 titles, she is now close to her former partner Ariana Sánchez (54) and Gemma Triay (54), and sits just eight titles behind the all-time leader, Alejandra Salazar, who holds 58.

== Seeds ==
Male

Rnk.	Team	FIP Ranking Points
1	(Argentina) Agustín Tapia (Spain) Arturo Coello	41340
2	(Spain) Alejandro Galán (Argentina) Federico Chingotto	35160
3	(Argentina) Franco Stupaczuk (Spain) Mike Yanguas	13290
4	(Spain) Juan Lebrón (Argentina) Leandro Augsburguer	13285
5	(Spain) Francisco Guerrero (Spain) Paquito Navarro	11320
6	(Spain) Coki Nieto (Spain) Jon Sanz	10997
7	(Argentina) Martín Di Nenno (Spain) Momo González	9310
8	(Brazil) Lucas Bergamini (Spain) Javi Garrido	7220
9	(Spain) Alejandro Ruiz (Spain) Juanlu Esbri	4980
10	(Argentina) Eduardo Agustín Torre (Spain) Javi Leal	4889
11	(Spain) Jairo Bautista (Brazil) Lucas Campagnolo	4712
12	(Spain) Alejandro Arroyo (Argentina) Leonel Aguirre	4615
13	(Spain) Aimar Goñi (Spain) Eduardo Alonso	4514
14	(Argentina) Gonzalo Alfonso (Spain) Javier Barahona	4354
15	(Argentina) Juan Tello (Spain) Maximiliano Arce	4334
16	(Spain) David Gala Sánchez (United Arab Emirates) Inigo Jofre	3972

Female

Rnk.	Team	FIP Ranking Points
1	(Argentina) Delfina Brea (Spain) Gemma Triay	35320
2	(Spain) Bea González (Spain) Paula Josemaria	28670
3	(Spain) Ariana Sánchez (Spain) Andrea Ustero	21040
4	(Spain) Claudia Fernandéz (Portugal) Sofia Araújo	19380
5	(Argentina) Claudia Jensen (Spain) Tamara Icardo	11955
6	(Spain) Marta Ortega (Spain) Martina Calvo	11015
7	(Spain) Alejandra Alonso (Spain) Alejandra Salazar	9910
8	(Spain) Marina Guinart (Spain) Veronica Virseda	8265
9	(Spain) Beatriz Caldera (Spain) Carmen Goenaga	7430
10	(Argentina) Aranzazu Osoro (Spain) Victoria Iglesias	7030
11	(Spain) Araceli Martinez (Spain) Lucía Sainz	4740
12	(Spain) Jessica Castelló (Spain) Lorena Rufo	4510
13	(Argentina) Julieta Bidahorria (Spain) Marta Caparros	3257
14	(Spain) Agueda Perez (Spain) Lucia Martinez	3074
15	(Spain) Maria Rodriguez Abajo (Spain) Marta Borrero	3007
16	(Spain) Teresa Navarro (Argentina) Virginia Riera	3004

== Head-to-head record between teams ranked in the top 4 during the season ==
=== Man's ===
Record	Coello–Tapia	Galán–Chingotto	Stupaczuk–Yanguas	Augsburger–Lebrón
Coello–Tapia	—	1–3	2–0	4–1
Galán–Chingotto	3–1	—	2–0	0–1
Stupaczuk–Yanguas	0–2	0–2	—	—
Augsburger–Lebrón	1–4	1–0	—	—

=== Women's ===
Record	D. Brea–Triay	B. González–Paula	Ariana–Ustero	Araúijo–C. Fernandez
D. Brea–Triay	—	1–4	2–1	2–0
B. González–Paula	4–1	—	2–2	2–0
Ariana–Ustero	1–2	2–2	—	—
Araúijo–C. Fernandez	0–2	0–2	—	—

== Draws ==
=== Men's Bracket ===
Round of 32
1	(Spain) Coello / (Argentina) Tapia
Bye
11	(Spain) J. Bautista / (Brazil) L. Campagnolo	6	6
Q	(Chile) J. Valdes / (Argentina) R. Nuñez	2	1
LL	(Argentina) E. Torre / (Spain) J. Leal	7	4	6
18	(Argentina) A. Chozas / (Argentina) V. Libaak	5	6	7
22	(Italy) D. Perino / (Spain) P. Fernandez	3	3
6	(Spain) Coki / (Spain) J. Sanz	6	6
8	(Spain) J. Garrido / (Brazil) L. Bergamini	5	6	6
14	(Argentina) G. Alfonso / (Spain) J. Barahona	7	4	2
Q	(Spain) A. Martinez / (Argentina) J. De Pascual	6	6	7
20	(Spain) G. Collado / (Spain) P.H. Alvarez	7	4	6
17	(Argentina) Sanyo / (Spain) V. Ruiz	2	7	2
Q	(Argentina) F. Mouriño / (Spain) M. Quilez	6	5	6
Bye
4	(Spain) Lebrón / (Argentina) L. Augsburger
3	(Argentina) Stupaczuk / (Spain) Yanguas
Bye
WC	(Paraguay) F. Dehnike / (Spain) M. Font
19	(Spain) J.G. Diestro / (Argentina) M. Blasco	6	6
9	(Spain) A. Ruiz / (Spain) J. Esbri	3	4
13	(Spain) A. Goñi / (Spain) E. Alonso	6	6
12	(Spain) A. Arroyo / (Argentina) L. Aguirre	3	4
7	(Argentina) Di Nenno / (Spain) Momo	6	6
5	(Spain) F. Guerrero / (Spain) Paquito	4	6
15	(Argentina) J. Tello / (Argentina) M. Arce	6	7
WC	(Paraguay) M. Abud / (Argentina) M. Lamperti	3	2
21	(Spain) P.G. Rodrigo / (Spain) P. Lijó	6	6
16	(Spain) D. Sánchez / (United Arab Emirates) I. Jofre	6	7
Q	(Argentina) A. Graupera / (Argentina) M. Kloster	2	6
Bye
2	(Argentina) Chingotto / (Spain) Galán

Round of 16
1	(Spain) Coello / (Argentina) Tapia	6	6
11	(Spain) J. Bautista / (Brazil) L. Campagnolo	4	4
18	(Argentina) A. Chozas / (Argentina) V. Libaak	6	6	6
6	(Spain) Coki / (Spain) J. Sanz	3	7	7
8	(Spain) J. Garrido / (Brazil) L. Bergamini	5	3
Q	(Spain) A. Martinez / (Argentina) J. De Pascual	7	6
Q	(Argentina) F. Mouriño / (Spain) M. Quilez	2	2
4	(Spain) Lebrón / (Argentina) L. Augsburger	6	6
3	(Argentina) Stupaczuk / (Spain) Yanguas	6	7
19	(Spain) J.G. Diestro / (Argentina) M. Blasco	2	6
13	(Spain) A. Goñi / (Spain) E. Alonso	6	6
7	(Argentina) Di Nenno / (Spain) Momo	3	4
15	(Argentina) J. Tello / (Argentina) M. Arce	4	6	6
21	(Spain) P.G. Rodrigo / (Spain) P. Lijó	6	3	3
16	(Spain) D. Sánchez / (United Arab Emirates) I. Jofre	6	4
2	(Argentina) Chingotto / (Spain) Galán	7	6

Quarter-Final
1	(Spain) Coello / (Argentina) Tapia	6	6
6	(Spain) Coki / (Spain) J. Sanz	1	0
Q	(Spain) A. Martinez / (Argentina) J. De Pascual	3	6
4	(Spain) Lebrón / (Argentina) L. Augsburger	6	7
3	(Argentina) Stupaczuk / (Spain) Yanguas	2	6	3
13	(Spain) A. Goñi / (Spain) E. Alonso	6	4	6
15	(Argentina) J. Tello / (Argentina) M. Arce	6	6	6
2	(Argentina) Chingotto / (Spain) Galán	4	7	7

Semi-Finals
1	(Spain) Coello / (Argentina) Tapia	6	6
4	(Spain) Lebrón / (Argentina) L. Augsburger	2	1
13	(Spain) A. Goñi / (Spain) E. Alonso	1	5
2	(Argentina) Chingotto / (Spain) Galán	6	7

Finals
1	(Spain) Coello / (Argentina) Tapia	3	5
2	(Argentina) Chingotto / (Spain) Galán	6	7

=== Women's Bracket ===
Round of 32
1	(Argentina) D. Brea / (Spain) G. Triay
Bye
Q	(Spain) M. Talavan / (Spain) S. Saiz	6	6
17	(France) A. Collombon / (Spain) J. Montes	4	1
Q	(Argentina) D. Valenzuela / (Brazil) R. Piltcher	1	3
14	(Spain) A. Perez / (Spain) L. Martinez	6	6
Bye
7	(Spain) A. Salazar / (Spain) A. Alonso
5	(Argentina) C. Jensen / (Spain) T. Icardo
Bye
10	(Argentina) A. Osoro / (Spain) V. Iglesias	1	7	4
18	(Italy) G. Dal Pozzo / (Spain) N. Rodriguez	6	6	6
Q	(Spain) A. Cañellas / (Spain) L. Exposito	3	6
19	(Spain) L. Manquillo / (Spain) N. Aguilar	6	7
Bye
3	(Spain) A. Ustero / (Spain) A. Sánchez
4	(Spain) C. Fernández / (Portugal) S. Araújo
Bye
11	(Spain) A. Martinez / (Spain) L. Sainz	6	3
13	(Argentina) J. Bidahorria / (Spain) M. Caparros	7	6
Q	(Spain) L. Arruabarrena / (Spain) M. Lobo	6	6
WC	(Argentina) F. San Martin / (Chile) G. Minieri	3	1
Bye
8	(Spain) M. Guinart / (Spain) V. Virseda
6	(Spain) M. Ortega / (Spain) M. Calvo
Bye
15	(Spain) M.R. Abajo / (Spain) M. Borrero	4	4
16	(Spain) T. Navarro / (Argentina) V. Riera	6	6
9	(Spain) B. Caldera / (Spain) C. Goenaga	7	7
12	(Spain) J. Castelló / (Spain) L. Rufo	5	5
Bye
2	(Spain) B. González / (Spain) P. Josemaria

Round of 16
1	(Argentina) D. Brea / (Spain) G. Triay	6	6
Q	(Spain) M. Talavan / (Spain) S. Saiz	2	4
14	(Spain) A. Perez / (Spain) L. Martinez	3	4
7	(Spain) A. Salazar / (Spain) A. Alonso	6	6
5	(Argentina) C. Jensen / (Spain) T. Icardo	6	5	6
18	(Italy) G. Dal Pozzo / (Spain) N. Rodriguez	1	7	3
19	(Spain) L. Manquillo / (Spain) N. Aguilar	2	6
3	(Spain) A. Ustero / (Spain) A. Sánchez	6	7
4	(Spain) C. Fernández / (Portugal) S. Araújo	7	6
13	(Argentina) J. Bidahorria / (Spain) M. Caparros	6	0
Q	(Spain) L. Arruabarrena / (Spain) M. Lobo	3	2
8	(Spain) M. Guinart / (Spain) V. Virseda	6	6
6	(Spain) M. Ortega / (Spain) M. Calvo	6	6
16	(Spain) T. Navarro / (Argentina) V. Riera	4	2
9	(Spain) B. Caldera / (Spain) C. Goenaga	1	1
2	(Spain) B. González / (Spain) P. Josemaria	6	6

Quarter-Final
1	(Argentina) D. Brea / (Spain) G. Triay	6	6
7	(Spain) A. Salazar / (Spain) A. Alonso	2	4
5	(Argentina) C. Jensen / (Spain) T. Icardo	6	4
3	(Spain) A. Ustero / (Spain) A. Sánchez	7	6
4	(Spain) C. Fernández / (Portugal) S. Araújo	3	7	6
8	(Spain) M. Guinart / (Spain) V. Virseda	6	5	3
6	(Spain) M. Ortega / (Spain) M. Calvo	1	2
2	(Spain) B. González / (Spain) P. Josemaria	6	6

Semi-Finals
1	(Argentina) D. Brea / (Spain) G. Triay	7	6
3	(Spain) A. Ustero / (Spain) A. Sánchez	6	2
4	(Spain) C. Fernández / (Portugal) S. Araújo	6	5	2
2	(Spain) B. González / (Spain) P. Josemaria	3	7	6

Finals
1	(Argentina) D. Brea / (Spain) G. Triay	6	3	3
2	(Spain) B. González / (Spain) P. Josemaria	4	6	6

== Results ==
=== Round of 32 ===
Men's

Date	Winners	Score	Opponent	Refs.
6/5/2026	(Spain) Jairo Bautista (Brazil) Lucas Campagnolo	6–2 / 6–1	(Chile) Javier Valdes (Argentina) Renzo Gabriel Nuñez	
6/5/2026	(Argentina) Alex Chozas (Argentina) Valentino Libaak	5–7 / 6–4 / 7–6	(Argentina) Eduardo Agustín Torre (Spain) Javi Leal	
5/5/2026	(Spain) Coki Nieto (Spain) Jon Sanz	6–3 / 6–3	(Italy) Denis Perino (Spain) Pincho Fernandez	
6/5/2026	(Spain) Javier Garrido (Brazil) Lucas Bergamini	5–7 / 6–4 / 6–2	(Argentina) Gonzalo Alfonso (Spain) Javier Barahona	
6/5/2026	(Spain) Alonso Rodriguez Martinez (Argentina) Juan Ignacio De Pascual	6–7 / 6–4 / 7–6	(Spain) Guillermo Collado (Spain) Pol Hernandez	
6/5/2026	(Argentina) Federico Mouriño (Spain) Marc Quilez	6–2 / 5–7 / 6–2	(Argentina) Sanyo Gutiérrez (Spain) Victor Ruiz	
6/5/2026	(Spain) Jose Garcia Diestro (Argentina) Maximiliano Sánchez Blasco	6–4 / 6–4	(Paraguay) Facundo Dehnike (Spain) Marcel Font	
5/5/2026	(Spain) Aimar Goñi (Spain) Eduardo Alonso	6–3 / 6–4	(Spain) Aléx Ruiz (Spain) Juanlu Esbri	
5/5/2026	(Argentina) Martin Di Nenno (Spain) Momo González	6–3 / 6–4	(Spain) Alex Arroyo (Argentina) Leonel Aguirre	
5/5/2026	(Argentina) Juan Tello (Argentina) Maximiliano Arce	6–4 / 7–6	(Spain) Francisco Guerrero (Spain) Paquito Navarro	
6/5/2026	(Spain) Pablo Garcia Rodrigo (Spain) Pablo Lijó	6–3 / 6–2	(Paraguay) Martin Abud (Argentina) Miguel Lamperti	
6/5/2026	(Spain) David Gala Sánchez (United Arab Emirates) Iñigo Jofre	6–2 / 7–6	(Argentina) Antonio Graupera (Argentina) Mirko Kloster	

Women's

Date	Winners	Score	Opponent	Refs.
6/5/2026	(Spain) Marta Talavan (Spain) Sofía Saiz Vallejo	6–4 / 6–1	(France) Alix Collombon (Spain) Jana Montes Cabruja	
6/5/2026	(Spain) Agueda Perez (Spain) Lucia Martinez	6–1 / 6–3	(Argentina) Daiara Valenzuela (Brazil) Raquel Piltcher	
6/5/2026	(Italy) Giulia Dal Pozzo (Spain) Nuria Rodriguez	6–1 / 6–7 / 6–4	(Argentina) Aranzazu Osoro (Spain) Victoria Iglesias	
6/5/2026	(Spain) Letizia Manquillo (Spain) Noemi Aguilar	6–3 / 7–6	(Spain) Ariadna Cañellas (Spain) Lucia Exposito	
6/5/2026	(Argentina) Julieta Bidahorria (Spain) Marta Caparros	7–6 / 6–3	(Spain) Araceli Martinez (Spain) Lucía Sainz	
6/5/2026	(Spain) Lara Arruabarrena (Spain) Marina Lobo	6–3 / 6–1	(Argentina) Fiorella San Martin (Chile) Gianina Minieri	
6/5/2026	(Spain) Teresa Navarro (Argentina) Virginia Riera	6–4 / 6–4	(Spain) Maria Rodriguez Abajo (Spain) Marta Borrero	
6/5/2026	(Spain) Beatriz Caldera (Spain) Carmen Goenaga	7–5 / 7–5	(Spain) Jessica Castelló (Spain) Lorena Rufo	

=== Round of 16 ===
Men's

Date	Winners	Score	Opponent	Refs.
7/5/2026	(Argentina) Agustín Tapia (Spain) Arturo Coello	6–4 / 6–4	(Spain) Jairo Bautista (Brazil) Lucas Campagnolo	
7/5/2026	(Spain) Coki Nieto (Spain) Jon Sanz	3–6 / 7–6 / 7–6	(Argentina) Alex Chozas (Argentina) Valentino Libaak	
7/5/2026	(Spain) Alonso Rodriguez Martinez (Argentina) Juan Ignacio De Pascual	7–5 / 6–3	(Spain) Javier Garrido (Brazil) Lucas Bergamini	
7/5/2026	(Spain) Juan Lebrón (Argentina) Leandro Augsburger	6–2 / 6–2	(Argentina) Federico Mouriño (Spain) Marc Quilez	
7/5/2026	(Argentina) Franco Stupaczuk (Spain) Mike Yanguas	6–2 / 7–6	(Spain) Jose Garcia Diestro (Argentina) Maximiliano Sánchez Blasco	
7/5/2026	(Spain) Aimar Goñi (Spain) Eduardo Alonso	6–3 / 6–4	(Argentina) Martin Di Nenno (Spain) Momo González	
7/5/2026	(Argentina) Juan Tello (Argentina) Maximiliano Arce	4–6 / 6–3 / 6–3	(Spain) Pablo Garcia Rodrigo (Spain) Pablo Lijó	
7/5/2026	(Spain) Alejandro Galán (Argentina) Federico Chingotto	7–6 / 6–4	(Spain) David Gala Sánchez (United Arab Emirates) Iñigo Jofre	

Women's

Date	Winners	Score	Opponent	Refs.
7/5/2026	(Argentina) Delfina Brea (Spain) Gemma Triay	6–2 / 6–4	(Spain) Marta Talavan (Spain) Sofía Saiz Vallejo	
7/5/2026	(Spain) Alejandra Alonso (Spain) Alejandra Salazar	6–3 / 6–4	(Spain) Agueda Perez (Spain) Lucia Martinez	
7/5/2026	(Argentina) Claudia Jensen (Spain) Tamara Icardo	6–1 / 5–7 / 6–3	(Italy) Giulia Dal Pozzo (Spain) Nuria Rodriguez	
7/5/2026	(Spain) Andrea Ustero (Spain) Ariana Sánchez	6–2 / 7–6	(Spain) Letizia Manquillo (Spain) Noemi Aguilar	
7/5/2026	(Spain) Claudia Fernández (Portugal) Sofia Araújo	7–6 / 6–0	(Argentina) Julieta Bidahorria (Spain) Marta Caparros	
7/5/2026	(Spain) Marina Guinart (Spain) Verónica Virseda	6–3 / 6–2	(Spain) Lara Arruabarrena (Spain) Marina Lobo	
7/5/2026	(Spain) Marta Ortega (Spain) Martina Calvo	6–4 / 6–2	(Spain) Teresa Navarro (Argentina) Virginia Riera	
7/5/2026	(Spain) Bea González (Spain) Paula Josemaría	6–1 / 6–1	(Spain) Beatriz Caldera (Spain) Carmen Goenaga	

=== Quarter-Finals ===
Men's

Date	Winners	Score	Opponent	Refs.
8/5/2026	(Argentina) Agustín Tapia (Spain) Arturo Coello	6–1 / 6–0	(Spain) Coki Nieto (Spain) Jon Sanz	
8/5/2026	(Spain) Juan Lebrón (Argentina) Leandro Augsburger	6–3 / 7–6	(Spain) Alonso Rodriguez Martinez (Argentina) Juan Ignacio De Pascual	
8/5/2026	(Spain) Aimar Goñi (Spain) Eduardo Alonso	6–2 / 4–6 / 6–3	(Argentina) Franco Stupaczuk (Spain) Mike Yanguas	
8/5/2026	(Spain) Alejandro Galán (Argentina) Federico Chingotto	4–6 / 7–6 / 7–6	(Argentina) Juan Tello (Argentina) Maximiliano Arce	

Women's

Date	Winners	Score	Opponent	Refs.
8/5/2026	(Argentina) Delfina Brea (Spain) Gemma Triay	6–2 / 6–4	(Spain) Alejandra Alonso (Spain) Alejandra Salazar	
8/5/2026	(Spain) Andrea Ustero (Spain) Ariana Sánchez	7–6 / 6–4	(Argentina) Claudia Jensen (Spain) Tamara Icardo	
8/5/2026	(Spain) Claudia Fernández (Portugal) Sofia Araújo	3–6 / 7–5 / 6–3	(Spain) Marina Guinart (Spain) Verónica Virseda	
8/5/2026	(Spain) Bea González (Spain) Paula Josemaría	6–1 / 6–2	(Spain) Marta Ortega (Spain) Martina Calvo	

=== Semi-Finals ===
Men's

Date	Winners	Score	Opponent	Refs.
9/5/2026	(Argentina) Agustín Tapia (Spain) Arturo Coello	6–2 / 6–1	(Spain) Juan Lebrón (Argentina) Leandro Augsburger	
9/5/2026	(Spain) Alejandro Galán (Argentina) Federico Chingotto	6–1 / 7–5	(Spain) Aimar Goñi (Spain) Eduardo Alonso	

Women's

Date	Winners	Score	Opponent	Refs.
9/5/2026	(Argentina) Delfina Brea (Spain) Gemma Triay	7–6 / 6–2	(Spain) Andrea Ustero (Spain) Ariana Sánchez	
9/5/2026	(Spain) Bea González (Spain) Paula Josemaría	3–6 / 7–5 / 6–2	(Spain) Claudia Fernández (Portugal) Sofia Araújo	

=== Finals ===
Men's

Date	Winners	Score	Opponent	Refs.
10/5/2026	(Spain) Alejandro Galán (Argentina) Federico Chingotto	6–3 / 7–5	(Argentina) Agustín Tapia (Spain) Arturo Coello	

Women's

Date	Winners	Score	Opponent	Refs.
10/5/2026	(Spain) Bea González (Spain) Paula Josemaría	4–6 / 6–3 / 6–3	(Argentina) Delfina Brea (Spain) Gemma Triay	
