= 2025 Premier Padel Finals =

Padel championships

- Date: 11 – 14 December
- Edition: 2nd
- Category: Finals
- Prize money: €600.000
- Location: Barcelona, Spain
- Venue: Palau Sant Jordi

Champions
- Men's doubles: (Argentina) Agustín Tapia (Spain) Arturo Coello
- Women's doubles: (Spain) Bea González (Spain) Claudia Fernández

Chronology

The 2025 Premier Padel Finals (officially 2025 Qatar Airways Barcelona Premier Padel Finals) was the twenty-third tournament of the fourth season organized by Premier Padel, the premier padel circuit, promoted by the International Padel Federation, and with the financial backing of Nasser Al-Khelaïfi's Qatar Sports Investments.

In the women's category, the No. 1 and No. 3 pairs ranked by the FIP repeated the two preivous tournaments finals, facing each other in a final for the fifth time in 2025. In the title match, Bea González and Claudia Fernández defeated the world number ones, Delfina Brea and Gemma Triay, claiming their third consecutive title and their sixth of the season.

In the men's category, the two top-ranked pairs faced each other in a final for the eight consecutive time (including the Pairs World Cup) and for the fourteenth time this season. In the decisive match, Agustín Tapia and Arturo Coello defeated to Alejandro Galán and Federico Chingotto, securing their thirteenth title of the season.

== Relevant Data ==
=== End of partnerships and new pairings ===
As in previous years, the season-ending tournament (the Masters Finals in WPT and the Premier Padel Finals in PP) marked the final event for several pairings.

The first and most significant split involved one of the greatest women's padel duos: Ariana Sánchez and Paula Josemaría. Similarly, the world number 3 pair, Bea González and Claudia Fernandéz, also decided to part ways. Bea would team up with Paula, while Ariana Sánchez would partner with Andrea Ustero (thereby breaking up the number 4 pair), while Claudia would join forces with Sofia Araújo.

Similarly, there were several changes in the men's division as well. Beyond Juan Lebrón and Leandro Augsburger launching a new project, Franco Stupczuk announced that he and Mike Yanguas would join forces once again, forming the "2.0" version of their partnership. Meanwhile, Coki Nieto, Yanguas's former partner, would team up with Jon Sanz.

== Seeds ==
Male

Rnk.	Team	FIP Ranking Points
1	(Argentina) Agustín Tapia (Spain) Arturo Coello	36600
2	(Spain) Alejandro Galán (Argentina) Federico Chingotto	32480
3	(Spain) Juan Lebrón (Argentina) Leandro Augsburguer	12460
4	(Spain) Coki Nieto (Spain) Mike Yanguas	12104
5	(Argentina) Franco Stupaczuk (Argentina) Martin Di Nenno	11865
6	(Spain) Jon Sanz (Spain) Paquito Navarro	10530
7	(Spain) Francisco Guerrero (Spain) Momo Gonzalez	8310
8	(Spain) Javi Leal (Brazil) Lucas Bergamini	7765

Female

Rnk.	Team	FIP Ranking Points
1	(Argentina) Delfina Brea (Spain) Gemma Triay	34320
2	(Spain) Ariana Sánchez (Spain) Paula Josemaria	28600
3	(Spain) Bea González (Spain) Claudia Fernandéz	23080
4	(Spain) Andrea Ustero (Portugal) Sofia Araújo	12990
5	(Spain) Marta Ortega (Spain) Tamara Icardo	12080
6	(Spain) Alejandra Alonso (Argentina) Claudia Jensen	10295
7	(Spain) Alejandra Salazar (Spain) Martina Calvo	9415
8	(Spain) Marina Guinart (Spain) Veronica Virseda	7775

== Head-to-head record between teams ranked in the top 4 during the season ==
=== Man's ===
Record	Coello–Tapia	Galán–Chingotto	Coki–Yanguas	Di Nenno–Stupaczuk	Former Pairs	Lebrón–Stupaczuk
Coello–Tapia	—	10–4	6–0	—		4–1
Galán–Chingotto	4–10	—	6–0	—		6–1
Coki–Yanguas	0–6	0–6	—	—		—
Di Nenno–Stupaczuk	—	—	—	—		—
Former Pairs						
Lebrón–Stupaczuk	1–4	1–6	—	—		—

=== Women's ===
Record	D. Brea–Triay	Ariana–Paula	Gonzalez–Fernandez	Araújo–Ustero	Former Pairs	Araújo–Ortega
D. Brea–Triay	—	7–2	2–9	6–0		3–0
Ariana–Paula	2–7	—	8–3	6–0		1–1
Gonzalez–Fernandez	9–2	3–8	—	—		—
Araújo–Ustero	0–6	0–6	—	—		—
Former Pairs						
Araújo–Ortega	0–3	1–1	—	—		—

Because the Santiago final ended in a draw, it is not counted.

== Draws ==
=== Men's Bracket ===
Quarter-Final
1	(Spain) Coello / (Argentina) Tapia	6	6
8	(Spain) J. Leal / (Brazil) L. Bergamini	2	2
5	(Argentina) Di Nenno / (Argentina) Stupaczuk	6	6
3	(Spain) Lebrón / (Argentina) L. Augsburger	2	4
4	(Spain) Coki / (Spain) Yanguas	2	6
6	(Spain) J. Sanz / (Spain) Paquito	6	7
7	(Spain) F. Guerrero / (Spain) Momo	0	4
2	(Argentina) Chingotto / (Spain) Galán	6	6

Semi-Finals
1	(Spain) Coello / (Argentina) Tapia	7	6
5	(Argentina) Di Nenno / (Argentina) Stupaczuk	5	2
4	(Spain) J. Sanz / (Spain) Paquito	2	4
2	(Argentina) Chingotto / (Spain) Galán	6	6

Finals
1	(Spain) Coello / (Argentina) Tapia	6	6	7
2	(Argentina) Chingotto / (Spain) Galán	7	3	6
Third place
5	(Argentina) Di Nenno / (Argentina) Stupaczuk	7	6
4	(Spain) J. Sanz / (Spain) Paquito	6	3

=== Women's Bracket ===
Quarter-Final
1	(Argentina) D. Brea / (Spain) G. Triay	6	6
8	(Spain) M. Guinart / (Spain) V. Virseda	2	3
5	(Spain) M. Ortega / (Spain) T. Icardo	1	1
4	(Spain) A. Ustero / (Portugal) S. Araújo	6	6
3	(Spain) B. González / (Spain) C. Fernández	6	4	6
6	(Spain) A. Alonso / (Argentina) C. Jensen	4	6	4
7	(Spain) A. Salazar / (Spain) M. Calvo	2	6	1
2	(Spain) A. Sánchez / (Spain) P. Josemaria	6	1	6

Semi-Finals
1	(Argentina) D. Brea / (Spain) G. Triay	6	6
4	(Spain) A. Ustero / (Portugal) S. Araújo	1	4
3	(Spain) B. González / (Spain) C. Fernández	6	6
2	(Spain) A. Sánchez / (Spain) P. Josemaria	4	2

Finals
1	(Argentina) D. Brea / (Spain) G. Triay	4	6	3
3	(Spain) B. González / (Spain) C. Fernández	6	0	6
Third place
4	(Spain) A. Ustero / (Portugal) S. Araújo	5	6
2	(Spain) A. Sánchez / (Spain) P. Josemaria	6	7

== Results ==
=== Quarter-Finals ===
Men's

Date	Winners	Score	Opponent	Refs.
11/12/2025	(Argentina) Agustín Tapia (Spain) Arturo Coello	6–2 / 6–2	(Spain) Javi Leal (Brazil) Lucas Bergamini	
11/12/2025	(Argentina) Franco Stupaczuk (Argentina) Martin Di Nenno	6–2 / 6–4	(Spain) Juan Lebrón (Argentina) Leandro Augsburger	
12/12/2025	(Spain) Jon Sanz (Spain) Paquito Navarro	6–2 / 7–6	(Spain) Coki Nieto (Spain) Mike Yanguas	
12/12/2025	(Spain) Alejandro Galán (Argentina) Federico Chingotto	6–0 / 6–4	(Spain) Francisco Guerrero (Spain) Momo Gonzalez	

Women's

Date	Winners	Score	Opponent	Refs.
11/12/2025	(Argentina) Delfina Brea (Spain) Gemma Triay	6–2 / 6–3	(Spain) Marina Guinart (Spain) Verónica Virseda	
11/12/2025	(Spain) Andrea Ustero (Portugal) Sofia Araújo	6–1 / 6–1	(Spain) Marta Ortega (Spain) Tamara Icardo	
12/12/2025	(Spain) Bea González (Spain) Claudia Fernandéz	6–4 / 4–6 / 6–4	(Spain) Alejandra Alonso (Argentina) Claudia Jensen	
12/12/2025	(Spain) Ariana Sánchez (Spain) Paula Josemaría	6–2 / 1–6 / 6–1	(Spain) Alejandra Salazar (Spain) Martina Calvo	

=== Semi-Finals ===
Men's

Date	Winners	Score	Opponent	Refs.
13/12/2025	(Argentina) Agustín Tapia (Spain) Arturo Coello	7–5 / 6–2	(Argentina) Franco Stupaczuk (Argentina) Martin Di Nenno	
13/12/2025	(Spain) Alejandro Galán (Argentina) Federico Chingotto	6–2 / 6–4	(Spain) Jon Sanz (Spain) Paquito Navarro	

Women's

Date	Winners	Score	Opponent	Refs.
13/12/2025	(Argentina) Delfina Brea (Spain) Gemma Triay	6–1 / 6–4	(Spain) Andrea Ustero (Portugal) Sofia Araújo	
13/12/2025	(Spain) Bea González (Spain) Claudia Fernandéz	6–4 / 6–2	(Spain) Ariana Sánchez (Spain) Paula Josemaría	

=== 3rd Place Match ===
Men's

Date	Winners	Score	Opponent	Refs.
14/12/2025	(Argentina) Franco Stupaczuk (Argentina) Martin Di Nenno	7–6 / 6–3	(Spain) Jon Sanz (Spain) Paquito Navarro	

Women's

Date	Winners	Score	Opponent	Refs.
14/12/2025	(Spain) Ariana Sánchez (Spain) Paula Josemaría	7–5 / 7–6	(Spain) Andrea Ustero (Portugal) Sofia Araújo	

=== Finals ===
Men's

Date	Winners	Score	Opponent	Refs.
14/12/2025	(Argentina) Agustín Tapia (Spain) Arturo Coello	6–7 / 6–3 / 7–6	(Spain) Alejandro Galán (Argentina) Federico Chingotto	

Women's

Date	Winners	Score	Opponent	Refs.
14/12/2025	(Spain) Bea González (Spain) Claudia Fernandéz	6–4 / 0–6 / 6–3	(Argentina) Delfina Brea (Spain) Gemma Triay	
