= Beatriz González Fernández =

Spanish padel player (born 2001)

Bea González
Personal information
- Full name: Beatriz González Fernández
- Nickname: 'La Perla'
- Citizenship: Spanish
- Born: 23 November 2001 (age 24) Málaga, Spain
- Height: 1.74 m (5 ft 8 1/2 in)

Sport
- Country: Spain
- Sport: Padel
- Position: 'Revés' (Left side)
- Partner: Paula Josemaría
- Coached by: Juan Gutiérrez, Claudio Gilardoni

Achievements and titles
- World finals: 2022, 2024
- Updated on 4 October 2026

Beatriz González Fernández (born 23 November 2001), known as Bea González, is a Spanish professional padel player who plays on the left side (revés).

González entered the professional circuit in 2016 at the age of 14, its youngest player, and in 2020 became the youngest winner of a World Padel Tour (WPT) title, aged 18. In 2023, playing with the Argentine Delfina Brea, she won eight titles in one season and ended the year as the world No. 2 pair. In 2025, with Claudia Fernández, she won six titles, and in 2026 she began a partnership with Paula Josemaría.

== Early life ==
González was born in Málaga on 23 November 2001 and comes from El Palo, a coastal district of the city from which her nickname "La Perla de El Palo" (The Pearl of El Palo) is taken. She first picked up a racket at the age of four, hitting a ball against a wall while her father played with friends, and began lessons at eight. In 2016, González debut in the main professional circuit, World Padel Tour, at the age of 14, becoming the youngest player ever to play in the circuit, the following year she won the Spanish under-18 championship and a junior world team title in her category, and in 2018 she began partnering the experienced Argentine Catalina Tenorio, then No. 6 in the WPT ranking. She is the granddaughter of Antonio González Álvarez, "Chuzo", a footballer who played for Málaga and Atlético Madrid.

== Padel Career ==
=== First years ===
In her debut year, at just 14 years old, Bea played alongside veteran and two-time world number one Paula Eyheraguibel. Their best result came at the Barcelona Challenger, where they reached the quarterfinals.

The following year, she would play part of the season with Elena Ramirez and the rest with Nelia Brito, but would fail to advance beyond the early rounds in any tournament.

=== Partnership with Catalina Tenorio ===
==== 2018 ====
2018 would be Bea's breakthrough year, at just 16 years old, alongside former world number one Catalina Tenorio. They began the season with quarterfinal appearances in their first two tournaments, and at the Jaén Open, the season's fourth event, they reached their first semifinal, where they were eliminated by Gemma Triay & Lucía Sainz. The pair went on to reach their second semifinal at the Mijas Open, where they faced the former world number one duo of Elisabeth Amatriain & Patricia Llaguno but were unable to secure a win.

Two tournaments later, they reached another semifinal in Lugo, falling to the circuit's second-ranked pair, Alejandra Salazar & Marta Marrero. After two more quarterfinal appearances, Bea and Catalina reached their first final at the Villa de San Javier Challenger, though they once again failed to overcome Amatriain & Llaguno. They closed out the season with two additional quarterfinal finishes in the final three tournaments, allowing Bea to qualify for the Master Final for the first time in her career.

=== First stint with Delfina Brea ===
==== 2019 ====
Bea and Catalina continued together in 2019, starting the season with five consecutive quarterfinal appearances. However, after reaching the quarterfinals only once in the following four tournaments, they decided to part ways.

For the remainder of the season, Bea teamed up with Delfina Brea. The young duo began with two quarterfinal appearances before reaching their first final at the Paris Challenger, where they defeated veterans Carolina Navarro & Cecilia Reiter in three sets to claim their first title of the season, a feat they repeated against the same opponents at the San Javier Challenger. They concluded the regular season with two more quarterfinal finishes and a victory at the Spanish Under-23 Championship, ultimately ending the season with a semifinal exit at the Master Final.

=== Partnership with Marta Ortega ===
For the 2020 season, Bea teamed up with the then-world number one, Marta Ortega, who was parting ways with her partner Marta Marrero. In the only tournament they played before the COVID-19 hiatus, they reached the semifinals, followed by a quarterfinal appearance in the first tournament back after the break. At the third tournament of the year, the Vuelve a Madrid Open, Bea reached her first major tournament final in WPT, defeating Elisabeth Amatriaín & Patricia Llaguno and becoming the youngest player to win a trophy at just 18 years old.

At the following tournament, the Adeslas Open, they once again reached the finals, where they were defeated by the twins Mapi & Majo, the most successful female pair in the history of padel up to that point. They played four more tournaments together, reaching three semifinals and one quarterfinal, but decided to part ways after the Barcelona Master. After parting ways with Marta, Bea would play the season's remaining three tournaments alongside Paula Josemaria, reaching the finals of the Las Rozas Open, where they fell to the world number ones, Gemma Triay & Lucia Sainz.

=== Partnership with Lucía Sainz ===
==== 2021 ====
In 2021, after Paula Josemaría accepted an invitation from Ariana Sánchez, for the second consecutive year Bea would begin the year alongside a then-world number one, Lucía Sainz. At the first tournament of the year, the Madrid Open, they reached the final but failed to defeat Ariana & Paula. However, in the following ten tournaments, despite reaching the semifinals five times, they were unable to make another final, losing four of those matches to the circuit's two top-ranked pairs (once against Gemma & Salazar, and three times against Ariana & Paula).

The pair's second final came at the Barcelona Master, where in the semifinals they eliminated the twins Mapi & Majo to reach the final but lost the title match to the world number ones, Gemma & Salazar. They played just one more tournament, in Lugo, before parting ways.

=== Second stint with Marta Ortega ===
After parting ways with Lucia, Bea would team up with Marta Ortega for the second time for the remainder of 2021. In their first tournament together, in Menorca, they reached the semifinals, where they were eliminated by their former partners, Lucia Sainz & Marta Marrero. Following two modest performances in the final two tournaments of the regular season, Bea and Marta played in the Master Final, where they were defeated in the quarterfinals by Ariana Sánchez & Paula Josemaria.

==== 2022 ====
In 2022, Bea and Marta began the season together but were eliminated in their first five tournaments by the top two pairs, twice in the semifinals and twice in the quarterfinals against Ariana & Paula, followed by a loss to the world number ones, Gemma & Salazar, in Brussels. However, in between the main tournaments, they competed in the Getafe and Albacete Challengers, winning both events and defeating the twins Mapi & Majo in the final of the second one. At the Danish Open, the sixth tournament of the season, Bea and Marta reached their first main tournament final of the season and defeated Mapi & Sofia Araujo to claim their third title of the year. After three inconsistent tournaments, they reached another three semifinals before the summer break, losing all of them to Gemma & Salazar.

Upon returning from the summer break, they reached the finals of the Portugal Open, where they faced the world number ones at the time, Ariana & Paula, but were forced to retire during the match due to an injury sustained by Bea. However, two tournaments later, they reached their fifth final of the year at the Amsterdam Open, where they avenged their loss in Portugal by defeating Ariana & Paula to claim their fourth title of the season. In the four remaining tournaments, they reached the semifinals in every one, wrapping up the season with an appearance at the Master Final, where they were eliminated by Gemma & Salazar in the semifinals.

==== 2023 ====
In 2023, Bea and Marta began the year with a surprise elimination in the Round of 16 at the season's first tournament, but they bounced back by reaching the final of the La Rioja Open, where they were defeated in three sets by the world number ones, Alejandra Salazar & Gemma Triay. However, they would play only two more tournaments together before parting ways.

=== Partnership with Delfina Brea ===
After parting ways with Marta, Bea teamed up with Delfina Brea debuting at the Granada Open, where they were eliminated in the semifinals in three sets by Gemma & Salazar. Following two more semifinal exits, Bea and Delfina reached the final of the season's eighth tournament, the Danish Open, where they faced and defeated Gemma & Salazar. At the subsequent tournament in Vienna, they once again reached the final but were defeated by the new world number ones, Ariana Sánchez & Paula Josemaria. After an early exit in Marbella, they reached two more finals, losing to Ariana & Paula in France and defeating Gemma & Marta Ortega at the Valladolid Master. In the four remaining tournaments before the summer break (two Premier Padel and two World Padel Tour events), they would reach just one final, the Madrid P1, where they defeated Ariana & Paula to claim their first title on the new circuit.

Upon returning from the summer break, Bea and Delfina began by winning the Finland Open, followed by a run of five finals in six tournaments, where they lost to Ariana & Paula in Amsterdam, but won the Malmö and Mexico Open's, the Milan P1 in Premier, and closed the season with a fourth consecutive title by winning the Master Final, becoming the youngest Master Final winner at 22 years and 23 days and finishing the year as the world No. 2 pair.

==== 2024 ====
Bea and Delfina started 2024 by reaching the final of the Riyadh P1 but fell short of the title, losing the deciding match to Ariana & Paula. After two tournaments without reaching a final, they won four consecutive events, the Puerto Cabello, Brussels, Seville, and Asunción P2's, defeating Claudia Fernández & Gemma Triay in the finals of the second and fourth tournaments and Ariana & Paula in the third; however, the world number ones avenged that loss by beating them in the final of the Mar del Plata P1. This results allowed González to overthrow Gemma Triay as the new No. 3 in the FIP rankings. However, the good run came to an end in the tournaments leading up to the summer break, being eliminated on the first round in Santiago, missing the Bordeaux P2 and the Italy Major due to a superficial thrombus in her left foot, and finally being forced to withdraw before the semifinals of the Málaga P1 (her home tournament) which also caused them to miss the Finland P2.

The problems persisted after the return from the summer break, forcing her to withdraw from the Madrid P1 final against Claudia & Gemma early in the second set. It was her third injury in six months, sidelining her until November and causing her to miss the Rotterdam P1, the Paris Major, and the Valladolid and Giza P2 events, thereby forfeiting a total of 4,000 points; during these periods of inactivity, she began a master's degree program in physical rehabilitation and injury prevention. In their first tournament back after injury, Bea and Delfina defeated Alejandra Alonso & Andrea Ustero to win the Dubai P1. In the following three tournaments, they would face Claudia & Gemma in each one, being eliminated in the semifinals in Kuwait and Mexico and losing the Milan P1 final after being forced to retire due to another pectoral injury suffered by Bea. The injury would cause her to miss the season's final tournament, the Premier Padel Finals.

=== Partnership with Claudia Fernández ===
==== 2025 ====
After Delfina chose to end their partnership to team up with Gemma Triay, aiming to become world number one, Bea selected 19-year-old prodigy Claudia Fernández (whom Gemma had parted ways with) as her new partner in 2025. They began the season like the previous one, reaching the final of the Riyadh P1 after defeating their former partners Delfina & Gemma in the semifinals, but being unable to play the decisive match due to physical issues affecting Bea. In the next six tournaments, they managed to reach four semifinals but were eliminated three times in a row by Ariana & Paula, and once by Delfina & Gemma in Brussels.

Their second final appearance came at the season's eighth tournament, the Asunción P2, where they defeated Delfina & Gemma in three sets to claim their first title of the year. Next, they reached the final of the Buenos Aires P1 but were unable to overcome Ariana & Paula to take the title. After a semifinal exit at the Italy Major, they managed to reach two finals in three tournaments, losing once again to Ariana & Paula at the Valladolid P2, but defeating Marta Ortega & Tamara Icardo in the Málaga P1, with Bea crowned champion on home soil. They wrapped up the first part of the season with a loss to Delfina & Gemma in the semifinals of the Tarragona P1.

They returned from the summer break in top form, defeating the new world number ones, Delfina & Gemma, in the Madrid P1 final to claim their third title of the season. After two consecutive quarter-final exits and missing the Rotterdam P1 due to medical precautions regarding Bea, they returned to reach the final at the Milan P1, where they were once again defeated by Ariana & Paula. After not competing in the Giza P2, they participated in the FIP Pairs World Cup, reaching the quarter-finals; however, they finished the season on a high note by winning the Dubai P1, the Mexico Major, and the Premier Padel Finals, defeating Delfina & Gemma in every one of those finals. The victory in the Finals came days after the death of her grandfather Chuzo, with Bea dedicating the title to him. With the results they closed 2025 with six titles from ten finals, ranked No. 3 in the pairs and No. 5 individually.

=== Partnership with Paula Josemaría ===
==== 2026 ====
González would leave Claudia to partner with Paula Josemaría in 2026, starting as the world's number two pair with the goal of reaching the number one spot. In the first two tournaments of the season, in Riyadh and Gijón, they reached the semifinals but were defeated by Paula's former partner, Ariana Sánchez, and Andrea Ustero. However, at the following tournament, they began a streak of six consecutive finals, first losing to Delfina and Gemma in Cancún, they went on to defeat them in five straight finals, winning the Miami P1, the Giza, Brussels, and Asunción P2s, and the Buenos Aires P1. Their streak of finals came to an end at the Italy Major, where they were eliminated in the semifinals by Ariana & Ustero; however, three weeks later, they returned to a final at the Valladolid P2, avenging their previous loss to Ariana & Ustero to win the tournament. Yet, in the four remaining tournaments before the summer break, they managed to reach only one final, at the Málaga P1, where Bea lost on home soil to Delfina & Gemma.

== Spain national team ==
González debuted with the Spanish national team at the 2021 European Championship in Marbella, and was first called up for the World Championship in 2022. Spain won that championship in Dubai, beating Argentina 2-0 in the final; González and Ortega were lined up for the third match, which was not needed. At the 2024 championship in Doha she played the semifinal against Portugal with Alejandra Salazar, as Spain defeated Argentina in the final to take its ninth women's world title, the sixth in a row.

== Honours ==
=== World Padel Tour (2016–2023) ===
Winner Runner-up

==== Finals ====
N.º	Date	Tournament	Partner	Result	Opponents in the final	Career title No.
2018
1.	7 October 2018	(Spain) Villa de San Javier Challenger	(Argentina) Catalina Tenorio	2–6 / 6–3 / 2–6	(Spain) Elisabeth Amatriain (Spain) Patricia Llaguno	
2019
2.	6 October 2019	(France) Paris Challenger	(Argentina) Delfina Brea	0–6 / 6–3 / 6–2	(Spain) Carolina Navarro (Argentina) Cecilia Reiter	1st
3.	27 October 2019	(Spain) San Javier Challenger	(Argentina) Delfina Brea	6–2 / 6–4	(Spain) Carolina Navarro (Argentina) Cecilia Reiter	2nd
2020
4.	19 July 2020	(Spain) Vuelve a Madrid Open	(Spain) Marta Ortega	5–7 / 6–1 / 6–1	(Spain) Elisabeth Amatriaín (Spain) Patricia Llaguno	3rd
5.	9 August 2020	(Spain) Adeslas Open	(Spain) Marta Ortega	6–4 / 4–6 / 4–6	(Spain) Mapi Sánchez (Spain) Majo Sánchez	
6.	22 November 2020	(Spain) Las Rozas Open	(Spain) Paula Josemaría	0–6 / 6–7	(Spain) Gemma Triay (Spain) Lucía Sainz	
2021
7.	11 April 2021	(Spain) Madrid Open	(Spain) Lucía Sainz	3–6 / 4–6	(Spain) Ariana Sánchez (Spain) Paula Josemaría	
8.	19 September 2021	(Spain) Barcelona Master	(Spain) Lucía Sainz	1–6 / 2–6	(Spain) Alejandra Salazar (Spain) Gemma Triay	
2022
9.	3 April 2022	(Spain) Getafe Challenger	(Spain) Marta Ortega	6–4 / 6–1	(Spain) Carla Mesa (Argentina) Claudia Jensen	4th
10.	1 May 2022	(Spain) Albacete Challenger	(Spain) Marta Ortega	3–6 / 6–3 / 6–1	(Spain) Mapi Sánchez (Spain) Majo Sánchez	5th
11.	22 May 2022	(Denmark) Danish Open	(Spain) Marta Ortega	6–2 / 6–1	(Spain) Mapi Sánchez Alayeto (Portugal) Sofia Araújo	6th
12.	11 September 2022	Portugal Open	(Spain) Marta Ortega	5–7 / 0–1 / WO	(Spain) Ariana Sánchez (Spain) Paula Josemaría	
13.	2 October 2022	(Netherlands) Amsterdam Open	(Spain) Marta Ortega	6–4 / 2–6 / 6–1	(Spain) Ariana Sánchez (Spain) Paula Josemaría	7th
2023
14.	12 March 2023	(Argentina) La Rioja Open	(Spain) Marta Ortega	7–6 / 4–6 / 1–6	(Spain) Alejandra Salazar (Spain) Gemma Triay	
15.	21 May 2023	(Denmark) Danish Open	(Argentina) Delfina Brea	6–2 / 3–6 / 6–4	(Spain) Alejandra Salazar (Spain) Gemma Triay	8th
16.	28 May 2023	(Austria) Vienna Open	(Argentina) Delfina Brea	3–6 / 1–6	(Spain) Ariana Sánchez (Spain) Paula Josemaría	
17.	18 June 2023	France Open	(Argentina) Delfina Brea	1–6 / 6–4 / 6–7	(Spain) Ariana Sánchez (Spain) Paula Josemaría	
18.	25 June 2023	(Spain) Valladolid Master	(Argentina) Delfina Brea	6–2 / 5–7 / 6–2	(Spain) Gemma Triay (Spain) Marta Ortega	9th
19.	3 September 2023	Finland Open	(Argentina) Delfina Brea	6–4 / 6–1	(Spain) Alejandra Salazar (Portugal) Sofia Araújo	10th
20.	15 October 2023	(Netherlands) Amsterdam Open	(Argentina) Delfina Brea	6–7 / 0–6	(Spain) Ariana Sánchez (Spain) Paula Josemaría	
21.	12 November 2023	(Sweden) Malmö Open	(Argentina) Delfina Brea	6–4 / 6–3	(Spain) Alejandra Salazar (Portugal) Sofia Araújo	11th
22.	26 November 2023	Mexico Open	(Argentina) Delfina Brea	6–4 / 6–2	(Spain) Tamara Icardo (Argentina) Virginia Riera	12th
23.	17 December 2023	(Spain) Master Final	(Argentina) Delfina Brea	6–4 / 6–1	(Argentina) Aranza Osoro (Spain) Jessica Castelló	13th

Tournaments won	Challenger	Open	Master	Master Final	Total
Tournaments won	4	7	1	1	13

=== Premier Padel (2022–present) ===
Winner Runner-up

==== Finals ====
N.º	Date	Tournament	Partner	Result	Opponents in the final	Career title No.
2023
24.	23 July 2023	(Spain) Madrid P1	(Argentina) Delfina Brea	5–7 / 7–6 / 7–6	(Spain) Ariana Sánchez (Spain) Paula Josemaría	14th
25.	10 December 2023	(Italy) Milan P1	(Argentina) Delfina Brea	6–0 / 7–6	(Spain) Alejandra Salazar (Portugal) Sofia Araújo	15th
2024
26.	2 March 2024	(Saudi Arabia) Riyadh P1	(Argentina) Delfina Brea	3–6 / 2–6	(Spain) Ariana Sánchez (Spain) Paula Josemaría	
27.	31 March 2024	(Venezuela) Puerto Cabello P2	(Argentina) Delfina Brea	6–4 / 6–3	(Spain) Alejandra Salazar (Spain) Tamara Icardo	16th
28.	28 April 2024	(Belgium) Brussels P2	(Argentina) Delfina Brea	6–4 / 6–4	(Spain) Claudia Fernández (Spain) Gemma Triay	17th
29.	5 May 2024	(Spain) Seville P2	(Argentina) Delfina Brea	6–1 / 6–1	(Spain) Ariana Sánchez (Spain) Paula Josemaría	18th
30.	19 May 2024	(Paraguay) Asunción P2	(Argentina) Delfina Brea	6–3 / 7–5	(Spain) Claudia Fernández (Spain) Gemma Triay	19th
31.	26 May 2024	(Argentina) Mar del Plata P1	(Argentina) Delfina Brea	1–6 / 7–5 / 4–6	(Spain) Ariana Sánchez (Spain) Paula Josemaría	
32.	8 September 2024	(Spain) Madrid P1	(Argentina) Delfina Brea	2–6 / 1–2 / W.O.	(Spain) Claudia Fernández (Spain) Gemma Triay	
33.	10 November 2024	(United Arab Emirates) Dubai P1	(Argentina) Delfina Brea	6–2 / 6–3	(Spain) Alejandra Alonso (Spain) Andrea Ustero	20th
34.	8 December 2024	(Italy) Milan P1	(Argentina) Delfina Brea	7–6 / 2–5 / W.O.	(Spain) Claudia Fernández (Spain) Gemma Triay	
2025
35.	15 February 2025	(Saudi Arabia) Riyadh P1	(Spain) Claudia Fernández	W.O.	(Spain) Ariana Sánchez (Spain) Paula Josemaría	
36.	25 May 2025	(Paraguay) Asunción P2	(Spain) Claudia Fernández	7–6 / 3–6 / 6–2	(Argentina) Delfina Brea (Spain) Gemma Triay	21st
37.	1 June 2025	(Argentina) Buenos Aires P1	(Spain) Claudia Fernández	2–6 / 2–6	(Spain) Ariana Sánchez (Spain) Paula Josemaría	
38.	29 June 2025	(Spain) Valladolid P2	(Spain) Claudia Fernández	4–6 / 5–7	(Spain) Ariana Sánchez (Spain) Paula Josemaría	
39.	20 July 2025	(Spain) Málaga P1	(Spain) Claudia Fernández	6–2 / 6–1	(Spain) Marta Ortega (Spain) Tamara Icardo	22nd
40.	7 September 2025	(Spain) Madrid P1	(Spain) Claudia Fernández	3–6 / 6–1 / 6–4	(Argentina) Delfina Brea (Spain) Gemma Triay	23rd
41.	12 October 2025	(Italy) Milan P1	(Spain) Claudia Fernández	6–2 / 6–4	(Spain) Ariana Sánchez (Spain) Paula Josemaría	
42.	16 November 2025	(United Arab Emirates) Dubai P1	(Spain) Claudia Fernández	6–1 / 7–5	(Argentina) Delfina Brea (Spain) Gemma Triay	24th
43.	30 November 2025	Mexico Major	(Spain) Claudia Fernández	6–2 / 6–4	(Argentina) Delfina Brea (Spain) Gemma Triay	25th
44.	14 December 2025	(Spain) Premier Padel Finals	(Spain) Claudia Fernández	6–4 / 0–6 / 6–2	(Argentina) Delfina Brea (Spain) Gemma Triay	26th
2026
45.	22 March 2026	(Mexico) Cancún P2	(Spain) Paula Josemaría	6–7 / 1–6	(Argentina) Delfina Brea (Spain) Gemma Triay	
46.	29 March 2026	(United States) Miami P1	(Spain) Paula Josemaría	6–3 / 4–6 / 7–5	(Argentina) Delfina Brea (Spain) Gemma Triay	27th
47.	18 April 2026	(Egypt) Giza P2	(Spain) Paula Josemaría	6–4 / 5–7 / 6–4	(Argentina) Delfina Brea (Spain) Gemma Triay	28th
48.	26 April 2026	(Belgium) Brussels P2	(Spain) Paula Josemaría	7–5 / 6–2	(Argentina) Delfina Brea (Spain) Gemma Triay	29th
49.	10 May 2026	(Paraguay) Asunción P2	(Spain) Paula Josemaría	4–6 / 6–3 / 6–3	(Argentina) Delfina Brea (Spain) Gemma Triay	30th
50.	17 May 2026	(Argentina) Buenos Aires P1	(Spain) Paula Josemaría	6–3 / 7–5	(Argentina) Delfina Brea (Spain) Gemma Triay	31st
51.	28 June 2026	(Spain) Valladolid P2	(Spain) Paula Josemaría	4–6 / 2–6	(Spain) Andrea Ustero (Spain) Ariana Sánchez	32nd
52.	19 July 2026	(Spain) Málaga P1	(Spain) Paula Josemaría	5–7 / 6–3 / 6–7	(Argentina) Delfina Brea (Spain) Gemma Triay	
53.	6 September 2026	(Spain) Madrid P1	(Spain) Paula Josemaría	7–6 / 3–6 / 3–6	(Argentina) Delfina Brea (Spain) Gemma Triay	
54.	4 October 2025	(Netherlands) Rotterdam P2	(Spain) Paula Josemaría	4–6 / 4–6	(Spain) Andrea Ustero (Spain) Ariana Sánchez	
55.	18 October 2025	(Italy) Milan P1	(Spain) Paula Josemaría	6–7 / 3–6	(Spain) Andrea Ustero (Spain) Ariana Sánchez	
56.	15 November 2026	(United Arab Emirates) Dubai P1	(Spain) Paula Josemaría	5–7 / 1–6	(Spain) Claudia Fernández (Spain) Martina Calvo	

Tournaments won	P2	P1	Major	PP Finals	FIP Pairs World Cup	Total
Tournaments won	9	8	1	1	0	19

=== Padel World Championship ===
N.º	Year	Opponent	Result
1	2022	Argentina	2–0
2	2024	Argentina	2–0
3	2026	Argentina	2–0
