= 2025 Bordeaux P2 =

Padel championships

- Date: 28 June – 6 July
- Edition: 2nd
- Category: P2
- Prize money: €262.250
- Location: Bordeaux, France
- Venue: Patinoire de Mériadeck

Champions
- Men's doubles: (Argentina) Agustín Tapia (Spain) Arturo Coello
- Women's doubles: (Spain) Andrea Ustero (Portugal) Sofia Araujo

Chronology

The 2025 Bordeaux P2 (officially 2025 Premier Padel Betclic Bordeaux P2) was the twelfth tournament of the fourth season organized by Premier Padel, the premier padel circuit, promoted by the International Padel Federation, and with the financial backing of Nasser Al-Khelaïfi's Qatar Sports Investments.

In the women's category, for the first time this season, none of the top three pairs in the FIP rankings reached the finals. In the title match, Andrea Ustero and Sofia Araújo defeated Beatriz Caldera and Carmen Goenaga to claim their first title of the season, both as a team and individually.

In the men's category, the top two ranked pairs met in the finals for the fourth time in 2025. In the decisive match, Agustín Tapia and Arturo Coello defeated Alejandro Galán and Federico Chingotto in straight sets, claiming their sixth title of the season.

== Relevant Data ==
=== Lebrón and Stupaczuk out of Bordeaux ===
Due to physical issues affecting Juan Lebrón, Franco Stupaczuk and Lebrón did not compete in the Bordeaux P2.

=== Ustero becomes the youngest winner of all time ===
By winning the tournament alongside Sofia Araújo, Andrea Ustero became the youngest player in history to claim a professional title, at just 18 years, 1 month, and 24 days old. Ustero had already reached two finals last season, finishing as runner-up at the Paris Major alongside Delfina Brea and at the Dubai P1, where she played with Alejandra Alonso.

With this victory, Ustero also surpassed Claudia Fernández, who previously held the record after winning the 2024 Santiago P1 at the age of 18 years, 2 months, and 4 days, alongside Gemma Triay.

=== The top spot in women's category changes hands again ===
Despite not participating in the event, Gemma Triay reclaimed the top spot in the rankings, once again overtaking Ariana Sánchez and Paula Josemaría.

The reason for this change lies in the difference in points the three players were defending compared to the same week the previous year. As runners-up at the Genoa P2, Ariana and Paula lost 300 points, whereas Gemma retained her current score, as the points from the 2024 Italian tournament semifinal do not count toward her tally of 22 best results.

=== Coello and Tapia continue their strong run ===
With their victory in Bordeaux, Agustín Tapia and Arturo Coello not only secured their 35th title as a pair but also improved their head-to-head record against "Chingalán" to 13 wins and 6 losses. By winning the tie-break, they also maintained a perfect record in match-deciding tie-breaks against Alejandro Galán and Federico Chingotto, having won every tie-break played across their five encounters.

The matches featuring tie-breaks:

- Brussels P2 (2024): 7-4
- Asunción P2 (2024): 7-1
- Madrid P1 (2024): 7-3
- Qatar Major (2025): 7-4
- Bordeaux P2 (2025): 14-12

Of this matches, "ChinGalán" managed only one victory, in Belgium, where they defeated the number ones in three sets.

== Seeds ==
Male

Rnk.	Team	FIP Ranking Points
1	(Argentina) Agustín Tapia (Spain) Arturo Coello	36080
2	(Spain) Alejandro Galán (Argentina) Federico Chingotto	26100
3	(Argentina) Franco Stupaczuk (Spain) Juan Lebrón	16435
4	(Spain) Coki Nieto (Spain) Mike Yanguas	13467
5	(Spain) Jon Sanz (Spain) Momo Gonzalez	10312
6	(Brazil) Lucas Bergamini (Spain) Paquito Navarro	9405
7	(Argentina) Juan Tello (Argentina) Martin Di Nenno	8570
8	(Argentina) Leandro Augsburguer (Spain) Pablo Cardona	6589
9	(Spain) Eduardo Alonso (Spain) Jairo Bautista	6335
10	(Spain) Francisco Guerrero (Spain) Javi Leal	4988
11	(Spain) Javier Garrido (Argentina) Leonel Aguirre	4736
12	(Spain) Alejandro Arroyo (United Arab Emirates) Inigo Jofre	4433
13	(Spain) Javier Barahona (Spain) Javier Garcia Mora	4155
14	(Spain) Alejandro Ruiz (Argentina) Maxi Sánchez	4150
15	(Spain) Jose Garcia Diestro (Spain) Juanlu Esbri	3580
16	(Argentina) Gonzalo Alfonso (Argentina) Sanyo Gutiérrez	3528

Female

Rnk.	Team	FIP Ranking Points
1	(Spain) Ariana Sánchez (Spain) Paula Josemaria	31920
2	(Argentina) Delfina Brea (Spain) Gemma Triay	30560
3	(Spain) Bea González (Spain) Claudia Fernandéz	20470
4	(Spain) Andrea Ustero (Portugal) Sofia Araújo	12645
5	(Spain) Marta Ortega (Spain) Tamara Icardo	11005
6	(Spain) Alejandra Salazar (Spain) Veronica Virseda	9775
7	(Spain) Alejandra Alonso (Argentina) Claudia Jensen	8720
8	(Spain) Lucia Sainz (Spain) Patricia Llaguno	7515
9	(Spain) Jessica Castelló (Spain) Lorena Rufo	5795
10	(Argentina) Aranzazu Osoro (Spain) Martina Calvo	5702
11	(Spain) Beatriz Caldera (Spain) Carmen Goenaga	5489
12	(France) Alix Collombon (Spain) Araceli Martinez	3910
13	(Argentina) Lucia Martinez Gomez (Spain) Marta Marrero	3598
14	(Spain) Marta Barrera (Spain) Marta Caparrós	3584
15	(Spain) Raquel Eugenio Barrera (Argentina) Virginia Riera	3479
16	(Spain) Jimena Velasco (Spain) Noa Canovas	3310

== Head-to-head record between teams ranked in the top 4 during the season ==
=== Man's ===
Record	Coello–Tapia	Galán–Chingotto	Lebrón–Stupaczuk	Coki–Yanguas
Coello–Tapia	—	3–1	2–1	2–0
Galán–Chingotto	1–3	—	3–1	2–0
Lebrón–Stupaczuk	1–2	1–3	—	—
Coki–Yanguas	0–2	0–2	—	—

=== Women's ===
Record	Ariana–Paula	D. Brea–Triay	Gonzalez–Fernandez	Araújo–Ustero	Former Pairs	Araújo–Ortega
Ariana–Paula	—	1–4	7–1	1–0		1–1
D. Brea–Triay	4–1	—	1–4	1–0		3–0
Gonzalez–Fernandez	1–7	4–1	—	—		—
Araújo–Ustero	0–1	0–1	—	—		—
Former Pairs						
Araújo–Ortega	1–1	0–3	—	—		—

Because the Santiago final ended in a draw, it is not counted.

== Draws ==
=== Men's Bracket ===
Round of 32
1	(Spain) Coello / (Argentina) Tapia	6	6
24	(Argentina) J.C. Belluati / (Spain) P. Lijó	3	4
WC	(France) B. Blanque / (France) J. Bergeron	6	4
16	(Argentina) G. Alfonso / (Argentina) Sanyo	7	6
21	(Italy) A. Patiniotis / (Spain) I. Sager	6	1
22	(Spain) A. Cepero / (Argentina) A. Torre	7	4	*
9	(Spain) E. Alonso / (Spain) J. Bautista	6	3	1
5	(Spain) J. Sanz / (Spain) Momo	3	6	6
6	(Brazil) L. Bergamini / (Spain) Paquito	6	6
19	(Spain) D. Sánchez / (Brazil) L. Campagnolo	1	2
11	(Spain) J. Garrido / (Argentina) L. Aguirre	3	6	6
25	(Spain) G. Rubio / (Spain) J. Ruiz	6	3	1
10	(Spain) F. Guerrero / (Spain) J. Leal	6	6
18	(Argentina) A. Chozas / (Argentina) M. Lamperti	2	2
WC	(France) D. Guichard / (France) M. Joris	2	2
4	(Spain) Coki / (Spain) Yanguas	6	6
Q	(United Arab Emirates) A. Ayats / (Spain) P.G. Rodrigo	7	3	4
LL	(Spain) I. Vilariño / (Spain) S. Oria	6	6	1
15	(Spain) J.G. Diestro / (Spain) J. Esbri	6	6
Q	(Spain) A. Goñi / (Spain) J. Munoz	3	2
17	(Spain) F. Gil / (Spain) V. Ruiz	2	2
13	(Spain) J. Barahona / (Spain) J.G. Mora	6	6
14	(Spain) Á. Ruiz / (Argentina) Maxi	6	2
7	(Argentina) J. Tello / (Argentina) Di Nenno	7	6
8	(Argentina) L. Augsburger / (Spain) P. Cardona	6	6
26	(Spain) E. Goenaga / (Spain) L.H. Quesada	2	4
Q	(Spain) P.H. Alvarez / (Argentina) R. Valenzuela	3	2
Q	(Argentina) F. Mouriño / (Spain) J. Martinez	6	6
23	(Spain) J.J. Casas / (Spain) T. Zapata	6	3	3
20	(Portugal) M. Deus / (Portugal) N. Deus	2	6	6
12	(Spain) A. Arroyo / (United Arab Emirates) I. Jofre	6	1	2
2	(Spain) Galán / (Argentina) Chingotto	3	6	6

Round of 16
1	(Spain) Coello / (Argentina) Tapia	2	6	6
16	(Argentina) G. Alfonso / (Argentina) Sanyo	6	3	2
22	(Spain) A. Cepero / (Argentina) A. Torre	1	3
5	(Spain) J. Sanz / (Spain) Momo	6	6
6	(Brazil) L. Bergamini / (Spain) Paquito	6	6
11	(Spain) J. Garrido / (Argentina) L. Aguirre	0	1
10	(Spain) F. Guerrero / (Spain) J. Leal	0	0
4	(Spain) Coki / (Spain) Yanguas	6	6
Q	(United Arab Emirates) A. Ayats / (Spain) P.G. Rodrigo	2	6
15	(Spain) J.G. Diestro / (Spain) J. Esbri	6	7
13	(Spain) J. Barahona / (Spain) J.G. Mora	7	5	0
7	(Argentina) J. Tello / (Argentina) Di Nenno	5	7	6
8	(Argentina) L. Augsburger / (Spain) P. Cardona	6	6
Q	(Argentina) F. Mouriño / (Spain) J. Martinez	4	4
20	(Portugal) M. Deus / (Portugal) N. Deus	2	2
2	(Spain) Galán / (Argentina) Chingotto	6	6

Quarter-Final
1	(Spain) Coello / (Argentina) Tapia	6	6	7
5	(Spain) J. Sanz / (Spain) Momo	3	7	6
6	(Brazil) L. Bergamini / (Spain) Paquito	6	6
4	(Spain) Coki / (Spain) Yanguas	4	4
15	(Spain) J.G. Diestro / (Spain) J. Esbri	6	2
7	(Argentina) J. Tello / (Argentina) Di Nenno	7	6
8	(Argentina) L. Augsburger / (Spain) P. Cardona	5	5
2	(Spain) Galán / (Argentina) Chingotto	7	7

Semi-Finals
1	(Spain) Coello / (Argentina) Tapia	*
6	(Brazil) L. Bergamini / (Spain) Paquito
7	(Argentina) J. Tello / (Argentina) Di Nenno	3	6
2	(Spain) Galán / (Argentina) Chingotto	6	7

Finals
1	(Spain) Coello / (Argentina) Tapia	7	6
2	(Spain) Galán / (Argentina) Chingotto	6	4

=== Women's Bracket ===
Round of 32
1	(Spain) A. Sánchez / (Spain) P. Josemaria
Bye
17	(Russia) K. Sharifova / (Spain) M.R. Abajo	3	1
Q	(Portugal) A. Nogueira / (Argentina) M. Goyeneche	6	6
Q	(Spain) A. Rojo / (Brazil) R. Piltcher	0	2
18	(Spain) M. Talavan / (Spain) T. Navarro	6	6
Bye
7	(Spain) A. Alonso / (Argentina) C. Jensen
5	(Spain) M. Ortega / (Spain) T. Icardo
Bye
9	(Spain) J. Castelló / (Spain) L. Rufo	7	6
19	(Spain) C. Mesa / (Spain) S. Ruiz	5	2
12	(France) A. Collombon / (Spain) A. Martinez	6	6
Q	(Spain) J. Cabruja / (Spain) M. Arellano	2	3
Bye
4	(Spain) A. Ustero / (Portugal) S. Araújo
3	(Spain) B. González / (Spain) C. Fernandéz
Bye
13	(Spain) L. Martinez / (Spain) M. Marrero	6	4
15	(Spain) R. Barrera / (Argentina) V. Riera	7	6
Q	(Italy) L. Vano / (Spain) L. Exposito	2	2
14	(Spain) M. Barrera / (Spain) M. Caparrós	6	6
Bye
8	(Spain) L. Sainz / (Spain) P. Llaguno
6	(Spain) A. Salazar / (Spain) V. Virseda
Bye
10	(Argentina) A. Osoro / (Spain) M. Calvo	6	6
16	(Spain) J. Velasco / (Spain) N. Canovas	4	2
WC	(Spain) L. Rodriguez / (France) L. Godallier	6	1
11	(Spain) B. Caldera / (Spain) C. Goenaga	7	6
Bye
LL	(Argentina) D. Valenzuela / (Spain) S. Pujals

Round of 16
1	(Spain) A. Sánchez / (Spain) P. Josemaria	6	6
Q	(Portugal) A. Nogueira / (Argentina) M. Goyeneche	1	1
18	(Spain) M. Talavan / (Spain) T. Navarro	3	4
7	(Spain) A. Alonso / (Argentina) C. Jensen	6	6
5	(Spain) M. Ortega / (Spain) T. Icardo	3	1
9	(Spain) J. Castelló / (Spain) L. Rufo	6	6
12	(France) A. Collombon / (Spain) A. Martinez	4	4
4	(Spain) A. Ustero / (Portugal) S. Araújo	6	6
3	(Spain) B. González / (Spain) C. Fernandéz	6	6
15	(Spain) R. Barrera / (Argentina) V. Riera	2	3
14	(Spain) M. Barrera / (Spain) M. Caparrós	4	6
8	(Spain) L. Sainz / (Spain) P. Llaguno	6	7
6	(Spain) A. Salazar / (Spain) V. Virseda	2	2
10	(Argentina) A. Osoro / (Spain) M. Calvo	6	6
11	(Spain) B. Caldera / (Spain) C. Goenaga	6	6
LL	(Argentina) D. Valenzuela / (Spain) S. Pujals	2	1

Quarter-Final
1	(Spain) A. Sánchez / (Spain) P. Josemaria	2	3
7	(Spain) A. Alonso / (Argentina) C. Jensen	6	6
9	(Spain) J. Castelló / (Spain) L. Rufo	3	1
4	(Spain) A. Ustero / (Portugal) S. Araújo	6	6
3	(Spain) B. González / (Spain) C. Fernandéz	6	6
8	(Spain) L. Sainz / (Spain) P. Llaguno	3	2
10	(Argentina) A. Osoro / (Spain) M. Calvo	0	4
11	(Spain) B. Caldera / (Spain) C. Goenaga	6	6

Semi-Finals
7	(Spain) A. Alonso / (Argentina) C. Jensen	4	0
4	(Spain) A. Ustero / (Portugal) S. Araújo	6	0	*
3	(Spain) B. González / (Spain) C. Fernandéz	3	2
11	(Spain) B. Caldera / (Spain) C. Goenaga	6	6

Finals
4	(Spain) A. Ustero / (Portugal) S. Araújo	7	2	6
11	(Spain) B. Caldera / (Spain) C. Goenaga	5	6	2

== Results ==
=== Round of 32 ===
Men's

Date	Winners	Score	Opponent	Refs.
1/7/2025	(Argentina) Agustín Tapia (Spain) Arturo Coello	6–3 / 6–4	(Argentina) Juan Cruz Belluati (Spain) Pablo Lijó	
30/6/2025	(Argentina) Gonzalo Alfonso (Argentina) Sanyo Gutiérrez	7–6 / 6–4	(France) Bastien Blanque (France) Johan Bergeron	
30/6/2025	(Spain) Alvero Cepero (Argentina) Eduardo Agustin Torre	7–6 / 4–1 / W.O.	(Italy) Aris Patiniotis (Spain) Ignacio Sager	
30/6/2025	(Spain) Jon Sanz (Spain) Momo Gonzalez	3–6 / 6–3 / 6–1	(Spain) Eduardo Alonso (Spain) Jairo Bautista	
1/7/2025	(Brazil) Lucas Bergamini (Spain) Paquito Navarro	6–1 / 6–2	(Spain) David Gala Sanchez (Brazil) Lucas Campagnolo	
1/7/2025	(Spain) Javier Garrido (Argentina) Leonel Aguirre	3–6 / 6–3 / 6–1	(Spain) Gonzalo Rubio (Spain) Javi Ruiz	
1/7/2025	(Spain) Francisco Guerrero (Spain) Javier Leal	6–2 / 6–2	(Argentina) Alex Chozas (Argentina) Miguel Lamperti	
30/6/2025	(Spain) Coki Nieto (Spain) Mike Yanguas	6–2 / 6–2	(France) Dylan Guichard (France) Maxime Joris	
30/6/2025	(United Arab Emirates) Arnau Ayats (Spain) Jose Rico	7–6 / 3–6 / 4–1 / W.O.	(Spain) Ignacio Vilariño (Spain) Salvador Oria	
1/7/2025	(Spain) Jose García Diestro (Spain) Juanlu Esbri	6–3 / 6–2	(Spain) Aimar Goñi (Spain) Jaime Muñoz	
30/6/2025	(Spain) Francisco Gil Morales (Spain) Victor Ruiz	6–2 / 6–2	(Spain) Javier Barahona (Spain) Javier García Mora	
1/7/2025	(Argentina) Juan Tello (Argentina) Martin Di Nenno	7–6 / 6–2	(Spain) Álex Ruiz (Argentina) Maxi Sánchez	
30/6/2025	(Argentina) Leandro Augsburger (Spain) Pablo Cardona	6–2 / 6–4	(Spain) Enrique Goenaga (Spain) Luis Hernandez Quesada	
1/7/2025	(Argentina) Federico Mouriño (Spain) Javier Martinez Vazquez	6–3 / 6–2	(Spain) Pol Hernandez (Argentina) Ramiro Valenzuela	
30/6/2025	(Portugal) Miguel Deus (Portugal) Nuno Deus	2–6 / 6–3 / 6–3	(Spain) Jose Jimenez Casas (Spain) Teodoro Zapata	
1/7/2025	(Spain) Alejandro Galán (Argentina) Federico Chingotto	3–6 / 6–1 / 6–2	(Spain) Alex Arroyo (United Arab Emirates) Iñigo Jofre	

Women's

Date	Winners	Score	Opponent	Refs.
1/7/2025	(Portugal) Ana Catarina Nogueira (Argentina) Martina Fassio Goyeneche'	6–3 / 6–1	(Russia) Ksenia Sharifova (Spain) Laia Rodriguez Abajo	
1/7/2025	(Spain) Marta Talavan (Spain) Teresa Navarro	6–0 / 6–2	(Spain) Alicia Blanco Rojo (Brazil) Raquel Piltcher	
30/6/2025	(Spain) Jessica Castelló (Spain) Lorena Rufo	7–5 / 6–2	(Spain) Carla Mesa (Spain) Sara Ruiz Soto	
1/7/2025	(France) Alix Collombon (Spain) Araceli Martinez	6–2 / 6–3	(Spain) Jana Montes (Spain) Marta Arellano	
30/6/2025	(Spain) Raquel Eugenio Barrera (Argentina) Virginia Riera	7–6 / 6–4	(Spain) Lucia Martinez Gomez (Spain) Marta Marrero	
1/7/2025	(Spain) Marta Barrera (Spain) Marta Caparrós	6–2 / 6–2	(Italy) Lorena Vano (Spain) Lucía Peralta	
1/7/2025	(Argentina) Aranzazu Osoro (Spain) Martina Calvo	6–4 / 6–2	(Spain) Jimena Velasco (Spain) Noa Canovas	
1/7/2025	(Spain) Beatriz Caldera (Spain) Carmen Goenaga	7–6 / 6–1	(Spain) Laura Lujan Rodriguez (France) Lea Godallier	

=== Round of 16 ===
Men's

Date	Winners	Score	Opponent	Refs.
2/7/2025	(Argentina) Agustín Tapia (Spain) Arturo Coello	2–6 / 6–3 / 6–2	(Argentina) Gonzalo Alfonso (Argentina) Sanyo Gutiérrez	
2/7/2025	(Spain) Jon Sanz (Spain) Momo Gonzalez	6–1 / 6–3	(Spain) Alvero Cepero (Argentina) Eduardo Agustin Torre	
3/7/2025	(Brazil) Lucas Bergamini (Spain) Paquito Navarro	6–0 / 6–1	(Spain) Javier Garrido (Argentina) Leonel Aguirre	
2/7/2025	(Spain) Coki Nieto (Spain) Mike Yanguas	6–0 / 6–0	(Spain) Francisco Guerrero (Spain) Javier Leal	
3/7/2025	(Spain) Jose García Diestro (Spain) Juanlu Esbri	6–2 / 7–6	(United Arab Emirates) Arnau Ayats (Spain) Jose Rico	
2/7/2025	(Argentina) Juan Tello (Argentina) Martin Di Nenno	5–7 / 7–5 / 6–0	(Spain) Francisco Gil Morales (Spain) Victor Ruiz	
2/7/2025	(Argentina) Leandro Augsburger (Spain) Pablo Cardona	6–4 / 6–4	(Argentina) Federico Mouriño (Spain) Javier Martinez Vazquez	
3/7/2025	(Spain) Alejandro Galán (Argentina) Federico Chingotto	6–2 / 6–2	(Portugal) Miguel Deus (Portugal) Nuno Deus	

Women's

Date	Winners	Score	Opponent	Refs.
3/7/2025	(Spain) Ariana Sánchez (Spain) Paula Josemaría	6–1 / 6–1	(Portugal) Ana Catarina Nogueira (Argentina) Martina Fassio Goyeneche	
2/7/2025	(Spain) Alejandra Alonso (Argentina) Claudia Jensen	6–3 / 6–4	(Spain) Marta Talavan (Spain) Teresa Navarro	
2/7/2025	(Spain) Jessica Castelló (Spain) Lorena Rufo	6–3 / 6–1	(Spain) Marta Ortega (Spain) Tamara Icardo	
2/7/2025	(Spain) Andrea Ustero (Portugal) Sofia Araújo	6–4 / 6–4	(France) Alix Collombon (Spain) Araceli Martinez	
3/7/2025	(Spain) Bea González (Spain) Claudia Fernández	6–2 / 6–3	(Spain) Raquel Eugenio Barrera (Argentina) Virginia Riera	
3/7/2025	(Spain) Lucia Sainz (Spain) Patricia Llaguno	6–4 / 7–6	(Spain) Marta Barrera (Spain) Marta Caparrós	
3/7/2025	(Argentina) Aranzazu Osoro (Spain) Martina Calvo	6–2 / 6–2	(Spain) Alejandra Salazar (Spain) Verónica Virseda	
3/7/2025	(Spain) Beatriz Caldera (Spain) Carmen Goenaga	6–2 / 6–1	(Argentina) Daiara Valenzuela (Spain) Sara Pujals	

=== Quarter-Finals ===
Men's

Date	Winners	Score	Opponent	Refs.
4/7/2025	(Argentina) Agustín Tapia (Spain) Arturo Coello	6–3 / 6–7 / 7–6	(Spain) Jon Sanz (Spain) Momo Gonzalez	
4/7/2025	(Brazil) Lucas Bergamini (Spain) Paquito Navarro	6–4 / 6–4	(Spain) Coki Nieto (Spain) Mike Yanguas	
4/7/2025	(Argentina) Juan Tello (Argentina) Martin Di Nenno	7–6 / 6–2	(Spain) Jose García Diestro (Spain) Juanlu Esbri	
4/7/2025	(Spain) Alejandro Galán (Argentina) Federico Chingotto	7–5 / 7–5	(Argentina) Leandro Augsburger (Spain) Pablo Cardona	

Women's

Date	Winners	Score	Opponent	Refs.
4/7/2025	(Spain) Alejandra Alonso (Argentina) Claudia Jensen	6–2 / 6–3	(Spain) Ariana Sánchez (Spain) Paula Josemaría	
4/7/2025	(Spain) Andrea Ustero (Portugal) Sofia Araújo	6–3 / 6–1	(Spain) Jessica Castelló (Spain) Lorena Rufo	
4/7/2025	(Spain) Bea González (Spain) Claudia Fernández	6–3 / 6–2	(Spain) Lucia Sainz (Spain) Patricia Llaguno	
4/7/2025	(Spain) Beatriz Caldera (Spain) Carmen Goenaga	6–0 / 6–4	(Argentina) Aranzazu Osoro (Spain) Martina Calvo	

=== Semi-Finals ===
Men's

Date	Winners	Score	Opponent	Refs.
5/7/2025	(Argentina) Agustín Tapia (Spain) Arturo Coello	W.O.	(Brazil) Lucas Bergamini (Spain) Paquito Navarro	
5/7/2025	(Spain) Alejandro Galán (Argentina) Federico Chingotto	6–3 / 7–6	(Argentina) Juan Tello (Argentina) Martin Di Nenno	

Women's

Date	Winners	Score	Opponent	Refs.
5/7/2025	(Spain) Andrea Ustero (Portugal) Sofia Araújo	6–4 / W.O.	(Spain) Alejandra Alonso (Argentina) Claudia Jensen	
5/7/2025	(Spain) Beatriz Caldera (Spain) Carmen Goenaga	6–3 / 6–2	(Spain) Bea González (Spain) Claudia Fernández	

=== Finals ===
Men's

Date	Winners	Score	Opponent	Refs.
6/7/2025	(Argentina) Agustín Tapia (Spain) Arturo Coello	7–6 / 6–4	(Spain) Alejandro Galán (Argentina) Federico Chingotto	

Women's

Date	Winners	Score	Opponent	Refs.
6/7/2025	(Spain) Andrea Ustero (Portugal) Sofia Araújo	7–5 / 2–6 / 6–2	(Spain) Beatriz Caldera (Spain) Carmen Goenaga	
