= 2024 Paris Major =

Padel championships

- Date: 28 September – 6 October
- Edition: 3rd
- Category: Major
- Prize money: €525.000 (Men's) €501.375 (Women's)
- Location: Valladolid, Spain
- Venue: Stade Roland Garros

Champions
- Men's doubles: (Argentina) Agustín Tapia (Spain) Arturo Coello
- Women's doubles: (Spain) Ariana Sánchez (Spain) Paula Josemaría

Chronology

The 2024 Paris Major (officially 2024 Greenweez Paris Major Premier Padel) was the eighteenth tournament of the third season organized by Premier Padel, promoted by the International Padel Federation, and with the financial backing of Nasser Al-Khelaïfi's Qatar Sports Investments, now serving as the premier padel circuit.

In the women's category, the fourth-ranked pair of Andrea Ustero and Delfina Brea reached the finals, where they faced and were defeated by Ariana Sánchez and Paula Josemaría, who claimed their eighth title of 2024 and their 35th overall as a pair.

In the men's category, the top two pairs in the FIP rankings faced each other for the fourth consecutive tournament. Agustín Tapia and Arturo Coello played their fifteenth final of the season and defeated Alejandro Galán and Federico Chingotto for the fourth time since the summer break, securing their tenth title of 2024 and their twenty-fifth overall as a pair.

== Relevant Data ==
=== New chapter in Galán Vs. Lebrón ===
The clash between Di Nenno/Lebrón and Galán/Chingotto marked the second time, out of a possible 15 tournaments since the split between Alejandro Galán and Juan Lebrón, that they faced each other. The number two pair repeated their Genoa P2 victory to reach the finals, marking the 70th finals appearance of Alejandro Galán's career.

=== The "Golden Boys'" 25th title ===
Meanwhile, with their victory in the finals, Coello and Tapia claimed their 25th title across 46 tournaments played and 33 finals contested.

=== New record ===
In the women's category, Ariana Sánchez and Paula Josemaría broke their own record by winning their 35th title as a pair.

== Seeds ==
Male

Rnk.	Team	FIP Ranking Points
1	(Argentina) Agustín Tapia (Spain) Arturo Coello	29962
2	(Spain) Alejandro Galán (Argentina) Federico Chingotto	23415
3	(Spain) Juan Lebrón (Argentina) Martin Di Nenno	16409
4	(Argentina) Franco Stupaczuk (Spain) Miguel Yanguas	11825
5	(Spain) Pablo Cardona (Spain) Paquito Navarro	8869
6	(Spain) Coki Nieto (Spain) Jon Sanz	7157
7	(Spain) Javi Garrido (Brazil) Lucas Bergamini	6568
8	(Spain) Eduardo Alonso (Spain) Momo Gonzalez	6538
9	(Spain) Alejandro Arroyo (Spain) Alejandro Ruiz	5660
10	(Argentina) Sanyo Gutiérrez (Spain) Victor Ruiz	5237
11	(Argentina) Fernando Belasteguín (Argentina) Valentino Libaak	4853
12	(Argentina) Lucho Capra (Argentina) Maxi Sanchéz	4128
13	(United Arab Emirates) Inigo Jofre (Argentina) Juan Tello	3814
14	(Spain) Javier Leal (Brazil) Lucas Campagnolo	3502
15	(Spain) Francisco Gil Morales (Spain) Juanlu Esbri	3088
16	(Argentina) Alex Chozas (Argentina) Leandro Augsburguer	3061

Female

Rnk.	Team	FIP Ranking Points
1	(Spain) Ariana Sanchez (Spain) Paula Josemaria	28036
2	(Spain) Claudia Fernandez (Spain) Gemma Triay	18930
3	(Spain) Marta Ortega (Portugal) Sofia Araújo	11571
4	(Spain) Andrea Ustero (Argentina) Delfina Brea	10648
5	(Spain) Lucia Sainz (Spain) Patty Llaguno	9848
6	(Spain) Alejandra Salazar (Spain) Jessica Castello	9402
7	(Argentina) Claudia Jensen (Spain) Tamara Icardo	8462
8	(Argentina) Aranzazu Osoro (Spain) Veronica Virseda	6753
9	(Spain) Carmen Goenaga (Argentina) Virginia Riera	5675
10	(Russia) Ksenia Sharifova (Spain) Lucia Martinez	3546
11	(Spain) Beatriz Caldera (Spain) Lorena Rufo	3406
12	(Italy) Carolina Orsi (Spain) Nuria Rodriguez	3400
13	(Spain) Marina Guinart (Spain) Victoria Iglesias	3256
14	(Spain) Alejandra Alonso (Spain) Jana Montes Cabruja	2669
15	(Spain) Carla Mesa (Spain) Sara Ruiz	2537
16	(Spain) Barbara Las Heras (Spain) Marta Marrero	2482

== Head-to-head record between teams ranked in the top 4 during the season ==
=== Man's ===
Record	Coello–Tapia	Galán–Chingotto	Lebrón–Di Nenno	Stupaczuk–Yanguas	Former Pairs	Galán–Lebrón	Paquito–Sanyo	Lebrón–Paquito	Di Nenno–Stupaczuk
Coello–Tapia	—	8–5	2–0	1–0		1–1	2–0	4–0	1–0
Galán–Chingotto	5–8	—	1–0	1–0		—	—	1–0	7–0
Lebrón–Di Nenno	0–2	0–1	—	—		—	—	—	—
Stupaczuk–Yanguas	0–1	0–1	—	—		—	—	—	—
Former Pairs									
Galán–Lebrón	1–1	—	—	—		—	—	—	2–0
Paquito–Sanyo	0–2	—	—	—		—	—	—	—
Lebrón–Paquito	0–4	0–1	—	—		—	—	—	0–1
Di Nenno–Stupaczuk	0–1	0–7	—	—		0–2	—	1–0	—

=== Women's ===
Record	Ariana–Paula	Fernandez–Triay	Gonzalez–D. Brea	Araújo–Ortega	Former Pairs	Icardo–Salazar	Ortega–Triay	Ortega–Virseda
Ariana–Paula	—	5–5	2–1	2–1		1–0	—	1–0
Fernandez–Triay	5–5	—	2–3	1–0		0–1	—	1–0
B. Gonzalez–D. Brea	1–2	3–2	—	1–0		3–0	—	—
Araújo–Ortega	1–2	0–1	0–1	—		—	—	—
Former Pairs								
Icardo–Salazar	0–1	1–0	0–3	—		—	—	—
Ortega–Triay	—	—	—	—		—	—	—
Ortega–Virseda	0–1	0–1	—	—		—	—	—

Matchups involving Andrea Ustero and Delfina Brea, and subsequently Delfina Brea and Lucia Sainz, are not included, as these were merely temporary pairings that lasted for a total of three tournaments while Bea González was recovering from an injury.

== Draws ==
=== Men's Bracket ===
Round of 32
1	(Spain) Coello / (Argentina) Tapia	6	6
Q	(Spain) J.F. Delgado / (Italy) S. Cremona	1	0
Q	(Portugal) A. Luque / (Spain) T. Bueno	4	6
13	(United Arab Emirates) I. Jofre / (Argentina) J. Tello	6	7
16	(Argentina) A. Chozas / (Argentina) L. Augsburger	6	6	6
42	(Spain) Á. Amaya / (Argentina) C.G. Gutierrez	7	2	7
23	(Spain) J.G. Diestro / (Spain) J.G. Mora	3	2
6	(Spain) Coki / (Spain) J. Sanz	6	6
5	(Spain) P. Cardona / (Spain) Paquito	7	7
21	(Spain) I. Sager / (Spain) S. Oria	6	6
WC	(France) B. Blanque / (France) J. Bergeron	2	3
12	(Argentina) L. Capra / (Argentina) Maxi	6	6
38	(Spain) I. Vilariño / (Spain) M. Del Castillo	7	7
29	(Italy) D. Perino / (Spain) V. Mena	6	6
31	(Spain) I. Ramirez / (Spain) J. Marmolejo	2	3
4	(Argentina) Stupaczuk / (Spain) Yanguas	6	6
3	(Argentina) Di Nenno / (Spain) Lebrón	6	6
Q	(Spain) F. Ramirez / (Spain) R. Mendez	2	2
19	(Spain) J. Rico / (Spain) L.H. Quesada	7	6
22	(Argentina) J.C. Belluati / (Argentina) R. Moyano	5	3
15	(Spain) F. Gil / (Spain) J. Esbri	7	6
WC	(Argentina) I. Piotto / (France) T. Leygue	6	2
26	(United Arab Emirates) A. Ayats / (Spain) E. Goenaga	3	6	1
8	(Spain) E. Alonso / (Spain) Momo	6	3	6
7	(Spain) J. Garrido / (Brazil) L. Bergamini	6	6
25	(Argentina) A. Gutiérrez / (Spain) J. Rico	3	2
44	(Spain) A. Martinez / (Spain) J. Gonzalez	5	0
37	(Argentina) F. Mouriño / (Spain) M. Quilez	7	4	*
36	(Italy) F. Dominguez / (Spain) M. Hernandez	7	3	2
39	(Italy) A. Patiniotis / (Spain) J. Moya	6	6	6
24	(Spain) A. Cepero / (Spain) M. Benitez	2	0
2	(Spain) Galán / (Argentina) F. Chingotto	6	6

Round of 16
1	(Spain) Coello / (Argentina) Tapia	6	6
13	(United Arab Emirates) I. Jofre / (Argentina) J. Tello	2	1
16	(Argentina) A. Chozas / (Argentina) L. Augsburger	2	2
6	(Spain) Coki / (Spain) J. Sanz	6	6
5	(Spain) P. Cardona / (Spain) Paquito	7	2	6
12	(Argentina) L. Capra / (Argentina) Maxi	6	6	4
38	(Spain) I. Vilariño / (Spain) M. Del Castillo	4	1
4	(Argentina) Stupaczuk / (Spain) Yanguas	6	6	*
3	(Argentina) Di Nenno / (Spain) Lebrón	6	6
19	(Spain) J. Rico / (Spain) L.H. Quesada	3	3
15	(Spain) F. Gil / (Spain) J. Esbri	4	7	2
8	(Spain) E. Alonso / (Spain) Momo	6	6	6
7	(Spain) J. Garrido / (Brazil) L. Bergamini	6	6
37	(Argentina) F. Mouriño / (Spain) M. Quilez	2	2
39	(Italy) A. Patiniotis / (Spain) J. Moya	4	3
2	(Spain) Galán / (Argentina) F. Chingotto	6	6

Quarter-Final
1	(Spain) Coello / (Argentina) Tapia	6	6
6	(Spain) Coki / (Spain) J. Sanz	1	3
5	(Spain) P. Cardona / (Spain) Paquito	6	4
4	(Argentina) Stupaczuk / (Spain) Yanguas	7	6
3	(Argentina) Di Nenno / (Spain) Lebrón	5	6	6
8	(Spain) E. Alonso / (Spain) Momo	7	4	1
7	(Spain) J. Garrido / (Brazil) L. Bergamini	0	2
2	(Spain) Galán / (Argentina) F. Chingotto	6	6

Semi-Finals
1	(Spain) Coello / (Argentina) Tapia	6	6
4	(Argentina) Stupaczuk / (Spain) Yanguas	3	4
3	(Argentina) Di Nenno / (Spain) Lebrón	2	2
2	(Spain) Galán / (Argentina) F. Chingotto	6	6

Finals
1	(Spain) Coello / (Argentina) Tapia	6	6
2	(Spain) Galán / (Argentina) F. Chingotto	2	1

=== Women's Bracket ===
Round of 32
1	(Spain) A. Sanchez / (Spain) P. Josemaria	6	6
21	(Portugal) A. Nogueira / (Spain) M. Borrero	2	2
24	(Spain) A. Perez / (Spain) P. Martinez	3	4
13	(Spain) M. Guinart / (Spain) V. Iglesias	6	6
11	(Spain) B. Caldera / (Spain) L. Rufo	6	6
27	(Spain) N. Aguilar / (Spain) T. Navarro	3	4
19	(Spain) E. Carnicero / (Spain) M. Merino	0	3
5	(Spain) L. Sainz / (Spain) P. Llaguno	6	6
8	(Argentina) A. Osoro / (Spain) V. Virseda	6	6
33	(Brazil) M. Schuck / (Spain) M. Rivas	1	3
22	(Spain) M.R. Abajo / (Spain) S. Bellver	3	3
10	(Russia) K. Sharifova / (Spain) L. Martinez	6	6
9	(Spain) C. Goenaga / (Argentina) V. Riera	6	6
18	(Argentina) J. Bidahorria / (Spain) M. Talavan	0	3
23	(Spain) M. Lobo / (Spain) S. Saiz	1	2
3	(Spain) M. Ortega / (Portugal) S. Araújo	6	6
4	(Spain) A. Ustero / (Argentina) D. Brea	6	6
34	(Spain) C. Castillon / (Portugal) P. Ribeiro	0	0
29	(Spain) M. Barrera / (Spain) M. Caparros	6	4	3
14	(Spain) A. Alonso / (Spain) J. Cabruja	4	6	6
16	(Spain) B. Las Heras / (Spain) M. Marrero	6	6
38	(Spain) L.L. Rodriguez / (Spain) M. Navarro	2	2
Q	(Netherlands) M. Koek / (Spain) R. Lopez	2	1
7	(Argentina) C. Jensen / (Spain) T. Icardo	6	6
6	(Spain) A. Salazar / (Spain) J. Castello	7	6
Q	(Spain) M. Santamaria / (Spain) S. Pujals	6	2
25	(Italy) G. Marchetti / (France) L. Godallier	6	0	3
15	(Spain) C. Mesa / (Spain) S. Ruiz	4	6	6
12	(Italy) C. Orsi / (Spain) N. Rodriguez	4	3
17	(France) A. Collombon / (Spain) A. Martinez	6	6
20	(Spain) J. Velasco / (Spain) N. Canovas	1	1
2	(Spain) C. Fernandez / (Spain) G. Triay	6	6

Round of 16
1	(Spain) A. Sanchez / (Spain) P. Josemaria	4	6	6
13	(Spain) M. Guinart / (Spain) V. Iglesias	6	1	0
11	(Spain) B. Caldera / (Spain) L. Rufo	2	5
5	(Spain) L. Sainz / (Spain) P. Llaguno	6	7
8	(Argentina) A. Osoro / (Spain) V. Virseda	7	6
10	(Russia) K. Sharifova / (Spain) L. Martinez	6	0
9	(Spain) C. Goenaga / (Argentina) V. Riera	6	2
3	(Spain) M. Ortega / (Portugal) S. Araújo	7	6
4	(Spain) A. Ustero / (Argentina) D. Brea	6	6
14	(Spain) A. Alonso / (Spain) J. Cabruja	1	2
16	(Spain) B. Las Heras / (Spain) M. Marrero	3	1
7	(Argentina) C. Jensen / (Spain) T. Icardo	6	6
6	(Spain) A. Salazar / (Spain) J. Castello	6	6
15	(Spain) C. Mesa / (Spain) S. Ruiz	1	4
17	(France) A. Collombon / (Spain) A. Martinez	2	0
2	(Spain) C. Fernandez / (Spain) G. Triay	6	6

Quarter-Final
1	(Spain) A. Sanchez / (Spain) P. Josemaria	6	6
5	(Spain) L. Sainz / (Spain) P. Llaguno	1	2
8	(Argentina) A. Osoro / (Spain) V. Virseda	6	6
3	(Spain) M. Ortega / (Portugal) S. Araújo	2	2
4	(Spain) A. Ustero / (Argentina) D. Brea	5	6	6
7	(Argentina) C. Jensen / (Spain) T. Icardo	7	2	3
6	(Spain) A. Salazar / (Spain) J. Castello	4	7	6
2	(Spain) C. Fernandez / (Spain) G. Triay	6	6	3

Semi-Finals
1	(Spain) A. Sanchez / (Spain) P. Josemaria	6	3	6
8	(Argentina) A. Osoro / (Spain) V. Virseda	2	6	3
4	(Spain) A. Ustero / (Argentina) D. Brea	6	4	6
2	(Spain) C. Fernandez / (Spain) G. Triay	4	6	0

Finals
1	(Spain) A. Sanchez / (Spain) P. Josemaria	6	6
4	(Spain) A. Ustero / (Argentina) D. Brea	4	0

== Results ==
=== First Round ===
Men's

Date	Winners	Score	Opponent	Refs.
1/10/2024	(Spain) Jaime Fermosell (Italy) Simone Cremona	7–6 / 6–2	(Spain) Adrian Marques (Spain) Gerard Arnaldos	
1/10/2024	(Portugal) Antonio Luque (Spain) Toni Bueno	7–6 / 6–4	(Spain) Emilio Sanchez Chamero (Spain) Pablo García Rodrigo	
1/10/2024	(United Arab Emirates) Iñigo Jofre (Argentina) Juan Tello	6–3 / 4–6 / 6–3	(Spain) Mario Ortega (Spain) Miguel Gonzalez García	
30/9/2024	(Argentina) Alex Chozas (Argentina) Leandro Augsburger	6–1 / 3–6 / 7–6	(Spain) Gonzalo Rubio (Spain) Pablo Lijó	
30/9/2024	(Spain) Álvaro Melendez Amaya (Argentina) Cristian German Gutiérrez	6–3 / 7–6	(Spain) Jorge Ruiz Gutiérrez (Spain) Miguel Semmler	
30/9/2024	(Spain) Jose García Diestro (Spain) Javier García Mora	6–7 / 7–6 / 6–2	(Italy) Flavio Abbate (Italy) Giulio Graziotti	
30/9/2024	(Spain) Ignacio Sager (Spain) Salvador Oria	6–2 / 6–1	(France) Maxime Joris (France) Thomas Vanbauce	
30/9/2024	(France) Bastien Blanque (France) Johan Bergeron	4–6 / 6–2 / 7–5	(Spain) Diego Gil Batista (Spain) Jose Sanchez Serrano	
30/9/2024	(Argentina) Lucho Capra (Argentina) Maxi Sánchez	6–3 / 4–6 / 6–3	(Spain) Francisco Guerrero (Spain) Jairo Bautista	
30/9/2024	(Spain) Ignacio Vilariño (Spain) Mario Del Castillo	6–4 / 6–7 / 7–6	(Spain) Javier Leal (Brazil) Lucas Campagnolo	
30/9/2024	(Italy) Denis Perino (Spain) Victor Mena Gil	6–3 / 6–1	(Spain) Aitor Garcia Bassas (Spain) Miguel Angel Solbes	
30/9/2024	(Spain) Ivan Ramirez (Spain) Jose Solano Marmolejo	6–4 / 7–5	(Spain) Carlos Marti (Spain) Pedro Melendez Amaya	
1/10/2024	(Spain) Fran Ramirez (Spain) Rafael Méndez	6–4 / 6–2	(Spain) Adrian Ronco Lopez (Spain) Carlos Perez Cabeza	
1/10/2024	(Spain) Javier Rico (Spain) Luis Hernandez Quesada	6–4 / 7–5	(Spain) David Gala Sanchez (Spain) Jaime Muñoz	
1/10/2024	(Argentina) Juan Cruz Belluati (Argentina) Ramiro Moyano	6–4 / 6–7 / 6–1	(Argentina) Sanyo Gutiérrez (Spain) Victor Ruiz	
1/10/2024	(Spain) Francisco Gil Morales (Spain) Juanlu Esbri	6–1 / 4–6 / 6–1	(Spain) Javier Gonzalez Barahona (Spain) Teodoro Zapata	
30/9/2024	(Argentina) Ignacio Piotto (France) Thomas Leygue	7–6 / 6–2	(Spain) Pol Hernandez (Argentina) Ramiro Valenzuela	
30/9/2024	(United Arab Emirates) Arnau Ayats (Spain) Enrique Goenaga	7–6 / 6–1	(Spain) Daniel Santigosa (Argentina) Miguel Lamperti	
30/9/2024	(Argentina) Agustín Gutiérrez (Spain) José Rico	6–2 / 6–4	(Spain) Javier Bravo Alvarez (Spain) Javier Ruiz Gonzalez	
1/10/2024	(Spain) Alonso Rodriguez (Spain) Jose Luis Gonzalez	7–6 / 7–6	(Sweden) Daniel Windahl (Chile) Javier Valdes	
1/10/2024	(Argentina) Federico Mouriño (Spain) Marc Quilez	6–3 / 6–7 / 7–5	(Argentina) Fernando Belasteguín (Argentina) Valentino Libaak	
1/10/2024	(Italy) Facundo Dominguez (Spain) Mario Huete	2–6 / 7–6 / 6–2	(Spain) Alex Arroyo (Spain) Aléx Ruiz	
1/10/2024	(Italy) Aris Patiniotis (Spain) Jesus Moya	7–5 / 6–1	(Spain) José Jimenez Casas (Spain) Pincho Fernandez	
30/9/2024	(Spain) Alvero Cepero (Spain) Miguel Benítez	7–6 / 6–0	(Belgium) Clement Geens (France) Dylan Guichard	

Women's

Date	Winners	Score	Opponent	Refs.
1/10/2024	(Portugal) Ana Catarina Nogueira (Spain) Marta Borrero	6–3 / 7–6	(Spain) Arantxa Soriano (Spain) Letizia Manquillo	
1/10/2024	(Spain) Agueda Perez (Spain) Patricia Martínez	6–0 / 6–1	(Spain) Alicia Blanco Rojo (Spain) Carla Castillo Velarde	
30/9/2024	(Spain) Noemi Aguilar (Spain) Teresa Navarro	6–0 / 6–4	(Spain) Ana Dominguez Gracia (Spain) Lucía García Trella	
30/9/2024	(Spain) Esther Carnicero (Spain) Melania Merino Saez	6–1 / 6–2	(Italy) Emily Stellato (Italy) Giulia Sussarello	
30/9/2024	(Brazil) Manuela Schuck (Spain) Mónica Gomez Rivas	4–6 / 6–1 / 6–3	(Spain) Nuria Vivancos (Spain) Xenia Clasca	
30/9/2024	(Spain) Laia Rodriguez Abajo (Spain) Sandra Bellver	6–4 / 6–3	(Spain) Ariadna Cañellas (Sweden) Carolina Navarro	
30/9/2024	(Argentina) Julieta Bidahorria (Spain) Marta Talavan	6–1 / 2–0 / W.O.	(France) Carla Touly (France) Jessica Ginier	
30/9/2024	(Spain) Marina Martinez Lobo (Spain) Sofía Saiz Vallejo	6–4 / 6–4	(Italy) Carlotta Casali (Italy) Lorena Vano	
30/9/2024	(Spain) Carmen Castillon (Portugal) Patricia Ribeiro	2–6 / 7–5 / 4–3 / W.O.	(Spain) Alba Perez Momha (Spain) Raquel Segura Aguilar	
30/9/2024	(Spain) Marta Barrera (Spain) Marta Caparrós	6–1 / 6–2	(Spain) Camila Fassio Goyeneche (Netherlands) Stephanie Weterings	
30/9/2024	(Spain) Laura Lujan Rodriguez (Spain) Marta Arellano Navarro	6–2 / 6–1	(Spain) Ana Varo Ramos (Spain) Lucía Peralta	
30/9/2024	(Netherlands) Marcella Koek (Netherlands) Rebeca Lopez	6–1 / 6–7 / 6–3	(Italy) Chiara Pappacena (Italy) Martina Parmigiani	
1/10/2024	(Spain) Martina Calvo (Spain) Sara Pujals	1–6 / 6–4 / 6–4	(Spain) Julia Polo Bautista (Spain) Lara Arruabarrena	
1/10/2024	(Italy) Giorgia Marchetti (France) Lea Godallier	6–2 / 6–2	(Spain) Alba Gallardo Salvado (Spain) Anna Ortiz Gasco	
30/9/2024	(France) Alix Collombon (Spain) Araceli Martinez	6–1 / 6–4	(France) Charlotte Soubrie (France) Lucile Pothier	
30/9/2024	(Spain) Jimena Velasco (Spain) Noa Canovas	6–4 / 6–2	(Spain) Martina Fassio (Spain) Raquel Eugenio Barrera	

=== Round of 32 ===
Men's

Date	Winners	Score	Opponent	Refs.
2/10/2024	(Argentina) Agustín Tapia (Spain) Arturo Coello	6–1 / 6–0	(Spain) Jaime Fermosell (Italy) Simone Cremona	
2/10/2024	(United Arab Emirates) Iñigo Jofre (Argentina) Juan Tello	6–4 / 7–6	(Portugal) Antonio Luque (Spain) Toni Bueno	
2/10/2024	(Spain) Álvaro Melendez Amaya (Argentina) Cristian German Gutiérrez	7–6 / 2–6 / 7–6	(Argentina) Alex Chozas (Argentina) Leandro Augsburger	
2/10/2024	(Spain) Coki Nieto (Spain) Jon Sanz	6–3 / 6–2	(Spain) Jose García Diestro (Spain) Javier García Mora	
2/10/2024	(Spain) Pablo Cardona (Spain) Paquito Navarro	7–6 / 7–6	(Spain) Ignacio Sager (Spain) Salvador Oria	
2/10/2024	(Argentina) Lucho Capra (Argentina) Maxi Sánchez	6–2 / 6–3	(France) Bastien Blanque (France) Johan Bergeron	
2/10/2024	(Spain) Ignacio Vilariño (Spain) Mario Del Castillo	7–6 / 7–6	(Italy) Denis Perino (Spain) Victor Mena Gil	
2/10/2024	(Argentina) Franco Stupaczuk (Spain) Miguel Yanguas	6–2 / 6–3	(Spain) Ivan Ramirez (Spain) Jose Solano Marmolejo	
2/10/2024	(Spain) Juan Lebrón (Argentina) Martin Di Nenno	6–2 / 6–2	(Spain) Fran Ramirez (Spain) Rafael Méndez	
2/10/2024	(Argentina) Juan Cruz Belluati (Argentina) Ramiro Moyano	7–5 / 6–3	(Spain) Javier Rico (Spain) Luis Hernandez Quesada	
1/10/2024	(Spain) Francisco Gil Morales (Spain) Juanlu Esbri	7–6 / 6–2	(Argentina) Ignacio Piotto (France) Thomas Leygue	
1/10/2024	(Spain) Eduardo Alonso (Spain) Momo Gonzalez	6–3 / 3–6 / 6–1	(United Arab Emirates) Arnau Ayats (Spain) Enrique Goenaga	
1/10/2024	(Spain) Javi Garrido (Brazil) Lucas Bergamini	6–3 / 6–2	(Argentina) Agustín Gutiérrez (Spain) José Rico	
2/10/2024	(Argentina) Federico Mouriño (Spain) Marc Quilez	7–5 / 4–0 / W.O.	(Spain) Alonso Rodriguez (Spain) Jose Luis Gonzalez	
2/10/2024	(Italy) Aris Patiniotis (Spain) Jesus Moya	6–7 / 6–3 / 6–2	(Italy) Facundo Dominguez (Spain) Mario Huete	
1/10/2024	(Spain) Alejandro Galán (Argentina) Federico Chingotto	6–2 / 6–0	(Spain) Alvero Cepero (Spain) Miguel Benítez	

Women's

Date	Winners	Score	Opponent	Refs.
2/10/2024	(Spain) Ariana Sánchez (Spain) Paula Josemaria	6–2 / 6–2	(Portugal) Ana Catarina Nogueira (Spain) Marta Borrero	
2/10/2024	(Spain) Marina Guinart (Spain) Victoria Iglesias	6–3 / 6–4	(Spain) Agueda Perez (Spain) Patricia Martínez	
2/10/2024	(Spain) Beatriz Caldera (Spain) Lorena Rufo	6–3 / 6–4	(Spain) Noemi Aguilar (Spain) Teresa Navarro	
2/10/2024	(Spain) Lucia Sainz (Spain) Patricia Llaguno	6–0 / 6–3	(Spain) Esther Carnicero (Spain) Melania Merino Saez	
2/10/2024	(Argentina) Aranzazu Osoro (Spain) Veronica Virseda	6–1 / 6–3	(Brazil) Manuela Schuck (Spain) Mónica Gomez Rivas	
2/10/2024	(Russia) Ksenia Sharifova (Spain) Lucía Martínez Gomez	6–3 / 6–3	(Spain) Laia Rodriguez Abajo (Spain) Sandra Bellver	
2/10/2024	(Spain) Carmen Goenaga (Argentina) Virginia Riera	6–0 / 6–3	(Argentina) Julieta Bidahorria (Spain) Marta Talavan	
2/10/2024	(Spain) Marta Ortega (Portugal) Sofia Araújo	6–1 / 6–2	(Spain) Marina Martinez Lobo (Spain) Sofía Saiz Vallejo	
1/10/2024	(Spain) Andrea Ustero (Argentina) Delfina Brea	6–0 / 6–0	(Spain) Carmen Castillon (Portugal) Patricia Ribeiro	
1/10/2024	(Spain) Alejandra Alonso (Spain) Jana Montes Cabruja	4–6 / 6–4 / 6–3	(Spain) Marta Barrera (Spain) Marta Caparrós	
1/10/2024	(Spain) Barbara Las Heras (Spain) Marta Marrero	6–2 / 6–2	(Spain) Laura Lujan Rodriguez (Spain) Marta Arellano Navarro	
1/10/2024	(Argentina) Claudia Jensen (Spain) Tamara Icardo	6–2 / 6–1	(Netherlands) Marcella Koek (Netherlands) Rebeca Lopez	
2/10/2024	(Spain) Alejandra Salazar (Spain) Jessica Castelló	7–6 / 6–2	(Spain) Martina Calvo (Spain) Sara Pujals	
2/10/2024	(Spain) Carla Mesa (Spain) Sara Ruiz	4–6 / 6–0 / 6–3	(Italy) Giorgia Marchetti (France) Lea Godallier	
2/10/2024	(France) Alix Collombon (Spain) Araceli Martinez	6–4 / 6–3	(Italy) Carolina Orsi (Spain) Nuria Rodriguez	
2/10/2024	(Spain) Claudia Fernandéz (Spain) Gemma Triay	6–1 / 6–1	(Spain) Jimena Velasco (Spain) Noa Canovas	

=== Round of 16 ===
Men's

Date	Winners	Score	Opponent	Refs.
3/10/2024	(Argentina) Agustín Tapia (Spain) Arturo Coello	6–2 / 6–1	(United Arab Emirates) Iñigo Jofre (Argentina) Juan Tello	
3/10/2024	(Spain) Coki Nieto (Spain) Jon Sanz	6–2 / 6–2	(Spain) Álvaro Melendez Amaya (Argentina) Cristian German Gutiérrez	
3/10/2024	(Spain) Pablo Cardona (Spain) Paquito Navarro	7–6 / 2–6 / 6–4	(Argentina) Lucho Capra (Argentina) Maxi Sánchez	
3/10/2024	(Argentina) Franco Stupaczuk (Spain) Miguel Yanguas	6–4 / 4–1 / W.O.	(Spain) Ignacio Vilariño (Spain) Mario Del Castillo	
3/10/2024	(Spain) Juan Lebrón (Argentina) Martin Di Nenno	6–3 / 6–3	(Argentina) Juan Cruz Belluati (Argentina) Ramiro Moyano	
3/10/2024	(Spain) Eduardo Alonso (Spain) Momo Gonzalez	6–4 / 6–7 / 6–2	(Spain) Francisco Gil Morales (Spain) Juanlu Esbri	
3/10/2024	(Spain) Javi Garrido (Brazil) Lucas Bergamini	6–2 / 6–2	(Argentina) Federico Mouriño (Spain) Marc Quilez	
3/10/2024	(Spain) Alejandro Galán (Argentina) Federico Chingotto	6–4 / 6–3	(Italy) Aris Patiniotis (Spain) Jesus Moya	

Women's

Date	Winners	Score	Opponent	Refs.
3/10/2024	(Spain) Ariana Sánchez (Spain) Paula Josemaria	4–6 / 6–1 / 6–0	(Spain) Marina Guinart (Spain) Victoria Iglesias	
3/10/2024	(Spain) Lucia Sainz (Spain) Patricia Llaguno	6–2 / 7–5	(Spain) Beatriz Caldera (Spain) Lorena Rufo	
3/10/2024	(Argentina) Aranzazu Osoro (Spain) Veronica Virseda	7–6 / 6–0	(Russia) Ksenia Sharifova (Spain) Lucía Martínez Gomez	
3/10/2024	(Spain) Marta Ortega (Portugal) Sofia Araújo	7–6 / 6–2	(Spain) Carmen Goenaga (Argentina) Virginia Riera	
3/10/2024	(Spain) Andrea Ustero (Argentina) Delfina Brea	6–1 / 6–2	(Spain) Alejandra Alonso (Spain) Jana Montes Cabruja	
3/10/2024	(Argentina) Claudia Jensen (Spain) Tamara Icardo	6–3 / 6–1	(Spain) Barbara Las Heras (Spain) Marta Marrero	
3/10/2024	(Spain) Alejandra Salazar (Spain) Jessica Castelló	6–1 / 6–4	(Spain) Carla Mesa (Spain) Sara Ruiz	
3/10/2024	(Spain) Claudia Fernandéz (Spain) Gemma Triay	6–2 / 6–0	(France) Alix Collombon (Spain) Araceli Martinez	

-

=== Quarter-Finals ===
Men's

Date	Winners	Score	Opponent	Refs.
4/10/2024	(Argentina) Agustín Tapia (Spain) Arturo Coello	6–1 / 6–3	(Spain) Coki Nieto (Spain) Jon Sanz	
4/10/2024	(Argentina) Franco Stupaczuk (Spain) Miguel Yanguas	7–6 / 6–4	(Spain) Pablo Cardona (Spain) Paquito Navarro	
4/10/2024	(Spain) Juan Lebrón (Argentina) Martin Di Nenno	5–7 / 6–4 / 6–1	(Spain) Eduardo Alonso (Spain) Momo Gonzalez	
4/10/2024	(Spain) Alejandro Galán (Argentina) Federico Chingotto	6–0 / 6–2	(Spain) Javi Garrido (Brazil) Lucas Bergamini	

Women's

Date	Winners	Score	Opponent	Refs.
4/10/2024	(Spain) Ariana Sánchez (Spain) Paula Josemaria	6–1 / 6–2	(Spain) Lucia Sainz (Spain) Patricia Llaguno	
4/10/2024	(Argentina) Aranzazu Osoro (Spain) Veronica Virseda	6–2 / 6–2	(Spain) Marta Ortega (Portugal) Sofia Araújo	
4/10/2024	(Spain) Andrea Ustero (Argentina) Delfina Brea	5–7 / 6–2 / 6–3	(Argentina) Claudia Jensen (Spain) Tamara Icardo	
4/10/2024	(Spain) Claudia Fernandéz (Spain) Gemma Triay	4–6 / 7–6 / 6–3	(Spain) Alejandra Salazar (Spain) Jessica Castelló	

=== Semi-Finals ===
Men's

Date	Winners	Score	Opponent	Refs.
5/10/2024	(Argentina) Agustín Tapia (Spain) Arturo Coello	6–3 / 6–4	(Argentina) Franco Stupaczuk (Spain) Miguel Yanguas	
5/10/2024	(Spain) Alejandro Galán (Argentina) Federico Chingotto	6–2 / 6–2	(Spain) Juan Lebrón (Argentina) Martin Di Nenno	

Women's

Date	Winners	Score	Opponent	Refs.
5/10/2024	(Spain) Ariana Sánchez (Spain) Paula Josemaria	6–2 / 3–6 / 6–3	(Argentina) Aranzazu Osoro (Spain) Veronica Virseda	
5/10/2024	(Spain) Andrea Ustero (Argentina) Delfina Brea	6–4 / 4–6 / 6–0	(Spain) Claudia Fernandéz (Spain) Gemma Triay	

=== Finals ===
Men's

Date	Winners	Score	Opponent	Refs.
6/10/2024	(Argentina) Agustín Tapia (Spain) Arturo Coello	6–2 / 6–1	(Spain) Alejandro Galán (Argentina) Federico Chingotto	

Women's

Date	Winners	Score	Opponent	Refs.
6/10/2024	(Spain) Ariana Sánchez (Spain) Paula Josemaria	6–4 / 6–0	(Spain) Andrea Ustero (Argentina) Delfina Brea	
