= 2024 Dubai P1 =

Padel championships

- Date: 3 – 10 November
- Edition: 1st
- Category: P1
- Prize money: €470.000
- Location: Dubai, United Arab Emirates
- Venue: Dubai Duty Free Tennis Stadium

Champions
- Men's doubles: (Argentina) Agustín Tapia (Spain) Arturo Coello
- Women's doubles: (Spain) Bea González (Argentina) Delfina Brea

Chronology

The 2024 Dubai P1 (officially 2024 Dubai Premier Padel P1) was the twentieth tournament of the third season organized by Premier Padel, promoted by the International Padel Federation, and with the financial backing of Nasser Al-Khelaïfi's Qatar Sports Investments, now serving as the premier padel circuit.

In the women's category, Andrea Ustero and Delfina Brea, who had played together temporarily during Bea González's injury recovery, faced off in the finals of the first tournament where González and Brea reunited. The latter duo defeated the 9th ranked pair Alejandra Alonso and Ustero, with the number 3 seeds claiming their fifth title of the season.

In the men's category, the top two pairs in the FIP rankings faced each other in a final for the thirteenth time out of fourteen possible occasions. Agustín Tapia and Arturo Coello defeated Alejandro Galán and Federico Chingotto for the sixth consecutive time, claiming their eleventh title of 2024.

== Relevant Data ==
=== Complaints about tournament conditions ===
During the tournament, there were numerous complaints and protests from players directed at the FIP and Premier Padel, with the Professional Padel Players Association (PPA) speaking out about the adverse weather conditions and high temperatures the players faced in Dubai. Juan Cruz Belluati and Ramiro Moyano were the first to express their dissatisfaction: "It is absurd to play in this heat."

=== Dominance in the SuperClásico ===
With a total of 13 finals between Coello/Tapia and Galán/Chingotto, 'Chingalán' were able to win 4 of the first 7 duels. However, since the double 6–1, on July 7th, in the Genoa P2 the world number 1's have won the last 6 tournaments that they competed (both teams didn't compete in Bordeaux, Finland and Giza) amassing a streak of 30 consecutive wins over four months without a defeat.

Arturo Coello and Agustín Tapia also reached the milestone of 177 wins out of 194 matches played, along with 34 finals and 26 titles, since forming their partnership.

=== Youngest Premier Padel finalist ever ===
By reaching the finals with Alejandra Alonso, Andrea Ustero became the youngest athlete of all time to reach a Premier Padel final, at just 17 years old.

== Seeds ==
Male

Rnk.	Team	FIP Ranking Points
1	(Argentina) Agustín Tapia (Spain) Arturo Coello	30915
2	(Spain) Alejandro Galán (Argentina) Federico Chingotto	23737
3	(Spain) Juan Lebrón (Argentina) Martin Di Nenno	15544
4	(Argentina) Franco Stupaczuk (Spain) Miguel Yanguas	13024
5	(Spain) Pablo Cardona (Spain) Paquito Navarro	8562
6	(Spain) Coki Nieto (Spain) Jon Sanz	7810
7	(Spain) Eduardo Alonso (Spain) Momo Gonzalez	7407
8	(Spain) Javi Garrido (Brazil) Lucas Bergamini	7379
9	(Spain) Alejandro Arroyo (Spain) Alejandro Ruiz	5417
10	(Argentina) Fernando Belasteguín (Argentina) Valentino Libaak	4319
11	(Spain) Jose Garcia Diestro (Argentina) Sanyo Gutiérrez	4236
12	(Argentina) Lucho Capra (Argentina) Maxi Sanchéz	4072
13	(United Arab Emirates) Inigo Jofre (Argentina) Juan Tello	3740
14	(Spain) Javier Leal (Brazil) Lucas Campagnolo	3440
15	(Argentina) Alex Chozas (Argentina) Leandro Augsburguer	3363
16	(Spain) Javier Ruiz (Spain) Victor Ruiz	3272

Female

Rnk.	Team	FIP Ranking Points
1	(Spain) Ariana Sánchez (Spain) Paula Josemaria	29384
2	(Spain) Claudia Fernandez (Spain) Gemma Triay	18833
3	(Spain) Beatriz Gonzalez (Argentina) Delfina Brea	14889
4	(Spain) Marta Ortega (Portugal) Sofia Araújo	11914
5	(Spain) Alejandra Salazar (Spain) Jessica Castello	10666
6	(Spain) Lucia Sainz (Spain) Patricia Llaguno	10070
7	(Argentina) Claudia Jensen (Spain) Tamara Icardo	8358
8	(Argentina) Aranzazu Osoro (Spain) Veronica Virseda	7899
9	(Spain) Alejandra Alonso (Spain) Andrea Ustero	6541
10	(Spain) Carmen Goenaga (Argentina) Virginia Riera	5560
11	(Spain) Beatriz Caldera (Spain) Lorena Rufo	3862
12	(Russia) Ksenia Sharifova (Spain) Marta Marrero	3578
13	(Italy) Carolina Orsi (Spain) Nuria Rodriguez	3548
14	(Spain) Marina Guinart (Spain) Victoria Iglesias	3467
15	(Spain) Carla Mesa (Spain) Lucia Martinez Gomez	3195
16	(France) Alix Collombon (Spain) Araceli Martinez	2782

== Head-to-head record between teams ranked in the top 4 during the season ==
=== Man's ===
Record	Coello–Tapia	Galán–Chingotto	Lebrón–Di Nenno	Stupaczuk–Yanguas	Former Pairs	Galán–Lebrón	Paquito–Sanyo	Lebrón–Paquito	Di Nenno–Stupaczuk
Coello–Tapia	—	9–5	3–0	1–0		1–1	2–0	4–0	1–0
Galán–Chingotto	5–9	—	1–0	2–0		—	—	1–0	7–0
Lebrón–Di Nenno	0–3	0–1	—	—		—	—	—	—
Stupaczuk–Yanguas	0–1	0–2	—	—		—	—	—	—
Former Pairs									
Galán–Lebrón	1–1	—	—	—		—	—	—	2–0
Paquito–Sanyo	0–2	—	—	—		—	—	—	—
Lebrón–Paquito	0–4	0–1	—	—		—	—	—	0–1
Di Nenno–Stupaczuk	0–1	0–7	—	—		0–2	—	1–0	—

=== Women's ===
Record	Ariana–Paula	Fernandez–Triay	Gonzalez–D. Brea	Araújo–Ortega	Former Pairs	Icardo–Salazar	Ortega–Triay	Ortega–Virseda
Ariana–Paula	—	5–5	3–1	2–1		1–0	—	1–0
Fernandez–Triay	5–5	—	2–3	1–0		0–1	—	1–0
B. Gonzalez–D. Brea	1–3	3–2	—	1–0		3–0	—	—
Araújo–Ortega	1–2	0–1	0–1	—		—	—	—
Former Pairs								
Icardo–Salazar	0–1	1–0	0–3	—		—	—	—
Ortega–Triay	—	—	—	—		—	—	—
Ortega–Virseda	0–1	0–1	—	—		—	—	—

Matchups involving Andrea Ustero and Delfina Brea, and subsequently Delfina Brea and Lucia Sainz, are not included, as these were merely temporary pairings that lasted for a total of three tournaments while Bea González was recovering from an injury.

== Draws ==
=== Men's Bracket ===
Round of 32
1	(Spain) Coello / (Argentina) Tapia	6	6
Q	(Spain) A. Sans / (Spain) M. Gonzalez	3	3
29	(Argentina) F. Mouriño / (Spain) M. Quilez	4	6	4
14	(Spain) J. Leal / (Brazil) L. Campagnolo	6	4	6
15	(Argentina) A. Chozas / (Argentina) L. Augsburger	2	7	3
26	(Argentina) A. Gutiérrez / (Spain) J. Rico	6	5	6
23	(Spain) J. Barahona / (Spain) T. Zapata	6	6
8	(Spain) J. Garrido / (Brazil) L. Bergamini	3	3
7	(Spain) E. Alonso / (Spain) Momo	4	7	6
22	(Spain) J. Barahona / (Spain) T. Zapata	6	6	2
Q	(Spain) F. Ramirez / (Spain) M.H. Hernandez	2	2
16	(Spain) J. Ruiz / (Spain) V. Ruiz	6	6
LL	(Spain) C. Marti / (Spain) P. Amaya	6	6
WC	(Egypt) M. Aboulkassem / (Egypt) Y. Hossam	1	1
32	(Spain) I. Vilariño / (Spain) M. Del Castillo	2	2
3	(Argentina) Di Nenno / (Spain) Lebrón	6	6
4	(Argentina) Stupaczuk / (Spain) Yanguas	6	6
30	(Italy) A. Patiniotis / (Spain) J. Moya	1	3
17	(Spain) F. Guerrero / (Spain) J. Bautista	6	4	6
10	(Argentina) Belasteguín / (Argentina) V. Libaak	4	6	4
11	(Spain) J.G. Diestro / (Argentina) Sanyo	7	7
34	(Spain) I. Ramirez / (Spain) J. Marmolejo	6	6
Q	(Italy) A. Caruso / (France) T. Leygue	6	3	2
6	(Spain) Coki / (Spain) J. Sanz	4	6	6
5	(Spain) Paquito / (Spain) P. Cardona	6	4	5
24	(Argentina) J.C. Belluati / (Argentina) R. Moyano	3	6	7
18	(Spain) F. Gil / (Spain) J. Esbri	6	6
9	(Spain) A. Arroyo / (Spain) A. Ruiz	7	7
12	(Argentina) L. Capra / (Argentina) Maxi	6	6
Q	(Spain) G. Losada / (Spain) J. Martinez	4	3
19	(Spain) J. Rico / (Spain) L.H. Quesada	1	4
2	(Spain) Galán / (Argentina) Chingotto	6	6

Round of 16
1	(Spain) Coello / (Argentina) Tapia	7	6
14	(Spain) J. Leal / (Brazil) L. Campagnolo	6	4
26	(Argentina) A. Gutiérrez / (Spain) J. Rico	7	4	6
23	(Spain) J. Barahona / (Spain) T. Zapata	5	6	4
7	(Spain) E. Alonso / (Spain) Momo	5	6	6
16	(Spain) J. Ruiz / (Spain) V. Ruiz	7	3	3
LL	(Spain) C. Marti / (Spain) P. Amaya	3	3
3	(Argentina) Di Nenno / (Spain) Lebrón	6	6
4	(Argentina) Stupaczuk / (Spain) Yanguas	7	6
17	(Spain) F. Guerrero / (Spain) J. Bautista	6	2
11	(Spain) J.G. Diestro / (Argentina) Sanyo	3	3
6	(Spain) Coki / (Spain) J. Sanz	6	6
24	(Argentina) J.C. Belluati / (Argentina) R. Moyano	4	2
9	(Spain) A. Arroyo / (Spain) A. Ruiz	6	6
12	(Argentina) L. Capra / (Argentina) Maxi	6	5
2	(Spain) Galán / (Argentina) Chingotto	7	7

Quarter-Final
1	(Spain) Coello / (Argentina) Tapia	6	6
26	(Argentina) A. Gutiérrez / (Spain) J. Rico	1	4
7	(Spain) E. Alonso / (Spain) Momo	6	6	4
3	(Argentina) Di Nenno / (Spain) Lebrón	7	1	6
4	(Argentina) Stupaczuk / (Spain) Yanguas	7	6
6	(Spain) Coki / (Spain) J. Sanz	6	3
9	(Spain) A. Arroyo / (Spain) A. Ruiz	6	2
2	(Spain) Galán / (Argentina) Chingotto	7	6

Semi-Finals
1	(Spain) Coello / (Argentina) Tapia	7	6
3	(Argentina) Di Nenno / (Spain) Lebrón	5	1
4	(Argentina) Stupaczuk / (Spain) Yanguas	5	3
2	(Spain) Galán / (Argentina) Chingotto	7	6

Finals
1	(Spain) Coello / (Argentina) Tapia	6	6
2	(Spain) Galán / (Argentina) Chingotto	4	3

=== Women's Bracket ===
Round of 32
1	(Spain) A. Sánchez / (Spain) P. Josemaria	6	6
18	(Spain) E. Carnicero / (Spain) M. Merino	1	4
19	(Portugal) A. Nogueira / (Spain) M.R. Abajo	3	0
10	(Spain) C. Goenaga / (Argentina) V. Riera	6	6
13	(Italy) C. Orsi / (Spain) N. Rodriguez	6	3	4
14	(Spain) M. Guinart / (Spain) V. Iglesias	4	6	6
24	(Italy) G. Marchetti / (France) L. Godallier
7	(Argentina) C. Jensen / (Spain) T. Icardo	*
8	(Argentina) A. Osoro / (Spain) V. Virseda	6	4	6
12	(Russia) K. Sharifova / (Spain) M. Marrero	3	6	2
Q	(Brazil) M. Schuck / (Spain) M. Rivas	6	2	2
25	(Spain) A. Rojo / (Spain) Sara Ruiz	3	6	6
15	(Spain) C. Mesa / (Spain) L. Martinez	5	4
22	(Spain) M. Lobo / (Spain) S. Saiz	7	6
17	(Argentina) J. Bidahorria / (Spain) M. Talavan	1	1
3	(Spain) B. Gonzalez / (Argentina) D. Brea	6	6
4	(Spain) M. Ortega / (Portugal) S. Araújo	6	7
Q	(Spain) M. Barrera / (Spain) M. Caparros	0	5
11	(Spain) B. Caldera / (Spain) L. Rufo	6	7
Q	(Argentina) M. Goyeneche / (Spain) R. Barrera	3	5
WC	(Italy) C. Casali / (Italy) L. Vano	1	6
9	(Spain) A. Alonso / (Spain) A. Ustero	6	7
27	(Spain) A. Cañellas / (Spain) M. Borrero	2	1
5	(Spain) A. Salazar / (Spain) J. Castello	6	6
6	(Spain) L. Sainz / (Spain) P. Llaguno	6	6
21	(Spain) A. Perez / (Spain) P. Martinez	3	3
26	(Spain) N. Aguilar / (Spain) T. Navarro	2	1
16	(France) A. Collombon / (Spain) A. Martinez	6	6
20	(Spain) J. Velasco / (Spain) N. Canovas	6	6
Q	(Spain) J. Bautista / (Spain) L. Arruabarrena	3	4
Q	(Spain) B. Las Heras / (Spain) S. Bellver	2	3
2	(Spain) C. Fernandez / (Spain) G. Triay	6	6

Round of 16
1	(Spain) A. Sánchez / (Spain) P. Josemaria	6	6
10	(Spain) C. Goenaga / (Argentina) V. Riera	4	3
14	(Spain) M. Guinart / (Spain) V. Iglesias	4	4
7	(Argentina) C. Jensen / (Spain) T. Icardo	6	6
8	(Argentina) A. Osoro / (Spain) V. Virseda	6	6
25	(Spain) A. Rojo / (Spain) Sara Ruiz	1	3
22	(Spain) M. Lobo / (Spain) S. Saiz	0	2
3	(Spain) B. Gonzalez / (Argentina) D. Brea	6	6
4	(Spain) M. Ortega / (Portugal) S. Araújo	6	6
11	(Spain) B. Caldera / (Spain) L. Rufo	3	4
9	(Spain) A. Alonso / (Spain) A. Ustero	7	3	6
6	(Spain) A. Salazar / (Spain) J. Castello	6	6	2
6	(Spain) L. Sainz / (Spain) P. Llaguno	7	6
16	(France) A. Collombon / (Spain) A. Martinez	6	4
20	(Spain) J. Velasco / (Spain) N. Canovas	1	3
2	(Spain) C. Fernandez / (Spain) G. Triay	6	6

Quarter-Final
1	(Spain) A. Sánchez / (Spain) P. Josemaria	6	6
7	(Argentina) C. Jensen / (Spain) T. Icardo	0	3
8	(Argentina) A. Osoro / (Spain) V. Virseda	0	2
3	(Spain) B. Gonzalez / (Argentina) D. Brea	6	6
4	(Spain) M. Ortega / (Portugal) S. Araújo	6	4
9	(Spain) A. Alonso / (Spain) A. Ustero	6	7
6	(Spain) L. Sainz / (Spain) P. Llaguno	3	1
2	(Spain) C. Fernandez / (Spain) G. Triay	6	6

Semi-Finals
1	(Spain) A. Sánchez / (Spain) P. Josemaria	4	6	3
3	(Spain) B. Gonzalez / (Argentina) D. Brea	6	4	6
9	(Spain) A. Alonso / (Spain) A. Ustero	6	6
2	(Spain) C. Fernandez / (Spain) G. Triay	4	4

Finals
3	(Spain) B. Gonzalez / (Argentina) D. Brea	6	6
9	(Spain) A. Alonso / (Spain) A. Ustero	2	3

== Results ==
=== First Round ===
Men's

Date	Winners	Score	Opponent	Refs.
5/11/2024	(Spain) Anton Sans (Spain) Miguel Gonzalez García	6–4 / 4–6 / 6–2	(France) Bastien Blanque (France) Johan Bergeron	
5/11/2024	(Argentina) Federico Mouriño (Spain) Marc Quilez	7–6 / 7–6	(Spain) Emilio Sanchez Chamero (Italy) Facundo Dominguez	
5/11/2024	(Argentina) Agustin Gutiérrez (Spain) José Rico	6–4 / 6–4	(Spain) Daniel Santigosa (Argentina) Miguel Lamperti	
5/11/2024	(Spain) Javier García Mora (Spain) Javier Gonzalez Barahona	6–4 / 6–1	(Spain) Ignacio Sager Nagel (Spain) Salvador Oria	
5/11/2024	(Spain) Enrique Goenaga (Spain) Teodoro Zapata	6–4 / 6–2	(Spain) Álvaro Melendez Amaya (Argentina) Cristian German Gutiérrez	
5/11/2024	(Spain) Fran Ramirez (Spain) Mario Huete	6–3 / 6–0	(United Arab Emirates) Fares Al Janahi (Argentina) Julian Lacamoire	
5/11/2024	(Egypt) Mohammed Aboulkassem (Egypt) Youssef Hossam	6–4 / 7–6	(Spain) Fran Jurado (Spain) Sergio Icardo	
5/11/2024	(Spain) Ignacio Vilariño (Spain) Mario Del Castillo	6–4 / 4–6 / 6–4	(Spain) Alvero Cepero (Spain) Miguel Benítez	
5/11/2024	(Italy) Aris Patiniotis (Spain) Jesus Moya	7–6 / 6–4	(Spain) David Gala Sanchez (Spain) Jaime Muñoz	
5/11/2024	(Spain) Francisco Guerrero (Spain) Jairo Bautista	6–3 / 6–2	(Spain) José Jimenez Casas (Spain) Pincho Fernandez	
5/11/2024	(Spain) Ivan Ramirez (Spain) Jose Solano Marmolejo	6–3 / 3–6 / 7–5	(Spain) Diego Gil Batista (Spain) Rafael Mendez	
5/11/2024	(Spain) Alvaro Montiel (France) Thomas Leygue	1–6 / 7–6 / 6–4	(Italy) Denis Perino (Spain) Jorge Ruiz Gutiérrez	
5/11/2024	(Argentina) Juan Cruz Belluati (Argentina) Ramiro Moyano	6–3 / 6–4	(Spain) Andres Fernandez Lancha (Spain) Mario Ortega	
5/11/2024	(Spain) Francisco Gil Morales (Spain) Juanlu Esbri	7–6 / 6–3	(United Arab Emirates) Arnau Ayats (Spain) Pablo García Rodrigo	
5/11/2024	(Spain) Guillermo Collado (Spain) Javi Martinez Vazquez	4–6 / 6–3 / 6–4	(Spain) Gonzalo Rubio (Spain) Pablo Lijó	
5/11/2024	(Spain) Luis Hernandez Quesada (Spain) Javi Rico	6–2 / 7–6	(Argentina) Agustin Torre (Chile) Javier Valdes	

=== Round of 32 ===
Men's

Date	Winners	Score	Opponent	Refs.
6/11/2024	(Argentina) Agustín Tapia (Spain) Arturo Coello	6–3 / 6–3	(Spain) Anton Sans (Spain) Miguel Gonzalez García	
6/11/2024	(Spain) Javi Leal (Brazil) Lucas Campagnolo	6–4 / 4–6 / 6–4	(Argentina) Federico Mouriño (Spain) Marc Quilez	
6/11/2024	(Argentina) Agustin Gutiérrez (Spain) José Rico	6–2 / 5–7 / 6–3	(Argentina) Alex Chozas (Argentina) Leandro Augsburger	
6/11/2024	(Spain) Javier García Mora (Spain) Javier Gonzalez Barahona	6–3 / 6–3	(Spain) Javi Garrido (Brazil) Lucas Bergamini	
6/11/2024	(Spain) Eduardo Alonso (Spain) Momo Gonzalez	4–6 / 7–6 / 6–2	(Spain) Enrique Goenaga (Spain) Teodoro Zapata	
6/11/2024	(Spain) Javi Ruiz (Spain) Victor Ruiz	6–2 / 6–2	(Spain) Fran Ramirez (Spain) Mario Huete	
6/11/2024	(Spain) Carlos Marti (Spain) Pedro Melendez Amaya	6–1 / 6–1	(Egypt) Mohammed Aboulkassem (Egypt) Youssef Hossam	
6/11/2024	(Spain) Juan Lebrón (Argentina) Martin Di Nenno	6–2 / 6–2	(Spain) Ignacio Vilariño (Spain) Mario Del Castillo	
6/11/2024	(Argentina) Franco Stupaczuk (Spain) Mike Yanguas	6–1 / 6–3	(Italy) Aris Patiniotis (Spain) Jesus Moya	
6/11/2024	(Spain) Francisco Guerrero (Spain) Jairo Bautista	6–4 / 4–6 / 6–4	(Argentina) Fernando Belasteguín (Argentina) Valentino Libaak	
6/11/2024	(Spain) Jose García Diestro (Argentina) Sanyo Gutiérrez	7–6 / 7–6	(Spain) Ivan Ramirez (Spain) Jose Solano Marmolejo	
6/11/2024	(Spain) Coki Nieto (Spain) Jon Sanz	4–6 / 6–3 / 6–2	(Spain) Alvaro Montiel (France) Thomas Leygue	
6/11/2024	(Argentina) Juan Cruz Belluati (Argentina) Ramiro Moyano	3–6 / 6–4 / 7–5	(Spain) Pablo Cardona (Spain) Paquito Navarro	
6/11/2024	(Spain) Alex Arroyo (Spain) Alex Ruiz	7–6 / 7–6	(Spain) Francisco Gil Morales (Spain) Juanlu Esbri	
6/11/2024	(Argentina) Lucho Capra (Argentina) Maxi Sánchez	6–4 / 6–3	(Spain) Guillermo Collado (Spain) Javi Martinez Vazquez	
6/11/2024	(Spain) Alejandro Galán (Argentina) Federico Chingotto	6–1 / 6–4	(Spain) Luis Hernandez Quesada (Spain) Javi Rico	

Women's

Date	Winners	Score	Opponent	Refs.
6/11/2024	(Spain) Ariana Sánchez (Spain) Paula Josemaria	6–1 / 6–4	(Spain) Esther Carnicero (Spain) Melania Merino Saez	
6/11/2024	(Spain) Carmen Goenaga (Argentina) Virginia Riera	6–3 / 6–0	(Portugal) Ana Catarina Nogueira (Spain) Laia Rodriguez Abajo	
5/11/2024	(Spain) Marina Guinart (Spain) Victoria Iglesias	4–6 / 6–3 / 6–4	(Italy) Carolina Orsi (Spain) Nuria Rodriguez	
5/11/2024	(Argentina) Claudia Jensen (Spain) Tamara Icardo	W.O.	(Italy) Giorgia Marchetti (France) Lea Godallier	
6/11/2024	(Argentina) Aranzazu Osoro (Spain) Veronica Virseda	6–3 / 4–6 / 6–2	(Russia) Ksenia Sharifova (Spain) Marta Marrero	
6/11/2024	(Brazil) Manuela Schuck (Spain) Mónica Gomez Rivas	3–6 / 6–2 / 62	(Spain) Alicia Blanco Rojo (Spain) Sara Ruiz Soto	
5/11/2024	(Spain) Marina Martinez Lobo (Spain) Sofía Saiz Vallejo	7–5 / 6–4	(Spain) Carla Mesa (Spain) Lucía Martínez Gomez	
6/11/2024	(Spain) Bea González (Argentina) Delfina Brea	6–1 / 6–1	(Argentina) Julieta Bidahorria (Spain) Marta Talavan	
6/11/2024	(Spain) Marta Ortega (Portugal) Sofia Araújo	6–0 / 7–5	(Spain) Marta Barrera (Spain) Marta Caparrós	
6/11/2024	(Spain) Beatriz Caldera (Spain) Lorena Rufo	6–3 / 7–5	(Argentina) Martina Fassio Goyeneche (Spain) Raquel Eugenio Barrera	
5/11/2024	(Spain) Alejandra Alonso (Spain) Andrea Ustero	6–1 / 7–6	(Italy) Carlotta Casali (Italy) Lorena Vano	
5/11/2024	(Spain) Alejandra Salazar (Spain) Jessica Castelló	6–2 / 6–1	(Spain) Ariadna Cañellas (Spain) Marta Borrero	
6/11/2024	(Spain) Lucia Sainz (Spain) Patricia Llaguno	6–3 / 6–3	(Spain) Agueda Perez (Spain) Patricia Martínez	
6/11/2024	(France) Alix Collombon (Spain) Araceli Martinez	6–2 / 6–1	(Spain) Noemi Aguilar (Spain) Teresa Navarro	
6/11/2024	(Spain) Jimena Velasco (Spain) Noa Canovas	6–3 / 6–4	(Spain) Julia Polo Bautista (Spain) Lara Arruabarrena	
6/11/2024	(Spain) Claudia Fernandéz; Gemma Triay	6–2 / 6–3	(Spain) Barbara Las Heras (Spain) Sandra Bellver	

=== Round of 16 ===
Men's

Date	Winners	Score	Opponent	Refs.
7/11/2024	(Argentina) Agustín Tapia (Spain) Arturo Coello	7–6 / 6–4	(Spain) Javi Leal (Brazil) Lucas Campagnolo	
7/11/2024	(Argentina) Agustin Gutiérrez (Spain) José Rico	7–5 / 4–6 / 6–4	(Spain) Javier García Mora (Spain) Javier Gonzalez Barahona	
7/11/2024	(Spain) Eduardo Alonso (Spain) Momo Gonzalez	5–7 / 6–3 / 6–3	(Spain) Javi Ruiz (Spain) Victor Ruiz	
7/11/2024	(Spain) Juan Lebrón (Argentina) Martin Di Nenno	6–3 / 4–3 / W.O.	(Spain) Carlos Marti (Spain) Pedro Melendez Amaya	
7/11/2024	(Argentina) Franco Stupaczuk (Spain) Mike Yanguas	7–6 / 6–2	(Spain) Francisco Guerrero (Spain) Jairo Bautista	
7/11/2024	(Spain) Coki Nieto (Spain) Jon Sanz	6–3 / 6–3	(Spain) Jose García Diestro (Argentina) Sanyo Gutiérrez	
7/11/2024	(Spain) Alex Arroyo (Spain) Alex Ruiz	6–4 / 6–2	(Argentina) Juan Cruz Belluati (Argentina) Ramiro Moyano	
7/11/2024	(Spain) Alejandro Galán (Argentina) Federico Chingotto	7–6 / 7–5	(Argentina) Lucho Capra (Argentina) Maxi Sánchez	

Women's

Date	Winners	Score	Opponent	Refs.
7/11/2024	(Spain) Ariana Sánchez (Spain) Paula Josemaria	6–4 / 6–3	(Spain) Carmen Goenaga (Argentina) Virginia Riera	
7/11/2024	(Argentina) Claudia Jensen (Spain) Tamara Icardo	6–4 / 6–4	(Spain) Marina Guinart (Spain) Victoria Iglesia	
7/11/2024	(Argentina) Aranzazu Osoro (Spain) Veronica Virseda	6–1 / 6–3	(Brazil) Manuela Schuck (Spain) Mónica Gomez Rivas	
7/11/2024	(Spain) Bea González (Argentina) Delfina Brea	6–0 / 6–2	(Spain) Marina Martinez Lobo (Spain) Sofía Saiz Vallejo	
7/11/2024	(Spain) Marta Ortega (Portugal) Sofia Araújo	6–3 / 6–4	(Spain) Beatriz Caldera (Spain) Lorena Rufo	
7/11/2024	(Spain) Alejandra Alonso (Spain) Andrea Ustero	7–6 / 3–6 / 6–2	(Spain) Alejandra Salazar (Spain) Jessica Castelló	
7/11/2024	(Spain) Lucia Sainz (Spain) Patricia Llaguno	7–6 / 6–4	(France) Alix Collombon (Spain) Araceli Martinez	
7/11/2024	(Spain) Claudia Fernandéz; Gemma Triay	6–1 / 6–3	(Spain) Jimena Velasco (Spain) Noa Canovas	

=== Quarter-Finals ===
Men's

Date	Winners	Score	Opponent	Refs.
8/11/2024	(Argentina) Agustín Tapia (Spain) Arturo Coello	6–1 / 6–4	(Argentina) Agustin Gutiérrez (Spain) José Rico	
8/11/2024	(Spain) Juan Lebrón (Argentina) Martin Di Nenno	7–6 / 1–6 / 6–4	(Spain) Eduardo Alonso (Spain) Momo Gonzalez	
8/11/2024	(Argentina) Franco Stupaczuk (Spain) Mike Yanguas	7–6 / 6–3	(Spain) Coki Nieto (Spain) Jon Sanz	
8/11/2024	(Spain) Alejandro Galán (Argentina) Federico Chingotto	7–6 / 6–2	(Spain) Alex Arroyo (Spain) Alex Ruiz	

Women's

Date	Winners	Score	Opponent	Refs.
8/11/2024	(Spain) Ariana Sánchez (Spain) Paula Josemaria	6–0 / 6–3	(Argentina) Claudia Jensen (Spain) Tamara Icardo	
8/11/2024	(Spain) Bea González (Argentina) Delfina Brea	6–0 / 6–2	(Argentina) Aranzazu Osoro (Spain) Veronica Virseda	
8/11/2024	(Spain) Alejandra Alonso (Spain) Andrea Ustero	7–6 / 6–4	(Spain) Marta Ortega (Portugal) Sofia Araújo	
8/11/2024	(Spain) Claudia Fernandéz; Gemma Triay	6–3 / 6–1	(Spain) Lucia Sainz (Spain) Patricia Llaguno	

=== Semi-Finals ===
Men's

Date	Winners	Score	Opponent	Refs.
9/11/2024	(Argentina) Agustín Tapia (Spain) Arturo Coello	7–5 / 6–1	(Spain) Juan Lebrón (Argentina) Martin Di Nenno	
9/11/2024	(Spain) Alejandro Galán (Argentina) Federico Chingotto	7–5 / 6–3	(Argentina) Franco Stupaczuk (Spain) Mike Yanguas	

Women's

Date	Winners	Score	Opponent	Refs.
9/11/2024	(Spain) Bea González (Argentina) Delfina Brea	6–4 / 4–6 / 6–3	(Spain) Ariana Sánchez (Spain) Paula Josemaría	
9/11/2024	(Spain) Alejandra Alonso (Spain) Andrea Ustero	6–4 / 6–4	(Spain) Claudia Fernandéz; Gemma Triay	

=== Finals ===
Men's

Date	Winners	Score	Opponent	Refs.
10/11/2024	(Argentina) Agustín Tapia (Spain) Arturo Coello	6–4 / 6–3	(Spain) Alejandro Galán (Argentina) Federico Chingotto	

Women's

Date	Winners	Score	Opponent	Refs.
10/11/2024	(Spain) Bea González (Argentina) Delfina Brea	6–2 / 6–3	(Spain) Alejandra Alonso (Spain) Andrea Ustero	
