= 2024 Madrid P1 =

Padel championships

- Date: 31 August – 8 September
- Edition: 3rd
- Category: P1
- Prize money: €470.000
- Location: Madrid, Spain
- Venue: Wizink Center

Champions
- Men's doubles: (Argentina) Agustín Tapia (Spain) Arturo Coello
- Women's doubles: (Spain) Claudia Fernández (Spain) Gemma Triay

Chronology

The 2024 Madrid P1 (officially 2024 Comunidad de Madrid Premier Padel P1) was the fifteenth tournament, and the first after the summer break, of the third season organized by Premier Padel, promoted by the International Padel Federation, and with the financial backing of Nasser Al-Khelaïfi's Qatar Sports Investments, now serving as the premier padel circuit.

In the women's category, the second and third ranked pairs faced each other in a final for the third time, with Claudia Fernández and Gemma Triay defeating Bea Gonzalez and Delfina Brea to claim their third title of 2024.

In the men's category, the top two pairs in the FIP rankings faced each other in a final for the ninth time, with Agustín Tapia and Arturo Coello defeating Alejandro Galán and Federico Chingotto to claim their seventh title out of twelve finals played in 2024.

== Relevant Data ==
=== Attendance record ===
The tournament finals set a new attendance record for a Premier Padel tournament, drawing 14,028 spectators.

=== Reunion of former partners ===
The quarterfinal match between Juan Lebrón and Paquito Navarro marked their first encounter since the pair split up.

=== New number twos ===
Due to their tournament win, Claudia Fernández and Gemma Triay surpassed Bea and Delfina to the number two spot in the rankings.

== Seeds ==
Male

Rnk.	Team	FIP Ranking Points
1	(Argentina) Agustín Tapia (Spain) Arturo Coello	25915
2	(Spain) Alejandro Galán (Argentina) Federico Chingotto	22079
3	(Spain) Juan Lebrón (Argentina) Martin Di Nenno	16994
4	(Argentina) Franco Stupaczuk (Spain) Miguel Yanguas	11654
5	(Spain) Pablo Cardona (Spain) Paquito Navarro	8617
6	(Spain) Aléx Ruiz (Spain) Javi Garrido	7358
7	(Argentina) Fernando Belasteguín (Argentina) Juan Tello	7052
8	(Spain) Coki Nieto (Spain) Jon Sanz	6743
9	(Spain) Eduardo Alonso (Spain) Momo Gonzalez	6404
10	(Spain) Alejandro Arroyo (Argentina) Sanyo Gutiérrez	5871
11	(Argentina) Lucho Capra (Argentina) Maxi Sanchéz	4233
12	(Spain) Juanlu Esbri (Brazil) Lucas Bergamini	3588
13	(Spain) Javier Leal (Brazil) Lucas Campagnolo	3495
14	(Argentina) Valentino Libaak (Spain) Victor Ruiz	3027
15	(Spain) Javier Barahona (Spain) Teodoro Zapata	2500
16	(Spain) Gonzalo Rubio (Spain) Pablo Lijó	2483

Female

Rnk.	Team	FIP Ranking Points
1	(Spain) Ariana Sánchez (Spain) Paula Josemaria	26836
2	(Spain) Beatriz Gonzalez (Argentina) Delfina Brea	15681
3	(Spain) Claudia Fernandez (Spain) Gemma Triay	15672
4	(Spain) Marta Ortega (Portugal) Sofia Araújo	10874
5	(Spain) Alejandra Salazar (Spain) Jessica Castello	9541
6	(Spain) Lucia Sainz (Spain) Patty Llaguno	9379
7	(Argentina) Aranzazu Osoro (Spain) Veronica Virseda	6561
8	(Spain) Carmen Goenaga (Argentina) Virginia Riera	5659
9	(Argentina) Claudia Jensen (Argentina) Daiara Valenzuela	4760
10	(Spain) Alejandra Alonso (Spain) Andrea Ustero	4527
11	(Italy) Carolina Orsi (Spain) Nuria Rodriguez	3335
12	(Spain) Beatriz Caldera (Spain) Lorena Rufo	3224
13	(Russia) Ksenia Sharifova (Spain) Lucia Martinez	3108
14	(Spain) Marina Guinart (Spain) Victoria Iglesias	3028
15	(France) Alix Collombon (Spain) Araceli Martinez	2485
16	(Spain) Carla Mesa (Spain) Sara Ruiz	2464

== Head-to-head record between teams ranked in the top 4 during the season ==
=== Man's ===
Record	Coello–Tapia	Galán–Chingotto	Lebrón–Di Nenno	Stupaczuk–Yanguas	Former Pairs	Galán–Lebrón	Paquito–Sanyo	Lebrón–Paquito	Di Nenno–Stupaczuk
Coello–Tapia	—	5–5	1–0	—		1–1	2–0	4–0	1–0
Galán–Chingotto	5–5	—	—	—		—	—	1–0	7–0
Lebrón–Di Nenno	0–1	—	—	—		—	—	—	—
Stupaczuk–Yanguas	—	—	—	—		—	—	—	—
Former Pairs									
Galán–Lebrón	1–1	—	—	—		—	—	—	2–0
Paquito–Sanyo	0–2	—	—	—		—	—	—	—
Lebrón–Paquito	0–4	0–1	—	—		—	—	—	0–1
Di Nenno–Stupaczuk	0–1	0–7	—	—		0–2	—	1–0	—

=== Women's ===
Record	Ariana–Paula	Gonzalez–D. Brea	Fernandez–Triay	Araújo–Ortega	Former Pairs	Icardo–Salazar	Ortega–Triay	Ortega–Virseda
Ariana–Paula	—	2–1	4–4	1–1		1–0	—	1–0
B. Gonzalez–D. Brea	1–2	—	3–2	1–0		3–0	—	—
Fernandez–Triay	4–4	2–3	—	—		0–1	—	1–0
Araújo–Ortega	1–1	0–1	—	—		—	—	—
Former Pairs								
Icardo–Salazar	0–1	0–3	1–0	—		—	—	—
Ortega–Triay	—	—	—	—		—	—	—
Ortega–Virseda	0–1	—	0–1	—		—	—	—

== Draws ==
=== Men's Bracket ===
Round of 32
1	(Spain) Coello / (Argentina) Tapia	6	6
21	(Argentina) A. Chozas / (Argentina) L. Augsburger	1	3
32	(Spain) I. Ramirez / (Spain) J. Marmolejo	6	3	4
16	(Spain) G. Rubio / (Spain) P. Lijó	4	6	6
15	(Spain) J. Barahona / (Spain) T. Zapata	2	4
39	(Spain) A. Lancha / (Spain) J.G. Diestro	6	6
28	(Spain) A. Cepero / (Spain) M. Benitez	6	6
7	(Argentina) Belasteguin / (Argentina) J. Tello	4	1
5	(Spain) P. Cardona / (Spain) Paquito	6	6
Q	(Portugal) M. Deus / (Portugal) N. Deus	3	1
18	(Spain) F. Guerrero / (Spain) J. Bautista	7	7
13	(Spain) J. Leal / (Brazil) L. Campagnolo	5	6
9	(Spain) E. Alonso / (Spain) Momo	6	6
19	(Argentina) J.C. Belluati / (Argentina) R. Moyano	3	3
Q	(Spain) A. Berdonce / (Argentina) I. Piotto	1	3
3	(Argentina) Di Nenno / (Spain) Lebrón	6	6
4	(Argentina) Stupaczuk / (Spain) Yanguas	6	6
Q	(Argentina) F. Mouriño / (Spain) J. Ruiz	1	0
29	(Sweden) D. Windahl / (Chile) J. Valdes	4	2
14	(Argentina) V. Libaak / (Spain) V. Ruiz	6	6
12	(Spain) J. Esbri / (Brazil) L. Bergamini	6	6
38	(Spain) J.D. Sanchez / (Spain) M. Del Castillo	4	5
30	(Spain) I. Jofre / (Spain) L.H. Quesada	6	3	7
6	(Spain) A. Ruiz / (Spain) J. Garrido	3	6	6
8	(Spain) Coki / (Spain) J. Sanz	6	6
Q	(Spain) P. Alvarez / (Argentina) R. Valenzuela	1	1
WC	(Spain) M. Quilez / (Spain) M. Semmler	6	1
10	(Spain) A. Arroyo / (Argentina) Sanyo	7	6
11	(Argentina) L. Capra / (Argentina) Maxi	6	6
23	(Argentina) A. Gutiérrez / (Spain) J. Rico	4	1
Q	(Spain) A. Sans / (Spain) D. Sanchez	3	4
2	(Spain) Galán / (Argentina) F. Chingotto	6	6

Round of 16
1	(Spain) Coello / (Argentina) Tapia	6	6
16	(Spain) G. Rubio / (Spain) P. Lijó	2	4
39	(Spain) A. Lancha / (Spain) J.G. Diestro	4	7	6
28	(Spain) A. Cepero / (Spain) M. Benitez	6	6	1
5	(Spain) P. Cardona / (Spain) Paquito	6	6
18	(Spain) F. Guerrero / (Spain) J. Bautista	2	4
9	(Spain) E. Alonso / (Spain) Momo	4	2
3	(Argentina) Di Nenno / (Spain) Lebrón	6	6
4	(Argentina) Stupaczuk / (Spain) Yanguas	6	6
14	(Argentina) V. Libaak / (Spain) V. Ruiz	4	3
12	(Spain) J. Esbri / (Brazil) L. Bergamini	6	6
30	(Spain) I. Jofre / (Spain) L.H. Quesada	3	4
8	(Spain) Coki / (Spain) J. Sanz	6	6
10	(Spain) A. Arroyo / (Argentina) Sanyo	3	2
11	(Argentina) L. Capra / (Argentina) Maxi	2	2
2	(Spain) Galán / (Argentina) F. Chingotto	6	6

Quarter-Final
1	(Spain) Coello / (Argentina) Tapia	6	6
39	(Spain) A. Lancha / (Spain) J.G. Diestro	4	4
5	(Spain) P. Cardona / (Spain) Paquito	6	5
3	(Argentina) Di Nenno / (Spain) Lebrón	7	7
4	(Argentina) Stupaczuk / (Spain) Yanguas	3	7	3
12	(Spain) J. Esbri / (Brazil) L. Bergamini	6	6	6
8	(Spain) Coki / (Spain) J. Sanz	2	3
2	(Spain) Galán / (Argentina) F. Chingotto	6	6

Semi-Finals
1	(Spain) Coello / (Argentina) Tapia	6	6
3	(Argentina) Di Nenno / (Spain) Lebrón	4	4
12	(Spain) Coki / (Spain) J. Sanz	2	3
2	(Spain) Galán / (Argentina) F. Chingotto	6	6

Finals
1	(Spain) Coello / (Argentina) Tapia	6	7
2	(Spain) Galán / (Argentina) F. Chingotto	3	6

=== Women's Bracket ===
Round of 32
1	(Spain) A. Sanchez / (Spain) P. Josemaria	6	6
12	(Spain) B. Caldera / (Spain) L. Rufo	0	3
19	(Spain) E. Carnicero / (Spain) M. Merino	6	1
Q	(Spain) N. Aguilar / (Spain) T. Navarro	7	6
Q	(Spain) A. Soriano / (Spain) L. Manquillo	2	6	4
17	(Spain) B. Las Heras / (Spain) M. Marrero	6	3	6
10	(Spain) A. Alonso / (Spain) A. Ustero	6	1	6
6	(Spain) L. Sainz / (Spain) P. Llaguno	3	6	4
7	(Argentina) A. Osoro / (Spain) V. Virseda	7	6
15	(France) A. Collombon / (Spain) A. Martinez	6	1
13	(Russia) K. Sharifova / (Spain) L. Martinez	6	6
Q	(Spain) J. Bautista / (Spain) L. Arruabarrena	1	4
14	(Spain) M. Guinart / (Spain) V. Iglesias	3	2
24	(Italy) G. Marchetti / (France) L. Godallier	6	6
WC	(Spain) L. De Lera / (Spain) M. Cauvet	0	0
3	(Spain) C. Fernandez / (Spain) G. Triay	6	6
4	(Spain) M. Ortega / (Portugal) S. Araújo	6	6
11	(Italy) C. Orsi / (Spain) N. Rodriguez	3	1
25	(Spain) A. Cañellas / (Sweden) C. Navarro	4	4
16	(Spain) C. Mesa / (Spain) S. Ruiz	6	6
21	(Spain) J. Velasco / (Spain) N. Canovas	7	2	7
22	(Spain) M. Lobo / (Spain) S. Saiz	5	6	5
26	(Spain) A. Perez / (Spain) P. Martinez	5	6	6
8	(Spain) C. Goenaga / (Argentina) V. Riera	7	4	7
5	(Spain) A. Salazar / (Spain) J. Castello	6	6
20	(Portugal) A. Nogueira / (Spain) M. Talavan	4	2
18	(Argentina) J. Bidahorria / (Spain) M. Talavan	5	7	4
23	(Spain) M.R. Abajo / (Spain) S. Bellver	7	5	6
9	(Argentina) C. Jensen / (Argentina) D. Valenzuela	6	6	6
Q	(Brazil) M. Schuck / (Spain) M. Rivas	7	1	1
27	(Spain) M. Barrera / (Spain) M. Caparros	1	2
2	(Spain) B. Gonzalez / (Argentina) D. Brea	6	6

Round of 16
1	(Spain) A. Sanchez / (Spain) P. Josemaria	6	6
Q	(Spain) N. Aguilar / (Spain) T. Navarro	0	2
17	(Spain) B. Las Heras / (Spain) M. Marrero	5	1
10	(Spain) A. Alonso / (Spain) A. Ustero	7	6
7	(Argentina) A. Osoro / (Spain) V. Virseda	6	6
13	(Russia) K. Sharifova / (Spain) L. Martinez	3	3
24	(Italy) G. Marchetti / (France) L. Godallier	5	0
3	(Spain) C. Fernandez / (Spain) G. Triay	7	6
4	(Spain) M. Ortega / (Portugal) S. Araújo	6	6
16	(Spain) C. Mesa / (Spain) S. Ruiz	3	2
21	(Spain) J. Velasco / (Spain) N. Canovas	4	0
8	(Spain) C. Goenaga / (Argentina) V. Riera	6	6
5	(Spain) A. Salazar / (Spain) J. Castello	6	6
23	(Spain) M.R. Abajo / (Spain) S. Bellver	3	1
9	(Argentina) C. Jensen / (Argentina) D. Valenzuela	2	4
2	(Spain) B. Gonzalez / (Argentina) D. Brea	6	6

Quarter-Final
1	(Spain) A. Sanchez / (Spain) P. Josemaria	*
10	(Spain) A. Alonso / (Spain) A. Ustero
7	(Argentina) A. Osoro / (Spain) V. Virseda	2	1
3	(Spain) C. Fernandez / (Spain) G. Triay	6	6
4	(Spain) M. Ortega / (Portugal) S. Araújo	6	7
8	(Spain) C. Goenaga / (Argentina) V. Riera	2	5
5	(Spain) A. Salazar / (Spain) J. Castello	4	3
2	(Spain) B. Gonzalez / (Argentina) D. Brea	6	6

Semi-Finals
1	(Spain) A. Sanchez / (Spain) P. Josemaria	6	4	1
3	(Spain) C. Fernandez / (Spain) G. Triay	3	6	6
4	(Spain) M. Ortega / (Portugal) S. Araújo	6	2
2	(Spain) B. Gonzalez / (Argentina) D. Brea	7	6

Finals
3	(Spain) C. Fernandez / (Spain) G. Triay	6	2	*
2	(Spain) B. Gonzalez / (Argentina) D. Brea	2	1

== Results ==
=== First Round ===
Men's

Date	Winners	Score	Opponent	Refs.
2/9/2024	(Argentina) Alex Chozas (Argentina) Leandro Augsburger	6–4 / 6–3	(Spain) Javier García Mora (Spain) Jaime Muñoz	
2/9/2024	(Spain) Ivan Ramirez (Spain) José Solano Marmolejo	6–3 / 7–5	(Spain) Jesus Moya (Spain) Pablo Castillo Valverde	
2/9/2024	(Spain) Andres Fernandez Lancha (Spain) Jose García Diestro	6–1 / 6–2	(Italy) Denis Perino (Argentina) Miguel Lamperti	
2/9/2024	(Spain) Alvero Cepero (Spain) Miguel Benítez	6–2 / 7–6	(Spain) José Jimenez Casas (Spain) Pincho Fernandez	
2/9/2024	(Portugal) Miguel Deus (Portugal) Nuno Deus	2–6 / 7–5 / 7–6	(Spain) Arnau Ayats (Spain) Enrique Goenaga	
2/9/2024	(Spain) Francisco Guerrero (Spain) Jairo Bautista	6–2 / 6–4	(Spain) Emilio Sanchez Chamero (Italy) Facundo Dominguez	
2/9/2024	(Argentina) Juan Cruz Belluati (Argentina) Ramiro Moyano	7–5 / 6–1	(Italy) Aris Patiniotis (Spain) Jose Sanchez Serrano	
2/9/2024	(Spain) Adrian Marques (Argentina) Ignacio Piotto	6–1 / 6–2	(Spain) Carlos Marti (Argentina) Cristian German Gutiérrez	
2/9/2024	(Argentina) Federico Mouriño (Spain) Jorge Ruiz Gutiérrez	6–1 / 6–7 / 6–1	(Spain) Antonio Luque (Spain) Toni Bueno	
2/9/2024	(Sweden) Daniel Windahl (Chile) Javier Valdes	6–1 / 6–4	(Spain) Mario Ortega (Spain) Miguel Gonzalez	
2/9/2024	(Spain) Ignacio Vilariño (Spain) Mario Del Castillo	7–6 / 4–6 / 6–3	(Spain) Daniel Santigosa (Spain) Mario Huete	
2/9/2024	(Spain) Inigo Jofre (Spain) Luis Hernandez Quesada	7–6 / 6–3	(Spain) Francisco Gil Morales (Spain) Pablo García Rodrigo	
2/9/2024	(Spain) Pol Hernandez (Argentina) Ramiro Valenzuela	6–2 / 6–3	(Spain) Fran Ramirez (Spain) Victor Mena Gil	
2/9/2024	(Spain) Marc Quilez (Spain) Miguel Semmler	6–4 / 6–1	(Spain) Javi Rico (Spain) Rafael Méndez	
2/9/2024	(Argentina) Agustin Gutiérrez (Spain) José Rico	4–6 / 6–1 / 6–4	(Spain) Ignacio Sager (Spain) Salvador Oria	
2/9/2024	(Spain) Antón Sans (Spain) David Gala Sanchez	6–3 / 7–5	(Spain) Diego Gil Batista (Spain) Raúl Marcos Duran	

=== Round of 32 ===
Men's

Date	Winners	Score	Opponent	Refs.
4/9/2024	(Argentina) Agustín Tapia (Spain) Arturo Coello	6–1 / 6–3	(Argentina) Alex Chozas (Argentina) Leandro Augsburger	
4/9/2024	(Spain) Gonzalo Rubio (Spain) Pablo Lijó	4–6 / 6–3 / 6–4	(Spain) Ivan Ramirez (Spain) José Solano Marmolejo	
4/9/2024	(Spain) Andres Fernandez Lancha (Spain) Jose García Diestro	6–2 / 6–4	(Spain) Javier Gonzalez Barahona (Spain) Teodoro Zapata	
4/9/2024	(Spain) Alvero Cepero (Spain) Miguel Benítez	6–4 / 6–1	(Argentina) Fernando Belasteguín (Argentina) Juan Ignacio Tello	
3/9/2024	(Spain) Pablo Cardona (Spain) Paquito Navarro	6–3 / 6–1	(Portugal) Miguel Deus (Portugal) Nuno Deus	
3/9/2024	(Spain) Francisco Guerrero (Spain) Jairo Bautista	7–5 / 7–6	(Spain) Javier Leal (Brazil) Lucas Campagnolo	
4/9/2024	(Spain) Eduardo Alonso (Spain) Momo Gonzalez	6–3 / 6–3	(Argentina) Juan Cruz Belluati (Argentina) Ramiro Moyano	
4/9/2024	(Spain) Juan Lebrón (Argentina) Martin Di Nenno	6–1 / 6–3	(Spain) Adrian Marques (Argentina) Ignacio Piotto	
3/9/2024	(Argentina) Franco Stupaczuk (Spain) Miguel Yanguas	6–1 / 6–0	(Argentina) Federico Mouriño (Spain) Jorge Ruiz Gutiérrez	
3/9/2024	(Argentina) Valentino Libaak (Spain) Victor Ruiz	6–4 / 6–2	(Sweden) Daniel Windahl (Chile) Javier Valdes	
3/9/2024	(Spain) Juanlu Esbri (Brazil) Lucas Bergamini	6–4 / 7–5	(Spain) Ignacio Vilariño (Spain) Mario Del Castillo	
3/9/2024	(Spain) Inigo Jofre (Spain) Luis Hernandez Quesada	6–3 / 3–6 / 7–6	(Spain) Alex Ruiz (Spain) Javi Garrido	
4/9/2024	(Spain) Coki Nieto (Spain) Jon Sanz	6–1 / 6–1	(Spain) Pol Hernandez (Argentina) Ramiro Valenzuela	
4/9/2024	(Spain) Alejandro Arroyo (Argentina) Sanyo Gutiérrez	7–6 / 6–1	(Spain) Marc Quilez (Spain) Miguel Semmler	
3/9/2024	(Argentina) Lucho Capra (Argentina) Maxi Sánchez	6–4 / 6–1	(Argentina) Agustin Gutiérrez (Spain) José Rico	
3/9/2024	(Spain) Alejandro Galán (Argentina) Federico Chingotto	6–3 / 6–4	(Spain) Antón Sans (Spain) David Gala Sanchez	

Women's

Date	Winners	Score	Opponent	Refs.
4/9/2024	(Spain) Ariana Sánchez (Spain) Paula Josemaria	6–0 / 6–3	(Spain) Beatriz Caldera (Spain) Lorena Rufo	
4/9/2024	(Spain) Noemi Aguilar (Spain) Teresa Navarro	7–6 / 6–1	(Spain) Esther Carnicero (Spain) Melania Merino Saez	
3/9/2024	(Spain) Barbara Las Heras (Spain) Marta Marrero	6–2 / 3–6 / 6–4	(Spain) Arantxa Soriano (Spain) Letizia Manquillo	
3/9/2024	(Spain) Alejandra Alonso (Spain) Andrea Ustero	6–3 / 1–6 / 6–4	(Spain) Lucia Sainz (Spain) Patricia Llaguno	
4/9/2024	(Argentina) Aranzazu Osoro (Spain) Veronica Virseda	7–6 / 6–1	(France) Alix Collombon (Spain) Araceli Martinez	
4/9/2024	(Russia) Ksenia Sharifova (Spain) Lucía Martínez Gomez	6–1 / 6–4	(Spain) Julia Polo Bautista (Spain) Lara Arruabarrena	
3/9/2024	(Italy) Giorgia Marchetti (France) Lea Godallier	6–3 / 6–2	(Spain) Marina Guinart (Spain) Victoria Iglesias	
3/9/2024	(Spain) Claudia Fernandez (Spain) Gemma Triay	6–0 / 6–0	(Argentina) Catalina Tenorio (Spain) Lorena Alonso	
4/9/2024	(Spain) Marta Ortega (Portugal) Sofia Araújo	6–3 / 6–1	(Italy) Carolina Orsi (Spain) Nuria Rodriguez	
4/9/2024	(Spain) Carla Mesa (Spain) Sara Ruiz Soto	6–4 / 6–4	(Spain) Ariadna Cañellas (Sweden) Carolina Navarro	
3/9/2024	(Spain) Jimena Velasco (Spain) Noa Canovas	7–5 / 2–6 / 7–6	(Spain) Marina Martinez Lobo (Spain) Sofía Saiz Vallejo	
3/9/2024	(Spain) Carmen Goenaga (Argentina) Virginia Riera	7–5 / 4–6 / 7–6	(Spain) Agueda Perez (Spain) Patricia Martínez	
4/9/2024	(Spain) Alejandra Salazar (Spain) Jessica Castelló	6–4 / 6–2	(Portugal) Ana Catarina Nogueira (Spain) Marta Borrero	
3/9/2024	(Spain) Laia Rodriguez Abajo (Spain) Sandra Bellver	7–5 / 5–7 / 6–4	(Argentina) Julieta Bidahorria (Spain) Marta Talavan	
3/9/2024	(Argentina) Claudia Jensen (Argentina) Daiara Valenzuela	6–7 / 6–1 / 6–1	(Brazil) Manuela Schuck (Spain) Mónica Gomez Rivas	
3/9/2024	(Spain) Bea González (Argentina) Delfina Brea	6–1 / 6–2	(Spain) Marta Barrera (Spain) Marta Caparrós	

=== Round of 16 ===
Men's

Date	Winners	Score	Opponent	Refs.
5/9/2024	(Argentina) Agustín Tapia (Spain) Arturo Coello	6–2 / 6–4	(Spain) Gonzalo Rubio (Spain) Pablo Lijó	
5/9/2024	(Spain) Andres Fernandez Lancha (Spain) Jose García Diestro	4–6 / 7–6 / 6–1	(Spain) Alvero Cepero (Spain) Miguel Benítez	
5/9/2024	(Spain) Pablo Cardona (Spain) Paquito Navarro	6–2 / 6–4	(Spain) Francisco Guerrero (Spain) Jairo Bautista	
5/9/2024	(Spain) Juan Lebrón (Argentina) Martin Di Nenno	6–4 / 6–2	(Spain) Eduardo Alonso (Spain) Momo Gonzalez	
5/9/2024	(Argentina) Franco Stupaczuk (Spain) Miguel Yanguas	6–4 / 6–3	(Argentina) Valentino Libaak (Spain) Victor Ruiz	
5/9/2024	(Spain) Juanlu Esbri (Brazil) Lucas Bergamini	6–3 / 6–4	(Spain) Inigo Jofre (Spain) Luis Hernandez Quesada	
5/9/2024	(Spain) Coki Nieto (Spain) Jon Sanz	6–3 / 6–2	(Spain) Alejandro Arroyo (Argentina) Sanyo Gutiérrez	
5/9/2024	(Spain) Alejandro Galán (Argentina) Federico Chingotto	6–2 / 6–2	(Argentina) Lucho Capra (Argentina) Maxi Sánchez	

Women's

Date	Winners	Score	Opponent	Refs.
5/9/2024	(Spain) Ariana Sánchez (Spain) Paula Josemaria	6–0 / 6–2	(Spain) Noemi Aguilar (Spain) Teresa Navarro	
5/9/2024	(Spain) Alejandra Alonso (Spain) Andrea Ustero	7–5 / 6–1	(Spain) Barbara Las Heras (Spain) Marta Marrero	
5/9/2024	(Argentina) Aranzazu Osoro (Spain) Veronica Virseda	6–3 / 6–3	(Russia) Ksenia Sharifova (Spain) Lucía Martínez Gomez	
5/9/2024	(Spain) Claudia Fernandez (Spain) Gemma Triay	7–5 / 6–0	(Italy) Giorgia Marchetti (France) Lea Godallier	
5/9/2024	(Spain) Marta Ortega (Portugal) Sofia Araújo	6–3 / 6–2	(Spain) Carla Mesa (Spain) Sara Ruiz Soto	
5/9/2024	(Spain) Carmen Goenaga (Argentina) Virginia Riera	6–4 / 6–0	(Spain) Jimena Velasco (Spain) Noa Canovas	
5/9/2024	(Spain) Alejandra Salazar (Spain) Jessica Castelló	6–3 / 6–1	(Spain) Laia Rodriguez Abajo (Spain) Sandra Bellver	
5/9/2024	(Spain) Bea González (Argentina) Delfina Brea	6–2 / 6–4	(Argentina) Claudia Jensen (Argentina) Daiara Valenzuela	

=== Quarter-Finals ===
Men's

Date	Winners	Score	Opponent	Refs.
6/9/2024	(Argentina) Agustín Tapia (Spain) Arturo Coello	6–4 / 6–4	(Spain) Andres Fernandez Lancha (Spain) Jose García Diestro	
6/9/2024	(Spain) Juan Lebrón (Argentina) Martin Di Nenno	7–6 / 7–5	(Spain) Pablo Cardona (Spain) Paquito Navarro	
6/9/2024	(Spain) Juanlu Esbri (Brazil) Lucas Bergamini	6–3 / 6–7 / 6–3	(Argentina) Franco Stupaczuk (Spain) Miguel Yanguas	
6/9/2024	(Spain) Alejandro Galán (Argentina) Federico Chingotto	6–2 / 6–3	(Spain) Coki Nieto (Spain) Jon Sanz	

Women's

Date	Winners	Score	Opponent	Refs.
6/9/2024	(Spain) Ariana Sánchez (Spain) Paula Josemaria	W.O.	(Spain) Alejandra Alonso (Spain) Andrea Ustero	
6/9/2024	(Spain) Claudia Fernandez (Spain) Gemma Triay	6–2 / 6–1	(Argentina) Aranzazu Osoro (Spain) Veronica Virseda	
6/9/2024	(Spain) Marta Ortega (Portugal) Sofia Araújo	6–2 / 7–5	(Spain) Carmen Goenaga (Argentina) Virginia Riera	
6/9/2024	(Spain) Bea González (Argentina) Delfina Brea	6–4 / 6–3	(Spain) Alejandra Salazar (Spain) Jessica Castelló	

=== Semi-Finals ===
Men's

Date	Winners	Score	Opponent	Refs.
7/9/2024	(Argentina) Agustín Tapia (Spain) Arturo Coello	6–4 / 6–4	(Spain) Juan Lebrón (Argentina) Martin Di Nenno	
7/9/2024	(Spain) Alejandro Galán (Argentina) Federico Chingotto	6–2 / 6–3	(Spain) Juanlu Esbri (Brazil) Lucas Bergamini	

Women's

Date	Winners	Score	Opponent	Refs.
7/9/2024	(Spain) Claudia Fernandez (Spain) Gemma Triay	3–6 / 6–4 / 6–1	(Spain) Ariana Sánchez (Spain) Paula Josemaria	
7/9/2024	(Spain) Bea González (Argentina) Delfina Brea	7–6 / 6–2	(Spain) Marta Ortega (Portugal) Sofia Araújo	

=== Finals ===
Men's

Date	Winners	Score	Opponent	Refs.
8/9/2024	(Argentina) Agustín Tapia (Spain) Arturo Coello	6–3 / 7–6	(Spain) Alejandro Galán (Argentina) Federico Chingotto	

Women's

Date	Winners	Score	Opponent	Refs.
8/9/2024	(Spain) Claudia Fernandez (Spain) Gemma Triay	6–2 / 2–1 / W.O.	(Spain) Bea González (Argentina) Delfina Brea	
