= 2024 Genoa P2 =

Padel championships

- Date: 30 June – 7 July
- Edition: 1st
- Category: P2
- Prize money: €250.000
- Location: Genoa, Italy
- Venue: Parco di valletta cambiaso

Champions
- Men's doubles: (Spain) Alejandro Galán (Argentina) Federico Chingotto
- Women's doubles: (Spain) Marta Ortega (Portugal) Sofia Araujo

Chronology

The 2024 Genoa P2 (officially 2024 Genova Premier Padel P2) was the twelfth tournament of the third season organized by Premier Padel, promoted by the International Padel Federation, and with the financial backing of Nasser Al-Khelaïfi's Qatar Sports Investments, now serving as the premier padel circuit.

In the women's category, FIP number 1 ranked pair, Ariana Sánchez and Paula Josemaría, reached their sixth final of the season, where they faced the number 4-ranked duo of Marta Ortega and Sofia Araujo. Competing in their first tournament together, the Spanish-Portuguese pair upset the top-ranked Arian and Paula to win the tournament, marking the second trophy of Araújo's career.

In the men's division, the top two ranked teams met in the finals for the seventh time in 2024, with Alejandro Galán and Federico Chingotto defeating Agustín Tapia and Arturo Coello, to claim their fifth title of the season as a pair.

== Relevant Data ==
=== Last match ===
The men's semifinals marked the last time Coello–Tapia and Di Nenno–Stupaczuk faced each other before the Argentines reunited as a pair for the 2025 Premier Padel Finals, while Galán and Lebrón faced off for the first time since their split.

=== First title for a Portuguese athlete ===
In the women's division, after five consecutive finals losses in major tournaments, Sofia Araújo won her first major professional padel title.

== Seeds ==
Male

Rnk.	Team	FIP Ranking Points
1	(Argentina) Agustín Tapia (Spain) Arturo Coello	27314
2	(Spain) Alejandro Galán (Argentina) Federico Chingotto	23621
3	(Argentina) Franco Stupaczuk (Argentina) Martin Di Nenno	17881
4	(Spain) Juan Lebrón (Spain) Paquito Navarro	17566
5	(Argentina) Fernando Belasteguín (Argentina) Juan Tello	8783
6	(Spain) Javi Garrido (Argentina) Miguel Yanguas	8745
7	(Argentina) Aléx Ruiz (Spain) Momo Gonzalez	7803
8	(Spain) Coki Nieto (Spain) Jon Sanz	6784
9	(Spain) Alejandro Arroyo (Argentina) Sanyo Gutiérrez	6406
10	(Argentina) Lucho Capra (Argentina) Maxi Sanchéz	4957
11	(Brazil) Lucas Bergamini (Spain) Victor Ruiz	4887
12	(Spain) Francisco Gil Morales (Argentina) Ramiro Moyano	3180
13	(Spain) Javi Ruiz (Spain) Pablo Cardona	3128
14	(Spain) Alex Chozas (Spain) Eduardo Alonso	3061
15	(Spain) Javi Rico (Spain) Juanlu Esbri	3052
16	(Spain) Javier Barahona (Spain) Teodoro Zapata	2445

Female

Rnk.	Team	FIP Ranking Points
1	(Spain) Ariana Sanchez (Spain) Paula Josemaria	28010
2	(Spain) Beatriz Gonzalez (Argentina) Delfina Brea	18245
3	(Spain) Claudia Fernandez (Spain) Gemma Triay	16231
4	(Spain) Marta Ortega (Portugal) Sofia Araújo	11393
5	(Argentina) Claudia Jensen (Spain) Jessica Castello	10247
6	(Spain) Lucia Sainz (Spain) Patty Llaguno	9357
7	(Spain) Alejandra Salazar (Spain) Veronica Virseda	9197
8	(Spain) Carmen Goenaga (Argentina) Virginia Riera	5648
9	(Argentina) Aranzazu Osoro (Spain) Marta Marrero	3467
10	(Spain) Beatriz Caldera (Spain) Lorena Rufo	3306
11	(Italy) Carolina Orsi (Spain) Nuria Rodriguez Camacho	3164
12	(Russia) Ksenia Sharifova (Spain) Lucia Martinez	3148
13	(Portugal) Ana Catarina Nogueira (Spain) Marta Talavan	2789
14	(Spain) Carla Mesa (Spain) Sara Ruiz	2649
15	(Spain) Esther Carnicero (Spain) Melania Merino	2271
16	(France) Alix Collombon (Argentina) Julieta Bidahorria	2245

== Head-to-head record between teams ranked in the top 4 during the season ==
=== Man's ===
Record	Coello–Tapia	Galán–Chingotto	Lebrón–Paquito	Di Nenno–Stupaczuk	Former Pairs	Galán–Lebrón	Paquito–Sanyo
Coello–Tapia	—	3–5	3–0	1–0		1–1	2–0
Galán–Chingotto	5–3	—	1–0	6–0		—	—
Lebrón–Paquito	0–3	0–1	—	0–1		—	—
Di Nenno–Stupaczuk	0–1	0–6	1–0	—		0–2	—
Former Pairs							
Galán–Lebrón	1–1	—	—	2–0		—	—
Paquito–Sanyo	0–2	—	—	—		—	—

=== Women's ===
Record	Ariana–Paula	Gonzalez–D. Brea	Fernandez–Triay	Araújo–Ortega	Former Pairs	Icardo–Salazar	Ortega–Triay	Ortega–Virseda
Ariana–Paula	—	2–1	3–3	0–1		1–0	—	1–0
B. Gonzalez–D. Brea	1–2	—	3–0	—		3–0	—	—
Fernandez–Triay	3–3	0–3	—	—		0–1	—	1–0
Araújo–Ortega	1–0	—	—	—		—	—	—
Former Pairs								
Icardo–Salazar	0–1	0–3	1–0	—		—	—	—
Ortega–Triay	—	—	—	—		—	—	—
Ortega–Virseda	0–1	—	0–1	—		—	—	—

== Draws ==
=== Men's Bracket ===
Round of 32
1	(Spain) Coello / (Argentina) Tapia	5	*
12	(Spain) F. Gil / (Argentina) R. Moyano	0
26	(Argentina) G. Alfonso / (Spain) J. Bautista	6	6
WC	(Italy) L. Di Giovanni / (Italy) R. Sinicropi	2	4
LL	(Spain) A. Sans / (Spain) D. Sanchez	6	4
13	(Spain) J. Ruiz / (Spain) P. Cardona	7	6
25	(Argentina) C.G. Gutierrez / (Italy) F. Dominguez	3	4
5	(Argentina) Belasteguin / (Argentina) J. Tello	6	6
6	(Spain) J. Garrido / (Spain) Yanguas	6	6
22	(Spain) J.G. Mora / (Spain) J. Muñoz	2	4
Q	(Italy) F. Abbate / (Italy) G. Graziotti	2	7	3
23	(Spain) J.J. Casas / (Spain) P. Fernandez	6	5	6
18	(Spain) I. Sager / (Spain) S. Oria	7	7
Q	(Spain) I. Jofre / (Spain) I. Ramirez	6	5
15	(Spain) J. Rico / (Spain) J. Esbri	1	4
3	(Argentina) F. Stupaczuk / (Argentina) Di Nenno	6	6
4	(Spain) Lebrón / (Spain) Paquito	6	6
WC	(Italy) M. Cassetta / (Italy) S. Cremona	0	1
LL	(Spain) F. Ramirez / (Spain) V. Mena	6	5
16	(Spain) J. Barahona / (Spain) T. Zapata	7	7
24	(Spain) G. Rubio / (Argentina) L. Aguirre	4	6
10	(Argentina) A. Chozas / (Argentina) L. Capra	6	7
19	(Argentina) J.C. Belluati / (Argentina) M. Lamperti	2	5
8	(Spain) A. Arroyo / (Argentina) Sanyo Gutiérrez	6	7
7	(Spain) Coki / (Spain) J. Sanz	6	6
14	(Argentina) A. Chozas / (Spain) E. Alonso	4	4
11	(Brazil) L. Bergamini / (Spain) V. Ruiz	1	*
Q	(Italy) D. Perino / (Spain) P.G. Rodrigo	1
Q	(Argentina) L. Augsburger / (Argentina) V. Libaak	6	6	6
21	(Spain) A. Ayats / (Spain) E. Goenaga	7	2	3
17	(Argentina) A. Gutiérrez / (Spain) J. Rico	1	0
2	(Spain) Galán / (Argentina) F. Chingotto	6	6

Round of 16
1	(Spain) Coello / (Argentina) Tapia	6	6
26	(Argentina) G. Alfonso / (Spain) J. Bautista	3	2
13	(Spain) J. Ruiz / (Spain) P. Cardona	1	6	6
5	(Argentina) Belasteguin / (Argentina) J. Tello	6	4	1
6	(Spain) J. Garrido / (Spain) Yanguas	6	6
23	(Spain) J.J. Casas / (Spain) P. Fernandez	4	4
18	(Spain) I. Sager / (Spain) S. Oria	5	5
3	(Argentina) F. Stupaczuk / (Argentina) Di Nenno	7	7
4	(Spain) Lebrón / (Spain) Paquito	6	6
16	(Spain) J. Barahona / (Spain) T. Zapata	3	1
10	(Argentina) A. Chozas / (Argentina) L. Capra	4	6	6
8	(Spain) A. Arroyo / (Argentina) Sanyo Gutiérrez	6	3	4
7	(Spain) Coki / (Spain) J. Sanz	4	3
11	(Brazil) L. Bergamini / (Spain) V. Ruiz	6	6
Q	(Argentina) L. Augsburger / (Argentina) V. Libaak	4	6
2	(Spain) Galán / (Argentina) F. Chingotto	6	7

Quarter-Final
1	(Spain) Coello / (Argentina) Tapia	7	6
13	(Spain) J. Ruiz / (Spain) P. Cardona	5	3
6	(Spain) J. Garrido / (Spain) Yanguas	4	3
3	(Argentina) F. Stupaczuk / (Argentina) Di Nenno	6	6
4	(Spain) Lebrón / (Spain) Paquito	6	6
10	(Argentina) A. Chozas / (Argentina) L. Capra	1	0
11	(Brazil) L. Bergamini / (Spain) V. Ruiz	3	4
2	(Spain) Galán / (Argentina) F. Chingotto	6	6

Semi-Finals
1	(Spain) Coello / (Argentina) Tapia	7	6
3	(Argentina) F. Stupaczuk / (Argentina) Di Nenno	6	2
4	(Spain) Lebrón / (Spain) Paquito	6	5	4
2	(Spain) Galán / (Argentina) F. Chingotto	4	7	6

Finals
1	(Spain) Coello / (Argentina) Tapia	1	1
2	(Spain) Galán / (Argentina) F. Chingotto	6	6

=== Women's Bracket ===
Round of 32
1	(Spain) A. Sanchez / (Spain) P. Josemaria
Bye
23	(Spain) A. Cañellas / (Spain) T. Navarro	3	2
18	(Spain) J. Velasco / (Spain) N. Canovas	6	6
13	(Portugal) A. Nogueira / (Spain) M. Talavan	7	7
21	(Spain) M. Barrera / (Spain) M. Caparros	5	5
15	(Spain) E. Carnicero / (Spain) M. Merino	2	2
6	(Spain) L. Sainz / (Spain) P. Llaguno	6	6
5	(Argentina) C. Jensen / (Spain) J. Castello	6	6
14	(Spain) C. Mesa / (Spain) S. Ruiz	2	4
11	(Italy) C. Orsi / (Spain) N. Rodriguez	6	6
Q	(Spain) A. Gallardo / (Italy) C. Casali	3	2
9	(Argentina) A. Osoro / (Spain) M. Marrero	6	6
Q	(Spain) M. Borrero / (Spain) S. Bellver	2	1
Bye
3	(Spain) C. Fernandez / (Spain) G. Triay
4	(Spain) M. Ortega / (Portugal) S. Araújo
Bye
Q	(Spain) J. Bautista / (Spain) L. Arruabarrena	7	4	1
16	(France) A. Collombon / (Argentina) J. Bidahorria	6	6	6
24	(Spain) M. Guinart / (Spain) S. Gonzalez	3	3
Q	(Spain) M. Goyeneche / (Spain) R. Barrera	6	6
22	(Spain) A. Perez / (Spain) P. Martinez	3	2
7	(Spain) A. Salazar / (Spain) V. Virseda	6	6
8	(Spain) C. Goenaga / (Argentina) V. Riera	6	1	6
10	(Spain) B. Caldera / (Spain) L. Rufo	4	6	1
17	(Spain) B. Las Heras / (Spain) V. Iglesias	6	2	6
20	(Spain) M. Lobo / (Spain) S. Saiz	2	6	4
19	(Sweden) C. Navarro / (Spain) M.R. Abajo	6	3
12	(Russia) K. Sharifova / (Spain) L. Martinez	7	6
Bye
2	(Spain) B. Gonzalez / (Argentina) D. Brea

Round of 16
1	(Spain) A. Sanchez / (Spain) P. Josemaria	6	6
18	(Spain) J. Velasco / (Spain) N. Canovas	3	0
13	(Portugal) A. Nogueira / (Spain) M. Talavan	3	4
6	(Spain) L. Sainz / (Spain) P. Llaguno	6	6
5	(Argentina) C. Jensen / (Spain) J. Castello	6	7
11	(Italy) C. Orsi / (Spain) N. Rodriguez	4	5
9	(Argentina) A. Osoro / (Spain) M. Marrero	0	2
3	(Spain) C. Fernandez / (Spain) G. Triay	6	6
4	(Spain) M. Ortega / (Portugal) S. Araújo	6	6
16	(France) A. Collombon / (Argentina) J. Bidahorria	3	2
Q	(Spain) M. Goyeneche / (Spain) R. Barrera	6	4
7	(Spain) A. Salazar / (Spain) V. Virseda	7	6
8	(Spain) C. Goenaga / (Argentina) V. Riera	6	7
17	(Spain) B. Las Heras / (Spain) V. Iglesias	3	5
12	(Russia) K. Sharifova / (Spain) L. Martinez	1	1
2	(Spain) B. Gonzalez / (Argentina) D. Brea	6	6

Quarter-Final
1	(Spain) A. Sanchez / (Spain) P. Josemaria	6	6
6	(Spain) L. Sainz / (Spain) P. Llaguno	1	0
5	(Argentina) C. Jensen / (Spain) J. Castello	3	3
3	(Spain) C. Fernandez / (Spain) G. Triay	6	6
4	(Spain) M. Ortega / (Portugal) S. Araújo	6	2	1
7	(Spain) A. Salazar / (Spain) V. Virseda	2	6	2
8	(Spain) C. Goenaga / (Argentina) V. Riera	7	6
2	(Spain) B. Gonzalez / (Argentina) D. Brea	5	2

Semi-Finals
1	(Spain) A. Sanchez / (Spain) P. Josemaria	6	4	6
3	(Spain) C. Fernandez / (Spain) G. Triay	3	6	2
4	(Spain) M. Ortega / (Portugal) S. Araújo	6	6
8	(Spain) C. Goenaga / (Argentina) V. Riera	1	4

Finals
1	(Spain) A. Sanchez / (Spain) P. Josemaria	3	6
4	(Spain) M. Ortega / (Portugal) S. Araújo	6	7

== Results ==
=== Round of 32 ===
Men's

Date	Winners	Score	Opponent	Refs.
3/7/2024	(Argentina) Agustín Tapia (Spain) Arturo Coello	5–0 / W.O.	(Spain) Francisco Gil Morales (Argentina) Ramiro Moyano	
3/7/2024	(Argentina) Gonzalo Alfonso (Spain) Jairo Bautista	6–2 / 6–4	(Italy) Lorenzo Di Giovanni (Italy) Riccardo Sinicropi	
3/7/2024	(Spain) Javier Ruiz (Spain) Pablo Cardona	7–6 / 6–4	(Spain) Antón Sans (Spain) David Gala Sanchez	
3/7/2024	(Argentina) Fernando Belasteguín (Argentina) Juan Tello	6–3 / 6–4	(Argentina) Cristian German Gutierrez (Italy) Facundo Dominguez	
3/7/2024	(Spain) Javi Garrido (Spain) Mike Yanguas	6–2 / 6–4	(Spain) Javier García Mora (Spain) Jaime Muñoz	
3/7/2024	(Spain) José Jimenez Casas (Spain) Pincho Fernandez	6–2 / 5–7 / 6–3	(Italy) Flavio Abbate (Italy) Giulio Graziotti	
3/7/2024	(Spain) Ignacio Sager (Spain) Salvador Oria	7–6 / 7–5	(Spain) Inigo Jofre (Spain) Ivan Ramirez	
3/7/2024	(Argentina) Franco Stupaczuk (Argentina) Martin Di Nenno	6–1 / 6–4	(Spain) Javier Rico (Spain) Juanlu Esbri	
3/7/2024	(Spain) Juan Lebrón (Spain) Paquito Navarro	6–0 / 6–1	(Italy) Marco Cassetta (Italy) Simone Cremona	
3/7/2024	(Spain) Javier Gonzalez Barahona (Spain) Teodoro Zapata	7–6 / 7–5	(Spain) Fran Ramirez (Spain) Victor Mena Gil	
3/7/2024	(Argentina) Lucho Capra (Argentina) Maxi Sánchez	6–4 / 7–6	(Spain) Gonzalo Rubio (Argentina) Leonel Aguirre	
3/7/2024	(Spain) Alejandro Arroyo (Argentina) Sanyo Gutiérrez	6–2 / 7–5	(Argentina) Juan Cruz Belluati (Argentina) Miguel Lamperti	
3/7/2024	(Spain) Coki Nieto (Spain) Jon Sanz	6–4 / 6–4	(Argentina) Alex Chozas (Spain) Eduardo Alonso	
3/7/2024	(Brazil) Lucas Bergamini (Spain) Víctor Ruiz	1–1 / W.O.	(Italy) Denis Perino (Spain) Pablo García Rodrigo	
3/7/2024	(Argentina) Leandro Augsburger (Argentina) Valentino Libaak	6–7 / 6–2 / 6–3	(Spain) Arnau Ayats (Spain) Enrique Goenaga	
3/7/2024	(Spain) Alejandro Galán (Argentina) Federico Chingotto	6–1 / 6–0	(Argentina) Agustin Gutiérrez (Spain) José Rico	

Women's

Date	Winners	Score	Opponent	Refs.
3/7/2024	(Spain) Jimena Velasco (Spain) Noa Canovas	6–3 / 6–2	(Spain) Ariadna Cañellas (Spain) Teresa Navarro	
3/7/2024	(Portugal) Ana Catarina Nogueira (Spain) Marta Talavan	7–5 / 7–5	(Spain) Marta Barrera (Spain) Marta Caparrós	
3/7/2024	(Spain) Lucia Sainz (Spain) Patricia Llaguno	6–2 / 6–2	(Spain) Esther Carnicero (Spain) Melania Merino Saez	
3/7/2024	(Argentina) Claudia Jensen (Spain) Jessica Castelló	6–2 / 6–4	(Spain) Carla Mesa (Spain) Sara Ruiz	
3/7/2024	(Italy) Carolina Orsi (Spain) Nuria Rodriguez	6–3 / 6–2	(Spain) Alba Gallardo Salvado (Italy) Carlotta Casali	
3/7/2024	(Argentina) Aranzazu Osoro (Spain) Marta Marrero	6–2 / 6–1	(Spain) Marta Borrero (Spain) Sandra Bellver	
3/7/2024	(France) Alix Collombon (Argentina) Julieta Bidahorria	6–7 / 6–4 / 6–1	(Spain) Julia Polo Bautista (Spain) Lara Arruabarrena	
3/7/2024	(Spain) Camila Fassio (Spain) Raquel Eugenio	6–3 / 6–3	(Spain) Marina Guinart (Spain) Sandra Oliveras	
3/7/2024	(Spain) Alejandra Salazar (Spain) Verónica Virseda	6–3 / 6–2	(Spain) Agueda Perez (Spain) Patricia Martínez	
3/7/2024	(Spain) Carmen Goenaga (Argentina) Virginia Riera	6–4 / 1–6 / 6–1	(Spain) Beatriz Caldera (Spain) Lorena Rufo	
3/7/2024	(Spain) Barbara Las Heras (Spain) Victoria Iglesias	6–2 / 2–6 / 6–4	(Spain) Melania Merino (Spain) Sofía Saiz	
3/7/2024	(Russia) Ksenia Sharifova (Spain) Lucía Martínez Gomez	7–6 / 6–3	(Sweden) Carolina Navarro Björk (Italy) Carolina Orsi	

=== Round of 16 ===
Men's

Date	Winners	Score	Opponent	Refs.
4/7/2024	(Argentina) Agustín Tapia (Spain) Arturo Coello	6–3 / 6–2	(Argentina) Gonzalo Alfonso (Spain) Jairo Bautista	
4/7/2024	(Spain) Javier Ruiz (Spain) Pablo Cardona	1–6 / 6–4 / 6–1	(Argentina) Fernando Belasteguín (Argentina) Juan Tello	
4/7/2024	(Spain) Javi Garrido (Spain) Mike Yanguas	6–4 / 6–4	(Spain) José Jimenez Casas (Spain) Pincho Fernandez	
4/7/2024	(Argentina) Franco Stupaczuk (Argentina) Martin Di Nenno	7–5 / 7–5	(Spain) Ignacio Sager (Spain) Salvador Oria	
4/7/2024	(Spain) Juan Lebrón (Spain) Paquito Navarro	6–3 / 6–1	(Spain) Javier Gonzalez Barahona (Spain) Teodoro Zapata	
4/7/2024	(Argentina) Lucho Capra (Argentina) Maxi Sánchez	4–6 / 6–3 / 6–4	(Spain) Alejandro Arroyo (Argentina) Sanyo Gutiérrez	
4/7/2024	(Brazil) Lucas Bergamini (Spain) Víctor Ruiz	6–4 / 6–3	(Spain) Coki Nieto (Spain) Jon Sanz	
4/7/2024	(Spain) Alejandro Galán (Argentina) Federico Chingotto	6–4 / 7–6	(Argentina) Leandro Augsburger (Argentina) Valentino Libaak	

Women's

Date	Winners	Score	Opponent	Refs.
4/7/2024	(Spain) Ariana Sánchez (Spain) Paula Josemaria	6–3 / 6–0	(Spain) Jimena Velasco (Spain) Noa Canovas	
4/7/2024	(Spain) Lucia Sainz (Spain) Patricia Llaguno	6–3 / 6–4	(Portugal) Ana Catarina Nogueira (Spain) Marta Talavan	
4/7/2024	(Argentina) Claudia Jensen (Spain) Jessica Castelló	6–4 / 7–5	(Italy) Carolina Orsi (Spain) Nuria Rodriguez	
4/7/2024	(Spain) Claudia Fernandez (Spain) Gemma Triay	6–0 / 6–2	(Argentina) Aranzazu Osoro (Spain) Marta Marrero	
4/7/2024	(Spain) Marta Ortega (Portugal) Sofia Araújo	6–3 / 6–2	(France) Alix Collombon (Argentina) Julieta Bidahorria	
4/7/2024	(Spain) Alejandra Salazar (Spain) Verónica Virseda	7–6 / 6–4	(Spain) Camila Fassio (Spain) Raquel Eugenio	
4/7/2024	(Spain) Carmen Goenaga (Argentina) Virginia Riera	6–3 / 7–5	(Spain) Barbara Las Heras (Spain) Victoria Iglesias	
4/7/2024	(Spain) Bea González (Argentina) Delfina Brea	6–1 / 6–1	(Russia) Ksenia Sharifova (Spain) Lucía Martínez Gomez	

=== Quarter-Finals ===
Men's

Date	Winners	Score	Opponent	Refs.
5/7/2024	(Argentina) Agustín Tapia (Spain) Arturo Coello	7–5 / 6–3	(Spain) Javier Ruiz (Spain) Pablo Cardona	
5/7/2024	(Argentina) Franco Stupaczuk (Argentina) Martin Di Nenno	6–4 / 6–3	(Spain) Javi Garrido (Spain) Mike Yanguas	
5/7/2024	(Spain) Juan Lebrón (Spain) Paquito Navarro	6–1 / 6–0	(Argentina) Lucho Capra (Argentina) Maxi Sánchez	
5/7/2024	(Spain) Alejandro Galán (Argentina) Federico Chingotto	6–3 / 6–4	(Brazil) Lucas Bergamini (Spain) Víctor Ruiz	

Women's

Date	Winners	Score	Opponent	Refs.
5/7/2024	(Spain) Ariana Sánchez (Spain) Paula Josemaria	6–1 / 6–0	(Spain) Lucia Sainz (Spain) Patricia Llaguno	
5/7/2024	(Spain) Claudia Fernandez (Spain) Gemma Triay	6–3 / 6–3	(Argentina) Claudia Jensen (Spain) Jessica Castelló	
5/7/2024	(Spain) Marta Ortega (Portugal) Sofia Araújo	6–2 / 2–6 / 1–2 / W.O.	(Spain) Alejandra Salazar (Spain) Verónica Virseda	
5/7/2024	(Spain) Carmen Goenaga (Argentina) Virginia Riera	7–5 / 6–2	(Spain) Bea González (Argentina) Delfina Brea	

=== Semi-Finals ===
Men's

Date	Winners	Score	Opponent	Refs.
6/7/2024	(Argentina) Agustín Tapia (Spain) Arturo Coello	7–6 / 6–2	(Argentina) Franco Stupaczuk (Argentina) Martin Di Nenno	
6/7/2024	(Spain) Alejandro Galán (Argentina) Federico Chingotto	4–6 / 7–5 / 6–4	(Spain) Juan Lebrón (Spain) Paquito Navarro	

Women's

Date	Winners	Score	Opponent	Refs.
6/7/2024	(Spain) Ariana Sánchez (Spain) Paula Josemaria	6–3 / 4–6 / 6–2	(Spain) Claudia Fernandez (Spain) Gemma Triay	
6/7/2024	(Spain) Marta Ortega (Portugal) Sofia Araújo	6–1 / 6–4	(Spain) Carmen Goenaga (Argentina) Virginia Riera	

=== Finals ===
Men's

Date	Winners	Score	Opponent	Refs.
7/7/2024	(Spain) Alejandro Galán (Argentina) Federico Chingotto	6–1 / 6–1	(Argentina) Agustín Tapia (Spain) Arturo Coello	

Women's

Date	Winners	Score	Opponent	Refs.
7/7/2024	(Spain) Marta Ortega (Portugal) Sofia Araújo	6–3 / 7–6	(Spain) Ariana Sánchez (Spain) Paula Josemaria	
