= 2024 Italy Major =

Padel championships

- Date: 9 – 16 June
- Edition: 3rd
- Category: Major
- Prize money: €525.000
- Location: Rome, Italy
- Venue: Foro Italico

Champions
- Men's doubles: (Spain) Alejandro Galán (Argentina) Federico Chingotto
- Women's doubles: (Spain) Ariana Sánchez (Spain) Paula Josemaría

Chronology

The 2024 Italy Major (officially 2024 BNL Italy Major Premier Padel) was the eleventh tournament of the third season organized by Premier Padel, promoted by the International Padel Federation, and with the financial backing of Nasser Al-Khelaïfi's Qatar Sports Investments, now serving as the premier padel circuit.

In the women's division, Lucía Sainz and Patty Llaguno, FIP eight ranked team, defeated the second-ranked pair on the way to their second final of the year, where they lost to the first rankeds Ariana Sánchez and Paula Josemaría.

In the men's division, the top two ranked teams met once again in the finals, with Alejandro Galán and Federico Chingotto defeating Agustín Tapia and Arturo Coello, to claim their fourth title of the season.

== Relevant Data ==
=== Former number ones join forces ===
After their early exit in Bordeaux, Maxi Sánchez and Sanyo Gutiérrez announced that the Italy Major would be their last tournament as a pair.

=== Number 5 ===
With their victory in the finals, Galán, Ariana, and Paula secured their fifth title of the season.

== Seeds ==
Male

Rnk.	Team	FIP Ranking Points
1	(Argentina) Agustín Tapia (Spain) Arturo Coello	25803
2	(Spain) Alejandro Galán (Argentina) Federico Chingotto	20453
3	(Argentina) Franco Stupaczuk (Argentina) Martin Di Nenno	17258
4	(Spain) Juan Lebrón (Spain) Paquito Navarro	16995
5	(Argentina) Fernando Belasteguín (Argentina) Juan Tello	8564
6	(Spain) Javi Garrido (Argentina) Miguel Yanguas	8225
7	(Argentina) Aléx Ruiz (Spain) Momo Gonzalez	6819
8	(Argentina) Maxi Sanchéz (Argentina) Sanyo Gutiérrez	6324
9	(Spain) Coki Nieto (Spain) Jon Sanz	5946
10	(Brazil) Lucas Bergamini (Spain) Victor Ruiz	4600
11	(Spain) Alejandro Arroyo (Spain) Eduardo Alonso	3923
12	(Argentina) Alex Chozas (Argentina) Lucho Capra	3138
13	(Spain) Javi Leal (Brazil) Lucas Campagnolo	3051
14	(Spain) Francisco Gil Morales (Argentina) Ramiro Moyano	3049
15	(Spain) Momo Gonzalez (Spain) Pablo Cardona	2677
16	(Spain) Javi Rico (Spain) Juanlu Esbri	2615

Female

Rnk.	Team	FIP Ranking Points
1	(Spain) Ariana Sanchez (Spain) Paula Josemaria	25072
2	(Spain) Claudia Fernandez (Spain) Gemma Triay	14261
3	(Spain) Marta Ortega (Spain) Veronica Virseda	10107
4	(Spain) Alba Gallardo (Argentina) Delfina Brea	9441
5	(Argentina) Claudia Jensen (Spain) Jessica Castello	8948
6	(Portugal) Sofia Araújo (Argentina) Virginia Riera	8377
7	(Spain) Alejandra Salazar (Spain) Carmen Goenaga	7052
8	(Spain) Lucia Sainz (Spain) Patty Llaguno	6832
9	(Spain) Andrea Ustero (Spain) Alejandra Alonso	4083
10	(Argentina) Aranzazu Osoro (Spain) Marta Marrero	3272
11	(Spain) Beatriz Caldera (Spain) Lorena Rufo	2875
12	(Spain) Maria Eulalia Rodriguez Abajo (Spain) Nuria Rodriguez Camacho	2532
13	(Portugal) Ana Catarina Nogueira (Spain) Marta Talavan	2527
14	(Sweden) Carolina Navarro (Italy) Carolina Orsi	2521
15	(Russia) Ksenia Sharifova (Spain) Lucia Martinez	2433
16	(Spain) Araceli Martinez (Spain) Marina Guinart	2326

== Head-to-head record between teams ranked in the top 4 during the season ==
=== Man's ===
Record	Coello–Tapia	Galán–Chingotto	Lebrón–Paquito	Di Nenno–Stupaczuk	Former Pairs	Galán–Lebrón	Paquito–Sanyo
Coello–Tapia	—	3–4	3–0	—		1–1	2–0
Galán–Chingotto	4–3	—	—	6–0		—	—
Lebrón–Paquito	0–3	—	—	0–1		—	—
Di Nenno–Stupaczuk	—	0–6	1–0	—		0–2	—
Former Pairs							
Galán–Lebrón	1–1	—	—	2–0		—	—
Paquito–Sanyo	0–2	—	—	—		—	—

=== Women's ===
Record	Ariana–Paula	Gonzalez–D. Brea	Fernandez–Triay	Icardo–Salazar	Former Pairs	Ortega–Triay	Ortega–Virseda
Ariana–Paula	—	2–1	2–3	1–0		—	1–0
B. Gonzalez–D. Brea	1–2	—	3–0	3–0		—	—
Fernandez–Triay	3–2	0–3	—	0–1		—	1–0
Icardo–Salazar	0–1	0–3	1–0	—		—	—
Former Pairs							
Ortega–Triay	—	—	—	—		—	—
Ortega–Virseda	0–1	—	0–1	—		—	—

== Draws ==
=== Men's Bracket ===
Round of 32
1	(Spain) Coello / (Argentina) Tapia	6	6
Q	(Spain) A. Berdonce / (Spain) M. Hernandez	4	4
20	(Spain) J. Barahona / (Spain) T. Zapata	6	6
14	(Spain) F. Gil / (Argentina) R. Moyano	3	2
16	(Spain) J. Rico / (Spain) J. Esbri	6	6
36	(Spain) C. Marti / (Spain) M. Solbes	4	4
34	(Spain) A. Cepero / (Spain) M. Benitez	4	6
6	(Spain) J. Garrido / (Spain) Yanguas	6	7
7	(Spain) A. Ruiz / (Spain) Momo	7	6
39	(Spain) I. Jofre / (Spain) L.H. Quesada	5	2
Q	(Spain) F. Ramirez / (Spain) V. Mena	4	7	2
12	(Argentina) A. Chozas / (Argentina) L. Capra	6	5	6
10	(Brazil) L. Bergamini / (Spain) V. Ruiz	6	6	6
44	(Argentina) G. Alfonso / (Spain) R.M Duran	4	7	3
28	(Italy) D. Perino / (Spain) P.G. Rodrigo	3	6	5
4	(Spain) Lebrón / (Spain) Paquito	6	4	7
3	(Argentina) F. Stupaczuk / (Argentina) Di Nenno	6	7
32	(Spain) E. Chamero / (Chile) J. Valdes	0	5
21	(Spain) J.G. Diestro / (Spain) P. Lijó	4	1
15	(Spain) J. Ruiz / (Spain) P. Cardona	6	6
7	(Spain) J. Leal / (Brazil) L. Campagnolo	4	7	6
24	(Spain) A. Ayats / (Spain) E. Goenaga	6	6	4
30	(Sweden) D. Windahl / (Spain) J. Marmolejo
5	(Argentina) Belasteguin / (Argentina) J. Tello	6	6
8	(Argentina) Maxi / (Argentina) Sanyo	6	7
26	(Spain) G. Rubio / (Argentina) L. Aguirre	2	6
33	(Spain) I. Vilariño / (Spain) M. Semmler	0	0
11	(Spain) A. Arroyo / (Spain) E. Alonso	6	6
22	(Spain) F. Guerrero / (Spain) J. Bautista	1	6	7
27	(Argentina) L. Augsburger / (Argentina) V. Libaak	6	4	6
WC	(Portugal) N. Deus / (Italy) S. Cremona	0	4
2	(Spain) Galán / (Argentina) F. Chingotto	6	6

Round of 16
1	(Spain) Coello / (Argentina) Tapia	6	4	6
20	(Spain) J. Barahona / (Spain) T. Zapata	4	6	0
16	(Spain) J. Rico / (Spain) J. Esbri	4	6	2
6	(Spain) J. Garrido / (Spain) Yanguas	6	3	6
7	(Spain) A. Ruiz / (Spain) Momo	7	7
12	(Argentina) A. Chozas / (Argentina) L. Capra	5	6
10	(Brazil) L. Bergamini / (Spain) V. Ruiz	1	2
4	(Spain) Lebrón / (Spain) Paquito	6	6
3	(Argentina) F. Stupaczuk / (Argentina) Di Nenno	6	4	6
15	(Spain) J. Ruiz / (Spain) P. Cardona	4	6	3
13	(Spain) J. Leal / (Brazil) L. Campagnolo	6	6
5	(Argentina) Belasteguin / (Argentina) J. Tello	4	4
8	(Argentina) Maxi / (Argentina) Sanyo	2	2
11	(Spain) A. Arroyo / (Spain) E. Alonso	6	6
22	(Spain) F. Guerrero / (Spain) J. Bautista
2	(Spain) Galán / (Argentina) F. Chingotto	*

Quarter-Final
1	(Spain) Coello / (Argentina) Tapia	7	6
6	(Spain) J. Garrido / (Spain) Yanguas	5	4
7	(Spain) A. Ruiz / (Spain) Momo	5	3
4	(Spain) Lebrón / (Spain) Paquito	7	6
3	(Argentina) F. Stupaczuk / (Argentina) Di Nenno	6	6
13	(Spain) J. Leal / (Brazil) L. Campagnolo	2	3
11	(Spain) A. Arroyo / (Spain) E. Alonso	3	1
2	(Spain) Galán / (Argentina) F. Chingotto	6	6

Semi-Finals
1	(Spain) Coello / (Argentina) Tapia	6	6
4	(Spain) Lebrón / (Spain) Paquito	3	1
3	(Argentina) F. Stupaczuk / (Argentina) Di Nenno	2	4
2	(Spain) Galán / (Argentina) F. Chingotto	6	6

Finals
1	(Spain) Coello / (Argentina) Tapia	4	6	1
2	(Spain) Galán / (Argentina) F. Chingotto	6	1	6

=== Women's Bracket ===
Round of 32
1	(Spain) A. Sanchez / (Spain) P. Josemaria	6	6
21	(Spain) M. Merino / (Spain) S. Saiz	1	2
Q	(Spain) R. Barrera / (Spain) M. Goyenche	5	2
11	(Spain) B. Caldera / (Spain) L. Rufo	7	6
9	(Spain) A. Ustero / (Spain) A. Alonso	7	1	6
19	(Spain) B. Las Heras / (Spain) V. Iglesias	5	6	2
22	(Spain) C. Mesa / (Spain) S. Ruiz	7	6
7	(Spain) A. Salazar / (Spain) C. Goenaga	6	3
5	(Argentina) C. Jensen / (Spain) J. Castello	6	6
17	(France) A. Collombon / (Argentina) J. Bidahorria	4	2
25	(Spain) A. Perez / (Spain) P. Martinez	7	6
10	(Argentina) A. Osoro / (Spain) M. Marrero	5	1
13	(Portugal) A. Nogueira / (Spain) M. Talavan	6	6
27	(Spain) A. Soriano / (Italy) C. Casali	0	3
34	(Spain) J. Bautista / (Spain) L. Arruabarrena	3	7	6
4	(Spain) A. Gallardo / (Argentina) D. Brea	6	5	7
3	(Spain) M. Ortega / (Spain) V. Virseda	6	3	6
23	(Spain) M. Barrera / (Spain) M. Caparros	3	6	3
24	(Spain) A. Cañellas / (Spain) T. Navarro	5	1
15	(Russia) K. Sharifova / (Spain) L. Martinez	7	6
12	(Spain) M.R. Abajo / (Spain) N. Rodriguez	6	4	5
28	(Spain) M. Borrero / (Spain) S. Bellver	0	6	7
20	(Spain) E. Carnicero / (Spain) M. Lobo	2	0
8	(Spain) L. Sainz / (Spain) P. Llaguno	6	6
6	(Portugal) S. Araújo / (Argentina) V. Riera	6	6
37	(Italy) C. Pappacena / (Spain) X. Vidiella	0	3
Q	(Spain) A. Moral / (Belgium) H. Wyckaert	2	2
16	(Spain) A. Martinez / (Spain) M. Guinart	6	6
14	(Sweden) C. Navarro / (Italy) C. Orsi	3	4
26	(Italy) G. Marchetti / (France) L. Godallier	6	6
Q	(Spain) C. Velarde / (Spain) M. Arellano	3	1
2	(Spain) C. Fernandez / (Spain) G. Triay	6	6

Round of 16
1	(Spain) A. Sanchez / (Spain) P. Josemaria	6	6
11	(Spain) B. Caldera / (Spain) L. Rufo	2	2
9	(Spain) A. Ustero / (Spain) A. Alonso	4	6	3
22	(Spain) C. Mesa / (Spain) S. Ruiz	6	1	6
5	(Argentina) C. Jensen / (Spain) J. Castello	6	1	*
25	(Spain) A. Perez / (Spain) P. Martinez	3	0
13	(Portugal) A. Nogueira / (Spain) M. Talavan	5	6	2
4	(Spain) A. Gallardo / (Argentina) D. Brea	7	2	6
3	(Spain) M. Ortega / (Spain) V. Virseda	6	2
15	(Russia) K. Sharifova / (Spain) L. Martinez	7	6
28	(Spain) M. Borrero / (Spain) S. Bellver	1	6	0
8	(Spain) L. Sainz / (Spain) P. Llaguno	6	3	6
6	(Portugal) S. Araújo / (Argentina) V. Riera	4	2
16	(Spain) A. Martinez / (Spain) M. Guinart	6	6
26	(Italy) G. Marchetti / (France) L. Godallier	1	2
2	(Spain) C. Fernandez / (Spain) G. Triay	6	6

Quarter-Final
1	(Spain) A. Sanchez / (Spain) P. Josemaria	6	6
9	(Spain) A. Ustero / (Spain) A. Alonso	2	1
5	(Argentina) C. Jensen / (Spain) J. Castello	6	6
4	(Spain) A. Gallardo / (Argentina) D. Brea	1	2
15	(Russia) K. Sharifova / (Spain) L. Martinez	0	4
8	(Spain) L. Sainz / (Spain) P. Llaguno	6	6
16	(Spain) A. Martinez / (Spain) M. Guinart	0	1
2	(Spain) C. Fernandez / (Spain) G. Triay	6	6

Semi-Finals
1	(Spain) A. Sanchez / (Spain) P. Josemaria	7	6
5	(Argentina) C. Jensen / (Spain) J. Castello	6	4
8	(Spain) L. Sainz / (Spain) P. Llaguno	7	6
2	(Spain) C. Fernandez / (Spain) G. Triay	5	4

Finals
1	(Spain) A. Sanchez / (Spain) P. Josemaria	6	6
8	(Spain) L. Sainz / (Spain) P. Llaguno	1	0

== Results ==
=== First Round ===
Men's

Date	Winners	Score	Opponent	Refs.
17/6/2024	(Spain) Adrian Marques (Spain) Mario Huete	6–2 / 6–2	(Argentina) Agustin Gomez Silingo (Portugal) Gustavo Nunes	
18/6/2024	(Spain) Javier Gonzalez Barahona (Spain) Teodoro Zapata	6–3 / 4–6 / 6–3	(Argentina) Agustin Gutiérrez (Spain) José Rico	
17/6/2024	(Spain) Francisco Gil Morales (Argentina) Ramiro Moyano	6–2 / 6–2	(Argentina) Michele Bruno (Italy) Simone Iacovino	
18/6/2024	(Spain) Javier Rico (Spain) Juanlu Esbri	6–4 / 7–5	(Argentina) Juan Cruz Belluati (Argentina) Miguel Lamperti	
17/6/2024	(Spain) Carlos Marti (Spain) Miguel Solbes	6–3 / 6–2	(Italy) Flavio Abbate (Italy) Giulio Graziotti	
18/6/2024	(Spain) Álvero Cepero (Spain) Miguel Benítez	6–7 / 6–1 / 6–4	(Spain) Javier García Mora (Spain) Jaime Muñoz	
18/6/2024	(Spain) Inigo Jofre (Spain) Luis Hernandez Quesada	4–6 / 6–3 / 6–4	(Spain) Ignacio Sager (Spain) Salvador Oria	
17/6/2024	(Spain) Fran Ramirez (Spain) Victor Mena Gil	6–3 / 6–3	(Spain) Jose Sanchez Serrano (Spain) Mario Ortega	
18/6/2024	(Argentina) Alex Chozas (Argentina) Luciano Capra	6–1 / 3–6 / 6–4	(Italy) Aris Patiniotis (Italy) Facundo Dominguez	
18/6/2024	(Brazil) Lucas Bergamini (Spain) Víctor Ruiz	6–2 / 6–1	(Spain) Jose Roman Martinez Sanchis (Spain) Pablo Castillo Valverde	
17/6/2024	(Argentina) Gonzalo Alfonso (Spain) Raúl Marcos Duran	6–4 / 6–3	(Argentina) Dylan Cuello (Italy) Marco Cassetta	
18/6/2024	(Italy) Denis Perino (Spain) Pablo García Rodrigo	6–4 / 6–1	(Portugal) Alfonso Fazendeiro (Spain) Pedro Vera Castillo	
17/6/2024	(Spain) Emilio Sanchez Chamero (Chile) Javier Valdes	6–4 / 6–2	(Spain) Jose Luis Gonzalez (Spain) Marc Quilez	
18/6/2024	(Spain) Jose García Diestro (Spain) Pablo Lijo	7–6 / 6–3	(Spain) Jesus Moya (Portugal) Miguel Deus	
17/6/2024	(Spain) Javier Leal (Brazil) Lucas Campagnolo	6–2 / 6–1	(Spain) Mario Del Castillo (Spain) Rafael Mendez	
18/6/2024	(Spain) Arnau Ayats (Spain) Enrique Goenaga	6–2 / 6–3	(Argentina) Cristian German Gutierrez (Spain) Jorge Ruiz Gutierrez	
17/6/2024	(Sweden) Daniel Windahl (Spain) Jose Solano Marmolejo	7–5 / 6–3	(Spain) Alvaro Melendez Amaya (Spain) Pedro Melendez Amaya	
18/6/2024	(Spain) Gonzalo Rubio (Argentina) Leonel Aguirre	6–4 / 6–4	(Spain) Ivan Ramirez (Spain) Pol Hernandez	
17/6/2024	(Spain) Ignacio Vilariño (Spain) Miguel Semmler	5–7 / 6–3 / 6–1	(Spain) Ferran Insa Sotillo (Spain) Roger Aromi Siquier	
17/6/2024	(Spain) Alejandro Arroyo (Spain) Eduardo Alonso	6–2 / 7–6	(Spain) Guillermo Collado (Spain) Javier Martinez Vazquez	
18/6/2024	(Spain) Francisco Guerrero (Spain) Jairo Bautista	7–6 / 6–7 / 7–5	(Spain) Coki Nieto (Spain) Jon Sanz	
17/6/2024	(Argentina) Leandro Augsburger (Argentina) Valentino Libaak	6–4 / 6–2	(Spain) Diego Gil Batista (Spain) Miguel Gonzalez	
18/6/2024	(Portugal) Nuno Deus (Italy) Simone Cremona	6–1 / 6–4	(Italy) Lorenzo Di Giovanni (Italy) Riccardo Sinicropi	

Women's

Date	Winners	Score	Opponent	Refs.
18/6/2024	(Spain) Melania Merino (Spain) Sofía Saiz	7–6 / 6–2	(Brazil) Manuela Schuck (Spain) Sara Pujals	
17/6/2024	(Spain) Martina Fassio Goyenche (Spain) Raquel Eugenio Barrera	6–4 / 6–1	(Sweden) Amanda Girdo (Spain) Ana Varo Ramos	
18/6/2024	(Spain) Barbara Las Heras (Spain) Victoria Iglesias	7–5 / 6–2	(Spain) Jimena Velasco (Spain) Noa Canovas	
18/6/2024	(Spain) Carla Mesa (Spain) Sara Ruiz	6–2 / 6–0	(Spain) María Castañera (Spain) Mireia Herrada Ruiz	
18/6/2024	(France) Alix Collombon (Argentina) Julieta Bidahorria	6–2 / 6–1	(Spain) Lorena Alonso (Spain) Raquel Segura	
18/6/2024	(Spain) Agueda Perez (Spain) Patricia Martínez	6–3 / 6–4	(Spain) Lucía Peralta (Portugal) Patricia Ribeiro	
18/6/2024	(Spain) Arantxa Soriano Perez (Italy) Carlotta Casali	6–4 / 6–7 / 7–6	(Italy) Emily Stellato (Italy) Giulia Sussarello	
18/6/2024	(Spain) Julia Polo Bautista (Spain) Lara Arruabarrena	6–2 / 6–2	(Netherlands) Marcella Koek (Netherlands) Steffie Weterings	
18/6/2024	(Spain) Marta Barrera (Spain) Marta Caparrós	6–0 / 6–1	(Argentina) Marianela Montesi (Italy) Valentina Tommasi	
18/6/2024	(Spain) Ariadna Cañellas (Spain) Teresa Navarro	6–3 / 6–3	(Italy) Erika Zanchetta (Italy) Martina Parmigiani	
18/6/2024	(Spain) Marta Borrero (Spain) Sandra Bellver	6–2 / 6–3	(Spain) Aida Martinez Sanjuan (Spain) Aitana Garcia Roman	
18/6/2024	(Spain) Esther Carnicero (Spain) Melania Merino Saez	6–2 / 6–4	(Spain) Ana Dominguez Gracia (Spain) Laura Lujan Rodriguez	
18/6/2024	(Italy) Chiara Pappacena (Spain) Xenia Clasca	6–2 / 7–6	(Spain) Carmen Castillon (Brazil) Raquel Piltcher	
18/6/2024	(Spain) Amanda Lopez Moral (Belgium) Helena Wyckaert	4–6 / 7–6 / 1–1 / W.O.	(Spain) Ana Fernandez de Osso (Spain) Nuria Vivancos	
18/6/2024	(Italy) Giorgia Marchetti (France) Lea Godallier	5–7 / 6–3 / 6–1	(Spain) Alicia Blanco Rojo (Italy) Lorena Vano	
18/6/2024	(Spain) Carla Castillo (Spain) Marta Arellano Navarro	6–3 / 6–3	(Spain) Letizia Manquillo (Spain) Noemi Aguilar	

=== Round of 32 ===
Men's

Date	Winners	Score	Opponent	Refs.
19/6/2024	(Argentina) Agustín Tapia (Spain) Arturo Coello	6–4 / 6–4	(Spain) Adrian Marques (Spain) Mario Huete	
19/6/2024	(Spain) Javier Gonzalez Barahona (Spain) Teodoro Zapata	6–3 / 6–2	(Spain) Francisco Gil Morales (Argentina) Ramiro Moyano	
19/6/2024	(Spain) Javier Rico (Spain) Juanlu Esbri	6–4 / 6–4	(Spain) Carlos Marti (Spain) Miguel Solbes	
19/6/2024	(Spain) Javi Garrido (Spain) Mike Yanguas	6–4 / 7–6	(Spain) Álvero Cepero (Spain) Miguel Benítez	
19/6/2024	(Spain) Alex Ruiz (Spain) Momo Gonzalez	7–5 / 6–2	(Spain) Inigo Jofre (Spain) Luis Hernandez Quesada	
19/6/2024	(Argentina) Alex Chozas (Argentina) Luciano Capra	6–4 / 5–7 / 6–2	(Spain) Fran Ramirez (Spain) Victor Mena Gil	
19/6/2024	(Brazil) Lucas Bergamini (Spain) Víctor Ruiz	6–4 / 6–7 / 6–3	(Argentina) Gonzalo Alfonso (Spain) Raúl Marcos Duran	
19/6/2024	(Spain) Juan Lebrón (Spain) Paquito Navarro	6–3 / 4–6 / 7–5	(Italy) Denis Perino (Spain) Pablo García Rodrigo	
19/6/2024	(Argentina) Franco Stupaczuk (Argentina) Martin Di Nenno	6–0 / 7–5	(Spain) Emilio Sanchez Chamero (Chile) Javier Valdes	
19/6/2024	(Spain) Javier Ruiz (Spain) Pablo Cardona	6–4 / 6–1	(Spain) Jose García Diestro (Spain) Pablo Lijo	
19/6/2024	(Spain) Javier Leal (Brazil) Lucas Campagnolo	4–6 / 7–6 / 6–4	(Spain) Arnau Ayats (Spain) Enrique Goenaga	
19/6/2024	(Argentina) Fernando Belasteguín (Argentina) Juan Tello	6–4 / 6–4	(Sweden) Daniel Windahl (Spain) Jose Solano Marmolejo	
19/6/2024	(Argentina) Maxi Sánchez (Argentina) Sanyo Gutiérrez	6–2 / 7–6	(Spain) Gonzalo Rubio (Argentina) Leonel Aguirre	
19/6/2024	(Spain) Alejandro Arroyo (Spain) Eduardo Alonso	6–0 / 6–0	(Spain) Ignacio Vilariño (Spain) Miguel Semmler	
19/6/2024	(Spain) Francisco Guerrero (Spain) Jairo Bautista	1–6 / 6–4 / 7–6	(Argentina) Leandro Augsburger (Argentina) Valentino Libaak	
19/6/2024	(Spain) Alejandro Galán (Argentina) Federico Chingotto	6–0 / 6–4	(Portugal) Nuno Deus (Italy) Simone Cremona	

Women's

Date	Winners	Score	Opponent	Refs.
19/6/2024	(Spain) Ariana Sánchez (Spain) Paula Josemaria	6–1 / 6–2	(Spain) Melania Merino (Spain) Sofía Saiz	
19/6/2024	(Spain) Beatriz Caldera (Spain) Lorena Rufo	7–5 / 6–2	(Spain) Martina Fassio Goyenche (Spain) Raquel Eugenio Barrera	
19/6/2024	(Spain) Alejandra Alonso (Spain) Andrea Ustero	7–5 / 1–6 / 6–2	(Spain) Barbara Las Heras (Spain) Victoria Iglesias	
19/6/2024	(Spain) Carla Mesa (Spain) Sara Ruiz	7–6 / 6–3	(Spain) Alejandra Salazar (Spain) Carmen Goenaga	
19/6/2024	(Argentina) Claudia Jensen (Spain) Jessica Castelló	6–4 / 6–2	(France) Alix Collombon (Argentina) Julieta Bidahorria	
19/6/2024	(Spain) Agueda Perez (Spain) Patricia Martínez	7–5 / 6–1	(Argentina) Aranzazu Osoro (Spain) Marta Marrero	
19/6/2024	(Portugal) Ana Catarina Nogueira (Spain) Marta Talavan	6–0 / 6–3	(Spain) Arantxa Soriano Perez (Italy) Carlotta Casali	
19/6/2024	(Spain) Alba Gallardo Salvado (Argentina) Delfina Brea	6–3 / 5–7 / 7–6	(Spain) Julia Polo Bautista (Spain) Lara Arruabarrena	
19/6/2024	(Spain) Marta Ortega (Spain) Verónica Virseda	6–3 / 3–6 / 6–3	(Spain) Marta Barrera (Spain) Marta Caparrós	
19/6/2024	(Russia) Ksenia Sharifova (Spain) Lucía Martínez Gomez	7–5 / 6–1	(Spain) Ariadna Cañellas (Spain) Teresa Navarro	
19/6/2024	(Spain) Marta Borrero (Spain) Sandra Bellver	0–6 / 6–4 / 7–5	(Spain) Laia Rodriguez Abajo (Spain) Nuria Rodriguez	
19/6/2024	(Spain) Lucia Sainz (Spain) Patricia Llaguno	6–2 / 6–0	(Spain) Esther Carnicero (Spain) Melania Merino Saez	
19/6/2024	(Portugal) Sofia Araújo (Argentina) Virginia Riera	6–0 / 6–3	(Italy) Chiara Pappacena (Spain) Xenia Clasca	
19/6/2024	(Spain) Araceli Martinez (Spain) Marina Guinart	6–2 / 6–2	(Spain) Amanda Lopez Moral (Belgium) Helena Wyckaert	
19/6/2024	(Italy) Giorgia Marchetti (France) Lea Godallier	6–3 / 6–4	(Sweden) Carolina Navarro Björk (Italy) Carolina Orsi	
19/6/2024	(Spain) Claudia Fernández (Spain) Gemma Triay	6–3 / 6–1	(Spain) Carla Castillo (Spain) Marta Arellano Navarro	

=== Round of 16 ===
Men's

Date	Winners	Score	Opponent	Refs.
20/6/2024	(Argentina) Agustín Tapia (Spain) Arturo Coello	6–4 / 4–6 / 6–0	(Spain) Javier Gonzalez Barahona (Spain) Teodoro Zapata	
20/6/2024	(Spain) Javi Garrido (Spain) Mike Yanguas	6–4 / 3–6 / 6–2	(Spain) Javier Rico (Spain) Juanlu Esbri	
20/6/2024	(Spain) Alex Ruiz (Spain) Momo Gonzalez	7–5 / 7–6	(Argentina) Alex Chozas (Argentina) Luciano Capra	
20/6/2024	(Spain) Juan Lebrón (Spain) Paquito Navarro	6–1 / 6–2	(Brazil) Lucas Bergamini (Spain) Víctor Ruiz	
20/6/2024	(Argentina) Franco Stupaczuk (Argentina) Martin Di Nenno	6–4 / 4–6 / 6–3	(Spain) Javier Ruiz (Spain) Pablo Cardona	
20/6/2024	(Spain) Javier Leal (Brazil) Lucas Campagnolo	6–4 / 6–4	(Argentina) Fernando Belasteguín (Argentina) Juan Tello	
20/6/2024	(Spain) Alejandro Arroyo (Spain) Eduardo Alonso	6–2 / 6–2	(Argentina) Maxi Sánchez (Argentina) Sanyo Gutiérrez	
20/6/2024	(Spain) Alejandro Galán (Argentina) Federico Chingotto	W.O.	(Spain) Francisco Guerrero (Spain) Jairo Bautista	

Women's

Date	Winners	Score	Opponent	Refs.
20/6/2024	(Spain) Ariana Sánchez (Spain) Paula Josemaria	6–2 / 6–2	(Spain) Beatriz Caldera (Spain) Lorena Rufo	
20/6/2024	(Spain) Carla Mesa (Spain) Sara Ruiz	6–4 / 1–6 / 6–3	(Spain) Alejandra Alonso (Spain) Andrea Ustero	
20/6/2024	(Argentina) Claudia Jensen (Spain) Jessica Castelló	6–1 / 3–0 / W.O.	(Spain) Agueda Perez (Spain) Patricia Martínez	
20/6/2024	(Spain) Alba Gallardo Salvado (Argentina) Delfina Brea	7–5 / 2–6 / 6–2	(Portugal) Ana Catarina Nogueira (Spain) Marta Talavan	
20/6/2024	(Russia) Ksenia Sharifova (Spain) Lucía Martínez Gomez	7–6 / 6–2	(Spain) Marta Ortega (Spain) Verónica Virseda	
20/6/2024	(Spain) Lucia Sainz (Spain) Patricia Llaguno	6–1 / 3–6 / 6–0	(Spain) Marta Borrero (Spain) Sandra Bellver	
20/6/2024	(Spain) Araceli Martinez (Spain) Marina Guinart	6–4 / 6–2	(Portugal) Sofia Araújo (Argentina) Virginia Riera	
20/6/2024	(Spain) Claudia Fernández (Spain) Gemma Triay	6–1 / 6–2	(Italy) Giorgia Marchetti (France) Lea Godallier	

=== Quarter-Finals ===
Men's

Date	Winners	Score	Opponent	Refs.
21/6/2024	(Argentina) Agustín Tapia (Spain) Arturo Coello	7–5 / 6–4	(Spain) Javi Garrido (Spain) Mike Yanguas	
21/6/2024	(Spain) Juan Lebrón (Spain) Paquito Navarro	7–5 / 6–3	(Spain) Alex Ruiz (Spain) Momo Gonzalez	
21/6/2024	(Argentina) Franco Stupaczuk (Argentina) Martin Di Nenno	6–2 / 6–3	(Spain) Javier Leal (Brazil) Lucas Campagnolo	
21/6/2024	(Spain) Alejandro Galán (Argentina) Federico Chingotto	6–3 / 6–1	(Spain) Alejandro Arroyo (Spain) Eduardo Alonso	

Women's

Date	Winners	Score	Opponent	Refs.
21/6/2024	(Spain) Ariana Sánchez (Spain) Paula Josemaria	6–2 / 6–1	(Spain) Carla Mesa (Spain) Sara Ruiz	
21/6/2024	(Argentina) Claudia Jensen (Spain) Jessica Castelló	6–1 / 6–2	(Spain) Alba Gallardo Salvado (Argentina) Delfina Brea	
21/6/2024	(Spain) Lucia Sainz (Spain) Patricia Llaguno	6–0 / 6–4	(Russia) Ksenia Sharifova (Spain) Lucía Martínez Gomez	
21/6/2024	(Spain) Claudia Fernández (Spain) Gemma Triay	6–0 / 6–1	(Spain) Araceli Martinez (Spain) Marina Guinart	

=== Semi-Finals ===
Men's

Date	Winners	Score	Opponent	Refs.
22/6/2024	(Argentina) Agustín Tapia (Spain) Arturo Coello	6–3 / 6–1	(Spain) Juan Lebrón (Spain) Paquito Navarro	
22/6/2024	(Spain) Alejandro Galán (Argentina) Federico Chingotto	6–2 / 6–4	(Argentina) Franco Stupaczuk (Argentina) Martin Di Nenno	

Women's

Date	Winners	Score	Opponent	Refs.
22/6/2024	(Spain) Ariana Sánchez (Spain) Paula Josemaria	7–6 / 6–4	(Argentina) Claudia Jensen (Spain) Jessica Castelló	
22/6/2024	(Spain) Lucia Sainz (Spain) Patricia Llaguno	7–5 / 6–4	(Spain) Claudia Fernández (Spain) Gemma Triay	

=== Finals ===
Men's

Date	Winners	Score	Opponent	Refs.
23/6/2024	(Spain) Alejandro Galán (Argentina) Federico Chingotto	6–4 / 1–6 / 6–1	(Argentina) Agustín Tapia (Spain) Arturo Coello	

Women's

Date	Winners	Score	Opponent	Refs.
23/6/2024	(Spain) Ariana Sánchez (Spain) Paula Josemaria	6–1 / 6–0	(Spain) Lucia Sainz (Spain) Patricia Llaguno	
