= 2024 Qatar Major =

Padel championships

- Date: 1 March – 8 March
- Edition: 3rd
- Category: Major
- Prize money: €525.000
- Location: Doha, Qatar
- Venue: Khalifa International Tennis and Squash Complex

Champions
- Men's doubles: (Argentina) Agustín Tapia (Spain) Arturo Coello
- Women's doubles: (Argentina) Ariana Sanchez (Spain) Paula Josemaria

Chronology

The 2024 Qatar Major (officially 2024 Ooredoo Qatar Major Premier Padel) was the second tournament of the third season organized by Premier Padel, promoted by the International Padel Federation, and with the financial backing of Nasser Al-Khelaïfi's Qatar Sports Investments, now serving as the premier padel circuit.

In the women's final, FIP number 1 ranked team, Ariana Sanchez and Paula Josemaria defeated Claudia Fernández and Gemma Triay, FIP's new number 3 ranked team, winning their second consecutive tournament of the season.

In the men's division, Javi Garrido and Mike Yanguas reached the finals after surprisingly eliminating the No. 1 and No. 3 pairs, Galán/Lebrón and Franco Stupaczuk/Di Nenno, in the round of 16 and semifinals respectively, but lost in two sets to the No. 2 ranked Agustín Tapia and Arturo Coello. With this win Coello and Tapia became the new number one ranked team in the circuit.

== Relevant Data ==
With this tournament win, Arturo Coello won his 20th title as professional.

== Seeds ==
Male

| Rnk. | Team | FIP Ranking Points |
|---|---|---|
| 1 | (Spain) Alejandro Galán (Spain) Juan Lebrón | 21044 |
| 2 | (Argentina) Agustín Tapia (Spain) Arturo Coello | 19110 |
| 3 | (Argentina) Franco Stupaczuk (Argentina) Martin Di Nenno | 17565 |
| 4 | (Spain) Paquito Navarro (Argentina) Sanyo Gutiérrez | 11588 |
| 5 | (Argentina) Federico Chingotto (Spain) Momo Gonzalez | 10802 |
| 6 | (Argentina) Fernando Belasteguín (Argentina) Lucho Capra | 9241 |
| 7 | (Spain) Alejandro Ruiz (Argentina) Juan Tello | 8011 |
| 8 | (Brazil) Lucas Bergamini (Spain) Victor Ruiz | 5453 |

Female

| Rnk. | Team | FIP Ranking Points |
|---|---|---|
| 1 | (Spain) Ariana Sanchez (Spain) Paula Josemaria | 22808 |
| 2 | (Spain) Beatriz Gonzalez (Argentina) Delfina Brea | 16547 |
| 3 | (Spain) Gemma Triay (Spain) Claudia Fernandez | 10122 |
| 4 | (Spain) Marta Ortega (Spain) Veronica Virseda | 9993 |
| 5 | (Spain) Alejandra Salazar (Spain) Tamara Icardo | 9108 |
| 6 | (Portugal) Sofia Araújo (Argentina) Virginia Riera | 7981 |
| 7 | (Argentina) Claudia Jensen (Spain) Jessica Castello | 6876 |
| 8 | (Argentina) Barbara Las Heras (Spain) Victoria Iglesias | 5176 |

== Head-to-head record between teams ranked in the top 4 during the season ==
=== Man's ===
| Event | Coello–Tapia | Galán–Lebrón | Di Nenno–Stupaczuk | Paquito–Sanyo |
| Coello–Tapia | — | 0–1 | — | 1–0 |
| Galán–Lebrón | 1–0 | — | 1–0 | — |
| Di Nenno–Stupaczuk | — | 0–1 | — | — |
| Paquito–Sanyo | 0–1 | — | — | — |

=== Women's ===
| Event | Ariana–Paula | Gonzalez–D. Brea | Fernandez–Triay | Ortega–Virseda | Former Pairs | Ortega–Triay | Icardo–Salazar |
| Ariana–Paula | — | 1–0 | 1–0 | 1–0 | | — | 1–0 |
| B. Gonzalez–D. Brea | 0–1 | — | — | — | | — | — |
| Fernandez–Triay | 0–1 | — | — | — | | — | — |
| Ortega–Virseda | 0–1 | — | — | — | | — | — |
| Former Pairs | | | | | | | |
| Ortega–Triay | — | — | — | — | | — | — |
| Icardo–Salazar | 0–1 | — | — | — | | — | — |

== Draws ==
=== Men's Bracket ===
Round of 32
1 | (Spain) Galán / (Spain) Lebrón | 6 | 6
(Sweden) D. Windahl / (Spain) J. Marmolejo | 3 | 3
(Spain) A. Ayats / (Spain) F. Guerrero | 7 | 0 | 3
10 | (Spain) J. Garrido / (Spain) Yanguas | 6 | 6 | 6
14 | (Spain) A. Arroyo / (Spain) E. Alonso | 6 | 7
(Argentina) F. Mouriño / (Spain) V. Mena | 3 | 5
(Argentina) A. Chozas / (Italy) D. Perino | 5 | 4
7 | (Spain) A. Ruiz / (Argentina) J. Tello | 7 | 6
5 | (Argentina) F. Chingotto / (Spain) Momo | 6 | 6
Q | (Argentina) L. Augsburger / (Argentina) V. Libaak | 4 | 3
(Spain) J.J. Casas / (Argentina) M. Lamperti | 6 | 4
11 | (Spain) G. Rubio / (Argentina) Maxi | 7 | 6
(Spain) D. Gil / (Spain) J. Moya | 6 | 4 | 4
Q | (Spain) Carlos Marti / (Spain) Miguel Solbes | 3 | 6 | 6
(Spain) I. Jofre / (Spain) L.H. Quesada | 2 | 3
3 | (Argentina) F. Stupaczuk / (Argentina) Di Nenno | 6 | 6
4 | (Spain) Paquito / (Argentina) Sanyo | 6 | 6
Q | (Italy) E. Iriart / (Spain) M. Cordoba | 2 | 2
(Spain) J. Rico / (Spain) J. Esbri | 2 | 7 | 6
(Spain) J.G. Barahona / (Spain) J.G. Mora | 6 | 6 | 1
(Spain) J. Munoz / (Spain) J. Bautista | 2 | 6 | 4
(Spain) J. Ruiz / (Spain) P. Cardona | 6 | 3 | 6
(Spain) A. Amaya / (Spain) P. Amaya | 6 | 3
6 | (Argentina) F. Belasteguín / (Argentina) L. Capra | 7 | 6
8 | (Brazil) L. Bergamini / (Spain) V. Ruiz | 6 | 6
(Spain) M. Semmler / (Spain) P. Lijó | 2 | 2
(Spain) I. Vilariño / (Spain) J. Rico | 2 | 2
9 | (Spain) Coki / (Spain) J. Sanz | 6 | 6
16 | (Argentina) J.C. Belluati / (Spain) P. Fernandez | 6 | 3 | 7
(Spain) A. Garcia / (Spain) M. Huete | 4 | 6 | 5
(Spain) E. Goenaga / (Spain) T. Zapata
2 | (Spain) Coello / (Argentina) Tapia | *

Round of 16
1 | (Spain) Galán / (Spain) Lebrón | 7 | 6 | 4
10 | (Spain) J. Garrido / (Spain) Yanguas | 6 | 7 | 6
14 | (Spain) A. Arroyo / (Spain) E. Alonso | 6 | 7
7 | (Spain) A. Ruiz / (Argentina) J. Tello | 4 | 6
5 | (Argentina) F. Chingotto / (Spain) Momo | 6 | 6
11 | (Spain) G. Rubio / (Argentina) Maxi | 2 | 0
Q | (Spain) Carlos Marti / (Spain) Miguel Solbes | 3 | 3
3 | (Argentina) F. Stupaczuk / (Argentina) Di Nenno | 6 | 6
4 | (Spain) Paquito / (Argentina) Sanyo | 6 | 6 | 6
(Spain) J. Rico / (Spain) J. Esbri | 4 | 7 | 1
(Spain) J. Ruiz / (Spain) P. Cardona | 6 | 6
6 | (Argentina) F. Belasteguín / (Argentina) L. Capra | 1 | 4
8 | (Brazil) L. Bergamini / (Spain) V. Ruiz | 6 | 7 | 1
9 | (Spain) Coki / (Spain) J. Sanz | 7 | 6 | 6
16 | (Argentina) J.C. Belluati / (Spain) P. Fernandez | 2 | 4
2 | (Spain) Coello / (Argentina) Tapia | 6 | 6

Quarter-Final
10 | (Spain) J. Garrido / (Spain) Yanguas | 7 | 6
14 | (Spain) A. Arroyo / (Spain) E. Alonso | 5 | 4
5 | (Argentina) F. Chingotto / (Spain) Momo | 3 | 3
3 | (Argentina) F. Stupaczuk / (Argentina) Di Nenno | 6 | 6
4 | (Spain) Paquito / (Argentina) Sanyo | 6 | 6
(Spain) J. Ruiz / (Spain) P. Cardona | 4 | 4
9 | (Spain) Coki / (Spain) J. Sanz | 2 | 2
2 | (Spain) Coello / (Argentina) Tapia | 6 | 6

Semi-Finals
10 | (Spain) J. Garrido / (Spain) Yanguas | 6 | 7
3 | (Argentina) F. Stupaczuk / (Argentina) Di Nenno | 2 | 6
4 | (Spain) Paquito / (Argentina) Sanyo | 0 | 4
2 | (Spain) Coello / (Argentina) Tapia | 6 | 6

Finals
10 | (Spain) J. Garrido / (Spain) Yanguas | 0 | 2
2 | (Spain) Coello / (Argentina) Tapia | 6 | 6

=== Women's Bracket ===
Round of 32
1 | (Spain) A. Sanchez / (Spain) P. Josemaria | 6 | 6
(Spain) A. Cañellas / (Spain) T. Navarro | 0 | 3
(Spain) M. Barrera / (Spain) M. Caparros
15 | (Portugal) A. Nogueira / (Spain) B. Sanchez | 6 | 6
16 | (Spain) A. Alonso / (Spain) A. Ustero | 6 | 6
Q | (Spain) A. Irun / (Spain) M. Pou | 3 | 2
(Spain) A. Perez / (Spain) P. Martinez | 6 | 3 | 0
7 | (Argentina) C. Jensen / (Spain) J. Castello | 4 | 6 | 6
6 | (Portugal) S. Araújo / (Argentina) V. Riera | 6 | 6 | 3
(Spain) E. Carnicero / (Russia) K. Sharifova | 7 | 1 | 6
(Italy) G. Marchetti / (Spain) S. Pujals | 2 | 4
14 | (Italy) C. Orsi / (Spain) M. Lobo | 6 | 6
12 | (Spain) M. Talavan / (Spain) N. Rodriguez | 7 | 6
Q | (Netherlands) M. Koek / (Netherlands) S. Weterings | 6 | 1
(Spain) C. Castillon / (Brazil) R. Piltcher | 4 | 2
4 | (Spain) M. Ortega / (Spain) V. Virseda | 6 | 6
3 | (Spain) G. Triay / (Spain) C. Fernandez | 6 | 6
(France) A. Collombon / (France) J. Barbier | 2 | 0
(Spain) A. Soriano Perez / (Spain) C. Mesa | 0 | 2
11 | (Spain) L. Rufo / (Spain) L. Martinez | 6 | 6
9 | (Spain) L. Sainz / (Spain) P. Llaguno | 6 | 6
(Italy) C. Pappacena / (Spain) X. Vidiella | 3 | 2
(Italy) L. Vano Martin / (Brazil) M. Schuck | 6 | 6
8 | (Spain) B. Las Heras / (Spain) V. Iglesias | 2 | 3
5 | (Spain) A. Salazar / (Spain) T. Icardo | 3 | 6 | 6
(Spain) J. Velasco / (Spain) N. Canovas | 6 | 4 | 1
(Spain) M. Merino / (Spain) S. Saiz | 7 | 2 | 7
13 | (Sweden) C. Navarro / (Spain) M. Guinart | 6 | 6 | 5
10 | (Argentina) A. Osoro / (Spain) C. Goenaga | 6 | 6
(Italy) C. Casali / (Spain) L. Arruabarrena
(Spain) M. Goyenche / (Spain) M. Borrero | 1 | 2
2 | (Spain) B. Gonzalez / (Argentina) D. Brea | 6 | 6

Round of 16
1 | (Spain) A. Sanchez / (Spain) P. Josemaria | 7 | 6
15 | (Portugal) A. Nogueira / (Spain) B. Sanchez | 6 | 0
16 | (Spain) A. Alonso / (Spain) A. Ustero | 2 | 6 | 4
7 | (Argentina) C. Jensen / (Spain) J. Castello | 6 | 3 | 6
(Spain) E. Carnicero / (Russia) K. Sharifova | 6 | 7
14 | (Italy) C. Orsi / (Spain) M. Lobo | 3 | 6
12 | (Spain) M. Talavan / (Spain) N. Rodriguez | 5 | 3
4 | (Spain) M. Ortega / (Spain) V. Virseda | 6 | 6
3 | (Spain) G. Triay / (Spain) C. Fernandez | 6 | 6
11 | (Spain) L. Rufo / (Spain) L. Martinez | 1 | 2
9 | (Spain) L. Sainz / (Spain) P. Llaguno | 6 | 6
(Italy) L. Vano Martin / (Brazil) M. Schuck | 2 | 0
5 | (Spain) A. Salazar / (Spain) T. Icardo | 6 | 6
(Spain) M. Merino / (Spain) S. Saiz | 2 | 1
10 | (Argentina) A. Osoro / (Spain) C. Goenaga | 4 | 1
2 | (Spain) B. Gonzalez / (Argentina) D. Brea | 6 | 6

Quarter-Final
1 | (Spain) A. Sanchez / (Spain) P. Josemaria | 6 | 6
7 | (Argentina) C. Jensen / (Spain) J. Castello | 3 | 3
(Spain) E. Carnicero / (Russia) K. Sharifova | 2 | 0
4 | (Spain) M. Ortega / (Spain) V. Virseda | 6 | 6
3 | (Spain) G. Triay / (Spain) C. Fernandez | 6 | 6
9 | (Spain) L. Sainz / (Spain) P. Llaguno | 1 | 3
5 | (Spain) A. Salazar / (Spain) T. Icardo | 2 | 7 | 6
2 | (Spain) B. Gonzalez / (Argentina) D. Brea | 6 | 5 | 1

Semi-Finals
1 | (Spain) A. Sanchez / (Spain) P. Josemaria | 4 | 6 | 6
4 | (Spain) M. Ortega / (Spain) V. Virseda | 6 | 2 | 4
3 | (Spain) G. Triay / (Spain) C. Fernandez | 7 | 6
5 | (Spain) A. Salazar / (Spain) T. Icardo | 5 | 4

Finals
1 | (Spain) A. Sanchez / (Spain) P. Josemaria | 6 | 6
3 | (Spain) G. Triay / (Spain) C. Fernandez | 3 | 1

== Results ==
=== First Round ===
Men's

| Date | Winners | Score | Opponent | Refs. |
|---|---|---|---|---|
| 3/3/2024 | (Sweden) Daniel Windahl (Spain) Jose Solano Marmolejo | 6–3 / 7–5 | (Argentina) Ignacio Piotto (Spain) Mario Ortega | |
| 3/3/2024 | (Spain) Arnau Ayats (Spain) Francisco Guerrero | 6–3 / 6–4 | (Spain) Ivan Ramirez (Spain) Pablo García Rodrigo | |
| 3/3/2024 | (Spain) Javi Garrido (Spain) Miguel Yanguas | 6–3 / 6–2 | (Spain) Antonio Luque (Spain) Jose Luis Gonzalez | |
| 3/3/2024 | (Spain) Alejandro Arroyo (Spain) Eduardo Alonso | 6–2 / 7–6 | (Spain) Alonso Rodriguez Martinez (Spain) Javier Martinez Vazquez | |
| 3/3/2024 | (Argentina) Federico Mouriño (Spain) Victor Mena Gil | 6–0 / 6–1 | (Qatar) Jabor Al Mutawa (Qatar) Mohammed Al Khanji | |
| 3/3/2024 | (Argentina) Alex Chozas (Italy) Denis Perino | 6–2 / 1–6 / 6–2 | (Argentina) Ignacio Sager (Spain) Salvador Oria | |
| 3/3/2024 | (Argentina) Leandro Augsburger (Argentina) Valentino Libaak | 6–1 / 6–1 | (Qatar) Ali Al Saygh (Qatar) Rayan Abdulla | |
| 3/3/2024 | (Spain) Jose Jimenez Casas (Argentina) Miguel Lamperti | 5–7 / 6–3 / 6–2 | (Spain) Alvaro Cepero (Spain) Jose David Sanchez Serrano | |
| 3/3/2024 | (Spain) Gonzalo Rubio (Argentina) Maxi Sanchez | 6–1 / 6–2 | (Argentina) Cristian German Gutierrez (Spain) Jorge Ruiz Gutiérrez | |
| 3/3/2024 | (Spain) Diego Gil Batista (Spain) Jesus Moya | 0–6 / 7–6 / 6–3 | (Spain) Javi Leal (Spain) Jose García Diestro | |
| 3/3/2024 | (Spain) Carlos Marti (Spain) Miguel Solbes | 6–2 / 6–0 | (Qatar) Abdulaziz Saadon Alkuwari (Qatar) Amr Hassan | |
| 3/3/2024 | (Spain) Iñigo Jofre (Spain) Luis Hernandez Quesada | 7–5 / 6–4 | (Spain) Mario Del Castillo (Spain) Miguel Benítez | |
| 3/3/2024 | (Spain) Emiliano Iriart (Spain) Marcos Cordoba Lugo | 6–7 / 6–4 / 6–1 | (Spain) Adriá Mercadal (Spain) Ruben Rivera | |
| 3/3/2024 | (Spain) Javi Rico (Spain) Juanlu Esbri | 6–1 / 6–0 | (Qatar) Abdulla Alhijji (Qatar) Mohammed Saadon Alkuwari | |
| 3/3/2024 | (Spain) Javier Gonzalez Barahona (Spain) Javier García Mora | 5–7 / 6–3 / 6–1 | (Argentina) Agustin Gutiérrez (Brazil) Lucas Campagnolo | |
| 3/3/2024 | (Spain) Jairo Bautista (Spain) Jaime Muñoz | 3–6 / 6–3 / 6–4 | (Spain) Francisco Gil Morales (Argentina) Ramiro Moyano | |
| 3/3/2024 | (Spain) Javi Ruiz (Spain) Pablo Cardona | 6–3 / 6–1 | (Belgium) Clement Geens (Italy) Marco Cassetta | |
| 3/3/2024 | (Spain) Alvaro Melendez Amaya (Spain) Pedro Melendez Amaya | 4–6 / 6–4 / 6–4 | (Chile) Javier Valdes (Spain) Rafael Méndez | |
| 3/3/2024 | (Spain) Miguel Semmler (Spain) Pablo Lijó | 7–6 / 6–3 | (Spain) Carlos Perez Cabeza (Portugal) Miguel Deus | |
| 3/3/2024 | (Spain) Ignacio Vilariño (Spain) José Rico | 6–1 / 6–2 | (Argentina) Agustin Gomez Silingo (Portugal) Gustavo Nunes | |
| 3/3/2024 | (Spain) Coki Nieto (Spain) Jon Sanz | 6–3 / 6–2 | (Spain) Marc Quilez (Spain) Toni Bueno | |
| 3/3/2024 | (Argentina) Juan Cruz Belluati (Spain) Pincho Fernandez | 2–6 / 6–1 / 6–4 | (Spain) Raúl Marcos Duran (Spain) Sergio Alba | |
| 3/3/2024 | (Spain) Aitor Garcia Bassas (Spain) Mario Huete | 7–6 / 6–4 | (Spain) Alvaro Montiel (Sweden) Simon Vasquez | |
| 3/3/2024 | (Spain) Enrique Goenaga (Spain) Teodoro Zapata | 6–4 / 6–3 | (Argentina) Aris Patiniotis (Argentina) Facundo Dominguez | |

Women's

| Date | Winners | Score | Opponent | Refs. |
|---|---|---|---|---|
| 3/3/2024 | (Spain) Ariadna Cañellas (Spain) Teresa Navarro | 6–2 / 6–4 | (Spain) Amanda Lopez Moral (Spain) Carla Fitó | |
| 3/3/2024 | (Spain) Marta Barrera (Spain) Marta Caparrós | 4–6 / 6–1 / 7–6 | (Spain) Araceli Martinez (Spain) Sara Ruiz | |
| 3/3/2024 | (Spain) Ares Llobera Irun (Spain) Maite Cano Pou | 6–4 / 7–5 | (Spain) Aitana Garcia Roman (Argentina) Marianela Montesi | |
| 3/3/2024 | (Spain) Agueda Perez Ortiz (Spain) Patricia Martínez Fortun | 6–1 / 4–6 / 6–0 | (Spain) Carla Castillo (Spain) Lucia Peralta | |
| 3/3/2024 | (Spain) Esther Carnicero (Russia) Ksenia Sharifova | 7–5 / 3–6 / 6–2 | (Spain) Alba Perez Momha (Spain) Lucía García Trella | |
| 3/3/2024 | (Italy) Giorgia Marchetti (Spain) Sara Pujals | 6–2 / 6–4 | (Spain) Alicia Blanco Rojo (Spain) Monica Gomez Rivas | |
| 3/3/2024 | (Netherlands) Marcella Koek (Netherlands) Steffie Weterings | 6–3 / 7–6 | (Spain) Ana Fernandez de Osso (Spain) Raquel Segura Aguilar | |
| 3/3/2024 | (Spain) Carmen Castillon (Brazil) Raquel Piltcher | 6–3 / 6–1 | (Spain) Aida Martinez Sanjuan (Spain) Lucía Fernandez | |
| 3/3/2024 | (France) Alix Collombon (France) Jessica Ginier | 6–0 / 6–0 | (Spain) Carolina Gallo Fria (Oman) Fatma Al Nabhani | |
| 3/3/2024 | (Spain) Arantxa Soriano (Spain) Carla Mesa | 6–1 / 5–7 / 7–5 | (Spain) Letizia Manquillo (Spain) Noemi Aguilar | |
| 3/3/2024 | (Italy) Chiara Pappacena (Spain) Xenia Clasca | 6–4 / 6–1 | (Spain) Julia Polo Bautista (Portugal) Patricia Maria Ribeiro | |
| 3/3/2024 | (Italy) Lorena Vano (Brazil) Manuela Schuck | 7–5 / 4–6 / 6–3 | (Italy) Carolina Petrelli (Italy) Emily Stellato | |
| 3/3/2024 | (Spain) Jimena Velasco (Spain) Noa Canovas | 6–3 / 6–4 | (Spain) Laia Rodriguez Abajo (Spain) Sandra Bellver | |
| 3/3/2024 | (Spain) Melania Merino (Spain) Sofía Saiz | 6–2 / 6–1 | (Portugal) Catarina Santos Domingos (France) Elodie Invernon | |
| 3/3/2024 | (Italy) Carlotta Casali (Spain) Lara Arruabarrena | 6–1 / 3–6 / 7–6 | (Spain) Marta Arellano Navarro (Spain) Nuria Vivancos | |
| 3/3/2024 | (Spain) Marta Borrero (Spain) Martina Fassio | 6–2 / 6–1 | (Spain) Ana Varo Ramos (Spain) Lorena Alonso | |

=== Round of 32 ===
Men's

| Date | Winners | Score | Opponent | Refs. |
|---|---|---|---|---|
| 4/3/2024 | (Spain) Alejandro Galán; Juan Lebrón | 6–3 / 6–3 | (Sweden) Daniel Windahl (Spain) Jose Solano Marmolejo | |
| 4/3/2024 | (Spain) Javi Garrido (Spain) Miguel Yanguas | 6–7 / 6–0 / 6–3 | (Spain) Arnau Ayats (Spain) Francisco Guerrero | |
| 4/3/2024 | (Spain) Alejandro Arroyo (Spain) Eduardo Alonso | 6–3 / 7–5 | (Argentina) Federico Mouriño (Spain) Victor Mena Gil | |
| 4/3/2024 | (Spain) Alex Ruiz (Argentina) Juan Tello | 7–5 / 6–4 | (Argentina) Alex Chozas (Italy) Denis Perino | |
| 4/3/2024 | (Argentina) Federico Chingotto (Spain) Momo Gonzalez | 6–4 / 6–3 | (Argentina) Leandro Augsburger (Argentina) Valentino Libaak | |
| 4/3/2024 | (Spain) Gonzalo Rubio (Argentina) Maxi Sanchez | 7–6 / 6–4 | (Spain) Jose Jimenez Casas (Argentina) Miguel Lamperti | |
| 4/3/2024 | (Spain) Carlos Marti (Spain) Miguel Solbes | 3–6 / 6–4 / 6–4 | (Spain) Diego Gil Batista (Spain) Jesus Moya | |
| 4/3/2024 | (Argentina) Franco Stupaczuk (Argentina) Martin Di Nenno | 6–2 / 6–3 | (Spain) Iñigo Jofre (Spain) Luis Hernandez Quesada | |
| 4/3/2024 | (Spain) Paquito Navarro (Argentina) Sanyo Gutiérrez | 6–2 / 6–2 | (Spain) Emiliano Iriart (Spain) Marcos Cordoba Lugo | |
| 4/3/2024 | (Spain) Javi Rico (Spain) Juanlu Esbri | 2–6 / 7–6 / 6–1 | (Spain) Javier Gonzalez Barahona (Spain) Javier García Mora | |
| 4/3/2024 | (Spain) Javi Ruiz (Spain) Pablo Cardona | 6–2 / 3–6 / 6–4 | (Spain) Jairo Bautista (Spain) Jaime Muñoz | |
| 4/3/2024 | (Argentina) Fernando Belasteguín (Argentina) Lucho Capra | 7–6 / 6–3 | (Spain) Alvaro Melendez Amaya (Spain) Pedro Melendez Amaya | |
| 4/3/2024 | (Brazil) Lucas Bergamini (Spain) Víctor Ruiz | 6–2 / 6–2 | (Spain) Miguel Semmler (Spain) Pablo Lijó | |
| 4/3/2024 | (Spain) Coki Nieto (Spain) Jon Sanz | 6–2 / 6–2 | (Spain) Ignacio Vilariño (Spain) José Rico | |
| 4/3/2024 | (Argentina) Juan Cruz Belluati (Spain) Pincho Fernandez | 6–4 / 3–6 / 7–5 | (Spain) Aitor Garcia Bassas (Spain) Mario Huete | |
| 4/3/2024 | (Argentina) Agustín Tapia (Spain) Arturo Coello | W.O. | (Spain) Enrique Goenaga (Spain) Teodoro Zapata | |

Women's

| Date | Winners | Score | Opponent | Refs. |
|---|---|---|---|---|
| 4/3/2024 | (Spain) Ariana Sánchez (Spain) Paula Josemaria | 6–0 / 63 | (Spain) Ariadna Cañellas (Spain) Teresa Navarro | |
| 4/3/2024 | (Portugal) Ana Catarina Nogueira (Spain) Beatriz Caldera | 6–4 / 6–3 | (Spain) Marta Barrera (Spain) Marta Caparrós | |
| 4/3/2024 | (Spain) Alejandra Alonso (Spain) Andrea Ustero Prieto | 6–3 / 6–2 | (Spain) Ares Llobera Irun (Spain) Maite Cano Pou | |
| 4/3/2024 | (Argentina) Claudia Jensen (Spain) Jessica Castelló | 4–6 / 6–3 / 6–0 | (Spain) Agueda Perez Ortiz (Spain) Patricia Martínez Fortun | |
| 4/3/2024 | (Spain) Esther Carnicero (Russia) Ksenia Sharifova | 7–6 / 1–6 / 6–3 | (Portugal) Sofia Araújo (Argentina) Virginia Riera | |
| 4/3/2024 | (Italy) Carolina Orsi (Spain) Marina Martinez Lobo | 6–2 / 6–4 | (Italy) Giorgia Marchetti (Spain) Sara Pujals | |
| 4/3/2024 | (Spain) Marta Talavan (Spain) Nuria Rodriguez | 7–6 / 6–1 | (Netherlands) Marcella Koek (Netherlands) Steffie Weterings | |
| 4/3/2024 | (Spain) Marta Ortega (Spain) Verónica Virseda | 6–4 / 6–2 | (Spain) Carmen Castillon (Brazil) Raquel Piltcher | |
| 4/3/2024 | (Spain) Claudia Fernandez (Spain) Gemma Triay | 6–2 / 6–0 | (France) Alix Collombon (France) Jessica Ginier | |
| 4/3/2024 | (Spain) Lorena Rufo (Spain) Lucía Martínez | 6–0 / 6–2 | (Spain) Arantxa Soriano (Spain) Carla Mesa | |
| 4/3/2024 | (Spain) Lucia Sainz (Spain) Patty Llaguno | 6–3 / 6–2 | (Italy) Chiara Pappacena (Spain) Xenia Clasca | |
| 4/3/2024 | (Italy) Lorena Vano (Brazil) Manuela Schuck | 6–2 / 6–3 | (Spain) Barbara Las Heras (Spain) Victoria Iglesias | |
| 4/3/2024 | (Spain) Alejandra Salazar (Spain) Tamara Icardo | 3–6 / 6–4 / 6–1 | (Spain) Jimena Velasco (Spain) Noa Canovas | |
| 4/3/2024 | (Spain) Melania Merino (Spain) Sofía Saiz | 7–6 / 2–6 / 7–5 | (Sweden) Carolina Navarro (Spain) Marina Guinart | |
| 4/3/2024 | (Argentina) Aranzazu Osoro (Spain) Carmen Goenaga | 6–0 / 6–1 | (Italy) Carlotta Casali (Spain) Lara Arruabarrena | |
| 4/3/2024 | (Spain) Bea González (Argentina) Delfina Brea | 6–1 / 6–2 | (Spain) Marta Borrero (Spain) Martina Fassio | |

=== Round of 16 ===
Men's

| Date | Winners | Score | Opponent | Refs. |
|---|---|---|---|---|
| 5/3/2024 | (Spain) Javi Garrido (Spain) Miguel Yanguas | 6–7 / 7–6 / 6–4 | (Spain) Alejandro Galán; Juan Lebrón | |
| 5/3/2024 | (Spain) Alejandro Arroyo (Spain) Eduardo Alonso | 6–4 / 7–6 | (Spain) Alex Ruiz (Argentina) Juan Tello | |
| 5/3/2024 | (Argentina) Federico Chingotto (Spain) Momo Gonzalez | 6–2 / 6–0 | (Spain) Gonzalo Rubio (Argentina) Maxi Sanchez | |
| 5/3/2024 | (Argentina) Franco Stupaczuk (Argentina) Martin Di Nenno | 6–3 / 6–3 | (Spain) Carlos Marti (Spain) Miguel Solbes | |
| 5/3/2024 | (Spain) Paquito Navarro (Argentina) Sanyo Gutiérrez | 6–4 / 6–7 / 6–1 | (Spain) Javi Rico (Spain) Juanlu Esbri | |
| 5/3/2024 | (Spain) Javi Ruiz (Spain) Pablo Cardona | 6–1 / 6–4 | (Argentina) Fernando Belasteguín (Argentina) Lucho Capra | |
| 5/3/2024 | (Spain) Coki Nieto (Spain) Jon Sanz | 7–6 / 6–7 / 6–1 | (Brazil) Lucas Bergamini (Spain) Víctor Ruiz | |
| 5/3/2024 | (Argentina) Agustín Tapia (Spain) Arturo Coello | 6–2 / 6–4 | (Argentina) Juan Cruz Belluati (Spain) Pincho Fernandez | |

Women's

| Date | Winners | Score | Opponent | Refs. |
|---|---|---|---|---|
| 5/3/2024 | (Spain) Ariana Sánchez (Spain) Paula Josemaria | 7–6 / 6–0 | (Portugal) Ana Catarina Nogueira (Spain) Beatriz Caldera | |
| 5/3/2024 | (Argentina) Claudia Jensen (Spain) Jessica Castelló | 6–2 / 3–6 / 6–4 | (Spain) Alejandra Alonso (Spain) Andrea Ustero Prieto | |
| 5/3/2024 | (Spain) Esther Carnicero (Russia) Ksenia Sharifova | 6–3 / 7–6 | (Italy) Carolina Orsi (Spain) Marina Martinez Lobo | |
| 5/3/2024 | (Spain) Marta Ortega (Spain) Verónica Virseda | 7–5 / 6–3 | (Spain) Marta Talavan (Spain) Nuria Rodriguez | |
| 5/3/2024 | (Spain) Claudia Fernandez (Spain) Gemma Triay | 6–1 / 6–2 | (Spain) Lorena Rufo (Spain) Lucía Martínez | |
| 5/3/2024 | (Spain) Lucia Sainz (Spain) Patty Llaguno | 6–2 / 6–0 | (Italy) Lorena Vano (Brazil) Manuela Schuck | |
| 5/3/2024 | (Spain) Alejandra Salazar (Spain) Tamara Icardo | 6–2 / 6–1 | (Spain) Melania Merino (Spain) Sofía Saiz | |
| 5/3/2024 | (Spain) Bea González (Argentina) Delfina Brea | 6–4 / 6–1 | (Argentina) Aranzazu Osoro (Spain) Carmen Goenaga | |

=== Quarter-Finals ===
Men's

| Date | Winners | Score | Opponent | Refs. |
|---|---|---|---|---|
| 6/3/2024 | (Spain) Javi Garrido (Spain) Miguel Yanguas | 7–5 / 6–4 | (Spain) Alejandro Arroyo (Spain) Eduardo Alonso | |
| 6/3/2024 | (Argentina) Franco Stupaczuk (Argentina) Martin Di Nenno | 6–3 / 6–3 | (Argentina) Federico Chingotto (Spain) Momo Gonzalez | |
| 6/3/2024 | (Spain) Paquito Navarro (Argentina) Sanyo Gutiérrez | 6–4 / 6–4 | (Spain) Javi Ruiz (Spain) Pablo Cardona | |
| 6/3/2024 | (Argentina) Agustín Tapia (Spain) Arturo Coello | 6–2 / 6–2 | (Spain) Coki Nieto (Spain) Jon Sanz | |

Women's

| Date | Winners | Score | Opponent | Refs. |
|---|---|---|---|---|
| 6/3/2024 | (Spain) Ariana Sánchez (Spain) Paula Josemaria | 6–3 / 6–3 | (Argentina) Claudia Jensen (Spain) Jessica Castelló | |
| 6/3/2024 | (Spain) Marta Ortega (Spain) Verónica Virseda | 6–2 / 6–0 | (Spain) Esther Carnicero (Russia) Ksenia Sharifova | |
| 6/3/2024 | (Spain) Claudia Fernandez (Spain) Gemma Triay | 6–1 / 6–3 | (Spain) Lucia Sainz (Spain) Patty Llaguno | |
| 6/3/2024 | (Spain) Alejandra Salazar (Spain) Tamara Icardo | 2–6 / 7–5 / 6–1 | (Spain) Bea González (Argentina) Delfina Brea | |

=== Semi-Finals ===
Men's

| Date | Winners | Score | Opponent | Refs. |
|---|---|---|---|---|
| 7/3/2024 | (Spain) Javi Garrido (Spain) Miguel Yanguas | 6–2 / 7–6 | (Argentina) Franco Stupaczuk (Argentina) Martin Di Nenno | |
| 7/3/2024 | (Argentina) Agustín Tapia (Spain) Arturo Coello | 6–0 / 6–4 | (Spain) Paquito Navarro (Argentina) Sanyo Gutiérrez | |

Women's

| Date | Winners | Score | Opponent | Refs. |
|---|---|---|---|---|
| 7/3/2024 | (Spain) Ariana Sánchez (Spain) Paula Josemaria | 4–6 / 6–2 / 6–4 | (Spain) Marta Ortega (Spain) Verónica Virseda | |
| 7/3/2024 | (Spain) Claudia Fernandez (Spain) Gemma Triay | 7–5 / 6–4 | (Spain) Alejandra Salazar (Spain) Tamara Icardo | |

=== Finals ===
Men's

| Date | Winners | Score | Opponent | Refs. |
|---|---|---|---|---|
| 8/3/2024 | (Argentina) Agustín Tapia (Spain) Arturo Coello | 6–0 / 6–2 | (Spain) Javi Garrido (Spain) Miguel Yanguas | |

Women's

| Date | Winners | Score | Opponent | Refs. |
|---|---|---|---|---|
| 8/3/2024 | (Spain) Ariana Sánchez (Spain) Paula Josemaria | 6–3 / 6–1 | (Spain) Claudia Fernandez (Spain) Gemma Triay | |
