= 2024 Asunción P2 =

Padel championships

- Date: 11 May – 19 May
- Edition: 1st
- Category: P2
- Prize money: €250.000
- Location: Asunción, Paraguay
- Venue: Ueno SND Arena

Champions
- Men's doubles: (Argentina) Agustín Tapia (Spain) Arturo Coello
- Women's doubles: (Spain) Bea González (Argentina) Delfina Brea

Chronology

The 2024 Asunción P2 (officially 2024 Asunción Premier Padel P2) was the seventh tournament of the third season organized by Premier Padel, promoted by the International Padel Federation, and with the financial backing of Nasser Al-Khelaïfi's Qatar Sports Investments, now serving as the premier padel circuit.

In the women's division, the second and third seeded pairs faced each other in the final for the third time in 2024, with Bea Gonzalez and Delfina Brea claiming their fourth consecutive title after defeating Claudia Fernández and Gemma Triay.

In the men's division, Alejandro Galán and Federico Chingotto would reach their fourth consecutive final to face the No. 1 FIP ranked team, Agustín Tapia and Arturo Coello, with the latter winning their fourth title of the season.

== Seeds ==
Male

| Rnk. | Team | FIP Ranking Points |
|---|---|---|
| 1 | (Argentina) Agustín Tapia (Spain) Arturo Coello | 23826 |
| 2 | (Spain) Alejandro Galán (Argentina) Federico Chingotto | 18731 |
| 3 | (Spain) Juan Lebrón (Spain) Paquito Navarro | 17905 |
| 4 | (Argentina) Franco Stupaczuk (Argentina) Martin Di Nenno | 17500 |
| 5 | (Argentina) Fernando Belasteguín (Argentina) Juan Tello | 8918 |
| 6 | (Spain) Javi Garrido (Argentina) Miguel Yanguas | 7540 |
| 7 | (Argentina) Aléx Ruiz (Spain) Momo Gonzalez | 6760 |
| 8 | (Argentina) Maxi Sanchéz (Argentina) Sanyo Gutiérrez | 6549 |
| 9 | (Brazil) Lucas Bergamini (Spain) Victor Ruiz | 4935 |
| 10 | (Spain) Alejandro Arroyo (Spain) Eduardo Alonso | 3597 |
| 11 | (Spain) Francisco Gil Morales (Argentina) Ramiro Moyano | 3262 |
| 12 | (Argentina) Alex Chozas (Argentina) Lucho Capra | 3145 |
| 13 | (Spain) Javier Leal (Brazil) Lucas Campagnolo | 2841 |
| 14 | (Spain) Javi Ruiz (Spain) Pablo Cardona | 2676 |
| 15 | (Spain) Gonzalo Rubio (Spain) Jairo Bautista | 2648 |
| 16 | (Argentina) Agustin Gutierrez (Spain) Jose Rico | 2392 |

Female

| Rnk. | Team | FIP Ranking Points |
|---|---|---|
| 1 | (Spain) Ariana Sánchez (Spain) Paula Josemaria | 24644 |
| 2 | (Spain) Beatriz Gonzalez (Argentina) Delfina Brea | 18420 |
| 3 | (Spain) Claudia Fernandez (Spain) Gemma Triay | 12118 |
| 4 | (Spain) Alejandra Salazar (Spain) Tamara Icardo | 10650 |
| 5 | (Spain) Marta Ortega (Spain) Veronica Virseda | 10189 |
| 6 | (Argentina) Claudia Jensen (Spain) Jessica Castello | 9167 |
| 7 | (Portugal) Sofia Araújo (Argentina) Virginia Riera | 8585 |
| 8 | (Argentina) Lucia Sainz (Spain) Patty Llaguno | 5679 |
| 9 | (Argentina) Aranzazu Osoro (Spain) Carmen Goenaga | 5002 |
| 10 | (Spain) Beatriz Caldera (Spain) Lorena Rufo | 2719 |
| 11 | (Portugal) Ana Catarina Nogueira (Spain) Marta Talavan | 2698 |
| 12 | (France) Alix Collombon (Argentina) Julieta Bidahorria | 2656 |
| 13 | (Russia) Ksenia Sharifova (Spain) Lucia Martinez | 2364 |
| 14 | (Spain) Esther Carnicero (Spain) Marina Lobo | 2198 |
| 15 | (Spain) Maria Eulalia Rodriguez Abajo (Spain) Nuria Rodriguez Camacho | 2157 |
| 16 | (Spain) Araceli Martinez (Spain) Marina Guinart | 2155 |

== Head-to-head record between teams ranked in the top 4 during the season ==
=== Man's ===
| Event | Coello–Tapia | Galán–Chingotto | Lebrón–Paquito | Di Nenno–Stupaczuk | Former Pairs | Galán–Lebrón | Paquito–Sanyo |
| Coello–Tapia | — | 2–2 | 1–0 | — | | 1–1 | 2–0 |
| Galán–Chingotto | 2–2 | — | — | 3–0 | | — | — |
| Lebrón–Paquito | 0–1 | — | — | 0–1 | | — | — |
| Di Nenno–Stupaczuk | — | 0–3 | 1–0 | — | | 0–2 | — |
| Former Pairs | | | | | | | |
| Galán–Lebrón | 1–1 | — | — | 2–0 | | — | — |
| Paquito–Sanyo | 0–2 | — | — | — | | — | — |

=== Women's ===
| Event | Ariana–Paula | Gonzalez–D. Brea | Fernandez–Triay | Icardo–Salazar | Former Pairs | Ortega–Triay | Ortega–Virseda |
| Ariana–Paula | — | 1–1 | 2–2 | 1–0 | | — | 1–0 |
| B. Gonzalez–D. Brea | 1–1 | — | 2–0 | 3–0 | | — | — |
| Fernandez–Triay | 2–2 | 0–2 | — | 0–1 | | — | — |
| Icardo–Salazar | 0–1 | 0–3 | 1–0 | — | | — | — |
| Former Pairs | | | | | | | |
| Ortega–Triay | — | — | — | — | | — | — |
| Ortega–Virseda | 0–1 | — | — | — | | — | — |

== Draws ==
=== Men's Bracket ===
Round of 32
1 | (Spain) Coello / (Argentina) Tapia | 6 | 6
9 | (Brazil) L. Bergamini / (Spain) V. Ruiz | 1 | 3
11 | (Spain) F. Gil / (Argentina) R. Moyano | 6 | 1 | 6
12 | (Argentina) A. Chozas / (Argentina) L. Capra | 2 | 6 | 7
Q | (Argentina) L. Augsburger / (Argentina) V. Libaak | 6 | 6
19 | (Spain) I. Sager / (Spain) S. Oria | 3 | 2
26 | (Argentina) C.G. Gutiérrez / (Spain) J. Ruiz | 2 | 2
6 | (Spain) J. Garrido / (Spain) Yanguas | 6 | 6
5 | (Argentina) Belasteguin / (Argentina) J. Tello | 6 | 6
WC | (Argentina) D. Cuello / (Argentina) R. Valenzuela | 3 | 4
Q | (Spain) I. Jofre / (Spain) L.H Quesada | 7 | 3 | 4
18 | (Spain) E. Goenaga / (Spain) J. Esbri | 6 | 6 | 6
16 | (Argentina) A. Gutierrez / (Spain) J. Rico | 6 | 6
WC | (Paraguay) F. Dehnike / (Italy) T. Gamondi | 4 | 2
25 | (Spain) I. Ramirez / (Spain) J.J. Casas | 0 | 0
3 | (Spain) Lebrón / (Spain) Paquito | 6 | 6
4 | (Argentina) F. Stupaczuk / (Argentina) Di Nenno | 6 | 6
17 | (Argentina) J.C. Belluati / (Argentina) M. Lamperti | 2 | 4
20 | (Spain) J.G. Diestro / (Spain) P. Lijó | 6 | 7
21 | (Spain) J. Garcia / (Spain) J. Munoz | 4 | 5
13 | (Spain) J. Leal / (Brazil) L. Campagnolo | 6 | 4 | 6
Q | (Spain) Á. Amaya / (Spain) P. Amaya | 2 | 6 | 4
14 | (Spain) J. Ruiz / (Spain) P. Cardona | 3 | 6 | 6
8 | (Argentina) Maxi / (Argentina) Sanyo | 6 | 3 | 4
7 | (Spain) A. Ruiz / (Spain) Momo | 6 | 6
15 | (Spain) G. Rubio / (Spain) J. Bautista | 3 | 4
Q | (Sweden) D. Windahl / (Chile) J. Valdes | 6 | 6
24 | (Spain) A. Ayats / (Spain) F. Guerrero | 3 | 4
10 | (Spain) A. Arroyo / (Spain) E. Alonso | 6 | 6
22 | (Spain) J. Barahona / (Spain) T. Zapata | 2 | 2
23 | (Spain) J. Martinez / (Spain) P. Fernandez | 2 | 0
2 | (Spain) Galán / (Argentina) F. Chingotto | 6 | 6

Round of 16
1 | (Spain) Coello / (Argentina) Tapia | 6 | 6
12 | (Argentina) A. Chozas / (Argentina) L. Capra | 0 | 3
Q | (Argentina) L. Augsburger / (Argentina) V. Libaak | 6 | 4 | 4
6 | (Spain) J. Garrido / (Spain) Yanguas | 4 | 6 | 6
5 | (Argentina) Belasteguin / (Argentina) J. Tello | 2 | 6 | 6
18 | (Spain) E. Goenaga / (Spain) J. Esbri | 6 | 2 | 3
16 | (Argentina) A. Gutierrez / (Spain) J. Rico | 7 | 1 | 2
3 | (Spain) Lebrón / (Spain) Paquito | 6 | 6 | 6
4 | (Argentina) F. Stupaczuk / (Argentina) Di Nenno | 6 | 6
20 | (Spain) J.G. Diestro / (Spain) P. Lijó | 1 | 1
13 | (Spain) J. Leal / (Brazil) L. Campagnolo | 6 | 7
14 | (Spain) J. Ruiz / (Spain) P. Cardona | 3 | 6
7 | (Spain) A. Ruiz / (Spain) Momo | 7 | 6
Q | (Sweden) D. Windahl / (Chile) J. Valdes | 6 | 3
10 | (Spain) A. Arroyo / (Spain) E. Alonso | 3 | 2
2 | (Spain) Galán / (Argentina) F. Chingotto | 6 | 6

Quarter-Final
1 | (Spain) Coello / (Argentina) Tapia | 6 | 6
6 | (Spain) J. Garrido / (Spain) Yanguas | 4 | 4
5 | (Argentina) Belasteguin / (Argentina) J. Tello | 4 | 2
3 | (Spain) Lebrón / (Spain) Paquito | 6 | 6
4 | (Argentina) F. Stupaczuk / (Argentina) Di Nenno | 6 | 6
13 | (Spain) J. Leal / (Brazil) L. Campagnolo | 4 | 3
7 | (Spain) A. Ruiz / (Spain) Momo | 4 | 2
2 | (Spain) Galán / (Argentina) F. Chingotto | 6 | 6

Semi-Finals
1 | (Spain) Coello / (Argentina) Tapia | 2 | 6 | 7
3 | (Spain) Lebrón / (Spain) Paquito | 6 | 0 | 5
4 | (Argentina) F. Stupaczuk / (Argentina) Di Nenno | 6 | 2 | 2
2 | (Spain) Galán / (Argentina) F. Chingotto | 3 | 6 | 6

Finals
1 | (Spain) Coello / (Argentina) Tapia | 6 | 3 | 7
2 | (Spain) Galán / (Argentina) F. Chingotto | 1 | 6 | 6

=== Women's Bracket ===
Round of 32
1 | (Spain) A. Sanchez / (Spain) P. Josemaria
Bye
10 | (Spain) B. Caldera / (Spain) L. Rufo | 6 | 3 | 2
17 | (Spain) J. Velasco / (Spain) N. Canovas | 3 | 6 | 5
Q | (Spain) M. Navarro / (Portugal) P. Ribeiro | 3 | 6 | 4
11 | (Portugal) A. Nogueira / (Spain) M. Talavan | 6 | 4 | 6
16 | (Spain) A. Martinez / (Spain) M. Guinart | 6 | 7 | 7
9 | (Argentina) A. Osoro / (Spain) C. Goenaga | 7 | 5 | 6
8 | (Spain) L. Sainz / (Spain) P. Llaguno | 5 | *
14 | (Spain) E. Carnicero / (Spain) M. Lobo | 0
18 | (Italy) C. Orsi / (Spain) M. Goyenche | 6 | 6
WC | (Argentina) M. Ferreyra / (Argentina) S. Campus | 2 | 2
Q | (Spain) C. Castillon / (Brazil) R. Piltcher | 3 | 4
Q | (Brazil) M. Schuck / (Spain) M. Rivas | 6 | 6
Bye
3 | (Spain) C. Fernandez / (Spain) G. Triay
5 | (Spain) M. Ortega / (Spain) V. Virseda
Bye
22 | (Spain) A. Soriano / (Italy) C. Casali | 6 | 6
LL | (Spain) C. Velarde / (Netherlands) M. Koek | 4 | 3
12 | (France) A. Collombon / (Argentina) J. Bidahorria | 4 | 4
20 | (Spain) A. Cañellas / (Spain) T. Navarro | 6 | 6
19 | (Spain) M. Barrera / (Spain) M. Caparros | 7 | 3 | 1
6 | (Argentina) C. Jensen / (Spain) J. Castello | 6 | 6 | 6
7 | (Portugal) S. Araújo / (Argentina) V. Riera | 6 | 6
21 | (Spain) A. Perez / (Spain) P. Martinez | 1 | 1
Q | (Spain) A. Gasco / (Spain) A. Salvado | 0 | 6 | 6
23 | (Spain) M. Borrero / (Spain) S. Bellver | 6 | 3 | 4
13 | (Russia) K. Sharifova / (Spain) L. Martinez | 2 | 6 | 6
15 | (Spain) M.R. Abajo / (Spain) N. Rodriguez | 6 | 4 | 4
Bye
2 | (Spain) B. González / (Argentina) D. Brea

Round of 16
1 | (Spain) A. Sanchez / (Spain) P. Josemaria | 6 | 6
17 | (Spain) J. Velasco / (Spain) N. Canovas | 3 | 0
11 | (Portugal) A. Nogueira / (Spain) M. Talavan
16 | (Spain) A. Martinez / (Spain) M. Guinart | *
8 | (Spain) L. Sainz / (Spain) P. Llaguno | 6 | 6 | 6
18 | (Italy) C. Orsi / (Spain) M. Goyenche | 1 | 7 | 3
Q | (Brazil) M. Schuck / (Spain) M. Rivas | 1 | 2
3 | (Spain) C. Fernandez / (Spain) G. Triay | 6 | 6
5 | (Spain) M. Ortega / (Spain) V. Virseda | 6 | 6
22 | (Spain) A. Soriano / (Italy) C. Casali | 2 | 4
20 | (Spain) A. Cañellas / (Spain) T. Navarro | 3 | 1
6 | (Argentina) C. Jensen / (Spain) J. Castello | 6 | 6
7 | (Portugal) S. Araújo / (Argentina) V. Riera | 6 | 6
Q | (Spain) A. Gasco / (Spain) A. Salvado | 2 | 1
13 | (Russia) K. Sharifova / (Spain) L. Martinez | 1 | 4
2 | (Spain) B. González / (Argentina) D. Brea | 6 | 6

Quarter-Final
1 | (Spain) A. Sanchez / (Spain) P. Josemaria | 6 | 6
16 | (Spain) A. Martinez / (Spain) M. Guinart | 3 | 4
8 | (Spain) L. Sainz / (Spain) P. Llaguno | 6 | 4
3 | (Spain) C. Fernandez / (Spain) G. Triay | 7 | 6
5 | (Spain) M. Ortega / (Spain) V. Virseda | 6 | 7
6 | (Argentina) C. Jensen / (Spain) J. Castello | 4 | 5
7 | (Portugal) S. Araújo / (Argentina) V. Riera | 1 | 6 | 6
2 | (Spain) B. González / (Argentina) D. Brea | 6 | 1 | 7

Semi-Finals
1 | (Spain) A. Sanchez / (Spain) P. Josemaria | 5 | 6 | 4
3 | (Spain) C. Fernandez / (Spain) G. Triay | 7 | 4 | 6
5 | (Spain) M. Ortega / (Spain) V. Virseda | 2 | 5
2 | (Spain) B. González / (Argentina) D. Brea | 6 | 7

Finals
3 | (Spain) C. Fernandez / (Spain) G. Triay | 3 | 5
2 | (Spain) B. González / (Argentina) D. Brea | 6 | 7

== Results ==
=== Round of 32 ===
Men's

| Date | Winners | Score | Opponent | Refs. |
|---|---|---|---|---|
| 15/5/2024 | (Argentina) Agustín Tapia (Spain) Arturo Coello | 6–1 / 6–3 | (Brazil) Lucas Bergamini (Spain) Víctor Ruiz | |
| 15/5/2024 | (Argentina) Alex Chozas (Argentina) Lucho Capra | 2–6 / 6–1 / 7–6 | (Spain) Francisco Gil Morales (Argentina) Ramiro Moyano | |
| 15/5/2024 | (Argentina) Leandro Augsburger (Argentina) Valentino Libaak | 6–3 / 6–2 | (Spain) Ignacio Sager (Spain) Salvador Oria | |
| 15/5/2024 | (Spain) Javier Garridoz (Spain) Mike Yanguas | 6–2 / 6–2 | (Argentina) Cristian German Gutiérrez (Spain) Jorge Ruiz Gutiérrez | |
| 14/5/2024 | (Argentina) Fernando Belasteguín (Argentina) Juan Tello | 6–3 / 6–4 | (Argentina) Dylan Cuello (Argentina) Ramiro Valenzuela | |
| 14/5/2024 | (Spain) Enrique Goenaga (Spain) Juanlu Esbri | 6–7 / 6–3 / 6–4 | (Spain) Iñigo Jofre (Spain) Luis Hernandez Quesada | |
| 14/5/2024 | (Argentina) Agustin Gutiérrez (Spain) José Rico | 6–4 / 6–2 | (Paraguay) Facundo Dehnnike (Italy) Teo Gamondi | |
| 14/5/2024 | (Spain) Juan Lebrón (Spain) Paquito Navarro | 6–0 / 6–0 | (Spain) Ivan Ramirez (Spain) Jose Jimenez Casas | |
| 15/5/2024 | (Argentina) Franco Stupaczuk (Argentina) Martin Di Nenno | 6–2 / 6–4 | (Spain) Juan Cruz Belluati (Argentina) Miguel Lamperti | |
| 15/5/2024 | (Spain) Jose García Diestro (Spain) Pablo Lijó | 6–4 / 7–5 | (Spain) Javier García Mora (Spain) Jaime Muñoz | |
| 15/5/2024 | (Spain) Javi Leal (Brazil) Lucas Campagnolo | 6–2 / 4–6 / 6–4 | (Spain) Alvaro Melendez Amaya (Spain) Pedro Melendez Amaya | |
| 15/5/2024 | (Spain) Javi Ruiz (Spain) Pablo Cardona | 3–6 / 6–3 / 6–4 | (Argentina) Maxi Sánchez (Argentina) Sanyo Gutiérrez | |
| 14/5/2024 | (Spain) Alex Ruiz (Spain) Momo Gonzalez | 6–3 / 6–4 | (Spain) Gonzalo Rubio (Spain) Jairo Bautista | |
| 14/5/2024 | (Sweden) Daniel Windahl (Chile) Javier Valdes | 6–3 / 6–4 | (Spain) Arnau Ayats (Spain) Francisco Guerrero | |
| 14/5/2024 | (Spain) Alejandro Arroyo (Spain) Eduardo Alonso | 6–2 / 6–2 | (Spain) Javier Gonzalez Barahona (Spain) Teodoro Zapata | |
| 14/5/2024 | (Spain) Alejandro Galán (Argentina) Federico Chingotto | 6–2 / 6–0 | (Spain) Javier Martinez Vazquez (Spain) Pincho Fernandez | |

Women's

| Date | Winners | Score | Opponent | Refs. |
|---|---|---|---|---|
| 15/5/2024 | (Spain) Noa Canovas (Spain) Jimena Velasco | 3–6 / 6–3 / 5–2 / W.O. | (Spain) Beatriz Caldera (Spain) Lorena Rufo | |
| 15/5/2024 | (Portugal) Ana Catarina Nogueira (Spain) Marta Talavan | 6–3 / 4–6 / 6–4 | (Spain) Marta Arellano Navarro (Portugal) Patricia Ribeiro | |
| 15/5/2024 | (Spain) Araceli Martinez (Spain) Marina Guinart | 6–7 / 7–5 / 7–6 | (Argentina) Aranzazu Osoro (Spain) Carmen Goenaga | |
| 14/5/2024 | (Spain) Lucia Sainz (Spain) Patty Llaguno | 5–0 / W.O. | (Spain) Esther Carnicero (Spain) Marina Martinez Lobo | |
| 14/5/2024 | (Italy) Carolina Orsi (Spain) Martina Fassio | 6–2 / 6–2 | (Argentina) María Laura Ferreyra (Argentina) Silvana Campus | |
| 14/5/2024 | (Brazil) Manuela Schuck (Spain) Mónica Gomez Rivas | 6–3 / 6–4 | (Spain) Carmen Castillon (Brazil) Raquel Piltcher | |
| 14/5/2024 | (Spain) Arantxa Soriano Perez (Italy) Carlotta Casali | 6–4 / 6–3 | (Spain) Carla Castillo (Netherlands) Marcella Koek | |
| 14/5/2024 | (Spain) Ariadna Cañellas (Spain) Teresa Navarro | 6–4 / 6–4 | (France) Alix Collombon (Argentina) Julieta Bidahorria | |
| 14/5/2024 | (Argentina) Claudia Jensen (Spain) Jessica Castelló | 6–7 / 6–3 / 6–1 | (Spain) Marta Barrera (Spain) Marta Caparrós | |
| 15/5/2024 | (Portugal) Sofia Araújo (Argentina) Virginia Riera | 6–1 / 6–1 | (Spain) Agueda Perez Ortiz (Spain) Patricia Martínez Fortun | |
| 15/5/2024 | (Spain) Alba Gallardo Salvado (Spain) Anna Ortiz Gasco | 0–6 / 6–3 / 6–4 | (Spain) Marta Borrero (Spain) Sandra Bellver | |
| 15/5/2024 | (Russia) Ksenia Sharifova (Spain) Lucía Martínez | 2–6 / 6–4 / 6–4 | (Spain) Laia Rodriguez Abajo (Spain) Nuria Rodriguez | |

=== Round of 16 ===
Men's

| Date | Winners | Score | Opponent | Refs. |
|---|---|---|---|---|
| 16/5/2024 | (Argentina) Agustín Tapia (Spain) Arturo Coello | 6–0 / 6–3 | (Argentina) Alex Chozas (Argentina) Lucho Capra | |
| 16/5/2024 | (Spain) Javier Garridoz (Spain) Mike Yanguas | 4–6 / 6–4 / 6–4 | (Argentina) Leandro Augsburger (Argentina) Valentino Libaak | |
| 16/5/2024 | (Argentina) Fernando Belasteguín (Argentina) Juan Tello | 2–6 / 6–2 / 6–3 | (Spain) Enrique Goenaga (Spain) Juanlu Esbri | |
| 16/5/2024 | (Spain) Juan Lebrón (Spain) Paquito Navarro | 6–7 / 6–1 / 6–2 | (Argentina) Agustin Gutiérrez (Spain) José Rico | |
| 16/5/2024 | (Argentina) Franco Stupaczuk (Argentina) Martin Di Nenno | 6–1 / 6–1 | (Spain) Jose García Diestro (Spain) Pablo Lijó | |
| 16/5/2024 | (Spain) Javi Leal (Brazil) Lucas Campagnolo | 6–3 / 7–6 | (Spain) Javi Ruiz (Spain) Pablo Cardona | |
| 16/5/2024 | (Spain) Alex Ruiz (Spain) Momo Gonzalez | 7–6 / 6–3 | (Sweden) Daniel Windahl (Chile) Javier Valdes | |
| 16/5/2024 | (Spain) Alejandro Galán (Argentina) Federico Chingotto | 6–3 / 6–2 | (Spain) Alejandro Arroyo (Spain) Eduardo Alonso | |

Women's

| Date | Winners | Score | Opponent | Refs. |
|---|---|---|---|---|
| 16/5/2024 | (Spain) Ariana Sánchez (Spain) Paula Josemaria | 6–3 / 6–0 | (Spain) Noa Canovas (Spain) Jimena Velasco | |
| 16/5/2024 | (Spain) Araceli Martinez (Spain) Marina Guinart | W.O. | (Portugal) Ana Catarina Nogueira (Spain) Marta Talavan | |
| 16/5/2024 | (Spain) Lucia Sainz (Spain) Patty Llaguno | 6–1 / 6–7 / 6–3 | (Italy) Carolina Orsi (Spain) Martina Fassio | |
| 16/5/2024 | (Spain) Claudia Fernandez (Spain) Gemma Triay | 6–1 / 6–2 | (Brazil) Manuela Schuck (Spain) Mónica Gomez Rivas | |
| 16/5/2024 | (Spain) Marta Ortega (Spain) Verónica Virseda | 6–2 / 6–4 | (Spain) Arantxa Soriano Perez (Italy) Carlotta Casali | |
| 16/5/2024 | (Argentina) Claudia Jensen (Spain) Jessica Castelló | 6–3 / 6–1 | (Spain) Ariadna Cañellas (Spain) Teresa Navarro | |
| 16/5/2024 | (Portugal) Sofia Araújo (Argentina) Virginia Riera | 6–2 / 6–1 | (Spain) Alba Gallardo Salvado (Spain) Anna Ortiz Gasco | |
| 16/5/2024 | (Spain) Bea González (Argentina) Delfina Brea | 6–1 / 6–4 | (Russia) Ksenia Sharifova (Spain) Lucía Martínez | |

=== Quarter-Finals ===
Men's

| Date | Winners | Score | Opponent | Refs. |
|---|---|---|---|---|
| 17/5/2024 | (Argentina) Agustín Tapia (Spain) Arturo Coello | 6–4 / 6–4 | (Spain) Javier Garridoz (Spain) Mike Yanguas | |
| 17/5/2024 | (Spain) Juan Lebrón (Spain) Paquito Navarro | 6–4 / 6–2 | (Argentina) Fernando Belasteguín (Argentina) Juan Tello | |
| 17/5/2024 | (Argentina) Franco Stupaczuk (Argentina) Martin Di Nenno | 6–4 / 6–3 | (Spain) Javi Leal (Brazil) Lucas Campagnolo | |
| 17/5/2024 | (Spain) Alejandro Galán (Argentina) Federico Chingotto | 6–4 / 6–2 | (Spain) Alex Ruiz (Spain) Momo Gonzalez | |

Women's

| Date | Winners | Score | Opponent | Refs. |
|---|---|---|---|---|
| 17/5/2024 | (Spain) Ariana Sánchez (Spain) Paula Josemaria | 6–3 / 6–4 | (Spain) Araceli Martinez (Spain) Marina Guinart | |
| 17/5/2024 | (Spain) Claudia Fernandez (Spain) Gemma Triay | 7–6 / 6–4 | (Spain) Lucia Sainz (Spain) Patty Llaguno | |
| 17/5/2024 | (Spain) Marta Ortega (Spain) Verónica Virseda | 6–4 / 7–5 | (Argentina) Claudia Jensen (Spain) Jessica Castelló | |
| 17/5/2024 | (Spain) Bea González (Argentina) Delfina Brea | 6–1 / 1–6 / 7–6 | (Portugal) Sofia Araújo (Argentina) Virginia Riera | |

=== Semi-Finals ===
Men's

| Date | Winners | Score | Opponent | Refs. |
|---|---|---|---|---|
| 18/5/2024 | (Argentina) Agustín Tapia (Spain) Arturo Coello | 2–6 / 6–0 / 7–5 | (Spain) Juan Lebrón (Spain) Paquito Navarro | |
| 18/5/2024 | (Spain) Alejandro Galán (Argentina) Federico Chingotto | 3–6 / 6–2 / 6–2 | (Argentina) Franco Stupaczuk (Argentina) Martin Di Nenno | |

Women's

| Date | Winners | Score | Opponent | Refs. |
|---|---|---|---|---|
| 18/5/2024 | (Spain) Claudia Fernandez (Spain) Gemma Triay | 7–5 / 4–6 / 6–4 | (Spain) Ariana Sánchez (Spain) Paula Josemaria | |
| 18/5/2024 | (Spain) Bea González (Argentina) Delfina Brea | 6–2 / 7–5 | (Spain) Marta Ortega (Spain) Verónica Virseda | |

=== Finals ===
Men's

| Date | Winners | Score | Opponent | Refs. |
|---|---|---|---|---|
| 19/5/2024 | (Argentina) Agustín Tapia (Spain) Arturo Coello | 6–1 / 3–6 / 7–6 | (Spain) Alejandro Galán (Argentina) Federico Chingotto | |

Women's

| Date | Winners | Score | Opponent | Refs. |
|---|---|---|---|---|
| 19/5/2024 | (Spain) Bea González (Argentina) Delfina Brea | 6–3 / 7–5 | (Spain) Claudia Fernandez (Spain) Gemma Triay | |
