= Premier Padel 2024 =

Details
- Duration: 24 February – 22 December
- Edition: 3rd
- Tournaments: 24
- Categories: Major (4); P1 (10); P2 (9); Tour Finals (1)

Achievements (singles)
- Most titles: Men (Argentina) Agustín Tapia (Spain) Arturo Coello; Women (Spain) Ariana Sánchez (Spain) Paula Josemaría
- Most finals: Men (Argentina) Agustín Tapia (Spain) Arturo Coello; Women (shared) (Spain) Ariana Sánchez (Spain) Paula Josemaría (Spain) Claudia Fernández (Spain) Gemma Triay

The Premier Padel 2024 season was the third edition of the Premier Padel professional padel circuit. It marked the first season in which Premier Padel functioned as the sport's main global circuit, following the acquisition of the World Padel Tour (WPT) by Qatar Sports Investments (QSI), the organization that finances Premier Padel. As a result of the acquisition, the World Padel Tour ceased operations after eleven seasons.

The season was held throughout 2024 and consisted of 24 tournaments staged across 16 countries. Following the integration of the WPT into Premier Padel, the rankings were merged and restructured. Although Agustín Tapia and Arturo Coello finished the 2023 season as the top-ranked pair in the final WPT standings, Alejandro Galán and Juan Lebrón began the 2024 season as the world's No. 1 pair under the new Premier Padel ranking system.

In the men's division Tapia and Coello finished as the top-ranked pair for the second consecutive season, having the most tournament wins and final appearances in the circuit.

While in the women's division the year concluded with Ariana Sánchez and Paula Josemaría ranked first for the second consecutive season, also with the most tournaments won.

== Season summary ==
=== Partner and ranking changes ===
In the women's category, the three pairs that finished 2023 with the highest rankings remained together for 2024. Due to the conflict between the WPT and Premier Padel/FIP, which led FIP to disregard World Padel Tour tournaments held in 2023 for ranking purposes, the ranking restructuring resulted in Bea González and Delfina Brea (who had finished 2023 as the number 3 pair) starting the new season as the number 2 pair, while the reverse occurred for Gemma Triay and Marta Ortega, who began as the number 3 pair. Closing the top four, Alejandra Salazar and Sofia Araújo parted ways, with Salazar and Tamara Icardo becoming the new fourth-ranked pair.

In the men's category, the top three ranked pairs also chose to stay together for 2024. However, as in the women's category, the exclusion of points earned in WPT tournaments led to changes in the rankings. Despite speculation about a split between Alejandro Galán and Juan Lebrón, the Spaniards, who had finished the 2023 as the No. 3 pair, opted to start the season together and, due to the ranking changes, claimed the number one spot, while Arturo Coello and Agustín Tapia, who had finished as world number ones, took second place. Rounding out the top four, Paquito Navarro and Sanyo Gutiérrez, who challenged for the number one ranking in 2016 and 2017, joined forces for a second stint as a pair.

=== First tournaments of the season ===
==== March ====
In both the men's and women's divisions, the top-ranked pairs continued their strong form from the end of the previous year and won the season's first tournament by defeating the number-two seeds.

The season's first changes would come in the subsequent tournaments. After Riyadh, Gemma Triay and Marta Ortega parted ways, with Gemma teaming up with Cláudia Fernandéz and Ortega joining forces with Veronica Virseda. Meanwhile, Galán and Lebrón would split up following a controversial match in which they were eliminated by Javi Garrido and Mike Yanguas, who went on to make a surprise run to the Qatar Major final. Galán chose Federico Chingotto as his new partner, while Lebrón reunited with Paquito Navarro, with whom he had held the world number one spot in 2019.

Meanwhile, Coello and Tapia would go on to win the season's second and third tournaments, the latter against Galán and Lebrón in the final, during their "Last Dance." As for Ariana and Paula, they won the second tournament, but having sat out the third one, they saw Claudia Jensen and Jessica Castelló take the title in Acapulco.

==== April–May ====
The next four tournaments were dominated by Bea and Delfina, who won all four, defeating the world number ones in Seville and the number threes in Brussels and Asunción. In the men's division, Coello and Tapia missed out on a final for the only time that season (in tournaments they entered) when they were eliminated in the semifinals by Galán and Chingotto, who went on to win the Seville P2. The matchup would be repetead in Puerto Cabello, Brussels, and Asunción, with the world number ones winning the first and last of these, while "ChinGalán" won in Brussels.

The same matchup would be repeated in Mar del Plata and Santiago de Chile, with the number twos winning in Argentina and the number ones winning in Chile. In the women's division, Ariana and Paula returned to winning ways at the Mar del Plata P1, preventing Bea and Delfina from achieving a fifth consecutive title, while Claudia Fernández and Gemma Triay won their first title as a pair in Santiago. With the victory, Claudia became the youngest player ever to win a professional padel tournament, at 18 years, 3 months and 4 days.

==== June–July ====
In the season's tenth tournament, the top four men's pairs— Coello/Tapia, Chingotto/Galán, Lebrón/Paquito, and Di Nenno/Stupaczuk— opted not to participate, while three of the top four women's pairs —Josemaria/Sánchez, Brea/Gonzalez, and Salazar/Icardo— did the same. Consequently, the ninth-ranked duo of Coki Nieto and Jon Sanz became the first pair outside the top two to win a title, while Claudia and Gemma claimed their second consecutive tournament victory.

In the remaining tournaments of the first half of the season, there were no surprises on the men's side with the "Super Clásico" being played in Rome, Genoa, and Málaga. Chingotto and Galán won both tournaments in Italy, with a dominant performance in Rome, while Coello and Tapia won the Málaga P1 to close out the first half of the season with a 4–4 record against "ChinGálan" in finals and six titles to their name, matching Galán's tally (with Chingotto having five). The Genoa P2 semifinals also featured one of the most highly anticipated clashes, with the tie between Galán and Lebrón, with Galán coming out on top.

On the women's side, the world number ones Ari and Paula also won two tournaments, in Rome and Málaga (defeating Cláudia and Gemma in the latter's final), but failed to secure a third, suffering a surprise loss in Genoa to Marta Ortega and Sofia Araújo, who were playing their first tournament as a team. With this victory, Sofia claimed her first professional title at the highest level. With their win in Malága, Ariana and Paula tied the twins Mapi and Majo as the pair with the most tournament wins in padel history, with 32 titles.

=== Final part of the season ===
On the men's side, there were changes for the final part of the season. Franco Stupaczuk and Martín Di Nenno ended their partnership, with Di Nenno becoming the new partner of Juan Lebrón, who also parted ways with Paquito Navarro after just eight tournaments together, while Stupaczuk teamed up with Mike Yanguas.

==== August ====
With both Coello/Tapia and Chingotto/Galán not competing in Nokia, Lebrón and Di Nenno claimed their first title as a team, Lebrón's 39th, while in the women's side Ariana and Paula secured their 33rd, becoming the most successful women's pair in the history of padel.

==== September–October ====
In September, the dominance of the top two men's pairs continued, with the two teams facing each other in Rotterdam, Valladolid, and Paris, however, the world number ones reigned supreme, as Coello and Tapia won all three tournaments. In Paris, Galán and Lebrón faced each other again, with Galán coming out on top for the second time. On the women's side, the top two pairs also met in the finals, with Ariana and Paula extending their record by winning in Rotterdam, while Cláudia and Gemma triumphed in Valladolid. Ariana and Paula also went on to win the Paris Major as well.

Just as in Bordeaux and Nokia, four of the top five men's pairs opted not to compete in the season's nineteenth tournament in Giza, with Ariana and Paula also sitting it out. Franco Stupaczuk and Mike Yanguas won the tournament, marking the third time in 2024 that a pair not including Coello, Tapia, or Galán won a men's tournament, while on the women's side, Marta Ortega and Sofia Araujo secured their second title together.

==== November–December ====
In the following four tournaments, Coello and Tapia continued their dominant form, winning the tournaments in Dubai, Kuwait, Mexico, and Milan. This brought them to their ninth consecutive title, and fourteenth overall, marking a season with just six losses in 99 matches. After the summer break, they had a 45-match winning streak, and with the victory in Mexico, they mathematically secured the year-end world number one ranking for the second consecutive season. The biggest surprise came with their rivals Chingotto and Galán, who, after being eliminated in the semifinals of Kuwait and Mexico by Franco Stupaczuk and Mike Yanguas, failed to reach the finals for the first time. Since forming their partnership at Puerto Cabello P2, 'ChinGalán' had reached 14 consecutive finals, surpassing the record of 12 finals set by Fernando Belasteguín and Pablo Lima in 2016.

In the women's division, however, the competition was more open. While Bea González and Delfina Brea won in Dubai, Bea's first tournament back after injury, Ariana Sánchez and Paula Josemaría secured their 36th title as a pair in Kuwait (their ninth of 2024). This mathematically guaranteed them the year-end world number one ranking, tying them with the Fernando Belasteguín and Pablo Lima duo as the second most successful partnership of all time. Meanwhile, in Mexico and Milan, Cláudia and Gemma continued their strong form by winning both tournaments.

In Milan, Fernando Belasteguín played the last tournament of his career. In the final tournament of the year, the Premier Padel Finals, Claudia Fernández and Gemma Triay aimed to equal their 6–6 record against the number 1 seed before splitting as a pair. However, Ariana and Paula would win to finish the year with their tenth trophy. In the men's category, Coki Nieto and Jon Sanz reached the final, where they ended the win streak of Agustín Tapia and Arturo Coello to claim the final title of the season.

== Points and money distribution ==
Below is a series of tables showing the FIP ranking points and money a player can earn in Premier Padel tournaments.

=== Men's Points ===
Event	First Round	Second Round	Last Qualy	Bonus Qualy	Round of 64	Round of 32	Round of 16	QF	SF	F	W
Major	25		40	30	40	90	180	360	720	1200	2000
Tour Finals											1500
P1	12		20	15	20	45	90	180	360	600	1000
P2		7	15	7		15	45	90	180	300	500

=== Women's Points ===
Event	First Round	Second Round	Last Qualy	Bonus Qualy	Round of 64	Round of 32	Round of 16	QF	SF	F	W
Major			25	30	40	90	180	360	720	1200	2000
Tour Finals											1500
P1	12		20	15		20	90	180	360	600	1000
P2		7	15	7		15	45	90	180	300	500

=== Men's Prize Money ===
Event	First Round	Second Round	Last Qualy	Round of 64	Round of 32	Round of 16	QF	SF	F	W
Major			€820	€1,477	€2,953	€5,250	€8,531	€13,125	€23,625	€47,250
Tour Finals										
P1			€1,266		€1,922	€2,625	€4,500	€7,125	€13,500	€25,500
P2			€891		€1,781		€3,000	€4,500	€8,250	€15,000

=== Women's Prize Money ===
Event	First Round	Second Round	Last Qualy	Round of 64	Round of 32	Round of 16	QF	SF	F	W
Major			€820	€1,477	€2,953	€5,250	€8,531	€13,125	€23,625	€47,250
Tour Finals										
P1			€638		€1,009	€2,019	€3,400	€5,100	€9,350	€17,000
P2			€673		€1,009		€1,700	€2,550	€4,675	€8,500

== Tournaments and results ==
Major P1 P2 Premier Padel Finals

Tournaments

Tournament	Date	Men's			Women's		
Tournament	Date	Winners	Score	Runners-up	Winners	Score	Runners-up
(Saudi Arabia) Riyadh P1	24 February – 2 March	(Spain) Alejandro Galán (Spain) Juan Lebrón	6–7 / 6–4 / 6–4	(Argentina) Agustín Tapia (Spain) Arturo Coello	(Spain) Ariana Sánchez (Spain) Paula Josemaría	6–3 / 6–2	(Spain) Bea González (Argentina) Delfina Brea
Qatar Major	1 March – 8 March	(Argentina) Agustín Tapia (Spain) Arturo Coello	6–0 / 6–2	(Spain) Javi Garrido (Spain) Mike Yanguas	(Spain) Ariana Sánchez (Spain) Paula Josemaría	6–3 / 6–1	(Spain) Claudia Fernández (Spain) Gemma Triay
(Mexico) Acapulco P1	17 March – 24 March	(Argentina) Agustín Tapia (Spain) Arturo Coello	6–0 / 6–4	(Spain) Alejandro Galán (Spain) Juan Lebrón	(Argentina) Claudia Jensen (Spain) Jessica Castelló	6–3 / 6–3	(Portugal) Sofia Araujo (Argentina) Virgínia Riera
(Venezuela) Puerto Cabello P2	23 March – 31 March	(Argentina) Agustín Tapia (Spain) Arturo Coello	2–6 / 6–3 / 6–3	(Spain) Alejandro Galán (Argentina) Federico Chingotto	(Spain) Bea González (Argentina) Delfina Brea	6–4 / 6–3	(Spain) Alejandra Salazar (Spain) Tamara Icardo
(Belgium) Brussels P2	20 April – 28 April	(Spain) Alejandro Galán (Argentina) Federico Chingotto	6–4 / 6–7 / 6–2	(Argentina) Agustín Tapia (Spain) Arturo Coello	(Spain) Bea González (Argentina) Delfina Brea	6–4 / 6–4	(Spain) Claudia Fernández (Spain) Gemma Triay
(Spain) Seville P2	28 April – 5 May	(Spain) Alejandro Galán (Argentina) Federico Chingotto	7–6 / 6–4	(Argentina) Franco Stupaczuk (Argentina) Martín Di Nenno	(Spain) Bea González (Argentina) Delfina Brea	6–1 / 6–1	(Spain) Ariana Sánchez (Spain) Paula Josemaría
(Paraguay) Asunción P2	11 May – 19 May	(Argentina) Agustín Tapia (Spain) Arturo Coello	6–1 / 3–6 / 7–6	(Spain) Alejandro Galán (Argentina) Federico Chingotto	(Spain) Bea González (Argentina) Delfina Brea	6–3 / 7–5	(Spain) Claudia Fernández (Spain) Gemma Triay
(Argentina) Mar del Plata P1	18 May – 26 May	(Spain) Alejandro Galán (Argentina) Federico Chingotto	2–6 / 6–2 / 6–2	(Argentina) Agustín Tapia (Spain) Arturo Coello	(Spain) Ariana Sánchez (Spain) Paula Josemaría	6–1 / 5–7 / 6–4	(Spain) Bea González (Argentina) Delfina Brea
(Chile) Santiago P1	26 May – 3 June	(Argentina) Agustín Tapia (Spain) Arturo Coello	6–0 / 4–6 / 6–4	(Spain) Alejandro Galán (Argentina) Federico Chingotto	(Spain) Claudia Fernández (Spain) Gemma Triay	6–1 / 6–4	(Spain) Lucía Sainz (Spain) Patty Llaguno
(France) Bordeaux P2	9 June – 16 June	(Spain) Coki Nieto (Spain) Jon Sanz	6–1 / 6–4	(Spain) Alejandro Ruiz (Spain) Momo González	(Spain) Claudia Fernández (Spain) Gemma Triay	7–5 / 7–5	(Spain) Marta Ortega (Spain) Verónica Virseda
Italy Major	15 June – 23 June	(Spain) Alejandro Galán (Argentina) Federico Chingotto	6–4 / 1–6 / 6–1	(Argentina) Agustín Tapia (Spain) Arturo Coello	(Spain) Ariana Sánchez (Spain) Paula Josemaría	6–1 / 6–0	(Spain) Lucía Sainz (Spain) Patty Llaguno
(Italy) Genoa P2	30 June – 7 July	(Spain) Alejandro Galán (Argentina) Federico Chingotto	6–1 / 6–1	(Argentina) Agustín Tapia (Spain) Arturo Coello	(Spain) Marta Ortega (Portugal) Sofia Araujo	6–3 / 7–6	(Spain) Ariana Sánchez (Spain) Paula Josemaría
(Spain) Málaga P1	6 July – 14 July	(Argentina) Agustín Tapia (Spain) Arturo Coello	6–2 / 6–3	(Spain) Alejandro Galán (Argentina) Federico Chingotto	(Spain) Ariana Sánchez (Spain) Paula Josemaría	1–6 / 6–4 / 6–2	(Spain) Claudia Fernández (Spain) Gemma Triay
Finland P2	27 July – 4 August	(Spain) Juan Lebrón (Argentina) Martín Di Nenno	7–5 / 6–3	(Spain) Coki Nieto (Spain) Jon Sanz	(Spain) Ariana Sánchez (Spain) Paula Josemaría	6–3 / 6–1	(Spain) Marta Ortega (Portugal) Sofia Araujo
(Spain) Madrid P1	31 August – 8 September	(Argentina) Agustín Tapia (Spain) Arturo Coello	6–3 / 7–6	(Spain) Alejandro Galán (Argentina) Federico Chingotto	(Spain) Claudia Fernández (Spain) Gemma Triay	6–2 / 2–1 / W.O.	(Spain) Bea González (Argentina) Delfina Brea
(Netherlands) Rotterdam P1	7 September – 15 September	(Argentina) Agustín Tapia (Spain) Arturo Coello	6–2 / 6–2	(Spain) Alejandro Galán (Argentina) Federico Chingotto	(Spain) Ariana Sánchez (Spain) Paula Josemaría	6–4 / 6–4	(Spain) Claudia Fernández (Spain) Gemma Triay
(Spain) Valladolid P2	14 September – 22 September	(Argentina) Agustín Tapia (Spain) Arturo Coello	6–4 / 4–6 / 6–3	(Spain) Alejandro Galán (Argentina) Federico Chingotto	(Spain) Claudia Fernández (Spain) Gemma Triay	6–3 / 6–2	(Spain) Ariana Sánchez (Spain) Paula Josemaría
(France) Paris Major	28 September – 6 October	(Argentina) Agustín Tapia (Spain) Arturo Coello	6–2 / 6–1	(Spain) Alejandro Galán (Argentina) Federico Chingotto	(Spain) Ariana Sánchez (Spain) Paula Josemaría	6–4 / 6–0	(Spain) Andrea Ustero (Argentina) Delfina Brea
(Egypt) Giza P2	19 October – 27 October	(Argentina) Franco Stupaczuk (Spain) Miguel Yanguas	6–3 / 7–6	(Spain) Javi Garrido (Brazil) Lucas Bergamini	(Spain) Marta Ortega (Portugal) Sofia Araujo	6–4 / 6–2	(Spain) Alejandra Salazar (Spain) Jessica Castelló
(United Arab Emirates) Dubai P1	3 November – 10 November	(Argentina) Agustín Tapia (Spain) Arturo Coello	6–4 / 6–3	(Spain) Alejandro Galán (Argentina) Federico Chingotto	(Spain) Bea González (Argentina) Delfina Brea	6–2 / 6–3	(Spain) Alejandra Alonso (Spain) Andrea Ustero
Kuwait P1	9 November – 17 November	(Argentina) Agustín Tapia (Spain) Arturo Coello	6–4 / 6–2	(Spain) Miguel Yanguas (Argentina) Franco Stupaczuk	(Spain) Ariana Sánchez (Spain) Paula Josemaría	7–5 / 7–6	(Spain) Claudia Fernández (Spain) Gemma Triay
Mexico Major	23 November – 1 December	(Argentina) Agustín Tapia (Spain) Arturo Coello	4–6 / 6–1 / 6–2	(Argentina) Franco Stupaczuk (Spain) Miguel Yanguas	(Spain) Claudia Fernández (Spain) Gemma Triay	6–7 / 6–1 / 6–4	(Spain) Marta Ortega (Portugal) Sofia Araujo
(Italy) Milan P1	30 November – 8 December	(Argentina) Agustín Tapia (Spain) Arturo Coello	6–4 / 7–5	(Spain) Alejandro Galán (Argentina) Federico Chingotto	(Spain) Claudia Fernández (Spain) Gemma Triay	6–7 / 5–2 / W.O.	(Spain) Bea González (Argentina) Delfina Brea
(Spain) Premier Padel Finals	19 December – 22 December	(Spain) Coki Nieto (Spain) Jon Sanz	3–6 / 7–5 / 6–3	(Argentina) Agustín Tapia (Spain) Arturo Coello	(Spain) Ariana Sánchez (Spain) Paula Josemaría	6–3 / 6–3	(Spain) Claudia Fernández (Spain) Gemma Triay

== End of year ranking ==
Male

2024 Men's Ranking
N.º	Name	Points
1	(Argentina) Agustín Tapia	19580
1	(Spain) Arturo Coello	19580
3	(Spain) Alejandro Galán	13330
3	(Argentina) Federico Chingotto	12180
5	(Argentina) Franco Stupaczuk	8630
6	(Argentina) Martín Di Nenno	8150
7	(Spain) Juan Lebrón	7965
8	(Spain) Miguel Yanguas	7505
9	(Spain) Coki Nieto	5765
9	(Spain) Jon Sanz	5765
11	(Spain) Paquito Navarro	5310
12	(Spain) Javi Garrido	4935
13	(Spain) Momo González	4700
14	(Spain) Eduardo Alonso	4327
15	(Spain) Pablo Cardona	3315
16	(Brazil) Lucas Bergamini	3255

Female

2024 Women's Ranking
N.º	Name	Points
1	(Spain) Ariana Sánchez	16150
1	(Spain) Paula Josemaría	16150
3	(Spain) Claudia Fernández	13200
3	(Spain) Gemma Triay	13200
5	(Argentina) Delfina Brea	10100
6	(Spain) Beatriz González	7670
7	(Spain) Marta Ortega	7030
8	(Portugal) Sofia Araujo	6700
9	(Spain) Jessica Castelló	6080
10	(Argentina) Claudia Jensen	5570
11	(Spain) Lucia Sainz	5470
12	(Spain) Patricia Llaguno	5310
12	(Spain) Verónica Virseda	5310
14	(Spain) Andrea Ustero	5225
15	(Spain) Alejandra Salazar	5220
16	(Spain) Alejandra Alonso	4185
