= 2024 Bordeaux P2 =

Padel championships

- Date: 9 – 16 June
- Edition: 1st
- Category: P1
- Prize money: €250.000
- Location: Bordeaux, France
- Venue: Arkéa Arena

Champions
- Men's doubles: (Spain) Coki Nieto (Spain) Jon Sanz
- Women's doubles: (Spain) Claudia Fernández (Spain) Gemma Triay

Chronology

The 2024 Bordeaux P1 (officially 2024 Betclic Bordeaux Premier Padel P2) was the tenth tournament of the third season organized by Premier Padel, promoted by the International Padel Federation, and with the financial backing of Nasser Al-Khelaïfi's Qatar Sports Investments, now serving as the premier padel circuit.

In the women's division, the first two seeded pairs met in the finals, with Claudia Fernández and Gemma Triay reaching their fifth final of the season, where they defeated Marta Ortega and Verónica Virseda to claim their second consecutive title.

In the men's division, Coki and Jon Sanz defeated Alejandro Ruiz and Momo González to become the first non-top two ranked pair to win a men's tournament in 2024.

== Relevant Data ==
=== Tournament without the favorites ===
For this tournament, the top four ranked pairs, Tapia/Coello, Chingotto/Galán, Lebrón/Paquito, and Di Nenno/Stupaczuk, opted not to participate, with Coki Nieto and Jon Sanz starting as the top seeds.

Just as on the men's side, three of the top four pairs in the women's rankings, Josemaria/Sánchez, Brea/Gonzalez, and Salazar/Icardo, also opted not to participate in the tournament, with Claudia and Gemma starting as the top seeds.

=== Belasteguín's last semi-final ===
The appearance in the semifinals would mark the last time that Belasteguín competed for a spot in the finals in his career.

== Seeds ==
Male

Rnk.	Team	FIP Ranking Points
1	(Argentina) Fernando Belasteguín (Argentina) Juan Tello	8816
2	(Spain) Javi Garrido (Argentina) Miguel Yanguas	8340
3	(Argentina) Aléx Ruiz (Spain) Momo Gonzalez	6987
4	(Argentina) Maxi Sanchéz (Argentina) Sanyo Gutiérrez	6465
5	(Spain) Coki Nieto (Spain) Jon Sanz	6068
6	(Spain) Alejandro Arroyo (Spain) Eduardo Alonso	3983
7	(Brazil) Lucas Bergamini (Spain) Pablo Cardona	3579
8	(Argentina) Alex Chozas (Argentina) Lucho Capra	3211
9	(Spain) Francisco Gil Morales (Argentina) Ramiro Moyano	3134
10	(Spain) Javi Leal (Brazil) Lucas Campagnolo	3117
11	(Spain) Javi Rico (Spain) Juanlu Esbri	2666
12	(Spain) Ignacio Sager (Spain) Salvador Oria	2320
13	(Argentina) Juan Cruz Belluati (Argentina) Miguel Lamperti	2248
14	(Spain) Teodoro Zapata (Spain) Javier Barahona	2165
15	(Spain) Gonzalo Rubio (Spain) Jairo Bautista	2048
16	(Spain) Jaime Munoz (Spain) Javier Garcia Mora	1982

Female

Rnk.	Team	FIP Ranking Points
1	(Spain) Claudia Fernandez (Spain) Gemma Triay	14496
2	(Spain) Marta Ortega (Spain) Veronica Virseda	10339
3	(Argentina) Claudia Jensen (Spain) Jessica Castello	9107
4	(Portugal) Sofia Araújo (Argentina) Virginia Riera	8562
5	(Argentina) Lucia Sainz (Spain) Patty Llaguno	6949
6	(Spain) Andrea Ustero (Spain) Alejandra Alonso	4129
7	(Argentina) Aranzazu Osoro (Spain) Marta Marrero	3354
8	(Spain) Beatriz Caldera (Spain) Lorena Rufo	2930
9	(Spain) Maria Eulalia Rodriguez Abajo (Spain) Nuria Rodriguez Camacho	2579
10	(Russia) Ksenia Sharifova (Spain) Lucia Martinez	2482
11	(Spain) Araceli Martinez (Spain) Marina Guinart	2371
12	(France) Alix Collombon (Argentina) Julieta Bidahorria	2192
13	(Spain) Jimena Velasco (Spain) Noa Canovas	2150
14	(Spain) Barbara Las Heras (Spain) Victoria Iglesias	2148
15	(Spain) Esther Carnicero (Spain) Marina Lobo	2114
16	(Spain) Marina Lobo (Spain) Sofia Saiz	1990

== Head-to-head record between teams ranked in the top 4 during the season ==
=== Man's ===
Record	Coello–Tapia	Galán–Chingotto	Lebrón–Paquito	Di Nenno–Stupaczuk	Former Pairs	Galán–Lebrón	Paquito–Sanyo
Coello–Tapia	—	3–3	2–0	—		1–1	2–0
Galán–Chingotto	3–3	—	—	5–0		—	—
Lebrón–Paquito	0–2	—	—	0–1		—	—
Di Nenno–Stupaczuk	—	0–5	1–0	—		0–2	—
Former Pairs							
Galán–Lebrón	1–1	—	—	2–0		—	—
Paquito–Sanyo	0–2	—	—	—		—	—

=== Women's ===
Record	Ariana–Paula	Gonzalez–D. Brea	Fernandez–Triay	Icardo–Salazar	Former Pairs	Ortega–Triay	Ortega–Virseda
Ariana–Paula	—	2–1	2–3	1–0		—	1–0
B. Gonzalez–D. Brea	1–2	—	3–0	3–0		—	—
Fernandez–Triay	3–2	0–3	—	0–1		—	1–0
Icardo–Salazar	0–1	0–3	1–0	—		—	—
Former Pairs							
Ortega–Triay	—	—	—	—		—	—
Ortega–Virseda	0–1	—	0–1	—		—	—

== Draws ==
=== Men's Bracket ===
Round of 32
1	(Argentina) Belasteguin / (Argentina) J. Tello	6	7
25	(Spain) I. Vilariño / (Spain) M. Semmler	3	6
10	(Spain) J. Leal / (Brazil) L. Campagnolo	6	6
20	(Argentina) L. Augsburger / (Argentina) V. Libaak	3	4
15	(Spain) G. Rubio / (Spain) J. Bautista	6	6
Q	(Argentina) D. Cuello / (Italy) M. Cassetta	3	3
11	(Spain) J. Rico / (Spain) J. Esbri	6	6	6
8	(Argentina) A. Chozas / (Argentina) L. Capra	7	3	2
6	(Spain) A. Arroyo / (Spain) E. Alonso	4	2
Q	(Spain) A. Cepero / (Spain) M. Benitez	6	6
21	(Argentina) C.G. Gutierrez / (Spain) J. Ruiz	3	6
18	(Spain) J. Martinez / (Spain) P. Fernandez	6	7
13	(Argentina) J.C. Belluati / (Argentina) M. Lamperti	6	6	6
WC	(France) B. Blanque / (France) D. Guichard	4	7	3
16	(Spain) J. Munoz / (Spain) J.G. Mora	2	4
3	(Spain) A. Ruiz / (Spain) Momo	6	6
4	(Argentina) Maxi / (Argentina) Sanyo	6	7
WC	(Italy) A. Patiniotis / (France) T. Leygue	0	6
26	(Spain) G. Losada / J.G. Diestro	6	6
14	(Spain) J. Barahona / (Spain) T. Zapata	4	3
Q	(Spain) J. Sanchez / (Spain) M. Ortega	6	6
22	(Sweden) D. Windahl / (Spain) J. Marmolejo	1	4
12	(Spain) I. Sager / (Spain) S. Oria	4	4
7	(Brazil) L. Bergamini / (Spain) V. Ruiz	6	6
5	(Spain) Coki / (Spain) J. Sanz	6	6
24	(Spain) E. Chamero / (Chile) J. Valdes	2	1
Q	(Argentina) F. Mouriño / (Argentina) I. Piotto	4	3
23	(Italy) F. Dominguez / (Spain) R.M. Duran	6	6
19	(Spain) I. Ramirez / (Spain) J.J. Casas	3	6	1
17	(Spain) A. Ayats / (Spain) E. Goenaga	6	3	6
9	(Spain) F. Gil / (Argentina) R. Moyano	1	7	6
2	(Spain) J. Garrido / (Spain) Yanguas	6	5	4

Round of 16
1	(Argentina) Belasteguin / (Argentina) J. Tello	6	6
10	(Spain) J. Leal / (Brazil) L. Campagnolo	3	4
15	(Spain) G. Rubio / (Spain) J. Bautista	4	2
11	(Spain) J. Rico / (Spain) J. Esbri	6	6
Q	(Spain) A. Cepero / (Spain) M. Benitez	6	6
18	(Spain) J. Martinez / (Spain) P. Fernandez	4	1
13	(Argentina) J.C. Belluati / (Argentina) M. Lamperti	2	3
3	(Spain) A. Ruiz / (Spain) Momo	6	6
4	(Argentina) Maxi / (Argentina) Sanyo	5	5
26	(Spain) G. Losada / J.G. Diestro	7	7
Q	(Spain) J. Sanchez / (Spain) M. Ortega	4	3
7	(Brazil) L. Bergamini / (Spain) V. Ruiz	7	7
5	(Spain) Coki / (Spain) J. Sanz	6	6
23	(Italy) F. Dominguez / (Spain) R.M. Duran	2	4
17	(Spain) A. Ayats / (Spain) E. Goenaga	6	7
9	(Spain) F. Gil / (Argentina) R. Moyano	2	6

Quarter-Final
1	(Argentina) Belasteguin / (Argentina) J. Tello	4	6	6
11	(Spain) J. Rico / (Spain) J. Esbri	6	4	3
Q	(Spain) A. Cepero / (Spain) M. Benitez	4	6	1
3	(Spain) A. Ruiz / (Spain) Momo	6	4	2
26	(Spain) G. Losada / J.G. Diestro	6	4	1
7	(Brazil) L. Bergamini / (Spain) V. Ruiz	1	6	6
5	(Spain) Coki / (Spain) J. Sanz	6	6	6
17	(Spain) A. Ayats / (Spain) E. Goenaga	7	3	2

Semi-Finals
1	(Argentina) Belasteguin / (Argentina) J. Tello	4	6	6
3	(Spain) A. Ruiz / (Spain) Momo	6	3	7
7	(Brazil) L. Bergamini / (Spain) V. Ruiz	7	2	2
5	(Spain) Coki / (Spain) J. Sanz	6	6	6

Finals
3	(Spain) A. Ruiz / (Spain) Momo	1	4
5	(Spain) Coki / (Spain) J. Sanz	6	6

=== Women's Bracket ===
Round of 32
1	(Spain) C. Fernandez / (Spain) G. Triay
Bye
Q	(Spain) J. Bautista / (Spain) L. Arruabarrena	2	2
10	(Russia) K. Sharifova / (Spain) L. Martinez	6	6
14	(Spain) B. Las Heras / (Spain) V. Iglesias	6	2
11	(Spain) A. Martinez / (Spain) M. Guinart	7	6
12	(France) A. Collombon / (Argentina) J. Bidahorria	4	4
8	(Spain) B. Caldera / (Spain) L. Rufo	6	6
5	(Spain) L. Sainz / (Spain) P. Llaguno	6	6
21	(Spain) A. Perez / (Spain) P. Martinez	1	1
19	(Spain) A. Gracia / (Spain) M. Talavan	6	4	4
Q	(Spain) L. Manquillo / (Spain) N. Aguilar	3	6	6
15	(Spain) M. Merino / (Spain) S. Saiz	6	6
20	(Spain) M. Goyeneche / (Spain) S. Ruiz	3	4
Bye
3	(Argentina) C. Jensen / (Spain) J. Castello
4	(Portugal) S. Araújo / (Argentina) V. Riera
Bye
Q	(Spain) C. Castillon / (Brazil) R. Piltcher	7	3	4
9	(Spain) M.R. Abajo / (Spain) N. Rodriguez	6	6	6
16	(Spain) M. Lobo / (Spain) S. Saiz	3	6	7
WC	(France) C. Touly / (France) J. Barbier	6	4	6
22	(Italy) C. Orsi / (Argentina) D. Valenzuela	3	4
7	(Argentina) A. Osoro / (Spain) M. Marrero	6	6
6	(Spain) A. Ustero / (Spain) A. Alonso	6	6
18	(Spain) A. Cañellas / (Spain) T. Navarro	3	2
13	(Spain) J. Velasco / (Spain) N. Canovas	6	4	*
23	(Spain) A. Soriano / (Italy) C. Casali	1	0
17	(Spain) M. Barrera / (Spain) M. Caparros	6	6	6
Q	(Spain) M. Navarro / (Portugal) P. Ribeiro	7	0	0
Bye
2	(Spain) M. Ortega / (Spain) V. Virseda

Round of 16
1	(Spain) C. Fernandez / (Spain) G. Triay	6	6
10	(Russia) K. Sharifova / (Spain) L. Martinez	3	1
11	(Spain) A. Martinez / (Spain) M. Guinart	6	1	1
8	(Spain) B. Caldera / (Spain) L. Rufo	4	6	6
5	(Spain) L. Sainz / (Spain) P. Llaguno	6	6
Q	(Spain) L. Manquillo / (Spain) N. Aguilar	0	3
15	(Spain) M. Merino / (Spain) S. Saiz	5	3
3	(Argentina) C. Jensen / (Spain) J. Castello	7	6
4	(Portugal) S. Araújo / (Argentina) V. Riera	6	4	7
9	(Spain) M.R. Abajo / (Spain) N. Rodriguez	3	6	6
16	(Spain) M. Lobo / (Spain) S. Saiz	0	4
7	(Argentina) A. Osoro / (Spain) M. Marrero	6	6
6	(Spain) A. Ustero / (Spain) A. Alonso	6	6
13	(Spain) J. Velasco / (Spain) N. Canovas	4	2
17	(Spain) M. Barrera / (Spain) M. Caparros	1	1
2	(Spain) M. Ortega / (Spain) V. Virseda	6	6

Quarter-Final
1	(Spain) C. Fernandez / (Spain) G. Triay	6	6
8	(Spain) B. Caldera / (Spain) L. Rufo	3	4
5	(Spain) L. Sainz / (Spain) P. Llaguno	5	6	6
3	(Argentina) C. Jensen / (Spain) J. Castello	7	4	3
4	(Portugal) S. Araújo / (Argentina) V. Riera	6	7
7	(Argentina) A. Osoro / (Spain) M. Marrero	1	6
6	(Spain) A. Ustero / (Spain) A. Alonso	4	6
2	(Spain) M. Ortega / (Spain) V. Virseda	6	7

Semi-Finals
1	(Spain) C. Fernandez / (Spain) G. Triay	6	6
5	(Spain) L. Sainz / (Spain) P. Llaguno	3	2
4	(Portugal) S. Araújo / (Argentina) V. Riera	1	5
2	(Spain) M. Ortega / (Spain) V. Virseda	6	7

Finals
1	(Spain) C. Fernandez / (Spain) G. Triay	7	7
2	(Spain) M. Ortega / (Spain) V. Virseda	5	5

== Results ==
=== Round of 32 ===
Men's

Date	Winners	Score	Opponent	Refs.
12/6/2024	(Argentina) Fernando Belasteguín (Argentina) Juan Tello	6–3 / 7–6	(Spain) Ignacio Vilariño (Spain) Miguel Semmler	
11/6/2024	(Spain) Javier Leal (Brazil) Lucas Campagnolo	6–3 / 6–4	(Argentina) Leandro Augsburger (Argentina) Valentino Libaak	
12/6/2024	(Spain) Francisco Guerrero (Spain) Jairo Bautista	6–3 / 6–3	(Argentina) Dylan Cuello (Italy) Marco Cassetta	
11/6/2024	(Spain) Javier Rico (Spain) Juanlu Esbri	6–7 / 6–3 / 6–2	(Argentina) Alex Chozas (Argentina) Luciano Capra	
12/6/2024	(Spain) Álvero Cepero (Spain) Miguel Benítez	6–4 / 6–2	(Spain) Alejandro Arroyo (Spain) Eduardo Alonso	
11/6/2024	(Spain) Javier Martinez Vazquez (Spain) Pincho Fernandez	6–3 / 7–6	(Argentina) Cristian German Gutiérrez (Spain) Jorge Ruiz Gutiérrez	
12/6/2024	(Spain) Juan Cruz Belluati (Argentina) Miguel Lamperti	6–4 / 6–7 / 6–3	(France) Bastien Blanque (France) Dylan Guichard	
12/6/2024	(Spain) Aléx Ruiz (Spain) Momo Gonzalez	6–2 / 6–4	(Spain) Javier García Mora (Spain) Jaime Muñoz	
12/6/2024	(Argentina) Maxi Sánchez (Argentina) Sanyo Gutiérrez	6–0 / 7–6	(Italy) Aris Patiniotis (France) Thomas Leygue	
11/6/2024	(Spain) Guillermo Collado (Spain) Jose García Diestro	6–4 / 6–3	(Spain) Javier Gonzalez Barahona (Spain) Teodoro Zapata	
12/6/2024	(Spain) Jose Sanchez Serrano (Spain) Mario Ortega	6–1 / 6–4	(Sweden) Daniel Windahl (Spain) Jose Solano Marmolejo	
11/6/2024	(Brazil) Lucas Bergamini (Spain) Pablo Cardona	6–4 / 6–4	(Spain) Ignacio Sager (Spain) Salvador Oria	
12/6/2024	(Spain) Coki Nieto (Spain) Jon Sanz	6–2 / 6–1	(Spain) Emilio Sanchez Chamero (Chile) Javier Valdes	
12/6/2024	(Italy) Facundo Dominguez (Spain) Raúl Marcos Duran	6–4 / 6–3	(Argentina) Federico Mouriño (Argentina) Ignacio Piotto	
11/6/2024	(Spain) Arnau Ayats (Spain) Enrique Goenaga	6–3 / 3–6 / 6–1	(Spain) Ivan Ramirez (Spain) Jose Jimenez Casas	
12/6/2024	(Spain) Francisco Gil Morales (Argentina) Ramiro Moyano	1–6 / 7–5 / 6–4	(Spain) Javi Garrido (Spain) Miguel Yanguas	

Women's

Date	Winners	Score	Opponent	Refs.
11/6/2024	(Spain) Lucía Martínez (Russia) Ksenia Sharifova	6–2 / 6–2	(Spain) Julia Polo Bautista (Spain) Lara Arruabarrena	
12/6/2024	(Spain) Araceli Martinez (Spain) Marina Guinart	7–6 / 6–2	(Spain) Barbara Las Heras (Spain) Victoria Iglesias	
12/6/2024	(Spain) Beatriz Caldera (Spain) Lorena Rufo	6–4 / 6–4	(France) Alix Collombon (Argentina) Julieta Bidahorria	
12/6/2024	(Spain) Lucia Sainz (Spain) Patricia Llagunoz	6–1 / 6–1	(Spain) Agueda Perez (Spain) Patricia Martínez	
12/6/2024	(Spain) Letizia Manquillo (Spain) Noemi Aguilar	3–6 / 6–4 / 6–4	(Spain) Ana Dominguez Gracia (Spain) Marta Talavan	
12/6/2024	(Spain) Esther Carnicero (Spain) Melania Merino	6–3 / 6–4	(Spain) Martina Fassio Goyenche (Spain) Sara Ruiz	
12/6/2024	(Spain) Laia Rodriguez Abajo (Spain) Nuria Rodriguez	6–7 / 6–3 / 6–4	(Spain) Carmen Castillon (Brazil) Raquel Piltcher	
12/6/2024	(Spain) Marina Martinez Lobo (Spain) Sofía Saiz	3–6 / 6–4 / 7–6	(France) Carla Touly (France) Jessica Ginier	
12/6/2024	(Argentina) Aranzazu Osoro (Spain) Marta Marrero	6–3 / 6–3	(Italy) Carolina Orsi (Argentina) Daiara Valenzuela	
12/6/2024	(Spain) Alejandra Alonso (Spain) Andrea Ustero	6–3 / 6–2	(Spain) Ariadna Cañellas (Spain) Teresa Navarro	
12/6/2024	(Spain) Jimena Velasco (Spain) Noa Canovas	6–1 / 4–0 / W.O.	(Spain) Arantxa Soriano Perez (Italy) Carlotta Casali	
12/6/2024	(Spain) Marta Barrera (Spain) Marta Caparrós	6–7 / 6–0 / 6–0	(Spain) Marta Arellano Navarro (Portugal) Patricia Ribeiro	

=== Round of 16 ===
Men's

Date	Winners	Score	Opponent	Refs.
13/6/2024	(Argentina) Fernando Belasteguín (Argentina) Juan Tello	6–3 / 6–4	(Spain) Javier Leal (Brazil) Lucas Campagnolo	
13/6/2024	(Spain) Javier Rico (Spain) Juanlu Esbri	6–4 / 6–2	(Spain) Francisco Guerrero (Spain) Jairo Bautista	
13/6/2024	(Spain) Álvero Cepero (Spain) Miguel Benítez	6–4 / 6–1	(Spain) Javier Martinez Vazquez (Spain) Pincho Fernandez	
13/6/2024	(Spain) Aléx Ruiz (Spain) Momo Gonzalez	6–2 / 6–3	(Spain) Juan Cruz Belluati (Argentina) Miguel Lamperti	
13/6/2024	(Spain) Guillermo Collado (Spain) Jose García Diestro	7–5 / 7–5	(Argentina) Maxi Sánchez (Argentina) Sanyo Gutiérrez	
13/6/2024	(Brazil) Lucas Bergamini (Spain) Pablo Cardona	6–4 / 6–3	(Spain) Jose Sanchez Serrano (Spain) Mario Ortega	
13/6/2024	(Spain) Coki Nieto (Spain) Jon Sanz	6–2 / 6–4	(Italy) Facundo Dominguez (Spain) Raúl Marcos Duran	
13/6/2024	(Spain) Arnau Ayats (Spain) Enrique Goenaga	6–2 / 7–6	(Spain) Francisco Gil Morales (Argentina) Ramiro Moyano	

Women's

Date	Winners	Score	Opponent	Refs.
13/6/2024	(Spain) Claudia Fernandez (Spain) Gemma Triay	6–3 / 6–1	(Spain) Lucía Martínez (Russia) Ksenia Sharifova	
13/6/2024	(Spain) Beatriz Caldera (Spain) Lorena Rufo	4–6 / 6–1 / 6–1	(Spain) Araceli Martinez (Spain) Marina Guinart	
13/6/2024	(Spain) Lucia Sainz (Spain) Patricia Llaguno	6–0 / 6–3	(Spain) Letizia Manquillo (Spain) Noemi Aguilar	
13/6/2024	(Argentina) Claudia Jensen (Spain) Jessica Castelló	7–5 / 6–3	(Spain) Esther Carnicero (Spain) Melania Merino	
13/6/2024	(Portugal) Sofia Araújo (Argentina) Virginia Riera	6–3 / 4–6 / 7–6	(Spain) Laia Rodriguez Abajo (Spain) Nuria Rodriguez	
13/6/2024	(Argentina) Aranzazu Osoro (Spain) Marta Marrero	6–0 / 6–4	(Spain) Marina Martinez Lobo (Spain) Sofía Saiz	
13/6/2024	(Spain) Alejandra Alonso (Spain) Andrea Ustero	6–4 / 6–2	(Spain) Jimena Velasco (Spain) Noa Canovas	
13/6/2024	(Spain) Marta Ortega (Spain) Verónica Virseda	6–1 / 6–1	(Spain) Marta Barrera (Spain) Marta Caparrós	

=== Quarter-Finals ===
Men's

Date	Winners	Score	Opponent	Refs.
14/6/2024	(Argentina) Fernando Belasteguín (Argentina) Juan Tello	4–6 / 6–4 / 6–3	(Spain) Javier Rico (Spain) Juanlu Esbri	
14/6/2024	(Spain) Aléx Ruiz (Spain) Momo Gonzalez	6–4 / 4–6 / 2–1 / W.O.	(Spain) Álvero Cepero (Spain) Miguel Benítez	
14/6/2024	(Brazil) Lucas Bergamini (Spain) Pablo Cardona	1–6 / 6–4 / 6–1	(Spain) Guillermo Collado (Spain) Jose García Diestro	
14/6/2024	(Spain) Coki Nieto (Spain) Jon Sanz	6–7 / 6–2 / 6–3	(Spain) Arnau Ayats (Spain) Enrique Goenaga	

Women's

Date	Winners	Score	Opponent	Refs.
14/6/2024	(Spain) Claudia Fernandez (Spain) Gemma Triay	6–3 / 6–4	(Spain) Beatriz Caldera (Spain) Lorena Rufo	
14/6/2024	(Spain) Lucia Sainz (Spain) Patricia Llagunoz	5–7 / 6–4 / 6–3	(Argentina) Claudia Jensen (Spain) Jessica Castelló	
14/6/2024	(Portugal) Sofia Araújo (Argentina) Virginia Riera	6–1 / 7–6	(Argentina) Aranzazu Osoro (Spain) Marta Marrero	
14/6/2024	(Spain) Marta Ortega (Spain) Verónica Virseda	6–4 / 7–6	(Spain) Alejandra Alonso (Spain) Andrea Ustero	

=== Semi-Finals ===
Men's

Date	Winners	Score	Opponent	Refs.
15/6/2024	(Spain) Aléx Ruiz (Spain) Momo Gonzalez	6–4 / 3–6 / 7–6	(Argentina) Fernando Belasteguín (Argentina) Juan Tello	
15/6/2024	(Spain) Coki Nieto (Spain) Jon Sanz	6–7 / 6–2 / 6–2	(Brazil) Lucas Bergamini (Spain) Pablo Cardona	

Women's

Date	Winners	Score	Opponent	Refs.
15/6/2024	(Spain) Claudia Fernandez (Spain) Gemma Triay	6–3 / 6–2	(Spain) Lucia Sainz (Spain) Patricia Llaguno	
15/6/2024	(Spain) Marta Ortega (Spain) Verónica Virseda	6–1 / 7–5	(Portugal) Sofia Araújo (Argentina) Virginia Riera	

=== Finals ===
Men's

Date	Winners	Score	Opponent	Refs.
16/6/2024	(Spain) Coki Nieto (Spain) Jon Sanz	6–1 / 6–4	(Spain) Aléx Ruiz (Spain) Momo Gonzalez	

Women's

Date	Winners	Score	Opponent	Refs.
16/6/2024	(Spain) Claudia Fernandez (Spain) Gemma Triay	7–5 / 7–5	(Spain) Marta Ortega (Spain) Verónica Virseda	
