= 2023 Master Final =

Padel championships

- Date: 14 December – 17 December
- Edition: 11th
- Category: Master Final
- Location: Barcelona, Spain
- Venue: Palau Sant Jordi

Champions
- Men's doubles: (Argentina) Fede Chingotto (Spain) Paquito Navarro
- Women's doubles: (Spain) Bea González (Argentina) Delfina Brea

Chronology
Previous
Milano P1 (PP)
Next
Riyadh P1 (PP)

The WPT 2023 Master Final (officially WPT 2023 Boss Barcelona Master Final) was the twenty-second and final tournament of the eleventh edition of World Padel Tour. The tournament was played between the 14th and 17th of December 2023 at Palau Sant Jordi, Barcelona.The finals saw a record attendance for a padel match with 15.779 in attendance.

In the women's category, the third ranked pair Bea González and Delfina Brea claimed their sixth and third consecutive title of the season, defeating Aranza Osoro and Jessica Castelló in the finals. With the win Brea became the first female Argentine player to win a Master Finals, while Bea González became the youngest player to achieve it at 22 years and 23 days.

In the men's category, Federico Chingotto and Paquito Navarro won their first WPT title as pair, after surprisingly defeating the number three ranked pair Alejandro Galán and Juan Lebrón, becoming the last pair to win a title in World Padel Tour.

Before the tournament was announced that Qatar Sports Investments (QSI) would acquire World Padel Tour, merging it with Premier Padel to create a unified Padel circuit. As a result of the acquisition, the World Padel Tour ceased operations after eleven seasons as the top Padel circuit.

== Schedule ==
The final draw was played:

- Thursday 14 December: Quarterfinals.
- Friday 15 December: Quarterfinals.
- Saturday 16 December: Semifinals.
- Sunday 17 December: Finals.

== Results ==
=== Men's Bracket ===
Quarter-Final
1	(Spain) Coello / (Argentina) Tapia	6	3
(Argentina) Sanyo / (Spain) Yanguas	0	1
(Spain) A. Ruiz / (Argentina) J. Tello	6	6	4
4	(Argentina) Chingotto / (Spain) Paquito	3	7	6
3	(Spain) Galán / (Spain) Lebrón	6	2	7
(Spain) Coki / (Spain) J. Sanz	3	6	5
(Spain) J. Garrido / (Spain) Momo	1	1
2	(Argentina) F. Stupaczuk / (Argentina) Di Nenno	6	6

Semi-Finals
1	(Spain) Coello / (Argentina) Tapia	6	4	4
4	(Argentina) Chingotto / (Spain) Paquito	4	6	6
3	(Spain) Galán / (Spain) Lebrón	7	7
2	(Argentina) F. Stupaczuk / (Argentina) Di Nenno	5	5

Finals
4	(Argentina) Chingotto / (Spain) Paquito	6	6
3	(Spain) Galán / (Spain) Lebrón	1	4

=== Women's Bracket ===
Quarter-Final
1	(Spain) Ariana / (Spain) Paula	6	1	6
(Spain) T. Icardo / (Argentina) V. Riera	1	6	4
(Argentina) C. Jensen / (Spain) V. Virseda	0	4
3	(Spain) B. González / (Argentina) D. Brea	6	6
4	(Spain) A. Salazar / (Portugal) S.Araújo	7	4	2
(Argentina) A. Osoro / (Spain) J. Castelló	5	6	6
(Spain) L. Sainz / (Spain) Mapi	0	2
2	(Spain) G. Triay / (Spain) M. Ortega	6	6

Semi-Finals
1	(Spain) Ariana / (Spain) Paula	6	6	2
3	(Spain) B. González / (Argentina) D. Brea	7	3	6
(Argentina) A. Osoro / (Spain) J. Castelló	1	6	6
2	(Spain) G. Triay / (Spain) M. Ortega	6	2	4

Finals
3	(Spain) B. González / (Argentina) D. Brea	6	6
(Argentina) A. Osoro / (Spain) J. Castelló	4	1

=== Quarter-Finals ===
Men's

Date	Team A	Score	Team B	Refs.
14/12/2023	(Argentina) Agustín Tapia (Spain) Arturo Coello	6–3 / 6–0	(Spain) Mike Yanguas (Argentina) Sanyo Gutiérrez	
14/12/2023	(Argentina) Federico Chingotto (Spain) Paquito Navarro	3–6 / 7–6 / 6–4	(Spain) Alex Ruiz (Argentina) Juan Tello	
15/12/2023	(Spain) Alejandro Galán (Spain) Juan Lebrón	6–3 / 2–6 / 7–5	(Spain) Coki Nieto (Spain) Jon Sanz	
15/12/2023	(Argentina) Franco Stupaczuk (Argentina) Martín Di Nenno	6–1 / 6–1	(Spain) Javi Garrido (Spain) Momo Gonzalez	

Women's

Date	Team A	Score	Team B	Refs.
14/12/2023	(Spain) Ariana Sánchez (Spain) Paula Josemaría	6–1 / 1–6 / 6–4	(Spain) Tamara Icardo / (Argentina) Virginia Riera	
14/12/2023	(Spain) Bea González (Argentina) Delfina Brea	6–0 / 6–4	(Argentina) Claudia Jensen (Spain) Veronica Virseda	
15/12/2023	(Argentina) Aranzazu Osoro (Spain) Jessica Castelló	5–7 / 6–4 / 6–2	(Spain) Alejandra Salazar (Portugal) Sofia Araújo	
15/12/2023	(Spain) Gemma Triay (Spain) Marta Ortega	6–0 / 6–2	(Spain) Lucía Sainz (Spain) María Pilar Sánchez Alayeto	

=== Semi-Finals ===
Men's

Date	Team A	Score	Team B	Refs.
16/12/2023	(Argentina) Federico Chingotto (Spain) Paquito Navarro	4–6 / 6–4 / 6–4	(Spain) Arturo Coello (Argentina) Agustín Tapia	
16/12/2023	(Spain) Alejandro Galán (Spain) Juan Lebrón	7–5 / 7–5	(Argentina) Franco Stupaczuk (Argentina) Martín Di Nenno	

Women's

Date	Team A	Score	Team B	Refs.
16/12/2023	(Spain) Bea González (Argentina) Delfina Brea	7–6 / 3–6 / 6–2	(Spain) Ariana Sánchez (Spain) Paula Josemaría	
16/12/2023	(Argentina) Aranzazu Osoro (Spain) Jessica Castelló	1–6 / 6–2 / 6–4	(Spain) Gemma Triay (Spain) Marta Ortega	

=== Finals ===
Men's

Date	Team A	Score	Team B	Refs.
17/12/2023	(Argentina) Federico Chingotto (Spain) Paquito Navarro	6–1 / 6–4	(Spain) Alejandro Galán (Spain) Juan Lebrón	

Women's

Date	Team A	Score	Team B	Refs.
17/12/2023	(Spain) Bea González (Argentina) Delfina Brea	6–4 / 6–1	(Argentina) Aranzazu Osoro (Spain) Jessica Castelló	
