= 2023 Amsterdam Open =

Padel championships

- Date: 11 October – 15 October
- Edition: 2nd
- Category: Open
- Location: Amsterdam, Netherlands
- Venue: AFAS Live

Champions
- Men's doubles: (Argentina) Franco Stupaczuk (Argentina) Martin Di Nenno
- Women's doubles: (Spain) Ariana Sánchez (Spain) Paula Josemaría

Chronology

The WPT 2023 Amsterdam Open (officially WPT 2023 Decathlon Amsterdam Open) was the eighteenth tournament of the eleventh edition of World Padel Tour. The tournament was played between 11 October and 15 October 2023 at AFAS Live in Amsterdam, Netherlands.

In the women's category, the first and third ranked pairs met in the finals once again, with the number one team, Ariana Sánchez and Paula Josemaría, winning their thirteenth title of the season (12 in WPT and 1 in PP) after defeating Bea González and Delfi Brea in the finals. With the tournament win, Ariana and Paula mathematically guaranteed that they would finish the year in first place in the ranking.

In the men's category, the second and fourth ranked teams met in the finals, with Franco Stupaczuk and Martin Di Nenno reaching their sixth final in the last eight tournaments, and after defeating the fourth ranked Federico Chingotto and Paquito Navarro, claiming their seventh title (6 in WPT and 1 in PP). With this victory, Di Nenno and Stupaczuk reduced the gap to first place, now only 1695 points behind Coello and Tapia with 4500 points still up for grabs.

== Schedule ==
The final draw was played:

- Thursday 11 October: Round of 32.
- Thursday 12 October: Round of 16.
- Friday 13 October: Quarterfinals.
- Saturday 14 October: Semifinals.
- Sunday 15 October: Finals.

== Results ==
=== Men's Bracket ===
Round of 32
1	(Spain) Coello / (Argentina) Tapia	3	6	3
(Spain) A. Arroyo / (Spain) G. Rubio	6	4	6
(Spain) J.M. Díaz / (Argentina) M. Lamperti	4	4
(Spain) J. Bautista / (Spain) J. Muñoz	6	6
(Spain) J.G. Mora / (Spain) J.G. Barahona	6	7	6
(Spain) P. Cardona / (Spain) P. Fernandez	7	6	3
(Spain) F. Gil / (Argentina) R. Moyano	6	4
5	(Spain) A. Ruiz / (Argentina) J. Tello	7	6
8	(Spain) D. Sanchez / (Spain) J. Martinez	6	7
(Spain) I. Ramírez / (Spain) P.G. Rodrigo	3	5
(Spain) J. Esbri / (Brazil) L. Campagnolo	6	6	4
(Spain) D. Serrano / (Chile) J. Valdés	1	7	6
(Netherlands) B. Meijer / (Netherlands) S. Richters	0	1
(Spain) E. Alonso / (Spain) M. Benitez	6	6
(Argentina) L. Capra / (Argentina) Maxi	5
4	(Argentina) F. Chingotto / (Spain) Paquito	7	*
3	(Spain) Galán / (Spain) Lebrón	6	6
(Argentina) G. Gianini / (Argentina) S. Castro	2	3
(France) B. Tison / (Belgium) C. Geens	6	6
(Netherlands) B. Van Opstal / (Netherlands) U. Maarsen	2	2
(Spain) J. Rico / (Spain) R. Mendez	6	7
(Spain) J. Rico / (Spain) T. Bueno	3	6
(Argentina) A. Gutiérrez / (Argentina) Sanyo	7	6
6	(Spain) J. Garrido / (Spain) Momo	5	4
7	(Spain) Coki / (Spain) J. Sanz	3	6	4
(Spain) J. Ruiz / (Argentina) J.C. Belluati	6	2	6
(Spain) A. Ayats / (Spain) F. Guerrero	6	0
(Argentina) A. Chozas / (Spain) A. Cepero	7	6
(Argentina) L. Augsburger / (Argentina) V. Libaak	6	1	6
(Spain) I. Vilariño / (Spain) S. Oria	3	6	3
(Spain) J. Leal / (Spain) J.G. Diestro	3	5
2	(Argentina) F. Stupaczuk / (Argentina) Di Nenno	6	7

Round of 16
(Spain) A. Arroyo / (Spain) G. Rubio	5	7	6
(Spain) J. Bautista / (Spain) J. Muñoz	7	6	0
(Spain) J.G. Mora / (Spain) J.G. Barahona	6	5
5	(Spain) A. Ruiz / (Argentina) J. Tello	7	7
8	(Spain) D. Sanchez / (Spain) J. Martinez	7	6
(Chile) J. Valdés / (Spain) D. Serrano	6	2
(Spain) E. Alonso / (Spain) M. Benitez	4	1
4	(Argentina) Chingotto / (Spain) Paquito	6	6
3	(Spain) Galán / (Spain) Lebrón	7	6
(France) B. Tison / (Belgium) C. Geens	6	0
(Spain) J. Rico / (Spain) R. Mendez	6	4
(Argentina) A. Gutiérrez / (Argentina) Sanyo	7	6
(Spain) J. Ruiz / (Argentina) J.C. Belluati	6	6
(Argentina) A. Chozas / (Spain) A. Cepero	3	4
(Argentina) L. Augsburger / (Argentina) V. Libaak	7	3	2
2	(Argentina) F. Stupaczuk / (Argentina) Di Nenno	6	6	6

Quarter-Final
(Spain) A. Arroyo / (Spain) G. Rubio	3	4
5	(Spain) A. Ruiz / (Argentina) J. Tello	6	6
8	(Spain) D. Sanchez / (Spain) J. Martinez	2	2
4	(Argentina) Chingotto / (Spain) Paquito	6	6
3	(Spain) Galán / (Spain) Lebrón	3	6	6
(Argentina) A. Gutiérrez / (Argentina) Sanyo	6	1	4
(Spain) J. Ruiz / (Argentina) J.C. Belluati	3	6	2
2	(Argentina) F. Stupaczuk / (Argentina) Di Nenno	6	2	6

Semi-Finals
5	(Spain) A. Ruiz / (Argentina) J. Tello	3	3
4	(Argentina) Chingotto / (Spain) Paquito	6	6
3	(Spain) Galán / (Spain) Lebrón	6	0
2	(Argentina) F. Stupaczuk / (Argentina) Di Nenno	7	6

Finals
4	(Argentina) Chingotto / (Spain) Paquito	6	2	2
2	(Argentina) F. Stupaczuk / (Argentina) Di Nenno	4	6	6

=== Women's Bracket ===
Round of 32
1	(Spain) A. Sánchez / (Spain) P. Josemaria
Bye
(Spain) M. Barrera / (Spain) M. Villalba	6	1	7
(Spain) A. Martinez / (Spain) S. Ruiz	4	6	7
(Sweden) C. Navarro / (Spain) M. Guinart	6	6
(Spain) E. Amatriaín / (France) L. Godallier	2	2
(Russia) K. Sharifova / (Spain) M. Borrero	6	6	6
8	(Spain) Majo / (Spain) Mapi	7	4	2
7	(Argentina) A. Osoro / (Spain) J. Castelló	6	6
(Netherlands) J. Hemmes / (Netherlands) S. Jonker	0	0
(Spain) M. Martínez / (Spain) S. Saiz	2	5
(Portugal) A. Nogueira / (Spain) B. Caldera	6	7
(Spain) A. Cañellas / (Spain) N. Aguilar	1	0
(France) A. Collombon / (Spain) L. Rufo	6	6
Bye
4	(Spain) A. Salazar / (Portugal) S. Araújo
3	(Spain) B. González / (Argentina) D. Brea
Bye
(Spain) J. Velasco / (Spain) N. Canovas	1	6	2
(Spain) N. Rodriguez / (Spain) M. Talaván	6	4	6
(Netherlands) M. Koek / (Netherlands) S. Weterings	0	4
(Spain) A. Alonso / (Spain) A. Ustero	6	6
(Spain) E. Carnicero / (Spain) M. Merino	1	2
(Spain) L. Sainz / (Spain) P. Llaguno	6	6
6	(Argentina) C. Jensen / (Spain) V. Virseda	6	6
(Spain) L.R. Abajo / (Spain) S. Bellver	4	1
(Spain) M. Caparros / (Spain) T. Navarro	5	4
(Spain) C. Fernandez / (Spain) V. Iglesias	7	6
(Italy) C. Orsi / (Spain) C. Mesa	2	2
(Spain) C. Goenaga / (Spain) L. Martínez	6	6
Bye
2	(Spain) G. Triay / (Spain) M. Ortega

Round of 16
1	(Spain) A. Sánchez / (Spain) P. Josemaria	7	6
(Spain) A. Martinez / (Spain) S. Ruiz	5	1
(Sweden) C. Navarro / (Spain) M. Guinart	6	6
(Russia) K. Sharifova / (Spain) M. Borrero	4	2
7	(Argentina) A. Osoro / (Spain) J. Castelló	4	7	6
(Portugal) A. Nogueira / (Spain) B. Caldera	6	5	1
(France) A. Collombon / (Spain) L. Rufo	6	3
4	(Spain) A. Salazar / (Portugal) S. Araújo	7	6
3	(Spain) B. González / (Argentina) D. Brea	6	6
(Spain) N. Rodriguez / (Spain) M. Talaván	2	4
(Spain) A. Alonso / (Spain) A. Ustero	5	7	2
(Spain) L. Sainz / (Spain) P. Llaguno	7	5	6
6	(Argentina) C. Jensen / (Spain) V. Virseda	6	5	6
(Spain) C. Fernandez / (Spain) V. Iglesias	1	7	4
(Spain) C. Goenaga / (Spain) L. Martínez	4	3
2	(Spain) G. Triay / (Spain) M. Ortega	6	6

Quarter-Final
1	(Spain) A. Sánchez / (Spain) P. Josemaria	7	6
(Sweden) C. Navarro / (Spain) M. Guinart	5	0
7	(Argentina) A. Osoro / (Spain) J. Castelló	6	6
4	(Spain) A. Salazar / (Portugal) S. Araújo	3	2
3	(Spain) B. González / (Argentina) D. Brea	7	6
(Spain) L. Sainz / (Spain) P. Llaguno	6	4
6	(Argentina) C. Jensen / (Spain) V. Virseda	2	4
2	(Spain) G. Triay / (Spain) M. Ortega	6	6

Semi-Finals
1	(Spain) A. Sánchez / (Spain) P. Josemaría	6	6
7	(Argentina) A. Osoro / (Spain) J. Castelló	2	1
3	(Spain) B. González / (Argentina) D. Brea	6	5	6
2	(Spain) G. Triay / (Spain) M. Ortega	1	7	4

Finals
1	(Spain) A. Sánchez / (Spain) P. Josemaría	7	6
3	(Spain) B. González / (Argentina) D. Brea	6	0

=== Round of 32 ===
Men's

Date	Winners	Score	Opponent	Refs.
11/10/2025	(Spain) Alejandro Arroyo (Spain) Gonzalo Rubio	6–3 / 4–6 / 6–3	(Argentina) Agustín Tapia (Spain) Arturo Coello	
11/10/2025	(Spain) Jairo Bautista (Spain) Jaime Muñoz	6–4 / 6–4	(Spain) Juan Martín Díaz (Argentina) Miguel Lamperti	
11/10/2025	(Spain) Javier García Mora (Spain) Javier Gonzalez Barahona	6–7 / 7–6 / 6–3	(Spain) Pablo Cardona (Spain) Pincho Fernandez	
11/10/2025	(Spain) Alex Ruiz (Argentina) Juan Tello	7–6 / 6–4	(Spain) Francisco Gil (Argentina) Ramiro Moyano	
11/10/2025	(Spain) David Gala Sanchez (Spain) Javier Martinez Vazquez	6–3 / 7–5	(Spain) Iván Ramírez (Spain) Pablo García Rodrigo	
11/10/2025	(Chile) Javier Valdés (Spain) David Sanchez Serrano	1–6 / 7–6 / 6–4	(Spain) Juanlu Esbri (Brazil) Lucas Campagnolo	
11/10/2025	(Spain) Eduardo Alonso (Spain) Miguel Benitez Lara	6–0 / 6–1	(Netherlands) Bran Meijer (Netherlands) Sten Richters	
11/10/2025	(Argentina) Federico Chingotto (Spain) Paquito Navarro	7–5 / W.O.	(Argentina) Luciano Capra (Argentina) Maxi Sánchez	
11/10/2025	(Spain) Alejandro Galán (Spain) Juan Lebrón	6–2 / 6–3	(Argentina) Gonzalo Gianini (Argentina) Sebastian Castro	
11/10/2025	(France) Benjamin Tison (Belgium) Clement Geens	6–2 / 6–2	(Netherlands) Bart Van Opstal (Netherlands) Uriel Maarsen	
11/10/2025	(Spain) Javi Rico (Spain) Rafael Mendez	6–3 / 7–6	(Spain) Jose Rico (Spain) Toni Bueno	
11/10/2025	(Argentina) Agustín Gutiérrez (Argentina) Sanyo Gutiérrez	7–5 / 6–4	(Spain) Javi Garrido (Spain) Momo González	
11/10/2025	(Spain) Javi Ruiz (Argentina) Juan Cruz Belluati	6–3 / 2–6 / 6–4	(Spain) Coki Nieto (Spain) Jon Sanz	
11/10/2025	(Argentina) Alex Chozas (Spain) Alvaro Cepero	7–6 / 6–0	(Spain) Arnau Ayats (Spain) Francisco Guerrero	
11/10/2025	(Argentina) Leo Augsburger (Argentina) Valentino Libaak	6–3 / 1–6 / 6–3	(Spain) Ignacio Vilariño (Spain) Salvador Oria	
11/10/2025	(Argentina) Franco Stupaczuk (Argentina) Martin Di Nenno	6–3 / 7–5	(Spain) Javier Leal (Spain) José García Diestro	

Women's

Date	Winners	Score	Opponent	Refs.
11/10/2025	(Spain) Araceli Martinez (Spain) Sara Ruiz Soto	4–6 / 6–1 / 7–5	(Spain) Marta Barrera (Spain) Mari Carmen Villalba	
11/10/2025	(Sweden) Carolina Navarro (Spain) Marina Guinart	6–2 / 6–2	(Spain) Eli Amatriaín (France) Lea Godallier	
11/10/2025	(Russia) Ksenia Sharifova (Spain) Marta Borrero	6–7 / 6–4 / 6–2	(Spain) Majo Sánchez Alayeto (Spain) Mapi Sánchez Alayeto	
11/10/2025	(Argentina) Aranza Osoro (Spain) Jessica Castelló	6–0 / 6–0	(Netherlands) Janine Hemmes (Netherlands) Segou Jonker	
11/10/2025	(Portugal) Ana Catarina Nogueira (Spain) Beatriz Caldera	6–2 / 7–5	(Spain) Marina Martínez (Spain) Sofía Saiz	
11/10/2025	(France) Alix Collombon (Spain) Lorena Rufo	6–1 / 6–0	(Spain) Ariadna Cañellas (Spain) Noemi Aguilar	
11/10/2025	(Spain) Nuria Rodriguez (Spain) Marta Talaván	6–1 / 4–6 / 6–2	(Spain) Jimena Velasco (Spain) Noa Canovas	
11/10/2025	(Spain) Alejandra Alonso (Spain) Andrea Ustero	6–0 / 6–4	(Netherlands) Marcella Koek (Netherlands) Steffie Weterings	
11/10/2025	(Spain) Lucía Sainz (Spain) Patty Llaguno	6–1 / 6–2	(Spain) Esther Carnicero (Spain) Melania Merino Saez	
11/10/2025	(Argentina) Claudia Jensen (Spain) Verónica Virseda	6–4 / 6–1	(Spain) Laia Rodriguez Abajo (Spain) Sandra Bellver	
11/10/2025	(Spain) Claudia Fernandez (Spain) Victoria Iglesias	7–5 / 6–4	(Spain) Marta Caparros (Spain) Teresa Navarro	
11/10/2025	(Spain) Carmen Goenaga (Spain) Lucía Martínez	6–2 / 6–2	(Italy) Carolina Orsi (Spain) Carla Mesa	

=== Round of 16 ===
Men's

Date	Team A	Score	Team B	Refs.
12/10/2023	(Spain) Alejandro Arroyo (Spain) Gonzalo Rubio	5–7 / 7–6 / 6–0	(Spain) Jairo Bautista (Spain) Jaime Muñoz	
12/10/2023	(Spain) Alex Ruiz (Argentina) Juan Tello	7–6 / 7–5	(Spain) Javier García Mora (Spain) Javier Gonzalez Barahona	
12/10/2023	(Spain) David Gala Sanchez (Spain) Javier Martinez Vazquez	7–6 / 6–2	(Chile) Javier Valdés (Spain) David Sanchez Serrano	
12/10/2023	(Argentina) Federico Chingotto (Spain) Paquito Navarro	6–4 / 6–1	(Spain) Eduardo Alonso (Spain) Miguel Benitez Lara	
12/10/2023	(Spain) Alejandro Galán (Spain) Juan Lebrón	7–6 / 6–0	(France) Benjamin Tison (Belgium) Clement Geens	
12/10/2023	(Argentina) Agustín Gutiérrez (Argentina) Sanyo Gutiérrez	7–6 / 6–4	(Spain) Javi Rico (Spain) Rafael Mendez	
12/10/2023	(Spain) Javi Ruiz (Argentina) Juan Cruz Belluati	6–3 / 6–4	(Argentina) Alex Chozas (Spain) Alvaro Cepero	
12/10/2023	(Argentina) Franco Stupaczuk (Argentina) Martin Di Nenno	6–7 / 6–3 / 6–2	(Argentina) Leo Augsburger (Argentina) Valentino Libaak	

Women's

Date	Team A	Score	Team B	Refs.
12/10/2023	(Spain) Ariana Sánchez (Spain) Paula Josemaria	7–5 / 6–1	(Spain) Araceli Martinez (Spain) Sara Ruiz Soto	
12/10/2023	(Sweden) Carolina Navarro (Spain) Marina Guinart	6–4 / 6–2	(Russia) Ksenia Sharifova (Spain) Marta Borrero	
12/10/2023	(Argentina) Aranza Osoro (Spain) Jessica Castelló	4–6 / 7–5 / 6–1	(Portugal) Ana Catarina Nogueira (Spain) Beatriz Caldera	
12/10/2023	(Spain) Alejandra Salazar (Portugal) Sofia Araújo	7–6 / 6–3	(France) Alix Collombon (Spain) Lorena Rufo	
12/10/2023	(Spain) Bea González (Argentina) Delfina Brea	6–2 / 6–4	(Spain) Nuria Rodriguez (Spain) Marta Talaván	
12/10/2023	(Spain) Lucía Sainz (Spain) Patty Llaguno	7–5 / 5–7 / 6–2	(Spain) Alejandra Alonso (Spain) Andrea Ustero	
12/10/2023	(Argentina) Claudia Jensen (Spain) Verónica Virseda	6–1 / 5–7 / 6–4	(Spain) Claudia Fernandez (Spain) Victoria Iglesias	
12/10/2023	(Spain) Gemma Triay (Spain) Marta Ortega	6–4 / 6–3	(Spain) Carmen Goenaga (Spain) Lucía Martínez	

=== Quarter-Finals ===
Men's

Date	Team A	Score	Team B	Refs.
13/10/2023	(Spain) Alex Ruiz (Argentina) Juan Tello	6–3 / 6–4	(Spain) Alejandro Arroyo (Spain) Gonzalo Rubio	
13/10/2023	(Argentina) Federico Chingotto (Spain) Paquito Navarro	6–2 / 6–2	(Spain) David Gala Sanchez (Spain) Javier Martinez Vazquez	
13/10/2023	(Spain) Alejandro Galán (Spain) Juan Lebrón	3–6 / 6–1 / 6–4	(Argentina) Agustín Gutiérrez (Argentina) Sanyo Gutiérrez	
13/10/2023	(Argentina) Franco Stupaczuk (Argentina) Martin Di Nenno	6–3 / 2–6 / 6–2	(Spain) Javi Ruiz (Argentina) Juan Cruz Belluati	

Women's

Date	Team A	Score	Team B	Refs.
13/10/2023	(Spain) Ariana Sánchez (Spain) Paula Josemaria	7–5 / 6–0	(Sweden) Carolina Navarro (Spain) Marina Guinart	
13/10/2023	(Argentina) Aranza Osoro (Spain) Jessica Castelló	6–3 / 6–2	(Spain) Alejandra Salazar (Portugal) Sofia Araújo	
13/10/2023	(Spain) Bea González (Argentina) Delfina Brea	7–6 / 6–4	(Spain) Lucía Sainz (Spain) Patty Llaguno	
13/10/2023	(Spain) Gemma Triay (Spain) Marta Ortega	6–2 / 6–4	(Argentina) Claudia Jensen (Spain) Verónica Virseda	

=== Semi-Finals ===
Men's

Date	Team A	Score	Team B	Refs.
14/10/2023	(Argentina) Federico Chingotto (Spain) Paquito Navarro	6–3 / 6–3	(Spain) Alex Ruiz (Argentina) Juan Tello	
14/10/2023	(Argentina) Franco Stupaczuk (Argentina) Martin Di Nenno	7–6 / 6–0	(Spain) Alejandro Galán (Spain) Juan Lebrón	

Women's

Date	Team A	Score	Team B	Refs.
14/10/2023	(Spain) Ariana Sánchez (Spain) Paula Josemaría	6–2 / 6–1	(Argentina) Aranza Osoro (Spain) Jessica Castelló	
14/10/2023	(Spain) Bea González (Argentina) Delfina Brea	6–1 / 5–7 / 6–4	(Spain) Gemma Triay (Spain) Marta Ortega	

=== Finals ===
Men's

Date	Team A	Score	Team B	Refs.
15/10/2023	(Argentina) Franco Stupaczuk (Argentina) Martin Di Nenno	4–6 / 6–2 / 6–2	(Argentina) Federico Chingotto (Spain) Paquito Navarro	

Women's

Date	Team A	Score	Team B	Refs.
15/10/2023	(Spain) Ariana Sánchez (Spain) Paula Josemaría	7–6 / 6–0	(Spain) Bea González (Argentina) Delfina Brea	
