= Federico Chingotto =

Argentine padel player

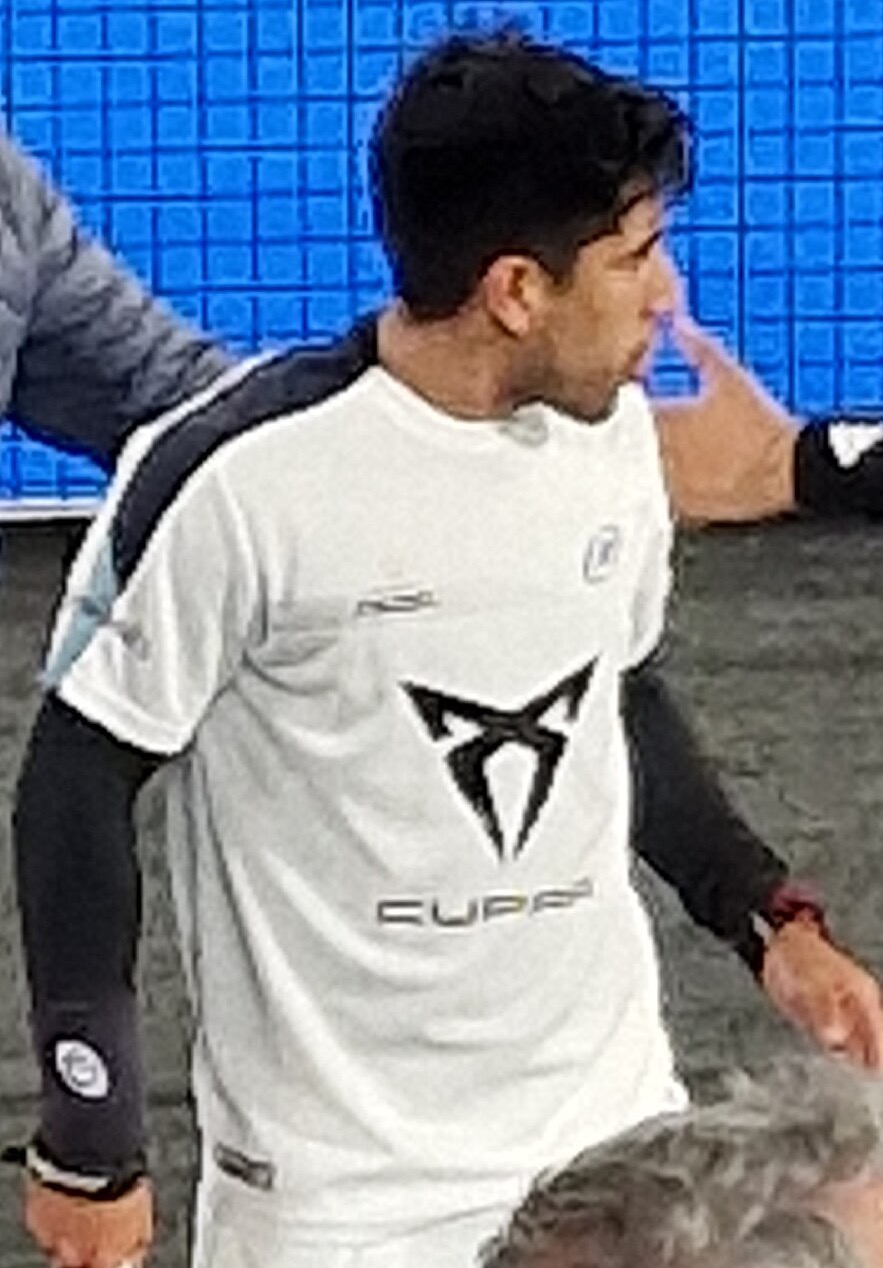

Personal information
- Nickname: Super Ratón
- Born: April 13, 1997 (age 29) Olavarría, Buenos Aires, Argentina
- Height: 1.70 m (5 ft 7 in)

Sport
- Country: Argentina
- Sport: Pádel
- Position: Drive (right-side)
- Rank: 3rd (PP)
- Partner: Alejandro Galán

Achievements and titles
- World finals: 2022, 2024
- Highest world ranking: 3rd (2025)
- Updated on 23 August 2026

Federico Chingotto (born 13 April 1997 in Olavarría, Buenos Aires, Argentina) is an Argentine professional padel player. He currently holds the number 3 spot in the FIP rankings and plays on the drive (right-side) alongside Alejandro Galán. Together, they form the second-best ranked pair in the world.

Until the end of 2022, he played alongside Juan Tello, with whom he maintained a great relationship, both on and off the court, throughout more than seven years together, becoming the longest-standing pair on the men's circuit and one of the most beloved by fans.

Since 2019, he has consistently ranked among the world's top eight pairs. Despite reaching several finals, his only title came at the 2020 Las Rozas Open, which won without actually playing the final due to his opponent's injury. It was not until December 2023, at the final tournament in WPT history, that he finally won a tournament final, claiming the Master Final alongside Paquito Navarro and winning the tournaments MVP.

Following that tournament in Barcelona, Chingotto and Paquito Navarro parted ways. In early 2024, the Argentine player teamed up with the Spaniard Momo González. However, this partnership was short-lived, as in early March 2024, following the split between Alejandro Galán and Juan Lebrón, Chingotto began playing alongside former world number one Galán, with whom he continues to compete to this day.

== Carrer ==
=== First Years ===
Federico Chingotto began to stand out in the world of padel in 2016 when, together with Juan Tello, reached the main draw of the Alicante Open where he was eliminated in the round of 16 against Paquito Navarro & Sanyo Gutiérrez by a score of 6-1 and 6-1. In the Montecarlo Open of the same year they returned to the main draw, being eliminated again by the same pair, although on this occasion for less difference. Even though these were their first tournaments on the World Padel Tour, in Argentina they were number 1 on their circuit, being one of the most promising pairs in the country.

==== 2017 ====
In 2017 they continued as a pair, and made great progress. In the Valladolid Open they reached semi-finals for the first time, where they finally ended up falling. A result they would repeat in the Alicante Open. On this occasion they would be eliminated, by 6-3, 3-6 and 4-6 against the world number 1s, Fernando Belasteguín & Pablo Lima.

==== 2019–2020 ====
In 2019, they would reached their first final at the Portugal Master after defeating the world number 1s, Maxi Sánchez & Sanyo Gutiérrez, in the semifinals, though they lost in two sets against Alejandro Galán and Pablo Lima.

In 2020, a year marked by the COVID-19 pandemic, they built on their strong 2019 performance by reaching the finals of both the Adeslas and the Valencia Open's, losing both matches to Alejandro Galán & Juan Lebrón, who would go on to become the world's top pair that year. Finally, at the Las Rozas Open, they secured their first World Padel Tour title after Pablo Lima & Paquito Navarro withdrew before the final due to an injury sustained by the Brazilian player. In that tournament, they defeated Belasteguín & Tapia in the quarterfinals (in three sets) to reach the semifinals against the world number 1s, Galán & Lebrón, a match Chingotto and Tello would win in straight sets, 6-3 and 7-5, and hours later they would be crowned champions without having to play the final.

=== Consolidation among the elite ===
Throughout 2021, they vied with the pairing of Álex Ruiz & Franco Stupaczuk for fourth place in the WPT rankings, alternating between the fourth and fifth positions, and the resulting seeded status for Open tournaments, over the course of the year. They reached the finals of the Valladolid, Portugal, and Barcelona Masters but lost each one against different opponents. Ultimately, they finished the year as the world's fifth-ranked pair, having reached four additional semifinals without managing to secure a title.

In 2022, they reached only one final, the Premier Padel's Paris Major, where they lost a hard-fought match to the world number ones, Alejandro Galán & Juan Lebrón. At the end of the year, Juan Tello decided to end the partnership to join forces with Paquito Navarro, leaving Chingotto to play temporarily alongside Martín Di Nenno. Together, they made a surprise run to the title match of the Master Final.

=== Partnership with Paquito Navarro ===
At the beginning of April, Paquito Navarro announced that his new partner was going to be Chingotto. Together they would reach the France and Amsterdam Open 1000 finals, losing both of them. Their biggest success came in the last tournament of World Padel Tour history, the Master Final, where they would defeat Alejandro Galán & Juan Lebrón to win their first and only title of the season.

=== Partnership with Alejandro Galán ===
==== 2024 ====
Chingotto started the year playing with Momo González, but the partnership lasted only three tournaments, as Alejandro Galán, after deciding to end his partnership with Juan Lebrón, invited Federico Chingotto to be his new partner. They debuted in the Puerto Cabello P2, where they reached the finals, but lost against Coello & Tapia. They improved their results in the next two tournaments, avenging their previous loss in the Brussels P2, and defeating Franco Stupaczuk and Martín Di Nenno in the Seville P2 finals.

Leading up to the summer break, they faced Coello & Tapia in six more finals, winning in Mar del Plata, Rome, and Genoa, but losing in Asunción, Santiago, and Málaga. In the Genoa semifinal, Galán faced Juan Lebrón for the first time since their split, winning the match.

After returning from the summer break, the balance seen in head-to-head matchups against their rivals vanished, with Galán and Chingotto losing five consecutive finals, in Madrid, Rotterdam, Valladolid, Paris, and Dubai, to Coello & Tapia. Their streak of 14 consecutive finals came to an end in Kuwait, where they were eliminated by Franco Stupaczuk & Mike Yanguas in the semifinals, missing out on a final for the first time, a scenario that would repeat at the following tournament in Mexico.

Chingotto and Galán would finish the season with another loss to Coello & Tapia in the Milan final, and a quarterfinal exit at the Premier Padel Finals.

==== 2025 ====
Galán and Chingotto began 2025 with a quarter-final exit against Leandro Augsburger & Pablo Cardona in the Riyadh P1. They bounced back winning the Miami and the Santiago P1's, both against Franco Stupaczuk & Juan Lebrón, and ending a 259-day drought without lifting a trophy. The first two matchups against Coello & Tapia would come in the finals of the Qatar Major and the Brussels P2, both of which they lost. They would capitaliz on their rivals' slip to win the Asunción P2, avenging their defeat in the Riyadh final.

After having to withdraw from the Buenos Aires P1, Chingotto and Galán defeated the number one ranked pair in the finals of the Italy Major, ending a losing streak against Coello & Tapia that had spanned nine consecutive finals and 343 days without a win over against them. However this would be their last win over their rivals before the summer break, losing the Bordeaux, Málaga, and Tarragona finals against them.

After the summer break, Chingotto and Galán were eliminated in the quarterfinals of the Madrid P1 and lost to their rivals again at the Paris Major and Rotterdam P1. However, victories over Coello and Tapia in Germany, Milan, and at the FIP Pairs World Cup, along with winning the Giza P1, brought them closer to the top spot in the rankings.

However, consecutive defeats in the Dubai P1 and Mexico Major finals against Coello & Tapia would end any mathematical chance for Galán and Chingotto to finish the season as the world's number one pair. On December 14, Galán and Chingotto faced Agustín Tapia & Arturo Coello in the Premier Padel Finals, losing to their rivals in three sets.

== Honours ==
=== World Padel Tour (2013–2023) ===
Winner Runner-up

==== Finals ====
N.º	Date	Tournament	Partner	Result	Opponents in the final	Career title No.
2018
1.	21 October 2018	(France) Paris Challenger	(Argentina) Juan Tello	7–5 / 6–7 / 6–2	(Argentina) Lucho Capra (Argentina) Ramiro Moyano	
2.	18 November 2018	(Spain) Arroyo de la Encomienda Challenger	(Argentina) Juan Tello	6–3 / 6–4	(Spain) Alex Ruiz (Spain) Pablo Lijó	
2019
3.	22 September 2019	Portugal Master	(Argentina) Juan Tello	4–6 / 4–6	(Spain) Alejandro Galán (Brazil) Pablo Lima	
2020
4.	9 August 2020	(Spain) Adeslas Open	(Argentina) Juan Tello	7–6 / 1–6 / 4–6	(Spain) Alejandro Galán (Spain) Juan Lebrón	
5.	6 September 2020	(Spain) Valencia Open	(Argentina) Juan Tello	3–6 / 6–7	(Spain) Alejandro Galán (Spain) Juan Lebrón	
6.	22 November 2020	(Spain) Las Rozas Open	(Argentina) Juan Tello	W.O.	(Brazil) Pablo Lima (Spain) Paquito Navarro	1st
2021
7.	27 July 2021	(Spain) Valladolid Master	(Argentina) Juan Tello	3–6 / 4–6	(Argentina) Lucho Capra (Argentina) Maxi Sánchez	
8.	5 September 2021	Portugal Master	(Argentina) Juan Tello	6–4 / 5–7 / 3–6	(Spain) Alejandro Galán (Spain) Juan Lebrón	
9.	19 September 2021	(Spain) Barcelona Master	(Argentina) Juan Tello	2–6 / 6–3 / 4–6	(Argentina) Martín Di Nenno (Spain) Paquito Navarro	
2022
10.	18 December 2022	(Spain) Master Final	(Spain) Paquito Navarro	4–6 / 7–6 / 2–6	(Spain) Alejandro Galán (Spain) Juan Lebrón	
2023
11.	18 June 2023	France Open 1000	(Spain) Paquito Navarro	2–6 / 4–6	(Argentina) Franco Stupaczuk (Argentina) Martín Di Nenno	
12.	15 October 2023	(Netherlands) Amsterdam Open 1000	(Spain) Paquito Navarro	6–4 / 2–6 / 2–6	(Argentina) Franco Stupaczuk (Argentina) Martín Di Nenno	
13.	12 December 2023	(Spain) Master Final	(Argentina) Fede Chingotto	6–1 / 6–4	(Spain) Alejandro Galán (Spain) Juan Lebrón	2nd

Tournaments won	Challenger	Open	Master	Master Final	Total
Tournaments won	0	1	0	1	2

=== Premier Padel (2022–Present) ===
Winner Runner-up

==== Finals ====
N.º	Date	Tournament	Partner	Result	Opponents in the final	Career title No.
2022
14.	17 July 2022	(France) Paris Major	(Argentina) Juan Tello	3–6 / 6–4 / 4–6	(Spain) Alejandro Galán (Spain) Juan Lebrón	
2023
15.	16 July 2023	Italy Major	(Spain) Paquito Navarro	5–7 / 6–7	(Argentina) Agustín Tapia (Spain) Arturo Coello	
16.	23 July 2023	(Spain) Madrid P1	(Spain) Paquito Navarro	5–7 / 2–6	(Argentina) Agustín Tapia (Spain) Arturo Coello	
17.	10 September 2023	(France) Paris Major	(Spain) Paquito Navarro	6–7 / 1–6	(Argentina) Agustín Tapia (Spain) Arturo Coello	
2024
18.	31 March 2024	(Venezuela) Puerto Cabello P2	(Spain) Alejandro Galán	6–2 / 3–6 / 3–6	(Argentina) Agustín Tapia (Spain) Arturo Coello	
19.	28/4/2024	(Belgium) Brussels P2	(Spain) Alejandro Galán	6–4 / 6–7 / 6–2	(Argentina) Agustín Tapia (Spain) Arturo Coello	3rd
20.	5/5/2024	(Spain) Seville P2	(Spain) Alejandro Galán	7–6 / 6–4	(Argentina) Franco Stupaczuk (Argentina) Martín Di Nenno	4th
21.	19 May 2024	(Paraguay) Asunción P2	(Spain) Alejandro Galán	1–6 / 6–3 / 6–7	(Argentina) Agustín Tapia (Spain) Arturo Coello	
22.	26 May 2024	(Argentina) Mar de Plata P1	(Spain) Alejandro Galán	2–6 / 6–2 / 6–2	(Argentina) Agustín Tapia (Spain) Arturo Coello	5th
23.	3 June 2024	(Chile) Santiago P1	(Spain) Alejandro Galán	0–6 / 6–4 / 4–6	(Argentina) Agustín Tapia (Spain) Arturo Coello	
24.	23 June 2024	Italy Major	(Spain) Alejandro Galán	6–4 / 1–6 / 6–1	(Argentina) Agustín Tapia (Spain) Arturo Coello	6th
25.	7 July 2024	(Italy) Genova P2	(Spain) Alejandro Galán	6–1 / 6–1	(Argentina) Agustín Tapia (Spain) Arturo Coello	7th
26.	14 July 2024	(Spain) Málaga P1	(Spain) Alejandro Galán	2–6 / 3–6	(Argentina) Agustín Tapia (Spain) Arturo Coello	
27.	8 September 2024	(Spain) Madrid P1	(Spain) Alejandro Galán	3–6 / 6–7	(Argentina) Agustín Tapia (Spain) Arturo Coello	
28.	15 September 2024	(Netherlands) Rotterdam P1	(Spain) Alejandro Galán	2–6 / 2–6	(Argentina) Agustín Tapia (Spain) Arturo Coello	
29.	22 September 2024	(Spain) Valladolid P2	(Spain) Alejandro Galán	4–6 / 6–4 / 3–6	(Argentina) Agustín Tapia (Spain) Arturo Coello	
30.	6 October 2024	(France) Paris Major	(Spain) Alejandro Galán	2–6 / 1–6	(Argentina) Agustín Tapia (Spain) Arturo Coello	
31.	10 November 2024	(United Arab Emirates) Dubai P1	(Spain) Alejandro Galán	4–6 / 3–6	(Argentina) Agustín Tapia (Spain) Arturo Coello	
32.	8 December 2024	(Italy) Milan P1	(Spain) Alejandro Galán	4–6 / 5–7	(Argentina) Agustín Tapia (Spain) Arturo Coello	
2025
33.	23 March 2025	(United States) Miami P1	(Spain) Alejandro Galán	6–1 / 7–6	(Argentina) Franco Stupaczuk (Spain) Juan Lebrón	8th
34.	31 March 2025	(Chile) Santiago P1	(Spain) Alejandro Galán	W.O.	(Argentina) Franco Stupaczuk (Spain) Juan Lebrón	9th
35.	19 April 2025	Qatar Major	(Spain) Alejandro Galán	6–7 / 2–6	(Argentina) Agustín Tapia (Spain) Arturo Coello	
36.	27 April 2025	(Belgium) Brussels P2	(Spain) Alejandro Galán	6–2 / 4–6 / 1–6	(Argentina) Agustín Tapia (Spain) Arturo Coello	
37.	25 May 2025	(Paraguay) Asunción P2	(Spain) Alejandro Galán	7–6 / 6–1	(Argentina) Leandro Augsburger (Spain) Pablo Cardona	10th
38.	15 June 2025	Italy Major	(Spain) Alejandro Galán	6–3 / 7–5	(Argentina) Agustín Tapia (Spain) Arturo Coello	11th
39.	6 July 2025	(France) Bordeaux P2	(Spain) Alejandro Galán	6–7 / 4–6	(Argentina) Agustín Tapia (Spain) Arturo Coello	
40.	20 July 2025	(Spain) Málaga P1	(Spain) Alejandro Galán	4–6 / 5–7	(Argentina) Agustín Tapia (Spain) Arturo Coello	
41.	3 August 2025	(Spain) Tarragona P1	(Spain) Alejandro Galán	6–7 / 5–7	(Argentina) Agustín Tapia (Spain) Arturo Coello	
42.	7 September 2025	(France) Paris Major	(Spain) Alejandro Galán	1–6 / 4–6	(Argentina) Agustín Tapia (Spain) Arturo Coello	
43.	28 September 2025	Germany P2	(Spain) Alejandro Galán	7–6 / 6–2	(Argentina) Agustín Tapia (Spain) Arturo Coello	12th
44.	5 October 2025	(Netherlands) Rotterdam P1	(Spain) Alejandro Galán	3–6 / 6–7	(Argentina) Agustín Tapia (Spain) Arturo Coello	
45.	12 October 2025	(Italy) Milano P1	(Spain) Alejandro Galán	2–6 / 6–3 / 6–0	(Argentina) Agustín Tapia (Spain) Arturo Coello	13th
46.	2 November 2025	(Egypt) Giza P2	(Spain) Alejandro Galán	6–1 / 6–2	(Spain) Jon Sanz (Spain) Paquito Navarro	14th
47.	9 November 2025	(Kuwait) FIP Pairs World Cup	(Spain) Alejandro Galán	2–6 / 7–5 / 6–2	(Argentina) Agustín Tapia (Spain) Arturo Coello	15th
48.	16 November 2025	(United Arab Emirates) Dubai P1	(Spain) Alejandro Galán	3–6 / 4–6	(Argentina) Agustín Tapia (Spain) Arturo Coello	
49.	30 November 2025	Mexico Major	(Spain) Alejandro Galán	4–6 / 6–7	(Argentina) Agustín Tapia (Spain) Arturo Coello	
50.	14 December 2025	(Spain) Premier Padel Finals	(Spain) Alejandro Galán	7–6 / 3–6 / 6–7	(Argentina) Agustín Tapia (Spain) Arturo Coello	
2026
51.	14 February 2026	(Saudi Arabia) Riyadh P1	(Spain) Alejandro Galán	4–6 / 2–6	(Argentina) Agustín Tapia (Spain) Arturo Coello	
52.	8 March 2026	(Spain) Gijón P2	(Spain) Alejandro Galán	7–5 / 7–6	(Argentina) Agustín Tapia (Spain) Arturo Coello	16th
53.	29 March 2026	(United States) Miami P1	(Spain) Alejandro Galán	7–5 / 3–6 / 6–3	(Argentina) Agustín Tapia (Spain) Arturo Coello	17th
54.	18 April 2026	(Egypt) Giza P2	(Spain) Alejandro Galán	6–4 / 6–1	(Argentina) Franco Stupaczuk (Spain) Mike Yanguas	18th
55.	10 May 2026	(Paraguay) Asunción P2	(Spain) Alejandro Galán	6–3 / 7–5	(Argentina) Agustín Tapia (Spain) Arturo Coello	19th
56.	17 May 2026	(Argentina) Buenos Aires P1	(Spain) Alejandro Galán	6–2 / 6–1	(Argentina) Agustín Tapia (Spain) Arturo Coello	20th
57.	7 June 2026	Italy Major	(Spain) Alejandro Galán	5–7 / 6–7	(Argentina) Agustín Tapia (Spain) Arturo Coello	
58.	14 June	(Spain) Valencia P1	(Spain) Alejandro Galán	7–6 / 1–6 / 6–7	(Argentina) Agustín Tapia (Spain) Arturo Coello	
59.	28 June 2026	(Spain) Valladolid P2	(Spain) Alejandro Galán	4–6 / 3–6	(Argentina) Agustín Tapia (Spain) Arturo Coello	
60.	5 July 2026	(France) Bordeaux P2	(Spain) Alejandro Galán	7–5 / 6–7 / 2–6	(Argentina) Agustín Tapia (Spain) Arturo Coello	
62.	2 August 2026	(South Africa) Pretoria P1	(Spain) Alejandro Galán	6–2 / 5–7 / 7–6	(Spain) Francisco Guerrero (Spain) Javier Leal	21st
63.	9 August 2026	(United Kingdom) London P1	(Spain) Alejandro Galán	6–3 / 5–7 / 7–5	(Argentina) Agustín Tapia (Spain) Arturo Coello	
64.	6 September 2026	(Spain) Madrid P1	(Spain) Alejandro Galán	6–4 / 5–7 / 6–4	(Spain) Coki Nieto (Spain) Mike Yanguas	22nd
65.	9 August 2026	(France) Paris Major	(Spain) Alejandro Galán	3–6 / 6–4 / 6–7	(Argentina) Agustín Tapia (Spain) Arturo Coello	

Tournaments won	P2	P1	Major	PP Final	FIP Pairs World Cup	Total
Tournaments won	9	8	2	0	1	20

=== Other Titles ===
- 2022 Padel World Championship
- 2024 Padel World Championship
