= 2026 Pretoria P1 =

Premier Padel tournament held in Pretoria

- Date: 26 July – 2 August
- Edition: 1st
- Category: P1
- Prize money: €479.068
- Location: Pretoria, South Africa
- Venue: SunBet Arena
- Court speed: Fast

Champions
- Men's doubles: (Spain) Alejandro Galán (Argentina) Federico Chingotto
- Women's doubles: (Argentina) Delfina Brea (Spain) Gemma Triay

Chronology

The 2026 Pretoria P1 (officially 2026 Premier Padel Pretoria P1) was the fourteenth tournament of the fifth season organized by Premier Padel, the premier padel circuit, promoted by the International Padel Federation, and with the financial backing of Nasser Al-Khelaïfi's Qatar Sports Investments.

In the women's category, the new pair ranked number 4 by the FIP, Claudia Fernández and Martina Calvo, reached the final in their first tournament together. In the title match, they faced and were defeated by the world number 1s, Delfina Brea and Gemma Triay, who claimed their fifth title of 2026 and became the inaugural women's winners of the Pretoria P1.

In the men's category, Francisco Guerrero and Javi Leal, the seventh-ranked pair, reached the finals, becoming the first duo outside the top four to do so in 2026 and ending a streak of 27 consecutive finals appearances by the world number one pair, Agustín Tapia and Arturo Coello. In the final, they were defeated in three sets by Alejandro Galán and Federico Chingotto, who claimed their sixth title of 2026 and became the inaugural men's winners of the Pretoria P1.

== Relevant Data ==
=== Partner Swap at the Top of the Rankings ===
At this tournament, the players forming the No. 4 and No. 6 pairs made their debuts with new partners, having swapped partners with one another. Young players Claudia Fernández and Martina Calvo have teamed up, starting as the world's No. 4 pair, while Marta Ortega and Sofia Araújo, known as "Las Lupitas", have reunited with the goal of regaining the form that once established them among the elite duos, entering the tournament as the No. 5 seeds.

=== One of the top favorites out of the tournament due to injury ===
Ariana Sánchez and Andrea Ustero, the world's number 3 pair, who missed the previous tournament in Málaga due to an injury sustained by the young player from Barcelona, we're also unable to compete in the Pretoria P1.

=== Stupa and Yanguas Out of Pretoria P1 ===
As announced by Mike Yanguas on social media, the world's No. 4 ranked pair did not participate in the tournament due to physical issues affecting Franco Stupaczuk.

=== Guerrero and Leal end Coello and Tapia's streak of 29 finals ===
The loss to Francisco Guerrero and Javi Leal in the semifinals brought an end to a run of 29 consecutive finals for Agustín Tapia and Arturo Coello, a streak during which they had reached the title match in every tournament since the Asunción P2 in May 2025, marking a span of 448 days of reaching every final.

== Seeds ==
Male

Rnk.	Team	FIP Ranking Points
1	(Argentina) Agustín Tapia (Spain) Arturo Coello	42674
2	(Spain) Alejandro Galán (Argentina) Federico Chingotto	34788
3	(Spain) Juan Lebrón (Argentina) Leandro Augsburguer	15704
4	(Argentina) Franco Stupaczuk (Spain) Mike Yanguas	13569
5	(Argentina) Martín Di Nenno (Spain) Paquito Navarro	10923
6	(Spain) Coki Nieto (Spain) Jon Sanz	10628
7	(Spain) Francisco Guerrero (Spain) Javi Leal	7873
8	(Brazil) Lucas Campagnolo (Spain) Momo González	7616
9	(Spain) Javier Garrido (Brazil) Lucas Bergamini	6618
10	(Argentina) Juan Tello (Argentina) Maximiliano Arce	5314
11	(Spain) Aimar Goñi (Spain) Eduardo Alonso	5141
12	(Spain) Alejandro Ruiz (Spain) Javier Garcia Mora	5038
13	(Spain) Juanlu Esbri (Argentina) Sanyo Gutiérrez	4391
14	(Argentina) Alex Chozas (Spain) Javier Barahona	4338
15	(United Arab Emirates) Inigo Jofre (Spain) Jairo Bautista	4303
16	(Spain) Alejandro Arroyo (Spain) Jose Jimenez Casas	4285

Female

Rnk.	Team	FIP Ranking Points
1	(Argentina) Delfina Brea (Spain) Gemma Triay	36514
2	(Spain) Bea González (Spain) Paula Josemaria	28743
3	(Spain) Ariana Sánchez (Spain) Andrea Ustero	22496
4	(Spain) Claudia Fernandéz (Spain) Martina Calvo	15801
5	(Spain) Marta Ortega (Portugal) Sofia Araújo	12948
6	(Argentina) Claudia Jensen (Spain) Tamara Icardo	12233
7	(Spain) Alejandra Alonso (Spain) Marina Guinart	8964
8	(Spain) Alejandra Salazar (Argentina) Aranzazu Osoro	7615
9	(Spain) Jimena Velasco (Spain) Veronica Virseda	6600
10	(Spain) Beatriz Caldera (Spain) Carmen Goenaga	6458
11	(Spain) Lorena Rufo (Spain) Victoria Iglesias	5268
12	(Argentina) Martina Fassio Goyeneche (Spain) Raquel Eugenio Barrera	5162
13	(Italy) Giulia Dal Pozzo (Spain) Nuria Rodriguez	4557
14	(Spain) Lucía Sainz (Spain) Sofia Saiz	3950
15	(Spain) Jessica Castelló (Spain) Marta Talavan	3758
16	(Spain) Maria Rodriguez Abajo (Spain) Noa Canovas	3692

== Head-to-head record between teams ranked in the top 4 during the season ==
=== Men's ===
Record	Coello–Tapia	Galán–Chingotto	Augsburger–Lebrón	Stupaczuk–Yanguas
Coello–Tapia	—	5–4	6–1	5–0
Galán–Chingotto	4–5	—	3–2	3–0
Augsburger–Lebrón	1–6	2–3	—	—
Stupaczuk–Yanguas	0–5	0–3	—	—

=== Women's ===
Record	D. Brea–Triay	B. González–Paula	Ariana–Ustero	C. Fernández–M. Calvo	Former Pairs	Araúijo–C. Fernández
D. Brea–Triay	—	2–5	4–3	1–0		3–0
B. González–Paula	5–2	—	4–3	0–1		2–0
Ariana–Ustero	3–4	3–4	—	—		1–0
C. Fernández–M. Calvo	0–1	1–0	—	—		—
Former Pairs
Araúijo–C. Fernández	0–3	0–2	0–1	—		—

== Draws ==
=== Men's Bracket ===
Round of 32
1	(Spain) Coello / (Argentina) Tapia	6	6
19	(Argentina) G. Alfonso / (Argentina) V. Libaak	4	4
Q	(Spain) M. Font / (Spain) P. Ambel	7	3	6
11	(Spain) A. Goñi / (Spain) E. Alonso	5	6	7
16	(Spain) A. Arroyo / (Spain) J.J. Casas	6	6
35	(United Arab Emirates) I. Vilariño / (Spain) P. Fernandez	4	3
28	(Spain) E. Goenaga / (Spain) M. Castaño	7	6	6
6	(Spain) Coki / (Spain) J. Sanz	6	7	4
7	(Spain) F. Guerrero / (Spain) J. Leal	6	3	6
17	(Spain) G. Collado / (Spain) P.H. Alvarez	3	6	3
18	(Argentina) L. Aguirre / (Spain) P.G. Rodrigo	6	6
14	(Argentina) A. Chozas / (Spain) J. Barahona	2	4
15	(United Arab Emirates) I. Jofre / (Spain) J. Bautista	7	3	7
21	(Spain) D. Santigosa / (Argentina) M. Blasco	6	6	6
23	(Spain) F. Gil / (Spain) P. Lijó	4	3
3	(Spain) Lebrón / (Argentina) L. Augsburger	6	6
LL	(Italy) A. Montiel / (Italy) F. Abbate	6	6
Q	(Argentina) F. Mouriño / (Spain) M. Quilez	3	4
31	(Argentina) I. Piotto / (Argentina) J.C. Belluati	6	3	4
13	(Spain) J. Esbri / (Argentina) Sanyo	4	6	6
12	(Spain) Á. Ruiz / (Spain) J.G. Mora	6	6
20	(Spain) D.G. Sánchez / (Italy) E. Jensen	2	3
22	(Spain) J.G. Diestro / (Spain) M. Sintes	2	1
5	(Argentina) Di Nenno / (Spain) Paquito	6	6
8	(Brazil) L. Campagnolo / (Spain) Momo	6	6	6
29	(Spain) J. Ruiz / (Spain) S. Pineda	7	2	3
36	(Italy) D. Perino / (Italy) F. Dominguez	4	3
10	(Argentina) J. Tello / (Argentina) M. Arce	6	6
9	(Spain) J. Garrido / (Brazil) L. Bergamini	6	6
25	(Spain) M. Ortega / (Spain) V. Ruiz	2	1
37	(Argentina) J. Rubini / (Argentina) Maxi	2	6
2	(Argentina) Chingotto / (Spain) Galán	6	7

Round of 16
1	(Spain) Coello / (Argentina) Tapia	5	6	6
11	(Spain) A. Goñi / (Spain) E. Alonso	7	4	2
16	(Spain) A. Arroyo / (Spain) J.J. Casas	6	6
28	(Spain) E. Goenaga / (Spain) M. Castaño	2	4
7	(Spain) F. Guerrero / (Spain) J. Leal	4	6	6
18	(Argentina) L. Aguirre / (Spain) P.G. Rodrigo	6	2	4
15	(United Arab Emirates) I. Jofre / (Spain) J. Bautista	6	3
3	(Spain) Lebrón / (Argentina) L. Augsburger	7	6
LL	(Italy) A. Montiel / (Italy) F. Abbate	1	4
13	(Spain) J. Esbri / (Argentina) Sanyo	6	6
12	(Spain) Á. Ruiz / (Spain) J.G. Mora	6	6	6
5	(Argentina) Di Nenno / (Spain) Paquito	7	4	3
8	(Brazil) L. Campagnolo / (Spain) Momo	4	3
10	(Argentina) J. Tello / (Argentina) M. Arce	6	6
9	(Spain) J. Garrido / (Brazil) L. Bergamini	3	5
2	(Argentina) Chingotto / (Spain) Galán	6	7

Quarter-Final
1	(Spain) Coello / (Argentina) Tapia	7	6
16	(Spain) A. Arroyo / (Spain) J.J. Casas	6	2
7	(Spain) F. Guerrero / (Spain) J. Leal	6	7	7
3	(Spain) Lebrón / (Argentina) L. Augsburger	7	5	6
13	(Spain) J. Esbri / (Argentina) Sanyo	6	6
12	(Spain) Á. Ruiz / (Spain) J.G. Mora	0	3
10	(Argentina) J. Tello / (Argentina) M. Arce	3	6	2
2	(Argentina) Chingotto / (Spain) Galán	6	1	6

Semi-Finals
1	(Spain) Coello / (Argentina) Tapia	5	5
7	(Spain) F. Guerrero / (Spain) J. Leal	7	7
13	(Spain) J. Esbri / (Argentina) Sanyo	5	4
2	(Argentina) Chingotto / (Spain) Galán	7	6

Finals
7	(Spain) F. Guerrero / (Spain) J. Leal	2	7	6
2	(Argentina) Chingotto / (Spain) Galán	6	5	7

=== Women's Bracket ===
Round of 32
1	(Argentina) D. Brea / (Spain) G. Triay
Bye
13	(Italy) G. Dal Pozzo / (Spain) N. Rodriguez	6	6
16	(Spain) M.R. Abajo / (Spain) N. Canovas	3	4
22	(Spain) J.P. Bautista / (Spain) M. Lobo	6	3	6
Q	(Spain) C.F. Gonzalez / (Spain) N. Santana	2	6	3
10	(Spain) B. Caldera / (Spain) C. Goenaga	5	2
6	(Argentina) C. Jensen / (Spain) T. Icardo	7	6
8	(Spain) A. Salazar / (Argentina) A. Osoro	6	6
18	(France) A. Collombon / (Russia) K. Sharifova	2	4
LL	(South Africa) T. Pieters / (South Africa) S. Roets	0	0
12	(Argentina) M. Goyeneche / (Spain) R. Barrera	6	6
Q	(Spain) A. Martinez / (Spain) N. Lopez Diaz	4	6
21	(Italy) G. Marchetti / (Spain) L. Arruabarrena	6	7
Bye
5	(Spain) M. Ortega / (Portugal) S. Araújo
4	(Spain) C. Fernández / (Spain) M. Calvo
Bye
20	(Argentina) J. Bidahorria / (Spain) M. Caparros	6	6
19	(Spain) A. Martinez / (Spain) L. Luján	3	2
Q	(Spain) B. Las Heras / (Russia) D. Kucheriavaia	3	7	6
17	(Spain) J. Montes / (Spain) M. Barrera	6	6	7
11	(Spain) L. Rufo / (Spain) V. Iglesias	6	6
9	(Spain) J. Velasco / (Spain) V. Virseda	3	4
7	(Spain) A. Alonso / (Spain) M. Guinart	6	6
23	(Spain) C. Escacena / (Spain) P. Martinez	2	2
Q	(Italy) C. Baldi / (Spain) M. Borrero	6	6
WC	(South Africa) L. Steenkamp / (South Africa) Z. Kruger	2	0
14	(Spain) L. Sainz / (Spain) S. Saiz	1	7	4
15	(Spain) J. Castelló / (Spain) M. Talavan	6	5	6
Bye
2	(Spain) B. González / (Spain) P. Josemaria

Round of 16
1	(Argentina) D. Brea / (Spain) G. Triay	6	6
13	(Italy) G. Dal Pozzo / (Spain) N. Rodriguez	3	3
22	(Spain) J.P. Bautista / (Spain) M. Lobo	1	4
6	(Argentina) C. Jensen / (Spain) T. Icardo	6	6
8	(Spain) A. Salazar / (Argentina) A. Osoro	6	6
12	(Argentina) M. Goyeneche / (Spain) R. Barrera	3	3
21	(Italy) G. Marchetti / (Spain) L. Arruabarrena	2	7	1
5	(Spain) M. Ortega / (Portugal) S. Araújo	6	6	6
4	(Spain) C. Fernández / (Spain) M. Calvo	6	7
20	(Argentina) J. Bidahorria / (Spain) M. Caparros	1	5
17	(Spain) J. Montes / (Spain) M. Barrera	6	6
11	(Spain) L. Rufo / (Spain) V. Iglesias	4	2
7	(Spain) A. Alonso / (Spain) M. Guinart	6	6
Q	(Italy) C. Baldi / (Spain) M. Borrero	1	2
15	(Spain) J. Castelló / (Spain) M. Talavan	6	2
2	(Spain) B. González / (Spain) P. Josemaria	7	6

Quarter-Final
1	(Argentina) D. Brea / (Spain) G. Triay	7	6
6	(Argentina) C. Jensen / (Spain) T. Icardo	6	4
8	(Spain) A. Salazar / (Argentina) A. Osoro	7	6
5	(Spain) M. Ortega / (Portugal) S. Araújo	6	2
4	(Spain) C. Fernández / (Spain) M. Calvo	6	6
17	(Spain) J. Montes / (Spain) M. Barrera	1	4
7	(Spain) A. Alonso / (Spain) M. Guinart	1	1
2	(Spain) B. González / (Spain) P. Josemaria	6	6

Semi-Finals
1	(Argentina) D. Brea / (Spain) G. Triay	6	6
8	(Spain) A. Salazar / (Argentina) A. Osoro	2	1
4	(Spain) C. Fernández / (Spain) M. Calvo	6	6
2	(Spain) B. González / (Spain) P. Josemaria	1	4

Finals
1	(Argentina) D. Brea / (Spain) G. Triay	6	6	7
4	(Spain) C. Fernández / (Spain) M. Calvo	2	7	6

== Results ==
=== First Round ===
Men's

Date	Winners	Score	Opponent	Refs.
27/7/2026	(Argentina) Gonzalo Alfonso (Argentina) Valentino Libaak	6–1 / 6–2	(South Africa) Egmond Van Heerden (South Africa) Jason Blakey Milner	
28/7/2026	(Spain) Marcel Font (Spain) Pablo Reina Ambel	6–4 / 6–1	(South Africa) Adam Van Harte (South Africa) Warren Kuhn	
28/7/2026	(United Arab Emirates) Ignacio Vilariño (Spain) Pincho Fernandez	4–6 / 6–2 / 6–3	(France) Timeo Fonteny (France) Yoan Boronad	
27/7/2026	(Spain) Enrique Goenaga (Spain) Manuel Castaño	7–5 / 7–6	(Spain) Alonso Rodriguez Martinez (Argentina) Juan De Pascual	
27/7/2026	(Spain) Guillermo Collado (Spain) Pol Hernandez	6–1 / 6–2	(South Africa) Luan Krige (South Africa) Richard Ashforth	
28/7/2026	(Argentina) Leonel Aguirre (Spain) Pablo Garcia Rodrigo	6–4 / 4–6 / 6–2	(Spain) Javier Martinez (Argentina) Ramiro Jesus Valenzuela	
28/7/2026	(Spain) Daniel Santigosa (Argentina) Maximiliano Sánchez Blasco	2–6 / 6–4 / 6–4	(United Arab Emirates) Arnau Ayats (Spain) Emilio Sánchez Chamero	
28/7/2026	(Spain) Francisco Manuel Gil (Spain) Pablo Lijó	6–3 / 6–2	(Spain) Anton Sans (Portugal) Gustavo Nunes	
28/7/2026	(Argentina) Federico Mourino (Spain) Marc Quilez	6–4 / 6–3	(Spain) Andres Fernández Lancha (Spain) Gonzalo Rubio	
28/7/2026	(Argentina) Ignacio Piotto (Spain) Juan Cruz Belluati	6–3 / 6–3	(Spain) Jordi Bataller (United Arab Emirates) Sergio Icardo	
27/7/2026	(Spain) David Gala Sánchez (Italy) Enzo Jensen	6–3 / 6–3	(Spain) Francisco Cabeza (Paraguay) Mariano Gonzalez San Martin	
28/7/2026	(Spain) Jose Garcia Diestro (Spain) Marc Sintes	6–2 / 6–3	(Spain) Pablo Vicente (France) Thomas Leygue	
27/7/2026	(Spain) Javier Ruiz (Spain) Santiago Pineda	6–3 / 6–2	(Spain) Álvaro Cepero (Spain) Teodoro Zapata	
28/7/2026	(Italy) Denis Perino (Italy) Facundo Dominguez	3–6 / 7–6 / 7–5	(Spain) Marcos Gonzalez Blanco (Paraguay) Martin Abud	
28/7/2026	(Spain) Mario Ortega (Spain) Victor Ruiz	6–4 / 6–4	(Argentina) Luciano Capra (Spain) Luis Hernandez Quesada	
27/7/2026	(Argentina) Juan Rubini (Argentina) Maxi Sánchez	6–4 / 6–4	(Portugal) Miguel Deus (Portugal) Nuno Deus	

=== Round of 32 ===
Men's

Date	Winners	Score	Opponent	Refs.
29/7/2026	(Argentina) Agustín Tapia (Spain) Arturo Coello	6–4 / 6–4	(Argentina) Gonzalo Alfonso (Argentina) Valentino Libaak	
29/7/2026	(Spain) Aimar Goñi (Spain) Eduardo Alonso	5–7 / 6–3 / 7–6	(Spain) Marcel Font (Spain) Pablo Reina Ambel	
29/7/2026	(Spain) Alex Arroyo (Spain) Jose Jimenez Casas	6–4 / 6–3	(United Arab Emirates) Ignacio Vilariño (Spain) Pincho Fernandez	
29/7/2026	(Spain) Enrique Goenaga (Spain) Manuel Castaño	7–6 / 6–7 / 6–4	(Spain) Coki Nieto (Spain) Jon Sanz	
29/7/2026	(Spain) Francisco Guerrero (Spain) Javi Leal	6–3 / 3–6 / 6–3	(Spain) Guillermo Collado (Spain) Pol Hernandez	
29/7/2026	(Argentina) Leonel Aguirre (Spain) Pablo Garcia Rodrigo	6–2 / 6–4	(Argentina) Alex Chozas (Spain) Javier Barahona	
29/7/2026	(United Arab Emirates) Inigo Jofre (Spain) Jairo Bautista	7–6 / 3–6 / 7–6	(Spain) Daniel Santigosa (Argentina) Maximiliano Sánchez Blasco	
29/7/2026	(Spain) Juan Lebrón (Argentina) Leandro Augsburger	6–4 / 6–3	(Spain) Francisco Manuel Gil (Spain) Pablo Lijó	
29/7/2026	(Italy) Alvaro Montiel Caruso (Italy) Flavio Abbate	6–3 / 6–4	(Argentina) Federico Mourino (Spain) Marc Quilez	
29/7/2026	(Spain) Juanlu Esbri (Argentina) Sanyo Gutiérrez	4–6 / 6–3 / 6–4	(Argentina) Ignacio Piotto (Spain) Juan Cruz Belluati	
29/7/2026	(Spain) Aléx Ruiz (Spain) Javier Garcia Mora	6–2 / 6–3	(Spain) David Gala Sánchez (Italy) Enzo Jensen	
29/7/2026	(Argentina) Martin Di Nenno (Spain) Paquito Navarro	6–2 / 6–1	(Spain) Jose Garcia Diestro (Spain) Marc Sintes	
29/7/2026	(Brazil) Lucas Campagnolo (Spain) Momo González	6–7 / 6–2 / 6–3	(Spain) Javier Ruiz (Spain) Santiago Pineda	
29/7/2026	(Argentina) Juan Tello (Argentina) Maximiliano Arce	6–4 / 6–3	(Italy) Denis Perino (Italy) Facundo Dominguez	
29/7/2026	(Spain) Javier Garrido (Brazil) Lucas Bergamini	6–2 / 6–1	(Spain) Mario Ortega (Spain) Victor Ruiz	
29/7/2026	(Spain) Alejandro Galán (Argentina) Federico Chingotto	6–2 / 7–6	(Argentina) Juan Rubini (Argentina) Maxi Sánchez	

Women's

Date	Winners	Score	Opponent	Refs.
28/7/2026	(Italy) Giulia Dal Pozzo (Spain) Nuria Rodriguez	6–3 / 6–4	(Spain) Maria Rodriguez Abajo (Spain) Noa Canovas	
29/7/2026	(Spain) Julia Polo Bautista (Spain) Marina Lobo	6–2 / 3–6 / 6–3	(Spain) Carla Fernández González (Spain) Nerea Santana	
29/7/2026	(Argentina) Claudia Jensen (Spain) Tamara Icardo	7–5 / 6–2	(Spain) Beatriz Caldera (Spain) Carmen Goenaga	
28/7/2026	(Spain) Alejandra Salazar (Argentina) Aranzazu Osoro	6–2 / 6–4	(France) Alix Collombon (Russia) Ksenia Sharifova	
28/7/2026	(Argentina) Martina Fassio Goyeneche (Spain) Raquel Eugenio Barrera	6–0 / 6–0	(South Africa) Simoné Roets (South Africa) Tamara Pieters	
28/7/2026	(Italy) Giorgia Marchetti (Spain) Lara Arruabarrena	6–4 / 7–6	(Spain) Aida Martinez (Spain) Natividad Lopez	
29/7/2026	(Argentina) Julieta Bidahorria (Spain) Marta Caparros	6–3 / 6–2	(Spain) Araceli Martinez (Spain) Laura Luján	
29/7/2026	(Spain) Jana Montes (Spain) Marta Barrera	6–3 / 6–7 / 7–6	(Spain) Barbara Las Heras (Russia) Daria Kucheriavaia	
28/7/2026	(Spain) Lorena Rufo (Spain) Victoria Iglesias	6–3 / 6–4	(Spain) Jimena Velasco (Spain) Veronica Virseda	
28/7/2026	(Spain) Alejandra Alonso (Spain) Marina Guinart	6–2 / 6–2	(Spain) Claudia Escacena (Spain) Patricia Fortun	
28/7/2026	(Italy) Caterina Baldi (Spain) Marta Borrero	6–2 / 6–0	(South Africa) Linge Steenkamp (South Africa) Zoe Kruger	
28/7/2026	(Spain) Jessica Castelló (Spain) Marta Talavan	6–1 / 5–7 / 6–4	(Spain) Lucía Sainz (Spain) Sofia Saiz	

=== Round of 16 ===
Men's

Date	Winners	Score	Opponent	Refs.
30/7/2026	(Argentina) Agustín Tapia (Spain) Arturo Coello	5–7 / 6–4 / 6–2	(Spain) Aimar Goñi (Spain) Eduardo Alonso	
30/7/2026	(Spain) Alex Arroyo (Spain) Jose Jimenez Casas	6–2 / 6–4	(Spain) Enrique Goenaga (Spain) Manuel Castaño	
30/7/2026	(Spain) Francisco Guerrero (Spain) Javi Leal	4–6 / 6–2 / 6–4	(Argentina) Leonel Aguirre (Spain) Pablo Garcia Rodrigo	
30/7/2026	(Spain) Juan Lebrón (Argentina) Leandro Augsburger	7–6 / 6–3	(United Arab Emirates) Inigo Jofre (Spain) Jairo Bautista	
30/7/2026	(Spain) Juanlu Esbri (Argentina) Sanyo Gutiérrez	6–1 / 6–4	(Italy) Alvaro Montiel Caruso (Italy) Flavio Abbate	
30/7/2026	(Spain) Aléx Ruiz (Spain) Javier Garcia Mora	6–7 / 6–4 / 6–3	(Argentina) Martin Di Nenno (Spain) Paquito Navarro	
30/7/2026	(Argentina) Juan Tello (Argentina) Maximiliano Arce	6–4 / 6–3	(Brazil) Lucas Campagnolo (Spain) Momo González	
30/7/2026	(Spain) Alejandro Galán (Argentina) Federico Chingotto	6–3 / 7–5	(Spain) Javier Garrido (Brazil) Lucas Bergamini	

Women's

Date	Winners	Score	Opponent	Refs.
30/7/2026	(Argentina) Delfina Brea (Spain) Gemma Triay	6–3 / 6–3	(Italy) Giulia Dal Pozzo (Spain) Nuria Rodriguez	
30/7/2026	(Argentina) Claudia Jensen (Spain) Tamara Icardo	6–1 / 6–4	(Spain) Julia Polo Bautista (Spain) Marina Lobo	
30/7/2026	(Spain) Alejandra Salazar (Argentina) Aranzazu Osoro	6–3 / 6–3	(Argentina) Martina Fassio Goyeneche (Spain) Raquel Eugenio Barrera	
30/7/2026	(Spain) Marta Ortega (Portugal) Sofia Araújo	6–2 / 6–7 / 6–1	(Italy) Giorgia Marchetti (Spain) Lara Arruabarrena	
30/7/2026	(Spain) Claudia Fernández (Spain) Martina Calvo	6–1 / 7–5	(Argentina) Julieta Bidahorria (Spain) Marta Caparros	
30/7/2026	(Spain) Jana Montes (Spain) Marta Barrera	6–4 / 6–2	(Spain) Lorena Rufo (Spain) Victoria Iglesias	
30/7/2026	(Spain) Alejandra Alonso (Spain) Marina Guinart	6–1 / 6–2	(Italy) Caterina Baldi (Spain) Marta Borrero	
30/7/2026	(Spain) Bea González (Spain) Paula Josemaría	7–6 / 6–2	(Spain) Jessica Castelló (Spain) Marta Talavan	

=== Quarter-Finals ===
Men's

Date	Winners	Score	Opponent	Refs.
31/7/2026	(Argentina) Agustín Tapia (Spain) Arturo Coello	7–6 / 6–2	(Spain) Alex Arroyo (Spain) Jose Jimenez Casas	
31/7/2026	(Spain) Francisco Guerrero (Spain) Javi Leal	6–7 / 7–5 / 7–6	(Spain) Juan Lebrón (Argentina) Leandro Augsburger	
31/7/2026	(Spain) Juanlu Esbri (Argentina) Sanyo Gutiérrez	6–0 / 6–3	(Spain) Aléx Ruiz (Spain) Javier Garcia Mora	
31/7/2026	(Spain) Alejandro Galán (Argentina) Federico Chingotto	6–3 / 1–6 / 6–2	(Argentina) Juan Tello (Argentina) Maximiliano Arce	

Women's

Date	Winners	Score	Opponent	Refs.
31/7/2026	(Argentina) Delfina Brea (Spain) Gemma Triay	7–6 / 6–4	(Argentina) Claudia Jensen (Spain) Tamara Icardo	
31/7/2026	(Spain) Alejandra Salazar (Argentina) Aranzazu Osoro	7–6 / 6–2	(Spain) Marta Ortega (Portugal) Sofia Araújo	
31/7/2026	(Spain) Claudia Fernández (Spain) Martina Calvo	6–1 / 6–4	(Spain) Jana Montes (Spain) Marta Barrera	
31/7/2026	(Spain) Bea González (Spain) Paula Josemaría	6–1 / 6–1	(Spain) Alejandra Alonso (Spain) Marina Guinart	

=== Semi-Finals ===
Men's

Date	Winners	Score	Opponent	Refs.
1/8/2026	(Spain) Francisco Guerrero (Spain) Javi Leal	7–5 / 7–5	(Argentina) Agustín Tapia (Spain) Arturo Coello	
1/8/2026	(Spain) Alejandro Galán (Argentina) Federico Chingotto	7–5 / 6–4	(Spain) Juanlu Esbri (Argentina) Sanyo Gutiérrez	

Women's

Date	Winners	Score	Opponent	Refs.
1/8/2026	(Argentina) Delfina Brea (Spain) Gemma Triay	6–2 / 6–2	(Spain) Alejandra Salazar (Argentina) Aranzazu Osoro	
1/8/2026	(Spain) Claudia Fernández (Spain) Martina Calvo	6–1 / 6–4	(Spain) Bea González (Spain) Paula Josemaría	

=== Finals ===
Men's

Date	Winners	Score	Opponent	Refs.
2/8/2026	(Spain) Alejandro Galán (Argentina) Federico Chingotto	6–2 / 5–7 / 7–6	(Spain) Francisco Guerrero (Spain) Javi Leal	

Women's

Date	Winners	Score	Opponent	Refs.
2/8/2026	(Argentina) Delfina Brea (Spain) Gemma Triay	6–2 / 6–7 / 7–6	(Spain) Claudia Fernández (Spain) Martina Calvo	
