= 2026 Miami P1 =

Premier Padel tournament held in Miami

- Date: 22 – 29 March
- Edition: 2nd
- Category: P1
- Prize money: €479.068
- Location: Miami, United States
- Venue: Miami Beach Convention Center
- Court speed: Slow

Champions
- Men's doubles: (Spain) Alejandro Galán (Argentina) Federico Chingotto
- Women's doubles: (Spain) Bea González (Spain) Paula Josemaría

Chronology

The 2026 Miami P1 (officially 2026 Premier Padel Miami P1) was the fourth tournament of the fifth season organized by Premier Padel, the premier padel circuit, promoted by the International Padel Federation, and with the financial backing of Nasser Al-Khelaïfi's Qatar Sports Investments.

In the women's category, the two highest-ranked pairs on the FIP rankings repited the Cancún final, facing each other for the second time this season. In the decisive match, Bea González and Paula Josemaría avenged their loss in Mexico by defeating Delfina Brea and Gemma Triay in three sets, securing their first title of the year and their first as a team.

In the men's category, the top two pairs in the FIP rankings faced each other once again in the final, with both reaching the championship match for the third time in 2026. In the final, Alejandro Galán and Federico Chingotto defeated the world number ones, Agustín Tapia and Arturo Coello, claiming their second title of 2026.

== Seeds ==
Male

Rnk.	Team	FIP Ranking Points
1	(Argentina) Agustín Tapia (Spain) Arturo Coello	40320
2	(Spain) Alejandro Galán (Argentina) Federico Chingotto	36320
3	(Argentina) Franco Stupaczuk (Spain) Mike Yanguas	13365
4	(Spain) Juan Lebrón (Argentina) Leandro Augsburguer	12250
5	(Spain) Coki Nieto (Spain) Jon Sanz	11357
6	(Spain) Francisco Guerrero (Spain) Paquito Navarro	11320
7	(Argentina) Martín Di Nenno (Spain) Momo González	9370
8	(Brazil) Lucas Bergamini (Spain) Javi Garrido	7555
9	(Spain) Javi Leal (Spain) Pablo Cardona	6736
10	(Spain) Eduardo Alonso (Argentina) Juan Tello	6470
11	(Spain) Javier Barahona (Spain) Javier Garcia Mora	5075
12	(Spain) Alejandro Ruiz (Spain) Juanlu Esbri	5025
13	(Spain) Jairo Bautista (Brazil) Lucas Campagnolo	4577
14	(Spain) Alejandro Arroyo (Argentina) Leonel Aguirre	4305
15	(Argentina) Gonzalo Alfonso (Argentina) Sanyo Gutiérrez	3948
16	(Argentina) Alex Chozas (Argentina) Valentino Libaak	3753

Female

Rnk.	Team	FIP Ranking Points
1	(Argentina) Delfina Brea (Spain) Gemma Triay	35400
2	(Spain) Bea González (Spain) Paula Josemaria	26430
3	(Spain) Ariana Sánchez (Spain) Andrea Ustero	22165
4	(Spain) Claudia Fernandéz (Portugal) Sofia Araújo	19425
5	(Argentina) Claudia Jensen (Spain) Tamara Icardo	11995
6	(Spain) Marta Ortega (Spain) Martina Calvo	10685
7	(Spain) Alejandra Alonso (Spain) Alejandra Salazar	10540
8	(Spain) Marina Guinart (Spain) Veronica Virseda	8200
9	(Spain) Beatriz Caldera (Spain) Carmen Goenaga	7210
10	(Argentina) Aranzazu Osoro (Spain) Victoria Iglesias	7110
11	(Spain) Lucía Sainz (Spain) Raquel Eugenio Barrera	5665
12	(Argentina) Martina Fassio Goyeneche (Spain) Patricia Llaguno	5415
13	(Spain) Jessica Castelló (Spain) Lorena Rufo	4440
14	(Spain) Jimena Velasco (Spain) Marta Barrera	4140
15	(Argentina) Julieta Bidahorria (Spain) Marta Caparros	3420
16	(Spain) Maria Rodriguez Abajo (Spain) Noa Canovas	3340

== Head-to-head record between teams ranked in the top 4 during the season ==
=== Man's ===
Record	Coello–Tapia	Galán–Chingotto	Stupaczuk–Yanguas	Augsburger–Lebrón
Coello–Tapia	—	1–2	1–0	3–0
Galán–Chingotto	2–1	—	1–0	—
Stupaczuk–Yanguas	0–1	0–1	—	—
Augsburger–Lebrón	0–3	—	—	—

=== Women's ===
Record	D. Brea–Triay	B. González–Paula	Ariana–Ustero	Araúijo–C. Fernandez
D. Brea–Triay	—	1–1	1–1	2–0
B. González–Paula	1–1	—	1–2	—
Ariana–Ustero	1–1	2–1	—	—
Araúijo–C. Fernandez	0–2	—	—	—

== Draws ==
=== Men's Bracket ===
Round of 32
1	(Spain) Coello / (Argentina) Tapia	6	6
30	(Argentina) E. Torre / (Spain) F. Cabeza	1	4
37	(Spain) D. Santigosa / (Spain) M. Sintes	2	5
14	(Spain) A. Arroyo / (Argentina) L. Aguirre	6	7
9	(Spain) J. Leal / (Spain) P. Cardona	3	7	2
22	(United Arab Emirates) I. Jofre / (Spain) M. Castaño	6	6	6
24	(Argentina) M. Arce / (Spain) P. Lijó	3	6
6	(Spain) F. Guerrero / (Spain) Paquito	6	7
5	(Spain) Coki / (Spain) J. Sanz	6	7
31	(Italy) E. Jensen / (Spain) L.H. Quesada	3	5
25	(Argentina) L. Capra / (Spain) V. Ruiz	5	4
15	(Argentina) G. Alfonso / (Argentina) Sanyo	7	6
10	(Spain) E. Alonso / (Argentina) J. Tello	2	4
17	(Spain) D.G. Sánchez / (Spain) P.G. Rodrigo	6	6
Q	(Argentina) A. Gutiérrez / (Spain) S. Oria
4	(Spain) Lebrón / (Argentina) L. Augsburger	6	7
3	(Argentina) Stupaczuk / (Spain) M. Yanguas	6	7
18	(Spain) G. Collado / (Spain) P.H. Alvarez	1	5
33	(Spain) Á. Cepero / (United Arab Emirates) A. Ayats	6	5	5
12	(Spain) A. Ruiz / (Spain) J. Esbri	4	7	7
13	(Spain) J. Bautista / (Brazil) L. Campagnolo	6	7
27	(Spain) J. Martinez / (Argentina) R. Valenzuela	0	6
32	(Italy) F. Dominguez / (Argentina) J.C. Belluati	2	6
7	(Argentina) Di Nenno / (Spain) Momo	6	7
8	(Spain) J. Garrido / (Brazil) L. Bergamini	4	1
36	(United Arab Emirates) I. Vilariño / (Spain) M. Del Castillo	6	6
Q	(Spain) A. Martinez / (Argentina) J. De Pascual
11	(Spain) J. Barahona / (Spain) J.G. Mora	7	7
16	(Argentina) A. Chozas / (Argentina) V. Libaak	6	6
20	(Spain) A.F. Lancha / (Spain) J.G. Diestro	4	2
34	(Spain) J. Gonzalez / (Spain) P. Fernandez	3	1
2	(Argentina) Chingotto / (Spain) Galán	6	6

Round of 16
1	(Spain) Coello / (Argentina) Tapia	7	6
14	(Spain) A. Arroyo / (Argentina) L. Aguirre	6	4
22	(United Arab Emirates) I. Jofre / (Spain) M. Castaño	1	3
6	(Spain) F. Guerrero / (Spain) Paquito	6	6
5	(Spain) Coki / (Spain) J. Sanz	6	6
15	(Argentina) G. Alfonso / (Argentina) Sanyo	0	2
17	(Spain) D.G. Sánchez / (Spain) P.G. Rodrigo	4	4
4	(Spain) Lebrón / (Argentina) L. Augsburger	6	6
3	(Argentina) Stupaczuk / (Spain) M. Yanguas	6	6
12	(Spain) A. Ruiz / (Spain) J. Esbri	3	4
13	(Spain) J. Bautista / (Brazil) L. Campagnolo	7	3	1
7	(Argentina) Di Nenno / (Spain) Momo	6	6	0
36	(United Arab Emirates) I. Vilariño / (Spain) M. Del Castillo	6	6	5
11	(Spain) J. Barahona / (Spain) J.G. Mora	3	7	7
16	(Argentina) A. Chozas / (Argentina) V. Libaak	1	6
2	(Argentina) Chingotto / (Spain) Galán	6	7

Quarter-Final
1	(Spain) Coello / (Argentina) Tapia	7	7
6	(Spain) F. Guerrero / (Spain) Paquito	5	6
5	(Spain) Coki / (Spain) J. Sanz	3	5
4	(Spain) Lebrón / (Argentina) L. Augsburger	6	7
3	(Argentina) Stupaczuk / (Spain) M. Yanguas	7	6
13	(Spain) J. Bautista / (Brazil) L. Campagnolo	6	4
11	(Spain) J. Barahona / (Spain) J.G. Mora	1	0
2	(Argentina) Chingotto / (Spain) Galán	6	6

Semi-Finals
1	(Spain) Coello / (Argentina) Tapia	5	6	6
4	(Spain) Lebrón / (Argentina) L. Augsburger	7	3	2
3	(Argentina) Stupaczuk / (Spain) M. Yanguas	2	2
2	(Argentina) Chingotto / (Spain) Galán	6	6

Finals
1	(Spain) Coello / (Argentina) Tapia	5	6	3
2	(Argentina) Chingotto / (Spain) Galán	7	3	6

=== Women's Bracket ===
Round of 32
1	(Argentina) D. Brea / (Spain) G. Triay
Bye
20	(France) A. Collombon / (Spain) J. Montes	1	6	3
11	(Spain) L. Sainz / (Spain) R. Barrera	6	2	6
12	(Argentina) M. Goyeneche / (Spain) P. Llaguno	6	6
Q	(Spain) A. Moral / (Spain) N. Aguilar	2	3
Q	(Spain) B. Las Heras / (Spain) J. Bautista	1	2
5	(Argentina) C. Jensen / (Spain) T. Icardo	6	6
6	(Spain) M. Ortega / (Spain) M. Calvo	6	6
Q	(Italy) G. Dal Pozzo / (Spain) N. Rodriguez	0	3
22	(Portugal) A. Nogueira / (Spain) L. Luján	7	4	2
14	(Spain) M. Barrera / (Spain) J. Velasco	6	6	6
18	(Spain) A. Perez / (Spain) L. Martinez	7	5	4
23	(Spain) M. Talavan / (Spain) S. Saiz	5	7	6
Bye
4	(Spain) C. Fernández / (Portugal) S. Araújo
3	(Spain) A. Ustero / (Spain) A. Sánchez
Bye
16	(Spain) M.R. Abajo / (Spain) N. Canovas	6	6
15	(Argentina) J. Bidahorria / (Spain) M. Caparros	4	4
10	(Argentina) A. Osoro / (Spain) V. Iglesias	6	3
9	(Spain) B. Caldera / (Spain) C. Goenaga	7	6
17	(Russia) K. Sharifova / (Spain) M. Borrero	3	3
7	(Spain) A. Salazar / (Spain) A. Alonso	6	6
8	(Spain) M. Guinart / (Spain) V. Virseda	6	6
WC	(United States) B. Dubins / (United States) M. Alonso	0	0
21	(Spain) L. Arruabarrena / (Spain) M. Lobo	5	0
13	(Spain) J. Castelló / (Spain) L. Rufo	7	1	*
19	(Spain) T. Navarro / (Argentina) V. Riera	4	6	6
Q	(Italy) G. Marchetti / (France) L. Godallier	6	4	3
Bye
2	(Spain) Bea González / (Spain) P. Josemaria

Round of 16
1	(Argentina) D. Brea / (Spain) G. Triay	7	6
11	(Spain) L. Sainz / (Spain) R. Barrera	6	0
12	(Argentina) M. Goyeneche / (Spain) P. Llaguno	0	2
5	(Argentina) C. Jensen / (Spain) T. Icardo	6	6
6	(Spain) M. Ortega / (Spain) M. Calvo	6	6
14	(Spain) M. Barrera / (Spain) J. Velasco	0	2
23	(Spain) M. Talavan / (Spain) S. Saiz	6	2
4	(Spain) C. Fernández / (Portugal) S. Araújo	7	6
3	(Spain) A. Ustero / (Spain) A. Sánchez	*
16	(Spain) M.R. Abajo / (Spain) N. Canovas
9	(Spain) B. Caldera / (Spain) C. Goenaga	7	6
7	(Spain) A. Salazar / (Spain) A. Alonso	6	2
8	(Spain) M. Guinart / (Spain) V. Virseda	7	6
13	(Spain) J. Castelló / (Spain) L. Rufo	5	4
19	(Spain) T. Navarro / (Argentina) V. Riera	2	2
2	(Spain) Bea González / (Spain) P. Josemaria	6	6

Quarter-Final
1	(Argentina) D. Brea / (Spain) G. Triay	6	6
5	(Argentina) C. Jensen / (Spain) T. Icardo	0	3
6	(Spain) M. Ortega / (Spain) M. Calvo	2	1
4	(Spain) C. Fernández / (Portugal) S. Araújo	6	6
3	(Spain) A. Ustero / (Spain) A. Sánchez	6	6
9	(Spain) B. Caldera / (Spain) C. Goenaga	3	3
8	(Spain) M. Guinart / (Spain) V. Virseda	3	5
2	(Spain) Bea González / (Spain) P. Josemaria	6	7

Semi-Finals
1	(Argentina) D. Brea / (Spain) G. Triay	6	6
4	(Spain) C. Fernández / (Portugal) S. Araújo	3	2
3	(Spain) A. Ustero / (Spain) A. Sánchez	6	4	4
2	(Spain) Bea González / (Spain) P. Josemaria	4	6	6

Finals
1	(Argentina) D. Brea / (Spain) G. Triay	3	6	5
2	(Spain) Bea González / (Spain) P. Josemaria	6	4	7

== Results ==
=== First Round ===
Men's

Date	Winners	Score	Opponent	Refs.
24/3/2026	(Argentina) Eduardo Agustin Torre (Spain) Francisco Cabeza	6–3 / 6–2	(Argentina) Federico Mouriño (Spain) Marc Quilez	
23/3/2026	(Spain) Daniel Santigosa (Spain) Marc Sintes	6–3 / 6–3	(Italy) Denis Perino (Argentina) Ignacio Piotto	
23/3/2026	(United Arab Emirates) Iñigo Jofre (Spain) Manuel Castaño	6–4 / 6–4	(Spain) Francisco Gil Morales (Argentina) Maxi Sánchez	
24/3/2026	(Argentina) Maximiliano Arce (Spain) Pablo Lijó	7–5 / 7–6	(Spain) Aimar Goñi (Spain) Enrique Goenaga	
23/3/2026	(Italy) Enzo Jensen (Spain) Luis Hernandez Quesada	6–1 / 6–3	(United States) Aaron Segura (United States) Matias Segura	
23/3/2026	(Argentina) Luciano Capra (Spain) Victor Ruiz	6–3 / 6–7 / 6–4	(Spain) Gonzalo Rubio (Spain) Javi Ruiz	
24/3/2026	(Spain) David Gala Sánchez (Spain) Pablo García Rodrigo	6–2 / 6–3	(Spain) Álvaro Melendez Amaya (Spain) Pedro Melendez Amaya	
24/3/2026	(Argentina) Agustin Gutiérrez (Spain) Salvador Oria	6–4 / 1–6 / 6–4	(Italy) Alvaro Montiel Caruso (Italy) Flavio Abbate	
24/3/2026	(Spain) Guillermo Collado (Spain) Pol Hernandez	6–2 / 6–3	(United States) Chris Humphreys Chris (United States) Felipe Osses Konig	
23/3/2026	(Spain) Álvaro Cepero (United Arab Emirates) Arnau Ayats	6–1 / 6–4	(Spain) Ignacio Sager (Argentina) Juan Ignacio Rubini	
23/3/2026	(Spain) Javier Martinez (Argentina) Ramiro Jesus Valenzuela	7–6 / 6–2	(Portugal) Nuno Deus (France) Thomas Leygue	
24/3/2026	(Italy) Facundo Dominguez (Argentina) Juan Cruz Belluati	2–6 / 6–3 / 6–4	(Italy) Aris Patiniotis (Sweden) Adam Axelsson	
24/3/2026	(United Arab Emirates) Ignacio Vilariño (Spain) Mario Del Castillo	7–6 / 4–6 / 6–1	(Chile) Javier Valdes (Argentina) Renzo Gabriel Nuñez	
24/3/2026	(Spain) Alonso Rodriguez (Argentina) Juan De Pascual	6–0 / 6–0	(France) Bastien Blanque (France) Dylan Guichard	
23/3/2026	(Spain) Andres Fernandez Lancha (Spain) Jose García Diestro	6–2 / 2–6 / 7–6	(Spain) Jose Jimenez Casas (Argentina) Maxi Sanchez Blasco	
23/3/2026	(Spain) Jose Luis Gonzalez (Spain) Pincho Fernandez	7–5 / 6–3	(United States) Nicholas Agritelley (United States) Vinny Di Francesco	

=== Round of 32 ===
Men's

Date	Winners	Score	Opponent	Refs.
25/3/2026	(Argentina) Agustín Tapia (Spain) Arturo Coello	6–1 / 6–4	(Argentina) Eduardo Agustin Torre (Spain) Francisco Cabeza	
25/3/2026	(Spain) Alex Arroyo (Argentina) Leonel Aguirre	6–2 / 7–5	(Spain) Daniel Santigosa (Spain) Marc Sintes	
25/3/2026	(United Arab Emirates) Iñigo Jofre (Spain) Manuel Castaño	6–3 / 6–7 / 6–2	(Spain) Javi Leal (Spain) Pablo Cardona	
25/3/2026	(Spain) Francisco Guerrero (Spain) Paquito Navarro	6–3 / 7–6	(Argentina) Maximiliano Arce (Spain) Pablo Lijó	
25/3/2026	(Spain) Coki Nieto (Spain) Jon Sanz	6–3 / 7–5	(Italy) Enzo Jensen (Spain) Luis Hernandez Quesada	
25/3/2026	(Argentina) Gonzalo Alfonso (Argentina) Sanyo Gutiérrez	7–5 / 6–4	(Argentina) Luciano Capra (Spain) Victor Ruiz	
25/3/2026	(Spain) David Gala Sánchez (Spain) Pablo García Rodrigo	6–2 / 6–4	(Spain) Eduardo Alonso (Argentina) Juan Tello	
25/3/2026	(Spain) Juan Lebrón (Argentina) Leandro Augsburger	6–3 / 7–6	(Argentina) Agustin Gutiérrez (Spain) Salvador Oria	
25/3/2026	(Argentina) Franco Stupaczuk (Spain) Miguel Yanguas	6–1 / 7–5	(Spain) Guillermo Collado (Spain) Pol Hernandez	
25/3/2026	(Spain) Aléx Ruiz (Spain) Juanlu Esbri	4–6 / 7–5 / 7–5	(Spain) Álvaro Cepero (United Arab Emirates) Arnau Ayats	
25/3/2026	(Spain) Jairo Bautista (Brazil) Lucas Campagnolo	6–0 / 7–6	(Spain) Javier Martinez (Argentina) Ramiro Jesus Valenzuela	
25/3/2026	(Argentina) Martin Di Nenno (Spain) Momo González	6–2 / 7–6	(Italy) Facundo Dominguez (Argentina) Juan Cruz Belluati	
25/3/2026	(United Arab Emirates) Ignacio Vilariño (Spain) Mario Del Castillo	6–4 / 6–1	(Spain) Javier Garrido (Brazil) Lucas Bergamini	
25/3/2026	(Spain) Javier Barahona (Spain) Javier Garcia Mora	7–6 / 7–6	(Spain) Alonso Rodriguez (Argentina) Juan De Pascual	
25/3/2026	(Argentina) Alex Chozas (Argentina) Valentino Libaak	6–4 / 6–2	(Spain) Andres Fernandez Lancha (Spain) Jose García Diestro	
25/3/2026	(Spain) Alejandro Galán (Argentina) Federico Chingotto	6–3 / 6–1	(Spain) Jose Luis Gonzalez (Spain) Pincho Fernandez	

Women's

Date	Winners	Score	Opponent	Refs.
24/3/2026	(Spain) Lucía Sainz (Spain) Raquel Eugenio Barrera	6–1 / 2–6 / 6–3	(France) Alix Collombon (Spain) Jana Montes	
24/3/2026	(Argentina) Martina Fassio Goyeneche (Spain) Patricia Llaguno	6–2 / 6–3	(Spain) Amanda Lopez Moral (Spain) Noemi Aguilar	
24/3/2026	(Argentina) Claudia Jensen (Spain) Tamara Icardo	6–1 / 6–2	(Spain) Barbara Las Heras (Spain) Julia Polo Bautista	
24/3/2026	(Spain) Marta Ortega (Spain) Martina Calvo	6–0 / 6–3	(Italy) Giulia Dal Pozzo (Spain) Nuria Rodriguez	
24/3/2026	(Spain) Jimena Velasco (Spain) Marta Barrera	6–7 / 6–4 / 6–2	(Portugal) Ana Catarina Nogueira (Spain) Laura Luján	
24/3/2026	(Spain) Marta Talavan (Spain) Sofía Saiz Vallejo	5–7 / 7–5 / 6–4	(Spain) Agueda Perez (Spain) Lucia Martinez	
24/3/2026	(Spain) Laia Rodriguez Abajo (Spain) Noa Canovas	6–4 / 6–4	(Argentina) Julieta Bidahorria (Spain) Marta Caparros	
25/3/2026	(Spain) Beatriz Caldera (Spain) Carmen Goenaga	7–6 / 6–3	(Argentina) Aranzazu Osoro (Spain) Victoria Iglesias	
24/3/2026	(Spain) Alejandra Alonso (Spain) Alejandra Salazar	6–3 / 6–3	(Russia) Ksenia Sharifova (Spain) Marta Borrero	
25/3/2026	(Spain) Marina Guinart (Spain) Verónica Virseda	6–0 / 6–0	(United States) Brittany Dubins (United States) Marta Morga Alonso	
24/3/2026	(Spain) Jessica Castelló (Spain) Lorena Rufo	7–5 / 1–0 / W.O.	(Spain) Lara Arruabarrena (Spain) Marina Lobo	
24/3/2026	(Spain) Teresa Navarro (Argentina) Virginia Riera	4–6 / 6–4 / 6–3	(Italy) Giorgia Marchetti (France) Lea Godallier	

=== Round of 16 ===
Men's

Date	Winners	Score	Opponent	Refs.
26/3/2026	(Argentina) Agustín Tapia (Spain) Arturo Coello	7–6 / 6–4	(Spain) Alex Arroyo (Argentina) Leonel Aguirre	
26/3/2026	(Spain) Francisco Guerrero (Spain) Paquito Navarro	6–1 / 6–3	(United Arab Emirates) Iñigo Jofre (Spain) Manuel Castaño	
26/3/2026	(Spain) Coki Nieto (Spain) Jon Sanz	6–0 / 6–2	(Argentina) Gonzalo Alfonso (Argentina) Sanyo Gutiérrez	
26/3/2026	(Spain) Juan Lebrón (Argentina) Leandro Augsburger	6–4 / 6–4	(Spain) David Gala Sánchez (Spain) Pablo García Rodrigo	
26/3/2026	(Argentina) Franco Stupaczuk (Spain) Miguel Yanguas	6–3 / 6–4	(Spain) Aléx Ruiz (Spain) Juanlu Esbri	
26/3/2026	(Argentina) Martin Di Nenno (Spain) Momo González	6–7 / 6–3 / 0–1 / W.O.	(Spain) Jairo Bautista (Brazil) Lucas Campagnolo	
26/3/2026	(Spain) Javier Barahona (Spain) Javier Garcia Mora	3–6 / 7–6 / 7–5	(United Arab Emirates) Ignacio Vilariño (Spain) Mario Del Castillo	
26/3/2026	(Spain) Alejandro Galán (Argentina) Federico Chingotto	6–1 / 7–6	(Argentina) Alex Chozas (Argentina) Valentino Libaak	

Women's

Date	Winners	Score	Opponent	Refs.
26/3/2026	(Argentina) Delfina Brea (Spain) Gemma Triay	7–6 / 6–0	(Spain) Lucía Sainz (Spain) Raquel Eugenio Barrera	
26/3/2026	(Argentina) Claudia Jensen (Spain) Tamara Icardo	6–0 / 6–2	(Argentina) Martina Fassio Goyeneche (Spain) Patricia Llaguno	
26/3/2026	(Spain) Marta Ortega (Spain) Martina Calvo	6–0 / 6–2	(Spain) Jimena Velasco (Spain) Marta Barrera	
26/3/2026	(Spain) Claudia Fernández (Portugal) Sofia Araújo	7–6 / 6–2	(Spain) Marta Talavan (Spain) Sofía Saiz Vallejo	
26/3/2026	(Spain) Andrea Ustero (Spain) Ariana Sánchez	W.O.	(Spain) Laia Rodriguez Abajo (Spain) Noa Canovas	
26/3/2026	(Spain) Beatriz Caldera (Spain) Carmen Goenaga	7–6 / 6–2	(Spain) Alejandra Alonso (Spain) Alejandra Salazar	
26/3/2026	(Spain) Marina Guinart (Spain) Verónica Virseda	7–5 / 6–4	(Spain) Jessica Castelló (Spain) Lorena Rufo	
26/3/2026	(Spain) Bea González (Spain) Paula Josemaría	6–2 / 6–2	(Spain) Teresa Navarro (Argentina) Virginia Riera	

=== Quarter-Finals ===
Men's

Date	Winners	Score	Opponent	Refs.
27/3/2026	(Argentina) Agustín Tapia (Spain) Arturo Coello	7–5 / 7–6	(Spain) Francisco Guerrero (Spain) Paquito Navarro	
27/3/2026	(Spain) Juan Lebrón (Argentina) Leandro Augsburger	6–3 / 7–5	(Spain) Coki Nieto (Spain) Jon Sanz	
27/3/2026	(Argentina) Franco Stupaczuk (Spain) Miguel Yanguas	7–6 / 6–4	(Argentina) Martin Di Nenno (Spain) Momo González	
27/3/2026	(Spain) Alejandro Galán (Argentina) Federico Chingotto	6–1 / 6–0	(Spain) Javier Barahona (Spain) Javier Garcia Mora	

Women's

Date	Winners	Score	Opponent	Refs.
27/3/2026	(Argentina) Delfina Brea (Spain) Gemma Triay	6–0 / 6–3	(Argentina) Claudia Jensen (Spain) Tamara Icardo	
27/3/2026	(Spain) Claudia Fernández (Portugal) Sofia Araújo	6–2 / 6–1	(Spain) Marta Ortega (Spain) Martina Calvo	
27/3/2026	(Spain) Andrea Ustero (Spain) Ariana Sánchez	6–3 / 6–3	(Spain) Beatriz Caldera (Spain) Carmen Goenaga	
27/3/2026	(Spain) Bea González (Spain) Paula Josemaría	6–3 / 7–5	(Spain) Marina Guinart (Spain) Verónica Virseda	

=== Semi-Finals ===
Men's

Date	Winners	Score	Opponent	Refs.
28/3/2026	(Argentina) Agustín Tapia (Spain) Arturo Coello	5–7 / 6–3 / 6–2	(Spain) Juan Lebrón (Argentina) Leandro Augsburger	
28/3/2026	(Spain) Alejandro Galán (Argentina) Federico Chingotto	6–2 / 6–2	(Argentina) Franco Stupaczuk (Spain) Miguel Yanguas	

Women's

Date	Winners	Score	Opponent	Refs.
28/3/2026	(Argentina) Delfina Brea (Spain) Gemma Triay	6–3 / 6–2	(Spain) Claudia Fernández (Portugal) Sofia Araújo	
28/3/2026	(Spain) Bea González (Spain) Paula Josemaría	4–6 / 6–4 / 6–4	(Spain) Andrea Ustero (Spain) Ariana Sánchez	

=== Finals ===
Men's

Date	Winners	Score	Opponent	Refs.
29/3/2026	(Spain) Alejandro Galán (Argentina) Federico Chingotto	7–5 / 3–6 / 6–3	(Argentina) Agustín Tapia (Spain) Arturo Coello	

Women's

Date	Winners	Score	Opponent	Refs.
29/3/2026	(Spain) Bea González (Spain) Paula Josemaría	6–3 / 4–6 / 7–5	(Argentina) Delfina Brea (Spain) Gemma Triay	
