= 2026 Madrid P1 =

Premier Padel tournament held in Madrid

- Date: 29 August – 6 September
- Edition: 1st
- Category: P1
- Prize money: €479.068
- Location: Madrid, Spain
- Venue: Movistar Arena
- Court speed: Medium-Fast

Champions
- Men's doubles: (Spain) Alejandro Galán (Argentina) Federico Chingotto
- Women's doubles: (Argentina) Delfina Brea (Spain) Gemma Triay

Chronology

The 2026 Madrid P1 (officially 2026 Premier Padel Oysho Comunidad de Madrid P1) was the sixteenth tournament of the fifth season organized by Premier Padel, the premier padel circuit, promoted by the International Padel Federation, and with the financial backing of Nasser Al-Khelaïfi's Qatar Sports Investments.

In the women's category, the top two seeded pairs from the FIP rankings both reached the final for the eighth time this season. In the title match, Delfina Brea and Gemma Triay, the world number ones, defeated Bea González and Paula Josemaría to claim their sixth title of 2026 and their first as a team in Madrid (marking a second victory there for each individually, following Delfina's win in 2023 and Gemma's in 2024).

In the men's category, for the second time in 2026, the top-ranked FIP pair, Agustín Tapia and Arturo Coello, failed to reach the final, losing in the quarterfinals to Coki Nieto and Mike Yanguas. In the final, Alejandro Galán and Federico Chingotto defeated Coki and Yanguas in three sets, claiming their seventh title of 2026 and their first as a pair in Madrid (Galán's second win there, having won the inaugural edition in 2022).

== Relevant Data ==
=== New partnerships ===
Following the split of the pairs ranked 4th and 6th, Mike Yanguas joined forces with Coki Nieto, who had ended his partnership with Jon Sanz. Meanwhile, Franco Stupaczuk teamed up with Nieto's former partner, Jon Sanz, entering the tournament as the fourth-ranked pair.

=== Coki and Yanguas eliminate Coello and Tapia ===
With their quarterfinal elimination at the hands of Coki Nieto and Mike Yanguas, world number ones Agustín Tapia and Arturo Coello have for the first time in 18 months been knocked out before the semi-finals.

== Seeds ==
Male

Rnk.	Team	FIP Ranking Points
1	(Argentina) Agustín Tapia (Spain) Arturo Coello	41960
2	(Spain) Alejandro Galán (Argentina) Federico Chingotto	35640
3	(Spain) Juan Lebrón (Argentina) Leandro Augsburguer	16000
4	(Argentina) Franco Stupaczuk (Spain) Jon Sanz	11650
5	(Spain) Coki Nieto (Spain) Mike Yanguas	11595
6	(Argentina) Martín Di Nenno (Spain) Paquito Navarro	11180
7	(Spain) Francisco Guerrero (Spain) Javi Leal	8665
8	(Brazil) Lucas Campagnolo (Spain) Momo González	7630
9	(Spain) Javier Garrido (Brazil) Lucas Bergamini	6510
10	(Argentina) Juan Tello (Argentina) Maximiliano Arce	5575
11	(Spain) Alejandro Ruiz (Spain) Javier Garcia Mora	5245
12	(Spain) Aimar Goñi (Spain) Eduardo Alonso	5187
13	(Spain) Juanlu Esbri (Argentina) Sanyo Gutiérrez	5055
14	(Spain) Alejandro Arroyo (Spain) Jose Jimenez Casas	4460
15	(United Arab Emirates) Inigo Jofre (Spain) Jairo Bautista	4430
16	(Spain) Javier Barahona (Argentina) Maximiliano Sánchez Blasco	3915

Female

Rnk.	Team	FIP Ranking Points
1	(Argentina) Delfina Brea (Spain) Gemma Triay	36280
2	(Spain) Bea González (Spain) Paula Josemaria	28520
3	(Spain) Ariana Sánchez (Spain) Andrea Ustero	22010
4	(Spain) Claudia Fernandéz (Spain) Martina Calvo	18210
5	(Spain) Marta Ortega (Portugal) Sofia Araújo	12820
6	(Argentina) Claudia Jensen (Spain) Tamara Icardo	12285
7	(Spain) Alejandra Alonso (Spain) Marina Guinart	8820
8	(Spain) Alejandra Salazar (Argentina) Aranzazu Osoro	8010
9	(Argentina) Martina Fassio Goyeneche (Spain) Veronica Virseda	6880
10	(Spain) Beatriz Caldera (Spain) Carmen Goenaga	6550
11	(Spain) Lorena Rufo (Spain) Victoria Iglesias	4820
12	(Spain) Jimena Velasco (Spain) Raquel Eugenio Barrera	4805
13	(Italy) Carolina Orsi (Spain) Patricia Llaguno	4770
14	(Italy) Giulia Dal Pozzo (Spain) Nuria Rodriguez	4635
15	(Spain) Jana Montes (Spain) Marta Barrera	3900
16	(Spain) Lucía Sainz (Spain) Sofia Saiz	3830

== Head-to-head record between teams ranked in the top 4 during the season ==
=== Men's ===
Record	Coello–Tapia	Galán–Chingotto	Augsburger–Lebrón	Sanz–Stupaczuk	Former Pairs	Stupaczuk–Yanguas
Coello–Tapia	—	6–4	6–1	—		5–0
Galán–Chingotto	4–6	—	4–2	—		3–0
Augsburger–Lebrón	1–6	2–4	—	—		—
Sanz–Stupaczuk	—	—	—	—		—
Former Pairs						
Stupaczuk–Yanguas	0–5	0–3	—	—		—

=== Women's ===
Record	D. Brea–Triay	B. González–Paula	Ariana–Ustero	C. Fernández–M. Calvo	Former Pairs	Araúijo–C. Fernández
D. Brea–Triay	—	3–5	6–3	1–1		3–0
B. González–Paula	5–3	—	4–3	1–2		2–0
Ariana–Ustero	3–6	3–4	—	—		1–0
C. Fernández–M. Calvo	1–1	2–1	—	—		—
Former Pairs
Araúijo–C. Fernández	0–3	0–2	0–1	—		—

== Draws ==
=== Men's Bracket ===
Round of 32
1	(Spain) Coello / (Argentina) Tapia	6	6
35	(Argentina) F. Mouriño / (Spain) M. Quilez	0	1
Q	(Belgium) C. Geens / (France) T. Leygue	5	3
10	(Argentina) J. Tello / (Argentina) M. Arce	7	6
11	(Spain) Á. Ruiz / (Spain) J.G. Mora	6	6
31	(Portugal) M. Deus / (Portugal) N. Deus	4	4
28	(Argentina) I. Piotto / (Argentina) J. Rubini	4	3
5	(Spain) Coki / (Spain) M. Yanguas
7	(Spain) F. Guerrero / (Spain) J. Leal	6	6	6
30	(Spain) A. Rodriguez / (Italy) F. Abbate	2	7	7
Q	(Spain) J. Marmolejo / (Argentina) R. Pereyra	3	6	6
12	(Spain) A. Goñi / (Spain) E. Alonso	6	3	4
9	(Spain) J. Garrido / (Brazil) L. Bergamini	3	6
17	(Argentina) G. Alfonso / (Argentina) V. Libaak	6	7
24	(Spain) J. Martinez / (Spain) L.H. Quesada	3	3
3	(Spain) Lebrón / (Argentina) L. Augsburger	6	6
4	(Argentina) F. Stupaczuk / (Spain) J. Sanz	6	6
26	(Spain) F. Cabeza / (Paraguay) M. San Martin	4	3
Q	(Argentina) F. Lopez / (Spain) F. Dal Bianco	5	3
14	(Spain) A. Arroyo / (Spain) J.J. Casas	7	6
15	(United Arab Emirates) I. Jofre / (Spain) J. Bautista	6	6	7
Q	(Spain) Á. Amaya / (Spain) J.L. Gonzalez	1	7	6
32	(Spain) A.F. Lancha / (Italy) D. Perino	4	3
8	(Brazil) L. Campagnolo / (Spain) Momo	6	6
6	(Argentina) Di Nenno / (Spain) Paquito	6	6
WC	(Spain) A.M. Lopez / (Spain) J. Collantes	1	2
22	(Spain) J.G. Diestro / (Spain) M. Sintes	6	6
16	(Spain) J. Barahona / (Argentina) M. Blasco	7	7
13	(Spain) J. Esbri / (Argentina) Sanyo	6	3	6
25	(Italy) A. Montiel / (Spain) G. Rubio	3	6	3
Q	(Italy) A. Patiniotis / (Spain) D. Garcia	2	4
2	(Argentina) Chingotto / (Spain) Galán	6	6

Round of 16
1	(Spain) Coello / (Argentina) Tapia	7	6
10	(Argentina) J. Tello / (Argentina) M. Arce	6	3
11	(Spain) Á. Ruiz / (Spain) J.G. Mora	2	1
5	(Spain) Coki / (Spain) M. Yanguas	6	6
30	(Spain) A. Rodriguez / (Italy) F. Abbate	6	6
Q	(Spain) J. Marmolejo / (Argentina) R. Pereyra	3	4
17	(Argentina) G. Alfonso / (Argentina) V. Libaak	7	7
3	(Spain) Lebrón / (Argentina) L. Augsburger	6	5
4	(Argentina) F. Stupaczuk / (Spain) J. Sanz	6	4
14	(Spain) A. Arroyo / (Spain) J.J. Casas	7	6
15	(United Arab Emirates) I. Jofre / (Spain) J. Bautista	7	6
8	(Brazil) L. Campagnolo / (Spain) Momo	5	3
6	(Argentina) Di Nenno / (Spain) Paquito	6	6
16	(Spain) J. Barahona / (Argentina) M. Blasco	4	2
13	(Spain) J. Esbri / (Argentina) Sanyo	4	0
2	(Argentina) Chingotto / (Spain) Galán	6	6

Quarter-Final
1	(Spain) Coello / (Argentina) Tapia	5	6
5	(Spain) Coki / (Spain) M. Yanguas	7	7
30	(Spain) A. Rodriguez / (Italy) F. Abbate	6	6	4
17	(Argentina) G. Alfonso / (Argentina) V. Libaak	4	7	6
14	(Spain) A. Arroyo / (Spain) J.J. Casas	2	7	3
15	(United Arab Emirates) I. Jofre / (Spain) J. Bautista	6	6	6
6	(Argentina) Di Nenno / (Spain) Paquito	6	3	6
2	(Argentina) Chingotto / (Spain) Galán	4	6	7

Semi-Finals
5	(Spain) Coki / (Spain) M. Yanguas	6	7
17	(Argentina) G. Alfonso / (Argentina) V. Libaak	4	6
15	(United Arab Emirates) I. Jofre / (Spain) J. Bautista	3	4
2	(Argentina) Chingotto / (Spain) Galán	6	6

Finals
5	(Spain) Coki / (Spain) M. Yanguas	4	7	4
2	(Argentina) Chingotto / (Spain) Galán	6	5	6

=== Women's Bracket ===
Round of 32
1	(Argentina) D. Brea / (Spain) G. Triay
Bye
9	(Argentina) M. Goyeneche / (Spain) V. Virseda	2	1
14	(Italy) G. Dal Pozzo / (Spain) N. Rodriguez	6	6
11	(Spain) L. Rufo / (Spain) V. Iglesias	6	5	6
16	(Spain) L. Sainz / (Spain) S. Saiz	3	7	2
21	(Spain) L. Manquillo / (Spain) L. Martinez	3	6	3
8	(Spain) A. Salazar / (Argentina) A. Osoro	6	3	6
6	(Argentina) C. Jensen / (Spain) T. Icardo	6	6
23	(Spain) A. Perez / (Spain) M. Caparros	1	0
18	(Spain) M.R. Abajo / (Spain) N. Canovas	6	7
Q	(Spain) C. Escacena / (Spain) N. Aguilar	3	6
12	(Spain) J. Velasco / (Spain) R. Barrera	4	0
13	(Italy) C. Orsi / (Spain) P. Llaguno	6	6
Bye
3	(Spain) A. Ustero / (Spain) A. Sánchez
4	(Spain) C. Fernández / (Spain) M. Calvo
Bye
17	(Spain) J. Castelló / (Spain) M. Talavan	6	6	6
20	(Argentina) J. Bidahorria / (Argentina) V. Riera	2	7	2
15	(Spain) J. Montes / (Spain) M. Barrera	6	6
WC	(Spain) M. Lobo / (Spain) M. Arellano	2	1
Q	(Spain) A. Moral / (Spain) C. Goyeneche	3	4
7	(Spain) A. Alonso / (Spain) M. Guinart	6	6
5	(Spain) M. Ortega / (Portugal) S. Araújo	6	6
22	(Spain) A. Martinez / (Spain) L. Luján	1	2
10	(Spain) B. Caldera / (Spain) C. Goenaga	6	6
Q	(Argentina) D. Valenzuela / (France) L. Godallier	2	1
19	(France) A. Collombon / (Russia) K. Sharifova	6	6
Q	(Spain) B. Las Heras / (Spain) C. Mesa	3	0
Bye
2	(Spain) B. González / (Spain) P. Josemaria

Round of 16
1	(Argentina) D. Brea / (Spain) G. Triay	6	6
14	(Italy) G. Dal Pozzo / (Spain) N. Rodriguez	3	1
11	(Spain) L. Rufo / (Spain) V. Iglesias	6	7	2
8	(Spain) A. Salazar / (Argentina) A. Osoro	7	6	6
6	(Argentina) C. Jensen / (Spain) T. Icardo	6	6
18	(Spain) M.R. Abajo / (Spain) N. Canovas	1	3
13	(Italy) C. Orsi / (Spain) P. Llaguno	0	7	2
3	(Spain) A. Ustero / (Spain) A. Sánchez	6	6	6
4	(Spain) C. Fernández / (Spain) M. Calvo	6	6
17	(Spain) J. Castelló / (Spain) M. Talavan	4	4
15	(Spain) J. Montes / (Spain) M. Barrera	4	0
7	(Spain) A. Alonso / (Spain) M. Guinart	6	6
5	(Spain) M. Ortega / (Portugal) S. Araújo	6	3	6
10	(Spain) B. Caldera / (Spain) C. Goenaga	3	6	4
19	(France) A. Collombon / (Russia) K. Sharifova	2	1
2	(Spain) B. González / (Spain) P. Josemaria	6	6

Quarter-Final
1	(Argentina) D. Brea / (Spain) G. Triay	6	6
8	(Spain) A. Salazar / (Argentina) A. Osoro	3	3
6	(Argentina) C. Jensen / (Spain) T. Icardo	7	1	3
3	(Spain) A. Ustero / (Spain) A. Sánchez	6	6	6
4	(Spain) C. Fernández / (Spain) M. Calvo	7	6
7	(Spain) A. Alonso / (Spain) M. Guinart	6	2
5	(Spain) M. Ortega / (Portugal) S. Araújo	0	2
2	(Spain) B. González / (Spain) P. Josemaria	6	6

Semi-Finals
1	(Argentina) D. Brea / (Spain) G. Triay	6	6
3	(Spain) A. Ustero / (Spain) A. Sánchez	2	4
4	(Spain) C. Fernández / (Spain) M. Calvo	4	6	5
2	(Spain) B. González / (Spain) P. Josemaria	6	2	7

Finals
1	(Argentina) D. Brea / (Spain) G. Triay	6	6	6
2	(Spain) B. González / (Spain) P. Josemaria	7	3	3

== Results ==
=== First Round ===
Men's

Date	Winners	Score	Opponent	Refs.
1/9/2026	(Argentina) Federico Mourino (Spain) Marc Quilez	3–6 / 6–3 / 6–4	(Spain) Javier Ruiz (Spain) Santiago Pineda	
1/9/2026	(Belgium) Clement Geens (France) Dylan Guichard	7–6 / 7–6	(Spain) Mario Ortega (Spain) Victor Ruiz	
1/9/2026	(Portugal) Miguel Deus (Portugal) Nuno Deus	6–0 / 6–7 / 7–6	(Spain) Carlos Del Pico Torres (Spain) Hugo Garcia Martinez	
1/9/2026	(Argentina) Ignacio Piotto (Argentina) Juan Ignacio Rubini	7–6 / 3–6 / 7–6	(United Arab Emirates) Arnau Ayats (Spain) Emilio Sánchez Chamero	
1/9/2026	(Spain) Alonso Rodriguez Martinez (Italy) Flavio Abbate	6–7 / 6–1 / 6–1	(Spain) Francisco Manuel Gil (Spain) Pablo Lijó	
1/9/2026	(Spain) Jose Solano Marmolejo (Argentina) Ramiro Pereyra	6–3 / 7–6	(Argentina) Lucho Capra (Argentina) Maxi Sánchez	
1/9/2026	(Argentina) Gonzalo Alfonso (Argentina) Valentino Libaak	6–3 / 6–4	(Spain) Guillermo Collado (Spain) Pol Hernandez Alvarez	
1/9/2026	(Spain) Javier Martinez (Spain) Luis Hernandez Quesada	4–6 / 7–5 / 6–3	(Spain) Marcos Gonzalez Blanco (Paraguay) Martin Abud	
1/9/2026	(Spain) Francisco Cabeza (Paraguay) Mariano Gonzalez San Martin	6–3 / 6–2	(Spain) Bentahor Espino (Spain) Iago Fuertes	
1/9/2026	(Argentina) Facundo Rodrigo Lopez (Argentina) Franco Dal Bianco	7–5 / 7–6	(Spain) Enrique Goenaga (Spain) Manuel Castaño	
1/9/2026	(Spain) Álvaro Melendez Amaya (Spain) Jose Luis González	4–6 / 6–2 / 7–6	(Argentina) Alex Chozas (Argentina) Juan De Pascual	
1/9/2026	(Spain) Andres Fernández Lancha (Italy) Denis Perino	3–6 / 7–5 / 7–6	(Spain) David Gala Sánchez (Italy) Enzo Jensen	
1/9/2026	(Spain) Asier Martinez Lopez (Spain) Javier Collantes	7–5 / 7–5	(Spain) Mario Del Castillo (Spain) Pincho Fernandez	
1/9/2026	(Spain) Jose Garcia Diestro (Spain) Marc Sintes	3–6 / 7–5 / 6–1	(Argentina) Leonel Aguirre (Spain) Pablo Garcia Rodrigo	
1/9/2026	(Italy) Alvaro Montiel Caruso (Spain) Gonzalo Rubio	6–4 / 3–6 / 6–2	(Spain) Daniel Santigosa (Argentina) Ramiro Jesus Valenzuela	
1/9/2026	(Italy) Aris Patiniotis (Spain) Diego Garcia Garcia	7–6 / 6–2	(Argentina) Ignacio Archieri (Spain) Pablo Sánchez Vicente	

=== Round of 32 ===
Men's

Date	Winners	Score	Opponent	Refs.
2/9/2026	(Argentina) Agustín Tapia (Spain) Arturo Coello	6–0 / 6–1	(Argentina) Federico Mourino (Spain) Marc Quilez	
2/9/2026	(Argentina) Juan Tello (Argentina) Maximiliano Arce	7–5 / 6–3	(Belgium) Clement Geens (France) Dylan Guichard	
2/9/2026	(Spain) Aléx Ruiz (Spain) Javier Garcia Mora	6–4 / 6–4	(Portugal) Miguel Deus (Portugal) Nuno Deus	
2/9/2026	(Spain) Coki Nieto (Spain) Miguel Yanguas	6–4 / 6–3	(Argentina) Ignacio Piotto (Argentina) Juan Ignacio Rubini	
2/9/2026	(Spain) Alonso Rodriguez Martinez (Italy) Flavio Abbate	2–6 / 7–6 / 7–6	(Spain) Francisco Guerrero (Spain) Javi Leal	
2/9/2026	(Spain) Jose Solano Marmolejo (Argentina) Ramiro Pereyra	3–6 / 6–3 / 6–4	(Spain) Aimar Goñi (Spain) Eduardo Alonso	
2/9/2026	(Argentina) Gonzalo Alfonso (Argentina) Valentino Libaak	6–3 / 7–6	(Spain) Javier Garrido (Brazil) Lucas Bergamini	
2/9/2026	(Spain) Juan Lebrón (Argentina) Leandro Augsburger	6–3 / 6–3	(Spain) Javier Martinez (Spain) Luis Hernandez Quesada	
2/9/2026	(Argentina) Franco Stupaczuk (Spain) Jon Sanz	6–4 / 6–3	(Spain) Francisco Cabeza (Paraguay) Mariano Gonzalez San Martin	
2/9/2026	(Spain) Alex Arroyo (Spain) Jose Jimenez Casas	7–5 / 6–3	(Argentina) Facundo Rodrigo Lopez (Argentina) Franco Dal Bianco	
2/9/2026	(United Arab Emirates) Inigo Jofre (Spain) Jairo Bautista	6–1 / 6–7 / 7–6	(Spain) Álvaro Melendez Amaya (Spain) Jose Luis González	
2/9/2026	(Brazil) Lucas Campagnolo (Spain) Momo González	6–4 / 6–3	(Spain) Andres Fernández Lancha (Italy) Denis Perino	
2/9/2026	(Argentina) Martin Di Nenno (Spain) Paquito Navarro	6–1 / 6–2	(Spain) Asier Martinez Lopez (Spain) Javier Collantes	
2/9/2026	(Spain) Javier Barahona (Argentina) Maximiliano Sánchez Blasco	7–6 / 7–6	(Spain) Jose Garcia Diestro (Spain) Marc Sintes	
2/9/2026	(Spain) Juanlu Esbri (Argentina) Sanyo Gutiérrez	6–3 / 3–6 / 6–3	(Italy) Alvaro Montiel Caruso (Spain) Gonzalo Rubio	
2/9/2026	(Spain) Alejandro Galán (Argentina) Federico Chingotto	6–2 / 6–4	(Italy) Aris Patiniotis (Spain) Diego Garcia Garcia	

Women's

Date	Winners	Score	Opponent	Refs.
2/9/2026	(Italy) Giulia Dal Pozzo (Spain) Nuria Rodriguez	6–2 / 6–1	(Argentina) Martina Fassio Goyeneche (Spain) Veronica Virseda	
2/9/2026	(Spain) Lorena Rufo (Spain) Victoria Iglesias	6–3 / 5–7 / 6–2	(Spain) Lucía Sainz (Spain) Sofia Saiz	
2/9/2026	(Spain) Alejandra Salazar (Argentina) Aranzazu Osoro	6–3 / 3–6 / 6–3	(Spain) Letizia Manquillo (Spain) Lucia Martinez Gomez	
1/9/2026	(Argentina) Claudia Jensen (Spain) Tamara Icardo	6–1 / 6–0	(Spain) Agueda Perez (Spain) Marta Caparros	
1/9/2026	(Spain) Maria Rodriguez Abajo (Spain) Noa Canovas	6–3 / 7–6	(Spain) Claudia Escacena (Spain) Noemi Aguilar	
2/9/2026	(Italy) Carolina Orsi (Spain) Patricia Llaguno	6–4 / 6–0	(Spain) Jimena Velasco (Spain) Raquel Eugenio Barrera	
2/9/2026	(Spain) Jessica Castelló (Spain) Marta Talavan	6–2 / 6–7 / 6–2	(Argentina) Julieta Bidahorria (Argentina) Virginia Riera	
1/9/2026	(Spain) Jana Montes (Spain) Marta Barrera	6–2 / 6–1	(Spain) Marta Arellano (Spain) Marina Lobo	
1/9/2026	(Spain) Alejandra Alonso (Spain) Marina Guinart	6–3 / 6–4	(Spain) Amanda Lopez Moral (Spain) Camila Fassio Goyeneche	
2/9/2026	(Spain) Marta Ortega (Portugal) Sofia Araújo	6–1 / 6–2	(Spain) Araceli Martinez (Spain) Laura Luján	
1/9/2026	(Spain) Beatriz Caldera (Spain) Carmen Goenaga	6–2 / 6–1	(Argentina) Daiara Valenzuela (France) Lea Godallier	
1/9/2026	(France) Alix Collombon (Russia) Ksenia Sharifova	6–3 / 6–0	(Spain) Barbara Las Heras (Spain) Carla Mesa	

=== Round of 16 ===
Men's

Date	Winners	Score	Opponent	Refs.
3/9/2026	(Argentina) Agustín Tapia (Spain) Arturo Coello	7–6 / 6–3	(Argentina) Juan Tello (Argentina) Maximiliano Arce	
3/9/2026	(Spain) Coki Nieto (Spain) Miguel Yanguas	6–2 / 6–1	(Spain) Aléx Ruiz (Spain) Javier Garcia Mora	
3/9/2026	(Spain) Alonso Rodriguez Martinez (Italy) Flavio Abbate	6–3 / 6–4	(Spain) Jose Solano Marmolejo (Argentina) Ramiro Pereyra	
3/9/2026	(Argentina) Gonzalo Alfonso (Argentina) Valentino Libaak	7–6 / 7–5	(Spain) Juan Lebrón (Argentina) Leandro Augsburger	
3/9/2026	(Spain) Alex Arroyo (Spain) Jose Jimenez Casas	7–6 / 6–4	(Argentina) Franco Stupaczuk (Spain) Jon Sanz	
3/9/2026	(United Arab Emirates) Inigo Jofre (Spain) Jairo Bautista	7–5 / 6–3	(Brazil) Lucas Campagnolo (Spain) Momo González	
3/9/2026	(Argentina) Martin Di Nenno (Spain) Paquito Navarro	6–4 / 6–2	(Spain) Javier Barahona (Argentina) Maximiliano Sánchez Blasco	
3/9/2026	(Spain) Alejandro Galán (Argentina) Federico Chingotto	6–4 / 6–0	(Spain) Juanlu Esbri (Argentina) Sanyo Gutiérrez	

Women's

Date	Winners	Score	Opponent	Refs.
3/9/2026	(Argentina) Delfina Brea (Spain) Gemma Triay	6–3 / 6–1	(Italy) Giulia Dal Pozzo (Spain) Nuria Rodriguez	
3/9/2026	(Spain) Alejandra Salazar (Argentina) Aranzazu Osoro	7–6 / 6–7 / 6–2	(Spain) Lorena Rufo (Spain) Victoria Iglesias	
3/9/2026	(Argentina) Claudia Jensen (Spain) Tamara Icardo	6–1 / 6–3	(Spain) Maria Rodriguez Abajo (Spain) Noa Canovas	
3/9/2026	(Spain) Andrea Ustero (Spain) Ariana Sánchez	6–0 / 6–7 / 6–2	(Italy) Carolina Orsi (Spain) Patricia Llaguno	
3/9/2026	(Spain) Claudia Fernández (Spain) Martina Calvo	6–4 / 6–4	(Spain) Jessica Castelló (Spain) Marta Talavan	
3/9/2026	(Spain) Alejandra Alonso (Spain) Marina Guinart	6–4 / 6–0	(Spain) Jana Montes (Spain) Marta Barrera	
3/9/2026	(Spain) Marta Ortega (Portugal) Sofia Araújo	6–3 / 3–6 / 6–4	(Spain) Beatriz Caldera (Spain) Carmen Goenaga	
3/9/2026	(Spain) Bea González (Spain) Paula Josemaría	6–2 / 6–1	(France) Alix Collombon (Russia) Ksenia Sharifova	

=== Quarter-Finals ===
Men's

Date	Winners	Score	Opponent	Refs.
4/9/2026	(Spain) Coki Nieto (Spain) Miguel Yanguas	7–5 / 7–6	(Argentina) Agustín Tapia (Spain) Arturo Coello	
4/9/2026	(Argentina) Gonzalo Alfonso (Argentina) Valentino Libaak	4–6 / 7–6 / 6–4	(Spain) Alonso Rodriguez Martinez (Italy) Flavio Abbate	
4/9/2026	(United Arab Emirates) Inigo Jofre (Spain) Jairo Bautista	6–2 / 6–7 / 6–3	(Spain) Alex Arroyo (Spain) Jose Jimenez Casas	
4/9/2026	(Spain) Alejandro Galán (Argentina) Federico Chingotto	4–6 / 6–3 / 7–6	(Argentina) Martin Di Nenno (Spain) Paquito Navarro	

Women's

Date	Winners	Score	Opponent	Refs.
4/9/2026	(Argentina) Delfina Brea (Spain) Gemma Triay	6–3 / 6–3	(Spain) Alejandra Salazar (Argentina) Aranzazu Osoro	
4/9/2026	(Spain) Andrea Ustero (Spain) Ariana Sánchez	6–7 / 6–1 / 6–3	(Argentina) Claudia Jensen (Spain) Tamara Icardo	
4/9/2026	(Spain) Claudia Fernández (Spain) Martina Calvo	7–6 / 6–2	(Spain) Alejandra Alonso (Spain) Marina Guinart	
4/9/2026	(Spain) Bea González (Spain) Paula Josemaría	6–0 / 6–2	(Spain) Marta Ortega (Portugal) Sofia Araújo	

=== Semi-Finals ===
Men's

Date	Winners	Score	Opponent	Refs.
5/9/2026	(Spain) Coki Nieto (Spain) Miguel Yanguas	6–4 / 7–6	(Argentina) Gonzalo Alfonso (Argentina) Valentino Libaak	
5/9/2026	(Spain) Alejandro Galán (Argentina) Federico Chingotto	6–3 / 6–4	(United Arab Emirates) Inigo Jofre (Spain) Jairo Bautista	

Women's

Date	Winners	Score	Opponent	Refs.
5/9/2026	(Argentina) Delfina Brea (Spain) Gemma Triay	6–2 / 6–4	(Spain) Andrea Ustero (Spain) Ariana Sánchez	
5/9/2026	(Spain) Bea González (Spain) Paula Josemaría	6–4 / 2–6 / 7–5	(Spain) Claudia Fernández (Spain) Martina Calvo	

=== Finals ===
Men's

Date	Winners	Score	Opponent	Refs.
6/9/2026	(Spain) Alejandro Galán (Argentina) Federico Chingotto	6–4 / 5–7 / 6–4	(Spain) Coki Nieto (Spain) Miguel Yanguas	

Women's

Date	Winners	Score	Opponent	Refs.
6/9/2026	(Argentina) Delfina Brea (Spain) Gemma Triay	6–7 / 6–3 / 6–3	(Spain) Bea González (Spain) Paula Josemaría	
