= 2026 Riyadh P1 =

Premier Padel tournament held in Riyadh

- Date: 7 – 14 February
- Edition: 3rd
- Category: P1
- Prize money: €479.068
- Location: Riyadh, Saudi Arabia
- Venue: Padel Rush Arena
- Court speed: Medium

Champions
- Men's doubles: (Argentina) Agustín Tapia (Spain) Arturo Coello
- Women's doubles: (Spain) Ariana Sánchez (Spain) Andrea Ustero

Chronology
Previous
Premier Padel Finals
(2025)
Next
Gijón P2

The 2026 Riyadh P1 (officially 2026 Premier Padel Riyadh Season P1) was the first tournament of the fifth season organized by Premier Padel, the premier padel circuit, promoted by the International Padel Federation, and with the financial backing of Nasser Al-Khelaïfi's Qatar Sports Investments.

In the women's category, the No. 1 and No. 3 seeded pairs in the FIP rankings kicked off the season first finals by facing each other. In the title match, Ariana Sánchez and Andrea Ustero defeated world number ones Delfina Brea and Gemma Triay, claiming their first title as a pair in their debut tournament together.

In the men's category, the two top-ranked pairs maintained the momentum from the previous season, facing each other for the first time in 2026; marking their seventh consecutive meeting across the current and previous season. In the title match, Agustín Tapia and Arturo Coello defeated Alejandro Galán and Federico Chingotto in straight sets, claiming their first title of the season.

== Relevant Data ==
=== New pairings debut ===
Several new pairings made their debut at the tournament. The first and most significant split involved the most successful duo in women's padel: Ariana Sánchez and Paula Josemaría. Similarly, the world's number 3 pair, Bea González and Claudia Fernández, also decided to part ways. Bea teamed up with Paula, while Ariana Sánchez chose Andrea Ustero as her new partner, and Claudia joined forces with Sofia Araújo.

Likewise, there were numerous changes in the men's category as well. In addition to Juan Lebrón and Leandro Augsburger launching a new project for 2026, Franco Stupaczuk announced that he and Mike Yanguas would play together again, forming a "2.0" version of their partnership. Meanwhile, Coki Nieto, Yanguas's former partner, teamed up with Jon Sanz.

=== Delfina and Gemma's losing streak in finals continues ===
With the loss to Ariana Sánchez and Andrea Ustero, the world's number one pair, have now suffered five defeats in as many finals, having lost in Kuwait, Dubai, Mexico, Barcelona, and now in Riyadh. Delfina and Gemma's last victory came at the Rotterdam P1, where they lifted the trophy on October 5th.

=== Tapia surpasses Galán as the active player with the most titles ===
With their victory in the final, Agustín Tapia and Arturo Coello improved their head-to-head record against Alejandro Galán and Federico Chingotto to 21 wins in 30 encounters. Furthermore, Tapia set a record by lifting the 54th trophy of his professional career, surpassing Galán (53) and establishing himself as the most successful active player. Considering only titles won on Premier Padel and World Padel Tour circuits, Tapia ranks fourth in the sport's history. Ahead of him are legends such as Fernando Belasteguín (162 titles), Juan Martín Díaz (116), and Pablo Lima (63).

Meanwhile, Arturo Coello reigns in Premier Padel with a total of 33 trophies, one more than Tapia, thanks to his victory alongside Bela at the 2022 Monterrey Major. At just 23 years old, Coello has already secured 47 career titles, placing him sixth on the all-time list, right behind his partner and Galán.

On the women's side, Ariana has opened up a narrow lead over Gemma in tournament wins, 54 to 52, and sits four titles behind Alejandra Salazar.

== Seeds ==
Male

Rnk.	Team	FIP Ranking Points
1	(Argentina) Agustín Tapia (Spain) Arturo Coello	39600
2	(Spain) Alejandro Galán (Argentina) Federico Chingotto	34640
3	(Argentina) Franco Stupaczuk (Spain) Mike Yanguas	14227
4	(Spain) Juan Lebrón (Argentina) Leandro Augsburguer	13000
5	(Spain) Francisco Guerrero (Spain) Paquito Navarro	10525
6	(Argentina) Martín Di Nenno (Spain) Momo González	9460
7	(Spain) Javi Leal (Spain) Jon Sanz	8790
8	(Brazil) Lucas Bergamini (Spain) Javi Garrido	7078
9	(Spain) Eduardo Alonso (Argentina) Juan Tello	6285
10	(Spain) Alejandro Arroyo (Argentina) Leonel Aguirre	5224
11	(Spain) Javier Barahona (Spain) Javier Garcia Mora	4975
12	(Argentina) Gonzalo Alfonso (Argentina) Sanyo Gutiérrez	4908
13	(Spain) Alejandro Ruiz (Spain) Juanlu Esbri	4862
14	(Spain) Jairo Bautista (Brazil) Lucas Campagnolo	4481
15	(Argentina) Alex Chozas (Argentina) Valentino Libaak	3699
16	(Spain) David Gala Sánchez (Spain) Pablo Garcia Rodrigo	3316

Female

Rnk.	Team	FIP Ranking Points
1	(Argentina) Delfina Brea (Spain) Gemma Triay	36120
2	(Spain) Bea González (Spain) Paula Josemaria	27760
3	(Spain) Ariana Sánchez (Spain) Andrea Ustero	21345
4	(Spain) Claudia Fernandéz (Portugal) Sofia Araújo	20070
5	(Argentina) Claudia Jensen (Spain) Tamara Icardo	11455
6	(Spain) Marta Ortega (Spain) Martina Calvo	11180
7	(Spain) Alejandra Alonso (Spain) Alejandra Salazar	10495
8	(Spain) Marina Guinart (Spain) Veronica Virseda	8225
9	(Spain) Beatriz Caldera (Spain) Carmen Goenaga	7430
10	(Argentina) Aranzazu Osoro (Spain) Victoria Iglesias	7060
11	(Spain) Lucia Sainz (Spain) Raquel Eugenio Barrera	5360
12	(Argentina) Martina Fassio Goyeneche (Spain) Patricia Llaguno	5335
13	(Spain) Jessica Castelló (Spain) Lorena Rufo	4670
14	(Spain) Jimena Velasco (Spain) Marta Barrera	4300
15	(Spain) Araceli Martinez (Italy) Carolina Orsi	3805
16	(Spain) Maria Rodriguez Abajo (Spain) Noa Canovas	3510

== Head-to-head record between teams ranked in the top 4 during the season ==
=== Man's ===
Record	Coello–Tapia	Galán–Chingotto	Stupaczuk–Yanguas	Augsburger–Lebrón
Coello–Tapia	—	1–0	—	1–0
Galán–Chingotto	0–1	—	—	—
Stupaczuk–Yanguas	—	—	—	—
Augsburger–Lebrón	0–1	—	—	—

=== Women's ===
Record	D. Brea–Triay	B. González–Paula	Ariana–Ustero	Araúijo–C. Fernandez
D. Brea–Triay	—	—	0–1	1–0
B. González–Paula	—	—	0–1	—
Ariana–Ustero	1–0	1–0	—	—
Araúijo–C. Fernandez	0–1	—	—	—

== Draws ==
=== Men's Bracket ===
Round of 32
1	(Spain) Coello / (Argentina) Tapia	3	6	6
LL	(France) B. Blanque / (France) D. Guichard	6	1	2
17	(Spain) J.J. Casas / (Argentina) M.S. Blasco	6	4
14	(Spain) J. Bautista / (Brazil) L. Campagnolo	7	6
9	(Spain) E. Alonso / (Argentina) J. Tello	6	7
18	(Spain) A.F. Lancha / (Spain) J.G. Diestro	3	6
Q	(Spain) I. Vilariño / (Spain) M. Del Castillo	2	6
6	(Argentina) Di Nenno / (Spain) Momo	6	7
7	(Spain) J. Leal / (Spain) J. Sanz	7	5	6
21	(United Arab Emirates) I. Jofre / (Spain) M. Castaño	5	7	7
Q	(Spain) J. Martinez / (Argentina) R. Valenzuela	6	6	6
12	(Argentina) G. Alfonso / (Argentina) Sanyo	3	7	3
15	(Argentina) A. Chozas / (Argentina) V. Libaak	6	6
Q	(Argentina) F. Lopez / (Paraguay) M. San Martin	4	4
Q	(Spain) Á. Amaya / (Spain) P. Amaya	1	2
4	(Spain) Lebrón / (Argentina) L. Augsburger
3	(Argentina) Stupaczuk / (Spain) Yanguas	7	6
20	(Spain) G. Collado / (Spain) P.H. Alvarez	6	3
32	(Spain) A. Goñi / (Spain) E. Goenaga	4	4
13	(Spain) A. Ruiz / (Spain) J. Esbri	6	6
16	(Spain) D.G. Sánchez / (Spain) P.G. Rodrigo	4	4
26	(Italy) D. Perino / (Argentina) I. Piotto	6	6
29	(Italy) E. Jensen / (Spain) L.H. Quesada	4	6	1
5	(Spain) F. Guerrero / (Spain) Paquito	6	3	6
8	(Spain) J. Garrido / (Brazil) L. Bergamini	2	6	6
Q	(Argentina) A. Gutiérrez / (Spain) S. Oria	6	3	1
25	(Argentina) L. Capra / (Spain) V. Ruiz	2	4
10	(Spain) A. Arroyo / (Argentina) L. Aguirre	6	6
11	(Spain) J. Barahona / (Spain) J.G. Mora	6	6
Q	(Chile) J. Valdes / (Argentina) R. Nuñez	2	2
19	(Spain) G. Rubio / (Spain) J. Ruiz	2	2
2	(Argentina) Chingotto / (Spain) Galán	6	6

Round of 16
1	(Spain) Coello / (Argentina) Tapia	7	7
14	(Spain) J. Bautista / (Brazil) L. Campagnolo	6	6
9	(Spain) E. Alonso / (Argentina) J. Tello	6	4	7
6	(Argentina) Di Nenno / (Spain) Momo	2	6	5
21	(United Arab Emirates) I. Jofre / (Spain) M. Castaño	4	3
Q	(Spain) J. Martinez / (Argentina) R. Valenzuela	6	6
15	(Argentina) A. Chozas / (Argentina) V. Libaak	1	6
4	(Spain) Lebrón / (Argentina) L. Augsburger	6	7
3	(Argentina) Stupaczuk / (Spain) Yanguas	7	6
13	(Spain) A. Ruiz / (Spain) J. Esbri	5	2
26	(Italy) D. Perino / (Argentina) I. Piotto	4	6
5	(Spain) F. Guerrero / (Spain) Paquito	6	7
8	(Spain) J. Garrido / (Brazil) L. Bergamini	6	6
10	(Spain) A. Arroyo / (Argentina) L. Aguirre	3	2
11	(Spain) J. Barahona / (Spain) J.G. Mora	3	2
2	(Argentina) Chingotto / (Spain) Galán	6	6

Quarter-Final
1	(Spain) Coello / (Argentina) Tapia	6	2	*
9	(Spain) E. Alonso / (Argentina) J. Tello	2	1
Q	(Spain) J. Martinez / (Argentina) R. Valenzuela	2	5
4	(Spain) Lebrón / (Argentina) L. Augsburger	6	7
3	(Argentina) Stupaczuk / (Spain) Yanguas	6	3	2
5	(Spain) F. Guerrero / (Spain) Paquito	3	6	6
8	(Spain) J. Garrido / (Brazil) L. Bergamini	1	3
2	(Argentina) Chingotto / (Spain) Galán	6	6

Semi-Finals
1	(Spain) Coello / (Argentina) Tapia	7	6	6
4	(Spain) Lebrón / (Argentina) L. Augsburger	6	7	4
5	(Spain) F. Guerrero / (Spain) Paquito	1	2
2	(Argentina) Chingotto / (Spain) Galán	6	6

Finals
1	(Spain) Coello / (Argentina) Tapia	6	6
2	(Argentina) Chingotto / (Spain) Galán	4	2

=== Women's Bracket ===
Round of 32
1	(Argentina) D. Brea / (Spain) G. Triay
Bye
12	(Argentina) M. Goyeneche / (Spain) P. Llaguno	6	6
23	(Spain) T. Navarro / (Argentina) V. Riera	1	2
9	(Spain) B. Caldera / (Spain) C. Goenaga	7	4	6
14	(Spain) M. Barrera / (Spain) J. Velasco	6	6	2
13	(Spain) J. Castelló / (Spain) L. Rufo	3	1
6	(Spain) M. Ortega / (Spain) M. Calvo	6	6
8	(Spain) M. Guinart / (Spain) V. Virseda	6	6
19	(Spain) A. Perez / (Spain) L. Martinez	4	4
10	(Argentina) A. Osoro / (Spain) V. Iglesias	6	7
Q	(Italy) G. Dal Pozzo / (Spain) N. Rodriguez	3	6
15	(Spain) A. Martinez / (Italy) C. Orsi	6	7
Q	(Spain) B. Las Heras / (Spain) J. Bautista	3	6
Bye
4	(Spain) C. Fernández / (Portugal) S. Araújo
3	(Spain) A. Ustero / (Spain) A. Sánchez
Bye
18	(Russia) K. Sharifova / (Spain) M. Borrero	5	7	3
Q	(Spain) M. Talavan / (Spain) S. Saiz	7	6	6
22	(Portugal) A. Nogueira / (Spain) L. Luján	3	2
21	(Spain) L. Arruabarrena / (Spain) M. Lobo	6	6
17	(Argentina) J. Bidahorria / (Spain) M. Caparros	3	1
7	(Spain) A. Salazar / (Spain) A. Alonso	6	6
5	(Argentina) C. Jensen / (Spain) T. Icardo	6	6
11	(Spain) L. Sainz / (Spain) R. Barrera	4	3
WC	(Saudi Arabia) A. Yamani / (Saudi Arabia) A. Khalil	0	0
Q	(Italy) G. Marchetti / (France) L. Godallier	6	6
16	(Spain) M.R. Abajo / (Spain) N. Canovas	6	3	6
20	(France) A. Collombon / (Spain) J. Montes	0	6	0
Bye
2	(Spain) Bea González / (Spain) P. Josemaria

Round of 16
1	(Argentina) D. Brea / (Spain) G. Triay	6	6
12	(Argentina) M. Goyeneche / (Spain) P. Llaguno	3	3
9	(Spain) B. Caldera / (Spain) C. Goenaga	0	4
6	(Spain) M. Ortega / (Spain) M. Calvo	6	6
8	(Spain) M. Guinart / (Spain) V. Virseda	6	6	3
10	(Argentina) A. Osoro / (Spain) V. Iglesias	7	1	6
15	(Spain) A. Martinez / (Italy) C. Orsi	5	3
4	(Spain) C. Fernández / (Portugal) S. Araújo	7	6
3	(Spain) A. Ustero / (Spain) A. Sánchez	6	7
Q	(Spain) M. Talavan / (Spain) S. Saiz	0	6
21	(Spain) L. Arruabarrena / (Spain) M. Lobo	2	1
7	(Spain) A. Salazar / (Spain) A. Alonso	6	6
5	(Argentina) C. Jensen / (Spain) T. Icardo	6	6
Q	(Italy) G. Marchetti / (France) L. Godallier	2	2
16	(Spain) M.R. Abajo / (Spain) N. Canovas	3	2
2	(Spain) Bea González / (Spain) P. Josemaria	6	6

Quarter-Final
1	(Argentina) D. Brea / (Spain) G. Triay	6	6
6	(Spain) M. Ortega / (Spain) M. Calvo	2	4
10	(Argentina) A. Osoro / (Spain) V. Iglesias	4	4
4	(Spain) C. Fernández / (Portugal) S. Araújo	6	6
3	(Spain) A. Ustero / (Spain) A. Sánchez	6	6
7	(Spain) A. Salazar / (Spain) A. Alonso	2	1
5	(Argentina) C. Jensen / (Spain) T. Icardo	6	6	6
2	(Spain) Bea González / (Spain) P. Josemaria	7	4	2

Semi-Finals
1	(Argentina) D. Brea / (Spain) G. Triay	7	5	6
4	(Spain) C. Fernández / (Portugal) S. Araújo	5	7	3
3	(Spain) A. Ustero / (Spain) A. Sánchez	6	6
2	(Spain) Bea González / (Spain) P. Josemaria	4	3

Finals
1	(Argentina) D. Brea / (Spain) G. Triay	6	1	4
3	(Spain) A. Ustero / (Spain) A. Sánchez	3	6	6

== Results ==
=== First Round ===
Men's

Date	Winners	Score	Opponent	Refs.
9/2/2026	(France) Bastien Blanque (France) Dylan Guichard	7–5 / 6–1	(Italy) Facundo Dominguez (Argentina) Juan Cruz Belluati	
9/2/2026	(Spain) Jose Jimenez Casas (Argentina) Maxi Sanchez Blasco	6–0 / 6–1	(Saudi Arabia) Omar Althagib (Saudi Arabia) Sattam Alshahrani	
9/2/2026	(Spain) Andres Fernandez Lancha (Spain) Jose García Diestro	6–2 / 6–3	(Italy) Aris Patiniotis (Argentina) Eduardo Agustin Torre	
9/2/2026	(Spain) Ignacio Vilariño (Spain) Mario Del Castillo	6–3 / 7–6	(Spain) Alvaro Cepero (United Arab Emirates) Arnau Ayats	
9/2/2026	(United Arab Emirates) Iñigo Jofre (Spain) Manuel Castaño	6–2 / 6–4	(Spain) Francisco Cabeza (Spain) Teodoro Zapata	
9/2/2026	(Spain) Javier Martinez Vazquez (Argentina) Ramiro Valenzuela	2–6 / 6–3 / 6–2	(Spain) Jose Luis Gonzalez (Spain) Pincho Fernandez	
9/2/2026	(Argentina) Facundo Lopez (Paraguay) Mariano Gonzalez	7–6 / 6–3	(Italy) Marco Cassetta (Spain) Mario Huete Hernandez	
9/2/2026	(Spain) Álvaro Melendez Amaya (Spain) Pedro Melendez Amaya	6–3 / 5–7 / 7–6	(Argentina) Federico Mouriño (Spain) Marc Quilez	
9/2/2026	(Spain) Guillermo Collado (Spain) Pol Hernandez	7–5 / 6–4	(Spain) Daniel Santigosa (Spain) Marc Sintes	
9/2/2026	(Spain) Aimar Goñi (Spain) Enrique Goenaga	6–2 / 4–6 / 6–4	(Portugal) Nuno Deus (France) Thomas Leygue	
9/2/2026	(Italy) Denis Perino (Argentina) Ignacio Piotto	6–0 / 6–2	(Saudi Arabia) Abudlrahman Alazzan (Saudi Arabia) Ali Alburayh	
9/2/2026	(Italy) Enzo Jensen (Spain) Luis Hernandez Quesada	6–3 / 6–2	(Spain) Francisco Gil Morales (Argentina) Maxi Sánchez	
9/2/2026	(Argentina) Agustín Gutiérrez (Spain) Salvador Oria	6–3 / 4–6 / 7–6	(Spain) Ignacio Sager (Argentina) Juan Rubini	
9/2/2026	(Argentina) Lucho Capra (Spain) Victor Ruiz	6–1 / 6–7 / 6–2	(Argentina) Federico Chiostri (Spain) Rafael Mendéz	
9/2/2026	(Chile) Javier Valdes (Argentina) Renzo Nuñez	6–0 / 6–0	(Saudi Arabia) Faisal Alrebdi (Saudi Arabia) Nawaf Alkadi	
9/2/2026	(Spain) Gonzalo Rubio (Spain) Javi Ruiz	4–6 / 7–6 / 7–6	(Argentina) Maximiliano Arce (Spain) Pablo Lijó	

=== Round of 32 ===
Men's

Date	Winners	Score	Opponent	Refs.
10/2/2026	(Argentina) Agustín Tapia (Spain) Arturo Coello	3–6 / 6–1 / 6–2	(France) Bastien Blanque (France) Dylan Guichard	
10/2/2026	(Spain) Jairo Bautista (Brazil) Lucas Campagnolo	7–6 / 6–4	(Spain) Jose Jimenez Casas (Argentina) Maxi Sanchez Blasco	
10/2/2026	(Spain) Eduardo Alonso (Argentina) Juan Tello	6–3 / 7–6	(Spain) Andres Fernandez Lancha (Spain) Jose García Diestro	
10/2/2026	(Argentina) Martin Di Nenno (Spain) Momo González	6–2 / 7–6	(Spain) Ignacio Vilariño (Spain) Mario Del Castillo	
10/2/2026	(United Arab Emirates) Iñigo Jofre (Spain) Manuel Castaño	5–7 / 7–5 / 7–6	(Spain) Javier Leal (Spain) Jon Sanz	
10/2/2026	(Spain) Javier Martinez Vazquez (Argentina) Ramiro Valenzuela	6–3 / 6–7 / 6–3	(Argentina) Gonzalo Alfonso (Argentina) Sanyo Gutiérrez	
10/2/2026	(Argentina) Alex Chozas (Argentina) Valentino Libaak	6–4 / 6–4	(Argentina) Facundo Lopez (Paraguay) Mariano Gonzalez	
10/2/2026	(Spain) Juan Lebrón (Argentina) Leandro Augsburger	6–1 / 6–2	(Spain) Álvaro Melendez Amaya (Spain) Pedro Melendez Amaya	
10/2/2026	(Argentina) Franco Stupaczuk (Spain) Miguel Yanguas	7–6 / 6–3	(Spain) Guillermo Collado (Spain) Pol Hernandez	
10/2/2026	(Spain) Aléx Ruiz (Spain) Juanlu Esbri	6–4 / 6–4	(Spain) Aimar Goñi (Spain) Enrique Goenaga	
10/2/2026	(Italy) Denis Perino (Argentina) Ignacio Piotto	6–4 / 6–4	(Spain) David Gala Sánchez (Spain) Pablo García Rodrigo	
10/2/2026	(Spain) Francisco Guerrero (Spain) Paquito Navarro	6–4 / 3–6 / 6–1	(Italy) Enzo Jensen (Spain) Luis Hernandez Quesada	
10/2/2026	(Spain) Javier Garrido (Brazil) Lucas Bergamini	2–6 / 6–3 / 6–1	(Argentina) Agustín Gutiérrez (Spain) Salvador Oria	
10/2/2026	(Spain) Alex Arroyo (Argentina) Leonel Aguirre	6–2 / 6–4	(Argentina) Lucho Capra (Spain) Victor Ruiz	
10/2/2026	(Spain) Javier Barahona (Spain) Javier García Mora	6–2 / 6–2	(Chile) Javier Valdes (Argentina) Renzo Nuñez	
10/2/2026	(Spain) Alejandro Galán (Argentina) Federico Chingotto	6–2 / 6–2	(Spain) Gonzalo Rubio (Spain) Javi Ruiz	

Women's

Date	Winners	Score	Opponent	Refs.
10/2/2026	(Argentina) Martina Fassio Goyeneche (Spain) Patricia Llaguno	6–1 / 6–2	(Spain) Teresa Navarro (Argentina) Virginia Riera	
10/2/2026	(Spain) Beatriz Caldera (Spain) Carmen Goenaga	7–6 / 4–6 / 6–2	(Spain) Jimena Velasco (Spain) Marta Barrera	
9/2/2026	(Spain) Marta Ortega (Spain) Martina Calvo	6–3 / 6–1	(Spain) Jessica Castelló (Spain) Lorena Rufo	
9/2/2026	(Spain) Marina Guinart (Spain) Verónica Virseda	6–4 / 6–4	(Spain) Águeda Perez (Spain) Lucia Martinez Gomez	
10/2/2026	(Argentina) Aranzazu Osoro (Spain) Victoria Iglesias	6–3 / 7–6	(Italy) Giulia Dal Pozzo (Spain) Nuria Rodriguez	
9/2/2026	(Spain) Araceli Martinez (Italy) Carolina Orsi	6–3 / 7–6	(Spain) Barbara Las Heras (Spain) Julia Polo Bautista	
9/2/2026	(Spain) Marta Talavan (Spain) Sofía Saiz Vallejo	7–5 / 6–7 / 6–3	(Russia) Ksenia Sharifova (Spain) Marta Borrero	
10/2/2026	(Spain) Lara Arruabarrena (Spain) Marina Martinez Lobo	6–3 / 6–2	(Portugal) Ana Catarina Nogueira (Spain) Laura Lujan Rodriguez	
10/2/2026	(Spain) Alejandra Alonso (Spain) Alejandra Salazar	6–3 / 6–1	(Argentina) Julieta Bidahorria (Spain) Marta Caparros	
10/2/2026	(Argentina) Claudia Jensen (Spain) Tamara Icardo	6–4 / 6–3	(Spain) Lucia Sainz (Spain) Raquel Eugenio Barrera	
9/2/2026	(Italy) Giorgia Marchetti (France) Lea Godallier	6–0 / 6–0	(Saudi Arabia) Alanoud Yamani (Saudi Arabia) Areej Khalil Fareh	
9/2/2026	(Spain) Laia Rodriguez Abajo (Spain) Noa Canovas	6–0 / 3–6 / 6–0	(France) Alix Collombon (Spain) Jana Montes	

=== Round of 16 ===
Men's

Date	Winners	Score	Opponent	Refs.
11/2/2026	(Argentina) Agustín Tapia (Spain) Arturo Coello	7–6 / 7–6	(Spain) Jairo Bautista (Brazil) Lucas Campagnolo	
11/2/2026	(Spain) Eduardo Alonso (Argentina) Juan Tello	6–2 / 4–6 / 7–5	(Argentina) Martin Di Nenno (Spain) Momo González	
11/2/2026	(Spain) Javier Martinez Vazquez (Argentina) Ramiro Valenzuela	6–4 / 6–2	(United Arab Emirates) Iñigo Jofre (Spain) Manuel Castaño	
11/2/2026	(Spain) Juan Lebrón (Argentina) Leandro Augsburger	6–1 / 7–6	(Argentina) Alex Chozas (Argentina) Valentino Libaak	
11/2/2026	(Argentina) Franco Stupaczuk (Spain) Miguel Yanguas	7–5 / 6–2	(Spain) Aléx Ruiz (Spain) Juanlu Esbri	
11/2/2026	(Spain) Francisco Guerrero (Spain) Paquito Navarro	6–4 / 7–6	(Italy) Denis Perino (Argentina) Ignacio Piotto	
11/2/2026	(Spain) Javier Garrido (Brazil) Lucas Bergamini	6–3 / 6–2	(Spain) Alex Arroyo (Argentina) Leonel Aguirre	
11/2/2026	(Spain) Alejandro Galán (Argentina) Federico Chingotto	6–3 / 6–2	(Spain) Javier Barahona (Spain) Javier García Mora	

Women's

Date	Winners	Score	Opponent	Refs.
11/2/2026	(Argentina) Delfina Brea (Spain) Gemma Triay	6–3 / 6–3	(Argentina) Martina Fassio Goyeneche (Spain) Patricia Llaguno	
11/2/2026	(Spain) Marta Ortega (Spain) Martina Calvo	6–0 / 6–4	(Spain) Beatriz Caldera (Spain) Carmen Goenaga	
11/2/2026	(Argentina) Aranzazu Osoro (Spain) Victoria Iglesias	7–6 / 1–6 / 6–3	(Spain) Marina Guinart (Spain) Verónica Virseda	
11/2/2026	(Spain) Claudia Fernández (Portugal) Sofia Araújo	7–5 / 6–3	(Spain) Araceli Martinez (Italy) Carolina Orsi	
11/2/2026	(Spain) Andrea Ustero (Spain) Ariana Sánchez	6–0 / 7–5	(Spain) Marta Talavan (Spain) Sofía Saiz Vallejo	
11/2/2026	(Spain) Alejandra Alonso (Spain) Alejandra Salazar	6–2 / 6–1	(Spain) Lara Arruabarrena (Spain) Marina Martinez Lobo	
11/2/2026	(Argentina) Claudia Jensen (Spain) Tamara Icardo	6–2 / 6–2	(Italy) Giorgia Marchetti (France) Lea Godallier	
11/2/2026	(Spain) Bea González (Spain) Paula Josemaría	6–3 / 6–2	(Spain) Laia Rodriguez Abajo (Spain) Noa Canovas	

=== Quarter-Finals ===
Men's

Date	Winners	Score	Opponent	Refs.
12/2/2026	(Argentina) Agustín Tapia (Spain) Arturo Coello	6–2 / 2–1 / W.O.	(Spain) Eduardo Alonso (Argentina) Juan Tello	
12/2/2026	(Spain) Juan Lebrón (Argentina) Leandro Augsburger	6–2 / 7–5	(Spain) Javier Martinez Vazquez (Argentina) Ramiro Valenzuela	
12/2/2026	(Spain) Francisco Guerrero (Spain) Paquito Navarro	3–6 / 6–3 / 6–2	(Argentina) Franco Stupaczuk (Spain) Miguel Yanguas	
12/2/2026	(Spain) Alejandro Galán (Argentina) Federico Chingotto	6–1 / 6–3	(Spain) Javier Garrido (Brazil) Lucas Bergamini	

Women's

Date	Winners	Score	Opponent	Refs.
12/2/2026	(Argentina) Delfina Brea (Spain) Gemma Triay	6–2 / 6–4	(Spain) Marta Ortega (Spain) Martina Calvo	
12/2/2026	(Spain) Claudia Fernández (Portugal) Sofia Araújo	6–4 / 6–4	(Argentina) Aranzazu Osoro (Spain) Victoria Iglesias	
12/2/2026	(Spain) Andrea Ustero (Spain) Ariana Sánchez	6–2 / 6–1	(Spain) Alejandra Alonso (Spain) Alejandra Salazar	
12/2/2026	(Argentina) Claudia Jensen (Spain) Tamara Icardo	6–7 / 6–4 / 6–2	(Spain) Bea González (Spain) Paula Josemaría	

=== Semi-Finals ===
Men's

Date	Winners	Score	Opponent	Refs.
13/2/2026	(Argentina) Agustín Tapia (Spain) Arturo Coello	7–6 / 6–7 / 6–4	(Spain) Juan Lebrón (Argentina) Leandro Augsburger	
13/2/2026	(Spain) Alejandro Galán (Argentina) Federico Chingotto	6–1 / 6–2	(Spain) Francisco Guerrero (Spain) Paquito Navarro	

Women's

Date	Winners	Score	Opponent	Refs.
13/2/2026	(Argentina) Delfina Brea (Spain) Gemma Triay	7–5 / 5–7 / 6–3	(Spain) Claudia Fernández (Portugal) Sofia Araújo	
13/2/2026	(Spain) Andrea Ustero (Spain) Ariana Sánchez	6–4 / 6–3	(Argentina) Claudia Jensen (Spain) Tamara Icardo	

=== Finals ===
Men's

Date	Winners	Score	Opponent	Refs.
14/2/2026	(Argentina) Agustín Tapia (Spain) Arturo Coello	6–4 / 6–2	(Spain) Alejandro Galán (Argentina) Federico Chingotto	

Women's

Date	Winners	Score	Opponent	Refs.
14/2/2026	(Spain) Andrea Ustero (Spain) Ariana Sánchez	3–6 / 6–1 / 6–4	(Argentina) Delfina Brea (Spain) Gemma Triay	
