= 2024 Mexico Major =

Padel championships

- Date: 23 November – 1 December
- Edition: 2nd
- Category: Major
- Prize money: €800.000
- Location: Acapulco, Mexico
- Venue: Arena GNP Seguros

Champions
- Men's doubles: (Argentina) Agustín Tapia (Spain) Arturo Coello
- Women's doubles: (Spain) Claudia Fernández (Spain) Gemma Triay

Chronology

The 2024 Mexico Major (officially 2024 GNP Mexico Major Premier Padel) was the twenty-second tournament of the third season organized by Premier Padel, promoted by the International Padel Federation, and with the financial backing of Nasser Al-Khelaïfi's Qatar Sports Investments, now serving as the premier padel circuit.

In the women's category, Marta Ortega and Sofia Araujo reached their fourth final after defeating world number ones Ariana Sánchez and Paula Josemaría in the semifinals. In the finals they faced the number 2 seeds,Claudia Fernández and Gemma Triay, who were playing their tenth final of the season, and after three hard-fought sets Claudia and Gemma claimed their fifth title of 2024.

In the men's category, Franco Stupaczuk and Mike Yanguas repeated their performance from the previous tournament by defeating Alejandro Galán and Federico Chingotto in the semifinals, preventing the number 1 and 2 seeds from facing each other in the final for the second consecutive time. In the finals, the number 1 seeds Agustín Tapia and Arturo Coello, faced and defeated the number 4 seeds, Franco Stupaczuk and Mike Yanguas, claiming their 12th title of 2024.

== Relevant Data ==
=== Belasteguín out of Premier Padel Fianls ===
With the elimination of Fernando Belasteguín and Valentino Libaak in the first round, Belasteguín was mathematically ruled out of contention for the Premier Padel Finals in Barcelona, meaning the Milan P1 would be the final tournament of his career.

=== Back-to-back tournaments without the top two pairs ===
With the defeat of Alejandro Galán and Federico Chingotto by Franco Stupaczuk and Mike Yanguas in the semifinals, for the first time this season, two consecutive tournaments finals did not feature one of the two top-ranked pairs.

=== End of the race for men's number one ===
With their quarterfinal victory, Arturo Coello and Agustín Tapia mathematically secured the year-end world number one ranking for the second consecutive season. In 2024, they reached every final of tournaments they competed except one, in the Seville P2, and currently have a 40-match winning streak, having won eight consecutive tournaments, including this one.

== Seeds ==
Male

Rnk.	Team	FIP Ranking Points
1	(Argentina) Agustín Tapia (Spain) Arturo Coello	33583
2	(Spain) Alejandro Galán (Argentina) Federico Chingotto	24409
3	(Spain) Juan Lebrón (Argentina) Martin Di Nenno	15061
4	(Argentina) Franco Stupaczuk (Spain) Miguel Yanguas	14196
5	(Spain) Pablo Cardona (Spain) Paquito Navarro	8391
6	(Spain) Coki Nieto (Spain) Jon Sanz	8167
7	(Spain) Eduardo Alonso (Spain) Momo Gonzalez	7567
8	(Spain) Javi Garrido (Brazil) Lucas Bergamini	7455
9	(Spain) Alejandro Arroyo (Spain) Alejandro Ruiz	5456
10	(Spain) Jose Garcia Diestro (Argentina) Sanyo Gutiérrez	4269
11	(Argentina) Fernando Belasteguín (Argentina) Valentino Libaak	4106
12	(Argentina) Lucho Capra (Argentina) Maxi Sanchéz	4046
13	(Spain) Francisco Guerrero (Spain) Jairo Bautista	3995
14	(United Arab Emirates) Inigo Jofre (Argentina) Juan Tello	3767
15	(Spain) Javier Leal (Brazil) Lucas Campagnolo	3602
16	(Argentina) Alex Chozas (Argentina) Leandro Augsburguer	3464

Female

Rnk.	Team	FIP Ranking Points
1	(Spain) Ariana Sánchez (Spain) Paula Josemaria	30512
2	(Spain) Claudia Fernandez (Spain) Gemma Triay	20047
3	(Spain) Beatriz Gonzalez (Argentina) Delfina Brea	16454
4	(Spain) Marta Ortega (Portugal) Sofia Araújo	12168
5	(Spain) Alejandra Salazar (Spain) Jessica Castello	10561
6	(Spain) Lucia Sainz (Spain) Patricia Llaguno	10258
7	(Argentina) Claudia Jensen (Spain) Tamara Icardo	8609
8	(Argentina) Aranzazu Osoro (Spain) Veronica Virseda	8199
9	(Spain) Alejandra Alonso (Spain) Andrea Ustero	7766
10	(Spain) Carmen Goenaga (Argentina) Virginia Riera	5424
11	(Spain) Beatriz Caldera (Spain) Lorena Rufo	4219
12	(Spain) Marina Guinart (Spain) Victoria Iglesias	3476
13	(Italy) Carolina Orsi (Spain) Nuria Rodriguez	3422
14	(Spain) Carla Mesa (Spain) Lucia Martinez Gomez	3242
15	(Russia) Ksenia Sharifova (Spain) Marta Marrero	2921
16	(France) Alix Collombon (Spain) Araceli Martinez	2835

== Head-to-head record between teams ranked in the top 4 during the season ==
=== Man's ===
Record	Coello–Tapia	Galán–Chingotto	Lebrón–Di Nenno	Stupaczuk–Yanguas	Former Pairs	Galán–Lebrón	Paquito–Sanyo	Lebrón–Paquito	Di Nenno–Stupaczuk
Coello–Tapia	—	9–5	4–0	3–0		1–1	2–0	4–0	1–0
Galán–Chingotto	5–9	—	1–0	2–2		—	—	1–0	7–0
Lebrón–Di Nenno	0–4	0–1	—	—		—	—	—	—
Stupaczuk–Yanguas	0–3	2–2	—	—		—	—	—	—
Former Pairs									
Galán–Lebrón	1–1	—	—	—		—	—	—	2–0
Paquito–Sanyo	0–2	—	—	—		—	—	—	—
Lebrón–Paquito	0–4	0–1	—	—		—	—	—	0–1
Di Nenno–Stupaczuk	0–1	0–7	—	—		0–2	—	1–0	—

=== Women's ===
Record	Ariana–Paula	Fernandez–Triay	Gonzalez–D. Brea	Araújo–Ortega	Former Pairs	Icardo–Salazar	Ortega–Triay	Ortega–Virseda
Ariana–Paula	—	6–5	3–1	3–2		1–0	—	1–0
Fernandez–Triay	5–6	—	4–3	1–0		0–1	—	1–0
B. Gonzalez–D. Brea	1–3	3–4	—	2–0		3–0	—	—
Araújo–Ortega	2–3	0–1	0–2	—		—	—	—
Former Pairs								
Icardo–Salazar	0–1	1–0	0–3	—		—	—	—
Ortega–Triay	—	—	—	—		—	—	—
Ortega–Virseda	0–1	0–1	—	—		—	—	—

Matchups involving Andrea Ustero and Delfina Brea, and subsequently Delfina Brea and Lucia Sainz, are not included, as these were merely temporary pairings that lasted for a total of three tournaments while Bea González was recovering from an injury.

== Draws ==
=== Men's Bracket ===
Round of 32
1	(Spain) Coello / (Argentina) Tapia	6	6
44	(Spain) P.H. Alvarez / (Argentina) R. Valenzuela	1	2
20	(Spain) I. Sager / (Spain) S. Oria	4	2
9	(Spain) A. Arroyo / (Spain) A. Ruiz	6	6
LL	(Spain) J. Sanchez / (Portugal) P. Araujo	4	4
22	(Spain) J. Barahona / (Spain) T. Zapata	6	6
18	(Spain) F. Gil / (Spain) J. Esbri	4	3
6	(Spain) Coki / (Spain) J. Sanz	6	6
7	(Spain) E. Alonso / (Spain) Momo	6	6
37	(Spain) D.G. Sanchez / (Spain) J. Munoz	3	2
25	(Spain) A. Cepero / (Spain) M. Benitez	3	6	7
32	(Spain) J. Marmolejo / (Spain) V. Mena	6	3	6
12	(Argentina) L. Capra / (Argentina) Maxi	6	6
Q	(Spain) M. Salguero / (Italy) N. Suescun	4	2
29	(Italy) F. Dominguez / (Spain) E. Chamero	1	0
3	(Argentina) Di Nenno / (Spain) Lebrón	6	6
4	(Argentina) Stupaczuk / (Spain) Yanguas	6	6
Q	(Portugal) M. Deus / (Portugal) N. Deus	4	3
40	(Spain) A. Sans / (Spain) I. Ramirez	3	6	5
Q	(Argentina) E. Torre / (Spain) G. Serrano	6	2	7
15	(Spain) J. Leal / (Brazil) L. Campagnolo	4	4
21	(Spain) J. Barahona / (Spain) T. Zapata	6	6
30	(United Arab Emirates) A. Ayats / (Spain) P.G. Rodrigo	6	2	6
8	(Spain) J. Garrido / (Brazil) L. Bergamini	4	6	7
5	(Spain) Paquito / (Spain) P. Cardona	7	6	6
Q	(Sweden) A. Axelsson / (Sweden) S. Vasquez	6	7	3
26	(Spain) J.J. Casas / (Spain) P. Fernandez	6	7
14	(United Arab Emirates) I. Jofre / (Argentina) J. Tello	4	6
10	(Spain) J.G. Diestro / (Argentina) Sanyo	4	1
28	(Italy) A. Patiniotis / (Spain) J. Moya	6	6
34	(Spain) D. Sastre / (Argentina) Lamperti	2	2
2	(Spain) Galán / (Argentina) Chingotto	6	6

Round of 16
1	(Spain) Coello / (Argentina) Tapia	6	6
9	(Spain) A. Arroyo / (Spain) A. Ruiz	3	4
22	(Spain) J. Barahona / (Spain) T. Zapata	2	3
6	(Spain) Coki / (Spain) J. Sanz	6	6
7	(Spain) E. Alonso / (Spain) Momo	6	6
25	(Spain) A. Cepero / (Spain) M. Benitez	4	1
12	(Argentina) L. Capra / (Argentina) Maxi	3	3
3	(Argentina) Di Nenno / (Spain) Lebrón	6	6
4	(Argentina) Stupaczuk / (Spain) Yanguas	6	6
Q	(Argentina) E. Torre / (Spain) G. Serrano	3	2
21	(Spain) J. Barahona / (Spain) T. Zapata	6	1	7
8	(Spain) J. Garrido / (Brazil) L. Bergamini	2	6	6
5	(Spain) Paquito / (Spain) P. Cardona
26	(Spain) J.J. Casas / (Spain) P. Fernandez	*
28	(Italy) A. Patiniotis / (Spain) J. Moya	4	3
2	(Spain) Galán / (Argentina) Chingotto	6	6

Quarter-Final
1	(Spain) Coello / (Argentina) Tapia	6	6
6	(Spain) Coki / (Spain) J. Sanz	4	3
7	(Spain) E. Alonso / (Spain) Momo	3	3
3	(Argentina) Di Nenno / (Spain) Lebrón	6	6
4	(Argentina) Stupaczuk / (Spain) Yanguas	7	6
21	(Spain) J. Barahona / (Spain) T. Zapata	5	4
26	(Spain) J.J. Casas / (Spain) P. Fernandez	2	1
2	(Spain) Galán / (Argentina) Chingotto	6	6

Semi-Finals
1	(Spain) Coello / (Argentina) Tapia	6	3	7
3	(Argentina) Di Nenno / (Spain) Lebrón	3	6	6
4	(Argentina) Stupaczuk / (Spain) Yanguas	7	7
2	(Spain) Galán / (Argentina) Chingotto	6	5

Finals
1	(Spain) Coello / (Argentina) Tapia	4	6	6
4	(Argentina) Stupaczuk / (Spain) Yanguas	6	1	2

=== Women's Bracket ===
Round of 32
1	(Spain) A. Sánchez / (Spain) P. Josemaria	6	6
22	(Spain) M. Lobo / (Spain) S. Saiz	2	3
27	(Italy) G. Marchetti / (France) L. Godallier	6	2	1
9	(Spain) A. Alonso / (Spain) A. Ustero	4	6	6
14	(Spain) C. Mesa / (Spain) L. Martinez	6	5
26	(Spain) N. Aguilar / (Spain) T. Navarro	7	7
20	(Spain) J. Velasco / (Spain) N. Canovas	2	6
8	(Argentina) A. Osoro / (Spain) V. Virseda	6	7
5	(Spain) A. Salazar / (Spain) J. Castello	7	6	6
18	(Spain) E. Carnicero / (Spain) M. Merino	6	7	1
35	(Spain) A. Rojo / (Portugal) P. Ribeiro	1	1
13	(Italy) C. Orsi / (Spain) N. Rodriguez	6	6
10	(Spain) C. Goenaga / (Argentina) V. Riera	6	6
38	(Netherlands) M. Koek / (Spain) R. Lopez	1	2
Q	(Spain) A. Momha / (Spain) A. Ramos	2	0
4	(Spain) M. Ortega / (Portugal) S. Araújo	6	6
3	(Spain) B. Gonzalez / (Argentina) D. Brea	6	6
Q	(Spain) J. Cabruja / (Spain) L. Exposito	0	0
21	(Sweden) C. Navarro / (Spain) S. Ruiz	1	2
11	(Spain) B. Caldera / (Spain) L. Rufo	6	6
16	(France) A. Collombon / (Spain) A. Martinez	6	6
17	(Argentina) J. Bidahorria / (Spain) M. Talavan	3	1
25	(Spain) M. Barrera / (Spain) M. Caparros	6	6
6	(Spain) L. Sainz / (Spain) P. Llaguno	4	4
7	(Argentina) C. Jensen / (Spain) T. Icardo	6	6
28	(Spain) J. Bautista / (Spain) L. Arruabarrena	2	1
36	(Spain) M. Santamaria / (Spain) S. Pujals	7	4	2
12	(Spain) M. Guinart / (Spain) V. Iglesias	6	6	6
15	(Russia) K. Sharifova / (Spain) M. Marrero	6	6
24	(Spain) B. Las Heras / (Spain) S. Bellver	3	3
19	(Portugal) A. Nogueira / (Spain) M.R. Abajo	2	0
2	(Spain) C. Fernandez / (Spain) G. Triay	6	6

Round of 16
1	(Spain) A. Sánchez / (Spain) P. Josemaria	7	2	6
9	(Spain) A. Alonso / (Spain) A. Ustero	5	6	1
26	(Spain) N. Aguilar / (Spain) T. Navarro	3	4
8	(Argentina) A. Osoro / (Spain) V. Virseda	6	6
5	(Spain) A. Salazar / (Spain) J. Castello	6	6
13	(Italy) C. Orsi / (Spain) N. Rodriguez	2	3
10	(Spain) C. Goenaga / (Argentina) V. Riera	4	4
4	(Spain) M. Ortega / (Portugal) S. Araújo	6	6
3	(Spain) B. Gonzalez / (Argentina) D. Brea	6	6
16	(Spain) B. Caldera / (Spain) L. Rufo	4	2
16	(France) A. Collombon / (Spain) A. Martinez	6	4	6
25	(Spain) M. Barrera / (Spain) M. Caparros	4	6	4
7	(Argentina) C. Jensen / (Spain) T. Icardo	6	0	*
12	(Spain) M. Guinart / (Spain) V. Iglesias	1	0
15	(Russia) K. Sharifova / (Spain) M. Marrero	3	6	4
2	(Spain) C. Fernandez / (Spain) G. Triay	6	3	6

Quarter-Final
1	(Spain) A. Sánchez / (Spain) P. Josemaria	2	6	6
8	(Argentina) A. Osoro / (Spain) V. Virseda	6	2	2
5	(Spain) A. Salazar / (Spain) J. Castello	2	0
4	(Spain) M. Ortega / (Portugal) S. Araújo	6	6
3	(Spain) B. Gonzalez / (Argentina) D. Brea	6	6
25	(Spain) M. Barrera / (Spain) M. Caparros	2	2
7	(Argentina) C. Jensen / (Spain) T. Icardo	5	1
2	(Spain) C. Fernandez / (Spain) G. Triay	7	6

Semi-Finals
1	(Spain) A. Sánchez / (Spain) P. Josemaria	6	3	6
4	(Spain) M. Ortega / (Portugal) S. Araújo	3	6	7
3	(Spain) B. Gonzalez / (Argentina) D. Brea	5	2
2	(Spain) C. Fernandez / (Spain) G. Triay	7	6

Finals
1	(Spain) M. Ortega / (Portugal) S. Araújo	7	1	4
2	(Spain) C. Fernandez / (Spain) G. Triay	6	6	6

== Results ==
=== First Round ===
Men's

Date	Winners	Score	Opponent	Refs.
25/11/2024	(Spain) Pol Hernandez (Argentina) Ramiro Valenzuela	6–2 / 6–2	(Portugal) Antonio Luque (Spain) Toni Bueno	
26/11/2024	(Spain) Ignacio Sager (Spain) Salvador Oria	7–6 / 6–3	(France) Bastien Blanque (France) Johan Bergeron	
26/11/2024	(Spain) Alex Arroyo (Spain) Alex Ruiz	6–4 / 7–5	(Spain) Gonzalo Rubio (Spain) Pablo Lijó	
26/11/2024	(Spain) Jose Sanchez Serrano (Portugal) Pedro Araújo	6–2 / 6–3	(Mexico) Jose Pablo Padilla (Mexico) Juan Pablo Castillo	
26/11/2024	(Spain) Enrique Goenaga (Spain) Teodoro Zapata	6–4 / 6–4	(Spain) Guillermo Collado (Spain) Javier Martinez Vazquez	
26/11/2024	(Spain) Francisco Gil Morales (Spain) Juanlu Esbri	7–6 / 7–6	(Spain) Javi Ruiz (Spain) Victor Ruiz	
25/11/2024	(Spain) David Gala Sanchez (Spain) Jaime Muñoz	6–3 / 6–3	(Spain) Álvaro Melendez Amaya (Argentina) Cristian German Gutiérrez	
25/11/2024	(Spain) Alvero Cepero (Spain) Miguel Benítez	5–7 / 7–5 / 6–1	(Italy) Facundo Dominguez (Argentina) Ignacio Piotto	
25/11/2024	(Spain) Jose Solano Marmolejo (Spain) Victor Mena Gil	6–7 / 7–6 / 7–6	(Spain) Francisco Guerrero (Spain) Jairo Bautista	
25/11/2024	(Argentina) Lucho Capra (Argentina) Maxi Sánchez	6–4 / 6–4	(Spain) Candido Jorge Alfaro (Spain) Pablo Castillo Valverde	
25/11/2024	(Spain) Manuel Castaño (Italy) Nicolás Suescun	7–6 / 6–1	(Mexico) José Alvarez Torres (Mexico) Pablo Amora Hernandez	
26/11/2024	(Spain) Emilio Sanchez Chamero (Chile) Javier Valdes	6–3 / 6–4	(Spain) Andres Fernandez Lancha (Spain) Mario Ortega	
25/11/2024	(Portugal) Miguel Deus (Portugal) Nuno Deus	4–6 / 7–5 / 6–3	(Spain) Miguel Angel Solbes (Spain) Miguel Gonzalez García	
26/11/2024	(Spain) Anton Sans Riola (Spain) Ivan Ramirez	6–2 / 7–6	(Spain) Luis Hernandez Quesada (Argentina) Juan Cruz Belluati	
26/11/2024	(Argentina) Eduardo Agustin Torre (Spain) Gerard Arnaldos Serrano	7–6 / 0–6 / 6–4	(Argentina) Fernando Belasteguín (Argentina) Valentino Libaak	
25/11/2024	(Spain) Javi Leal (Brazil) Lucas Campagnolo	6–1 / 6–0	(Mexico) Diego Arredondo (Mexico) Luis Enrique Barrientos	
25/11/2024	(Spain) Javier García Mora (Spain) Javier Gonzalez Barahona	7–6 / 6–3	(Belgium) Clement Geens (France) Dylan Guichard	
26/11/2024	(United Arab Emirates) Arnau Ayats (Spain) Pablo García Rodrigo	6–2 / 6–4	(Spain) Ignacio Vilariño (Spain) Mario Del Castillo	
25/11/2024	(Sweden) Adam Axelsson (Sweden) Simon Vasquez	3–6 / 7–6 / 6–3	(Argentina) Juan Argañaras (Argentina) Matías Almada	
25/11/2024	(Spain) José Jimenez Casas (Spain) Pincho Fernandez	3–6 / 6–1 / 6–3	(Italy) Denis Perino (Spain) Jorge Ruiz Gutiérrez	
25/11/2024	(United Arab Emirates) Iñigo Jofre (Argentina) Juan Tello	4–6 / 7–6 / 6–1	(Spain) Fran Ramirez (Spain) Mario Huete	
26/11/2024	(Spain) Jose García Diestro (Argentina) Sanyo Gutiérrez	6–4 / 6–4	(Argentina) Agustin Gutiérrez (Spain) José Rico	
26/11/2024	(Italy) Aris Patiniotis (Spain) Jesus Moya	6–3 / 6–4	(Argentina) Federico Mouriño (Spain) Marc Quilez	
26/11/2024	(Spain) Daniel Santigosa (Argentina) Miguel Lamperti	6–4 / 7–5	(Spain) Carlos Marti (Spain) Pedro Melendez Amaya	

Women's

Date	Winners	Score	Opponent	Refs.
25/11/2024	(Spain) Marina Martinez Lobo (Spain) Sofía Saiz Vallejo	6–1 / 6–4	(Spain) Ariadna Cañellas (Spain) Marta Borrero	
26/11/2024	(Italy) Giorgia Marchetti (France) Lea Godallier	7–6 / 6–3	(Spain) Arantxa Soriano Perez (Spain) Letizia María Manquillo	
26/11/2024	(Spain) Noemi Aguilar (Spain) Teresa Navarro	6–3 / 6–2	(Spain) Ana Dominguez Gracia (France) Carla Touly	
26/11/2024	(Spain) Jimena Velasco (Spain) Noa Canovas	4–6 / 6–1 / 7–6	(Spain) Laura Lujan Rodriguez (Spain) Marta Arellano	
26/11/2024	(Spain) Esther Carnicero (Spain) Melania Merino Saez	6–3 / 6–7 / 6–2	(Spain) Agueda Perez (Spain) Patricia Martínez	
25/11/2024	(Spain) Alicia Blanco Rojo (Portugal) Patricia María Ribeiro	6–7 / 6–4 / 6–4	(Mexico) Camila Ramme Coellar (Mexico) Natalia Blanco	
26/11/2024	(Netherlands) Marcella Koek (Spain) Rebeca Lopez	6–1 / 4–6 / 6–4	(Spain) Lucía Fernandez Lopez (Spain) María Portillo Perez	
25/11/2024	(Spain) Alba Perez Momha (Spain) Ana Varo Ramos	7–6 / 6–1	(Mexico) Ana María Cabrejas (United States) Brittany Dubins	
25/11/2024	(Spain) Lucia Peralta Exposito (Spain) Jana Montes Cabruja	6–0 / 6–0	(Mexico) Emma Reyes Baca (Mexico) Luisa De la Peña	
25/11/2024	(Sweden) Carolina Navarro Björk (Spain) Sara Ruiz Soto	6–2 / 6–4	(Italy) Carlotta Casali (Italy) Lorena Vano	
26/11/2024	(Argentina) Julieta Bidahorria (Spain) Marta Talavan	6–1 / 6–4	(Brazil) Manuela Schuck (Spain) Mónica Gomez Rivas	
26/11/2024	(Spain) Marta Barrera (Spain) Marta Caparrós	2–6 / 6–4 / 6–4	(Argentina) Martina Fassio Goyeneche (Spain) Raquel Eugenio Barrera	
25/11/2024	(Spain) Julia Polo Bautista (Spain) Lara Arruabarrena	6–2 / 6–1	(Spain) Carla Castillo Velarde (Spain) Carmen Castillon Gamez	
25/11/2024	(Spain) Martina Calvo Santamaria (Spain) Sara Pujals	6–0 / 6–3	(Spain) Lucía García Trella (Spain) Natividad Lopez Díaz	
25/11/2024	(Spain) Barbara Las Heras (Spain) Sandra Bellver	4–6 / 6–1 / 6–4	(Spain) Candela Lucendo Millan (Italy) Marianela Montesi	
26/11/2024	(Portugal) Ana Catarina Nogueira (Spain) Laia Rodriguez Abajo	6–3 / 7–5	(Netherlands) Stephanie Weterings (United Kingdom) Tia Louisa Norton	

=== Round of 32 ===
Men's

Date	Winners	Score	Opponent	Refs.
27/11/2024	(Argentina) Agustín Tapia (Spain) Arturo Coello	6–1 / 6–2	(Spain) Pol Hernandez (Argentina) Ramiro Valenzuela	
27/11/2024	(Spain) Alex Arroyo (Spain) Alex Ruiz	6–4 / 6–2	(Spain) Ignacio Sager (Spain) Salvador Oria	
27/11/2024	(Spain) Enrique Goenaga (Spain) Teodoro Zapata	6–4 / 6–4	(Spain) Jose Sanchez Serrano (Portugal) Pedro Araújo	
27/11/2024	(Spain) Coki Nieto (Spain) Jon Sanz	6–4 / 6–3	(Spain) Francisco Gil Morales (Spain) Juanlu Esbri	
27/11/2024	(Spain) Eduardo Alonso (Spain) Momo Gonzalez	6–3 / 6–2	(Spain) David Gala Sanchez (Spain) Jaime Muñoz	
27/11/2024	(Spain) Alvero Cepero (Spain) Miguel Benítez	3–6 / 6–3 / 7–6	(Spain) Jose Solano Marmolejo (Spain) Victor Mena Gil	
27/11/2024	(Argentina) Lucho Capra (Argentina) Maxi Sánchez	6–4 / 6–2	(Spain) Manuel Castaño (Italy) Nicolás Suescun	
27/11/2024	(Spain) Juan Lebrón (Argentina) Martin Di Nenno	6–1 / 6–0	(Spain) Emilio Sanchez Chamero (Chile) Javier Valdes	
27/11/2024	(Argentina) Franco Stupaczuk (Spain) Mike Yanguas	6–4 / 6–3	(Portugal) Miguel Deus (Portugal) Nuno Deus	
27/11/2024	(Argentina) Eduardo Agustin Torre (Spain) Gerard Arnaldos Serrano	6–3 / 2–6 / 7–5	(Spain) Anton Sans Riola (Spain) Ivan Ramirez	
27/11/2024	(Spain) Javier García Mora (Spain) Javier Gonzalez Barahona	6–4 / 6–4	(Spain) Javi Leal (Brazil) Lucas Campagnolo	
27/11/2024	(Spain) Javi Garrido (Brazil) Lucas Bergamini	4–6 / 6–2 / 7–6	(United Arab Emirates) Arnau Ayats (Spain) Pablo García Rodrigo	
27/11/2024	(Spain) Pablo Cardona (Spain) Paquito Navarro	7–6 / 6–7 / 6–3	(Sweden) Adam Axelsson (Sweden) Simon Vasquez	
27/11/2024	(Spain) José Jimenez Casas (Spain) Pincho Fernandez	6–4 / 7–6	(United Arab Emirates) Iñigo Jofre (Argentina) Juan Tello	
27/11/2024	(Italy) Aris Patiniotis (Spain) Jesus Moya	6–4 / 6–1	(Spain) Jose García Diestro (Argentina) Sanyo Gutiérrez	
27/11/2024	(Spain) Alejandro Galán (Argentina) Federico Chingotto	6–2 / 6–2	(Spain) Daniel Santigosa (Argentina) Miguel Lamperti	

Women's

Date	Winners	Score	Opponent	Refs.
27/11/2024	(Spain) Ariana Sánchez (Spain) Paula Josemaria	6–2 / 6–3	(Spain) Marina Martinez Lobo (Spain) Sofía Saiz Vallejo	
27/11/2024	(Spain) Alejandra Alonso (Spain) Andrea Ustero	4–6 / 6–2 / 6–1	(Italy) Giorgia Marchetti (France) Lea Godallier	
27/11/2024	(Spain) Noemi Aguilar (Spain) Teresa Navarro	7–6 / 7–5	(Spain) Carla Mesa (Spain) Lucía Martínez Gomez	
27/11/2024	(Argentina) Aranzazu Osoro (Spain) Veronica Virseda	6–2 / 7–6	(Spain) Jimena Velasco (Spain) Noa Canovas	
27/11/2024	(Spain) Alejandra Salazar (Spain) Jessica Castelló	7–6 / 6–7 / 6–1	(Spain) Esther Carnicero (Spain) Melania Merino Saez	
27/11/2024	(Italy) Carolina Orsi (Spain) Nuria Rodriguez	6–1 / 6–1	(Spain) Alicia Blanco Rojo (Portugal) Patricia María Ribeiro	
27/11/2024	(Spain) Carmen Goenaga (Argentina) Virginia Riera	6–1 / 6–2	(Netherlands) Marcella Koek (Spain) Rebeca Lopez	
27/11/2024	(Spain) Marta Ortega (Portugal) Sofia Araújo	6–2 / 6–0	(Spain) Alba Perez Momha (Spain) Ana Varo Ramos	
27/11/2024	(Spain) Bea González (Argentina) Delfina Brea	6–0 / 6–0	(Spain) Lucia Peralta Exposito (Spain) Jana Montes Cabruja	
27/11/2024	(Spain) Beatriz Caldera (Spain) Lorena Rufo	6–1 / 6–2	(Sweden) Carolina Navarro Björk (Spain) Sara Ruiz Soto	
27/11/2024	(France) Alix Collombon (Spain) Araceli Martinez	6–3 / 6–1	(Argentina) Julieta Bidahorria (Spain) Marta Talavan	
27/11/2024	(Spain) Marta Barrera (Spain) Marta Caparrós	6–4 / 6–4	(Spain) Lucia Sainz (Spain) Patricia Llaguno	
27/11/2024	(Argentina) Claudia Jensen (Spain) Tamara Icardo	6–2 / 6–1	(Spain) Julia Polo Bautista (Spain) Lara Arruabarrena	
27/11/2024	(Spain) Marina Guinart (Spain) Victoria Iglesias	6–7 / 6–4 / 6–2	(Spain) Martina Calvo Santamaria (Spain) Sara Pujals	
27/11/2024	(Russia) Ksenia Sharifova (Spain) Marta Marrero	6–3 / 6–3	(Spain) Barbara Las Heras (Spain) Sandra Bellver	
27/11/2024	(Spain) Claudia Fernandéz; Gemma Triay	6–2 / 6–0	(Portugal) Ana Catarina Nogueira (Spain) Laia Rodriguez Abajo	

=== Round of 16 ===
Men's

Date	Winners	Score	Opponent	Refs.
28/11/2024	(Argentina) Agustín Tapia (Spain) Arturo Coello	6–3 / 6–4	(Spain) Alex Arroyo (Spain) Alex Ruiz	
28/11/2024	(Spain) Coki Nieto (Spain) Jon Sanz	6–2 / 6–3	(Spain) Enrique Goenaga (Spain) Teodoro Zapata	
28/11/2024	(Spain) Eduardo Alonso (Spain) Momo Gonzalez	6–4 / 6–1	(Spain) Alvero Cepero (Spain) Miguel Benítez	
28/11/2024	(Spain) Juan Lebrón (Argentina) Martin Di Nenno	6–3 / 6–3	(Argentina) Lucho Capra (Argentina) Maxi Sánchez	
28/11/2024	(Argentina) Franco Stupaczuk (Spain) Mike Yanguas	6–3 / 6–2	(Argentina) Eduardo Agustin Torre (Spain) Gerard Arnaldos Serrano	
28/11/2024	(Spain) Javier García Mora (Spain) Javier Gonzalez Barahona	6–2 / 1–6 / 7–6	(Spain) Javi Garrido (Brazil) Lucas Bergamini	
28/11/2024	(Spain) José Jimenez Casas (Spain) Pincho Fernandez	W.O.	(Spain) Pablo Cardona (Spain) Paquito Navarro	
28/11/2024	(Spain) Alejandro Galán (Argentina) Federico Chingotto	6–4 / 6–3	(Italy) Aris Patiniotis (Spain) Jesus Moya	

Women's

Date	Winners	Score	Opponent	Refs.
28/11/2024	(Spain) Ariana Sánchez (Spain) Paula Josemaria	7–5 / 2–6 / 6–1	(Spain) Alejandra Alonso (Spain) Andrea Ustero	
28/11/2024	(Argentina) Aranzazu Osoro (Spain) Veronica Virseda	6–3 / 6–4	(Spain) Noemi Aguilar (Spain) Teresa Navarro	
28/11/2024	(Spain) Alejandra Salazar (Spain) Jessica Castelló	6–2 / 6–3	(Italy) Carolina Orsi (Spain) Nuria Rodriguez	
28/11/2024	(Spain) Marta Ortega (Portugal) Sofia Araújo	6–4 / 6–4	(Spain) Carmen Goenaga (Argentina) Virginia Riera	
28/11/2024	(Spain) Bea González (Argentina) Delfina Brea	6–4 / 6–2	(Spain) Beatriz Caldera (Spain) Lorena Rufo	
28/11/2024	(France) Alix Collombon (Spain) Araceli Martinez	6–4 / 4–6 / 6–4	(Spain) Marta Barrera (Spain) Marta Caparrós	
28/11/2024	(Argentina) Claudia Jensen (Spain) Tamara Icardo	6–1 / W.O.	(Spain) Marina Guinart (Spain) Victoria Iglesias	
28/11/2024	(Spain) Claudia Fernandéz; Gemma Triay	6–3 / 3–6 / 6–4	(Russia) Ksenia Sharifova (Spain) Marta Marrero	

=== Quarter-Finals ===
Men's

Date	Winners	Score	Opponent	Refs.
29/11/2024	(Argentina) Agustín Tapia (Spain) Arturo Coello	6–4 / 6–3	(Spain) Coki Nieto (Spain) Jon Sanz	
29/11/2024	(Spain) Juan Lebrón (Argentina) Martin Di Nenno	6–3 / 6–3	(Spain) Eduardo Alonso (Spain) Momo Gonzalez	
29/11/2024	(Argentina) Franco Stupaczuk (Spain) Mike Yanguas	7–5 / 6–4	(Spain) Javier García Mora (Spain) Javier Gonzalez Barahona	
29/11/2024	(Spain) Alejandro Galán (Argentina) Federico Chingotto	6–2 / 6–1	(Spain) José Jimenez Casas (Spain) Pincho Fernandez	

Women's

Date	Winners	Score	Opponent	Refs.
29/11/2024	(Spain) Ariana Sánchez (Spain) Paula Josemaria	2–6 / 6–2 / 6–2	(Argentina) Aranzazu Osoro (Spain) Veronica Virseda	
29/11/2024	(Spain) Marta Ortega (Portugal) Sofia Araújo	6–2 / 6–0	(Spain) Alejandra Salazar (Spain) Jessica Castelló	
29/11/2024	(Spain) Bea González (Argentina) Delfina Brea	6–2 / 6–2	(France) Alix Collombon (Spain) Araceli Martinez	
29/11/2024	(Spain) Claudia Fernandéz; Gemma Triay	7–5 / 6–1	(Argentina) Claudia Jensen (Spain) Tamara Icardo	

=== Semi-Finals ===
Men's

Date	Winners	Score	Opponent	Refs.
30/11/2024	(Argentina) Agustín Tapia (Spain) Arturo Coello	6–3 / 3–6 / 7–6	(Spain) Juan Lebrón (Argentina) Martin Di Nenno	
30/11/2024	(Argentina) Franco Stupaczuk (Spain) Mike Yanguas	7–6 / 7–5	(Spain) Alejandro Galán (Argentina) Federico Chingotto	

Women's

Date	Winners	Score	Opponent	Refs.
30/11/2024	(Spain) Marta Ortega (Portugal) Sofia Araújo	3–6 / 6–3 / 7–6	(Spain) Ariana Sánchez (Spain) Paula Josemaria	
30/11/2024	(Spain) Claudia Fernandéz; Gemma Triay	7–5 / 6–2	(Spain) Bea González (Argentina) Delfina Brea	

=== Finals ===
Men's

Date	Winners	Score	Opponent	Refs.
1/12/2024	(Argentina) Agustín Tapia (Spain) Arturo Coello	4–6 / 6–1 / 6–2	(Argentina) Franco Stupaczuk (Spain) Mike Yanguas	

Women's

Date	Winners	Score	Opponent	Refs.
1/12/2024	(Spain) Claudia Fernandéz; Gemma Triay	6–7 / 6–1 / 6–4	(Spain) Marta Ortega (Portugal) Sofia Araújo	
