= 2024 Kuwait City P1 =

Padel championships

- Date: 9 – 17 November
- Edition: 1st
- Category: P1
- Prize money: €470.000
- Location: Kuwait City, Kuwait
- Venue: The Arena Kuwait

Champions
- Men's doubles: (Argentina) Agustín Tapia (Spain) Arturo Coello
- Women's doubles: (Spain) Ariana Sánchez (Spain) Paula Josemaría

Chronology

The 2024 Kuwait City P1 (officially 2024 Kuwait City Premier Padel P1) was the twenty-first tournament of the third season organized by Premier Padel, promoted by the International Padel Federation, and with the financial backing of Nasser Al-Khelaïfi's Qatar Sports Investments, now serving as the premier padel circuit.

In the women's category, the two top-ranked pairs faced each other in a final for the fifth time, with a 5–5 head-to-head record overall. The world number ones Ariana Sánchez and Paula Josemaría defeated the number twos, Claudia Fernández and Gemma Triay, to claim their ninth title of the season.

In the men's category, for the third time this season, with all the top-ranked pairs present, the number 1 and 2 seeds did not face each other in the final. The No. 1s Agustín Tapia and Arturo Coello, playing in their 16th final of the season, faced and ddefeated the number 4 seeds Franco Stupaczuk and Mike Yanguas, claiming their 11th title of 2024.

== Relevant Data ==
=== Crowned Number 1s and a historic record ===
With their tournament victory, the world number ones Ariana Sánchez and Paula Josemaría secured their 36th title as a pair, the ninth of 2024, and mathematically guaranteed finishing the year as the world's top-ranked pair. By finishing as the first ranked they successfully defended the women's padel crown for the second consecutive year (2023 and 2024), and with their 36th trophy as a pair, they tied the team of Fernando Belasteguín and Pablo Lima as the second most successful partnership of all time.

=== First absence of the number twos in the finals ===
With Alejandro Galán and Federico Chingotto semifnals loss to Franco Stupaczuk and Mike Yanguas, the Spanish-Argentine duo failed to reach the finals for the first time. Since forming their partnership at the Puerto Cabello P2 'Chingalán' had reached 14 consecutive finals, surpassing the record of 12 finals set by Fernando Belasteguín and Pablo Lima in 2016.

Agustín Tapia and Arturo Coello, who missed the finals only once in the Seville P2, by reaching the last matchday also matched Belasteguín and Lima record with 12 consecutive finals.

== Seeds ==
Male

Rnk.	Team	FIP Ranking Points
1	(Argentina) Agustín Tapia (Spain) Arturo Coello	30471
2	(Spain) Alejandro Galán (Argentina) Federico Chingotto	23321
3	(Spain) Juan Lebrón (Argentina) Martin Di Nenno	15083
4	(Argentina) Franco Stupaczuk (Spain) Miguel Yanguas	12775
5	(Spain) Pablo Cardona (Spain) Paquito Navarro	8355
6	(Spain) Coki Nieto (Spain) Jon Sanz	7690
7	(Spain) Eduardo Alonso (Spain) Momo Gonzalez	7305
8	(Spain) Javi Garrido (Brazil) Lucas Bergamini	7259
9	(Spain) Alejandro Arroyo (Spain) Alejandro Ruiz	5290
10	(Argentina) Fernando Belasteguín (Argentina) Valentino Libaak	4158
11	(Spain) Jose Garcia Diestro (Argentina) Sanyo Gutiérrez	4127
12	(Argentina) Lucho Capra (Argentina) Maxi Sanchéz	3948
13	(United Arab Emirates) Inigo Jofre (Argentina) Juan Tello	3629
14	(Spain) Javier Leal (Brazil) Lucas Campagnolo	3373
15	(Argentina) Alex Chozas (Argentina) Leandro Augsburguer	3343
16	(Spain) Javier Ruiz (Spain) Victor Ruiz	3181

Female

Rnk.	Team	FIP Ranking Points
1	(Spain) Ariana Sánchez (Spain) Paula Josemaria	28852
2	(Spain) Claudia Fernandez (Spain) Gemma Triay	18598
3	(Spain) Beatriz Gonzalez (Argentina) Delfina Brea	14503
4	(Spain) Marta Ortega (Portugal) Sofia Araújo	11639
5	(Spain) Alejandra Salazar (Spain) Jessica Castello	10450
6	(Spain) Lucia Sainz (Spain) Patricia Llaguno	9953
7	(Argentina) Claudia Jensen (Spain) Tamara Icardo	8732
8	(Argentina) Aranzazu Osoro (Spain) Veronica Virseda	7758
9	(Spain) Alejandra Alonso (Spain) Andrea Ustero	6496
10	(Spain) Carmen Goenaga (Argentina) Virginia Riera	5441
11	(Spain) Beatriz Caldera (Spain) Lorena Rufo	3807
12	(Italy) Carolina Orsi (Spain) Nuria Rodriguez	3487
13	(Spain) Marina Guinart (Spain) Victoria Iglesias	3402
14	(Spain) Carla Mesa (Spain) Lucia Martinez Gomez	3138
15	(Russia) Ksenia Sharifova (Spain) Marta Marrero	2872
16	(France) Alix Collombon (Spain) Araceli Martinez	2732

== Head-to-head record between teams ranked in the top 4 during the season ==
=== Man's ===
Record	Coello–Tapia	Galán–Chingotto	Lebrón–Di Nenno	Stupaczuk–Yanguas	Former Pairs	Galán–Lebrón	Paquito–Sanyo	Lebrón–Paquito	Di Nenno–Stupaczuk
Coello–Tapia	—	9–5	3–0	2–0		1–1	2–0	4–0	1–0
Galán–Chingotto	5–9	—	1–0	2–1		—	—	1–0	7–0
Lebrón–Di Nenno	0–3	0–1	—	—		—	—	—	—
Stupaczuk–Yanguas	0–2	1–2	—	—		—	—	—	—
Former Pairs									
Galán–Lebrón	1–1	—	—	—		—	—	—	2–0
Paquito–Sanyo	0–2	—	—	—		—	—	—	—
Lebrón–Paquito	0–4	0–1	—	—		—	—	—	0–1
Di Nenno–Stupaczuk	0–1	0–7	—	—		0–2	—	1–0	—

=== Women's ===
Record	Ariana–Paula	Fernandez–Triay	Gonzalez–D. Brea	Araújo–Ortega	Former Pairs	Icardo–Salazar	Ortega–Triay	Ortega–Virseda
Ariana–Paula	—	6–5	3–1	3–1		1–0	—	1–0
Fernandez–Triay	5–6	—	3–3	1–0		0–1	—	1–0
B. Gonzalez–D. Brea	1–3	3–3	—	1–0		3–0	—	—
Araújo–Ortega	1–3	0–1	0–1	—		—	—	—
Former Pairs								
Icardo–Salazar	0–1	1–0	0–3	—		—	—	—
Ortega–Triay	—	—	—	—		—	—	—
Ortega–Virseda	0–1	0–1	—	—		—	—	—

Matchups involving Andrea Ustero and Delfina Brea, and subsequently Delfina Brea and Lucia Sainz, are not included, as these were merely temporary pairings that lasted for a total of three tournaments while Bea González was recovering from an injury.

== Draws ==
=== Men's Bracket ===
Round of 32
1	(Spain) Coello / (Argentina) Tapia	6	6
28	(Italy) F. Dominguez / (Spain) E. Chamero	3	4
29	(Argentina) F. Mouriño / (Spain) M. Quilez	4	4
12	(Argentina) L. Capra / (Argentina) Maxi	6	6
15	(Argentina) A. Chozas / (Argentina) L. Augsburger	6	2
20	(Spain) G. Rubio / (Spain) P. Lijó	7	6
30	(Italy) A. Patiniotis / (Spain) J. Moya	4	2
8	(Spain) J. Garrido / (Brazil) L. Bergamini	6	6
6	(Spain) Coki / (Spain) J. Sanz	6	6
21	(Spain) I. Sager / (Spain) S. Oria	3	2
Q	(Spain) D. Gil Batista / (Spain) R. Mendez	4	3
10	(Argentina) Belasteguín / (Argentina) V. Libaak	6	6
16	(Spain) J. Ruiz / (Spain) V. Ruiz	3	4
17	(Spain) F. Guerrero / (Spain) J. Bautista	6	6
18	(Spain) F. Gil / (Spain) J. Esbri	1	1
3	(Argentina) Di Nenno / (Spain) Lebrón	6	6
4	(Argentina) Stupaczuk / (Spain) Yanguas	6	6
37	(Argentina) E. Torre / (Chile) J. Valdes	1	2
Q	(Spain) A. Lopez / (Spain) C. Cabeza	0	3
14	(Spain) J. Leal / (Brazil) L. Campagnolo	6	6
13	(United Arab Emirates) I. Jofre / (Argentina) J. Tello	6	4	7
Q	(Spain) P.H. Alvarez / (Argentina) R. Valenzuela	3	6	5
26	(Argentina) A. Gutiérrez / (Spain) J. Rico	0	2
7	(Spain) E. Alonso / (Spain) Momo	6	6
5	(Spain) Paquito / (Spain) P. Cardona	7	6
31	(United Arab Emirates) A. Ayats / (Spain) P.G. Rodrigo	6	2
23	(Spain) J. Barahona / (Spain) T. Zapata	6	6	7
9	(Spain) A. Arroyo / (Spain) A. Ruiz	4	7	5
11	(Spain) J.G. Diestro / (Argentina) Sanyo	6	6	6
36	(Spain) D. Sastre / (Argentina) Lamperti	4	7	3
Q	(Portugal) M. Deus / (Portugal) N. Deus	6	6	3
2	(Spain) Galán / (Argentina) Chingotto	7	4	6

Round of 16
1	(Spain) Coello / (Argentina) Tapia	6	6
12	(Argentina) L. Capra / (Argentina) Maxi	2	1
20	(Spain) G. Rubio / (Spain) P. Lijó	4	0
8	(Spain) J. Garrido / (Brazil) L. Bergamini	6	6
6	(Spain) Coki / (Spain) J. Sanz	6	7	6
10	(Argentina) Belasteguín / (Argentina) V. Libaak	7	6	4
17	(Spain) F. Guerrero / (Spain) J. Bautista	7	6
3	(Argentina) Di Nenno / (Spain) Lebrón	5	2
4	(Argentina) Stupaczuk / (Spain) Yanguas	6	6	6
14	(Spain) J. Leal / (Brazil) L. Campagnolo	7	1	4
13	(United Arab Emirates) I. Jofre / (Argentina) J. Tello	4	7	6
7	(Spain) E. Alonso / (Spain) Momo	6	5	3
5	(Spain) Paquito / (Spain) P. Cardona	4	6	6
23	(Spain) J. Barahona / (Spain) T. Zapata	6	1	3
11	(Spain) J.G. Diestro / (Argentina) Sanyo	3	6
2	(Spain) Galán / (Argentina) Chingotto	6	6

Quarter-Final
1	(Spain) Coello / (Argentina) Tapia	7	5	6
8	(Spain) J. Garrido / (Brazil) L. Bergamini	5	7	1
6	(Spain) Coki / (Spain) J. Sanz	4	4
17	(Spain) F. Guerrero / (Spain) J. Bautista	6	6
4	(Argentina) Stupaczuk / (Spain) Yanguas	6	4	6
13	(United Arab Emirates) I. Jofre / (Argentina) J. Tello	1	6	2
5	(Spain) Paquito / (Spain) P. Cardona	2	4
2	(Spain) Galán / (Argentina) Chingotto	6	6

Semi-Finals
1	(Spain) Coello / (Argentina) Tapia	6	6
17	(Spain) F. Guerrero / (Spain) J. Bautista	2	2
4	(Argentina) Stupaczuk / (Spain) Yanguas	6	6
2	(Spain) Galán / (Argentina) Chingotto	3	1

Finals
1	(Spain) Coello / (Argentina) Tapia	6	6
4	(Argentina) Stupaczuk / (Spain) Yanguas	4	2

=== Women's Bracket ===
Round of 32
1	(Spain) A. Sánchez / (Spain) P. Josemaria	6	6
9	(Spain) A. Alonso / (Spain) A. Ustero	0	2
10	(Spain) C. Goenaga / (Argentina) V. Riera	6	4	6
Q	(Argentina) M. Goyeneche / (Spain) R. Barrera	3	6	7
Q	(Spain) M. Santamaria / (Spain) S. Pujals	3	4
17	(Argentina) J. Bidahorria / (Spain) M. Talavan	6	6
13	(Spain) M. Guinart / (Spain) V. Iglesias	1	1
8	(Argentina) A. Osoro / (Spain) V. Virseda	6	6
5	(Spain) A. Salazar / (Spain) J. Castello	7	6
22	(Spain) M. Lobo / (Spain) S. Saiz	5	3
14	(Spain) C. Mesa / (Spain) L. Martinez	6	6
20	(Spain) J. Velasco / (Spain) N. Canovas	1	1
23	(Spain) B. Las Heras / (Spain) S. Bellver	1	2
26	(Spain) M. Barrera / (Spain) M. Caparros	6	6
Q	(Spain) J. Bautista / (Spain) L. Arruabarrena	3	1
4	(Spain) M. Ortega / (Portugal) S. Araújo	6	6
3	(Spain) B. Gonzalez / (Argentina) D. Brea	6	6
12	(Italy) C. Orsi / (Spain) N. Rodriguez	3	3
19	(Portugal) A. Nogueira / (Spain) M.R. Abajo	6	6
Q	(Italy) C. Casali / (Italy) L. Vano	4	1
WC	(Kuwait) M. Alsarraj / (Spain) S. Vidal	0	0
24	(Spain) A. Rojo / (Spain) Sara Ruiz	6	6
15	(Russia) K. Sharifova / (Spain) M. Marrero	2	4
7	(Argentina) C. Jensen / (Spain) T. Icardo	6	6
6	(Spain) L. Sainz / (Spain) P. Llaguno	6	6
27	(Italy) C. Pappacena / (Italy) G. Marchetti	2	1
11	(Spain) B. Caldera / (Spain) L. Rufo	6	6
16	(France) A. Collombon / (Spain) A. Martinez	1	3
21	(Spain) A. Perez / (Spain) P. Martinez	2	4
18	(Spain) E. Carnicero / (Spain) M. Merino	6	6
26	(Spain) N. Aguilar / (Spain) T. Navarro	1	0
2	(Spain) C. Fernandez / (Spain) G. Triay	6	6

Round of 16
1	(Spain) A. Sánchez / (Spain) P. Josemaria	6	7
Q	(Argentina) M. Goyeneche / (Spain) R. Barrera	1	6
17	(Argentina) J. Bidahorria / (Spain) M. Talavan	2	0
8	(Argentina) A. Osoro / (Spain) V. Virseda	6	6
5	(Spain) A. Salazar / (Spain) J. Castello	6	7
14	(Spain) C. Mesa / (Spain) L. Martinez	2	5
26	(Spain) M. Barrera / (Spain) M. Caparros	2	2
4	(Spain) M. Ortega / (Portugal) S. Araújo	6	6
3	(Spain) B. Gonzalez / (Argentina) D. Brea	6	6
19	(Portugal) A. Nogueira / (Spain) M.R. Abajo	0	3
24	(Spain) A. Rojo / (Spain) Sara Ruiz	1	1
7	(Argentina) C. Jensen / (Spain) T. Icardo	6	6
6	(Spain) L. Sainz / (Spain) P. Llaguno	2	4
11	(Spain) B. Caldera / (Spain) L. Rufo	6	6
18	(Spain) E. Carnicero / (Spain) M. Merino	3	2
2	(Spain) C. Fernandez / (Spain) G. Triay	6	6

Quarter-Final
1	(Spain) A. Sánchez / (Spain) P. Josemaria	6	6
8	(Argentina) A. Osoro / (Spain) V. Virseda	4	2
5	(Spain) A. Salazar / (Spain) J. Castello	4	3
4	(Spain) M. Ortega / (Portugal) S. Araújo	6	6
3	(Spain) B. Gonzalez / (Argentina) D. Brea	6	6	6
7	(Argentina) C. Jensen / (Spain) T. Icardo	2	7	3
11	(Spain) B. Caldera / (Spain) L. Rufo	5	0
2	(Spain) C. Fernandez / (Spain) G. Triay	7	6

Semi-Finals
1	(Spain) A. Sánchez / (Spain) P. Josemaria	7	6
4	(Spain) M. Ortega / (Portugal) S. Araújo	6	1
3	(Spain) B. Gonzalez / (Argentina) D. Brea	0	2
2	(Spain) C. Fernandez / (Spain) G. Triay	6	6

Finals
1	(Spain) A. Sánchez / (Spain) P. Josemaria	7	7
2	(Spain) C. Fernandez / (Spain) G. Triay	5	6

== Results ==
=== First Round ===
Men's

Date	Winners	Score	Opponent	Refs.
11/11/2024	(Spain) Emilio Sanchez Chamero (Italy) Facundo Dominguez	6–0 / 6–2	(Kuwait) Abdulaziz Redha (Spain) Javier Navarro Perez	
11/11/2024	(Argentina) Federico Mouriño (Spain) Marc Quilez	6–7 / 6–4 / 6–1	(Spain) Ignacio Vilariño (Spain) Mario Del Castillo	
11/11/2024	(Spain) Gonzalo Rubio (Spain) Pablo Lijó	6–3 / 7–6	(Spain) Alonso Rodriguez (Spain) Gerard Arnaldos	
11/11/2024	(Italy) Aris Patiniotis (Spain) Jesus Moya	6–1 / 6–2	(Kuwait) Abdulrahman Alawadhi (Argentina) Facundo Erguy	
11/11/2024	(Spain) Ignacio Sager (Spain) Salvador Oria	6–4 / 6–4	(Spain) Luis Hernandez Quesada (Spain) Javi Rico	
11/11/2024	(Spain) Diego Gil Batista (Spain) Rafael Mendez	7–6 / 6–4	(Spain) Alvero Cepero (Spain) Miguel Benítez	
11/11/2024	(Spain) Francisco Guerrero (Spain) Jairo Bautista	6–3 / 6–3	(Italy) Denis Perino (Spain) Jorge Ruiz Gutiérrez	
11/11/2024	(Spain) Francisco Gil Morales (Spain) Juanlu Esbri	6–0 / 6–2	(Spain) Ivan Ramirez (Spain) Jose Solano Marmolejo	
11/11/2024	(Argentina) Agustin Torre (Chile) Javier Valdes	4–6 / 6–3 / 3–1	(Argentina) Juan Cruz Belluati (Argentina) Ramiro Moyano	
11/11/2024	(Spain) Adrian Ronco Lopez (Spain) Carlos Perez Cabeza	6–0 / 6–2	(Qatar) Abdulla Alhijji (Qatar) Mohammed Saadon Alkuwari	
11/11/2024	(Spain) Pol Hernandez (Argentina) Ramiro Valenzuela	6–2 / 7–5	(Spain) Álvaro Melendez Amaya (Argentina) Cristian German Gutiérrez	
11/11/2024	(Argentina) Agustin Gutiérrez (Spain) José Rico	7–6 / 7–5	(Spain) David Gala Sanchez (Spain) Jaime Muñoz	
11/11/2024	(United Arab Emirates) Arnau Ayats (Spain) Pablo García Rodrigo	6–1 / 7–6	(Spain) Enrique Goenaga (Spain) Teodoro Zapata	
11/11/2024	(Spain) Javier García Mora (Spain) Javier Gonzalez Barahona	6–3 / 7–6	(Spain) Alvaro Montiel (France) Thomas Leygue	
11/11/2024	(Spain) Daniel Santigosa (Argentina) Miguel Lamperti	6–2 / 6–3	(Spain) José Jimenez Casas (Spain) Pincho Fernandez	
11/11/2024	(Portugal) Miguel Deus (Portugal) Nuno Deus	6–4 / 6–2	(Portugal) Pedro Araújo (Spain) Victor Mena Gil	

=== Round of 32 ===
Men's

Date	Winners	Score	Opponent	Refs.
13/11/2024	(Argentina) Agustín Tapia (Spain) Arturo Coello	6–3 / 6–4	(Spain) Emilio Sanchez Chamero (Italy) Facundo Dominguez	
12/11/2024	(Argentina) Lucho Capra (Argentina) Maxi Sánchez	6–4 / 6–4	(Argentina) Federico Mouriño (Spain) Marc Quilez	
12/11/2024	(Spain) Gonzalo Rubio (Spain) Pablo Lijó	7–6 / 6–2	(Argentina) Alex Chozas (Argentina) Leandro Augsburger	
12/11/2024	(Spain) Javi Garrido (Brazil) Lucas Bergamini	6–4 / 6–2	(Italy) Aris Patiniotis (Spain) Jesus Moya	
13/11/2024	(Spain) Coki Nieto (Spain) Jon Sanz	6–3 / 6–2	(Spain) Ignacio Sager (Spain) Salvador Oria	
12/11/2024	(Argentina) Fernando Belasteguín (Argentina) Valentino Libaak	6–4 / 6–3	(Spain) Diego Gil Batista (Spain) Rafael Mendez	
12/11/2024	(Spain) Francisco Guerrero (Spain) Jairo Bautista	6–3 / 6–4	(Spain) Javi Ruiz (Spain) Victor Ruiz	
13/11/2024	(Spain) Juan Lebrón (Argentina) Martin Di Nenno	6–1 / 6–1	(Spain) Francisco Gil Morales (Spain) Juanlu Esbri	
13/11/2024	(Argentina) Franco Stupaczuk (Spain) Mike Yanguas	6–1 / 6–2	(Argentina) Agustin Torre (Chile) Javier Valdes	
12/11/2024	(Spain) Javi Leal (Brazil) Lucas Campagnolo	6–0 / 6–3	(Spain) Adrian Ronco Lopez (Spain) Carlos Perez Cabeza	
12/11/2024	(United Arab Emirates) Iñigo Jofre (Argentina) Juan Tello	6–3 / 4–6 / 7–5	(Spain) Pol Hernandez (Argentina) Ramiro Valenzuela	
13/11/2024	(Spain) Eduardo Alonso (Spain) Momo Gonzalez	6–0 / 6–2	(Argentina) Agustin Gutiérrez (Spain) José Rico	
13/11/2024	(Spain) Pablo Cardona (Spain) Paquito Navarro	7–6 / 6–2	(United Arab Emirates) Arnau Ayats (Spain) Pablo García Rodrigo	
13/11/2024	(Spain) Javier García Mora (Spain) Javier Gonzalez Barahona	6–4 / 6–7 / 7–5	(Spain) Alex Arroyo (Spain) Alex Ruiz	
12/11/2024	(Spain) Jose García Diestro (Argentina) Sanyo Gutiérrez	6–4 / 6–7 / 6–3	(Spain) Daniel Santigosa (Argentina) Miguel Lamperti	
13/11/2024	(Spain) Alejandro Galán (Argentina) Federico Chingotto	7–6 / 4–6 / 6–3	(Portugal) Miguel Deus (Portugal) Nuno Deus	

Women's

Date	Winners	Score	Opponent	Refs.
13/11/2024	(Spain) Ariana Sánchez (Spain) Paula Josemaria	6–0 / 6–2	(Spain) Alejandra Alonso (Spain) Andrea Ustero	
13/11/2024	(Argentina) Martina Fassio Goyeneche (Spain) Raquel Eugenio Barrera	3–6 / 6–4 / 7–6	(Spain) Carmen Goenaga (Argentina) Virginia Riera	
12/11/2024	(Argentina) Julieta Bidahorria (Spain) Marta Talavan	6–3 / 6–4	(Spain) Martina Calvo (Spain) Sara Pujals	
12/11/2024	(Argentina) Aranzazu Osoro (Spain) Veronica Virseda	6–1 / 6–1	(Spain) Marina Guinart (Spain) Victoria Iglesias	
12/11/2024	(Spain) Alejandra Salazar (Spain) Jessica Castelló	7–5 / 6–3	(Spain) Marina Martinez Lobo (Spain) Sofía Saiz Vallejo	
12/11/2024	(Spain) Carla Mesa (Spain) Lucía Martínez Gomez	6–1 / 6–1	(Spain) Jimena Velasco (Spain) Noa Canovas	
13/11/2024	(Spain) Marta Barrera (Spain) Marta Caparrós	6–1 / 6–2	(Spain) Barbara Las Heras (Spain) Sandra Bellver	
13/11/2024	(Spain) Marta Ortega (Portugal) Sofia Araújo	6–3 / 6–1	(Spain) Julia Polo Bautista (Spain) Lara Arruabarrena	
13/11/2024	(Spain) Bea González (Argentina) Delfina Brea	6–3 / 6–3	(Italy) Carolina Orsi (Spain) Nuria Rodriguez	
13/11/2024	(Portugal) Ana Catarina Nogueira (Spain) Laia Rodriguez Abajo	6–4 / 6–1	(Italy) Carlotta Casali (Italy) Lorena Vano	
12/11/2024	(Spain) Alicia Blanco Rojo (Spain) Sara Ruiz Soto	6–0 / 6–0	(Kuwait) Mariam Alsarraj (Spain) Silvia Lopez Vidal	
12/11/2024	(Argentina) Claudia Jensen (Spain) Tamara Icardo	6–2 / 6–4	(Russia) Ksenia Sharifova (Spain) Marta Marrero	
12/11/2024	(Spain) Lucia Sainz (Spain) Patricia Llaguno	6–2 / 6–1	(Italy) Chiara Pappacena (Italy) Giorgia Marchetti	
12/11/2024	(Spain) Beatriz Caldera (Spain) Lorena Rufo	6–1 / 6–3	(France) Alix Collombon (Spain) Araceli Martinez	
13/11/2024	(Spain) Esther Carnicero (Spain) Melania Merino Saez	6–2 / 6–4	(Spain) Agueda Perez (Spain) Patricia Martínez	
13/11/2024	(Spain) Claudia Fernandéz; Gemma Triay	6–1 / 6–0	(Spain) Noemi Aguilar (Spain) Teresa Navarro	

=== Round of 16 ===
Men's

Date	Winners	Score	Opponent	Refs.
14/11/2024	(Argentina) Agustín Tapia (Spain) Arturo Coello	6–2 / 6–1	(Argentina) Lucho Capra (Argentina) Maxi Sánchez	
14/11/2024	(Spain) Javi Garrido (Brazil) Lucas Bergamini	6–4 / 6–0	(Spain) Gonzalo Rubio (Spain) Pablo Lijó	
14/11/2024	(Spain) Coki Nieto (Spain) Jon Sanz	6–7 / 7–6 / 6–4	(Argentina) Fernando Belasteguín (Argentina) Valentino Libaak	
14/11/2024	(Spain) Francisco Guerrero (Spain) Jairo Bautista	7–5 / 6–2	(Spain) Juan Lebrón (Argentina) Martin Di Nenno	
14/11/2024	(Argentina) Franco Stupaczuk (Spain) Mike Yanguas	6–7 / 6–1 / 6–4	(Spain) Javi Leal (Brazil) Lucas Campagnolo	
14/11/2024	(United Arab Emirates) Iñigo Jofre (Argentina) Juan Tello	4–6 / 7–5 / 6–3	(Spain) Eduardo Alonso (Spain) Momo Gonzalez	
14/11/2024	(Spain) Pablo Cardona (Spain) Paquito Navarro	4–6 / 6–1 / 6–3	(Spain) Javier García Mora (Spain) Javier Gonzalez Barahona	
14/11/2024	(Spain) Alejandro Galán (Argentina) Federico Chingotto	6–3 / 7–6	(Spain) Jose García Diestro (Argentina) Sanyo Gutiérrez	

Women's

Date	Winners	Score	Opponent	Refs.
14/11/2024	(Spain) Ariana Sánchez (Spain) Paula Josemaria	6–1 / 7–6	(Argentina) Martina Fassio Goyeneche (Spain) Raquel Eugenio Barrera	
14/11/2024	(Argentina) Aranzazu Osoro (Spain) Veronica Virseda	6–2 / 6–0	(Argentina) Julieta Bidahorria (Spain) Marta Talavan	
14/11/2024	(Spain) Alejandra Salazar (Spain) Jessica Castelló	6–2 / 7–5	(Spain) Carla Mesa (Spain) Lucía Martínez Gomez	
14/11/2024	(Spain) Marta Ortega (Portugal) Sofia Araújo	6–2 / 6–2	(Spain) Marta Barrera (Spain) Marta Caparrós	
14/11/2024	(Spain) Bea González (Argentina) Delfina Brea	6–0 / 6–3	(Portugal) Ana Catarina Nogueira (Spain) Laia Rodriguez Abajo	
14/11/2024	(Argentina) Claudia Jensen (Spain) Tamara Icardo	6–1 / 6–1	(Spain) Alicia Blanco Rojo (Spain) Sara Ruiz Soto	
14/11/2024	(Spain) Beatriz Caldera (Spain) Lorena Rufo	6–2 / 6–4	(Spain) Lucia Sainz (Spain) Patricia Llaguno	
14/11/2024	(Spain) Claudia Fernandéz; Gemma Triay	6–3 / 6–2	(Spain) Esther Carnicero (Spain) Melania Merino Saez	

=== Quarter-Finals ===
Men's

Date	Winners	Score	Opponent	Refs.
15/11/2024	(Argentina) Agustín Tapia (Spain) Arturo Coello	7–5 / 5–7 / 6–1	(Spain) Javi Garrido (Brazil) Lucas Bergamini	
15/11/2024	(Spain) Francisco Guerrero (Spain) Jairo Bautista	6–4 / 6–4	(Spain) Coki Nieto (Spain) Jon Sanz	
15/11/2024	(Argentina) Franco Stupaczuk (Spain) Mike Yanguas	6–1 / 4–6 / 6–2	(United Arab Emirates) Iñigo Jofre (Argentina) Juan Tello	
15/11/2024	(Spain) Alejandro Galán (Argentina) Federico Chingotto	6–2 / 6–4	(Spain) Pablo Cardona (Spain) Paquito Navarro	

Women's

Date	Winners	Score	Opponent	Refs.
15/11/2024	(Spain) Ariana Sánchez (Spain) Paula Josemaria	6–4 / 6–2	(Argentina) Aranzazu Osoro (Spain) Veronica Virseda	
15/11/2024	(Spain) Marta Ortega (Portugal) Sofia Araújo	6–4 / 6–3	(Spain) Alejandra Salazar (Spain) Jessica Castelló	
15/11/2024	(Spain) Bea González (Argentina) Delfina Brea	6–2 / 6–7 / 6–3	(Argentina) Claudia Jensen (Spain) Tamara Icardo	
15/11/2024	(Spain) Claudia Fernandéz; Gemma Triay	7–5 / 6–0	(Spain) Beatriz Caldera (Spain) Lorena Rufo	

=== Semi-Finals ===
Men's

Date	Winners	Score	Opponent	Refs.
16/11/2024	(Argentina) Agustín Tapia (Spain) Arturo Coello	6–2 / 6–2	(Spain) Francisco Guerrero (Spain) Jairo Bautista	
16/11/2024	(Argentina) Franco Stupaczuk (Spain) Mike Yanguas	6–3 / 6–1	(Spain) Alejandro Galán (Argentina) Federico Chingotto	

Women's

Date	Winners	Score	Opponent	Refs.
16/11/2024	(Spain) Ariana Sánchez (Spain) Paula Josemaria	7–6 / 6–1	(Spain) Marta Ortega (Portugal) Sofia Araújo	
16/11/2024	(Spain) Claudia Fernandéz; Gemma Triay	6–0 / 6–2	(Spain) Bea González (Argentina) Delfina Brea	

=== Finals ===
Men's

Date	Winners	Score	Opponent	Refs.
17/11/2024	(Argentina) Agustín Tapia (Spain) Arturo Coello	6–4 / 6–2	(Argentina) Franco Stupaczuk (Spain) Mike Yanguas	

Women's

Date	Winners	Score	Opponent	Refs.
17/11/2024	(Spain) Ariana Sánchez (Spain) Paula Josemaria	7–5 / 7–6	(Spain) Claudia Fernandéz; Gemma Triay	
