= 2024 Seville P2 =

Padel championships

- Date: 28 April – 5 May
- Edition: 1st
- Category: P2
- Prize money: €235.000
- Location: Seville, Spain
- Venue: Estadio de La Cartuja

Champions
- Men's doubles: (Spain) Alejandro Galán (Argentina) Federico Chingotto
- Women's doubles: (Spain) Bea González (Argentina) Delfina Brea

Chronology

The 2024 Seville P2 (officially 2024 Seville Premier Padel P2) was the sixth tournament of the third season organized by Premier Padel, promoted by the International Padel Federation, and with the financial backing of Nasser Al-Khelaïfi's Qatar Sports Investments, now serving as the premier padel circuit.

In the women's division, the top two seeded pairs faced each other in the final for the second time in 2024, in a rematch of the Riyadh P1, with Bea Gonzalez and Delfina Brea to claim their third consecutive title after defeating the world number ones Ariana Sánchez and Paula Josemaría.

In the men's division, for the first time this season Agustín Tapia and Arturo Coello did not reach the finals, losing in the semifinals to Alejandro Galán and Federico Chingotto who would advance to the finals to face and defeat the No. 4 FIP ranked team Franco Stupaczuk and Martín Di Nenno, claiming their second consecutvie title as a pair.

== Relevant Data ==
With victories at the Brussels and Seville P2's, plus the final in Puerto Cabello, Galán and Chingotto became the second-ranked pair.

== Seeds ==
Male

Rnk.	Team	FIP Ranking Points
1	(Argentina) Agustín Tapia (Spain) Arturo Coello	23755
2	(Spain) Juan Lebrón (Spain) Paquito Navarro	18234
3	(Spain) Alejandro Galán (Argentina) Federico Chingotto	17564
4	(Argentina) Franco Stupaczuk (Argentina) Martin Di Nenno	17538
5	(Argentina) Fernando Belasteguín (Argentina) Juan Tello	9315
6	(Spain) Javi Garrido (Argentina) Miguel Yanguas	7229
7	(Argentina) Aléx Ruiz (Spain) Momo Gonzalez	6826
8	(Argentina) Maxi Sanchéz (Argentina) Sanyo Gutiérrez	6563
9	(Spain) Coki Jorge (Spain) Jon Sanz	5866
10	(Brazil) Lucas Bergamini (Spain) Victor Ruiz	5159
11	(Spain) Alejandro Arroyo (Spain) Eduardo Alonso	3599
12	(Spain) Francisco Gil Morales (Argentina) Ramiro Moyano	3312
13	(Argentina) Alex Chozas (Argentina) Lucho Capra	3112
14	(Spain) Javier Leal (Brazil) Lucas Campagnolo	2792
15	(Spain) Javier Rico (Spain) Juanlu Esbri	2759
16	(Spain) Javi Ruiz (Spain) Pablo Cardona	2645

Female

Rnk.	Team	FIP Ranking Points
1	(Spain) Ariana Sanchez (Spain) Paula Josemaria	24744
2	(Spain) Beatriz Gonzalez (Argentina) Delfina Brea	17108
3	(Spain) Claudia Fernandez (Spain) Gemma Triay	11629
4	(Spain) Alejandra Salazar (Spain) Tamara Icardo	10354
5	(Spain) Marta Ortega (Spain) Veronica Virseda	10294
6	(Argentina) Claudia Jensen (Spain) Jessica Castello	9127
7	(Portugal) Sofia Araújo (Argentina) Virginia Riera	8597
8	(Argentina) Lucia Sainz (Spain) Patty Llaguno	5555
9	(Spain) Barbara Las Heras (Spain) Victoria Iglesias	5538
10	(Argentina) Aranzazu Osoro (Spain) Carmen Goenaga	5054
11	(Spain) Alejandra Alonso (Spain) Andrea Ustero	2740
12	(Spain) Beatriz Caldera (Spain) Lorena Rufo	2709
13	(Portugal) Ana Catarina Nogueira (Spain) Marta Talavan	2691
14	(France) Alix Collombon (Argentina) Julieta Bidahorria	2606
15	(Russia) Ksenia Sharifova (Spain) Lucia Martinez	2399
16	(Spain) Esther Carnicero (Spain) Marina Lobo	2221

== Head-to-head record between teams ranked in the top 4 during the season ==
=== Man's ===
Event	Coello–Tapia	Galán–Chingotto	Lebrón–Paquito	Di Nenno–Stupaczuk	Former Pairs	Galán–Lebrón	Paquito–Sanyo
Coello–Tapia	—	1–2	—	—		1–1	2–0
Galán–Chingotto	2–1	—	—	2–0		—	—
Lebrón–Paquito	—	—	—	0–1		—	—
Di Nenno–Stupaczuk	—	0–2	1–0	—		0–2	—
Former Pairs							
Galán–Lebrón	1–1	—	—	2–0		—	—
Paquito–Sanyo	0–2	—	—	—		—	—

=== Women's ===
Event	Ariana–Paula	Gonzalez–D. Brea	Fernandez–Triay	Icardo–Salazar	Former Pairs	Ortega–Triay	Ortega–Virseda
Ariana–Paula	—	1–1	2–1	1–0		—	1–0
B. Gonzalez–D. Brea	1–1	—	1–0	3–0		—	—
Fernandez–Triay	1–2	0–1	—	0–1		—	—
Icardo–Salazar	0–1	0–3	1–0	—		—	—
Former Pairs							
Ortega–Triay	—	—	—	—		—	—
Ortega–Virseda	0–1	—	—	—		—	—

== Draws ==
=== Men's Bracket ===
Round of 32
1	(Spain) Coello / (Argentina) Tapia	6	6
20	(Spain) J.G. Diestro / (Spain) P. Lijó	1	3
Q	(Spain) A.R. Martinez / (Spain) J. Martinez	4	2
21	(Spain) I. Sager / (Spain) S. Oria	6	6
13	(Argentina) A. Chozas / (Argentina) L. Capra	7	7
WC	(Spain) Á. Amaya / (Spain) P. Amaya	6	6
24	(Spain) J. Garcia / (Spain) J. Munoz	4	6
6	(Spain) J. Garrido / (Spain) Yanguas	6	7
8	(Argentina) Maxi / (Argentina) Sanyo	6	6
12	(Spain) F. Gil / (Argentina) R. Moyano	1	4
10	(Brazil) L. Bergamini / (Spain) V. Ruiz	6	2
WC	(Spain) I. Vilariño / (Spain) M. Semmler	7	6
26	(Spain) I. Ramirez / (Spain) P.G. Rodrigo	4	6	4
23	(Spain) J.G. Barahona / (Spain) P. Fernandez	6	4	6
16	(Spain) J. Ruiz / (Spain) P. Cardona	3	2
3	(Spain) Galán / (Argentina) F. Chingotto	6	6
4	(Argentina) F. Stupaczuk / (Argentina) Di Nenno	6	6
Q	(Italy) D. Perino / (Spain) M. Quilez	2	3
11	(Spain) A. Arroyo / (Spain) E. Alonso	6	7
25	(Spain) A. Ayats / (Spain) F. Guerrero	3	6
22	(Spain) E. Goenaga / (Spain) T. Zapata	6	7
Q	(Spain) D. Sastre / (Spain) E. Chamero	2	6
19	(Argentina) J.C. Belluati / (Argentina) M. Lamperti	2	3
5	(Argentina) Belasteguin / (Argentina) J. Tello	6	6
7	(Spain) A. Ruiz / (Spain) Momo	7	7
18	(Argentina) A. Gutiérrez / (Spain) J. Rico	6	6
14	(Spain) J. Leal / (Brazil) L. Campagnolo	6	7
17	(Spain) G. Rubio / (Spain) J. Bautista	1	6
Q	(Argentina) L. Augsburger / (Argentina) V. Libaak	6	6
9	(Spain) Coki / (Spain) J. Sanz	4	2
15	(Spain) J. Rico / (Spain) J. Esbri	5	3
2	(Spain) Lebrón / (Spain) Paquito	7	6

Round of 16
1	(Spain) Coello / (Argentina) Tapia	7	6
21	(Spain) I. Sager / (Spain) S. Oria	5	3
13	(Argentina) A. Chozas / (Argentina) L. Capra	2	4
6	(Spain) J. Garrido / (Spain) Yanguas	6	6
8	(Argentina) Maxi / (Argentina) Sanyo	6	6	6
WC	(Spain) I. Vilariño / (Spain) M. Semmler	2	7	3
23	(Spain) J.G. Barahona / (Spain) P. Fernandez	1	2
3	(Spain) Galán / (Argentina) F. Chingotto	6	6
4	(Argentina) F. Stupaczuk / (Argentina) Di Nenno	6	4	6
11	(Spain) A. Arroyo / (Spain) E. Alonso	4	6	4
22	(Spain) E. Goenaga / (Spain) T. Zapata	7	5	6
5	(Argentina) Belasteguin / (Argentina) J. Tello	6	7	3
7	(Spain) A. Ruiz / (Spain) Momo	6	6
14	(Spain) J. Leal / (Brazil) L. Campagnolo	3	2
Q	(Argentina) L. Augsburger / (Argentina) V. Libaak	3	6
2	(Spain) Lebrón / (Spain) Paquito	6	7

Quarter-Final
1	(Spain) Coello / (Argentina) Tapia	6	6
6	(Spain) J. Garrido / (Spain) Yanguas	1	2
8	(Argentina) Maxi / (Argentina) Sanyo	2	2
3	(Spain) Galán / (Argentina) F. Chingotto	6	6
4	(Argentina) F. Stupaczuk / (Argentina) Di Nenno	6	6
22	(Spain) E. Goenaga / (Spain) T. Zapata	3	2
7	(Spain) A. Ruiz / (Spain) Momo	6	2
2	(Spain) Lebrón / (Spain) Paquito	7	6

Semi-Finals
1	(Spain) Coello / (Argentina) Tapia	3	5
3	(Spain) Galán / (Argentina) F. Chingotto	6	7
4	(Argentina) F. Stupaczuk / (Argentina) Di Nenno	7	3	6
2	(Spain) Lebrón / (Spain) Paquito	5	6	3

Finals
3	(Spain) Galán / (Argentina) F. Chingotto	7	6
4	(Argentina) F. Stupaczuk / (Argentina) Di Nenno	6	4

=== Women's Bracket ===
Round of 32
1	(Spain) A. Sanchez / (Spain) P. Josemaria
Bye
20	(Spain) J. Velasco / (Spain) N. Canovas	5	3
23	(Spain) M. Barrera / (Spain) M. Caparros	7	6
Q	(Spain) A. Rojo / (Spain) M. Rivas	2	1
12	(Spain) B. Caldera / (Spain) L. Rufo	6	6
13	(Portugal) A. Nogueira / (Spain) M. Talavan	6	0
5	(Spain) M. Ortega / (Spain) V. Virseda	7	6
8	(Spain) L. Sainz / (Spain) P. Llaguno	6	7
15	(Russia) K. Sharifova / (Spain) L. Martinez	2	6
21	(Spain) M. Merino / (Spain) S. Saiz	3	3
18	(Spain) A. Martinez / (Spain) M. Guinart	6	6
10	(Argentina) A. Osoro / (Spain) C. Goenaga	6	6
Q	(Spain) A. Cañellas / (Spain) T. Navarro	1	2
Bye
3	(Spain) C. Fernandez / (Spain) G. Triay
4	(Spain) A. Salazar / (Spain) T. Icardo
Bye
16	(Spain) E. Carnicero / (Spain) M. Lobo	5	6
17	(Spain) M.R. Abajo / (Spain) N. Rodriguez	7	7
Q	(Spain) A. Soriano / (Spain) M. Goyenche	6	6
19	(Spain) Carla Mesa / (Spain) Sara Ruiz	4	4
22	(Spain) C. Castillon / (Italy) C. Orsi	4	2
6	(Argentina) C. Jensen / (Spain) J. Castello	6	6
7	(Portugal) S. Araújo / (Argentina) V. Riera	6	6
WC	(Spain) E. De La Rosa / (Spain) M. Portillo	0	3
14	(France) A. Collombon / (Argentina) J. Bidahorria	6	6
Q	(Italy) C. Casali / (Spain) L. Arruabarrena	4	3
9	(Spain) B. Las Heras / (Spain) V. Iglesias	0
11	(Spain) A. Alonso / (Spain) A. Ustero	5	*
Bye
2	(Spain) B. González / (Argentina) D. Brea

Round of 16
1	(Spain) A. Sanchez / (Spain) P. Josemaria	6	6
23	(Spain) M. Barrera / (Spain) M. Caparro	3	1
12	(Spain) B. Caldera / (Spain) L. Rufo	6	2	6
5	(Spain) M. Ortega / (Spain) V. Virseda	4	6	7
8	(Spain) L. Sainz / (Spain) P. Llaguno	7	6
18	(Spain) A. Martinez / (Spain) M. Guinart	6	1
10	(Argentina) A. Osoro / (Spain) C. Goenaga	6	5	4
3	(Spain) C. Fernandez / (Spain) G. Triay	3	7	6
4	(Spain) A. Salazar / (Spain) T. Icardo	6	6
17	(Spain) M.R. Abajo / (Spain) N. Rodriguez	0	2
Q	(Spain) A. Soriano / (Spain) M. Goyenche	1	3
6	(Argentina) C. Jensen / (Spain) J. Castello	6	6
7	(Portugal) S. Araújo / (Argentina) V. Riera	3	7	6
14	(France) A. Collombon / (Argentina) J. Bidahorria	6	6	1
11	(Spain) A. Alonso / (Spain) A. Ustero	3	5
2	(Spain) B. González / (Argentina) D. Brea	6	7

Quarter-Final
1	(Spain) A. Sanchez / (Spain) P. Josemaria	6	6
5	(Spain) M. Ortega / (Spain) V. Virseda	2	0
8	(Spain) L. Sainz / (Spain) P. Llaguno	1	1
3	(Spain) C. Fernandez / (Spain) G. Triay	6	6
4	(Spain) A. Salazar / (Spain) T. Icardo	6	2	6
6	(Argentina) C. Jensen / (Spain) J. Castello	4	6	4
7	(Portugal) S. Araújo / (Argentina) V. Riera	4	2
2	(Spain) B. González / (Argentina) D. Brea	6	6

Semi-Finals
1	(Spain) A. Sanchez / (Spain) P. Josemaria	6	4	6
3	(Spain) C. Fernandez / (Spain) G. Triay	3	6	3
4	(Spain) A. Salazar / (Spain) T. Icardo	4	6	5
2	(Spain) B. González / (Argentina) D. Brea	6	4	7

Finals
1	(Spain) A. Sanchez / (Spain) P. Josemaria	1	1
2	(Spain) B. González / (Argentina) D. Brea	6	6

== Results ==
=== Round of 32 ===
Men's

Date	Winners	Score	Opponent	Refs.
1/5/2024	(Argentina) Agustín Tapia (Spain) Arturo Coello	6–1 / 6–3	(Spain) Jose García Diestro (Spain) Pablo Lijó	
1/5/2024	(Spain) Ignacio Sager (Spain) Salvador Oria	6–4 / 6–2	(Spain) Alonso Rodriguez Martinez (Spain) Javier Martinez Vazquez	
30/4/2024	(Argentina) Alex Chozas (Argentina) Lucho Capra	7–6 / 7–6	(Spain) Alvaro Melendez Amaya (Spain) Pedro Melendez Amaya	
1/5/2024	(Spain) Javier Garridoz (Spain) Mike Yanguas	6–4 / 7–6	(Spain) Javier García Mora (Spain) Jaime Muñoz	
30/4/2024	(Argentina) Maxi Sánchez (Argentina) Sanyo Gutiérrez	6–1 / 6–4	(Spain) Francisco Gil Morales (Argentina) Ramiro Moyano	
30/4/2024	(Spain) Ignacio Vilariño (Spain) Miguel Semmler	7–6 / 6–2	(Brazil) Lucas Bergamini (Spain) Víctor Ruiz	
30/4/2024	(Spain) Javier Gonzalez Barahona (Spain) Pincho Fernandez	6–4 / 4–6 / 6–4	(Spain) Ivan Ramirez (Spain) Pablo García Rodrigo	
1/5/2024	(Spain) Alejandro Galán (Argentina) Federico Chingotto	6–3 / 6–2	(Spain) Javi Ruiz (Spain) Pablo Cardona	
1/5/2024	(Argentina) Franco Stupaczuk (Argentina) Martin Di Nenno	6–2 / 6–3	(Italy) Denis Perino (Spain) Marc Quilez	
1/5/2024	(Spain) Alejandro Arroyo (Spain) Eduardo Alonso	6–3 / 7–6	(Spain) Arnau Ayats (Spain) Francisco Guerrero	
1/5/2024	(Spain) Enrique Goenaga (Spain) Teodoro Zapata	6–2 / 7–6	(Spain) Daniel Santigosa (Spain) Emilio Sanchez Chamero	
1/5/2024	(Argentina) Fernando Belasteguín (Argentina) Juan Tello	6–2 / 6–3	(Spain) Juan Cruz Belluati (Argentina) Miguel Lamperti	
30/4/2024	(Spain) Alex Ruiz (Spain) Momo Gonzalez	7–6 / 7–6	(Argentina) Agustin Gutiérrez (Spain) José Rico	
1/5/2024	(Spain) Javi Leal (Brazil) Lucas Campagnolo	6–1 / 7–6	(Spain) Gonzalo Rubio (Spain) Jairo Bautista	
1/5/2024	(Argentina) Leandro Augsburger (Argentina) Valentino Libaak	6–4 / 6–2	(Spain) Coki Nieto (Spain) Jon Sanz	
30/4/2024	(Spain) Juan Lebrón (Spain) Paquito Navarro	7–5 / 6–3	(Spain) Javi Rico (Spain) Juanlu Esbri	

Women's

Date	Winners	Score	Opponent	Refs.
30/4/2024	(Spain) Marta Barrera (Spain) Marta Caparrós	7–5 / 6–3	(Spain) Noa Canovas (Spain) Jimena Velasco	
1/5/2024	(Spain) Beatriz Caldera (Spain) Lorena Rufo	6–2 / 6–1	(Spain) Alicia Blanco Rojo (Spain) Monica Gomez Rivas	
1/5/2024	(Spain) Marta Ortega (Spain) Verónica Virseda	7–6 / 6–0	(Portugal) Ana Catarina Nogueira (Spain) Marta Talavan	
30/4/2024	(Spain) Lucia Sainz (Spain) Patty Llaguno	6–2 / 7–6	(Russia) Ksenia Sharifova (Spain) Lucía Martínez	
30/4/2024	(Spain) Araceli Martinez (Spain) Marina Guinart	6–3 / 6–3	(Spain) Melania Merino (Spain) Sofía Saiz	
30/4/2024	(Argentina) Aranzazu Osoro (Spain) Carmen Goenaga	6–1 / 6–2	(Spain) Ariadna Cañellas (Spain) Teresa Navarro	
30/4/2024	(Spain) Laia Rodriguez Abajo (Spain) Nuria Rodriguez	7–5 / 7–6	(Spain) Esther Carnicero (Spain) Marina Martinez Lobo	
1/5/2024	(Spain) Arantxa Soriano (Spain) Martina Fassio	6–4 / 6–4	(Spain) Carla Mesa (Spain) Sara Ruiz	
1/5/2024	(Argentina) Claudia Jensen (Spain) Jessica Castelló	6–4 / 6–2	(Italy) Carolina Orsi (Spain) Carmen Castillon	
1/5/2024	(Portugal) Sofia Araújo (Argentina) Virginia Riera	6–0 / 6–3	(Spain) Elena De la Rosa (Spain) María Portillo	
30/4/2024	(France) Alix Collombon (Argentina) Julieta Bidahorria	6–4 / 6–3	(Spain) Carlotta Casali (Spain) Lara Arruabarrena	
1/5/2024	(Spain) Alejandra Alonso (Spain) Andrea Ustero Prieto	5–0 / W.O.	(Spain) Barbara Las Heras (Spain) Victoria Iglesias	

=== Round of 16 ===
Men's

Date	Winners	Score	Opponent	Refs.
2/5/2024	(Argentina) Agustín Tapia (Spain) Arturo Coello	7–5 / 6–3	(Spain) Ignacio Sager (Spain) Salvador Oria	
2/5/2024	(Spain) Javier Garridoz (Spain) Mike Yanguas	6–2 / 6–4	(Argentina) Alex Chozas (Argentina) Lucho Capra	
2/5/2024	(Argentina) Maxi Sánchez (Argentina) Sanyo Gutiérrez	6–2 / 6–7 / 6–3	(Spain) Ignacio Vilariño (Spain) Miguel Semmler	
2/5/2024	(Spain) Alejandro Galán (Argentina) Federico Chingotto	6–1 / 6–2	(Spain) Javier Gonzalez Barahona (Spain) Pincho Fernandez	
2/5/2024	(Argentina) Franco Stupaczuk (Argentina) Martin Di Nenno	6–4 / 4–6 / 6–4	(Spain) Alejandro Arroyo (Spain) Eduardo Alonso	
2/5/2024	(Spain) Enrique Goenaga (Spain) Teodoro Zapata	7–6 / 5–7 / 6–3	(Argentina) Fernando Belasteguín (Argentina) Juan Tello	
2/5/2024	(Spain) Alex Ruiz (Spain) Momo Gonzalez	6–3 / 6–2	(Spain) Javi Leal (Brazil) Lucas Campagnolo	
2/5/2024	(Spain) Juan Lebrón (Spain) Paquito Navarro	6–3 / 7–6	(Argentina) Leandro Augsburger (Argentina) Valentino Libaak	

Women's

Date	Winners	Score	Opponent	Refs.
2/5/2024	(Spain) Ariana Sánchez (Spain) Paula Josemaria	6–3 / 6–1	(Spain) Marta Barrera (Spain) Marta Caparrós	
2/5/2024	(Spain) Marta Ortega (Spain) Verónica Virseda	4–6 / 6–2 / 7–6	(Spain) Beatriz Caldera (Spain) Lorena Rufo	
2/5/2024	(Spain) Lucia Sainz (Spain) Patty Llaguno	7–6 / 6–1	(Spain) Araceli Martinez (Spain) Marina Guinart	
2/5/2024	(Spain) Claudia Fernandez (Spain) Gemma Triay	3–6 / 7–5 / 6–4	(Argentina) Aranzazu Osoro (Spain) Carmen Goenaga	
2/5/2024	(Spain) Alejandra Salazar (Spain) Tamara Icardo	6–0 / 6–2	(Spain) Laia Rodriguez Abajo (Spain) Nuria Rodriguez	
2/5/2024	(Argentina) Claudia Jensen (Spain) Jessica Castelló	6–1 / 6–3	(Spain) Arantxa Soriano (Spain) Martina Fassio	
2/5/2024	(Portugal) Sofia Araújo (Argentina) Virginia Riera	3–6 / 7–6 / 6–1	(France) Alix Collombon (Argentina) Julieta Bidahorria	
2/5/2024	(Spain) Bea González (Argentina) Delfina Brea	6–3 / 7–5	(Spain) Alejandra Alonso (Spain) Andrea Ustero Prieto	

=== Quarter-Finals ===
Men's

Date	Winners	Score	Opponent	Refs.
3/5/2024	(Argentina) Agustín Tapia (Spain) Arturo Coello	6–1 / 6–2	(Spain) Javier Garridoz (Spain) Mike Yanguas	
3/5/2024	(Spain) Alejandro Galán (Argentina) Federico Chingotto	6–2 / 6–2	(Argentina) Maxi Sánchez (Argentina) Sanyo Gutiérrez	
3/5/2024	(Argentina) Franco Stupaczuk (Argentina) Martin Di Nenno	6–3 / 6–2	(Spain) Enrique Goenaga (Spain) Teodoro Zapata	
3/5/2024	(Spain) Juan Lebrón (Spain) Paquito Navarro	7–6 / 6–2	(Spain) Alex Ruiz (Spain) Momo Gonzalez	

Women's

Date	Winners	Score	Opponent	Refs.
3/5/2024	(Spain) Ariana Sánchez (Spain) Paula Josemaria	6–2 / 6–0	(Spain) Marta Ortega (Spain) Verónica Virseda	
3/5/2024	(Spain) Claudia Fernandez (Spain) Gemma Triay	6–1 / 6–1	(Spain) Lucia Sainz (Spain) Patty Llaguno	
3/5/2024	(Spain) Alejandra Salazar (Spain) Tamara Icardo	6–4 / 2–6 / 6–4	(Argentina) Claudia Jensen (Spain) Jessica Castelló	
3/5/2024	(Spain) Bea González (Argentina) Delfina Brea	6–4 / 6–2	(Portugal) Sofia Araújo (Argentina) Virginia Riera	

=== Semi-Finals ===
Men's

Date	Winners	Score	Opponent	Refs.
4/5/2024	(Spain) Alejandro Galán (Argentina) Federico Chingotto	6–3 / 7–5	(Argentina) Agustín Tapia (Spain) Arturo Coello	
4/5/2024	(Argentina) Franco Stupaczuk (Argentina) Martin Di Nenno	7–5 / 3–6 / 6–3	(Spain) Juan Lebrón (Spain) Paquito Navarro	

Women's

Date	Winners	Score	Opponent	Refs.
4/5/2024	(Spain) Ariana Sánchez (Spain) Paula Josemaria	6–3 / 4–6 / 6–3	(Spain) Claudia Fernandez (Spain) Gemma Triay	
4/5/2024	(Spain) Bea González (Argentina) Delfina Brea	6–4 / 4–6 / 7–5	(Spain) Alejandra Salazar (Spain) Tamara Icardo	

=== Finals ===
Men's

Date	Winners	Score	Opponent	Refs.
5/5/2024	(Spain) Alejandro Galán (Argentina) Federico Chingotto	7–6 / 6–4	(Argentina) Franco Stupaczuk (Argentina) Martin Di Nenno	

Women's

Date	Winners	Score	Opponent	Refs.
5/5/2024	(Spain) Bea González (Argentina) Delfina Brea	6–1 / 6–1	(Spain) Ariana Sánchez (Spain) Paula Josemaria	
