= 2024 Puerto Cabello P2 =

Padel championships

- Date: 23 March – 31 March
- Edition: 1st
- Category: P2
- Prize money: €235.000
- Location: Puerto Cabello, Venezuela
- Venue: Malecón Plaza Bolívar

Champions
- Men's doubles: (Argentina) Agustín Tapia (Spain) Arturo Coello
- Women's doubles: (Spain) Bea Gonzalez (Argentina) Delfina Brea

Chronology

The 2024 Brussels P2 (officially 2024 Puerto Cabello Premier Padel P2) was the fourth tournament of the third season organized by Premier Padel, promoted by the International Padel Federation, and with the financial backing of Nasser Al-Khelaïfi's Qatar Sports Investments, now serving as the premier padel circuit.

In the women's division, due to the abscense Ariana Sanchez and Paula Josemaria, Bea Gonzalez and Delfina Brea started the tournament was the number one seeded pair. They would go on to the defeat the fourth seeded team, Alejandra Salazar and Tamara Icardo in the finals, winning their first title of the season. With Bea and Delfi win, they became the third different team to win a tournament in the season.

In the men's division, the No. 1 FIP ranked team, Agustín Tapia and Arturo Coello, won their third title of the season after defeating the newly formed third ranked pair, Alejandro Galán and Federico Chingotto, who reached the finals in their first tournament as a team.

== Relevant Data ==
Before the tournament, after Alejandro Galán and Juan Lebrón played their last tournament together in Acapulco, Galán announced that Federico Chingotto would become his new partner. Together they started as the third ranked team in FIP ranking. While Lebrón would temporarily play with Chingotto's former partner Momo González, starting as the fourth seeded team.

== Seeds ==
Male

Rnk.	Team	FIP Ranking Points
1	(Argentina) Agustín Tapia (Spain) Arturo Coello	22976
2	(Argentina) Franco Stupaczuk (Argentina) Martin Di Nenno	18500
3	(Spain) Alejandro Galán (Argentina) Federico Chingotto	18262
4	(Argentina) Juan Lebrón (Spain) Momo Gonzalez	14623
5	(Spain) Paquito Navarro (Argentina) Sanyo Gutiérrez	12310
6	(Spain) Javi Garrido (Argentina) Miguel Yanguas	7353
7	(Spain) Coki Jorge (Spain) Jon Sanz	5752
8	(Brazil) Lucas Bergamini (Spain) Victor Ruiz	5612
9	(Spain) Gonzalo Rubio (Argentina) Maxi Sánchez	4313
10	(Spain) Alejandro Arroyo (Spain) Eduardo Alonso	3512
11	(Spain) Javi Ruiz (Spain) Pablo Cardona	2658
12	(Argentina) Alex Chozas (Brazil) Lucas Campagnolo	2304
13	(Spain) Jaime Munoz (Spain) Jairo Bautista	2095
14	(Spain) Enrique Goenaga (Spain) Teodoro Zapata	2091
15	(Spain) Alvaro Cepero (Spain) Jose David Sanchez Serrano	1851
16	(Argentina) Miguel Semmler (Spain) Pablo Lijó	1746

Female

Rnk.	Team	FIP Ranking Points
1	(Spain) Beatriz Gonzalez (Argentina) Delfina Brea	17312
2	(Spain) Gemma Triay (Spain) Claudia Fernandez	12086
3	(Spain) Marta Ortega (Spain) Veronica Virseda	11096
4	(Spain) Alejandra Salazar (Spain) Tamara Icardo	10632
5	(Portugal) Sofia Araújo (Argentina) Virginia Riera	7964
6	(Argentina) Claudia Jensen (Spain) Jessica Castello	7836
7	(Argentina) Lucia Sainz (Spain) Patty Llaguno	5602
8	(Argentina) Aranzazu Osoro (Spain) Carmen Goenaga	5204
9	(Spain) Marta Talavan (Spain) Nuria Rodriguez	2856
10	(France) Alix Collombon (Argentina) Julieta Bidahorria	2773
11	(Italy) Carolina Orsi (Spain) Marina Lobo	2542
12	(Portugal) Ana Catarina Nogueira (Spain) Beatriz Caldera	2470
13	(Spain) Lorena Rufo (Spain) Sara Ruiz	2267
14	(Spain) Marta Barrera (Spain) Marta Caparros	1926
15	(Spain) Melania Merino (Spain) Sofia Saiz	1878
16	(Spain) Jimena Velasco (Spain) Noa Canovas	1793

== Head-to-head record between teams ranked in the top 4 during the season ==
=== Man's ===
Event	Coello–Tapia	Di Nenno–Stupaczuk	Galán–Chingotto	Paquito–Sanyo	Former Pairs	Galán–Lebrón
Coello–Tapia	—	—	1–0	2–0		1–1
Di Nenno–Stupaczuk	—	—	0–1	—		0–2
Galán–Chingotto	0–1	1–0	—	—		—
Paquito–Sanyo	0–2	—	—	—		—
Former Pairs						
Galán–Lebrón	1–1	2–0	—	—		—

=== Women's ===
Event	Ariana–Paula	Gonzalez–D. Brea	Fernandez–Triay	Ortega–Virseda	Former Pairs	Ortega–Triay	Icardo–Salazar
Ariana–Paula	—	1–0	1–0	1–0		—	1–0
B. Gonzalez–D. Brea	0–1	—	—	—		—	1–0
Fernandez–Triay	0–1	—	—	—		—	0–1
Ortega–Virseda	0–1	—	—	—		—	—
Former Pairs							
Ortega–Triay	—	—	—	—		—	—
Icardo–Salazar	0–1	0–1	1–0	—		—	—

== Draws ==
=== Men's Bracket ===
Round of 32
1	(Spain) Coello / (Argentina) Tapia	6	6
(Spain) D. Gil / (Argentina) C.G. Gutiérrez	3	2
(Spain) A. Cepero / (Spain) J.D. Sanchez	3	7	4
Q	(Spain) A. Sans / (Spain) D.G. Sanchez	6	5	6
(Spain) G. Rubio / (Argentina) Maxi	0	6	5
(Spain) Á. Amaya / (Spain) P. Amaya	6	4	0
(Italy) A. Patiniotis / (Italy) F. Dominguez	2	2
8	(Brazil) L. Bergamini / (Spain) V. Ruiz	6	5
7	(Spain) Coki / (Spain) J. Sanz	4	6	7
(Spain) Javi Ruiz / (Spain) P. Cardona	6	2	5
(Argentina) A. Chozas / (Brazil) L. Campagnolo	7	6
(Spain) J.J. Casas / (Argentina) M. Lamperti	6	1
WC	(Venezuela) E. Figuera / (Venezuela) R. Rodriguez	1	2
(Spain) A. Ayats / (Spain) F. Guerrero	6	6
Q	(Spain) M. Quilez / (Spain) T. Bueno	5	4
4	(Spain) J. Lebrón / (Spain) M. Gonzalez	7	6
3	(Spain) Galán / (Argentina) F. Chingotto	6	6
(Chile) J. Valdes / (Spain) R. Mendez
(Spain) E. Goenaga / (Spain) T. Zapata	6	6	6
Q	(Spain) F. Ramirez / (France) T. Leygue	2	7	4
(Argentina) A. Silingo / (Portugal) G. Nunes	6	6
(Venezuela) A. Devletian / (Venezuela) D. Almedo	3	3
(Spain) J.G. Barahona / (Spain) J.G. Mora	5	3
5	(Spain) Paquito / (Argentina) Sanyo	7	6
6	(Spain) J. Garrido / (Spain) Yanguas	7	6
(Spain) M. Semmler / (Spain) P. Lijó	6	3
(Spain) A. Arroyo / (Spain) E. Alonso	4	7	4
Q	(Argentina) L. Augsburger / (Argentina) V. Libaak	6	5	6
(Spain) I. Ramirez / (Spain) P.G. Rodrigo	1	4
(Spain) J. Munoz / (Spain) J. Bautista	6	6
(Spain) R.M. Duran / (Spain) S. Alba	1	2
2	(Argentina) F. Stupaczuk / (Argentina) Di Nenno	6	6

Round of 16
1	(Spain) Coello / (Argentina) Tapia	6	6
Q	(Spain) A. Sans / (Spain) D.G. Sanchez	3	4
(Spain) G. Rubio / (Argentina) Maxi	3	7	6
8	(Brazil) L. Bergamini / (Spain) V. Ruiz	6	5	3
7	(Spain) Coki / (Spain) J. Sanz	3	*
(Argentina) A. Chozas / (Brazil) L. Campagnolo	2
(Spain) A. Ayats / (Spain) F. Guerrero	6	4	*
4	(Spain) J. Lebrón / (Spain) M. Gonzalez	4	1
3	(Spain) Galán / (Argentina) F. Chingotto	6	7	6
(Spain) E. Goenaga / (Spain) T. Zapata	7	5	2
(Argentina) A. Silingo / (Portugal) G. Nunes	2	4
5	(Spain) Paquito / (Argentina) Sanyo	6	6
6	(Spain) J. Garrido / (Spain) Yanguas
Q	(Argentina) L. Augsburger / (Argentina) V. Libaak	*
(Spain) J. Munoz / (Spain) J. Bautista	4	4
2	(Argentina) F. Stupaczuk / (Argentina) Di Nenno	6	6

Quarter-Final
1	(Spain) Coello / (Argentina) Tapia	7	6
(Spain) G. Rubio / (Argentina) Maxi	5	3
7	(Spain) Coki / (Spain) J. Sanz	6	7	6
(Spain) A. Ayats / (Spain) F. Guerrero	7	5	1
3	(Spain) Galán / (Argentina) F. Chingotto	6	7
5	(Spain) Paquito / (Argentina) Sanyo	2	5
Q	(Argentina) L. Augsburger / (Argentina) V. Libaak	5	0
2	(Argentina) F. Stupaczuk / (Argentina) Di Nenno	7	6

Semi-Finals
1	(Spain) Coello / (Argentina) Tapia	6	6	6
7	(Spain) Coki / (Spain) J. Sanz	7	2	0
3	(Spain) Galán / (Argentina) F. Chingotto	6	6
2	(Argentina) F. Stupaczuk / (Argentina) Di Nenno	4	3

Finals
1	(Spain) Coello / (Argentina) Tapia	2	6	6
2	(Spain) Galán / (Argentina) F. Chingotto	6	3	3

=== Women's Bracket ===
Round of 32
1	(Spain) B. González / (Argentina) D. Brea
Bye
(Portugal) C. Domingos / (Netherlands) R. Van Der Hoek	3	2
(Argentina) D. Valenzuela / (Brazil) R. Piltcher	6	6
(Spain) L. Rufo / (Spain) S. Ruiz	6	6
(Spain) M. Merino / (Spain) S. Saiz
(Spain) M. Talavan / (Spain) N. Rodriguez	2	3
6	(Argentina) C. Jensen / (Spain) J. Castello	6	6
5	(Portugal) S. Araújo / (Argentina) V. Riera	6	6
(Spain) A. Salvado / (Spain) A. Gracia	2	0
(Spain) M.R. Abajo / (Spain) S. Bellver	1	6	6
(Spain) M. Barrera / (Spain) M. Caparros	6	3	2
Q	(Portugal) M. Fernandes / (Spain) V. Basilio	1	5	*
(Spain) A. Garcia Roman / (United States) B. Dubins	6	4
Bye
3	(Spain) M. Ortega / (Spain) V. Virseda
4	(Spain) A. Salazar / (Spain) T. Icardo
Bye
(Spain) A. Gasco / (Spain) C. Millan	6	3	6
(Spain) L. Exposito / (Spain) N. Vivancos	2	6	2
(France) A. Collombon / (Argentina) J. Bidahorria	6	6
Q	(Mexico) A. Ruiz / (Mexico) C. Coellar	0	0
(Portugal) A. Nogueira / (Spain) B. Sanchez	5	2
7	(Spain) L. Sainz / (Spain) P. Llaguno	7	6
8	(Argentina) A. Osoro / (Spain) V. Virseda	4	4
(Spain) J. Velasco / (Spain) N. Canovas	6	6
Q	(Portugal) B. Melo / (France) E. Invernon	1	0
(France) C. Touly / (Portugal) M. Fernandes	6	6
(Spain) C. Orsi / (Spain) M. Lobo	6	6
WC	(Venezuela) M. Blanco / (Venezuela) M. Briquet	0	0
Bye
2	(Spain) C. Fernandez / (Spain) G. Triay

Round of 16
1	(Spain) B. González / (Argentina) D. Brea	*
(Argentina) D. Valenzuela / (Brazil) R. Piltcher
(Spain) L. Rufo / (Spain) S. Ruiz	*
6	(Argentina) C. Jensen / (Spain) J. Castello
5	(Portugal) S. Araújo / (Argentina) V. Riera	6	6
(Spain) M.R. Abajo / (Spain) S. Bellver	4	2
Q	(Portugal) M. Fernandes / (Spain) V. Basilio	0	0
3	(Spain) M. Ortega / (Spain) V. Virseda	6	6
4	(Spain) A. Salazar / (Spain) T. Icardo	6	6
(Spain) A. Gasco / (Spain) C. Millan	0	1
(France) A. Collombon / (Argentina) J. Bidahorria	1	1
7	(Spain) L. Sainz / (Spain) P. Llaguno	6	6
(Spain) J. Velasco / (Spain) N. Canovas	6	6
(France) C. Touly / (Portugal) M. Fernandes	2	1
(Spain) C. Orsi / (Spain) M. Lobo
2	(Spain) C. Fernandez / (Spain) G. Triay	*

Quarter-Final
1	(Spain) B. González / (Argentina) D. Brea	6	6
(Spain) L. Rufo / (Spain) S. Ruiz	4	3
5	(Portugal) S. Araújo / (Argentina) V. Riera	6	7
3	(Spain) M. Ortega / (Spain) V. Virseda	2	5
4	(Spain) A. Salazar / (Spain) T. Icardo	6	6
7	(Spain) L. Sainz / (Spain) P. Llaguno	2	2
(Spain) J. Velasco / (Spain) N. Canovas	3	0
2	(Spain) C. Fernandez / (Spain) G. Triay	6	3

Semi-Finals
1	(Spain) B. González / (Argentina) D. Brea	6	6
5	(Portugal) S. Araújo / (Argentina) V. Riera	4	3
4	(Spain) A. Salazar / (Spain) T. Icardo	4	*
2	(Spain) C. Fernandez / (Spain) G. Triay	3

Finals
1	(Spain) B. González / (Argentina) D. Brea	6	6
4	(Spain) A. Salazar / (Spain) T. Icardo	4	3

== Results ==
=== Round of 32 ===
Men's

Date	Winners	Score	Opponent	Refs.
27/3/2024	(Argentina) Agustín Tapia (Spain) Arturo Coello	6–3 / 6–2	(Argentina) Cristian German Gutiérrez (Spain) Diego Gil Batista	
26/3/2024	(Spain) Antón Sans (Spain) David Gala Sanchez	6–3 / 5–7 / 6–4	(Spain) Alvaro Cépero (Spain) Jose David Sanchez Serrano	
26/3/2024	(Spain) Gonzalo Rubio (Argentina) Maxi Sánchez	0–6 / 6–4 / 5–0 / W.O.	(Spain) Alvaro Melendez Amaya (Spain) Pedro Melendez Amaya	
26/3/2024	(Brazil) Lucas Bergamini (Spain) Víctor Ruiz	6–2 / 5–2 / W.O.	(Italy) Aris Patiniotis (Italy) Facundo Dominguez	
26/3/2024	(Spain) Coki Nieto (Spain) Jon Sanz	4–6 / 6–2 / 7–5	(Spain) Javi Ruiz (Spain) Pablo Cardona	
26/3/2024	(Argentina) Alex Chozas (Brazil) Lucas Campagnolo	7–6 / 6–1	(Spain) Jose Jimenez Casas (Argentina) Miguel Lamperti	
26/3/2024	(Spain) Arnau Ayats (Argentina) Francisco Guerrero	6–1 / 6–2	(Venezuela) Eduardo Lopez Figuera (Venezuela) Roberto Rodriguez Alonso	
27/3/2024	(Spain) Juan Lebrón (Spain) Momo Gonzalez	7–5 / 6–4	(Spain) Marc Quilez (Spain) Toni Bueno	
27/3/2024	(Spain) Alejandro Galán (Argentina) Federico Chingotto	6–3 / 6–0	(Chile) Javier Valdes (Spain) Rafael Méndez	
27/3/2024	(Spain) Enrique Goenaga (Spain) Teodorp Zapata	6–2 / 6–7 / 6–4	(Spain) Fran Ramirez (France) Thomas Leygue	
26/3/2024	(Argentina) Agustin Gomez Silingo (Portugal) Gustavo Nunes	6–3 / 6–3	(Venezuela) Andres Devletian (Venezuela) Diego Gonzalez Almedo	
27/3/2024	(Spain) Paquito Navarro (Argentina) Sanyo Gutiérrez	7–5 / 6–3	(Spain) Javier Gonzalez Barahona (Spain) Javier García Mora	
27/3/2024	(Spain) Javier Garridoz (Spain) Mike Yanguas	7–6 / 6–3	(Spain) Miguel Semmler (Spain) Pablo Lijó	
26/3/2024	(Argentina) Leandro Augsburger (Argentina) Valentino Libaak	6–4 / 5–7 / 6–4	(Spain) Alejandro Arroyo (Spain) Eduardo Alonso	
27/3/2024	(Spain) Jaime Munoz (Spain) Jairo Bautista	6–1 / 6–4	(Spain) Ivan Ramirez (Spain) Pablo García Rodrigo	
27/3/2024	(Argentina) Franco Stupaczuk (Argentina) Martin Di Nenno	6–1 / 6–2	(Spain) Raul Marcos Duran (Spain) Sergio Alba	

Women's

Date	Winners	Score	Opponent	Refs.
26/3/2024	(Argentina) Daiara Valenzuela (Brazil) Raquel Piltcher	6–3 / 6–2	(Portugal) Catarina Santos Domingos (Netherlands) Rosalie Van Der Hoek	
27/3/2024	(Spain) Lorena Rufo (Spain) Sara Ruiz Soto	6–3 / 6–4	(Spain) Melania Merino (Spain) Sofía Saiz	
27/3/2024	(Argentina) Claudia Jensen (Spain) Jessica Castelló	6–2 / 6–3	(Spain) Marta Talavan (Spain) Nuria Rodriguez	
27/3/2024	(Portugal) Sofia Araújo (Argentina) Virginia Riera	6–2 / 6–0	(Spain) Ana Dominguez Gracia (Spain) Alba Gallardo Salvado	
27/3/2024	(Spain) Laia Rodriguez Abajo (Spain) Sandra Bellver	1–6 / 6–3 / 6–2	(Spain) Marta Barrera (Spain) Marta Caparrós	
26/3/2024	(Portugal) Mafalda Fernandes (Spain) Valeria Atencia	1–6 / 5–4 / W.O.	(Spain) Aitana Garcia Roman (United States) Brittany Dubins	
27/3/2024	(Spain) Anna Ortiz Gasco (Spain) Candela Lucendo Millan	6–2 / 3–6 / 6–2	(Spain) Lucía Peralta (Spain) Nuria Vivancos	
26/3/2024	(France) Alix Collombon (Argentina) Julieta Bidahorria	6–0 / 6–0	(Mexico) Ana Maria Cabrejas Ruiz (Mexico) Camila Ramme Coellar	
27/3/2024	(Spain) Lucia Sainz (Spain) Patty Llaguno	7–5 / 6–2	(Portugal) Ana Catarina Nogueira (Spain) Beatriz Caldera	
26/3/2024	(Spain) Noa Canovas (Spain) Jimena Velasco	6–4 / 6–4	(Argentina) Aranzazu Osoro (Spain) Carmen Goenaga	
26/3/2024	(France) Carla Touly (Portugal) Margarida Fernandes	6–1 / 6–0	(Portugal) Bruna Albuquerque (France) Elodie Invernon	
26/3/2024	(Italy) Carolina Orsi (Spain) Marina Martinez Lobo	6–0 / 6–0	(Venezuela) Maria Natacha Grau (Venezuela) Maria Eugenia Turrillo	

=== Round of 16 ===
Men's

Date	Winners	Score	Opponent	Refs.
28/3/2024	(Argentina) Agustín Tapia (Spain) Arturo Coello	6–3 / 6–4	(Spain) Antón Sans (Spain) David Gala Sanchez	
28/3/2024	(Spain) Gonzalo Rubio (Argentina) Maxi Sánchez	3–6 / 7–5 / 6–3	(Brazil) Lucas Bergamini (Spain) Víctor Ruiz	
28/3/2024	(Spain) Coki Nieto (Spain) Jon Sanz	3–2 / W.O.	(Argentina) Alex Chozas (Brazil) Lucas Campagnolo	
28/3/2024	(Spain) Arnau Ayats (Argentina) Francisco Guerrero	6–4 / 4–1 / W.O.	(Spain) Juan Lebrón (Spain) Momo Gonzalez	
28/3/2024	(Spain) Alejandro Galán (Argentina) Federico Chingotto	6–7 / 7–5 / 6–2	(Spain) Enrique Goenaga (Spain) Teodorp Zapata	
28/3/2024	(Spain) Paquito Navarro (Argentina) Sanyo Gutiérrez	6–2 / 6–4	(Argentina) Agustin Gomez Silingo (Portugal) Gustavo Nunes	
28/3/2024	(Argentina) Leandro Augsburger (Argentina) Valentino Libaak	W.O.	(Spain) Javier Garridoz (Spain) Mike Yanguas	
28/3/2024	(Argentina) Franco Stupaczuk (Argentina) Martin Di Nenno	6–4 / 6–4	(Spain) Jaime Munoz (Spain) Jairo Bautista	

Women's

Date	Winners	Score	Opponent	Refs.
28/3/2024	(Spain) Bea González (Argentina) Delfina Brea	W.O.	(Argentina) Daiara Valenzuela (Brazil) Raquel Piltcher	
28/3/2024	(Spain) Lorena Rufo (Spain) Sara Ruiz Soto	W.O.	(Argentina) Claudia Jensen (Spain) Jessica Castelló	
28/3/2024	(Portugal) Sofia Araújo (Argentina) Virginia Riera	6–4 / 6–2	(Spain) Laia Rodriguez Abajo (Spain) Sandra Bellver	
28/3/2024	(Spain) Marta Ortega (Spain) Verónica Virseda	6–0 / 6–0	(Portugal) Mafalda Fernandes (Spain) Valeria Atencia	
28/3/2024	(Spain) Alejandra Salazar (Spain) Tamara Icardo	6–0 / 6–1	(Spain) Anna Ortiz Gasco (Spain) Candela Lucendo Millan	
28/3/2024	(Spain) Lucia Sainz (Spain) Patty Llaguno	6–1 / 6–1	(France) Alix Collombon (Argentina) Julieta Bidahorria	
28/3/2024	(Spain) Noa Canovas (Spain) Jimena Velasco	6–2 / 6–1	(France) Carla Touly (Portugal) Margarida Fernandes	
28/3/2024	(Spain) Claudia Fernandez (Spain) Gemma Triay	W.O.	(Italy) Carolina Orsi (Spain) Marina Martinez Lobo	

=== Quarter-Finals ===
Men's

Date	Winners	Score	Opponent	Refs.
29/3/2024	(Argentina) Agustín Tapia (Spain) Arturo Coello	7–5 / 6–3	(Spain) Gonzalo Rubio (Argentina) Maxi Sánchez	
29/3/2024	(Spain) Coki Nieto (Spain) Jon Sanz	6–7 / 7–5 / 6–1	(Spain) Arnau Ayats (Argentina) Francisco Guerrero	
29/3/2024	(Spain) Alejandro Galán (Argentina) Federico Chingotto	6–2 / 7–5	(Spain) Paquito Navarro (Argentina) Sanyo Gutiérrez	
29/3/2024	(Argentina) Franco Stupaczuk (Argentina) Martin Di Nenno	7–5 / 6–0	(Argentina) Leandro Augsburger (Argentina) Valentino Libaak	

Women's

Date	Winners	Score	Opponent	Refs.
29/3/2024	(Spain) Bea González (Argentina) Delfina Brea	6–4 / 6–3	(Spain) Lorena Rufo (Spain) Sara Ruiz Soto	
29/3/2024	(Portugal) Sofia Araújo (Argentina) Virginia Riera	6–2 / 7–5	(Spain) Marta Ortega (Spain) Verónica Virseda	
29/3/2024	(Spain) Alejandra Salazar (Spain) Tamara Icardo	6–2 / 6–2	(Spain) Lucia Sainz (Spain) Patty Llaguno	
29/3/2024	(Spain) Claudia Fernandez (Spain) Gemma Triay	6–3 / 3–0 / W.O.	(Spain) Noa Canovas (Spain) Jimena Velasco	

=== Semi-Finals ===
Men's

Date	Winners	Score	Opponent	Refs.
30/3/2024	(Argentina) Agustín Tapia (Spain) Arturo Coello	6–7 / 6–2 / 6–0	(Spain) Coki Nieto (Spain) Jon Sanz	
30/3/2024	(Spain) Alejandro Galán (Argentina) Federico Chingotto	6–4 / 6–3	(Argentina) Franco Stupaczuk (Argentina) Martin Di Nenno	

Women's

Date	Winners	Score	Opponent	Refs.
30/3/2024	(Spain) Bea González (Argentina) Delfina Brea	6–4 / 6–3	(Portugal) Sofia Araújo (Argentina) Virginia Riera	
30/3/2024	(Spain) Alejandra Salazar (Spain) Tamara Icardo	4–3 / W.O.	(Spain) Claudia Fernandez (Spain) Gemma Triay	

=== Finals ===
Men's

Date	Winners	Score	Opponent	Refs.
31/3/2024	(Argentina) Agustín Tapia (Spain) Arturo Coello	2–6 / 6–3 / 6–3	(Spain) Alejandro Galán (Argentina) Federico Chingotto	

Women's

Date	Winners	Score	Opponent	Refs.
31/3/2024	(Spain) Bea González (Argentina) Delfina Brea	6–4 / 6–3	(Spain) Alejandra Salazar (Spain) Tamara Icardo	
