= 2025 Mexico Major =

Padel championships

- Date: 22 – 30 November
- Edition: 3rd
- Category: Major
- Prize money: €807.900
- Location: Acapulco, Mexico
- Venue: Arena GNP Seguros

Champions
- Men's doubles: (Argentina) Agustín Tapia (Spain) Arturo Coello
- Women's doubles: (Spain) Bea González (Spain) Claudia Fernández

Chronology

The 2025 Mexico Major (officially 2025 Premier Padel GNP Acapulco Mexico) was the twenty-second tournament of the fourth season organized by Premier Padel, the premier padel circuit, promoted by the International Padel Federation, and with the financial backing of Nasser Al-Khelaïfi's Qatar Sports Investments.

In the women's category, the pairs ranked No. 1 and No. 3 by the FIP repeated the preivous tournament final, facing each other in a final for the fourth time in 2025. In the title match, Bea González and Claudia Fernández defeated the newly crowned world number ones, Delfina Brea and Gemma Triay, claiming their fifth title of the season.

In the men's category, the two top-ranked pairs faced each other in a final for the seventh consecutive time (including the Pairs World Cup) and for the thirteenth time this season. In the decisive match, Agustín Tapia and Arturo Coello defeated to Alejandro Galán and Federico Chingotto, securing their twelfth title of the season and mathematically securing finishing the year as the world number one ranked pair.

== Relevant Data ==
=== One of the greatest of all time ends her career ===
With 31 seasons as a professional Padel player, having been ranked world number one nine times and world champion eight times (four pairs titles and four national teams titles), and holding over 100 international titles, Carolina Navarro played her final tournament at the Mexico Major, the birthplace of padel.

=== Lebrón and Stupaczuk break-up ===
Following much speculation after their early exit in Egypt, Franco Stupaczuk and Juan Lebrón ended their partnership. Stupaczuk reunited with Martín Di Nenno, with whom he had contended for the world number one spot during the 2023 World Padel Tour season, forming "Version 3.0" of the 'Superpibes'. Meanwhile, Juan Lebrón teamed up with rising star Leandro Augsburger.

=== Delfina and Gemma secure the year-end world number 1 ===
With the Round of 16 defeat of Ariana Sánchez and Paula Josemaría, Delfina Brea and Gemma Triay mathematically secured the year-end world number one ranking, crowning them the new queens of Premier Padel and ending their main rivals' hegemony.

This was the goal that united them for the season, a goal they achieved, completing a historic year in which they won nine titles and reached 14 finals, thereby establishing themselves as the dominant force on the circuit.

=== Bea and Claudia prevent the N.1s sweep of Majors ===
With their tournament victory, Bea González and Claudia Fernández claimed their fifth title of the season, the second "Major" for Claudia and the first for Bea, preventing Delfina and Gemma from winning every Major of the season, as the latter had previously triumphed in Qatar, Rome, and Paris.

=== Coello and Tapia retain the number 1 spot and continue making history ===
By winning the Mexico Major, Agustín Tapia and Arturo Coello secured their 41st title as a pair and confirmed they would finish the year as world number ones for the third consecutive year.

Coello and Tapia also became the third most successful pair in history, reaching 54 finals across 66 tournaments, making the finals 81.8% of the time (winning 41 of the 54 finals played, a 75.9% success rate), and amassing a total of 41 titles: fifteen in 2023, fourteen in 2024, and twelve in 2025 (with the Premier Padel Finals still to be played). These numbers place them as the third most successful pair of all time, trailing only Fernando Belasteguín & Juan Martín Díaz (115 titles) and Ariana Sánchez and Paula Josemaría (42 titles).

== Seeds ==
Male

| Rnk. | Team | FIP Ranking Points |
|---|---|---|
| 1 | (Argentina) Agustín Tapia (Spain) Arturo Coello | 40400 |
| 2 | (Spain) Alejandro Galán (Argentina) Federico Chingotto | 33260 |
| 3 | (Spain) Coki Nieto (Spain) Mike Yanguas | 15390 |
| 4 | (Argentina) Franco Stupaczuk (Argentina) Martin Di Nenno | 14335 |
| 5 | (Spain) Juan Lebrón (Argentina) Leandro Augsburguer | 12790 |
| 6 | (Spain) Jon Sanz (Spain) Paquito Navarro | 11535 |
| 7 | (Spain) Francisco Guerrero (Spain) Momo Gonzalez | 8340 |
| 8 | (Spain) Javi Leal (Brazil) Lucas Bergamini | 8265 |
| 9 | (Spain) Eduardo Alonso (Argentina) Juan Tello | 6825 |
| 10 | (Spain) Javier Garrido (Brazil) Lucas Campagnolo | 5119 |
| 11 | (Spain) Javier Barahona (Spain) Javier Garcia Mora | 5050 |
| 12 | (Spain) Alejandro Ruiz (Spain) Juanlu Esbri | 5000 |
| 13 | (Argentina) Alex Chozas (Argentina) Leonel Aguirre | 4860 |
| 14 | (Spain) Alejandro Arroyo (United Arab Emirates) Inigo Jofre | 4580 |
| 15 | (Argentina) Gonzalo Alfonso (Argentina) Sanyo Gutiérrez | 4441 |
| 16 | (Spain) Jose Garcia Diestro (Spain) Victor Ruiz | 3618 |

Female

| Rnk. | Team | FIP Ranking Points |
|---|---|---|
| 1 | (Argentina) Delfina Brea (Spain) Gemma Triay | 37380 |
| 2 | (Spain) Ariana Sánchez (Spain) Paula Josemaria | 32320 |
| 3 | (Spain) Bea González (Spain) Claudia Fernandéz | 24300 |
| 4 | (Spain) Andrea Ustero (Portugal) Sofia Araújo | 14775 |
| 5 | (Spain) Marta Ortega (Spain) Tamara Icardo | 14090 |
| 6 | (Spain) Alejandra Alonso (Argentina) Claudia Jensen | 10455 |
| 7 | (Spain) Alejandra Salazar (Spain) Martina Calvo | 9950 |
| 8 | (Spain) Marina Guinart (Spain) Veronica Virseda | 8415 |
| 9 | (Argentina) Aranzazu Osoro (Spain) Victoria Iglesias | 6500 |
| 10 | (Spain) Beatriz Caldera (Spain) Carmen Goenaga | 6385 |
| 11 | (Spain) Lucia Sainz (Spain) Raquel Eugenio Barrera | 5235 |
| 12 | (Argentina) Martina Fassio Goyeneche (Spain) Patricia Llaguno | 5015 |
| 13 | (Spain) Jessica Castelló (Spain) Lorena Rufo | 4985 |
| 14 | (Spain) Jimena Velasco (Spain) Marta Barrera | 4260 |
| 15 | (Spain) Araceli Martinez (Italy) Carolina Orsi | 4205 |
| 16 | (Portugal) Ana Catarina Nogueira (Argentina) Virginia Riera | 3539 |

== Head-to-head record between teams ranked in the top 4 during the season ==
=== Man's ===
| Record | Coello–Tapia | Galán–Chingotto | Coki–Yanguas | Di Nenno–Stupaczuk | Former Pairs | Lebrón–Stupaczuk |
| Coello–Tapia | — | 9–4 | 6–0 | — | | 4–1 |
| Galán–Chingotto | 4–9 | — | 6–0 | — | | 6–1 |
| Coki–Yanguas | 0–6 | 0–6 | — | — | | — |
| Di Nenno–Stupaczuk | — | — | — | — | | — |
| Former Pairs | | | | | | |
| Lebrón–Stupaczuk | 1–4 | 1–6 | — | — | | — |

=== Women's ===
| Record | D. Brea–Triay | Ariana–Paula | Gonzalez–Fernandez | Araújo–Ustero | Former Pairs | Araújo–Ortega |
| D. Brea–Triay | — | 7–2 | 2–8 | 5–0 | | 3–0 |
| Ariana–Paula | 2–7 | — | 8–2 | 5–0 | | 1–1 |
| Gonzalez–Fernandez | 8–2 | 2–8 | — | — | | — |
| Araújo–Ustero | 0–5 | 0–5 | — | — | | — |
| Former Pairs | | | | | | |
| Araújo–Ortega | 0–3 | 1–1 | — | — | | — |

Because the Santiago final ended in a draw, it is not counted.

== Draws ==
=== Men's Bracket ===
Round of 32
1 | (Spain) Coello / (Argentina) Tapia | *
32 | (Spain) D. Garcia / (Spain) S. Oria
39 | (Spain) A. Sans / (Spain) M. Quilez | 6 | 3 | 4
16 | (Spain) J.G. Diestro / (Spain) V. Ruiz | 4 | 6 | 6
14 | (Spain) A. Arroyo / (United Arab Emirates) I. Jofre | 6 | 6
31 | (Spain) I. Sager / (Spain) M.H. Hernandez | 3 | 4
18 | (Spain) D. Sánchez / (Spain) P.G. Rodrigo | 6 | 3 | 5
7 | (Spain) F. Guerrero / (Spain) Momo | 4 | 6 | 7
6 | (Spain) J. Sanz / (Spain) Paquito | 6 | 6
38 | (Spain) D. Sastre / (Spain) M. Sintes | 3 | 3
26 | (Spain) F. Cabeza / (Spain) T. Zapata | 6 | 4
13 | (Argentina) A. Chozas / (Argentina) L. Aguirre | 7 | 6
12 | (Spain) A. Ruiz / (Spain) J. Esbri | 7 | 6
Q | (Argentina) J. De Pascual / (Argentina) M. Lamperti | 1 | 5
40 | (Italy) A. Caruso / (Argentina) J.C. Belluati | 4 | 0
4 | (Argentina) Stupaczuk / (Argentina) Di Nenno | 6 | 6
3 | (Spain) Coki / (Spain) Yanguas | 7 | 6
23 | (Spain) J.J. Casas / (Argentina) M.S. Blasco | 6 | 4
Q | (Italy) F. Abbate / (Spain) M. Salguero | 5 | 1
11 | (Spain) J. Barahona / (Spain) J.G. Mora | 7 | 6
10 | (Spain) J. Garrido / (Brazil) L. Campagnolo | 6 | 3 | 6
28 | (Argentina) M. Arce / (Spain) P. Lijó | 3 | 6 | 3
21 | (Spain) G. Collado / (Spain) P.H. Alvarez | 3 | 4
5 | (Spain) Lebrón / (Argentina) L. Augsburger | 6 | 6
8 | (Spain) J. Leal / (Brazil) L. Bergamini | 7 | 3 | 5
17 | (Spain) J. Bautista / (Argentina) V. Libaak | 6 | 6 | 7
22 | (Spain) F. Gil / (Argentina) Maxi | 5 | 6 | 3
15 | (Argentina) G. Alfonso / (Argentina) Sanyo | 7 | 2 | 6
9 | (Spain) E. Alonso / (Argentina) J. Tello | 7 | 7
20 | (Spain) G. Rubio / (Spain) J. Ruiz | 6 | 5
29 | (United Arab Emirates) E. Goenaga / (Spain) L.H. Quesada | 0 | 1
2 | (Argentina) Chingotto / (Spain) Galán | 6 | 6

Round of 16
1 | (Spain) Coello / (Argentina) Tapia | 7 | 6
16 | (Spain) J.G. Diestro / (Spain) V. Ruiz | 5 | 4
14 | (Spain) A. Arroyo / (United Arab Emirates) I. Jofre | 6 | 6
7 | (Spain) F. Guerrero / (Spain) Momo | 7 | 7
6 | (Spain) J. Sanz / (Spain) Paquito | 6 | 7
13 | (Argentina) A. Chozas / (Argentina) L. Aguirre | 2 | 6
12 | (Spain) A. Ruiz / (Spain) J. Esbri | 3 | 5
4 | (Argentina) Stupaczuk / (Argentina) Di Nenno | 6 | 7
3 | (Spain) Coki / (Spain) Yanguas | 7 | 4 | 2
11 | (Spain) J. Barahona / (Spain) J.G. Mora | 5 | 6 | 6
10 | (Spain) J. Garrido / (Brazil) L. Campagnolo | 6 | 4 | 6
5 | (Spain) Lebrón / (Argentina) L. Augsburger | 4 | 6 | 7
17 | (Spain) J. Bautista / (Argentina) V. Libaak | 6 | 3 | 4
15 | (Argentina) G. Alfonso / (Argentina) Sanyo | 3 | 6 | 6
9 | (Spain) E. Alonso / (Argentina) J. Tello | 2 | 2
2 | (Argentina) Chingotto / (Spain) Galán | 6 | 6

Quarter-Final
1 | (Spain) Coello / (Argentina) Tapia | 6 | 6
7 | (Spain) F. Guerrero / (Spain) Momo | 4 | 4
6 | (Spain) J. Sanz / (Spain) Paquito | 6 | 6
4 | (Argentina) Stupaczuk / (Argentina) Di Nenno | 3 | 4
11 | (Spain) J. Barahona / (Spain) J.G. Mora | 2 | 2
5 | (Spain) Lebrón / (Argentina) L. Augsburger | 6 | 6
15 | (Argentina) G. Alfonso / (Argentina) Sanyo | 6 | 1 | 4
2 | (Argentina) Chingotto / (Spain) Galán | 4 | 6 | 6

Semi-Finals
1 | (Spain) Coello / (Argentina) Tapia | 6 | 6 | 6
6 | (Spain) J. Sanz / (Spain) Paquito | 2 | 7 | 3
5 | (Spain) Lebrón / (Argentina) L. Augsburger | 2 | 3
2 | (Argentina) Chingotto / (Spain) Galán | 6 | 6

Finals
1 | (Spain) Coello / (Argentina) Tapia | 6 | 7
2 | (Argentina) Chingotto / (Spain) Galán | 4 | 6

=== Women's Bracket ===
Round of 32
1 | (Argentina) D. Brea / (Spain) G. Triay
Bye
19 | (Spain) L. Martinez / (Spain) N. Rodriguez | 0 | 3
12 | (Argentina) M. Goyeneche / (Spain) P. Llaguno | 6 | 6
9 | (Argentina) A. Osoro / (Spain) V. Iglesias | 6 | 6
27 | (Spain) B. Las Heras / (Spain) J. Bautista | 3 | 0
Q | (Spain) N. Diaz / (Spain) R. Lopez | 1 | 3
5 | (Spain) M. Ortega / (Spain) T. Icardo | 6 | 6
8 | (Spain) M. Guinart / (Spain) V. Virseda | 6 | 6
22 | (France) A. Collombon / (Spain) J. Cabruja | 4 | 2
26 | (Sweden) C. Navarro / (Spain) M. Merino | 7 | 6
16 | (Portugal) A. Nogueira / (Argentina) V. Riera | 5 | 1
10 | (Spain) B. Caldera / (Spain) C. Goenaga | 7 | 6
31 | (Italy) G. Dal Pozzo / (Spain) S. Bellver | 3 | 6
Bye
4 | (Spain) A. Ustero / (Portugal) S. Araújo
3 | (Spain) B. González / (Spain) C. Fernández
Bye
30 | (Spain) E. Carnicero / (Spain) P. Martinez | 0 | 1
14 | (Spain) M. Barrera / (Spain) J. Velasco | 6 | 6
11 | (Spain) L. Sainz / (Spain) R. Barrera | 6 | 6
25 | (Spain) L. Manquillo / (Spain) L. Luján | 3 | 1
29 | (Spain) M. Arellano / (Spain) M. Borrero | 1 | 6
7 | (Spain) A. Salazar / (Spain) M. Calvo | 6 | 7
6 | (Spain) A. Alonso / (Argentina) C. Jensen | 6 | 7
17 | (Spain) M.R. Abajo / (Spain) N. Canovas | 2 | 5
33 | (Spain) A. Moral / (Spain) L. Trella | 4 | 6 | 6
15 | (Spain) A. Martinez / (Italy) C. Orsi | 6 | 4 | 2
13 | (Spain) J. Castelló / (Spain) L. Rufo | 6 | 6
18 | (Spain) A. Perez / (Spain) M. Caparros | 4 | 4
Bye
2 | (Spain) A. Sánchez / (Spain) P. Josemaria

Round of 16
1 | (Argentina) D. Brea / (Spain) G. Triay | 6 | 6
12 | (Argentina) M. Goyeneche / (Spain) P. Llaguno | 1 | 2
9 | (Argentina) A. Osoro / (Spain) V. Iglesias | 7 | 6
5 | (Spain) M. Ortega / (Spain) T. Icardo | 6 | 2
8 | (Spain) M. Guinart / (Spain) V. Virseda | 6 | 6
26 | (Sweden) C. Navarro / (Spain) M. Merino | 2 | 2
10 | (Spain) B. Caldera / (Spain) C. Goenaga | 6 | 7 | 6
4 | (Spain) A. Ustero / (Portugal) S. Araújo | 7 | 5 | 4
3 | (Spain) B. González / (Spain) C. Fernández | 6 | 6
14 | (Spain) M. Barrera / (Spain) J. Velasco | 0 | 1
11 | (Spain) L. Sainz / (Spain) R. Barrera | 6 | 6
7 | (Spain) A. Salazar / (Spain) M. Calvo | 4 | 2
6 | (Spain) A. Alonso / (Argentina) C. Jensen | 6 | 6
33 | (Spain) A. Moral / (Spain) L. Trella | 2 | 1
13 | (Spain) J. Castelló / (Spain) L. Rufo | 6 | 6
2 | (Spain) A. Sánchez / (Spain) P. Josemaria | 4 | 4

Quarter-Final
1 | (Argentina) D. Brea / (Spain) G. Triay | 6 | 6
9 | (Argentina) A. Osoro / (Spain) V. Iglesias | 3 | 2
8 | (Spain) M. Guinart / (Spain) V. Virseda | 4 | 6 | 4
10 | (Spain) B. Caldera / (Spain) C. Goenaga | 6 | 0 | 6
3 | (Spain) B. González / (Spain) C. Fernández | 7 | 6
11 | (Spain) L. Sainz / (Spain) R. Barrera | 6 | 2
6 | (Spain) A. Alonso / (Argentina) C. Jensen | 6 | 2 | 6
13 | (Spain) J. Castelló / (Spain) L. Rufo | 2 | 6 | 4

Semi-Finals
1 | (Argentina) D. Brea / (Spain) G. Triay | 7 | 2 | 6
10 | (Spain) B. Caldera / (Spain) C. Goenaga
3 | (Spain) B. González / (Spain) C. Fernández | 6 | 6
6 | (Spain) A. Alonso / (Argentina) C. Jensen | 3 | 2

Finals
1 | (Argentina) D. Brea / (Spain) G. Triay | 2 | 4
3 | (Spain) B. González / (Spain) C. Fernández | 6 | 6

== Results ==
=== First Round ===
Men's

| Date | Winners | Score | Opponent | Refs. |
|---|---|---|---|---|
| 25/11/2025 | (Spain) Diego García (Spain) Salvador Oria | 6–1 / 6–4 | (Mexico) Diego Arredondo (Mexico) Jose Pablo Padilla | |
| 24/11/2025 | (Spain) Anton Sans Riola (Spain) Marc Quilez | 6–4 / 6–4 | (Argentina) Federico Mouriño (Argentina) Ramiro Valenzuela | |
| 25/11/2025 | (Spain) Ignacio Sager (Spain) Mario Huete Hernandez | 6–3 / 7–5 | (Argentina) Juan Pablo Dametto (Argentina) Mateo Rivero | |
| 25/11/2025 | (Spain) David Gala Sánchez (Spain) Pablo García Rodrigo | 6–4 / 6–7 / 6–4 | (Spain) Alvaro Cepero (Argentina) Eduardo Agustin Torre | |
| 25/11/2025 | (Spain) Daniel Santigosa (Spain) Marc Sintes | 6–2 / 6–0 | (Mexico) Pablo Acevedo Iturribarria (Mexico) Pablo Francisco Amora | |
| 25/11/2025 | (Spain) Francisco Cabeza (Spain) Teodoro Zapata | 6–2 / 6–2 | (Spain) Albert Roglan Pons (Spain) Ferran Insa | |
| 25/11/2025 | (Argentina) Juan Ignacio De Pascual (Argentina) Miguel Lamperti | 1–6 / 6–3 / 6–2 | (Italy) Denis Perino (Argentina) Ignacio Piotto | |
| 24/11/2025 | (Italy) Alvaro Montiel (Argentina) Juan Cruz Belluati | 6–4 / 7–5 | (Portugal) Miguel Deus (Portugal) Nuno Deus | |
| 25/11/2025 | (Spain) Jose Jimenez Casas (Argentina) Maxi Sanchez Blasco | 6–2 / 7–5 | (Spain) Mario Del Castillo (Spain) Pincho Fernandez | |
| 25/11/2025 | (Italy) Flavio Abbate (Spain) Manuel Castaño | 2–6 / 7–5 / 6–4 | (Spain) Aimar Goñi (Argentina) Lucho Capra | |
| 24/11/2025 | (Argentina) Maximiliano Arce (Spain) Pablo Lijó | 6–4 / 6–4 | (Italy) Aris Patiniotis (Spain) Jesus Moya | |
| 25/11/2025 | (Spain) Guillermo Collado (Spain) Pol Hernandez | 6–3 / 7–5 | (Argentina) Agustín Gutiérez (Chile) Javier Valdes | |
| 25/11/2025 | (Spain) Jairo Bautista (Argentina) Valentino Libaak | 6–2 / 6–2 | (Italy) Facundo Dominguez (Spain) Javier Martinez Vazquez | |
| 25/11/2025 | (Spain) Francisco Gil Morales (Argentina) Maxi Sánchez | 4–6 / 6–3 / 7–5 | (Spain) Alonso Rodriguez (Argentina) Juan Ignacio Rubini | |
| 24/11/2025 | (Spain) Gonzalo Rubio (Spain) Javi Ruiz | 6–4 / 7–5 | (Argentina) Juan Argañaras (Argentina) Matías Almada | |
| 25/11/2025 | (Spain) Enrique Goenaga (Spain) Luis Hernandez Quesada | 7–5 / 6–2 | (Spain) Emilio Sanchez Chamero (Italy) Enzo Jensen | |

Women's

| Date | Winners | Score | Opponent | Refs. |
|---|---|---|---|---|
| 25/11/2025 | (Spain) Lucia Martinez Gomez (Spain) Nuria Rodriguez | 6–2 / 6–1 | (Spain) Alicia Blanco Rojo (Spain) Sara Ruiz Soto | |
| 25/11/2025 | (Spain) Barbara Las Heras (Spain) Julia Polo Bautista | 7–6 / 6–3 | (Russia) Ksenia Sharifova (Spain) Marina Martinez Lobo | |
| 25/11/2025 | (Spain) Natividad Lopez Díaz (Spain) Rebeca Lopez | 6–3 / 1–6 / 6–2 | (Argentina) Daiara Valenzuela (Brazil) Raquel Piltcher | |
| 25/11/2025 | (France) Alix Collombon (Spain) Jana Montes Cabruja | 6–1 / 6–0 | (Mexico) Natalia Blanco (Mexico) Renata Martinez | |
| 24/11/2025 | (Sweden) Carolina Navarro Björk (Spain) Melania Merino | 6–2 / 6–2 | (Spain) Aida Martinez San Juan (Spain) Ana Dominguez Gracia | |
| 25/11/2025 | (Italy) Giulia Dal Pozzo (Spain) Sandra Bellver | 5–7 / 7–5 / 6–4 | (Italy) Giorgia Marchetti (France) Lea Godallier | |
| 24/11/2025 | (Spain) Esther Carnicero (Spain) Patricia Martinez Fortun | 3–6 / 6–3 / 6–3 | (Spain) Noemi Aguilar (Spain) Teresa Navarro | |
| 25/11/2025 | (Spain) Laura Lujan Rodriguez (Spain) Letizia Manquillo | 6–1 / 6–4 | (Spain) Ariadna Cañellas (Italy) Carlotta Casali | |
| 25/11/2025 | (Spain) Marta Arellano (Spain) Marta Borrero | 7–5 / 6–4 | (Argentina) Julieta Bidahorria (Spain) Lara Arruabarrena | |
| 25/11/2025 | (Spain) Laia Rodriguez Abajo (Spain) Noa Canovas | 6–2 / 2–6 / 6–2 | (France) Carla Touly (Spain) Lucía Peralta | |
| 24/11/2025 | (Spain) Amanda Lopez Moral (Spain) Lucía García Trella | 6–1 / 6–3 | (Mexico) Ana María Cabrejas (Mexico) Camila Ramme Coellar | |
| 24/11/2025 | (Spain) Agueda Perez (Spain) Marta Caparros | 3–6 / 6–4 / 7–5 | (Spain) Marta Talavan (Spain) Sofía Saiz Vallejo | |

=== Round of 32 ===
Men's

| Date | Winners | Score | Opponent | Refs. |
|---|---|---|---|---|
| 26/11/2025 | (Argentina) Agustín Tapia (Spain) Arturo Coello | W.O. | (Spain) Diego García (Spain) Salvador Oria | |
| 26/11/2025 | (Spain) Jose García Diestro (Spain) Victor Ruiz | 4–6 / 6–3 / 6–4 | (Spain) Anton Sans Riola (Spain) Marc Quilez | |
| 26/11/2025 | (Spain) Alex Arroyo (United Arab Emirates) Iñigo Jofre | 6–3 / 6–4 | (Spain) Ignacio Sager (Spain) Mario Huete Hernandez | |
| 26/11/2025 | (Spain) Francisco Guerrero (Spain) Momo Gonzalez | 4–6 / 6–3 / 7–5 | (Spain) David Gala Sánchez (Spain) Pablo García Rodrigo | |
| 26/11/2025 | (Spain) Jon Sanz (Spain) Paquito Navarro | 6–3 / 6–3 | (Spain) Daniel Santigosa (Spain) Marc Sintes | |
| 26/11/2025 | (Argentina) Alex Chozas (Argentina) Leonel Aguirre | 7–6 / 6–4 | (Spain) Francisco Cabeza (Spain) Teodoro Zapata | |
| 26/11/2025 | (Spain) Aléx Ruiz (Spain) Juanlu Esbri | 6–1 / 7–5 | (Argentina) Juan Ignacio De Pascual (Argentina) Miguel Lamperti | |
| 26/11/2025 | (Argentina) Franco Stupaczuk (Argentina) Martin Di Nenno | 6–4 / 6–0 | (Italy) Alvaro Montiel (Argentina) Juan Cruz Belluati | |
| 26/11/2025 | (Spain) Coki Nieto (Spain) Mike Yanguas | 7–6 / 6–4 | (Spain) Jose Jimenez Casas (Argentina) Maxi Sanchez Blasco | |
| 26/11/2025 | (Spain) Javier Barahona (Spain) Javier García Mora | 7–5 / 6–1 | (Italy) Flavio Abbate (Spain) Manuel Castaño | |
| 26/11/2025 | (Spain) Javi Garrido (Brazil) Lucas Campagnolo | 6–3 / 3–6 / 6–3 | (Argentina) Maximiliano Arce (Spain) Pablo Lijó | |
| 26/11/2025 | (Spain) Juan Lebrón (Argentina) Leandro Augsburger | 6–3 / 6–4 | (Spain) Guillermo Collado (Spain) Pol Hernandez | |
| 26/11/2025 | (Spain) Jairo Bautista (Argentina) Valentino Libaak | 6–7 / 6–3 / 7–5 | (Spain) Javi Leal (Brazil) Lucas Bergamini | |
| 26/11/2025 | (Argentina) Gonzalo Alfonso (Argentina) Sanyo Gutiérrez | 7–5 / 2–6 / 6–3 | (Spain) Francisco Gil Morales (Argentina) Maxi Sánchez | |
| 26/11/2025 | (Spain) Eduardo Alonso (Argentina) Juan Tello | 7–6 / 7–5 | (Spain) Gonzalo Rubio (Spain) Javi Ruiz | |
| 26/11/2025 | (Spain) Alejandro Galán (Argentina) Federico Chingotto | 6–0 / 6–1 | (Spain) Enrique Goenaga (Spain) Luis Hernandez Quesada | |

Women's

| Date | Winners | Score | Opponent | Refs. |
|---|---|---|---|---|
| 26/11/2025 | (Argentina) Martina Fassio Goyeneche (Spain) Patricia Llaguno | 6–0 / 6–3 | (Spain) Lucia Martinez Gomez (Spain) Nuria Rodriguez | |
| 26/11/2025 | (Argentina) Aranzazu Osoro (Spain) Victoria Iglesias | 6–3 / 6–0 | (Spain) Barbara Las Heras (Spain) Julia Polo Bautista | |
| 26/11/2025 | (Spain) Marta Ortega (Spain) Tamara Icardo | 6–1 / 6–3 | (Spain) Natividad Lopez Díaz (Spain) Rebeca Lopez | |
| 26/11/2025 | (Spain) Marina Guinart (Spain) Verónica Virseda | 6–4 / 6–2 | (France) Alix Collombon (Spain) Jana Montes Cabruja | |
| 26/11/2025 | (Sweden) Carolina Navarro Björk (Spain) Melania Merino | 7–5 / 6–1 | (Portugal) Ana Catarina Nogueira (Argentina) Virginia Riera | |
| 26/11/2025 | (Spain) Beatriz Caldera (Spain) Carmen Goenaga | 6–3 / 7–6 | (Italy) Giulia Dal Pozzo (Spain) Sandra Bellver | |
| 26/11/2025 | (Spain) Jimena Velasco (Spain) Marta Barrera | 6–0 / 6–1 | (Spain) Esther Carnicero (Spain) Patricia Martinez Fortun | |
| 26/11/2025 | (Spain) Lucia Sainz (Spain) Raquel Eugenio Barrera | 6–3 / 6–1 | (Spain) Laura Lujan Rodriguez (Spain) Letizia Manquillo | |
| 26/11/2025 | (Spain) Alejandra Salazar (Spain) Martina Calvo | 6–1 / 7–6 | (Spain) Marta Arellano (Spain) Marta Borrero | |
| 26/11/2025 | (Spain) Alejandra Alonso (Argentina) Claudia Jensen | 6–2 / 7–5 | (Spain) Laia Rodriguez Abajo (Spain) Noa Canovas | |
| 26/11/2025 | (Spain) Amanda Lopez Moral (Spain) Lucía García Trella | 4–6 / 6–4 / 6–2 | (Spain) Araceli Martinez (Italy) Carolina Orsi | |
| 26/11/2025 | (Spain) Jessica Castelló (Spain) Lorena Rufo | 6–4 / 6–4 | (Spain) Agueda Perez (Spain) Marta Caparros | |

=== Round of 16 ===
Men's

| Date | Winners | Score | Opponent | Refs. |
|---|---|---|---|---|
| 27/11/2025 | (Argentina) Agustín Tapia (Spain) Arturo Coello | 7–5 / 6–4 | (Spain) Jose García Diestro (Spain) Victor Ruiz | |
| 27/11/2025 | (Spain) Francisco Guerrero (Spain) Momo Gonzalez | 7–6 / 7–6 | (Spain) Alex Arroyo (United Arab Emirates) Iñigo Jofre | |
| 27/11/2025 | (Spain) Jon Sanz (Spain) Paquito Navarro | 6–2 / 7–6 | (Argentina) Alex Chozas (Argentina) Leonel Aguirre | |
| 27/11/2025 | (Argentina) Franco Stupaczuk (Argentina) Martin Di Nenno | 6–3 / 7–5 | (Spain) Aléx Ruiz (Spain) Juanlu Esbri | |
| 27/11/2025 | (Spain) Javier Barahona (Spain) Javier García Mora | 5–7 / 6–4 / 6–2 | (Spain) Coki Nieto (Spain) Mike Yanguas | |
| 27/11/2025 | (Spain) Juan Lebrón (Argentina) Leandro Augsburger | 4–6 / 6–4 / 7–6 | (Spain) Javi Garrido (Brazil) Lucas Campagnolo | |
| 27/11/2025 | (Argentina) Gonzalo Alfonso (Argentina) Sanyo Gutiérrez | 3–6 / 6–3 / 6–4 | (Spain) Jairo Bautista (Argentina) Valentino Libaak | |
| 27/11/2025 | (Spain) Alejandro Galán (Argentina) Federico Chingotto | 6–2 / 6–2 | (Spain) Eduardo Alonso (Argentina) Juan Tello | |

Women's

| Date | Winners | Score | Opponent | Refs. |
|---|---|---|---|---|
| 27/11/2025 | (Argentina) Delfina Brea (Spain) Gemma Triay | 6–1 / 6–2 | (Argentina) Martina Fassio Goyeneche (Spain) Patricia Llaguno | |
| 27/11/2025 | (Argentina) Aranzazu Osoro (Spain) Victoria Iglesias | 7–6 / 6–2 | (Spain) Marta Ortega (Spain) Tamara Icardo | |
| 27/11/2025 | (Spain) Marina Guinart (Spain) Verónica Virseda | 6–2 / 6–2 | (Sweden) Carolina Navarro Björk (Spain) Melania Merino | |
| 27/11/2025 | (Spain) Beatriz Caldera (Spain) Carmen Goenaga | 6–7 / 7–5 / 6–4 | (Spain) Andrea Ustero (Portugal) Sofia Araújo | |
| 27/11/2025 | (Spain) Bea González (Spain) Claudia Fernandéz | 6–0 / 6–1 | (Spain) Jimena Velasco (Spain) Marta Barrera | |
| 27/11/2025 | (Spain) Lucia Sainz (Spain) Raquel Eugenio Barrera | 6–4 / 6–2 | (Spain) Alejandra Salazar (Spain) Martina Calvo | |
| 27/11/2025 | (Spain) Alejandra Alonso (Argentina) Claudia Jensen | 6–2 / 6–1 | (Spain) Amanda Lopez Moral (Spain) Lucía García Trella | |
| 27/11/2025 | (Spain) Jessica Castelló (Spain) Lorena Rufo | 6–4 / 6–4 | (Spain) Ariana Sánchez (Spain) Paula Josemaría | |

=== Quarter-Finals ===
Men's

| Date | Winners | Score | Opponent | Refs. |
|---|---|---|---|---|
| 28/11/2025 | (Argentina) Agustín Tapia (Spain) Arturo Coello | 6–4 / 6–4 | (Spain) Francisco Guerrero (Spain) Momo Gonzalez | |
| 28/11/2025 | (Spain) Jon Sanz (Spain) Paquito Navarro | 6–3 / 6–4 | (Argentina) Franco Stupaczuk (Argentina) Martin Di Nenno | |
| 28/11/2025 | (Spain) Juan Lebrón (Argentina) Leandro Augsburger | 6–2 / 6–2 | (Spain) Javier Barahona (Spain) Javier García Mora | |
| 28/11/2025 | (Spain) Alejandro Galán (Argentina) Federico Chingotto | 4–6 / 6–1 / 6–4 | (Argentina) Gonzalo Alfonso (Argentina) Sanyo Gutiérrez | |

Women's

| Date | Winners | Score | Opponent | Refs. |
|---|---|---|---|---|
| 28/11/2025 | (Argentina) Delfina Brea (Spain) Gemma Triay | 6–3 / 6–2 | (Argentina) Aranzazu Osoro (Spain) Victoria Iglesias | |
| 28/11/2025 | (Spain) Beatriz Caldera (Spain) Carmen Goenaga | 6–4 / 0–6 / 6–4 | (Spain) Marina Guinart (Spain) Verónica Virseda | |
| 28/11/2025 | (Spain) Bea González (Spain) Claudia Fernandéz | 7–6 / 6–2 | (Spain) Lucia Sainz (Spain) Raquel Eugenio Barrera | |
| 28/11/2025 | (Spain) Alejandra Alonso (Argentina) Claudia Jensen | 6–2 / 2–6 / 6–4 | (Spain) Jessica Castelló (Spain) Lorena Rufo | |

=== Semi-Finals ===
Men's

| Date | Winners | Score | Opponent | Refs. |
|---|---|---|---|---|
| 29/11/2025 | (Argentina) Agustín Tapia (Spain) Arturo Coello | 6–2 / 6–7 / 6–3 | (Spain) Jon Sanz (Spain) Paquito Navarro | |
| 29/11/2025 | (Spain) Alejandro Galán (Argentina) Federico Chingotto | 6–2 / 6–3 | (Spain) Juan Lebrón (Argentina) Leandro Augsburger | |

Women's

| Date | Winners | Score | Opponent | Refs. |
|---|---|---|---|---|
| 29/11/2025 | (Argentina) Delfina Brea (Spain) Gemma Triay | 7–6 / 2–6 / 6–3 | (Spain) Beatriz Caldera (Spain) Carmen Goenaga | |
| 29/11/2025 | (Spain) Bea González (Spain) Claudia Fernandéz | 6–3 / 6–2 | (Spain) Alejandra Alonso (Argentina) Claudia Jensen | |

=== Finals ===
Men's

| Date | Winners | Score | Opponent | Refs. |
|---|---|---|---|---|
| 30/11/2025 | (Argentina) Agustín Tapia (Spain) Arturo Coello | 6–4 / 7–6 | (Spain) Alejandro Galán (Argentina) Federico Chingotto | |

Women's

| Date | Winners | Score | Opponent | Refs. |
|---|---|---|---|---|
| 30/11/2025 | (Spain) Bea González (Spain) Claudia Fernandéz | 6–2 / 6–4 | (Argentina) Delfina Brea (Spain) Gemma Triay | |
