= 2025 Dubai P1 =

Padel championships

- Date: 9 – 16 November
- Edition: 2nd
- Category: P1
- Prize money: €474.500
- Location: Dubai, United Arab Emirates
- Venue: Hamdan Sports Complex

Champions
- Men's doubles: (Argentina) Agustín Tapia (Spain) Arturo Coello
- Women's doubles: (Spain) Bea González (Spain) Claudia Fernández

Chronology

The 2025 Dubai P1 (officially 2025 Premier Padel Dubai P1) was the twenty-first tournament of the fourth season organized by Premier Padel, the premier padel circuit, promoted by the International Padel Federation, and with the financial backing of Nasser Al-Khelaïfi's Qatar Sports Investments.

In the women's category, the pairs ranked No. 1 and No. 3 by the FIP faced each other in a final for the third time in 2025. In the title match, Bea González and Claudia Fernández defeated the world number ones, Delfina Brea and Gemma Triay, claiming their fourth title of the season.

In the men's category, the two top-ranked pairs faced each other in a final for the sixth consecutive time (including the Pairs World Cup) and for the twelfth time this season. In the title match, Agustín Tapia and Arturo Coello avenged their two previous losses to Alejandro Galán and Federico Chingotto, securing their eleventh title of the season.

== Relevant Data ==
=== Claudia Fernandez makes history ===
With this tournament victory, Claudia Fernández, at just 19 years, 8 months, and 8 days old, became the youngest player to reach 10 professional titles across the World Padel Tour and Premier Padel eras. She achieved this milestone by winning the Dubai P1, surpassing records set by Bea González (who reached the mark at 22 years and 17 days) and Ariana Sánchez (22 years, 11 months, and 16 days).

=== Effects on the ranking ===
With Arturo Coello and Tapia's victory, they are just one title win at the Mexico Major away from securing the year-end number one ranking, while Delfina Brea and Gemma Triay need only reach the semifinals to finish the year in the top spot.

== Seeds ==
Male

Rnk.	Team	FIP Ranking Points
1	(Argentina) Agustín Tapia (Spain) Arturo Coello	40000
2	(Spain) Alejandro Galán (Argentina) Federico Chingotto	29980
3	(Argentina) Franco Stupaczuk (Spain) Juan Lebrón	17100
4	(Spain) Coki Nieto (Spain) Mike Yanguas	15090
5	(Spain) Jon Sanz (Spain) Paquito Navarro	10500
6	(Argentina) Leandro Augsburguer (Argentina) Martin Di Nenno	9995
7	(Brazil) Lucas Bergamini (Spain) Javi Leal	8175
8	(Spain) Francisco Guerrero (Spain) Momo Gonzalez	8020
9	(Spain) Eduardo Alonso (Argentina) Juan Tello	6577
10	(Spain) Javier Barahona (Spain) Javier Garcia Mora	5180
11	(Spain) Alejandro Ruiz (Spain) Juanlu Esbri	4775
12	(Spain) Alejandro Arroyo (United Arab Emirates) Inigo Jofre	4647
13	(Spain) Javier Garrido (Brazil) Lucas Campagnolo	4444
14	(Argentina) Gonzalo Alfonso (Argentina) Sanyo Gutiérrez	4202
15	(Spain) Jairo Bautista (Argentina) Valentino Libaak	4072
16	(Argentina) Alex Chozas (Argentina) Leonel Aguirre	4072

Female

Rnk.	Team	FIP Ranking Points
1	(Argentina) Delfina Brea (Spain) Gemma Triay	36100
2	(Spain) Ariana Sánchez (Spain) Paula Josemaria	30320
3	(Spain) Bea González (Spain) Claudia Fernandéz	23900
4	(Spain) Andrea Ustero (Portugal) Sofia Araújo	13905
5	(Spain) Marta Ortega (Spain) Tamara Icardo	13190
6	(Spain) Alejandra Alonso (Argentina) Claudia Jensen	10485
7	(Spain) Alejandra Salazar (Spain) Martina Calvo	9200
8	(Spain) Marina Guinart (Spain) Veronica Virseda	7830
9	(Argentina) Aranzazu Osoro (Spain) Victoria Iglesias	6635
10	(Spain) Beatriz Caldera (Spain) Carmen Goenaga	6270
11	(Spain) Lucia Sainz (Spain) Raquel Eugenio Barrera	5105
12	(Spain) Jessica Castelló (Spain) Lorena Rufo	5095
13	(Argentina) Martina Fassio Goyeneche (Spain) Patricia Llaguno	4885
14	(Spain) Jimena Velasco (Spain) Marta Barrera	4070
15	(Spain) Araceli Martinez (Italy) Carolina Orsi	3980
16	(Portugal) Ana Catarina Nogueira (Argentina) Virginia Riera	3516

== Head-to-head record between teams ranked in the top 4 during the season ==
=== Man's ===
Record	Coello–Tapia	Galán–Chingotto	Lebrón–Stupaczuk	Coki–Yanguas
Coello–Tapia	—	8–4	4–1	6–0
Galán–Chingotto	4–8	—	6–1	6–0
Lebrón–Stupaczuk	1–4	1–6	—	—
Coki–Yanguas	0–6	0–6	—	—

=== Women's ===
Record	D. Brea–Triay	Ariana–Paula	Gonzalez–Fernandez	Araújo–Ustero	Former Pairs	Araújo–Ortega
D. Brea–Triay	—	7–2	2–7	5–0		3–0
Ariana–Paula	2–7	—	8–2	5–0		1–1
Gonzalez–Fernandez	7–2	2–8	—	—		—
Araújo–Ustero	0–5	0–5	—	—		—
Former Pairs						
Araújo–Ortega	0–3	1–1	—	—		—

Because the Santiago final ended in a draw, it is not counted.

== Draws ==
=== Men's Bracket ===
Round of 32
1	(Spain) Coello / (Argentina) Tapia	6	6
WC	(United Arab Emirates) F. Sosa / (United Arab Emirates) S. Icardo	1	1
34	(Argentina) F. Mouriño / (Argentina) R. Valenzuela	4	1
16	(Argentina) A. Chozas / (Argentina) L. Aguirre	6	6
12	(Spain) A. Arroyo / (United Arab Emirates) I. Jofre	6	6
Q	(Spain) M.H. Hernandez / (Spain) M. Ortega	4	2
35	(Argentina) A. Gutiérrez / (Chile) J. Valdes	3	3
7	(Spain) J. Leal / (Brazil) L. Bergamini	6	6
8	(Spain) F. Guerrero / (Spain) Momo	6	6
27	(Italy) D. Perino / (Argentina) I. Piotto	1	1
28	(Spain) A.F. Lancha / (Spain) I. Sager	7	6
14	(Argentina) G. Alfonso / (Argentina) Sanyo	6	4
13	(Spain) J. Garrido / (Brazil) L. Campagnolo	6	6
29	(Argentina) M. Arce / (Spain) P. Lijó	4	4
20	(Spain) F. Gil / (Argentina) Maxi	5	4
4	(Spain) Coki / (Spain) Yanguas	7	6
3	(Spain) Lebrón / (Argentina) Stupaczuk	6	6
26	(Spain) J.J. Casas / (Argentina) M.S. Blasco	1	1
37	(Italy) A. Caruso / (Argentina) J.C. Belluati	4	1
15	(Spain) J. Bautista / (Argentina) V. Libaak	6	6
11	(Spain) A. Ruiz / (Spain) J. Esbri	7	6
22	(Spain) D. Sánchez / (Spain) P.G. Rodrigo	6	2
32	(United Arab Emirates) E. Goenaga / (Spain) L.H. Quesada	6	4
6	(Argentina) Di Nenno / (Argentina) L. Augsburger	7	6
5	(Spain) J. Sanz / (Spain) Paquito	7	7
19	(Portugal) M. Deus / (Portugal) N. Deus	6	6
Q	(Spain) E. Chamero / (Italy) E. Jensen	3	6	3
9	(Spain) E. Alonso / (Argentina) J. Tello	6	3	6
10	(Spain) J. Barahona / (Spain) J.G. Mora	1	1
23	(Spain) G. Collado / (Spain) P.H. Alvarez	6	6
25	(Spain) A. Goñi / (Argentina) L. Capra	7	4	1
2	(Argentina) Chingotto / (Spain) Galán	5	6	6

Round of 16
1	(Spain) Coello / (Argentina) Tapia	7	6
16	(Argentina) A. Chozas / (Argentina) L. Aguirre	5	3
12	(Spain) A. Arroyo / (United Arab Emirates) I. Jofre	1	4
7	(Spain) J. Leal / (Brazil) L. Bergamini	6	6
8	(Spain) F. Guerrero / (Spain) Momo	6	6
28	(Spain) A.F. Lancha / (Spain) I. Sager	4	1
13	(Spain) J. Garrido / (Brazil) L. Campagnolo	3	6	6
4	(Spain) Coki / (Spain) Yanguas	6	4	4
3	(Spain) Lebrón / (Argentina) Stupaczuk	7	7
15	(Spain) J. Bautista / (Argentina) V. Libaak	6	6
11	(Spain) A. Ruiz / (Spain) J. Esbri	6	6	0
6	(Argentina) Di Nenno / (Argentina) L. Augsburger	4	7	6
5	(Spain) J. Sanz / (Spain) Paquito	2	6	6
9	(Spain) E. Alonso / (Argentina) J. Tello	6	3	7
23	(Spain) G. Collado / (Spain) P.H. Alvarez	3	1
2	(Argentina) Chingotto / (Spain) Galán	6	6

Quarter-Final
1	(Spain) Coello / (Argentina) Tapia	6	6
7	(Spain) J. Leal / (Brazil) L. Bergamini	1	2
8	(Spain) F. Guerrero / (Spain) Momo	4	7	4
13	(Spain) J. Garrido / (Brazil) L. Campagnolo	6	6	6
3	(Spain) Lebrón / (Argentina) Stupaczuk	4	6	7
6	(Argentina) Di Nenno / (Argentina) L. Augsburger	6	3	6
9	(Spain) E. Alonso / (Argentina) J. Tello	6	4
2	(Argentina) Chingotto / (Spain) Galán	7	6

Semi-Finals
1	(Spain) Coello / (Argentina) Tapia	6	7
13	(Spain) J. Garrido / (Brazil) L. Campagnolo	4	6
3	(Spain) Lebrón / (Argentina) Stupaczuk	1	6
2	(Argentina) Chingotto / (Spain) Galán	6	7

Finals
1	(Spain) Coello / (Argentina) Tapia	6	6
2	(Argentina) Chingotto / (Spain) Galán	3	4

=== Women's Bracket ===
Round of 32
1	(Argentina) D. Brea / (Spain) G. Triay
Bye
10	(Spain) B. Caldera / (Spain) C. Goenaga	7	7
23	(Spain) M. Talavan / (Spain) S. Saiz	6	6
22	(France) A. Collombon / (Spain) J. Cabruja	7	2	6
20	(Russia) K. Sharifova / (Spain) M. Lobo	5	6	4
17	(Spain) A. Perez / (Spain) M. Caparros	1	2
8	(Spain) M. Guinart / (Spain) V. Virseda	6	6
6	(Spain) A. Alonso / (Argentina) C. Jensen	6	6
Q	(Italy) G. Marchetti / (France) L. Godallier	4	4
Q	(Spain) L. Manquillo / (Spain) L. Luján	7	4	2
21	(Spain) M.R. Abajo / (Spain) N. Canovas	6	6	6
18	(Spain) L. Martinez / (Spain) N. Rodriguez	6	6
WC	(Spain) A. Cañellas / (Italy) C. Casali
Bye
4	(Spain) A. Ustero / (Portugal) S. Araújo
3	(Spain) B. González / (Spain) C. Fernández
Bye
9	(Argentina) A. Osoro / (Spain) V. Iglesias	7	6
12	(Spain) J. Castelló / (Spain) L. Rufo	6	3
15	(Spain) A. Martinez / (Italy) C. Orsi	6	6	1
11	(Spain) L. Sainz / (Spain) R. Barrera	7	1	6
16	(Portugal) A. Nogueira / (Argentina) V. Riera	4	1
5	(Spain) M. Ortega / (Spain) T. Icardo	6	6
7	(Spain) A. Salazar / (Spain) M. Calvo	6	6	6
14	(Spain) M. Barrera / (Spain) J. Velasco	7	3	3
Q	(Spain) E. Carnicero / (Spain) P. Martinez	5	6	3
Q	(Sweden) C. Navarro / (Spain) M. Merino	7	4	6
13	(Argentina) M. Goyeneche / (Spain) P. Llaguno	7	6
19	(Argentina) J. Bidahorria / (Spain) L. Arruabarrena	5	3
Bye
2	(Spain) A. Sánchez / (Spain) P. Josemaria

Round of 16
1	(Argentina) D. Brea / (Spain) G. Triay	6	6
10	(Spain) B. Caldera / (Spain) C. Goenaga	4	2
22	(France) A. Collombon / (Spain) J. Cabruja	3	1
8	(Spain) M. Guinart / (Spain) V. Virseda	6	6
6	(Spain) A. Alonso / (Argentina) C. Jensen	6	6
21	(Spain) M.R. Abajo / (Spain) N. Canovas	4	3
18	(Spain) L. Martinez / (Spain) N. Rodriguez	2	4
4	(Spain) A. Ustero / (Portugal) S. Araújo	6	6
3	(Spain) B. González / (Spain) C. Fernández	6	6
9	(Argentina) A. Osoro / (Spain) V. Iglesias	3	2
11	(Spain) L. Sainz / (Spain) R. Barrera	3	4
5	(Spain) M. Ortega / (Spain) T. Icardo	6	6
7	(Spain) A. Salazar / (Spain) M. Calvo	6	6
Q	(Sweden) C. Navarro / (Spain) M. Merino	0	0
13	(Argentina) M. Goyeneche / (Spain) P. Llaguno	3	6
2	(Spain) A. Sánchez / (Spain) P. Josemaria	6	7

Quarter-Final
1	(Argentina) D. Brea / (Spain) G. Triay	6	6
8	(Spain) M. Guinart / (Spain) V. Virseda	0	4
6	(Spain) A. Alonso / (Argentina) C. Jensen	3	4
4	(Spain) A. Ustero / (Portugal) S. Araújo	6	6
3	(Spain) B. González / (Spain) C. Fernández	6	6
5	(Spain) M. Ortega / (Spain) T. Icardo	3	0
7	(Spain) A. Salazar / (Spain) M. Calvo	3	6	5
2	(Spain) A. Sánchez / (Spain) P. Josemaria	6	3	7

Semi-Finals
1	(Argentina) D. Brea / (Spain) G. Triay	6	6
4	(Spain) A. Ustero / (Portugal) S. Araújo	1	2
3	(Spain) B. González / (Spain) C. Fernández	4	7	6
2	(Spain) A. Sánchez / (Spain) P. Josemaria	6	6	3

Finals
1	(Argentina) D. Brea / (Spain) G. Triay	1	5
3	(Spain) B. González / (Spain) C. Fernández	6	7

== Results ==
=== First Round ===
Men's

Date	Winners	Score	Opponent	Refs.
11/11/2025	(Spain) Francisco Jurado (Spain) Sergio Icardo	7–6 / 6–4	(Spain) Anton Sans Riola (Spain) Marc Quilez	
11/11/2025	(Argentina) Federico Mouriño (Argentina) Ramiro Valenzuela	7–6 / 6–3	(Spain) Jose García Diestro (Spain) Victor Ruiz	
11/11/2025	(Spain) Mario Huete Hernandez (Spain) Mario Ortega	6–4 / 6–4	(Italy) Facundo Dominguez (Spain) Javier Martinez Vazquez	
11/11/2025	(Argentina) Agustín Gutiérez (Chile) Javier Valdes	6–1 / 6–0	(United Arab Emirates) Fares Al Janahi (United Arab Emirates) Majed Al Janahi	
11/11/2025	(Italy) Denis Perino (Argentina) Ignacio Piotto	4–6 / 6–3 / 6–4	(Spain) Alvaro Melendez Amaya (Spain) Pedro Melendez Amaya	
11/11/2025	(Spain) Andres Fernandez Lancha (Spain) Ignacio Sager	7–6 / 7–5	(Spain) Adrian Ronco Lopez (Argentina) Julian Lacamoire	
11/11/2025	(Argentina) Maximiliano Arce (Spain) Pablo Lijó	6–4 / 6–2	(Spain) Albert Roglan Pons (Spain) Ferran Insa	
11/11/2025	(Spain) Francisco Gil Morales (Argentina) Maxi Sánchez	6–3 / 6–4	(Spain) Diego García (Spain) Salvador Oria	
11/11/2025	(Spain) Jose Jimenez Casas (Argentina) Maxi Sanchez Blasco	4–6 / 6–3 / 6–4	(Italy) Flavio Abbate (Spain) Manuel Castaño	
11/11/2025	(Italy) Alvaro Montiel (Argentina) Juan Cruz Belluati	6–4 / 6–4	(Spain) Daniel Santigosa (Spain) Marc Sintes	
11/11/2025	(Spain) David Gala Sánchez (Spain) Pablo García Rodrigo	3–6 / 6–3 / 7–6	(Spain) Alvaro Cepero (Argentina) Eduardo Agustin Torre	
11/11/2025	(Spain) Enrique Goenaga (Spain) Luis Hernandez Quesada	6–3 / 6–3	(Spain) Ignacio Vilariño (Spain) Javier Rico	
11/11/2025	(Portugal) Miguel Deus (Portugal) Nuno Deus	6–3 / 7–6	(Spain) Alejandro Jerez (Argentina) Miguel Lamperti	
11/11/2025	(Spain) Emilio Sanchez Chamero (Italy) Enzo Jensen	7–5 / 6–4	(Spain) Gonzalo Rubio (Spain) Javi Ruiz	
11/11/2025	(Spain) Guillermo Collado (Spain) Pol Hernandez	6–3 / 6–4	(Spain) Francisco Cabeza (Spain) Teodoro Zapata	
11/11/2025	(Spain) Aimar Goñi (Argentina) Lucho Capra	6–0 / 6–2	(Spain) Mario Del Castillo (Spain) Pincho Fernandez	

=== Round of 32 ===
Men's

Date	Winners	Score	Opponent	Refs.
12/11/2025	(Argentina) Agustín Tapia (Spain) Arturo Coello	6–1 / 6–1	(Spain) Francisco Jurado (Spain) Sergio Icardo	
12/11/2025	(Argentina) Alex Chozas (Argentina) Leonel Aguirre	6–4 / 6–1	(Argentina) Federico Mouriño (Argentina) Ramiro Valenzuela	
12/11/2025	(Spain) Alex Arroyo (United Arab Emirates) Iñigo Jofre	6–4 / 6–2	(Spain) Mario Huete Hernandez (Spain) Mario Ortega	
12/11/2025	(Spain) Javi Leal (Brazil) Lucas Bergamini	6–3 / 6–3	(Argentina) Agustín Gutiérez (Chile) Javier Valdes	
12/11/2025	(Spain) Francisco Guerrero (Spain) Momo Gonzalez	6–1 / 6–1	(Italy) Denis Perino (Argentina) Ignacio Piotto	
12/11/2025	(Spain) Andres Fernandez Lancha (Spain) Ignacio Sager	7–6 / 6–4	(Argentina) Gonzalo Alfonso (Argentina) Sanyo Gutiérrez	
12/11/2025	(Spain) Javi Garrido (Brazil) Lucas Campagnolo	6–4 / 6–4	(Argentina) Maximiliano Arce (Spain) Pablo Lijó	
12/11/2025	(Spain) Coki Nieto (Spain) Mike Yanguas	7–5 / 6–4	(Spain) Francisco Gil Morales (Argentina) Maxi Sánchez	
12/11/2025	(Argentina) Franco Stupaczuk (Spain) Juan Lebrón	6–1 / 6–1	(Spain) Jose Jimenez Casas (Argentina) Maxi Sanchez Blasco	
12/11/2025	(Spain) Jairo Bautista (Argentina) Valentino Libaak	6–4 / 6–1	(Italy) Alvaro Montiel (Argentina) Juan Cruz Belluati	
12/11/2025	(Spain) Aléx Ruiz (Spain) Juanlu Esbri	7–6 / 6–2	(Spain) David Gala Sánchez (Spain) Pablo García Rodrigo	
12/11/2025	(Argentina) Leandro Augsburger (Argentina) Martin Di Nenno	7–6 / 6–4	(Spain) Enrique Goenaga (Spain) Luis Hernandez Quesada	
12/11/2025	(Spain) Jon Sanz (Spain) Paquito Navarro	7–6 / 7–6	(Portugal) Miguel Deus (Portugal) Nuno Deus	
12/11/2025	(Spain) Eduardo Alonso (Argentina) Juan Tello	6–3 / 3–6 / 6–3	(Spain) Emilio Sanchez Chamero (Italy) Enzo Jensen	
12/11/2025	(Spain) Javier Barahona (Spain) Javier García Mora	6–1 / 6–1	(Spain) Guillermo Collado (Spain) Pol Hernandez	
12/11/2025	(Spain) Alejandro Galán (Argentina) Federico Chingotto	5–7 / 6–4 / 6–1	(Spain) Aimar Goñi (Argentina) Lucho Capra	

Women's

Date	Winners	Score	Opponent	Refs.
12/11/2025	(Spain) Beatriz Caldera (Spain) Carmen Goenaga	7–6 / 7–6	(Spain) Marta Talavan (Spain) Sofía Saiz Vallejo	
11/11/2025	(France) Alix Collombon (Spain) Jana Montes Cabruja	7–5 / 2–6 / 6–4	(Russia) Ksenia Sharifova (Spain) Marina Martinez Lobo	
11/11/2025	(Spain) Marina Guinart (Spain) Verónica Virseda	6–1 / 6–2	(Spain) Agueda Perez (Spain) Marta Caparros	
12/11/2025	(Spain) Alejandra Alonso (Argentina) Claudia Jensen	6–4 / 6–4	(Italy) Giorgia Marchetti (France) Lea Godallier	
12/11/2025	(Spain) Laia Rodriguez Abajo (Spain) Noa Canovas	6–7 / 6–4 / 6–2	(Spain) Laura Lujan Rodriguez (Spain) Letizia Manquillo	
11/11/2025	(Spain) Lucia Martinez Gomez (Spain) Nuria Rodriguez	6–2 / 6–2	(Spain) Ariadna Cañellas (Italy) Carlotta Casali	
11/11/2025	(Argentina) Aranzazu Osoro (Spain) Victoria Iglesias	7–6 / 6–3	(Spain) Jessica Castelló (Spain) Lorena Rufo	
11/11/2025	(Spain) Lucia Sainz (Spain) Raquel Eugenio Barrera	7–6 / 1–6 / 6–1	(Spain) Araceli Martinez (Italy) Carolina Orsi	
12/11/2025	(Spain) Marta Ortega (Spain) Tamara Icardo	6–4 / 6–1	(Portugal) Ana Catarina Nogueira (Argentina) Virginia Riera	
12/11/2025	(Spain) Alejandra Salazar (Spain) Martina Calvo	6–7 / 6–3 / 6–3	(Spain) Jimena Velasco (Spain) Marta Barrera	
12/11/2025	(Sweden) Carolina Navarro Björk (Spain) Melania Merino	7–5 / 4–6 / 6–3	(Spain) Esther Carnicero (Spain) Patricia Martinez Fortun	
11/11/2025	(Argentina) Martina Fassio Goyeneche (Spain) Patricia Llaguno	7–5 / 6–3	(Argentina) Julieta Bidahorria (Spain) Lara Arruabarrena	

=== Round of 16 ===
Men's

Date	Winners	Score	Opponent	Refs.
13/11/2025	(Argentina) Agustín Tapia (Spain) Arturo Coello	7–5 / 6–3	(Argentina) Alex Chozas (Argentina) Leonel Aguirre	
13/11/2025	(Spain) Javi Leal (Brazil) Lucas Bergamini	6–1 / 6–4	(Spain) Alex Arroyo (United Arab Emirates) Iñigo Jofre	
13/11/2025	(Spain) Francisco Guerrero (Spain) Momo Gonzalez	6–4 / 6–1	(Spain) Andres Fernandez Lancha (Spain) Ignacio Sager	
13/11/2025	(Spain) Javi Garrido (Brazil) Lucas Campagnolo	3–6 / 6–4 / 6–4	(Spain) Coki Nieto (Spain) Mike Yanguas	
13/11/2025	(Argentina) Franco Stupaczuk (Spain) Juan Lebrón	7–6 / 7–6	(Spain) Jairo Bautista (Argentina) Valentino Libaak	
13/11/2025	(Argentina) Leandro Augsburger (Argentina) Martin Di Nenno	4–6 / 7–6 / 6–0	(Spain) Aléx Ruiz (Spain) Juanlu Esbri	
13/11/2025	(Spain) Eduardo Alonso (Argentina) Juan Tello	6–2 / 3–6 / 7–6	(Spain) Jon Sanz (Spain) Paquito Navarro	
13/11/2025	(Spain) Alejandro Galán (Argentina) Federico Chingotto	6–3 / 6–1	(Spain) Javier Barahona (Spain) Javier García Mora	

Women's

Date	Winners	Score	Opponent	Refs.
13/11/2025	(Argentina) Delfina Brea (Spain) Gemma Triay	6–4 / 6–2	(Spain) Beatriz Caldera (Spain) Carmen Goenaga	
13/11/2025	(Spain) Marina Guinart (Spain) Verónica Virseda	6–3 / 6–1	(France) Alix Collombon (Spain) Jana Montes Cabruja	
13/11/2025	(Spain) Alejandra Alonso (Argentina) Claudia Jensen	6–4 / 6–3	(Spain) Laia Rodriguez Abajo (Spain) Noa Canovas	
13/11/2025	(Spain) Andrea Ustero (Portugal) Sofia Araújo	6–2 / 6–4	(Spain) Lucia Martinez Gomez (Spain) Nuria Rodriguez	
13/11/2025	(Spain) Bea González (Spain) Claudia Fernandéz	6–3 / 6–2	(Argentina) Aranzazu Osoro (Spain) Victoria Iglesias	
13/11/2025	(Spain) Marta Ortega (Spain) Tamara Icardo	6–3 / 6–4	(Spain) Lucia Sainz (Spain) Raquel Eugenio Barrera	
13/11/2025	(Spain) Alejandra Salazar (Spain) Martina Calvo	6–0 / 6–0	(Sweden) Carolina Navarro Björk (Spain) Melania Merino	
13/11/2025	(Spain) Ariana Sánchez (Spain) Paula Josemaría	6–3 / 7–6	(Argentina) Martina Fassio Goyeneche (Spain) Patricia Llaguno	

=== Quarter-Finals ===
Men's

Date	Winners	Score	Opponent	Refs.
14/11/2025	(Argentina) Agustín Tapia (Spain) Arturo Coello	6–1 / 6–2	(Spain) Javi Leal (Brazil) Lucas Bergamini	
14/11/2025	(Spain) Javi Garrido (Brazil) Lucas Campagnolo	6–4 / 6–7 / 6–4	(Spain) Francisco Guerrero (Spain) Momo Gonzalez	
14/11/2025	(Argentina) Franco Stupaczuk (Spain) Juan Lebrón	4–6 / 6–3 / 7–6	(Argentina) Leandro Augsburger (Argentina) Martin Di Nenno	
14/11/2025	(Spain) Alejandro Galán (Argentina) Federico Chingotto	7–6 / 6–4	(Spain) Eduardo Alonso (Argentina) Juan Tello	

Women's

Date	Winners	Score	Opponent	Refs.
14/11/2025	(Argentina) Delfina Brea (Spain) Gemma Triay	6–0 / 6–4	(Spain) Marina Guinart (Spain) Verónica Virseda	
14/11/2025	(Spain) Andrea Ustero (Portugal) Sofia Araújo	6–3 / 6–4	(Spain) Alejandra Alonso (Argentina) Claudia Jensen	
14/11/2025	(Spain) Bea González (Spain) Claudia Fernandéz	6–3 / 6–0	(Spain) Marta Ortega (Spain) Tamara Icardo	
14/11/2025	(Spain) Ariana Sánchez (Spain) Paula Josemaría	6–3 / 3–6 / 7–5	(Spain) Alejandra Salazar (Spain) Martina Calvo	

=== Semi-Finals ===
Men's

Date	Winners	Score	Opponent	Refs.
15/11/2025	(Argentina) Agustín Tapia (Spain) Arturo Coello	6–4 / 7–6	(Spain) Javi Garrido (Brazil) Lucas Campagnolo	
15/11/2025	(Spain) Alejandro Galán (Argentina) Federico Chingotto	6–1 / 7–6	(Argentina) Franco Stupaczuk (Spain) Juan Lebrón	

Women's

Date	Winners	Score	Opponent	Refs.
15/11/2025	(Argentina) Delfina Brea (Spain) Gemma Triay	6–1 / 6–2	(Spain) Andrea Ustero (Portugal) Sofia Araújo	
15/11/2025	(Spain) Bea González (Spain) Claudia Fernandéz	4–6 / 7–6 / 6–3	(Spain) Ariana Sánchez (Spain) Paula Josemaría	

=== Finals ===
Men's

Date	Winners	Score	Opponent	Refs.
16/11/2025	(Argentina) Agustín Tapia (Spain) Arturo Coello	6–3 / 6–4	(Spain) Alejandro Galán (Argentina) Federico Chingotto	

Women's

Date	Winners	Score	Opponent	Refs.
16/11/2025	(Spain) Bea González (Spain) Claudia Fernandéz	6–1 / 7–5	(Argentina) Delfina Brea (Spain) Gemma Triay	
