= 2026 Milan P1 =

Padel tournament held in Milan, Italy

- Date: 10 – 18 October
- Edition: 5th
- Category: P1
- Prize money: €479.068
- Location: Milan, Italy
- Venue: Allianz Cloud
- Court speed: Fast

Champions
- Men's doubles: (Argentina) Agustín Tapia (Spain) Arturo Coello
- Women's doubles: (Spain) Andrea Ustero (Spain) Ariana Sánchez

Chronology

The 2026 Milan P1 (officially 2026 Premier Padel Oysho Milan P1) is the twentieth tournament of the fifth season organized by Premier Padel, the premier padel circuit, promoted by the International Padel Federation, and with the financial backing of Nasser Al-Khelaïfi's Qatar Sports Investments.

In the women's category, for the third time this season, the second and third-ranked pairs in the FIP rankings reached the finals, having previously faced each other in Valladolid and Rotterdam, with one victory for each side. In the battle for the title, Andrea Ustero and Ariana Sánchez defeated Bea González and Paula Josemaría in straight sets, securing their fifth title of the season (and their third win in four finals over the last four tournaments). The win marked Sánchez and Ustero first title together as a team in Milan, and the second for Ariana individually, as she successfully defended the title she won in 2025.

In the men's category, Juan Lebrón and Leandro Augsburger continued the trend of a pair ranked outside the top two reaching the final, having eliminated Alejandro Galán and Federico Chingotto in the semifinals, marking the first time that Chingotto and Galán have gone three consecutive tournaments without reaching a final. In the decisive match, Agustín Tapia and Arturo Coello, who were competing in their 17th final out of 19 tournaments, defeated Augsburger and Lebrón in three sets. This victory secured their fourth consecutive title (and their twelfth of 2026), crowned them champions in Milan for the second time, and extended their lead in the race for the world number one ranking.

== Relevant data ==
=== Coki Nieto out of Milan P1 ===
After missing the Germany P2 due to injury, Coki Nieto would also be unable to compete in the Milan P1. His participation in the Kuwait Major is also in doubt, with the focus now on the World Championship in Qatar (November 2–7).

=== Yanguas has a new partner for Milan ===
Coki Nieto's withdrawal forced Mike Yanguas to act quickly to find a temporary replacement, and he selected spaniard Pablo Lijó. They entered the tournament as the No. 7 seeds, thanks to the "Individual Lucky Loser" rule.

=== Stupaczuk reinvents himself and try to enter the "Club of Ten" ===
Having won his first title at the 2015 Barcelona Challenger alongside Martín Di Nenno, Franco Stupaczuk, who has been part of the padel elite for ten seasons (since 2017, and almost consistently within the top 4 pairs), is aiming to win a title during the remainder of 2026 to join the elite group of players who have achieved the feat of winning at least at title per year for ten consecutive years. This accomplishment places him alongside renowned names such as Fernando Belasteguín (winning titles from 1996–2022), Juan Martín Díaz (1994–2015), Pablo Lima (2009–2022), Sanyo Gutiérrez (2011–2022), and Paquito Navarro (2014–2023), all of whom are former world number ones.

=== Padel, just like the NBA and the NFL ===
Following the tradition of awarding champions in American sports, the winners of the men's and women's competitions at the Milan P1 will be awarded rings.

=== Coello reaches 300 wins ===
With the victory by the world number 1s, who defeated Franco Stupaczuk and Jon Sanz for the third consecutive tournament, Arturo Coello became the first player to reach the three hundred matches won in Premier Padel.

=== Ariana ties Salazar record of finals reached ===
With her victory over the world No. 1s, Delfina Brea and Gemma Triay, in the semifinals, Ariana Sánchez has matched Alejandra Salazar record, with both having now reached 101 finals. Meanwhile, on the other side of the bracket, Bea González has reached her 50th final.

== Seeds ==
Male
Rnk.	Team	FIP Ranking Points
1	(Argentina) Agustín Tapia (Spain) Arturo Coello	39822
2	(Spain) Alejandro Galán (Argentina) Federico Chingotto	35446
3	(Spain) Juan Lebrón (Argentina) Leandro Augsburguer	15103
4	(Argentina) Franco Stupaczuk (Spain) Jon Sanz	11513
5	(Argentina) Martín Di Nenno (Spain) Paquito Navarro	11179
6	(Spain) Francisco Guerrero (Spain) Javi Leal	8522
7	(Brazil) Lucas Campagnolo (Spain) Momo González	8089
8	(Spain) Mike Yanguas (Spain) Pablo Lijó	6907
9	(Argentina) Juan Tello (Argentina) Maximiliano Arce	5505
10	(Spain) Aimar Goñi (Spain) Eduardo Alonso	5233
11	(Spain) Jairo Bautista (Brazil) Lucas Bergamini	5222
12	(United Arab Emirates) Inigo Jofre (Spain) Juanlu Esbri	5011
12	(Spain) Alejandro Ruiz (Spain) Javier Garcia Mora	4967
14	(Spain) Alejandro Arroyo (Spain) Jose Jimenez Casas	4619
15	(Argentina) Gonzalo Alfonso (Argentina) Valentino Libaak	4382
16	(Spain) Javi Garrido (Argentina) Juan De Pascual	4259

Female
Rnk.	Team	FIP Ranking Points
1	(Argentina) Delfina Brea (Spain) Gemma Triay	31902
2	(Spain) Bea González (Spain) Paula Josemaria	27529
3	(Spain) Ariana Sánchez (Spain) Andrea Ustero	24514
4	(Spain) Claudia Fernandéz (Spain) Martina Calvo	19147
5	(Spain) Marta Ortega (Portugal) Sofia Araújo	11736
6	(Argentina) Claudia Jensen (Spain) Tamara Icardo	10361
7	(Spain) Alejandra Alonso (Spain) Marina Guinart	8622
8	(Spain) Alejandra Salazar (Argentina) Aranzazu Osoro	7582
9	(Argentina) Martina Fassio Goyeneche (Spain) Veronica Virseda	6447
10	(Spain) Beatriz Caldera (Spain) Noa Canovas	5154
11	(Spain) Lorena Rufo (Spain) Victoria Iglesias	4937
12	(Italy) Giulia Dal Pozzo (Spain) Nuria Rodriguez	4911
13	(Spain) Jimena Velasco (Spain) Raquel Barrera	4847
14	(Italy) Carolina Orsi (Spain) Patricia Llaguno	4819
15	(Spain) Jana Montes (Spain) Marta Barrera	4066
16	(Spain) Jessica Castelló (Spain) Maria Rodriguez Abajo	4042

== Head-to-head record between teams ranked in the top 4 during the season ==
=== Men's ===
Record	Coello–Tapia	Galán–Chingotto	Augsburger–Lebrón	Sanz–Stupaczuk	Former Pairs	Di Nenno–Paquito	Stupaczuk–Yanguas
Coello–Tapia	—	7–4	9–1	3–0		2–0	5–0
Galán–Chingotto	4–7	—	4–3	0–2		3–0	3–0
Augsburger–Lebrón	1–9	3–4	—	—		0–1	—
Sanz–Stupaczuk	0–3	2–0	—	—		1–1	—
Former Pairs							
Di Nenno–Paquito	0–2	0–3	1–0	1–1		—	1–2
Stupaczuk–Yanguas	0–5	0–3	—	—		2–1	—

=== Women's ===
Record	D. Brea–Triay	B. González–Paula	Ariana–Ustero	C. Fernández–M. Calvo	Former Pairs	Araúijo–C. Fernández
D. Brea–Triay	—	3–5	6–6	1–2		3–0
B. González–Paula	5–3	—	4–5	3–3		2–0
Ariana–Ustero	6–6	5–4	—	1–1		1–0
C. Fernández–M. Calvo	2–1	3–3	1–1	—		—
Former Pairs
Araúijo–C. Fernández	0–3	0–2	0–1	—		—

== Draws ==
=== Men's bracket ===
Round of 32
1	(Spain) Coello / (Argentina) Tapia	6	6
Q	(United Arab Emirates) A. Ayats / (Spain) E. Chamero	3	3
27	(Spain) F. Cabeza / (Paraguay) M. San Martin	4	6	5
14	(Spain) A. Arroyo / (Spain) J.J. Casas	6	3	7
12	(United Arab Emirates) I. Jofre / (Spain) J. Esbri	3	3
24	(Spain) J.G. Diestro / (Spain) M. Sintes	6	6
34	(Spain) Á. Cepero / (Spain) A.F. Lancha	3	2
6	(Spain) F. Guerrero / (Spain) J. Leal	6	6
7	(Brazil) L. Campagnolo / (Spain) Momo	4	6	6
20	(Argentina) I. Piotto / (Spain) J. Barahona	6	3	2
22	(Spain) M. Castaño / (Spain) P.H. Alvarez	4	3
11	(Spain) J. Bautista / (Brazil) L. Bergamini	6	6
13	(Spain) A. Ruiz / (Spain) J.G. Mora	4	6	6
17	(Argentina) M. Blasco / (Argentina) Sanyo	6	4	2
Q	(Spain) J. Marmolejo / (Argentina) R. Pereyra	3	2
4	(Argentina) F. Stupaczuk / (Spain) J. Sanz
3	(Spain) Lebrón / (Argentina) L. Augsburger	7	6
29	(Argentina) F. Mourino / (Spain) M. Quilez	6	1
37	(Belgium) C. Geens / (France) D. Guichard	5	6
10	(Spain) A. Goñi / (Spain) E. Alonso	7	7
16	(Spain) J. Garrido / (Argentina) J. De Pascual	6	6
Q	(Argentina) L. Capra / (Argentina) Maxi	3	1
19	(Spain) D.G. Sánchez / (Italy) E. Sirvent	3	3
5	(Argentina) Di Nenno / (Spain) Paquito	6	6
8	(Spain) M. Yanguas / (Spain) P. Lijó	7	6
32	(Spain) J. Ruiz / (Spain) J.L. Gonzalez	6	2
18	(Argentina) L. Aguirre / (Spain) P.G. Rodrigo	2	3
15	(Argentina) G. Alfonso / (Argentina) V. Libaak	6	6
9	(Argentina) J. Tello / (Argentina) M. Arce	6	3	6
35	(Spain) F. Gil / (Argentina) R. Valenzuela	2	6	7
30	(Portugal) M. Deus / (Portugal) Nuno Deus	1	2
2	(Argentina) Chingotto / (Spain) Galán	6	6

Round of 16
1	(Spain) Coello / (Argentina) Tapia	6	6
14	(Spain) A. Arroyo / (Spain) J.J. Casas	2	2
24	(Spain) J.G. Diestro / (Spain) M. Sintes	3	4
6	(Spain) F. Guerrero / (Spain) J. Leal
7	(Brazil) L. Campagnolo / (Spain) Momo	6	1	6
11	(Spain) J. Bautista / (Brazil) L. Bergamini	3	6	3
13	(Spain) A. Ruiz / (Spain) J.G. Mora	2	2
4	(Argentina) F. Stupaczuk / (Spain) J. Sanz	6	6
3	(Spain) Lebrón / (Argentina) L. Augsburger	6	6
10	(Spain) A. Goñi / (Spain) E. Alonso	4	2
16	(Spain) J. Garrido / (Argentina) J. De Pascual
5	(Argentina) Di Nenno / (Spain) Paquito	2	3
8	(Spain) M. Yanguas / (Spain) P. Lijó	1	6
15	(Argentina) G. Alfonso / (Argentina) V. Libaak	6	7
35	(Spain) F. Gil / (Argentina) R. Valenzuela	1	1
2	(Argentina) Chingotto / (Spain) Galán	6	6

Quarter-Final
1	(Spain) Coello / (Argentina) Tapia	6	6
6	(Spain) F. Guerrero / (Spain) J. Leal	2	2
7	(Brazil) L. Campagnolo / (Spain) Momo	3	4
4	(Argentina) F. Stupaczuk / (Spain) J. Sanz
3	(Spain) Lebrón / (Argentina) L. Augsburger	7	6
16	(Spain) J. Garrido / (Argentina) J. De Pascual	6	3
15	(Argentina) G. Alfonso / (Argentina) V. Libaak	3	6
2	(Argentina) Chingotto / (Spain) Galán	6	7

Semi-Finals
1	(Spain) Coello / (Argentina) Tapia	6	6
4	(Argentina) F. Stupaczuk / (Spain) J. Sanz	4	3
3	(Spain) Lebrón / (Argentina) L. Augsburger	0	6	6
2	(Argentina) Chingotto / (Spain) Galán	6	2	2

Finals
1	(Spain) Coello / (Argentina) Tapia	4	6	6
3	(Spain) Lebrón / (Argentina) L. Augsburger	6	3	2

=== Women's bracket ===
Round of 32
1	(Argentina) D. Brea / (Spain) G. Triay
Bye
23	(Argentina) D. Valenzuela / (France) L. Godallier	2	2
10	(Spain) B. Caldera / (Spain) N. Canovas	6	6
14	(Italy) C. Orsi / (Spain) P. Llaguno	4	6	6
19	(Spain) M. Talavan / (Spain) S. Saiz	6	3	2
13	(Spain) J. Velasco / (Spain) R. Barrera	4	6	7
7	(Spain) A. Alonso / (Spain) M. Guinart	6	4	5
8	(Spain) A. Salazar / (Argentina) A. Osoro	6	6
20	(France) A. Collombon / (Russia) K. Sharifova	0	3
12	(Italy) G. Dal Pozzo / (Spain) N. Rodriguez	6	6
WC	(Italy) G. Marchetti / (Spain) L. Arruabarrena	3	0
Q	(Spain) C. Escacena / (Spain) N. Aguilar	6	4	2
18	(Spain) A. Martinez / (Spain) L. Martinez	0	6	6
Bye
3	(Spain) A. Ustero / (Spain) A. Sánchez
4	(Spain) C. Fernández / (Spain) M. Calvo
Bye
22	(Argentina) J. Bidahorria / (Argentina) V. Riera	2	4
16	(Spain) J. Castelló / (Spain) M.R. Abajo	6	6
Q	(Spain) M. Borrero / (Spain) T. Navarro	6	6
Q	(Spain) M. Lobo / (Spain) M. Arellano	2	4
15	(Spain) J. Montes / (Spain) M. Barrera	0	2
5	(Spain) M. Ortega / (Portugal) S. Araújo	6	6
6	(Argentina) C. Jensen / (Spain) T. Icardo	6	6
Q	(Spain) A. Moral / (Spain) C. Goyeneche	4	1
9	(Argentina) M. Goyeneche / (Spain) V. Virseda	6	4	6
21	(Spain) A. Perez / (Spain) M. Caparros	4	6	2
17	(Spain) L. Manquillo / (Spain) L. Sainz	1	6	4
11	(Spain) L. Rufo / (Spain) V. Iglesias	6	3	6
Bye
2	(Spain) B. González / (Spain) P. Josemaria

Round of 16
1	(Argentina) D. Brea / (Spain) G. Triay	6	6
10	(Spain) B. Caldera / (Spain) N. Canovas	0	3
14	(Italy) C. Orsi / (Spain) P. Llaguno	3	5
13	(Spain) J. Velasco / (Spain) R. Barrera	6	7
8	(Spain) A. Salazar / (Argentina) A. Osoro	6	6
12	(Italy) G. Dal Pozzo / (Spain) N. Rodriguez	4	2
18	(Spain) A. Martinez / (Spain) L. Martinez	3	2
3	(Spain) A. Ustero / (Spain) A. Sánchez	6	6
4	(Spain) C. Fernández / (Spain) M. Calvo	6	6
16	(Spain) J. Castelló / (Spain) M.R. Abajo	3	2
Q	(Spain) M. Borrero / (Spain) T. Navarro
5	(Spain) M. Ortega / (Portugal) S. Araújo	*
6	(Argentina) C. Jensen / (Spain) T. Icardo	7	6
9	(Argentina) M. Goyeneche / (Spain) V. Virseda	6	1
11	(Spain) L. Rufo / (Spain) V. Iglesias	7	3	2
2	(Spain) B. González / (Spain) P. Josemaria	6	6	6

Quarter-Final
1	(Argentina) D. Brea / (Spain) G. Triay	6	7
13	(Spain) J. Velasco / (Spain) R. Barrera	2	6
8	(Spain) A. Salazar / (Argentina) A. Osoro	4	3
3	(Spain) A. Ustero / (Spain) A. Sánchez	6	6
4	(Spain) C. Fernández / (Spain) M. Calvo
5	(Spain) M. Ortega / (Portugal) S. Araújo	1	2
6	(Argentina) C. Jensen / (Spain) T. Icardo	1
2	(Spain) B. González / (Spain) P. Josemaria	6	*

Semi-Finals
1	(Argentina) D. Brea / (Spain) G. Triay	1	4
3	(Spain) A. Ustero / (Spain) A. Sánchez	6	6
4	(Spain) C. Fernández / (Spain) M. Calvo	2	6
2	(Spain) B. González / (Spain) P. Josemaria	6	7

Finals
3	(Spain) A. Ustero / (Spain) A. Sánchez	7	6
2	(Spain) B. González / (Spain) P. Josemaria	6	3

== Results ==
=== First round ===
Men's
Date	Winners	Score	Opponent	Ref.
12/10/2026	(United Arab Emirates) Arnau Ayats (Spain) Emilio Sánchez Chamero	7–5 / 7–5	(Italy) Aris Patiniotis (Spain) Diego Garcia Garcia	
12/10/2026	(Spain) Francisco Cabeza (Paraguay) Mariano San Martin	6–3 / 4–6 / 6–3	(Spain) Álvaro Mélendez Amaya (Spain) Gonzalo Rubio	
12/10/2026	(Spain) Jose Garcia Diestro (Spain) Marc Sintes	6–4 / 6–3	(Spain) Enrique Goenaga (Spain) Guillermo Collado	
12/10/2026	(Spain) Álvaro Cepero (Spain) Andres Fernández Lancha	5–7 / 6–3 / 7–6	(Sweden) Adam Axelsson (Spain) Mario Ortega	
12/10/2026	(Argentina) Ignacio Piotto (Spain) Javier Barahona	6–7 / 6–3 / 6–2	(Argentina) Fabian Berazategui (Italy) Marco Cassetta	
12/10/2026	(Spain) Manuel Castaño (Spain) Pol Hernandez Alvarez	6–4 / 7–6	(Italy) Alvaro Montiel (Spain) Daniel Santigosa	
12/10/2026	(Argentina) Maxi Sánchez Blasco (Argentina) Sanyo Gutiérrez	6–3 / 4–6 / 6–2	(United Arab Emirates) Ignacio Vilariño (Spain) Juan Zamora	
12/10/2026	(Spain) Jose Solano Marmolejo (Argentina) Ramiro Pereyra	6–2 / 6–3	(Italy) Denis Perino (Italy) Facundo Dominguez	
12/10/2026	(Argentina) Federico Mouriño (Spain) Marc Quilez	5–7 / 7–5 / 6–1	(Argentina) Alex Chozas (Argentina) Juan Ignacio Rubini	
12/10/2026	(Belgium) Clement Geens (France) Dylan Guichard	6–1 / 6–2	(Spain) Mario Del Castillo (Spain) Pincho Fernandez	
12/10/2026	(Argentina) Lucho Capra (Argentina) Maxi Sánchez	7–6 / 6–4	(Spain) Alonso Rodriguez Martinez (Italy) Flavio Abbate	
12/10/2026	(Spain) David Gala Sánchez (Italy) Enzo Jensen	6–2 / 6–1	(Italy) Giulio Graziotti (Italy) Simone Iacovino	
12/10/2026	(Spain) Jose Luis Gonzalez (Spain) Javier Ruiz	6–4 / 6–7 / 6–3	(Argentina) Franco Dal Bianco (Spain) Jose Pineda Cabello	
12/10/2026	(Argentina) Leonel Aguirre (Spain) Pablo Garcia Rodrigo	6–4 / 6–2	(Spain) Jaume Barcelo (Spain) Marcos Blanco	
12/10/2026	(Spain) Francisco Manuel Gil (Argentina) Ramiro Valenzuela	7–6 / 3–6 / 6–4	(Spain) Albert Roglan Pons (Spain) Manuel Aragon	
12/10/2026	(Portugal) Miguel Deus (Portugal) Nuno Deus	7–6 / 3–6 / 6–4	(Spain) Javier Martinez (Spain) Luis Hernandez Quesada	

=== Round of 32 ===
Men's
Date	Winners	Score	Opponent	Ref.
14/10/2026	(Argentina) Agustín Tapia (Spain) Arturo Coello	6–3 / 6–3	(United Arab Emirates) Arnau Ayats (Spain) Emilio Sánchez Chamero	
14/10/2026	(Spain) Alejandro Arroyo (Spain) Jose Jimenez Casas	6–4 / 3–6 / 7–5	(Spain) Francisco Cabeza (Paraguay) Mariano San Martin	
13/10/2026	(Spain) Jose Garcia Diestro (Spain) Marc Sintes	6–3 / 6–3	(United Arab Emirates) Inigo Jofre (Spain) Juanlu Esbri	
13/10/2026	(Spain) Francisco Guerrero (Spain) Javi Leal	6–3 / 6–2	(Spain) Álvaro Cepero (Spain) Andres Fernández Lancha	
13/10/2026	(Brazil) Lucas Campagnolo (Spain) Momo González	4–6 / 6–3 / 6–2	(Argentina) Ignacio Piotto (Spain) Javier Barahona	
13/10/2026	(Spain) Jairo Bautista (Brazil) Lucas Bergamini	6–4 / 6–3	(Spain) Manuel Castaño (Spain) Pol Hernandez Alvarez	
14/10/2026	(Spain) Alejandro Ruiz (Spain) Javier Garcia Mora	4–6 / 6–4 / 6–2	(Argentina) Maxi Sánchez Blasco (Argentina) Sanyo Gutiérrez	
14/10/2026	(Argentina) Franco Stupaczuk (Spain) Jon Sanz	6–3 / 6–2	(Spain) Jose Solano Marmolejo (Argentina) Ramiro Pereyra	
14/10/2026	(Spain) Juan Lebrón (Argentina) Leandro Augsburger	7–6 / 6–1	(Argentina) Federico Mouriño (Spain) Marc Quilez	
14/10/2026	(Spain) Aimar Goñi (Spain) Eduardo Alonso	7–5 / 7–6	(Belgium) Clement Geens (France) Dylan Guichard	
13/10/2026	(Spain) Javi Garrido (Argentina) Juan De Pascual	6–3 / 6–1	(Argentina) Lucho Capra (Argentina) Maxi Sánchez	
13/10/2026	(Argentina) Martin Di Nenno (Spain) Paquito Navarro	6–3 / 6–3	(Spain) David Gala Sánchez (Italy) Enzo Jensen	
13/10/2026	(Spain) Mike Yanguas (Spain) Pablo Lijó	7–6 / 6–2	(Spain) Jose Luis Gonzalez (Spain) Javier Ruiz	
13/10/2026	(Argentina) Gonzalo Alfonso (Argentina) Valentino Libaak	6–2 / 6–3	(Argentina) Leonel Aguirre (Spain) Pablo Garcia Rodrigo	
14/10/2026	(Spain) Francisco Manuel Gil (Argentina) Ramiro Valenzuela	2–6 / 6–3 / 7–6	(Argentina) Juan Tello (Argentina) Maximiliano Arce	
14/10/2026	(Spain) Alejandro Galán (Argentina) Federico Chingotto	6–1 / 6–2	(Portugal) Miguel Deus (Portugal) Nuno Deus	

Women's
Date	Winners	Score	Opponent	Ref.
13/10/2026	(Spain) Beatriz Caldera (Spain) Noa Canovas	6–2 / 6–2	(Argentina) Daiara Valenzuela (France) Lea Godallier	
13/10/2026	(Italy) Carolina Orsi (Spain) Patricia Llaguno	4–6 / 6–3 / 6–2	(Spain) Marta Talavan (Spain) Sofia Saiz	
13/10/2026	(Spain) Jimena Velasco (Spain) Raquel Barrera	4–6 / 6–4 / 7–5	(Spain) Alejandra Alonso (Spain) Marina Guinart	
13/10/2026	(Spain) Alejandra Salazar (Argentina) Aranzazu Osoro	6–0 / 6–3	(France) Alix Collombon (Russia) Ksenia Sharifova	
13/10/2026	(Italy) Giulia Dal Pozzo (Spain) Nuria Rodriguez	6–0 / 6–3	(Italy) Giorgia Marchetti (Spain) Lara Arruabarrena	
13/10/2026	(Spain) Araceli Martinez (Spain) Lucia Martinez	0–6 / 6–4 / 6–2	(Spain) Claudia Escacena (Spain) Noemi Aguilar	
14/10/2026	(Spain) Jessica Castelló (Spain) Maria Rodriguez Abajo	6–2 / 6–4	(Argentina) Julieta Bidahorria (Argentina) Virginia Riera	
14/10/2026	(Spain) Marta Borrero (Spain) Teresa Navarro	6–2 / 6–4	(Spain) Marta Arellano (Spain) Marina Lobo	
14/10/2026	(Spain) Marta Ortega (Portugal) Sofia Araújo	6–0 / 6–2	(Spain) Jana Montes (Spain) Marta Barrera	
14/10/2026	(Argentina) Claudia Jensen (Spain) Tamara Icardo	6–4 / 6–1	(Spain) Amanda Lopez Moral (Spain) Camila Fassio Goyeneche	
14/10/2026	(Argentina) Martina Fassio Goyeneche (Spain) Veronica Virseda	6–4 / 4–6 / 6–2	(Spain) Agueda Perez (Spain) Marta Caparros	
14/10/2026	(Spain) Lorena Rufo (Spain) Victoria Iglesias	6–1 / 3–6 / 6–4	(Spain) Letizia Manquillo (Spain) Lucía Sainz	

=== Round of 16 ===
Men's
Date	Winners	Score	Opponent	Ref.
15/10/2026	(Argentina) Agustín Tapia (Spain) Arturo Coello	6–2 / 6–2	(Spain) Alejandro Arroyo (Spain) Jose Jimenez Casas	
15/10/2026	(Spain) Francisco Guerrero (Spain) Javi Leal	6–3 / 6–4	(Spain) Jose Garcia Diestro (Spain) Marc Sintes	
15/10/2026	(Brazil) Lucas Campagnolo (Spain) Momo González	6–3 / 1–6 / 6–3	(Spain) Jairo Bautista (Brazil) Lucas Bergamini	
15/10/2026	(Argentina) Franco Stupaczuk (Spain) Jon Sanz	6–2 / 6–2	(Spain) Alejandro Ruiz (Spain) Javier Garcia Mora	
15/10/2026	(Spain) Juan Lebrón (Argentina) Leandro Augsburger	6–4 / 6–2	(Spain) Aimar Goñi (Spain) Eduardo Alonso	
15/10/2026	(Spain) Javi Garrido (Argentina) Juan De Pascual	6–2 / 6–3	(Argentina) Martin Di Nenno (Spain) Paquito Navarro	
15/10/2026	(Argentina) Gonzalo Alfonso (Argentina) Valentino Libaak	6–1 / 7–6	(Spain) Mike Yanguas (Spain) Pablo Lijó	
15/10/2026	(Spain) Alejandro Galán (Argentina) Federico Chingotto	6–1 / 6–1	(Spain) Francisco Manuel Gil (Argentina) Ramiro Valenzuela	

Women's
Date	Winners	Score	Opponent	Ref.
15/10/2026	(Argentina) Delfina Brea (Spain) Gemma Triay	6–0 / 6–3	(Spain) Beatriz Caldera (Spain) Noa Canovas	
15/10/2026	(Spain) Jimena Velasco (Spain) Raquel Barrera	6–3 / 7–5	(Italy) Carolina Orsi (Spain) Patricia Llaguno	
15/10/2026	(Spain) Alejandra Salazar (Argentina) Aranzazu Osoro	6–4 / 6–2	(Italy) Giulia Dal Pozzo (Spain) Nuria Rodriguez	
15/10/2026	(Spain) Andrea Ustero (Spain) Ariana Sánchez	6–3 / 6–2	(Spain) Araceli Martinez (Spain) Lucia Martinez	
15/10/2026	(Spain) Claudia Fernández (Spain) Martina Calvo	6–3 / 6–2	(Spain) Jessica Castelló (Spain) Maria Rodriguez Abajo	
15/10/2026	(Spain) Marta Ortega (Portugal) Sofia Araújo	W.O.	(Spain) Marta Borrero (Spain) Teresa Navarro	
15/10/2026	(Argentina) Claudia Jensen (Spain) Tamara Icardo	7–6 / 6–1	(Argentina) Martina Fassio Goyeneche (Spain) Veronica Virseda	
15/10/2026	(Spain) Bea González (Spain) Paula Josemaría	6–7 / 6–3 / 6–2	(Spain) Lorena Rufo (Spain) Victoria Iglesias	

=== Quarter-finals ===
Men's
Date	Winners	Score	Opponent	Ref.
16/10/2026	(Argentina) Agustín Tapia (Spain) Arturo Coello	6–2 / 6–2	(Spain) Francisco Guerrero (Spain) Javi Leal	
16/10/2026	(Argentina) Franco Stupaczuk (Spain) Jon Sanz	6–3 / 6–4	(Brazil) Lucas Campagnolo (Spain) Momo González	
16/10/2026	(Spain) Juan Lebrón (Argentina) Leandro Augsburger	7–6 / 6–3	(Spain) Javi Garrido (Argentina) Juan De Pascual	
16/10/2026	(Spain) Alejandro Galán (Argentina) Federico Chingotto	6–3 / 7–6	(Argentina) Gonzalo Alfonso (Argentina) Valentino Libaak	

Women's
Date	Winners	Score	Opponent	Ref.
16/10/2026	(Argentina) Delfina Brea (Spain) Gemma Triay	6–2 / 7–6	(Spain) Jimena Velasco (Spain) Raquel Barrera	
16/10/2026	(Spain) Andrea Ustero (Spain) Ariana Sánchez	6–4 / 6–3	(Spain) Alejandra Salazar (Argentina) Aranzazu Osoro	
16/10/2026	(Spain) Claudia Fernández (Spain) Martina Calvo	6–1 / 6–2	(Spain) Marta Ortega (Portugal) Sofia Araújo	
16/10/2026	(Spain) Bea González (Spain) Paula Josemaría	6–1 / W.O.	(Argentina) Claudia Jensen (Spain) Tamara Icardo	

=== Semi-finals ===
Men's
Date	Winners	Score	Opponent	Ref.
17/10/2026	(Argentina) Agustín Tapia (Spain) Arturo Coello	6–4 / 6–3	(Argentina) Franco Stupaczuk (Spain) Jon Sanz	
17/10/2026	(Spain) Juan Lebrón (Argentina) Leandro Augsburger	0–6 / 6–2 / 6–2	(Spain) Alejandro Galán (Argentina) Federico Chingotto	

Women's
Date	Winners	Score	Opponent	Ref.
17/10/2026	(Spain) Andrea Ustero (Spain) Ariana Sánchez	6–1 / 6–4	(Argentina) Delfina Brea (Spain) Gemma Triay	
17/10/2026	(Spain) Bea González (Spain) Paula Josemaría	6–2 / 7–6	(Spain) Claudia Fernández (Spain) Martina Calvo	

=== Finals ===
Men's
Date	Winners	Score	Opponent	Ref.
18/10/2026	(Argentina) Agustín Tapia (Spain) Arturo Coello	4–6 / 6–3 / 6–2	(Spain) Juan Lebrón (Argentina) Leandro Augsburger	

Women's
Date	Winners	Score	Opponent	Ref.
18/10/2026	(Spain) Andrea Ustero (Spain) Ariana Sánchez	7–6 / 6–3	(Spain) Bea González (Spain) Paula Josemaría	
