= 2026 Kuwait Major =

Padel tournament held in Kuwait

- Date: 23 – 31 October
- Edition: 2nd
- Category: Major (Note: The tournament was originally scheduled to be a P1, but with the cancellation of the Qatar Major and a vacancy opening up, it was upgraded to a Major.)
- Prize money: €1.044.849
- Location: Kuwait, Kuwait
- Venue: The Arena Kuwait
- Court speed: Slow

Champions
- Men's doubles: (Argentina) Agustín Tapia (Spain) Arturo Coello
- Women's doubles: (Argentina) Delfina Brea (Spain) Gemma Triay

Chronology

The 2026 Kuwait Major (officially 2026 Premier Padel Kuwait Major) is the twenty-first tournament of the fifth season organized by Premier Padel, the premier padel circuit, promoted by the International Padel Federation, and with the financial backing of Nasser Al-Khelaïfi's Qatar Sports Investments.

In the women’s category, for the fourth time this season, the first and third ranked pairs in the FIP rankings reached the finals. The third-ranked pair, Andrea Ustero and Ariana Sánchez, made their fifth consecutive final appearance, while the top-ranked pair, Delfina Brea and Gemma Triay, returned to a final after a four-tournament absence. In the championship match, Delfina and Gemma defeated Ariana and Ustero in three sets, securing their seventh title of the season and moving closer to mathematically clinching the year-end world number 1 ranking. With this victory, both players won the Kuwait tournament for the first time, becoming the first to claim the title since the event was elevated to "Major" status.

In the men's category, the absence of Alejandro Galán and Federico Chingotto allowed other pairs to reach the final, with Juan Tello and Maxi Arce taking advantage of this, becoming the fourth pair outside the top 8 (unseeded) in Premier Padel history to reach a final (this had already happened in 2022 at the Milan P1, at the Qatar Major in 2024 and at the Asunción P2 in 2025). Their rivals would be the world number 1s, Agustín Tapia and Arturo Coello, who were playing their fifth consecutive final and their 18th final in 20 tournaments. In the title match, Coello and Tapia defeated Arce and Tello in one of the most one-sided finals in the history of the circuit, securing the pair's fifth consecutive title (and their thirteenth of 2026), and their second in Kuwait (having already won in 2024, this time as a Major).

== Relevant data ==
=== Coello and Tapia retain the world number 1 spot ===
With the tournament victory the "Golden Boys", Agustín Tapia and Arturo Coello, mathematically guaranteed to finish the season as the world number ones. This marks their third consecutive year at the top of the Premier Padel rankings, which combined with their first-place finish on World Padel Tour in 2023, means they will become the first pair since Fernando Belasteguín and Juan Martín Díaz to finish the seasons in world number 1 spot for four consecutive years, as well equal Juan Lebrón as the active players with the most year-end world number ones (with four each).

With this title, Agustín Tapia also equaled Pablo Lima, with both having won 66 titles and becoming the third player with the most titles since the beginning of the Padel Pro Tour era (2006-present).

=== Gemma becomes the new record-holder for titles ===
Beyond its significance in the battle for the top spot in the rankings, the women’s final also carried great historical weight, with both Ariana Sánchez and Gemma Triay having the chance to surpass Alejandra Salazar’s record of 58 titles. With her victory in the final, Gemma became the player with the highest number of professional titles since the beginning of the PPT (Padel Pro Tour) era.

== Seeds ==
Male
Rnk.	Team	FIP Ranking Points
1	(Argentina) Agustín Tapia (Spain) Arturo Coello	40818
2	(Spain) Alejandro Galán (Argentina) Federico Chingotto	33994
3	(Spain) Juan Lebrón (Argentina) Leandro Augsburguer	15737
4	(Argentina) Franco Stupaczuk (Spain) Jon Sanz	12207
5	(Argentina) Martín Di Nenno (Spain) Paquito Navarro	10741
6	(Spain) Coki Nieto (Spain) Mike Yanguas	10043
7	(Spain) Francisco Guerrero (Spain) Javi Leal	8548
8	(Brazil) Lucas Campagnolo (Spain) Momo González	8141
9	(Argentina) Juan Tello (Argentina) Maximiliano Arce	5234
10	(Spain) Jairo Bautista (Brazil) Lucas Bergamini	5203
11	(Spain) Aimar Goñi (Spain) Eduardo Alonso	5137
12	(Argentina) Gonzalo Alfonso (Argentina) Valentino Libaak	4748
13	(United Arab Emirates) Inigo Jofre (Spain) Juanlu Esbri	4679
14	(Spain) Alejandro Ruiz (Spain) Javier Garcia Mora	4603
15	(Spain) Alejandro Arroyo (Spain) Jose Jimenez Casas	4586
16	(Spain) Javi Garrido (Argentina) Juan De Pascual	4426

Female
Rnk.	Team	FIP Ranking Points
1	(Argentina) Delfina Brea (Spain) Gemma Triay	31618
2	(Spain) Bea González (Spain) Paula Josemaria	26991
3	(Spain) Ariana Sánchez (Spain) Andrea Ustero	25596
4	(Spain) Claudia Fernandéz (Spain) Martina Calvo	19833
5	(Spain) Marta Ortega (Portugal) Sofia Araújo	11504
6	(Argentina) Claudia Jensen (Spain) Tamara Icardo	10219
7	(Spain) Alejandra Alonso (Spain) Marina Guinart	8328
8	(Spain) Alejandra Salazar (Argentina) Aranzazu Osoro	7403
9	(Spain) Beatriz Caldera (Spain) Carmen Goenaga	6519
10	(Argentina) Martina Fassio Goyeneche (Spain) Veronica Virseda	6298
11	(Spain) Jimena Velasco (Spain) Raquel Barrera	5053
12	(Italy) Giulia Dal Pozzo (Spain) Nuria Rodriguez	5004
13	(Spain) Lorena Rufo (Spain) Victoria Iglesias	4873
14	(Italy) Carolina Orsi (Spain) Patricia Llaguno	4781
15	(Spain) Jana Montes (Spain) Marta Barrera	3999
16	(Spain) Jessica Castelló (Spain) Maria Rodriguez Abajo	3993

== Head-to-head record between teams ranked in the top 4 during the season ==
=== Men's ===
Record	Coello–Tapia	Galán–Chingotto	Augsburger–Lebrón	Sanz–Stupaczuk	Former Pairs	Di Nenno–Paquito	Stupaczuk–Yanguas
Coello–Tapia	—	7–4	9–1	3–0		2–0	5–0
Galán–Chingotto	4–7	—	4–3	0–2		3–0	3–0
Augsburger–Lebrón	1–9	3–4	—	—		0–1	—
Sanz–Stupaczuk	0–3	2–0	—	—		1–1	—
Former Pairs							
Di Nenno–Paquito	0–2	0–3	1–0	1–1		—	1–2
Stupaczuk–Yanguas	0–5	0–3	—	—		2–1	—

=== Women's ===
Record	D. Brea–Triay	B. González–Paula	Ariana–Ustero	C. Fernández–M. Calvo	Former Pairs	Araújo–C. Fernández
D. Brea–Triay	—	3–5	7–6	2–2		3–0
B. González–Paula	5–3	—	4–6	3–3		2–0
Ariana–Ustero	6–7	6–4	—	1–1		1–0
C. Fernández–M. Calvo	2–2	3–3	1–1	—		—
Former Pairs
Araújo–C. Fernández	0–3	0–2	0–1	—		—

== Draws ==
=== Men's Bracket ===
Round of 32
1	(Spain) Coello / (Argentina) Tapia	6	6
34	(Italy) F. Abbate / (Argentina) F. Dal Bianco	3	0
24	(Spain) E. Goenaga / (Spain) G. Collado	6	7
16	(Spain) J. Garrido / (Argentina) J. De Pascual	2	6
10	(Spain) J. Bautista / (Brazil) L. Bergamini	7	6
40	(Argentina) L. Capra / (Spain) Maxi	6	3
39	(Spain) J. Marmolejo / (Argentina) R. Pereyra	3	6	4
6	(Spain) Coki / (Spain) M. Yanguas	6	3	6
5	(Argentina) Di Nenno / (Spain) Paquito	6	6
27	(Italy) A. Montiel / (Spain) D. Santigosa	2	3
23	(Spain) M. Castaño / (Spain) P.H. Alvarez	6	6
15	(Spain) A. Arroyo / (Spain) J.J. Casas	3	3
12	(Argentina) G. Alfonso / (Argentina) V. Libaak	6	6
Q	(Spain) N. Moragues / (France) T. Fonteny	2	0
Q	(Argentina) J.C. Belluati / (Paraguay) M. Abud	4	3
3	(Spain) Lebrón / (Argentina) L. Augsburger	6	6
4	(Argentina) F. Stupaczuk / (Spain) J. Sanz	6	7
28	(Spain) A.F. Lancha / (Spain) J.G. Diestro	2	6
21	(Argentina) A. Chozas / (Argentina) J. Rubini	5	5
13	(United Arab Emirates) I. Jofre / (Spain) J. Esbri	7	7
11	(Spain) A. Goñi / (Spain) E. Alonso	7	6
26	(Spain) F. Cabeza / (Paraguay) M. San Martin	5	1
32	(Argentina) F. Mourino / (Spain) M. Quilez	1	7	3
7	(Spain) F. Guerrero / (Spain) J. Leal	6	6	6
8	(Brazil) L. Campagnolo / (Spain) Momo	4	6	5
30	(Spain) J. Zamora / (Spain) M. Sintes	6	3	7
29	(Argentina) F. Lopez / (Spain) V. Ruiz	4	3
14	(Spain) A. Ruiz / (Spain) J.G. Mora	6	6
9	(Argentina) J. Tello / (Argentina) M. Arce	6	4	6
Q	(Sweden) A. Axelsson / (Spain) M. Ortega	4	6	3
41	(Italy) D. Perino / (Italy) F. Dominguez	6	5	6
LL	(Spain) Jesus Moya / (France) T. Leygue	2	7	4

Round of 16
1	(Spain) Coello / (Argentina) Tapia	6	6
24	(Spain) E. Goenaga / (Spain) G. Collado	2	1
10	(Spain) J. Bautista / (Brazil) L. Bergamini	1	6	6
6	(Spain) Coki / (Spain) M. Yanguas	6	4	2
5	(Argentina) Di Nenno / (Spain) Paquito	6	6
23	(Spain) M. Castaño / (Spain) P.H. Alvarez	3	0
12	(Argentina) G. Alfonso / (Argentina) V. Libaak	4	7	6
3	(Spain) Lebrón / (Argentina) L. Augsburger	6	5	1
4	(Argentina) F. Stupaczuk / (Spain) J. Sanz	6	7
13	(United Arab Emirates) I. Jofre / (Spain) J. Esbri	2	5
11	(Spain) A. Goñi / (Spain) E. Alonso	6	6
7	(Spain) F. Guerrero / (Spain) J. Leal	4	4
30	(Spain) J. Zamora / (Spain) M. Sintes	6	7
14	(Spain) A. Ruiz / (Spain) J.G. Mora	3	5
9	(Argentina) J. Tello / (Argentina) M. Arce	6	3	6
41	(Italy) D. Perino / (Italy) F. Dominguez	3	6	1

Quarter-Final
1	(Spain) Coello / (Argentina) Tapia	6	6
10	(Spain) J. Bautista / (Brazil) L. Bergamini	1	4
5	(Argentina) Di Nenno / (Spain) Paquito	6	1
12	(Argentina) G. Alfonso / (Argentina) V. Libaak	7	6
4	(Argentina) F. Stupaczuk / (Spain) J. Sanz	1	2
11	(Spain) A. Goñi / (Spain) E. Alonso	6	6
30	(Spain) J. Zamora / (Spain) M. Sintes	4	2
9	(Argentina) J. Tello / (Argentina) M. Arce	6	6

Semi-Finals
1	(Spain) Coello / (Argentina) Tapia	6	6
12	(Argentina) G. Alfonso / (Argentina) V. Libaak	2	2
11	(Spain) A. Goñi / (Spain) E. Alonso	4	3
9	(Argentina) J. Tello / (Argentina) M. Arce	6	6

Finals
1	(Spain) Coello / (Argentina) Tapia	6	6
9	(Argentina) J. Tello / (Argentina) M. Arce	1	1

=== Women's Bracket ===
Round of 32
1	(Argentina) D. Brea / (Spain) G. Triay
Bye
20	(Spain) M. Talavan / (Spain) S. Saiz	4	7	6
16	(Spain) J. Castelló / (Spain) M.R. Abajo	6	5	4
12	(Italy) G. Dal Pozzo / (Spain) N. Rodriguez	6	6
28	(France) L. Godallier / (Spain) L. Exposito	1	1
Q	(Spain) C. Carrascosa/ (Spain) M. Fernández	5	1
7	(Spain) A. Alonso / (Spain) M. Guinart	7	6
5	(Spain) M. Ortega / (Portugal) S. Araújo	6	6
Q	(Spain) A. Ortiz / (Argentina) M. Ferreyra	1	0
26	(Spain) A. Cañellas / (Spain) P. Martinez	6	4	1
14	(Italy) C. Orsi / (Spain) P. Llaguno	3	6	6
11	(Spain) J. Velasco / (Spain) R. Barrera	5	7	7
19	(Spain) M. Lobo / (Spain) N. Canovas	7	6	5
Bye
4	(Spain) C. Fernández / (Spain) M. Calvo
3	(Spain) A. Ustero / (Spain) A. Sánchez
Bye
23	(Spain) A. Perez / (Spain) M. Caparros	1	3
10	(Argentina) M. Goyeneche / (Spain) V. Virseda	6	6
9	(Spain) B. Caldera / (Spain) C. Goenaga	6	7
34	(Spain) C. Castillon / (Italy) L. Vano	0	5
31	(Spain) A. Martinez / (Spain) M. Lopez	1	3
6	(Argentina) C. Jensen / (Spain) T. Icardo	6	6
8	(Spain) A. Salazar / (Argentina) A. Osoro	2	6	1
21	(Argentina) J. Bidahorria / (Argentina) V. Riera	6	2	6
17	(Spain) L. Manquillo / (Spain) L. Sainz	6	4
13	(Spain) L. Rufo / (Spain) V. Iglesias	7	6
15	(Spain) J. Velasco / (Spain) R. Barrera	7	3	6
25	(Spain) C. Escacena / (Spain) N. Aguilar	6	6	3
Bye
2	(Spain) B. González / (Spain) P. Josemaria

Round of 16
1	(Argentina) D. Brea / (Spain) G. Triay	6	6
20	(Spain) M. Talavan / (Spain) S. Saiz	0	1
12	(Italy) G. Dal Pozzo / (Spain) N. Rodriguez	6	6	6
7	(Spain) A. Alonso / (Spain) M. Guinart	7	3	2
5	(Spain) M. Ortega / (Portugal) S. Araújo	6	5	6
14	(Italy) C. Orsi / (Spain) P. Llaguno	0	7	4
11	(Spain) J. Velasco / (Spain) R. Barrera	4	6
4	(Spain) C. Fernández / (Spain) M. Calvo	6	7
3	(Spain) A. Ustero / (Spain) A. Sánchez	6	6
10	(Argentina) M. Goyeneche / (Spain) V. Virseda	2	1
9	(Spain) B. Caldera / (Spain) C. Goenaga	6	1
6	(Argentina) C. Jensen / (Spain) T. Icardo	7	6
21	(Argentina) J. Bidahorria / (Argentina) V. Riera	2	2
13	(Spain) L. Rufo / (Spain) V. Iglesias	6	6
15	(Spain) J. Velasco / (Spain) R. Barrera	1	0
2	(Spain) B. González / (Spain) P. Josemaria	6	6

Quarter-Final
1	(Argentina) D. Brea / (Spain) G. Triay	6	6
12	(Italy) G. Dal Pozzo / (Spain) N. Rodriguez	1	0
5	(Spain) M. Ortega / (Portugal) S. Araújo	1	0
4	(Spain) C. Fernández / (Spain) M. Calvo	6	6
3	(Spain) A. Ustero / (Spain) A. Sánchez	3	6	7
6	(Argentina) C. Jensen / (Spain) T. Icardo	6	4	5
13	(Spain) L. Rufo / (Spain) V. Iglesias	2	4
2	(Spain) B. González / (Spain) P. Josemaria	6	6

Semi-Finals
1	(Argentina) D. Brea / (Spain) G. Triay	6	2	7
4	(Spain) C. Fernández / (Spain) M. Calvo	4	6	6
3	(Spain) A. Ustero / (Spain) A. Sánchez	4	7	7
2	(Spain) B. González / (Spain) P. Josemaria	6	6	6

Finals
1	(Argentina) D. Brea / (Spain) G. Triay	3	6	6
3	(Spain) A. Ustero / (Spain) A. Sánchez	6	1	1

== Results ==
=== First Round ===
Men's
Date	Winners	Score	Opponent	Ref.
25/10/2026	(Italy) Flavio Abbate (Argentina) Franco Dal Bianco	6–3 / 6–1	(Spain) Francisco Manuel Gil (Argentina) Ramiro Valenzuela	
25/10/2026	(Spain) Enrique Goenaga (Spain) Guillermo Collado	6–2 / 6–3	(Kuwait) Abdulaziz Redha (Spain) Pau Miñano Ortinez	
25/10/2026	(Argentina) Lucho Capra (Argentina) Maxi Sánchez	6–2 / 6–0	(Qatar) Mashari Nawaf (Qatar) Rashed Nawaf	
25/10/2026	(Spain) Jose Solano Marmolejo (Argentina) Ramiro Pereyra	6–7 / 6–4 / 6–4	(Argentina) Ignacio Piotto (Spain) Javier Barahona	
25/10/2026	(Italy) Alvaro Montiel (Spain) Daniel Santigosa	6–4 / 6–2	(Spain) Javier Ruiz Gonzalez (Spain) Jose Luis Gonzalez	
25/10/2026	(Spain) Manuel Castaño (Spain) Pol Hernandez Alvarez	6–4 / 6–3	(Spain) Albert Roglan Pons (Spain) Manuel Aragon	
25/10/2026	(Spain) Nacho Moragues Moltò (France) Timeo Fonteny	6–2 / 6–4	(Spain) Álvaro Cepero (Spain) Pincho Fernández	
25/10/2026	(Argentina) Juan Cruz Belluati (Paraguay) Martin Abud	3–6 / 6–2 / 7–5	(Spain) Javier Martinez (Spain) Luis Hernandez Quesada	
25/10/2026	(Spain) Andres Fernandez Lancha (Spain) Jose Garcia Diestro	4–6 / 6–0 / 6–3	(Spain) Alonso Rodriguez Martinez (Spain) Pablo Garcia Rodrigo	
25/10/2026	(Argentina) Alex Chozas (Argentina) Juan Ignacio Rubini	1–6 / 7–6 / 6–4	(Spain) David Gala Sánchez (Italy) Enzo Jensen	
25/10/2026	(Spain) Francisco Cabeza (Paraguay) Mariano San Martin	6–2 / 6–3	(Belgium) Clement Geens (France) Dylan Guichard	
25/10/2026	(Argentina) Federico Mouriño (Spain) Marc Quilez	6–4 / 6–3	(Spain) Álvaro Mélendez Amaya (Spain) Gonzalo Rubio	
25/10/2026	(Spain) Juan Zamora (Spain) Marc Sintes	6–2 / 6–3	(United Arab Emirates) Ignacio Vilariño (Spain) Mario Del Castillo	
25/10/2026	(Argentina) Facundo Lopez (Spain) Victor Ruiz	7–5 / 0–6 / 6–2	(Argentina) Leonel Aguirre (Spain) Pablo Lijó	
25/10/2026	(Sweden) Adam Axelsson (Spain) Mario Ortega	4–6 / 7–6 / 6–3	(Argentina) Maxi Sánchez Blasco (Argentina) Sanyo Gutiérrez	
25/10/2026	(Italy) Denis Perino (Italy) Facundo Dominguez	6–3 / 6–3	(Spain) Pablo Castillo (Egypt) Youssef Hossam	

Women's
Date	Winners	Score	Opponent	Ref.
26/10/2026	(Spain) Marta Talavan (Spain) Sofia Saiz	6–2 / 6–4	(Spain) Amanda Lopez Moral (Spain) Camila Fassio Goyeneche	
26/10/2026	(France) Lea Godallier (Spain) Lucia Exposito	7–5 / 6–2	(Spain) Ana Dominguez Gracia (Spain) Julia Polo Bautista	
26/10/2026	(Spain) Cristina Carrascosa Cazorla (Spain) Marisol Fernández	7–6 / 7–5	(Portugal) Ana Catarina Nogueira (Germany) Victoria Kurz	
26/10/2026	(Spain) Anna Ortiz Gasco (Argentina) Maria Laura Ferreyra	2–6 / 6–3 / 6–0	(United Kingdom) Aimee Gibson (Spain) Carla Fernández González	
26/10/2026	(Spain) Ariadna Cañellas (Spain) Patricia Martinez Fortun	3–6 / 6–2 / 6–2	(Italy) Carlotta Casali Vannicelli (Spain) Nerea Guerra Santana	
26/10/2026	(Spain) Marina Lobo (Spain) Noa Canovas	7–5 / 6–1	(Spain) Araceli Martinez (Spain) Lucia Martinez	
26/10/2026	(Spain) Agueda Perez (Spain) Marta Caparros	6–3 / 6–0	(Spain) Ivet Val Lopez (France) Louise Bahurel	
26/10/2026	(Spain) Carmen Castillon (Italy) Lorena Vano	6–2 / 5–0 / W.O.	(Kuwait) Noor Hasan (Spain) Valeria Atencia Basilio	
26/10/2026	(Spain) Aida Martinez (Spain) Natividad Lopez Diaz	6–4 / 6–1	(United Arab Emirates) Dalal Al Qenaei (Spain) Eugenia Guimet	
26/10/2026	(Argentina) Julieta Bidahorria (Argentina) Virginia Riera	6–1 / 6–4	(Netherlands) Bo Luttikhuis (United States) Brittany Dubins	
26/10/2026	(Spain) Letizia Manquillo (Spain) Lucía Sainz	6–3 / 6–1	(Spain) Marta Borrero (Spain) Teresa Navarro	
26/10/2026	(Spain) Claudia Escacena (Spain) Noemi Aguilar	2–6 / 6–4 / 7–5	(France) Alix Collombon (Russia) Ksenia Sharifova	

=== Round of 32 ===
Men's
Date	Winners	Score	Opponent	Ref.
27/10/2026	(Argentina) Agustín Tapia (Spain) Arturo Coello	6–3 / 6–0	(Italy) Flavio Abbate (Argentina) Franco Dal Bianco	
27/10/2026	(Spain) Enrique Goenaga (Spain) Guillermo Collado	6–2 / 7–6	(Spain) Javi Garrido (Argentina) Juan De Pascual	
27/10/2026	(Spain) Jairo Bautista (Brazil) Lucas Bergamini	7–6 / 6–3	(Argentina) Lucho Capra (Argentina) Maxi Sánchez	
27/10/2026	(Spain) Coki Nieto (Spain) Mike Yanguas	6–3 / 3–6 / 6–4	(Spain) Jose Solano Marmolejo (Argentina) Ramiro Pereyra	
26/10/2026	(Argentina) Martin Di Nenno (Spain) Paquito Navarro	6–2 / 6–3	(Italy) Alvaro Montiel (Spain) Daniel Santigosa	
26/10/2026	(Spain) Manuel Castaño (Spain) Pol Hernandez Alvarez	6–3 / 6–3	(Spain) Alejandro Arroyo (Spain) Jose Jimenez Casas	
26/10/2026	(Argentina) Gonzalo Alfonso (Argentina) Valentino Libaak	6–2 / 6–0	(Spain) Nacho Moragues Moltò (France) Timeo Fonteny	
27/10/2026	(Spain) Juan Lebrón (Argentina) Leandro Augsburger	6–4 / 6–3	(Argentina) Juan Cruz Belluati (Paraguay) Martin Abud	
26/10/2026	(Argentina) Franco Stupaczuk (Spain) Jon Sanz	6–2 / 7–6	(Spain) Andres Fernandez Lancha (Spain) Jose Garcia Diestro	
26/10/2026	(United Arab Emirates) Inigo Jofre (Spain) Juanlu Esbri	7–5 / 7–5	(Argentina) Alex Chozas (Argentina) Juan Ignacio Rubini	
27/10/2026	(Spain) Aimar Goñi (Spain) Eduardo Alonso	7–5 / 6–1	(Spain) Francisco Cabeza (Paraguay) Mariano San Martin	
26/10/2026	(Spain) Francisco Guerrero (Spain) Javi Leal	6–1 / 6–7 / 6–3	(Argentina) Federico Mouriño (Spain) Marc Quilez	
26/10/2026	(Spain) Juan Zamora (Spain) Marc Sintes	6–4 / 3–6 / 7–5	(Brazil) Lucas Campagnolo (Spain) Momo González	
26/10/2026	(Spain) Alejandro Ruiz (Spain) Javier Garcia Mora	6–4 / 6–3	(Argentina) Facundo Lopez (Spain) Victor Ruiz	
27/10/2026	(Argentina) Juan Tello (Argentina) Maximiliano Arce	6–4 / 4–6 / 6–3	(Sweden) Adam Axelsson (Spain) Mario Ortega	
27/10/2026	(Italy) Denis Perino (Italy) Facundo Dominguez	6–2 / 5–7 / 6–4	(Spain) Jesus Moya (France) Thomas Leygue	

Women's
Date	Winners	Score	Opponent	Ref.
27/10/2026	(Spain) Marta Talavan (Spain) Sofia Saiz	4–6 / 7–5 / 6–4	(Spain) Jessica Castelló (Spain) Maria Rodriguez Abajo	
27/10/2026	(Italy) Giulia Dal Pozzo (Spain) Nuria Rodriguez	6–1 / 6–1	(France) Lea Godallier (Spain) Lucia Exposito	
27/10/2026	(Spain) Alejandra Alonso (Spain) Marina Guinart	7–5 / 6–1	(Spain) Cristina Carrascosa Cazorla (Spain) Marisol Fernández	
27/10/2026	(Spain) Marta Ortega (Portugal) Sofia Araújo	6–1 / 6–0	(Spain) Anna Ortiz Gasco (Argentina) Maria Laura Ferreyra	
27/10/2026	(Italy) Carolina Orsi (Spain) Patricia Llaguno	3–6 / 6–4 / 6–1	(Spain) Ariadna Cañellas (Spain) Patricia Martinez Fortun	
27/10/2026	(Spain) Jimena Velasco (Spain) Raquel Barrera	5–7 / 7–6 / 7–5	(Spain) Marina Lobo (Spain) Noa Canovas	
27/10/2026	(Argentina) Martina Fassio Goyeneche (Spain) Veronica Virseda	6–1 / 6–3	(Spain) Agueda Perez (Spain) Marta Caparros	
27/10/2026	(Spain) Beatriz Caldera (Spain) Carmen Goenaga	6–0 / 7–5	(Spain) Carmen Castillon (Italy) Lorena Vano	
27/10/2026	(Argentina) Claudia Jensen (Spain) Tamara Icardo	6–1 / 6–3	(Spain) Aida Martinez (Spain) Natividad Lopez Diaz	
27/10/2026	(Argentina) Julieta Bidahorria (Argentina) Virginia Riera	6–2 / 2–6 / 6–1	(Spain) Alejandra Salazar (Argentina) Aranzazu Osoro	
27/10/2026	(Spain) Lorena Rufo (Spain) Victoria Iglesias	7–6 / 6–4	(Spain) Letizia Manquillo (Spain) Lucía Sainz	
27/10/2026	(Spain) Jana Montes (Spain) Marta Barrera	7–6 / 3–6 / 6–3	(Spain) Claudia Escacena (Spain) Noemi Aguilar	

=== Round of 16 ===
Men's
Date	Winners	Score	Opponent	Ref.
28/10/2026	(Argentina) Agustín Tapia (Spain) Arturo Coello	6–2 / 6–1	(Spain) Enrique Goenaga (Spain) Guillermo Collado	
28/10/2026	(Spain) Jairo Bautista (Brazil) Lucas Bergamini	1–6 / 6–4 / 6–2	(Spain) Coki Nieto (Spain) Mike Yanguas	
28/10/2026	(Argentina) Martin Di Nenno (Spain) Paquito Navarro	6–3 / 6–0	(Spain) Manuel Castaño (Spain) Pol Hernandez Alvarez	
28/10/2026	(Argentina) Gonzalo Alfonso (Argentina) Valentino Libaak	4–6 / 7–5 / 6–1	(Spain) Juan Lebrón (Argentina) Leandro Augsburger	
28/10/2026	(Argentina) Franco Stupaczuk (Spain) Jon Sanz	6–2 / 7–5	(United Arab Emirates) Inigo Jofre (Spain) Juanlu Esbri	
28/10/2026	(Spain) Aimar Goñi (Spain) Eduardo Alonso	6–4 / 6–4	(Spain) Francisco Guerrero (Spain) Javi Leal	
28/10/2026	(Spain) Juan Zamora (Spain) Marc Sintes	6–3 / 7–5	(Spain) Alejandro Ruiz (Spain) Javier Garcia Mora	
28/10/2026	(Argentina) Juan Tello (Argentina) Maximiliano Arce	6–3 / 3–6 / 6–1	(Italy) Denis Perino (Italy) Facundo Dominguez	

Women's
Date	Winners	Score	Opponent	Ref.
28/10/2026	(Argentina) Delfina Brea (Spain) Gemma Triay	6–0 / 6–1	(Spain) Marta Talavan (Spain) Sofia Saiz	
28/10/2026	(Italy) Giulia Dal Pozzo (Spain) Nuria Rodriguez	6–7 / 6–3 / 6–2	(Spain) Alejandra Alonso (Spain) Marina Guinart	
28/10/2026	(Spain) Marta Ortega (Portugal) Sofia Araújo	6–0 / 5–7 / 6–4	(Italy) Carolina Orsi (Spain) Patricia Llaguno	
28/10/2026	(Spain) Claudia Fernández (Spain) Martina Calvo	6–4 / 7–6	(Spain) Jimena Velasco (Spain) Raquel Barrera	
28/10/2026	(Spain) Andrea Ustero (Spain) Ariana Sánchez	6–2 / 6–1	(Argentina) Martina Fassio Goyeneche (Spain) Veronica Virseda	
28/10/2026	(Argentina) Claudia Jensen (Spain) Tamara Icardo	7–6 / 6–1	(Spain) Beatriz Caldera (Spain) Carmen Goenaga	
28/10/2026	(Spain) Lorena Rufo (Spain) Victoria Iglesias	6–2 / 6–2	(Argentina) Julieta Bidahorria (Argentina) Virginia Riera	
28/10/2026	(Spain) Bea González (Spain) Paula Josemaría	6–1 / 6–0	(Spain) Jana Montes (Spain) Marta Barrera	

=== Quarter-Finals ===
Men's
Date	Winners	Score	Opponent	Ref.
29/10/2026	(Argentina) Agustín Tapia (Spain) Arturo Coello	6–1 / 6–4	(Spain) Jairo Bautista (Brazil) Lucas Bergamini	
29/10/2026	(Argentina) Gonzalo Alfonso (Argentina) Valentino Libaak	7–6 / 6–1	(Argentina) Martin Di Nenno (Spain) Paquito Navarro	
29/10/2026	(Spain) Aimar Goñi (Spain) Eduardo Alonso	6–1 / 6–2	(Argentina) Franco Stupaczuk (Spain) Jon Sanz	
29/10/2026	(Argentina) Juan Tello (Argentina) Maximiliano Arce	6–4 / 6–2	(Spain) Juan Zamora (Spain) Marc Sintes	

Women's
Date	Winners	Score	Opponent	Ref.
29/10/2026	(Argentina) Delfina Brea (Spain) Gemma Triay	6–1 / 6–0	(Italy) Giulia Dal Pozzo (Spain) Nuria Rodriguez	
29/10/2026	(Spain) Claudia Fernández (Spain) Martina Calvo	6–1 / 6–0	(Spain) Marta Ortega (Portugal) Sofia Araújo	
29/10/2026	(Spain) Andrea Ustero (Spain) Ariana Sánchez	3–6 / 6–4 / 7–5	(Argentina) Claudia Jensen (Spain) Tamara Icardo	
29/10/2026	(Spain) Bea González (Spain) Paula Josemaría	6–2 / 6–4	(Spain) Lorena Rufo (Spain) Victoria Iglesias	

=== Semi-Finals ===
Men's
Date	Winners	Score	Opponent	Ref.
30/10/2026	(Argentina) Agustín Tapia (Spain) Arturo Coello	6–2 / 6–2	(Argentina) Gonzalo Alfonso (Argentina) Valentino Libaak	
30/10/2026	(Argentina) Juan Tello (Argentina) Maximiliano Arce	6–4 / 6–3	(Spain) Aimar Goñi (Spain) Eduardo Alonso	

Women's
Date	Winners	Score	Opponent	Ref.
30/10/2026	(Argentina) Delfina Brea (Spain) Gemma Triay	6–4 / 2–6 / 7–6	(Spain) Claudia Fernández (Spain) Martina Calvo	
30/10/2026	(Spain) Andrea Ustero (Spain) Ariana Sánchez	4–6 / 7–6 / 7–6	(Spain) Bea González (Spain) Paula Josemaría	

=== Finals ===
Men's
Date	Winners	Score	Opponent	Ref.
31/10/2026	(Argentina) Agustín Tapia (Spain) Arturo Coello	6–1 / 6–1	(Argentina) Juan Tello (Argentina) Maximiliano Arce	

Women's
Date	Winners	Score	Opponent	Ref.
31/10/2026	(Argentina) Delfina Brea (Spain) Gemma Triay	3–6 / 6–1 / 6–1	(Spain) Andrea Ustero (Spain) Ariana Sánchez	
