= List of FIP number 1 ranked padel players =

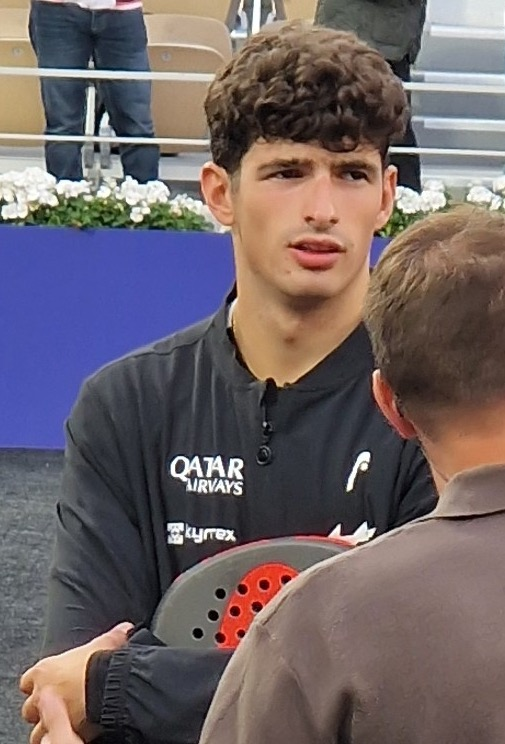
Arturo Coello, one half the current men's singles world No. 1

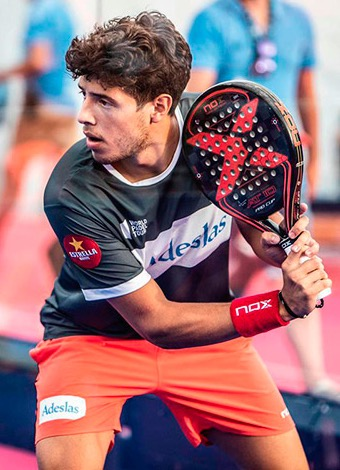
Agustín Tapia, the other half the current men's singles world No. 1

The FIP ranking is the International Padel Federation (FIP) merit-based system for determining rankings in men's padel. The highest-ranked player is the one who has accumulated the most points over the preceding 52 weeks in tournaments on the FIP calendar, which includes events from Premier Padel (the premier circuit) and the FIP Cupra Tour (the secondary circuit). Points are awarded based on a player's best performance in their last 22 tournaments, specifically, the stage they reached, and the category of those competitions.

== Ranking method ==
Since the inception of professional padel, there have been various circuits, each with its own ranking system. The first was the Argentine circuit which, alongside the Padel World Pairs Championship, determined the world's number one players during the 1990s. However, since 2005 and the emergence of the Padel Pro Tour, the players rankings have been determined based on the rankings of the leading professional circuit, with the most recent model being the FIP system, which encompasses the Cupra FIP Tour and Premier Padel circuits.

=== FIP ranking ===
==== 1986–1998 ====
From 1986 to 1998, the ranking was determined based on the APA (Argentine Padel Association) circuits and World Pairs Championship, and in some years, it also included the FEP (Spanish Padel Federation) circuit.

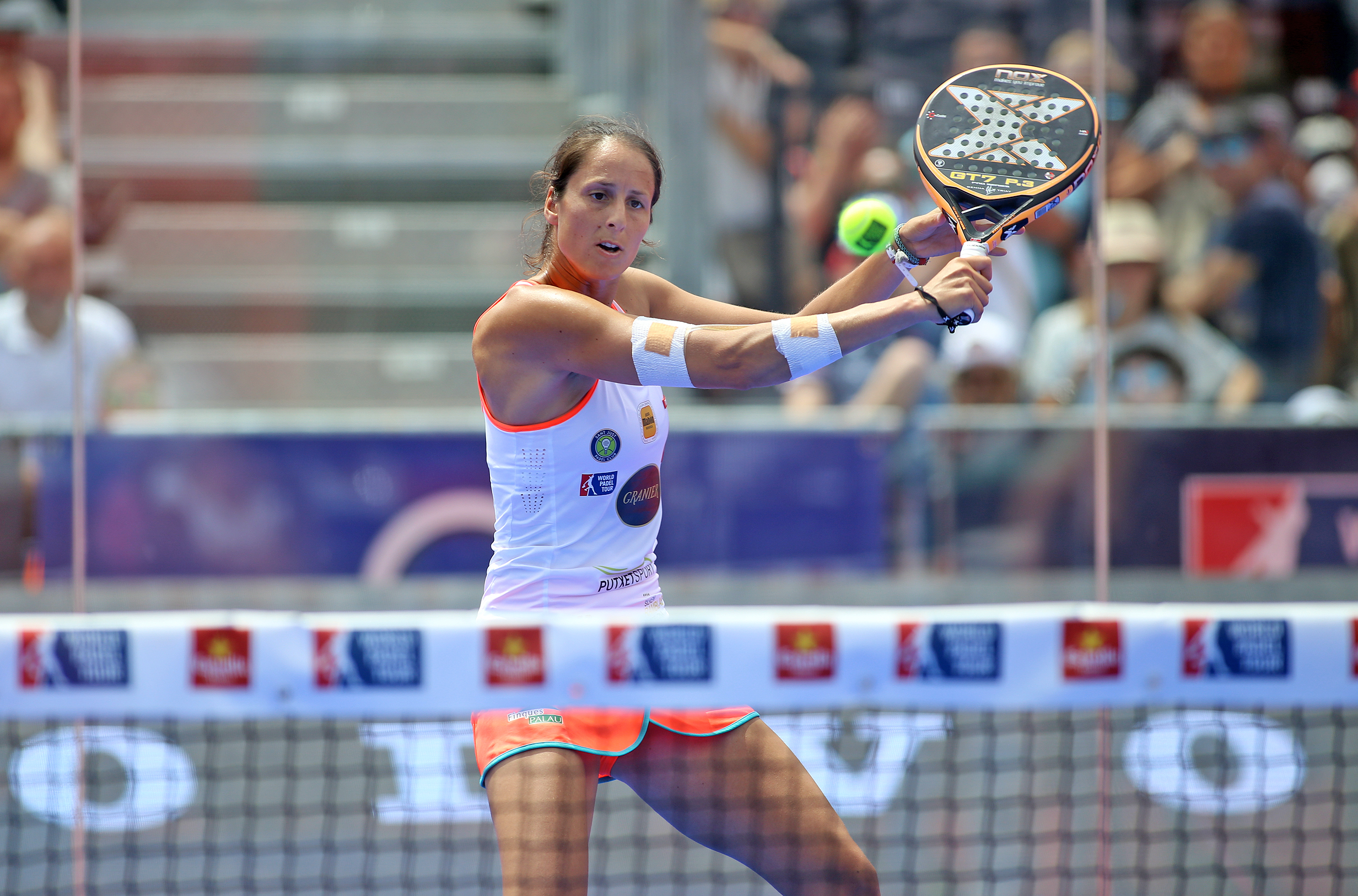
Gemma Triay, four times year-end and current women's world number one.

==== 1999–2005 ====
From 1999 to 2005, the FEP circuit took the place of the Argentine circuit, becoming the premier circuit in world padel. Consequently, rankings came to be determined based on performance in FEP (Spanish Padel Federation) circuits and the World Pairs Championship.

==== 2006–2012 ====
The first international padel circuit was established in 2005 with the aim of expanding the sport. So in 2006 the new circuit, known as the Padel Pro Tour, began organizing its own tournaments, which determined the rankings and crowned the world's best players of each season.

==== 2013–2023 ====
In 2013, the World Padel Tour replaced the Padel Pro Tour as the premier circuit, becoming the tour that determined the world's best players. In 2023, with the emergence of Premier Padel as a rival to the WPT (created in 2022), the World Padel Tour stopped counting the ranking points of the competing circuit's tournaments, resulting in different pairs holding the number-one spot on each circuit by the end of the year. Subsequently, the FIP would recognize a single, unified winner.

==== 2024–Present ====
Since the acquisition of the World Padel Tour and its merger with Premier Padel, the latter has operated as the premier circuit in the padel world and, together with the Cupra FIP Tour, provides the ranking points.

== Records and distinctions ==
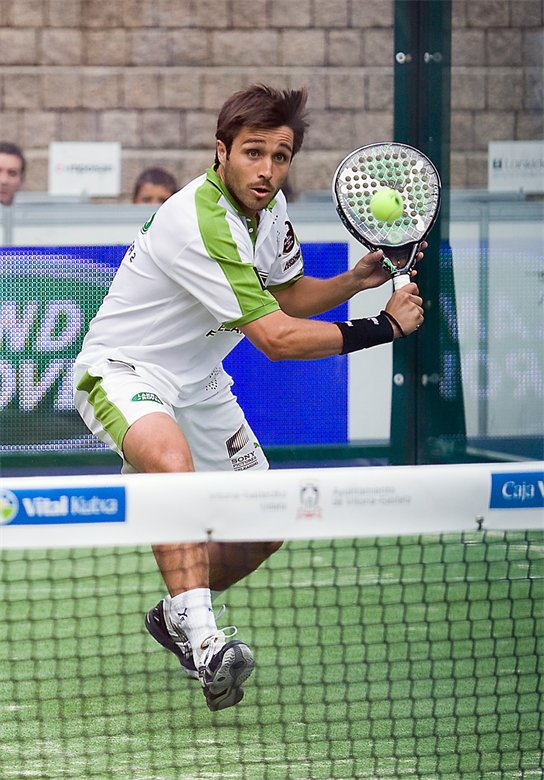
Fernando Belasteguín, world record holder for seasons finished as number one, with 16 consecutive ones.

In the women's division, Iciar Montes holds the record for the most year-end number 1 finishes, having achieved this a total of 10 times. On the men's side, the record is held by Fernando Belasteguín, who accomplished the feat for 16 consecutive years.

Alejandro Lasaigues and Roberto Gattiker hold the record for the most times ranked world number 1 with different partners, they achieved this together and with two additional partners each. On the women's side, Carolina Navarro and Iciar Montes achieved this with four partners, in addition to their time playing together.

Juan Lebrón is tied with Agustín Tapia and Arturo Coello as the active male player with the most year-end number 1 finishes, while Alejandra Salazar and Gemma Triay hold the record on the women's side.

== Year-end No. 1 players ==
Year	Men's		Women's		Professional Circuit(s)
Year	Men's 1st ranked (1/2)	Men's 1st ranked (2/2)	Women's 1st ranked (1/2)	Women's 1st ranked (2/2)	Professional Circuit(s)
1986	(Argentina) Gustavo Maquirrian (1)	(Argentina) Javier Maquirrian (1)	Not contested		Historical sources
1987	(Argentina) Gustavo Maquirrian (2)	(Argentina) Javier Maquirrian (2)	Not contested		Historical sources
1988	(Argentina) Alejandro Lasaigues (1)	(Argentina) Alvarez Clementi (1)	Not contested		APA
1989	(Argentina) Alejandro Lasaigues (2)	(Argentina) Alvarez Clementi (2)	Not contested		APA
1990	(Argentina) Alejandro Lasaigues (3)	(Argentina) Alvarez Clementi (3)	(Argentina) Adriana Costagliola (1)	(Argentina) Cecilia Baccigalupo (1)	APA–FEP
1991	(Argentina) Javier Maquirrain (3)	(Argentina) Roberto Gattiker (1)	(Argentina) Adriana Costagliola (2)	(Argentina) Cecilia Baccigalupo (2)	APA–FEP
1992	(Argentina) Alejandro Lasaigues (4)	(Argentina) Roberto Gattiker (2)	(Argentina) Cecilia Baccigalupo (3)	(Argentina) Virginia Mazzuchi (1)	APA – World championships
1993	(Argentina) Alejandro Lasaigues (5)	(Argentina) Roberto Gattiker (3)	(Argentina) Adriana Costagliola (3)	(Argentina) Claudia Cespedes (1)	APA–FEP
1994	(Argentina) Alejandro Lasaigues (6)	(Argentina) Roberto Gattiker (4)	(Argentina) Adriana Costagliola (4)	(Argentina) Cecilia Baccigalupo (4)	APA – World championships
1995	(Argentina) Alejandro Lasaigues (7)	(Argentina) Roberto Gattiker (5)	(Argentina) Adriana Costagliola (5)	(Argentina) Cecilia Baccigalupo (5)	APA – FEP
1996	(Argentina) Alejandro Lasaigues (8)	(Argentina) Roberto Gattiker (6)	(Argentina) Adriana Costagliola (6)	(Argentina) Cecilia Baccigalupo (6)	APA – World championships
1997	(Argentina) Alejandro Lasaigues (9)	(Argentina) Hernan Auguste (1)	(Spain) Belen Castrillo (1)	(Spain) Iciar Montes (1)	APA – FEP
1998	(Argentina) Cristian Gutiérrez (1)	(Argentina) Roberto Gattiker (7)	(Spain) Araceli Montero (1)	(Spain) Iciar Montes (2)	APA – World championships – FEP
1999	(Spain) Alberto Rodríguez Piñón (1)	(Argentina) Cristian Gutiérrez (2)	(Spain) Iciar Montes (3)	(Spain) Carolina Navarro (1)	FEP
2000	(Argentina) Hernan Auguste (2)	(Spain) Juan Martín Díaz (1)	(Spain) Iciar Montes (4)	(Spain) Carolina Navarro (2)	FEP – World championships
2001	(Argentina) Gabriel Reca (1)	(Argentina) Sebastián Nerone (1)	(Spain) Iciar Montes (5)	(Spain) Carolina Navarro (3)	FEP
2002	(Argentina) Fernando Belasteguín (1)	(Spain) Juan Martín Díaz (2)	(Spain) Iciar Montes (6)	(Brazil) Neki Berwig (1)	FEP – World championships
2003	(Argentina) Fernando Belasteguín (2)	(Spain) Juan Martín Díaz (3)	(Spain) Carolina Navarro (4)	(Argentina) Paula Eyheraguibel (1)	FEP
2004	(Argentina) Fernando Belasteguín (3)	(Spain) Juan Martín Díaz (4)	(Spain) Iciar Montes (7)	(Argentina) Paula Eyheraguibel (2)	FEP – World championships
2005	(Argentina) Fernando Belasteguín (4)	(Spain) Juan Martín Díaz (5)	(Spain) Iciar Montes (8)	(Brazil) Neki Berwig (2)	FEP
2006	(Argentina) Fernando Belasteguín (5)	(Spain) Juan Martín Díaz (6)	(Spain) Iciar Montes (9)	(Brazil) Neki Berwig (3)	Padel Pro Tour
2007	(Argentina) Fernando Belasteguín (6)	(Spain) Juan Martín Díaz (7)	(Spain) Iciar Montes (10)	(Brazil) Neki Berwig (4)	Padel Pro Tour
2008	(Argentina) Fernando Belasteguín (7)	(Spain) Juan Martín Díaz (8)	(Spain) Carolina Navarro (5)	(Argentina) Catalina Tenorio (1)	Padel Pro Tour
2009	(Argentina) Fernando Belasteguín (8)	(Spain) Juan Martín Díaz (9)	(Spain) Alejandra Salazar (1)	(Spain) Carolina Navarro (6)	Padel Pro Tour
2010	(Argentina) Fernando Belasteguín (9)	(Spain) Juan Martín Díaz (10)	(Spain) Carolina Navarro (7)	(Argentina) Cecilia Reiter (1)	Padel Pro Tour
2011	(Argentina) Fernando Belasteguín (10)	(Spain) Juan Martín Díaz (11)	(Spain) Carolina Navarro (8)	(Argentina) Cecilia Reiter (2)	Padel Pro Tour
2012	(Argentina) Fernando Belasteguín (11)	(Spain) Juan Martín Díaz (12)	(Spain) Carolina Navarro (9)	(Argentina) Cecilia Reiter (3)	Padel Pro Tour
2013	(Argentina) Fernando Belasteguín (12)	(Spain) Juan Martín Díaz (13)	(Spain) Elisabeth Amatriain (1)	(Spain) Patricia Llaguno (1)	World Padel Tour
2014	(Argentina) Fernando Belasteguín (13)	(Spain) Juan Martín Díaz (14)	(Spain) Majo Sánchez (1)	(Spain) Mapi Sánchez (1)	World Padel Tour
2015	(Argentina) Fernando Belasteguín (14)	(Brazil) Pablo Lima (1)	(Spain) Majo Sánchez (2)	(Spain) Mapi Sánchez (2)	World Padel Tour
2016	(Argentina) Fernando Belasteguín (15)	(Brazil) Pablo Lima (2)	(Spain) Alejandra Salazar (2)	(Spain) Marta Marrero (1)	World Padel Tour
2017	(Argentina) Fernando Belasteguín (16)	(Brazil) Pablo Lima (3)	(Spain) Majo Sánchez (3)	(Spain) Mapi Sánchez (3)	World Padel Tour
2018	(Argentina) Maxi Sánchez (1)	(Argentina) Sanyo Gutiérrez (1)	(Spain) Majo Sánchez (4)	(Spain) Mapi Sánchez (4)	World Padel Tour
2019	(Spain) Juan Lebrón (1)	(Spain) Paquito Navarro (1)	(Spain) Marta Marrero (2)	(Spain) Marta Ortega (1)	World Padel Tour – FIP Ranking
2020	(Spain) Alejandro Galán (1)	(Spain) Juan Lebrón (2)	(Spain) Gemma Triay (1)	(Spain) Lucía Sainz (1)	World Padel Tour – FIP Ranking
2021	(Spain) Alejandro Galán (2)	(Spain) Juan Lebrón (3)	(Spain) Alejandra Salazar (3)	(Spain) Gemma Triay (2)	World Padel Tour – FIP Ranking
2022	(Spain) Alejandro Galán (3)	(Spain) Juan Lebrón (4)	(Spain) Alejandra Salazar (4)	(Spain) Gemma Triay (3)	World Padel Tour – FIP Ranking
2023	(Argentina) Agustín Tapia (1)	(Spain) Arturo Coello (1)	(Spain) Ariana Sánchez (1)	(Spain) Paula Josemaría (1)	FIP Ranking
2024	(Argentina) Agustín Tapia (2)	(Spain) Arturo Coello (2)	(Spain) Ariana Sánchez (2)	(Spain) Paula Josemaría (2)	FIP Ranking
2025	(Argentina) Agustín Tapia (3)	(Spain) Arturo Coello (3)	(Argentina) Delfina Brea (1)	(Spain) Gemma Triay (4)	FIP Ranking
2026	(Argentina) Agustín Tapia (4)	(Spain) Arturo Coello (4)	—	—	FIP Ranking

== Year-end No. 1 per player ==
Men's
N.	Player	Year(s)	Total
1.	(Argentina) Fernando Belasteguín	2002–2017	16
2.	(Spain) Juan Martín Díaz	2000, 2002–2014	14
3.	(Argentina) Alejandro Lasaigues	1988–90, 1992–97	9
4.	(Argentina) Roberto Gattiker	1991–96, 1998	7
5.	(Spain) Juan Lebrón	2019–2022	4
5.	(Argentina) Agustín Tapia	2023–2026	4
5.	(Spain) Arturo Coello	2023–2026	4
6.	(Argentina) Javier Maquirrain	1986, 1987, 1991	3
6.	(Argentina) Alvarez Clementi	1988–1990	3
6.	(Brazil) Pablo Lima	2015–2017	3
6.	(Spain) Alejandro Galán	2020–2022	3
7.	(Argentina) Gustavo Maquirrian	1986, 1987	2
7.	(Argentina) Hernan Auguste	1997, 2000	2
7.	(Argentina) Cristian Gutiérrez	1998, 1999	2
8.	(Spain) Alberto Rodríguez Piñón	1999	1
8.	(Argentina) Gabriel Reca	2001	1
8.	(Argentina) Sebastián Nerone	2001	1
8.	(Argentina) Maxi Sánchez	2018	1
8.	(Argentina) Sanyo Gutiérrez	2018	1
8.	(Spain) Paquito Navarro	2019	1

Women's
N.	Player	Year(s)	Total
1.	(Spain) Iciar Montes	1997–2002, 2004–2007	10
2.	(Spain) Carolina Navarro	1999–2001, 2003, 2008–2012	9
3.	(Argentina) Adriana Costagliola	1990–1991, 1993–1996	6
3.	(Argentina) Cecilia Baccigalupo	1990–1992, 1994–1996	6
4.	(Brazil) Neki Berwig	2002, 2005–2007	4
4.	(Spain) Alejandra Salazar	2009, 2005, 2021, 2022	4
4.	(Spain) Majo Sánchez	2014, 2015, 2017, 2018	4
4.	(Spain) Mapi Sánchez	2014, 2015, 2017, 2018	4
4.	(Spain) Gemma Triay	2020, 2021, 2022, 2025	4
5.	(Argentina) Cecilia Reiter	2010–2012	3
6.	(Argentina) Paula Eyheraguibel	2003, 2004	2
6.	(Spain) Marta Marrero	2016, 2019	2
6.	(Spain) Ariana Sánchez	2023, 2024	2
6.	(Spain) Paula Josemaría	2023, 2024	2
7.	(Argentina) Claudia Cespedes	1992	1
7.	(Argentina) Virginia Mazzuchi	1992	1
7.	(Spain) Araceli Montero	1997	1
7.	(Spain) Belen Castrillo	1998	1
7.	(Argentina) Catalina Tenorio	2008	1
7.	(Spain) Elisabeth Amatriain	2013	1
7.	(Spain) Patricia Llaguno	2013	1
7.	(Spain) Marta Ortega	2019	1
7.	(Spain) Lucía Sainz	2020	1
7.	(Argentina) Delfina Brea	2025	1

== See also ==
- Padel Pro Tour
- World Padel Tour
- Premier Padel
- Padel World Championship
