= 2018 WPT Zaragoza Open =

World Padel Tour tournament held in Zaragoza, Spain

- Date: 30 April – 6 May
- Edition: 7th (Note: The first four editions were held under the organization of the Padel Pro Tour.)
- Category: Open
- Location: Zaragoza, Spain
- Venue: Pabellón Príncipe Felipe

Champions
- Men's doubles: (Argentina) Maxi Sánchez (Argentina) Sanyo Gutiérrez
- Women's doubles: (Spain) Gemma Triay (Spain) Lucía Sainz

Chronology

The 2018 Zaragoza Open (officially 2018 World Padel Tour Zaragoza Open) was the third tournament of the sixth season organized by World Padel Tour, the most prestigious padel circuit at the time.

In the women's category, the top two ranked pairs met in the final for the first time this season. In the battle for the title, Gemma Triay and Lucia Sainz defeated the world number ones, the twins Majo and Mapi Sánchez Alayeto, claiming their second title of the season and successfully defending the title they had won in Zaragoza the previous year.

In the men's category, the second-seeded pair, Juan Martín Díaz and Paquito Navarro, took advantage of the absence of world number ones Fernando Belasteguín and Pablo Lima to reach the final. In the decisive match, Díaz and Paquito faced the world's number two pair, Maxi Sánchez and Sanyo Gutiérrez, who defeated them, thereby securing their second title of the year and becoming champions in Zaragoza for the first time.

== Relevant Data ==
=== World No. 1s miss Zaragoza tournament due to injury ===
Following the event's presentation, Fernando Belasteguín announced on social media that he and his partner, Pablo Lima, would not compete in the tournament. Although he tried to accelerate his recovery, he was not ready in time for the Zaragoza event due to acute epicondylitis in his right elbow, however, he would participate in the next tournament in Jaén. Consequently, Maxi Sánchez and Sanyo Gutiérrez took the top spot in the tournament draw.

=== Juan Martín Díaz returns to the finals ===
Juan Martín Díaz, who held the world number one spot for 13 years alongside Fernando Belasteguín (and another year individually before they teamed up), managed to reach a World Padel Tour final again alongside Paquito Navarro. Now 43 years old and having spent a full year sidelined by injury, recovering from two surgeries to treat the same issue, he proved that he remained competitive by reaching his first final since 2016, when he played alongside Cristian Gutiérrez.

== Head-to-head record between teams ranked in the top 4 during the season ==
=== Men's ===
Record	Belasteguín–Lima	Maxi–Sanyo	J.M. Díaz–Paquito	Gutiérrez–Stupaczuk
Belasteguín–Lima	—	—	1–0	1–0
Maxi–Sanyo	—	—	1–0	—
J.M. Díaz–Paquito	0–1	0–1	—	—
Gutiérrez–Stupaczuk	0–1	—	—	—

=== Women's ===
Record	Majo–Mapi	Marrero–Salazar	Triay–Sainz	Amatriain–Llaguno	Former Pairs	Ariana–Ortega
Majo–Mapi	—	0–1	0–2	2–0		—
Marrero–Salazar	1–0	—	1–2	1–0		2–0
Triay–Sainz	2–0	2–1	—	—		—
Amatriain–Llaguno	0–2	0–1		—		1–0
Former Pairs						
Ariana–Ortega	—	0–2	—	0–1		—

== Draws ==
=== Men's Bracket ===
Round of 32
1	(Argentina) Maxi / (Argentina) Sanyo
Bye
(Spain) A. Blanco / (Spain) B. Yribarren	3	2
(Argentina) G. Tamame / (Argentina) M. Marina	6	6
(Spain) A. Santana / (Spain) I. Gadea	7	6
(Argentina) J. Escalante / (Spain) J. Muñoz	6	2
(Argentina) L. Capra / (Argentina) R. Moyano	6	6
(Argentina) F. Poggi / (Argentina) G. Reca	1	0
(Spain) A. Cepero / (Argentina) Godo Díaz	4	6	3
Q	(Spain) J. Rico / (Spain) V. Ruiz	6	4	6
LL	(Spain) G. Company / (Spain) R. Rivera	3	2
(Brazil) L. Bergamini / (Brazil) L. Campagnolo	6	6
(Spain) M. Piñeiro / (Spain) W. Lahoz	6	6
Q	(Spain) E. Moreno / (Brazil) F. Gomes	3	4
Bye
3	(Argentina) C. Gutiérrez / (Argentina) Stupaczuk
4	(Spain) Galán / (Spain) M. Díaz
Bye
(Spain) J.G. Diestro / (Argentina) S. Nerone	6	6
Q	(Argentina) Di Nenno / (Argentina) J. Restivo	3	4
(Spain) J. Ruiz / (Spain) U. Botello	6	6
(Argentina) M. Grabiel / (Spain) P. Lijó	3	2
(Brazil) M. Jardim / (Argentina) Tapia	3	7	5
(Spain) J. Mieres / (Argentina) M. Lamperti	6	6	7
(Argentina) J.C. Belluati / (Spain) Lebrón	6	6
(Argentina) A. Allemandi / (Argentina) F. Quiles	3	3
(Argentina) Chingotto / (Argentina) J. Tello	7	6
Q	(Argentina) M. Nicoletti / (Spain) T. Bueno	6	3
(Argentina) A. Silingo / (Spain) A. Ruiz	6	7	6
(Argentina) A. Patiniotis / (Spain) P.A. Martinez	7	6	2
Bye
2	(Spain) J.M. Díaz / (Spain) Paquito

Round of 16
1	(Argentina) Maxi / (Argentina) Sanyo	6	6
(Argentina) G. Tamame / (Argentina) M. Marina	4	2
(Spain) A. Santana / (Spain) I. Gadea	2	2
(Argentina) L. Capra / (Argentina) R. Moyano	6	6
Q	(Spain) J. Rico / (Spain) V. Ruiz	7	3	6
(Brazil) L. Bergamini / (Brazil) L. Campagnolo	6	6	7
(Spain) M. Piñeiro / (Spain) W. Lahoz	6	1	2
3	(Argentina) C. Gutiérrez / (Argentina) Stupaczuk	2	6	6
4	(Spain) Galán / (Spain) M. Díaz	6	6
(Spain) J.G. Diestro / (Argentina) S. Nerone	2	2
(Spain) J. Ruiz / (Spain) U. Botello
(Spain) J. Mieres / (Argentina) M. Lamperti	4	6	6
(Argentina) J.C. Belluati / (Spain) Lebrón	6	7
(Argentina) Chingotto / (Argentina) J. Tello	4	6
(Argentina) A. Silingo / (Spain) A. Ruiz	3	4
2	(Spain) J.M. Díaz / (Spain) Paquito	6	6

Quarter-Final
1	(Argentina) Maxi / (Argentina) Sanyo	6	6
(Argentina) L. Capra / (Argentina) R. Moyano	4	3
(Brazil) L. Bergamini / (Brazil) L. Campagnolo	6	4	7
3	(Argentina) C. Gutiérrez / (Argentina) Stupaczuk	3	6	5
4	(Spain) Galán / (Spain) M. Díaz	6	7
(Spain) J. Mieres / (Argentina) M. Lamperti	2	5
(Argentina) J.C. Belluati / (Spain) Lebrón	6	2	2
2	(Spain) J.M. Díaz / (Spain) Paquito	3	6	6

Semi-Finals
1	(Argentina) Maxi / (Argentina) Sanyo	2	6	6
(Brazil) L. Bergamini / (Brazil) L. Campagnolo	6	1	2
4	(Spain) Galán / (Spain) M. Díaz	7	5	4
2	(Spain) J.M. Díaz / (Spain) Paquito	6	7	6

Finals
1	(Argentina) Maxi / (Argentina) Sanyo	6	6	6
2	(Spain) J.M. Díaz / (Spain) Paquito	4	7	3

=== Women's Bracket ===
Round of 32
1	(Spain) Majo / (Spain) Mapi
Bye
(Spain) M. Gonzalez / (Spain) S. Vidal	3	2
(Spain) C. Mesa / (Spain) L. Martínez	6	6
Q	(Spain) L. Alonso / (Argentina) V. Riera	6	7
(Spain) M. Talaván / (Spain) T. Icardo	3	6
(Spain) P. Josemaria / (Argentina) V. Pavon	4	1
(Spain) C. Navarro / (Argentina) C. Reiter	6	6
(Spain) T. Navarro / (Spain) V. Iglesias
(Spain) M. Villalba / (Spain) N. Rovira
(Spain) I. Domínguez / (Spain) V. Alonso	5	6
Q	(Spain) A. Martínez / (Spain) E. Carnicero	7	7
(Spain) S. Hernández / (Spain) V. Virseda	6	6
Q	(Spain) A. Cañellas / (Spain) M. Pinacho	0	2
Bye
4	(Spain) E. Amatriain / (Spain) P. Llaguno
3	(Spain) A. Salazar / (Spain) M. Marrero
Bye
(Portugal) A.C. Nogueira / (Argentina) Delfina	6	6
(Spain) C. Pérez / (Spain) N. Marquez	2	0
(Spain) A. Blanco / (Spain) B. Caldera	1	6	6
(France) L. Clergue / (Spain) M. Truchado	6	1	2
(Spain) A. Cantin / (Spain) N. Rodriguez	4	4
(Spain) A. Sánchez / (Spain) M. Ortega	6	6
(Spain) B. González / (Argentina) C. Tenorio	4	6	6
(Spain) A.F. de Ossó / (Spain) M. Gabarrus	6	4	3
(Spain) A. Medina / (Spain) E. Ramirez	1	6	3
(Argentina) G. Bartomioli / (Spain) S. Ruiz	6	3	6
(Argentina) A. Osoro / (Argentina) N. Brito	6	6
(Venezuela) A. Cali / (Spain) E. Lasheras	3	1
Bye
2	(Spain) Gemma / (Spain) L. Sainz

Round of 16
1	(Spain) Majo / (Spain) Mapi	6	6
(Spain) C. Mesa / (Spain) L. Martínez	2	2
(Spain) L. Alonso / (Argentina) V. Riera	0	3
(Spain) C. Navarro / (Argentina) C. Reiter	6	6
(Spain) T. Navarro / (Spain) V. Iglesias	6	6
(Spain) A. Martínez / (Spain) E. Carnicero	3	0
(Spain) S. Hernández / (Spain) V. Virseda	4	2
4	(Spain) E. Amatriain / (Spain) P. Llaguno	6	6
3	(Spain) A. Salazar / (Spain) M. Marrero	7	7
(Portugal) A.C. Nogueira / (Argentina) Delfina	5	6
(Spain) A. Blanco / (Spain) B. Caldera	4	4
(Spain) A. Sánchez / (Spain) M. Ortega	6	6
(Spain) B. González / (Argentina) C. Tenorio	5	3
(Argentina) G. Bartomioli / (Spain) S. Ruiz	7	6
(Argentina) A. Osoro / (Argentina) N. Brito	2	2
2	(Spain) Gemma / (Spain) L. Sainz	6	6

Quarter-Final
1	(Spain) Majo / (Spain) Mapi	6	6
(Spain) C. Navarro / (Argentina) C. Reiter	1	1
(Spain) T. Navarro / (Spain) V. Iglesias	1	4
4	(Spain) E. Amatriain / (Spain) P. Llaguno	6	6
3	(Spain) A. Salazar / (Spain) M. Marrero	6	6	7
(Spain) A. Sánchez / (Spain) M. Ortega	7	4	6
(Argentina) G. Bartomioli / (Spain) S. Ruiz	1	2
2	(Spain) Gemma / (Spain) L. Sainz	6	6

Semi-Finals
1	(Spain) Majo / (Spain) Mapi	5	6	6
4	(Spain) E. Amatriain / (Spain) P. Llaguno	7	2	4
3	(Spain) A. Salazar / (Spain) M. Marrero	5	6	4
2	(Spain) Gemma / (Spain) L. Sainz	7	4	6

Finals
1	(Spain) Majo / (Spain) Mapi	7	6	1
2	(Spain) Gemma / (Spain) L. Sainz	5	7	6

== Results ==
=== Round of 32 ===
Men's

Date	Winners	Score	Opponent	Refs.
2/5/2018	(Argentina) German Tamame (Argentina) Matías Marina	6–3 / 6–2	(Spain) Adrián Blanco (Spain) Borja Yribarren	
2/5/2018	(Spain) Aday Santana (Spain) Nacho Gadea	7–6 / 6–2	(Argentina) Javier Escalante (Spain) Jordi Muñoz	
2/5/2018	(Argentina) Lucho Capra (Argentina) Ramiro Moyano	6–1 / 6–0	(Argentina) Fernando Poggi (Argentina) Gaby Reca	
2/5/2018	(Spain) José Rico (Spain) Víctor Ruiz	6–4 / 4–6 / 6–3	(Spain) Álvaro Cepero (Argentina) Godo Díaz	
2/5/2018	(Brazil) Lucas Bergamini (Brazil) Lucas Campagnolo	6–3 / 6–2	(Spain) Gerard Company (Spain) Rubén Rivera	
2/5/2018	(Spain) Martin Sanchez Piñeiro (Spain) Willy Lahoz	6–3 / 6–4	(Spain) Ernesto Moreno (Brazil) Francisco Gomes	
2/5/2018	(Spain) José García Diestro (Argentina) Sebastián Nerone	6–3 / 6–4	(Argentina) Juan Manuel Restivo (Argentina) Martín Di Nenno	
2/5/2018	(Spain) Javi Ruiz (Spain) Uri Botello	6–3 / 6–2	(Argentina) Maxi Grabiel (Spain) Pablo Lijó	
2/5/2018	(Spain) Juani Mieres (Argentina) Miguel Lamperti	6–3 / 6–7 / 7–5	(Argentina) Agustín Tapia (Brazil) Marcello Jardim	
2/5/2018	(Argentina) Juan Cruz Belluati (Spain) Juan Lebrón	6–3 / 6–3	(Argentina) Adrian Allemandi (Argentina) Federico Quiles	
2/5/2018	(Argentina) Federico Chingotto (Argentina) Juan Tello	7–6 / 6–3	(Argentina) Matías Nicoletti (Spain) Toni Bueno	
2/5/2018	(Argentina) Agustin Gomez Silingo (Spain) Alejandro Ruiz	6–7 / 7–6 / 6–2	(Argentina) Aris Patiniotis (Spain) Pedro Alonso Martinez	

Women's

Date	Winners	Score	Opponent	Refs.
2/5/2018	(Spain) Carla Mesa (Spain) Lucía Martínez	6–3 / 6–2	(Argentina) Alicia Lilian Berl (Spain) Silvia Lopez Vidal	
2/5/2018	(Spain) Lorena Alonso (Argentina) Virginia Riera	6–3 / 7–6	(Spain) Marta Talaván (Spain) Tamara Icardo	
2/5/2018	(Spain) Carolina Navarro (Argentina) Cecilia Reiter	6–4 / 6–1	(Spain) Paula Josemaria (Argentina) Valeria Pavon	
2/5/2018	(Spain) Teresa Navarro (Spain) Victoria Iglesias	6–4 / 6–4	(Spain) Maria Villalba (Spain) Nuria Rovira	
2/5/2018	(Spain) Araceli Martínez (Spain) Esther Carnicero	7–5 / 7–6	(Spain) Isabel Domínguez (Spain) Vanesa Alonso	
2/5/2018	(Spain) Sandra Hernández (Spain) Verónica Virseda	6–0 / 6–2	(Spain) Ariadna Cañellas (Spain) Marina Pinacho	
2/5/2018	(Portugal) Ana Catarina Nogueira (Argentina) Delfina Brea	6–2 / 6–0	(Spain) Cynthia Pérez Domenech (Spain) Noelia Marquez	
2/5/2018	(Spain) Alicia Blanco Rojo (Spain) Beatriz Caldera	1–6 / 6–1 / 6–2	(France) Laura Clergue (Spain) Meli García Truchado	
2/5/2018	(Spain) Ariana Sánchez (Spain) Marta Ortega	6–0 / 7–6	(Spain) Angela Caro Cantin (Spain) Nuria Rodriguez	
2/5/2018	(Spain) Beatriz González (Argentina) Catalina Tenorio	4–6 / 6–4 / 6–3	(Spain) Ana Fernandez de Ossó (Spain) Maite Gabarrus Alonso	
2/5/2018	(Spain) Andrea Medina (Argentina) Gabriela Bartomioli	6–1 / 3–6 / 6–3	(Spain) Andrea Medina (Spain) Elena Ramirez	
2/5/2018	(Argentina) Aranzazu Osoro (Argentina) Nela Brito	6–3 / 6–1	(Venezuela) Ana Seijas Cali (Spain) Esther Lasheras	

=== Round of 16 ===
Men's

Date	Winners	Score	Opponent	Refs.
3/5/2018	(Argentina) Maxi Sánchez (Argentina) Sanyo Gutiérrez	6–4 / 6–2	(Argentina) German Tamame (Argentina) Matías Marina	
3/5/2018	(Argentina) Lucho Capra (Argentina) Ramiro Moyano	6–2 / 6–2	(Spain) Aday Santana (Spain) Nacho Gadea	
3/5/2018	(Brazil) Lucas Bergamini (Brazil) Lucas Campagnolo	6–7 / 6–3 / 7–6	(Spain) José Rico (Spain) Víctor Ruiz	
3/5/2018	(Argentina) Cristian Gutiérrez (Argentina) Franco Stupaczuk	2–6 / 6–1 / 6–2	(Spain) Martin Sanchez Piñeiro (Spain) Willy Lahoz	
3/5/2018	(Spain) Alejandro Galán (Spain) Matías Díaz	6–2 / 6–2	(Spain) José García Diestro (Argentina) Sebastián Nerone	
3/5/2018	(Spain) Juani Mieres (Argentina) Miguel Lamperti	4–6 / 6–3 / 6–4	(Spain) Javi Ruiz (Spain) Uri Botello	
3/5/2018	(Argentina) Juan Cruz Belluati (Spain) Juan Lebrón	6–4 / 7–6	(Argentina) Federico Chingotto (Argentina) Juan Tello	
3/5/2018	(Spain) Juan Martin Díaz (Spain) Paquito Navarro	6–3 / 6–4	(Argentina) Agustin Gomez Silingo (Spain) Alejandro Ruiz	

Women's

Date	Winners	Score	Opponent	Refs.
3/5/2018	(Spain) Majo Sanchez (Spain) Mapi Sanchez	6–2 / 6–2	(Spain) Carla Mesa (Spain) Lucía Martínez	
3/5/2018	(Spain) Carolina Navarro (Argentina) Cecilia Reiter	6–0 / 6–3	(Spain) Lorena Alonso (Argentina) Virginia Riera	
3/5/2018	(Spain) Teresa Navarro (Spain) Victoria Iglesias	6–3 / 6–0	(Spain) Araceli Martínez (Spain) Esther Carnicero	
3/5/2018	(Spain) Elisabeth Amatriain (Spain) Patricia Llaguno	6–4 / 6–2	(Spain) Sandra Hernández (Spain) Verónica Virseda	
3/5/2018	(Spain) Alejandra Salazar (Spain) Marta Marrero	7–5 / 7–6	(Portugal) Ana Catarina Nogueira (Argentina) Delfina Brea	
3/5/2018	(Spain) Ariana Sánchez (Spain) Marta Ortega	6–4 / 6–4	(Spain) Alicia Blanco Rojo (Spain) Beatriz Caldera	
3/5/2018	(Spain) Andrea Medina (Argentina) Gabriela Bartomioli	7–5 / 6–3	(Spain) Beatriz González (Argentina) Catalina Tenorio	
3/5/2018	(Spain) Gemma Triay (Spain) Lucía Sainz	6–2 / 6–2	(Argentina) Aranzazu Osoro (Argentina) Nela Brito	

=== Quarter-Finals ===
Men's

Date	Winners	Score	Opponent	Refs.
4/5/2018	(Argentina) Maxi Sánchez (Argentina) Sanyo Gutiérrez	6–4 / 6–3	(Argentina) Lucho Capra (Argentina) Ramiro Moyano	
4/5/2018	(Brazil) Lucas Bergamini (Brazil) Lucas Campagnolo	6–3 / 4–6 / 7–5	(Argentina) Cristian Gutiérrez (Argentina) Franco Stupaczuk	
4/5/2018	(Spain) Alejandro Galán (Spain) Matías Díaz	6–2 / 7–5	(Spain) Juani Mieres (Argentina) Miguel Lamperti	
4/5/2018	(Spain) Juan Martin Díaz (Spain) Paquito Navarro	3–6 / 6–2 / 6–2	(Argentina) Juan Cruz Belluati (Spain) Juan Lebrón	

Women's

Date	Winners	Score	Opponent	Refs.
4/5/2018	(Spain) Majo Sanchez (Spain) Mapi Sanchez	6–1 / 6–1	(Spain) Carolina Navarro (Argentina) Cecilia Reiter	
4/5/2018	(Spain) Elisabeth Amatriain (Spain) Patricia Llaguno	6–1 / 6–4	(Spain) Teresa Navarro (Spain) Victoria Iglesias	
4/5/2018	(Spain) Alejandra Salazar (Spain) Marta Marrero	6–7 / 6–4 / 7–6	(Spain) Ariana Sánchez (Spain) Marta Ortega	
4/5/2018	(Spain) Gemma Triay (Spain) Lucía Sainz	6–1 / 6–2	(Spain) Andrea Medina (Argentina) Gabriela Bartomioli	

=== Semi-Finals ===
Men's

Date	Winners	Score	Opponent	Refs.
5/5/2018	(Argentina) Maxi Sánchez (Argentina) Sanyo Gutiérrez	2–6 / 6–1 / 6–2	(Brazil) Lucas Bergamini (Brazil) Lucas Campagnolo	
5/5/2018	(Spain) Juan Martin Díaz (Spain) Paquito Navarro	6–7 / 7–5 / 6–4	(Spain) Alejandro Galán (Spain) Matías Díaz	

Women's

Date	Winners	Score	Opponent	Refs.
5/5/2018	(Spain) Majo Sanchez (Spain) Mapi Sanchez	5–7 / 6–2 / 6–4	(Spain) Elisabeth Amatriain (Spain) Patricia Llaguno	
5/5/2018	(Spain) Gemma Triay (Spain) Lucía Sainz	7–5 / 4–6 / 6–4	(Spain) Alejandra Salazar (Spain) Marta Marrero	

=== Finals ===
Men's

Date	Winners	Score	Opponent	Refs.
6/5/2018	(Argentina) Maxi Sánchez (Argentina) Sanyo Gutiérrez	6–4 / 6–7 / 6–3	(Spain) Juan Martin Díaz (Spain) Paquito Navarro	

Women's

Date	Winners	Score	Opponent	Refs.
6/5/2018	(Spain) Gemma Triay (Spain) Lucía Sainz	5–7 / 7–6 / 6–1	(Spain) Majo Sanchez (Spain) Mapi Sanchez	
