= Padel Pro Tour =

Men's professional padel main circuit

- Sport: Padel
- Abbreviation: PPT
- Founded: 2005; 21 years ago
- Affiliation: FIP
- Affiliation date: 2006
- Regional affiliation: (Spain)
- Headquarters: Madrid
- President: Manuel Hernández
- Closure date: 2012; 14 years ago

Official website
- web.archive.org/web/http://www.padelprotour.com
- Previous Circuit: FEP Circuit; Next Circuit: World Padel Tour

The Padel Pro Tour (PPT) was the most important professional padel circuit in the world during its seven seasons of existence (2006–2012), both for the organizational level of the tournaments and for the participation of the best players internationally.

== History ==
The project, began in 2005 and had its first tournament season in 2006, as a result of an agreement between the group of organizers of Professional Padel Tournaments, the Association of Professional Padel Players (AJPP) and the Spanish Women's Padel Association (AFEP).

The PPT Circuit is managed by the non-profit organization "Padel Pro Tour," which establishes its regulations and guarantees and endorses the quality standards it requires, as well as the prizes awarded to the professional padel players who participate in the circuit's tournaments. This organization is structured through a series of sector committees that set the guidelines for the different areas: planning and strategy, marketing, finance, and technical aspects.

During the 2010 season, 17 tournaments were organized in Spain, plus the Master Final tournament in Madrid. Furthermore, one of the objectives of the Padel Pro Tour was achieved: the internationalization of the circuit. Three tournaments were held in Argentina: two promotional tournaments in Mendoza and San Luis, plus the Mar del Plata International, which kicked off the official season.

On the sporting side, Juan Martín Díaz and Fernando Belasteguín have been firmly established as the number one ranked pair for several years. Juani Mieres and Pablo Lima performed well, climbing to second place and posing a significant threat to Díaz and Belasteguín. In the women's category, the competition was centered between the two best pairs: Carolina Navarro and Cecilia Reiter, and Icíar Montes and Patricia Llaguno. They shared the titles in all the tournaments of the season, with Navarro and Reiter ultimately finishing at the top of the rankings.

In 2011, the organization achieved one of its greatest milestones for the future of the circuit: sponsorship from Bwin, which led to its renaming as the Bwin Padel Pro Tour. The PPT circuit's success contributed to raising the profile of padel as a professional sport through extensive media coverage at the national level.

In 2013, the World Padel Tour began, positioning itself as the leading professional circuit, replacing Padel Pro Tour. This was the result of an agreement between the group of organizers of Professional Padel Tournaments, the Association of Professional Padel Players (AJPP), and the Spanish Women's Padel Association (AFEP).

== Editions ==
| Ed. | Year | Men's 1st ranked pair | | Women's 1st ranked pair |
|---|---|---|---|---|---|
| I | 2006 | (Argentina) Fernando Belasteguín | (Spain) Juan Martín Díaz | (Spain) Iciar Montes | (Brazil) Neki Berwig |
| II | 2007 | (Argentina) Fernando Belasteguín | (Spain) Juan Martín Díaz | (Spain) Iciar Montes | (Brazil) Neki Berwig |
| III | 2008 | (Argentina) Fernando Belasteguín | (Spain) Juan Martín Díaz | (Spain) Carolina Navarro | (Argentina) Catalina Tenorio |
| IV | 2009 | (Argentina) Fernando Belasteguín | (Spain) Juan Martín Díaz | (Spain) Alejandra Salazar | (Spain) Carolina Navarro |
| V | 2010 | (Argentina) Fernando Belasteguín | (Spain) Juan Martín Díaz | (Spain) Carolina Navarro | (Argentina) Cecilia Reitero |
| VI | 2011 | (Argentina) Fernando Belasteguín | (Spain) Juan Martín Díaz | (Spain) Carolina Navarro | (Argentina) Cecilia Reitero |
| VII | 2012 | (Argentina) Fernando Belasteguín | (Spain) Juan Martín Díaz | (Spain) Carolina Navarro | (Argentina) Cecilia Reitero |

== Most PPT tournaments won ==
Male

| Pos. | Player | Wins | Last tournament won |
|---|---|---|---|
| 1st | (Argentina) Fernando Belasteguín | 96 | 06/10/2012 |
| 1st | (Spain) Juan Martín Díaz | 96 | 06/10/2012 |
| 3rd | (Brazil) Pablo Lima | 14 | 16/12/2012 |
| 3rd | (Spain) Juani Mieres | 14 | 16/12/2012 |
| 5th | (Argentina) Sebastian Nerone | 11 | 18/11/2012 |
| 6th | (Argentina) Cristian Gutiérrez | 7 | 27/05/2012 |
| 6th | (Argentina) Gabriel Reca | 7 | 19/06/2011 |
| 6th | (Argentina) Hernan Auguste | 7 | 08/07/2011 |
| 9th | (Argentina) Miguel Lamperti | 6 | 11/11/2012 |
| 10th | (Argentina) Sanyo Gutiérrez | 6 | 18/11/2012 |
| 11th | (Spain) Matías Díaz | 5 | 08/07/2011 |
| 11th | (Argentina) Maxi Grabiel | 5 | 11/11/2012 |
| 13th | (Argentina) Agustín Gomez Silingo | 4 | 15/10/2023 |
| 14th | (Argentina) Fernando Poggi | 1 | 04/01/2012 |

Female

| Pos. | Player | Wins | Last tournament won |
|---|---|---|---|
| 1st | (Spain) Iciar Montes | 32 | 06/10/2012 |
| 2nd | (Spain) Carolina Navarro | 31 | 16/12/2012 |
| 3rd | (Brazil) Neki Berwig | 26 | 21/09/2008 |
| 4th | (Argentina) Cecilia Reiter | 20 | 16/12/2012 |
| 5th | (Argentina) Catalina Tenorio | 9 | 06/10/2012 |
| 6th | (Spain) Alejandra Salazar | 7 | 15/10/2023 |
| 6th | (Spain) Patricia Llaguno | 7 | 04/01/2012 |
| 8th | (Argentina) Valeria Pavon | 2 | 18/10/2009 |
| 9th | (Spain) Elisabet Amatriain | 1 | 04/01/2012 |
| 9th | (Spain) Maria Silvela | 1 | 28/07/2007 |

== See also ==
- International Padel Federation
- World Padel Tour
- Premier Padel
- List of FIP number 1 ranked padel players
- Pádel Pro Tour
