= Manuel Hernández =

Manuel Hernández may refer to:

- Manuel Hernández (motorcycle racer) (born 1984), also known as Manuel Hernández García, Spanish motorcycle road racer
- Manuel Hernandez (soccer) (born 1948), retired Spanish-American soccer forward
- Manuel Hernández (Uruguayan footballer) (born 1970), former Uruguayan footballer
- Manuel Hernández Gómez (1928–2014), Colombian painter
