= 2006 Padel Pro Tour =

Padel Pro Tour 2006
Details
- Duration: 8 May – 3 December
- Edition: 1st
- Tournaments: 17
- Categories: Open (16); Masters (1)

Achievements (singles)
- Most titles: Male (Argentina) Fernando Belasteguín (Argentina) Juan Martín Díaz; Female (Spain) Iciar Montes (Brazil) Neki Berwig
- Most finals: Male (Argentina) Fernando Belasteguín (Argentina) Juan Martín Díaz; Female (Spain) Iciar Montes (Brazil) Neki Berwig

The 2006 Padel Pro Tour was the inaugural edition of the Padel Pro Tour, the most prestigious professional padel circuit in the world. In the first edition of the circuit, the Argentinians Fernando Belasteguín and Juan Martín Díaz were crowned number 1 for the fifth time, after having been the best ranked pair for four years in the Spanish and International circuit. In the female division Iciar Montes and Neki Berwig were the first female pair to be crowned number one in PPT.

== Tournaments and results ==
International Master Final

Tournaments

Tournament	Date	Men's			Women's		
Tournament	Date	Winners	Score	Runners-up	Winners	Score	Runners-up
(Spain) Córdoba International	14 May 2006	(Argentina) Fernando Belasteguín (Spain) Juan Martín Díaz	6–3 / 6–3	(Argentina) Gabriel Reca (Argentina) Sebasian Nerone	(Spain) Iciar Montes (Brazil) Neki Berwig	6–1 / 6–2	(Spain) Maria Silvela (Argentina) Paula Eyheraguibel
(Spain) Majadahonda International	4 June 2006	(Argentina) Fernando Belasteguín (Spain) Juan Martín Díaz	6–0 / 6–0	(Argentina) Gabriel Reca (Argentina) Sebasian Nerone	(Spain) Iciar Montes (Brazil) Neki Berwig	6–3 / 6–1	(Spain) Maria Silvela (Argentina) Paula Eyheraguibel
(Spain) Valencia Internacional	10 June 2006	(Argentina) Fernando Belasteguín (Spain) Juan Martín Díaz	6–4 / 6–3	(Argentina) Gabriel Reca (Argentina) Sebasian Nerone	(Spain) Iciar Montes (Brazil) Neki Berwig	6–4 / 6–3	(Spain) Maria Silvela (Argentina) Paula Eyheraguibel
(Spain) Madrid Internacional	25 June 2006	(Argentina) Fernando Belasteguín (Spain) Juan Martín Díaz	6–1 / 6–4	(Brazil) Marcello Jardim (Argentina) Sebastian Nerone	(Spain) Iciar Montes (Brazil) Neki Berwig	6–1 / 6–1	(Spain) Maria Silvela (Argentina) Paula Eyheraguibel
(Spain) Alicante Internacional	2 July 2006	(Argentina) Fernando Belasteguín (Spain) Juan Martín Díaz	6–3 / 6–4	(Argentina) Gabriel Reca (Argentina) Sebasian Nerone	Not contested		
(Spain) Valladolid Internacional	9 July 2006	(Argentina) Fernando Belasteguín (Spain) Juan Martín Díaz	6–3 / 6–3	(Argentina) Gabriel Reca (Argentina) Sebasian Nerone	(Spain) Iciar Montes (Brazil) Neki Berwig	6–1 / 6–3	(Spain) Maria Silvela (Argentina) Paula Eyheraguibel
(Spain) Marbella Internacional	11 August 2006	(Argentina) Fernando Belasteguín (Spain) Juan Martín Díaz	6–3 / 6–4	(Argentina) Ramiro Nanni (Spain) Raúl Arias	Not contested		
(Spain) Oropesa Del Mar Internacional	15 August 2006	(Argentina) Fernando Belasteguín (Spain) Juan Martín Díaz	7–6 / 6–4	(Argentina) Gabriel Reca (Argentina) Sebasian Nerone	(Spain) Iciar Montes (Brazil) Neki Berwig	6–4 / 0–6 / 6–2	(Sweden) Carolina Navarro (Argentina) Paula Eyheraguibel
(Spain) Ciudad de Fuengirola International	20 August 2006	(Argentina) Fernando Belasteguín (Spain) Juan Martín Díaz	6–4 / 6–0	(Argentina) Gabriel Reca (Argentina) Sebasian Nerone	(Spain) Iciar Montes (Brazil) Neki Berwig	6–0 / 7–5	(Spain) Maria Catalina (Argentina) Valeria Pavon
(Spain) El Puerto de Santa María International	25 August 2006	(Argentina) Fernando Belasteguín (Spain) Juan Martín Díaz	6–3 / 6–2	(Argentina) Gabriel Reca (Argentina) Sebasian Nerone	Not contested		
(Spain) Palma de Mallorca Internacional	3 September 2006	(Argentina) Fernando Belasteguín (Spain) Juan Martín Díaz	6–3 / 7–5 / 6–4	(Argentina) Gabriel Reca (Argentina) Sebasian Nerone	Not contested		
(Spain) Mérida Internacional	17 September 2006	(Argentina) Fernando Belasteguín (Spain) Juan Martín Díaz	6–2 / 6–0	(Brazil) Pablo Lima (Argentina) Roby Gattiker	Not contested		
(Spain) Madrid Internacional II	24 September 2006	(Argentina) Fernando Belasteguín (Spain) Juan Martín Díaz	6–3 / 7–6	(Argentina) Gabriel Reca (Argentina) Sebasian Nerone	(Spain) Iciar Montes (Brazil) Neki Berwig	6–1 / 6–2	(Spain) Maria Silvela (Argentina) Silvana Campus
(Spain) Zaragoza Internacional	1 October 2006	(Argentina) Fernando Belasteguín (Spain) Juan Martín Díaz	7–6 / 6–3	(Argentina) Gabriel Reca (Argentina) Sebasian Nerone	Not contested		
(Spain) Euskadi International	8 October 2006	(Argentina) Fernando Belasteguín (Spain) Juan Martín Díaz	6–3 / 6–4	(Spain) Chema Montes (Spain) Matías Díaz	(Spain) Iciar Montes (Brazil) Neki Berwig	2–3 / W.O.	(Sweden) Carolina Navarro (Argentina) Paula Eyheraguibel
(Spain) Las Palmas International	5 November 2006	(Argentina) Fernando Belasteguín (Spain) Juan Martín Díaz	6–1 / 6–2	(Brazil) Pablo Lima (Argentina) Roby Gattiker	Not contested		
(Spain) Master Final	3 December 2006	(Argentina) Fernando Belasteguín (Spain) Juan Martín Díaz	(Argentina) Gabriel Reca (Argentina) Sebasian Nerone	6–3 / 6–2	Not contested		

== End of season ranking ==
Male

2006 Men's Ranking				Tournaments Won	
N.º	Name	Points	International	Master Final	Total
1	(Argentina) Fernando Belasteguín	2.160	16	1	17
1	Juan Martín Díaz	2.160	16	1	17
3	(Argentina) Gabriel Reca	1.520	0	0	0
3	(Argentina) Sebastian Nerone	1.520	0	0	0
5	(Spain) Gaston Malacalza	1.080	0	0	0
5	(Argentina) Maxi Gabriel	1.080	0	0	0
7	(Spain) José Maria Montes	894	0	0	0
7	(Spain) Matías Díaz	894	0	0	0
9	(Brazil) Pablo Lima	800	0	0	0
9	(Argentina) Roby Gattiker	800	0	0	0
11	(Argentina) Fernando Poggi	675	0	0	0
11	(Spain) Gustavo Vidal	675	0	0	0
13	(Spain) Ramiro Toledo	602	0	0	0
13	(Spain) Raul Arias	602	0	0	0
15	(Argentina) Juan di Carlantonio	540	0	0	0
15	(Argentina) Mariano Lasaigues	540	0	0	0

Female

2006 Women's Ranking				Tournaments Won	
N.º	Name	Points	International	Master Final	Total
1	(Spain) Icair Montes	1.080	9	0	9
1	(Brazil) Lisandre Berwig	1.080	9	0	9
3	(Argentina) Paula Eyheraguibel	780	0	0	0
4	(Spain) Maria Silvela	740	0	0	0
5	(Argentina) Catalna Tenorio	580	0	0	0
5	(Argentina) Valeria Pavon	580	0	0	0
7	(Spain) Alejandra Salazar	450	0	0	0
7	(Spain) Melissa Capra	450	0	0	0
9	(Sweden) Carolina Navarro	395	0	0	0
10	(Argentina) Cecilia Reiter	360	0	0	0
10	(Spain) Mariana Perez	360	0	0	0
12	(Argentina) Silvana Campus	355	0	0	0
13	(Argentina) Araceli Monteri	247	0	0	0
