= 2011 Padel Pro Tour =

Padel Pro Tour 2011
Details
- Duration: 28 March – 18 December
- Edition: 6th
- Tournaments: 19
- Categories: International (18); Masters (1)

Achievements (singles)
- Most titles: Male (Argentina) Fernando Belasteguín (Spain) Juan Martín Díaz (12); Female (Sweden) Carolina Navarro (Argentina) Cecilia Reiter (9)
- Most finals: Male (Argentina) Fernando Belasteguín (Spain) Juan Martín Díaz (13); Female (Sweden) Carolina Navarro (Argentina) Cecilia Reiter (Spain) Iciar Montes (Spain) Patricia Llaguno (11)

The 2011 Padel Pro Tour was the sixth edition of the Padel Pro Tour, the most prestigious professional padel circuit in the world. In the circuit sixth season, the Argentinians Fernando Belasteguín and Juan Martín Díaz retained their status as world number ones, leading the international rankings for the tenth consecutive year. In the women's category, Carolina Navarro and Cecilia Reiter retained the number 1 ranking, for the fourth consecutive year and the eight time in Navarro's career.

== Tournaments and results ==
International Master Final

Tournaments

Tournament	Date	Men's			Women's		
Tournament	Date	Winners	Score	Runners-up	Winners	Score	Runners-up
(Argentina) Mendoza International	3 April 2011	(Spain) Juani Mieres (Brazil) Pablo Lima	6–2 / 7–6	(Argentina) Fernando Belasteguín (Spain) Juan Martín Díaz	Not contested		
(Spain) Tarragona International	15 May 2011	(Spain) Juani Mieres (Brazil) Pablo Lima	6–2 / 6–3	(Argentina) Cristian Gutiérrez (Argentina) Miguel Lamperti	(Sweden) Carolina Navarro (Argentina) Cecilia Reiter	7–6 / 6–2	(Spain) Iciar Montes (Spain) Patricia Llaguno
(Spain) Madrid International	29 May 2011	(Argentina) Fernando Belasteguín (Spain) Juan Martín Díaz	6–3 / 6–3	(Argentina) Cristian Gutiérrez (Argentina) Miguel Lamperti	(Spain) Iciar Montes (Spain) Patricia Llaguno	7–6 / 1–6 / 10–8	(Sweden) Carolina Navarro (Argentina) Cecilia Reiter
(Spain) Barcelona International	5 June 2011	(Argentina) Fernando Belasteguín (Spain) Juan Martín Díaz	6–4 / 6–3	(Spain) Juani Mieres (Brazil) Pablo Lima	(Sweden) Carolina Navarro (Argentina) Cecilia Reiter	6–2 / 4–6 / 10–8	(Spain) Iciar Montes (Spain) Patricia Llaguno
(Spain) Córdoba International	19 June 2011	(Argentina) Agustín Gómez Silingo (Argentina) Gabriel Reca	6–4 / 6–2	(Argentina) Cristian Gutiérrez (Argentina) Miguel Lamperti	Not contested		
(Spain) Valladolid International	3 July 2011	(Argentina) Fernando Belasteguín (Spain) Juan Martín Díaz	6–2 / 6–2	(Argentina) Agustín Gómez Silingo (Argentina) Gabriel Reca	(Sweden) Carolina Navarro (Argentina) Cecilia Reiter	6–1 / 6–4	(Spain) Iciar Montes (Spain) Patricia Llaguno
(Spain) Alicante International	10 July 2011	(Argentina) Fernando Belasteguín (Spain) Juan Martín Díaz	6–1 / 6–1	(Spain) Juani Mieres (Brazil) Pablo Lima	Not contested		
(Spain) Castellón International	24 July 2011	(Argentina) Fernando Belasteguín (Spain) Juan Martín Díaz	6–4 / 6–4	(Argentina) Cristian Gutiérrez (Argentina) Miguel Lamperti	(Sweden) Carolina Navarro (Argentina) Cecilia Reiter	6–3 / 7–6	(Spain) Iciar Montes (Spain) Patricia Llaguno
(Spain) Marbella International	31 July 2011	(Argentina) Fernando Belasteguín (Spain) Juan Martín Díaz	4–6 / 7–6 / 6–3	(Spain) Juani Mieres (Brazil) Pablo Lima	Not contested		
(Spain) Fuengirola International	7 August 2011	(Argentina) Hernan Auguste (Spain) Matías Díaz	6–7 / 6–2 / 7–5	(Argentina) Sanyo Gutiérrez (Argentina) Sebastian Nerone	(Sweden) Carolina Navarro (Argentina) Cecilia Reiter	6–1 / 4–6 / 7–6	(Spain) Iciar Montes (Spain) Patricia Llaguno
(Spain) Gijón International	14 August 2011	(Argentina) Fernando Belasteguín (Spain) Juan Martín Díaz	6–1 / 6–4	(Argentina) Hernan Auguste (Spain) Matías Díaz	(Sweden) Carolina Navarro (Argentina) Cecilia Reiter	6–4 / 6–3	(Spain) Iciar Montes (Spain) Patricia Llaguno
(Spain) Palma De Mallorca International	4 September 2011	(Argentina) Sanyo Gutiérrez (Argentina) Sebastian Nerone	6–4 / 7–6	(Argentina) Hernan Auguste (Spain) Matías Díaz	(Sweden) Carolina Navarro (Argentina) Cecilia Reiter	6–3 / 2–6 / 6–1	(Spain) Iciar Montes (Spain) Patricia Llaguno
(Spain) Seville International	25 September 2011	(Argentina) Fernando Belasteguín (Spain) Juan Martín Díaz	6–3 / 6–4	(Argentina) Cristian Gutiérrez (Argentina) Miguel Lamperti	Not contested		
(Spain) Madrid International II	2 October 2011	(Argentina) Fernando Belasteguín (Spain) Juan Martín Díaz	6–4 / 7–6	(Spain) Juani Mieres (Brazil) Pablo Lima	(Sweden) Carolina Navarro (Argentina) Cecilia Reiter	6–4 / 6–4	(Spain) Iciar Montes (Spain) Patricia Llaguno
(Spain) Euskadi International	9 October 2011	(Argentina) Fernando Belasteguín (Spain) Juan Martín Díaz	6–4 / 6–4	(Spain) Juani Mieres (Brazil) Pablo Lima	(Sweden) Carolina Navarro (Argentina) Cecilia Reiter	5–7 / 6–4 / 6–0	(Spain) Iciar Montes (Spain) Patricia Llaguno
(Spain) Logroño International	6 November 2011	(Argentina) Fernando Belasteguín (Spain) Juan Martín Díaz	7–6 / 6–4	(Spain) Juani Mieres (Brazil) Pablo Lima	Not contested		
(Spain) Euskadi International II	13 November 2011	(Argentina) Fernando Belasteguín (Spain) Juan Martín Díaz	7–6 / 7–5	(Spain) Juani Mieres (Brazil) Pablo Lima	Not contested		
(Spain) Valencia International	27 November 2011	(Spain) Juani Mieres (Brazil) Pablo Lima	5–7 / 6–2 / 6–0	(Argentina) Fernando Poggi (Argentina) Maximiliano Grabiel	Not contested		
(Spain) Master Final	18 December 2011	(Argentina) Fernando Belasteguín (Spain) Juan Martín Díaz	6–3 / 6–3	(Spain) Juani Mieres (Brazil) Pablo Lima	(Spain) Iciar Montes (Spain) Patricia Llaguno	4–6 / 6–2 / 6–1	(Sweden) Carolina Navarro (Argentina) Cecilia Reiter

On some of the women's finals, if each team won a set the match was decided on "Super tie-break"
