= 2013 World Padel Tour =

Padel circut in 2013

Details
- Duration: 8 April – 22 December
- Edition: 1st
- Tournaments: 19
- Categories: Open (18); Masters Finals (1)

Achievements (singles)
- Most titles: Male (Argentina) Fernando Belasteguín (Argentina) Juan Martín Díaz (10); Female (Spain) Carolina Navarro (Argentina) Cecilia Reiter (3)
- Most finals: Male (Argentina) Fernando Belasteguín (Argentina) Juan Martín Díaz (12); Female (Spain) Elisabeth Amatriain (Spain) Patricia Llaguno (6)

The 2013 World Padel Tour was the inaugural edition of the World Padel Tour, the most prestigious professional padel circuit in the world. In its first year, Argentinians Fernando Belasteguín and Juan Martín Díaz were crowned number 1 for the twelfth time, after having been the best ranked pair for seven years in Padel Pro Tour, the former padel circuit. In the female division Elisabeth Amatriain and Patricia Llaguno were the first female pair to be crowned number one in WPT.

== Tournaments and results ==
Open Master Final

Tournament	Date	Men's			Women's		
Tournament	Date	Winners	Score	Runners-up	Winners	Score	Runners-up
(Spain) Murcia Open	8 – 14 April	(Argentina) Fernando Belasteguín (Spain) Juan Martín Díaz	6–3 / 7–6 / 6–3	(Spain) Juani Mieres (Brazil) Pablo Lima	Not contested		
(Spain) Seville Open	6 – 12 May	(Argentina) Fernando Belasteguín (Spain) Juan Martín Díaz	4–6 / 7–6 / 6–4 / 6–3	(Spain) Juani Mieres (Brazil) Pablo Lima	Not contested		
(Spain) Cáceres Open	20 – 26 May	(Argentina) Fernando Belasteguín (Spain) Juan Martín Díaz	6–3 / 6–2 / 6–2	(Argentina) Maxi Sánchez (Argentina) Sanyo Gutiérrez	Not contested		
(Spain) Barcelona Open	3 – 9 June	(Argentina) Fernando Belasteguín (Spain) Juan Martín Díaz	6–1 / 6–4 / 4–6 / 6–3	(Spain) Juani Mieres (Brazil) Pablo Lima	(Spain) Mapi Sánchez Alayeto (Spain) Majo Sánchez Alayeto	6–2 / 7–5	(Spain) Catalina Tenorio (Argentina) Valeria Pavón
(Spain) Madrid Open	16 – 23 June	(Spain) Juani Mieres (Brazil) Pablo Lima	6–7 / 6–0 / 7–6 / 6–4	(Argentina) Fernando Belasteguín (Spain) Juan Martín Díaz	(Spain) Carolina Navarro (Argentina) Cecilia Reiter	3–6 / 7–5 / 6–2	(Spain) Elisabeth Amatriain (Spain) Patricia Llaguno
(Spain) A Coruña Open	24 – 30 June	(Argentina) Cristián Gutiérrez (Spain) Matías Díaz	6–7 / 7–6 / 1–6 / 6–3 / 6–3	(Spain) Juani Mieres (Brazil) Pablo Lima	Not contested		
(Spain) Santander Open	1 – 7 July	(Argentina) Cristián Gutiérrez (Spain) Matías Díaz	7–6 / 6–1 / 7–5	(Spain) Juani Mieres (Brazil) Pablo Lima	(Spain) Elisabeth Amatriain (Spain) Patricia Llaguno	4–6 / 6–3 / 6–2	(Spain) Mapi Sánchez Alayeto (Spain) Majo Sánchez Alayeto
(Spain) El Puerto de Santa María Open	15 – 21 July	(Spain) Juani Mieres (Brazil) Pablo Lima	6–3 / 6–2 / 6–3	(Argentina) Cristián Gutiérrez (Spain) Matías Díaz	Not contested		
(Spain) Málaga Open	29 July – 4 August	(Argentina) Fernando Belasteguín (Spain) Juan Martín Díaz	6–4 / 6–4 / 6–4	(Spain) Juani Mieres (Brazil) Pablo Lima	(Spain) Carolina Navarro (Argentina) Cecilia Reiter	6–2 / 5–7 / 7–6	(Spain) Elisabeth Amatriain (Spain) Patricia Llaguno
(Spain) Castellón Open	12 – 18 August	(Argentina) Fernando Belasteguín (Spain) Juan Martín Díaz	7–5 / 6–1 / 4–6 / 6–4	(Spain) Juani Mieres (Brazil) Pablo Lima	Not contested		
(Spain) Alicante Open	26 August – 1 September	(Argentina) Fernando Belasteguín (Spain) Juan Martín Díaz	6–3 / 6–4 / 6–4	(Argentina) Cristián Gutiérrez (Spain) Matías Díaz	Not contested		
(Spain) Euskadi Open	9 – 15 September	(Argentina) Fernando Belasteguín (Spain) Juan Martín Díaz	4–6 / 6–3 / 7–5 / 6–2	(Spain) Juani Mieres (Brazil) Pablo Lima	(Spain) Elisabeth Amatriain (Spain) Patricia Llaguno	6–1 / 6–4	(Spain) Carolina Navarro (Argentina) Cecilia Reiter
(Spain) Granada Open	23 – 29 September	(Argentina) Fernando Belasteguín (Spain) Juan Martín Díaz	7–6 / 6–4 / 6–3	(Spain) Juani Mieres (Brazil) Pablo Lima	(Spain) Carolina Navarro (Argentina) Cecilia Reiter	6–4 / 7–5	(Spain) Mapi Sánchez Alayeto (Spain) Majo Sánchez Alayeto
Portugal Open	7 – 13 October	(Argentina) Fernando Belasteguín (Spain) Juan Martín Díaz	6–3 / 2–6 / 6–3 / 6–4	(Spain) Juani Mieres (Brazil) Pablo Lima	Not contested		
(Spain) Gran Canaria Open	21 – 27 October	(Spain) Juani Mieres (Brazil) Pablo Lima	6–4 / 6–2 / 6–2	(Argentina) Miguel Lamperti (Argentina) Maxi Grabiel	Not contested		
(Spain) Valencia Open	4 – 10 November	(Argentina) Maxi Sánchez (Argentina) Sanyo Gutiérrez	6–3 / 7–5 / 6–4	(Argentina) Miguel Lamperti (Argentina) Maxi Grabiel	(Spain) Alejandra Salazar (Spain) Icíar Montes	6–1 / 7–6	(Spain) Elisabeth Amatriain (Spain) Patricia Llaguno
(Argentina) Buenos Aires Open	18 – 24 November	(Argentina) Maxi Sánchez (Argentina) Sanyo Gutiérrez	4–6 / 7–6 / 6–2 / 6–3	(Argentina) Cristián Gutiérrez (Spain) Matías Díaz	Not contested		
(Argentina) Villa Carlos Paz Open	2 – 8 December	(Spain) Juani Mieres (Brazil) Pablo Lima	6–7 / 6–1 / 6–2 / WO	(Argentina) Cristián Gutiérrez (Spain) Matías Díaz	Not contested		
(Spain) Master Final	16 – 22 December	(Argentina) Maxi Sánchez (Argentina) Sanyo Gutiérrez	6–7 / 6–1 / 7–6 / WO	(Argentina) Fernando Belasteguín (Spain) Juan Martín Díaz	(Spain) Alejandra Salazar (Spain) Icíar Montes	6–4 / 4–6 / 6–4	(Spain) Elisabeth Amatriain (Spain) Patricia Llaguno

== End of season ranking ==
Male

2013 Men's Ranking			Tournaments Won		
N.º	Name	Points	Open	Master Final	Total
1	(Argentina) Fernando Belasteguín	7.453	10	0	10
1	(Spain) Juan Martín Díaz	7.453	10	0	10
3	(Brazil) Pablo Lima	5.856	4	0	4
4	(Spain) Juani Mieres	5.847	4	0	4
5	(Argentina) Sanyo Gutiérrez	4.350	2	0	2
6	(Spain) Matías Díaz	4.200	2	0	2
7	(Argentina) Cristián Gutiérrez	4.059	2	0	2
8	(Argentina) Maxi Sánchez	3.817	2	0	2
9	(Argentina) Maxi Grabiel	2.967	0	0	0
9	(Argentina) Miguel Lamperti	2.967	0	0	0
11	(Argentina) Seba Nerone	2.478	0	0	0
12	(Argentina) Gabriel Reca	2.022	0	0	0
13	(Spain) Paquito Navarro	1.844	0	0	0
14	(Spain) Jordi Muñoz	1.767	0	0	0
15	(Argentina) Adrián Allemandi	1.489	0	0	0
15	(Argentina) Fernando Poggi	1.489	0	0	0

Female

2013 Women's Ranking			Tournaments Won		
N.º	Name	Points	Open	Master Final	Total
1	(Spain) Elisabeth Amatriain	6.200	2	0	2
1	(Spain) Patricia Llaguno	6.200	2	0	2
3	(Spain) Carolina Navarro	6.171	3	0	3
3	(Argentina) Cecilia Reiter	6.171	3	0	3
5	(Spain) Majo Sánchez Alayeto	4.943	1	0	1
5	(Spain) Mapi Sánchez Alayeto	4.943	1	0	1
7	(Spain) Alejandra Salazar	4.067	1	1	2
8	(Spain) Icíar Montes	4.000	1	1	2
9	(Argentina) Catalina Tenorio	3.429	0	0	0
9	(Argentina) Valeria Pavón	3.429	0	0	0
11	(Spain) Marta Marrero	1.671	0	0	0
11	(Argentina) Nelida Brito	1.671	0	0	0
13	(Argentina) Paula Eyheraguibel	1.543	0	0	0
14	(Spain) Ana Fernández	1.414	0	0	0
14	(Spain) Lucía Sainz	1.414	0	0	0
14	(Spain) Marta Ortega	1.414	0	0	0
14	(Brazil) Michele Treptow	1.414	0	0	0
