= 2009 Padel Pro Tour =

Padel Pro Tour 2009
Details
- Duration: 11 May – 13 December
- Edition: 4th
- Tournaments: 21
- Categories: International (20); Masters (1)

Achievements (singles)
- Most titles: Male (Argentina) Fernando Belasteguín (Spain) Juan Martín Díaz (11); Female (Spain) Alejandra Salazar (Sweden) Carolina Navarro (6)
- Most finals: Male (Argentina) Fernando Belasteguín (Spain) Juan Martín Díaz (13); Female (Spain) Alejandra Salazar (Sweden) Carolina Navarro (7)

The 2009 Padel Pro Tour was the fourth edition of the Padel Pro Tour, the most prestigious professional padel circuit in the world. In the fourth edition of the circuit, the Argentinians Fernando Belasteguín and Juan Martín Díaz were crowned number 1 for the a fourth time, topping the international ranking for the eight consecutive year. In the female division Carolina Navarro remained the world number one in PPT, this time with first timer Alejandra Salazar.

== Tournaments and results ==
International Master Final

Tournaments

| Tournament | Date | Men's | | | Women's | | |
| Tournament | Date | Winners | Score | Runners-up | Winners | Score | Runners-up |
|---|---|---|---|---|---|---|---|
| (Spain) Granada International | 17 May 2009 | (Spain) Matías Díaz (Argentina) Miguel Lamperti | 3–6 / 6–4 / 6–2 | (Argentina) Gabriel Reca (Argentina) Hernan Auguste | Not contested | | |
| (Spain) Majadahonda International | 31 May 2009 | (Spain) Juani Mieres (Brazil) Pablo Lima | 6–4 / 6–0 | (Argentina) Cristian Gutiérrez (Argentina) Sebastian Nerone | Not contested | | |
| (Spain) Barcelona International | 14 June 2009 | (Argentina) Fernando Belasteguín (Spain) Juan Martín Díaz | 6–4 / 6–2 | (Argentina) Gabriel Reca (Argentina) Hernan Auguste | (Spain) Alejandra Salazar (Sweden) Carolina Navarro | 6–3 / 4–6 / 6–3 | (Argentina) Catalina Tenorio (Argentina) Valeria Pavon |
| (Spain) Córdoba International | 28 June 2009 | (Argentina) Fernando Belasteguín (Spain) Juan Martín Díaz | 7–6 / 7–5 | (Spain) Matías Díaz (Argentina) Miguel Lamperti | Not contested | | |
| (Spain) Valladolid International | 5 July 2009 | (Argentina) Fernando Belasteguín (Spain) Juan Martín Díaz | 6–2 / 7–5 | (Argentina) Gabriel Reca (Argentina) Hernan Auguste | (Spain) Alejandra Salazar (Sweden) Carolina Navarro | 6–1 / 6–4 | (Argentina) Cecilia Reiter (Spain) Patricia Llaguno |
| (Spain) Alicante International | 12 July 2009 | (Argentina) Fernando Belasteguín (Spain) Juan Martín Díaz | 6–2 / 7–6 | (Spain) Juani Mieres (Brazil) Pablo Lima | Not contested | | |
| (Spain) Madrid International | 20 July 2009 | (Argentina) Cristian Gutiérrez (Argentina) Sebastian Nerone | 6–4 / 6–3 | (Spain) Juani Mieres (Brazil) Pablo Lima | (Spain) Alejandra Salazar (Sweden) Carolina Navarro | 6–2 / 2–6 / 6–2 | (Argentina) Cecilia Reiter (Spain) Patricia Llaguno |
| (Spain) Marbella International | 2 August 2009 | (Argentina) Fernando Belasteguín (Spain) Juan Martín Díaz | 6–3 / 6–4 | (Argentina) Cristian Gutiérrez (Argentina) Sebastian Nerone | Not contested | | |
| (Spain) Fuengirola International | 9 August 2009 | (Argentina) Cristian Gutiérrez (Argentina) Sebastian Nerone | 7–5 / 4–6 / 6–4 | (Argentina) Fernando Belasteguín (Spain) Juan Martín Díaz | (Spain) Alejandra Salazar (Sweden) Carolina Navarro | 6–3 / 6–3 | (Argentina) Catalina Tenorio (Argentina) Valeria Pavon |
| (Spain) Oropesa Del Mar International | 17 August 2009 | (Argentina) Gabriel Reca (Argentina) Hernan Auguste | 6–2 / 6–3 | (Argentina) Cristian Gutiérrez (Argentina) Sebastian Nerone | Not contested | | |
| (Spain) Palma De Mallorca International | 6 September 2009 | (Argentina) Cristian Gutiérrez (Argentina) Sebastian Nerone | 6–3 / 1–6 / 7–6 | (Spain) Matías Díaz (Argentina) Miguel Lamperti | (Spain) Alejandra Salazar (Sweden) Carolina Navarro | 6–3 / 6–4 | (Argentina) Catalina Tenorio (Argentina) Valeria Pavon |
| (Spain) Seville International | 13 September 2009 | (Argentina) Gabriel Reca (Argentina) Hernan Auguste | 6–1 / 2–6 / 6–4 | (Spain) Matías Díaz (Argentina) Miguel Lamperti | Not contested | | |
| (Spain) Euskadi International | 20 September 2009 | (Argentina) Fernando Belasteguín (Spain) Juan Martín Díaz | 6–2 / 6–2 | (Spain) Juani Mieres (Brazil) Pablo Lima | (Argentina) Cecilia Reiter (Spain) Patricia Llaguno | 6–3 / 6–4 | (Argentina) Catalina Tenorio (Argentina) Valeria Pavon |
| (Spain) Zaragoza International | 27 September 2009 | (Argentina) Fernando Belasteguín (Spain) Juan Martín Díaz | 6–1 / 6–3 | (Argentina) Cristian Gutiérrez (Argentina) Sebastian Nerone | Not contested | | |
| (Spain) Euskadi International II] | 4 October 2009 | (Argentina) Fernando Belasteguín (Spain) Juan Martín Díaz | 4–6 / 6–4 / 6–2 | (Spain) Matías Díaz (Argentina) Miguel Lamperti | (Argentina) Catalina Tenorio (Argentina) Valeria Pavon | 6–3 / 4–6 / 6–4 | (Spain) Alejandra Salazar (Sweden) Carolina Navarro |
| (Spain) Valencia International | 18 October 2009 | (Argentina) Fernando Belasteguín (Spain) Juan Martín Díaz | 6–2 / 6–1 | (Argentina) Cristian Gutiérrez (Argentina) Sebastian Nerone | (Argentina) Catalina Tenorio (Argentina) Valeria Pavon | 6–4 / 6–3 | (Argentina) Cecilia Reiter (Spain) Patricia Llaguno |
| (Spain) Ciudad Real International | 25 October 2009 | (Argentina) Fernando Belasteguín (Spain) Juan Martín Díaz | 7–6 / 7–5 | (Argentina) Cristian Gutiérrez (Argentina) Sebastian Nerone | Not contested | | |
| (Spain) La Rioja International | 8 November 2009 | (Spain) Juani Mieres (Brazil) Pablo Lima | 6–4 / 6–3 | (Argentina) Gabriel Reca (Argentina) Hernan Auguste | Not contested | | |
| (Spain) La Coruña International | 15 November 2009 | (Spain) Matías Díaz (Argentina) Miguel Lamperti | 6–3 / 5–7 / 6–4 | (Argentina) Gabriel Reca (Argentina) Hernan Auguste | Not contested | | |
| (Spain) Salamanca International | 29 November 2009 | (Spain) Juani Mieres (Brazil) Pablo Lima | 6–4 / 7–5 | (Argentina) Fernando Belasteguín (Spain) Juan Martín Díaz | Not contested | | |
| (Spain) PPT Master Final | 13 December 2009 | (Argentina) Fernando Belasteguín (Spain) Juan Martín Díaz | 6–4 / 6–2 | (Spain) Juani Mieres (Brazil) Pablo Lima | (Spain) Alejandra Salazar (Sweden) Carolina Navarro | 4–6 / 6–3 / 6–4 | (Argentina) Catalina Tenorio (Argentina) Valeria Pavon |
