= 2010 Padel Pro Tour =

Padel Pro Tour 2010
Details
- Duration: 19 February – 19 December
- Edition: 5th
- Tournaments: 21
- Categories: International (20); Masters (1)

Achievements (singles)
- Most titles: Male (Argentina) Fernando Belasteguín (Spain) Juan Martín Díaz (12); Female (Sweden) Carolina Navarro (Argentina) Cecilia Reiter (5)
- Most finals: Male (Spain) Juan Martín Díaz (13); Female (Spain) Iciar Montes (Spain) Patricia Llaguno (9)

The 2010 Padel Pro Tour was the fifth edition of the Padel Pro Tour, the most prestigious professional padel circuit in the world. In the circuit fifth season, the Argentinians Fernando Belasteguín and Juan Martín Díaz retained their status as world number ones, leading the international rankings for the ninth consecutive year.. In the women's category, Carolina Navarro also retained the number 1 ranking, for the third consecutive year and the seventh time in her career, alongside her fourth partner with whom she achieved this feat, Cecilia Reiter, who was holding the top spot for the first time.

== Tournaments and results ==
International Master Final

Tournaments

Tournament	Date	Men's			Women's		
Tournament	Date	Winners	Score	Runners-up	Winners	Score	Runners-up
(Argentina) Mendoza International	22 February 2010	(Argentina) Agustín Gómez Silingo (Argentina) Maxi Grabiel	6–3 6–4	(Argentina) Miguel Lamperti (Argentina) Sanyo Gutiérrez	Not contested		
(Argentina) San Luis International	7 March 2010	(Argentina) Cristian Gutiérrez (Argentina) Sanyo Gutiérrez	0–6 / 6–3 / 7–5	(Spain) Juan Martín Díaz (Argentina) Roby Gattiker	Not contested		
(Argentina) Mar De Plata International	14 March 2010	(Spain) Matías Díaz (Argentina) Miguel Lamperti	7–5 / 4–6 / 7–5	(Spain) Juani Mieres (Brazil) Pablo Lima	Not contested		
(Spain) Ciudad Real International	2 May 2010	(Spain) Juani Mieres (Brazil) Pablo Lima	6–3 / 7–5	(Argentina) Gabriel Reca (Argentina) Hernan Auguste	Not contested		
(Spain) Euskadi International	16 May 2010	(Argentina) Fernando Belasteguín (Spain) Juan Martín Díaz	6–3 / 6–1	(Spain) Matías Díaz (Argentina) Miguel Lamperti	(Sweden) Carolina Navarro (Argentina) Cecilia Reiter	6–3 / 7–6	(Spain) Iciar Montes (Spain) Patricia Llaguno
(Spain) Madrid International	30 May 2010	(Argentina) Agustín Gómez Silingo (Argentina) Maxi Grabiel	3–6 / 6–3 / 6–4	(Spain) Juani Mieres (Brazil) Pablo Lima	Not contested		
(Spain) Barcelona International	5 June 2010	(Argentina) Fernando Belasteguín (Spain) Juan Martín Díaz	6–2 / 6–3	(Argentina) Gabriel Reca (Argentina) Hernan Auguste	(Spain) Iciar Montes (Spain) Patricia Llaguno	6–4 / 3–6 / 6–3	(Spain) Alejandra Salazar (Argentina) Valeria Pavon
(Spain) Córdoba International	20 June 2010	(Spain) Juani Mieres (Brazil) Pablo Lima	6–7 / 6–2 / 6–2	(Spain) Matías Díaz (Argentina) Miguel Lamperti	Not contested		
(Spain) Valladolid International	4 July 2010	(Spain) Juani Mieres (Brazil) Pablo Lima	6–3 / 6–2	(Argentina) Gabriel Reca (Argentina) Hernan Auguste	(Spain) Iciar Montes (Spain) Patricia Llaguno	7–5 / 0–6 / 6–4	(Sweden) Carolina Navarro (Argentina) Cecilia Reiter
(Spain) Alicante International	11 July 2010	(Argentina) Fernando Belasteguín (Spain) Juan Martín Díaz	6–3 / W.O.	(Spain) Matías Díaz (Argentina) Miguel Lamperti	Not contested		
(Spain) Madrid International II	18 July 2010	(Argentina) Fernando Belasteguín (Spain) Juan Martín Díaz	7–5 / 6–2	(Spain) Juani Mieres (Brazil) Pablo Lima	(Spain) Iciar Montes (Spain) Patricia Llaguno	6–4 / 6–0	(Spain) Alejandra Salazar (Argentina) Valeria Pavon
(Spain) Castellón International	25 July 2010	(Argentina) Fernando Belasteguín (Spain) Juan Martín Díaz	6–3 / 7–5	(Spain) Juani Mieres (Brazil) Pablo Lima	(Sweden) Carolina Navarro (Argentina) Cecilia Reiter	6–3 / 6–0	(Spain) Iciar Montes (Spain) Patricia Llaguno
(Spain) Marbella International	1 August 2010	(Argentina) Fernando Belasteguín (Spain) Juan Martín Díaz	6–2 / 6–3	(Spain) Matías Díaz (Argentina) Miguel Lamperti	Not contested		
(Spain) Fuengirola International	8 August 2010	(Argentina) Fernando Belasteguín (Spain) Juan Martín Díaz	6–3 / 6–4	(Spain) Juani Mieres (Brazil) Pablo Lima	(Sweden) Carolina Navarro (Argentina) Cecilia Reiter	7–6 / 4–6 / 6–3	(Spain) Iciar Montes (Spain) Patricia Llaguno
(Spain) Palma De Mallorca International	5 September 2010	(Spain) Matías Díaz (Argentina) Miguel Lamperti	7–5 / 6–0	(Brazil) Chico Gomes (Argentina) Federico Quiles	Not contested		
(Spain) Seville International	19 September 2010	(Spain) Juani Mieres (Brazil) Pablo Lima	6–2 / 6–3	(Argentina) Fernando Belasteguín (Spain) Juan Martín Díaz	Not contested		
(Spain) Pamplona International	26 September 2010	(Argentina) Fernando Belasteguín (Spain) Juan Martín Díaz	6–4 / 6–7 / 6–1	(Spain) Juani Mieres (Brazil) Pablo Lima	(Sweden) Carolina Navarro (Argentina) Cecilia Reiter	6–1 / 6–2	(Spain) Iciar Montes (Spain) Patricia Llaguno
(Spain) Euskadi International	3 October 2010	(Argentina) Fernando Belasteguín (Spain) Juan Martín Díaz	6–3 / 6–4	(Spain) Juani Mieres (Brazil) Pablo Lima	(Sweden) Carolina Navarro (Argentina) Cecilia Reiter	3–6 / 6–3 / 6–4	(Spain) Iciar Montes (Spain) Patricia Llaguno
(Spain) Murcia International	24 October 2010	(Argentina) Fernando Belasteguín (Spain) Juan Martín Díaz	3–6 / 6–4 / 6–4	(Spain) Juani Mieres (Brazil) Pablo Lima	Not contested		
(Spain) La Rioja International	7 November 2010	(Argentina) Fernando Belasteguín (Spain) Juan Martín Díaz	7–6 / 6–7 / 6–3	(Spain) Juani Mieres (Brazil) Pablo Lima	Not contested		
(Spain) Master Final	19 December 2010	(Argentina) Fernando Belasteguín (Spain) Juan Martín Díaz	6–3 / 6–4	(Spain) Juani Mieres (Brazil) Pablo Lima	(Spain) Iciar Montes (Spain) Patricia Llaguno	6–4 / 7–5	(Argentina) Paula Eyheraguibel (Argentina) Silvana Campus
