= Manuel Hernández (Uruguayan footballer) =

Uruguayan footballer (born 1970)

Personal information
- Full name: Manuel Hernández
- Date of birth: 4 April 1970 (age 56)
- Place of birth: Uruguay

Senior career*
Years	Team	Apps	(Gls)
1989–1995	Huracán Buceo		
1996–1997	Colón		
1998	Juventud de Las Piedras		
1999	Basañez		
2000	Villa Española		
2000	Provincial Osorno		
2001	Central Español		
2002	El Tanque Sisley		
2003	Rentistas		
- * Club domestic league appearances and goals

Manuel Hernández (born 4 April 1970) is a Uruguayan former professional footballer who played for clubs of Uruguay and Chile.

== Career ==
- Huracán Buceo 1989–1995
- Colón 1996–1997
- Juventud Las Piedras 1998
- Basañez 1999
- Villa Española 2000
- Provincial Osorno 2000
- Central Español 2001
- El Tanque Sisley 2002
- Rentistas 2003
