= 2007 Padel Pro Tour =

Padel Pro Tour 2007
Details
- Duration: 3 May – 16 December
- Edition: 2nd
- Tournaments: 21
- Categories: International (20); Masters (1)

Achievements (singles)
- Most titles: Male (Argentina) Fernando Belasteguín (Spain) Juan Martín Díaz (18); Female (Spain) Iciar Montes (Brazil) Neki Berwig (11)
- Most finals: Male (Argentina) Fernando Belasteguín (Spain) Juan Martín Díaz (18); Female (Spain) Iciar Montes (Brazil) Neki Berwig (12)

The 2007 Padel Pro Tour was the second edition of the Padel Pro Tour, the most prestigious professional padel circuit in the world. In the second edition of the circuit, the Argentinians Fernando Belasteguín and Juan Martín Díaz were crowned number 1 for the second time, topping the international ranking for the sixth consecutive year. In the female division Iciar Montes and Neki Berwig were crowned number one in PPT for a second time.

== Tournaments and results ==
International Master Final

Tournaments

Tournament	Date	Men's			Women's		
Tournament	Date	Winners	Score	Runners-up	Winners	Score	Runners-up
(Spain) Córdoba International	6 May 2007	(Argentina) Fernando Belasteguín (Spain) Juan Martín Díaz	6–1 / 6–3	(Argentina) Cristian Gutiérrez (Argentina) Sebastian Nerone	(Spain) Iciar Montes (Brazil) Neki Berwig	6–2 / 7–5	(Spain) Alejandra Salazar (Spain) Maria Silvela
(Spain) Catalunya International	20 May 2007	(Argentina) Fernando Belasteguín (Spain) Juan Martín Díaz	6–3 / 7–5	(Argentina) Cristian Gutiérrez (Argentina) Sebastian Nerone	(Spain) Iciar Montes (Brazil) Neki Berwig	6–1 / 6–4	(Sweden) Carolina Navarro (Argentina) Paula Eyheraguibel
(Spain) Madrid International	2 June 2007	(Argentina) Fernando Belasteguín (Spain) Juan Martín Díaz	6–3 / 6–2	(Argentina) Alejandro Lasaigues (Argentina) Miguel Lamperti	(Spain) Iciar Montes (Brazil) Neki Berwig	6–3 / 7–6	(Sweden) Carolina Navarro (Argentina) Paula Eyheraguibel
(Spain) Valladolid International	10 June 2007	(Argentina) Cristian Gutiérrez (Argentina) Sebastian Nerone	6–4 / 6–3	(Argentina) Federico Pérez (Argentina) Gerardo Derito	(Spain) Iciar Montes (Brazil) Neki Berwig	6–4 / 2–6 / 6–1	(Spain) Alejandra Salazar (Spain) Maria Silvela
(Spain) Valencia International	17 June 2007	(Argentina) Fernando Belasteguín (Spain) Juan Martín Díaz	6–3 / 2–6 / 6–4	(Argentina) Cristian Gutiérrez (Argentina) Sebastian Nerone	(Spain) Iciar Montes (Brazil) Neki Berwig	4–6 / 6–4 / 6–4	(Sweden) Carolina Navarro (Argentina) Paula Eyheraguibel
(Spain) Euskadi International	8 July 2007	(Argentina) Fernando Belasteguín (Spain) Juan Martín Díaz	7–6 / 6–4	(Argentina) Cristian Gutiérrez (Argentina) Sebastian Nerone	Not contested		
(Spain) Madrid International II	28 July 2007	(Argentina) Fernando Belasteguín (Spain) Juan Martín Díaz	6–4 / 7–6	(Argentina) Cristian Gutiérrez (Argentina) Sebastian Nerone	(Spain) Alejandra Salazar (Spain) Maria Silvela	2–6 / 6–4 / 6–3	(Spain) Iciar Montes (Brazil) Neki Berwig
(Spain) Oropesa Del Mar International	5 August 2007	(Argentina) Fernando Belasteguín (Spain) Juan Martín Díaz	6–2 / 5–2 / WO	(Argentina) Cristian Gutiérrez (Argentina) Sebastian Nerone	(Spain) Iciar Montes (Brazil) Neki Berwig	6–4 / 6–4	(Sweden) Carolina Navarro (Argentina) Paula Eyheraguibel
(Spain) Marbella International	11 August 2007	(Argentina) Fernando Belasteguín (Spain) Juan Martín Díaz	WO	(Argentina) Cristian Gutiérrez (Argentina) Sebastian Nerone	Not contested		
(Spain) Fuengirola International	19 August 2007	(Argentina) Fernando Belasteguín (Spain) Juan Martín Díaz	6–4 / 6–2	(Argentina) Gabriel Reca (Argentina) Hernan Auguste	(Spain) Iciar Montes (Brazil) Neki Berwig	6–2 / 6–3	(Spain) Maria Catalina (Argentina) Valeria Pavon
(Spain) El Puerto de Santa María International	24 August 2007	(Argentina) Fernando Belasteguín (Spain) Juan Martín Díaz	7–5 / 6–4	(Argentina) Gabriel Reca (Argentina) Hernan Auguste	(Spain) Iciar Montes (Brazil) Neki Berwig	6–3 / 6–3	(Sweden) Carolina Navarro (Argentina) Paula Eyheraguibel
(Spain) Palma de Mallorca International	2 September 2007	(Argentina) Fernando Belasteguín (Spain) Juan Martín Díaz	6–3 / 5–7 / 6–3	(Argentina) Gabriel Reca (Argentina) Hernan Auguste	Not contested		
(Spain) Mérida International	16 September 2007	(Argentina) Fernando Belasteguín (Spain) Juan Martín Díaz	6–1 / 6–2	(Spain) Matías Díaz (Argentina) Miguel Lamperti	Not contested		
(Spain) Euskadi International II	23 September 2007	(Argentina) Fernando Belasteguín (Spain) Juan Martín Díaz	7–5 / 6–1	(Argentina) Cristian Gutiérrez (Argentina) Sebastian Nerone	(Spain) Iciar Montes (Brazil) Neki Berwig	6–1 / 6–4	(Sweden) Carolina Navarro (Argentina) Paula Eyheraguibel
(Spain) Zaragoza International	30 September 2007	(Argentina) Fernando Belasteguín (Spain) Juan Martín Díaz	6–3 / 6–3	(Spain) Matías Díaz (Argentina) Miguel Lamperti	Not contested		
(Spain) Euskadi International III	7 October 2007	(Argentina) Fernando Belasteguín (Spain) Juan Martín Díaz	6–2 / 7–5	(Argentina) Cristian Gutiérrez (Argentina) Sebastian Nerone	(Spain) Iciar Montes (Brazil) Neki Berwig	6–0 / 7–5	(Sweden) Carolina Navarro (Argentina) Paula Eyheraguibel
(Spain) Seville International	14 October 2007	(Argentina) Gabriel Reca (Argentina) Hernan Auguste	6–4 / 6–2	(Argentina) Cristian Gutiérrez (Argentina) Sebastian Nerone	(Spain) Iciar Montes (Brazil) Neki Berwig	6–4 / 6–2	(Sweden) Carolina Navarro (Argentina) Paula Eyheraguibel
(Spain) La Rioja International	21 October 2007	(Argentina) Gabriel Reca (Argentina) Hernan Auguste	6–2 / 3–6 / 6–3	(Argentina) Cristian Gutiérrez (Argentina) Sebastian Nerone	Not contested		
(Spain) Las Palmas International	28 October 2007	(Argentina) Fernando Belasteguín (Spain) Juan Martín Díaz	6–3 / 6–1	(Argentina) Cristian Gutiérrez (Argentina) Sebastian Nerone	Not contested		
(Spain) Alicante International	4 November 2007	(Argentina) Fernando Belasteguín (Spain) Juan Martín Díaz		(Argentina) Gabriel Reca (Argentina) Hernan Auguste	Not contested		
(Spain) Master Final	16 December 2007	(Argentina) Fernando Belasteguín (Spain) Juan Martín Díaz	6–2 / 7–6	(Argentina) Gabriel Reca (Argentina) Hernan Auguste	(Spain) Iciar Montes (Brazil) Neki Berwig	6–3 / 5–7 / 6–4	(Sweden) Carolina Navarro (Argentina) Paula Eyheraguibel

== End of season ranking ==
Male

2007 Men's Ranking				Tournaments Won	
N.º	Name	Points	International	Master Final	Total
1	(Argentina) Fernando Belasteguín	2.880	17	1	18
1	Juan Martín Díaz	2.880	17	1	18
3	(Argentina) Cristian Gutiérrez	2.010	1	0	1
3	(Argentina) Sebastian Nerone	2.010	1	0	1
5	(Argentina) Gabriel Reca	1.465	2	0	2
5	(Argentina) Hernan Auguste	1.465	2	0	2
7	(Spain) Gaston Malacalza	1.215	0	0	0
7	(Argentina) Maxi Gabriel	1.215	0	0	0
9	(Argentina) Miguel Lamperti	995	0	0	0
10	(Spain) Matías Díaz	956	0	0	0
11	(Brazil) Marcello Jardim	807	0	0	0
12	(Argentina) Mariano Lasaigues	803	0	0	0
13	(Spain) Raul Arias	796	0	0	0
14	(Brazil) Pablo Lima	765	0	0	0
14	(Argentina) Roby Gattiker	765	0	0	0
16	(Spain) José Maria Montes	764	0	0	0

Female

2007 Women's Ranking				Tournaments Won	
N.º	Name	Points	International	Master Final	Total
1	(Spain) Icair Montes	1.800	11	0	11
1	(Brazil) Lisandre Berwig	1.800	11	0	11
3	(Argentina) Paula Eyheraguibel	1.220	0	0	0
3	(Sweden) Carolina Navarro	1.220	0	0	0
5	(Spain) Alejandra Salazar	1.070	1	0	1
5	(Spain) Maria Silvela	1.070	1	0	1
7	(Argentina) Catalina Tenorio	940	0	0	0
7	(Argentina) Valeria Pavon	940	0	0	0
9.	(Spain) Maria Wakinogg Figueras	450	0	0	0
10.	(Argentina) Araceli Monteri	427	0	0	0
11.	(Argentina) Cecilia Reiter	404	0	0	0
12.	(Argentina) Daniela Banchero	359	0	0	0
13.	(Spain) Eva Orpinell	358	0	0	0
14.	(Spain) Vanessa Zamora	336	0	0	0
15.	(Argentina) Melissa Perren	335	0	0	0
16.	(Spain) Almudena Marchena Asín	312	0	0	0
