= 2012 Padel Pro Tour =

Padel Pro Tour 2012
Details
- Duration: 13 February – 16 December
- Edition: 7th
- Tournaments: 20
- Categories: International (18); Master (1); Master Final (1)

Achievements (singles)
- Most titles: Male (Argentina) Fernando Belasteguín (Spain) Juan Martín Díaz (9); Female (Sweden) Carolina Navarro (Argentina) Cecilia Reiter (6)
- Most finals: Male (Argentina) Fernando Belasteguín (Spain) Juan Martín Díaz (11); Female (Sweden) Carolina Navarro (Argentina) Cecilia Reiter (7)

The 2012 Padel Pro Tour was the seventh edition of the Padel Pro Tour, the most prestigious professional padel circuit in the world. In the circuit seventh and final year, the Argentinians Fernando Belasteguín and Juan Martín Díaz retained their status as world number ones, leading the international rankings for the eleventh consecutive year. In the women's category, Carolina Navarro and Cecilia Reiter retained the number 1 ranking for the third consecutive year, marking the fifth consecutive year and the nine time in Navarro's career.

== Tournaments and results ==
International Master Master Final

Tournament	Date	Men's			Women's		
Tournament	Date	Winners	Score	Runners-up	Winners	Score	Runners-up
(Argentina) Mendoza International	19 February 2012	(Argentina) Maximiliano Grabiel (Argentina) Miguel Lamperti	7–6 / 2–6 / 6–3	(Argentina) Fernando Belasteguín (Spain) Juan Martín Díaz	Not contested		
(Argentina) Buenos Aires International	26 February 2012	(Argentina) Fernando Belasteguín (Spain) Juan Martín Díaz	6–4 / 6–3	(Spain) Juani Mieres (Brazil) Pablo Lima	Not contested		
(Spain) FIP-PPT Pairs World Cup	1 April 2012	(Argentina) Cristian Gutiérrez (Argentina) Fernando Poggi	6–2 / 6–7 / 6–3	(Spain) Juani Mieres (Brazil) Pablo Lima	(Spain) Elisabet Amatriain (Spain) Patricia Llaguno	6–1 / 6–4	(Spain) Carolina Gago Fuenes (Argentina) Paula Eyheraguibel
(Spain) Madrid International	27 May 2012	(Argentina) Fernando Belasteguín (Spain) Juan Martín Díaz	7–5 / 6–1	(Argentina) Cristian Gutiérrez (Argentina) Fernando Poggi	Not contested		
(Spain) Barcelona International	10 June 2012	(Argentina) Fernando Belasteguín (Spain) Juan Martín Díaz	6–2 / 6–3	(Spain) Juani Mieres (Brazil) Pablo Lima	(Argentina) Catalina Tenorio (Spain) Iciar Montes	7–6 / 7–5	(Sweden) Carolina Navarro (Argentina) Cecilia Reiter
(Spain) Córdoba International	17 June 2012	(Argentina) Fernando Belasteguín (Spain) Juan Martín Díaz	6–4 / 7–6	(Spain) Juani Mieres (Brazil) Pablo Lima	Not contested		
(Spain) Valladolid International	1 July 2012	(Argentina) Fernando Belasteguín (Spain) Juan Martín Díaz	6–4 / 6–3	(Argentina) Adrian Allemandi (Spain) Paquito Navarro	(Sweden) Carolina Navarro (Argentina) Cecilia Reiter	6–2 / 6–1	(Argentina) Catalina Tenorio (Spain) Iciar Montes
(Spain) Alicante International	15 July 2012	(Argentina) Sanyo Gutiérrez (Argentina) Sebastian Nerone	7–6 / 6–4	(Spain) Juani Mieres (Brazil) Pablo Lima	Not contested		
(Spain) Marbella International	29 July 2012	(Spain) Juani Mieres (Brazil) Pablo Lima	4–6 / 6–3 / 6–1	(Argentina) Maximiliano Grabiel (Argentina) Miguel Lamperti	Not contested		
(Spain) Fuengirola International	5 August 2012	(Argentina) Fernando Belasteguín (Spain) Juan Martín Díaz	7–5 / 7–6	(Spain) Juani Mieres (Brazil) Pablo Lima	Not contested		
(Spain) Gijón International	19 August 2012	(Argentina) Sanyo Gutiérrez (Argentina) Sebastian Nerone	4–6 / 7–6 / 6–3	(Argentina) Fernando Belasteguín (Spain) Juan Martín Díaz	(Sweden) Carolina Navarro (Argentina) Cecilia Reiter	6–2 / 6–1	(Argentina) Catalina Tenorio (Spain) Iciar Montes
(Spain) Palma De Mallorca International	2 September 2012	(Argentina) Fernando Belasteguín (Spain) Juan Martín Díaz	6–3 / 6–4	(Spain) Juani Mieres (Brazil) Pablo Lima	Not contested		
(Spain) Ibiza International	9 September 2012	(Argentina) Fernando Belasteguín (Spain) Juan Martín Díaz	2–6 / 6–3 / 6–4	(Spain) Juani Mieres (Brazil) Pablo Lima	Not contested		
(Mexico) Acapulco Master	16 September 2012	(Spain) Juani Mieres (Brazil) Pablo Lima	6–1 / 4–0 / W.O.	(Argentina) Agustín Gómez Silingo (Argentina) Gabriel Reca	Not contested		
(Spain) Madrid International II	30 September 2012	(Argentina) Fernando Belasteguín (Spain) Juan Martín Díaz	7–5 / 6–3	(Argentina) Maximiliano Grabiel (Argentina) Miguel Lamperti	(Sweden) Carolina Navarro (Argentina) Cecilia Reiter	6–0 / 6–2	(Argentina) Catalina Tenorio (Spain) Iciar Montes
(Spain) Seville International	7 October 2012	(Spain) Juani Mieres (Brazil) Pablo Lima	6–3 / 6–3	(Spain) Jordi Munoz (Argentina) Maxi Sánchez	Not contested		
(Spain) Valencia International	11 November 2012	(Argentina) Maximiliano Grabiel (Argentina) Miguel Lamperti	6–2 / 6–0	(Argentina) Adrian Allemandi (Spain) Paquito Navarro	(Sweden) Carolina Navarro (Argentina) Cecilia Reiter	6–4 / 6–3	(Argentina) Catalina Tenorio (Spain) Iciar Montes
(Spain) Euskadi International	18 November 2012	(Argentina) Sanyo Gutiérrez (Argentina) Sebastian Nerone	6–3 / 6–3	(Argentina) Hernan Auguste (Brazil) Pablo Lima	(Sweden) Carolina Navarro (Argentina) Cecilia Reiter	6–2 / 6–2	(Spain) Elisabet Amatriain (Spain) Patricia Llaguno
(Spain) Logroño International	2 December 2012	(Argentina) Sanyo Gutiérrez (Argentina) Sebastian Nerone	6–3 / 6–4	(Argentina) Hernan Auguste (Brazil) Pablo Lima	Not contested		
(Spain) Master Final	16 December 2012	(Spain) Juani Mieres (Brazil) Pablo Lima	6–4 / 6–4	(Argentina) Sanyo Gutiérrez (Argentina) Sebastian Nerone	(Sweden) Carolina Navarro (Argentina) Cecilia Reiter	6–2 / 6–2	(Spain) Elisabet Amatriain (Spain) Patricia Llaguno
