= 2008 Padel Pro Tour =

Padel Pro Tour 2008
Details
- Duration: 7 April – 23 November
- Edition: 3rd
- Tournaments: 23
- Categories: International (22); Masters (1)

Achievements (singles)
- Most titles: Male (Argentina) Fernando Belasteguín (Spain) Juan Martín Díaz (16); Female (Sweden) Carolina Navarro (Argentina) Catalina Tenorio (5)
- Most finals: Male (Argentina) Fernando Belasteguín (Spain) Juan Martín Díaz (18); Female (Sweden) Carolina Navarro (Argentina) Catalina Tenorio (9)

The 2008 Padel Pro Tour was the third edition of the Padel Pro Tour, the most prestigious professional padel circuit in the world. In the third edition of the circuit, the Argentinians Fernando Belasteguín and Juan Martín Díaz were crowned number 1 for the a third time, topping the international ranking for the seventh consecutive year. In the female division Catalina Tenorio and Carolina Navarro were crowned number one in PPT for the first time.

== Tournaments and results ==
International Master Final

Tournaments

Tournament	Date	Men's			Women's		
Tournament	Date	Winners	Score	Runners-up	Winners	Score	Runners-up
(Spain) Ciudad Real International	13 April 2008	(Argentina) Fernando Belasteguín (Spain) Juan Martín Díaz	6–4 / 6–4	(Argentina) Cristian Gutiérrez (Argentina) Sebastian Nerone	Not contested		
(Spain) Granada International	27 April 2008	(Argentina) Fernando Belasteguín (Spain) Juan Martín Díaz	5–7 / 6–3 / 6–3	(Spain) Matías Díaz (Argentina) Miguel Lamperti	Not contested		
(Spain) Santander Internacional	12 May 2008	(Argentina) Fernando Belasteguín (Spain) Juan Martín Díaz	6–1 / 3–6 / 7–6	(Argentina) Gabriel Reca (Argentina) Hernan Auguste	Not contested		
(Spain) Catalunya Internacional	19 May 2008	(Argentina) Fernando Belasteguín (Spain) Juan Martín Díaz	6–3 / 6–2	(Spain) Gaston Malacalza (Spain) Willy Lahoz	(Spain) Iciar Montes (Brazil) Neki Berwig	6–3 / 6–6 / WO	(Spain) Alejandra Salazar (Sweden) Carolina Navarro
(Spain) Majadahonda Internacional	31 May 2008	(Argentina) Fernando Belasteguín (Spain) Juan Martín Díaz	6–3 / 6–4	(Argentina) Cristian Gutiérrez (Argentina) Sebastian Nerone	(Spain) Iciar Montes (Brazil) Neki Berwig	6–0 / 6–2	(Argentina) Catalina Tenorio (Argentina) Valeria Pavon
(Spain) Valencia Internacional	15 June 2008	(Argentina) Gabriel Reca (Argentina) Hernan Auguste	7–5 / 1–6 / 7–5	(Argentina) Fernando Belasteguín (Spain) Juan Martín Díaz	(Argentina) Catalina Tenorio (Argentina) Valeria Pavon	6–4 / 4–6 / 6–2	(Spain) Maria Silvela (Argentina) Paula Eyheraguibel
(Spain) Córdoba Internacional	22 June 2008	(Argentina) Cristian Gutiérrez (Argentina) Sebastian Nerone	6–4 / 7–6	(Spain) Matías Díaz (Argentina) Miguel Lamperti	Not contested		
(Spain) La Rioja Internacional	29 June 2008	(Argentina) Fernando Belasteguín (Spain) Juan Martín Díaz	6–2 / 7–5	(Spain) Gaston Malacalza (Spain) Willy Lahoz	Not contested		
(Spain) Valladolid Internacional	6 July 2008	(Argentina) Agustin Gomez Silingo (Argentina) Maxi Grabiel	3–6 / 6–4 / 6–4	(Argentina) Fernando Belasteguín (Spain) Juan Martín Díaz	(Spain) Iciar Montes (Brazil) Neki Berwig	6–4 / 6–4	(Sweden) Carolina Navarro (Argentina) Catalina Tenorio
(Spain) Euskadi International	13 July 2008	(Argentina) Fernando Belasteguín (Spain) Juan Martín Díaz	6–3 / 6–4	(Argentina) Cristian Gutiérrez (Argentina) Sebastian Nerone	Not contested		
(Spain) Madrid International	19 July 2008	(Argentina) Fernando Belasteguín (Spain) Juan Martín Díaz	6–2 / 6–7 / 6–1	(Argentina) Cristian Gutiérrez (Argentina) Sebastian Nerone	(Sweden) Carolina Navarro (Argentina) Catalina Tenorio	6–2 / 2–2 / WO	(Spain) Iciar Montes (Brazil) Neki Berwig
(Spain) Ciudad de El Ejido Internacional	3 August 2008	Not contested			(Sweden) Carolina Navarro (Argentina) Catalina Tenorio	6–3 / 6–3	(Spain) Begona Garralda (Brazil) Michele Treptow
(Spain) Marbella Internacional	10 August 2008	(Argentina) Fernando Belasteguín (Spain) Juan Martín Díaz	6–3 / 6–3	(Argentina) Cristian Gutiérrez (Argentina) Sebastian Nerone	Not contested		
(Spain) Fuengirola International	17 August 2008	(Argentina) Fernando Belasteguín (Spain) Juan Martín Díaz	6–1 / 6–4	(Spain) Matías Díaz (Argentina) Miguel Lamperti	(Sweden) Carolina Navarro (Argentina) Catalina Tenorio	6–1 / 6–3	(Spain) Maria Silvela (Argentina) Paula Eyheraguibel
(Spain) Castellón Internacional	23 August 2008	(Argentina) Fernando Belasteguín (Spain) Juan Martín Díaz	7–5 / 6–3	(Argentina) Cristian Gutiérrez (Argentina) Sebastian Nerone	(Sweden) Carolina Navarro (Argentina) Catalina Tenorio	6–1 / 6–0	(Spain) Maria Silvela (Argentina) Paula Eyheraguibel
(Spain) Las Palmas International	7 September 2008	(Argentina) Fernando Belasteguín (Spain) Juan Martín Díaz	6–1 / 3–6 / 6–3	(Argentina) Cristian Gutiérrez (Argentina) Sebastian Nerone	Not contested		
(Spain) Mérida International	14 September 2008	(Argentina) Fernando Belasteguín (Spain) Juan Martín Díaz	6–3 / 6–3	(Spain) Matías Díaz (Argentina) Miguel Lamperti	Not contested		
(Spain) Euskadi International II	21 September 2008	(Argentina) Fernando Belasteguín (Spain) Juan Martín Díaz	6–4 / 6–3	(Argentina) Cristian Gutiérrez (Argentina) Sebastian Nerone	(Spain) Iciar Montes (Brazil) Neki Berwig	6–4 / 1–6 / 6–3	(Sweden) Carolina Navarro (Argentina) Catalina Tenorio
(Spain) Zaragoza Internacional	28 September 2008	(Argentina) Fernando Belasteguín (Spain) Juan Martín Díaz	6–1 / 6–3	(Argentina) Cristian Gutiérrez (Argentina) Sebastian Nerone	Not contested		
(Spain) Euskadi Internacional III	5 October 2008	(Argentina) Fernando Belasteguín (Spain) Juan Martín Díaz	6–7 / 6–4 / 6–4	(Argentina) Cristian Gutiérrez (Argentina) Sebastian Nerone	(Spain) Iciar Montes (Brazil) Neki Berwig	2–6 / 7–6 / 7–5	(Sweden) Carolina Navarro (Argentina) Catalina Tenorio
(Spain) Alicante Internacional	2 November 2008	(Argentina) Gabriel Reca (Argentina) Hernan Auguste	6–2 / 7–5	(Argentina) Cristian Gutiérrez (Argentina) Sebastian Nerone	Not contested		
(Spain) Salamanca Internacional	9 November 2008	(Spain) Matías Díaz (Argentina) Miguel Lamperti	6–4 / 6–4	(Argentina) Gabriel Reca (Argentina) Hernan Auguste	Not contested		
(Spain) PPT Master Final	23 November 2008	(Argentina) Cristian Gutiérrez (Argentina) Sebastian Nerone	6–3 / 7–6	(Argentina) Gabriel Reca (Argentina) Hernan Auguste	(Sweden) Carolina Navarro (Argentina) Catalina Tenorio	3–6 / 6–1 / 6–1	(Spain) Maria Silvela (Argentina) Paula Eyheraguibel

== End of season ranking ==
Male

2008 Men's Ranking			Tournaments Won		
N.º	Name	Points	International	Master Final	Total
1.	(Argentina) Fernando Belasteguín	3.010	16	0	16
1.	(Spain) Juan Martín Díaz	3.010	16	0	16
3.	(Argentina) Cristian Gutiérrez	2.060	1	1	2
3.	(Argentina) Sebastian Nerone	2.060	1	1	2
5.	(Argentina) Gabriel Reca	1.745	2	0	2
5.	(Argentina) Hernan Auguste	1.745	2	0	2
7.	(Argentina) Miguel Lamperti	1.690	1	0	1
7.	(Spain) Matías Díaz	1.690	1	0	1
9.	(Argentina) Agustin Gomez Silingo	1.125	1	0	1
9.	(Argentina) Maxi Gabriel	1.125	1	0	1
11.	(Brazil) Marcello Jardim	990	0	0	0
11.	(Brazil) Pablo Lima	990	0	0	0
13.	(Spain) Gaston Malacalza	980	0	0	0
14.	(Spain) Guillermo Lahoz	866	0	0	0
15.	(Argentina) Derito Gerardo	718	0	0	0
16.	(Spain) Raul Arias	627	0	0	0

Female

2008 Women's Ranking			Tournaments Won		
N.º	Name	Points	International	Master Final	Total
1.	(Sweden) Carolina Navarro	1.290	4	1	5
1.	(Argentina) Catalina Tenorio	1.290	4	1	5
3.	(Spain) Icair Montes	1.120	6	0	6
3.	(Brazil) Lisandre Berwig	1.120	6	0	6
5.	(Spain) Maria Silvela	840	0	0	0
5.	(Argentina) Paula Eyheraguibel	840	0	0	0
7.	(Argentina) Valeria Pavon	760	1	0	1
8.	(Argentina) Cecilia Reiter	630	0	0	0
9.	(Brazil) Michele Treptow	466	0	0	0
10.	(Spain) Begona Garralda	443	0	0	0
11.	(Argentina) Nelida Brito	404	0	0	0
11.	(Argentina) Silvana Campus	404	0	0	0
13.	(Spain) Ana Fernandez De Osso	359	0	0	0
13.	(Spain) Maria Wakinogg Figueras	359	0	0	0
15.	(Argentina) Alicia Berl	291	0	0	0
15.	(Spain) Vanessa Zamora	291	0	0	0
