= 2021 WPT Málaga Open =

World Padel Tour tournament held in Málaga, Spain

- Date: 2 – 8 August
- Edition: 4th
- Category: Open
- Location: Málaga, Spain
- Venue: Palacio de Deportes José María Martín Carpena

Champions
- Men's doubles: (Argentina) Agustín Tapia (Brazil) Pablo Lima
- Women's doubles: (Spain) Alejandra Salazar (Spain) Gemma Triay

Chronology

The 2021 Málaga Open (officially 2021 World Padel Tour Cervezas Victoria Málaga Open) was the ninth tournament of the ninth season organized by World Padel Tour, the most prestigious padel circuit at the time.

In the women's category, the number one and number seven seeds reached the final, setting up a rematch of the Valencia final. The first finalists were the world number ones, Alejandra Salazar and Gemma Triay, who eliminated the twins Majo and Mapi Sánchez in the semi-finals. Their opponents were Delfina Brea and Tamara Icardo, who reached the final after knocking out the second-ranked pair, Ariana Sánchez and Paula Josemaria. In the decisive match, Gemma and Salazar defeated Delfina and Icardo in straight sets, tying Ariana and Paula with three titles each (two Open's and one Master each) and securing their first title in Málaga.

In the men's category, the third and fifth-seeded pairs reached the final. The first finalists were the number 3 pair, Agustín Tapia and Pablo Lima, who advanced automatically to the final after Arturo Coello and Javi Ruiz were forced to withdraw due to physical issues affecting Ruiz. Their opponents were the fifth ranked pair, Martín Di Nenno and Paquito Navarro, who after eliminating the second-ranked pair, Fernando Belasteguín and Sanyo Gutiérrez, in the quarter-finals went on to defeat the fourth-ranked pair, Federico Chingotto and Juan Tello, in the semi-finals. In the decisive match, Lima and Tapia defeated Di Nenno and Paquito in straight sets, securing their second (consecutive) title of the year. With this victory, Tapia claimed his first title in Málaga, while Lima secured his second (having previously won the 2015).

== Head-to-head record between teams ranked in the top 4 during the season ==
=== Men's ===
| Record | Galán–Lebrón | Belasteguín–Sanyo | Lima–Tapia | Chingotto–Tello | Former Pairs | Di Nenno–Paquito |
| Galán–Lebrón | — | 0–1 | 1–1 | 1–1 | | 3–1 |
| Belasteguín–Sanyo | 1–0 | — | 1–1 | 1–0 | | 1–1 |
| Lima–Tapia | 1–1 | 1–1 | — | 1–0 | | 1–1 |
| Chingotto–Tello | 1–1 | 0–1 | 0–1 | — | | 2–1 |
Former Pairs
| Di Nenno–Paquito | 1–3 | 1–1 | 1–1 | 1–2 | | — |

=== Women's ===
| Record | Gemma–Salazar | Ariana–Josemaria | Bea–Lucia | Marrero–Ortega | Former Pairs | Llaguno–Riera |
| Gemma–Salazar | — | 2–1 | 1–1 | 0–1 | | 2–1 |
| Ariana–Josemaria | 1–2 | — | 3–0 | 2–0 | | 2–1 |
| Bea–Lucia | 1–1 | 0–3 | — | — | | 2–3 |
| Marrero–Ortega | 1–0 | 0–2 | — | — | | — |
Former Pairs
| Llaguno–Riera | 1–2 | 1–2 | 3–2 | — | | — |

== Draws ==
=== Men's Bracket ===
Round of 32
1 | (Spain) Galán / (Spain) Lebrón
Bye
(Spain) Coello / (Spain) J. Ruiz | 6 | 6
(Spain) J. Mieres / (Spain) M. Piñeiro | 1 | 1
(Spain) J. Leal / (Spain) M. Semmler | 3 | 0
(Argentina) A. Silingo / (Spain) J. Sanz | 6 | 3 | *
(Spain) G. Rubio / (Spain) I. Ramírez | 1 | 1
6 | (Spain) A. Ruiz / (Argentina) Stupaczuk | 6 | 6
7 | (Argentina) L. Capra / (Argentina) Maxi | 3 | 4
(Argentina) M. Lamperti / (Spain) M. Yanguas | 6 | 6
(Argentina) R. Moyano / (Spain) U. Botello | 3 | 4
(Argentina) A. Allemandi / (Spain) Coki | 6 | 6
(Argentina) A. Gutiérrez / (Spain) M. Díaz | 4 | 5
(Spain) J. Garrido / (Argentina) J.C. Belluati | 6 | 7
Bye
3 | (Brazil) Lima / (Argentina) Tapia
4 | (Argentina) Chingotto / (Argentina) J. Tello
Bye
(Spain) C. Fuster / (Spain) J. Barahona | 6 | 3 | 2
(Spain) F. Gil Morales / (Spain) S. Alba | 4 | 6 | 6
(Spain) Á. Cepero / (Spain) A. Arroyo | 4 | 5
(Spain) J.M. Díaz / (Spain) P. Lijó | 6 | 7
(Spain) J. Rico / (Spain) V. Ruiz | 6 | 7
8 | (Spain) J. Rico / (Spain) Momo | 4 | 6
5 | (Argentina) Di Nenno / (Spain) Paquito | 7 | 6
(Brazil) L. Bergamini / (Brazil) L. Campagnolo | 5 | 2
(Chile) J. Valdes / (Spain) Rafael Méndez | 6 | 6
(Spain) J.G. Diestro / (Spain) P. Fernández | 2 | 4
(Spain) A. Sans / (Spain) I. Zaratiegui | 7 | 4 | 6
(Spain) E. Alonso / (Spain) J. Moya | 5 | 6 | 4
Bye
2 | (Argentina) Belasteguín / (Argentina) Sanyo

Round of 16
1 | (Spain) Galán / (Spain) Lebrón
(Spain) Coello / (Spain) J. Ruiz | 7 | 2 | 6
(Argentina) A. Silingo / (Spain) J. Sanz | 3 | 6
6 | (Spain) A. Ruiz / (Argentina) Stupaczuk | 6 | 7
(Argentina) M. Lamperti / (Spain) M. Yanguas | 3 | 4
(Argentina) A. Allemandi / (Spain) Coki | 6 | 6
(Spain) J. Garrido / (Argentina) J.C. Belluati | 4 | 2
3 | (Brazil) Lima / (Argentina) Tapia | 6 | 6
4 | (Argentina) Chingotto / (Argentina) J. Tello | 6 | 6
(Spain) F. Gil Morales / (Spain) S. Alba | 2 | 3
(Spain) J.M. Díaz / (Spain) P. Lijó | 6 | 6
(Spain) J. Rico / (Spain) V. Ruiz | 3 | 4
5 | (Argentina) Di Nenno / (Spain) Paquito | 6 | 6
(Chile) J. Valdes / (Spain) Rafael Méndez | 4 | 2
(Spain) A. Sans / (Spain) I. Zaratiegui | 4 | 0
2 | (Argentina) Belasteguín / (Argentina) Sanyo | 6 | 6

Quarter-Final
(Spain) Coello / (Spain) J. Ruiz | 1 | 6 | 6
6 | (Spain) A. Ruiz / (Argentina) Stupaczuk | 6 | 2 | 4
(Argentina) A. Allemandi / (Spain) Coki | 2 | 2
3 | (Brazil) Lima / (Argentina) Tapia | 6 | 6
4 | (Argentina) Chingotto / (Argentina) J. Tello | 6 | 6
(Spain) J.M. Díaz / (Spain) P. Lijó | 2 | 4
5 | (Argentina) Di Nenno / (Spain) Paquito | 6 | 3 | 6
2 | (Argentina) Belasteguín / (Argentina) Sanyo | 3 | 6 | 2

Semi-Finals
(Spain) Coello / (Spain) J. Ruiz
3 | (Brazil) Lima / (Argentina) Tapia | *
4 | (Argentina) Chingotto / (Argentina) J. Tello | 4 | 3
5 | (Argentina) Di Nenno / (Spain) Paquito | 6 | 6

Finals
3 | (Brazil) Lima / (Argentina) Tapia | 6 | 7
5 | (Argentina) Di Nenno / (Spain) Paquito | 2 | 6

=== Women's Bracket ===
Round of 32
1 | (Spain) Gemma / (Spain) Salazar
Bye
(Spain) B. Caldera / (Spain) C. Goenaga | 7 | 3 | 3
(Spain) L. Martínez / (Spain) V. Virseda | 6 | 6 | 6
(Spain) A.F. Ossó / (Argentina) N. Brito | 6 | 6
(Spain) A. Galán / (Spain) M. Villalba | 3 | 1
(Venezuela) A. Seijas Cali / (Spain) E. Frances | 2 | 6 | 2
8 | (Argentina) A. Osoro / (Spain) V. Iglesias | 6 | 2 | 6
6 | (Spain) Mapi / (Spain) Majo | 6 | 6
(Spain) I. Domínguez / (Spain) L. Alonso | 2 | 4
(Argentina) C. Reiter / (Spain) E. Carnicero | 6 | 6
(Spain) A. Cantin / (Spain) A. Soriano | 2 | 4
(France) A. Collombon / (Spain) J. Castelló | 6 | 6
N. Vivancos / (Spain) X. Clasca (Spain) | 2 | 0
Bye
4 | (Spain) M. Marrero / (Spain) M. Ortega
3 | (Spain) Bea González / (Spain) L. Sainz
Bye
(Argentina) C. Tenorio / (Argentina) J. Bidahorria | 6 | 6
(Brazil) M. Schuck / (Spain) M. Caparros | 4 | 3
(Spain) C. Navarro / (Spain) E. Amatriain | 6 | 6
(Spain) A. Cortiles / (Spain) P. Martinez | 3 | 3
(Brazil) R. Piltcher / (Spain) S. Bellver | 2 | 6
7 | (Argentina) D. Brea / (Spain) T. Icardo | 6 | 7
5 | (Spain) P. Llaguno / (Argentina) V. Riera | 4 | 6 | 7
(Spain) L. Rufo / (Spain) M. Talavan | 6 | 3 | 6
(Spain) B. Las Heras / (Spain) C. Mesa | 6 | 4 | 6
(Spain) A. Cañellas / (France) L. Godallier | 3 | 6 | 2
(Spain) M. Guinart / (Spain) N. Rodríguez | 2 | 5
(Portugal) A.C. Nogueira / (Portugal) S. Araújo | 6 | 7
Bye
2 | (Spain) Ariana / (Spain) P. Josemaria

Round of 16
1 | (Spain) Gemma / (Spain) Salazar | 6 | 6
(Spain) L. Martínez / (Spain) V. Virseda | 0 | 1
(Spain) A.F. Ossó / (Argentina) N. Brito | 1 | 4
8 | (Argentina) A. Osoro / (Spain) V. Iglesias | 6 | 6
6 | (Spain) Mapi / (Spain) Majo | 6 | 6
(Argentina) C. Reiter / (Spain) E. Carnicero | 1 | 0
(France) A. Collombon / (Spain) J. Castelló | 6 | 1 | 3
4 | (Spain) M. Marrero / (Spain) M. Ortega | 3 | 6 | 6
3 | (Spain) Bea González / (Spain) L. Sainz | 6 | 6
(Argentina) C. Tenorio / (Argentina) J. Bidahorria | 1 | 2
(Spain) C. Navarro / (Spain) E. Amatriain | 1 | 3
7 | (Argentina) D. Brea / (Spain) T. Icardo | 6 | 6
5 | (Spain) P. Llaguno / (Argentina) V. Riera | 6 | 6 | 6
(Spain) B. Las Heras / (Spain) C. Mesa | 7 | 1 | 0
(Portugal) A.C. Nogueira / (Portugal) S. Araújo | 1 | 3
2 | (Spain) Ariana / (Spain) P. Josemaria | 6 | 6

Quarter-Final
1 | (Spain) Gemma / (Spain) Salazar | 6 | 4 | 6
8 | (Argentina) A. Osoro / (Spain) V. Iglesias | 1 | 6 | 0
6 | (Spain) Mapi / (Spain) Majo | 6 | 7
4 | (Spain) M. Marrero / (Spain) M. Ortega | 1 | 5
3 | (Spain) Bea González / (Spain) L. Sainz | 3 | 6 | 4
7 | (Argentina) D. Brea / (Spain) T. Icardo | 6 | 3 | 6
5 | (Spain) P. Llaguno / (Argentina) V. Riera | 6 | 3 | 4
2 | (Spain) Ariana / (Spain) P. Josemaria | 4 | 6 | 6

Semi-Finals
1 | (Spain) Gemma / (Spain) Salazar | 4 | 6 | 6
6 | (Spain) Mapi / (Spain) Majo | 6 | 3 | 4
7 | (Argentina) D. Brea / (Spain) T. Icardo | 6 | 6
2 | (Spain) Ariana / (Spain) P. Josemaria | 3 | 4

Finals
1 | (Spain) Gemma / (Spain) Salazar | 7 | 6
7 | (Argentina) D. Brea / (Spain) T. Icardo | 5 | 2

== Results ==
=== Round of 32 ===
Men's
| Date | Winners | Score | Opponent | Ref. |
|---|---|---|---|---|
| 4/8/2021 | (Spain) Arturo Coello (Spain) Javier Ruiz | 6–1 / 6–1 | (Spain) Juani Mieres (Spain) Martin Sánchez Piñeiro | |
| 4/8/2021 | (Argentina) Agustin Gómez Silingo (Spain) Jon Sanz | 6–3 / 3–0 / W.O. | (Spain) Javi Leal (Spain) Miguel Semmler | |
| 4/8/2021 | (Spain) Alejandro Ruiz (Argentina) Franco Stupaczuk | 6–1 / 6–1 | (Spain) Gonzalo Rubio (Spain) Iván Ramírez | |
| 4/8/2021 | (Argentina) Miguel Lamperti (Spain) Miguel Yanguas | 6–3 / 6–4 | (Argentina) Lucho Capra (Argentina) Maxi Sánchez | |
| 4/8/2021 | (Argentina) Adrián Allemandi (Spain) Coki Nieto | 6–3 / 6–4 | (Argentina) Ramiro Moyano (Spain) Uri Botello | |
| 4/8/2021 | (Spain) Javi Garrido (Argentina) Juan Cruz Belluati | 6–4 / 7–5 | (Argentina) Agustin Gutiérrez (Spain) Matías Díaz | |
| 4/8/2021 | (Spain) Francisco Gil Morales (Spain) Sergio Alba | 4–6 / 6–3 / 6–2 | (Spain) Christian Fuster (Spain) Javier Barahona | |
| 4/8/2021 | (Spain) Juan Martín Díaz (Spain) Pablo Lijó | 6–4 / 7–5 | (Spain) Alejandro Arroyo (Spain) Álvaro Cepero | |
| 4/8/2021 | (Spain) José Rico (Spain) Victor Ruiz | 6–4 / 7–6 | (Spain) Javier Rico (Spain) Momo González | |
| 4/8/2021 | (Argentina) Martin Di Nenno (Spain) Paquito Navarro | 7–5 / 6–2 | (Brazil) Lucas Bergamini (Brazil) Lucas Campagnolo | |
| 4/8/2021 | (Chile) Javier Valdes (Spain) Rafael Méndez | 6–2 / 6–4 | (Spain) José García Diestro (Spain) Pincho Fernández | |
| 4/8/2021 | (Spain) Anton Sans (Spain) Iñigo Zaratiegui | 7–5 / 4–6 / 6–4 | (Spain) Eduardo Alonso (Spain) Jesús Moya | |

Women's
| Date | Winners | Score | Opponent | Ref. |
|---|---|---|---|---|
| 4/8/2021 | (Spain) Lucía Martínez (Spain) Verónica Virseda | 6–7 / 6–3 / 6–3 | (Spain) Beatriz Caldera (Spain) Carmen Goenaga | |
| 4/8/2021 | (Spain) Ana Fernández de Ossó (Argentina) Nela Brito | 6–3 / 6–1 | (Spain) Alba Galán (Spain) Maria Villalba | |
| 4/8/2021 | (Argentina) Aranzazu Osoro (Spain) Victoria Iglesias | 6–2 / 2–6 / 6–2 | (Venezuela) Ana Seijas Cali (Spain) Estela Frances | |
| 4/8/2021 | (Spain) Mapi Sánchez (Spain) Majo Sánchez | 6–2 / 6–4 | (Spain) Isabel Domínguez (Spain) Lorena Alonso | |
| 4/8/2021 | (Argentina) Cecilia Reiter (Spain) Esther Carnicero | 6–2 / 6–4 | (Spain) Angela Caro Cantin (Spain) Arantxa Soriano | |
| 4/8/2021 | (France) Alix Collombon (Spain) Jessica Castelló | 6–2 / 6–0 | (Spain) Nuria Vivancos (Spain) Xenia Clasca | |
| 4/8/2021 | (Argentina) Catalina Tenorio (Argentina) Julieta Bidahorria | 6–4 / 6–3 | (Brazil) Manuela Schuck (Spain) Marta Caparros | |
| 4/8/2021 | (Spain) Carolina Navarro (Argentina) Cecilia Reiter | 6–3 / 6–3 | (Spain) Anna Cortiles (Spain) Patricia Martinez | |
| 4/8/2021 | (Argentina) Delfina Brea (Spain) Tamara Icardo | 6–2 / 7–6 | (Brazil) Raquel Piltcher (Spain) Sandra Bellver | |
| 4/8/2021 | (Spain) Patricia Llaguno (Argentina) Virginia Riera | 4–6 / 6–3 / 7–6 | (Spain) Lorena Rufo (Spain) Marta Talavan | |
| 4/8/2021 | (Spain) Barbara Las Heras (Spain) Carla Mesa | 6–3 / 4–6 / 6–2 | (Spain) Ariadna Cañellas (France) Lea Godallier | |
| 4/8/2021 | (Portugal) Ana Catarina Nogueira (Portugal) Sofia Araújo | 6–2 / 7–5 | (Spain) Marina Guinart (Spain) Nuria Rodríguez | |

=== Round of 16 ===
Men's
| Date | Winners | Score | Opponent | Ref. |
|---|---|---|---|---|
| 5/8/2021 | (Spain) Arturo Coello (Spain) Javier Ruiz | 7–5 / 2–6 / 6–2 | (Spain) Alejandro Galán (Spain) Juan Lebrón | |
| 5/8/2021 | (Spain) Alejandro Ruiz (Argentina) Franco Stupaczuk | 6–3 / 7–6 | (Argentina) Agustin Gómez Silingo (Spain) Jon Sanz | |
| 5/8/2021 | (Argentina) Adrián Allemandi (Spain) Coki Nieto | 6–3 / 6–4 | (Argentina) Miguel Lamperti (Spain) Miguel Yanguas | |
| 5/8/2021 | (Argentina) Agustín Tapia (Brazil) Pablo Lima | 6–4 / 6–2 | (Spain) Javi Garrido (Argentina) Juan Cruz Belluati | |
| 5/8/2021 | (Argentina) Federico Chingotto (Argentina) Juan Tello | 6–2 / 6–3 | (Spain) Francisco Gil Morales (Spain) Sergio Alba | |
| 5/8/2021 | (Spain) Juan Martín Díaz (Spain) Pablo Lijó | 6–3 / 6–4 | (Spain) José Rico (Spain) Victor Ruiz | |
| 5/8/2021 | (Argentina) Martin Di Nenno (Spain) Paquito Navarro | 6–4 / 6–2 | (Chile) Javier Valdes (Spain) Rafael Méndez | |
| 5/8/2021 | (Argentina) Fernando Belasteguín (Argentina) Sanyo Gutiérrez | 6–4 / 6–0 | (Spain) Anton Sans (Spain) Iñigo Zaratiegui | |

Women's
| Date | Winners | Score | Opponent | Ref. |
|---|---|---|---|---|
| 5/8/2021 | (Spain) Alejandra Salazar (Spain) Gemma Triay | 6–0 / 6–1 | (Spain) Lucía Martínez (Spain) Verónica Virseda | |
| 5/8/2021 | (Argentina) Aranzazu Osoro (Spain) Victoria Iglesias | 6–1 / 6–4 | (Spain) Ana Fernández de Ossó (Argentina) Nela Brito | |
| 5/8/2021 | (Spain) Mapi Sánchez (Spain) Majo Sánchez | 6–1 / 6–0 | (Argentina) Cecilia Reiter (Spain) Esther Carnicero | |
| 5/8/2021 | (Spain) Marta Marrero (Spain) Marta Ortega | 3–6 / 6–1 / 6–3 | (France) Alix Collombon (Spain) Jessica Castelló | |
| 5/8/2021 | (Spain) Bea González (Spain) Lucía Sainz | 6–1 / 6–2 | (Argentina) Catalina Tenorio (Argentina) Julieta Bidahorria | |
| 5/8/2021 | (Argentina) Delfina Brea (Spain) Tamara Icardo | 6–1 / 6–3 | (Spain) Carolina Navarro (Argentina) Cecilia Reiter | |
| 5/8/2021 | (Spain) Patricia Llaguno (Argentina) Virginia Riera | 6–7 / 6–1 / 6–0 | (Spain) Barbara Las Heras (Spain) Carla Mesa | |
| 5/8/2021 | (Spain) Ariana Sánchez (Spain) Paula Josemaria | 6–1 / 6–3 | (Portugal) Ana Catarina Nogueira (Portugal) Sofia Araújo | |

=== Quarter-Finals ===
Men's
| Date | Winners | Score | Opponent | Ref. |
|---|---|---|---|---|
| 6/8/2021 | (Spain) Arturo Coello (Spain) Javier Ruiz | 1–6 / 6–2 / 6–4 | (Spain) Alejandro Ruiz (Argentina) Franco Stupaczuk | |
| 6/8/2021 | (Argentina) Agustín Tapia (Brazil) Pablo Lima | 6–2 / 6–2 | (Argentina) Adrián Allemandi (Spain) Coki Nieto | |
| 6/8/2021 | (Argentina) Federico Chingotto (Argentina) Juan Tello | 6–2 / 6–4 | (Spain) Juan Martín Díaz (Spain) Pablo Lijó | |
| 6/8/2021 | (Argentina) Martin Di Nenno (Spain) Paquito Navarro | 6–3 / 3–6 / 6–2 | (Argentina) Fernando Belasteguín (Argentina) Sanyo Gutiérrez | |

Women's
| Date | Winners | Score | Opponent | Ref. |
|---|---|---|---|---|
| 6/8/2021 | (Spain) Alejandra Salazar (Spain) Gemma Triay | 6–1 / 4–6 / 6–0 | (Argentina) Aranzazu Osoro (Spain) Victoria Iglesias | |
| 6/8/2021 | (Spain) Mapi Sánchez (Spain) Majo Sánchez | 6–1 / 7–5 | (Spain) Marta Marrero (Spain) Marta Ortega | |
| 6/8/2021 | (Argentina) Delfina Brea (Spain) Tamara Icardo | 6–3 / 3–6 / 6–4 | (Spain) Bea González (Spain) Lucía Sainz | |
| 6/8/2021 | (Spain) Ariana Sánchez (Spain) Paula Josemaria | 4–6 / 6–3 / 6–4 | (Spain) Patricia Llaguno (Argentina) Virginia Riera | |

=== Semi-Finals ===
Men's
| Date | Winners | Score | Opponent | Ref. |
|---|---|---|---|---|
| 7/8/2021 | (Argentina) Agustín Tapia (Brazil) Pablo Lima | W.O. | (Spain) Arturo Coello (Spain) Javier Ruiz | |
| 7/8/2021 | (Argentina) Martin Di Nenno (Spain) Paquito Navarro | 6–4 / 6–3 | (Argentina) Federico Chingotto (Argentina) Juan Tello | |

Women's
| Date | Winners | Score | Opponent | Ref. |
|---|---|---|---|---|
| 7/8/2021 | (Spain) Alejandra Salazar (Spain) Gemma Triay | 4–6 / 6–3 / 6–4 | (Spain) Mapi Sánchez (Spain) Majo Sánchez | |
| 7/8/2021 | (Argentina) Delfina Brea (Spain) Tamara Icardo | 6–3 / 6–4 | (Spain) Ariana Sánchez (Spain) Paula Josemaria | |

=== Finals ===
Men's
| Date | Winners | Score | Opponent | Ref. |
|---|---|---|---|---|
| 8/8/2021 | (Argentina) Agustín Tapia (Brazil) Pablo Lima | 6–2 / 7–6 | (Argentina) Martín Di Nenno (Spain) Paquito Navarro | |

Women's
| Date | Winners | Score | Opponent | Ref. |
|---|---|---|---|---|
| 8/8/2021 | (Spain) Alejandra Salazar (Spain) Gemma Triay | 7–5 / 6–2 | (Argentina) Delfina Brea (Spain) Tamara Icardo | |
