= 2021 WPT Valencia Open =

World Padel Tour tournament held in Valencia, Spain

- Date: 6 – 11 July
- Edition: 14th (Note: The first sixth editions were held under the organization of the Padel Pro Tour, while the 10th and 11th we're Master's.)
- Category: Open
- Location: Valencia, Spain
- Venue: Pavelló Municipal Font de Sant Lluís

Champions
- Men's doubles: (Argentina) Fernando Belasteguín (Argentina) Sanyo Gutiérrez
- Women's doubles: (Argentina) Delfina Brea (Spain) Tamara Icardo

Chronology

The 2021 Valencia Open (officially 2021 World Padel Tour Estrella Damm Valencia Open) was the seventh tournament of the ninth season organized by World Padel Tour, the most prestigious padel circuit at the time.

In the women's category, the first finalists were the world number one pair, Alejandra Salazar and Gemma Triay, who eliminated the third seeded pair, Patricia Llaguno and Virginia Riera, in the semi-final. Their opponents were Delfina Brea and Tamara Icardo, who eliminated Aranzazu Osoro and Victoria Iglesias to reach the final. In the decisive match, Delfina and Icardo defeated Gemma and Salazar in three sets, winning their second title of the season and their first in Valencia.

In the men's category, for the first time this season, both of the world's top-ranked pairs reached the final. The first finalists were the world number ones, Alejandro Galán and Juan Lebrón, who eliminated Martín Di Nenno and Paquito Navarro to reach the final. Their opponents were the number two ranked pair, Fernando Belasteguín and Sanyo Gutiérrez, who eliminated the fourth-ranked pair, Federico Chingotto and Juan Tello, in the semi-final. In the championship match, Belasteguín and Sanyo defeated Galán and Lebrón in three sets, preventing them from successfully defending the title won in the previous season and winning their third title of the season, equaling their rivals in titles. With this victory, Sanyo won his third title in Valencia (having already won in 2013 and 2016) while Belasteguín won his sixth (having already won in 2006, 2007, 2009, 2015 and 2018).

== Head-to-head record between teams ranked in the top 4 during the season ==
=== Men's ===
Record	Galán–Lebrón	Belasteguín–Sanyo	Lima–Tapia	Chingotto–Tello	Former Pairs	Di Nenno–Paquito
Galán–Lebrón	—	0–1	1–0	1–1		3–1
Belasteguín–Sanyo	1–0	—	1–0	1–0		1–0
Lima–Tapia	0–1	0–1	—	1–0		0–1
Chingotto–Tello	1–1	0–1	0–1	—		2–0
Former Pairs
Di Nenno–Paquito	1–3	0–1	1–0	0–2		—

=== Women's ===
Record	Gemma–Salazar	Ariana–Josemaria	Bea–Lucia	Llaguno–Riera	Former Pairs	Marrero–Ortega
Gemma–Salazar	—	2–1	1–1	2–1		—
Ariana–Josemaria	1–2	—	2–0	1–1		1–0
Bea–Lucia	1–1	0–2	—	2–3		—
Llaguno–Riera	1–2	1–1	3–2	—		—
Former Pairs
Marrero–Ortega	—	0–1	—	—		—

== Draws ==
=== Men's Bracket ===
Round of 32
1	(Spain) Galán / (Spain) Lebrón
Bye
(Spain) J.G. Diestro / (Spain) P. Fernández	2	6	7
(Spain) F. Gil Morales / (Spain) S. Alba	6	4	6
(Spain) J. Mieres / (Spain) M. Piñeiro	6	3	4
(Spain) Á. Cepero / (Spain) A. Arroyo	4	6	6
(Spain) I. Ramírez / (Spain) M. Yanguas	2	1
7	(Argentina) L. Capra / (Argentina) Maxi	6	6
5	(Argentina) Di Nenno / (Spain) Paquito	6	6
(Spain) Coello / (Argentina) M. Lamperti	3	4
(Argentina) A. Gutiérrez / (Spain) J. Martinez	4	1
(Spain) J. Rico / (Argentina) R. Moyano	6	6
(Spain) G. Rubio / (Spain) R. Méndez	6	6	1
Q	(Chile) J. Valdés / (Spain) J. Serrano	7	2	6
Bye
3	(Brazil) Lima / (Argentina) Tapia
4	(Argentina) Chingotto / (Argentina) J. Tello
Bye
(Spain) J.M. Díaz / (Spain) P. Lijó	7	6
Q	(Spain) C. Fuster / (Spain) J. Sanz	6	2
(Spain) J. Garrido / (Argentina) J.C. Belluati	4	4
Q	(Spain) J. Leal / (Spain) M. Semmler	6	6
Q	(Spain) E. Alonso / (Spain) J. Moya	7	6
8	(Spain) J. Ruiz / (Spain) U. Botello	5	3
6	(Spain) A. Ruiz / (Argentina) Stupaczuk	6	6
(Spain) A. Sans / (Spain) I. Zaratiegui	1	4
(Argentina) A. Silingo / (Spain) M. Díaz	3	1
(Spain) J. Rico / (Spain) Momo	6	6
(Brazil) L. Bergamini / (Brazil) L. Campagnolo	6	6
(Argentina) A. Allemandi / (Spain) Coki	4	1
Bye
2	(Argentina) Belasteguín / (Argentina) Sanyo

Round of 16
1	(Spain) Galán / (Spain) Lebrón	6	6
(Spain) J.G. Diestro / (Spain) P. Fernández	4	0
(Spain) Á. Cepero / (Spain) A. Arroyo	3	5
7	(Argentina) L. Capra / (Argentina) Maxi	6	7
5	(Argentina) Di Nenno / (Spain) Paquito	7	6
(Spain) J. Rico / (Argentina) R. Moyano	5	1
Q	(Chile) J. Valdés / (Spain) J. Serrano	5	3
3	(Brazil) Lima / (Argentina) Tapia	7	6
4	(Argentina) Chingotto / (Argentina) J. Tello	7	4	7
(Spain) J.M. Díaz / (Spain) P. Lijó	6	6	6
Q	(Spain) J. Leal / (Spain) M. Semmler	6	5
Q	(Spain) E. Alonso / (Spain) J. Moya	7	7
6	(Spain) A. Ruiz / (Argentina) Stupaczuk	6	7	7
(Spain) J. Rico / (Spain) Momo	7	5	5
(Brazil) L. Bergamini / (Brazil) L. Campagnolo	3	4
2	(Argentina) Belasteguín / (Argentina) Sanyo	6	6

Quarter-Final
1	(Spain) Galán / (Spain) Lebrón	6	7
7	(Argentina) L. Capra / (Argentina) Maxi	2	6
5	(Argentina) Di Nenno / (Spain) Paquito	6	6
3	(Brazil) Lima / (Argentina) Tapia	1	3
4	(Argentina) Chingotto / (Argentina) J. Tello	7	6
Q	(Spain) E. Alonso / (Spain) J. Moya	6	2
6	(Spain) A. Ruiz / (Argentina) Stupaczuk	2	0
2	(Argentina) Belasteguín / (Argentina) Sanyo	6	1	*

Semi-Finals
1	(Spain) Galán / (Spain) Lebrón	6	1	6
5	(Argentina) Di Nenno / (Spain) Paquito	3	6	4
4	(Argentina) Chingotto / (Argentina) J. Tello	4	4
2	(Argentina) Belasteguín / (Argentina) Sanyo	6	6

Finals
1	(Spain) Galán / (Spain) Lebrón	5	6	4
2	(Argentina) Belasteguín / (Argentina) Sanyo	7	3	6

=== Women's Bracket ===
Round of 32
1	(Spain) Gemma / (Spain) Salazar
Bye
(Argentina) C. Tenorio / (Argentina) J. Bidahorria	6	3	3
(Spain) C. Navarro / (Argentina) C. Reiter	2	6	6
(Spain) L. Rufo / (Spain) M. Talavan	6	6
(Spain) A. Cortiles / (Spain) P. Martinez	3	1
(Spain) A. Galán / (Spain) M. Villalba	*
5	(Spain) Majo / (Spain) Mapi
8	(Spain) E. Amatriain / (Portugal) S. Araújo	6	6
(Spain) I. Domínguez / (Spain) L. Alonso	4	1
LL	(Spain) A. Blanco / (Spain) S. Hernández	6	1
(Spain) E. Carnicero / (Brazil) R. Piltcher	7	6
(Spain) B. Las Heras / (Spain) C. Mesa	2	6	6
(Spain) L. Martínez / (Spain) V. Virseda	6	4	4
Bye
3	(Spain) P. Llaguno / (Argentina) V. Riera
4	(Spain) M. Marrero / (Spain) M. Ortega
Bye
Q	(Spain) J. Velasco / (Spain) N. Canovas	6	5	2
(Portugal) A.C. Nogueira / (Spain) T. Navarro	0	7	6
Q	(Spain) A.F. Ossó / (Argentina) N. Brito	5	0
(France) A. Collombon / (Spain) J. Castelló	7	6
Q	(Spain) N. Vivancos / (Spain) X. Clasca	3	4
7	(Argentina) D. Brea / (Spain) T. Icardo	6	6
6	(Argentina) A. Osoro / (Spain) V. Iglesias	6	3	6
(Spain) A. Cantin / (Spain) A. Soriano	2	6	4
(Argentina) C. Paz / (Spain) M. Merino	6	7
(Argentina) C. Jensen / (Spain) S. Bellver	2	6
(Spain) B. Caldera / (Spain) C. Goenaga	6	4	6
(Italy) C. Orsi / (Italy) G. Sussarello	1	6	3
Bye
2	(Spain) Bea González / (Spain) L. Sainz

Round of 16
1	(Spain) Gemma / (Spain) Salazar	6	6
(Spain) C. Navarro / (Argentina) C. Reiter	2	1
(Spain) L. Rufo / (Spain) M. Talavan	6	6
(Spain) A. Galán / (Spain) M. Villalba	3	3
8	(Spain) E. Amatriain / (Portugal) S. Araújo	6	6
(Spain) E. Carnicero / (Brazil) R. Piltcher	3	0
(Spain) B. Las Heras / (Spain) C. Mesa	5	1
3	(Spain) P. Llaguno / (Argentina) V. Riera	7	6
4	(Spain) M. Marrero / (Spain) M. Ortega	6	6
(Portugal) A.C. Nogueira / (Spain) T. Navarro	1	1
(France) A. Collombon / (Spain) J. Castelló	3	0
7	(Argentina) D. Brea / (Spain) T. Icardo	6	6
6	(Argentina) A. Osoro / (Spain) V. Iglesias	6	6
(Argentina) C. Paz / (Spain) M. Merino	2	4
(Spain) B. Caldera / (Spain) C. Goenaga	6	4	6
2	(Spain) Bea González / (Spain) L. Sainz	4	6	4

Quarter-Final
1	(Spain) Gemma / (Spain) Salazar	6	6
(Spain) L. Rufo / (Spain) M. Talavan	1	3
8	(Spain) E. Amatriain / (Portugal) S. Araújo	2	3
3	(Spain) P. Llaguno / (Argentina) V. Riera	6	6
4	(Spain) M. Marrero / (Spain) M. Ortega	6	4	6
7	(Argentina) D. Brea / (Spain) T. Icardo	3	6	7
6	(Argentina) A. Osoro / (Spain) V. Iglesias	6	6
(Spain) B. Caldera / (Spain) C. Goenaga	0	0

Semi-Finals
1	(Spain) Gemma / (Spain) Salazar	6	4	6
3	(Spain) P. Llaguno / (Argentina) V. Riera	0	6	1
7	(Argentina) D. Brea / (Spain) T. Icardo	6	6
6	(Argentina) A. Osoro / (Spain) V. Iglesias	3	1

Finals
1	(Spain) Gemma / (Spain) Salazar	7	1	4
7	(Argentina) D. Brea / (Spain) T. Icardo	6	6	6

== Results ==
=== Round of 32 ===
Men's
Date	Winners	Score	Opponent	Ref.
7/7/2021	(Spain) José García Diestro (Spain) Pincho Fernández	2–6 / 6–4 / 7–6	(Spain) Francisco Gil Morales (Spain) Sergio Alba	
7/7/2021	(Spain) Alejandro Arroyo (Spain) Salvador Oria	4–6 / 6–3 / 6–4	(Spain) Juani Mieres (Spain) Martín Sánchez Piñeiro	
7/7/2021	(Argentina) Lucho Capra (Argentina) Maxi Sánchez	6–2 / 6–1	(Spain) Iván Ramírez (Spain) Mike Yanguas	
7/7/2021	(Argentina) Martin Di Nenno (Spain) Paquito Navarro	6–3 / 6–4	(Spain) Arturo Coello (Argentina) Miguel Lamperti	
7/7/2021	(Spain) José Rico (Argentina) Ramiro Moyano	6–4 / 6–1	(Argentina) Agustín Gutiérrez (Spain) Javier Martinez Vázquez	
7/7/2021	(Chile) Javier Valdés (Spain) Jose Sánchez Serrano	7–6 / 2–6 / 6–1	(Spain) Gonzalo Rubio (Spain) Rafael Méndez	
7/7/2021	(Spain) Juan Martín Díaz (Spain) Pablo Lijó	7–6 / 6–2	(Spain) Christian Fuster (Spain) Jon Sanz	
7/7/2021	(Spain) Javi Leal (Spain) Miguel Semmler	6–4 / 6–4	(Spain) Javi Garrido (Argentina) Juan Cruz Belluati	
7/7/2021	(Spain) Eduardo Alonso (Spain) Jesús Moya	7–5 / 6–3	(Spain) Javier Ruiz (Spain) Uri Botello	
7/7/2021	(Spain) Alejandro Ruiz (Argentina) Franco Stupaczuk	6–1 / 6–4	(Spain) Anton Sans (Spain) Iñigo Zaratiegui	
7/7/2021	(Spain) Javier Rico (Spain) Momo González	6–3 / 6–1	(Argentina) Agustin Gomez Silingo (Spain) Matías Díaz	
7/7/2021	(Brazil) Lucas Bergamini (Brazil) Lucas Campagnolo	6–4 / 6–1	(Argentina) Adrián Allemandi (Spain) Coki Nieto	

Women's
Date	Winners	Score	Opponent	Ref.
7/7/2021	(Spain) Carolina Navarro (Argentina) Cecilia Reiter	2–6 / 6–3 / 6–3	(Argentina) Catalina Tenorio (Argentina) Julieta Bidahorria	
7/7/2021	(Spain) Lorena Rufo (Spain) Marta Talavan	6–3 / 6–1	(Spain) Anna Cortiles (Spain) Patricia Martinez	
7/7/2021	(Spain) Alba Galán (Spain) Maria Villalba	W.O.	(Spain) Majo Sánchez (Spain) Mapi Sánchez	
7/7/2021	(Spain) Elisabeth Amatriain (Portugal) Sofia Araújo	6–4 / 6–1	(Spain) Isabel Domínguez (Spain) Lorena Alonso	
7/7/2021	(Spain) Esther Carnicero (Brazil) Raquel Piltcher	7–6 / 6–1	(Spain) Alicia Blanco Rojo (Spain) Sandra Hernández	
7/7/2021	(Spain) Barbara Las Heras (Spain) Carla Mesa	2–6 / 6–4 / 6–4	(Spain) Lucía Martínez (Spain) Verónica Virseda	
7/7/2021	(Portugal) Ana Catarina Nogueira (Spain) Teresa Navarro	0–6 / 7–5 / 6–2	(Spain) Jimena Velasco (Spain) Noa Canovas	
7/7/2021	(France) Alix Collombon (Spain) Jessica Castelló	7–5 / 6–0	(Spain) Ana Fernández de Ossó (Argentina) Nela Brito	
7/7/2021	(Argentina) Delfina Brea (Spain) Tamara Icardo	6–3 / 6–4	(Spain) Nuria Vivancos (Spain) Xenia Clasca	
7/7/2021	(Argentina) Aranzazu Osoro (Spain) Victoria Iglesias	6–2 / 3–6 / 6–4	(Spain) Angela Caro Cantin (Spain) Arantxa Soriano	
7/7/2021	(Argentina) Celeste Paz (Spain) Melania Merino	6–2 / 7–6	(Argentina) Claudia Jensen (Spain) Sandra Bellver	
7/7/2021	(Spain) Beatriz Caldera (Spain) Carmen Goenaga	6–1 / 4–6 / 6–3	(Italy) Carolina Orsi (Italy) Giulia Sussarello	

=== Round of 16 ===
Men's
Date	Winners	Score	Opponent	Ref.
8/7/2021	(Spain) Alejandro Galán (Spain) Juan Lebrón	6–4 / 6–0	(Spain) José García Diestro (Spain) Pincho Fernández	
8/7/2021	(Argentina) Lucho Capra (Argentina) Maxi Sánchez	6–3 / 7–5	(Spain) Alejandro Arroyo (Spain) Salvador Oria	
8/7/2021	(Argentina) Martin Di Nenno (Spain) Paquito Navarro	7–5 / 6–1	(Spain) José Rico (Argentina) Ramiro Moyano	
8/7/2021	(Argentina) Agustín Tapia (Brazil) Pablo Lima	7–5 / 6–3	(Chile) Javier Valdés (Spain) Jose Sánchez Serrano	
8/7/2021	(Argentina) Federico Chingotto (Argentina) Juan Tello	7–6 / 4–6 / 7–6	(Spain) Juan Martín Díaz (Spain) Pablo Lijó	
8/7/2021	(Spain) Eduardo Alonso (Spain) Jesús Moya	7–6 / 7–5	(Spain) Javi Leal (Spain) Miguel Semmler	
8/7/2021	(Spain) Alejandro Ruiz (Argentina) Franco Stupaczuk	6–7 / 7–5 / 7–5	(Spain) Javier Rico (Spain) Momo González	
8/7/2021	(Argentina) Fernando Belasteguín (Argentina) Sanyo Gutiérrez	6–3 / 6–4	(Brazil) Lucas Bergamini (Brazil) Lucas Campagnolo	

Women's
Date	Winners	Score	Opponent	Ref.
8/7/2021	(Spain) Alejandra Salazar (Spain) Gemma Triay	6–2 / 6–1	(Spain) Carolina Navarro (Argentina) Cecilia Reiter	
8/7/2021	(Spain) Lorena Rufo (Spain) Marta Talavan	6–3 / 6–3	(Spain) Alba Galán (Spain) Maria Villalba	
8/7/2021	(Spain) Elisabeth Amatriain (Portugal) Sofia Araújo	6–3 / 6–0	(Spain) Esther Carnicero (Brazil) Raquel Piltcher	
8/7/2021	(Spain) Patricia Llaguno (Argentina) Virginia Riera	7–5 / 6–1	(Spain) Barbara Las Heras (Spain) Carla Mesa	
8/7/2021	(Spain) Marta Marrero (Spain) Marta Ortega	6–1 / 6–1	(Portugal) Ana Catarina Nogueira (Spain) Teresa Navarro	
8/7/2021	(Argentina) Delfina Brea (Spain) Tamara Icardo	6–3 / 6–0	(France) Alix Collombon (Spain) Jessica Castelló	
8/7/2021	(Argentina) Aranzazu Osoro (Spain) Victoria Iglesias	6–2 / 6–4	(Argentina) Celeste Paz (Spain) Melania Merino	
8/7/2021	(Spain) Beatriz Caldera (Spain) Carmen Goenaga	6–4 / 4–6 / 6–4	(Spain) Bea González (Spain) Lucía Sainz	

=== Quarter-Finals ===
Men's
Date	Winners	Score	Opponent	Ref.
9/7/2021	(Spain) Alejandro Galán (Spain) Juan Lebrón	6–2 / 7–6	(Argentina) Lucho Capra (Argentina) Maxi Sánchez	
9/7/2021	(Argentina) Martin Di Nenno (Spain) Paquito Navarro	6–1 / 6–3	(Argentina) Agustín Tapia (Brazil) Pablo Lima	
9/7/2021	(Argentina) Federico Chingotto (Argentina) Juan Tello	7–6 / 6–2	(Spain) Eduardo Alonso (Spain) Jesús Moya	
9/7/2021	(Argentina) Fernando Belasteguín (Argentina) Sanyo Gutiérrez	6–2 / 1–0 / W.O.	(Spain) Alejandro Ruiz (Argentina) Franco Stupaczuk	

Women's
Date	Winners	Score	Opponent	Ref.
9/7/2021	(Spain) Alejandra Salazar (Spain) Gemma Triay	6–1 / 6–3	(Spain) Lorena Rufo (Spain) Marta Talavan	
9/7/2021	(Spain) Patricia Llaguno (Argentina) Virginia Riera	6–2 / 6–3	(Spain) Elisabeth Amatriain (Portugal) Sofia Araújo	
9/7/2021	(Argentina) Delfina Brea (Spain) Tamara Icardo	3–6 / 6–4 / 7–6	(Spain) Marta Marrero (Spain) Marta Ortega	
9/7/2021	(Argentina) Aranzazu Osoro (Spain) Victoria Iglesias	6–0 / 6–0	(Spain) Beatriz Caldera (Spain) Carmen Goenaga	

=== Semi-Finals ===
Men's
Date	Winners	Score	Opponent	Ref.
10/7/2021	(Spain) Alejandro Galán (Spain) Juan Lebrón	6–3 / 1–6 / 6–4	(Argentina) Martin Di Nenno (Spain) Paquito Navarro	
10/7/2021	(Argentina) Fernando Belasteguín (Argentina) Sanyo Gutiérrez	6–4 / 6–4	(Argentina) Federico Chingotto (Argentina) Juan Tello	

Women's
Date	Winners	Score	Opponent	Ref.
10/7/2021	(Spain) Alejandra Salazar (Spain) Gemma Triay	6–0 / 4–6 / 6–1	(Spain) Patricia Llaguno (Argentina) Virginia Riera	
10/7/2021	(Argentina) Delfina Brea (Spain) Tamara Icardo	6–3 / 6–1	(Argentina) Aranzazu Osoro (Spain) Victoria Iglesias	

=== Finals ===
Men's
Date	Winners	Score	Opponent	Ref.
11/7/2021	(Argentina) Fernando Belasteguín (Argentina) Sanyo Gutiérrez	7–5 / 3–6 / 6–4	(Spain) Alejandro Galán (Spain) Juan Lebrón	

Women's
Date	Winners	Score	Opponent	Ref.
11/7/2021	(Argentina) Delfina Brea (Spain) Tamara Icardo	6–7 / 6–1 / 6–4	(Spain) Alejandra Salazar (Spain) Gemma Triay	
