= 2018 WPT Valencia Master =

World Padel Tour tournament held in Valencia, Spain

- Date: 2 – 8 July
- Edition: 11th (Note: The first sixth editions were held under the organization of the Padel Pro Tour, while the first two edition under World Padel Tour we're Open's.)
- Category: Master
- Location: Valencia, Spain
- Venue: Pavelló Municipal Font de Sant Lluís

Champions
- Men's doubles: (Argentina) Fernando Belasteguín (Brazil) Pablo Lima
- Women's doubles: (Spain) Mapi Sánchez (Spain) Majo Sánchez

Chronology

The 2018 Valencia Master (officially 2018 World Padel Tour Valencia Master) was the sixth tournament of the sixth season organized by World Padel Tour, the most prestigious padel circuit at the time.

In the women's category, a pair ranked outside the top 3 reached the final for the first time this season, after Ariana Sánchez and Marta Ortega eliminated Gemma Triay and Lucia Sainz in the semifinals. In the title match, the twins Mapi and Majo Sánchez, the world number 1s who where playing in their fifth final of the year, defeated Ariana and Gemma, securing their second title of the season and the twins first in Valencia.

In the men's category, the top two ranked pairs met in the final for the first time this season. With the number one ranking on the line, Fernando Belasteguín and Pablo Lima easily defeated Maxi Sánchez and Sanyo Gutiérrez, retaining the top spot, thereby preventing Sanyo from rising to number one, and claiming their second title of the season. With this victory, they secured their second title as a pair in Valencia (Belasteguín's fourth and Lima's second individually).

== Relevant Data ==
=== Sanyo and Maxi Sánchez put pressure on the top spot ===
Heading into the tournament, Maxi Sánchez and Sanyo Gutiérrez had the chance to overtake Fernando Belasteguín and Pablo Lima in the race for the number one ranking. A victory would see Sanyo claim the top spot outright, dethroning the current number ones and becoming the first player in 16 years to knock Belasteguín out of the top spot.

== Head-to-head record between teams ranked in the top 4 during the season ==
=== Men's ===
Record	Belasteguín–Lima	Maxi–Sanyo	J.M. Díaz–Paquito	Gutiérrez–Stupaczuk
Belasteguín–Lima	—	1–0	1–0	1–0
Maxi–Sanyo	0–1	—	3–0	1–0
J.M. Díaz–Paquito	0–1	0–3	—	—
Gutiérrez–Stupaczuk	0–1	0–1	—	—

=== Women's ===
Record	Majo–Mapi	Marrero–Salazar	Triay–Sainz	Amatriain–Llaguno	Former Pairs	Ariana–Ortega
Majo–Mapi	—	1–1	2–3	3–0		1–0
Marrero–Salazar	1–1	—	1–3	1–0		2–0
Triay–Sainz	3–2	3–1	—	—		1–0
Amatriain–Llaguno	0–3	0–1		—		1–2
Former Pairs						
Ariana–Ortega	0–1	0–2	—	2–1		—

== Draws ==
=== Men's Bracket ===
Round of 32
1	(Argentina) Belasteguín / (Brazil) Lima	6	6
(Spain) J.G. Diestro / (Argentina) S. Nerone	3	2
(Argentina) C.G. Gutiérrez / (Argentina) J. Vázquez	3	7	3
(Spain) B. Yribarren / (Argentina) J. Escalante	6	6	6
(Argentina) F. Chingotto / (Argentina) G. Tamame	6	3	2
Q	(Spain) C. Nieto / (Spain) J. Rico	4	6	6
(Argentina) M. Grabiel / (Spain) P. Lijó	4	4
(Spain) J. Mieres / (Argentina) M. Lamperti	6	6
(Spain) Galán / (Spain) M. Díaz	6	7
(Argentina) F. Quiles / (Brazil) F. Gomes	4	6
(Argentina) J. Restivo / (Spain) T. Bueno	4	3
(Spain) M. Piñeiro / (Spain) W. Lahoz	6	6
(Spain) G. Company / (Spain) R. Rivera	7	1	1
(Argentina) A. Patiniotis / (Spain) J. Muñoz	6	6	6
(Brazil) M. Jardim / (Argentina) Tapia	7	2	6
4	(Argentina) C. Gutiérrez / (Argentina) Stupaczuk	6	6	7
3	(Spain) J.M. Díaz / (Spain) Paquito	6	6
(Spain) J. Ruiz / (Spain) U. Botello	2	4
(Argentina) A. Allemandi / (Spain) J. Garrido	6	3	6
(Spain) A. Cepero / (Argentina) G. Díaz	4	6	3
Q	(Uruguay) D. Ramos / (Spain) R. Méndez	3	6
(Argentina) L. Capra / (Argentina) R. Moyano	6	7
Q	(Spain) C. Fuster / (Spain) M. Solbes	6	2
(Brazil) L. Bergamini / (Brazil) L. Campagnolo	7	6
(Argentina) J.C. Belluati / (Spain) Lebrón	3	7	3
(Spain) A. Santana / (Spain) I. Gadea	6	6	6
(Argentina) M. Nicoletti / (Spain) P.A. Martínez	6	0
(Argentina) A. Silingo / (Spain) A. Ruiz	7	6
Q	(Spain) J. Barahona / (Spain) Momo	3	6	6
(Spain) G. Rubio / (Spain) E. Moreno	6	3	4
(Spain) J. Rico / (Spain) V. Ruiz	1	3
2	(Argentina) Maxi / (Argentina) Sanyo	6	6

Round of 16
1	(Argentina) Belasteguín / (Brazil) Lima	6	6
(Spain) B. Yribarren / (Argentina) J. Escalante	0	1
Q	(Spain) C. Nieto / (Spain) J. Rico	4	6
(Spain) J. Mieres / (Argentina) M. Lamperti	6	7
(Spain) Galán / (Spain) M. Díaz	6	6
(Spain) M. Piñeiro / (Spain) W. Lahoz	1	3
(Argentina) A. Patiniotis / (Spain) J. Muñoz	3	2
4	(Argentina) C. Gutiérrez / (Argentina) Stupaczuk	6	6
3	(Spain) J.M. Díaz / (Spain) Paquito	7	6
(Argentina) A. Allemandi / (Spain) J. Garrido	5	2
(Argentina) L. Capra / (Argentina) R. Moyano	6	6
(Brazil) L. Bergamini / (Brazil) L. Campagnolo	2	4
(Spain) A. Santana / (Spain) I. Gadea	7	2	4
(Argentina) A. Silingo / (Spain) A. Ruiz	5	6	6
Q	(Spain) J. Barahona / (Spain) Momo	1	3
2	(Argentina) Maxi / (Argentina) Sanyo	6	6

Quarter-Final
1	(Argentina) Belasteguín / (Brazil) Lima	7	7
(Spain) J. Mieres / (Argentina) M. Lamperti	6	6
(Spain) Galán / (Spain) M. Díaz	7	6
4	(Argentina) C. Gutiérrez / (Argentina) Stupaczuk	6	1
3	(Spain) J.M. Díaz / (Spain) Paquito	6	6
(Argentina) L. Capra / (Argentina) R. Moyano	2	0
(Argentina) A. Silingo / (Spain) A. Ruiz	5	5
2	(Argentina) Maxi / (Argentina) Sanyo	7	7

Semi-Finals
1	(Argentina) Belasteguín / (Brazil) Lima	6	6
(Spain) Galán / (Spain) M. Díaz	1	2
3	(Spain) J.M. Díaz / (Spain) Paquito	6	5	3
2	(Argentina) Maxi / (Argentina) Sanyo	1	7	6

Finals
1	(Argentina) Belasteguín / (Brazil) Lima	6	6
2	(Argentina) Maxi / Sanyo	0	2

=== Women's Bracket ===
Round of 32
1	(Spain) Majo / (Spain) Mapi
Bye
(Argentina) A. Berl / (Spain) N. Márquez	6	6
Q	(Spain) A. Martín / (Spain) I. Arzamendi	2	2
(Spain) A. Blanco / (Spain) B. Caldera	1	1
(Spain) C. Mesa / (Spain) L. Martínez	6	6
Q	(Spain) N. Traviesa / (Spain) R. Aguilar	2	1
(Spain) T. Navarro / (Spain) V. Iglesias	6	6
(Spain) C. Navarro / (Argentina) C. Reiter	6	6
(Spain) A. Medina / (France) L. Clergue	0	2
(Spain) A. Martinez / (Portugal) F. Mendonça	2	4
(Portugal) A.C. Nogueira / (Argentina) Delfina	6	6
(Spain) P. Josemaria / (Argentina) V. Pavón	6	6
(Spain) I. Domínguez / (Spain) V. Alonso	1	2
Bye
3	(Spain) A. Salazar / (Spain) M. Marrero
4	(Spain) E. Amatriain / (Spain) P. Llaguno
Bye
(Spain) E. Ramírez / (Spain) S. Vidal	6	2	2
(Spain) M. Talaván / (Spain) T. Icardo	3	6	6
Q	(Spain) M. Gonzalez / (Brazil) R. Piltcher	2	1
(Spain) A. Galán / (Spain) M. Villalba	6	6
(Spain) A. Cantin / (Spain) N. Rodriguez	2	2
(Spain) A. Sánchez / (Spain) M. Ortega	6	6
(Spain) B. González / (Argentina) C. Tenorio	6	7
(Spain) L. Alonso / (Argentina) V. Riera	3	6
LL	(Spain) A. Soriano / (Spain) C. García	2	2
(Spain) S. Hernández / (Spain) V. Virseda	6	6
(Argentina) A. Osoro / (Argentina) N. Brito	6	6
(Spain) A.F. de Ossó / (Spain) M. Gabarrus	1	2
Bye
2	(Spain) Gemma / (Spain) L. Sainz

Round of 16
1	(Spain) Majo / (Spain) Mapi	6	6
(Argentina) A. Berl / (Spain) N. Márquez	2	0
(Spain) C. Mesa / (Spain) L. Martínez	6	1	2
(Spain) T. Navarro / (Spain) V. Iglesias	3	6	6
(Spain) C. Navarro / (Argentina) C. Reiter	3	6	6
(Portugal) A.C. Nogueira / (Argentina) Delfina	6	0	1
(Spain) P. Josemaria / (Argentina) V. Pavón	3	1
3	(Spain) A. Salazar / (Spain) M. Marrero	6	6
4	(Spain) E. Amatriain / (Spain) P. Llaguno	6	6
(Spain) M. Talaván / (Spain) T. Icardo	2	0
(Spain) A. Galán / (Spain) M. Villalba	4	1
(Spain) A. Sánchez / (Spain) M. Ortega	6	6
(Spain) B. González / (Argentina) C. Tenorio	6	6
(Spain) S. Hernández / (Spain) V. Virseda	4	1
(Argentina) A. Osoro / (Argentina) N. Brito	5	5
2	(Spain) Gemma / (Spain) L. Sainz	7	7

Quarter-Final
1	(Spain) Majo / (Spain) Mapi	6	6
(Spain) T. Navarro / (Spain) V. Iglesias	0	0
(Spain) C. Navarro / (Argentina) C. Reiter	2	2
3	(Spain) A. Salazar / (Spain) M. Marrero	6	6
4	(Spain) E. Amatriain / (Spain) P. Llaguno	2	1
(Spain) A. Sánchez / (Spain) M. Ortega	6	6
(Spain) B. González / (Argentina) C. Tenorio	3	4
2	(Spain) Gemma / (Spain) L. Sainz	6	6

Semi-Finals
1	(Spain) Majo / (Spain) Mapi	6	6
3	(Spain) A. Salazar / (Spain) M. Marrero	4	4
(Spain) A. Sánchez / (Spain) M. Ortega	6	4	6
2	(Spain) Gemma / (Spain) L. Sainz	3	6	7

Finals
1	(Spain) Majo / (Spain) Mapi	6	6
2	(Spain) Gemma / (Spain) L. Sainz	3	4

== Results ==
=== Round of 32 ===
Men's

Date	Winners	Score	Opponent	Refs.
4/7/2018	(Argentina) Fernando Belasteguín (Brazil) Pablo Lima	6–3 / 6–2	(Spain) José García Diestro (Argentina) Sebastián Nerone	
4/7/2018	(Spain) Borja Yribarren (Argentina) Javier Escalante	6–3 / 6–7 / 6–3	(Argentina) Cristian German Gutiérrez (Argentina) Juan Manuel Vázquez	
4/7/2018	(Spain) Coki Nieto (Spain) Javi Rico	4–6 / 6–3 / 6–2	(Argentina) Federico Chingotto (Argentina) Germán Tamame	
4/7/2018	(Spain) Juani Mieres (Argentina) Miguel Lamperti	6–4 / 6–4	(Argentina) Maxi Grabiel (Spain) Pablo Lijó	
4/7/2018	(Spain) Alejandro Galán (Spain) Matías Díaz	6–4 / 7–6	(Argentina) Federico Quiles (Brazil) Francisco Gomes	
4/7/2018	(Spain) Martin Sanchez Piñeiro (Spain) Willy Lahoz	6–4 / 6–3	(Argentina) Juan Manuel Restivo (Spain) Toni Bueno	
4/7/2018	(Argentina) Aris Patiniotis (Spain) Jordi Muñoz	6–7 / 6–1 / 6–1	(Spain) Gerard Company (Spain) Rubén Rivera	
4/7/2018	(Argentina) Cristian Gutiérrez (Argentina) Franco Stupaczuk	6–7 / 6–2 / 7–6	(Argentina) Agustín Tapia (Brazil) Marcello Jardim	
4/7/2018	(Spain) Juan Martin Díaz (Spain) Paquito Navarro	6–2 / 6–4	(Spain) Javi Ruiz (Spain) Uri Botello	
4/7/2018	(Argentina) Adrián Allemandi (Spain) Javi Garrido	6–4 / 3–6 / 6–3	(Spain) Álvaro Cepero (Argentina) Godo Díaz	
4/7/2018	(Argentina) Lucho Capra (Argentina) Ramiro Moyano	6–3 / 7–6	(Uruguay) Diego Ramos (Spain) Rafael Méndez	
4/7/2018	(Brazil) Lucas Bergamini (Brazil) Lucas Campagnolo	7–6 / 6–2	(Spain) Christian Fuster (Spain) Miguel Solbes	
4/7/2018	(Spain) Aday Santana (Spain) Nacho Gadea	6–3 / 6–7 / 6–3	(Argentina) Juan Cruz Belluati (Spain) Juan Lebrón	
4/7/2018	(Argentina) Agustin Gomez Silingo (Spain) Alejandro Ruiz	7–6 / 6–0	(Argentina) Matías Nicoletti (Spain) Pedro Alonso Martínez	
4/7/2018	(Spain) Javier Barahona (Spain) Momo González	3–6 / 6–3 / 6–4	(Spain) Gonzalo Rubio (Spain) Ernesto Moreno	
4/7/2018	(Argentina) Maxi Sánchez (Argentina) Sanyo Gutiérrez	6–1 / 6–3	(Spain) José Rico (Spain) Víctor Ruiz	

Women's

Date	Winners	Score	Opponent	Refs.
4/7/2018	(Spain) Alicia Lilian Berl (Spain) Noelia Márquez	6–2 / 6–2	(Spain) Ainhoa Rico Martín (Spain) Irene Arzamendi García	
4/7/2018	(Spain) Carla Mesa (Spain) Lucía Martínez	6–1 / 6–1	(Spain) Alicia Blanco Rojo (Spain) Beatriz Caldera	
4/7/2018	(Spain) Teresa Navarro (Spain) Victoria Iglesias	6–2 / 6–1	(Spain) Nicole Traviesa Mola (Spain) Raquel Segura Aguilar	
4/7/2018	(Spain) Carolina Navarro (Argentina) Cecilia Reiter	6–0 / 6–2	(Spain) Andrea Medina (France) Laura Clergue	
4/7/2018	(Portugal) Ana Catarina Nogueira (Argentina) Delfina Brea	6–2 / 6–4	(Spain) Araceli Martinez (Portugal) Filipa Mendonça	
4/7/2018	(Spain) Paula Josemaria (Argentina) Valeria Pavón	6–1 / 6–2	(Spain) Isabel Domínguez (Spain) Vanesa Alonso	
4/7/2018	(Spain) Marta Talaván (Spain) Tamara Icardo	3–6 / 6–2 / 6–2	(Spain) Elena Ramírez (Spain) Silvia López Vidal	
4/7/2018	(Spain) Alba Galán (Spain) Maria Villalba	6–2 / 6–1	(Spain) Marta Gonzalez (Brazil) Raquel Piltcher	
4/7/2018	(Spain) Ariana Sánchez (Spain) Marta Ortega	6–2 / 6–2	(Spain) Angela Caro Cantin (Spain) Nuria Rodriguez	
4/7/2018	(Spain) Beatriz González (Argentina) Catalina Tenorio	6–3 / 7–6	(Spain) Lorena Alonso (Argentina) Virginia Riera	
4/7/2018	(Spain) Sandra Hernández (Spain) Verónica Virseda	6–2 / 6–2	(Spain) Arantxa Soriano (Spain) Carmen García Pardo	
4/7/2018	(Argentina) Aranzazu Osoro (Argentina) Nela Brito	6–1 / 6–2	(Spain) Ana Fernandez de Ossó (Spain) Maite Gabarrus Alonso	

=== Round of 16 ===
Men's

Date	Winners	Score	Opponent	Refs.
5/7/2018	(Argentina) Fernando Belasteguín (Brazil) Pablo Lima	6–0 / 6–1	(Spain) Borja Yribarren (Argentina) Javier Escalante	
5/7/2018	(Spain) Juani Mieres (Argentina) Miguel Lamperti	6–4 / 7–6	(Spain) Coki Nieto (Spain) Javi Rico	
5/7/2018	(Spain) Alejandro Galán (Spain) Matías Díaz	6–1 / 6–3	(Spain) Martin Sanchez Piñeiro (Spain) Willy Lahoz	
5/7/2018	(Argentina) Cristian Gutiérrez (Argentina) Franco Stupaczuk	6–3 / 6–2	(Argentina) Aris Patiniotis (Spain) Jordi Muñoz	
5/7/2018	(Spain) Juan Martin Díaz (Spain) Paquito Navarro	7–5 / 6–2	(Argentina) Adrián Allemandi (Spain) Javi Garrido	
5/7/2018	(Argentina) Lucho Capra (Argentina) Ramiro Moyano	6–2 / 6–4	(Brazil) Lucas Bergamini (Brazil) Lucas Campagnolo	
5/7/2018	(Argentina) Agustin Gomez Silingo (Spain) Alejandro Ruiz	5–7 / 6–2 / 6–4	(Spain) Aday Santana (Spain) Nacho Gadea	
5/7/2018	(Argentina) Maxi Sánchez (Argentina) Sanyo Gutiérrez	6–1 / 6–3	(Spain) Javier Barahona (Spain) Momo González	

Women's

Date	Winners	Score	Opponent	Refs.
5/7/2018	(Spain) Majo Sanchez (Spain) Mapi Sanchez	6–2 / 6–0	(Spain) Alicia Lilian Berl (Spain) Noelia Márquez	
5/7/2018	(Spain) Teresa Navarro (Spain) Victoria Iglesias	3–6 / 6–1 / 6–2	(Spain) Carla Mesa (Spain) Lucía Martínez	
5/7/2018	(Spain) Carolina Navarro (Argentina) Cecilia Reiter	3–6 / 6–0 / 6–1	(Portugal) Ana Catarina Nogueira (Argentina) Delfina Brea	
5/7/2018	(Spain) Alejandra Salazar (Spain) Marta Marrero	6–3 / 6–1	(Spain) Paula Josemaria (Argentina) Valeria Pavón	
5/7/2018	(Spain) Elisabeth Amatriain (Spain) Patricia Llaguno	6–2 / 6–0	(Spain) Marta Talaván (Spain) Tamara Icardo	
5/7/2018	(Spain) Ariana Sánchez (Spain) Marta Ortega	6–4 / 6–1	(Spain) Alba Galán (Spain) Maria Villalba	
5/7/2018	(Spain) Beatriz González (Argentina) Catalina Tenorio	6–4 / 6–1	(Spain) Sandra Hernández (Spain) Verónica Virseda	
5/7/2018	(Spain) Gemma Triay (Spain) Lucía Sainz	7–5 / 7–5	(Argentina) Aranzazu Osoro (Argentina) Nela Brito	

=== Quarter-Finals ===
Men's

Date	Winners	Score	Opponent	Refs.
6/7/2018	(Argentina) Fernando Belasteguín (Brazil) Pablo Lima	7–6 / 7–6	(Spain) Juani Mieres (Argentina) Miguel Lamperti	
6/7/2018	(Spain) Alejandro Galán (Spain) Matías Díaz	7–5 / 6–1	(Argentina) Cristian Gutiérrez (Argentina) Franco Stupaczuk	
6/7/2018	(Spain) Juan Martin Díaz (Spain) Paquito Navarro	6–2 / 6–0	(Argentina) Lucho Capra (Argentina) Ramiro Moyano	
6/7/2018	(Argentina) Maxi Sánchez (Argentina) Sanyo Gutiérrez	7–5 / 7–5	(Argentina) Agustin Gomez Silingo (Spain) Alejandro Ruiz	

Women's

Date	Winners	Score	Opponent	Refs.
6/7/2018	(Spain) Majo Sanchez (Spain) Mapi Sanchez	6–0 / 6–0	(Spain) Teresa Navarro (Spain) Victoria Iglesias	
6/7/2018	(Spain) Alejandra Salazar (Spain) Marta Marrero	6–2 / 6–2	(Spain) Carolina Navarro (Argentina) Cecilia Reiter	
6/7/2018	(Spain) Ariana Sánchez (Spain) Marta Ortega	6–2 / 6–1	(Spain) Elisabeth Amatriain (Spain) Patricia Llaguno	
6/7/2018	(Spain) Gemma Triay (Spain) Lucía Sainz	6–3 / 6–4	(Spain) Beatriz González (Argentina) Catalina Tenorio	

=== Semi-Finals ===
Men's

Date	Winners	Score	Opponent	Refs.
7/7/2018	(Argentina) Fernando Belasteguín (Brazil) Pablo Lima	6–1 / 6–2	(Spain) Alejandro Galán (Spain) Matías Díaz	
7/7/2018	(Argentina) Maxi Sánchez (Argentina) Sanyo Gutiérrez	1–6 / 7–5 / 6–3	(Spain) Juan Martin Díaz (Spain) Paquito Navarro	

Women's

Date	Winners	Score	Opponent	Refs.
7/7/2018	(Spain) Majo Sanchez (Spain) Mapi Sanchez	6–4 / 6–4	(Spain) Alejandra Salazar (Spain) Marta Marrero	
7/7/2018	(Spain) Ariana Sánchez (Spain) Marta Ortega	3–6 / 6–4 / 7–6	(Spain) Gemma Triay (Spain) Lucía Sainz	

=== Finals ===
Men's

Date	Winners	Score	Opponent	Refs.
8/7/2018	(Argentina) Fernando Belasteguín (Brazil) Pablo Lima	6–0 / 6–2	(Argentina) Maxi Sánchez (Argentina) Sanyo Gutiérrez	

Women's

Date	Winners	Score	Opponent	Refs.
8/7/2018	(Spain) Majo Sanchez (Spain) Mapi Sanchez	6–3 / 6–4	(Spain) Ariana Sánchez (Spain) Marta Ortega	
