= 2025 Valladolid P2 =

Padel championships

- Date: 21 – 29 June
- Edition: 2nd
- Category: P2
- Prize money: €262.250
- Location: Valladolid, Spain
- Venue: Plaza Mayor

Champions
- Men's doubles: (Argentina) Agustín Tapia (Spain) Arturo Coello
- Women's doubles: (Spain) Ariana Sánchez (Spain) Paula Josemaría

Chronology

The 2025 Valladolid P2 (officially 2025 Oysho Valladolid Premier Padel P2) was the eleventh tournament of the fourth season organized by Premier Padel, the premier padel circuit, promoted by the International Padel Federation, and with the financial backing of Nasser Al-Khelaïfi's Qatar Sports Investments.

In the women's category, Ariana Sánchez and Paula Josemaría reached their third consecutive final, where they faced Bea González and Claudia Fernández. In the title match, the FIP number 1 ranked pair defeated Bea and Claudia in straight sets, securing their fourth title of 2025.

In the men's category, Franco Stupaczuk and Juan Lebrón reached their fifth final of 2025, where they faced the world number 1 pair in a rematch of the Riyadh final. In the title match, Agustín Tapia and Arturo Coello defeated the number three seeds in straight sets, claiming their fifth title of the season.

== Relevant Data ==
=== Return to Plaza Mayor ===
Having established itself as an iconic venue for the sport over the last decade under the World Padel Tour banner, Valladolid’s Plaza Mayor was set to host a professional padel tournament once again, for the first time as part of the Premier Padel circuit. The previous season, the Valladolid P1 had been held at the Polideportivo Pisuerga, an indoor arena.

=== Ortega debuts with new partner ===
After playing just three tournaments with Alejandra Alonso, Marta Ortega parted ways with her to team up with Tamara Icardo, while Claudia Jensen, Icardo's former partner, joined forces with Alonso, starting at the Valladolid P2.

=== Lebrón secures his first victory over Galán ===
With the victory of Franco Stupaczuk and Juan Lebrón, Lebrón defeated his former partner for the first time since their split, and after seven consecutive losses in head-to-head matches.

=== The women's number 1 spot changes hands again ===
With the victory of Ariana Sánchez and Paula Josemaría over Bea González and Claudia Fernández, in their eight meeting of the season and which brought the head-to-head record to 7–1 in favor of the world number ones, Ariana and Paula have reclaimed the top spot in the rankings.

=== Coello and Tapia set new records ===
With their victory at the Valladolid P2, Agustín Tapia and Arturo Coello secured their 34th title, achieving this feat in less than two and a half seasons, and surpassing the pairing of Alejandro Galán and Juan Lebrón, who had won 33.

Since teaming up in 2023, they won 15 titles on their debut season (11 on the World Padel Tour and 4 on Premier Padel), becoming the pair with the most titles in a single season. They improved upon that performance last season, reaching 19 finals across 20 tournaments, achieving 45 consecutive victories and 9 consecutive titles.

As of 2025, they have already won 5 titles out of 6 finals and 9 tournaments played (they did not play in 2).

== Seeds ==
Male

Rnk.	Team	FIP Ranking Points
1	(Argentina) Agustín Tapia (Spain) Arturo Coello	36080
2	(Spain) Alejandro Galán (Argentina) Federico Chingotto	26100
3	(Argentina) Franco Stupaczuk (Spain) Juan Lebrón	16435
4	(Spain) Coki Nieto (Spain) Mike Yanguas	13467
5	(Spain) Jon Sanz (Spain) Momo Gonzalez	10312
6	(Brazil) Lucas Bergamini (Spain) Paquito Navarro	9405
7	(Argentina) Leandro Augsburguer (Spain) Pablo Cardona	6589
8	(Spain) Eduardo Alonso (Spain) Jairo Bautista	6335
9	(Spain) Francisco Guerrero (Spain) Javi Leal	4988
10	(Spain) Alejandro Arroyo (United Arab Emirates) Inigo Jofre	4433
11	(Spain) Javier Barahona (Spain) Javier Garcia Mora	4155
12	(Argentina) Alex Chozas (Argentina) Sanyo Gutiérrez	3862
13	(Spain) Diego Gil (Spain) Javier Garrido	3660
14	(Spain) Jose Garcia Diestro (Spain) Juanlu Esbri	3580
15	(Argentina) Gonzalo Alfonso (Argentina) Leonel Aguirre	3312
16	(Argentina) Juan Tello (Argentina) Miguel Lamperti	3194

Female

Rnk.	Team	FIP Ranking Points
1	(Spain) Ariana Sánchez (Spain) Paula Josemaria	31920
2	(Argentina) Delfina Brea (Spain) Gemma Triay	30560
3	(Spain) Bea González (Spain) Claudia Fernandéz	20470
4	(Spain) Andrea Ustero (Portugal) Sofia Araújo	12645
5	(Spain) Marta Ortega (Spain) Tamara Icardo	11005
6	(Spain) Alejandra Salazar (Spain) Veronica Virseda	9775
7	(Spain) Alejandra Alonso (Argentina) Claudia Jensen	8720
8	(Spain) Lucia Sainz (Spain) Patricia Llaguno	7515
9	(Spain) Jessica Castello (Spain) Lorena Rufo	5795
10	(Argentina) Aranzazu Osoro (Spain) Martina Calvo	5702
11	(Spain) Beatriz Caldera (Spain) Carmen Goenaga	5489
12	(Spain) Marina Guinart (Spain) Victoria Iglesias	5326
13	(France) Alix Collombon (Spain) Araceli Martinez	3910
14	(Italy) Carolina Orsi (Spain) Nuria Rodriguez	3631
15	(Argentina) Lucia Martinez Gomez (Spain) Marta Marrero	3598
16	(Spain) Raquel Eugenio Barrera (Argentina) Virginia Riera	3479

== Head-to-head record between teams ranked in the top 4 during the season ==
=== Man's ===
Record	Coello–Tapia	Galán–Chingotto	Lebrón–Stupaczuk	Coki–Yanguas
Coello–Tapia	—	2–1	2–1	2–0
Galán–Chingotto	1–2	—	3–1	2–0
Lebrón–Stupaczuk	1–2	1–3	—	—
Coki–Yanguas	0–2	0–2	—	—

=== Women's ===
Record	Ariana–Paula	D. Brea–Triay	Gonzalez–Fernandez	Araújo–Ustero	Former Pairs	Araújo–Ortega
Ariana–Paula	—	1–4	7–1	1–0		1–1
D. Brea–Triay	4–1	—	1–4	1–0		3–0
Gonzalez–Fernandez	1–7	4–1	—	—		—
Araújo–Ustero	0–1	0–1	—	—		—
Former Pairs						
Araújo–Ortega	1–1	0–3	—	—		—

Because the Santiago final ended in a draw, it is not counted.

== Draws ==
=== Men's Bracket ===
Round of 32
1	(Spain) Coello / (Argentina) Tapia	6	6
Q	(Spain) P.H. Alvarez / (Argentina) R. Valenzuela	4	3
WC	(Spain) A. Arriaga / (Spain) S. Rivas	6	6
WC	(Spain) F. Sotillo / (Spain) R. Coello	3	4
21	(Spain) A. Cepero / (Argentina) A. Torre	4	6	3
13	(Spain) F. Gil / (Spain) V. Ruiz	6	2	6
LL	(Argentina) J. Tello / (Argentina) M. Lamperti	4	3
8	(Spain) E. Alonso / (Spain) J. Bautista	6	6
5	(Spain) J. Sanz / (Spain) Momo	7	6
18	(Spain) D. Sánchez / (Brazil) L. Campagnolo	6	2
24	(Spain) G. Rubio / (Spain) J. Ruiz	6	4
19	(Portugal) M. Deus / (Portugal) N. Deus	7	6
26	(Argentina) F. Mouriño / (Spain) P. Fernandez	3	4
15	(Argentina) G. Alfonso / (Argentina) L. Aguirre	6	6
9	(Spain) F. Guerrero / (Spain) J. Leal	7	7
4	(Spain) Coki / (Spain) Yanguas	5	6
3	(Spain) J. Lebrón / (Argentina) Stupaczuk	6	7
10	(Spain) A. Arroyo / (United Arab Emirates) I. Jofre	1	6
14	(Spain) J.G. Diestro / (Spain) J. Esbri	3	6	3
13	(Spain) D. Bautista / (Spain) J. Garrido	6	3	6
25	(Spain) E. Goenaga / (Spain) L.H. Quesada	3	6
Q	(United Arab Emirates) A. Ayats / (Spain) P.G. Rodrigo	6	7
23	(Argentina) J.C. Belluati / (Spain) P. Lijó	1	7	3
6	(Brazil) L. Bergamini / (Spain) Paquito	6	6	6
7	(Argentina) L. Augsburger / (Spain) P. Cardona	7	6
Q	(Spain) A.R. Martinez / (Argentina) J. Rubini	6	4
11	(Spain) J. Barahona / (Spain) J.G. Mora	7	6	6
22	(Spain) J.J. Casas / (Spain) T. Zapata	6	7	1
20	(Italy) A. Patiniotis / (Spain) I. Sager	1	6	6
Q	(Sweden) A. Axelsson / (Spain) F. Ramirez	6	4	7
12	(Argentina) A. Chozas / (Argentina) Sanyo	1	3
2	(Spain) Galán / (Argentina) Chingotto	6	6

Round of 16
1	(Spain) Coello / (Argentina) Tapia
WC	(Spain) A. Arriaga / (Spain) S. Rivas	2	1
13	(Spain) F. Gil / (Spain) V. Ruiz	6	6
8	(Spain) E. Alonso / (Spain) J. Bautista	7	7
5	(Spain) J. Sanz / (Spain) Momo	6	7	7
19	(Portugal) M. Deus / (Portugal) N. Deus	7	6	6
15	(Argentina) G. Alfonso / (Argentina) L. Aguirre	3	6
9	(Spain) F. Guerrero / (Spain) J. Leal	6	7
3	(Spain) J. Lebrón / (Argentina) Stupaczuk	7	6
13	(Spain) D. Bautista / (Spain) J. Garrido	6	3
Q	(United Arab Emirates) A. Ayats / (Spain) P.G. Rodrigo	7	4	2
6	(Brazil) L. Bergamini / (Spain) Paquito	5	6	6
7	(Argentina) L. Augsburger / (Spain) P. Cardona	3	6	6
11	(Spain) J. Barahona / (Spain) J.G. Mora	6	3	4
Q	(Sweden) A. Axelsson / (Spain) F. Ramirez	5	2
2	(Spain) Galán / (Argentina) Chingotto	7	6

Quarter-Final
1	(Spain) Coello / (Argentina) Tapia	6	6
8	(Spain) E. Alonso / (Spain) J. Bautista	4	3
5	(Spain) J. Sanz / (Spain) Momo	3	7	6
9	(Spain) F. Guerrero / (Spain) J. Leal	6	6	7
3	(Spain) J. Lebrón / (Argentina) Stupaczuk	7	6
6	(Brazil) L. Bergamini / (Spain) Paquito	6	2
7	(Argentina) L. Augsburger / (Spain) P. Cardona	6	6
2	(Spain) Galán / (Argentina) Chingotto	7	7

Semi-Finals
1	(Spain) Coello / (Argentina) Tapia	6	6
9	(Spain) F. Guerrero / (Spain) J. Leal	4	4
3	(Spain) J. Lebrón / (Argentina) Stupaczuk	6	6	7
2	(Spain) Galán / (Argentina) Chingotto	7	4	6

Finals
1	(Spain) Coello / (Argentina) Tapia	7	6
3	(Spain) J. Lebrón / (Argentina) Stupaczuk	5	4

=== Women's Bracket ===
Round of 32
1	(Spain) A. Sánchez / (Spain) P. Josemaria
Bye
Q	(Spain) L. Lopez / (Spain) S. Lapuente	6	1
13	(France) A. Collombon / (Spain) A. Martinez	7	6
11	(Spain) B. Caldera / (Spain) C. Goenaga	6	6
Q	(Spain) J. Cabruja / (Spain) M. Arellano	0	3
Bye
7	(Spain) A. Alonso / (Argentina) C. Jensen
8	(Spain) L. Sainz / (Spain) P. Llaguno
Bye
19	(Spain) C. Mesa / (Spain) S. Ruiz	6	6
14	(Italy) C. Orsi / (Spain) N. Rodriguez	4	1
10	(Argentina) A. Osoro / (Spain) M. Calvo	6	6
16	(Spain) R. Barrera / (Argentina) V. Riera	2	2
Bye
4	(Spain) A. Ustero / (Portugal) S. Araújo
3	(Spain) B. González / (Spain) C. Fernandéz
Bye
17	(Spain) J. Velasco / (Spain) N. Canovas	3	4
9	(Spain) J. Castelló / (Spain) L. Rufo	6	6
15	(Spain) L. Martinez / (Spain) M. Marrero	7	6
Q	(Spain) M. Talavan / (Spain) T. Navarro	5	4
Bye
5	(Spain) M. Ortega / (Spain) T. Icardo
6	(Spain) A. Salazar / (Spain) V. Virseda
Bye
18	(Russia) K. Sharifova / (Spain) M.R. Abajo	6	4	7
WC	(Sweden) C. Navarro / (Spain) M. Merino	2	6	5
12	(Spain) M. Guinart / (Spain) V. Iglesias	3	6	6
Q	(Spain) L. Rodriguez / (France) L. Godallier
Bye
2	(Argentina) D. Brea / (Spain) G. Triay

Round of 16
1	(Spain) A. Sánchez / (Spain) P. Josemaria	6	6
13	(France) A. Collombon / (Spain) A. Martinez	1	4
11	(Spain) B. Caldera / (Spain) C. Goenaga	6	6
7	(Spain) A. Alonso / (Argentina) C. Jensen	3	1
8	(Spain) L. Sainz / (Spain) P. Llaguno	7	6
19	(Spain) C. Mesa / (Spain) S. Ruiz	5	2
10	(Argentina) A. Osoro / (Spain) M. Calvo	7	7
4	(Spain) A. Ustero / (Portugal) S. Araújo	6	6
3	(Spain) B. González / (Spain) C. Fernandéz	6	7
9	(Spain) J. Castelló / (Spain) L. Rufo	1	6
15	(Spain) L. Martinez / (Spain) M. Marrero	0	0
5	(Spain) M. Ortega / (Spain) T. Icardo	6	6
6	(Spain) A. Salazar / (Spain) V. Virseda	7	3	5
18	(Russia) K. Sharifova / (Spain) M.R. Abajo	5	6	7
12	(Spain) M. Guinart / (Spain) V. Iglesias	2	2
2	(Argentina) D. Brea / (Spain) G. Triay	6	6

Quarter-Final
1	(Spain) A. Sánchez / (Spain) P. Josemaria	6	6
11	(Spain) B. Caldera / (Spain) C. Goenaga	2	2
8	(Spain) L. Sainz / (Spain) P. Llaguno	6	4	4
10	(Argentina) A. Osoro / (Spain) M. Calvo	1	6	6
3	(Spain) B. González / (Spain) C. Fernandéz	7	7
5	(Spain) M. Ortega / (Spain) T. Icardo	5	6
18	(Russia) K. Sharifova / (Spain) M.R. Abajo	0	1
2	(Argentina) D. Brea / (Spain) G. Triay	6	6

Semi-Finals
1	(Spain) A. Sánchez / (Spain) P. Josemaria	6	6
10	(Argentina) A. Osoro / (Spain) M. Calvo	2	1
3	(Spain) B. González / (Spain) C. Fernandéz	7	3	*
2	(Argentina) D. Brea / (Spain) G. Triay	6	1

Finals
1	(Spain) A. Sánchez / (Spain) P. Josemaria	6	7
3	(Spain) B. González / (Spain) C. Fernandéz	4	5

== Results ==
=== Round of 32 ===
Men's

Date	Winners	Score	Opponent	Refs.
25/6/2025	(Argentina) Agustín Tapia (Spain) Arturo Coello	6–4 / 6–3	(Spain) Pol Hernandez (Argentina) Ramiro Valenzuela	
25/6/2025	(Spain) Alfonso Sanchez Arriaga (Spain) Samuel Rivas García	6–3 / 6–4	(Spain) Ferran Insa (Spain) Rodrigo Coello	
25/6/2025	(Spain) Francisco Gil Morales (Spain) Victor Ruiz	6–4 / 2–6 / 6–3	(Spain) Alvero Cepero (Argentina) Eduardo Agustin Torre	
25/6/2025	(Spain) Eduardo Alonso (Spain) Jairo Bautista	6–4 / 6–3	(Argentina) Juan Tello (Argentina) Miguel Lamperti	
24/6/2025	(Spain) Jon Sanz (Spain) Momo Gonzalez	7–6 / 6–2	(Spain) David Gala Sanchez (Brazil) Lucas Campagnolo	
24/6/2025	(Portugal) Miguel Deus (Portugal) Nuno Deus	7–6 / 6–4	(Spain) Gonzalo Rubio (Spain) Javi Ruiz	
24/6/2025	(Argentina) Gonzalo Alfonso (Argentina) Leonel Aguirre	6–3 / 6–4	(Argentina) Federico Mouriño (Spain) Pincho Fernandez	
25/6/2025	(Spain) Francisco Guerrero (Spain) Javier Leal	7–5 / 7–6	(Spain) Coki Nieto (Spain) Mike Yanguas	
25/6/2025	(Argentina) Franco Stupaczuk (Spain) Juan Lebrón	6–1 / 7–6	(Spain) Alex Arroyo (United Arab Emirates) Iñigo Jofre	
24/6/2025	(Spain) Diego Gil Batista (Spain) Javier Garrido	6–3 / 3–6 / 6–3	(Spain) Jose García Diestro (Spain) Juanlu Esbri	
24/6/2025	(United Arab Emirates) Arnau Ayats (Spain) Pablo García Rodrigo	6–3 / 7–6	(Spain) Enrique Goenaga (Spain) Luis Hernandez Quesada	
24/6/2025	(Brazil) Lucas Bergamini (Spain) Paquito Navarro	6–1 / 6–7 / 6–3	(Argentina) Juan Cruz Belluati (Spain) Pablo Lijó	
25/6/2025	(Argentina) Leandro Augsburger (Spain) Pablo Cardona	7–6 / 6–4	(Spain) Alonso Rodriguez (Argentina) Juan Ignacio Rubini	
25/6/2025	(Spain) Javier Barahona (Spain) Javier García Mora	7–6 / 6–7 / 6–1	(Spain) Jose Jimenez Casas (Spain) Teodoro Zapata	
24/6/2025	(Sweden) Adam Axelsson (Spain) Fran Ramirez	6–1 / 4–6 / 7–6	(Italy) Aris Patiniotis (Spain) Ignacio Sager	
24/6/2025	(Spain) Alejandro Galán (Argentina) Federico Chingotto	6–1 / 6–3	(Argentina) Alex Chozas (Argentina) Sanyo Gutiérrez	

Women's

Date	Winners	Score	Opponent	Refs.
24/6/2025	(France) Alix Collombon (Spain) Araceli Martinez	7–6 / 6–1	(Spain) Lucía Fernandez Lopez (Spain) Sara Foguer	
24/6/2025	(Spain) Beatriz Caldera (Spain) Carmen Goenaga	6–0 / 6–3	(Spain) Jana Montes (Spain) Marta Arellano	
23/6/2025	(Spain) Carla Mesa (Spain) Sara Ruiz Soto	6–4 / 6–1	(Italy) Carolina Orsi (Spain) Nuria Rodriguez	
23/6/2025	(Argentina) Aranzazu Osoro (Spain) Martina Calvo	6–2 / 6–2	(Spain) Raquel Eugenio Barrera (Argentina) Virginia Riera	
23/6/2025	(Spain) Jessica Castelló (Spain) Lorena Rufo	6–3 / 6–4	(Spain) Jimena Velasco (Spain) Noa Canovas	
24/6/2025	(Spain) Lucia Martinez Gomez (Spain) Marta Marrero	7–5 / 6–4	(Spain) Marta Talavan (Spain) Teresa Navarro	
23/6/2025	(Russia) Ksenia Sharifova (Spain) Laia Rodriguez Abajo	6–2 / 4–6 / 7–5	(Sweden) Carolina Navarro Björk (Spain) Melania Merino	
23/6/2025	(Spain) Marina Guinart (Spain) Victoria Iglesias	3–6 / 6–3 / 6–3	(Spain) Laura Lujan Rodriguez (France) Lea Godallier	

=== Round of 16 ===
Men's

Date	Winners	Score	Opponent	Refs.
26/6/2025	(Argentina) Agustín Tapia (Spain) Arturo Coello	6–2 / 6–1	(Spain) Alfonso Sanchez Arriaga (Spain) Samuel Rivas García	
26/6/2025	(Spain) Eduardo Alonso (Spain) Jairo Bautista	7–6 / 7–6	(Spain) Francisco Gil Morales (Spain) Victor Ruiz	
26/6/2025	(Spain) Jon Sanz (Spain) Momo Gonzalez	6–7 / 7–6 / 7–6	(Portugal) Miguel Deus (Portugal) Nuno Deus	
26/6/2025	(Spain) Francisco Guerrero (Spain) Javier Leal	6–3 / 7–6	(Argentina) Gonzalo Alfonso (Argentina) Leonel Aguirre	
26/6/2025	(Argentina) Franco Stupaczuk (Spain) Juan Lebrón	7–6 / 6–3	(Spain) Diego Gil Batista (Spain) Javier Garrido	
26/6/2025	(Brazil) Lucas Bergamini (Spain) Paquito Navarro	5–7 / 6–4 / 6–2	(United Arab Emirates) Arnau Ayats (Spain) Pablo García Rodrigo	
26/6/2025	(Argentina) Leandro Augsburger (Spain) Pablo Cardona	3–6 / 6–3 / 6–4	(Spain) Javier Barahona (Spain) Javier García Mora	
26/6/2025	(Spain) Alejandro Galán (Argentina) Federico Chingotto	7–5 / 6–2	(Sweden) Adam Axelsson (Spain) Fran Ramirez	

Women's

Date	Winners	Score	Opponent	Refs.
26/6/2025	(Spain) Ariana Sánchez (Spain) Paula Josemaría	6–1 / 6–4	(France) Alix Collombon (Spain) Araceli Martinez	
26/6/2025	(Spain) Beatriz Caldera (Spain) Carmen Goenaga	6–3 / 6–1	(Spain) Alejandra Alonso (Argentina) Claudia Jensen	
25/6/2025	(Spain) Lucia Sainz (Spain) Patricia Llaguno	7–5 / 6–2	(Spain) Carla Mesa (Spain) Sara Ruiz Soto	
25/6/2025	(Argentina) Aranzazu Osoro (Spain) Martina Calvo	7–6 / 7–6	(Spain) Andrea Ustero (Portugal) Sofia Araújo	
25/6/2025	(Spain) Bea González (Spain) Claudia Fernández	6–1 / 7–6	(Spain) Jessica Castelló (Spain) Lorena Rufo	
26/6/2025	(Spain) Marta Ortega (Spain) Tamara Icardo	6–0 / 6–0	(Spain) Lucia Martinez Gomez (Spain) Marta Marrero	
25/6/2025	(Russia) Ksenia Sharifova (Spain) Laia Rodriguez Abajo	5–7 / 6–3 / 7–5	(Spain) Alejandra Salazar (Spain) Verónica Virseda	
26/6/2025	(Argentina) Delfina Brea (Spain) Gemma Triay	6–2 / 6–2	(Spain) Marina Guinart (Spain) Victoria Iglesias	

=== Quarter-Finals ===
Men's

Date	Winners	Score	Opponent	Refs.
27/6/2025	(Argentina) Agustín Tapia (Spain) Arturo Coello	6–4 / 6–3	(Spain) Eduardo Alonso (Spain) Jairo Bautista	
27/6/2025	(Spain) Francisco Guerrero (Spain) Javier Leal	6–3 / 6–7 / 7–6	(Spain) Jon Sanz (Spain) Momo Gonzalez	
27/6/2025	(Argentina) Franco Stupaczuk (Spain) Juan Lebrón	7–6 / 6–2	(Brazil) Lucas Bergamini (Spain) Paquito Navarro	
27/6/2025	(Spain) Alejandro Galán (Argentina) Federico Chingotto	7–6 / 7–6	(Argentina) Leandro Augsburger (Spain) Pablo Cardona	

Women's

Date	Winners	Score	Opponent	Refs.
27/6/2025	(Spain) Ariana Sánchez (Spain) Paula Josemaría	6–2 / 6–2	(Spain) Beatriz Caldera (Spain) Carmen Goenaga	
27/6/2025	(Argentina) Aranzazu Osoro (Spain) Martina Calvo	1–6 / 6–4 / 6–4	(Spain) Lucia Sainz (Spain) Patricia Llaguno	
27/6/2025	(Spain) Bea González (Spain) Claudia Fernández	7–5 / 7–6	(Spain) Marta Ortega (Spain) Tamara Icardo	
27/6/2025	(Argentina) Delfina Brea (Spain) Gemma Triay	6–0 / 6–1	(Russia) Ksenia Sharifova (Spain) Laia Rodriguez Abajo	

=== Semi-Finals ===
Men's

Date	Winners	Score	Opponent	Refs.
28/6/2025	(Argentina) Agustín Tapia (Spain) Arturo Coello	6–4 / 6–4	(Spain) Francisco Guerrero (Spain) Javier Leal	
28/6/2025	(Argentina) Franco Stupaczuk (Spain) Juan Lebrón	6–7 / 6–4 / 7–6	(Spain) Alejandro Galán (Argentina) Federico Chingotto	

Women's

Date	Winners	Score	Opponent	Refs.
28/6/2025	(Spain) Ariana Sánchez (Spain) Paula Josemaría	6–2 / 6–1	(Argentina) Aranzazu Osoro (Spain) Martina Calvo	
28/6/2025	(Spain) Bea González (Spain) Claudia Fernández	7–6 / 3–1 / W.O.	(Argentina) Delfina Brea (Spain) Gemma Triay	

=== Finals ===
Men's

Date	Winners	Score	Opponent	Refs.
29/6/2025	(Argentina) Agustín Tapia (Spain) Arturo Coello	7–5 / 6–4	(Argentina) Franco Stupaczuk (Spain) Juan Lebrón	

Women's

Date	Winners	Score	Opponent	Refs.
29/6/2025	(Spain) Ariana Sánchez (Spain) Paula Josemaría	6–4 / 7–5	(Spain) Bea González (Spain) Claudia Fernández	
