= Plaza Mayor, Valladolid =

Coordinates: 41°39′07″N 4°43′44″W

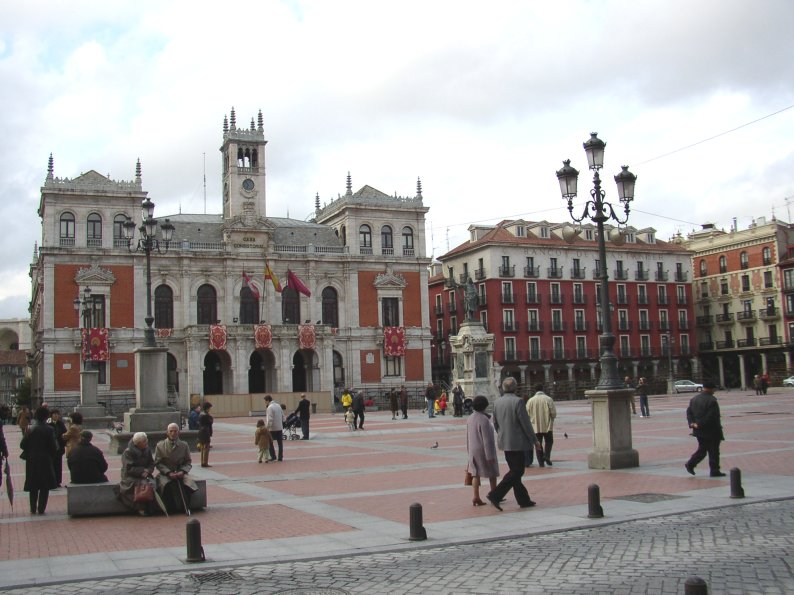
Plaza Mayor featuring the Town Hall, the seat of the City Council of Valladolid.

The Plaza Mayor (English: "Town square") is a central plaza in the city of Valladolid, Spain. It is located only a few blocks away from another famous plaza, the Plaza Zorrilla.

== History ==
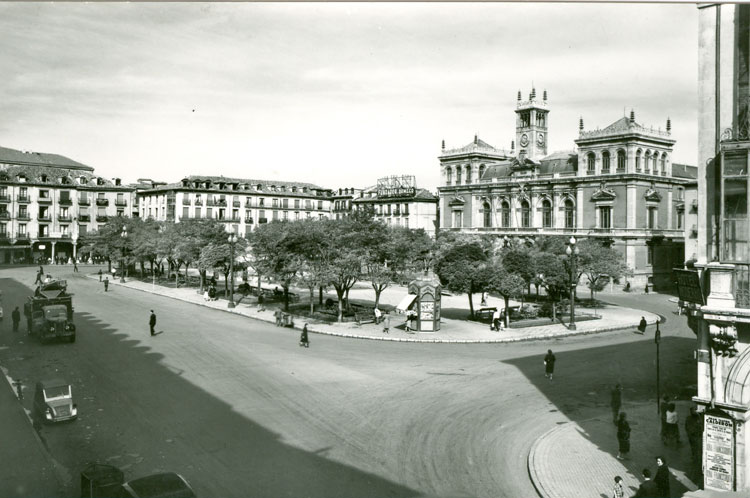
The Main Square in the 1950s.

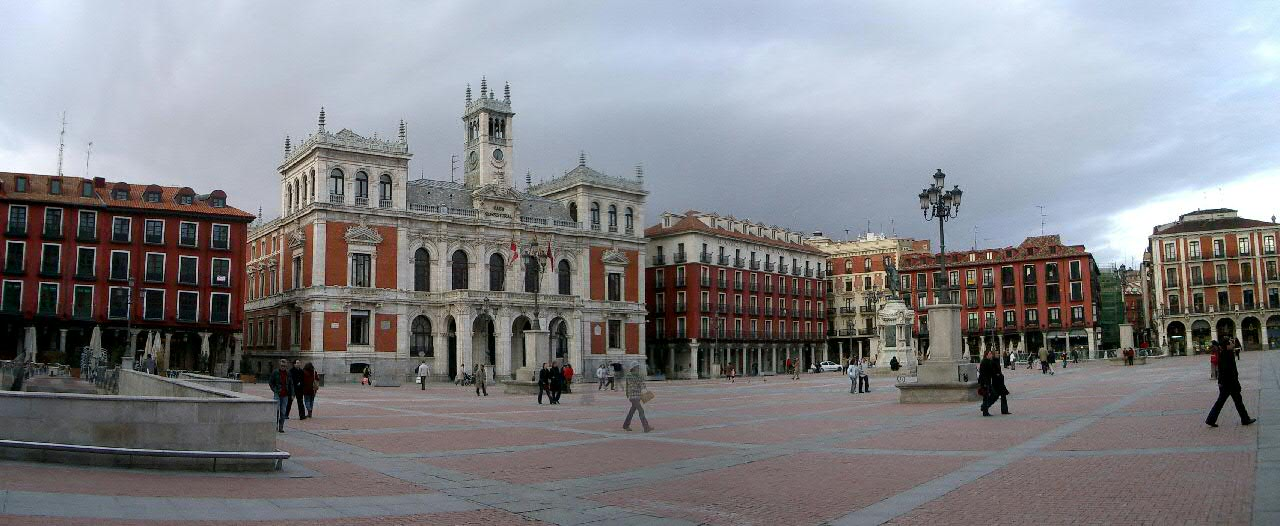
The Plaza Mayor ("Main Square") in the present.

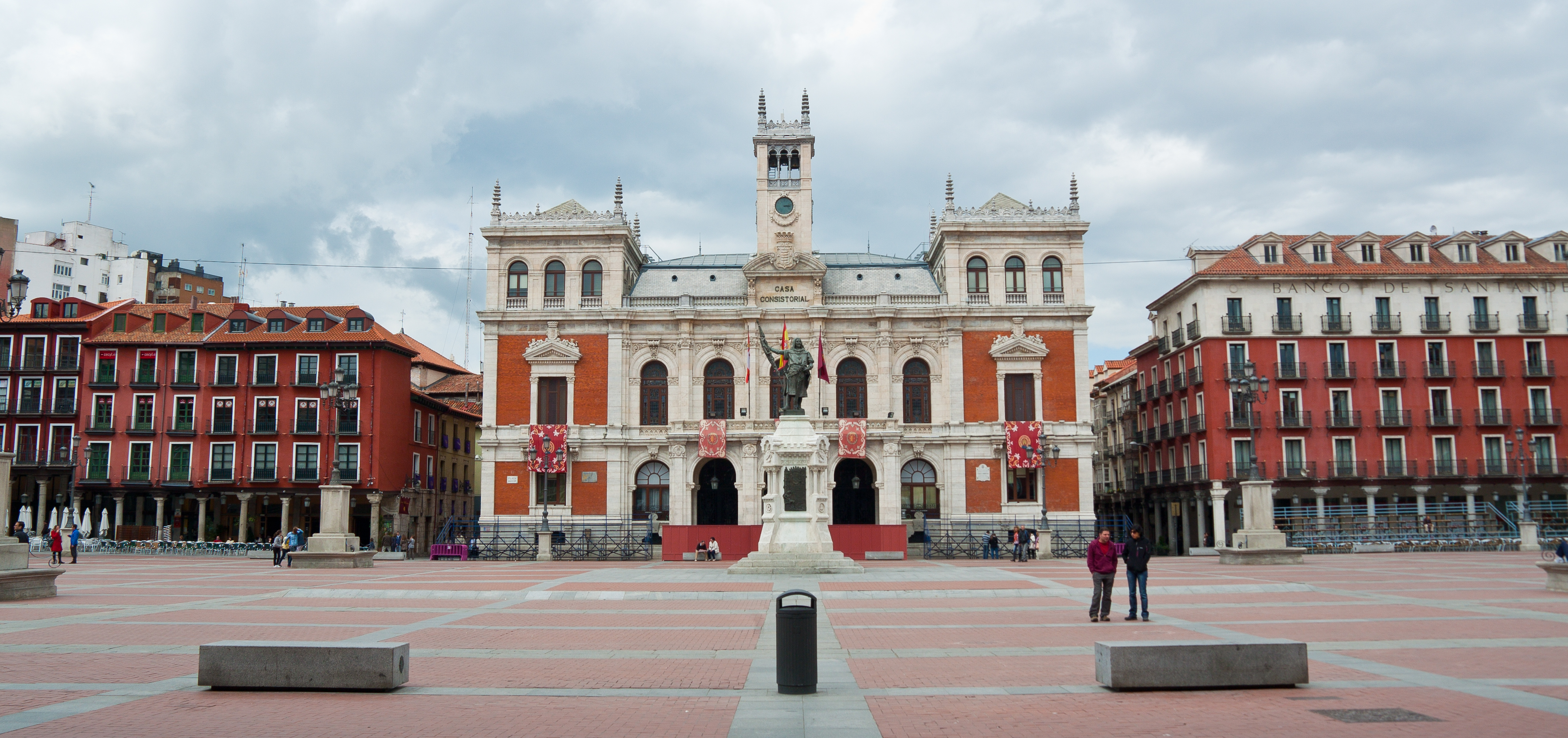
Main view of the square and the town hall.

Its existence became defined in the mid-thirteenth century when the market moved from the Plaza de Santa Maria to Market Square, which since the early sixteenth century has been called Plaza Mayor. Individual unions were installed around it, as was the Convent of San Francisco, until 1499 the most important building in the vicinity. After that date, as mandated by the Catholic Monarchs it was the House of the Municipality who presided over the life of the city.

After its destruction in 1561 because of a serious fire at the old Market Square and thanks to the direct intervention of Philip II, it became urbanized as a meeting place and marketplace of traders who came from all parts of the Kingdom.

The reconstruction project was the work of Francisco de Salamanca, royal architect. He gave birth to the modern town square in urban planning — a milestone for Spain and the Americas that it is a great contribution of the Spanish Baroque architecture.

The Plaza Mayor of Valladolid is the first great plaza in Spain, and closed with arcades, is a space intended for use as a market and as a backdrop to the public celebrations so dear to the Habsburg monarchy. It had been designed with large balconies to facilitate the viewing of the shows, and served as a model, since the seventeenth century, for many others in Spain (such as Madrid, 1617 or Salamanca, 1729) and South America, even having an impact in Italy.

== Details ==
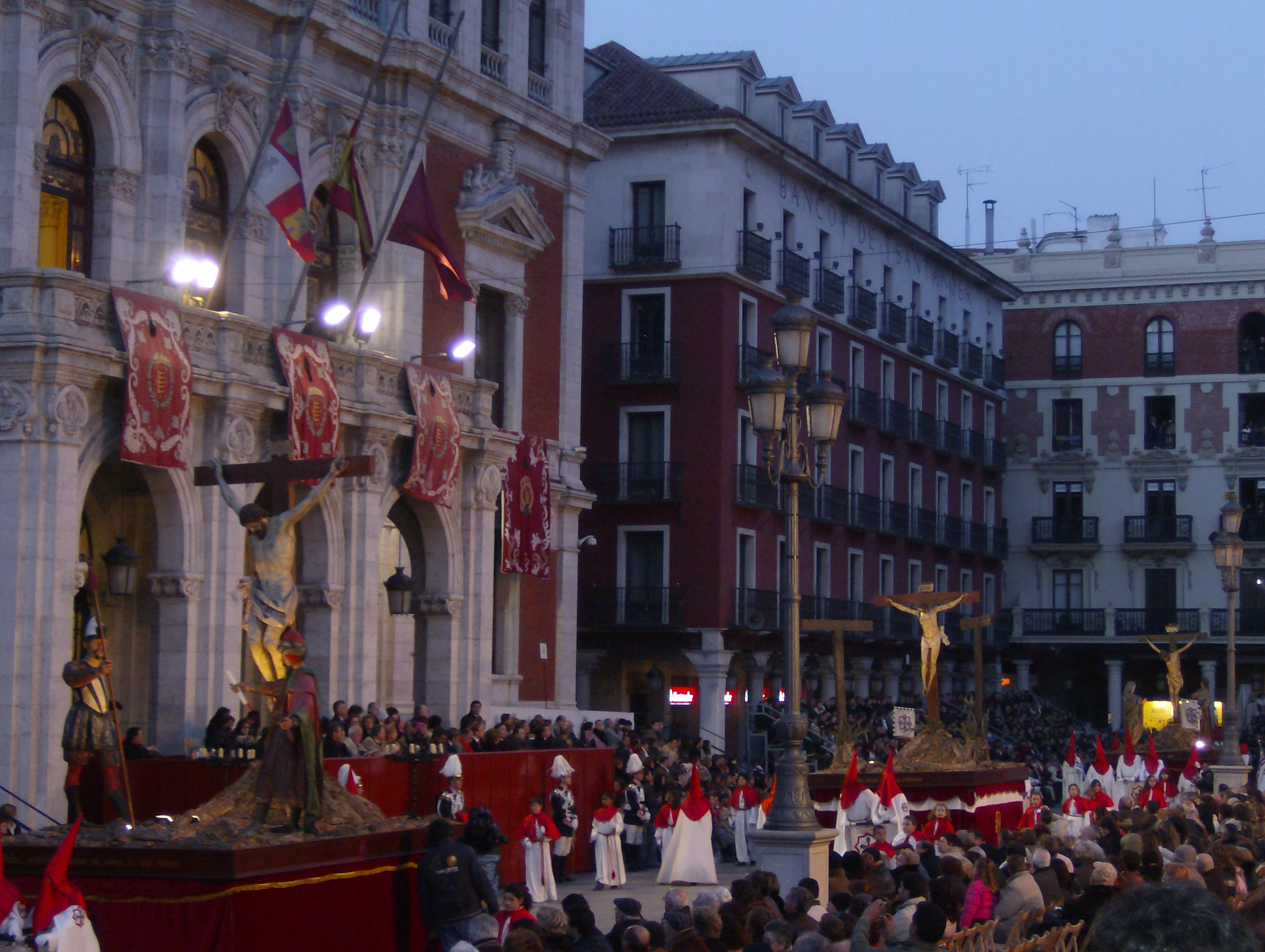
General Procession of Holy Week in Valladolid at Good Friday.

The plaza has a rectangular plan with completely arcaded porches which rest on columns or square granite pillars and is of the open type, i.e. the streets leading to it have no hindrance or screen. It is surrounded by narrow streets reminiscent of the past and is one of the largest in Spain.

Traditionally, the houses of the square had a height of three storeys. The distribution of voids was hierarchical. The first floor had balconies, the second railings, and the third, simple windows. This original appearance was changed over time until all floors had balconies. The Plaza Mayor is presided over by a statue of the founder of the city, Pedro Ansúrez designed by Aurelio Carretero and unveiled in 1903.

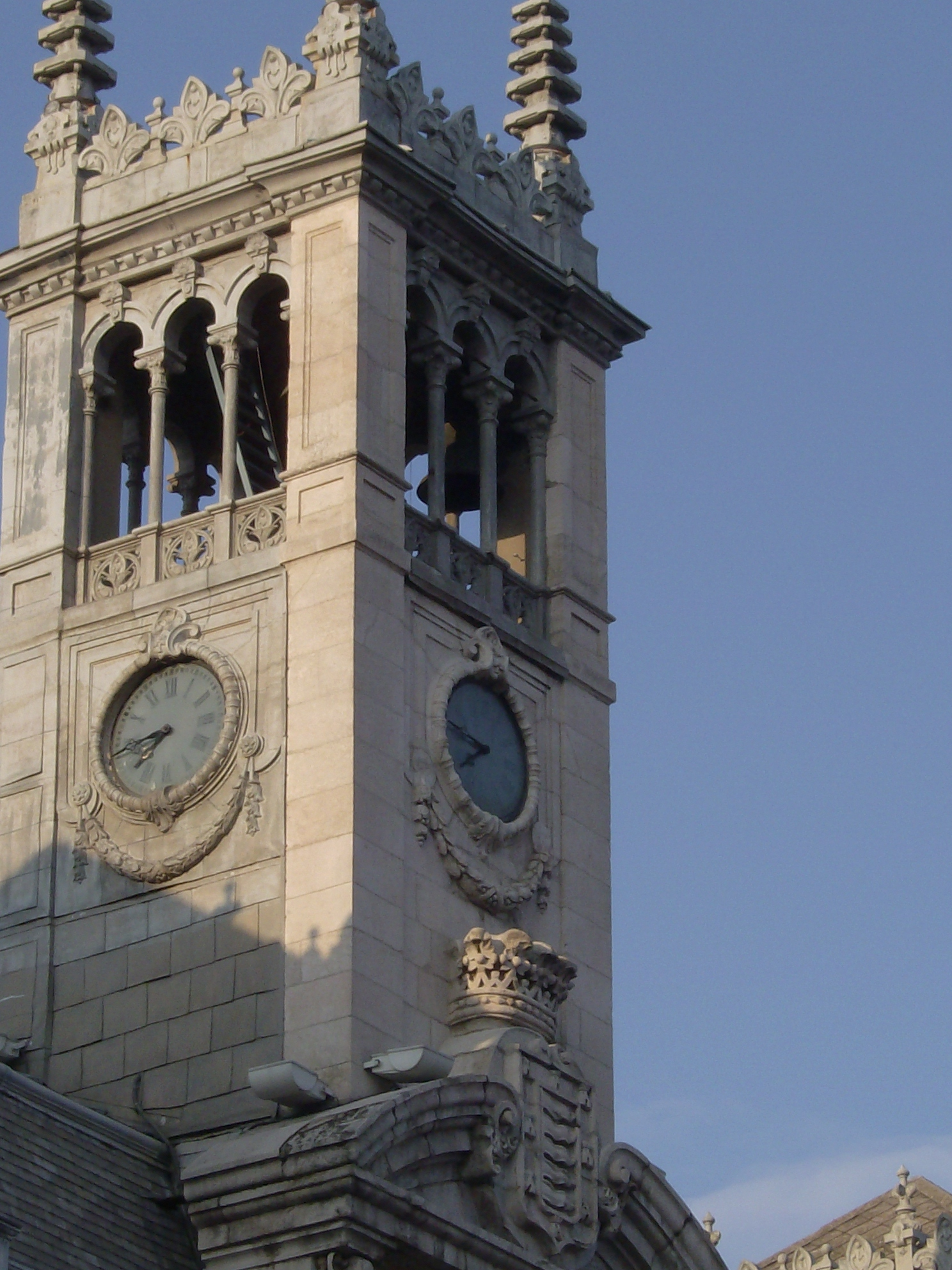
Clock tower of the town hall

On the northern flank of its rectangular layout, stands the Casa Consistorial, seat of the Town Hall of Valladolid. The previous building, dating from the sixteenth century survived until 1879, but had been reformed over time. For example, in the mid-nineteenth century, a tower for a clock was built in the center of the facade. The existing building had a long beginning. First there was a design contest for the new Consistory, a project won by the local architect Antonio Iturralde, who presented a draft that, while the winner, not well liked. Iturralde died in 1897 and Enrique Repullés and Vargas took over the work. The Iturralde draft was discarded and a new building of Beaux-Arts architecture was constructed and completed in 1908.

Facing this building is Zorrilla Theater, opened in 1884. It is situated on the original site of the Convent of San Francisco, the immense monastery, totally demolished between 1835 and 1850.

Lately there have been efforts to return to the original homogeneity through certain mechanisms (such as the red paint on all facades of the buildings) though some are historically and aesthetically questionable.

== See also ==
- Plaza
- Plaza Mayor, Salamanca
- Plaza Mayor, Madrid
