= Monument to Count Ansúrez =

Monument in Granada

Conde Ansúrez
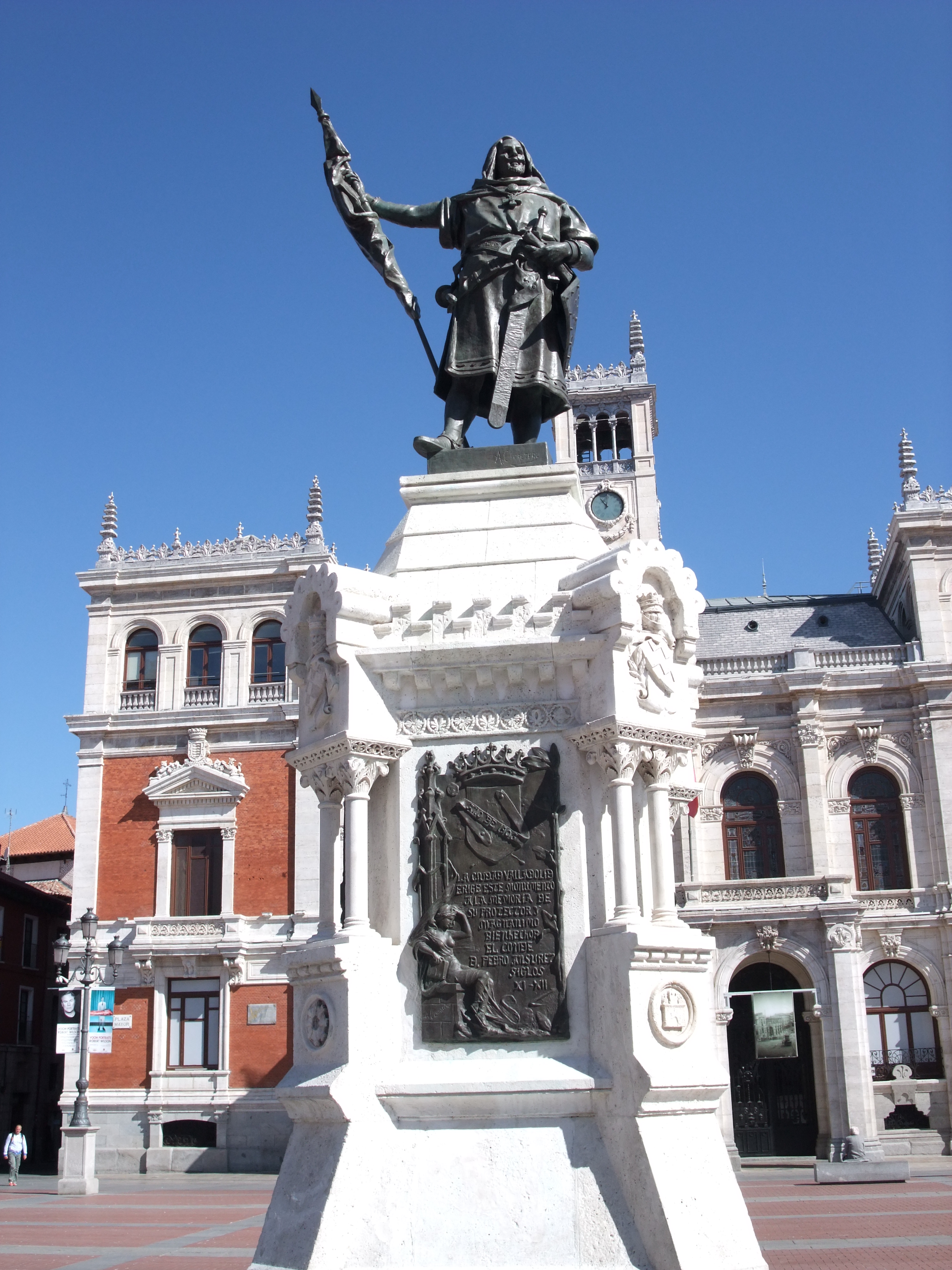
- 41.651978°N 4.728548°W
- Location: Plaza Mayor, Valladolid, Spain
- Designer: Aurelio Carretero (statue and reliefs); Juan Agapito y Revilla (pedestal)
- Material: Bronze, stone
- Opening date: 31 December 1903
- Dedicated to: Pedro Ansúrez

The Monument to Count Ansúrez is an instance of public art in Valladolid, Spain. Located at the Plaza Mayor, it consists of a bronze statue of Count Pedro Ansúrez, founder of the town of Valladolid in the 11th century, topping off a stone pedestal with additional sculptural elements.

== History and description ==
Predated by earlier failed attempts in the 19th century to erect a monument to the founder of the city, the project of the statue was entrusted in the early 20th century to Aurelio Carretero, who, having started works in January 1901, completed the cast in April 1901, using bronze donated by himself.

Standing about 2.60 m high, the statue of the Count raises the banner of Castile with the right hand, while the left hand grabs the scrolls entitling him as Lord of Valladolid, while also leaning on the handle of a broadsword.

The stone pedestal was designed by municipal architect Juan Agapito y Revilla. The bronze elements displayed on the sides of the pedestal (also a work by Carretero) include an allegory of history, a cartouche reading "la ciudad de valladolid erige este monumento a la memoria de su protector y magnánimo bienhechor el conde d. pedro ansúrez. siglos xi-xii" ("the city of Valladolid erects this monument to the memory of its protector and magnanimous benefactor Count D. Pedro Ansúrez. 12-13th centuries"), the arms of the city and two reliefs depicting episodes of the life of Ansúrez. It was unveiled on 31 December 1903.

The monument was temporarily stored in the 1970s and the 1990s during reform works in the plaza.
