= Móstoles =

- Municipality
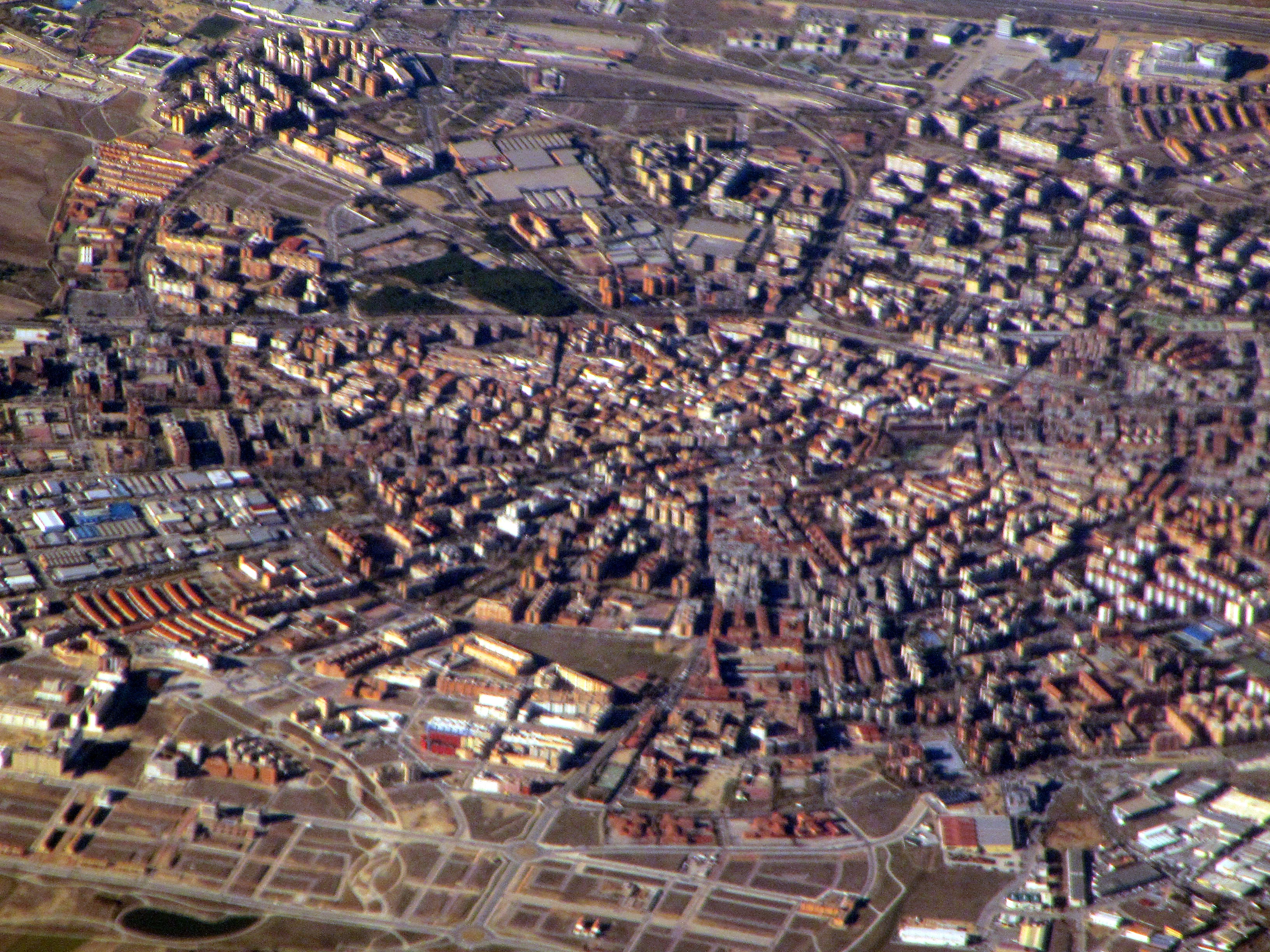

- Flag Coat of arms
- Location of Móstoles
- Coordinates: 40°20′0″N 3°52′0″W
- Country: Spain
- Region: Community of Madrid

Government
  - Type: Ayuntamiento
  - Body: Ayuntamiento de Móstoles
  - Mayor: Manuel Bautista (PP)

Area
  - Total: 45.36 km^{2} (17.51 sq mi)
- Elevation: 660 m (2,170 ft)

Population (2025-01-01)
  - Total: 214,817
  - Density: 4,736/km^{2} (12,270/sq mi)
- Demonym(s): Mostoleños, mostolenses, mostoleros
- Time zone: UTC+1 (CET)
  - Summer (DST): UTC+2 (CEST)
- Postal code: 28930 - 28939
- Website: www.mostoles.es

Móstoles (Spanish: [ˈmostoles]) is a municipality of Spain located in the Community of Madrid. With over 200,000 inhabitants, it is the region's second most populated municipality after Madrid. Móstoles was a small town for a long time, but expanded rapidly in the second half of the 20th century. It has a population of 214,817 inhabitants (INE, 2025).

The city also hosts the main campus of the Rey Juan Carlos University.

== Geography ==
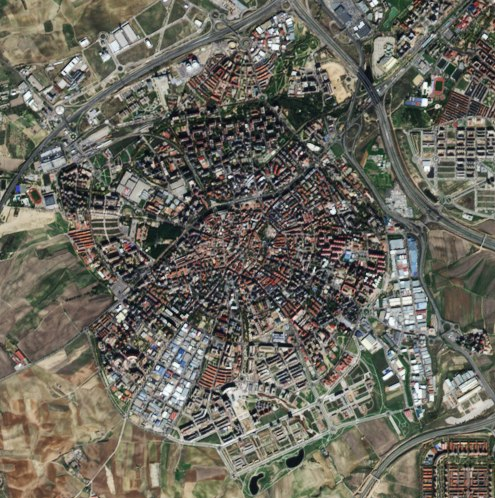
Móstoles as seen by the European Space Agency's Sentinel-2.

The municipality presents a largely flat relief. The main hydrographic features are the Guadarrama river at the western end of the municipality and several of the latter's left bank tributary creeks, including the Arroyo del Soto and the Arroyo de los Combos.

It lies at 660 metres above sea level.

== History ==
Human beings have been present since the Paleolithic. Evidence of that fact are sites in which there are flint gravel and arrow tips.

Some traces of presence of Roman civilisation occur in the current municipality, specifically of the late period. They mainly consist of ceramic remains.

There is no evidence of a town in the current Móstoles during the Islamic rule era in Iberian Peninsula. However, there are some remains of this era in the territory.

It was founded most probably circa 1085–1137, after the Christian conquest of the Kingdom of Toledo (1085) as it was not mentioned in the chronicles compiling the villages seized in the conquest. Written mentions to the village in the Middle Ages, since its foundation up to the late-15th century are limited. By the beginning of the 16th century, it was part of the Land of Toledo.

On 6 December 1565, Philip II issued a royal cédula granting Móstoles the independence from Toledo, becoming a town (villa) under realengo (directly owned by the monarch).

Móstoles became famous as, although it was only a small town, its municipal authorities called for a general rebellion against the French forces on 2 May 1808 immediately after the Dos de Mayo Uprising in the Spanish capital, reportedly issuing the following public announcement (bando) signed by the Mayor: "The homeland is in danger. Madrid is perishing, victim of the French perfidiousness. Spaniards, turn to save her".

The municipality experienced a slow and steady population growth during the first half of the 20th century, followed by a huge demographic expansion from the 1960s onwards.

== Demographics and administration ==
Historical population
Year	Pop.	±%
1842	1,550	—
1857	1,321	−14.8%
1877	1,288	−2.5%
1887	1,274	−1.1%
1900	1,342	+5.3%
1910	1,498	+11.6%
1920	1,554	+3.7%
1930	1,748	+12.5%
1940	1,858	+6.3%
1950	1,819	−2.1%
1960	2,578	+41.7%
1970	17,895	+594.1%
1981	150,259	+739.7%
1991	192,018	+27.8%
2001	196,524	+2.3%
2011	203,493	+3.5%
2021	208,632	+2.5%
Source: INE

There are two main localities: Móstoles, which is placed in the east of the municipality, and Parque-Coimbra, which is located in the southwest. The city had a population of 209,184 in 2019 and Parque-Coimbra is home to 10,747 people.

Some neighbourhoods are acknowledged by the town council and other by the autonomous community (region) of Madrid. However, very few are recognised by the Spanish Statistics Institute such as Pinares Llanos and Parque Guadarrama.

According to the town council, the neighbourhoods are El Soto, Villaeuropa, Pinares Llanos, Azorín, San Fernando and Soto Vicente. All are located in the south or west. According to Comunidad de Madrid, the neighbourhoods are Los Rosales and Estoril II, which are placed in the north; Móstoles Central and Estoril, which are located in the northwest; Pradillo, which occurs in the centre; Villafontana, which is placed in the east; Versalles, which is located in the southeast; La Barra and Manuela Malasaña, which occur in the south; Las Cumbres and Coveta, which are located in the west; and El Soto, which occurs in the northwest.

The administrative division of the municipality are the districts and there are 5, which are:

- District 1 - Centro
- District 2 - Norte-Universidad
- District 3 - Sur-Este
- District 4 - Sur-Oeste
- District 5 - Parque Coimbra-Colonia Guadarrama

Mayors

Thorough most of its modern democratic history, the municipality of Móstoles has been ruled by the Spanish Socialist Workers' Party of the Community of Madrid, belonging to the so-called "red belt" of the region. Only from 2003 to 2015 and again since 2023 the city has been ruled by the People's Party of the Community of Madrid.

List of Mayors
Term	Name	Party
1979-1991	Bartolomé González Llorente	PSOE-M
1991-1993	José Baigorri Moretín	PSOE-M
1993-1995	José Luis Gallego Picó	PSOE-M
1995-2003	José María Arteta Vico	PSOE-M
2003-2011	Esteban Parro del Prado	PPCM
2011-2015	Daniel Ortiz Espejo	PPCM
2015-2018	David Lucas	PSOE-M
2018-2023	Noelia Posse Gómez	PSOE-M
2023-current	Manuel Bautista Monjón	PPCM

== Economy ==
Agriculture and animal husbandry are hardly performed in the municipality. Only 0.2% of the GDP was collected from these activities in 2019. Mining, and industry activities equal 9.14% of that economic phenomenon in the same year. Building activities made the 8.63% of the money related to that economic measure. 11.9% of the registers of working people to an organism of the Welfare System in Spain named Tesorería General de la Seguridad Social, were due to posts in this sector.

The industrial estates in the municipality are Polígono Industrial El Lucero, in the northeast end; Polígono Industrial Los Rosales, in the northeast end; Prado Regordoño and Polígono Industrial la, in the east end; and Arroyomolinos, in the southern half.

== Education ==
Besides the university campus there are 34 public early childhood and primary education centres (CEIP) and 17 public secondary education centres (IES). 4 concertados (semiprivate or quasiprivate) centres are also located in the municipality. A centre for vocational education (CIFP) can also be found in Móstoles.

The campus includes the Higher School of Experimental Sciences and Technology, where people can choose among 13 degrees and 8 double degrees; the Higher Technical school of Computer Engineering, which includes 6 degrees and 6 double degrees; and the Faculty of social and legal sciences, where there are 9 degrees and 7 double degrees.

An adult education centre and a centre of the national language teaching institution are also located in the municipality.

== Main sights ==
=== Historical landmarks ===
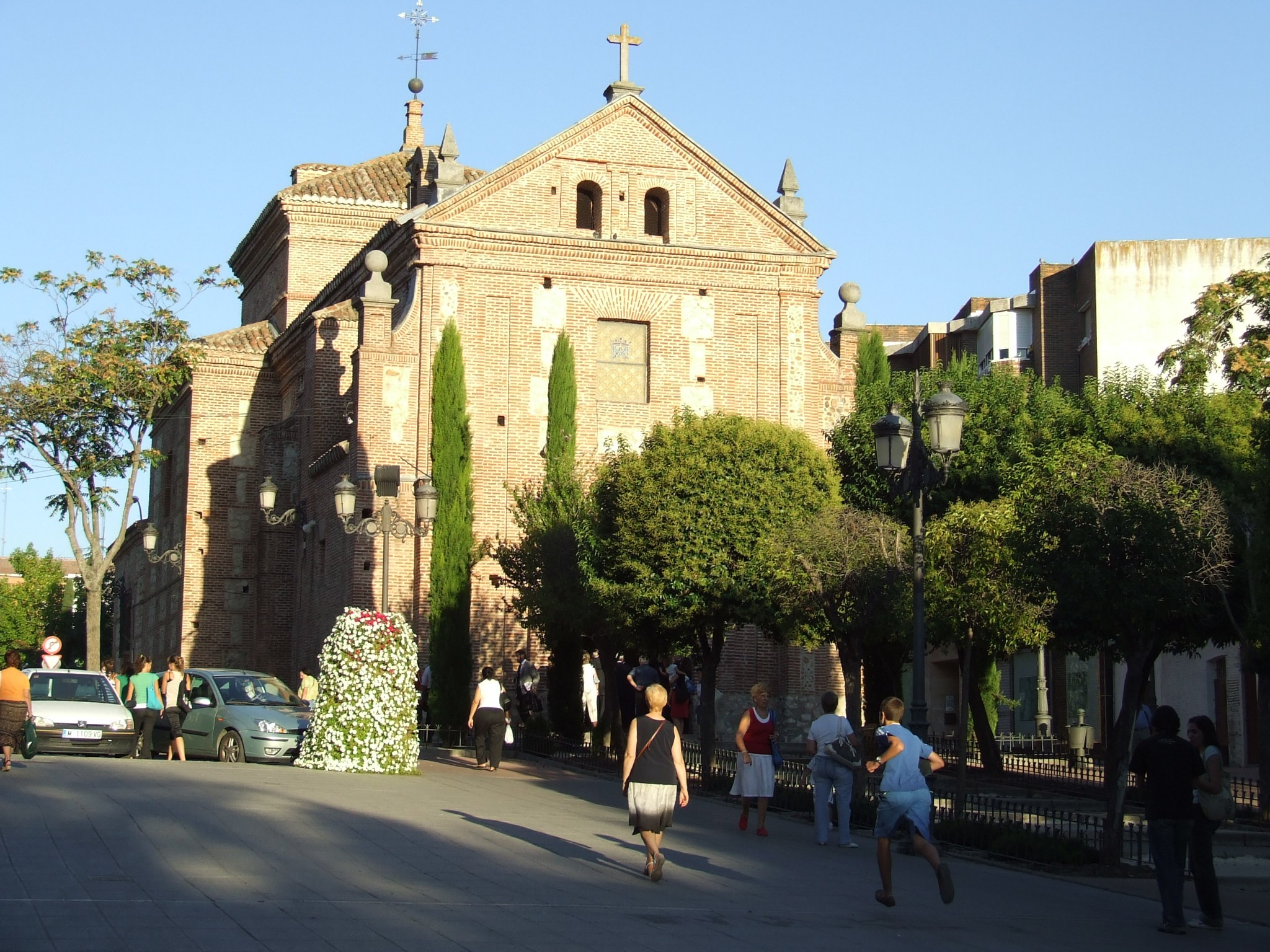
Hermitage

Two of the most architectural landmarks in Móstoles are churches; the church of La Asunción de Nuestra Señora (whose construction dates back to the 13th century) features a Mudéjar apse. The Baroque hermitage of La Virgen de los Santos dates from the 17th century.

There is a sculpture by Aurelio Carretero paying homage to Andrés Torrejón inaugurated in 1908 to mark the one hundredth anniversary of the Dos de Mayo uprising.

=== Museums and galleries ===
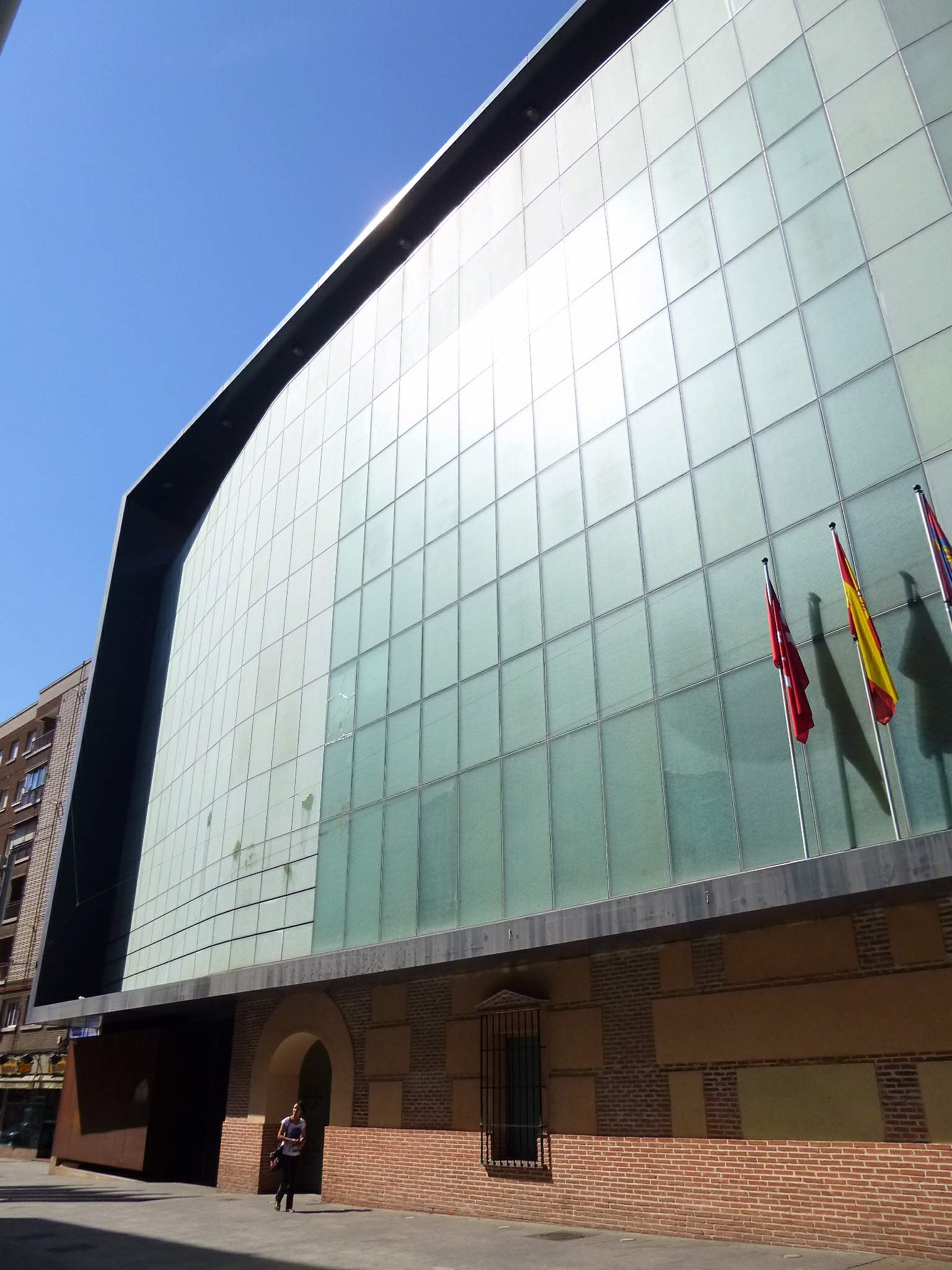
Façade of the CA2M

Móstoles is the home of the Community of Madrid's modern art gallery, the Centro de Arte Dos de Mayo (CA2M). It was opened in 2008 to mark the two hundredth anniversary of the Dos de Mayo uprising.

The residence of Andrés Torrejón was rehabilitated by the city council and turned into a museum.

== Cycling ==
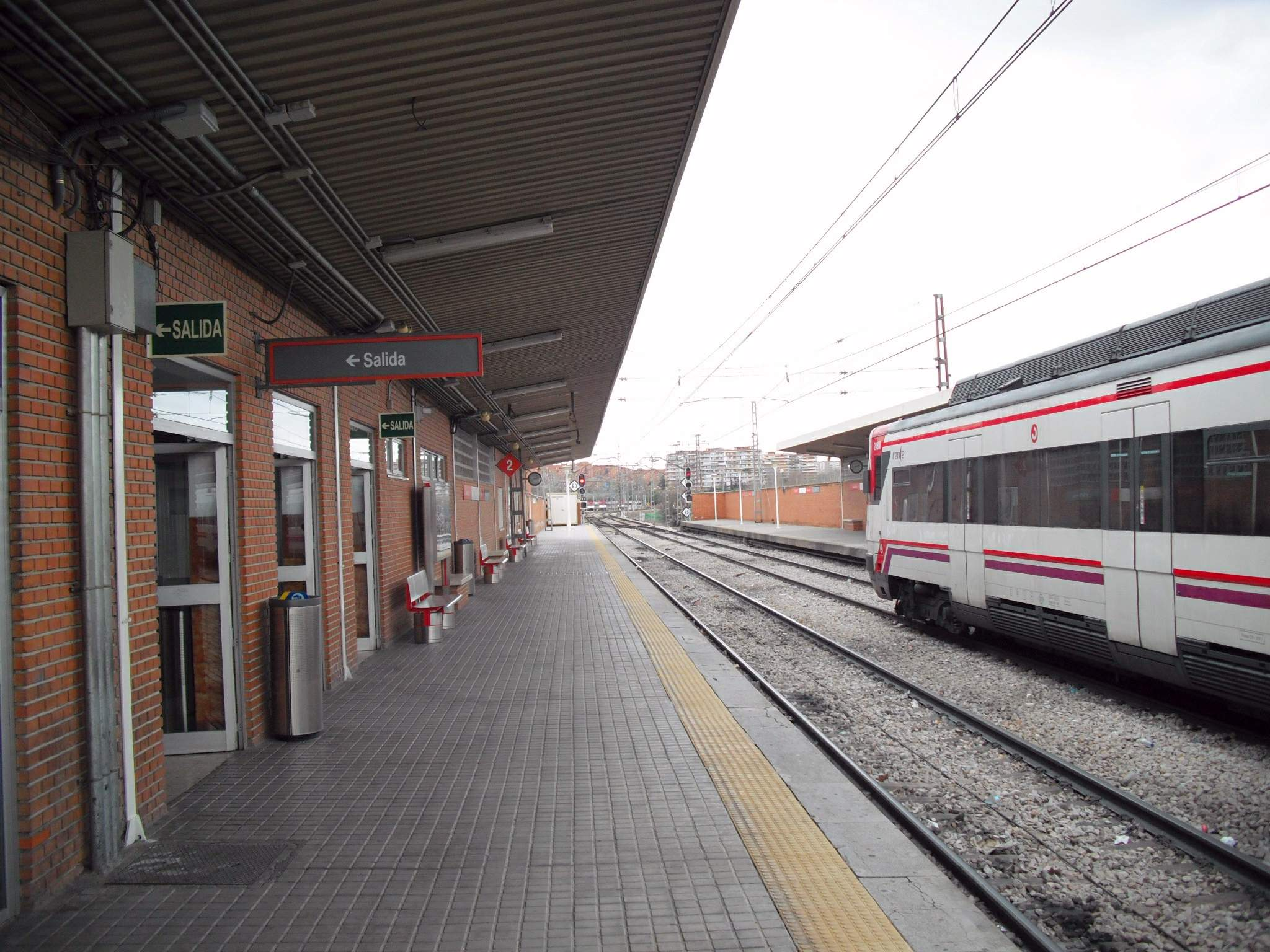
Móstoles-El Soto railway station

There is cycling infrastructure (Spanish: aceras bici, "bike-sidewalks") within central Móstoles. Funds were made available in 2017 to upgrade these cycleways.

== Sport ==
- Ciudad de Móstoles FS
- Estadio El Soto
- CD Móstoles
- CD Móstoles URJC
- FS Móstoles
- Móstoles CF

== See also ==
- Hermitage of Nuestra Señora de los Santos, cultural heritage hermitage
