= David Lucas (Spanish politician) =

Spanish politician (1968–2026)

David Lucas Parrón
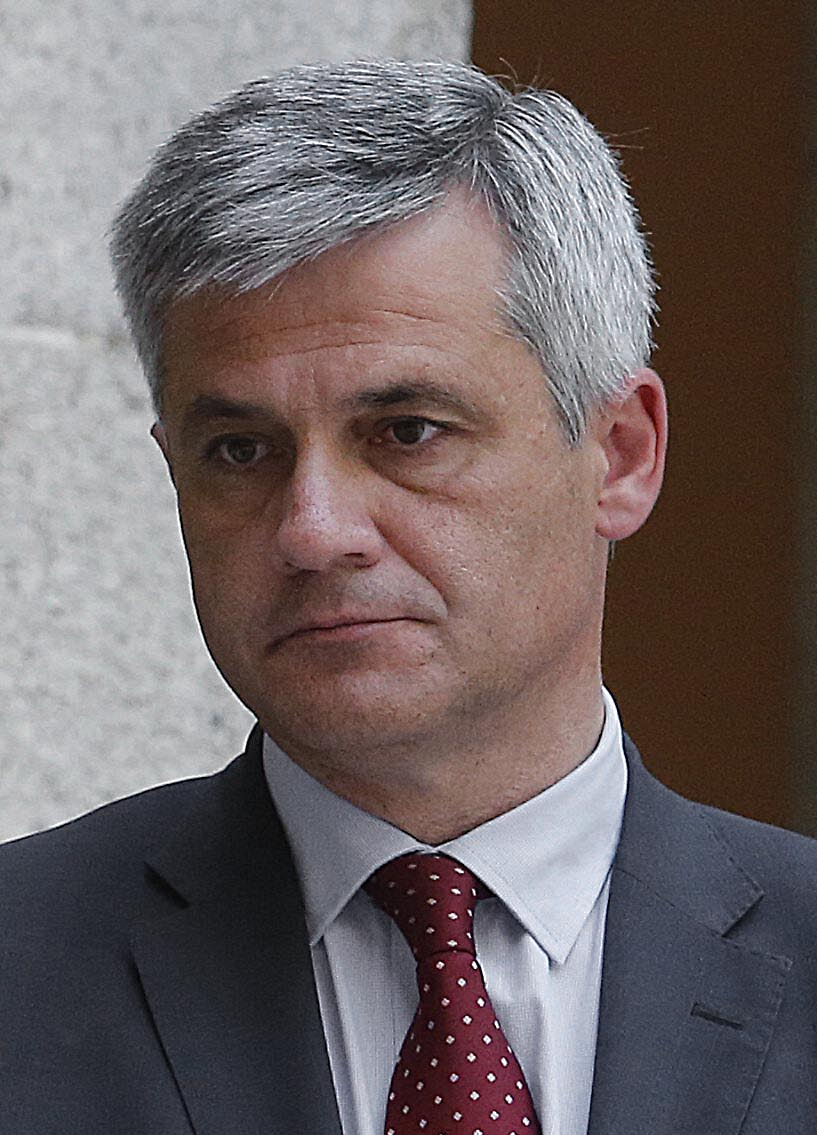
- Lucas in 2015

Member of the Senate
- In office 26 June 2016 – 21 May 2019
- Constituency: Madrid

Personal details
- Born: 18 January 1968 Madrid, Spain
- Died: 20 July 2026 (aged 58)
- Party: Spanish Socialist Workers' Party

Francisco David Lucas Parrón (18 January 1968 – 20 July 2026) was a Spanish politician who served as secretary of state for housing and urban agenda from 2023 until his death in 2026. From February to November 2023, he served as secretary of state for transport, mobility and urban agenda. From 2020 to 2023, he served as secretary general for housing and urban agenda. From 2016 to 2019, he was a member of the Senate. From 2015 to 2018, he served as mayor of Móstoles.

Lucas died of cancer on 20 July 2026, at the age of 58. He was subsequently awarded the Grand Cross of the Order of Civil Merit posthumously.
