= Ciudad de Móstoles FS =

Spanish futsal club

Ciudad de Móstoles
- Full name: Club Deportivo Elemental Ciudad de Móstoles Fútbol Sala
- Founded: 2009
- Ground: Villafontana, Móstoles, Community of Madrid, Spain
- Capacity: 2,000
- Chairman: (Spain) Óscar Burgos
- Manager: (Spain) Antonio Santa
- League: Unenrolled
- 2013–14: 2ª División B – Group 4, 12th
Home colours	Away colours

Ciudad de Móstoles Fútbol Sala is a futsal club based in Móstoles.

== History ==
The club was founded in 2009 after FS Móstoles was disbanded. Youth teams of FS Móstoles were moved to Ciudad de Móstoles FS. Senior team was created in 2009–10 season.

From 2014–15 season, the club only compete with youth teams, disenrolling the first team that had played in Segunda División B in 2013–14 season.

=== club names ===
- Boadilla Las Rozas/Móstoles Mirasierra - (2009–10)
- Las Rozas Boadilla/Móstoles - (2010–11)
- Ciudad de Móstoles - (2011– )

== Season to season ==
Season	Tier	Division	Place	Notes
2009/10	3	1ª Nacional A	2nd	
2010/11	3	1ª Nacional A	1st	
2011/12	3	2ª División B	8th	
2012/13	3	2ª División B	6th	
2013/14	3	2ª División B	12th	

- 5 seasons in Segunda División B
