= Hermitage of Nuestra Señora de los Santos =

Hermitage in Móstoles, Spain

- Ermita de Nuestra Señora de los Santos (Spanish)
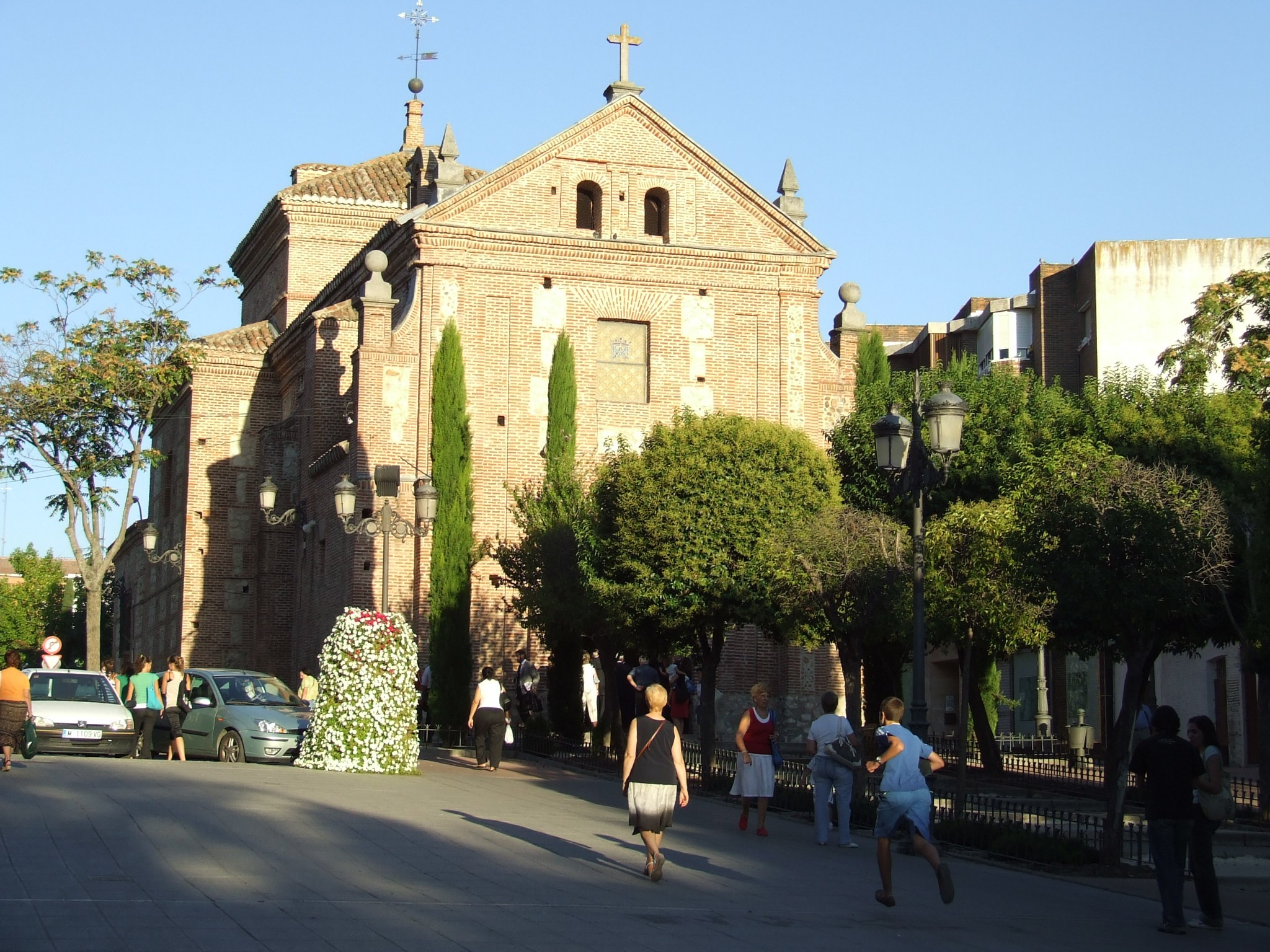

- Location within Spain
- 40.322453°N 3.862768°W
- Location: Móstoles, Spain

Spanish Cultural Heritage
- Official name: Ermita de Nuestra Señora de los Santos
- Type: Non-movable
- Criteria: Monument
- Designated: 1994
- Reference no.: RI-51-0008658

The Hermitage of Nuestra Señora de los Santos (Spanish: Ermita de Nuestra Señora de los Santos) is a hermitage located in Móstoles, Spain.

The building is baroque in style. The exterior shows some mudéjar influence. It was declared Bien de Interés Cultural in 1994.
