= 2024 Valladolid P2 =

Padel championships

- Date: 14 – 22 September
- Edition: 1st
- Category: P2
- Prize money: €250.000
- Location: Valladolid, Spain
- Venue: Pabellón Polideportivo Pisuerga

Champions
- Men's doubles: (Argentina) Agustín Tapia (Spain) Arturo Coello
- Women's doubles: (Spain) Ariana Sánchez (Spain) Paula Josemaría

Chronology

The 2024 Valladolid P2 (officially 2024 Oysho Valladolid Premier Padel P2) was the seventeenth tournament of the third season organized by Premier Padel, promoted by the International Padel Federation, and with the financial backing of Nasser Al-Khelaïfi's Qatar Sports Investments, now serving as the premier padel circuit.

In the women's category, the top two pairs met in the final once again, with Claudia Fernández and Gemma Triay avenging their loss to Ariana Sánchez and Paula Josemaría in the previous tournament to claim their fourth title of 2024.

In the men's category, the top two pairs in the FIP rankings reprised the final of the last two tournaments, with Agustín Tapia and Arturo Coello once again defeating Alejandro Galán and Federico Chingotto to claim their ninth title of 2024.

== Relevant Data ==
=== Hometown winner ===
The victory by Arturo Coello and Agustín Tapia gave Coello his first trophy won in his home town.

=== Belasteguín last partner ===
After the Paris Major, Fernando Belasteguín and Juan Tello parted ways. Belasteguín chose Valentino Libaak as his partner for the final tournaments before his retirement, while Tello chose Iñigo Jofre.

Libaak's former partner, Victor Ruiz, teamed with Sanyo Gutiérrez, while Sanyo's partner, Alex Arroyo, joined forces with Aléx Ruiz.

== Seeds ==
Male

Rnk.	Team	FIP Ranking Points
1	(Argentina) Agustín Tapia (Spain) Arturo Coello	27027
2	(Spain) Alejandro Galán (Argentina) Federico Chingotto	22448
3	(Spain) Juan Lebrón (Argentina) Martin Di Nenno	16792
4	(Argentina) Franco Stupaczuk (Spain) Miguel Yanguas	11515
5	(Spain) Pablo Cardona (Spain) Paquito Navarro	8563
6	(Spain) Aléx Ruiz (Spain) Javi Garrido	7159
7	(Spain) Coki Nieto (Spain) Jon Sanz	6860
8	(Argentina) Fernando Belasteguín (Argentina) Juan Tello	6641
9	(Spain) Eduardo Alonso (Spain) Momo Gonzalez	6381
10	(Spain) Alejandro Arroyo (Argentina) Sanyo Gutiérrez	5812
11	(Argentina) Lucho Capra (Argentina) Maxi Sanchéz	4166
12	(Spain) Juanlu Esbri (Brazil) Lucas Bergamini	4149
13	(Spain) Javier Leal (Brazil) Lucas Campagnolo	3454
14	(Argentina) Valentino Libaak (Spain) Victor Ruiz	3061
15	(Spain) Gonzalo Rubio (Spain) Pablo Lijó	2554
16	(Spain) Javier Barahona (Spain) Teodoro Zapata	2516

Female

Rnk.	Team	FIP Ranking Points
1	(Spain) Ariana Sanchez (Spain) Paula Josemaria	26496
2	(Spain) Claudia Fernandez (Spain) Gemma Triay	17201
3	(Spain) Marta Ortega (Portugal) Sofia Araújo	11043
4	(Spain) Andrea Ustero (Argentina) Delfina Brea	10600
5	(Spain) Alejandra Salazar (Spain) Jessica Castello	9472
6	(Spain) Lucia Sainz (Spain) Patty Llaguno	9183
7	(Argentina) Aranzazu Osoro (Spain) Veronica Virseda	6642
8	(Portugal) Ana Catarina Nogueira (Argentina) Claudia Jensen	5841
9	(Spain) Carmen Goenaga (Argentina) Virginia Riera	5783
10	(Italy) Carolina Orsi (Spain) Nuria Rodriguez	3252
11	(Russia) Ksenia Sharifova (Spain) Lucia Martinez	3193
12	(Spain) Beatriz Caldera (Spain) Lorena Rufo	3155
13	(Spain) Marina Guinart (Spain) Victoria Iglesias	2937
14	(Spain) Carla Mesa (Spain) Sara Ruiz	2555
15	(Spain) Barbara Las Heras (Spain) Marta Marrero	2465
16	(France) Alix Collombon (Spain) Araceli Martinez	2423

== Head-to-head record between teams ranked in the top 4 during the season ==
=== Man's ===
Record	Coello–Tapia	Galán–Chingotto	Lebrón–Di Nenno	Stupaczuk–Yanguas	Former Pairs	Galán–Lebrón	Paquito–Sanyo	Lebrón–Paquito	Di Nenno–Stupaczuk
Coello–Tapia	—	7–5	2–0	—		1–1	2–0	4–0	1–0
Galán–Chingotto	5–7	—	—	1–0		—	—	1–0	7–0
Lebrón–Di Nenno	0–2	—	—	—		—	—	—	—
Stupaczuk–Yanguas	—	0–1	—	—		—	—	—	—
Former Pairs									
Galán–Lebrón	1–1	—	—	—		—	—	—	2–0
Paquito–Sanyo	0–2	—	—	—		—	—	—	—
Lebrón–Paquito	0–4	0–1	—	—		—	—	—	0–1
Di Nenno–Stupaczuk	0–1	0–7	—	—		0–2	—	1–0	—

=== Women's ===
Record	Ariana–Paula	Fernandez–Triay	Gonzalez–D. Brea	Araújo–Ortega	Former Pairs	Icardo–Salazar	Ortega–Triay	Ortega–Virseda
Ariana–Paula	—	5–5	2–1	2–1		1–0	—	1–0
Fernandez–Triay	5–5	—	2–3	1–0		0–1	—	1–0
B. Gonzalez–D. Brea	1–2	3–2	—	1–0		3–0	—	—
Araújo–Ortega	1–2	0–1	0–1	—		—	—	—
Former Pairs								
Icardo–Salazar	0–1	1–0	0–3	—		—	—	—
Ortega–Triay	—	—	—	—		—	—	—
Ortega–Virseda	0–1	0–1	—	—		—	—	—

== Draws ==
=== Men's Bracket ===
Round of 32
1	(Spain) Coello / (Argentina) Tapia	6	6
24	(Spain) A. Ayats / (Spain) E. Goenaga	3	4
Q	(Spain) G. Losada / (Spain) J. Martinez	5	2
15	(Spain) G. Rubio / (Spain) P. Lijó	7	6
11	(Argentina) L. Capra / (Argentina) Maxi	6	6	6
18	(Spain) I. Sager / (Spain) S. Oria	3	7	7
Q	(Argentina) F. Mouriño / (Spain) M. Quilez	3	0
7	(Spain) Coki / (Spain) J. Sanz	6	6
8	(Argentina) Belasteguin / (Argentina) J. Tello	3	4
14	(Argentina) V. Libaak / (Spain) V. Ruiz	6	6
Q	(Spain) I. Jofre / (Spain) L. Quesada	1	1
9	(Spain) E. Alonso / (Spain) Momo	6	6
17	(Spain) F. Guerrero / (Spain) J. Bautista	4	6	6
19	(Argentina) J.C. Belluati / (Argentina) R. Moyano	6	3	2
WC	(Sweden) D. Windahl / (Chile) J. Valdes	6	2
3	(Argentina) Di Nenno / (Spain) Lebrón	7	6
4	(Argentina) Stupaczuk / (Spain) Yanguas	6	6
Q	(Italy) F. Abbate / (Italy) G. Graziotti	4	4
23	(Spain) J. Muñoz / (Spain) J.G. Mora	4	2
12	(Spain) J. Esbri / (Brazil) L. Bergamini	6	6
22	(Argentina) A. Gutiérrez / (Spain) J. Rico	6	4
13	(Spain) J. Leal / (Brazil) L. Campagnolo	7	6
27	(Spain) A. Lancha / (Spain) P.G. Rodrigo	6	3	4
5	(Spain) P. Cardona / (Spain) Paquito	4	6	6
6	(Spain) A. Ruiz / (Spain) J. Garrido	6	3	6
25	(Spain) A. Cepero / (Spain) M. Benitez	4	6	3
20	(Argentina) A. Chozas / (Argentina) L. Augsburger	6	*
10	(Spain) A. Arroyo / (Argentina) Sanyo	6
21	(Spain) J. Rico / (Spain) R. Mendez	6	7	6
WC	(Spain) B. Garcia / (Spain) R. Coello	7	6	3
16	(Spain) J. Barahona / (Spain) T. Zapata	3	4
2	(Spain) Galán / (Argentina) F. Chingotto	6	6

Round of 16
1	(Spain) Coello / (Argentina) Tapia	6	6
15	(Spain) G. Rubio / (Spain) P. Lijó	4	4
18	(Spain) I. Sager / (Spain) S. Oria	3	3
7	(Spain) Coki / (Spain) J. Sanz	6	6
14	(Argentina) V. Libaak / (Spain) V. Ruiz	3	5
9	(Spain) E. Alonso / (Spain) Momo	6	7
17	(Spain) F. Guerrero / (Spain) J. Bautista	3	6	3
3	(Argentina) Di Nenno / (Spain) Lebrón	6	3	6
4	(Argentina) Stupaczuk / (Spain) Yanguas	4	6	6
12	(Spain) J. Esbri / (Brazil) L. Bergamini	6	2	7
13	(Spain) J. Leal / (Brazil) L. Campagnolo	4	6
5	(Spain) P. Cardona / (Spain) Paquito	6	7
6	(Spain) A. Ruiz / (Spain) J. Garrido	1	6	6
20	(Argentina) A. Chozas / (Argentina) L. Augsburger	6	3	7
21	(Spain) J. Rico / (Spain) R. Mendez	6	3
2	(Spain) Galán / (Argentina) F. Chingotto	7	6

Quarter-Final
1	(Spain) Coello / (Argentina) Tapia	6	6
7	(Spain) Coki / (Spain) J. Sanz	3	4
9	(Spain) E. Alonso / (Spain) Momo	3	4
3	(Argentina) Di Nenno / (Spain) Lebrón	6	6
12	(Spain) J. Esbri / (Brazil) L. Bergamini	3	6
5	(Spain) P. Cardona / (Spain) Paquito	6	7
20	(Argentina) A. Chozas / (Argentina) L. Augsburger	3	4
2	(Spain) Galán / (Argentina) F. Chingotto	6	6

Semi-Finals
1	(Spain) Coello / (Argentina) Tapia	6	6
3	(Argentina) Di Nenno / (Spain) Lebrón	2	2
5	(Spain) P. Cardona / (Spain) Paquito	4	6
2	(Spain) Galán / (Argentina) F. Chingotto	6	7

Finals
1	(Spain) Coello / (Argentina) Tapia	6	4	6
2	(Spain) Galán / (Argentina) F. Chingotto	4	6	3

=== Women's Bracket ===
Round of 32
1	(Spain) A. Sanchez / (Spain) P. Josemaria	6	6
Bye
7	(Spain) A. Gallardo / (Italy) C. Casali	6	7	2
16	(France) A. Collombon / (Spain) A. Martinez	7	6	6
20	(Spain) M. Lobo / (Spain) S. Saiz	6	7	2
11	(Russia) K. Sharifova / (Spain) L. Martinez	7	6	6
21	(Spain) M.R. Abajo / (Spain) S. Bellver	1	6
8	(Portugal) A. Nogueira / (Argentina) C. Jensen	6	7
LL	(Spain) M. Barrera / (Spain) M. Caparros	2	5
13	(Spain) M. Guinart / (Spain) V. Iglesias	6	7
WC	(Spain) L. Trella / (Spain) N. Lopez	2	2
12	(Spain) B. Caldera / (Spain) L. Rufo	6	6
23	(Spain) A. Perez / (Spain) P. Martinez	4	0
9	(Spain) C. Goenaga / (Argentina) V. Riera	6	6
Bye
3	(Spain) M. Ortega / (Portugal) S. Araújo
4	(Spain) A. Ustero / (Argentina) D. Brea
Bye
LL	(Spain) A. Cañellas / (Sweden) C. Navarro	4	4
Q	(Spain) J. Bautista / (Spain) L. Arruabarrena	6	6
17	(Spain) J. Velasco / (Spain) N. Canovas	7	4	2
19	(Spain) E. Carnicero / (Spain) M. Merino	6	6	6
10	(Italy) C. Orsi / (Spain) N. Rodriguez	6	7	7
7	(Argentina) A. Osoro / (Spain) V. Virseda	7	5	5
6	(Spain) L. Sainz / (Spain) P. Llaguno	6	6	6
15	(Spain) B. Las Heras / (Spain) M. Marrero	7	4	0
18	(Argentina) J. Bidahorria / (Spain) M. Talavan	7	6
Q	(Spain) N. Aguilar / (Spain) T. Navarro	6	3
Q	(Spain) M. Borrero / (Spain) M. Santamaria	6	6
14	(Spain) C. Mesa / (Spain) S. Ruiz	4	1
Bye
2	(Spain) C. Fernandez / (Spain) G. Triay

Round of 16
1	(Spain) A. Sanchez / (Spain) P. Josemaria	6	6
16	(France) A. Collombon / (Spain) A. Martinez	0	1
11	(Russia) K. Sharifova / (Spain) L. Martinez	2	4
8	(Portugal) A. Nogueira / (Argentina) C. Jensen	6	6
13	(Spain) M. Guinart / (Spain) V. Iglesias	4	6	5
12	(Spain) B. Caldera / (Spain) L. Rufo	6	3	7
9	(Spain) C. Goenaga / (Argentina) V. Riera	0	6
4	(Spain) M. Ortega / (Portugal) S. Araújo	6	7
4	(Spain) A. Ustero / (Argentina) D. Brea	4	6	6
Q	(Spain) J. Bautista / (Spain) L. Arruabarrena	6	0	3
19	(Spain) E. Carnicero / (Spain) M. Merino	6	2	6
10	(Italy) C. Orsi / (Spain) N. Rodriguez	3	6	2
6	(Spain) L. Sainz / (Spain) P. Llaguno	6	6
18	(Argentina) J. Bidahorria / (Spain) M. Talavan	3	4
Q	(Spain) M. Borrero / (Spain) M. Santamaria	0	2
2	(Spain) C. Fernandez / (Spain) G. Triay	6	6

Quarter-Final
1	(Spain) A. Sanchez / (Spain) P. Josemaria	5	*
8	(Portugal) A. Nogueira / (Argentina) C. Jensen	2
12	(Spain) B. Caldera / (Spain) L. Rufo	3	1
4	(Spain) M. Ortega / (Portugal) S. Araújo	6	6
4	(Spain) A. Ustero / (Argentina) D. Brea	6	6
19	(Spain) E. Carnicero / (Spain) M. Merino	2	2
6	(Spain) L. Sainz / (Spain) P. Llaguno	4	2
2	(Spain) C. Fernandez / (Spain) G. Triay	6	6

Semi-Finals
1	(Spain) A. Sanchez / (Spain) P. Josemaria	6	6
4	(Spain) M. Ortega / (Portugal) S. Araújo	2	3
4	(Spain) A. Ustero / (Argentina) D. Brea	4	3
2	(Spain) C. Fernandez / (Spain) G. Triay	6	6

Finals
1	(Spain) A. Sanchez / (Spain) P. Josemaria	3	2
2	(Spain) C. Fernandez / (Spain) G. Triay	6	6

== Results ==
=== Round of 32 ===
Men's

Date	Winners	Score	Opponent	Refs.
18/9/2024	(Argentina) Agustín Tapia (Spain) Arturo Coello	6–3 / 6–4	(Spain) Arnau Ayats (Spain) Enrique Goenaga	
17/9/2024	(Spain) Gonzalo Rubio (Spain) Pablo Lijó	7–5 / 6–2	(Spain) Guillermo Collado (Spain) Javi Martinez Vazquez	
17/9/2024	(Spain) Ignacio Sager (Spain) Salvador Oria	3–6 / 7–6 / 7–6	(Argentina) Lucho Capra (Argentina) Maxi Sánchez	
17/9/2024	(Spain) Coki Nieto (Spain) Jon Sanz	6–3 / 6–0	(Argentina) Federico Mouriño (Spain) Marc Quilez	
18/9/2024	(Argentina) Valentino Libaak (Spain) Victor Ruiz	6–3 / 6–4	(Argentina) Fernando Belasteguín (Argentina) Juan Ignacio Tello	
17/9/2024	(Spain) Eduardo Alonso (Spain) Momo Gonzalez	6–1 / 6–1	(Spain) Inigo Jofre (Spain) Luis Hernandez Quesada	
18/9/2024	(Spain) Francisco Guerrero (Spain) Jairo Bautista	4–6 / 6–3 / 6–2	(Argentina) Juan Cruz Belluati (Argentina) Ramiro Moyano	
17/9/2024	(Spain) Juan Lebrón (Argentina) Martin Di Nenno	7–6 / 6–2	(Sweden) Daniel Windahl (Chile) Javier Valdes	
18/9/2024	(Argentina) Franco Stupaczuk (Spain) Miguel Yanguas	6–4 / 6–4	(Italy) Flavio Abbate (Italy) Giulio Graziotti	
18/9/2024	(Spain) Juanlu Esbri (Brazil) Lucas Bergamini	6–4 / 6–2	(Spain) Javier García Mora (Spain) Jaime Muñoz	
17/9/2024	(Spain) Javier Leal (Brazil) Lucas Campagnolo	7–6 / 6–4	(Argentina) Agustin Gutiérrez (Spain) José Rico	
17/9/2024	(Spain) Pablo Cardona (Spain) Paquito Navarro	4–6 / 6–3 / 6–4	(Spain) Pablo Castillo Valverde (Spain) Pablo García Rodrigo	
18/9/2024	(Spain) Alex Ruiz (Spain) Javi Garrido	6–4 / 3–6 / 6–3	(Spain) Alvero Cepero (Spain) Miguel Benítez	
18/9/2024	(Argentina) Alex Chozas (Argentina) Leandro Augsburger	6–6 / W.O.	(Spain) Alejandro Arroyo (Argentina) Sanyo Gutiérrez	
17/9/2024	(Spain) Javi Rico (Spain) Rafael Méndez	6–7 / 7–6 / 6–3	(Spain) Boris Castro García (Spain) Rodrigo Coello Manso	
18/9/2024	(Spain) Alejandro Galán (Argentina) Federico Chingotto	6–3 / 6–4	(Spain) Javier Gonzalez Barahona (Spain) Teodoro Zapata	

Women's

Date	Winners	Score	Opponent	Refs.
17/9/2024	(France) Alix Collombon (Spain) Araceli Martinez	7–6 / 6–7 / 6–2	(Spain) Alba Gallardo Salvado (Italy) Carlotta Casali	
17/9/2024	(Russia) Ksenia Sharifova (Spain) Lucía Martínez Gomez	7–6 / 6–7 / 6–2	(Spain) Marina Martinez Lobo (Spain) Sofía Saiz Vallejo	
18/9/2024	(Portugal) Ana Catarina Nogueira (Argentina) Claudia Jensen	6–1 / 7–6	(Spain) Laia Rodriguez Abajo (Spain) Sandra Bellver	
18/9/2024	(Spain) Marina Guinart (Spain) Victoria Iglesias	6–2 / 7–5	(Spain) Marta Barrera (Spain) Marta Caparrós	
17/9/2024	(Spain) Beatriz Caldera (Spain) Lorena Rufo	6–2 / 6–2	(Spain) Lucía García Trella (Spain) Natividad Lopez Díaz	
17/9/2024	(Spain) Carmen Goenaga (Argentina) Virginia Riera	6–4 / 6–0	(Spain) Agueda Perez (Spain) Patricia Martínez	
18/9/2024	(Spain) Julia Polo Bautista (Spain) Lara Arruabarrena	6–4 / 6–4	(Spain) Ariadna Cañellas (Sweden) Carolina Navarro	
17/9/2024	(Spain) Esther Carnicero (Spain) Melania Merino Saez	6–7 / 6–4 / 6–2	(Spain) Jimena Velasco (Spain) Noa Canovas	
18/9/2024	(Italy) Carolina Orsi (Spain) Nuria Rodriguez	6–7 / 7–5 / 7–5	(Argentina) Aranzazu Osoro (Spain) Veronica Virseda	
18/9/2024	(Spain) Lucia Sainz (Spain) Patricia Llaguno	6–7 / 6–4 / 6–0	(Spain) Barbara Las Heras (Spain) Marta Marrero	
18/9/2024	(Argentina) Julieta Bidahorria (Spain) Marta Talavan	7–6 / 6–3	(Spain) Noemi Aguilar (Spain) Teresa Navarro	
17/9/2024	(Spain) Marta Borrero (Spain) Martina Calvo	6–4 / 6–1	(Spain) Carla Mesa (Spain) Sara Ruiz Soto	

=== Round of 16 ===
Men's

Date	Winners	Score	Opponent	Refs.
19/9/2024	(Argentina) Agustín Tapia (Spain) Arturo Coello	6–4 / 6–4	(Spain) Gonzalo Rubio (Spain) Pablo Lijó	
19/9/2024	(Spain) Coki Nieto (Spain) Jon Sanz	6–3 / 6–3	(Spain) Ignacio Sager (Spain) Salvador Oria	
19/9/2024	(Spain) Eduardo Alonso (Spain) Momo Gonzalez	6–3 / 7–5	(Argentina) Valentino Libaak (Spain) Victor Ruiz	
19/9/2024	(Spain) Juan Lebrón (Argentina) Martin Di Nenno	6–3 / 3–6 / 6–3	(Spain) Francisco Guerrero (Spain) Jairo Bautista	
19/9/2024	(Spain) Juanlu Esbri (Brazil) Lucas Bergamini	6–4 / 2–6 / 7–6	(Argentina) Franco Stupaczuk (Spain) Miguel Yanguas	
19/9/2024	(Spain) Pablo Cardona (Spain) Paquito Navarro	6–4 / 7–6	(Spain) Javier Leal (Brazil) Lucas Campagnolo	
19/9/2024	(Argentina) Alex Chozas (Argentina) Leandro Augsburger	6–1 / 3–6 / 7–6	(Spain) Alex Ruiz (Spain) Javi Garrido	
19/9/2024	(Spain) Alejandro Galán (Argentina) Federico Chingotto	7–6 / 6–3	(Spain) Javi Rico (Spain) Rafael Méndez	

Women's

Date	Winners	Score	Opponent	Refs.
19/9/2024	(Spain) Ariana Sánchez (Spain) Paula Josemaria	6–0 / 6–1	(France) Alix Collombon (Spain) Araceli Martinez	
19/9/2024	(Portugal) Ana Catarina Nogueira (Argentina) Claudia Jensen	6–2 / 6–4	(Russia) Ksenia Sharifova (Spain) Lucía Martínez Gomez	
19/9/2024	(Spain) Beatriz Caldera (Spain) Lorena Rufo	6–4 / 3–6 / 7–5	(Spain) Marina Guinart (Spain) Victoria Iglesias	
19/9/2024	(Spain) Marta Ortega (Portugal) Sofia Araújo	6–0 / 7–6	(Spain) Carmen Goenaga (Argentina) Virginia Riera	
19/9/2024	(Spain) Andrea Ustero (Argentina) Delfina Brea	4–6 / 6–0 / 6–3	(Spain) Julia Polo Bautista (Spain) Lara Arruabarrena	
19/9/2024	(Spain) Esther Carnicero (Spain) Melania Merino Saez	6–3 / 2–6 / 6–2	(Italy) Carolina Orsi (Spain) Nuria Rodriguez	
19/9/2024	(Spain) Lucia Sainz (Spain) Patricia Llaguno	6–3 / 6–4	(Argentina) Julieta Bidahorria (Spain) Marta Talavan	
19/9/2024	(Spain) Claudia Fernandez (Spain) Gemma Triay	6–0 / 6–2	(Spain) Marta Borrero (Spain) Martina Calvo	

=== Quarter-Finals ===
Men's

Date	Winners	Score	Opponent	Refs.
20/9/2024	(Argentina) Agustín Tapia (Spain) Arturo Coello	6–3 / 6–4	(Spain) Coki Nieto (Spain) Jon Sanz	
20/9/2024	(Spain) Juan Lebrón (Argentina) Martin Di Nenno	6–3 / 6–4	(Spain) Eduardo Alonso (Spain) Momo Gonzalez	
20/9/2024	(Spain) Pablo Cardona (Spain) Paquito Navarro	6–3 / 7–6	(Spain) Juanlu Esbri (Brazil) Lucas Bergamini	
20/9/2024	(Spain) Alejandro Galán (Argentina) Federico Chingotto	6–3 / 6–4	(Argentina) Alex Chozas (Argentina) Leandro Augsburger	

Women's

Date	Winners	Score	Opponent	Refs.
20/9/2024	(Spain) Ariana Sánchez (Spain) Paula Josemaria	5–2 / W.O.	(Portugal) Ana Catarina Nogueira (Argentina) Claudia Jensen	
20/9/2024	(Spain) Marta Ortega (Portugal) Sofia Araújo	6–3 / 6–1	(Spain) Beatriz Caldera (Spain) Lorena Rufo	
20/9/2024	(Spain) Andrea Ustero (Argentina) Delfina Brea	6–2 / 6–2	(Spain) Esther Carnicero (Spain) Melania Merino Saez	
20/9/2024	(Spain) Claudia Fernandez (Spain) Gemma Triay	6–4 / 6–2	(Spain) Lucia Sainz (Spain) Patricia Llaguno	

=== Semi-Finals ===
Men's

Date	Winners	Score	Opponent	Refs.
21/9/2024	(Argentina) Agustín Tapia (Spain) Arturo Coello	6–2 / 6–2	(Spain) Juan Lebrón (Argentina) Martin Di Nenno	
21/9/2024	(Spain) Alejandro Galán (Argentina) Federico Chingotto	6–4 / 7–6	(Spain) Pablo Cardona (Spain) Paquito Navarro	

Women's

Date	Winners	Score	Opponent	Refs.
21/9/2024	(Spain) Ariana Sánchez (Spain) Paula Josemaria	6–2 / 6–3	(Spain) Marta Ortega (Portugal) Sofia Araújo	
21/9/2024	(Spain) Claudia Fernandez (Spain) Gemma Triay	6–4 / 6–3	(Spain) Andrea Ustero (Argentina) Delfina Brea	

=== Finals ===
Men's

Date	Winners	Score	Opponent	Refs.
22/9/2024	(Argentina) Agustín Tapia (Spain) Arturo Coello	6–4 / 4–6 / 6–3	(Spain) Alejandro Galán (Argentina) Federico Chingotto	

Women's

Date	Winners	Score	Opponent	Refs.
22/9/2024	(Spain) Claudia Fernandez (Spain) Gemma Triay	6–3 / 6–2	(Spain) Ariana Sánchez (Spain) Paula Josemaria	
