= Aurelio Carretero =

Spanish sculptor

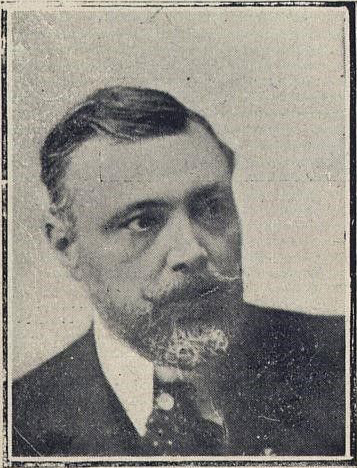
Aurelio Carretero, 1908

Aurelio Rodríguez Vicente Carretero (1863–1917), best known simply as Aurelio Carretero, was a Spanish sculptor.

== Biography ==
Born in 1863 in Medina de Rioseco (province of Valladolid), he studied at the Real Academia de Bellas Artes de la Purísima Concepción in Valladolid and the Real Academia de Bellas Artes de San Fernando in Madrid. He spent a time in South America, where he became a renowned caricaturist.

Some of his work include sculptures in public spaces such as Zorrilla (1899, Valladolid), Conde Ansúrez (1900, Valladolid), Andrés Torrejón (1908, Móstoles) and Campoamor (1912, Navia).
