= 2024 Málaga P1 =

Padel championships

- Date: 6 – 14 July
- Edition: 1st
- Category: P1
- Prize money: €470.000
- Location: Málaga, Spain
- Venue: Palacio de Deportes José María Martín Carpena

Champions
- Men's doubles: (Argentina) Agustín Tapia (Spain) Arturo Coello
- Women's doubles: (Spain) Ariana Sánchez (Spain) Paula Josemaría

Chronology

The 2024 Málaga P1 (officially 2024 Málaga Premier Padel P1) was the thirteenth tournament of the third season organized by Premier Padel, promoted by the International Padel Federation, and with the financial backing of Nasser Al-Khelaïfi's Qatar Sports Investments, now serving as the premier padel circuit.

In the women's category, FIP number 1 and 3 ranked pairs met in the finals, where Ariana Sánchez and Paula Josemaría faced and defeated the duo of Claudia Fernández and Gemma Triay, to win their fifth title of 2024.

In the men's division, the top two ranked teams met in the finals for the eight time in 2024, with Agustín Tapia and Arturo Coello avenging their two previous finals losses against Alejandro Galán and Federico Chingotto, to claim their sixth title of the season.

== Relevant data ==
=== Pair changes ===
After the tournament, Franco Stupaczuk and Martin Di Nenno ended their stint together, with Di Nenno becoming the new partner of Juan Lebrón, who had also ended his partnership with Paquito Navarro after just eight tournaments as a pair.

=== Titles and head-to-head record ===
With this victory, Coello and Tapia reached the summer break (the duo skipped the Nokia P2) with a 4–4 head-to-head record in finals against Chingotto and Galán, having won 6 out of 13 possible titles, while Galán had also won 6, five of them with Chingotto.

=== Record equaled ===
By defeating the world number 3s in the final, Ariana and Paula tied the twins Mapi and Majo as the pair with the most tournament wins in padel history, with 32 titles.

== Seeds ==
Male

Rnk.	Team	FIP Ranking Points
1	(Argentina) Agustín Tapia (Spain) Arturo Coello	26871
2	(Spain) Alejandro Galán (Argentina) Federico Chingotto	23206
3	(Argentina) Franco Stupaczuk (Argentina) Martin Di Nenno	17473
4	(Spain) Juan Lebrón (Spain) Paquito Navarro	17133
5	(Spain) Javi Garrido (Argentina) Miguel Yanguas	8631
6	(Argentina) Fernando Belasteguín (Argentina) Juan Tello	8533
7	(Argentina) Aléx Ruiz (Spain) Momo Gonzalez	7636
8	(Spain) Coki Nieto (Spain) Jon Sanz	6663
9	(Spain) Alejandro Arroyo (Argentina) Sanyo Gutiérrez	6287
10	(Argentina) Lucho Capra (Argentina) Maxi Sanchéz	4833
11	(Brazil) Lucas Bergamini (Spain) Victor Ruiz	4760
12	(Spain) Javier Leal (Brazil) Lucas Campagnolo	3663
13	(Spain) Javi Ruiz (Spain) Pablo Cardona	3084
14	(Spain) Alex Chozas (Spain) Eduardo Alonso	3035
15	(Spain) Javier Barahona (Spain) Teodoro Zapata	2411
16	(Spain) Francisco Guerrero (Spain) Jairo Bautista	3052

Female

Rnk.	Team	FIP Ranking Points
1	(Spain) Ariana Sanchez (Spain) Paula Josemaria	27480
2	(Spain) Beatriz Gonzalez (Argentina) Delfina Brea	17860
3	(Spain) Claudia Fernandez (Spain) Gemma Triay	15995
4	(Spain) Marta Ortega (Portugal) Sofia Araújo	11118
5	(Argentina) Claudia Jensen (Spain) Jessica Castello	10088
6	(Spain) Lucia Sainz (Spain) Patty Llaguno	9239
7	(Spain) Alejandra Salazar (Spain) Veronica Virseda	9013
8	(Spain) Carmen Goenaga (Argentina) Virginia Riera	5530
9	(Spain) Alejandra Alonso (Spain) Andrea Ustero	4488
10	(Spain) Beatriz Caldera (Spain) Lorena Rufo	3502
11	(Argentina) Aranzazu Osoro (Spain) Marta Marrero	3385
12	(Italy) Carolina Orsi (Spain) Nuria Rodriguez Camacho	3106
13	(Russia) Ksenia Sharifova (Spain) Lucia Martinez	3103
14	(Portugal) Ana Catarina Nogueira (Spain) Marta Talavan	2824
15	(Spain) Carla Mesa (Spain) Sara Ruiz	2695
16	(Spain) Esther Carnicero (Spain) Melania Merino	2256

== Head-to-head record between teams ranked in the top 4 during the season ==
=== Man's ===
Record	Coello–Tapia	Galán–Chingotto	Lebrón–Paquito	Di Nenno–Stupaczuk	Former Pairs	Galán–Lebrón	Paquito–Sanyo
Coello–Tapia	—	4–5	4–0	1–0		1–1	2–0
Galán–Chingotto	5–4	—	1–0	7–0		—	—
Lebrón–Paquito	0–4	0–1	—	0–1		—	—
Di Nenno–Stupaczuk	0–1	0–7	1–0	—		0–2	—
Former Pairs							
Galán–Lebrón	1–1	—	—	2–0		—	—
Paquito–Sanyo	0–2	—	—	—		—	—

=== Women's ===
Record	Ariana–Paula	Gonzalez–D. Brea	Fernandez–Triay	Araújo–Ortega	Former Pairs	Icardo–Salazar	Ortega–Triay	Ortega–Virseda
Ariana–Paula	—	2–1	4–3	0–1		1–0	—	1z–0
B. Gonzalez–D. Brea	1–2	—	3–1	—		3–0	—	—
Fernandez–Triay	3–4	1–3	—	—		0–1	—	1–0
Araújo–Ortega	1–0	—	—	—		—	—	—
Former Pairs								
Icardo–Salazar	0–1	0–3	1–0	—		—	—	—
Ortega–Triay	—	—	—	—		—	—	—
Ortega–Virseda	0–1	—	0–1	—		—	—	—

== Draws ==
=== Men's Bracket ===
Round of 32
1	(Spain) Coello / (Argentina) Tapia	6	6
33	(Spain) A. Luque / (Italy) F. Dominguez	3	0
35	(Argentina) F. Mouriño / (Spain) I. Vilariño	4	2
11	(Brazil) L. Bergamini / (Spain) V. Ruiz	6	6
12	(Spain) J. Leal / (Brazil) L. Campagnolo	6	6
29	(Spain) E. Chamero / (Chile) J. Valdes	2	3
32	(Spain) I. Jofre / (Spain) L.H. Quesada	6	1
6	(Argentina) Belasteguin / (Argentina) J. Tello	7	6
8	(Spain) Coki / (Spain) J. Sanz	5	6	6
18	(Argentina) J.C. Belluati / (Argentina) M. Lamperti	7	3	3
26	(Spain) F. Gil / (Argentina) G. Alfonso	6	1	7
10	(Argentina) A. Chozas / (Argentina) L. Capra	4	6	5
16	(Spain) F. Guerrero / (Spain) J. Bautista	4	6
25	(Argentina) L. Augsburger / (Argentina) V. Libaak	6	7
17	(Spain) I. Sager / (Spain) S. Oria	3	4
4	(Spain) Lebrón / (Spain) Paquito	6	6
3	(Argentina) F. Stupaczuk / (Argentina) Di Nenno	6	6
20	(Spain) A. Ayats / (Spain) E. Goenaga	3	4
23	(Spain) J.J. Casas / (Spain) P. Fernandez	2	2
14	(Argentina) A. Chozas / (Spain) E. Alonso	6	6
9	(Spain) A. Arroyo / (Argentina) Sanyo	4	6	6
19	(Spain) J.G. Diestro / (Spain) P. Lijó	6	3	4
WC	(Spain) G. Losada / (Spain) J. Martinez	3	4
7	(Spain) A. Ruiz / (Spain) Momo	6	6
5	(Spain) J. Garrido / (Spain) Yanguas	6	6
36	(Spain) M. Quilez / (Spain) M. Semmler	4	2
22	(Spain) A. Cepero / (Spain) M. Benitez	3	4
13	(Spain) J. Ruiz / (Spain) P. Cardona	6	6
15	(Spain) J. Barahona / (Spain) T. Zapata	6	6
Q	(Spain) R. Mendez / (Spain) T. Bueno	4	4
Q	(Spain) J. Rico / (Spain) J. Esbri	0	4
2	(Spain) Galán / (Argentina) F. Chingotto	6	6

Round of 16
1	(Spain) Coello / (Argentina) Tapia	6	6
11	(Brazil) L. Bergamini / (Spain) V. Ruiz	1	2
12	(Spain) J. Leal / (Brazil) L. Campagnolo	7	6	5
6	(Argentina) Belasteguin / (Argentina) J. Tello	6	6	7
8	(Spain) Coki / (Spain) J. Sanz	6	7
26	(Spain) F. Gil / (Argentina) G. Alfonso	2	6
25	(Argentina) L. Augsburger / (Argentina) V. Libaak	5	2
4	(Spain) Lebrón / (Spain) Paquito	7	6
3	(Argentina) F. Stupaczuk / (Argentina) Di Nenno	6	6
14	(Argentina) A. Chozas / (Spain) E. Alonso	3	3
9	(Spain) A. Arroyo / (Argentina) Sanyo	6	3
7	(Spain) A. Ruiz / (Spain) Momo	7	6
5	(Spain) J. Garrido / (Spain) Yanguas	3	7	6
13	(Spain) J. Ruiz / (Spain) P. Cardona	6	6	7
15	(Spain) J. Barahona / (Spain) T. Zapata	1	1
2	(Spain) Galán / (Argentina) F. Chingotto	6	6

Quarter-Final
1	(Spain) Coello / (Argentina) Tapia	6	6
6	(Argentina) Belasteguin / (Argentina) J. Tello	3	1
8	(Spain) Coki / (Spain) J. Sanz	3	6	4
4	(Spain) Lebrón / (Spain) Paquito	6	3	6
3	(Argentina) F. Stupaczuk / (Argentina) Di Nenno	6	6
7	(Spain) A. Ruiz / (Spain) Momo	1	2
13	(Spain) J. Ruiz / (Spain) P. Cardona	3	2
2	(Spain) Galán / (Argentina) F. Chingotto	6	6

Semi-Finals
1	(Spain) Coello / (Argentina) Tapia	6	7
4	(Spain) Lebrón / (Spain) Paquito	4	5
3	(Argentina) F. Stupaczuk / (Argentina) Di Nenno	2	4
2	(Spain) Galán / (Argentina) F. Chingotto	6	6

Finals
1	(Spain) Coello / (Argentina) Tapia	6	6
2	(Spain) Galán / (Argentina) F. Chingotto	2	3

=== Women's Bracket ===
Round of 32
1	(Spain) A. Sanchez / (Spain) P. Josemaria	6	6
15	(Spain) C. Mesa / (Spain) S. Ruiz	3	3
23	(Spain) M. Borrero / (Spain) S. Bellver	4	2
13	(Russia) K. Sharifova / (Spain) L. Martinez	6	6
18	(Spain) J. Velasco / (Spain) N. Canovas	0	7	6
10	(Spain) B. Caldera / (Spain) L. Rufo	6	6	3
14	(Portugal) A. Nogueira / (Spain) M. Talavan	2	6	3
5	(Argentina) C. Jensen / (Spain) J. Castello	6	3	6
6	(Spain) L. Sainz / (Spain) P. Llaguno	6	6
9	(Spain) A. Alonso / (Spain) A. Ustero	1	1
Q	(Spain) J. Bautista / (Spain) L. Arruabarrena	6	6
Q	(Netherlands) M. Koek / (Spain) R. Lopez	1	2
24	(Spain) A. Cañellas / (Spain) T. Navarro	5	7	6
20	(Sweden) C. Navarro / (Spain) M.R. Abajo	7	6	3
21	(Spain) M. Barrera / (Spain) M. Caparros	2	0
4	(Spain) M. Ortega / (Portugal) S. Araújo	6	6
3	(Spain) C. Fernandez / (Spain) G. Triay	6	6
19	(Spain) M. Lobo / (Spain) S. Saiz	0	0
26	(Spain) A. Soriano / (Italy) C. Casali	7	4	6
WC	(Spain) A. Momha / (Spain) A. Ramos	5	6	7
Q	(Spain) M. Goyeneche / (Spain) R. Barrera	3	3
16	(Spain) E. Carnicero / (Spain) M. Merino	6	6
25	(Spain) M. Guinart / (Spain) M. Santamaria	2	6	3
8	(Spain) C. Goenaga / (Argentina) V. Riera	6	4	6
7	(Spain) A. Salazar / (Spain) V. Virseda	4	7	7
12	(Italy) C. Orsi / (Spain) N. Rodriguez	6	5	6
11	(Argentina) A. Osoro / (Spain) M. Marrero	6	7
22	(Spain) A. Perez / (Spain) P. Martinez	1	6
27	(Italy) G. Marchetti / (France) L. Godallier	6	6
Q	(Spain) L. Exposito / (Portugal) P. Ribeiro	2	3
17	(Spain) B. Las Heras / (Spain) V. Iglesias	0	1
2	(Spain) B. Gonzalez / (Argentina) D. Brea	6	6

Round of 16
1	(Spain) A. Sanchez / (Spain) P. Josemaria	6	3	6
13	(Russia) K. Sharifova / (Spain) L. Martinez	1	6	0
18	(Spain) J. Velasco / (Spain) N. Canovas	5	4
5	(Argentina) C. Jensen / (Spain) J. Castello	7	6
6	(Spain) L. Sainz / (Spain) P. Llaguno	6	6	6
Q	(Spain) J. Bautista / (Spain) L. Arruabarrena	7	2	4
24	(Spain) A. Cañellas / (Spain) T. Navarro	0	1
4	(Spain) M. Ortega / (Portugal) S. Araújo	6	6
3	(Spain) C. Fernandez / (Spain) G. Triay	6	6
WC	(Spain) A. Momha / (Spain) A. Ramos	0	0
16	(Spain) E. Carnicero / (Spain) M. Merino	2	2
8	(Spain) C. Goenaga / (Argentina) V. Riera	6	6
7	(Spain) A. Salazar / (Spain) V. Virseda	3	1
11	(Argentina) A. Osoro / (Spain) M. Marrero	6	6
27	(Italy) G. Marchetti / (France) L. Godallier	0	7	4
2	(Spain) B. Gonzalez / (Argentina) D. Brea	6	6	6

Quarter-Final
1	(Spain) A. Sanchez / (Spain) P. Josemaria	6	6
5	(Argentina) C. Jensen / (Spain) J. Castello	2	3
6	(Spain) L. Sainz / (Spain) P. Llaguno	6	6
4	(Spain) M. Ortega / (Portugal) S. Araújo	4	2
3	(Spain) C. Fernandez / (Spain) G. Triay	6	6
8	(Spain) C. Goenaga / (Argentina) V. Riera	1	3
11	(Argentina) A. Osoro / (Spain) M. Marrero	2	6	4
2	(Spain) B. Gonzalez / (Argentina) D. Brea	6	2	6

Semi-Finals
1	(Spain) A. Sanchez / (Spain) P. Josemaria	6	3	6
6	(Spain) L. Sainz / (Spain) P. Llaguno	2	6	4
3	(Spain) C. Fernandez / (Spain) G. Triay	*
2	(Spain) B. Gonzalez / (Argentina) D. Brea

Finals
1	(Spain) A. Sanchez / (Spain) P. Josemaria	1	6	6
3	(Spain) C. Fernandez / (Spain) G. Triay	6	4	2

== Results ==
=== Round of 64 ===
Men's

Date	Winners	Score	Opponent	Refs.
8/7/2024	(Spain) Antonio Luque (Italy) Facundo Dominguez	6–4 / 6–1	(Spain) Mario Ortega (Spain) Miguel Gonzalez	
8/7/2024	(Argentina) Federico Mouriño (Spain) Ignacio Vilariño	6–1 / 6–4	(Italy) Aris Patiniotis (Spain) Jose Sanchez Serrano	
8/7/2024	(Spain) Emilio Sanchez Chamero (Chile) Javier Valdes	6–4 / 7–6	(Sweden) Daniel Windahl (Spain) Jose Solano Marmolejo	
8/7/2024	(Spain) Inigo Jofre (Spain) Luis Hernandez Quesada	7–6 / 6–4	(Spain) Antón Sans (Spain) David Gala Sanchez	
8/7/2024	(Argentina) Juan Cruz Belluati (Argentina) Miguel Lamperti	6–1 / 5–3 / W.O.	(Spain) Diego Gil Batista (Spain) Raúl Marcos Duran	
8/7/2024	(Spain) Francisco Gil Morales (Argentina) Gonzalo Alfonso	6–1 / 6–3	(Spain) Carlos Marti (Spain) Jose Luis Gonzalez	
8/7/2024	(Argentina) Leandro Augsburger (Argentina) Valentino Libaak	6–2 / 4–6 / 6–4	(Argentina) Cristian German Gutierrez (Spain) Jorge Ruiz Gutierrez	
8/7/2024	(Spain) Ignacio Sager (Spain) Salvador Oria	6–4 / 6–2	(Spain) Cayetano Rocafort (Spain) Manuel Rocafort	
8/7/2024	(Spain) Arnau Ayats (Spain) Enrique Goenaga	0–6 / 6–3 / 6–4	(Spain) Javier García Mora (Spain) Jaime Muñoz	
8/7/2024	(Spain) José Jimenez Casas (Spain) Pincho Fernandez	6–3 / 6–1	(Spain) Gonzalo Rubio (Argentina) Leonel Aguirre	
8/7/2024	(Spain) Jose García Diestro (Spain) Pablo Lijó	6–3 / 6–3	(Argentina) Agustin Gutiérrez (Spain) José Rico	
8/7/2024	(Spain) Guillermo Collado (Spain) Javi Martinez Vazquez	6–1 / 6–1	(Spain) Francisco Alameda (Spain) Luis Pozo Carballo	
8/7/2024	(Spain) Marc Quilez (Spain) Miguel Semmler	6–2 / 5–7 / 6–4	(Portugal) Miguel Deus (Portugal) Nuno Deus	
8/7/2024	(Spain) Alvero Cepero (Spain) Miguel Benítez	2–6 / 6–2 / 7–6	(Spain) Alvaro Melendez Amaya (Spain) Pedro Melendez Amaya	
8/7/2024	(Spain) Rafael Mendez (Spain) Toni Bueno	6–0 / 6–2	(Spain) Fran Ramirez (Spain) Victor Mena Gil	
8/7/2024	(Spain) Javier Rico (Spain) Juanlu Esbri	6–3 / 6–2	(Italy) Denis Perino (Spain) Pablo García Rodrigo	

=== Round of 32 ===
Men's

Date	Winners	Score	Opponent	Refs.
10/7/2024	(Argentina) Agustín Tapia (Spain) Arturo Coello	6–3 / 6–0	(Spain) Antonio Luque (Italy) Facundo Dominguez	
10/7/2024	(Brazil) Lucas Bergamini (Spain) Víctor Ruiz	6–4 / 6–2	(Argentina) Federico Mouriño (Spain) Ignacio Vilariño	
9/7/2024	(Spain) Javier Leal (Brazil) Lucas Campagnolo	6–2 / 6–3	(Spain) Emilio Sanchez Chamero (Chile) Javier Valdes	
10/7/2024	(Argentina) Fernando Belasteguín (Argentina) Juan Tello	7–6 / 6–1	(Spain) Inigo Jofre (Spain) Luis Hernandez Quesada	
9/7/2024	(Spain) Coki Nieto (Spain) Jon Sanz	5–7 / 6–3 / 6–3	(Argentina) Juan Cruz Belluati (Argentina) Miguel Lamperti	
9/7/2024	(Spain) Francisco Gil Morales (Argentina) Gonzalo Alfonso	6–4 / 1–6 / 7–5	(Argentina) Lucho Capra (Argentina) Maxi Sánchez	
10/7/2024	(Argentina) Leandro Augsburger (Argentina) Valentino Libaak	6–4 / 7–6	(Spain) Francisco Guerrero (Spain) Jairo Bautista	
10/7/2024	(Spain) Juan Lebrón (Spain) Paquito Navarro	6–3 / 6–4	(Spain) Ignacio Sager (Spain) Salvador Oria	
10/7/2024	(Argentina) Franco Stupaczuk (Argentina) Martin Di Nenno	6–3 / 6–4	(Spain) Arnau Ayats (Spain) Enrique Goenaga	
9/7/2024	(Argentina) Alex Chozas (Spain) Eduardo Alonso	6–2 / 6–2	(Spain) José Jimenez Casas (Spain) Pincho Fernandez	
9/7/2024	(Spain) Alejandro Arroyo (Argentina) Sanyo Gutiérrez	4–6 / 6–3 / 6–4	(Spain) Jose García Diestro (Spain) Pablo Lijó	
9/7/2024	(Spain) Alex Ruiz (Spain) Momo Gonzalez	6–3 / 6–4	(Spain) Guillermo Collado (Spain) Javi Martinez Vazquez	
10/7/2024	(Spain) Javi Garrido (Spain) Mike Yanguas	6–4 / 6–2	(Spain) Marc Quilez (Spain) Miguel Semmler	
9/7/2024	(Spain) Javi Ruiz (Spain) Pablo Cardona	6–3 / 6–4	(Spain) Alvero Cepero (Spain) Miguel Benítez	
9/7/2024	(Spain) Javier Gonzalez Barahona (Spain) Teodoro Zapata	6–4 / 6–4	(Spain) Rafael Mendez (Spain) Toni Bueno	
10/7/2024	(Spain) Alejandro Galán (Argentina) Federico Chingotto	6–0 / 6–4	(Spain) Javier Rico (Spain) Juanlu Esbri	

Women's

Date	Winners	Score	Opponent	Refs.
10/7/2024	(Spain) Ariana Sánchez (Spain) Paula Josemaria	6–3 / 6–3	(Spain) Carla Mesa (Spain) Sara Ruiz	
10/7/2024	(Russia) Ksenia Sharifova (Spain) Lucía Martínez Gomez	6–4 / 6–2	(Spain) Marta Borrero (Spain) Sandra Bellver	
9/7/2024	(Spain) Jimena Velasco (Spain) Noa Canovas	0–6 / 7–6 / 6–3	(Spain) Beatriz Caldera (Spain) Lorena Rufo	
9/7/2024	(Argentina) Claudia Jensen (Spain) Jessica Castelló	6–2 / 3–6 / 6–3	(Portugal) Ana Catarina Nogueira (Spain) Marta Talavan	
10/7/2024	(Spain) Lucia Sainz (Spain) Patricia Llaguno	6–1 / 6–1	(Spain) Alejandra Alonso (Spain) Andrea Ustero	
9/7/2024	(Spain) Julia Polo Bautista (Spain) Lara Arruabarrena	6–1 / 6–2	(Netherlands) Marcella Koek (Netherlands) Rebeca Lopez	
10/7/2024	(Spain) Ariadna Cañellas (Spain) Teresa Navarro	5–7 / 7–6 / 6–3	(Sweden) Carolina Navarro Björk (Spain) Laia Rodriguez Abajo	
10/7/2024	(Spain) Marta Ortega (Portugal) Sofia Araújo	6–2 / 6–0	(Spain) Marta Barrera (Spain) Marta Caparrós	
10/7/2024	(Spain) Claudia Fernandez (Spain) Gemma Triay	6–0 / 6–0	(Spain) Melania Merino (Spain) Sofía Saiz	
9/7/2024	(Spain) Alba Perez Momha (Italy) Lorena Vano	5–7 / 6–4 / 7–6	(Spain) Arantxa Soriano Perez (Italy) Carlotta Casali	
9/7/2024	(Spain) Esther Carnicero (Spain) Melania Merino Saez	6–3 / 6–3	(Spain) Camila Fassio (Spain) Raquel Eugenio	
10/7/2024	(Spain) Carmen Goenaga (Argentina) Virginia Riera	6–2 / 4–6 / 6–3	(Spain) Marina Guinart (Spain) Martina Calvo	
10/7/2024	(Spain) Alejandra Salazar (Spain) Verónica Virseda	4–6 / 7–5 / 7–6	(Italy) Carolina Orsi (Spain) Nuria Rodriguez	
9/7/2024	(Argentina) Aranzazu Osoro (Spain) Marta Marrero	6–1 / 7–6	(Spain) Agueda Perez (Spain) Patricia Martínez	
9/7/2024	(Italy) Giorgia Marchetti (France) Lea Godallier	6–2 / 6–3	(Spain) Lucía Peralta (Portugal) Patricia Ribeiro	
9/7/2024	(Spain) Bea González (Argentina) Delfina Brea	6–0 / 6–1	(Spain) Barbara Las Heras (Spain) Victoria Iglesias	

=== Round of 16 ===
Men's

Date	Winners	Score	Opponent	Refs.
11/7/2024	(Argentina) Agustín Tapia (Spain) Arturo Coello	6–1 / 6–2	(Brazil) Lucas Bergamini (Spain) Víctor Ruiz	
11/7/2024	(Argentina) Fernando Belasteguín (Argentina) Juan Tello	6–7 / 6–4 / 7–5	(Spain) Javier Leal (Brazil) Lucas Campagnolo	
11/7/2024	(Spain) Coki Nieto (Spain) Jon Sanz	6–2 / 7–6	(Spain) Francisco Gil Morales (Argentina) Gonzalo Alfonso	
11/7/2024	(Spain) Juan Lebrón (Spain) Paquito Navarro	7–5 / 6–2	(Argentina) Leandro Augsburger (Argentina) Valentino Libaak	
11/7/2024	(Argentina) Franco Stupaczuk (Argentina) Martin Di Nenno	6–3 / 6–3	(Argentina) Alex Chozas (Spain) Eduardo Alonso	
11/7/2024	(Spain) Alex Ruiz (Spain) Momo Gonzalez	7–6 / 6–3	(Spain) Alejandro Arroyo (Argentina) Sanyo Gutiérrez	
11/7/2024	(Spain) Javi Ruiz (Spain) Pablo Cardona	6–3 / 6–7 / 7–6	(Spain) Javi Garrido (Spain) Mike Yanguas	
11/7/2024	(Spain) Alejandro Galán (Argentina) Federico Chingotto	6–1 / 6–1	(Spain) Javier Gonzalez Barahona (Spain) Teodoro Zapata	

Women's

Date	Winners	Score	Opponent	Refs.
11/7/2024	(Spain) Ariana Sánchez (Spain) Paula Josemaria	6–1 / 3–6 / 6–0	(Russia) Ksenia Sharifova (Spain) Lucía Martínez Gomez	
11/7/2024	(Argentina) Claudia Jensen (Spain) Jessica Castelló	7–5 / 6–4	(Spain) Jimena Velasco (Spain) Noa Canovas	
11/7/2024	(Spain) Lucia Sainz (Spain) Patricia Llaguno	6–7 / 6–2 / 6–4	(Spain) Julia Polo Bautista (Spain) Lara Arruabarrena	
11/7/2024	(Spain) Marta Ortega (Portugal) Sofia Araújo	6–0 / 6–1	(Spain) Ariadna Cañellas (Spain) Teresa Navarro	
11/7/2024	(Spain) Claudia Fernandez (Spain) Gemma Triay	6–0 / 6–0	(Spain) Alba Perez Momha (Italy) Lorena Vano	
11/7/2024	(Spain) Carmen Goenaga (Argentina) Virginia Riera	6–2 / 6–2	(Spain) Esther Carnicero (Spain) Melania Merino Saez	
11/7/2024	(Argentina) Aranzazu Osoro (Spain) Marta Marrero	6–3 / 6–1	(Spain) Alejandra Salazar (Spain) Verónica Virseda	
11/7/2024	(Spain) Bea González (Argentina) Delfina Brea	6–0 / 6–7 / 6–4	(Italy) Giorgia Marchetti (France) Lea Godallier	

=== Quarter-Finals ===
Men's

Date	Winners	Score	Opponent	Refs.
12/7/2024	(Argentina) Agustín Tapia (Spain) Arturo Coello	6–3 / 6–1	(Argentina) Fernando Belasteguín (Argentina) Juan Tello	
12/7/2024	(Spain) Juan Lebrón (Spain) Paquito Navarro	6–3 / 3–6 / 6–4	(Spain) Coki Nieto (Spain) Jon Sanz	
12/7/2024	(Argentina) Franco Stupaczuk (Argentina) Martin Di Nenno	6–1 / 6–2	(Spain) Alex Ruiz (Spain) Momo Gonzalez	
12/7/2024	(Spain) Alejandro Galán (Argentina) Federico Chingotto	6–3 / 6–2	(Spain) Javi Ruiz (Spain) Pablo Cardona	

Women's

Date	Winners	Score	Opponent	Refs.
12/7/2024	(Spain) Ariana Sánchez (Spain) Paula Josemaria	6–2 / 6–3	(Argentina) Claudia Jensen (Spain) Jessica Castelló	
12/7/2024	(Spain) Lucia Sainz (Spain) Patricia Llaguno	6–4 / 6–2	(Spain) Marta Ortega (Portugal) Sofia Araújo	
12/7/2024	(Spain) Claudia Fernandez (Spain) Gemma Triay	6–1 / 6–3	(Spain) Carmen Goenaga (Argentina) Virginia Riera	
12/7/2024	(Spain) Bea González (Argentina) Delfina Brea	6–2 / 2–6 / 6–4	(Argentina) Aranzazu Osoro (Spain) Marta Marrero	

=== Semi-Finals ===
Men's

Date	Winners	Score	Opponent	Refs.
13/7/2024	(Argentina) Agustín Tapia (Spain) Arturo Coello	6–4 / 7–5	(Spain) Juan Lebrón (Spain) Paquito Navarro	
13/7/2024	(Spain) Alejandro Galán (Argentina) Federico Chingotto	6–2 / 6–4	(Argentina) Franco Stupaczuk (Argentina) Martin Di Nenno	

Women's

Date	Winners	Score	Opponent	Refs.
13/7/2024	(Spain) Ariana Sánchez (Spain) Paula Josemaria	6–2 / 3–6 / 6–4	(Spain) Lucia Sainz (Spain) Patricia Llaguno	
13/7/2024	(Spain) Claudia Fernandez (Spain) Gemma Triay	W.O.	(Spain) Bea González (Argentina) Delfina Brea	

=== Finals ===
Men's

Date	Winners	Score	Opponent	Refs.
14/7/2024	(Argentina) Agustín Tapia (Spain) Arturo Coello	6–2 / 6–3	(Spain) Alejandro Galán (Argentina) Federico Chingotto	

Women's

Date	Winners	Score	Opponent	Refs.
14/7/2024	(Spain) Ariana Sánchez (Spain) Paula Josemaria	1–6 / 6–4 / 6–2	(Spain) Claudia Fernandez (Spain) Gemma Triay	
