= 2019 WPT Mexico Open =

World Padel Tour tournament held in Mexico City, Mexico

- Date: 26 November – 1 December
- Edition: 2nd (Note: The first edition was held under the organization of the Padel Pro Tour)
- Category: Open
- Location: Mexico City, Mexico
- Venue: Lomas Sporting Club

Champions
- Men's doubles: (Argentina) Maxi Sánchez (Argentina) Sanyo Gutiérrez

Chronology

The 2019 Mexico Open (officially 2019 World Padel Tour Mexico Open) was the seventeenth tournament of the seventh season organized by World Padel Tour, the most prestigious padel circuit at the time, and the second tournament organized by the main padel circuit on Mexican soil (the first was the 2012 Acapulco Master). The tournament also marked the 50th anniversary of the creation of padel, the sport having been created in Mexico.

For the third time this season, the tournament did not feature a women's draw.

In the men's category, for the fifth time this season, the two best pairs in the ranking reached the final, something that hadn't happened since the fifth tournament of the season in Jaén (seven months ago). By reaching the final, Juan Lebrón and Paquito Navarro mathematically guaranteed finishing the year as world number 1s, with Paquito equaling Lebrón, who until then was the sole leader, at the top of the rankings. In the final, Maxi Sánchez and Sanyo Gutiérrez, now as the number two pair, defeated Lebrón and Paquito in three sets, winning their fifth title of the season, and equaling Lebrón and Paquito as the men's pair with the most titles on the circuit, with five. With the victory, Maxi and Sanyo also became the first pair to win a title on Mexican soil in the era of the World Padel Tour.

Despite there being no women's category in the tournament, during the tournament Marta Ortega also equaled her partner Marta Marrero at the top of the world ranking, becoming the youngest world number 1 of all time at 22 years old.

== Head-to-head record between teams ranked in the top 4 during the season ==
=== Men's ===
Record	Lebrón–Paquito	Maxi–Sanyo	Galán–Lima	Belasteguín–Tapia	Former Pairs	Díaz–Stupaczuk	Belasteguín–Lima	Galán–J. Mieres	Lamperti–Mieres
Lebrón–Paquito	—	1–4	0–2	2–2		2–3	5–0	2–0	—
Maxi–Sanyo	4–1	—	1–0	1–1		4–0	—	1–1	—
Galán–Lima	2–0	0–1	—	1–0		1–1	—	—	—
Belasteguín–Tapia	2–2	1–1	0–1	—		1–0	—	—	—
Former Pairs
Díaz–Stupaczuk	3–2	0–4	1–1	0–1		—	0–1	2–0	—
Belasteguín–Lima	0–5	—	—	—		1–0	—	0–1	—
Galán–J. Mieres	0–2	1–1	—	—		0–2	1–0	—	—
Lamperti–Mieres	—	—	—	—		—	—	—	—

Although Lebrón and Paquito were the number 1 pair in the rankings, the draw took place before the São Paulo Open, and at a time when Maxi and Sanyo were still the number 1-ranked pair.

== Draws ==
=== Men's Bracket ===
Round of 32
1	(Argentina) Maxi / (Argentina) Sanyo
Bye
(Spain) J. Rico / (Spain) V. Ruiz	5	2
(Argentina) J.C. Belluati / (Argentina) R. Moyano	7	6
(Spain) Coki / (Spain) J. Rico	6	6
WC	(Mexico) A. Cuevas / (Mexico) R. Hernández	1	1
WC	(Mexico) L. Ortega / (Mexico) P. Acevedo	2	0
5	(Argentina) F. Stupaczuk / (Spain) M. Díaz	6	6
8	(Argentina) A. Allemandi / (Argentina) A. Silingo	7	2	5
(Argentina) C. Gutiérrez / (Argentina) F. Quiles	5	6	7
Q	(Uruguay) D. Ramos / (Spain) R. Méndez	2	4
(Spain) G. Rubio / (Spain) E. Moreno	6	6
(Spain) N. Gadea / (Argentina) S. Nerone	3	4
Q	(Spain) J.G. Diestro / (Spain) P. Fernández	6	6
Bye
3	(Spain) Galán / (Brazil) Lima
4	(Argentina) Belasteguín / (Argentina) Tapia
Bye
(Spain) Á. Cepero / (Spain) P. Lijó	7	6	4
(Spain) A. Ruiz / (Spain) M. Piñeiro	5	7	6
(Spain) A. Santana / (Brazil) L. Bergamini	6	6
Q	(Spain) J. Barahona / (Spain) Momo	4	4
(Argentina) M. Grabiel / (Argentina) M. Lamperti	7	4	4
6	(Spain) J. Ruiz / (Spain) U. Botello	6	6	6
7	(Argentina) F. Chingotto / (Argentina) J. Tello	6	6
Q	(Spain) F. Gil Morales / (Spain) S. Alba	3	4
(Spain) A. Blanco / (Spain) J. Martinez	3	1
(Brazil) L. Campagnolo / (Argentina) L. Capra	6	6
(Argentina) Di Nenno / (Spain) J. Garrido	6	5	*
(Spain) J. Mieres / (Brazil) M. Jardim	3	2
Bye
2	(Spain) Lebrón / (Spain) Paquito

Round of 16
1	(Argentina) Maxi / (Argentina) Sanyo	6	6
(Argentina) J.C. Belluati / (Argentina) R. Moyano	3	2
(Spain) Coki / (Spain) J. Rico	6	4
5	(Argentina) F. Stupaczuk / (Spain) M. Díaz	7	6
(Argentina) C. Gutiérrez / (Argentina) F. Quiles	3	1
(Spain) G. Rubio / (Spain) E. Moreno	6	6
Q	(Spain) J.G. Diestro / (Spain) P. Fernández	3	2
3	(Spain) Galán / (Brazil) Lima	6	6
4	(Argentina) Belasteguín / (Argentina) Tapia	3	4
(Spain) A. Ruiz / (Spain) M. Piñeiro	6	6
(Spain) A. Santana / (Brazil) L. Bergamini	4	6
6	(Spain) J. Ruiz / (Spain) U. Botello	6	7
7	(Argentina) F. Chingotto / (Argentina) J. Tello	6	4	3
(Brazil) L. Campagnolo / (Argentina) L. Capra	3	6	6
(Argentina) Di Nenno / (Spain) J. Garrido	2	3
2	(Spain) Lebrón / (Spain) Paquito	6	6

Quarter-Final
1	(Argentina) Maxi / (Argentina) Sanyo	7	6
5	(Argentina) F. Stupaczuk / (Spain) M. Díaz	6	4
(Spain) G. Rubio / (Spain) E. Moreno	2	4
3	(Spain) Galán / (Brazil) Lima	6	6
(Spain) A. Ruiz / (Spain) M. Piñeiro	6	7
6	(Spain) J. Ruiz / (Spain) U. Botello	2	5
(Brazil) L. Campagnolo / (Argentina) L. Capra	3	4
2	(Spain) Lebrón / (Spain) Paquito	6	6

Semi-Finals
1	(Argentina) Maxi / (Argentina) Sanyo	4	6	6
3	(Spain) Galán / (Brazil) Lima	6	4	3
(Spain) A. Ruiz / (Spain) M. Piñeiro	3	1
2	(Spain) Lebrón / (Spain) Paquito	6	6

Finals
1	(Argentina) Maxi / (Argentina) Sanyo	6	7	6
2	(Spain) Lebrón / (Spain) Paquito	7	6	2

== Results ==
=== Round of 32 ===
Date	Winners	Score	Opponent	Refs.
27/11/2019	(Argentina) Juan Cruz Belluati (Argentina) Ramiro Moyano	7–5 / 6–2	(Spain) José Rico (Spain) Víctor Ruiz	
27/11/2019	(Spain) Coki Nieto (Spain) Javi Rico	6–1 / 6–1	(Mexico) Alejandro Fernández (Mexico) Rafael Romero	
27/11/2019	(Argentina) Franco Stupaczuk (Spain) Matías Díaz	6–2 / 6–0	(Mexico) Luis Ortega (Mexico) Pablo Acevedo	
27/11/2019	(Argentina) Cristian Gutiérrez Albizu (Argentina) Federico Quiles	5–7 / 6–2 / 7–5	(Argentina) Agustin Goméz Silingo (Argentina) Adrián Allemandi	
27/11/2019	(Spain) Gonzalo Rubio (Spain) Ernesto Moreno	6–2 / 6–4	(Uruguay) Diego Ramos (Spain) Rafael Méndez	
27/11/2019	(Spain) José García Diestro (Spain) Pincho Fernández	6–3 / 6–4	(Spain) Nacho Gadea (Argentina) Sebastián Nerone	
27/11/2019	(Spain) Alejandro Ruiz (Spain) Martin Sánchez Piñeiro	5–7 / 7–6 / 6–4	(Spain) Álvaro Cepero (Spain) Pablo Lijó	
27/11/2019	(Spain) Aday Santana (Brazil) Lucas Bergamini	6–4 / 6–4	(Spain) Javier Barahona (Spain) Momo González	
27/11/2019	(Spain) Javi Ruiz (Spain) Uri Botello	6–7 / 6–4 / 6–4	(Argentina) Maxi Grabiel (Argentina) Miguel Lamperti	
27/11/2019	(Argentina) Federico Chingotto (Argentina) Juan Tello	6–3 / 6–4	(Spain) Francisco Gil Morales (Spain) Sergio Alba Sánchez	
27/11/2019	(Brazil) Lucas Campagnolo (Argentina) Lucho Capra	6–3 / 6–1	(Spain) Adrián Blanco (Spain) Javier Martinez Vazquez	
27/11/2019	(Spain) Javi Garrido (Argentina) Martín Di Nenno	6–3 / 5–2 / W.O.	(Spain) Juani Mieres (Brazil) Marcello Jardim	

=== Round of 16 ===
Date	Winners	Score	Opponent	Refs.
28/11/2019	(Argentina) Maxi Sánchez (Argentina) Sanyo Gutiérrez	6–3 / 6–2	(Argentina) Juan Cruz Belluati (Argentina) Ramiro Moyano	
28/11/2019	(Argentina) Franco Stupaczuk (Spain) Matías Díaz	7–6 / 6–4	(Spain) Coki Nieto (Spain) Javi Rico	
28/11/2019	(Spain) Gonzalo Rubio (Spain) Ernesto Moreno	6–3 / 6–1	(Argentina) Cristian Gutiérrez Albizu (Argentina) Federico Quiles	
28/11/2019	(Spain) Alejandro Galán (Brazil) Pablo Lima	6–3 / 6–2	(Spain) José García Diestro (Spain) Pincho Fernández	
28/11/2019	(Spain) Alejandro Ruiz (Spain) Martin Sánchez Piñeiro	6–3 / 6–4	(Argentina) Agustín Tapia (Argentina) Fernando Belasteguín	
28/11/2019	(Spain) Javi Ruiz (Spain) Uri Botello	6–4 / 7–6	(Spain) Aday Santana (Brazil) Lucas Bergamini	
28/11/2019	(Brazil) Lucas Campagnolo (Argentina) Lucho Capra	3–6 / 6–4 / 6–3	(Argentina) Federico Chingotto (Argentina) Juan Tello	
28/11/2019	(Spain) Juan Lebrón (Spain) Paquito Navarro	6–2 / 6–3	(Spain) Javi Garrido (Argentina) Martín Di Nenno	

=== Quarter-Finals ===
Date	Winners	Score	Opponent	Refs.
29/11/2019	(Argentina) Maxi Sánchez (Argentina) Sanyo Gutiérrez	7–6 / 6–4	(Argentina) Franco Stupaczuk (Spain) Matías Díaz	
29/11/2019	(Spain) Alejandro Galán (Brazil) Pablo Lima	6–2 / 6–4	(Spain) Gonzalo Rubio (Spain) Ernesto Moreno	
29/11/2019	(Spain) Alejandro Ruiz (Spain) Martin Sánchez Piñeiro	6–2 / 7–5	(Spain) Javi Ruiz (Spain) Uri Botello	
29/11/2019	(Spain) Juan Lebrón (Spain) Paquito Navarro	6–3 / 6–4	(Brazil) Lucas Campagnolo (Argentina) Lucho Capra	

=== Semi-Finals ===
Date	Winners	Score	Opponent	Refs.
30/11/2019	(Argentina) Maxi Sánchez (Argentina) Sanyo Gutiérrez	4–6 / 6–4 / 6–3	(Spain) Alejandro Galán (Brazil) Pablo Lima	
30/11/2019	(Spain) Juan Lebrón (Spain) Paquito Navarro	6–3 / 6–1	(Spain) Alejandro Ruiz (Spain) Martin Sánchez Piñeiro	

=== Finals ===
Date	Winners	Score	Opponent	Refs.
1/12/2019	(Argentina) Maxi Sánchez (Argentina) Sanyo Gutiérrez	6–7 / 7–6 / 6–2	(Spain) Juan Lebrón (Spain) Paquito Navarro	
