= 2023 Germany Open =

Padel championships

- Date: 23 September – 1 October
- Edition: 1st
- Category: Open
- Location: Düsseldorf, Germany
- Venue: Castello Düsseldorf

Champions
- Men's doubles: (Spain) Alejandro Galán (Spain) Juan Lebrón
- Women's doubles: (Spain) Ariana Sánchez (Spain) Paula Josemaría

Chronology

The WPT 2023 Germany Open 1000 (officially WPT 2023 Boss German Open 1000) was the seventeenth tournament of the eleventh edition of World Padel Tour. The tournament was played between 23rd September and 1st October of 2023 at Castello Düsseldorf, Germany.

In the women's category, the first and second ranked pairs met in the finals once again, with the number one team, Ariana Sánchez and Paula Josemaría, winning their eleventh title of the season after defeating Gemma Triay and Marta Ortega in the finals.

In the men's category, the second and third ranked teams met in the finals, with Alejandro Galán and Juan Lebrón winning their second title of the season in five finals played, after defeating the number two rankeds Franco Stupaczuk and Martin Di Nenno.

== Schedule ==
The final draw was played:

- Thursday 27 September: Round of 32.
- Thursday 28 September: Round of 16.
- Friday 29 September: Quarterfinals.
- Saturday 30 September: Semifinals.
- Sunday 1 October: Finals.

== Results ==
=== Men's Bracket ===
Round of 32
1	(Spain) Coello / (Argentina) Tapia	6	6
(Argentina) A. Chozas / (Spain) A. Cepero	4	1
(Spain) I. Ramírez / (Spain) P.G. Rodrigo	6	6
WC	(Germany) J. Lindmeyer / (Germany) M. Wunner	1	1
(Spain) J. Ruiz / (Argentina) J.C. Belluati	4	4
(Brazil) L. Bergamini / (Spain) V. Ruiz	6	6
(Spain) J.G. Mora / (Spain) J.G. Barahona	1	2
8	(Spain) Coki / (Spain) J. Sanz	6	6
5	(Spain) A. Ruiz / (Argentina) J. Tello	4	6	6
(Spain) A. Sans / (Spain) T. Zapata	6	1	4
(Argentina) A. Gutiérrez / (Argentina) Sanyo	7	3	6
(Spain) A. Garcia / (Spain) M. Ortega	6	6	3
(Spain) E. Alonso / (Spain) M. Benitez	4	4
(Spain) J. Leal / (Spain) J.G. Diestro	6	6
(Spain) F. Gil / (Argentina) R. Moyano	3	4
3	(Spain) Galán / (Spain) Lebrón	6	6
4	(Argentina) Chingotto / (Spain) Paquito	6	6
(Spain) J. Bautista / (Spain) J. Muñoz	4	4
(Spain) F. Sotillo / (Spain) Pol Hernández	6	4	3
(Spain) D. Serrano / (Chile) J. Valdés	3	6	6
(Spain) E. Goenaga / (Spain) M. Quilez	6	3	6
(Spain) I. Vilariño / (Spain) S. Oria	2	6	2
(Germany) D. Lingen / (Germany) V. Jülich	1	1
6	(Argentina) F. Belasteguín / (Spain) Yanguas	6	6
7	(Spain) J. Garrido / (Spain) Momo	6	6
(Spain) J.M. Díaz / (Argentina) M. Lamperti	2	4
(Spain) P. Cardona / (Spain) P. Fernandez	3	4
(Argentina) L. Augsburger / (Argentina) V. Libaak	6	6
(Spain) L.H. Quesada / (Spain) J.J. Casas	7	3	2
(Spain) A. Ayats / (Spain) F. Guerrero	6	6	6
(Spain) A. Arroyo / (Spain) G. Rubio	2	1
2	(Argentina) F. Stupaczuk / (Argentina) Di Nenno	6	6

Round of 16
1	(Spain) Coello / (Argentina) Tapia	6	6
(Spain) I. Ramírez / (Spain) P.G. Rodrigo	1	3
(Brazil) L. Bergamini / (Spain) V. Ruiz	6	2
8	(Spain) Coki / (Spain) J. Sanz	7	3	*
5	(Spain) A. Ruiz / (Argentina) J. Tello	6	6
(Argentina) A. Gutiérrez / (Argentina) Sanyo	2	4
(Spain) J. Leal / (Spain) J.G. Diestro	1	1
3	(Spain) Galán / (Spain) Lebrón	6	6
4	(Argentina) Chingotto / (Spain) Paquito	6	6
(Spain) D. Serrano / (Chile) J. Valdés	3	3
(Spain) E. Goenaga / (Spain) M. Quilez	4	3
6	(Argentina) F. Belasteguín / (Spain) Yanguas	6	6
7	(Spain) J. Garrido / (Spain) Momo	7	4	4
(Argentina) L. Augsburger / (Argentina) V. Libaak	6	6	6
(Spain) A. Ayats / (Spain) F. Guerrero	4	1
2	(Argentina) Di Nenno / (Argentina) F. Stupaczuk	6	6

Quarter-Final
1	(Spain) Coello / (Argentina) Tapia	6	6	7
6	(Spain) Coki / (Spain) J. Sanz	3	7	6
5	(Spain) A. Ruiz / (Argentina) J. Tello	4	7	4
3	(Spain) Galán / (Spain) Lebrón	6	6	6
4	(Argentina) Chingotto / (Spain) Paquito	7	6
6	(Argentina) F. Belasteguín / (Spain) Yanguas	6	0
(Argentina) L. Augsburger / (Argentina) V. Libaak	4	2
2	(Argentina) F. Stupaczuk / (Argentina) Di Nenno	6	6

Semi-Finals
1	(Spain) Coello / (Argentina) Tapia	6	6	4
3	(Spain) Galán / (Spain) Lebrón	3	7	6
4	(Argentina) Chingotto / (Spain) Paquito	6	2	3
2	(Argentina) F. Stupaczuk / (Argentina) Di Nenno	0	6	6

Finals
3	(Spain) Galán / (Spain) Lebrón	6	6
2	(Argentina) F. Stupaczuk / (Argentina) Di Nenno	2	2

=== Women's Bracket ===
Round of 32
1	(Spain) A. Sánchez / (Spain) P. Josemaria
Bye
(Spain) A. Alonso / (Spain) A. Ustero	6	6
(Spain) J. Velasco / (Spain) N. Canovas	2	3
(Argentina) C. Jensen / (Spain) V. Virseda	6	6
(Spain) A. Perez / (Spain) P. Martínez	3	1
(France) A. Collombon / (Spain) L. Rufo	0	4
7	(Spain) Majo / (Spain) Mapi	6	6
5	(Spain) T. Icardo / (Argentina) V. Riera	6	6
(Spain) A.F. de Osso / (Spain) L. Arruabarrena	3	0
(Spain) E. Amatriaín / (France) L. Godallier	3	7	2
(Spain) M. Caparros / (Spain) T. Navarro	6	5	6
(Sweden) C. Navarro / (Spain) M. Guinart	7	6	3
(Portugal) A. Nogueira / (Spain) B. Caldera	6	7	6
Bye
4	(Spain) A. Salazar / (Portugal) S. Araújo
3	(Spain) B. González / (Argentina) D. Brea
Bye
(Spain) N. Rodriguez / (Spain) M. Talaván	6	6
(Germany) D. Höefer / (Germany) V. Kurz	0	2
(Spain) A. Martinez / (Spain) S. Ruiz	6	7
(Spain) M. Martínez / (Spain) S. Saiz	4	5
(Spain) C. Goenaga / (Spain) L. Martínez	7	3	3
8	(Spain) L. Sainz / (Spain) P. Llaguno	5	6	6
6	(Argentina) A. Osoro / (Spain) J. Castelló	2	7	6
(Spain) E. Carnicero / (Spain) M. Merino	6	5	0
(Spain) A. Soriano / (Spain) S. Bellver	7	1	4
(Spain) C. Fernandez / (Spain) V. Iglesias	5	6	6
(Italy) C. Orsi / (Spain) C. Mesa	4	6	6
(Spain) M. Barrera / (Spain) M. Villalba	6	3	2
Bye
2	(Spain) G. Triay / (Spain) M. Ortega

Round of 16
1	(Spain) A. Sánchez / (Spain) P. Josemaria	6	6
(Spain) A. Alonso / (Spain) A. Ustero	1	1
(Argentina) C. Jensen / (Spain) V. Virseda	6	6
7	(Spain) Majo / (Spain) Mapi	2	4
5	(Spain) T. Icardo / (Argentina) V. Riera	6	2
(Spain) M. Caparros / (Spain) T. Navarro	6	2
(Portugal) A. Nogueira / (Spain) B. Caldera	6	2	1
4	(Spain) A. Salazar / (Portugal) S. Araújo	4	6	6
3	(Spain) B. González / (Argentina) D. Brea	6	6
(Spain) N. Rodriguez / (Spain) M. Talaván	0	1
(Spain) A. Martinez / (Spain) S. Ruiz	1	2
8	(Spain) L. Sainz / (Spain) P. Llaguno	6	6
6	(Argentina) A. Osoro / (Spain) J. Castelló	3	7	2
(Spain) C. Fernandez / (Spain) V. Iglesias	6	5	6
(Italy) C. Orsi / (Spain) C. Mesa	3	4
2	(Spain) G. Triay / (Spain) M. Ortega	6	6

Quarter-Final
1	(Spain) A. Sánchez / (Spain) P. Josemaria	6	6
(Argentina) C. Jensen / (Spain) V. Virseda	4	4
5	(Spain) T. Icardo / (Argentina) V. Riera	7	4	6
4	(Spain) A. Salazar / (Portugal) S. Araújo	6	6	4
3	(Spain) B. González / (Argentina) D. Brea	6	4	3
8	(Spain) L. Sainz / (Spain) P. Llaguno	2	6	6
(Spain) C. Fernandez / (Spain) V. Iglesias	3	2
2	(Spain) G. Triay / (Spain) M. Ortega	6	6

Semi-Finals
1	(Spain) A. Sánchez / (Spain) P. Josemaria	*
5	(Spain) T. Icardo / (Argentina) V. Riera
8	(Spain) L. Sainz / (Spain) P. Llaguno	2	6
2	(Spain) G. Triay / (Spain) M. Ortega	6	7

Finals
1	(Spain) A. Sánchez / (Spain) P. Josemaria	6	7
2	(Spain) G. Triay / (Spain) M. Ortega	3	6

=== Round of 32 ===
Men's

Date	Winners	Score	Opponent	Refs.
27/9/2023	(Argentina) Agustín Tapia (Spain) Arturo Coello	6–4 / 6–1	(Argentina) Alex Chozas (Spain) Alvaro Cepero	
27/9/2023	(Spain) Iván Ramírez (Spain) Pablo García Rodrigo	6–1 / 6–1	(Germany) Johannes Lindmeyer (Germany) Matthias Wunner	
27/9/2023	(Brazil) Lucas Bergamini (Spain) Víctor Ruiz	6–4 / 6–4	(Spain) Javi Ruiz (Argentina) Juan Cruz Belluati	
27/9/2023	(Spain) Coki Nieto (Spain) Jon Sanz	6–1 / 6–2	(Spain) Javier García Mora (Spain) Javier Gonzalez Barahona	
27/9/2023	(Spain) Alex Ruiz (Argentina) Juan Tello	4–6 / 6–1 / 6–4	(Spain) Anton Sans (Spain) Teodoro Zapata	
27/9/2023	(Argentina) Agustín Gutiérrez (Argentina) Sanyo Gutiérrez	7–6 / 3–6 / 6–3	(Spain) Aitor Garcia (Spain) Mario Ortega	
27/9/2023	(Spain) Javier Leal (Spain) José García Diestro	6–4 / 6–4	(Spain) Eduardo Alonso (Spain) Miguel Benitez Lara	
27/9/2023	(Spain) Alejandro Galán (Spain) Juan Lebrón	6–3 / 6–4	(Spain) Francisco Gil (Argentina) Ramiro Moyano	
27/9/2023	(Argentina) Federico Chingotto (Spain) Paquito Navarro	6–4 / 6–4	(Spain) Jairo Bautista (Spain) Jaime Muñoz	
27/9/2023	(Chile) Javier Valdés (Spain) David Sanchez Serrano	3–6 / 6–4 / 6–3	(Spain) Ferran Sotillo (Spain) Pol Hernández	
27/9/2023	(Spain) Enrique Goenaga (Spain) Marc Quilez	6–2 / 3–6 / 6–2	(Spain) Ignacio Vilariño (Spain) Salvador Oria	
27/9/2023	(Argentina) Fernando Belasteguín (Spain) Miguel Yanguas	6–1 / 6–1	(Germany) Daniel Lingen (Germany) Vincent Jülich	
27/9/2023	(Spain) Javi Garrido (Spain) Momo González	6–2 / 6–4	(Spain) Juan Martín Díaz (Argentina) Miguel Lamperti	
27/9/2023	(Argentina) Leo Augsburger (Argentina) Valentino Libaak	6–3 / 6–4	(Spain) Pablo Cardona (Spain) Pincho Fernandez	
27/9/2023	(Spain) Arnau Ayats (Spain) Francisco Guerrero	6–7 / 6–3 / 6–2	(Spain) Luis Hernandez Quesada (Spain) Jose Jimenez Casas	
27/9/2023	(Argentina) Martin Di Nenno (Argentina) Franco Stupaczuk	6–2 / 6–1	(Spain) Alejandro Arroyo (Spain) Gonzalo Rubio	

Women's

Date	Winners	Score	Opponent	Refs.
27/9/2023	(Spain) Alejandra Alonso (Spain) Andrea Ustero	6–2 / 6–3	(Spain) Jimena Velasco (Spain) Noa Canovas	
27/9/2023	(Argentina) Claudia Jensen (Spain) Verónica Virseda	6–3 / 6–1	(Spain) Agueda Perez (Spain) Patricia Martínez	
27/9/2023	(Spain) Majo Sánchez Alayeto (Spain) Mapi Sánchez Alayeto	6–0 / 6–4	(France) Alix Collombon (Spain) Lorena Rufo	
27/9/2023	(Spain) Tamara Icardo (Argentina) Virginia Riera	6–3 / 6–0	(Spain) Ana Fernandez de Osso (Spain) Lara Arruabarrena	
27/9/2023	(Spain) Marta Caparros (Spain) Teresa Navarro	6–3 / 5–7 / 6–2	(Spain) Eli Amatriaín (France) Lea Godallier	
27/9/2023	(Portugal) Ana Catarina Nogueira (Spain) Beatriz Caldera	6–7 / 7–6 / 6–3	(Sweden) Carolina Navarro (Spain) Marina Guinart	
27/9/2023	(Spain) Nuria Rodriguez (Spain) Marta Talaván	6–0 / 6–2	(Germany) Denise Höefer (Germany) Victoria Kurz	
27/9/2023	(Spain) Araceli Martinez (Spain) Sara Ruiz Soto	6–4 / 7–5	(Spain) Marina Martínez (Spain) Sofía Saiz	
27/9/2023	(Spain) Lucía Sainz (Spain) Patty Llaguno	5–7 / 6–3 / 6–3	(Spain) Carmen Goenaga (Spain) Lucía Martínez	
27/9/2023	(Argentina) Aranza Osoro (Spain) Jessica Castelló	2–6 / 7–5 / 6–0	(Spain) Esther Carnicero (Spain) Melania Merino Saez	
27/9/2023	(Spain) Claudia Fernandez (Spain) Victoria Iglesias	5–7 / 6–1 / 6–4	(Spain) Arantxa Soriano (Spain) Sandra Bellver	
27/9/2023	(Italy) Carolina Orsi (Spain) Carla Mesa	4–6 / 6–3 / 6–2	(Spain) Marta Barrera (Spain) Mari Carmen Villalba	

=== Round of 16 ===
Men's

Date	Team A	Score	Team B	Refs.
28/9/2023	(Argentina) Agustín Tapia (Spain) Arturo Coello	6–1 / 6–3	(Spain) Iván Ramírez (Spain) Pablo García Rodrigo	
28/9/2023	(Spain) Coki Nieto (Spain) Jon Sanz	7–6 / 3–2 / W.O.	(Brazil) Lucas Bergamini (Spain) Víctor Ruiz	
28/9/2023	(Spain) Alex Ruiz (Argentina) Juan Tello	6–2 / 6–4	(Argentina) Agustín Gutiérrez (Argentina) Sanyo Gutiérrez	
28/9/2023	(Spain) Alejandro Galán (Spain) Juan Lebrón	6–1 / 6–1	(Spain) Javier Leal (Spain) José García Diestro	
28/9/2023	(Argentina) Federico Chingotto (Spain) Paquito Navarro	6–3 / 6–3	(Chile) Javier Valdés (Spain) David Sanchez Serrano	
28/9/2023	(Argentina) Fernando Belasteguín (Spain) Miguel Yanguas	6–4 / 6–3	(Spain) Enrique Goenaga (Spain) Marc Quilez	
28/9/2023	(Argentina) Leo Augsburger (Argentina) Valentino Libaak	6–7 / 6–4 / 6–4	(Spain) Javi Garrido (Spain) Momo González	
28/9/2023	(Argentina) Martin Di Nenno (Argentina) Franco Stupaczuk	6–4 / 6–1	(Spain) Arnau Ayats (Spain) Francisco Guerrero	

Women's

Date	Team A	Score	Team B	Refs.
28/9/2023	(Spain) Ariana Sánchez (Spain) Paula Josemaria	6–1 / 6–1	(Spain) Alejandra Alonso (Spain) Andrea Ustero	
28/9/2023	(Argentina) Claudia Jensen (Spain) Verónica Virseda	6–2 / 6–4	(Spain) Majo Sánchez Alayeto (Spain) Mapi Sánchez Alayeto	
28/9/2023	(Spain) Tamara Icardo (Argentina) Virginia Riera	6–2 / 6–2	(Spain) Marta Caparros (Spain) Teresa Navarro	
28/9/2023	(Spain) Alejandra Salazar (Portugal) Sofia Araújo	4–6 / 6–2 / 6–1	(Portugal) Ana Catarina Nogueira (Spain) Beatriz Caldera	
28/9/2023	(Spain) Bea González (Argentina) Delfina Brea	6–0 / 6–1	(Spain) Nuria Rodriguez (Spain) Marta Talaván	
28/9/2023	(Spain) Lucía Sainz (Spain) Patty Llaguno	6–1 / 6–2	(Spain) Araceli Martinez (Spain) Sara Ruiz Soto	
28/9/2023	(Spain) Claudia Fernandez (Spain) Victoria Iglesias	6–3 / 5–7 / 6–2	(Argentina) Aranza Osoro (Spain) Jessica Castelló	
28/9/2023	(Spain) Gemma Triay (Spain) Marta Ortega	6–3 / 6–4	(Italy) Carolina Orsi (Spain) Carla Mesa	

=== Quarter-Finals ===
Men's

Date	Team A	Score	Team B	Refs.
29/9/2023	(Argentina) Agustín Tapia (Spain) Arturo Coello	6–3 / 6–7 / 7–6	(Spain) Coki Nieto (Spain) Jon Sanz	
29/9/2023	(Spain) Alejandro Galán (Spain) Juan Lebrón	6–4 / 6–7 / 6–4	(Spain) Alex Ruiz (Argentina) Juan Tello	
29/9/2023	(Argentina) Federico Chingotto (Spain) Paquito Navarro	7–6 / 6–0	(Argentina) Fernando Belasteguín (Spain) Miguel Yanguas	
29/9/2023	(Argentina) Martin Di Nenno (Argentina) Franco Stupaczuk	6–4 / 6–2	(Argentina) Leo Augsburger (Argentina) Valentino Libaak	

Women's

Date	Team A	Score	Team B	Refs.
29/9/2023	(Spain) Ariana Sánchez (Spain) Paula Josemaria	6–4 / 6–4	(Argentina) Claudia Jensen (Spain) Verónica Virseda	
29/9/2023	(Spain) Tamara Icardo (Argentina) Virginia Riera	7–6 / 4–6 / 6–4	(Spain) Alejandra Salazar (Portugal) Sofia Araújo	
29/9/2023	(Spain) Lucía Sainz (Spain) Patty Llaguno	2–6 / 6–4 / 6–3	(Spain) Bea González (Argentina) Delfina Brea	
29/9/2023	(Spain) Gemma Triay (Spain) Marta Ortega	6–3 / 6–2	(Spain) Claudia Fernandez (Spain) Victoria Iglesias	

=== Semi-Finals ===
Men's

Date	Team A	Score	Team B	Refs.
30/9/2023	(Spain) Alejandro Galán (Spain) Juan Lebrón	3–6 / 7–6 / 6–4	(Argentina) Agustín Tapia (Spain) Arturo Coello	
30/9/2023	(Argentina) Martin Di Nenno (Argentina) Franco Stupaczuk	0–6 / 6–2 / 6–3	(Argentina) Federico Chingotto (Spain) Paquito Navarro	

Women's

Date	Team A	Score	Team B	Refs.
30/9/2023	(Spain) Ariana Sánchez (Spain) Paula Josemaria	W.O.	(Spain) Tamara Icardo (Argentina) Virginia Riera	
30/9/2023	(Spain) Gemma Triay (Spain) Marta Ortega	6–2 / 7–6	(Spain) Lucía Sainz (Spain) Patty Llaguno	

=== Finals ===
Men's

Date	Team A	Score	Team B	Refs.
1/10/2023	(Spain) Alejandro Galán (Spain) Juan Lebrón	6–2 / 6–2	(Argentina) Martin Di Nenno (Argentina) Franco Stupaczuk	

Women's

Date	Team A	Score	Team B	Refs.
1/10/2023	(Spain) Ariana Sánchez (Spain) Paula Josemaria	6–3 / 7–6	(Spain) Gemma Triay (Spain) Marta Ortega	
