= 2022 Milano P1 =

Padel championships

- Date: 5 – 11 December
- Edition: 1st
- Category: P1
- Prize money: € 250,000
- Location: Milan, Italy
- Venue: Allianz Cloud

Champions
- Men's doubles: (Spain) Alejandro Galán (Spain) Juan Lebrón

Chronology
Previous
Mexico Major
Next
Master Final (WPT)

The 2022 Milano P1 was the eight tournament of the season organized by Premier Padel, promoted by the International Padel Federation, and with the financial backing of Nasser Al-Khelaïfi's Qatar Sports Investments.

Alejandro Galán and Juan Lebrón, FIP number 1 ranked team, defeated Lucas Bergamini and Victor Ruiz, FIP number 13 ranked team, in the final, winning their fourth title in the circuit.

== Seeds ==
1. (Spain) Alejandro Galán / (Spain) Juan Lebrón (winners)
2. (Argentina) Juan Tello / (Spain) Paquito Navarro (semi-finals)
3. (Argentina) Franco Stupaczuk / (Brazil) Pablo Lima (round of 16)
4. (Spain) Arturo Coello / (Argentina) Fernando Belasteguín (semi-finals)
5. (Spain) Coki Nieto / (Argentina) Martin Di Nenno (second round)
6. (Spain) Aléx Ruiz / (Spain) Jerónimo González (quarter-finals)
7. (Argentina) Federico Chingotto / (Spain) Javier Garrido (quarter-finals)
8. (Argentina) Lucho Capra / (Argentina) Maxi Sanchéz (round of 16)

== Results ==
Round of 32
1	(Spain) Galán/ (Spain) Lebrón	6	6
(Spain) A. Mercadal / (Spain) R. Martinez	2	4
(Spain) G. Campos / (Spain) R. Rivera	7	4	1
14	(Spain) I. Ramírez / (Spain) R.M. Duran	6	6	6
15	(Spain) J.G. Diestro / (Spain) P. Fernandéz	6	3
(Spain) E. Goenaga / (Spain) L.H. Quesada	7	6
(Italy) M. Cassetta / (Italy) S. Cremona	1	3
6	(Spain) A. Ruíz / (Spain) Momo	6	6
5	(Spain) Coki / (Argentina) Di Nenno
(Spain) M. Semmler / (Spain) J. Serrano	*
(France) B. Tison / (Argentina) F. Domínguez	6	6
16	(Spain) A. Cépero / (Argentina) M. Lamperti	3	4
11	(Spain) A. Arroyo / (Spain) G. Rubio
(Spain) J.G. Barahona / (Spain) J.G. Mora	*
(Spain) I. Vilariño / (Spain) J. Muñoz	2	4
4	(Argentina) Belasteguín / (Spain) Coello	6	6
3	(Argentina) F. Stupaczuk / (Brazil) Lima	3	6	7
(Spain) M. Quilez / (Spain) T. Bueno	6	1	5
(Argentina) E. Iriart / (Spain) M. Cordoba	3	3
13	(Brazil) L. Bergamini / (Spain) V. Ruiz	6	6
10	(Argentina) A. Silingo / (Argentina) J.C. Belluati	3	4
(Argentina) F. Mouriño / (Spain) V. Mena Gil	6	6
(Argentina) D. Perino/ (Spain) S. Alba	2	3
8	(Argentina) L. Capra / (Argentina) Maxi	6	6
7	(Argentina) Chingotto / (Spain) J. Garrido	6	6
(Spain) J. Bautista / (Spain) M. del Castillo	4	4
(Spain) J. Moya / (Spain) P. Cardona	6	6	4
12	(Spain) J. Leal / (Spain) Yanguas	3	7	6
14	(Brazil) L. Campagnolo / (Spain) J. Sanz	6	6
(Spain) M.G. García / (Spain) J.L. Gonzalez	4	2
(Spain) E. Alonso / (Spain) J. Esbri	4	6
2	(Argentina) J. Tello / (Spain) Paquito	6	7

Round of 16
1	(Spain) Galán / (Spain) Lebrón	6	6
14	(Spain) I. Ramírez / (Spain) R.M. Duran	2	4
(Spain) E. Goenaga / (Spain) L.H. Quesada	6	3
6	(Spain) A. Ruíz / (Spain) Momo	7	6
(Spain) J. Serrano / (Spain) M. Semmler	1	6	6
(France) B. Tison / (Argentina) F. Domínguez	6	3	4
(Spain) J.G. Barahona / (Spain) J.G. Mora	3	2
4	(Argentina) Belasteguín / (Spain) Coello	6	6
3	(Argentina) F. Stupaczuk / (Brazil) Lima	5	2
13	(Brazil) L. Bergamini / (Spain) V. Ruiz	7	6
(Argentina) F. Mouriño / (Spain) V. Mena Gil	3	7	3
8	(Argentina) L. Capra / (Argentina) Maxi	6	6	6
7	(Argentina) Chingotto / (Spain) J. Garrido	6	6
12	(Spain) J. Leal / (Spain) Yanguas	1	4
14	(Brazil) L. Campagnolo / (Spain) J. Sanz
2	(Argentina) Juan Tello / (Spain) Paquito	*

Quarterfinals
1	(Spain) Galán / (Spain) Lebrón	7	6
6	(Spain) A. Ruíz / (Spain) Momo	5	1
(Spain) M. Semmler / (Spain) J. Serrano	3	4
4	(Argentina) Belasteguín / (Spain) Coello	6	6
13	(Brazil) L. Bergamini / (Spain) V. Ruiz	6	6
8	(Argentina) L. Capra / (Argentina) Maxi	4	2
7	(Argentina) Chingotto / (Spain) J. Garrido	3	6	5
2	(Argentina) Juan Tello / (Spain) Paquito	6	3	7

Semifinals
1	(Spain) Galán / (Spain) Lebrón	6	6
4	(Argentina) Belasteguín / (Spain) Coello	2	3
13	(Brazil) L. Bergamini / (Spain) V. Ruiz	7	2	6
2	(Argentina) J. Tello / (Spain) Paquito	5	6	3

Final
1	(Spain) Galán / (Spain) Lebrón	6	6
13	(Brazil) L. Bergamini / (Spain) V. Ruiz	2	2

=== First Round ===
Date	Winners	Score	Opponent	Refs.
6/12/2022	(Spain) Adriá Mercadal (Spain) Ricardo Martinez Sanchez	6–4 / 6–1	(Spain) Diego Gil Batista (Spain) Fran Ramirez	
6/12/2022	(Spain) Gaspar Campos (Spain) RubénRivera	4–6 / 7–5 / 6–3	(France) Jeremy Scatena (Spain) Roger Aromi	
6/12/2022	(Spain) Enrique Goenaga (Spain) Luis Hernandez Quesada	6–7 / 6–1 / 6–3	(Brazil) Chico Gomes (Argentina) Ignacio Sager	
6/12/2022	(Italy) Marco Cassetta (Italy) Simone Cremona	6–3 / 6–3	(Italy) Daniele Cattaneo (Italy) Lorenzo Di Giovanni	
6/12/2022	(Spain) Jose David Sanchez Serrano (Spain) Miguel Semmler	6–3 / 6–4	(Spain) Anton Sans (Spain) Teodoro Zapata	
6/12/2022	(France) Benjamin Tison (Argentina) Facundo Domínguez	7–6 / 6–4	(Spain) Carlos Marti (Spain) Mario Ortega	
6/12/2022	(Spain) Javier Gonzalez Barahona (Spain) Javier García Mora	6–4 / 6–4	(France) Maxime Moreau (Italy) Riccardo Sinicropi	
6/12/2022	(Spain) Ignacio Vilariño (Spain) Jaime Muñoz	7–6 / 7–6	(Spain) Francisco Guerrero (Spain) Jaime Menendez	
6/12/2022	(Spain) Marc Quilez (Spain) Toni Bueno	7–6 / 7–6	(Spain) Antonio Luque (Spain) Javier Martinez	
6/12/2022	(Argentina) Emiliano Iriart (Spain) Marcos Cordoba	6–1 / 6–2	(Spain) Mario Del Castillo (Spain) Jairo Bautista	
6/12/2022	(Argentina) Federico Mouriño (Spain) Victor Mena Gil	6–3 / 6–3	(Argentina) Matías Díaz (France) Thomas Leygue	
6/12/2022	(Argentina) Denis Perino (Spain) Sergio Alba	6–4 / 6–3	(Spain) Arnau Ayats (Chile) Javier Valdes	
6/12/2022	(Spain) Jairo Bautista (Spain) Mario del Castillo	2–6 / 6–3 / 6–4	(Spain) Jorge Ruiz Gutiérrez (Spain) Salvador Oria	
6/12/2022	(Spain) Jesus Moya (Spain) Pablo Cardona	6–3 / 6–3	(Spain) Aitor Garcia Bassas (Spain) Pedro Vera Castillo	
6/12/2022	(Spain) Miguel González García (Spain) Jose Luis Gonzalez	6–0 / 6–3	(Argentina) Aris Patiniotis (Argentina) Cristian German Gutiérrez	
6/12/2022	(Spain) Eduardo Alonso (Spain) Juanlu Esbri	6–3 / 6–4	(Spain) Aday Santana (Argentina) Nicolás Suescun	

=== Round of 32 ===
Date	Winners	Score	Opponent	Refs.
7/12/2022	(Spain) Alejandro Galán (Spain) Juan Lebrón	6–2 / 6–4	(Spain) Adriá Mercadal (Spain) Ricardo Martinez Sanchez	
7/12/2022	(Spain) Iván Ramírez (Spain) Raúl Marcos Duran	6–7 / 6–4 / 6–1	(Spain) Gaspar Campos (Spain) Rubén Rivera	
7/12/2022	(Spain) José García Diestro (Spain) Pincho Fernandez	7–6 / 6–3	(Spain) Enrique Goenaga (Spain) Luis Hernandez Quesada	
7/12/2022	(Spain) Alex Ruiz (Spain) Momo Gonzalez	6–1 / 6–3	(Italy) Marco Cassetta (Italy) Simone Cremona	
7/12/2022	(Spain) Jose David Sanchez Serrano (Spain) Miguel Semmler	W.O.	(Spain) Coki Nieto (Argentina) Martin Di Nenno	
7/12/2022	(France) Benjamin Tison (Argentina) Facundo Domínguez	6–3 / 6–4	(Spain) Alvaro Cepero (Argentina) Miguel Lamperti	
7/12/2022	(Spain) Javier Gonzalez Barahona (Spain) Javier García Mora	W.O.	(Spain) Alex Arroyo (Spain) Gonzalo Rubio	
7/12/2022	(Spain) Arturo Coello (Argentina) Fernando Belasteguín	6–2 / 6–4	(Spain) Ignacio Vilariño (Spain) Jaime Muñoz	
7/12/2022	(Argentina) Franco Stupaczuk (Brazil) Pablo Lima	3–6 / 6–1 / 7–5	(Spain) Marc Quilez (Spain) Toni Bueno	
7/12/2022	(Brazil) Lucas Bergamini (Spain) Víctor Ruiz	6–3 / 6–3	(Argentina) Emiliano Iriart (Spain) Marcos Cordoba	
7/12/2022	(Argentina) Federico Mouriño (Spain) Victor Mena Gil	6–3 / 6–4	(Argentina) Agustin Gomez Silingo (Argentina) Juan Cruz Belluati	
7/12/2022	(Argentina) Lucho Capra (Argentina) Maxi Sánchez	6–2 / 6–3	(Argentina) Denis Perino (Spain) Sergio Alba	
7/12/2022	(Argentina) Federico Chingotto (Spain) Javi Garrido	6–1 / 6–4	(Spain) Jairo Bautista (Spain) Mario del Castillo	
7/12/2022	(Spain) Javier Leal (Spain) Mike Yanguas	3–6 / 7–6 / 6–4	(Spain) Jesus Moya (Spain) Pablo Cardona	
7/12/2022	(Brazil) Lucas Campagnolo (Spain) Jon Sanz	6–4 / 6–2	(Spain) Miguel González García (Spain) Jose Luis Gonzalez	
7/12/2022	(Argentina) Juan Tello (Spain) Paquito Navarro	6–4 / 7–6	(Spain) Eduardo Alonso (Spain) Juanlu Esbri	

=== Round of 16 ===
Date	Winners	Score	Opponent	Refs.
8/12/2022	(Spain) Alejandro Galán (Spain) Juan Lebrón	6–2 / 6–4	(Spain) Iván Ramírez (Spain) Raúl Marcos Duran	
8/12/2022	(Spain) Alex Ruiz (Spain) Momo Gonzalez	7–6 / 6–3	(Spain) José García Diestro (Spain) Pincho Fernandez	
8/12/2022	(Spain) Jose David Sanchez Serrano (Spain) Miguel Semmler	1–6 / 6–3 / 6–4	(France) Benjamin Tison (Argentina) Facundo Domínguez	
8/12/2022	(Spain) Arturo Coello (Argentina) Fernando Belasteguín	6–3 / 6–2	(Spain) Javier Gonzalez Barahona (Spain) Javier García Mora	
8/12/2022	(Brazil) Lucas Bergamini (Spain) Víctor Ruiz	7–5 / 6–2	(Argentina) Franco Stupaczuk (Brazil) Pablo Lima	
8/12/2022	(Argentina) Lucho Capra (Argentina) Maxi Sánchez	6–3 / 6–7 / 6–3	(Argentina) Federico Mouriño (Spain) Victor Mena Gil	
8/12/2022	(Argentina) Federico Chingotto (Spain) Javi Garrido	6–1 / 6–4	(Spain) Javier Leal (Spain) Mike Yanguas	
8/12/2022	(Argentina) Juan Tello (Spain) Paquito Navarro	W.O.	(Brazil) Lucas Campagnolo (Spain) Jon Sanz	

=== Quarter-Finals ===
Date	Winners	Score	Opponent	Refs.
9/12/2022	(Spain) Alejandro Galán (Spain) Juan Lebrón	7–5 / 6–1	(Spain) Alex Ruiz (Spain) Momo Gonzalez	
9/12/2022	(Spain) Arturo Coello (Argentina) Fernando Belasteguín	6–3 / 6–4	(Spain) Jose David Sanchez Serrano (Spain) Miguel Semmler	
9/12/2022	(Brazil) Lucas Bergamini (Spain) Víctor Ruiz	6–4 / 6–2	(Argentina) Lucho Capra (Argentina) Maxi Sánchez	
9/12/2022	(Argentina) Juan Tello (Spain) Paquito Navarro	6–3 / 3–6 / 7–5	(Argentina) Federico Chingotto (Spain) Javi Garrido	

=== Semi-Finals ===
Date	Winners	Score	Opponent	Refs.
10/12/2022	(Spain) Alejandro Galán (Spain) Juan Lebrón	6–2 / 6–3	(Spain) Arturo Coello (Argentina) Fernando Belasteguín	
10/12/2022	(Brazil) Lucas Bergamini (Spain) Víctor Ruiz	7–5 / 2–6 / 6–3	(Argentina) Juan Tello (Spain) Paquito Navarro	

=== Finals ===
Date	Winners	Score	Opponent	Refs.
11/12/2022	(Spain) Alejandro Galán (Spain) Juan Lebrón	6–2 / 6–2	(Brazil) Lucas Bergamini (Spain) Víctor Ruiz	

== Points distribution ==
Below is a series of tables showing the ranking points and money a player can earn.

Event	First round	Second Round	Round of 16	QF	SF	F	W
Points	18	45	90	180	300	600	1000
