= Juan Lebrón Chincoa =

Spanish padel player (born 1995)

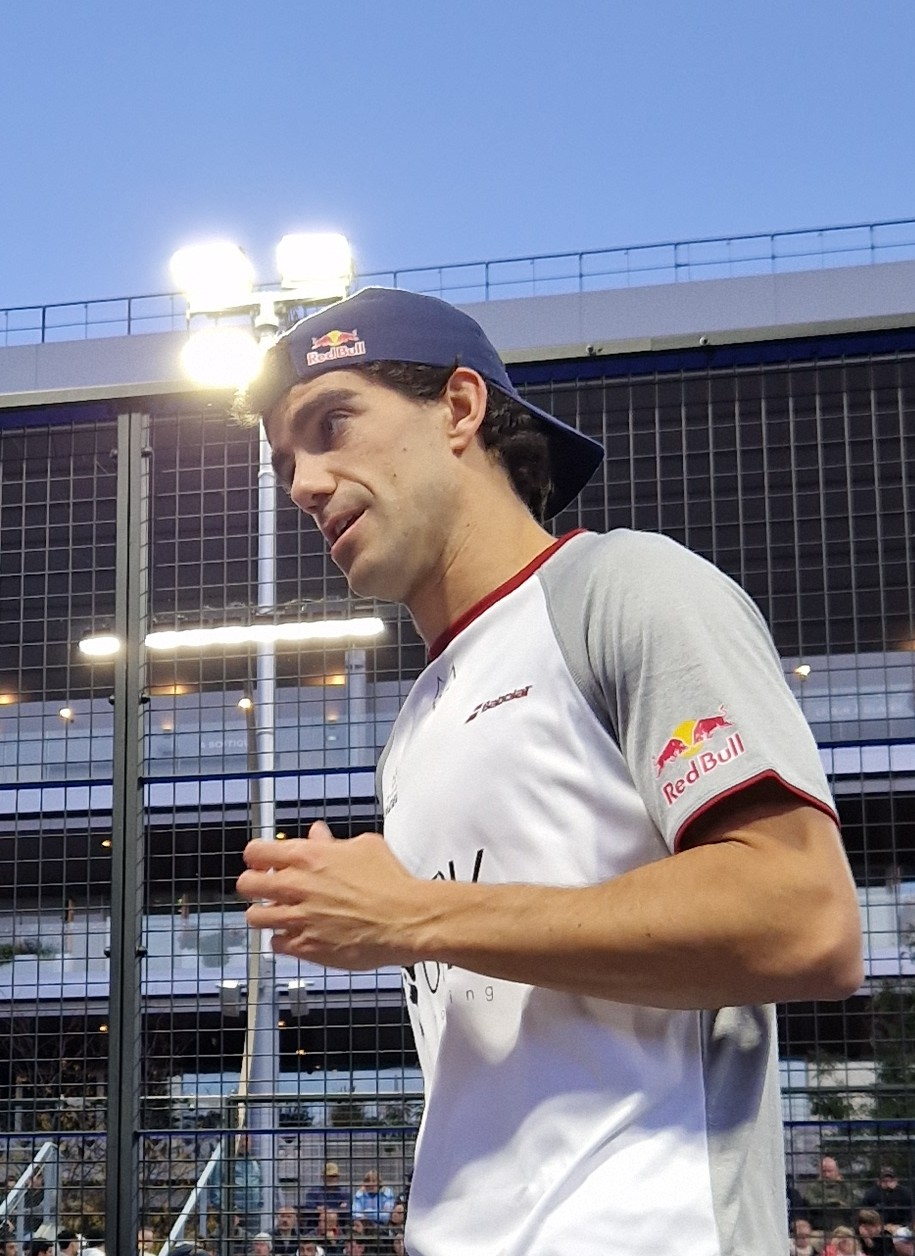

Personal information
- Nickname: "El Lobo"
- Citizenship: Spanish
- Born: 30 January 1995 (age 31) El Puerto de Santa María, Andalusia, Spain
- Height: 1.85 m (6 ft 1 in)

Sport
- Country: Spain
- Sport: Padel
- Position: Drive (Right-side)
- Rank: 6th
- Partner: Leandro Augsburger

Achievements and titles
- World finals: 2021
- Highest world ranking: 1st (2019, 2020, 2021, 2022)
- Updated on 23 August 2026

Juan Lebrón Chincoa (born 30 January 1995), widely known by his nickname 'El Lobo' (The Wolf), is a Spanish professional padel player. As of January 2026, he occupies the 6th position in the FIP ranking.

Lebrón became the first Spanish player in history to become World Number 1, doing so in 2019 alongside Paquito Navarro, a position he would maintain for three more years with Alejandro Galán.

During his career he has won 42 titles and appeared in 71 finals.

== Career ==
=== Early life ===
Juan Lebrón was introduced to padel through his father, who played it with his friends. Lebrón became Spain’s junior padel champion several times and competed in the Junior World Cup. He was the youngest Absolute Champion in Spain and won every match in the minor’s division. At the age of 17, he left El Puerto de Santa Maria and moved to Madrid to play padel professionally.

=== First Years as a pro ===
Lebrón’s professional career began in 2015, and in December 2016, he and his then partner, Gabriel Reca, reached the top 30 in the world.

In March 2017, he started the season with Marcello Jardim and finished it with Adrián Allemandi, finishing in 19th place. The same year he signed a contract with Babolat.

=== Breakthrough year ===
==== 2018 ====
In 2018, Lebrón started the season with Juan Cruz Belluati. In the first tournament of the season, the Catalunya Masters, they reached their first final as a pair after beating the world number 1s, Fernando Belasteguín and Pablo Lima, in the semifinals. In the final, Maxi Sánchez & Sanyo Gutiérrez defeated them 6-4 and 6-2. However, in the following six tournaments, they reached only two semifinals, failing to advance in either.

The season's second final came at the Mijas Open, where they lost the rematch of the Catalunya final, against Maxi & Sanyo. After three more tournaments with mixed results, 14-time world number one Juan Martín Díaz invited Lebrón to be his new partner. In the four tournaments they played together, they reached two quarterfinals and two semifinals, including the Master Final, for which Lebrón qualified for the first time by finishing the season ranked 13th.

=== Partnership with Paquito Navarro ===
==== 2019 ====
For the 2019 season, Lebrón became Paquito Navarro's new partner. In their first tournament of the season, the Marbella Master, they reached the final, where they fell to the number 1s, Maxi Sánchez & Sanyo Gutiérrez. They would reach the final of the next tournament, but would once again lose to Maxi & Sanyo.

Their first success came at the Alicante Open, where they defeated former three time world number ones Fernando Belasteguín & Pablo Lima to win their first tournament together. They would lose again to Maxi & Sanyo at the Vigo Open, but would finally beat them to win their second title at the Jaén Open.

Despite a quarter-final loss in Buenos Aires, Lebrón and Paquito would win the Valladolid Master and the Swedish Open, reaching the halfway of the season with seven finals and four titles, and establishing themselves as a threat to Maxi and Sanyo number one rank.

They could not repeat their results in the next five tournaments, but kept close in the ranking race due to their rivals inconsistent results. On the fourtheen tournament of the season they would reach the finals, but weren't able to win it. They would also reach and win the finals of the São Paulo Open, where after beating Agustín Tapia & Fernando Belasteguín in the semi-finals Lebrón reached the number one ranking spot, becoming along with Paquito the first Spanish pair to reach the top of the rankings.

Lebrón and Paquito would secure the number 1 ranking at the end of the season after reaching the finals of the Mexico Open, the penultimate tournament of the season. In the final they lost against Maxi Sánchez & Sanyo Gutiérrez in two sets. They would conclude the season with a semi-final exit in the Master Final.

=== Partnership with Alejandro Galán ===
==== 2020 ====
Surprisingly, Paquito Navarro chose to end the partnership, teaming up with his former partner Pablo Lima, while Lebrón joined Lima's former partner, Alejandro Galán. They started the new season facing their former partners, Lima & Paquito, in the final of the Marbella Master and losing in three sets. Three months later, after the return from the Covid-19 stoppage, they avenged their loss in the previous tournaments, winning the Estrella Damm Open. They followed their triumph winning the Vuelve a Madrid, Adeslas, and Valencia Open's.

In the next two tournament, Galán and Lebrón would be eliminated in the semi-finals, by Javier Ruiz & Uri Botello in the Sardegna Open, and Franco Stupaczuk & Sanyo Gutiérrez in the Menorca Open. They bounced back by winning the Barcelona Master and the Alicante Open.

After being knocked out in the semi-finals of the Las Rozas Open, with the number one ranking spot already locked, the Spanish pair competed in the Master Final, where they reached the finals to face Agustín Tapia & Fernando Belasteguín, losing 6–3 and 7–6.

==== 2021 ====
Galán and Lebrón started 2021 reaching the quarter finals of the Madrid Open, where they lost to in three sets to Alex Ruiz & Franco Stupaczuk. They avenged their loss in the final of the next tournament, winning the Alicante Open. In the next tournament they were eliminated in the semi-finals against Martín Di Nenno & Paquito Navarro, which would be their main rivals in the season.

The Spanish pair reacted winning the next two tournaments, in Santander and Marbella. After an elimination in the Valladolid Master semi-finals, they faced then second ranked pair Fernando Belasteguín & Sanyo Gutiérrez in the final of the Valencia Open, losing in three sets. Having failed to reach the finals in the two previous tournaments, they returned from the summer break in the Portugal Master, reaching the finals and winning.

In the last eight tournament remaining they reached only two finals, in Lugo and Menorca, winning both of them but leaving the ranking race open. Because of their setbacks, along with the strong results of Di Nenno & Paquito, Galán and Lebrón arrived at the Master Final, WPT last tournament of the season, needing to outperform their rivals to retain the number 1 ranking. Something they would manage to, with Di Nenno and Paquito elimination in the semis by Agustín Tapia & Sanyo Gutiérrez, whom they next defeated in the finals.

==== 2022 ====
In their third season together, Galán and Lebrón started 2022 with an early exit in the Miami Open. The result was followed by three tournament finals losses, the first against the third ranked pair Agustín Tapia & Sanyo Gutiérrez in the Reus Open, followed by two losses against the second ranked team Martín Di Nenno & Paquito Navarro in the Vigo Open, and the Qatar Major, Premier Padel's first tournament ever.

They reacted winning the Alicante and Brussels Open's. A quarter-final loss in Denmark did not affect as they won the Premier's Padel Italy Major and the Marbella Master. In the next four World Padel Tour tournaments, despite reaching the finals in all of them, they could only win the Valladolid Master, losing in Austria, France, and Valencia, but still won the Paris Major in Premier Padel.

An early exit in the Málaga Open, the last WPT tournament before the summer break, was followed by a title win in the Madrid P1. After returning to WPT competition, they won five out eight tournaments, including the Portugal Open, the Swedish Open, the Menorca Open, the Malmö Open and the Buenos Aires Master.

Lebrón and Galán finished the year winning the Master Final and the Milan P1, finishing the year comfortably in first ranking spot.

==== 2023 ====
In 2023, they had a rought start reaching only two finals in the first seven tournaments, the first one a Premier Padel comepetion. The two finals losses came against Agustín Tapia & Arturo Coello who had won the six WPT tournaments, which made the Vigo Open final between Galán & Lebrón and Coello & Tapia a battle for the number one spot, which the latter won.

During the Danish Open 1000 they had to withdraw due to a Lebrón injury, which would sideline him for the next two months, missing five tournaments. In the meantime Galán played with Jon Sanz. After Lebrón return from injury, Galán and Lebrón won four out seven tournaments, including the Finland, Germany, Menorca, and Malmö Open's.

In the last two tournament of the year, they won the Milan P1 against Franco Stupaczuk & Martín Di Nenno, but lost the Master Final, where they reached the finals against Federico Chingotto & Paquito Navarro, in the final tournament of the circuit.

==== 2024 ====
In 2024, now with Premier Padel as the main circuit, Galán and Lebrón started the year defeating Coello & Tapia to in three sets at the finals of the Riyadh P1. In the next tournament they had an early exit against Javi Garrido & Mike Yanguas, in a controversial game that led Galán to decide to separate from Lebrón. They played their last tournament together in the Acapulco P1, losing in the finals against Agustín Tapia & Arturo Coello.

=== Different partners ===
For the remainder of the 2024 season, Lebrón shuffled through different partners. First he teamed with Momo Gonzalez, as a temporary solution, in the Puerto Cabello P2, exiting in the round of 16. He opted to reform the partnership with Paquito Navarro, the partner with whom he became No. 1, starting as the second seeded team.

Lebrón and Paquito began their partnership with a quarterfinal exit in Brussels. In the seven next tournaments, the Spanish duo reached six semifinals, losing four of them to world number ones Arturo Coello & Agustín Tapia, and one to Franco Stupaczuk and Martín Di Nenno, in Seville (Paquito's hometown). The remaining loss came in the first face-off with Galán since their split, at the Genoa P2, where they were defeated in three sets.

Not considering merely reaching finals to be enough, Lebrón chose to part ways with Paquito, opting to return to playing on the left and teaming up with Martín Di Nenno.

Lebrón’s start in the position, which he hadn't played since 2018, was excellent, as he won the Finland P2. However, in the season's remaining eight tournaments, Di Nenno and Lebrón failed to reach another final, losing all six semifinals they played against the world's No. 1 and No. 2 pairs.

Their final tournament as a team would be the Premier Padel Finals, where they were once again defeated by Coello & Tapia.

=== Partnership with Franco Stupaczuk ===
==== 2025 ====
For the 2025 season, Lebrón returned to the drive position to partner with Franco Stupaczuk. Lebrón and Stupaczuk started the season strong by reaching the final of the Riyadh P1, where they were defeated by Agustín Tapia & Arturo Coello in three sets. They maintained their good momentum by reaching the finals in Cancún, Miami, and Santiago, winning the first and losing the other two to Chingotto and Galán. To reach the Miami final, they eliminated Coello and Tapia in the semifinals, keeping the world number ones out of a final for the first time in 11 months.

However, due to physical issues affecting Stupaczuk, the pair missed the Qatar Major, while in Brussels, Lebrón delivered a modest performance alongside Alex Ruiz. Following Stupaczuk's return, they suffered two quarter-final exits and a three-set loss in the Italy Major semi-finals against Galán and Chingotto. They avenged that defeat, however, at the subsequent tournament in Valladolid, where they advanced to the final.

Due to physical issues, Lebrón would not compete in the next two tournaments, wrapping up the first half of the season with a semifinal loss to Chingotto & Galán. Results deteriorated in the second half of the season, with the Spanish-Argentine duo reaching only four out of eight possible semifinals, winning none of them, and often engaging in heated arguments. Thus, the two opted to part ways, with Lebrón joining Leandro Augsburger and Stupaczuk reuniting with Martín Di Nenno for the third time.

Augsburger and Lebrón would play only two tournaments together. First the Mexico Major, where they reached the semifinals, and then the Premier Padel Finals, where they were eliminated in the quarterfinals by their former partners, Di Nenno and Stupaczuk. With these results throughout the year, Lebrón finished the season ranked 6th, ending outside the top 5 for the third consecutive year, having placed 6th in 2023 and 7th in 2024.

== Influence ==
Lebrón's success has significantly contributed to the growing popularity of padel. His presence as the only Spanish player to reach World Number 1 has made him a role model for aspiring players and racquet sports enthusiasts worldwide. Lebrón is “credited with bringing innovative strategies and a higher level of athleticism to the sport, which will undoubtedly influence padel’s development for years to come.”

Lebrón engages with fans and promotes the sport through platforms such as Instagram.

== Honours ==
=== World Padel Tour (2013–2023) ===
Winner Runner-up

==== Finals ====
N.º	Date	Tournament	Partner	Result	Opponents in the final	Career title No.
2018
1.	25 March 2018	(Spain) Catalunya Master	(Argentina) Juan Cruz Belluati	4–6 / 2–6	(Argentina) Maxi Sánchez (Argentina) Sanyo Gutiérrez	
2.	12 August 2018	(Spain) Mijas Open	(Argentina) Juan Cruz Belluati	2–6 / 6–3 / 3–6	(Argentina) Maxi Sánchez (Argentina) Sanyo Gutiérrez	
2019
3.	24 March 2019	(Spain) Marbella Master	(Spain) Paquito Navarro	1–6 / 6–7	(Argentina) Maxi Sánchez (Argentina) Sanyo Gutiérrez	
4.	14 April 2019	(Spain) Logroño Open	(Spain) Paquito Navarro	6–7 / 6–7	(Argentina) Maxi Sánchez (Argentina) Sanyo Gutiérrez	
5.	28 April 2019	(Spain) Alicante Open	(Spain) Paquito Navarro	3–6 / 7–6 / 6–2	(Argentina) Fernando Belasteguín (Brazil) Pablo Lima	1st
6.	12 May 2019	(Spain) Vigo Open	(Spain) Paquito Navarro	3–6 / 4–6	(Argentina) Maxi Sánchez (Argentina) Sanyo Gutiérrez	
7.	26 May 2019	(Spain) Jaén Open	(Spain) Paquito Navarro	7–5 / 6–4	(Argentina) Maxi Sánchez (Argentina) Sanyo Gutiérrez	2nd
8.	23 June 2019	(Spain) Valladolid Master	(Spain) Paquito Navarro	6–7 / 6–4 / 6–4	(Spain) Alejandro Galán (Spain) Juani Mieres	3rd
9.	30 June 2019	(Sweden) Swedish Open	(Spain) Paquito Navarro	6–3 / 7–6	(Argentina) Franco Stupaczuk (Spain) Matías Díaz	4th
10.	17 November 2019	(Spain) Córdoba Open	(Spain) Paquito Navarro	3–6 / 3–6	(Argentina) Franco Stupaczuk (Spain) Matías Díaz	
11.	24 November 2019	(Brazil) São Paulo Open	(Spain) Paquito Navarro	2–6 / 6–3 / 6–2	(Spain) Javier Ruiz (Spain) Uri Botello	5th
12.	1 December 2019	Mexico Open	(Spain) Paquito Navarro	7–6 / 6–7 / 2–6	(Argentina) Maxi Sánchez (Argentina) Sanyo Gutiérrez	
2020
13.	8 March 2020	(Spain) Marbella Master	(Spain) Alejandro Galán	6–7 / 6–2 / 3–6	(Brazil) Pablo Lima (Spain) Paquito Navarro	
14.	5 July 2020	(Spain) Estrella Damm Open	(Spain) Alejandro Galán	7–5 / 6–3	(Brazil) Pablo Lima (Spain) Paquito Navarro	6th
15.	19 July 2020	(Spain) Vuelve a Madrid Open	(Spain) Alejandro Galán	4–6 / 6–1 / 6–4	(Argentina) Agustín Tapia (Argentina) Fernando Belasteguín	7th
16.	9 August 2020	(Spain) Adeslas Open	(Spain) Alejandro Galán	6–7 / 6–1 / 6–4	(Argentina) Federico Chingotto (Argentina) Juan Tello	8th
17.	6 September 2020	(Spain) Valencia Open	(Spain) Alejandro Galán	6–3 / 7–6	(Argentina) Federico Chingotto (Argentina) Juan Tello	9th
18.	18 October 2020	(Spain) Barcelona Master	(Spain) Alejandro Galán	6–4 / 6–1	(Argentina) Franco Stupaczuk (Argentina) Sanyo Gutiérrez	10th
19.	8 November 2020	(Spain) Alicante Open	(Spain) Alejandro Galán	4–6 / 6–3 / 6–4	(Argentina) Franco Stupaczuk (Argentina) Sanyo Gutiérrez	11th
20.	13 December 2020	(Spain) Master Final	(Spain) Alejandro Galán	3–6 / 6–7	(Argentina) Agustín Tapia (Argentina) Fernando Belasteguín	
2021
21.	25 April 2021	(Spain) Alicante Open	(Spain) Alejandro Galán	6–0 / 6–4	(Spain) Alejandro Ruiz (Argentina) Franco Stupaczuk	12th
22.	30 May 2021	(Spain) Santander Open	(Spain) Alejandro Galán	6–3 / 6–2	(Spain) Javi Rico (Spain) Momo González	13th
23.	13 June 2021	(Spain) Marbella Master	(Spain) Alejandro Galán	7–6 / 6–2	(Argentina) Agustín Tapia (Brazil) Pablo Lima	14th
24.	11 July 2021	(Spain) Valencia Open	(Spain) Alejandro Galán	5–7 / 6–3 / 4–6	(Argentina) Fernando Belasteguín (Argentina) Sanyo Gutiérrez	
25.	5 September 2021	Portugal Master	(Spain) Alejandro Galán	4–6 / 7–5 / 6–3	(Argentina) Federico Chingotto (Argentina) Juan Tello	15th
26.	26 September 2021	(Spain) Lugo Open	(Spain) Alejandro Galán	6–4 / 4–6 / 6–3	(Argentina) Martín Di Nenno (Spain) Paquito Navarro	16th
27.	10 October 2021	(Spain) Menorca Open	(Spain) Alejandro Galán	6–3 / 6–4	(Argentina) Martín Di Nenno (Spain) Paquito Navarro	17th
28.	19 December 2021	(Spain) Master Final	(Spain) Alejandro Galán	6–4 / 6–4	(Argentina) Agustín Tapia (Argentina) Sanyo Gutiérrez	18th
2022
29.	13 March 2022	(Spain) Reus Open	(Spain) Alejandro Galán	2–6 / 2–6	(Argentina) Agustín Tapia (Argentina) Sanyo Gutiérrez	
30.	27 March 2022	(Spain) Vigo Open	(Spain) Alejandro Galán	6–2 / 3–6 / 4–6	(Argentina) Agustín Tapia (Argentina) Sanyo Gutiérrez	
31.	10 April 2022	(Spain) Alicante Open	(Spain) Alejandro Galán	6–2 / 6–3	(Argentina) Martín Di Nenno (Spain) Paquito Navarro	19th
32.	8 May 2022	(Belgium) Brussels Open	(Spain) Alejandro Galán	6–3 / 6–3	(Argentina) Franco Stupaczuk (Brazil) Pablo Lima	20th
33.	5 June 2022	(Spain) Marbella Master	(Spain) Alejandro Galán	6–2 / 6–4	(Spain) Alejandro Ruiz (Spain) Momo González	21st
34.	12 June 2022	Austria Open	(Spain) Alejandro Galán	1–6 / 6–0 / 6–7	(Argentina) Agustín Tapia (Argentina) Sanyo Gutiérrez	
35.	19 June 2022	France Open	(Spain) Alejandro Galán	6–7 / 4–6	(Argentina) Franco Stupaczuk (Brazil) Pablo Lima	
36.	26 June 2022	(Spain) Valladolid Master	(Spain) Alejandro Galán	6–4 / 7–6	(Spain) Arturo Coello (Argentina) Fernando Belasteguín	22nd
37.	10 July 2022	(Spain) Valencia Open	(Spain) Alejandro Galán	6–4 / 7–6	(Argentina) Agustín Tapia (Argentina) Sanyo Gutiérrez	
38.	11 September 2022	Portugal Open	(Spain) Alejandro Galán	6–2 / 6–7 / 6–1	(Argentina) Agustín Tapia (Argentina) Sanyo Gutiérrez	23rd
39.	18 September 2022	(Sweden) Swedish Open	(Spain) Alejandro Galán	6–7 / 6–2 / 6–1	(Argentina) Martín Di Nenno (Spain) Paquito Navarro	24th
40.	23 October 2022	(Spain) Menorca Open	(Spain) Alejandro Galán	6–4 / 4–6 / 6–2	(Spain) Francisco Morales (Argentina) Ramiro Moyano	25th
41.	13 November 2022	(Sweden) Malmö Open	(Spain) Alejandro Galán	4–6 / 6–1 / 6–2	(Argentina) Agustín Tapia (Argentina) Sanyo Gutiérrez	26th
42.	20 November 2022	(Argentina) Buenos Aires Master	(Spain) Alejandro Galán	7–6 / 6–2	(Spain) Arturo Coello (Argentina) Fernando Belasteguín	27th
43.	18 December 2022	(Spain) Master Final	(Spain) Alejandro Galán	6–4 / 6–7 / 6–2	(Argentina) Federico Chingotto (Argentina) Martín Di Nenno	28th
2023
44.	26 February 2023	(United Arab Emirates) Abu Dhabi Master	(Spain) Alejandro Galán	6–7 / 3–6	(Argentina) Agustín Tapia (Spain) Arturo Coello	
45.	19 March 2023	Chile Open	(Spain) Alejandro Galán	4–6 / 7–6 / 5–7	(Argentina) Agustín Tapia (Spain) Arturo Coello	
46.	14 May 2023	(Spain) Vigo Open	(Spain) Alejandro Galán	3–6 / 7–6 / 6–7	(Argentina) Agustín Tapia (Spain) Arturo Coello	
47.	3 September 2023	Finland Open	(Spain) Alejandro Galán	6–0 / 7–6	(Spain) Coki Nieto (Spain) Jon Sanz	29th
48.	1 October 2023	Germany Open	(Spain) Alejandro Galán	6–2 / 6–2	(Argentina) Franco Stupaczuk (Argentina) Martín Di Nenno	30th
49.	29 October 2023	(Spain) Menorca Open	(Spain) Alejandro Galán	6–3 / 6–2	(Argentina) Agustín Tapia (Spain) Arturo Coello	31st
50.	12 November 2023	(Sweden) Malmö Open	(Spain) Alejandro Galán	6–3 / 6–4	(Argentina) Franco Stupaczuk (Argentina) Martín Di Nenno	32nd
51.	12 December 2023	(Spain) Masters Final	(Spain) Alejandro Galán	1–6 / 4–6	(Argentina) Federico Chingotto (Spain) Paquito Navarro	

Tournaments won	Challenger	Open	Master	Master Final	Total
Tournaments won	0	23	7	2	32

=== Premier Padel (2024–Present) ===
Winner Runner-up

==== Finals ====
N.º	Date	Tournament	Partner	Result	Opponents in the final	Career title No.
2022
52.	2 April 2022	Qatar Major	(Spain) Alejandro Galan	3–6 / 6–7	(Argentina) Martin Di Nenno (Spain) Paquito Navarro	
53.	29 May 2022	Italy Major	(Spain) Alejandro Galan	4–6 / 7–5 / 6–4	(Argentina) Martin Di Nenno (Spain) Paquito Navarro	33rd
54.	17 July 2022	(France) Paris Major	(Spain) Alejandro Galan	6–3 / 4–6 / 6–4	(Argentina) Federico Chingotto (Argentina) Juan Tello	34th
55.	7 August 2022	(Spain) Madrid P1	(Spain) Alejandro Galan	5–7 / 6–2 / 6–3	(Argentina) Martin Di Nenno (Spain) Paquito Navarro	35th
56.	30 October 2022	(Egypt) Giza P1	(Spain) Alejandro Galan	6–2 / 6–7 / 6–7	(Argentina) Franco Stupaczuk (Brazil) Pablo Lima	
57.	11 December 2022	(Italy) Milan P1	(Spain) Alejandro Galan	6–2 / 6–2	(Brazil) Lucas Bergamini (Spain) Victor Ruiz	36th
2023
58.	10 December 2023	(Italy) Milan P1	(Spain) Alejandro Galan	7–6 / 6–7 / 7–6	(Argentina) Franco Stupaczuk (Argentina) Martin Di Nenno	37th
2024
59.	2 March 2024	(Saudi Arabia) Riyadh P1	(Spain) Alejandro Galan	6–7 / 6–4 / 6–4	(Argentina) Agustín Tapia (Spain) Arturo Coello	38th
60.	2 March 2024	(Mexico) Acapulco P1	(Spain) Alejandro Galan	0–6 / 4–6	(Argentina) Agustín Tapia (Spain) Arturo Coello	
61.	4 August 2024	Finland P2	(Argentina) Martín Di Nenno	7–5 / 6–3	(Spain) Coki Nieto (Spain) Jon Sanz	39th
2025
62.	17 February 2025	(Saudi Arabia) Riyadh	(Argentina) Franco Stupaczuk	3–6 / 7–5 / 3–6	(Argentina) Agustín Tapia (Spain) Arturo Coello	
63.	16 March 2025	(Mexico) Cancún P2	(Argentina) Franco Stupaczuk	6–2 / 6–3	(Argentina) Gonzalo Alfonso (Argentina) Leonel 'Tolito' Aguirre	40th
64.	23 March 2025	(United States) Miami P1	(Argentina) Franco Stupaczuk	1–6 / 6–7	(Spain) Alejandro Galan (Argentina) Federico Chingotto	
65.	30 March 2025	(Chile) Santiago P1	(Argentina) Franco Stupaczuk	W.O.	(Spain) Alejandro Galan (Argentina) Federico Chingotto	
66.	29 June 2025	(Spain) Valladolid P2	(Argentina) Franco Stupaczuk	5–7 / 4–6	(Argentina) Agustín Tapia (Spain) Arturo Coello	
2026
67.	22 March 2026	(Mexico) Cancún P2	(Argentina) Leandro Augsburger	7–6 / 3–6 / 5–7	(Argentina) Agustín Tapia (Spain) Arturo Coello	
68.	26 April 2026	(Belgium) Brussels P2	(Argentina) Leandro Augsburger	2–6 / 6–3 / 6–3	(Argentina) Agustín Tapia (Spain) Arturo Coello	41st
69.	19 July 2026	(Spain) Málaga P1	(Argentina) Leandro Augsburger	2–6 / 2–6	(Argentina) Agustín Tapia (Spain) Arturo Coello	
70.	18 October 2026	(Italy) Milan P1	(Argentina) Leandro Augsburger	6–4 / 3–6 / 2–6	(Argentina) Agustín Tapia (Spain) Arturo Coello	
71.	15 November 2026	(United Arab Emirates) Dubai P1	(Argentina) Leandro Augsburger	7–6 / 5–7 / 6–3	(Argentina) Gonzalo Alfonso (Argentina) Valentino Libaak	42nd

Tournaments won	P2	P1	Major	PP Finals	Total
Tournaments won	3	5	2	0	10

=== World Championship ===
- 2021 World Padel Championship
- 2026 World Padel Championship

==== Other Titles ====
- 2016 World Doubles Championship - winner with Álvaro Cepero
- 2018 World Padel National Pairs Championships - winner with Alejandro Galán

== Teammates ==
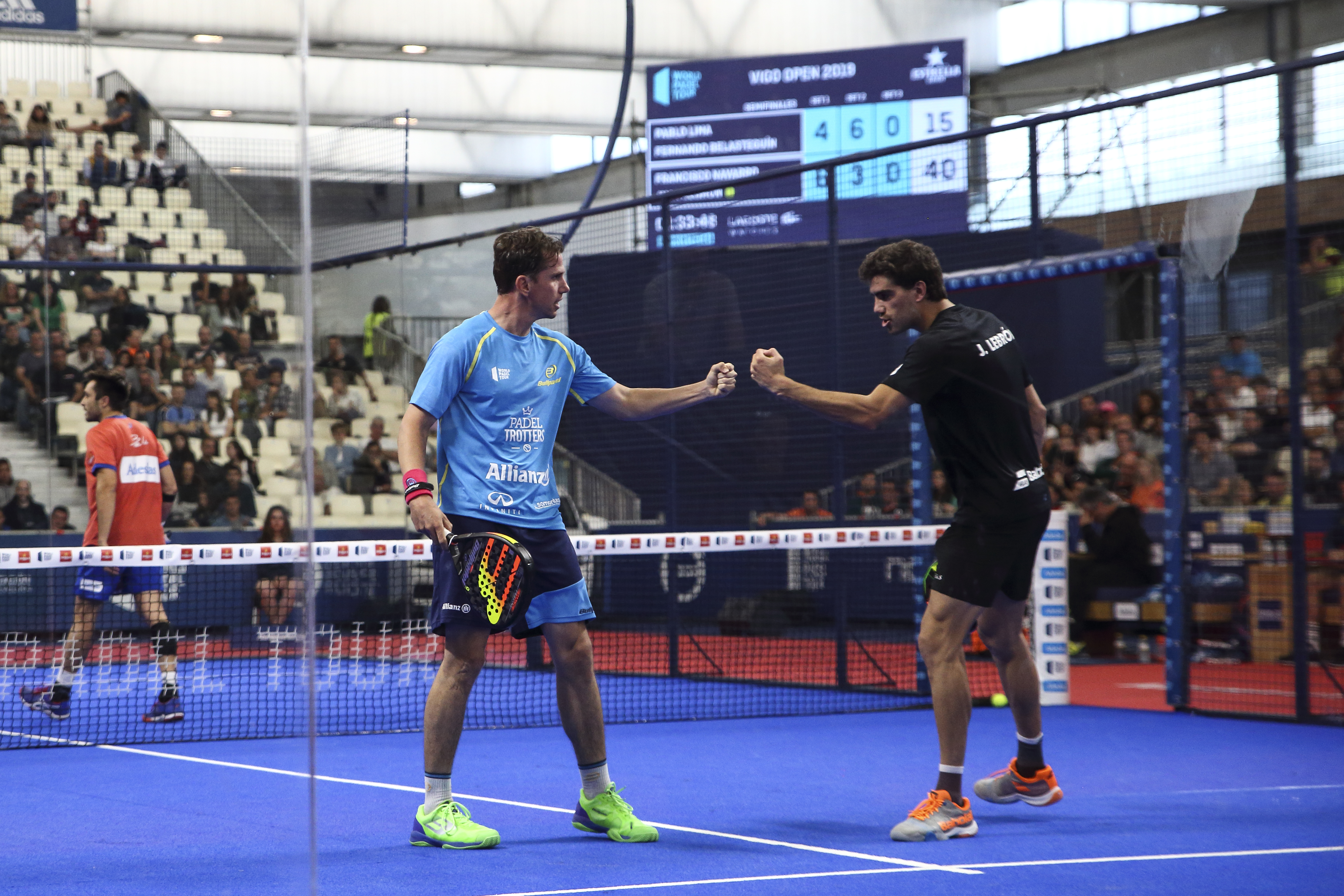
Paquito Navarro (left) with Juan Lebrón (right)

Juan Lebrón has played with 12 different teammates and has won titles with most of them.

- Gaby Reca (01/2016 – 12/2016)
- Marcello Jardim (01/2017 – 7/2017)
- Matias Marina Artuso (04/2017 – 4/2017)
- Jordi Muñoz (07/2017 – 07/2017)
- Adrian Allemandi (07/2017 – 12/2017)
- Juan Cruz Belluati (01/2018 – 10/2018)
- Juan Martin Díaz (10/2018 – 12/2018)
- Paquito Navarro (01/2019 – 12/2019, 03/2024 – 08/2024)
- Alejandro Galán (01/2020 – 03/2024)
- Martin Di Nenno (08/2024 – 12/2024)
- Franco Stupaczuk (01/2025 – 11/2025)
- Leandro Augsburger (11/2025 – current)
