= 2019 WPT São Paulo Open =

World Padel Tour tournament held in São Paulo, Brazil

- Date: 19 – 24 November
- Edition: 1st
- Category: Open
- Location: São Paulo, Brazil
- Venue: Ginásio do Morumbi

Champions
- Men's doubles: (Spain) Juan Lebrón (Spain) Paquito Navarro

Chronology

The 2019 São Paulo Open (officially 2019 World Padel Tour São Paulo Open) was the sixteenth tournament of the seventh season organized by World Padel Tour, the most prestigious padel circuit at the time, and the first tournament organized by the a main padel circuit on Brazilian soil.

For the second time this season, the tournament did not feature a women's draw.

In the men's category, the early elimination of Maxi Sánchez and Sanyo Gutiérrez opened the door for two players to potentially rise to the number 1 spot in the world rankings. One of the players who had the opportunity was Alejandro Galán, who if he won the tournament alongside Pablo Lima, and if Lebrón didn't reach the final, would become the new leader of the ranking. However, Galán and Lima were eliminated in the semifinals by Javi Ruiz and Uri Botello, who reached their second career final. The other player with the possibility of becoming the new leader of the rankings was Juan Lebrón, who by reaching the final alongside Paquito Navarro, became the new undisputed number 1 in the world. In the final, Lebrón and Paquito defeated Botello and Ruiz, winning their fifth title of the season, becoming the most titled men's team on the circuit with five titles and also becoming the new first ranked pair. With the victory, Lebrón and Paquito also became the first pair to win a title on Brazilian soil.

History was also made in this event, with, for the first time ever, the three best players in the world ranking being born in Spain: Juan Lebrón (1st with 10,730 points), Paquito Navarro (2nd with 10,495) and Alejandro Galán (3rd with 9,500).

== Head-to-head record between teams ranked in the top 4 during the season ==
=== Men's ===
Record	Maxi–Sanyo	Lebrón–Paquito	Galán–Lima	Belasteguín–Tapia	Former Pairs	Díaz–Stupaczuk	Belasteguín–Lima	Galán–J. Mieres	Lamperti–Mieres
Maxi–Sanyo	—	3–1	—	1–1		3–0	—	1–1	—
Lebrón–Paquito	1–3	—	0–2	2–2		2–3	5–0	2–0	—
Galán–Lima	—	2–0	—	1–0		1–1	—	—	—
Belasteguín–Tapia	1–1	2–2	0–1	—		1–0	—	—	—
Former Pairs
Díaz–Stupaczuk	0–3	3–2	1–1	0–1		—	0–1	2–0	—
Belasteguín–Lima	—	0–5	—	—		1–0	—	0–1	—
Galán–J. Mieres	1–1	0–2	—	—		0–2	1–0	—	—
Lamperti–Mieres	—	—	—	—		—	—	—	—

== Draws ==
=== Men's Bracket ===
Round of 32
1	(Argentina) Maxi / (Argentina) Sanyo
Bye
Q	(Spain) J. Barahona / (Spain) Momo	6	2	6
(Spain) Á. Cepero / (Spain) P. Lijó	3	6	7
(Spain) J. Rico / (Spain) V. Ruiz	4	3
(Spain) A. Blanco / (Spain) J. Martinez	6	6
(Spain) A. Ruiz / (Spain) M. Piñeiro	1	0
6	(Spain) J. Ruiz / (Spain) U. Botello	6	6
5	(Argentina) F. Stupaczuk / (Spain) M. Díaz	6	6
(Spain) J. Mieres / (Brazil) M. Jardim	4	0
Q	(Argentina) Godo Díaz / (Argentina) M. Marina	6	3	4
(Brazil) L. Campagnolo / (Argentina) L. Capra	4	6	6
(Spain) A. Santana / (Brazil) L. Bergamini	3	7	6
(Argentina) M. Grabiel / (Argentina) M. Lamperti	6	6	4
Bye
3	(Spain) Galán / (Brazil) Lima
4	(Argentina) Belasteguín / (Argentina) Tapia
Bye
Q	(Spain) A. Sans / (Spain) I. Zaratiegui	4	3
(Spain) G. Rubio / (Spain) E. Moreno	6	6
(Spain) N. Gadea / (Argentina) S. Nerone	4	7	3
WC	(Brazil) J. Julianoti / (Brazil) S. Flores	6	5	0
(Argentina) J.G. Diestro / (Argentina) J. Restivo	1	3
7	(Argentina) F. Chingotto / (Argentina) J. Tello	6	6
8	(Argentina) A. Allemandi / (Argentina) A. Silingo	4	2
(Argentina) Di Nenno / (Spain) J. Garrido	6	6
WC	(Brazil) F. Gomes / M. Simonato	3	2
(Argentina) J.C. Belluati / (Argentina) R. Moyano	6	6
(Spain) Coki / (Spain) J. Rico	6	6
Q	(Argentina) A. Gutiérrez / (Chile) J. Valdes	4	2
Bye
2	(Spain) Lebrón / (Spain) Paquito

Round of 16
1	(Argentina) Maxi / (Argentina) Sanyo	4	6	2
(Spain) Á. Cepero / (Spain) P. Lijó	6	3	6
(Spain) A. Blanco / (Spain) J. Martinez	2	6	2
6	(Spain) J. Ruiz / (Spain) U. Botello	6	4	6
5	(Argentina) F. Stupaczuk / (Spain) M. Díaz	6	6
(Brazil) L. Campagnolo / (Argentina) L. Capra	2	4
(Spain) A. Santana / (Brazil) L. Bergamini	4	5
3	(Spain) Galán / (Brazil) Lima	6	7
4	(Argentina) Belasteguín / (Argentina) Tapia	7	6
(Spain) G. Rubio / (Spain) E. Moreno	5	1
(Spain) N. Gadea / (Argentina) S. Nerone	6	6	6
7	(Argentina) F. Chingotto / (Argentina) J. Tello	7	1	7
(Argentina) Di Nenno / (Spain) J. Garrido	7	6	6
(Argentina) J.C. Belluati / (Argentina) R. Moyano	6	7	4
(Spain) Coki / (Spain) J. Rico	3	6
2	(Spain) Lebrón / (Spain) Paquito	6	7

Quarter-Final
(Spain) Á. Cepero / (Spain) P. Lijó	6	4	2
6	(Spain) J. Ruiz / (Spain) U. Botello	2	6	6
5	(Argentina) F. Stupaczuk / (Spain) M. Díaz	4	2
3	(Spain) Galán / (Brazil) Lima	6	3	*
4	(Argentina) Belasteguín / (Argentina) Tapia	6	5	6
7	(Argentina) F. Chingotto / (Argentina) J. Tello	3	7	1
(Argentina) Di Nenno / (Spain) J. Garrido	2	2
2	(Spain) Lebrón / (Spain) Paquito	6	6

Semi-Finals
6	(Spain) J. Ruiz / (Spain) U. Botello	3	7	6
3	(Spain) Galán / (Brazil) Lima	6	6	3
4	(Argentina) Belasteguín / (Argentina) Tapia	7	6	4
2	(Spain) Lebrón / (Spain) Paquito	6	7	6

Finals
6	(Spain) J. Ruiz / (Spain) U. Botello	6	3	2
2	(Spain) Lebrón / (Spain) Paquito	2	6	6

== Results ==
=== Round of 32 ===
Date	Winners	Score	Opponent	Refs.
20/11/2019	(Spain) Álvaro Cepero (Spain) Pablo Lijó	3–6 / 6–2 / 7–6	(Spain) Javier Barahona (Spain) Momo González	
20/11/2019	(Spain) Adrián Blanco (Spain) Javier Martinez Vazquez	6–4 / 6–3	(Spain) José Rico (Spain) Víctor Ruiz	
20/11/2019	(Spain) Javi Ruiz (Spain) Uri Botello	6–1 / 6–0	(Spain) Alejandro Ruiz (Spain) Martin Sánchez Piñeiro	
20/11/2019	(Argentina) Franco Stupaczuk (Spain) Matías Díaz	6–4 / 6–0	(Spain) Juani Mieres (Brazil) Marcello Jardim	
20/11/2019	(Argentina) Godo Díaz (Spain) Matías Marina Artusa	4–6 / 6–3 / 6–4	(Brazil) Lucas Campagnolo (Argentina) Lucho Capra	
20/11/2019	(Spain) Aday Santana (Brazil) Lucas Bergamini	3–6 / 7–6 / 6–4	(Argentina) Maxi Grabiel (Argentina) Miguel Lamperti	
20/11/2019	(Spain) Gonzalo Rubio (Spain) Ernesto Moreno	6–4 / 6–3	(Spain) Anton Sans (Spain) Iñigo Zaratiegui	
20/11/2019	(Spain) Nacho Gadea (Argentina) Sebastián Nerone	4–6 / 7–5 / 3–0 / W.O.	(Brazil) Julio Julianoti (Brazil) Stefano Flores	
20/11/2019	(Argentina) Federico Chingotto (Argentina) Juan Tello	6–1 / 6–3	(Spain) José García Diestro (Argentina) Juan Manuel Restivo	
20/11/2019	(Spain) Javi Garrido (Argentina) Martín Di Nenno	6–4 / 6–2	(Argentina) Agustin Goméz Silingo (Argentina) Adrián Allemandi	
20/11/2019	(Argentina) Juan Cruz Belluati (Argentina) Ramiro Moyano	6–3 / 6–2	(Brazil) Francisco Gomes (Brazil) Matheus Simonato	
20/11/2019	(Spain) Coki Nieto (Spain) Javi Rico	6–4 / 6–2	(Argentina) Agustín Gutiérrez (Chile) Javier Valdes	

=== Round of 16 ===
Date	Winners	Score	Opponent	Refs.
21/11/2019	(Spain) Álvaro Cepero (Spain) Pablo Lijó	6–4 / 3–6 / 6–2	(Argentina) Maxi Sánchez (Argentina) Sanyo Gutiérrez	
21/11/2019	(Spain) Javi Ruiz (Spain) Uri Botello	6–2 / 4–6 / 6–2	(Spain) Adrián Blanco (Spain) Javier Martinez Vazquez	
21/11/2019	(Argentina) Franco Stupaczuk (Spain) Matías Díaz	6–2 / 6–4	(Argentina) Godo Díaz (Spain) Matías Marina Artusa	
21/11/2019	(Spain) Alejandro Galán (Brazil) Pablo Lima	6–4 / 7–5	(Spain) Aday Santana (Brazil) Lucas Bergamini	
21/11/2019	(Argentina) Agustín Tapia (Argentina) Fernando Belasteguín	7–5 / 6–1	(Spain) Gonzalo Rubio (Spain) Ernesto Moreno	
21/11/2019	(Argentina) Federico Chingotto (Argentina) Juan Tello	7–6 / 1–6 / 7–6	(Spain) Nacho Gadea (Argentina) Sebastián Nerone	
21/11/2019	(Spain) Javi Garrido (Argentina) Martín Di Nenno	7–6 / 6–7 / 6–4	(Argentina) Juan Cruz Belluati (Argentina) Ramiro Moyano	
21/11/2019	(Spain) Juan Lebrón (Spain) Paquito Navarro	6–3 / 7–6	(Spain) Coki Nieto (Spain) Javi Rico	

=== Quarter-Finals ===
Date	Winners	Score	Opponent	Refs.
22/11/2019	(Spain) Javi Ruiz (Spain) Uri Botello	2–6 / 6–4 / 6–2	(Spain) Álvaro Cepero (Spain) Pablo Lijó	
22/11/2019	(Spain) Alejandro Galán (Brazil) Pablo Lima	6–4 / 3–2 / W.O.	(Argentina) Franco Stupaczuk (Spain) Matías Díaz	
22/11/2019	(Argentina) Agustín Tapia (Argentina) Fernando Belasteguín	6–3 / 5–7 / 6–1	(Argentina) Federico Chingotto (Argentina) Juan Tello	
22/11/2019	(Spain) Juan Lebrón (Spain) Paquito Navarro	6–2 / 6–2	(Spain) Javi Garrido (Argentina) Martín Di Nenno	

=== Semi-Finals ===
Date	Winners	Score	Opponent	Refs.
23/11/2019	(Spain) Javi Ruiz (Spain) Uri Botello	3–6 / 7–6 / 6–3	(Spain) Alejandro Galán (Brazil) Pablo Lima	
23/11/2019	(Spain) Juan Lebrón (Spain) Paquito Navarro	6–7 / 7–6 / 6–4	(Argentina) Agustín Tapia (Argentina) Fernando Belasteguín	

=== Finals ===
Date	Winners	Score	Opponent	Refs.
24/11/2019	(Spain) Juan Lebrón (Spain) Paquito Navarro	2–6 / 6–3 / 6–2	(Spain) Javi Ruiz (Spain) Uri Botello	
