= 2024 Finland P2 =

Padel championships

- Date: 28 July – 4 August
- Edition: 1st
- Category: P2
- Prize money: €250.000
- Location: Nokia, Finland
- Venue: Padelone Arena

Champions
- Men's doubles: (Spain) Juan Lebrón (Argentina) Martin Di Nenno
- Women's doubles: (Spain) Ariana Sánchez (Spain) Paula Josemaría

Chronology

The 2024 Finland P2 (officially 2024 Finland Premier Padel P2) was the fourteenth tournament of the third season organized by Premier Padel, promoted by the International Padel Federation, and with the financial backing of Nasser Al-Khelaïfi's Qatar Sports Investments, now serving as the premier padel circuit.

In the women's category, the two top-seeded pairs faced off in the finals, with Marta Ortega and Sofia Araújo reaching the final in their third tournament together, where they were defeated by Ariana Sánchez and Paula Josemaría, who claimed their sixth title of 2024.

In the men's category, the number-one seeded Juan Lebrón and Martin Di Nenno confirmed their status as favorites by reaching the final and defeating Coki Nieto and Jon Sanz in two sets.

== Relevant Data ==
=== Top ranked not competing once again ===
Coello/Tapia and Galán-Chingotto, the circuit's two highest-ranked pairs, opted not to compete in this tournament, thereby making Lebrón/Di Nenno and Stupaczuk/Yanguas the number one and number two seeds, respectively.

Similar to the men's draw, the second and third ranked pairs in the women's division, B. González/D. Brea and Fernández/Triay, also did not participate in the competition, making Ortega/Araújo the second seeds.

=== New winners and a historic title ===
With both number-one pairs tournament wins, Lebrón and Di Nenno claimed their first title as a team, Lebrón's 39th, while Ariana and Paula secured their 33rd, becoming the most successful women's pair in the history of padel.

== Seeds ==
Male

Rnk.	Team	FIP Ranking Points
1	(Spain) Juan Lebrón (Argentina) Martin Di Nenno	18299
2	(Argentina) Franco Stupaczuk (Spain) Miguel Yanguas	12721
3	(Spain) Pablo Cardona (Spain) Paquito Navarro	9291
4	(Argentina) Fernando Belasteguín (Argentina) Juan Tello	8276
5	(Spain) Aléx Ruiz (Spain) Javi Garrido	7995
6	(Spain) Coki Nieto (Spain) Jon Sanz	6749
7	(Spain) Eduardo Alonso (Spain) Momo Gonzalez	6428
8	(Spain) Alejandro Arroyo (Argentina) Sanyo Gutiérrez	6288
9	(Argentina) Lucho Capra (Argentina) Maxi Sanchéz	4821
10	(Brazil) Lucas Bergamini (Spain) Victor Ruiz	4740
11	(Spain) Javier Leal (Brazil) Lucas Campagnolo	3735
12	(Spain) Javier Rico (Spain) Juanlu Esbri	3290
13	(Spain) Javi Ruiz (Spain) Jose Garcia Diestro	2942
14	(Spain) Gonzalo Rubio (Spain) Pablo Lijó	2723
15	(Spain) Javier Barahona (Spain) Teodoro Zapata	2593
16	(Spain) Francisco Guerrero (Spain) Jairo Bautista	2424

Female

Rnk.	Team	FIP Ranking Points
1	(Spain) Ariana Sanchez (Spain) Paula Josemaria	28488
2	(Spain) Marta Ortega (Portugal) Sofia Araújo	11651
3	(Argentina) Claudia Jensen (Spain) Jessica Castello	10147
4	(Spain) Lucia Sainz (Spain) Patty Llaguno	9786
5	(Spain) Alejandra Salazar (Spain) Veronica Virseda	8819
6	(Spain) Carmen Goenaga (Argentina) Virginia Riera	6074
7	(Spain) Alejandra Alonso (Spain) Andrea Ustero	4393
8	(Spain) Marina Guinart (Spain) Nuria Rodriguez	3610
9	(Spain) Beatriz Caldera (Spain) Lorena Rufo	3408
10	(Russia) Ksenia Sharifova (Spain) Lucia Martinez	3319
11	(Portugal) Ana Catarina Nogueira (Spain) Marta Talavan	2828
12	(France) Alix Collombon (Argentina) Julieta Bidahorria	2509
13	(Spain) Noa Canovas (Spain) Sara Ruiz	2466
14	(Spain) Marina Lobo (Spain) Sofia Saiz	2153
15	(Sweden) Carolina Navarro (Spain) Maria Rodriguez Abajo	2100
16	(Spain) Marta Borrero (Spain) Sandra Bellver	1833

== Head-to-head record between teams ranked in the top 4 during the season ==
=== Man's ===
Record	Coello–Tapia	Galán–Chingotto	Lebrón–Di Nenno	Stupaczuk–Yanguas	Former Pairs	Galán–Lebrón	Paquito–Sanyo	Lebrón–Paquito	Di Nenno–Stupaczuk
Coello–Tapia	—	4–5	—	—		1–1	2–0	4–0	1–0
Galán–Chingotto	5–4	—	—	—		—	—	1–0	7–0
Lebrón–Di Nenno	—	—	—	—		—	—	—	—
Stupaczuk–Yanguas	—	—	—	—		—	—	—	—
Former Pairs									
Galán–Lebrón	1–1	—	—	—		—	—	—	2–0
Paquito–Sanyo	0–2	—	—	—		—	—	—	—
Lebrón–Paquito	0–4	0–1	—	—		—	—	—	0–1
Di Nenno–Stupaczuk	0–1	0–7	—	—		0–2	—	1–0	—

=== Women's ===
Record	Ariana–Paula	Gonzalez–D. Brea	Fernandez–Triay	Araújo–Ortega	Former Pairs	Icardo–Salazar	Ortega–Triay	Ortega–Virseda
Ariana–Paula	—	2–1	4–3	1–1		1–0	—	1–0
B. Gonzalez–D. Brea	1–2	—	3–1	—		3–0	—	—
Fernandez–Triay	3–4	1–3	—	—		0–1	—	1–0
Araújo–Ortega	1–1	—	—	—		—	—	—
Former Pairs								
Icardo–Salazar	0–1	0–3	1–0	—		—	—	—
Ortega–Triay	—	—	—	—		—	—	—
Ortega–Virseda	0–1	—	0–1	—		—	—	—

== Draws ==
=== Men's Bracket ===
Round of 32
1	(Argentina) Di Nenno / (Spain) Lebrón	7	6
12	(Spain) J. Rico / (Spain) J. Esbri	5	0
10	(Brazil) L. Bergamini / (Spain) V. Ruiz	4	2
11	(Spain) J. Leal / (Brazil) L. Campagnolo	6	6
14	(Spain) G. Rubio / (Spain) P. Lijó	4	5
18	(Argentina) A. Chozas / (Argentina) V. Libaak	6	7
25	(Italy) Aris Patiniotis / (Argentina) C.G. Gutierrez	4	1
5	(Spain) A. Ruiz / (Spain) J. Garrido	6	6
7	(Spain) E. Alonso / (Spain) Momo	6	6
LL	(Spain) I. Vilariño / (Spain) P.G. Rodrigo	4	0
22	(Spain) J.J. Casas / (Spain) P. Fernandez	6	6	6
Q	(Argentina) F. Mouriño / (Spain) J. Moya	7	3	4
WC	(Argentina) J.P. Andrada / (Finland) M. Sjovall	2	1
Q	(Spain) I. Jofre / (Spain) L.H. Quesada	6	6
24	(Spain) E. Chamero / (Chile) J. Valdes	4	6	6
4	(Argentina) Belasteguin / (Argentina) J. Tello	6	4	4
3	(Spain) P. Cardona / (Spain) Paquito	6	6
Q	(Spain) J. Marmolejo / (Spain) V. Mena Gil	4	2
26	(Spain) J.D. Sanchez / (Spain) M. Del Castillo	2	6	5
20	(Italy) D. Perino / (Argentina) M. Lamperti	6	2	7
19	(Spain) J. Munoz / (Spain) J.G. Mora	6	6	7
21	(Spain) A. Cepero / (Spain) M. Benitez	4	7	6
16	(Spain) F. Guerrero / (Spain) J. Bautista	6	6	6
8	(Spain) A. Arroyo / (Argentina) Sanyo	7	3	7
6	(Spain) Coki / (Spain) J. Sanz	7	6
Q	(Spain) G. Losada / (Spain) J. Martinez	5	1
17	(Spain) I. Sager / (Spain) S. Oria	7	6	7
23	(Italy) F. Dominguez / (Sweden) D. Windahl	5	7	2
WC	(Finland) P. Hyrkkönen / (Finland) S. Huttunen	3	3
15	(Spain) J. Barahona / (Spain) T. Zapata	6	6
9	(Argentina) L. Capra / (Argentina) Maxi	5	2
2	(Argentina) Stupaczuk / (Spain) Yanguas	7	6

Round of 16
1	(Argentina) Di Nenno / (Spain) Lebrón	6	5	6
11	(Spain) J. Leal / (Brazil) L. Campagnolo	4	7	2
18	(Argentina) A. Chozas / (Argentina) V. Libaak	7	7
5	(Spain) A. Ruiz / (Spain) J. Garrido	6	6
7	(Spain) E. Alonso / (Spain) Momo	7	6
22	(Spain) J.J. Casas / (Spain) P. Fernandez	5	1
Q	(Spain) I. Jofre / (Spain) L.H. Quesada	6	7
24	(Spain) E. Chamero / (Chile) J. Valdes	4	5
3	(Spain) P. Cardona / (Spain) Paquito	6	6
20	(Italy) D. Perino / (Argentina) M. Lamperti	2	4
19	(Spain) J. Munoz / (Spain) J.G. Mora	3	6
8	(Spain) A. Arroyo / (Argentina) Sanyo	6	7
6	(Spain) Coki / (Spain) J. Sanz	6	6	6
17	(Spain) J. Barahona / (Spain) T. Zapata	7	1	4
15	(Spain) J. Barahona / (Spain) T. Zapata	3	5
2	(Argentina) Stupaczuk / (Spain) Yanguas	6	7

Quarter-Final
1	(Argentina) Di Nenno / (Spain) Lebrón	6	7
18	(Argentina) A. Chozas / (Argentina) V. Libaak	1	6
7	(Spain) E. Alonso / (Spain) Momo	6	6
24	(Spain) E. Chamero / (Chile) J. Valdes	4	2
3	(Spain) P. Cardona / (Spain) Paquito	7	7
8	(Spain) A. Arroyo / (Argentina) Sanyo	5	6
6	(Spain) Coki / (Spain) J. Sanz	6	7
2	(Argentina) Stupaczuk / (Spain) Yanguas	4	6

Semi-Finals
1	(Argentina) Di Nenno / (Spain) Lebrón	6	6
7	(Spain) E. Alonso / (Spain) Momo	4	3
3	(Spain) P. Cardona / (Spain) Paquito	6	6	6
6	(Spain) Coki / (Spain) J. Sanz	7	3	7

Finals
1	(Argentina) Di Nenno / (Spain) Lebrón	7	6
6	(Spain) Coki / (Spain) J. Sanz	5	3

=== Women's Bracket ===
Round of 32
1	(Spain) A. Sanchez / (Spain) P. Josemaria
Bye
Q	(Spain) M. Goyeneche / (Spain) M. Rivas	6	6
WC	(Finland) E. Sillanpää / (Finland) S. Saarteinen	3	0
20	(Spain) J. Bautista / (Spain) L. Arruabarrena	6	3	6
15	(Sweden) C. Navarro / (Spain) M.R. Abajo	1	6	3
10	(Russia) K. Sharifova / (Spain) L. Martinez	3	4
6	(Spain) C. Goenaga / (Argentina) V. Riera	6	6
7	(Spain) A. Alonso / (Spain) A. Ustero	6	6
Q	(Spain) L. Exposito / (Portugal) P. Ribeiro	3	2
16	(Spain) M. Borrero / (Spain) S. Bellver	3	7	6
19	(Italy) C. Casali / (Italy) L. Vano	6	6	3
12	(France) A. Collombon / (Argentina) J. Bidahorria	6	6
17	(Spain) A. Perez / (Spain) B. Las Heras	4	4
Bye
3	(Argentina) C. Jensen / (Spain) J. Castello
4	(Spain) L. Sainz / (Spain) P. Llaguno
Bye
11	(Portugal) A. Nogueira / (Spain) M. Talavan	3	2
9	(Spain) B. Caldera / (Spain) L. Rufo	6	6
14	(Spain) M. Lobo / (Spain) S. Saiz	5	*
Q	(Spain) J. Cabruja / (Spain) L. Manquillo	2
21	(Brazil) M. Schuck / (Spain) S. Pujals	1	2
5	(Spain) A. Salazar / (Spain) V. Virseda	6	6
8	(Spain) M. Guinart / (Spain) N. Rodriguez	6	6
23	(Spain) C. Castillon / (Brazil) R. Piltcher	2	2
22	(Spain) M. Goyeneche / (Spain) R. Barrera	6	6
Q	(Spain) A. Gallardo / (Spain) A. Rojo	1	1
18	(Italy) G. Marchetti / (France) L. Godallier	6	7
13	(Spain) N. Canovas / (Spain) S. Ruiz	1	6
Bye
2	(Spain) M. Ortega / (Portugal) S. Araújo

Round of 16
1	(Spain) A. Sanchez / (Spain) P. Josemaria	6	6
Q	(Spain) M. Goyeneche / (Spain) M. Rivas	2	3
20	(Spain) J. Bautista / (Spain) L. Arruabarrena	6	2
6	(Spain) C. Goenaga / (Argentina) V. Riera	7	6
7	(Spain) A. Alonso / (Spain) A. Ustero	6	6
16	(Spain) M. Borrero / (Spain) S. Bellver	1	2
12	(France) A. Collombon / (Argentina) J. Bidahorria	0	1
3	(Argentina) C. Jensen / (Spain) J. Castello	6	6
4	(Spain) L. Sainz / (Spain) P. Llaguno	6	6
9	(Spain) B. Caldera / (Spain) L. Rufo	0	1
14	(Spain) M. Lobo / (Spain) S. Saiz	5	1
5	(Spain) A. Salazar / (Spain) V. Virseda	7	6
8	(Spain) M. Guinart / (Spain) N. Rodriguez	7	6
22	(Spain) M. Goyeneche / (Spain) R. Barrera	6	2
18	(Italy) G. Marchetti / (France) L. Godallier	2	3
2	(Spain) M. Ortega / (Portugal) S. Araújo	6	6

Quarter-Final
1	(Spain) A. Sanchez / (Spain) P. Josemaria	6	6
6	(Spain) C. Goenaga / (Argentina) V. Riera	2	0
7	(Spain) A. Alonso / (Spain) A. Ustero	7	6
3	(Argentina) C. Jensen / (Spain) J. Castello	5	3
4	(Spain) L. Sainz / (Spain) P. Llaguno	6	0
5	(Spain) A. Salazar / (Spain) V. Virseda	7	6
8	(Spain) M. Guinart / (Spain) N. Rodriguez	1	2
2	(Spain) M. Ortega / (Portugal) S. Araújo	6	6

Semi-Finals
1	(Spain) A. Sanchez / (Spain) P. Josemaria	6	6
7	(Spain) A. Alonso / (Spain) A. Ustero	4	1
5	(Spain) A. Salazar / (Spain) V. Virseda	3	6
2	(Spain) M. Ortega / (Portugal) S. Araújo	6	7

Finals
1	(Spain) A. Sanchez / (Spain) P. Josemaria	6	6
2	(Spain) M. Ortega / (Portugal) S. Araújo	3	1

== Results ==
=== Round of 32 ===
Men's

Date	Winners	Score	Opponent	Refs.
30/7/2024	(Spain) Juan Lebrón (Argentina) Martin Di Nenno	7–5 / 6–0	(Spain) Javier Rico (Spain) Juanlu Esbri	
30/7/2024	(Spain) Javier Leal (Brazil) Lucas Campagnolo	6–4 / 6–2	(Brazil) Lucas Bergamini (Spain) Víctor Ruiz	
30/7/2024	(Argentina) Alex Chozas (Argentina) Valentino Libaak	6–4 / 7–5	(Spain) Gonzalo Rubio (Spain) Pablo Lijó	
30/7/2024	(Spain) Alex Ruiz (Spain) Javi Garrido	6–4 / 6–1	(Italy) Aris Patiniotis (Argentina) Cristian German Gutiérrez	
31/7/2024	(Spain) Eduardo Alonso (Spain) Momo Gonzalez	6–4 / 6–0	(Spain) Ignacio Vilariño (Spain) Pablo García Rodrigo	
30/7/2024	(Spain) José Jimenez Casas (Spain) Pincho Fernandez	6–7 / 6–3 / 6–4	(Argentina) Federico Mouriño (Spain) Jesus Moya	
31/7/2024	(Spain) Inigo Jofre (Spain) Luis Hernandez Quesada	6–2 / 6–1	(Argentina) Juan Pablo Andrada (Finland) Max Sjovall	
31/7/2024	(Spain) Emilio Sanchez Chamero (Chile) Javier Valdes	4–6 / 6–4 / 6–4	(Argentina) Fernando Belasteguín (Argentina) Juan Tello	
31/7/2024	(Spain) Pablo Cardona (Spain) Paquito Navarro	6–4 / 6–2	(Spain) José Solano Marmolejo (Spain) Victor Mena Gil	
30/7/2024	(Argentina) Juan Cruz Belluati (Argentina) Miguel Lamperti	6–2 / 2–6 / 7–5	(Spain) Jose Sanchez Serrano (Spain) Mario Del Castillo	
30/7/2024	(Spain) Javier García Mora (Spain) Jaime Muñoz	6–4 / 6–7 / 7–6	(Spain) Alvero Cepero (Spain) Miguel Benítez	
30/7/2024	(Spain) Alejandro Arroyo (Argentina) Sanyo Gutiérrez	7–6 / 3–6 / 7–6	(Spain) Francisco Guerrero (Spain) Jairo Bautista	
31/7/2024	(Spain) Coki Nieto (Spain) Jon Sanz	7–5 / 6–1	(Spain) Guillermo Collado (Spain) Javi Martinez Vazquez	
30/7/2024	(Spain) Ignacio Sager (Spain) Salvador Oria	7–5 / 6–7 / 6–2	(Sweden) Daniel Windahl (Italy) Facundo Dominguez	
30/7/2024	(Spain) Javier Gonzalez Barahona (Spain) Teodoro Zapata	6–3 / 6–3	(Finland) Pyry Hyrkkonen (Finland) Saska Huttunen	
30/7/2024	(Argentina) Franco Stupaczuk (Spain) Mike Yanguas	7–5 / 6–2	(Argentina) Lucho Capra (Argentina) Maxi Sánchez	

Women's

Date	Winners	Score	Opponent	Refs.
30/7/2024	(Spain) Camila Fassio Goyeneche (Spain) Mónica Gomez Rivas	6–3 / 6–0	(Finland) Ella Sillanpaa (Finland) Saana Saarteinen	
31/7/2024	(Spain) Julia Polo Bautista (Spain) Lara Arruabarrena	6–1 / 3–6 / 6–3	(Sweden) Carolina Navarro Björk (Spain) Laia Rodriguez Abajo	
31/7/2024	(Spain) Carmen Goenaga (Argentina) Virginia Riera	6–3 / 6–4	(Russia) Ksenia Sharifova (Spain) Lucía Martínez Gomez	
31/7/2024	(Spain) Alejandra Alonso (Spain) Andrea Ustero	6–3 / 6–2	(Spain) Lucía Peralta (Portugal) Patricia Ribeiro	
31/7/2024	(Spain) Marta Borrero (Spain) Sandra Bellver	3–6 / 7–6 / 6–3	(Italy) Carlotta Casali (Italy) Lorena Vano	
31/7/2024	(France) Alix Collombon (Argentina) Julieta Bidahorria	6–4 / 6–4	(Spain) Agueda Perez (Spain) Barbara Las Heras	
31/7/2024	(Spain) Beatriz Caldera (Spain) Lorena Rufo	6–3 / 6–2	(Portugal) Ana Catarina Nogueira (Spain) Marta Talavan	
31/7/2024	(Spain) Marina Martinez Lobo (Spain) Sofía Saiz	5–2 / W.O.	(Spain) Jana Montes Cabruja (Spain) Letizia Manquillo	
31/7/2024	(Spain) Alejandra Salazar (Spain) Verónica Virseda	6–1 / 6–2	(Brazil) Manuela Schuck (Spain) Sara Pujals	
31/7/2024	(Spain) Marina Guinart (Spain) Nuria Rodriguez	6–2 / 6–2	(Spain) Carmen Castillon (Brazil) Raquel Piltcher	
31/7/2024	(Spain) Martina Fassio Goyeneche (Spain) Raquel Eugenio Barrera	6–1 / 6–1	(Spain) Alba Gallardo Salvado (Spain) Alicia Blanco Rojo	
31/7/2024	(Italy) Giorgia Marchetti (France) Lea Godallier	6–1 / 7–6	(Spain) Noa Canovas (Spain) Sara Ruiz	

=== Round of 16 ===
Men's

Date	Winners	Score	Opponent	Refs.
1/8/2024	(Spain) Juan Lebrón (Argentina) Martin Di Nenno	6–4 / 5–7 / 6–2	(Spain) Javier Leal (Brazil) Lucas Campagnolo	
1/8/2024	(Argentina) Alex Chozas (Argentina) Valentino Libaak	7–6 / 7–6	(Spain) Alex Ruiz (Spain) Javi Garrido	
1/8/2024	(Spain) Eduardo Alonso (Spain) Momo Gonzalez	7–5 / 6–1	(Spain) José Jimenez Casas (Spain) Pincho Fernandez	
1/8/2024	(Spain) Inigo Jofre (Spain) Luis Hernandez Quesada	6–4 / 7–5	(Spain) Emilio Sanchez Chamero (Chile) Javier Valdes	
1/8/2024	(Spain) Pablo Cardona (Spain) Paquito Navarro	6–2 / 6–4	(Argentina) Juan Cruz Belluati (Argentina) Miguel Lamperti	
1/8/2024	(Spain) Alejandro Arroyo (Argentina) Sanyo Gutiérrez	6–3 / 7–6	(Spain) Javier García Mora (Spain) Jaime Muñoz	
1/8/2024	(Spain) Coki Nieto (Spain) Jon Sanz	6–7 / 6–1 / 6–4	(Spain) Ignacio Sager (Spain) Salvador Oria	
1/8/2024	(Argentina) Franco Stupaczuk (Spain) Mike Yanguas	6–3 / 7–5	(Spain) Javier Gonzalez Barahona (Spain) Teodoro Zapata	

Women's

Date	Winners	Score	Opponent	Refs.
1/8/2024	(Spain) Ariana Sánchez (Spain) Paula Josemaria	6–2 / 6–3	(Spain) Camila Fassio Goyeneche (Spain) Mónica Gomez Rivas	
1/8/2024	(Spain) Carmen Goenaga (Argentina) Virginia Riera	7–6 / 6–2	(Spain) Julia Polo Bautista (Spain) Lara Arruabarrena	
1/8/2024	(Spain) Alejandra Alonso (Spain) Andrea Ustero	6–1 / 6–2	(Spain) Marta Borrero (Spain) Sandra Bellver	
1/8/2024	(Argentina) Claudia Jensen (Spain) Jessica Castelló	6–0 / 6–1	(France) Alix Collombon (Argentina) Julieta Bidahorria	
1/8/2024	(Spain) Lucia Sainz (Spain) Patricia Llaguno	6–0 / 6–1	(Spain) Beatriz Caldera (Spain) Lorena Rufo	
1/8/2024	(Spain) Alejandra Salazar (Spain) Verónica Virseda	7–5 / 6–1	(Spain) Marina Martinez Lobo (Spain) Sofía Saiz	
1/8/2024	(Spain) Marina Guinart (Spain) Nuria Rodriguez	7–6 / 6–2	(Spain) Martina Fassio Goyeneche (Spain) Raquel Eugenio Barrera	
1/8/2024	(Spain) Marta Ortega (Portugal) Sofia Araújo	6–2 / 6–3	(Italy) Giorgia Marchetti (France) Lea Godallier	

=== Quarter-Finals ===
Men's

Date	Winners	Score	Opponent	Refs.
2/8/2024	(Spain) Juan Lebrón (Argentina) Martin Di Nenno	6–1 / 7–6	(Argentina) Alex Chozas (Argentina) Valentino Libaak	
2/8/2024	(Spain) Eduardo Alonso (Spain) Momo Gonzalez	6–4 / 6–2	(Spain) Inigo Jofre (Spain) Luis Hernandez Quesada	
2/8/2024	(Spain) Pablo Cardona (Spain) Paquito Navarro	7–5 / 7–6	(Spain) Alejandro Arroyo (Argentina) Sanyo Gutiérrez	
2/8/2024	(Spain) Coki Nieto (Spain) Jon Sanz	6–4 / 7–6	(Argentina) Franco Stupaczuk (Spain) Mike Yanguas	

Women's

Date	Winners	Score	Opponent	Refs.
2/8/2024	(Spain) Ariana Sánchez (Spain) Paula Josemaria	6–2 / 6–0	(Spain) Carmen Goenaga (Argentina) Virginia Riera	
2/8/2024	(Spain) Alejandra Alonso (Spain) Andrea Ustero	7–5 / 6–3	(Argentina) Claudia Jensen (Spain) Jessica Castelló	
2/8/2024	(Spain) Alejandra Salazar (Spain) Verónica Virseda	7–6 / 6–0	(Spain) Lucia Sainz (Spain) Patricia Llaguno	
2/8/2024	(Spain) Marta Ortega (Portugal) Sofia Araújo	6–1 / 6–2	(Spain) Marina Guinart (Spain) Nuria Rodriguez	

=== Semi-Finals ===
Men's

Date	Winners	Score	Opponent	Refs.
3/8/2024	(Spain) Juan Lebrón (Argentina) Martin Di Nenno	6–4 / 6–3	(Spain) Eduardo Alonso (Spain) Momo Gonzalez	
3/8/2024	(Spain) Coki Nieto (Spain) Jon Sanz	7–6 / 3–6 / 7–6	(Spain) Pablo Cardona (Spain) Paquito Navarro	

Women's

Date	Winners	Score	Opponent	Refs.
3/8/2024	(Spain) Ariana Sánchez (Spain) Paula Josemaria	6–4 / 6–1	(Spain) Alejandra Alonso (Spain) Andrea Ustero	
3/8/2024	(Spain) Marta Ortega (Portugal) Sofia Araújo	6–3 / 7–6	(Spain) Alejandra Salazar (Spain) Verónica Virseda	

=== Finals ===
Men's

Date	Winners	Score	Opponent	Refs.
4/8/2024	(Spain) Juan Lebrón (Argentina) Martin Di Nenno	7–5 / 6–3	(Spain) Coki Nieto (Spain) Jon Sanz	

Women's

Date	Winners	Score	Opponent	Refs.
4/8/2024	(Spain) Ariana Sánchez (Spain) Paula Josemaria	6–3 / 6–1	(Spain) Marta Ortega (Portugal) Sofia Araújo	
