= 2019 WPT Mijas Open =

World Padel Tour tournament held in Mijas, Spain

- Date: 6 – 11 August
- Edition: 3rd
- Category: Open
- Location: Mijas, Spain
- Venue: Recinto Ferial Cala de Mijas

Champions
- Men's doubles: (Spain) Alejandro Galán (Brazil) Pablo Lima
- Women's doubles: (Spain) Alejandra Salazar (Spain) Ariana Sánchez

Chronology

The 2019 Mijas Open (officially 2019 World Padel Tour Cervezas Victoria Mijas Open) was the tenth tournament of the seventh season organized by World Padel Tour, the most prestigious padel circuit at the time.

In the women's category, for the second time this season, a pair ranked outside the top four reached the final, with Ana Catarina Nogueira and Paula Josemaria repeating their feat from the Swedish Open, this time by eliminating FIP's number one-ranked pair, Marta Marrero and Marta Ortega, in the semifinals. In the final, they faced the second-ranked pair, Alejandra Salazar and Ariana Sánchez, who were making their seventh final appearance (out of nine possible). In the title match, Ariana and Salazar defeated Nogueira and Josemaria in straight sets, securing their fourth title of the season and the first of both in Mijas.

In the men's category, several records were set. First, Coki Nieto (20 years old) and Javi Ruiz (21 years old) took advantage of the unexpected elimination of the world number 1s, Maxi Sánchez and Sanyo Gutiérrez, to become the youngest men's pair ever (at the time) to reach a final. Their opponents were Alejandro Galán and Pablo Lima, who reached the final for the second consecutive tournament after eliminating Juan Lebrón and Paquito Navarro in the semifinals. In the final, Galán and Lima defeated Coki and Ruiz in straight sets, securing their second title as a pair (Galán's third of the year) and the first for both men in Mijas. With this win, Galán also became the youngest player ever, at just 23 years old, to win five men's titles on the World Padel Tour.

== Head-to-head record between teams ranked in the top 4 during the season ==
=== Men's ===
Record	Maxi–Sanyo	Lebrón–Paquito	Galán–Lima	Lamperti–Mieres	Former Pairs	Díaz–Stupaczuk	Belasteguín–Lima	Galán–J. Mieres
Maxi–Sanyo	—	3–1	—	—		2–0	—	1–1
Lebrón–Paquito	1–3	—	0–2	—		2–1	5–0	2–0
Galán–Lima	—	2–0	—	—		—	—	—
Lamperti–Mieres	—	—	—	—		—	—	—
Former Pairs
Díaz–Stupaczuk	0–2	1–2	—	—		—	0–1	2–0
Belasteguín–Lima	—	0–5	—	—		1–0	—	0–1
Galán–J. Mieres	1–1	0–2	—	—		0–2	1–0	—

=== Women's ===
Record	Marrero–Ortega	Ariana–Salazar	Triay–Sainz	Delfina–Majo
Marrero–Ortega	—	3–2	3–0	2–0
Ariana–Salazar	2–3	—	3–0	4–0
Triay–Sainz	0–3	0–3	—	—
Delfina–Majo	0–2	0–4	—	—

== Draws ==
=== Men's Bracket ===
Round of 32
1	(Argentina) Maxi / (Argentina) Sanyo
Bye
(Spain) J.G. Diestro / (Argentina) J. Restivo	6	1	4
(Argentina) Di Nenno / (Spain) J. Garrido	4	6	6
(Spain) A. Ruiz / (Spain) M. Piñeiro	6	6
Q	(Spain) F. Gil Morales / (Spain) S. Alba	4	4
10	(Argentina) Belasteguín / (Argentina) Tapia	3	6	6
7	(Argentina) A. Allemandi / (Argentina) A. Silingo	6	3	0
5	(Argentina) F. Stupaczuk / (Spain) M. Díaz	6	6
(Spain) J. Barahona / (Spain) J. Gutiérrez	3	3
(Spain) A. Blanco / (Spain) J. Martinez	2	5
(Spain) Coki / (Spain) J. Rico	6	7
(Argentina) J.C. Belluati / (Argentina) R. Moyano	6	3	6
Q	(Argentina) M. Marina / (Spain) Momo	1	6	4
Bye
4	(Spain) J. Mieres / (Argentina) M. Lamperti
3	(Spain) Galán / (Brazil) Lima
Bye
Q	(Spain) C. Fuster / (Portugal) M. Oliveira	6	1	6
(Spain) A. Santana / (Argentina) M. Grabiel	4	6	1
(Argentina) F. Quiles / (Brazil) F. Gomes	6	4	1
(Spain) G. Rubio / (Spain) E. Moreno	4	6	6
(Uruguay) D. Ramos / (Spain) R. Méndez	6	3	4
8	(Argentina) C. Gutiérrez / (Argentina) L. Capra	4	6	6
6	(Spain) J. Ruiz / (Spain) U. Botello	3	6	6
(Brazil) L. Bergamini / (Brazil) L. Campagnolo	6	3	4
(Spain) N. Gadea / (Argentina) S. Nerone	4	2
9	(Argentina) F. Chingotto / (Argentina) J. Tello	6	6
(Spain) Á. Cepero / (Spain) P. Lijó	6	6
Q	(Argentina) A. Patiniotis / (Argentina) Godo Díaz	3	4
Bye
2	(Spain) Lebrón / (Spain) Paquito

Round of 16
1	(Argentina) Maxi / (Argentina) Sanyo	6	6
(Argentina) Di Nenno / (Spain) J. Garrido	2	1
(Spain) A. Ruiz / (Spain) M. Piñeiro	6	6
10	(Argentina) Belasteguín / (Argentina) Tapia	4	4
5	(Argentina) F. Stupaczuk / (Spain) M. Díaz	6	6
(Spain) Coki / (Spain) J. Rico	7	7
(Argentina) J.C. Belluati / (Argentina) R. Moyano	7	1	*
4	(Spain) J. Mieres / (Argentina) M. Lamperti	6	1
3	(Spain) Galán / (Brazil) Lima	6	6
Q	(Spain) C. Fuster / (Portugal) M. Oliveira	4	1
(Spain) G. Rubio / (Spain) E. Moreno	6	6	6
8	(Argentina) C. Gutiérrez / (Argentina) L. Capra	1	7	3
6	(Spain) J. Ruiz / (Spain) U. Botello	6	4	6
9	(Argentina) F. Chingotto / (Argentina) J. Tello	3	6	2
(Spain) Á. Cepero / (Spain) P. Lijó	2	2
2	(Spain) Lebrón / (Spain) Paquito	6	6

Quarter-Final
1	(Argentina) Maxi / (Argentina) Sanyo	6	4	4
(Spain) A. Ruiz / (Spain) M. Piñeiro	4	6	6
(Spain) Coki / (Spain) J. Rico	6	6
(Argentina) J.C. Belluati / (Argentina) R. Moyano	4	2
3	(Spain) Galán / (Brazil) Lima	7	7
(Spain) G. Rubio / (Spain) E. Moreno	5	6
6	(Spain) J. Ruiz / (Spain) U. Botello	1	4
2	(Spain) Lebrón / (Spain) Paquito	6	6

Semi-Finals
(Spain) A. Ruiz / (Spain) M. Piñeiro	3	4
(Spain) Coki / (Spain) J. Rico	6	6
3	(Spain) Galán / (Brazil) Lima	7	6
2	(Spain) Lebrón / (Spain) Paquito	6	3

Finals
(Spain) Coki / (Spain) J. Rico	6	4
3	(Spain) Galán / (Brazil) Lima	7	6

=== Women's Bracket ===
Round of 32
1	(Spain) M. Marrero / (Spain) M. Ortega
Bye
(Spain) A.F. de Ossó / (Spain) S. Ruiz	4	6
(France) A. Collombon / (Spain) N. Traviesa	6	7
(Portugal) S. Araújo / (Argentina) V. Riera	4	6
(Spain) E. Ramírez / (Spain) M. Talavan	6	7
(Spain) C. Goenaga / (Spain) N. Rodríguez	3	2
(Spain) C. Navarro / (Argentina) C. Reiter	6	6
(Portugal) A.C. Nogueira / (Spain) P. Josemaría	6	6
Q	(Argentina) C. Paz / (Spain) L. Torres	1	3
Q	(Uruguay) A. De los Santos / (Uruguay) M. Drosdov	6	3	7
(Spain) A. Blanco / (Spain) B. Caldera	3	6	6
(Spain) A. Galán / (Spain) V. Iglesias	7	7
(Spain) C. Mesa / (Spain) L. Alonso	6	6
Bye
4	(Argentina) D. Brea / (Spain) Majo
3	(Spain) Gemma / (Spain) L. Sainz
Bye
Q	(Spain) C. Castillon / (Spain) M. Marin	4	4
(Spain) A. Tapia / (Spain) J. Castelló	6	6
(Argentina) A. Osoro / (Argentina) N. Brito	6	6
(Spain) E. Carnicero / (Spain) M. Merino	1	2
(Spain) S. Hernández / (Spain) T. Icardo	7	7
(Spain) B. González / (Argentina) C. Tenorio	6	6
(Spain) E. Amatriain / (Spain) P. Llaguno	6	6
(Spain) A. Cantin / (Spain) S. Pujals	1	3
Q	(Spain) L. Rufo / (Spain) S. Saiz	7	1	0
(Spain) M. Villalba / (Spain) V. Virseda	6	6	6
(Spain) L. Martínez / (Spain) T. Navarro	1	6	6
(Spain) N. Rovira / (Brazil) R. Piltcher	6	4	3
Bye
2	(Spain) Ariana / (Spain) Salazar

Round of 16
1	(Spain) M. Marrero / (Spain) M. Ortega	6	6
(France) A. Collombon / (Spain) N. Traviesa	2	4
(Spain) E. Ramírez / (Spain) M. Talavan	3	1
(Spain) C. Navarro / (Argentina) C. Reiter	6	6
(Portugal) A.C. Nogueira / (Spain) P. Josemaría	6	6
Q	(Uruguay) A. De los Santos / (Uruguay) M. Drosdov	3	1
(Spain) A. Galán / (Spain) V. Iglesias	4	2
4	(Argentina) D. Brea / (Spain) Majo	6	6
3	(Spain) Gemma / (Spain) L. Sainz	7	6
(Spain) A. Tapia / (Spain) J. Castelló	5	0
(Argentina) A. Osoro / (Argentina) N. Brito	1	7	3
(Spain) S. Hernández / (Spain) T. Icardo	6	6	6
(Spain) E. Amatriain / (Spain) P. Llaguno	5	6	4
(Spain) M. Villalba / (Spain) V. Virseda	7	3	6
(Spain) L. Martínez / (Spain) T. Navarro	1	3
2	(Spain) Ariana / (Spain) Salazar	6	6

Quarter-Final
1	(Spain) M. Marrero / (Spain) M. Ortega	6	6
(Spain) C. Navarro / (Argentina) C. Reiter	4	2
(Portugal) A.C. Nogueira / (Spain) P. Josemaría	6	4	3
4	(Argentina) D. Brea / (Spain) Majo	4	6	1
3	(Spain) Gemma / (Spain) L. Sainz	6	6
(Spain) S. Hernández / (Spain) T. Icardo	3	1
(Spain) M. Villalba / (Spain) V. Virseda	3	1
2	(Spain) Ariana / (Spain) Salazar	6	6

Semi-Finals
1	(Spain) M. Marrero / (Spain) M. Ortega	3	2
(Portugal) A.C. Nogueira / (Spain) P. Josemaría	6	6
3	(Spain) Gemma / (Spain) L. Sainz	3	2
2	(Spain) Ariana / (Spain) Salazar	6	6

Finals
(Portugal) A.C. Nogueira / (Spain) P. Josemaría	3	4
2	(Spain) Ariana / (Spain) Salazar	6	6

== Results ==
=== Round of 32 ===
Men's
Date	Winners	Score	Opponent	Ref.
7/8/2019	(Spain) Javi Garrido (Argentina) Martín Di Nenno	4–6 / 6–1 / 6–4	(Spain) José García Diestro (Argentina) Juan Manuel Restivo	
7/8/2019	(Spain) Alejandro Ruiz (Spain) Martin Sánchez Piñeiro	6–4 / 6–4	(Spain) Francisco Gil Morales (Spain) Sergio Alba Sánchez	
7/8/2019	(Argentina) Agustín Tapia (Argentina) Fernando Belasteguín	3–6 / 6–3 / 6–0	(Argentina) Agustin Goméz Silingo (Argentina) Adrián Allemandi	
7/8/2019	(Argentina) Franco Stupaczuk (Spain) Matías Díaz	6–3 / 6–3	(Spain) Javier Barahona (Spain) Jorge Ruiz Gutiérrez	
7/8/2019	(Spain) Coki Nieto (Spain) Javi Rico	6–2 / 7–5	(Spain) Adrián Blanco (Spain) Javier Martinez Vazquez	
7/8/2019	(Argentina) Juan Cruz Belluati (Argentina) Ramiro Moyano	6–1 / 3–6 / 6–4	(Argentina) Matías Marina Artusa (Spain) Momo González	
7/8/2019	(Spain) Christian Fuster (Portugal) Miguel Oliveira	6–4 / 1–6 / 6–1	(Spain) Aday Santana (Argentina) Maxi Grabiel	
7/8/2019	(Spain) Gonzalo Rubio (Spain) Ernesto Moreno	4–6 / 6–4 / 6–1	(Argentina) Federico Quiles (Brazil) Francisco Gomes	
7/8/2019	(Argentina) Cristian Gutiérrez (Argentina) Lucho Capra	4–6 / 6–3 / 6–4	(Uruguay) Diego Ramos (Spain) Rafael Méndez	
7/8/2019	(Spain) Javi Ruiz (Spain) Uri Botello	3–6 / 6–3 / 6–4	(Brazil) Lucas Bergamini (Brazil) Lucas Campagnolo	
7/8/2019	(Argentina) Federico Chingotto (Argentina) Juan Tello	6–4 / 6–2	(Spain) Nacho Gadea (Argentina) Sebastián Nerone	
7/8/2019	(Spain) Álvaro Cepero (Spain) Pablo Lijó	6–3 / 6–4	(Argentina) Aris Patiniotis (Argentina) Godo Díaz	

Women's
Date	Winners	Score	Opponent	Ref.
7/8/2019	(France) Alix Collombon (Spain) Nicole Traviesa Mola	6–4 / 7–6	(Spain) Ana Fernández de Ossó (Spain) Sara Ruiz	
7/8/2019	(Spain) Elena Ramírez (Spain) Marta Talavan	6–4 / 7–6	(Portugal) Sofia Araújo (Argentina) Virginia Riera	
7/8/2019	(Spain) Carolina Navarro (Argentina) Cecilia Reiter	6–3 / 6–2	(Spain) Carmen Goenaga (Spain) Nuria Rodríguez	
7/8/2019	(Portugal) Ana Catarina Nogueira (Spain) Paula Josemaría	6–1 / 6–3	(Argentina) Celeste Paz (Spain) Laia Bonilla Torres	
7/8/2019	(Uruguay) Andreína De los Santos (Uruguay) Manuela Alaga Drosdov	6–3 / 3–6 / 7–6	(Spain) Alicia Blanco Rojo (Spain) Beatriz Caldera	
7/8/2019	(Spain) Alba Galán (Spain) Victoria Iglesias	7–6 / 7–6	(Spain) Carla Mesa (Spain) Lorena Alonso	
7/8/2019	(Spain) Anna Cortiles Tapia (Spain) Jessica Castelló	6–4 / 6–4	(Spain) Carmen Castillon (Spain) Magdalena Marin	
7/8/2019	(Argentina) Aranzazu Osoro (Argentina) Nela Brito	6–1 / 6–2	(Spain) Esther Carnicero (Spain) Melania Merino	
7/8/2019	(Spain) Sandra Hernández (Spain) Tamara Icardo	7–6 / 7–6	(Spain) Beatriz González (Argentina) Catalina Tenorio	
7/8/2019	(Spain) Elisabeth Amatriain (Spain) Patricia Llaguno	6–1 / 6–3	(Spain) Angela Caro Cantin (Spain) Sara Pujals	
7/8/2019	(Spain) Maria Villalba (Spain) Verónica Virseda	6–7 / 6–1 / 6–0	(Spain) Lorena Rufo (Spain) Sofía Saiz	
7/8/2019	(Spain) Lucía Martínez (Spain) Teresa Navarro	1–6 / 6–4 / 6–3	(Spain) Nuria Rovira (Brazil) Raquel Piltcher	

=== Round of 16 ===
Men's
Date	Winners	Score	Opponent	Ref.
8/8/2019	(Argentina) Maxi Sánchez (Argentina) Sanyo Gutiérrez	6–2 / 6–1	(Spain) Javi Garrido (Argentina) Martín Di Nenno	
8/8/2019	(Spain) Alejandro Ruiz (Spain) Martin Sánchez Piñeiro	6–4 / 6–4	(Argentina) Agustín Tapia (Argentina) Fernando Belasteguín	
8/8/2019	(Spain) Coki Nieto (Spain) Javi Rico	7–6 / 7–6	(Argentina) Franco Stupaczuk (Spain) Matías Díaz	
8/8/2019	(Argentina) Juan Cruz Belluati (Argentina) Ramiro Moyano	7–6 / 1–1 / W.O.	(Spain) Juani Mieres (Argentina) Miguel Lamperti	
8/8/2019	(Spain) Alejandro Galán (Brazil) Pablo Lima	6–4 / 6–1	(Spain) Christian Fuster (Portugal) Miguel Oliveira	
8/8/2019	(Spain) Gonzalo Rubio (Spain) Ernesto Moreno	6–1 / 6–7 / 6–3	(Argentina) Cristian Gutiérrez (Argentina) Lucho Capra	
8/8/2019	(Spain) Javi Ruiz (Spain) Uri Botello	6–3 / 4–6 / 6–2	(Argentina) Federico Chingotto (Argentina) Juan Tello	
8/8/2019	(Spain) Juan Lebrón (Spain) Paquito Navarro	6–2 / 6–2	(Spain) Álvaro Cepero (Spain) Pablo Lijó	

Women's
Date	Winners	Score	Opponent	Ref.
8/8/2019	(Spain) Marta Marrero (Spain) Marta Ortega	6–2 / 6–4	(France) Alix Collombon (Spain) Nicole Traviesa Mola	
8/8/2019	(Spain) Carolina Navarro (Argentina) Cecilia Reiter	6–3 / 6–1	(Spain) Elena Ramírez (Spain) Marta Talavan	
8/8/2019	(Portugal) Ana Catarina Nogueira (Spain) Paula Josemaría	6–3 / 6–1	(Uruguay) Andreína De los Santos (Uruguay) Manuela Alaga Drosdov	
8/8/2019	(Argentina) Delfina Brea (Spain) Majo Sánchez	6–4 / 6–2	(Spain) Alba Galán (Spain) Victoria Iglesias	
8/8/2019	(Spain) Gemma Triay (Spain) Lucia Sainz	7–5 / 6–0	(Spain) Anna Cortiles Tapia (Spain) Jessica Castelló	
8/8/2019	(Spain) Sandra Hernández (Spain) Tamara Icardo	6–1 / 6–7 / 6–3	(Argentina) Aranzazu Osoro (Argentina) Nela Brito	
8/8/2019	(Spain) Maria Villalba (Spain) Verónica Virseda	7–5 / 3–6 / 6–4	(Spain) Elisabeth Amatriain (Spain) Patricia Llaguno	
8/8/2019	(Spain) Alejandra Salazar (Spain) Ariana Sánchez	6–1 / 6–3	(Spain) Lucía Martínez (Spain) Teresa Navarro	

=== Quarter-Finals ===
Men's
Date	Winners	Score	Opponent	Ref.
9/8/2019	(Spain) Alejandro Ruiz (Spain) Martin Sánchez Piñeiro	4–6 / 6–4 / 6–4	(Argentina) Maxi Sánchez (Argentina) Sanyo Gutiérrez	
9/8/2019	(Spain) Coki Nieto (Spain) Javi Rico	6–4 / 6–2	(Argentina) Juan Cruz Belluati (Argentina) Ramiro Moyano	
9/8/2019	(Spain) Alejandro Galán (Brazil) Pablo Lima	7–5 / 7–6	(Spain) Gonzalo Rubio (Spain) Ernesto Moreno	
9/8/2019	(Spain) Juan Lebrón (Spain) Paquito Navarro	6–1 / 6–4	(Spain) Javi Ruiz (Spain) Uri Botello	

Women's
Date	Winners	Score	Opponent	Ref.
9/8/2019	(Spain) Marta Marrero (Spain) Marta Ortega	6–4 / 6–2	(Spain) Carolina Navarro (Argentina) Cecilia Reiter	
9/8/2019	(Portugal) Ana Catarina Nogueira (Spain) Paula Josemaría	6–4 / 4–6 / 3–1 / W.O.	(Argentina) Delfina Brea (Spain) Majo Sánchez	
9/8/2019	(Spain) Gemma Triay (Spain) Lucia Sainz	6–3 / 6–1	(Spain) Sandra Hernández (Spain) Tamara Icardo	
9/8/2019	(Spain) Alejandra Salazar (Spain) Ariana Sánchez	6–3 / 6–1	(Spain) Maria Villalba (Spain) Verónica Virseda	

=== Semi-Finals ===
Men's
Date	Winners	Score	Opponent	Ref.
10/8/2019	(Spain) Coki Nieto (Spain) Javi Rico	6–3 / 6–4	(Spain) Alejandro Ruiz (Spain) Martin Sánchez Piñeiro	
10/8/2019	(Spain) Alejandro Galán (Brazil) Pablo Lima	7–6 / 6–3	(Spain) Juan Lebrón (Spain) Paquito Navarro	

Women's
Date	Winners	Score	Opponent	Ref.
10/8/2019	(Portugal) Ana Catarina Nogueira (Spain) Paula Josemaría	6–3 / 6–2	(Spain) Marta Marrero (Spain) Marta Ortega	
10/8/2019	(Spain) Alejandra Salazar (Spain) Ariana Sánchez	6–3 / 6–2	(Spain) Gemma Triay (Spain) Lucia Sainz	

=== Finals ===
Men's
Date	Winners	Score	Opponent	Ref.
11/8/2019	(Spain) Alejandro Galán (Brazil) Pablo Lima	7–6 / 6–4	(Spain) Coki Nieto (Spain) Javi Rico	

Women's
Date	Winners	Score	Opponent	Ref.
11/8/2019	(Spain) Alejandra Salazar (Spain) Ariana Sánchez	6–3 / 6–4	(Portugal) Ana Catarina Nogueira (Spain) Paula Josemaría	
