= 2019 WPT Portugal Master =

World Padel Tour tournament held in Cascais, Portugal

- Date: 16 – 22 September
- Edition: 5th (Note: The first two editions were held as a Open event.)
- Category: Master
- Location: Madrid, Portugal
- Venue: Jardins Casino Estoril

Champions
- Men's doubles: (Spain) Alejandro Galán (Brazil) Pablo Lima
- Women's doubles: (Spain) Marta Marrero (Spain) Marta Ortega

Chronology

The 2019 Portugal Master (officially 2019 World Padel Tour Cascais Padel Master) was the twelfth tournament of the seventh season organized by World Padel Tour, the most prestigious padel circuit at the time.

In the women's category, the top two pairs in the FIP rankings both reached their eighth final of the season, marking the sixth time they had faced each other in a title match. In the final, world number ones Marta Marrero and Marta Ortega defeated Alejandra Salazar and Ariana Sánchez, securing their sixth title of the year and the first for both of them in Portugal. With this victory, Marrero and Ortega also extended their lead over Ariana and Salazar in terms of titles, having won 4 Open's and 2 Master's, compared to their rivals 3 Open's and 1 Master.

In the men's category, Federico Chingotto and Juan Tello reached a major tournament finals for the first time in their careers after eliminating the defending champions and current world number 1s, Maxi Sánchez and Sanyo Gutiérrez, in the semifinals. Their opponents were the world number 3 pair, Alejandro Galán and Pablo Lima, who were making their third final appearance in the four tournaments since they began playing together. In the final, Galán and Lima defeated Chingotto and Tello in straight sets, securing their third title as a pair (Galán's fourth of the year) and Galán's first in Portugal (for Lima, it was his second, having previously won there in 2017). With this victory, Galán and Lima also drew level with Maxi and Sanyo in titles won, with each pair having won 2 Open's and 1 Master, trailing only to Juan Lebrón and Paquito Navarro, who had won four titles (3 Opens and 1 Master).

== Head-to-head record between teams ranked in the top 4 during the season ==
=== Men's ===
Record	Maxi–Sanyo	Lebrón–Paquito	Galán–Lima	Lamperti–Mieres	Former Pairs	Díaz–Stupaczuk	Belasteguín–Lima	Galán–J. Mieres
Maxi–Sanyo	—	3–1	—	—		3–0	—	1–1
Lebrón–Paquito	1–3	—	0–2	—		2–1	5–0	2–0
Galán–Lima	—	2–0	—	—		—	—	—
Lamperti–Mieres	—	—	—	—		—	—	—
Former Pairs
Díaz–Stupaczuk	0–3	1–2	—	—		—	0–1	2–0
Belasteguín–Lima	—	0–5	—	—		1–0	—	0–1
Galán–J. Mieres	1–1	0–2	—	—		0–2	1–0	—

=== Women's ===
Record	Marrero–Ortega	Ariana–Salazar	Triay–Sainz	Majo–Mapi	Former Pairs	Delfina–Majo
Marrero–Ortega	—	4–2	3–0	—		2–0
Ariana–Salazar	2–4	—	3–0	1–0		4–0
Triay–Sainz	0–3	0–3	—	—		—
Majo–Mapi	—	0–1	—	—		—
Former Pairs
Delfina–Majo	0–2	0–4	—	—		—

== Draws ==
=== Men's Bracket ===
Round of 32
1	(Argentina) Maxi / (Argentina) Sanyo	7	7
(Argentina) J.C. Belluati / (Argentina) R. Moyano	6	6
(Spain) C. Fuster / (Portugal) M. Oliveira	6	4	6
(Spain) A. Blanco / (Spain) J. Martinez	4	6	4
(Argentina) C. Gutiérrez / (Argentina) F. Quiles	4	6	6
(Spain) Coki / (Spain) J. Rico	6	3	3
(Spain) E. Alonso / (Portugal) V. Pascoal	2	6
7	(Argentina) F. Stupaczuk / (Spain) M. Díaz	6	7
5	(Spain) J. Ruiz / (Spain) U. Botello	6	6
Q	(Argentina) A. Britos / (Argentina) G. Tamame	0	3
Q	(Spain) R. Marcos / (Spain) R. Martinez	6	2	3
(Spain) A. Ruiz / (Spain) M. Piñeiro	3	6	6
9	(Argentina) F. Chingotto / (Argentina) J. Tello	6	6	6
(Spain) J.G. Diestro / (Spain) P. Fernandéz	1	7	4
(Spain) N. Gadea / (Argentina) S. Nerone	2	2
4	(Spain) J. Mieres / (Argentina) M. Lamperti	6	6
3	(Spain) Galán / (Brazil) Lima	7	7
(Spain) Á. Cepero / (Spain) P. Lijó	6	5
Q	(Spain) Coello / (Argentina) J. Vazquez	0	3
Q	(Argentina) M. Marina / (Spain) Momo	6	6
(Argentina) J. Restivo / (Spain) M. Solbes	6	2	5
(Spain) J. Barahona / (Spain) J. Gutiérrez	3	6	7
(Spain) J. Rico / (Spain) V. Ruiz	2	0
8	(Argentina) A. Allemandi / (Argentina) A. Silingo	6	6
6	(Argentina) Belasteguín / (Argentina) Tapia	6	6
(Brazil) L. Campagnolo / (Argentina) L. Capra	3	2
(Argentina) Di Nenno / (Spain) J. Garrido	7	5	*
(Spain) A. Santana / (Brazil) L. Bergamini	6	4
(Spain) G. Rubio / (Spain) E. Moreno	7	6
(Brazil) M. Jardim / (Argentina) M. Grabiel	6	3
(Uruguay) D. Ramos / (Spain) R. Méndez	5	1
2	(Spain) Lebrón / (Spain) Paquito	7	6

Round of 16
1	(Argentina) Maxi / (Argentina) Sanyo	3	7	6
(Spain) C. Fuster / (Portugal) M. Oliveira	6	6	3
(Argentina) C. Gutiérrez / (Argentina) F. Quiles	6	0	4
7	(Argentina) F. Stupaczuk / (Spain) M. Díaz	4	6	6
5	(Spain) J. Ruiz / (Spain) U. Botello	6	6
(Spain) A. Ruiz / (Spain) M. Piñeiro	7	7
9	(Argentina) F. Chingotto / (Argentina) J. Tello	7	6
4	(Spain) J. Mieres / (Argentina) M. Lamperti	5	2
3	(Spain) Galán / (Brazil) Lima	6	6
Q	(Argentina) M. Marina / (Spain) Momo	4	1
(Spain) J. Barahona / (Spain) J. Gutiérrez	6	4	4
8	(Argentina) A. Allemandi / (Argentina) A. Silingo	4	6	6
6	(Argentina) Belasteguín / (Argentina) Tapia	*
(Argentina) Di Nenno / (Spain) J. Garrido
(Spain) G. Rubio / (Spain) E. Moreno	4	3
2	(Spain) Lebrón / (Spain) Paquito	6	6

Quarter-Final
1	(Argentina) Maxi / (Argentina) Sanyo	7	0	6
7	(Argentina) F. Stupaczuk / (Spain) M. Díaz	6	6	4
(Spain) A. Ruiz / (Spain) M. Piñeiro	7	2	4
9	(Argentina) F. Chingotto / (Argentina) J. Tello	6	6	6
3	(Spain) Galán / (Brazil) Lima	6	6
8	(Argentina) A. Allemandi / (Argentina) A. Silingo	1	0
6	(Argentina) Belasteguín / (Argentina) Tapia	6	7
2	(Spain) Lebrón / (Spain) Paquito	2	6

Semi-Finals
1	(Argentina) Maxi / (Argentina) Sanyo	6	3
9	(Argentina) F. Chingotto / (Argentina) J. Tello	7	6
3	(Spain) Galán / (Brazil) Lima	6	6
6	(Argentina) Belasteguín / (Argentina) Tapia	1	2

Finals
9	(Argentina) F. Chingotto / (Argentina) J. Tello	4	4
3	(Spain) Galán / (Brazil) Lima	6	6

=== Women's Bracket ===
Round of 32
1	(Spain) M. Marrero / (Spain) M. Ortega
Bye
(France) A. Collombon / (Spain) N. Traviesa	6	6
(Spain) A. Blanco / (Spain) B. Caldera	2	4
(Portugal) S. Araújo / (Argentina) V. Riera	6	6
Q	(Spain) A. Cantin / (Spain) N. Rovira	4	1
(Portugal) M. Fernandes / (Portugal) P. Ribeiro	2	3
6	(Portugal) A.C. Nogueira / (Spain) P. Josemaría	6	6
5	(Spain) E. Amatriain / (Spain) P. Llaguno	4	6	6
(Spain) M. Villalba / (Spain) V. Virseda	6	3	3
(Spain) L. Martínez / (Spain) T. Navarro	2	0
(Spain) A. Galán / (Spain) V. Iglesias	6	6
(Spain) E. Carnicero / (Spain) M. Merino	6	6
Q	(Spain) L. Alonso / (Spain) S. Pujals	3	4
Bye
3	(Spain) Gemma / (Spain) L. Sainz
4	(Spain) Majo / (Spain) Mapi
Bye
(Portugal) D. Da Silva / (Portugal) K. Rodrigues	0	2
(Spain) C. Goenaga / (Spain) N. Rodríguez	6	6
(Spain) A. Martinez / (Argentina) C. Tenorio	6	6
(Spain) E. Ramírez / (Spain) M. Talavan	4	3
(Spain) A. Tapia / (Spain) J. Castelló	1	4
8	(Spain) C. Navarro / (Argentina) C. Reiter	6	6
7	(Spain) B. González / (Argentina) D. Brea	6	6
(Argentina) A. Osoro / (Argentina) N. Brito	3	4
Q	(Spain) A. Cañellas / (Spain) J. Bautista	0	1
(Spain) C. Mesa / (Brazil) R. Piltcher	6	6
Q	(Belgium) H. Wyckaert / (Spain) S. Bellver	0	3
(Spain) S. Hernández / (Spain) T. Icardo	6	6
Bye
2	(Spain) Ariana / (Spain) Salazar

Round of 16
1	(Spain) M. Marrero / (Spain) M. Ortega	6	6
(France) A. Collombon / (Spain) N. Traviesa	2	2
(Portugal) S. Araújo / (Argentina) V. Riera	3	1
6	(Portugal) A.C. Nogueira / (Spain) P. Josemaría	6	6
5	(Spain) E. Amatriain / (Spain) P. Llaguno	2	6	6
(Spain) A. Galán / (Spain) V. Iglesias	6	3	2
(Spain) E. Carnicero / (Spain) M. Merino	0	5
3	(Spain) Gemma / (Spain) L. Sainz	6	7
4	(Spain) Majo / (Spain) Mapi	7	6
(Spain) C. Goenaga / (Spain) N. Rodríguez	6	1
(Spain) A. Martinez / (Argentina) C. Tenorio	1	4
8	(Spain) C. Navarro / (Argentina) C. Reiter	6	6
7	(Spain) B. González / (Argentina) D. Brea	6	6
(Spain) C. Mesa / (Brazil) R. Piltcher	2	1
(Spain) S. Hernández / (Spain) T. Icardo	1	2
2	(Spain) Ariana / (Spain) Salazar	6	6

Quarter-Final
1	(Spain) M. Marrero / (Spain) M. Ortega	6	4	6
6	(Portugal) A.C. Nogueira / (Spain) P. Josemaría	2	6	4
5	(Spain) E. Amatriain / (Spain) P. Llaguno	3	6	6
3	(Spain) Gemma / (Spain) L. Sainz	6	0	3
4	(Spain) Majo / (Spain) Mapi	6	6	6
8	(Spain) C. Navarro / (Argentina) C. Reiter	1	7	1
7	(Spain) B. González / (Argentina) D. Brea	3	4
2	(Spain) Ariana / (Spain) Salazar	6	6

Semi-Finals
1	(Spain) M. Marrero / (Spain) M. Ortega	4	6	6
5	(Spain) E. Amatriain / (Spain) P. Llaguno	6	1	2
4	(Spain) Majo / (Spain) Mapi	4	0
2	(Spain) Ariana / (Spain) Salazar	6	6

Finals
1	(Spain) M. Marrero / (Spain) M. Ortega	7	6
2	(Spain) Ariana / (Spain) Salazar	5	3

== Results ==
=== Round of 32 ===
Men's
Date	Winners	Score	Opponent	Ref.
18/9/2019	(Argentina) Maxi Sánchez (Argentina) Sanyo Gutiérrez	7–6 / 7–6	(Argentina) Juan Cruz Belluati (Argentina) Ramiro Moyano	
18/9/2019	(Spain) Christian Fuster (Portugal) Miguel Oliveira	6–4 / 4–6 / 6–4	(Spain) Adrián Blanco (Spain) Javier Martinez Vazquez	
18/9/2019	(Argentina) Cristian Gutiérrez (Argentina) Federico Quiles	4–6 / 6–3 / 6–3	(Spain) Coki Nieto (Spain) Javi Rico	
18/9/2019	(Argentina) Franco Stupaczuk (Spain) Matías Díaz	6–2 / 7–6	(Spain) Eduardo Alonso (Portugal) Vasco Pascoal	
18/9/2019	(Spain) Javi Ruiz (Spain) Uri Botello	6–0 / 6–3	(Argentina) Andrés Britos (Argentina) Germán Tamame	
18/9/2019	(Spain) Alejandro Ruiz (Spain) Martin Sánchez Piñeiro	3–6 / 6–2 / 6–3	(Spain) Raúl Marcos Durán (Spain) Ricardo Martinez	
18/9/2019	(Argentina) Federico Chingotto (Argentina) Juan Tello	6–1 / 6–7 / 6–4	(Spain) José García Diestro (Spain) Pincho Fernández	
18/9/2019	(Spain) Juani Mieres (Argentina) Miguel Lamperti	6–2 / 6–2	(Spain) Nacho Gadea (Argentina) Sebastián Nerone	
18/9/2019	(Spain) Alejandro Galán (Brazil) Pablo Lima	7–6 / 7–5	(Spain) Álvaro Cepero (Spain) Pablo Lijó	
18/9/2019	(Argentina) Matías Marina (Spain) Momo González	6–0 / 6–3	(Spain) Arturo Coello (Argentina) Juan Manuel Vazquez	
18/9/2019	(Spain) Javier Barahona (Spain) Jorge Ruiz Gutiérrez	3–6 / 6–2 / 7–5	(Argentina) Juan Manuel Restivo (Spain) Miguel Solbes	
18/9/2019	(Argentina) Agustin Goméz Silingo (Argentina) Adrián Allemandi	6–2 / 6–0	(Spain) José Rico (Spain) Víctor Ruiz	
18/9/2019	(Argentina) Agustín Tapia (Argentina) Fernando Belasteguín	6–3 / 6–2	(Brazil) Lucas Campagnolo (Argentina) Lucho Capra	
18/9/2019	(Spain) Javi Garrido (Argentina) Martín Di Nenno	7–6 / 5–4 / W.O.	(Spain) Aday Santana (Brazil) Lucas Bergamini	
18/9/2019	(Spain) Gonzalo Rubio (Spain) Ernesto Moreno	7–6 / 6–3	(Brazil) Marcello Jardim (Argentina) Maxi Grabiel	
18/9/2019	(Spain) Juan Lebrón (Spain) Paquito Navarro	7–5 / 6–1	(Uruguay) Diego Ramos (Spain) Rafael Méndez	

Women's
Date	Winners	Score	Opponent	Ref.
18/9/2019	(France) Alix Collombon (Spain) Nicole Traviesa Mola	6–2 / 6–4	(Spain) Alicia Blanco Rojo (Spain) Beatriz Caldera	
18/9/2019	(Portugal) Sofia Araújo (Argentina) Virginia Riera	6–4 / 6–1	(Spain) Angela Caro Cantin (Spain) Nuria Rovira	
18/9/2019	(Portugal) Ana Catarina Nogueira (Spain) Paula Josemaría	6–2 / 6–3	(Portugal) Margarida Fernandes (Portugal) Patricia Ribeiro	
18/9/2019	(Spain) Elisabeth Amatriain (Spain) Patricia Llaguno	4–6 / 6–3 / 6–3	(Spain) Maria Villalba (Spain) Verónica Virseda	
18/9/2019	(Spain) Alba Galán (Spain) Victoria Iglesias	6–2 / 6–0	(Spain) Lucía Martínez (Spain) Teresa Navarro	
18/9/2019	(Spain) Esther Carnicero (Spain) Melania Merino	6–3 / 6–4	(Spain) Lorena Alonso (Spain) Sara Pujals	
18/9/2019	(Spain) Carmen Goenaga (Spain) Nuria Rodríguez	6–0 / 6–2	(Portugal) Diana Da Silva (Portugal) Katia Rodrigues	
18/9/2019	(Spain) Araceli Martinez (Argentina) Catalina Tenorio	6–4 / 6–3	(Spain) Elena Ramírez (Spain) Marta Talavan	
18/9/2019	(Spain) Carolina Navarro (Argentina) Cecilia Reiter	6–1 / 6–4	(Spain) Anna Cortiles Tapia (Spain) Jessica Castelló	
18/9/2019	(Spain) Bea González (Argentina) Delfina Brea	6–3 / 6–4	(Argentina) Aranzazu Osoro (Argentina) Nela Brito	
18/9/2019	(Spain) Carla Mesa (Brazil) Raquel Piltcher	6–0 / 6–1	(Spain) Ariadna Cañella (Spain) Julia Polo Bautista	
18/9/2019	(Spain) Sandra Hernández (Spain) Tamara Icardo	6–0 / 6–3	(Belgium) Helena Wyckaert (Spain) Sandra Bellver	

=== Round of 16 ===
Men's
Date	Winners	Score	Opponent	Ref.
19/9/2019	(Argentina) Maxi Sánchez (Argentina) Sanyo Gutiérrez	3–6 / 7–6 / 6–3	(Spain) Christian Fuster (Portugal) Miguel Oliveira	
19/9/2019	(Argentina) Franco Stupaczuk (Spain) Matías Díaz	4–6 / 6–0 / 6–4	(Argentina) Cristian Gutiérrez (Argentina) Federico Quiles	
19/9/2019	(Spain) Alejandro Ruiz (Spain) Martin Sánchez Piñeiro	7–6 / 7–6	(Spain) Javi Ruiz (Spain) Uri Botello	
19/9/2019	(Argentina) Federico Chingotto (Argentina) Juan Tello	7–5 / 6–2	(Spain) Juani Mieres (Argentina) Miguel Lamperti	
19/9/2019	(Spain) Alejandro Galán (Brazil) Pablo Lima	6–4 / 6–1	(Argentina) Matías Marina (Spain) Momo González	
19/9/2019	(Argentina) Agustin Goméz Silingo (Argentina) Adrián Allemandi	4–6 / 6–4 / 6–4	(Spain) Javier Barahona (Spain) Jorge Ruiz Gutiérrez	
19/9/2019	(Argentina) Agustín Tapia (Argentina) Fernando Belasteguín	W.O.	(Spain) Javi Garrido (Argentina) Martín Di Nenno	
19/9/2019	(Spain) Juan Lebrón (Spain) Paquito Navarro	6–4 / 6–3	(Spain) Gonzalo Rubio (Spain) Ernesto Moreno	

Women's
Date	Winners	Score	Opponent	Ref.
19/9/2019	(Spain) Marta Marrero (Spain) Marta Ortega	6–2 / 6–2	(France) Alix Collombon (Spain) Nicole Traviesa Mola	
19/9/2019	(Portugal) Ana Catarina Nogueira (Spain) Paula Josemaría	6–3 / 6–1	(Portugal) Sofia Araújo (Argentina) Virginia Riera	
19/9/2019	(Spain) Elisabeth Amatriain (Spain) Patricia Llaguno	2–6 / 6–3 / 6–2	(Spain) Alba Galán (Spain) Victoria Iglesias	
19/9/2019	(Spain) Gemma Triay (Spain) Lucia Sainz	6–0 / 7–5	(Spain) Esther Carnicero (Spain) Melania Merino	
19/9/2019	(Spain) Majo Sánchez (Spain) Mapi Sánchez	7–6 / 6–1	(Spain) Carmen Goenaga (Spain) Nuria Rodríguez	
19/9/2019	(Spain) Carolina Navarro (Argentina) Cecilia Reiter	6–1 / 6–4	(Spain) Araceli Martinez (Argentina) Catalina Tenorio	
19/9/2019	(Spain) Bea González (Argentina) Delfina Brea	6–2 / 6–1	(Spain) Carla Mesa (Brazil) Raquel Piltcher	
19/9/2019	(Spain) Alejandra Salazar (Spain) Ariana Sánchez	6–1 / 6–2	(Spain) Sandra Hernández (Spain) Tamara Icardo	

=== Quarter-Finals ===
Men's
Date	Winners	Score	Opponent	Ref.
20/9/2019	(Argentina) Maxi Sánchez (Argentina) Sanyo Gutiérrez	7–6 / 0–6 / 6–4	(Argentina) Franco Stupaczuk (Spain) Matías Díaz	
20/9/2019	(Argentina) Federico Chingotto (Argentina) Juan Tello	6–7 / 6–2 / 6–4	(Spain) Alejandro Ruiz (Spain) Martin Sánchez Piñeiro	
20/9/2019	(Spain) Alejandro Galán (Brazil) Pablo Lima	6–1 / 6–0	(Argentina) Agustin Goméz Silingo (Argentina) Adrián Allemandi	
20/9/2019	(Argentina) Agustín Tapia (Argentina) Fernando Belasteguín	6–2 / 7–6	(Spain) Juan Lebrón (Spain) Paquito Navarro	

Women's
Date	Winners	Score	Opponent	Ref.
20/9/2019	(Spain) Marta Marrero (Spain) Marta Ortega	6–2 / 4–6 / 6–4	(Portugal) Ana Catarina Nogueira (Spain) Paula Josemaría	
20/9/2019	(Spain) Elisabeth Amatriain (Spain) Patricia Llaguno	3–6 / 6–0 / 6–3	(Spain) Gemma Triay (Spain) Lucia Sainz	
20/9/2019	(Spain) Majo Sánchez (Spain) Mapi Sánchez	6–1 / 6–7 / 6–1	(Spain) Carolina Navarro (Argentina) Cecilia Reiter	
20/9/2019	(Spain) Alejandra Salazar (Spain) Ariana Sánchez	6–3 / 6–4	(Spain) Bea González (Argentina) Delfina Brea	

=== Semi-Finals ===
Men's
Date	Winners	Score	Opponent	Ref.
21/9/2019	(Argentina) Federico Chingotto (Argentina) Juan Tello	7–6 / 6–3	(Argentina) Maxi Sánchez (Argentina) Sanyo Gutiérrez	
21/9/2019	(Spain) Alejandro Galán (Brazil) Pablo Lima	6–1 / 6–2	(Argentina) Agustín Tapia (Argentina) Fernando Belasteguín	

Women's
Date	Winners	Score	Opponent	Ref.
21/9/2019	(Spain) Marta Marrero (Spain) Marta Ortega	4–6 / 6–1 / 6–2	(Spain) Elisabeth Amatriain (Spain) Patricia Llaguno	
21/9/2019	(Spain) Alejandra Salazar (Spain) Ariana Sánchez	6–4 / 6–0	(Spain) Majo Sánchez (Spain) Mapi Sánchez	

=== Finals ===
Men's
Date	Winners	Score	Opponent	Ref.
22/9/2019	(Spain) Alejandro Galán (Brazil) Pablo Lima	6–4 / 6–4	(Argentina) Federico Chingotto (Argentina) Juan Tello	

Women's
Date	Winners	Score	Opponent	Ref.
22/9/2019	(Spain) Marta Marrero (Spain) Marta Ortega	7–5 / 6–3	(Spain) Alejandra Salazar (Spain) Ariana Sánchez	
