= 2019 World Padel Tour =

Seventh edition of the World Padel Tour

Details
- Duration: 19 March – 15 December
- Edition: 7th
- Tournaments: 21
- Categories: Challenger (3); Open (11); WOpen (1); Master (5); Master Final (1)

Achievements (singles)
- Most titles: Men's (shared) (Argentina) Maxi Sánchez (Argentina) Sanyo Gutiérrez (Spain) Alejandro Galán (Spain) Juan Lebrón (Spain) Paquito Navarro (5); Women's (Spain) Marta Marrero (Spain) Marta Ortega (7)
- Most finals: Men's (Spain) Juan Lebrón (Spain) Paquito Navarro (10); Women's (shared) (Spain) Alejandra Salazar (Spain) Ariana Sánchez (Spain) Marta Marrero (Spain) Marta Ortega (10)

The 2019 World Padel Tour was the seventh edition of the World Padel Tour, the most prestigious professional padel circuit in the world.

The 2019 World Padel Tour was the seventh edition of the World Padel Tour, the most prestigious professional padel circuit in the world.

In the men's category, during the first part of the season Juan Lebrón & Paquito Navarro, along with Maxi Sánchez & Sanyo Gutiérrez, dominated the circuit in the fight for the top ranking. In the second part of the season, Alejandro Galán & Pablo Lima entered the competition, winning three out of four tournaments, making the race a three-way tie. Lebrón and Paquito eventually surpassed their rivals, becoming the first Spanish pair in seventeen years to reach the top of the ranking.

In the women's category, the top two ranked pairs monopolized the circuit, with Marta Marrero and Marta Ortega, along with Alejandra Salazar and Ariana Sánchez, winning twelve out of fifteen tournaments. The 'Martas' would ultimately prevail in the dispute, with Marta Marrero achieving the second year-end No. 1 ranking of her career and Marta Ortega becoming the youngest women's world number one of all time.

== Season summary ==
=== Partner and ranking changes ===
In the women's category, the main change would be the separation of the number two and four ranked pairs, with Alejandra Salazar and Marta Marrero splitting up to form pairs with Ariana Sánchez and Marta Ortega respectively. The number 1 ranked pair would also be broken up, not due to separation but because of an injury to Mapi Sánchez, who would be sidelined for approximately four months after shoulder surgery. The injury would force her sister, Majo Sánchez, to play with the 20-year-old Argentinian Delfina Brea, who was ranked 20th in the world, starting as the fourth best-ranked pair on the circuit.

On the men's side, there would be no changes to the number 1 and 2 ranked pairs. The new pairs would be Paquito Navarro, who would join the 2018 breakout player, Juan Lebrón, who switched to the "drive" (right-handed) position, starting as the third best-ranked pair. Franco Stupaczuk would also part ways with Cristian Gutiérrez to team up with Matí Díaz, while Alejandro Galán would join forces with Juani Mieres, completing the top five.

=== First part of the season ===
==== March–May ====
In the season's opening tournament, in both the men's and women's categories, the two pairs who would fight for the world number 1 ranking during the season reached the finals. In the men's tournament, Maxi Sánchez & Sanyo Gutiérrez defeated Juan Lebrón & Paquito Navarro to become the season's inaugural champions, while in the women's tournament, Marta Marrero & Marta Ortega defeated Ariana Sánchez & Alejandra Salazar to become the first pair of the year to win a title in the women's category.

In the following tournament in Logroño, both the men's and women's finals featured the same participants and the same winners as in Marbella. However, in the next tournament in Alicante, the number 1 pairs in both categories did not reach the final, with the number 2 pairs winning their first title of the year. In the men's tournament, Lebrón & Paquito defeated (for the third consecutive tournament) Fernando Belasteguín & Pablo Lima in the championship match, while in the women's tournament, Ariana & Salazar defeated Delfina Brea & Majo Sánchez. However, in the following tournament in Vigo, the number 1 pairs would win their third title of the season each, with Maxi & Sanyo beating Lebrón & Paquito for the third consecutive time in finals, and Marrero & Ortega defeating Gemma Triay & Lucia Sainz.

In the last tournament of May, the Jaén Open, both number 2 pairs finally managed to defeat their rivals in the final to lift their second title of the season, with Lebrón & Paquito beating Maxi & Sanyo in two sets, and Ariana & Salazar beating the 'Martas' in three sets.

==== June ====
In June, the last three tournaments of the first half of the season would be played. In the first of the three, the Argentina Master, there would only be men's draw and with the final being the first without any of the top-two pairs. Alejandro Galán & Juani Mieres would in the competition after Belasteguín & Lima (who were playing their last tournament together) retired following an injury to the Argentinian.

In the following two tournaments, the Valladolid and Sweden Master's, Lebrón & Paquito would win both finals, the first against Galán & Mieres and the second against Franco Stupaczuk & Matías Díaz, finishing the first half of the season with seven finals played and four titles won (1 Master and 3 Open's) against four finals and three titles (1 Master and Open's) by their rivals Maxi & Sanyo. On the women's side, Ariana & Salazar defeated their main rivals to win in Valladolid, while Marrero & Ortega defeated Ana Catarina Nogueira & Paula Josemaría, who reached their first career final, in Sweden. With this, the 'Martas' completed the first half of the season having played in six finals and won four (1 Master and 3 Open's) compared to Ariana & Salazar's five finals and 3 titles (1 Master and 2 Open's).

=== Second part of the season ===
==== July–September ====
The second half of the season would begin differently for both the men's and women's teams. On the men's side, the new world number 3 pair, Alejandro Galán & Pablo Lima, would win their two first tournaments together, conquering the Valencia and Mijas Open's. On the women's side, the top 2 would continue to dominate, with Marrero & Ortega winning in Valencia and Ariana & Salazar winning in Mijas. The Mijas final would also set a new record, with Coki Nieto (20 years old) and Javi Ruiz (21 years old) becoming (at the time) the youngest pair ever to reach a final.

The first tournament in September would be the Madrid Master. Juan Lebrón entered the tournament with the possibility of becoming the sole leader of the ranking if he won the event, however, he was defeated in the round of 16 by Agustín Tapia and Fernando Belasteguín, who as an unseeded pair, eliminated the 2nd-seeded pair (Lebrón–Paquito), the 5th seeds (Díaz–Stupaczuk), and the 6th seeds (Botello–Ruíz), as well as the world number 1s, Maxi Sánchez & Sanyo Gutiérrez, on their way to the title. Something similar happened in the women's tournament, with Alejandra Salazar having the possibility of taking the sole lead in the women's ranking, but she and Ariana were eliminated by Ana Catarina Nogueira & Paula Josemaria, who eliminated the 3rd (Gemma–Lucia), 2nd (Ariana–Salazar), and 5th (Amatriain–Llaguno) pairs on their way to their first career title. The second competition of the month, the Portugal Master, was won by Galán & Lima, who by winning the tournament, equaled Maxi & Sanyo in titles (1 Master and 2 Open's each), with Galán having one more individually. On the women's side, Marrero & Ortega, by defeating Ariana & Salazar in the final, increased their lead in first place, having won one more Open and Master than their rivals.

==== October–November ====
Between October and November, the five final tournaments of the regular season would be played, with two of them having both men's and women's draws, one being exclusively women's, and the other two exclusively men's.

On the women's side, two of the three tournaments would be won by pairs who had not won any title during the season. The twins Majo & Mapi Sánchez, playing their second tournament since Mapi returned from injury, would win the Menorca Open to claim their first title of the year, while Gemma Triay & Lucia Sainz would win their only title of the year by winning the Santander WOpen. The last of the three events would end the race for the world number 1 ranking, with Ariana Sánchez & Alejandra Salazar being eliminated in the quarterfinals, automatically crowning Marta Marrero & Marta Ortega, who also won the tournament, as the pair that would finish 2019 as world number one.

On the men's side, Maxi & Sanyo slightly increased their lead at the top of the rankings by winning the Menorca Open. However, in the following tournament in Córdoba, their early elimination gave Lebrón the chance to take the top spot in the rankings if he won the tournament, something that didn't materialize as Lebrón & Paquito were defeated in the final by Franco Stupaczuk & Matías Díaz, who celebrated their first title of the year. The number 1 spot came in the following tournament, the São Paulo Open, which Lebrón & Paquito won, with Lebrón becoming the first Spaniard to reach the top of rankings and also becoming the top ranked pair with Paquito. The race for the top spot in the rankings would end in the following tournament, the Mexico Open, where although Maxi & Sanyo won the tournament, Lebrón & Paquito's reaching the final was enough to mathematically guarantee them the year-end number one ranking.

==== December ====
In the final tournament of the season, the Master Final, most of the highlights came from pairs playing their last tournament together as they would separate for the following season.

On the women's side, for the seventh time this season, the number one and second ranked pairs faced each other in the finals. The winners were the No. 2 ranked pair, Ariana Sánchez & Alejandra Salazar, who defeated Marta Marrero & Marta Ortega, who, despite finishing the year in first place, would separate.

On the men's side, neither the number 1 nor the number 2 pair reached the final, with the former being eliminated by Agustín Tapia & Fernando Belasteguín and the latter by Alejandro Galán & Pablo Lima. In the final, Galán & Lima, who were also playing their last tournament as a pair, defeated Belasteguín & Tapia to win the title. The victory also made history as, for the first time, the men's top 3 was filled by three Spanish players (Lebrón and Paquito in 1st and Galán alone in 3rd).

== Tournaments and results ==
Open Master Challenger Master Final

Tournament	Date	Men's			Women's		
Tournament	Date	Winners	Score	Runners-up	Winners	Score	Runners-up
(Spain) Marbella Master	19 – 24 March	(Argentina) Maxi Sánchez (Argentina) Sanyo Gutiérrez	6–1 / 7–6	(Spain) Juan Lebrón (Spain) Paquito Navarro	(Spain) Marta Marrero (Spain) Marta Ortega	4–6 / 6–1 / 6–4	(Spain) Alejandra Salazar (Spain) Ariana Sánchez
(Spain) Logroño Open	9 – 14 April	(Argentina) Maxi Sánchez (Argentina) Sanyo Gutiérrez	7–6 / 7–6	(Spain) Juan Lebrón (Spain) Paquito Navarro	(Spain) Marta Marrero (Spain) Marta Ortega	4–6 / 7–5 / 6–3	(Spain) Alejandra Salazar (Spain) Ariana Sánchez
(Spain) Alicante Open	23 – 28 April	(Spain) Juan Lebrón (Spain) Paquito Navarro	3–6 / 7–6 / 6–2	(Argentina) Fernando Belasteguín (Brazil) Pablo Lima	(Spain) Alejandra Salazar (Spain) Ariana Sánchez	6–2 / 7–5	(Argentina) Delfina Brea (Spain) Majo Sánchez
(Spain) Vigo Open	7 – 12 May	(Argentina) Maxi Sánchez (Argentina) Sanyo Gutiérrez	6–3 / 6–4	(Spain) Juan Lebrón (Spain) Paquito Navarro	(Spain) Marta Marrero (Spain) Marta Ortega	6–2 / 6–2	(Spain) Gemma Triay (Spain) Lucía Sainz
(Spain) Jaén Open	21 – 26 May	(Spain) Juan Lebrón (Spain) Paquito Navarro	7–5 / 6–4	(Argentina) Maxi Sánchez (Argentina) Sanyo Gutiérrez	(Spain) Alejandra Salazar (Spain) Ariana Sánchez	7–5 / 2–6 / 7–5	(Spain) Marta Marrero (Spain) Marta Ortega
Argentina Master	4 – 9 June	(Spain) Alejandro Galán (Spain) Juani Mieres	5–5 / WO	(Argentina) Fernando Belasteguín (Brazil) Pablo Lima	Not contested		
(Spain) Valladolid Master	18 – 23 June	(Spain) Juan Lebrón (Spain) Paquito Navarro	6–7 / 6–4 / 6–4	(Spain) Alejandro Galán (Spain) Juani Mieres	(Spain) Alejandra Salazar (Spain) Ariana Sánchez	5–7 / 6–1 / 6–4	(Spain) Marta Marrero (Spain) Marta Ortega
(Sweden) Swedish Open	25 – 30 June	(Spain) Juan Lebrón (Spain) Paquito Navarro	6–3 / 7–6	(Argentina) Franco Stupaczuk (Spain) Matías Díaz	(Spain) Marta Marrero (Spain) Marta Ortega	6–2 / 6–1	(Portugal) Ana Catarina Nogueira (Spain) Paula Josemaría
(Spain) Valencia Open	9 – 14 July	(Spain) Alejandro Galán (Brazil) Pablo Lima	6–7 / 7–5 / 6–3	(Argentina) Adrián Allemandi (Argentina) Agustín Silingo	(Spain) Marta Marrero (Spain) Marta Ortega	6–3 / 6–2	(Spain) Alejandra Salazar (Spain) Ariana Sánchez
(Spain) Mijas Open	6 – 11 August	(Spain) Alejandro Galán (Brazil) Pablo Lima	7–6 / 6–4	(Spain) Coki Nieto (Spain) Javier Rico	(Spain) Alejandra Salazar (Spain) Ariana Sánchez	6–3 / 6–4	(Portugal) Ana Catarina Nogueira (Spain) Paula Josemaría
(Spain) Madrid Master	3 – 8 September	(Argentina) Agustín Tapia (Argentina) Fernando Belasteguín	6–4 / 6–4	(Argentina) Maxi Sánchez (Argentina) Sanyo Gutiérrez	(Portugal) Ana Catarina Nogueira (Spain) Paula Josemaría	6–4 / 6–3	(Spain) Elisabeth Amatriaín (Spain) Patricia Llaguno
(Spain) Oureiro De Rei Lugo Challenger	9 – 15 September	(Spain) Álvaro Cépero (Spain) Pablo Lijó	4–6 / 6–4 / 7–5	(Spain) Alex Ruiz (Spain) Martin Piñeiro	Not contested		
Portugal Master	17 – 22 September	(Spain) Alejandro Galán (Brazil) Pablo Lima	6–4 / 6–4	(Argentina) Federico Chingotto (Argentina) Juan Tello	(Spain) Marta Marrero (Spain) Marta Ortega	7–5 / 6–3	(Spain) Alejandra Salazar (Spain) Ariana Sánchez
(France) Paris Challenger	29 September – 6 October	(Brazil) Lucas Campagnolo (Argentina) Lucho Capra	6–1 / 6–2	(Spain) Alex Ruiz (Spain) Martin Piñeiro	(Spain) Bea González (Argentina) Delfina Brea	0–6 / 6–3 / 6–2	(Spain) Carolina Navarro (Argentina) Cecilia Reiter
(Spain) Menorca Open	8 – 13 October	(Argentina) Maxi Sánchez (Argentina) Sanyo Gutiérrez	6–4 / 6–3	(Spain) Javi Ruiz (Spain) Uri Botello	(Spain) Mapi Sánchez (Spain) Majo Sánchez	5–7 / 7–6 / 6–1	(Spain) Alejandra Salazar (Spain) Ariana Sánchez
(United Kingdom) London Master	15 – 20 October	Canceled			Canceled		
(Spain) San Javier Challenger	20 – 27 October	(Spain) Coki Nieto (Spain) Javier Rico	6–4 / 6–4	(Argentina) Juan Cruz Belluati (Argentina) Ramiro Moyano	(Spain) Bea González (Argentina) Delfina Brea	6–2 / 6–4	(Spain) Carolina Navarro (Argentina) Cecilia Reiter
(Spain) Santander WOpen	29 October – 3 November	Women's Tournament			(Spain) Gemma Triay (Spain) Lucía Sainz	6–2 / 6–7 / 6–4	(Spain) Mapi Sánchez (Spain) Majo Sánchez
(Spain) Córdoba Open	12 – 17 November	(Argentina) Franco Stupaczuk (Spain) Matías Díaz	6–3 / 6–3	(Spain) Juan Lebrón (Spain) Paquito Navarro	(Spain) Marta Marrero (Spain) Marta Ortega	6–2 / 6–0	(Spain) Elisabeth Amatriaín (Spain) Patricia Llaguno
(Brazil) São Paulo Open	19 – 24 November	(Spain) Juan Lebrón (Spain) Paquito Navarro	6–3 / 6–2	(Spain) Javi Ruiz (Spain) Uri Botello	Not contested		
Mexico Open	26 November – 1 December	(Argentina) Maxi Sánchez (Argentina) Sanyo Gutiérrez	6–7 / 7–6 / 6–2	(Spain) Juan Lebrón (Spain) Paquito Navarro	Not contested		
Egypt Exhibition	6 December	No winners			No winners		
(Spain) Master Final	12 – 15 December	(Spain) Alejandro Galán (Brazil) Pablo Lima	7–6 / 6–3	(Argentina) Agustín Tapia (Argentina) Fernando Belasteguín	(Spain) Alejandra Salazar (Spain) Ariana Sánchez	7–5 / 3–6 / 7–6	(Spain) Marta Marrero (Spain) Marta Ortega

== End of season ranking ==
=== Men's Ranking ===
2019 Men's Ranking			Tournament Statistics				Tournaments Won			
N.º	Name	Points	Matches	Wins	Losses	Win %	Open	Master	Master Final	Total
1	(Spain) Juan Lebrón	11.330	60	48	12	80	4	1	0	5
1	(Spain) Paquito Navarro	11.330	60	48	12	80	4	1	0	5
3	(Spain) Alejandro Galán	10.690	52	40	12	76.92	2	2	1	5
4	(Argentina) Maxi Sánchez	10.110	51	39	11	76.47	4	1	0	5
4	(Argentina) Sanyo Gutiérrez	10.110	51	39	11	76.47	4	1	0	5
6	(Brazil) Pablo Lima	9.770	51	40	11	78.43	2	1	1	4
7	(Argentina) Fernando Belasteguín	7.915	46	33	18	71.74	0	1	0	1
8	(Argentina) Agustín Tapia	5.610	37	23	19	62.16	0	1	0	1
9	(Argentina) Franco Stupaczuk	5.310	50	34	16	68	1	0	0	1
10	(Spain) Matías Díaz	5.105	47	32	15	68.09	1	0	0	1
11	(Spain) Juani Mieres	5.055	32	17	15	53.13	0	1	0	1
12	(Spain) Javi Ruiz	4.935	51	34	17	66.67	0	0	0	0
12	(Spain) Uri Botello	4.935	51	34	17	66.67	0	0	0	0
14	(Argentina) Federico Chingotto	4.320	46	29	16	63.04	0	0	0	0
14	(Argentina) Juan Tello	4.320	46	29	16	63.04	0	0	0	0
16	(Argentina) Agustin Gomez Silingo	3.445	38	21	17	55.26	0	0	0	0

=== Women's Ranking ===
2019 Women's Ranking			Tournament Statistics				Tournaments Won			
N.º	Name	Points	Matches	Wins	Losses	Win %	Open	Master	Master Final	Total
1	(Spain) Marta Marrero	12.490	52	44	8	84.62	5	2	0	7
1	(Spain) Marta Ortega	12.490	52	44	8	84.62	5	2	0	7
3	(Spain) Alejandra Salazar	11.260	50	40	10	80	3	1	1	5
3	(Spain) Ariana Sánchez	11.260	50	40	10	80	3	1	1	5
5	(Spain) Majo Sánchez	6.555	43	29	14	67.44	1	0	0	1
6	(Portugal) Ana Catarina Nogueira	6.055	44	30	14	68.18	1	0	0	1
6	(Spain) Paula Josemaría	6.055	44	30	14	68.18	1	0	0	1
8	(Spain) Gemma Triay	5.375	37	24	13	64.86	0	1	0	1
8	(Spain) Lucía Sainz	5.375	37	24	13	64.86	0	1	0	1
10	(Spain) Elisabet Amatriaín	5.335	50	35	15	70	0	0	0	0
10	(Spain) Patricia Llaguno	5.335	50	35	15	70	0	0	0	0
12	(Argentina) Delfina Brea	5.310	42	27	15	64.29	0	0	0	0
13	(Spain) Beatriz González	3.360	40	25	15	62.5	0	0	0	0
14	(Spain) Mapi Sánchez	3.115	18	13	5	72.22	1	0	0	1
15	(Spain) Carolina Navarro	3.110	38	23	15	60.53	0	0	0	0
15	(Argentina) Cecilia Reiter	3.110	38	23	15	60.53	0	0	0	0
