= 2019 WPT Alicante Open =

World Padel Tour tournament held in Alicante, Spain

- Date: 23 – 28 April
- Edition: 12th (Note: The first seven editions were held under the organization of the Padel Pro Tour.)
- Category: Open
- Location: Alicante, Spain
- Venue: Pabellón Pedro Ferrándiz

Champions
- Men's doubles: (Spain) Juan Lebrón (Spain) Paquito Navarro
- Women's doubles: (Spain) Alejandra Salazar (Spain) Ariana Sánchez

Chronology

The 2019 Alicante Open (officially 2019 World Padel Tour Trofeo Ayuntamiento de Alicante Open) was the third tournament of the seventh season organized by World Padel Tour, the most prestigious padel circuit at the time.

In the women’s category, the early elimination of Marta Marrero and Marta Ortega, which in case of victory would make Marrero the new number one in the world rankings, opened the path for the fourth ranked pair in the FIP rankings, Delfina Brea and Majo Sánchez (the latter being the sole leader of the rankings), to reach their first final of the season. There, they would face the second-ranked pair, Alejandra Salazar and Ariana Sánchez. In the final match, Ariana and Salazar defeated Delfina and Majo in straight sets, securing their first title of the season and allowing Salazar to successfully defend the title she had won the previous year (which had also marked the first victory for her partner, Ariana, in the competition).

In the men’s category, similarly to the women’s, the world number 1 pair, Maxi Sánchez and Sanyo Gutiérrez, we're also eliminated earlier than expected, leaving the path open to the world number 3-ranked duo, Juan Lebrón and Paquito Navarro, to reach the finals. They would face the world number 2 pair, Fernando Belasteguín and Pablo Lima, marking the third consecutive tournament in which these two teams met, though this time it was in the final (the first of the season for Bela and Lima). In the decisive match, Lebrón and Paquito defeated Belasteguín and Lima in three sets, preventing them from defending the title they had won the previous year and securing their own first title of the season. This victory marked Paquito’s first title in Alicante, the first in Lebrón’s career and the first time a team with two spanish players won a title.

== Head-to-head record between teams ranked in the top 4 during the season ==
=== Men's ===
Record	Maxi–Sanyo	Belasteguín–Lima	Lebrón–Paquito	Galán–J. Mieres
Maxi–Sanyo	—	—	2–0	1–0
Belasteguín–Lima	—	—	0–3	—
Lebrón–Paquito	0–2	3–0	—	—
Galán–J. Mieres	0–1	—	—	—

=== Women's ===
Record	Marrero–Ortega	Ariana–Salazar	Triay–Sainz	Delfina–Majo
Marrero–Ortega	—	2–0	1–0	—
Ariana–Salazar	0–2	—	1–0	2–0
Triay–Sainz	0–1	0–1	—	—
Delfina–Majo	—	0–2	—	—

== Draws ==
=== Men's Bracket ===
Round of 32
1	(Argentina) Maxi / (Argentina) Sanyo
Bye
Q	(Spain) M. Solbes / (Spain) J. Gutiérrez	3	0
(Argentina) F. Chingotto / (Argentina) J. Tello	6	6
(Spain) A. Ruiz / (Spain) M. Piñeiro	6	6
(Argentina) A. Patiniotis / (Spain) J. Muñoz	2	4
(Argentina) F. Poggi / (Argentina) M. Grabiel	6	1
(Spain) J. Ruiz / (Spain) U. Botello	7	6
(Argentina) F.Stupaczuk / (Spain) M. Díaz	6	6
(Argentina) F. Quiles / (Spain) J.G. Diestro	2	3
(Spain) A. Santana / (Argentina) Godo Díaz	4	2
(Spain) Á. Cepero / (Argentina) S. Nerone	6	6
(Spain) Coki / (Spain) J. Rico	3	6	6
(Brazil) F. Gomes / (Argentina) G. Tamame	6	1	3
Bye
3	(Spain) Lebrón / (Spain) Paquito
4	(Spain) Galán / (Spain) J. Mieres
Bye
Q	(Portugal) M. Oliveira / (Spain) W. Lahoz	3	4
(Uruguay) D. Ramos / (Argentina) J. Restivo	6	6
(Spain) N. Gadea / (Spain) R. Méndez	3	6	6
Q	(Argentina) Di Nenno / (Spain) J. Garrido	6	2	7
(Argentina) A. Allemandi / (Argentina) A. Silingo	6	7
(Argentina) C. Gutiérrez / (Argentina) R. Moyano	0	5
(Argentina) L. Capra / (Argentina) M. Lamperti	3	6
(Brazil) L. Bergamini / (Brazil) L. Campagnolo	6	7
(Spain) G. Rubio / (Spain) E. Moreno	6	6
(Spain) J.C. Belluati / (Spain) P. Lijó	7	7
(Spain) J. Rico / (Spain) V. Ruiz	6	6
(Argentina) G. Reca / (Spain) P. Fernández	4	3
Bye
2	(Argentina) Belasteguín / (Brazil) Lima

Round of 16
1	(Argentina) Maxi / (Argentina) Sanyo	6	4	5
(Argentina) F. Chingotto / (Argentina) J. Tello	2	6	7
(Spain) A. Ruiz / (Spain) M. Piñeiro	6	7
(Spain) J. Ruiz / (Spain) U. Botello	3	6
(Argentina) F.Stupaczuk / (Spain) M. Díaz	6	6
(Spain) Á. Cepero / (Argentina) S. Nerone	1	1
(Spain) Coki / (Spain) J. Rico	1	6	2
3	(Spain) Lebrón / (Spain) Paquito	6	4	6
4	(Spain) Galán / (Spain) J. Mieres	5	6	3
(Uruguay) D. Ramos / (Argentina) J. Restivo	7	3	6
(Argentina) Di Nenno / (Spain) J. Garrido	7	6
(Argentina) A. Allemandi / (Argentina) A. Silingo	5	3
(Brazil) L. Bergamini / (Brazil) L. Campagnolo	4	3
(Spain) J.C. Belluati / (Spain) P. Lijó	6	6
(Spain) J. Rico / (Spain) V. Ruiz	3	3
2	(Argentina) Belasteguín / (Brazil) Lima	6	6

Quarter-Final
(Argentina) F. Chingotto / (Argentina) J. Tello	4	6	6
(Spain) A. Ruiz / (Spain) M. Piñeiro
(Argentina) F.Stupaczuk / (Spain) M. Díaz	3	4
3	(Spain) Lebrón / (Spain) Paquito	6	6
(Uruguay) D. Ramos / (Argentina) J. Restivo	6	6	1
(Argentina) Di Nenno / (Spain) J. Garrido	7	4	6
(Spain) J.C. Belluati / (Spain) P. Lijó	3	2
2	(Argentina) Belasteguín / (Brazil) Lima	6	6

Semi-Finals
(Argentina) F. Chingotto / (Argentina) J. Tello	6	2	4
3	(Spain) Lebrón / (Spain) Paquito	3	6	6
(Argentina) Di Nenno / (Spain) J. Garrido	3	6	3
2	(Argentina) Belasteguín / (Brazil) Lima	6	3	6

Finals
3	(Spain) Lebrón / (Spain) Paquito	3	7	6
2	(Argentina) Belasteguín / (Brazil) Lima	6	6	2

=== Women's Bracket ===
Round of 32
1	(Spain) M. Marrero / (Spain) M. Ortega
Bye
(Spain) A. Cantin / (Spain) S. Ruiz	0	6	1
(France) A. Collombon / (Spain) N. Traviesa	6	3	6
(Portugal) A.C. Nogueira / (Spain) P. Josemaría	6	6
Q	(Spain) L. Rufo / (Spain) S. Saiz	2	3
(Spain) M. Villalba / (Spain) T. Navarro	0	1
(Spain) E. Amatriain / (Spain) P. Llaguno	6	6
(Spain) C. Navarro / (Argentina) C. Reiter	6	6
(Spain) I. Domínguez / (Spain) V. Alonso	2	3
(Spain) C. Perez / (Spain) L. Torres	5	2
(Spain) E. Ramírez / (Spain) M. Truchado	7	6
(Spain) A.F. de Ossó / (Spain) S. Pujals	6	6
Q	(Spain) C. Goenaga / (Spain) N. Rodríguez	1	1
Bye
4	(Argentina) D. Brea / (Spain) Majo
3	(Spain) Gemma / (Spain) L. Sainz
Bye
Q	(Italy) C. Cipriani / (Italy) G. Sussarello	5	3
(Spain) S. Hernández / (Spain) T. Icardo	7	6
Q	(Spain) N. Rovira / (Brazil) R. Piltcher	2	7	3
(Portugal) S. Araújo / (Argentina) V. Riera	6	5	6
(Spain) A. Martinez / (Spain) M. Talavan	6	1
(Spain) A. Galán / (Spain) V. Iglesias	7	6
(Spain) B. González / (Argentina) C. Tenorio	6	6
(Spain) L. Alonso / (Spain) V. Virseda	1	1
(Spain) A. Tapia / (Spain) J. Castelló	6	3	5
(Argentina) A. Osoro / (Argentina) N. Brito	3	6	7
(Spain) A. Blanco / (Spain) B. Caldera	4	6	3
(Spain) C. Mesa / (Spain) L. Martínez	6	3	6
Bye
2	(Spain) Ariana / (Spain) Salazar

Round of 16
1	(Spain) M. Marrero / (Spain) M. Ortega	7	6
(France) A. Collombon / (Spain) N. Traviesa	5	2
(Portugal) A.C. Nogueira / (Spain) P. Josemaría	2	6
(Spain) E. Amatriain / (Spain) P. Llaguno	6	7
(Spain) C. Navarro / (Argentina) C. Reiter	6	6
(Spain) E. Ramírez / (Spain) M. Truchado	1	1
(Spain) A.F. de Ossó / (Spain) S. Pujals	1	1
4	(Argentina) D. Brea / (Spain) Majo	6	6
3	(Spain) Gemma / (Spain) L. Sainz	6	6
(Spain) S. Hernández / (Spain) T. Icardo	3	0
(Portugal) S. Araújo / (Argentina) V. Riera	6	7
(Spain) A. Galán / (Spain) V. Iglesias	3	5
(Spain) B. González / (Argentina) C. Tenorio	6	6
(Argentina) A. Osoro / (Argentina) N. Brito	4	3
(Spain) C. Mesa / (Spain) L. Martínez	1	1
2	(Spain) Ariana / (Spain) Salazar	6	6

Quarter-Final
1	(Spain) M. Marrero / (Spain) M. Ortega	6	2	2
(Spain) E. Amatriain / (Spain) P. Llaguno	4	6	6
(Spain) C. Navarro / (Argentina) C. Reiter	2	2
4	(Argentina) D. Brea / (Spain) Majo	6	6
3	(Spain) Gemma / (Spain) L. Sainz	6	6
(Portugal) S. Araújo / (Argentina) V. Riera	1	2
(Spain) B. González / (Argentina) C. Tenorio	1	0
2	(Spain) Ariana / (Spain) Salazar	6	1	*

Semi-Finals
(Spain) E. Amatriain / (Spain) P. Llaguno	6	3	2
4	(Argentina) D. Brea / (Spain) Majo	1	6	6
3	(Spain) Gemma / (Spain) L. Sainz	4	1
2	(Spain) Ariana / (Spain) Salazar	6	6

Finals
4	(Argentina) D. Brea / (Spain) Majo	2	5
2	(Spain) Ariana / (Spain) Salazar	6	7

== Results ==
=== Round of 32 ===
Men's
Date	Winners	Score	Opponent	Ref.
24/4/2019	(Argentina) Federico Chingotto (Argentina) Juan Tello	6–3 / 6–0	(Spain) Jorge Ruiz Gutiérrez (Spain) Miguel Solbes	
24/4/2019	(Spain) Alejandro Ruiz (Spain) Martin Sánchez Piñeiro	6–2 / 6–4	(Argentina) Aris Patiniotis (Spain) Jordi Muñoz	
24/4/2019	(Spain) Javi Ruiz (Spain) Uri Botello	7–6 / 6–1	(Argentina) Fernando Poggi (Argentina) Maxi Grabiel	
24/4/2019	(Argentina) Franco Stupaczuk (Spain) Matías Díaz	6–2 / 6–3	(Argentina) Federico Quiles (Spain) José García Diestro	
24/4/2019	(Spain) Álvaro Cepero (Argentina) Sebastián Nerone	6–4 / 6–2	(Spain) Aday Santana (Argentina) Godo Díaz	
24/4/2019	(Spain) Coki Nieto (Spain) Javi Rico	3–6 / 6–1 / 6–3	(Brazil) Francisco Chico Gomes (Argentina) Germán Tamame	
24/4/2019	(Uruguay) Diego Ramos (Argentina) Juan Manuel Restivo	6–3 / 6–4	(Portugal) Miguel Oliveira (Spain) Willy Lahoz	
24/4/2019	(Spain) Javi Garrido (Argentina) Martín Di Nenno	6–3 / 2–6 / 7–6	(Spain) Nacho Gadea (Spain) Rafael Méndez	
24/4/2019	(Argentina) Agustin Goméz Silingo (Argentina) Adrián Allemandi	6–0 / 7–5	(Argentina) Cristian Gutiérrez (Argentina) Ramiro Moyano	
24/4/2019	(Brazil) Lucas Bergamini (Brazil) Lucas Campagnolo	6–3 / 7–6	(Argentina) Lucho Capra (Argentina) Miguel Lamperti	
24/4/2019	(Argentina) Juan Cruz Belluati (Spain) Pablo Lijó	7–6 / 7–6	(Spain) Gonzalo Rubio (Spain) Ernesto Moreno	
24/4/2019	(Spain) José Rico (Spain) Víctor Ruiz	6–4 / 6–3	(Argentina) Gaby Reca (Spain) Pincho Fernández	

Women's
Date	Winners	Score	Opponent	Ref.
24/4/2019	(France) Alix Collombon (Spain) Nicole Traviesa Mola	6–0 / 3–6 / 6–1	(Spain) Angela Caro Cantin (Spain) Sara Ruiz	
24/4/2019	(Portugal) Ana Catarina Nogueira (Spain) Paula Josemaría	6–2 / 6–3	(Spain) Lorena Rufo (Spain) Sofía Saiz	
24/4/2019	(Spain) Elisabeth Amatriain (Spain) Patricia Llaguno	6–0 / 6–1	(Spain) Maria Villalba (Spain) Teresa Navarro	
24/4/2019	(Spain) Carolina Navarro (Argentina) Cecilia Reiter	6–2 / 6–3	(Spain) Isabel Domínguez (Spain) Vanesa Alonso	
24/4/2019	(Spain) Elena Ramírez (Spain) Meli García Truchado	7–5 / 6–2	(Spain) Cynthia Perez (Spain) Laia Bonilla Torres	
24/4/2019	(Spain) Carmen Goenaga (Spain) Nuria Rodríguez	6–1 / 6–1	(Spain) Ana Fernández de Ossó (Spain) Sara Pujals	
24/4/2019	(Spain) Sandra Hernández (Spain) Tamara Icardo	7–5 / 6–3	(Italy) Chiara Pappacena Cipriani (Italy) Giulia Sussarello	
24/4/2019	(Portugal) Sofia Araújo (Argentina) Virginia Riera	6–2 / 5–7 / 6–3	(Spain) Nuria Rovira (Brazil) Raquel Piltcher	
24/4/2019	(Spain) Alba Galán (Spain) Victoria Iglesias	7–6 / 6–1	(Spain) Araceli Martinez (Spain) Marta Talavan	
24/4/2019	(Spain) Beatriz González (Argentina) Catalina Tenorio	6–1 / 6–1	(Spain) Lorena Alonso (Spain) Verónica Virseda	
24/4/2019	(Argentina) Aranzazu Osoro (Argentina) Nela Brito	3–6 / 6–3 / 7–5	(Spain) Anna Cortiles Tapia (Spain) Jessica Castelló	
24/4/2019	(Spain) Carla Mesa (Spain) Lucía Martínez	6–4 / 3–6 / 6–3	(Spain) Alicia Blanco Rojo (Spain) Beatriz Caldera	

=== Round of 16 ===
Men's
Date	Winners	Score	Opponent	Ref.
25/4/2019	(Argentina) Federico Chingotto (Argentina) Juan Tello	2–6 / 6–4 / 7–5	(Argentina) Maxi Sánchez (Argentina) Sanyo Gutiérrez	
25/4/2019	(Spain) Alejandro Ruiz (Spain) Martin Sánchez Piñeiro	6–3 / 7–6	(Spain) Javi Ruiz (Spain) Uri Botello	
25/4/2019	(Argentina) Franco Stupaczuk (Spain) Matías Díaz	6–1 / 6–1	(Spain) Álvaro Cepero (Argentina) Sebastián Nerone	
25/4/2019	(Spain) Juan Lebrón (Spain) Paquito Navarro	6–1 / 4–6 / 6–2	(Spain) Coki Nieto (Spain) Javi Rico	
25/4/2019	(Uruguay) Diego Ramos (Argentina) Juan Manuel Restivo	7–5 / 3–6 / 6–3	(Spain) Alejandro Galán (Spain) Juani Mieres	
25/4/2019	(Spain) Javi Garrido (Argentina) Martín Di Nenno	7–5 / 6–3	(Argentina) Agustin Goméz Silingo (Argentina) Adrián Allemandi	
25/4/2019	(Brazil) Lucas Bergamini (Brazil) Lucas Campagnolo	6–4 / 6–3	(Argentina) Juan Cruz Belluati (Spain) Pablo Lijó	
25/4/2019	(Argentina) Fernando Belasteguín (Brazil) Pablo Lima	6–3 / 6–3	(Spain) José Rico (Spain) Víctor Ruiz	

Women's
Date	Winners	Score	Opponent	Ref.
25/4/2019	(Spain) Marta Marrero (Spain) Marta Ortega	7–5 / 6–2	(France) Alix Collombon (Spain) Nicole Traviesa Mola	
25/4/2019	(Spain) Elisabeth Amatriain (Spain) Patricia Llaguno	6–2 / 7–6	(Portugal) Ana Catarina Nogueira (Spain) Paula Josemaría	
25/4/2019	(Spain) Carolina Navarro (Argentina) Cecilia Reiter	6–1 / 6–1	(Spain) Elena Ramírez (Spain) Meli García Truchado	
25/4/2019	(Argentina) Delfina Brea (Spain) Majo Sánchez	6–1 / 6–1	(Spain) Carmen Goenaga (Spain) Nuria Rodríguez	
25/4/2019	(Spain) Gemma Triay (Spain) Lucía Sainz	6–3 / 6–0	(Spain) Sandra Hernández (Spain) Tamara Icardo	
25/4/2019	(Portugal) Sofia Araújo (Argentina) Virginia Riera	6–3 / 7–5	(Spain) Alba Galán (Spain) Victoria Iglesias	
25/4/2019	(Spain) Beatriz González (Argentina) Catalina Tenorio	6–4 / 6–3	(Argentina) Aranzazu Osoro (Argentina) Nela Brito	
25/4/2019	(Spain) Alejandra Salazar (Spain) Ariana Sánchez	6–1 / 6–1	(Spain) Carla Mesa (Spain) Lucía Martínez	

=== Quarter-Finals ===
Men's
Date	Winners	Score	Opponent	Ref.
26/4/2019	(Argentina) Federico Chingotto (Argentina) Juan Tello	4–6 / 6–4 / 6–0	(Spain) Alejandro Ruiz (Spain) Martin Sánchez Piñeiro	
26/4/2019	(Spain) Juan Lebrón (Spain) Paquito Navarro	6–3 / 6–4	(Argentina) Franco Stupaczuk (Spain) Matías Díaz	
26/4/2019	(Spain) Javi Garrido (Argentina) Martín Di Nenno	7–6 / 4–6 / 6–1	(Uruguay) Diego Ramos (Argentina) Juan Manuel Restivo	
26/4/2019	(Argentina) Fernando Belasteguín (Brazil) Pablo Lima	6–3 / 6–2	(Brazil) Lucas Bergamini (Brazil) Lucas Campagnolo	

Women's
Date	Winners	Score	Opponent	Ref.
26/4/2019	(Spain) Elisabeth Amatriain (Spain) Patricia Llaguno	4–6 / 6–2 / 6–2	(Spain) Marta Marrero (Spain) Marta Ortega	
26/4/2019	(Argentina) Delfina Brea (Spain) Majo Sánchez	6–2 / 6–2	(Spain) Carolina Navarro (Argentina) Cecilia Reiter	
26/4/2019	(Spain) Gemma Triay (Spain) Lucía Sainz	6–1 / 6–2	(Portugal) Sofia Araújo (Argentina) Virginia Riera	
26/4/2019	(Spain) Alejandra Salazar (Spain) Ariana Sánchez	6–1 / 1–0 / W.O.	(Spain) Beatriz González (Argentina) Catalina Tenorio	

=== Semi-Finals ===
Men's
Date	Winners	Score	Opponent	Ref.
27/4/2019	(Spain) Juan Lebrón (Spain) Paquito Navarro	3–6 / 6–2 / 6–4	(Argentina) Federico Chingotto (Argentina) Juan Tello	
27/4/2019	(Argentina) Fernando Belasteguín (Brazil) Pablo Lima	6–3 / 3–6 / 6–3	(Spain) Javi Garrido (Argentina) Martín Di Nenno	

Women's
Date	Winners	Score	Opponent	Ref.
27/4/2019	(Argentina) Delfina Brea (Spain) Majo Sánchez	1–6 / 6–3 / 6–2	(Spain) Elisabeth Amatriain (Spain) Patricia Llaguno	
27/4/2019	(Spain) Alejandra Salazar (Spain) Ariana Sánchez	6–4 / 6–1	(Spain) Gemma Triay (Spain) Lucía Sainz	

=== Finals ===
Men's
Date	Winners	Score	Opponent	Ref.
28/4/2019	(Spain) Juan Lebrón (Spain) Paquito Navarro	3–6 / 7–6 / 6–2	(Argentina) Fernando Belasteguín (Brazil) Pablo Lima	

Women's
Date	Winners	Score	Opponent	Ref.
28/4/2019	(Spain) Alejandra Salazar (Spain) Ariana Sánchez	6–2 / 7–5	(Argentina) Delfina Brea (Spain) Majo Sánchez	
