= 2019 WPT Jaén Open =

World Padel Tour tournament held in Jaén, Spain

- Date: 21 – 26 May
- Edition: 2nd
- Category: Open
- Location: Jaén, Spain
- Venue: Plaza de Santa María

Champions
- Men's doubles: (Spain) Juan Lebrón (Spain) Paquito Navarro
- Women's doubles: (Spain) Alejandra Salazar (Spain) Ariana Sánchez

Chronology

The 2019 Jaén Open (officially 2019 World Padel Tour Alisea Ledus Jaén Open) was the fifth tournament of the seventh season organized by World Padel Tour, the most prestigious padel circuit at the time.

In the women’s category, the top two pairs in the FIP rankings both reached their fourth final of the year, having already faced each other in the first two tournaments of the season, with the world number one's holding a 2–0 lead in their head-to-head record. In the final, world number 2's Ariana Sánchez and Alejandra Salazar defeated Marta Marrero and Marta Ortega in three sets, securing their second title of the season, and the first for both of them in Jaén.

In the men’s category, the top two ranked pairs also reached the final, where they faced each other for the third time in the season, with the number 1-ranked pair having won all three of their previous encounters. In the decisive match, Juan Lebrón and Paquito Navarro, playing in their fifth consecutive final, defeated Maxi Sánchez and Sanyo Gutiérrez for the first time. This secured them their second title of the season, prevented their rivals from successfully defending the title they had won the previous year, and established the pair as a threat to the number 1 ranking held by their opponents.

== Head-to-head record between teams ranked in the top 4 during the season ==
=== Men's ===
Record	Maxi–Sanyo	Belasteguín–Lima	Lebrón–Paquito	Galán–J. Mieres
Maxi–Sanyo	—	—	3–1	1–0
Belasteguín–Lima	—	—	0–5	—
Lebrón–Paquito	1–3	5–0	—	—
Galán–J. Mieres	0–1	—	—	—

=== Women's ===
Record	Marrero–Ortega	Ariana–Salazar	Triay–Sainz	Delfina–Majo
Marrero–Ortega	—	2–1	3–0	—
Ariana–Salazar	1–2	—	1–0	3–0
Triay–Sainz	0–3	0–1	—	—
Delfina–Majo	—	0–3	—	—

== Draws ==
=== Men's Bracket ===
Round of 32
1	(Argentina) Maxi / (Argentina) Sanyo
Bye
(Uruguay) D. Ramos / (Argentina) J. Restivo	6	3	4
(Argentina) F. Quiles / (Spain) J.G. Diestro	4	6	6
(Spain) J.M. Díaz / (Argentina) Tapia	6	6	6
(Brazil) F. Gomes / (Argentina) G. Tamame	7	4	1
Q	(Spain) J. Barahona / (Spain) J. Gutiérrez	4	4
(Spain) J. Ruiz / (Spain) U. Botello	6	6
(Argentina) F.Stupaczuk / (Spain) M. Díaz	6	6
Q	(Spain) F. Gil Morales / (Spain) S. Alba	1	4
(Spain) A. Santana / (Argentina) Godo Díaz	6	2
(Argentina) A. Allemandi / (Argentina) A. Silingo	7	6
(Spain) Á. Cepero / (Argentina) S. Nerone	3	4
Q	(Argentina) Di Nenno / (Spain) J. Garrido	6	6
Bye
4	(Spain) Galán / (Spain) J. Mieres
3	(Argentina) Belasteguín / (Brazil) Lima
Bye
(Spain) N. Gadea / (Spain) R. Méndez	4	4
(Spain) Coki / (Spain) J. Rico	6	6
(Argentina) F. Chingotto / (Argentina) J. Tello	6	6	3
(Argentina) F. Poggi / (Argentina) M. Grabiel	7	1	0
(Spain) J.C. Belluati / (Spain) P. Lijó	6	3	6
(Argentina) C. Gutiérrez / (Argentina) R. Moyano	4	6	7
(Argentina) L. Capra / (Argentina) M. Lamperti	6	6
(Spain) J. Rico / (Spain) V. Ruiz	4	2
Q	(Spain) R. Rivera / (Spain) T. Bueno	7	4	4
(Brazil) L. Bergamini / (Brazil) L. Campagnolo	5	6	6
(Spain) G. Rubio / (Spain) E. Moreno	4	4
(Spain) A. Ruiz / (Spain) M. Piñeiro	6	6
Bye
2	(Spain) Lebrón / (Spain) Paquito

Round of 16
1	(Argentina) Maxi / (Argentina) Sanyo	6	7
(Argentina) F. Quiles / (Spain) J.G. Diestro	3	6
(Spain) J.M. Díaz / (Argentina) Tapia
(Spain) J. Ruiz / (Spain) U. Botello	*
(Argentina) F.Stupaczuk / (Spain) M. Díaz	6	6
(Argentina) A. Allemandi / (Argentina) A. Silingo	4	3
(Argentina) Di Nenno / (Spain) J. Garrido	6	3	4
4	(Spain) Galán / (Spain) J. Mieres	4	6	6
3	(Argentina) Belasteguín / (Brazil) Lima	6	6
(Spain) Coki / (Spain) J. Rico	2	3
(Argentina) F. Chingotto / (Argentina) J. Tello	6	7
(Argentina) C. Gutiérrez / (Argentina) R. Moyano	3	6
(Argentina) L. Capra / (Argentina) M. Lamperti	6	3	6
(Brazil) L. Bergamini / (Brazil) L. Campagnolo	2	6	4
(Spain) A. Ruiz / (Spain) M. Piñeiro	5	3
2	(Spain) Lebrón / (Spain) Paquito	7	6

Quarter-Final
1	(Argentina) Maxi / (Argentina) Sanyo	7	6
(Spain) J. Ruiz / (Spain) U. Botello	5	3
(Argentina) F.Stupaczuk / (Spain) M. Díaz	6	6	6
4	(Spain) Galán / (Spain) J. Mieres	7	4	1
3	(Argentina) Belasteguín / (Brazil) Lima	7	6
(Argentina) F. Chingotto / (Argentina) J. Tello	5	4
(Argentina) L. Capra / (Argentina) M. Lamperti	6	2
2	(Spain) Lebrón / (Spain) Paquito	7	6

Semi-Finals
1	(Argentina) Maxi / (Argentina) Sanyo	7	7
(Argentina) F.Stupaczuk / (Spain) M. Díaz	6	5
3	(Argentina) Belasteguín / (Brazil) Lima	2	3
2	(Spain) Lebrón / (Spain) Paquito	6	6

Finals
1	(Argentina) Maxi / (Argentina) Sanyo	5	4
2	(Spain) Lebrón / (Spain) Paquito	7	6

=== Women's Bracket ===
Round of 32
1	(Spain) M. Marrero / (Spain) M. Ortega
Bye
(Argentina) A. Osoro / (Argentina) N. Brito	7	6
(Portugal) A.C. Nogueira / (Spain) P. Josemaría	6	2
(Spain) E. Ramírez / (Spain) M. Truchado	2	2
Q	(Uruguay) A. De los Santos / (Spain) S. Bellver	6	6
(Spain) C. Mesa / (Spain) L. Martínez	1
(Spain) C. Navarro / (Argentina) C. Reiter	2	*
(Spain) B. González / (Argentina) C. Tenorio	6	6
(Spain) M. Villalba / (Spain) T. Navarro	4	3
Q	(Spain) N. Rovira / (Brazil) R. Piltcher	6	6
(Spain) A.F. de Ossó / (Spain) S. Pujals	4	4
(Spain) A. Martinez / (Spain) M. Talavan	7	6
Q	(Spain) N. Vivancos / (Spain) T. Anillo	5	2
Bye
3	(Spain) Gemma / (Spain) L. Sainz
4	(Argentina) D. Brea / (Spain) Majo
Bye
(Spain) L. Alonso / (Spain) V. Virseda	7	4	2
(Portugal) S. Araújo / (Argentina) V. Riera	6	6	6
(Spain) I. Domínguez / (Spain) V. Alonso	3	6	3
(Spain) A. Cantin / (Spain) S. Pujals	6	3	6
(Spain) S. Hernández / (Spain) T. Icardo	4	4
(Spain) E. Amatriain / (Spain) P. Llaguno	6	6
(Spain) A. Galán / (Spain) V. Iglesias	7	6
(Spain) C. Goenaga / (Spain) N. Rodríguez	5	2
Q	(Spain) A. Cañellas / (Spain) S. Vidal	2	4
(France) A. Collombon / (Spain) N. Traviesa	6	6
(Spain) A. Blanco / (Spain) B. Caldera	7	4	6
(Spain) A. Tapia / (Spain) J. Castelló	6	6	3
Bye
2	(Spain) Ariana / (Spain) Salazar

Round of 16
1	(Spain) M. Marrero / (Spain) M. Ortega	6	6
(Argentina) A. Osoro / (Argentina) N. Brito	4	2
Q	(Uruguay) A. De los Santos / (Spain) S. Bellver	2	1
(Spain) C. Navarro / (Argentina) C. Reiter	6	6
(Spain) B. González / (Argentina) C. Tenorio	6	6
(Spain) N. Rovira / (Brazil) R. Piltcher	2	4
(Spain) A. Martinez / (Spain) M. Talavan	6	3	4
3	(Spain) Gemma / (Spain) L. Sainz	4	6	6
4	(Argentina) D. Brea / (Spain) Majo	6	6
(Portugal) S. Araújo / (Argentina) V. Riera	0	1
(Spain) A. Cantin / (Spain) S. Pujals	1	3
(Spain) E. Amatriain / (Spain) P. Llaguno	6	6
(Spain) A. Galán / (Spain) V. Iglesias	6	6
(France) A. Collombon / (Spain) N. Traviesa	1	3
(Spain) A. Blanco / (Spain) B. Caldera	1	2
2	(Spain) Ariana / (Spain) Salazar	6	6

Quarter-Final
1	(Spain) M. Marrero / (Spain) M. Ortega	6	6
(Spain) C. Navarro / (Argentina) C. Reiter	4	1
(Spain) B. González / (Argentina) C. Tenorio	0	6
3	(Spain) Gemma / (Spain) L. Sainz	6	7
4	(Argentina) D. Brea / (Spain) Majo	7	6
(Spain) E. Amatriain / (Spain) P. Llaguno	6	3
(Spain) A. Galán / (Spain) V. Iglesias	2	3
2	(Spain) Ariana / (Spain) Salazar	6	6

Semi-Finals
1	(Spain) M. Marrero / (Spain) M. Ortega	3	6	6
3	(Spain) Gemma / (Spain) L. Sainz	6	3	2
4	(Argentina) D. Brea / (Spain) Majo	6	4	3
2	(Spain) Ariana / (Spain) Salazar	3	6	6

Finals
1	(Spain) M. Marrero / (Spain) M. Ortega	5	6	5
2	(Spain) Ariana / (Spain) Salazar	7	2	7

== Results ==
=== Round of 32 ===
Men's
Date	Winners	Score	Opponent	Ref.
22/5/2019	(Argentina) Federico Quiles (Spain) José García Diestro	4–6 / 6–3 / 6–4	(Uruguay) Diego Ramos (Argentina) Juan Manuel Restivo	
22/5/2019	(Argentina) Agustín Tapia (Spain) Juan Martín Díaz	6–7 / 6–4 / 6–1	(Brazil) Francisco Gomes (Argentina) Germán Tamame	
22/5/2019	(Spain) Javi Ruiz (Spain) Uri Botello	6–4 / 6–4	(Spain) Javier Barahona (Spain) Jorge Ruiz Gutiérrez	
22/5/2019	(Argentina) Franco Stupaczuk (Spain) Matías Díaz	6–1 / 6–4	(Spain) Francisco Gil Morales (Spain) Sergio Alba Sánchez	
22/5/2019	(Argentina) Agustin Goméz Silingo (Argentina) Adrián Allemandi	7–6 / 6–2	(Spain) Aday Santana (Argentina) Godo Díaz	
22/5/2019	(Spain) Javi Garrido (Argentina) Martín Di Nenno	6–3 / 6–4	(Spain) Álvaro Cepero (Argentina) Sebastián Nerone	
22/5/2019	(Spain) Coki Nieto (Spain) Javi Rico	6–4 / 6–4	(Spain) Nacho Gadea (Spain) Rafael Méndez	
22/5/2019	(Argentina) Federico Chingotto (Argentina) Juan Tello	6–7 / 6–1 / 3–0 / W.O.	(Argentina) Fernando Poggi (Argentina) Maxi Grabiel	
22/5/2019	(Argentina) Cristian Gutiérrez (Argentina) Ramiro Moyano	4–6 / 6–3 / 7–6	(Argentina) Juan Cruz Belluati (Spain) Pablo Lijó	
22/5/2019	(Argentina) Lucho Capra (Argentina) Miguel Lamperti	6–4 / 6–2	(Spain) José Rico (Spain) Víctor Ruiz	
22/5/2019	(Brazil) Lucas Bergamini (Brazil) Lucas Campagnolo	5–7 / 6–4 / 6–4	(Spain) Rubén Rivera (Spain) Toni Bueno	
22/5/2019	(Spain) Alejandro Ruiz (Spain) Martin Sánchez Piñeiro	6–4 / 6–4	(Spain) Gonzalo Rubio (Spain) Ernesto Moreno	

Women's
Date	Winners	Score	Opponent	Ref.
22/5/2019	(Argentina) Aranzazu Osoro (Argentina) Nela Brito	7–6 / 6–2	(Portugal) Ana Catarina Nogueira (Spain) Paula Josemaría	
22/5/2019	(Uruguay) Andreína De los Santos (Spain) Sandra Bellver	6–2 / 6–2	(Spain) Elena Ramírez (Spain) Meli García Truchado	
22/5/2019	(Spain) Carolina Navarro (Argentina) Cecilia Reiter	2–1 / W.O.	(Spain) Carla Mesa (Spain) Lucía Martínez	
22/5/2019	(Spain) Beatriz González (Argentina) Catalina Tenorio	6–4 / 6–3	(Spain) Maria Villalba (Spain) Teresa Navarro	
22/5/2019	(Spain) Nuria Rovira (Brazil) Raquel Piltcher	6–4 / 6–4	(Spain) Ana Fernández de Ossó (Spain) Sara Pujals	
22/5/2019	(Spain) Araceli Martinez (Spain) Marta Talavan	7–5 / 6–2	(Spain) Nuria Vivancos (Spain) Teresa Anillo	
22/5/2019	(Portugal) Sofia Araújo (Argentina) Virginia Riera	6–7 / 6–4 / 6–2	(Spain) Lorena Alonso (Spain) Verónica Virseda	
22/5/2019	(Spain) Angela Caro Cantin (Spain) Sara Pujals	6–3 / 3–6 / 6–3	(Spain) Isabel Domínguez (Spain) Vanesa Alonso	
22/5/2019	(Spain) Elisabeth Amatriain (Spain) Patricia Llaguno	6–4 / 6–4	(Spain) Sandra Hernández (Spain) Tamara Icardo	
22/5/2019	(Spain) Alba Galán (Spain) Victoria Iglesias	7–5 / 6–2	(Spain) Carmen Goenaga (Spain) Nuria Rodríguez	
22/5/2019	(France) Alix Collombon (Spain) Nicole Traviesa Mola	6–2 / 6–4	(Spain) Ariadna Cañellas (Spain) Silvia López Vidal	
22/5/2019	(Spain) Alicia Blanco Rojo (Spain) Beatriz Caldera	7–6 / 4–6 / 6–3	(Spain) Anna Cortiles Tapia (Spain) Jessica Castelló	

=== Round of 16 ===
Men's
Date	Winners	Score	Opponent	Ref.
23/5/2019	(Argentina) Maxi Sánchez (Argentina) Sanyo Gutiérrez	6–3 / 7–6	(Argentina) Federico Quiles (Spain) José García Diestro	
23/5/2019	(Spain) Javi Ruiz (Spain) Uri Botello	W.O.	(Argentina) Agustín Tapia (Spain) Juan Martín Díaz	
23/5/2019	(Argentina) Franco Stupaczuk (Spain) Matías Díaz	6–4 / 6–3	(Argentina) Agustin Goméz Silingo (Argentina) Adrián Allemandi	
23/5/2019	(Spain) Alejandro Galán (Spain) Juani Mieres	4–6 / 6–3 / 6–4	(Spain) Javi Garrido (Argentina) Martín Di Nenno	
23/5/2019	(Argentina) Fernando Belasteguín (Brazil) Pablo Lima	6–2 / 6–3	(Spain) Coki Nieto (Spain) Javi Rico	
23/5/2019	(Argentina) Federico Chingotto (Argentina) Juan Tello	6–3 / 7–6	(Argentina) Cristian Gutiérrez (Argentina) Ramiro Moyano	
23/5/2019	(Argentina) Lucho Capra (Argentina) Miguel Lamperti	6–2 / 3–6 / 6–4	(Brazil) Lucas Bergamini (Brazil) Lucas Campagnolo	
23/5/2019	(Spain) Juan Lebrón (Spain) Paquito Navarro	7–5 / 6–3	(Spain) Alejandro Ruiz (Spain) Martin Sánchez Piñeiro	

Women's
Date	Winners	Score	Opponent	Ref.
23/5/2019	(Spain) Marta Marrero (Spain) Marta Ortega	6–4 / 6–2	(Argentina) Aranzazu Osoro (Argentina) Nela Brito	
23/5/2019	(Spain) Carolina Navarro (Argentina) Cecilia Reiter	6–2 / 6–1	(Uruguay) Andreína De los Santos (Spain) Sandra Bellver	
23/5/2019	(Spain) Beatriz González (Argentina) Catalina Tenorio	6–2 / 6–4	(Spain) Nuria Rovira (Brazil) Raquel Piltcher	
23/5/2019	(Spain) Gemma Triay (Spain) Lucía Sainz	4–6 / 6–3 / 6–4	(Spain) Araceli Martinez (Spain) Marta Talavan	
23/5/2019	(Argentina) Delfina Brea (Spain) Majo Sánchez	6–0 / 6–1	(Portugal) Sofia Araújo (Argentina) Virginia Riera	
23/5/2019	(Spain) Elisabeth Amatriain (Spain) Patricia Llaguno	6–1 / 6–3	(Spain) Angela Caro Cantin (Spain) Sara Pujals	
23/5/2019	(Spain) Alba Galán (Spain) Victoria Iglesias	6–1 / 6–3	(France) Alix Collombon (Spain) Nicole Traviesa Mola	
23/5/2019	(Spain) Alejandra Salazar (Spain) Ariana Sánchez	6–1 / 6–2	(Spain) Alicia Blanco Rojo (Spain) Beatriz Caldera	

=== Quarter-Finals ===
Men's
Date	Winners	Score	Opponent	Ref.
24/5/2019	(Argentina) Maxi Sánchez (Argentina) Sanyo Gutiérrez	7–5 / 6–3	(Spain) Javi Ruiz (Spain) Uri Botello	
24/5/2019	(Argentina) Franco Stupaczuk (Spain) Matías Díaz	6–7 / 6–4 / 6–1	(Spain) Alejandro Galán (Spain) Juani Mieres	
24/5/2019	(Argentina) Fernando Belasteguín (Brazil) Pablo Lima	7–5 / 6–4	(Argentina) Federico Chingotto (Argentina) Juan Tello	
24/5/2019	(Spain) Juan Lebrón (Spain) Paquito Navarro	7–6 / 6–2	(Argentina) Lucho Capra (Argentina) Miguel Lamperti	

Women's
Date	Winners	Score	Opponent	Ref.
24/5/2019	(Spain) Marta Marrero (Spain) Marta Ortega	6–4 / 6–1	(Spain) Carolina Navarro (Argentina) Cecilia Reiter	
24/5/2019	(Spain) Gemma Triay (Spain) Lucía Sainz	6–0 / 7–6	(Spain) Beatriz González (Argentina) Catalina Tenorio	
24/5/2019	(Argentina) Delfina Brea (Spain) Majo Sánchez	7–6 / 6–3	(Spain) Elisabeth Amatriain (Spain) Patricia Llaguno	
24/5/2019	(Spain) Alejandra Salazar (Spain) Ariana Sánchez	6–2 / 6–3	(Spain) Alba Galán (Spain) Victoria Iglesias	

=== Semi-Finals ===
Men's
Date	Winners	Score	Opponent	Ref.
25/5/2019	(Argentina) Maxi Sánchez (Argentina) Sanyo Gutiérrez	7–6 / 7–5	(Argentina) Franco Stupaczuk (Spain) Matías Díaz	
25/5/2019	(Spain) Juan Lebrón (Spain) Paquito Navarro	6–2 / 6–3	(Argentina) Fernando Belasteguín (Brazil) Pablo Lima	

Women's
Date	Winners	Score	Opponent	Ref.
25/5/2019	(Spain) Marta Marrero (Spain) Marta Ortega	3–6 / 6–3 / 6–2	(Spain) Gemma Triay (Spain) Lucía Sainz	
25/5/2019	(Spain) Alejandra Salazar (Spain) Ariana Sánchez	3–6 / 6–4 / 6–3	(Argentina) Delfina Brea (Spain) Majo Sánchez	

=== Finals ===
Men's
Date	Winners	Score	Opponent	Ref.
26/5/2019	(Spain) Juan Lebrón (Spain) Paquito Navarro	7–5 / 6–4	(Argentina) Maxi Sánchez (Argentina) Sanyo Gutiérrez	

Women's
Date	Winners	Score	Opponent	Ref.
26/5/2019	(Spain) Alejandra Salazar (Spain) Ariana Sánchez	7–5 / 2–6 / 7–5	(Spain) Marta Marrero (Spain) Marta Ortega	
