= 2019 WPT Logroño Open =

World Padel Tour tournament held in Logroño, Spain

- Date: 7 – 14 April
- Edition: 7th (Note: The first six editions were held under the organization of the Padel Pro Tour, with four of them under the name of La Rioja Open.)
- Category: Open
- Location: Logroño, Spain
- Venue: Palacio de los Deportes de La Rioja

Champions
- Men's doubles: (Argentina) Maxi Sánchez (Argentina) Sanyo Gutiérrez
- Women's doubles: (Spain) Marta Marrero (Spain) Marta Ortega

Chronology

The 2019 Logroño Open (officially 2019 World Padel Tour Trofeo Ciudad de Logroño Open) was the second tournament of the seventh season organized by World Padel Tour, the most prestigious padel circuit at the time.

In the women's category, the final from the previous tournament was repeated, with the two top-ranked pairs in FIP rankings reaching the final match. The outcome of the previous tournament was also repeated, as the world number one pair, (the "Martas") Marta Marrero and Marta Ortega, defeated their former partners, the second-ranked duo of Ariana Sánchez and Alejandra Salazar, in three sets. This victory secured their second title of the season and made them the first female players to win a title in the La Rioja region.

In the men's category, the results were also similar to those of the previous tournament, with world number 1s Maxi Sánchez and Sanyo Gutiérrez reaching the final, and with their opponents being, the world number 3 pair, Juan Lebrón and Paquito Navarro, who reached their second consecutive final after eliminating the second-ranked pair, Fernando Belasteguín and Pablo Lima, in the semifinals. In the decisive match, the world number 1s defeated Lebrón and Navarro in straight sets, both decided by tiebreaks, securing their second title of the season. This marked their first title as a pair in Logroño (and the second for Gutiérrez, who had previously won there in 2012).

== Head-to-head record between teams ranked in the top 4 during the season ==
=== Men's ===
Record	Maxi–Sanyo	Belasteguín–Lima	Lebrón–Paquito	Galán–J. Mieres
Maxi–Sanyo	—	—	2–0	1–0
Belasteguín–Lima	—	—	0–2	—
Lebrón–Paquito	0–2	2–0	—	—
Galán–J. Mieres	0–1	—	—	—

=== Women's ===
Record	Marrero–Ortega	Ariana–Salazar	Triay–Sainz	Delfina–Majo
Marrero–Ortega	—	2–0	1–0	—
Ariana–Salazar	0–2	—	—	1–0
Triay–Sainz	0–1	—	—	—
Delfina–Majo	—	0–1	—	—

== Draws ==
=== Men's Bracket ===
Round of 32
1	(Argentina) Maxi / (Argentina) Sanyo
Bye
Q	(Portugal) M. Oliveira / (Spain) W. Lahoz	0	4
(Spain) Á. Cepero / (Argentina) S. Nerone	6	6
(Spain) A. Santana / (Argentina) Godo Díaz	6	3	6
(Argentina) F. Poggi / (Argentina) M. Grabiel	3	6	7
Q	(Spain) M. Solbes / (Spain) J. Gutiérrez	3	2
7	(Argentina) C. Gutiérrez / (Argentina) R. Moyano	6	6
6	(Argentina) L. Capra / (Argentina) M. Lamperti	6	6
(Brazil) F. Gomes / (Argentina) G. Tamame	3	2
(Argentina) F. Quiles / (Spain) J.G. Diestro	4	3
(Argentina) F. Chingotto / (Argentina) J. Tello	6	6
(Spain) J.C. Belluati / (Spain) P. Lijó	6	3	6
(Spain) A. Ruiz / (Spain) M. Piñeiro	4	6	3
Bye
4	(Spain) Galán / (Spain) J. Mieres
3	(Spain) Lebrón / (Spain) Paquito
Bye
(Spain) Coki / (Spain) J. Rico	6	6
(Brazil) L. Bergamini / (Brazil) L. Campagnolo	7	7
(Spain) N. Gadea / (Spain) R. Méndez	7	6	1
Q	(Spain) A. Blanco / (Spain) J. Vazquez	5	7	6
(Spain) J. Rico / (Spain) V. Ruiz	3	4
8	(Spain) J.M. Díaz / (Argentina) Tapia	6	6
5	(Spain) J. Ruiz / (Spain) U. Botello	6	6
Q	(Argentina) J. Vazquez / (Brazil) M. Jardim	1	1
(Argentina) F. Stupaczuk / (Spain) J. Barahona	6	6
(Argentina) A. Patiniotis / (Spain) J. Muñoz	3	3
(Argentina) A. Allemandi / (Argentina) A. Silingo	7	4	2
(Spain) G. Rubio / (Spain) E. Moreno	5	6	6
Bye
2	(Argentina) Belasteguín / (Brazil) Lima

Round of 16
1	(Argentina) Maxi / (Argentina) Sanyo	7	6
(Spain) Á. Cepero / (Argentina) S. Nerone	5	4
(Argentina) F. Poggi / (Argentina) M. Grabiel	1	0
7	(Argentina) C. Gutiérrez / (Argentina) R. Moyano	6	6
6	(Argentina) L. Capra / (Argentina) M. Lamperti	4	2
(Argentina) F. Chingotto / (Argentina) J. Tello	6	6
(Spain) J.C. Belluati / (Spain) P. Lijó	3	6	6
4	(Spain) Galán / (Spain) J. Mieres	6	2	4
3	(Spain) Lebrón / (Spain) Paquito	6	6
(Brazil) L. Bergamini / (Brazil) L. Campagnolo	2	1
Q	(Spain) A. Blanco / (Spain) J. Vazquez	3	2
8	(Spain) J.M. Díaz / (Argentina) Tapia	6	6
5	(Spain) J. Ruiz / (Spain) U. Botello	3	4
(Argentina) F. Stupaczuk / (Spain) J. Barahona	6	6
(Spain) G. Rubio / (Spain) E. Moreno	2	6	6
2	(Argentina) Belasteguín / (Brazil) Lima	6	3	7

Quarter-Final
1	(Argentina) Maxi / (Argentina) Sanyo	6	3	6
7	(Argentina) C. Gutiérrez / (Argentina) R. Moyano	1	6	2
(Argentina) F. Chingotto / (Argentina) J. Tello	6	6
(Spain) J.C. Belluati / (Spain) P. Lijó	3	3
3	(Spain) Lebrón / (Spain) Paquito	4	6	6
8	(Spain) J.M. Díaz / (Argentina) Tapia	6	3	3
(Argentina) F. Stupaczuk / (Spain) J. Barahona	3	3
2	(Argentina) Belasteguín / (Brazil) Lima	6	6

Semi-Finals
1	(Argentina) Maxi / (Argentina) Sanyo	6	6
(Argentina) F. Chingotto / (Argentina) J. Tello	2	2
3	(Spain) Lebrón / (Spain) Paquito	6	7
2	(Argentina) Belasteguín / (Brazil) Lima	3	6

Finals
1	(Argentina) Maxi / (Argentina) Sanyo	7	7
3	(Spain) Lebrón / (Spain) Paquito	6	6

=== Women's Bracket ===
Round of 32
1	(Spain) M. Marrero / (Spain) M. Ortega
Bye
(France) A. Collombon / (Spain) N. Traviesa	2	4
(Portugal) A.C. Nogueira / (Spain) P. Josemaría	6	6
(Spain) A. Cantin / (Spain) S. Ruiz	6	6	5
(Spain) A. Tapia / (Spain) J. Castelló	7	3	7
(Spain) C. Mesa / (Spain) L. Martínez	6	3	4
(Spain) B. González / (Argentina) C. Tenorio	4	6	6
(Spain) C. Navarro / (Argentina) C. Reiter	6	6	5
(Argentina) A. Osoro / (Argentina) N. Brito	7	4	7
(Spain) E. Ramírez / (Spain) M. Truchado	6	4
(Spain) I. Domínguez / (Spain) V. Alonso	7	6
(Spain) L. Alonso / (Spain) V. Virseda	6	4	6
Q	(Venezuela) A.S. Cali / (Argentina) C. Paz	2	6	1
Bye
3	(Spain) Gemma / (Spain) L. Sainz
4	(Argentina) D. Brea / (Spain) Majo
Bye
Q	(Spain) R. Aguilar / (Spain) X. Clasca	1	6	2
(Spain) M. Villalba / (Spain) T. Navarro	6	4	6
(Spain) S. Hernández / (Spain) T. Icardo	6	6
Q	(Spain) A. Cañellas / (Spain) N. Vivancos	2	0
(Spain) C. Goenaga / (Spain) N. Rodríguez	0	2
(Spain) E. Amatriain / (Spain) P. Llaguno	6	6
(Spain) A. Galán / (Spain) V. Iglesias	6	6
(Spain) A.F. de Ossó / (Spain) S. Pujals	4	0
(Spain) A. Martinez / (Spain) M. Talavan	6	1	3
(Portugal) S. Araújo / (Argentina) V. Riera	4	6	6
(Spain) A. Blanco / (Spain) B. Caldera	6	6
(Spain) E. Carnicero / (Spain) M. Merin	2	2
Bye
2	(Spain) Ariana / (Spain) Salazar

Round of 16
1	(Spain) M. Marrero / (Spain) M. Ortega	6	6
(Portugal) A.C. Nogueira / (Spain) P. Josemaría	2	1
(Spain) A. Tapia / (Spain) J. Castelló	1	1
(Spain) B. González / (Argentina) C. Tenorio	6	6
(Argentina) A. Osoro / (Argentina) N. Brito	6	6
(Spain) I. Domínguez / (Spain) V. Alonso	0	1
(Spain) L. Alonso / (Spain) V. Virseda	1	1
3	(Spain) Gemma / (Spain) L. Sainz	6	6
4	(Argentina) D. Brea / (Spain) Majo	6	6
(Spain) M. Villalba / (Spain) T. Navarro	3	2
(Spain) S. Hernández / (Spain) T. Icardo	4	2
(Spain) E. Amatriain / (Spain) P. Llaguno	6	6
(Spain) A. Galán / (Spain) V. Iglesias	6	6
(Portugal) S. Araújo / (Argentina) V. Riera	3	1
(Spain) A. Blanco / (Spain) B. Caldera	4	1
2	(Spain) Ariana / (Spain) Salazar	6	6

Quarter-Final
1	(Spain) M. Marrero / (Spain) M. Ortega	6	6
(Spain) B. González / (Argentina) C. Tenorio	3	1
(Argentina) A. Osoro / (Argentina) N. Brito	6	6	3
3	(Spain) Gemma / (Spain) L. Sainz	7	3	6
4	(Argentina) D. Brea / (Spain) Majo	6	4	6
(Spain) E. Amatriain / (Spain) P. Llaguno	4	6	7
(Spain) A. Galán / (Spain) V. Iglesias	2	0
2	(Spain) Ariana / (Spain) Salazar	6	6

Semi-Finals
1	(Spain) M. Marrero / (Spain) M. Ortega	6	6
3	(Spain) Gemma / (Spain) L. Sainz	1	0
(Spain) E. Amatriain / (Spain) P. Llaguno	6	3	4
2	(Spain) Ariana / (Spain) Salazar	1	6	6

Finals
1	(Spain) M. Marrero / (Spain) M. Ortega	3	7	6
2	(Spain) Ariana / (Spain) Salazar	6	5	3

== Results ==
=== Round of 32 ===
Men's
Date	Winners	Score	Opponent	Ref.
10/4/2019	(Spain) Álvaro Cepero (Argentina) Sebastián Nerone	6–0 / 6–4	(Portugal) Miguel Oliveira (Spain) Willy Lahoz	
10/4/2019	(Argentina) Fernando Poggi (Argentina) Maxi Grabiel	3–6 / 6–3 / 7–6	(Spain) Aday Santana (Argentina) Godo Díaz	
10/4/2019	(Argentina) Cristian Gutiérrez (Argentina) Ramiro Moyano	6–3 / 6–2	(Spain) Jorge Ruiz Gutiérrez (Spain) Miguel Solbes	
10/4/2019	(Argentina) Lucho Capra (Argentina) Miguel Lamperti	6–3 / 6–2	(Brazil) Francisco Chico Gomes (Argentina) Germán Tamame	
10/4/2019	(Argentina) Federico Chingotto (Argentina) Juan Tello	6–4 / 6–3	(Argentina) Federico Quiles (Spain) José García Diestro	
10/4/2019	(Argentina) Juan Cruz Belluati (Spain) Pablo Lijó	6–4 / 3–6 / 6–3	(Spain) Alejandro Ruiz (Spain) Martin Sánchez Piñeiro	
10/4/2019	(Brazil) Lucas Bergamini (Brazil) Lucas Campagnolo	7–6 / 7–6	(Spain) Coki Nieto (Spain) Javi Rico	
10/4/2019	(Spain) Adrián Blanco (Spain) Javier Martinez Vazquez	5–7 / 7–6 / 6–1	(Spain) Nacho Gadea (Spain) Rafael Méndez	
10/4/2019	(Argentina) Agustín Tapia (Spain) Juan Martín Díaz	6–3 / 6–4	(Spain) José Rico (Spain) Víctor Ruiz	
10/4/2019	(Spain) Javi Ruiz (Spain) Uri Botello	6–1 / 6–1	(Argentina) Juan Manuel Vazquez (Brazil) Marcello Jardim	
10/4/2019	(Argentina) Franco Stupaczuk (Spain) Javier Barahona	6–3 / 6–3	(Argentina) Aris Patiniotis (Spain) Jordi Muñoz	
10/4/2019	(Spain) Gonzalo Rubio (Spain) Ernesto Moreno	5–7 / 6–4 / 6–2	(Argentina) Agustin Goméz Silingo (Argentina) Adrián Allemandi	

Women's
Date	Winners	Score	Opponent	Ref.
10/4/2019	(Portugal) Ana Catarina Nogueira (Spain) Paula Josemaría	6–2 / 6–4	(France) Alix Collombon (Spain) Nicole Traviesa Mola	
10/4/2019	(Spain) Anna Cortiles Tapia (Spain) Jessica Castelló	7–6 / 3–6 / 7–5	(Spain) Angela Caro Cantin (Spain) Sara Ruiz	
10/4/2019	(Spain) Beatriz González (Argentina) Catalina Tenorio	4–6 / 6–3 / 6–4	(Spain) Carla Mesa (Spain) Lucía Martínez	
10/4/2019	(Argentina) Aranzazu Osoro (Argentina) Nela Brito	7–6 / 4–6 / 7–5	(Spain) Carolina Navarro (Argentina) Cecilia Reiter	
10/4/2019	(Spain) Isabel Domínguez (Spain) Vanesa Alonso	7–6 / 6–4	(Spain) Elena Ramírez (Spain) Meli García Truchado	
10/4/2019	(Spain) Lorena Alonso (Spain) Verónica Virseda	6–2 / 4–6 / 6–1	(Venezuela) Ana Seijas Cali (Argentina) Celeste Paz	
10/4/2019	(Spain) Maria Villalba (Spain) Teresa Navarro	6–1 / 4–6 / 6–2	(Spain) Raquel Segura Aguilar (Spain) Xenia Clasca	
10/4/2019	(Spain) Sandra Hernández (Spain) Tamara Icardo	6–2 / 6–0	(Spain) Ariadna Cañellas (Spain) Nuria Vivancos	
10/4/2019	(Spain) Elisabeth Amatriain (Spain) Patricia Llaguno	6–0 / 6–2	(Spain) Carmen Goenaga (Spain) Nuria Rodríguez	
10/4/2019	(Spain) Alba Galán (Spain) Victoria Iglesias	6–4 / 6–0	(Spain) Ana Fernández de Ossó (Spain) Sara Pujals	
10/4/2019	(Portugal) Sofia Araújo (Argentina) Virginia Riera	4–6 / 6–1 / 6–3	(Spain) Araceli Martinez (Spain) Marta Talavan	
10/4/2019	(Spain) Alicia Blanco Rojo (Spain) Beatriz Caldera	6–2 / 6–2	(Spain) Esther Carnicero (Spain) Melania Merino	

=== Round of 16 ===
Men's
Date	Winners	Score	Opponent	Ref.
11/4/2019	(Argentina) Maxi Sánchez (Argentina) Sanyo Gutiérrez	7–5 / 6–4	(Spain) Álvaro Cepero (Argentina) Sebastián Nerone	
11/4/2019	(Argentina) Cristian Gutiérrez (Argentina) Ramiro Moyano	6–1 / 6–0	(Argentina) Fernando Poggi (Argentina) Maxi Grabiel	
11/4/2019	(Argentina) Federico Chingotto (Argentina) Juan Tello	6–4 / 6–2	(Argentina) Lucho Capra (Argentina) Miguel Lamperti	
11/4/2019	(Argentina) Juan Cruz Belluati (Spain) Pablo Lijó	3–6 / 6–2 / 6–4	(Spain) Alejandro Galán (Spain) Juani Mieres	
11/4/2019	(Spain) Juan Lebrón (Spain) Paquito Navarro	6–2 / 6–1	(Brazil) Lucas Bergamini (Brazil) Lucas Campagnolo	
11/4/2019	(Argentina) Agustín Tapia (Spain) Juan Martín Díaz	6–3 / 6–2	(Spain) Adrián Blanco (Spain) Javier Martinez Vazquez	
11/4/2019	(Argentina) Franco Stupaczuk (Spain) Javier Barahona	6–3 / 6–4	(Spain) Javi Ruiz (Spain) Uri Botello	
11/4/2019	(Argentina) Fernando Belasteguín (Brazil) Pablo Lima	6–2 / 3–6 / 7–6	(Spain) Gonzalo Rubio (Spain) Ernesto Moreno	

Women's
Date	Winners	Score	Opponent	Ref.
11/4/2019	(Spain) Marta Marrero (Spain) Marta Ortega	6–2 / 6–1	(Portugal) Ana Catarina Nogueira (Spain) Paula Josemaría	
11/4/2019	(Spain) Beatriz González (Argentina) Catalina Tenorio	6–1 / 6–1	(Spain) Anna Cortiles Tapia (Spain) Jessica Castelló	
11/4/2019	(Argentina) Aranzazu Osoro (Argentina) Nela Brito	6–0 / 6–1	(Spain) Isabel Domínguez (Spain) Vanesa Alonso	
11/4/2019	(Spain) Gemma Triay (Spain) Lucía Sainz	6–1 / 6–1	(Spain) Lorena Alonso (Spain) Verónica Virseda	
11/4/2019	(Argentina) Delfina Brea (Spain) Majo Sánchez	6–3 / 6–2	(Spain) Maria Villalba (Spain) Teresa Navarro	
11/4/2019	(Spain) Elisabeth Amatriain (Spain) Patricia Llaguno	6–4 / 6–2	(Spain) Sandra Hernández (Spain) Tamara Icardo	
11/4/2019	(Spain) Alba Galán (Spain) Victoria Iglesias	6–3 / 6–1	(Portugal) Sofia Araújo (Argentina) Virginia Riera	
11/4/2019	(Spain) Alejandra Salazar (Spain) Ariana Sánchez	6–4 / 6–1	(Spain) Alicia Blanco Rojo (Spain) Beatriz Caldera	

=== Quarter-Finals ===
Men's
Date	Winners	Score	Opponent	Ref.
12/4/2019	(Argentina) Maxi Sánchez (Argentina) Sanyo Gutiérrez	6–1 / 3–6 / 6–2	(Argentina) Cristian Gutiérrez (Argentina) Ramiro Moyano	
12/4/2019	(Argentina) Federico Chingotto (Argentina) Juan Tello	6–3 / 6–3	(Argentina) Juan Cruz Belluati (Spain) Pablo Lijó	
12/4/2019	(Spain) Juan Lebrón (Spain) Paquito Navarro	4–6 / 6–3 / 6–3	(Argentina) Agustín Tapia (Spain) Juan Martín Díaz	
12/4/2019	(Argentina) Fernando Belasteguín (Brazil) Pablo Lima	6–3 / 6–3	(Argentina) Franco Stupaczuk (Spain) Javier Barahona	

Women's
Date	Winners	Score	Opponent	Ref.
12/4/2019	(Spain) Marta Marrero (Spain) Marta Ortega	6–3 / 6–1	(Spain) Beatriz González (Argentina) Catalina Tenorio	
12/4/2019	(Spain) Gemma Triay (Spain) Lucía Sainz	7–6 / 3–6 / 6–3	(Argentina) Aranzazu Osoro (Argentina) Nela Brito	
12/4/2019	(Spain) Elisabeth Amatriain (Spain) Patricia Llaguno	4–6 / 6–4 / 7–6	(Argentina) Delfina Brea (Spain) Majo Sánchez	
12/4/2019	(Spain) Alejandra Salazar (Spain) Ariana Sánchez	6–2 / 6–0	(Spain) Alba Galán (Spain) Victoria Iglesias	

=== Semi-Finals ===
Men's
Date	Winners	Score	Opponent	Ref.
13/4/2019	(Argentina) Maxi Sánchez (Argentina) Sanyo Gutiérrez	6–2 / 6–2	(Argentina) Federico Chingotto (Argentina) Juan Tello	
13/4/2019	(Spain) Juan Lebrón (Spain) Paquito Navarro	6–3 / 7–6	(Argentina) Fernando Belasteguín (Brazil) Pablo Lima	

Women's
Date	Winners	Score	Opponent	Ref.
13/4/2019	(Spain) Marta Marrero (Spain) Marta Ortega	6–1 / 6–0	(Spain) Gemma Triay (Spain) Lucía Sainz	
13/4/2019	(Spain) Alejandra Salazar (Spain) Ariana Sánchez	1–6 / 6–3 / 6–4	(Spain) Elisabeth Amatriain (Spain) Patricia Llaguno	

=== Finals ===
Men's
Date	Winners	Score	Opponent	Ref.
14/4/2019	(Argentina) Maxi Sánchez (Argentina) Sanyo Gutiérrez	7–6 / 7–6	(Spain) Juan Lebrón (Spain) Paquito Navarro	

Women's
Date	Winners	Score	Opponent	Ref.
14/4/2019	(Spain) Marta Marrero (Spain) Marta Ortega	3–6 / 7–5 / 6–3	(Spain) Alejandra Salazar (Spain) Ariana Sánchez	
