= 2019 WPT Swedish Open =

World Padel Tour tournament held in Båstad, Swedish

- Date: 25 – 30 June
- Edition: 2nd
- Category: Open
- Location: (Sweden) Båstad, Swedish
- Venue: Båstad Tennis Stadium

Champions
- Men's doubles: (Spain) Juan Lebrón (Spain) Paquito Navarro
- Women's doubles: (Spain) Marta Marrero (Spain) Marta Ortega

Chronology

The 2019 Swedish Open (officially 2019 World Padel Tour Euro Finans Swedish Padel Open) was the eight tournament of the seventh season organized by World Padel Tour, the most prestigious padel circuit at the time.

In the women's category, the tournament's biggest surprise came when Ana Catarina Nogueira and Paula Josemaria eliminated the second-ranked pair, Alejandra Salazar and Ariana Sánchez, in the semi-finals. This achievement marked the first time either player had reached a final in her career, with Nogueira becoming the first Portuguese athlete to ever reach a major tournament final. Their finals opponents were the world's number one pair, Marta Marrero and Marta Ortega, who were making their sixth final appearance of the season. In the final, Marrero and Ortega defeated Nogueira and Josemaria with ease, securing their fourth title of the season and becoming the first female athletes to win a title on Swedish soil.

In the men's category, the second-ranked pair reached their seventh final of the season (out of eight possible), where they faced the fourth-seeded team, Franco Stupaczuk and Matías Díaz, who were making their first finals appearance of the year. In the final, Juan Lebrón and Paquito Navarro defeated Díaz and Stupaczuk in straight sets, securing their fourth title as a pair this season and the first for both of them on Swedish soil.

== Head-to-head record between teams ranked in the top 4 during the season ==
=== Men's ===
Record	Maxi–Sanyo	Lebrón–Paquito	Galán–J. Mieres	Díaz–Stupaczuk	Former Pairs	Belasteguín–Lima
Maxi–Sanyo	—	3–1	1–1	2–0		—
Lebrón–Paquito	1–3	—	2–0	2–1		5–0
Galán–J. Mieres	1–1	0–2	—	0–2		1–0
Díaz–Stupaczuk	0–2	1–2	2–0	—		0–1
Former Pairs
Belasteguín–Lima	—	0–5	0–1	1–0		—

=== Women's ===
Record	Marrero–Ortega	Ariana–Salazar	Triay–Sainz	Delfina–Majo
Marrero–Ortega	—	2–2	3–0	2–0
Ariana–Salazar	2–2	—	2–0	3–0
Triay–Sainz	0–3	0–2	—	—
Delfina–Majo	0–2	0–3	—	—

== Draws ==
=== Men's Bracket ===
Round of 32
1	(Argentina) Maxi / (Argentina) Sanyo
Bye
Q	(Spain) A. Blanco / (Spain) J. Martinez	6	6
(Sweden) C. Knutsson / (Spain) C. Cabeza	4	4
(Spain) J.C. Belluati / (Spain) P. Lijó	6	6
LL	(Spain) J. Barahona / (Spain) J. Gutiérrez	2	2
(Argentina) F. Quiles / (Spain) J.G. Diestro	5	2
(Spain) J. Ruiz / (Spain) U. Botello	7	6
(Argentina) A. Allemandi / (Argentina) A. Silingo	6	7
Q	(Spain) J. Muñoz / (Argentina) Tapia	3	5
(Sweden) D. Windahl / (Sweden) S. Vasquez	4	2
(Brazil) L. Bergamini / (Brazil) L. Campagnolo	6	6
(Argentina) F. Poggi / (Argentina) M. Grabiel	2	4
LL	(Spain) A. Sans / (Spain) M. Del Castillo
Bye
4	(Argentina) F. Stupaczuk / (Spain) M. Díaz
3	(Spain) Galán / (Spain) J. Mieres
Bye
Q	(Argentina) M. Marina / (Spain) Momo	6	5	3
(Argentina) Di Nenno / (Spain) J. Garrido	4	7	6
(Argentina) F. Chingotto / (Argentina) J. Tello	4	6	6
(Spain) G. Rubio / (Spain) E. Moreno	6	1	2
(Spain) N. Gadea / (Spain) R. Méndez	6	6
(Argentina) C. Gutiérrez / (Argentina) R. Moyano	0	3
(Argentina) L. Capra / (Argentina) M. Lamperti	3	6	6
(Spain) A. Ruiz / (Spain) M. Piñeiro	6	3	4
Q	(Spain) R. Rivera / (Spain) T. Bueno	3	6	6
(Uruguay) D. Ramos / (Argentina) J. Restivo	6	1	3
(Spain) Coki / (Spain) J. Rico	4	3
(Spain) J. Rico / (Spain) V. Ruiz	6	6
Bye
2	(Spain) Lebrón / (Spain) Paquito

Round of 16
1	(Argentina) Maxi / (Argentina) Sanyo	3	6
Q	(Spain) A. Blanco / (Spain) J. Martinez	6	7
(Spain) J.C. Belluati / (Spain) P. Lijó	3	4
(Spain) J. Ruiz / (Spain) U. Botello	6	6
(Argentina) A. Allemandi / (Argentina) A. Silingo	6	5	*
(Brazil) L. Bergamini / (Brazil) L. Campagnolo	4	3
LL	(Spain) A. Sans / (Spain) M. Del Castillo	1	2
4	(Argentina) F. Stupaczuk / (Spain) M. Díaz	6	6
3	(Spain) Galán / (Spain) J. Mieres	6	6
(Argentina) Di Nenno / (Spain) J. Garrido	4	2
(Argentina) F. Chingotto / (Argentina) J. Tello	6	6	6
(Spain) N. Gadea / (Spain) R. Méndez	4	7	4
(Argentina) L. Capra / (Argentina) M. Lamperti	3	7	6
Q	(Spain) R. Rivera / (Spain) T. Bueno	6	6	0
(Spain) J. Rico / (Spain) V. Ruiz	1	4
2	(Spain) Lebrón / (Spain) Paquito	6	6

Quarter-Final
Q	(Spain) A. Blanco / (Spain) J. Martinez	3	3
(Spain) J. Ruiz / (Spain) U. Botello	6	6
(Argentina) A. Allemandi / (Argentina) A. Silingo	3	2
4	(Argentina) F. Stupaczuk / (Spain) M. Díaz	6	6
3	(Spain) Galán / (Spain) J. Mieres	7	7
(Argentina) F. Chingotto / (Argentina) J. Tello	6	6
(Argentina) L. Capra / (Argentina) M. Lamperti	5	1
2	(Spain) Lebrón / (Spain) Paquito	7	6

Semi-Finals
(Spain) J. Ruiz / (Spain) U. Botello	7	2	6
4	(Argentina) F. Stupaczuk / (Spain) M. Díaz	6	6	7
4	(Spain) Galán / (Spain) J. Mieres	5	2
2	(Spain) Lebrón / (Spain) Paquito	7	6

Finals
4	(Argentina) F. Stupaczuk / (Spain) M. Díaz	3	6
2	(Spain) Lebrón / (Spain) Paquito	6	7

=== Women's Bracket ===
Round of 32
1	(Spain) M. Marrero / (Spain) M. Ortega
Bye
(Spain) N. Vivancos / (Sweden) S. Arvidsson	4	3
Q	(Spain) E. Carnicero / (Spain) M. Merino	6	6
(Spain) L. Martínez / (Spain) T. Navarro	6	6
(Spain) A.F. de Ossó / (Spain) S. Ruiz	1	4
Q	(Spain) J. Bautista / (Spain) N. Márquez	3	1
(Spain) B. González / (Argentina) C. Tenorio	6	6
(Spain) C. Navarro / (Argentina) C. Reiter	6	7
(Spain) A. Martinez / (Spain) M. Talavan	1	5
(Spain) I. Domínguez / (Spain) V. Alonso	5	1
(Spain) S. Hernández / (Spain) T. Icardo	7	6
Q	(Spain) A. Tapia / (Spain) J. Castelló	6	7
Q	(Argentina) C. Paz / (Spain) E. Frances	3	6
Bye
4	(Argentina) D. Brea / (Spain) Majo
3	(Spain) Gemma / (Spain) L. Sainz
Bye
(France) A. Collombon / (Spain) N. Traviesa	1	6	2
(Spain) M. Villalba / (Spain) V. Virseda	6	4	6
(Portugal) A.C. Nogueira / (Spain) P. Josemaría	6	6	6
(Portugal) S. Araújo / (Argentina) V. Riera	7	4	2
(Argentina) A. Osoro / (Argentina) N. Brito	7	6
(Spain) A. Galán / (Spain) V. Iglesias	6	2
(Spain) E. Amatriain / (Spain) P. Llaguno	6	6
(Spain) A. Cantin / (Spain) S. Pujals	2	2
(Sweden) A. Andersson / (Sweden) B. Soleymani	4	7	2
(Spain) A. Blanco / (Spain) B. Caldera	6	5	6
(Spain) C. Goenaga / (Spain) N. Rodríguez	5	6	3
(Spain) C. Mesa / (Spain) L. Alonso	7	2	6
Bye
2	(Spain) Ariana / (Spain) Salazar

Round of 16
1	(Spain) M. Marrero / (Spain) M. Ortega	6	6
Q	(Spain) E. Carnicero / (Spain) M. Merino	2	2
(Spain) L. Martínez / (Spain) T. Navarro	6	6
(Spain) B. González / (Argentina) C. Tenorio	3	2
(Spain) C. Navarro / (Argentina) C. Reiter	6	6
(Spain) S. Hernández / (Spain) T. Icardo	4	2
(Spain) A. Tapia / (Spain) J. Castelló	1	1
4	(Argentina) D. Brea / (Spain) Majo	6	6
3	(Spain) Gemma / (Spain) L. Sainz	4	6	6
(Spain) M. Villalba / (Spain) V. Virseda	6	3	2
(Portugal) A.C. Nogueira / (Spain) P. Josemaría	6	6
(Argentina) A. Osoro / (Argentina) N. Brito	4	2
(Spain) E. Amatriain / (Spain) P. Llaguno	6	6
(Spain) A. Blanco / (Spain) B. Caldera	1	3
(Spain) C. Mesa / (Spain) L. Alonso	3	4
2	(Spain) Ariana / (Spain) Salazar	6	6

Quarter-Final
1	(Spain) M. Marrero / (Spain) M. Ortega	6	7
(Spain) L. Martínez / (Spain) T. Navarro	1	5
(Spain) C. Navarro / (Argentina) C. Reiter	2	6
4	(Argentina) D. Brea / (Spain) Majo	6	7
3	(Spain) Gemma / (Spain) L. Sainz
(Portugal) A.C. Nogueira / (Spain) P. Josemaría	*
(Spain) E. Amatriain / (Spain) P. Llaguno	7	0	6
2	(Spain) Ariana / (Spain) Salazar	5	6	7

Semi-Finals
1	(Spain) M. Marrero / (Spain) M. Ortega	5	6	6
4	(Argentina) D. Brea / (Spain) Majo	7	2	2
(Portugal) A.C. Nogueira / (Spain) P. Josemaría	6	3	6
2	(Spain) Ariana / (Spain) Salazar	4	6	3

Finals
1	(Spain) M. Marrero / (Spain) M. Ortega	6	6
(Portugal) A.C. Nogueira / (Spain) P. Josemaría	2	1

== Results ==
=== Round of 32 ===
Men's
Date	Winners	Score	Opponent	Ref.
26/6/2019	(Spain) Adrián Blanco (Spain) Javier Martinez Vazquez	6–4 / 6–4	(Sweden) Carl Knutsson (Spain) Carlos Perez Cabeza	
26/6/2019	(Argentina) Juan Cruz Belluati (Spain) Pablo Lijó	6–2 / 6–2	(Spain) Javier Barahona (Spain) Jorge Ruiz Gutiérrez	
26/6/2019	(Spain) Javi Ruiz (Spain) Uri Botello	7–5 / 6–2	(Argentina) Federico Quiles (Spain) José García Diestro	
26/6/2019	(Argentina) Agustin Goméz Silingo (Argentina) Adrián Allemandi	6–3 / 7–5	(Argentina) Agustín Tapia (Spain) Jordi Muñoz	
26/6/2019	(Brazil) Lucas Bergamini (Brazil) Lucas Campagnolo	6–4 / 6–2	(Sweden) Daniel Windahl (Sweden) Simón Vasquez	
26/6/2019	(Spain) Anton Sans (Spain) Mario Del Castillo	6–2 / 6–4	(Argentina) Fernando Poggi (Argentina) Maxi Grabiel	
26/6/2019	(Spain) Javi Garrido (Argentina) Martín Di Nenno	4–6 / 7–5 / 6–3	(Argentina) Matías Marina Artusa (Spain) Momo González	
26/6/2019	(Argentina) Federico Chingotto (Argentina) Juan Tello	4–6 / 6–1 / 6–2	(Spain) Gonzalo Rubio (Spain) Ernesto Moreno	
26/6/2019	(Spain) Nacho Gadea (Spain) Rafael Méndez	6–0 / 6–3	(Argentina) Cristian Gutiérrez (Argentina) Ramiro Moyano	
26/6/2019	(Argentina) Lucho Capra (Argentina) Miguel Lamperti	3–6 / 6–3 / 6–4	(Spain) Alejandro Ruiz (Spain) Martin Sánchez Piñeiro	
26/6/2019	(Spain) Rubén Rivera (Spain) Toni Bueno	3–6 / 6–1 / 6–3	(Uruguay) Diego Ramos (Argentina) Juan Manuel Restivo	
26/6/2019	(Spain) José Rico (Spain) Víctor Ruiz	6–4 / 6–3	(Spain) Coki Nieto (Spain) Javi Rico	

Women's
Date	Winners	Score	Opponent	Ref.
26/6/2019	(Spain) Esther Carnicero (Spain) Melania Merino	6–4 / 6–3	(Spain) Nuria Vivancos (Sweden) Sofía Arvidsson	
26/6/2019	(Spain) Lucía Martínez (Spain) Teresa Navarro	6–1 / 6–4	(Spain) Ana Fernández de Ossó (Spain) Sara Ruiz	
26/6/2019	(Spain) Beatriz González (Argentina) Catalina Tenorio	6–3 / 6–1	(Spain) Julia Polo Bautista (Spain) Noelia Márquez	
26/6/2019	(Spain) Carolina Navarro (Argentina) Cecilia Reiter	6–1 / 7–5	(Spain) Araceli Martinez (Spain) Marta Talavan	
26/6/2019	(Spain) Sandra Hernández (Spain) Tamara Icardo	7–5 / 6–1	(Spain) Isabel Domínguez (Spain) Vanesa Alonso	
26/6/2019	(Spain) Anna Cortiles Tapia (Spain) Jessica Castelló	6–3 / 7–6	(Argentina) Celeste Paz (Spain) Estela Frances Fernández	
26/6/2019	(Spain) Maria Villalba (Spain) Verónica Virseda	6–1 / 4–6 / 6–2	(France) Alix Collombon (Spain) Nicole Traviesa Mola	
26/6/2019	(Portugal) Ana Catarina Nogueira (Spain) Paula Josemaría	6–7 / 6–4 / 6–2	(Portugal) Sofia Araújo (Argentina) Virginia Riera	
26/6/2019	(Argentina) Aranzazu Osoro (Argentina) Nela Brito	7–6 / 6–2	(Spain) Alba Galán (Spain) Victoria Iglesias	
26/6/2019	(Spain) Elisabeth Amatriain (Spain) Patricia Llaguno	6–2 / 6–2	(Spain) Angela Caro Cantin (Spain) Sara Pujals	
26/6/2019	(Spain) Alicia Blanco Rojo (Spain) Beatriz Caldera	6–4 / 5–7 / 6–2	(Sweden) Antonette Andersson (Sweden) Baharak Soleymani	
26/6/2019	(Spain) Carla Mesa (Spain) Lorena Alonso	7–5 / 2–6 / 6–3	(Spain) Carmen Goenaga (Spain) Nuria Rodríguez	

=== Round of 16 ===
Men's
Date	Winners	Score	Opponent	Ref.
27/6/2019	(Spain) Adrián Blanco (Spain) Javier Martinez Vazquez	6–3 / 7–6	(Argentina) Maxi Sánchez (Argentina) Sanyo Gutiérrez	
27/6/2019	(Spain) Javi Ruiz (Spain) Uri Botello	6–3 / 6–4	(Argentina) Juan Cruz Belluati (Spain) Pablo Lijó	
27/6/2019	(Argentina) Agustin Goméz Silingo (Argentina) Adrián Allemandi	6–4 / 5–3 / W.O.	(Brazil) Lucas Bergamini (Brazil) Lucas Campagnolo	
27/6/2019	(Argentina) Franco Stupaczuk (Spain) Matías Díaz	6–1 / 6–2	(Spain) Anton Sans (Spain) Mario Del Castillo	
27/6/2019	(Spain) Alejandro Galán (Spain) Juani Mieres	6–4 / 6–2	(Spain) Javi Garrido (Argentina) Martín Di Nenno	
27/6/2019	(Argentina) Federico Chingotto (Argentina) Juan Tello	6–4 / 6–7 / 6–4	(Spain) Nacho Gadea (Spain) Rafael Méndez	
27/6/2019	(Argentina) Lucho Capra (Argentina) Miguel Lamperti	3–6 / 7–6 / 6–0	(Spain) Rubén Rivera (Spain) Toni Bueno	
27/6/2019	(Spain) Juan Lebrón (Spain) Paquito Navarro	6–1 / 6–4	(Spain) José Rico (Spain) Víctor Ruiz	

Women's
Date	Winners	Score	Opponent	Ref.
27/6/2019	(Spain) Marta Marrero (Spain) Marta Ortega	6–2 / 6–2	(Spain) Esther Carnicero (Spain) Melania Merino	
27/6/2019	(Spain) Lucía Martínez (Spain) Teresa Navarro	6–3 / 6–2	(Spain) Beatriz González (Argentina) Catalina Tenorio	
27/6/2019	(Spain) Carolina Navarro (Argentina) Cecilia Reiter	6–4 / 6–2	(Spain) Sandra Hernández (Spain) Tamara Icardo	
27/6/2019	(Argentina) Delfina Brea (Spain) Majo Sánchez	6–1 / 6–1	(Spain) Anna Cortiles Tapia (Spain) Jessica Castelló	
27/6/2019	(Spain) Gemma Triay (Spain) Lucía Sainz	4–6 / 6–3 / 6–2	(Spain) Maria Villalba (Spain) Verónica Virseda	
27/6/2019	(Portugal) Ana Catarina Nogueira (Spain) Paula Josemaría	6–4 / 6–2	(Argentina) Aranzazu Osoro (Argentina) Nela Brito	
27/6/2019	(Spain) Elisabeth Amatriain (Spain) Patricia Llaguno	6–1 / 6–3	(Spain) Alicia Blanco Rojo (Spain) Beatriz Caldera	
27/6/2019	(Spain) Alejandra Salazar (Spain) Ariana Sánchez	6–3 / 6–4	(Spain) Carla Mesa (Spain) Lorena Alonso	

=== Quarter-Finals ===
Men's
Date	Winners	Score	Opponent	Ref.
28/6/2019	(Spain) Javi Ruiz (Spain) Uri Botello	6–3 / 6–3	(Spain) Adrián Blanco (Spain) Javier Martinez Vazquez	
28/6/2019	(Argentina) Franco Stupaczuk (Spain) Matías Díaz	6–3 / 6–2	(Argentina) Agustin Goméz Silingo (Argentina) Adrián Allemandi	
28/6/2019	(Spain) Alejandro Galán (Spain) Juani Mieres	7–6 / 7–6	(Argentina) Federico Chingotto (Argentina) Juan Tello	
28/6/2019	(Spain) Juan Lebrón (Spain) Paquito Navarro	7–5 / 6–1	(Argentina) Lucho Capra (Argentina) Miguel Lamperti	

Women's
Date	Winners	Score	Opponent	Ref.
28/6/2019	(Spain) Marta Marrero (Spain) Marta Ortega	6–1 / 7–5	(Spain) Lucía Martínez (Spain) Teresa Navarro	
28/6/2019	(Argentina) Delfina Brea (Spain) Majo Sánchez	6–2 / 7–6	(Spain) Carolina Navarro (Argentina) Cecilia Reiter	
28/6/2019	(Portugal) Ana Catarina Nogueira (Spain) Paula Josemaría	W.O.	(Spain) Gemma Triay (Spain) Lucía Sainz	
28/6/2019	(Spain) Alejandra Salazar (Spain) Ariana Sánchez	5–7 / 6–0 / 7–6	(Spain) Elisabeth Amatriain (Spain) Patricia Llaguno	

=== Semi-Finals ===
Men's
Date	Winners	Score	Opponent	Ref.
29/6/2019	(Argentina) Franco Stupaczuk (Spain) Matías Díaz	6–7 / 6–2 / 7–6	(Spain) Javi Ruiz (Spain) Uri Botello	
29/6/2019	(Spain) Juan Lebrón (Spain) Paquito Navarro	7–5 / 6–2	(Spain) Alejandro Galán (Spain) Juani Mieres	

Women's
Date	Winners	Score	Opponent	Ref.
29/6/2019	(Spain) Marta Marrero (Spain) Marta Ortega	5–7 / 6–2 / 6–2	(Argentina) Delfina Brea (Spain) Majo Sánchez	
29/6/2019	(Portugal) Ana Catarina Nogueira (Spain) Paula Josemaría	6–4 / 3–6 / 6–3	(Spain) Alejandra Salazar (Spain) Ariana Sánchez	

=== Finals ===
Men's
Date	Winners	Score	Opponent	Ref.
30/6/2019	(Spain) Juan Lebrón (Spain) Paquito Navarro	6–3 / 7–6	(Argentina) Franco Stupaczuk (Spain) Matías Díaz	

Women's
Date	Winners	Score	Opponent	Ref.
30/6/2019	(Spain) Marta Marrero (Spain) Marta Ortega	6–2 / 6–1	(Portugal) Ana Catarina Nogueira (Spain) Paula Josemaría	
