= 2023 La Rioja Open =

Padel championships

- Date: 6 March – 12 March
- Edition: 2nd
- Category: Open 1000
- Location: La Rioja, Argentina
- Venue: Super Domo

Champions
- Men's doubles: (Argentina) Agustín Tapia (Spain) Arturo Coello
- Women's doubles: (Spain) Alejandra Salazar (Spain) Gemma Triay

Chronology

The WPT La Rioja Open 2023 (officially WPT La Rioja Padel Open 1000 2023) was the second tournament of the eleventh edition of World Padel Tour. The final phase was played between March 6 and 12, 2023 at the "Super Dome" in La Rioja, Argentina, while the preliminary phase was played between February 10 and 12 at the "Euroindoor" in Madrid, Spain. The semi-finals broke the all-time attendance record for a padel match, with 13,723 spectators.

In the women's category, Alejandra Salazar and Gemma Triay reached their seventh consecutive final and won their first tournament of the year, against Bea González and Marta Ortega Gallego by 6–7, 6–4 and 6–1.

In the men's category, Agustín Tapia and Arturo Coello defeated the big surprise of the tournament, the wildcard pair formed by Leo Augsburger and Valentino Libaak, by 6–1 and 6–0.

== Relevant data ==
=== Record attendance ===
This was the first World Padel Tour (WPT) tournament in Argentina with a women's category, which generated even more excitement. As a result, less than three months after the Barcelona Master Final, the all-time attendance record for a padel match was broken again; there were 13,723 spectators at the semifinal matches on Saturday. This puts the WPT Barcelona Master Final 2022 in second place with 12,141 spectators, and the Mendoza P1 of the Premier Padel (also in Argentina) completes the top three with 11,106 spectators.

=== The best "WildCard" in history ===
The tournament's most notable event was the second and definitive debut on the world stage of the young Argentinian pair, Leandro Augsburger and Valentino Libaak. They first gained international recognition after receiving a wildcard entry into the Buenos Aires Master in November of the 2022, entering directly into the round of 32. They reached the round of 16, where they lost to the number one seeds, Alejandro Galán and Juan Lebrón. They then signed with NOX and moved to Barcelona to continue competing on the World Padel Tour. In this tournament, they also received a wildcard entry, and at 17 and 18 years old respectively, they defeated Juan Martín Díaz and Agustín Gómez Silingo in the round of 32 by a double 6–4, and in the round of 16, they beat the tournament's number 3 seeds, Juan Tello and Paquito Navarro, by 6–4 and 7–5. This put them in the quarterfinals, making Valentino Libaak the youngest player ever to reach the quarterfinals of a WPT tournament. They also defeated Maxi Sánchez and Lucas Campagnolo by 6–3 and 7–5, and in the semifinals, they won a very close match against Juan Cruz Belluati and Miguel Lamperti by 7–6 and 6–3. They reached the final, against Arturo Coello and Agustín Tapia, who defeated them 6–1 and 6–0 in just 42 minutes, which was the fastest final in history.

This is the best performance ever by a wildcard pair in a tournament. Libaak and Augsburger performance had an immediate media impact, as it demonstrated that they are both ready to compete against many of the pairs in the main draw. By reaching the final and defeating a seeded player, they each earned 600 ranking points, moving from 114th and 115th to 63rd and 64th, respectively.

=== Controversy withdrawals ===
Shortly before the tournament began, several withdrawals affected the men's main draw; as seven pairs confirmed their absence before it even started. Among them was the number one seed, Alejandro Galán and Juan Lebrón. This greatly angered Lisandro Borges, the promoter of WPT tournaments in South America, who made statements accusing them of "faking the injury" and of an "attempted boycott" of the tournament. Galán responded with a statement in which, among other things, told Borges that "I will not allow him to try to call my honor into question."

== Registered teams ==
Male

Rnk.	Team	WPT Ranking Points
1	(Argentina) Fernando Belasteguín (Argentina) Sanyo Gutiérrez	20.485
2	(Argentina) Agustín Tapia (Spain) Arturo Coello	20.485
3	(Argentina) Juan Tello (Spain) Paquito Navarro	15.550
4	(Argentina) Franco Stupaczuk (Argentina) Martín Di Nenno	15.525
5	(Spain) Alejandro Ruiz (Spain) Momo González	11.160
6	(Argentina) Federico Chingotto (Spain) Javi Garrido	9.895
7	(Brazil) Lucas Campagnolo (Argentina) Maxi Sánchez	8.100
8	(Spain) Agustín Gutiérrez (Argentina) Lucho Capra	6.581
9	(Spain) Javier Leal (Spain) Jon Sanz	4.746
10	(Spain) Francisco Gil (Argentina) Ramiro Moyano	4.339
11	(Spain) Gonzalo Rubio (Spain) Javier Ruiz González	3.996
12	(Argentina) Juan Cruz Belluati (Argentina) Miguel Lamperti	3.947
13	(Spain) José García Diestro (Spain) Pincho Fernández	3.524
14	(Spain) Josete Rico (Spain) Salvador Oria	3.442
15	(Brazil) Lucas Bergamini (Spain) Víctor Ruiz	3.431
16	(Spain) Eduardo Alonso Chillarón (Spain) Juanlu Esbri	2.935
17	(Argentina) Agustín Gomez Silingo (Spain) Juan Martín Díaz	2.741
18	(Spain) Javier García Mora (Spain) Javier González Barahona	2.525
19	(Spain) Marc Quílez (Spain) Toni Bueno	2.326
20	(Spain) Antón Sans (Spain) Teodoro Zapata	2.219
21	(Spain) Ignacio Vilariño (Spain) Jaime Muñoz	2.001
(W.C.)	(Argentina) Leo Augsburger (Argentina) Tino Libaak	314
Qualified from the preliminary rounds
A	(Italy) Facundo Domínguez (Chile) Javier Valdés	1048
B	(Spain) Iván Ramírez (Spain) Pablo Cardona	1645
C	(Spain) Luis Hernández Quesada (Spain) José Solano Marmolejo	1032

Female

Rnk.	Team	WPT Ranking Points
1	(Spain) Alejandra Salazar (Spain) Gemma Triay	33.060
2	(Spain) Ariana Sánchez (Spain) Paula Josemaría	32.390
3	(Spain) Bea González (Spain) Marta Ortega	16.926
4	(Spain) Patty Llaguno (Spain) Victoria Iglesias	10.448
5	(Argentina) Aranza Osoro (Spain) Lucía Sainz	10.075
6	(Spain) Bárbara Las Heras (Spain) Verónica Virseda	9.770
7	(Spain) Majo Sánchez Alayeto (Spain) Mapi Sánchez Alayeto	9.145
8	(Spain) Tamara Icardo (Argentina) Virginia Riera	8.825
9	(Argentina) Delfina Brea (Portugal) Sofia Araújo	6.641
10	(Argentina) Claudia Jensen (Spain) Jessica Castelló	4.995
11	(France) Alix Collombon (Spain) Carla Mesa	4.907
12	(Spain) Lorena Rufo (Spain) Marta Talaván	4.383
13	(Sweden) Carolina Navarro (Spain) Mª Carmen Villalba	3.481
14	(Spain) Beatriz Caldera (Spain) Carmen Goenaga	3.383
15	(Portugal) Ana Catarina Nogueira (Spain) Eli Amatriaín	3.135
16	(Spain) Marina Guinart (Spain) Nuria Rodríguez	3.084
17	(Spain) Claudia Fernández (Argentina) Julieta Bidahorria	3.063
18	(Spain) Marta Barrera (Spain) Marta Caparrós	2.671
19	(Spain) Anna Cortiles (Spain) Sofía Saiz	2.474
20	(Spain) Araceli Martínez (Spain) Noa Cánovas	2.470
21	(Spain) Alejandra Alonso (Spain) Melania Merino	2.391
22	(Spain) Marina Martínez Lobo (Spain) Teresa Navarro	2.340
23	(Spain) Alicia Blanco (Spain) Arantxa Soriano	2.186
(W.C.)	(Argentina) F. Darboure (Argentina) María Ferreyra	0
Qualified from the preliminary rounds
A	(Italy) Carolina Orsi (France) Léa Godallier	2148
B	(Spain) Lorena Alonso (Spain) Sandra Hernández Camacho	1884
C	(Spain) Águeda Pérez (Spain) Sara Ruiz	1304
D	(Italy) Emily Stellato (Italy) Giulia Sussarello	1925

Teams missing

Rnk.	Teams	WPT Ranking Points	Reason
1	(Spain) Alejandro Galán (Spain) Juan Lebrón	33.440	(Note: Alejandro Galán is on medical leave.)
7	(Spain) Coki Nieto (Brazil) Pablo Lima	10.736	(Note: Pablo Lima has discomfort in his knee.)
12	(Spain) Alejandro Arroyo (Spain) Miguel Yanguas	4.686	(Note: Alex Arroyo has an "abdominal rupture".)
19	(Spain) Javier Rico (Spain) Jorge Ruiz Gutiérrez	3.277	(Note: Javi Rico was injured at the Premier Padel "Qatar Major".)
26	(Spain) Mario del Castillo (Spain) Miguel Benítez Lara	1.989	(Note: Miguel Benítez has discomfort in his knee.)
27	(Italy) Denis Perino (Spain) Sergio Alba	1.928	(Note: Sergio Alba was injured.)
D	(Spain) Jaime Fermosell (Spain) José Jiménez Casas	1324	(Note: José Jiménez has a injury to the cartilage of the 5th metatarsal of the foot.)

== Schedule ==
The matches began on Saturday at the "Euroindoor Alcorcón" club with the preliminary rounds.

- Friday, 10th: Men's qualifying rounds 1 and 2.
- Saturday, 11th: Men's qualifying round 3 and women's qualifying rounds 1 and 2.
- Sunday, 12th: Final qualifying rounds for both men and women.

The final draw is played a month later.

- Tuesday, July 7: Round of 32.
- Wednesday, July 8: Round of 32.
- Thursday, July 9: Round of 16.
- Friday, July 10: Quarterfinals.
- Saturday, July 11: Semifinals.
- Sunday, July 12: Finals.

== Results ==
=== Men's Bracket ===
Round of 32
1	(Argentina) Belasteguín / (Argentina) Sanyo
bye
(Argentina) Moyano / (Spain) Xisco (W.O.)
(Spain) V. Ruiz / (Brazil) Bergamini
(Spain) M. Quílez / (Spain) T. Bueno	6	3	6
(Italy) Domínguez / (Chile) Valdés (A)	4	6	4
(Argentina) Belluati / (Argentina) Lamperti	7	6
8	(Argentina) A. Gutiérrez / (Argentina) Lucho	6	3
7	(Argentina) Maxi / (Brazil) Campagnolo
bye
(Spain) J. Muñoz / (Spain) I. Vilariño	1	6	2
(Spain) J. Esbri / (Spain) E. Alonso	6	4	6
(Argentina) Silingo / (Spain) J.M. Díaz	4	4
(Argentina) Libaak / (Argentina) Augsburger	6	6
bye
3	(Argentina) Tello / (Spain) Paquito
4	(Argentina) Stupaczuk / (Argentina) Di Nenno
bye
(Spain) A. Sans / (Spain) T. Zapata	7	3	3
(Spain) Pincho / (Spain) J.G. Diestro	5	6	6
(Spain) J.G. Mora / (Spain) J.G. Barahona	3	7	4
(Spain) Ivan R. / (Spain) P. Cardona (B)	6	5	6
bye
6	(Spain) Garrido / (Argentina) Chingotto
5	(Spain) Momo / (Spain) Alex Ruiz
bye
(Spain) Leal / (Spain) Sanz	6	6
(Spain) Josete Rico / (Spain) S. Oria	1	3
(Spain) Javi R. / (Spain) G. Rubio	6	6
(Spain) Hernández / (Spain) Solano (C)	4	3
bye
2	(Argentina) Tapia / (Spain) Coello

Round of 16
1	(Argentina) Belasteguín / (Argentina) Sanyo	5	3
(Brazil) Bergamini / (Spain) V. Ruiz	7	6
(Spain) M. Quílez / (Spain) T. Bueno	6	6
(Argentina) Belluati / (Argentina) Lamperti	7	7
7	(Brazil) Campagnolo / (Argentina) Maxi	7	7
(Spain) J. Esbri / (Spain) E. Alonso	5	6
(Argentina) Augsburger / (Argentina) Libaak	6	7
3	(Argentina) Tello / (Spain) Paquito	4	5
4	(Argentina) Stupa / (Argentina) Di Nenno	6	6
(Spain) Pincho / (Spain) J.G. Diestro	1	4
(Spain) Ivan R. / (Spain) P. Cardona (B)	6	2
6	(Spain) Garrido / (Argentina) Chingotto	7	6
5	(Spain) Alex / (Spain) Momo	6	6
(Spain) Leal / (Spain) Sanz	4	4
(Spain) Javi R. / (Spain) G. Rubio	6	1
2	(Argentina) Tapia / (Spain) Coello	7	6

Quarter-Final
(Brazil) Bergamini / (Spain) V. Ruiz	3	6	3
(Argentina) Belluati / (Argentina) Lamperti	6	4	6
7	(Brazil) Campagnolo / (Argentina) Maxi	3	5
(Argentina) Augsburger / (Argentina) Libaak	6	7
4	(Argentina) Stupaczuk / (Argentina) Di Nenno	6	3	6
6	(Spain) Garrido / (Argentina) Chingotto	0	6	3
5	(Spain) Álex Ruiz / (Spain) Momo	2	1
2	(Argentina) Tapia / (Spain) Coello	6	6

Semi-Finals
(Argentina) Belluati / (Argentina) Lamperti	6	3
(Argentina) Augsburger / (Argentina) Libaak	7	6
4	(Argentina) Stupaczuk / (Argentina) Di Nenno	4	3
2	(Argentina) Tapia / (Spain) Coello	6	6

Finals
(Argentina) Augsburger / (Argentina) Libaak	1	0
2	(Argentina) Tapia / (Spain) Coello	6	6

=== Women's Bracket ===
Round of 32
1	(Spain) Salazar / (Spain) Triay
Bye
(Spain) Lorena / (Spain) Sandra (B) (W.O.)
(Argentina) Delfi / (Portugal) S. Araújo
(Spain) L. Rufo / (Spain) Talaván	6	7
(Sweden) C. Navarro / (Spain) M. Villalba	3	5
(Argentina) Darboure / (Argentina) Ferreyra (W.C.)	0	0
8	(Spain) Tamara / (Argentina) Riera	6	6
7	(Spain) Majo / (Spain) Mapi	6	6
(France) Collombon / (Spain) Mesa	1	4
(Spain) Bidahorria / (Spain) Claudia F.	6	6
(Spain) Águeda / (Spain) Sara R. (C)	2	2
(Spain) A. Alonso / (Spain) M. Merino	6	6
(Portugal) A. Nogueira / (Spain) Amatriaín	4	4
Bye
4	(Spain) Victoria / (Spain) Patty
3	(Spain) Bea / (Spain) Martita
Bye
(Spain) C. Orsi / (France) Godallier (A)	1	3
(Spain) Araceli / (Spain) Cánovas	6	6
(Spain) A. Cortiles / (Spain) S. Saiz	5	2
(Spain) Caldera / (Spain) Goenaga	7	6
(Italy) Sussarello / Stellato (D) (W.O.)
5	(Argentina) Aranza / (Spain) Sainz
6	(Spain) Bárbara / (Spain) Virseda	3	6	7
(Spain) M. Barrera / (Spain) M. Caparrós	6	3	6
(Spain) Arantxa / (Spain) A. Blanco	4	4
(Spain) Marina M. / (Spain) Teresa N.	6	6
(Spain) Castelló / (Argentina) Jensen	6	6
(Spain) Guinart / (Spain) Nuria R.	0	3
Bye
2	(Spain) Ariana / (Spain) Paula

Round of 16
1	(Spain) Salazar / (Spain) Triay	6	6	5
(Argentina) Delfi / (Portugal) S. Araújo (inj.)	7	4	2
(Spain) Talaván / (Spain) L. Rufo	4	5
8	(Spain) Tamara / (Argentina) Riera	6	7
7	(Spain) Majo / (Spain) Mapi	6	7
(Spain) Bidahorria / (Spain) Claudia F.	4	6
(Spain) A. Alonso / (Spain) M. Merino	3	6	3
4	(Spain) Victoria / (Spain) Patty	6	3	6
3	(Spain) Bea / (Spain) Martita	7	6
(Spain) Araceli / (Spain) Cánovas	5	0
(Spain) Caldera / (Spain) Goenaga	6	6
5	(Argentina) Aranza / (Spain) Sainz	7	7
6	(Spain) Bárbara / (Spain) Virseda	6	4	6
(Spain) Marina M. / (Spain) Teresa N.	0	6	4
(Spain) Castelló / (Argentina) Jensen	4	1
2	(Spain) Ariana / (Spain) Paula	6	6

Quarter-Final
1	(Spain) Triay / (Spain) Salazar	6	6
8	(Spain) Tamara / (Argentina) Riera	2	1	7
7	(Spain) Majo / (Spain) Mapi	6	6	4
4	(Spain) Victoria / (Spain) Patty	2	7	6
3	(Spain) Bea / (Spain) Martita	6	6
5	(Argentina) Aranza / (Spain) Sainz	4	0
6	(Spain) Virseda / (Spain) Bárbara	3	4
2	(Spain) Ariana / (Spain) Paula	6	6

Semi-Finals
1	(Spain) Salazar / (Spain) Triay	6	7
4	(Spain) Patty / (Spain) Victoria	3	5
3	(Spain) Bea / (Spain) Martita	6	7
2	(Spain) Ariana / (Spain) Paula	4	5

Finals
1	(Spain) Salazar / (Spain) Triay	6	6	6
3	(Spain) Bea / (Spain) Martita	7	4	1

=== Final qualifying round ===
Men's

Data	Qualified	WPT Ranking Point	Opponents	Result
A	(Italy) Facundo Domínguez (Chile) Javier Valdés	1048 vs 1755	(Spain) Rafael Méndez (Spain) Javier Martínez	2–6 / 6–1 / 6–3
B	(Spain) Iván Ramírez (Spain) Pablo Cardona	1645 vs 835	(Spain) Miguel González (Spain) Aitor García Bassas	6–3 / 6–2
C	(Spain) Luis Hernández Quesada (Spain) José Solano Marmolejo	1032 vs 1015	(Spain) Alonso Rodríguez Martínez (Argentina) Cristian Germán	7–6 / 6–1
D	(Spain) Jaime Fermosell (Spain) José Jiménez	1324 vs 1097	(Spain) Enrique Goenaga (Spain) Jairo Bautista	6–4 / 6–1

Women's

Data	Qualified	WPT Ranking Point	Opponents	Result
A	(Italy) Carolina Orsi (France) Léa Godallier	2148 vs 1093	(Spain) Carmen García (Spain) Mónica Gómez	6–2 / 7–5
B	(Spain) Lorena Alonso (Spain) Sandra Hernández Camacho	1884 vs 1145	(Spain) Carmen Castillón (Spain) Marta Borrero	0–6 / 6–2 / 6–2
C	(Spain) Águeda Pérez (Spain) Sara Ruiz	1304 vs 1035	(Italy) Carlotta Casali (Spain) Mª Eulalia Rodríguez	7–5 / 6–3
D	(Italy) Emily Stellato (Italy) Giulia Sussarello	1925 vs 1505	(Spain) Ariadna Cañellas (Spain) Sandra Bellver	2–6 / 7–6 / 6–4

=== Round of 32 ===
Men's

Date	Team A	Score	Team B	Refs.
7/3/2023	(Spain) Ignacio Vilariño (Spain) Jaime Muñoz	6–1 / 4–6 / 6–2	(Spain) Eduardo Alonso (Spain) Juanlu Esbri	
7/3/2023	(Spain) Javier Leal (Spain) Jon Sanz	6–1 / 6–3	(Spain) Josete Rico (Spain) Salvador Oria	
8/3/2023	(Argentina) Juan Cruz Belluati (Argentina) Miguel Lamperti	7–6 / 6–3	(Argentina) Agustín Gutiérrez (Argentina) Lucho Capra	
8/3/2023	(Spain) Marc Quílez (Spain) Toni Bueno	6–4 / 3–6 / 6–4	(Italy) Facundo Domínguez (Chile) Javier Valdés	
8/3/2023	(Spain) Javier García Mora (Spain) Javier González Barahona	3–6 / 7–5 / 4–6	(Spain) Iván Ramírez (Spain) Pablo Cardona	
8/3/2023	(Spain) Antón Sans (Spain) Teodoro Zapata	7–5 / 3–6 / 3–6	(Spain) José García Diestro (Spain) Pincho Fernández	
8/3/2023	(Argentina) Agustín Gomez Silingo (Spain) Juan Martín Díaz	4–6 / 4–6	(Argentina) Leo Augsburger (Argentina) Valentino Libaak	
8/3/2023	(Spain) Gonzalo Rubio (Spain) Javier Ruiz	6–4 / 6–3	(Spain) Luis Hernández Quesada (Spain) José Solano Marmolejo	

Women's

Date	Team A	Score	Team B	Refs.
8/3/2023	(Spain) Majo Sánchez Alayeto (Spain) Mapi Sánchez Alayeto	6–1 / 6–4	(France) Alix Collombon (Spain) Carla Mesa	
8/3/2023	(Spain) Alejandra Alonso (Spain) Melania Merino	6–4 / 6–4	(Portugal) Ana Catarina Nogueira (Spain) Eli Amatriaín	
8/3/2023	(Italy) Carolina Orsi (France) Léa Godallier	1–6 / 3–6	(Spain) Araceli Martínez (Spain) Noa Cánovas	
8/3/2023	(Spain) Anna Cortiles (Spain) Sofía Saiz	5–7 / 2–6	(Spain) Beatriz Caldera (Spain) Carmen Goenaga	
8/3/2023	(Spain) Bárbara Las Heras (Spain) Verónica Virseda	3–6 / 6–3 / 7–6	(Spain) Marta Barrera (Spain) Marta Caparrós	
8/3/2023	(Argentina) Claudia Jensen (Spain) Jessica Castelló	6–0 / 6–3	(Spain) Marina Guinart (Spain) Nuria Rodríguez	
8/3/2023	(Spain) Claudia Fernández (Argentina) Julieta Bidahorria	6–2 / 6–2	(Spain) Águeda Pérez (Spain) Sara Ruiz	
8/3/2023	(Spain) Alicia Blanco (Spain) Arantxa Soriano	4–6 / 4–6	(Spain) Marina Martínez (Spain) Teresa Navarro	
8/3/2023	(Argentina) María Ferreyra (Argentina) F. Darboure	0–6 / 0–6	(Spain) Tamara Icardo (Argentina) Virginia Riera	
8/3/2023	(Spain) Lorena Rufo (Spain) Marta Talaván	6–3 / 7–5	(Sweden) Carolina Navarro (Spain) Mª Carmen Villalba	

=== Round of 16 ===
Men's

Date	Team A	Score	Team B	Refs.
9/3/2023	(Spain) Marc Quílez (Spain) Toni Bueno	6–7 / 6–7	(Argentina) Juan Cruz Belluati (Argentina) Miguel Lamperti	
9/3/2023	(Argentina) Fernando Belasteguín (Argentina) Sanyo Gutiérrez	5–7 / 3–6	(Brazil) Lucas Bergamini (Spain) Víctor Ruiz	
9/3/2023	(Spain) Iván Ramírez (Spain) Pablo Cardona	6–7 / 2–6	(Argentina) Federico Chingotto (Spain) Javi Garrido	
9/3/2023	(Brazil) Lucas Campagnolo (Argentina) Maxi Sánchez	7–5 / 7–6	(Spain) Eduardo Alonso (Spain) Juanlu Esbri	
9/3/2023	(Argentina) Leo Augsburger (Argentina) Valentino Libaak	6–4 / 7–5	(Argentina) Juan Tello (Spain) Paquito Navarro	
9/3/2023	(Argentina) Franco Stupaczuk (Argentina) Martín Di Nenno	6–1 / 6–4	(Spain) José García Diestro (Spain) Pincho Fernández	
9/3/2023	(Spain) Alex Ruiz (Spain) Momo González	6–4 / 6–4	(Spain) Javier Leal (Spain) Jon Sanz	
9/3/2023	(Spain) Gonzalo Rubio (Spain) Javier Ruiz	6–7 / 1–6	(Argentina) Agustín Tapia (Spain) Arturo Coello	

Women's

Date	Team A	Score	Team B	Refs.
9/3/2023	(Spain) Bea González (Spain) Marta Ortega	7–5 / 6–0	(Spain) Araceli Martínez (Spain) Noa Cánovas	
9/3/2023	(Spain) Alejandra Alonso (Spain) Melania Merino	3–6 / 6–3 / 3–6	(Spain) Patty Llaguno (Spain) Victoria Iglesias	
9/3/2023	(Spain) Beatriz Caldera (Spain) Carmen Goenaga	6–7 / 6–7	(Argentina) Aranza Osoro (Spain) Lucía Sainz	
9/3/2023	(Argentina) Claudia Jensen (Spain) Jessica Castelló	4–6 / 1–6	(Spain) Ariana Sánchez (Spain) Paula Josemaría	
9/3/2023	(Spain) Majo Sánchez Alayeto (Spain) Mapi Sánchez Alayeto	6–4 / 7–6	(Spain) Claudia Fernández (Argentina) Julieta Bidahorria	
9/3/2023	(Spain) Bárbara Las Heras (Spain) Verónica Virseda	6–0 / 4–6 / 6–4	(Spain) Marina Martínez (Spain) Teresa Navarro	
9/3/2023	(Spain) Alejandra Salazar (Spain) Gemma Triay	6–7 / 6–4 / 5–2 (*inj.)	(Argentina) Delfina Brea (Portugal) Sofia Araújo	
9/3/2023	(Spain) Lorena Rufo (Spain) Marta Talaván	4–6 / 5–7	(Spain) Tamara Icardo (Argentina) Virginia Riera	

=== Quarter-Finals ===
Men's

Date	Team A	Score	Team B	Refs.
10/3/2023	(Brazil) Lucas Bergamini (Spain) Víctor Ruiz	3–6 / 6–4 / 3–6	(Argentina) Juan Cruz Belluati (Argentina) Miguel Lamperti	
10/3/2023	(Brazil) Lucas Campagnolo (Argentina) Maxi Sánchez	3–6 / 5–7	(Argentina) Leo Augsburger (Argentina) Valentino Libaak	
10/3/2023	(Argentina) Franco Stupaczuk (Argentina) Martín Di Nenno	6–0 / 3–6 / 6–3	(Argentina) Federico Chingotto (Spain) Javier Garrido	
10/3/2023	(Spain) Alejandro Ruiz (Spain) Momo González	2–6 / 1–6	(Argentina) Agustín Tapia (Spain) Arturo Coello	

Women's

Date	Team A	Score	Team B	Refs.
10/3/2023	(Spain) Bárbara Las Heras (Spain) Verónica Virseda	3–6 / 4–6	(Spain) Ariana Sánchez (Spain) Paula Josemaría	
10/3/2023	(Spain) Bea González (Spain) Marta Ortega	6–4 / 6–0	(Argentina) Aranza Osoro (Spain) Lucía Sainz	
10/3/2023	(Spain) Alejandra Salazar (Spain) Gemma Triay	6–2 / 6–1	(Spain) Tamara Icardo (Argentina) Virginia Riera	
10/3/2023	(Spain) Majo Sánchez Alayeto (Spain) Mapi Sánchez Alayeto	6–2 / 6–7 / 4–6	(Spain) Victoria Iglesias (Spain) Patty Llaguno	

=== Semi-Finals ===
Men's

Date	Team A	Score	Team B	Refs.
11/3/2023	(Argentina) Juan Cruz Belluati (Argentina) Miguel Lamperti	6–7 / 3–6	(Argentina) Leo Augsburger (Argentina) Valentino Libaak	
11/3/2023	(Argentina) Franco Stupaczuk (Argentina) Martín Di Nenno	4–6 / 3–6	(Argentina) Agustín Tapia (Spain) Arturo Coello	

Women's

Date	Team A	Score	Team B	Refs.
11/3/2023	(Spain) Bea González (Spain) Marta Ortega	6–3 / 7–5	(Spain) Ariana Sánchez (Spain) Paula Josemaría	
11/3/2023	(Spain) Alejandra Salazar (Spain) Gemma Triay	6–4 / 7–5	(Spain) Patty Llaguno (Spain) Victoria Iglesias	

=== Finals ===
Men's

Date	Team A	Score	Team B	Refs.
12/3/2023	(Argentina) Leo Augsburger (Argentina) Valentino Libaak	1–6 / 0–6	(Argentina) Agustín Tapia (Spain) Arturo Coello	

Women's

Date	Team A	Score	Team B	Refs.
12/3/2023	(Spain) Alejandra Salazar (Spain) Gemma Triay	6–7 / 6–4 / 6–1	(Spain) Bea González (Spain) Marta Ortega	
