= 2025 Tarragona P1 =

Padel championships

- Date: 27 July – 3 August
- Edition: 1st
- Category: P1
- Prize money: €474.500
- Location: Tarragona, Spain
- Venue: Palau dels Esports de Barcelona

Champions
- Men's doubles: (Argentina) Agustín Tapia (Spain) Arturo Coello
- Women's doubles: (Argentina) Delfina Brea (Spain) Gemma Triay

Chronology

The 2025 Tarragona P1 (officially 2025 Premier Padel Cupra Costa Daurada Tarragona P1) was the fourteenth tournament of the fourth season organized by Premier Padel, the premier padel circuit, promoted by the International Padel Federation, and with the financial backing of Nasser Al-Khelaïfi's Qatar Sports Investments.

In the women's category, the top two pairs in the FIP rankings reached the final for the seventh time this season. In the title match, the world number 2 pair Delfina Brea and Gemma Triay defeated Ariana Sánchez and Paula Josemaría, claiming their sixth title of the season.

In the men's category, the two top ranked pairs faced each other in the finals for the third consecutive tournament. In the decisive match, Agustín Tapia and Arturo Coello defeated Alejandro Galán and Federico Chingotto in straight sets, claiming their eighth title of the season.

== Relevant Data ==
=== Three former world number ones announce their retirement ===
Following the retirement announcements from Carolina Navarro (at the end of the season) and Alejandra Salazar (for 2026), Marta Marrero, a former world number one in 2016 (with Salazar) and 2019 (alongside Marta Ortega), announced on social media that the Tarragona P1 would be her final tournament. "Today, I close a very special chapter of my life: I am saying goodbye to professional padel. These have been years of hard work, learning, and people who left their mark on my journey," the former number one said in a video.

In addition to her two stints at the top of the rankings, "El Huracán" (The Hurricane) was one of the major stars of the World Padel Tour era, amassing 26 titles and reaching 52 finals. Marrero admitted the decision was difficult, but one of the reasons is that she is expecting her second child. She had returned to competition just over a year ago, in June 2024, following the birth of her daughter, Flavia, competing on the Premier Padel circuit and wrapping up her career alongside partners Aranza Osoro, Bárbara Las Heras, Ksenia Sharifova, Virginia Riera, and Lucía Martínez.

=== Delfina and Gemma reach the top ===
With Delfina Brea and Gemma Triay's victory over Ariana Sanchéz and Paula Josemaria, the Spaniard and the Argentine became the new world number ones. Although Gemma had previously held the top spot individually during the season, the finals victory saw the pair claim the number one ranking as a team for the first time, just before the summer break. They also extended their head-to-head record against Ariana and Paula to 6–1 in their favor.

=== Second most successful pair of all time ===
With their victory at the Tarragona P1, Agustín Tapia and Arturo Coello reached a total of 37 trophies won as a pair, surpassing Fernando Belasteguín and Pablo Lima and trailing only the duo of Belasteguín and Juan Martín Díaz.

=== Coello breaks into the top 3 ===
Individually, Arturo Coello has climbed the podium of active players with the most titles, surpassing Juan Lebrón (40 trophies) to take third place with 41 tournament victories. Completing the list are Alejandro Galán with 49 titles (1st), Tapia with 48 (2nd), Sanyo Gutiérrez with 37 (5th), and Paquito Navarro with 26 (6th).

=== Tapia unbeaten in head-to-head matchups ===
Agustín Tapia's head-to-head record:

- Against Alejandro Galán: 29–26
- Against Federico Chingotto: 30–14
- Against Juan Lebrón: 28–22
- Against Martin Di Nenno: 29–8
- Against Paquito Navarro: 30–7
- Against Jon Sanz: 24–4
- Against Coki Nieto: 23–2
- Against Pablo Cardona: 10–1

== Seeds ==
Male

Rnk.	Team	FIP Ranking Points
1	(Argentina) Agustín Tapia (Spain) Arturo Coello	37880
2	(Spain) Alejandro Galán (Argentina) Federico Chingotto	26180
3	(Argentina) Franco Stupaczuk (Spain) Juan Lebrón	16255
4	(Spain) Coki Nieto (Spain) Mike Yanguas	13977
5	(Brazil) Lucas Bergamini (Spain) Paquito Navarro	9900
6	(Argentina) Leandro Augsburguer (Argentina) Martin Di Nenno	8782
7	(Spain) Eduardo Alonso (Spain) Momo Gonzalez	8109
8	(Argentina) Juan Tello (Spain) Pablo Cardona	6652
9	(Spain) Francisco Guerrero (Spain) Javi Leal	5347
10	(Spain) Alejandro Arroyo (United Arab Emirates) Inigo Jofre	4394
11	(Spain) Javier Barahona (Spain) Javier Garcia Mora	4155
12	(Argentina) Alex Chozas (Argentina) Leonel Aguirre	3975
13	(Spain) Jose Garcia Diestro (Spain) Juanlu Esbri	3788
14	(Spain) Alejandro Ruiz (Spain) Victor Ruiz	3741
15	(Spain) Francisco Gil (Argentina) Maxi Sánchez	3047
16	(Italy) Aris Patiniotis (Argentina) Gonzalo Alfonso	2874

Female

Rnk.	Team	FIP Ranking Points
1	(Spain) Ariana Sánchez (Spain) Paula Josemaria	31060
2	(Argentina) Delfina Brea (Spain) Gemma Triay	30050
3	(Spain) Bea González (Spain) Claudia Fernandéz	22320
4	(Spain) Andrea Ustero (Portugal) Sofia Araújo	13405
5	(Spain) Marta Ortega (Spain) Tamara Icardo	11750
6	(Spain) Alejandra Alonso (Argentina) Claudia Jensen	9465
7	(Argentina) Aranzazu Osoro (Spain) Veronica Virseda	8755
8	(Spain) Alejandra Salazar (Spain) Martina Calvo	7477
9	(Spain) Lucia Sainz (Spain) Patricia Llaguno	7090
10	(Spain) Beatriz Caldera (Spain) Carmen Goenaga	5894
11	(Spain) Jessica Castelló (Spain) Lorena Rufo	5630
12	(Spain) Marina Guinart (Spain) Victoria Iglesias	5349
13	(France) Alix Collombon (Spain) Araceli Martinez	3905
14	(Spain) Marta Barrera (Spain) Marta Caparrós	3670
15	(Italy) Carolina Orsi (Spain) Nuria Rodriguez	3393
16	(Argentina) Lucia Martinez Gomez (Spain) Marta Marrero	3305

== Head-to-head record between teams ranked in the top 4 during the season ==
=== Man's ===
Record	Coello–Tapia	Galán–Chingotto	Lebrón–Stupaczuk	Coki–Yanguas
Coello–Tapia	—	5–1	2–1	3–0
Galán–Chingotto	1–5	—	4–1	3–0
Lebrón–Stupaczuk	1–2	1–4	—	—
Coki–Yanguas	0–3	0–3	—	—

=== Women's ===
Record	Ariana–Paula	D. Brea–Triay	Gonzalez–Fernandez	Araújo–Ustero	Former Pairs	Araújo–Ortega
Ariana–Paula	—	1–5	7–1	2–0		1–1
D. Brea–Triay	5–1	—	2–4	1–0		3–0
Gonzalez–Fernandez	1–7	4–2	—	—		—
Araújo–Ustero	0–2	0–1	—	—		—
Former Pairs						
Araújo–Ortega	1–1	0–3	—	—		—

Because the Santiago final ended in a draw, it is not counted.

== Draws ==
=== Men's Bracket ===
Round of 32
1	(Spain) Coello / (Argentina) Tapia	6	7
22	(Spain) A.F. Lancha / (Spain) A. Cepero	3	6
Q	(Spain) M.H. Hernandez / (Argentina) M. Arce	2	*
10	(Spain) A. Arroyo / (United Arab Emirates) I. Jofre	1
16	(Italy) A. Patiniotis / (Argentina) G. Alfonso	6	7	1
34	(Argentina) A. Gutiérrez / (Chile) J. Valdes	7	6	6
26	(Argentina) F. Mouriño / (Argentina) R. Valenzuela	4	3
6	(Argentina) L. Augsburger / (Argentina) Di Nenno	6	6
8	(Argentina) J. Tello / (Spain) P. Cardona	7	5	6
18	(Spain) D. Sánchez / (Brazil) L. Campagnolo	6	7	7
27	(Spain) P.G. Rodrigo / (Spain) P. Fernandez	6	4
12	(Argentina) A. Chozas / (Argentina) L. Aguirre	7	6
14	(Spain) Á Ruiz / (Spain) V. Ruiz	6	7
35	(Spain) I. Vilariño / (Spain) S. Oria	4	6
29	(Spain) D. Sastre / (Spain) E. Chamero	3	4
4	(Spain) Coki / (Spain) Yanguas	6	6
3	(Spain) Lebrón / (Argentina) Stupaczuk	*
37	(United Arab Emirates) A. Ayats / (Spain) J. Rico
36	(Spain) M. Del Castillo / (Argentina) M. Lamperti	3	6
15	(Spain) F. Gil / (Argentina) Maxi	6	7
9	(Spain) F. Guerrero / (Spain) J. Leal	6	6
32	(Italy) D. Perino / (Argentina) I. Piotto	3	2
Q	(Spain) P. Miñano / (Spain) V. Mena	4	3
7	(Spain) E. Alonso / (Spain) Momo	6	6
5	(Brazil) L. Bergamini / (Spain) Paquito	6	4
Q	(Spain) A. Goñi / (Spain) M. Ortega	7	6
30	(Argentina) E. Torre / (Italy) E. Jensen	6	6
11	(Spain) J. Barahona / (Spain) J.G. Mora	2	4
13	(Spain) J.G. Diestro / (Spain) J. Esbri	7	5	6
19	(Spain) E. Goenaga / (Spain) L.H. Quesada	6	7	3
20	(Spain) J.J. Casas / (Spain) T. Zapata	1	2
2	(Argentina) Chingotto / (Spain) Galán	6	6

Round of 16
1	(Spain) Coello / (Argentina) Tapia	6	6
Q	(Spain) M.H. Hernandez / (Argentina) M. Arce	2	2
34	(Argentina) A. Gutiérrez / (Chile) J. Valdes	5	1
6	(Argentina) L. Augsburger / (Argentina) Di Nenno	7	6
18	(Spain) D. Sánchez / (Brazil) L. Campagnolo	6	3	7
12	(Argentina) A. Chozas / (Argentina) L. Aguirre	4	6	6
14	(Spain) Á Ruiz / (Spain) V. Ruiz	4	1
4	(Spain) Coki / (Spain) Yanguas	6	6
3	(Spain) Lebrón / (Argentina) Stupaczuk	7	7
15	(Spain) F. Gil / (Argentina) Maxi	6	6
9	(Spain) F. Guerrero / (Spain) J. Leal	4	6	7
7	(Spain) E. Alonso / (Spain) Momo	6	3	5
Q	(Spain) A. Goñi / (Spain) M. Ortega	6	3	6
30	(Argentina) E. Torre / (Italy) E. Jensen	4	6	4
13	(Spain) J.G. Diestro / (Spain) J. Esbri	3	4
2	(Argentina) Chingotto / (Spain) Galán	6	6

Quarter-Final
1	(Spain) Coello / (Argentina) Tapia	6	7
6	(Argentina) L. Augsburger / (Argentina) Di Nenno	3	6
18	(Spain) D. Sánchez / (Brazil) L. Campagnolo	2	2
4	(Spain) Coki / (Spain) Yanguas	6	6
3	(Spain) Lebrón / (Argentina) Stupaczuk	6	7	6
9	(Spain) F. Guerrero / (Spain) J. Leal	7	5	3
Q	(Spain) A. Goñi / (Spain) M. Ortega	2	0
2	(Argentina) Chingotto / (Spain) Galán	6	6

Semi-Finals
1	(Spain) Coello / (Argentina) Tapia	6	6	6
4	(Spain) Coki / (Spain) Yanguas	4	7	2
3	(Spain) Lebrón / (Argentina) Stupaczuk	3	6
2	(Argentina) Chingotto / (Spain) Galán	6	7

Finals
1	(Spain) Coello / (Argentina) Tapia	7	7
2	(Argentina) Chingotto / (Spain) Galán	6	5

=== Women's Bracket ===
Round of 32
1	(Spain) A. Sánchez / (Spain) P. Josemaria
Bye
23	(Spain) B. Las Heras / (Italy) G. Marchetti	5	3
13	(France) A.Collombon / (Spain) A. Martinez	7	6
11	(Spain) J. Castelló / (Spain) L. Rufo	6	6
9	(Spain) L. Sainz / (Spain) P. Llaguno	3	2
15	(Italy) C. Orsi / (Spain) N. Rodriguez	5	3
8	(Spain) A. Salazar / (Spain) M. Calvo	7	6
7	(Argentina) A. Osoro / (Spain) V. Virseda	6	6
WC	(Spain) A. Gascó / (Spain) A. Salvado	2	4
18	(Portugal) A. Nogueira / (Argentina) M. Goyeneche	2	4
12	(Spain) M. Guinart / (Spain) V. Iglesias	6	6
Q	(Spain) J. Bautista / (Spain) N. Aguilar	6	6
Q	(Sweden) C. Navarro / (Spain) M. Merino	1	3
Bye
4	(Spain) A. Ustero / (Portugal) S. Araújo
3	(Spain) B. Gonzalez / (Spain) C. Fernandéz
Bye
17	(Spain) J. Velasco / (Spain) N. Canovas	6	0	3
Q	(Spain) A. Perez / (Spain) M. Borrero	2	6	6
14	(Spain) M. Barrera / (Spain) M. Caparrós	6	4	5
16	(Spain) L. Martinez / (Spain) M. Marrero	3	6	6
Q	(Spain) L. Lujan / (Spain) L. Manquillo	6	1	1
6	(Spain) A. Alonso / (Argentina) C. Jensen	4	6	6
5	(Spain) M. Ortega / (Spain) T. Icardo	6	6
21	(Spain) C. Mesa / (Spain) S. Ruiz	3	3
22	(Spain) M. Lobo / (Spain) S. Saiz	1	6	6
19	(Spain) M. Talavan / (Spain) T. Navarro	6	4	4
20	(Argentina) J. Bidahorria / (Spain) L. Arruabarrena	1	4
10	(Spain) B. Caldera / (Spain) C. Goenaga	6	6
Bye
2	(Argentina) D. Brea / (Spain) G. Triay

Round of 16
1	(Spain) A. Sánchez / (Spain) P. Josemaria	7	6
13	(France) A.Collombon / (Spain) A. Martinez	6	4
11	(Spain) J. Castelló / (Spain) L. Rufo	6	6
8	(Spain) A. Salazar / (Spain) M. Calvo	2	2
7	(Argentina) A. Osoro / (Spain) V. Virseda	5	6	1
12	(Spain) M. Guinart / (Spain) V. Iglesias	7	4	6
Q	(Spain) J. Bautista / (Spain) N. Aguilar	2	4
4	(Spain) A. Ustero / (Portugal) S. Araújo	6	6
3	(Spain) B. Gonzalez / (Spain) C. Fernandéz	6	6
Q	(Spain) A. Perez / (Spain) M. Borrero	0	3
16	(Spain) L. Martinez / (Spain) M. Marrero	3	5
6	(Spain) A. Alonso / (Argentina) C. Jensen	6	7
5	(Spain) M. Ortega / (Spain) T. Icardo	6	6
22	(Spain) M. Lobo / (Spain) S. Saiz	4	1
10	(Spain) B. Caldera / (Spain) C. Goenaga	0	3
2	(Argentina) D. Brea / (Spain) G. Triay	6	6

Quarter-Final
1	(Spain) A. Sánchez / (Spain) P. Josemaria	6	6
11	(Spain) J. Castelló / (Spain) L. Rufo	2	1
12	(Spain) M. Guinart / (Spain) V. Iglesias	5	6
4	(Spain) A. Ustero / (Portugal) S. Araújo	7	7
3	(Spain) B. Gonzalez / (Spain) C. Fernandéz	6	7
6	(Spain) A. Alonso / (Argentina) C. Jensen	2	6
5	(Spain) M. Ortega / (Spain) T. Icardo	3	4
2	(Argentina) D. Brea / (Spain) G. Triay	6	6

Semi-Finals
1	(Spain) A. Sánchez / (Spain) P. Josemaria	7	6
4	(Spain) A. Ustero / (Portugal) S. Araújo	6	3
3	(Spain) B. Gonzalez / (Spain) C. Fernandéz	6	6	6
2	(Argentina) D. Brea / (Spain) G. Triay	7	3	7

Finals
1	(Spain) A. Sánchez / (Spain) P. Josemaria	6	4
2	(Argentina) D. Brea / (Spain) G. Triay	7	6

== Results ==
=== First Round ===
Men's

Date	Winners	Score	Opponent	Refs.
28/7/2025	(Spain) Alvero Cepero (Spain) Andres Fernandez Lancha	7–5 / 6–4	(Argentina) Juan Cruz Belluati (Spain) Pablo Lijó	
29/7/2025	(Spain) Mario Huete Hernandez (Argentina) Maximiliano Arce	7–6 / 4–6 / 7–5	(Argentina) Juan Ignacio De Pascual (Spain) Manuel Castaño Salguero	
28/7/2025	(Argentina) Agustín Gutiérrez (Chile) Javier Valdes	6–4 / 6–3	(Italy) Facundo Dominguez (Spain) Jesus Moya	
28/7/2025	(Argentina) Federico Mouriño (Argentina) Ramiro Valenzuela	2–6 / 7–5 / 7–5	(Spain) Guillermo Collado (Spain) Pol Hernandez	
29/7/2025	(Spain) David Gala Sanchez (Brazil) Lucas Campagnolo	6–4 / 6–3	(Spain) Diego García (Sweden) Simon Vasquez	
28/7/2025	(Spain) Pablo García Rodrigo (Spain) Pincho Fernandez	6–0 / 6–3	(Spain) Enric Sanmarti (Spain) Gerard Arnaldos	
29/7/2025	(Spain) Ignacio Vilariño (Spain) Salvador Oria	6–4 / 4–6 / 7–6	(Spain) Ignacio Sager (Spain) Javier Martinez Vazquez	
29/7/2025	(Spain) Daniel Santigosa (Spain) Emilio Sanchez Chamero	4–6 / 6–3 / 6–2	(Spain) Francisco Cabeza (Argentina) Ramiro Moyano	
28/7/2025	(Spain) Arnau Ayats (Spain) Jose Rico	3–6 / 7–6 / 7–6	(Portugal) Miguel Deus (Portugal) Nuno Deus	
28/7/2025	(Spain) Mario Del Castillo (Argentina) Miguel Lamperti	6–3 / 3–6 / 7–6	(Spain) Anton Sans Riola (Spain) Marc Quilez	
29/7/2025	(Italy) Denis Perino (Argentina) Ignacio Piotto	6–4 / 7–6	(Spain) Alvaro Montiel (Italy) Flavio Abbate	
29/7/2025	(Spain) Pau Miñano (Spain) Victor Mena Gil	6–4 / 7–6	(Spain) Alberto Garcia Trabanco (Spain) Ivan Ramirez	
29/7/2025	(Spain) Aimar Goñi (Spain) Mario Ortega	6–3 / 6–4	(Spain) Adrian Marques (Spain) Marc Sintes	
29/7/2025	(Argentina) Eduardo Agustin Torre (Italy) Enzo Jensen	6–3 / 6–4	(Spain) Albert Trillas (Spain) Guillem Figuerola	
29/7/2025	(Spain) Enrique Goenaga (Spain) Luis Hernandez Quesada	1–6 / 7–5 / 7–6	(Spain) Gonzalo Rubio (Spain) Javi Ruiz	
29/7/2025	(Spain) Jose Jimenez Casas (Spain) Teodoro Zapata	6–3 / 6–1	(Spain) Francisco Jurado (Spain) Pablo Castillo Valverde	

=== Round of 32 ===
Men's

Date	Winners	Score	Opponent	Refs.
30/7/2025	(Argentina) Agustín Tapia (Spain) Arturo Coello	6–3 / 7–6	(Spain) Alvero Cepero (Spain) Andres Fernandez Lancha	
30/7/2025	(Spain) Mario Huete Hernandez (Argentina) Maximiliano Arce	2–1 / W.O.	(Spain) Alex Arroyo (United Arab Emirates) Iñigo Jofre	
30/7/2025	(Argentina) Agustín Gutiérrez (Chile) Javier Valdes	7–6 / 6–7 / 6–1	(Italy) Aris Patiniotis (Argentina) Gonzalo Alfonso	
30/7/2025	(Argentina) Leandro Augsburger (Argentina) Martin Di Nenno	6–4 / 6–3	(Argentina) Federico Mouriño (Argentina) Ramiro Valenzuela	
30/7/2025	(Spain) David Gala Sanchez (Brazil) Lucas Campagnolo	6–7 / 7–5 / 7–6	(Argentina) Juan Tello (Spain) Pablo Cardona	
30/7/2025	(Argentina) Alex Chozas (Argentina) Leonel Aguirre	7–6 / 6–4	(Spain) Pablo García Rodrigo (Spain) Pincho Fernandez	
30/7/2025	(Spain) Aléx Ruiz (Spain) Victor Ruiz	6–4 / 7–6	(Spain) Ignacio Vilariño (Spain) Salvador Oria	
30/7/2025	(Spain) Coki Nieto (Spain) Mike Yanguas	6–3 / 6–4	(Spain) Daniel Santigosa (Spain) Emilio Sanchez Chamero	
30/7/2025	(Argentina) Franco Stupaczuk (Spain) Juan Lebrón	W.O.	(Spain) Arnau Ayats (Spain) Jose Rico	
30/7/2025	(Spain) Francisco Gil Morales (Argentina) Maxi Sánchez	6–3 / 7–6	(Spain) Mario Del Castillo (Argentina) Miguel Lamperti	
30/7/2025	(Spain) Francisco Guerrero (Spain) Javier Leal	6–3 / 6–2	(Italy) Denis Perino (Argentina) Ignacio Piotto	
30/7/2025	(Spain) Eduardo Alonso (Spain) Momo Gonzalez	6–4 / 6–3	(Spain) Pau Miñano (Spain) Victor Mena Gil	
30/7/2025	(Spain) Aimar Goñi (Spain) Mario Ortega	7–6 / 6–4	(Brazil) Lucas Bergamini (Spain) Paquito Navarro	
30/7/2025	(Argentina) Eduardo Agustin Torre (Italy) Enzo Jensen	6–2 / 6–4	(Spain) Javier Barahona (Spain) Javier García Mora	
30/7/2025	(Spain) Jose García Diestro (Spain) Juanlu Esbri	7–6 / 5–7 / 6–3	(Spain) Enrique Goenaga (Spain) Luis Hernandez Quesada	
30/7/2025	(Spain) Alejandro Galán (Argentina) Federico Chingotto	6–1 / 6–2	(Spain) Jose Jimenez Casas (Spain) Teodoro Zapata	

Women's

Date	Winners	Score	Opponent	Refs.
30/7/2025	(France) Alix Collombon (Spain) Araceli Martinez	7–5 / 6–3	(Spain) Barbara Las Heras (Italy) Giorgia Marchetti	
29/7/2025	(Spain) Jessica Castelló (Spain) Lorena Rufo	6–3 / 6–2	(Spain) Lucia Sainz (Spain) Patricia Llaguno	
30/7/2025	(Spain) Alejandra Salazar (Spain) Martina Calvo	7–5 / 6–3	(Italy) Carolina Orsi (Spain) Nuria Rodriguez	
30/7/2025	(Argentina) Aranzazu Osoro (Spain) Verónica Virseda	6–2 / 6–4	(Spain) Alba Gallardo (Spain) Anna Ortiz	
29/7/2025	(Spain) Marina Guinart (Spain) Victoria Iglesias	6–2 / 6–4	(Portugal) Ana Catarina Nogueira (Argentina) Martina Fassio Goyeneche	
29/7/2025	(Spain) Julia Polo Bautista (Spain) Noemi Aguilar	6–1 / 6–3	(Sweden) Carolina Navarro Björk (Spain) Melania Merino	
29/7/2025	(Spain) Agueda Perez (Spain) Marta Borrero	2–6 / 6–0 / 6–3	(Spain) Jimena Velasco (Spain) Noa Canovas	
30/7/2025	(Spain) Lucia Martinez Gomez (Spain) Marta Marrero	3–6 / 6–4 / 7–5	(Spain) Marta Barrera (Spain) Marta Caparrós	
29/7/2025	(Spain) Alejandra Alonso (Argentina) Claudia Jensen	4–6 / 6–1 / 6–1	(Spain) Laura Lujan Rodriguez (Spain) Letizia Manquillo	
30/7/2025	(Spain) Marta Ortega (Spain) Tamara Icardo	6–3 / 6–3	(Spain) Carla Mesa (Spain) Sara Ruiz Soto	
29/7/2025	(Spain) Marina Martinez Lobo (Spain) Sofía Saiz Vallejo	1–6 / 6–4 / 6–4	(Spain) Marta Talavan (Spain) Teresa Navarro	
29/7/2025	(Spain) Beatriz Caldera (Spain) Carmen Goenaga	6–1 / 6–4	(Argentina) Julieta Bidahorria (Spain) Lara Arruabarrena	

=== Round of 16 ===
Men's

Date	Winners	Score	Opponent	Refs.
31/7/2025	(Argentina) Agustín Tapia (Spain) Arturo Coello	6–2 / 6–2	(Spain) Mario Huete Hernandez (Argentina) Maximiliano Arce	
31/7/2025	(Argentina) Leandro Augsburger (Argentina) Martin Di Nenno	7–5 / 6–1	(Argentina) Agustín Gutiérrez (Chile) Javier Valdes	
31/7/2025	(Spain) David Gala Sanchez (Brazil) Lucas Campagnolo	6–4 / 3–6 / 7–6	(Argentina) Alex Chozas (Argentina) Leonel Aguirre	
31/7/2025	(Spain) Coki Nieto (Spain) Mike Yanguas	6–4 / 6–1	(Spain) Aléx Ruiz (Spain) Victor Ruiz	
31/7/2025	(Argentina) Franco Stupaczuk (Spain) Juan Lebrón	7–6 / 7–6	(Spain) Francisco Gil Morales (Argentina) Maxi Sánchez	
31/7/2025	(Spain) Francisco Guerrero (Spain) Javier Leal	4–6 / 6–3 / 7–5	(Spain) Eduardo Alonso (Spain) Momo Gonzalez	
31/7/2025	(Spain) Aimar Goñi (Spain) Mario Ortega	6–4 / 3–6 / 6–4	(Argentina) Eduardo Agustin Torre (Italy) Enzo Jensen	
31/7/2025	(Spain) Alejandro Galán (Argentina) Federico Chingotto	6–3 / 6–4	(Spain) Jose García Diestro (Spain) Juanlu Esbri	

Women's

Date	Winners	Score	Opponent	Refs.
31/7/2025	(Spain) Ariana Sánchez (Spain) Paula Josemaría	7–6 / 6–4	(France) Alix Collombon (Spain) Araceli Martinez	
31/7/2025	(Spain) Jessica Castelló (Spain) Lorena Rufo	6–2 / 6–2	(Spain) Alejandra Salazar (Spain) Martina Calvo	
31/7/2025	(Spain) Marina Guinart (Spain) Victoria Iglesias	7–5 / 4–6 / 6–1	(Argentina) Aranzazu Osoro (Spain) Verónica Virseda	
31/7/2025	(Spain) Andrea Ustero (Portugal) Sofia Araújo	6–2 / 6–4	(Spain) Julia Polo Bautista (Spain) Noemi Aguilar	
31/7/2025	(Spain) Bea González (Spain) Claudia Fernández	6–0 / 6–3	(Spain) Agueda Perez (Spain) Marta Borrero	
31/7/2025	(Spain) Alejandra Alonso (Argentina) Claudia Jensen	6–3 / 7–5	(Spain) Lucia Martinez Gomez (Spain) Marta Marrero	
31/7/2025	(Spain) Marta Ortega (Spain) Tamara Icardo	6–4 / 6–1	(Spain) Marina Martinez Lobo (Spain) Sofía Saiz Vallejo	
31/7/2025	(Argentina) Delfina Brea (Spain) Gemma Triay	6–0 / 6–3	(Spain) Beatriz Caldera (Spain) Carmen Goenaga	

=== Quarter-Finals ===
Men's

Date	Winners	Score	Opponent	Refs.
1/8/2025	(Argentina) Agustín Tapia (Spain) Arturo Coello	6–3 / 7–6	(Argentina) Leandro Augsburger (Argentina) Martin Di Nenno	
1/8/2025	(Spain) Coki Nieto (Spain) Mike Yanguas	6–2 / 6–2	(Spain) David Gala Sanchez (Brazil) Lucas Campagnolo	
1/8/2025	(Argentina) Franco Stupaczuk (Spain) Juan Lebrón	6–7 / 7–5 / 6–3	(Spain) Francisco Guerrero (Spain) Javier Leal	
1/8/2025	(Spain) Alejandro Galán (Argentina) Federico Chingotto	6–2 / 6–0	(Spain) Aimar Goñi (Spain) Mario Ortega	

Women's

Date	Winners	Score	Opponent	Refs.
1/8/2025	(Spain) Ariana Sánchez (Spain) Paula Josemaría	6–2 / 6–1	(Spain) Jessica Castelló (Spain) Lorena Rufo	
1/8/2025	(Spain) Andrea Ustero (Portugal) Sofia Araújo	7–5 / 7–6	(Spain) Marina Guinart (Spain) Victoria Iglesias	
1/8/2025	(Spain) Bea González (Spain) Claudia Fernández	6–2 / 7–6	(Spain) Alejandra Alonso (Argentina) Claudia Jensen	
1/8/2025	(Argentina) Delfina Brea (Spain) Gemma Triay	6–3 / 6–4	(Spain) Marta Ortega (Spain) Tamara Icardo	

=== Semi-Finals ===
Men's

Date	Winners	Score	Opponent	Refs.
2/8/2025	(Argentina) Agustín Tapia (Spain) Arturo Coello	6–4 / 6–7 / 6–2	(Spain) Coki Nieto (Spain) Mike Yanguas	
2/8/2025	(Spain) Alejandro Galán (Argentina) Federico Chingotto	6–3 / 7–6	(Argentina) Franco Stupaczuk (Spain) Juan Lebrón	

Women's

Date	Winners	Score	Opponent	Refs.
2/8/2025	(Spain) Ariana Sánchez (Spain) Paula Josemaría	7–6 / 6–3	(Spain) Andrea Ustero (Portugal) Sofia Araújo	
2/8/2025	(Argentina) Delfina Brea (Spain) Gemma Triay	7–6 / 3–6 / 7–6	(Spain) Bea González (Spain) Claudia Fernández	

=== Finals ===
Men's

Date	Winners	Score	Opponent	Refs.
3/8/2025	(Argentina) Agustín Tapia (Spain) Arturo Coello	7–6 / 7–5	(Spain) Alejandro Galán (Argentina) Federico Chingotto	

Women's

Date	Winners	Score	Opponent	Refs.
3/8/2025	(Argentina) Delfina Brea (Spain) Gemma Triay	7–6 / 6–4	(Spain) Ariana Sánchez (Spain) Paula Josemaría	
