= 2020 WPT Vuelve a Madrid Open =

World Padel Tour tournament held in Madrid, Spain

- Date: 12 – 19 July
- Edition: 17th (Note: The first twelve editions were held under the organization of the Padel Pro Tour.)
- Category: Open
- Location: Madrid, Spain
- Venue: Madrid Arena

Champions
- Men's doubles: (Spain) Alejandro Galán (Spain) Juan Lebrón
- Women's doubles: (Spain) Bea González (Spain) Marta Ortega

Chronology

The 2020 Vuelve a Madrid Open (officially 2020 World Padel Tour Vuelve a Madrid Open) was the third tournament of the eight season organized by World Padel Tour, the most prestigious padel circuit at the time.

In the women's category, neither of the top two ranked pairs reached the final. The first finalists were the third-ranked pair, Bea González and Marta Ortega, who took advantage of the unexpected elimination of the world's number 1 pair, Alejandra Salazar and Ariana Sánchez, in the quarterfinals. Their opponents were the number 5 ranked pair, Elisabeth Amatriain and Patricia Llaguno, who eliminated the number 2 pair in the semifinals and were looking to end a title drought that had lasted since 2016. In the final, Bea and Marta defeated Amatriain and Llaguno in three sets, winning their first title of the season and their first in Madrid. With this victory, in addition to winning the first title of her career, Bea González also became the youngest player to win a title, at only 18 years old.

In the men's category, the world's number 1 pair reached their third consecutive final, but this time with a new opponent. The first finalists were Alejandro Galán and Juan Lebrón, who defeated Matías Díaz and Maxi Sánchez in the semi-final. Their rivals were Agustín Tapia and Fernando Belasteguín who, after eliminating the number 2 pair in the quarter-finals, Pablo Lima and Paquito Navarro, took advantage of the early elimination of the number 3 pair to reach the final. In the final, Galán and Lebrón defeated Belasteguín and Tapia in three sets, winning their second title of the season and their second title each in Madrid.

== Head-to-head record between teams ranked in the top 4 during the season ==
=== Men's ===
Record	Galán–Lebrón	Lima–Paquito	Sanyo–Stupaczuk	Díaz–Maxi
Galán–Lebrón	—	1–1	2–0	1–0
Lima–Paquito	1–1	—	—	1–0
Sanyo–Stupaczuk	0–2	—	—	—
Díaz–Maxi	0–1	0–1	—	—

=== Women's ===
Record	Ariana–Salazar	Josemaria–Marrero	Bea–Ortega	Gemma–Lucia	Former Pairs	Delfina–Nogueira
Ariana–Salazar	—	0–1	1–0	1–0		—
Josemaria–Marrero	1–0	—	—	1–1		—
Bea–Ortega	0–1	—	—	—		—
Gemma–Lucia	0–1	1–1	—	—		1–0
Former Pairs
Delfina–Nogueira	—	—	—	0–1		—

== Draws ==
=== Men's Bracket ===
Round of 32
1	(Spain) Galán / (Spain) Lebrón
Bye
Q	(Spain) G. Casal / (Spain) M. Quilez	6	1	5
Q	(Spain) Coello / (Spain) I. Ramírez	4	6	7
(Spain) A. Ruiz / (Spain) M. Piñeiro	6	6
Q	(Spain) E. Alonso / (Spain) J. Gutierrez	4	4
(Spain) A. Santana / (Spain) G. Rubio	2	5
7	(Argentina) F. Chingotto / (Argentina) J. Tello	6	7
6	(Spain) J. Ruiz / (Spain) U. Botello	6	6
(Brazil) L. Bergamini / (Argentina) M. Lamperti	7	7
(Argentina) A. Allemandi / (Spain) Momo	6	6
(Spain) E. Moreno / (Spain) J. Rico	4	3
LL	(Chile) J. Valdes / (Argentina) J. Restivo	4	6
(Argentina) A. Gutiérrez / (Argentina) C. Gutiérrez	6	7
Bye
4	(Argentina) M. Díaz / (Argentina) Maxi
3	(Argentina) Sanyo / (Argentina) Stupaczuk
Bye
(Argentina) A. Silingo / (Argentina) Di Nenno	6	6
(Spain) Á. Cepero / (Spain) P. Lijó	4	2
(Spain) Coki / (Spain) J. Rico	4	6	6
(Uruguay) D. Ramos / (Argentina) R. Méndez	6	2	3
(Argentina) F. Quiles / (Argentina) J.C. Belluati	3	7	4
8	(Brazil) L. Campagnolo / (Spain) J.M. Díaz	6	5	6
5	(Argentina) Belasteguín / (Argentina) Tapia	6	6
(Spain) J.G. Diestro / (Spain) V. Ruiz	4	4
(Spain) A. Blanco / (Spain) J. Martinez	6	7
(Spain) N. Gadea / (Argentina) S. Nerone	4	5
Q	(Spain) R. Rivera / (Spain) T. Bueno	7	6
(Spain) J. Garrido / (Spain) J. Mieres	6	4
Bye
2	(Brazil) Lima / (Spain) Paquito

Round of 16
1	(Spain) Galán / (Spain) Lebrón	6	7
(Spain) Coello / (Spain) I. Ramírez	4	6
(Spain) A. Ruiz / (Spain) M. Piñeiro	4	6	2
7	(Argentina) F. Chingotto / (Argentina) J. Tello	6	3	6
(Brazil) L. Bergamini / (Argentina) M. Lamperti	7	6
(Argentina) A. Allemandi / (Spain) Momo	6	4
(Argentina) A. Gutiérrez / (Argentina) C. Gutiérrez	3	2
4	(Argentina) M. Díaz / (Argentina) Maxi	6	6
3	(Argentina) Sanyo / (Argentina) Stupaczuk	4	6	2
(Argentina) A. Silingo / (Argentina) Di Nenno	6	2	6
(Spain) Coki / (Spain) J. Rico	6	6
8	(Brazil) L. Campagnolo / (Spain) J.M. Díaz	2	4
5	(Argentina) Belasteguín / (Argentina) Tapia	6	6
(Spain) A. Blanco / (Spain) J. Martinez	4	2
Q	(Spain) R. Rivera / (Spain) T. Bueno	1	3
2	(Brazil) Lima / (Spain) Paquito	6	6

Quarter-Final
1	(Spain) Galán / (Spain) Lebrón	6	6
7	(Argentina) F. Chingotto / (Argentina) J. Tello	3	2
(Brazil) L. Bergamini / (Argentina) M. Lamperti	5	6
4	(Argentina) M. Díaz / (Argentina) Maxi	7	7
(Argentina) A. Silingo / (Argentina) Di Nenno	4	6	6
(Spain) Coki / (Spain) J. Rico	6	4	3
5	(Argentina) Belasteguín / (Argentina) Tapia	6	6
2	(Brazil) Lima / (Spain) Paquito	2	4

Semi-Finals
1	(Spain) Galán / (Spain) Lebrón	6	6
4	(Argentina) M. Díaz / (Argentina) Maxi	1	2
(Argentina) A. Silingo / (Argentina) Di Nenno	6	3	2
5	(Argentina) Belasteguín / (Argentina) Tapia	3	6	6

Finals
1	(Spain) Galán / (Spain) Lebrón	4	6	6
5	(Argentina) Belasteguín / (Argentina) Tapia	6	1	4

=== Women's Bracket ===
Round of 32
1	(Spain) Ariana / (Spain) Salazar
Bye
(Spain) A. Cantin / (Spain) N. Rodríguez	6	6
Q	(France) L. Clergue / (France) L. Godallier	3	2
(Portugal) S. Araújo / (Argentina) V. Riera	6	6
(Spain) B. Caldera / (Spain) C. Goenaga	3	1
Q	(Spain) M. Pinacho / (Spain) S. Ruiz	2	2
8	(Spain) C. Navarro / (Argentina) C. Reiter	6	6
7	(Spain) Majo / (Spain) Mapi	6	6
(Spain) A.F. de Ossó / (Spain) L. Martínez	4	3
(Spain) C. Mesa / (Argentina) C. Paz	5	6	6
(France) A. Collombon / (Spain) N. Traviesa	7	3	4
(Argentina) A. Osoro / (Spain) T. Navarro	6	6
(Spain) L. Rufo / (Spain) M. Talavan	0	2
Bye
3	(Spain) Bea González / (Spain) M. Ortega
4	(Spain) Gemma / (Spain) L. Sainz
Bye
(Spain) A. Blanco / (Argentina) C. Tenorio	4	6	0
(Spain) L. Alonso / (Brazil) R. Piltcher	6	4	6
(Spain) A: Martinez / (Argentina) N. Brito	6	3	3
(Spain) A. Tapia / (Spain) J. Castelló	3	6	6
(Spain) A. Galán / (Spain) V. Iglesias	4	2
5	(Spain) E. Amatriain / (Spain) P. Llaguno	6	6
6	(Portugal) A.C. Nogueira / (Argentina) D. Brea	6	6
Q	(Spain) M. Lobo / (Spain) S. Bellver	1	0
(Spain) E. Carnicero / (Spain) M. Merino	6	1
(Spain) M. Villalba / (Spain) V. Virseda	7	6
(Spain) S. Hernández / (Spain) T. Icardo
Q	(Spain) M. Barajas / (Spain) P. Barajas
Bye
2	(Spain) M. Marrero / (Spain) P. Josemaría

Round of 16
1	(Spain) Ariana / (Spain) Salazar	4	6	6
(Spain) A. Cantin / (Spain) N. Rodríguez	6	2	2
(Portugal) S. Araújo / (Argentina) V. Riera	2	6	6
8	(Spain) C. Navarro / (Argentina) C. Reiter	6	4	1
7	(Spain) Majo / (Spain) Mapi	6	6
(Spain) C. Mesa / (Argentina) C. Paz	4	3
(Argentina) A. Osoro / (Spain) T. Navarro	1	7	3
3	(Spain) Bea González / (Spain) M. Ortega	6	5	6
4	(Spain) Gemma / (Spain) L. Sainz	6	6
(Spain) L. Alonso / (Brazil) R. Piltcher	1	1
(Spain) A. Tapia / (Spain) J. Castelló	0	1
5	(Spain) E. Amatriain / (Spain) P. Llaguno	6	6
6	(Portugal) A.C. Nogueira / (Argentina) D. Brea	5	7	4
(Spain) M. Villalba / (Spain) V. Virseda	7	5	6
(Spain) S. Hernández / (Spain) T. Icardo	5	6	5
2	(Spain) M. Marrero / (Spain) P. Josemaría	7	2	7

Quarter-Final
1	(Spain) Ariana / (Spain) Salazar	6	3
(Portugal) S. Araújo / (Argentina) V. Riera	7	6
7	(Spain) Majo / (Spain) Mapi	3	6	1
3	(Spain) Bea González / (Spain) M. Ortega	6	3	6
4	(Spain) Gemma / (Spain) L. Sainz	6	3	4
5	(Spain) E. Amatriain / (Spain) P. Llaguno	3	6	6
(Spain) M. Villalba / (Spain) V. Virseda	2	5
2	(Spain) M. Marrero / (Spain) P. Josemaría	6	7

Semi-Finals
(Portugal) S. Araújo / (Argentina) V. Riera	2	3
3	(Spain) Bea González / (Spain) M. Ortega	6	6
5	(Spain) E. Amatriain / (Spain) P. Llaguno	6	6
2	(Spain) M. Marrero / (Spain) P. Josemaría	4	3

Finals
3	(Spain) Bea González / (Spain) M. Ortega	5	6	6
5	(Spain) E. Amatriain / (Spain) P. Llaguno	7	1	1

== Results ==
=== Round of 32 ===
Men's
Date	Winners	Score	Opponent	Ref.
15/7/2020	(Spain) Arturo Coello (Spain) Iván Ramírez	4–6 / 6–1 / 7–5	(Spain) Guillermo Casal (Spain) Marc Quilez	
15/7/2020	(Spain) Alejandro Ruiz (Spain) Martin Sánchez Piñeiro	6–4 / 6–4	(Spain) Eduardo Alonso (Spain) Jorge Ruiz Gutiérrez	
15/7/2020	(Argentina) Federico Chingotto (Argentina) Juan Tello	6–2 / 7–5	(Spain) Aday Santana (Spain) Gonzalo Rubio	
15/7/2020	(Brazil) Lucas Bergamini (Argentina) Miguel Lamperti	7–6 / 7–6	(Spain) Javi Ruiz (Spain) Uri Botello	
15/7/2020	(Argentina) Adrián Allemandi (Spain) Momo González	6–4 / 6–3	(Spain) Ernesto Moreno (Spain) José Rico	
15/7/2020	(Argentina) Agustin Gutiérrez (Argentina) Cristian Gutiérrez	6–4 / 7–6	(Chile) Javier Valdes (Argentina) Juan Manuel Restivo	
15/7/2020	(Argentina) Agustin Gomez Silingo (Argentina) Martín Di Nenno	6–4 / 6–2	(Spain) Álvaro Cepero (Spain) Pablo Lijó	
15/7/2020	(Spain) Coki Nieto (Spain) Javi Rico	4–6 / 6–2 / 6–3	(Uruguay) Diego Ramos (Spain) Rafael Méndez	
15/7/2020	(Spain) Juan Martín Díaz (Brazil) Lucas Campagnolo	6–3 / 5–7 / 6–4	(Argentina) Federico Quiles (Argentina) Juan Cruz Belluati	
15/7/2020	(Argentina) Agustín Tapia (Argentina) Fernando Belasteguín	6–4 / 6–4	(Spain) José García Diestro (Spain) Victor Ruiz	
15/7/2020	(Spain) Adrián Blanco (Spain) Javier Martinez Vazquez	6–4 / 7–5	(Spain) Nacho Gadea (Argentina) Sebastián Nerone	
15/7/2020	(Spain) Rubén Rivera (Spain) Toni Bueno	7–6 / 6–4	(Spain) Javi Garrido (Spain) Juani Mieres	

Women's
Date	Winners	Score	Opponent	Ref.
15/7/2020	(Spain) Angela Caro Cantin (Spain) Nuria Rodríguez	6–3 / 6–2	(France) Laura Clergue (France) Léa Godallier	
15/7/2020	(Portugal) Sofia Araújo (Argentina) Virginia Riera	6–3 / 6–1	(Spain) Beatriz Caldera (Spain) Carmen Goenaga	
15/7/2020	(Spain) Carolina Navarro (Argentina) Cecilia Reiter	6–2 / 6–2	(Spain) María Pinacho Sánchez (Spain) Sara Ruiz	
15/7/2020	(Spain) Majo Sánchez (Spain) Mapi Sánchez	6–4 / 6–3	(Spain) Ana Fernández de Ossó (Spain) Lucía Martínez	
15/7/2020	(Spain) Carla Mesa (Argentina) Celeste Paz	5–7 / 6–3 / 6–4	(France) Alix Collombon (Spain) Nicole Traviesa Mola	
15/7/2020	(Argentina) Aranzazu Osoro (Spain) Teresa Navarro	6–0 / 6–2	(Spain) Lorena Rufo (Spain) Marta Talavan	
15/7/2020	(Spain) Lorena Alonso (Brazil) Raquel Piltcher	6–4 / 4–6 / 6–0	(Spain) Alicia Blanco Rojo (Argentina) Catalina Tenorio	
15/7/2020	(Spain) Anna Cortiles Tapia (Spain) Jessica Castelló	3–6 / 6–3 / 6–3	(Spain) Araceli Martinez (Argentina) Nela Brito	
15/7/2020	(Spain) Elisabeth Amatriain (Spain) Patricia Llaguno	6–4 / 6–2	(Spain) Alba Galán (Spain) Victoria Iglesias	
15/7/2020	(Portugal) Ana Catarina Nogueira (Argentina) Delfina Brea	6–1 / 6–0	(Spain) Marina Martinez Lobo (Spain) Sandra Bellver	
15/7/2020	(Spain) Maria Villalba (Spain) Verónica Virseda	7–6 / 6–1	(Spain) Esther Carnicero (Spain) Melania Merino	
15/7/2020	(Spain) Sandra Hernández (Spain) Tamara Icardo	6–1 / 6–1	(Spain) María Navarro Barajas (Spain) Pilar Navarro Barajas	

=== Round of 16 ===
Men's
Date	Winners	Score	Opponent	Ref.
16/7/2020	(Spain) Alejandro Galán (Spain) Juan Lebrón	6–4 / 7–6	(Spain) Arturo Coello (Spain) Iván Ramírez	
16/7/2020	(Argentina) Federico Chingotto (Argentina) Juan Tello	6–4 / 3–6 / 6–2	(Spain) Alejandro Ruiz (Spain) Martin Sánchez Piñeiro	
16/7/2020	(Brazil) Lucas Bergamini (Argentina) Miguel Lamperti	7–6 / 6–4	(Argentina) Adrián Allemandi (Spain) Momo González	
16/7/2020	(Spain) Matías Díaz (Argentina) Maxi Sánchez	6–3 / 6–2	(Argentina) Agustin Gutiérrez (Argentina) Cristian Gutiérrez	
16/7/2020	(Argentina) Agustin Gomez Silingo (Argentina) Martín Di Nenno	6–4 / 2–6 / 6–2	(Argentina) Franco Stupaczuk (Argentina) Sanyo Gutiérrez	
16/7/2020	(Spain) Coki Nieto (Spain) Javi Rico	6–2 / 6–4	(Spain) Juan Martín Díaz (Brazil) Lucas Campagnolo	
16/7/2020	(Argentina) Agustín Tapia (Argentina) Fernando Belasteguín	6–4 / 6–2	(Spain) Adrián Blanco (Spain) Javier Martinez Vazquez	
16/7/2020	(Brazil) Pablo Lima (Spain) Paquito Navarro	6–1 / 6–3	(Spain) Rubén Rivera (Spain) Toni Bueno	

Women's
Date	Winners	Score	Opponent	Ref.
16/7/2020	(Spain) Alejandra Salazar (Spain) Ariana Sánchez	4–6 / 6–2 / 6–2	(Spain) Angela Caro Cantin (Spain) Nuria Rodríguez	
16/7/2020	(Portugal) Sofia Araújo (Argentina) Virginia Riera	2–6 / 6–4 / 6–1	(Spain) Carolina Navarro (Argentina) Cecilia Reiter	
16/7/2020	(Spain) Majo Sánchez (Spain) Mapi Sánchez	6–4 / 6–3	(Spain) Carla Mesa (Argentina) Celeste Paz	
16/7/2020	(Spain) Bea González (Spain) Marta Ortega	6–1 / 5–7 / 6–3	(Argentina) Aranzazu Osoro (Spain) Teresa Navarro	
16/7/2020	(Spain) Gemma Triay (Spain) Lucia Sainz	6–1 / 6–1	(Spain) Lorena Alonso (Brazil) Raquel Piltcher	
16/7/2020	(Spain) Elisabeth Amatriain (Spain) Patricia Llaguno	6–0 / 6–1	(Spain) Anna Cortiles Tapia (Spain) Jessica Castelló	
16/7/2020	(Spain) Maria Villalba (Spain) Verónica Virseda	7–5 / 5–7 / 6–4	(Portugal) Ana Catarina Nogueira (Argentina) Delfina Brea	
16/7/2020	(Spain) Marta Marrero (Spain) Paula Josemaría	7–5 / 2–6 / 7–5	(Spain) Sandra Hernández (Spain) Tamara Icardo	

=== Quarter-Finals ===
Men's
Date	Winners	Score	Opponent	Ref.
17/7/2020	(Spain) Alejandro Galán (Spain) Juan Lebrón	6–3 / 6–2	(Argentina) Federico Chingotto (Argentina) Juan Tello	
17/7/2020	(Spain) Matías Díaz (Argentina) Maxi Sánchez	7–5 / 7–6	(Brazil) Lucas Bergamini (Argentina) Miguel Lamperti	
17/7/2020	(Argentina) Agustin Gomez Silingo (Argentina) Martín Di Nenno	4–6 / 6–4 / 6–3	(Spain) Coki Nieto (Spain) Javi Rico	
17/7/2020	(Argentina) Agustín Tapia (Argentina) Fernando Belasteguín	6–2 / 6–4	(Brazil) Pablo Lima (Spain) Paquito Navarro	

Women's
Date	Winners	Score	Opponent	Ref.
17/7/2020	(Portugal) Sofia Araújo (Argentina) Virginia Riera	7–6 / 6–3	(Spain) Alejandra Salazar (Spain) Ariana Sánchez	
17/7/2020	(Spain) Bea González (Spain) Marta Ortega	6–3 / 3–6 / 6–1	(Spain) Majo Sánchez (Spain) Mapi Sánchez	
17/7/2020	(Spain) Elisabeth Amatriain (Spain) Patricia Llaguno	3–6 / 6–3 / 6–4	(Spain) Gemma Triay (Spain) Lucia Sainz	
17/7/2020	(Spain) Marta Marrero (Spain) Paula Josemaría	6–2 / 7–5	(Spain) Maria Villalba (Spain) Verónica Virseda	

=== Semi-Finals ===
Men's
Date	Winners	Score	Opponent	Ref.
18/7/2020	(Spain) Alejandro Galán (Spain) Juan Lebrón	6–1 / 6–2	(Spain) Matías Díaz (Argentina) Maxi Sánchez	
18/7/2020	(Argentina) Agustín Tapia (Argentina) Fernando Belasteguín	3–6 / 6–3 / 6–2	(Argentina) Agustin Gomez Silingo (Argentina) Martín Di Nenno	

Women's
Date	Winners	Score	Opponent	Ref.
18/7/2020	(Spain) Bea González (Spain) Marta Ortega	6–2 / 6–3	(Portugal) Sofia Araújo (Argentina) Virginia Riera	
18/7/2020	(Spain) Elisabeth Amatriain (Spain) Patricia Llaguno	6–4 / 6–3	(Spain) Marta Marrero (Spain) Paula Josemaría	

=== Finals ===
Men's
Date	Winners	Score	Opponent	Ref.
19/7/2020	(Spain) Alejandro Galán (Spain) Juan Lebrón	4–6 / 6–1 / 6–4	(Argentina) Agustín Tapia (Argentina) Fernando Belasteguín	

Women's
Date	Winners	Score	Opponent	Ref.
19/7/2020	(Spain) Bea González (Spain) Marta Ortega	5–7 / 6–1 / 6–1	(Spain) Elisabeth Amatriain (Spain) Patricia Llaguno	
