= 2017 World Padel Tour =

Padel circuit in 2017

World Padel Tour 2017
Details
- Duration: 27 March – 17 December
- Edition: 5th
- Tournaments: 23
- Categories: Challenger (7); Open (11); Master (4); Masters Finals (1)

Achievements (singles)
- Most titles: Men's (Argentina) Fernando Belasteguín (Brazil) Pablo Lima (8); Women's (Spain) Mapi Sánchez Alayeto (Spain) Majo Sánchez Alayeto (9)
- Most finals: Men's (Argentina) Fernando Belasteguín (Brazil) Pablo Lima (14); Women's (Spain) Mapi Sánchez Alayeto (Spain) Majo Sánchez Alayeto (9)

The 2017 World Padel Tour was the fifth edition of the World Padel Tour, the most prestigious professional padel circuit in the world. In the male division, Fernando Belasteguín and Pablo Lima retained the number 1 rank for a third consecutive season. In the female division Mapi Sánchez Alayeto and Majo Sánchez Alayeto were crowned number one for the third time as a team.

== Tournaments and results ==
Open Master Challenger Master Final

Tournament	Date	Men's			Women's		
Tournament	Date	Winners	Score	Runners-up	Winners	Score	Runners-up
(Spain) Santander Open	27 March – 2 April	(Spain) Paquito Navarro (Argentina) Sanyo Gutiérrez	4–6 / 6–4 / 7–6	(Argentina) Fernando Belasteguín (Brazil) Pablo Lima	(Spain) Ariana Sánchez (Spain) Marta Ortega	6–4 / 7–6	(Spain) Elisabeth Amatriain (Spain) Patricia Llaguno
(Spain) Joma Memorial José Martínez Challenger	9 – 15 April	(Spain) Álvaro Cepéro (Argentina) Franco Stupaczuk	6–4 / 6–7 / 6–3	(Spain) Jordi Muñoz (Spain) Pablo Lijó	Not contested		
(United States) Miami Master	24 – 30 April	(Spain) Paquito Navarro (Argentina) Sanyo Gutiérrez	7–6 / 6–3	(Argentina) Fernando Belasteguín (Brazil) Pablo Lima	Not contested		
(Spain) A Coruña Open	8 – 14 May	(Argentina) Fernando Belasteguín (Brazil) Pablo Lima	7–5 / 6–3	(Spain) Paquito Navarro (Argentina) Sanyo Gutiérrez	(Spain) Mapi Sánchez Alayeto (Spain) Majo Sánchez Alayeto	6–4 / 6–2	(Spain) Alejandra Salazar (Spain) Marta Marrero
(Portugal) Lisbon Challenger	21 – 28 May	(Spain) Godo Díaz (Argentina) Lucho Capra	6–4 / 6–4	(Spain) Alex Ruiz (Argentina) Sebastian Nerone	Not contested		
(Spain) Barcelona Master	27 May – 4 June	(Argentina) Fernando Belasteguín (Brazil) Pablo Lima	6–3 / 6–1	(Spain) Paquito Navarro (Argentina) Sanyo Gutiérrez	(Spain) Mapi Sánchez Alayeto (Spain) Majo Sánchez Alayeto	6–4 / 3–6 / 6–1	(Spain) Gemma Triay (Spain) Lucía Sainz
(Spain) Joma Madrid Challenger	11 – 18 June	(Spain) Godo Díaz (Argentina) Lucho Capra	6–4 / 6–2	(Spain) Alejandro Galán (Argentina) Juan Cruz Belluati	Not contested		
(Spain) Valladolid Open	19 – 25 June	(Spain) Paquito Navarro (Argentina) Sanyo Gutiérrez	WO	(Argentina) Fernando Belasteguín (Brazil) Pablo Lima	(Spain) Mapi Sánchez Alayeto (Spain) Majo Sánchez Alayeto	7–6 / 4–5 / WO	(Spain) Alejandra Salazar (Spain) Marta Marrero
(Spain) Joma Murcia Challenger	25 June – 2 July	(Spain) Federico Quiles (Spain) Jordi Muñoz	6–3 / 7–6	(Spain) Alex Ruiz (Spain) Javier Concepción	(Spain) Ariana Sánchez (Spain) Marta Ortega	6–2 / 6–4	(Spain) Carolina Navarro (Argentina) Cecilia Reiter
(Spain) Mijas Open	3 – 9 July	(Argentina) Cristián Gutiérrez (Argentina) Franco Stupaczuk	5–7 / 6–4 / 6–4	(Spain) Matías Díaz (Argentina) Maxi Sánchez	(Spain) Mapi Sánchez Alayeto (Spain) Majo Sánchez Alayeto	6–2 / 7–6	(Spain) Catalina Tenorio (Spain) Marta Marrero
(Spain) Joma Cabrera de Mar Challenger	9 – 17 July	(Spain) Federico Quiles (Spain) Jordi Muñoz	6–0 / 7–5	(Spain) José Diestro (Spain) Martin Piñeiro	Not contested		
(Spain) Gran Canaria Open	24 – 30 July	(Argentina) Cristián Gutiérrez (Argentina) Franco Stupaczuk	7–5 / 6–1	(Spain) Matías Díaz (Argentina) Maxi Sánchez	Not contested		
(Spain) Alicante Open	21 – 27 August	(Argentina) Fernando Belasteguín (Brazil) Pablo Lima	6–3 / 3–6 / 6–3	(Spain) Paquito Navarro (Argentina) Sanyo Gutiérrez	(Spain) Mapi Sánchez Alayeto (Spain) Majo Sánchez Alayeto	6–3 / 7–6	(Spain) Catalina Tenorio (Spain) Marta Marrero
(Sweden) Helsingborg Challenger	27 August – 3 September	(Spain) Javier Concepcion (Spain) Matias Marina	6–4 / 6–1	(Argentina) Maxi Grabiel (Argentina) Ramiro Moyano	Not contested		
(Spain) Seville Open	4 – 10 September	(Spain) Paquito Navarro (Argentina) Sanyo Gutiérrez	6–4 / 6–2	(Argentina) Fernando Belasteguín (Brazil) Pablo Lima	(Spain) Mapi Sánchez Alayeto (Spain) Majo Sánchez Alayeto	6–3 / 6–1	(Spain) Catalina Tenorio (Spain) Marta Marrero
(France) Marselle Challenger	10 – 17 September	(Argentina) German Tamame (Spain) Ignacio Gadea	6–2 / 6–0	(Argentina) Maxi Grabiel (Argentina) Ramiro Moyano	Not contested		
Portugal Master	18 – 24 September	(Argentina) Fernando Belasteguín (Brazil) Pablo Lima	6–2 / 1–6 / 6–1	(Spain) Paquito Navarro (Argentina) Sanyo Gutiérrez	Not contested		
Andorra Open	25 September – 1 October	(Spain) Paquito Navarro (Argentina) Sanyo Gutiérrez	3–6 / 6–4 / 6–4	(Argentina) Fernando Belasteguín (Brazil) Pablo Lima	(Spain) Mapi Sánchez Alayeto (Spain) Majo Sánchez Alayeto	6–4 / 6–1	(Spain) Catalina Tenorio (Spain) Marta Marrero
(Spain) Granada Open	9 – 15 October	(Argentina) Fernando Belasteguín (Brazil) Pablo Lima	7–6 / 6–1	(Spain) Paquito Navarro (Argentina) Sanyo Gutiérrez	(Spain) Gemma Triay (Spain) Lucía Sainz	6–2 / 6–4	(Spain) Catalina Tenorio (Spain) Marta Marrero
(Spain) Zaragoza Open	23 – 29 October	(Argentina) Fernando Belasteguín (Brazil) Pablo Lima	6–4 / 6–2	(Spain) Matías Díaz (Argentina) Maxi Sánchez	(Spain) Gemma Triay (Spain) Lucía Sainz	6–4 / 3–6 / 7–5	(Spain) Elisabeth Amatriain (Spain) Patricia Llaguno
Argentina Master	6 – 12 November	(Argentina) Fernando Belasteguín (Brazil) Pablo Lima	6–1 / 7–6	(Spain) Paquito Navarro (Argentina) Sanyo Gutiérrez	Not contested		
(Spain) Euskadi Open	20 – 26 November	(Spain) Matías Díaz (Argentina) Maxi Sánchez	7–6 / 4–6 / 6–1	(Argentina) Fernando Belasteguín (Brazil) Pablo Lima	(Spain) Mapi Sánchez Alayeto (Spain) Majo Sánchez Alayeto	6–3 / 6–3	(Spain) Gemma Triay (Spain) Lucía Sainz
(Spain) Master Final	13 – 17 December	(Argentina) Fernando Belasteguín (Brazil) Pablo Lima	6–3 / 6–2	(Spain) Matías Díaz (Argentina) Maxi Sánchez	(Spain) Mapi Sánchez Alayeto (Spain) Majo Sánchez Alayeto	7–5 / 7–5	(Spain) Ariana Sánchez (Spain) Marta Ortega

== End of season ranking ==
Male

2017 Men's Ranking			Tournaments Won			
N.º	Name	Points	Open	Master	Master Final	Total
1	(Argentina) Fernando Belasteguín	14.600	4	3	1	8
1	(Brazil) Pablo Lima	14.600	4	3	1	8
3	(Spain) Paquito Navarro	11.965	4	1	0	5
3	(Argentina) Sanyo Gutiérrez	11.965	4	1	0	5
5	(Spain) Matías Díaz	8.060	1	0	0	1
5	(Argentina) Maxi Sánchez	8.060	1	0	0	1
7	(Argentina) Franco Stupaczuk	6.400	2	0	0	2
8	(Argentina) Cristián Gutiérrez	6.280	2	0	0	2
9	(Argentina) Miguel Lamperti	4.320	0	0	0	0
10	(Spain) Alejandro Galán	3.409	0	0	0	0
10	(Argentina) Juan Cruz Belluati	3.409	0	0	0	0
12	(Spain) Juani Mieres	3.220	0	0	0	0
13	(Spain) Godo Díaz	2.815	0	0	0	0
13	(Argentina) Lucho Capra	2.815	0	0	0	0
15	(Spain) Álvaro Cepero	2.730	0	0	0	0

Female

2017 Women's Ranking				Tournaments Won		
N.º	Name	Points	Open	Master	Master Final	Total
1	(Spain) Majo Sánchez Alayeto	11.420	7	1	1	9
1	(Spain) Mapi Sánchez Alayeto	11.420	7	1	1	9
3	(Spain) Marta Marrero	6.965	0	0	0	0
4	(Spain) Gemma Triay	6.785	2	0	0	2
4	(Spain) Lucía Sainz	6.785	2	0	0	2
6	(Spain) Catalina Tenorio	6.175	0	0	0	0
7	(Spain) Ariana Sánchez	4.930	1	0	0	1
7	(Spain) Marta Ortega	4.930	1	0	0	1
9	(Spain) Elisabeth Amatriain	4.700	0	0	0	0
9	(Spain) Patricia Llaguno	4.700	0	0	0	0
11	(Spain) Victoria Iglesias	3.290	0	0	0	0
12	(Spain) Teresa Navarro	2.455	0	0	0	0
13	(Spain) Carolina Navarro	2.440	0	0	0	0
13	(Argentina) Cecilia Reiter	2.440	0	0	0	0
15	(Spain) Alejandra Salazar	2.170	0	0	0	0
