= 2015 World Padel Tour =

Padel circuit in 2015

World Padel Tour 2015
Details
- Duration: 23 March – 20 December
- Edition: 3rd
- Tournaments: 20
- Categories: Challenger (4); Open (10); Master (5); Masters Finals (1)

Achievements (singles)
- Most titles: Men's (Argentina) Fernando Belasteguín (13); Women's (Spain) Mapi Sánchez Alayeto (Spain) Majo Sánchez Alayeto (7)
- Most finals: Men's (Argentina) Fernando Belasteguín (13); Women's (Spain) Mapi Sánchez Alayeto (Spain) Majo Sánchez Alayeto (9)

The 2015 World Padel Tour was the third edition of the World Padel Tour, the most prestigious professional padel circuit in the world. In its third edition, thirteen time number 1 ranked Fernando Belasteguín and Pablo Lima in their first year together were crowned number 1. In the female division Mapi Sánchez Alayeto and Majo Sánchez Alayeto were crowned number one in WPT for the second consecutive year.

== Tournaments and results ==
Open Master Challenger Master Final

Tournament	Date	Men's			Women's		
Tournament	Date	Winners	Score	Runners-up	Winners	Score	Runners-up
(Spain) Barcelona Master	23 – 29 March	(Spain) Matías Díaz (Spain) Paquito Navarro	6–1 / 6–2	(Argentina) David Gutiérrez (Argentina) Lucho Capra	(Spain) Mapi Sánchez Alayeto (Spain) Majo Sánchez Alayeto	4–6 / 6–2 / 7–5	(Spain) Catalina Tenorio (Spain) Victoria Iglesias
(Spain) San Fernando Open	6 – 12 April	(Argentina) Fernando Belasteguín (Spain) Willy Lahoz	6–4 / 6–3	(Spain) Matías Díaz (Spain) Paquito Navarro	(Spain) Alejandra Salazar (Spain) Marta Marrero	4–6 / 7–6 / 7–5	(Spain) Mapi Sánchez Alayeto (Spain) Majo Sánchez Alayeto
(Spain) Valencia Challenger	12 – 19 April	(Spain) Godo Díaz (Argentina) Ramiro Moyano	6–2 / 7–6	(Spain) Javier Concepción (Spain) Uri Botello	Not contested		
(Spain) Isla de La Palma Open	20 – 26 April	(Argentina) Fernando Belasteguín (Spain) Willy Lahoz	6–2 / 7–6	(Spain) Matías Díaz (Spain) Paquito Navarro	Not contested		
(Spain) Mérida Open	4 – 10 May	Cancelled			Cancelled		
(Spain) Cordoba Challenger	16 – 23 May	(Spain) Alejandro Ruiz (Spain) Matias Marina	6–7 / 6–4 / 6–3	(Spain) Javier Concepcion (Spain) Uri Botello	Not contested		
Argentina Open	1 – 7 June	(Argentina) Fernando Belasteguín (Brazil) Pablo Lima	5–7 / 6–2 / 6–2	(Argentina) Maxi Sánchez (Argentina) Sanyo Gutiérrez	Not contested		
(Spain) Valladolid Open	15 – 21 June	(Argentina) Fernando Belasteguín (Brazil) Pablo Lima	7–6 / 6–7 / 7–6	(Spain) Matías Díaz (Spain) Paquito Navarro	(Spain) Mapi Sánchez Alayeto (Spain) Majo Sánchez Alayeto	7–6 / 6–4	(Spain) Alejandra Salazar (Spain) Marta Marrero
(Spain) Madrid Challenger	22 – 28 June	(Spain) Godo Díaz (Argentina) Ramiro Moyano	6–1 / 6–7 / 6–1	(Spain) Pedro Alonso Martinez (Argentina) Matias Nicoletti	Not contested		
(Spain) Chiclana Open	28 June – 5 July	Canceled			Canceled		
(Spain) Palma de Mallorca Open	15 – 19 July	(Argentina) Fernando Belasteguín (Brazil) Pablo Lima	6–4 / 6–0	(Spain) Juan Martín Díaz (Argentina) Maxi Sánchez	Not contested		
(Spain) Málaga Master	27 July – 2 August	(Argentina) Fernando Belasteguín (Brazil) Pablo Lima	7–6 / 6–3	(Spain) Juan Martín Díaz (Argentina) Maxi Sánchez	(Spain) Mapi Sánchez Alayeto (Spain) Majo Sánchez Alayeto	7–5 / 6–1	(Spain) Alejandra Salazar (Spain) Marta Marrero
(Spain) La Nucía Open	17 – 23 August	(Argentina) Fernando Belasteguín (Brazil) Pablo Lima	7–6 / 7–6	(Spain) Juan Martín Díaz (Argentina) Maxi Sánchez	(Spain) Mapi Sánchez Alayeto (Spain) Majo Sánchez Alayeto	7–6 / 6–4	(Spain) Elisabet Amatriaín (Spain) Patricia Llaguno
(Monaco) Montecarlo Master	7 – 13 September	(Argentina) Fernando Belasteguín (Brazil) Pablo Lima	6–3 / 6–1	(Spain) Matías Díaz (Spain) Paquito Navarro	Not contested		
(Spain) Madrid Open	14 – 20 de septiembre	(Spain) Juani Mieres (Argentina) Sanyo Gutiérrez	6–3 / 7–6	(Spain) Matías Díaz (Spain) Paquito Navarro	(Spain) Mapi Sánchez Alayeto (Spain) Majo Sánchez Alayeto	6–3 / 6–7 / 7–5	(Spain) Alejandra Salazar (Spain) Marta Marrero
(Spain) Seville Open	28 September – 4 October	(Argentina) Fernando Belasteguín (Brazil) Pablo Lima	6–2 / 6–0	(Spain) Juani Mieres (Argentina) Sanyo Gutiérrez	Not contested		
(Spain) A Coruña Open	12 – 18 October	(Argentina) Fernando Belasteguín (Brazil) Pablo Lima	6–4 / 6–4	(Spain) Juan Martín Díaz (Argentina) Maxi Sánchez	(Spain) Mapi Sánchez Alayeto (Spain) Majo Sánchez Alayeto	6–4 / 6–4	(Spain) Patricia Llaguno (Spain) Elisabet Amatriaín
(United Arab Emirates) Dubai Master	26 October – 1 November	(Argentina) Fernando Belasteguín (Brazil) Pablo Lima	6–1 / 6–2	(Spain) Juani Mieres (Argentina) Sanyo Gutiérrez	(Spain) Mapi Sánchez Alayeto (Spain) Majo Sánchez Alayeto	6–2 / 3–6 / 6–4	(Spain) Alejandra Salazar (Spain) Marta Marrero
(Spain) Euskadi Open	2 – 8 November	(Argentina) Fernando Belasteguín (Brazil) Pablo Lima	7–5 / 6–4	(Spain) Juani Mieres (Argentina) Sanyo Gutiérrez	Not contested		
(Spain) Barcelona Challenger	16 – 22 November	(Argentina) Franco Stupaczuk (Argentina) Martin Di Nenno	6–1 / 6–1	(Spain) Juan Lebrón (Brazil) Marcello Jardim	Not contested		
(Spain) Valencia Master	23 – 30 November	(Argentina) Fernando Belasteguín (Brazil) Pablo Lima	6–2 / 6–1	(Argentina) Adrián Allemandi (Argentina) Miguel Lamperti	(Spain) Alejandra Salazar (Spain) Marta Marrero	6–4 / 6–4	(Spain) Carolina Navarro (Argentina) Cecilia Reiter
(Spain) Master Final	16 – 20 December	(Spain) Juan Martín Díaz (Argentina) Maxi Sánchez	2–6 / 6–4 / 6–1	(Argentina) Maxi Grabiel (Argentina) Ramiro Moyano	(Spain) Alejandra Salazar (Spain) Marta Marrero	6–2 / 6–3	(Spain) Mapi Sánchez Alayeto (Spain) Majo Sánchez Alayeto

== End of season ranking ==
Male

2015 Men's Ranking			Tournaments Won			
N.º	Name	Points	Open	Master	Master Final	Total
1	(Argentina) Fernando Belasteguín	15.540	9	4	0	13
2	(Brazil) Pablo Lima	13.540	7	4	0	11
3	(Spain) Paquito Navarro	8.400	1	0	0	1
3	(Spain) Matías Díaz	8.400	1	0	0	1
5	(Argentina) Sanyo Gutiérrez	7.025	1	0	0	1
6	(Spain) Juani Mieres	6.880	1	0	0	1
7	(Argentina) Maxi Sánchez	6.715	0	0	1	1
8	(Spain) Juan Martín Díaz	6.570	0	0	1	1
9	(Argentina) Adrián Allemandi	4.185	0	0	0	0
9	(Argentina) Miguel Lamperti	4.185	0	0	0	0
11	(Spain) Guillermo Lahoz	4.155	2	0	0	2
12	(Argentina) Agustín Gómez Silingo	3.255	0	0	0	0
13	(Argentina) Cristián Gutiérrez	2.840	0	0	0	0
14	(Argentina) Ramiro Moyano	2.715	0	0	0	0
15	(Spain) Aday Santana	2.535	0	0	0	0
16	(Argentina) Maxi Grabiel	2.385	0	0	0	0
17	(Argentina) Federico Quiles	2.265	0	0	0	0
18	(Argentina) Gabriel Reca	2.180	0	0	0	0
18	(Argentina) Seba Nerone	2.180	0	0	0	0
20	(Spain) Jordi Muñoz	2.025	0	0	0	0

Female

2015 Women's Ranking			Tournaments Won			
N.º	Name	Points	Open	Master	Master Final	Total
1	(Spain) María Pilar Sánchez Alayeto	8.140	3	4	0	7
1	(Spain) María José Sánchez Alayeto	8.140	3	4	0	7
3	(Spain) Alejandra Salazar	5.900	1	1	1	3
3	(Spain) Marta Marrero	5.900	1	1	1	3
5	(Spain) Elisabeth Amatriain	4.540	0	0	0	0
5	(Spain) Patricia Llaguno	4.540	0	0	0	0
7	(Spain) Catalina Tenorio	2.940	0	0	0	0
7	(Argentina) Cecilia Reiter	2.940	0	0	0	0
7	(Spain) Victoria Iglesias	2.940	0	0	0	0
10	(Spain) Carolina Navarro	2.760	0	0	0	0
11	(Spain) Gemma Triay	1.980	0	0	0	0
11	(Argentina) Paula Eyheraguibel	1.980	0	0	0	0
13	(Spain) Marta Ortega	1.890	0	0	0	0
15	(Argentina) Nélida Brito	1.645	0	0	0	0
15	(Spain) Lorena Alonso de Lera	1.645	0	0	0	0
17	(Spain) Alba Galán	1.195	0	0	0	0
17	(Spain) María del Carmen Villalba	1.195	0	0	0	0
19	(Portugal) Ana Catarina Nogueira	900	0	0	0	0
19	(Spain) Sandra Hernández	900	0	0	0	0
