= 2022 World Padel Tour =

Tenth edition of the World Padel Tour

Details
- Duration: 21 February – 18 December
- Edition: 10th
- Tournaments: 28
- Categories: Challenger (5); Open (17); Master (4); Challenger Finals (1); Masters Finals (1)

Achievements (singles)
- Most titles: Male (Spain) Alejandro Galán (Spain) Juan Lebrón (10); Female (Spain) Alejandra Salazar (Spain) Gemma Triay (12)
- Most finals: Male (Spain) Alejandro Galán (Spain) Juan Lebrón (15); Female (Spain) Ariana Sánchez (Spain) Paula Josemaría (18)

The 2022 World Padel Tour was the tenth edition of the World Padel Tour, the most prestigious professional padel circuit in the world. In the male division, Alejandro Galán and Juan Lebrón retained the number 1 spot for a third year, with Lebrón becoming the third player since the foundation of Padel Pro Tour, after Fernando Belasteguín and Juan Martín Díaz, to keep the first ranking spot for four consecutive years. In the female division Alejandra Salazar and Gemma Triay were crowned number one for a second consecutive year, their third individually.

This edition was held throughout 2022, with 28 tournaments played in twelve countries, making it the most international edition in the history of the World Padel Tour up to that point. All tournaments had both men's and women's categories except one.

== Schedule ==
The 2022 season calendar was unveiled on January 21st, and it highlighted a large number of international tournaments on the circuit, including the first time a World Padel Tour (WPT) tournament was held in France, totaling 12 countries, plus an exhibition in Finland, which increased the number of countries hosting the World Padel Tour to thirteen, although it ended up being 12.

On February 2nd, the "Challenger" tournaments were added, including the first "Challenger Final" in history in Valencia. A few days later, changes were announced. Due to health restrictions in Sweden, the Stockholm Open was postponed to September, replacing the Toledo Challenger scheduled for those dates. Furthermore, the Valencia Challenger Final became a regular Challenger event, with the Final Challenger moving to Córdoba, Spain.

Mid-season, the cancellation of the Sardinia Open in Italy was announced, and in September the Middle East Master, which was to be held in Saudi Arabia, was postponed to 2023 to be held in Abu Dhabi.

As a final modification, the Challenger Final venue was changed again, this time definitively to Menorca, although the pavilion (within Menorca) was changed shortly afterwards.

== Tournaments and results ==
Open Master Challenger Challenger Final Master Final

Tournament	Date	Men's			Women's		
Tournament	Date	Winners	Score	Runners-up	Winners	Score	Runners-up
(United States) Miami Open	21 – 27 February	(Spain) Arturo Coello (Argentina) Fernando Belasteguín	6–3 / 7–6	(Spain) Javi Garrido (Brazil) Lucas Campagnolo	(Spain) Alejandra Salazar (Spain) Gemma Triay	6–2 / 6–2	(Spain) Ariana Sánchez (Spain) Paula Josemaría
(Spain) Reus Open	7 – 13 March	(Argentina) Agustín Tapia (Argentina) Sanyo Gutiérrez	6–2 / 6–2	(Spain) Alejandro Galán (Spain) Juan Lebrón	(Spain) Alejandra Salazar (Spain) Gemma Triay	6–3 / 6–7 / 6–1	(Spain) Ariana Sánchez (Spain) Paula Josemaría
(Spain) Vigo Open	21 – 27 March	(Argentina) Martín Di Nenno (Spain) Paquito Navarro	2–6 / 6–3 / 6–4	(Spain) Alejandro Galán (Spain) Juan Lebrón	(Spain) Ariana Sánchez (Spain) Paula Josemaría	7–5 / 6–3	(Spain) Alejandra Salazar (Spain) Gemma Triay
(Spain) Getafe Challenger	28 March – 3 April	(Spain) Jon Sanz (Argentina) Miguel Lamperti	6–7 / 7–5 / 6–3	(Spain) Javier Martínez (Spain) Martín Piñeiro	(Spain) Bea González (Spain) Marta Ortega	6–4 / 6–1	(Spain) Carla Mesa (Argentina) Claudia Jensen
(Spain) Alicante Open	4 – 10 April	(Spain) Alejandro Galán (Spain) Juan Lebrón	6–2 / 6–3	(Argentina) Martín Di Nenno (Spain) Paquito Navarro	(Spain) Alejandra Salazar (Spain) Gemma Triay	6–2 / 3–6 / 6–4	(Spain) Ariana Sánchez (Spain) Paula Josemaría
(Spain) Albacete Challenger	25 April – 1 May	(Spain) Javi Garrido (Brazil) Lucas Campagnolo	6–4 / 7–6	(Spain) Coki Nieto (Spain) Mike Yanguas	(Spain) Bea González (Spain) Marta Ortega	3–6 / 6–3 / 6–1	(Spain) Mapi Sánchez Alayeto (Spain) Majo Sánchez Alayeto
(Belgium) Brussels Open	2 – 8 May	(Spain) Alejandro Galán (Spain) Juan Lebrón	6–3 / 6–3	(Argentina) Franco Stupaczuk (Brazil) Pablo Lima	(Spain) Alejandra Salazar (Spain) Gemma Triay	4–6 / 6–3 / 6–0	(Spain) Patricia Llaguno (Argentina) Virginia Riera
(Denmark) Danish Open	16 – 22 May	(Argentina) Agustín Tapia (Argentina) Sanyo Gutiérrez	5–7 / 7–5 / 6–0	(Argentina) Lucho Capra (Argentina) Maxi Sánchez	(Spain) Bea González (Spain) Marta Ortega	6–2 / 6–1	(Spain) Mapi Sánchez Alayeto (Portugal) Sofia Araújo
(Spain) Mallorca Challenger	23 – 29 May	(Spain) Eduardo Alonso (Argentina) Miguel Lamperti	6–4 / 7–5	(Spain) Antón Sans (Spain) Javi Garrido	(Spain) Lucía Sainz (Spain) Marta Marrero	4–6 / 6–1 / 6–1	(France) Alix Collombon (Spain) Jessica Castelló
(Spain) Marbella Master	30 May – 5 June	(Spain) Alejandro Galán (Spain) Juan Lebrón	6–2 / 6–4	(Spain) Alejandro Ruiz (Spain) Momo González	(Spain) Ariana Sánchez (Spain) Paula Josemaría	4–6 / 6–3 / 6–3	(Spain) Bárbara Las Heras (Spain) Verónica Virseda
(Austria) Vienna Open	6 – 12 June	(Argentina) Agustín Tapia (Argentina) Sanyo Gutiérrez	6–1 / 0–6 / 7–6	(Spain) Alejandro Galán (Spain) Juan Lebrón	(Spain) Ariana Sánchez (Spain) Paula Josemaría	4–6 / 6–4 / 6–3	(Spain) Alejandra Salazar (Spain) Gemma Triay
(France) French Open	13 – 19 June	(Argentina) Franco Stupaczuk (Brazil) Pablo Lima	7–6 / 6–4	(Spain) Alejandro Galán (Spain) Juan Lebrón	(Spain) Alejandra Salazar (Spain) Gemma Triay	7–6 / 6–4	(Spain) Ariana Sánchez (Spain) Paula Josemaría
(Spain) Valladolid Master	20 – 26 June	(Spain) Alejandro Galán (Spain) Juan Lebrón	6–4 / 7–6	(Spain) Arturo Coello (Argentina) Fernando Belasteguín	(Spain) Alejandra Salazar (Spain) Gemma Triay	6–3 / 3–6 / 6–0	(Spain) Ariana Sánchez (Spain) Paula Josemaría
(Spain) Valencia Open	4 – 10 July	(Argentina) Agustín Tapia (Argentina) Sanyo Gutiérrez	2–6 / 7–5 / 6–4	(Spain) Alejandro Galán (Spain) Juan Lebrón	(Spain) Alejandra Salazar (Spain) Gemma Triay	6–4 / 4–6 / 7–6	(Argentina) Delfina Brea (Spain) Tamara Icardo
(Spain) Málaga Open	18 – 24 July	(Argentina) Agustín Tapia (Argentina) Sanyo Gutiérrez	7–6 / 6–4	(Argentina) Franco Stupaczuk (Brazil) Pablo Lima	(Spain) Ariana Sánchez (Spain) Paula Josemaría	6–3 / 6–3	(Spain) Alejandra Salazar (Spain) Gemma Triay
(Spain) Calanda Challenger	22 – 28 August	(Spain) Coki Nieto (Spain) Mike Yanguas	6–4 / 6–4	(Spain) Jon Sanz (Argentina) Miguel Lamperti	(Spain) Bárbara las Heras (Spain) Verónica Virseda	6–3 / 6–0	(Spain) Mapi Sánchez Alayeto (Spain) Majo Sánchez Alayeto
Portugal Open	5 – 11 September	(Spain) Alejandro Galán (Spain) Juan Lebrón	6–2 / 6–7 / 6–1	(Argentina) Agustín Tapia (Argentina) Sanyo Gutiérrez	(Spain) Ariana Sánchez (Spain) Paula Josemaría	7–5 / 1–0 / WO	(Spain) Bea González (Spain) Marta Ortega
(Sweden) Swedish Open	12 – 18 September	(Spain) Alejandro Galán (Spain) Juan Lebrón	6–7 / 6–2 / 6–1	(Argentina) Martín Di Nenno (Spain) Paquito Navarro	(Spain) Ariana Sánchez (Spain) Paula Josemaría	6–1 / 6–1	(Spain) Alejandra Salazar (Spain) Gemma Triay
(Spain) Madrid Master	19 – 25 September	(Spain) Arturo Coello (Argentina) Fernando Belasteguín	6–4 / 6–2	(Spain) Álex Ruiz (Spain) Momo González	(Spain) Ariana Sánchez (Spain) Paula Josemaría	4–6 / 6–2 / 6–1	(Argentina) Aranzazu Osoro (Spain) Victoria Iglesias
(Netherlands) Amsterdam Open	26 September – 2 October	(Spain) Arturo Coello (Argentina) Fernando Belasteguín	6–2 / 7–5	(Argentina) Franco Stupaczuk (Brazil) Pablo Lima	(Spain) Bea González (Spain) Marta Ortega	6–4 / 2–6 / 6–1	(Spain) Ariana Sánchez (Spain) Paula Josemaría
(Spain) Santander Open	3 – 9 October	(Argentina) Martín Di Nenno (Spain) Paquito Navarro	6–2 / 6–0	(Spain) Arturo Coello (Argentina) Fernando Belasteguín	(Spain) Alejandra Salazar (Spain) Gemma Triay	6–2 / 6–1	(Spain) Ariana Sánchez (Spain) Paula Josemaría
(Spain) Menorca Open	17 – 23 October	(Spain) Alejandro Galán (Spain) Juan Lebrón	6–4 / 4–6 / 6–2	(Spain) Francisco Gil (Argentina) Ramiro Moyano	(Spain) Alejandra Salazar (Spain) Gemma Triay	6–1 / 7–5	(Spain) Ariana Sánchez (Spain) Paula Josemaría
(Spain) Torrent Challenger	31 October – 6 November	(Spain) Coki Nieto (Spain) Jon Sanz	6–1 / 6–0	(Argentina) Lucho Capra (Argentina) Miguel Lamperti	(Spain) Mapi Sánchez Alayeto (Spain) Majo Sánchez Alayeto	6–0 / 6–7 / 6–1	(Spain) Claudia Fernández (Spain) Marta Marrero
(Sweden) Malmö Open	7 – 13 November	(Spain) Alejandro Galán (Spain) Juan Lebrón	4–6 / 6–1 / 6–2	(Argentina) Agustín Tapia (Argentina) Sanyo Gutiérrez	(Spain) Alejandra Salazar (Spain) Gemma Triay	6–4 / 7–5	(Spain) Ariana Sánchez (Spain) Paula Josemaría
Argentina Master	14 – 20 November	(Spain) Alejandro Galán (Spain) Juan Lebrón	7–6 / 6–2	(Spain) Arturo Coello (Argentina) Fernando Belasteguín	Not contested		
Mexico Open	21 – 27 November	(Argentina) Juan Tello (Spain) Paquito Navarro	7–6 / 1–6 / 7–5	(Argentina) Franco Stupaczuk (Brazil) Pablo Lima	(Spain) Alejandra Salazar (Spain) Gemma Triay	6–3 / 7–6	(Spain) Ariana Sánchez (Spain) Paula Josemaría
(Spain) Menorca Challenger Final	1 – 4 December	(Spain) Javi Martínez (Spain) Rafa Méndez	6–4 / 6–4	(Spain) José Diestro (Spain) Pincho Fernández	(Spain) Bárbara las Heras (Spain) Verónica Virseda	6–3 / 6–2	(Spain) Carla Mesa (Spain) Lucía Sainz
(Spain) Master Final	15 – 18 December	(Spain) Alejandro Galán (Spain) Juan Lebrón	6–4 / 6–7 / 6–2	(Argentina) Federico Chingotto (Argentina) Martín Di Nenno	(Spain) Alejandra Salazar (Spain) Gemma Triay	3–6 / 6–4 / 6–4	(Spain) Ariana Sánchez (Spain) Paula Josemaría

== End of season ranking ==
Male

2022 Men's Ranking			Tournaments Won			
N.º	Name	Points	Open	Master	Master Final	Total
1	(Spain) Alejandro Galán	16.720	6	3	1	10
1	(Spain) Juan Lebrón	16.720	6	3	1	10
3	(Argentina) Agustín Tapia	10.610	5	0	0	5
3	(Argentina) Sanyo Gutiérrez	10.610	5	0	0	5
5	(Spain) Arturo Coello	9.875	2	1	0	3
5	(Argentina) Fernando Belasteguín	9.875	2	1	0	3
7	(Spain) Paquito Navarro	8.420	3	0	0	3
8	(Argentina) Martín Di Nenno	8.145	2	0	0	2
9	(Argentina) Franco Stupaczuk	7.380	1	0	0	1
10	(Argentina) Juan Tello	7.130	1	0	0	1
11	(Brazil) Pablo Lima	7.040	1	0	0	1
12	(Argentina) Federico Chingotto	6.465	0	0	0	0
13	(Spain) Alejandro Ruíz	5.950	0	0	0	0
14	(Spain) Momo González	5.210	0	0	0	0
15	(Argentina) Lucho Capra	4.536	0	0	0	0
16	(Argentina) Maxi Sánchez	4.493	0	0	0	0

Female

2022 Women's Ranking			Tournaments Won			
N.º	Name	Points	Open	Master	Master Final	Total
1	(Spain) Alejandra Salazar	16.530	10	1	1	12
1	(Spain) Gemma Triay	16.530	10	1	1	12
3	(Spain) Ariana Sánchez	16.195	5	2	0	7
3	(Spain) Paula Josemaría	16.195	5	2	0	7
5	(Spain) Beatriz González	8.463	2	0	0	2
5	(Spain) Marta Ortega	8.463	2	0	0	2
7	(Argentina) Virginia Riera	5.625	0	0	0	0
8	(Spain) Patricia Llaguno	5.410	0	0	0	0
9	(Spain) Marta Marrero	5.212	0	0	0	0
10	(Spain) Lucía Sainz	5.079	0	0	0	0
11	(Spain) Victoria Iglesias	5.038	0	0	0	0
12	(Argentina) Aranzazu Osoro	4.996	0	0	0	0
13	(Spain) Bárbara Las Heras	4.885	0	0	0	0
13	(Spain) Verónica Virseda	4.885	0	0	0	0
15	(Spain) Mapi Sánchez Alayeto	4.870	0	0	0	0
16	(Spain) Majo Sánchez Alayeto	4.275	0	0	0	0
