= 2016 World Padel Tour =

Padel circuit in 2016

World Padel Tour 2016
Details
- Duration: 28 March – 18 December
- Edition: 4th
- Tournaments: 20
- Categories: Challenger (4); Open (11); Master (4); Masters Finals (1)

Achievements (singles)
- Most titles: Male (Argentina) Fernando Belasteguín (Brazil) Pablo Lima (12); Female (Spain) Alejandra Salazar (Spain) Marta Marrero (7)
- Most finals: Male (Argentina) Fernando Belasteguín (Brazil) Pablo Lima (13); Female (Spain) Alejandra Salazar (Spain) Marta Marrero (10)

The 2016 World Padel Tour was the fourth edition of the World Padel Tour, the most prestigious professional padel circuit in the world. In the male division, Fernando Belasteguín and Pablo Lima retained the number 1 rank for a second consecutive season. In the female division Alejandra Salazar and Marta Marrero were crowned number one for the first time as a pair.

== Tournaments and results ==
Open Master Challenger Master Final

Tournament	Date	Men's			Women's			Prize Money
Tournament	Date	Winners	Score	Runners-up	Winners	Score	Runners-up	Prize Money
(Spain) Gijón Open	28 March – 3 April	(Argentina) Fernando Belasteguín (Brazil) Pablo Lima	6–1 / 6–4	(Argentina) Maxi Sánchez (Spain) Matías Díaz	Not contested			€81.634
(Spain) Valencia Master	18 – 24 April	(Spain) Paquito Navarro (Argentina) Sanyo Gutiérrez	7–6 / 7–6	(Spain) Matías Díaz (Argentina) Maxi Sánchez	(Spain) Alejandra Salazar (Spain) Marta Marrero	6–2 / 7–6	(Spain) Mapi Sánchez Alayeto (Spain) Majo Sánchez Alayeto	€123.000
(Spain) Barcelona Master	2 May – 8 May	(Argentina) Fernando Belasteguín (Brazil) Pablo Lima	6–2 / 6–3	(Argentina) Cristián Gutiérrez (Spain) Juan Martín Díaz	(Spain) Elisabeth Amatriain (Spain) Patricia Llaguno	6–1 / 4–6 / 6–2	(Spain) Carolina Navarro (Argentina) Cecilia Reiter	€123.000
(Spain) Las Rozas Open	23 – 29 May	(Argentina) Fernando Belasteguín (Brazil) Pablo Lima	6–1 / 6–2	(Spain) Paquito Navarro (Argentina) Sanyo Gutiérrez	(Spain) Alejandra Salazar (Spain) Marta Marrero	6–3 / 2–6 / 6–1	(Spain) Mapi Sánchez Alayeto (Spain) Majo Sánchez Alayeto	€105.114
(Portugal) Lisbon Challenger	30 May – 5 June	(Spain) Alejandro Ruiz (Spain) Matias Marina	6–3 / 6–4	(Spain) Javi Diestro (Argentina) Ruben Rivera	Not contested			
(Spain) Mallorca Open	20 – 26 June	(Argentina) Fernando Belasteguín (Brazil) Pablo Lima	7–6 / WO	(Argentina) Cristián Gutiérrez (Spain) Juan Martín Díaz	(Spain) Mapi Sánchez Alayeto (Spain) Majo Sánchez Alayeto	3–6 / 6–4 / 6–3	(Spain) Alejandra Salazar (Spain) Marta Marrero	€105.114
(Spain) Barcelona Challenger	27 June – 3 July	(Spain) Gonzalo Rubio (Spain) Javier Ruiz	4–6 / 6–4 / 6–3	(Spain) Alejandro Ruiz (Spain) Matias Marina	(Spain) Catalina Tenorio (Spain) Victoria Iglesias	3–6 / 6–4 / 7–6	(Spain) Gemma Triay (Spain) Lucía Sainz	
(Spain) Valladolid Open	4 – 10 July	(Argentina) Fernando Belasteguín (Brazil) Pablo Lima	7–6 / 7–5	(Spain) Paquito Navarro (Argentina) Sanyo Gutiérrez	(Spain) Mapi Sánchez Alayeto (Spain) Majo Sánchez Alayeto	6–1 / 6–1	(Spain) Gemma Triay (Spain) Lucía Sainz	€105.114
(Spain) Gran Canaria Open	25 – 31 July	(Argentina) Fernando Belasteguín (Brazil) Pablo Lima	6–0 / 6–4	(Spain) Paquito Navarro (Argentina) Sanyo Gutiérrez	Not contested			€81.364
(Spain) Mijas Challenger	8 – 14 August	(Argentina) Franco Stupaczuk (Spain) Federico Quiles	2–6 / 7–6 / 7–6	(Spain) Javier Ruiz (Spain) Pedro Alonso	Not contested			
(Spain) La Nucía Open	22 – 28 August	(Spain) Paquito Navarro (Argentina) Sanyo Gutiérrez	WO	(Argentina) Fernando Belasteguín (Brazil) Pablo Lima	(Spain) Mapi Sánchez Alayeto (Spain) Majo Sánchez Alayeto	7–6 / 6–4	(Spain) Alejandra Salazar (Spain) Marta Marrero	€105.114
(Monaco) Montecarlo Master	5 – 11 September	(Argentina) Fernando Belasteguín (Brazil) Pablo Lima	6–3 / 6–2	(Argentina) Maxi Sánchez (Spain) Matías Díaz	(Spain) Alejandra Salazar (Spain) Marta Marrero	6–0 / 6–2	(Spain) Elisabeth Amatriain (Spain) Patricia Llaguno	€123.000
(Spain) Madrid Challenger	10 – 18 September	(Spain) Godo Díaz (Argentina) Lucho Capra	6–2 / 4–6 / 6–3	(Spain) Borja Yribarren (Spain) Juan Manuel Vazquez	Not contested			
(Spain) Seville Open	19 – 25 September	(Argentina) Fernando Belasteguín (Brazil) Pablo Lima	6–4 / 6–2	(Spain) Paquito Navarro (Argentina) Sanyo Gutiérrez	(Spain) Alejandra Salazar (Spain) Marta Marrero	6–3 / 7–5	(Spain) Gemma Triay (Spain) Lucía Sainz	€105.114
(Spain) A Coruña Open	10 – 16 October	(Argentina) Fernando Belasteguín (Brazil) Pablo Lima	6–7 / 6–4 / 6–3	(Spain) Paquito Navarro (Argentina) Sanyo Gutiérrez	(Spain) Alejandra Salazar (Spain) Marta Marrero	6–4 / 6–3	(Spain) Elisabeth Amatriain (Spain) Patricia Llaguno	€81.364
(Spain) Zaragoza Open	24 – 30 October	(Argentina) Fernando Belasteguín (Brazil) Pablo Lima	6–1 / 6–2	(Spain) Matías Díaz (Argentina) Maxi Sánchez	(Spain) Alejandra Salazar (Spain) Marta Marrero	7–5 / 6–4	(Spain) Mapi Sánchez Alayeto (Spain) Majo Sánchez Alayeto	€105.114
(Argentina) Mendoza Open	31 October – 5 November	(Spain) Matías Díaz (Argentina) Maxi Sánchez	6–4 / 7–5	(Spain) Paquito Navarro (Argentina) Sanyo Gutiérrez	Not contested			€81.364
Argentina Master	7 – 13 November	(Argentina) Fernando Belasteguín (Brazil) Pablo Lima	6–3 / 6–7 / 6–3	(Spain) Paquito Navarro (Argentina) Sanyo Gutiérrez	Not contested			€95.000
(Spain) Euskadi Open	27 November – 4 December	(Argentina) Fernando Belasteguín (Brazil) Pablo Lima	6–2 / 6–4	(Spain) Paquito Navarro (Argentina) Sanyo Gutiérrez	(Spain) Alejandra Salazar (Spain) Marta Marrero	6–3 / 6–2	(Spain) Mapi Sánchez Alayeto (Spain) Majo Sánchez Alayeto	€105.114
(Spain) Master Final	14 – 18 December	(Spain) Paquito Navarro (Argentina) Sanyo Gutiérrez	6–3 / 6–4	(Spain) Juani Mieres (Argentina) Miguel Lamperti	(Spain) Mapi Sánchez Alayeto (Spain) Majo Sánchez Alayeto	6–2 / 7–6	(Spain) Alejandra Salazar (Spain) Marta Marrero	€123.000

== End of season ranking ==
Male

2016 Men's Ranking			Tournaments Won			
N.º	Name	Points	Open	Master	Master Final	Total
1	(Argentina) Fernando Belasteguín	14.640	9	3	0	12
1	(Brazil) Pablo Lima	14.640	9	3	0	12
3	(Argentina) Sanyo Gutiérrez	9.310	1	1	1	3
3	(Spain) Paquito Navarro	9.310	1	1	1	3
5	(Spain) Matías Díaz	6.475	1	0	0	1
5	(Argentina) Maxi Sánchez	6.475	1	0	0	1
7	(Spain) Juani Mieres	5.085	0	0	0	0
7	(Argentina) Miguel Lamperti	5.085	0	0	0	0
9	(Spain) Juan Martín Díaz	3.875	0	0	0	0
10	(Argentina) Adrián Allemandi	3.600	0	0	0	0
10	(Argentina) Agustín Gómez Silingo	3.600	0	0	0	0
12	(Argentina) Cristián Gutiérrez	3.245	0	0	0	0
13	(Argentina) Ramiro Moyano	2.615	0	0	0	0
13	(Argentina) Maxi Grabiel	2.615	0	0	0	0
15	(Argentina) Franco Stupaczuk	2.515	0	0	0	0

Female

2016 Women's Ranking			Tournaments Won			
N.º	Name	Points	Open	Master	Master Final	Total
1	(Spain) Alejandra Salazar	9.920	5	2	0	7
1	(Spain) Marta Marrero	9.920	5	2	0	7
3	(Spain) Mapi Sánchez Alayeto	7.230	3	0	1	4
3	(Spain) Majo Sánchez Alayeto	7.230	3	0	1	4
5	(Spain) Elisabeth Amatriain	5.700	1	0	0	1
5	(Spain) Patricia Llaguno	5.700	1	0	0	1
7	(Spain) Carolina Navarro Björk	4.050	0	0	0	0
7	(Argentina) Cecilia Reiter	4.050	0	0	0	0
9	(Spain) Gemma Triay	3.720	0	0	0	0
9	(Spain) Lucía Sainz	3.720	0	0	0	0
11	(Spain) Alba Galán	2.760	0	0	0	0
12	(Spain) Marta Ortega	2.580	0	0	0	0
13	(Spain) Catalina Tenorio	2.235	0	0	0	0
13	(Spain) Victoria Iglesias	2.235	0	0	0	0
15	(Spain) María del Carmen Villalba	1.920	0	0	0	0
