= World Padel Tour =

Men's professional padel main circuit

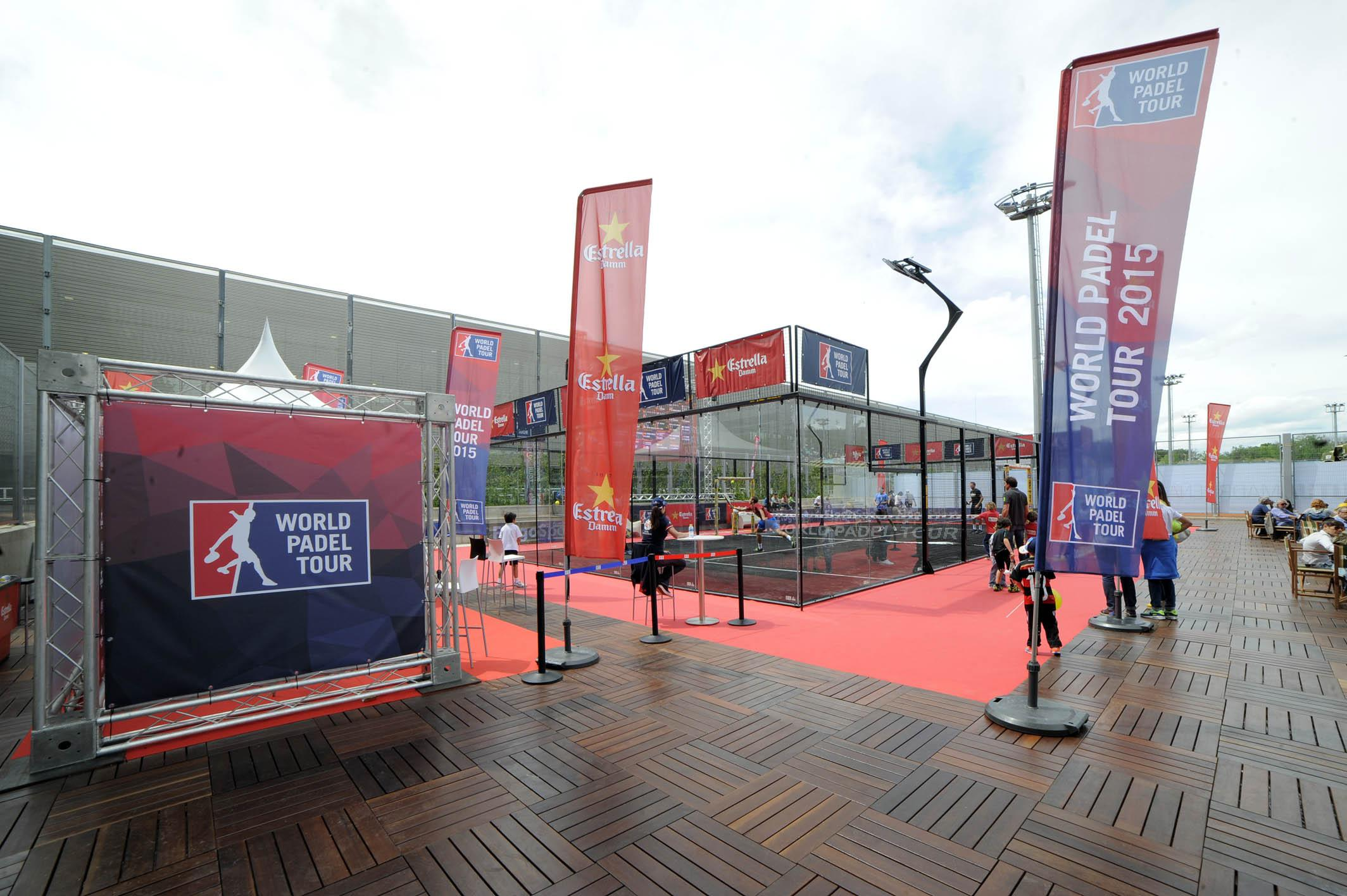
- Sport: Padel
- Abbreviation: WPT
- Founded: 2013; 13 years ago
- Affiliation: FIP
- Affiliation date: 2013
- Headquarters: Madrid, Spain
- Sponsor: Damm
- Replaced: Padel Pro Tour
- Closure date: 2023; 3 years ago

Official website
- www.worldpadeltour.com
- Previous Circuit: Padel Pro Tour; Next Circuit: Premier Padel

The World Padel Tour (WPT) was the world's premier professional padel circuit from 2013 to 2023, renowned for both the high level of tournament organization and the participation of top international players. From 2017 to 2021, it was broadcast on Gol, and from 2022 onwards, it was available on Movistar Plus+ in Spain, as well as on the World Padel Tour TV app from the round of 32 onwards in many tournaments.

The first edition was in 2013, positioning itself as the leading professional circuit, replacing the previous one, the Padel Pro Tour, as a result of an agreement between the group of organizers of Torneos Profesionales de Pádel (Professional Padel Tournaments), the Association of Professional Padel Players (AJPP) and the Spanish Women's Padel Association (AFEP).

The WPT circuit was managed by Setpoint Events S.A., a subsidiary of S.A. Damm, which establishes its regulations and guarantees and endorses the required quality standards, as well as the prizes awarded to the professional padel players participating in the circuit's tournaments. The Galis World group is the manufacturer of the official WPT padel courts in 2023.

Each year, between 15 and 25 WPT tournaments are held, plus a Master Final where the top-ranked pairs compete. Players on the circuit travel to different cities around the world to accumulate points and qualify for the Master Final, where only the top 16 players from each ranking participate after completing the regular season. Most tournaments have men's and women's competitions, although some tournaments are exclusively for men.

Some of the most important men's players on the circuit history are Fernando Belasteguín, Juan Martín Díaz, Pablo Lima, Sanyo Gutiérrez, Paquito Navarro, Juan Lebrón, Alejandro Galán, Agustín Tapia and Arturo Coello while the twins Majo and Mapi Sánchez, Marta Marrero, Alejandra Salazar, Gemma Triay, Ariana Sánchez and Paula Josemaría, represent some of the most notorious names on women's side.

The World Padel Tour experienced exponential growth in terms of international reach and television audiences. This led to the professional circuit expanding to a total of 14 countries in 2023, its most global season ever, and attracting the interest of major media corporations worldwide.

Before the 2024 season, the circuit was bought by Qatar Sports Investments (QSI) and absorbed by Premier Padel, with the latter becoming its successor as the leading international professional circuit.

== Editions ==
Ed.	Year	Men's 1st ranked pair		Women's 1st ranked pair
I	2013	(Argentina) Fernando Belasteguín	(Spain) Juan Martín Díaz	(Spain) Elisabeth Amatriain	(Spain) Patricia Llaguno
II	2014	(Argentina) Fernando Belasteguín	(Spain) Juan Martín Díaz	(Spain) Majo Sánchez	(Spain) Mapi Sánchez
III	2015	(Argentina) Fernando Belasteguín	(Brazil) Pablo Lima	(Spain) Majo Sánchez	(Spain) Mapi Sánchez
IV	2016	(Argentina) Fernando Belasteguín	(Brazil) Pablo Lima	(Spain) Alejandra Salazar	(Spain) Marta Marrero
V	2017	(Argentina) Fernando Belasteguín	(Brazil) Pablo Lima	(Spain) Majo Sánchez	(Spain) Mapi Sánchez
VI	2018	(Argentina) Maxi Sánchez	(Argentina) Sanyo Gutiérrez	(Spain) Majo Sánchez	(Spain) Mapi Sánchez
VII	2019	(Spain) Juan Lebrón	(Spain) Paquito Navarro	(Spain) Marta Marrero	(Spain) Marta Ortega
VIII	2020	(Spain) Alejandro Galán	(Spain) Juan Lebrón	(Spain) Gemma Triay	(Spain) Lucía Sainz
IX	2021	(Spain) Alejandro Galán	(Spain) Juan Lebrón	(Spain) Gemma Triay	(Spain) Alejandra Salazar
X	2022	(Spain) Alejandro Galán	(Spain) Juan Lebrón	(Spain) Gemma Triay	(Spain) Alejandra Salazar
XI	2023	(Argentina) Agustín Tapia	(Spain) Arturo Coello	(Spain) Ariana Sánchez	(Spain) Paula Josemaría

== Most times number 1 in the WPT ranking ==
These are the players who have finished the year as number 1 in the ranking.

=== Men's ===
Pos.	Player	Years	Total	Years	Runners-up
1	(Argentina) Fernando Belasteguín	2013, 2014, 2015, 2016, 2017	5	2020	1
2	(Spain) Juan Lebrón	2019, 2020, 2021, 2022	4	—	—
3	(Brazil) Pablo Lima	2015, 2016, 2017	3	2013, 2014, 2019	3
3	(Spain) Alejandro Galán	2020, 2021, 2022	3	2019	1
5	(Spain) Juan Martín Díaz	2013, 2014	2	—	—
6	(Spain) Paquito Navarro	2019	1	2015, 2016, 2017, 2021	4
6	(Argentina) Sanyo Gutiérrez	2018	1	2016, 2017, 2022	3
6	(Argentina) Agustín Tapia	2023	1	2019, 2022	1
6	(Argentina) Maxi Sánchez	2018	1	—	—
6	(Spain) Arturo Coello	2023	1	—	—

=== Women's ===
Pos.	Player	Years	Total	Years	Runners-up
1	(Spain) Majo Sánchez	2014, 2015, 2017, 2018	4	2016	1
1	(Spain) Mapi Sánchez	2014, 2015, 2017, 2018	4	2016	1
3	(Spain) Alejandra Salazar	2016, 2021, 2022	3	2014, 2015, 2018, 2019, 2020	5
3	(Spain) Gemma Triay	2020, 2021, 2022	3	2023	1
5	(Spain) Marta Marrero	2016, 2019	2	2015, 2017, 2018	3
6	(Spain) Ariana Sánchez	2023	1	2019, 2020, 2021, 2022	4
6	(Spain) Paula Josemaría	2023	1	2021, 2022	2
6	(Spain) Lucía Sainz	2020	1	—	—
6	(Spain) Marta Ortega	2019	1	—	—
6	(Spain) Elisabeth Amatriain	2013	1	—	—
6	(Spain) Patricia Llaguno	2013	1	—	—

== Most WPT tournaments won ==
These are all the players who have won a WPT title. Only Open (1000), Master, and Master Final tournaments are included.

Male

Pos.	Player	Wins	Last tournament won
1st	(Argentina) Fernando Belasteguín	65	02/10/2022
2nd	(Brazil) Pablo Lima	50	19/06/2022
3rd	(Argentina) Sanyo Gutiérrez	37	24/07/2022
4th	(Spain) Alejandro Galán	34	12/11/2023
5th	(Spain) Juan Lebrón	32	12/11/2023
6th	(Spain) Paquito Navarro	25	17/12/2023
7th	(Argentina) Agustín Tapia	22	26/11/2023
7th	(Argentina) Maxi Sánchez	22	27/06/2021
9th	(Spain) Juan Martín Díaz	20	20/12/2015
10th	(Spain) Arturo Coello	14	26/11/2023
10th	(Argentina) Franco Stupaczuk	14	15/10/2023
12th	(Argentina) Martín Di Nenno	11	15/10/2023
13th	(Spain) Matías Díaz	8	17/11/2019
13th	(Spain) Juani Mieres	8	09/06/2019
15th	(Argentina) Cristian Gutiérrez	5	14/10/2018
16th	(Argentina) Federico Chingotto	2	17/12/2023
16th	(Argentina) Juan Tello	2	27/11/2022
16th	(Spain) Alejandro Ruiz	2	06/12/2021
16th	(Spain) Willy Lahoz	2	26/04/2015
16th	(Argentina) Maxi Grabiel	2	23/11/2014
21st	(Argentina) Lucho Capra	1	27/06/2021

Female

Pos.	Player	Wins	Last tournament won
1st	(Spain) Alejandra Salazar	52	26/03/2023
2nd	(Spain) Gemma Triay	36	29/10/2023
3rd	(Spain) Ariana Sánchez	34	15/10/2023
4th	(Spain) Mapi Sánchez Alayeto	32	09/08/2020
4th	(Spain) Majo Sánchez Alayeto	32	09/08/2020
6th	(Spain) Paula Josemaría	28	15/10/2023
7th	(Spain) Marta Marrero	25	08/03/2020
8th	(Spain) Marta Ortega	12	29/10/2023
8th	(Spain) Lucía Sainz	12	13/12/2020
10th	(Spain) Bea González	9	17/12/2023
11th	(Argentina) Delfina Brea	8	17/12/2023
12th	(Spain) Patricia Llaguno	5	09/05/2021
12th	(Spain) Icíar Montes	5	21/09/2014
14th	(Spain) Elisabeth Amatriaín	4	08/05/2016
15th	(Argentina) Cecilia Reiter	3	29/09/2013
15th	(Spain) Carolina Navarro	3	29/09/2013
17th	(Spain) Tamara Icardo	2	11/07/2021
18th	(Argentina) Virginia Riera	1	09/05/2021
18th	(Portugal) Ana Catarina Nogueira	1	08/09/2019
18th	(Argentina) Catalina Tenorio	1	09/11/2014

== See also ==
- Padel Pro Tour
- Premier Padel
- International Padel Federation
- List of FIP number 1 ranked padel players
