= Alejandra Salazar =

Spanish padel player (born 1985)

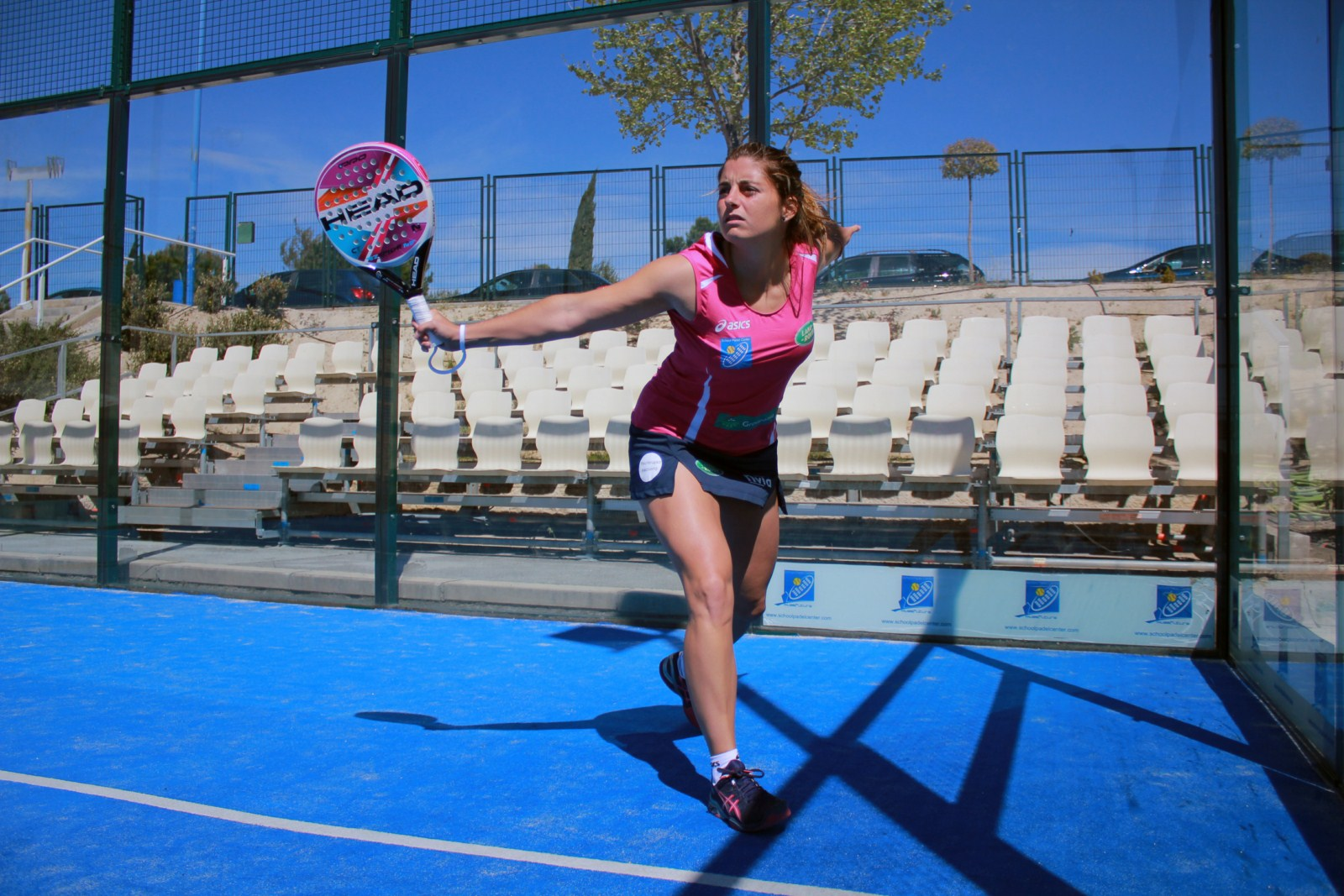
- Salazar in 2012

Personal information
- Full name: Alejandra Salazar Bengoechea
- Born: 31 December 1985 (age 40) Madrid, Spain
- Height: 1.68 m (5 ft 6 in)

Sport
- Country: Spain
- Sport: Padel
- Position: Right side (drive)
- Partner: Aranzazu Osoro
- Coached by: Manu Martín, Pablo Semprún
- Updated on 21 August 2026

Alejandra Salazar Bengoechea (born 31 December 1985) is a Spanish professional padel player from Madrid. She finished four seasons as the world number one, in 2009 on the Padel Pro Tour with Carolina Navarro and on the World Padel Tour in 2016 with Marta Marrero and in 2021 and 2022 with Gemma Triay, and holds the record for the most World Padel Tour titles, with 52. With the Spanish national team she has won seven world team titles, one more than Fernando Belasteguín, the previous record holder. In 2025 she announced that she would retire at the end of the 2026 season.

== Early career ==
Salazar won a world pairs title with Patty Llaguno when she was fifteen, and took her first senior Spanish title at eighteen, in 2004 in Pamplona, partnering Carolina Navarro. She won the national championship again with Navarro in 2009 and 2012, and with Icíar Montes in 2013 and 2014. The 2009 season with Navarro also ended with the pair on top of the Padel Pro Tour ranking, making Salazar, then 24, the world number one for the first time.

In 2013 Salazar suffered a viral myocarditis during a week off after a tournament. A first hospital visit found nothing and she was told she was having an anxiety attack; the following night she returned with strong palpitations and was diagnosed with an inflammation of the myocardium. She recovered without lasting damage to her heart, but said that "by minutes" she might not have lived to tell it.

== Marta Marrero (2015–2018) ==
Salazar began playing with Marta Marrero in 2015, and the pair won the Spanish championship that year. In 2016 they won seven World Padel Tour tournaments, finished the season as the number one pair and took both the pairs and team titles at the World Championship. They reached the top of the ranking in Seville in late September 2016, ending the long run of the Sánchez Alayeto twins, in a season in which Salazar also missed time with a pneumothorax in May. In June 2017, during the final of the Valladolid Open, Salazar tore the anterior cruciate ligament in her knee and was ruled out for the rest of the season. She had surgery in Madrid in August to reconstruct the ligament in her left knee and was sidelined for about six months. Back on court in 2018, she was in the Spanish squad that retained the world team title in Paraguay in November, playing the opening match of the final against Argentina alongside Patty Llaguno. In December the pair won the Master Final at the Madrid Arena, beating the Sánchez Alayeto twins 6–3, 6–2, a title with special meaning for Salazar months after the death of her father.

== Ariana Sánchez (2019–2020) ==
Salazar partnered Ariana Sánchez in 2019 and 2020. In November 2020 the pair won the Spanish Championship in Madrid, Salazar's eighth national title.

== Gemma Triay (2021–2023) ==
In 2021 Salazar joined Gemma Triay. The pair finished both 2021 and 2022 as the world number ones, and their twelve titles in 2022 set a record for a women's pair in a single season. In March 2023 Salazar won her fiftieth World Padel Tour title, at the La Rioja Open in Argentina. Her season was then interrupted by an operation on her right elbow that kept her off court for months, and when she returned Triay had decided to continue with another partner.

== Later career (2023–2026) ==
Salazar returned to competition at the end of August 2023 at the Finland Open, with the Portuguese Sofia Araújo as her new partner. Injuries to her partners marked her 2024 season: she began the year with Tamara Icardo, whose recovery from injury dragged on, and went through four or five partners before settling with Jessica Castelló in the autumn. In November 2024 she was picked for the World Championship in Doha, where Spain beat Argentina in the final and Salazar won her seventh world team title, moving her past Fernando Belasteguín's six as the most decorated player in the history of the championship.

Salazar played 2025 first with Verónica Virseda and then with the 17-year-old Martina Calvo. In July 2025 she announced that 2026 would be her last season as a professional, saying that operations on both knees and on her elbow had made the previous years physically difficult, and that after retiring she wanted to work with GOAT Sports Management, a padel player agency she had co-founded. After playing the first half of 2026 with Alejandra Alonso, she partnered the Argentine Aranzazu Osoro from the Málaga P1 in July. She went into the last tournaments of her career coached by Manu Martín and Pablo Semprún and ranked 13th in the FIP ranking of August 2026.

== Honours ==
- World Championship (team): a record seven titles with the Spanish national team (2010, 2014, 2016, 2018, 2021, 2022, 2024).
- World Padel Tour Master Final: a record five titles.
- World Championship (pairs): 2016 (with Marta Marrero).
- Year-end world number one: 2009 (Padel Pro Tour, with Carolina Navarro); 2016, 2021 and 2022 (World Padel Tour, with Marta Marrero and Gemma Triay).
