= 2019 WPT Master Final =

World Padel Tour tournament held in Barcelona, Spain

- Date: 12 – 15 December
- Edition: 14th (Note: The first seven editions we're held under the organization of the Padel Pro Tour.)
- Category: Master Final
- Location: Barcelona, Spain
- Venue: Palau Sant Jordi

Champions
- Men's doubles: (Spain) Alejandro Galán (Brazil) Pablo Lima
- Women's doubles: (Spain) Alejandra Salazar (Spain) Ariana Sánchez

Chronology
Previous
Mexico Open
Next
Marbella Master
(2020)

The 2019 Master Final (officially 2019 World Padel Tour Estrella Damm Master Final) was the eighteenth tournament of the seventh season organized by World Padel Tour, the most prestigious padel circuit at the time.

In the women's category, for the seventh time this season, the two best ranked pairs reached the finals, with both defending champions reaching the final but now as rivals. In the decisive match, Alejandra Salazar and Ariana Sánchez defeated Marta Marrero and Marta Ortega, who despite finishing the season as number 1s, would separate, with this being their last tournament together. With the victory, Ariana and Salazar won their fifth title of the season and their first Master Finals as a pair (Salazar's fifth victory, as she had also won in 2009, 2013, 2015 and 2018).

In the men's tournament, both defending champions also reached the final, but as in the women's tournament, they were also opponents. The first finalists were Agustín Tapia and Fernando Belasteguín, who reached the final after defeating the world's number 1 pair, Juan Lebrón and Paquito Navarro, in the semifinals. Their opponents were Alejandro Galán and Pablo Lima, who reached the final after defeating the world's number 2 ranked pair, Maxi Sánchez and Sanyo Gutiérrez, in the semifinals. In the decisive match, Galán and Lima defeated Belasteguín and Tapia in two sets, with Lima successfully defending the title and securing their fourth title together this season (the fifth for Galán). This victory marked Lima's third Master Final title (having won in 2012, 2017 and 2018), while Galán won the competition for the first time.

== Relevant Data ==
=== Historic day at Palau Sant Jordi with record attendance ===
The semi-final round of the Estrella Damm Master Final set a world attendance record (at the time), with Palau Sant Jordi hosting no fewer than 9,558 spectators. This number surpasses the previous record, set at the 2018 edition of the Master Final, which had 7,279 fans in attendance.

=== The final dance for several pairs ===
As is common in the world of Padel, the Master Finals would be the last tournament for several pairs on the circuit, who would begin the following season with new partners.

The first change would be the separation of the world's number 1 pair, Juan Lebrón and Paquito Navarro. Despite Lebrón and Paquito having won five titles together (in Alicante, Jaén, Valladolid, Sweden and São Paulo) and five more finals, and becoming the first Spanish pair to reach the pinnacle of professional padel, the Spaniards would choose to end their partnership. Their paths would be linked with another pair that also separated, Alejandro Galán and Pablo Lima, who were the most competitive pair during the second half of the season, and after joining forces in June, in just six months, won four titles (Valencia, Mijas, Portugal and the Master Final). Paquito would return to playing with Lima, with whom he had already played some tournaments in 2018, while Lebrón would join Galán, with whom he had already won the World Pairs Championship in 2018.

Another pair that would also separate was the number 2 ranked pair, Maxi Sánchez and Sanyo Gutiérrez, who had managed to stay at the top of the rankings until November, even facing the best version of a Paquito and Lebrón in great form. During their time together, they played in 32 tournaments, won 13 titles and dominated the world of padel for more than a year. Their partners would be the members of the 5th-ranked pair, who would also split up, Franco Stuaczuk and Matías Díaz, with Stuaczuk joining Sanyo and Matías joining Maxi, with whom he had already played in 2017.

A similar situation would happen on the women's side, with Marta Ortega and Marta Marrero ending their partnership for the 2020 season, just 365 days after officially announcing their union. The 'Martas' had won seven titles (Córdoba, Portugal, Valencia, Sweden, Vigo, Logroño and Marbella) in addition to three other finals, dominating the women's padel circuit with an iron fist throughout 2019. Marrero would join one of Spain's rising young talents, Paula Josemaría, while Ortega would choose the young prodigy Bea González, just 19 years old, as her new partner.

== Head-to-head record between teams ranked in the top 4 during the season ==
=== Men's ===
Record	Lebrón–Paquito	Maxi–Sanyo	Galán–Lima	Belasteguín–Tapia	Former Pairs	Díaz–Stupaczuk	Belasteguín–Lima	Galán–J. Mieres	Lamperti–Mieres
Lebrón–Paquito	—	1–4	0–2	2–3		2–3	5–0	2–0	—
Maxi–Sanyo	4–1	—	1–1	1–1		4–0	—	1–1	—
Galán–Lima	2–0	1–1	—	2–0		2–1	—	—	—
Belasteguín–Tapia	3–2	1–1	0–2	—		1–0	—	—	—
Former Pairs
Díaz–Stupaczuk	3–2	0–4	1–2	0–1		—	0–1	2–0	—
Belasteguín–Lima	0–5	—	—	—		1–0	—	0–1	—
Galán–J. Mieres	0–2	1–1	—	—		0–2	1–0	—	—
Lamperti–Mieres	—	—	—	—		—	—	—	—

=== Women's ===
Record	Marrero–Ortega	Ariana–Salazar	Josemaria–Nogueira	Triay–Sainz	Former Pairs	Amatriain–Llaguno	Majo–Mapi	Delfina–Majo
Marrero–Ortega	—	4–3	5–1	4–0		5–2	1–1	2–0
Ariana–Salazar	3–4	—	3–2	4–0		4–1	1–1	4–0
Josemaria–Nogueira	1–5	2–3	—	3–1		1–2	—	1–0
Triay–Sainz	0–4	0–4	1–3	—		0–1	1–0	—
Former Pairs
Amatriain–Llaguno	2–5	1–4	2–1	1–0		—	2–1	2–3
Majo–Mapi	1–1	1–1	—	0–1		1–2	—	—
Delfina–Majo	0–2	0–4	0–1	—		3–2	—	—

== Draws ==
=== Men's Bracket ===
Quarter-Final
1	(Spain) Lebrón / (Spain) Paquito	3	6	6
6	(Spain) J. Ruiz / (Spain) U. Botello	6	4	4
8	(Argentina) A. Silingo / (Spain) J. Mieres	6	6
4	(Argentina) Belasteguín / (Argentina) Tapia	1	3
3	(Spain) Galán / (Brazil) Lima	6	6
5	(Argentina) F. Stupaczuk / (Spain) M. Díaz	1	2
7	(Argentina) F. Chingotto / (Argentina) J. Tello	6	4
2	(Argentina) Maxi / (Argentina) Sanyo	7	6

Semi-Finals
1	(Spain) Lebrón / (Spain) Paquito	3	5
4	(Argentina) Belasteguín / (Argentina) Tapia	6	7
3	(Spain) Galán / (Brazil) Lima	6	4	6
2	(Argentina) Maxi / (Argentina) Sanyo	4	6	1

Finals
4	(Argentina) Belasteguín / (Argentina) Tapia	6	3
3	(Spain) Galán / (Brazil) Lima	7	6

=== Women's Bracket ===
Quarter-Final
1	(Spain) M. Marrero / (Spain) M. Ortega	6	6
6	(Spain) Majo / (Spain) Mapi	2	4
8	(Spain) C. Navarro / (Argentina) C. Reiter	6	7
4	(Spain) Gemma / (Spain) L. Sainz	3	6
3	(Portugal) A.C. Nogueira / (Spain) P. Josemaría	5	6	4
7	(Spain) B. González / (Argentina) D. Brea	7	4	6
5	(Spain) E. Amatriain / (Spain) P. Llaguno	2	2
2	(Spain) Ariana / (Spain) Salazar	6	6

Semi-Finals
1	(Spain) M. Marrero / (Spain) M. Ortega	6	6
8	(Spain) C. Navarro / (Argentina) C. Reiter	3	1
7	(Spain) B. González / (Argentina) D. Brea	6	3	6
2	(Spain) Ariana / (Spain) Salazar	3	6	7

Finals
1	(Spain) M. Marrero / (Spain) M. Ortega	5	6	6
2	(Spain) Ariana / (Spain) Salazar	7	3	7

== Results ==
=== Quarter-Finals ===
Men's
Date	Winners	Score	Opponent	Ref.
19/12/2019	(Spain) Juan Lebrón (Spain) Paquito Navarro	3–6 / 6–4 / 6–4	(Spain) Javi Ruiz (Spain) Uri Botello	
19/12/2019	(Argentina) Agustín Tapia (Argentina) Fernando Belasteguín	6–1 / 6–3	(Argentina) Agustin Gomez Silingo (Spain) Juani Mieres	
20/12/2019	(Spain) Alejandro Galán (Brazil) Pablo Lima	6–1 / 6–2	(Argentina) Franco Stupaczuk (Spain) Matías Díaz	
20/12/2019	(Argentina) Maxi Sánchez (Argentina) Sanyo Gutiérrez	7–6 / 6–4	(Argentina) Federico Chingotto (Argentina) Juan Tello	

Women's
Date	Winners	Score	Opponent	Ref.
19/12/2019	(Spain) Marta Marrero (Spain) Marta Ortega	6–2 / 6–4	(Spain) Majo Sánchez (Spain) Mapi Sánchez	
19/12/2019	(Spain) Carolina Navarro (Argentina) Cecilia Reiter	6–3 / 7–6	(Spain) Gemma Triay (Spain) Lucia Sainz	
20/12/2019	(Spain) Bea González (Argentina) Delfina Brea	7–5 / 4–6 / 6–4	(Portugal) Ana Catarina Nogueira (Spain) Paula Josemaría	
20/12/2019	(Spain) Alejandra Salazar (Spain) Ariana Sánchez	6–2 / 6–2	(Spain) Elisabeth Amatriain (Spain) Patricia Llaguno	

=== Semi-Finals ===
Men's
Date	Winners	Score	Opponent	Ref.
21/12/2019	(Argentina) Agustín Tapia (Argentina) Fernando Belasteguín	6–3 / 7–5	(Spain) Juan Lebrón (Spain) Paquito Navarro	
21/12/2019	(Spain) Alejandro Galán (Brazil) Pablo Lima	6–4 / 4–6 / 6–1	(Argentina) Maxi Sánchez (Argentina) Sanyo Gutiérrez	

Women's
Date	Winners	Score	Opponent	Ref.
21/12/2019	(Spain) Marta Marrero (Spain) Marta Ortega	6–3 / 6–1	(Spain) Carolina Navarro (Argentina) Cecilia Reiter	
21/12/2019	(Spain) Alejandra Salazar (Spain) Ariana Sánchez	3–6 / 6–3 / 7–6	(Spain) Bea González (Argentina) Delfina Brea	

=== Finals ===
Men's
Date	Winners	Score	Opponent	Ref.
22/12/2019	(Spain) Alejandro Galán (Brazil) Pablo Lima	7–6 / 6–3	(Argentina) Agustín Tapia (Argentina) Fernando Belasteguín	

Women's
Date	Winners	Score	Opponent	Ref.
22/12/2019	(Spain) Alejandra Salazar (Spain) Ariana Sánchez	7–5 / 3–6 / 7–6	(Spain) Marta Marrero (Spain) Marta Ortega	
