= 2021 WPT Valladolid Master =

World Padel Tour tournament held in Valladolid, Spain

- Date: 21 – 27 June
- Edition: 13th (Note: The first seven editions were held under the organization of the Padel Pro Tour, with this being the first as a Master event.)
- Category: Master
- Location: Valladolid, Spain
- Venue: Plaza Mayor

Champions
- Men's doubles: (Argentina) Lucho Capra (Argentina) Maxi Sánchez
- Women's doubles: (Spain) Alejandra Salazar (Spain) Gemma Triay

Chronology

The 2021 Valladolid Master (officially 2021 World Padel Tour Valladolid Master) was the sixth tournament of the ninth season organized by World Padel Tour, the most prestigious padel circuit at the time.

In the women's category, the top two ranked pairs both reached the final for the second time this season. The first finalists were the world number ones, Alejandra Salazar and Gemma Triay, who eliminated the third-ranked pair, Bea González and Lucia Sainz, in the semi-final. Their opponents were the second-ranked pair, Ariana Sánchez and Paula Josemaria, who eliminated the fourth-ranked pair, Marta Marrero and Marta Ortega, to reach the final. In the championship match, Gemma and Salazar defeated Ariana and Paula in two sets, winning their second title of the season. With this victory, Salazar won her third title in Valladolid (having already won in 2009 and 2019) and Gemma her second (having won in 2018).

In the men's category, for the first time this season neither of the two seeded pairs reached the final. The first finalists were Federico Chingotto and Juan Tello, who eliminated the world number ones, Alejandro Galán and Juan Lebrón, to reach the final. Their opponents were Lucho Capra and Maxi Sánchez, who advanced to the final after defeating the second-ranked pair, Fernando Belasteguín and Sanyo Gutiérrez, in the semi-final. In the final, Capra and Maxi defeated Chingotto and Tello in two sets to win their first title as a pair and Capra's first career title (while for Maxi it would be his first in Valladolid).

== Head-to-head record between teams ranked in the top 4 during the season ==
=== Men's ===
Record	Galán–Lebrón	Belasteguín–Sanyo	Lima–Tapia	Chingotto–Tello	Former Pairs	Di Nenno–Paquito
Galán–Lebrón	—	—	1–0	1–1		2–1
Belasteguín–Sanyo	—	—	1–0	—		1–0
Lima–Tapia	0–1	0–1	—	1–0		—
Chingotto–Tello	1–1	—	0–1	—		2–0
Former Pairs
Di Nenno–Paquito	1–2	0–1	—	0–2		—

=== Women's ===
Record	Gemma–Salazar	Ariana–Josemaria	Marrero–Ortega	Bea–Lucia
Gemma–Salazar	—	2–1	—	1–1
Ariana–Josemaria	1–2	—	1–0	2–0
Marrero–Ortega	—	0–1	—	—
Bea–Lucia	1–1	0–2	—	—

== Draws ==
=== Men's Bracket ===
Round of 32
1	(Spain) Galán / (Spain) Lebrón	6	6
Q	(Spain) E. Alonso / (Spain) J. Moya	2	3
(Spain) Coello / (Argentina) M. Lamperti	6	4	6
(Spain) C. Fuster / (Spain) J. Sanz	2	6	3
(Spain) Á. Cepero / (Brazil) L. Campagnolo	6	7	6
(Spain) J. Rico / (Argentina) R. Moyano	7	6	3
(Spain) J.M. Díaz / (Spain) P. Lijó	7	3	6
6	(Spain) A. Ruiz / (Argentina) Stupaczuk	5	6	2
5	(Argentina) Di Nenno / (Spain) Paquito	6	6
(Spain) J.G. Diestro / (Spain) P. Fernández	2	3
(Spain) F. Gil Morales / (Spain) S. Alba	6	4
(Spain) J. Rico / (Spain) Momo	7	6
(Spain) A. Blanco / (Spain) J. Barahona	6	6
(Argentina) A. Allemandi / (Spain) Coki	3	4
(Argentina) D. Perino / (Spain) E. Moreno	4	6	3
4	(Argentina) Chingotto / (Argentina) J. Tello	6	4	6
3	(Brazil) Lima / (Argentina) Tapia	6	6
Q	(Argentina) M. Grabiel / (Argentina) S. Nerone	2	4
(Argentina) L. Capra / (Argentina) Maxi	4	7	7
(Spain) G. Rubio / (Spain) R. Méndez	6	6	6
(Spain) I. Ramírez / (Spain) M. Yanguas	4	7	6
(Argentina) A. Gutiérrez / (Spain) J. Martinez	6	5	4
(Spain) J. Garrido / (Argentina) J.C. Belluati	7	6
8	(Argentina) A. Silingo / (Spain) M. Díaz	6	4
7	(Spain) J. Ruiz / (Spain) U. Botello	4	6
(Spain) A. Sans / (Spain) I. Zaratiegui	6	7
(Spain) J. Mieres / (Spain) M. Piñeiro
(Uruguay) D. Ramos / (Spain) J. Gutiérrez	6	5
(Spain) N. Gadea / (Spain) V. Ruiz	6	4	5
Q	(Spain) A. Arroyo / (Spain) S. Oria	4	6	7
Q	(Spain) A. Luque / (Spain) M. Del Castillo	3	2
2	(Argentina) Belasteguín / (Argentina) Sanyo	6	6

Round of 16
1	(Spain) Galán / (Spain) Lebrón	6	6
(Spain) Coello / (Argentina) M. Lamperti	2	3
(Spain) Á. Cepero / (Brazil) L. Campagnolo	5	4
(Spain) J.M. Díaz / (Spain) P. Lijó	7	6
5	(Argentina) Di Nenno / (Spain) Paquito	7	6
(Spain) J. Rico / (Spain) Momo	5	2
(Spain) A. Blanco / (Spain) J. Barahona	6	3
4	(Argentina) Chingotto / (Argentina) J. Tello	7	6
3	(Brazil) Lima / (Argentina) Tapia	6	6	6
(Argentina) L. Capra / (Argentina) Maxi	3	7	7
(Spain) I. Ramírez / (Spain) M. Yanguas	6	6
(Spain) J. Garrido / (Argentina) J.C. Belluati	2	2
(Spain) A. Sans / (Spain) I. Zaratiegui	4	4
(Spain) J. Mieres / (Spain) M. Piñeiro	6	6
Q	(Spain) A. Arroyo / (Spain) S. Oria	6	4	6
2	(Argentina) Belasteguín / (Argentina) Sanyo	3	6	7

Quarter-Final
1	(Spain) Galán / (Spain) Lebrón	7	6
(Spain) J.M. Díaz / (Spain) P. Lijó	6	2
5	(Argentina) Di Nenno / (Spain) Paquito	6	3
4	(Argentina) Chingotto / (Argentina) J. Tello	7	6
(Argentina) L. Capra / (Argentina) Maxi	6	6
(Spain) I. Ramírez / (Spain) M. Yanguas	2	3
(Spain) J. Mieres / (Spain) M. Piñeiro	5	6	3
2	(Argentina) Belasteguín / (Argentina) Sanyo	7	4	6

Semi-Finals
1	(Spain) Galán / (Spain) Lebrón	4	6
4	(Argentina) Chingotto / (Argentina) J. Tello	6	7
(Argentina) L. Capra / (Argentina) Maxi	6	3	6
2	(Argentina) Belasteguín / (Argentina) Sanyo	4	6	3

Finals
4	(Argentina) Chingotto / (Argentina) J. Tello	3	4
(Argentina) L. Capra / (Argentina) Maxi	6	6

=== Women's Bracket ===
Round of 32
1	(Spain) Gemma / (Spain) Salazar	6	6
(Spain) L. Martínez / (Spain) V. Virseda	3	2
(Spain) A. Cortiles / (Uruguay) A. De los Santos	3	2
(Spain) B. Caldera / (Spain) C. Goenaga	6	6
(Argentina) C. Jensen / (Spain) S. Bellver	7	6
(Spain) A. Blanco / (Spain) S. Hernández	6	2
(Spain) E. Amatriain / (Portugal) S. Araújo	2	4
8	(Argentina) A. Osoro / (Spain) V. Iglesias	6	6
5	(Spain) P. Llaguno / (Argentina) V. Riera	6	6
Q	(Spain) J. Velasco / (Spain) N. Canovas	0	0
(France) A. Collombon / (Spain) J. Castelló	6	6
(Spain) A. Cañellas / (France) L. Godallier	2	3
(Spain) A.F. Ossó / (Argentina) N. Brito	2	5
(Spain) E. Carnicero / (Brazil) R. Piltcher	6	7
(Spain) C. Navarro / (Argentina) C. Reiter	4	4
3	(Spain) Bea González / (Spain) L. Sainz	6	6
4	(Spain) M. Marrero / (Spain) M. Ortega	6	6
(Argentina) C. Paz / (Spain) P. Martinez	0	3
(Argentina) C. Tenorio / (Argentina) J. Bidahorria	6	6
(Spain) I. Domínguez / (Spain) L. Alonso	4	4
(Spain) A. Galán / (Spain) M. Villalba	6	3	6
Q	(Spain) M. Lobo / (Spain) S. Saiz	2	6	1
(Spain) B. Las Heras / (Spain) C. Mesa	6	6	6
6	(Spain) Majo / (Spain) Mapi	3	7	3
7	(Argentina) D. Brea / (Spain) T. Icardo	6	6
(Spain) N. Traviesa / (Spain) N. Rodriguez	0	2
(Spain) A. Cantin / (Spain) A. Soriano	4	7	6
Q	(Spain) M. Pinacho / (Spain) M. Guinart	6	5	1
Q	(Venezuela) A. Seijas / (Spain) Gala León	4	2
(Spain) L. Rufo / (Spain) M. Talavan	6	6
(Portugal) A.C. Nogueira / (Spain) T. Navarro	4	1
2	(Spain) Ariana / (Spain) P. Josemaria	6	6

Round of 16
1	(Spain) Gemma / (Spain) Salazar	6	6
(Spain) B. Caldera / (Spain) C. Goenaga	1	1
(Argentina) C. Jensen / (Spain) S. Bellver	2	2
8	(Argentina) A. Osoro / (Spain) V. Iglesias	6	6
5	(Spain) P. Llaguno / (Argentina) V. Riera	6	6
(France) A. Collombon / (Spain) J. Castelló	1	2
(Spain) E. Carnicero / (Brazil) R. Piltcher	2	3
3	(Spain) Bea González / (Spain) L. Sainz	6	6
4	(Spain) M. Marrero / (Spain) M. Ortega	6	7
(Argentina) C. Tenorio / (Argentina) J. Bidahorria	0	5
(Spain) A. Galán / (Spain) M. Villalba	6	6
(Spain) B. Las Heras / (Spain) C. Mesa	2	3
7	(Argentina) D. Brea / (Spain) T. Icardo	6	6
(Spain) A. Cantin / (Spain) A. Soriano	0	0
(Spain) L. Rufo / (Spain) M. Talavan	4	2
2	(Spain) Ariana / (Spain) P. Josemaria	6	6

Quarter-Final
1	(Spain) Gemma / (Spain) Salazar	7	6	6
8	(Argentina) A. Osoro / (Spain) V. Iglesias	6	7	3
5	(Spain) P. Llaguno / (Argentina) V. Riera	2	3
3	(Spain) Bea González / (Spain) L. Sainz	6	6
4	(Spain) M. Marrero / (Spain) M. Ortega	*
(Spain) A. Galán / (Spain) M. Villalba
7	(Argentina) D. Brea / (Spain) T. Icardo	1	4
2	(Spain) Ariana / (Spain) P. Josemaria	6	6

Semi-Finals
1	(Spain) Gemma / (Spain) Salazar	6	7
3	(Spain) Bea González / (Spain) L. Sainz	1	6
4	(Spain) M. Marrero / (Spain) M. Ortega	1	6	6
2	(Spain) Ariana / (Spain) P. Josemaria	6	3	7

Finals
1	(Spain) Gemma / (Spain) Salazar	6	6
2	(Spain) Ariana / (Spain) P. Josemaria	3	3

== Results ==
=== Round of 32 ===
Men's
Date	Winners	Score	Opponent	Ref.
23/6/2021	(Spain) Alejandro Galán (Spain) Juan Lebrón	6–2 / 6–3	(Spain) Eduardo Alonso (Spain) Jesús Moya	
23/6/2021	(Spain) Arturo Coello (Argentina) Miguel Lamperti	6–2 / 4–6 / 6–3	(Spain) Christian Fuster (Spain) Jon Sanz	
23/6/2021	(Spain) Álvaro Cepero (Brazil) Lucas Campagnolo	6–7 / 7–6 / 6–3	(Spain) José Rico (Argentina) Ramiro Moyano	
23/6/2021	(Spain) Juan Martín Díaz (Spain) Pablo Lijó	7–5 / 3–6 / 6–2	(Spain) Alejandro Ruiz (Argentina) Franco Stupaczuk	
23/6/2021	(Argentina) Martin Di Nenno (Spain) Paquito Navarro	6–2 / 6–3	(Spain) José García Diestro (Spain) Pincho Fernández	
23/6/2021	(Spain) Javier Rico (Spain) Momo González	7–6 / 6–4	(Spain) Francisco Gil Morales (Spain) Sergio Alba	
23/6/2021	(Spain) Adrian Blanco (Spain) Javier Barahona	6–3 / 6–4	(Argentina) Adrián Allemandi (Spain) Coki Nieto	
23/6/2021	(Argentina) Federico Chingotto (Argentina) Juan Tello	6–4 / 4–6 / 6–3	(Argentina) Denis Perino (Spain) Ernesto Moreno	
23/6/2021	(Argentina) Agustín Tapia (Brazil) Pablo Lima	6–2 / 6–4	(Argentina) Maxi Grabiel (Argentina) Sebastián Nerone	
23/6/2021	(Argentina) Lucho Capra (Argentina) Maxi Sánchez	4–6 / 7–6 / 7–6	(Spain) Gonzalo Rubio (Spain) Rafael Méndez	
23/6/2021	(Spain) Iván Ramírez (Spain) Mike Yanguas	4–6 / 7–5 / 6–4	(Argentina) Agustín Gutiérrez (Spain) Javier Martinez Vázquez	
23/6/2021	(Spain) Javi Garrido (Argentina) Juan Cruz Belluati	7–6 / 6–4	(Argentina) Agustin Gomez Silingo (Spain) Matías Díaz	
23/6/2021	(Spain) Anton Sans (Spain) Iñigo Zaratiegui	6–4 / 7–6	(Spain) Javier Ruiz (Spain) Uri Botello	
23/6/2021	(Spain) Juani Mieres (Spain) Martín Sánchez Piñeiro	7–6 / 7–5	(Uruguay) Diego Ramos (Spain) Jorge Ruiz Gutiérrez	
23/6/2021	(Spain) Alejandro Arroyo (Spain) Salvador Oria	4–6 / 6–4 / 7–5	(Spain) Nacho Gadea (Spain) Víctor Ruiz	
23/6/2021	(Argentina) Fernando Belasteguín (Argentina) Sanyo Gutiérrez	6–3 / 6–2	(Spain) Antonio Luque (Spain) Mario Del Castillo	

Women's
Date	Winners	Score	Opponent	Ref.
23/6/2021	(Spain) Alejandra Salazar (Spain) Gemma Triay	6–3 / 6–2	(Spain) Lucía Martínez (Spain) Verónica Virseda	
23/6/2021	(Spain) Beatriz Caldera (Spain) Carmen Goenaga	6–3 / 6–2	(Uruguay) Andreina de los Santos (Spain) Anna Cortiles	
23/6/2021	(Argentina) Claudia Jensen (Spain) Sandra Bellver	7–6 / 6–2	(Spain) Alicia Blanco Rojo (Spain) Sandra Hernández	
23/6/2021	(Argentina) Aranzazu Osoro (Spain) Victoria Iglesias	6–2 / 6–4	(Spain) Elisabeth Amatriain (Portugal) Sofia Araújo	
23/6/2021	(Spain) Patricia Llaguno (Argentina) Virginia Riera	6–0 / 6–0	(Spain) Jimena Velasco (Spain) Noa Canovas	
23/6/2021	(France) Alix Collombon (Spain) Jessica Castelló	6–2 / 6–3	(Spain) Ariadna Cañellas (France) Lea Godallier	
23/6/2021	(Spain) Esther Carnicero (Brazil) Raquel Piltcher	6–2 / 7–5	(Spain) Ana Fernández de Ossó (Argentina) Nela Brito	
23/6/2021	(Spain) Bea González (Spain) Lucía Sainz	6–4 / 6–4	(Spain) Carolina Navarro (Argentina) Cecilia Reiter	
23/6/2021	(Spain) Marta Marrero (Spain) Marta Ortega	6–0 / 6–3	(Argentina) Celeste Paz (Spain) Patricia Martinez	
23/6/2021	(Argentina) Catalina Tenorio (Argentina) Julieta Bidahorria	6–4 / 6–4	(Spain) Isabel Domínguez (Spain) Lorena Alonso	
23/6/2021	(Spain) Alba Galán (Spain) Maria Villalba	6–2 / 3–6 / 6–1	(Spain) Marina Lobo (Spain) Sofía Saiz	
23/6/2021	(Spain) Barbara Las Heras (Spain) Carla Mesa	6–3 / 6–7 / 6–3	(Spain) Majo Sánchez (Spain) Mapi Sánchez	
23/6/2021	(Argentina) Delfina Brea (Spain) Tamara Icardo	6–0 / 6–2	(Spain) Nicole Traviesa (Spain) Nuria Rodriguez	
23/6/2021	(Spain) Angela Caro Cantin (Spain) Arantxa Soriano	4–6 / 7–5 / 6–1	(Spain) Maria Pinacho (Spain) Marina Guinart	
23/6/2021	(Spain) Lorena Rufo (Spain) Marta Talavan	6–4 / 6–2	(Venezuela) Ana Alicia Seijas (Spain) Gala León García	
23/6/2021	(Spain) Ariana Sánchez (Spain) Paula Josemaria	6–4 / 6–1	(Portugal) Ana Catarina Nogueira (Spain) Teresa Navarro	

=== Round of 16 ===
Men's
Date	Winners	Score	Opponent	Ref.
24/6/2021	(Spain) Alejandro Galán (Spain) Juan Lebrón	6–2 / 6–3	(Spain) Arturo Coello (Argentina) Miguel Lamperti	
24/6/2021	(Spain) Juan Martín Díaz (Spain) Pablo Lijó	7–5 / 6–4	(Spain) Álvaro Cepero (Brazil) Lucas Campagnolo	
24/6/2021	(Argentina) Martin Di Nenno (Spain) Paquito Navarro	7–5 / 6–2	(Spain) Javier Rico (Spain) Momo González	
24/6/2021	(Argentina) Federico Chingotto (Argentina) Juan Tello	7–6 / 6–3	(Spain) Adrian Blanco (Spain) Javier Barahona	
24/6/2021	(Argentina) Lucho Capra (Argentina) Maxi Sánchez	3–6 / 7–6 / 7–6	(Argentina) Agustín Tapia (Brazil) Pablo Lima	
24/6/2021	(Spain) Iván Ramírez (Spain) Mike Yanguas	6–2 / 6–2	(Spain) Javi Garrido (Argentina) Juan Cruz Belluati	
24/6/2021	(Spain) Juani Mieres (Spain) Martín Sánchez Piñeiro	6–4 / 6–4	(Spain) Anton Sans (Spain) Iñigo Zaratiegui	
24/6/2021	(Argentina) Fernando Belasteguín (Argentina) Sanyo Gutiérrez	3–6 / 6–4 / 7–6	(Spain) Alejandro Arroyo (Spain) Salvador Oria	

Women's
Date	Winners	Score	Opponent	Ref.
24/6/2021	(Spain) Alejandra Salazar (Spain) Gemma Triay	6–1 / 6–1	(Spain) Beatriz Caldera (Spain) Carmen Goenaga	
24/6/2021	(Argentina) Aranzazu Osoro (Spain) Victoria Iglesias	6–2 / 6–2	(Argentina) Claudia Jensen (Spain) Sandra Bellver	
24/6/2021	(Spain) Patricia Llaguno (Argentina) Virginia Riera	6–1 / 6–2	(France) Alix Collombon (Spain) Jessica Castelló	
24/6/2021	(Spain) Bea González (Spain) Lucía Sainz	6–2 / 6–3	(Spain) Esther Carnicero (Brazil) Raquel Piltcher	
24/6/2021	(Spain) Marta Marrero (Spain) Marta Ortega	6–0 / 7–5	(Argentina) Catalina Tenorio (Argentina) Julieta Bidahorria	
24/6/2021	(Spain) Alba Galán (Spain) Maria Villalba	6–2 / 6–3	(Spain) Barbara Las Heras (Spain) Carla Mesa	
24/6/2021	(Argentina) Delfina Brea (Spain) Tamara Icardo	6–0 / 6–0	(Spain) Angela Caro Cantin (Spain) Arantxa Soriano	
24/6/2021	(Spain) Ariana Sánchez (Spain) Paula Josemaria	6–4 / 6–2	(Spain) Lorena Rufo (Spain) Marta Talavan	

=== Quarter-Finals ===
Men's
Date	Winners	Score	Opponent	Ref.
25/6/2021	(Spain) Alejandro Galán (Spain) Juan Lebrón	7–6 / 6–2	(Spain) Juan Martín Díaz (Spain) Pablo Lijó	
25/6/2021	(Argentina) Federico Chingotto (Argentina) Juan Tello	7–6 / 6–3	(Argentina) Martin Di Nenno (Spain) Paquito Navarro	
25/6/2021	(Argentina) Lucho Capra (Argentina) Maxi Sánchez	6–2 / 6–3	(Spain) Iván Ramírez (Spain) Mike Yanguas	
25/6/2021	(Argentina) Fernando Belasteguín (Argentina) Sanyo Gutiérrez	7–5 / 4–6 / 6–3	(Spain) Juani Mieres (Spain) Martín Sánchez Piñeiro	

Women's
Date	Winners	Score	Opponent	Ref.
25/6/2021	(Spain) Alejandra Salazar (Spain) Gemma Triay	7–6 / 6–7 / 6–3	(Argentina) Aranzazu Osoro (Spain) Victoria Iglesias	
25/6/2021	(Spain) Bea González (Spain) Lucía Sainz	6–2 / 6–3	(Spain) Patricia Llaguno (Argentina) Virginia Riera	
25/6/2021	(Spain) Marta Marrero (Spain) Marta Ortega	W.O.	(Spain) Alba Galán (Spain) Maria Villalba	
25/6/2021	(Spain) Ariana Sánchez (Spain) Paula Josemaria	6–1 / 6–4	(Argentina) Delfina Brea (Spain) Tamara Icardo	

=== Semi-Finals ===
Men's
Date	Winners	Score	Opponent	Ref.
26/6/2021	(Argentina) Federico Chingotto (Argentina) Juan Tello	6–4 / 7–6	(Spain) Alejandro Galán (Spain) Juan Lebrón	
26/6/2021	(Argentina) Lucho Capra (Argentina) Maxi Sánchez	6–4 / 3–6 / 6–3	(Argentina) Fernando Belasteguín (Argentina) Sanyo Gutiérrez	

Women's
Date	Winners	Score	Opponent	Ref.
26/6/2021	(Spain) Alejandra Salazar (Spain) Gemma Triay	6–1 / 7–6	(Spain) Bea González (Spain) Lucía Sainz	
26/6/2021	(Spain) Ariana Sánchez (Spain) Paula Josemaria	6–1 / 3–6 / 7–6	(Spain) Marta Marrero (Spain) Marta Ortega	

=== Finals ===
Men's
Date	Winners	Score	Opponent	Ref.
27/6/2021	(Argentina) Lucho Capra (Argentina) Maxi Sánchez	6–3 / 6–4	(Argentina) Federico Chingotto (Argentina) Juan Tello	

Women's
Date	Winners	Score	Opponent	Ref.
27/6/2021	(Spain) Alejandra Salazar (Spain) Gemma Triay	6–3 / 6–3	(Spain) Ariana Sánchez (Spain) Paula Josemaria	
