= 2025 Santiago P1 =

Padel championships

- Date: 23 – 31 March
- Edition: 2nd
- Category: P1
- Prize money: €474.500
- Location: Santiago de Chile, Chile
- Venue: Complejo Deportivo San Carlos de Apoquindo

Champions
- Men's doubles: (Spain) Alejandro Galán (Argentina) Federico Chingotto
- Women's doubles: No winner

Chronology

The 2025 Santiago P1 (officially 2025 Premier Padel Banco de Chile Santiago P1) was the fifth tournament of the fourth season organized by Premier Padel, the premier padel circuit, promoted by the International Padel Federation, and with the financial backing of Nasser Al-Khelaïfi's Qatar Sports Investments.

In the women's category, the top two pairs in the FIP rankings reached the final for the third time in the last four tournaments. The final match pitted Ariana Sánchez and Paula Josemaría against Delfina Brea and Gemma Triay, but the match was delayed due to rain and ultimately suspended with the score at 4–6, 7–6.

In the men's category, the pairings of Franco Stupaczuk & Juan Lebrón and Alejandro Galán & Federico Chingotto once again reached the finals, but were unable to face each other due to Stupaczuk's illness, resulting in Chingotto and Galán claiming their second consecutive title of 2025.

== Relevant Data ==
=== Coello and Tapia's earliest exit in Premier Padel ===
With their early exit, Agustín Tapia and Arturo Coello recorded their worst start to a season since teaming up. By losing in the Round of 16, they not only suffered their earliest elimination in Premier Padel tournaments but also missed out on the finals in two consecutive events (among those they played) for the first time. In contrast, during the previous season, they missed the finals only once across 21 tournaments, in Seville, representing a 95.2% finals appearance rate. Whereas in the three tournaments played in 2025, they reached only one final, with a success rate of 33%.

=== Galán and Lebrón meet again ===
Before forming one of the most successful partnerships in the history of the sport, Alejandro Galán had faced Juan Lebrón twice on the World Padel Tour in 2019. Although Lebrón finished that year as the world number one, he lost both encounters against his future partner, the first in the semifinals of the Valencia Open, where Galán and Pablo Lima defeated Lebrón and Paquito 1–6, 7–5, 6–1, and the second at the Mijas Open, where the Spanish-Brazilian duo once again overcame the Andalusians. And, with the tournament victory secured by Alejandro Galán and Federico Chingotto, Galán extended his winning record over his former partner, Juan Lebrón.

This is the record since the former number ones parted ways:

- Genoa P2 Semifinals (July 2024): Chingotto/Galán vs. Lebrón/Paquito (4–6, 7–5, 6–4)
- Paris Major (October 2024): Semifinals – Chingotto/Galán vs. Lebrón/Di Nenno (6–2, 6–2)
- Milan P1 Semifinals (December 2024): Chingotto/Galán vs. Lebrón/Di Nenno (6–1, 6–4)
- Miami P1 Finals (March 2025): Chingotto/Galán vs. Stupa/Lebrón (6–1, 7–6)
- Santiago P1 Finals (March 2025): Chingotto/Galán vs. Stupa/Lebrón (Walkover)

== Seeds ==
Male

Rnk.	Team	FIP Ranking Points
1	(Argentina) Agustín Tapia (Spain) Arturo Coello	39960
2	(Spain) Alejandro Galán (Argentina) Federico Chingotto	24780
3	(Argentina) Franco Stupaczuk (Spain) Juan Lebrón	17500
4	(Spain) Coki Nieto (Spain) Mike Yanguas	13720
5	(Spain) Javi Garrido (Argentina) Martin Di Nenno	12905
6	(Spain) Jon Sanz (Spain) Momo Gonzalez	10465
7	(Brazil) Lucas Bergamini (Spain) Paquito Navarro	8610
8	(Spain) Alejandro Arroyo (Spain) Eduardo Alonso	7002
9	(Argentina) Leandro Augsburguer (Spain) Pablo Cardona	5685
10	(Argentina) Alex Chozas (Spain) Álex Ruiz	4927
11	(Spain) Javi Leal (Argentina) Sanyo Gutiérrez	4530
12	(Spain) Francisco Guerrero (Spain) Jairo Bautista	4337
13	(Argentina) Juan Tello (Argentina) Valentino Libaak	3978
14	(Brazil) Lucas Campagnolo (Argentina) Maxi Sanchéz	3935
15	(Spain) Javier Barahona (Spain) Javier Garcia Mora	3329
16	(Spain) Javi Ruiz (Spain) Jose Garcia Diestro	2943

Female

Rnk.	Team	FIP Ranking Points
1	(Spain) Ariana Sánchez (Spain) Paula Josemaria	33380
2	(Argentina) Delfina Brea (Spain) Gemma Triay	25260
3	(Spain) Bea González (Spain) Claudia Fernandéz	21380
4	(Spain) Marta Ortega (Portugal) Sofia Araújo	14810
5	(Spain) Lucia Sainz (Spain) Patricia Llaguno	10960
6	(Spain) Alejandra Alonso (Spain) Andrea Ustero	10595
7	(Spain) Alejandra Salazar (Spain) Veronica Virseda	10240
8	(Argentina) Aranzazu Osoro (Spain) Jessica Castello	9755
9	(Argentina) Claudia Jensen (Spain) Tamara Icardo	9470
10	(Spain) Marta Marrero (Argentina) Virginia Riera	4791
11	(Spain) Beatriz Caldera (Spain) Carmen Goenaga	4640
12	(Spain) Marina Guinart (Spain) Victoria Iglesias	3883
13	(Italy) Carolina Orsi (Spain) Nuria Rodriguez	3883
14	(France) Alix Collombon (Spain) Araceli Martinez	3818
15	(Russia) Ksenia Sharifova (Spain) Marta Talavan	3538
16	(Argentina) Julieta Bidahorria (Spain) Lucia Martinez Gomez	3451

== Head-to-head record between teams ranked in the top 4 during the season ==
=== Man's ===
Record	Coello–Tapia	Galán–Chingotto	Lebrón–Stupaczuk	Coki–Yanguas
Coello–Tapia	—	—	1–1	1–0
Galán–Chingotto	—	—	2–0	2–0
Lebrón–Stupaczuk	1–1	0–2	—	—
Coki–Yanguas	0–1	0–2	—	—

=== Women's ===
Record	Ariana–Paula	D. Brea–Triay	Gonzalez–Fernandez	Araújo–Ortega
Ariana–Paula	—	0–2	3–0	1–1
D. Brea–Triay	2–0	—	0–1	3–0
Gonzalez–Fernandez	0–3	1–0	—	—
Araújo–Ortega	1–1	0–3	—	—

Because the Santiago final ended in a draw, it is not counted.

== Draws ==
=== Men's Bracket ===
Round of 32
1	(Spain) Coello / (Argentina) Tapia	6	6
25	(Argentina) A. Gutiérrez / (Spain) J. Rico	2	4
32	(Spain) I. Vilariño / (Spain) J. Munoz
9	(Argentina) L. Augsburger / (Spain) P. Cardona	*
13	(Argentina) J. Tello / (Argentina) V. Libaak	7	7
34	(United Arab Emirates) A. Ayats / (Spain) P.G. Rodrigo	6	6
31	(Portugal) M. Deus / (Portugal) N. Deus	4	6	3
7	(Brazil) L. Bergamini / (Spain) Paquito	6	4	6
8	(Spain) A. Arroyo / (Spain) E. Alonso	3	7	4
37	(Spain) A. Sans / (Spain) M. Quilez	6	6	6
22	(United Arab Emirates) I. Jofre / (Spain) L.H. Quesada	4	3
15	(Spain) J. Barahona / (Spain) J.G. Mora	6	6
16	(Spain) J. Ruiz / (Spain) J.G. Diestro	3	2
18	(Argentina) G. Alfonso / (Argentina) L. Aguirre	6	6
27	(Spain) J.J. Casas / (Argentina) R. Moyano	1	2
3	(Spain) Lebrón / (Argentina) Stupaczuk	6	6
4	(Spain) Coki / (Spain) Yanguas	6	6
36	(Spain) D. Sastre / (Argentina) M. Lamperti	2	3
20	(Spain) G. Rubio / (Spain) P. Lijó	5	4
10	(Argentina) A. Chozas / (Spain) A. Ruiz	7	6
14	(Brazil) L. Campagnolo / (Argentina) Maxi	6	2
21	(Spain) F. Gil / (Spain) V. Ruiz	7	6
Q	(Spain) A. Jimenez / (United Kingdom) C. Murphy	3	4
5	(Spain) J. Garrido / (Argentina) Di Nenno	6	6
6	(Spain) J. Sanz / (Spain) Momo	7	6
26	(Spain) A. Cepero / (Argentina) E. Torre	6	2
Q	(Spain) Á. Amaya / (Italy) F. Dominguez	3	3
11	(Spain) J. Leal / (Argentina) Sanyo	6	6
12	(Spain) F. Guerrero / (Spain) J. Bautista	6	6
35	(Spain) P. Alvarez / (Argentina) R. Valenzuela	4	4
19	(Spain) E. Goenaga / (Spain) T. Zapata	3	1
2	(Spain) Galán / (Argentina) Chingotto

Round of 16
1	(Spain) Coello / (Argentina) Tapia	6	4
9	(Argentina) L. Augsburger / (Spain) P. Cardona	7	6
13	(Argentina) J. Tello / (Argentina) V. Libaak	7	5	7
7	(Brazil) L. Bergamini / (Spain) Paquito	5	7	5
37	(Spain) A. Sans / (Spain) M. Quilez	2	4
15	(Spain) J. Barahona / (Spain) J.G. Mora	6	6
18	(Argentina) G. Alfonso / (Argentina) L. Aguirre	7	4	2
3	(Spain) Lebrón / (Argentina) Stupaczuk	6	6	6
4	(Spain) Coki / (Spain) Yanguas	6	6	6
10	(Argentina) A. Chozas / (Spain) A. Ruiz	7	1	4
21	(Spain) F. Gil / (Spain) V. Ruiz	6	2	6
5	(Spain) J. Garrido / (Argentina) Di Nenno	4	6	4
6	(Spain) J. Sanz / (Spain) Momo	6	6	6
11	(Spain) J. Leal / (Argentina) Sanyo	7	0	1
12	(Spain) F. Guerrero / (Spain) J. Bautista	3	2
2	(Spain) Galán / (Argentina) Chingotto	6	6

Quarter-Final
9	(Argentina) L. Augsburger / (Spain) P. Cardona	6	7	3
13	(Argentina) J. Tello / (Argentina) V. Libaak	7	6	6
15	(Spain) J. Barahona / (Spain) J.G. Mora	6	6
3	(Spain) Lebrón / (Argentina) Stupaczuk	7	7
4	(Spain) Coki / (Spain) Yanguas	6	6
21	(Spain) F. Gil / (Spain) V. Ruiz	4	0
6	(Spain) J. Sanz / (Spain) Momo	3	2
2	(Spain) Galán / (Argentina) Chingotto	6	6

Semi-Finals
13	(Argentina) J. Tello / (Argentina) V. Libaak	6	3	1
3	(Spain) Lebrón / (Argentina) Stupaczuk	3	6	6
4	(Spain) Coki / (Spain) Yanguas	6	2
2	(Spain) Galán / (Argentina) Chingotto	7	6

Finals
3	(Spain) Lebrón / (Argentina) Stupaczuk
2	(Spain) Lebrón / (Argentina) Stupaczuk	*

=== Women's Bracket ===
Round of 32
1	(Spain) A. Sánchez / (Spain) P. Josemaria
Bye
13	(Italy) C. Orsi / (Spain) N. Rodriguez	6	6
18	(Spain) J. Velasco / (Spain) N. Canovas	2	2
10	(Spain) M. Marrero / (Argentina) V. Riera	6	6
22	(Spain) M. Lobo / (Spain) S. Saiz	7	7
15	(Russia) K. Sharifova / (Spain) M. Talavan	3	1
7	(Spain) A. Salazar / (Spain) V. Virseda	6	6
8	(Argentina) A. Osoro / (Spain) J. Castelló	6	6
19	(Italy) G. Marchetti / (Spain) S. Ruiz	1	2
Q	(Spain) M. Barrera / (Spain) M. Caparrós	3	6	6
Q	(Spain) C. Mesa / (Spain) L. Lujan	6	3	4
23	(Spain) M.R. Abajo / (Spain) R. Barrera	4	6	6
21	(Portugal) A. Nogueira / (Argentina) M. Goyeneche	6	4	2
Bye
3	(Spain) B. González / (Spain) C. Fernandéz
4	(Spain) M. Ortega / (Portugal) S. Araújo
Bye
12	(Spain) M. Guinart / (Spain) V. Iglesias	6	6
20	(Spain) B. Las Heras / (Spain) E. Carnicero	0	2
Q	(Spain) A. Perez / (Spain) M. Merino	4	6
16	(Argentina) J. Bidahorria / (Spain) L. Martinez	6	7
14	(France) A. Collombon / (Spain) A. Martinez	4	3
6	(Spain) A. Alonso / (Spain) A. Ustero	6	6
5	(Spain) L. Sainz / (Spain) P. Llaguno	6	6	5
9	(Argentina) C. Jensen / (Spain) T. Icardo	1	7	7
WC	(Chile) C. Arancibia / (Chile) K. Carrasco	2	2
11	(Spain) B. Caldera / (Spain) C. Goenaga	6	6
17	(Spain) L. Arruabarrena / (Spain) L. Rufo	4	0
Q	(Spain) M. Borrero / (Spain) M. Santamaria
Bye
2	(Argentina) D. Brea / (Spain) G. Triay

Round of 16
1	(Spain) A. Sánchez / (Spain) P. Josemaria	7	7
13	(Italy) C. Orsi / (Spain) N. Rodriguez	5	6
22	(Spain) M. Lobo / (Spain) S. Saiz	5	3
7	(Spain) A. Salazar / (Spain) V. Virseda	7	6
8	(Argentina) A. Osoro / (Spain) J. Castelló	6	4	7
Q	(Spain) M. Barrera / (Spain) M. Caparrós	3	6	5
23	(Spain) M.R. Abajo / (Spain) R. Barrera	0	6
3	(Spain) B. González / (Spain) C. Fernandéz	6	7
4	(Spain) M. Ortega / (Portugal) S. Araújo	6	4	5
12	(Spain) M. Guinart / (Spain) V. Iglesias	3	6	7
16	(Argentina) J. Bidahorria / (Spain) L. Martinez	6	4	3
6	(Spain) A. Alonso / (Spain) A. Ustero	3	6	6
9	(Argentina) C. Jensen / (Spain) T. Icardo	6	6
11	(Spain) B. Caldera / (Spain) C. Goenaga	3	3
Q	(Spain) M. Borrero / (Spain) M. Santamaria	0	3
2	(Argentina) D. Brea / (Spain) G. Triay	6	6

Quarter-Final
1	(Spain) A. Sánchez / (Spain) P. Josemaria	6	7
7	(Spain) A. Salazar / (Spain) V. Virseda	1	5
8	(Argentina) A. Osoro / (Spain) J. Castelló	1	4
3	(Spain) B. González / (Spain) C. Fernandéz	6	6
12	(Spain) M. Guinart / (Spain) V. Iglesias	4	4
6	(Spain) A. Alonso / (Spain) A. Ustero	6	6
9	(Argentina) C. Jensen / (Spain) T. Icardo	4	3
2	(Argentina) D. Brea / (Spain) G. Triay	6	6

Semi-Finals
1	(Spain) A. Sánchez / (Spain) P. Josemaria	2	6	6
3	(Spain) B. González / (Spain) C. Fernandéz	6	3	3
6	(Spain) A. Alonso / (Spain) A. Ustero	1	2
2	(Argentina) D. Brea / (Spain) G. Triay	6	6

Finals
1	(Spain) A. Sánchez / (Spain) P. Josemaria	4	7	*
2	(Argentina) D. Brea / (Spain) G. Triay	6	6	*

== Results ==
=== First Round ===
Men's

Date	Winners	Score	Opponent	Refs.
25/3/2025	(Argentina) Agustin Gutiérrez (Spain) José Rico	7–6 / 7–5	(Chile) Cristobal Martinez (Argentina) Pablo Molina	
25/3/2025	(Spain) Ignacio Vilariño (Spain) Jaime Muñoz	6–4 / 6–7 / 7–6	(Spain) Guillermo Collado (France) Thomas Leygue	
25/3/2025	(United Arab Emirates) Arnau Ayats (Spain) Pablo García Rodrigo	7–5 / 7–5	(Spain) Javier Martinez (Spain) Miguel Benitez	
25/3/2025	(Portugal) Miguel Deus (Portugal) Nuno Deus	6–1 / 7–5	(Spain) Rafael Mendéz (Spain) Toni Bueno	
25/3/2025	(Spain) Anton Sans Riola (Spain) Marc Quilez	6–2 / 6–7 / 6–4	(Spain) Emilio Sanchez Chamero (Chile) Javier Valdes	
25/3/2025	(United Arab Emirates) Iñigo Jofre (Spain) Luis Hernandez Quesada	7–6 / 6–7 / 6–3	(Spain) Diego Gil Batista (Spain) Mario Ortega	
25/3/2025	(Argentina) Gonzalo Alfonso (Argentina) Leonel Aguirre	6–1 / 6–4	(Argentina) Axel Guevara (Argentina) Manuel Gayone	
25/3/2025	(Spain) Jose Jimenez Casas (Argentina) Ramiro Moyano	3–6 / 6–4 / 7–6	(Spain) Juanlu Esbri (Spain) Salvador Oria	
25/3/2025	(Spain) Daniel Santigosa (Argentina) Miguel Lamperti	7–6 / 6–4	(Argentina) Federico Mouriño (Spain) Pincho Fernandez	
25/3/2025	(Spain) Gonzalo Rubio (Spain) Pablo Lijó	6–7 / 7–5 / 6–4	(Italy) Aris Patiniotis (Spain) David Gala Sanchez	
25/3/2025	(Spain) Francisco Gil Morales (Spain) Victor Ruiz	6–3 / 4–6 / 7–6	(Argentina) Ignacio Piotto (Spain) Mario Del Castillo	
25/3/2025	(Spain) Alberto Jimenez (United Kingdom) Christian Murphy	6–3 / 6–4	(Spain) Fran Ramirez (Spain) Gerard Arnaldos	
25/3/2025	(Spain) Alvero Cepero (Argentina) Eduardo Agustin Torre	6–1 / 3–6 / 6–3	(Spain) Ignacio Sager (Argentina) Juan Cruz Belluati	
25/3/2025	(Spain) Alvaro Melendez Amaya (Italy) Facundo Dominguez	6–2 / 6–3	(Belgium) Clement Geens (Sweden) Simon Vasquez	
25/3/2025	(Spain) Pol Hernandez (Argentina) Ramiro Valenzuela	6–1 / 6–1	(Chile) Alonso Villavicencio (Chile) Joaquin Escalona	
25/3/2025	(Spain) Enrique Goenaga (Spain) Teodoro Zapata	6–1 / 6–2	(Spain) Diego García (Spain) Francisco Cabeza	

=== Round of 32 ===
Men's

Date	Winners	Score	Opponent	Refs.
26/3/2025	(Argentina) Agustín Tapia (Spain) Arturo Coello	6–2 / 6–4	(Argentina) Agustin Gutiérrez (Spain) José Rico	
26/3/2025	(Argentina) Leandro Augsburger (Spain) Pablo Cardona	W.O.	(Spain) Ignacio Vilariño (Spain) Jaime Muñoz	
26/3/2025	(Argentina) Juan Tello (Argentina) Valentino Libaak	7–6 / 7–6	(United Arab Emirates) Arnau Ayats (Spain) Pablo García Rodrigo	
26/3/2025	(Brazil) Lucas Bergamini (Spain) Paquito Navarro	6–4 / 4–6 / 6–3	(Portugal) Miguel Deus (Portugal) Nuno Deus	
26/3/2025	(Spain) Anton Sans Riola (Spain) Marc Quilez	6–3 / 6–7 / 6–4	(Spain) Alex Arroyo (Spain) Eduardo Alonso	
26/3/2025	(Spain) Javier García Mora (Spain) Javier Gonzalez Barahona	6–4 / 6–3	(United Arab Emirates) Iñigo Jofre (Spain) Luis Hernandez Quesada	
26/3/2025	(Argentina) Gonzalo Alfonso (Argentina) Leonel Aguirre	6–3 / 6–2	(Spain) Javi Ruiz (Spain) Jose García Diestro	
26/3/2025	(Argentina) Franco Stupaczuk (Spain) Juan Lebrón	6–1 / 6–2	(Spain) Jose Jimenez Casas (Argentina) Ramiro Moyano	
26/3/2025	(Spain) Coki Nieto (Spain) Mike Yanguas	6–2 / 6–3	(Spain) Daniel Santigosa (Argentina) Miguel Lamperti	
26/3/2025	(Argentina) Alex Chozas (Spain) Alex Ruiz	7–5 / 6–4	(Spain) Gonzalo Rubio (Spain) Pablo Lijó	
26/3/2025	(Spain) Francisco Gil Morales (Spain) Victor Ruiz	7–6 / 6–2	(Brazil) Lucas Campagnolo (Argentina) Maxi Sánchez	
26/3/2025	(Spain) Javi Garrido (Argentina) Martin Di Nenno	6–3 / 6–4	(Spain) Alberto Jimenez (United Kingdom) Christian Murphy	
26/3/2025	(Spain) Jon Sanz (Spain) Momo Gonzalez	7–6 / 6–2	(Spain) Alvero Cepero (Argentina) Eduardo Agustin Torre	
26/3/2025	(Spain) Javier Leal (Argentina) Sanyo Gutiérrez	6–3 / 6–3	(Spain) Alvaro Melendez Amaya (Italy) Facundo Dominguez	
26/3/2025	(Spain) Francisco Guerrero (Spain) Jairo Bautista	6–4 / 6–4	(Spain) Pol Hernandez (Argentina) Ramiro Valenzuela	
26/3/2025	(Spain) Alejandro Galán (Argentina) Federico Chingotto	6–3 / 6–1	(Spain) Enrique Goenaga (Spain) Teodoro Zapata	

Women's

Date	Winners	Score	Opponent	Refs.
25/3/2025	(Italy) Carolina Orsi (Spain) Nuria Rodriguez	6–2 / 6–2	(Spain) Jimena Velasco (Spain) Noa Canovas	
25/3/2025	(Spain) Marina Martinez Lobo (Spain) Sofía Saiz Vallejo	7–6 / 7–6	(Spain) Marta Marrero (Argentina) Virginia Riera	
25/3/2025	(Spain) Alejandra Salazar (Spain) Verónica Virseda	6–3 / 6–1	(Russia) Ksenia Sharifova (Spain) Marta Talavan	
25/3/2025	(Argentina) Aranzazu Osoro (Spain) Jessica Castelló	6–1 / 6–2	(Italy) Giorgia Marchetti (Spain) Sara Ruiz	
26/3/2025	(Spain) Marta Barrera (Spain) Marta Caparrós	3–6 / 6–3 / 6–4	(Spain) Carla Mesa (Spain) Laura Lujan Rodriguez	
25/3/2025	(Spain) Laia Rodriguez Abajo (Spain) Raquel Eugenio Barrera	4–6 / 6–4 / 6–2	(Portugal) Ana Catarina Nogueira (Argentina) Martina Fassio Goyeneche	
25/3/2025	(Spain) Marina Guinart (Spain) Victoria Iglesias	6–0 / 6–2	(Spain) Barbara Las Heras (Spain) Esther Carnicero	
26/3/2025	(Argentina) Julieta Bidahorria (Spain) Lucia Martinez Gomez	6–4 / 7–6	(Spain) Agueda Perez (Spain) Melania Merino	
26/3/2025	(Spain) Alejandra Alonso (Spain) Andrea Ustero	6–4 / 6–3	(France) Alix Collombon (Spain) Araceli Martinez	
26/3/2025	(Argentina) Claudia Jensen (Spain) Tamara Icardo	1–6 / 7–6 / 7–5	(Spain) Lucia Sainz (Spain) Patricia Llaguno	
26/3/2025	(Spain) Beatriz Caldera (Spain) Carmen Goenaga	6–2 / 6–2	(Chile) Catalina Arancibia (Chile) Kimberley Ahumada	
26/3/2025	(Spain) Marta Borrero (Spain) Martina Calvo Santamaria	6–4 / 6–0	(Spain) Lara Arruabarrena (Spain) Lorena Rufo	

=== Round of 16 ===
Men's

Date	Winners	Score	Opponent	Refs.
27/3/2025	(Argentina) Leandro Augsburger (Spain) Pablo Cardona	7–6 / 6–4	(Argentina) Agustín Tapia (Spain) Arturo Coello	
27/3/2025	(Argentina) Juan Tello (Argentina) Valentino Libaak	7–5 / 5–7 / 7–5	(Brazil) Lucas Bergamini (Spain) Paquito Navarro	
27/3/2025	(Spain) Javier García Mora (Spain) Javier Gonzalez Barahona	6–2 / 6–4	(Spain) Anton Sans Riola (Spain) Marc Quilez	
27/3/2025	(Argentina) Franco Stupaczuk (Spain) Juan Lebrón	6–7 / 6–4 / 6–2	(Argentina) Gonzalo Alfonso (Argentina) Leonel Aguirre	
27/3/2025	(Spain) Coki Nieto (Spain) Mike Yanguas	6–7 / 6–1 / 6–4	(Argentina) Alex Chozas (Spain) Alex Ruiz	
27/3/2025	(Spain) Francisco Gil Morales (Spain) Victor Ruiz	6–4 / 2–6 / 6–4	(Spain) Javi Garrido (Argentina) Martin Di Nenno	
27/3/2025	(Spain) Jon Sanz (Spain) Momo Gonzalez	6–7 / 6–0 / 6–1	(Spain) Javier Leal (Argentina) Sanyo Gutiérrez	
27/3/2025	(Spain) Alejandro Galán (Argentina) Federico Chingotto	6–3 / 6–2	(Spain) Francisco Guerrero (Spain) Jairo Bautista	

Women's

Date	Winners	Score	Opponent	Refs.
27/3/2025	(Spain) Ariana Sánchez (Spain) Paula Josemaría	7–5 / 7–6	(Italy) Carolina Orsi (Spain) Nuria Rodriguez	
27/3/2025	(Spain) Alejandra Salazar (Spain) Verónica Virseda	7–5 / 6–3	(Spain) Marina Martinez Lobo (Spain) Sofía Saiz Vallejo	
27/3/2025	(Argentina) Aranzazu Osoro (Spain) Jessica Castelló	6–3 / 4–6 / 7–5	(Spain) Marta Barrera (Spain) Marta Caparrós	
27/3/2025	(Spain) Bea González (Spain) Claudia Fernández	6–0 / 7–6	(Spain) Laia Rodriguez Abajo (Spain) Raquel Eugenio Barrera	
27/3/2025	(Spain) Marina Guinart (Spain) Victoria Iglesias	3–6 / 6–4 / 7–5	(Spain) Marta Ortega (Portugal) Sofia Araújo	
27/3/2025	(Spain) Alejandra Alonso (Spain) Andrea Ustero	3–6 / 6–4 / 6–3	(Argentina) Julieta Bidahorria (Spain) Lucia Martinez Gomez	
27/3/2025	(Argentina) Claudia Jensen (Spain) Tamara Icardo	6–3 / 6–3	(Spain) Beatriz Caldera (Spain) Carmen Goenaga	
27/3/2025	(Argentina) Delfina Brea (Spain) Gemma Triay	6–0 / 6–3	(Spain) Marta Borrero (Spain) Martina Calvo Santamaria	

=== Quarter-Finals ===
Men's

Date	Winners	Score	Opponent	Refs.
28/3/2025	(Argentina) Juan Tello (Argentina) Valentino Libaak	7–6 / 6–7 / 6–3	(Argentina) Leandro Augsburger (Spain) Pablo Cardona	
28/3/2025	(Argentina) Franco Stupaczuk (Spain) Juan Lebrón	7–6 / 7–6	(Spain) Javier García Mora (Spain) Javier Gonzalez Barahona	
28/3/2025	(Spain) Coki Nieto (Spain) Mike Yanguas	6–4 / 6–0	(Spain) Francisco Gil Morales (Spain) Victor Ruiz	
28/3/2025	(Spain) Alejandro Galán (Argentina) Federico Chingotto	6–3 / 6–2	(Spain) Jon Sanz (Spain) Momo Gonzalez	

Women's

Date	Winners	Score	Opponent	Refs.
28/3/2025	(Spain) Ariana Sánchez (Spain) Paula Josemaría	6–1 / 7–5	(Spain) Alejandra Salazar (Spain) Verónica Virseda	
28/3/2025	(Spain) Bea González (Spain) Claudia Fernández	6–1 / 6–4	(Argentina) Aranzazu Osoro (Spain) Jessica Castelló	
28/3/2025	(Spain) Alejandra Alonso (Spain) Andrea Ustero	6–4 / 6–4	(Spain) Marina Guinart (Spain) Victoria Iglesias	
28/3/2025	(Argentina) Delfina Brea (Spain) Gemma Triay	6–4 / 6–3	(Argentina) Claudia Jensen (Spain) Tamara Icardo	

=== Semi-Finals ===
Men's

Date	Winners	Score	Opponent	Refs.
29/3/2025	(Argentina) Franco Stupaczuk (Spain) Juan Lebrón	3–6 / 6–3 / 6–1	(Argentina) Juan Tello (Argentina) Valentino Libaak	
29/3/2025	(Spain) Alejandro Galán (Argentina) Federico Chingotto	7–6 / 6–2	(Spain) Coki Nieto (Spain) Mike Yanguas	

Women's

Date	Winners	Score	Opponent	Refs.
29/3/2025	(Spain) Ariana Sánchez (Spain) Paula Josemaría	2–6 / 6–3 / 6–3	(Spain) Bea González (Spain) Claudia Fernández	
29/3/2025	(Argentina) Delfina Brea (Spain) Gemma Triay	6–1 / 6–2	(Spain) Alejandra Alonso (Spain) Andrea Ustero	

=== Finals ===
Men's

Date	Winners	Score	Opponent	Refs.
31/3/2025	(Spain) Alejandro Galán (Argentina) Federico Chingotto	W.O.	(Argentina) Franco Stupaczuk (Spain) Juan Lebrón	

Women's

Date	Winners	Score	Opponent	Refs.
31/3/2025	(Spain) Ariana Sánchez (Spain) Paula Josemaría	No winner (4–6 / 7–6)	(Argentina) Delfina Brea (Spain) Gemma Triay	
