= 2019 WPT Marbella Master =

World Padel Tour tournament held in Marbella, Spain

- Date: 17 – 24 March
- Edition: 9th (Note: The first seven editions were held under the organization of the Padel Pro Tour, while the eight edition was contested as a Open tournament.)
- Category: Master
- Location: Marbella, Spain
- Venue: Palacio de los Deportes San Pedro Alcántara

Champions
- Men's doubles: (Argentina) Maxi Sánchez (Argentina) Sanyo Gutiérrez
- Women's doubles: (Spain) Marta Marrero (Spain) Marta Ortega

Chronology
Previous
Master Final
(2018)
Next
Logroño Open

The 2019 Marbella Master (officially 2019 World Padel Tour Cervezas Victoria Marbella Master) was the first tournament of the seventh season organized by World Padel Tour, the most prestigious padel circuit at the time.

In the women's category, the pairs ranked 2nd and 3rd by FIP both reached the final in their first tournament together. In the decisive match, the world No. 3 pair, "the Martas," Marta Marrero and Marta Ortega, defeated their former partners, the 2nd-ranked pair of Ariana Sánchez and Alejandra Salazar, in three sets. This made them the first pair to win a title this season, with both players securing a tournament win in Marbella for the first time.

In the men’s category, Maxi Sánchez and Sanyo Gutiérrez continued their strong form from the previous season, reaching their fourth consecutive final. Their opponents, however, were the new world number 3 pair, Juan Lebrón and Paquito Navarro, who reached the finals in their first tournament together, having eliminated Fernando Belasteguín and Pablo Lima (the second ranked pair) in the semifinals. In the decisive match, the world number 1s defeated Lebrón and Paquito in straight sets, becoming the first champions of the season on the men’s circuit and securing the first title in Marbella for both Maxi and Sanyo.

== Relevant Data ==
=== Changes in the rankings and new pairs ===
==== Marrero with Ortega and Ariana with Salazar ====
The rumor began circulating in September and was confirmed two days after the end of the season: the pairs that finished 2018 ranked second and fourth in the women’s standings split up and reorganized to compete in the 2019 World Padel Tour. Marta Marrero teamed up with Marta Ortega, while Alejandra Salazar joined forces with Ariana Sánchez.

==== Shoulder injury forces separation of the Sánchez Alayeto twins ====
Mapi Sánchez, one half of the world’s number-one ranked pair, would be sidelined for approximately four months following surgery for a shoulder injury. As a result, she would miss the start of the WPT season, marking the first time since they turned professional that she and her sister, Majo, would not play together. Majo would instead partner with 20-year-old Argentine player Delfina Brea, who was in the 20th spot in the world rankings. The new duo would begin the season as the fourth-highest-ranked pair on the circuit.

==== Paquito Navarro chooses Lebrón for 2019, and Stupa joins Matí Díaz ====
The most significant change on the men’s side was the partnership between Paquito Navarro and 2018’s breakout player, Juan Lebrón, who moved to the 'drive' (right-hand) side. They began as the third-ranked pair, sitting less than 2,000 points behind the pair of Fernando Belasteguín and Pablo Lima. Meanwhile, Franco Stupaczuk is parting ways with Cristian Gutiérrez to team up with Matí Díaz, and Alejandro Galán is joining forces with Juani Mieres, rounding out the top five.

=== Ana Catarina Nogueira makes history ===
Entering the tournament as the 12th-ranked pair alongside Paula Josemaria, Ana Catarina Nogueira, after eliminating the top-seeded duo of Gemma Triay and Lucia Sainz in the round of 16, made history by becoming the first Portuguese player to reach a World Padel Tour semifinal.

== Head-to-head record between teams ranked in the top 4 during the season ==
=== Men's ===
Record	Maxi–Sanyo	Belasteguín–Lima	Lebrón–Paquito	Galán–J. Mieres
Maxi–Sanyo	—	—	1–0	1–0
Belasteguín–Lima	—	—	0–1	—
Lebrón–Paquito	0–1	1–0	—	—
Galán–J. Mieres	0–1	—	—	—

=== Women's ===
Record	Triay–Sainz	Ariana–Salazar	Marrero–Ortega	Delfina–Majo
Triay–Sainz	—	—	—	—
Ariana–Salazar	—	—	0–1	1–0
Marrero–Ortega	—	1–0	—	—
Delfina–Majo	—	0–1	—	—

== Draws ==
=== Men's Bracket ===
Round of 32
1	(Argentina) Maxi / (Argentina) Sanyo	3	5	*
(Spain) Á. Cepero / (Argentina) S. Nerone	6	1
(Spain) Coki / (Spain) J. Rico	3	4
Q	(Spain) A. Luque / (Spain) J. Barahona	6	6
(Argentina) F. Quiles / (Spain) J.G. Diestro	6	6
(Uruguay) D. Ramos / (Argentina) J. Restivo	1	2
11	(Argentina) A. Allemandi / (Argentina) A. Silingo	6	6	6
5	(Argentina) F. Stupaczuk / (Spain) M. Díaz	3	7	3
6	(Spain) J. Ruiz / (Spain) U. Botello	2	6	6
(Spain) J. Rico / (Spain) V. Ruiz	6	1	3
(Brazil) F. Gomes / (Argentina) G. Tamame	3	6
(Spain) A. Ruiz / (Spain) M. Piñeiro	6	7
(Argentina) F. Chingotto / (Argentina) J. Tello	4	6	6
(Spain) G. Rubio / (Spain) E. Moreno	6	2	1
(Argentina) F. Poggi / (Argentina) M. Grabiel	3	5
4	(Spain) Galán / (Spain) J. Mieres	6	7
3	(Spain) Lebrón / (Spain) Paquito	6	6
Q	(Spain) M. Solbes / (Spain) J. Gutiérrez	3	0
(Argentina) J. Vazquez / (Brazil) M. Jardim	7	0	4
13	(Spain) N. Gadea / (Spain) R. Méndez	6	6	6
(Spain) J.C. Belluati / (Spain) P. Lijó	3	6	2
(Argentina) M. Nicoletti / (Spain) P.A. Martínez	6	4	6
Q	(Spain) Coello / (Spain) P. Fernandez	0	2
7	(Argentina) L. Capra / (Argentina) M. Lamperti	6	6
8	(Argentina) C. Gutiérrez / (Argentina) R. Moyano	4	1
12	(Brazil) L. Bergamini / (Brazil) L. Campagnolo	6	6
(Argentina) A. Patiniotis / (Spain) J. Muñoz	6	5	3
Q	(Spain) A. Blanco / (Spain) J. Vazquez	4	7	6
9	(Spain) J.M. Díaz / (Argentina) Tapia	6	6
(Spain) M. Marina / (Spain) Momo	4	2
(Spain) A. Santana / (Argentina) Godo Díaz	3	4
2	(Argentina) Belasteguín / (Brazil) Lima	6	6

Round of 16
1	(Argentina) Maxi / (Argentina) Sanyo	6	6
Q	(Spain) A. Luque / (Spain) J. Barahona	2	2
(Argentina) F. Quiles / (Spain) J.G. Diestro	3	1
11	(Argentina) A. Allemandi / (Argentina) A. Silingo	6	6
6	(Spain) J. Ruiz / (Spain) U. Botello	6	6
(Spain) A. Ruiz / (Spain) M. Piñeiro	2	2
(Argentina) F. Chingotto / (Argentina) J. Tello	2	5
4	(Spain) Galán / (Spain) J. Mieres	6	7
3	(Spain) Lebrón / (Spain) Paquito	6	6
13	(Spain) N. Gadea / (Spain) R. Méndez	2	3
(Argentina) M. Nicoletti / (Spain) P.A. Martínez	3	1
7	(Argentina) L. Capra / (Argentina) M. Lamperti	6	6
12	(Brazil) L. Bergamini / (Brazil) L. Campagnolo	6	6
(Spain) A. Blanco / (Spain) J. Vazquez	4	4
9	(Spain) J.M. Díaz / (Argentina) Tapia	4	7	3
2	(Argentina) Belasteguín / (Brazil) Lima	6	6	6

Quarter-Final
1	(Argentina) Maxi / (Argentina) Sanyo	1	6	6
11	(Argentina) A. Allemandi / (Argentina) A. Silingo	6	2	1
6	(Spain) J. Ruiz / (Spain) U. Botello
4	(Spain) Galán / (Spain) J. Mieres	*
3	(Spain) Lebrón / (Spain) Paquito	6	7
7	(Argentina) L. Capra / (Argentina) M. Lamperti	4	6
12	(Brazil) L. Bergamini / (Brazil) L. Campagnolo	3	3
2	(Argentina) Belasteguín / (Brazil) Lima	6	6

Semi-Finals
1	(Argentina) Maxi / (Argentina) Sanyo	6	6
4	(Spain) Galán / (Spain) J. Mieres	3	4
3	(Spain) Lebrón / (Spain) Paquito	4	7	6
2	(Argentina) Belasteguín / (Brazil) Lima	6	5	1

Finals
1	(Argentina) Maxi / (Argentina) Sanyo	6	7
3	(Spain) Lebrón / (Spain) Paquito	1	6

=== Women's Bracket ===
Round of 32
1	(Spain) Gemma / (Spain) L. Sainz
Bye
Q	(Spain) A. Rico / (Spain) I. Arzamendi	3	2
(Portugal) A.C. Nogueira / (Spain) P. Josemaría	6	6
(Spain) S. Hernández / (Spain) T. Icardo	6	6
(France) A. Collombon / (Spain) N. Traviesa	4	4
(Spain) N. Rovira / (Brazil) R. Piltcher	1	5
(Spain) B. González / (Argentina) C. Tenorio	6	7
(Spain) M. Villalba / (Spain) T. Navarro	6	6
Q	(Belgium) H. Wyckaert / (Spain) M. Pinacho	1	1
(Spain) A. Galán / (Spain) V. Iglesias	6	6
(Spain) A. Tapia / (Spain) J. Castelló	4	4
(Spain) A. Blanco / (Spain) B. Caldera	6	6
(Spain) A.F. de Ossó / (Spain) S. Pujals	1	1
Bye
3	(Spain) M. Marrero / (Spain) M. Ortega
4	(Argentina) D. Brea / (Spain) Majo
Bye
Q	(Spain) C. Castillon / (Spain) M. Caparros	2	1
(Spain) C. Goenaga / (Spain) N. Rodríguez	6	6
(Portugal) S. Araújo / (Argentina) V. Riera	3	2
(Spain) C. Mesa / (Spain) L. Martínez	6	6
(Spain) I. Domínguez / (Spain) V. Alonso	4	3
(Spain) C. Navarro / (Argentina) C. Reiter	6	6
(Spain) E. Amatriain / (Spain) P. Llaguno	6	6
(Argentina) A. Osoro / (Argentina) N. Brito	1	1
(Spain) E. Ramírez / (Spain) M. Truchado	1	2
(Spain) L. Alonso / (Spain) V. Virseda	6	6
(Spain) A. Cantin / (Spain) S. Ruiz	7	7
(Spain) A. Martinez / (Spain) M. Talavan	5	6
Bye
2	(Spain) Ariana / (Spain) Salazar

Round of 16
1	(Spain) Gemma / (Spain) L. Sainz	7	6	2
(Portugal) A.C. Nogueira / (Spain) P. Josemaría	5	7	6
(Spain) S. Hernández / (Spain) T. Icardo	4	6
(Spain) B. González / (Argentina) C. Tenorio	6	7
(Spain) M. Villalba / (Spain) T. Navarro	0	6	2
(Spain) A. Galán / (Spain) V. Iglesias	6	4	6
(Spain) A. Blanco / (Spain) B. Caldera	0	1
3	(Spain) M. Marrero / (Spain) M. Ortega	6	6
4	(Argentina) D. Brea / (Spain) Majo	6	6
(Spain) C. Goenaga / (Spain) N. Rodríguez	3	1
(Spain) C. Mesa / (Spain) L. Martínez	2	3
(Spain) C. Navarro / (Argentina) C. Reiter	6	6
(Spain) E. Amatriain / (Spain) P. Llaguno	6	6
(Spain) L. Alonso / (Spain) V. Virseda	0	3
(Spain) A. Cantin / (Spain) S. Ruiz	0	0
2	(Spain) Ariana / (Spain) Salazar	6	6

Quarter-Final
(Portugal) A.C. Nogueira / (Spain) P. Josemaría	6	6
(Spain) B. González / (Argentina) C. Tenorio	3	3
(Spain) A. Galán / (Spain) V. Iglesias
3	(Spain) M. Marrero / (Spain) M. Ortega	*
4	(Argentina) D. Brea / (Spain) Majo	6	5	6
(Spain) C. Navarro / (Argentina) C. Reiter	4	7	1
(Spain) E. Amatriain / (Spain) P. Llaguno	2	2
2	(Spain) Ariana / (Spain) Salazar	6	6

Semi-Finals
(Portugal) A.C. Nogueira / (Spain) P. Josemaría	6	2
3	(Spain) M. Marrero / (Spain) M. Ortega	7	6
4	(Argentina) D. Brea / (Spain) Majo	2	3
2	(Spain) Ariana / (Spain) Salazar	6	6

Finals
3	(Spain) M. Marrero / (Spain) M. Ortega	4	6	6
2	(Spain) Ariana / (Spain) Salazar	6	1	4

== Results ==
=== Round of 32 ===
Men's
Date	Winners	Score	Opponent	Ref.
20/3/2019	(Argentina) Maxi Sánchez (Argentina) Sanyo Gutiérrez	3–6 / 5–1 / W.O.	(Spain) Álvaro Cepero (Argentina) Sebastián Nerone	
20/3/2019	(Spain) Antonio Luque (Spain) Javier Barahona	6–3 / 6–4	(Spain) Coki Nieto (Spain) Javi Rico	
20/3/2019	(Argentina) Federico Quiles (Spain) José García Diestro	6–1 / 6–2	(Uruguay) Diego Ramos (Argentina) Juan Manuel Restivo	
20/3/2019	(Argentina) Agustin Goméz Silingo (Argentina) Adrián Allemandi	6–3 / 6–7 / 6–3	(Argentina) Franco Stupaczuk (Spain) Matías Díaz	
20/3/2019	(Spain) Javi Ruiz (Spain) Uri Botello	2–6 / 6–1 / 6–3	(Spain) José Rico (Spain) Víctor Ruiz	
20/3/2019	(Spain) Alejandro Ruiz (Spain) Martin Sánchez Piñeiro	6–3 / 7–6	(Brazil) Francisco Chico Gomes (Argentina) Germán Tamame	
20/3/2019	(Argentina) Federico Chingotto (Argentina) Juan Tello	4–6 / 6–2 / 6–1	(Spain) Gonzalo Rubio (Spain) Ernesto Moreno	
20/3/2019	(Spain) Alejandro Galán (Spain) Juani Mieres	6–3 / 7–5	(Argentina) Fernando Poggi (Argentina) Maxi Grabiel	
20/3/2019	(Spain) Juan Lebrón (Spain) Paquito Navarro	6–3 / 6–0	(Spain) Jorge Ruiz Gutiérrez (Spain) Miguel Solbes	
20/3/2019	(Spain) Nacho Gadea (Spain) Rafael Méndez	6–7 / 6–0 / 6–4	(Argentina) Juan Manuel Vazquez (Brazil) Marcello Jardim	
20/3/2019	(Argentina) Matías Nicoletti (Spain) Pedro Alonso Martínez	6–3 / 4–6 / 6–2	(Argentina) Juan Cruz Belluati (Spain) Pablo Lijó	
20/3/2019	(Argentina) Lucho Capra (Argentina) Miguel Lamperti	6–0 / 6–2	(Spain) Arturo Coello (Spain) Pincho Fernandez	
20/3/2019	(Brazil) Lucas Bergamini (Brazil) Lucas Campagnolo	6–4 / 6–1	(Argentina) Cristian Gutiérrez (Argentina) Ramiro Moyano	
20/3/2019	(Spain) Adrián Blanco (Spain) Javier Martinez Vazquez	4–6 / 7–5 / 6–3	(Argentina) Aris Patiniotis (Spain) Jordi Muñoz	
20/3/2019	(Argentina) Agustín Tapia (Spain) Juan Martín Díaz	6–4 / 6–2	(Argentina) Matías Marina (Spain) Momo González	
20/3/2019	(Argentina) Fernando Belasteguín (Brazil) Pablo Lima	6–3 / 6–4	(Spain) Aday Santana (Argentina) Godo Díaz	

Women's
Date	Winners	Score	Opponent	Ref.
20/3/2019	(Portugal) Ana Catarina Nogueira (Spain) Paula Josemaría	6–3 / 6–2	(Spain) Ainhoa Rico Martín (Spain) Irene Arzamendi	
20/3/2019	(Spain) Sandra Hernández (Spain) Tamara Icardo	6–4 / 6–4	(France) Alix Collombon (Spain) Nicole Traviesa Mola	
20/3/2019	(Spain) Beatriz González (Argentina) Catalina Tenorio	6–1 / 7–5	(Spain) Nuria Rovira (Brazil) Raquel Piltcher	
20/3/2019	(Spain) Maria Villalba (Spain) Teresa Navarro	6–1 / 6–1	(Belgium) Helena Wyckaert (Spain) María Pinacho Sánchez	
20/3/2019	(Spain) Alba Galán (Spain) Victoria Iglesias	6–4 / 6–4	(Spain) Anna Cortiles Tapia (Spain) Jessica Castelló	
20/3/2019	(Spain) Alicia Blanco Rojo (Spain) Beatriz Caldera	6–1 / 6–1	(Spain) Ana Fernández de Ossó (Spain) Sara Pujals	
20/3/2019	(Spain) Carmen Goenaga (Spain) Nuria Rodríguez	6–2 / 6–1	(Spain) Carmen Castillon (Spain) Marta Caparro	
20/3/2019	(Spain) Carla Mesa (Spain) Lucía Martínez	6–3 / 6–2	(Portugal) Sofia Araújo (Argentina) Virginia Riera	
20/3/2019	(Spain) Carolina Navarro (Argentina) Cecilia Reiter	6–4 / 6–3	(Spain) Isabel Domínguez (Spain) Vanesa Alonso	
20/3/2019	(Spain) Elisabeth Amatriain (Spain) Patricia Llaguno	6–1 / 6–1	(Argentina) Aranzazu Osoro (Argentina) Nela Brito	
20/3/2019	(Spain) Lorena Alonso (Spain) Verónica Virseda	6–1 / 6–2	(Spain) Elena Ramírez (Spain) Meli García Truchado	
20/3/2019	(Spain) Angela Caro Cantin (Spain) Sara Ruiz	7–5 / 7–6	(Spain) Araceli Martinez (Spain) Marta Talavan	

=== Round of 16 ===
Men's
Date	Winners	Score	Opponent	Ref.
21/3/2019	(Argentina) Maxi Sánchez (Argentina) Sanyo Gutiérrez	6–2 / 6–2	(Spain) Antonio Luque (Spain) Javier Barahona	
21/3/2019	(Argentina) Agustin Goméz Silingo (Argentina) Adrián Allemandi	6–3 / 6–1	(Argentina) Federico Quiles (Spain) José García Diestro	
21/3/2019	(Spain) Javi Ruiz (Spain) Uri Botello	6–2 / 6–2	(Spain) Alejandro Ruiz (Spain) Martin Sánchez Piñeiro	
21/3/2019	(Spain) Alejandro Galán (Spain) Juani Mieres	6–2 / 7–5	(Argentina) Federico Chingotto (Argentina) Juan Tello	
21/3/2019	(Spain) Juan Lebrón (Spain) Paquito Navarro	6–2 / 6–3	(Spain) Nacho Gadea (Spain) Rafael Méndez	
21/3/2019	(Argentina) Lucho Capra (Argentina) Miguel Lamperti	6–3 / 6–1	(Argentina) Matías Nicoletti (Spain) Pedro Alonso Martínez	
21/3/2019	(Brazil) Lucas Bergamini (Brazil) Lucas Campagnolo	6–4 / 6–4	(Spain) Adrián Blanco (Spain) Javier Martinez Vazquez	
21/3/2019	(Argentina) Fernando Belasteguín (Brazil) Pablo Lima	6–4 / 6–7 / 6–3	(Argentina) Agustín Tapia (Spain) Juan Martín Díaz	

Women's
Date	Winners	Score	Opponent	Ref.
21/3/2019	(Portugal) Ana Catarina Nogueira (Spain) Paula Josemaría	5–7 / 7–6 / 6–2	(Spain) Gemma Triay (Spain) Lucía Sainz	
21/3/2019	(Spain) Beatriz González (Argentina) Catalina Tenorio	6–4 / 7–6	(Spain) Sandra Hernández (Spain) Tamara Icardo	
21/3/2019	(Spain) Alba Galán (Spain) Victoria Iglesias	6–0 / 4–6 / 6–2	(Spain) Maria Villalba (Spain) Teresa Navarro	
21/3/2019	(Spain) Marta Marrero (Spain) Marta Ortega	6–0 / 6–1	(Spain) Alicia Blanco Rojo (Spain) Beatriz Caldera	
21/3/2019	(Argentina) Delfina Brea (Spain) Majo Sánchez	6–3 / 6–1	(Spain) Carmen Goenaga (Spain) Nuria Rodríguez	
21/3/2019	(Spain) Carolina Navarro (Argentina) Cecilia Reiter	6–2 / 6–3	(Spain) Carla Mesa (Spain) Lucía Martínez	
21/3/2019	(Spain) Elisabeth Amatriain (Spain) Patricia Llaguno	6–0 / 6–3	(Spain) Lorena Alonso (Spain) Verónica Virseda	
21/3/2019	(Spain) Alejandra Salazar (Spain) Ariana Sánchez	6–0 / 6–0	(Spain) Angela Caro Cantin (Spain) Sara Ruiz	

=== Quarter-Finals ===
Men's
Date	Winners	Score	Opponent	Ref.
22/3/2019	(Argentina) Maxi Sánchez (Argentina) Sanyo Gutiérrez	1–6 / 6–2 / 6–1	(Argentina) Agustin Goméz Silingo (Argentina) Adrián Allemandi	
22/3/2019	(Spain) Alejandro Galán (Spain) Juani Mieres	W.O	(Spain) Javi Ruiz (Spain) Uri Botello	
22/3/2019	(Spain) Juan Lebrón (Spain) Paquito Navarro	6–4 / 7–6	(Argentina) Lucho Capra (Argentina) Miguel Lamperti	
22/3/2019	(Argentina) Fernando Belasteguín (Brazil) Pablo Lima	6–3 / 6–3	(Brazil) Lucas Bergamini (Brazil) Lucas Campagnolo	

Women's
Date	Winners	Score	Opponent	Ref.
22/3/2019	(Portugal) Ana Catarina Nogueira (Spain) Paula Josemaría	6–3 / 6–3	(Spain) Beatriz González (Argentina) Catalina Tenorio	
22/3/2019	(Spain) Marta Marrero (Spain) Marta Ortega	W.O.	(Spain) Alba Galán (Spain) Victoria Iglesias	
22/3/2019	(Argentina) Delfina Brea (Spain) Majo Sánchez	6–4 / 5–7 / 6–1	(Spain) Carolina Navarro (Argentina) Cecilia Reiter	
22/3/2019	(Spain) Alejandra Salazar (Spain) Ariana Sánchez	6–2 / 6–2	(Spain) Elisabeth Amatriain (Spain) Patricia Llaguno	

=== Semi-Finals ===
Men's
Date	Winners	Score	Opponent	Ref.
23/3/2019	(Argentina) Maxi Sánchez (Argentina) Sanyo Gutiérrez	6–3 / 6–4	(Spain) Alejandro Galán (Spain) Juani Mieres	
23/3/2019	(Spain) Juan Lebrón (Spain) Paquito Navarro	4–6 / 7–5 / 6–1	(Argentina) Fernando Belasteguín (Brazil) Pablo Lima	

Women's
Date	Winners	Score	Opponent	Ref.
23/3/2019	(Spain) Marta Marrero (Spain) Marta Ortega	7–6 / 6–2	(Portugal) Ana Catarina Nogueira (Spain) Paula Josemaría	
23/3/2019	(Spain) Alejandra Salazar (Spain) Ariana Sánchez	6–2 / 6–3	(Argentina) Delfina Brea (Spain) Majo Sánchez	

=== Finals ===
Men's
Date	Winners	Score	Opponent	Ref.
24/3/2019	(Argentina) Maxi Sánchez (Argentina) Sanyo Gutiérrez	6–1 / 7–6	(Spain) Juan Lebrón (Spain) Paquito Navarro	

Women's
Date	Winners	Score	Opponent	Ref.
24/3/2019	(Spain) Marta Marrero (Spain) Marta Ortega	4–6 / 6–1 / 6–4	(Spain) Alejandra Salazar (Spain) Ariana Sánchez	
