= 2019 WPT Valencia Open =

World Padel Tour tournament held in Valencia, Spain

- Date: 9 – 14 July
- Edition: 12th (Note: The first sixth editions were held under the organization of the Padel Pro Tour, while the 10th and 11th we're Master's.)
- Category: Open
- Location: Valencia, Spain
- Venue: Pavelló Municipal Font de Sant Lluís

Champions
- Men's doubles: (Spain) Alejandro Galán (Brazil) Pablo Lima
- Women's doubles: (Spain) Marta Marrero (Spain) Marta Ortega

Chronology

The 2019 Valencia Open (officially 2019 World Padel Tour Estrella Damm Valencia Open) was the ninth tournament of the seventh season organized by World Padel Tour, the most prestigious padel circuit at the time.

In the women's category, the top two pairs in the FIP rankings both reached the final for the fifth time this season, entering the match with a 2–2 head-to-head record. In the final, world number ones Marta Marrero and Marta Ortega defeated Alejandra Salazar and Ariana Sánchez with ease, securing their fifth title of the season and their first as a pair in Valencia (marking a fourth win for Marrero, who had previously triumphed there in 2014, 2015, and 2016).

In the men's category, for the first time this season, a pair ranked outside the top four reached the final, with Adrián Allemandi and Agustín Goméz Silingo making their first final appearance of the season. In the championship match, Allemandi and Silingo were defeated by Alejandro Galán and Pablo Lima, who we're competing in their first tournament together. Galán and Lima had reached the final after eliminating Juan Lebrón and Paquito Navarro (the most in-form pair on the circuit at that point) in the semifinals. This victory marked their first title as a team this season (Galán's second of the year) and Galán's first win in Valencia, while for Lima, it was his fourth title there (following previous wins in 2011, 2015, and 2018).

== Head-to-head record between teams ranked in the top 4 during the season ==
=== Men's ===
Record	Maxi–Sanyo	Lebrón–Paquito	Galán–Lima	Lamperti–Mieres	Former Pairs	Díaz–Stupaczuk	Belasteguín–Lima	Galán–J. Mieres
Maxi–Sanyo	—	3–1	—	—		2–0	—	1–1
Lebrón–Paquito	1–3	—	0–1	—		2–1	5–0	2–0
Galán–Lima	—	1–0	—	—		—	—	—
Lamperti–Mieres	—	—	—	—		—	—	—
Former Pairs
Díaz–Stupaczuk	0–2	1–2	—	—		—	0–1	2–0
Belasteguín–Lima	—	0–5	—	—		1–0	—	0–1
Galán–J. Mieres	1–1	0–2	—	—		0–2	1–0	—

=== Women's ===
Record	Marrero–Ortega	Ariana–Salazar	Triay–Sainz	Delfina–Majo
Marrero–Ortega	—	3–2	3–0	2–0
Ariana–Salazar	2–3	—	2–0	4–0
Triay–Sainz	0–3	0–2	—	—
Delfina–Majo	0–2	0–4	—	—

== Draws ==
=== Men's Bracket ===
Round of 32
1	(Argentina) Maxi / (Argentina) Sanyo
Bye
(Spain) N. Gadea / (Argentina) Tapia	6	6
(Spain) J. Rico / (Spain) V. Ruiz	2	2
(Spain) A. Santana / (Argentina) M. Grabiel	6	6	6
(Argentina) F. Quiles / (Brazil) F. Gomes	3	7	4
(Spain) J. Barahona / (Spain) J. Gutiérrez	1	3
(Argentina) C. Gutiérrez / (Argentina) L. Capra	6	6
(Argentina) A. Allemandi / (Argentina) A. Silingo	6	6
(Spain) A. Blanco / (Spain) J. Martinez	4	3
(Spain) J.G. Diestro / (Argentina) J. Restivo	4	1
(Brazil) L. Bergamini / (Brazil) L. Campagnolo	6	6
(Spain) Coki / (Spain) J. Rico	5	6	2
(Argentina) Di Nenno / (Spain) J. Garrido	7	3	6
Bye
4	(Spain) J. Mieres / (Argentina) M. Lamperti
3	(Spain) Galán / (Brazil) Lima
Bye
(Spain) G. Rubio / (Spain) E. Moreno	7	7
(Spain) A. Ruiz / (Spain) M. Piñeiro	6	6
(Uruguay) D. Ramos / (Spain) R. Méndez	6	1	6
Q	(Argentina) M. Marina / (Spain) Momo	2	6	3
Q	(Argentina) D. Perino / (Brazil) M. Jardim	6	7
(Argentina) F. Stupaczuk / (Spain) M. Díaz	3	6
(Spain) J. Ruiz / (Spain) U. Botello	6	7
(Argentina) J.C. Belluati / (Argentina) R. Moyano	1	6
Q	(Argentina) C.G. Gutiérrez / (Spain) J. Morillas	2	4
(Argentina) F. Chingotto / (Argentina) J. Tello	6	6
(Spain) Á. Cepero / (Spain) P. Lijó
Q	(Spain) R. Marcos / (Spain) R. Martinez
Bye
2	(Spain) Lebrón / (Spain) Paquito

Round of 16
1	(Argentina) Maxi / (Argentina) Sanyo	3	4
(Spain) N. Gadea / (Argentina) Tapia	6	6
(Spain) A. Santana / (Argentina) M. Grabiel	6	6	2
(Argentina) C. Gutiérrez / (Argentina) L. Capra	3	7	6
(Argentina) A. Allemandi / (Argentina) A. Silingo	3	6	6
(Brazil) L. Bergamini / (Brazil) L. Campagnolo	6	3	4
(Argentina) Di Nenno / (Spain) J. Garrido	6	6
4	(Spain) J. Mieres / (Argentina) M. Lamperti	3	4
3	(Spain) Galán / (Brazil) Lima	6	6
(Spain) G. Rubio / (Spain) E. Moreno	2	4
(Uruguay) D. Ramos / (Spain) R. Méndez	6	6
Q	(Argentina) D. Perino / (Brazil) M. Jardim	3	4
(Spain) J. Ruiz / (Spain) U. Botello	4	6
(Argentina) F. Chingotto / (Argentina) J. Tello	6	7
(Spain) Á. Cepero / (Spain) P. Lijó	5	3
2	(Spain) Lebrón / (Spain) Paquito	7	6

Quarter-Final
(Spain) N. Gadea / (Argentina) Tapia	6	6
(Argentina) C. Gutiérrez / (Argentina) L. Capra	2	4
(Argentina) A. Allemandi / (Argentina) A. Silingo	6	6
(Argentina) Di Nenno / (Spain) J. Garrido	4	2
3	(Spain) Galán / (Brazil) Lima	6	6
(Uruguay) D. Ramos / (Spain) R. Méndez	3	1
(Argentina) F. Chingotto / (Argentina) J. Tello	4	6	6
2	(Spain) Lebrón / (Spain) Paquito	6	2	7

Semi-Finals
(Spain) N. Gadea / (Argentina) Tapia	2	3
(Argentina) A. Allemandi / (Argentina) A. Silingo	6	6
3	(Spain) Galán / (Brazil) Lima	1	7	6
2	(Spain) Lebrón / (Spain) Paquito	6	5	1

Finals
(Argentina) A. Allemandi / (Argentina) A. Silingo	7	5	3
3	(Spain) Galán / (Brazil) Lima	6	7	6

=== Women's Bracket ===
Round of 32
1	(Spain) M. Marrero / (Spain) M. Ortega
Bye
Q	(Spain) A. Cañellas / (Spain) J. Bautista	4	6
(Spain) C. Goenaga / (Spain) N. Rodríguez	6	7
(Spain) A. Blanco / (Spain) B. Caldera	7	1	2
(Spain) A. Martinez / (Spain) R. Aguilar	5	6	6
(Spain) A.F. de Ossó / (Spain) S. Ruiz	0	1
(Spain) B. González / (Argentina) C. Tenorio	6	6
(Spain) A. Galán / (Spain) V. Iglesias	6	6	6
(Argentina) A. Osoro / (Argentina) N. Brito	7	2	3
(Spain) E. Ramírez / (Spain) M. Talavan	1	3
(Portugal) S. Araújo / (Argentina) V. Riera	6	6
(Spain) A. Tapia / (Spain) J. Castelló	3	6	6
(Spain) A. Cantin / (Spain) S. Pujals	6	0	3
Bye
4	(Spain) E. Amatriain / (Spain) P. Llaguno
3	(Argentina) D. Brea / (Spain) Majo
Bye
Q	(Spain) A. Rico / (Spain) A. Izquierdo	2	3
(Spain) M. Villalba / (Spain) V. Virseda	6	6
Q	(Spain) E. Carnicero / (Spain) M. Merino	6	6
Q	(Spain) B. Las Heras / (France) L. Clergue	3	3
(Spain) N. Rovira / (Brazil) R. Piltcher	5	1
(Spain) C. Navarro / (Argentina) C. Reiter	7	6
(Portugal) A.C. Nogueira / (Spain) P. Josemaría	7	5	6
(Spain) S. Hernández / (Spain) T. Icardo	5	7	1
(Spain) L. Martínez / (Spain) T. Navarro	6	6
(France) A. Collombon / (Spain) N. Traviesa	4	0
LL	(Spain) M. Caparros / (Spain) M. Porras	2	0
(Spain) C. Mesa / (Spain) L. Alonso	6	6
Bye
2	(Spain) Ariana / (Spain) Salazar

Round of 16
1	(Spain) M. Marrero / (Spain) M. Ortega	*
(Spain) C. Goenaga / (Spain) N. Rodríguez
(Spain) A. Martinez / (Spain) R. Aguilar	5	1
(Spain) B. González / (Argentina) C. Tenorio	7	6
(Spain) A. Galán / (Spain) V. Iglesias	6	2	4
(Portugal) S. Araújo / (Argentina) V. Riera	2	6	6
(Spain) A. Tapia / (Spain) J. Castelló	0	1
4	(Spain) E. Amatriain / (Spain) P. Llaguno	6	6
3	(Argentina) D. Brea / (Spain) Majo	3	6	6
(Spain) M. Villalba / (Spain) V. Virseda	6	3	2
Q	(Spain) E. Carnicero / (Spain) M. Merino	1	0
(Spain) C. Navarro / (Argentina) C. Reiter	6	6
(Portugal) A.C. Nogueira / (Spain) P. Josemaría	1	6	7
(Spain) L. Martínez / (Spain) T. Navarro	6	0	5
(Spain) C. Mesa / (Spain) L. Alonso	1	4
2	(Spain) Ariana / (Spain) Salazar	6	6

Quarter-Final
1	(Spain) M. Marrero / (Spain) M. Ortega	1	6	6
(Spain) B. González / (Argentina) C. Tenorio	6	3	0
(Portugal) S. Araújo / (Argentina) V. Riera	3	3
4	(Spain) E. Amatriain / (Spain) P. Llaguno	6	6
3	(Argentina) D. Brea / (Spain) Majo	6	6
(Spain) C. Navarro / (Argentina) C. Reiter	2	2
(Portugal) A.C. Nogueira / (Spain) P. Josemaría	4	2
2	(Spain) Ariana / (Spain) Salazar	6	6

Semi-Finals
1	(Spain) M. Marrero / (Spain) M. Ortega	6	2	6
4	(Spain) E. Amatriain / (Spain) P. Llaguno	4	6	4
3	(Argentina) D. Brea / (Spain) Majo	5	3
2	(Spain) Ariana / (Spain) Salazar	7	6

Finals
1	(Spain) M. Marrero / (Spain) M. Ortega	6	6
2	(Spain) Ariana / (Spain) Salazar	3	2

== Results ==
=== Round of 32 ===
Men's
Date	Winners	Score	Opponent	Ref.
10/7/2019	(Argentina) Agustín Tapia (Spain) Nacho Gadea	6–2 / 6–2	(Spain) José Rico (Spain) Víctor Ruiz	
10/7/2019	(Spain) Aday Santana (Argentina) Maxi Grabiel	6–3 / 6–7 / 6–4	(Argentina) Federico Quiles (Spain) José García Diestro	
10/7/2019	(Argentina) Cristian Gutiérrez (Argentina) Lucho Capra	6–1 / 6–3	(Spain) Javier Barahona (Spain) Jorge Ruiz Gutiérrez	
10/7/2019	(Argentina) Agustin Goméz Silingo (Argentina) Adrián Allemandi	6–4 / 6–3	(Spain) Adrián Blanco (Spain) Javier Martinez Vazquez	
10/7/2019	(Brazil) Lucas Bergamini (Brazil) Lucas Campagnolo	6–4 / 6–1	(Spain) José García Diestro (Argentina) Juan Manuel Restivo	
10/7/2019	(Spain) Javi Garrido (Argentina) Martín Di Nenno	7–5 / 3–6 / 6–2	(Spain) Coki Nieto (Spain) Javi Rico	
10/7/2019	(Spain) Gonzalo Rubio (Spain) Ernesto Moreno	7–6 / 7–6	(Spain) Alejandro Ruiz (Spain) Martin Sánchez Piñeiro	
10/7/2019	(Uruguay) Diego Ramos (Spain) Rafael Méndez	6–2 / 1–6 / 6–3	(Argentina) Matías Marina Artusa (Spain) Momo González	
10/7/2019	(Argentina) Denis Perino (Brazil) Marcello Jardim	6–3 / 7–6	(Argentina) Franco Stupaczuk (Spain) Matías Díaz	
10/7/2019	(Spain) Javi Ruiz (Spain) Uri Botello	6–1 / 7–6	(Argentina) Juan Cruz Belluati (Argentina) Ramiro Moyano	
10/7/2019	(Argentina) Federico Chingotto (Argentina) Juan Tello	6–2 / 6–4	(Argentina) Cristian German Gutiérrez (Spain) Javier Pérez Morillas	
10/7/2019	(Spain) Álvaro Cepero (Spain) Pablo Lijó	6–7 / 6–3 / 6–2	(Spain) Raúl Marcos Durán (Spain) Ricardo Martinez	

Women's
Date	Winners	Score	Opponent	Ref.
10/7/2019	(Spain) Carmen Goenaga (Spain) Nuria Rodríguez	6–4 / 7–6	(Spain) Ariadna Cañellas (Spain) Julia Polo Bautista	
10/7/2019	(Spain) Araceli Martinez (Spain) Raquel Segura Aguilar	5–7 / 6–1 / 6–2	(Spain) Alicia Blanco Rojo (Spain) Beatriz Caldera	
10/7/2019	(Spain) Beatriz González (Argentina) Catalina Tenorio	6–0 / 6–1	(Spain) Ana Fernández de Ossó (Spain) Sara Ruiz	
10/7/2019	(Spain) Alba Galán (Spain) Victoria Iglesias	6–7 / 6–2 / 6–3	(Argentina) Aranzazu Osoro (Argentina) Nela Brito	
10/7/2019	(Portugal) Sofia Araújo (Argentina) Virginia Riera	6–1 / 6–3	(Spain) Elena Ramírez (Spain) Marta Talavan	
10/7/2019	(Spain) Anna Cortiles Tapia (Spain) Jessica Castelló	3–6 / 6–0 / 6–3	(Spain) Angela Caro Cantin (Spain) Sara Pujals	
10/7/2019	(Spain) Maria Villalba (Spain) Verónica Virseda	6–2 / 6–3	(Spain) Ainhoa Rico Martin (Spain) Alba Izquierdo	
10/7/2019	(Spain) Esther Carnicero (Spain) Melania Merino	6–3 / 6–3	(Spain) Barbara Las Heras (France) Laura Clergue	
10/7/2019	(Spain) Carolina Navarro (Argentina) Cecilia Reiter	7–5 / 6–1	(Spain) Nuria Rovira (Brazil) Raquel Piltcher	
10/7/2019	(Portugal) Ana Catarina Nogueira (Spain) Paula Josemaría	7–5 / 5–7 / 6–1	(Spain) Sandra Hernández (Spain) Tamara Icardo	
10/7/2019	(Spain) Lucía Martínez (Spain) Teresa Navarro	6–4 / 6–0	(France) Alix Collombon (Spain) Nicole Traviesa Mola	
10/7/2019	(Spain) Carla Mesa (Spain) Lorena Alonso	6–2 / 6–0	(Spain) Marta Caparros (Spain) Marta Porras Sánchez	

=== Round of 16 ===
Men's
Date	Winners	Score	Opponent	Ref.
11/7/2019	(Argentina) Agustín Tapia (Spain) Nacho Gadea	6–3 / 6–4	(Argentina) Maxi Sánchez (Argentina) Sanyo Gutiérrez	
11/7/2019	(Argentina) Cristian Gutiérrez (Argentina) Lucho Capra	3–6 / 7–6 / 6–2	(Spain) Aday Santana (Argentina) Maxi Grabiel	
11/7/2019	(Argentina) Agustin Goméz Silingo (Argentina) Adrián Allemandi	3–6 / 6–3 / 6–4	(Brazil) Lucas Bergamini (Brazil) Lucas Campagnolo	
11/7/2019	(Spain) Javi Garrido (Argentina) Martín Di Nenno	6–3 / 6–4	(Spain) Juani Mieres (Argentina) Miguel Lamperti	
11/7/2019	(Spain) Alejandro Galán (Brazil) Pablo Lima	6–2 / 6–4	(Spain) Gonzalo Rubio (Spain) Ernesto Moreno	
11/7/2019	(Uruguay) Diego Ramos (Spain) Rafael Méndez	6–3 / 6–4	(Argentina) Denis Perino (Brazil) Marcello Jardim	
11/7/2019	(Argentina) Federico Chingotto (Argentina) Juan Tello	6–4 / 7–6	(Spain) Javi Ruiz (Spain) Uri Botello	
11/7/2019	(Spain) Juan Lebrón (Spain) Paquito Navarro	7–5 / 6–3	(Spain) Álvaro Cepero (Spain) Pablo Lijó	

Women's
Date	Winners	Score	Opponent	Ref.
11/7/2019	(Spain) Marta Marrero (Spain) Marta Ortega	W.O.	(Spain) Carmen Goenaga (Spain) Nuria Rodríguez	
11/7/2019	(Spain) Beatriz González (Argentina) Catalina Tenorio	7–5 / 6–1	(Spain) Araceli Martinez (Spain) Raquel Segura Aguilar	
11/7/2019	(Portugal) Sofia Araújo (Argentina) Virginia Riera	2–6 / 6–2 / 6–4	(Spain) Alba Galán (Spain) Victoria Iglesias	
11/7/2019	(Spain) Elisabeth Amatriain (Spain) Patricia Llaguno	6–0 / 6–1	(Spain) Anna Cortiles Tapia (Spain) Jessica Castelló	
11/7/2019	(Argentina) Delfina Brea (Spain) Majo Sánchez	3–6 / 6–3 / 6–2	(Spain) Maria Villalba (Spain) Verónica Virseda	
11/7/2019	(Spain) Carolina Navarro (Argentina) Cecilia Reiter	6–1 / 6–0	(Spain) Esther Carnicero (Spain) Melania Merino	
11/7/2019	(Portugal) Ana Catarina Nogueira (Spain) Paula Josemaría	1–6 / 6–0 / 7–5	(Spain) Lucía Martínez (Spain) Teresa Navarro	
11/7/2019	(Spain) Alejandra Salazar (Spain) Ariana Sánchez	6–1 / 6–4	(Spain) Carla Mesa (Spain) Lorena Alonso	

=== Quarter-Finals ===
Men's
Date	Winners	Score	Opponent	Ref.
12/7/2019	(Argentina) Agustín Tapia (Spain) Nacho Gadea	6–2 / 6–4	(Argentina) Cristian Gutiérrez (Argentina) Lucho Capra	
12/7/2019	(Argentina) Agustin Goméz Silingo (Argentina) Adrián Allemandi	6–4 / 6–2	(Spain) Javi Garrido (Argentina) Martín Di Nenno	
12/7/2019	(Spain) Alejandro Galán (Brazil) Pablo Lima	6–3 / 6–1	(Uruguay) Diego Ramos (Spain) Rafael Méndez	
12/7/2019	(Spain) Juan Lebrón (Spain) Paquito Navarro	6–4 / 2–6 / 7–6	(Argentina) Federico Chingotto (Argentina) Juan Tello	

Women's
Date	Winners	Score	Opponent	Ref.
12/7/2019	(Spain) Marta Marrero (Spain) Marta Ortega	1–6 / 6–3 / 6–0	(Spain) Beatriz González (Argentina) Catalina Tenorio	
12/7/2019	(Spain) Elisabeth Amatriain (Spain) Patricia Llaguno	6–3 / 6–3	(Portugal) Sofia Araújo (Argentina) Virginia Riera	
12/7/2019	(Argentina) Delfina Brea (Spain) Majo Sánchez	6–2 / 6–2	(Spain) Carolina Navarro (Argentina) Cecilia Reiter	
12/7/2019	(Spain) Alejandra Salazar (Spain) Ariana Sánchez	6–4 / 6–2	(Portugal) Ana Catarina Nogueira (Spain) Paula Josemaría	

=== Semi-Finals ===
Men's
Date	Winners	Score	Opponent	Ref.
13/7/2019	(Argentina) Agustin Goméz Silingo (Argentina) Adrián Allemandi	6–2 / 6–3	(Argentina) Agustín Tapia (Spain) Nacho Gadea	
13/7/2019	(Spain) Alejandro Galán (Brazil) Pablo Lima	1–6 / 7–5 / 6–1	(Spain) Juan Lebrón (Spain) Paquito Navarro	

Women's
Date	Winners	Score	Opponent	Ref.
13/7/2019	(Spain) Marta Marrero (Spain) Marta Ortega	6–4 / 2–6 / 6–4	(Spain) Elisabeth Amatriain (Spain) Patricia Llaguno	
13/7/2019	(Spain) Alejandra Salazar (Spain) Ariana Sánchez	7–5 / 6–3	(Argentina) Delfina Brea (Spain) Majo Sánchez	

=== Finals ===
Men's
Date	Winners	Score	Opponent	Ref.
14/7/2019	(Spain) Alejandro Galán (Brazil) Pablo Lima	6–7 / 7–5 / 6–3	(Argentina) Agustin Goméz Silingo (Argentina) Adrián Allemandi	

Women's
Date	Winners	Score	Opponent	Ref.
14/7/2019	(Spain) Marta Marrero (Spain) Marta Ortega	6–3 / 6–2	(Spain) Alejandra Salazar (Spain) Ariana Sánchez	
