= 2019 WPT Valladolid Master =

World Padel Tour tournament held in Valladolid, Spain

- Date: 18 – 23 June
- Edition: 12th (Note: The first seven editions were held under the organization of the Padel Pro Tour, with this being the first as a Master event.)
- Category: Master
- Location: Valladolid, Spain
- Venue: Plaza Mayor

Champions
- Men's doubles: (Spain) Juan Lebrón (Spain) Paquito Navarro
- Women's doubles: (Spain) Alejandra Salazar (Spain) Ariana Sánchez

Chronology

The 2019 Valladolid Master (officially 2019 World Padel Tour Valladolid Master) was the seventh tournament of the seventh season organized by World Padel Tour, the most prestigious padel circuit at the time.

In the women's category, the two top-ranked pairs in the FIP rankings reached their fifth final of the year, marking their fourth head-to-head encounter. In the final, for the second consecutive (women's) tournament, the world No. 2 pair, Ariana Sánchez and Alejandra Salazar, defeated Marta Marrero and Marta Ortega in three sets. This victory secured their third title of the season and their first as a pair in Valladolid (marking a second win for Salazar, who had previously won there in 2009). Furthermore, the win brought their head-to-head record against their rivals to a 2–2 tie and leveled the number of trophies won by each pair this season, with both having claimed two Open's and one Master title's.

In the men's category, the second-ranked pair reached their sixth final of the season, to face the third-seeded team, Alejandro Galán and Juani Mieres, who had won the previous tournament in Argentina. In the final, Juan Lebrón and Paquito Navarro defeated Galán and Mieres in three sets, preventing Galán from successfully defending the title he had won the previous year. This victory marked their third title of the season and the first for both in Valladolid (Paquito's second, as he had previously won there in 2017). With this win, they also matched the world number 1 pair, Maxi Sánchez and Sanyo Gutiérrez, in terms of total trophies won this season with each pair having now claimed two Open titles and one Master title.

The Valladolid Master also made history by marking the first time that three all-Spanish pairs, along with one mixed pair (Spanish-Argentine), reached the semifinals. Besides Lebrón & Paquito and Galán & Mieres who reached the finals, with Mieres being Argentine by birth but representing Spain in international competition, Javi Ruiz & Uri Botello and Alejandro Ruiz & Martín Piñeiro also reached the penultimate day of competition.

== Head-to-head record between teams ranked in the top 4 during the season ==
=== Men's ===
Record	Maxi–Sanyo	Lebrón–Paquito	Galán–J. Mieres	Díaz–Stupaczuk	Former Pairs	Belasteguín–Lima
Maxi–Sanyo	—	3–1	1–1	2–0		—
Lebrón–Paquito	1–3	—	1–0	1–1		5–0
Galán–J. Mieres	1–1	0–1	—	0–2		1–0
Díaz–Stupaczuk	0–2	1–1	2–0	—		0–1
Former Pairs
Belasteguín–Lima	—	0–5	0–1	1–0		—

=== Women's ===
Record	Marrero–Ortega	Ariana–Salazar	Triay–Sainz	Delfina–Majo
Marrero–Ortega	—	2–2	3–0	1–0
Ariana–Salazar	2–2	—	2–0	3–0
Triay–Sainz	0–3	0–2	—	—
Delfina–Majo	0–1	0–3	—	—

== Draws ==
=== Men's Bracket ===
Round of 32
1	(Argentina) Maxi / (Argentina) Sanyo	6	6
(Spain) J. Barahona / (Spain) J. Gutiérrez	4	3
(Argentina) F. Quiles / (Spain) J.G. Diestro	7	3	5
(Spain) N. Gadea / (Spain) R. Méndez	5	6	7
(Spain) A. Ruiz / (Spain) M. Piñeiro	7	6
Q	(Spain) Coello / (Argentina) J. Vazquez	6	4
(Spain) Coki / (Spain) J. Rico	2	2
(Argentina) C. Gutiérrez / (Argentina) R. Moyano	6	6
(Argentina) F. Chingotto / (Argentina) J. Tello	6	4	7
(Argentina) A. Allemandi / (Argentina) A. Silingo	4	6	6
Q	(Argentina) A. Britos / (Spain) I. Zaratiegui	6	5
(Spain) G. Rubio / (Spain) E. Moreno	7	6
(Spain) J.C. Belluati / (Spain) P. Lijó	6	6
(Uruguay) D. Ramos / (Argentina) J. Restivo	2	3
(Argentina) G. Tamame / (Spain) M. Solbes	6	1
3	(Spain) Galán / (Spain) J. Mieres	7	6
4	(Argentina) F. Stupaczuk / (Spain) M. Díaz	6	6
(Portugal) M. Oliveira / (Spain) W. Lahoz	4	4
(Spain) J. Rico / (Spain) V. Ruiz	7	3	4
(Brazil) L. Bergamini / (Brazil) L. Campagnolo	6	6	6
Q	(Spain) R. Rivera / (Spain) T. Bueno	7	6
(Argentina) F. Poggi / (Argentina) M. Grabiel	6	4
(Spain) Á. Cepero / (Argentina) Tapia	6	3
(Spain) J. Ruiz / (Spain) U. Botello	7	6
(Argentina) L. Capra / (Argentina) M. Lamperti	6	6
(Spain) A. Blanco / (Spain) J. Martinez	3	3
(Spain) A. Santana / (Argentina) Godo Díaz	6	2	6
(Brazil) F. Gomes / (Argentina) M. Nicoletti	3	6	4
(Argentina) G. Reca / (Argentina) S. Nerone	2	2
(Argentina) Di Nenno / (Spain) J. Garrido	6	2	*
Q	(Argentina) M. Marina / (Spain) Momo	3	2
2	(Spain) Lebrón / (Spain) Paquito	6	6

Round of 16
1	(Argentina) Maxi / (Argentina) Sanyo	6	6
(Spain) N. Gadea / (Spain) R. Méndez	4	1
(Spain) A. Ruiz / (Spain) M. Piñeiro	6	7
(Argentina) C. Gutiérrez / (Argentina) R. Moyano	3	6
(Argentina) F. Chingotto / (Argentina) J. Tello	6	7
(Spain) G. Rubio / (Spain) E. Moreno	2	6
(Spain) J.C. Belluati / (Spain) P. Lijó	2	4
3	(Spain) Galán / (Spain) J. Mieres	6	6
4	(Argentina) F. Stupaczuk / (Spain) M. Díaz	6	0
(Brazil) L. Bergamini / (Brazil) L. Campagnolo	7	3	*
Q	(Spain) R. Rivera / (Spain) T. Bueno	4	4
(Spain) J. Ruiz / (Spain) U. Botello	6	6
(Argentina) L. Capra / (Argentina) M. Lamperti	6	6
(Spain) A. Santana / (Argentina) Godo Díaz	4	4
(Argentina) Di Nenno / (Spain) J. Garrido	3	2
2	(Spain) Lebrón / (Spain) Paquito	6	6

Quarter-Final
1	(Argentina) Maxi / (Argentina) Sanyo	4	4
(Spain) A. Ruiz / (Spain) M. Piñeiro	6	6
(Argentina) F. Chingotto / (Argentina) J. Tello	2	6
3	(Spain) Galán / (Spain) J. Mieres	6	7
(Brazil) L. Bergamini / (Brazil) L. Campagnolo	1	6	3
(Spain) J. Ruiz / (Spain) U. Botello	6	3	6
(Argentina) L. Capra / (Argentina) M. Lamperti	1	4
2	(Spain) Lebrón / (Spain) Paquito	6	6

Semi-Finals
(Spain) A. Ruiz / (Spain) M. Piñeiro	3	5
3	(Spain) Galán / (Spain) J. Mieres	6	7
(Spain) J. Ruiz / (Spain) U. Botello	2	3
2	(Spain) Lebrón / (Spain) Paquito	6	6

Finals
3	(Spain) Galán / (Spain) J. Mieres	7	4	4
2	(Spain) Lebrón / (Spain) Paquito	6	6	6

=== Women's Bracket ===
Round of 32
1	(Spain) M. Marrero / (Spain) M. Ortega
Bye
Q	(Spain) A. Tapia / (Spain) J. Castelló	2	2
(Spain) S. Hernández / (Spain) T. Icardo	6	6
(Spain) M. Villalba / (Spain) V. Virseda	6	6
(Spain) A.F. de Ossó / (Spain) S. Ruiz	2	4
Q	(Spain) A. Cañellas / (Spain) J. Bautista	2	1
(Spain) C. Navarro / (Argentina) C. Reiter	6	6
(Spain) E. Amatriain / (Spain) P. Llaguno	6	5	6
(Argentina) A. Osoro / (Argentina) N. Brito	3	7	4
(Spain) A. Cantin / (Spain) S. Pujals	5	2
(Venezuela) A. Seijas Cali / (Spain) M. Lobo	7	6
(France) A. Collombon / (Spain) N. Traviesa	6	7
(Spain) N. Rovira / (Brazil) R. Piltcher	4	6
Bye
4	(Argentina) D. Brea / (Spain) Majo
3	(Spain) Gemma / (Spain) L. Sainz
Bye
(Spain) E. Ramírez / (Spain) M. Talavan	6	7	7
(Portugal) S. Araújo / (Argentina) V. Riera	7	6	5
(Spain) A. Blanco / (Spain) B. Caldera	6	6
(Spain) A. Martinez / (Spain) M. Truchado	2	4
(Spain) C. Mesa / (Spain) L. Alonso	2	1
(Spain) A. Galán / (Spain) V. Iglesias	6	6
(Spain) B. González / (Argentina) C. Tenorio	7	6
(Spain) C. Goenaga / (Spain) N. Rodríguez	5	2
(Spain) L. Martínez / (Spain) T. Navarro	4	2
(Portugal) A.C. Nogueira / (Spain) P. Josemaría	6	6
(Spain) E. Carnicero / (Spain) M. Merino	6	6
(Spain) C. Perez / (Spain) R. Aguilar	1	4
Bye
2	(Spain) Ariana / (Spain) Salazar

Round of 16
1	(Spain) M. Marrero / (Spain) M. Ortega	6	6
(Spain) S. Hernández / (Spain) T. Icardo	2	3
(Spain) M. Villalba / (Spain) V. Virseda	6	3	6
(Spain) C. Navarro / (Argentina) C. Reiter	4	6	3
(Spain) E. Amatriain / (Spain) P. Llaguno	6	6
(Venezuela) A. Seijas Cali / (Spain) M. Lobo	0	1
(France) A. Collombon / (Spain) N. Traviesa	4	5
4	(Argentina) D. Brea / (Spain) Majo	6	7
3	(Spain) Gemma / (Spain) L. Sainz	6	6
(Spain) E. Ramírez / (Spain) M. Talavan	2	0
(Spain) A. Blanco / (Spain) B. Caldera	1	2
(Spain) A. Galán / (Spain) V. Iglesias	6	6
(Spain) B. González / (Argentina) C. Tenorio	5	7	4
(Portugal) A.C. Nogueira / (Spain) P. Josemaría	7	5	6
(Spain) E. Carnicero / (Spain) M. Merino	0	1
2	(Spain) Ariana / (Spain) Salazar	6	6

Quarter-Final
1	(Spain) M. Marrero / (Spain) M. Ortega	3	7	6
(Spain) M. Villalba / (Spain) V. Virseda	6	5	1
(Spain) E. Amatriain / (Spain) P. Llaguno	2	1
4	(Argentina) D. Brea / (Spain) Majo	6	2	*
3	(Spain) Gemma / (Spain) L. Sainz	6	6
(Spain) A. Galán / (Spain) V. Iglesias	3	4
(Portugal) A.C. Nogueira / (Spain) P. Josemaría	6	3	1
2	(Spain) Ariana / (Spain) Salazar	3	6	6

Semi-Finals
1	(Spain) M. Marrero / (Spain) M. Ortega	7	6
4	(Argentina) D. Brea / (Spain) Majo	6	3
3	(Spain) Gemma / (Spain) L. Sainz	4	1
2	(Spain) Ariana / (Spain) Salazar	6	6

Finals
1	(Spain) M. Marrero / (Spain) M. Ortega	7	1	4
2	(Spain) Ariana / (Spain) Salazar	5	6	6

== Results ==
=== Round of 32 ===
Men's

Date	Winners	Score	Opponent	Refs.
19/6/2019	(Argentina) Maxi Sánchez (Argentina) Sanyo Gutiérrez	6–4 / 6–3	(Spain) Javier Barahona (Spain) Jorge Ruiz Gutiérrez	
19/6/2019	(Spain) Nacho Gadea (Spain) Rafael Méndez	5–7 / 6–3 / 7–5	(Argentina) Federico Quiles (Spain) José García Diestro	
19/6/2019	(Spain) Alejandro Ruiz (Spain) Martin Sánchez Piñeiro	7–6 / 6–4	(Spain) Arturo Coello (Argentina) Juan Manuel Vazquez	
19/6/2019	(Argentina) Cristian Gutiérrez (Argentina) Ramiro Moyano	6–2 / 6–2	(Spain) Coki Nieto (Spain) Javi Rico	
19/6/2019	(Argentina) Federico Chingotto (Argentina) Juan Tello	6–4 / 4–6 / 7–6	(Argentina) Agustin Goméz Silingo (Argentina) Adrián Allemandi	
19/6/2019	(Spain) Gonzalo Rubio (Spain) Ernesto Moreno	7–5 / 6–2	(Argentina) Andrés Britos (Spain) Iñigo Zaratiegui Pedroza	
19/6/2019	(Argentina) Juan Cruz Belluati (Spain) Pablo Lijó	6–2 / 6–3	(Uruguay) Diego Ramos (Argentina) Juan Manuel Restivo	
19/6/2019	(Spain) Alejandro Galán (Spain) Juani Mieres	7–6 / 6–1	(Argentina) Germán Tamame (Spain) Miguel Solbes	
19/6/2019	(Argentina) Franco Stupaczuk (Spain) Matías Díaz	6–4 / 6–4	(Portugal) Miguel Oliveira (Spain) Willy Lahoz	
19/6/2019	(Brazil) Lucas Bergamini (Brazil) Lucas Campagnolo	6–7 / 6–3 / 6–4	(Spain) José Rico (Spain) Víctor Ruiz	
19/6/2019	(Spain) Rubén Rivera (Spain) Toni Bueno	7–6 / 6–4	(Argentina) Fernando Poggi (Argentina) Maxi Grabiel	
19/6/2019	(Spain) Javi Ruiz (Spain) Uri Botello	7–6 / 6–3	(Argentina) Agustín Tapia (Spain) Álvaro Cepero	
19/6/2019	(Argentina) Lucho Capra (Argentina) Miguel Lamperti	6–3 / 6–3	(Spain) Adrián Blanco (Spain) Javier Martinez Vazquez	
19/6/2019	(Spain) Aday Santana (Argentina) Godo Díaz	6–3 / 2–6 / 6–4	(Brazil) Francisco Gomes (Argentina) Matías Nicoletti	
19/6/2019	(Spain) Javi Garrido (Argentina) Martín Di Nenno	6–2 / 2–2 / W.O.	(Argentina) Gaby Reca (Argentina) Sebastián Nerone	
19/6/2019	(Spain) Juan Lebrón (Spain) Paquito Navarro	6–3 / 6–2	(Argentina) Matías Marina Artusa (Spain) Momo González	

Women's

Date	Winners	Score	Opponent	Refs.
19/6/2019	(Spain) Sandra Hernández (Spain) Tamara Icardo	6–2 / 6–2	(Spain) Anna Cortiles Tapia (Spain) Jessica Castelló	
19/6/2019	(Spain) Maria Villalba (Spain) Verónica Virseda	6–2 / 6–4	(Spain) Ana Fernández de Ossó (Spain) Sara Ruiz	
19/6/2019	(Spain) Carolina Navarro (Argentina) Cecilia Reiter	6–2 / 6–1	(Spain) Ariadna Cañellas (Spain) Julia Polo Bautista	
19/6/2019	(Spain) Elisabeth Amatriain (Spain) Patricia Llaguno	6–3 / 5–7 / 6–4	(Argentina) Aranzazu Osoro (Argentina) Nela Brito	
19/6/2019	(Venezuela) Ana Seijas Cali (Spain) Marina Martinez	7–5 / 6–2	(Spain) Angela Caro Cantin (Spain) Sara Pujals	
19/6/2019	(France) Alix Collombon (Spain) Nicole Traviesa Mola	6–4 / 7–6	(Spain) Nuria Rovira (Brazil) Raquel Piltcher	
19/6/2019	(Spain) Elena Ramírez (Spain) Marta Talavan	6–7 / 7–6 / 7–5	(Portugal) Sofia Araújo (Argentina) Virginia Riera	
19/6/2019	(Spain) Alicia Blanco Rojo (Spain) Beatriz Caldera	6–2 / 6–4	(Spain) Araceli Martinez (Spain) Meli García Truchado	
19/6/2019	(Spain) Alba Galán (Spain) Victoria Iglesias	6–2 / 6–1	(Spain) Carla Mesa (Spain) Lorena Alonso	
19/6/2019	(Spain) Beatriz González (Argentina) Catalina Tenorio	7–5 / 6–2	(Spain) Carmen Goenaga (Spain) Nuria Rodríguez	
19/6/2019	(Portugal) Ana Catarina Nogueira (Spain) Paula Josemaría	6–4 / 6–2	(Spain) Lucía Martínez (Spain) Teresa Navarro	
19/6/2019	(Spain) Esther Carnicero (Spain) Melania Merino	6–1 / 6–4	(Spain) Cynthia Perez (Spain) Raquel Segura Aguilar	

=== Round of 16 ===
Men's

Date	Winners	Score	Opponent	Refs.
20/6/2019	(Argentina) Maxi Sánchez (Argentina) Sanyo Gutiérrez	6–4 / 6–1	(Spain) Nacho Gadea (Spain) Rafael Méndez	
20/6/2019	(Spain) Alejandro Ruiz (Spain) Martin Sánchez Piñeiro	6–3 / 7–6	(Argentina) Cristian Gutiérrez (Argentina) Ramiro Moyano	
20/6/2019	(Argentina) Federico Chingotto (Argentina) Juan Tello	6–2 / 7–6	(Spain) Gonzalo Rubio (Spain) Ernesto Moreno	
20/6/2019	(Spain) Alejandro Galán (Spain) Juani Mieres	6–2 / 6–4	(Argentina) Juan Cruz Belluati (Spain) Pablo Lijó	
20/6/2019	(Brazil) Lucas Bergamini (Brazil) Lucas Campagnolo	7–6 / 3–0 / W.O.	(Argentina) Franco Stupaczuk (Spain) Matías Díaz	
20/6/2019	(Spain) Javi Ruiz (Spain) Uri Botello	6–4 / 6–4	(Spain) Rubén Rivera (Spain) Toni Bueno	
20/6/2019	(Argentina) Lucho Capra (Argentina) Miguel Lamperti	6–4 / 6–4	(Spain) Aday Santana (Argentina) Godo Díaz	
20/6/2019	(Spain) Juan Lebrón (Spain) Paquito Navarro	6–3 / 6–2	(Spain) Javi Garrido (Argentina) Martín Di Nenno	

Women's

Date	Winners	Score	Opponent	Refs.
20/6/2019	(Spain) Marta Marrero (Spain) Marta Ortega	6–2 / 6–3	(Spain) Sandra Hernández (Spain) Tamara Icardo	
20/6/2019	(Spain) Maria Villalba (Spain) Verónica Virseda	6–4 / 3–6 / 6–3	(Spain) Carolina Navarro (Argentina) Cecilia Reiter	
20/6/2019	(Spain) Elisabeth Amatriain (Spain) Patricia Llaguno	6–0 / 6–1	(Venezuela) Ana Seijas Cali (Spain) Marina Martinez	
20/6/2019	(Argentina) Delfina Brea (Spain) Majo Sánchez	6–4 / 7–5	(France) Alix Collombon (Spain) Nicole Traviesa Mola	
20/6/2019	(Spain) Gemma Triay (Spain) Lucía Sainz	6–2 / 6–0	(Spain) Elena Ramírez (Spain) Marta Talavan	
20/6/2019	(Spain) Alba Galán (Spain) Victoria Iglesias	6–1 / 6–2	(Spain) Alicia Blanco Rojo (Spain) Beatriz Caldera	
20/6/2019	(Portugal) Ana Catarina Nogueira (Spain) Paula Josemaría	7–5 / 5–7 / 6–4	(Spain) Beatriz González (Argentina) Catalina Tenorio	
20/6/2019	(Spain) Alejandra Salazar (Spain) Ariana Sánchez	6–0 / 6–1	(Spain) Esther Carnicero (Spain) Melania Merino	

=== Quarter-Finals ===
Men's

Date	Winners	Score	Opponent	Refs.
21/6/2019	(Spain) Alejandro Ruiz (Spain) Martin Sánchez Piñeiro	6–4 / 6–4	(Argentina) Maxi Sánchez (Argentina) Sanyo Gutiérrez	
21/6/2019	(Spain) Alejandro Galán (Spain) Juani Mieres	6–2 / 7–6	(Argentina) Federico Chingotto (Argentina) Juan Tello	
21/6/2019	(Spain) Javi Ruiz (Spain) Uri Botello	6–1 / 3–6 / 6–3	(Brazil) Lucas Bergamini (Brazil) Lucas Campagnolo	
21/6/2019	(Spain) Juan Lebrón (Spain) Paquito Navarro	6–1 / 6–4	(Argentina) Lucho Capra (Argentina) Miguel Lamperti	

Women's

Date	Winners	Score	Opponent	Refs.
21/6/2019	(Spain) Marta Marrero (Spain) Marta Ortega	3–6 / 7–5 / 6–1	(Spain) Maria Villalba (Spain) Verónica Virseda	
21/6/2019	(Argentina) Delfina Brea (Spain) Majo Sánchez	6–2 / 2–1 / W.O.	(Spain) Elisabeth Amatriain (Spain) Patricia Llaguno	
21/6/2019	(Spain) Gemma Triay (Spain) Lucía Sainz	6–3 / 6–4	(Spain) Alba Galán (Spain) Victoria Iglesias	
21/6/2019	(Spain) Alejandra Salazar (Spain) Ariana Sánchez	3–6 / 6–3 / 6–1	(Portugal) Ana Catarina Nogueira (Spain) Paula Josemaría	

=== Semi-Finals ===
Men's

Date	Winners	Score	Opponent	Refs.
22/6/2019	(Spain) Alejandro Galán (Spain) Juani Mieres	6–3 / 7–5	(Spain) Alejandro Ruiz (Spain) Martin Sánchez Piñeiro	
22/6/2019	(Spain) Juan Lebrón (Spain) Paquito Navarro	6–2 / 6–3	(Spain) Javi Ruiz (Spain) Uri Botello	

Women's

Date	Winners	Score	Opponent	Refs.
22/6/2019	(Spain) Marta Marrero (Spain) Marta Ortega	7–6 / 6–3	(Argentina) Delfina Brea (Spain) Majo Sánchez	
22/6/2019	(Spain) Alejandra Salazar (Spain) Ariana Sánchez	6–4 / 6–1	(Spain) Gemma Triay (Spain) Lucía Sainz	

=== Finals ===
Men's

Date	Winners	Score	Opponent	Refs.
23/6/2019	(Spain) Juan Lebrón (Spain) Paquito Navarro	6–7 / 6–4 / 6–4	(Spain) Alejandro Galán (Spain) Juani Mieres	

Women's

Date	Winners	Score	Opponent	Refs.
23/6/2019	(Spain) Alejandra Salazar (Spain) Ariana Sánchez	5–7 / 6–1 / 6–4	(Spain) Marta Marrero (Spain) Marta Ortega	
