= Marta Marrero =

Spanish tennis and padel player

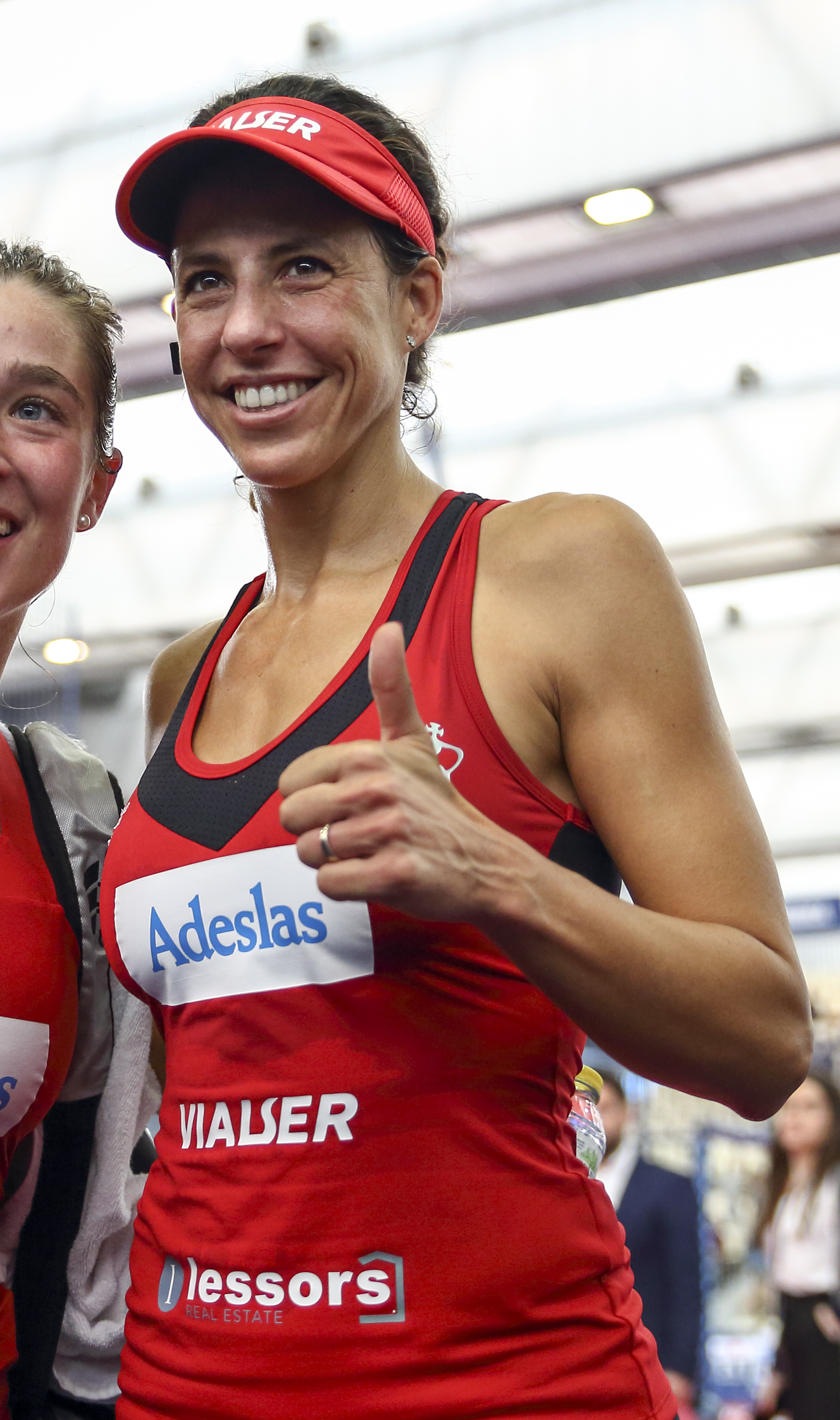
- Country (sports): Spain
- Residence: Las Palmas de Gran Canaria
- Born: 16 January 1983 (age 43) Las Palmas de Gran Canaria
- Height: 1.73 m (5 ft 8 in)
- Turned pro: 1998
- Retired: 2010
- Plays: Right-handed (two-handed backhand)
- Prize money: $901,252

Singles
- Career record: 256–191
- Career titles: 0 WTA, 9 ITF
- Highest ranking: No. 47 (18 October 2004)

Grand Slam singles results
- Australian Open: 4R (2001)
- French Open: QF (2000)
- Wimbledon: 2R (2001, 2002)
- US Open: 1R (2000–04)

Doubles
- Career record: 100–115
- Career titles: 2 WTA, 5 ITF
- Highest ranking: No. 47 (18 July 2005)

Marta Marrero (born 16 January 1983) is a Spanish professional padel player and former tennis player.

In tennis, she reached the quarterfinals of the French Open, won two WTA doubles titles, and also a total of 14 ITF singles and doubles titles. Her highest singles rank on the WTA Tour was world No. 47, which she reached in 2004. Her highest doubles ranking was No. 47, set in July 2005.

Since 2015 she is a professional padel player where she has attained a world No. 1 ranking as of 2019.

== Tennis career ==
Marrero turned professional in 1998. At the 2000 French Open, she reached the quarterfinals as a qualifier. In the second round, Marrero defeated Dominique Van Roost, who defeated No. 2 seed Lindsay Davenport in the first round. Reaching the fourth round, she defeated Paraguay's Rossana de los Ríos in three sets. It was the first time in French Open history that two qualifiers met in the fourth round. In the quarterfinals, Marrero was defeated by eventual runner-up, Conchita Martínez, 7–6, 6–1. At the 2001 French Open, she lost in the third round to Kim Clijsters, who finished runner-up.

2004 saw Marrero win first WTA Tour doubles title in Sopot, Poland. In the final, she and Nuria Llagostera Vives defeated Klaudia Jans and Alicja Rosolska. In 2005, Marrero won her second (and last) doubles title. Partnering Antonella Serra Zanetti, the team, which was seeded fourth, defeated Daniela and Sandra Klemenschits in the final.

At the 2007 US Open, Marrero competed in the doubles competition with Selima Sfar. In the first round they defeated Roberta Vinci and former world-number-one doubles player Paola Suárez, in three sets. They lost in the second round, however, to Alicia Molik and Mara Santangelo, who were the 2007 French Open doubles champions.

Marrero announced her retirement from tennis in 2010, after struggling with injuries.

== WTA Tour finals ==
=== Doubles: 5 (2 titles, 3 runner-ups) ===
Legend
Grand Slam tournaments
Tier I (0–0)
Tier II (0–0)
Tier III (2–1)
Tier IV & V (0–2)

Result	W/L	Date	Tournament	Surface	Partner	Opponents	Score
Loss	0–1	Aug 2001	Basel, Switzerland	Clay (i)	(South Africa) Joannette Kruger	(Spain) Anabel Medina Garrigues (Spain) María José Martínez Sánchez	6–7^{(5–7)}, 2–6
Win	1–1	Aug 2004	Sopot, Poland	Clay	(Spain) Nuria Llagostera Vives	(Poland) Klaudia Jans (Poland) Alicja Rosolska	6–4, 6–3
Loss	1–2	Oct 2004	Hasselt, Belgium	Hard (i)	(Spain) Nuria Llagostera Vives	(Italy) Mara Santangelo (United States) Jennifer Russell	3–6, 5–7
Win	2–2	May 2005	İstanbul, Turkey	Clay	(Italy) Antonella Serra Zanetti	(Austria) Daniela Klemenschits (Austria) Sandra Klemenschits	6–4, 6–0
Loss	2–3	Aug 2005	Budapest, Hungary	Clay	(Spain) Lourdes Domínguez Lino	(France) Émilie Loit (Slovenia) Katarina Srebotnik	1–6, 6–3, 2–6

== ITF finals ==
$100,000 tournaments
$75,000 tournaments
$50,000 tournaments
$25,000 tournaments
$10,000 tournaments

=== Singles: 18 (9–9) ===
Result	No.	Date	Tournament	Surface	Opponent	Score
Win	1.	13 September 1998	Póvoa de Varzim, Portugal	Hard	(United States) Wendy Fix	6–0, 6–0
Loss	1.	5 October 1998	Girona, Spain	Clay	(Spain) Ángeles Montolio	4–6, 1–6
Loss	2.	19 April 1999	Gelos, France	Clay	(Belgium) Stephanie Devillé	6–3, 1–6, 5–7
Loss	3.	11 July 1999	Darmstadt, Germany	Clay	(Hungary) Petra Mandula	6–1, 5–7, 1–6
Win	2.	18 July 1999	Getxo, Spain	Clay	(Spain) Lourdes Domínguez Lino	6–2, 6–7, 6–4
Win	3.	19 September 1999	Otočec, Slovenia	Clay	(Germany) Angelika Rösch	6–2, 6–1
Win	4.	26 September 1999	Sofia, Bulgaria	Clay	(Bulgaria) Lubomira Bacheva	6–2, 6–3
Win	5.	26 March 2000	Taranto, Italy	Clay	(Italy) Gloria Pizzichini	6–4, 6–4
Win	6.	23 April 2000	Gelos, France	Clay	(Spain) Anabel Medina Garrigues	2–6, 7–5, 7–5
Win	7.	16 November 2003	Le Havre, France	Clay (i)	(France) Aurélie Védy	6–3, 6–3
Loss	4.	1 December 2003	Palm Beach Gardens, US	Clay	(United States) Lindsay Lee-Waters	3–6, 3–6
Win	8.	10 October 2004	Girona	Clay	(Madagascar) Dally Randriantefy	3–6, 7–6, 6–0
Loss	5.	19 January 2007	Algiers, Algeria	Clay	(Netherlands) Michelle Gerards	7–5, 0–6, 3–6
Loss	6.	13 May 2007	Rome, Italy	Clay	(Belgium) Caroline Maes	4–6, 6–7
Loss	7.	22 September 2007	Lecce, Italy	Clay	(Russia) Alisa Kleybanova	1–6, 0–6
Loss	8.	8 October 2007	Reggio Calabria, Italy	Clay	(Bosnia and Herzegovina) Sandra Martinović	6–4, 5–7, 4–6
Loss	9.	26 April 2009	Torrent, Spain	Clay	(Spain) Lara Arruabarrena	2–6, 3–6
Win	9.	4 May 2009	Badalona, Spain	Clay	(Ukraine) Yevgeniya Kryvoruchko	6–1, 6–2

=== Doubles: 9 (5–4) ===
Result	No.	Date	Tournament	Surface	Partner	Opponents	Score
Win	1.	13 September 1998	ITF Póvoa de Varzim, Portugal	Hard	(Sweden) Aleksandra Srndovic	(Portugal) Ana Gaspar (Portugal) Frederica Piedade	6–1, 6–0
Loss	1.	11 October 1998	ITF Girona, Spain	Clay	(Spain) María José Martínez Sánchez	(Spain) Rosa María Andrés Rodríguez (Spain) Lourdes Domínguez Lino	6–4, 1–6, 6–7
Win	2.	17 April 2000	ITF Gelos, France	Clay	(Spain) Eva Bes	(Spain) Lourdes Domínguez Lino (Spain) Anabel Medina Garrigues	6–3, 6–4
Loss	2.	28 April 2007	ITF Torrent, Spain	Clay	(Spain) Carla Suárez Navarro	(Russia) Ekaterina Lopes (Russia) Evgeniya Rodina	6–7^{(7)}, 6–3, 2–6
Loss	3.	18 April 2007	ITF Gran Canaria, Spain	Clay	(Spain) Carla Suárez Navarro	(United Kingdom) Anne Keothavong (Portugal) Frederica Piedade	w/o
Win	3.	24 September 2007	ITF Granada, Spain	Clay	(Spain) María José Martínez Sánchez	(Romania) Alexandra Dulgheru (Romania) Monica Niculescu	6–4, 6–1
Win	4.	8 October 2007	ITF Reggio Calabria, Italy	Clay	(Spain) María José Martínez Sánchez	(Austria) Stefanie Haidner (Bosnia and Herzegovina) Sandra Martinović	6–1, 6–2
Loss	4.	3 February 2008	ITF Belford, France	Hard (i)	(Spain) María José Martínez Sánchez	(Czech Republic) Lucie Hradecká (Czech Republic) Andrea Hlaváčková	6–7^{(8)}, 4–6
Win	5.	15 March 2008	ITF Las Palmas, Spain	Hard	(Spain) María José Martínez Sánchez	(Greece) Anna Gerasimou (United Kingdom) Anna Hawkins	6–2, 7–6^{(1)}

== Grand Slam singles performance timeline ==
Key
W	F	SF	QF	#R	RR	Q#	DNQ	A	NH

(W) winner; (F) finalist; (SF) semifinalist; (QF) quarterfinalist; (#R) rounds 4, 3, 2, 1; (RR) round-robin stage; (Q#) qualification round; (DNQ) did not qualify; (A) absent; (NH) not held; (SR) strike rate (events won / competed); (W–L) win–loss record.

Tournament	2000	2001	2002	2003	2004	2005	2006	2007	2008	2009	W–L
Australian Open	Q1	4R	2R	2R	1R	1R	A	A	A	A	5–5
French Open	QF	3R	2R	1R	2R	1R	A	A	Q1	A	8–6
Wimbledon	Q1	2R	2R	1R	1R	1R	A	A	A		2–5
US Open	1R	1R	1R	1R	1R	1R	A	Q2	A		0–6
Win–loss	4–2	6–4	3–4	1–4	1–4	0–4	–	–	–	–	15–22
