= 2020 WPT Estrella Damm Open =

World Padel Tour tournament held in Madrid, Spain

- Date: 28 June – 5 July
- Edition: 16th (Note: The first twelve editions were held under the organization of the Padel Pro Tour, with this being the first edition without Madrid in the short name.)
- Category: Open
- Location: Madrid, Spain
- Venue: Madrid Arena

Champions
- Men's doubles: (Spain) Alejandro Galán (Spain) Juan Lebrón
- Women's doubles: (Spain) Alejandra Salazar (Spain) Ariana Sánchez

Chronology

The 2020 Estrella Damm Open (officially 2020 World Padel Tour Estrella Damm Madrid Open) was the second tournament of the eight season organized by World Padel Tour, the most prestigious padel circuit at the time, and the first since a break of almost four months due to the COVID-19 pandemic.

In the women's category, the two pairs who during the season would fight for the top spot in the rankings would reach the final. The first finalists were Gemma Triay and Lucia Sainz, who avenged their defeat in the previous tournament by eliminating the number 2 ranked pair, Marta Marrero and Paula Josemaria. Their opponents in the final were the number 1 ranked pair, Alejandra Salazar and Ariana Sánchez. In the final, Ariana and Salazar defeated Gemma and Lucia in two sets to win their first title of the season. With this victory, they also won their first title as a pair in Madrid (Ariana's first, and Salazar's third, having already won in 2007-II and 2009).

In the men's category, the two best-ranked pairs reached the final, repeating the previous tournament final. The first finalists were Pablo Lima and Paquito Navarro, who easily defeated Federico Chingotto and Juan Tello in the semi-final. Their opponents were Alejandro Galán and Juan Lebrón, who defeated the third-ranked pair, Franco Stupaczuk and Sanyo Gutiérrez, in two sets to reach the final. In the final, Galán and Lebrón defeated Lima and Paquito in two sets to win the first title of the season and their first as a team. With this victory, both Galán and Lebrón would win their first title in Madrid, the first for Galán in his hometown.

== Relevant Data ==
=== Juan Martín Díaz returns to competition 405 days later ===
After being sidelined for the entire 2017 season, Juan Martín Díaz was sidelined again for many months, specifically since May 2019, at the Jaén Open, when he was forced to withdraw after winning his opening match due to recurring knee pain. The injury would require surgery to repair a torn tendon in his right knee, the same injury he had been operated on two years earlier.

=== World Padel Tour, FIP, and FEP froze their rankings ===
Before the start of the tournament, the World Padel Tour organization decided, due to the effects caused by the COVID-19 pandemic, to freeze all ranking movements, both individual and pairs. The objective of the measure was to avoid any distortion in the rankings caused by the postponement or cancellation of several tournaments, such as Vigo, Alicante and Oviedo, as well as exhibition events in Yucatán and Stockholm. The Spanish Padel Federation (FEP) would take a very similar measure.

=== World Padel Tour Introduces Race Ranking ===
Before the start of the tournament, the WPT organization also introduced the new scoring system for the 2020 season, the "World Padel Tour Race 2020".

The "World Padel Tour Race" was a system based exclusively on the accumulation of points during the current season. Points are not compared to results from previous years, therefore no points will be deducted based on performance. There would be only two possible scenarios for the rest of the season: if at least 10 events were held, the points from all of them would be counted, excluding the two events in which each pair obtained the lowest score. If there are fewer events, only one will be deducted. The traditional ranking system would only return in 2021.

== Head-to-head record between teams ranked in the top 4 during the season ==
=== Men's ===
Record	Lima–Paquito	Galán–Lebrón	Sanyo–Stupaczuk	Díaz–Maxi
Lima–Paquito	—	1–1	—	1–0
Galán–Lebrón	1–1	—	2–0	—
Sanyo–Stupaczuk	—	0–2	—	—
Díaz–Maxi	0–1	—	—	—

=== Women's ===
Record	Ariana–Salazar	Josemaria–Marrero	Bea–Ortega	Gemma–Lucia	Former Pairs	Delfina–Nogueira
Ariana–Salazar	—	0–1	1–0	1–0		—
Josemaria–Marrero	1–0	—	—	1–1		—
Bea–Ortega	0–1	—	—	—		—
Gemma–Lucia	0–1	1–1	—	—		1–0
Former Pairs
Delfina–Nogueira	—	—	—	0–1		—

== Draws ==
=== Men's Bracket ===
Round of 32
1	(Brazil) Lima / (Spain) Paquito
Bye
(Spain) Á. Cepero / (Spain) P. Lijó	3	6	7
Q	(Argentina) F. Poggi / (Spain) M. Solbes	6	3	6
(Spain) J. Garrido / (Spain) J. Mieres	6	6
(Spain) A. Santana / (Spain) G. Rubio	4	4
(Spain) Coki / (Spain) J. Rico	6	4
6	(Spain) J. Ruiz / (Spain) U. Botello	7	6
7	(Argentina) F. Chingotto / (Argentina) J. Tello	6	6
(Argentina) L. Capra / (Argentina) R. Moyano	1	3
(Spain) E. Moreno / (Spain) J. Rico	2	3
Q	(Spain) Coello / (Spain) I. Ramírez	6	6
Q	(Spain) J. Serrano / (Spain) P.A. Martínez	1	5
(Argentina) A. Silingo / (Argentina) Di Nenno	6	7
Bye
4	(Argentina) M. Díaz / (Argentina) Maxi
3	(Argentina) Sanyo / (Argentina) Stupaczuk
Bye
(Spain) A. Blanco / (Spain) J. Martinez	3	6	4
(Spain) N. Gadea / (Argentina) S. Nerone	6	4	6
(Argentina) F. Quiles / (Argentina) J.C. Belluati	6	2	*
(Argentina) A. Gutiérrez / (Argentina) C. Gutiérrez	2	0
(Argentina) A. Allemandi / (Spain) Momo	4	6	5
5	(Argentina) Belasteguín / (Argentina) Tapia	6	3	7
8	(Brazil) L. Campagnolo / (Spain) J.M. Díaz	6	7
Q	(Spain) A. Sans / (Spain) I. Zaratiegui	3	6
(Uruguay) D. Ramos / (Argentina) R. Méndez	3	6
(Spain) A. Ruiz / (Spain) M. Piñeiro	6	7
(Brazil) L. Bergamini / (Argentina) M. Lamperti	6	4
(Spain) J.G. Diestro / (Spain) V. Ruiz	7	6
Bye
2	(Spain) Galán / (Spain) Lebrón

Round of 16
1	(Brazil) Lima / (Spain) Paquito	6	6
(Spain) Á. Cepero / (Spain) P. Lijó	3	2
(Spain) J. Garrido / (Spain) J. Mieres	6	4
6	(Spain) J. Ruiz / (Spain) U. Botello	7	6
7	(Argentina) F. Chingotto / (Argentina) J. Tello	7	6
Q	(Spain) Coello / (Spain) I. Ramírez	5	4
(Argentina) A. Silingo / (Argentina) Di Nenno	6	2	3
4	(Argentina) M. Díaz / (Argentina) Maxi	3	6	6
3	(Argentina) Sanyo / (Argentina) Stupaczuk	6	6
(Spain) N. Gadea / (Argentina) S. Nerone	3	3
(Argentina) F. Quiles / (Argentina) J.C. Belluati	3	4
5	(Argentina) Belasteguín / (Argentina) Tapia	6	6
8	(Brazil) L. Campagnolo / (Spain) J.M. Díaz	6	7
(Spain) A. Ruiz / (Spain) M. Piñeiro	4	6
(Spain) J.G. Diestro / (Spain) V. Ruiz	3	7	3
2	(Spain) Galán / (Spain) Lebrón	6	5	6

Quarter-Final
1	(Brazil) Lima / (Spain) Paquito	7	3	6
6	(Spain) J. Ruiz / (Spain) U. Botello	5	6	4
7	(Argentina) F. Chingotto / (Argentina) J. Tello	7	2	7
4	(Argentina) M. Díaz / (Argentina) Maxi	6	6	6
3	(Argentina) Sanyo / (Argentina) Stupaczuk	3	6	6
5	(Argentina) Belasteguín / (Argentina) Tapia	6	2	2
8	(Brazil) L. Campagnolo / (Spain) J.M. Díaz	3	4
2	(Spain) Galán / (Spain) Lebrón	6	6

Semi-Finals
1	(Brazil) Lima / (Spain) Paquito	6	6
7	(Argentina) F. Chingotto / (Argentina) J. Tello	3	2
3	(Argentina) Sanyo / (Argentina) Stupaczuk	3	4
2	(Spain) Galán / (Spain) Lebrón	6	6

Finals
1	(Brazil) Lima / (Spain) Paquito	5	3
2	(Spain) Galán / (Spain) Lebrón	7	6

=== Women's Bracket ===
Round of 32
1	(Spain) Ariana / (Spain) Salazar
Bye
(Spain) A. Blanco / (Argentina) C. Tenorio	3	5
(Spain) M. Villalba / (Spain) V. Virseda	6	7
Q	(Uruguay) M. Alaga / (Spain) P. Martinez	4	3
(Spain) C. Mesa / (Argentina) C. Paz	6	6
(Spain) S. Hernández / (Spain) T. Icardo	3	2
7	(Spain) C. Navarro / (Argentina) C. Reiter	6	6
5	(Spain) E. Amatriain / (Spain) P. Llaguno	6	6
(Spain) A. Tapia / (Spain) J. Castelló	0	2
(Spain) A. Cantin / (Spain) N. Rodríguez	6	7
Q	(Italy) C. Pappacena / (Italy) G. Sussarello	3	5
(Spain) E. Carnicero / (Spain) M. Merino	6	6
(Uruguay) A. De los Santos / (Spain) J. Bautista	4	4
Bye
3	(Spain) Bea González / (Spain) M. Ortega
4	(Spain) Gemma / (Spain) L. Sainz
Bye
(Spain) L. Alonso / (Brazil) R. Piltcher	2	2
(Spain) L. Rufo / (Spain) M. Talavan	6	6
(Portugal) S. Araújo / (Argentina) V. Riera	6	7
(Spain) A.F. de Ossó / (Spain) L. Martínez	1	6
(Spain) A: Martinez / (Argentina) N. Brito	6	4	2
8	(Spain) A. Galán / (Spain) V. Iglesias	4	6	6
6	(Spain) Majo / (Spain) Mapi	6	6
(France) A. Collombon / (Spain) N. Traviesa	0	0
Q	(Spain) C. Tur Mari / (Spain) M. Escandell	6	6
LL	(Spain) N. Vivancos / (Spain) S. Saiz	1	3
(Argentina) A. Osoro / (Spain) T. Navarro	6	6
(Spain) B. Caldera / (Spain) C. Goenaga	3	4
Bye
2	(Spain) M. Marrero / (Spain) P. Josemaría

Round of 16
1	(Spain) Ariana / (Spain) Salazar	6	6
(Spain) M. Villalba / (Spain) V. Virseda	3	0
(Spain) C. Mesa / (Argentina) C. Paz	3	5
7	(Spain) C. Navarro / (Argentina) C. Reiter	6	7
5	(Spain) E. Amatriain / (Spain) P. Llaguno	6	6
(Spain) A. Cantin / (Spain) N. Rodríguez	1	2
(Spain) E. Carnicero / (Spain) M. Merino	6	1	0
3	(Spain) Bea González / (Spain) M. Ortega	3	6	6
4	(Spain) Gemma / (Spain) L. Sainz	7	6
(Spain) L. Rufo / (Spain) M. Talavan	5	1
(Portugal) S. Araújo / (Argentina) V. Riera	7	7
8	(Spain) A. Galán / (Spain) V. Iglesias	5	6
6	(Spain) Majo / (Spain) Mapi	6	6
Q	(Spain) C. Tur Mari / (Spain) M. Escandell	2	0
(Argentina) A. Osoro / (Spain) T. Navarro	0	1
2	(Spain) M. Marrero / (Spain) P. Josemaría	6	6

Quarter-Final
1	(Spain) Ariana / (Spain) Salazar	6	6
7	(Spain) C. Navarro / (Argentina) C. Reiter	1	3
5	(Spain) E. Amatriain / (Spain) P. Llaguno	6	6
3	(Spain) Bea González / (Spain) M. Ortega	4	2
4	(Spain) Gemma / (Spain) L. Sainz	6	6
(Portugal) S. Araújo / (Argentina) V. Riera	3	3
6	(Spain) Majo / (Spain) Mapi	4	2
2	(Spain) M. Marrero / (Spain) P. Josemaría	6	6

Semi-Finals
1	(Spain) Ariana / (Spain) Salazar	6	6
5	(Spain) E. Amatriain / (Spain) P. Llaguno	4	4
4	(Spain) Gemma / (Spain) L. Sainz	6	6
2	(Spain) M. Marrero / (Spain) P. Josemaría	2	3

Finals
1	(Spain) Ariana / (Spain) Salazar	6	6
4	(Spain) Gemma / (Spain) L. Sainz	2	3

== Results ==
=== Round of 32 ===
Men's
Date	Winners	Score	Opponent	Ref.
1/7/2020	(Spain) Álvaro Cepero (Spain) Pablo Lijó	3–6 / 6–3 / 7–6	(Argentina) Fernando Poggi (Spain) Miguel Solbes	
1/7/2020	(Spain) Javi Garrido (Spain) Juani Mieres	6–4 / 6–4	(Spain) Aday Santana (Spain) Gonzalo Rubio	
1/7/2020	(Spain) Javi Ruiz (Spain) Uri Botello	7–6 / 6–4	(Spain) Coki Nieto (Spain) Javi Rico	
1/7/2020	(Argentina) Federico Chingotto (Argentina) Juan Tello	6–1 / 6–3	(Argentina) Lucho Capra (Argentina) Ramiro Moyano	
1/7/2020	(Spain) Arturo Coello (Spain) Iván Ramírez	6–2 / 6–3	(Spain) Ernesto Moreno (Spain) José Rico	
1/7/2020	(Argentina) Agustin Gomez Silingo (Argentina) Martín Di Nenno	6–1 / 7–5	(Spain) José Sánchez Serrano (Spain) Pedro Alonso Martínez	
1/7/2020	(Spain) Nacho Gadea (Argentina) Sebastián Nerone	6–3 / 4–6 / 6–4	(Spain) Adrián Blanco (Spain) Javier Martinez Vazquez	
1/7/2020	(Argentina) Federico Quiles (Argentina) Juan Cruz Belluati	6–1 / 2–0 / W.O.	(Argentina) Agustin Gutiérrez (Argentina) Cristian Gutiérrez	
1/7/2020	(Argentina) Agustín Tapia (Argentina) Fernando Belasteguín	6–4 / 3–6 / 7–5	(Argentina) Adrián Allemandi (Spain) Momo González	
1/7/2020	(Spain) Juan Martín Díaz (Brazil) Lucas Campagnolo	6–3 / 7–6	(Spain) Anton Sans (Spain) Iñigo Zaratiegui	
1/7/2020	(Spain) Alejandro Ruiz (Spain) Martin Sánchez Piñeiro	6–3 / 7–6	(Uruguay) Diego Ramos (Spain) Rafael Méndez	
1/7/2020	(Spain) José García Diestro (Spain) Victor Ruiz	7–6 / 6–4	(Brazil) Lucas Bergamini (Argentina) Miguel Lamperti	

Women's
Date	Winners	Score	Opponent	Ref.
1/7/2020	(Spain) Maria Villalba (Spain) Verónica Virseda	6–3 / 7–5	(Spain) Alicia Blanco Rojo (Argentina) Catalina Tenorio	
1/7/2020	(Spain) Carla Mesa (Argentina) Celeste Paz	6–4 / 6–3	(Uruguay) Manuela Alaga (Spain) Patricia Martinez	
1/7/2020	(Spain) Carolina Navarro (Argentina) Cecilia Reiter	6–3 / 6–2	(Spain) Sandra Hernández (Spain) Tamara Icardo	
1/7/2020	(Spain) Elisabeth Amatriain (Spain) Patricia Llaguno	6–0 / 6–2	(Spain) Anna Cortiles Tapia (Spain) Jessica Castelló	
1/7/2020	(Spain) Angela Caro Cantin (Spain) Nuria Rodríguez	6–3 / 7–5	(Italy) Chiara Pappacena (Italy) Giulia Sussarello	
1/7/2020	(Spain) Esther Carnicero (Spain) Melania Merino	6–4 / 6–4	(Uruguay) Andreína De los Santos (Spain) Julia Polo Bautista	
1/7/2020	(Spain) Lorena Rufo (Spain) Marta Talavan	6–2 / 6–2	(Spain) Lorena Alonso (Brazil) Raquel Piltcher	
1/7/2020	(Portugal) Sofia Araújo (Argentina) Virginia Riera	6–1 / 7–6	(Spain) Ana Fernández de Ossó (Spain) Lucía Martínez	
1/7/2020	(Spain) Alba Galán (Spain) Victoria Iglesias	4–6 / 6–4 / 6–2	(Spain) Araceli Martinez (Argentina) Nela Brito	
1/7/2020	(Spain) Majo Sánchez (Spain) Mapi Sánchez	6–0 / 6–0	(France) Alix Collombon (Spain) Nicole Traviesa Mola	
1/7/2020	(Spain) Carla Tur Mari (Spain) Maria Del Pilar Escandell	6–1 / 6–3	(Spain) Nuria Vivancos (Spain) Sofía Saiz	
1/7/2020	(Argentina) Aranzazu Osoro (Spain) Teresa Navarro	6–3 / 6–4	(Spain) Beatriz Caldera (Spain) Carmen Goenaga	

=== Round of 16 ===
Men's
Date	Winners	Score	Opponent	Ref.
2/7/2020	(Brazil) Pablo Lima (Spain) Paquito Navarro	6–3 / 6–2	(Spain) Álvaro Cepero (Spain) Pablo Lijó	
2/7/2020	(Spain) Javi Ruiz (Spain) Uri Botello	7–6 / 6–4	(Spain) Javi Garrido (Spain) Juani Mieres	
2/7/2020	(Argentina) Federico Chingotto (Argentina) Juan Tello	7–5 / 6–4	(Spain) Arturo Coello (Spain) Iván Ramírez	
2/7/2020	(Spain) Matías Díaz (Argentina) Maxi Sánchez	3–6 / 6–2 / 6–3	(Argentina) Agustin Gomez Silingo (Argentina) Martín Di Nenno	
2/7/2020	(Argentina) Franco Stupaczuk (Argentina) Sanyo Gutiérrez	6–3 / 6–3	(Spain) Nacho Gadea (Argentina) Sebastián Nerone	
2/7/2020	(Argentina) Agustín Tapia (Argentina) Fernando Belasteguín	6–3 / 6–4	(Argentina) Federico Quiles (Argentina) Juan Cruz Belluati	
2/7/2020	(Spain) Juan Martín Díaz (Brazil) Lucas Campagnolo	6–4 / 7–6	(Spain) Alejandro Ruiz (Spain) Martin Sánchez Piñeiro	
2/7/2020	(Spain) Alejandro Galán (Spain) Juan Lebrón	6–3 / 5–7 / 6–3	(Spain) José García Diestro (Spain) Victor Ruiz	

Women's
Date	Winners	Score	Opponent	Ref.
2/7/2020	(Spain) Alejandra Salazar (Spain) Ariana Sánchez	6–3 / 6–0	(Spain) Maria Villalba (Spain) Verónica Virseda	
2/7/2020	(Spain) Carolina Navarro (Argentina) Cecilia Reiter	6–3 / 7–5	(Spain) Carla Mesa (Argentina) Celeste Paz	
2/7/2020	(Spain) Elisabeth Amatriain (Spain) Patricia Llaguno	6–1 / 6–2	(Spain) Angela Caro Cantin (Spain) Nuria Rodríguez	
2/7/2020	(Spain) Bea González (Spain) Marta Ortega	3–6 / 6–1 / 6–0	(Spain) Esther Carnicero (Spain) Melania Merino	
2/7/2020	(Spain) Gemma Triay (Spain) Lucia Sainz	7–5 / 6–1	(Spain) Lorena Rufo (Spain) Marta Talavan	
2/7/2020	(Portugal) Sofia Araújo (Argentina) Virginia Riera	7–5 / 7–6	(Spain) Alba Galán (Spain) Victoria Iglesias	
2/7/2020	(Spain) Majo Sánchez (Spain) Mapi Sánchez	6–2 / 6–0	(Spain) Carla Tur Mari (Spain) Maria Del Pilar Escandell	
2/7/2020	(Spain) Marta Marrero (Spain) Paula Josemaría	6–0 / 6–1	(Argentina) Aranzazu Osoro (Spain) Teresa Navarro	

=== Quarter-Finals ===
Men's
Date	Winners	Score	Opponent	Ref.
3/7/2020	(Brazil) Pablo Lima (Spain) Paquito Navarro	7–5 / 3–6 / 6–4	(Spain) Javi Ruiz (Spain) Uri Botello	
3/7/2020	(Argentina) Federico Chingotto (Argentina) Juan Tello	7–6 / 2–6 / 7–6	(Spain) Matías Díaz (Argentina) Maxi Sánchez	
3/7/2020	(Argentina) Franco Stupaczuk (Argentina) Sanyo Gutiérrez	3–6 / 6–2 / 6–2	(Argentina) Agustín Tapia (Argentina) Fernando Belasteguín	
3/7/2020	(Spain) Alejandro Galán (Spain) Juan Lebrón	6–3 / 6–4	(Spain) Juan Martín Díaz (Brazil) Lucas Campagnolo	

Women's
Date	Winners	Score	Opponent	Ref.
3/7/2020	(Spain) Alejandra Salazar (Spain) Ariana Sánchez	6–1 / 6–3	(Spain) Carolina Navarro (Argentina) Cecilia Reiter	
3/7/2020	(Spain) Elisabeth Amatriain (Spain) Patricia Llaguno	6–4 / 6–2	(Spain) Bea González (Spain) Marta Ortega	
3/7/2020	(Spain) Gemma Triay (Spain) Lucia Sainz	6–3 / 6–3	(Portugal) Sofia Araújo (Argentina) Virginia Riera	
3/7/2020	(Spain) Marta Marrero (Spain) Paula Josemaría	6–4 / 6–2	(Spain) Majo Sánchez (Spain) Mapi Sánchez	

=== Semi-Finals ===
Men's
Date	Winners	Score	Opponent	Ref.
4/7/2020	(Brazil) Pablo Lima (Spain) Paquito Navarro	6–3 / 6–2	(Argentina) Federico Chingotto (Argentina) Juan Tello	
4/7/2020	(Spain) Alejandro Galán (Spain) Juan Lebrón	6–3 / 6–4	(Argentina) Franco Stupaczuk (Argentina) Sanyo Gutiérrez	

Women's
Date	Winners	Score	Opponent	Ref.
4/7/2020	(Spain) Alejandra Salazar (Spain) Ariana Sánchez	6–4 / 6–4	(Spain) Elisabeth Amatriain (Spain) Patricia Llaguno	
4/7/2020	(Spain) Gemma Triay (Spain) Lucia Sainz	6–2 / 6–3	(Spain) Marta Marrero (Spain) Paula Josemaría	

=== Finals ===
Men's
Date	Winners	Score	Opponent	Ref.
5/7/2020	(Spain) Alejandro Galán (Spain) Juan Lebrón	7–5 / 6–3	(Brazil) Pablo Lima (Spain) Paquito Navarro	

Women's
Date	Winners	Score	Opponent	Ref.
5/7/2020	(Spain) Alejandra Salazar (Spain) Ariana Sánchez	6–2 / 6–3	(Spain) Gemma Triay (Spain) Lucia Sainz	
