= 2022 NewGiza P1 =

Padel championships

- Date: 24 – 30 October
- Edition: 1st
- Category: P1
- Prize money: € 250,000
- Location: Giza, Egypt
- Venue: Newgiza Sports Club

Champions
- Men's doubles: (Argentina) Franco Stupaczuk (Brazil) Pablo Lima

Chronology
Previous
Menorca Open (WPT)
Next
Malmö Open (WPT)

The 2022 NewGiza P1 was the sixth tournament of the season organized by Premier Padel, promoted by the International Padel Federation, and with the financial backing of Nasser Al-Khelaïfi's Qatar Sports Investments.

Franco Stupaczuk and Pablo Lima, FIP number 3 ranked team, defeated Alejandro Galán and Juan Lebrón, FIP number 1 ranked team, in the final, winning their second consecutive title in the circuit.

== Seeds ==
1. (Spain) Alejandro Galán / (Spain) Juan Lebrón (final)
2. (Argentina) Juan Tello / (Spain) Paquito Navarro (second round)
3. (Argentina) Franco Stupaczuk / (Brazil) Pablo Lima (winners)
4. (Spain) Arturo Coello / (Argentina) Fernando Belasteguín (semi-finals)
5. (Spain) Coki Nieto / (Argentina) Martin Di Nenno (second round)
6. (Spain) Aléx Ruiz / (Spain) Jerónimo González (quarter-finals)
7. (Argentina) Federico Chingotto / (Spain) Javier Garrido (round of 16)
8. (Argentina) Lucho Capra/ (Argentina) Maxi Sanchéz (round of 16)

== Results ==
Round of 32
1	(Spain) Galán/ (Spain) Lebrón	6	6
(Spain) D. Perino / (Spain) S. Alba	4	0
(Spain) A. Bassas/ (Spain) P. Vera	3	1
8	(Spain) J.G. Diestro / (Spain) P. Fernandéz	6	6
14	(Spain) J. Sanz / (Argentina) R. Moyano	6	6
(Spain) A. Melendez / (Argentina) F. Domínguez	4	4
(Argentina) A. Chozas / (Argentina) V. Libaak	3	6
7	(Argentina) Chingotto / (Spain) J. Garrido	6	7
5	(Spain) Coki / (Argentina) Di Nenno	6	3
(Spain) E. Chamero / (Spain) I. Jofre	1	6	*
(Spain) A. Marques / (Spain) L. Carballo	3	4
10	(Argentina) Lamperti / (Spain) Yanguas	6	6
12	(Spain) J. Ruiz / (Spain) P. Lijó	4	1
(Sweden) D. Windahl / (Spain) J. Marmolejo	6	6
(Spain) A. Sans / (Spain) T. Zapata	4	3
4	(Argentina) Belasteguín / (Spain) Coello	6	6
3	(Argentina) F. Stupaczuk / (Brazil) Lima	6	6
(Argentina) A. Patiniotis / (Spain) I. Ramirez	2	4
(Spain) J.M. Vazquez / (France) J. Scatena	1	1
11	(Spain) J. Leal / (Spain) J. Rico	6	6
13	(Spain) A. Arroyo / (Spain) G. Rubio	6	6	6
(Spain) J. Batista / (Spain) M. Huete	1	7	2
(Spain) J. Fermosell / (Spain) M. Solbes	3	3
6	(Spain) A. Ruíz / (Spain) Momo	6	6
8	(Argentina) Capra / (Argentina) Maxi	6	6
(Spain) A. Cépero / (Spain) R. Méndez	4	3
(Spain) J. Serrano / (Spain) P. Cardona	4	3
16	(Brazil) L. Bergamini / (Spain) V. Ruiz	6	6
9	(Argentina) A. Silingo / (Argentina) J.C. Belluati	6	7	3
(Spain) J.G. Barahona / (Spain) J.G. Mora	7	6	6
(Spain) E. Goenaga / (Spain) J. Bautista'	6	6
2	(Argentina) J. Tello / (Spain) Paquito	2	3

Round of 16
1	(Spain) Galán / (Spain) Lebrón	6	*
8	(Spain) J.G. Diestro / (Spain) P. Fernandéz	2
14	(Spain) J. Sanz / (Argentina) R. Moyano	7	3	6
7	(Argentina) Chingotto / (Spain) J. Garrido	6	6	3
(Spain) E. Chamero / (Spain) I. Jofre	4	3
10	(Argentina) M. Lamperti / (Spain) Yanguas	6	6
(Sweden) D. Windahl / (Spain) J. Marmolejo	2	4
6	(Argentina) Belasteguín / (Spain) Coello	6	6
3	(Argentina) F. Stupaczuk / (Brazil) Lima	6	6
11	(Spain) J. Leal / (Spain) J. Rico	2	4
13	(Spain) A. Arroyo / (Spain) G. Rubio	2	3
6	(Spain) A. Ruíz / (Spain) Momo	6	6
8	(Argentina) L. Capra / (Argentina) Maxi	6	5	3
16	(Brazil) L. Bergamini / (Spain) V. Ruiz	4	7	6
(Spain) J.G. Barahona / (Spain) J.G. Mora	3	7	4
(Spain) E. Goenaga / (Spain) J. Bautista	6	5	6

Quarterfinals
1	(Spain) Galán / (Spain) Lebrón	6	6
14	(Spain) J. Sanz / (Argentina) R. Moyano	3	2
10	(Argentina) M. Lamperti / (Spain) Yanguas	0	5
4	(Spain) Coello / (Argentina) Belasteguín	6	7
3	(Argentina) F. Stupaczuk / (Brazil) Lima	3	6	7
6	(Spain) A. Ruíz / (Spain) Momo	6	2	5
16	(Brazil) L. Bergamini / (Spain) V. Ruiz	3	6	6
(Spain) E. Goenaga / (Spain) J. Bautista	6	2	2

Semifinals
1	(Spain) Galán / (Spain) Lebrón	6	7	6
4	(Argentina) Belasteguín / (Spain) Coello	7	6	2
3	(Argentina) F. Stupaczuk / (Brazil) Lima	7	6
16	(Brazil) L. Bergamini / (Spain) V. Ruiz	6	3

Final
1	(Spain) Galán/ (Spain) Lebrón	6	6	6
3	(Argentina) F. Stupaczuk / (Brazil) Lima	2	7	7

=== First Round ===
Date	Winners	Score	Opponent	Refs.
25/10/2022	(Argentina) Denis Perino (Spain) Sergio Alba	7–5 / 6–1	(Spain) Francisco Guerrero (Spain) Jaime Menendez Gil	
25/10/2022	(Spain) Aitor Bassas (Spain) Pedro Vera	6–4 / 6–3	(Spain) Marc Quilez (Spain) Toni Bueno	
25/10/2022	(Spain) Alvaro Melendez (Argentina) Facundo Domínguez	5–7 / 6–4 / 6–4	(Spain) Mario Ortega (Spain) Carlos Matri Vaño	
25/10/2022	(Spain) Javier Navarro Perez (Spain) Ricardo Sanchez	6–4 / 6–2	(France) Benjamin Tison (France) Johan Bergeron	
25/10/2022	(Spain) Emilio Sanchez Chamero (Spain) Iñigo Jofre	7–6 / 6–1	(Spain) Antonio Luque (Spain) Sergio Icardo	
25/10/2022	(Spain) Adrian Marques (Spain) Luis Pozo Carballo	6–4 / 7–5	(Chile) Javier Valdes (Spain) Jesus Moya	
25/10/2022	(Sweden) Daniel Windahl (Spain) Jose Solano Marmolejo	W.O.	(Spain) Mario Del Castillo (Spain) Miguel Benítez	
25/10/2022	(Spain) Anton Sans (Spain) Teodoro Zapata	6–0 / 6–0	(Egypt) K. Nagy (Egypt) S. Abou Senna	
25/10/2022	(Argentina) Aris Patiniotis (Spain) Ivan Ramirez	6–3 / 6–4	(Qatar) Mohammed Saadon (Spain) Salvador Oria	
25/10/2022	(France) Jeremy Scatena (Spain) Javier Martinez Vazquez	4–6 / 6–3 / 6–4	(Spain) Fran Ramirez (Argentina) Ignacio Sager	
25/10/2022	(Spain) Diego Gil Batista (Spain) Mario Huete	6–4 / 6–0	(Egypt) Aly Zaghloul (Egypt) Georges Wakim	
25/10/2022	(Spain) Jaime Fermosell (Spain) Miguel Solbes	6–1 / 6–0	(Egypt) Ahmed Mostafa Nazir (Egypt) Tamer Hanna	
25/10/2022	(Spain) Alvaro Cépero (Spain) Rafael Méndez	6–3 / 7–6	(Spain) Miguel Semmler (Spain) Jorge Ruiz Gutierrez	
25/10/2022	(Spain) Jose Sanchez Serrano (Spain) Pablo Cardona	6–2 / 6–1	(Egypt) Ahmed Alaa Marzouk (Egypt) Youssef Hossam	
25/10/2022	(Spain) Javier Gonzalez Barahona (Spain) Javier García Mora	6–1 / 6–3	(Spain) Ignacio Vilariño (Spain) Jaime Muñoz	
25/10/2022	(Spain) Enrique Goenaga (Spain) Jairo Bautista	6–1 / 4–6 / 6–4	(Spain) Aday Santana (Argentina) Nicolás Suescun	

=== Round of 32 ===
Date	Winners	Score	Opponent	Refs.
26/10/2022	(Spain) Alejandro Galán (Spain) Juan Lebrón	6–4 / 6–0	(Argentina) Denis Perino (Spain) Sergio Alba	
26/10/2022	(Spain) José García Diestro (Spain) Pincho Fernandez	6–3 / 6–2	(Spain) Aitor Bassas (Spain) Pedro Vera	
26/10/2022	(Spain) Jon Sanz (Argentina) Ramiro Moyano	6–4 / 6–4	(Spain) Alvaro Melendez (Argentina) Facundo Domínguez	
26/10/2022	(Argentina) Federico Chingotto (Spain) Javi Garrido	6–3 / 7–6	(Spain) Javier Navarro Perez (Spain) Ricardo Sanchez	
26/10/2022	(Spain) Emilio Sanchez Chamero (Spain) Iñigo Jofre	1–6 / 6–3 / W.O.	(Spain) Coki Nieto (Argentina) Martin Di Nenno	
26/10/2022	(Argentina) Miguel Lamperti (Spain) Miguel Yanguas	6–3 / 6–4	(Spain) Adrian Marques (Spain) Luis Pozo Carballo	
26/10/2022	(Sweden) Daniel Windahl (Spain) Jose Solano Marmolejo	6–4 / 6–1	(Spain) Javi Ruiz (Spain) Pablo Lijó	
26/10/2022	(Spain) Arturo Coello (Argentina) Fernando Belasteguín	6–4 / 6–3	(Spain) Anton Sans (Spain) Teodoro Zapata	
26/10/2022	(Argentina) Franco Stupaczuk (Brazil) Pablo Lima	6–2 / 6–4	(Argentina) Aris Patiniotis (Spain) Ivan Ramirez	
26/10/2022	(Spain) Javier Leal (Spain) Javier Rico	6–1 / 6–1	(France) Jeremy Scatena (Spain) Javier Martinez Vazquez	
26/10/2022	(Spain) Alex Arroyo (Spain) Gonzalo Rubio	6–1 / 6–7 / 6–2	(Spain) Diego Gil Batista (Spain) Mario Huete	
26/10/2022	(Spain) Alex Ruiz (Spain) Momo Gonzalez	6–3 / 6–3	(Spain) Jaime Fermosell (Spain) Miguel Solbes	
26/10/2022	(Argentina) Lucho Capra (Argentina) Maxi Sánchez	6–4 / 6–3	(Spain) Alvaro Cépero (Spain) Rafael Méndez	
26/10/2022	(Brazil) Lucas Bergamini (Spain) Víctor Ruiz	6–4 / 6–3	(Spain) Jose Sanchez Serrano (Spain) Pablo Cardona	
26/10/2022	(Spain) Javier Gonzalez Barahona (Spain) Javier García Mora	7–6 / 6–7 / 6–3	(Argentina) Agustin Gomez Silingo (Argentina) Juan Cruz Belluati	
26/10/2022	(Spain) Enrique Goenaga (Spain) Jairo Bautista	6–2 / 6–3	(Argentina) Juan Ignacio Tello (Spain) Paquito Navarro	

=== Round of 16 ===
Date	Winners	Score	Opponent	Refs.
27/10/2022	(Spain) Alejandro Galán (Spain) Juan Lebrón	6–2 / W.O.	(Spain) José García Diestro (Spain) Pincho Fernandez	
27/10/2022	(Spain) Jon Sanz (Argentina) Ramiro Moyano	7–6 / 3–6 / 6–3	(Argentina) Federico Chingotto (Spain) Javi Garrido	
27/10/2022	(Argentina) Miguel Lamperti (Spain) Miguel Yanguas	6–4 / 6–3	(Spain) Emilio Sanchez Chamero (Spain) Iñigo Jofre	
27/10/2022	(Spain) Arturo Coello (Argentina) Fernando Belasteguín	6–2 / 6–4	(Sweden) Daniel Windahl (Spain) Jose Solano Marmolejo	
27/10/2022	(Argentina) Franco Stupaczuk (Brazil) Pablo Lima	6–2 / 6–4	(Spain) Javier Leal (Spain) Javier Rico	
27/10/2022	(Spain) Alex Ruiz (Spain) Momo Gonzalez	6–2 / 6–3	(Spain) Alex Arroyo (Spain) Gonzalo Rubio	
27/10/2022	(Brazil) Lucas Bergamini (Spain) Víctor Ruiz	4–6 / 7–5 / 6–3	(Argentina) Lucho Capra (Argentina) Maxi Sánchez	
27/10/2022	(Spain) Enrique Goenaga (Spain) Jairo Bautista	6–3 / 5–7 / 6–4	(Spain) Javier Gonzalez Barahona (Spain) Javier García Mora	

=== Quarter-Finals ===
Date	Winners	Score	Opponent	Refs.
28/10/2022	(Spain) Alejandro Galán (Spain) Juan Lebrón	6–3 / 6–2	(Spain) Jon Sanz (Argentina) Ramiro Moyano	
28/10/2022	(Spain) Arturo Coello (Argentina) Fernando Belasteguín	6–0 / 7–5	(Argentina) Miguel Lamperti (Spain) Miguel Yanguas	
28/10/2022	(Argentina) Franco Stupaczuk (Brazil) Pablo Lima	3–6 / 6–2 / 7–5	(Spain) Alex Ruiz (Spain) Momo Gonzalez	
28/10/2022	(Brazil) Lucas Bergamini (Spain) Víctor Ruiz	3–6 / 6–2 / 6–2	(Spain) Enrique Goenaga (Spain) Jairo Bautista	

=== Semi-Finals ===
Date	Winners	Score	Opponent	Refs.
29/10/2022	(Spain) Alejandro Galán (Spain) Juan Lebrón	6–7 / 7–6 / 6–2	(Spain) Arturo Coello (Argentina) Fernando Belasteguín	
29/10/2022	(Argentina) Franco Stupaczuk (Brazil) Pablo Lima	6–4 / 6–0	(Brazil) Lucas Bergamini (Spain) Víctor Ruiz	

=== Finals ===
Date	Winners	Score	Opponent	Refs.
30/10/2022	(Argentina) Franco Stupaczuk (Brazil) Pablo Lima	2–6 / 7–6 / 7–6	(Spain) Alejandro Galán (Spain) Juan Lebrón	

== Points distribution ==
Below is a series of tables showing the ranking points and money a player can earn.

Event	First round	Second Round	Round of 16	QF	SF	F	W
Points	18	45	90	180	300	600	1000
