= 2022 Argentina P1 =

Padel championships

- Date: 8 – 14 August
- Edition: 1st
- Category: P1
- Prize money: € 250,000
- Location: Mendoza, Argentina
- Venue: Aconcagua Arena

Champions
- Men's doubles: (Argentina) Franco Stupaczuk (Brazil) Pablo Lima

Chronology
Previous
Madrid P1
Next
Portugal Open (WPT)

The 2022 Argentina P1 was the fifth tournament of the season organized by Premier Padel, promoted by the International Padel Federation, and with the financial backing of Nasser Al-Khelaïfi's Qatar Sports Investments.

Franco Stupaczuk and Pablo Lima, FIP number 4 ranked team, defeated Arturo Coello and Fernando Belasteguín, FIP number 6 ranked team, in the final, winning their first title in the circuit.

== Seeds ==
1. (Spain) Alejandro Galán / (Spain) Juan Lebrón (semi-finals)
2. (Argentina) Martin Di Nenno / (Spain) Paquito Navarro (semi-finals)
3. (Argentina) Agustín Tapia / (Argentina) Sanyo Gutiérrez (quarter-finals)
4. (Argentina) Franco Stupaczuk / (Brazil) Pablo Lima (winners)
5. (Argentina) Federico Chingotto / (Argentina) Juan Tello (quarter-finals)
6. (Spain) Arturo Coello / (Argentina) Fernando Belasteguín (final)
7. (Spain) Aléx Ruiz / (Spain) Jerónimo González (quarter-finals)
8. (Argentina) Lucho Capra/ (Argentina) Maxi Sanchéz (round of 16)

== Results ==
Round of 32
1	(Spain) Galán / (Spain) Lebrón	6	6
(Spain) A. Ayats / (Argentina) D. Perino	2	4
(Argentina) L. Puppo / (Argentina) M. González	1	1
13	(Spain) J.G. Diestro / (Spain) P. Fernandéz	6	6
15	(Spain) A. Cépero / (Chile) J. Valdés	6	6
(Chile) C. Martinez / (Chile) C. Molina	2	1
(Argentina) A. Chozas / (Argentina) V. Libaak	2	0
7	(Spain) A. Ruíz / (Spain) Momo	6	6
5	(Argentina) Chingotto / (Argentina) J. Tello	6	6
(Argentina) L. Augsburger / (Argentina) S. Rolla	2	1
(Argentina) F. Domínguez / (Argentina) N. Suescun	5	3
10	(Argentina) M. Lamperti / (Spain) J. Sanz	7	6
9	(Argentina) A. Gutiérrez / (Brazil) L. Campagnolo	6	6
(Argentina) I. Sager / (Spain) M. Cordoba	1	1
(Argentina) C. Gutiérrez / (Sweden) D. Windahl	1	1
4	(Argentina) Stupaczuk / (Brazil) Lima	6	6
3	(Argentina) A. Tapia / (Argentina) Sanyo	6	6
(Uruguay) H. Ensslin / (Brazil) J.P. Flores	2	1
(Argentina) L. Mambrini / (Argentina) J.P. Nazar	4	4
12	(Spain) F. Gil / (Argentina) R. Moyano	6	6
16	(Spain) E. Alonso / (Spain) J. Esbri	6	6
(Argentina) I. Andenmatten / (Argentina) R. Ferreyra	2	0
(Argentina) J. Astoreca / (Argentina) M. Maldonado	0	1
6	(Argentina) Belasteguín / (Spain) Coello	6	6
8	(Argentina) L. Capra / (Argentina) Maxi	6	6
(Argentina) F. Erguy / (Argentina) M. Rivero	1	2
(Argentina) J. Blasco / (Argentina) M. Pascual	6	4
11	(Argentina) J.C. Belluati / (Argentina) R. Moyano	7	6
14	(Spain) I. Ramírez / (Spain) M. Semmler	6	6
(Argentina) B. Heck / (Argentina) N. Egea	1	0
(Argentina) G. Escobar / (Argentina) J. Gaitan	0	4
2	(Argentina) Di Nenno / (Spain) Paquito	6	6

Round of 16
1	(Spain) Galán / (Spain) Lebrón	6	6
13	(Spain) J.G. Diestro / (Spain) P. Fernandéz	3	4
15	(Spain) A. Cépero / (Chile) J. Valdés	3	2
7	(Spain) A. Ruíz / (Spain) Momo	6	6
5	(Argentina) Chingotto / (Argentina) J. Tello	5	6	6
10	(Spain) J. Sanz / (Argentina) M. Lamperti	7	3	3
9	(Argentina) A. Gutiérrez / (Brazil) L. Campagnolo	6	5
4	(Argentina) F. Stupaczuk / (Brazil) Lima	7	7
3	(Argentina) Tapia / (Argentina) Sanyo	6	6
12	(Spain) F. Gil / (Argentina) R. Moyano	1	1
16	(Spain) E. Alonso / (Spain) J. Esbri	1	2
6	(Argentina) Belasteguín / (Spain) Coello	6	6
8	(Argentina) L. Capra / (Argentina) Maxi	6	3
11	(Argentina) J.C. Belluati / (Argentina) R. Moyano	7	6
14	(Spain) I. Ramírez / (Spain) M. Semmle	4	2
2	(Argentina) Di Nenno / (Spain) Paquito	6	6

Quarterfinals
1	(Spain) Galán / (Spain) Lebrón	6	6
7	(Spain) A. Ruíz / (Spain) Momo	4	4
4	(Argentina) F. Stupaczuk / (Brazil) Lima	7	6
5	(Argentina) Chingotto / (Argentina) J. Tello	6	3
3	(Argentina) A. Tapia / (Argentina) Sanyo	4	3
6	(Argentina) Belasteguín / (Spain) Coello	6	6
11	(Argentina) J.C. Belluati/ (Argentina) R. Moyano	4	5
2	(Argentina) Di Nenno / (Spain) Paquito	6	7

Semifinals
1	(Spain) Galán/ (Spain) Lebrón	4	2
4	(Argentina) F. Stupaczuk / (Brazil) Lima	6	6
6	(Argentina) Belasteguín / (Spain) Coello	7	6
2	(Argentina) Di Nenno / (Spain) Paquito	6	3

Final
4	(Argentina) F. Stupaczuk / (Brazil) Lima	6	4	7
6	(Argentina) Belasteguín / (Spain) Coello	2	6	6

=== First Round ===
Date	Winners	Score	Opponent	Refs.
9/8/2022	(Spain) Arnau Ayats (Argentina) Denis Perino	6–4 / 7–5	(Argentina) Felipe Calleja (Argentina) Tomás Luco	
9/8/2022	(Argentina) Luciano Puppo (Argentina) Matías González	5–0 / W.O.	(Chile) Ignacio Lehyt (Chile) Sebastian Muñoz	
9/8/2022	(Chile) Cristobal Martinez (Chile) Cristobal Molina	5–7 / 6–3 / 7–6	(Argentina) Fernando Muñoz (Argentina) Sebastian Solenghi	
9/8/2022	(Argentina) Alex Chozas (Argentina) Valentino Libaak	6–2 / 7–6	(Argentina) Javier Reiter (Argentina) Leonardo Yob	
9/8/2022	(Argentina) Leo Augsburger (Argentina) Santiago Rolla	6–2 / 6–1	(Argentina) Gabriel Molina (Argentina) German Buenanueva	
9/8/2022	(Argentina) Facundo Domínguez (Argentina) Nicolás Suescun	6–2 / 6–1	(Ecuador) Carlos Luna (Argentina) Valentino Acosta	
9/8/2022	(Argentina) Ignacio Sager (Spain) Marcos Cordoba	5–7 / 6–4 / 7–6	(Argentina) Luca Cortese (Argentina) Valentin San Juan	
9/8/2022	(Argentina) Cristian German Gutiérrez (Sweden) Daniel Windahl	6–7 / 6–1 / 6–3	(Italy) Lorenzo Di Giovanni (Argentina) Mauro Salandro	
9/8/2022	(Uruguay) Higor Ensslin (Brazil) Joao Pedro Flores	7–5 / 6–3	(Argentina) Facundo López (Argentina) Gonzalo Sassano	
9/8/2022	(Argentina) Juan Pablo Dip Nazar (Argentina) Lautaro Mambrini	6–3 / 6–1	(Italy) Alessandro Tinti (Italy) Federico Beltrami	
9/8/2022	(Argentina) Ivo Andenmatten (Argentina) Relis Ferreyra	4–6 / 7–5 / 6–2	(Argentina) Dylan Cuello (Argentina) Julián Leite	
9/8/2022	(Argentina) Joaquin De Astoreca (Argentina) Máximo Maldonado	6–1 / 6–1	(Chile) Ian Walker (Argentina) Pablo Molina	
9/8/2022	(Argentina) Facundo Erguy (Argentina) Mauricio Rivero	6–0 / 5–4 / W.O.	(Argentina) Fabio Maldonado (Argentina) Mariano Romano	
9/8/2022	(Argentina) Juan De Pascual (Argentina) Maxi Sánchez Blasco	3–6 / 7–5 / 6–3	(Italy) Marco Cassetta (Italy) Simone Cremona	
9/8/2022	(Argentina) Baltazar Parra Heck (Argentina) Nicolás Egea	7–6 / 6–1	(Brazil) Andre Freitas (Brazil) Pedro Toccafondo	
9/8/2022	(Argentina) Gonzalo Escobar (Argentina) Joaquin Gaitan	3–6 / 6–3 / 6–4	(Argentina) Lucas Danuzzo (Uruguay) Martin Araujo	

=== Round of 32 ===
Date	Winners	Score	Opponent	Refs.
10/8/2022	(Spain) Alejandro Galán (Spain) Juan Lebrón	6–2 / 6–4	(Spain) Arnau Ayats (Argentina) Denis Perino	
10/8/2022	(Spain) Antonio Fernandez (Spain) José Garica Diestro	6–1 / 6–1	(Argentina) Luciano Puppo (Argentina) Matías González	
10/8/2022	(Spain) Alvaro Cepero (Chile) Javier Valdes	6–2 / 6–1	(Chile) Cristobal Martinez (Chile) Cristobal Molina	
10/8/2022	(Spain) Alex Ruiz (Spain) Momo Gonzalez	6–2 / 6–0	(Argentina) Alex Chozas (Argentina) Valentino Libaak	
10/8/2022	(Argentina) Federico Chingotto (Argentina) Juan Ignacio Tello	6–2 / 6–1	(Argentina) Leo Augsburger (Argentina) Santiago Rolla	
10/8/2022	(Spain) Jon Sanz (Argentina) Miguel Lamperti	7–5 / 6–3	(Argentina) Facundo Domínguez (Argentina) Nicolás Suescun	
10/8/2022	(Argentina) Agustin Gutiérrez (Brazil) Lucas Campagnolo	6–1 / 6–1	(Argentina) Ignacio Sager (Spain) Marcos Cordoba	
10/8/2022	(Argentina) Franco Stupaczuk (Brazil) Pablo Lima	6–1 / 6–1	(Argentina) Cristian German Gutiérrez (Sweden) Daniel Windahl	
10/8/2022	(Argentina) Agustín Tapia (Argentina) Sanyo Gutiérrez	6–2 / 6–1	(Uruguay) Higor Ensslin (Brazil) Joao Pedro Flores	
10/8/2022	(Spain) Francisco Gil Morales (Argentina) Ramiro Moyano	6–4 / 6–4	(Argentina) Juan Pablo Dip Nazar (Argentina) Lautaro Mambrini	
10/8/2022	(Spain) Eduardo Alonso (Spain) Juanlu Esbri	6–2 / 6–0	(Argentina) Ivo Andenmatten (Argentina) Relis Ferreyra	
10/8/2022	(Spain) Arturo Coello (Argentina) Fernando Belasteguín	6–0 / 6–1	(Argentina) Joaquin De Astoreca (Argentina) Máximo Maldonado	
10/8/2022	(Argentina) Lucho Capra (Argentina) Maxi Sánchez	6–1 / 6–2	(Argentina) Facundo Erguy (Argentina) Mauricio Rivero	
10/8/2022	(Argentina) Agustin Gomez Silingo (Argentina) Juan Cruz Belluati	7–6 / 6–4	(Argentina) Juan De Pascual (Argentina) Maxi Sánchez Blasco	
10/8/2022	(Spain) Iván Ramírez (Spain) Miguel Semmler	6–1 / 6–0	(Argentina) Baltazar Parra Heck (Argentina) Nicolás Egea	
10/8/2022	(Argentina) Martin Di Nenno (Spain) Paquito Navarro	6–0 / 6–4	(Argentina) Gonzalo Escobar (Argentina) Joaquin Gaitan	

=== Round of 16 ===
Date	Winners	Score	Opponent	Refs.
11/8/2022	(Spain) Alejandro Galán (Spain) Juan Lebrón	6–3 / 6–4	(Spain) Antonio Fernandez (Spain) José Garica Diestro	
11/8/2022	(Spain) Alex Ruiz (Spain) Momo Gonzalez	6–3 / 6–2	(Spain) Alvaro Cepero (Chile) Javier Valdes	
11/8/2022	(Argentina) Federico Chingotto (Argentina) Juan Ignacio Tello	5–7 / 6–3 / 6–3	(Spain) Jon Sanz (Argentina) Miguel Lamperti	
11/8/2022	(Argentina) Franco Stupaczuk (Brazil) Pablo Lima	7–6 / 7–5	(Argentina) Agustin Gutiérrez (Brazil) Lucas Campagnolo	
11/8/2022	(Argentina) Agustín Tapia (Argentina) Sanyo Gutiérrez	6–1 / 6–1	(Spain) Francisco Gil Morales (Argentina) Ramiro Moyano	
11/8/2022	(Spain) Arturo Coello (Argentina) Fernando Belasteguín	6–1 / 6–2	(Spain) Eduardo Alonso (Spain) Juanlu Esbri	
11/8/2022	(Argentina) Agustin Gomez Silingo (Argentina) Juan Cruz Belluati	7–6 / 6–3	(Argentina) Lucho Capra (Argentina) Maxi Sánchez	
11/8/2022	(Argentina) Martin Di Nenno (Spain) Paquito Navarro	6–4 / 6–2	(Spain) Iván Ramírez (Spain) Miguel Semmler	

=== Quarter-Finals ===
Date	Winners	Score	Opponent	Refs.
12/8/2022	(Spain) Alex Ruiz (Spain) Momo Gonzalez	6–4 / 6–4	(Spain) Alejandro Galán (Spain) Juan Lebrón	
12/8/2022	(Argentina) Franco Stupaczuk (Brazil) Pablo Lima	7–6 / 6–3	(Argentina) Federico Chingotto (Argentina) Juan Ignacio Tello	
12/8/2022	(Spain) Arturo Coello (Argentina) Fernando Belasteguín	6–4 / 6–3	(Argentina) Agustín Tapia (Argentina) Sanyo Gutiérrez	
12/8/2022	(Argentina) Martin Di Nenno (Spain) Paquito Navarro	6–4 / 7–5	(Argentina) Agustin Gomez Silingo (Argentina) Juan Cruz Belluati	

=== Semi-Finals ===
Date	Winners	Score	Opponent	Refs.
13/8/2022	(Argentina) Franco Stupaczuk (Brazil) Pablo Lima	6–4 / 6–2	(Spain) Alex Ruiz (Spain) Momo Gonzalez	
13/8/2022	(Spain) Arturo Coello (Argentina) Fernando Belasteguín	7–6 / 6–3	(Argentina) Martin Di Nenno (Spain) Paquito Navarro	

=== Finals ===
Date	Winners	Score	Opponent	Refs.
14/8/2022	(Argentina) Franco Stupaczuk (Brazil) Pablo Lima	6–2 / 4–6 / 7–6	(Spain) Arturo Coello (Argentina) Fernando Belasteguín	

== Points and prize money ==
=== Points and money distribution ===
Below is a series of tables showing the ranking points and money a player can earn.

Event	First round	Second Round	Round of 16	QF	SF	F	W
Points	18	45	90	180	300	600	1000
