= Premier Padel 2022 =

Details
- Duration: 28 March - 11 December
- Edition: 1st
- Tournaments: 8
- Categories: Major (4); P1 (4)

Achievements (singles)
- Most titles: (Spain) Alejandro Galán (Spain) Juan Lebrón
- Most finals: (Spain) Alejandro Galán (Spain) Juan Lebrón

Premier Padel 2022 was the 1st edition of the Premier Padel circuit, promoted by the International Padel Federation, and with the financial backing of Nasser Al-Khelaïfi.

From the start of the competition, there were conflicts between the World Padel Tour and the top circuit players, as they also wanted to play in the Premier Padel. This led the WPT to file a lawsuit against the top 20 ranked players, arguing that they could only compete exclusivelly in their tournaments. Ultimately, despite the lawsuit, the players decided to compete in the first tournament, with the World Padel Tour's number 2 ranked team, Martín Di Nenno and Paquito Navarro, emerging victorious in the final.

The first edition of Premier Padel ended with Alejandro Galán and Juan Lebrón as number 1 ranked pair, having won 4 of the 8 tournaments.

== Schedule ==
| Tournament | City | Country | Date |
|---|---|---|---|
| Ooredo Catar Major | Doha | Qatar | 28 March - 2 April |
| Italy Premier Padel Major | Roma | Italy | 21 May - 29 May |
| París Premier Padel Major | París | France | 11 July - 17 July |
| Madrid Premier Padel P1 | Madrid | Spain | 1 August - 6 August |
| Argentina Premier Padel P1 | Mendoza | Argentina | 8 August - 14 August |
| NewGiza Premier Padel P1 | Giza | Egypt | 24 October - 30 October |
| Mexico Premier Padel Major | Monterrey | Mexico | 28 November - 4 December |
| Milano Premier Padel P1 | Milán | Italy | 5 December - 11 December |

== Results ==
Major
P1

| Tournament | Winners | Runners-up | Score |
|---|---|---|---|
| (Qatar) Doha | (Argentina) Martín Di Nenno (Spain) Paquito Navarro | (Spain) Alejandro Galán (Spain) Juan Lebrón | 6–3 / 7–6 |
| (Italy) Roma | (Spain) Alejandro Galán (Spain) Juan Lebrón | (Argentina) Martín Di Nenno (Spain) Paquito Navarro | 4–6 / 7–5 / 6–4 |
| (France) Paris | (Spain) Alejandro Galán (Spain) Juan Lebrón | (Argentina) Federico Chingotto (Argentina) Juan Tello | 6–3 / 4–6 / 6–4 |
| (Spain) Madrid | (Spain) Alejandro Galán (Spain) Juan Lebrón | (Argentina) Martín Di Nenno (Spain) Paquito Navarro | 5–7 / 6–2 / 6–3 |
| (Argentina) Mendoza | (Argentina) Franco Stupaczuk (Brazil) Pablo Lima | (Spain) Arturo Coello (Argentina) Fernando Belasteguín | 6–2 / 4–6 / 7–6 |
| (Egypt) Giza | (Argentina) Franco Stupaczuk (Brazil) Pablo Lima | (Spain) Alejandro Galán (Spain) Juan Lebrón | 2–6 / 7–6 / 7–6 |
| (Mexico) Monterrey | (Spain) Arturo Coello (Argentina) Fernando Belasteguín | (Argentina) Agustín Tapia (Argentina) Sanyo Gutiérrez | 6–3 / 3–6 / 6–3 |
| (Italy) Milan | (Spain) Alejandro Galán (Spain) Juan Lebrón | (Brazil) Lucas Bergamini (Spain) Víctor Ruiz | 6–2 / 6–2 |
