= 2020 WPT Marbella Master =

World Padel Tour tournament held in Marbella, Spain

- Date: 2 – 8 March
- Edition: 10th (Note: The first seven editions were held under the organization of the Padel Pro Tour, while the eight edition was contested as a Open tournament.)
- Category: Master
- Location: Marbella, Spain
- Venue: Palacio de los Deportes Elena Benitez

Champions
- Men's doubles: (Brazil) Pablo Lima (Spain) Paquito Navarro
- Women's doubles: (Spain) Marta Marrero (Spain) Paula Josemaría

Chronology
Previous
Master Final
(2019)
Next
Estrella Damm Open

The 2020 Marbella Master (officially 2020 World Padel Tour Cervezas Victoria Marbella Master) was the first tournament of the eight season organized by World Padel Tour, the most prestigious padel circuit at the time.

In the women's category, the top two ranked pairs both reached the final for their first head-to-head of the season. The first finalists were the world number ones, Alejandra Salazar and Ariana Sánchez, who defeated the third-ranked pair, Bea González and Marta Ortega, to reach the final. Their opponents were the second-ranked pair, Marta Marrero and Paula Josemaria, who defeated Gemma Triay and Lucia Sainz in the semi-final. In the final, Marrero and Josemaria defeated Ariana and Salazar, in three sets to become the inaugural champions of the season. With the victory, Marta Marrero not only retained the title she won (for the first time) last season, while for Paula was the first in Marbella, but also became the sole leader of the ranking.

In the men's category, the two best-ranked pairs also reached the final to face their former partners from the previous season. The first finalists were Pablo Lima and Paquito Navarro, who defeated Matías Díaz and Maxi Sánchez in the semifinals. Their opponents were Alejandro Galán and Juan Lebrón, who defeated the third-ranked pair, Franco Stupaczuk and Sanyo Gutiérrez, to reach the final. In the final, with the number one ranking at stake, Lima and Paquito defeated Galán and Lebrón in three sets, becoming the inaugural champions of the season and taking over as the number 1 pair on the circuit. With the victory, Paquito would win his first title in Marbella, the second for Lima (having won in 2012), and would take sole possession of the top ranking.

== Relevant Data ==
=== Changes in the rankings and new pairs ===
==== The world's number 1 pair splits up ====
The first change would be the separation of the world's number 1 pair, Juan Lebrón and Paquito Navarro. Despite Lebrón and Paquito becoming the first Spanish pair to reach the pinnacle of professional padel, the Spaniards would choose to end their partnership. Their paths would be linked with another pair that also separated, Alejandro Galán and Pablo Lima, who were the most competitive pair during the second half of the season, and after joining forces in June. Paquito would return to playing with Lima, with whom he had already played some tournaments in 2018, while Lebrón would join Galán, with whom he had already won the World Pairs Championship in 2018.

==== Sanyo chooses Stupaczuk and Maxi returns to playing with Matí ====
Another pair that would also separate was the number 2 ranked pair, Maxi Sánchez and Sanyo Gutiérrez, who had managed to stay at the top of the rankings until November. Their partners would be the members of the 5th-ranked pair, who would also split up, Franco Stupaczuk and Matías Díaz, with Stupaczuk joining Sanyo and Matías joining Maxi, with whom he had already played in 2017.

==== The number one ranked women's pair also separate ====
On the women's side, Marta Ortega and Marta Marrero would aso end their partnership for the 2020 season, just 365 days after officially announcing their union. Marrero would join one of Spain's rising young talents, Paula Josemaría, while Ortega would choose the young prodigy Bea González, just 19 years old, as her new partner.

=== The Golden Point arrives in Padel ===
The biggest news for the 2020 season was the introduction of the 'Golden Point' concept. That is, when the score reaches 40-40 (or 'equality'), a single decisive point is played (replacing the traditional scoring sequence). The receiver chooses which side the serve will be directed to, and the result of that point determines who wins the game.

The main objective of the introduction of the 'golden point' was to shorten matches, making them more dynamic. By eliminating the 'advantage' phase and the almost infinite possibility of repeated ties, the duration of individual games, and consequently, entire tournaments, could be significantly reduced. This measure aimed to make padel more attractive to spectators and to television broadcasters.

== Head-to-head record between teams ranked in the top 4 during the season ==
=== Men's ===
Record	Galán–Lebrón	Lima–Paquito	Sanyo–Stupaczuk	Díaz–Maxi
Galán–Lebrón	—	0–1	1–0	—
Lima–Paquito	1–0	—	—	1–0
Sanyo–Stupaczuk	0–1	—	—	—
Díaz–Maxi	—	0–1	—	—

=== Women's ===
Record	Ariana–Salazar	Josemaria–Marrero	Bea–Ortega	Delfina–Nogueira
Ariana–Salazar	—	0–1	1–0	—
Josemaria–Marrero	1–0	—	—	—
Bea–Ortega	0–1	—	—	—
Delfina–Nogueira	—	—	—	—

== Draws ==
=== Men's Bracket ===
Round of 32
1	(Spain) Galán / (Spain) Lebrón	7	6
(Argentina) L. Capra / (Argentina) R. Moyano	6	2
Q	(Argentina) A. Britos / (Spain) M. Del Castillo	6	0
(Spain) Coki / (Spain) J. Rico	7	6
(Argentina) A. Gutiérrez / (Argentina) C. Gutiérrez	6	6
Q	(Argentina) A. Patiniotis / (Spain) M. Yanguas	3	2
(Brazil) L. Campagnolo / (Brazil) M. Jardim	7	4	5
6	(Spain) J. Ruiz / (Spain) U. Botello	6	6	7
8	(Spain) J. Garrido / (Spain) J. Mieres	1	4
(Argentina) M. Grabiel / (Spain) P. Fernández	6	6
(Spain) E. Moreno / (Spain) J. Rico	6	6
(Argentina) F. Quiles / (Argentina) J.C. Belluati	1	1
(Spain) A. Ruiz / (Spain) M. Piñeiro	4	4
(Spain) A. Santana / (Spain) G. Rubio
(Spain) R. Rivera / (Spain) T. Bueno	6	3
3	(Argentina) Sanyo / (Argentina) Stupaczuk	7	6
4	(Argentina) M. Díaz / (Argentina) Maxi	6	6
(Argentina) Godo Díaz / (Argentina) M. Marina	3	1
(Spain) J.G. Diestro / (Spain) V. Ruiz	6	6
(Spain) J. Barahona / (Spain) J. Gutiérrez	2	3
Q	(Spain) C. Fuster / (Argentina) D. Perino	6	7
(Spain) Á. Cepero / (Spain) P. Lijó	1	6
(Spain) A. Blanco / (Spain) J. Martinez	2	1
5	(Argentina) Belasteguín / (Argentina) Tapia	6	6
7	(Argentina) F. Chingotto / (Argentina) J. Tello	6	3
(Argentina) A. Allemandi / (Spain) Momo	7	6
(Spain) N. Gadea / (Argentina) S. Nerone	2	0
(Brazil) L. Bergamini / (Argentina) M. Lamperti	6	6
Q	(Spain) F. Gil Morales / (Spain) S. Alba	3	6	6
(Uruguay) D. Ramos / (Argentina) J. Vázquez	6	2	2
(Argentina) A. Silingo / (Argentina) Di Nenno	6	5	0
2	(Brazil) Lima / (Spain) Paquito	3	7	6

Round of 16
1	(Spain) Galán / (Spain) Lebrón	7	6
(Spain) Coki / (Spain) J. Rico	5	1
(Argentina) A. Gutiérrez / (Argentina) C. Gutiérrez	7	1	2
6	(Spain) J. Ruiz / (Spain) U. Botello	6	6	6
(Argentina) M. Grabiel / (Spain) P. Fernández	*
(Spain) E. Moreno / (Spain) J. Rico
(Spain) A. Santana / (Spain) G. Rubio	3	0
3	(Argentina) Sanyo / (Argentina) Stupaczuk	6	6
4	(Argentina) M. Díaz / (Argentina) Maxi	6	6
(Spain) J.G. Diestro / (Spain) V. Ruiz	2	1
(Spain) C. Fuster / (Argentina) D. Perino	2	4
5	(Argentina) Belasteguín / (Argentina) Tapia	6	6
(Argentina) A. Allemandi / (Spain) Momo	7	3	6
(Brazil) L. Bergamini / (Argentina) M. Lamperti	6	6	3
Q	(Spain) F. Gil Morales / (Spain) S. Alba	4	2
2	(Brazil) Lima / (Spain) Paquito	6	6

Quarter-Final
1	(Spain) Galán / (Spain) Lebrón	6	6
6	(Spain) J. Ruiz / (Spain) U. Botello	2	2
(Argentina) M. Grabiel / (Spain) P. Fernández	5	3
3	(Argentina) Sanyo / (Argentina) Stupaczuk	7	6
4	(Argentina) M. Díaz / (Argentina) Maxi	6	2	7
5	(Argentina) Belasteguín / (Argentina) Tapia	4	6	6
(Argentina) A. Allemandi / (Spain) Momo	1	2
2	(Brazil) Lima / (Spain) Paquito	6	6

Semi-Finals
1	(Spain) Galán / (Spain) Lebrón	7	3	7
3	(Argentina) Sanyo / (Argentina) Stupaczuk	6	6	6
4	(Argentina) M. Díaz / (Argentina) Maxi	4	4
2	(Brazil) Lima / (Spain) Paquito	6	6

Finals
1	(Spain) Galán / (Spain) Lebrón	6	6	3
2	(Brazil) Lima / (Spain) Paquito	7	2	6

=== Women's Bracket ===
Round of 32
1	(Spain) Ariana / (Spain) Salazar	6	7
(Spain) E. Carnicero / (Spain) M. Merino	3	5
(Spain) A.F. de Ossó / (Spain) L. Martínez	6	7
(Spain) A. Blanco / (Spain) E. Ramirez	3	5
(Spain) A. Martinez / (Spain) N. Rodríguez	2	0
(Spain) B. Caldera / (Spain) C. Goenaga	6	6
(Spain) L. Rufo / (Spain) M. Talavan	4	3
6	(Spain) E. Amatriain / (Spain) P. Llaguno	6	6
7	(Spain) Majo / (Spain) Mapi	6	6
Q	(Spain) E. Frances / (Spain) G. León	0	2
(France) L. Clergue / (France) L. Godallier	5	2
(Argentina) N. Brito / (Spain) X. Clasca	7	6
Q	(Spain) B. Las Heras / (Spain) I. Dominguez	7	4	7
(Spain) A. Tapia / (Spain) J. Castelló	6	6	5
(Uruguay) A. De los Santos / (Spain) J. Bautista	1	3
3	(Spain) Bea González / (Spain) M. Ortega	6	6
4	(Portugal) A.C. Nogueira / (Argentina) D. Brea	6	6
(France) A. Collombon / (Spain) N. Traviesa	2	1
(Spain) S. Hernández / (Spain) T. Icardo	6	6
(Spain) A. Cantin / (Spain) S. Ruiz	2	2
Q	(Spain) C. Carrascosa / (Brazil) M. Schuck	5	0
(Spain) N. Rovira / (Spain) S. Pujals	7	6
(Spain) A. Galán / (Spain) V. Iglesias	1	3
5	(Spain) Gemma / (Spain) L. Sainz	6	6
8	(Spain) C. Navarro / (Argentina) C. Reiter	6	6	3
(Argentina) A. Osoro / (Spain) T. Navarro	4	7	6
(Spain) L. Alonso / (Brazil) R. Piltcher	6	6
(Spain) M. Villalba / (Spain) V. Virseda	4	4
(Argentina) C. Tenorio / (Argentina) J. Bidahorria	5	6
(Spain) C. Mesa / (Argentina) C. Paz	7	7
(Portugal) S. Araújo / (Argentina) V. Riera	2	2
2	(Spain) M. Marrero / (Spain) P. Josemaría

Round of 16
1	(Spain) Ariana / (Spain) Salazar	6	6
(Spain) A.F. de Ossó / (Spain) L. Martínez	0	4
(Spain) B. Caldera / (Spain) C. Goenaga	4	4
6	(Spain) E. Amatriain / (Spain) P. Llaguno	6	6
7	(Spain) Majo / (Spain) Mapi	6	6
(Argentina) N. Brito / (Spain) X. Clasca	1	2
Q	(Spain) B. Las Heras / (Spain) I. Dominguez	1	3
3	(Spain) Bea González / (Spain) M. Ortega	6	6
4	(Portugal) A.C. Nogueira / (Argentina) D. Brea	7	7
(Spain) S. Hernández / (Spain) T. Icardo	5	6
(Spain) N. Rovira / (Spain) S. Pujals	5	0
5	(Spain) Gemma / (Spain) L. Sainz	7	6
(Argentina) A. Osoro / (Spain) T. Navarro	6	6
(Spain) L. Alonso / (Brazil) R. Piltcher	2	1
(Spain) C. Mesa / (Argentina) C. Paz	3	5
2	(Spain) M. Marrero / (Spain) P. Josemaría	6	7

Quarter-Final
1	(Spain) Ariana / (Spain) Salazar	6	6
6	(Spain) E. Amatriain / (Spain) P. Llaguno	3	2
7	(Spain) Majo / (Spain) Mapi	2	4
3	(Spain) Bea González / (Spain) M. Ortega	6	6
4	(Portugal) A.C. Nogueira / (Argentina) D. Brea
5	(Spain) Gemma / (Spain) L. Sainz	*
(Argentina) A. Osoro / (Spain) T. Navarro	3	3
2	(Spain) M. Marrero / (Spain) P. Josemaría	6	6

Semi-Finals
1	(Spain) Ariana / (Spain) Salazar	7	6
3	(Spain) Bea González / (Spain) M. Ortega	5	3
5	(Spain) Gemma / (Spain) L. Sainz	6	6	1
2	(Spain) M. Marrero / (Spain) P. Josemaría	4	7	6

Finals
1	(Spain) Ariana / (Spain) Salazar	6	6	2
2	(Spain) M. Marrero / (Spain) P. Josemaría	7	4	6

== Results ==
=== Round of 32 ===
Men's
Date	Winners	Score	Opponent	Ref.
4/3/2020	(Spain) Alejandro Galán (Spain) Juan Lebrón	7–6 / 6–2	(Argentina) Lucho Capra (Argentina) Ramiro Moyano	
4/3/2020	(Spain) Coki Nieto (Spain) Javi Rico	7–6 / 6–0	(Argentina) Andrés Britos (Spain) Mario Del Castillo	
4/3/2020	(Argentina) Agustin Gutiérrez (Argentina) Cristian Gutiérrez	6–3 / 6–2	(Argentina) Aris Patiniotis (Spain) Mike Yanguas	
4/3/2020	(Spain) Javi Ruiz (Spain) Uri Botello	6–7 / 6–4 / 7–5	(Brazil) Lucas Campagnolo (Brazil) Marcello Jardim	
4/3/2020	(Argentina) Maxi Grabiel (Spain) Pincho Fernández	6–1 / 6–4	(Spain) Javi Garrido (Spain) Juani Mieres	
4/3/2020	(Spain) Ernesto Moreno (Spain) José Rico	6–1 / 6–1	(Argentina) Federico Quiles (Argentina) Juan Cruz Belluati	
4/3/2020	(Spain) Aday Santana (Spain) Gonzalo Rubio	6–4 / 6–4	(Spain) Alejandro Ruiz (Spain) Martin Sánchez Piñeiro	
4/3/2020	(Argentina) Franco Stupaczuk (Argentina) Sanyo Gutiérrez	7–6 / 6–3	(Spain) Rubén Rivera (Spain) Toni Bueno	
4/3/2020	(Spain) Matías Díaz (Argentina) Maxi Sánchez	6–3 / 6–1	(Argentina) Godo Díaz (Argentina) Matías Marina Artusa	
4/3/2020	(Spain) José García Diestro (Spain) Victor Ruiz	6–2 / 6–3	(Spain) Javier Barahona (Spain) Jorge Gutiérrez	
4/3/2020	(Spain) Christian Fuster (Argentina) Denis Perino	6–1 / 7–6	(Spain) Álvaro Cepero (Spain) Pablo Lijó	
4/3/2020	(Argentina) Agustín Tapia (Argentina) Fernando Belasteguín	6–2 / 6–1	(Spain) Adrián Blanco (Spain) Javier Martinez Vazquez	
4/3/2020	(Argentina) Adrián Allemandi (Spain) Momo González	7–6 / 6–3	(Argentina) Federico Chingotto (Argentina) Juan Tello	
4/3/2020	(Brazil) Lucas Bergamini (Argentina) Miguel Lamperti	6–2 / 6–0	(Spain) Nacho Gadea (Argentina) Sebastián Nerone	
4/3/2020	(Spain) Francisco Gil Morales (Spain) Sergio Alba	3–6 / 6–2 / 6–2	(Uruguay) Diego Ramos (Argentina) Juan Manuel Vázquez	
4/3/2020	(Brazil) Pablo Lima (Spain) Paquito Navarro	3–6 / 7–5 / 6–0	(Argentina) Agustin Gomez Silingo (Argentina) Martín Di Nenno	

Women's
Date	Winners	Score	Opponent	Ref.
4/3/2020	(Spain) Alejandra Salazar (Spain) Ariana Sánchez	6–3 / 7–5	(Spain) Esther Carnicero (Spain) Melania Merino	
4/3/2020	(Spain) Ana Fernández de Ossó (Spain) Lucía Martínez	6–3 / 7–5	(Spain) Alicia Blanco Rojo (Spain) Elena Ramirez	
4/3/2020	(Spain) Beatriz Caldera (Spain) Carmen Goenaga	6–2 / 6–0	(Spain) Araceli Martinez (Spain) Nuria Rodriguez	
4/3/2020	(Spain) Elisabeth Amatriain (Spain) Patricia Llaguno	6–4 / 6–3	(Spain) Lorena Rufo (Spain) Marta Talavan	
4/3/2020	(Spain) Majo Sánchez (Spain) Mapi Sánchez	6–0 / 6–2	(Spain) Estela Frances (Spain) Gala León García	
4/3/2020	(Argentina) Nela Brito (Spain) Xenia Clasca	7–5 / 6–2	(France) Laura Clergue (France) Léa Godallier	
4/3/2020	(Spain) Barbara Las Heras (Spain) Isabel Dominguez	7–6 / 4–6 / 7–5	(Spain) Anna Cortiles Tapia (Spain) Jessica Castelló	
4/3/2020	(Spain) Bea González (Spain) Marta Ortega	6–1 / 6–3	(Uruguay) Andreína De los Santos (Spain) Julia Polo Bautista	
4/3/2020	(Portugal) Ana Catarina Nogueira (Argentina) Delfina Brea	6–2 / 6–1	(France) Alix Collombon (Spain) Nicole Traviesa Mola	
4/3/2020	(Spain) Sandra Hernández (Spain) Tamara Icardo	6–2 / 6–2	(Spain) Angela Caro Cantin (Spain) Sara Ruiz	
4/3/2020	(Spain) Nuria Rovira (Spain) Sara Pujals	7–5 / 6–0	(Spain) Cristina Carrascosa (Brazil) Manuela Schuck	
4/3/2020	(Spain) Gemma Triay (Spain) Lucia Sainz	6–1 / 6–3	(Spain) Alba Galán (Spain) Victoria Iglesias	
4/3/2020	(Argentina) Aranzazu Osoro (Spain) Teresa Navarro	4–6 / 7–6 / 6–3	(Spain) Carolina Navarro (Argentina) Cecilia Reiter	
4/3/2020	(Spain) Lorena Alonso (Brazil) Raquel Piltcher	6–4 / 6–4	(Spain) Maria Villalba (Spain) Verónica Virseda	
4/3/2020	(Spain) Carla Mesa (Argentina) Celeste Paz	7–5 / 7–6	(Argentina) Catalina Tenorio (Argentina) Julieta Bidahorria	
4/3/2020	(Spain) Marta Marrero (Spain) Paula Josemaría	6–2 / 6–2	(Portugal) Sofia Araújo (Argentina) Virginia Riera	

=== Round of 16 ===
Men's
Date	Winners	Score	Opponent	Ref.
5/3/2020	(Spain) Alejandro Galán (Spain) Juan Lebrón	7–5 / 6–1	(Spain) Coki Nieto (Spain) Javi Rico	
5/3/2020	(Spain) Javi Ruiz (Spain) Uri Botello	6–7 / 6–1 / 6–2	(Argentina) Agustin Gutiérrez (Argentina) Cristian Gutiérrez	
5/3/2020	(Argentina) Maxi Grabiel (Spain) Pincho Fernández	W.O.	(Spain) Ernesto Moreno (Spain) José Rico	
5/3/2020	(Argentina) Franco Stupaczuk (Argentina) Sanyo Gutiérrez	6–3 / 6–0	(Spain) Aday Santana (Spain) Gonzalo Rubio	
5/3/2020	(Spain) Matías Díaz (Argentina) Maxi Sánchez	6–2 / 6–1	(Spain) José García Diestro (Spain) Victor Ruiz	
5/3/2020	(Argentina) Agustín Tapia (Argentina) Fernando Belasteguín	6–2 / 6–4	(Spain) Christian Fuster (Argentina) Denis Perino	
5/3/2020	(Argentina) Adrián Allemandi (Spain) Momo González	7–6 / 3–6 / 6–3	(Brazil) Lucas Bergamini (Argentina) Miguel Lamperti	
5/3/2020	(Brazil) Pablo Lima (Spain) Paquito Navarro	6–4 / 6–2	(Spain) Francisco Gil Morales (Spain) Sergio Alba	

Women's
Date	Winners	Score	Opponent	Ref.
5/3/2020	(Spain) Alejandra Salazar (Spain) Ariana Sánchez	6–0 / 6–4	(Spain) Ana Fernández de Ossó (Spain) Lucía Martínez	
5/3/2020	(Spain) Elisabeth Amatriain (Spain) Patricia Llaguno	6–4 / 6–4	(Spain) Beatriz Caldera (Spain) Carmen Goenaga	
5/3/2020	(Spain) Majo Sánchez (Spain) Mapi Sánchez	6–1 / 6–2	(Argentina) Nela Brito (Spain) Xenia Clasca	
5/3/2020	(Spain) Bea González (Spain) Marta Ortega	6–1 / 6–3	(Spain) Barbara Las Heras (Spain) Isabel Dominguez	
5/3/2020	(Portugal) Ana Catarina Nogueira (Argentina) Delfina Brea	7–5 / 7–6	(Spain) Sandra Hernández (Spain) Tamara Icardo	
5/3/2020	(Spain) Gemma Triay (Spain) Lucia Sainz	7–5 / 6–0	(Spain) Nuria Rovira (Spain) Sara Pujals	
5/3/2020	(Argentina) Aranzazu Osoro (Spain) Teresa Navarro	6–2 / 6–1	(Spain) Lorena Alonso (Brazil) Raquel Piltcher	
5/3/2020	(Spain) Marta Marrero (Spain) Paula Josemaría	6–3 / 7–5	(Spain) Carla Mesa (Argentina) Celeste Paz	

=== Quarter-Finals ===
Men's
Date	Winners	Score	Opponent	Ref.
6/3/2020	(Spain) Alejandro Galán (Spain) Juan Lebrón	6–2 / 6–2	(Spain) Javi Ruiz (Spain) Uri Botello	
6/3/2020	(Argentina) Franco Stupaczuk (Argentina) Sanyo Gutiérrez	7–5 / 6–3	(Argentina) Maxi Grabiel (Spain) Pincho Fernández	
6/3/2020	(Spain) Matías Díaz (Argentina) Maxi Sánchez	6–4 / 2–6 / 7–6	(Argentina) Agustín Tapia (Argentina) Fernando Belasteguín	
6/3/2020	(Brazil) Pablo Lima (Spain) Paquito Navarro	6–1 / 6–2	(Argentina) Adrián Allemandi (Spain) Momo González	

Women's
Date	Winners	Score	Opponent	Ref.
6/3/2020	(Spain) Alejandra Salazar (Spain) Ariana Sánchez	6–3 / 6–2	(Spain) Elisabeth Amatriain (Spain) Patricia Llaguno	
6/3/2020	(Spain) Bea González (Spain) Marta Ortega	6–2 / 6–4	(Spain) Majo Sánchez (Spain) Mapi Sánchez	
6/3/2020	(Spain) Gemma Triay (Spain) Lucia Sainz	W.O.	(Portugal) Ana Catarina Nogueira (Argentina) Delfina Brea	
6/3/2020	(Spain) Marta Marrero (Spain) Paula Josemaría	6–3 / 6–3	(Argentina) Aranzazu Osoro (Spain) Teresa Navarro	

=== Semi-Finals ===
Men's
Date	Winners	Score	Opponent	Ref.
7/3/2020	(Spain) Alejandro Galán (Spain) Juan Lebrón	7–6 / 3–6 / 7–6	(Argentina) Franco Stupaczuk (Argentina) Sanyo Gutiérrez	
7/3/2020	(Brazil) Pablo Lima (Spain) Paquito Navarro	6–4 / 6–4	(Spain) Matías Díaz (Argentina) Maxi Sánchez	

Women's
Date	Winners	Score	Opponent	Ref.
7/3/2020	(Spain) Alejandra Salazar (Spain) Ariana Sánchez	7–5 / 6–3	(Spain) Bea González (Spain) Marta Ortega	
7/3/2020	(Spain) Marta Marrero (Spain) Paula Josemaría	4–6 / 7–6 / 6–1	(Spain) Gemma Triay (Spain) Lucia Sainz	

=== Finals ===
Men's
Date	Winners	Score	Opponent	Ref.
8/3/2020	(Brazil) Pablo Lima (Spain) Paquito Navarro	7–6 / 2–6 / 6–3	(Spain) Alejandro Galán (Spain) Juan Lebrón	

Women's
Date	Winners	Score	Opponent	Ref.
8/3/2020	(Spain) Marta Marrero (Spain) Paula Josemaría	7–6 / 4–6 / 6–2	(Spain) Alejandra Salazar (Spain) Ariana Sánchez	
