= Premier Padel =

Professional padel circuit

- Sport: Padel
- Founded: 2022; 4 years ago
- Affiliation: International Padel Federation
- Owner: Qatar Sports Investments
- Chairman: Nasser Al-Khelaifi
- Replaced: World Padel Tour

Official website
- premierpadel.com

Premier Padel (officially Qatar Airways Premier Padel Tour for sponsorship purposes) is an international padel circuit organized by the International Padel Federation (FIP), with the support of the Professional Padel Association (PPA) and sponsored by Qatar Sports Investments (QSI), which brings together professional male and female players to compete in its events.

The circuit was created as an alternative to the World Padel Tour, owned by the Catalan company Setpoint Events, a subsidiary of Damm, which was accused by the FIP and the players before the European Commission of abusing a dominant market position. QSI later acquired the World Padel Tour, which ceased to exist after eleven editions, leaving Premier Padel as the main international professional circuit.

== Description ==
In its first season, the circuit featured eight venues across three continents: four Majors (in Qatar, Paris, Italy and Mexico) worth 2,000 FIP ranking points and offering €525,000 in prize money plus four P1 events (in Madrid, Argentina, Egypt and Milan) worth 1,000 ranking points and €250,000 in prizes.

In 2024, in its third edition and the first as the main world circuit, the number of tournaments would be expanded to 24 with the addition of nine new P2 category tournaments, the tournaments of lesser importance in terms of points (awarding 500 ranking points), along with the Premier Padel Finals, the end-of-season event with the 16 best players from the men's and women's ranking (the equivalent of the Master Final in the World Padel Tour), which awards 1500 ranking points.

== Editions ==
Ed.	Year	Men's doubles champions		Women's doubles champions
I	2022	(Spain) Alejandro Galán	(Spain) Juan Lebrón	No women's category held
II	2023	(Argentina) Agustín Tapia	(Spain) Arturo Coello	(Spain) Ariana Sánchez	(Spain) Paula Josemaría
III	2024	(Argentina) Agustín Tapia	(Spain) Arturo Coello	(Spain) Ariana Sánchez	(Spain) Paula Josemaría
IV	2025	(Argentina) Agustín Tapia	(Spain) Arturo Coello	(Spain) Gemma Triay	(Argentina) Delfina Brea
V	2026	(Argentina) Agustín Tapia	(Spain) Arturo Coello

Note: Originally, the FIP ranking at the end of 2023 included points earned in tournaments from the 2022 and 2023 editions, and for women, also points from some WPT events. Thus, Galán and Lebrón finished as the number 1 pair in the FIP ranking, despite Coello and Tapia being the athletes with the most points earned during the year, considering only their performance during 2023. This would be retroactively corrected, with the FIP recognizing Coello and Tapia as the number 1s of 2023 (presumably adding the points from the World Padel Tour and Premier Padel tournaments held in that same season).

== Most tournaments won ==
Updated on 16 November 2026

=== Men's division ===
Pos.	Player	Total	P2	P1	Major	Finals	Last tournament won
1st	(Spain) Arturo Coello	45	11	21	12	1	31/10/2026
2nd	(Argentina) Agustín Tapia	44	11	21	11	1	31/10/2026
3rd	(Spain) Alejandro Galán	25	9	12	4	—	06/09/2026
4th	(Argentina) Federico Chingotto	19	9	8	2	—	06/09/2026
5th	(Spain) Juan Lebrón	10	3	5	2	—	15/11/2026
6th	(Argentina) Franco Stupaczuk	5	2	2	1	—	16/03/2025
7th	(Argentina) Martín Di Nenno	4	1	1	2	—	07/09/2025
8th	(Argentina) Leandro Augsburger	3	1	2	—	—	15/11/2026
9th	(Spain) Coki Nieto	2	—	—	1	1	22/12/2024
9th	(Spain) Jon Sanz	2	—	—	1	1	22/12/2024
9th	(Brazil) Pablo Lima	2	—	2	—	—	30/10/2022
11th	(Argentina) Fernando Belasteguín	1	—	—	1	—	04/12/2022
11th	(Spain) Paquito Navarro	1	—	—	1	—	02/04/2022
11th	(Spain) Mike Yanguas	1	1	—	—	—	26/10/2024
11th	(Spain) Francisco Cabeza	1	1	—	—	—	02/03/2025
11th	(Spain) Diego García	1	—	—	—	—	02/03/2025

=== Women's Division ===
Pos.	Player	Total	P2	P1	Major	Finals	Last Tournament Won
1st	(Spain) Gemma Triay	23	7	9	7	—	31/10/2026
1st	(Spain) Paula Josemaría	23	8	10	4	1	28/06/2026
2nd	(Argentina) Delfina Brea	23	9	9	5	—	31/10/2026
3rd	(Spain) Ariana Sánchez	22	5	11	5	1	18/10/2026
4th	(Spain) Bea González	19	9	8	1	1	07/09/2025
5th	(Spain) Claudia Fernández	15	4	8	2	1	15/11/2026
6th	(Spain) Andrea Ustero	1	2	3	1	—	18/10/2026
7th	(Spain) Marta Ortega	3	2	—	1	—	26/10/2024
7th	(Portugal) Sofia Araujo	3	3	—	—	—	06/07/2025
7th	(Spain) Martina Calvo	3	1	2	—	—	24/03/2024
8th	(Argentina) Claudia Jensen	2	1	1	—	—	5/07/2026
9th	(Spain) Tamara Icardo	1	1	—	—	—	5/07/2026
9th	(Spain) Jéssica Castelló	1	—	1	—	—	24/03/2024

== See also ==
- Padel Pro Tour
- World Padel Tour
- International Padel Federation
- List of FIP number 1 ranked padel players
