= Pablo José Lima =

Brazilian professional padel player

Pablo Lima
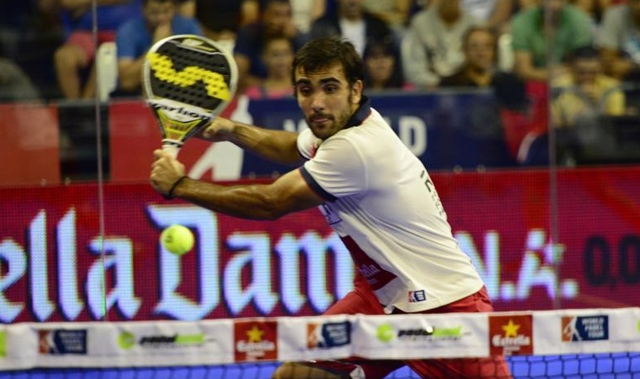

Personal information
- Full name: Pablo José Mongelo Lima
- Nickname: El cañón de Porto Alegre
- Born: 11 October 1986 (age 40) Porto Alegre, Brazil
- Height: 1.80 m (5 ft 11 in)
- Weight: 75 kg (165 lb)

Sport
- Country: Brazil
- Sport: pádel
- Position: drive
- Turned pro: 2004

Achievements and titles
- Highest world ranking: 1st (2015, 2016, 2017)

Pablo José Mongelo Lima (born 11 October 1986), more known as Pablo Lima, is a Brazilian former professional padel player. He considered the best player in his country's history in the sport. Alongside his former partner Juani Mieres, he managed to challenge the best pair in the history of professional padel, Fernando Belasteguín and Juan Martín Díaz. After that pair split in 2015, Lima teamed with Belasteguín, becoming the undisputed kings of the circuit until losing the number 1 ranking in 2018.

== Career ==
=== First years ===
Lima began his padel career at the age of 9 with his father at the Hormiga Club in his hometown of Porto Alegre. He frequently represented his country's junior team and achieved a remarkable record, starting in 2004, that allowed him to enter the Spanish padel circuit under the guidance of Roby Gattiker, who was impressed by his playing style and dedication and convinced him to become his partner during the 2006 and 2007 seasons.

=== 2008–2014 ===
He began his role as a "revelation" player by forming a team with his compatriot Marcello Jardim, reaching the quarterfinals 14 times and the semifinals 4 times despite an ankle injury that caused him great discomfort in developing the padel he would have liked. From that year onwards, so fruitful in sporting achievements, he formed the legendary pair of "Princes" alongside Juani Mieres, winning many titles such as Madrid, Logroño, Salamanca and Seville Open's, and also reaching finals in Almería, Madrid, San Sebastián and Barcelona. He then teamed up with Juani Mieres, with whom he became the second best pair on the circuit and regullary facing the kings of the circuit, the Argentinians Fernando Belasteguín and Juan Martín Díaz.

=== Partnership with Fernando Belasteguín ===
==== 2015 ====
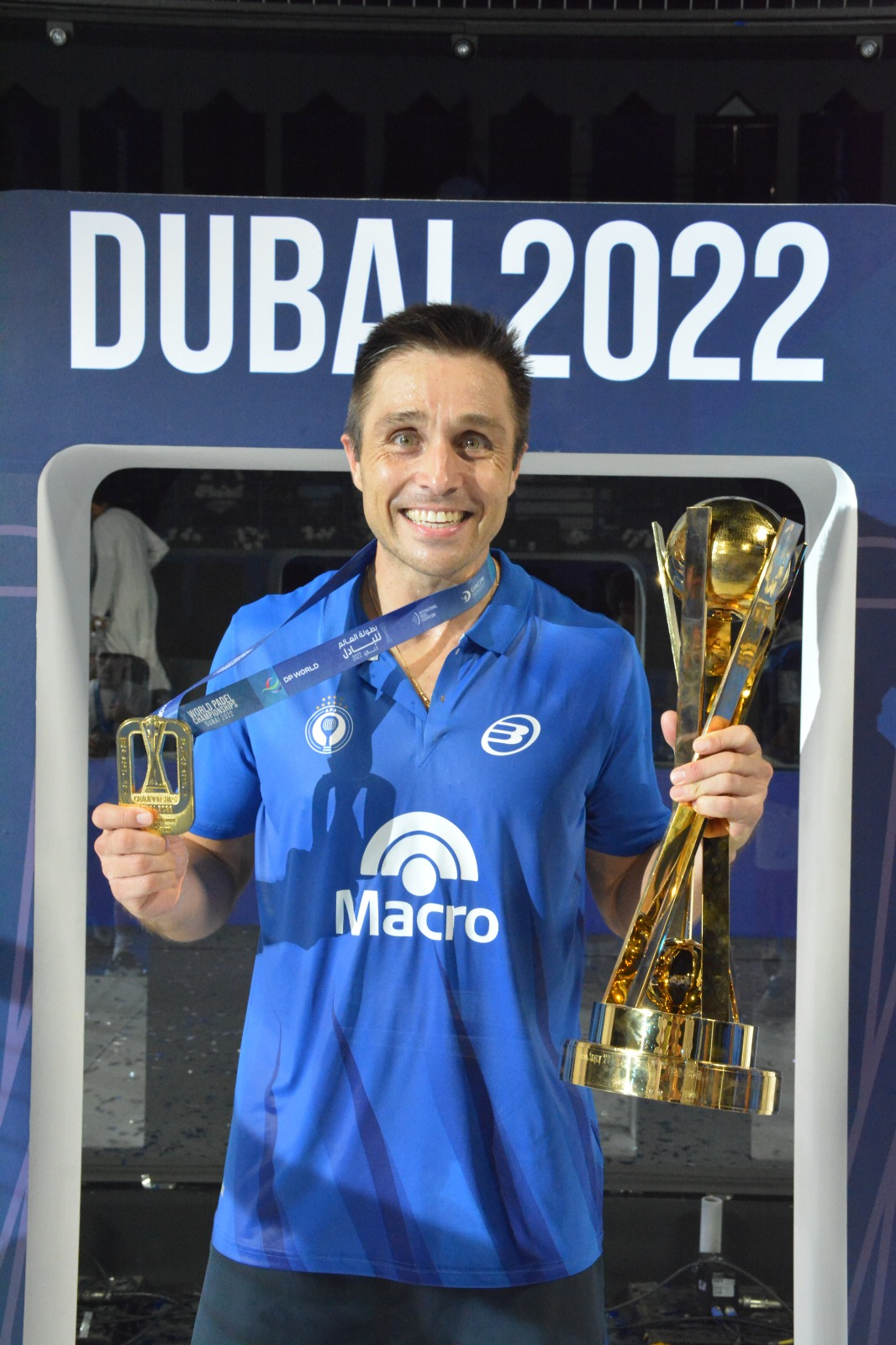
Fernando Belasteguín, who along with Lima, was number one ranked for three years

Following the separation with Juan Martin Díaz, 13-time world number one Fernando Belasteguín invited Lima to become his new partener. Lima accepted the offer, ending his six-year partnership with Juani Mieres. Mieres subsequently partnered with Juan Martín Díaz. Belasteguín and Lima began the season in the Barcelona Open, reaching the semifinals, but were forced to withdraw due to an injury sustained by Lima. While Lima recovered, Belasteguín competed in the next two tournaments with Willy Lahoz, winning both. With Lima's return, thy won their first title together in the Río Gallegos Open, beating Maxi Sánchez and Sanyo Gutiérrez in the final. After this win, they began a dominant run, winning the next five Open tournaments in Valladolid, Mallorca, Málaga, La Nucía, and Monte Carlo.

In the Mallorca, Málaga, and La Nucía finals, they defeated Sánchez and Belasteguín's former partner, Juan Martín Díaz. Their winning streak ended in the Madrid Open, where they were eliminated in the first round via walkover, due to a Belasteguín injury. They returned to competition winning five consecutive Open's, in Seville, A Coruña, Dubai, Euskadi, and Valencia. They finished the season in the Madrid Master Final, where they were forced to withdraw in the semifinals against Díaz and Sánchez, due to a Lima injury. Belasteguín finished the season as the ranked No. 1, having won 13 out of 16 tournaments, with all three defeats coming from injury withdraws.

==== 2016 ====
Lima and Bela began the new season winning the Gijón Open. During the Valencia Master, Belasteguín and Lima were eliminated in the semifinals by Paquito Navarro and Sanyo Gutiérrez, their main rivals during the 2016 and 2017 seasons. They responded winning the Barcelona Master, and the Las Rozas de Madrid, Palma de Mallorca, Valladolid, and Las Palmas Open's. In three of these five finals, they defeated Paquito and Sanyo. The winning streak ended in the La Nucía Open, where they were forced to withdraw from the final.

Belasteguín and Lima won the next four tournament finals, with three of them being against Paquito and Sanyo. Despite not competing in the Mendoza Open due to a Belasteguín injury, they won the Buenos Aires Master and the San Sebastián Open, defeating Navarro and Gutiérrez in both finals. They concluded the season reaching the semifinals of the Master Final. With 12 out of 16 tournaments won, with Pablo Lima, Belasteguín reached 15 consecutive years as the world No. 1 ranked, for which he was presented with a commemorative plaque by the World Padel Tour.

==== 2017 ====
The 2017 season with Belasteguín and Lima losing two consecutive finals to Paquito Navarro and Sanyo Gutiérrez. They responded winning the Barcelona Master and the A Coruña Open, but were forced to withdraw from the final of the Valladolid Open due to a Belasteguín injury, which gave Navarro and Gutiérrez their third title of the season. With Belasteguín injured, they missed the one more tournament, the Mijas Open, and returned to competition in the Gran Canaria Open, exiting in the quarterfinals. In the Alicante Open, Belasteguín and Lima reached the final, and avenged their defeats, beating Paquito and Sanyo to win the tournament.

At the Seville Open, the two teams faced off once again in the final. Before the final, each team had reached six finals and won three titles during the season. Navarro and Gutiérrez won the match, with Navarro lifting the trophy in his hometown. Belasteguín and Lima avenged the loss, defeating them in the Portugal Master final. They faced each other again in the Andorra Open final, losing it and now having one less title than Paquito and Sanyo. After beating Navarro and Gutiérrez in the Granada Open final, both teams were tied with ten finals contested and five titles each.

With four tournaments remaining, Belasteguín and Lima won the Zaragoza Open, defeating the third-ranked pair of Matías Díaz and Maxi Sánchez. They followed it, winning the Buenos Aires Master, beating Navarro and Gutiérrez in the final and extending their advantage in the No. 1 Ranking race. Despite losing the Bilbao Open, reaching the final secured them the No. 1 Ranking. At the Master Final, Belasteguín and Lima avenged the previous loss to Díaz and Sánchez in the finals of the tournament, closing the season with eight out of sixteen tournaments won.

=== Injuries and final seasons with Belasteguín ===
==== 2018 ====
Belasteguín and Lima had a difficult start of the season, in the dispute to retain No.1 Ranking for a fourth consecutive year. They started the season being unexpectedly eliminated in the semifinals of the Catalonia Master, by Juan Lebrón and Juan Belluati. Despite winning the Alicante Open, they failed to win any of the next three tournaments. They didn't compete in the Zaragoza Open, were eliminated in the quarter-finals of the Jaén Open, and exited in the round of 16 at the Valladolid Open.

These results allowed Sanyo Gutiérrez and Maxi Sánchez, who had won three of the first five tournaments, threatening the No. 1 position that Lima had since 2015. Belasteguín and Lima responded winning the Valencia Master, which allowed to distance themself in the Ranking race, and winning the Båstad Open, defeating Juan Martín Díaz and Paquito Navarro in the final. During the Mijas Open, Belasteguín suffered a severe elbow injury that forced the team to withdraw from the quarter-finals. Halfway through the season, they remained ranked No. 1, though Gutiérrez and Sánchez had reached six finals and won four titles compared to Belasteguín and Lima's three finals and two titles.

The injury Belasteguín sustained in Mijas, sidelined him for several months, forcing him to miss the Andorra and Lugo Open's, the Portugal Master, the Granada Open and Euskadi Open's, the Argentina Master, and the Murcia Open. During this period while Belasteguín recovered, Lima temporarily held the No. 1 Ranking alone, competing with Agustín Gómez Silingo and Paquito Navarro and winning the Bilbao Open and reaching the final of the Murcia Open with the latter. But after Gutiérrez and Sánchez won the Portugal Master, Sánchez assumed the No. 1 Ranking, a position which he and Sanyo would retained for the rest of the season, ending the Brazilian-Argentine 3-year reign as the world number one ranked team.

After a four-month absence, Belasteguín returned in the final tournament of the season, the 2018 Madrid Master Final, reuniting with Lima. They reached the final, and defeated the new No. 1 ranked team, Sanyo and Maxi (7–6, 6–3).

==== 2019 ====
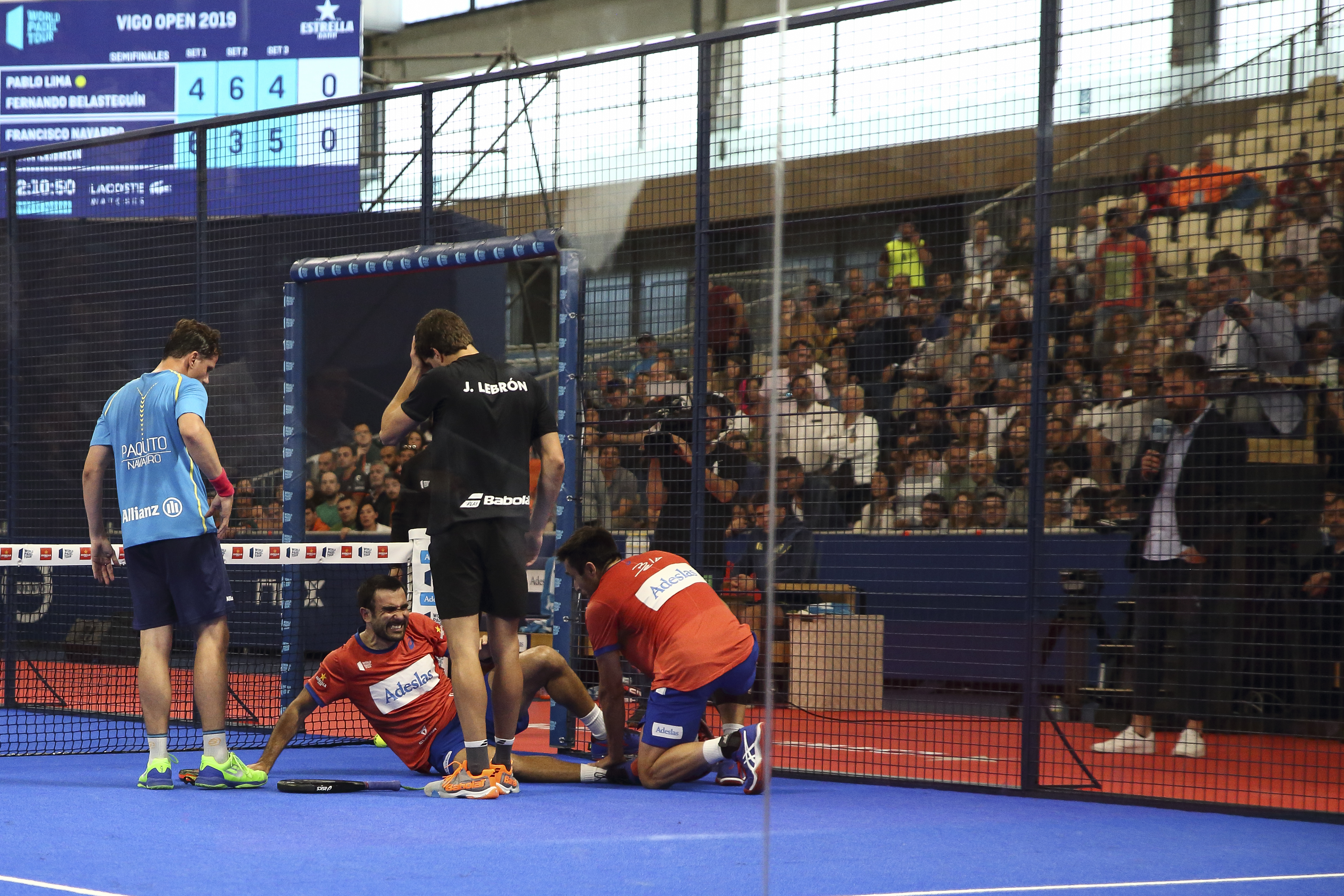
Bela and Lima in a match with Paquito and Lebrón.

In 2019, Belasteguín and Lima continued competing together, aiming to reclaim the No. 1 Ranking. They began the season with two semifinal losses, in the Marbella Master and the Logroño Open, losing on both occasions to Juan Lebrón and Paquito Navarro. They reached the final of the Alicante Open, but again lost to Lebrón and Paquito. They reached two more semifinals, in the Vigo and Jaén Open's, again losing to Lebrón and Navarro. Due to these results, Belasteguín opted to end the partnership, with both players agreeing to complete together at the Buenos Aires Master, Valladolid Master, and Båstad Open, before breaking up. At the Buenos Aires Master, they reached the final, where they faced Alejandro Galán and Juani Mieres. However, they were forced to withdraw in the first set, with a 5–5 score, due to injury.

Belasteguín and Lima concluded their partnership with three consecutive seasons as the top-ranked team. They played 44 finals and won 35 titles together.

=== Partnership with Alejandro Galán ===
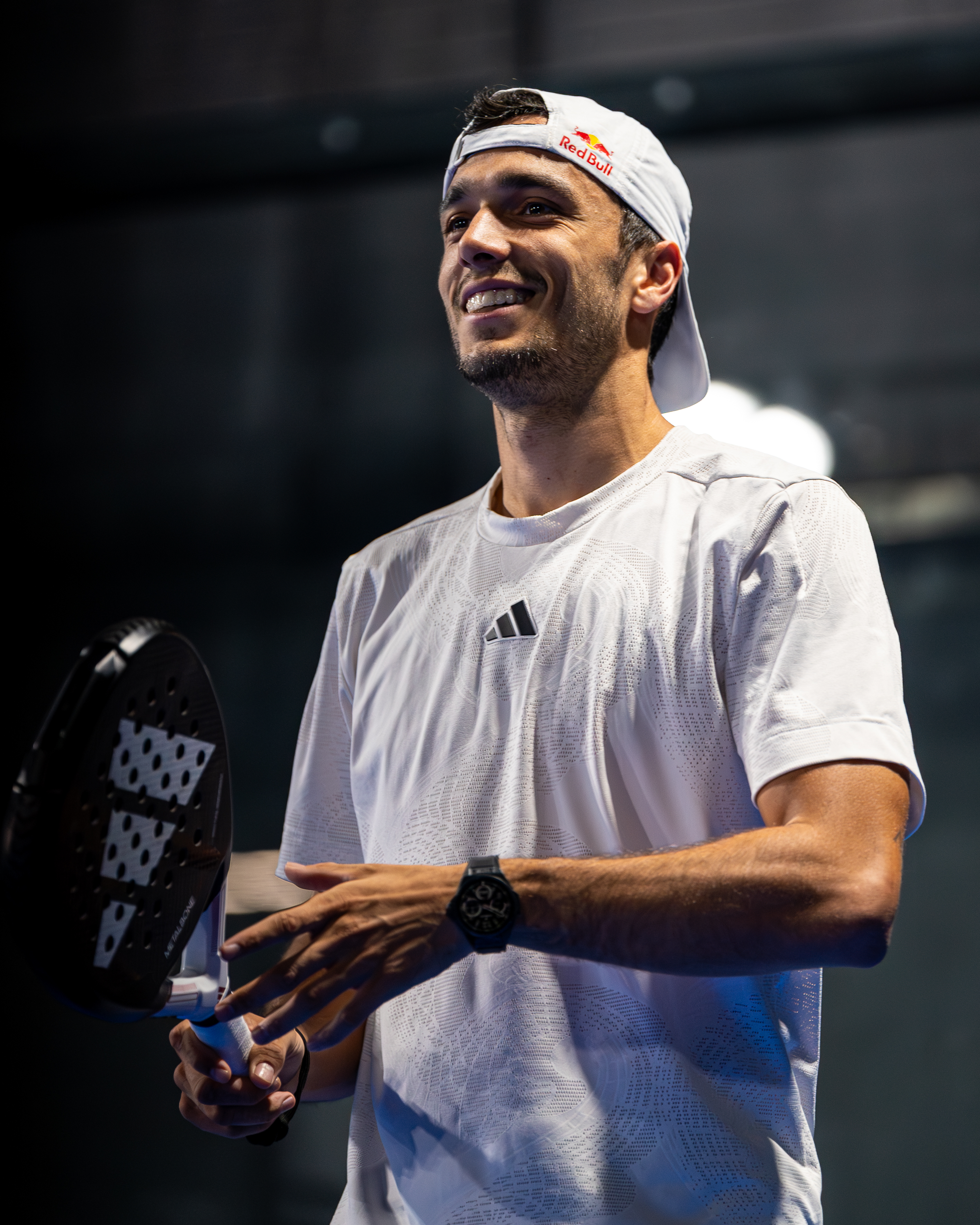
Alejandro Galán, who Lima played with in second half of the 2019 World Padel Tour season.

After the separation, Lima choose Alejandro Galán as his new partner, They debuted in the Valencia Open, reaching the final and winning the tournament. They also won the next tournament, the Mijas Open. Their first loss came against in the Madrid Master quarter-finals, but they bounced back winning the Portugal Master, their third tournament title in four disputed. In the last four tournaments they're best result were two semi-finals, in the São Paulo Open, in Lima's home country, and in Mexico. In the Master Finals, World Padel Tour end of season tournament, they defeated Augustín Tapia and Fernando Belasteguín in the final, winning their fourth tournament of the season.

Despite winning four of the nine tournaments they played together, Galán and Lima opted to part ways, with Lima becoming Paquito Navarro's new sporting partner.

=== 2020 ===
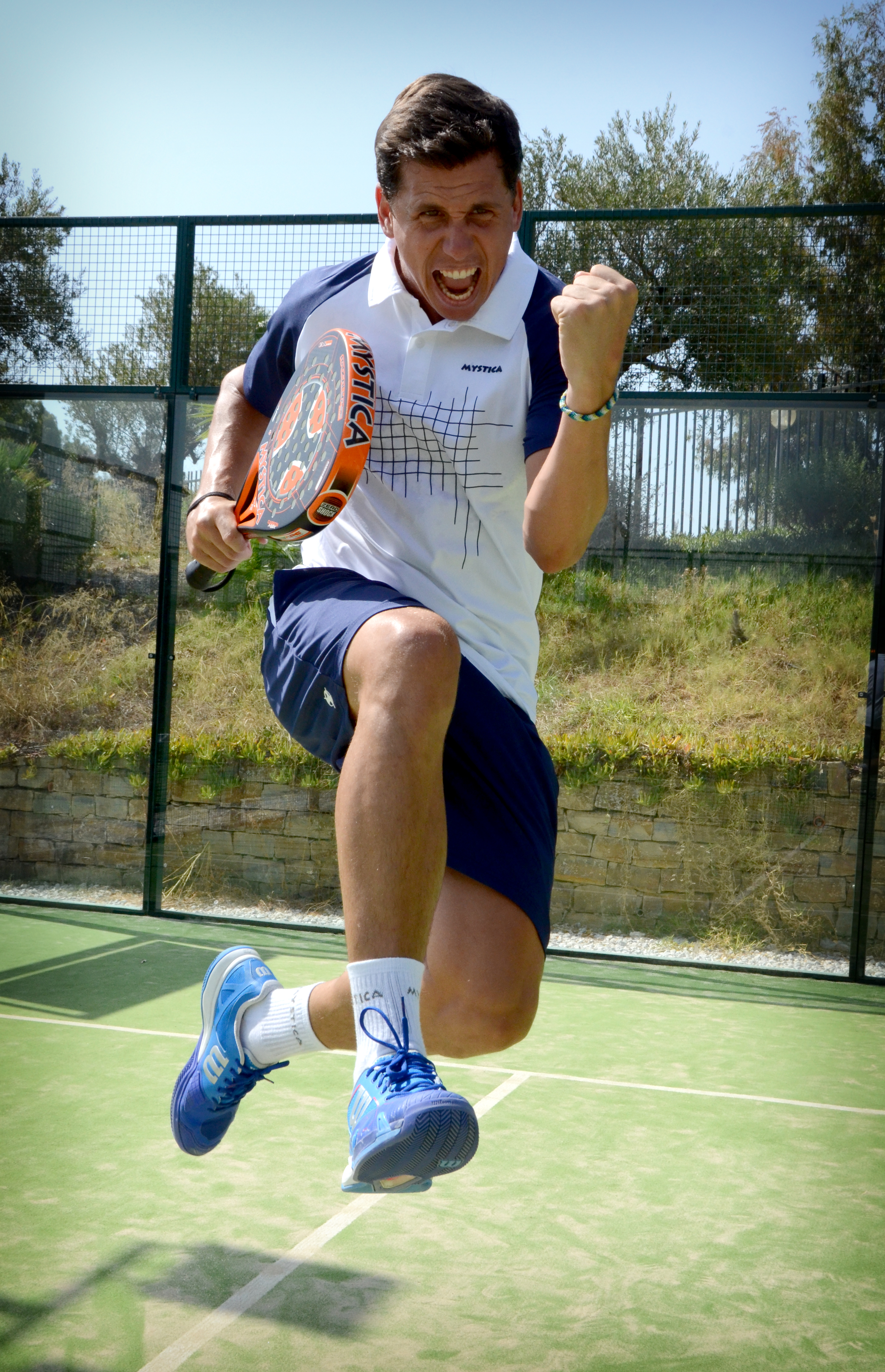
Paquito Navarro, who Lima played with in 2020.

In the first and only tournament of the season before the COVID-19 break, the Marbella Master, Lima and Paquito defeated Alejandro Galán and Juan Lebrón in the final. Three months after the shutdown, they returned to competition reaching the final of the Estrella Damm Open, in a rematch with Galán and Lebrón, losing in two sets. In the next six tournaments, the Spanish-Brazilian pair reached four semi-finals but were unable to progress in any of them. In the tenth tournament of the season, the Las Rozas Open, Lima and Paquito reached their third final of the season but do to a Lima injury they had to forfeit the last match. The injury obtained in Las Rozas also forced Lima to miss the Master Finals.

=== 2021 ===
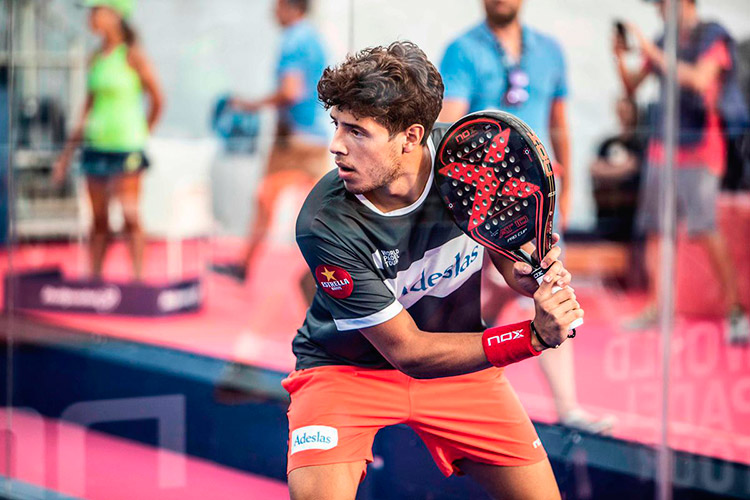
Agustín Tapia played together with Lima in 2021.

In 2021 due to the disappointing results of the previous season, Lima and Paquito opted to split as team, with Agustín Tapia chosen as his next partner. Despiste reaching two semi-finals in their first four tournaments together, the duo wasn't able to reach a final until the fifth tournament of the season, the Marbella Master where they were supposed to face Alejandro Galán and Juan Lebrón but had to forfeit due to an injury. Two early exits in the next two tournaments were followed by a title win in the Las Rozas Open , where the Brazilian-Argentinian duo defeated the number one ranked team, Galán and Lebrón, in the semi-finals and the number two ranked Belasteguín and Gutiérrez in the final. In the following tournament, the Málaga Open, they reached another final defeating the third ranked pair, Martin Di Nenno and Paquito Navarro.

After the summer break, they returned in the Cascais Master, but weren't able to progress past the quarter-finals. After reaching two quarter-finals and semi-final in the following three tournaments, Lima and Tapia decided to part ways. As a replacement, Lima choose Javi Ruiz as his partner for the rest of the season. In the remaining five tournaments of the season, they reached the semi-finals only twice, gaining enough points to qualify for the Master Finals. In the last tournament of the season, now playing with the Momo González, Lima reached the quarter-finals finishing the season 12th in the ranking.

=== 2022 ===
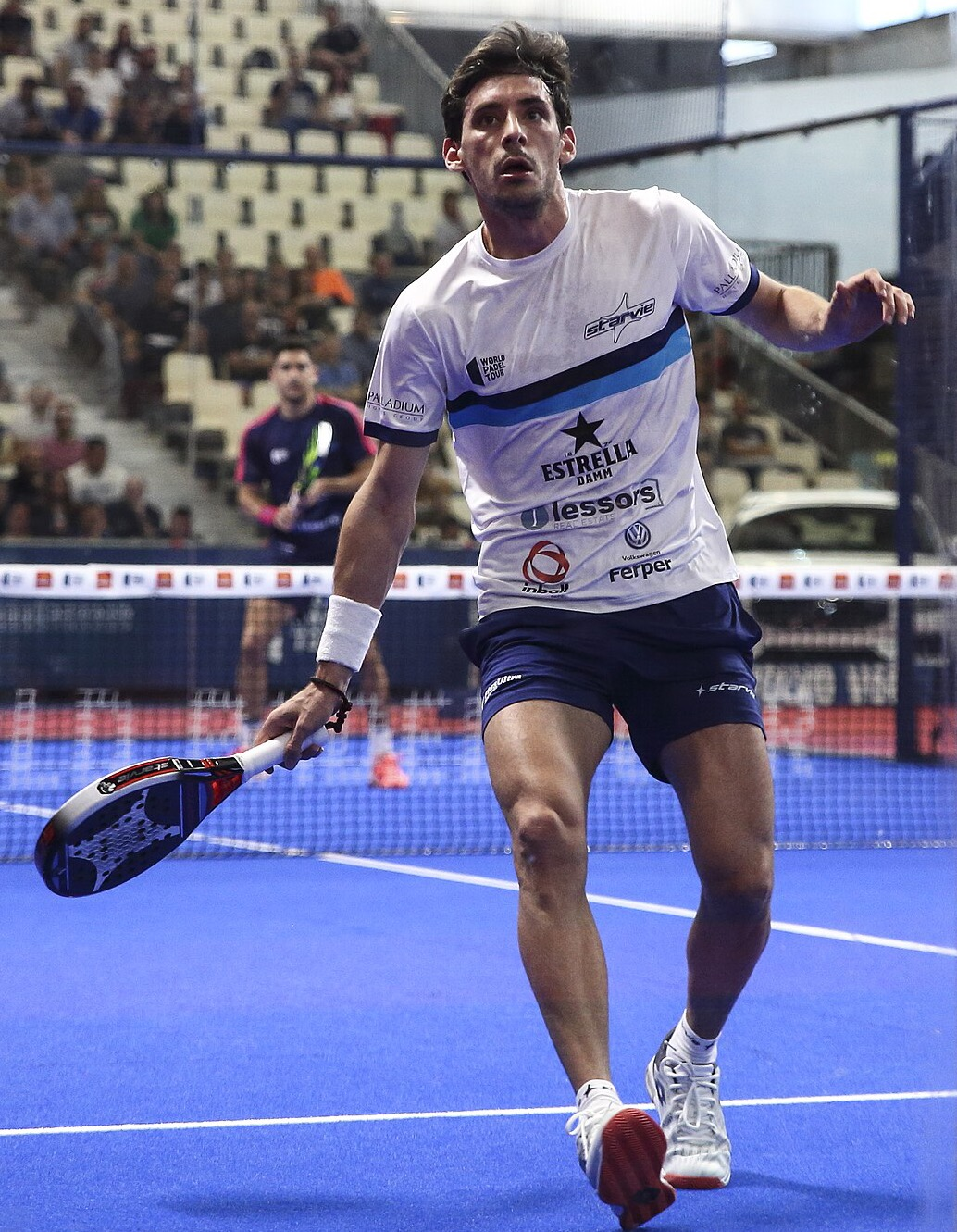
Franco Stupaczuk played with Lima for most of 2022.

In 2022, Lima joined forces with former numer one ranked Maxi Sanchéz, starting the year as the sixth ranked team. After being eliminated in the quarter-finals of four consecutive World Padel Tour tournaments, and being eliminated in the round of 16 of Premier Padel's first tournament the Qatar Major, the duo opted to part ways, with Lima choosing Franco Stupaczuk as his next partner.

In their first tournament together they reached the final of the Brussels Open, but were defeated by the number one ranked Galán and Lebrón. In the following four tournaments they only reached one semi-final, but in the ninth tournament of the WPT season, the French Open, after defeating the second ranked team of Martin Di Nenno and Paquito Navarro in the semi-finals, they avenged their previous loss against Galán and Lebrón to claim their first of the season.

They followed their tournament win with two quarter-finals exit, before reaching the final of the Málaga Open where they weren't able to defeat Agustín Tapia and Sanyo Gutiérrez. In the WPT summer break they competed in the Madrid P1 and in the Argentina P1, reaching the semi-finals in the first and winning the latter.

The Brazilian-Argentinian duo returned to WPT competition in the Portugal Open where they lost in the quarter-finals, a result they repeated in the next two tournaments. In the last tournament of September, the Amsterdam Open, Lima and Stupaczuk defeated Galán and Lebrón in the semi-finals but were defeated by Arturo Coello and Fernando Belasteguín in the final. Despite four consecutive quarter-final losses in WPT tournaments they were able to reach the final of the NewGiza P1, defeating Galán and Lebrón to claim their second title in Premier Padel.

After two round of 16 exits in the last two Premier Padel tournaments of the season, they competed in the Mexico Open, the last tournament of the WPT regular season, losing to Juan Tello and Paquito Navarro in the finals.

In the last tournament of the year, the Barcelona Master Final they weren't able to progress past the quarter-finals, where they lost to Galán and Lebrón. After the tournament Lima and Stupaczuk announced that they would part their ways, having competed as a team in twenty four tournaments, reaching seven finals and winning four titles.

=== 2023 ===
In his final season Lima wasn't able reach any semi-final in Premier Padel or World Padel Tour tournaments, missing most of the tournaments in the second half of the season due to injury. He played his last tournament in the Madrid Master, losing in the first round against Galán and Lebrón.

Lima ended his career having played in one hundred and thirty finals on the main padel circuits, winning sixty-seven and being the world number one for three years.

== Honours ==
=== Padel Pro Tour (2006–2012) ===
Win Loss

==== Finals ====
N.º	Year	Tournament	Category	Partner	Opponents in the final	Result	Career Title No.
1.	17 September 2006	(Spain) Mérida	Open	(Argentina) Roby Gattiker	(Argentina) Fernando Belasteguín (Spain) Juan Martín Díaz	2–6 / 0–6	
2.	5 November 2006	(Spain) Las Palmas	Open	(Argentina) Roby Gattiker	(Argentina) Fernando Belasteguín (Spain) Juan Martín Díaz	1–6 / 2–6	
3.	31 May 2009	(Spain) Majadahonda	Open	(Spain) Juani Mieres	(Argentina) Cristian Gutiérrez (Argentina) Sebastián Nerone	6–4 / 6–0	1st
4.	12 July 2009	(Spain) Alicante	Open	(Spain) Juani Mieres	(Argentina) Fernando Belasteguín (Spain) Juan Martín Díaz	2–6 / 6–7	
5.	20 July 2009	(Spain) Madrid	Open	(Spain) Juani Mieres	(Argentina) Cristian Gutiérrez (Argentina) Seba Nerone	4–6 / 3–6	
6.	20 September 2009	(Spain) San Sebastián	Open	(Spain) Juani Mieres	(Argentina) Fernando Belasteguín (Spain) Juan Martín Díaz	2–6 / 2–6	
7.	8 November 2009	(Spain) Logroño	Open	(Spain) Juani Mieres	(Argentina) Gabriel Reca (Argentina) Hernán Auguste	6–4 / 6–3	2nd
8.	29 November 2009	(Spain) Salamanca	Open	(Spain) Juani Mieres	(Argentina) Fernando Belasteguín (Spain) Juan Martín Díaz	6–4 / 7–5	3rd
9.	13 December 2009	(Spain) Madrid	Master Final	(Spain) Juani Mieres	(Argentina) Fernando Belasteguín (Spain) Juan Martín Díaz	4–6 / 2–6	
10.	14 March 2010	(Argentina) Mar del Plata	Open	(Spain) Juani Mieres	(Spain) Matías Díaz (Argentina) Miguel Lamperti	5–7 / 6–4 / 5–7	
11.	2 May 2010	(Spain) Ciudad Real	Open	(Spain) Juani Mieres	(Argentina) Gabriel Reca (Argentina) Hernán Auguste	6–3 / 7–5	4th
12.	30 May 2010	(Spain) Madrid I	Open	(Spain) Juani Mieres	(Argentina) (Argentina) Agustín Gómez Silingo; Maximiliano Grabiel	6–3 / 3–6 / 4–6	
13.	20 June 2010	(Spain) Córdoba	Open	(Spain) Juani Mieres	(Argentina) Matías Díaz (Argentina) Miguel Lamperti	6–7 / 6–2 / 6–2	5th
14.	4 July 2010	(Spain) Valladolid	Open	(Spain) Juani Mieres	(Argentina) Gabriel Reca (Argentina) Hernán Auguste	6–3 / 6–2	6th
15.	18 July 2010	(Spain) Madrid II	Open	(Spain) Juani Mieres	(Argentina) Fernando Belasteguín (Spain) Juan Martín Díaz	5–7 / 2–6	
16.	25 July 2010	(Spain) Benicasim	Open	(Spain) Juani Mieres	(Argentina) Fernando Belasteguín (Spain) Juan Martín Díaz	3–6 / 5–7	
17.	8 August 2010	(Spain) Fuengirola	Open	(Spain) Juani Mieres	(Argentina) Fernando Belasteguín (Spain) Juan Martín Díaz	3–6 / 4–6	
18.	19 September 2010	(Spain) Sevilla	Open	(Spain) Juani Mieres	(Argentina) Fernando Belasteguín (Spain) Juan Martín Díaz	6–2 / 6–3	7th
19.	26 September 2010	(Spain) Navarra	Open	(Spain) Juani Mieres	(Argentina) Fernando Belasteguín (Spain) Juan Martín Díaz	4–6 / 7–6 / 1–6	
20.	3 October 2010	(Spain) Bilbao	Open	(Spain) Juani Mieres	(Argentina) Fernando Belasteguín (Spain) Juan Martín Díaz	3–6 / 4–6	
21.	24 October 2010	(Spain) Murcia	Open	(Spain) Juani Mieres	(Argentina) Fernando Belasteguín (Spain) Juan Martín Díaz	6–3 / 4–6 / 4–6	
22.	7 November 2010	(Spain) Logroño	Open	(Spain) Juani Mieres	(Argentina) Fernando Belasteguín (Spain) Juan Martín Díaz	6–7 / 7–6 / 3–6	
23.	19 December 2010	(Spain) Madrid	Master Final	(Spain) Juani Mieres	(Argentina) Fernando Belasteguín (Spain) Juan Martín Díaz	3–6 / 4–6	
24.	3 April 2011	(Argentina) Mendoza	Open	(Spain) Juani Mieres	(Argentina) Fernando Belasteguín (Spain) Juan Martín Díaz	6–2 / 7–6	8th
25.	15 May 2011	(Spain) Tarragona	Open	(Spain) Juani Mieres	(Argentina) Cristian Gutiérrez (Argentina) Miguel Lamperti	6–2 / 6–3	9th
26.	5 June 2011	(Spain) Barcelona	Open	(Spain) Juani Mieres	(Argentina) Fernando Belasteguín (Spain) Juan Martín Díaz	4–6 / 3–6	
27.	10 July 2011	(Spain) Alicante	Open	(Spain) Juani Mieres	(Argentina) Fernando Belasteguín (Spain) Juan Martín Díaz	1–6 / 1–6	
28.	31 July 2011	(Spain) Marbella	Open	(Spain) Juani Mieres	(Argentina) Fernando Belasteguín (Spain) Juan Martín Díaz	6–4 / 6–7 / 3–6	
29.	2 October 2011	(Spain) Madrid II	Open	(Spain) Juani Mieres	(Argentina) Fernando Belasteguín (Spain) Juan Martín Díaz	4–6 / 6–7	
30.	9 October 2011	(Spain) Bilbao	Open	(Spain) Juani Mieres	(Argentina) Fernando Belasteguín (Spain) Juan Martín Díaz	4–6 / 4–6	
31.	27 November 2011	(Spain) Valencia	Open	(Spain) Juani Mieres	(Argentina) Maxi Grabiel (Argentina) Fernando Poggi	5–7 / 6–2 / 6–0	10th
32.	6 November 2011	(Spain) Logroño	Open	(Spain) Juani Mieres	(Argentina) Fernando Belasteguín (Spain) Juan Martín Díaz	6–7 / 4–6	
33.	13 November 2011	(Spain) Vitoria	Open	(Spain) Juani Mieres	(Argentina) Fernando Belasteguín (Spain) Juan Martín Díaz	6–7 / 5–7	
34.	18 December 2011	(Spain) Madrid	PPT Master Final	(Spain) Juani Mieres	(Argentina) Fernando Belasteguín (Spain) Juan Martín Díaz	3–6 / 3–6	
35.	26 February 2012	(Argentina) Buenos Aires	Open	(Spain) Juani Mieres	(Argentina) Fernando Belasteguín (Spain) Juan Martín Díaz	4–6 / 3–6	
36.	10 June 2012	(Spain) Barcelona	Open	(Spain) Juani Mieres	(Argentina) Fernando Belasteguín (Spain) Juan Martín Díaz	2–6 / 3–6	
37.	17 June 2012	(Spain) Córdoba	Open	(Spain) Juani Mieres	(Argentina) Fernando Belasteguín (Spain) Juan Martín Díaz	4–6 / 6–7	
38.	15 July 2012	(Spain) Alicante	Open	(Spain) Juani Mieres	(Argentina) Sanyo Gutiérrez (Argentina) Seba Nerone	6–7 4–6	
39.	29 July 2012	(Spain) Marbella	Open	(Spain) Juani Mieres	(Argentina) Maxi Grabiel (Argentina) Miguel Lamperti	4–6 / 6–3 / 6–1	11th
40.	5 August 2012	(Spain) Fuengirola	Open	(Spain) Juani Mieres	(Argentina) Fernando Belasteguín (Spain) Juan Martín Díaz	5–7 / 6–7	
41.	2 September 2012	(Spain) Palma de Mallorca	Open	(Spain) Juani Mieres	(Argentina) Fernando Belasteguín (Spain) Juan Martín Díaz	3–6 / 4–6	
42.	9 September 2012	(Spain) Ibiza	Open	(Spain) Juani Mieres	(Argentina) Fernando Belasteguín (Spain) Juan Martín Díaz	6–2 / 3–6 / 4–6	
43.	16 September 2012	(Mexico) Acapulco	Open	(Spain) Juani Mieres	(Argentina) Agustín Gómez Silingo (Argentina) Gabriel Reca	6–1 / 4–0 / WO	12th
44.	7 October 2012	(Spain) Sevilla	Open	(Spain) Juani Mieres	(Spain) Jordi Muñoz (Argentina) Maxi Sánchez	6–3 / 6–3	13th
45.	18 November 2012	(Spain) Bilbao	Open	(Argentina) Hernán Auguste	(Argentina) Sanyo Gutiérrez (Argentina) Seba Nerone	3–6 / 3–6	
46.	2 December 2012	(Spain) Logroño	Open	(Argentina) Hernán Auguste	(Argentina) Sanyo Gutiérrez (Argentina) Seba Nerone	3–6 / 4–6	
47.	2 December 2012	(Spain) Madrid	PPT Masters Madrid	(Spain) Juani Mieres	(Argentina) Sanyo Gutiérrez (Argentina) Sebastián Nerone	6–4 / 6–4	14th

=== World Padel Tour (2013–2023) ===
Win Loss

==== Finals ====
N.º	Year	Tournament	Category	Partner	Opponents in the final	Result	Career Title No.
48.	14 April 2013	(Spain) Murcia	Open	(Spain) Juani Mieres	(Argentina) Fernando Belasteguín (Spain) Juan Martín Díaz	3–6 / 7–6 / 3–6	
49.	12 May 2013	(Spain) Sevilla	Open	(Spain) Juani Mieres	(Argentina) Fernando Belasteguín (Spain) Juan Martín Díaz	6–4 / 6–7 / 4–6 / 3–6	
50.	9 June 2013	(Spain) Barcelona	Open	(Spain) Juani Mieres	(Argentina) Fernando Belasteguín (Spain) Juan Martín Díaz	1–6 / 4–6 / 6–4 / 3–6	
51.	23 June 2013	(Spain) Madrid	Open	(Spain) Juani Mieres	(Argentina) Fernando Belasteguín (Spain) Juan Martín Díaz	6–7 / 6–0 / 7–6 / 6–4	15th
52.	30 June 2013	(Spain) La Coruña	Open	(Spain) Juani Mieres	(Argentina) Cristian Gutiérrez (Spain) Matías Díaz	7–6 / 6–7 / 6–1 / 3–6 / 3–6	
53.	7 July 2013	(Spain) Santander	Open	(Spain) Juani Mieres	(Argentina) Cristian Gutiérrez (Spain) Matías Díaz	6–7 / 1–6 / 5–7	
54.	21 July 2013	(Spain) El Puerto de Santa María	Open	(Spain) Juani Mieres	(Argentina) Cristian Gutiérrez (Argentina) Matías Díaz	6–3 / 6–2 / 6–3	16th
55.	4 August 2013	(Spain) Málaga	Open	(Spain) Juani Mieres	(Argentina) Fernando Belasteguín (Spain) Juan Martín Díaz	4–6 / 4–6 / 4–6	
56.	18 August 2013	(Spain) Benicassim	Open	(Spain) Juani Mieres	(Argentina) Fernando Belasteguín (Spain) Juan Martín Díaz	5–7 / 1–6 / 6–4 / 4–6	
57.	15 September 2013	(Spain) Bilbao	Open	(Spain) Juani Mieres	(Argentina) Fernando Belasteguín (Spain) Juan Martín Díaz	6–4 / 3–6 / 5–7 / 2–6	
58.	29 September 2013	(Spain) Granada	Open	(Spain) Juani Mieres	(Argentina) Fernando Belasteguín (Spain) Juan Martín Díaz	6–7 / 4–6 / 3–6	
59.	13 October 2013	(Portugal) Lisboa	Open	(Spain) Juani Mieres	(Argentina) Fernando Belasteguín (Spain) Juan Martín Díaz	3–6 / 6–2 / 3–6 / 4–6	
60.	27 October 2013	(Spain) Las Palmas	Open	(Spain) Juani Mieres	(Argentina) Maxi Grabiel (Argentina) Miguel Lamperti	6–4 / 6–2 / 6–2	17th
61.	1 December 2013	(Argentina) Villa Carlos Paz	Open	(Spain) Juani Mieres	(Argentina) Cristian Gutiérrez (Argentina) Matías Díaz	6–7 / 6–1 / 6–2 / WO	18th
62.	25 May 2014	(Spain) Barcelona	Open	(Spain) Juani Mieres	(Argentina) Fernando Belasteguín (Spain) Juan Martín Díaz	3–6 / 6–4 / 2–6 / 3–6	
63.	15 June 2014	(Spain) Badajoz	Open	(Spain) Juani Mieres	(Argentina) Fernando Belasteguín (Spain) Juan Martín Díaz	4–6 / 3–6 / 2–6	
64.	29 June 2014	(Spain) Córdoba	Open	(Spain) Juani Mieres	(Argentina) Fernando Belasteguín (Spain) Juan Martín Díaz	2–6 / 7–6 / 3–6 / 3–6	
65.	13 July 2014	(Spain) Castellón	Open	(Spain) Juani Mieres	(Argentina) Fernando Belasteguín (Spain) Juan Martín Díaz	2–6 / 6–3 / 6–3 / 6–3	19th
66.	27 July 2014	(Spain) Málaga	Open	(Spain) Juani Mieres	(Argentina) Maxi Sánchez (Argentina) Sanyo Gutiérrez	6–4 / 4–6 / 2–6 / 4–6	
67.	24 August 2014	(Spain) Alicante	Open	(Spain) Juani Mieres	(Argentina) Fernando Belasteguín (Spain) Juan Martín Díaz	2–6 / 7–5 / 7–6 / 4–6 / 7–5	20th
68.	19 October 2014	(Spain) San Cristóbal de la Laguna	Open	(Spain) Juani Mieres	(Spain) Juan Martín Díaz (Argentina) Fernando Belasteguín	4–6 / 6–1 / 2–6	
69.	7 June 2015	(Argentina) Río Gallegos	Open	(Argentina) Fernando Belasteguín	(Argentina) Maxi Sánchez (Argentina) Sanyo Gutiérrez	5–7 / 6–2 / 6–2	21st
70.	21 June 2015	(Spain) Valladolid	Open	(Argentina) Fernando Belasteguín	(Spain) Matías Díaz (Spain) Paquito Navarro	7–6 / 6–7 / 7–6	22nd
71.	19 July 2015	(Spain) Palma de Mallorca	Open	(Argentina) Fernando Belasteguín	(Argentina) Maxi Sánchez (Spain) Juan Martín Díaz	6–4 / 6–0	23rd
72.	2 August 2015	(Spain) Málaga	Master	(Argentina) Fernando Belasteguín	(Argentina) Maxi Sánchez (Spain) Juan Martín Díaz	7–6 / 6–3	24th
73.	23 August 2015	(Spain) La Nucia	Open	(Argentina) Fernando Belasteguín	(Argentina) Maxi Sánchez (Spain) Juan Martín Díaz	7–6 / 7–6	25th
74.	13 September 2015	Monaco	Master	(Argentina) Fernando Belasteguín	(Spain) Paquito Navarro (Spain) Matías Díaz	6–3 / 6–1	26th
75.	4 October 2015	(Spain) Seville	Open	(Argentina) Fernando Belasteguín	(Argentina) Sanyo Gutiérrez (Spain) Juani Mieres	6–2 / 6–0	27th
76.	18 October 2015	(Spain) Villagarcía de Arosa	Open	(Argentina) Fernando Belasteguín	(Argentina) Maxi Sánchez (Spain) Juan Martín Díaz	6–4 / 6–4	28th
77.	31 October 2015	(United Arab Emirates) Dubai	Master	(Argentina) Fernando Belasteguín	(Argentina) Sanyo Gutiérrez (Spain) Juani Mieres	6–1 / 6–2	29th
78.	8 November 2015	(Spain) San Sebastián	Open	(Argentina) Fernando Belasteguín	(Argentina) Sanyo Gutiérrez (Spain) Juani Mieres	7–5 / 6–4	30th
79.	29 November 2015	(Spain) Valencia	Open	(Argentina) Fernando Belasteguín	(Argentina) Miguel Lamperti (Argentina) Adrián Allemandi	6–2 / 6–1	31st
80	3 April 2016	(Spain) Gijón	Open	(Argentina) Fernando Belasteguín	(Argentina) Maxi Sánchez (Spain) Matías Díaz	6–1 / 6–4	32nd
81	8 May 2016	(Spain) Barcelona	Master	(Argentina) Fernando Belasteguín	(Argentina) Cristian Gutiérrez (Spain) Juan Martín Díaz	6–2 / 6–3	33rd
82	29 May 2016	(Spain) Las Rozas de Madrid	Open	(Argentina) Fernando Belasteguín	(Spain) Paquito Navarro (Argentina) Sanyo Gutiérrez	6–1 / 6–2	34th
83	26 June 2016	(Spain) Palma de Mallorca	Open	(Argentina) Fernando Belasteguín	(Argentina) Cristian Gutiérrez (Spain) Juan Martín Díaz	7–6 / WO	35th
84	10 July 2016	(Spain) Valladolid	Open	(Argentina) Fernando Belasteguín	(Spain) Paquito Navarro (Argentina) Sanyo Gutiérrez	7–6 / 7–5	36th
85	31 July 2016	(Spain) Gran Canaria	Open	(Argentina) Fernando Belasteguín	(Spain) Paquito Navarro (Argentina) Sanyo Gutiérrez	6–0 / 6–4	37th
86	28 August 2016	(Spain) La Nucia	Open	(Argentina) Fernando Belasteguín	(Argentina) Sanyo Gutiérrez (Spain) Paquito Navarro	WO	
87	11 September 2016	(Monaco) Monte Carlo	Master	(Argentina) Fernando Belasteguín	(Argentina) Maxi Sánchez (Spain) Matías Díaz	6–3 / 6–2	38th
88	25 September 2016	(Spain) Seville	Open	(Argentina) Fernando Belasteguín	(Spain) Paquito Navarro (Argentina) Sanyo Gutiérrez	6–4 / 6–2	39th
89	16 October 2016	(Spain) La Coruña	Open	(Argentina) Fernando Belasteguín	(Spain) Paquito Navarro (Argentina) Sanyo Gutiérrez	6–7 / 6–4 / 6–3	40th
90	30 October 2016	(Spain) Zaragoza	Open	(Argentina) Fernando Belasteguín	(Argentina) Maxi Sánchez (Spain) Matías Díaz	6–1 / 6–2	41st
91	13 November 2016	(Argentina) Buenos Aires	Master	(Argentina) Fernando Belasteguín	(Spain) Paquito Navarro (Argentina) Sanyo Gutiérrez	6–3 / 6–7 / 6–3	42nd
92	4 December 2016	(Spain) San Sebastián	Open	(Argentina) Fernando Belasteguín	(Spain) Paquito Navarro (Argentina) Sanyo Gutiérrez	6–2 / 6–4	43rd
93	2 April 2017	(Spain) Santander	Open	(Argentina) Fernando Belasteguín	(Argentina) Sanyo Gutiérrez (Spain) Paquito Navarro	6–4 / 4–6 / 6–7	
94	30 April 2017	(United States) Miami	Master	(Argentina) Fernando Belasteguín	(Argentina) Sanyo Gutiérrez (Spain) Paquito Navarro	6–7 / 3–6	
95	14 May 2017	(Spain) La Coruña	Open	(Argentina) Fernando Belasteguín	(Spain) Paquito Navarro (Argentina) Sanyo Gutiérrez	7–5 / 6–3	44th
96	4 June 2017	(Spain) Barcelona	Master	(Argentina) Fernando Belasteguín	(Spain) Paquito Navarro (Argentina) Sanyo Gutiérrez	6–3 / 6–1	45th
97	25 June 2017	(Spain) Valladolid	Open	(Argentina) Fernando Belasteguín	(Argentina) Sanyo Gutiérrez (Spain) Paquito Navarro	WO	
98	27 August 2017	(Spain) Alicante	Open	(Argentina) Fernando Belasteguín	(Spain) Paquito Navarro (Argentina) Sanyo Gutiérrez	6–3 / 3–6 / 6–3	46th
99	10 September 2017	(Spain) Seville	Open	(Argentina) Fernando Belasteguín	(Argentina) Sanyo Gutiérrez (Spain) Paquito Navarro	4–6 / 2–6	
100	24 September 2017	(Portugal) Lisbon	Master	(Argentina) Fernando Belasteguín	(Spain) Paquito Navarro (Argentina) Sanyo Gutiérrez	6–2 / 1–6 / 6–1	47th
101	1 October 2017	Andorra	Open	(Argentina) Fernando Belasteguín	(Argentina) Sanyo Gutiérrez (Spain) Paquito Navarro	6–3 / 4–6 / 4–6	
102	15 October 2017	(Spain) Granada	Open	(Argentina) Fernando Belasteguín	(Spain) Paquito Navarro (Argentina) Sanyo Gutiérrez	7–6 / 6–1	48th
103	29 October 2017	(Spain) Zaragoza	Open	(Argentina) Fernando Belasteguín	(Argentina) Maxi Sánchez (Spain) Matías Díaz	6–4 / 6–2	49th
104	12 November 2017	(Argentina) Buenos Aires	Master	(Argentina) Fernando Belasteguín	(Spain) Paquito Navarro (Argentina) Sanyo Gutiérrez	6–1 / 7–6	50th
105	26 November 2017	(Spain) Bilbao	Open	(Argentina) Fernando Belasteguín	(Spain) Matías Díaz (Argentina) Maxi Sánchez	6–7 / 6–4 / 1–6	
106	17 December 2017	(Spain) Madrid Master Final	Master Final	(Argentina) Fernando Belasteguín	(Argentina) Maxi Sánchez (Spain) Matías Díaz	6–3 / 6–2	51st
107	8 April 2018	(Spain) Alicante	Open	(Argentina) Fernando Belasteguín	(Argentina) Cristian Gutiérrez (Argentina) Franco Stupaczuk	7–6 / 3–0 / WO	52nd
108	8 July 2018	(Spain) Valencia	Master	(Argentina) Fernando Belasteguín	(Argentina) Maxi Sánchez (Argentina) Sanyo Gutiérrez	6–0 / 6–2	53rd
109	29 July 2018	(Sweden) Bastad	Open	(Argentina) Fernando Belasteguín	(Spain) Paquito Navarro (Spain) Juan Martín Díaz	6–2 / 3–6 / 6–3	54th
110	29 July 2018	(Spain) Bilbao	Open	(Spain) Paquito Navarro	(Spain) Juani Mieres (Argentina) Miguel Lamperti	6–3 / 6–3	55th
111	29 July 2018	(Spain) Murcia	Open	(Spain) Paquito Navarro	(Argentina) Maxi Sánchez (Argentina) Sanyo Gutiérrez	6–2 / 5–7 / 3–6	
112	16 December 2018	(Spain) Madrid	Master Final	(Argentina) Fernando Belasteguín	(Argentina) Maxi Sánchez (Argentina) Sanyo Gutiérrez	7–6 / 6–3	56th
113	28 April 2019	(Spain) Alicante	Open	(Argentina) Fernando Belasteguín	(Spain) Juan Lebrón (Spain) Paquito Navarro	6–3 / 6–7 / 2–6	—
114	9 June 2019	(Argentina) Buenos Aires	Master	(Argentina) Fernando Belasteguín	(Spain) Juani Mieres (Spain) Alejandro Galán	5–5 / WO	—
115	14 July 2019	(Spain) Valencia	Open	(Spain) Alejandro Galán	(Argentina) Adrián Allemandi (Argentina) Agustín Gómez Silingo	6–7 / 7–5 / 6–3	57th
116	11 August 2019	(Spain) Mijas	Open	(Spain) Alejandro Galán	(Spain) Coki Nieto (Spain) Javier Rico	7–6 / 6–4	58th
117	22 September 2019	(Portugal) Cascais	Master	(Spain) Alejandro Galán	(Argentina) Federico Chingotto (Argentina) Juan Tello	6–4 / 6–4	59th
118	22 December 2019	(Spain) Barcelona	Master Final	(Spain) Alejandro Galán	(Argentina) Agustín Tapia (Argentina) Fernando Belasteguín	7–6 / 6–3	60th
119	8 March 2020	(Spain) Marbella	Master	(Spain) Paquito Navarro	(Spain) Alejandro Galán (Spain) Juan Lebrón	7–6 / 2–6 / 6–3	61st
120	8 March 2020	(Spain) Estrella Damm	Open	(Spain) Paquito Navarro	(Spain) Alejandro Galán (Spain) Juan Lebrón	5–7 / 3–6	
121	11 July 2021	(Spain) Marbella	Master	(Argentina) Agustín Tapia	(Spain) Alejandro Galán (Spain) Juan Lebrón	6–7 / 2–6	
122	11 July 2021	(Spain) Las Rozas	Open	(Argentina) Agustín Tapia	(Argentina) Fernando Belasteguín (Argentina) Sanyo Gutiérrez	6–1 / 6–4	62nd
123	8 August 2021	(Spain) Málaga	Open	(Argentina) Agustín Tapia	(Argentina) Martín Di Nenno (Spain) Paquito Navarro	6–2 / 7–6	63rd
124	8 May 2022	(Belgium) Brussels	Open	(Argentina) Franco Stupaczuk	(Spain) Alejandro Galán (Spain) Juan Lebrón	6–3 / 6–3	64th
125	19 June 2022	(France) Toulouse	Open	(Argentina) Franco Stupaczuk	(Spain) Alejandro Galán (Spain) Juan Lebrón	7–6 / 6–4	65th
126	24 July 2022	(Spain) Málaga	Open	(Argentina) Franco Stupaczuk	(Argentina) Agustín Tapia (Argentina) Sanyo Gutiérrez	6–7 / 4–6	
127	2 October 2022	(Netherlands) Amsterdam	Open	(Argentina) Franco Stupaczuk	(Argentina) Agustín Tapia (Argentina) Sanyo Gutiérrez	2–6 / 5–7	
128	27 November 2022	Mexico	Open	(Argentina) Franco Stupaczuk	(Argentina) Juan Tello (Spain) Paquito Navarro	6–7 / 6–1 / 5–7	

=== Premier Padel ===
Win Loss

==== Finals ====
N.º	Year	Tournament	Category	Partner	Opponents	Result	Career Title No.
129.	14 August 2022	(Argentina) Mendoza	P1	(Argentina) Franco Stupaczuk	(Spain) Arturo Coello (Argentina) Fernando Belasteguín	6–2 / 4–6 / 7–6	66th
130.	30 October 2022	(Egypt) Giza	P1	(Argentina) Franco Stupaczuk	(Spain) Alejandro Galán (Spain) Juan Lebrón	2–6 / 7–6 / 7–6	67th

== Teammates ==
Pablo Lima has played with 15 different teammates and has won titles with most of them.

- Roby Gattiker (01/2006 – 12/2007)
- Marcello Jardim (01/2008 – 12/2008)
- Juani Mieres (01/2009 – 12/2014)
- Fernando Belasteguín (01/2015 – 07/2019)
- Alejandro Galán (07/2019 – 12/2019)
- Paquito Navarro (2018, 01/2020 – 12/2020)
- Agustín Tapia (01/2021 – 09/2021)
- Javier Ruiz (09/2021 – 12/2021)
- Maxi Sanchéz (01/2022 – 04/2022)
- Franco Stupaczuk (04/2022 – 12/2022)
- Coki Nieto (01/2023 – 05/2023)
- Ivan Ramirez (05/2023 – 06/2023)
- Agustín Gómez Silingo (2018, 07/2023 – 09/2023)
