= 2021 WPT Santander Open =

World Padel Tour tournament held in Santander, Spain

- Date: 24 – 30 May
- Edition: 4th (Note: The first edition was held under the organization of the Padel Pro Tour.)
- Category: Open
- Location: Santander, Spain
- Venue: Palacio de Deportes de Santander

Champions
- Men's doubles: (Spain) Alejandro Galán (Spain) Juan Lebrón
- Women's doubles: (Argentina) Delfina Brea (Spain) Tamara Icardo

Chronology

The 2021 Santander Open (officially 2021 World Padel Tour Estrella Damm Santander Open) was the fourth tournament of the ninth season organized by World Padel Tour, the most prestigious padel circuit at the time.

In the women's category, for the first time this season, no pair from the top 4 (the seeded teams) reached the final. The first finalists were Delfina Brea and Tamara Icardo, who after eliminating the number one ranked pair, Alejandra Salazar and Gemma Triay, in the quarterfinals, defeated the fourth-ranked pair, Marta Marrero and Marta Ortega, in the semifinals. Their opponents were Patricia Llaguno and Virginia Riera, who, after eliminating the third ranked pair, Ariana Sánchez and Paula Josemaria, in the quarterfinals, eliminated the second-ranked pair, Bea González and Lucia Sainz, to reach the final. In the final, Delfina and Icardo defeated Llaguno and Riera in two sets, winning the first title of their careers.

In the men's category, the first finalists were the world number ones, Alejandro Galán and Juan Lebrón, who avenged their defeat in the previous tournament against the fourth-ranked pair, Martín Di Nenno and Paquito Navarro, in the semifinals. Their opponents were Javier Rico and Momo González, who automatically advanced to the final after the retirement of the number two ranked pair, Fernando Belasteguín and Sanyo Gutiérrez, due to Belasteguín's injury. In the final, Galán and Lebrón defeated Javi and Momo without difficulty to win their second title of the season, and their first in Santander.

== Head-to-head record between teams ranked in the top 4 during the season ==
=== Men's ===
Record	Galán–Lebrón	Belasteguín–Sanyo	Lima–Tapia	Di Nenno–Paquito
Galán–Lebrón	—	—	—	1–1
Belasteguín–Sanyo	—	—	1–0	1–0
Lima–Tapia	—	0–1	—	—
Di Nenno–Paquito	1–1	0–1	—	—

=== Women's ===
Record	Gemma–Salazar	Ariana–Josemaria	Marrero–Ortega	Bea–Lucia
Gemma–Salazar	—	1–0	—	0–1
Ariana–Josemaria	0–1	—	—	2–0
Marrero–Ortega	—	—	—	—
Bea–Lucia	1–0	0–2	—	—

== Draws ==
=== Men's Bracket ===
Round of 32
1	(Spain) Galán / (Spain) Lebrón
Bye
(Spain) J. Rico / (Argentina) R. Moyano	6	6
Q	(Spain) J. Leal / (Spain) M. Semmler	4	3
Q	(Spain) C. Fuster / (Spain) J. Sanz	4	3
(Argentina) A. Allemandi / (Spain) P. Lijó	6	6
(Spain) J. Barahona / (Spain) M. Piñeiro	1	2
5	(Argentina) Chingotto / (Argentina) J. Tello	6	6
7	(Spain) J. Ruiz / (Spain) U. Botello	6	6	4
Q	(Spain) G. Rubio / (Spain) R. Méndez	4	7	6
Q	(Spain) A. Sans / (Spain) I. Zaratiegui	1	3
(Spain) J. Garrido / (Argentina) J.C. Belluati	6	6
(Spain) I. Ramírez / (Spain) M. Yanguas	6	6
(Spain) F. Gil Morales / (Spain) S. Alba	4	3
Bye
4	(Argentina) Di Nenno / (Spain) Paquito
3	(Brazil) Lima / (Argentina) Tapia
Bye
(Spain) J.G. Diestro / (Spain) P. Fernández	6	0	1
(Spain) J. Rico / (Spain) Momo	4	6	6
(Argentina) D. Perino / (Spain) E. Moreno	6	7
(Spain) Á. Cepero / (Spain) J. Mieres	3	6
(Spain) N. Gadea / (Spain) V. Ruiz	3	1
8	(Argentina) L. Capra / (Argentina) Maxi	6	6
6	(Spain) A. Ruiz / (Argentina) Stupaczuk	6	5	6
(Argentina) A. Silingo / (Spain) M. Díaz	4	7	2
(Spain) Coki / (Spain) J.M. Díaz	2	6	1
(Spain) Coello / (Argentina) M. Lamperti	6	2	6
(Brazil) L. Bergamini / (Brazil) L. Campagnolo	7	6
(Argentina) A. Gutiérrez / (Spain) J. Martinez	5	3
Bye
2	(Argentina) Belasteguín / (Argentina) Sanyo

Round of 16
1	(Spain) Galán / (Spain) Lebrón	6	6
(Spain) J. Rico / (Argentina) R. Moyano	1	3
(Argentina) A. Allemandi / (Spain) P. Lijó	6	4	7
5	(Argentina) Chingotto / (Argentina) J. Tello	4	6	5
Q	(Spain) G. Rubio / (Spain) R. Méndez	6	2
(Spain) J. Garrido / (Argentina) J.C. Belluati	7	6
(Spain) I. Ramírez / (Spain) M. Yanguas	3	4
4	(Argentina) Di Nenno / (Spain) Paquito	6	6
3	(Brazil) Lima / (Argentina) Tapia	6	6	0
(Spain) J. Rico / (Spain) Momo	7	4	4
(Argentina) D. Perino / (Spain) E. Moreno	6	3	0
8	(Argentina) L. Capra / (Argentina) Maxi	4	6	6
6	(Spain) A. Ruiz / (Argentina) Stupaczuk	6	6
(Spain) Coello / (Argentina) M. Lamperti	2	0
(Brazil) L. Bergamini / (Brazil) L. Campagnolo	5	6
2	(Argentina) Belasteguín / (Argentina) Sanyo	7	7

Quarter-Final
1	(Spain) Galán / (Spain) Lebrón	6	6
(Argentina) A. Allemandi / (Spain) P. Lijó	1	2
(Spain) J. Garrido / (Argentina) J.C. Belluati	6	1
4	(Argentina) Di Nenno / (Spain) Paquito	7	6
(Spain) J. Rico / (Spain) Momo	6	6	6
8	(Argentina) L. Capra / (Argentina) Maxi	1	7	2
6	(Spain) A. Ruiz / (Argentina) Stupaczuk	3	4
2	(Argentina) Belasteguín / (Argentina) Sanyo	6	6

Semi-Finals
1	(Spain) Galán / (Spain) Lebrón	6	7	6
4	(Argentina) Di Nenno / (Spain) Paquito	7	6	4
(Spain) J. Rico / (Spain) Momo	1	*
2	(Argentina) Belasteguín / (Argentina) Sanyo	3

Finals
1	(Spain) Galán / (Spain) Lebrón	6	6
(Spain) J. Rico / (Spain) Momo	3	2

=== Women's Bracket ===
Round of 32
1	(Spain) Gemma / (Spain) Salazar
Bye
(Spain) A. Blanco / (Spain) N. Rodríguez	6	5	2
(Spain) E. Carnicero / (Brazil) R. Piltcher	2	7	6
(Argentina) D. Brea / (Spain) T. Icardo	6	6
(Portugal) A.C. Nogueira / (Spain) T. Navarro	2	3
(Argentina) N. Brito / (Spain) N. Traviesa	6	4	2
7	(Spain) E. Amatriain / (Portugal) S. Araújo	4	6	6
5	(Spain) Majo / (Spain) Mapi	7	6
Q	(Spain) A. Cañellas / (France) L. Godallier	5	4
(Argentina) C. Tenorio / (Argentina) J. Bidahorria	6	6
(Spain) A. Cortiles / (Spain) A.F. de Ossó	1	4
(Spain) L. Martínez / (Spain) V. Virseda
(Spain) A. Galán / (Spain) M. Villalba	*
Bye
4	(Spain) M. Marrero / (Spain) M. Ortega
3	(Spain) Ariana / (Spain) P. Josemaria
Bye
(Spain) I. Domínguez / (Spain) L. Alonso	4	7	7
Q	(Spain) J. Bautista / (Spain) S. Pujals	6	5	6
(Spain) L. Rufo / (Spain) M. Talavan	6	6
Q	(Spain) P. Martínez / (Spain) S. Ruiz	2	1
(Spain) A. Martínez / (Spain) S. Hernández	0	6	0
6	(Spain) P. Llaguno / (Argentina) V. Riera	6	4	6
8	(Argentina) A. Osoro / (Spain) V. Iglesias	6	7
(France) A. Collombon / (Spain) J. Castelló	4	6
(Spain) B. Las Heras / (Spain) C. Mesa	6	7
(Spain) B. Caldera / (Spain) C. Goenaga	3	5
Q	(Argentina) C. Jensen / (Spain) S. Bellver	7	4	7
(Spain) C. Navarro / (Argentina) C. Reiter	6	6	6
Bye
2	(Spain) Bea González / (Spain) L. Sainz

Round of 16
1	(Spain) Gemma / (Spain) Salazar	6	6
(Spain) E. Carnicero / (Brazil) R. Piltcher	3	2
(Argentina) D. Brea / (Spain) T. Icardo	6	6
7	(Spain) E. Amatriain / (Portugal) S. Araújo	1	2
5	(Spain) Majo / (Spain) Mapi	6	6
(Argentina) C. Tenorio / (Argentina) J. Bidahorria	4	3
(Spain) A. Galán / (Spain) M. Villalba	2	4
4	(Spain) M. Marrero / (Spain) M. Ortega	6	6
3	(Spain) Ariana / (Spain) P. Josemaria	6	6
(Spain) I. Domínguez / (Spain) L. Alonso	3	2
(Spain) L. Rufo / (Spain) M. Talavan	0	2
6	(Spain) P. Llaguno / (Argentina) V. Riera	6	6
8	(Argentina) A. Osoro / (Spain) V. Iglesias	7	6	5
(Spain) B. Las Heras / (Spain) C. Mesa	6	7	7
(Argentina) C. Jensen / (Spain) S. Bellver	1	1
2	(Spain) Bea González / (Spain) L. Sainz	6	6

Quarter-Final
1	(Spain) Gemma / (Spain) Salazar	4	6
(Argentina) D. Brea / (Spain) T. Icardo	6	7
5	(Spain) Majo / (Spain) Mapi	4	6
4	(Spain) M. Marrero / (Spain) M. Ortega	6	7
3	(Spain) Ariana / (Spain) P. Josemaria	5	4
6	(Spain) P. Llaguno / (Argentina) V. Riera	7	6
(Spain) B. Las Heras / (Spain) C. Mesa	3	1
2	(Spain) Bea González / (Spain) L. Sainz	6	6

Semi-Finals
(Argentina) D. Brea / (Spain) T. Icardo	6	6
4	(Spain) M. Marrero / (Spain) M. Ortega	3	3
6	(Spain) P. Llaguno / (Argentina) V. Riera	7	4	6
2	(Spain) Bea González / (Spain) L. Sainz	5	6	4

Finals
(Argentina) D. Brea / (Spain) T. Icardo	6	7
6	(Spain) P. Llaguno / (Argentina) V. Riera	1	5

== Results ==
=== Round of 32 ===
Men's
Date	Winners	Score	Opponent	Ref.
26/5/2021	(Spain) José Rico (Argentina) Ramiro Moyano	6–4 / 6–3	(Spain) Javi Leal (Spain) Miguel Semmler	
26/5/2021	(Argentina) Adrián Allemandi (Spain) Pablo Lijó	6–4 / 6–3	(Spain) Christian Fuster (Spain) Jon Sanz	
26/5/2021	(Argentina) Federico Chingotto (Argentina) Juan Tello	6–1 / 6–2	(Spain) Javier Barahona (Spain) Martin Sánchez Piñeiro	
26/5/2021	(Spain) Gonzalo Rubio (Spain) Rafael Méndez	4–6 / 7–6 / 6–4	(Spain) Javier Ruiz (Spain) Uri Botello	
26/5/2021	(Spain) Javi Garrido (Argentina) Juan Cruz Belluati	6–1 / 6–3	(Spain) Anton Sans (Spain) Iñigo Zaratiegui	
26/5/2021	(Spain) Iván Ramírez (Spain) Mike Yanguas	6–4 / 6–3	(Spain) Francisco Gil Morales (Spain) Sergio Alba	
26/5/2021	(Spain) Javier Rico (Spain) Momo González	4–6 / 6–0 / 6–1	(Spain) José García Diestro (Spain) Pincho Fernández	
26/5/2021	(Argentina) Denis Perino (Spain) Ernesto Moreno	6–3 / 7–6	(Spain) Álvaro Cepero (Spain) Juani Mieres	
26/5/2021	(Argentina) Lucho Capra (Argentina) Maxi Sánchez	6–3 / 6–1	(Spain) Nacho Gadea (Spain) Víctor Ruiz	
26/5/2021	(Spain) Alejandro Ruiz (Argentina) Franco Stupaczuk	6–4 / 5–7 / 6–2	(Argentina) Agustin Gomez Silingo (Spain) Matías Díaz	
26/5/2021	(Spain) Arturo Coello (Argentina) Miguel Lamperti	6–2 / 2–6 / 6–1	(Spain) Coki Nieto (Spain) Juan Martín Díaz	
26/5/2021	(Brazil) Lucas Bergamini (Brazil) Lucas Campagnolo	7–5 / 6–3	(Argentina) Agustín Gutiérrez (Spain) Javier Martinez Vázquez	

Women's
Date	Winners	Score	Opponent	Ref.
26/5/2021	(Spain) Esther Carnicero (Brazil) Raquel Piltcher	2–6 / 7–5 / 6–2	(Spain) Alicia Blanco Rojo (Spain) Nuria Rodríguez	
26/5/2021	(Argentina) Delfina Brea (Spain) Tamara Icardo	6–2 / 6–3	(Portugal) Ana Catarina Nogueira (Spain) Teresa Navarro	
26/5/2021	(Spain) Elisabeth Amatriain (Portugal) Sofia Araújo	4–6 / 6–4 / 6–2	(Argentina) Nela Brito (Spain) Nicole Traviesa	
26/5/2021	(Spain) Majo Sánchez (Spain) Mapi Sánchez	7–5 / 6–4	(Spain) Ariadna Cañellas (France) Lea Godallier	
26/5/2021	(Argentina) Catalina Tenorio (Argentina) Julieta Bidahorria	6–1 / 6–4	(Spain) Anna Cortiles (Spain) Ana Fernández de Ossó	
26/5/2021	(Spain) Alba Galán (Spain) Maria Villalba	W.O.	(Spain) Lucía Martínez (Spain) Verónica Virseda	
26/5/2021	(Spain) Isabel Domínguez (Spain) Lorena Alonso	4–6 / 7–5 / 7–6	(Spain) Julia Polo Bautista (Spain) Sara Pujals	
26/5/2021	(Spain) Lorena Rufo (Spain) Marta Talavan	6–2 / 6–1	(Spain) Patricia Martínez (Spain) Sara Ruiz	
26/5/2021	(Spain) Patricia Llaguno (Argentina) Virginia Riera	6–0 / 4–6 / 6–0	(Spain) Araceli Martínez (Spain) Sandra Hernández	
26/5/2021	(Argentina) Aranzazu Osoro (Spain) Victoria Iglesias	6–4 / 7–6	(France) Alix Collombon (Spain) Jessica Castelló	
26/5/2021	(Spain) Barbara Las Heras (Spain) Carla Mesa	6–3 / 7–5	(Spain) Beatriz Caldera (Spain) Carmen Goenaga	
26/5/2021	(Argentina) Claudia Jensen (Spain) Sandra Bellver	7–6 / 4–6 / 7–6	(Spain) Carolina Navarro (Argentina) Cecilia Reiter	

=== Round of 16 ===
Men's
Date	Winners	Score	Opponent	Ref.
27/5/2021	(Spain) Alejandro Galán (Spain) Juan Lebrón	6–1 / 6–3	(Spain) José Rico (Argentina) Ramiro Moyano	
27/5/2021	(Argentina) Adrián Allemandi (Spain) Pablo Lijó	6–4 / 4–6 / 7–5	(Argentina) Federico Chingotto (Argentina) Juan Tello	
27/5/2021	(Spain) Javi Garrido (Argentina) Juan Cruz Belluati	7–6 / 6–2	(Spain) Gonzalo Rubio (Spain) Rafael Méndez	
27/5/2021	(Argentina) Martin Di Nenno (Spain) Paquito Navarro	6–3 / 6–4	(Spain) Iván Ramírez (Spain) Mike Yanguas	
27/5/2021	(Spain) Javier Rico (Spain) Momo González	7–6 / 4–6 / 4–0 / W.O.	(Argentina) Agustín Tapia (Brazil) Pablo Lima	
27/5/2021	(Argentina) Lucho Capra (Argentina) Maxi Sánchez	4–6 / 6–3 / 6–0	(Argentina) Denis Perino (Spain) Ernesto Moreno	
27/5/2021	(Spain) Alejandro Ruiz (Argentina) Franco Stupaczuk	6–2 / 6–0	(Spain) Arturo Coello (Argentina) Miguel Lamperti	
27/5/2021	(Argentina) Fernando Belasteguín (Argentina) Sanyo Gutiérrez	7–5 / 7–6	(Brazil) Lucas Bergamini (Brazil) Lucas Campagnolo	

Women's
Date	Winners	Score	Opponent	Ref.
27/5/2021	(Spain) Alejandra Salazar (Spain) Gemma Triay	6–3 / 6–2	(Spain) Esther Carnicero (Brazil) Raquel Piltcher	
27/5/2021	(Argentina) Delfina Brea (Spain) Tamara Icardo	6–1 / 6–2	(Spain) Elisabeth Amatriain (Portugal) Sofia Araújo	
27/5/2021	(Spain) Majo Sánchez (Spain) Mapi Sánchez	6–4 / 6–3	(Argentina) Catalina Tenorio (Argentina) Julieta Bidahorria	
27/5/2021	(Spain) Marta Marrero (Spain) Marta Ortega	6–2 / 6–4	(Spain) Alba Galán (Spain) Maria Villalba	
27/5/2021	(Spain) Ariana Sánchez (Spain) Paula Josemaria	6–3 / 6–2	(Spain) Isabel Domínguez (Spain) Lorena Alonso	
27/5/2021	(Spain) Patricia Llaguno (Argentina) Virginia Riera	6–0 / 6–2	(Spain) Lorena Rufo (Spain) Marta Talavan	
27/5/2021	(Spain) Barbara Las Heras (Spain) Carla Mesa	6–7 / 7–6 / 7–5	(Argentina) Aranzazu Osoro (Spain) Victoria Iglesias	
27/5/2021	(Spain) Bea González (Spain) Lucía Sainz	6–1 / 6–1	(Argentina) Claudia Jensen (Spain) Sandra Bellver	

=== Quarter-Finals ===
Men's
Date	Winners	Score	Opponent	Ref.
28/5/2021	(Spain) Alejandro Galán (Spain) Juan Lebrón	6–1 / 6–2	(Argentina) Adrián Allemandi (Spain) Pablo Lijó	
28/5/2021	(Argentina) Martin Di Nenno (Spain) Paquito Navarro	7–6 / 6–1	(Spain) Javi Garrido (Argentina) Juan Cruz Belluati	
28/5/2021	(Spain) Javier Rico (Spain) Momo González	6–1 / 6–7 / 6–2	(Argentina) Lucho Capra (Argentina) Maxi Sánchez	
28/5/2021	(Argentina) Fernando Belasteguín (Argentina) Sanyo Gutiérrez	6–3 / 6–4	(Spain) Alejandro Ruiz (Argentina) Franco Stupaczuk	

Women's
Date	Winners	Score	Opponent	Ref.
28/5/2021	(Argentina) Delfina Brea (Spain) Tamara Icardo	6–4 / 7–6	(Spain) Alejandra Salazar (Spain) Gemma Triay	
28/5/2021	(Spain) Marta Marrero (Spain) Marta Ortega	6–4 / 7–6	(Spain) Majo Sánchez (Spain) Mapi Sánchez	
28/5/2021	(Spain) Patricia Llaguno (Argentina) Virginia Riera	7–5 / 6–4	(Spain) Ariana Sánchez (Spain) Paula Josemaria	
28/5/2021	(Spain) Bea González (Spain) Lucía Sainz	6–3 / 6–1	(Spain) Barbara Las Heras (Spain) Carla Mesa	

=== Semi-Finals ===
Men's
Date	Winners	Score	Opponent	Ref.
29/5/2021	(Spain) Alejandro Galán (Spain) Juan Lebrón	6–7 / 7–6 / 6–4	(Argentina) Martin Di Nenno (Spain) Paquito Navarro	
29/5/2021	(Spain) Javier Rico (Spain) Momo González	1–3 / W.O.	(Argentina) Fernando Belasteguín (Argentina) Sanyo Gutiérrez	

Women's
Date	Winners	Score	Opponent	Ref.
29/5/2021	(Argentina) Delfina Brea (Spain) Tamara Icardo	6–3 / 6–3	(Spain) Marta Marrero (Spain) Marta Ortega	
29/5/2021	(Spain) Patricia Llaguno (Argentina) Virginia Riera	7–5 / 4–6 / 6–4	(Spain) Bea González (Spain) Lucía Sainz	

=== Finals ===
Men's
Date	Winners	Score	Opponent	Ref.
30/5/2021	(Spain) Alejandro Galán (Spain) Juan Lebrón	6–3 / 6–2	(Spain) Javier Rico (Spain) Momo González	

Women's
Date	Winners	Score	Opponent	Ref.
30/5/2021	(Argentina) Delfina Brea (Spain) Tamara Icardo	6–1 / 7–5	(Spain) Patricia Llaguno (Argentina) Virginia Riera	
