= 2023 Ooredoo Qatar Major =

Padel championships

- Date: 26 February – 5 March
- Edition: 2nd
- Category: Major
- Prize money: € 525,000
- Location: Ooredoo, Qatar
- Venue: Khalifa Complex

Champions
- Men's doubles: (Argentina) Franco Stupaczuk (Argentina) Martin Di Nenno

Chronology
Previous
Master Final (WPT)
Next
Abu Dhabi Master (WPT)

The 2023 Ooredoo Qatar Major was the first tournament of the second season organized by Premier Padel, promoted by the International Padel Federation, and with the financial backing of Nasser Al-Khelaïfi's Qatar Sports Investments.

In the finals FIP number 2 ranked team Franco Stupaczuk and Martin Di Nenno faced and defeated FIP number 4 ranked team Fernando Belasteguín and Sanyo Gutiérrez, after the favorites Alejandro Galán and Juan Lebrón and Agustín Tapia and Arturo Coello where surprisingly eliminating, winning their first title as team in the circuit.

== Seeds ==
1. (Spain) Alejandro Galán / (Spain) Juan Lebrón (quarter-finals)
2. (Argentina) Franco Stupaczuk / (Argentina) Martin Di Nenno (winners)
3. (Argentina) Juan Tello / (Spain) Paquito Navarro (round of 16)
4. (Argentina) Fernando Belasteguín / (Argentina) Sanyo Gutiérrez (final)
5. (Argentina) Agustín Tapia / (Spain) Arturo Coello (semi-finals)
6. (Argentina) Federico Chingotto / (Spain) Javier Garrido (quarter-finals)
7. (Spain) Aléx Ruiz / (Spain) Jerónimo González (semi-finals)
8. (Spain) Coki Nieto / (Brazil) Pablo Lima (quarter-finals)

== Draw ==
Round of 32
1	(Spain) Galán / (Spain) Lebrón	6	6
(Sweden) D. Windahl / (Spain) J. Marmolejo	3	3
(Spain) M. Semmler / (Spain) P. Lijó	6	4
13	(Spain) A. Arroyo / (Spain) Yanguas	7	6
10	(Brazil) L. Bergamini / (Spain) V. Ruiz	6	6
(Spain) F. Guerrero / (Spain) J. Moya	3	1
(Spain) R.M. Duran / (Spain) J. Serrano	0	1
7	(Spain) Ruíz/ (Spain) Momo	6	6
8	(Spain) Coki / (Brazil) Lima	6	6
(Spain) M. del Castillo / (Spain) M. Benítez	1	0
(Spain) I. Vilariño / (Spain) J. Muñoz	1	3
15	(Spain) J. Leal / (Spain) J. Sanz	6	6
11	(Argentina) A. Gutierrez / (Argentina) L. Capra	6	6
(Spain) A. Ayats / (Spain) A. Cépero	4	2
(Spain) J. Fermosell / (Spain) J. Casas	0	0
4	(Argentina) Belasteguín / (Argentina) Sanyo	4	2
3	(Argentina) Juan Tello / (Spain) Paquito	6	6	6
(Spain) I. Ramirez / (Spain) P. Cardona	7	0	3
(Spain) E. Alonso / (Spain) J. Esbri	5	2
9	(Brazil) L. Campagnolo / (Argentina) Maxi	7	6
12	(Spain) F. Gil / (Argentina) R. Moyano	6	4	6
(Spain) J.G. Diestro / (Spain) P. Fernandéz	4	6	3
(Spain) I. Jofre / (Spain) L.H. Quesada	2	0
5	(Spain) Coello / (Argentina) Tapia	6	6
6	(Argentina) Chingotto / (Spain) J. Garrido	3	*
(Spain) J. Rico / (Spain) J. Ruiz	0
(Spain) J. Martinez / (Spain) R. Mendez	7	3	6
14	(Spain) G. Rubio / (Spain) J. Ruiz	5	6	2
Q	(Spain) M.S. Piñeiro / (Spain) P.G. Rodrigo	6	0
(Spain) E. Goenaga / (Spain) J. Bautista	7	6
(Spain) A. Sans / (Spain) T. Zapata	2	3
2	(Argentina) F. Stupaczuk / (Argentina) Di Nenno	6	6

Round of 16
1	(Spain) Galán / (Spain) Lebrón	6	7
13	(Spain) A. Arroyo / (Spain) Yanguas	2	5
10	(Brazil) L. Bergamini / (Spain) V. Ruiz	6	2
7	(Spain) A. Ruíz / (Spain) Momo	7	6
8	(Spain) Coki / (Brazil) Lima	7	6
15	(Spain) J. Leal / (Spain) J. Sanz	6	2
11	(Argentina) A. Gutiérrez / (Argentina) L. Capra	5	5
4	(Argentina) Belasteguín / (Argentina) Sanyo	7	7
3	(Argentina) Tello / (Spain) Paquito	3	5
9	(Brazil) L. Campagnolo / (Argentina) Maxi	6	7
12	(Spain) F. Gil / (Argentina) R. Moyano	2	3
5	(Spain) Coello / (Argentina) Tapia	6	6
6	(Argentina) Chingotto / (Spain) J. Garrido	6	6
(Spain) J. Martinez / (Spain) R. Mendez	3	0
(Spain) E. Goenaga / (Spain) J. Bautista	0	3
2	(Argentina) Stupaczuk/ (Argentina) Di Nenno	6	6

Quarterfinals
1	(Spain) Galán / (Spain) Lebrón	4	6
7	(Spain) A. Ruíz / (Spain) Momo	6	7
8	(Spain) Coki / (Brazil) Lima	6	3	4
4	(Argentina) Belasteguín / (Argentina) Sanyo	1	6	6
9	(Brazil) L. Campagnolo / (Argentina) Maxi	4	3
5	(Spain) Coello / (Argentina) Tapia	6	6
6	(Argentina) Chingotto / (Spain) J. Garrido	6	4
2	(Argentina) F. Stupaczuk / (Argentina) Di Nenno	7	6

Semifinals
7	(Spain) A. Ruíz / (Spain) Momo	4	6	4
4	(Argentina) Belasteguín / (Argentina) Sanyo	6	1	6
5	(Spain) Coello / (Argentina) Tapia	7	3	2
2	(Argentina) F. Stupaczuk / (Argentina) Di Nenno	5	6	6

Final
4	(Argentina) Belasteguín / (Argentina) Sanyo	2	6
2	(Argentina) F. Stupaczuk / (Argentina) Di Nenno	6	7

== Results ==
=== First Round ===
Date	Winners	Score	Opponent	Refs.
28/2/2023	(Sweden) Daniel Windahl (Spain) Jose Solano Marmolejo	7–5 / 6–4	(Argentina) Federico Mouriño (Spain) Victor Mena Gil	
28/2/2023	(Spain) Miguel Semmler (Spain) Pablo Lijó	6–3 / 6–4	(Spain) Antonio Luque (Spain) Jose Luis Gonzalez	
28/2/2023	(Spain) Alejandro Arroyo (Spain) Mike Yanguas	6–3 / 6–3	(Spain) Alonso Rodriguez Martinez (Argentina) Cristian German Gutiérrez	
28/2/2023	(Brazil) Lucas Bergamini (Spain) Victor Ruiz	3–6 / 6–2 / 6–3	(Argentina) Agustin Gómez Silingo (Spain) Juan Martín Díaz	
28/2/2023	(Spain) Francisco Guerrero (Spain) Jesus Moya	6–1 / 6–2	(Qatar) Ali Al Saygh (Qatar) Rayyan Al Jufairi	
28/2/2023	(Spain) Joseda Sanchez Serrano (Spain) Raúl Marcos Duran	6–4 / 4–6 / 6–4	(Spain) Cayetano Rocafort (Spain) Manuel Rocafort	
28/2/2023	(Spain) Mario Del Castillo (Spain) Miguel Benítez	7–5 / 6–1	(Spain) Adriá Mercadal (Spain) Ruben Rivera	
28/2/2023	(Spain) Ignacio Vilariño (Spain) Jaime Muñoz	6–3 / 6–2	(France) Benjamin Tison (Spain) Mario Huete	
28/2/2023	(Spain) Javi Leal (Spain) Jon Sanz	6–2 / 6–1	(Spain) Diego Gil Batista (Spain) Miguel Solbes	
28/2/2023	(Argentina) Agustin Gutierrez (Argentina) Lucho Capra	6–3 / 7–6	(Spain) Jose Rico (Spain) Salvador Oria	
28/2/2023	(Spain) Arnau Ayats (Spain) Alvaro Cépero	6–2 / 6–3	(Spain) Alvaro Melendez Amaya (Spain) Pedro Melendez Amaya	
28/2/2023	(Spain) Jaime Fermosell (Spain) José Jimenez Casas	1–6 / 7–5 / 6–4	(Italy) Denis Perino (Spain) Sergio Alba	
28/2/2023	(Spain) Iván Ramirez (Spain) Pablo Cardona	6–1 / 6–0	(Qatar) Khalid Saadon Al-Kuwari (Qatar) Mohammed Abdulla	
28/2/2023	(Spain) Eduardo Alonso (Spain) Juanlu Esbri	6–0 / 6–0	(Qatar) Jabor Al Mutawa (Qatar) Mohammed Al Khanji	
28/2/2023	(Brazil) Lucas Campagnolo (Argentina) Maxi Sánchez	6–2 / 5–7 / 7–6	(Spain) Marc Quilez (Spain) Toni Bueno	
28/2/2023	(Spain) Francisco Gil Morales (Argentina) Ramiro Moyano	6–4 / 6–3	(Spain) Fran Ramirez (Spain) Ricardo Martinez Sanchez	
28/2/2023	(Spain) Jose Garcia Diestro (Spain) Pincho Fernandéz	6–2 / 6–4	(Spain) Javier Gonzalez Barahona (Spain) Javier García Mora	
28/2/2023	(Spain) Iñigo Jofre (Spain) Luis Hernandez Quesada	6–3 / 7–5	(Italy) Aris Patiniotis (Spain) Ignacio Sager	
28/2/2023	(Spain) Javi Rico (Spain) Jorge Ruiz	6–3 / 6–4	(Argentina) Facundo Domínguez (Chile) Javier Valdes	
28/2/2023	(Spain) Javier Martinez (Spain) Rafael Mendez	7–6 / 7–5	(France) Maxime Moreau (Italy) Riccardo Sinicropi	
28/2/2023	(Spain) Gonzalo Rubio (Spain) Javier Ruiz Gonzalez	6–0 / 6–1	(Qatar) Abdulla Alhijji (Qatar) Mohammed Saadon Alkuwari	
28/2/2023	(Spain) Martin Sanchez Piñeiro (Spain) Pablo García Rodrigo	6–2 / 7–6	(Argentina) Juan Cruz Belluati (Argentina) Miguel Lamperti	
28/2/2023	(Spain) Enrique Goenaga (Spain) Jairo Bautista	6–0 / 6–2	(Spain) Carlos Marti (Spain) Mario Ortega	
28/2/2023	(Spain) Anton Sans (Spain) Teodoro Zapata	6–3 / 6–2	(Spain) Aday Santana (Argentina) Nicolás Suescun	

=== Round of 32 ===
Date	Winners	Score	Opponent	Refs.
1/3/2023	(Spain) Alejandro Galán (Spain) Juan Lebrón	6–3 / 6–3	(Sweden) Daniel Windahl (Spain) Jose Solano Marmolejo	
1/3/2023	(Spain) Alejandro Arroyo (Spain) Mike Yanguas	7–6 / 6–4	(Spain) Miguel Semmler (Spain) Pablo Lijó	
1/3/2023	(Brazil) Lucas Bergamini (Spain) Victor Ruiz	6–3 / 6–1	(Spain) Francisco Guerrero (Spain) Jesus Moya	
1/3/2023	(Spain) Alex Ruiz (Spain) Momo Gonzalez	6–0 / 6–1	(Spain) Joseda Sanchez Serrano (Spain) Raúl Marcos Duran	
1/3/2023	(Spain) Coki Nieto (Brazil) Pablo Lima	6–1 / 6–0	(Spain) Mario Del Castillo (Spain) Miguel Benítez	
1/3/2023	(Spain) Javi Leal (Spain) Jon Sanz	6–1 / 6–3	(Spain) Ignacio Vilariño (Spain) Jaime Muñoz	
1/3/2023	(Argentina) Agustin Gutierrez (Argentina) Lucho Capra	6–4 / 6–2	(Spain) Arnau Ayats (Spain) Alvaro Cépero	
1/3/2023	(Argentina) Fernando Belasteguín (Argentina) Sanyo Gutiérrez	6–0 / 6–0	(Spain) Jaime Fermosell (Spain) José Jimenez Casas	
1/3/2023	(Argentina) Juan Tello (Spain) Paquito Navarro	6–7 / 6–0 / 6–3	(Spain) Iván Ramirez (Spain) Pablo Cardona	
1/3/2023	(Brazil) Lucas Campagnolo (Argentina) Maxi Sánchez	7–5 / 6–2	(Spain) Eduardo Alonso (Spain) Juanlu Esbri	
1/3/2023	(Spain) Francisco Gil Morales (Argentina) Ramiro Moyano	6–4 / 4–6 / 6–3	(Spain) Jose Garcia Diestro (Spain) Pincho Fernandéz	
1/3/2023	(Argentina) Agustín Tapia (Spain) Arturo Coello	6–2 / 6–0	(Spain) Iñigo Jofre (Spain) Luis Hernandez Quesada	
1/3/2023	(Argentina) Federico Chingotto (Spain) Javi Garrido	3–0 / W.O.	(Spain) Javi Rico (Spain) Jorge Ruiz	
1/3/2023	(Spain) Javier Martinez (Spain) Rafael Mendez	7–5 / 3–6 / 6–2	(Spain) Gonzalo Rubio (Spain) Javier Ruiz Gonzalez	
1/3/2023	(Spain) Enrique Goenaga (Spain) Jairo Bautista	7–6 / 6–0	(Spain) Martin Sanchez Piñeiro (Spain) Pablo García Rodrigo	
1/3/2023	(Argentina) Franco Stupaczuk (Argentina) Martin Di Nenno	6–2 / 6–3	(Spain) Anton Sans (Spain) Teodoro Zapata	

=== Round of 16 ===
Date	Winners	Score	Opponent	Refs.
2/3/2022	(Spain) Alejandro Galán (Spain) Juan Lebrón	6–2 / 7–5	(Spain) Alejandro Arroyo (Spain) Mike Yanguas	
2/3/2022	(Spain) Alex Ruiz (Spain) Momo Gonzalez	7–6 / 6–2	(Brazil) Lucas Bergamini (Spain) Victor Ruiz	
2/3/2022	(Spain) Coki Nieto (Brazil) Pablo Lima	7–6 / 6–2	(Spain) Javi Leal (Spain) Jon Sanz	
2/3/2022	(Argentina) Fernando Belasteguín (Argentina) Sanyo Gutiérrez	7–5 / 7–5	(Argentina) Agustin Gutierrez (Argentina) Lucho Capra	
2/3/2022	(Brazil) Lucas Campagnolo (Argentina) Maxi Sánchez	6–3 / 7–5	(Argentina) Juan Tello (Spain) Paquito Navarro	
2/3/2022	(Argentina) Agustín Tapia (Spain) Arturo Coello	6–2 / 6–3	(Spain) Francisco Gil Morales (Argentina) Ramiro Moyano	
2/3/2022	(Argentina) Federico Chingotto (Spain) Javi Garrido	6–3 / 6–0	(Spain) Javier Martinez (Spain) Rafael Mendez	
2/3/2022	(Argentina) Franco Stupaczuk (Argentina) Martin Di Nenno	6–0 / 6–3	(Spain) Enrique Goenaga (Spain) Jairo Bautista	

=== Quarter-Finals ===
Date	Winners	Score	Opponent	Refs.
3/3/2023	(Spain) Alex Ruiz (Spain) Momo Gonzalez	6–4 / 7–6	(Spain) Alejandro Galán (Spain) Juan Lebrón	
3/3/2023	(Argentina) Fernando Belasteguín (Argentina) Sanyo Gutiérrez	1–6 / 6–3 / 6–4	(Spain) Coki Nieto (Brazil) Pablo Lima	
3/3/2023	(Argentina) Agustín Tapia (Spain) Arturo Coello	6–4 / 6–3	(Brazil) Lucas Campagnolo (Argentina) Maxi Sánchez	
3/3/2023	(Argentina) Franco Stupaczuk (Argentina) Martin Di Nenno	7–6 / 6–4	(Argentina) Federico Chingotto (Spain) Javi Garrido	

=== Semi-Finals ===
Date	Winners	Score	Opponent	Refs.
4/3/2023	(Argentina) Fernando Belasteguín (Argentina) Sanyo Gutiérrez	6–4 / 1–6 / 6–4	(Spain) Alex Ruiz (Spain) Momo Gonzalez	
4/3/2023	(Argentina) Franco Stupaczuk (Argentina) Martin Di Nenno	5–7 / 6–3 / 6–2	(Argentina) Agustín Tapia (Spain) Arturo Coello	

=== Finals ===
Date	Winners	Score	Opponent	Refs.
5/3/2023	(Argentina) Franco Stupaczuk (Argentina) Martin Di Nenno	6–2 / 7–6	(Argentina) Fernando Belasteguín (Argentina) Sanyo Gutiérrez	

== Points distribution ==
Below is a series of tables showing the ranking points and money a player can earn.

Event	First round	Second Round	Round of 16	QF	SF	F	W
Points	40	90	180	360	750	1200	2000
Money	€1500	€2900	€5250	€8500	€13000	€23600	€47300
