= Fernando Belasteguín =

Argentine padel player

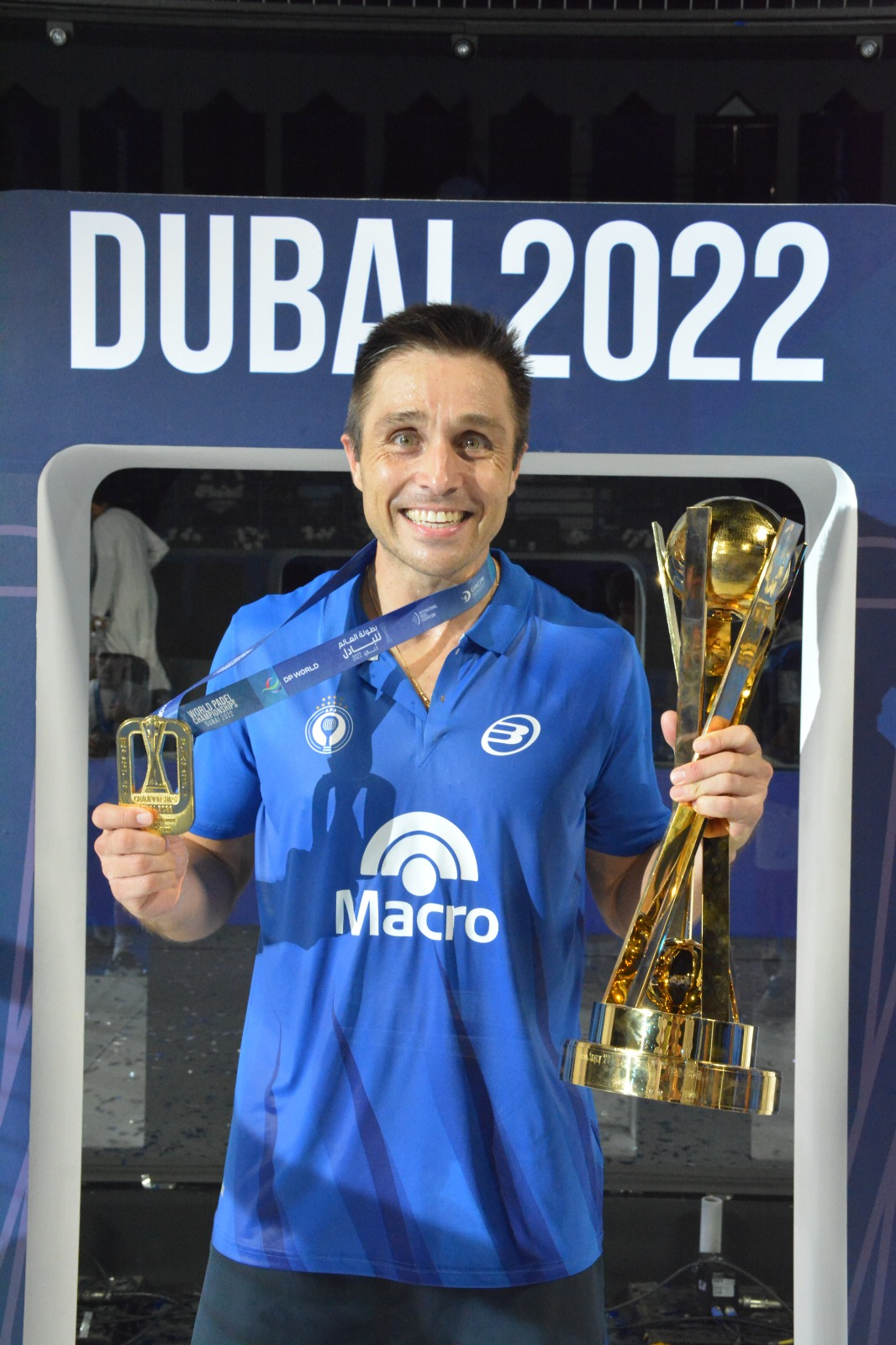

Personal information
- Nicknames: Bela; El Boss; La Leyenda de Pehuajó
- Citizenship: Argentine; Spanish
- Born: May 19, 1979 (age 47) Pehuajó, Provincia de Buenos Aires, Argentina
- Height: 1.80 m (5 ft 11 in)
- Weight: 82 kg (181 lb)

Sport
- Country: Argentina
- Sport: Pádel
- Turned pro: 1995
- Retired: 2024

Achievements and titles
- Highest world ranking: 1.º (2002 - 2017)

Fernando Belasteguín (born 19 May 1979 in Pehuajó, Buenos Aires Province, Argentina), known as Bela, is a former professional Argentine padel player widely regarded as one of the greatest padel players of all time.

At the professional level, he holds various records, including the longest period as world No. 1 (16 consecutive years) and the highest number of titles in World Padel Tour (WPT) history. During his career, he won 230 titles and appeared in 286 finals. For these achievements, many consider him the greatest padel player of all time.

Belasteguín became the youngest world No. 1 in history at age 22. Partnering with Juan Martín Díaz, together they had the most dominant run in the sport history, remaining undefeated for 1 year and 9 months and winning 22 consecutive tournaments between September 2005 and May 2007. The pair also holds the record for the longest period as the world's No. 1 ranked team, topping the rankings for 13 straight seasons (2002–2014) and winning 170 titles together. He is the only padel player to have won 11 Olimpia de Plata awards and is a six-time world champion, with titles in 2002, 2004, 2006, 2014, 2016, and 2022. He also holds the record for the most weeks ranked No. 1 in World Padel Tour history.

== Career ==
=== Early Years ===
Belasteguín began playing padel in 1990, shortly after courts were installed at the facilities of Club Atlético General in his hometown of Pehuajó, Buenos Aires. At the time, he played football for Atlético, but at age 13 he was noticed by the father of professional players Matí Díaz and Godo Díaz. Shortly after, he began training and competing with them, first partnering with Godo for one year, and then with Matías between 1994 and 1998, competing regularly in Buenos Aires.

=== Transition into professional padel and first partners ===
Belasteguín made his professional debut in 1995 at the age of 15, partnering with Matías Díaz. After a brief retirement from professional padel, in which he returned to live in Pehuajó, he received an invitation from Roby Gattiker, who alongside Alejandro Lasaigues had dominated the Spanish circuit in the previous five years. Belasteguín returned to competition to play a series of tournaments with Gattiker in 1999, including a tournament in France where they finished as runners-up and another at Club de Campo in which they reached the semifinals. In September 1999, he played a tour in Spain with Alejandro Sanz, reaching the finals of the Puerto de Santa Maria and Sotogrande tournaments.

Belasteguín returned to the Argentine professional circuit partnering with Guillermo Demianiuk, and together they established themselves as the second best pair in the country, just behind Gabriel Reca and Sebastián Nerone, who were the No.1 team in the previous two years. Belasteguín and Demianiuk also began competing regularly in tournaments across Spain in 1999, and at the age of 20 years he was recognized as the best player in Argentina. Their international breakthrough came in 2000, when they reached the final of the Madrid International tournament. Despite challenging for the No. 1 position in Argentina, neither he or his partner were selected by the national team coach to compete in the 2000 World Championship.

In 2001, he played the whole season alongside Spaniard Pablo Martínez Semprún, one of the most important Spanish players at the time, forming one of the top two pairs in the circuit and reaching various finals against Juan Martín Díaz and Hernán Auguste. Together they won titles in Badajoz, Torre Bellver, Santander, San Sebastián, and Sotogrande. They finished the season ranked second on the circuit, only behind Díaz and Auguste.

=== Partnership with Juan Martín Díaz ===
==== 2002 ====
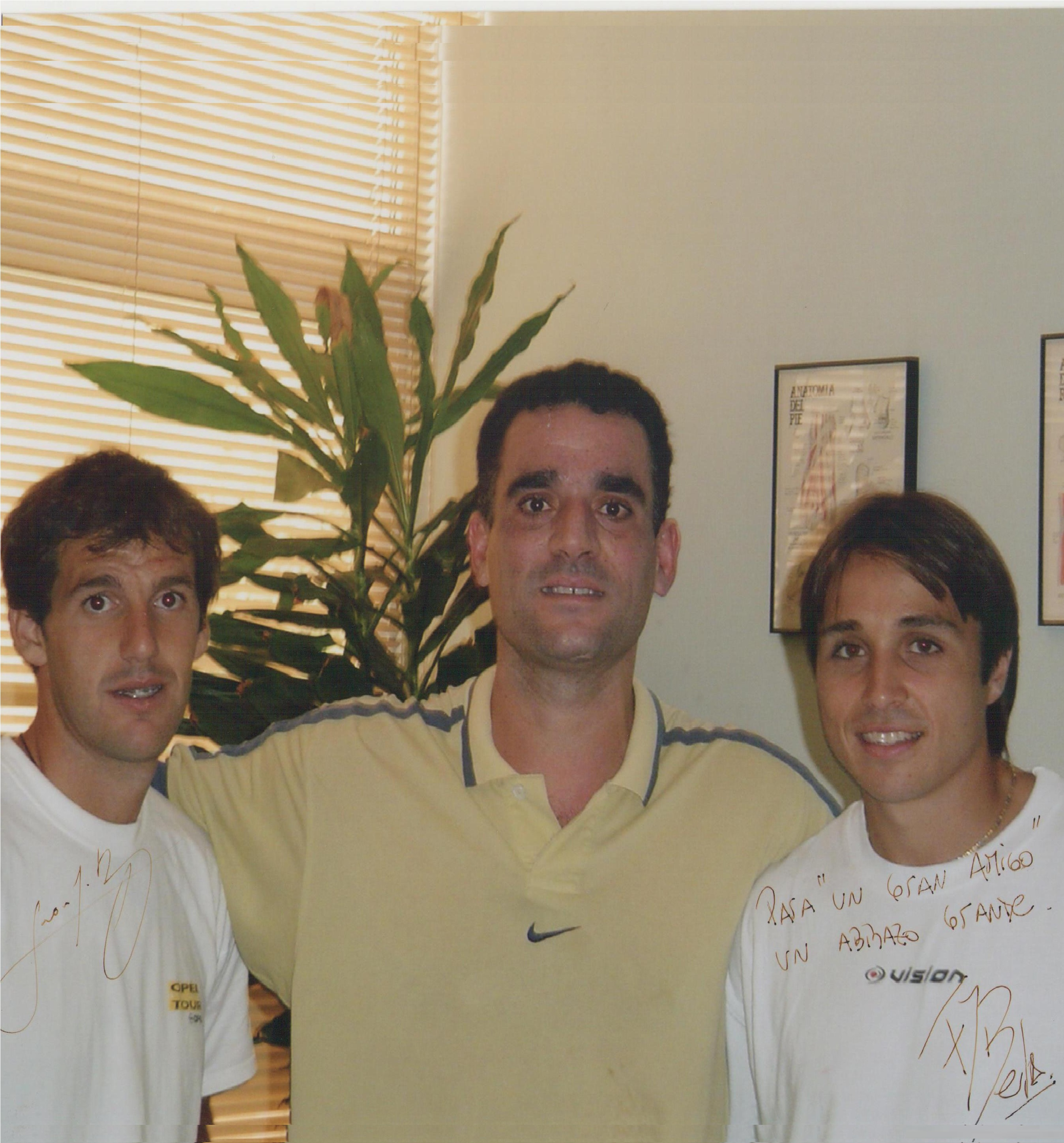
A young Belasteguín and Díaz

In 2002, he joined forces with the naturalized Spaniard Juan Martín Díaz, who was the No. 1 ranked in both international and Spanish circuits at the time with Auguste. Together they would be ranked as the No. 1 pair for 13 consecutive years, holding the unbeaten record with 1 year and 9 months without losing a match, winning 22 consecutive tournaments between September 2005 and June 2007.

In 2002, they first year together, they finished the year as the best duo in the world. They reached the final of each tournament they competed in, losing only three times, one of them against their former partners, Auguste and Semprún. They won the Bilbao, San Sebastián, Altea and Sotogrande Open's, the Torre Bellver and El Puerto de Santa María Internationals, the Santander Open and the Madrid International's, Barcelona Internationals, Bilbao II, and Seville Internationals. With these results, they finished the season as No. 1 on both Spanish and international circuits. They also won the World Doubles Championship, defeating Gaby Reca and Seba Nerone in the final. Belasteguín also competed, and won, the 2002 World Championship with the Argentina national team in Mexico, playing with his former junior partner Matías Díaz. For his achievements, he received the Olimpia de Plata, becoming the first padel player to win the award.

==== 2003 ====
In 2003, Díaz and Belasteguín dominated both national and international circuits, finishing the season as the number one ranked team in both circuits. They won the Melilla, Valladolid, Bilbao, Oropesa del Mar, Marbella, Madrid, and Seville Internationals, with their main rivals being Gaby Reca and Seba Nerone, once again. One of their few defeats came at the Real Club de Polo de Barcelona tournament, where, despite winning the first set and leading 3–1 in the second, they lost to Cristian Gutiérrez and Roby Gattiker. Their results granted another No. 1 finish on both Spanish and international circuits, which earned Belasteguín a second Olimpia de Plata.

==== 2004 ====
In 2004, Belasteguín and Díaz finished the season ranked No. 1 for a third consecutive year. They won the Bilbao, Melilla, Seville, Valladolid and Barcelona Internationals, the Cantabria Open, the Cádiz, El Puerto de Santa María, Madrid and Seville Internationals, and the Madrid Masters. Their closest rivals were once again Reca and Nerone. During the Valladolid tournament, hours before the quarter-finals, Díaz and Belasteguín traveled to Madrid for the birth of Díaz' son, but returned in time for their match. After the end of the Spanish and international circuits, Belasteguín and Díaz were crowned World Doubles champions for the second time, in Buenos Aires, defeating Reca and Nerone in the final. Belasteguín also won the 2004 World Championship, representing Argentina and teaming with Mariano Lasaigues in the final, where they won their match against Díaz and Raúl Arias without difficulty.

==== 2005 ====
In 2005, Díaz and Belasteguín won eleven of the fourteen circuit tournaments, winning the Barcelona International, the Bilbao Open, the Valencia, Lisbon and Córdoba Internationals, the Madrid Masters, the Higuerón and Torre Bellver Internationals, the Islas Baleares Masters, and the Badajoz and Bilbao Internationals. After a semifinal loss at the Madrid International in September, against Cristian Gutiérrez and Hernán Auguste, they began an unbeaten streak that lasted 1 year and 9 months, during which they won 22 consecutive titles.

=== Padel Pro Tour years ===
==== 2006 ====
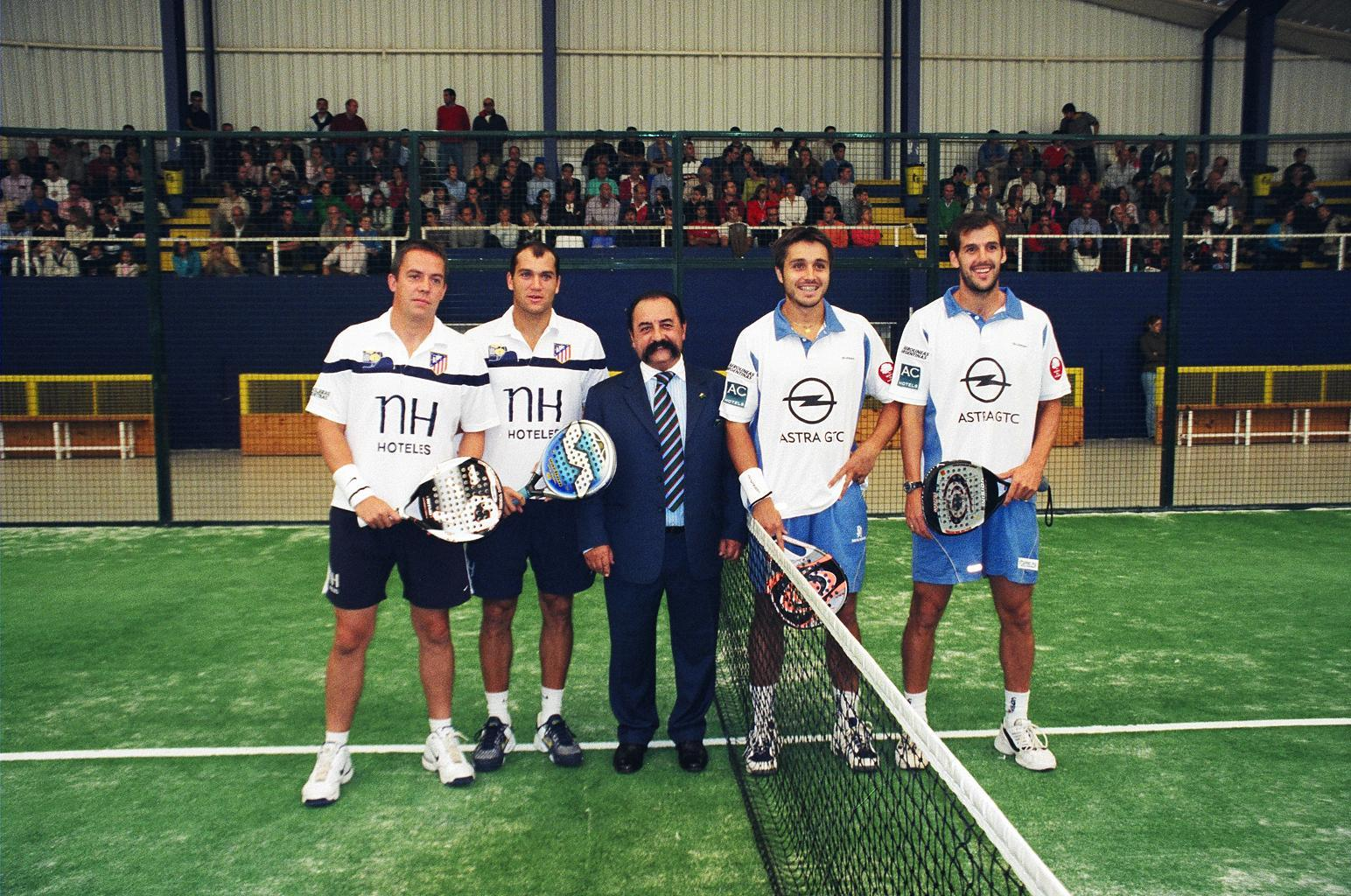
Gaby Reca and Seba Nerone (left) before facing Bela and Díaz(right

In 2006, they completed a perfect season, winning all 17 tournaments in the inaugural edition of the Padel Pro Tour (PPT), the first organized international professional padel circuit. Their closest rivals, Reca and Nerone, remained well behind. Due to disputes between the PPT, the Spanish Padel Federation, and FIP, Bela didn't participate in the World Doubles Championship that year, but did play in the 2006 World Championship, where Argentina was crowned champion again, with Bela winning his match in the final partnering with Mariano Lasaigues.

==== 2007 ====
In 2007, Belasteguín and Díaz won the Córdoba, Barcelona, Madrid, Valencia, Vitoria, Madrid II, Oropesa del Mar, Salamanca, Fuengirola, Cádiz, Palma de Mallorca, Mérida, San Sebastián, Zaragoza, Bilbao, Las Palmas, and Alicante Internationals, and the Madrid Masters. Their unbeaten streak came to an end in the fourth tournament of the season, in Valladolid, where they were defeated by Cristian Gutiérrez and Seba Nerone. During the season, they suffered only two more losses, both in semifinals against Auguste and Reca, in Seville and Logroño.

==== 2008 ====
In 2008, they extended their dominance, winning the Ciudad Real, Granada, Santander, Barcelona, Majadahonda, Logroño, Vitoria, Comunidad de Madrid, Marbella, Fuengirola, Benicasim, Mallorca, Mérida, San Sebastián, Zaragoza, and Bilbao Internationals. The Fuengirola tournament win marked their 100th title won as team, won in the same venue where they first competed together. Despite a surprising elimination in the group stage at the Madrid Masters, they finished the season as the number one ranked team for a seventh consecutive year. Belasteguín didn't compete in the 2008 World Championship nor the World Doubles Championship held in Calgary.

==== 2009 ====
The 2009 season began with two consecutive semifinal defeats, first in Granada against Matí Díaz and Miguel Lamperti, followed by a loss to Juani Mieres and Pablo Lima in Madrid. They reacted winning the Barcelona, Córdoba, Valladolid, and Alicante Internationals, but were eliminated in the quarterfinals of the Madrid International by Mieres and Lima. They won the Marbella International, but were eliminated in the next four tournaments, with losses in the Fuengirola and Islas Baleares finals, and the Castellón and Sevilla semifinals. They responded with five straight title wins in the San Sebastián, Zaragoza, Bilbao, Valencia, and Ciudad Real Internationals. They were forced to miss tournaments in La Rioja and A Coruña do to injuries, but returned in Salamanca, reaching the final but losing it to Mieres and Lima. They finished the season winning the Madrid Masters, and securing their eighth consecutive first place rank in the international circuit.

==== 2010 ====
In 2010, they missed the first two tournaments of the season due to a Belasteguín injury, with Díaz temporarily competing with Roby Gattiker. In their returning tournaments, in the Mar del Plata and Ciudad Real Internationals, Belasteguín and Díaz reached the semifinals and the quarterfinals, respectively. They won the San Sebastián International, but were eliminated in Madrid in the semifinals by the second ranked pair, Mieres and Lima. They won the next six Internationals in Barcelona, Alicante, Madrid, Castellón, Marbella, and Fuengirola. Despite an unexpected loss in the Palma de Mallorca semifinals and a defeat in the Seville final, they won four more international tournaments in Pamplona, Bilbao, Murcia, and La Rioja, and finished the season winning the Madrid Masters. They finished the season as the number one ranked team.

==== 2011 ====
In 2011, Belasteguín and Díaz started the season with a loss in the Mendoza International final, against Juani Mieres and Pablo Lima. They didn't compete in Tarragona due to Belasteguín's injury, but returned winning two consecutive titles, the Madrid and Barcelona Internationals. They were eliminated in the Córdoba International quarterfinals by Sanyo Gutiérrez and Seba Nerone, but responded winning the Valladolid, Alicante, Castellón, and Marbella Internationals. In Fuengirola, they were surprisingly defeated in the round-of-16, but rebounded winning the Gijón International. They lost in Palma de Mallorca to Nerone and Gutiérrez, but finished the season winning the Seville, Madrid, Bilbao, Logroño, and Vitoria-Gasteiz Internationals. Their final match of the year was a quarterfinal loss at the Madrid Masters against Reca and Silingo.

==== 2012 ====
The 2012 season was the most difficult for the pair so far, beginning with a loss in the final of the Mendoza International, and followed by a win in the Buenos Aires International. Belasteguín and Díaz competed in the World Doubles Championship in Barcelona, having missed the 2006, 2008, and 2010 editions due to disputes between PPT and FIP. They were eliminated in the quarterfinals by Cristian Gutiérrez and Fernando Poggi. They responded winning the Madrid, Barcelona, Córdoba, and Valladolid Internationals. A semifinal loss in Alicante against Nerone and Gutiérrez didn't affect them, as they won the next four International tournaments in Marbella, Fuengirola, Mallorca, and Ibiza. They didn't compete in Acapulco, returning in the Madrid International, and winning it. Due to a Belasteguín injury, they didn't compete in Seville and were eliminated in the quarterfinals of the Valencia International by a young Paquito Navarro. The injury also forced Belasteguín to miss tournaments in Bilbao, La Rioja, and the Madrid Masters. Despite not competing in the last three tournaments, Belasteguín and Díaz had already secured the number 1 ranking, finishing the season as the No. 1 team for the eleventh consecutive year and reaching a decade as the top pair in professional padel.

=== World Padel Tour ===
==== 2013 ====
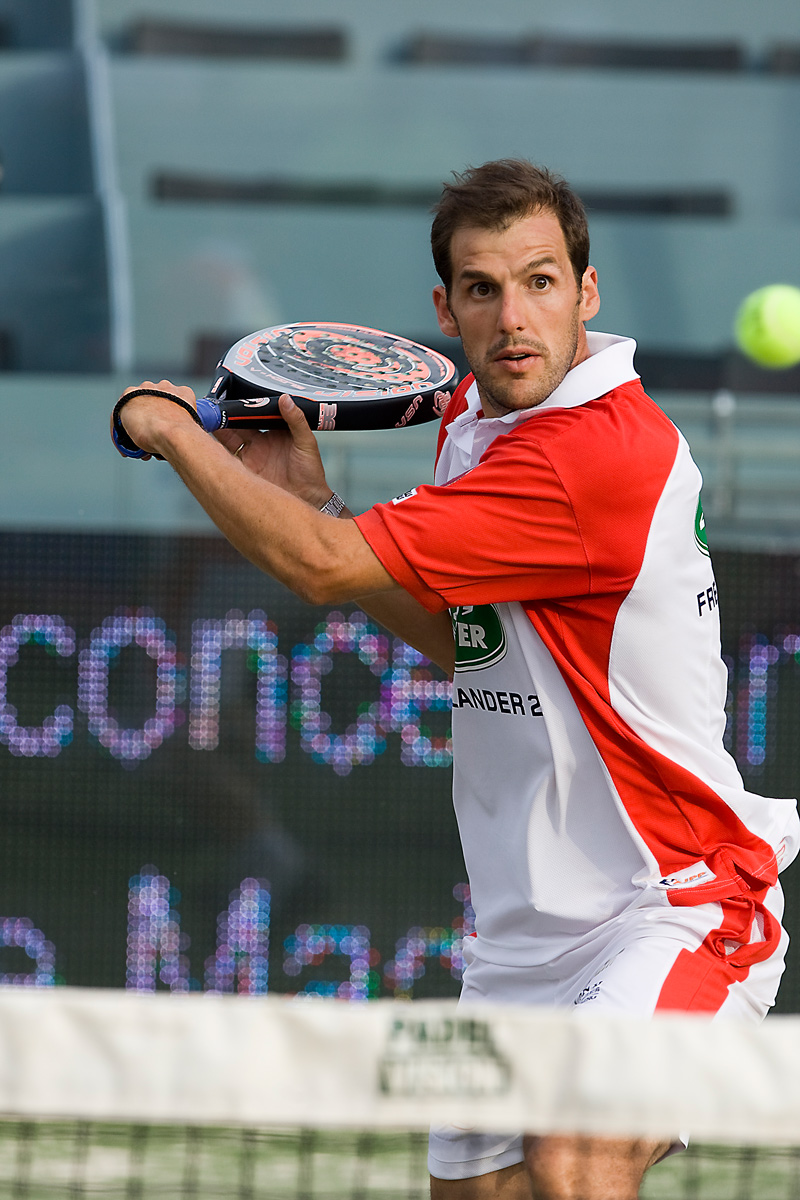
Juan Martin Díaz, who along with Bela, was number one ranked for thirteen seasons

In 2013, Belasteguín and Díaz joined the newly created World Padel Tour (WPT), an international professional circuit that aimed to expand padel on a global level. They began the season, winning the Murcia, Seville, Cáceres, and Barcelona Opens. Their first defeat of the season came in the final of the Madrid Open, in Caja Mágica, against the No.2 ranked pair, Pablo Lima and Juani Mieres. The defeat was followed by a first-round elimination in A Coruña Open. Belasteguín missed the Santander Open due to an injury, returning for the Puerto de Santa María Open and losing in the semifinals, leaving the No. 1 ranking under threat. Bela and Díaz, answered by winning the Málaga, Castellón, La Nucia, Bilbao, and Granada Opens, defeating Lima and Mieres in the last final and securing the first ranking position. In the last five tournaments of the season, they won the first in Lisbon, but were defeated in Las Palmas and Valencia, were eliminated in the quarterfinal in the Buenos Aires and Córdoba Opens, and finished the season with a semifinal loss against Lima and Mieres at the Master Finals.

==== 2014 ====
They began the season defeating Lima and Mieres in the finals of the Barcelona and Badajoz Opens. They briefly lost the No. 1 ranking for one week, but regained it winning the Córdoba Open. They finished runners-up in Castellón and were eliminated from the Málaga Open by Sanyo Gutiérrez and Maxi Sánchez. Belasteguín and Díaz won the Marbella Open, giving Belasteguín his 165th professional title. Before the Alicante Open, where they lost in the final to Lima and Mieres, Belasteguín and Díaz announced that they would part ways at the end of the season. Despite the announcement, they won four more titles in the Alcobendas, Seville, Lisbon, and Tenerife Opens. They finished runners-up in the Valencia Open, against Maxi Grabiel and Paquito Navarro and did not compete in San Fernando. Their last title came at the Córdoba Open. They played their last game together, in the Madrid Master Final, where they reached the final but were defeated by Sanyo Gutiérrez and Sánchez.

During their thirteen seasons together, Belasteguín and Díaz finished every year as the first ranked pair. They competed in 176 major finals and won 156 titles, a record that remains unmatched in professional padel.

=== Partnership with Pablo Lima ===
==== 2015 ====
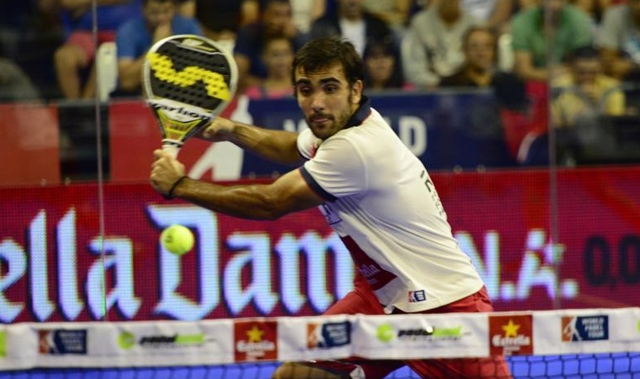
Pablo Lima, who along with Bela, was number one ranked for three years

Following the separation from Juan Martín Díaz, Belasteguín's first-choice partner for 2015 was Pablo Lima, with Sanyo Gutiérrez as a second option if Lima declined. Lima accepted the offer, ending his six-year partnership with Juani Mieres. Lima–Mieres were known as “Los Príncipes” (“The Princes”), while Belasteguín and Díaz were nicknamed “Los Reyes” (“The Kings”). Mieres subsequently partnered with Juan Martín Díaz. Belasteguín and Lima began the season in the Barcelona Open, reaching the semifinals, but were forced to withdraw due to an injury sustained by Lima. While Lima recovered, Belasteguín competed in the next two tournaments with Willy Lahoz, winning both. With Lima's return, they won their first title together in the Río Gallegos Open, beating Maxi Sánchez and Sanyo Gutiérrez in the final. After this win, they began a dominant run, winning the next five Open tournaments in Valladolid, Mallorca, Málaga, La Nucía, and Monte Carlo.

In the Mallorca, Málaga, and La Nucía finals, they defeated Sánchez and Belasteguín's former partner, Juan Martín Díaz. Their winning streak ended at the Madrid Open, where they were eliminated in the first round via walkover, due to a Belasteguín injury. They returned to competition winning five consecutive Opens, in Seville, A Coruña, Dubai, Euskadi, and Valencia. They finished the season at the Madrid Master Final, where they were forced to withdraw in the semifinals against Díaz and Sánchez, due to a Lima injury. Belasteguín finished the season as the ranked No. 1, having won 13 out of 16 tournaments, with all three defeats coming from injury withdraws.

==== 2016 ====
Lima and Bela began the new season winning the Gijón Open. During the Valencia Master, Belasteguín and Lima were eliminated in the semifinals by Paquito Navarro and Sanyo Gutiérrez, their main rivals during the 2016 and 2017 seasons. They responded winning the Barcelona Master, and the Las Rozas de Madrid, Palma de Mallorca, Valladolid, and Las Palmas Opens. In three of these five finals, they defeated Paquito and Sanyo. The winning streak ended in the La Nucía Open, where they were forced to withdraw from the final.

Belasteguín and Lima won the next four tournament finals, with three of them playing against Paquito and Sanyo. Despite not competing in the Mendoza Open due to a Belasteguín injury, they won the Buenos Aires Master and the San Sebastián Open, defeating Navarro and Gutiérrez in both finals. They concluded the season reaching the semifinals of the Master Final. With 12 out of 16 tournaments won with Pablo Lima, Belasteguín reached 15 consecutive years as the world No. 1, for which he was presented with a commemorative plaque by the World Padel Tour.

==== 2017 ====
The 2017 season started with Belasteguín and Lima losing two consecutive finals to Paquito Navarro and Sanyo Gutiérrez. They responded winning the Barcelona Master and the A Coruña Open, but were forced to withdraw from the final of the Valladolid Open due to a Belasteguín injury, which gave Navarro and Gutiérrez their third title of the season. With Belasteguín injured, they missed one more tournament, the Mijas Open, and returned to the competition in the Gran Canaria Open, losing in the quarterfinals. At the Alicante Open, Belasteguín and Lima reached the final, and avenged their defeats, beating Paquito and Sanyo to win the tournament.

At the Seville Open, the two teams faced off once again in the final. Before the final, each team had reached six finals and won three titles during the season. Navarro and Gutiérrez won the match, with Navarro lifting the trophy in his hometown. Belasteguín and Lima avenged the loss, defeating them in the Portugal Master final. They faced each other again in the Andorra Open final, which Belasteguín and Lima lost, therefore having had one less title than Paquito and Sanyo at that point of the season. After beating Navarro and Gutiérrez in the Granada Open final, both teams were tied with ten finals contested and five titles each.

With four tournaments remaining, Belasteguín and Lima won the Zaragoza Open, defeating the third-ranked pair of Matías Díaz and Maxi Sánchez. They followed up by winning the Buenos Aires Master, beating Navarro and Gutiérrez in the final and extending their advantage in the No. 1 ranking race. Despite losing the Bilbao Open, reaching the final secured them the No. 1 ranking. At the Master Final, Belasteguín and Lima avenged the previous loss to Díaz and Sánchez in the finals of the tournament, closing the season with eight out of sixteen tournaments won.

=== Injuries and final seasons with Pablo Lima ===
==== 2018 ====
Belasteguín and Lima had a difficult start of the season, in the competition to retain No.1 ranking for a fourth consecutive year. They started the season being unexpectedly being eliminated in the semifinals of the Catalonia Master by Juan Lebrón and Juan Belluati. Despite winning the Alicante Open, they failed to win any of the next three tournaments. They didn't compete in the Zaragoza Open, were eliminated in the quarter-finals of the Jaén Open, and exited in the round of 16 at the Valladolid Open.

These results allowed Sanyo Gutiérrez and Maxi Sánchez, who had won three of the first five tournaments, to threaten the No. 1 position that Belasteguín had held since 2002. Belasteguín and Lima responded winning the Valencia Master, which allowed him to distance himself in the ranking race, and winning the Båstad Open, defeating Juan Martín Díaz and Paquito Navarro in the final. During the Mijas Open, Belasteguín suffered a severe elbow injury that forced the team to withdraw from the quarter-finals. Halfway through the season, they remained ranked No. 1, though Gutiérrez and Sánchez had reached six finals and won four titles compared to Belasteguín and Lima's three finals and two titles.

The injury Belasteguín sustained in Mijas sidelined him for several months, forcing him to miss the Andorra and Lugo Opens, the Portugal Master, the Granada and Euskadi Opens, the Argentina Master, and the Murcia Open. During this period, Bela briefly considered retiring. After the Andorra Open, Lima temporarily held the No. 1 ranking alone, but after Gutiérrez and Sánchez won the Portugal Master, Sánchez assumed the No. 1 Ranking, a position which he and Sanyo would retain for the rest of the season, ending Belasteguín's 15-year reign as the world number one ranked player. While Belasteguín recovered, Lima competed with Agustín Gómez Silingo and Paquito Navarro, winning the Bilbao Open and reaching the final of the Murcia Open with the latter.

After a four-months absence, Belasteguín returned for the final tournament of the season, the 2018 Madrid Master Final, reuniting with Lima. They reached the final and defeated the new No. 1 ranked team, Sanyo and Maxi (7–6, 6–3). After the match, Belasteguín revealed that during his recovery he had considered retirement, crediting his return to a note given to him by his daughter Sofía: “A Belasteguín never gives up.”

"Fifteen days ago, I didn't know if I could play again or if I'd end up in surgery, risking it being the end. The doctor, Juan Erquicia, who's here, told me that when he saw how the injury was progressing, he thought it was going to be the end. We've worked day and night so that this tendon will at least allow me to be back on the field. I want to share this with the whole team and my family, but especially with my three children. I can assure you that children, who aren't as jaded as we adults are —we're the ones who have to raise them— are the ones who teach us so much more. One day, about a month ago, my daughter came home from school, perhaps seeing that I was feeling down, and brought me a little piece of paper. I told her I was going to put it in my bag and that I was sure it would bring me luck if I ever played again. It's something I always tell my children: that whatever happens, they should never give up. Sofi, thank you so much; a Belasteguín never gives up."

==== 2019 ====
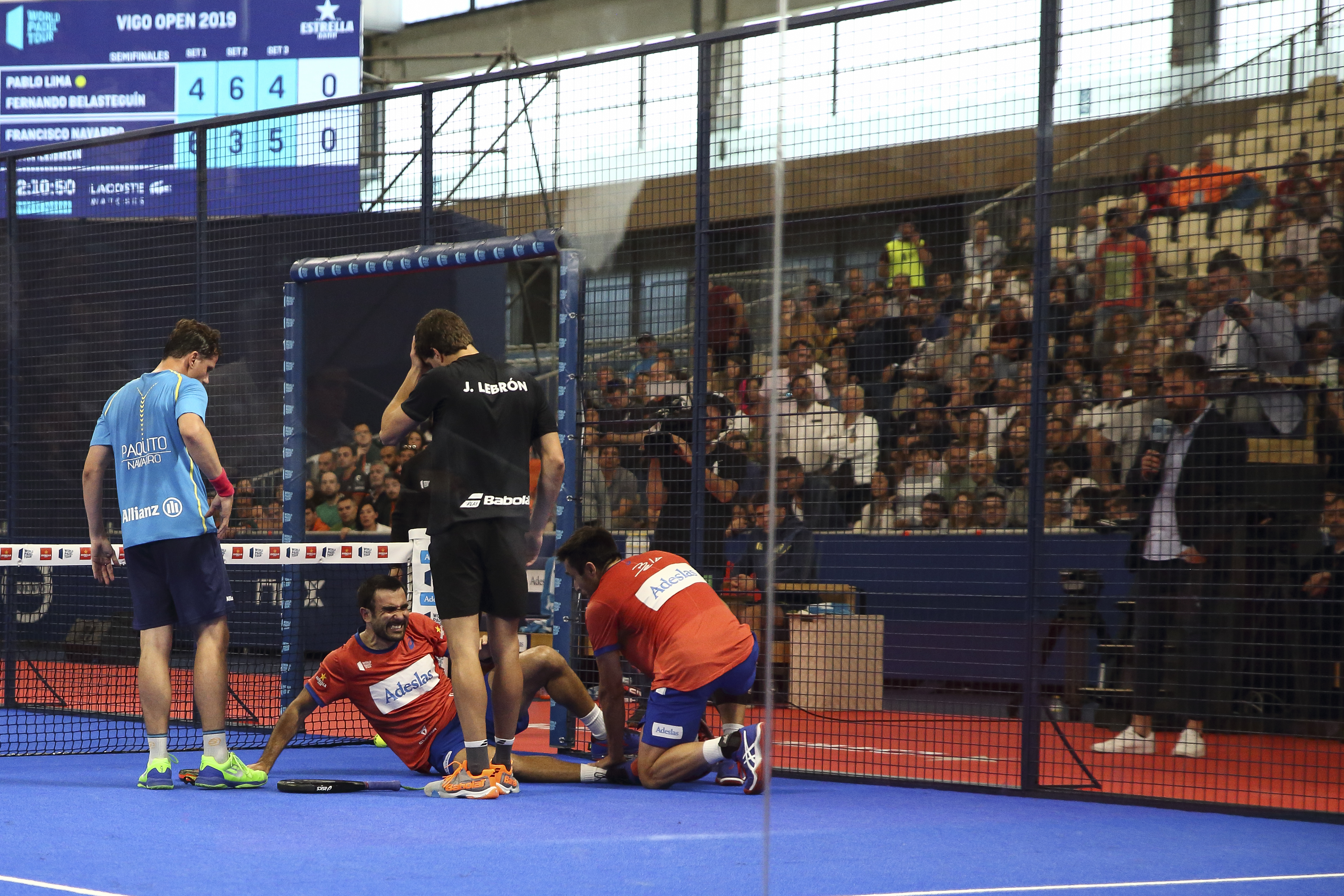
Bela and Lima in a match with Paquito and Lebrón.

In 2019, Belasteguín continued competing with Pablo Lima, aiming to reclaim the No. 1 ranking. They began the season with two semifinal losses, in the Marbella Master and the Logroño Open, losing on both occasions to Juan Lebrón and Paquito Navarro. They reached the final of the Alicante Open, but again lost to Lebrón and Paquito. They reached two more semifinals, in the Vigo and Jaén Opens, again losing to Lebrón and Navarro. Due to these results, Belasteguín opted to end the partnership, with both players agreeing to complete together at the Buenos Aires Master, Valladolid Master, and Båstad Open, before breaking up. At the Buenos Aires Master, they reached the final, where they faced Alejandro Galán and Juani Mieres. However, Belasteguín was forced to withdraw in the first set, with a 5–5 score, due to injury. The same injury caused him to miss the Valladolid, Båstad, and Valencia tournaments, making the Buenos Aires final their last match together.

Belasteguín and Lima concluded their partnership with three consecutive seasons as the top-ranked team. They played 44 finals and won 35 titles together.

=== Partnership with Agustín Tapia ===
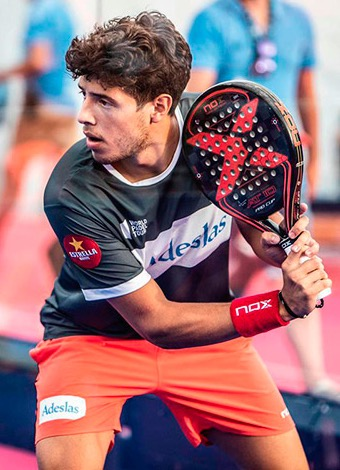
Augustin Tapia, who has partnered Belasteguín for two seasons.

After months of speculation, young prospect Agustín Tapia became Fernando Belasteguín's new partner for the second half of the season, with Belasteguín moving to the drive position (playing on right), for the first time in his professional career. The partnership had one of the largest age differences in the circuit, with a 20 years difference between the two players. They debuted in the Mijas Open, exiting in the round of 16. In their second tournament together, they surprised by winning the Madrid Open. During the tournament, they defeated the No. 2 ranked team Paquito Navarro and Juan Lebrón in the round of 16, Franco Stupaczuk and Matí Díaz in the quarterfinals, Javier Ruiz and Uri Botello in the semifinals, and defeated the No. 1 ranked Sanyo Gutiérrez and Maxi Sánchez in the final, winning their first tournament together.

They reach the next four tournaments' semifinals, but were unable to reach another final. They were defeated by Alejandro Galán and Pablo Lima in the Portugal Master, by Sanyo Gutiérrez and Maxi Sánchez in the Menorca Open, and by Paquito Navarro and Juan Lebrón at both the Córdoba and São Paulo Opens. At the Mexico Open, the last tournament before the Master Finals, they were unexpectedly eliminated in the round of 16. At the Master Finals, they defeated the new No. 1 ranked team, Lebrón and Navarro in the semifinals, but lost in the final against Galán and Lima. They ended the season ranked fourth as a pair, with Belasteguín finishing seventh in the individual ranking.

==== 2020 ====
Belasteguín and Tapia continued together in 2020, starting as the No. 5 ranked pair due to other players changing partners and forming new teams. The season was heavily affected by the COVID-19 pandemic and only had 11 tournaments. They began the new season, losing in the quarter-finals of the Marbella Master, shortly before the circuit was suspended. After a three-month hiatus, they returned to the competition at the Madrid Open, again losing in the quarterfinals. In the third tournament of the season, also in Madrid, the Argentine duo reached the final, where they lost to the No. 1 ranked team, Galán and Lebrón. They had two more quarterfinal exits in the Adeslas and Valencia Opens.

In the only international tournament of the season, the Sardinia Open, Belasteguín and Tapia won their second title together, defeating Javier Ruiz and Uri Botello in the final. In next four tournaments, they reached the final of the Menorca Open, but once again were defeated by Sanyo Gutiérrez and Franco Stupaczuk, followed by a semifinal loss in the Barcelona Master, a withdrawal from the Alicante Open due to contracting COVID-19, and a quarterfinal exit in the Las Rozas Open.

They entered the Master Finals as the No. 3 ranked team. Before their quarterfinal match, Belasteguín and Tapia announced in an emotional video that the tournament would be their last together. They went on to defeat Stupaczuk and Gutiérrez in the semifinals and then overcame the No. 1 ranked Galán and Lebrón 6–3, 7–6 in the final, which concluded with a 24-point tie-break. With the win, Belasteguín became the oldest Master Finals champion, with 41 years, while Tapia became the youngest, at 21 years.

They finished the season ranked second as a pair, with both ranked third individually.

=== Partnership with Sanyo Gutiérrez ===
==== 2021 ====
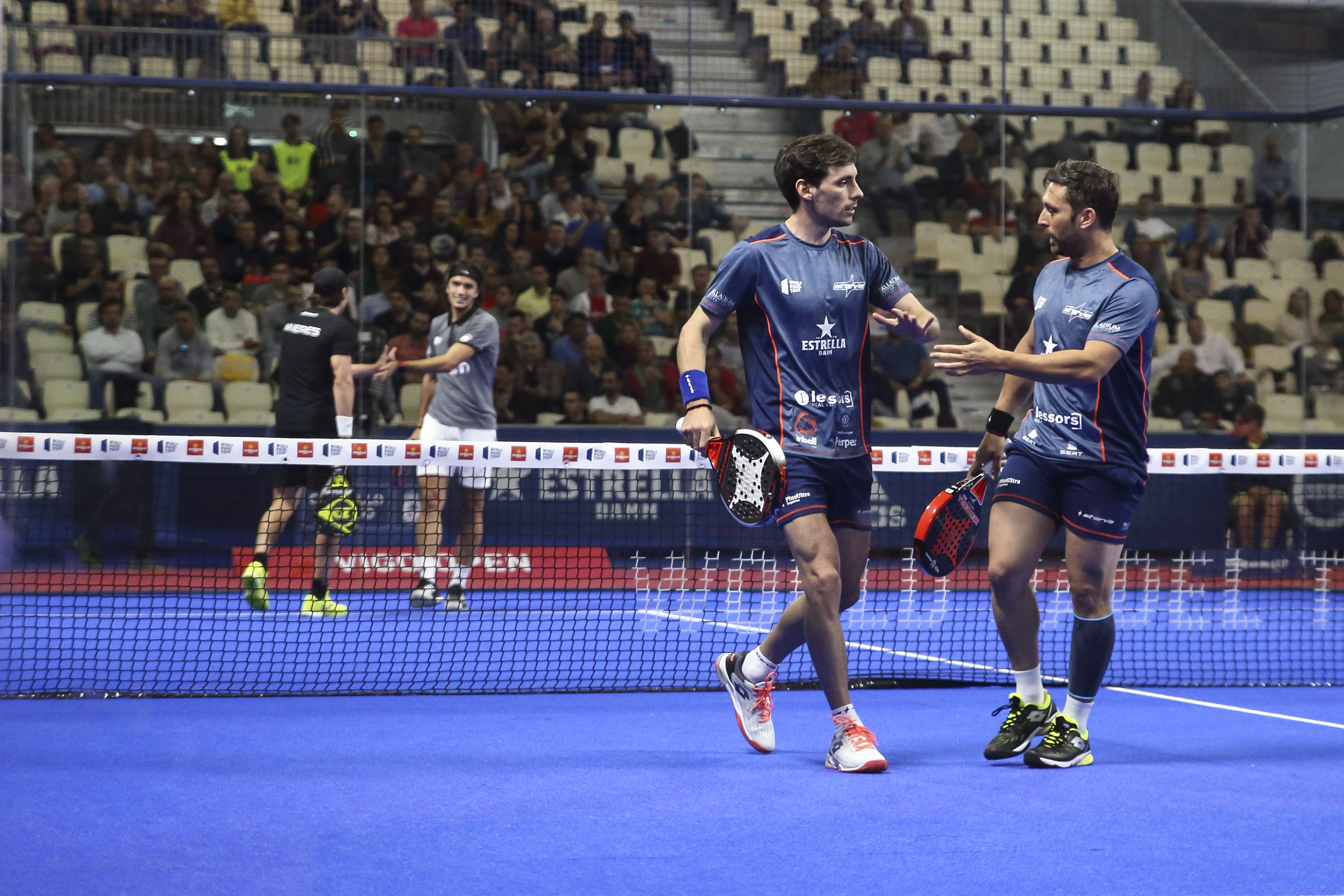
Sanyo Gutiérrez (right), who has partnered Belasteguín for two seasons.

A few days after the Master Finals, Belasteguín announced Sanyo Gutiérrez as his new partner for the 2021 season. Having failed to regain the world No. 1 ranking in the two previous seasons, Bela and Sanyo had the goal of challenging Juan Lebrón and Alejandro Galán for the first ranking spot. They made their debut at the Madrid Open, defeating Alex Ruiz and Franco Stupaczuk in a three-set final to win the tournament. At the Alicante Open, they were eliminated in a quarterfinal rematch against the same opponents, but returned in the Vigo Open, defeating Paquito Navarro and Martín Di Nenno in the final to win their second title of the season. During the Santander Open, Belasteguín suffered an injury that forced him and Sanyo to withdraw in the semifinals, causing him to also miss the Marbella Master. They returned in the Valladolid Master, but were eliminated in the semifinals by Maxi Sánchez and Lucho Capra.

At the Valencia Open, the seventh tournament of the season, Belasteguín and Gutiérrez reached the final, where they faced Lebrón and Galán, marking the first time in the season that the top two seeds met in a final. Both teams entered the match with similar results, the Spanish duo had won three tournaments and the Argentinians two. After a very contested three-set match, Belasteguín and Gutiérrez won the tournament, reducing the distance between the two teams in the ranking. They finished the first half of the season with a loss to Lima and Agustín Tapia in the Las Rozas Open final, and a quarterfinal loss at the Málaga Open.

After a one-month break, Bela and Sanyo competed in the Cascais Masters with the possibility of reaching the No. 1 race position, if they won the tournament, but were unexpectedly eliminated in the first round. The bad results continued with a round-of-16 elimination in the Sardinia Open and a quarterfinal defeat at the Barcelona Master against Navarro and Di Nenno, who went on to win the tournament and surpassed them in the race standings. Following the loss, Belasteguín informed Gutiérrez of his decision to end their partnership, making the Lugo Open their last tournament together. They were eliminated in the quarterfinals, which allowed Navarro and Di Nenno to surpass them to second place in both ranking and race. Belasteguín and Gutiérrez concluded their partnership as the third-ranked pair, and were ranked sixth and fifth individually, respectively.

=== Partnership with Arturo Coello ===
With five tournaments remaining, Belasteguín announced that Arturo Coello would be his next partner. They made their debut as the sixth-seeded team, in the Menorca Open, being eliminated in the round of 32. As a result, Belasteguín dropped to 7th place in the ranking, while Tapia and Sanyo Gutiérrez moved to 5th and 6th, respectively. In the Córdoba Open, Belasteguín and Coello faced Belasteguín's last two partners, Sanyo and Tapia, in the quarterfinals, advancing to the semifinals where they lost to Paquito Navarro and Martín Di Nenno.

They finished the season with quarterfinal exits at the Córdoba and Malmö Opens, and a round-of-16 elimination at the Mexico Open. In the Barcelona Master Finals, Belasteguín and Coello lost to Navarro and Di Nenno in the quarterfinals. Despite not winning a title and Belasteguín finishing the season ranked 9th individually, the results were satisfactying enough to continue playing together for one more season.

==== 2022 ====
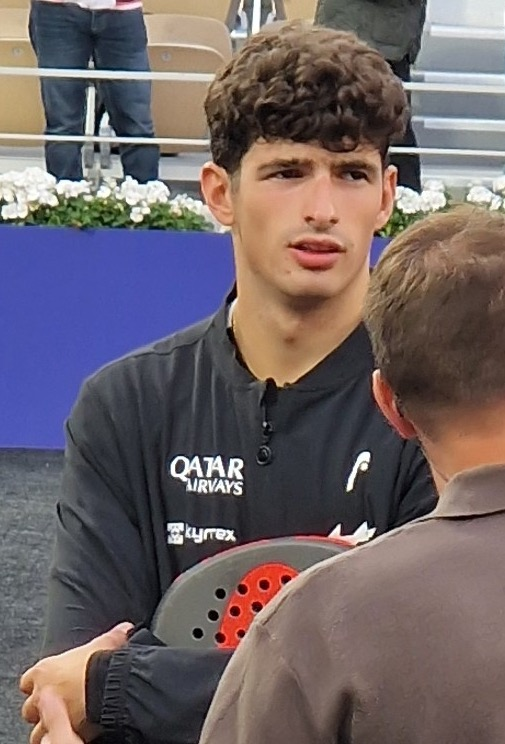
Arturo Coello, who has partnered Belasteguín for in the 2022 season, finishing as the number one ranked in three of them.

Belasteguín and Coello started 2022, ranked seventh as a team, by gradually improving their position during the year. They started the season winning the Miami Open. However, in the next three tournaments, they suffered a round-of-16 loss and two quarterfinal losses. They competed in the inaugural Premier Padel tournament, the Qatar Major, reaching the quarterfinals. They improved their results reaching the Brussels Open and Premier Padel's Italy Major semifinals, but in the next two tournaments were again defeated in the quarterfinals.

At the Vienna Open, Belasteguín and Coello reached the semifinals, but were defeated by the number one ranked Alejandro Galán and Juan Lebrón. At the French Open, they only managed to reach the quarterfinals, but in the following tournament, the Valladolid Master, they advanced to the final, where they were defeated by Galán and Lebrón. In the next two World Padel Tour tournaments, Belasteguín and Coello were eliminated in the quarterfinals in the first and suffered an unexpected first-round exit in the second. Between both events, they competed in the Premier Padel Paris Major, reaching the quarterfinals.

During the World Padel Tour summer break, Bela and Díaz competed in Premier Padel tournaments, reaching the quarterfinals of the Madrid P1 and the final of the Mendoza P1. They returned to the World Padel Tour, competing in the Cascais and Swedish Opens, reaching the semifinals in both tournaments.

In the last third of the season, Belasteguín and Coello improved their performance. They won the Madrid Master, defeating the top ranked team, Alejandro Galán and Juan Lebrón in the semifinals, and won the Amsterdam Open, after defeating Franco Stupaczuk and Pablo Lima in the final. Bela and Coello also reached the final of the Santander Open, but were defeated by Paquito Navarro and Martín Di Nenno. In the next two tournaments, they reached the semifinals of the first and suffered an unexpected round-of-16 elimination in the second. They reached their seventh final of the season at the Buenos Aires Master, where they were defeated by Galán and Lebrón, who had also eliminated them in the semi-finals of the Premier Padel New Giza P1 tournament. Before the Buenos Aires Master, Belasteguín represented Argentina and won the World Championship with the team.

Before the Barcelona Master Finals, they competed in two Premier Padel tournaments, winning the Mexico Major, defeating Franco Stupaczuk and Pablo Lima in the final, and reaching the semifinals of the Milan P1. At the Master Finals, Belasteguín and Coello were eliminated in the quarterfinals, finishing the season as the third-ranked team, slightly behind the second-ranked, Sanyo Gutiérrez and Agustín Tapia.

=== Return with Sanyo and run with Mike Yanguas ===
==== 2023 ====
In the 2023 season, Coello partnered with Tapia, while Belasteguín reunited with Sanyo Gutiérrez. The Argentine world champions began the season facing Martín Di Nenno and Franco Stupaczuk twice, in the quarterfinals of the Abu Dhabi Master and losing the final of the Premier Padel Qatar Major. However, a combination of injuries and early eliminations in the next four tournaments led the team to part ways in April.

Belasteguín teamed up with Mike Yanguas for the rest of the season. Although they didn't reach any final, their World Padel Tour results improved, reaching various quarterfinals and a semifinal at the Denmark Open, before an injury forced Belasteguín to miss the French Open. Next, they reached the semifinals of Premier Padel's Rome Major and further quarterfinals across both circuits. In September, they competed in the Paris Major, organized by Premier Padel at Roland Garros, reaching the quarterfinals. An injury caused Belasteguín to miss the next five tournaments. As a result, he failed to qualify for the Master Finals for the first time in his career. They played their last tournament together at the Milan P1, exiting in the round-of-16. After finishing the season without a title for the first time in twenty-five years, Belasteguín announced that 2024 would be the final year of his professional career.

=== Different partners and final year ===
In 2024, he started the final season of his career with left-handed player Lucho Capra as his partner. They began the season as the eighth-ranked team, however, bad results in the first three tournaments led to their separation.

An injury forced him to miss the next two tournaments, with Belasteguín returning at the Seville P2, with new partner Juan Tello. They entered the tournament as the fifth seeds, but were knocked out in the round-of-32. Their best period came between May and early June, with Belasteguín's first quarterfinal appearance of the season at Asunción's P2, followed by two more quarterfinals at Mar del Plata and Santiago P1s. Their best performance came at the Bordeaux P2, where they entered as the top seeds but were eliminated in the semifinals after a third-set tie-break. They were unable to maintain the good results, reaching the summer break with only one quarterfinal in four tournaments. After the break, their best performance came at the Rotterdam P1, where they reached the quarterfinals, losing against Franco Stupaczuk and Mike Yanguas, and nearly advancing to the semifinals. Following a disappointing result at the next tournament, they opted for ending the partnership, with Belasteguín choosing Valentino Libaak as his last partner.

Belasteguín and Libaak debuted at the Paris Major, in Roland Garros, but were eliminated in the first round. In the next four tournaments, they obtained mixed results, reaching the quarterfinals only once. Belasteguín played his final tournament at the Milan P1, exiting in the round-of-16 and officially ending his padel career after nearly thirthy years.

In April 2024, Belasteguín visited the Vatican City to celebrate the International Day of Sport for Development and Peace.

== Honours ==
=== Spanish and International Circuit (2002–2005) ===
Win Draw Loss

==== Finals ====
N.º	Year	Tournament	Category	Partner	Opponents in the final	Result	Career title No.
1	21 April 2002	(Spain) Opel Padel Tour Bilbao	Open	(Spain) Juan Martín Díaz	(Spain) Willy Lahoz (Argentina) Roby Gattiker	6–4 / 6–0	1st
2	19 May 2002	(Spain) Opel Padel Tour Valladolid	Open	(Spain) Juan Martín Díaz	(Spain) Pablo Semprún (Argentina) Hernán Auguste	6–2 / 5–7 / 4–6	—
3	14 July 2002	(Spain) III San Sebastián Open	Open	(Spain) Juan Martín Díaz	(Spain) Pablo Semprún (Argentina) Hernán Auguste	6–0 / 6–4	2nd
4	3 August 2002	(Spain) IV Open Altea Hills	Open	(Spain) Juan Martín Díaz	(Spain) Willy Lahoz (Argentina) Roby Gattiker	6–2 / 6–3	3rd
5	8 August 2002	(Spain) Sotogrande Open	Open	(Spain) Juan Martín Díaz	(Spain) Willy Lahoz (Argentina) Roby Gattiker	6–2/ 4–6 / 6–2	4th
6	13 August 2002	(Spain) III Torre Bellver International	International	(Spain) Juan Martín Díaz	(Spain) Willy Lahoz (Argentina) Roby Gattiker	6–1 / 6–0	5th
7	22 August 2002	(Spain) Sotogrande International	International	(Spain) Juan Martín Díaz	(Argentina) Gaby Reca (Argentina) Seba Nerone	4–6 / 6–7	—
8	27 August 2002	(Spain) Opel Padel Tour Vista Hermosa	International	(Spain) Juan Martín Díaz	(Argentina) Gaby Reca (Argentina) Seba Nerone	6–2 / 4–6 / 6–4	6th
9	8 September 2002	(Spain) II Bank of Santander Open	Open	(Spain) Juan Martín Díaz	(Argentina) Lasaigues (Spain) Piñón	6–2 / 6–0	7th
10	15 September 2002	(Spain) Madrid International	International	(Spain) Juan Martín Díaz	(Spain) Pablo Semprún (Argentina) Hernán Auguste	6–3 / 6–1	8th
11	29 September 2002	(Spain) III Badajoz Open	Open	(Spain) Juan Martín Díaz	(Spain) Pablo Semprún (Argentina) Hernán Auguste	4–6 / 6–7	—
12	6 October 2002	(Spain) IV Catalunya International	International	(Spain) Juan Martín Díaz	(Argentina) Gaby Reca (Argentina) Seba Nerone	6–3 / 6–3	9th
13	20 October 2002	(Spain) VII Euskadi International	International	(Spain) Juan Martín Díaz	(Argentina) Gaby Reca (Argentina) Seba Nerone	5–7 / 6–3 / 6–4	10th
14	27 October 2002	(Spain) Opel Padel Tour Seville	International	(Spain) Juan Martín Díaz	(Argentina) Cristián Gutiérrez (Argentina) Rovaletti	5–7 / 6–3 / 6–4	11th
15	1 December 2002	(Mexico) World Doubles Championship	World	(Spain) Juan Martín Díaz	(Argentina) Gaby Reca (Argentina) Seba Nerone	6–7 / 7–5 / 6–4	12nd
16	4 May 2003	(Spain) Ciudad de Melilla International	International	(Spain) Juan Martín Díaz	(Argentina) Roby Gattiker (Argentina) Cristián Gutiérrez	3–6 / 6–3 / 7–6	13rd
17	11 May 2003	(Spain) Opel Padel Tour Valladolid	Open International	(Spain) Juan Martín Díaz	(Argentina) Gaby Reca (Argentina) Seba Nerone	6–3 / 2–0/ w.o.	14th
18	22 June 2003	(Spain) Opel Padel Tour Bilbao	Open International	(Spain) Juan Martín Díaz	(Argentina) Hernán Auguste (Argentina) Lasaigues	6–3 / 6–2	15th
19	11 August 2003	(Spain) IV Torre Bellver International	International	(Spain) Juan Martín Díaz	(Argentina) Roby Gattiker (Argentina) Cristián Gutiérrez	6–4 / 5–7 / 6–4	16th
20	16 August 2003	(Spain) Marbella	International	(Spain) Juan Martín Díaz	(Argentina) Roby Gattiker (Argentina) Cristián Gutiérrez	6–1 / 6–4	17th
21	14 September 2003	(Spain) Madrid International	International	(Spain) Juan Martín Díaz	(Argentina) Gaby Reca (Argentina) Seba Nerone	6–3 / 3–6 / 6–1	18th
22	28 September 2003	(Spain) VIII Euskadi International	International	(Spain) Juan Martín Díaz	(Argentina) Gaby Reca (Argentina) Seba Nerone	6–3 / 6–2	—
23	26 October 2003	(Spain) Opel Padel Tour Seville	International	(Spain) Juan Martín Díaz	(Argentina) Gaby Reca (Argentina) Seba Nerone	shared	19th
24	25 April 2004	(Spain) Opel Padel Tour Bilbao	Open International	(Spain) Juan Martín Díaz	(Argentina) Cristián Gutiérrez (Argentina) Hernán Auguste	3–6 / 6–1 / 6–3	20th
25	2 May 2004	(Spain) II Melilla International	International	(Spain) Juan Martín Díaz	(Argentina) Cristián Gutiérrez (Argentina) Hernán Auguste	6–4 / 6–3	21st
26	9 May 2004	(Spain) Opel Padel Tour Seville	Open International	(Spain) Juan Martín Díaz	(Argentina) Cristián Gutiérrez (Argentina) Hernán Auguste	6–1 / 6–2	22nd
27	13 June 2004	(Spain) Opel Padel Tour Valladolid	Open Internacional	(Spain) Juan Martín Díaz	(Argentina) Cristián Gutiérrez (Argentina) Hernán Auguste	3–6/ 6–3 / 6–1	23rd
28	20 June 2004	(Spain) VI Catalunya International	International	(Spain) Juan Martín Díaz	(Argentina) Cristián Gutiérrez (Argentina) Hernán Auguste	6–2 / 6–1	24th
29	4 July 2004	(Spain) Cantabria Open Challenger		(Spain) Juan Martín Díaz	(Argentina) Gaby Reca (Argentina) Seba Nerone		25th
30	9 August 2004	(Spain) Torres Bellver International	International	(Spain) Juan Martín Díaz	(Argentina) Cristián Gutiérrez (Argentina) Hernán Auguste	3–6 / 4–6	—
31	17 August 2004	(Spain) I Higuerón International	International	(Spain) Juan Martín Díaz	(Spain) Willy Lahoz (Brazil) Marcelo Jardim	7–6 / 5–7 / 2–6	—
32	22 August 2004	(Spain) V Andalucia International	International	(Spain) Juan Martín Díaz	(Argentina) Matí Díaz (Argentina) Malacalza	6–3 / 6–4	26th
33	26 August 2004	(Spain) Opel Padel Tour Vista Hermosa	Open International	(Spain) Juan Martín Díaz	(Argentina) Gaby Reca (Argentina) Seba Nerone	7–5 / 6–4	27th
34	12 September 2004	(Spain) XI Madrid International	International	(Spain) Juan Martín Díaz	(Argentina) Gaby Reca (Argentina) Seba Nerone	6–4 / 7–6	28th
35	3 October 2004	(Spain) Seville International	International	(Spain) Juan Martín Díaz	(Argentina) Gaby Reca (Argentina) Seba Nerone	6–4 / 6–3	29th
36	10 October 2004	(Spain) Euskadi International	International	(Spain) Juan Martín Díaz	(Argentina) Gaby Reca (Argentina) Seba Nerone	6–7 / 6–7	—
37	24 October 2004	(Spain) Master Caja de Madrid	Master	(Spain) Juan Martín Díaz	(Argentina) Cristián Gutiérrez (Argentina) Hernán Auguste	6–3 / 6–0	30th
38	21 November 2004	(Argentina) World Doubles Championship	World	(Spain) Juan Martín Díaz	(Argentina) Gaby Reca (Argentina) Seba Nerone	4–6 / 6–1 / 6–4	31st
39	10 April 2005	(Spain) VII Catalonia Open	International	(Spain) Juan Martín Díaz	(Spain) Willy Lahoz (Brazil) Marcelo Jardim	6–3 / 7–6	32nd
40	22 May 2005	(Spain) Opel Padel Tour Bilbao	Open	(Spain) Juan Martín Díaz	(Argentina) Gaby Reca (Argentina) Seba Nerone	7–5 / 6–2	33rd
41	19 June 2005	(Spain) Valencia	International	(Spain) Juan Martín Díaz	(Argentina) Cristián Gutiérrez (Argentina) Hernán Auguste	W.O.	34th
42	25 June 2005	(Portugal) Lisbon	International	(Spain) Juan Martín Díaz	(Spain) Willy Lahoz (Brazil) Marcelo Jardim	6–7/ 6–0 / 6–3	35th
43	3 July 2005	(Spain) III Córdoba Open	International	(Spain) Juan Martín Díaz	(Argentina) Cristián Gutiérrez (Argentina) Hernán Auguste	6–3 / 6–2	36th
44	10 July 2005	(Spain) International Master Caja de Madrid	Master	(Spain) Juan Martín Díaz	(Spain) Willy Lahoz (Brazil) Marcelo Jardim	6–1 / 5–7 / 6–0	37th
45	7 August 2005	(Spain) Higuerón International	International	(Spain) Juan Martín Díaz	(Argentina) Cristián Gutiérrez (Argentina) Hernán Auguste	3–6 / 6–3 / 6–4	38th
46	16 August 2005	(Spain) VI Torre Bellver	International	(Spain) Juan Martín Díaz	(Argentina) Gaby Reca (Argentina) Seba Nerone	2–6 / 7–5 / 6–1	39th
47	21 August 2005	(Spain) V Andalusia Open	International	(Spain) Juan Martín Díaz	(Argentina) Gaby Reca (Argentina) Seba Nerone	3–6 / 2–6	—
48	4 September 2005	(Spain) I Islas Baleares Master	Masters	(Spain) Juan Martín Díaz	(Argentina) Cristián Gutiérrez (Argentina) Hernán Auguste	7–5 / 6–4	40th
49	25 September 2005	(Spain) VI Badajoz International	International	(Spain) Juan Martín Díaz	(Argentina) Gaby Reca (Argentina) Seba Nerone	6–2 / 6–4	41st
50	2 October 2005	(Spain) X Euskadi International	International	(Spain) Juan Martín Díaz	(Argentina) Gaby Reca (Argentina) Seba Nerone	7–5 / 6–0	42nd

=== Padel Pro Tour (2006–2012) ===
Win Draw Loss

==== Finals ====
N.º	Year	Tournament	Category	Partner	Opponents in the final	Result	Career Title No.
1	14 May 2006	(Spain) Córdoba	International	(Spain) Juan Martín Díaz	(Argentina) Sebastián Nerone (Argentina) Gabriel Reca	6–2 / 6–1	43rd
2	4 June 2006	(Spain) Majadahonda	International	(Spain) Juan Martín Díaz	(Argentina) Sebastián Nerone (Argentina) Gabriel Reca	6–0 / 6–0	44th
3	10 June 2006	(Spain) Valencia	International	(Spain) Juan Martín Díaz	(Argentina) Sebastián Nerone (Argentina) Gabriel Reca	6–4 / 6–3	45th
4	25 June 2006	(Spain) FEP Madrid	Open	(Spain) Juan Martín Díaz	(Argentina) Sebastián Nerone (Brazil) Marcello Jardim	6–1 / 6–4	46th
5	2 July 2006	(Spain) Alicante	International	(Spain) Juan Martín Díaz	(Argentina) Sebastián Nerone (Argentina) Gabriel Reca	6–3 / 6–4	47th
6	9 July 2006	(Spain) Valladolid	International	(Spain) Juan Martín Díaz	(Argentina) Sebastián Nerone (Argentina) Gabriel Reca	6–3 / 6–3	48th
7	11 August 2006	(Spain) Marbella	International	(Spain) Juan Martín Díaz	(Spain) Raúl Arias (Argentina) Ramiro Nanni	6–3 / 6–4	49th
8	15 August 2006	(Spain) Oropesa del Mar	International	(Spain) Juan Martín Díaz	(Argentina) Sebastián Nerone (Argentina) Gabriel Reca	7–6^{(9)} / 6–4	50th
9	20 August 2006	(Spain) Reserva del Higuerón	International	(Spain) Juan Martín Díaz	(Argentina) Sebastián Nerone (Argentina) Gabriel Reca	6–4 / 6–0	51st
10	25 August 2006	(Spain) El Puerto de Santa María	International	(Spain) Juan Martín Díaz	(Argentina) Sebastián Nerone (Argentina) Gabriel Reca	6–3 / 6–2	52nd
11	3 September 2006	(Spain) Palma de Mallorca	International	(Spain) Juan Martín Díaz	(Argentina) Sebastián Nerone (Argentina) Gabriel Reca	6–3 / 7–5	53rd
12	17 September 2006	(Spain) Mérida	International	(Spain) Juan Martín Díaz	(Argentina) Roby Gattiker (Brazil) Pablo Lima	6–2 / 6–0	54th
13	24 September 2006	(Spain) Madrid	International	(Spain) Juan Martín Díaz	(Argentina) Sebastián Nerone (Argentina) Gabriel Reca	6–4 / 4–6 / 6–1	55th
14	1 October 2006	(Spain) Zaragoza	International	(Spain) Juan Martín Díaz	(Argentina) Sebastián Nerone (Argentina) Gabriel Reca	7–6^{(?)} / 6–3	56th
15	8 October 2006	(Spain) Guecho	International	(Spain) Juan Martín Díaz	(Argentina) Mati Díaz (Spain) Chema Montes	6–3 / 6–4	57th
16	5 November 2006	(Spain) Las Palmas	International	(Spain) Juan Martín Díaz	(Argentina) Roby Gattiker (Brazil) Pablo Lima	6–1 / 6–2	58th
17	3 December 2006	(Spain) Masters PPT Madrid	Master	(Spain) Juan Martín Díaz	(Argentina) Sebastián Nerone (Argentina) Gabriel Reca	6–3 / 6–2	59th
18	5 May 2007	(Spain) Córdoba	International	(Spain) Juan Martín Díaz	(Argentina) Sebastián Nerone (Argentina) Cristian Gutiérrez	6–1 / 6–3	60th
19	20 May 2007	(Spain) Barcelona	International	(Spain) Juan Martín Díaz	(Argentina) Sebastián Nerone (Argentina) Cristian Gutiérrez	6–3 / 7–5	61st
20	2 June 2007	(Spain) Madrid	International	(Spain) Juan Martín Díaz	(Argentina) Miguel Lamperti (Argentina) Mariano Lasaigues	6–3 / 6–2	62nd
21	17 June 2007	(Spain) Valencia	International	(Spain) Juan Martín Díaz	(Argentina) Sebastián Nerone (Argentina) Cristian Gutiérrez	6–3 / 2–6 / 6–4	63rd
22	8 July 2007	(Spain) Vitoria-Gasteiz	International	(Spain) Juan Martín Díaz	(Argentina) Sebastián Nerone (Argentina) Cristian Gutiérrez	7–6^{(?)} / 6–4	64th
23	28 July 2007	(Spain) Madrid II	International	(Spain) Juan Martín Díaz	(Argentina) Sebastián Nerone (Argentina) Cristian Gutiérrez	6–4 / 7–6^{(?)}	65th
24	5 August 2007	(Spain) Oropesa del Mar	International	(Spain) Juan Martín Díaz	(Argentina) Sebastián Nerone (Argentina) Cristian Gutiérrez	6–2 / 5–2 / W.O.	66th
25	11 August 2007	(Spain) Marbella	International	(Spain) Juan Martín Díaz	(Argentina) Sebastián Nerone* (Argentina) Cristian Gutiérrez	*W.O.	67th
26	19 August 2007	(Spain) Reserva del Higuerón	International	(Spain) Juan Martín Díaz	(Argentina) Gabriel Reca (Argentina) Hernán Auguste	6–4 / 6–2	68th
27	24 August 2007	(Spain) Puerto de Santa María	International	(Spain) Juan Martín Díaz	(Argentina) Gabriel Reca (Argentina) Hernán Auguste	7–5 / 6–4	69th
28	2 September 2007	(Spain) Palma de Mallorca	International	(Spain) Juan Martín Díaz	(Argentina) Gabriel Reca (Argentina) Hernán Auguste	6–3 / 5–7 / 6–3	70th
29	16 September 2007	(Spain) Mérida	International	(Spain) Juan Martín Díaz	(Argentina) Miguel Lamperti (Argentina) Matías Díaz	6–1 / 6–2	71st
30	23 September 2007	(Spain) San Sebastián	International	(Spain) Juan Martín Díaz	(Argentina) Sebastián Nerone (Argentina) Cristian Gutiérrez	7–5 / 6–1	72nd
31	30 September 2007	(Spain) Zaragoza	International	(Spain) Juan Martín Díaz	(Argentina) Miguel Lamperti (Argentina) Matías Díaz	6–3 / 6–3	73rd
32	7 October 2007	(Spain) Bilbao	International	(Spain) Juan Martín Díaz	(Argentina) Sebastián Nerone (Argentina) Cristian Gutiérrez	6–2 / 7–5	74th
33	28 October 2007	(Spain) Las Palmas	International	(Spain) Juan Martín Díaz	(Argentina) Sebastián Nerone (Argentina) Cristian Gutiérrez	6–3 / 6–1	75th
34	1 November 2007	(Spain) Alicante	International	(Spain) Juan Martín Díaz	(Argentina) Gabriel Reca (Argentina) Hernán Auguste		76th
35	16 December 2007	(Spain) Master Final PPT Madrid	Master Final	(Spain) Juan Martín Díaz	(Argentina) Gabriel Reca (Argentina) Hernán Auguste	6–2 / 7–6^{(?)}	77th
36	13 April 2008	(Spain) Ciudad Real	International	(Spain) Juan Martín Díaz	(Argentina) Sebastián Nerone (Argentina) Cristian Gutiérrez	6–4 / 6–4	78th
37	27 April 2008	(Spain) Granada	International	(Spain) Juan Martín Díaz	(Argentina) Miguel Lamperti (Argentina) Matías Díaz	5–7 / 6–3 / 6–3	79th
38	12 May 2008	(Spain) Santander	International	(Spain) Juan Martín Díaz	(Argentina) Gabriel Reca (Argentina) Hernán Auguste	6–1 / 3–6 / 7–6^{(?)}	80th
39	19 May 2008	(Spain) Barcelona	International	(Spain) Juan Martín Díaz	(Spain) Guillermo Lahoz (Argentina) Gastón Malacalza	6–3 / 6–2	81st
40	31 May 2008	(Spain) Majadahonda	International	(Spain) Juan Martín Díaz	(Argentina) Sebastián Nerone (Argentina) Cristian Gutiérrez	6–3 / 6–4	82nd
41	15 June 2008	(Spain) Valencia	International	(Spain) Juan Martín Díaz	(Argentina) Gabriel Reca (Argentina) Hernán Auguste	5–7 / 6–1 / 5–7	—
42	29 June 2008	(Spain) La Rioja	International	(Spain) Juan Martín Díaz	(Spain) Guillermo Lahoz (Argentina) Gastón Malacalza	6–2 / 7–5	83rd
43	6 July 2008	(Spain) Valladolid	International	(Spain) Juan Martín Díaz	(Argentina) Maxi Grabiel (Argentina) Agustín Silingo	6–3 / 4–6 / 4–6	—
44	13 July 2008	(Spain) Vitoria-Gasteiz	International	(Spain) Juan Martín Díaz	(Argentina) Sebastián Nerone (Argentina) Cristian Gutiérrez	6–3 / 6–4	84th
45	19 July 2008	(Spain) Madrid	International	(Spain) Juan Martín Díaz	(Argentina) Sebastián Nerone (Argentina) Cristian Gutiérrez	6–2 / 6–7^{(?)} / 6–1	85th
46	10 August 2008	(Spain) Marbella	International	(Spain) Juan Martín Díaz	(Argentina) Sebastián Nerone (Argentina) Cristian Gutiérrez	6–3 / 6–3	86th
47	17 August 2008	(Spain) Reserva del Higuerón	International	(Spain) Juan Martín Díaz	(Argentina) Miguel Lamperti (Argentina) Matías Díaz	6–1 / 6–4	87th
48	23 August 2008	(Spain) Benicasim	International	(Spain) Juan Martín Díaz	(Argentina) Sebastián Nerone (Argentina) Cristian Gutiérrez	7–5 / 6–3	88th
49	7 September 2008	(Spain) Islas Baleares	International	(Spain) Juan Martín Díaz	(Argentina) Sebastián Nerone (Argentina) Cristian Gutiérrez	6–1 / 3–6 / 6–3	89th
50	14 September 2008	(Spain) Mérida	International	(Spain) Juan Martín Díaz	(Argentina) Miguel Lamperti (Argentina) Matías Díaz	6–3 / 6–3	90th
51	21 September 2008	(Spain) San Sebastián	International	(Spain) Juan Martín Díaz	(Argentina) Sebastián Nerone (Argentina) Cristian Gutiérrez	6–4 / 6–3	91st
52	28 September 2008	(Spain) Zaragoza	International	(Spain) Juan Martín Díaz	(Argentina) Sebastián Nerone (Argentina) Cristian Gutiérrez	6–1 / 6–3	92nd
53	5 October 2008	(Spain) Bilbao	International	(Spain) Juan Martín Díaz	(Argentina) Sebastián Nerone (Argentina) Cristian Gutiérrez	6–7^{(?)} / 6–4 / 6–4	93rd
54	31 May 2009	(Spain) Madrid	International	(Spain) Juan Martín Díaz	(Spain) Juani Mieres (Brazil) Pablo Lima	6–4 / 6–0	—
55	14 June 2009	(Spain) Barcelona	Internacional	(Spain) Juan Martín Díaz	(Argentina) Sebastián Nerone (Argentina) Cristian Gutiérrez	6–4 / 6–2	94th
56	28 June 2009	(Spain) Córdoba	International	(Spain) Juan Martín Díaz	(Argentina) Miguel Lamperti (Argentina) Matías Díaz	7–6^{(4)} / 7–5	95th
57	5 July 2009	(Spain) Valladolid	International	(Spain) Juan Martín Díaz	(Argentina) Gabriel Reca (Argentina) Hernán Auguste	6–2 / 7–5	96th
58	12 July 2009	(Spain) Alicante	International	(Spain) Juan Martín Díaz	(Spain) Juani Mieres (Brazil) Pablo Lima	6–2 / 7–6	97th
59	2 August 2009	(Spain) Marbella	International	(Spain) Juan Martín Díaz	(Argentina) Cristian Gutiérrez (Argentina) Sebastián Nerone	6–3 / 6–4	98th
60	9 August 2009	(Spain) Fuengirola	International	(Spain) Juan Martín Díaz	(Argentina) Cristian Gutiérrez (Argentina) Sebastián Nerone	5–7 / 6–4 / 4–6	—
61	20 September 2009	(Spain) San Sebastián	International	(Spain) Juan Martín Díaz	(Spain) Juani Mieres (Brazil) Pablo Lima	6–2 / 6–2	99th
62	27 September 2009	(Spain) Zaragoza	International	(Spain) Juan Martín Díaz	(Argentina) Cristian Gutiérrez (Argentina) Sebastián Nerone	6–1 / 6–3	100th
63	4 October 2009	(Spain) Bilbao	International	(Spain) Juan Martín Díaz	(Argentina) Sebastián Nerone (Argentina) Cristian Gutiérrez	4–6 / 6–4 / 6–2	101st
64	18 October 2009	(Spain) Valencia	International	(Spain) Juan Martín Díaz	(Argentina) Sebastián Nerone (Argentina) Cristian Gutiérrez	6–2 / 6–1	102nd
65	25 October 2009	(Spain) Ciudad Real	International	(Spain) Juan Martín Díaz	(Argentina) Sebastián Nerone (Argentina) Cristian Gutiérrez	7–6^{(5)} / 7–5	103rd
66	28 November 2009	(Spain) Salamanca	International	(Spain) Juan Martín Díaz	(Spain) Juani Mieres (Brazil) Pablo Lima	4–6 / 5–7	—
67	13 December 2009	(Spain) Masters PPT Madrid	Madrid	(Spain) Juan Martín Díaz	(Spain) Juani Mieres (Brazil) Pablo Lima	6–4 / 6–2	104th
68	16 May 2010	(Spain) San Sebastián	International	(Spain) Juan Martín Díaz	(Argentina) Miguel Lamperti (Spain) Matías Díaz	6–3 / 6–1	105th
69	5 June 2010	(Spain) Barcelona	International	(Spain) Juan Martín Díaz	(Argentina) Gabriel Reca (Argentina) Hernán Auguste	6–2 / 6–3	106th
70	11 July 2010	(Spain) Alicante	International	(Spain) Juan Martín Díaz	(Argentina) Miguel Lamperti (Spain) Matías Díaz	6–3 / W.O.	107th
71	18 July 2010	(Spain) Madrid	International	(Spain) Juan Martín Díaz	(Spain) Juani Mieres (Brazil) Pablo Lima	7–5 / 6–2	108th
72	25 July 2010	(Spain) Benicasim	International	(Spain) Juan Martín Díaz	(Spain) Juani Mieres (Brazil) Pablo Lima	6–3 / 7–5	109th
73	1 August 2010	(Spain) Marbella	International	(Spain) Juan Martín Díaz	(Argentina) Miguel Lamperti (Spain) Matías Díaz	6–2 / 6–3	110th
74	8 August 2010	(Spain) Fuengirola	International	(Spain) Juan Martín Díaz	(Spain) Juani Mieres (Brazil) Pablo Lima	6–3 / 6–4	111th
75	19 September 2010	(Spain) Sevilla	International	(Spain) Juan Martín Díaz	(Brazil) Pablo Lima (Spain) Juani Mieres	2–6 / 3–6	—
76	26 September 2010	(Spain) Navarra	International	(Spain) Juan Martín Díaz	(Spain) Juani Mieres (Brazil) Pablo Lima	6–4 / 6–7 / 6–1	112th
77	3 October 2010	(Spain) Bilbao	International	(Spain) Juan Martín Díaz	(Spain) Juani Mieres (Brazil) Pablo Lima	6–3 / 6–4	113th
78	24 October 2010	(Spain) Murcia	International	(Spain) Juan Martín Díaz	(Spain) Juani Mieres (Brazil) Pablo Lima	3–6 / 6–4 / 6–4	114th
79	7 November 2010	(Spain) Logroño	International	(Spain) Juan Martín Díaz	(Spain) Juani Mieres (Brazil) Pablo Lima	7–6 / 6–7 / 6–3	115th
80	19 December 2010	(Spain) Masters PPT Madrid	Master	(Spain) Juan Martín Díaz	(Spain) Juani Mieres (Brazil) Pablo Lima	6–3 / 6–4	116th
81	3 April 2011	(Argentina) Mendoza	International	(Spain) Juan Martín Díaz	(Brazil) Pablo Lima (Spain) Juani Mieres	2–6 / 6–7	—
82	29 May 2011	(Spain) Madrid	International	(Spain) Juan Martín Díaz	(Argentina) Miguel Lamperti (Argentina) Cristian Gutiérrez	6–3 / 6–3	117th
83	5 June 2011	(Spain) Barcelona	International	(Spain) Juan Martín Díaz	(Spain) Juani Mieres (Brazil) Pablo Lima	6–4 / 6–3	118th
84	3 July 2011	(Spain) Valladolid	International	(Spain) Juan Martín Díaz	(Argentina) Agustín Gómez Silingo (Argentina) Gabriel Reca	6–2 / 6–2	119th
85	10 July 2011	(Spain) Alicante	International	(Spain) Juan Martín Díaz	(Spain) Juani Mieres (Brazil) Pablo Lima	6–1 / 6–1	120th
86	24 July 2011	(Spain) Benicasim	International	(Spain) Juan Martín Díaz	(Argentina) Miguel Lamperti (Argentina) Cristian Gutiérrez	6–4 / 6–4	121st
87	31 July 2011	(Spain) Marbella	International	(Spain) Juan Martín Díaz	(Spain) Juani Mieres (Brazil) Pablo Lima	4–6 / 7–6 / 6–3	122nd
88	14 August 2011	(Spain) Gijón	International	(Spain) Juan Martín Díaz	(Argentina) Matías Díaz (Argentina) Hernán Auguste	6–1 / 6–4	123rd
89	25 September 2011	(Spain) Sevilla	International	(Spain) Juan Martín Díaz	(Argentina) Miguel Lamperti (Argentina) Cristian Gutiérrez	6–3 / 6–4	124th
90	2 October 2011	(Spain) Madrid II	International	(Spain) Juan Martín Díaz	(Spain) Juani Mieres (Brazil) Pablo Lima	6–4 / 7–6	125th
91	9 October 2011	(Spain) Bilbao	International	(Spain) Juan Martín Díaz	(Spain) Juani Mieres (Brazil) Pablo Lima	6–4 / 6–4	126th
92	6 November 2011	(Spain) Logroño	International	(Spain) Juan Martín Díaz	(Spain) Juani Mieres (Brazil) Pablo Lima	7–6 / 6–4	127th
93	13 November 2011	(Spain) Vitoria-Gasteiz	International	(Spain) Juan Martín Díaz	(Spain) Juani Mieres (Brazil) Pablo Lima	7–6 / 7–5	128th
94	19 February 2012	(Argentina) Mendoza	International	(Spain) Juan Martín Díaz	(Argentina) Miguel Lamperti (Argentina) Maxi Grabiel	6–3 / 6–3	—
95	26 February 2012	(Argentina) Buenos Aires	International	(Spain) Juan Martín Díaz	(Spain) Juani Mieres (Brazil) Pablo Lima	6–4 / 6–3	129th
96	27 May 2012	(Spain) Madrid	International	(Spain) Juan Martín Díaz	(Argentina) Cristian Gutiérrez (Argentina) Fernando Poggi	7–5 / 6–1	130th
97	10 June 2012	(Spain) Barcelona	International	(Spain) Juan Martín Díaz	(Spain) Juani Mieres (Brazil) Pablo Lima	6–2 / 6–3	131st
98	17 June 2012	(Spain) Córdoba	International	(Spain) Juan Martín Díaz	(Spain) Juani Mieres (Brazil) Pablo Lima	6–4 / 7–6	132nd
99	1 July 2012	(Spain) Valladolid	International	(Spain) Juan Martín Díaz	(Spain) Paquito Navarro (Argentina) Adrián Allemandi	6–4 / 6–3	133rd
100	5 August 2012	(Spain) Fuengirola	International	(Spain) Juan Martín Díaz	(Spain) Juani Mieres (Brazil) Pablo Lima	7–5 / 7–6	134th
101	19 August 2012	(Spain) Gijón	International	(Spain) Juan Martín Díaz	(Spain) Juani Mieres (Brazil) Pablo Lima	6–4 / 6–7 / 3–6	—
102	2 September 2012	(Spain) Palma de Mallorca	International	(Spain) Juan Martín Díaz	(Spain) Juani Mieres (Brazil) Pablo Lima	6–3 / 6–4	135th
103	9 September 2012	(Spain) Ibiza	International	(Spain) Juan Martín Díaz	(Spain) Juani Mieres (Brazil) Pablo Lima	2–6 / 6–3 / 6–4	136th
104	30 September 2012	(Spain) Madrid	International	(Spain) Juan Martín Díaz	(Argentina) Miguel Lamperti (Argentina) Maxi Grabiel	7–5 / 6–3	137th

=== World Padel Tour (2013–2023) ===
Win Draw Loss

==== Finals ====
N.º	Year	Tournament	Category	Partner	Opponents in the final	Result	Career Title No.
1	14 April 2013	(Spain) Murcia	Open	(Spain) Juan Martín Díaz	(Spain) Juani Mieres (Brazil) Pablo Lima	6–3 / 6–7 / 6–3	138th
2	12 May 2013	(Spain) Seville	Open	(Spain) Juan Martín Díaz	(Spain) Juani Mieres (Brazil) Pablo Lima	4–6 / 7–6 / 6–4 / 6–3	139th
3	26 May 2013	(Spain) Cáceres	Open	(Spain) Juan Martín Díaz	(Argentina) Maxi Sánchez (Argentina) Sanyo Gutiérrez	6–3 / 6–2 / 6–2	140th
4	9 June 2013	(Spain) Barcelona	Open	(Spain) Juan Martín Díaz	(Spain) Juani Mieres (Brazil) Pablo Lima	6–1 / 6–4 / 4–6 / 6–3	141st
5	23 June 2013	(Spain) Madrid	Open	(Spain) Juan Martín Díaz	(Brazil) Pablo Lima (Spain) Juani Mieres	7–6 / 0–6 / 6–7 / 4–6	—
6	4 August 2013	(Spain) Málaga	Open	(Spain) Juan Martín Díaz	(Spain) Juani Mieres (Brazil) Pablo Lima	6–4 / 6–4 / 6–4	142nd
7	18 August 2013	(Spain) Benicasim	Open	(Spain) Juan Martín Díaz	(Spain) Juani Mieres (Brazil) Pablo Lima	7–5 / 6–1 / 4–6 / 6–4	143rd
8	1 September 2013	(Spain) Alicante	Open	(Spain) Juan Martín Díaz	(Argentina) Matías Díaz (Argentina) Cristian Gutiérrez	6–2 / 6–4 / 6–4	144th
9	15 September 2013	(Spain) Bilbao	Open	(Spain) Juan Martín Díaz	(Spain) Juani Mieres (Brazil) Pablo Lima	4–6 / 6–3 / 7–5 / 6–2	145th
10	29 September 2013	(Spain) Granada	Open	(Spain) Juan Martín Díaz	(Spain) Juani Mieres (Brazil) Pablo Lima	7–6 / 6–4 / 6–3	146th
11	13 October 2013	(Portugal) Lisbon	Open	(Spain) Juan Martín Díaz	(Spain) Juani Mieres (Brazil) Pablo Lima	6–3 / 2–6 / 6–3 / 6–4	147th
12	22 December 2013	(Spain) Madrid	Master Final	(Spain) Juan Martín Díaz	(Argentina) Sanyo Gutiérrez (Argentina) Maxi Sánchez	7–6 / 1–6 / 6–7 / W.O.	—
13	25 May 2014	(Spain) Barcelona	Open	(Spain) Juan Martín Díaz	(Spain) Juani Mieres (Brazil) Pablo Lima	6–3 / 4–6 / 6–2 / 6–3	148th
14	15 June 2014	(Spain) Badajoz	Open	(Spain) Juan Martín Díaz	(Spain) Juani Mieres (Brazil) Pablo Lima	6–4 / 6–3 / 6–2	149th
15	29 June 2014	(Spain) Córdoba	Open	(Spain) Juan Martín Díaz	(Spain) Juani Mieres (Brazil) Pablo Lima	6–2 / 6–7 / 6–3 / 6–3	150th
16	13 July 2014	(Spain) Castellón	Open	(Spain) Juan Martín Díaz	(Brazil) Pablo Lima (Spain) Juani Mieres	6–2 / 3–6 / 3–6 / 3–6	—
17	3 August 2014	(Spain) Marbella	Open	(Spain) Juan Martín Díaz	(Spain) Paquito Navarro (Argentina) Adrián Allemandi	6–1 / 6–7 / 6–3 / 6–4	151st
18	24 August 2014	(Spain) Alicante	Open	(Spain) Juan Martín Díaz	(Brazil) Pablo Lima (Spain) Juani Mieres	6–2 / 5–7 / 6–7 / 6–4 / 5–7	—
19	7 September 2014	(Spain) Alcobendas	Open	(Spain) Juan Martín Díaz	(Argentina) Cristian Gutiérrez (Spain) Matías Díaz	6–4 / 4–6 / 5–7 / 6–3 / 6–4	152nd
20	21 September 2014	(Spain) Seville	Open	(Spain) Juan Martín Díaz	(Argentina) Maxi Sánchez (Argentina) Sanyo Gutiérrez	6–3 / 6–3 / 6–1	153rd
21	5 October 2014	(Portugal) Lisbon	Open	(Spain) Juan Martín Díaz	(Argentina) Maxi Sánchez (Argentina) Sanyo Gutiérrez	6–4 / 6–4 / 6–1	154th
22	19 October 2014	(Spain) San Cristóbal de La Laguna	Open	(Spain) Juan Martín Díaz	(Spain) Juani Mieres (Brazil) Pablo Lima	6–4 / 1–6 / 6–2	155th
23	9 November 2014	(Spain) Valencia	Open	(Spain) Juan Martín Díaz	(Argentina) Maxi Grabiel (Spain) Paquito Navaro	2–6 / 6–3 / 3–6 / 5–7	—
24	30 November 2014	(Argentina) Córdoba	Open	(Spain) Juan Martín Díaz	(Argentina) Maxi Sánchez (Argentina) Sanyo Gutiérrez	6–1 / 5–7 / 6–3	156th
25	21 December 2014	(Spain) Madrid	Master Final	(Spain) Juan Martín Díaz	(Argentina) Sanyo Gutiérrez (Argentina) Maxi Sánchez	6–7 / 7–5 / 5–7	—
26	12 April 2015	(Spain) Cádiz	Open	(Spain) Guillermo Lahoz	(Spain) Paquito Navarro (Spain) Matías Díaz	6–4 / 6–3	157th
27	26 April 2015	(Spain) Santa Cruz de La Palma	Open	(Spain) Guillermo Lahoz	(Spain) Paquito Navarro (Spain) Matías Díaz	6–2 / 7–6	158th
28	7 June 2015	(Argentina) Río Gallegos	Open	(Brazil) Pablo Lima	(Argentina) Maxi Sánchez (Argentina) Sanyo Gutiérrez	5–7 / 6–2 / 6–2	159th
29	21 June 2015	(Spain) Valladolid	Open	(Brazil) Pablo Lima	(Spain) Paquito Navarro (Spain) Matías Díaz	7–6 / 6–7 / 7–6	160th
30	19 July 2015	(Spain) Palma de Mallorca	Open	(Brazil) Pablo Lima	(Argentina) Maxi Sánchez (Spain) Juan Martín Díaz	6–4 / 6–0	161st
31	2 August 2015	(Spain) Málaga	Master	(Brazil) Pablo Lima	(Argentina) Maxi Sánchez (Spain) Juan Martín Díaz	7–6 / 6–3	162nd
32	23 August 2015	(Spain) La Nucia	Open	(Brazil) Pablo Lima	(Argentina) Maxi Sánchez (Spain) Juan Martín Díaz	7–6 / 7–6	163rd
33	13 September 2015	Monaco	Master	(Brazil) Pablo Lima	(Spain) Paquito Navarro (Spain) Matías Díaz	6–3 / 6–1	164th
34	4 October 2015	(Spain) Seville	Open	(Brazil) Pablo Lima	(Argentina) Sanyo Gutiérrez (Spain) Juani Mieres	6–2 / 6–0	165th
35	18 October 2015	(Spain) Villagarcía de Arosa	Open	(Brazil) Pablo Lima	(Argentina) Maxi Sánchez (Spain) Juan Martín Díaz	6–4 / 6–4	166th
36	31 October 2015	(United Arab Emirates) Dubai	Master	(Brazil) Pablo Lima	(Argentina) Sanyo Gutiérrez (Spain) Juani Mieres	6–1 / 6–2	167th
37	8 November 2015	(Spain) San Sebastián	Open	(Brazil) Pablo Lima	(Argentina) Sanyo Gutiérrez (Spain) Juani Mieres	7–5 / 6–4	168th
38	29 November 2015	(Spain) Valencia	Open	(Brazil) Pablo Lima	(Argentina) Miguel Lamperti (Argentina) Adrián Allemandi	6–2 / 6–1	169th
39	3 April 2016	(Spain) Gijón	Open	(Brazil) Pablo Lima	(Argentina) Maxi Sánchez (Spain) Matías Díaz	6–1 / 6–4	170th
40	8 May 2016	(Spain) Barcelona	Master	(Brazil) Pablo Lima	(Argentina) Cristian Gutiérrez (Spain) Juan Martín Díaz	6–2 / 6–3	171st
41	29 May 2016	(Spain) Las Rozas de Madrid	Open	(Brazil) Pablo Lima	(Spain) Paquito Navarro (Argentina) Sanyo Gutiérrez	6–1 / 6–2	172nd
42	26 June 2016	(Spain) Palma de Mallorca	Open	(Brazil) Pablo Lima	(Argentina) Cristian Gutiérrez (Spain) Juan Martín Díaz	7–6 / w.o	173rd
43	10 July 2016	(Spain) Valladolid	Open	(Brazil) Pablo Lima	(Spain) Paquito Navarro (Argentina) Sanyo Gutiérrez	7–6 / 7–5	174th
44	31 July 2016	(Spain) Gran Canaria	Open	(Brazil) Pablo Lima	(Spain) Paquito Navarro (Argentina) Sanyo Gutiérrez	6–0 / 6–4	175th
45	28 August 2016	(Spain) La Nucia	Open	(Brazil) Pablo Lima	(Argentina) Sanyo Gutiérrez (Spain) Paquito Navarro	w.o.	—
46	11 September 2016	(Monaco) Monte Carlo	Master	(Brazil) Pablo Lima	(Argentina) Maxi Sánchez (Spain) Matías Díaz	6–3 / 6–2	176th
47	25 September 2016	(Spain) Seville	Open	(Brazil) Pablo Lima	(Spain) Paquito Navarro (Argentina) Sanyo Gutiérrez	6–4 / 6–2	177th
48	16 October 2016	(Spain) La Coruña	Open	(Brazil) Pablo Lima	(Spain) Paquito Navarro (Argentina) Sanyo Gutiérrez	6–7 / 6–4 / 6–3	178th
49	30 October 2016	(Spain) Zaragoza	Open	(Brazil) Pablo Lima	(Argentina) Maxi Sánchez (Spain) Matías Díaz	6–1 / 6–2	179th
50	13 November 2016	(Argentina) Buenos Aires	Master	(Brazil) Pablo Lima	(Spain) Paquito Navarro (Argentina) Sanyo Gutiérrez	6–3 / 6–7 / 6–3	180th
51	4 December 2016	(Spain) San Sebastián	Open	(Brazil) Pablo Lima	(Spain) Paquito Navarro (Argentina) Sanyo Gutiérrez	6–2 / 6–4	181st
52	2 April 2017	(Spain) Santander	Open	(Brazil) Pablo Lima	(Argentina) Sanyo Gutiérrez (Spain) Paquito Navarro	6–4 / 4–6 / 6–7	—
53	30 April 2017	(United States) Miami	Master	(Brazil) Pablo Lima	(Argentina) Sanyo Gutiérrez (Spain) Paquito Navarro	6–7 / 3–6	—
54	14 May 2017	(Spain) La Coruña	Open	(Brazil) Pablo Lima	(Spain) Paquito Navarro (Argentina) Sanyo Gutiérrez	7–5 / 6–3	182nd
55	4 June 2017	(Spain) Barcelona	Master	(Brazil) Pablo Lima	(Spain) Paquito Navarro (Argentina) Sanyo Gutiérrez	6–3 / 6–1	183rd
56	25 June 2017	(Spain) Valladolid	Open	(Brazil) Pablo Lima	(Argentina) Sanyo Gutiérrez (Spain) Paquito Navarro	w.o.	—
57	27 August 2017	(Spain) Alicante	Open	(Brazil) Pablo Lima	(Spain) Paquito Navarro (Argentina) Sanyo Gutiérrez	6–3 / 3–6 / 6–3	184th
58	10 September 2017	(Spain) Seville	Open	(Brazil) Pablo Lima	(Argentina) Sanyo Gutiérrez (Spain) Paquito Navarro	4–6 / 2–6	—
59	24 September 2017	(Portugal) Lisbon	Master	(Brazil) Pablo Lima	(Spain) Paquito Navarro (Argentina) Sanyo Gutiérrez	6–2 / 1–6 / 6–1	185th
60	1 October 2017	Andorra La Vieja	Open	(Brazil) Pablo Lima	(Argentina) Sanyo Gutiérrez (Spain) Paquito Navarro	6–3 / 4–6 / 4–6	—
61	15 October 2017	(Spain) Granada	Open	(Brazil) Pablo Lima	(Spain) Paquito Navarro (Argentina) Sanyo Gutiérrez	7–6 / 6–1	186th
62	29 October 2017	(Spain) Zaragoza	Open	(Brazil) Pablo Lima	(Argentina) Maxi Sánchez (Spain) Matías Díaz	6–4 / 6–2	187th
63	12 November 2017	(Argentina) Buenos Aires	Master	(Brazil) Pablo Lima	(Spain) Paquito Navarro (Argentina) Sanyo Gutiérrez	6–1 / 7–6	188th
64	26 November 2017	(Spain) Bilbao	Open	(Brazil) Pablo Lima	(Spain) Matías Díaz (Argentina) Maxi Sánchez	6–7 / 6–4 / 1–6	—
65	17 December 2017	(Spain) Madrid Master Final	Master Final	(Brazil) Pablo Lima	(Argentina) Maxi Sánchez (Spain) Matías Díaz	6–3 / 6–2	189th
66	8 April 2018	(Spain) Alicante	Open	(Brazil) Pablo Lima	(Argentina) Franco Stupaczuk (Argentina) Cristian Gutiérrez	7–6 / 3-0 / w.o.	190th
67	8 July 2018	(Spain) Valencia	Master	(Brazil) Pablo Lima	(Argentina) Maxi Sánchez (Argentina) Sanyo Gutiérrez	6–0 / 6–2	191st
68	29 July 2018	(Sweden) Bastad	Open	(Brazil) Pablo Lima	(Spain) Paquito Navarro (Spain) Juan Martín Díaz	6–2 / 3–6 / 6–3	192nd
69	16 December 2018	(Spain) Madrid	Master Final	(Brazil) Pablo Lima	(Argentina) Maxi Sánchez (Argentina) Sanyo Gutiérrez	7–6^{(?)} / 6–3	193rd
70	28 April 2019	(Spain) Alicante	Open	(Brazil) Pablo Lima	(Spain) Juan Lebrón (Spain) Paquito Navarro	6–3 / 6–7 / 2–6	—
71	9 June 2019	(Argentina) Buenos Aires	Master	(Brazil) Pablo Lima	(Spain) Juani Mieres (Spain) Alejandro Galán	5–5 / w.o.	—
72	8 September 2019	(Spain) Madrid	Master	(Argentina) Agustín Tapia	(Argentina) Maxi Sánchez (Argentina) Sanyo Gutiérrez	6–4 / 6–4	194th
73	22 December 2019	(Spain) Barcelona	Master Final	(Argentina) Agustín Tapia	(Brazil) Pablo Lima (Spain) Alejandro Galán	6–7 / 3–6	—
74	19 July 2020	(Spain) Madrid II	Open	(Argentina) Agustín Tapia	(Spain) Juan Lebrón (Spain) Alejandro Galán	6–4 / 1–6 / 4–6	—
75	13 September 2020	(Italy) Cagliari	Open	(Argentina) Agustín Tapia	(Spain) Javier Ruiz (Spain) Uri Botello	6–1 / 6–4	195th
76	27 September 2020	(Spain) Mahón	Open	(Argentina) Agustín Tapia	(Argentina) Franco Stupaczuk (Argentina) Sanyo Gutiérrez	3–6 / 5–7	—
77	13 December 2020	(Spain) Menorca Master Final	Master Final	(Argentina) Agustín Tapia	(Spain) Alejandro Galán (Spain) Juan Lebrón	6–3 / 7–6^{(11)}	196th
78	11 April 2021	(Spain) Madrid	Open	(Argentina) Sanyo Gutiérrez	(Argentina) Franco Stupaczuk (Spain) Álex Ruiz	6–7^{(2)} / 6–4 / 6–3	197th
79	16 May 2021	(Spain) Vigo	Open	(Argentina) Sanyo Gutiérrez	(Argentina) Martín Di Nenno (Spain) Paquito Navarro	4–6 / 6–4 / 6–2	198th
80	11 July 2021	(Spain) Valencia	Open	(Argentina) Sanyo Gutiérrez	(Spain) Alejandro Galán (Spain) Juan Lebrón	7–5 / 3–6 / 6–4	199th
81	25 July 2021	(Spain) Las Rozas de Madrid	Open	(Argentina) Sanyo Gutiérrez	(Argentina) Agustín Tapia (Brazil) Pablo Lima	1–6 / 4–6	—
82	27 February 2022	(United States) Miami	Open	(Spain) Arturo Coello	(Brazil) Lucas Campagnolo (Spain) Javi Garrido	6–3 / 7–6^{(3)}	200th
83	26 June 2022	(Spain) Valladolid	Master	(Spain) Arturo Coello	(Spain) Alejandro Galán (Spain) Juan Lebrón	4–6 / 6–7	—
84	25 September 2022	(Spain) Madrid	Master	(Spain) Arturo Coello	(Spain) Álex Ruiz (Spain) Momo González	6–4 / 6–2	201st
85	2 October 2022	(Netherlands) Amsterdam	Open	(Spain) Arturo Coello	(Argentina) Franco Stupaczuk (Brazil) Pablo Lima	6–2 / 7–5	202nd
86	9 October 2022	(Spain) Santander	Open	(Spain) Arturo Coello	(Argentina) Martín Di Nenno (Spain) Paquito Navarro	2–6 / 0–6	—
87	20 November 2022	(Argentina) Buenos Aires	Master	(Spain) Arturo Coello	(Spain) Alejandro Galán (Spain) Juan Lebrón	6–7 / 2–6	—

=== Premier Padel ===
Win Loss

==== Finals ====
N.º	Year	Tournament	Category	Partner	Opponents in the final	Result	Career Title No.
1.	14 August 2022	(Argentina) Mendoza	P1	(Spain) Arturo Coello	(Argentina) Franco Stupaczuk (Brazil) Pablo Lima	2–6 / 6–4 / 6–7	—
2.	4 December 2022	(Mexico) Monterrey	Major	(Spain) Arturo Coello	(Argentina) Agustín Tapia (Argentina) Sanyo Gutiérrez	6–3 / 3–6 / 6–3	203rd
3.	5 March 2023	(Qatar) Doha	Major	(Argentina) Sanyo Gutiérrez	(Argentina) Franco Stupaczuk (Argentina) Martín Di Nenno	2–6 / 6–7^{(5)}	—

=== Mundial ===
- 2002 World Padel Championship
- 2004 World Padel Championship
- 2006 World Padel Championship
- 2014 World Padel Championship
- 2016 World Padel Championship
- 2022 World Padel Championship

== Biography ==
In 2015, on the same day as Sant Jordi's Day, Fernando Belasteguín released his biography, titled Esta es mi historia (This is my story), with a prologue written by football player Andrés Iniesta and written by Valen Bailon. The book also has a charitable purpose, as its profits were announced to be donated to various charitable causes:

- Ronald McDonald Children's Foundation Barcelona.
- Bakery “The future of Pehuajó”.
- Fernando Belasteguín Special Padel School.
- Social causes

== Fernando Belasteguín Special Padel School ==
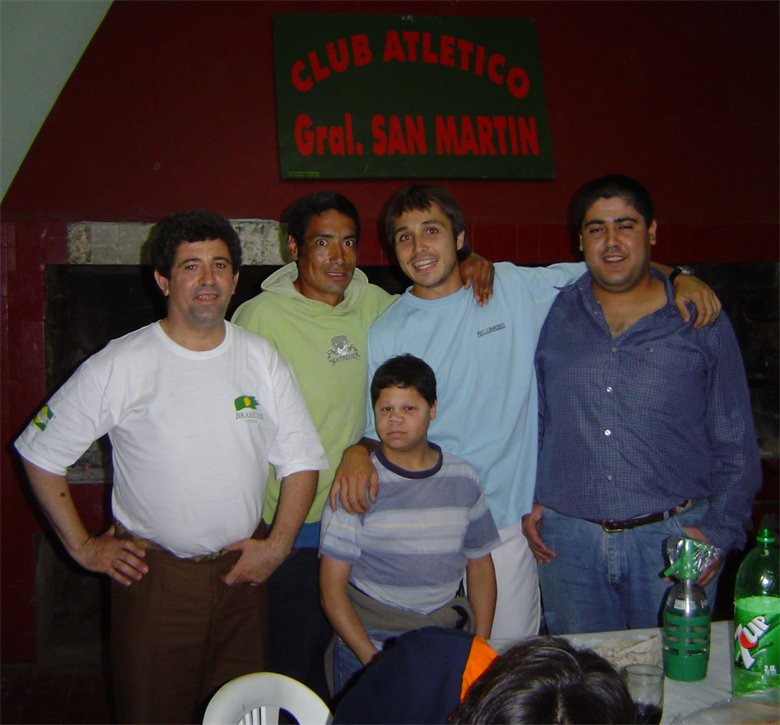
Club Gral. San Martín, Pehuajó.

The Escuela Especial de Pádel (Special Padel School) is located in the city of Bolívar, Buenos Aires, Argentina, and its goal is to show the integration and development that children achieve through sport.

== Teammates ==
Fernando Belasteguín has played with 15 different teammates and has won titles with most of them.

- Godo Diaz (1993)
- Mati Diaz (1994–1998)
- Roby Gattiker (1999)
- Alejandro Sanz (09/1999)
- Guillermo Demianiuk (2000)
- Pablo Semprún (04/2001–10/2001)
- Juan Martín Díaz (2001–2014)
- Pablo Lima (2015–2019)
- Guillermo Lahoz (2015), while Lima was injured
- Agustín Tapia (08/2019 – 12/2020)
- Sanyo Gutiérrez (04/2021 – 09/2021)
- Arturo Coello (10/2021 – 12/2022)
- Sanyo Gutiérrez (01/2023 – 04/2023)
- Mike Yanguas (04/2023 – 12/2023)
- Luciano Capra (02/2024 – 04/2024)
- Juan Tello (04/2024 – 09/2024)
- Valentino Libaak (09/2024 – 12/2024)

== Sources ==
- Belasteguin. "Sitio Web Oficial" (in Spanish).
