= 2022 Ooredoo Qatar Major =

Padel championships

- Date: 28 March – 2 April
- Edition: 1st
- Category: Major
- Prize money: € 525,000
- Location: Doha, Qatar
- Venue: Khalifa Complex

Champions
- Men's doubles: (Argentina) Martin Di Nenno (Spain) Paquito Navarro

Chronology

The 2022 Ooredoo Qatar Major was the first tournament organized by Premier Padel, promoted by the International Padel Federation, and with the financial backing of Nasser Al-Khelaïfi's Qatar Sports Investments.

Before the start of the competition, there were several conflicts between the World Padel Tour and the circuit top players, as they also wanted to play in Premier Padel.

Paquito Navarro and Martín Di Nenno, World Padel Tour's number 2 ranked team, defeated Alejandro Galán and Juan Lebrón in the final, becoming the first team to be crowned champions in the new circuit.

== Seeds ==
1. (Spain) Alejandro Galán / (Spain) Juan Lebrón (final)
2. (Argentina) Martin Di Nenno / (Spain) Paquito Navarro (final)
3. (Spain) Alex Ruiz / (Argentina) Franco Stupaczuk (semifinals)
4. (Argentina) Federico Chingotto / (Argentina) Juan Tello (semifinals)
5. (Argentina) Maxi Sanchéz / (Brazil) Pablo Lima (round of 16)
6. (Spain) Arturo Coello / (Argentina) Fernando Belasteguín (quarter-finals)
7. (Argentina) Agustin Gutiérrez / (Argentina) Sanyo Gutiérrez (second round)
8. (Spain) Javier Ruiz / (Argentina) Lucho Capra (quarter-finals)

Click on the seed number of a player to go to their draw section.

== Draw ==
=== Finals ===
Round of 32
1	(Spain) Galán / (Spain) Lebrón	6	6	6
(France) B. Tison / (Spain) T. Zapata	7	2	2
(Argentina) C. Gutiérrez / (Sweden) D. Windahl	6	6
(Spain) E. Alonso / (Spain) J. Moya	4	3
(Spain) Coki / (Spain) Yanguas	6	7
(Spain) J. Serrano / (Chile) J. Valdés	4	6
(Spain) A. Cépero / (Spain) S. Sánchez (Spain)	2	6
6	(Spain) Coello / (Argentina) Belasteguín	6	7
4	(Argentina) Chingotto / (Argentina) J. Tello	6	7
(Spain) A. Bassas / (Spain) D. Gil	0	5
(Spain) J.G. Diestro / (Spain) P. Fernandéz	6	2
(Spain) J. Rico / (Spain) V. Ruiz	7	6
(Argentina) J.C. Belluati / (Argentina) R. Moyano	6	6
(Spain) C. Rocafort / (Spain) G. Campos	0	3
(Argentina) D. Perino / (Spain) R. Rivera	2	2
8	(Spain) J. Ruíz / (Argentina) L. Capra	6	6
5	(Argentina) Maxi / (Brazil) Lima	6	6
WC	(Argentina) A. Domínguez / (Spain) F. Melendez	2	3
(Spain) J. Mouliáa / (Spain) P.V. Castillo	2	2
(Spain) J. Garrido / (Brazil) L. Campagnolo	6	6
(Spain) A. Arroyo / (Spain) I. Ramirez	6	6
(Spain) A. Luque / (Spain) M. del Castillo	4	4
(Spain) J.G. Mora / (Spain) R. Durán	2	1
3	(Spain) A. Ruiz / (Argentina) Stupaczuk	6	6
7	(Argentina) A. Gutiérrez / (Argentina) Sanyo	4	6
(Spain) I. Vilariño / (Spain) J. Rodriguez	6	7
(Argentina) A. Patiniotis / (Argentina) M. Diaz	2	4
(Spain) Momo / (Spain) J. Rico	6	6
(Spain) F. Gil / (Argentina) A. Silingo	2	6	6
(Spain) I. Zaratiegui / (Brazil) L. Bergamini	6	3	0
(Spain) M. Ortega / (Spain) J. Martinez	1	2
2	(Argentina) Di Nenno / (Spain) Paquito	6	6

Round of 16
1	(Spain) Galán/ (Spain) Lebrón	6	6
(Argentina) C. Gutiérrez / (Sweden) D. Windahl	3	4
(Spain) Coki / (Spain) Yanguas	1	5
6	(Spain) Coello / (Argentina) Belasteguín	6	7
4	(Argentina) Chingotto / (Argentina) J. Tello	6	6
(Spain) J. Rico / (Spain) V. Ruiz	3	2
(Argentina) J.C. Belluati / (Argentina) R. Moyano	3	4
8	(Spain) J. Ruíz / (Argentina) L. Capra	6	6
5	(Argentina) Maxi / (Brazil) Lima	4	6	3
(Spain) J. Garrido / (Brazil) L. Campagnolo	6	3	6
(Spain) A. Arroyo / (Spain) I. Ramirez	3	6
3	(Spain) A. Ruiz / (Argentina) Stupaczuk	6	7
(Spain) I. Vilariño / (Spain) J. Rodriguez	2	1
(Spain) Momo / (Spain) J. Rico	6	6
(Spain) F. Gil / (Argentina) A. Silingo	1	2
2	(Argentina) Di Nenno / (Spain) Paquito	6	6

Quarterfinals
1	(Spain) Galán / (Spain) Lebrón	6	7
6	(Spain) Coello / (Argentina) Belasteguín	3	5
4	(Argentina) Chingotto / (Argentina) J. Tello	6	7
8	(Argentina) L. Capra / (Spain) V. Ruíz	3	6
(Spain) J. Garrido / (Brazil) L. Campagnolo	6	4
3	(Spain) A. Ruiz/ (Argentina) Stupaczuk	7	6
(Spain) Momo / (Spain) J. Rico	1	3
2	(Argentina) Di Nenno / (Spain) Paquito	6	6

Semifinals
1	(Spain) Galán / (Spain) Lebrón	6	6
4	(Argentina) Chingotto / (Argentina) J. Tello	4	3
3	(Spain) A. Ruiz / (Argentina) Stupaczuk	2	3
2	(Argentina) Di Nenno / (Spain) Paquito	6	6

Final
1	(Spain) Galán / (Spain) Lebrón	3	6
2	(Argentina) Di Nenno / (Spain) Paquito	6	7

=== First Round ===
Date	Winners	Score	Opponent	Refs.
28/3/2022	(France) Benjamin Tison (Spain) Teodoro Zapata	6–4 / 6–4	(Spain) Enrique Goenaga (Spain) Victor Mena Gil	
28/3/2022	(Argentina) Cristian German Gutiérrez (Sweden) Daniel Windahl	6–0 / 6–0	(Qatar) Abdullah Alhijji (Qatar) Abdullah Alhijji	
28/3/2022	(Spain) Eduardo Alonso (Spain) Jesus Moya	4–6 / 6–4 / 6–3	(Spain) Miguel García (Spain) Fran Ramirez	
28/3/2022	(Spain) Coki Nieto (Spain) Miguel Yanguas	6–3 / 6–3	(Spain) Miguel Benítez (Spain) Sergio Icardo	
28/3/2022	(Spain) Jose David Sanchez Serrano (Chile) Javier Valdés	6–4 / 7–6	(Spain) Anton Sans (Spain) Christian Fuster	
28/3/2022	(Spain) Alvaro Cépero (Spain) Sergio Alba Sánchez	4–6 / 6–2 / 6–1	(Spain) Arnau Ayats (Spain) Jaime Muñoz	
28/3/2022	(Spain) Aitor Bassas (Spain) Diego Gil	6–3 / 6–	(Spain) Adrian Ronco (Spain) Jaime Menendez	
28/3/2022	(Spain) José Garcia Diestro (Spain) Pincho Fernandéz	7–5 / 6–1	(Argentina) Ignacio Sager (France) Thomas Leygue	
28/3/2022	(Spain) José Rico (Spain) Victor Ruiz	4–6 / 6–4 / 6–4	(Spain) Gonzalo Rubio (Spain) Jorge Ruiz	
28/3/2022	(Argentina) Juan Cruz Belluati (Argentina) Ramiro Moyano	7–6 / 6–1	(Italy) Daniele Cattaneo (Italy) Riccardo Sinicropi	
28/3/2022	(Spain) Cayetano Rocafort (Spain) Gaspar Campos	6–1 / 6–2	(Qatar) Jabor Al Mutawa (Qatar) Mohammed Al Khanji	
28/3/2022	(Argentina) Denis Perino (Spain) Rubén Rivera	6–2 / 6–2	(Qatar) Abdulaziz Saadon (Qatar) Mohammed Saadon	
28/3/2022	(Spain) Alvaro Melendez (Argentina) Facundo Domínguez	6–2 / 6–4	(Brazil) Chico Gomes (Spain) R. Martinez Sanchez	
28/3/2022	(Spain) J. Mouliáa Lopez (Spain) Pedro Vera Castillo	3–6 / 6–4 / 7–6	(Argentina) Godo Díaz (Argentina) Marcelo Capitani	
28/3/2022	(Spain) Javi Garrido (Brazil) Lucas Campagnolo	6–1 / 6–2	(Spain) Carlos Perez Cabeza (Argentina) Emiliano iriart	
28/3/2022	(Spain) Alejandro Arroyo (Spain) Ivan Ramirez	7–5 / 6–4	(Spain) Aday Santana (Argentina) Nicolás Suescun	
28/3/2022	(Spain) Antonio Luque (Spain) Mario Del Castillo	6–1 / 6–2	(Spain) Cristobal García (Spain) PedroMeléndez	
28/3/2022	(Spain) Javier García Mora (Spain) Raúl Marcos Durán	2–6 / 6–1 / 6–2	(Spain) Ernesto Moreno (Spain) Miguel Solbes	
28/3/2022	(Spain) Gonzalez Rodriguez (Spain) Ignacio Vilariño	7–6 / 6–3	(Spain) Javi Leal Pérez (Spain) Miguel Semmler	
28/3/2022	(Argentina) Aris Patiniotis (Argentina) Matí Diaz	6–4 / 6–2	(Spain) Alonso Rodriguez (Spain) Pablo Cardona	
28/3/2022	(Spain) Momo Gonzalez (Spain) Javi Rico	6–0 / 5–7 / 6–1	(Spain) Marc Quilez (Spain) Toni Bueno	
28/3/2022	(Argentina) Agustin Gomez Silingo (Spain) Francisco Gil	3–2 / W.O.	(France) Adrien Maigret (France) Jerome Inzerillo	
28/3/2022	(Spain) Iñigo Zaratiegui (Brazil) Lucas Bergamini	6–2 / 4–6 / 6–4	(Spain) David Fernández (Spain) Luis Pozo Carballo	
28/3/2022	(Spain) Mario Ortega (Spain) Jose Martinez	7–6 / 7–6	(Spain) Javier Gonzalez Barahona (Spain) Juanlu Esbri	

=== Round of 32 ===
Date	Winners	Score	Opponent	Refs.
29/3/2022	(Spain) Alejandro Galán (Spain) Juan Lebrón	6–7 / 6–2 / 6–2	(France) Benjamin Tison (Spain) Teodoro Zapata	
29/3/2022	(Argentina) Cristian German Gutiérrez (Sweden) Daniel Windahl	6–4 / 6–3	(Spain) Eduardo Alonso (Spain) Jesus Moya	
29/3/2022	(Spain) Coki Nieto (Spain) Miguel Yanguas	6–4 / 7–6	(Spain) Jose David Sanchez Serrano (Chile) Javier Valdés	
29/3/2022	(Spain) Arturo Coello (Argentina) Fernando Belasteguín	6–2 / 7–6	(Spain) Alvaro Cépero (Spain) Sergio Alba Sánchez	
29/3/2022	(Argentina) Federico Chingotto (Argentina) Juan Tello	6–0 / 7–5	(Spain) Aitor Bassas (Spain) Diego Gil	
29/3/2022	(Spain) José Rico (Spain) Victor Ruiz	7–6 / 6–2	(Spain) José Garcia Diestro (Spain) Pincho Fernandéz	
29/3/2022	(Argentina) Juan Cruz Belluati (Argentina) Ramiro Moyano	6–0 / 6–3	(Spain) Cayetano Rocafort (Spain) Gaspar Campos	
29/3/2022	(Spain) Javier Ruiz (Argentina) Lucho Capra	6–2 / 6–2	(Argentina) Denis Perino (Spain) Rubén Rivera	
29/3/2022	(Argentina) Maxi Sánchez (Brazil) Pablo Lima	6–2 / 6–3	(Spain) Alvaro Melendez (Argentina) Facundo Domínguez	
29/3/2022	(Spain) Javi Garrido (Brazil) Lucas Campagnolo	6–2 / 6–2	(Spain) J. Mouliáa Lopez (Spain) Pedro Vera Castillo	
29/3/2022	(Spain) Alejandro Arroyo (Spain) Ivan Ramirez	6–4 / 6–4	(Spain) Antonio Luque (Spain) Mario Del Castillo	
29/3/2022	(Spain) Alex Ruiz (Argentina) Franco Stupaczuk	6–2 / 6–1	(Spain) Javier García Mora (Spain) Raúl Marcos Durán	
29/3/2022	(Spain) Gonzalez Rodriguez (Spain) Ignacio Vilariño	6–4 / 7–6	(Argentina) Agustin Gutierrez (Argentina) Sanyo Gutiérrez	
29/3/2022	(Spain) Momo Gonzalez (Spain) Javi Rico	6–2 / 6–4	(Argentina) Aris Patiniotis (Argentina) Matí Diaz	
29/3/2022	(Argentina) Agustin Gomez Silingo (Spain) Francisco Gil	2–6 / 6–3 / 6–0	(Spain) Iñigo Zaratiegui (Brazil) Lucas Bergamini	
29/3/2022	(Argentina) Martin Di Nenno (Spain) Paquito Navarro	6–1 / 6–2	(Spain) Mario Ortega (Spain) Jose Martinez	

=== Round of 16 ===
Date	Winners	Score	Opponent	Refs.
30/3/2022	(Spain) Alejandro Galán (Spain) Juan Lebrón	6–3 / 6–4	(Argentina) Cristian German Gutiérrez (Sweden) Daniel Windahl	
30/3/2022	(Spain) Arturo Coello (Argentina) Fernando Belasteguín	6–1 / 7–5	(Spain) Coki Nieto (Spain) Miguel Yanguas	
30/3/2022	(Argentina) Federico Chingotto (Argentina) Juan Tello	6–3 / 6–2	(Spain) José Rico (Spain) Victor Ruiz	
30/3/2022	(Spain) Javier Ruiz (Argentina) Lucho Capra	6–3 / 6–4	(Argentina) Juan Cruz Belluati (Argentina) Ramiro Moyano	
30/3/2022	(Spain) Javi Garrido (Brazil) Lucas Campagnolo	6–4 / 3–6 / 6–3	(Argentina) Maxi Sánchez (Brazil) Pablo Lima	
30/3/2022	(Spain) Alex Ruiz (Argentina) Franco Stupaczuk	6–3 / 7–6	(Spain) Alejandro Arroyo (Spain) Ivan Ramirez	
30/3/2022	(Spain) Momo Gonzalez (Spain) Javi Rico	6–2 / 6–1	(Spain) Gonzalez Rodriguez (Spain) Ignacio Vilariño	
30/3/2022	(Argentina) Martin Di Nenno (Spain) Paquito Navarro	6–1 / 6–2	(Argentina) Agustin Gomez Silingo (Spain) Francisco Gil	

=== Quarter-Finals ===
Date	Winners	Score	Opponent	Refs.
31/3/2022	(Spain) Alejandro Galán (Spain) Juan Lebrón	6–3 / 7–5	(Spain) Arturo Coello (Argentina) Fernando Belasteguín	
31/3/2022	(Argentina) Federico Chingotto (Argentina) Juan Tello	6–3 / 7–6	(Spain) Javier Ruiz (Argentina) Lucho Capra	
31/3/2022	(Spain) Alex Ruiz (Argentina) Franco Stupaczuk	7–6 / 6–4	(Spain) Javi Garrido (Brazil) Lucas Campagnolo	
31/3/2022	(Argentina) Martin Di Nenno (Spain) Paquito Navarro	6–1 / 6–3	(Spain) Momo Gonzalez (Spain) Javi Rico	

=== Semi-Finals ===
Date	Winners	Score	Opponent	Refs.
1/4/2022	(Spain) Alejandro Galán (Spain) Juan Lebrón	6–4 / 6–3	(Argentina) Federico Chingotto (Argentina) Juan Tello	
1/4/2022	(Argentina) Martin Di Nenno (Spain) Paquito Navarro	6–2 / 6–3	(Spain) Alex Ruiz (Argentina) Franco Stupaczuk	

=== Finals ===
Date	Winners	Score	Opponent	Refs.
2/4/2022	(Argentina) Martin Di Nenno (Spain) Paquito Navarro	6–3 / 7–6	(Spain) Alejandro Galán (Spain) Juan Lebrón	

== Points and prize money ==
=== Points and money distribution ===
Below is a series of tables showing the ranking points and money a player can earn.

Event	First round	Second Round	Round of 16	QF	SF	F	W
Points	40	90	180	360	750	1200	2000
Money	€1500	€2900	€5250	€8500	€13000	€23600	€47300
