= 2018 WPT Argentina Master =

World Padel Tour tournament held in Buenos Aires, Argentina

- Date: 5 – 11 November 2018
- Edition: 5th (Note: The first edition was held in Cordóba and the second in Rio Gallegos, both as Open's.)
- Category: Master
- Location: Buenos Aires, Argentina
- Venue: La Rural

Champions
- Men's doubles: (Argentina) Maxi Sánchez (Argentina) Sanyo Gutiérrez

Chronology
Previous
World Pairs Cup
(FIP)
Next
Murcia Open

The 2018 Argentina Master (officially 2018 World Padel Tour Argentina Master) was the fifteenth tournament of the sixth season organized by World Padel Tour, the most prestigious padel circuit at the time.

For the second time this season, just as at the Swedish Open, the tournament did not feature a women's draw.

In the men's category, world number ones Maxi Sánchez and Sanyo Gutiérrez reached their tenth final of the season (out of 14 possible), where they faced Adrián Allemandi and Agustín Gómez Silingo, who were making their first final appearance in years (three years for Allemandi, six for Silingo). In the battle for the title, Maxi and Sanyo defeated Allemandi and Silingo in three sets, securing their seventh title of the season. This victory marked the first time they won the tournament, having been defeated in the 2014 and 2015 finals (with Sanyo also in losing the finals in 2016 and 2017, alongside Paquito). It also represented their third title on Argentine soil, having won together the Buenos Aires Open in 2013, in addition to Sanyo's victory at San Luis in 2010 and Maxi's win at the Mendoza Open in 2016.

== Head-to-head record between teams ranked in the top 4 during the season ==
=== Men's ===
Record	Maxi–Sanyo	Lima–Paquito Navarro	Galán–M. Díaz	Gutiérrez–Stupaczuk	Former Pairs	J.M. Díaz–Paquito	Belasteguín–Lima	Lima–M. Jardim	Lima–Silingo
Maxi–Sanyo	—	—	2–3	3–2		5–0	0–1	—	—
Lima–Paquito	—	—	—	1–0		—	—	—	—
Galán–M. Díaz	3–2	—	—	2–2		1–2	0–1	—	—
Gutiérrez–Stupaczuk	2–3	0–1	2–2	—		—	0–1	1–0	—
Former Pairs									
J.M. Díaz–Paquito	0–5	—	2–1	—		—	0–2	—	—
Belasteguín–Lima	1–0	—	1–0	1–0		2–0	—	—	—
Lima–M. Jardim	—	—	—	0–1		—	—	—	—
Lima–Silingo	—	—	—	—		—	—	—	—

== Draws ==
=== Men's Bracket ===
Round of 32
1	(Argentina) Maxi / (Argentina) Sanyo	6	6
(Spain) Á. Cepero / (Argentina) S. Nerone	1	2
(Argentina) M. Grabiel / (Spain) P. Lijó	3	6	6
(Argentina) F. Chingotto / (Argentina) J. Tello	6	4	2
(Spain) G. Company / (Spain) R. Rivera	6	1
(Spain) A. Ruiz / (Spain) J. Garrido	7	6
(Spain) J. Rico / (Spain) V. Ruiz	6	4	3
(Spain) J. Mieres / (Argentina) M. Lamperti	3	6	6
(Argentina) L. Capra / (Argentina) R. Moyano	6	6
(Uruguay) D. Ramos / (Spain) R. Méndez	3	1
Q	(Spain) J. Barahona / (Argentina) J. Vázquez	1	2
(Argentina) F. Quiles / (Brazil) F. Gomes	6	6
Q	(Spain) Coki / (Spain) J. Rico	6	6
(Argentina) F. Poggi / (Brazil) M. Jardim	4	0
Q	(Argentina) G. Reca / (Spain) Momo	6	4
3	(Spain) J.M. Díaz / (Spain) Paquito	7	6
4	(Argentina) C. Gutiérrez / (Argentina) Stupaczuk	6	6	4
(Argentina) Di Nenno / (Argentina) J. Restivo	7	4	6
LL	(Argentina) M. Del Moral / (Argentina) R. Mariño	3	0
(Argentina) A. Allemandi / (Argentina) A. Silingo	6	6
(Argentina) G. Tamame / (Spain) N. Gadea	6	5	7
(Brazil) J. Julianoti / (Brazil) S. Flores	2	7	6
(Spain) A. Santana / (Argentina) Godo Díaz	5	5
(Argentina) J.C. Belluati / (Spain) Lebrón	7	7
(Spain) J. Ruiz / (Spain) U. Botello	6	6
Q	(Spain) J. Gutiérrez / (Spain) M. Solbes	3	2
(Spain) J. Muñoz / (Spain) W. Lahoz	2	6	4
(Spain) G. Rubio / (Spain) E. Moreno	6	3	6
(Brazil) L. Bergamini / (Brazil) L. Campagnolo	7	6
(Argentina) M. Nicoletti / (Spain) P.A. Martínez	6	3
(Spain) J.G. Diestro / (Spain) M. Piñeiro	2	7	6
2	(Spain) Galán / (Spain) M. Díaz	6	6	4

Round of 16
1	(Argentina) Maxi / (Argentina) Sanyo	7	7
(Argentina) M. Grabiel / (Spain) P. Lijó	6	6
(Spain) A. Ruiz / (Spain) J. Garrido	6	6
(Spain) J. Mieres / (Argentina) M. Lamperti	7	7
(Argentina) L. Capra / (Argentina) R. Moyano	6	1	6
(Argentina) F. Quiles / (Brazil) F. Gomes	3	6	7
(Spain) Coki / (Spain) J. Rico	1	1
3	(Spain) J.M. Díaz / (Spain) Paquito	6	4	*
4	(Argentina) Di Nenno / (Argentina) J. Restivo	6	1
(Argentina) A. Allemandi / (Argentina) A. Silingo	7	6
(Argentina) G. Tamame / (Spain) N. Gadea	6	3	3
(Argentina) J.C. Belluati / (Spain) Lebrón	3	6	6
(Spain) J. Ruiz / (Spain) U. Botello	6	6
(Spain) G. Rubio / (Spain) E. Moreno	3	3
' (Brazil) L. Bergamini / (Brazil) L. Campagnolo	6	4
(Spain) J.G. Diestro / (Spain) M. Piñeiro	7	6

Quarter-Final
1	(Argentina) Maxi / (Argentina) Sanyo	6	6
(Spain) J. Mieres / (Argentina) M. Lamperti	3	3
(Argentina) F. Quiles / (Brazil) F. Gomes	3	6
3	(Spain) J.M. Díaz / (Spain) Paquito	6	7
(Argentina) A. Allemandi / (Argentina) A. Silingo	3	6	7
(Argentina) J.C. Belluati / (Spain) Lebrón	6	4	6
(Spain) J. Ruiz / (Spain) U. Botello	7	6
(Spain) J.G. Diestro / (Spain) M. Piñeiro	6	2

Semi-Finals
1	(Argentina) Maxi / (Argentina) Sanyo	6	6
3	(Spain) J.M. Díaz / (Spain) Paquito	4	4
(Argentina) A. Allemandi / (Argentina) A. Silingo	*
(Spain) J. Ruiz / (Spain) U. Botello

Finals
1	(Argentina) Maxi / (Argentina) Sanyo	6	6	6
(Argentina) A. Allemandi / (Argentina) A. Silingo	7	4	2

== Results ==
=== Round of 32 ===
Date	Winners	Score	Opponent	Refs.
7/11/2018	(Argentina) Maxi Sánchez (Argentina) Sanyo Gutiérrez	6–1 / 6–2	(Spain) Álvaro Cepero (Argentina) Sebastián Nerone	
7/11/2018	(Argentina) Maxi Grabiel (Spain) Pablo Lijó	3–6 / 6–4 / 6–2	(Argentina) Federico Chingotto (Argentina) Juan Tello	
7/11/2018	(Spain) Alejandro Ruiz (Spain) Javi Garrido	7–6 / 6–1	(Spain) Gerard Company (Spain) Rubén Rivera	
7/11/2018	(Spain) Juani Mieres (Argentina) Miguel Lamperti	3–6 / 6–4 / 6–3	(Spain) José Rico (Spain) Víctor Ruiz	
7/11/2018	(Argentina) Lucho Capra (Argentina) Ramiro Moyano	6–3 / 6–1	(Uruguay) Diego Ramos (Spain) Rafael Méndez	
7/11/2018	(Argentina) Federico Quiles (Brazil) Francisco Gomes	6–1 / 6–2	(Spain) Javier Barahona (Argentina) Juan Manuel Vázquez	
7/11/2018	(Spain) Coki Nieto (Spain) Javi Rico	6–4 / 6–0	(Argentina) Fernando Poggi (Brazil) Marcello Jardim	
7/11/2018	(Spain) Juan Martín Díaz (Spain) Paquito Navarro	7–6 / 6–4	(Argentina) Gaby Reca (Spain) Momo González	
7/11/2018	(Argentina) Juan Manuel Restivo (Argentina) Martín Di Nenno	7–6 / 4–6 / 6–4	(Argentina) Cristian Gutiérrez (Argentina) Franco Stupaczuk	
7/11/2018	(Argentina) Adrián Allemandi (Argentina) Agustin Goméz Silingo	6–3 / 6–0	(Argentina) Matías Del Moral (Argentina) Reinaldo Mariño	
7/11/2018	(Argentina) Germán Tamame (Spain) Nacho Gadea	6–2 / 5–7 / 7–6	(Brazil) Julio Julianoti (Brazil) Stefano Flores	
7/11/2018	(Spain) Juan Cruz Belluati (Spain) Juan Lebrón	7–5 / 7–5	(Spain) Aday Santana (Argentina) Godo Díaz	
7/11/2018	(Spain) Javi Ruiz (Spain) Uri Botello	6–3 / 6–2	(Spain) Jorge Ruiz Gutiérrez (Spain) Miguel Solbes	
7/11/2018	(Spain) Gonzalo Rubio (Spain) Ernesto Moreno	6–2 / 3–6 / 6–4	(Spain) Borja Yribarren (Spain) Willy Lahoz	
7/11/2018	(Brazil) Lucas Bergamini (Brazil) Lucas Campagnolo	7–6 / 6–3	(Argentina) Matías Nicoletti (Spain) Pedro Alonso Martínez	
7/11/2018	(Spain) José García Diestro (Spain) Martin Sanchez Piñeiro	2–6 / 7–6 / 6–4	(Spain) Alejandro Galán (Spain) Matías Díaz	

=== Round of 16 ===
Date	Winners	Score	Opponent	Refs.
8/11/2018	(Argentina) Maxi Sánchez (Argentina) Sanyo Gutiérrez	7–6 / 7–6	(Argentina) Maxi Grabiel (Spain) Pablo Lijó	
8/11/2018	(Spain) Juani Mieres (Argentina) Miguel Lamperti	7–6 / 7–6	(Spain) Alejandro Ruiz (Spain) Javi Garrido	
8/11/2018	(Argentina) Federico Quiles (Brazil) Francisco Gomes	3–6 / 6–1 / 7–6	(Argentina) Lucho Capra (Argentina) Ramiro Moyano	
8/11/2018	(Spain) Juan Martín Díaz (Spain) Paquito Navarro	6–1 / 4–1 / W.O.	(Spain) Coki Nieto (Spain) Javi Rico	
8/11/2018	(Argentina) Adrián Allemandi (Argentina) Agustin Goméz Silingo	7–6 / 6–1	(Argentina) Juan Manuel Restivo (Argentina) Martín Di Nenno	
8/11/2018	(Spain) Juan Cruz Belluati (Spain) Juan Lebrón	3–6 / 6–3 / 6–3	(Argentina) Germán Tamame (Spain) Nacho Gadea	
8/11/2018	(Spain) Javi Ruiz (Spain) Uri Botello	6–3 / 6–3	(Spain) Gonzalo Rubio (Spain) Ernesto Moreno	
8/11/2018	(Spain) José García Diestro (Spain) Martin Sanchez Piñeiro	7–6 / 6–4	(Brazil) Lucas Bergamini (Brazil) Lucas Campagnolo	

=== Quarter-Finals ===
Date	Winners	Score	Opponent	Refs.
9/11/2018	(Argentina) Maxi Sánchez (Argentina) Sanyo Gutiérrez	6–3 / 6–3	(Spain) Juani Mieres (Argentina) Miguel Lamperti	
9/11/2018	(Spain) Juan Martín Díaz (Spain) Paquito Navarro	6–3 / 7–6	(Argentina) Federico Quiles (Brazil) Francisco Gomes	
9/11/2018	(Argentina) Adrián Allemandi (Argentina) Agustin Goméz Silingo	3–6 / 6–4 / 7–6	(Spain) Juan Cruz Belluati (Spain) Juan Lebrón	
9/11/2018	(Spain) Javi Ruiz (Spain) Uri Botello	7–6 / 6–2	(Spain) José García Diestro (Spain) Martin Sanchez Piñeiro	

=== Semi-Finals ===
Date	Winners	Score	Opponent	Refs.
10/11/2018	(Argentina) Maxi Sánchez (Argentina) Sanyo Gutiérrez	6–4 / 6–4	(Spain) Juan Martín Díaz (Spain) Paquito Navarro	
10/11/2018	(Argentina) Adrián Allemandi (Argentina) Agustin Goméz Silingo	W.O.	(Spain) Javi Ruiz (Spain) Uri Botello	

=== Finals ===
Date	Winners	Score	Opponent	Refs.
11/11/2018	(Argentina) Maxi Sánchez (Argentina) Sanyo Gutiérrez	6–7 / 6–4 / 6–2	(Argentina) Adrián Allemandi (Argentina) Agustin Goméz Silingo	
