= Paquito Navarro =

Spanish padel player

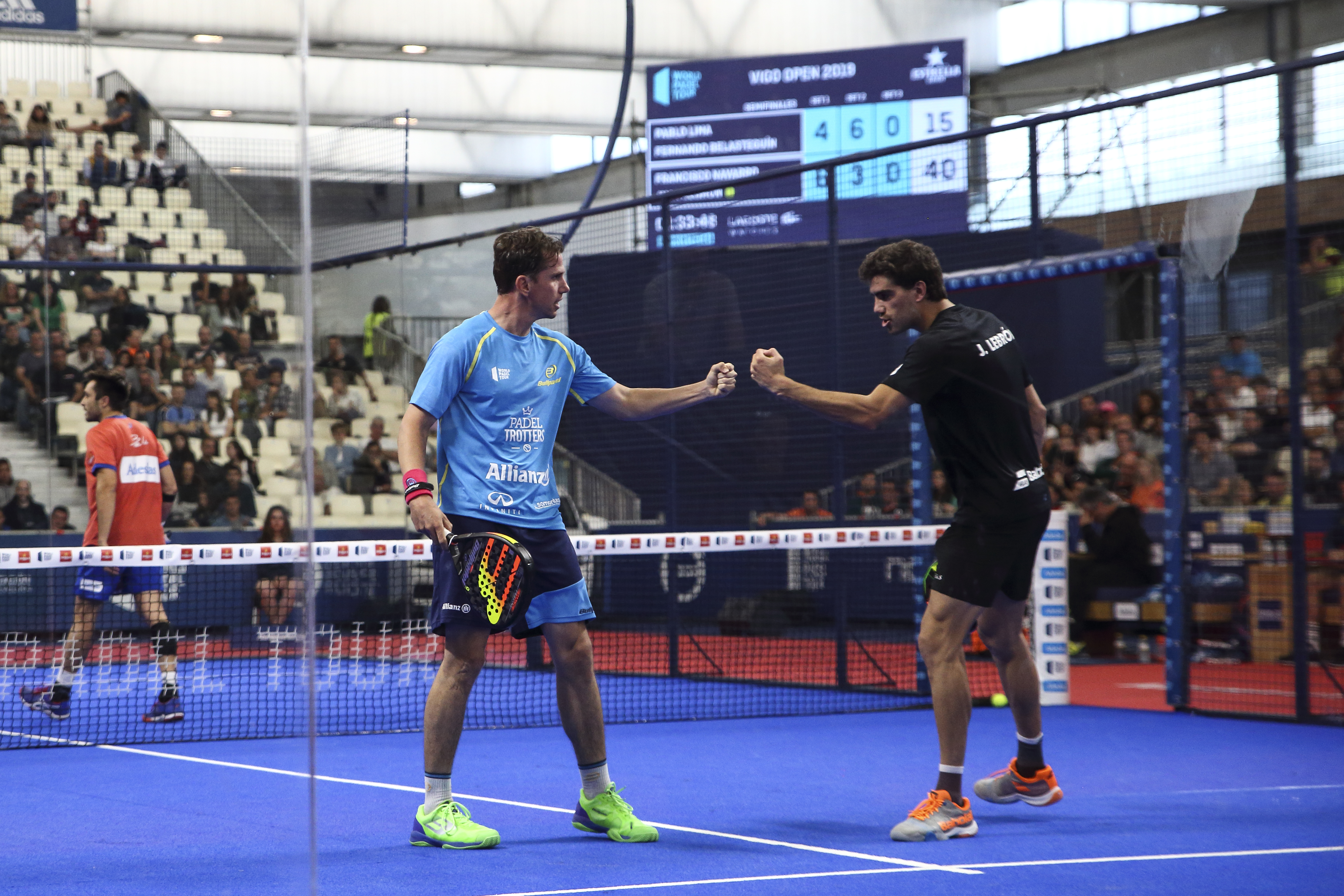

Personal information
- Full name: Francisco Jesús Navarro Compán
- Nicknames: Paquito Navarro; El Huracán del Barrio de los Remedios
- Citizenship: Spanish
- Born: 10 February 1989 (age 37) Sevilla, España
- Resting place: Madrid
- Height: 1.81 m (5 ft 11 1/2 in)

Sport
- Position: Revés (Left-side)
- Rank: 9.º (PP)
- Turned pro: 2009
- Partner: Martín Di Nenno

Achievements and titles
- Highest world ranking: 1st (2019)
- Updated on 22 August 2026

Francisco Jesús Navarro Compán (born 10 February 1989 in Sevilla, Spain), known as Paquito Navarro, is a professional Spanish padel which currently occupies the 11th position in the Premier Padel ranking. He plays on the backhand side alongside Fran Guerrero.

Paquito became world number 1 in 2019 alongside Juan Lebrón, becoming the first Spanish pair to reach the top spot in the world of padel.

== Career ==
=== Early career ===
Paquito Navarro started playing padel at the age of 5. At 9, he began competing in his first tournaments, attracting the attention of everyone who watched his game. At 10, he became the world runner-up in his age group alongside Jaime Bergareche. At 14, he played in another world championship for players his age, losing again in the final.

He competed in the next World Championship in the junior category at age 16, reaching the final again but losing once more. After this, he began training with Adrián Allemandi until he was 20 and finally broke his curse with finals by winning the Junior World Championship, which would be Paquito's last.

=== First years in World Padel Tour ===
In 2009 he joined the Padel Pro Tour, Padel's premier professional circuit, alongside Jordi Muñoz and that same year he became Spanish under-23 champion. In 2010 he started the circuit alongside Pablo Cardozo and finished alongside Pitu Losada.

In 2012, he established himself on the professional circuit alongside Adrián Allemandi, reaching two finals and playing in the Master Final. In 2013, he returned to playing with Jordi Muñoz, and in 2014 he again partnered with Adrián Allemandi and also played with Maxi Grabiel, with whom he won the Valencia Master by defeating the number one ranked pair, Fernando Belasteguín and Juan Martín Díaz, in the final.

Due to his achievements Paquito became the only Spanish player to have been crowned Spanish Champion in every category, from the youngest age groups to the senior level.

=== Breakthrough year ===
In 2015, Paquito had breakthrough year playing alongside Matías Díaz, with whom he finished as the second-best ranked pair on the circuit. They started the year knocking out the new number one ranked pair, Fernando Belasteguín and Pablo Lima, in the semi-finals on their route to win the Barcelona Master. They reached the next two tournaments finals, but lost both of them against Belasteguín and his temporary partner Willy Lahoz.

After a semi-final loss in Argentina they reached the Valladolid Open finals, but lost to Belasteguín & Lima in three sets. After three more semi-finals exits, Navarro and Díaz reached the finals of the Montecarlo Master and the Madrid Open but we're unable to win both.

In the last five tournaments of the regular season Matí and Paquito reached four semi-finals, but could not progress to any final, finishing the year with a quarter-finals loss in the Master Final. Diaz and Paquito finished the season as the second ranked pair, behind Belasteguín and Lima.

=== Partnership with Sanyo Gutiérrez ===
==== 2016 ====
However, in the 2016 season, Paquito decided to change partners and team up with Sanyo Gutiérrez, with the goal of challenging for the top ranking spot. They started their new adventure reaching the semifinals of the first tournament of the season.

In their second tournament, the Valencia Master, they bested the number 1 ranked pair, Fernando Belasteguín & Pablo Lima, in the semifinals, and in the final they defeated the Maxi Sánchez & Matías Díaz, thus winning their first tournament of the season. After a semi-final exit in the Barcelona Master, Paquito and Sanyo reached their second final of the season in the Las Rozas Open, but could not defeat the number one ranked pair.

In their next four tournaments the Spanish-Argentinian pair would reach three more finals, all of them against Belasteguín & Lima, losing the first two and achieving their second title of the season in the La Nucía Open, after the number 1 pair could not compete in the final, due to an injury of Fernando Belasteguín. In the seven last tournaments of the regular seasons they would reach five more finals, losing four of them to Belasteguín and Lima and ending the ranking race in second.

Paquito and Sanyo finsished the season winning the Master Final, after defeating Juani Mieres & Miguel Lamperti in the finals, by 6–3 and 6–4.

Also in 2016, he competed in the Padel World Championship with the Spanish national team, finishing as runners-up after losing the final 2–1 to Argentina. Paquito played his match with Juan Martín Díaz against the Argentinians Fernando Belasteguín and Sanyo Gutiérrez, losing the match 6–4, 3–6, 7–5, thus tying the tie with Argentina at one point apiece.

==== 2017 ====
In 2017, he continued his partnership with Sanyo Gutiérrez. They began the season winning the Santander Open and the Miami Master, beating the number one rankeds Fernando Belasteguín & Pablo Lima in both finals. Showing that Paquito and Sanyo Gutiérrez could pose a threat to the number 1s, in a final that would be repeated many times during the season.

Belasteguín & Lima would settle the score avenging their loss in rematches on the next two tournaments, winning the A Coruña Open and the Barcelona Master. In the fifth tournament of the season, the Valladolid Open, Sanyo and Paquito took the victory after the withdrawal before the final of the number 1 due to an injury of Fernando Belasteguín.

Neither team would reach the finals of the next two tournament, maintaining the ranking race close. They would meet again in the eighth tournament of the season, the Alicante Open, being defeated in the finals against Belasteguín & Lima in three sets. They would avenge their loss in the Seville Open, winning the title in Paquito's hometwon, and would repeat the result in Andorra, while in the meantime losing the Portugal Master to their rivals.

After a loss in the Granada Open, with three tournaments remaining, and both teams tied with ten finals contested and five titles each, the final tournaments would be crucial to the ranking race.

In the first of the remaining tournaments, held in Zaragoza, they did not reach the final, after losing in the semifinals. In the Buenos Aires Master, they reached another final, where they lost to Fernando Belasteguín & Pablo Lima, losing ground in the No. 1 Ranking race. At the Bilbao Open they lost in the semifinals against Maxi Sánchez and Matías Díaz ending their hopes of finishing the year as the number one pair. They finished the season with a quarter-finals exit in the Master Final.

=== 2018 ===
In 2018, Paquito and Sanyo decided to split, with Juan Martín Díaz becoming Paquito's new partner. In the first tournament of the season, the Catalunya Master, they were only able to reach the quarterfinals.

Their first final came in the third tournament of the season, the Zaragoza Open, where they were unable to beat Maxi Sánchez & Sanyo Gutiérrez, something that would be repetad in Jaén. Three tournaments later they reached another final, in Sweden, where they lost against Fernando Belasteguín & Pablo Lima.

During the semifinals of the eleventh tournament of the circuit, the Portugal Master, and with the score at 5–5 in the second set, Paquito crashed into a glass panel on the court and it broke, causing injuries that led to his hospitalization. Juani Mieres & Miguel Lamperti, their opponents in the semifinals thus advanced to the tournament final. Fortunately, after receiving stitches in his knees and elbows, he was discharged from the hospital the following morning.

Following his absence from the Granada Open, and after the announcement by Juan Martín Díaz that he was going to play with in Granada with Juan Lebrón, Paquito announced that his new partner until the end of the season would be Pablo Lima, since his partner, Fernando Belasteguín, was still injured and unable to play in the last tournaments of the season.

In their first tournament together they reached the final of the Euskadi Open, where they defeated Miguel Lamperti & Juani Mieres in two sets, achieving their first title as a pair. Due to already being registered to play with Juan Martín Díaz in the Argentina Master, they reached the semi-finals, where they lost to Maxi Sánchez & Sanyo Gutiérrez.

He played again with Lima at the Murcia Open, where they managed to reach the final, but were defeated by the newly crowned world number 1s, Maxi Sánchez & Sanyo Gutiérrez. He finsished the season playing the Master Final with Juan Cruz Belluati, since Fernando Belasteguín had fully recovered from his injury.

=== Partnership with Juan Lebrón ===
==== 2019 ====
For the 2019 season, Juan Lebrón became Paquito Navarro's new partner. In their first tournament of the season, the Marbella Master, they reached the final, where they fell to the number 1s, Maxi Sánchez & Sanyo Gutiérrez. They would reach the final of the next tournament, but would once again lose to Maxi & Sanyo.

Their first success came at the Alicante Open, where they defeated Paquito's long time rivals Fernando Belasteguín & Pablo Lima to win their first tournament together. They would lose again to Maxi & Sanyo at the Vigo Open, but would finally beat them to win their second title at the Jaén Open.

Despite a quarter-final loss in Argentina, Lebrón and Paquito would win the Valladolid Master and the Swedish Open, reaching the halfway of the season with seven finals and four titles, and establishing themselves as a threat to Maxi and Sanyo number one rank.

They could not repeat their results in the next five tournaments, but kept close in the ranking race due to their rivals inconsistent results. On the fourtheen Córdoba Open of the season they would reach the finals, but weren't able to win it. They would also reach and win the finals of the São Paulo Open, where after beating Agustín Tapia & Fernando Belasteguín in the semi-finals Lebrón reached the number one ranking spot, becoming along with Paquito the first Spanish pair to reach the top of the rankings.

Lebrón and Paquito would secure the number 1 ranking at the end of the season after reaching the finals of the Mexico Open, the penultimate tournament of the season. In the final they lost against Maxi Sánchez & Sanyo Gutiérrez in two sets. They would conclude the season with a semi-final exit in the Master Final.

=== Return with Pablo Lima ===
==== 2020 ====
Despite reaching the top of the rankings together, Lebrón and Paquito opted to part ways, with Lima becoming Paquito Navarro's new partner. In the first and only tournament of the 2020 before the COVID-19 break, the Marbella Master, Lima and Paquito defeated Alejandro Galán & Juan Lebrón in the final.

Three months after the shutdown, they returned to competition reaching the final of the Estrella Damm Open, in a rematch with Galán & Lebrón, which they lost in two sets. In the next six tournaments, the Spanish-Brazilian pair would reach four semi-finals but were unable to progress in any of them. Their last final together tenth tournament of the season, where do to a Lima injury they had to forfeit the last match.

The injury in Las Rozas also forced Lima to miss the Master Final, making Paquito play with Javi Rico where they lost in the quarter-finals.

=== Partnership with Martín Di Nenno ===
==== 2021 ====
For the 2021 season, Martín Di Nenno became his new partner. Together they had a difficult start of season reaching only two out of nine tournaments finals, in Vigo and Málaga Open's, losing both of them.

The pair performance would improve significantly after the summer break, starting in the Cascais Master, where they reached the semi-finals. They improved their results reaching the Sardegna Open finals. They won their first title together in the Barcelona Master, defeating Federico Chingotto & Juan Tello in the finals and surprassing Belasteguín and Sanyo in the Race standings. Despite losing against the number one ranked Alejandro Galán & Juan Lebrón in the Lugo Open finals, the good performance allowed them to surpass Fernando Belasteguín and Sanyo Gutiérrez to the second spot in the ranking.

In the last four tournaments of the season Di Nenno and Paquito reached the finals in all of them, winning the Córdoba Open and Buenos Aires Master. And so, after eight consecutive finals, they arrived at the Master Final as the number two ranked pair, with a serious chance of taking the number one spot held by Alejandro Galán & Juan Lebrón, needing to win the tournament to do so. However, they were eliminated in the semifinals after losing in two sets to Agustín Tapia & Sanyo Gutiérrez, finishing the season second in the rankings.

==== 2022 ====
In 2022, Paquito continued with Martín Di Nenno, aiming to achieve the number one ranking they were so close to, but initial results fell short of expectations. However, in the first two tournaments in Premier Padel history they were able to reach the finals, winning the first in Qatar against Galán & Lebrón. But, in the World Padel Tour, they only managed to win one tournament in the first half of the year, claiming the Vigo Open after defeating their main rivals.

After the summer break, with five consecutive tournaments ahead, Di Nenno & Paquito hoped to turn things around, just as they had done in the previous year. However, they were unable to recapture the level of play they had displayed in the autumn of 2021. At the end of September, they lost their number two ranking to Agustín Tapia & Sanyo Gutiérrez, with Arturo Coello & Fernando Belasteguín in excellent form right behind them, and after falling in the quarterfinals of the Amsterdam Open (precisely against Belasteguín & Coello, who went on to win the tournament), they announced their split as a pair on October 3.

Knowing that following tournament, would be their last together, Di Nenno & Paquito went on to play their best tournament as a pair, defeating the three most in-form pairs on the circuit in the quarterfinals, semifinals, and final, losing only six games in these three matches. They first won against Lima & Stupaczuk in the quarterfinals by a double 6–1, then in the semis against Sanyo & Tapia by the same result, and finally they beat Belasteguín and Coello (who had won 13 consecutive matches) in the final by 6–2 and 6–0, which was their "last dance" as a pair.

=== Partnership with Juan Tello ===
Paquito Navarro announced that he would play for a few weeks with Miguel Yanguas (who had separated from Coki Nieto) before switching to the drive position to play alongside Juan Tello. With the Argentinian, Paquito wanted to see if he could be a competitive player on the right side, so they decided to wait until the end of the season to decide whether it was worthwhile to continue the project together in 2023 or return to the backhand, his natural position. In the five remaining tournaments of the season, they reached two semifinals, at the Malmö Open and the Master Final, but their best result came at the Mexico Open where they won tournament.

==== 2023 ====
These positive results in the end of season led the Spanish-Argentine duo to continue the project in the 2023, starting as the number 4 ranked pair. However, the start was far from what they had hoped for. In the first four tournaments, they only won one match; they lost in the round of 32 at the Abu Dhabi Master, the La Rioja Open, and the Chile Open, and Premier Padel's Qatar Major, they fell in their second match. The only match they won, after losing the first set, they played the second set switching sides (Paquito on the backhand and Juan Tello on the forehand) and won it decisively 6–0. After being unable to compete in the Paraguay Open, Paquito announced that he and Juan Tello were separating so that the Sevillian could return to playing on the backhand side.

=== Partnership with Fede Chingotto ===
At the beginning of April, Paquito announced that his new partner was going to be Federico Chingotto, precisely the one who had played for more than 7 years with Juan Tello. Together they would reach the France and Amsterdam Open 1000 finals, losing both of them. Their biggest success came in the last tournament of World Padel Tour history, the Master Final, where they would defeat Alejandro Galán & Juan Lebrón to win their first and only title of the season.

== Honours ==
=== Padel Pro Tour (2006–2012) ===
Winner Runner-up

==== Finals ====
N.º	Date	Tournament	Partner	Result	Opponents in the final	Career title No.
2012
1.	1 July 2012	(Spain) Valladolid International	(Argentina) Tito Allemandi	4–6 / 3–6	(Argentina) Fernando Belasteguín (Spain) Juan Martín Díaz	
2.	11 November 2012	(Spain) Valencia International	(Argentina) Tito Allemandi	2–6 / 0–6	(Argentina) Maximiliano Grabiel (Argentina) Miguel Lamperti	

Tournaments won	International	Master Final	Total
Tournaments won	0	0	0

=== World Padel Tour (2013–2021) ===
Winner Runner-up

==== Finals ====
N.º	Date	Tournament	Partner	Result	Opponents in the final	Career title No.
2014
3.	3 August 2014	(Spain) Marbella Open	(Argentina) Tito Allemandi	1–6 / 7–6 / 3–6 / 4–6	(Argentina) Fernando Belasteguín (Spain) Juan Martín Díaz	
4.	9 November 2014	(Spain) Valencia Open	(Argentina) Maxi Grabiel	6–2 / 3–6 / 6–3 / 7–5	(Argentina) Fernando Belasteguín (Spain) Juan Martín Díaz	1st
5.	22 November 2014	(Spain) San Fernando Open	(Argentina) Maxi Grabiel	7–5 / 5–7 / 7–5	(Argentina) Maxi Sánchez (Argentina) Sanyo Gutiérrez	2nd
2015
6.	29 March 2015	(Spain) Barcelona Master	(Spain) Matías Díaz	6–1 / 6–2	(Argentina) David Gutiérrez (Argentina) Lucho Capra	3rd
7.	12 April 2015	(Spain) San Fernando Open	(Spain) Matías Díaz	4–6 / 3–6	(Argentina) Fernando Belasteguín (Spain) Willy Lahoz	
8.	26 April 2015	(Spain) Isla de La Palma	(Spain) Matías Díaz	2–6 / 6–7	(Argentina) Fernando Belasteguín (Spain) Willy Lahoz	
9.	21 June 2015	(Spain) Valladolid Open	(Spain) Matías Díaz	6–7 / 7–6 / 6–7	(Argentina) Fernando Belasteguín (Brazil) Pablo Lima	
10.	13 September 2015	(Monaco) Montecarlo Master	(Spain) Matías Díaz	3–6 / 1–6	(Argentina) Fernando Belasteguín (Brazil) Pablo Lima	
11.	20 September 2015	(Spain) Madrid Open	(Spain) Matías Díaz	3–6 / 6–7	(Spain) Juani Mieres (Argentina) Sanyo Gutiérrez	
2016
12.	24 April 2016	(Spain) Valencia Master	(Argentina) Sanyo Gutiérrez	7–6 / 7–6	(Argentina) Matías Díaz (Argentina) Maxi Sánchez	4th
13.	29 May 2016	(Spain) Las Rozas Open	(Argentina) Sanyo Gutiérrez	1–6 / 2–6	(Argentina) Fernando Belasteguín (Brazil) Pablo Lima	
14.	10 July 2016	(Spain) Valladolid Open	(Argentina) Sanyo Gutiérrez	6–7 / 5–7	(Argentina) Fernando Belasteguín (Brazil) Pablo Lima	
15.	31 July 2016	(Spain) Gran Canaria Open	(Argentina) Sanyo Gutiérrez	0–6 / 4–6	(Argentina) Fernando Belasteguín (Brazil) Pablo Lima	
16.	28 August 2016	(Spain) La Nucía Open	(Argentina) Sanyo Gutiérrez	WO	(Argentina) Fernando Belasteguín (Brazil) Pablo Lima	5th
17.	25 September 2016	(Spain) Seville Open	(Argentina) Sanyo Gutiérrez	4–6 / 2–6	(Argentina) Fernando Belasteguín (Brazil) Pablo Lima	
18.	16 October 2016	(Spain) A Coruña Open	(Argentina) Sanyo Gutiérrez	7–6 / 4–6 / 3–6	(Argentina) Fernando Belasteguín (Brazil) Pablo Lima	
19.	6 November 2016	(Argentina) Mendoza Open	(Argentina) Sanyo Gutiérrez	4–6 / 5–7	(Spain) Matías Díaz (Argentina) Maxi Sánchez	
20.	13 November 2016	Argentina Master	(Argentina) Sanyo Gutiérrez	3–6 / 7–6 / 3–6	(Argentina) Fernando Belasteguín (Brazil) Pablo Lima	
21.	4 December 2016	(Spain) Euskadi Open	(Argentina) Sanyo Gutiérrez	2–6 / 4–6	(Argentina) Fernando Belasteguín (Brazil) Pablo Lima	
22.	18 December 2016	(Spain) Master Final	(Argentina) Sanyo Gutiérrez	6–3 / 6–4	(Spain) Juani Mieres (Argentina) Miguel Lamperti	6th
2017
23.	2 April 2017	(Spain) Santander Open	(Argentina) Sanyo Gutiérrez	4–6 / 6–4 / 7–6	(Argentina) Fernando Belasteguín (Brazil) Pablo Lima	7th
24.	30 April 2017	(United States) Miami Master	(Argentina) Sanyo Gutiérrez	7–6 / 6–3	(Argentina) Fernando Belasteguín (Brazil) Pablo Lima	8th
25.	14 May 2017	(Spain) A Coruña Open	(Argentina) Sanyo Gutiérrez	5–7 / 3–6	(Argentina) Fernando Belasteguín (Brazil) Pablo Lima	
26.	4 June 2017	(Spain) Barcelona Master	(Argentina) Sanyo Gutiérrez	3–6 / 1–6	(Argentina) Fernando Belasteguín (Brazil) Pablo Lima	
27.	25 June 2017	(Spain) Valladolid Open	(Argentina) Sanyo Gutiérrez	WO	(Argentina) Fernando Belasteguín (Brazil) Pablo Lima	9th
28.	27 August 2017	(Spain) Alicante Open	(Argentina) Sanyo Gutiérrez	3–6 / 6–3 / 3–6	(Argentina) Fernando Belasteguín (Brazil) Pablo Lima	
29.	10 September 2017	(Spain) Seville Open	(Argentina) Sanyo Gutiérrez	6–4 / 6–2	(Argentina) Fernando Belasteguín (Brazil) Pablo Lima	10th
30.	24 September 2017	Portugal Master	(Argentina) Sanyo Gutiérrez	2–6 / 6–1 / 1–6	(Argentina) Fernando Belasteguín (Brazil) Pablo Lima	
31.	1 October 2017	Andorra Open	(Argentina) Sanyo Gutiérrez	3–6 / 6–4 / 6–4	(Argentina) Fernando Belasteguín (Brazil) Pablo Lima	11th
32.	15 October 2017	(Spain) Granada Open	(Argentina) Sanyo Gutiérrez	6–7 / 1–6	(Argentina) Fernando Belasteguín (Brazil) Pablo Lima	
33.	12 November 2017	Argentina Master	(Argentina) Sanyo Gutiérrez	1–6 / 6–7	(Argentina) Fernando Belasteguín (Brazil) Pablo Lima	
2018
34.	6 May 2018	(Spain) Zaragoza Open	(Spain) Juan Martín Díaz	4–6 / 7–6 / 3–6	(Argentina) Maxi Sánchez (Argentina) Sanyo Gutiérrez	
35.	27 May 2018	(Spain) Jaén Open	(Spain) Juan Martín Díaz	3–6 / 3–6	(Argentina) Maxi Sánchez (Argentina) Sanyo Gutiérrez	
36.	29 July 2018	(Sweden) Swedish Open	(Spain) Juan Martín Díaz	2–6 / 6–3 / 3–6	(Argentina) Fernando Belasteguín (Brazil) Pablo Lima	
37.	28 October 2018	(Spain) Euskadi Open	(Brazil) Pablo Lima	6–3 / 6–3	(Spain) Juani Mieres (Argentina) Miguel Lamperti	12th
38.	25 November 2018	(Spain) Murcia Open	(Brazil) Pablo Lima	6–2 / 5–7 / 3–6	(Argentina) Maxi Sánchez (Argentina) Sanyo Gutiérrez	
2019
39.	24 March 2019	(Spain) Marbella Master	(Spain) Juan Lebrón	1–6 / 6–7	(Argentina) Maxi Sánchez (Argentina) Sanyo Gutiérrez	
40.	14 April 2019	(Spain) Logroño Open	(Spain) Juan Lebrón	6–7 6–7	(Argentina) Maxi Sánchez (Argentina) Sanyo Gutiérrez	
41.	28 April 2019	(Spain) Alicante Open	(Spain) Juan Lebrón	3–6 / 7–6 / 6–2	(Argentina) Fernando Belasteguín (Brazil) Pablo Lima	13th
42.	12 May 2019	(Spain) Vigo Open	(Spain) Juan Lebrón	3–6 / 4–6	(Argentina) Maxi Sánchez (Argentina) Sanyo Gutiérrez	
43.	26 May 2019	(Spain) Jaén Open	(Spain) Juan Lebrón	7–5 / 6–4	(Argentina) Maxi Sánchez (Argentina) Sanyo Gutiérrez	14th
44.	23 June 2019	(Spain) Valladolid Master	(Spain) Juan Lebrón	6–7 / 6–4 / 6–4	(Spain) Alejandro Galán (Spain) Juani Mieres	15th
45.	30 June 2019	(Sweden) Swedish Open	(Spain) Juan Lebrón	6–3 / 7–6	(Argentina) Franco Stupaczuk (Spain) Matías Díaz	16th
46.	17 November 2019	(Spain) Córdoba Open	(Spain) Juan Lebrón	3–6 / 3–6	(Argentina) Franco Stupaczuk (Spain) Matías Díaz	
47.	24 November 2019	(Brazil) São Paulo Open	(Spain) Juan Lebrón	2–6 / 6–3 / 6–2	(Spain) Javier Ruiz (Spain) Uri Botello	17th
48.	1 December 2019	Mexico Open	(Spain) Juan Lebrón	7–6 / 6–7 / 2–6	(Argentina) Maxi Sánchez (Argentina) Sanyo Gutiérrez	
2020
49.	8 March 2020	(Spain) Marbella Master	(Brazil) Pablo Lima	7–6 / 2–6 / 6–3	(Spain) Alejandro Galán (Spain) Juan Lebrón	18th
50.	5 July 2020	(Spain) Estrella Damm Open	(Brazil) Pablo Lima	5–7 / 3–6	(Spain) Alejandro Galán (Spain) Juan Lebrón	
51.	22 November 2020	(Spain) Las Rozas Open	(Brazil) Pablo Lima	WO	(Argentina) Federico Chingotto (Argentina) Juan Tello	
2021
52.	16 May 2021	(Spain) Vigo Open	(Argentina) Martín Di Nenno	6–4 / 4–6 / 2–6	(Argentina) Fernando Belasteguín (Argentina) Sanyo Gutiérrez	
53.	8 August 2021	(Spain) Málaga Open	(Argentina) Martín Di Nenno	2–6 / 6–7	(Argentina) Agustín Tapia (Brazil) Pablo Lima	
54.	12 September 2021	(Italy) Sardegna Open	(Argentina) Martín Di Nenno	2–6 / 6–7	(Spain) Alejandro Ruiz (Argentina) Franco Stupaczuk	
55.	19 September 2021	(Spain) Barcelona Master	(Argentina) Martín Di Nenno	6–2 / 3–6 / 6–4	(Argentina) Federico Chingotto (Argentina) Juan Tello	19th
56.	26 September 2021	(Spain) Lugo Open	(Argentina) Martín Di Nenno	4–6 / 6–4 / 3–6	(Spain) Alejandro Galán (Spain) Juan Lebrón	
57.	10 October 2021	(Spain) Menorca Open	(Argentina) Martín Di Nenno	3–6 / 4–6	(Spain) Alejandro Galán (Spain) Juan Lebrón	
58.	24 October 2021	(Spain) Córdoba Open	(Argentina) Martín Di Nenno	6–3 / 6–3	(Spain) Alejandro Ruiz (Argentina) Franco Stupaczuk	20th
59.	14 November 2021	(Sweden) Swedish Open	(Argentina) Martín Di Nenno	5–7 / 0–6	(Argentina) Agustín Tapia (Argentina) Sanyo Gutiérrez	
60.	28 November 2021	Argentina Master	(Argentina) Martín Di Nenno	6–4 / 6–2	(Argentina) Agustín Tapia (Argentina) Sanyo Gutiérrez	21st
61.	5 December 2021	Mexico Open	(Argentina) Martín Di Nenno	3–6 / 6–3 / 2–6	(Spain) Alejandro Ruiz (Argentina) Franco Stupaczuk	
2022
62.	27 March 2022	(Spain) Vigo Open	(Argentina) Martín Di Nenno	2–6 / 6–3 / 6–4	(Spain) Alejandro Galán (Spain) Juan Lebrón	22nd
63.	10 April 2022	(Spain) Alicante Open	(Argentina) Martín Di Nenno	2–6 / 3–6	(Spain) Alejandro Galán (Spain) Juan Lebrón	
64.	10 September 2022	(Sweden) Swedish Open	(Argentina) Martín Di Nenno	7–6 / 2–6 / 1–6	(Spain) Alejandro Galán (Spain) Juan Lebrón	
65.	9 October 2022	(Spain) Santander Open	(Argentina) Martín Di Nenno	6–2 / 6–0	(Spain) Arturo Coello (Argentina) Fernando Belasteguín	23rd
66.	27 November 2022	Mexico Open	(Argentina) Juan Tello	7–6 / 1–6 / 7–5	(Argentina) Franco Stupaczuk (Brazil) Pablo Lima	24th
2023
67.	18 June 2023	France Open 1000	(Argentina) Federico Chingotto	2–6 / 4–6	(Argentina) Franco Stupaczuk (Argentina) Martín Di Nenno	
68.	15 October 2023	(Netherlands) Amsterdam Open 1000	(Argentina) Federico Chingotto	6–4 / 2–6 / 2–6	(Argentina) Franco Stupaczuk (Argentina) Martín Di Nenno	
69.	12 December 2023	(Spain) Master Final	(Argentina) Fede Chingotto	6–1 / 6–4	(Spain) Alejandro Galán (Spain) Juan Lebrón	25th

Tournaments won	Challenger	Open	Master	Master Final	Total
Tournaments won	0	16	7	2	25

=== Premier Padel (2022–Present) ===
Winner Runner-up

==== Finals ====
N.º	Date	Tournament	Partner	Result	Opponents in the final	Career title No.
2022
70.	3 April 2022	Qatar Major	(Argentina) Martín Di Nenno	6–3 / 7–6	(Spain) Alejandro Galán (Spain) Juan Lebrón	26th
71.	29 May 2022	Italy Major	(Argentina) Martín Di Nenno	6–4 / 5–7 / 4–6	(Spain) Alejandro Galán (Spain) Juan Lebrón	
72.	7 August 2022	(Spain) Madrid P1	(Argentina) Martín Di Nenno	7–5 / 2–6 / 3–6	(Spain) Alejandro Galán (Spain) Juan Lebrón	
2023
73.	16 July 2023	Italy Major	(Argentina) Federico Chingotto	5–7 / 6–7	(Argentina) Agustín Tapia (Spain) Arturo Coello	
74.	23 July 2023	(Spain) Madrid P1	(Argentina) Federico Chingotto	5–7 / 2–6	(Argentina) Agustín Tapia (Spain) Arturo Coello	
75.	10 September 2023	(France) París Major	(Argentina) Federico Chingotto	6–7 / 1–6	(Argentina) Agustín Tapia (Spain) Arturo Coello	
2025
76.	1 June 2025	(Argentina) Buenos Aires P1	(Brazil) Lucas Bergamini	2–6 / 2–6	(Argentina) Agustín Tapia (Spain) Arturo Coello	
77.	2 November 2025	(Egypt) Giza P2	(Spain) Jon Sanz	1–6 / 2–6	(Spain) Alejandro Galán (Argentina) Federico Chingotto	

Tournaments won	P2	P1	Major	PP Final	Total
Tournaments won	0	0	1	0	1

=== National Team ===
- 2010 World Championship – winner representing Spain
- 2016 World Championship – runners-up representing Spain
- 2021 World Championship – winner representing Spain
- 2022 World Championship – runners-up representing Spain
- 2024 World Championship – runners-up representing Spain
- 2026 World Championship – winner representing Spain

==== Other Titles ====
- 2010 Spanish Under-23 Champion – winner alongside Gonzalo Rubio
- 2011 Spanish Under-23 Champion – winner alongside Pedro Alonso-Martínez
- Andalusian Team Champion – representing Sato Sport
- 2011 Spanish National Championships – runner-up alongside Pitu Losada
- 2013 Champion of Spain by Autonomous Communities Teams – representing Andalucía
- 2014 Spanish National Championships – winner alongside Willy Lahoz
- 2015 Spanish National Championships – winner alongside Matías Díaz
- 2020 Spanish National Championships – winner alongside Juan Martín Díaz
