= 2019 WPT Vigo Open =

World Padel Tour tournament held in Vigo, Spain

- Date: 7 – 12 May
- Edition: 1st
- Category: Open
- Location: Vigo, Spain
- Venue: Instituto Ferial de Vigo

Champions
- Men's doubles: (Argentina) Maxi Sánchez (Argentina) Sanyo Gutiérrez
- Women's doubles: (Spain) Marta Marrero (Spain) Marta Ortega

Chronology

The 2019 Vigo Open (officially 2019 World Padel Tour Trofeo Concello de Vigo Open) was the fourth tournament of the seventh season organized by World Padel Tour, the most prestigious padel circuit at the time.

In the women's category, following an unexpected elimination in the previous tournament, the world's number 1 pair, Marta Marrero and Marta Ortega, bounced back to reach their third final of the year. There, they faced the third-ranked pair, Gemma Triay and Lucia Sainz, who were competing in their first final of the season. In the championship match, Marrero and Ortega continued their strong start to the year by defeating Gemma and Lucia in straight sets, securing their third title of the season and becoming the inaugural women's champions in Vigo. The victory in the final also made Marta Marrero to the sole leader in the rankings.

In the men's category, like in the women's, the world's number 1 pair, Maxi Sánchez and Sanyo Gutiérrez, also reached their third final of the season, where they would face their main rivals for the year, the third-ranked team, Juan Lebrón and Paquito Navarro. In the decisive match, Maxi and Sanyo defeated Lebrón and Paquito, marking the third time they had beaten them in a final, to secure their third title of the season, and the first for both of them in Vigo.

== Head-to-head record between teams ranked in the top 4 during the season ==
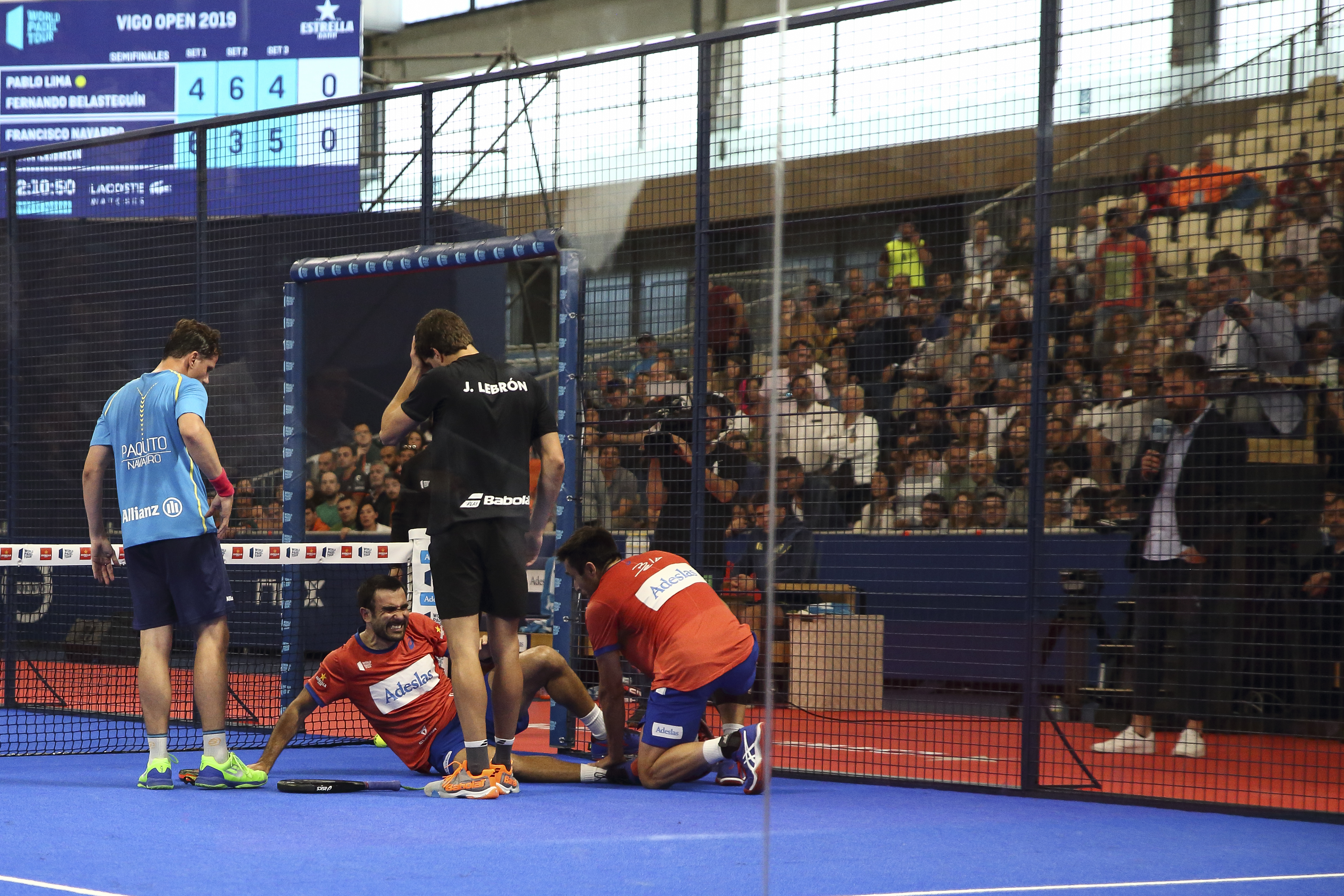
Pablo Lima receiving medical attention during his semifinal match alongside Belasteguín against Juan Lebrón and Paquito Navarro.

=== Men's ===
Record	Maxi–Sanyo	Belasteguín–Lima	Lebrón–Paquito	Galán–J. Mieres
Maxi–Sanyo	—	—	3–0	1–0
Belasteguín–Lima	—	—	0–4	—
Lebrón–Paquito	0–3	4–0	—	—
Galán–J. Mieres	0–1	—	—	—

Marta Marrer (left) and Marta Ortega, the winners of the Vigo Open.

=== Women's ===
Record	Marrero–Ortega	Ariana–Salazar	Triay–Sainz	Delfina–Majo
Marrero–Ortega	—	2–0	2–0	—
Ariana–Salazar	0–2	—	1–0	2–0
Triay–Sainz	0–2	0–1	—	—
Delfina–Majo	—	0–2	—	—

== Draws ==
=== Men's Bracket ===
Round of 32
1	(Argentina) Maxi / (Argentina) Sanyo
Bye
(Brazil) F. Gomes / (Argentina) G. Tamame	2	0
(Spain) Coki / (Spain) J. Rico	6	6
(Argentina) A. Allemandi / (Argentina) A. Silingo	7	4	6
(Argentina) F. Quiles / (Spain) J.G. Diestro	6	6	1
(Spain) G. Rubio / (Spain) E. Moreno	3	5
(Spain) J. Ruiz / (Spain) U. Botello	6	7
(Argentina) F.Stupaczuk / (Spain) M. Díaz	6	6
(Argentina) A. Patiniotis / (Spain) J. Muñoz	4	3
(Argentina) F. Poggi / (Argentina) M. Grabiel	2	6
(Spain) J. Rico / (Spain) V. Ruiz	6	7
(Spain) J.C. Belluati / (Spain) P. Lijó	7	6
(Spain) A. Ruiz / (Spain) M. Piñeiro	6	3
Bye
4	(Spain) Galán / (Spain) J. Mieres
3	(Spain) Lebrón / (Spain) Paquito
Bye
(Spain) J.M. Díaz / (Argentina) Tapia	6	3	6
(Argentina) F. Chingotto / (Argentina) J. Tello	3	6	7
(Spain) Á. Cepero / (Argentina) S. Nerone	6	3	6
(Spain) N. Gadea / (Spain) R. Méndez	3	6	3
Q	(Spain) A. Santana / (Argentina) Godo Díaz	5	6
(Argentina) C. Gutiérrez / (Argentina) R. Moyano	7	7
(Argentina) L. Capra / (Argentina) M. Lamperti	6	6
Q	(Argentina) M. Marina / (Spain) Momo	4	3
Q	(Spain) A. Luque / (Portugal) D. Rocha	3	3
(Uruguay) D. Ramos / (Argentina) J. Restivo	6	6
(Brazil) L. Bergamini / (Brazil) L. Campagnolo	6	6
Q	(Argentina) Di Nenno / (Spain) J. Garrido	1	3
Bye
2	(Argentina) Belasteguín / (Brazil) Lima

Round of 16
1	(Argentina) Maxi / (Argentina) Sanyo	6	7
(Spain) Coki / (Spain) J. Rico	4	5
(Argentina) A. Allemandi / (Argentina) A. Silingo	7	3	6
(Spain) J. Ruiz / (Spain) U. Botello	6	6	3
(Argentina) F.Stupaczuk / (Spain) M. Díaz	6	6
(Spain) J. Rico / (Spain) V. Ruiz	3	3
(Spain) J.C. Belluati / (Spain) P. Lijó	3	5
4	(Spain) Galán / (Spain) J. Mieres	6	7
3	(Spain) Lebrón / (Spain) Paquito	6	6
(Argentina) F. Chingotto / (Argentina) J. Tello	3	2
(Spain) Á. Cepero / (Argentina) S. Nerone	4	1
(Argentina) C. Gutiérrez / (Argentina) R. Moyano	6	6
(Argentina) L. Capra / (Argentina) M. Lamperti	6	6
Q	(Uruguay) D. Ramos / (Argentina) J. Restivo	3	1
(Brazil) L. Bergamini / (Brazil) L. Campagnolo	7	2	1
2	(Argentina) Belasteguín / (Brazil) Lima	6	6	6

Quarter-Final
1	(Argentina) Maxi / (Argentina) Sanyo	6	6
(Argentina) A. Allemandi / (Argentina) A. Silingo	3	2
(Argentina) F.Stupaczuk / (Spain) M. Díaz	6	6
4	(Spain) Galán / (Spain) J. Mieres	4	3
3	(Spain) Lebrón / (Spain) Paquito	4	6	5
(Argentina) C. Gutiérrez / (Argentina) R. Moyano	6	0	1
(Argentina) L. Capra / (Argentina) M. Lamperti	3	4
2	(Argentina) Belasteguín / (Brazil) Lima	6	6

Semi-Finals
1	(Argentina) Maxi / (Argentina) Sanyo	6	7
(Argentina) F.Stupaczuk / (Spain) M. Díaz	3	6
3	(Spain) Lebrón / (Spain) Paquito	6	3	7
2	(Argentina) Belasteguín / (Brazil) Lima	4	6	6

Finals
1	(Argentina) Maxi / (Argentina) Sanyo	6	6
3	(Spain) Lebrón / (Spain) Paquito	3	4

=== Women's Bracket ===
Round of 32
1	(Spain) M. Marrero / (Spain) M. Ortega
Bye
(Spain) C. Goenaga / (Spain) N. Rodríguez	6	2	6
(Portugal) A.C. Nogueira / (Spain) P. Josemaría	4	6	3
(Spain) C. Mesa / (Spain) L. Martínez	6	6
(Spain) A.F. de Ossó / (Spain) S. Pujals	1	0
(Spain) S. Hernández / (Spain) T. Icardo	4	4
(Spain) B. González / (Argentina) C. Tenorio	6	6
(Spain) E. Amatriain / (Spain) P. Llaguno	3	6	6
(Spain) I. Domínguez / (Spain) V. Alonso	6	0	1
(Spain) M. Villalba / (Spain) T. Navarro	6	4
(Portugal) S. Araújo / (Argentina) V. Riera	7	6
Q	(Argentina) Celeste Paz / (Spain) X. Clasca	5	6	6
Q	(Spain) A. Tapia / (Spain) J. Castelló	7	3	3
Bye
4	(Argentina) D. Brea / (Spain) Majo
3	(Spain) Gemma / (Spain) L. Sainz
Bye
Q	(Spain) E. Carnicero / (Spain) M. Merino	2	2
(Spain) A. Blanco / (Spain) B. Caldera	6	6
(France) A. Collombon / (Spain) N. Traviesa	6	6
(Spain) A. Martinez / (Spain) M. Talavan	4	2
(Argentina) A. Osoro / (Argentina) N. Brito	6	4	4
(Spain) C. Navarro / (Argentina) C. Reiter	4	6	6
(Spain) A. Galán / (Spain) V. Iglesias	6	6
(Spain) E. Ramírez / (Spain) M. Truchado	0	2
(Spain) C. Perez / (Spain) L. Torres	6	2
(Spain) A. Cantin / (Spain) S. Ruiz	7	6
(Spain) L. Alonso / (Spain) V. Virseda	3	1
Q	(Spain) N. Rovira / (Brazil) R. Piltcher	6	6
Bye
2	(Spain) Ariana / (Spain) Salazar

Round of 16
1	(Spain) M. Marrero / (Spain) M. Ortega	6	6
(Spain) C. Goenaga / (Spain) N. Rodríguez	0	0
(Spain) C. Mesa / (Spain) L. Martínez	3	3
(Spain) B. González / (Argentina) C. Tenorio	6	6
(Spain) E. Amatriain / (Spain) P. Llaguno	6	6
(Portugal) S. Araújo / (Argentina) V. Riera	4	3
Q	(Argentina) Celeste Paz / (Spain) X. Clasca	2	1
4	(Argentina) D. Brea / (Spain) Majo	6	6
3	(Spain) Gemma / (Spain) L. Sainz	6	6
(Spain) A. Blanco / (Spain) B. Caldera	2	0
(France) A. Collombon / (Spain) N. Traviesa	3	1
(Spain) C. Navarro / (Argentina) C. Reiter	6	6
(Spain) A. Galán / (Spain) V. Iglesias	6	4	6
(Spain) A. Cantin / (Spain) S. Ruiz	4	6	2
Q	(Spain) N. Rovira / (Brazil) R. Piltcher	2	1
2	(Spain) Ariana / (Spain) Salazar	6	6

Quarter-Final
1	(Spain) M. Marrero / (Spain) M. Ortega	6	6
(Spain) B. González / (Argentina) C. Tenorio	3	1
(Spain) E. Amatriain / (Spain) P. Llaguno	6	5	6
4	(Argentina) D. Brea / (Spain) Majo	3	7	2
3	(Spain) Gemma / (Spain) L. Sainz	6	6
(Spain) C. Navarro / (Argentina) C. Reiter	1	4
(Spain) A. Galán / (Spain) V. Iglesias	6	6
2	(Spain) Ariana / (Spain) Salazar	1	3

Semi-Finals
1	(Spain) M. Marrero / (Spain) M. Ortega	1	6	7
(Spain) E. Amatriain / (Spain) P. Llaguno	6	3	6
3	(Spain) Gemma / (Spain) L. Sainz	*
(Spain) A. Galán / (Spain) V. Iglesias

Finals
1	(Spain) M. Marrero / (Spain) M. Ortega	6	6
3	(Spain) Gemma / (Spain) L. Sainz	3	4

== Results ==
=== Round of 32 ===
Men's
Date	Winners	Score	Opponent	Ref.
8/5/2019	(Spain) Coki Nieto (Spain) Javi Rico	6–2 / 6–0	(Brazil) Francisco Chico Gomes (Argentina) Germán Tamame	
8/5/2019	(Argentina) Agustin Goméz Silingo (Argentina) Adrián Allemandi	7–6 / 4–6 / 6–1	(Argentina) Federico Quiles (Spain) José García Diestro	
8/5/2019	(Spain) Javi Ruiz (Spain) Uri Botello	6–3 / 7–5	(Spain) Gonzalo Rubio (Spain) Ernesto Moreno	
8/5/2019	(Argentina) Franco Stupaczuk (Spain) Matías Díaz	6–4 / 6–3	(Argentina) Aris Patiniotis (Spain) Jordi Muñoz	
8/5/2019	(Spain) José Rico (Spain) Víctor Ruiz	6–2 / 7–6	(Argentina) Fernando Poggi (Argentina) Maxi Grabiel	
8/5/2019	(Argentina) Juan Cruz Belluati (Spain) Pablo Lijó	7–6 / 6–3	(Spain) Alejandro Ruiz (Spain) Martin Sánchez Piñeiro	
8/5/2019	(Argentina) Federico Chingotto (Argentina) Juan Tello	3–6 / 6–3 / 7–6	(Argentina) Agustín Tapia (Spain) Juan Martín Díaz	
8/5/2019	(Spain) Álvaro Cepero (Argentina) Sebastián Nerone	6–3 / 3–6 / 6–3	(Spain) Nacho Gadea (Spain) Rafael Méndez	
8/5/2019	(Argentina) Cristian Gutiérrez (Argentina) Ramiro Moyano	7–5 / 7–6	(Spain) Aday Santana (Argentina) Godo Díaz	
8/5/2019	(Argentina) Lucho Capra (Argentina) Miguel Lamperti	6–4 / 6–3	(Argentina) Matías Marina (Spain) Momo González	
8/5/2019	(Uruguay) Diego Ramos (Argentina) Juan Manuel Restivo	6–3 / 6–3	(Spain) Antonio Luque (Portugal) Diogo Rocha	
8/5/2019	(Brazil) Lucas Bergamini (Brazil) Lucas Campagnolo	6–1 / 6–3	(Spain) Javi Garrido (Argentina) Martín Di Nenno	

Women's
Date	Winners	Score	Opponent	Ref.
8/5/2019	(Spain) Carmen Goenaga (Spain) Nuria Rodríguez	6–4 / 2–6 / 6–3	(Portugal) Ana Catarina Nogueira (Spain) Paula Josemaría	
8/5/2019	(Spain) Carla Mesa (Spain) Lucía Martínez	6–1 / 6–0	(Spain) Ana Fernández de Ossó (Spain) Sara Pujals	
8/5/2019	(Spain) Beatriz González (Argentina) Catalina Tenorio	6–4 / 6–4	(Spain) Sandra Hernández (Spain) Tamara Icardo	
8/5/2019	(Spain) Elisabeth Amatriain (Spain) Patricia Llaguno	3–6 / 6–0 / 6–1	(Spain) Isabel Domínguez (Spain) Vanesa Alonso	
8/5/2019	(Portugal) Sofia Araújo (Argentina) Virginia Riera	7–6 / 6–4	(Spain) Maria Villalba (Spain) Teresa Navarro	
8/5/2019	(Argentina) Celeste Paz (Spain) Xenia Clasca	5–7 / 6–3 / 6–3	(Spain) Anna Cortiles Tapia (Spain) Jessica Castelló	
8/5/2019	(Spain) Alicia Blanco Rojo (Spain) Beatriz Caldera	6–2 / 6–2	(Spain) Esther Carnicero (Spain) Melania Merino	
8/5/2019	(France) Alix Collombon (Spain) Nicole Traviesa Mola	6–4 / 6–2	(Spain) Araceli Martinez (Spain) Marta Talavan	
8/5/2019	(Spain) Carolina Navarro (Argentina) Cecilia Reiter	4–6 / 6–4 / 6–4	(Argentina) Aranzazu Osoro (Argentina) Nela Brito	
8/5/2019	(Spain) Alba Galán (Spain) Victoria Iglesias	6–0 / 6–2	(Spain) Elena Ramírez (Spain) Meli García Truchado	
8/5/2019	(Spain) Angela Caro Cantin (Spain) Sara Ruiz	7–6 / 6–2	(Spain) Cynthia Perez (Spain) Laia Bonilla Torres	
8/5/2019	(Spain) Nuria Rovira (Brazil) Raquel Piltcher	6–3 / 6–1	(Spain) Lorena Alonso (Spain) Verónica Virseda	

=== Round of 16 ===
Men's
Date	Winners	Score	Opponent	Ref.
9/5/2019	(Argentina) Maxi Sánchez (Argentina) Sanyo Gutiérrez	6–4 / 7–5	(Spain) Coki Nieto (Spain) Javi Rico	
9/5/2019	(Argentina) Agustin Goméz Silingo (Argentina) Adrián Allemandi	7–6 / 3–6 / 6–3	(Spain) Javi Ruiz (Spain) Uri Botello	
9/5/2019	(Argentina) Franco Stupaczuk (Spain) Matías Díaz	6–3 / 6–3	(Spain) José Rico (Spain) Víctor Ruiz	
9/5/2019	(Spain) Alejandro Galán (Spain) Juani Mieres	6–3 / 7–5	(Argentina) Juan Cruz Belluati (Spain) Pablo Lijó	
9/5/2019	(Spain) Juan Lebrón (Spain) Paquito Navarro	6–3 / 6–2	(Argentina) Federico Chingotto (Argentina) Juan Tello	
9/5/2019	(Argentina) Cristian Gutiérrez (Argentina) Ramiro Moyano	6–4 / 6–1	(Spain) Álvaro Cepero (Argentina) Sebastián Nerone	
9/5/2019	(Argentina) Lucho Capra (Argentina) Miguel Lamperti	6–3 / 6–1	(Uruguay) Diego Ramos (Argentina) Juan Manuel Restivo	
9/5/2019	(Argentina) Fernando Belasteguín (Brazil) Pablo Lima	6–7 / 6–2 / 6–1	(Brazil) Lucas Bergamini (Brazil) Lucas Campagnolo	

Women's
Date	Winners	Score	Opponent	Ref.
9/5/2019	(Spain) Marta Marrero (Spain) Marta Ortega	6–0 / 6–0	(Spain) Carmen Goenaga (Spain) Nuria Rodríguez	
9/5/2019	(Spain) Beatriz González (Argentina) Catalina Tenorio	6–3 / 6–3	(Spain) Carla Mesa (Spain) Lucía Martínez	
9/5/2019	(Spain) Elisabeth Amatriain (Spain) Patricia Llaguno	6–4 / 6–3	(Portugal) Sofia Araújo (Argentina) Virginia Riera	
9/5/2019	(Argentina) Delfina Brea (Spain) Majo Sánchez	6–2 / 6–1	(Argentina) Celeste Paz (Spain) Xenia Clasca	
9/5/2019	(Spain) Gemma Triay (Spain) Lucía Sainz	6–2 / 6–0	(Spain) Alicia Blanco Rojo (Spain) Beatriz Caldera	
9/5/2019	(Spain) Carolina Navarro (Argentina) Cecilia Reiter	6–3 / 6–1	(France) Alix Collombon (Spain) Nicole Traviesa Mola	
9/5/2019	(Spain) Alba Galán (Spain) Victoria Iglesias	6–4 / 4–6 / 6–2	(Spain) Angela Caro Cantin (Spain) Sara Ruiz	
9/5/2019	(Spain) Alejandra Salazar (Spain) Ariana Sánchez	6–2 / 6–1	(Spain) Nuria Rovira (Brazil) Raquel Piltcher	

=== Quarter-Finals ===
Men's
Date	Winners	Score	Opponent	Ref.
10/5/2019	(Argentina) Maxi Sánchez (Argentina) Sanyo Gutiérrez	6–3 / 6–2	(Argentina) Agustin Goméz Silingo (Argentina) Adrián Allemandi	
10/5/2019	(Argentina) Franco Stupaczuk (Spain) Matías Díaz	6–4 / 6–3	(Spain) Alejandro Galán (Spain) Juani Mieres	
10/5/2019	(Spain) Juan Lebrón (Spain) Paquito Navarro	4–6 / 6–0 / 5–1 / W.O.	(Argentina) Cristian Gutiérrez (Argentina) Ramiro Moyano	
10/5/2019	(Argentina) Fernando Belasteguín (Brazil) Pablo Lima	6–3 / 6–4	(Argentina) Lucho Capra (Argentina) Miguel Lamperti	

Women's
Date	Winners	Score	Opponent	Ref.
10/5/2019	(Spain) Marta Marrero (Spain) Marta Ortega	6–3 / 6–1	(Spain) Beatriz González (Argentina) Catalina Tenorio	
10/5/2019	(Spain) Elisabeth Amatriain (Spain) Patricia Llaguno	6–3 / 5–7 / 6–2	(Argentina) Delfina Brea (Spain) Majo Sánchez	
10/5/2019	(Spain) Gemma Triay (Spain) Lucía Sainz	6–1 / 6–4	(Spain) Carolina Navarro (Argentina) Cecilia Reiter	
10/5/2019	(Spain) Alba Galán (Spain) Victoria Iglesias	6–1 / 6–3	(Spain) Alejandra Salazar (Spain) Ariana Sánchez	

=== Semi-Finals ===
Men's
Date	Winners	Score	Opponent	Ref.
11/5/2019	(Argentina) Maxi Sánchez (Argentina) Sanyo Gutiérrez	6–3 / 7–6	(Argentina) Franco Stupaczuk (Spain) Matías Díaz	
11/5/2019	(Spain) Juan Lebrón (Spain) Paquito Navarro	6–4 / 3–6 / 7–6	(Argentina) Fernando Belasteguín (Brazil) Pablo Lima	

Women's
Date	Winners	Score	Opponent	Ref.
11/5/2019	(Spain) Marta Marrero (Spain) Marta Ortega	1–6 / 6–3 / 7–6	(Spain) Elisabeth Amatriain (Spain) Patricia Llaguno	
11/5/2019	(Spain) Gemma Triay (Spain) Lucía Sainz	W.O.	(Spain) Alba Galán (Spain) Victoria Iglesias	

=== Finals ===
Men's
Date	Winners	Score	Opponent	Ref.
12/5/2019	(Argentina) Maxi Sánchez (Argentina) Sanyo Gutiérrez	6–3 / 6–4	(Spain) Juan Lebrón (Spain) Paquito Navarro	

Women's
Date	Winners	Score	Opponent	Ref.
12/5/2019	(Spain) Marta Marrero (Spain) Marta Ortega	6–3 / 6–4	(Spain) Gemma Triay (Spain) Lucía Sainz	
