= 2021 WPT Sardegna Open =

World Padel Tour tournament held in Sardegna, Italy

- Date: 6 – 11 September
- Edition: 2nd
- Category: Open
- Location: Sardinia, Italy
- Venue: Tennis Club Cagliari

Champions
- Men's doubles: (Spain) Alejandro Ruíz (Argentina) Franco Stupaczuk
- Women's doubles: (Spain) Alejandra Salazar (Spain) Gemma Triay

Chronology

The 2021 Sardegna Open (officially 2021 World Padel Tour Sardegna Open) was the eleventh tournament of the ninth season organized by World Padel Tour, the most prestigious padel circuit at the time, and the second tournament organized by a main padel circuit on Italian soil.

In the women's category, the top two ranked pairs both reached the final for the third time. The first finalists were the world number ones, Alejandra Salazar and Gemma Triay, who defeated Aranzazu Osoro and Victoria Iglesias in the semi-finals. Their opponents were the second-ranked pair, Ariana Sánchez and Paula Josemaria, who reached the final after eliminating the twins Mapi and Majo Sánchez. In the decisive match, Gemma and Salazar defeated Ariana and Paula in three sets, securing their fourth title of the season. With this victory, Gemma successfully defended the title she won the previous year, while Salazar claimed her first title in Italy.

In the men's category, the fifth and sixth-ranked pairs reached the finals. The first finalists were Martín Di Nenno and Paquito Navarro who, after eliminating the world number ones, Alejandro Galán and Juan Lebrón, in the quarter-finals, went on to defeat Javier Rico and Momo González in the semi-finals. Their opponents were Alejandro Ruiz and Franco Stupaczuk, who reached the final by defeating the third-ranked pair, Agustín Tapia and Pablo Lima. In the decisive match, Ruiz and Stupaczuk defeated Di Nenno and Paquito in straight sets, securing their first title as a pair. With this victory, Ruiz claimed the first title of his career, while Stupaczuk secured his first title on Italian soil.

The defeat of Belasteguín and Sanyo Gutiérrez in the round of 16 would mark the first time in the 22-year professional career of Fernando Belasteguín that he had been defeated in the opening match of two consecutive tournaments.

== Head-to-head record between teams ranked in the top 4 during the season ==
=== Men's ===
Record	Galán–Lebrón	Belasteguín–Sanyo	Lima–Tapia	Chingotto–Tello	Former Pairs	Di Nenno–Paquito
Galán–Lebrón	—	0–1	1–1	2–1		3–2
Belasteguín–Sanyo	1–0	—	1–1	1–0		1–1
Lima–Tapia	1–1	1–1	—	1–0		1–1
Chingotto–Tello	1–2	0–1	0–1	—		3–1
Former Pairs
Di Nenno–Paquito	2–3	1–1	1–1	1–3		—

=== Women's ===
Record	Gemma–Salazar	Ariana–Josemaria	Bea–Lucia	Llaguno–Riera	Former Pairs	Marrero–Ortega
Gemma–Salazar	—	3–1	1–1	2–1		1–2
Ariana–Josemaria	1–3	—	4–0	2–1		3–0
Bea–Lucia	1–1	0–4	—	2–3		—
Llaguno–Riera	1–2	1–2	3–2	—		—
Former Pairs
Marrero–Ortega	2–1	0–3	—	—		—

== Draws ==
=== Men's Bracket ===
Round of 32
1	(Spain) Galán / (Spain) Lebrón
Bye
Q	(Argentina) C.G. Gutiérrez / (Spain) M. Benítez	4	4
LL	(Spain) E. Alonso / (Spain) J. Moya	6	6
(Argentina) A. Allemandi / (Spain) Coki	6	5	5
Q	(Argentina) A. Gutiérrez / (Chile) J. Valdes	2	7	7
(Spain) F. Gil Morales / (Spain) S. Alba	1	1
5	(Argentina) Di Nenno / (Spain) Paquito	6	6
8	(Spain) J. Rico / (Spain) Momo	6	7	6
(Spain) J.M. Díaz / (Spain) P. Lijó	7	6	3
(Spain) J. Rico / (Spain) V. Ruiz	6	2	6
(Spain) J.G. Diestro / (Spain) P. Fernández	2	6	2
(Spain) J. Serrano / (Spain) M. Díaz	2	4
(Argentina) R. Moyano / (Spain) U. Botello	6	6
Bye
4	(Argentina) Chingotto / (Argentina) J. Tello
3	(Brazil) Lima / (Argentina) Tapia
Bye
(Argentina) A. Silingo / (Spain) J. Sanz	3	0
(Brazil) L. Bergamini / (Brazil) L. Campagnolo	6	6
(Spain) G. Rubio / (Spain) I. Ramírez	6	6
Q	(Spain) A. Luque / (Spain) M. Del Castillo	4	2
(Spain) A. Blanco / (Spain) J. Martinez	2	1
7	(Argentina) L. Capra / (Argentina) Maxi	6	6
6	(Spain) A. Ruiz / (Argentina) Stupaczuk	6	6
WC	(Italy) D. Cattaneo / (Italy) M. Bruno	0	2
WC	(Argentina) M. Capitani / (Italy) S. Cremona	3	3
(Spain) J. Garrido / (Argentina) J.C. Belluati	6	6
(Argentina) M. Lamperti / (Spain) M. Yanguas	7	6
(Spain) A. Sans / (Spain) I. Zaratiegui	6	2
Bye
2	(Argentina) Belasteguín / (Argentina) Sanyo

Round of 16
1	(Spain) Galán / (Spain) Lebrón	7	6
LL	(Spain) E. Alonso / (Spain) J. Moya	5	3
Q	(Argentina) A. Gutiérrez / (Chile) J. Valdes	2	5
5	(Argentina) Di Nenno / (Spain) Paquito	6	7
8	(Spain) J. Rico / (Spain) Momo	6	6
(Spain) J. Rico / (Spain) V. Ruiz	2	4
(Argentina) R. Moyano / (Spain) U. Botello
4	(Argentina) Chingotto / (Argentina) J. Tello	*
3	(Brazil) Lima / (Argentina) Tapia	7	4	7
(Brazil) L. Bergamini / (Brazil) L. Campagnolo	6	6	6
(Spain) G. Rubio / (Spain) I. Ramírez	6	2	6
7	(Argentina) L. Capra / (Argentina) Maxi	4	6	2
6	(Spain) A. Ruiz / (Argentina) Stupaczuk	6	3	7
(Spain) J. Garrido / (Argentina) J.C. Belluati	3	6	6
(Argentina) M. Lamperti / (Spain) M. Yanguas	3	7	7
2	(Argentina) Belasteguín / (Argentina) Sanyo	6	6	6

Quarter-Final
1	(Spain) Galán / (Spain) Lebrón	4	4
5	(Argentina) Di Nenno / (Spain) Paquito	6	6
8	(Spain) J. Rico / (Spain) Momo	6	7
4	(Argentina) Chingotto / (Argentina) J. Tello	3	5
3	(Brazil) Lima / (Argentina) Tapia	6	6
(Spain) G. Rubio / (Spain) I. Ramírez	2	2
6	(Spain) A. Ruiz / (Argentina) Stupaczuk	6	6	6
(Argentina) M. Lamperti / (Spain) M. Yanguas	2	7	4

Semi-Finals
5	(Argentina) Di Nenno / (Spain) Paquito	7	7
8	(Spain) J. Rico / (Spain) Momo	5	5
3	(Brazil) Lima / (Argentina) Tapia	6	3	5
6	(Spain) A. Ruiz / (Argentina) Stupaczuk	4	6	7

Finals
5	(Argentina) Di Nenno / (Spain) Paquito	2	6
6	(Spain) A. Ruiz / (Argentina) Stupaczuk	6	7

=== Women's Bracket ===
Round of 32
1	(Spain) Gemma / (Spain) Salazar
Bye
(Spain) L. Martínez / (Spain) V. Virseda	6	6
Q	(Spain) J. Bautista / (Spain) Melania Merino	2	2
Q	(Spain) A. Cortiles / (Spain) X. Clasca	2	7	*
(Argentina) C. Jensen / (Spain) S. Bellver	6	5
Q	(Spain) I. Domínguez / (Spain) L. Alonso	0	0
5	(Spain) M. Marrero / (Spain) M. Ortega	6	6
8	(Argentina) A. Osoro / (Spain) V. Iglesias	6	6
(Spain) B. Caldera / (Spain) C. Goenaga	2	4
(Portugal) A.C. Nogueira / (Portugal) S. Araújo	6	6
(Spain) A. Cantin / (Spain) A. Soriano	2	2
(Spain) C. Mesa / (Spain) M. Villalba	6	6
(Spain) A. Blanco / (Brazil) R. Piltcher	4	4
Bye
3	(Spain) Bea González / (Spain) L. Sainz
4	(Spain) P. Llaguno / (Argentina) V. Riera
Bye
(Argentina) J. Bidahorria / (Spain) N. Vivancos	6	3
(Spain) A. Cañellas / (France) L. Godallier	7	6
WC	(Italy) C. Pappacena / (Italy) G. Marchetti	2	4
(Spain) C. Navarro / (Spain) E. Amatriain	6	6
(Spain) A. Galán / (Spain) B. Las Heras	5	4
7	(Spain) Mapi / (Spain) Majo	7	6
6	(Argentina) D. Brea / (Spain) T. Icardo	4	6	6
(Italy) C. Orsi / (Italy) G. Sussarello	6	2	2
(Spain) L. Rufo / (Spain) M. Talavan	3	1
(France) A. Collombon / (Spain) J. Castelló	6	6
Q	(Spain) M. Guinart / (Spain) N. Rodríguez	4	6
(Argentina) C. Reiter / (Spain) E. Carnicero	6	7
Bye
2	(Spain) Ariana / (Spain) P. Josemaria

Round of 16
1	(Spain) Gemma / (Spain) Salazar	4	6	6
(Spain) L. Martínez / (Spain) V. Virseda	6	0	2
Q	(Spain) A. Cortiles / (Spain) X. Clasca	2	0
5	(Spain) M. Marrero / (Spain) M. Ortega	6	6
8	(Argentina) A. Osoro / (Spain) V. Iglesias	6	6
(Portugal) A.C. Nogueira / (Portugal) S. Araújo	2	2
(Spain) C. Mesa / (Spain) M. Villalba	2	3
3	(Spain) Bea González / (Spain) L. Sainz	6	6
4	(Spain) P. Llaguno / (Argentina) V. Riera	7	6
(Spain) A. Cañellas / (France) L. Godallier	6	3
(Spain) C. Navarro / (Spain) E. Amatriain=	3	7	4
7	(Spain) Mapi / (Spain) Majo	6	5	6
6	(Argentina) D. Brea / (Spain) T. Icardo	6	6
(France) A. Collombon / (Spain) J. Castelló	1	4
(Argentina) C. Reiter / (Spain) E. Carnicero	3	0
2	(Spain) Ariana / (Spain) P. Josemaria	6	6

Quarter-Final
1	(Spain) Gemma / (Spain) Salazar	6	6
5	(Spain) M. Marrero / (Spain) M. Ortega	2	4
8	(Argentina) A. Osoro / (Spain) V. Iglesias	7	6
3	(Spain) Bea González / (Spain) L. Sainz	6	4
4	(Spain) P. Llaguno / (Argentina) V. Riera	6	4	6
7	(Spain) Mapi / (Spain) Majo	1	6	7
6	(Argentina) D. Brea / (Spain) T. Icardo	4	6	5
2	(Spain) Ariana / (Spain) P. Josemaria	6	3	7

Semi-Finals
1	(Spain) Gemma / (Spain) Salazar	6	6
8	(Argentina) A. Osoro / (Spain) V. Iglesias	2	2
7	(Spain) Mapi / (Spain) Majo	3	3
2	(Spain) Ariana / (Spain) P. Josemaria	6	6

Finals
1	(Spain) Gemma / (Spain) Salazar	6	6	6
2	(Spain) Ariana / (Spain) P. Josemaria	7	3	1

== Results ==
=== Round of 32 ===
Men's
Date	Winners	Score	Opponent	Ref.
7/9/2021	(Spain) Eduardo Alonso (Spain) Jesús Moya	6–4 / 6–4	(Argentina) Cristian Germán Gutiérrez (Spain) Miguel Benítez	
7/9/2021	(Argentina) Agustin Gutiérrez (Chile) Javier Valdes	2–6 / 7–5 / 7–5	(Argentina) Adrián Allemandi (Spain) Coki Nieto	
7/9/2021	(Argentina) Martin Di Nenno (Spain) Paquito Navarro	6–1 / 6–1	(Spain) Francisco Gil Morales (Spain) Sergio Alba	
7/9/2021	(Spain) Javier Rico (Spain) Momo González	6–7 / 7–6 / 6–3	(Spain) Juan Martín Díaz (Spain) Pablo Lijó	
7/9/2021	(Spain) José Rico (Spain) Victor Ruiz	6–2 / 2–6 / 6–2	(Spain) José García Diestro (Spain) Pincho Fernández	
7/9/2021	(Argentina) Ramiro Moyano (Spain) Uri Botello	6–2 / 6–4	(Spain) Jose Sánchez Serrano (Spain) Matías Díaz	
7/9/2021	(Brazil) Lucas Bergamini (Brazil) Lucas Campagnolo	6–3 / 6–0	(Argentina) Agustin Gómez Silingo (Spain) Jon Sanz	
7/9/2021	(Spain) Gonzalo Rubio (Spain) Iván Ramírez	6–4 / 6–2	(Spain) Antonio Luque (Spain) Mario Del Castillo	
7/9/2021	(Argentina) Lucho Capra (Argentina) Maxi Sánchez	6–2 / 6–1	(Spain) Adrian Blanco (Spain) Javier Martinez Vazquez	
7/9/2021	(Spain) Alejandro Ruiz (Argentina) Franco Stupaczuk	6–0 / 6–2	(Italy) Daniele Cattaneo (Italy) Michele Bruno	
7/9/2021	(Spain) Javi Garrido (Argentina) Juan Cruz Belluati	6–3 / 6–3	(Argentina) Marcelo Capitani (Italy) Simone Cremona	
7/9/2021	(Argentina) Miguel Lamperti (Spain) Miguel Yanguas	7–6 / 6–2	(Spain) Anton Sans (Spain) Iñigo Zaratiegui	

Women's
Date	Winners	Score	Opponent	Ref.
7/9/2021	(Spain) Lucía Martínez (Spain) Verónica Virseda	6–2 / 6–2	(Spain) Julia Polo Bautista (Spain) Melania Merino	
7/9/2021	(Spain) Anna Cortiles (Spain) Xenia Clasca	2–6 / 7–5 / W.O.	(Argentina) Claudia Jensen (Spain) Sandra Bellver	
7/9/2021	(Spain) Marta Marrero (Spain) Marta Ortega	6–0 / 6–0	(Spain) Isabel Domínguez (Spain) Lorena Alonso	
7/9/2021	(Argentina) Aranzazu Osoro (Spain) Victoria Iglesias	6–2 / 6–4	(Spain) Beatriz Caldera (Spain) Carmen Goenaga	
7/9/2021	(Portugal) Ana Catarina Nogueira (Portugal) Sofia Araújo	6–2 / 6–2	(Spain) Angela Caro Cantin (Spain) Arantxa Soriano	
7/9/2021	(Spain) Carla Mesa (Spain) Maria Villalba	6–4 / 6–4	(Spain) Alicia Blanco Rojo (Brazil) Raquel Piltcher	
7/9/2021	(Spain) Ariadna Cañellas (France) Lea Godallier	7–6 / 6–3	(Argentina) Julieta Bidahorria (Spain) Nuria Vivancos	
7/9/2021	(Spain) Carolina Navarro (Argentina) Cecilia Reiter	6–2 / 6–4	(Italy) Chiara Pappacena (Italy) Giorgia Marchetti	
7/9/2021	(Spain) Mapi Sánchez (Spain) Majo Sánchez	7–5 / 6–4	(Spain) Alba Galán (Spain) Barbara Las Heras	
7/9/2021	(Argentina) Delfina Brea (Spain) Tamara Icardo	4–6 / 6–2 / 6–2	(Italy) Carolina Orsi (Italy) Giulia Sussarello	
7/9/2021	(France) Alix Collombon (Spain) Jessica Castelló	6–3 / 6–1	(Spain) Lorena Rufo (Spain) Marta Talavan	
7/9/2021	(Argentina) Cecilia Reiter (Spain) Esther Carnicero	6–4 / 7–6	(Spain) Marina Guinart (Spain) Nuria Rodríguez	

=== Round of 16 ===
Men's
Date	Winners	Score	Opponent	Ref.
8/9/2021	(Spain) Alejandro Galán (Spain) Juan Lebrón	7–5 / 6–3	(Spain) Eduardo Alonso (Spain) Jesús Moya	
8/9/2021	(Argentina) Martin Di Nenno (Spain) Paquito Navarro	6–2 / 7–5	(Argentina) Agustin Gutiérrez (Chile) Javier Valdes	
8/9/2021	(Spain) Javier Rico (Spain) Momo González	6–2 / 6–4	(Spain) José Rico (Spain) Victor Ruiz	
8/9/2021	(Argentina) Federico Chingotto (Argentina) Juan Tello	W.O.	(Argentina) Ramiro Moyano (Spain) Uri Botello	
8/9/2021	(Argentina) Agustín Tapia (Brazil) Pablo Lima	7–6 / 4–6 / 7–6	(Brazil) Lucas Bergamini (Brazil) Lucas Campagnolo	
8/9/2021	(Spain) Gonzalo Rubio (Spain) Iván Ramírez	6–4 / 2–6 / 6–2	(Argentina) Lucho Capra (Argentina) Maxi Sánchez	
8/9/2021	(Spain) Alejandro Ruiz (Argentina) Franco Stupaczuk	6–3 / 3–6 / 7–6	(Spain) Javi Garrido (Argentina) Juan Cruz Belluati	
8/9/2021	(Argentina) Miguel Lamperti (Spain) Miguel Yanguas	3–6 / 7–6 / 7–6	(Argentina) Fernando Belasteguín (Argentina) Sanyo Gutiérrez	

Women's
Date	Winners	Score	Opponent	Ref.
8/9/2021	(Spain) Alejandra Salazar (Spain) Gemma Triay	4–6 / 6–0 / 6–2	(Spain) Lucía Martínez (Spain) Verónica Virseda	
8/9/2021	(Spain) Marta Marrero (Spain) Marta Ortega	6–2 / 6–0	(Spain) Anna Cortiles (Spain) Xenia Clasca	
8/9/2021	(Argentina) Aranzazu Osoro (Spain) Victoria Iglesias	6–2 / 6–2	(Portugal) Ana Catarina Nogueira (Portugal) Sofia Araújo	
8/9/2021	(Spain) Bea González (Spain) Lucía Sainz	6–2 / 6–3	(Spain) Carla Mesa (Spain) Maria Villalba	
8/9/2021	(Spain) Patricia Llaguno (Argentina) Virginia Riera	7–6 / 6–3	(Spain) Ariadna Cañellas (France) Lea Godallier	
8/9/2021	(Spain) Mapi Sánchez (Spain) Majo Sánchez	6–3 / 5–7 / 6–4	(Spain) Carolina Navarro (Argentina) Cecilia Reiter	
8/9/2021	(Argentina) Delfina Brea (Spain) Tamara Icardo	6–1 / 6–4	(France) Alix Collombon (Spain) Jessica Castelló	
8/9/2021	(Spain) Ariana Sánchez (Spain) Paula Josemaria	6–3 / 6–0	(Argentina) Cecilia Reiter (Spain) Esther Carnicero	

=== Quarter-Finals ===
Men's
Date	Winners	Score	Opponent	Ref.
9/9/2021	(Argentina) Martin Di Nenno (Spain) Paquito Navarro	6–4 / 6–4	(Spain) Alejandro Galán (Spain) Juan Lebrón	
9/9/2021	(Spain) Javier Rico (Spain) Momo González	6–3 / 7–5	(Argentina) Federico Chingotto (Argentina) Juan Tello	
9/9/2021	(Argentina) Agustín Tapia (Brazil) Pablo Lima	6–2 / 6–2	(Spain) Gonzalo Rubio (Spain) Iván Ramírez	
9/9/2021	(Spain) Alejandro Ruiz (Argentina) Franco Stupaczuk	6–2 / 6–7 / 6–4	(Argentina) Miguel Lamperti (Spain) Miguel Yanguas	

Women's
Date	Winners	Score	Opponent	Ref.
9/9/2021	(Spain) Alejandra Salazar (Spain) Gemma Triay	6–2 / 6–4	(Spain) Marta Marrero (Spain) Marta Ortega	
9/9/2021	(Argentina) Aranzazu Osoro (Spain) Victoria Iglesias	7–6 / 6–4	(Spain) Bea González (Spain) Lucía Sainz	
9/9/2021	(Spain) Mapi Sánchez (Spain) Majo Sánchez	1–6 / 6–4 / 7–6	(Spain) Patricia Llaguno (Argentina) Virginia Riera	
9/9/2021	(Spain) Ariana Sánchez (Spain) Paula Josemaria	6–4 / 3–6 / 7–5	(Argentina) Delfina Brea (Spain) Tamara Icardo	

=== Semi-Finals ===
Men's
Date	Winners	Score	Opponent	Ref.
10/9/2021	(Argentina) Martin Di Nenno (Spain) Paquito Navarro	7–5 / 7–5	(Spain) Javier Rico (Spain) Momo González	
10/9/2021	(Spain) Alejandro Ruiz (Argentina) Franco Stupaczuk	4–6 / 6–3 / 7–5	(Argentina) Agustín Tapia (Brazil) Pablo Lima	

Women's
Date	Winners	Score	Opponent	Ref.
10/9/2021	(Spain) Alejandra Salazar (Spain) Gemma Triay	6–2 / 6–2	(Argentina) Aranzazu Osoro (Spain) Victoria Iglesias	
10/9/2021	(Spain) Ariana Sánchez (Spain) Paula Josemaria	6–3 / 6–3	(Spain) Mapi Sánchez (Spain) Majo Sánchez	

=== Finals ===
Men's
Date	Winners	Score	Opponent	Ref.
11/9/2021	(Spain) Alejandro Ruíz (Argentina) Franco Stupaczuk	6–2 / 7–6	(Argentina) Martín Di Nenno (Spain) Paquito Navarro	

Women's
Date	Winners	Score	Opponent	Ref.
11/9/2021	(Spain) Alejandra Salazar (Spain) Gemma Triay	6–7 / 6–3 / 6–1	(Spain) Ariana Sánchez (Spain) Paula Josemaría	
