= 2019 WPT Córdoba Open =

World Padel Tour tournament held in Córdoba, Spain

- Date: 12 – 17 November
- Edition: 9th (Note: The first six editions were held under the organization of the Padel Pro Tour.)
- Category: Open
- Location: Córdoba, Spain
- Venue: Polideportivo La Albericia

Champions
- Men's doubles: (Argentina) Franco Stupaczuk (Spain) Matías Díaz
- Women's doubles: (Spain) Marta Marrero (Spain) Marta Ortega

Chronology

The 2019 Córdoba Open (officially 2019 World Padel Tour Cervezas Victoria Córdoba Open) was the fifteenth tournament of the seventh season organized by World Padel Tour, the most prestigious padel circuit at the time.

In the women's category, on their way to their second final of the season, Elisabeth Amatriaín and Patricia Llaguno ended the race for the number 1 ranking by eliminating the number 2 pair, Alejandra Salazar and Ariana Sánchez, in the quarter-finals. The other finalists would be Marta Marrero and Marta Ortega, who with the elimination of their rivals mathematically guaranteed finishing the season as number 1 in the ranking even before playing the final. In the final, Marrero and Ortega, who were playing in their ninth final of the season, defeated Amatriaín and Llaguno without difficulty, winning their seventh title of the year and their first in Córdoba.

In the men's category, similarly to the women's, also occurred events that affected the race for the number 1 spot in the world ranking, with the current number ones, Maxi Sánchez and Sanyo Gutiérrez, being eliminated in the quarterfinals. This gave the world number two pair, Juan Lebrón and Paquito Navarro, who reached a final after a five-month absence, the chance to give Lebrón the sole lead at the top of the ranking if they won the tournament. Their rivals in the final were Franco Stupaczuk and Matías Díaz, who were reaching their second final of the year, seeking revenge for the Swedish Open where they had lost in the championship match to Lebrón and Paquito. In the title match, Díaz and Stupaczuk defeated Lebrón and Paquito in straight sets, preventing Lebrón from ascending to first place and winning the pair's first title of the year and their first in Córdoba.

== Head-to-head record between teams ranked in the top 4 during the season ==
=== Men's ===
Record	Maxi–Sanyo	Lebrón–Paquito	Galán–Lima	Belasteguín–Tapia	Former Pairs	Díaz–Stupaczuk	Belasteguín–Lima	Galán–J. Mieres	Lamperti–Mieres
Maxi–Sanyo	—	3–1	—	1–1		3–0	—	1–1	—
Lebrón–Paquito	1–3	—	0–2	1–2		2–3	5–0	2–0	—
Galán–Lima	—	2–0	—	1–0		0–1	—	—	—
Belasteguín–Tapia	1–1	2–1	0–1	—		1–0	—	—	—
Former Pairs
Díaz–Stupaczuk	0–3	3–2	1–0	0–1		—	0–1	2–0	—
Belasteguín–Lima	—	0–5	—	—		1–0	—	0–1	—
Galán–J. Mieres	1–1	0–2	—	—		0–2	1–0	—	—
Lamperti–Mieres	—	—	—	—		—	—	—	—

=== Women's ===
Record	Marrero–Ortega	Ariana–Salazar	Majo–Mapi	Josemaria–Nogueira	Former Pairs	Amatriain–Llaguno	Triay–Sainz	Delfina–Majo
Marrero–Ortega	—	4–2	0–1	5–1		5–2	4–0	2–0
Ariana–Salazar	2–4	—	1–1	3–2		3–1	4–0	4–0
Majo–Mapi	1–0	1–1	—	—		1–2	0–1	—
Josemaria–Nogueira	1–5	2–3	—	—		1–2	3–1	1–0
Former Pairs
Amatriain–Llaguno	2–5	1–3	2–1	2–1		—	1–0	2–3
Triay–Sainz	0–4	0–4	1–0	1–3		0–1	—	—
Delfina–Majo	0–2	0–4	—	0–1		3–2	—	—

== Draws ==
=== Men's Bracket ===
Round of 32
1	(Argentina) Maxi / (Argentina) Sanyo
Bye
(Spain) G. Rubio / (Spain) E. Moreno	6	6
(Spain) J. Mieres / (Brazil) M. Jardim	4	2
(Spain) A. Blanco / (Spain) J. Martinez	7	3	3
Q	(Spain) R. Rivera / (Spain) T. Bueno	6	6	6
Q	(Spain) J. Gutiérrez / (Spain) J.G. Diestro	1	4
8	(Argentina) A. Allemandi / (Argentina) A. Silingo	6	6
7	(Argentina) F. Stupaczuk / (Spain) M. Díaz	2	6	6
(Spain) Coki / (Spain) J. Rico	6	1	2
(Spain) A. Ruiz / (Spain) M. Piñeiro	0	6
(Argentina) Di Nenno / (Spain) J. Garrido	6	7
(Spain) J. Barahona / (Spain) J. Gutiérrez	6	6	1
Q	(Argentina) D. Perino / (Argentina) F. Poggi	7	4	6
Bye
3	(Spain) Galán / (Brazil) Lima
4	(Argentina) Belasteguín / (Argentina) Tapia
Bye
Q	(Argentina) Godo Díaz / (Argentina) M. Marina	6	2
(Brazil) L. Campagnolo / (Argentina) L. Capra	7	6
(Argentina) C. Gutiérrez / (Argentina) F. Quiles	6	6
(Spain) J. Rico / (Spain) V. Ruiz	0	2
(Argentina) J.C. Belluati / (Argentina) R. Moyano	6	3
5	(Spain) J. Ruiz / (Spain) U. Botello	7	6
6	(Argentina) F. Chingotto / (Argentina) J. Tello	6	7
(Spain) N. Gadea / (Argentina) S. Nerone	4	6
(Spain) Á. Cepero / (Spain) P. Lijó	6	7
(Argentina) M. Grabiel / (Argentina) M. Lamperti	3	5
(Spain) A. Santana / (Brazil) L. Bergamini	6	7
(Uruguay) D. Ramos / (Spain) R. Méndez	1	6
Bye
2	(Spain) Lebrón / (Spain) Paquito

Round of 16
1	(Argentina) Maxi / (Argentina) Sanyo	6	6
(Spain) G. Rubio / (Spain) E. Moreno	2	2
Q	(Spain) R. Rivera / (Spain) T. Bueno	7	4	3
8	(Argentina) A. Allemandi / (Argentina) A. Silingo	6	6	6
7	(Argentina) F. Stupaczuk / (Spain) M. Díaz	4	6	7
(Argentina) Di Nenno / (Spain) J. Garrido	6	2	5
Q	(Argentina) D. Perino / (Argentina) F. Poggi	3	2
3	(Spain) Galán / (Brazil) Lima	6	6
4	(Argentina) Belasteguín / (Argentina) Tapia	6	6
(Brazil) L. Campagnolo / (Argentina) L. Capra	3	2
(Argentina) C. Gutiérrez / (Argentina) F. Quiles	2	1
5	(Spain) J. Ruiz / (Spain) U. Botello	6	6
6	(Argentina) F. Chingotto / (Argentina) J. Tello	4	6	6
(Spain) Á. Cepero / (Spain) P. Lijó	6	4	2
(Spain) A. Santana / (Brazil) L. Bergamini	1	4
2	(Spain) Lebrón / (Spain) Paquito	6	6

Quarter-Final
1	(Argentina) Maxi / (Argentina) Sanyo	4	2
8	(Argentina) A. Allemandi / (Argentina) A. Silingo	6	6
7	(Argentina) F. Stupaczuk / (Spain) M. Díaz	3	6	6
3	(Spain) Galán / (Brazil) Lima	6	3	3
4	(Argentina) Belasteguín / (Argentina) Tapia	7	7
5	(Spain) J. Ruiz / (Spain) U. Botello	5	6
6	(Argentina) F. Chingotto / (Argentina) J. Tello	3	2
2	(Spain) Lebrón / (Spain) Paquito	6	6

Semi-Finals
8	(Argentina) A. Allemandi / (Argentina) A. Silingo	2	4
7	(Argentina) F. Stupaczuk / (Spain) M. Díaz	6	6
4	(Argentina) Belasteguín / (Argentina) Tapia	2	4
2	(Spain) Lebrón / (Spain) Paquito	6	6

Finals
7	(Argentina) F. Stupaczuk / (Spain) M. Díaz	6	6
2	(Spain) Lebrón / (Spain) Paquito	3	3

=== Women's Bracket ===
Round of 32
1	(Spain) M. Marrero / (Spain) M. Ortega
Bye
(Spain) E. Carnicero / (Spain) M. Merino	2	6
(France) A. Collombon / (Spain) N. Traviesa	6	7
(Spain) L. Martínez / (Spain) T. Navarro	6	6
Q	(Spain) A. Soriano / (Spain) M. Borrero	2	2
(Spain) C. Goenaga / (Spain) N. Rodríguez	3	3
5	(Spain) Gemma / (Spain) L. Sainz	6	6
8	(Spain) C. Navarro / (Argentina) C. Reiter	7	5	6
(Spain) A. Tapia / (Spain) J. Castelló	6	7	2
(Spain) A. Blanco / (Spain) B. Caldera	1	6
(Spain) M. Villalba / (Spain) V. Virseda	6	7
(Spain) A. Martinez / (Argentina) C. Tenorio	6	6
(Spain) E. Ramírez / (Spain) M. Talavan	4	1
Bye
4	(Portugal) A.C. Nogueira / (Spain) P. Josemaría
3	(Spain) Majo / (Spain) Mapi
Bye
Q	(Argentina) C. Paz / (Spain) S. Ruiz	3	3
(Spain) A. Cantin / (Spain) N. Rovira	6	6
(Spain) A.F. de Ossó / (Spain) C. Mesa	7	6
(Spain) C. García / (France) L. Godallier	5	2
(Argentina) A. Osoro / (Argentina) N. Brito	4	7	2
7	(Spain) B. González / (Argentina) D. Brea	6	6	6
6	(Spain) E. Amatriain / (Spain) P. Llaguno	6	6
(Portugal) S. Araújo / (Argentina) V. Riera	4	3
LL	(Spain) E. Frances / (Uruguay) M. Drosdov	4	4
(Spain) A. Galán / (Spain) V. Iglesias	6	6
(Spain) L. Alonso / (Spain) S. Pujals	4	3
Q	(Spain) A. Izquierdo / (Spain) M. Pinacho	6	6
Bye
2	(Spain) Ariana / (Spain) Salazar

Round of 16
1	(Spain) M. Marrero / (Spain) M. Ortega	6	7
(France) A. Collombon / (Spain) N. Traviesa	3	6
(Spain) L. Martínez / (Spain) T. Navarro	2	1
5	(Spain) Gemma / (Spain) L. Sainz	6	6
8	(Spain) C. Navarro / (Argentina) C. Reiter	6	3	2
(Spain) M. Villalba / (Spain) V. Virseda	1	6	6
(Spain) A. Martinez / (Argentina) C. Tenorio	4	4
4	(Portugal) A.C. Nogueira / (Spain) P. Josemaría	6	6
3	(Spain) Majo / (Spain) Mapi	6	6
(Spain) A. Cantin / (Spain) N. Rovira	4	1
(Spain) A.F. de Ossó / (Spain) C. Mesa	3	4
7	(Spain) B. González / (Argentina) D. Brea	6	6
6	(Spain) E. Amatriain / (Spain) P. Llaguno	6	6
(Spain) A. Galán / (Spain) V. Iglesias	0	3
Q	(Spain) A. Izquierdo / (Spain) M. Pinacho	1	2
2	(Spain) Ariana / (Spain) Salazar	6	6

Quarter-Final
1	(Spain) M. Marrero / (Spain) M. Ortega	7	6
5	(Spain) Gemma / (Spain) L. Sainz	6	2
(Spain) M. Villalba / (Spain) V. Virseda	5	7	2
4	(Portugal) A.C. Nogueira / (Spain) P. Josemaría	7	6	6
3	(Spain) Majo / (Spain) Mapi	7	6
7	(Spain) B. González / (Argentina) D. Brea	5	3
6	(Spain) E. Amatriain / (Spain) P. Llaguno	7	6
2	(Spain) Ariana / (Spain) Salazar	6	4

Semi-Finals
1	(Spain) M. Marrero / (Spain) M. Ortega	7	6
4	(Portugal) A.C. Nogueira / (Spain) P. Josemaría	5	2
3	(Spain) Majo / (Spain) Mapi	3	4
6	(Spain) E. Amatriain / (Spain) P. Llaguno	6	6

Finals
1	(Spain) M. Marrero / (Spain) M. Ortega	6	6
6	(Spain) E. Amatriain / (Spain) P. Llaguno	2	0

== Results ==
=== Round of 32 ===
Men's
Date	Winners	Score	Opponent	Ref.
13/11/2019	(Spain) Gonzalo Rubio (Spain) Ernesto Moreno	6–4 / 6–2	(Spain) Juani Mieres (Brazil) Marcello Jardim	
13/11/2019	(Spain) Rubén Rivera (Spain) Toni Bueno	6–7 / 6–3 / 6–3	(Spain) Adrián Blanco (Spain) Javier Martinez Vazquez	
13/11/2019	(Argentina) Agustin Goméz Silingo (Argentina) Adrián Allemandi	6–1 / 6–4	(Spain) José García Diestro (Spain) Jorge Ruiz Gutiérrez	
13/11/2019	(Argentina) Franco Stupaczuk (Spain) Matías Díaz	2–6 / 6–1 / 6–2	(Spain) Coki Nieto (Spain) Javi Rico	
13/11/2019	(Spain) Javi Garrido (Argentina) Martín Di Nenno	6–0 / 7–6	(Spain) Alejandro Ruiz (Spain) Martin Sánchez Piñeiro	
13/11/2019	(Argentina) Denis Perino (Argentina) Fernando Poggi	7–6 / 4–6 / 6–1	(Spain) Javier Barahona (Spain) Momo González	
13/11/2019	(Brazil) Lucas Campagnolo (Argentina) Lucho Capra	7–6 / 6–2	(Argentina) Godo Díaz (Spain) Matías Marina Artusa	
13/11/2019	(Argentina) Cristian Gutiérrez (Argentina) Federico Quiles	6–0 / 6–2	(Spain) José Rico (Spain) Víctor Ruiz	
13/11/2019	(Spain) Javi Ruiz (Spain) Uri Botello	7–6 / 6–3	(Argentina) Juan Cruz Belluati (Argentina) Ramiro Moyano	
13/11/2019	(Argentina) Federico Chingotto (Argentina) Juan Tello	6–4 / 7–6	(Spain) Nacho Gadea (Argentina) Sebastián Nerone	
13/11/2019	(Spain) Álvaro Cepero (Spain) Pablo Lijó	6–3 / 7–5	(Argentina) Maxi Grabiel (Argentina) Miguel Lamperti	
13/11/2019	(Spain) Aday Santana (Brazil) Lucas Bergamini	6–1 / 7–6	(Uruguay) Diego Ramos (Spain) Rafael Méndez	

Women's
Date	Winners	Score	Opponent	Ref.
13/11/2019	(France) Alix Collombon (Spain) Nicole Traviesa Mola	6–2 / 7–6	(Spain) Esther Carnicero (Spain) Melania Merino	
13/11/2019	(Spain) Lucía Martínez (Spain) Teresa Navarro	6–2 / 6–2	(Spain) Arantxa Soriano (Spain) Marta Borrero	
13/11/2019	(Spain) Gemma Triay (Spain) Lucia Sainz	6–3 / 6–3	(Spain) Carmen Goenaga (Spain) Nuria Rodríguez	
13/11/2019	(Spain) Carolina Navarro (Argentina) Cecilia Reiter	7–6 / 5–7 / 6–2	(Spain) Anna Cortiles Tapia (Spain) Jessica Castelló	
13/11/2019	(Spain) Maria Villalba (Spain) Verónica Virseda	6–1 / 7–5	(Spain) Alicia Blanco Rojo (Spain) Beatriz Caldera	
13/11/2019	(Spain) Araceli Martinez (Argentina) Catalina Tenorio	6–4 / 6–1	(Spain) Elena Ramírez (Spain) Marta Talavan	
13/11/2019	(Spain) Angela Caro Cantin (Spain) Nuria Rovira	6–3 / 6–3	(Argentina) Celeste Paz (Spain) Sara Ruiz	
13/11/2019	(Spain) Ana Fernández de Ossó (Spain) Carla Mesa	7–5 / 6–2	(Spain) Carmen García Pardo (France) Lea Godallier	
13/11/2019	(Spain) Bea González (Argentina) Delfina Brea	6–4 / 6–7 / 6–2	(Argentina) Aranzazu Osoro (Argentina) Nela Brito	
13/11/2019	(Spain) Elisabeth Amatriain (Spain) Patricia Llaguno	6–4 / 6–3	(Portugal) Sofia Araújo (Argentina) Virginia Riera	
13/11/2019	(Spain) Alba Galán (Spain) Victoria Iglesias	6–4 / 6–4	(Spain) Estela Frances (Uruguay) Manuela Alaga Drosdov	
13/11/2019	(Spain) Alba Izquierdo (Spain) María Pinacho Sánchez	6–4 / 6–3	(Spain) Lorena Alonso (Spain) Sara Pujals	

=== Round of 16 ===
Men's
Date	Winners	Score	Opponent	Ref.
14/11/2019	(Argentina) Maxi Sánchez (Argentina) Sanyo Gutiérrez	6–2 / 6–2	(Spain) Gonzalo Rubio (Spain) Ernesto Moreno	
14/11/2019	(Argentina) Agustin Goméz Silingo (Argentina) Adrián Allemandi	6–7 / 6–4 / 6–3	(Spain) Rubén Rivera (Spain) Toni Bueno	
14/11/2019	(Argentina) Franco Stupaczuk (Spain) Matías Díaz	4–6 / 6–2 / 7–5	(Spain) Javi Garrido (Argentina) Martín Di Nenno	
14/11/2019	(Spain) Alejandro Galán (Brazil) Pablo Lima	6–3 / 6–2	(Argentina) Denis Perino (Argentina) Fernando Poggi	
14/11/2019	(Argentina) Agustín Tapia (Argentina) Fernando Belasteguín	6–3 / 6–2	(Brazil) Lucas Campagnolo (Argentina) Lucho Capra	
14/11/2019	(Spain) Javi Ruiz (Spain) Uri Botello	6–2 / 6–1	(Argentina) Cristian Gutiérrez (Argentina) Federico Quiles	
14/11/2019	(Argentina) Federico Chingotto (Argentina) Juan Tello	4–6 / 6–4 / 6–2	(Spain) Álvaro Cepero (Spain) Pablo Lijó	
14/11/2019	(Spain) Juan Lebrón (Spain) Paquito Navarro	6–1 / 6–4	(Spain) Aday Santana (Brazil) Lucas Bergamini	

Women's
Date	Winners	Score	Opponent	Ref.
14/11/2019	(Spain) Marta Marrero (Spain) Marta Ortega	6–3 / 7–6	(France) Alix Collombon (Spain) Nicole Traviesa Mola	
14/11/2019	(Spain) Gemma Triay (Spain) Lucia Sainz	6–2 / 6–1	(Spain) Lucía Martínez (Spain) Teresa Navarro	
14/11/2019	(Spain) Maria Villalba (Spain) Verónica Virseda	1–6 / 6–3 / 6–2	(Spain) Carolina Navarro (Argentina) Cecilia Reiter	
14/11/2019	(Portugal) Ana Catarina Nogueira (Spain) Paula Josemaría	6–4 / 6–4	(Spain) Araceli Martinez (Argentina) Catalina Tenorio	
14/11/2019	(Spain) Majo Sánchez (Spain) Mapi Sánchez	6–4 / 6–1	(Spain) Angela Caro Cantin (Spain) Nuria Rovira	
14/11/2019	(Spain) Bea González (Argentina) Delfina Brea	6–3 / 6–4	(Spain) Ana Fernández de Ossó (Spain) Carla Mesa	
14/11/2019	(Spain) Elisabeth Amatriain (Spain) Patricia Llaguno	6–0 / 6–3	(Spain) Alba Galán (Spain) Victoria Iglesias	
14/11/2019	(Spain) Alejandra Salazar (Spain) Ariana Sánchez	6–1 / 6–2	(Spain) Alba Izquierdo (Spain) María Pinacho Sánchez	

=== Quarter-Finals ===
Men's
Date	Winners	Score	Opponent	Ref.
15/11/2019	(Argentina) Agustin Goméz Silingo (Argentina) Adrián Allemandi	6–4 / 6–2	(Argentina) Maxi Sánchez (Argentina) Sanyo Gutiérrez	
15/11/2019	(Argentina) Franco Stupaczuk (Spain) Matías Díaz	3–6 / 6–3 / 6–3	(Spain) Alejandro Galán (Brazil) Pablo Lima	
15/11/2019	(Argentina) Agustín Tapia (Argentina) Fernando Belasteguín	7–5 / 7–6	(Spain) Javi Ruiz (Spain) Uri Botello	
15/11/2019	(Spain) Juan Lebrón (Spain) Paquito Navarro	6–3 / 6–2	(Argentina) Federico Chingotto (Argentina) Juan Tello	

Women's
Date	Winners	Score	Opponent	Ref.
15/11/2019	(Spain) Marta Marrero (Spain) Marta Ortega	7–6 / 6–2	(Spain) Gemma Triay (Spain) Lucia Sainz	
15/11/2019	(Portugal) Ana Catarina Nogueira (Spain) Paula Josemaría	7–5 / 6–7 / 6–2	(Spain) Maria Villalba (Spain) Verónica Virseda	
15/11/2019	(Spain) Majo Sánchez (Spain) Mapi Sánchez	7–5 / 6–3	(Spain) Bea González (Argentina) Delfina Brea	
15/11/2019	(Spain) Elisabeth Amatriain (Spain) Patricia Llaguno	7–6 / 6–4	(Spain) Alejandra Salazar (Spain) Ariana Sánchez	

=== Semi-Finals ===
Men's
Date	Winners	Score	Opponent	Ref.
16/11/2019	(Argentina) Franco Stupaczuk (Spain) Matías Díaz	6–2 / 6–4	(Argentina) Agustin Goméz Silingo (Argentina) Adrián Allemandi	
16/11/2019	(Spain) Juan Lebrón (Spain) Paquito Navarro	6–2 / 6–4	(Argentina) Agustín Tapia (Argentina) Fernando Belasteguín	

Women's
Date	Winners	Score	Opponent	Ref.
16/11/2019	(Spain) Marta Marrero (Spain) Marta Ortega	7–5 / 6–2	(Portugal) Ana Catarina Nogueira (Spain) Paula Josemaría	
16/11/2019	(Spain) Elisabeth Amatriain (Spain) Patricia Llaguno	6–3 / 6–4	(Spain) Majo Sánchez (Spain) Mapi Sánchez	

=== Finals ===
Men's
Date	Winners	Score	Opponent	Ref.
17/11/2019	(Argentina) Franco Stupaczuk (Spain) Matías Díaz	6–3 / 6–3	(Spain) Juan Lebrón (Spain) Paquito Navarro	

Women's
Date	Winners	Score	Opponent	Ref.
17/11/2019	(Spain) Marta Marrero (Spain) Marta Ortega	6–2 / 6–0	(Spain) Elisabeth Amatriain (Spain) Patricia Llaguno	
