= 2018 WPT Swedish Open =

World Padel Tour tournament held in Båstad, Sweden

- Date: 23 – 29 July
- Edition: 1st
- Category: Open
- Location: Bastad, Sweden
- Venue: Båstad Tennis Stadium

Champions
- Men's doubles: (Argentina) Fernando Belasteguín (Brazil) Pablo Lima

Chronology

The 2018 Swedish Open (officially 2018 World Padel Tour Euro Finans Swedish Padel Open) was the seventh tournament of the sixth season organized by World Padel Tour, the most prestigious padel circuit at the time.

No women's event was held at this tournament, as it was an exclusively men's competition. In the men's category, Juan Martín Díaz and Paquito Navarro, the world's number three pair, reached their third final of the season to face the world number ones, Fernando Belasteguín and Pablo Lima. In the decisive match, Belasteguín and Lima defeated Díaz and Paquito in three sets, claiming their third title of the season and ending the first part of the season with an increased ranking lead over Maxi Sánchez and Sanyo Gutiérrez. With this victory, Belasteguín and Lima also became the first players to win a tournament on Swedish soil.

== Head-to-head record between teams ranked in the top 4 during the season ==
=== Men's ===
Record	Belasteguín–Lima	Maxi–Sanyo	J.M. Díaz–Paquito	Gutiérrez–Stupaczuk
Belasteguín–Lima	—	1–0	2–0	1–0
Maxi–Sanyo	0–1	—	3–0	1–0
J.M. Díaz–Paquito	0–2	0–3	—	—
Gutiérrez–Stupaczuk	0–1	0–1	—	—

== Draws ==
=== Men's Bracket ===
Round of 32
1	(Argentina) Belasteguín / (Brazil) Lima
Bye
(Spain) J. Ruiz / (Spain) U. Botello	6	6
Q	(Argentina) A. Patiniotis / (Spain) J. Muñoz	0	3
(Spain) A. Santana / (Spain) I. Gadea	6	6
(Argentina) J. Restivo / (Spain) P.A. Martínez	1	0
(Sweden) C. Knutsson / (Sweden) D. Windahl	3	2
(Spain) J. Mieres / (Argentina) M. Lamperti	6	6
(Argentina) J.C. Belluati / (Spain) Lebrón	6	6	6
(Spain) A. Cepero / (Argentina) G. Díaz	2	7	3
(France) A. Maigre / (France) R. Haziza	5	2
(Spain) R. García / (Spain) R. Marcos	7	6
(Brazil) L. Bergamini / (Brazil) L. Campagnolo	6	6
(Cameroon) G.C. García / (Spain) P. Valin Fernández	0	0
Bye
4	(Argentina) C. Gutiérrez / (Argentina) Stupaczuk
3	(Spain) J.M. Díaz / (Spain) Paquito
Bye
(Spain) A. Ortiz / (Spain) J. Benavides	2	1
Q	(Spain) G. Rubio / (Spain) E. Moreno	6	6
(Argentina) M. Grabiel / (Spain) P. Lijó
(Argentina) A. Allemandi / (Spain) J. Garrido
(Netherlands) B. Meijer / (Netherlands) U. Maarsen	2	4
(Argentina) L. Capra / (Argentina) R. Moyano	6	6
(Spain) Galán / (Spain) M. Díaz	3	6	6
(Argentina) F. Chingotto / (Argentina) J. Tello	6	3	4
(Argentina) F. Quiles / (Brazil) F. Gomes	6	1	6
(Argentina) A. Silingo / (Spain) A. Ruiz	3	6	3
(Spain) M. Piñeiro / (Spain) W. Lahoz	7	2	0
(Spain) J.G. Diestro / (Argentina) S. Nerone	6	6	6
Bye
2	(Argentina) Maxi / (Argentina) Sanyo

Round of 16
1	(Argentina) Belasteguín / (Brazil) Lima	6	6
(Spain) J. Ruiz / (Spain) U. Botello	3	2
(Spain) A. Santana / (Spain) I. Gadea	7	4	3
(Spain) J. Mieres / (Argentina) M. Lamperti	6	6	6
(Argentina) J.C. Belluati / (Spain) Lebrón	6	6
(Spain) R. García / (Spain) R. Marcos	3	1
(Brazil) L. Bergamini / (Brazil) L. Campagnolo	7	2	4
4	(Argentina) C. Gutiérrez / (Argentina) Stupaczuk	5	6	6
3	(Spain) J.M. Díaz / (Spain) Paquito	7	6
(Spain) G. Rubio / (Spain) E. Moreno	5	1
(Argentina) M. Grabiel / (Spain) P. Lijó	6	6	6
(Argentina) L. Capra / (Argentina) R. Moyano	7	4	2
(Spain) Galán / (Spain) M. Díaz	7	6
(Argentina) F. Quiles / (Brazil) F. Gomes	5	1
(Spain) J.G. Diestro / (Argentina) S. Nerone	4	4
2	(Argentina) Maxi / (Argentina) Sanyo	6	6

Quarter-Final
1	(Argentina) Belasteguín / (Brazil) Lima	6	6
(Spain) J. Mieres / (Argentina) M. Lamperti	3	4
(Argentina) J.C. Belluati / (Spain) Lebrón	3	6	6
4	(Argentina) C. Gutiérrez / (Argentina) Stupaczuk	6	2	3
3	(Spain) J.M. Díaz / (Spain) Paquito	6	6
(Argentina) M. Grabiel / (Spain) P. Lijó	4	4
(Spain) Galán / (Spain) M. Díaz	6	7
2	(Argentina) Maxi / (Argentina) Sanyo	2	6

Semi-Finals
1	(Argentina) Belasteguín / (Brazil) Lima	7	7
(Argentina) J.C. Belluati / (Spain) Lebrón	6	6
3	(Spain) J.M. Díaz / (Spain) Paquito	7	6
(Spain) Galán / (Spain) M. Díaz	6	4

Finals
1	(Argentina) Belasteguín / (Brazil) Lima	6	3	6
3	(Spain) J.M. Díaz / (Spain) Paquito	2	6	3

== Results ==
=== Round of 32 ===
Men's

Date	Winners	Score	Opponent	Refs.
25/7/2018	(Spain) Javi Ruiz (Spain) Uri Botello	6–0 / 6–3	(Argentina) Aris Patiniotis (Spain) Jordi Muñoz	
25/7/2018	(Spain) Aday Santana (Spain) Nacho Gadea	6–1 / 6–0	(Argentina) Juan Manuel Restivo (Spain) Pedro Alonso Martínez	
25/7/2018	(Spain) Juani Mieres (Argentina) Miguel Lamperti	6–3 / 6–2	(Sweden) Carl Knutsson (Sweden) Daniel Windahl	
25/7/2018	(Argentina) Juan Cruz Belluati (Spain) Juan Lebrón	6–2 / 6–7 / 6–3	(Spain) Álvaro Cepero (Argentina) Godo Díaz	
25/7/2018	(Spain) Raúl Díaz García (Spain) Raúl Marcos Durán	7–5 / 6–2	(France) Adrien Maigret (France) Robin Haziza	
25/7/2018	(Brazil) Lucas Bergamini (Brazil) Lucas Campagnolo	6–0 / 6–0	(Cameroon) Guillaume Castro García (Spain) Pablo Valin Fernández	
25/7/2018	(Spain) Gonzalo Rubio (Spain) Ernesto Moreno	6–2 / 6–1	(Spain) Alvaro Vargas Ortiz (Spain) José María Benavides	
25/7/2018	(Argentina) Maxi Grabiel (Spain) Pablo Lijó	6–1 / 6–4	(Argentina) Adrián Allemandi (Spain) Javi Garrido	
25/7/2018	(Argentina) Lucho Capra (Argentina) Ramiro Moyano	6–2 / 6–4	(Netherlands) Bram Meijer (Netherlands) Uriel Maarsen	
25/7/2018	(Spain) Alejandro Galán (Spain) Matías Díaz	3–6 / 6–3 / 6–4	(Argentina) Federico Chingotto (Argentina) Juan Tello	
25/7/2018	(Argentina) Federico Quiles (Brazil) Francisco Gomes	6–3 / 1–6 / 6–3	(Argentina) Agustin Gomez Silingo (Spain) Alejandro Ruiz	
25/7/2018	(Spain) José García Diestro (Argentina) Sebastián Nerone	6–7 / 6–2 / 6–0	(Spain) Martin Sanchez Piñeiro (Spain) Willy Lahoz	

=== Round of 16 ===
Men's

Date	Winners	Score	Opponent	Refs.
26/7/2018	(Argentina) Fernando Belasteguín (Brazil) Pablo Lima	6–3 / 6–2	(Spain) Javi Ruiz (Spain) Uri Botello	
26/7/2018	(Spain) Juani Mieres (Argentina) Miguel Lamperti	6–7 / 6–4 / 6–3	(Spain) Aday Santana (Spain) Nacho Gadea	
26/7/2018	(Argentina) Juan Cruz Belluati (Spain) Juan Lebrón	6–3 / 6–1	(Spain) Raúl Díaz García (Spain) Raúl Marcos Durán	
26/7/2018	(Argentina) Cristian Gutiérrez (Argentina) Franco Stupaczuk	5–7 / 6–2 / 6–4	(Brazil) Lucas Bergamini (Brazil) Lucas Campagnolo	
26/7/2018	(Spain) Juan Martin Díaz (Spain) Paquito Navarro	7–5 / 6–1	(Spain) Gonzalo Rubio (Spain) Ernesto Moreno	
26/7/2018	(Argentina) Maxi Grabiel (Spain) Pablo Lijó	6–7 / 6–4 / 6–2	(Argentina) Lucho Capra (Argentina) Ramiro Moyano	
26/7/2018	(Spain) Alejandro Galán (Spain) Matías Díaz	7–5 / 6–1	(Argentina) Federico Quiles (Brazil) Francisco Gomes	
26/7/2018	(Argentina) Maxi Sánchez (Argentina) Sanyo Gutiérrez	6–4 / 6–4	(Spain) José García Diestro (Argentina) Sebastián Nerone	

=== Quarter-Finals ===
Men's

Date	Winners	Score	Opponent	Refs.
27/7/2018	(Argentina) Fernando Belasteguín (Brazil) Pablo Lima	6–3 / 6–4	(Spain) Juani Mieres (Argentina) Miguel Lamperti	
27/7/2018	(Argentina) Juan Cruz Belluati (Spain) Juan Lebrón	3–6 / 6–2 / 6–3	(Argentina) Cristian Gutiérrez (Argentina) Franco Stupaczuk	
27/7/2018	(Spain) Juan Martin Díaz (Spain) Paquito Navarro	6–4 / 6–4	(Argentina) Maxi Grabiel (Spain) Pablo Lijó	
27/7/2018	(Spain) Alejandro Galán (Spain) Matías Díaz	6–2 / 7–6	(Argentina) Maxi Sánchez (Argentina) Sanyo Gutiérrez	

=== Semi-Finals ===
Men's

Date	Winners	Score	Opponent	Refs.
28/7/2018	(Argentina) Fernando Belasteguín (Brazil) Pablo Lima	7–6 / 7–6	(Argentina) Juan Cruz Belluati (Spain) Juan Lebrón	
28/7/2018	(Spain) Juan Martin Díaz (Spain) Paquito Navarro	7–6 / 6–4	(Spain) Alejandro Galán (Spain) Matías Díaz	

=== Finals ===
Men's

Date	Winners	Score	Opponent	Refs.
29/7/2018	(Argentina) Fernando Belasteguín (Brazil) Pablo Lima	6–2 / 3–6 / 6–3	(Spain) Juan Martin Díaz (Spain) Paquito Navarro	
