= Jim López =

Argentine football manager (1912–1979)

Personal information
- Full name: Alejandro Galán
- Date of birth: 6 July 1912
- Place of birth: Buenos Aires, Argentina
- Date of death: 21 April 1979 (aged 66)
- Place of death: São Paulo, Brazil

Managerial career
- Years: Team
- 1937: Estudante Paulista
- 1939: Hespanha
- 1939: Ypiranga-SP
- 1946: Ypiranga-SP
- 1947–1948: Portuguesa
- 1950: Palmeiras
- 1952: Juventus-SP
- 1952–1953: Portuguesa
- 1953–1954: São Paulo
- 1955: Ponte Preta
- 1958: Ponte Preta
- 1958–1959: Independiente
- 1960: River Plate
- 1960: Corinthians
- 1962–1963: Rosario Central
- 1962: Argentina
- 1963–1964: Gimnasia La Plata
- 1965: São Paulo
- 1966: Portuguesa
- 1967: Argentina
- 1967: Los Andes
- 1968–1969: Colón
- 1969: Vélez Sarsfield
- 1970: Newell's Old Boys
- 1973–1974: Olhanense
- 1976: Juventus-SP

Alejandro Galán (6 July 1912 – 21 April 1979), better known as Jim López, was an Argentine football manager.

== Career ==
Born in the region of Parque Patricios, Buenos Aires, Galán youth sport was boxing. Trying to obtain good results, he moved to Brazil, where the sport was still less developed compared to Argentine boxing. However, it came up against a ban on the sport that occurred during the Getúlio Vargas era. Studying physical education in São Paulo, he then chose to start a career as a manager, starting with Estudante Paulista in 1937. With a conservative playing style and a good result rate, he moved up to bigger clubs, until reaching Portuguesa de Desportos in 1947, a club for which he would have spent most of his career, and Palmeiras in 1950, where he won his first title, the Taça Cidade de São Paulo. Again at Portuguesa, López become champion of the 1952 Rio-São Paulo Tournament, and the following year, he was champion of the 1953 Campeonato Paulista with São Paulo FC, with other great Argentine players such as Gustavo Albella and Juan José Negri, who was brought to the Brazil by López.

In 1958, he returned to Argentina at Independiente, achieving third place in the league in his second year of work. He managed River Plate and Corinthians in sequence with discreet results, until in 1962 he equaled Rosario Central's best campaign in history, with a sixth place. This performance gave him the position of coach of the Argentine national team for the Carlos Dittborn Cup against Chile. In 1967, López was again chosen to manage Argentina, this time in the 1967 South American Championship. He would still carry out other jobs, ending his career as a coach in 1976, at CA Juventus.

== Honours ==
Palmeiras

- Taça Cidade de São Paulo: 1950

Portuguesa

- Torneio Rio-São Paulo: 1952

São Paulo

- Campeonato Paulista: 1953

Argentina

- Copa Carlos Dittborn: 1962
