= 2023 Finland Open =

Padel championships

- Date: 28 August – 3 September
- Edition: 1st
- Category: Open 1000
- Location: Tampere, Finland
- Venue: Padelone Arena

Champions
- Men's doubles: (Spain) Alejandro Galán (Spain) Juan Lebrón
- Women's doubles: (Spain) Bea González (Argentina) Delfina Brea

Chronology
Previous
Mendoza P1 (PP)
Next
Paris Major (PP)

The WPT 2023 Finland Open (officially WPT 2023 Aare Invest Finland Padel Open) was the fifteenth tournament of the eleventh edition of World Padel Tour. The tournament was played between 28th August and 3rd September of 2023 at Padelone Arena, Finland.

In the women's category, the third and fourth ranked pairs met in the finals, with the number four team Bea González and Delfina Brea claimed their ninth title of the season, after defeating Alejandra Salazar and Sofia Araújo in the finals.

In the men's category, former number ranked Alejandro Galán and Juan Lebrón won their first title of the season, after defeating the eight ranked duo, Coki Nieto and Jon Sanz.

== Schedule ==
The final draw was played:

- Thursday 30 August: Round of 32.
- Thursday 31 August: Round of 16.
- Friday 1 September: Quarterfinals.
- Saturday 2 September: Semifinals.
- Sunday 3 September: Finals.

== Results ==
=== Men's Bracket ===
Round of 32
1	(Spain) Coello / (Argentina) Tapia	6	6
(Spain) A. Arroyo / (Spain) G. Rubio	4	2
(Spain) R. Méndez / (Spain) T. Bueno	3	0
(Brazil) L. Bergamini / (Spain) V. Ruiz	6	4	*
(Spain) E. Alonso / (Spain) J. Esbri	7	4	6
(Spain) J. Bautista / (Spain) J. Muñoz	5	6	3
(Spain) F. Gil / (Spain) S. Sánchez	6	3	3
6	(Spain) A. Ruiz / (Argentina) J. Tello	4	6	6
5	(Spain) Momo / (Argentina) Sanyo	3	6	7
(Spain) I. Vilariño / (Spain) S. Oria	6	4	5
(Spain) I. Ramírez / (Spain) P.G. Rodrigo	6	6
(Argentina) L. Augsburger / (Argentina) V. Libaak	2	2
(Argentina) D. Perino / (Argentina) M. Lamperti	6	7	3
(Spain) J. Ruiz / (Argentina) J.C. Belluati	7	5	6
(Argentina) A. Gutiérrez / (Spain) J. Rico	6	4	1
3	(Spain) Galán / (Spain) Lebrón	4	6	6
4	(Argentina) Chingotto / (Spain) Paquito	6	3	6
(Spain) J. Garrido / (Spain) J. Rico	4	6	2
(Spain) A. Ayats / (Spain) F. Guerrero	3	6	2
(Spain) J.G. Mora / (Spain) J.G. Barahona	6	2	5
(Spain) P. Cardona / (Spain) P. Fernandez	6	6
(Finland) S. Huttunen / (Finland) P. Hyrkkönen	4	2
(Spain) M. del Castillo / (Spain) M. Benítez	3	3
7	(Argentina) F. Belasteguín / (Spain) Yanguas	6	6
8	(Spain) Coki / (Spain) J. Sanz	7	7
(Spain) J. Leal / (Spain) J.G. Diestro	5	5
(Argentina) N. Suescun / (Spain) V. Mena	7	4	7
(Argentina) A. Chozas / (Spain) A. Cepero	6	6	6
(Argentina) L. Capra / (Argentina) Maxi	6	4	6
(Spain) J.J. Casas / (Spain) L.H. Quesada	3	6	2
(Finland) M. Sjövall / (Argentina) J.P. Andrada	1	6
LL	(Argentina) A. Patiniotis / (Spain) E. Chamero	6	7

Round of 16
1	(Spain) Coello / (Argentina) Tapia	4	4
(Brazil) L. Bergamini / (Spain) V. Ruiz	6	6
(Spain) E. Alonso / (Spain) J. Esbri	2	3
6	(Spain) A. Ruiz / (Argentina) J. Tello	6	6
5	(Spain) Momo / (Argentina) Sanyo	7	7
(Spain) I. Ramírez / (Spain) P.G. Rodrigo	6	6
(Spain) J. Ruiz / (Argentina) J.C. Belluati	7	6	1
3	(Spain) Galán / (Spain) Lebrón	5	7	6
4	(Argentina) Chingotto / (Spain) Paquito	6	6
(Spain) J.G. Mora / (Spain) J.G. Barahona	0	3
(Spain) P. Cardona / (Spain) P. Fernandez	1	3
7	(Argentina) F. Belasteguín / (Spain) Yanguas	6	6
8	(Spain) Coki / (Spain) J. Sanz	6	7
(Argentina) N. Suescun / (Spain) V. Mena	3	5
(Argentina) L. Capra / (Argentina) Maxi	6	7
(Argentina) A. Patiniotis / (Spain) E. Chamero	2	5

Quarter-Final
(Brazil) L. Bergamini / (Spain) V. Ruiz	6	2	3
6	(Spain) A. Ruiz / (Argentina) J. Tello	3	6	6
5	(Spain) Momo / (Argentina) Sanyo	6	3	4
3	(Spain) Galán / (Spain) Lebrón	1	6	6
4	(Argentina) Chingotto / (Spain) Paquito	4	6
7	(Argentina) F. Belasteguín / (Spain) Yanguas	6	7
8	(Spain) Coki / (Spain) J. Sanz	6	7
(Argentina) L. Capra / (Argentina) Maxi	3	5

Semi-Finals
6	(Spain) A. Ruiz / (Argentina) J. Tello	4	6	3
3	(Spain) Galán / (Spain) Lebrón	6	3	6
7	(Argentina) F.Belasteguín / (Spain) Yanguas	5	6	3
8	(Spain) Coki / (Spain) J. Sanz	7	4	6

Finals
3	(Spain) Galán / (Spain) Lebrón	6	7
8	(Spain) Coki / (Spain) J. Sanz	0	6

=== Women's Bracket ===
Round of 32
1	(Spain) Ariana Sánchez / (Spain) Paula Josemaria
Bye
(Sweden) C. Navarro / (Spain) M. Guinart	0	1
(Argentina) C. Jensen / (Spain) V. Virseda	6	6
(Spain) N. Rodriguez / (Spain) M. Talaván	6	4	6
(Spain) L.R. Abajo / (Spain) M. Fassio	2	6	1
(Finland) E. Sillanpää / (Finland) S. Saarteinen	2	1
5	(Spain) T. Icardo / (Argentina) V. Riera	6	6
6	(Argentina) A. Osoro / (Spain) J. Castelló	4	6	6
(Italy) C. Orsi / (Spain) C. Mesa	6	4	4
(Portugal) A. Nogueira / (Spain) B. Caldera	2	7	6
(France) A. Collombon / (Spain) L. Rufo	6	6	4
(Spain) M. Barrera / (Spain) M. Villalba	6	1	6
(Spain) M. Martínez / (Spain) S. Saiz	3	6	2
Bye
3	(Spain) A. Salazar / (Portugal) S. Araújo
4	(Spain) B. González / (Argentina) D. Brea
Bye
(Spain) M. Caparros / (Spain) T. Navarro	3	4
(Spain) E. Carnicero / (Spain) M. Saez	6	6
(Spain) L. Perez / (Finland) M. Minetti	1	0
(Spain) C. Goenaga / (Spain) L. Martínez	6	6
(Spain) A. Martinez / (Spain) S. Ruiz	7	3	2
8	(Spain) L. Sainz / (Spain) P. Llaguno	6	6	6
7	(Spain) Majo / (Spain) Mapi	6	6
(Spain) A. Soriano / (Spain) S. Bellver	4	0
(Russia) K. Sharifova / (Spain) M. Borrero	2	4
(Spain) C. Fernandez / (Spain) V. Iglesias	6	6
(Spain) E. Amatriaín / (France) L. Godallier	6	7
(Italy) C. Casali / (Spain) R. Segura	1	5
Bye
2	(Spain) Gemma Triay / (Spain) Marta Ortega

Round of 16
1	(Spain) A. Sánchez / (Spain) P. Josemaria
(Argentina) C. Jensen / (Spain) V. Virseda	*
(Spain) N. Rodriguez / (Spain) M. Talaván	2	4
5	(Spain) T. Icardo / (Argentina) V. Riera	6	6
6	(Argentina) A. Osoro / (Spain) J. Castelló	6	7
(Portugal) A. Nogueira / (Spain) B. Caldera	3	5
(Spain) M. Barrera / (Spain) M. Villalba	2	0
3	(Spain) A. Salazar / (Portugal) S. Araújo	6	6
4	(Spain) Bea González / (Argentina) D. Brea	6	6
(Spain) E. Carnicero / (Spain) M. Saez	3	1
(Spain) C. Goenaga / (Spain) L. Martínez	4	6	6
8	(Spain) L. Sainz / (Spain) P. Llaguno	6	2	0
7	(Spain) Majo / (Spain) Mapi	2	6	6
(Spain) C. Fernandez / (Spain) V. Iglesias	6	3	2
(Spain) E. Amatriaín / (France) L. Godallier	2	0
2	(Spain) G. Triay / (Spain) M. Ortega	6	6

Quarter-Final
(Argentina) C. Jensen / (Spain) V. Virseda	5	6	6
5	(Spain) T. Icardo / (Argentina) V. Riera	7	3	1
6	(Argentina) A. Osoro / (Spain) J. Castelló	0	2
3	(Spain) A. Salazar / (Portugal) S. Araújo	6	6
4	(Spain) B. González / (Argentina) D. Brea	6	7
8	(Spain) C. Goenaga / (Spain) L. Martínez	3	6
7	(Spain) Majo / (Spain) Mapi	1	3
2	(Spain) G. Triay / (Spain) M. Ortega	6	6

Semi-Finals
(Argentina) C. Jensen / (Spain) V. Virseda	5	0
3	(Spain) A. Salazar / (Portugal) S. Araújo	7	6
4	(Spain) B. González / (Argentina) D. Brea	6	6
2	(Spain) G. Triay / (Spain) M. Ortega	4	4

Finals
3	(Spain) A. Salazar / (Portugal) S. Araújo	4	1
4	(Spain) B. González / (Argentina) D. Brea	6	6

=== Round of 32 ===
Men's

Date	Winners	Score	Opponent	Refs.
30/8/2023	(Argentina) Agustín Tapia (Spain) Arturo Coello	6–4 / 6–2	(Spain) Alejandro Arroyo (Spain) Gonzalo Rubio	
30/8/2023	(Brazil) Lucas Bergamini (Spain) Víctor Ruiz	6–3 / 4–0 / W.O.	(Spain) Rafael Méndez (Spain) Toni Bueno	
30/8/2023	(Spain) Eduardo Alonso (Spain) Juanlu Esbri	7–5 / 4–6 / 6–3	(Spain) Jairo Bautista (Spain) Jaime Muñoz	
30/8/2023	(Spain) Alex Ruiz (Argentina) Juan Tello	4–6 / 6–3 / 6–3	(Spain) Francisco Gil (Spain) Sergio Sánchez	
30/8/2023	(Spain) Momo González (Argentina) Sanyo Gutiérrez	3–6 / 6–4 / 7–5	(Spain) Ignacio Vilariño (Spain) Salvador Oria	
30/8/2023	(Spain) Iván Ramírez (Spain) Pablo García Rodrigo	6–2 / 6–2	(Argentina) Leo Augsburger (Argentina) Valentino Libaak	
30/8/2023	(Spain) Javi Ruiz (Argentina) Juan Cruz Belluati	7–6 / 5–7 / 6–3	(Argentina) Denis Perino (Argentina) Miguel Lamperti	
30/8/2023	(Spain) Alejandro Galán (Spain) Juan Lebrón	4–6 / 6–4 / 6–1	(Argentina) Agustín Gutiérrez (Spain) Josete Rico	
30/8/2023	(Argentina) Federico Chingotto (Spain) Paquito Navarro	6–4 / 3–6 / 6–2	(Spain) Javi Garrido (Spain) Javi Rico	
30/8/2023	(Spain) J.G. Mora (Spain) J.G. Barahona	6–3 / 2–6 / 5–2 / W.O.	(Spain) Arnau Ayats (Spain) Francisco Guerrero	
30/8/2023	(Spain) Pablo Cardona (Spain) Pincho Fernandez	6–4 / 6–2	(Finland) Saska Huttunen (Finland) Pyry Hyrkkönen	
30/8/2023	(Argentina) Fernando Belasteguín (Spain) Miguel Yanguas	6–3 / 6–3	(Spain) Mario del Castillo (Spain) Miguel Benítez	
30/8/2023	(Spain) Coki Nieto (Spain) Jon Sanz	7–5 / 7–5	(Spain) Javier Leal (Spain) José García Diestro	
30/8/2023	(Argentina) Nicolás Suescun (Spain) Victor Mena	7–6 / 4–6 / 7–6	(Argentina) Alex Chozas (Spain) Alvaro Cepero	
30/8/2023	(Argentina) Lucho Capra (Argentina) Maxi Sánchez	6–3 / 4–6 / 6–2	(Spain) Jose Jimenez Casas (Spain) Luis Hernandez Quesada	
30/8/2023	(Argentina) Aris Patiniotis (Spain) Emilio Sanchez Chamero	6–1 / 7–6	(Finland) Max Sjövall (Argentina) Juan Pablo Andrada	

Women's

Date	Winners	Score	Opponent	Refs.
30/8/2023	(Argentina) Claudia Jensen (Spain) Verónica Virseda	6–0 / 6–1	(Sweden) Carolina Navarro (Spain) Marina Guinart	
30/8/2023	(Spain) Nuria Rodriguez (Spain) Marta Talaván	6–2 / 4–6 / 6–1	(Spain) Laia Rodriguez Abajo (Spain) Martina Fassio	
30/8/2023	(Spain) Tamara Icardo (Argentina) Virginia Riera	6–2 / 6–1	(Finland) Ella Sillanpää (Finland) Saana Saarteinen	
30/8/2023	(Argentina) Aranza Osoro (Spain) Jessica Castelló	4–6 / 6–4 / 6–4	(Italy) Carolina Orsi (Spain) Carla Mesa	
30/8/2023	(Portugal) Ana Catarina Nogueira (Spain) Beatriz Caldera	2–6 / 7–6 / 6–4	(France) Alix Collombon (Spain) Lorena Rufo	
30/8/2023	(Spain) Marta Barrera (Spain) Mari Carmen Villalba	6–3 / 1–6 / 6–2	(Spain) Marina Martínez (Spain) Sofía Saiz	
30/8/2023	(Spain) Esther Carnicero (Spain) Melania Merino Saez	6–3 / 6–4	(Spain) Marta Caparros (Spain) Teresa Navarro	
30/8/2023	(Spain) Carmen Goenaga (Spain) Lucía Martínez	6–1 / 6–0	(Spain) Lucia Perez Parra (Finland) Martina Minetti	
30/8/2023	(Spain) Lucía Sainz (Spain) Patty Llaguno	6–7 / 6–3 / 6–2	(Spain) Araceli Martinez (Spain) Sara Ruiz Soto	
30/8/2023	(Spain) Majo Sánchez Alayeto (Spain) Mapi Sánchez Alayeto	6–4 / 6–0	(Spain) Arantxa Soriano (Spain) Sandra Bellver	
30/8/2023	(Spain) Claudia Fernandez (Spain) Victoria Iglesias	6–2 / 6–4	(Russia) Ksenia Sharifova (Spain) Marta Borrero	
30/8/2023	(Spain) Eli Amatriaín (France) Lea Godallier	6–1 / 7–5	(Italy) Carlotta Casali (Spain) Raquel Segura	

=== Round of 16 ===
Men's

Date	Team A	Score	Team B	Refs.
31/8/2023	(Brazil) Lucas Bergamini (Spain) Víctor Ruiz	6–4 / 6–4	(Argentina) Agustín Tapia (Spain) Arturo Coello	
31/8/2023	(Spain) Alex Ruiz (Argentina) Juan Tello	6–2 / 6–3	(Spain) Eduardo Alonso (Spain) Juanlu Esbri	
31/8/2023	(Spain) Momo González (Argentina) Sanyo Gutiérrez	7–6 / 7–6	(Spain) Iván Ramírez (Spain) Pablo García Rodrigo	
31/8/2023	(Spain) Alejandro Galán (Spain) Juan Lebrón	5–7 / 7–6 / 6–1	(Spain) Javi Ruiz (Argentina) Juan Cruz Belluati	
31/8/2023	(Argentina) Federico Chingotto (Spain) Paquito Navarro	6–0 / 6–3	(Spain) J.G. Mora (Spain) J.G. Barahona	
31/8/2023	(Argentina) Fernando Belasteguín (Spain) Miguel Yanguas	6–1 / 6–3	(Spain) Pablo Cardona (Spain) Pincho Fernandez	
31/8/2023	(Spain) Coki Nieto (Spain) Jon Sanz	6–3 / 7–5	(Argentina) Nicolás Suescun (Spain) Victor Mena	
31/8/2023	(Argentina) Lucho Capra (Argentina) Maxi Sánchez	6–2 / 7–5	(Argentina) Aris Patiniotis (Spain) Emilio Sanchez Chamero	

Women's

Date	Team A	Score	Team B	Refs.
31/8/2023	(Argentina) Claudia Jensen (Spain) Verónica Virseda	W.O.	(Spain) Ariana Sánchez (Spain) Paula Josemaria	
31/8/2023	(Spain) Tamara Icardo (Argentina) Virginia Riera	6–2 / 6–4	(Spain) Nuria Rodriguez (Spain) Marta Talaván	
31/8/2023	(Argentina) Aranza Osoro (Spain) Jessica Castelló	6–3 / 7–5	(Portugal) Ana Catarina Nogueira (Spain) Beatriz Caldera	
31/8/2023	(Spain) Alejandra Salazar (Portugal) Sofia Araújo	6–2 / 6–0	(Spain) Marta Barrera (Spain) Mari Carmen Villalba	
31/8/2023	(Spain) Bea González (Argentina) Delfina Brea	6–3 / 6–1	(Spain) Esther Carnicero (Spain) Melania Merino Saez	
31/8/2023	(Spain) Carmen Goenaga (Spain) Lucía Martínez	4–6 / 6–2 / 6–0	(Spain) Lucía Sainz (Spain) Patty Llaguno	
31/8/2023	(Spain) Majo Sánchez Alayeto (Spain) Mapi Sánchez Alayeto	2–6 / 6–3 / 6–2	(Spain) Claudia Fernandez (Spain) Victoria Iglesias	
31/8/2023	(Spain) Gemma Triay (Spain) Marta Ortega	6–2 / 6–0	(Spain) Eli Amatriaín (France) Lea Godallier	

=== Quarter-Finals ===
Men's

Date	Team A	Score	Team B	Refs.
1/9/2023	(Spain) Alex Ruiz (Argentina) Juan Tello	3–6 / 6–2 / 6–3	(Brazil) Lucas Bergamini (Spain) Víctor Ruiz	
1/9/2023	(Spain) Alejandro Galán (Spain) Juan Lebrón	1–6 / 6–3 / 6–4	(Spain) Momo González (Argentina) Sanyo Gutiérrez	
1/9/2023	(Argentina) Fernando Belasteguín (Spain) Miguel Yanguas	6–4 / 7–6	(Argentina) Federico Chingotto (Spain) Paquito Navarro	
1/9/2023	(Spain) Coki Nieto (Spain) Jon Sanz	6–3 / 7–5	(Argentina) Lucho Capra (Argentina) Maxi Sánchez	

Women's

Date	Team A	Score	Team B	Refs.
1/9/2023	(Argentina) Claudia Jensen (Spain) Verónica Virseda	5–7 / 6–3 / 6–1	(Spain) Tamara Icardo (Argentina) Virginia Riera	
1/9/2023	(Spain) Alejandra Salazar (Portugal) Sofia Araújo	6–0 / 6–2	(Argentina) Aranza Osoro (Spain) Jessica Castelló	
1/9/2023	(Spain) Bea González (Argentina) Delfina Brea	6–3 / 7–6	(Spain) Carmen Goenaga (Spain) Lucía Martínez	
1/9/2023	(Spain) Gemma Triay (Spain) Marta Ortega	6–1 / 6–3	(Spain) Majo Sánchez Alayeto (Spain) Mapi Sánchez Alayeto	

=== Semi-Finals ===
Men's

Date	Team A	Score	Team B	Refs.
2/9/2023	(Spain) Alejandro Galán (Spain) Juan Lebrón	6–4 / 3–6 / 6–3	(Spain) Alex Ruiz (Argentina) Juan Tello	
2/9/2023	(Spain) Coki Nieto (Spain) Jon Sanz	7–5 / 4–6 / 6–3	(Argentina) Fernando Belasteguín (Spain) Miguel Yanguas	

Women's

Date	Team A	Score	Team B	Refs.
2/9/2023	(Spain) Alejandra Salazar (Portugal) Sofia Araújo	7–5 / 6–0	(Argentina) Claudia Jensen (Spain) Verónica Virseda	
2/9/2023	(Spain) Bea González (Argentina) Delfina Brea	6–4 / 6–4	(Spain) Gemma Triay (Spain) Marta Ortega	

=== Finals ===
Men's

Date	Team A	Score	Team B	Refs.
3/9/2023	(Spain) Alejandro Galán (Spain) Juan Lebrón	6–0 / 7–6	(Spain) Coki Nieto (Spain) Jon Sanz	

Women's

Date	Team A	Score	Team B	Refs.
3/9//2023	(Spain) Bea González (Argentina) Delfina Brea	6–4 / 6–1	(Spain) Alejandra Salazar (Portugal) Sofia Araújo	
