= 2022 Paris Major =

Padel championships

- Date: 11 – 17 July
- Edition: 1st
- Category: Major
- Prize money: € 525,000
- Location: Paris, France
- Venue: Stade Roland Garros

Champions
- Men's doubles: (Spain) Alejandro Galán (Spain) Juan Lebrón

Chronology
Previous
Valencia Open (WPT)
Next
Málaga Open (WPT)

The 2022 Paris Major (officially 2022 Greenweez Paris Major) was the third tournament of the season organized by Premier Padel, promoted by the International Padel Federation, and with the financial backing of Nasser Al-Khelaïfi's Qatar Sports Investments.

Alejandro Galán and Juan Lebrón, FIP number 1 ranked team, defeated Federico Chingotto and Juan Tello, FIP number 4 ranked team, in the final, winning their second title in the circuit.

== Seeds ==
1. (Spain) Alejandro Galán / (Spain) Juan Lebrón (winners)
2. (Argentina) Martin Di Nenno / (Spain) Paquito Navarro (semi-finals)
3. (Argentina) Franco Stupaczuk / (Brazil) Pablo Lima (semi-finals)
4. (Argentina) Federico Chingotto / (Argentina) Juan Tello (final)
5. (Spain) Arturo Coello / (Argentina) Fernando Belasteguín (quarter-finals)
6. (Spain) Aléx Ruiz / (Spain) Jerónimo González (round of 16)
7. (Argentina) Lucho Capra/ (Argentina) Maxi Sanchéz (quarter-finals)
8. (Brazil) Lucas Campagnolo / (Spain) Javi Garrido (quarter-finals)

Click on the seed number of a player to go to their draw section.

== Results ==
Round of 32
1	(Spain) Galán / (Spain) Lebrón	6	6
(Spain) R. Méndez / (Spain) S. Oria	2	3
(Spain) I. Sager / (Spain) M. Cordoba	4	2
(Spain) J.G. Diestro / (Spain) P. Fernandéz	6	6
(Spain) J. Ruiz / (Spain) P. Lijó	6	6
(Spain) J.G. Mora / (Spain) R. Durán	3	4
(Brazil) C. Gomes / (Spain) R. Martinez	2	3
5	(Argentina) Belasteguín / (Spain) Coello	6	6
3	(Argentina) F. Stupaczuk / (Brazil) Lima	6	6
(France) A. Maigret / (France) B. Blanque	1	1
(Spain) M. Quilez / (Spain) T. Bueno	6	7	5
(Spain) A. Arroyo / (Spain) G. Rubio	7	6	7
(Argentina) A. Silingo / (Spain) F. Gil	7	6
(Spain) E. Alonso/ (Spain) J. Ruiz	6	3
(Spain) P. García / (Spain) A. Rodriguez	6	3
8	(Brazil) L. Campagnolo / (Spain) J. Garrido	7	6
7	(Argentina) L. Capra / (Argentina) Maxi	6	6
(Spain) J. Serrano / (Chile) J. Valdés	4	2
(Spain) A. Ayats / (Argentina) D. Perino	1	1
(Spain) Coki / (Spain) Yanguas	6	6
(Argentina) J.C. Belluati / (Argentina) R. Moyano	6	6
(Spain) E. Goenaga / (Spain) J. Bautista	3	4
(France) J. Bergeron / (France) T. Leygue	3	2
4	(Argentina) Chingotto / (Argentina) J. Tello	6	6
(Spain) A. Ruíz / (Spain) Momo	2	6	6
(Spain) A. Luque / (Spain) J. Sanz	6	3	4
(Spain) A. Bassas / (Spain) P. Vera	3	6
8	(Spain) J. Leal / (Spain) J. Rico	6	7
(Brazil) L. Bergamini / (Spain) V. Ruiz	6	6	6
(Spain) J. Moya / (Spain) M. del Castillo	2	7	2
(Uruguay) D. Ramos / (Argentina) F. Dominguez	0	1
2	(Argentina) Di Nenno / (Spain) Paquito	6	6

Round of 16
1	(Spain) Galán / (Spain) Lebrón	6	5	6
(Spain) J.G. Diestro / (Spain) P. Fernandéz	1	7	2
(Spain) J. Ruiz / (Spain) P. Lijó	6	7	3
5	(Argentina) Belasteguín / (Spain) Coello	7	5	6
3	(Argentina) F. Stupaczuk / (Brazil) Lima	6	7	6
(Spain) A. Arroyo / (Spain) G. Rubio	7	5	4
(Argentina) A. Silingo / (Spain) F. Gil	6	1	2
6	(Brazil) L. Campagnolo / (Spain) J. Garrido	4	6	6
7	(Argentina) L. Capra / (Argentina) Sánchez	7	6
(Spain) Coki / (Spain) Yanguas	6	4
(Argentina) J.C. Belluati / (Argentina) R. Moyano	4	6	3
4	(Argentina) Chingotto / (Argentina) J. Tello	6	4	6
(Spain) A. Ruíz / (Spain) Momo	6	4
8	(Spain) J. Leal / (Spain) J. Rico	7	6
(Brazil) L. Bergamini / (Spain) V. Ruiz	4	4
8	(Argentina) Di Nenno / (Spain) Paquito	6	6

Quarterfinals
1	(Spain) Galán / (Spain) Lebrón	6	6
5	(Argentina) Belasteguín / (Spain) Coello	2	2
3	(Argentina) F. Stupaczuk / (Brazil) Lima	6	7
8	(Brazil) L. Campagnolo / (Spain) J. Garrido	2	6
7	(Argentina) L. Capra / (Argentina) Maxi	3	3
4	(Argentina) Chingotto / (Argentina) J. Tello	6	6
(Spain) J. Leal / (Spain) J. Rico	3	1
2	(Argentina) Di Nenno / (Spain) Navarro	6	6

Semifinals
1	(Spain) Galán / (Spain) Lebrón	6	6
3	(Argentina) F. Stupaczuk / (Brazil) Lima	1	0
4	(Argentina) Chingotto / (Argentina) J. Tello	7	6
2	(Argentina) Di Nenno / (Spain) Paquito	6	3

Final
1	(Spain) Galán / (Spain) Lebrón	6	4	6
4	(Argentina) Chingotto / (Argentina) J. Tello	3	6	4

=== First Round ===
Date	Winners	Score	Opponent	Refs.
12/7/2022	(Spain) Rafael Méndez (Spain) Salvador Oria	6–3 / 6–3	(Spain) Gaspar Campos (Spain) J.M. Mouliaa	
12/7/2022	(Spain) Ignacio Sager (Spain) Marcos Cordoba	4–6 / 6–3 / 7–6	(France) Jeremy Scatena (Spain) Adria Mercadal	
12/7/2022	(Spain) José Garcia Diestro (Spain) Pincho Fernandéz	6–1 / 7–6	(Spain) Alvaro Cepero (Spain) Cayetano Rocafort	
12/7/2022	(Spain) Javier Ruiz (Spain) Pablo Lijó	7–5 / 7–5	(Spain) Ivan Ramírez (Spain) Miguel Semmler	
12/7/2022	(Spain) Javier García Mora (Spain) Raul Marcos Durán	6–3 / 7–5	(Spain) Mario Ortega (Argentina) Matías Nicoletti	
12/7/2022	(Brazil) Chico Gomes (Spain) R. Martinez Sanchez	6–7 / 6–3 / 7–5	(Spain) Pablo Cardona (Spain) Victor Mena Gil	
12/7/2022	(France) Adrien Maigret (France) Bastien Blanque	4–6 / 6–1 / 7–6	(Spain) Carlos Perez Cabeza (Argentina) Emiliano Iriart	
12/7/2022	(Spain) Marc Quilez (Spain) Toni Bueno	5–7 / 7–5 / 7–6	(Spain) Javier Martinez Vazquez (Spain) Sergio Icardo	
12/7/2022	(Spain) Alejandro Arroyo (Spain) Gonzalo Rubio	6–7 / 6–4 / 6–2	(Spain) Adrian Marques (Spain) Emilio Schez Chamero	
12/7/2022	(Argentina) Agustin Gomez Silingo (Spain) Francisco Gil	3–6 / 6–0 / 6–3	(Spain) Aday Santana (Argentina) Nicolás Suescun	
12/7/2022	(Spain) Eduardo Alonso (Spain) Jorge Ruiz	6–3 / 7–6	(Argentina) Cristian German Gutiérrez (Sweden) Daniel Windahl	
12/7/2022	(Spain) Alonso Rodríguez Martínez (Spain) Pablo García	7–6 / 3–6 / 6–3	(Spain) Ernesto Moreno (Spain) Gonzalez Rodriguez	
12/7/2022	(Chile) Javier Valdés (Spain) Jose David Sanchez Serrano	2–6 / 7–6 / 6–3	(Spain) Javier Gonzalez Barahona (Spain) Juanlu Esbri	
12/7/2022	(Spain) Miguel Gonzalez García (Spain) Pedro Melendez	6–4 / 6–4	(Spain) Arnay Ayats (Argentina) Denis Perino	
12/7/2022	(Spain) Coki Nieto (Spain) Yanguas	6–1 / 6–0	(Spain) Candido Alfaro (Argentina) Juani Mieres	
12/7/2022	(Argentina) Juan Cruz Belluati (Argentina) Ramiro Moyano	7–6 / 2–6 / 6–0	(Argentina) Federico Mouriño (Spain) Cristobal Garcia Blanco	
12/7/2022	(Spain) Enrique Goenaga (Spain) Jairo Bautista	6–4 / 7–6	(Spain) Ignacio Vilariño (Spain) Jaime Muñoz	
12/7/2022	(France) Johan Bergeron (France) ThomasLeygue	7–6 / 7–6	(France) Jerome Inzerillo (France) Maxime Moreau	
12/7/2022	(Spain) Antonio Luque (Spain) Jon Sanz	3–6 / 6–3 / 7–6	(Spain) Francisco Guerrero (Spain) Pepe Aliaga Cruz	
12/7/2022	(Spain) Aitor Bassas (Spain) Pedro Vera	6–3 / 6–4	(Spain) Diego Gil Batista (Spain) Fran Ramirez	
12/7/2022	(Spain) Javi Leal (Spain) Javi Rico	6–3 / 7–6	(France) Benjamin Tison (Spain) Teodoro Zapata	
12/7/2022	(Brazil) Lucas Bergamini (Spain) Victor Ruiz	7–6 / 6–4	(Spain) Christian Fuster (Spain) Miguel Solbes	
12/7/2022	(Spain) Mario Del Castillo (Spain) Jesus Moya	6–4 / 6–7 / 6–3	(Spain) Alvaro Melendez (Argentina) Aris Patiniotis	
12/7/2022	(Argentina) Facundo Dominguez (Uruguay) Diego Ramos	7–6 / 6–2	(Spain) Anton Sans (Spain) Sergio Alba	

=== Round of 32 ===
Date	Winners	Score	Opponent	Refs.
13/7/2022	(Spain) Alejandro Galán (Spain) Juan Lebrón	6–2 / 6–3	(Spain) Rafael Méndez (Spain) Salvador Oria	
13/7/2022	(Spain) José Garcia Diestro (Spain) Pincho Fernandéz	6–4 / 6–2	(Spain) Ignacio Sager (Spain) Marcos Cordoba	
13/7/2022	(Spain) Javier Ruiz (Spain) Pablo Lijó	6–3 / 6–4	(Spain) Javier García Mora (Spain) Raul Marcos Durán	
13/7/2022	(Spain) Arturo Coello (Argentina) Fernando Belasteguín	6–2 / 6–3	(Brazil) Chico Gomes (Spain) R. Martinez Sanchez	
13/7/2022	(Argentina) Franco Stupaczuk (Brazil) Pablo Lima	6–1 / 6–1	(France) Adrien Maigret (France) Bastien Blanque	
13/7/2022	(Spain) Alejandro Arroyo (Spain) Gonzalo Rubio	7–6 / 6–7 / 7–5	(Spain) Marc Quilez (Spain) Toni Bueno	
13/7/2022	(Argentina) Agustin Gomez Silingo (Spain) Francisco Gil	7–6 / 6–3	(Spain) Eduardo Alonso (Spain) Jorge Ruiz	
13/7/2022	(Brazil) Lucas Campagnolo (Spain) Javi Garrido	7–6 / 6–3	(Spain) Alonso Rodríguez Martínez (Spain) Pablo García	
13/7/2022	(Argentina) Lucho Capra (Argentina) Maxi Sánchez	6–4 / 6–2	(Chile) Javier Valdés (Spain) Jose David Sanchez Serrano	
13/7/2022	(Spain) Coki Nieto (Spain) Yanguas	6–1 / 6–1	(Spain) Miguel Gonzalez García (Spain) Pedro Melendez	
13/7/2022	(Argentina) Juan Cruz Belluati (Argentina) Ramiro Moyano	6–3 / 6–4	(Spain) Enrique Goenaga (Spain) Jairo Bautista	
13/7/2022	(Argentina) Federico Chingotto (Argentina) Juan Ignacio Tello	6–3 / 6–2	(France) Johan Bergeron (France) Thomas Leygue	
13/7/2022	(Spain) Alex Ruiz (Spain) Momo Gonzalez	2–6 / 6–3 / 6–4	(Spain) Antonio Luque (Spain) Jon Sanz	
13/7/2022	(Spain) Javi Leal (Spain) Javi Rico	6–3 / 7–6	(Spain) Aitor Bassas (Spain) Pedro Vera	
13/7/2022	(Brazil) Lucas Bergamini (Spain) Victor Ruiz	6–2 / 6–7 / 6–2	(Spain) Mario Del Castillo (Spain) Jesus Moya	
13/7/2022	(Argentina) Martin Di Nenno (Spain) Paquito Navarro	6–0 / 6–1	(Argentina) Facundo Dominguez (Uruguay) Diego Ramos	

=== Round of 16 ===
Date	Winners	Score	Opponent	Refs.
14/7/2022	(Spain) Alejandro Galán (Spain) Juan Lebrón	6–1 / 5–7 / 6–2	(Spain) José Garcia Diestro (Spain) Pincho Fernandéz	
14/7/2022	(Spain) Arturo Coello (Argentina) Fernando Belasteguín	7–6 / 5–7 / 6–3	(Spain) Javier Ruiz (Spain) Pablo Lijó	
14/7/2022	(Argentina) Franco Stupaczuk (Brazil) Pablo Lima	6–7 / 7–5 / 6–4	(Spain) Alejandro Arroyo (Spain) Gonzalo Rubio	
14/7/2022	(Brazil) Lucas Campagnolo (Spain) Javi Garrido	4–6 / 6–1 / 6–2	(Argentina) Agustin Gomez Silingo (Spain) Francisco Gil	
14/7/2022	(Argentina) Lucho Capra (Argentina) Maxi Sánchez	7–6 / 6–4	(Spain) Coki Nieto (Spain) Yanguas	
14/7/2022	(Argentina) Federico Chingotto (Argentina) Juan Ignacio Tello	6–4 / 4–6 / 6–3	(Argentina) Juan Cruz Belluati (Argentina) Ramiro Moyano	
14/7/2022	(Spain) Javi Leal (Spain) Javi Rico	7–6 / 6–4	(Spain) Alex Ruiz (Spain) Momo Gonzalez	
14/7/2022	(Argentina) Martin Di Nenno (Spain) Paquito Navarro	6–4 / 6–4	(Brazil) Lucas Bergamini (Spain) Victor Ruiz	

=== Quarter-Finals ===
Date	Winners	Score	Opponent	Refs.
15/7/2022	(Spain) Alejandro Galán (Spain) Juan Lebrón	6–2 / 6–2	(Spain) Arturo Coello (Argentina) Fernando Belasteguín	
15/7/2022	(Argentina) Franco Stupaczuk (Brazil) Pablo Lima	6–2 / 7–6	(Brazil) Lucas Campagnolo (Spain) Javi Garrido	
15/7/2022	(Argentina) Federico Chingotto (Argentina) Juan Ignacio Tello	6–3 / 6–3	(Argentina) Lucho Capra (Argentina) Maxi Sánchez	
15/7/2022	(Argentina) Martin Di Nenno (Spain) Paquito Navarro	6–3 / 6–1	(Spain) Javi Leal (Spain) Javi Rico	

=== Semi-Finals ===
Date	Winners	Score	Opponent	Refs.
16/7/2022	(Spain) Alejandro Galán (Spain) Juan Lebrón	6–1 / 6–0	(Argentina) Franco Stupaczuk (Brazil) Pablo Lima	
16/7/2022	(Argentina) Federico Chingotto (Argentina) Juan Ignacio Tello	7–6 / 6–3	(Argentina) Martin Di Nenno (Spain) Paquito Navarro	

=== Finals ===
Date	Winners	Score	Opponent	Refs.
17/7/2022	(Spain) Alejandro Galán (Spain) Juan Lebrón	6–3 / 4–6 / 6–4	(Argentina) Federico Chingotto (Argentina) Juan Ignacio Tello	

== Points and prize money ==
=== Points and money distribution ===
Below is a series of tables showing the ranking points and money a player can earn.

Event	First round	Second Round	Round of 16	QF	SF	F	W
Points	40	90	180	360	750	1200	2000
Money	€1475	€2950	€5250	€8550	€13100	€23600	€47300
