= 2022 Italy Major =

Padel championships

- Date: 23 May – 29 May
- Edition: 1st
- Category: Major
- Prize money: € 525,000
- Location: Rome, Italy
- Venue: Foro Italico

Champions
- Men's doubles: (Spain) Alejandro Galán (Spain) Juan Lebrón

Chronology
Previous
Danish Open (WPT)
Next
Marbella Master (WPT)

The 2022 Italy Major was the second tournament of the season organized by Premier Padel, promoted by the International Padel Federation, and with the financial backing of Nasser Al-Khelaïfi's Qatar Sports Investments.

Alejandro Galán and Juan Lebrón, World Padel Tour's number 1 ranked team, defeated Martín Di Nenno and Paquito Navarro, World Padel Tour's number 2 ranked team, in the final, winning their first title in the new circuit.

== Seeds ==
1. (Spain) Alejandro Galán / (Spain) Juan Lebrón (winners)
2. (Argentina) Martin Di Nenno / (Spain) Paquito Navarro (final)
3. (Argentina) Franco Stupaczuk / (Brazil) Pablo Lima (quarter-finals)
4. (Argentina) Federico Chingotto / (Argentina) Juan Tello (semi-finals)
5. (Spain) Arturo Coello / (Argentina) Fernando Belasteguín (semi-finals)
6. (Spain) Aléx Ruiz / (Spain) Jerónimo González (quarter-finals)
7. (Argentina) Lucho Capra/ (Argentina) Maxi Sanchéz (round of 16)
8. (Spain) Javier Ruiz / (Spain) Javier Rico (round of 16)

== Results ==
Round of 32
1 | (Spain) Galán / (Spain) Lebrón | 6 | 6
(Spain) D. Gil / (Spain) A. Melendez | 4 | 1
(Brazil) L. Bergamini/ (Spain) V. Ruiz | 6 | 6 | 2
(Spain) G. Rubio / (Spain) J. Ruiz | 4 | 7 | 6
(Argentina) A. Gutiérrez / (Spain) J. Sanz | 3 | 6 | 6
(Spain) L. González/ (Spain) M. Benítez | 6 | 0 | 2
(Spain) D. Serrano/ (Spain) M. Semmler | 3 | 4
7 | (Argentina) L. Capra / (Argentina) Maxi | 6 | 6
5 | (Argentina) Belasteguín / (Spain) Coello | 7 | 6
(Spain) A. Ayats/ (Spain) J. Muñoz | 6 | 4
(Spain) A. Luque / (Spain) M. del Castillo | 6 | 3 | 6
(Argentina) J.C. Belluati / (Argentina) R. Moyano | 1 | 6 | 3
(Spain) A. Arroyo / (Spain) I. Ramirez | 6 | 6
(Spain) C.P. Cabeza / (Argentina) E. Iriart | 1 | 3
(Italy) D. Cattaneo / (Italy) R. Sinicropi | 2 | 2
3 | (Argentina) F. Stupaczuk / (Brazil) Lima | 6 | 6
4 | (Argentina) Chingotto / (Argentina) Juan Tello | 6 | 6
(France) J. Scatena / (Spain) S. Icardo | 1 | 3
(Argentina) C. Gutiérrez / (Sweden) D. Windahl | 6 | 6
(Spain) I. Zaratiegui / (Spain) J. Rico | 3 | 2
(Argentina) A. Silingo / (Spain) F. Gil | 6 | 6
(Spain) A. Bassas / (Spain) P. Vera | 2 | 2
(Brazil) C. Gomes / (Argentina) M. Nicoletti | 1 | 3
8 | (Spain) J. Rico / (Spain) J. Ruíz | 6 | 6
6 | (Spain) A. Ruíz / (Spain) Momo | 6 | 6 | 6
(Spain) A. Sans/ (Spain) J. Moya | 3 | 7 | 1
(Argentina) D. Perino / (Spain) R. Rivera | 4 | 1
(Spain) Coki / (Spain) Yanguas | 6 | 6
(Spain) A. Cepero / (Spain) P. Lijó | 6 | 6
(Spain) E. Moreno / (Spain) M. Solbes | 4 | 3
(Spain) J.G. Diestro / (Spain) P. Fernandéz | 2 | 1
2 | (Argentina) Di Nenno / (Spain) Paquito | 6 | 6

Round of 16
1 | (Spain) Galán/ (Spain) Lebrón | 6 | 6
(Spain) G. Rubio / (Spain) V. Ruiz | 4 | 2
(Argentina) A. Gutiérrez / (Spain) J. Sanz | 6 | 6
7 | (Argentina) L. Capra / (Argentina) Maxi | 4 | 2
5 | (Argentina) Belasteguín / (Spain) Coello | 6 | 6
(Spain) A. Luque/ (Spain) M. del Castillo | 4 | 3
(Spain) A. Arroyo / (Spain) I. Ramirez | 0 | 4
3 | (Argentina) F. Stupaczuk / (Brazil) Lima | 6 | 6
4 | (Argentina) Chingotto / (Argentina) J. Tello | 6 | 6
(Argentina) C. Gutiérrez / (Sweden) D. Windahl | 4 | 3
(Argentina) A. Silingo / (Spain) F. Gil | 7 | 6
8 | (Spain) J. Rico / (Spain) J. Ruíz | 6 | 4
6 | (Spain) A. Ruíz / (Spain) Momo | 6 | 6
(Spain) Coki / (Spain) Yanguas | 4 | 3
(Spain) J.G. Diestro / (Spain) P. Fernandéz | 1 | 1
2 | (Argentina) Di Nenno / (Spain) Paquito | 6 | 6

Quarterfinals
1 | (Spain) Galán / (Spain) Lebrón | 6 | 6
(Argentina) C. Gutiérrez / (Spain) J. Sanz | 4 | 3
5 | (Argentina) Belasteguín / (Spain) Coello | 7 | 3 | 6
3 | (Argentina) F. Stupaczuk / (Brazil) Lima | 6 | 6 | 4
4 | (Argentina) Chingotto / (Argentina) Tello | 6 | 6
(Argentina) A. Silingo / (Spain) F. Gil | 7 | 4
6 | (Spain) A. Ruíz / (Spain) Momo | 7 | 2 | 2
2 | (Argentina) Di Nenno / (Spain) Paquito | 5 | 6 | 6

Semifinals
1 | (Spain) Galán / (Spain) Lebrón | 6 | 3 | 6
5 | (Argentina) Belasteguín / (Spain) Coello | 4 | 6 | 3
4 | (Argentina) Chingotto / (Argentina) Tello | 2 | 6 | 2
2 | (Argentina) Di Nenno / (Spain) Paquito | 6 | 3 | 6

Final
1 | (Spain) Galán / (Spain) Lebrón | 4 | 7 | 6
2 | (Argentina) Di Nenno / (Spain) Paquito | 6 | 5 | 4

=== First Round ===
| Date | Winners | Score | Opponent | Refs. |
|---|---|---|---|---|
| 24/5/2022 | (Spain) Alvaro Melendez (Spain) Diego Gil | 6/3 6/4 | (Spain) Adrian Ronco (Spain) Jaime Menendez | |
| 24/5/2022 | (Brazil) Lucas Bergamini (Spain) Victor Ruiz | 6–2 / 6–4 | (Spain) Carlos Marti (Spain) David Fernández | |
| 24/5/2022 | (Spain) Gonzalo Rubio (Spain) Jorge Ruiz | 6–3 / 6–4 | (Italy) Luca Mezzetti (Italy) Michele Bruno | |
| 24/5/2022 | (Argentina) Agustín Gutiérrez (Spain) Jon Sanz | 6–4 / 6–1 | (Spain) Christian Fuster (Chile) Javier Valdés | |
| 24/5/2022 | (Spain) Miguel Benítez (Spain) Sergio Icardo | 7–6 / 6–4 | (France) Benjamin Tison (Spain) Teodoro Zapata | |
| 24/5/2022 | (Spain) David Sanchez Serrano (Spain) Miguel Semmler | 6–1 / 6–1 | (Spain) Cristobal Garcia Blanco (Spain) Pedro Meléndez | |
| 24/5/2022 | (Spain) Arnau Ayats (Spain) Jaime Muñoz | 6–3 / 6–4 | (Italy) Federico Beltrami (Italy) Lorenzo Di Giovanni | |
| 24/5/2022 | (Spain) Antonio Luque (Spain) Mario Del Castillo | 6–2 / 6–3 | (Argentina) Marcelo Capitani (Spain) Raul Marcos Duran | |
| 24/5/2022 | (Argentina) Juan Cruz Belluati (Argentina) Ramiro Moyano | 6–2 / 6–1 | (Spain) Javier García Mora; Javier Velasco | |
| 24/5/2022 | (Spain) Alejandro Arroyo (Spain) Ivan Ramirez | 3–6 / 6–1 / 6–2 | (Spain) Marc Quilez (Spain) Toni Bueno | |
| 24/5/2022 | (Spain) Carlos Perez Cabeza (Argentina) Emiliano iriart | 6–3 / 6–4 | (Uruguay) Diego Ramos (Argentina) Juan Manuel Restivo | |
| 24/5/2022 | (Italy) Daniele Cattaneo (Italy) Riccardo Sinicropi | 6–2 / 6–4 | (Italy) Giulio Lovascio (Spain) Salvador Oria | |
| 24/5/2022 | (France) Jeremy Scatena (Spain) Sergio Icardo | 7–6 / 4–6 / 6–3 | (Spain) Ignacio Sager (Spain) Luis Ortega | |
| 24/5/2022 | (Argentina) Cristian German Gutiérrez (Sweden) Daniel Windahl | 6–3 / 7–6 | (Spain) Ignacio Vilariño (Spain) Sergio Alba | |
| 24/5/2022 | (Spain) Iñigo Zaratiegui (Spain) José Rico | 6–2 / 7–6 | (Spain) Cayetano Rocafort (Spain) Gaspar Campos | |
| 24/5/2022 | (Argentina) Agustin Gomez Silingo (Spain) Francisco Gil | 6–2 / 6–1 | (Spain) Miguel Gonzalez García (Spain) Fran Ramirez | |
| 24/5/2022 | (Spain) Aitor Bassas (Spain) Pedro Vera | 6–2 / 6–4 | (Spain) Belar Vera Lopez (Spain) Victor Tur Checa | |
| 24/5/2022 | (Brazil) Chico Gomes (Argentina) Matías Nicoletti | 7–5 / 6–4 | (Spain) Emilio Sanchez Chamero (Spain) Pablo Cardona | |
| 24/5/2022 | (Spain) Anton Sans (Spain) Jesus Moya | 6–7 / 7–5 / 5–2 / W.O. | (Spain) José Jimenez (Spain) Mario Huete | |
| 24/5/2022 | (Argentina) Denis Perino (Spain) Rubén Rivera | 6–4 / 6–4 | (Argentina) Aris Patiniotis (Argentina) Godo Díaz | |
| 24/5/2022 | (Spain) Coki Nieto (Spain) Miguel Yanguas | 6–2 / 6–3 | (Spain) Aday Santana (Argentina) Nicolás Suescun | |
| 24/5/2022 | (Spain) Alvaro Cépero (Spain) Pablo Lijó | 6–3 / 6–2 | (Spain) Luiz Pozo Carballo (Sweden) Simon Vasquez | |
| 24/5/2022 | (Spain) Ernesto Moreno (Spain) Miguel Solbes | 7–6 / 6–2 | (Italy) Marco Cassetta (Italy) Simone Cremona | |
| 24/5/2022 | (Spain) José Garcia Diestro (Spain) Pincho Fernandéz | 4–6 / 7–6 / 6–1 | (Spain) Enrique Goenaga (Spain) Victor Mena Gil | |

=== Round of 32 ===
| Date | Winners | Score | Opponent | Refs. |
|---|---|---|---|---|
| 25/5/2022 | (Spain) Alejandro Galán (Spain) Juan Lebrón | 6–4 / 6–1 | (Spain) Alvaro Melendez (Spain) Diego Gil | |
| 25/5/2022 | (Spain) Gonzalo Rubio (Spain) Jorge Ruiz | 4–6 / 7–6 / 6–2 | (Brazil) Lucas Bergamini (Spain) Victor Ruiz | |
| 25/5/2022 | (Argentina) Agustín Gutiérrez (Spain) Jon Sanz | 3–6 / 6–0 / 6–2 | (Spain) Miguel Benítez (Spain) Sergio Icardo | |
| 25/5/2022 | (Argentina) Lucho Capra (Argentina) Maxi Sánchez | 6–3 / 6–4 | (Spain) David Sanchez Serrano (Spain) Miguel Semmler | |
| 25/5/2022 | (Spain) Arturo Coello (Argentina) Fernando Belasteguín | 7–6 / 6–4 | (Spain) Arnau Ayats (Spain) Jaime Muñoz | |
| 25/5/2022 | (Spain) Antonio Luque (Spain) Mario Del Castillo | 6–1 / 3–6 / 6–3 | (Argentina) Juan Cruz Belluati (Argentina) Ramiro Moyano | |
| 25/5/2022 | (Spain) Alejandro Arroyo (Spain) Ivan Ramirez | 6–1 / 6–3 | (Spain) Carlos Perez Cabeza (Argentina) Emiliano iriart | |
| 25/5/2022 | (Argentina) Franco Stupaczuk (Brazil) Pablo Lima | 6–2 / 6–2 | (Italy) Daniele Cattaneo (Italy) Riccardo Sinicropi | |
| 25/5/2022 | (Argentina) Federico Chingotto (Argentina) Juan Tello | 6–1 / 6–3 | (France) Jeremy Scatena (Spain) Sergio Icardo | |
| 25/5/2022 | (Argentina) Cristian German Gutiérrez (Sweden) Daniel Windahl | 6–3 / 6–4 | (Spain) Iñigo Zaratiegui (Spain) José Rico | |
| 25/5/2022 | (Argentina) Agustin Gomez Silingo (Spain) Francisco Gil | 6–2 / 6–2 | (Spain) Aitor Bassas (Spain) Pedro Vera | |
| 25/5/2022 | (Spain) Javier Rico (Spain) Javier Ruiz | 6–1 / 6–3 | (Brazil) Chico Gomes (Argentina) Matías Nicoletti | |
| 25/5/2022 | (Spain) Alex Ruiz (Spain) Momo Gonzalez | 6–3 / 6–7 / 6–1 | (Spain) Anton Sans (Spain) Jesus Moya | |
| 25/5/2022 | (Spain) Coki Nieto (Spain) Miguel Yanguas | 6–4 / 6–1 | (Argentina) Denis Perino (Spain) Rubén Rivera | |
| 25/5/2022 | (Spain) Alvaro Cépero (Spain) Pablo Lijó | 6–4 / 6–3 | (Spain) Ernesto Moreno (Spain) Miguel Solbes | |
| 25/5/2022 | (Argentina) Martin Di Nenno (Spain) Paquito Navarro | 6–2 / 6–1 | (Spain) José Garcia Diestro (Spain) Pincho Fernandéz | |

=== Round of 16 ===
| Date | Winners | Score | Opponent | Refs. |
|---|---|---|---|---|
| 26/5/2022 | (Spain) Alejandro Galán (Spain) Juan Lebrón | 6–4 / 6–2 | (Spain) Gonzalo Rubio (Spain) Jorge Ruiz | |
| 26/5/2022 | (Argentina) Agustín Gutiérrez (Spain) Jon Sanz | 6–4 / 6–2 | (Argentina) Lucho Capra (Argentina) Maxi Sánchez | |
| 26/5/2022 | (Spain) Arturo Coello (Argentina) Fernando Belasteguín | 6–4 / 6–3 | (Spain) Antonio Luque (Spain) Mario Del Castillo | |
| 26/5/2022 | (Argentina) Franco Stupaczuk (Brazil) Pablo Lima | 6–0 / 6–4 | (Spain) Alejandro Arroyo (Spain) Ivan Ramirez | |
| 26/5/2022 | (Argentina) Federico Chingotto (Argentina) Juan Tello | 6–4 / 6–3 | (Argentina) Cristian German Gutiérrez (Sweden) Daniel Windahl | |
| 26/5/2022 | (Argentina) Agustin Gomez Silingo (Spain) Francisco Gil | 7–6 / 6–4 | (Spain) Javier Rico (Spain) Javier Ruiz | |
| 26/5/2022 | (Spain) Alex Ruiz (Spain) Momo Gonzalez | 6–4 / 6–3 | (Spain) Coki Nieto (Spain) Miguel Yanguas | |
| 26/5/2022 | (Argentina) Martin Di Nenno (Spain) Paquito Navarro | 6–1 / 6–1 | (Spain) Alvaro Cépero (Spain) Pablo Lijó | |

=== Quarter-Finals ===
| Date | Winners | Score | Opponent | Refs. |
|---|---|---|---|---|
| 27/5/2022 | (Spain) Alejandro Galán (Spain) Juan Lebrón | 6–4 / 6–3 | (Argentina) Agustín Gutiérrez (Spain) Jon Sanz | |
| 27/5/2022 | (Spain) Arturo Coello (Argentina) Fernando Belasteguín | 7–6 / 3–6 / 6–4 | (Argentina) Franco Stupaczuk (Brazil) Pablo Lima | |
| 27/5/2022 | (Argentina) Federico Chingotto (Argentina) Juan Tello | 6–3 / 6–4 | (Argentina) Agustin Gomez Silingo (Spain) Francisco Gil | |
| 27/5/2022 | (Argentina) Martin Di Nenno (Spain) Paquito Navarro | 5–7 / 6–2 / 6–2 | (Spain) Alex Ruiz (Spain) Momo Gonzalez | |

=== Semi-Finals ===
| Date | Winners | Score | Opponent | Refs. |
|---|---|---|---|---|
| 28/5/2022 | (Spain) Alejandro Galán (Spain) Juan Lebrón | 6–4 / 3–6 / 6–3 | (Spain) Arturo Coello (Argentina) Fernando Belasteguín | |
| 28/5/2022 | (Argentina) Martin Di Nenno (Spain) Paquito Navarro | 6–2 / 3–6 / 6–2 | (Argentina) Federico Chingotto (Argentina) Juan Tello | |

=== Finals ===
| Date | Winners | Score | Opponent | Refs. |
|---|---|---|---|---|
| 29/5/2022 | (Spain) Alejandro Galán (Spain) Juan Lebrón | 4–6 / 7–5 / 6–4 | (Argentina) Martin Di Nenno (Spain) Paquito Navarro | |

== Points and prize money ==
=== Points and money distribution ===
Below is a series of tables showing the ranking points and money a player can earn.

| Event | First round | Second Round | Round of 16 | QF | SF | F | W |
| Points | 40 | 90 | 180 | 360 | 750 | 1200 | 2000 |
| Money | €1500 | €2900 | €5250 | €8500 | €13000 | €23600 | €47300 |
