= 2019 WPT Argentina Master =

World Padel Tour tournament held in Buenos Aires, Argentina

- Date: 4 – 9 June
- Edition: 6th (Note: The first edition was held in Cordóba and the second in Rio Gallegos, both as Open's.)
- Category: Master
- Location: Buenos Aires, Argentina
- Venue: La Rural

Champions
- Men's doubles: (Spain) Alejandro Galán (Spain) Juani Mieres

Chronology

The 2019 Argentina Master (officially 2019 World Padel Tour Buenos Aires Pádel Máster or also known as 2019 Buenos Aires Master) was the sixth tournament of the seventh season organized by World Padel Tour, the most prestigious padel circuit at the time.

For the first time this season, the tournament did not feature a women's draw.

In the men’s category, for the first time in the 2019 season, neither of the two top-ranked pairs reached the finals, with the third and fourth-seeded pairs reaching to the championship match. In the decisive encounter, Fernando Belasteguín and Pablo Lima, playing in their second final of the year and their last tournament as a pair, were forced to retire with the score at 5–5 in the first set. This handed the title to Alejandro Galán and Juani Mieres, marking their first victory as a team and the first for the pair on Argentine soil (the third in Argentina for Juani Mieres, who had previously won the 2011 Mendoza International and the 2013 Villa Carlos Paz Open).

== Relevant Data ==
=== A legend returns to the court one last time ===
For this tournament, a wildcard entry into the main draw was granted to Roberto Gattiker, one of the greatest players in the history of padel and a seven-time world number one, who competed in the event alongside the Argentine player Denis Perino.

=== Belasteguín and Lima: The partnership that dominated the WPT comes to an end ===
After thirteen years alongside Juan Martín Díaz, a period during which they dominated the padel scene, Fernando Belasteguín chose Pablo Lima as his new partner. Together, they went on to dominate the world of padel, securing over 30 titles and holding the world number one spot for three consecutive years. However, an injury to Belasteguín last season caused the pair to drop to second in the rankings, behind Maxi Sánchez and Sanyo Gutiérrez.

Now, in their fifth consecutive year playing together, Belasteguín (currently 40) and Lima (32) held the third-place spot in the rankings, having in the five tournaments played so far this season, reached one final and four semifinals (losing on every occasion to Lebrón and Paquito), which led Bela to decide that it was time to bring this chapter to a close.

Pablo Lima would join forces with Alejandro Galán, while Fernando Belasteguín choose to form a partnership with one of the sport’s rising stars, the young Agustín Tapia. Tapia had previously been playing alongside Belasteguín’s former partner, Juan Martín Díaz, who was now sidelined due to an injury.

=== Belasteguín and Lima out of the Valladolid Master and Swedish Open ===
Due to the injury Fernando Belasteguín sustained during the tournament final, he and Pablo Lima would also be unable to compete in the Valladolid Master and the Swedish Open, as they were already registered to play together in those events. Both had previously committed to three additional tournaments: the Buenos Aires and Valladolid Masters, as well as the Swedish Open, for which they had signed up before officially announcing their split.

Regarding his injury, Belasteguín stated:

"Fortunately, there is no tendon tear, now it’s time to rest and recover. There is no tendon rupture in my leg, and surgery will not be required. I won’t be sidelined for eight or nine months. In the worst-case scenario, I’ll just miss the summer season."

Commenting on his split from Lima, he added:

"After our defeat in Jaén, Pablo and I spoke in the locker room. It wasn’t just because of the loss, in an athlete’s life, you lose more often than you win. We decided we needed to reflect, and three days later, during an Adeslas event, I told him it was time for a change."

"I felt we were lacking passion. We were comfortable on the court, but that necessary drive was missing. I approach both life and sport, everything I do, with passion. Pablo was more inclined to finish out the season, and he even offered to make an effort and keep playing with me until the end of the year. I told him that we couldn’t just play together by 'making an effort', you really need to enjoy it."

== Head-to-head record between teams ranked in the top 4 during the season ==
=== Men's ===
Record	Maxi–Sanyo	Belasteguín–Lima	Lebrón–Paquito	Galán–J. Mieres
Maxi–Sanyo	—	—	3–1	1–1
Belasteguín–Lima	—	—	0–5	0–1
Lebrón–Paquito	1–3	5–0	—	—
Galán–J. Mieres	1–1	1–0	—	—

== Draws ==
=== Men's Bracket ===
Round of 32
1	(Argentina) Maxi / (Argentina) Sanyo	6	6
Q	(Spain) N. Gadea / (Spain) R. Méndez	1	2
(Spain) R. Rivera / (Spain) T. Bueno	6	6
(Argentina) A. Patiniotis / (Spain) J. Barahona	7	7
(Spain) J.C. Belluati / (Spain) P. Lijó	4	7	6
(Spain) A. Santana / (Argentina) Godo Díaz	6	5	3
(Argentina) A. Allemandi / (Argentina) A. Silingo	6	6
(Argentina) C. Gutiérrez / (Argentina) R. Moyano	2	1
(Spain) J. Ruiz / (Spain) U. Botello	6	6
(Brazil) L. Bergamini / (Brazil) L. Campagnolo	3	4
WC	(Argentina) M. Del Moral / (Argentina) S. Frugoni	3	4
(Spain) Á. Cepero / (Argentina) S. Nerone	6	6
(Uruguay) D. Ramos / (Argentina) J. Restivo	6	4	2
(Spain) A. Ruiz / (Spain) M. Piñeiro	4	6	6
Q	(Argentina) J. Vazquez / (Brazil) M. Jardim	3	5
4	(Spain) Galán / (Spain) J. Mieres	6	7
3	(Spain) Lebrón / (Spain) Paquito	6	6
(Argentina) M. Marina / (Spain) Momo	3	1
WC	(Argentina) D. Perino / (Argentina) R. Gattiker	6	6	6
(Argentina) F. Poggi / (Argentina) M. Grabiel	3	7	1
(Brazil) F. Gomes / (Argentina) G. Tamame	6	6
Q	(Spain) G. Company / (Spain) R. Martinez	3	3
(Argentina) F. Quiles / (Spain) J.G. Diestro	2	0
(Argentina) F.Stupaczuk / (Spain) M. Díaz	6	6
(Argentina) L. Capra / (Argentina) M. Lamperti	6	6
(Spain) J. Rico / (Spain) V. Ruiz	3	3
Q	(Spain) A. Blanco / (Spain) J. Martinez	4	6	6
(Spain) G. Rubio / (Spain) E. Moreno	6	2	4
(Argentina) F. Chingotto / (Argentina) J. Tello	6	6
(Argentina) M. Nicoletti / (Spain) P.A. Martínez	4	3
(Spain) Coki / (Spain) J. Rico	5	3
2	(Argentina) Belasteguín / (Brazil) Lima	7	6

Round of 16
1	(Argentina) Maxi / (Argentina) Sanyo	6	6
(Argentina) A. Patiniotis / (Spain) J. Barahona	2	1
(Spain) J.C. Belluati / (Spain) P. Lijó	6	4
(Argentina) A. Allemandi / (Argentina) A. Silingo	7	6
(Spain) J. Ruiz / (Spain) U. Botello	7	6
(Spain) Á. Cepero / (Argentina) S. Nerone	6	1
(Spain) A. Ruiz / (Spain) M. Piñeiro	3	5
4	(Spain) Galán / (Spain) J. Mieres	6	7
3	(Spain) Lebrón / (Spain) Paquito	6	6
WC	(Argentina) D. Perino / (Argentina) R. Gattiker	1	1
(Brazil) F. Gomes / (Argentina) G. Tamame	1	2
(Argentina) F.Stupaczuk / (Spain) M. Díaz	6	6
(Argentina) L. Capra / (Argentina) M. Lamperti	6	6
Q	(Spain) A. Blanco / (Spain) J. Martinez	2	1
(Argentina) F. Chingotto / (Argentina) J. Tello	1	4
2	(Argentina) Belasteguín / (Brazil) Lima	6	6

Quarter-Final
1	(Argentina) Maxi / (Argentina) Sanyo	6	6
(Argentina) A. Allemandi / (Argentina) A. Silingo	0	4
(Spain) J. Ruiz / (Spain) U. Botello	7	4	3
4	(Spain) Galán / (Spain) J. Mieres	6	6	6
3	(Spain) Lebrón / (Spain) Paquito	6	2	0
(Argentina) F.Stupaczuk / (Spain) M. Díaz	1	6	6
(Argentina) L. Capra / (Argentina) M. Lamperti	6	3	5
2	(Argentina) Belasteguín / (Brazil) Lima	4	6	7

Semi-Finals
1	(Argentina) Maxi / (Argentina) Sanyo	4	6	3
4	(Spain) Galán / (Spain) J. Mieres	6	3	6
(Argentina) F.Stupaczuk / (Spain) M. Díaz	6	2
2	(Argentina) Belasteguín / (Brazil) Lima	7	6

Finals
4	(Spain) Galán / (Spain) J. Mieres	5	*
2	(Argentina) Belasteguín / (Brazil) Lima	5

== Results ==
=== Round of 32 ===
Date	Winners	Score	Opponent	Refs.
5/6/2019	(Argentina) Maxi Sánchez (Argentina) Sanyo Gutiérrez	6–1 / 6–2	(Spain) Nacho Gadea (Spain) Rafael Méndez	
5/6/2019	(Argentina) Aris Patiniotis (Spain) Javier Barahona	7–6 / 7–6	(Spain) Rubén Rivera (Spain) Toni Bueno	
5/6/2019	(Argentina) Juan Cruz Belluati (Spain) Pablo Lijó	4–6 / 7–5 / 6–3	(Spain) Aday Santana (Argentina) Godo Díaz	
5/6/2019	(Argentina) Agustin Goméz Silingo (Argentina) Adrián Allemandi	6–2 / 6–1	(Argentina) Cristian Gutiérrez (Argentina) Ramiro Moyano	
5/6/2019	(Spain) Javi Ruiz (Spain) Uri Botello	6–3 / 6–4	(Brazil) Lucas Bergamini (Brazil) Lucas Campagnolo	
5/6/2019	(Spain) Álvaro Cepero (Argentina) Sebastián Nerone	6–3 / 6–4	(Argentina) Matías Del Moral (Argentina) Santiago Frugoni	
5/6/2019	(Spain) Alejandro Ruiz (Spain) Martin Sánchez Piñeiro	4–6 / 6–4 / 6–2	(Uruguay) Diego Ramos (Argentina) Juan Manuel Restivo	
5/6/2019	(Spain) Alejandro Galán (Spain) Juani Mieres	6–3 / 7–5	(Argentina) Juan Manuel Vazquez (Brazil) Marcelo Jardim	
5/6/2019	(Spain) Juan Lebrón (Spain) Paquito Navarro	6–3 / 6–1	(Argentina) Matías Marina Artusa (Spain) Momo González	
5/6/2019	(Argentina) Denis Perino (Argentina) Roby Gattiker	6–3 / 6–7 / 6–1	(Argentina) Fernando Poggi (Argentina) Maxi Grabiel	
5/6/2019	(Brazil) Francisco Gomes (Argentina) Germán Tamame	6–3 / 6–3	(Spain) Gerard Company (Spain) Ricardo Martinez Sánchez	
5/6/2019	(Argentina) Franco Stupaczuk (Spain) Matías Díaz	6–2 / 6–0	(Argentina) Federico Quiles (Spain) José García Diestro	
5/6/2019	(Argentina) Lucho Capra (Argentina) Miguel Lamperti	6–3 / 6–3	(Spain) José Rico (Spain) Víctor Ruiz	
5/6/2019	(Spain) Adrián Blanco (Spain) Javier Martinez Vazquez	4–6 / 6–2 / 6–4	(Spain) Gonzalo Rubio (Spain) Ernesto Moreno	
5/6/2019	(Argentina) Federico Chingotto (Argentina) Juan Tello	6–4 / 6–3	(Argentina) Matías Nicoletti (Spain) Pedro Alonso Martínez	
5/6/2019	(Argentina) Fernando Belasteguín (Brazil) Pablo Lima	7–5 / 6–3	(Spain) Coki Nieto (Spain) Javi Rico	

=== Round of 16 ===
Date	Winners	Score	Opponent	Refs.
6/6/2019	(Argentina) Maxi Sánchez (Argentina) Sanyo Gutiérrez	6–2 / 6–1	(Argentina) Aris Patiniotis (Spain) Javier Barahona	
6/6/2019	(Argentina) Agustin Goméz Silingo (Argentina) Adrián Allemandi	7–6 / 6–4	(Argentina) Juan Cruz Belluati (Spain) Pablo Lijó	
6/6/2019	(Spain) Javi Ruiz (Spain) Uri Botello	7–6 / 6–1	(Spain) Álvaro Cepero (Argentina) Sebastián Nerone	
6/6/2019	(Spain) Alejandro Galán (Spain) Juani Mieres	6–3 / 7–5	(Spain) Alejandro Ruiz (Spain) Martin Sánchez Piñeiro	
6/6/2019	(Spain) Juan Lebrón (Spain) Paquito Navarro	6–1 / 6–1	(Argentina) Denis Perino (Argentina) Roby Gattiker	
6/6/2019	(Argentina) Franco Stupaczuk (Spain) Matías Díaz	6–1 / 6–2	(Brazil) Francisco Gomes (Argentina) Germán Tamame	
6/6/2019	(Argentina) Lucho Capra (Argentina) Miguel Lamperti	6–2 / 6–1	(Spain) Adrián Blanco (Spain) Javier Martinez Vazquez	
6/6/2019	(Argentina) Fernando Belasteguín (Brazil) Pablo Lima	6–1 / 6–4	(Argentina) Federico Chingotto (Argentina) Juan Tello	

=== Quarter-Finals ===
Date	Winners	Score	Opponent	Refs.
7/6/2019	(Argentina) Maxi Sánchez (Argentina) Sanyo Gutiérrez	6–0 / 6–4	(Argentina) Agustin Goméz Silingo (Argentina) Adrián Allemandi	
7/6/2019	(Spain) Alejandro Galán (Spain) Juani Mieres	6–7 / 6–4 / 6–3	(Spain) Javi Ruiz (Spain) Uri Botello	
7/6/2019	(Argentina) Franco Stupaczuk (Spain) Matías Díaz	1–6 / 6–2 / 6–0	(Spain) Juan Lebrón (Spain) Paquito Navarro	
7/6/2019	(Argentina) Fernando Belasteguín (Brazil) Pablo Lima	4–6 / 6–3 / 7–5	(Argentina) Lucho Capra (Argentina) Miguel Lamperti	

=== Semi-Finals ===
Date	Winners	Score	Opponent	Refs.
8/6/2019	(Spain) Alejandro Galán (Spain) Juani Mieres	6–4 / 3–6 / 6–3	(Argentina) Maxi Sánchez (Argentina) Sanyo Gutiérrez	
8/6/2019	(Argentina) Fernando Belasteguín (Brazil) Pablo Lima	7–6 / 6–2	(Argentina) Franco Stupaczuk (Spain) Matías Díaz	

=== Finals ===
Date	Winners	Score	Opponent	Refs.
9/6/2019	(Spain) Alejandro Galán (Spain) Juani Mieres	5–5 / W.O.	(Argentina) Fernando Belasteguín (Brazil) Pablo Lima	
