= 2023 Malmö Open =

Padel championships

- Date: 6 – 12 November
- Edition: 2nd
- Category: Open
- Location: (Spain) Malmö, Sweden
- Venue: Malmö Arena

Champions
- Men's doubles: (Spain) Alejandro Galán (Spain) Juan Lebrón
- Women's doubles: (Spain) Bea González (Argentina) Delfi Brea

Chronology

The WPT 2023 Malmö Open (officially WPT 2023 Areco Malmö Padel Open) was the twentieth tournament of the eleventh edition of World Padel Tour. The tournament was played between 6th November and 12th November of 2023 at Malmö Arena in Malmö, Sweden.

In the women's category, the third and fourth ranked pairs met in the finals, with the number three team Bea González and Delfina Brea defeating Alejandra Salazar and Sofia Araújo to win their third title as pair.

In the men's category, the second and third ranked teams met in the finals, with Alejandro Galán and Juan Lebrón defeating the second ranked Franco Stupaczuk and Martin Di Nenno, winning their fourth title since Lebrón returned six tournaments before.

== Schedule ==
The final draw was played:

- Thursday 8 November: Round of 32.
- Thursday 9 November: Round of 16.
- Friday 10 November: Quarterfinals.
- Saturday 11 November: Semifinals.
- Sunday 12 November: Finals.

== Results ==
=== Men's Bracket ===
Round of 32
1	(Spain) Coello / (Argentina) Tapia	6	6
(Spain) G. Rubio / (Spain) P. Fernandez	3	4
(Spain) J. Ruiz / (Spain) P. Cardona	7	6
(Argentina) L. Augsburger / (Argentina) V. Libaak	5	4
(Spain) C. Alfaro / (Spain) P. Valverde	0	6
(Spain) J.M. Díaz / (Argentina) M. Lamperti	6	7
(Spain) F. Gil / (Argentina) R. Moyano	5	7	4
8	(Argentina) A. Gutiérrez / (Argentina) Sanyo	7	6	6
5	(Spain) A. Ruiz / (Argentina) J. Tello	2	6	6
(Sweden) D. Windahl / (Sweden) S. Vsaquez	6	4	2
(Spain) J. Rico / (Spain) R. Mendez	7	3	3
(Spain) A. Arroyo / (Spain) E. Alonso	6	6	6
(Spain) A. Cepero / (Spain) M. Del Castillo	1	6	3
(Spain) M. Yanguas / (Spain) P.G. Rodrigo	6	4	6
(Spain) J. Fermosell / (Spain) J. Marmolejo	2	4
3	(Spain) Galán / (Spain) Lebrón	6	6
(Spain) A. Marques / (Spain) A. Rodriguez	5	0
(Spain) J. Rico / (Spain) M. Benitez	7	6
(Spain) J. Esbri / (Brazil) L. Campagnolo	6	7
(Spain) G. Collado / (Argentina) M. Andornino	4	5
(Spain) J. Leal / (Spain) J.G. Diestro	3	6
(Spain) J. Bautista / (Spain) J. Muñoz	6	7
(Brazil) L. Bergamini / (Spain) V. Ruiz	6	3	6
7	(Spain) Coki / (Spain) J. Sanz	3	6	3
6	(Spain) J. Garrido / (Spain) Momo	6	6
(Sweden) A. Axelsson / (Sweden) A. Olsson	3	2
(Spain) J.G. Mora / (Spain) J.G. Barahona	6	7
(Argentina) A. Chozas / (Argentina) L. Capra	3	6
(Spain) A. Ayats / (Argentina) J.C. Belluati	4	6	3
(Spain) A. Sans / (Spain) D. Sanchez	6	1	6
(Spain) F. Guerrero / (Spain) T. Zapata	3	2
2	(Argentina) F. Stupaczuk / (Argentina) Di Nenno	6	6

Round of 16
1	(Spain) Coello / (Argentina) Tapia	6	7
(Spain) J. Ruiz / (Spain) P. Cardona	4	5
(Spain) J.M. Díaz / (Argentina) M. Lamperti	7	4	5
8	(Argentina) A. Gutiérrez / (Argentina) Sanyo	6	6	7
5	(Spain) A. Ruiz / (Argentina) J. Tello	2	3
(Spain) A. Arroyo / (Spain) E. Alonso	6	6
(Spain) M. Yanguas / (Spain) P.G. Rodrigo	2	6	2
3	(Spain) Galán / (Spain) Lebrón	6	4	6
(Spain) J. Rico / (Spain) M. Benitez	2	1
(Spain) J. Esbri / (Brazil) L. Campagnolo	6	6
(Spain) J. Bautista / (Spain) J. Muñoz	3	3
(Brazil) L. Bergamini / (Spain) V. Ruiz	6	6
6	(Spain) J. Garrido / (Spain) Momo	7	5	6
(Spain) J.G. Mora / (Spain) J.G. Barahona	6	7	3
(Spain) A. Sans / (Spain) D. Sanchez	1	1
2	(Argentina) F. Stupaczuk / (Argentina) Di Nenno	6	6

Quarter-Final
1	(Spain) Coello / (Argentina) Tapia	4	6	6
8	(Argentina) A. Gutiérrez / (Argentina) Sanyo	6	4	1
(Spain) A. Arroyo / (Spain) E. Alonso	4	3
3	(Spain) Galán / (Spain) Lebrón	6	6
(Spain) J. Esbri / (Brazil) L. Campagnolo	3	5
(Brazil) L. Bergamini / (Spain) V. Ruiz	6	7
6	(Spain) J. Garrido / (Spain) Momo	6	0
2	(Argentina) F. Stupaczuk / (Argentina) Di Nenno	7	6

Semi-Finals
1	(Spain) Coello / (Argentina) Tapia	2	1
3	(Spain) Galán / (Spain) Lebrón	6	6
(Brazil) L. Bergamini / (Spain) V. Ruiz	2	7	1
2	(Argentina) F. Stupaczuk / (Argentina) Di Nenno	6	6	6

Finals
3	(Spain) Galán / (Spain) Lebrón	6	6
2	(Argentina) F. Stupaczuk / (Argentina) Di Nenno	3	4

=== Women's Bracket ===
Round of 32
1	(Spain) A. Sánchez / (Spain) P. Josemaria
Bye
(Spain) A.F. de Ossó / (Spain) M. Villalba	3	6	6
(Sweden) A. Behram / (Sweden) L. Björk	6	0	2
(Spain) C. Goenaga / (Spain) L. Martínez	6	3	4
(Sweden) C. Navarro / (Spain) M. Guinart	3	6	6
(Spain) M. Caparros / (Spain) T. Navarro	0	0
7	(Argentina) C. Jensen / (Spain) V. Virseda	6	6
5	(Spain) T. Icardo / (Argentina) V. Riera	7	7
(Spain) L.R. Abajo / (Spain) S. Bellver	6	6
(Sweden) A. Girdo / (Sweden) S. Arvidsson	6	3
(Spain) L. Arruabarrena / (Spain) M. Arellano	7	6
(Spain) A. Martinez / (Spain) S. Ruiz	4	4
(Spain) A. Alonso / (Spain) A. Ustero	6	6
Bye
4	(Spain) A. Salazar / (Portugal) S. Araújo
3	(Spain) B. González / (Argentina) D. Brea
Bye
(Spain) C. Fernandez / (Spain) V. Iglesias	6	4	4
(France) A. Collombon / (Spain) L. Rufo	1	6	6
(Italy) C. Orsi / (Spain) C. Mesa	5	6	5
(Spain) M. Martínez / (Spain) S. Saiz	7	4	7
(Spain) A. Perez / (Spain) P. Martínez	4	7	4
8	(Spain) Majo / (Spain) Mapi	6	5	6
6	(Argentina) A. Osoro / (Spain) J. Castelló	6	6
(Spain) N. Rodriguez / (Spain) M. Talaván	4	1
(Spain) L. Sainz / (Spain) P. Llaguno	7	6
(Spain) A. Cañellas / (Spain) N. Aguilar	6	3
(Portugal) A. Nogueira / (Spain) B. Caldera	7	7
(Spain) M. Barrera / (Spain) M. Merino	5	6
Bye
2	(Spain) G. Triay / (Spain) M. Ortega

Round of 16
1	(Spain) A. Sánchez / (Spain) P. Josemaria	6	6
(Spain) A.F. de Ossó / (Spain) M. Villalba	3	0
(Sweden) C. Navarro / (Spain) M. Guinart	2	1
7	(Argentina) C. Jensen / (Spain) V. Virseda	6	6
5	(Spain) T. Icardo / (Argentina) V. Riera	6	6
(Spain) L. Arruabarrena / (Spain) M. Arellano	3	3
(Spain) A. Alonso / (Spain) A. Ustero	1	2
4	(Spain) A. Salazar / (Portugal) S. Araújo	6	6
3	(Spain) B. González / (Argentina) D. Brea	6	6
(France) A. Collombon / (Spain) L. Rufo	3	2
(Spain) M. Martínez / (Spain) S. Saiz	3	3
8	(Spain) Majo / (Spain) Mapi	6	6
6	(Argentina) A. Osoro / (Spain) J. Castelló	6	1	6
(Spain) L. Sainz / (Spain) P. Llaguno	3	6	7
(Portugal) A. Nogueira / (Spain) B. Caldera	2	0
2	(Spain) G. Triay / (Spain) M. Ortega	6	6

Quarter-Final
1	(Spain) A. Sánchez / (Spain) P. Josemaria	6	6
7	(Argentina) C. Jensen / (Spain) V. Virseda	4	3
5	(Spain) T. Icardo / (Argentina) V. Riera	4	4
4	(Spain) A. Salazar / (Portugal) S. Araújo	6	6
3	(Spain) B. González / (Argentina) D. Brea	6	6
8	(Spain) Majo / (Spain) Mapi	3	2
(Spain) L. Sainz / (Spain) P. Llaguno	6	1	0
2	(Spain) G. Triay / (Spain) M. Ortega	4	6	6

Semi-Finals
1	(Spain) A. Sánchez / (Spain) P. Josemaria	2	2
4	(Spain) A. Salazar / (Portugal) S. Araújo	6	6
3	(Spain) B. González / (Argentina) D. Brea	6	6
2	(Spain) G. Triay / (Spain) M. Ortega	2	3

Finals
4	(Spain) A. Salazar / (Portugal) S. Araújo	4	3
3	(Spain) B. González / (Argentina) D. Brea	6	6

=== Round of 32 ===
Men's

Date	Winners	Score	Opponent	Refs.
8/11/2023	(Argentina) Agustín Tapia (Spain) Arturo Coello	6–3 / 6–4	(Spain) Gonzalo Rubio (Spain) Pincho Fernandez	
8/11/2023	(Spain) Javier Ruiz (Spain) Pablo Cardona	7–5 / 6–4	(Argentina) Leo Augsburger (Argentina) Valentino Libaak	
8/11/2023	(Spain) Juan Martín Díaz (Argentina) Miguel Lamperti	6–0 / 7–6	(Spain) Candido Jorge Alfaro (Spain) Pablo Castillo Valverde	
8/11/2023	(Argentina) Agustín Gutiérrez (Argentina) Sanyo Gutiérrez	7–5 / 6–7 / 6–4	(Spain) Francisco Gil (Argentina) Ramiro Moyano	
8/11/2023	(Spain) Alex Ruiz (Argentina) Juan Tello	2–6 / 6–4 / 6–2	(Sweden) Daniel Windahl (Sweden) Simon Vsaquez	
8/11/2023	(Spain) Alejandro Arroyo (Spain) Eduardo Alonso	6–7 / 6–3 / 6–3	(Spain) Javi Rico (Spain) Rafael Mendez	
8/11/2023	(Spain) Miguel Yanguas (Spain) Pablo Garcia Rodrigo	6–1 / 4–6 / 6–3	(Spain) Alvaro Cepero (Spain) Mario Del Castillo	
8/11/2023	(Spain) Alejandro Galán (Spain) Juan Lebrón	6–2 / 6–4	(Spain) Jaime Fermosell (Spain) José Solano Marmolejo	
8/11/2023	(Spain) Jose Rico (Spain) Miguel Benitez	7–5 / 6–0	(Spain) Adrian Marques (Spain) Alonso Rodriguez	
8/11/2023	(Spain) Juanlu Esbri (Brazil) Lucas Campagnolo	6–4 / 7–5	(Spain) Guillermo Collado (Argentina) Martin Andornino	
8/11/2023	(Spain) Jairo Bautista (Spain) Jaime Muñoz	6–3 / 7–6	(Spain) Javier Leal (Spain) José García Diestro	
8/11/2023	(Brazil) Lucas Bergamini (Spain) Víctor Ruiz	6–3 / 3–6 / 6–3	(Spain) Coki Nieto (Spain) Jon Sanz	
8/11/2023	(Spain) Javi Garrido (Spain) Momo González	6–3 / 6–2	(Sweden) Adam Axelsson (Sweden) Albin Olsson	
8/11/2023	(Spain) Javier García Mora (Spain) Javier Gonzalez Barahona	6–3 / 7–6	(Argentina) Alex Chozas (Argentina) Lucho Capra	
8/11/2023	(Spain) Antón Sans (Spain) David Gala Sanchez	6–4 / 1–6 / 6–3	(Spain) Arnau Ayats (Argentina) Juan Cruz Belluati	
8/11/2023	(Argentina) Franco Stupaczuk (Argentina) Martin Di Nenno	6–3 / 6–2	(Spain) Francisco Guerrero (Spain) Teodoro Zapata	

Women's

Date	Winners	Score	Opponent	Refs.
8/11/2023	(Spain) Ana Fernandez de Ossó (Spain) Mari Carmen Villalba	3–6 / 6–0 / 6–2	(Sweden) Ajla Behram (Sweden) Linnea Björk	
8/11/2023	(Sweden) Carolina Navarro (Spain) Marina Guinart	3–6 / 6–3 / 6–4	(Spain) Carmen Goenaga (Spain) Lucía Martínez	
8/11/2023	(Argentina) Claudia Jensen (Spain) Verónica Virseda	6–0 / 6–0	(Spain) Marta Caparros (Spain) Teresa Navarro	
8/11/2023	(Spain) Tamara Icardo (Argentina) Virginia Riera	7–6 / 7–6	(Spain) Laia Rodriguez Abajo (Spain) Sandra Bellver	
8/11/2023	(Spain) Lara Arruabarrena (Spain) Marta Arellano	7–6 / 6–3	(Sweden) Amanda Girdo (Sweden) Sofia Arvidsson	
8/11/2023	(Spain) Alejandra Alonso (Spain) Andrea Ustero	6–4 / 6–4	(Spain) Araceli Martinez (Spain) Sara Ruiz Soto	
8/11/2023	(France) Alix Collombon (Spain) Lorena Rufo	1–6 / 6–4 / 6–4	(Spain) Claudia Fernandez (Spain) Victoria Iglesias	
8/11/2023	(Spain) Marina Martínez (Spain) Sofía Saiz	7–5 / 4–6 / 7–5	(Italy) Carolina Orsi (Spain) Carla Mesa	
8/11/2023	(Spain) Majo Sánchez Alayeto (Spain) Mapi Sánchez Alayeto	6–4 / 5–7 / 6–4	(Spain) Agueda Perez (Spain) Patricia Martínez	
8/11/2023	(Argentina) Aranza Osoro (Spain) Jessica Castelló	6–4 / 6–1	(Spain) Nuria Rodriguez (Spain) Marta Talaván	
8/11/2023	(Spain) Lucía Sainz (Spain) Patty Llaguno	7–6 / 6–3	(Spain) Ariadna Cañellas (Spain) Noemi Aguilar	
8/11/2023	(Portugal) Ana Catarina Nogueira (Spain) Beatriz Caldera	7–5 / 7–6	(Spain) Marta Barrera (Spain) Melania Merino	

=== Round of 16 ===
Men's

Date	Winners	Score	Opponent	Refs.
9/11/2023	(Argentina) Agustín Tapia (Spain) Arturo Coello	6–4 / 7–5	(Spain) Javier Ruiz (Spain) Pablo Cardona	
9/11/2023	(Argentina) Agustín Gutiérrez (Argentina) Sanyo Gutiérrez	6–7 / 6–4 / 7–5	(Spain) Juan Martín Díaz (Argentina) Miguel Lamperti	
9/11/2023	(Spain) Alejandro Arroyo (Spain) Eduardo Alonso	6–2 / 6–3	(Spain) Alex Ruiz (Argentina) Juan Tello	
9/11/2023	(Spain) Alejandro Galán (Spain) Juan Lebrón	6–2 / 4–6 / 6–2	(Spain) Miguel Yanguas (Spain) Pablo Garcia Rodrigo	
9/11/2023	(Spain) Juanlu Esbri (Brazil) Lucas Campagnolo	6–2 / 6–1	(Spain) Jose Rico (Spain) Miguel Benitez	
9/11/2023	(Brazil) Lucas Bergamini (Spain) Víctor Ruiz	6–3 / 6–3	(Spain) Jairo Bautista (Spain) Jaime Muñoz	
9/11/2023	(Spain) Javi Garrido (Spain) Momo González	7–6 / 5–7 / 6–3	(Spain) Javier García Mora (Spain) Javier Gonzalez Barahona	
9/11/2023	(Argentina) Franco Stupaczuk (Argentina) Martin Di Nenno	6–1 / 6–1	(Spain) Antón Sans (Spain) David Gala Sanchez	

Women's

Date	Winners	Score	Opponent	Refs.
9/11/2023	(Spain) Ariana Sánchez (Spain) Paula Josemaria	6–3 / 6–0	(Spain) Ana Fernandez de Ossó (Spain) Mari Carmen Villalba	
9/11/2023	(Argentina) Claudia Jensen (Spain) Verónica Virseda	6–2 / 6–1	(Sweden) Carolina Navarro (Spain) Marina Guinart	
9/11/2023	(Spain) Tamara Icardo (Argentina) Virginia Riera	6–3 / 6–3	(Spain) Lara Arruabarrena (Spain) Marta Arellano	
9/11/2023	(Spain) Alejandra Salazar (Portugal) Sofia Araújo	6–1 / 6–2	(Spain) Alejandra Alonso (Spain) Andrea Ustero	
9/11/2023	(Spain) Bea González (Argentina) Delfina Brea	6–3 / 6–2	(France) Alix Collombon (Spain) Lorena Rufo	
9/11/2023	(Spain) Majo Sánchez Alayeto (Spain) Mapi Sánchez Alayeto	6–3 / 6–3	(Spain) Marina Martínez (Spain) Sofía Saiz	
9/11/2023	(Spain) Lucía Sainz (Spain) Patty Llaguno	3–6 / 6–1 / 7–6	(Argentina) Aranza Osoro (Spain) Jessica Castelló	
9/11/2023	(Spain) Gemma Triay (Spain) Marta Ortega	6–2 / 6–0	(Portugal) Ana Catarina Nogueira (Spain) Beatriz Caldera	

=== Quarter-Finals ===
Men's

Date	Winners	Score	Opponent	Refs.
10/11/2023	(Argentina) Agustín Tapia (Spain) Arturo Coello	4–6 / 6–4 / 6–1	(Argentina) Agustín Gutiérrez (Argentina) Sanyo Gutiérrez	
10/11/2023	(Spain) Alejandro Galán (Spain) Juan Lebrón	6–4 / 6–3	(Spain) Alejandro Arroyo (Spain) Eduardo Alonso	
10/11/2023	(Brazil) Lucas Bergamini (Spain) Víctor Ruiz	6–3 / 7–5	(Spain) Juanlu Esbri (Brazil) Lucas Campagnolo	
10/11/2023	(Argentina) Franco Stupaczuk (Argentina) Martin Di Nenno	7–6 / 6–0	(Spain) Javi Garrido (Spain) Momo González	

Women's

Date	Winners	Score	Opponent	Refs.
10/11/2023	(Spain) Ariana Sánchez (Spain) Paula Josemaria	6–4 / 6–3	(Argentina) Claudia Jensen (Spain) Verónica Virseda	
10/11/2023	(Spain) Alejandra Salazar (Portugal) Sofia Araújo	6–4 / 6–4	(Spain) Tamara Icardo (Argentina) Virginia Riera	
10/11/2023	(Spain) Bea González (Argentina) Delfina Brea	6–3 / 6–2	(Spain) Majo Sánchez Alayeto (Spain) Mapi Sánchez Alayeto	
10/11/2023	(Spain) Gemma Triay (Spain) Marta Ortega	4–6 / 6–1 / 6–0	(Spain) Lucía Sainz (Spain) Patty Llaguno	

=== Semi-Finals ===
Men's

Date	Winners	Score	Opponent	Refs.
11/11/2023	(Spain) Alejandro Galán (Spain) Juan Lebrón	6–2 / 6–1	(Argentina) Agustín Tapia (Spain) Arturo Coello	
11/11/2023	(Argentina) Franco Stupaczuk (Argentina) Martin Di Nenno	6–2 / 6–7 / 6–1	(Brazil) Lucas Bergamini (Spain) Víctor Ruiz	

Women's

Date	Winners	Score	Opponent	Refs.
11/11/2023	(Spain) Alejandra Salazar (Portugal) Sofia Araújo	6–2 / 6–2	(Spain) Ariana Sánchez (Spain) Paula Josemaria	
11/11/2023	(Spain) Bea González (Argentina) Delfina Brea	6–2 / 6–3	(Spain) Gemma Triay (Spain) Marta Ortega	

=== Finals ===
Men's

Date	Winners	Score	Opponent	Refs.
12/11/2023	(Spain) Alejandro Galán (Spain) Juan Lebrón	6–3 / 6–4	(Argentina) Franco Stupaczuk (Argentina) Martin Di Nenno	

Women's

Date	Winners	Score	Opponent	Refs.
12/11/2023	(Spain) Bea González (Argentina) Delfina Brea	6–4 / 6–3	(Spain) Alejandra Salazar (Portugal) Sofia Araújo	
