= 2022 Madrid P1 =

Padel championships

- Date: 1 – 6 August
- Edition: 1st
- Category: P1
- Prize money: € 525,000
- Location: Madrid, Spain
- Venue: WiZink Center

Champions
- Men's doubles: (Spain) Alejandro Galán (Spain) Juan Lebrón

Chronology
Previous
Málaga Open (WPT)
Next
2022 Argentina P1

The 2022 Madrid P1 was the fourth tournament of the season organized by Premier Padel, promoted by the International Padel Federation, and with the financial backing of Nasser Al-Khelaïfi's Qatar Sports Investments.

Alejandro Galán and Juan Lebrón, FIP number 1 ranked team, defeated Martin Di Nenno and Paquito Navarro, FIP number 2 ranked team, in the final, winning their third consecutive title in the circuit.

== Seeds ==
1. (Spain) Alejandro Galán / (Spain) Juan Lebrón (winners)
2. (Argentina) Martin Di Nenno / (Spain) Paquito Navarro (final)
3. (Argentina) Agustín Tapia / (Argentina) Sanyo Gutiérrez (semi-finals)
4. (Argentina) Franco Stupaczuk / (Brazil) Pablo Lima (semi-finals)
5. (Argentina) Federico Chingotto / (Argentina) Juan Tello (quarter-finals)
6. (Spain) Arturo Coello / (Argentina) Fernando Belasteguín (quarter-finals)
7. (Spain) Aléx Ruiz / (Spain) Jerónimo González (quarter-finals)
8. (Argentina) Lucho Capra/ (Argentina) Maxi Sanchéz (quarter-finals)

== Results ==
Round of 32
1	(Spain) Galán / (Spain) Lebrón	6	6
(Spain) D. Bressel / (Spain) P. Castillo	1	0
(Spain) I. Vilariño / (Spain) J. Muñoz	0	6	2
(Argentina) J.C. Belluati / (Argentina) R. Moyano	6	3	6
(Spain) J. Ruiz / (Spain) P. Lijó	6	2	*
(Spain) J.G. Mora / (Spain) R. Durán	1	2
(Spain) M. Quilez / (Spain) T. Bueno	5	3
5	(Argentina) Chingotto / (Argentina) Tello	7	6
6	(Argentina) Belasteguín / (Spain) Coello	6	6
(Spain) C. Fuster / (Spain) M. Solbes	4	2
(Argentina) I. Piotto / (Argentina) R. Pereyra	6	6
(Spain) Coki / (Spain) Yanguas	1	2
(Spain) J. Leal / (Spain) J. Rico	5	5
(Spain) A. Luque / (Spain) S. Icardo	7	7
(Spain) A. Ayats / (Argentina) D. Perino	2	3
3	(Argentina) Tapia / (Argentina) Sanyo	6	6
4	(Argentina) F. Stupaczuk / (Brazil) Lima	6	6
(Argentina) A. Patiniotis / (Spain) R. Rivera	0	1
(Spain) I. Ramírez / (Spain) M. Semmler	6	1	2
(Brazil) L. Campagnolo / (Spain) J. Garrido	3	6	6
(Argentina) A. Gutiérrez / (Spain) J. Rico	1	6	7
(Spain) J.G. Diestro / (Spain) P. Fernandéz	6	3	5
(Brazil) L. Bergamini / (Spain) V. Ruiz	5	1
7	(Spain) A. Ruíz / (Spain) Momo	7	6
8	(Argentina) L. Capra / (Argentina) Maxi	6	6
(Spain) G. Rubio / (Spain) M. Benítez	0	4
(Spain) E. Alonso / (Spain) J. Ruiz	2	3
(Spain) A. Arroyo / (Spain) J. Sanz	6	6
(Spain) F. Gil / (Argentina) R. Moyano	7	6
(Spain) A. Cépero / (Spain) C. Rocafort	5	0
(Spain) A. Santana / (Argentina) N. Suescun	0	1
2	(Argentina) Di Nenno / (Spain) Paquito	6	6

Round of 16
1	(Spain) Galán / (Spain) Lebrón	6	6
(Argentina) J.C. Belluati / (Argentina) R. Moyano	1	2
(Spain) J. Ruiz / (Spain) P. Lijó	4	7	3
5	(Argentina) Chingotto / (Argentina) J. Tello	6	5	6
5	(Argentina) Belasteguín / (Spain) Coello	6	5	*
(Spain) Coki / (Spain) Yanguas	2	2
(Spain) A. Luque / (Spain) S. Icardo	4	4
6	(Argentina) Tapia / (Argentina) Sanyo	6	6
4	(Argentina) F. Stupaczuk / (Brazil) Lima	6	6
(Brazil) L. Campagnolo / (Spain) J. Garrido	1	3
(Argentina) A. Gutiérrez / (Spain) J. Rico	2	4
7	(Spain) A. Ruíz / (Spain) Momo	6	6
8	(Argentina) L. Capra / (Argentina) Maxi	6	7
(Spain) A. Arroyo / (Spain) J. Sanz	1	6
(Spain) F. Gil / (Argentina) R. Moyano	3	4
2	(Argentina) Di Nenno / (Spain) Paquito	6	6

Quarterfinals
1	(Spain) Galán / (Spain) Lebrón	2	6	6
5	(Argentina) Chingotto / (Argentina) J. Tello	6	4	4
6	(Argentina) Belasteguín / (Spain) Coello	4	6
3	(Argentina) Tapia / (Argentina) Sanyo	6	7
4	(Argentina) F. Stupaczuk / (Brazil) Lima	6	3	6
7	(Spain) A. Ruíz / (Spain) Momo	1	6	1
8	(Argentina) L. Capra / (Argentina) Maxi	3	4
2	(Argentina) Di Nenno / (Spain) Paquito	6	6

Semifinals
1	(Spain) Galán / (Spain) Lebrón	3	6	7
3	(Argentina) Tapia / (Argentina) Sanyo	6	3	5
4	(Argentina) F. Stupaczuk / (Brazil) Lima	3	4
2	(Argentina) Di Nenno / (Spain) Paquito	6	6

Final
1	(Spain) Galán / (Spain) Lebrón	5	6	6
4	(Argentina) Di Nenno / (Spain) Paquito	7	2	3

=== First Round ===
Date	Winners	Score	Opponent	Refs.
1/8/2022	(Spain) Daniel Bressel (Spain) Pablo Castillo	7–6 / 7–5	(Argentina) Matías Nicoletti (Spain) Mario Ortega	
1/8/2022	(Spain) Jaime Muñoz (Spain) Ignacio Vilariño	6–3 / 6–2	(Brazil) Chico Gomes (Spain) Mario Huete	
1/8/2022	(Spain) Javier García Mora (Spain) Raúl Marcos Durán	6–3 / 6–2	(Spain) Fran Ramirez (Spain) Jairo Batista	
1/8/2022	(Spain) Marc Quilez (Spain) Toni Bueno	6–2 / 2–6 / 7–5	(Spain) Javier Gonzalez Barahona/ (Spain) Juanlu Esbri	
1/8/2022	(Spain) Christian Fuster (Spain) Miguel Solbes	6–7 / 6–3 6–2	(Spain) Adrian Ronco (Spain) Jaime Menendez	
1/8/2022	(Argentina) Ignacio Piotto (Argentina) Ramiro Pereyra	7–6 / 6–4	(Argentina) Fernando Poggi (Spain) Iñigo Jofre	
1/8/2022	(Spain) Antonio Luque (Spain) Sergio Icardo	6–2 / 4–6 / 7–6	(Spain) Jaime Fermosell (Spain) Javier Martinez	
1/8/2022	(Spain) Arnau Ayats (Argentina) Denis Perino	7–6 / 6–4	(Argentina) Cristian German Gutiérrez (Sweden) Daniel Windahl	
1/8/2022	(Argentina) Aris Patiniotis (Spain) Ruben Rivera	6–1 / 6–2	(Spain) Alvaro Melendez (Spain) Jose Solano Marmolejo	
1/8/2022	(Spain) Ivan Ramírez (Spain) Miguel Semmler	6–7 / 6–4 / 6–2	(Chile) Valdés (Spain) Jose David Sanchez Serrano	
1/8/2022	(Spain) José García Diestro (Spain) Pincho Fernandéz	6–4 / 6–2	(France) Benjamin Tison (Spain) Teodoro Zapata	
1/8/2022	(Brazil) Lucas Bergamini (Spain) Victor Ruiz	6–0 / 6–2	(Spain) Jesus Moya (Spain) Mario Del Castillo	
1/8/2022	(Spain) Gonzalo Rubio (Spain) Miguel Benítez	6–3 / 1–6 / 6–3	(Spain) Jose Maria Mouliaa (Spain) Pablo Cardona	
1/8/2022	(Spain) Eduardo Alonso (Spain) Jorge Ruiz	4–6 / 6–4 / 6–1	(Spain) Rafael Méndez (Spain) Salvador Oria	
1/8/2022	(Spain) Alvaro Cépero (Spain) Cayetano Rocafort	6–2 / 4–6 / 6–4	(Spain) Enrique Goenaga (Spain) Jairo Bautista	
1/8/2022	(Spain) Aday Santana (Argentina) Nicolás Suescun	6–4 / 3–6 / 6–3	(Spain) Anton Sans (Spain) Sergio Alba	

=== Round of 32 ===
Date	Winners	Score	Opponent	Refs.
2/8/2022	(Spain) Alejandro Galán (Spain) Juan Lebrón	6–1 / 6–0	(Spain) Daniel Bressel (Spain) Pablo Castillo	
2/8/2022	(Argentina) Agustin Gomez Silingo (Argentina) Juan Cruz Belluati	6–0 / 3–6 / 6–2	(Spain) Jaime Muñoz (Spain) Ignacio Vilariño	
2/8/2022	(Spain) Javi Ruiz (Spain) Pablo Lijó	6–1 / 2–1 / W.O.	(Spain) Javier García Mora (Spain) Raúl Marcos Durán	
2/8/2022	(Argentina) Federico Chingotto (Argentina) Juan Ignacio Tello	7–5 / 6–3	(Spain) Marc Quilez (Spain) Toni Bueno	
2/8/2022	(Spain) Arturo Coello (Argentina) Fernando Belasteguín	6–4 / 6–2	(Spain) Christian Fuster (Spain) Miguel Solbes	
2/8/2022	(Spain) Coki Nieto (Spain) Miguel Yanguas	6–1 / 6–2	(Argentina) Ignacio Piotto (Argentina) Ramiro Pereyra	
2/8/2022	(Spain) Antonio Luque (Spain) Sergio Icardo	7–5 / 7–5	(Spain) Javi Leal (Spain) Javi Rico	
2/8/2022	(Argentina) Agustín Tapia (Argentina) Sanyo Gutiérrez	6–2 / 6–3	(Spain) Arnau Ayats (Argentina) Denis Perino	
2/8/2022	(Argentina) Franco Stupaczuk (Brazil) Pablo Lima	6–0 / 6–1	(Argentina) Aris Patiniotis (Spain) Ruben Rivera	
2/8/2022	(Brazil) Lucas Campagnolo (Spain) Javi Garrido	3–6 / 6–1 / 6–2	(Spain) Ivan Ramírez (Spain) Miguel Semmler	
2/8/2022	(Argentina) Agustín Gutiérrez (Spain) José Rico	1–6 / 6–3 / 7–5	(Spain) José García Diestro (Spain) Pincho Fernandéz	
2/8/2022	(Spain) Alex Ruiz (Spain) Momo Gonzalez	7–5 / 6–1	(Brazil) Lucas Bergamini (Spain) Victor Ruiz	
2/8/2022	(Argentina) Lucho Capra (Argentina) Maxi Sánchez	6–0 / 6–4	(Spain) Gonzalo Rubio (Spain) Miguel Benítez	
2/8/2022	(Spain) Alejandro Arroyo (Spain) Jon Sanz	6–2 / 6–3	(Spain) Eduardo Alonso (Spain) Jorge Ruiz	
2/8/2022	(Spain) Francisco Gil Morales (Argentina) Ramiro Moyano	7–5 / 6–0	(Spain) Alvaro Cépero (Spain) Cayetano Rocafort	
2/8/2022	(Argentina) Martin Di Nenno (Spain) Paquito Navarro	6–1 / 6–4	(Spain) Aday Santana (Argentina) Nicolás Suescun	

=== Round of 16 ===
Date	Winners	Score	Opponent	Refs.
3/8/2022	(Spain) Alejandro Galán (Spain) Juan Lebrón	6–1 / 6–2	(Argentina) Agustin Gomez Silingo (Argentina) Juan Cruz Belluati	
3/8/2022	(Argentina) Federico Chingotto (Argentina) Juan Ignacio Tello	6–4 / 5–7 / 6–3	(Spain) Javi Ruiz (Spain) Pablo Lijó	
3/8/2022	(Spain) Arturo Coello (Argentina) Fernando Belasteguín	6–2 / 5–2 / W.O.	(Spain) Coki Nieto (Spain) Miguel Yanguas	
3/8/2022	(Argentina) Agustín Tapia (Argentina) Sanyo Gutiérrez	6–4 / 6–4	(Spain) Antonio Luque (Spain) Sergio Icardo	
3/8/2022	(Argentina) Franco Stupaczuk (Brazil) Pablo Lima	6–1 / 6–3	(Brazil) Lucas Campagnolo (Spain) Javi Garrido	
3/8/2022	(Spain) Alex Ruiz (Spain) Momo Gonzalez	6–2 / 6–4	(Argentina) Agustín Gutiérrez (Spain) José Rico	
3/8/2022	(Argentina) Lucho Capra (Argentina) Maxi Sánchez	6–1 / 7–6	(Spain) Alejandro Arroyo (Spain) Jon Sanz	
3/8/2022	(Argentina) Martin Di Nenno (Spain) Paquito Navarro	6–3 / 6–4	(Spain) Francisco Gil Morales (Argentina) Ramiro Moyano	

=== Quarter-Finals ===
Date	Winners	Score	Opponent	Refs.
4/8/2022	(Spain) Alejandro Galán (Spain) Juan Lebrón	2–6 / 6–4 / 6–4	(Argentina) Federico Chingotto (Argentina) Juan Ignacio Tello	
4/8/2022	(Argentina) Agustín Tapia (Argentina) Sanyo Gutiérrez	6–4 / 7–6	(Spain) Arturo Coello (Argentina) Fernando Belasteguín	
4/8/2022	(Argentina) Franco Stupaczuk (Brazil) Pablo Lima	6–1 / 3–6 / 6–1	(Spain) Alex Ruiz (Spain) Momo Gonzalez	
4/8/2022	(Argentina) Martin Di Nenno (Spain) Paquito Navarro	6–3 / 6–4	(Argentina) Lucho Capra (Argentina) Maxi Sánchez	

=== Semi-Finals ===
Date	Winners	Score	Opponent	Refs.
5/8/2022	(Spain) Alejandro Galán (Spain) Juan Lebrón	3–6 / 6–3 / 7–5	(Argentina) Agustín Tapia (Argentina) Sanyo Gutiérrez	
5/8/2022	(Argentina) Martin Di Nenno (Spain) Paquito Navarro	6–3 / 6–4	(Argentina) Franco Stupaczuk (Brazil) Pablo Lima	

=== Finals ===
Date	Winners	Score	Opponent	Refs.
6/8/2022	(Spain) Alejandro Galán (Spain) Juan Lebrón	5–7 / 6–2 / 6–3	(Argentina) Martin Di Nenno (Spain) Paquito Navarro	

== Points and prize money ==
=== Points and money distribution ===
Below is a series of tables showing the ranking points and money a player can earn.

Event	First round	Second Round	Round of 16	QF	SF	F	W
Points	18	45	90	180	300	600	1000
