= Alejandro Galán Romo =

Spanish padel player

Alejandro Galán
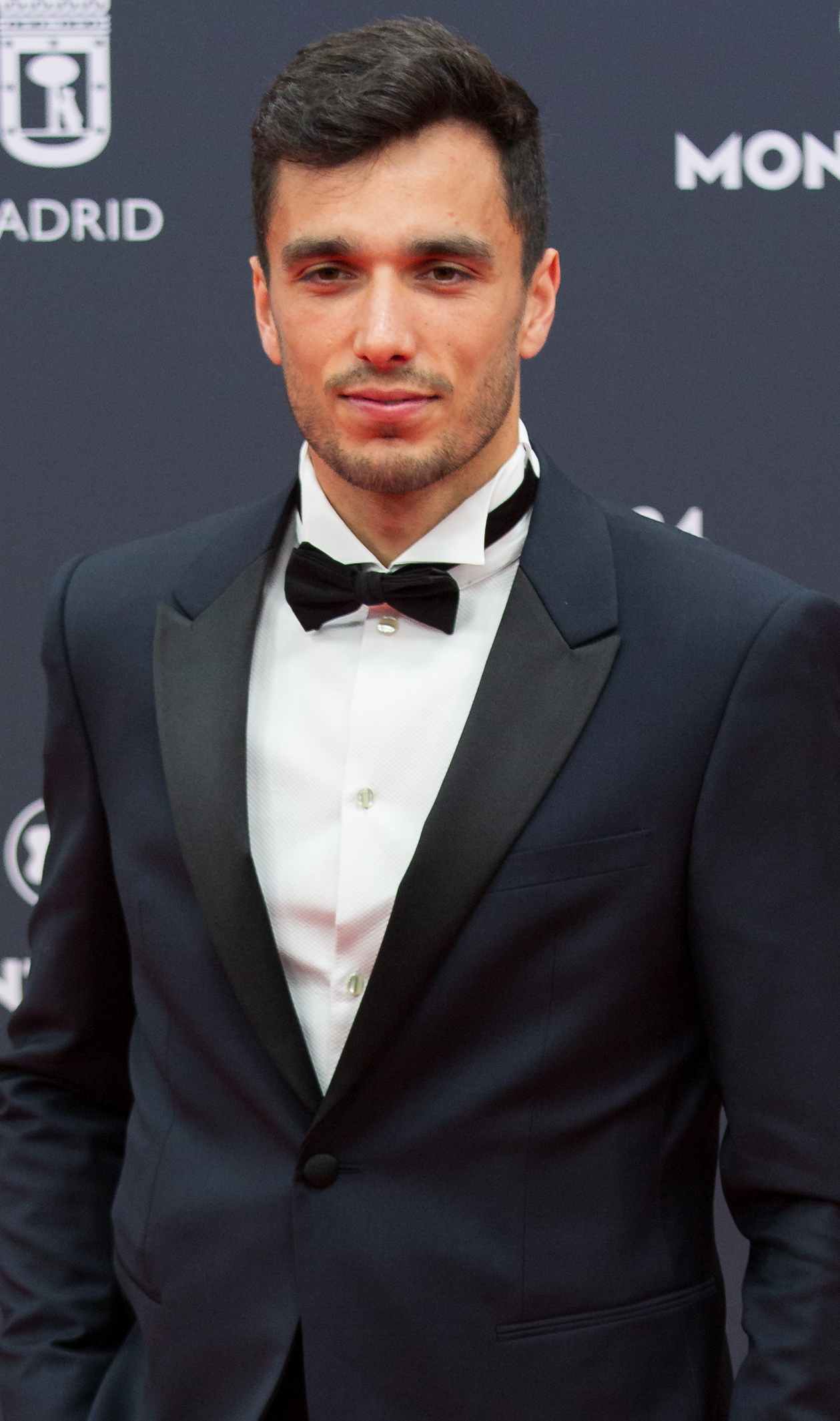

Personal information
- Full name: Alejandro Galán Romo
- Nicknames: Galántico; El Monstruo de Leganés; El Alien
- Born: May 15, 1996 (age 30) Madrid, Spain
- Height: 1.86 m (6 ft 1 in)

Sport
- Country: Spain
- Sport: Padel
- Position: Revés (left-side)
- Rank: 3rd (PP)
- Turned pro: 2014 (WPT)
- Partner: Federico Chingotto

Achievements and titles
- Highest world ranking: 1st (2020, 2021, 2022)
- Updated on 22 August 2026

Alejandro Galán Romo (born 15 May 1996), known as Alejandro Galán, is a Spanish professional padel player who holds the 3rd position in the International Padel Federation (FIP) ranking. He currently plays on the backhand side alongside Federico Chingotto since 2024.

Galán was world number 1 alongside Juan Lebrón for three consecutive years (2020, 2021 and 2022), until in May of 2023 when they both lost that status to Agustín Tapia and Arturo Coello.

== Career ==
Alejandro Galán's sporting career in the World Padel Tour began after joining forces with Juan Cruz Belluati in 2016. Together they achieved good results from the beginning, and achieved their definitive breakthrough as a pair in 2017. Despite a great 2017, after the separation of the pair formed by Matías Díaz and Maxi Sánchez, Galán teamed with Matías for the 2018 World Padel Tour season, while Belluati decided to team up with Juan Lebrón.

=== Breakthrough year ===
==== 2018 ====
Díaz and Galán started the season reaching the semi-finals of their first three tournaments together, but their best result would come in the Valladolid Open, where they defeated Maxi Sánchez & Sanyo Gutiérrez in three sets, with Galán claiming its first trophy.

Five tournaments later, after four consecutive semi-finals losses, in the Lugo Open, they repeated their triumph, beating Lucho Capra & Ramiro Moyano, 6–0 and 6–4 in the final.

In the last five tournaments of the regular season they weren't unable to progress to the finals, reaching the quarter-finals twice. They finished the year competing in the annual Master Final, but lost in the semi-finals to the number one ranked team of Maxi Sánchez & Sanyo Gutiérrez.

=== Consolidation among the padel elite ===
==== 2019 ====
In 2019, the season began alongside Juani Mieres. In their first five tournaments as team they only reached the semi-finals once, but on the sixth tournament of the year, the Buenos Aires Master, they reached the finals against the number two ranked team Fernando Belasteguín & Pablo Lima, winning the tournament due to a Belasteguin injury which forced their rivals to withdraw. They reached the finals of the next tournament, but lost against Juan Lebrón & Paquito Navarro. In their last tournament together, Galán and Mieres reached the semi-finals of the Swedish Open.

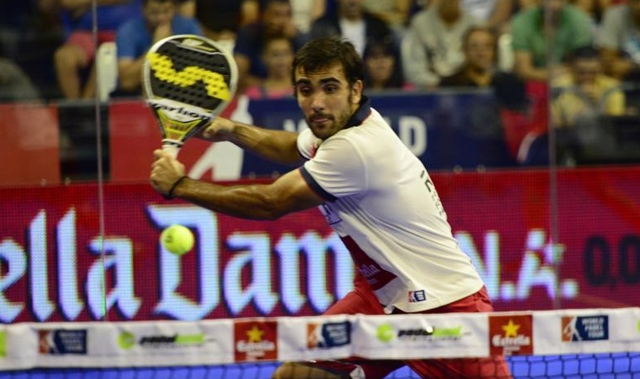
Pablo Lima, who Galán played with in second half of the 2019 World Padel Tour season.

Mid-season, with nine tournaments played and another nine remaining, Galán teamed with Pablo Lima. They debuted in the Valencia Open, reaching the final and winning the tournament. They also won the next tournament, the Mijas Open. Their first loss came against in the Madrid Master quarter-finals, but they bounced back winning the Portugal Master, their third tournament title in four disputed.

In the last four tournaments they're best result were two semi-finals, in the São Paulo Open, in Lima's home country, and in Mexico. In the Master Final, World Padel Tour end of season tournament, they defeated Augustín Tapia & Fernando Belasteguín in the final, winning their fourth tournament of the season. Together they finished as the second ranked team in the circuit, with Galán finishing third individually in ranking.

Despite winning four of the nine tournaments they played together, Galán and Lima opted to part ways, with Juan Lebrón becoming Galán's new partner.

=== Partnership with Juan Lebrón ===
==== 2020 ====
Galán and Lebrón started the new season facing their former partners, Pablo Lima & Paquito Navarro, in the final of the Marbella Master and losing in three sets. Three months later, after the return from the Covid-19 stoppage, they avenged their loss in the previous tournaments, winning the Estrella Damm Open. They followed their triumph winning the Vuelve a Madrid, Adeslas, and Valencia Open's.

In the next two tournament, Galán and Lebrón would be eliminated in the semi-finals, by Javier Ruiz & Uri Botello in the Sardegna Open, and Franco Stupaczuk & Sanyo Gutiérrez in the Menorca Open. They bounced back by winning the Barcelona Master and the Alicante Open.

After being knocked out in the semi-finals of the Las Rozas Open, with the number one ranking spot already locked, the Spanish pair competed in the Master Final, where they reached the finals to face Agustín Tapia & Fernando Belasteguín, losing 6–3 and 7–6.

==== 2021 ====
Galán and Lebrón started 2021 reaching the quarter finals of the Madrid Open, where they lost to in three sets to Alex Ruiz & Franco Stupaczuk. They avenged their loss in the final of the next tournament, winning the Alicante Open. In the next tournament they were eliminated in the semi-finals against Martín Di Nenno & Paquito Navarro, which would be their main rivals in the season.

The Spanish pair reacted winning the next two tournaments, in Santander and Marbella. After an elimination in the Valladolid Master semi-finals, they faced then second ranked pair Fernando Belasteguín & Sanyo Gutiérrez in the final of the Valencia Open, losing in three sets. Having failed to reach the finals in the two previous tournaments, they returned from the summer break in the Portugal Master, reaching the finals and winning.

In the last eight tournament remaining they reached only two finals, in Lugo and Menorca, winning both of them but leaving the ranking race open. Because of their setbacks, along with the strong results of Di Nenno & Paquito, Galán and Lebrón arrived at the Master Final, WPT last tournament of the season, needing to outperform their rivals to retain the number 1 ranking. Something they would manage to, with Di Nenno and Paquito elimination in the semis by Agustín Tapia & Sanyo Gutiérrez, whom they next defeated in the finals.

==== 2022 ====
In their third season together, Galán and Lebrón started 2022 with an early exit in the Miami Open. The result was followed by three tournament finals losses, the first against the third ranked pair Agustín Tapia & Sanyo Gutiérrez in the Reus Open, followed by two losses against the second ranked team Martín Di Nenno & Paquito Navarro in the Vigo Open, and the Qatar Major, Premier Padel's first tournament ever.

They reacted winning the Alicante and Brussels Open's. A quarter-final loss in Denmark did not affect as they won the Premier's Padel Italy Major and the Marbella Master. In the next four World Padel Tour tournaments, despite reaching the finals in all of them, they could only win the Valladolid Master, losing in Austria, France, and Valencia, but still won the Paris Major in Premier Padel.

An early exit in the Málaga Open, the last WPT tournament before the summer break, was followed by a title win in the Madrid P1. After returning to WPT competition, they won five out eight tournaments, including the Portugal Open, the Swedish Open, the Menorca Open, the Malmö Open and the Buenos Aires Master.

Lebrón and Galán finished the year winning the Master Final and the Milan P1, finishing the year comfortably in first ranking spot.

==== 2023 ====
In 2023, they had a rought start reaching only two finals in the first seven tournaments, the first one a Premier Padel comepetion. The two finals losses came against Agustín Tapia & Arturo Coello who had won the six WPT tournaments, which made the Vigo Open final between Galán & Lebrón and Coello & Tapia a battle for the number one spot, which the latter won.

During the Danish Open 1000 they had to withdraw due to a Lebrón injury, which would sideline him for the next two months, missing five tournaments. In the meantime Galán played with Jon Sanz reaching the finals of the Valencia Open. After Lebrón return from injury, Galán and Lebrón won four out seven tournaments, including the Finland, Germany, Menorca, and Malmö Open's.

In the last two tournament of the year, they won the Milan P1 against Franco Stupaczuk & Martín Di Nenno, but lost the Barcelona Master Final, where they reached the finals against Fede Chingotto & Paquito Navarro. in the final tournament of the circuit.

==== 2024 ====
In 2024, now with Premier Padel as the main circuit, Galán and Lebrón started the year defeating Coello & Tapia to in three sets at the finals of the Riyadh P1. In the next tournament they had an early exit against Javi Garrido & Mike Yanguas, in a controversial game that led Galán to decide to separate from Lebrón. They played their last tournament together in the Acapulco P1, losing in the finals against Agustín Tapia & Arturo Coello.

=== Partnership with Federico Chingotto ===
After separating from Lebrón, Galán choose Federico Chingotto as his new partner. They debuted in the Puerto Cabello P2, where they reached the finals, but lost against Coello & Tapia. They improved their results in the next two tournaments, avenging their previous loss in the Brussels P2, and defeating Franco Stupaczuk and Martín Di Nenno in the Seville P2 finals.

Leading up to the summer break, they faced Coello & Tapia in six more finals, winning in Mar del Plata, Rome, and Genoa, but losing in Asunción, Santiago, and Málaga. In the Genoa semifinal, Galán faced Juan Lebrón for the first time since their split, winning the match.

After returning from the summer break, the balance seen in head-to-head matchups against their rivals vanished, with Galán and Chingotto losing five consecutive finals, in Madrid, Rotterdam, Valladolid, Paris, and Dubai, to Coello & Tapia. Their streak of 14 consecutive finals came to an end in Kuwait, where they were eliminated by Franco Stupaczuk & Mike Yanguas in the semifinals, missing out on a final for the first time, a scenario that would repeat at the following tournament in Mexico.

Chingotto and Galán would finish the season with another loss to Coello & Tapia in the Milan final, and a quarterfinal exit at the Premier Padel Finals.

==== 2025 ====
Galán and Chingotto began 2025 with a quarter-final exit against Leandro Augsburger & Pablo Cardona in the Riyadh P1. They bounced back winning the Miami and the Santiago P1's, both against Franco Stupaczuk & Juan Lebrón, and ending a 259-day drought without lifting a trophy. The first two matchups against Coello & Tapia would come in the finals of the Qatar Major and the Brussels P2, both of which they lost. They would capitaliz on their rivals' slip to win the Asunción P2, avenging their defeat in the Riyadh final.

After having to withdraw from the Buenos Aires P1, Chingotto and Galán defeated the number one ranked pair in the finals of the Italy Major, ending a losing streak against Coello & Tapia that had spanned nine consecutive finals and 343 days without a win over against them. However this would be their last win over their rivals before the summer break, losing the Bordeaux, Málaga, and Tarragona finals against them.

After the summer break, Chingotto and Galán were eliminated in the quarterfinals of the Madrid P1 and lost to their rivals again at the Paris Major and Rotterdam P1. However, victories over Coello and Tapia in Germany, Milan, and at the FIP Pairs World Cup, along with winning the Giza P1, brought them closer to the top spot in the rankings.

However, consecutive defeats in the Dubai P1 and Mexico Major finals against Coello & Tapia would end any mathematical chance for Galán and Chingotto to finish the season as the world's number one pair. On December 14, Galán and Chingotto faced Agustín Tapia & Arturo Coello in the Premier Padel Finals, losing to their rivals in three sets.

== Honours ==
=== World Padel Tour (2013–2023) ===
Winner Runner-up

==== Finals ====
| N.º | Date | Tournament | Partner | Result | Opponents in the final | Career title No. |
2017
| 1. | 18 May 2017 | (Spain) Joma Madrid Challenger | (Argentina) Juan Cruz Belluati | 6–4 / 6–2 | (Spain) Godo Díaz (Argentina) Lucho Capra | |
2018
| 2. | 24 June 2018 | (Spain) Valladolid Open | (Spain) Matías Díaz | 7–5 / 3–6 / 6–3 | (Argentina) Maxi Sánchez (Argentina) Sanyo Gutiérrez | 1st |
| 3. | 9 September 2018 | (Spain) Lugo Open | (Spain) Matías Díaz | 6–0 / 6–4 | (Argentina) Lucho Capra (Argentina) Ramiro Moyano | 2nd |
2019
| 4. | 9 June 2019 | Argentina Master | (Spain) Juani Mieres | WO | (Argentina) Fernando Belasteguín (Brazil) Pablo Lima | 3rd |
| 5. | 23 June 2019 | (Spain) Valladolid Master | (Spain) Juani Mieres | 7–6 / 4–6 / 4–6 | (Spain) Juan Lebrón (Spain) Paquito Navarro | |
| 6. | 14 July 2019 | (Spain) Valencia Open | (Brazil) Pablo Lima | 6–7 / 7–5 / 6–3 | (Argentina) Adrián Allemandi (Argentina) Agustín Gómez Silingo | 4th |
| 7. | 11 August 2019 | (Spain) Mijas Open | (Brazil) Pablo Lima | 7–6 / 6–4 | (Spain) Coki Nieto (Spain) Javier Rico | 5th |
| 8. | 22 September 2019 | Portugal Master | (Brazil) Pablo Lima | 6–4 / 6–4 | (Argentina) Federico Chingotto (Argentina) Juan Tello | 6th |
| 9. | 22 December 2019 | (Spain) Master Final | (Brazil) Pablo Lima | 7–6 / 6–3 | (Argentina) Agustín Tapia (Argentina) Fernando Belasteguín | 7th |
2020
| 10. | 8 March 2020 | (Spain) Marbella Master | (Spain) Juan Lebrón | 6–7 / 6–2 / 3–6 | (Brazil) Pablo Lima (Spain) Paquito Navarro | |
| 11. | 5 July 2020 | (Spain) Estrella Damm Open | (Spain) Juan Lebrón | 7–5 / 6–3 | (Brazil) Pablo Lima (Spain) Paquito Navarro | 8th |
| 12. | 19 July 2020 | (Spain) Vuelve a Madrid Open | (Spain) Juan Lebrón | 4–6 / 6–1 / 6–4 | (Argentina) Agustín Tapia (Argentina) Fernando Belasteguín | 9th |
| 13. | 9 August 2020 | (Spain) Adeslas Open | (Spain) Juan Lebrón | 6–7 / 6–1 / 6–4 | (Argentina) Federico Chingotto (Argentina) Juan Tello | 10th |
| 14. | 6 September 2020 | (Spain) Valencia Open | (Spain) Juan Lebrón | 6–3 / 7–6 | (Argentina) Federico Chingotto (Argentina) Juan Tello | 11th |
| 15. | 18 October 2020 | (Spain) Barcelona Master | (Spain) Juan Lebrón | 6–4 / 6–1 | (Argentina) Franco Stupaczuk (Argentina) Sanyo Gutiérrez | 12th |
| 16. | 8 November 2020 | (Spain) Alicante Open | (Spain) Juan Lebrón | 4–6 / 6–3 / 6–4 | (Argentina) Franco Stupaczuk (Argentina) Sanyo Gutiérrez | 13th |
| 17. | 13 December 2020 | (Spain) Master Final | (Spain) Juan Lebrón | 3–6 / 6–7 | (Argentina) Agustín Tapia (Argentina) Fernando Belasteguín | |
2021
| 18. | 25 April 2021 | (Spain) Alicante Open | (Spain) Juan Lebrón | 6–0 / 6–4 | (Spain) Alejandro Ruiz (Argentina) Franco Stupaczuk | 14th |
| 19. | 30 May 2021 | (Spain) Santander Open | (Spain) Juan Lebrón | 6–3 / 6–2 | (Spain) Javi Rico (Spain) Momo González | 15th |
| 20. | 13 June 2021 | (Spain) Marbella Master | (Spain) Juan Lebrón | 7–6 / 6–2 | (Argentina) Agustín Tapia (Brazil) Pablo Lima | 16th |
| 21. | 11 July 2021 | (Spain) Valencia Open | (Spain) Juan Lebrón | 5–7 / 6–3 / 4–6 | (Argentina) Fernando Belasteguín (Argentina) Sanyo Gutiérrez | |
| 22. | 5 September 2021 | Portugal Master | (Spain) Juan Lebrón | 4–6 / 7–5 / 6–3 | (Argentina) Federico Chingotto (Argentina) Juan Tello | 17th |
| 23. | 26 September 2021 | (Spain) Lugo Open | (Spain) Juan Lebrón | 6–4 / 4–6 / 6–3 | (Argentina) Martín Di Nenno (Spain) Paquito Navarro | 18th |
| 24. | 10 October 2021 | (Spain) Menorca Open | (Spain) Juan Lebrón | 6–3 / 6–4 | (Argentina) Martín Di Nenno (Spain) Paquito Navarro | 19th |
| 25. | 19 December 2021 | (Spain) Master Final | (Spain) Juan Lebrón | 6–4 / 6–4 | (Argentina) Agustín Tapia (Argentina) Sanyo Gutiérrez | 20th |
2022
| 26. | 13 March 2022 | (Spain) Reus Open | (Spain) Juan Lebrón | 2–6 / 2–6 | (Argentina) Agustín Tapia (Argentina) Sanyo Gutiérrez | |
| 27. | 27 March 2022 | (Spain) Vigo Open | (Spain) Juan Lebrón | 6–2 / 3–6 / 4–6 | (Argentina) Martín Di Nenno (Spain) Paquito Navarro | |
| 28. | 10 April 2022 | (Spain) Alicante Open | (Spain) Juan Lebrón | 6–2 / 6–3 | (Argentina) Martín Di Nenno (Spain) Paquito Navarro | 21st |
| 29. | 8 May 2022 | (Belgium) Brussels Open | (Spain) Juan Lebrón | 6–3 / 6–3 | (Argentina) Franco Stupaczuk (Brazil) Pablo Lima | 22nd |
| 30. | 5 June 2022 | (Spain) Marbella Master | (Spain) Juan Lebrón | 6–2 / 6–4 | (Spain) Alejandro Ruiz (Spain) Momo González | 23rd |
| 31. | 12 June 2022 | Austria Open | (Spain) Juan Lebrón | 1–6 / 6–0 / 6–7 | (Argentina) Agustín Tapia (Argentina) Sanyo Gutiérrez | |
| 32. | 19 June 2022 | (France) French Open | (Spain) Juan Lebrón | 6–7 / 4–6 | (Argentina) Franco Stupaczuk (Brazil) Pablo Lima | |
| 33. | 26 June 2022 | (Spain) Valladolid Master | (Spain) Juan Lebrón | 7–6 / 6–4 | (Spain) Arturo Coello (Argentina) Fernando Belasteguín | 24th |
| 34. | 10 July 2022 | (Spain) Valencia Open | (Spain) Juan Lebrón | 6–2 / 5–7 / 4–6 | (Argentina) Agustín Tapia (Argentina) Sanyo Gutiérrez | |
| 35. | 11 September 2022 | Portugal Open | (Spain) Juan Lebrón | 6–2 / 6–7 / 6–1 | (Argentina) Agustín Tapia (Argentina) Sanyo Gutiérrez | 25th |
| 36. | 18 September 2022 | (Sweden) Swedish Open | (Spain) Juan Lebrón | 6–7 / 6–2 / 6–1 | (Argentina) Martín Di Nenno (Spain) Paquito Navarro | 26th |
| 37. | 23 October 2022 | (Spain) Menorca Open | (Spain) Juan Lebrón | 6–4 / 4–6 / 6–2 | (Spain) Francisco Gil (Argentina) Ramiro Moyano | 27th |
| 38. | 13 November 2022 | (Sweden) Malmö Open | (Spain) Juan Lebrón | 4–6 / 6–1 / 6–2 | (Argentina) Agustín Tapia (Argentina) Sanyo Gutiérrez | 28th |
| 39. | 20 November 2022 | Argentina Master | (Spain) Juan Lebrón | 7–6 / 6–2 | (Spain) Arturo Coello (Argentina) Fernando Belasteguín | 29th |
| 40. | 18 December 2022 | (Spain) Master Final | (Spain) Juan Lebrón | 6–4 / 6–7 / 6–2 | (Argentina) Federico Chingotto (Argentina) Martín Di Nenno | 30th |
2023
| 41. | 26 February 2023 | (United Arab Emirates) Abu Dhabi Master | (Spain) Juan Lebrón | 6–7 / 3–6 | (Argentina) Agustín Tapia (Spain) Arturo Coello | |
| 42. | 19 March 2023 | (Chile) Santiago Open 1000 | (Spain) Juan Lebrón | 4–6 / 7–6 / 5–7 | (Argentina) Agustín Tapia (Spain) Arturo Coello | |
| 43. | 14 May 2023 | (Spain) Vigo Open 1000 | (Spain) Juan Lebrón | 3–6 / 7–6 / 6–7 | (Argentina) Agustín Tapia (Spain) Arturo Coello | |
| 44. | 9 July 2023 | (Spain) Valencia Open 1000 | (Spain) Jon Sanz | 3–6 / 3–6 | (Argentina) Franco Stupaczuk (Argentina) Martín Di Nenno | |
| 45. | 3 September 2023 | Finland Open 1000 | (Spain) Juan Lebrón | 6–0 / 7–6 | (Spain) Coki Nieto (Spain) Jon Sanz | 31st |
| 46. | 1 October 2023 | Germany Open 1000 | (Spain) Juan Lebrón | 6–2 / 6–2 | (Argentina) Martín Di Nenno (Argentina) Franco Stupaczuk | 32nd |
| 47. | 29 October 2023 | (Spain) Menorca Open 1000 | (Spain) Juan Lebrón | 6–3 / 6–2 | (Spain) Arturo Coello (Argentina) Agustín Tapia | 33rd |
| 48. | 12 November 2023 | (Sweden) Malmö Open 1000 | (Spain) Juan Lebrón | 6–3 / 6–4 | (Argentina) Franco Stupaczuk (Argentina) Martín Di Nenno | 34th |
| 49. | 12 December 2023 | (Spain) Masters Final | (Spain) Juan Lebrón | 1–6 / 4–6 | (Argentina) Federico Chingotto (Spain) Paquito Navarro | |

| Tournaments won | Challenger | Open | Master | Master Final | Total |
|---|---|---|---|---|---|
| Tournaments won | 0 | 23 | 8 | 3 | 34 |

=== Premier Padel (2022–Present) ===
Winner Runner-up

==== Finals ====
| N.º | Date | Tournament | Partner | Result | Opponents in the final | Career title No. |
2022
| 50. | 3 April 2022 | Qatar Major | (Spain) Juan Lebrón | 3–6 / 6–7 | (Argentina) Martín Di Nenno (Spain) Paquito Navarro | |
| 51. | 29 May 2022 | Italy Major | (Spain) Juan Lebrón | 6–3 / 4–6 / 6–4 | (Argentina) Martín Di Nenno (Spain) Paquito Navarro | 35th |
| 52. | 17 July 2022 | (France) Paris Major | (Spain) Juan Lebrón | 6–3 / 4–6 / 6–4 | (Argentina) Federico Chingotto (Argentina) Juan Tello | 36th |
| 53. | 7 August 2022 | (Spain) Madrid P1 | (Spain) Juan Lebrón | 5–7 / 6–2 / 6–3 | (Argentina) Martín Di Nenno (Spain) Paquito Navarro | 37th |
| 54. | 30 October 2022 | (Egypt) Giza P1 | (Spain) Juan Lebrón | 6–2 / 6–7 / 6–7 | (Argentina) Franco Stupaczuk (Brazil) Pablo Lima | |
| 55. | 11 December 2022 | (Italy) Milan P1 | (Spain) Juan Lebrón | 6–2 / 6–2 | (Brazil) Lucas Bergamini (Spain) Víctor Ruiz | 38th |
2023
| 56. | 10 December 2023 | (Italy) Milan P1 | (Spain) Juan Lebrón | 7–6 / 6–7 / 7–6 | (Argentina) Franco Stupaczuk (Argentina) Martín Di Nenno | 39th |
2024
| 57. | 2 March 2024 | (Saudi Arabia) Riyadh P1 | (Spain) Juan Lebrón | 6–7 / 6–4 / 6–4 | (Argentina) Agustín Tapia (Spain) Arturo Coello | 40th |
| 58. | 24 March 2024 | (Mexico) Acapulco P1 | (Spain) Juan Lebrón | 0–6 / 4–6 | (Argentina) Agustín Tapia (Spain) Arturo Coello | |
| 59. | 31 March 2024 | (Venezuela) Puerto Cabello P2 | (Argentina) Federico Chingotto | 6–2 / 3–6 / 3–6 | (Argentina) Agustín Tapia (Spain) Arturo Coello | |
| 60. | 28 April 2024 | (Belgium) Brussels P2 | (Argentina) Federico Chingotto | 6–4 / 6–7 / 6–2 | (Argentina) Agustín Tapia (Spain) Arturo Coello | 41st |
| 61. | 5 May 2024 | (Spain) Seville P2 | (Argentina) Federico Chingotto | 7–6 / 6–4 | (Argentina) Franco Stupaczuk (Argentina) Martín Di Nenno | 42nd |
| 62. | 19 May 2024 | (Paraguay) Asunción P2 | (Argentina) Federico Chingotto | 1–6 / 6–3 / 6–7 | (Argentina) Agustín Tapia (Spain) Arturo Coello | |
| 63. | 26 May 2024 | (Argentina) Mar de Plata P1 | (Argentina) Federico Chingotto | 2–6 / 6–2 / 6–2 | (Argentina) Agustín Tapia (Spain) Arturo Coello | 43rd |
| 64. | 3 June 2024 | (Chile) Santiago P1 | (Argentina) Federico Chingotto | 0–6 / 6–4 / 4–6 | (Argentina) Agustín Tapia (Spain) Arturo Coello | |
| 65. | 23 June 2024 | Italy Major | (Argentina) Federico Chingotto | 6–4 / 1–6 / 6–1 | (Argentina) Agustín Tapia (Spain) Arturo Coello | 44th |
| 66. | 7 July 2024 | (Italy) Genoa P2 | (Argentina) Federico Chingotto | 6–1 / 6–1 | (Argentina) Agustín Tapia (Spain) Arturo Coello | 45th |
| 67. | 14 July 2024 | (Spain) Málaga P1 | (Argentina) Federico Chingotto | 2–6 / 3–6 | (Argentina) Agustín Tapia (Spain) Arturo Coello | |
| 68. | 8 September 2024 | (Spain) Madrid P1 | (Argentina) Federico Chingotto | 3–6 / 6–7 | (Argentina) Agustín Tapia (Spain) Arturo Coello | |
| 69. | 15 September 2024 | (Netherlands) Rotterdam P1 | (Argentina) Federico Chingotto | 2–6 / 2–6 | (Argentina) Agustín Tapia (Spain) Arturo Coello | |
| 70. | 22 September 2024 | (Spain) Valladolid P2 | (Argentina) Federico Chingotto | 4–6 / 6–4 / 3–6 | (Argentina) Agustín Tapia (Spain) Arturo Coello | |
| 71. | 6 October 2024 | (France) Paris Major | (Argentina) Federico Chingotto | 2–6 / 1–6 | (Argentina) Agustín Tapia (Spain) Arturo Coello | |
| 72. | 10 November 2024 | (United Arab Emirates) Dubai P1 | (Argentina) Federico Chingotto | 4–6 / 3–6 | (Argentina) Agustín Tapia (Spain) Arturo Coello | |
| 73. | 8 December 2024 | (Italy) Milan P1 | (Argentina) Federico Chingotto | 4–6 / 5–7 | (Argentina) Agustín Tapia (Spain) Arturo Coello | |
2025
| 74. | 23 March 2025 | (United States) Miami P1 | (Argentina) Federico Chingotto | 6–1 / 7–6 | (Argentina) Franco Stupaczuk (Spain) Juan Lebrón | 46th |
| 75. | 31 March 2025 | (Chile) Santiago P1 | (Argentina) Federico Chingotto | W.O. | (Argentina) Franco Stupaczuk (Spain) Juan Lebrón | 47th |
| 76. | 19 April 2025 | Qatar Major | (Argentina) Federico Chingotto | 6–7 / 2–6 | (Argentina) Agustín Tapia (Spain) Arturo Coello | |
| 77. | 27 April 2025 | (Belgium) Brussels P2 | (Argentina) Federico Chingotto | 6–2 / 4–6 / 1–6 | (Argentina) Agustín Tapia (Spain) Arturo Coello | |
| 78. | 25 May 2025 | (Paraguay) Asunción P2 | (Argentina) Federico Chingotto | 7–6 / 6–1 | (Argentina) Leandro Augsburger (Spain) Pablo Cardona | 48th |
| 79. | 15 June 2025 | Italy Major | (Argentina) Federico Chingotto | 6–3 / 7–5 | (Argentina) Agustín Tapia (Spain) Arturo Coello | 49th |
| 80. | 6 July 2025 | (France) Bordeaux P2 | (Argentina) Federico Chingotto | 6–7 / 4–6 | (Argentina) Agustín Tapia (Spain) Arturo Coello | |
| 81. | 20 July 2025 | (Spain) Málaga P1 | (Argentina) Federico Chingotto | 4–6 / 5–7 | (Argentina) Agustín Tapia (Spain) Arturo Coello | |
| 82. | 3 August 2025 | (Spain) Tarragona P1 | (Argentina) Federico Chingotto | 6–7 / 5–7 | (Argentina) Agustín Tapia (Spain) Arturo Coello | |
| 83. | 7 September 2025 | (France) Paris Major | (Argentina) Federico Chingotto | 1–6 / 4–6 | (Argentina) Agustín Tapia (Spain) Arturo Coello | |
| 84. | 28 September 2025 | Germany P2 | (Argentina) Federico Chingotto | 7–6 / 6–2 | (Argentina) Agustín Tapia (Spain) Arturo Coello | 50th |
| 85. | 5 October 2025 | (Netherlands) Rotterdam P1 | (Argentina) Federico Chingotto | 3–6 / 6–7 | (Argentina) Agustín Tapia (Spain) Arturo Coello | |
| 86. | 12 October 2025 | (Italy) Milano P1 | (Argentina) Federico Chingotto | 2–6 / 6–3 / 6–0 | (Argentina) Agustín Tapia (Spain) Arturo Coello | 51st |
| 87. | 2 November 2025 | (Egypt) Giza P2 | (Argentina) Federico Chingotto | 6–1 / 6–2 | (Spain) Jon Sanz (Spain) Paquito Navarro | 52nd |
| 88. | 9 November 2025 | (Kuwait) FIP Pairs World Cup | (Argentina) Federico Chingotto | 2–6 / 7–5 / 6–2 | (Argentina) Agustín Tapia (Spain) Arturo Coello | 53rd |
| 89. | 16 November 2025 | (United Arab Emirates) Dubai P1 | (Argentina) Federico Chingotto | 3–6 / 4–6 | (Argentina) Agustín Tapia (Spain) Arturo Coello | |
| 90. | 30 November 2025 | Mexico Major | (Argentina) Federico Chingotto | 4–6 / 6–7 | (Argentina) Agustín Tapia (Spain) Arturo Coello | |
| 91. | 14 December 2025 | (Spain) Premier Padel Finals | (Argentina) Federico Chingotto | 7–6 / 3–6 / 6–7 | (Argentina) Agustín Tapia (Spain) Arturo Coello | |
2026
| 92. | 14 February 2026 | (Saudi Arabia) Riyadh P1 | (Argentina) Federico Chingotto | 4–6 / 2–6 | (Argentina) Agustín Tapia (Spain) Arturo Coello | |
| 93. | 8 March 2026 | (Spain) Gijón P2 | (Argentina) Federico Chingotto | 7–5 / 7–6 | (Argentina) Agustín Tapia (Spain) Arturo Coello | 54th |
| 94. | 29 March 2026 | (United States) Miami P1 | (Argentina) Federico Chingotto | 7–5 / 3–6 / 6–3 | (Argentina) Agustín Tapia (Spain) Arturo Coello | 55th |
| 95. | 18 April 2026 | (Egypt) Giza P2 | (Argentina) Federico Chingotto | 6–4 / 6–1 | (Argentina) Franco Stupaczuk (Spain) Mike Yanguas | 56th |
| 96. | 10 May 2026 | (Paraguay) Asunción P2 | (Argentina) Federico Chingotto | 6–3 / 7–5 | (Argentina) Agustín Tapia (Spain) Arturo Coello | 57th |
| 97. | 17 May 2026 | (Argentina) Buenos Aires P1 | (Argentina) Federico Chingotto | 6–2 / 6–1 | (Argentina) Agustín Tapia (Spain) Arturo Coello | 58th |
| 98. | 7 June 2026 | Italy Major | (Argentina) Federico Chingotto | 5–7 / 6–7 | (Argentina) Agustín Tapia (Spain) Arturo Coello | |
| 99. | 14 June 2026 | (Spain) Valencia P1 | (Argentina) Federico Chingotto | 7–6 / 1–6 / 6–7 | (Argentina) Agustín Tapia (Spain) Arturo Coello | |
| 100. | 28 June 2026 | (Spain) Valladolid P2 | (Argentina) Federico Chingotto | 4–6 / 3–6 | (Argentina) Agustín Tapia (Spain) Arturo Coello | |
| 101. | 5 July 2026 | (France) Bordeaux P2 | (Argentina) Federico Chingotto | 7–5 / 6–7 / 2–6 | (Argentina) Agustín Tapia (Spain) Arturo Coello | |
| 102. | 2 August 2026 | (South Africa) Pretoria P1 | (Argentina) Federico Chingotto | 6–2 / 5–7 / 7–6 | (Spain) Francisco Guerrero (Spain) Javier Leal | 59th |
| 103. | 9 August 2026 | (United Kingdom) London P1 | (Argentina) Federico Chingotto | 6–3 / 5–7 / 7–5 | (Argentina) Agustín Tapia (Spain) Arturo Coello | |
| 104. | 6 September 2026 | (Spain) Madrid P1 | (Argentina) Federico Chingotto | 6–4 / 5–7 / 6–4 | (Spain) Coki Nieto (Spain) Mike Yanguas | 60th |
| 105. | 9 August 2026 | (France) Paris Major | (Argentina) Federico Chingotto | 3–6 / 6–4 / 6–7 | (Argentina) Agustín Tapia (Spain) Arturo Coello | |

| Tournaments won | P2 | P1 | Major | PP Final | FIP Pairs World Cup | Total |
|---|---|---|---|---|---|---|
| Tournaments won | 9 | 12 | 4 | 0 | 1 | 26 |

=== FIP Competitions ===
- 2017 European Pairs Championship - winner with Spain Padel Federation
- 2018 FIP World Padel National Pairs Championships - winner with Juan Lebrón
- 2021 World Championship - winner representing Spain

==== Other Titles ====
- 2017 Spanish National Championship - winner with Juani Mieres
- 2018 Spanish National Championship - winner with Madrid Padel Federation
- 2019 Spanish National Championship - winner with Madrid Padel Federation

== Teammates ==
- Juan Cruz Belluati (01/2016 – 12/2017);
- Matías Díaz (01/2018 – 12/2018);
- Juani Mieres (01/2019 – 07/2019);
- Pablo Lima (07/2019 – 12/2019);
- Juan Lebrón (01/2020 – 03/2024);
- Federico Chingotto (03/2024 – present);

== Personal life ==
Between 2021 and 2024 he had a relationship with the actress Andrea Duro.
