= 2018 World Padel Tour =

Padel circuit in 2018

Details
- Duration: 19 March – 16 December
- Edition: 6th
- Tournaments: 24
- Categories: Challenger (7); Open (11); WOpen (1); Master (4); Masters Finals (1)

Achievements (singles)
- Most titles: Men's (Argentina) Maxi Sánchez (Argentina) Sanyo Gutiérrez (8); Women's (Spain) Alejandra Salazar (Spain) Marta Marrero (6)
- Most finals: Men's (Argentina) Maxi Sánchez (Argentina) Sanyo Gutiérrez (12); Women's (Spain) Mapi Sánchez (Spain) Majo Sánchez (13)

The 2018 World Padel Tour was the sixth edition of the World Padel Tour, the most prestigious professional padel circuit in the world. In the male division, Maxi Sánchez and Sanyo Gutiérrez dethroned Fernando Belasteguín and Pablo Lima, to become the first non-Belasteguín pair in seventeen years to reach the number 1 rank. In the female division Mapi Sánchez and Majo Sánchez achieved their fourth number one rank in five years.

== Season Summary ==
=== Partner and ranking changes ===
In the women’s category, all four top-ranked pairs remained together for the new season. The only change occurred after the first tournament, with Gemma Triay & Lucia Sainz moving up to become the second-ranked pair, while Alejandra Salazar & Marta Marrero dropped to the third-ranked spot.

In the men’s category, two of the top four pairs remained together; the world number ones Fernando Belasteguín & Pablo Lima, as well as the duo of Cristián Gutiérrez & Franco Stupaczuk. New pairings included Maxi Sánchez and Sanyo Gutiérrez, who joined forces with the goal of reaching the number one spot, though they began as the second-ranked pair, and Paquito Navarro, who teamed up with 14-time world number one Juan Martín Díaz to start as the third-ranked pair.

=== First part of the season ===
==== March–May ====
At the season's inaugural tournament in Badalona, the world number 1 pairs, in both men’s and women’s divisions, failed to reach the final, allowing the number 2 pairs to seize the title. In the following tournament, Belasteguin & Lima emerged victorious on the men’s side, while Marrero & Salazar claimed the prize in the women’s draw.

In the two tournaments that followed, Maxi & Sanyo would win both the Zaragoza and Jaén Open's after defeating Juan Martín Díaz & Paquito Navarro in both finals. Meanwhile, on the women’s side, world number 1s Majo & Mapi Sánchez secured their first trophy of the year in Zaragoza, and the number second ranked pair, Gemma & Lucía, captured their second title of the year in Jaén, with the number two pairs on both divisions establishing themselves as threat to the world number ones.

==== June–July ====
In the first and only tournament of June, in Valladolid, both second-seeded pairs reached the final, though with different outcomes. Gemma & Lucia defeated Majo & Mapi to claim their third title in five tournaments, while Maxi & Sanyo lost their final to Alejandro Galán & Matías Díaz, giving Galán the first title of his career, but costing Sanyo his first chance to dethrone Bela & Lima from the top spot in the rankings.

However, at the following tournament, the Valencia Master, it was the world number ones who reigned supreme. Mapi & Majo secured their second title after defeating Ariana Sánchez & Marta Ortega (the first pair outside the top3 to reach a final), while Bela & Lima crushed Maxi & Sanyo in a final where the world number one ranking was on the line. They then finsihed the month by winning the Swedish Open, which only had a men's draw.

=== Second part of the season ===
==== August–September ====
However, things would change in the second half of the season. At the eighth tournament of the season, Belasteguín suffered an injury that forced him to miss the next eight events, taking him out of the race for the world number 1 spot, and ensuring that for the first time in 16 years he would not finish the year as the number 1 player or as part of the number 1-ranked pair. Maxi & Sanyo took full advantage of his absence, winning the Mijas and Andorra Open's and closing the gap on the top spot. Similarly, Mapi & Majo also won both tournaments, setting themselves on a clear path to finish the year as the number 1-ranked players.

While twins Majo and Mapi claimed another title in Lugo, Sanyo missed a third opportunity to reached the first spot in the rankings after being eliminated in the quarterfinals, with Alejandro Galán & Matías Díaz securing their second title of the year. However, at the following tournament, the Portugal Master, neither pair wasted their chance; the twins defeated the world’s number-two pair, Gemma Triay & Lucia Sainz, in the final, moving closer to mathematically securing the year-end number-one ranking, while Maxi Sánchez & Sanyo Gutiérrez captured their sixth title of the year, with Maxi dethroning Pablo Lima to become the new world number one.

September concluded with the Madrid WOpen, the first-ever tournament exclusively for women, which saw Alejandra Salazar & Marta Marrero defeat Majo & Mapi Sánchez (who played in their tenth consecutive final) to claim their third title of the season.

==== October–December ====
In the final four tournaments of the regular season, Majo & Mapi reached every final but failed to win any of them, losing to Gemma & Lucia in Granada, and to Marrero & Salazar at the Euskadi and Murcia Open's (there was no women’s draw in Argentina). However, between the latter two events, they won the World Pairs Championship, avenging their earlier defeat to Gemma & Lucia. Nevertheless, these results were sufficient for them to finish the season as the world number 1s.

On the men’s side, Maxi & Sanyo reached three of the four finals. First they lost to Cristián Gutiérrez & Franco Stupaczuk in Granada, and then failed to reach the final in Euskadi, where Lima and Paquito Navarro took the title. They would finish the regular season winning the Argentina Master and the Murcia Open, mathematically securing their position as the season-ending number 1s.

In the final tournament of the season, the Master Final, Lima, who had reunited with Belasteguín following the argentinian return from injury, defeated Maxi & Sanyo in the final, ending the year as the "maestros." Similarly, in the women’s division, the number two-ranked pair also finished the year as the "maestras" and the pair with most trophies, with Marrero & Salazar winning the tournament in what was their final competition as a duo.

== Tournaments and results ==
Open Master Challenger Master Final

Tournament	Date	Men's			Women's		
Tournament	Date	Winners	Score	Runners-up	Winners	Score	Runners-up
(Spain) Catalunya Master	19 – 25 March	(Argentina) Maxi Sánchez (Argentina) Sanyo Gutiérrez	6–4 / 6–2	(Argentina) Juan Cruz Belluati (Spain) Juan Lebrón	(Spain) Gemma Triay (Spain) Lucía Sainz	6–2 / 5–7 / 6–4	(Spain) Alejandra Salazar (Spain) Marta Marrero
(Spain) Alicante Open	2 – 8 April	(Argentina) Fernando Belasteguín (Brazil) Pablo Lima	7–6 / 3–0 / WO	(Argentina) Cristián Gutiérrez (Argentina) Franco Stupaczuk	(Spain) Alejandra Salazar (Spain) Marta Marrero	6–3 / 7–6	(Spain) Mapi Sánchez (Spain) Majo Sánchez
(Spain) Zaragoza Open	30 April – 6 May	(Argentina) Maxi Sánchez (Argentina) Sanyo Gutiérrez	6–4 / 6–7 / 6–3	(Spain) Juan Martín Díaz (Spain) Paquito Navarro	(Spain) Gemma Triay (Spain) Lucía Sainz	6–7 / 7–6 / 6–1	(Spain) Mapi Sánchez (Spain) Majo Sánchez
(Spain) Jaén Open	21 – 27 May	(Argentina) Maxi Sánchez (Argentina) Sanyo Gutiérrez	6–3 / 6–3	(Spain) Juan Martín Díaz (Spain) Paquito Navarro	(Spain) Mapi Sánchez (Spain) Majo Sánchez	7–5 / 6–3	(Spain) Gemma Triay (Spain) Lucía Sainz
(Spain) Madrid Challenger	29 May – 3 June	(Argentina) Maxi Grabiel (Spain) Pablo Lijó	6–3 / 6–2	(Spain) Javier Ruiz (Spain) Uri Botello	Not contested		
(Portugal) Lisbon Challenger	4 – 10 June	(Spain) Javier Ruiz (Spain) Uri Botello	6–3 / 7–5	(Spain) Diego Ramos (Spain) Rafael Méndez	Not contested		
(Spain) Valladolid Open	18 – 24 June	(Spain) Alejandro Galán (Spain) Matías Díaz	7–5 / 3–6 / 6–3	(Argentina) Maxi Sánchez (Argentina) Sanyo Gutiérrez	(Spain) Gemma Triay (Spain) Lucía Sainz	6–4 / 4–6 / 6–3	(Spain) Mapi Sánchez (Spain) Majo Sánchez
(Spain) Melilla Challenger	26 June – 1 July	(Spain) Javier Ruiz (Spain) Uri Botello	6–4 / 7–5	(Argentina) Agustin Gomez Silingo (Spain) Alex Ruiz	(Spain) Ariana Sánchez (Spain) Marta Ortega	6–3 / 6–4	(Spain) Carolina Navarro (Argentina) Cecilia Reiter
(Spain) Valencia Master	2 – 8 July	(Argentina) Fernando Belasteguín (Brazil) Pablo Lima	6–0 / 6–2	(Argentina) Maxi Sánchez (Argentina) Sanyo Gutiérrez	(Spain) Mapi Sánchez (Spain) Majo Sánchez	6–3 / 6–4	(Spain) Ariana Sánchez (Spain) Marta Ortega
(Spain) Cabrera de Mar Challenger	9 – 15 July	(Spain) José Diestro (Spain) Victor Ruiz	6–3 / 6–3	(Argentina) Adrián Allemandi (Spain) Javier Garrido	Not contested		
(Sweden) Swedish Open	23 – 29 July	(Argentina) Fernando Belasteguín (Brazil) Pablo Lima	6–2 / 3–6 / 6–3	(Spain) Juan Martín Díaz (Spain) Paquito Navarro	Not contested		
(Spain) Mijas Open	6 – 12 August	(Argentina) Maxi Sánchez (Argentina) Sanyo Gutiérrez	6–2 / 7–5	(Argentina) Juan Cruz Belluati (Spain) Juan Lebrón	(Spain) Mapi Sánchez (Spain) Majo Sánchez	6–1 / 6–3	(Spain) Elisabeth Amatriaín (Spain) Patricia Llaguno
Andorra Open	20 – 26 August	(Argentina) Maxi Sánchez (Argentina) Sanyo Gutiérrez	5–7 / 6–4 / 6–4	(Argentina) Cristián Gutiérrez (Argentina) Franco Stupaczuk	(Spain) Mapi Sánchez (Spain) Majo Sánchez	7–6 / 6–7 / 6–4	(Spain) Alejandra Salazar (Spain) Marta Marrero
(Spain) Lugo Open	3 – 9 September	(Spain) Alejandro Galán (Spain) Matías Díaz	6–0 / 6–4	(Argentina) Lucho Capra (Argentina) Ramiro Moyano	(Spain) Alejandra Salazar (Spain) Marta Marrero	6–2 / 6–3	(Spain) Mapi Sánchez (Spain) Majo Sánchez
Portugal Master	17 – 23 September	(Argentina) Maxi Sánchez (Argentina) Sanyo Gutiérrez	7–6 / 7–5	(Spain) Juani Mieres (Argentina) Miguel Lamperti	(Spain) Mapi Sánchez (Spain) Majo Sánchez	0–6 / 6–4 / 7–5	(Spain) Gemma Triay (Spain) Lucía Sainz
(Spain) Madrid WOpen	24 – 30 September	Not contested			(Spain) Alejandra Salazar (Spain) Marta Marrero	6–2 / 4–6 / 6–4	(Spain) Mapi Sánchez (Spain) Majo Sánchez
(Spain) Villa de San Javier Challenger	1 – 7 October	(Argentina) Maxi Grabiel (Spain) Pablo Lijó	6–3 / 6–3	(Spain) Victor Ruiz (Spain) Willy Lahoz	(Spain) Elisabeth Amatriain (Spain) Patricia Llaguno	6–2 / 3–6 / 6–2	(Spain) Beatriz González (Spain) Catalina Tenorio
(Spain) Granada Open	8 – 14 October	(Argentina) Cristián Gutiérrez (Argentina) Franco Stupaczuk	2–6 / 7–6 / 6–2	(Argentina) Maxi Sánchez (Argentina) Sanyo Gutiérrez	(Spain) Gemma Triay (Spain) Lucía Sainz	6–1 / 6–4	(Spain) Ariana Sánchez (Spain) Marta Ortega
(France) Paris Challenger	14 – 21 October	(Argentina) Federico Chingotto (Argentina) Juan Tello	7–5 / 6–7 / 6–2	(Argentina) Lucho Capra (Argentina) Ramiro Moyano	Not contested		
(Spain) Euskadi Open	22 – 28 October	(Brazil) Pablo Lima (Spain) Paquito Navarro	6–3 / 6–3	(Spain) Juani Mieres (Argentina) Miguel Lamperti	(Spain) Alejandra Salazar (Spain) Marta Marrero	6–3 / 2–6 / 6–4	(Spain) Mapi Sánchez (Spain) Majo Sánchez
Argentina Master	5 – 11 November	(Argentina) Maxi Sánchez (Argentina) Sanyo Gutiérrez	6–7 / 6–4 / 6–2	(Argentina) Adrián Allemandi (Argentina) Agustín Silingo	Not contested		
(Spain) Arroyo de la Encomienda Challenger	11 – 18 November	(Argentina) Federico Chingotto (Argentina) Juan Tello	6–3 / 6–4	(Spain) Alex Ruiz (Spain) Pablo Lijó	(Portugal) Ana Catarina Nogueira (Argentina) Delfina Brea	6–2 / WO	(Spain) Carolina Navarro (Argentina) Cecilia Reiter
(Spain) Murcia Open	19 – 25 November	(Argentina) Maxi Sánchez (Argentina) Sanyo Gutiérrez	2–6 / 7–5 / 6–3	(Brazil) Pablo Lima (Spain) Paquito Navarro	(Spain) Alejandra Salazar (Spain) Marta Marrero	7–5 / 4–6 / 6–1	(Spain) Mapi Sánchez (Spain) Majo Sánchez
(Spain) Master Final	13 – 16 December	(Argentina) Fernando Belasteguín (Brazil) Pablo Lima	7–6 / 6–3	(Argentina) Maxi Sánchez (Argentina) Sanyo Gutiérrez	(Spain) Alejandra Salazar (Spain) Marta Marrero	6–3 / 6–2	(Spain) Mapi Sánchez (Spain) Majo Sánchez

== End of season ranking ==
=== Men's Ranking ===
2018 Men's Ranking			Tournament Statistics				Tournaments Won			
N.º	Name	Points	Matches	Wins	Losses	Win %	Open	Master	Master Final	Total
1	(Argentina) Maxi Sánchez	13.820	59	51	8	86.44	5	3	0	8
1	(Argentina) Sanyo Gutiérrez	13.820	59	51	8	86.44	5	3	0	8
3	(Brazil) Pablo Lima	8.330	40	32	8	80	3	1	1	5
4	(Spain) Paquito Navarro	7.035	48	34	14	70.83	1	0	0	1
5	(Spain) Juan Martín Díaz	6.570	52	36	16	69.23	0	0	0	0
6	(Spain) Alejandro Galán	6.200	45	31	14	68.89	2	0	0	2
6	(Spain) Matías Díaz	6.200	45	31	14	68.89	2	0	0	2
8	(Argentina) Fernando Belasteguín	6.060	25	21	4	84	2	1	1	4
9	(Argentina) Miguel Lamperti	5.145	51	35	16	68.63	0	0	0	0
9	(Spain) Juani Mieres	5.145	51	35	16	68.63	0	0	0	0
11	(Argentina) Franco Stupaczuk	4.925	42	27	15	64.29	1	0	0	1
11	(Argentina) Cristián Gutiérrez	4.925	42	27	15	64.29	1	0	0	1
13	(Spain) Juan Lebrón	4.920	49	33	16	67.35	0	0	0	0
14	(Argentina) Juan Cruz Belluati	4.095	43	27	16	62.79	0	0	0	0
15	(Spain) Javier Ruíz	4.055	41	25	16	64	0	0	0	0
15	(Spain) Uri Botello	4.055	41	25	16	64	0	0	0	0

=== Women's Ranking ===
2018 Women's Ranking			Tournament Statistics				Tournaments Won			
N.º	Name	Points	Matches	Wins	Losses	Win %	Open	Master	Master Final	Total
1	(Spain) Majo Sánchez	12.350	57	47	10	82.46	3	2	0	5
1	(Spain) Mapi Sánchez	12.350	57	47	10	82.46	3	2	0	5
3	(Spain) Marta Marrero	10.760	51	42	9	82.35	5	0	1	6
3	(Spain) Alejandra Salazar	10.760	51	42	9	82.35	5	0	1	6
5	(Spain) Gemma Triay	9.325	48	37	11	77.08	3	1	0	4
5	(Spain) Lucia Sainz	9.325	48	37	11	77.08	3	1	0	4
7	(Spain) Ariana Sánchez	5.810	41	26	15	63.41	0	0	0	0
7	(Spain) Marta Ortega	5.810	41	26	15	63.41	0	0	0	0
9	(Spain) Elisabeth Amatriain	4.320	43	28	15	65.12	0	0	0	0
9	(Spain) Patricia Llaguno	4.320	43	28	15	65.12	0	0	0	0
11	(Spain) Carolina Navarro	3.705	43	28	15	65.12	0	0	0	0
11	(Argentina) Cecilia Reiter	3.705	43	28	15	65.12	0	0	0	0
13	(Spain) Beatriz González	3.350	40	25	15	62.5	0	0	0	0
13	(Spain) Catalina Tenorio	3.350	40	25	15	62.5	0	0	0	0
15	(Spain) Teresa Navarro	2.520	36	21	15	58.33	0	0	0	0
15	(Spain) Victoria Iglesias	2.520	36	21	15	58.33	0	0	0	0

== See also ==
- 2018 FIP World Padel National Pairs Championships
- List of FIP number 1 ranked padel players
