= 2018 WPT Alicante Open =

World Padel Tour tournament held in Alicante, Spain

- Date: 1 – 8 April
- Edition: 11th (Note: The first seven editions were held under the organization of the Padel Pro Tour.)
- Category: Open
- Location: Alicante, Spain
- Venue: Centro de Tecnificación Deportiva

Champions
- Men's doubles: (Argentina) Fernando Belasteguín (Brazil) Pablo Lima
- Women's doubles: (Spain) Alejandra Salazar (Spain) Marta Marrero

Chronology

The 2018 Alicante Open (officially 2018 World Padel Tour Alicante Open) was the second tournament of the sixth season organized by World Padel Tour, the most prestigious padel circuit at the time.

In the women's category, Alejandra Salazar and Marta Marrero reached the final after defeating Gemma Triay and Lucia Sainz in the semifinals, a rematch of the previous tournament. In the title match, Marrero and Salazar defeated the world number ones, twins Majo and Mapi, securing their first title of the season and their first in over a year. With this victory, they claimed their first title together as a pair in Alicante (Salazar's second title there).

In the men's category, Fernando Belasteguin and Pablo Lima bounced back from their slip-up in the previous tournament, defeating Juan Martin Diaz and Paquito Navarro to reach the final, where they would face Cristian Gutiérrez and Franco Stupaczuk. In the decisive match, the world number-one pair defeated Gutiérrez and Stupaczuk, after their opponents were forced to retire due to injury during the second set, securing their first title of the year and their second together in Alicante (Belasteguin's eighth and Lima's third individually).

== Head-to-head record between teams ranked in the top 4 during the season ==
=== Men's ===
Record	Belasteguín–Lima	Maxi–Sanyo	J.M. Díaz–Paquito	Gutiérrez–Stupaczuk
Belasteguín–Lima	—	—	1–0	1–0
Maxi–Sanyo	—	—	—	—
J.M. Díaz–Paquito	0–1	—	—	—
Gutiérrez–Stupaczuk	0–1	—	—	—

=== Women's ===
Record	Majo–Mapi	Marrero–Salazar	Triay–Sainz	Ariana–Ortega
Majo–Mapi	—	0–1	0–1	—
Marrero–Salazar	1–0	—	1–1	1–0
Triay–Sainz	1–0	1–1	—	—
Ariana–Ortega	—	0–1	—	—

== Draws ==
=== Men's Bracket ===
Round of 32
1	(Argentina) Belasteguín / (Brazil) Lima
Bye
(Brazil) M. Jardim / (Argentina) Tapia	6	6
Q	(Argentina) M. Nicoletti / (Spain) T. Bueno	3	0
(Argentina) A. Patiniotis / (Spain) P.A. Martinez	0	6
(Argentina) M. Grabiel / (Spain) P. Lijó	6	7
Q	(Spain) J. Vázquez / (Brazil) L. Da Cunha	1	2
6	(Spain) J. Mieres / (Argentina) M. Lamperti	6	6
Q	(Spain) J. Rico / (Spain) V. Ruiz	4	6	6
(Brazil) L. Bergamini / (Brazil) L. Campagnolo	6	3	2
(Spain) A. Santana / (Spain) I. Gadea	6	3
(Spain) A. Cepero / (Argentina) Godo Díaz	7	6
(Argentina) F. Poggi / (Argentina) G. Reca	6	3	6
(Argentina) G. Tamame / (Argentina) M. Marina	4	6	2
Bye
3	(Spain) J.M. Díaz / (Spain) Paquito
4	(Argentina) C. Gutiérrez / (Argentina) Stupaczuk
Bye
(Argentina) A. Allemandi / (Argentina) F. Quiles
(Argentina) A. Silingo / (Spain) G. Company
(Argentina) J.C. Belluati / (Spain) Lebrón	3	6	6
(Spain) J.G. Diestro / (Argentina) S. Nerone	6	2	3
(Spain) M. Piñeiro / (Spain) W. Lahoz	6	7
(Argentina) L. Capra / (Argentina) R. Moyano	4	6
5	(Spain) Galán / (Spain) M. Díaz	6	6
(Spain) A. Blanco / (Spain) B. Yribarren	2	3
(Argentina) J. Escalante / (Spain) J. Muñoz	3	1
(Spain) J. Ruiz / (Spain) U. Botello	6	6
(Argentina) Chingotto / (Argentina) J. Tello	3	6	6
Q	(Spain) G. Rubio / (Spain) J. Garrido	6	1	3
Bye
2	(Argentina) Maxi / (Argentina) Sanyo

Round of 16
1	(Argentina) Belasteguín / (Brazil) Lima
(Brazil) M. Jardim / (Argentina) Tapia
(Argentina) M. Grabiel / (Spain) P. Lijó	3	1
6	(Spain) J. Mieres / (Argentina) M. Lamperti	6	6
Q	(Spain) J. Rico / (Spain) V. Ruiz	7	6
(Spain) A. Cepero / (Argentina) Godo Díaz	6	2
(Argentina) F. Poggi / (Argentina) G. Reca	3	3
3	(Spain) J.M. Díaz / (Spain) Paquito	6	6
4	(Argentina) C. Gutiérrez / (Argentina) Stupaczuk	4	6	6
(Argentina) A. Silingo / (Spain) G. Company	6	3	1
(Argentina) J.C. Belluati / (Spain) Lebrón	6	6
(Spain) M. Piñeiro / (Spain) W. Lahoz	1	3
5	(Spain) Galán / (Spain) M. Díaz	6	6
(Spain) J. Ruiz / (Spain) U. Botello	3	3
(Argentina) Chingotto / (Argentina) J. Tello	2	2
2	(Argentina) Maxi / (Argentina) Sanyo	6	6

Quarter-Final
1	(Argentina) Belasteguín / (Brazil) Lima	6	6
6	(Spain) J. Mieres / (Argentina) M. Lamperti	3	3
Q	(Spain) J. Rico / (Spain) V. Ruiz	3	4
3	(Spain) J.M. Díaz / (Spain) Paquito	6	6
4	(Argentina) C. Gutiérrez / (Argentina) Stupaczuk	7	6
(Argentina) J.C. Belluati / (Spain) Lebrón	6	3
5	(Spain) Galán / (Spain) M. Díaz	6	6	6
2	(Argentina) Maxi / (Argentina) Sanyo	7	3	4

Semi-Finals
1	(Argentina) Belasteguín / (Brazil) Lima	6	7
3	(Spain) J.M. Díaz / (Spain) Paquito	1	5
4	(Argentina) C. Gutiérrez / (Argentina) Stupaczuk	6	6
5	(Spain) Galán / (Spain) M. Díaz	4	4

Finals
1	(Argentina) Belasteguín / (Brazil) Lima	7	3	*
4	(Argentina) C. Gutiérrez / (Argentina) Stupaczuk	6	0

=== Women's Bracket ===
Round of 32
1	(Spain) Majo / (Spain) Mapi
Bye
(Spain) A. Cantin / (Spain) N. Rodriguez	6	6
(Spain) C. Mesa / (Spain) M. Talavan	3	4
(Argentina) A. Osoro / (Argentina) N. Brito	6	6
Q	(Spain) E. Orpinell / (Spain) N. Traviesa	2	1
(Spain) A. Medina / (Argentina) G. Bartomioli	1	0
(Spain) C. Navarro / (Argentina) C. Reiter	6	6
(Spain) E. Amatriain / (Spain) P. Llaguno	6	6
(Spain) A. Tapia / (Portugal) S. Araújo	3	4
(France) Collombon / (Spain) S. Pujals	4	6	3
(Spain) P. Josemaria / (Argentina) V. Pavon	6	2	6
(France) L. Clergue / (Spain) M. Truchado	3	2
(Spain) L. Alonso / (Argentina) V. Riera	6	6
Bye
4	(Spain) A. Sánchez / (Spain) M. Ortega
3	(Spain) A. Salazar / (Spain) M. Marrero
Bye
(Spain) M. Gonzalez / (Spain) S. Vidal	1	2
(Spain) A. Galán / (Spain) M. Villalba	6	6
(Spain) A.F. de Ossó / (Spain) M. Gabarrus	6	7
(Spain) C. Pérez / (Spain) N. Marquez	4	6
(Portugal) A.C. Nogueira / (Argentina) Delfina	6	3	3
(Spain) B. González / (Argentina) C. Tenorio	3	6	6
(Spain) T. Navarro / (Spain) V. Iglesias	6	7
(Spain) L. Martínez / (Spain) T. Icardo	0	6
(Spain) A. Blanco / (Spain) B. Caldera	4	6
(Spain) I. Domínguez / (Spain) V. Alonso	6	7
Q	(Spain) C. Siverio / (Spain) M. Luján	2	1
(Spain) S. Hernández / (Spain) V. Virseda	6	6
Bye
2	(Spain) Gemma / (Spain) L. Sainz

Round of 16
1	(Spain) Majo / (Spain) Mapi	6	6
(Spain) A. Cantin / (Spain) N. Rodriguez	1	1
(Argentina) A. Osoro / (Argentina) N. Brito	7	4	1
(Spain) C. Navarro / (Argentina) C. Reiter	6	6	6
(Spain) E. Amatriain / (Spain) P. Llaguno	6	6
(Spain) P. Josemaria / (Argentina) V. Pavon	3	3
(Spain) L. Alonso / (Argentina) V. Riera	6	2	3
4	(Spain) A. Sánchez / (Spain) M. Ortega	4	6	6
3	(Spain) A. Salazar / (Spain) M. Marrero	6	6
(Spain) A. Galán / (Spain) M. Villalba	4	2
(Spain) A.F. de Ossó / (Spain) M. Gabarrus	6	5	2
(Spain) B. González / (Argentina) C. Tenorio	4	7	6
(Spain) T. Navarro / (Spain) V. Iglesias	6	6
(Spain) I. Domínguez / (Spain) V. Alonso	1	4
(Spain) S. Hernández / (Spain) V. Virseda	1	3
2	(Spain) Gemma / (Spain) L. Sainz	6	6

Quarter-Final
1	(Spain) Majo / (Spain) Mapi	6	6
(Spain) C. Navarro / (Argentina) C. Reiter	1	1
(Spain) E. Amatriain / (Spain) P. Llaguno	2	6	6
4	(Spain) A. Sánchez / (Spain) M. Ortega	6	4	3
3	(Spain) A. Salazar / (Spain) M. Marrero	6	6
(Spain) B. González / (Argentina) C. Tenorio	1	3
(Spain) T. Navarro / (Spain) V. Iglesias	6	4	2
2	(Spain) Gemma / (Spain) L. Sainz	4	6	6

Semi-Finals
1	(Spain) Majo / (Spain) Mapi	6	7
(Spain) E. Amatriain / (Spain) P. Llaguno	4	6
3	(Spain) A. Salazar / (Spain) M. Marrero	6	6
2	(Spain) Gemma / (Spain) L. Sainz	2	4

Finals
1	(Spain) Majo / (Spain) Mapi	3	6
3	(Spain) A. Salazar / (Spain) M. Marrero	6	7

== Results ==
=== Round of 32 ===
Men's

Date	Winners	Score	Opponent	Refs.
4/4/2018	(Argentina) Agustín Tapia (Brazil) Marcello Jardim	6–3 / 6–0	(Argentina) Matías Nicoletti (Spain) Toni Bueno	
4/4/2018	(Argentina) Maxi Grabiel (Spain) Pablo Lijó	6–0 / 7–6	(Argentina) Aris Patiniotis (Spain) Pedro Alonso Martinez	
4/4/2018	(Spain) Juani Mieres (Argentina) Miguel Lamperti	6–1 / 6–2	(Spain) Javier Martínez Vázquez (Brazil) Lucas Silveira Da Cunha	
4/4/2018	(Spain) José Rico (Spain) Víctor Ruiz	4–6 / 6–3 / 6–2	(Brazil) Lucas Bergamini (Brazil) Lucas Campagnolo	
4/4/2018	(Spain) Álvaro Cepero (Argentina) Godo Díaz	7–6 / 6–3	(Spain) Aday Santana (Spain) Nacho Gadea	
4/4/2018	(Argentina) Fernando Poggi (Argentina) Gaby Reca	6–4 / 3–6 / 6–2	(Argentina) German Tamame (Argentina) Matías Marina	
4/4/2018	(Argentina) Agustin Gomez Silingo (Spain) Gerard Company	6–3 / 3–6 / 6–3	(Argentina) Adrian Allemandi (Argentina) Federico Quiles	
4/4/2018	(Argentina) Juan Cruz Belluati (Spain) Juan Lebrón	3–6 / 6–2 / 6–3	(Spain) José García Diestro (Argentina) Sebastián Nerone	
4/4/2018	(Spain) Martin Sanchez Piñeiro (Spain) Willy Lahoz	6–4 / 7–6	(Argentina) Lucho Capra (Argentina) Ramiro Moyano	
4/4/2018	(Spain) Alejandro Galán (Spain) Matías Díaz	6–2 / 6–3	(Spain) Adrián Blanco (Spain) Borja Yribarren	
4/4/2018	(Spain) Javi Ruiz (Spain) Uri Botello	6–3 / 6–1	(Argentina) Javier Escalante (Spain) Jordi Muñoz	
4/4/2018	(Argentina) Federico Chingotto (Argentina) Juan Tello	3–6 / 6–1 / 6–3	(Spain) Gonzalo Rubio (Spain) Javi Garrido	

Women's

Date	Winners	Score	Opponent	Refs.
4/4/2018	(Spain) Angela Caro Cantin (Spain) Nuria Rodriguez	6–3 / 6–4	(Spain) Carla Mesa (Spain) Marta Talavan	
4/4/2018	(Argentina) Aranzazu Osoro (Argentina) Nela Brito	6–2 / 6–1	(Spain) Eva Gayoso Orpinell (Spain) Nicole Traviesa Mola	
4/4/2018	(Spain) Carolina Navarro (Argentina) Cecilia Reiter	6–1 / 6–0	(Spain) Andrea Medina (Argentina) Gabriela Bartomioli	
4/4/2018	(Spain) Elisabeth Amatriain (Spain) Patricia Llaguno	6–3 / 6–4	(Spain) Anna Cortiles Tapia (Portugal) Sofia Araújo	
4/4/2018	(Spain) Paula Josemaria (Argentina) Valeria Pavon	6–4 / 2–6 / 6–3	(France) Alix Collombon (Spain) Sara Pujals	
4/4/2018	(Spain) Lorena Alonso (Argentina) Virginia Riera	6–3 / 6–2	(France) Laura Clergue (Spain) Meli García Truchado	
4/4/2018	(Spain) Alba Galán (Spain) Maria Villalba	6–1 / 6–2	(Spain) Marta Gonzalez (Spain) Silvia Lopez Vidal	
4/4/2018	(Spain) Ana Fernandez de Ossó (Spain) Maite Gabarrus Alonso	6–4 / 7–6	(Spain) Cynthia Pérez Domenech (Spain) Noelia Marquez	
4/4/2018	(Spain) Beatriz González (Argentina) Catalina Tenorio	3–6 / 6–3 / 6–3	(Portugal) Ana Catarina Nogueira (Argentina) Delfina Brea	
4/4/2018	(Spain) Teresa Navarro (Spain) Victoria Iglesias	6–0 / 7–6	(Spain) Lucía Martínez (Spain) Tamara Icardo	
4/4/2018	(Spain) Isabel Domínguez (Spain) Vanesa Alonso	6–4 / 7–6	(Spain) Alicia Blanco Rojo (Spain) Beatriz Caldera	
4/4/2018	(Spain) Sandra Hernández (Spain) Verónica Virseda	6–2 / 6–1	(Spain) Clara Siverio (Spain) María Pérez Luján	

=== Round of 16 ===
Men's

Date	Winners	Score	Opponent	Refs.
5/4/2018	(Argentina) Fernando Belasteguín (Brazil) Pablo Lima	6–1 / 6–4	(Argentina) Agustín Tapia (Brazil) Marcello Jardim	
5/4/2018	(Spain) Juani Mieres (Argentina) Miguel Lamperti	6–3 / 6–1	(Argentina) Maxi Grabiel (Spain) Pablo Lijó	
5/4/2018	(Spain) José Rico (Spain) Víctor Ruiz	7–6 / 6–2	(Spain) Álvaro Cepero (Argentina) Godo Díaz	
5/4/2018	(Spain) Juan Martin Díaz (Spain) Paquito Navarro	6–3 / 6–3	(Argentina) Fernando Poggi (Argentina) Gaby Reca	
5/4/2018	(Argentina) Cristian Gutiérrez (Argentina) Franco Stupaczuk	4–6 / 6–3 / 6–1	(Argentina) Agustin Gomez Silingo (Spain) Gerard Company	
5/4/2018	(Argentina) Juan Cruz Belluati (Spain) Juan Lebrón	6–1 / 6–3	(Spain) Martin Sanchez Piñeiro (Spain) Willy Lahoz	
5/4/2018	(Spain) Alejandro Galán (Spain) Matías Díaz	6–3 / 6–3	(Spain) Javi Ruiz (Spain) Uri Botello	
5/4/2018	(Argentina) Maxi Sánchez (Argentina) Sanyo Gutiérrez	6–2 / 6–2	(Argentina) Federico Chingotto (Argentina) Juan Tello	

Women's

Date	Winners	Score	Opponent	Refs.
5/4/2018	(Spain) Majo Sanchez (Spain) Mapi Sanchez	6–1 / 6–1	(Spain) Angela Caro Cantin (Spain) Nuria Rodriguez	
5/4/2018	(Spain) Carolina Navarro (Argentina) Cecilia Reiter	6–7 / 6–4 / 6–1	(Argentina) Aranzazu Osoro (Argentina) Nela Brito	
5/4/2018	(Spain) Elisabeth Amatriain (Spain) Patricia Llaguno	6–3 / 6–3	(Spain) Paula Josemaria (Argentina) Valeria Pavon	
5/4/2018	(Spain) Ariana Sánchez (Spain) Marta Ortega	4–6 / 6–2 / 6–3	(Spain) Lorena Alonso (Argentina) Virginia Riera	
5/4/2018	(Spain) Alejandra Salazar (Spain) Marta Marrero	6–4 / 6–2	(Spain) Alba Galán (Spain) Maria Villalba	
5/4/2018	(Spain) Beatriz González (Argentina) Catalina Tenorio	4–6 / 7–5 / 6–2	(Spain) Ana Fernandez de Ossó (Spain) Maite Gabarrus Alonso	
5/4/2018	(Spain) Teresa Navarro (Spain) Victoria Iglesias	6–1 / 6–4	(Spain) Isabel Domínguez (Spain) Vanesa Alonso	
5/4/2018	(Spain) Gemma Triay (Spain) Lucía Sainz	6–1 / 6–3	(Spain) Sandra Hernández (Spain) Verónica Virseda	

=== Quarter-Finals ===
Men's

Date	Winners	Score	Opponent	Refs.
6/4/2018	(Argentina) Fernando Belasteguín (Brazil) Pablo Lima	6–3 / 6–3	(Spain) Juani Mieres (Argentina) Miguel Lamperti	
6/4/2018	(Spain) Juan Martin Díaz (Spain) Paquito Navarro	6–3 / 6–4	(Spain) José Rico (Spain) Víctor Ruiz	
6/4/2018	(Argentina) Cristian Gutiérrez (Argentina) Franco Stupaczuk	7–6 / 6–3	(Argentina) Juan Cruz Belluati (Spain) Juan Lebrón	
6/4/2018	(Spain) Alejandro Galán (Spain) Matías Díaz	6–7 / 6–3 / 6–4	(Argentina) Maxi Sánchez (Argentina) Sanyo Gutiérrez	

Women's

Date	Winners	Score	Opponent	Refs.
6/4/2018	(Spain) Majo Sanchez (Spain) Mapi Sanchez	6–1 / 6–1	(Spain) Carolina Navarro (Argentina) Cecilia Reiter	
6/4/2018	(Spain) Elisabeth Amatriain (Spain) Patricia Llaguno	2–6 / 6–4 / 6–3	(Spain) Ariana Sánchez (Spain) Marta Ortega	
6/4/2018	(Spain) Alejandra Salazar (Spain) Marta Marrero	6–1 / 6–3	(Spain) Beatriz González (Argentina) Catalina Tenorio	
6/4/2018	(Spain) Gemma Triay (Spain) Lucía Sainz	4–6 / 6–4 / 6–2	(Spain) Teresa Navarro (Spain) Victoria Iglesias	

=== Semi-Finals ===
Men's

Date	Winners	Score	Opponent	Refs.
7/4/2018	(Argentina) Fernando Belasteguín (Brazil) Pablo Lima	6–1 / 7–5	(Spain) Juan Martin Díaz (Spain) Paquito Navarro	
7/4/2018	(Argentina) Cristian Gutiérrez (Argentina) Franco Stupaczuk	6–4 / 6–4	(Spain) Alejandro Galán (Spain) Matías Díaz	

Women's

Date	Winners	Score	Opponent	Refs.
7/4/2018	(Spain) Majo Sanchez (Spain) Mapi Sanchez	6–4 / 7–6	(Spain) Elisabeth Amatriain (Spain) Patricia Llaguno	
7/4/2018	(Spain) Alejandra Salazar (Spain) Marta Marrero	6–2 / 6–4	(Spain) Gemma Triay (Spain) Lucía Sainz	

=== Finals ===
Men's

Date	Winners	Score	Opponent	Refs.
8/4/2018	(Argentina) Fernando Belasteguín (Brazil) Pablo Lima	7–6 / 3–0 / W.O.	(Argentina) Cristian Gutiérrez (Argentina) Franco Stupaczuk	

Women's

Date	Winners	Score	Opponent	Refs.
8/4/2018	(Spain) Alejandra Salazar (Spain) Marta Marrero	6–3 / 7–6	(Spain) Majo Sanchez (Spain) Mapi Sanchez	
