= 2018 WPT Andorra Open =

World Padel Tour tournament held in Andorra

- Date: 20 – 26 August
- Edition: 2nd
- Category: Open
- Location: Andorra, Andorra
- Venue: Poliesportiu d'Andorra

Champions
- Men's doubles: (Argentina) Maxi Sánchez (Argentina) Sanyo Gutiérrez
- Women's doubles: (Spain) Mapi Sánchez (Spain) Majo Sánchez

Chronology

The 2018 Andorra Open (officially 2018 World Padel Tour Vallbanc Andorra La Vella Open) was the ninth tournament of the sixth season organized by World Padel Tour, the most prestigious padel circuit at the time.

In the women's category, Mapi and Majo Sánchez reached their seventh consecutive final (out of eight possible), where they faced the world's number three pair, Alejandra Salazar and Marta Marrero, for the second time in 2018. In the title match, the world number ones defeated Marrero and Salazar, with twins Majo and Mapi Sánchez claiming their fourth title of the season and successfully defending the title they had won in Andorra the previous year.

In the men's category, Cristian Gutiérrez and Franco Stupaczuk reached their first final of the season, where they faced the top seeds. In the title match, Maxi Sánchez and Sanyo Gutiérrez, playing their seventh final of the season out of nine possible, defeated Gutiérrez and Stupaczuk to claim their fifth title of the year and further narrow the gap to world number one Pablo Lima. With this victory, Maxi and Sanyo claimed their first title as a pair in Andorra, while Sanyo successfully defended the title he had won the previous year.

== Relevant Data ==
=== Belasteguin loses the world N.1 ranking for the first time in 16 years ===
Fernando Belasteguín's absence due to an injury sustained in the previous tournament, combined with Pablo Lima's participation in Andorra alongside Marcello Jardim, has made the Brazilian the new world number one, leading by just 180 points. This marked a historic moment in padel, as it is the first time in 16 years (a total of 200 months) that Belasteguin has lost the top spot in the world rankings.

Lima, who was eliminated in the quarterfinals of the Andorra tournament, now held 13,440 points following the ranking update, with Sanyo Gutiérrez in second place, trailing by 165 points.

World Rankings
| Position | Player | Points |
|---|---|---|
| 1. | (Brazil) Pablo Lima | 13,440 |
| 2. | (Argentina) Sanyo Gutiérrez | 13,275 |
| 3. | (Argentina) Fernando Belasteguin | 13,260 |
| 4. | (Argentina) Maxi Sánchez | 12,180 |
| 5. | (Spain) Paquito Navarro | 9,395 |

== Head-to-head record between teams ranked in the top 4 during the season ==
=== Men's ===
| Record | Maxi–Sanyo | Lima–M. Jardim | J.M. Díaz–Paquito | Galán–M. Díaz | Former Pairs | Gutiérrez–Stupaczuk | Belasteguín–Lima |
| Maxi–Sanyo | — | — | 4–0 | 2–3 | | 3–0 | 0–1 |
| Lima–M. Jardim | — | — | — | — | | 0–1 | — |
| J.M. Díaz–Paquito | 0–4 | — | — | 2–1 | | — | 0–2 |
| Galán–M. Díaz | 3–2 | — | 1–2 | — | | 1–2 | 0–1 |
| Former Pairs | | | | | | | |
| Gutiérrez–Stupaczuk | 0–3 | 1–0 | — | 2–1 | | — | 0–1 |
| Belasteguín–Lima | 1–0 | — | 2–0 | 1–0 | | 1–0 | — |

=== Women's ===
| Record | Majo–Mapi | Marrero–Salazar | Triay–Sainz | Ariana–Ortega | Former Pairs | Amatriain–Llaguno |
| Majo–Mapi | — | 3–1 | 2–3 | 1–0 | | 4–0 |
| Marrero–Salazar | 1–3 | — | 2–3 | 2–0 | | 1–0 |
| Triay–Sainz | 3–2 | 3–2 | — | 1–0 | | 1–1 |
| Ariana–Ortega | 0–1 | 0–2 | 0–1 | — | | 2–1 |
| Former Pairs | | | | | | |
| Amatriain–Llaguno | 0–4 | 0–1 | 1–1 | 1–2 | | — |

== Draws ==
=== Men's Bracket ===
Round of 32
1 | (Argentina) Maxi / (Argentina) Sanyo
Bye
(Argentina) A. Silingo / (Spain) A. Ruiz | 6 | 6 | 6
(Argentina) F. Quiles / (Brazil) F. Gomes | 4 | 7 | 4
(Spain) Á. Cepero / (Argentina) S. Nerone | 4 | 7 | 6
Q | (Uruguay) D. Ramos / (Spain) R. Méndez | 6 | 6 | 3
Q | (Spain) J. Ruiz / (Spain) M. Solbes | 2 | 1
(Argentina) J.C. Belluati / (Spain) Lebrón | 6 | 6
(Spain) J. Mieres / (Argentina) M. Lamperti | 6 | 6
(Argentina) A. Allemandi / (Spain) J. Garrido | 1 | 4
(Argentina) A. Patiniotis / (Spain) J. Muñoz
(Brazil) L. Bergamini / (Brazil) L. Campagnolo | *
(Argentina) M. Grabiel / (Spain) P. Lijó | 6 | 6
(Spain) J.G. Diestro / (Spain) M. Piñeiro | 1 | 4
Bye
3 | (Spain) J.M. Díaz / (Spain) Paquito
4 | (Spain) Galán / (Spain) M. Díaz
Bye
(Argentina) M. Nicoletti / (Spain) P.A. Martínez | 6 | 7
Q | (Argentina) D. Perino / (Brazil) L. Cunha | 3 | 5
(Argentina) L. Capra / (Argentina) R. Moyano | 5 | 6 | 6
(Argentina) Godo Díaz / (Argentina) G. Tamame | 7 | 2 | 3
(Spain) A. Santana / (Spain) I. Gadea | 1 | 4
(Spain) J. Ruiz / (Spain) U. Botello | 6 | 6
(Argentina) C. Gutiérrez / (Argentina) Stupaczuk | 7 | 6
(Spain) J. Rico / (Argentina) J. Restivo | 6 | 1
Q | (Spain) Coki / (Spain) J. Rico | 6 | 6
(Argentina) F. Chingotto / (Argentina) F. Poggi | 4 | 2
(Spain) B. Yribarren / (Spain) W. Lahoz | 3 | 4
(Spain) G. Rubio / (Spain) E. Moreno | 6 | 6
Bye
2 | (Brazil) Lima / (Brazil) M. Jardim

Round of 16
1 | (Argentina) Maxi / (Argentina) Sanyo | 6 | 7
(Argentina) A. Silingo / (Spain) A. Ruiz | 3 | 6
(Spain) Á. Cepero / (Argentina) S. Nerone | 6 | 3 | 2
(Argentina) J.C. Belluati / (Spain) Lebrón | 4 | 6 | 6
(Spain) J. Mieres / (Argentina) M. Lamperti | 6 | 6
(Brazil) L. Bergamini / (Brazil) L. Campagnolo | 4 | 2
(Argentina) M. Grabiel / (Spain) P. Lijó | 4 | 3
3 | (Spain) J.M. Díaz / (Spain) Paquito | 6 | 6
4 | (Spain) Galán / (Spain) M. Díaz | 7 | 6
(Argentina) M. Nicoletti / (Spain) P.A. Martínez | 5 | 3
(Argentina) L. Capra / (Argentina) R. Moyano | 6 | 3
(Spain) J. Ruiz / (Spain) U. Botello | 7 | 6
(Argentina) C. Gutiérrez / (Argentina) Stupaczuk | 6 | 6
Q | (Spain) Coki / (Spain) J. Rico | 3 | 2
(Spain) G. Rubio / (Spain) E. Moreno | 7 | 4 | 6
2 | (Brazil) Lima / (Brazil) M. Jardim | 5 | 6 | 7

Quarter-Final
1 | (Argentina) Maxi / (Argentina) Sanyo | 7 | 6
(Argentina) J.C. Belluati / (Spain) Lebrón | 6 | 4
(Spain) J. Mieres / (Argentina) M. Lamperti | 1 | 4
3 | (Spain) J.M. Díaz / (Spain) Paquito | 6 | 6
4 | (Spain) Galán / (Spain) M. Díaz | 6 | 7
(Spain) J. Ruiz / (Spain) U. Botello | 4 | 6
(Argentina) C. Gutiérrez / (Argentina) Stupaczuk | 6 | 6
2 | (Brazil) Lima / (Brazil) M. Jardim | 4 | 3

Semi-Finals
1 | (Argentina) Maxi / (Argentina) Sanyo | 7 | 6 | 6
3 | (Spain) J.M. Díaz / (Spain) Paquito | 6 | 7 | 4
4 | (Spain) Galán / (Spain) M. Díaz | 6 | 4 | 5
(Argentina) C. Gutiérrez / (Argentina) Stupaczuk | 2 | 6 | 7

Finals
1 | (Argentina) Maxi / (Argentina) Sanyo | 5 | 6 | 6
(Argentina) C. Gutiérrez / (Argentina) Stupaczuk | 7 | 4 | 4

=== Women's Bracket ===
Round of 32
1 | (Spain) Majo / (Spain) Mapi
Bye
(Spain) A.F. de Ossó / (Argentina) V. Riera | 3 | 7 | 7
(Spain) A. Blanco / (Spain) B. Caldera | 6 | 6 | 6
(Spain) P. Josemaria / (Argentina) V. Pavón | 6 | 6
Q | (France) A. Collombon / (Spain) S. Pujals | 1 | 3
(Spain) A. Galán / (Spain) M. Villalba | 6 | 5 | 6
(Spain) B. González / (Argentina) C. Tenorio | 0 | 7 | 4
(Spain) C. Navarro / (Argentina) C. Reiter | 6 | 6
(Spain) N. Márquez / (Spain) S. Vidal | 0 | 1
(Spain) C. Mesa / (Spain) L. Martínez | 5 | 6 | 6
(Spain) M. Talaván / (Spain) T. Icardo | 7 | 3 | 4
(Spain) A. Cantin / (Spain) N. Rodriguez | 6 | 6
Q | (Spain) M. Gonzalez / (Brazil) R. Piltcher | 0 | 3
Bye
4 | (Spain) A. Sánchez / (Spain) M. Ortega
3 | (Spain) A. Salazar / (Spain) M. Marrero
Bye
(Spain) A. Medina / (Spain) I. Egaña | 3 | 1
(Portugal) A.C. Nogueira / (Argentina) Delfina | 6 | 6
(Argentina) A. Osoro / (Argentina) N. Brito | 3 | 6 | 6
Q | (Belgium) H. Wyckaert / (Spain) T. Anillo | 6 | 0 | 1
Q | (Spain) C. Argemi / (Spain) N. Rovira | 7 | 4 | 6
(Spain) T. Navarro / (Spain) V. Iglesias | 6 | 6 | 4
(Spain) E. Amatriain / (Spain) P. Llaguno | 6 | 6
(Spain) E. Ramírez / (Spain) R. Aguilar | 2 | 2
(Spain) L. Alonso / (Spain) M. Gabarrus | 7 | 3 | 6
(Spain) I. Domínguez / (Spain) V. Alonso | 5 | 6 | 2
(Spain) M. Truchado / (Portugal) S. Araújo
(Spain) S. Ruiz / (Spain) V. Virseda
Bye
2 | (Spain) Gemma / (Spain) L. Sainz

Round of 16
1 | (Spain) Majo / (Spain) Mapi | 6 | 6
(Spain) A.F. de Ossó / (Argentina) V. Riera | 2 | 2
(Spain) P. Josemaria / (Argentina) V. Pavón | 4 | 3
(Spain) A. Galán / (Spain) M. Villalba | 6 | 6
(Spain) C. Navarro / (Argentina) C. Reiter | 6 | 6
(Spain) C. Mesa / (Spain) L. Martínez | 4 | 3
(Spain) A. Cantin / (Spain) N. Rodriguez | 2 | 4
4 | (Spain) A. Sánchez / (Spain) M. Ortega | 6 | 6
3 | (Spain) A. Salazar / (Spain) M. Marrero | 6 | 7
(Portugal) A.C. Nogueira / (Argentina) Delfina | 4 | 5
(Argentina) A. Osoro / (Argentina) N. Brito | 6 | 7
(Spain) C. Argemi / (Spain) N. Rovira | 2 | 5
(Spain) E. Amatriain / (Spain) P. Llaguno | 6 | 6
(Spain) L. Alonso / (Spain) M. Gabarrus | 3 | 2
(Spain) M. Truchado / (Portugal) S. Araújo | 2 | 1
2 | (Spain) Gemma / (Spain) L. Sainz | 6 | 6

Quarter-Final
1 | (Spain) Majo / (Spain) Mapi | 6 | 6
(Spain) A. Galán / (Spain) M. Villalba | 3 | 3
(Spain) C. Navarro / (Argentina) C. Reiter | 6 | 6
4 | (Spain) A. Sánchez / (Spain) M. Ortega | 3 | 4
3 | (Spain) A. Salazar / (Spain) M. Marrero | 6 | 6
(Argentina) A. Osoro / (Argentina) N. Brito | 1 | 1
(Spain) E. Amatriain / (Spain) P. Llaguno | 6 | 6 | 5
2 | (Spain) Gemma / (Spain) L. Sainz | 0 | 7 | 7

Semi-Finals
1 | (Spain) Majo / (Spain) Mapi | 6 | 6
(Spain) C. Navarro / (Argentina) C. Reiter | 4 | 1
3 | (Spain) A. Salazar / (Spain) M. Marrero | 7 | 5 | 6
2 | (Spain) Gemma / (Spain) L. Sainz | 6 | 7 | 3

Finals
1 | (Spain) Majo / (Spain) Mapi | 7 | 6 | 6
3 | (Spain) A. Salazar / (Spain) M. Marrero | 6 | 7 | 4

== Results ==
=== Round of 32 ===
Men's

| Date | Winners | Score | Opponent | Refs. |
|---|---|---|---|---|
| 22/8/2018 | (Argentina) Agustin Gomez Silingo (Spain) Alejandro Ruiz | 6–4 / 6–7 / 6–4 | (Argentina) Federico Quiles (Brazil) Francisco Gomes | |
| 22/8/2018 | (Spain) Álvaro Cepero (Argentina) Sebastián Nerone | 4–6 / 7–6 / 6–3 | (Uruguay) Diego Ramos (Spain) Rafael Méndez | |
| 22/8/2018 | (Argentina) Juan Cruz Belluati (Spain) Juan Lebrón | 6–2 / 6–1 | (Spain) Jorge Ruiz Gutiérrez (Spain) Miguel Solbes | |
| 22/8/2018 | (Spain) Juani Mieres (Argentina) Miguel Lamperti | 6–1 / 6–4 | (Argentina) Adrián Allemandi (Spain) Javi Garrido | |
| 22/8/2018 | (Brazil) Lucas Bergamini (Brazil) Lucas Campagnolo | 2–2 / W.O. | (Argentina) Aris Patiniotis (Spain) Jordi Muñoz | |
| 22/8/2018 | (Argentina) Maxi Grabiel (Spain) Pablo Lijó | 6–1 / 6–4 | (Spain) José García Diestro (Spain) Martin Sanchez Piñeiro | |
| 22/8/2018 | (Argentina) Matías Nicoletti (Spain) Pedro Alonso Martínez | 6–3 / 7–5 | (Argentina) Denis Perino (Brazil) Lucas Da Cunha | |
| 22/8/2018 | (Spain) Javi Ruiz (Spain) Uri Botello | 6–1 / 6–4 | (Spain) Aday Santana (Spain) Nacho Gadea | |
| 22/8/2018 | (Argentina) Lucho Capra (Argentina) Ramiro Moyano | 5–7 / 6–2 / 6–3 | (Argentina) Germán Tamame (Argentina) Godo Díaz | |
| 22/8/2018 | (Argentina) Cristian Gutiérrez (Argentina) Franco Stupaczuk | 7–6 / 6–1 | (Spain) José Rico (Argentina) Juan Manuel Restivo | |
| 22/8/2018 | (Spain) Coki Nieto (Spain) Javi Rico | 6–4 / 6–2 | (Argentina) Federico Chingotto (Argentina) Fernando Poggi | |
| 22/8/2018 | (Spain) Gonzalo Rubio (Spain) Ernesto Moreno | 6–3 / 6–4 | (Spain) Borja Yribarren (Spain) Willy Lahoz | |

Women's

| Date | Winners | Score | Opponent | Refs. |
|---|---|---|---|---|
| 22/8/2018 | (Spain) Ana Fernández de Ossó (Argentina) Virginia Riera | 3–6 / 7–6 / 7–6 | (Spain) Alicia Blanco Rojo (Spain) Beatriz Caldera | |
| 22/8/2018 | (Spain) Paula Josemaria (Argentina) Valeria Pavón | 6–1 / 6–3 | (France) Alix Collombon (Spain) Sara Pujals | |
| 22/8/2018 | (Spain) Alba Galán (Spain) Maria Villalba | 6–0 / 5–7 / 6–4 | (Spain) Beatriz González (Argentina) Catalina Tenorio | |
| 22/8/2018 | (Spain) Carolina Navarro (Argentina) Cecilia Reiter | 6–0 / 6–1 | (Spain) Noelia Márquez (Spain) Silvia López Vidal | |
| 22/8/2018 | (Spain) Carla Mesa (Spain) Lucía Martínez | 5–7 / 6–3 / 6–4 | (Spain) Marta Talaván (Spain) Tamara Icardo | |
| 22/8/2018 | (Spain) Angela Caro Cantin (Spain) Nuria Rodriguez | 6–0 / 6–3 | (Spain) Marta Gonzalez (Brazil) Raquel Piltcher | |
| 22/8/2018 | (Portugal) Ana Catarina Nogueira (Argentina) Delfina Brea | 6–3 / 6–1 | (Spain) Andrea Medina (Spain) Idoia Martin Egaña | |
| 22/8/2018 | (Argentina) Aranzazu Osoro (Argentina) Nela Brito | 3–6 / 6–0 / 6–1 | (Belgium) Helena Wyckaert (Spain) Teresa Anillo | |
| 22/8/2018 | (Spain) Cristina Gomis Argemi (Spain) Nuria Rovira | 7–6 / 4–6 / 6–4 | (Spain) Teresa Navarro (Spain) Victoria Iglesias | |
| 22/8/2018 | (Spain) Elisabeth Amatriain (Spain) Patricia Llaguno | 6–2 / 6–2 | (Spain) Elena Ramírez (Spain) Raquel Segura Aguilar | |
| 22/8/2018 | (Spain) Lorena Alonso (Spain) Maite Gabarrus | 7–5 / 3–6 / 6–2 | (Spain) Isabel Domínguez (Spain) Vanesa Alonso | |
| 22/8/2018 | (Spain) Meli García Truchado (Portugal) Sofia Araújo | 6–2 / 3–6 / 7–5 | (Spain) Sara Ruiz (Spain) Verónica Virseda | |

=== Round of 16 ===
Men's

| Date | Winners | Score | Opponent | Refs. |
|---|---|---|---|---|
| 23/8/2018 | (Argentina) Maxi Sánchez (Argentina) Sanyo Gutiérrez | 6–3 / 7–6 | (Argentina) Agustin Gomez Silingo (Spain) Alejandro Ruiz | |
| 23/8/2018 | (Argentina) Juan Cruz Belluati (Spain) Juan Lebrón | 4–6 / 6–3 / 6–2 | (Spain) Álvaro Cepero (Argentina) Sebastián Nerone | |
| 23/8/2018 | (Spain) Juani Mieres (Argentina) Miguel Lamperti | 6–4 / 6–2 | (Brazil) Lucas Bergamini (Brazil) Lucas Campagnolo | |
| 23/8/2018 | (Spain) Juan Martin Díaz (Spain) Paquito Navarro | 6–4 / 6–3 | (Argentina) Maxi Grabiel (Spain) Pablo Lijó | |
| 23/8/2018 | (Spain) Alejandro Galán (Spain) Matías Díaz | 7–5 / 6–3 | (Argentina) Matías Nicoletti (Spain) Pedro Alonso Martínez | |
| 23/8/2018 | (Spain) Javi Ruiz (Spain) Uri Botello | 7–6 / 6–3 | (Argentina) Lucho Capra (Argentina) Ramiro Moyano | |
| 23/8/2018 | (Argentina) Cristian Gutiérrez (Argentina) Franco Stupaczuk | 6–3 / 6–2 | (Spain) Coki Nieto (Spain) Javi Rico | |
| 23/8/2018 | (Brazil) Marcello Jardim (Brazil) Pablo Lima | 5–7 / 6–4 / 7–6 | (Spain) Gonzalo Rubio (Spain) Ernesto Moreno | |

Women's

| Date | Winners | Score | Opponent | Refs. |
|---|---|---|---|---|
| 23/8/2018 | (Spain) Majo Sanchez (Spain) Mapi Sanchez | 6–2 / 6–2 | (Spain) Ana Fernández de Ossó (Argentina) Virginia Riera | |
| 23/8/2018 | (Spain) Alba Galán (Spain) Maria Villalba | 6–4 / 6–3 | (Spain) Paula Josemaria (Argentina) Valeria Pavón | |
| 23/8/2018 | (Spain) Carolina Navarro (Argentina) Cecilia Reiter | 6–4 / 6–3 | (Spain) Carla Mesa (Spain) Lucía Martínez | |
| 23/8/2018 | (Spain) Ariana Sánchez (Spain) Marta Ortega | 6–2 / 6–4 | (Spain) Angela Caro Cantin (Spain) Nuria Rodriguez | |
| 23/8/2018 | (Spain) Alejandra Salazar (Spain) Marta Marrero | 6–4 / 7–5 | (Portugal) Ana Catarina Nogueira (Argentina) Delfina Brea | |
| 23/8/2018 | (Argentina) Aranzazu Osoro (Argentina) Nela Brito | 6–2 / 7–5 | (Spain) Cristina Gomis Argemi (Spain) Nuria Rovira | |
| 23/8/2018 | (Spain) Elisabeth Amatriain (Spain) Patricia Llaguno | 6–3 / 6–2 | (Spain) Lorena Alonso (Spain) Maite Gabarrus | |
| 23/8/2018 | (Spain) Gemma Triay (Spain) Lucía Sainz | 6–2 / 6–1 | (Spain) Meli García Truchado (Portugal) Sofia Araújo | |

=== Quarter-Finals ===
Men's

| Date | Winners | Score | Opponent | Refs. |
|---|---|---|---|---|
| 24/8/2018 | (Argentina) Maxi Sánchez (Argentina) Sanyo Gutiérrez | 7–6 / 6–4 | (Argentina) Juan Cruz Belluati (Spain) Juan Lebrón | |
| 24/8/2018 | (Spain) Juan Martin Díaz (Spain) Paquito Navarro | 6–1 / 6–4 | (Spain) Juani Mieres (Argentina) Miguel Lamperti | |
| 24/8/2018 | (Spain) Alejandro Galán (Spain) Matías Díaz | 6–4 / 7–6 | (Spain) Javi Ruiz (Spain) Uri Botello | |
| 24/8/2018 | (Argentina) Cristian Gutiérrez (Argentina) Franco Stupaczuk | 6–4 / 6–3 | (Brazil) Marcello Jardim (Brazil) Pablo Lima | |

Women's

| Date | Winners | Score | Opponent | Refs. |
|---|---|---|---|---|
| 24/8/2018 | (Spain) Majo Sanchez (Spain) Mapi Sanchez | 6–3 / 6–3 | (Spain) Alba Galán (Spain) Maria Villalba | |
| 24/8/2018 | (Spain) Carolina Navarro (Argentina) Cecilia Reiter | 6–3 / 6–4 | (Spain) Ariana Sánchez (Spain) Marta Ortega | |
| 24/8/2018 | (Spain) Alejandra Salazar (Spain) Marta Marrero | 6–1 / 6–1 | (Argentina) Aranzazu Osoro (Argentina) Nela Brito | |
| 24/8/2018 | (Spain) Gemma Triay (Spain) Lucía Sainz | 0–6 / 7–6 / 7–5 | (Spain) Elisabeth Amatriain (Spain) Patricia Llaguno | |

=== Semi-Finals ===
Men's

| Date | Winners | Score | Opponent | Refs. |
|---|---|---|---|---|
| 25/8/2018 | (Argentina) Maxi Sánchez (Argentina) Sanyo Gutiérrez | 7–6 / 6–7 / 6–4 | (Spain) Juan Martin Díaz (Spain) Paquito Navarro | |
| 25/8/2018 | (Argentina) Cristian Gutiérrez (Argentina) Franco Stupaczuk | 2–6 / 6–4 / 7–5 | (Spain) Alejandro Galán (Spain) Matías Díaz | |

Women's

| Date | Winners | Score | Opponent | Refs. |
|---|---|---|---|---|
| 25/8/2018 | (Spain) Majo Sanchez (Spain) Mapi Sanchez | 6–4 / 6–1 | (Spain) Carolina Navarro (Argentina) Cecilia Reiter | |
| 25/8/2018 | (Spain) Alejandra Salazar (Spain) Marta Marrero | 7–6 / 5–7 / 6–3 | (Spain) Gemma Triay (Spain) Lucía Sainz | |

=== Finals ===
Men's

| Date | Winners | Score | Opponent | Refs. |
|---|---|---|---|---|
| 26/8/2018 | (Argentina) Maxi Sánchez (Argentina) Sanyo Gutiérrez | 5–7 / 6–4 / 6–4 | (Argentina) Cristian Gutiérrez (Argentina) Franco Stupaczuk | |

Women's

| Date | Winners | Score | Opponent | Refs. |
|---|---|---|---|---|
| 26/8/2018 | (Spain) Majo Sanchez (Spain) Mapi Sanchez | 7–6 / 6–7 / 6–4 | (Spain) Alejandra Salazar (Spain) Marta Marrero | |
