= 2018 WPT Euskadi Open =

World Padel Tour tournament held in Bilbao, Spain

- Date: 21 – 28 October
- Edition: 19th (Note: The first fourteen editions were held under the organization of the Padel Pro Tour, with the first held in Getxo, and the 3rd, 6th, 9th, 10th, 16th and 17th held in San Sebastián.)
- Category: Open
- Location: Bilbao, Spain
- Venue: Bilbao Arena

Champions
- Men's doubles: (Brazil) Pablo Lima (Spain) Paquito Navarro
- Women's doubles: (Spain) Alejandra Salazar (Spain) Marta Marrero

Chronology
Previous
Granada Open
Next
World Pairs Cup
(FIP)

The 2018 Euskadi Open (officially 2018 World Padel Tour Bilbao Open) was the fourteenth tournament of the sixth season organized by World Padel Tour, the most prestigious padel circuit at the time.

In the women's category, for the fifth time this season, the world's number 1 and number 3 ranked pairs reached the final. In the decisive match, Alejandra Salazar and Marta Marrero defeated the twins Majo and Mapi Sánchez in three sets, securing their fourth title of the season and reclaiming the title they had first won in 2016.

In the men’s category, Pablo Lima and Paquito Navarro, the world’s number two-ranked pair, reached the final, where they faced the veteran duo of Juani Mieres and Miguel Lamperti. In the battle for the title, Lima and Paquito defeated Lamperti and Mieres in straight sets, securing their first title as a pair in their debut tournament together. This victory earned Paquito his first title of the season and his first in the Basque Country (marking the third time Lima has won there after winning it in 2015 and 2016).

== Head-to-head record between teams ranked in the top 4 during the season ==
=== Men's ===
Record	Maxi–Sanyo	Lima–Paquito Navarro	Galán–M. Díaz	Gutiérrez–Stupaczuk	Former Pairs	J.M. Díaz–Paquito	Belasteguín–Lima	Lima–M. Jardim	Lima–Silingo
Maxi–Sanyo	—	—	2–3	3–2		4–0	0–1	—	—
Lima–Paquito	—	—	—	1–0		—	—	—	—
Galán–M. Díaz	3–2	—	—	2–2		1–2	0–1	—	—
Gutiérrez–Stupaczuk	2–3	0–1	2–2	—		—	0–1	1–0	—
Former Pairs									
J.M. Díaz–Paquito	0–4	—	2–1	—		—	0–2	—	—
Belasteguín–Lima	1–0	—	1–0	1–0		2–0	—	—	—
Lima–M. Jardim	—	—	—	0–1		—	—	—	—
Lima–Silingo	—	—	—	—		—	—	—	—

=== Women's ===
Record	Majo–Mapi	Marrero–Salazar	Triay–Sainz	Ariana–Ortega	Former Pairs	Amatriain–Llaguno
Majo–Mapi	—	3–4	3–3	4–1		6–0
Marrero–Salazar	4–3	—	4–5	2–0		1–0
Triay–Sainz	3–3	5–4	—	2–0		2–1
Ariana–Ortega	1–4	0–2	0–2	—		3–1
Former Pairs						
Amatriain–Llaguno	0–6	0–1	1–2	1–3		—

== Draws ==
=== Men's Bracket ===
Round of 32
1	(Argentina) Maxi / (Argentina) Sanyo
Bye
(Spain) B. Yribarren / (Argentina) J. Restivo	6	0
(Spain) Á. Cepero / (Argentina) S. Nerone	7	6
Q	(Argentina) F. Chingotto / (Argentina) J. Tello	4	6	3
(Argentina) A. Allemandi / (Argentina) A. Silingo	6	2	6
(Uruguay) D. Ramos / (Spain) R. Méndez	4	4
(Spain) J. Ruiz / (Spain) U. Botello	6	6
(Spain) J. Mieres / (Argentina) M. Lamperti	6	6
(Spain) J. Rico / (Spain) V. Ruiz	4	2
Q	(Spain) C. Fuster / (Spain) R. Marcos	4	5
(Spain) J.G. Diestro / (Spain) M. Piñeiro	6	7
(Argentina) G. Tamame / (Spain) N. Gadea	6	7
(Spain) A. Santana / (Argentina) Godo Díaz	4	5
Bye
3	(Spain) Galán / (Spain) M. Díaz
4	(Argentina) C. Gutiérrez / (Argentina) Stupaczuk
Bye
(Spain) J. Muñoz / (Spain) W. Lahoz	2	1
(Argentina) M. Nicoletti / (Spain) P.A. Martínez	6	6
Q	(Argentina) G. Reca / (Spain) Momo	2	4
(Brazil) L. Bergamini / (Brazil) L. Campagnolo	6	6
(Spain) A. Ruiz / (Spain) J. Garrido	2	4
(Argentina) J.C. Belluati / (Spain) P. Lijó	6	6
(Spain) J.M. Díaz / (Spain) Lebrón	6	6
(Spain) G. Rubio / (Spain) E. Moreno	0	4
(Spain) Coki / (Spain) J. Rico	2	3
(Argentina) L. Capra / (Argentina) R. Moyano	6	6
(Argentina) F. Quiles / (Argentina) M. Grabiel	5	6	6
(Argentina) F. Poggi / (Brazil) M. Jardim	7	3	4
Bye
2	(Brazil) Lima / (Spain) Paquito

Round of 16
1	(Argentina) Maxi / (Argentina) Sanyo	6	6
(Spain) Á. Cepero / (Argentina) S. Nerone	2	0
(Argentina) A. Allemandi / (Argentina) A. Silingo	3	5
(Spain) J. Ruiz / (Spain) U. Botello	6	7
(Spain) J. Mieres / (Argentina) M. Lamperti	6	6
(Spain) J.G. Diestro / (Spain) M. Piñeiro	1	2
(Argentina) G. Tamame / (Spain) N. Gadea	4	5
3	(Spain) Galán / (Spain) M. Díaz	6	7
4	(Argentina) C. Gutiérrez / (Argentina) Stupaczuk	6	6
(Argentina) M. Nicoletti / (Spain) P.A. Martínez	0	1
(Brazil) L. Bergamini / (Brazil) L. Campagnolo	7	6
(Spain) J.C. Belluati / (Spain) P. Lijó	5	1
(Spain) J.M. Díaz / (Spain) Lebrón	6	6
(Argentina) L. Capra / (Argentina) R. Moyano	2	2
(Argentina) F. Quiles / (Argentina) M. Grabiel	1	3
2	(Brazil) Lima / (Spain) Paquito	6	6

Quarter-Final
1	(Argentina) Maxi / (Argentina) Sanyo	6	6	2
(Spain) J. Ruiz / (Spain) U. Botello	4	7	6
(Spain) J. Mieres / (Argentina) M. Lamperti	4	6	6
3	(Spain) Galán / (Spain) M. Díaz	6	3	4
4	(Argentina) C. Gutiérrez / (Argentina) Stupaczuk	6	7
(Brazil) L. Bergamini / (Brazil) L. Campagnolo	4	6
(Spain) J.M. Díaz / (Spain) Lebrón	3	1
2	(Brazil) Lima / (Spain) Paquito	6	6

Semi-Finals
(Spain) J. Ruiz / (Spain) U. Botello	6	2	1
(Spain) J. Mieres / (Argentina) M. Lamperti	3	6	6
4	(Argentina) C. Gutiérrez / (Argentina) Stupaczuk	1	6
2	(Brazil) Lima / (Spain) Paquito	6	7

Finals
(Spain) J. Mieres / (Argentina) M. Lamperti	3	3
2	(Brazil) Lima / (Spain) Paquito	6	6

=== Women's Bracket ===
Round of 32
1	(Spain) Majo / (Spain) Mapi
Bye
(Spain) S. Hernández / (Spain) V. Virseda	7	6
(Spain) P. Josemaria / (Argentina) V. Pavón	6	3
(Argentina) A. Osoro / (Argentina) N. Brito	6	6
Q	(Venezuela) A. Seijas Cali / (Portugal) F. Mendonça	4	1
(Spain) L. Alonso / (Spain) M. Gabarrus	4	6
(Spain) B. González / (Argentina) C. Tenorio	6	7
(Spain) E. Amatriain / (Spain) P. Llaguno	6	6
Q	(Spain) N. Traviesa / (Brazil) R. Piltcher	0	2
(Spain) C. Goenaga / (Spain) E. Fernández	2	0
(Portugal) A.C. Nogueira / (Argentina) Delfina	6	6
(Spain) A.F. de Ossó / (Argentina) V. Riera	6	6
(Spain) A. Blanco / (Spain) B. Caldera	3	2
Bye
4	(Spain) A. Sánchez / (Spain) M. Ortega
3	(Spain) A. Salazar / (Spain) M. Marrero
Bye
Q	(Spain) L. Torres / (Spain) X. Clasca	6	6
(Spain) M. Truchado / (Portugal) S. Araújo	1	2
(Spain) A. Galán / (Spain) M. Villalba	6	6
(Spain) A. Cantin / (Spain) N. Rodriguez	1	2
(France) A. Collombon / (Spain) S. Pujals	4	2
(Spain) T. Navarro / (Spain) V. Iglesias	6	6
(Spain) C. Navarro / (Argentina) C. Reiter	6	7
(Spain) I. Domínguez / (Spain) V. Alonso	3	6
(Spain) A. Martinez / (Spain) M. Talavan	2	4
(Spain) C. Mesa / (Spain) L. Martínez	6	6
(Spain) E. Ramírez / (Spain) R. Aguilar	1	0
(Spain) T. Icardo / (Spain) S. Ruiz	6	6
Bye
2	(Spain) Gemma / (Spain) L. Sainz

Round of 16
1	(Spain) Majo / (Spain) Mapi	6	6
(Spain) S. Hernández / (Spain) V. Virseda	1	1
(Argentina) A. Osoro / (Argentina) N. Brito	6	4	7
(Spain) B. González / (Argentina) C. Tenorio	3	6	6
(Spain) E. Amatriain / (Spain) P. Llaguno	6	6
(Portugal) A.C. Nogueira / (Argentina) Delfina	4	0
(Spain) A.F. de Ossó / (Argentina) V. Riera	3	3
4	(Spain) A. Sánchez / (Spain) M. Ortega	6	6
3	(Spain) A. Salazar / (Spain) M. Marrero	6	6
(Spain) L. Torres / (Spain) X. Clasca	1	0
(Spain) A. Galán / (Spain) M. Villalba	6	3	6
(Spain) T. Navarro / (Spain) V. Iglesias	3	6	4
(Spain) C. Navarro / (Argentina) C. Reiter	6	6
(Spain) C. Mesa / (Spain) L. Martínez	3	4
(Spain) T. Icardo / (Spain) S. Ruiz	1	1
2	(Spain) Gemma / (Spain) L. Sainz	6	6

Quarter-Final
1	(Spain) Majo / (Spain) Mapi	6	6
(Argentina) A. Osoro / (Argentina) N. Brito	1	2
(Spain) E. Amatriain / (Spain) P. Llaguno	3	4
4	(Spain) A. Sánchez / (Spain) M. Ortega	6	6
3	(Spain) A. Salazar / (Spain) M. Marrero	6	7
(Spain) A. Galán / (Spain) M. Villalba	1	5
(Spain) C. Navarro / (Argentina) C. Reiter	2	4
2	(Spain) Gemma / (Spain) L. Sainz	6	6

Semi-Finals
1	(Spain) Majo / (Spain) Mapi	6	6
4	(Spain) A. Sánchez / (Spain) M. Ortega	3	1
3	(Spain) A. Salazar / (Spain) M. Marrero	6	6
2	(Spain) Gemma / (Spain) L. Sainz	2	2

Finals
1	(Spain) Majo / (Spain) Mapi	3	6	4
3	(Spain) A. Salazar / (Spain) M. Marrero	6	2	6

== Results ==
=== Round of 32 ===
Men's
Date	Winners	Score	Opponent	Ref.
24/10/2018	(Spain) Álvaro Cepero (Argentina) Sebastián Nerone	7–6 / 6–0	(Spain) Borja Yribarren (Argentina) Juan Manuel Restivo	
24/10/2018	(Argentina) Agustin Goméz Silingo (Argentina) Adrián Allemandi	6–4 / 2–6 / 6–3	(Argentina) Federico Chingotto (Argentina) Juan Tello	
24/10/2018	(Spain) Javi Ruiz (Spain) Uri Botello	6–4 / 6–4	(Uruguay) Diego Ramos (Spain) Rafael Méndez	
24/10/2018	(Spain) Juani Mieres (Argentina) Miguel Lamperti	6–4 / 6–2	(Spain) José Rico (Spain) Víctor Ruiz	
24/10/2018	(Spain) José García Diestro (Spain) Martin Sanchez Piñeiro	6–4 / 7–5	(Spain) Christian Fuster (Spain) Raúl Marcos Durán	
24/10/2018	(Argentina) Germán Tamame (Spain) Nacho Gadea	6–4 / 7–5	(Spain) Aday Santana (Argentina) Godo Díaz	
24/10/2018	(Argentina) Matías Nicoletti (Spain) Pedro Alonso Martínez	6–2 / 6–1	(Spain) Jordi Muñoz (Spain) Willy Lahoz	
24/10/2018	(Brazil) Lucas Bergamini (Brazil) Lucas Campagnolo	6–2 / 6–4	(Argentina) Gaby Reca (Spain) Momo González	
24/10/2018	(Argentina) Juan Cruz Belluati (Spain) Pablo Lijó	6–2 / 6–4	(Spain) Alejandro Ruiz (Spain) Javi Garrido	
24/10/2018	(Spain) Juan Lebrón (Spain) Juan Martin Díaz	6–0 / 6–4	(Spain) Gonzalo Rubio (Spain) Ernesto Moreno	
24/10/2018	(Argentina) Lucho Capra (Argentina) Ramiro Moyano	6–2 / 6–3	(Spain) Coki Nieto (Spain) Javi Rico	
24/10/2018	(Argentina) Federico Quiles (Argentina) Maxi Grabiel	5–7 / 6–3 / 6–4	(Argentina) Fernando Poggi (Brazil) Marcelo Jardim	

Women's
Date	Winners	Score	Opponent	Ref.
24/10/2018	(Spain) Sandra Hernández (Spain) Verónica Virseda	7–6 / 6–3	(Spain) Paula Josemaria (Argentina) Valeria Pavón	
24/10/2018	(Argentina) Aranzazu Osoro (Argentina) Nela Brito	6–4 / 6–1	(Venezuela) Ana Seijas Cali (Portugal) Filipa Mendonça	
24/10/2018	(Spain) Beatriz González (Argentina) Catalina Tenorio	6–4 / 7–6	(Spain) Lorena Alonso (Spain) Maite Gabarrus	
24/10/2018	(Spain) Elisabeth Amatriain (Spain) Patricia Llaguno	6–0 / 6–2	(Spain) Nicole Traviesa Mola (Brazil) Raquel Piltcher	
24/10/2018	(Portugal) Ana Catarina Nogueira (Argentina) Delfina Brea	6–2 / 6–0	(Spain) Carmen Goenaga (Spain) Estela Frances Fernández	
24/10/2018	(Spain) Ana Fernández de Ossó (Argentina) Virginia Riera	6–3 / 6–2	(Spain) Alicia Blanco Rojo (Spain) Beatriz Caldera	
24/10/2018	(Spain) Laia Bonilla Torres (Spain) Xenia Clasca	6–1 / 6–2	(Spain) Meli García Truchado (Portugal) Sofia Araújo	
24/10/2018	(Spain) Alba Galán (Spain) Maria Villalba	6–1 / 6–2	(Spain) Angela Caro Cantin (Spain) Nuria Rodriguez	
24/10/2018	(Spain) Teresa Navarro (Spain) Victoria Iglesias	6–4 / 6–2	(France) Alix Collombon (Spain) Sara Pujals	
24/10/2018	(Spain) Carolina Navarro (Argentina) Cecilia Reiter	6–3 / 7–6	(Spain) Isabel Domínguez (Spain) Vanesa Alonso	
24/10/2018	(Spain) Carla Mesa (Spain) Lucía Martínez	6–2 / 6–4	(Spain) Araceli Martinez (Spain) Marta Talavan	
24/10/2018	(Spain) Sara Ruiz (Spain) Tamara Icardo	6–1 / 6–0	(Spain) Elena Ramírez (Spain) Raquel Segura Aguilar	

=== Round of 16 ===
Men's
Date	Winners	Score	Opponent	Ref.
25/10/2018	(Argentina) Maxi Sánchez (Argentina) Sanyo Gutiérrez	6–2 / 6–0	(Spain) Álvaro Cepero (Argentina) Sebastián Nerone	
25/10/2018	(Spain) Javi Ruiz (Spain) Uri Botello	6–3 / 7–5	(Argentina) Agustin Goméz Silingo (Argentina) Adrián Allemandi	
25/10/2018	(Spain) Juani Mieres (Argentina) Miguel Lamperti	6–1 / 6–2	(Spain) José García Diestro (Spain) Martin Sanchez Piñeiro	
25/10/2018	(Spain) Alejandro Galán (Spain) Matías Díaz	6–4 / 7–5	(Argentina) Germán Tamame (Spain) Nacho Gadea	
25/10/2018	(Argentina) Cristian Gutiérrez (Argentina) Franco Stupaczuk	6–0 / 6–1	(Argentina) Matías Nicoletti (Spain) Pedro Alonso Martínez	
25/10/2018	(Brazil) Lucas Bergamini (Brazil) Lucas Campagnolo	7–5 / 6–1	(Argentina) Juan Cruz Belluati (Spain) Pablo Lijó	
25/10/2018	(Spain) Juan Lebrón (Spain) Juan Martin Díaz	6–2 / 6–2	(Argentina) Lucho Capra (Argentina) Ramiro Moyano	
25/10/2018	(Brazil) Pablo Lima (Spain) Paquito Navarro	6–1 / 6–3	(Argentina) Federico Quiles (Argentina) Maxi Grabiel	

Women's
Date	Winners	Score	Opponent	Ref.
25/10/2018	(Spain) Majo Sánchez (Spain) Mapi Sánchez	6–1 / 6–1	(Spain) Sandra Hernández (Spain) Verónica Virseda	
25/10/2018	(Argentina) Aranzazu Osoro (Argentina) Nela Brito	6–3 / 4–6 / 7–6	(Spain) Beatriz González (Argentina) Catalina Tenorio	
25/10/2018	(Spain) Elisabeth Amatriain (Spain) Patricia Llaguno	6–4 / 6–0	(Portugal) Ana Catarina Nogueira (Argentina) Delfina Brea	
25/10/2018	(Spain) Ariana Sánchez (Spain) Marta Ortega	6–3 / 6–3	(Spain) Ana Fernández de Ossó (Argentina) Virginia Riera	
25/10/2018	(Spain) Alejandra Salazar (Spain) Marta Marrero	6–1 / 6–0	(Spain) Laia Bonilla Torres (Spain) Xenia Clasca	
25/10/2018	(Spain) Alba Galán (Spain) Maria Villalba	6–3 / 3–6 / 6–4	(Spain) Teresa Navarro (Spain) Victoria Iglesias	
25/10/2018	(Spain) Carolina Navarro (Argentina) Cecilia Reiter	6–3 / 6–4	(Spain) Carla Mesa (Spain) Lucía Martínez	
25/10/2018	(Spain) Gemma Triay (Spain) Lucía Sainz	6–1 / 6–1	(Spain) Sara Ruiz (Spain) Tamara Icardo	

=== Quarter-Finals ===
Men's
Date	Winners	Score	Opponent	Ref.
26/10/2018	(Spain) Javi Ruiz (Spain) Uri Botello	4–6 / 7–6 / 6–2	(Argentina) Maxi Sánchez (Argentina) Sanyo Gutiérrez	
26/10/2018	(Spain) Juani Mieres (Argentina) Miguel Lamperti	4–6 / 6–3 / 6–4	(Spain) Alejandro Galán (Spain) Matías Díaz	
26/10/2018	(Argentina) Cristian Gutiérrez (Argentina) Franco Stupaczuk	6–4 / 7–6	(Brazil) Lucas Bergamini (Brazil) Lucas Campagnolo	
26/10/2018	(Brazil) Pablo Lima (Spain) Paquito Navarro	6–3 / 6–1	(Spain) Juan Lebrón (Spain) Juan Martin Díaz	

Women's
Date	Winners	Score	Opponent	Ref.
26/10/2018	(Spain) Majo Sánchez (Spain) Mapi Sánchez	6–1 / 6–2	(Argentina) Aranzazu Osoro (Argentina) Nela Brito	
26/10/2018	(Spain) Ariana Sánchez (Spain) Marta Ortega	6–3 / 6–4	(Spain) Elisabeth Amatriain (Spain) Patricia Llaguno	
26/10/2018	(Spain) Alejandra Salazar (Spain) Marta Marrero	6–1 / 7–5	(Spain) Alba Galán (Spain) Maria Villalba	
26/10/2018	(Spain) Gemma Triay (Spain) Lucía Sainz	6–2 / 6–4	(Spain) Carolina Navarro (Argentina) Cecilia Reiter	

=== Semi-Finals ===
Men's
Date	Winners	Score	Opponent	Ref.
27/10/2018	(Spain) Juani Mieres (Argentina) Miguel Lamperti	3–6 / 6–2 / 6–1	(Spain) Javi Ruiz (Spain) Uri Botello	
27/10/2018	(Brazil) Pablo Lima (Spain) Paquito Navarro	6–1 / 7–6	(Argentina) Cristian Gutiérrez (Argentina) Franco Stupaczuk	

Women's
Date	Winners	Score	Opponent	Ref.
27/10/2018	(Spain) Majo Sánchez (Spain) Mapi Sánchez	6–3 / 6–1	(Spain) Ariana Sánchez (Spain) Marta Ortega	
27/10/2018	(Spain) Alejandra Salazar (Spain) Marta Marrero	6–2 / 6–2	(Spain) Gemma Triay (Spain) Lucía Sainz	

=== Finals ===
Men's
Date	Winners	Score	Opponent	Ref.
28/10/2018	(Brazil) Pablo Lima (Spain) Paquito Navarro	6–3 / 6–3	(Spain) Juani Mieres (Argentina) Miguel Lamperti	

Women's
Date	Winners	Score	Opponent	Ref.
28/10/2018	(Spain) Alejandra Salazar (Spain) Marta Marrero	6–3 / 2–6 / 6–4	(Spain) Majo Sánchez (Spain) Mapi Sánchez	
