= 2018 WPT Madrid WOpen =

World Padel Tour tournament held in Madrid, Spain

- Date: 24 – 30 September
- Edition: 1st
- Category: WOpen
- Location: Madrid, Spain
- Venue: Reebok Sports Club La Finca

Champions
- Women's doubles: (Spain) Alejandra Salazar (Spain) Marta Marrero

Chronology

The 2018 Madrid WOpen (officially 2018 World Padel Tour Madrid WOpen) was the twelfth tournament, and the first-ever exclusively women's event, of the sixth season organized by World Padel Tour, the most prestigious padel circuit at the time.

In the women's category, twins Majo and Mapi Sánchez reached their tenth consecutive final (out of eleven possible), where they faced the world's number three-ranked pair, Alejandra Salazar and Marta Marrero, marking the fourth time the two pairs had met in a final. In the battle for the title, Marrero and Salazar managed to defeat the Sánchez twins, who lead the world rankings, in three sets, securing their third title of the season and becoming the inaugural winners of a WOpen tournament.

== Head-to-head record between teams ranked in the top 4 during the season ==
=== Women's ===
Record	Majo–Mapi	Marrero–Salazar	Triay–Sainz	Ariana–Ortega	Former Pairs	Amatriain–Llaguno
Majo–Mapi	—	3–3	3–3	3–0		6–0
Marrero–Salazar	3–3	—	3–4	2–0		1–0
Triay–Sainz	3–3	4–3	—	1–0		2–1
Ariana–Ortega	0–3	0–2	0–1	—		2–1
Former Pairs						
Amatriain–Llaguno	0–6	0–1	1–2	1–2		—

== Draws ==
Round of 32
1	(Spain) Majo / (Spain) Mapi
Bye
(Spain) M. Truchado / (Portugal) S. Araújo
(Spain) A. Galán / (Spain) M. Villalba
Q	(Spain) E. Carnicero / (Spain) M. Merino	0	0
(Argentina) A. Osoro / (Argentina) N. Brito	6	6
(France) A. Collombon / (Spain) S. Pujals	1	1
(Spain) T. Navarro / (Spain) V. Iglesias	6	6
(Spain) C. Navarro / (Argentina) C. Reiter	7	6
(Spain) A.F. de Ossó / (Argentina) V. Riera	6	1
(France) L. Clergue / (Spain) S. Ruiz	2	3
(Spain) E. Ramírez / (Spain) R. Aguilar	6	6
(Spain) M. Talaván / (Spain) T. Icardo	1	4
(Spain) S. Hernández / (Spain) V. Virseda	6	6
Bye
4	(Spain) A. Sánchez / (Spain) M. Ortega
3	(Spain) A. Salazar / (Spain) M. Marrero
Bye
(Spain) I. Domínguez / (Spain) V. Alonso	3	6	6
Q	(Spain) A. Tapia / (Spain) J. Castelló	6	2	3
(Portugal) A.C. Nogueira / (Argentina) Delfina	6	4
(Spain) C. Mesa / (Spain) L. Martínez	7	6
Q	(Venezuela) A. Seijas Cali / (Spain) L. Torres	0	2
(Spain) B. González / (Argentina) C. Tenorio	6	6
(Spain) E. Amatriain / (Spain) P. Llaguno	6	6
(Spain) P. Josemaria / (Argentina) V. Pavón	0	2
(Spain) A. Cantin / (Spain) N. Rodriguez	1	3
Q	(Argentina) A. Berl / (Spain) A. Martinez	6	6
(Spain) A. Blanco / (Spain) B. Caldera	6	3	5
(Spain) L. Alonso / (Spain) M. Gabarrus	3	6	1
Bye
2	(Spain) Gemma / (Spain) L. Sainz

Round of 16
1	(Spain) Majo / (Spain) Mapi	6	6
(Spain) A. Galán / (Spain) M. Villalba	2	2
(Argentina) A. Osoro / (Argentina) N. Brito	5	2
(Spain) T. Navarro / (Spain) V. Iglesias	7	6
(Spain) C. Navarro / (Argentina) C. Reiter	6	6
(Spain) E. Ramírez / (Spain) R. Aguilar	3	1
(Spain) S. Hernández / (Spain) V. Virseda	3	1
4	(Spain) A. Sánchez / (Spain) M. Ortega	6	6
3	(Spain) A. Salazar / (Spain) M. Marrero	6	6
(Spain) I. Domínguez / (Spain) V. Alonso	1	1
(Spain) C. Mesa / (Spain) L. Martínez	6	5	2
(Spain) B. González / (Argentina) C. Tenorio	1	7	6
(Spain) E. Amatriain / (Spain) P. Llaguno	6	6
(Argentina) A. Berl / (Spain) A. Martinez	0	1
(Spain) A. Blanco / (Spain) B. Caldera	1	2
2	(Spain) Gemma / (Spain) L. Sainz	6	6

Quarter-Final
1	(Spain) Majo / (Spain) Mapi	6	6
(Spain) T. Navarro / (Spain) V. Iglesias	1	0
(Spain) C. Navarro / (Argentina) C. Reiter	6	6
4	(Spain) A. Sánchez / (Spain) M. Ortega	4	4
3	(Spain) A. Salazar / (Spain) M. Marrero	6	6
(Spain) B. González / (Argentina) C. Tenorio	3	1
(Spain) E. Amatriain / (Spain) P. Llaguno	6	7	3
2	(Spain) Gemma / (Spain) L. Sainz	7	6	6

Semi-Finals
1	(Spain) Majo / (Spain) Mapi	6	6
(Spain) C. Navarro / (Argentina) C. Reiter	2	1
3	(Spain) A. Salazar / (Spain) M. Marrero	7	3	6
2	(Spain) Gemma / (Spain) L. Sainz	6	6	2

Finals
1	(Spain) Majo / (Spain) Mapi	2	6	4
3	(Spain) A. Salazar / (Spain) M. Marrero	6	4	6

== Results ==
=== Round of 32 ===
Date	Winners	Score	Opponent	Refs.
26/9/2018	(Spain) Alba Galán (Spain) Maria Villalba	6–3 / 4–6 / 6–1	(Spain) Meli García Truchado (Portugal) Sofia Araújo	
26/9/2018	(Argentina) Aranzazu Osoro (Argentina) Nela Brito	6–0 / 6–0	(Spain) Esther Carnicero (Spain) Melania Merino	
26/9/2018	(Spain) Teresa Navarro (Spain) Victoria Iglesias	6–1 / 6–1	(France) Alix Collombon (Spain) Sara Pujals	
26/9/2018	(Spain) Carolina Navarro (Argentina) Cecilia Reiter	7–6 / 6–1	(Spain) Ana Fernández de Ossó (Argentina) Virginia Riera	
26/9/2018	(Spain) Elena Ramírez (Spain) Raquel Segura Aguilar	6–2 / 6–3	(France) Laura Clergue (Spain) Sara Ruiz	
26/9/2018	(Spain) Sandra Hernández (Spain) Verónica Virseda	6–1 / 6–4	(Spain) Marta Talaván (Spain) Tamara Icardo	
26/9/2018	(Spain) Isabel Domínguez (Spain) Vanesa Alonso	3–6 / 6–2 / 6–3	(Spain) Anna Cortiles Tapia (Spain) Jessica Castelló	
26/9/2018	(Spain) Carla Mesa (Spain) Lucía Martínez	7–6 / 6–4	(Portugal) Ana Catarina Nogueira (Argentina) Delfina Brea	
26/9/2018	(Spain) Beatriz González (Argentina) Catalina Tenorio	6–0 / 6–2	(Venezuela) Ana Seijas Cali (Spain) Laia Torres	
26/9/2018	(Spain) Elisabeth Amatriain (Spain) Patricia Llaguno	6–0 / 6–2	(Spain) Paula Josemaria (Argentina) Valeria Pavón	
26/9/2018	(Argentina) Alicia Lilian Berl (Spain) Araceli Martinez	6–1 / 6–3	(Spain) Angela Caro Cantin (Spain) Nuria Rodriguez	
26/9/2018	(Spain) Alicia Blanco Rojo (Spain) Beatriz Caldera	6–3 / 3–6 / 6–1	(Spain) Lorena Alonso (Spain) Maite Gabarrus	

=== Round of 16 ===
Date	Winners	Score	Opponent	Refs.
27/9/2018	(Spain) Majo Sánchez (Spain) Mapi Sánchez	6–2 / 6–2	(Spain) Alba Galán (Spain) Maria Villalba	
27/9/2018	(Spain) Teresa Navarro (Spain) Victoria Iglesias	7–5 / 6–2	(Argentina) Aranzazu Osoro (Argentina) Nela Brito	
27/9/2018	(Spain) Carolina Navarro (Argentina) Cecilia Reiter	6–3 / 6–4	(Spain) Elena Ramírez (Spain) Raquel Segura Aguilar	
27/9/2018	(Spain) Ariana Sánchez (Spain) Marta Ortega	6–3 / 6–1	(Spain) Sandra Hernández (Spain) Verónica Virseda	
27/9/2018	(Spain) Alejandra Salazar (Spain) Marta Marrero	6–1 / 6–1	(Spain) Isabel Domínguez (Spain) Vanesa Alonso	
27/9/2018	(Spain) Beatriz González (Argentina) Catalina Tenorio	1–6 / 7–5 / 6–2	(Spain) Carla Mesa (Spain) Lucía Martínez	
27/9/2018	(Spain) Elisabeth Amatriain (Spain) Patricia Llaguno	6–0 / 6–1	(Argentina) Alicia Lilian Berl (Spain) Araceli Martinez	
27/9/2018	(Spain) Gemma Triay (Spain) Lucía Sainz	6–1 / 6–2	(Spain) Alicia Blanco Rojo (Spain) Beatriz Caldera	

=== Quarter-Finals ===
Date	Winners	Score	Opponent	Refs.
28/9/2018	(Spain) Majo Sanchez (Spain) Mapi Sanchez	6–1 / 6–0	(Spain) Teresa Navarro (Spain) Victoria Iglesias	
28/9/2018	(Spain) Carolina Navarro (Argentina) Cecilia Reiter	6–4 / 6–4	(Spain) Ariana Sánchez (Spain) Marta Ortega	
28/9/2018	(Spain) Alejandra Salazar (Spain) Marta Marrero	6–3 / 6–1	(Spain) Beatriz González (Argentina) Catalina Tenorio	
28/9/2018	(Spain) Gemma Triay (Spain) Lucía Sainz	7–6 / 6–7 / 6–3	(Spain) Elisabeth Amatriain (Spain) Patricia Llaguno	

=== Semi-Finals ===
Date	Winners	Score	Opponent	Refs.
29/9/2018	(Spain) Majo Sanchez (Spain) Mapi Sanchez	6–2 / 6–1	(Spain) Carolina Navarro (Argentina) Cecilia Reiter	
29/9/2018	(Spain) Alejandra Salazar (Spain) Marta Marrero	7–6 / 3–6 / 6–2	(Spain) Gemma Triay (Spain) Lucía Sainz	

=== Finals ===
Date	Winners	Score	Opponent	Refs.
30/9/2018	(Spain) Alejandra Salazar (Spain) Marta Marrero	6–2 / 4–6 / 6–4	(Spain) Majo Sanchez (Spain) Mapi Sanchez	
