= 2018 WPT Master Final =

World Padel Tour tournament held in Madrid, Spain

- Date: 13 – 26 December
- Edition: 13th (Note: The first seven editions we're held under the organization of the Padel Pro Tour.)
- Category: Master Final
- Location: Murcia, Spain
- Venue: Madrid Arena

Champions
- Men's doubles: (Argentina) Fernando Belasteguín (Brazil) Pablo Lima
- Women's doubles: (Spain) Alejandra Salazar (Spain) Marta Marrero

Chronology
Previous
Murcia Open
Next
Marbella Master
(2019)

The 2018 Master Final (officially 2018 World Padel Tour Master Final) was the seventeenth and season-ending tournament of the sixth season organized by World Padel Tour, the most prestigious padel circuit at the time. For the second consecutive year, the tournament counted toward the rankings.

In the women's category, for the seventh time this season, and the third consecutive time, the world's top two-ranked pairs reached the final. In the decisive match, Alejandra Salazar and Marta Marrero, who played in their third Master Final together and their final tournament as a pair, faced twins Majo and Mapi Sánchez, who were appearing in their fifth consecutive Master Final. Salazar and Marrero, who had battled the twins for the world number one spot and competed against them in numerous tournaments between 2015 and 2018, defeated them in three sets to secure their sixth title of the season. This result meant that, despite finishing second in the world rankings, they ended the season as the most decorated pair of the year. Furthermore, they extended their head-to-head record in finals against Majo and Mapi to 6–1 and claimed their second Master Final title together (marking a fourth such victory for Salazar, who also won in 2009 and 2013).

In the men's category, the world number one's, Maxi Sánchez and Sanyo Gutiérrez, would reached their twelfth final of the season (out of a possible 16), having in previous years reached four finals in this competition, winning three of them (two as a pair in 2013 and 2014). Theirs opponents would be the defending champions and second-ranked pair, Fernando Belasteguín and Pablo Lima, who they had faced only once in 2018, with Belasteguín reaching the final in his first tournament back from injury. In the championship match, Belasteguín and Lima defeated Maxi and Sanyo, defending their title successfully and securing their fourth title together this season (the fifth for Lima). This victory marked Belasteguín's seventh Master Final win (having previously won in 2006, 2007, 2009, 2010, 2011, and 2017), while Lima claimed his third (having won in 2012 and 2017).

== Head-to-head record between teams ranked in the top 4 during the season ==
=== Men's ===
Record	Maxi–Sanyo	Belasteguín–Lima	Galán–M. Díaz	Gutiérrez–Stupaczuk	Former Pairs	J.M. Díaz–Paquito	Lima–M. Jardim	Lima–Silingo	Lima–Paquito Navarro
Maxi–Sanyo	—	0–2	3–3	4–2		5–0	—	—	1–0
Belasteguín–Lima	2–0	—	1–0	1–0		2–0	—	—	—
Galán–M. Díaz	3–3	0–1	—	2–2		1–2	—	—	—
Gutiérrez–Stupaczuk	2–4	0–1	2–2	—		—	1–0	—	0–1
Former Pairs									
J.M. Díaz–Paquito	0–5	0–2	2–1	—		—	—	—	—
Lima–M. Jardim	—	—	—	0–1		—	—	—	—
Lima–Silingo	—	—	—	—		—	—	—	—
Lima–Paquito	0–1	—	—	1–0		—	—	—	—

=== Women's ===
Record	Majo–Mapi	Marrero–Salazar	Triay–Sainz	Ariana–Ortega	Former Pairs	Amatriain–Llaguno
Majo–Mapi	—	4–6	4–3	5–1		7–0
Marrero–Salazar	6–4	—	5–5	3–0		2–0
Triay–Sainz	3–4	5–5	—	2–0		3–2
Ariana–Ortega	1–5	0–3	0–2	—		3–1
Former Pairs						
Amatriain–Llaguno	0–7	0–2	2–3	1–3		—

== Draws ==
=== Men's Bracket ===
Quarter-Final
1	(Argentina) Maxi / (Argentina) Sanyo	6	7
6	(Argentina) C. Gutiérrez / (Argentina) Stupaczuk	0	5
8	(Spain) J. Ruiz / (Spain) U. Botello	4	6
3	(Spain) Galán / (Spain) M. Díaz	6	7
4	(Spain) J.M. Díaz / (Spain) Lebrón	4	6	6
7	(Argentina) J.C. Belluati / (Spain) Paquito	6	2	2
5	(Spain) J. Mieres / (Argentina) M. Lamperti	2	6
2	(Argentina) Belasteguín / (Brazil) Lima	6	7

Semi-Finals
1	(Argentina) Maxi / (Argentina) Sanyo	7	6
3	(Spain) Galán / (Spain) M. Díaz	6	2
4	(Spain) J.M. Díaz / (Spain) Lebrón	6	3
2	(Argentina) Belasteguín / (Brazil) Lima	7	6

Finals
1	(Argentina) Maxi / (Argentina) Sanyo	6	3
2	(Argentina) Belasteguín / (Brazil) Lima	7	6

=== Women's Bracket ===
Quarter-Final
1	(Spain) Majo / (Spain) Mapi	6	7
6	(Spain) B. González / (Argentina) C. Tenorio	2	6
5	(Spain) E. Amatriain / (Spain) P. Llaguno
3	(Spain) Gemma / (Spain) L. Sainz
4	(Spain) A. Sánchez / (Spain) M. Ortega	6	6
7	(Spain) T. Navarro / (Spain) V. Iglesias	4	4
8	(Spain) C. Navarro / (Argentina) C. Reiter	1	0
2	(Spain) A. Salazar / (Spain) M. Marrero	6	6

Semi-Finals
1	(Spain) Majo / (Spain) Mapi	6	6	6
5	(Spain) E. Amatriain / (Spain) P. Llaguno	7	4	1
4	(Spain) A. Sánchez / (Spain) M. Ortega	1	3
2	(Spain) A. Salazar / (Spain) M. Marrero	6	6

Finals
1	(Spain) Majo / (Spain) Mapi	3	2
2	(Spain) A. Salazar / (Spain) M. Marrero	6	6

== Results ==
=== Quarter-Finals ===
Men's
Date	Winners	Score	Opponent	Ref.
13/12/2018	(Argentina) Maxi Sánchez (Argentina) Sanyo Gutiérrez	6–0 / 7–5	(Argentina) Cristian Gutiérrez (Argentina) Franco Stupaczuk	
13/12/2018	(Spain) Alejandro Galán (Spain) Matías Díaz	6–4 / 7–6	(Spain) Javi Ruiz (Spain) Uri Botello	
14/12/2018	(Spain) Juan Lebrón (Spain) Juan Martin Díaz	4–6 / 6–2 / 6–2	(Argentina) Juan Cruz Belluati (Spain) Paquito Navarro	
14/12/2018	(Argentina) Fernando Belasteguín (Brazil) Pablo Lima	6–2 / 7–6	(Spain) Juani Mieres (Argentina) Miguel Lamperti	

Women's
Date	Winners	Score	Opponent	Ref.
13/12/2018	(Spain) Majo Sánchez (Spain) Mapi Sánchez	6–2 / 7–6	(Spain) Beatriz González (Argentina) Catalina Tenorio	
13/12/2018	(Spain) Elisabeth Amatriain (Spain) Patricia Llaguno	7–6 / 3–6 / 7–5	(Spain) Gemma Triay (Spain) Lucía Sainz	
14/12/2018	(Spain) Ariana Sánchez (Spain) Marta Ortega	6–4 / 6–4	(Spain) Teresa Navarro (Spain) Victoria Iglesias	
14/12/2018	(Spain) Alejandra Salazar (Spain) Marta Marrero	6–1 / 6–0	(Spain) Carolina Navarro (Argentina) Cecilia Reiter	

=== Semi-Finals ===
Men's
Date	Winners	Score	Opponent	Ref.
15/12/2018	(Argentina) Maxi Sánchez (Argentina) Sanyo Gutiérrez	7–6 / 6–2	(Spain) Alejandro Galán (Spain) Matías Díaz	
15/12/2018	(Argentina) Fernando Belasteguín (Brazil) Pablo Lima	7–6 / 6–3	(Spain) Juan Lebrón (Spain) Juan Martin Díaz	

Women's
Date	Winners	Score	Opponent	Ref.
15/12/2018	(Spain) Majo Sánchez (Spain) Mapi Sánchez	6–7 / 6–4 / 6–1	(Spain) Elisabeth Amatriain (Spain) Patricia Llaguno	
15/12/2018	(Spain) Alejandra Salazar (Spain) Marta Marrero	6–1 / 6–3	(Spain) Ariana Sánchez (Spain) Marta Ortega	

=== Finals ===
Men's
Date	Winners	Score	Opponent	Ref.
16/12/2018	(Argentina) Fernando Belasteguín (Brazil) Pablo Lima	7–6 / 6–3	(Argentina) Maxi Sánchez (Argentina) Sanyo Gutiérrez	

Women's
Date	Winners	Score	Opponent	Ref.
16/12/2018	(Spain) Alejandra Salazar (Spain) Marta Marrero	6–3 / 6–2	(Spain) Majo Sánchez (Spain) Mapi Sánchez	
