= 2018 WPT Lugo Open =

World Padel Tour tournament held in Lugo, Spain

- Date: 3 – 9 September
- Edition: 1st
- Category: Open
- Location: Lugo, Spain
- Venue: Pazo dos Deportes

Champions
- Men's doubles: (Spain) Alejandro Galán (Spain) Matías Díaz
- Women's doubles: (Spain) Alejandra Salazar (Spain) Marta Marrero

Chronology

The 2018 Lugo Open (officially 2018 World Padel Tour Lugo Open) was the tenth tournament of the sixth season organized by World Padel Tour, the most prestigious padel circuit at the time.

In the women's category, Mapi and Majo Sánchez once again reached the final against Alejandra Salazar and Marta Marrero, marking the third final of 2018 between the two pairs. In the title match, Marrero and Salazar overcame the world number ones, defeating twins Majo and Mapi Sánchez, to claim their second title of the season and become the inaugural women's champions of the Lugo Open.

In the men's category, Alejandro Galán and Matias Diaz reached their second final of the year, where they faced Lucho Capra and Ramiro Moyano, who had unexpectedly made it to the final. In the title match, Díaz and Galán gave their opponents no chance, conceding only four games across the two sets to claim their second title of the season and become the inaugural men's champions in Lugo.

== Relevant Data ==
=== Franco Stupaczuk halts Sanyo's rise to the top of the rankings ===
After being eliminated before the semifinals, Sanyo Gutiérrez lost the chance to take sole possession of the world number one spot, leaving Pablo Lima at the top of the rankings for a while longer.

=== A victory dedicated to Bernardo Salazar ===
After Alejandra Salazar and Marta Marrero were crowned champions of the Lugo Open, Alejandra, who just days earlier had lost her father, Bernardo Salazar, a prominent figure in the history of Atlético Madrid and Spanish football, dedicated the tournament victory to him.

=== World Padel Tour and players renew agreement through 2023 ===
During this tournament, the World Padel Tour and the players ratified the agreement originally signed in December 2017, renewing the partnership for five seasons (through 2023) with an option to extend it until 2028, thereby maintaining a collaboration that began in 2014.

== Head-to-head record between teams ranked in the top 4 during the season ==
=== Men's ===
Record	Maxi–Sanyo	Lima–M. Jardim	J.M. Díaz–Paquito	Galán–M. Díaz	Former Pairs	Gutiérrez–Stupaczuk	Belasteguín–Lima
Maxi–Sanyo	—	—	4–0	2–3		3–1	0–1
Lima–M. Jardim	—	—	—	—		0–1	—
J.M. Díaz–Paquito	0–4	—	—	2–1		—	0–2
Galán–M. Díaz	3–2	—	1–2	—		2–2	0–1
Former Pairs							
Gutiérrez–Stupaczuk	1–3	1–0	—	2–2		—	0–1
Belasteguín–Lima	1–0	—	2–0	1–0		1–0	—

=== Women's ===
Record	Majo–Mapi	Marrero–Salazar	Triay–Sainz	Ariana–Ortega	Former Pairs	Amatriain–Llaguno
Majo–Mapi	—	3–2	2–3	2–0		5–0
Marrero–Salazar	2–3	—	2–3	2–0		1–0
Triay–Sainz	3–2	3–2	—	1–0		1–1
Ariana–Ortega	0–2	0–2	0–1	—		2–1
Former Pairs						
Amatriain–Llaguno	0–5	0–1	1–1	1–2		—

== Draws ==
=== Men's Bracket ===
Round of 32
1	(Argentina) Maxi / (Argentina) Sanyo
Bye
Q	(Argentina) G. Reca / (Spain) Momo	3	6	6
(Spain) J.G. Diestro / (Spain) M. Piñeiro	6	4	4
(Argentina) Godo Díaz / (Argentina) G. Tamame	7	4	4
(Argentina) M. Nicoletti / (Spain) P.A. Martínez	6	6	6
(Spain) J. Rico / (Spain) V. Ruiz	6	2	4
(Argentina) C. Gutiérrez / (Argentina) Stupaczuk	3	6	6
(Argentina) J.C. Belluati / (Spain) Lebrón	3	6	6
(Argentina) M. Grabiel / (Spain) P. Lijó	6	3	2
(Spain) Á. Cepero / (Argentina) S. Nerone	6	3	6
(Spain) G. Rubio / (Spain) E. Moreno	4	6	4
(Argentina) F. Chingotto / (Argentina) F. Poggi	6	6
Q	(Spain) A. Blanco / (Spain) J. Vazquez	2	4
Bye
4	(Spain) Galán / (Spain) M. Díaz
3	(Spain) J.M. Díaz / (Spain) Paquito
Bye
Q	(Spain) Coki / (Spain) J. Rico	6	6
(Spain) B. Yribarren / (Spain) W. Lahoz	0	2
(Spain) J. Ruiz / (Spain) U. Botello	7	5	6
(Argentina) A. Silingo / (Spain) A. Ruiz	5	7	1
(Argentina) A. Allemandi / (Spain) J. Garrido	3	2
(Argentina) L. Capra / (Argentina) R. Moyano	6	6
(Spain) J. Mieres / (Argentina) M. Lamperti	6	6
Q	(Spain) J. Barahona / (Argentina) J. Restivo	3	4
(Uruguay) D. Ramos / (Spain) R. Méndez	5	6	6
(Spain) A. Santana / (Spain) I. Gadea	7	2	3
(Brazil) L. Bergamini / (Brazil) L. Campagnolo	6	6	6
(Argentina) F. Quiles / (Brazil) F. Gomes	1	7	4
Bye
2	(Brazil) Lima / (Brazil) M. Jardim

Round of 16
1	(Argentina) Maxi / (Argentina) Sanyo	6	6
(Argentina) G. Reca / (Spain) Momo	1	1
(Argentina) M. Nicoletti / (Spain) P.A. Martínez	3	3
(Argentina) C. Gutiérrez / (Argentina) Stupaczuk	6	6
(Argentina) J.C. Belluati / (Spain) Lebrón	6	3	6
(Spain) Á. Cepero / (Argentina) S. Nerone	4	6	3
(Argentina) F. Chingotto / (Argentina) F. Poggi	4	6
4	(Spain) Galán / (Spain) M. Díaz	6	7
3	(Spain) J.M. Díaz / (Spain) Paquito	6	6
Q	(Spain) Coki / (Spain) J. Rico	4	3
(Spain) J. Ruiz / (Spain) U. Botello	7	3	2
(Argentina) L. Capra / (Argentina) R. Moyano	5	6	6
(Spain) J. Mieres / (Argentina) M. Lamperti	6	6
(Uruguay) D. Ramos / (Spain) R. Méndez	3	3
(Brazil) L. Bergamini / (Brazil) L. Campagnolo	4	2
2	(Brazil) Lima / (Brazil) M. Jardim	6	6

Quarter-Final
1	(Argentina) Maxi / (Argentina) Sanyo	3	3
(Argentina) C. Gutiérrez / (Argentina) Stupaczuk	6	6
(Argentina) J.C. Belluati / (Spain) Lebrón	7	5	5
4	(Spain) Galán / (Spain) M. Díaz	6	7	7
3	(Spain) J.M. Díaz / (Spain) Paquito	6	6	4
(Argentina) L. Capra / (Argentina) R. Moyano	7	3	6
(Spain) J. Mieres / (Argentina) M. Lamperti	6	6
2	(Brazil) Lima / (Brazil) M. Jardim	2	3

Semi-Finals
(Argentina) C. Gutiérrez / (Argentina) Stupaczuk	3	2
4	(Spain) Galán / (Spain) M. Díaz	6	4	*
(Argentina) L. Capra / (Argentina) R. Moyano	7	6
(Spain) J. Mieres / (Argentina) M. Lamperti	6	4

Finals
4	(Spain) Galán / (Spain) M. Díaz	6	6
(Argentina) L. Capra / (Argentina) R. Moyano	0	4

=== Women's Bracket ===
Round of 32
1	(Spain) Majo / (Spain) Mapi
Bye
(Spain) L. Alonso / (Spain) M. Gabarrus	6	6
(Spain) A. Martinez / (Spain) S. Vidal	3	2
(Spain) M. Truchado / (Portugal) S. Araújo	3	6	3
(Spain) E. Ramírez / (Spain) S. Ruiz	6	4	6
(Portugal) A.C. Nogueira / (Argentina) Delfina	3	7	4
(Spain) E. Amatriain / (Spain) P. Llaguno	6	5	6
(Spain) T. Navarro / (Spain) V. Iglesias	6	4	6
(Spain) P. Josemaria / (Argentina) V. Pavón	1	6	4
(Spain) A. Cantin / (Spain) N. Rodriguez	6	4
(Spain) C. Mesa / (Spain) L. Martínez	7	6
(Spain) A.F. de Ossó / (Argentina) V. Riera	6	6
(Spain) I. Domínguez / (Spain) V. Alonso	0	2
Bye
4	(Spain) A. Sánchez / (Spain) M. Ortega
3	(Spain) A. Salazar / (Spain) M. Marrero
Bye
(Argentina) A. Osoro / (Argentina) N. Brito	6	6
(Spain) C. Siverio / (Spain) V. Virseda	2	1
(Spain) N. Rovira / (Spain) R. Aguilar	3	1
(France) A. Collombon / (Spain) S. Pujals	6	3	*
(Spain) M. Talaván / (Spain) T. Icardo	1	1
(Spain) C. Navarro / (Argentina) C. Reiter	6	6
(Spain) B. González / (Argentina) C. Tenorio	6	6
Q	(Spain) N. Traviesa / (Brazil) R. Piltcher	3	1
Q	(Spain) A. Tapia / (Spain) J. Castelló	0	2
(Spain) A. Galán / (Spain) M. Villalba	6	6
Q	(Spain) N. Marquez / (Spain) X. Clasca	6	7
(Spain) A. Blanco / (Spain) B. Caldera	2	6
Bye
2	(Spain) Gemma / (Spain) L. Sainz

Round of 16
1	(Spain) Majo / (Spain) Mapi	6	6
(Spain) L. Alonso / (Spain) M. Gabarrus	1	2
(Spain) E. Ramírez / (Spain) S. Ruiz	0	0
(Spain) E. Amatriain / (Spain) P. Llaguno	6	6
(Spain) T. Navarro / (Spain) V. Iglesias	4	4
(Spain) C. Mesa / (Spain) L. Martínez	6	6
(Spain) A.F. de Ossó / (Argentina) V. Riera	6	1
4	(Spain) A. Sánchez / (Spain) M. Ortega	7	6
3	(Spain) A. Salazar / (Spain) M. Marrero	7	6
(Argentina) A. Osoro / (Argentina) N. Brito	5	0
(France) A. Collombon / (Spain) S. Pujals	0	3
(Spain) C. Navarro / (Argentina) C. Reiter	6	6
(Spain) B. González / (Argentina) C. Tenorio	6	4	6
(Spain) A. Galán / (Spain) M. Villalba	4	6	4
(Spain) N. Marquez / (Spain) X. Clasca
2	(Spain) Gemma / (Spain) L. Sainz	*

Quarter-Final
1	(Spain) Majo / (Spain) Mapi	6	6
(Spain) E. Amatriain / (Spain) P. Llaguno	2	1
(Spain) C. Mesa / (Spain) L. Martínez	5	6	6
4	(Spain) A. Sánchez / (Spain) M. Ortega	7	4	7
3	(Spain) A. Salazar / (Spain) M. Marrero	6	6
(Spain) C. Navarro / (Argentina) C. Reiter	2	2
(Spain) B. González / (Argentina) C. Tenorio	6	7
2	(Spain) Gemma / (Spain) L. Sainz	4	6

Semi-Finals
1	(Spain) Majo / (Spain) Mapi	7	6
4	(Spain) A. Sánchez / (Spain) M. Ortega	5	1
3	(Spain) A. Salazar / (Spain) M. Marrero	6	6
(Spain) B. González / (Argentina) C. Tenorio	2	3

Finals
1	(Spain) Majo / (Spain) Mapi	2	3
3	(Spain) A. Salazar / (Spain) M. Marrero	6	6

== Results ==
=== Round of 32 ===
Men's
Date	Team	Score	Opponent	Ref.
5/9/2018	(Argentina) Gaby Reca (Spain) Momo González	3–6 / 6–4 / 6–4	(Spain) José García Diestro (Spain) Martin Sanchez Piñeiro	
5/9/2018	(Argentina) Matías Nicoletti (Spain) Pedro Alonso Martínez	6–7 / 6–4 / 6–4	(Argentina) Germán Tamame (Argentina) Godo Díaz	
5/9/2018	(Argentina) Cristian Gutiérrez (Argentina) Franco Stupaczuk	3–6 / 6–2 / 6–4	(Spain) José Rico (Spain) Víctor Ruiz	
5/9/2018	(Argentina) Juan Cruz Belluati (Spain) Juan Lebrón	3–6 / 6–3 / 6–2	(Argentina) Maxi Grabiel (Spain) Pablo Lijó	
5/9/2018	(Spain) Álvaro Cepero (Argentina) Sebastián Nerone	6–4 / 3–6 / 6–4	(Spain) Gonzalo Rubio (Spain) Ernesto Moreno	
5/9/2018	(Argentina) Federico Chingotto (Argentina) Fernando Poggi	6–2 / 6–4	(Spain) Adrián Blanco (Spain) Javier Martinez Vazquez	
5/9/2018	(Spain) Coki Nieto (Spain) Javi Rico	6–0 / 6–2	(Spain) Borja Yribarren (Spain) Willy Lahoz	
5/9/2018	(Spain) Javi Ruiz (Spain) Uri Botello	7–5 / 5–7 / 6–1	(Argentina) Agustin Gomez Silingo (Spain) Alejandro Ruiz	
5/9/2018	(Argentina) Lucho Capra (Argentina) Ramiro Moyano	6–3 / 6–2	(Argentina) Adrián Allemandi (Spain) Javi Garrido	
5/9/2018	(Spain) Juani Mieres (Argentina) Miguel Lamperti	6–3 / 6–4	(Spain) Javier Barahona (Argentina) Juan Manuel Restivo	
5/9/2018	(Uruguay) Diego Ramos (Spain) Rafael Méndez	5–7 / 6–2 / 6–3	(Spain) Aday Santana (Spain) Nacho Gadea	
5/9/2018	(Brazil) Lucas Bergamini (Brazil) Lucas Campagnolo	6–1 / 6–7 / 6–4	(Argentina) Federico Quiles (Brazil) Francisco Gomes	

Women's
Date	Team	Score	Opponent	Ref.
5/9/2018	(Spain) Lorena Alonso (Spain) Maite Gabarrus	6–3 / 6–2	(Spain) Araceli Martinez (Spain) Silvia López Vidal	
5/9/2018	(Spain) Elena Ramírez (Spain) Sara Ruiz	6–3 / 4–6 / 6–3	(Spain) Meli García Truchado (Portugal) Sofia Araújo	
5/9/2018	(Spain) Elisabeth Amatriain (Spain) Patricia Llaguno	6–3 / 5–7 / 6–4	(Portugal) Ana Catarina Nogueira (Argentina) Delfina Brea	
5/9/2018	(Spain) Teresa Navarro (Spain) Victoria Iglesias	6–1 / 4–6 / 6–4	(Spain) Paula Josemaria (Argentina) Valeria Pavón	
5/9/2018	(Spain) Carla Mesa (Spain) Lucía Martínez	7–6 / 6–4	(Spain) Angela Caro Cantin (Spain) Nuria Rodriguez	
5/9/2018	(Spain) Ana Fernández de Ossó (Argentina) Virginia Riera	6–0 / 6–2	(Spain) Isabel Domínguez (Spain) Vanesa Alonso	
5/9/2018	(Argentina) Aranzazu Osoro (Argentina) Nela Brito	6–2 / 6–1	(Spain) Clara Teresa Siverio (Spain) Verónica Virseda	
5/9/2018	(France) Alix Collombon (Spain) Sara Pujals	6–0 / 3–1 / W.O.	(Spain) Nuria Rovira (Spain) Raquel Segura Aguilar	
5/9/2018	(Spain) Carolina Navarro (Argentina) Cecilia Reiter	6–1 / 6–1	(Spain) Marta Talaván (Spain) Tamara Icardo	
5/9/2018	(Spain) Beatriz González (Argentina) Catalina Tenorio	6–3 / 6–1	(Spain) Nicole Traviesa Mola (Brazil) Raquel Piltcher	
5/9/2018	(Spain) Alba Galán (Spain) Maria Villalba	6–0 / 6–2	(Spain) Anna Cortiles Tapia (Spain) Jessica Castelló	
5/9/2018	(Spain) Noelia Marquez (Spain) Xenia Clasca	6–2 / 7–6	(Spain) Alicia Blanco Rojo (Spain) Beatriz Caldera	

=== Round of 16 ===
Men's
Date	Team	Score	Opponent	Ref.
6/9/2018	(Argentina) Maxi Sánchez (Argentina) Sanyo Gutiérrez	6–1 / 6–1	(Argentina) Gaby Reca (Spain) Momo González	
6/9/2018	(Argentina) Cristian Gutiérrez (Argentina) Franco Stupaczuk	6–3 / 6–3	(Argentina) Matías Nicoletti (Spain) Pedro Alonso Martínez	
6/9/2018	(Argentina) Juan Cruz Belluati (Spain) Juan Lebrón	6–4 / 3–6 / 6–3	(Spain) Álvaro Cepero (Argentina) Sebastián Nerone	
6/9/2018	(Spain) Alejandro Galán (Spain) Matías Díaz	6–4 / 7–6	(Argentina) Federico Chingotto (Argentina) Fernando Poggi	
6/9/2018	(Spain) Juan Martin Díaz (Spain) Paquito Navarro	6–4 / 6–3	(Spain) Coki Nieto (Spain) Javi Rico	
6/9/2018	(Argentina) Lucho Capra (Argentina) Ramiro Moyano	5–7 / 6–3 / 6–2	(Spain) Javi Ruiz (Spain) Uri Botello	
6/9/2018	(Spain) Juani Mieres (Argentina) Miguel Lamperti	6–3 / 6–3	(Uruguay) Diego Ramos (Spain) Rafael Méndez	
6/9/2018	(Brazil) Marcello Jardim (Brazil) Pablo Lima	6–4 / 6–2	(Brazil) Lucas Bergamini (Brazil) Lucas Campagnolo	

Women's
Date	Team	Score	Opponent	Ref.
6/9/2018	(Spain) Majo Sanchez (Spain) Mapi Sanchez	6–1 / 6–2	(Spain) Lorena Alonso (Spain) Maite Gabarrus	
6/9/2018	(Spain) Elisabeth Amatriain (Spain) Patricia Llaguno	6–0 / 6–0	(Spain) Elena Ramírez (Spain) Sara Ruiz	
6/9/2018	(Spain) Carla Mesa (Spain) Lucía Martínez	6–4 / 6–4	(Spain) Teresa Navarro (Spain) Victoria Iglesias	
6/9/2018	(Spain) Ariana Sánchez (Spain) Marta Ortega	7–6 / 6–1	(Spain) Ana Fernández de Ossó (Argentina) Virginia Riera	
6/9/2018	(Spain) Alejandra Salazar (Spain) Marta Marrero	7–5 / 6–0	(Argentina) Aranzazu Osoro (Argentina) Nela Brito	
6/9/2018	(Spain) Carolina Navarro (Argentina) Cecilia Reiter	6–0 / 6–3	(France) Alix Collombon (Spain) Sara Pujals	
6/9/2018	(Spain) Beatriz González (Argentina) Catalina Tenorio	6–4 / 4–6 / 6–4	(Spain) Alba Galán (Spain) Maria Villalba	
6/9/2018	(Spain) Gemma Triay (Spain) Lucía Sainz	W.O.	(Spain) Noelia Marquez (Spain) Xenia Clasca	

=== Quarter-Finals ===
Men's
Date	Team	Score	Opponent	Ref.
7/9/2018	(Argentina) Cristian Gutiérrez (Argentina) Franco Stupaczuk	6–3 / 6–3	(Argentina) Maxi Sánchez (Argentina) Sanyo Gutiérrez	
7/9/2018	(Spain) Alejandro Galán (Spain) Matías Díaz	6–7 / 7–5 / 7–5	(Argentina) Juan Cruz Belluati (Spain) Juan Lebrón	
7/9/2018	(Argentina) Lucho Capra (Argentina) Ramiro Moyano	7–6 / 3–6 / 6–4	(Spain) Juan Martin Díaz (Spain) Paquito Navarro	
7/9/2018	(Spain) Juani Mieres (Argentina) Miguel Lamperti	6–2 / 6–3	(Brazil) Marcello Jardim (Brazil) Pablo Lima	

Women's
Date	Team	Score	Opponent	Ref.
7/9/2018	(Spain) Majo Sanchez (Spain) Mapi Sanchez	6–2 / 6–1	(Spain) Elisabeth Amatriain (Spain) Patricia Llaguno	
7/9/2018	(Spain) Ariana Sánchez (Spain) Marta Ortega	7–5 / 4–6 / 7–6	(Spain) Carla Mesa (Spain) Lucía Martínez	
7/9/2018	(Spain) Alejandra Salazar (Spain) Marta Marrero	6–2 / 6–2	(Spain) Carolina Navarro (Argentina) Cecilia Reiter	
7/9/2018	(Spain) Beatriz González (Argentina) Catalina Tenorio	6–4 / 7–6	(Spain) Gemma Triay (Spain) Lucía Sainz	

=== Semi-Finals ===
Men's
Date	Team	Score	Opponent	Ref.
8/9/2018	(Spain) Alejandro Galán (Spain) Matías Díaz	6–3 / 4–2 / W.O.	(Argentina) Cristian Gutiérrez (Argentina) Franco Stupaczuk	
8/9/2018	(Argentina) Lucho Capra (Argentina) Ramiro Moyano	7–6 / 6–4	(Spain) Juani Mieres (Argentina) Miguel Lamperti	

Women's
Date	Team	Score	Opponent	Ref.
8/9/2018	(Spain) Majo Sanchez (Spain) Mapi Sanchez	7–5 / 6–1	(Spain) Ariana Sánchez (Spain) Marta Ortega	
8/9/2018	(Spain) Alejandra Salazar (Spain) Marta Marrero	6–2 / 6–3	(Spain) Beatriz González (Argentina) Catalina Tenorio	

=== Finals ===
Men's
Date	Team	Score	Opponent	Ref.
9/9/2018	(Spain) Alejandro Galán (Spain) Matías Díaz	6–0 / 6–4	(Argentina) Lucho Capra (Argentina) Ramiro Moyano	

Women's
Date	Team	Score	Opponent	Ref.
9/9/2018	(Spain) Alejandra Salazar (Spain) Marta Marrero	6–2 / 6–3	(Spain) Majo Sanchez (Spain) Mapi Sanchez	
