= 2018 WPT Jaén Open =

World Padel Tour tournament held in Jaén, Spain

- Date: 21 – 27 May
- Edition: 1st
- Category: Open
- Location: Jaén, Spain
- Venue: Plaza de Santa María

Champions
- Men's doubles: (Argentina) Maxi Sánchez (Argentina) Sanyo Gutiérrez
- Women's doubles: (Spain) Mapi Sánchez Alayeto (Spain) Majo Sánchez Alayeto

Chronology

The 2018 Jaén Open (officially 2018 World Padel Tour Jaén Open) was the fourth tournament of the sixth season organized by World Padel Tour, the most prestigious padel circuit at the time.

In the women's category, the two top-ranked pairs faced each other in the final for the second consecutive tournament. In the title match, world number one twins Majo and Mapi Sánchez defeated Gemma Triay and Lucia Sainz, claiming their first title of the season and becoming the first women's pair to win a title in Jaén.

In the men's category, the No. 2 and No. 3 pairs reached the final for the second consecutive tournament. In the decisive match, Maxi Sánchez and Sanyo Gutiérrez, the world's No. 2 pair, defeated Juan Martín Díaz and Paquito Navarro, thereby claiming their third title of the year out of four tournaments played and becoming the inaugural men's champions in Jaén.

== Head-to-head record between teams ranked in the top 4 during the season ==
=== Men's ===
Record	Belasteguín–Lima	Maxi–Sanyo	J.M. Díaz–Paquito	Gutiérrez–Stupaczuk
Belasteguín–Lima	—	—	1–0	1–0
Maxi–Sanyo	—	—	2–0	1–0
J.M. Díaz–Paquito	0–1	0–2	—	—
Gutiérrez–Stupaczuk	0–1	0–1	—	—

=== Women's ===
Record	Majo–Mapi	Marrero–Salazar	Triay–Sainz	Amatriain–Llaguno	Former Pairs	Ariana–Ortega
Majo–Mapi	—	0–1	1–2	3–0		—
Marrero–Salazar	1–0	—	1–2	1–0		2–0
Triay–Sainz	2–1	2–1	—	—		—
Amatriain–Llaguno	0–3	0–1		—		1–0
Former Pairs						
Ariana–Ortega	—	0–2	—	0–1		—

== Draws ==
=== Men's Bracket ===
Round of 32
1	(Argentina) Belasteguín / (Brazil) Lima
Bye
(Argentina) F. Poggi / (Argentina) G. Reca	6	5	7
(Spain) M. Piñeiro / (Spain) W. Lahoz	4	7	5
(Argentina) A. Allemandi / (Argentina) F. Quiles	6	6	1
(Spain) A. Santana / (Spain) I. Gadea	3	7	6
Q	(Spain) A. Luque / (Portugal) D. Rocha	0	6
(Spain) J. Mieres / (Argentina) M. Lamperti	6	7
(Argentina) J.C. Belluati / (Spain) Lebrón	6	3	4
(Spain) J. Ruiz / (Spain) U. Botello	4	6	6
(Argentina) Chingotto / (Argentina) J. Tello	4	4
(Uruguay) D. Ramos / (Spain) R. Méndez	6	6
(Brazil) L. Bergamini / (Brazil) L. Campagnolo	6	7
(Argentina) A. Silingo / (Spain) A. Ruiz	4	6
Bye
3	(Spain) J.M. Díaz / (Spain) Paquito
4	(Argentina) C. Gutiérrez / (Argentina) Stupaczuk
Bye
(Argentina) Di Nenno / (Argentina) J. Restivo	5	6
Q	(Argentina) C.G. Gutiérrez / (Argentina) J. Vázquez	7	7
Q	(Spain) G. Rubio / (Spain) J. Garrido	6	2
(Argentina) G. Tamame / (Argentina) M. Marina	7	6
(Spain) J. Rico / (Spain) V. Ruiz	6	3
(Argentina) L. Capra / (Argentina) R. Moyano	7	6
(Spain) Galán / (Spain) M. Díaz	2	3
(Argentina) M. Grabiel / (Spain) P. Lijó	6	6
(Argentina) A. Patiniotis / (Spain) P.A. Martinez	4	1
(Spain) A. Cepero / (Argentina) M. Nicoletti	6	6
(Brazil) M. Jardim / (Argentina) Tapia	6	7
(Spain) J.G. Diestro / (Argentina) S. Nerone	2	5
Bye
2	(Argentina) Maxi / (Argentina) Sanyo

Round of 16
1	(Argentina) Belasteguín / (Brazil) Lima	6	6
(Argentina) F. Poggi / (Argentina) G. Reca	2	3
(Spain) A. Santana / (Spain) I. Gadea	6	2	1
(Spain) J. Mieres / (Argentina) M. Lamperti	4	6	6
(Spain) J. Ruiz / (Spain) U. Botello	6	6
(Uruguay) D. Ramos / (Spain) R. Méndez	4	0
(Brazil) L. Bergamini / (Brazil) L. Campagnolo	7	4	2
3	(Spain) J.M. Díaz / (Spain) Paquito	6	6	6
4	(Argentina) C. Gutiérrez / (Argentina) Stupaczuk	1	6	6
Q	(Argentina) C.G. Gutiérrez / (Argentina) J. Vázquez	6	3	3
(Argentina) G. Tamame / (Argentina) M. Marina	2	2
(Argentina) L. Capra / (Argentina) R. Moyano	6	6
(Argentina) M. Grabiel / (Spain) P. Lijó	6	6
(Spain) A. Cepero / (Argentina) M. Nicoletti	4	1
(Brazil) M. Jardim / (Argentina) Tapia	6	7	3
2	(Argentina) Maxi / (Argentina) Sanyo	7	6	6

Quarter-Final
1	(Argentina) Belasteguín / (Brazil) Lima	6	3	4
(Spain) J. Mieres / (Argentina) M. Lamperti	3	6	6
(Spain) J. Ruiz / (Spain) U. Botello	1	3
3	(Spain) J.M. Díaz / (Spain) Paquito	6	6
4	(Argentina) C. Gutiérrez / (Argentina) Stupaczuk	3	6	7
(Argentina) L. Capra / (Argentina) R. Moyano	6	3	6
(Argentina) M. Grabiel / (Spain) P. Lijó	4	5
2	(Argentina) Maxi / (Argentina) Sanyo	6	7

Semi-Finals
(Spain) J. Mieres / (Argentina) M. Lamperti	6	2
3	(Spain) J.M. Díaz / (Spain) Paquito	7	6
4	(Argentina) C. Gutiérrez / (Argentina) Stupaczuk	1	0
2	(Argentina) Maxi / (Argentina) Sanyo	6	1	*

Finals
3	(Spain) J.M. Díaz / (Spain) Paquito	3	3
2	(Argentina) Maxi / (Argentina) Sanyo	6	6

=== Women's Bracket ===
Round of 32
1	(Spain) Majo / (Spain) Mapi
Bye
(Spain) A. Blanco / (Spain) B. Caldera	6	6	6
(Spain) L. Torres / (Spain) X. Vidiella	1	7	3
(Spain) M. Villalba / (Argentina) V. Pavón	6	5	6
(Portugal) F. Mendonça / (Spain) M. Gonzalez	3	7	3
(Spain) S. Hernández / (Spain) V. Virseda	3	6
(Spain) T. Navarro / (Spain) V. Iglesias	6	7
(Spain) C. Navarro / (Argentina) C. Reiter	7	6
(Spain) I. Domínguez / (Spain) V. Alonso	6	3
(France) L. Clergue / (Spain) M. Truchado	3	2
(Spain) A.F. de Ossó / (Spain) M. Gabarrus	6	6
(Spain) C. Mesa / (Spain) L. Martínez	6	6
(France) A. Collombon / (Spain) S. Pujals	4	4
Bye
4	(Spain) E. Amatriain / (Spain) P. Llaguno
3	(Spain) A. Salazar / (Spain) M. Marrero
Bye
Q	(Spain) A. Tapia / (Portugal) S. Araújo	7	6
(Spain) E. Ramírez / (Spain) N. Marquez	6	3
(Portugal) A.C. Nogueira / (Argentina) Delfina	5	6	6
(Venezuela) A. Cali / (Spain) I. Egaña	7	4	1
(Spain) A. Cantin / (Spain) N. Rodriguez	6	2
(Spain) B. González / (Argentina) C. Tenorio	7	6
(Spain) A. Sánchez / (Spain) M. Ortega	6	3	4
(Spain) L. Alonso / (Argentina) V. Riera	3	6	6
(Argentina) A. Berl / (Argentina) N. Brito	5	1
(Spain) M. Talaván / (Spain) T. Icardo	7	6
(Argentina) G. Bartomioli / (Spain) S. Ruiz	0	3
(Spain) C. Siverio / (Spain) S. Vidal	6	6
Bye
2	(Spain) Gemma / (Spain) L. Sainz

Round of 16
1	(Spain) Majo / (Spain) Mapi	6	6
(Spain) A. Blanco / (Spain) B. Caldera	1	1
(Spain) M. Villalba / (Argentina) V. Pavón	6	4	5
(Spain) T. Navarro / (Spain) V. Iglesias	3	6	7
(Spain) C. Navarro / (Argentina) C. Reiter	6	6
(Spain) A.F. de Ossó / (Spain) M. Gabarrus	3	1
(Spain) C. Mesa / (Spain) L. Martínez	2	0
4	(Spain) E. Amatriain / (Spain) P. Llaguno	6	6
3	(Spain) A. Salazar / (Spain) M. Marrero	6	6
(Spain) A. Tapia / (Portugal) S. Araújo	2	2
(Portugal) A.C. Nogueira / (Argentina) Delfina	4	5
(Spain) B. González / (Argentina) C. Tenorio	6	7
(Spain) L. Alonso / (Argentina) V. Riera	7	6
(Spain) M. Talaván / (Spain) T. Icardo	6	1
(Spain) C. Siverio / (Spain) S. Vidal	1	1
2	(Spain) Gemma / (Spain) L. Sainz	6	6

Quarter-Final
1	(Spain) Majo / (Spain) Mapi	6	7
(Spain) T. Navarro / (Spain) V. Iglesias	2	6
(Spain) C. Navarro / (Argentina) C. Reiter	3	5
4	(Spain) E. Amatriain / (Spain) P. Llaguno	6	7
3	(Spain) A. Salazar / (Spain) M. Marrero	4	4
(Spain) B. González / (Argentina) C. Tenorio	6	6
(Spain) L. Alonso / (Argentina) V. Riera	4	4
2	(Spain) Gemma / (Spain) L. Sainz	6	6

Semi-Finals
1	(Spain) Majo / (Spain) Mapi	6	6
4	(Spain) E. Amatriain / (Spain) P. Llaguno	1	4
(Spain) B. González / (Argentina) C. Tenorio	4	2
2	(Spain) Gemma / (Spain) L. Sainz	6	6

Finals
1	(Spain) Majo / (Spain) Mapi	7	3	7
2	(Spain) Gemma / (Spain) L. Sainz	5	6	6

== Results ==
=== Round of 32 ===
Men's

Date	Winners	Score	Opponent	Refs.
23/5/2018	(Argentina) Fernando Poggi (Argentina) Gaby Reca	6–4 / 5–7 / 7–5	(Spain) Martin Sanchez Piñeiro (Spain) Willy Lahoz	
23/5/2018	(Spain) Aday Santana (Spain) Nacho Gadea	3–6 / 7–6 / 6–1	(Argentina) Adrian Allemandi (Argentina) Federico Quiles	
23/5/2018	(Spain) Juani Mieres (Argentina) Miguel Lamperti	6–0 / 7–6	(Spain) Antonio Luque (Portugal) Diogo Rocha	
23/5/2018	(Spain) Javi Ruiz (Spain) Uri Botello	4–6 / 6–3 / 6–4	(Argentina) Juan Cruz Belluati (Spain) Juan Lebrón	
23/5/2018	(Uruguay) Diego Ramos (Spain) Rafael Méndez	6–4 / 6–4	(Argentina) Federico Chingotto (Argentina) Juan Tello	
23/5/2018	(Brazil) Lucas Bergamini (Brazil) Lucas Campagnolo	6–4 / 7–6	(Argentina) Agustin Gomez Silingo (Spain) Alejandro Ruiz	
23/5/2018	(Argentina) Cristian German Gutiérrez (Argentina) Juan Manuel Vázquez	7–5 / 7–6	(Argentina) Juan Manuel Restivo (Argentina) Martín Di Nenno	
23/5/2018	(Argentina) German Tamame (Argentina) Matías Marina	7–6 / 6–2	(Spain) Gonzalo Rubio (Spain) Javi Garrido	
23/5/2018	(Argentina) Lucho Capra (Argentina) Ramiro Moyano	7–6 / 6–3	(Spain) José Rico (Spain) Víctor Ruiz	
23/5/2018	(Argentina) Maxi Grabiel (Spain) Pablo Lijó	6–2 / 6–3	(Spain) Alejandro Galán (Spain) Matías Díaz	
23/5/2018	(Spain) Álvaro Cepero (Argentina) Matías Nicoletti	6–4 / 6–1	(Argentina) Aris Patiniotis (Spain) Pedro Alonso Martinez	
23/5/2018	(Argentina) Agustín Tapia (Brazil) Marcello Jardim	6–2 / 7–5	(Spain) José García Diestro (Argentina) Sebastián Nerone	

Women's

Date	Winners	Score	Opponent	Refs.
23/5/2018	(Spain) Alicia Blanco Rojo (Spain) Beatriz Caldera	6–1 / 6–7 / 6–3	(Spain) Laia Bonilla Torres (Spain) Xenia Vidiella	
23/5/2018	(Spain) Maria Villalba (Argentina) Valeria Pavón	6–3 / 5–7 / 6–3	(Portugal) Filipa Mendonça (Spain) Marta González	
23/5/2018	(Spain) Teresa Navarro (Spain) Victoria Iglesias	6–3 / 7–6	(Spain) Sandra Hernández (Spain) Verónica Virseda	
23/5/2018	(Spain) Carolina Navarro (Argentina) Cecilia Reiter	7–6 / 6–3	(Spain) Isabel Domínguez (Spain) Vanesa Alonso	
23/5/2018	(Spain) Ana Fernandez de Ossó (Spain) Maite Gabarrus Alonso	6–3 / 6–2	(Spain) Andrea Medina (France) Laura Clergue	
23/5/2018	(Spain) Carla Mesa (Spain) Lucía Martínez	6–4 / 6–4	(France) Alix Collombon (Spain) Sara Pujals	
23/5/2018	(Spain) Anna Cortiles Tapia (Portugal) Sofia Araújo	7–6 / 6–3	(Spain) Elena Ramírez (Spain) Noelia Márquez	
23/5/2018	(Portugal) Ana Catarina Nogueira (Argentina) Delfina Brea	5–7 / 6–4 / 6–1	(Venezuela) Ana Seijas Cali (Spain) Idoia Egaña	
23/5/2018	(Spain) Beatriz González (Argentina) Catalina Tenorio	7–6 / 6–2	(Spain) Angela Caro Cantin (Spain) Nuria Rodriguez	
23/5/2018	(Spain) Lorena Alonso (Argentina) Virginia Riera	3–6 / 6–3 / 6–4	(Spain) Ariana Sánchez (Spain) Marta Ortega	
23/5/2018	(Spain) Marta Talaván (Spain) Tamara Icardo	7–5 / 6–1	(Argentina) Alicia Lilian Berl (Argentina) Nela Brito	
23/5/2018	(Spain) Clara Siverio (Spain) Silvia López Vidal	6–0 / 6–3	(Argentina) Gabriela Bartomioli (Spain) Sara Ruiz	

=== Round of 16 ===
Men's

Date	Winners	Score	Opponent	Refs.
24/5/2018	(Argentina) Fernando Belasteguín (Brazil) Pablo Lima	6–2 / 6–3	(Argentina) Fernando Poggi (Argentina) Gaby Reca	
24/5/2018	(Spain) Juani Mieres (Argentina) Miguel Lamperti	4–6 / 6–2 / 6–1	(Spain) Aday Santana (Spain) Nacho Gadea	
24/5/2018	(Spain) Javi Ruiz (Spain) Uri Botello	6–4 / 6–0	(Uruguay) Diego Ramos (Spain) Rafael Méndez	
24/5/2018	(Spain) Juan Martin Díaz (Spain) Paquito Navarro	6–7 / 6–4 / 6–2	(Brazil) Lucas Bergamini (Brazil) Lucas Campagnolo	
24/5/2018	(Argentina) Cristian Gutiérrez (Argentina) Franco Stupaczuk	1–6 / 6–3 / 6–3	(Argentina) Cristian German Gutiérrez (Argentina) Juan Manuel Vázquez	
24/5/2018	(Argentina) Lucho Capra (Argentina) Ramiro Moyano	6–2 / 6–2	(Argentina) German Tamame (Argentina) Matías Marina	
24/5/2018	(Argentina) Maxi Grabiel (Spain) Pablo Lijó	6–4 / 6–1	(Spain) Álvaro Cepero (Argentina) Matías Nicoletti	
24/5/2018	(Argentina) Maxi Sánchez (Argentina) Sanyo Gutiérrez	7–6 / 6–7 / 6–3	(Argentina) Agustín Tapia (Brazil) Marcello Jardim	

Women's

Date	Winners	Score	Opponent	Refs.
24/5/2018	(Spain) Majo Sanchez (Spain) Mapi Sanchez	6–1 / 6–1	(Spain) Alicia Blanco Rojo (Spain) Beatriz Caldera	
24/5/2018	(Spain) Teresa Navarro (Spain) Victoria Iglesias	3–6 / 6–4 / 7–5	(Spain) Maria Villalba (Argentina) Valeria Pavón	
24/5/2018	(Spain) Carolina Navarro (Argentina) Cecilia Reiter	6–3 / 6–1	(Spain) Ana Fernandez de Ossó (Spain) Maite Gabarrus Alonso	
24/5/2018	(Spain) Elisabeth Amatriain (Spain) Patricia Llaguno	6–2 / 6–0	(Spain) Carla Mesa (Spain) Lucía Martínez	
24/5/2018	(Spain) Alejandra Salazar (Spain) Marta Marrero	6–2 / 6–2	(Spain) Anna Cortiles Tapia (Portugal) Sofia Araújo	
24/5/2018	(Spain) Beatriz González (Argentina) Catalina Tenorio	6–4 / 7–5	(Portugal) Ana Catarina Nogueira (Argentina) Delfina Brea	
24/5/2018	(Spain) Lorena Alonso (Argentina) Virginia Riera	7–6 / 6–1	(Spain) Marta Talaván (Spain) Tamara Icardo	
24/5/2018	(Spain) Gemma Triay (Spain) Lucía Sainz	6–1 / 6–1	(Spain) Clara Siverio (Spain) Silvia López Vidal	

=== Quarter-Finals ===
Men's

Date	Winners	Score	Opponent	Refs.
25/5/2018	(Spain) Juani Mieres (Argentina) Miguel Lamperti	3–6 / 6–3 / 6–4	(Argentina) Fernando Belasteguín (Brazil) Pablo Lima	
25/5/2018	(Spain) Juan Martin Díaz (Spain) Paquito Navarro	6–1 / 6–3	(Spain) Javi Ruiz (Spain) Uri Botello	
25/5/2018	(Argentina) Cristian Gutiérrez (Argentina) Franco Stupaczuk	3–6 / 6–3 / 7–6	(Argentina) Lucho Capra (Argentina) Ramiro Moyano	
25/5/2018	(Argentina) Maxi Sánchez (Argentina) Sanyo Gutiérrez	6–4 / 7–5	(Argentina) Maxi Grabiel (Spain) Pablo Lijó	

Women's

Date	Winners	Score	Opponent	Refs.
25/5/2018	(Spain) Majo Sanchez (Spain) Mapi Sanchez	6–2 / 7–6	(Spain) Teresa Navarro (Spain) Victoria Iglesias	
25/5/2018	(Spain) Elisabeth Amatriain (Spain) Patricia Llaguno	6–3 / 7–5	(Spain) Carolina Navarro (Argentina) Cecilia Reiter	
25/5/2018	(Spain) Beatriz González (Argentina) Catalina Tenorio	6–4 / 6–4	(Spain) Alejandra Salazar (Spain) Marta Marrero	
25/5/2018	(Spain) Gemma Triay (Spain) Lucía Sainz	6–4 / 6–4	(Spain) Lorena Alonso (Argentina) Virginia Riera	

=== Semi-Finals ===
Men's

Date	Winners	Score	Opponent	Refs.
26/5/2018	(Spain) Juan Martin Díaz (Spain) Paquito Navarro	7–6 / 6–2	(Spain) Juani Mieres (Argentina) Miguel Lamperti	
26/5/2018	(Argentina) Maxi Sánchez (Argentina) Sanyo Gutiérrez	6–1 / 1–0 / W.O.	(Argentina) Cristian Gutiérrez (Argentina) Franco Stupaczuk	

Women's

Date	Winners	Score	Opponent	Refs.
26/5/2018	(Spain) Majo Sanchez (Spain) Mapi Sanchez	6–1 / 6–4	(Spain) Elisabeth Amatriain (Spain) Patricia Llaguno	
26/5/2018	(Spain) Gemma Triay (Spain) Lucía Sainz	6–4 / 6–2	(Spain) Beatriz González (Argentina) Catalina Tenorio	

=== Finals ===
Men's

Date	Winners	Score	Opponent	Refs.
27/5/2018	(Argentina) Maxi Sánchez (Argentina) Sanyo Gutiérrez	6–3 / 6–3	(Spain) Juan Martin Díaz (Spain) Paquito Navarro	

Women's

Date	Winners	Score	Opponent	Refs.
27/5/2018	(Spain) Majo Sanchez (Spain) Mapi Sanchez	7–5 / 3–6 / 7–6	(Spain) Gemma Triay (Spain) Lucía Sainz	
