= María José Sánchez Alayeto =

Spanish tennis and padel player

- Native name: Atomic Twin Majo
- Country (sports): Spain
- Born: 20 June 1984 (age 41) Zaragoza, Spain
- Height: 1.73 m (5 ft 8 in)
- Retired: 2003
- Plays: Right (two-handed backhand)
- Prize money: US$ 18,915

Singles
- Career titles: 4 ITF

Doubles
- Career titles: 4 ITF

María José Sánchez Alayeto (born 20 June 1984) is a former professional tennis player and current professional padel player from Spain. She is the twin sister of María Pilar Sánchez Alayeto.

== Tennis career ==
María José Sánchez Alayeto has won four singles titles, and four doubles titles in the ITF Women's Circuit. She retired from professional tennis in 2003, with a win rate of 65% and 64% in her singles and doubles career, respectively.

== Padel career ==
Since 2013, she has been a professional padel player, where she was ranked No. 1 worldwide in 2019, alongside her partner and twin sister María Pilar Sánchez Alayeto. She has won 244 out of the 302 games she has played.
