= María Pilar Sánchez Alayeto =

Spanish tennis and padel player

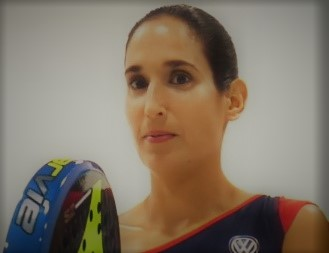
- Country (sports): Spain
- Born: 20 June 1984 (age 41); Zaragoza, Spain
- Height: 1.73 m (5 ft 8 in)
- Retired: 2003
- Plays: Right-handed (two-handed backhand)

Singles
- Career titles: 0

Doubles
- Career titles: 1 ITF

María Pilar Sánchez Alayeto (born 20 June 1984) is a Spanish former professional tennis player and a current professional padel player.

== Career ==
She is the twin sister of María José Sánchez Alayeto, a former professional tennis player and current professional padel player. She won one doubles titles on the ITF Women's Circuit, and retired from professional tennis in 2003.

Since 2013, she has been a professional padel player. She has attained a world No. 1 ranking as of 2019, alongside her partner twin sister.
