= 2018 WPT Portugal Master =

World Padel Tour tournament held in Lisbon, Portugal

- Date: 17 – 23 September
- Edition: 4th (Note: The first two editions were held as a Open event.)
- Category: Master
- Location: Lisbon, Portugal
- Venue: Estádio Nacional do Jamor

Champions
- Men's doubles: (Argentina) Maxi Sánchez (Argentina) Sanyo Gutiérrez
- Women's doubles: (Spain) Mapi Sánchez (Spain) Majo Sánchez

Chronology

The 2018 Portugal Master (officially 2018 World Padel Tour Portugal Master) was the eleventh tournament of the sixth season organized by World Padel Tour, the most prestigious padel circuit at the time.

In the women's category, Mapi and Majo Sánchez reached the final once again to face Gemma Triay and Lucia Sainz, their fourth encounter in a final during the 2018 season. In the battle for the title, the Sánchez twins, who lead the world rankings, defeated Gemma and Lucia to secure their fifth title of the season, bringing them very close to finishing the year as the world number ones. Although other editions of the tournament had previously been held in Portugal, this was the first to include a women's draw, making Majo and Mapi the first players to win a title on Portuguese soil.

In the men’s category, Maxi Sánchez and Sanyo Gutiérrez reached their eighth final of the year (out of 11 possible), where they faced the veteran duo of Juani Mieres and Miguel Lamperti, who were making their first final appearance of 2018. In the battle for the title, Sánchez and Gutiérrez defeated their opponents in straight sets, securing their sixth title of the season, the first for both in Portugal, and reaching the world number 1 ranking as a team (with Sánchez also taking the top spot individually) for the first time in their carrers.

== Relevant Data ==
=== Belasteguín’s injury forces Lima to find a new partner ===
Following two tournaments with results that fell short of expectations, which caused him to lose ground to Maxi Sánchez and Sanyo Gutiérrez in the race for the world number one ranking, Pablo Lima has decided to part ways with Marcello Jardím. While awaiting Fernando Belasteguín’s recovery, Lima will team up with a new partner, Agustín Gómez Silingo, who underwent surgery last season and was ranked 50th.

=== Paquito Navarro hospitalized ===
During the tournament semifinals, Paquito Navarro was taken to São Francisco Xavier Hospital after a glass wall on the court collapsed on top of him following a collision. The athlete, and his partner Juan Martín Díaz, were forced to withdraw from the match, which they had been leading 1–0 in sets against Lamperti and Mieres, with the second set tied at 5–5 and the score at 30–30. Due to Navarro’s withdrawal, Lamperti and Mieres advanced to their first final of the season.

=== New kings of the padel world ===
With his victory in the final of the Portugal Master, Maxi Sánchez accomplished on his first attempt what Sanyo Gutiérrez had failed to do twice earlier in the season, becoming the sole world number one. He is only the fourth player to lead the rankings in the last 17 years, a list that includes Fernando Belasteguín (who held the top spot both solo and alongside partners) Juan Martín Díaz, Pablo Lima (who held it solo for three tournaments), and now, Sánchez. In addition to claiming the individual number one spot, Sánchez, together with Sanyo, also took over the number one ranking for pairs on the circuit.

== Head-to-head record between teams ranked in the top 4 during the season ==
=== Men's ===
Record	Maxi–Sanyo	Galán–M. Díaz	Lima–Silingo	J.M. Díaz–Paquito	Former Pairs	Gutiérrez–Stupaczuk	Belasteguín–Lima	Lima–M. Jardim
Maxi–Sanyo	—	2–3	—	4–0		3–1	0–1	—
Galán–M. Díaz	3–2	—	—	1–2		2–2	0–1	—
Lima–Silingo	—	—	—	—		—	—	—
J.M. Díaz–Paquito	0–4	2–1	—	—		—	0–2	—
Former Pairs								
Gutiérrez–Stupaczuk	1–3	2–2	—	—		—	0–1	1–0
Belasteguín–Lima	1–0	1–0	—	2–0		1–0	—	—
Lima–M. Jardim	—	—	—	—		0–1	—	—

=== Women's ===
Record	Majo–Mapi	Marrero–Salazar	Triay–Sainz	Ariana–Ortega	Former Pairs	Amatriain–Llaguno
Majo–Mapi	—	3–2	3–3	3–0		6–0
Marrero–Salazar	2–3	—	2–4	2–0		1–0
Triay–Sainz	3–3	4–2	—	1–0		1–1
Ariana–Ortega	0–3	0–2	0–1	—		2–1
Former Pairs						
Amatriain–Llaguno	0–6	0–1	1–1	1–2		—

== Draws ==
=== Men's Bracket ===
Round of 32
1	(Argentina) Maxi / (Argentina) Sanyo	6	6
Q	(Argentina) G. Reca / (Spain) Momo	4	2
(Brazil) M. Jardim / (Spain) P. San Roman	3	3
(Argentina) M. Grabiel / (Spain) P. Lijó	6	6
(Spain) Á. Cepero / (Argentina) S. Nerone	7	6
(Argentina) M. Nicoletti / (Spain) P.A. Martínez	5	2
(Argentina) F. Chingotto / (Argentina) J. Tello	6	2	6
(Argentina) C. Gutiérrez / (Argentina) Stupaczuk	1	6	7
(Argentina) L. Capra / (Argentina) R. Moyano	3	6	4
(Uruguay) D. Ramos / (Spain) R. Méndez	6	4	6
(Spain) J. Rico / (Spain) V. Ruiz	3	4
(Spain) J. Ruiz / (Spain) U. Botello	6	6
(Brazil) L. Bergamini / (Brazil) L. Campagnolo	6	6
(Argentina) G. Tamame / (Spain) N. Gadea	1	3
(Spain) B. Yribarren / (Spain) W. Lahoz	2	2
3	(Argentina) A. Silingo / (Brazil) Lima	6	6
4	(Spain) J.M. Díaz / (Spain) Paquito	7	6
Q	(Spain) Coki / (Spain) J. Rico	5	3
(Spain) G. Company / (Spain) R. Rivera	2	6	4
(Spain) A. Santana / (Argentina) Godo Díaz	6	2	6
Q	(Spain) A. Blanco / (Spain) J. Vazquez	3	3
(Spain) A. Ruiz / (Spain) J. Garrido	6	6
(Argentina) A. Allemandi / (Argentina) F. Poggi	2	6	6
(Argentina) J.C. Belluati / (Spain) Lebrón	6	2	2
(Spain) J. Mieres / (Argentina) M. Lamperti	7	6
(Spain) J.G. Diestro / (Spain) M. Piñeiro	5	4
(Portugal) M. Oliveira / (Spain) P. Fernández	7	7
(Argentina) F. Quiles / (Brazil) F. Gomes	6	6
Q	(Spain) J. Barahona / (Argentina) J. Vázquez	6	4	4
(Spain) G. Rubio / (Spain) E. Moreno	3	6	6
(Argentina) C.G. Gutiérrez / (Argentina) J. Restivo	4	3
2	(Spain) Galán / (Spain) M. Díaz	6	6

Round of 16
1	(Argentina) Maxi / (Argentina) Sanyo	6	7
(Argentina) M. Grabiel / (Spain) P. Lijó	2	6
(Spain) Á. Cepero / (Argentina) S. Nerone	6	6
(Argentina) C. Gutiérrez / (Argentina) Stupaczuk	4	3
(Uruguay) D. Ramos / (Spain) R. Méndez	1	3
(Spain) J. Ruiz / (Spain) U. Botello	6	6
(Brazil) L. Bergamini / (Brazil) L. Campagnolo	2	4
3	(Argentina) A. Silingo / (Brazil) Lima	6	6
4	(Spain) J.M. Díaz / (Spain) Paquito	6	6
(Spain) A. Santana / (Argentina) Godo Díaz	2	4
(Spain) A. Ruiz / (Spain) J. Garrido	6	4
(Argentina) A. Allemandi / (Argentina) F. Poggi	7	6
(Spain) J. Mieres / (Argentina) M. Lamperti	7	6
(Portugal) M. Oliveira / (Spain) P. Fernández	5	4
(Spain) G. Rubio / (Spain) E. Moreno	7	7
2	(Spain) Galán / (Spain) M. Díaz	6	5

Quarter-Final
1	(Argentina) Maxi / (Argentina) Sanyo	2	6	6
(Spain) Á. Cepero / (Argentina) S. Nerone	6	1	2
(Spain) J. Ruiz / (Spain) U. Botello	3	6	6
3	(Argentina) A. Silingo / (Brazil) Lima	6	3	3
4	(Spain) J.M. Díaz / (Spain) Paquito	4	6	6
' (Argentina) A. Allemandi / (Argentina) F. Poggi	6	1	4
(Spain) J. Mieres / (Argentina) M. Lamperti	6	6
(Spain) G. Rubio / (Spain) E. Moreno	1	3

Semi-Finals
1	(Argentina) Maxi / (Argentina) Sanyo	6	6
(Spain) J. Ruiz / (Spain) U. Botello	1	4
4	(Spain) J.M. Díaz / (Spain) Paquito	6	5
(Spain) J. Mieres / (Argentina) M. Lamperti	3	5	*

Finals
1	(Argentina) Maxi / (Argentina) Sanyo	7	7
(Spain) J. Mieres / (Argentina) M. Lamperti	6	5

=== Women's Bracket ===
Round of 32
1	(Spain) Majo / (Spain) Mapi
Bye
(Spain) E. Ramírez / (Spain) R. Aguilar	6	1	1
Q	(Spain) N. Traviesa / (Brazil) R. Piltcher	3	6	6
Q	(Spain) A. Tapia / (Spain) J. Castelló	4	5
(France) A. Collombon / (Spain) S. Pujals	6	7
(Portugal) H. Medeiros / (Portugal) M. Fernandes	1	0
(Spain) E. Amatriain / (Spain) P. Llaguno	6	6
(Spain) C. Navarro / (Argentina) C. Reiter	6	6
(Spain) L. Alonso / (Spain) M. Gabarrus	2	2
(France) L. Clergue / (Spain) S. Ruiz	3	3
Q	(Spain) M. Truchado / (Portugal) S. Araújo	6	6
(Portugal) A.C. Nogueira / (Argentina) Delfina	6	4	6
(Spain) P. Josemaria / (Argentina) V. Pavón	4	6	3
Bye
4	(Spain) A. Sánchez / (Spain) M. Ortega
3	(Spain) A. Salazar / (Spain) M. Marrero
Bye
(Spain) N. Márquez / (Spain) V. Virseda	1	4
(Spain) A.F. de Ossó / (Argentina) V. Riera	6	6
(Spain) M. Talaván / (Spain) T. Icardo	6	4	3
(Argentina) A. Osoro / (Argentina) N. Brito	3	6	6
(Spain) C. Mesa / (Spain) L. Martínez	5	7	4
(Spain) T. Navarro / (Spain) V. Iglesias	7	6	6
(Spain) B. González / (Argentina) C. Tenorio	6	6
Q	(Venezuela) A. Seijas Cali / (Spain) L. Torres	1	2
(Spain) A. Cantin / (Spain) N. Rodriguez	4	3
(Spain) A. Galán / (Spain) M. Villalba	6	6
(Spain) A. Blanco / (Spain) B. Caldera	6	1	1
(Spain) I. Domínguez / (Spain) V. Alonso	4	6	6
Bye
2	(Spain) Gemma / (Spain) L. Sainz

Round of 16
1	(Spain) Majo / (Spain) Mapi	6	6
Q	(Spain) N. Traviesa / (Brazil) R. Piltcher	0	3
(France) A. Collombon / (Spain) S. Pujals	5	1
(Spain) E. Amatriain / (Spain) P. Llaguno	7	6
(Spain) C. Navarro / (Argentina) C. Reiter	7	6
(Spain) M. Truchado / (Portugal) S. Araújo	6	2
(Portugal) A.C. Nogueira / (Argentina) Delfina	5	6
4	(Spain) A. Sánchez / (Spain) M. Ortega	7	7
3	(Spain) A. Salazar / (Spain) M. Marrero	6	7
(Spain) A.F. de Ossó / (Argentina) V. Riera	2	5
(Argentina) A. Osoro / (Argentina) N. Brito	3	6	5
(Spain) T. Navarro / (Spain) V. Iglesias	6	3	7
(Spain) B. González / (Argentina) C. Tenorio	6	2	*
(Spain) A. Galán / (Spain) M. Villalba	4	0
(Spain) I. Domínguez / (Spain) V. Alonso	0	0
2	(Spain) Gemma / (Spain) L. Sainz	6	6

Quarter-Final
1	(Spain) Majo / (Spain) Mapi	6	6	6
(Spain) E. Amatriain / (Spain) P. Llaguno
(Spain) C. Navarro / (Argentina) C. Reiter	3	1
4	(Spain) A. Sánchez / (Spain) M. Ortega	6	6
3	(Spain) A. Salazar / (Spain) M. Marrero	6	6
(Spain) T. Navarro / (Spain) V. Iglesias	1	3
(Spain) B. González / (Argentina) C. Tenorio	2	1
2	(Spain) Gemma / (Spain) L. Sainz	6	6

Semi-Finals
1	(Spain) Majo / (Spain) Mapi	6	6
4	(Spain) A. Sánchez / (Spain) M. Ortega	1	1
3	(Spain) A. Salazar / (Spain) M. Marrero	6	2	0
2	(Spain) Gemma / (Spain) L. Sainz	3	6	6

Finals
1	(Spain) Majo / (Spain) Mapi	0	6	7
2	(Spain) Gemma / (Spain) L. Sainz	6	4	5

== Results ==
=== Round of 32 ===
Men's
Date	Team	Score	Opponent	Ref.
19/9/2018	(Argentina) Maxi Sánchez (Argentina) Sanyo Gutiérrez	6–4 / 6–2	(Argentina) Gaby Reca (Spain) Momo González	
19/9/2018	(Argentina) Maxi Grabiel (Spain) Pablo Lijó	6–3 / 6–3	(Brazil) Marcelo Jardim (Spain) Pedro San Roman	
19/9/2018	(Spain) Álvaro Cepero (Argentina) Sebastián Nerone	7–5 / 6–2	(Argentina) Matías Nicoletti (Spain) Pedro Alonso Martínez	
19/9/2018	(Argentina) Cristian Gutiérrez (Argentina) Franco Stupaczuk	1–6 / 6–2 / 7–6	(Argentina) Federico Chingotto (Argentina) Juan Tello	
19/9/2018	(Uruguay) Diego Ramos (Spain) Rafael Méndez	6–3 / 4–6 / 6–4	(Argentina) Lucho Capra (Argentina) Ramiro Moyano	
19/9/2018	(Spain) Javi Ruiz (Spain) Uri Botello	6–3 / 6–4	(Spain) José Rico (Spain) Víctor Ruiz	
19/9/2018	(Brazil) Lucas Bergamini (Brazil) Lucas Campagnolo	6–1 / 6–3	(Argentina) Germán Tamame (Spain) Nacho Gadea	
19/9/2018	(Argentina) Agustin Gomez Silingo (Brazil) Pablo Lima	6–2 / 6–2	(Spain) Borja Yribarren (Spain) Willy Lahoz	
19/9/2018	(Spain) Juan Martin Díaz (Spain) Paquito Navarro	7–5 / 6–3	(Spain) Coki Nieto (Spain) Javi Rico	
19/9/2018	(Spain) Aday Santana (Argentina) Godo Díaz	6–2 / 2–6 / 6–4	(Spain) Gerard Company (Spain) Rubén Rivera	
19/9/2018	(Spain) Alejandro Ruiz (Spain) Javi Garrido	6–3 / 6–3	(Spain) Adrián Blanco (Spain) Javier Martinez Vazquez	
19/9/2018	(Argentina) Adrián Allemandi (Argentina) Fernando Poggi	2–6 / 6–2 / 6–2	(Argentina) Juan Cruz Belluati (Spain) Juan Lebrón	
19/9/2018	(Spain) Juani Mieres (Argentina) Miguel Lamperti	7–5 / 6–4	(Spain) José García Diestro (Spain) Martin Sanchez Piñeiro	
19/9/2018	(Portugal) Miguel Oliveira (Spain) Pincho Fernández	7–6 / 7–6	(Argentina) Federico Quiles (Brazil) Francisco Gomes	
19/9/2018	(Spain) Gonzalo Rubio (Spain) Ernesto Moreno	3–6 / 6–4 / 6–4	(Spain) Javier Barahona (Argentina) Juan Manuel Vázquez	
19/9/2018	(Spain) Alejandro Galán (Spain) Matías Díaz	6–4 / 6–3	(Argentina) Cristian German Gutiérrez (Argentina) Juan Manuel Restivo	

Women's
Date	Team	Score	Opponent	Ref.
19/9/2018	(Spain) Nicole Traviesa Mola (Brazil) Raquel Piltcher	3–6 / 6–1 / 6–1	(Spain) Elena Ramírez (Spain) Raquel Segura Aguilar	
19/9/2018	(France) Alix Collombon (Spain) Sara Pujals	6–4 / 7–5	(Spain) Anna Cortiles Tapia (Spain) Jessica Castelló	
19/9/2018	(Spain) Elisabeth Amatriain (Spain) Patricia Llaguno	6–1 / 6–0	(Portugal) Helena Medeiros (Portugal) Margarida Fernandes	
19/9/2018	(Spain) Carolina Navarro (Argentina) Cecilia Reiter	6–2 / 6–2	(Spain) Lorena Alonso (Spain) Maite Gabarrus	
19/9/2018	(Spain) Meli García Truchado (Portugal) Sofia Araújo	6–3 / 6–3	(France) Laura Clergue (Spain) Sara Ruiz	
19/9/2018	(Portugal) Ana Catarina Nogueira (Argentina) Delfina Brea	6–4 / 4–6 / 6–3	(Spain) Paula Josemaria (Argentina) Valeria Pavón	
19/9/2018	(Spain) Ana Fernández de Ossó (Argentina) Virginia Riera	6–1 / 6–4	(Spain) Noelia Márquez (Spain) Verónica Virseda	
19/9/2018	(Argentina) Aranzazu Osoro (Argentina) Nela Brito	3–6 / 6–4 / 6–3	(Spain) Marta Talaván (Spain) Tamara Icardo	
19/9/2018	(Spain) Teresa Navarro (Spain) Victoria Iglesias	7–5 / 6–7 / 6–4	(Spain) Carla Mesa (Spain) Lucía Martínez	
19/9/2018	(Spain) Beatriz González (Argentina) Catalina Tenorio	6–1 / 6–2	(Venezuela) Ana Seijas Cali (Spain) Laia Torres	
19/9/2018	(Spain) Alba Galán (Spain) Maria Villalba	6–4 / 6–3	(Spain) Angela Caro Cantin (Spain) Nuria Rodriguez	
19/9/2018	(Spain) Isabel Domínguez (Spain) Vanesa Alonso	4–6 / 6–1 / 6–1	(Spain) Alicia Blanco Rojo (Spain) Beatriz Caldera	

=== Round of 16 ===
Men's
Date	Team	Score	Opponent	Ref.
20/9/2018	(Argentina) Maxi Sánchez (Argentina) Sanyo Gutiérrez	6–2 / 7–6	(Argentina) Maxi Grabiel (Spain) Pablo Lijó	
20/9/2018	(Spain) Álvaro Cepero (Argentina) Sebastián Nerone	6–4 / 6–3	(Argentina) Cristian Gutiérrez (Argentina) Franco Stupaczuk	
20/9/2018	(Spain) Javi Ruiz (Spain) Uri Botello	6–1 / 6–3	(Uruguay) Diego Ramos (Spain) Rafael Méndez	
20/9/2018	(Argentina) Agustin Gomez Silingo (Brazil) Pablo Lima	6–2 / 6–4	(Brazil) Lucas Bergamini (Brazil) Lucas Campagnolo	
20/9/2018	(Spain) Juan Martin Díaz (Spain) Paquito Navarro	6–2 / 6–4	(Spain) Aday Santana (Argentina) Godo Díaz	
20/9/2018	(Argentina) Adrián Allemandi (Argentina) Fernando Poggi	7–6 / 6–4	(Spain) Alejandro Ruiz (Spain) Javi Garrido	
20/9/2018	(Spain) Juani Mieres (Argentina) Miguel Lamperti	7–5 / 6–4	(Portugal) Miguel Oliveira (Spain) Pincho Fernández	
20/9/2018	(Spain) Gonzalo Rubio (Spain) Ernesto Moreno	7–6 / 7–5	(Spain) Alejandro Galán (Spain) Matías Díaz	

Women's
Date	Team	Score	Opponent	Ref.
20/9/2018	(Spain) Majo Sanchez (Spain) Mapi Sanchez	6–0 / 6–3	(Spain) Nicole Traviesa Mola (Brazil) Raquel Piltcher	
20/9/2018	(Spain) Elisabeth Amatriain (Spain) Patricia Llaguno	7–5 / 6–1	(France) Alix Collombon (Spain) Sara Pujals	
20/9/2018	(Spain) Carolina Navarro (Argentina) Cecilia Reiter	7–6 / 6–2	(Spain) Meli García Truchado (Portugal) Sofia Araújo	
20/9/2018	(Spain) Ariana Sánchez (Spain) Marta Ortega	7–5 / 7–6	(Portugal) Ana Catarina Nogueira (Argentina) Delfina Brea	
20/9/2018	(Spain) Alejandra Salazar (Spain) Marta Marrero	6–2 / 7–5	(Spain) Ana Fernández de Ossó (Argentina) Virginia Riera	
20/9/2018	(Argentina) Aranzazu Osoro (Argentina) Nela Brito	6–3 / 3–6 / 7–5	(Spain) Teresa Navarro (Spain) Victoria Iglesias	
20/9/2018	(Spain) Beatriz González (Argentina) Catalina Tenorio	6–4 / 2–0 / W.O.	(Spain) Alba Galán (Spain) Maria Villalba	
20/9/2018	(Spain) Gemma Triay (Spain) Lucía Sainz	6–0 / 6–0	(Spain) Isabel Domínguez (Spain) Vanesa Alonso	

=== Quarter-Finals ===
Men's
Date	Team	Score	Opponent	Ref.
21/9/2018	(Argentina) Maxi Sánchez (Argentina) Sanyo Gutiérrez	2–6 / 6–1 / 6–2	(Spain) Álvaro Cepero (Argentina) Sebastián Nerone	
21/9/2018	(Spain) Javi Ruiz (Spain) Uri Botello	3–6 / 6–3 / 6–3	(Argentina) Agustin Gomez Silingo (Brazil) Pablo Lima	
21/9/2018	(Spain) Juan Martin Díaz (Spain) Paquito Navarro	4–6 / 6–1 / 6–4	(Argentina) Adrián Allemandi (Argentina) Fernando Poggi	
21/9/2018	(Spain) Juani Mieres (Argentina) Miguel Lamperti	6–1 / 6–3	(Spain) Gonzalo Rubio (Spain) Ernesto Moreno	

Women's
Date	Team	Score	Opponent	Ref.
21/9/2018	(Spain) Majo Sanchez (Spain) Mapi Sanchez	6–4 / 6–7 / 6–1	(Spain) Elisabeth Amatriain (Spain) Patricia Llaguno	
21/9/2018	(Spain) Ariana Sánchez (Spain) Marta Ortega	6–3 / 6–1	(Spain) Carolina Navarro (Argentina) Cecilia Reiter	
21/9/2018	(Spain) Alejandra Salazar (Spain) Marta Marrero	6–1 / 6–3	(Argentina) Aranzazu Osoro (Argentina) Nela Brito	
21/9/2018	(Spain) Gemma Triay (Spain) Lucía Sainz	6–2 / 6–1	(Spain) Beatriz González (Argentina) Catalina Tenorio	

=== Semi-Finals ===
Men's
Date	Team	Score	Opponent	Ref.
22/9/2018	(Argentina) Maxi Sánchez (Argentina) Sanyo Gutiérrez	6–1 / 6–4	(Spain) Javi Ruiz (Spain) Uri Botello	
22/9/2018	(Spain) Juani Mieres (Argentina) Miguel Lamperti	3–6 / 5–5 / W.O.	(Spain) Juan Martin Díaz (Spain) Paquito Navarro	

Women's
Date	Team	Score	Opponent	Ref.
22/9/2018	(Spain) Majo Sanchez (Spain) Mapi Sanchez	6–1 / 6–1	(Spain) Ariana Sánchez (Spain) Marta Ortega	
22/9/2018	(Spain) Gemma Triay (Spain) Lucía Sainz	3–6 / 6–2 / 6–0	(Spain) Alejandra Salazar (Spain) Marta Marrero	

=== Finals ===
Men's
Date	Team	Score	Opponent	Ref.
23/9/2018	(Argentina) Maxi Sánchez (Argentina) Sanyo Gutiérrez	7–6 / 7–5	(Spain) Juani Mieres (Argentina) Miguel Lamperti	

Women's
Date	Team	Score	Opponent	Ref.
23/9/2018	(Spain) Majo Sanchez (Spain) Mapi Sanchez	0–6 / 6–4 / 7–5	(Spain) Gemma Triay (Spain) Lucía Sainz	
