= 2019 WPT Menorca Open =

World Padel Tour tournament held in Menorca, Spain

- Date: 8 – 13 October
- Edition: 1st
- Category: Open
- Location: Menorca, Spain
- Venue: Pavelló Menorca

Champions
- Men's doubles: (Argentina) Maxi Sánchez (Argentina) Sanyo Gutiérrez
- Women's doubles: (Spain) Mapi Sánchez (Spain) Majo Sánchez

Chronology

The 2019 Menorca Open (officially 2019 World Padel Tour Estrella Damm Menorca Open) was the thirteenth tournament of the seventh season organized by World Padel Tour, the most prestigious padel circuit at the time.

In the women's category, after eliminating Marta Marrero and Marta Ortega, the number one ranked pair in the FIP rankings, the twins Majo and Mapi Sánchez reached their first final of the season in their second tournament together after Mapi's return from injury. Their opponents in the final were the number 2 ranked pair, Alejandra Salazar and Ariana Sánchez. In the final, Majo and Mapi defeated Ariana and Salazar in three sets, winning their first title of the year and becoming the inaugural women's champions in Menorca.

In the men's category, the world number 6 ranked pair Javi Ruiz and Uri Botello reached the first final of their careers, where they faced the world number 1s, Maxi Sánchez and Sanyo Gutiérrez. In the final, Maxi and Sanyo defeated Botello and Ruiz in straight sets, ending a five-month drought without lifting a trophy and securing their fourth title of the year. With this victory, Maxi and Sanyo also became the inaugural men's champions in Menorca.

== Head-to-head record between teams ranked in the top 4 during the season ==
=== Men's ===
Record	Maxi–Sanyo	Lebrón–Paquito	Galán–Lima	Belasteguín–Tapia	Former Pairs	Díaz–Stupaczuk	Belasteguín–Lima	Galán–J. Mieres	Lamperti–Mieres	
Maxi–Sanyo	—	3–1	—	1–1		3–0	—	1–1	—	
Lebrón–Paquito	1–3	—	0–2	0–2		2–2	5–0	2–0	—	
Galán–Lima	—	2–0	—	1–0		—	—	—	—	
Belasteguín–Tapia	1–1	2–0	0–1	—		1–0	—	—	—	
Former Pairs
Díaz–Stupaczuk	0–3	2–2	—	0–1		—	0–1	2–0	—	
Belasteguín–Lima	—	0–5	—	—		1–0	—	0–1	—	
Galán–J. Mieres	1–1	0–2	—	—		0–2	1–0	—	—	
Lamperti–Mieres	—	—	—	—		—	—	—	—	—

=== Women's ===
Record	Marrero–Ortega	Ariana–Salazar	Triay–Sainz	Amatriain–Llaguno	Former Pairs	Majo–Mapi	Delfina–Majo
Marrero–Ortega	—	4–2	3–0	3–2		—	2–0
Ariana–Salazar	2–4	—	4–0	3–0		1–1	4–0
Triay–Sainz	0–3	0–4	—	0–1		—	—
Amatriain–Llaguno	2–3	0–3	1–0	—		1–1	2–3
Former Pairs
Majo–Mapi	—	1–1	—	1–1		—	—
Delfina–Majo	0–2	0–4	—	3–2		—	—

== Draws ==
=== Men's Bracket ===
Round of 32
1	(Argentina) Maxi / (Argentina) Sanyo
Bye
(Argentina) C. Gutiérrez / (Argentina) F. Quiles	2	6	5
(Spain) A. Ruiz / (Spain) M. Piñeiro	6	3	7
(Spain) Coki / (Spain) J. Rico	3	6	6
(Spain) J. Rico / (Spain) V. Ruiz	6	3	4
(Spain) J. Gutiérrez / (Spain) J.G. Diestro	5	6	6
8	(Argentina) A. Allemandi / (Argentina) A. Silingo	7	3	4
7	(Argentina) F. Chingotto / (Argentina) J. Tello	7	6
(Brazil) L. Campagnolo / (Argentina) L. Capra	6	2
(Uruguay) D. Ramos / (Spain) R. Méndez	7	3	5
(Spain) A. Santana / (Brazil) L. Bergamini	5	6	7
(Spain) I. Ramírez / (Spain) M. Yanguas	3	1
(Argentina) A. Gutiérrez / (Chile) J. Valdes	6	6
Bye
4	(Argentina) Belasteguín / (Argentina) Tapia
3	(Spain) Galán / (Brazil) Lima
Bye
(Argentina) J. Restivo / (Argentina) M. Grabiel	2	2
(Argentina) Di Nenno / (Spain) J. Garrido	6	6
(Spain) G. Rubio / (Spain) E. Moreno	4	2
(Argentina) D. Perino / (Brazil) M. Jardim	6	6
(Spain) Á. Cepero / (Spain) P. Lijó	2	4
6	(Spain) J. Ruiz / (Spain) U. Botello	6	6
5	(Argentina) F. Stupaczuk / (Spain) M. Díaz	6	6
(Spain) N. Gadea / (Argentina) S. Nerone	0	4
(Portugal) D. Rocha / (Spain) P. Fernández	6	6	3
(Spain) A. Blanco / (Spain) J. Martinez	7	4	6
(Spain) J. Barahona / (Spain) J. Gutiérrez	6	6
(Spain) J. Morillas / (Spain) J. Muñoz	3	1
Bye
2	(Spain) Lebrón / (Spain) Paquito

Round of 16
1	(Argentina) Maxi / (Argentina) Sanyo	6	7	6
(Spain) A. Ruiz / (Spain) M. Piñeiro	7	6	3
(Spain) Coki / (Spain) J. Rico	6	6
(Spain) J. Gutiérrez / (Spain) J.G. Diestro	2	4
7	(Argentina) F. Chingotto / (Argentina) J. Tello	4	6	6
(Spain) A. Santana / (Brazil) L. Bergamini	6	1	4
(Argentina) A. Gutiérrez / (Chile) J. Valdes	2	4
4	(Argentina) Belasteguín / (Argentina) Tapia	6	6
3	(Spain) Galán / (Brazil) Lima	7	6
(Argentina) Di Nenno / (Spain) J. Garrido	5	2
(Argentina) D. Perino / (Brazil) M. Jardim	2	2
6	(Spain) J. Ruiz / (Spain) U. Botello	6	6
5	(Argentina) F. Stupaczuk / (Spain) M. Díaz	6	6
(Spain) A. Blanco / (Spain) J. Martinez	0	2
(Spain) J. Barahona / (Spain) J. Gutiérrez	3	3
2	(Spain) Lebrón / (Spain) Paquito	6	6

Quarter-Final
1	(Argentina) Maxi / (Argentina) Sanyo	6	2	7
(Spain) Coki / (Spain) J. Rico	3	6	6
7	(Argentina) F. Chingotto / (Argentina) J. Tello	6	3	4
4	(Argentina) Belasteguín / (Argentina) Tapia	3	6	6
3	(Spain) Galán / (Brazil) Lima	4	4
6	(Spain) J. Ruiz / (Spain) U. Botello	6	6
5	(Argentina) F. Stupaczuk / (Spain) M. Díaz	6	6
2	(Spain) Lebrón / (Spain) Paquito	4	2

Semi-Finals
1	(Argentina) Maxi / (Argentina) Sanyo	6	6
4	(Argentina) Belasteguín / (Argentina) Tapia	3	2
6	(Spain) J. Ruiz / (Spain) U. Botello	6	7
5	(Argentina) F. Stupaczuk / (Spain) M. Díaz	4	5

Finals
1	(Argentina) Maxi / (Argentina) Sanyo	6	6
6	(Spain) J. Ruiz / (Spain) U. Botello	4	3

=== Women's Bracket ===
Round of 32
1	(Spain) M. Marrero / (Spain) M. Ortega
Bye
(Spain) L. Rufo / (Spain) S. Saiz	5	2
(Spain) A. Galán / (Spain) V. Iglesias	7	6
(France) A. Collombon / (Spain) N. Traviesa	5	6	6
(Spain) L. Alonso / (Spain) S. Pujals	7	2	7
(Spain) J. Bautista / (Spain) L. Torres	1	0
6	(Spain) Majo / (Spain) Mapi	6	6
5	(Portugal) A.C. Nogueira / (Spain) P. Josemaría	6	7
(Spain) A. Tapia / (Spain) J. Castelló	3	5
(Spain) C. Goenaga / (Spain) N. Rodríguez	6	3	3
(Spain) M. Villalba / (Spain) V. Virseda	3	6	6
(Spain) A. Blanco / (Spain) B. Caldera	1	6	6
(Spain) S. Hernández / (Spain) T. Icardo	6	3	3
Bye
4	(Spain) E. Amatriain / (Spain) P. Llaguno
3	(Spain) Gemma / (Spain) L. Sainz
Bye
(Spain) E. Carnicero / (Spain) M. Merino	3	1
(Spain) L. Martínez / (Spain) T. Navarro	6	6
(Portugal) S. Araújo / (Argentina) V. Riera	6	6
(Spain) E. Ramírez / (Spain) M. Talavan	1	3
(Argentina) C. Paz / (Spain) S. Ruiz	1	0
7	(Spain) B. González / (Argentina) D. Brea	6	6
8	(Spain) C. Navarro / (Argentina) C. Reiter	6	7
(Spain) A.F. de Ossó / (Spain) C. Mesa	0	5
(Argentina) J. Bidahorria / (Brazil) R. Piltcher	4	1
(Spain) A. Cantin / (Spain) N. Rovira	6	6
(Spain) A. Martinez / (Argentina) C. Tenorio	3	6	6
(Spain) I. Domínguez / (Spain) V. Alonso	6	3	3
Bye
2	(Spain) Ariana / (Spain) Salazar

Round of 16
1	(Spain) M. Marrero / (Spain) M. Ortega	7	6
(Spain) A. Galán / (Spain) V. Iglesias	5	1
(Spain) L. Alonso / (Spain) S. Pujals	0	3
6	(Spain) Majo / (Spain) Mapi	6	6
5	(Portugal) A.C. Nogueira / (Spain) P. Josemaría	7	6
(Spain) M. Villalba / (Spain) V. Virseda	6	3
(Spain) A. Blanco / (Spain) B. Caldera	2	2
4	(Spain) E. Amatriain / (Spain) P. Llaguno	6	6
3	(Spain) Gemma / (Spain) L. Sainz	6	6
(Spain) L. Martínez / (Spain) T. Navarro	4	4
(Portugal) S. Araújo / (Argentina) V. Riera	2	3
7	(Spain) B. González / (Argentina) D. Brea	6	6
8	(Spain) C. Navarro / (Argentina) C. Reiter	6	6
(Spain) A. Cantin / (Spain) N. Rovira	2	1
(Spain) A. Martinez / (Argentina) C. Tenorio	7	0	3
2	(Spain) Ariana / (Spain) Salazar	6	6	6

Quarter-Final
1	(Spain) M. Marrero / (Spain) M. Ortega	7	3	5
6	(Spain) Majo / (Spain) Mapi	6	6	7
5	(Portugal) A.C. Nogueira / (Spain) P. Josemaría	6	6
4	(Spain) E. Amatriain / (Spain) P. Llaguno	7	7
3	(Spain) Gemma / (Spain) L. Sainz	6	4	*
7	(Spain) B. González / (Argentina) D. Brea	4	0
8	(Spain) C. Navarro / (Argentina) C. Reiter	4	2
2	(Spain) Ariana / (Spain) Salazar	6	6

Semi-Finals
6	(Spain) Majo / (Spain) Mapi	6	6
4	(Spain) E. Amatriain / (Spain) P. Llaguno	3	3
3	(Spain) Gemma / (Spain) L. Sainz	6	3	3
2	(Spain) Ariana / (Spain) Salazar	4	6	6

Finals
6	(Spain) Majo / (Spain) Mapi	5	7	6
2	(Spain) Ariana / (Spain) Salazar	7	6	1

== Results ==
=== Round of 32 ===
Men's
Date	Winners	Score	Opponent	Ref.
9/10/2019	(Spain) Alejandro Ruiz (Spain) Martin Sánchez Piñeiro	6–2 / 3–6 / 7–5	(Argentina) Cristian Gutiérrez (Argentina) Federico Quiles	
9/10/2019	(Spain) Coki Nieto (Spain) Javi Rico	3–6 / 6–3 / 6–4	(Spain) José Rico (Spain) Víctor Ruiz	
9/10/2019	(Spain) José García Diestro (Spain) Jorge Ruiz Gutiérrez	5–7 / 6–3 / 6–4	(Argentina) Agustin Goméz Silingo (Argentina) Adrián Allemandi	
9/10/2019	(Argentina) Federico Chingotto (Argentina) Juan Tello	7–6 / 6–2	(Brazil) Lucas Campagnolo (Argentina) Lucho Capra	
9/10/2019	(Spain) Aday Santana (Brazil) Lucas Bergamini	5–7 / 6–3 / 7–5	(Uruguay) Diego Ramos (Spain) Rafael Méndez	
9/10/2019	(Argentina) Agustín Gutiérrez (Chile) Javier Valdes González	6–3 / 6–1	(Spain) Iván Ramírez (Spain) Miguel Yanguas	
9/10/2019	(Spain) Javi Garrido (Argentina) Martín Di Nenno	6–2 / 6–2	(Argentina) Juan Manuel Restivo (Argentina) Maxi Grabiel	
9/10/2019	(Argentina) Denis Perino (Brazil) Marcelo Jardim	6–4 / 6–2	(Spain) Gonzalo Rubio (Spain) Ernesto Moreno	
9/10/2019	(Spain) Javi Ruiz (Spain) Uri Botello	6–2 / 6–4	(Spain) Álvaro Cepero (Spain) Pablo Lijó	
9/10/2019	(Argentina) Franco Stupaczuk (Spain) Matías Díaz	6–0 / 6–4	(Spain) Nacho Gadea (Argentina) Sebastián Nerone	
9/10/2019	(Spain) Adrián Blanco (Spain) Javier Martinez Vazquez	7–6 / 4–6 / 6–3	(Portugal) Diogo Rocha (Spain) Pincho Fernández	
9/10/2019	(Spain) Javier Barahona (Spain) Momo González	6–3 / 6–1	(Spain) Javier Pérez Morillas (Spain) Jordi Muñoz	

Women's
Date	Winners	Score	Opponent	Ref.
9/10/2019	(Spain) Alba Galán (Spain) Victoria Iglesias	7–5 / 6–2	(Spain) Lorena Rufo (Spain) Sofía Saiz	
9/10/2019	(Spain) Lorena Alonso (Spain) Sara Pujals	7–5 / 2–6 / 7–6	(France) Alix Collombon (Spain) Nicole Traviesa Mola	
9/10/2019	(Spain) Majo Sánchez (Spain) Mapi Sánchez	6–1 / 6–0	(Spain) Julia Polo Bautista (Spain) Laia Bonilla Torres	
9/10/2019	(Portugal) Ana Catarina Nogueira (Spain) Paula Josemaría	6–3 / 7–5	(Spain) Anna Cortiles Tapia (Spain) Jessica Castelló	
9/10/2019	(Spain) Maria Villalba (Spain) Verónica Virseda	3–6 / 6–3 / 6–3	(Spain) Carmen Goenaga (Spain) Nuria Rodríguez	
9/10/2019	(Spain) Alicia Blanco Rojo (Spain) Beatriz Caldera	1–6 / 6–3 / 6–3	(Spain) Sandra Hernández (Spain) Tamara Icardo	
9/10/2019	(Spain) Lucía Martínez (Spain) Teresa Navarro	6–3 / 6–1	(Spain) Esther Carnicero (Spain) Melania Merino	
9/10/2019	(Portugal) Sofia Araújo (Argentina) Virginia Riera	6–1 / 6–3	(Spain) Elena Ramírez (Spain) Marta Talavan	
9/10/2019	(Spain) Bea González (Argentina) Delfina Brea	6–1 / 6–0	(Argentina) Celeste Paz (Spain) Sara Ruiz	
9/10/2019	(Spain) Carolina Navarro (Argentina) Cecilia Reiter	6–0 / 7–5	(Spain) Ana Fernández de Ossó (Spain) Carla Mesa	
9/10/2019	(Spain) Angela Caro Cantin (Spain) Nuria Rovira	6–4 / 6–1	(Argentina) Julieta Bidahorria (Brazil) Raquel Piltcher	
9/10/2019	(Spain) Araceli Martinez (Argentina) Catalina Tenorio	3–6 / 6–3 / 6–3	(Spain) Isabel Domínguez (Spain) Vanesa Alonso	

=== Round of 16 ===
Men's
Date	Winners	Score	Opponent	Ref.
10/10/2019	(Argentina) Maxi Sánchez (Argentina) Sanyo Gutiérrez	6–7 / 7–6 / 6–3	(Spain) Alejandro Ruiz (Spain) Martin Sánchez Piñeiro	
10/10/2019	(Spain) Coki Nieto (Spain) Javi Rico	6–2 / 6–4	(Spain) José García Diestro (Spain) Jorge Ruiz Gutiérrez	
10/10/2019	(Argentina) Federico Chingotto (Argentina) Juan Tello	4–6 / 6–1 / 6–4	(Spain) Aday Santana (Brazil) Lucas Bergamini	
10/10/2019	(Argentina) Agustín Tapia (Argentina) Fernando Belasteguín	6–2 / 6–4	(Argentina) Agustín Gutiérrez (Chile) Javier Valdes González	
10/10/2019	(Spain) Alejandro Galán (Brazil) Pablo Lima	7–5 / 6–2	(Spain) Javi Garrido (Argentina) Martín Di Nenno	
10/10/2019	(Spain) Javi Ruiz (Spain) Uri Botello	6–2 / 6–2	(Argentina) Denis Perino (Brazil) Marcelo Jardim	
10/10/2019	(Argentina) Franco Stupaczuk (Spain) Matías Díaz	6–0 / 6–2	(Spain) Adrián Blanco (Spain) Javier Martinez Vazquez	
10/10/2019	(Spain) Juan Lebrón (Spain) Paquito Navarro	6–3 / 6–3	(Spain) Javier Barahona (Spain) Momo González	

Women's
Date	Winners	Score	Opponent	Ref.
10/10/2019	(Spain) Marta Marrero (Spain) Marta Ortega	7–5 / 6–1	(Spain) Alba Galán (Spain) Victoria Iglesias	
10/10/2019	(Spain) Majo Sánchez (Spain) Mapi Sánchez	6–0 / 6–3	(Spain) Lorena Alonso (Spain) Sara Pujals	
10/10/2019	(Portugal) Ana Catarina Nogueira (Spain) Paula Josemaría	7–6 / 6–3	(Spain) Maria Villalba (Spain) Verónica Virseda	
10/10/2019	(Spain) Elisabeth Amatriain (Spain) Patricia Llaguno	6–2 / 6–2	(Spain) Alicia Blanco Rojo (Spain) Beatriz Caldera	
10/10/2019	(Spain) Gemma Triay (Spain) Lucia Sainz	6–4 / 6–4	(Spain) Lucía Martínez (Spain) Teresa Navarro	
10/10/2019	(Spain) Bea González (Argentina) Delfina Brea	6–2 / 6–3	(Portugal) Sofia Araújo (Argentina) Virginia Riera	
10/10/2019	(Spain) Carolina Navarro (Argentina) Cecilia Reiter	6–2 / 6–1	(Spain) Angela Caro Cantin (Spain) Nuria Rovira	
10/10/2019	(Spain) Alejandra Salazar (Spain) Ariana Sánchez	6–7 / 6–0 / 6–3	(Spain) Araceli Martinez (Argentina) Catalina Tenorio	

=== Quarter-Finals ===
Men's
Date	Winners	Score	Opponent	Ref.
11/10/2019	(Argentina) Maxi Sánchez (Argentina) Sanyo Gutiérrez	6–3 / 2–6 / 7–6	(Spain) Coki Nieto (Spain) Javi Rico	
11/10/2019	(Argentina) Agustín Tapia (Argentina) Fernando Belasteguín	3–6 / 6–3 / 6–4	(Argentina) Federico Chingotto (Argentina) Juan Tello	
11/10/2019	(Spain) Javi Ruiz (Spain) Uri Botello	6–4 / 6–4	(Spain) Alejandro Galán (Brazil) Pablo Lima	
11/10/2019	(Argentina) Franco Stupaczuk (Spain) Matías Díaz	6–4 / 6–2	(Spain) Juan Lebrón (Spain) Paquito Navarro	

Women's
Date	Winners	Score	Opponent	Ref.
11/10/2019	(Spain) Majo Sánchez (Spain) Mapi Sánchez	6–7 / 6–3 / 7–5	(Spain) Marta Marrero (Spain) Marta Ortega	
11/10/2019	(Portugal) Ana Catarina Nogueira (Spain) Paula Josemaría	7–6 / 7–6	(Spain) Elisabeth Amatriain (Spain) Patricia Llaguno	
11/10/2019	(Spain) Gemma Triay (Spain) Lucia Sainz	6–4 / 4–0 / W.O.	(Spain) Bea González (Argentina) Delfina Brea	
11/10/2019	(Spain) Alejandra Salazar (Spain) Ariana Sánchez	6–4 / 6–2	(Spain) Carolina Navarro (Argentina) Cecilia Reiter	

=== Semi-Finals ===
Men's
Date	Winners	Score	Opponent	Ref.
12/10/2019	(Argentina) Maxi Sánchez (Argentina) Sanyo Gutiérrez	6–3 / 6–2	(Argentina) Agustín Tapia (Argentina) Fernando Belasteguín	
12/10/2019	(Spain) Javi Ruiz (Spain) Uri Botello	6–4 / 7–5	(Argentina) Franco Stupaczuk (Spain) Matías Díaz	

Women's
Date	Winners	Score	Opponent	Ref.
12/10/2019	(Spain) Majo Sánchez (Spain) Mapi Sánchez	6–3 / 6–3	(Portugal) Ana Catarina Nogueira (Spain) Paula Josemaría	
12/10/2019	(Spain) Alejandra Salazar (Spain) Ariana Sánchez	4–6 / 6–3 / 6–3	(Spain) Gemma Triay (Spain) Lucia Sainz	

=== Finals ===
Men's
Date	Winners	Score	Opponent	Ref.
13/10/2019	(Argentina) Maxi Sánchez (Argentina) Sanyo Gutiérrez	6–4 / 6–3	(Spain) Javi Ruiz (Spain) Uri Botello	

Women's
Date	Winners	Score	Opponent	Ref.
13/10/2019	(Spain) Majo Sánchez (Spain) Mapi Sánchez	5–7 / 7–6 / 6–1	(Spain) Alejandra Salazar (Spain) Ariana Sánchez	
