= 2018 WPT Valladolid Open =

World Padel Tour tournament held in Valladolid, Spain

- Date: 17 – 24 June
- Edition: 11th (Note: The first seven editions were held under the organization of the Padel Pro Tour.)
- Category: Open
- Location: Valladolid, Spain
- Venue: Plaza Mayor

Champions
- Men's doubles: (Spain) Alejandro Galán (Spain) Matías Díaz
- Women's doubles: (Spain) Gemma Triay (Spain) Lucía Sainz

Chronology

The 2018 Valladolid Open (officially 2018 World Padel Tour Valladolid Open) was the fifth tournament of the sixth season organized by World Padel Tour, the most prestigious padel circuit at the time.

In the women's category, the top two ranked pairs faced each other in the final for the third consecutive tournament. In the title match, Gemma Triay and Lucia Sainz avenged their previous loss in Jaén by defeating the twins Majo and Mapi Sánchez, securing their third title of the season (their first in Valladolid), and establishing themselves as a threat to the twins' top ranking.

In the men's category, the world's number two pair, Maxi Sánchez and Sanyo Gutiérrez, reached their third consecutive final (and fourth in five tournaments), with Sanyo having the chance to reach the top of the rankings should they win. In the decisive match, Maxi and Sanyo were defeated by Alejandro Galán and Matias Diaz, with the duo that claiming their first title together and the first of Galán's career and Díaz's first in Valladolid.

By winning the first final of his career, Galán secured the first trophy of his carrer at the age of 22. With Galán's victory, Sanyo Gutiérrez would have to wait until the next tournament for the chance to overtake Fernando Belasteguín and Pablo Lima and reach the top of the world rankings.

== Head-to-head record between teams ranked in the top 4 during the season ==
=== Men's ===
| Record | Belasteguín–Lima | Maxi–Sanyo | J.M. Díaz–Paquito | Gutiérrez–Stupaczuk |
| Belasteguín–Lima | — | — | 1–0 | 1–0 |
| Maxi–Sanyo | — | — | 2–0 | 1–0 |
| J.M. Díaz–Paquito | 0–1 | 0–2 | — | — |
| Gutiérrez–Stupaczuk | 0–1 | 0–1 | — | — |

=== Women's ===
| Record | Majo–Mapi | Marrero–Salazar | Triay–Sainz | Amatriain–Llaguno | Former Pairs | Ariana–Ortega |
| Majo–Mapi | — | 0–1 | 1–3 | 3–0 | | 1–0 |
| Marrero–Salazar | 1–0 | — | 1–3 | 1–0 | | 2–0 |
| Triay–Sainz | 3–1 | 3–1 | — | — | | — |
| Amatriain–Llaguno | 0–3 | 0–1 | — | — | | 1–1 |
| Former Pairs | | | | | | |
| Ariana–Ortega | 0–1 | 0–2 | — | 1–1 | | — |

== Draws ==
=== Men's Bracket ===
Round of 32
1 | (Argentina) Belasteguín / (Brazil) Lima
Bye
(Argentina) F. Quiles / (Brazil) F. Gomes | 6 | 1 | 7
(Spain) B. Yribarren / (Argentina) J. Escalante | 3 | 6 | 6
(Spain) M. Piñeiro / (Spain) W. Lahoz | 6 | 7
(Spain) G. Rubio / (Spain) E. Moreno | 4 | 5
(Argentina) A. Silingo / (Spain) A. Ruiz | 4 | 7 | 4
(Argentina) J.C. Belluati / (Spain) Lebrón | 6 | 6 | 6
(Spain) Galán / (Spain) M. Díaz | 6 | 7
(Spain) J. Ruiz / (Spain) U. Botello | 0 | 6
(Argentina) G. Tamame / (Spain) T. Bueno | 6 | 3 | 3
(Spain) J. Rico / (Spain) V. Ruiz | 4 | 6 | 6
Q | (Spain) G. Company / (Spain) R. Rivera | 7 | 4 | 7
(Spain) J.G. Diestro / (Argentina) S. Nerone | 6 | 6 | 6
Bye
4 | (Argentina) C. Gutiérrez / (Argentina) Stupaczuk
3 | (Spain) J.M. Díaz / (Spain) Paquito
Bye
(Uruguay) D. Ramos / (Spain) R. Méndez | 6 | 6 | 6
(Argentina) A. Patiniotis / (Spain) J. Muñoz | 4 | 7 | 4
(Spain) J. Mieres / (Argentina) M. Lamperti | 6 | 6
(Brazil) M. Jardim / (Argentina) Tapia | 1 | 3
(Spain) A. Santana / (Spain) I. Gadea | 7 | 6 | 6
(Brazil) L. Bergamini / (Brazil) L. Campagnolo | 6 | 7 | 4
(Argentina) L. Capra / (Argentina) R. Moyano | 6 | 6
(Argentina) M. Grabiel / (Spain) P. Lijó | 4 | 4
(Spain) A. Cepero / (Argentina) G. Díaz | 1 | 6 | 7
(Argentina) F. Poggi / (Argentina) G. Reca | 6 | 4 | 6
(Argentina) M. Nicoletti / (Spain) P.A. Martínez | 6 | 6
(Argentina) A. Allemandi / (Spain) J. Garrido | 3 | 4
Bye
2 | (Argentina) Maxi / (Argentina) Sanyo

Round of 16
1 | (Argentina) Belasteguín / (Brazil) Lima | 6 | 6 | 3
(Argentina) F. Quiles / (Brazil) F. Gomes | 2 | 7 | 6
(Spain) M. Piñeiro / (Spain) W. Lahoz | 6 | 7 | 4
(Argentina) J.C. Belluati / (Spain) Lebrón | 7 | 6 | 6
(Spain) Galán / (Spain) M. Díaz | 6 | 6
(Spain) J. Rico / (Spain) V. Ruiz | 4 | 4
(Spain) G. Company / (Spain) R. Rivera | 4 | 6 | 7
4 | (Argentina) C. Gutiérrez / (Argentina) Stupaczuk | 6 | 3 | 5
3 | (Spain) J.M. Díaz / (Spain) Paquito | 4 | 7 | 7
(Uruguay) D. Ramos / (Spain) R. Méndez | 6 | 6 | 6
(Spain) J. Mieres / (Argentina) M. Lamperti | 6 | 7
(Spain) A. Santana / (Spain) I. Gadea | 3 | 6
(Argentina) L. Capra / (Argentina) R. Moyano | 6 | 6
(Spain) A. Cepero / (Argentina) G. Díaz | 3 | 1
(Argentina) M. Nicoletti / (Spain) P.A. Martínez | 4 | 3
2 | (Argentina) Maxi / (Argentina) Sanyo | 6 | 6

Quarter-Final
(Argentina) F. Quiles / (Brazil) F. Gomes | 3 | 2
(Argentina) J.C. Belluati / (Spain) Lebrón | 6 | 6
(Spain) Galán / (Spain) M. Díaz | 6 | 6
(Spain) G. Company / (Spain) R. Rivera | 1 | 3
3 | (Spain) J.M. Díaz / (Spain) Paquito | 6 | 6 | 6
(Spain) J. Mieres / (Argentina) M. Lamperti | 1 | 7 | 7
(Argentina) L. Capra / (Argentina) R. Moyano | 7 | 5 | 6
2 | (Argentina) Maxi / (Argentina) Sanyo | 6 | 7 | 7

Semi-Finals
(Argentina) J.C. Belluati / (Spain) Lebrón
(Spain) Galán / (Spain) M. Díaz
(Spain) J. Mieres / (Argentina) M. Lamperti
2 | (Argentina) Maxi / (Argentina) Sanyo

Finals
(Spain) Galán / (Spain) M. Díaz | 7 | 3 | 6
2 | (Argentina) Maxi / (Argentina) Sanyo | 5 | 6 | 3

=== Women's Bracket ===
Round of 32
1 | (Spain) Majo / (Spain) Mapi
Bye
(Spain) I. Domínguez / (Spain) V. Alonso | 6 | 6
Q | (Spain) C. Carrascosa / (Spain) N. Traviesa | 4 | 1
(Spain) A. Blanco / (Spain) B. Caldera | 6 | 6
(Spain) E. Ramírez / (Spain) N. Marquez | 3 | 3
(France) L. Clergue / (Spain) M. Truchado | 5 | 1
(Spain) C. Navarro / (Argentina) C. Reiter | 7 | 6
(Spain) A. Sánchez / (Spain) M. Ortega | 6 | 6
(Spain) A.F. de Ossó / (Spain) M. Gabarrus | 2 | 3
(Spain) M. Gonzalez / (Spain) S. Vidal | 6 | 6 | 3
(Venezuela) A. Cali / (Spain) I. Egaña | 7 | 3 | 6
(Spain) S. Hernández / (Spain) V. Virseda | 4 | 6 | 7
(Spain) A. Galán / (Spain) M. Villalba | 6 | 2 | 5
Bye
4 | (Spain) E. Amatriain / (Spain) P. Llaguno
3 | (Spain) A. Salazar / (Spain) M. Marrero
Bye
(Spain) A. Cantin / (Spain) N. Rodriguez | 6 | 6
(Spain) P. Josemaría / (Argentina) V. Pavón | 4 | 1
Q | (France) A. Collombon / (Spain) S. Pujals | 6 | 4 | 3
(Argentina) A. Osoro / (Argentina) N. Brito | 4 | 6 | 6
(Portugal) A.C. Nogueira / (Argentina) Delfina | 6 | 4 | 6
(Spain) B. González / (Argentina) C. Tenorio | 4 | 6 | 2
(Spain) T. Navarro / (Spain) V. Iglesias | 6 | 6
(Argentina) G. Bartomioli / (Spain) S. Ruiz | 1 | 1
(Spain) L. Alonso / (Argentina) V. Riera | 5 | 2
(Spain) C. Mesa / (Spain) L. Martínez | 7 | 6
Q | (Spain) E. Fernández / (Spain) J. Castelló | 0 | 4
(Spain) M. Talaván / (Spain) T. Icardo | 6 | 6
Bye
2 | (Spain) Gemma / (Spain) L. Sainz

Round of 16
1 | (Spain) Majo / (Spain) Mapi | 6 | 6
(Spain) I. Domínguez / (Spain) V. Alonso | 1 | 1
(Spain) A. Blanco / (Spain) B. Caldera | 1 | 4
(Spain) C. Navarro / (Argentina) C. Reiter | 6 | 6
(Spain) A. Sánchez / (Spain) M. Ortega | 6 | 6
(Venezuela) A. Cali / (Spain) I. Egaña | 1 | 2
(Spain) S. Hernández / (Spain) V. Virseda | 1 | 1
4 | (Spain) E. Amatriain / (Spain) P. Llaguno | 6 | 6
3 | (Spain) A. Salazar / (Spain) M. Marrero | 6 | 6
(Spain) A. Cantin / (Spain) N. Rodriguez | 0 | 1
(Argentina) A. Osoro / (Argentina) N. Brito | 2 | 6
(Portugal) A.C. Nogueira / (Argentina) Delfina | 6 | 7
(Spain) T. Navarro / (Spain) V. Iglesias | 4 | 5
(Spain) C. Mesa / (Spain) L. Martínez | 6 | 7
(Spain) M. Talaván / (Spain) T. Icardo | 4 | 3
2 | (Spain) Gemma / (Spain) L. Sainz | 6 | 6

Quarter-Final
1 | (Spain) Majo / (Spain) Mapi | 4 | 6 | 6
(Spain) C. Navarro / (Argentina) C. Reiter | 6 | 2 | 3
(Spain) A. Sánchez / (Spain) M. Ortega | 6 | 6
4 | (Spain) E. Amatriain / (Spain) P. Llaguno | 4 | 2
3 | (Spain) A. Salazar / (Spain) M. Marrero | 6 | 6
(Portugal) A.C. Nogueira / (Argentina) Delfina | 2 | 1
(Spain) C. Mesa / (Spain) L. Martínez | 2 | 1
2 | (Spain) Gemma / (Spain) L. Sainz | 6 | 6

Semi-Finals
1 | (Spain) Majo / (Spain) Mapi | 7 | 4 | 6
(Spain) A. Sánchez / (Spain) M. Ortega | 6 | 6 | 3
3 | (Spain) A. Salazar / (Spain) M. Marrero | 4 | 3
2 | (Spain) Gemma / (Spain) L. Sainz | 6 | 6

Finals
1 | (Spain) Majo / (Spain) Mapi | 4 | 6 | 3
2 | (Spain) Gemma / (Spain) L. Sainz | 6 | 4 | 6

== Results ==
=== Round of 32 ===
Men's

| Date | Winners | Score | Opponent | Refs. |
|---|---|---|---|---|
| 20/6/2018 | (Argentina) Federico Quiles (Brazil) Francisco Gomes | 6–3 / 1–6 / 7–6 | (Spain) Borja Yribarren (Argentina) Javier Escalante | |
| 20/6/2018 | (Spain) Martin Sanchez Piñeiro (Spain) Willy Lahoz | 6–4 / 7–5 | (Spain) Gonzalo Rubio (Spain) Ernesto Moreno | |
| 20/6/2018 | (Argentina) Juan Cruz Belluati (Spain) Juan Lebrón | 6–4 / 6–7 / 6–4 | (Argentina) Agustin Gomez Silingo (Spain) Alejandro Ruiz | |
| 20/6/2018 | (Spain) Alejandro Galán (Spain) Matías Díaz | 6–0 / 7–6 | (Spain) Javi Ruiz (Spain) Uri Botello | |
| 20/6/2018 | (Spain) José Rico (Spain) Víctor Ruiz | 4–6 / 6–3 / 6–3 | (Argentina) German Tamame (Spain) Toni Bueno | |
| 20/6/2018 | (Spain) Gerard Company (Spain) Rubén Rivera | 7–6 / 4–6 / 7–6 | (Spain) José García Diestro (Argentina) Sebastián Nerone | |
| 20/6/2018 | (Uruguay) Diego Ramos (Spain) Rafael Méndez | 6–4 / 6–7 / 6–4 | (Argentina) Aris Patiniotis (Spain) Jordi Muñoz | |
| 20/6/2018 | (Spain) Juani Mieres (Argentina) Miguel Lamperti | 6–1 / 6–3 | (Argentina) Agustín Tapia (Brazil) Marcello Jardim | |
| 20/6/2018 | (Spain) Aday Santana (Spain) Nacho Gadea | 7–6 / 6–7 / 6–4 | (Brazil) Lucas Bergamini (Brazil) Lucas Campagnolo | |
| 20/6/2018 | (Argentina) Lucho Capra (Argentina) Ramiro Moyano | 6–4 / 6–4 | (Argentina) Maxi Grabiel (Spain) Pablo Lijó | |
| 20/6/2018 | (Spain) Álvaro Cepero (Argentina) Godo Díaz | 1–6 / 6–4 / 7–6 | (Argentina) Fernando Poggi (Argentina) Gaby Reca | |
| 20/6/2018 | (Argentina) Matías Nicoletti (Spain) Pedro Alonso Martínez | 6–3 / 6–4 | (Argentina) Adrián Allemandi (Spain) Javi Garrido | |

Women's

| Date | Winners | Score | Opponent | Refs. |
|---|---|---|---|---|
| 20/6/2018 | (Spain) Isabel Domínguez (Spain) Vanesa Alonso | 6–4 / 6–1 | (Spain) Cristina Carrascosa (Spain) Nicole Traviesa Mola | |
| 20/6/2018 | (Spain) Alicia Blanco Rojo (Spain) Beatriz Caldera | 6–3 / 6–3 | (Spain) Elena Ramírez (Spain) Noelia Márquez | |
| 20/6/2018 | (Spain) Carolina Navarro (Argentina) Cecilia Reiter | 7–5 / 6–1 | (Spain) Andrea Medina (France) Laura Clergue | |
| 20/6/2018 | (Spain) Ariana Sánchez (Spain) Marta Ortega | 6–2 / 6–3 | (Spain) Ana Fernandez de Ossó (Spain) Maite Gabarrus Alonso | |
| 20/6/2018 | (Venezuela) Ana Seijas Cali (Spain) Idoia Egaña | 7–6 / 3–6 / 6–3 | (Spain) Marta Gonzalez (Spain) Silvia López Vidal | |
| 20/6/2018 | (Spain) Sandra Hernández (Spain) Verónica Virseda | 4–6 / 6–2 / 7–5 | (Spain) Alba Galán (Spain) Maria Villalba | |
| 20/6/2018 | (Spain) Angela Caro Cantin (Spain) Nuria Rodriguez | 6–4 / 6–1 | (Spain) Paula Josemaria (Argentina) Valeria Pavón | |
| 20/6/2018 | (Argentina) Aranzazu Osoro (Argentina) Nela Brito | 4–6 / 6–4 / 6–3 | (France) Alix Collombon (Spain) Sara Pujals | |
| 20/6/2018 | (Portugal) Ana Catarina Nogueira (Argentina) Delfina Brea | 6–4 / 4–6 / 6–2 | (Spain) Beatriz González (Argentina) Catalina Tenorio | |
| 20/6/2018 | (Spain) Teresa Navarro (Spain) Victoria Iglesias | 6–1 / 6–1 | (Argentina) Gabriela Bartomioli (Spain) Sara Ruiz | |
| 20/6/2018 | (Spain) Carla Mesa (Spain) Lucía Martínez | 7–5 / 6–2 | (Spain) Lorena Alonso (Argentina) Virginia Riera | |
| 20/6/2018 | (Spain) Marta Talaván (Spain) Tamara Icardo | 6–0 / 6–4 | (Spain) Estela Fernández (Spain) Jessica Castelló | |

=== Round of 16 ===
Men's

| Date | Winners | Score | Opponent | Refs. |
|---|---|---|---|---|
| 21/6/2018 | (Argentina) Federico Quiles (Brazil) Francisco Gomes | 2–6 / 7–6 / 6–3 | (Argentina) Fernando Belasteguín (Brazil) Pablo Lima | |
| 21/6/2018 | (Argentina) Juan Cruz Belluati (Spain) Juan Lebrón | 7–6 / 6–7 / 6–4 | (Spain) Martin Sanchez Piñeiro (Spain) Willy Lahoz | |
| 21/6/2018 | (Spain) Alejandro Galán (Spain) Matías Díaz | 6–4 / 6–4 | (Spain) José Rico (Spain) Víctor Ruiz | |
| 21/6/2018 | (Spain) Gerard Company (Spain) Rubén Rivera | 4–6 / 6–3 / 7–5 | (Argentina) Cristian Gutiérrez (Argentina) Franco Stupaczuk | |
| 21/6/2018 | (Spain) Juan Martin Díaz (Spain) Paquito Navarro | 4–6 / 7–6 / 7–6 | (Uruguay) Diego Ramos (Spain) Rafael Méndez | |
| 21/6/2018 | (Spain) Juani Mieres (Argentina) Miguel Lamperti | 6–3 / 7–6 | (Spain) Aday Santana (Spain) Nacho Gadea | |
| 21/6/2018 | (Argentina) Lucho Capra (Argentina) Ramiro Moyano | 6–3 / 6–1 | (Spain) Álvaro Cepero (Argentina) Godo Díaz | |
| 21/6/2018 | (Argentina) Maxi Sánchez (Argentina) Sanyo Gutiérrez | 6–4 / 6–3 | (Argentina) Matías Nicoletti (Spain) Pedro Alonso Martínez | |

Women's

| Date | Winners | Score | Opponent | Refs. |
|---|---|---|---|---|
| 21/6/2018 | (Spain) Majo Sanchez (Spain) Mapi Sanchez | 6–1 / 6–1 | (Spain) Isabel Domínguez (Spain) Vanesa Alonso | |
| 21/6/2018 | (Spain) Carolina Navarro (Argentina) Cecilia Reiter | 6–1 / 6–4 | (Spain) Alicia Blanco Rojo (Spain) Beatriz Caldera | |
| 21/6/2018 | (Spain) Ariana Sánchez (Spain) Marta Ortega | 6–1 / 6–2 | (Venezuela) Ana Seijas Cali (Spain) Idoia Egaña | |
| 21/6/2018 | (Spain) Elisabeth Amatriain (Spain) Patricia Llaguno | 6–1 / 6–1 | (Spain) Sandra Hernández (Spain) Verónica Virseda | |
| 21/6/2018 | (Spain) Alejandra Salazar (Spain) Marta Marrero | 6–0 / 6–1 | (Spain) Angela Caro Cantin (Spain) Nuria Rodriguez | |
| 21/6/2018 | (Portugal) Ana Catarina Nogueira (Argentina) Delfina Brea | 6–2 / 7–6 | (Argentina) Aranzazu Osoro (Argentina) Nela Brito | |
| 21/6/2018 | (Spain) Carla Mesa (Spain) Lucía Martínez | 6–4 / 7–5 | (Spain) Teresa Navarro (Spain) Victoria Iglesias | |
| 21/6/2018 | (Spain) Gemma Triay (Spain) Lucía Sainz | 6–4 / 6–3 | (Spain) Marta Talaván (Spain) Tamara Icardo | |

=== Quarter-Finals ===
Men's

| Date | Winners | Score | Opponent | Refs. |
|---|---|---|---|---|
| 22/6/2018 | (Argentina) Juan Cruz Belluati (Spain) Juan Lebrón | 6–3 / 6–2 | (Argentina) Federico Quiles (Brazil) Francisco Gomes | |
| 22/6/2018 | (Spain) Alejandro Galán (Spain) Matías Díaz | 6–1 / 6–3 | (Spain) Gerard Company (Spain) Rubén Rivera | |
| 22/6/2018 | (Spain) Juani Mieres (Argentina) Miguel Lamperti | 1–6 / 7–6 / 7–6 | (Spain) Juan Martin Díaz (Spain) Paquito Navarro | |
| 22/6/2018 | (Argentina) Maxi Sánchez (Argentina) Sanyo Gutiérrez | 6–7 / 7–5 / 7–6 | (Argentina) Lucho Capra (Argentina) Ramiro Moyano | |

Women's

| Date | Winners | Score | Opponent | Refs. |
|---|---|---|---|---|
| 22/6/2018 | (Spain) Majo Sanchez (Spain) Mapi Sanchez | 4–6 / 6–2 / 6–3 | (Spain) Carolina Navarro (Argentina) Cecilia Reiter | |
| 22/6/2018 | (Spain) Ariana Sánchez (Spain) Marta Ortega | 6–4 / 6–2 | (Spain) Elisabeth Amatriain (Spain) Patricia Llaguno | |
| 22/6/2018 | (Spain) Alejandra Salazar (Spain) Marta Marrero | 6–2 / 6–1 | (Portugal) Ana Catarina Nogueira (Argentina) Delfina Brea | |
| 22/6/2018 | (Spain) Gemma Triay (Spain) Lucía Sainz | 6–2 / 6–1 | (Spain) Carla Mesa (Spain) Lucía Martínez | |

=== Semi-Finals ===
Men's

| Date | Winners | Score | Opponent | Refs. |
|---|---|---|---|---|
| 23/6/2018 | (Spain) Alejandro Galán (Spain) Matías Díaz | 7–6 / 6–4 | (Argentina) Juan Cruz Belluati (Spain) Juan Lebrón | |
| 23/6/2018 | (Argentina) Maxi Sánchez (Argentina) Sanyo Gutiérrez | 6–1 / 6–2 | (Spain) Juani Mieres (Argentina) Miguel Lamperti | |

Women's

| Date | Winners | Score | Opponent | Refs. |
|---|---|---|---|---|
| 23/6/2018 | (Spain) Majo Sanchez (Spain) Mapi Sanchez | 7–6 / 4–6 / 6–3 | (Spain) Ariana Sánchez (Spain) Marta Ortega | |
| 23/6/2018 | (Spain) Gemma Triay (Spain) Lucía Sainz | 6–4 / 6–3 | (Spain) Alejandra Salazar (Spain) Marta Marrero | |

=== Finals ===
Men's

| Date | Winners | Score | Opponent | Refs. |
|---|---|---|---|---|
| 24/6/2018 | (Spain) Alejandro Galán (Spain) Matías Díaz | 7–5 / 3–6 / 6–3 | (Argentina) Maxi Sánchez (Argentina) Sanyo Gutiérrez | |

Women's

| Date | Winners | Score | Opponent | Refs. |
|---|---|---|---|---|
| 24/6/2018 | (Spain) Gemma Triay (Spain) Lucía Sainz | 6–4 / 4–6 / 6–3 | (Spain) Majo Sanchez (Spain) Mapi Sanchez | |
