= 2018 WPT Mijas Open =

World Padel Tour tournament held in Mijas, Spain

- Date: 6 – 12 August
- Edition: 2nd
- Category: Open
- Location: Mijas, Spain
- Venue: Recinto Ferial Cala de Mijas

Champions
- Men's doubles: (Argentina) Maxi Sánchez (Argentina) Sanyo Gutiérrez
- Women's doubles: (Spain) Mapi Sánchez (Spain) Majo Sánchez

Chronology

The 2018 Mijas Open (officially 2018 World Padel Tour Mijas Open) was the eight tournament of the sixth season organized by World Padel Tour, the most prestigious padel circuit at the time.

In the women's category, a pair ranked outside the top three reached the final for the second consecutive time this season, after Elisabeth Amatriain and Patricia Llaguno eliminated Gemma Triay and Lucia Sainz in the quarterfinals en route to the final. In the title match, the twins Majo and Mapi Sánchez, the world number ones, defeated Amatriain and Llaguno, thereby securing their third title of the season and successfully defending the title they had won in Mijas the previous year.

In the men's category, Juan Lebrón and Juan Cruz Belluati capitalized on the withdrawal of world number one pair Fernando Belasteguín and Pablo Lima, who retired during their quarterfinal match, to reach their second final of the season. In the decisive match, Maxi Sánchez and Sanyo Gutiérrez took full advantage of their rivals' absence, defeating Belluati and Lebrón to claim their fourth title of the year (both men first in Mijas) and shortening the gap on the world number one spot.

== Relevant Data ==
=== End of an era ===
With Fernando Belasteguín and Pablo Lima retiring in the quarterfinals, it marked the last time Belasteguín would enter a tournament as the world number 1, or as part of the world's top-ranked pair, thereby ending a reign that had lasted uninterrupted since 2002 (totaling 15 consecutive years, or 16 seasons).

=== Sanyo and Maxi narrow the gap with Bela and Lima to 2,000 points ===
Due to Belasteguín's injury, which would prevent him from playing in the upcoming tournament in Andorra, Lima would have to defend the top ranking spot on his own. In Andorra, Belasteguín and Lima were each defending 1,000 points, and the pair's absence would cost them 2,000 points, allowing Sanyo Gutiérrez (defending 600 points) and Maxi Sánchez to take another step toward challenging their rivals' dominance.

Furthermore, in a ranking based exclusively on points from the eight tournaments played this year, Maxi and Sanyo are the clear leaders with 6,680 points each, having won four titles and competed in six finals. Belasteguín and Lima trail by nearly 2,000 points with a total of 4,760, having won three tournaments, lost one, and havent finished the Mijas event.

== Head-to-head record between teams ranked in the top 4 during the season ==
=== Men's ===
Record	Belasteguín–Lima	Maxi–Sanyo	J.M. Díaz–Paquito	Galán–M. Díaz	Former Pairs	Gutiérrez–Stupaczuk
Belasteguín–Lima	—	1–0	2–0	1–0		1–0
Maxi–Sanyo	0–1	—	3–0	2–3		2–0
J.M. Díaz–Paquito	0–2	0–3	—	2–1		—
Galán–M. Díaz	0–1	3–2	1–2	—		1–1
Former Pairs						
Gutiérrez–Stupaczuk	0–1	0–2	—	1–1		—

=== Women's ===
Record	Majo–Mapi	Marrero–Salazar	Triay–Sainz	Ariana–Ortega	Former Pairs	Amatriain–Llaguno
Majo–Mapi	—	2–1	2–3	1–0		4–0
Marrero–Salazar	1–2	—	1–3	2–0		1–0
Triay–Sainz	3–2	3–1	—	1–0		0–1
Ariana–Ortega	0–1	0–2	0–1	—		2–1
Former Pairs						
Amatriain–Llaguno	0–4	0–1	1–0	1–2		—

== Draws ==
=== Men's Bracket ===
Round of 32
1	(Argentina) Belasteguín / (Brazil) Lima
Bye
(Spain) G. Rubio / (Spain) E. Moreno	6	6
(Spain) M. Piñeiro / (Spain) W. Lahoz	4	1
(Argentina) F. Quiles / (Brazil) F. Gomes	6	6
(Uruguay) D. Ramos / (Spain) R. Méndez	7	7
(Argentina) A. Allemandi / (Spain) J. Garrido	3	3
(Argentina) J.C. Belluati / (Spain) Lebrón	6	6
(Spain) J. Ruiz / (Spain) U. Botello	6	5	6
(Argentina) L. Capra / (Argentina) R. Moyano	4	7	1
(Argentina) A. Silingo / (Spain) A. Ruiz	6	6
(Brazil) M. Jardim / (Spain) Momo	4	4
(Spain) J.G. Diestro / (Spain) M. Piñeiro	6	6
(Spain) A. Blanco / (Spain) J. Vazquez	2	4
Bye
3	(Spain) J.M. Díaz / (Spain) Paquito
4	(Spain) Galán / (Spain) M. Díaz
Bye
(Spain) Á. Cepero / (Argentina) S. Nerone	7	6
(Argentina) C.G. Gutiérrez / (Argentina) J. Vázquez	6	2
(Brazil) L. Bergamini / (Brazil) L. Campagnolo	6	4
(Spain) J. Ruiz / (Spain) M. Solbes	7	6
(Argentina) M. Grabiel / (Spain) P. Lijó	2	4
(Spain) J. Mieres / (Argentina) M. Lamperti	6	6
(Argentina) C. Gutiérrez / (Argentina) Stupaczuk	6	6
(Argentina) Godo Díaz / (Argentina) G. Tamame	3	2
(Argentina) M. Nicoletti / (Spain) P.A. Martínez	7	6	1
(Argentina) A. Patiniotis / (Spain) J. Muñoz	6	7	6
(Spain) A. Santana / (Spain) I. Gadea	7	7
(Spain) J. Rico / (Spain) V. Ruiz	5	6
Bye
2	(Argentina) Maxi / (Argentina) Sanyo

Round of 16
1	(Argentina) Belasteguín / (Brazil) Lima	6	6	6
(Spain) G. Rubio / (Spain) E. Moreno	7	1	1
(Uruguay) D. Ramos / (Spain) R. Méndez	4	7	1
(Argentina) J.C. Belluati / (Spain) Lebrón	6	6	6
(Spain) J. Ruiz / (Spain) U. Botello	7	6
(Argentina) A. Silingo / (Spain) A. Ruiz	6	2
(Spain) J.G. Diestro / (Spain) M. Piñeiro	3	2
3	(Spain) J.M. Díaz / (Spain) Paquito	6	6
4	(Spain) Galán / (Spain) M. Díaz	6	7
(Spain) Á. Cepero / (Argentina) S. Nerone	4	5
(Spain) J. Ruiz / (Spain) M. Solbes	3	3
(Spain) J. Mieres / (Argentina) M. Lamperti	6	6
(Argentina) C. Gutiérrez / (Argentina) Stupaczuk	6	2
(Argentina) A. Patiniotis / (Spain) J. Muñoz	1	1
(Spain) A. Santana / (Spain) I. Gadea	5	4
2	(Argentina) Maxi / (Argentina) Sanyo	7	6

Quarter-Final
1	(Argentina) Belasteguín / (Brazil) Lima
(Argentina) J.C. Belluati / (Spain) Lebrón	*
(Spain) J. Ruiz / (Spain) U. Botello	7	6
3	(Spain) J.M. Díaz / (Spain) Paquito	5	4
4	(Spain) Galán / (Spain) M. Díaz	6	6
(Spain) J. Mieres / (Argentina) M. Lamperti	4	2
(Argentina) C. Gutiérrez / (Argentina) Stupaczuk	1	4
2	(Argentina) Maxi / (Argentina) Sanyo	6	6

Semi-Finals
(Argentina) J.C. Belluati / (Spain) Lebrón	7	7
(Spain) J. Ruiz / (Spain) U. Botello	6	5
4	(Spain) Galán / (Spain) M. Díaz	4	6
2	(Argentina) Maxi / Sanyo	6	7

Finals
(Argentina) J.C. Belluati / (Spain) Lebrón	2	5
2	(Argentina) Maxi / (Argentina) Sanyo	6	7

=== Women's Bracket ===
Round of 32
1	(Spain) Majo / (Spain) Mapi
Bye
(Spain) P. Josemaria / (Argentina) V. Pavón	6	1
(Portugal) A.C. Nogueira / (Argentina) Delfina	7	6
(Spain) A. Blanco / (Spain) B. Caldera	3	6	1
(Argentina) A. Berl / (Spain) N. Márquez	6	4	0
(Spain) L. Alonso / (Argentina) V. Riera	6	5
(Spain) T. Navarro / (Spain) V. Iglesias	7	7
(Spain) C. Navarro / (Argentina) C. Reiter	6	6
(Spain) M. Talaván / (Spain) T. Icardo	4	2
(Spain) E. Ramírez / (Spain) S. Vidal	6	7
Q	(Spain) A. Rico / (Spain) I. Arzamendi	4	6
(Spain) P. Hermida / (Spain) V. Virseda	6	0
(Argentina) A. Osoro / (Argentina) N. Brito	7	6
Bye
3	(Spain) A. Salazar / (Spain) M. Marrero
4	(Spain) A. Sánchez / (Spain) M. Ortega
Bye
(Spain) A. Cantin / (Spain) N. Rodriguez	4	6
(Spain) C. Mesa / (Spain) L. Martínez	6	7
Q	(Spain) N. Rovira / (Spain) R. Aguilar	2	7	6
Q	(Argentina) C. Paz / (Spain) L. Torres	6	5	3
(Spain) A. Galán / (Spain) M. Villalba	6	6	3
(Spain) B. González / (Argentina) C. Tenorio	7	3	6
(Spain) E. Amatriain / (Spain) P. Llaguno	6	6
(Spain) I. Domínguez / (Spain) V. Alonso	1	1
(France) A. Collombon / (Spain) S. Pujals	2	2
(Spain) A.F. de Ossó / (Spain) M. Gabarrus	6	6
Q	(Spain) M. Truchado / (Portugal) S. Araújo
(Spain) A. Medina / (France) L. Clergue
Bye
2	(Spain) Gemma / (Spain) L. Sainz

Round of 16
1	(Spain) Majo / (Spain) Mapi	6	7
(Portugal) A.C. Nogueira / (Argentina) Delfina	4	6
(Spain) A. Blanco / (Spain) B. Caldera	1	2
(Spain) T. Navarro / (Spain) V. Iglesias	6	6
(Spain) C. Navarro / (Argentina) C. Reiter	6	6
(Spain) E. Ramírez / (Spain) S. Vidal	1	0
(Argentina) A. Osoro / (Argentina) N. Brito	3	0
3	(Spain) A. Salazar / (Spain) M. Marrero	6	6
4	(Spain) A. Sánchez / (Spain) M. Ortega	6	6
(Spain) C. Mesa / (Spain) L. Martínez	3	0
Q	(Spain) N. Rovira / (Spain) R. Aguilar	6	1	2
(Spain) B. González / (Argentina) C. Tenorio	3	6	6
(Spain) E. Amatriain / (Spain) P. Llaguno	6	6
(Spain) A.F. de Ossó / (Spain) M. Gabarrus	2	4
Q	(Spain) M. Truchado / (Portugal) S. Araújo	3	2
2	(Spain) Gemma / (Spain) L. Sainz	6	6

Quarter-Final
1	(Spain) Majo / (Spain) Mapi	6	2	*
(Spain) T. Navarro / (Spain) V. Iglesias	2	1
(Spain) C. Navarro / (Argentina) C. Reiter	0	4
3	(Spain) A. Salazar / (Spain) M. Marrero	6	6
4	(Spain) A. Sánchez / (Spain) M. Ortega	6	6	2
(Spain) B. González / (Argentina) C. Tenorio	3	7	6
(Spain) E. Amatriain / (Spain) P. Llaguno	7	6
2	(Spain) Gemma / (Spain) L. Sainz	5	4

Semi-Finals
1	(Spain) Majo / (Spain) Mapi	7	6
3	(Spain) A. Salazar / (Spain) M. Marrero	6	3
(Spain) B. González / (Argentina) C. Tenorio	2	7	0
(Spain) E. Amatriain / (Spain) P. Llaguno	6	6	6

Finals
1	(Spain) Majo / (Spain) Mapi	6	6
(Spain) E. Amatriain / (Spain) P. Llaguno	1	3

== Results ==
=== Round of 32 ===
Men's

Date	Winners	Score	Opponent	Refs.
8/8/2018	(Spain) Gonzalo Rubio (Spain) Ernesto Moreno	6–4 / 6–1	(Argentina) Juan Manuel Restivo (Spain) Willy Lahoz	
8/8/2018	(Uruguay) Diego Ramos (Spain) Rafael Méndez	7–6 / 7–6	(Argentina) Federico Quiles (Brazil) Francisco Gomes	
8/8/2018	(Argentina) Juan Cruz Belluati (Spain) Juan Lebrón	6–3 / 6–3	(Argentina) Adrián Allemandi (Spain) Javi Garrido	
8/8/2018	(Spain) Javi Ruiz (Spain) Uri Botello	6–4 / 5–7 / 6–1	(Argentina) Lucho Capra (Argentina) Ramiro Moyano	
8/8/2018	(Argentina) Agustin Gomez Silingo (Spain) Alejandro Ruiz	6–4 / 6–4	(Brazil) Marcello Jardim (Spain) Momo	
8/8/2018	(Spain) José García Diestro (Spain) Martin Sanchez Piñeiro	6–2 / 6–4	(Spain) Adrián Blanco (Spain) Javier Martinez Vazquez	
8/8/2018	(Spain) Álvaro Cepero (Argentina) Sebastián Nerone	7–6 / 6–2	(Argentina) Cristian German Gutiérrez (Argentina) Juan Manuel Vázquez	
8/8/2018	(Spain) Jorge Ruiz (Spain) Miguel Solbes	7–6 / 6–4	(Brazil) Lucas Bergamini (Brazil) Lucas Campagnolo	
8/8/2018	(Spain) Juani Mieres (Argentina) Miguel Lamperti	6–2 / 6–4	(Argentina) Maxi Grabiel (Spain) Pablo Lijó	
8/8/2018	(Argentina) Cristian Gutiérrez (Argentina) Franco Stupaczuk	6–3 / 6–2	(Argentina) Germán Tamame (Argentina) Godo Díaz	
8/8/2018	(Argentina) Aris Patiniotis (Spain) Jordi Muñoz	6–7 / 7–6 / 6–1	(Argentina) Matías Nicoletti (Spain) Pedro Alonso Martínez	
8/8/2018	(Spain) Aday Santana (Spain) Nacho Gadea	7–5 / 7–6	(Spain) José Rico (Spain) Victor Ruiz	

Women's

Date	Winners	Score	Opponent	Refs.
8/8/2018	(Portugal) Ana Catarina Nogueira (Argentina) Delfina Brea	7–6 / 6–1	(Spain) Paula Josemaria (Argentina) Valeria Pavón	
8/8/2018	(Spain) Alicia Blanco Rojo (Spain) Beatriz Caldera	3–6 / 6–4 / 1–0 / W.O.	(Spain) Alicia Lilian Berl (Spain) Noelia Márquez	
8/8/2018	(Spain) Teresa Navarro (Spain) Victoria Iglesias	7–6 / 7–5	(Spain) Lorena Alonso (Argentina) Virginia Riera	
8/8/2018	(Spain) Carolina Navarro (Argentina) Cecilia Reiter	6–4 / 6–2	(Spain) Marta Talaván (Spain) Tamara Icardo	
8/8/2018	(Spain) Elena Ramírez (Spain) Silvia López Vidal	6–4 / 7–6	(Spain) Ainhoa Rico Martín (Spain) Irene Arzamendi García	
8/8/2018	(Argentina) Aranzazu Osoro (Argentina) Nela Brito	7–6 / 6–0	(Spain) Paula Hermida (Spain) Verónica Virseda	
8/8/2018	(Spain) Carla Mesa (Spain) Lucía Martínez	6–4 / 7–6	(Spain) Angela Caro Cantin (Spain) Nuria Rodriguez	
8/8/2018	(Spain) Nuria Rovira (Spain) Raquel Segura Aguilar	2–6 / 7–5 / 6–3	(Argentina) Celeste Paz (Spain) Laia Bonilla Torres	
8/8/2018	(Spain) Beatriz González (Argentina) Catalina Tenorio	7–6 / 3–6 / 6–3	(Spain) Alba Galán (Spain) Maria Villalba	
8/8/2018	(Spain) Elisabeth Amatriain (Spain) Patricia Llaguno	6–1 / 6–1	(Spain) Isabel Domínguez (Spain) Vanesa Alonso	
8/8/2018	(Spain) Ana Fernandez de Ossó (Spain) Maite Gabarrus Alonso	6–2 / 6–2	(France) Alix Collombon (Spain) Sara Pujals	
8/8/2018	(Spain) Meli García Truchado (Portugal) Sofia Araújo	6–1 / 7–5	(Spain) Andrea Medina (France) Laura Clergue	

=== Round of 16 ===
Men's

Date	Winners	Score	Opponent	Refs.
9/8/2018	(Argentina) Fernando Belasteguín (Brazil) Pablo Lima	6–7 / 6–1 / 6–1	(Spain) Gonzalo Rubio (Spain) Ernesto Moreno	
9/8/2018	(Argentina) Juan Cruz Belluati (Spain) Juan Lebrón	6–4 / 6–7 / 6–1	(Uruguay) Diego Ramos (Spain) Rafael Méndez	
9/8/2018	(Spain) Javi Ruiz (Spain) Uri Botello	7–6 / 6–2	(Argentina) Agustin Gomez Silingo (Spain) Alejandro Ruiz	
9/8/2018	(Spain) Juan Martin Díaz (Spain) Paquito Navarro	6–3 / 6–2	(Spain) José García Diestro (Spain) Martin Sanchez Piñeiro	
9/8/2018	(Spain) Alejandro Galán (Spain) Matías Díaz	6–4 / 7–5	(Spain) Álvaro Cepero (Argentina) Sebastián Nerone	
9/8/2018	(Spain) Juani Mieres (Argentina) Miguel Lamperti	6–3 / 6–3	(Spain) Jorge Ruiz (Spain) Miguel Solbes	
9/8/2018	(Argentina) Cristian Gutiérrez (Argentina) Franco Stupaczuk	6–1 / 2–1 / W.O.	(Argentina) Aris Patiniotis (Spain) Jordi Muñoz	
9/8/2018	(Argentina) Maxi Sánchez (Argentina) Sanyo Gutiérrez	7–5 / 6–4	(Spain) Aday Santana (Spain) Nacho Gadea	

Women's

Date	Winners	Score	Opponent	Refs.
9/8/2018	(Spain) Majo Sanchez (Spain) Mapi Sanchez	6–4 / 7–6	(Portugal) Ana Catarina Nogueira (Argentina) Delfina Brea	
9/8/2018	(Spain) Teresa Navarro (Spain) Victoria Iglesias	6–1 / 6–2	(Spain) Alicia Blanco Rojo (Spain) Beatriz Caldera	
9/8/2018	(Spain) Carolina Navarro (Argentina) Cecilia Reiter	6–1 / 6–0	(Spain) Elena Ramírez (Spain) Silvia López Vidal	
9/8/2018	(Spain) Alejandra Salazar (Spain) Marta Marrero	6–3 / 6–0	(Argentina) Aranzazu Osoro (Argentina) Nela Brito	
9/8/2018	(Spain) Ariana Sánchez (Spain) Marta Ortega	6–3 / 6–0	(Spain) Nuria Rovira (Spain) Raquel Segura Aguilar	
9/8/2018	(Spain) Beatriz González (Argentina) Catalina Tenorio	3–6 / 6–1 / 6–2	(Spain) Nuria Rovira (Spain) Raquel Segura Aguilar	
9/8/2018	(Spain) Elisabeth Amatriain (Spain) Patricia Llaguno	6–2 / 6–4	(Spain) Ana Fernandez de Ossó (Spain) Maite Gabarrus Alonso	
9/8/2018	(Spain) Gemma Triay (Spain) Lucía Sainz	6–3 / 6–2	(Spain) Meli García Truchado (Portugal) Sofia Araújo	

=== Quarter-Finals ===
Men's

Date	Winners	Score	Opponent	Refs.
10/8/2018	(Argentina) Juan Cruz Belluati (Spain) Juan Lebrón	W.O.	(Argentina) Fernando Belasteguín (Brazil) Pablo Lima	
10/8/2018	(Spain) Javi Ruiz (Spain) Uri Botello	7–5 / 6–4	(Spain) Juan Martin Díaz (Spain) Paquito Navarro	
10/8/2018	(Spain) Alejandro Galán (Spain) Matías Díaz	6–4 / 6–2	(Spain) Juani Mieres (Argentina) Miguel Lamperti	
10/8/2018	(Argentina) Maxi Sánchez (Argentina) Sanyo Gutiérrez	6–1 / 6–4	(Argentina) Cristian Gutiérrez (Argentina) Franco Stupaczuk	

Women's

Date	Winners	Score	Opponent	Refs.
10/8/2018	(Spain) Majo Sanchez (Spain) Mapi Sanchez	6–2 / 2–1 / W.O.	(Spain) Teresa Navarro (Spain) Victoria Iglesias	
10/8/2018	(Spain) Alejandra Salazar (Spain) Marta Marrero	6–0 / 6–4	(Spain) Carolina Navarro (Argentina) Cecilia Reiter	
10/8/2018	(Spain) Beatriz González (Argentina) Catalina Tenorio	3–6 / 7–6 / 6–2	(Spain) Ariana Sánchez (Spain) Marta Ortega	
10/8/2018	(Spain) Elisabeth Amatriain (Spain) Patricia Llaguno	7–5 / 6–4	(Spain) Gemma Triay (Spain) Lucía Sainz	

=== Semi-Finals ===
Men's

Date	Winners	Score	Opponent	Refs.
11/8/2018	(Argentina) Juan Cruz Belluati (Spain) Juan Lebrón	7–6 / 7–5	(Spain) Javi Ruiz (Spain) Uri Botello	
11/8/2018	(Argentina) Maxi Sánchez (Argentina) Sanyo Gutiérrez	6–4 / 7–6	(Spain) Alejandro Galán (Spain) Matías Díaz	

Women's

Date	Winners	Score	Opponent	Refs.
11/8/2018	(Spain) Majo Sanchez (Spain) Mapi Sanchez	7–6 / 6–3	(Spain) Alejandra Salazar (Spain) Marta Marrero	
11/8/2018	(Spain) Elisabeth Amatriain (Spain) Patricia Llaguno	6–2 / 6–7 / 6–0	(Spain) Beatriz González (Argentina) Catalina Tenorio	

=== Finals ===
Men's

Date	Winners	Score	Opponent	Refs.
12/8/2018	(Argentina) Maxi Sánchez (Argentina) Sanyo Gutiérrez	6–2 / 7–5	(Argentina) Juan Cruz Belluati (Spain) Juan Lebrón	

Women's

Date	Winners	Score	Opponent	Refs.
12/8/2018	(Spain) Majo Sanchez (Spain) Mapi Sanchez	6–1 / 6–3	(Spain) Elisabeth Amatriain (Spain) Patricia Llaguno	
