= Sanyo Gutiérrez =

Argentine padel player

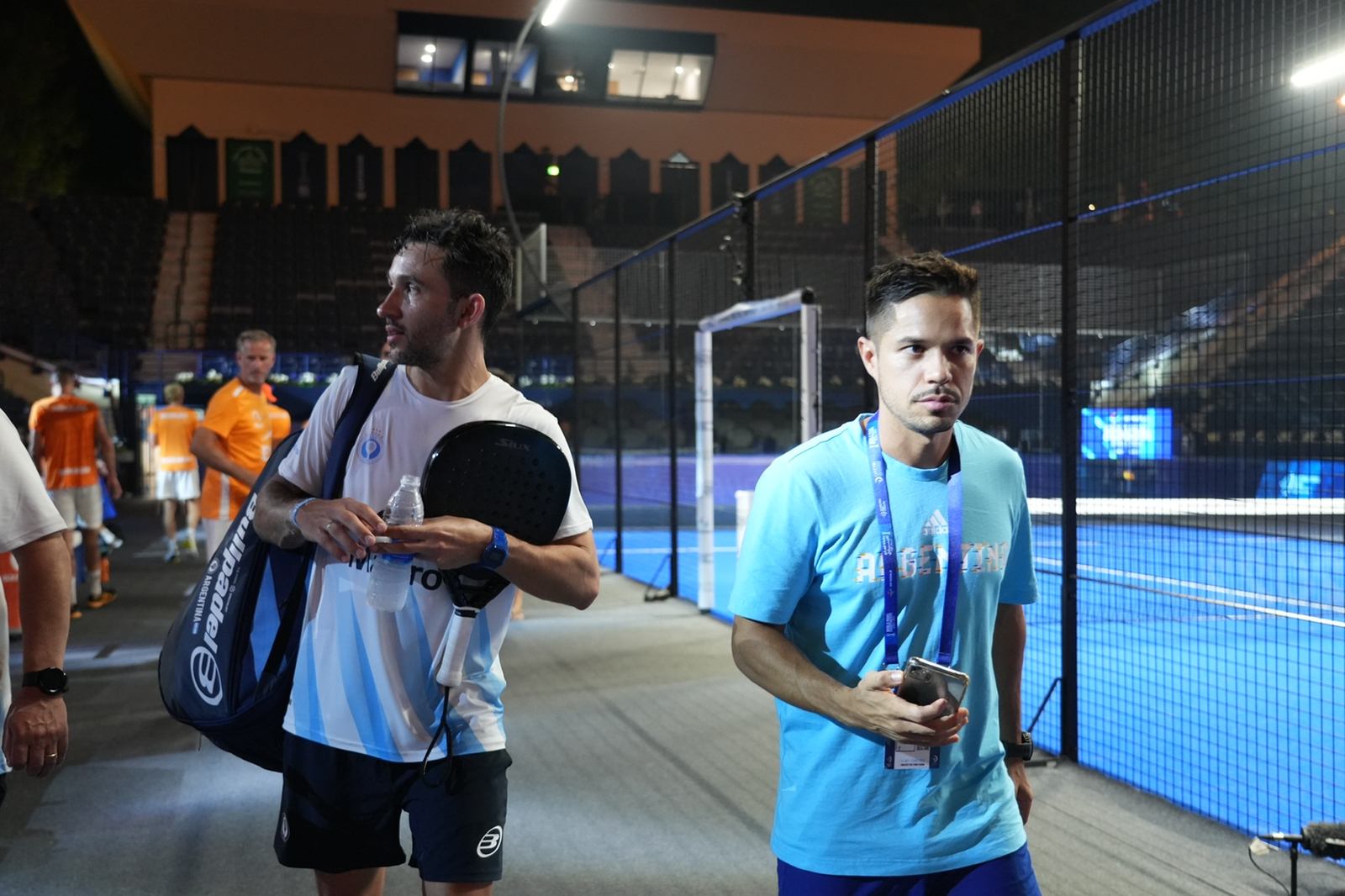

Personal information
- Full name: Carlos Daniel Gutiérrez Amaya
- Nicknames: Sanyo Gutiérrez; El Mago de San Luis; Abracadabra Gutiérrez
- Born: June 15, 1984 (age 42) Ciudad de San Luis, Argentina
- Resting place: Madrid, Spain
- Height: 175 cm (5 ft 9 in)
- Spouse: Valeria Pavón

Sport
- Country: Argentina
- Sport: Pádel
- Position: Drive (right-side)
- Rank: 23rd (PP)

Achievements and titles
- World finals: 2014, 2016, 2022, 2024
- Highest world ranking: 1st (2018)
- Updated on 21 August 2026

Carlos Daniel Gutiérrez Amaya (born 15 June 1984 in Pehuajó, San Luis, Argentina), better known as Sanyo Gutiérrez, is an Argentine professional padel player. He currently holds the 23rd position in the FIP rankings and plays on the right-side (drive) alongside Juanlu Esbri.

Throughout his career, Sanyo Gutiérrez has won over 40 titles, but the highest point of his career came in 2018 alongside Maxi Sánchez, when he reached the world number one spot in padel.

== Carrer ==
Sanyo Gutiérrez began playing padel at the age of 11 and entered the professional circuit at 15. In 2006, he decided to move to Spain to develop his career. From 2007 onwards, he regularly reached the quarterfinals of the Padel Pro Tour tournaments with various partners.

In 2009, Sanyo teamed up with Guillermo Lahoz, forming a partnership that helped him improve his game. He subsequently spent three years playing alongside former world number one Seba Nerone.

=== Partnership with Maxi Sanchéz ===
==== 2013 ====
In 2013, Sanyo partnered with his childhood friend Maxi Sánchez. The pair began the season with two semifinal losses, but at the season's third tournament in Cáceres, they reached the finals, where they lost to the "Kings of Padel," Fernando Belasteguín & Juan Martín Díaz.

In the next twelve tournaments, the Argentine pair would reach eight more semifinals but failed to advance to the next round in all of them. However, they bounced back by winning three of the season's final four tournaments: first, they defeated Maxi Grabiel & Miguel Lamperti in Valencia; next, they beat Cristián Gutiérrez & Matías Díaz in Buenos Aires; and finally, they finsihed the season in style by overcoming "The Kings of Padel" at the Master Final.

==== 2014 ====
With the good results of the previous season, Sanyo continued alongside Maxi Sánchez in 2014. In the first four tournaments, they managed only two quarter-final and two semi-final appearances, however, at the fifth tournament of the year in Málaga, the Argentine pair reached the finals, where they defeated the world's number two-ranked pair, Juani Mieres & Pablo Lima.

After three more tournaments in which they reached the semifinals only once, Maxi and Sanyo made it to two consecutive finals. in Seville and Lisbon, losing both to Belasteguín & J.M. Díaz.

After two more tournaments without reaching the final, Maxi and Sanyo made it to two more finals in San Fernando and Córdoba, losing both once again. However, the Argentine pair achieved glory in the season's final tournament, defeating Fernando Belasteguín & Juan Martín Díaz in the finals, with the latter playing their final match together.

==== 2015 ====
In 2015, Maxi and Sanyo began their third season together with a Round of 16 loss at the season's opening tournament, followed by two semifinal appearances. Their first final came at the Argentina Open, where they lost in three sets to the world number ones, Fernando Belasteguín & Pablo Lima.

After a first-round exit in Valladolid, Maxi and Sanyo decided to part ways; the former teamed up with Juan Martín Díaz, while the latter joined forces with Juani Mieres. In their first four tournaments together, Gutiérrez and Mieres reached the semifinals each time but failed to advance further, until Madrid, where they defeated Matías Díaz and Paquito Navarro to claim their first title as a pair.

They would reach three more finals in the following four tournaments, in Seville, Dubai, and Bilbao, facing and losing to Belasteguín & Lima in all of them.

The two would conclude the season with two quarter-final eliminations in the two final tournaments.

=== Partnership with Paquito Navarro ===
==== 2016 ====
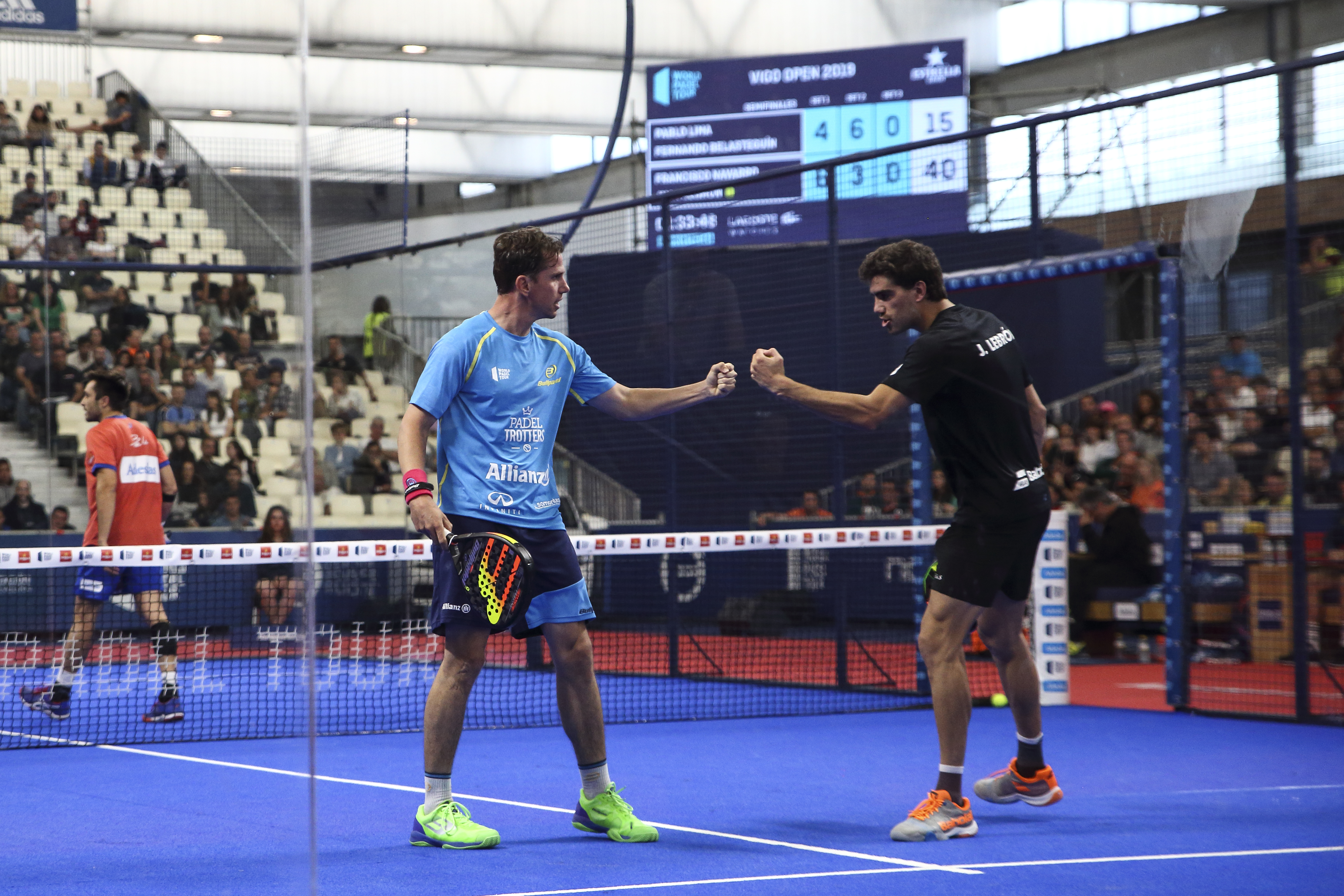
Paquito Navarro (left), who would team with Sanyo in 2016 and 2017, with Juan Lebrón (right), who would challenge him in 2019.

In the 2016 season, Sanyo decided to change partners and team up with Paquito Navarro, with the goal of challenging for the top ranking spot. They started their new adventure reaching the semifinals of the first tournament of the season.

In their second tournament, the Valencia Master, they bested the number 1 ranked pair, Fernando Belasteguín & Pablo Lima, in the semifinals, and in the final they defeated the Maxi Sánchez & Matías Díaz, thus winning their first tournament of the season. After a semi-final exit in the Barcelona Master, Paquito and Sanyo reached their second final of the season in the Las Rozas Open, but could not defeat the number one ranked pair.

In their next four tournaments the Spanish-Argentinian pair would reach three more finals, all of them against Belasteguín and Lima, losing the first two and achieving their second title of the season in the La Nucía Open, after the number 1 pair could not compete in the final, due to an injury of Fernando Belasteguín. In the seven last tournaments of the regular seasons they would reach five more finals, losing four of them to Belasteguín and Lima and ending the ranking race in second.

Paquito and Sanyo finsished the season winning the Masters Final, after defeating Juani Mieres & Miguel Lamperti in the finals, by 6–3 and 6–4.

Also in 2016, he competed in the Padel World Championship with the Argentine national team, winning the competition the after beating Spain 2–1 in the final. Sanyo Gutiérrez, playing with Fernando Belasteguín, would win his match against Paquito Navarro & Juan Martín Díaz, 6–4, 3–6, 7–5, tying the finals.

==== 2017 ====
In 2017, he continued his partnership with Paquito Navarro. They began the season winning the Santander Open and the Miami Master, beating the number one rankeds Fernando Belasteguín & Pablo Lima in both finals. Showing that Paquito and Sanyo Gutiérrez could pose a threat to the number 1s, in a final that would be repeated many times during the season.

Belasteguín & Lima would settle the score avenging their loss in rematches on the next two tournaments, winning the A Coruña Open and the Barcelona Master. In the fifth tournament of the season, the Valladolid Open, Sanyo and Paquito took the victory after the withdrawal before the final of the number 1 due to an injury of Fernando Belasteguín.

Neither team would reach the finals of the next two tournament, maintaining the ranking race close. They would meet again in the eighth tournament of the season, the Alicante Open, being defeated in the finals against Belasteguín & Lima in three sets. They would avenge their loss in the Seville Open, winning the title in Paquito's hometwon, and would repeat the result in Andorra, while in the meantime losing the Portugal Master to their rivals.

After a loss in the Granada Open, with three tournaments remaining, and both teams tied with ten finals contested and five titles each, the final tournaments would be crucial to the ranking race.

In the first of the remaining tournaments, held in Zaragoza, they did not reach the final, after losing in the semifinals. In the Buenos Aires Master, they reached another final, where they lost to Fernando Belasteguín & Pablo Lima, losing ground in the No. 1 Ranking race. At the Bilbao Open they lost in the semifinals against Maxi Sánchez and Matías Díaz ending their hopes of finishing the year as the number one pair. They finished the season with a quarter-finals exit in the Masters Final.

=== Return with Maxi Sanchéz ===
==== 2018 ====
In 2018, Sanyo parted ways with Paquito Navarro and returned to playing alongside Maxi Sánchez after a three-year hiatus, forming the "2.0" version of the pair with the goal of challenging Belasteguín & Lima. In their first tournament together, Catalunya Master, they claimed victory by defeating Juan Cruz Belluati & Juan Lebrón (who had eliminated the world number ones in the semifinals) with a score of 6–4, 6–2 in the final.

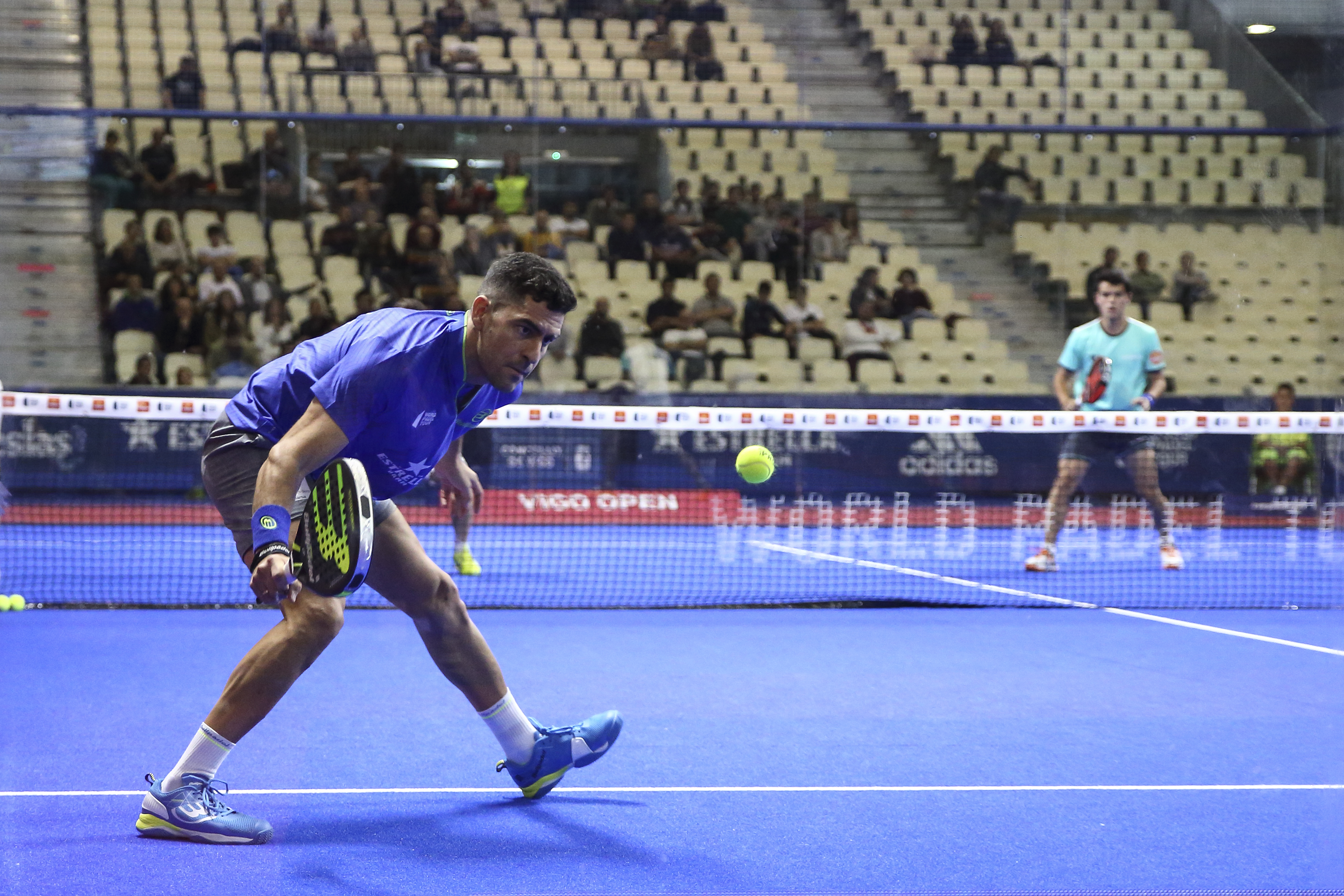
Maxi Sanchéz, who along with Sanyo finished 2018 as world number one.

After a quarterfinal exit in the following tournament, Maxi and Sanyo went on to win their second and third titles at the Zaragoza and Jaén Opens, defeating Juan Martín Díaz & Paquito Navarro in both finals.

Two final losses followed in the next two tournaments, the first against Alejandro Galán & Matías Díaz in Valladolid, and the second at the Valencia Master against Fernando Belasteguín & Lima. Despite these two defeats, the three tournament wins and two final appearances allowed the Argentine pair to close the gap on the top spot in the rankings.

After a quarter-final exit in Swedish, Maxi and Sanyo completed the first half of the season by winning the Mijas and Andorra Opens, moving even closer to the top of the rankings, and already aware that, due to Belasteguín's injury, there would be a new world number one for the first time in 16 years.

A quarter-final defeat at the season's tenth tournament was quickly forgotten with the capture of their sixth trophy of the year at the Portugal Master. This victory allowed Maxi Sánchez to take the lead in the rankings, dethroning Pablo Lima from the top spot on the World Padel Tour, with Sanyo trailing Maxi by just a few points.

In the season's final four tournaments, they only missed the finals once, losing in the final of the Granada Open, and triumphing in Argentina and Murcia Open.

At the Master Final, the season's last tournament, Maxi and Sanyo reached the finals, where they faced Belasteguín (who was returning from injury) & Lima. The Argentine-Brazilian duo prevailed, winning 7–6, 6–3. Nevertheless, Maxi and Sanyo finished the season as the World Padel Tour's number one pair, becoming the first partnership in 16 years to end Fernando Belasteguín's reign.

==== 2019 ====
Maxi and Sanyo began the top spot defense with two victories over the new Spanish pair of Juan Lebrón & Paquito Navarro (who would become their main rivals in 2019), defeating them in the Marbella and Logroño finals.

A Round of 16 exit in Alicante did not halt their momentum, as they faced Lebrón & Paquito again in the finals of the Vigo and Jaén Opens, winning the first and losing the second.

The weakest period of the year came during the second third of the season, where during the next five tournaments, not only did they fail to reach a single final, but they also suffered consecutive Round of 16 exits and managed to reach only one semifinal, in Buenos Aires.

Thanks to their results in previous tournaments, Lebrón & Paquito were closing the gap on Maxi and Sanyo in the race for the world number one ranking. Their first attempt to strike back came at the Madrid Master, where they reached the final but lost to Agustín Tapia and Belasteguín. A semifinal exit at the Portugal Master was followed by a victory at the Menorca Open. However, a quarterfinal elimination at the Córdoba Open, combined with Lebrón & Paquito reaching the final, left the Argentine pair on the verge of being surpassed in the next tournament.

Following that Round of 16 exit by Maxi and Sanyo, Lebrón & Paquito needed only to reach the semifinals of the São Paulo Open to surpass their rivals, which they did by winning the tournament. Despite defeating the two Spaniards in the subsequent tournament, it was not enough to reclaim the number one spot, and they ultimately finished the year as the world number two pair.

Their final tournament together was the Master Final, where they were eliminated in the semifinals by Alejandro Galán and Pablo Lima.

=== Partnership with Franco Stupaczuk ===
==== 2020 ====
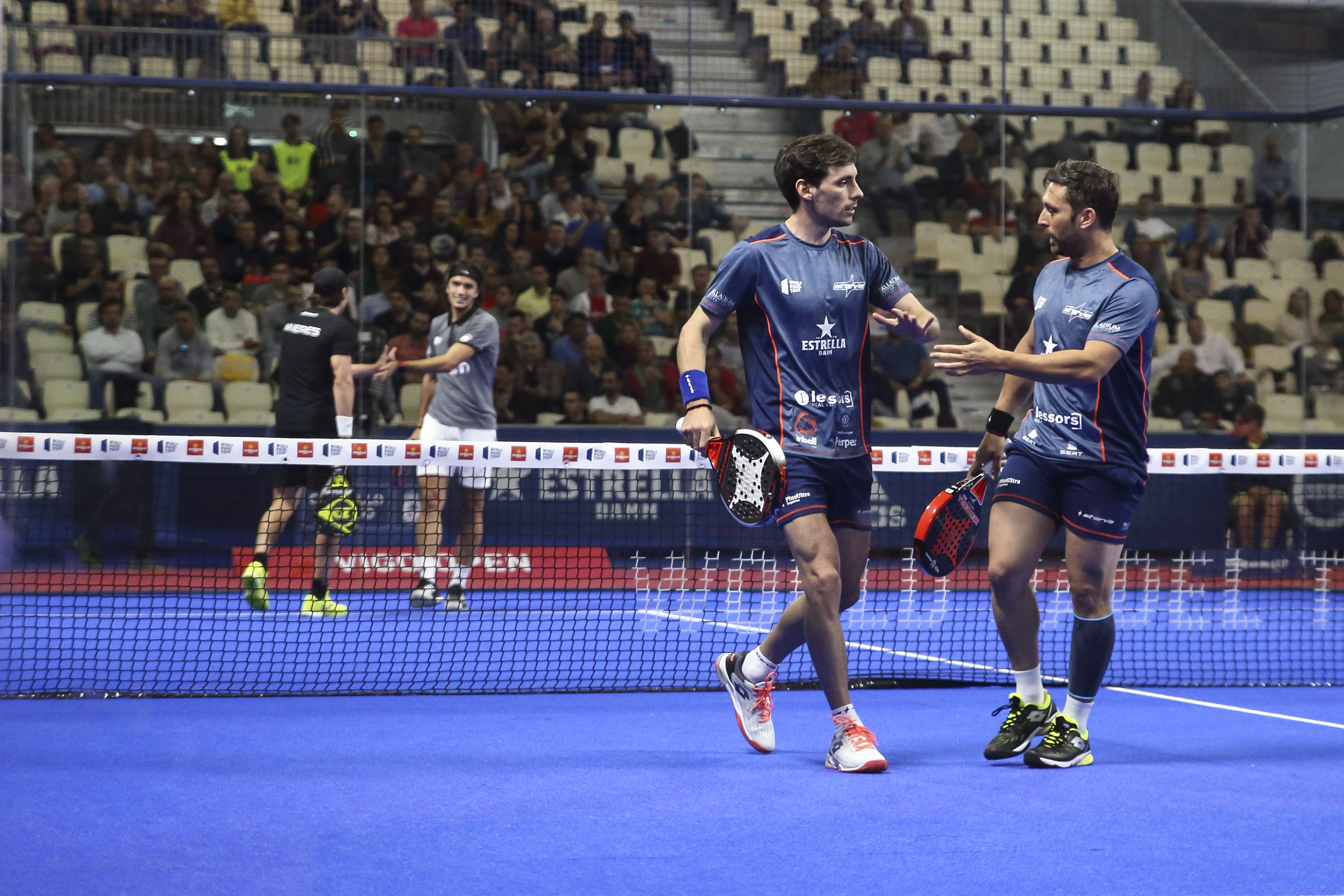
Franco Stupaczuk (left), who played with Sanyo in 2020.

After parting ways with Maxi Sánchez, Sanyo chose Franco Stupaczuk, one of the most promising young players on the circuit, as his next partner. They began their journey by reaching the semifinals of the Marbella Master, where they lost to Alejandro Galán & Juan Lebrón in a third-set tie-break.

In the first tournament following the COVID-19 hiatus, they once again reached the semifinals, only to be eliminated by Galán & Lebrón. This same outcome against the same opponents recurred in two of the next three tournaments, alongside a Round of 16 exit.

After a quarterfinal exit in Sardinia, Sanyo and Stupaczuk reached their first final in Menorca, where they defeated Agustín Tapia and Fernando Belasteguín to claim their first title together. In the subsequent tournaments in Barcelona and Alicante, they again reached the final but were defeated by Galán and Lebrón.

Following an early exit in Las Rozas, the two Argentines played their final tournament together at the Master Final, where they were eliminated by Belasteguín and Tapia in the semifinals.

The two Argentines finished the season as the third-ranked pair and tied for fifth place in the individual rankings.

=== Partnership Fernando Belasteguín ===
==== 2021 ====
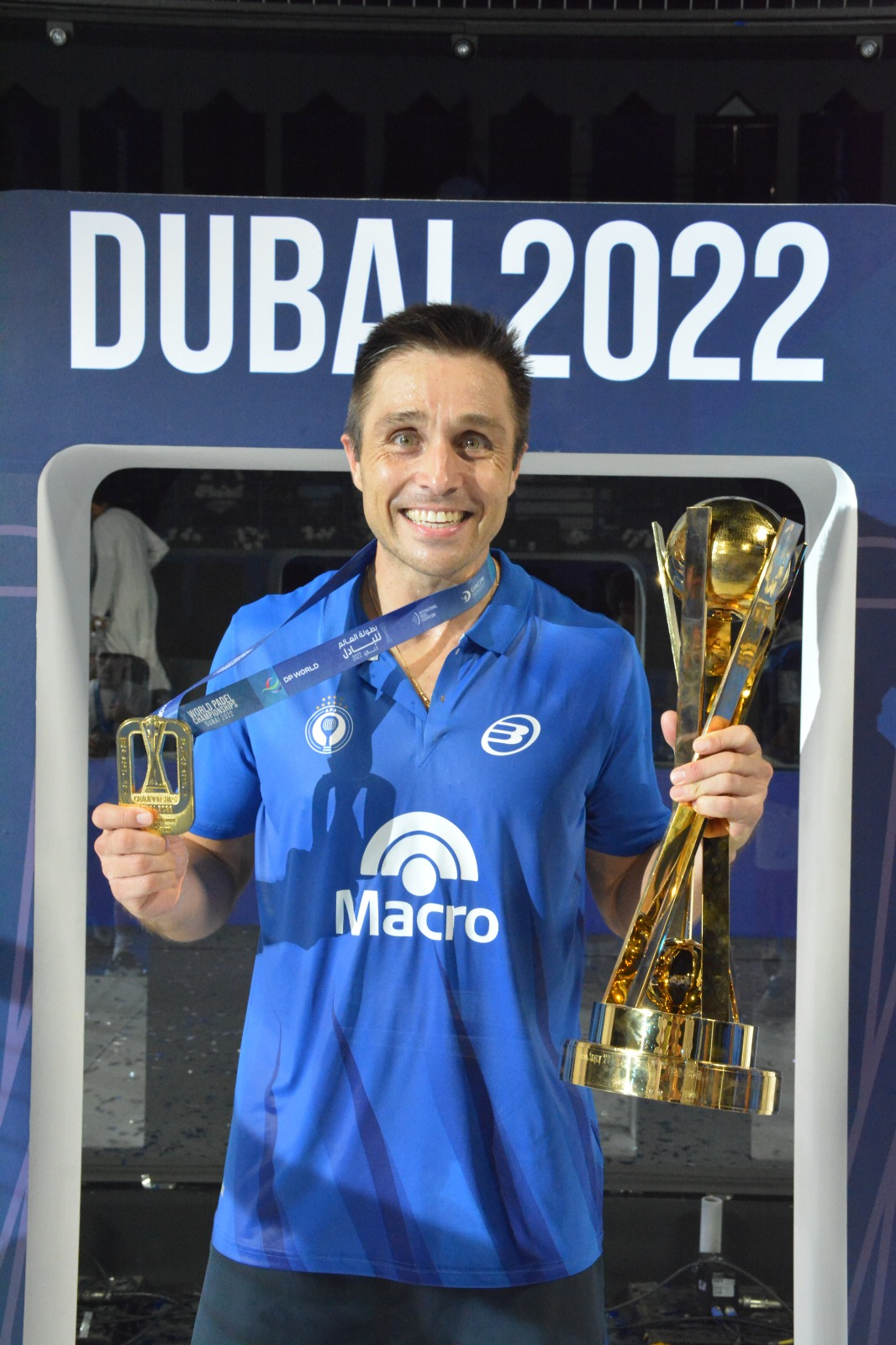
Fernando Belasteguín, who partnered Sanyo for most of the season.

A few days after the Master Final, Belasteguín announced Sanyo Gutiérrez as his new partner for the 2021 season. Having both failed to finish as world No. 1 in the two previous seasons, Bela and Sanyo had the goal of challenging Alejandro Galán & Juan Lebrón for the first Ranking spot. They made their debut in the Madrid Open, defeating Alex Ruiz and Franco Stupaczuk in a three-set final to win the tournament. In the next tournament, they were eliminated in a quarter-finals rematch against the same opponents, but returned in the Vigo Open, defeating Martín Di Nenno & Paquito Navarro in the final to win their second title of the season. During the Santander Open, Belasteguín suffered an injury that forced the pair to withdraw in the semi-finals, causing Sanyo to play the first Master of the season with his nephew Agustín Gutiérrez. They returned in the Valladolid Master, but were eliminated in the semi-finals, against eventual winners, Maxi Sánchez and Lucho Capra.

At the Valencia Open, the seventh tournament of the season, Belasteguín and Gutiérrez reached the finals, where they would face Galán & Lebrón, marking the first time in the season, that the top two seeds met in a final. Both teams entered the match with similar results, the Spanish duo had won three tournaments and the Argentinians two. After a very contested three-set match, Belasteguín and Gutiérrez won the tournament, reducing the distance between the two teams in the Ranking. They finished the first half of the season with a loss to Agustín Tapia & Lima in the finals of the Las Rozas Open, and a quarter-final loss in the Málaga Open.

After the summer break, Bela and Sanyo competed in the Portugal Master with the possibility of reaching the No. 1 race position, if they won the tournament, but were unexpectedly eliminated in the first round. The bad results continued with a round-of-16 elimination in the Sardegna Open and a quarter-final defeat in the Barcelona Master against Di Nenno & Paquito, who went on to win the tournament and surpass them in the Race standings. Following the loss, Belasteguín informed Gutiérrez of his decision to end their partnership, making the Lugo Open their last tournament together. They were eliminated in the quarter-finals, which allowed Di Nenno & Paquito to surpass them to second place in both Ranking and Race. Belasteguín and Sanyo concluded their partnership as the third ranked pair, and were ranked sixth and fifth individually, respectively.

=== Partnership with Agustín Tapia ===
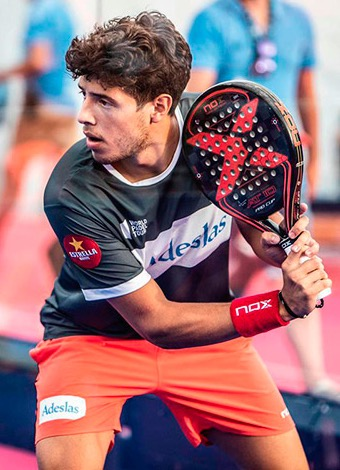
Agustín Tapia, who played with Sanyo in the final part of 2021 and in 2022.

A few days later it was confirmed that Agustín Tapia would be his new partner for the remainder of the season. Together they won a tournament before the end of the year, the Swedish Open, after defeating the number 2 seeds, Martín Di Nenno & Paquito Navarro, in the final by 7–5 and 6–0.

==== 2022 ====
In 2022, Sanyo continued playing alongside Tapia throughout the year. The pair began the season being eliminated in the Miami Open semifinals but bounced back to win the Reus Open, defeating Galán & Lebrón in the finals. However, the world number ones avenged the loss by eliminating them in the semifinals of the Vigo, Alicante, and Brussels Open's.

Next came a victory at the Danish Open, followed by a semifinal loss to the top-ranked pair in Marbella, a defeat they avenged in the Vienna Open final. At the French Open, they lost again in the semifinals to Galán and Lebrón, as well as in the Valladolid Master semifinals to Arturo Coello & Belasteguin. However, they headed into the summer break with wins in Valencia (against the world number ones) and Málaga, and a 3–5 record against their main rivals, allowing them to rise to the number two spot and significantly close the gap on the top-ranked pair in the rankings.

Nevertheless, they were unable to maintain their level of play during the final months of the competition, advancing past the quarterfinals in only two of the last nine World Padel Tour tournaments of the year. Even so, they finished as the number two ranked pair, with over 10,000 points each, and officially announced their split following the Barcelona Master Final.

In 2022, Sanyo also made his debut on the new Premier Padel circuit. His best performance came at the Mexico Major, where he reached the final alongside Tapia but lost in three sets to Belasteguín & Coello.

=== Different partners and current phase ===
==== 2023 ====
Sanyo began the 2023 season alongside his former partner, Fernando Belasteguín. Together, they reached the final of the Qatar Major, the season's opening tournament organized by Premier Padel, but the pair split up following poor results in subsequent tournaments.

The Argentine then teamed up with Momo González, and after reaching two consecutive semifinals, they made it to the final of the season's eighth tournament, the Danish Open, where they lost to Franco Stupaczuk & Martín Di Nenno. The duo reached another final at the Marbella Master, where they were defeated by Coello & Tapia.

For the remainder of the season, the pair experienced mixed results, reaching a few semifinals but failing to make it to another final.

=== Premier Padel Era ===
Since 2024, Sanyo has had several partners, including a second stint with Paquito and a third with Maxi Sánchez, but has failed to reach a Premier Padel final due to the dominance of Coello & Tapia and Galán & Chingotto.

== Honours ==
=== Padel Pro Tour (2006–2012) ===
Winner Runner-up

==== Finals ====
N.º	Date	Tournament	Partner	Result	Opponents in the final	Career title No.
2010
1.	22/2/2010	(Argentina) Mendoza International	(Argentina) Miguel Lamperti	3–6 / 4–6	(Argentina) Agustín Gomez Silingo (Argentina) Maxi Grabiel	
2.	7/3/2010	(Argentina) San Luis International	(Argentina) Cristián Gutiérrez	0–6 / 6–3 / 7–5	(Spain) Juan Martín Díaz (Argentina) Roby Gattiker	1st
2011
3.	7/8/2011	(Spain) Fuengirola International	(Argentina) Sebastián Nerone	7–6 / 2–6 / 5–7	(Argentina) Hernán Auguste (Spain) Matías Díaz	
4.	4/9/2011	(Spain) Palma de Mallorca International	(Argentina) Sebastián Nerone	6–4 / 7–6	(Argentina) Hernán Auguste (Spain) Matías Díaz	2nd
2012
5.	15/7/2012	(Spain) Alicante International	(Argentina) Sebastián Nerone	7–6 / 6–4	(Spain) Juani Mieres (Brazil) Pablo Lima	3rd
6.	19/8/2012	(Spain) Gijón International	(Argentina) Sebastián Nerone	4–6 / 7–6 / 6–3	(Argentina) Fernando Belasteguín (Spain) Juan Martín Díaz	4th
7.	18/11/2012	(Spain) Euskadi International	(Argentina) Sebastián Nerone	6–3 / 6–3	(Argentina) Hernán Auguste (Brazil) Pablo Lima	5th
8.	2/12/2012	(Spain) Logroño International	(Argentina) Sebastián Nerone	6–3 / 6–4	(Argentina) Hernán Auguste (Brazil) Pablo Lima	6th
9.	16/12/2012	(Spain) PPT Master Final	(Argentina) Sebastián Nerone	4–6 / 4–6	(Spain) Juan Mieres (Brazil) Pablo Lima	

Tournaments won	International	Master Final	Total
Tournaments won	6	0	6

=== World Padel Tour (2013–2023) ===
Winner Runner-up

==== Finals ====
N.º	Date	Tournament	Partner	Result	Opponents in the final	Career title No.
2013
10.	26/5/2013	(Spain) Cáceres Open	(Argentina) Maxi Sánchez	3–6 / 2–6 / 2–6	(Argentina) Fernando Belasteguín (Spain) Juan Martín Díaz	
11.	10/11/2013	(Spain) Valencia Open	(Argentina) Maxi Sánchez	6–3 / 7–5 / 6–4	(Argentina) Maxi Grabiel (Argentina) Miguel Lamperti	7th
12.	24/11/2013	(Argentina) Buenos Aires Open	(Argentina) Maxi Sánchez	4–6 / 7–6 / 6–2 / 6–3	(Argentina) Cristian Gutiérrez (Spain) Matías Díaz	8th
13.	22/12/2013	(Spain) Master Final	(Argentina) Maxi Sánchez	6–7 / 6–1 / 7–6 / W.O.	(Argentina) Fernando Belasteguín (Spain) Juan Martín Díaz	9th
2014
14.	27/7/2014	(Spain) Málaga Open	(Argentina) Maxi Sánchez	4–6 / 6–4 / 6–2 / 6–4	(Spain) Juani Mieres (Brazil) Pablo Lima	10th
15.	21/9/2014	(Spain) Sevilla Open	(Argentina) Maxi Sánchez	3–6 / 3–6 / 1–6	(Argentina) Fernando Belasteguín (Spain) Juan Martín Díaz	
16.	5/10/2014	Portugal Open	(Argentina) Maxi Sánchez	4–6 / 4–6 / 1–6	(Argentina) Fernando Belasteguín (Spain) Juan Martín Díaz	
17.	22/11/2014	(Argentina) San Fernando Open	(Argentina) Maxi Sánchez	5–7 / 7–5 / 5–7 / 6–7	(Argentina) Maximiliano Grabiel (Spain) Paquito Navarro	
18.	30/11/2014	Argentina Open	(Argentina) Maxi Sánchez	1–6 / 7–5 / 3–6	(Argentina) Fernando Belasteguín (Spain) Juan Martín Díaz	
19.	21/12/2014	(Spain) Master Final	(Argentina) Maxi Sánchez	7–6 / 5–7 / 7–5	(Argentina) Fernando Belasteguín (Spain) Juan Martín Díaz	11th
2015
20.	7/6/2015	Argentina Open	(Argentina) Maxi Sánchez	7–5 / 2–6 / 2–6	(Argentina) Fernando Belasteguín (Brazil) Pablo Lima	
21.	20/9/2015	(Spain) Madrid Open	(Spain) Juani Mieres	6–3 / 7–6	(Spain) Matías Díaz (Spain) Paquito Navarro	12th
22.	4/10/2015	(Spain) Seville Open	(Spain) Juani Mieres	2–6 / 0–6	(Argentina) Fernando Belasteguín (Brazil) Pablo Lima	
23.	31/10/2015	(United Arab Emirates) Dubai Master	(Spain) Juani Mieres	1–6 / 2–6	(Argentina) Fernando Belasteguín (Brazil) Pablo Lima	
24.	8/11/2015	(Spain) Euskadi Open	(Spain) Juani Mieres	5–7 / 4–6	(Argentina) Fernando Belasteguín (Brazil) Pablo Lima	
2016
25.	24/4/2016	(Spain) Valencia Master	(Spain) Paquito Navarro	7–6 / 7–6	(Spain) Matías Díaz (Argentina) Maxi Sánchez	13th
26.	29/5/2016	(Spain) Las Rozas Open	(Spain) Paquito Navarro	1–6 / 2–6	(Argentina) Fernando Belasteguín (Brazil) Pablo Lima	
27.	10/7/2016	(Spain) Valladolid Open	(Spain) Paquito Navarro	6–7 / 5–7	(Argentina) Fernando Belasteguín (Brazil) Pablo Lima	
28.	31/7/2016	(Spain) Las Palmas Open	(Spain) Paquito Navarro	0–6 / 4–6	(Argentina) Fernando Belasteguín (Brazil) Pablo Lima	
29.	28/8/2016	(Spain) La Nucia Open	(Spain) Paquito Navarro	W.O.	(Argentina) Fernando Belasteguín (Brazil) Pablo Lima	14th
30.	25/9/2016	(Spain) Seville Open	(Spain) Paquito Navarro	4–6 / 2–6	(Argentina) Fernando Belasteguín (Brazil) Pablo Lima	
31.	16/10/2016	(Spain) A Coruña Open	(Spain) Paquito Navarro	7–6 / 4–6 / 3–6	(Argentina) Fernando Belasteguín (Brazil) Pablo Lima	
32.	6/11/2016	(Argentina) Mendoza Open	(Spain) Paquito Navarro	4–6 / 5–7	(Spain) Matías Díaz (Argentina) Maxi Sánchez	
33.	13/11/2016	Argentina Master	(Spain) Paquito Navarro	3–6 / 7–6 / 3–6	(Argentina) Fernando Belasteguín (Brazil) Pablo Lima	
34.	4/12/2016	(Spain) Euskadi Open	(Spain) Paquito Navarro	2–6 / 4–6	(Argentina) Fernando Belasteguín (Brazil) Pablo Lima	
35.	18/12/2016	(Spain) Master Final	(Spain) Paquito Navarro	6–3 / 6–4	(Spain) Juani Mieres (Argentina) Miguel Lamperti	15th
2017
36.	2/4/2017	(Spain) Santander Open	(Spain) Paquito Navarro	4–6 / 6–4 / 7–6	(Argentina) Fernando Belasteguín (Brazil) Pablo Lima	16th
37.	30/4/2017	(United States) Miami Master	(Spain) Paquito Navarro	7–6 / 6–3	(Argentina) Fernando Belasteguín (Brazil) Pablo Lima	17th
38.	14/5/2017	(Spain) A Coruña Open	(Spain) Paquito Navarro	5–7 / 3–6	(Argentina) Fernando Belasteguín (Brazil) Pablo Lima	
39.	4/6/2017	(Spain) Barcelona Master	(Spain) Paquito Navarro	3–6 / 1–6	(Argentina) Fernando Belasteguín (Brazil) Pablo Lima	
40.	25/6/2017	(Spain) Valladolid Open	(Spain) Paquito Navarro	W.O.	(Argentina) Fernando Belasteguín (Brazil) Pablo Lima	18th
41.	27/8/2017	(Spain) Alicante Open	(Spain) Paquito Navarro	3–6 / 6–3 / 3–6	(Argentina) Fernando Belasteguín (Brazil) Pablo Lima	
42.	10/9/2017	(Spain) Seville Open	(Spain) Paquito Navarro	6–4 / 6–2	(Argentina) Fernando Belasteguín (Brazil) Pablo Lima	19th
43.	24/9/2017	Portugal Master	(Spain) Paquito Navarro	2–6 / 6–1 / 1–6	(Argentina) Fernando Belasteguín (Brazil) Pablo Lima	
44.	1/10/2017	Andorra Open	(Spain) Paquito Navarro	3–6 / 6–4 / 6–4	(Argentina) Fernando Belasteguín (Brazil) Pablo Lima	20th
45.	15/10/2017	(Spain) Granada Open	(Spain) Paquito Navarro	6–7 / 1–6	(Argentina) Fernando Belasteguín (Brazil) Pablo Lima	
46.	12/11/2017	Argentina Master	(Spain) Paquito Navarro	1–6 / 6–7	(Argentina) Fernando Belasteguín (Brazil) Pablo Lima	
2018
47.	25/3/2018	(Spain) Catalunya Master	(Argentina) Maxi Sánchez	6–4 / 6–2	(Argentina) Juan Cruz Belluati (Spain) Juan Lebrón	21st
48.	6/5/2018	(Spain) Zaragoza Open	(Argentina) Maxi Sánchez	6–4 / 6–7 / 6–3	(Spain) Juan Martín Díaz (Spain) Paquito Navarro	22nd
49.	27/5/2018	(Spain) Jaén Open	(Argentina) Maxi Sánchez	6–3 / 6–3	(Spain) Juan Martín Díaz (Spain) Paquito Navarro	23rd
50.	24/6/2018	(Spain) Valladolid Open	(Argentina) Maxi Sánchez	5–7 / 6–3 / 3–6	(Spain) Alejandro Galán (Spain) Matías Díaz	
51.	8/7/2018	(Spain) Valencia Master	(Argentina) Maxi Sánchez	0–6 / 2–6	(Argentina) Fernando Belasteguín (Brazil) Pablo Lima	
52.	12/8/2018	(Spain) Mijas Open	(Argentina) Maxi Sánchez	6–2 / 7–5	(Argentina) Juan Cruz Belluati (Spain) Juan Lebrón	24th
53.	26/8/2018	Andorra Open	(Argentina) Maxi Sánchez	5–7 / 6–4 / 6–4	(Argentina) Cristian Gutiérrez (Argentina) Franco Stupaczuk	25th
54.	23/9/2018	Portugal Master	(Argentina) Maxi Sánchez	7–6 / 7–5	(Spain) Juani Mieres (Argentina) Miguel Lamperti	26th
55.	14/10/2018	(Spain) Granada Open	(Argentina) Maxi Sánchez	6–2 / 6–7 / 2–6	(Argentina) Cristian Gutiérrez (Argentina) Franco Stupaczuk	
56.	11/11/2018	Argentina Master	(Argentina) Maxi Sánchez	6–7 / 6–4 / 6–2	(Argentina) Adrián Allemandi (Argentina) Agustín Gómez Silingo	27th
57.	25/11/2018	(Spain) Murcia Open	(Argentina) Maxi Sánchez	2–6 / 7–5 / 6–3	(Brazil) Pablo Lima (Spain) Paquito Navarro	28th
58.	16/12/2018	(Spain) Master Final	(Argentina) Maxi Sánchez	6–7 / 3–6	(Argentina) Fernando Belasteguín (Brazil) Pablo Lima	
2019
59.	24/3/2019	(Spain) Marbella Master	(Argentina) Maxi Sánchez	6–1 / 7–6	(Spain) Juan Lebrón (Spain) Paquito Navarro	29th
60.	14/4/2019	(Spain) Logroño Open	(Argentina) Maxi Sánchez	7–6 / 7–6	(Spain) Juan Lebrón (Spain) Paquito Navarro	30th
61.	12/5/2019	(Spain) Vigo Open	(Argentina) Maxi Sánchez	6–3 / 6–4	(Spain) Juan Lebrón (Spain) Paquito Navarro	31st
62.	26/5/2019	(Spain) Jaén Open	(Argentina) Maxi Sánchez	5–7 / 4–6	(Spain) Juan Lebrón (Spain) Paquito Navarro	
63.	8/9/2019	(Spain) Madrid Master	(Argentina) Maxi Sánchez	4–6 / 4–6	(Argentina) Agustín Tapia (Argentina) Fernando Belasteguín	
64.	13/10/2019	(Spain) Menorca Open	(Argentina) Maxi Sánchez	6–4 / 6–3	(Spain) Javi Ruiz (Spain) Uri Botello	32nd
65.	1/12/2019	Mexico Open	(Argentina) Maxi Sánchez	7–6 / 6–2	(Spain) Juan Lebrón (Spain) Paquito Navarro	33rd
2020
66.	27/9/2020	(Spain) Menorca Open	(Argentina) Franco Stupaczuk	6–3 / 7–5	(Argentina) Agustín Tapia (Argentina) Fernando Belasteguín	34th
67.	18/10/2020	(Spain) Barcelona Master	(Argentina) Franco Stupaczuk	4–6 / 1–6	(Spain) Alejandro Galán (Spain) Juan Lebrón	
68.	8/11/2020	(Spain) Alicante Open	(Argentina) Franco Stupaczuk	6–4 / 3–6 / 4–6	(Spain) Alejandro Galán (Spain) Juan Lebrón	
2021
69.	11/4/2021	(Spain) Madrid Open	(Argentina) Fernando Belasteguín	6–7 / 6–4 / 6–3	(Spain) Alejandro Ruiz (Argentina) Franco Stupaczuk	35th
70.	16/5/2021	(Spain) Vigo Open	(Argentina) Fernando Belasteguín	4–6 / 6–4 / 6–2	(Argentina) Martín Di Nenno (Spain) Paquito Navarro	36th
71.	11/7/2021	(Spain) Valencia Open	(Argentina) Fernando Belasteguín	7–5 / 3–6 / 6–4	(Spain) Alejandro Galán (Spain) Juan Lebrón	37th
72.	11/7/2021	(Spain) Las Rozas Open	(Argentina) Fernando Belasteguín	1–6 / 4–6	(Argentina) Agustín Tapia (Brazil) Pablo Lima	
73.	14/11/2021	(Sweden) Swedish Open	(Argentina) Agustín Tapia	7–5 / 6–0	(Argentina) Martín Di Nenno (Spain) Paquito Navarro	38th
74.	28/11/2021	Argentina Master	(Argentina) Agustín Tapia	4–6 / 2–6	(Argentina) Martín Di Nenno (Spain) Paquito Navarro	
75.	19/12/2021	(Spain) Master Final	(Argentina) Agustín Tapia	4–6 / 4–6	(Spain) Alejandro Galán (Spain) Juan Lebrón	
2022
76.	13/3/2022	(Spain) Reus Open	(Argentina) Agustín Tapia	6–2 / 6–2	(Spain) Alejandro Galán (Spain) Juan Lebrón	39th
77.	22/5/2022	(Denmark) Danish Open	(Argentina) Agustín Tapia	5–7 / 7–5 / 6–0	(Argentina) Lucho Capra (Argentina) Maxi Sánchez	40th
78.	12/6/2022	Austria Open	(Argentina) Agustín Tapia	6–1 / 0–6 / 7–6	(Spain) Alejandro Galán (Spain) Juan Lebrón	41st
79.	10/7/2022	(Spain) Valencia Open	(Argentina) Agustín Tapia	2–6 / 7–5 / 6–4	(Spain) Alejandro Galán (Spain) Juan Lebrón	42nd
80.	24/7/2022	(Spain) Málaga Open	(Argentina) Agustín Tapia	7–6 / 6–4	(Argentina) Franco Stupaczuk (Brazil) Pablo Lima	43rd
81.	11/9/2022	Portugal Open	(Argentina) Agustín Tapia	2–6 / 7–6 / 1–6	(Spain) Alejandro Galán (Spain) Juan Lebrón	
82.	13/11/2022	(Sweden) Malmö Open	(Argentina) Agustín Tapia	6–4 / 1–6 / 2–6	(Spain) Alejandro Galán (Spain) Juan Lebrón	
2023
83.	21/5/2023	(Denmark) Danish Open 1000	(Spain) Momo González	3–6 / 2–6	(Argentina) Franco Stupaczuk (Argentina) Martín Di Nenno	
84.	4/6/2023	(Spain) Marbella	(Spain) Momo González	3–6 / 2–6	(Argentina) Agustín Tapia (Spain) Arturo Coello	

Tournaments won	Challenger	Open	Master	Master Final	Total
Tournaments won	0	28	6	3	37

=== Premier Padel ===
Winner Runner-up

==== Finals ====
N.º	Date	Tournament	Partner	Result	Opponents in the final	Career title No.
2022
85.	4/12/2022	Mexico Major	(Argentina) Agustín Tapia	3–6 / 6–3 / 3–6	(Spain) Arturo Coello (Argentina) Fernando Belasteguín	
2023
86.	5/3/2023	Qatar Major	(Argentina) Fernando Belasteguín	2–6 / 6–7	(Argentina) Franco Stupaczuk (Argentina) Martín Di Nenno	

Tournaments won	P2	P1	Major	PP Final	Total
Tournaments won	0	0	0	0	0

=== Padel World Championship ===
N.º	Year	Opponent	Result
1	2014	Argentina	2–1
2	2016	Argentina	2–1
3	2022	Argentina	2–1
4	2024	Argentina	2–1
