= 2018 WPT Granada Open =

World Padel Tour tournament held in Granada, Spain

- Date: 8 – 14 October
- Edition: 5th (Note: The first two editions were held under the organization of the Padel Pro Tour.)
- Category: Open
- Location: Granada, Spain
- Venue: Palacio Municipal de Deportes de Granada

Champions
- Men's doubles: (Argentina) Cristián Gutiérrez (Argentina) Franco Stupaczuk
- Women's doubles: (Spain) Gemma Triay (Spain) Lucía Sainz

Chronology

The 2018 Granada Open (officially 2018 World Padel Tour Granada Open) was the thirteenth tournament of the sixth season organized by World Padel Tour, the most prestigious padel circuit at the time.

In the women’s category, for the second time in twelve tournaments, twins Majo and Mapi Sánchez failed to reach the final, after they were eliminated by the fourth-ranked pair, Ariana Sánchez and Marta Ortega, who ended the world number one's streak of ten consecutive final appearances. In the final, the second-ranked pair, Gemma Triay and Lucia Sainz, defeated Ariana and Marta in straight sets, securing their fourth title of the season and successfully defending the title they won the previous year, marking the second time both players have triumphed in Granada.

In the men’s category, Cristian Gutiérrez and Franco Stupaczuk reached their third final of the season, where they would face the world number ones, Maxi Sánchez and Sanyo Gutiérrez. In the battle for the title, Gutiérrez and Stupaczuk defeated Maxi and Sanyo in three sets, avenging their loss in the Andorra final, to secure their first title of the season, and the first for both of them in Granada.

Due to various injuries sustained at the previous tournament in Lisbon, where he collided with a glass court panel that shattered, Paquito Navarro was unable to compete in the Granada Open. This gave Alejandro Galán the chance to become the highest-ranked Spaniard, should he win the tournament. In addition to Navarro, Fernando Belasteguín and Pablo Lima also did not participate in the event.

== Head-to-head record between teams ranked in the top 4 during the season ==
=== Men's ===
| Record | Maxi–Sanyo | Galán–M. Díaz | Lima–Silingo | J.M. Díaz–Paquito | Former Pairs | Gutiérrez–Stupaczuk | Belasteguín–Lima | Lima–M. Jardim |
| Maxi–Sanyo | — | 2–3 | — | 4–0 | | 3–2 | 0–1 | — |
| Galán–M. Díaz | 3–2 | — | — | 1–2 | | 2–2 | 0–1 | — |
| Lima–Silingo | — | — | — | — | | — | — | — |
| J.M. Díaz–Paquito | 0–4 | 2–1 | — | — | | — | 0–2 | — |
| Former Pairs | | | | | | | | |
| Gutiérrez–Stupaczuk | 2–3 | 2–2 | — | — | | — | 0–1 | 1–0 |
| Belasteguín–Lima | 1–0 | 1–0 | — | 2–0 | | 1–0 | — | — |
| Lima–M. Jardim | — | — | — | — | | 0–1 | — | — |

=== Women's ===
| Record | Majo–Mapi | Marrero–Salazar | Triay–Sainz | Ariana–Ortega | Former Pairs | Amatriain–Llaguno |
| Majo–Mapi | — | 3–3 | 3–3 | 3–1 | | 6–0 |
| Marrero–Salazar | 3–3 | — | 3–5 | 2–0 | | 1–0 |
| Triay–Sainz | 3–3 | 5–3 | — | 2–0 | | 2–1 |
| Ariana–Ortega | 1–3 | 0–2 | 0–2 | — | | 2–1 |
| Former Pairs | | | | | | |
| Amatriain–Llaguno | 0–6 | 0–1 | 1–2 | 1–2 | | — |

== Draws ==
=== Men's Bracket ===
Round of 32
1 | (Argentina) Maxi / (Argentina) Sanyo
Bye
Q | (Spain) C. Fuster / (Spain) R. Marcos | 6 | 7
(Argentina) F. Quiles / (Argentina) M. Grabiel | 4 | 5
(Argentina) J.C. Belluati / (Spain) P. Lijó | 6 | 6
(Argentina) M. Nicoletti / (Spain) P.A. Martínez | 4 | 3
(Spain) G. Rubio / (Spain) E. Moreno | 4 | 1
(Brazil) L. Bergamini / (Brazil) L. Campagnolo | 6 | 6
(Spain) J. Ruiz / (Spain) U. Botello | 6 | 3 | 6
(Spain) J.G. Diestro / (Spain) M. Piñeiro | 4 | 6 | 2
(Spain) Á. Cepero / (Argentina) S. Nerone | 0 | 6 | 4
(Spain) A. Luque / (Spain) B. Yribarren | 6 | 3 | 6
(Brazil) F. Gomes / (Argentina) J. Restivo | 3 | 2
(Argentina) G. Tamame / (Spain) N. Gadea | 6 | 6
Bye
4 | (Spain) J. Mieres / (Argentina) M. Lamperti
3 | (Argentina) C. Gutiérrez / (Argentina) Stupaczuk
Bye
(Spain) J. Muñoz / (Spain) W. Lahoz | 3 | 4
(Spain) J. Rico / (Spain) V. Ruiz
Q | (Argentina) F. Chingotto / (Argentina) J. Tello | 6 | 6
(Argentina) A. Silingo / (Brazil) M. Jardim | 4 | 3
(Spain) A. Blanco / (Spain) J. Vazquez | 4 | 2
(Argentina) L. Capra / (Argentina) R. Moyano | 6 | 6
(Spain) J.M. Díaz / (Spain) Lebrón | 6 | 6
(Uruguay) D. Ramos / (Spain) R. Méndez | 4 | 1
(Argentina) A. Allemandi / (Argentina) F. Poggi | 3 | 7 | 2
(Spain) Coki / (Spain) J. Rico | 6 | 6 | 6
(Spain) A. Santana / (Argentina) Godo Díaz | 3 | 6 | 6
(Spain) A. Ruiz / (Spain) J. Garrido | 6 | 4 | 3
Bye
2 | (Spain) Galán / (Spain) M. Díaz

Round of 16
1 | (Argentina) Maxi / (Argentina) Sanyo | 7 | 3 | 6
Q | (Spain) C. Fuster / (Spain) R. Marcos | 6 | 6 | 1
(Argentina) J.C. Belluati / (Spain) P. Lijó | 6 | 7
(Brazil) L. Bergamini / (Brazil) L. Campagnolo | 3 | 6
(Spain) J. Ruiz / (Spain) U. Botello | 2 | 7 | 6
(Spain) A. Luque / (Spain) B. Yribarren | 6 | 6 | 3
(Argentina) G. Tamame / (Spain) N. Gadea | 4 | 6
4 | (Spain) J. Mieres / (Argentina) M. Lamperti | 6 | 7
3 | (Argentina) C. Gutiérrez / (Argentina) Stupaczuk | 6 | 6 | 7
(Spain) J. Rico / (Spain) V. Ruiz | 7 | 3 | 5
Q | (Argentina) F. Chingotto / (Argentina) J. Tello | 3 | 2
(Argentina) L. Capra / (Argentina) R. Moyano | 6 | 6
(Spain) J.M. Díaz / (Spain) Lebrón | 5 | 6 | 6
(Spain) Coki / (Spain) J. Rico | 7 | 0 | 1
(Spain) A. Santana / (Argentina) Godo Díaz | 3 | 6 | 6
2 | (Spain) Galán / (Spain) M. Díaz | 6 | 0 | 3

Quarter-Final
1 | (Argentina) Maxi / (Argentina) Sanyo | 6 | 6
(Argentina) J.C. Belluati / (Spain) P. Lijó | 3 | 4
(Spain) J. Ruiz / (Spain) U. Botello | 3 | 7 | 3
4 | (Spain) J. Mieres / (Argentina) M. Lamperti | 6 | 6 | 6
3 | (Argentina) C. Gutiérrez / (Argentina) Stupaczuk | 7 | 6
(Argentina) L. Capra / (Argentina) R. Moyano | 6 | 2
(Spain) J.M. Díaz / (Spain) Lebrón | 6 | 3 | 7
2 | (Spain) Galán / (Spain) M. Díaz | 4 | 6 | 6

Semi-Finals
1 | (Argentina) Maxi / (Argentina) Sanyo | 6 | 6
4 | (Spain) J. Mieres / (Argentina) M. Lamperti | 1 | 4
3 | (Argentina) C. Gutiérrez / (Argentina) Stupaczuk | 4 | 6 | 7
(Spain) J.M. Díaz / (Spain) Lebrón | 6 | 3 | 6

Finals
1 | (Argentina) Maxi / (Argentina) Sanyo | 6 | 6 | 2
4 | (Argentina) C. Gutiérrez / (Argentina) Stupaczuk | 2 | 7 | 6

=== Women's Bracket ===
Round of 32
1 | (Spain) Majo / (Spain) Mapi
Bye
(Spain) N. Marquez / (Spain) X. Clasca | 3 | 2
(Argentina) A. Osoro / (Argentina) N. Brito | 6 | 6
Q | (Spain) E. Carnicero / (Spain) M. Merino | 3 | 7 | 4
(Spain) M. Truchado / (Portugal) S. Araújo | 6 | 5 | 6
Q | (Spain) A. Rico / (Spain) I. Arzamendi | 2 | 4
(Spain) B. González / (Argentina) C. Tenorio | 6 | 6
(Spain) C. Navarro / (Argentina) C. Reiter | 6 | 6
(Spain) E. Ramírez / (Spain) R. Aguilar | 0 | 0
(Spain) P. Josemaria / (Argentina) V. Pavón | 3 | 6 | 4
(Spain) A.F. de Ossó / (Argentina) V. Riera | 6 | 2 | 6
Q | (Spain) A. Tapia / (Spain) J. Castelló | 4 | 3
(France) A. Collombon / (Spain) S. Pujals | 6 | 6
Bye
4 | (Spain) A. Sánchez / (Spain) M. Ortega
3 | (Spain) A. Salazar / (Spain) M. Marrero
Bye
Q | (Argentina) A. Berl / (Spain) A. Martinez | 4 | 1
(Spain) A. Galán / (Spain) M. Villalba | 6 | 6
(Spain) A. Blanco / (Spain) B. Caldera | 6 | 3
(Spain) S. Hernández / (Spain) V. Virseda | 7 | 6
(Portugal) A.C. Nogueira / (Argentina) Delfina | 7 | 6
(Spain) E. Amatriain / (Spain) P. Llaguno | 5 | 4
(Spain) T. Navarro / (Spain) V. Iglesias | 7 | 6
(Spain) C. Mesa / (Spain) L. Martínez | 6 | 3
(Spain) M. Gabarrus / (Spain) N. Rovira | 3 | 6 | 4
(Spain) A. Cantin / (Spain) N. Rodriguez | 6 | 3 | 6
(Spain) M. Talaván / (Spain) T. Icardo | 6 | 6 | 6
(Venezuela) A. Seijas Cali / (Spain) S. Ruiz | 7 | 1 | 0
Bye
2 | (Spain) Gemma / (Spain) L. Sainz

Round of 16
1 | (Spain) Majo / (Spain) Mapi | 6 | 6
(Argentina) A. Osoro / (Argentina) N. Brito | 4 | 2
(Spain) M. Truchado / (Portugal) S. Araújo | 3 | 3
(Spain) B. González / (Argentina) C. Tenorio | 6 | 6
(Spain) C. Navarro / (Argentina) C. Reiter | 7 | 5 | 6
(Spain) A.F. de Ossó / (Argentina) V. Riera | 5 | 7 | 3
(France) A. Collombon / (Spain) S. Pujals | 3 | 2
4 | (Spain) A. Sánchez / (Spain) M. Ortega | 6 | 6
3 | (Spain) A. Salazar / (Spain) M. Marrero | 6 | 6
(Spain) A. Galán / (Spain) M. Villalba | 2 | 1
(Spain) S. Hernández / (Spain) V. Virseda | 1 | 3
(Portugal) A.C. Nogueira / (Argentina) Delfina | 6 | 6
(Spain) T. Navarro / (Spain) V. Iglesias | 6 | 2 | 7
(Spain) A. Cantin / (Spain) N. Rodriguez | 3 | 6 | 6
(Spain) M. Talaván / (Spain) T. Icardo | 3 | 2
2 | (Spain) Gemma / (Spain) L. Sainz | 6 | 6

Quarter-Final
1 | (Spain) Majo / (Spain) Mapi | 6 | 6
(Spain) B. González / (Argentina) C. Tenorio | 3 | 1
(Spain) C. Navarro / (Argentina) C. Reiter | 3 | 1
4 | (Spain) A. Sánchez / (Spain) M. Ortega | 6 | 6
3 | (Spain) A. Salazar / (Spain) M. Marrero | 6 | 6
(Portugal) A.C. Nogueira / (Argentina) Delfina | 2 | 4
(Spain) T. Navarro / (Spain) V. Iglesias | 2 | 5
2 | (Spain) Gemma / (Spain) L. Sainz | 6 | 7

Semi-Finals
1 | (Spain) Majo / (Spain) Mapi | 2 | 4
4 | (Spain) A. Sánchez / (Spain) M. Ortega | 6 | 6
3 | (Spain) A. Salazar / (Spain) M. Marrero | 4 | 2
2 | (Spain) Gemma / (Spain) L. Sainz | 6 | 6

Finals
4 | (Spain) A. Sánchez / (Spain) M. Ortega | 1 | 4
2 | (Spain) Gemma / (Spain) L. Sainz | 6 | 6

== Results ==
=== Round of 32 ===
Men's
| Date | Winners | Score | Opponent | Ref. |
|---|---|---|---|---|
| 10/10/2018 | (Spain) Christian Fuster (Spain) Raúl Marcos Durán | 6–4 / 7–5 | (Argentina) Federico Quiles (Argentina) Maxi Grabiel | |
| 10/10/2018 | (Argentina) Juan Cruz Belluati (Spain) Pablo Lijó | 6–4 / 6–3 | (Argentina) Matías Nicoletti (Spain) Pedro Alonso Martínez | |
| 10/10/2018 | (Brazil) Lucas Bergamini (Brazil) Lucas Campagnolo | 6–4 / 6–1 | (Spain) Gonzalo Rubio (Spain) Ernesto Moreno | |
| 10/10/2018 | (Spain) Javi Ruiz (Spain) Uri Botello | 6–4 / 3–6 / 6–2 | (Spain) José García Diestro (Spain) Martin Sanchez Piñeiro | |
| 10/10/2018 | (Spain) Antonio Luque (Spain) Borja Yribarren | 6–0 / 3–6 / 6–4 | (Spain) Álvaro Cepero (Argentina) Sebastián Nerone | |
| 10/10/2018 | (Argentina) Germán Tamame (Spain) Nacho Gadea | 6–3 / 6–2 | (Brazil) Francisco Gomes (Argentina) Juan Manuel Restivo | |
| 10/10/2018 | (Spain) José Rico (Spain) Víctor Ruiz | 6–3 / 6–4 | (Spain) Jordi Muñoz (Spain) Willy Lahoz | |
| 10/10/2018 | (Argentina) Federico Chingotto (Argentina) Juan Tello | 6–4 / 6–3 | (Argentina) Agustín Gómez Silingo (Brazil) Marcelo Jardim | |
| 10/10/2018 | (Argentina) Lucho Capra (Argentina) Ramiro Moyano | 6–4 / 6–2 | (Spain) Adrián Blanco (Spain) Javier Martinez Vazquez | |
| 10/10/2018 | (Spain) Juan Lebrón (Spain) Juan Martin Díaz | 6–4 / 6–1 | (Uruguay) Diego Ramos (Spain) Rafael Méndez | |
| 10/10/2018 | (Spain) Coki Nieto (Spain) Javi Rico | 6–3 / 6–7 / 6–2 | (Argentina) Adrián Allemandi (Argentina) Fernando Poggi | |
| 10/10/2018 | (Spain) Aday Santana (Argentina) Godo Díaz | 3–6 / 6–4 / 6–3 | (Spain) Alejandro Ruiz (Spain) Javi Garrido | |

Women's
| Date | Winners | Score | Opponent | Ref. |
|---|---|---|---|---|
| 10/10/2018 | (Argentina) Aranzazu Osoro (Argentina) Nela Brito | 6–3 / 6–2 | (Spain) Noelia Marquez (Spain) Xenia Clasca | |
| 10/10/2018 | (Spain) Meli García Truchado (Portugal) Sofia Araújo | 6–3 / 5–7 / 6–4 | (Spain) Esther Carnicero (Spain) Melania Merino | |
| 10/10/2018 | (Spain) Beatriz González (Argentina) Catalina Tenorio | 6–2 / 6–4 | (Spain) Ainhoa Rico Martín (Spain) Irene Arzamendi | |
| 10/10/2018 | (Spain) Carolina Navarro (Argentina) Cecilia Reiter | 6–0 / 6–0 | (Spain) Elena Ramírez (Spain) Raquel Segura Aguilar | |
| 10/10/2018 | (Spain) Ana Fernández de Ossó (Argentina) Virginia Riera | 6–3 / 2–6 / 6–4 | (Spain) Paula Josemaria (Argentina) Valeria Pavón | |
| 10/10/2018 | (France) Alix Collombon (Spain) Sara Pujals | 6–4 / 6–3 | (Spain) Anna Cortiles Tapia (Spain) Jessica Castelló | |
| 10/10/2018 | (Spain) Alba Galán (Spain) Maria Villalba | 6–4 / 6–1 | (Argentina) Alicia Lilian Berl (Spain) Araceli Martinez | |
| 10/10/2018 | (Spain) Sandra Hernández (Spain) Verónica Virseda | 7–6 / 6–3 | (Spain) Alicia Blanco Rojo (Spain) Beatriz Caldera | |
| 10/10/2018 | (Portugal) Ana Catarina Nogueira (Argentina) Delfina Brea | 7–5 / 6–4 | (Spain) Elisabeth Amatriain (Spain) Patricia Llaguno | |
| 10/10/2018 | (Spain) Teresa Navarro (Spain) Victoria Iglesias | 7–6 / 6–3 | (Spain) Carla Mesa (Spain) Lucía Martínez | |
| 10/10/2018 | (Spain) Angela Caro Cantin (Spain) Nuria Rodriguez | 6–3 / 3–6 / 6–4 | (Spain) Lorena Alonso (Spain) Maite Gabarrus | |
| 10/10/2018 | (Spain) Marta Talaván (Spain) Tamara Icardo | 6–7 / 6–1 / 6–0 | (Venezuela) Ana Seijas Cali (Spain) Sara Ruiz | |

=== Round of 16 ===
Men's
| Date | Winners | Score | Opponent | Ref. |
|---|---|---|---|---|
| 11/10/2018 | (Argentina) Maxi Sánchez (Argentina) Sanyo Gutiérrez | 7–6 / 3–6 / 6–1 | (Spain) Christian Fuster (Spain) Raúl Marcos Durán | |
| 11/10/2018 | (Argentina) Juan Cruz Belluati (Spain) Pablo Lijó | 6–3 / 7–6 | (Brazil) Lucas Bergamini (Brazil) Lucas Campagnolo | |
| 11/10/2018 | (Spain) Javi Ruiz (Spain) Uri Botello | 2–6 / 7–6 / 6–3 | (Spain) Antonio Luque (Spain) Borja Yribarren | |
| 11/10/2018 | (Spain) Juani Mieres (Argentina) Miguel Lamperti | 6–4 / 7–6 | (Argentina) Germán Tamame (Spain) Nacho Gadea | |
| 11/10/2018 | (Argentina) Cristian Gutiérrez (Argentina) Franco Stupaczuk | 6–7 / 6–3 / 7–5 | (Spain) José Rico (Spain) Víctor Ruiz | |
| 11/10/2018 | (Argentina) Lucho Capra (Argentina) Ramiro Moyano | 6–3 / 6–2 | (Argentina) Federico Chingotto (Argentina) Juan Tello | |
| 11/10/2018 | (Spain) Juan Lebrón (Spain) Juan Martin Díaz | 5–7 / 6–0 / 6–1 | (Spain) Coki Nieto (Spain) Javi Rico | |
| 11/10/2018 | (Spain) Alejandro Galán (Spain) Matías Díaz | 3–6 / 6–0 / 6–3 | (Spain) Aday Santana (Argentina) Godo Díaz | |

Women's
| Date | Winners | Score | Opponent | Ref. |
|---|---|---|---|---|
| 11/10/2018 | (Spain) Majo Sánchez (Spain) Mapi Sánchez | 6–4 / 6–2 | (Argentina) Aranzazu Osoro (Argentina) Nela Brito | |
| 11/10/2018 | (Spain) Beatriz González (Argentina) Catalina Tenorio | 6–3 / 6–3 | (Spain) Meli García Truchado (Portugal) Sofia Araújo | |
| 11/10/2018 | (Spain) Carolina Navarro (Argentina) Cecilia Reiter | 7–5 / 5–7 / 6–3 | (Spain) Ana Fernández de Ossó (Argentina) Virginia Riera | |
| 11/10/2018 | (Spain) Ariana Sánchez (Spain) Marta Ortega | 6–3 / 6–2 | (France) Alix Collombon (Spain) Sara Pujals | |
| 11/10/2018 | (Spain) Alejandra Salazar (Spain) Marta Marrero | 6–2 / 6–1 | (Spain) Alba Galán (Spain) Maria Villalba | |
| 11/10/2018 | (Portugal) Ana Catarina Nogueira (Argentina) Delfina Brea | 6–1 / 6–3 | (Spain) Sandra Hernández (Spain) Verónica Virseda | |
| 11/10/2018 | (Spain) Teresa Navarro (Spain) Victoria Iglesias | 6–3 / 2–6 / 7–6 | (Spain) Angela Caro Cantin (Spain) Nuria Rodriguez | |
| 11/10/2018 | (Spain) Gemma Triay (Spain) Lucía Sainz | 6–3 / 6–2 | (Spain) Marta Talaván (Spain) Tamara Icardo | |

=== Quarter-Finals ===
Men's
| Date | Winners | Score | Opponent | Ref. |
|---|---|---|---|---|
| 12/10/2018 | (Argentina) Maxi Sánchez (Argentina) Sanyo Gutiérrez | 6–3 / 6–4 | (Argentina) Juan Cruz Belluati (Spain) Pablo Lijó | |
| 12/10/2018 | (Spain) Juani Mieres (Argentina) Miguel Lamperti | 6–3 / 6–7 / 6–3 | (Spain) Javi Ruiz (Spain) Uri Botello | |
| 12/10/2018 | (Argentina) Cristian Gutiérrez (Argentina) Franco Stupaczuk | 7–6 / 6–2 | (Argentina) Lucho Capra (Argentina) Ramiro Moyano | |
| 12/10/2018 | (Spain) Juan Lebrón (Spain) Juan Martin Díaz | 6–4 / 3–6 / 7–6 | (Spain) Alejandro Galán (Spain) Matías Díaz | |

Women's
| Date | Winners | Score | Opponent | Ref. |
|---|---|---|---|---|
| 12/10/2018 | (Spain) Majo Sánchez (Spain) Mapi Sánchez | 6–3 / 6–1 | (Spain) Beatriz González (Argentina) Catalina Tenorio | |
| 12/10/2018 | (Spain) Ariana Sánchez (Spain) Marta Ortega | 6–3 / 6–1 | (Spain) Carolina Navarro (Argentina) Cecilia Reiter | |
| 12/10/2018 | (Spain) Alejandra Salazar (Spain) Marta Marrero | 6–2 / 6–4 | (Portugal) Ana Catarina Nogueira (Argentina) Delfina Brea | |
| 12/10/2018 | (Spain) Gemma Triay (Spain) Lucía Sainz | 6–2 / 7–5 | (Spain) Teresa Navarro (Spain) Victoria Iglesias | |

=== Semi-Finals ===
Men's
| Date | Winners | Score | Opponent | Ref. |
|---|---|---|---|---|
| 13/10/2018 | (Argentina) Maxi Sánchez (Argentina) Sanyo Gutiérrez | 6–1 / 6–4 | (Spain) Juani Mieres (Argentina) Miguel Lamperti | |
| 13/10/2018 | (Argentina) Cristian Gutiérrez (Argentina) Franco Stupaczuk | 4–6 / 6–3 / 7–6 | (Spain) Juan Lebrón (Spain) Juan Martin Díaz | |

Women's
| Date | Winners | Score | Opponent | Ref. |
|---|---|---|---|---|
| 13/10/2018 | (Spain) Ariana Sánchez (Spain) Marta Ortega | 6–2 / 6–4 | (Spain) Majo Sánchez (Spain) Mapi Sánchez | |
| 13/10/2018 | (Spain) Gemma Triay (Spain) Lucía Sainz | 6–4 / 6–2 | (Spain) Alejandra Salazar (Spain) Marta Marrero | |

=== Finals ===
Men's
| Date | Winners | Score | Opponent | Ref. |
|---|---|---|---|---|
| 14/10/2018 | (Argentina) Cristian Gutiérrez (Argentina) Franco Stupaczuk | 2–6 / 7–6 / 6–2 | (Argentina) Maxi Sánchez (Argentina) Sanyo Gutiérrez | |

Women's
| Date | Winners | Score | Opponent | Ref. |
|---|---|---|---|---|
| 14/10/2018 | (Spain) Gemma Triay (Spain) Lucía Sainz | 6–1 / 6–4 | (Spain) Ariana Sánchez (Spain) Marta Ortega | |
