= Juan Martín Díaz Martínez =

Argentinian tennis player

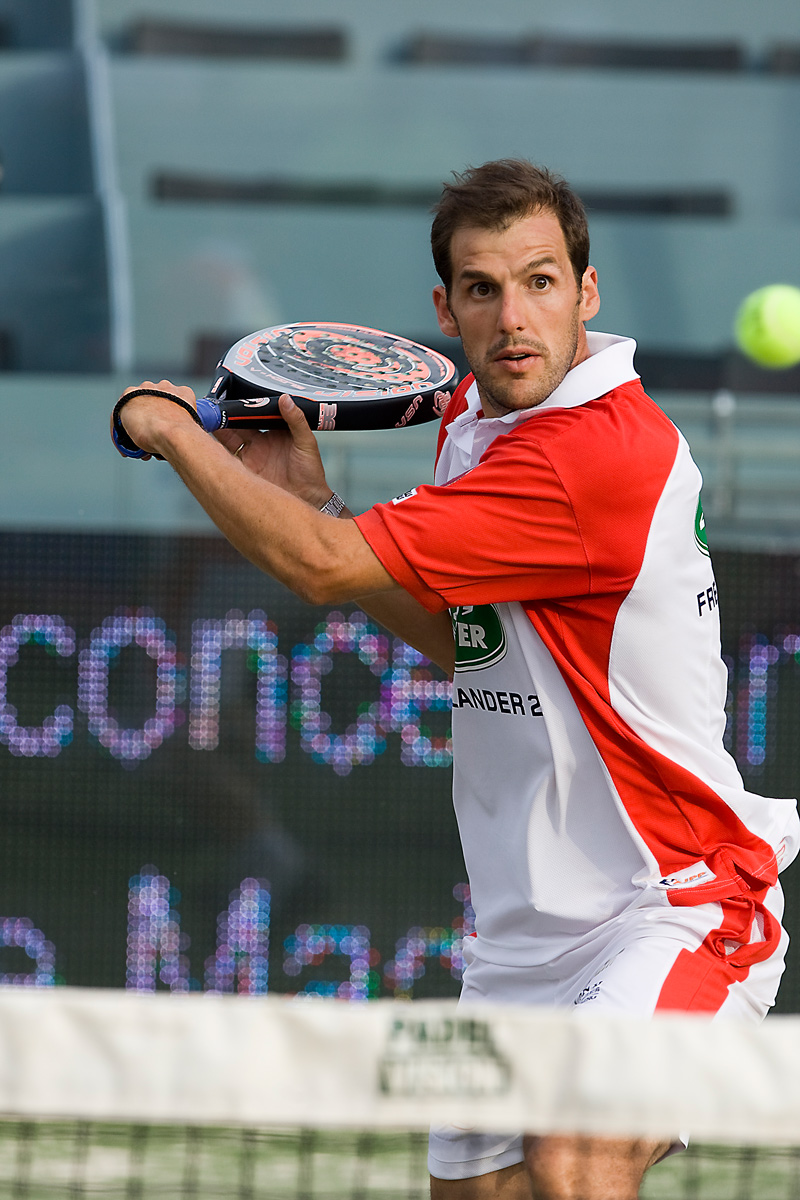

Personal information
- Full name: Juan Martín Díaz Martínez
- Nicknames: El Galleguito; El Señor de los reflejos
- Citizenship: Argentine; Spanish
- Born: November 28, 1975 (age 50) Mar del Plata, Argentina
- Height: 1.84 m (6 ft 1/2 in)
- Weight: 74 kg (163 lb)
- Spouse: Victoria Wehncke
- Children: Buenjamon Diaz; Martina Diaz; Valentina Diaz

Sport
- Sport: Padel
- Turned pro: 1994
- Retired: 2023

Achievements and titles
- Highest world ranking: 1st (2000, 2002–2014)

Juan Martín Díaz Martínez (born 28 November 1975 in Mar del Plata, Argentina), known as Juan Martín Díaz, is a professional padel player from Argentina. He became world number one for the first time in 2000 with Hernan Auguste, but its most successful partnership came two with Fernando Belasteguín, together they had the most dominant run in the sport history, remaining undefeated for 1 year and 9 months and winning 22 consecutive tournaments between September 2005 and May 2007. They also hold the record for the longest period as the world's No. 1 ranked team, topping the rankings for 13 straight seasons (2002–2014) and winning 170 out of 191 finals played; thus becoming considered the best padel pair in history.

== Career ==
=== Early life ===
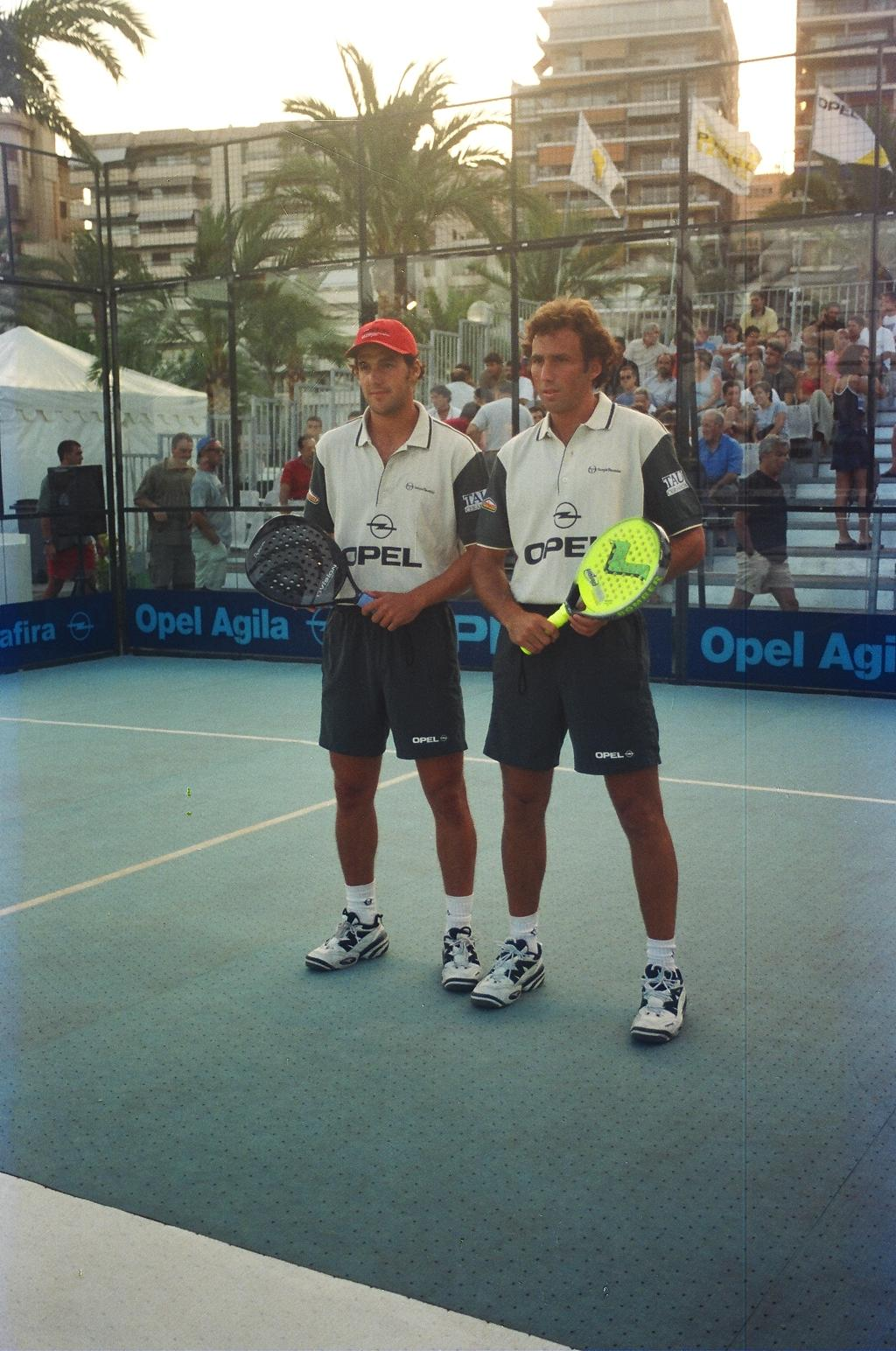
Juan Martín Díaz and Hernán Auguste in 2001.

Juan was born on November 28, 1975, in Mar del Plata, Argentina. He currently lives in Madrid with his family, where he has lived for several years.

As a child, he wanted to be a tennis player, and the Davis Cup was his ultimate goal. He spent long hours at the sports club playing with his friends. In the late 1980s, he started playing padel, practically as soon as it arrived in Argentina. Gradually he gave up tennis to dedicate himself fully to the new sport.

=== Transition into professional padel and first partners ===
His first step into professional padel was in 1994, thanks to Paco Pellejo, who chose him as his partner.

With the support of his family, he began developing his professional career alongside his studies. In 1997 he moved to Spain, and the following year he was selected to compete in the World Championship as a Spaniard in his hometown of Mar del Plata, Argentina.

=== First number one ranking and partnership with Fernando Belasteguín ===
In 2000 playing alongside Hernán Auguste, they established themselves as one of the best pairs in the world, winning several tournaments on the Spanish circuit, including those in Sotogrande, Altea, Benicasim, and Madrid, and challenging Gabriel Reca and Sebastián Nerone for the top spot. In 2001, they won two titles in Seville, as well as titles in Altea, Sotogrande, Barcelona, and Bilbao, finishing as the best ranked pair of the year, ahead of Fernando Belasteguín and Pablo Martínez Semprún.

=== Partnership with Juan Martín Díaz ===
==== 2002 ====
In 2002 he joined forces with the Argentinean Fernando Belasteguín, who was the No. 2 ranked in both international and Spanish circuits at the time with Semprún. Together they would be ranked as the No. 1 pair for 13 consecutive years, holding the unbeaten record with 1 year and 9 months without losing a match, winning 22 consecutive tournaments between September 2005 and June 2007.

In 2002, they first year together, they finished the year as the best duo in the world. They reached the final of each tournament they competed in, losing only three times, one of them against their former partners, Auguste and Semprún. They won the Bilbao, San Sebastián, Altea and Sotogrande Open's, the Torre Bellver and El Puerto de Santa María International's, the Santander Open and the Madrid International's, Barcelona International's, Bilbao II, and Seville International's. With these results, they finished the season as No. 1 on both Spanish and international circuits. They also won the World Doubles Championship, defeating Gaby Reca and Seba Nerone in the final.

==== 2003 ====
In 2003, Díaz and Belasteguín dominated both national and international circuits, finishing the season as the number one ranked team in both circuits. They won the Melilla, Valladolid, Bilbao, Oropesa del Mar, Marbella, Madrid, and Seville International's, with their main rivals being Gaby Reca and Seba Nerone, once again. One of their few defeats came at the Real Club de Polo de Barcelona tournament, where, despite winning the first set and leading 3–1 in the second, they lost to Cristian Gutiérrez and Roby Gattiker. Their results granted another No. 1 finish on both Spanish and International circuits.

==== 2004 ====
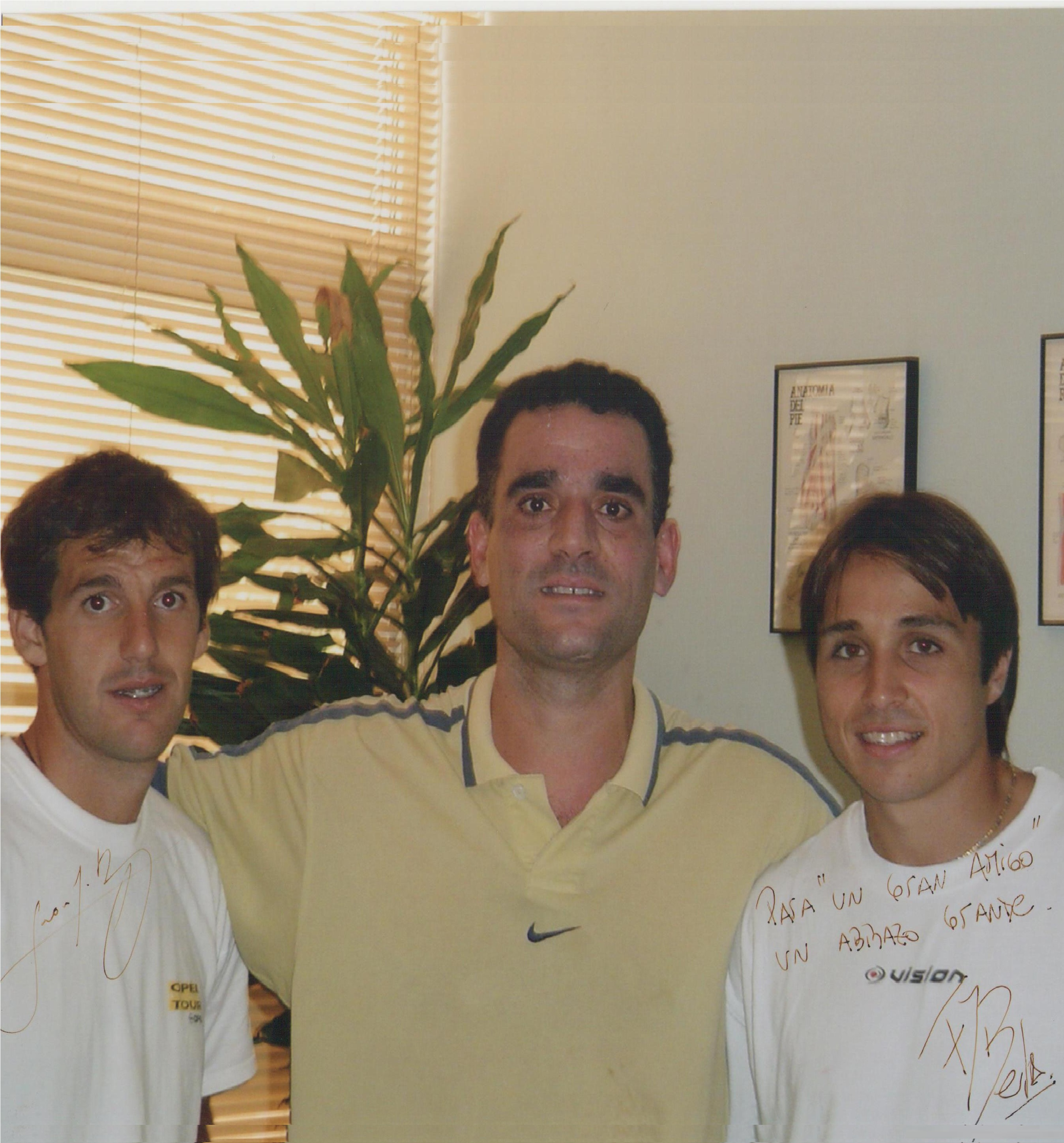
A young Belasteguín and Juan Martín

In 2004, Belasteguín and Díaz finished the season ranked No. 1 for a third consecutive year. They won the Bilbao, Melilla, Seville, Valladolid and Barcelona International's, the Cantabria Open, the Cádiz, El Puerto de Santa María, Madrid and Seville International's, and the Madrid Masters. Their closest rivals, were once again Reca and Nerone. During the Valladolid tournament, hours before the quarter-finals, Díaz and Belasteguín traveled to Madrid for the birth of Díaz son, but returned in time for their match. After the end of the Spanish and International circuitis, Belasteguín and Díaz were crowned World Doubles champions for the second time, in Buenos Aires, defeating Reca and Nerone in the final. Díaz also played in the World Championship, representing Spain losing in the final against Argentina.

==== 2005 ====
In 2005, Díaz and Belasteguín won eleven of the fourteen circuit tournaments, winning the Barcelona International, the Bilbao Open, the Valencia, Lisbon and Córdoba International's, the Madrid Masters, the Higuerón and Torre Bellver International's, the Islas Baleares Masters, and the Badajoz and Bilbao International's. After a semifinal loss at the Madrid International in September, against Cristian Gutiérrez and Hernán Auguste, they began an unbeaten streak that lasted 1 year and 9 months, during which they won 22 consecutive titles.

=== Padel Pro Tour years ===
==== 2006 ====
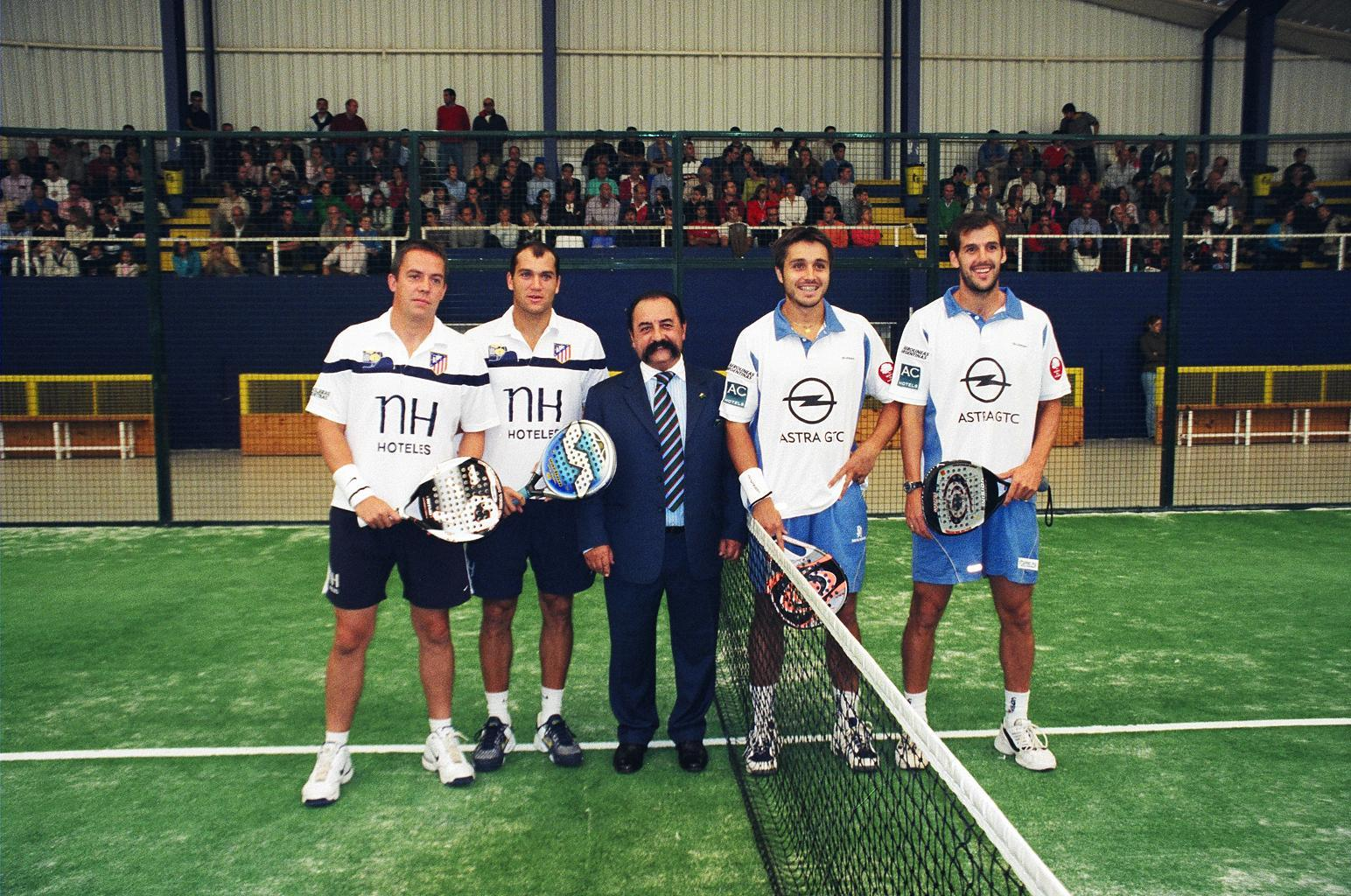
Gaby Reca and Seba Nerone (left) before facing Bela and Díaz(right

In 2006, they completed a perfect season, winning all 17 tournaments in the inaugural edition of the Padel Pro Tour (PPT), the first organized international professional padel circuit. Their closest rivals, Reca and Nerone, remained well behind. Due to disputes between the PPT, the Spanish Padel Federation, and FIP, Belasteguín and Díaz didn't participate in the World Doubles Championship that year, but did play in the World Championship, where Spain was unable to reach the finals.

==== 2007 ====
In 2007, Belasteguín and Díaz won the Córdoba, Barcelona, Madrid, Valencia, Vitoria, Madrid II, Oropesa del Mar, Salamanca, Fuengirola, Cádiz, Palma de Mallorca, Mérida, San Sebastián, Zaragoza, Bilbao, Las Palmas, and Alicante International's, and the Madrid Masters. Their unbeaten streak came to an end in the fourth tournament of the season, in Valladolid, where they were defeated by Cristian Gutiérrez and Seba Nerone. During the season, they suffered only two more losses, both in semifinals against Auguste and Reca, in Seville and Logroño.

==== 2008 ====
In 2008, they extended their dominance, winning the Ciudad Real, Granada, Santander, Barcelona, Majadahonda, Logroño, Vitoria, Comunidad de Madrid, Marbella, Fuengirola, Benicasim, Mallorca, Mérida, San Sebastián, Zaragoza, and Bilbao International's. The Fuengirola tournament win marked their 100th title won as team, won in the same venue where they first competed together. Despite a surprising elimination in the group stage at the Madrid Masters, they finished the season as the number one ranked team for a seventh consecutive year. Díaz didn't compete in the 2008 World Championship nor the World Doubles champions held in Calgary.

==== 2009 ====
The 2009 season began with two consecutive semifinal defeats, first in Granada against Matí Díaz and Miguel Lamperti, followed by a loss to Juani Mieres and Pablo Lima in Madrid. They reacted winning the Barcelona, Córdoba, Valladolid, and Alicante International's, but were eliminated in the quarterfinals of the Madrid International by Mieres and Lima. They won the Marbella International, but were eliminated in the next four tournaments, with losses in the Fuengirola and Islas Baleares finals, and the Castellón and Sevilla semifinals. They responded with five straight title wins in the San Sebastián, Zaragoza, Bilbao, Valencia, and Ciudad Real International's. They were forced to miss tournaments in La Rioja and A Coruña do to injuries, but returned in Salamanca, reaching the final but losing it to Mieres and Lima. They finished the season winning the Madrid Masters, and securing their eighth consecutive first place rank in the international circuit.

==== 2010 ====
In 2010, they missed the first two tournaments of the season due to a Belasteguín's injury, with Díaz temporarily competing Roby Gattiker. In their reuturning tournaments, in the Mar del Plata and Ciudad Real International's, Belasteguín and Díaz reached the semifinals and were eliminated in the quarterfinals, respectively. They won the San Sebastián International, but in Madrid were eliminated in the semifinals by the second ranked pair, Mieres and Lima. They won the next six International's in Barcelona, Alicante, Madrid, Castellón, Marbella, and Fuengirola. Despite an unexpected loss, in the Palma de Mallorca semifinals and a defeat in the Seville final, they won the four more International tournaments in Pamplona, Bilbao, Murcia, and La Rioja, and finished the season winning the Madrid Masters. They finished the season as the number one ranked team.

==== 2011 ====
In 2011, Belasteguín and Díaz started the season with a loss in the Mendoza International final, against Juani Mieres and Pablo Lima. They didn't compete in Tarragona due to Belasteguín's injury, but returned winning two consecutive titles, the Madrid and Barcelona International's. They were eliminated in the Córdoba International quarterfinals by Sanyo Gutiérrez and Seba Nerone, but responded winning the Valladolid, Alicante, Castellón, and Marbella International's. In Fuengirola, they were surprisingly defeated in the round-of-16, but rebounded winning the Gijón International. They lost in Palma de Mallorca to Nerone and Gutiérrez, but finished the season winning the Seville, Madrid, Bilbao, Logroño, and Vitoria-Gasteiz International's. Their final match of the year was a quarterfinal loss at the Madrid Masters against Reca and Silingo.

==== 2012 ====
The 2012 season was the most difficult for the pair so far, beginning with a loss in the final of the Mendoza International, and followed by a win in the Buenos Aires International. Belasteguín and Díaz competed in the World Doubles Championship in Barcelona, having missed the 2006, 2008, and 2010 editions due to disputes between PPT and FIP. They were eliminated in the quarterfinals by Cristian Gutiérrez and Fernando Poggi. They responded winning the Madrid, Barcelona, Córdoba, and Valladolid International's. A semifinal loss in Alicante against Nerone and Gutiérrez didn't affect them, as they won the next four International's tournament in Marbella, Fuengirola, Mallorca, and Ibiza. They didn't compete in Acapulco, returning in the Madrid International, and winning it. Due to a Belasteguín's injury, they didn't compete in Seville and were eliminated in the quarterfinals of the Valencia International by a young Paquito Navarro. The injury also forced Belasteguín to miss tournaments in Bilbao, La Rioja, and the Madrid Masters. Despite not competing in the last three tournaments, Belasteguín and Díaz had already secured the number 1 Ranking, finishing the season as the No. 1 team for the eleventh consecutive year and reaching a decade as the top pair in professional padel.

=== World Padel Tour ===
==== 2013 ====
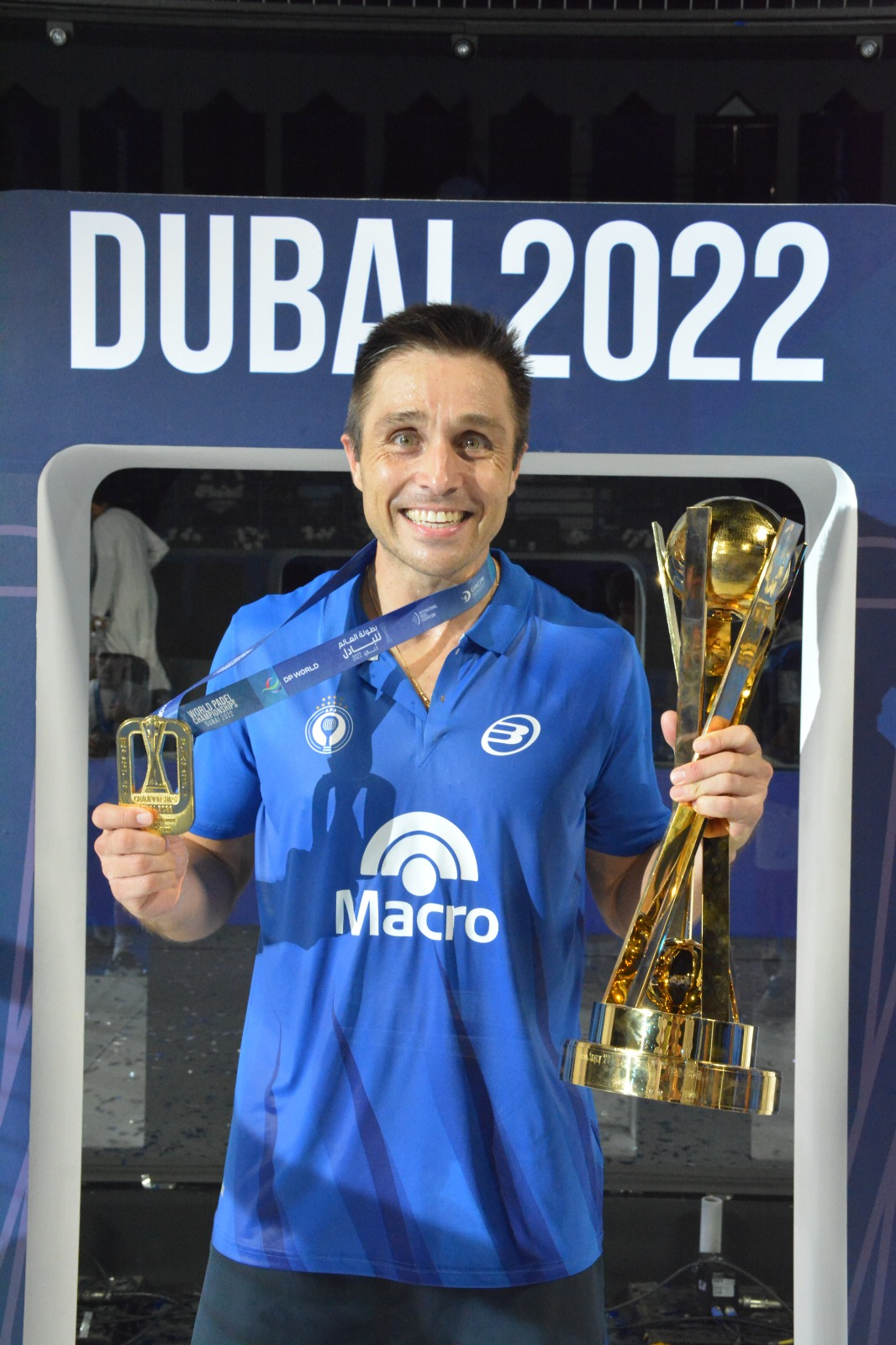
Fernando Belasteguín, who along with Díaz, was number one ranked for thirteen seasons

In 2013, Belasteguín and Díaz joined the newly created World Padel Tour (WPT), an international professional circuit that aimed to expand padel on a global level. They began the season, winning the Murcia, Seville, Cáceres, and Barcelona Open's. Their first defeat of the season came in the final of the Madrid Open, in Caja Mágica, against the No.2 ranked pair, Pablo Lima and Juani Mieres. The defeat was followed by a first-round elimination in A Coruña Open. Belasteguín missed the Santander Open due to injury, returning in the Puerto de Santa María Open and losing in the semifinals, leaving the No. 1 Ranking under threat. Bela and Díaz, answered by winning the Málaga, Castellón, La Nucia, Bilbao, and Granada Open's, defeating Lima and Mieres in the last final and securing the first Ranking position. In the last five tournaments of the season, they won the first in Lisbon, but were defeated in Las Palmas and Valencia, were eliminated in the quarterfinal in the Buenos Aires and Córdoba Open's, and finished the season with a semifinal loss against Lima and Mieres at the Master Finals.

==== 2014 ====
They began the season defeating Lima and Mieres in the finals of the Barcelona and Badajoz Open's. They briefly lost the No. 1 Ranking for one week, but regained it winning the Córdoba Open. They finished runners-up in Castellón and were eliminated from the Málaga Open by Sanyo Gutiérrez and Maxi Sánchez. Belasteguín and Díaz won the Marbella Open, giving Belasteguín's its 165th professional title. Before the Alicante Open, where they lost in the final to Lima and Mieres, Belasteguín and Díaz announced that they would part ways at the end of the season. Despite the announcement, they won four more titles in Alcobendas, Seville, Lisbon, and Tenerife Open's. They finished runners-up in the Valencia Open, against Maxi Grabiel and Paquito Navarro and did not compete in San Fernando. Their last title win came in the Córdoba Open. They played their last game together, in the Madrid Master Final, where they reached the final but were defeated by Sanyo and Sánchez.

During their thirteen seasons together, Belasteguín and Díaz finished every year as the first ranked pair. They competed in 176 major finals and won 156 titles, a record that remains unmatched in professional padel.

=== 2015 ===
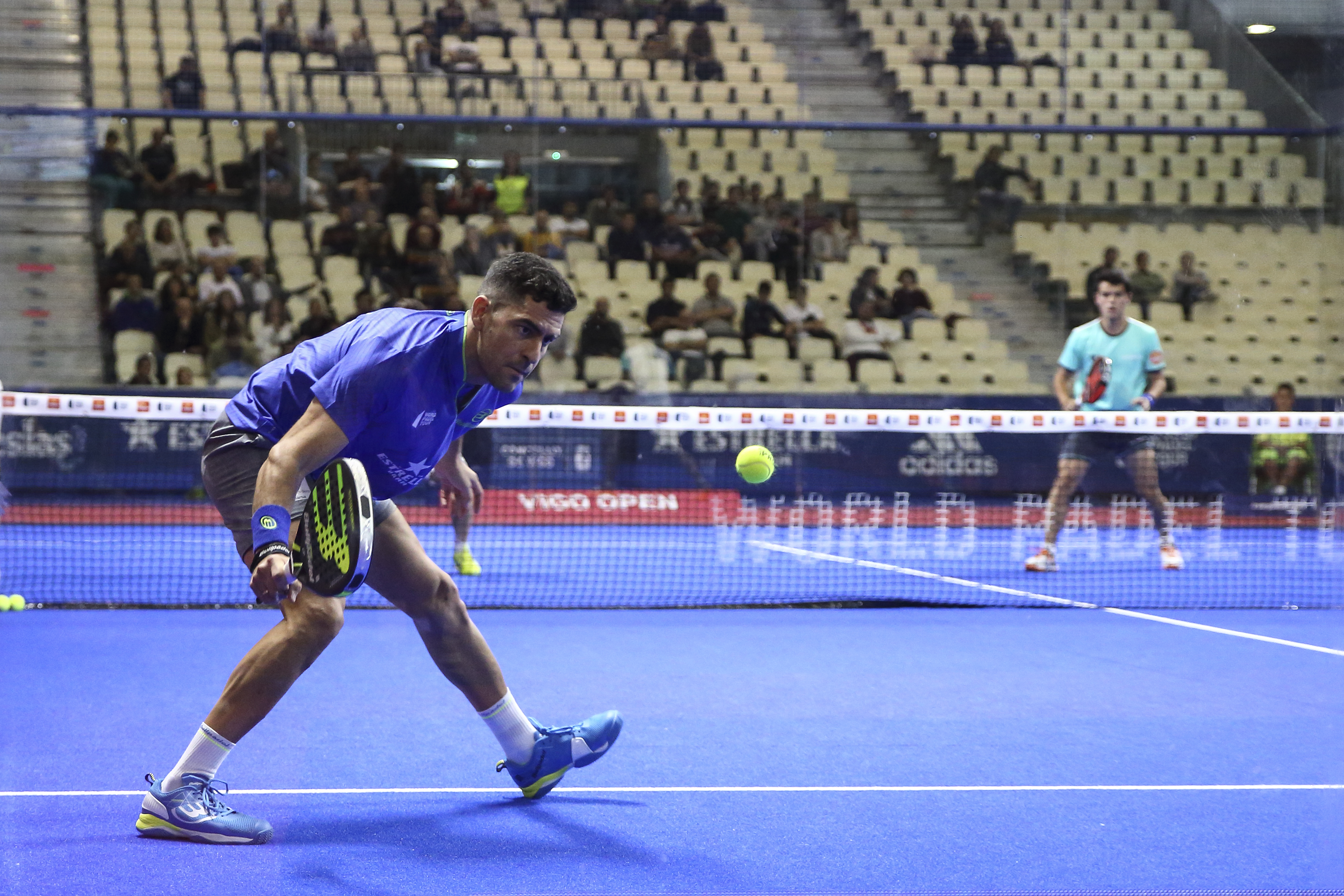
Maxi Sanchéz who played with Díaz in 2015.

In 2015, Díaz and Belasteguín split up, with Juan Martín teaming up first with Juani Mieres. The experienced pair played only five tournaments together, with their best results being two semi-final appearances.

He then joined forces with Maxi Sánchez. They started their run reaching the finals of the Mallorca Open, the Málaga Master and the La Nucía Open, losing the three to Belasteguín and Pablo Lima. After two consecutive semi-finals and quarter-final exiting, they reached the final of the Galicia Open, but once again lost to Belasteguín and Lima.

After three more eliminations in the semi-finals, they finished the season by winning the Master Final in Madrid. Díaz finished the season ranked eight in FIP ranking.

=== 2016 ===
In 2016, Juan Martín announced that his new partner would be Cristián Gutiérrez. After two disappointing tournaments, they reached the final of the Barcelona Master where they lost to Belasteguín and Lima. After a quarter-final exit in the next tournament, they reach the final of Mallorca Open in a rematch of the Barcelona final, losing once again. In the next four tournaments Díaz and Gutiérrez were unable to reach a semi-final.

In the Seville Open and the A Coruña Open, Díaz along with his Federico Quiles, reached the semi-finals, but was unable to reach the finals. In his last three tournaments with Gutiérrez they achieved one first round and two quarter-finals exits.

=== 2017 ===
Díaz missed a major part of the season, not competing in any World Padel Tour tournament. This was the first season Díaz didn't reach a final in his professional career.

Despite not competing in WPT, Juan Martín made a strong comeback at the 2017 European Padel Championships, where after two disappointing years, won the title representing Spain. In that tournament, Juan Martín partnered with Paquito Navarro, securing a 6–1 / 6–4 victory in their match.

=== 2018 ===
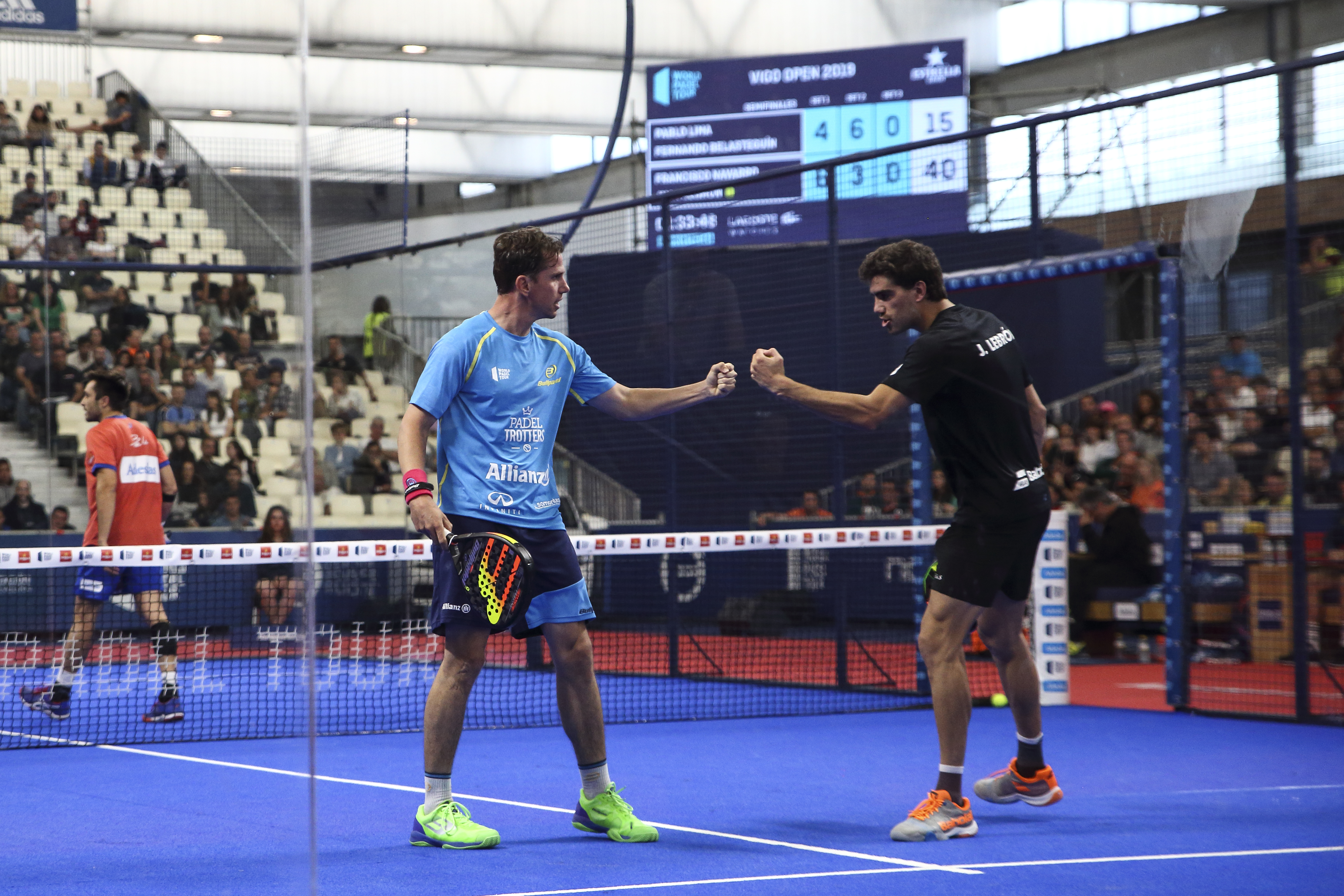
Paquito Navarro (left) and Juan Lebrón (right), who teamed with Díaz in 2018.

After Sanyo Gutiérrez and Paquito Navarro broke up, Paquito became Juan Martin new partner in World Padel Tour for the 2018 season, largely due to the high level they both showed playing together with the Spanish national team. In their first tournament together, the Catalunya Master, they only managed to reach the quarterfinals. They improved their performance in the second tournament of the season, the Alicante Open, where they reached the semifinals. In the next two tournament, the Zaragoza Open and the Jaén Open, they lost in the finals against Maxi Sánchez and Sanyo Gutiérrez.

Two tournaments later they reached another final, in Bastad, where they lost against Fernando Belasteguín and Pablo Lima. In the next four tournaments they managed to reach to semi-finals but we're unable to progress to the final.

In the eleventh tournament of the season, the Portugal Master, they suffered a serious setback, as during the semi-final match, Paquito Navarro saw a glass panel on the court break over him, forcing them to abandon the tournament. Juani Mieres and Miguel Lamperti, their opponents in the semi-finals, thus advanced to the final.

After Paquito was unable to compete in the Granada Open, Juan Martín teamed with breakthrough player of the year Juan Lebrón to compete in the end of the season. Together they reached the semi-finals in their debut tournament and the quarter-finals in their next. Díaz played the Buenos Aires Master with Paquito but couldn't get past the semi-finals, a result he would repeat in the final two tournament with Lebrón.

=== Final Years ===
In the next five years Díaz teamed with various partners, but was unable to reach any final, gradually losing prominence and retiring in 2023, twenty-six years after becoming a professional.

Díaz ended his career having played in two hundred fifty-three finals on the main padel circuits, winning two hundred and six and being the world number one for fourteen years.

== Honours ==
=== Spanish and International Circuit (1997–2005) ===
Win Draw Loss

==== Finals ====
N.º	Year	Tournament	Category	Partner	Opponents in the final	Result	Career title No.
1	25 May 1997	(Spain) Estrella Damm La Moraleja	Estrella Damm Circuit	(Spain) Alberto Rodríguez Piñón	(Spain) Pablo Semprún (Spain) Raúl Arias		
2	8 June 1997	(Spain) Torneo Nacional OKI de Sevilla	OKI Circuit	(Spain) Alberto Rodríguez Piñón	(Spain) Rúben Gómez (Spain) Willy Lahoz		1st
3	15 June 1997	(Spain) Estrella Damm SEK Villafranca	Estrella Damm Circuit	(Spain) Alberto Rodríguez Piñón	(Spain) Pablo Semprún (Spain) Raúl Arias		2nd
4	6 July 1997	(Spain) Torneo Nacional OKI de Barcelona	OKI Circuit	(Spain) Alberto Rodríguez Piñón	(Spain) Jsoé Maria Montes (Spain) Oscar Inglés		3rd
5	14 September 1997	(Spain) Spanish National Championship	National Championship	(Spain) Alberto Rodríguez Piñón	(Spain) Ramiro Choya (Spain) Willy Lahoz		4th
6	21 September 1997	(Spain) IV Internacional Spanish Championship	International Championship	(Spain) Alberto Rodríguez Piñón	(Argentina) Alejandro Lasaigues (Argentina) Hernán Auguste		5th
7	28 September 1997	(Spain) II Eudaski International Championship	International Championship	(Spain) Alberto Rodríguez Piñón	(Spain) Gastón Malacalza (Spain) Marcelo Pérez		6th
8	5 October 1997	(Spain) Caja Madrid Internacional	Caja Madrid Circuit	(Spain) Alberto Rodríguez Piñón	(Spain) Pablo Semprún (Spain) Raúl Arias		7th
9	26 October 1997	(Spain) Estrella Damm Sport Penta Padel	Estrella Damm Circuit	(Spain) Alberto Rodríguez Piñón	(Spain) Pablo Semprún (Spain) Raúl Arias		8th
10	9 November 1997	(Spain) Estrella Damm Internacional	Estrella Damm Circuit	(Spain) Alberto Rodríguez Piñón	(Spain) Pablo Semprún (Spain) Raúl Arias		9th
11	23 November 1997	(Spain) II European Championship	International Championship	(Spain) Alberto Rodríguez Piñón	(Spain) Pablo Semprún (Spain) Raúl Arias		10th
12	14 December 1997	(Spain) Masters Nacional Estrella Damm	Estrella Damm Circuit	(Spain) Alberto Rodríguez Piñón	(Spain) Antonio Ochoa (Spain) Willy Lahoz		11th
13	25 April 1998	(Spain) Volvo Turismos Madrid	National Tournaments	(Spain) José María Montes	(Spain) Alberto Rodríguez Piñón (Argentina) Cristian Gutiérrez		12th
14	27 June 1998	(Spain) Spanish National Championship	National Championship	(Spain) José María Montes	(Spain) Raul Arias (Spain) Willy Lahoz		13th
15	4 July 1998	(Spain) Torneo Nacional Adecco	National Tournaments	(Spain) José María Montes	(Spain) Pablo Semprún (Spain) Pablo Rovaletti		
16	19 September 1998	(Spain) III European Championship	National Tournaments	(Spain) José María Montes	(Spain) Raúl Arias (Spain) Willy Lahoz		14th
17	3 October 1998	(Spain) IV Eudaski International Championship	National Tournaments	(Spain) José María Montes	(Argentina) Alejandro Lasaigues (Argentina) Roberto Gattiker		
18	28 November 1998	(Spain) Spanish Mixed Championship	National Championship	(Spain) Carolina Navarro	(Spain) Iciar Montes (Spain) José María Montes		15th
19	xx/xx/1998	(Argentina) World Doubles Championship	World Championship	(Spain) Alberto Rodríguez Piñón	(Argentina) Cristian Gutiérrez (Argentina) Roberto Gattiker		
20	2 April 2000	(Spain) Opel Padel Tour Sevilla	National Tournaments	(Argentina) Hernán Auguste	(Spain) Leo Padovani (Spain) Willy Lahoz		16th
21	16 April 2000	(Spain) Ciudad de Alzira	National Tournaments	(Argentina) Hernán Auguste	(Spain) José María Montes (Argentina) Mariano Lasaigues		17th
22	22 April 2000	(Spain) Sotogrande	National Tournaments	(Argentina) Hernán Auguste	(Spain) Pablo Semprún (Spain) Pablo Rovaletti		18th
23	21 May 2000	(Spain) Opel Padel Tour Barcelona	National Tournaments	(Argentina) Hernán Auguste	(Spain) José María Montes (Argentina) Mariano Lasaigues		19th
24	18 June 2000	(Spain) Spanish National Championship	National Championship	(Spain) José María Montes	(Spain) Raul Arias (Spain) Willy Lahoz		
25	25 June 2000	(Spain) I Fundacion Tierras Del Sur International Champiosnhip	International Championship	(Argentina) Hernán Auguste	(Argentina) Gabriel Reca (Argentina) Sebastián Nerone		
26	2 July 2000	(France) World Doubles Championship	World Championship	(Argentina) Hernán Auguste	(Argentina) Gabriel Reca (Argentina) Sebastián Nerone		20th
27	29 July 2000	(Spain) Open Opel Padel Tour Mallorca	Open	(Argentina) Hernán Auguste	(Argentina) Fernando Belasteguín (Argentina) Guillermo Demianiuk		21st
28	5 August 2000	(Spain) Open Altea Hills	Open	(Argentina) Hernán Auguste	(Argentina) Gabriel Reca (Argentina) Sebastián Nerone		22nd
29	13 August 2000	(Spain) I Torre Bellver International Champiosnhip	International Championship	(Argentina) Hernán Auguste	(Brazil) Marcelo Jardim (Argentina) Roberto Gattiker		23rd
30	17 August 2000	(Spain) I Andalusia International Champiosnhip	International Championship	(Argentina) Hernán Auguste	(Argentina) Gabriel Reca (Argentina) Sebastián Nerone		24th
31	24 September 2000	(Spain) VII Spanish International Championship	International Championship	(Argentina) Hernán Auguste	(Argentina) Fernando Belasteguín (Argentina) Guillermo Demianiuk		25th
32	1 October 2000	(Spain) V Eudaski International Championship	International Championship	(Argentina) Hernán Auguste	(Argentina) Gabriel Reca (Argentina) Sebastián Nerone		
33	22 October 2000	(Spain) Ciudad de Badajoz	National Tournaments	(Argentina) Hernán Auguste	(Spain) José María Montes (Argentina) Mariano Lasaigues		26th
34	12 November 2000	(Spain) I Copa Federacion	National Tournaments	(Spain) José María Montes	(Spain) Raul Arias (Spain) Willy Lahoz		27th
35	22 April 2001	(Spain) Opel Padel Tour Sevilla	National Championship	(Argentina) Hernán Auguste	(Argentina) Gabriel Reca (Argentina) Sebastián Nerone		28th
36	17 June 2001	(Spain) Spanish National Championship	National Championship	(Spain) Alberto Rodríguez	(Spain) Raul Arias (Spain) Willy Lahoz		29th
38	24 June 2001	(Spain) II Fundacion Tierras Del Sur International Champiosnhip	International Championship	(Argentina) Hernán Auguste	(Spain) Fernando Belasteguín (Spain) Pablo Semprún		30th
39	5 August 2001	(Spain) III Open Altea Hills	Open	(Argentina) Hernán Auguste	(Spain) Fernando Belasteguín (Spain) Pablo Semprún		31st
40	9 August 2001	(Spain) Open Credit Suisse	Open	(Argentina) Hernán Auguste	(Spain) Fernando Belasteguín (Spain) Pablo Semprún		32nd
41	13 August 2001	(Spain) II Torre Bellver International Champiosnhip Champiosnhip	International Championship	(Argentina) Hernán Auguste	(Spain) Fernando Belasteguín (Spain) Pablo Semprún		
42	7 October 2001	(Spain) III Catalunya International Championship	International Championship	(Argentina) Hernán Auguste	(Argentina) Gabriel Reca (Argentina) Sebastián Nerone		33rd
43	14 October 2001	(Spain) II Ciudad de Badajoz Open	Open	(Argentina) Hernán Auguste	(Spain) Fernando Belasteguín (Spain) Pablo Semprún		
44	21 October 2001	(Spain) VI Eudaski International Championship	International Championship	(Argentina) Hernán Auguste	(Argentina) Gabriel Reca (Argentina) Sebastián Nerone		34th
45	23 December 2001	(Spain) II Federation Cup	National Championship	(Spain) Alberto Rodríguez	(Spain) José María Montes (Spain) Pablo Semprún		
46	21 April 2002	(Spain) Opel Padel Tour Bilbao	Open	(Spain) Fernando Belasteguín	(Spain) Willy Lahoz (Argentina) Roby Gattiker	6–4 / 6–0	35th
47	19 May 2002	(Spain) Opel Padel Tour Valladolid	Open	(Spain) Fernando Belasteguín	(Spain) Pablo Semprún (Argentina) Hernán Auguste	6–2 / 5–7 / 4–6	—
48	14 July 2002	(Spain) III San Sebastián Open	Open	(Spain) Fernando Belasteguín	(Spain) Pablo Semprún (Argentina) Hernán Auguste	6–0 / 6–4	36th
49	3 August 2002	(Spain) IV Open Altea Hills	Open	(Spain) Fernando Belasteguín	(Spain) Willy Lahoz (Argentina) Roby Gattiker	6–2 / 6–3	37th
50	8 August 2002	(Spain) Sotogrande Open	Open	(Spain) Fernando Belasteguín	(Spain) Willy Lahoz (Argentina) Roby Gattiker	6–2/ 4–6 / 6–2	38th
51	13 August 2002	(Spain) III Torre Bellver International	International	(Spain) Fernando Belasteguín	(Spain) Willy Lahoz (Argentina) Roby Gattiker	6–1 / 6–0	39th
52	22 August 2002	(Spain) Sotogrande International	International	(Spain) Fernando Belasteguín	(Argentina) Gaby Reca (Argentina) Seba Nerone	4–6 / 6–7	—
53	27 August 2002	(Spain) Opel Padel Tour Vista Hermosa	International	(Spain) Fernando Belasteguín	(Argentina) Gaby Reca (Argentina) Seba Nerone	6–2 / 4–6 / 6–4	40th
54	8 September 2002	(Spain) II Bank of Santander Open	Open	(Spain) Fernando Belasteguín	(Argentina) Lasaigues (Spain) Piñón	6–2 / 6–0	41st
55	15 September 2002	(Spain) Madrid International	International	(Spain) Fernando Belasteguín	(Spain) Pablo Semprún (Argentina) Hernán Auguste	6–3 / 6–1	42nd
56	29 September 2002	(Spain) III Badajoz Open	Open	(Spain) Fernando Belasteguín	(Spain) Pablo Semprún (Argentina) Hernán Auguste	4–6 / 6–7	—
57	6 October 2002	(Spain) IV Catalunya International	International	(Spain) Fernando Belasteguín	(Argentina) Gaby Reca (Argentina) Seba Nerone	6–3 / 6–3	43rd
58	20 October 2002	(Spain) VII Euskadi International	International	(Spain) Fernando Belasteguín	(Argentina) Gaby Reca (Argentina) Seba Nerone	5–7 / 6–3 / 6–4	44th
59	27 October 2002	(Spain) Opel Padel Tour Seville	International	(Spain) Fernando Belasteguín	(Argentina) Cristián Gutiérrez (Argentina) Rovaletti	5–7 / 6–3 / 6–4	45th
60	1 December 2002	(Mexico) World Doubles Championship	World	(Spain) Fernando Belasteguín	(Argentina) Gaby Reca (Argentina) Seba Nerone	6–7 / 7–5 / 6–4	46th
61	4 May 2003	(Spain) Ciudad de Melilla International	International	(Spain) Fernando Belasteguín	(Argentina) Roby Gattiker (Argentina) Cristián Gutiérrez	3–6 / 6–3 / 7–6	47th
62	11 May 2003	(Spain) Opel Padel Tour Valladolid	Open International	(Spain) Fernando Belasteguín	(Argentina) Gaby Reca (Argentina) Seba Nerone	6–3 / 2–0/ w.o.	48th
63	22 June 2003	(Spain) Opel Padel Tour Bilbao	Open International	(Spain) Fernando Belasteguín	(Argentina) Hernán Auguste (Argentina) Lasaigues	6–3 / 6–2	49th
64	11 August 2003	(Spain) IV Torre Bellver International	International	(Spain) Fernando Belasteguín	(Argentina) Roby Gattiker (Argentina) Cristián Gutiérrez	6–4 / 5–7 / 6–4	50th
65	16 August 2003	(Spain) Marbella	International	(Spain) Fernando Belasteguín	(Argentina) Roby Gattiker (Argentina) Cristián Gutiérrez	6–1 / 6–4	51st
66	14 September 2003	(Spain) Madrid International	International	(Spain) Fernando Belasteguín	(Argentina) Gaby Reca (Argentina) Seba Nerone	6–3 / 3–6 / 6–1	52nd
67	28 September 2003	(Spain) VIII Euskadi International	International	(Spain) Fernando Belasteguín	(Argentina) Gaby Reca (Argentina) Seba Nerone	6–3 / 6–2	—
68	26 October 2003	(Spain) Opel Padel Tour Seville	International	(Spain) Fernando Belasteguín	(Argentina) Gaby Reca (Argentina) Seba Nerone	shared	53rd
69	25 April 2004	(Spain) Opel Padel Tour Bilbao	Open International	(Spain) Fernando Belasteguín	(Argentina) Cristián Gutiérrez (Argentina) Hernán Auguste	3–6 / 6–1 / 6–3	54th
70	2 May 2004	(Spain) II Melilla International	International	(Spain) Fernando Belasteguín	(Argentina) Cristián Gutiérrez (Argentina) Hernán Auguste	6–4 / 6–3	55th
71	9 May 2004	(Spain) Opel Padel Tour Seville	Open International	(Spain) Fernando Belasteguín	(Argentina) Cristián Gutiérrez (Argentina) Hernán Auguste	6–1 / 6–2	56th
72	13 June 2004	(Spain) Opel Padel Tour Valladolid	Open Internacional	(Spain) Fernando Belasteguín	(Argentina) Cristián Gutiérrez (Argentina) Hernán Auguste	3–6/ 6–3 / 6–1	57th
73	20 June 2004	(Spain) VI Catalunya International	International	(Spain) Fernando Belasteguín	(Argentina) Cristián Gutiérrez (Argentina) Hernán Auguste	6–2 / 6–1	58th
74	4 July 2004	(Spain) Cantabria Open Challenger		(Spain) Fernando Belasteguín	(Argentina) Gaby Reca (Argentina) Seba Nerone		59th
75	9 August 2004	(Spain) Torres Bellver International	International	(Spain) Fernando Belasteguín	(Argentina) Cristián Gutiérrez (Argentina) Hernán Auguste	3–6 / 4–6	—
76	17 August 2004	(Spain) I Higuerón International	International	(Spain) Fernando Belasteguín	(Spain) Willy Lahoz (Brazil) Marcelo Jardim	7–6 / 5–7 / 2–6	—
77	22 August 2004	(Spain) V Andalucia International	International	(Spain) Fernando Belasteguín	(Argentina) Matí Díaz (Argentina) Malacalza	6–3 / 6–4	60th
78	26 August 2004	(Spain) Opel Padel Tour Vista Hermosa	Open International	(Spain) Fernando Belasteguín	(Argentina) Gaby Reca (Argentina) Seba Nerone	7–5 / 6–4	61st
79	12 September 2004	(Spain) XI Madrid International	International	(Spain) Fernando Belasteguín	(Argentina) Gaby Reca (Argentina) Seba Nerone	6–4 / 7–6	62nd
80	3 October 2004	(Spain) Seville International	International	(Spain) Fernando Belasteguín	(Argentina) Gaby Reca (Argentina) Seba Nerone	6–4 / 6–3	63rd
81	10 October 2004	(Spain) Euskadi International	International	(Spain) Fernando Belasteguín	(Argentina) Gaby Reca (Argentina) Seba Nerone	6–7 / 6–7	—
82	24 October 2004	(Spain) Master Caja de Madrid	Master	(Spain) Fernando Belasteguín	(Argentina) Cristián Gutiérrez (Argentina) Hernán Auguste	6–3 / 6–0	64th
83	21 November 2004	(Argentina) World Doubles Championship	World	(Spain) Fernando Belasteguín	(Argentina) Gaby Reca (Argentina) Seba Nerone	4–6 / 6–1 / 6–4	65th
84	10 April 2005	(Spain) VII Catalonia Open	International	(Spain) Fernando Belasteguín	(Spain) Willy Lahoz (Brazil) Marcelo Jardim	6–3 / 7–6	66th
85	22 May 2005	(Spain) Opel Padel Tour Bilbao	Open	(Spain) Fernando Belasteguín	(Argentina) Gaby Reca (Argentina) Seba Nerone	7–5 / 6–2	67th
86	19 June 2005	(Spain) Valencia	International	(Spain) Fernando Belasteguín	(Argentina) Cristián Gutiérrez (Argentina) Hernán Auguste	W.O.	68th
87	25 June 2005	(Portugal) Lisbon	International	(Spain) Fernando Belasteguín	(Spain) Willy Lahoz (Brazil) Marcelo Jardim	6–7/ 6–0 / 6–3	69th
88	3 July 2005	(Spain) III Córdoba Open	International	(Spain) Fernando Belasteguín	(Argentina) Cristián Gutiérrez (Argentina) Hernán Auguste	6–3 / 6–2	70th
89	10 July 2005	(Spain) International Master Caja de Madrid	Master	(Spain) Fernando Belasteguín	(Spain) Willy Lahoz (Brazil) Marcelo Jardim	6–1 / 5–7 / 6–0	71st
90	7 August 2005	(Spain) Higuerón International	International	(Spain) Fernando Belasteguín	(Argentina) Cristián Gutiérrez (Argentina) Hernán Auguste	3–6 / 6–3 / 6–4	72nd
91	16 August 2005	(Spain) VI Torre Bellver	International	(Spain) Fernando Belasteguín	(Argentina) Gaby Reca (Argentina) Seba Nerone	2–6 / 7–5 / 6–1	73rd
92	21 August 2005	(Spain) V Andalusia Open	International	(Spain) Fernando Belasteguín	(Argentina) Gaby Reca (Argentina) Seba Nerone	3–6 / 2–6	—
93	4 September 2005	(Spain) I Islas Baleares Master	Masters	(Spain) Fernando Belasteguín	(Argentina) Cristián Gutiérrez (Argentina) Hernán Auguste	7–5 / 6–4	74th
94	25 September 2005	(Spain) VI Badajoz International	International	(Spain) Fernando Belasteguín	(Argentina) Gaby Reca (Argentina) Seba Nerone	6–2 / 6–4	75th
95	2 October 2005	(Spain) X Euskadi International	International	(Spain) Fernando Belasteguín	(Argentina) Gaby Reca (Argentina) Seba Nerone	7–5 / 6–0	76th

=== Padel Pro Tour (2006–2012) ===
Win Draw Loss

==== Finals ====
N.º	Year	Tournament	Category	Partner	Opponents in the final	Result	Career Title No.
96	14 May 2006	(Spain) Córdoba	International	(Argentina) Fernando Belasteguín	(Argentina) Sebastián Nerone (Argentina) Gabriel Reca	6–2 / 6–1	77th
97	4 June 2006	(Spain) Majadahonda	International	(Argentina) Fernando Belasteguín	(Argentina) Sebastián Nerone (Argentina) Gabriel Reca	6–0 / 6–0	78th
98	10 June 2006	(Spain) Valencia	International	(Argentina) Fernando Belasteguín	(Argentina) Sebastián Nerone (Argentina) Gabriel Reca	6–4 / 6–3	79th
99	25 June 2006	(Spain) FEP Madrid	Open	(Argentina) Fernando Belasteguín	(Argentina) Sebastián Nerone (Brazil) Marcello Jardim	6–1 / 6–4	80th
100	2 July 2006	(Spain) Alicante	International	(Argentina) Fernando Belasteguín	(Argentina) Sebastián Nerone (Argentina) Gabriel Reca	6–3 / 6–4	81st
101	9 July 2006	(Spain) Valladolid	International	(Argentina) Fernando Belasteguín	(Argentina) Sebastián Nerone (Argentina) Gabriel Reca	6–3 / 6–3	82nd
102	11 August 2006	(Spain) Marbella	International	(Argentina) Fernando Belasteguín	(Spain) Raúl Arias (Argentina) Ramiro Nanni	6–3 / 6–4	83rd
103	15 August 2006	(Spain) Oropesa del Mar	International	(Argentina) Fernando Belasteguín	(Argentina) Sebastián Nerone (Argentina) Gabriel Reca	7–6^{(9)} / 6–4	84th
104	20 August 2006	(Spain) Reserva del Higuerón	International	(Argentina) Fernando Belasteguín	(Argentina) Sebastián Nerone (Argentina) Gabriel Reca	6–4 / 6–0	85th
105	25 August 2006	(Spain) El Puerto de Santa María	International	(Argentina) Fernando Belasteguín	(Argentina) Sebastián Nerone (Argentina) Gabriel Reca	6–3 / 6–2	86th
106	3 September 2006	(Spain) Palma de Mallorca	International	(Argentina) Fernando Belasteguín	(Argentina) Sebastián Nerone (Argentina) Gabriel Reca	6–3 / 7–5	87th
107	17 September 2006	(Spain) Mérida	International	(Argentina) Fernando Belasteguín	(Argentina) Roby Gattiker (Brazil) Pablo Lima	6–2 / 6–0	88th
108	24 September 2006	(Spain) Madrid	International	(Argentina) Fernando Belasteguín	(Argentina) Sebastián Nerone (Argentina) Gabriel Reca	6–4 / 4–6 / 6–1	89th
109	1 October 2006	(Spain) Zaragoza	International	(Argentina) Fernando Belasteguín	(Argentina) Sebastián Nerone (Argentina) Gabriel Reca	7–6^{(?)} / 6–3	90th
110	8 October 2006	(Spain) Guecho	International	(Argentina) Fernando Belasteguín	(Argentina) Mati Díaz (Spain) Chema Montes	6–3 / 6–4	91st
111	5 November 2006	(Spain) Las Palmas	International	(Argentina) Fernando Belasteguín	(Argentina) Roby Gattiker (Brazil) Pablo Lima	6–1 / 6–2	92nd
112	3 December 2006	(Spain) Masters PPT Madrid	Master	(Argentina) Fernando Belasteguín	(Argentina) Sebastián Nerone (Argentina) Gabriel Reca	6–3 / 6–2	93rd
113	5 May 2007	(Spain) Córdoba	International	(Argentina) Fernando Belasteguín	(Argentina) Sebastián Nerone (Argentina) Cristian Gutiérrez	6–1 / 6–3	94th
114	20 May 2007	(Spain) Barcelona	International	(Argentina) Fernando Belasteguín	(Argentina) Sebastián Nerone (Argentina) Cristian Gutiérrez	6–3 / 7–5	95th
115	2 June 2007	(Spain) Madrid	International	(Argentina) Fernando Belasteguín	(Argentina) Miguel Lamperti (Argentina) Mariano Lasaigues	6–3 / 6–2	96th
116	17 June 2007	(Spain) Valencia	International	(Argentina) Fernando Belasteguín	(Argentina) Sebastián Nerone (Argentina) Cristian Gutiérrez	6–3 / 2–6 / 6–4	97th
117	8 July 2007	(Spain) Vitoria-Gasteiz	International	(Argentina) Fernando Belasteguín	(Argentina) Sebastián Nerone (Argentina) Cristian Gutiérrez	7–6^{(?)} / 6–4	98th
118	28 July 2007	(Spain) Madrid II	International	(Argentina) Fernando Belasteguín	(Argentina) Sebastián Nerone (Argentina) Cristian Gutiérrez	6–4 / 7–6^{(?)}	99th
119	5 August 2007	(Spain) Oropesa del Mar	International	(Argentina) Fernando Belasteguín	(Argentina) Sebastián Nerone (Argentina) Cristian Gutiérrez	6–2 / 5–2 / W.O.	100th
120	11 August 2007	(Spain) Marbella	International	(Argentina) Fernando Belasteguín	(Argentina) Sebastián Nerone* (Argentina) Cristian Gutiérrez	*W.O.	101st
121	19 August 2007	(Spain) Reserva del Higuerón	International	(Argentina) Fernando Belasteguín	(Argentina) Gabriel Reca (Argentina) Hernán Auguste	6–4 / 6–2	102nd
122	24 August 2007	(Spain) Puerto de Santa María	International	(Argentina) Fernando Belasteguín	(Argentina) Gabriel Reca (Argentina) Hernán Auguste	7–5 / 6–4	103rd
123	2 September 2007	(Spain) Palma de Mallorca	International	(Argentina) Fernando Belasteguín	(Argentina) Gabriel Reca (Argentina) Hernán Auguste	6–3 / 5–7 / 6–3	104th
124	16 September 2007	(Spain) Mérida	International	(Argentina) Fernando Belasteguín	(Argentina) Miguel Lamperti (Argentina) Matías Díaz	6–1 / 6–2	105th
125	23 September 2007	(Spain) San Sebastián	International	(Argentina) Fernando Belasteguín	(Argentina) Sebastián Nerone (Argentina) Cristian Gutiérrez	7–5 / 6–1	106th
126	30 September 2007	(Spain) Zaragoza	International	(Argentina) Fernando Belasteguín	(Argentina) Miguel Lamperti (Argentina) Matías Díaz	6–3 / 6–3	107th
127	7 October 2007	(Spain) Bilbao	International	(Argentina) Fernando Belasteguín	(Argentina) Sebastián Nerone (Argentina) Cristian Gutiérrez	6–2 / 7–5	108th
128	28 October 2007	(Spain) Las Palmas	International	(Argentina) Fernando Belasteguín	(Argentina) Sebastián Nerone (Argentina) Cristian Gutiérrez	6–3 / 6–1	109th
129	1 November 2007	(Spain) Alicante	International	(Argentina) Fernando Belasteguín	(Argentina) Gabriel Reca (Argentina) Hernán Auguste		110th
130	16 December 2007	(Spain) Master Final PPT Madrid	Master Final	(Argentina) Fernando Belasteguín	(Argentina) Gabriel Reca (Argentina) Hernán Auguste	6–2 / 7–6^{(?)}	111st
131	13 April 2008	(Spain) Ciudad Real	International	(Argentina) Fernando Belasteguín	(Argentina) Sebastián Nerone (Argentina) Cristian Gutiérrez	6–4 / 6–4	112nd
132	27 April 2008	(Spain) Granada	International	(Argentina) Fernando Belasteguín	(Argentina) Miguel Lamperti (Argentina) Matías Díaz	5–7 / 6–3 / 6–3	113rd
133	12 May 2008	(Spain) Santander	International	(Argentina) Fernando Belasteguín	(Argentina) Gabriel Reca (Argentina) Hernán Auguste	6–1 / 3–6 / 7–6^{(?)}	114th
134	19 May 2008	(Spain) Barcelona	International	(Argentina) Fernando Belasteguín	(Spain) Guillermo Lahoz (Argentina) Gastón Malacalza	6–3 / 6–2	115th
135	31 May 2008	(Spain) Majadahonda	International	(Argentina) Fernando Belasteguín	(Argentina) Sebastián Nerone (Argentina) Cristian Gutiérrez	6–3 / 6–4	116th
136	15 June 2008	(Spain) Valencia	International	(Argentina) Fernando Belasteguín	(Argentina) Gabriel Reca (Argentina) Hernán Auguste	5–7 / 6–1 / 5–7	—
137	29 June 2008	(Spain) La Rioja	International	(Argentina) Fernando Belasteguín	(Spain) Guillermo Lahoz (Argentina) Gastón Malacalza	6–2 / 7–5	117th
138	6 July 2008	(Spain) Valladolid	International	(Argentina) Fernando Belasteguín	(Argentina) Maxi Grabiel (Argentina) Agustín Silingo	6–3 / 4–6 / 4–6	—
139	13 July 2008	(Spain) Vitoria-Gasteiz	International	(Argentina) Fernando Belasteguín	(Argentina) Sebastián Nerone (Argentina) Cristian Gutiérrez	6–3 / 6–4	118th
140	19 July 2008	(Spain) Madrid	International	(Argentina) Fernando Belasteguín	(Argentina) Sebastián Nerone (Argentina) Cristian Gutiérrez	6–2 / 6–7^{(?)} / 6–1	119th
141	10 August 2008	(Spain) Marbella	International	(Argentina) Fernando Belasteguín	(Argentina) Sebastián Nerone (Argentina) Cristian Gutiérrez	6–3 / 6–3	120th
142	17 August 2008	(Spain) Reserva del Higuerón	International	(Argentina) Fernando Belasteguín	(Argentina) Miguel Lamperti (Argentina) Matías Díaz	6–1 / 6–4	121st
143	23 August 2008	(Spain) Benicasim	International	(Argentina) Fernando Belasteguín	(Argentina) Sebastián Nerone (Argentina) Cristian Gutiérrez	7–5 / 6–3	122nd
144	7 September 2008	(Spain) Islas Baleares	International	(Argentina) Fernando Belasteguín	(Argentina) Sebastián Nerone (Argentina) Cristian Gutiérrez	6–1 / 3–6 / 6–3	123rd
145	14 September 2008	(Spain) Mérida	International	(Argentina) Fernando Belasteguín	(Argentina) Miguel Lamperti (Argentina) Matías Díaz	6–3 / 6–3	124th
146	21 September 2008	(Spain) San Sebastián	International	(Argentina) Fernando Belasteguín	(Argentina) Sebastián Nerone (Argentina) Cristian Gutiérrez	6–4 / 6–3	125th
147	28 September 2008	(Spain) Zaragoza	International	(Argentina) Fernando Belasteguín	(Argentina) Sebastián Nerone (Argentina) Cristian Gutiérrez	6–1 / 6–3	126th
148	5 October 2008	(Spain) Bilbao	International	(Argentina) Fernando Belasteguín	(Argentina) Sebastián Nerone (Argentina) Cristian Gutiérrez	6–7^{(?)} / 6–4 / 6–4	127th
149	31 May 2009	(Spain) Madrid	International	(Argentina) Fernando Belasteguín	(Spain) Juani Mieres (Brazil) Pablo Lima	6–4 / 6–0	—
150	14 June 2009	(Spain) Barcelona	Internacional	(Argentina) Fernando Belasteguín	(Argentina) Sebastián Nerone (Argentina) Cristian Gutiérrez	6–4 / 6–2	128th
151	28 June 2009	(Spain) Córdoba	International	(Argentina) Fernando Belasteguín	(Argentina) Miguel Lamperti (Argentina) Matías Díaz	7–6^{(4)} / 7–5	129th
152	5 July 2009	(Spain) Valladolid	International	(Argentina) Fernando Belasteguín	(Argentina) Gabriel Reca (Argentina) Hernán Auguste	6–2 / 7–5	130th
153	12 July 2009	(Spain) Alicante	International	(Argentina) Fernando Belasteguín	(Spain) Juani Mieres (Brazil) Pablo Lima	6–2 / 7–6	131st
154	2 August 2009	(Spain) Marbella	International	(Argentina) Fernando Belasteguín	(Argentina) Cristian Gutiérrez (Argentina) Sebastián Nerone	6–3 / 6–4	132nd
155	9 August 2009	(Spain) Fuengirola	International	(Argentina) Fernando Belasteguín	(Argentina) Cristian Gutiérrez (Argentina) Sebastián Nerone	5–7 / 6–4 / 4–6	—
156	20 September 2009	(Spain) San Sebastián	International	(Argentina) Fernando Belasteguín	(Spain) Juani Mieres (Brazil) Pablo Lima	6–2 / 6–2	133rd
157	27 September 2009	(Spain) Zaragoza	International	(Argentina) Fernando Belasteguín	(Argentina) Cristian Gutiérrez (Argentina) Sebastián Nerone	6–1 / 6–3	134th
158	4 October 2009	(Spain) Bilbao	International	(Argentina) Fernando Belasteguín	(Argentina) Sebastián Nerone (Argentina) Cristian Gutiérrez	4–6 / 6–4 / 6–2	135th
159	18 October 2009	(Spain) Valencia	International	(Argentina) Fernando Belasteguín	(Argentina) Sebastián Nerone (Argentina) Cristian Gutiérrez	6–2 / 6–1	136th
160	25 October 2009	(Spain) Ciudad Real	International	(Argentina) Fernando Belasteguín	(Argentina) Sebastián Nerone (Argentina) Cristian Gutiérrez	7–6^{(5)} / 7–5	137th
161	28 November 2009	(Spain) Salamanca	International	(Argentina) Fernando Belasteguín	(Spain) Juani Mieres (Brazil) Pablo Lima	4–6 / 5–7	—
162	13 December 2009	(Spain) Masters PPT Madrid	Madrid	(Argentina) Fernando Belasteguín	(Spain) Juani Mieres (Brazil) Pablo Lima	6–4 / 6–2	138th
163	16 May 2010	(Spain) San Sebastián	International	(Argentina) Fernando Belasteguín	(Argentina) Miguel Lamperti (Spain) Matías Díaz	6–3 / 6–1	139th
164	5 June 2010	(Spain) Barcelona	International	(Argentina) Fernando Belasteguín	(Argentina) Gabriel Reca (Argentina) Hernán Auguste	6–2 / 6–3	140th
165	11 July 2010	(Spain) Alicante	International	(Argentina) Fernando Belasteguín	(Argentina) Miguel Lamperti (Spain) Matías Díaz	6–3 / W.O.	141st
166	18 July 2010	(Spain) Madrid	International	(Argentina) Fernando Belasteguín	(Spain) Juani Mieres (Brazil) Pablo Lima	7–5 / 6–2	142nd
167	25 July 2010	(Spain) Benicasim	International	(Argentina) Fernando Belasteguín	(Spain) Juani Mieres (Brazil) Pablo Lima	6–3 / 7–5	143rd
168	1 August 2010	(Spain) Marbella	International	(Argentina) Fernando Belasteguín	(Argentina) Miguel Lamperti (Spain) Matías Díaz	6–2 / 6–3	144th
169	8 August 2010	(Spain) Fuengirola	International	(Argentina) Fernando Belasteguín	(Spain) Juani Mieres (Brazil) Pablo Lima	6–3 / 6–4	145th
170	19 September 2010	(Spain) Sevilla	International	(Argentina) Fernando Belasteguín	(Brazil) Pablo Lima (Spain) Juani Mieres	2–6 / 3–6	—
171	26 September 2010	(Spain) Navarra	International	(Argentina) Fernando Belasteguín	(Spain) Juani Mieres (Brazil) Pablo Lima	6–4 / 6–7 / 6–1	146th
172	3 October 2010	(Spain) Bilbao	International	(Argentina) Fernando Belasteguín	(Spain) Juani Mieres (Brazil) Pablo Lima	6–3 / 6–4	147th
173	24 October 2010	(Spain) Murcia	International	(Argentina) Fernando Belasteguín	(Spain) Juani Mieres (Brazil) Pablo Lima	3–6 / 6–4 / 6–4	148th
174	7 November 2010	(Spain) Logroño	International	(Argentina) Fernando Belasteguín	(Spain) Juani Mieres (Brazil) Pablo Lima	7–6 / 6–7 / 6–3	149th
175	19 December 2010	(Spain) Masters PPT Madrid	Master	(Argentina) Fernando Belasteguín	(Spain) Juani Mieres (Brazil) Pablo Lima	6–3 / 6–4	150th
176	3 April 2011	(Argentina) Mendoza	International	(Argentina) Fernando Belasteguín	(Brazil) Pablo Lima (Spain) Juani Mieres	2–6 / 6–7	—
177	29 May 2011	(Spain) Madrid	International	(Argentina) Fernando Belasteguín	(Argentina) Miguel Lamperti (Argentina) Cristian Gutiérrez	6–3 / 6–3	151st
178	5 June 2011	(Spain) Barcelona	International	(Argentina) Fernando Belasteguín	(Spain) Juani Mieres (Brazil) Pablo Lima	6–4 / 6–3	152nd
179	3 July 2011	(Spain) Valladolid	International	(Argentina) Fernando Belasteguín	(Argentina) Agustín Gómez Silingo (Argentina) Gabriel Reca	6–2 / 6–2	153rd
180	10 July 2011	(Spain) Alicante	International	(Argentina) Fernando Belasteguín	(Spain) Juani Mieres (Brazil) Pablo Lima	6–1 / 6–1	154th
181	24 July 2011	(Spain) Benicasim	International	(Argentina) Fernando Belasteguín	(Argentina) Miguel Lamperti (Argentina) Cristian Gutiérrez	6–4 / 6–4	155th
182	31 July 2011	(Spain) Marbella	International	(Argentina) Fernando Belasteguín	(Spain) Juani Mieres (Brazil) Pablo Lima	4–6 / 7–6 / 6–3	156th
183	14 August 2011	(Spain) Gijón	International	(Argentina) Fernando Belasteguín	(Argentina) Matías Díaz (Argentina) Hernán Auguste	6–1 / 6–4	157th
184	25 September 2011	(Spain) Sevilla	International	(Argentina) Fernando Belasteguín	(Argentina) Miguel Lamperti (Argentina) Cristian Gutiérrez	6–3 / 6–4	158th
185	2 October 2011	(Spain) Madrid II	International	(Argentina) Fernando Belasteguín	(Spain) Juani Mieres (Brazil) Pablo Lima	6–4 / 7–6	159th
186	9 October 2011	(Spain) Bilbao	International	(Argentina) Fernando Belasteguín	(Spain) Juani Mieres (Brazil) Pablo Lima	6–4 / 6–4	160th
187	6 November 2011	(Spain) Logroño	International	(Argentina) Fernando Belasteguín	(Spain) Juani Mieres (Brazil) Pablo Lima	7–6 / 6–4	161st
188	13 November 2011	(Spain) Vitoria-Gasteiz	International	(Argentina) Fernando Belasteguín	(Spain) Juani Mieres (Brazil) Pablo Lima	7–6 / 7–5	162nd
189	19 February 2012	(Argentina) Mendoza	International	(Argentina) Fernando Belasteguín	(Argentina) Miguel Lamperti (Argentina) Maxi Grabiel	6–3 / 6–3	—
190	26 February 2012	(Argentina) Buenos Aires	International	(Argentina) Fernando Belasteguín	(Spain) Juani Mieres (Brazil) Pablo Lima	6–4 / 6–3	163rd
191	27 May 2012	(Spain) Madrid	International	(Argentina) Fernando Belasteguín	(Argentina) Cristian Gutiérrez (Argentina) Fernando Poggi	7–5 / 6–1	164th
192	10 June 2012	(Spain) Barcelona	International	(Argentina) Fernando Belasteguín	(Spain) Juani Mieres (Brazil) Pablo Lima	6–2 / 6–3	165th
193	17 June 2012	(Spain) Córdoba	International	(Argentina) Fernando Belasteguín	(Spain) Juani Mieres (Brazil) Pablo Lima	6–4 / 7–6	166th
194	1 July 2012	(Spain) Valladolid	International	(Argentina) Fernando Belasteguín	(Spain) Paquito Navarro (Argentina) Adrián Allemandi	6–4 / 6–3	167th
195	5 August 2012	(Spain) Fuengirola	International	(Argentina) Fernando Belasteguín	(Spain) Juani Mieres (Brazil) Pablo Lima	7–5 / 7–6	168th
196	19 August 2012	(Spain) Gijón	International	(Argentina) Fernando Belasteguín	(Spain) Juani Mieres (Brazil) Pablo Lima	6–4 / 6–7 / 3–6	—
197	2 September 2012	(Spain) Palma de Mallorca	International	(Argentina) Fernando Belasteguín	(Spain) Juani Mieres (Brazil) Pablo Lima	6–3 / 6–4	169th
198	9 September 2012	(Spain) Ibiza	International	(Argentina) Fernando Belasteguín	(Spain) Juani Mieres (Brazil) Pablo Lima	2–6 / 6–3 / 6–4	170th
199	30 September 2012	(Spain) Madrid	International	(Argentina) Fernando Belasteguín	(Argentina) Miguel Lamperti (Argentina) Maxi Grabiel	7–5 / 6–3	171st

=== World Padel Tour (2013–2023) ===
Win Draw Loss

==== Finals ====
N.º	Year	Tournament	Category	Partner	Opponents in the final	Result	Career Title No.
200	14 April 2013	(Spain) Murcia	Open	(Argentina) Fernando Belasteguín	(Spain) Juani Mieres (Brazil) Pablo Lima	6–3 / 6–7 / 6–3	172nd
201	12 May 2013	(Spain) Seville	Open	(Argentina) Fernando Belasteguín	(Spain) Juani Mieres (Brazil) Pablo Lima	4–6 / 7–6 / 6–4 / 6–3	173rd
202	26 May 2013	(Spain) Cáceres	Open	(Argentina) Fernando Belasteguín	(Argentina) Maxi Sánchez (Argentina) Sanyo Gutiérrez	6–3 / 6–2 / 6–2	174th
203	9 June 2013	(Spain) Barcelona	Open	(Argentina) Fernando Belasteguín	(Spain) Juani Mieres (Brazil) Pablo Lima	6–1 / 6–4 / 4–6 / 6–3	175th
204	23 June 2013	(Spain) Madrid	Open	(Argentina) Fernando Belasteguín	(Brazil) Pablo Lima (Spain) Juani Mieres	7–6 / 0–6 / 6–7 / 4–6	
205	4 August 2013	(Spain) Málaga	Open	(Argentina) Fernando Belasteguín	(Spain) Juani Mieres (Brazil) Pablo Lima	6–4 / 6–4 / 6–4	176th
206	18 August 2013	(Spain) Benicasim	Open	(Argentina) Fernando Belasteguín	(Spain) Juani Mieres (Brazil) Pablo Lima	7–5 / 6–1 / 4–6 / 6–4	177th
207	1 September 2013	(Spain) Alicante	Open	(Argentina) Fernando Belasteguín	(Argentina) Matías Díaz (Argentina) Cristian Gutiérrez	6–2 / 6–4 / 6–4	178th
208	15 September 2013	(Spain) Bilbao	Open	(Argentina) Fernando Belasteguín	(Spain) Juani Mieres (Brazil) Pablo Lima	4–6 / 6–3 / 7–5 / 6–2	179th
209	29 September 2013	(Spain) Granada	Open	(Argentina) Fernando Belasteguín	(Spain) Juani Mieres (Brazil) Pablo Lima	7–6 / 6–4 / 6–3	180th
210	13 October 2013	(Portugal) Lisbon	Open	(Argentina) Fernando Belasteguín	(Spain) Juani Mieres (Brazil) Pablo Lima	6–3 / 2–6 / 6–3 / 6–4	181st
211	22 December 2013	(Spain) Madrid	Master Final	(Argentina) Fernando Belasteguín	(Argentina) Sanyo Gutiérrez (Argentina) Maxi Sánchez	7–6 / 1–6 / 6–7 / W.O.	
212	25 May 2014	(Spain) Barcelona	Open	(Argentina) Fernando Belasteguín	(Spain) Juani Mieres (Brazil) Pablo Lima	6–3 / 4–6 / 6–2 / 6–3	182nd
213	15 June 2014	(Spain) Badajoz	Open	(Argentina) Fernando Belasteguín	(Spain) Juani Mieres (Brazil) Pablo Lima	6–4 / 6–3 / 6–2	183rd
214	29 June 2014	(Spain) Córdoba	Open	(Argentina) Fernando Belasteguín	(Spain) Juani Mieres (Brazil) Pablo Lima	6–2 / 6–7 / 6–3 / 6–3	184th
215	13 July 2014	(Spain) Castellón	Open	(Argentina) Fernando Belasteguín	(Brazil) Pablo Lima (Spain) Juani Mieres	6–2 / 3–6 / 3–6 / 3–6	
216	3 August 2014	(Spain) Marbella	Open	(Argentina) Fernando Belasteguín	(Spain) Paquito Navarro (Argentina) Adrián Allemandi	6–1 / 6–7 / 6–3 / 6–4	185th
217	24 August 2014	(Spain) Alicante	Open	(Argentina) Fernando Belasteguín	(Brazil) Pablo Lima (Spain) Juani Mieres	6–2 / 5–7 / 6–7 / 6–4 / 5–7	
218	7 September 2014	(Spain) Alcobendas	Open	(Argentina) Fernando Belasteguín	(Argentina) Cristian Gutiérrez (Spain) Matías Díaz	6–4 / 4–6 / 5–7 / 6–3 / 6–4	186th
219	21 September 2014	(Spain) Seville	Open	(Argentina) Fernando Belasteguín	(Argentina) Maxi Sánchez (Argentina) Sanyo Gutiérrez	6–3 / 6–3 / 6–1	187th
220	5 October 2014	(Portugal) Lisbon	Open	(Argentina) Fernando Belasteguín	(Argentina) Maxi Sánchez (Argentina) Sanyo Gutiérrez	6–4 / 6–4 / 6–1	188th
221	19 October 2014	(Spain) San Cristóbal de La Laguna	Open	(Argentina) Fernando Belasteguín	(Spain) Juani Mieres (Brazil) Pablo Lima	6–4 / 1–6 / 6–2	189th
222	9 November 2014	(Spain) Valencia	Open	(Argentina) Fernando Belasteguín	(Argentina) Maxi Grabiel (Spain) Paquito Navaro	2–6 / 6–3 / 3–6 / 5–7	
223	30 November 2014	(Argentina) Córdoba	Open	(Argentina) Fernando Belasteguín	(Argentina) Maxi Sánchez (Argentina) Sanyo Gutiérrez	6–1 / 5–7 / 6–3	190th
224	21 December 2014	(Spain) Madrid	Master Final	(Argentina) Fernando Belasteguín	(Argentina) Sanyo Gutiérrez (Argentina) Maxi Sánchez	6–7 / 7–5 / 5–7	
225	19 July 2015	(Spain) Mallorca	(Spain) Open	(Argentina) Maxi Sánchez	(Argentina) Fernando Belasteguín (Brazil) Pablo Lima	4–6 / 0–6	
226	2 August 2015	(Spain) Málaga	(Spain) Master	(Argentina) Maxi Sánchez	(Argentina) Fernando Belasteguín (Brazil) Pablo Lima	6–7 / 3–6	
227	23 August 2015	(Spain) La Nucía	(Spain) Open	(Argentina) Maxi Sánchez	(Argentina) Fernando Belasteguín (Brazil) Pablo Lima	6–7 / 6–7	
228	18 October 2015	(Spain) Galicia	(Spain) Open	(Argentina) Maxi Sánchez	(Argentina) Fernando Belasteguín (Brazil) Pablo Lima	4–6 / 4–6	
229	18 October 2015	(Spain) Masters Final	(Spain) Masters Final	(Argentina) Maxi Sánchez	(Argentina) Maxi Grabiel y (Argentina) Ramiro Moyano	2–6 / 6–4 / 6–1	191st
230	8 May 2016	(Spain) Barcelona Master	Master	(Argentina) Cristian Gutiérrez	(Argentina) Fernando Belasteguín (Brazil) Pablo Lima	2–6 / 3–6	
231	26 June 2016	(Spain) Mallorca	Open	(Argentina) Cristian Gutiérrez	(Argentina) Fernando Belasteguín (Brazil) Pablo Lima	6–7 / WO	
232	6 May 2018	(Spain) Zaragoza	Open	(Spain) Paquito Navarro	(Argentina) Maxi Sánchez (Argentina) Sanyo Gutiérrez	4–6 / 7–6 / 3–6	
233	27 May 2018	(Spain) Jaén	Open	(Spain) Paquito Navarro	(Argentina) Sanyo Gutiérrez (Argentina) Maxi Sánchez	3–6 / 3–6	
234	29 July 2018	(Sweden) Bastad	Open	(Spain) Paquito Navarro	(Argentina) Fernando Belasteguín (Brazil) Pablo Lima	2–6 / 6–3 / 3–6	

=== National Team ===
- 1997 European Pairs Championship - winner with Alberto Rodríguez Piñón
- 1998 European Pairs Championship - winner with José María Montes;
- 1998 World Padel Championship - winner with Raúl Arias;
- 1999 European Pairs Championship - runners-up with José María Montes;
- 2000 World Padel Championship - runners-up with Alberto Rodríguez Piñón

==== Other Titles ====
- 1997 Spanish National Championship - winner with Alberto Rodríguez Piñón;
- 1998 Spanish National Championship - winner with José María Montes;
- 1998 Spanish Mixed Championship - winner with Carolina Navarro:
- 1999 Spanish National Championship - winner with José María Montes;
- 1999 Spanish Mixed Championship - winner with Carolina Navarro;
- 2000 Spanish National Championship - runners-up with José María Montes;
- 2001 Spanish National Championship - winner with Alberto Rodríguez Piñón;
- 2002 Spanish National Championship - winner with Alberto Rodríguez Piñón;
- 2003 Spanish National Championship - runners-up with Alberto Rodríguez Piñón;
- 2004 Spanish National Championship - winner with Raúl Arias;
- 2004 Andalusia Team Championship - winner with Club Sato Sport;
- 2004 Spanish Team Championship - winner with Club Sato Sport;
- 2005 Spanish Team Championship - winner with Club Sato Sport;
- 2020 Spanish National Championship - winner with Paquito Navarro

== Teammates ==
- Ezequiel Lorenzo;
- Leonardo Padovani;
- Alberto Rodríguez Piñón (01/1997 – 12/1997, 1998, 2000);
- José María Montes (01/1998 – 12/1998, 2000);
- Hernán Auguste (01/2000 – 12/2001);
- Fernando Belasteguín (01/2002 – 12/2014);
- Juani Mieres (01/2015 – 06/2015);
- Maxi Sánchez (07/2015 – 12/2015);
- Cristián Gutiérrez (01/2016 – 12/2016);
- Federico Quiles (2016);
- Paquito Navarro (01/2018 – 10/2018);
- Juan Lebrón (10/2018 – 12/2018);
- Agustín Tapia (01/2019 – 08/2019);
- Lucas Campangolo (01/2020 – 12/2020);
- Coki Nieto (01/2021 – 06/2021);
- Pablo Lijó (06/2021 – 12/2021);
- Agustín Gutiérrez (01/2022 – 06/2022);
- Álex Arroyo (06/2022 – 09/2022);
- Miguel Benitez (10/2022 – 12/2022);
- Agustín Gómez Sillingo (01/2023 – 06/2023);
- Jairo Buatista (06/2023 – 09/2023);
- Miguel Lamperti (09/2023 – 11/2023);

== Bibliography ==
- "Evolución y trayectoria de Juan Martín Díaz". street padel.
