= 2014 World Padel Tour =

Padel circuit in 2014

World Padel Tour 2014
Details
- Duration: 19 May – 21 December
- Edition: 2nd
- Tournaments: 16
- Categories: Open (15); Masters Finals (1)

Achievements (singles)
- Most titles: Men's (Argentina) Fernando Belasteguín (Spain) Juan Martín Díaz (9); Women's (Spain) Mapi Sánchez Alayeto (Spain) Majo Sánchez Alayeto (4)
- Most finals: Men's (Argentina) Fernando Belasteguín (Spain) Juan Martín Díaz (13); Women's (shared) (Spain) Mapi Sánchez Alayeto (Spain) Majo Sánchez Alayeto (Spain) Alejandra Salazar (Spain) Icíar Montes (4)

The 2014 World Padel Tour was the second edition of the World Padel Tour, the most prestigious professional padel circuit in the world. In its second edition, Argentinians Fernando Belasteguín and Juan Martín Díaz were crowned number 1 for the thirteenth time, in what was their last year together. In the female division Mapi Sánchez Alayeto and Majo Sánchez Alayeto were crowned number one in WPT for the first time in their carriers.

== Tournaments and results ==
Open Master Final

Tournament	Date	Men's			Women's		
Tournament	Date	Winners	Score	Runners-up	Winners	Score	Runners-up
(Spain) Barcelona Open	19 – 25 May	(Argentina) Fernando Belasteguín (Spain) Juan Martín Díaz	6–3 / 4–6 / 6–2 / 6–3	(Spain) Juani Mieres (Brazil) Pablo Lima	(Spain) Alejandra Salazar (Spain) Icíar Montes	1–6 / 6–3 / 6–3	(Spain) Mapi Sánchez Alayeto (Spain) Majo Sánchez Alayeto
(Spain) Badajoz Open	9 – 15 June	(Argentina) Fernando Belasteguín (Spain) Juan Martín Díaz	6–4 / 6–3 / 6–2	(Spain) Juani Mieres (Brazil) Pablo Lima	(Spain) Mapi Sánchez Alayeto (Spain) Majo Sánchez Alayeto	6–4 / 3–6 / 6–4	(Spain) Alejandra Salazar (Spain) Icíar Montes
(Spain) Córdoba Open	23 – 29 June	(Argentina) Fernando Belasteguín (Spain) Juan Martín Díaz	6–2 / 6–7 / 6–3 / 6–3	(Spain) Juani Mieres (Brazil) Pablo Lima	Not contested		
(Spain) Castellón Open	7 – 13 July	(Spain) Juani Mieres (Brazil) Pablo Lima	2–6 / 6–3 / 6–3 / 6–3	(Argentina) Fernando Belasteguín (Spain) Juan Martín Díaz	Not contested		
(Spain) Málaga Open	21 – 27 July	(Argentina) Maxi Sánchez (Argentina) Sanyo Gutiérrez	4–6 / 6–4 / 6–2 / 6–4	(Spain) Juani Mieres (Brazil) Pablo Lima	(Spain) Mapi Sánchez Alayeto (Spain) Majo Sánchez Alayeto	6–2 / 6–3	(Spain) Elisabeth Amatriaín (Spain) Patricia Llaguno
(Spain) Marbella Open	4 – 10 August	(Argentina) Fernando Belasteguín (Spain) Juan Martín Díaz	6–1 / 6–7 / 6–3 / 6–4	(Argentina) Adrián Allemandi (Spain) Paquito Navarro	(Spain) Mapi Sánchez Alayeto (Spain) Majo Sánchez Alayeto	6–3 / 7–5	(Spain) Elisabeth Amatriaín (Spain) Patricia Llaguno
(Spain) Alicante Open	18 – 24 August	(Spain) Juani Mieres (Brazil) Pablo Lima	2–6 / 7–5 / 7–6 / 4–6 / 7–5	(Argentina) Fernando Belasteguín (Spain) Juan Martín Díaz	(Spain) Elisabeth Amatriaín (Spain) Patricia Llaguno	6–3 / 6–3	(Spain) Alejandra Salazar (Spain) Icíar Montes
(Spain) Alcobendas Open	1 – 7 September	(Argentina) Fernando Belasteguín (Spain) Juan Martín Díaz	6–4 / 4–6 / 5–7 / 6–3 / 6–4	(Argentina) Cristián Gutiérrez (Spain) Matías Díaz	(Spain) Alejandra Salazar (Spain) Icíar Montes	7–6 / 6–2	(Spain) Carolina Navarro (Argentina) Cecilia Reiter
(Spain) Seville Open	15 – 21 September	(Argentina) Fernando Belasteguín (Spain) Juan Martín Díaz	6–3 / 6–3 / 6–1	(Argentina) Maxi Sánchez (Argentina) Sanyo Gutiérrez	(Spain) Alejandra Salazar (Spain) Icíar Montes	6–7 / 7–6 / 6–2	(Spain) Catalina Tenorio (Spain) Marta Marrero
Portugal Open	29 September – 5 October	(Argentina) Fernando Belasteguín (Spain) Juan Martín Díaz	6–4 / 6–4 / 6–1	(Argentina) Maxi Sánchez (Argentina) Sanyo Gutiérrez	Not contested		
(Spain) Canarias Open	13 – 19 October	(Argentina) Fernando Belasteguín (Spain) Juan Martín Díaz	6–4 / 1–6 / 6–2	(Spain) Juani Mieres (Brazil) Pablo Lima	Not contested		
(Spain) Valencia Open	3 – 9 November	(Argentina) Maxi Grabiel (Spain) Paquito Navarro	6–2 / 3–6 / 6–3 / 7–5	(Argentina) Fernando Belasteguín (Spain) Juan Martín Díaz	(Spain) Catalina Tenorio (Spain) Marta Marrero	6–2 / 6–4	(Spain) Lucía Sainz (Spain) Marta Ortega
(Spain) San Fernando Open	17 – 23 November	(Argentina) Maxi Grabiel (Spain) Paquito Navarro	7–5 / 5–7 / 7–5 / 7–6	(Argentina) Maxi Sánchez (Argentina) Sanyo Gutiérrez	Not contested		
Argentina Open	24 – 30 November	(Argentina) Fernando Belasteguín (Spain) Juan Martín Díaz	6–1 / 5–7 / 6–3	(Argentina) Maxi Sánchez (Argentina) Sanyo Gutiérrez	Not contested		
(United Arab Emirates) Dubai Open	8 – 12 December	Canceled			Not contested		
(Spain) Master Final	17 – 21 December	(Argentina) Maxi Sánchez (Argentina) Sanyo Gutiérrez	7–6 / 5–7 / 7–5	(Argentina) Fernando Belasteguín (Spain) Juan Martín Díaz	(Spain) Mapi Sánchez Alayeto (Spain) Majo Sánchez Alayeto	6–4 / 7–5	(Spain) Lucía Sainz (Spain) Marta Ortega

== End of season ranking ==
Male

2014 Men's Ranking			Tournaments Won		
N.º	Name	Points	Open	Master Final	Total
1	(Argentina) Fernando Belasteguín	8.585	9	0	9
1	(Spain) Juan Martín Díaz	8.585	9	0	9
3	(Brazil) Pablo Lima	5.517	2	0	2
3	(Spain) Juani Mieres	5.517	2	0	2
5	(Argentina) Sanyo Gutiérrez	4.000	1	1	2
5	(Argentina) Maxi Sánchez	4.000	1	1	2
7	(Spain) Paquito Navarro	3.529	2	0	2
8	(Argentina) Maxi Grabiel	3.421	2	0	2
9	(Argentina) Cristián Gutiérrez	3.257	0	0	0
9	(Spain) Matías Díaz	3.257	0	0	0
11	(Argentina) Adrián Allemandi	2.538	0	0	0
12	(Argentina) Miguel Lamperti	2.423	0	0	0
13	(Spain) Aday Santana	1.800	0	0	0
13	(Spain) Jordi Muñoz	1.800	0	0	0
15	(Argentina) Gabriel Reca	1.700	0	0	0
15	(Argentina) Seba Nerone	1.700	0	0	0

Female

2014 Women's Ranking			Tournaments Won		
N.º	Name	Points	Open	Master Final	Total
1	(Spain) Mapi Sánchez Alayeto	6.300	3	1	4
1	(Spain) Majo Sánchez Alayeto	6.300	3	1	4
3	(Spain) Alejandra Salazar	6.150	3	0	3
3	(Spain) Icíar Montes	6.150	3	0	3
5	(Spain) Elisabeth Amatriaín	4.550	1	0	1
5	(Spain) Patricia Llaguno	4.550	1	0	1
7	(Spain) Marta Marrero	4.086	1	0	1
8	(Spain) Catalina Tenorio	3.800	1	0	1
9	(Spain) Carolina Navarro	3.338	0	0	0
9	(Argentina) Cecilia Reiter	3.338	0	0	0
11	(Spain) Lucía Sainz	2.550	0	0	0
11	(Spain) Marta Ortega	2.550	0	0	0
13	(Argentina) Nelida Brito	1.688	0	0	0
13	(Argentina) Valeria Pavón	1.688	0	0	0
15	(Argentina) Paula Eyheraguibel	1.575	0	0	0
