= Pablo Semprún =

Spanish tennis and padel tennis player

- Country (sports): Spain
- Born: 5 August 1964 (age 60); Madrid, Spain
- Official website: http://pablosemprunsportcenter.com

Pablo Semprún (born August 5, 1964) is a Spanish former Spanish tennis and padel tennis player from Madrid. He founded the Pablo Semprún Sport Center, a padel tennis academy and sport center.

== Paddle tennis achievements ==
- Five-time Spanish champion
- (Doubles) Sub-world champion (1996) – Madrid, Spain
- (Doubles) World champion team (1998) – Mar Del Plata, Argentina
- (Doubles) European championship (1995) – Ravenna, Italy
- International champion of Spain (1998)
- International champion of France (1999)
- Bronze medal for Sports Merit (2003)
