= 2018 WPT Murcia Open =

World Padel Tour tournament held in Murcia, Spain

- Date: 18 – 25 November
- Edition: 3rd (Note: The first edition was held under the organization of the Padel Pro Tour.)
- Category: Open
- Location: Murcia, Spain
- Venue: Palacio de Deportes de Murcia

Champions
- Men's doubles: (Argentina) Maxi Sánchez (Argentina) Sanyo Gutiérrez
- Women's doubles: (Spain) Alejandra Salazar (Spain) Marta Marrero

Chronology

The 2018 Murcia Open (officially 2018 World Padel Tour Murcia Open) was the sixteenth tournament of the sixth season organized by World Padel Tour, the most prestigious padel circuit at the time.

In the women’s category, for the sixth time this season, the world’s number 1 and number 3 ranked pairs reached the final. In the decisive match, Alejandra Salazar and Marta Marrero defeated the twins Majo and Mapi Sánchez in three sets, securing their fifth title of the season. This result allowed them to move up from world number 3 to world number 2 ranked pair, increased their head-to-head record in finals against the Sánchez twins to 5–1 in their favor, tied them with their rivals at five WPT titles each (six for the twins counting world pairs championship), and made them the first women's pair to win a title in Murcia.

In the men’s category, the world number one's, Maxi Sánchez and Sanyo Gutiérrez, reached their 11th final of the season (out of a possible 15), facing the second-ranked duo, Pablo Lima and Paquito Navarro, who reached their second final in as many tournaments since joining forces. In the title match, Sánchez and Gutiérrez, who by reaching the final had already mathematically secured finishing the year as the number one ranked duo (the first time in 16 years that Fernando Belasteguín didn't finish the season as world number one), defeated Lima and Navarro to claim their eighth title of the season, and their first-ever victory in Murcia.

== Head-to-head record between teams ranked in the top 4 during the season ==
=== Men's ===
Record	Maxi–Sanyo	Lima–Paquito Navarro	Galán–M. Díaz	Gutiérrez–Stupaczuk	Former Pairs	J.M. Díaz–Paquito	Belasteguín–Lima	Lima–M. Jardim	Lima–Silingo
Maxi–Sanyo	—	1–0	2–3	3–2		5–0	0–1	—	—
Lima–Paquito	0–1	—	—	1–0		—	—	—	—
Galán–M. Díaz	3–2	—	—	2–2		1–2	0–1	—	—
Gutiérrez–Stupaczuk	2–3	0–1	2–2	—		—	0–1	1–0	—
Former Pairs									
J.M. Díaz–Paquito	0–5	—	2–1	—		—	0–2	—	—
Belasteguín–Lima	1–0	—	1–0	1–0		2–0	—	—	—
Lima–M. Jardim	—	—	—	0–1		—	—	—	—
Lima–Silingo	—	—	—	—		—	—	—	—

=== Women's ===
Record	Majo–Mapi	Marrero–Salazar	Triay–Sainz	Ariana–Ortega	Former Pairs	Amatriain–Llaguno
Majo–Mapi	—	4–5	4–3	5–1		6–0
Marrero–Salazar	5–4	—	5–5	2–0		2–0
Triay–Sainz	3–4	5–5	—	2–0		3–1
Ariana–Ortega	1–5	0–2	0–2	—		3–1
Former Pairs						
Amatriain–Llaguno	0–6	0–2	1–3	1–3		—

== Draws ==
=== Men's Bracket ===
Round of 32
1	(Argentina) Maxi / (Argentina) Sanyo
Bye
Q	(Spain) A. Blanco / (Spain) J. Vazquez	6	6
(Argentina) M. Nicoletti / (Spain) P.A. Martínez	4	2
(Argentina) L. Capra / (Argentina) R. Moyano	6	6
(Spain) J.G. Diestro / (Spain) M. Piñeiro	2	1
(Spain) G. Rubio / (Spain) E. Moreno	5	6	2
(Spain) J. Ruiz / (Spain) U. Botello	7	2	6
(Argentina) C. Gutiérrez / (Argentina) Stupaczuk	6	6
(Spain) J. Muñoz / (Spain) W. Lahoz	4	4
(Uruguay) D. Ramos / (Spain) R. Méndez	4	3
(Spain) A. Ruiz / (Argentina) Tapia	6	6
(Brazil) L. Bergamini / (Brazil) L. Campagnolo	5	6
Q	(Argentina) F. Chingotto / (Argentina) J. Tello	7	7
Bye
3	(Spain) Galán / (Spain) M. Díaz
4	(Spain) J. Mieres / (Argentina) M. Lamperti
Bye
(Argentina) G. Tamame / (Spain) N. Gadea	4	3
(Spain) Coki / (Spain) J. Rico	6	6
Q	(Spain) J. Barahona / (Argentina) J. Vázquez	6	6
(Argentina) F. Poggi / (Brazil) M. Jardim	4	3
(Argentina) F. Quiles / (Argentina) M. Grabiel	0	3
(Spain) J.M. Díaz / (Spain) Lebrón	6	6
(Spain) J.C. Belluati / (Spain) P. Lijó	3	2
(Spain) J. Rico / (Spain) V. Ruiz	6	6
(Argentina) A. Allemandi / (Argentina) A. Silingo	6	6
(Brazil) F. Gomes / (Spain) J. Garrido	2	2
(Spain) Á. Cepero / (Argentina) S. Nerone	6	6	6
(Spain) A. Santana / (Argentina) Godo Díaz	1	7	3
Bye
2	(Brazil) Lima / (Spain) Paquito

Round of 16
1	(Argentina) Maxi / (Argentina) Sanyo	6	6
(Spain) A. Blanco / (Spain) J. Vazquez	3	4
(Argentina) L. Capra / (Argentina) R. Moyano	6	7
(Spain) J. Ruiz / (Spain) U. Botello	4	6
(Argentina) C. Gutiérrez / (Argentina) Stupaczuk	7	4	6
(Spain) A. Ruiz / (Argentina) Tapia	6	6	1
(Argentina) F. Chingotto / (Argentina) J. Tello	4	7	6
3	(Spain) Galán / (Spain) M. Díaz	6	5	1
4	(Spain) J. Mieres / (Argentina) M. Lamperti	6	7
(Spain) Coki / (Spain) J. Rico	1	6
(Spain) J. Barahona / (Argentina) J. Vázquez	2	1
(Spain) J.M. Díaz / (Spain) Lebrón	6	6
(Spain) J. Rico / (Spain) V. Ruiz	4	2
(Argentina) A. Allemandi / (Argentina) A. Silingo	6	6
(Spain) Á. Cepero / (Argentina) S. Nerone	2	0
2	(Brazil) Lima / (Spain) Paquito	6	6

Quarter-Final
1	(Argentina) Maxi / (Argentina) Sanyo	7	6
(Argentina) L. Capra / (Argentina) R. Moyano	5	1
(Argentina) C. Gutiérrez / (Argentina) Stupaczuk	0	1
(Argentina) F. Chingotto / (Argentina) J. Tello	6	4	*
4	(Spain) J. Mieres / (Argentina) M. Lamperti	6	3	4
(Spain) J.M. Díaz / (Spain) Lebrón	4	6	6
(Argentina) A. Allemandi / (Argentina) A. Silingo	2	1
2	(Brazil) Lima / (Spain) Paquito	6	6

Semi-Finals
1	(Argentina) Maxi / (Argentina) Sanyo	6	6
(Argentina) F. Chingotto / (Argentina) J. Tello	3	4
(Spain) J.M. Díaz / (Spain) Lebrón	3	3
2	(Brazil) Lima / (Spain) Paquito	6	6

Finals
1	(Argentina) Maxi / (Argentina) Sanyo	2	7	6
2	(Brazil) Lima / (Spain) Paquito	6	5	3

=== Women's Bracket ===
Round of 32
1	(Spain) Majo / (Spain) Mapi
Bye
Q	(Spain) N. Traviesa / (Brazil) R. Piltcher	4	6	3
(Spain) P. Josemaria / (Argentina) V. Pavón	6	2	6
Q	(Spain) N. Rovira / (Spain) R. Aguilar	6	3
(France) A. Collombon / (Spain) S. Pujals	7	6
(Spain) A. Martinez / (Spain) M. Talavan	6	7
(Spain) T. Navarro / (Spain) V. Iglesias	1	5
(Spain) B. González / (Argentina) C. Tenorio	6	6
(Spain) A.F. de Ossó / (Spain) N. Márquez	3	3
(Spain) M. Truchado / (Spain) S. Vidal	1	3
(Spain) T. Icardo / (Spain) S. Ruiz	6	6
(Portugal) S. Araújo / (Argentina) V. Riera	3	2
(Spain) A. Tapia / (Spain) J. Castelló	6	6
Bye
4	(Spain) A. Sánchez / (Spain) M. Ortega
3	(Spain) A. Salazar / (Spain) M. Marrero
Bye
(Spain) L. Alonso / (Spain) M. Gabarrus	1	3
(Argentina) A. Osoro / (Argentina) N. Brito	6	6
(Spain) C. Mesa / (Spain) L. Martínez	6	6	6
(Spain) S. Hernández / (Spain) V. Virseda	7	4	1
Q	(Argentina) C. Paz / (Portugal) F. Mendonça	3	0
(Spain) E. Amatriain / (Spain) P. Llaguno	6	6
(Spain) C. Navarro / (Argentina) C. Reiter	6	6
(Spain) A. Blanco / (Spain) B. Caldera	3	2
(Spain) A. Cantin / (Spain) N. Rodriguez	6	7
(Spain) I. Domínguez / (Spain) V. Alonso	3	6
(Portugal) A.C. Nogueira / (Argentina) Delfina	3	5
(Spain) A. Galán / (Spain) M. Villalba	6	7
Bye
2	(Spain) Gemma / (Spain) L. Sainz

Round of 16
1	(Spain) Majo / (Spain) Mapi	7	6
(Spain) P. Josemaria / (Argentina) V. Pavón	5	3
(France) A. Collombon / (Spain) S. Pujals	5	6	6
(Spain) A. Martinez / (Spain) M. Talavan	7	2	2
(Spain) B. González / (Argentina) C. Tenorio	6	6
(Spain) T. Icardo / (Spain) S. Ruiz	1	4
(Spain) A. Tapia / (Spain) J. Castelló	1	5
4	(Spain) A. Sánchez / (Spain) M. Ortega	6	7
3	(Spain) A. Salazar / (Spain) M. Marrero	6	6
(Argentina) A. Osoro / (Argentina) N. Brito	1	0
(Spain) C. Mesa / (Spain) L. Martínez	3	0
(Spain) E. Amatriain / (Spain) P. Llaguno	6	6
(Spain) C. Navarro / (Argentina) C. Reiter	6	7
(Spain) A. Cantin / (Spain) N. Rodriguez	2	5
(Spain) A. Galán / (Spain) M. Villalba	0	2
2	(Spain) Gemma / (Spain) L. Sainz	6	6

Quarter-Final
1	(Spain) Majo / (Spain) Mapi	6	6
(France) A. Collombon / (Spain) S. Pujals	0	0
(Spain) B. González / (Argentina) C. Tenorio	6	6	1
4	(Spain) A. Sánchez / (Spain) M. Ortega	0	7	6
3	(Spain) A. Salazar / (Spain) M. Marrero	6	7
(Spain) E. Amatriain / (Spain) P. Llaguno	4	6
(Spain) C. Navarro / (Argentina) C. Reiter
2	(Spain) Gemma / (Spain) L. Sainz	*

Semi-Finals
1	(Spain) Majo / (Spain) Mapi	6	6
4	(Spain) A. Sánchez / (Spain) M. Ortega	3	4
3	(Spain) A. Salazar / (Spain) M. Marrero	7	6
2	(Spain) Gemma / (Spain) L. Sainz	6	2

Finals
1	(Spain) Majo / (Spain) Mapi	5	6	1
3	(Spain) A. Salazar / (Spain) M. Marrero	7	4	6

== Results ==
=== Round of 32 ===
Men's
Date	Winners	Score	Opponent	Ref.
21/11/2018	(Spain) Adrián Blanco (Spain) Javier Martinez Vazquez	6–4 / 6–2	(Argentina) Matías Nicoletti (Spain) Pedro Alonso Martínez	
21/11/2018	(Argentina) Lucho Capra (Argentina) Ramiro Moyano	6–2 / 6–1	(Spain) José García Diestro (Spain) Martin Sanchez Piñeiro	
21/11/2018	(Spain) Javi Ruiz (Spain) Uri Botello	7–5 / 2–6 / 6–2	(Spain) Gonzalo Rubio (Spain) Ernesto Moreno	
21/11/2018	(Argentina) Cristian Gutiérrez (Argentina) Franco Stupaczuk	6–4 / 6–4	(Spain) Jordi Muñoz (Spain) Willy Lahoz	
21/11/2018	(Argentina) Agustín Tapia (Spain) Alejandro Ruiz	6–4 / 6–3	(Uruguay) Diego Ramos (Spain) Rafael Méndez	
21/11/2018	(Argentina) Federico Chingotto (Argentina) Juan Tello	7–5 / 7–6	(Brazil) Lucas Bergamini (Brazil) Lucas Campagnolo	
21/11/2018	(Spain) Coki Nieto (Spain) Javi Rico	6–4 / 6–3	(Argentina) Germán Tamame (Spain) Nacho Gadea	
21/11/2018	(Spain) Javier Barahona (Argentina) Juan Manuel Vázquez	6–4 / 6–3	(Argentina) Fernando Poggi (Brazil) Marcelo Jardim	
21/11/2018	(Spain) Juan Lebrón (Spain) Juan Martin Díaz	6–0 / 6–3	(Argentina) Federico Quiles (Argentina) Maxi Grabiel	
21/11/2018	(Spain) José Rico (Spain) Víctor Ruiz	6–3 / 6–2	(Argentina) Juan Cruz Belluati (Spain) Pablo Lijó	
21/11/2018	(Argentina) Agustin Goméz Silingo (Argentina) Adrián Allemandi	6–2 / 6–2	(Brazil) Francisco Gomes (Spain) Javi Garrido	
21/11/2018	(Spain) Álvaro Cepero (Argentina) Sebastián Nerone	6–1 / 6–7 / 6–3	(Spain) Aday Santana (Argentina) Godo Díaz	

Women's
Date	Winners	Score	Opponent	Ref.
21/11/2018	(Spain) Paula Josemaria (Argentina) Valeria Pavón	6–4 / 2–6 / 6–3	(Spain) Nicole Traviesa Mola (Brazil) Raquel Piltcher	
21/11/2018	(France) Alix Collombon (Spain) Sara Pujals	7–6 / 6–3	(Spain) Nuria Rovira (Spain) Raquel Segura Aguilar	
21/11/2018	(Spain) Araceli Martinez (Spain) Marta Talavan	6–1 / 7–5	(Spain) Teresa Navarro (Spain) Victoria Iglesias	
21/11/2018	(Spain) Beatriz González (Argentina) Catalina Tenorio	6–3 / 6–3	(Spain) Ana Fernández de Ossó (Spain) Noelia Márquez	
21/11/2018	(Spain) Sara Ruiz (Spain) Tamara Icardo	6–1 / 6–3	(Spain) Meli García Truchado (Spain) Silvia Lopez Vidal	
21/11/2018	(Spain) Anna Cortiles Tapia (Spain) Jessica Castelló	6–3 / 6–2	(Portugal) Sofia Araújo (Argentina) Virginia Riera	
21/11/2018	(Argentina) Aranzazu Osoro (Argentina) Nela Brito	6–1 / 6–3	(Spain) Lorena Alonso (Spain) Maite Gabarrus	
21/11/2018	(Spain) Carla Mesa (Spain) Lucía Martínez	6–7 / 6–4 / 6–1	(Spain) Sandra Hernández (Spain) Verónica Virseda	
21/11/2018	(Spain) Elisabeth Amatriain (Spain) Patricia Llaguno	6–3 / 6–0	(Argentina) Celeste Paz (Portugal) Filipa Mendonça	
21/11/2018	(Spain) Carolina Navarro (Argentina) Cecilia Reiter	6–3 / 6–2	(Spain) Alicia Blanco Rojo (Spain) Beatriz Caldera	
21/11/2018	(Spain) Angela Caro Cantin (Spain) Nuria Rodriguez	6–3 / 7–6	(Spain) Isabel Domínguez (Spain) Vanesa Alonso	
21/11/2018	(Spain) Alba Galán (Spain) Maria Villalba	6–3 / 7–5	(Portugal) Ana Catarina Nogueira (Argentina) Delfina Brea	

=== Round of 16 ===
Men's
Date	Winners	Score	Opponent	Ref.
22/11/2018	(Argentina) Maxi Sánchez (Argentina) Sanyo Gutiérrez	6–3 / 6–4	(Spain) Adrián Blanco (Spain) Javier Martinez Vazquez	
22/11/2018	(Argentina) Lucho Capra (Argentina) Ramiro Moyano	6–4 / 7–6	(Spain) Javi Ruiz (Spain) Uri Botello	
22/11/2018	(Argentina) Cristian Gutiérrez (Argentina) Franco Stupaczuk	7–6 / 4–6 / 6–1	(Argentina) Agustín Tapia (Spain) Alejandro Ruiz	
22/11/2018	(Argentina) Federico Chingotto (Argentina) Juan Tello	4–6 / 7–5 / 6–1	(Spain) Alejandro Galán (Spain) Matías Díaz	
22/11/2018	(Spain) Juani Mieres (Argentina) Miguel Lamperti	6–1 / 7–6	(Spain) Coki Nieto (Spain) Javi Rico	
22/11/2018	(Spain) Juan Lebrón (Spain) Juan Martin Díaz	6–2 / 6–1	(Spain) Javier Barahona (Argentina) Juan Manuel Vázquez	
22/11/2018	(Argentina) Agustin Goméz Silingo (Argentina) Adrián Allemandi	6–4 / 6–2	(Spain) José Rico (Spain) Víctor Ruiz	
22/11/2018	(Brazil) Pablo Lima (Spain) Paquito Navarro	6–2 / 6–0	(Spain) Álvaro Cepero (Argentina) Sebastián Nerone	

Women's
Date	Winners	Score	Opponent	Ref.
22/11/2018	(Spain) Majo Sánchez (Spain) Mapi Sánchez	7–5 / 6–3	(Spain) Paula Josemaria (Argentina) Valeria Pavón	
22/11/2018	(France) Alix Collombon (Spain) Sara Pujals	5–7 / 6–2 / 6–2	(Spain) Araceli Martinez (Spain) Marta Talavan	
22/11/2018	(Spain) Beatriz González (Argentina) Catalina Tenorio	6–1 / 6–4	(Spain) Sara Ruiz (Spain) Tamara Icardo	
22/11/2018	(Spain) Ariana Sánchez (Spain) Marta Ortega	6–1 / 7–5	(Spain) Anna Cortiles Tapia (Spain) Jessica Castelló	
22/11/2018	(Spain) Alejandra Salazar (Spain) Marta Marrero	6–1 / 6–0	(Argentina) Aranzazu Osoro (Argentina) Nela Brito	
22/11/2018	(Spain) Elisabeth Amatriain (Spain) Patricia Llaguno	6–3 / 6–0	(Spain) Carla Mesa (Spain) Lucía Martínez	
22/11/2018	(Spain) Carolina Navarro (Argentina) Cecilia Reiter	6–2 / 7–5	(Spain) Angela Caro Cantin (Spain) Nuria Rodriguez	
22/11/2018	(Spain) Gemma Triay (Spain) Lucía Sainz	6–0 / 6–2	(Spain) Alba Galán (Spain) Maria Villalba	

=== Quarter-Finals ===
Men's
Date	Winners	Score	Opponent	Ref.
23/11/2018	(Argentina) Maxi Sánchez (Argentina) Sanyo Gutiérrez	7–5 / 6–1	(Argentina) Lucho Capra (Argentina) Ramiro Moyano	
23/11/2018	(Argentina) Federico Chingotto (Argentina) Juan Tello	6–0 / 4–1 / W.O	(Argentina) Cristian Gutiérrez (Argentina) Franco Stupaczuk	
23/11/2018	(Spain) Juan Lebrón (Spain) Juan Martin Díaz	4–6 / 6–3 / 6–4	(Spain) Juani Mieres (Argentina) Miguel Lamperti	
23/11/2018	(Brazil) Pablo Lima (Spain) Paquito Navarro	6–2 / 6–1	(Argentina) Agustin Goméz Silingo (Argentina) Adrián Allemandi	

Women's
Date	Winners	Score	Opponent	Ref.
23/11/2018	(Spain) Majo Sánchez (Spain) Mapi Sánchez	6–0 / 6–0	(France) Alix Collombon (Spain) Sara Pujals	
23/11/2018	(Spain) Ariana Sánchez (Spain) Marta Ortega	0–6 / 7–6 / 6–1	(Spain) Beatriz González (Argentina) Catalina Tenorio	
23/11/2018	(Spain) Alejandra Salazar (Spain) Marta Marrero	6–4 / 7–6	(Spain) Elisabeth Amatriain (Spain) Patricia Llaguno	
23/11/2018	(Spain) Gemma Triay (Spain) Lucía Sainz	W.O.	(Spain) Carolina Navarro (Argentina) Cecilia Reiter	

=== Semi-Finals ===
Men's
Date	Winners	Score	Opponent	Ref.
24/11/2018	(Argentina) Maxi Sánchez (Argentina) Sanyo Gutiérrez	6–3 / 6–4	(Argentina) Federico Chingotto (Argentina) Juan Tello	
24/11/2018	(Brazil) Pablo Lima (Spain) Paquito Navarro	6–3 / 6–3	(Spain) Juan Lebrón (Spain) Juan Martin Díaz	

Women's
Date	Winners	Score	Opponent	Ref.
24/11/2018	(Spain) Majo Sánchez (Spain) Mapi Sánchez	6–3 / 6–4	(Spain) Ariana Sánchez (Spain) Marta Ortega	
24/11/2018	(Spain) Alejandra Salazar (Spain) Marta Marrero	7–6 / 6–2	(Spain) Gemma Triay (Spain) Lucía Sainz	

=== Finals ===
Men's
Date	Winners	Score	Opponent	Ref.
25/11/2018	(Argentina) Maxi Sánchez (Argentina) Sanyo Gutiérrez	2–6 / 7–5 / 6–3	(Brazil) Pablo Lima (Spain) Paquito Navarro	

Women's
Date	Winners	Score	Opponent	Ref.
25/11/2018	(Spain) Alejandra Salazar (Spain) Marta Marrero	7–5 / 4–6 / 6–1	(Spain) Majo Sánchez (Spain) Mapi Sánchez	
