= Padel World Championship =

International athletic competition

The Padel World Championship is an international competition of padel that has been held every second year since 1992. The first edition was held in Spain. The event is organized by the International Padel Federation and includes both male and female competitions.

== Winners by year ==
=== National teams ===
==== Men's teams ====
Year	Host (final location)	Gold medal game			Bronze medal game
Year	Host (final location)	Gold	Score	Silver	Bronze	Score	Fourth place
1992	ESP (Madrid)	Argentina	3–0	Spain	Uruguay		United Kingdom
1994	ARG (Mendoza)	Argentina	3–0	Spain	Uruguay		Chile
1996	ESP (Madrid)	Argentina	3–0	Spain	Brazil	2–1	Uruguay
1998	ARG (Mar del Plata)	Spain	3–1	Argentina	Brazil	3–0	Chile
2000	FRA (Toulouse)	Argentina	3–0	Spain	Brazil		Uruguay
2002	MEX (Mexico City)	Argentina	3–0	Spain	Brazil		Mexico
2004	ARG (Buenos Aires)	Argentina	3–0	Spain	Brazil	3–0	Chile
2006	ESP (Murcia)	Argentina	3–0	Brazil	Spain		Chile
2008	CAN (Calgary)	Spain	3–0	Argentina	Brazil		Chile
2010	MEX (Riviera Maya)	Spain	2–1	Argentina	Brazil	3–0	Chile
2012	MEX (Riviera Maya)	Argentina	2–1	Brazil	Paraguay	3–0	Uruguay
2014	ESP (Palma de Majorca)	Argentina	2–1	Spain	Paraguay	2–1	Chile
2016	POR (Cascais)	Argentina	2–1	Spain	Brazil	3–0	Uruguay
2018	PAR (Asunción)	Was not played due to organizational issues.			Was not played due to organizational issues.
2021	QAT (Doha)	Spain	2–0	Argentina	Brazil	3–0	France
2022	UAE (Dubai)	Argentina	2–1	Spain	France	2–1	Portugal
2024	QAT (Doha)	Argentina	2–1	Spain	Portugal	2–0	Italy
2026	QAT (Doha)	Spain	2–1	Argentina	Portugal	2–1	Italy

==== Women's teams ====
Year	Host (final location)	Gold medal game			Bronze medal game
Year	Host (final location)	Gold	Score	Silver	Bronze	Score	Fourth place
1992	ESP (Madrid)	Argentina	3–0	Spain	Uruguay		United Kingdom
1994	ARG (Mendoza)	Argentina	3–0	Spain	Uruguay		Paraguay
1996	ESP (Madrid)	Argentina	3–0	Spain	Uruguay	2–1	Brazil
1998	ARG (Mar del Plata)	Spain	2–1	Argentina	Uruguay	2–1	Brazil
2000	FRA (Toulouse)	Spain	3–0	Argentina	Brazil		Uruguay
2002	MEX (Mexico City)	Argentina	2–1	Spain	Mexico	3–0	Uruguay
2004	ARG (Buenos Aires)	Argentina	2–1	Spain	Brazil	3–0	Mexico
2006	ESP (Murcia)	Argentina	2–1	Spain	Brazil		Mexico
2008	CAN (Calgary)	Argentina	3–0	Spain	Brazil		France
2010	MEX (Riviera Maya)	Spain	2–1	Argentina	Brazil	3–0	France
2012	MEX (Riviera Maya)	Argentina	3–0	Brazil	France	2–1	Portugal
2014	ESP (Palma de Mallorca)	Spain	3–0	Argentina	Portugal	3–0	Italy
2016	POR (Cascais)	Spain	3–0	Argentina	Brazil	2–1	Sweden
2018	PAR (Asunción)	Spain	2–0	Argentina
2021	QAT (Doha)	Spain	3–0	Argentina	Italy	2–1	France
2022	UAE (Dubai)	Spain	2–0	Argentina	Italy	2–1	Belgium
2024	QAT (Doha)	Spain	2–0	Argentina	Italy	2–1	Portugal
2026	QAT (Doha)	Spain	2–0	Argentina	Italy	2–0	France

=== Pairs ===
Edition	Host	Date	Men's				Women's			
Edition	Host	Date	Champions	Score in the final	Runners-up	Semifinalists	Champions	Score in the final	Runners-up	Semifinalists
World Padel Pairs Championships
1.	Seville, Spain	21 – 27 September 1992	(Argentina) Alejandro Lasaigues (Argentina) Roberto Gattiker	Unknown	(Argentina) Javier Maquirriain (Argentina) Pablo Rovaletti	(Argentina) Diego de La Torre (Argentina) Horacio Álvarez Clementi (Argentina) Alejandro Sanz (Argentina) Marcelo Cubas	(Argentina) Cecilia Baccigalupo (Argentina) Virginia Mazzuchi	Unknown	(Argentina) Daniela Álvarez (Argentina) Verónica Costabel	(Argentina) Maria José Sbrascini (Argentina) Silvia Corizzo Unknown
2.	Mendoza, Argentina	24 – 30 October 1994	(Argentina) Alejandro Lasaigues (Argentina) Roberto Gattiker	Unknown	(Argentina) Hernán Auguste (Argentina) Mariano Lasaigues	(Argentina) Alejandro Sanz (Argentina) Juan Martín Díaz (Argentina) Alejandro Novillo (Argentina) Javier Siro	(Argentina) Adriana Costagliola (Argentina) Cecilia Baccigalupo	Unknown	(Spain) Maria Silvela (Spain) Rocio Fernández	Unknown Unknown
3.	Madrid, Spain	23 – 29 September 1996	(Argentina) Alejandro Lasaigues (Argentina) Roberto Gattiker	Unknown	(Spain) Alberto Rodríguez Piñón (Spain) Pablo Semprún	(Argentina) Gabriel Reca (Argentina) José Serrano (Argentina) Hernán Auguste (Argentina) Mariano Lasaigues	(Argentina) Adriana Costagliola (Argentina) Cecilia Baccigalupo	Unknown	(Argentina) Inés Alvarez (Argentina) Paula Eyheraguibel	(Spain) Araceli Montero (Spain) Icíar Montes (Argentina) Catalina Tenorio (Argentina) Eugenia Vassallo
4.	Mar del Plata, Argentina	1998	(Argentina) Cristian Gutiérrez Albizu (Argentina) Roberto Gattiker	7–6 / 6–2	(Spain) Alberto Rodríguez Piñón (Spain) Juan Martín Díaz	(Argentina) Alejandro Lasaigues (Argentina) Hernán Auguste (Argentina) Alejandro Sanz (Argentina) Javier Siro	(Spain) Araceli Montero (Spain) Icíar Montes	6–2 / 3–6 / 6–0	(Argentina) Claudia Céspedes (Argentina) Inés Alvarez	(Argentina) Paula Eyheraguibel (Uruguay) Maria Teresa Ruiz (Spain) Carolina Navarro (Spain) Maria Silvela
5.	Toulouse, France	26 June – 2 July 2000	(Argentina) Hernán Auguste (Spain) Juan Martín Díaz	3–6 / 6–1 / 6–4	(Argentina) Gabriel Reca (Argentina) Sebastián Nerone	(Argentina) Fernando Belasteguín (Argentina) Guillermo Demianiuk (Argentina) Alejandro Lasaigues (Argentina) Roberto Gattiker	(Spain) Carolina Navarro (Spain) Icíar Montes	6–3 / 3–6 / 6–2	(Argentina) Adriana Costagliola (Spain) María Silvela	(Argentina) Paula Eyheraguibel (Uruguay) Maria Teresa Ruiz (Argentina) Eugenia Vassallo (Argentina) Mariana Pérez
6.	Mexico City, Mexico	25 November – 1 December 2002	(Argentina) Fernando Belasteguín (Spain) Juan Martín Díaz	6–7 / 7–5 / 6–4	(Argentina) Gabriel Reca (Argentina) Sebastián Nerone	(Argentina) Roberto Gattiker (Spain) Willy Lahoz (Argentina) Cristian Gutiérrez (Argentina) Pablo Rovaletti	(Spain) Icíar Montes (Brazil) Nekand Berwi	6–2 / 6–2	(Spain) Carolina Navarro (Argentina) Paula Eyheraguibel	(Argentina) Adriana Costagliola (Spain) Maria Silvela (Argentina) Catalina Tenorio (Argentina) Mariana Pérez
7.	Buenos Aires, Argentina	15 – 21 November 2004	(Argentina) Fernando Belasteguín (Spain) Juan Martín Díaz	4–6 / 6–4 / 6–1	(Argentina) Gabriel Reca (Argentina) Sebastián Nerone	(Brazil) Marcello Jardim (Spain) Willy Lahoz (Argentina) Cristian Gutiérrez (Argentina) Hernán Auguste	(Spain) Icíar Montes (Argentina) Paula Eyheraguibel	6–1 / 6–3	(Argentina) Nela Brito (Argentina) Valeria Pavón	(Spain) María José LLorca (Spain) Maria Silvela (Argentina) Catalina Tenorio (Argentina) Mariana Pérez
8.	Murcia, Spain	23 – 29 October 2006	(Argentina) Cristian Gutiérrez (Argentina) Hernán Auguste	6–2 / 6–1	(Spain) David Losada (Spain) Juani Mieres	(Brazil) Marcello Jardim (Spain) Willy Lahoz (Argentina) Cristian Gutiérrez (Argentina) Hernán Auguste	(Spain) Carolina Navarro (Argentina) Paula Eyheraguibel	3–6 / 7–5 / 6–1	(Argentina) Catalina Tenorio (Argentina) Valeria Pavón	(Argentina) Daniela Banchero (Argentina) Nelo Brito (Spain) Icíar Montes (Brazil) Nekand Berwig
World Padel National Pairs Championships
9.	Calgary, Canada	23 – 30 August 2008	(Spain) David Losada (Spain) Juani Mieres	6–4 / 3–6 / 6–2	(Brazil) Gervasio Del Bono (Brazil) Julio Julianoti	(Argentina) Fernando Cavalieri (Argentina) Rodrigo Ovide (Spain) Jordi Muñoz (Spain) Paquito Navarro	(Spain) Ana Fernández de Osso (Spain) María Wakonigg	6–3 / 6–3	(Spain) Eva Gayoso (Spain) Patricia Llaguno	(Spain) Almudena Marchena (Spain) Marta Ruiz (Spain) Begoña Garralda (Argentina) Melissa Capra
10.	Riviera Maya, Mexico	29 November – 5 December 2010	(Spain) Juani Mieres (Spain) Willy Lahoz	6–1 / 7–5	(Spain) Javier Limones (Spain) Raúl Arias	(Spain) Aday Santana (Spain) Jaime Muñoz (Brazil) Gervasio Del Bono / (Brazil) Julio Julianoti	(Spain) Icíar Montes (Spain) Patricia Llaguno	6–3 / 5–7 / 6–4	(Spain) Alejandra Salazar (Spain) Carolina Navarro	(Argentina) Cecilia Reiter (Argentina) Valeria Pavon (Spain) Majo Sánchez (Spain) Mapi Sánchez
11.	Riviera Maya, Mexico	26 November – 2 December 2012	(Brazil) Gervasio Del Bono (Brazil) Julio Julianoti	6–7 / 6–4 / 7–6	(Argentina) Godo Díaz (Argentina) Gustavo Pratto	(Argentina) David Gutiérrez (Argentina) Ramiro Moyano (Uruguay) Eduardo Casabo (Uruguay) Diego Ramos	(Argentina) Silvana Campus (Argentina) Paula Eyheraguibel	4–6 / 6–0 / 6–2	(Argentina) Daniela Banchero (Argentina) Danielas Niella	(Argentina) Mariela Peyregne (Argentina) Virginia Riera (France) Gassis (France) Dalbergue
World Padel Open Pairs Championships
12.	Barcelona, Spain	26 March – 1 April 2012	(Argentina) Cristian Gutiérrez (Argentina) Fernando Poggi	6–2 / 6–7 / 6–3	(Spain) Juani Mieres (Brazil) Pablo Lima	(Argentina) Hernán Auguste (Spain) Matías Díaz (Argentina) Agustín Gómez Silingo (Argentina) Gabriel Reca	(Spain) Carolina Navarro (Argentina) Cecilia Reiter	7–6 / 6–2	(Spain) Elisabeth Amatriain (Spain) Patricia Llaguno	(Spain) Carolina Gago (Argentina) Paula Eyheraguibel (Spain) Alejandra Salazar (Argentina) Valeria Pavón
13.	Bilbao, Spain	12 – 17 November 2013	(Argentina) Franco Stupaczuk (Argentina) Martín Di Nenno	6–4 / 6–4	(Spain) Guillermo Santos (Spain) Manuel Fernández	Unknown Unknown	(Spain) Carla Mesa (Spain) Clara Siverio	6–4 / 2–6 / 6–4	(Argentina) Silvana Campus (Argentina) Virginia Riera	(Brazil) Michele Treptow (Spain) Noelia Márquez (Argentina) Ana Laura Grandes (Spain) Sandra Hernández
World Padel National Pairs Championships
14.	Palma de Mallorca, Spain	20 – 26 October 2014	(Spain) Juani Mieres (Spain) Matías Díaz	6–4 / 6–4	(Spain) Paquito Navarro (Spain) Willy Lahoz	(Argentina) Fernando Poggi (Spain) Javier Limones (Spain) Aday Santana (Spain) Jaime Muñoz	(Spain) Elisabet Amatriain (Spain) Patricia Llaguno	6–2 / 6–4	(Spain) Carolina Navarro (Spain) Marta Ortega	(Argentina) Silvana Campus (Argentina) Virginia Riera (Argentina) Cecilia Reiter (Argentina) Daniela Banchero
15.	Cascais, Portugal	14 – 20 November 2016	(Spain) Álvaro Cepero (Spain) Juan Lebrón	6–2 / 6–2	(Portugal) Diogo Rocha (Portugal) Miguel Oliveira	(Brazil) Bruno Nakid (Brazil) Lucas da Cunha (Brazil) João Pedro Flores (Brazil) Stefano Flores	(Spain) Alejandra Salazar (Spain) Marta Marrero	6–3 / 6–2	(Spain) Gemma Triay (Spain) Lucía Sainz	(Spain) Elisabet Amatriain (Spain) Patricia Llaguno (Spain) Majo Sánchez (Spain) Mapi Sánchez
16.	Asunción, Paraguay	29 October – 4 November 2018	(Spain) Alejandro Galán (Spain) Juan Lebrón	W.O.	(Spain) Javi Ruiz (Spain) Uri Botello	(Brazil) Lucas Bergamini (Brazil) Lucas Campagnolo (Argentina) Andrés Britos (Argentina) Juan Manuel Restivo	(Spain) Majo Sánchez (Spain) Mapi Sánchez	6–4 / 7–5	(Spain) Gemma Triay (Spain) Lucía Sainz	(Spain) Alejandra Salazar (Spain) Marta Marrero (Spain) Patricia Llaguno
FIP Pairs World Cup
17.	Kuwait City, Kuwait	1 – 9 November 2025	(Spain) Alejandro Galán (Argentina) Federico Chingotto	2–6 / 7–5 / 6–2	(Argentina) Agustín Tapia (Spain) Arturo Coello	(Spain) Jon Sanz (Spain) Paquito Navarro (Spain) Coki Nieto (Spain) Mike Yanguas	(Spain) Ariana Sánchez (Spain) Paula Josemaría	6–3 / 6–3	(Argentina) Delfina Brea (Spain) Gemma Triay	(Spain) Marta Ortega (Spain) Tamara Icardo (Spain) Andrea Ustero (Portugal) Sofia Araújo

== Wins by player ==
Men's

Player	Titles	Runner-ups
(Argentina) Roberto Gattiker	4 (1992, 1994, 1996, 1998)	0
(Spain) Juani Mieres	3 (2008, 2010, 2014)	2 (2006, 2012)
(Spain) Juan Martín Díaz	3 (2000, 2002, 2004)	1 (1998)
(Argentina) Alejandro Lasaigues	3 (1992, 1994, 1996)	0
(Argentina) Cristian Gutiérrez	3 (1998, 2006, 2012)	0
(Argentina) Hernán Auguste	2 (2000, 2006)	1 (1994)
(Argentina) Fernando Belasteguín	2 (2002, 2004)	0
(Spain) Juan Lebrón	2 (2016, 2018)	0
(Spain) Alejandro Galán	2 (2018, 2025)	0
(Spain) David Losada	1 (2008)	1 (2006)
(Spain) Willy Lahoz	1 (2010)	1 (2014)
(Argentina) Fernando Poggi	1 (2012)	0
(Argentina) Franco Stupaczuk	1 (2013)	0
(Argentina) Martín Di Nenno	1 (2013)	0
(Spain) Matías Díaz	1 (2014)	0
(Spain) Álvaro Cepero	1 (2016)	0
(Argentina) Federico Chingotto	1 (2025)	0

Women's

Player	Titles	Runner-ups
(Spain) Icíar Montes	5 (1998, 2000, 2002, 2004, 2010)	0
(Spain) Carolina Navarro	3 (2000, 2006, 2012)	3 (2002, 2010, 2014)
(Argentina) Paula Eyheraguibel	3 (2004, 2006, 2012)	2 (1996, 2002)
(Argentina) Cecilia Baccigalupo	3 (1992, 1994, 1996)	0
(Spain) Patricia Llaguno	2 (2010, 2014)	2 (2008, 2012)
(Argentina) Adriana Costagliola	2 (1994, 1996)	1 (2000)
(Argentina) Silvana Campus	1 (2012)	1 (2013)
(Spain) Alejandra Salazar	1 (2016)	1 (2010)
(Argentina) Virginia Mazzuchi	1 (1992)	0
(Spain) Araceli Montero	1 (1998)	0
(Brazil) Nekand Berwig	1 (2000)	0
(Spain) Ana Fernández de Osso	1 (2008)	0
(Spain) María Wakonigg	1 (2008)	0
(Argentina) Cecilia Reiter	1 (2012)	0
(Spain) Carla Mesa	1 (2013)	0
(Spain) Clara Siverio	1 (2013)	0
(Spain) Marta Marrero	1 (2016)	0
(Spain) Mapi Sánchez	1 (2018)	0
(Spain) Majo Sánchez	1 (2018)	0
(Spain) Ariana Sánchez	1 (2025)	0
(Spain) Paula Josemaria	1 (2025)	0

== National Team's medal table ==
=== Men's teams ===
Rank	Nation	Gold	Silver	Bronze	Total
1	Argentina	12	5	0	17
2	Spain	5	10	1	16
3	Brazil	0	2	9	11
4	Paraguay	0	0	2	2
4	Portugal	0	0	2	2
4	Uruguay	0	0	2	2
7	France	0	0	1	1
Totals (7 entries)		17	17	17	51

=== Women's ===
Rank	Nation	Gold	Silver	Bronze	Total
1	Spain	10	7	0	17
2	Argentina	8	10	0	18
3	Brazil	0	1	6	7
4	Italy	0	0	4	4
4	Uruguay	0	0	4	4
6	France	0	0	1	1
6	Mexico	0	0	1	1
6	Portugal	0	0	1	1
Totals (8 entries)		18	18	17	53

== See also ==
- Padel
- Padel Pro Tour
- World Padel Tour
- Premier Padel
- International Padel Federation
- List of FIP number 1 ranked padel players
- Padel at the 2023 European Games
- List of Racket Sports
