= 2025 FIP Pairs World Cup =

Padel championships

- Date: 1 – 9 November
- Edition: 18th
- Category: Pairs World Cup
- Prize money: Undisclosed
- Location: Kuwait City, Kuwait
- Venue: Rafa Nadal Academy

Champions
- Men's doubles: (Spain) Alejandro Galán (Argentina) Federico Chingotto
- Women's doubles: (Spain) Ariana Sánchez (Spain) Paula Josemaría

Chronology

The 2025 FIP Pairs World Cup was the fifteenth edition of the premier pairs tournament organized by the International Padel Federation, returning after a seven-year hiatus.

In the women's category, the top two ranked pairs reached the final for the tenth time in 2025. In the title match, Ariana Sánchez and Paula Josemaría defeated the world number ones, Delfina Brea and Gemma Triay, claiming their seventh title of the season.

In the men's category, the top two ranked pairs met in the final for the eleventh time this season. In the battle for the title, Alejandro Galán and Federico Chingotto defeated Agustín Tapia and Arturo Coello in three sets, securing their eighth title of the season.

== Relevant Data ==
=== How it works and effect on rankings ===
Organized by FIP, the FIP Pairs World Cup offers the same ranking points as "Major" tournaments, effectively serving as a fifth "Major," given that the event in Kuwait awards the same points (2,000 for winners and 1,200 for finalists) and the same prize money.

== Seeds ==
Male

Rnk.	Team	FIP Ranking Points
1	(Argentina) Agustín Tapia (Spain) Arturo Coello	40000
2	(Spain) Alejandro Galán (Argentina) Federico Chingotto	29140
3	(Argentina) Franco Stupaczuk (Spain) Juan Lebrón	17010
4	(Spain) Coki Nieto (Spain) Mike Yanguas	14774
5	(Argentina) Leandro Augsburguer (Argentina) Martin Di Nenno	9905
6	(Spain) Jon Sanz (Spain) Paquito Navarro	9870
7	(Spain) Francisco Guerrero (Spain) Momo Gonzalez	7930
8	(Brazil) Lucas Bergamini (Spain) Javi Leal	7905
9	(Spain) Eduardo Alonso (Argentina) Juan Tello	6422
10	(Spain) Javier Barahona (Spain) Javier Garcia Mora	5110
11	(Spain) Alejandro Ruiz (Spain) Juanlu Esbri	4752
12	(Spain) Alejandro Arroyo (United Arab Emirates) Inigo Jofre	4647
13	(Spain) Javier Garrido (Brazil) Lucas Campagnolo	4273
14	(Argentina) Gonzalo Alfonso (Argentina) Sanyo Gutiérrez	4180
15	(Argentina) Alex Chozas (Argentina) Leonel Aguirre	3912
16	(Spain) Jairo Bautista (Argentina) Valentino Libaak	3776

Female

Rnk.	Team	FIP Ranking Points
1	(Argentina) Delfina Brea (Spain) Gemma Triay	36100
2	(Spain) Ariana Sánchez (Spain) Paula Josemaria	29480
3	(Spain) Bea González (Spain) Claudia Fernandéz	23900
4	(Spain) Andrea Ustero (Portugal) Sofia Araújo	13725
5	(Spain) Marta Ortega (Spain) Tamara Icardo	12965
6	(Spain) Alejandra Alonso (Argentina) Claudia Jensen	10485
7	(Spain) Alejandra Salazar (Spain) Martina Calvo	8590
8	(Spain) Marina Guinart (Spain) Veronica Virseda	7740
9	(Argentina) Aranzazu Osoro (Spain) Victoria Iglesias	6545
10	(Spain) Beatriz Caldera (Spain) Carmen Goenaga	6157
11	(Spain) Lucia Sainz (Spain) Raquel Eugenio Barrera	5095
12	(Spain) Jessica Castelló (Spain) Lorena Rufo	5095
13	(Argentina) Martina Fassio Goyeneche (Spain) Patricia Llaguno	4805
14	(Spain) Jimena Velasco (Spain) Marta Barrera	4070
15	(Spain) Araceli Martinez (Italy) Carolina Orsi	3980
16	(Portugal) Ana Catarina Nogueira (Argentina) Virginia Riera	3516

== Head-to-head record between teams ranked in the top 4 during the season ==
=== Man's ===
Record	Coello–Tapia	Galán–Chingotto	Lebrón–Stupaczuk	Coki–Yanguas
Coello–Tapia	—	7–4	4–1	6–0
Galán–Chingotto	4–7	—	5–1	6–0
Lebrón–Stupaczuk	1–4	1–5	—	—
Coki–Yanguas	0–6	0–6	—	—

=== Women's ===
Record	D. Brea–Triay	Ariana–Paula	Gonzalez–Fernandez	Araújo–Ustero	Former Pairs	Araújo–Ortega
D. Brea–Triay	—	7–2	2–6	4–0		3–0
Ariana–Paula	2–7	—	8–1	5–0		1–1
Gonzalez–Fernandez	6–2	1–8	—	—		—
Araújo–Ustero	0–4	0–5	—	—		—
Former Pairs						
Araújo–Ortega	0–3	1–1	—	—		—

Because the Santiago final ended in a draw, it is not counted.

== Draws ==
=== Men's Bracket ===
Round of 32
1	(Spain) Coello / (Argentina) Tapia
Q	(Spain) A. Goñi / (Argentina) L. Capra	1	5
26	(Italy) D. Perino / (Argentina) I. Piotto	6	4
11	(Spain) A. Ruiz / (Spain) J. Esbri	7	6
13	(Spain) J. Garrido / (Brazil) L. Campagnolo	6	6
33	(Italy) F. Dominguez / (Spain) J. Martinez	1	2
Q	(Spain) Á. Amaya / (Spain) P. Amaya	2	1
7	(Spain) F. Guerrero / (Spain) Momo	6	6
5	(Argentina) Di Nenno / (Argentina) L. Augsburger	7	6	6
24	(Spain) D. Sánchez / (Spain) P.G. Rodrigo	6	7	7
38	(Spain) A.R. Martinez / (Argentina) J. Rubini	6	3	6
16	(Spain) J. Bautista / (Argentina) V. Libaak	4	6	3
14	(Argentina) G. Alfonso / (Argentina) Sanyo	6	6	6
40	(Spain) J.L. Gonzalez / (Italy) M. Cassetta	7	2	1
21	(Spain) A. Cepero / (Argentina) E. Torre	1	6
4	(Spain) Coki / (Spain) Yanguas	6	7
3	(Spain) Lebrón / (Argentina) Stupaczuk	6	6
28	(Argentina) M. Arce / (Spain) P. Lijó	4	2
23	(Spain) G. Collado / (Spain) P.H. Alvarez	6	6
12	(Spain) A. Arroyo / (United Arab Emirates) I. Jofre	1	4
9	(Spain) E. Alonso / (Argentina) J. Tello	6	6
Q	(Spain) J. Zamora / (Spain) R. Mendez	4	4
17	(Spain) J.G. Diestro / (Spain) V. Ruiz	4	2
6	(Spain) J. Sanz / (Spain) Paquito	6	6
8	(Spain) J. Leal / (Brazil) L. Bergamini	4	2
25	(Spain) J.J. Casas / (Argentina) M.S. Blasco	6	6
19	(Spain) G. Rubio / (Spain) J. Ruiz	5	2
15	(Argentina) A. Chozas / (Argentina) L. Aguirre	7	6
10	(Spain) J. Barahona / (Spain) J.G. Mora	5	6	4
32	(United Arab Emirates) E. Goenaga / (Spain) L.H. Quesada	7	1	6
20	(Spain) F. Gil / (Argentina) Maxi	1	0
2	(Argentina) Chingotto / (Spain) Galán

Round of 16
1	(Spain) Coello / (Argentina) Tapia	6	6
11	(Spain) A. Ruiz / (Spain) J. Esbri	3	1
13	(Spain) J. Garrido / (Brazil) L. Campagnolo	7	2	2
7	(Spain) F. Guerrero / (Spain) Momo	6	6	6
24	(Spain) D. Sánchez / (Spain) P.G. Rodrigo	6	7
38	(Spain) A.R. Martinez / (Argentina) J. Rubini	4	6
14	(Argentina) G. Alfonso / (Argentina) Sanyo	6	3
4	(Spain) Coki / (Spain) Yanguas	7	6
3	(Spain) Lebrón / (Argentina) Stupaczuk	6	6
23	(Spain) G. Collado / (Spain) P.H. Alvarez	0	2
9	(Spain) E. Alonso / (Argentina) J. Tello	4	3
6	(Spain) J. Sanz / (Spain) Paquito	6	6
25	(Spain) J.J. Casas / (Argentina) M.S. Blasco	5	3
15	(Argentina) A. Chozas / (Spain) L. Aguirre	7	6
32	(United Arab Emirates) E. Goenaga / (Spain) L.H. Quesada	2	4
2	(Argentina) Chingotto / (Spain) Galán	6	6

Quarter-Final
1	(Spain) Coello / (Argentina) Tapia	6	4	6
7	(Spain) F. Guerrero / (Spain) Momo	4	6	3
24	(Spain) D. Sánchez / (Spain) P.G. Rodrigo	2	2
4	(Spain) Coki / (Spain) Yanguas	6	6
3	(Spain) Lebrón / (Argentina) Stupaczuk	2	6	4
6	(Spain) J. Sanz / (Spain) Paquito	6	4	6
15	(Argentina) A. Chozas / (Spain) L. Aguirre	2	4
2	(Argentina) Chingotto / (Spain) Galán	6	6

Semi-Finals
1	(Spain) Coello / (Argentina) Tapia	6	7
4	(Spain) Coki / (Spain) Yanguas	4	6
6	(Spain) J. Sanz / (Spain) Paquito	4	2
2	(Argentina) Chingotto / (Spain) Galán	6	6

Finals
1	(Spain) Coello / (Argentina) Tapia	6	5	2
2	(Argentina) Chingotto / (Spain) Galán	2	7	6

=== Women's Bracket ===
Round of 32
1	(Argentina) D. Brea / (Spain) G. Triay
Bye
20	(Russia) K. Sharifova / (Spain) M. Lobo	2	3
10	(Spain) B. Caldera / (Spain) C. Goenaga	6	6
12	(Spain) J. Castelló / (Spain) L. Rufo	6	6
24	(Spain) Carla Mesa / (Spain) S. Ruiz	0	4
Q	(Spain) A. Cañellas / (Italy) C. Casali	0	2
6	(Spain) A. Alonso / (Argentina) C. Jensen	6	6
7	(Spain) A. Salazar / (Spain) M. Calvo	6	6
19	(Argentina) J. Bidahorria / (Spain) L. Arruabarrena	0	3
22	(France) A. Collombon / (Spain) J. Cabruja	5	5
11	(Spain) L. Sainz / (Spain) R. Barrera	7	7
14	(Spain) M. Barrera / (Spain) J. Velasco	6	6
33	(Spain) A. Moral / (Spain) L. Trella	2	1
Bye
4	(Spain) A. Ustero / (Portugal) S. Araújo
3	(Spain) B. González / (Spain) C. Fernández
Bye
21	(Spain) M.R. Abajo / (Spain) N. Canovas	6	4	6
9	(Argentina) A. Osoro / (Spain) V. Iglesias	4	6	2
16	(Portugal) A. Nogueira / (Argentina) V. Riera	2	4
25	(Spain) N. Aguilar / (Spain) T. Navarro	6	6
30	(Italy) G. Marchetti / (France) L. Godallier	3	4
5	(Spain) M. Ortega / (Spain) T. Icardo	6	6
8	(Spain) M. Guinart / (Spain) V. Virseda	6	6
31	(Spain) E. Carnicero / (Spain) P. Martinez	3	2
26	(Spain) L. Manquillo / (Spain) L. Luján	2	7	5
15	(Spain) A. Martinez / (Italy) C. Orsi	6	6	7
13	(Argentina) M. Goyeneche / (Spain) P. Llaguno	6	6
29	(Sweden) C. Navarro / (Spain) M. Merino	2	2
Bye
2	(Spain) A. Sánchez / (Spain) P. Josemaria

Round of 16
1	(Argentina) D. Brea / (Spain) G. Triay	6	6
10	(Spain) B. Caldera / (Spain) C. Goenaga	2	2
12	(Spain) J. Castelló / (Spain) L. Rufo	3	2
6	(Spain) A. Alonso / (Argentina) C. Jensen	6	6
7	(Spain) A. Salazar / (Spain) M. Calvo	6	6
11	(Spain) L. Sainz / (Spain) R. Barrera	0	2
14	(Spain) M. Barrera / (Spain) J. Velasco	2	3
4	(Spain) A. Ustero / (Portugal) S. Araújo	6	6
3	(Spain) B. González / (Spain) C. Fernández	6	7
21	(Spain) M.R. Abajo / (Spain) N. Canovas	4	6
25	(Spain) N. Aguilar / (Spain) T. Navarro	0	1
5	(Spain) M. Ortega / (Spain) T. Icardo	6	6
8	(Spain) M. Guinart / (Spain) V. Virseda	6	6
15	(Spain) A. Martinez / (Italy) C. Orsi	3	1
13	(Argentina) M. Goyeneche / (Spain) P. Llaguno	6	5	3
2	(Spain) A. Sánchez / (Spain) P. Josemaria	2	7	6

Quarter-Final
1	(Argentina) D. Brea / (Spain) G. Triay	6	6
6	(Spain) A. Alonso / (Argentina) C. Jensen	2	1
7	(Spain) A. Salazar / (Spain) M. Calvo	4	7	2
4	(Spain) A. Ustero / (Portugal) S. Araújo	6	5	6
3	(Spain) B. González / (Spain) C. Fernández	4	1
5	(Spain) M. Ortega / (Spain) T. Icardo	6	6
8	(Spain) M. Guinart / (Spain) V. Virseda	4	3
2	(Spain) A. Sánchez / (Spain) P. Josemaria	6	6

Semi-Finals
1	(Argentina) D. Brea / (Spain) G. Triay	6	7
4	(Spain) A. Ustero / (Portugal) S. Araújo	1	6
5	(Spain) M. Ortega / (Spain) T. Icardo	6	2
2	(Spain) A. Sánchez / (Spain) P. Josemaria	7	6

Finals
1	(Argentina) D. Brea / (Spain) G. Triay	3	3
2	(Spain) A. Sánchez / (Spain) P. Josemaria	6	6

== Results ==
=== First Round ===
Men's

Date	Winners	Score	Opponent	Refs.
3/11/2025	(Spain) Aimar Goñi (Argentina) Lucho Capra	6–3 / 6–1	(Italy) Aris Patiniotis (Spain) Jesus Moya	
3/11/2025	(Italy) Denis Perino (Argentina) Ignacio Piotto	6–4 / 3–6 / 6–4	(Portugal) Miguel Deus (Spain) Nuno Deus	
3/11/2025	(Italy) Facundo Dominguez (Spain) Javier Martinez Vazquez	6–0 / 6–3	(Argentina) Agustín Gutiérez (Chile) Javier Valdes	
3/11/2025	(Spain) Alvaro Melendez Amaya (Spain) Pedro Melendez Amaya	6–1 / 4–6 / 6–4	(Argentina) Federico Mouriño (Argentina) Ramiro Valenzuela	
3/11/2025	(Spain) David Gala Sánchez (Spain) Pablo García Rodrigo	7–5 / 6–4	(Spain) Mario Del Castillo (Spain) Pincho Fernandez	
3/11/2025	(Spain) Alonso Rodriguez (Argentina) Juan Ignacio Rubini	6–3 / 6–4	(Kuwait) Dhari Alansari (Argentina) Federico Chiostri	
3/11/2025	(Spain) Jose Luis Gonzalez (Italy) Marco Cassetta	6–2 / 6–3	(Kuwait) Abdulrahman Alawadhi (Spain) Raúl Marcos Duran	
3/11/2025	(Spain) Alvaro Cepero (Argentina) Eduardo Agustin Torre	6–2 / 7–6	(Spain) Andres Fernandez Lancha (Spain) Ignacio Sager	
3/11/2025	(Argentina) Maximiliano Arce (Spain) Pablo Lijó	6–0 / 5–0 / W.O.	(Spain) Francisco Cabeza (Spain) Teodoro Zapata	
3/11/2025	(Spain) Guillermo Collado (Spain) Pol Hernandez	6–2 / 6–3	(Italy) Flavio Abbate (Spain) Manuel Castaño	
3/11/2025	(Spain) Juan Zamora (Spain) Rafael Mendéz	7–6 / 6–4	(Spain) Emilio Sanchez Chamero (Italy) Enzo Jensen	
3/11/2025	(Spain) Jose García Diestro (Spain) Victor Ruiz	5–7 / 6–3 / 5–1 / W.O.	(Spain) Diego García (Spain) Salvador Oria	
3/11/2025	(Spain) Jose Jimenez Casas (Argentina) Maxi Sanchez Blasco	2–6 / 6–3 / 6–2	(Italy) Alvaro Montiel (Argentina) Juan Cruz Belluati	
3/11/2025	(Spain) Gonzalo Rubio (Spain) Javi Ruiz	7–6 / 6–2	(Spain) Daniel Santigosa (Spain) Marc Sintes	
3/11/2025	(Spain) Enrique Goenaga (Spain) Luis Hernandez Quesada	6–2 / 6–1	(Qatar) Mashari Nawaf (Qatar) Rashed Nawaf	
3/11/2025	(Spain) Francisco Gil Morales (Argentina) Maxi Sánchez	3–6 / 6–2 / 6–4	(Spain) Anton Sans Riola (Spain) Marc Quilez	

Women's

Date	Winners	Score	Opponent	Refs.
4/11/2025	(Russia) Ksenia Sharifova (Spain) Marina Martinez Lobo	6–4 / 6–7 / 6–2	(Spain) Agueda Perez (Spain) Marta Caparros	
4/11/2025	(Spain) Carla Mesa (Spain) Sara Ruiz Soto	6–4 / 6–2	(Spain) Anna Ortiz (Spain) Camila Fassio	
4/11/2025	(Spain) Ariadna Cañellas (Italy) Carlotta Casali	6–2 / 6–2	(Spain) Xenia Clasca (Kuwait) Zenab Sarkhoo	
4/11/2025	(Argentina) Julieta Bidahorria (Spain) Lara Arruabarrena	7–6 / 3–6 / 6–1	(Spain) Marta Talavan (Spain) Sofía Saiz Vallejo	
4/11/2025	(France) Alix Collombon (Spain) Jana Montes Cabruja	6–3 / 7–6	(Spain) Lucia Martinez Gomez (Spain) Nuria Rodriguez	
4/11/2025	(Spain) Amanda Lopez Moral (Spain) Lucía García Trella	6–7 / 6–3 / 7–6	(Spain) Natividad Lopez Díaz (Spain) Rebeca Lopez	
4/11/2025	(Spain) Laia Rodriguez Abajo (Spain) Noa Canovas	6–2 / 6–0	(Spain) Aida Martinez San Juan (Spain) Ana Dominguez Gracia	
4/11/2025	(Spain) Noemi Aguilar (Spain) Teresa Navarro	6–4 / 2–6 / 6–1	(Italy) Giulia Dal Pozzo (Spain) Sandra Bellver	
4/11/2025	(Italy) Giorgia Marchetti (France) Lea Godallier	6–2 / 6–2	(Argentina) Daiara Valenzuela (Brazil) Raquel Piltcher	
4/11/2025	(Spain) Esther Carnicero (Spain) Patricia Martinez Fortun	6–1 / 6–7 / 6–3	(Spain) Barbara Las Heras (Spain) Julia Polo Bautista	
4/11/2025	(Spain) Laura Lujan Rodriguez (Spain) Letizia Manquillo	6–2 / 6–4	(Spain) Marta Arellano (Spain) Marta Borrero	
4/11/2025	(Sweden) Carolina Navarro Björk (Spain) Melania Merino	6–1 / 6–0	(Kuwait) Dalal Al Qenaei (Spain) Eugenia Guimet	

=== Round of 32 ===
Men's

Date	Winners	Score	Opponent	Refs.
4/11/2025	(Argentina) Agustín Tapia (Spain) Arturo Coello	6–1 / 7–5	(Spain) Aimar Goñi (Argentina) Lucho Capra	
4/11/2025	(Spain) Aléx Ruiz (Spain) Juanlu Esbri	7–6 / 6–4	(Italy) Denis Perino (Argentina) Ignacio Piotto	
4/11/2025	(Spain) Javi Garrido (Brazil) Lucas Campagnolo	6–1 / 6–2	(Italy) Facundo Dominguez (Spain) Javier Martinez Vazquez	
4/11/2025	(Spain) Francisco Guerrero (Spain) Momo Gonzalez	6–2 / 6–1	(Spain) Alvaro Melendez Amaya (Spain) Pedro Melendez Amaya	
4/11/2025	(Spain) David Gala Sánchez (Spain) Pablo García Rodrigo	6–7 / 7–6 / 7–6	(Argentina) Leandro Augsburger (Argentina) Martin Di Nenno	
4/11/2025	(Spain) Alonso Rodriguez (Argentina) Juan Ignacio Rubini	6–4 / 3–6 / 6–3	(Spain) Jairo Bautista (Argentina) Valentino Libaak	
5/11/2025	(Argentina) Gonzalo Alfonso (Argentina) Sanyo Gutiérrez	6–7 / 6–2 / 6–1	(Spain) Jose Luis Gonzalez (Italy) Marco Cassetta	
5/11/2025	(Spain) Coki Nieto (Spain) Mike Yanguas	6–1 / 7–6	(Spain) Alvaro Cepero (Argentina) Eduardo Agustin Torre	
4/11/2025	(Argentina) Franco Stupaczuk (Spain) Juan Lebrón	6–4 / 6–2	(Argentina) Maximiliano Arce (Spain) Pablo Lijó	
4/11/2025	(Spain) Guillermo Collado (Spain) Pol Hernandez	6–1 / 6–4	(Spain) Alex Arroyo (United Arab Emirates) Iñigo Jofre	
5/11/2025	(Spain) Eduardo Alonso (Argentina) Juan Tello	6–4 / 6–4	(Spain) Juan Zamora (Spain) Rafael Mendéz	
5/11/2025	(Spain) Jon Sanz (Spain) Paquito Navarro	6–4 / 6–2	(Spain) Jose García Diestro (Spain) Victor Ruiz	
5/11/2025	(Spain) Jose Jimenez Casas (Argentina) Maxi Sanchez Blasco	6–4 / 6–2	(Spain) Javi Leal (Brazil) Lucas Bergamini	
5/11/2025	(Argentina) Alex Chozas (Argentina) Leonel Aguirre	7–5 / 6–2	(Spain) Gonzalo Rubio (Spain) Javi Ruiz	
5/11/2025	(Spain) Enrique Goenaga (Spain) Luis Hernandez Quesada	7–5 / 1–6 / 6–4	(Spain) Javier Barahona (Spain) Javier García Mora	
5/11/2025	(Spain) Alejandro Galán (Argentina) Federico Chingotto	6–1 / 6–0	(Spain) Francisco Gil Morales (Argentina) Maxi Sánchez	

Women's

Date	Winners	Score	Opponent	Refs.
5/11/2025	(Spain) Beatriz Caldera (Spain) Carmen Goenaga	6–2 / 6–3	(Russia) Ksenia Sharifova (Spain) Marina Martinez Lobo	
5/11/2025	(Spain) Jessica Castelló (Spain) Lorena Rufo	6–0 / 6–4	(Spain) Carla Mesa (Spain) Sara Ruiz Soto	
5/11/2025	(Spain) Alejandra Alonso (Argentina) Claudia Jensen	6–0 / 6–2	(Spain) Ariadna Cañellas (Italy) Carlotta Casali	
5/11/2025	(Spain) Alejandra Salazar (Spain) Martina Calvo	6–0 / 6–3	(Argentina) Julieta Bidahorria (Spain) Lara Arruabarrena	
5/11/2025	(Spain) Lucia Sainz (Spain) Raquel Eugenio Barrera	7–5 / 7–5	(France) Alix Collombon (Spain) Jana Montes Cabruja	
5/11/2025	(Spain) Jimena Velasco (Spain) Marta Barrera	6–2 / 6–1	(Spain) Amanda Lopez Moral (Spain) Lucía García Trella	
5/11/2025	(Spain) Laia Rodriguez Abajo (Spain) Noa Canovas	6–4 / 4–6 / 6–2	(Argentina) Aranzazu Osoro (Spain) Victoria Iglesias	
5/11/2025	(Spain) Noemi Aguilar (Spain) Teresa Navarro	6–2 / 6–4	(Portugal) Ana Catarina Nogueira (Argentina) Virginia Riera	
5/11/2025	(Spain) Marta Ortega (Spain) Tamara Icardo	6–3 / 6–4	(Italy) Giorgia Marchetti (France) Lea Godallier	
5/11/2025	(Spain) Marina Guinart (Spain) Verónica Virseda	6–3 / 6–2	(Spain) Esther Carnicero (Spain) Patricia Martinez Fortun	
5/11/2025	(Spain) Araceli Martinez (Italy) Carolina Orsi	6–2 / 6–7 / 7–5	(Spain) Laura Lujan Rodriguez (Spain) Letizia Manquillo	
5/11/2025	(Argentina) Martina Fassio Goyeneche (Spain) Patricia Llaguno	6–2 / 6–2	(Sweden) Carolina Navarro Björk (Spain) Melania Merino	

=== Round of 16 ===
Men's

Date	Winners	Score	Opponent	Refs.
6/11/2025	(Argentina) Agustín Tapia (Spain) Arturo Coello	6–3 / 6–1	(Spain) Aléx Ruiz (Spain) Juanlu Esbri	
6/11/2025	(Spain) Francisco Guerrero (Spain) Momo Gonzalez	6–7 / 6–2 / 6–2	(Spain) Javi Garrido (Brazil) Lucas Campagnolo	
6/11/2025	(Spain) David Gala Sánchez (Spain) Pablo García Rodrigo	6–4 / 7–6	(Spain) Alonso Rodriguez (Argentina) Juan Ignacio Rubini	
6/11/2025	(Spain) Coki Nieto (Spain) Mike Yanguas	7–6 / 6–3	(Argentina) Gonzalo Alfonso (Argentina) Sanyo Gutiérrez	
6/11/2025	(Argentina) Franco Stupaczuk (Spain) Juan Lebrón	6–0 / 6–2	(Spain) Guillermo Collado (Spain) Pol Hernandez	
6/11/2025	(Spain) Jon Sanz (Spain) Paquito Navarro	6–4 / 6–3	(Spain) Eduardo Alonso (Argentina) Juan Tello	
6/11/2025	(Argentina) Alex Chozas (Argentina) Leonel Aguirre	7–5 / 6–3	(Spain) Jose Jimenez Casas (Argentina) Maxi Sanchez Blasco	
6/11/2025	(Spain) Alejandro Galán (Argentina) Federico Chingotto	6–2 / 6–4	(Spain) Enrique Goenaga (Spain) Luis Hernandez Quesada	

Women's

Date	Winners	Score	Opponent	Refs.
6/11/2025	(Argentina) Delfina Brea (Spain) Gemma Triay	6–2 / 6–2	(Spain) Beatriz Caldera (Spain) Carmen Goenaga	
6/11/2025	(Spain) Alejandra Alonso (Argentina) Claudia Jensen	6–3 / 6–2	(Spain) Jessica Castelló (Spain) Lorena Rufo	
6/11/2025	(Spain) Alejandra Salazar (Spain) Martina Calvo	6–0 / 6–2	(Spain) Lucia Sainz (Spain) Raquel Eugenio Barrera	
6/11/2025	(Spain) Andrea Ustero (Portugal) Sofia Araújo	6–2 / 6–3	(Spain) Jimena Velasco (Spain) Marta Barrera	
6/11/2025	(Spain) Bea González (Spain) Claudia Fernandéz	6–4 / 7–6	(Spain) Laia Rodriguez Abajo (Spain) Noa Canovas	
6/11/2025	(Spain) Marta Ortega (Spain) Tamara Icardo	6–0 / 6–1	(Spain) Noemi Aguilar (Spain) Teresa Navarro	
6/11/2025	(Spain) Marina Guinart (Spain) Verónica Virseda	6–3 / 6–1	(Spain) Araceli Martinez (Italy) Carolina Orsi	
6/11/2025	(Spain) Ariana Sánchez (Spain) Paula Josemaría	2–6 / 7–5 / 6–3	(Argentina) Martina Fassio Goyeneche (Spain) Patricia Llaguno	

=== Quarter-Finals ===
Men's

Date	Winners	Score	Opponent	Refs.
7/11/2025	(Argentina) Agustín Tapia (Spain) Arturo Coello	6–4 / 4–6 / 6–3	(Spain) Francisco Guerrero (Spain) Momo Gonzalez	
7/11/2025	(Spain) Coki Nieto (Spain) Mike Yanguas	6–2 / 6–2	(Spain) David Gala Sánchez (Spain) Pablo García Rodrigo	
7/11/2025	(Spain) Jon Sanz (Spain) Paquito Navarro	6–2 / 4–6 / 6–4	(Argentina) Franco Stupaczuk (Spain) Juan Lebrón	
7/11/2025	(Spain) Alejandro Galán (Argentina) Federico Chingotto	6–2 / 6–4	(Argentina) Alex Chozas (Argentina) Leonel Aguirre	

Women's

Date	Winners	Score	Opponent	Refs.
7/11/2025	(Argentina) Delfina Brea (Spain) Gemma Triay	6–2 / 6–1	(Spain) Alejandra Alonso (Argentina) Claudia Jensen	
7/11/2025	(Spain) Andrea Ustero (Portugal) Sofia Araújo	6–4 / 5–7 / 6–2	(Spain) Alejandra Salazar (Spain) Martina Calvo	
7/11/2025	(Spain) Marta Ortega (Spain) Tamara Icardo	6–4 / 6–1	(Spain) Bea González (Spain) Claudia Fernandéz	
7/11/2025	(Spain) Ariana Sánchez (Spain) Paula Josemaría	6–4 / 6–3	(Spain) Marina Guinart (Spain) Verónica Virseda	

=== Semi-Finals ===
Men's

Date	Winners	Score	Opponent	Refs.
8/11/2025	(Argentina) Agustín Tapia (Spain) Arturo Coello	6–4 / 7–6	(Spain) Coki Nieto (Spain) Mike Yanguas	
8/11/2025	(Spain) Alejandro Galán (Argentina) Federico Chingotto	6–4 / 6–2	(Spain) Jon Sanz (Spain) Paquito Navarro	

Women's

Date	Winners	Score	Opponent	Refs.
8/11/2025	(Argentina) Delfina Brea (Spain) Gemma Triay	6–1 / 7–6	(Spain) Andrea Ustero (Portugal) Sofia Araújo	
8/11/2025	(Spain) Ariana Sánchez (Spain) Paula Josemaría	7–6 / 6–2	(Spain) Marta Ortega (Spain) Tamara Icardo	

=== Finals ===
Men's

Date	Winners	Score	Opponent	Refs.
9/11/2025	(Spain) Alejandro Galán (Argentina) Federico Chingotto	2–6 / 7–5 / 6–2	(Argentina) Agustín Tapia (Spain) Arturo Coello	

Women's

Date	Winners	Score	Opponent	Refs.
9/11/2025	(Spain) Ariana Sánchez (Spain) Paula Josemaría	6–3 / 6–3	(Argentina) Delfina Brea (Spain) Gemma Triay	
