= 2018 FIP World Padel National Pairs Championships =

FIP Pairs World Championship tournament held in Asunción, Paraguay

- Date: 29 October – 4 November
- Edition: 17th
- Category: World Pairs Championship
- Location: Asunción, Paraguay

Champions
- Men's doubles: (Spain) Alejandro Galán (Spain) Juan Lebrón
- Women's doubles: (Spain) Majo Sánchez (Spain) Mapi Sánchez

Chronology
Previous
Euskadi Open
(WPT)
Next
Argentina Master
(WPT)

The 2018 FIP World Padel National Pairs Championship was the sixteenth edition of the world doubles tournament organized by the FIP, the governing body for international padel. Both the men's and women's events were held concurrently with the national team's world championships, and for the sixth time, participation was restricted to pairs representing the same country.

In the women's category, the world's number 1 and number 2 ranked pairs, continued their strong form from the World Padel Tour tournaments, reaching the final with a 2–2 tie in their head-to-head record. In the decisive match, twins Majo and Mapi Sánchez, playing in their twelfth final of the year, defeated Gemma Triay and Lucia Sainz, securing their sixth title of the season and becoming world champions in the doubles category for the first time.

In the men's category, for the seventh time since 2006 (with the exception of 2012), the vast majority of the top-ranked players chose not to compete in the world doubles championship, opening the door for the two best-ranked pairs among the entrants to reach the final. In the battle for the title, Alejandro Galán and Juan Lebrón defeated Javi Ruiz and Uri Botello via walkover. This marked Galán's first world doubles championship, while Lebrón successfully defended the title he had won in 2016. This was the first title and tournament together for Galán and Lebrón as a pair, a partnership that would go on to dominate the World Padel Tour circuit from 2020 to 2022.

== Head-to-head record between teams ranked in the top 4 during the season ==
=== Men's ===
Record	Maxi–Sanyo	Lima–Paquito Navarro	Galán–M. Díaz	Gutiérrez–Stupaczuk	Former Pairs	J.M. Díaz–Paquito	Belasteguín–Lima	Lima–M. Jardim	Lima–Silingo
Maxi–Sanyo	—	—	2–3	3–2		4–0	0–1	—	—
Lima–Paquito	—	—	—	1–0		—	—	—	—
Galán–M. Díaz	3–2	—	—	2–2		1–2	0–1	—	—
Gutiérrez–Stupaczuk	2–3	0–1	2–2	—		—	0–1	1–0	—
Former Pairs									
J.M. Díaz–Paquito	0–4	—	2–1	—		—	0–2	—	—
Belasteguín–Lima	1–0	—	1–0	1–0		2–0	—	—	—
Lima–M. Jardim	—	—	—	0–1		—	—	—	—
Lima–Silingo	—	—	—	—		—	—	—	—

=== Women's ===
Record	Majo–Mapi	Marrero–Salazar	Triay–Sainz	Ariana–Ortega	Former Pairs	Amatriain–Llaguno
Majo–Mapi	—	4–4	4–3	4–1		6–0
Marrero–Salazar	4–4	—	4–5	2–0		1–0
Triay–Sainz	3–4	5–4	—	2–0		3–1
Ariana–Ortega	1–4	0–2	0–2	—		3–1
Former Pairs						
Amatriain–Llaguno	0–6	0–1	1–3	1–3		—

== Draws ==
=== Men's Bracket ===
Round of 32
1	(Spain) Galán / (Spain) Lebrón	6	6
(Portugal) B. Bastos / (Portugal) S. Mendonça	3	4
(Mexico) F. Mujica / (Mexico) P. Acevedo	6	1
(Sweden) A. Andersson / (Sweden) P. Figueroa	0	0	*
(France) M. Lapoug / (France) M. Moreaue	7	6
(Sweden) P. Bonfre / (Sweden) V. Stiern	6	4
(Belgium) F. Gardier / (Belgium) G. Crasson	1	4
(Paraguay) D. González / (Paraguay) S. Miltos	6	6
(Brazil) L. Bergamini / (Brazil) L. Campagnolo	*
(Chile) C. Santibañez / (Chile) F. González
(Belgium) A. Witmeur / (Belgium) L. Montoysi	6	6	3
(Sweden) C. Knutsson / (Sweden) O. Brode	4	7	3
(Italy) E. Burzi / (Italy) M. Nicoletti	3	6	5
(France) A. Maigret / (France) B. Tison	6	4	7
(Portugal) M. Oliveira / (Portugal) V. Pascoal	6	6
(Chile) A. Izurieta / (Chile) L. Becerra	4	3
(Italy) D. Cattaneo / (Italy) S. Cremona	6	6
(Belgium) J. Gala / (Belgium) N. Braet	4	2
(France) B. Blanque / (France) J. Bergeron	4	4
(Italy) A. Britos / (Italy) J. Restivo	6	6
(Chile) D. Bentjerodt / (Chile) S. Muñoz	7	6
(Chile) C. Panske / (Chile) J. Messerschmidt	6	2
(United Kingdom) C. Murphy / (United Kingdom) S. Farquharson	1	2
(Brazil) F. Gomes / (Brazil) M. Jardim	6	6
(Uruguay) A. Trindade / (Uruguay) D. Romero	4	2
(Portugal) F. Neves / (Portugal) R. Martins	6	6
(Paraguay) H. Adorno / (Paraguay) R. Gomez	4	4
(Uruguay) D. Ramos / (Uruguay) W. Ramos
(France) J. Scatena / (France) R. Haziza	6	6
(Netherlands) J. Snellink / (Netherlands) S. Nijholt	4	4
(Portugal) D. Schaefer / (Portugal) J. Bastos	5	2
(Spain) J. Ruiz / (Spain) U. Botello	7	6

Round of 16
1	(Spain) Galán / (Spain) Lebrón	7	6
(Sweden) A. Andersson / (Sweden) P. Figueroa	5	2
(France) M. Lapoug / (France) M. Moreaue	4	4
(Paraguay) D. González / (Paraguay) S. Miltos	6	6
(Brazil) L. Bergamini / (Brazil) L. Campagnolo	6	6
(Sweden) C. Knutsson / (Sweden) O. Brode	0	1
(France) A. Maigret / (France) B. Tison	6	3	7
(Portugal) M. Oliveira / (Portugal) V. Pascoal	3	6	6
(Italy) D. Cattaneo / (Italy) S. Cremona
(Italy) A. Britos / (Italy) J. Restivo	*
(Chile) D. Bentjerodt / (Chile) S. Muñoz	2	2
(Brazil) F. Gomes / (Brazil) M. Jardim	6	6
(Portugal) F. Neves / (Portugal) R. Martins	4	6	6
(Uruguay) D. Ramos / (Uruguay) W. Ramos	6	3	2
(France) J. Scatena / (France) R. Haziza	1	2
2	(Spain) J. Ruiz / (Spain) U. Botello	6	6

Quarter-Final
1	(Spain) Galán / (Spain) Lebrón	6	6
(Paraguay) D. González / (Paraguay) S. Miltos	2	2
(Brazil) L. Bergamini / (Brazil) L. Campagnolo	*
(France) A. Maigret / (France) B. Tison
(Italy) A. Britos / (Italy) J. Restivo	6	6
(Brazil) F. Gomes / (Brazil) M. Jardim	4	4
(Portugal) F. Neves / (Portugal) R. Martins	3	1
2	(Spain) J. Ruiz / (Spain) U. Botello	6	6

Semi-Finals
1	(Spain) Galán / (Spain) Lebrón	6	6
(Brazil) L. Bergamini / (Brazil) L. Campagnolo	2	4
(Italy) A. Britos / (Italy) J. Restivo	6	3	0
2	(Spain) J. Ruiz / (Spain) U. Botello	3	6	6

Finals
1	(Spain) Galán / (Spain) Lebrón	*
2	(Spain) J. Ruiz / (Spain) U. Botello

=== Women's Bracket ===
Round of 32
1	(Spain) Majo / (Spain) Mapi	6	6
(Belgium) E. Wyckaert / (Belgium) M. Maligo	0	1
(Italy) S. D´Ambrogio / (Italy) V. Tommasi	6	6
(Mexico) A. Cabrejas / (Mexico) E. Escobar	2	4
(Argentina) D. Brea / (Argentina) J. Bidahorria	6	6
(Netherlands) C. Dekker / (Netherlands) T. Van Dinteren	1	1
(Belgium) A. Berenger / (Belgium) H. Wyckaert
(Mexico) L. Hernández / (Mexico) N. Blanco
(France) A. Collombon / (France) J. Ginier	6	6
(Portugal) M. Fernandes / (Portugal) M. Afonso	1	1
(Argentina) D. Niella / (Argentina) G. Pérez	3	1
(Portugal) A.C. Nogueira / (Portugal) F. Mendonça
(Brazil) A. De Barros / (Brazil) G. Barreto	7	6
(Paraguay) I. Larramendia / (Paraguay) L. Calderini	6	4
(Brazil) C. Oliveira / (Brazil) M. Schuck	1	3
3	(Spain) A. Salazar / (Spain) M. Marrero	6	6
4	(Spain) E. Amatriain / (Spain) P. Llaguno	6	6
(Sweden) A. Svedennhov / (Sweden) B. Soleymani	0	0
(United States) B. Salcedo / (United States) N. Dingwall	1	0
(Argentina) S. Campus / (Argentina) V. Riera	6	6
(Argentina) N. Brito / (Argentina) V. Zoya	6	6
(France) A. Cassanova / (France) M. Vo	2	1
(Brazil) M. Altmayer / (Brazil) R. Masseron	4	6	4
(Portugal) H. Medeiros / (Portugal) S. Araújo	6	3	6
(France) L. Clergue / (France) L. Godallier	6	6
(United States) A. Magrini / (United States) N. Debiasi	0	3
(Brazil) F. Abarzúa / (Brazil) S. Lenz	3	3
(Uruguay) C. Fernández / (Uruguay) M. Alaga	6	6
(Portugal) I. Conde / (Portugal) P. Ribeiro	1	0
(Italy) C. Pappacena / (Italy) G. Sussarello	6	6
(France) G. Sorel / (France) M. Martin	0	0
2	(Spain) Gemma / (Spain) L. Sainz	6	6

Round of 16
1	(Spain) Majo / (Spain) Mapi	6	6
(Italy) S. D´Ambrogio / (Italy) V. Tommasi	0	1
(Argentina) D. Brea / (Argentina) J. Bidahorria	6	6
(Belgium) A. Berenger / (Belgium) H. Wyckaert	1	1
(France) A. Collombon / (France) J. Ginier	6	4
(Portugal) A.C. Nogueira / (Portugal) F. Mendonça	7	6
(Brazil) A. De Barros / (Brazil) G. Barreto
3	(Spain) A. Salazar / (Spain) M. Marrero	*
4	(Spain) E. Amatriain / (Spain) P. Llaguno	6	6	6
(Argentina) S. Campus / (Argentina) V. Riera	7	4	1
(Argentina) N. Brito / (Argentina) V. Zoya	4	6
(Portugal) H. Medeiros / (Portugal) S. Araújo	6	7
(France) L. Clergue / (France) L. Godallier	6	6
(Uruguay) C. Fernández / (Uruguay) M. Alaga	3	3
(Italy) C. Pappacena / (Italy) G. Sussarello'	0	3
2	(Spain) Gemma / (Spain) L. Sainz	6	6

Quarter-Final
1	(Spain) Majo / (Spain) Mapi
(Argentina) D. Brea / (Argentina) J. Bidahorria
(Portugal) A.C. Nogueira / (Portugal) F. Mendonça	2	3
3	(Spain) A. Salazar / (Spain) M. Marrero	6	6
4	(Spain) E. Amatriain / (Spain) P. Llaguno	6	6
(Portugal) H. Medeiros / (Portugal) S. Araújo	3	4
(France) L. Clergue / (France) L. Godallier	2	2
2	(Spain) Gemma / (Spain) L. Sainz	6	6

Semi-Finals
1	(Spain) Majo / (Spain) Mapi	7	6
3	(Spain) A. Salazar / (Spain) M. Marrero	6	2
4	(Spain) E. Amatriain / (Spain) P. Llaguno	6	3
2	(Spain) Gemma / (Spain) L. Sainz	7	6

Finals
1	(Spain) Majo / (Spain) Mapi	6	7
2	(Spain) Gemma / (Spain) L. Sainz	4	5

== Results ==
=== First Round ===
Men's
Date	Winners	Score	Opponent	Ref.
30/10/2018	(Portugal) Bernardo Bastos (Portugal) Sebastiao Mendonça	6–0 / 6–4	(Netherlands) Marcel Bogaart (Netherlands) Wouter Van der Ridden	
30/10/2018	(Mexico) Fabián Mujica (Mexico) Pablo Acevedo	6–4 / 6–3	(Germany) Darek Nowicki (Germany) Oliver Schworer	
30/10/2018	(Sweden) Anton Andersson (Sweden) Pablo Figueroa	7–6 / 6–4	(Paraguay) Fernando Lavall (Paraguay) José Mongelo	
30/10/2018	(France) Mathieu Lapouge (France) Maxime Moreau	6–3 / 6–3	(Germany) Fabian Schmidt (Germany) Tim Zeitvogel	
30/10/2018	(Sweden) Pierre Bonfre (Sweden) Viktor Stiern	6–2 / 2–0 / W.O.	(Germany) Christian Bonkhe (Germany) Lennart Samuelsen	
30/10/2018	(Belgium) François Gardier (Belgium) Guillaume Crasson	Unknown	(Mexico) Eduardo Salas (Mexico) Mauricio López	
30/10/2018	(Paraguay) Diego González (Paraguay) Samuel Miltos	6–0 / 6–2	(Australia) Benjamin Dalley (Australia) Kelvin Orsi	
30/10/2018	(Chile) Claudio Santibañez (Chile) Fernando González	6–2 / 6–2	(United Kingdom) Alfonso Patacho (United Kingdom) John Leach	
30/10/2018	(Belgium) Alec Witmeur (Belgium) Laurent Montoysi	6–4 / 7–6	(Netherlands) Berend Boer (Netherlands) Peter Bruijsten	
30/10/2018	(Sweden) Calle Knutsson (Sweden) Ola Broden	6–2 / 7–5	(Paraguay) José Benítez (Paraguay) Matías Fernández	
30/10/2018	(Italy) Enrico Burzi (Italy) Matías Nicoletti	6–2 / 6–1	(Australia) Daniel Mollica (Australia) Gareth Keating	
30/10/2018	(France) Adrien Maigret (France) Benjamin Tison	6–4 / 6–3	(United Kingdom) Ryan Wyatt (United Kingdom) Sam Jones	
30/10/2018	(Portugal) Miguel Oliveira (Portugal) Vasco Pascoal	6–0 / 7–5	(Brazil) Julio Julianoti (Brazil) Stefano Flores	
30/10/2018	(Chile) Andrés Izurieta (Chile) Luis Alberto Becerra	W.O.	(Argentina) Agustin Gutiérrez (Argentina) Santiago Frugoni	
30/10/2018	(Italy) Daniele Cattaneo (Italy) Simone Cremona	6–3 / 6–2	(Mexico) Carlos Dopico (Mexico) Sebastián Lerdo	
30/10/2018	(Belgium) Jeremy Gala (Belgium) Nick Braet	7–6 / 6–3	(Mexico) Carlos De la Peña (Mexico) Rodrigo Montoya	
30/10/2018	(France) Bastien Blanque (France) Johan Bergeron	6–1 / 7–6	(Italy) Bruno Michele (Italy) Luca Mezzetti	
30/10/2018	(Italy) Andrés Britos (Italy) Juan Manuel Restivo	6–2 / 6–1	(United Kingdom) Ben Gudzelak (United Kingdom) Nikki Roenn	
30/10/2018	(Chile) Diego Bentjerodt (Chile) Sebastián Muñoz	6–1 / 6–3	(Netherlands) Pjotr Van Dalfsen (Netherlands) Sven Boele	
30/10/2018	(Chile) Claudius Panske (Chile) Jonas Messerschmidt	W.O.	(Argentina) Cristian Ozán (Argentina) Leonel Aguirre	
30/10/2018	(United Kingdom) Christian Medina Murphy (United Kingdom) Sandy Farquharson	6–4 / 6–7 / 6–4	(Paraguay) Guillermo Guerreño (Paraguay) Rubén Duarte	
30/10/2018	(Brazil) Francisco Gomes (Brazil) Marcello Jardim	6–1 / 6–1	(Uruguay) Agustin Caorsi (Uruguay) Raúl Grela	
30/10/2018	(Uruguay) André Trindade (Uruguay) Daniel Romero	6–2 / 3–6 / 6–0	(Chile) Daniel Salinas (Chile) Mario Galindo	
30/10/2018	(Portugal) Francisco Neves (Portugal) Ricardo Martins	6–0 / 6–0	(Australia) Attor Aspiazu (Australia) Ross Taylor	
30/10/2018	(Paraguay) Horacio Adorno (Paraguay) Rodrigo Gomez	6–4 / 6–3	(Belgium) Jerome Peeters (Belgium) Laurent Jeuniaux	
30/10/2018	(Uruguay) Diego Ramos (Uruguay) Walter Ramos	6–4 / 6–2	(Paraguay) Marcelo Gimenez (Paraguay) Rodrigo Armoa	
30/10/2018	(France) Jeremy Scatena (France) Robin Haziza	6–3 / 6–0	(Uruguay) Higor Ensslin (Uruguay) Valentin Piastri	
30/10/2018	(Netherlands) Joost Snellink (Netherlands) Sido Nijholt	Unknown	(Australia) Jarek Jozwiak (Australia) Matthew Barrelle	
30/10/2018	(Portugal) Diogo Schaefer (Portugal) João Bastos	6–2 / 6–2	(Sweden) Andreas Palsson (Sweden) Bobby Seger	

Women's
Date	Winners	Score	Opponent	Ref.
30/10/2018	(Belgium) Elizabeth Wyckaert (Belgium) Marie Maligo	6–3 / 6–7 / 7–6	(Chile) Catalina Obretch (Chile) Sofía Quezada	
30/10/2018	(Italy) Sara D´Ambrogio (Italy) Valentina Tommasi	6–2 / 6–3	(Netherlands) Mena Smolders (Netherlands) Sabine Schuttellaar	
30/10/2018	(Mexico) Ana María Cabrejas (Mexico) Elizabeth Escobar	6–1 / 6–4	(Finland) Marsa Laukkoski (Finland) Minna Torkki	
30/10/2018	(Argentina) Delfina Brea (Argentina) Julieta Bidahorria	6–0 / 6–2	(Netherlands) Chayenne Ewijk (Netherlands) Rosalie Van de Hoek	
30/10/2018	(Netherlands) Cynthia Dekker (Netherlands) Tess Van Dinteren	7–5 / 6–2	(Belgium) Jana Bonnarens (Belgium) Shana Oyen	
30/10/2018	(Belgium) Alexandra Berenger (Belgium) Helena Wyckaert	Unknown	(Mexico) Camila Ramme (Mexico) Cinthya Millan	
30/10/2018	(Mexico) Laura Hernández (Mexico) Natalia Blanco	6–0 / 6–1	(Finland) Kati Saariniemi (Netherlands) Veera Nurm	
30/10/2018	(France) Alix Collombon (France) Jessica Ginier	6–1 / 6–1	(Sweden) Anna Akerberg (Sweden) Emmie Ekdahl	
30/10/2018	(Portugal) Margarida Fernandes (Portugal) Marina Afonso	7–5 / 6–2	(Finland) Inka Kuusniemi (Finland) Patricia Miro Bussman	
30/10/2018	(Portugal) Ana Catarina Nogueira (Portugal) Filipa Mendonça	6–4 / 6–0	(Sweden) Antonette Andersson (Sweden) Ebba Stedt	
30/10/2018	(Argentina) Daniela Niella (Argentina) Sol Gimena Pérez	6–2 / 6–4	(Belgium) Caroline Bailly (Belgium) Laura Bernard	
30/10/2018	(Brazil) Alessanddra De Barros (Brazil) Gabriela Menna Barreto	6–4 / 6–3	(Mexico) Aranzasu Gallardo (Mexico) Fabiola Talayero	
30/10/2018	(Paraguay) Ivanna Larramendia (Paraguay) Laura Calderini	6–3 / 6–3	(Japan) Ayano Fujiki (Japan) Miki Chinen	
30/10/2018	(Brazil) Cristina Oliveira (Brazil) Manuela Schuck	6–1 / 6–1	(United States) Emiliana Marquez (United States) Mia Sierra	
30/10/2018	(Sweden) Anna Svedennhov (Sweden) Baharak Soleymani	6–2 / 2–6 / 6–4	(Italy) Carolina Orsi (Italy) Martina Camorani	
30/10/2018	(United States) Belén Salcedo (United States) Nancy Dingwall	6–2 / 6–1	(Japan) Mizuki Takita (Japan) Sayaka Yoshimoto	
30/10/2018	(Argentina) Silvana Campus (Argentina) Virginia Riera	6–0 / 6–1	(Paraguay) Jessyca Morales (Paraguay) Lorena Riquelme	
30/10/2018	(Argentina) Nela Brito (Argentina) Valeria Zoya	6–3 / 6–4	(Italy) Alessia La Monaca (Italy) Francesca Zacchini	
30/10/2018	(France) Audry Cassanova (France) Mai Vo	6–2 / 6–2	(Chile) Michelle Coccio (Chile) Paz Orecht	
30/10/2018	(Brazil) Mariana Altmayer (Brazil) Rafaella Masseron	6–7 / 7–6 / 6–1	(Netherlands) Marcella Koek (Netherlands) Milou Ettekoven	
30/10/2018	(Portugal) Helena Medeiros (Portugal) Sofia Araújo	7–6 / 6–3	(Chile) Gabriela Roux (Chile) Giannina Minieri	
30/10/2018	(France) Laura Clergue (France) Lea Godallier	6–0 / 6–0	(Japan) Haruna Misago (Japan) Kuniko Takeguchi	
30/10/2018	(United States) Ana Magrini (United States) Natalia Debiasi	6–2 / 6–4	(Japan) Ai Taira (Japan) Keiko Minami	
30/10/2018	(Brazil) Fernanda Abarzúa (Brazil) Susane Lenz	6–1 / 6–2	(Chile) Macarena Lobo (Chile) Teresa De la Barra	
30/10/2018	(Uruguay) Claudia Fernández (Uruguay) Manuela Alaga	6–4 / 6–1	(Sweden) Alja Behram (Sweden) Matilda Hamlin	
30/10/2018	(Portugal) Ines Conde (Portugal) Patricia Ribeiro	6–2 / 7–6	(United States) Carla Rodríguez (United States) Mariana Talarico	
30/10/2018	(Italy) Chiara Pappacena (Italy) Giulia Sussarello	6–1 / 6–0	(Paraguay) María Paz Escobar (Paraguay) Myriam Rojas	
30/10/2018	(France) Geraldine Sore (France) Melissa Martin	6–2 / 6–2	(Paraguay) Celeste Hernández (Paraguay) Made Madelaire	

=== Round of 32 ===
Men's
Date	Winners	Score	Opponent	Ref.
31/10/2018	(Spain) Alejandro Galán (Spain) Juan Lebrón	6–3 / 6–4	(Portugal) Bernardo Bastos (Portugal) Sebastiao Mendonça	
31/10/2018	(Sweden) Anton Andersson (Sweden) Pablo Figueroa	0–6 / 0–1 / W.O.	(Mexico) Fabián Mujica (Mexico) Pablo Acevedo	
31/10/2018	(France) Mathieu Lapouge (France) Maxime Moreau	7–6 / 6–4	(Sweden) Pierre Bonfre (Sweden) Viktor Stiern	
31/10/2018	(Paraguay) Diego González (Paraguay) Samuel Miltos	6–1 / 6–4	(Belgium) François Gardier (Belgium) Guillaume Crasson	
31/10/2018	(Brazil) Lucas Bergamini (Brazil) Lucas Campagnolo	Unknown	(Chile) Claudio Santibañez (Chile) Fernando González	
31/10/2018	(Sweden) Calle Knutsson (Sweden) Ola Broden	6–4 / 6–7 / 6–3	(Belgium) Alec Witmeur (Belgium) Laurent Montoysi	
31/10/2018	(France) Adrien Maigret (France) Benjamin Tison	6–3 / 4–6 / 7–5	(Italy) Enrico Burzi (Italy) Matías Nicoletti	
31/10/2018	(Portugal) Miguel Oliveira (Portugal) Vasco Pascoal	6–4 / 6–3	(Chile) Andrés Izurieta (Chile) Luis Alberto Becerra	
31/10/2018	(Italy) Daniele Cattaneo (Italy) Simone Cremona	6–4 / 6–2	(Belgium) Jeremy Gala (Belgium) Nick Braet	
31/10/2018	(Italy) Andrés Britos (Italy) Juan Manuel Restivo	6–4 / 6–4	(France) Bastien Blanque (France) Johan Bergeron	
31/10/2018	(Chile) Diego Bentjerodt (Chile) Sebastián Muñoz	7–6 / 6–2	(Chile) Claudius Panske (Chile) Jonas Messerschmidt	
31/10/2018	(Brazil) Francisco Gomes (Brazil) Marcello Jardim	6–1 / 6–2	(United Kingdom) Christian Medina Murphy (United Kingdom) Sandy Farquharson	
31/10/2018	(Portugal) Francisco Neves (Portugal) Ricardo Martins	6–4 / 6–2	(Uruguay) André Trindade (Uruguay) Daniel Romero	
31/10/2018	(Uruguay) Diego Ramos (Uruguay) Walter Ramos	6–4 / 6–4	(Paraguay) Horacio Adorno (Paraguay) Rodrigo Gomez	
31/10/2018	(France) Jeremy Scatena (France) Robin Haziza	6–4 / 6–4	(Netherlands) Joost Snellink (Netherlands) Sido Nijholt	
31/10/2018	(Spain) Javier Ruiz (Spain) Uri Botello	7–5 / 6–2	(Portugal) Diogo Schaefer (Portugal) João Bastos	

Women's
Date	Winners	Score	Opponent	Ref.
31/10/2018	(Spain) Majo Sánchez (Spain) Mapi Sánchez	6–0 / 6–1	(Belgium) Elizabeth Wyckaert (Belgium) Marie Maligo	
31/10/2018	(Italy) Sara D´Ambrogio (Italy) Valentina Tommasi	6–2 / 6–4	(Mexico) Ana María Cabrejas (Mexico) Elizabeth Escobar	
31/10/2018	(Argentina) Delfina Brea (Argentina) Julieta Bidahorria	6–1 / 6–1	(Netherlands) Cynthia Dekker (Netherlands) Tess Van Dinteren	
31/10/2018	(Belgium) Alexandra Berenger (Belgium) Helena Wyckaert	6–2 / 4–6 / 6–2	(Mexico) Laura Hernández (Mexico) Natalia Blanco	
31/10/2018	(France) Alix Collombon (France) Jessica Ginier	6–1 / 6–1	(Portugal) Margarida Fernandes (Portugal) Marina Afonso	
31/10/2018	(Portugal) Ana Catarina Nogueira (Portugal) Filipa Mendonça	6–3 / 6–1	(Argentina) Daniela Niella (Argentina) Sol Gimena Pérez	
31/10/2018	(Brazil) Alessanddra De Barros (Brazil) Gabriela Menna Barreto	7–6 / 6–4	(Paraguay) Ivanna Larramendia (Paraguay) Laura Calderini	
31/10/2018	(Spain) Alejandra Salazar (Spain) Marta Marrero	6–1 / 6–3	(Brazil) Cristina Oliveira (Brazil) Manuela Schuck	
31/10/2018	(Spain) Elisabeth Amatriain (Spain) Patricia Llaguno	6–0 / 6–0	(Sweden) Anna Svedennhov (Sweden) Baharak Soleymani	
31/10/2018	(Argentina) Silvana Campus (Argentina) Virginia Riera	6–1 / 6–0	(United States) Belén Salcedo (United States) Nancy Dingwall	
31/10/2018	(Argentina) Nela Brito (Argentina) Valeria Zoya	6–2 / 6–1	(France) Audry Cassanova (France) Mai Vo	
31/10/2018	(Portugal) Helena Medeiros (Portugal) Sofia Araújo	6–4 / 3–6 / 6–4	(Brazil) Mariana Altmayer (Brazil) Rafaella Masseron	
31/10/2018	(France) Laura Clergue (France) Lea Godallier	6–0 / 6–3	(United States) Ana Magrini (United States) Natalia Debiasi	
31/10/2018	(Uruguay) Claudia Fernández (Uruguay) Manuela Alaga	6–3 / 6–3	(Brazil) Fernanda Abarzúa (Brazil) Susane Lenz	
31/10/2018	(Italy) Chiara Pappacena (Italy) Giulia Sussarello	6–1 / 6–0	(Portugal) Ines Conde (Portugal) Patricia Ribeiro	
31/10/2018	(Spain) Gemma Triay (Spain) Lucia Sainz	6–0 / 6–0	(France) Geraldine Sore (France) Melissa Martin	

=== Round of 16 ===
Men's
Date	Winners	Score	Opponent	Ref.
1/11/2018	(Spain) Alejandro Galán (Spain) Juan Lebrón	7–5 / 6–2	(Sweden) Anton Andersson (Sweden) Pablo Figueroa	
1/11/2018	(Paraguay) Diego González (Paraguay) Samuel Miltos	6–4 / 6–4	(France) Mathieu Lapouge (France) Maxime Moreau	
1/11/2018	(Brazil) Lucas Bergamini (Brazil) Lucas Campagnolo	6–0 / 6–1	(Sweden) Calle Knutsson (Sweden) Ola Broden	
1/11/2018	(France) Adrien Maigret (France) Benjamin Tison	6–3 / 3–6 / 7–6	(Portugal) Miguel Oliveira (Portugal) Vasco Pascoal	
1/11/2018	(Italy) Andrés Britos (Italy) Juan Manuel Restivo	W.O.	(Italy) Daniele Cattaneo (Italy) Simone Cremona	
1/11/2018	(Brazil) Francisco Gomes (Brazil) Marcello Jardim	6–2 / 6–2	(Chile) Diego Bentjerodt (Chile) Sebastián Muñoz	
1/11/2018	(Portugal) Francisco Neves (Portugal) Ricardo Martins	4–6 / 6–3 / 6–2	(Uruguay) Diego Ramos (Uruguay) Walter Ramos	
1/11/2018	(Spain) Javier Ruiz (Spain) Uri Botello	6–1 / 6–2	(France) Jeremy Scatena (France) Robin Haziza	

Women's
Date	Winners	Score	Opponent	Ref.
1/11/2018	(Spain) Majo Sánchez (Spain) Mapi Sánchez	6–0 / 6–1	(Italy) Sara D´Ambrogio (Italy) Valentina Tommasi	
1/11/2018	(Argentina) Delfina Brea (Argentina) Julieta Bidahorria	6–1 / 6–1	(Belgium) Alexandra Berenger (Belgium) Helena Wyckaert	
1/11/2018	(Portugal) Ana Catarina Nogueira (Portugal) Filipa Mendonça	7–6 / 6–4	(France) Alix Collombon (France) Jessica Ginier	
1/11/2018	(Spain) Alejandra Salazar (Spain) Marta Marrero	W.O.	(Brazil) Alessanddra De Barros (Brazil) Gabriela Menna Barreto	
1/11/2018	(Spain) Elisabeth Amatriain (Spain) Patricia Llaguno	6–7 / 6–4 / 6–1	(Argentina) Silvana Campus (Argentina) Virginia Riera	
1/11/2018	(Portugal) Helena Medeiros (Portugal) Sofia Araújo	6–4 7–6	(Argentina) Nela Brito (Argentina) Valeria Zoya	
1/11/2018	(France) Laura Clergue (France) Lea Godallier	6–3 / 6–3	(Uruguay) Claudia Fernández (Uruguay) Manuela Alaga	
1/11/2018	(Spain) Gemma Triay (Spain) Lucia Sainz	6–0 / 6–3	(Italy) Chiara Pappacena (Italy) Giulia Sussarello	

=== Quarter-Finals ===
Men's
Date	Winners	Score	Opponent	Ref.
2/11/2018	(Spain) Alejandro Galán (Spain) Juan Lebrón	6–2 / 6–2	(Paraguay) Diego González (Paraguay) Samuel Miltos	
2/11/2018	(Brazil) Lucas Bergamini (Brazil) Lucas Campagnolo	W.O.	(France) Adrien Maigret (France) Benjamin Tison	
2/11/2018	(Italy) Andrés Britos (Italy) Juan Manuel Restivo	6–4 / 6–4	(Brazil) Francisco Gomes (Brazil) Marcello Jardim	
2/11/2018	(Spain) Javier Ruiz (Spain) Uri Botello	6–3 / 6–1	(Portugal) Francisco Neves (Portugal) Ricardo Martins	

Women's
Date	Winners	Score	Opponent	Ref.
2/11/2018	(Spain) Majo Sánchez (Spain) Mapi Sánchez	Unknown	(Argentina) Delfina Brea (Argentina) Julieta Bidahorria	
2/11/2018	(Spain) Alejandra Salazar (Spain) Marta Marrero	6–2 / 6–3	(Portugal) Ana Catarina Nogueira (Portugal) Filipa Mendonça	
2/11/2018	(Spain) Elisabeth Amatriain (Spain) Patricia Llaguno	6–3 / 6–4	(Portugal) Helena Medeiros (Portugal) Sofia Araújo	
2/11/2018	(Spain) Gemma Triay (Spain) Lucia Sainz	6–2 / 6–2	(France) Laura Clergue (France) Lea Godallier	

=== Semi-Finals ===
Men's
Date	Winners	Score	Opponent	Ref.
3/11/2018	(Spain) Alejandro Galán (Spain) Juan Lebrón	6–2 / 6–4	(Brazil) Lucas Bergamini (Brazil) Lucas Campagnolo	
3/11/2018	(Spain) Javier Ruiz (Spain) Uri Botello	3–6 / 6–3 / 6–0	(Italy) Andrés Britos (Italy) Juan Manuel Restivo	

Women's
Date	Winners	Score	Opponent	Ref.
3/11/2018	(Spain) Majo Sánchez (Spain) Mapi Sánchez	7–6 / 6–2	(Spain) Alejandra Salazar (Spain) Marta Marrero	
3/11/2018	(Spain) Gemma Triay (Spain) Lucia Sainz	7–6 / 6–3	(Spain) Elisabeth Amatriain (Spain) Patricia Llaguno	

=== Finals ===
Men's
Date	Winners	Score	Opponent	Ref.
4/11/2018	(Spain) Alejandro Galán (Spain) Juan Lebrón	W.O.	(Spain) Javier Ruiz (Spain) Uri Botello	

Women's
Date	Winners	Score	Opponent	Ref.
4/11/2018	(Spain) Majo Sánchez (Spain) Mapi Sánchez	6–4 / 7–5	(Spain) Gemma Triay (Spain) Lucia Sainz	
