= 2020 WPT Barcelona Master =

World Padel Tour tournament held in Barcelona, Spain

- Date: 10 – 18 October
- Edition: 13th (Note: The first seven editions were held under the organization of the Padel Pro Tour, with the first eight editions being Open's, while the 1st, 2nd and 12th editions were not held specifically in Barcelona but in the Catalunya region.)
- Category: Master
- Location: Barcelona, Spain
- Venue: Palau Sant Jordi

Champions
- Men's doubles: (Spain) Alejandro Galán (Spain) Juan Lebrón
- Women's doubles: (Spain) Gemma Triay (Spain) Lucía Sainz

Chronology

The 2020 Barcelona Master (officially 2020 World Padel Tour Estrella Damm Barcelona Master Trofeo Adeslas) was the eight tournament of the eight season organized by World Padel Tour, the most prestigious padel circuit at the time.

In the women's category, the number four and number five ranked pairs reached the final. The first finalists were the fourth seeded pair, Gemma Triay and Lucia Sainz, who defeated the world number ones, Alejandra Salazar and Ariana Sánchez, to reach the final. Their opponents would be the number five ranked pair, twins Majo and Mapi Sánchez, who defeated the unexpected semifinalist pair, Aranzazu Osoro and Carolina Navarro (in their first tournament together). In the final, Gemma and Lucia defeated Majo and Mapi without difficulty, winning their second title of the season and their second in the Catalonia region (having already won in 2018). With the victory, Gemma and Lucia also surpassed Ariana and Salazar in the Race Rankings, (Note: the traditional ranking was frozen in the 2020 season) now leading the race to finish the season as the world number 1s.

In the men's category, the first and fourth ranked pairs in the FIP rankings both reached the final for the first time. The first finalists were the world number ones, Alejandro Galán and Juan Lebrón, who avenged their defeat in the previous tournament against the number three ranked pair, Agustín Tapia and Fernando Belasteguín, in the semifinals. Their opponents were the fourth ranked pair, Franco Stupaczuk and Sanyo Gutiérrez, who for the second consecutive tournament defeated the world number two's, Pablo Lima and Paquito Navarro, to reach the final. In the championship match, Galán and Lebrón defeated Sanyo and Stupaczuk in two sets, winning their fifth title of the season and their first in Barcelona.

== Head-to-head record between teams ranked in the top 4 during the season ==
=== Men's ===
Record	Galán–Lebrón	Lima–Paquito	Belasteguín–Tapia	Sanyo–Stupaczuk	Former Pairs	Díaz–Maxi
Galán–Lebrón	—	1–1	2–1	5–0		1–0
Lima–Paquito	1–1	—	0–1	0–2		1–0
Belasteguín–Tapia	1–2	1–0	—	0–3		0–1
Sanyo–Stupaczuk	0–5	2–0	3–0	—		1–0
Former Pairs
Díaz–Maxi	0–1	0–1	1–0	0–1		—

=== Women's ===
Record	Ariana–Salazar	Josemaria–Marrero	Bea–Ortega	Majo–Mapi	Former Pairs	Gemma–Lucia	Delfina–Nogueira
Ariana–Salazar	—	1–1	1–1	2–0		2–2	1–0
Josemaria–Marrero	1–1	—	1–0	2–2		2–2	—
Bea–Ortega	1–1	0–1	—	2–1		0–2	1–0
Majo–Mapi	0–2	2–2	1–2	—		1–1	1–0
Former Pairs
Gemma–Lucia	2–2	2–2	2–0	1–1		—	1–0
Delfina–Nogueira	0–1	—	0–1	0–1		0–1	—

== Draws ==
=== Men's Bracket ===
Round of 32
1	(Spain) Galán / (Spain) Lebrón	7	7
(Argentina) L. Capra / (Argentina) R. Moyano	5	5
(Spain) R. Méndez / (Argentina) S. Nerone	4	6	4
Q	(Brazil) F. Gomes / (Argentina) Godo Díaz	6	3	6
(Argentina) F. Quiles / (Spain) S. Oria	4	6	6
(Argentina) D. Perino / (Spain) J. Gutiérrez	6	3	7
(Spain) M. Piñeiro / (Spain) N. Gadea	1	7	2
8	(Argentina) A. Silingo / (Spain) M. Díaz	6	6	6
7	(Argentina) Di Nenno / (Argentina) Maxi	7	4	3
(Argentina) A. Allemandi / (Spain) Momo	6	6	6
Q	(Spain) J. Barahona / (Spain) J. Moya	4	4
(Spain) Coki / (Spain) J. Rico	6	6
Q	(Spain) R. Rivera / (Spain) T. Bueno	6	3
LL	(Spain) A. Sans / (Spain) I. Zaratiegui	7	6
(Argentina) C. Gutiérrez / (Argentina) M. Grabiel	3	0
3	(Argentina) Belasteguín / (Argentina) Tapia	6	6
4	(Argentina) Sanyo / (Argentina) Stupaczuk	6	2	0
(Spain) C. Fuster / (Spain) G. Rubio	4	6	6
(Spain) J.M. Díaz / (Brazil) L. Campagnolo	6	6
(Spain) J.G. Diestro / (Spain) V. Ruiz	2	3
(Spain) A. Ruiz / (Spain) P. Lijó	7	7
(Argentina) A. Gutiérrez / (Argentina) J.C. Belluati	5	6
(Spain) A. Blanco / (Spain) J. Martinez	3	1
5	(Argentina) F. Chingotto / (Argentina) J. Tello	6	6
6	(Spain) J. Ruiz / (Spain) U. Botello	4	4
(Spain) F. Gil Morales / (Spain) S. Alba	6	6
(Spain) E. Moreno / (Spain) J. Rico	2	6	6
(Spain) Coello / (Spain) I. Ramírez	6	4	7
(Spain) J. Garrido / (Spain) J. Mieres	2	6	4
(Spain) Á. Cepero / (Spain) P. Fernández	6	4	6
Q	(Spain) J. Morillas / (Spain) M. Del Castillo	6	3	3
2	(Brazil) P. Lima / (Spain) Paquito	3	6	6

Round of 16
1	(Spain) Galán / (Spain) Lebrón	6	6
(Brazil) F. Gomes / (Argentina) Godo Díaz	3	2
(Argentina) D. Perino / (Spain) J. Gutiérrez	6	0	1
8	(Argentina) A. Silingo / (Spain) M. Díaz	2	6	6
(Argentina) A. Allemandi / (Spain) Momo	6	6
(Spain) Coki / (Spain) J. Rico	3	3
(Spain) A. Sans / (Spain) I. Zaratiegui	6	0
3	(Argentina) Belasteguín / (Argentina) Tapia	7	6
4	(Argentina) Sanyo / (Argentina) Stupaczuk	6	6
(Spain) J.M. Díaz / (Brazil) L. Campagnolo	3	2
(Spain) A. Ruiz / (Spain) P. Lijó	4	3
5	(Argentina) F. Chingotto / (Argentina) J. Tello	6	6
(Spain) F. Gil Morales / (Spain) S. Alba	3	6	7
(Spain) Coello / (Spain) I. Ramírez	6	1	5
(Spain) Á. Cepero / (Spain) P. Fernández	1	0
2	(Brazil) P. Lima / (Spain) Paquito	6	6

Quarter-Final
1	(Spain) Galán / (Spain) Lebrón	5	7	6
8	(Argentina) A. Silingo / (Spain) M. Díaz	7	6	1
(Argentina) A. Allemandi / (Spain) Momo	2	4
3	(Argentina) Belasteguín / (Argentina) Tapia	6	6
4	(Argentina) Sanyo / (Argentina) Stupaczuk	3	6	7
5	(Argentina) F. Chingotto / (Argentina) J. Tello	6	2	6
(Spain) F. Gil Morales / (Spain) S. Alba	2	4
2	(Brazil) P. Lima / (Spain) Paquito	6	6

Semi-Finals
1	(Spain) Galán / (Spain) Lebrón	7	7
3	(Argentina) Belasteguín / (Argentina) Tapia	6	6
4	(Argentina) Sanyo / (Argentina) Stupaczuk	2	7	6
2	(Brazil) P. Lima / (Spain) Paquito	6	6	2

Finals
1	(Spain) Galán / (Spain) Lebrón	6	6
4	(Argentina) Sanyo / (Argentina) Stupaczuk	4	1

=== Women's Bracket ===
Round of 32
1	(Spain) Ariana / (Spain) Salazar	6	6
(France) L. Clergue / (France) L. Godallier	3	0
Q	(Argentina) C. Jensen / (Spain) M. Gómez	5	6
(Spain) B. Las Heras / (Spain) C. Mesa	7	7
(Spain) M. Villalba / (Spain) V. Virseda	6	6
Q	(Italy) C. Casali / (Italy) C. Orsi	3	3
(Spain) A. Cantin / (Spain) N. Rodríguez	4	7	4
7	(Portugal) A.C. Nogueira / (Argentina) D. Brea	6	5	6
6	(Spain) E. Amatriain / (Spain) P. Llaguno	6	6
(Spain) B. Caldera / (Spain) C. Goenaga	4	4
Q	(Spain) A. Soriano / (Spain) P. Martínez	2	4
(France) A. Collombon / (Spain) N. Traviesa	6	6
(Spain) L. Alonso / (Brazil) R. Piltcher	6	6
(Spain) J. Bautista / (Spain) M. Lobo	4	4
(Spain) E. Carnicero / (Spain) T. Navarro	0	4
4	(Spain) Gemma / (Spain) L. Sainz	6	6
3	(Spain) Bea González / (Spain) M. Ortega	6	6
(Argentina) C. Tenorio / (Argentina) J. Bidahorria	0	1
(Spain) A. Blanco / (Spain) A. Cañellas	2	3
(Argentina) C. Paz / (Spain) I. Dominguez	6	6
(Spain) S. Hernández / (Spain) T. Icardo	6	6
(Spain) A. Tapia / (Spain) J. Castelló	3	4
(Spain) L. Rufo / (Spain) M. Talavan	5	4
8	(Argentina) A. Osoro / (Spain) C. Navarro	7	6
5	(Spain) Majo / (Spain) Mapi	6	6
(Spain) M. Gabarrus / (Spain) N. Rovira	3	4
(Portugal) S. Araújo / (Argentina) V. Riera	6	3	2
(Spain) M. Merino / (Spain) S. Ruiz	3	6	6
(Spain) A. Galán / (Spain) V. Iglesias	4	6	6
(Spain) A.F. de Ossó / (Spain) L. Martínez	6	1	4
(Spain) A. Martinez / (Argentina) N. Brito	2	0
(Spain) M. Marrero / (Spain) P. Josemaría	6	6

Round of 16
1	(Spain) Ariana / (Spain) Salazar	6	6
(Spain) B. Las Heras / (Spain) C. Mesa	3	1
(Spain) M. Villalba / (Spain) V. Virseda	6	6
7	(Portugal) A.C. Nogueira / (Argentina) D. Brea	2	2
6	(Spain) E. Amatriain / (Spain) P. Llaguno	7	7
(France) A. Collombon / (Spain) N. Traviesa	6	5
(Spain) L. Alonso / (Brazil) R. Piltcher	1	0
4	(Spain) Gemma / (Spain) L. Sainz	6	6
3	(Spain) Bea González / (Spain) M. Ortega	6	6
(Argentina) C. Paz / (Spain) I. Dominguez	1	2
(Spain) S. Hernández / (Spain) T. Icardo	4	2
8	(Argentina) A. Osoro / (Spain) C. Navarro	6	6
5	(Spain) Majo / (Spain) Mapi	6	6
(Spain) M. Merino / (Spain) S. Ruiz	2	2
(Spain) A. Galán / (Spain) V. Iglesias	1	4
2	(Spain) M. Marrero / (Spain) P. Josemaría	6	6

Quarter-Final
1	(Spain) Ariana / (Spain) Salazar	6	6
(Spain) M. Villalba / (Spain) V. Virseda	2	1
6	(Spain) E. Amatriain / (Spain) P. Llaguno	3	3
4	(Spain) Gemma / (Spain) L. Sainz	6	6
3	(Spain) Bea González / (Spain) M. Ortega	6	4
8	(Argentina) A. Osoro / (Spain) C. Navarro	7	6
5	(Spain) Majo / (Spain) Mapi	6	6
2	(Spain) M. Marrero / (Spain) P. Josemaría	2	4

Semi-Finals
1	(Spain) Ariana / (Spain) Salazar	1	7	1
4	(Spain) Gemma / (Spain) L. Sainz	6	6	6
8	(Argentina) A. Osoro / (Spain) C. Navarro	3	3
5	(Spain) Majo / (Spain) Mapi	6	6

Finals
4	(Spain) Gemma / (Spain) L. Sainz	6	6
5	(Spain) Majo / (Spain) Mapi	2	3

== Results ==
=== Round of 32 ===
Men's
Date	Winners	Score	Opponent	Ref.
14/10/2020	(Spain) Alejandro Galán (Spain) Juan Lebrón	7–5 / 7–5	(Argentina) Luciano Capra (Argentina) Ramiro Moyano	
14/10/2020	(Brazil) Francisco Gomes (Argentina) Godo Díaz	6–4 / 3–6 / 6–4	(Spain) Rafael Méndez (Argentina) Sebastián Nerone	
14/10/2020	(Argentina) Denis Perino (Spain) Jorge Ruiz Gutiérrez	6–4 / 3–6 / 7–6	(Argentina) Federico Quiles (Spain) Salvador Oria	
14/10/2020	(Argentina) Agustin Gómez Silingo (Spain) Matías Díaz	6–1 / 6–7 / 6–2	(Spain) Martin Sánchez Piñeiro (Spain) Nacho Gadea	
14/10/2020	(Argentina) Adrián Allemandi (Spain) Momo González	6–7 / 6–4 / 6–3	(Argentina) Martín Di Nenno (Argentina) Maxi Sánchez	
14/10/2020	(Spain) Coki Nieto (Spain) Javi Rico	6–4 / 6–4	(Spain) Javier Barahona (Spain) Jesus Moya	
14/10/2020	(Spain) Anton Sans (Spain) Iñigo Zaratiegui	7–6 / 6–3	(Spain) Rubén Rivera (Spain) Toni Bueno	
14/10/2020	(Argentina) Agustín Tapia (Argentina) Fernando Belasteguín	6–3 / 6–0	(Argentina) Cristian Gutiérrez (Argentina) Maxi Grabiel	
14/10/2020	(Argentina) Franco Stupaczuk (Argentina) Sanyo Gutiérrez	4–6 / 6–2 / 6–0	(Spain) Christian Fuster (Spain) Gonzalo Rubio	
14/10/2020	(Spain) Juan Martín Díaz (Brazil) Lucas Campagnolo	6–2 / 6–3	(Spain) José García Diestro (Spain) Victor Ruiz	
14/10/2020	(Spain) Alejandro Ruiz (Spain) Pablo Lijó	7–5 / 7–6	(Argentina) Agustin Gutiérrez (Argentina) Juan Cruz Belluati	
14/10/2020	(Argentina) Federico Chingotto (Argentina) Juan Tello	6–3 / 6–1	(Spain) Adrián Blanco (Spain) Javier Martinez Vazquez	
14/10/2020	(Spain) Francisco Gil Morales (Spain) Sergio Alba	6–4 / 6–4	(Spain) Javi Ruiz (Spain) Uri Botello	
14/10/2020	(Spain) Arturo Coello (Spain) Iván Ramírez	6–2 / 4–6 / 7–6	(Spain) Ernesto Moreno (Spain) José Rico	
14/10/2020	(Spain) Álvaro Cepero (Spain) Pincho Fernández	6–2 / 4–6 / 6–4	(Spain) Javier Garrido (Spain) Juani Mieres	
14/10/2020	(Brazil) Pablo Lima (Spain) Paquito Navarro	3–6 / 6–3 / 6–3	(Spain) Javier Morillas (Spain) Mario Del Castillo	

Women's
Date	Winners	Score	Opponent	Ref.
14/10/2020	(Spain) Alejandra Salazar (Spain) Ariana Sánchez	6–3 / 6–0	(France) Laura Clergue (France) Léa Godallier	
14/10/2020	(Spain) Barbara Las Heras (Spain) Carla Mesa	7–5 / 7–6	(Argentina) Claudia Jensen (Spain) Mónica Gómez Rivas	
14/10/2020	(Spain) Maria Villalba (Spain) Verónica Virseda	6–3 / 6–3	(Italy) Carlotta Casali (Italy) Carolina Orsi	
14/10/2020	(Portugal) Ana Catarina Nogueira (Argentina) Delfina Brea	6–4 / 5–7 / 6–4	(Spain) Angela Caro Cantin (Spain) Nuria Rodríguez	
14/10/2020	(Spain) Elisabeth Amatriain (Spain) Patricia Llaguno	6–4 / 6–4	(Spain) Beatriz Caldera (Spain) Carmen Goenaga	
14/10/2020	(France) Alix Collombon (Spain) Nicole Traviesa Mola	6–2 / 6–4	(Spain) Arantxa Soriano (Spain) Patricia Martínez	
14/10/2020	(Spain) Lorena Alonso (Brazil) Raquel Piltcher	6–4 / 6–4	(Spain) Julia Polo Bautista (Spain) Marina Martinez Lobo	
14/10/2020	(Spain) Gemma Triay (Spain) Lucia Sainz	6–0 / 6–1	(Spain) Esther Carnicero (Spain) Teresa Navarro	
14/10/2020	(Spain) Bea González (Spain) Marta Ortega	6–0 / 6–1	(Argentina) Catalina Tenorio (Argentina) Julieta Bidahorria	
14/10/2020	(Argentina) Celeste Paz (Spain) Isabel Dominguez	6–2 / 6–3	(Spain) Alicia Blanco Rojo (Spain) Ariadna Cañellas	
14/10/2020	(Spain) Sandra Hernández (Spain) Tamara Icardo	6–3 / 6–4	(Spain) Anna Cortiles Tapia (Spain) Jessica Castelló	
14/10/2020	(Argentina) Aranzazu Osoro (Spain) Carolina Navarro	7–5 / 6–4	(Spain) Lorena Rufo (Spain) Marta Talavan	
14/10/2020	(Spain) Majo Sánchez (Spain) Mapi Sánchez	6–3 / 6–4	(Spain) Maite Gabarrús (Spain) Nuria Rovira	
14/10/2020	(Spain) Melania Merino (Spain) Sara Ruiz	3–6 / 6–3 / 6–2	(Portugal) Sofia Araújo (Argentina) Virginia Riera	
14/10/2020	(Spain) Alba Galán (Spain) Victoria Iglesias	4–6 / 6–1 / 6–4	(Spain) Ana Fernández de Ossó (Spain) Lucía Martínez	
14/10/2020	(Spain) Marta Marrero (Spain) Paula Josemaría	6–2 / 6–0	(Spain) Araceli Martinez (Argentina) Nela Brito	

=== Round of 16 ===
Men's
Date	Winners	Score	Opponent	Ref.
15/10/2020	(Spain) Alejandro Galán (Spain) Juan Lebrón	6–3 / 6–2	(Brazil) Francisco Gomes (Argentina) Godo Díaz	
15/10/2020	(Argentina) Agustin Gómez Silingo (Spain) Matías Díaz	2–6 / 6–0 / 6–1	(Argentina) Denis Perino (Spain) Jorge Ruiz Gutiérrez	
15/10/2020	(Argentina) Adrián Allemandi (Spain) Momo González	6–3 / 6–3	(Spain) Coki Nieto (Spain) Javi Rico	
15/10/2020	(Argentina) Agustín Tapia (Argentina) Fernando Belasteguín	7–6 / 6–0	(Spain) Anton Sans (Spain) Iñigo Zaratiegui	
15/10/2020	(Argentina) Franco Stupaczuk (Argentina) Sanyo Gutiérrez	6–3 / 6–2	(Spain) Juan Martín Díaz (Brazil) Lucas Campagnolo	
15/10/2020	(Argentina) Federico Chingotto (Argentina) Juan Tello	6–4 / 6–3	(Spain) Alejandro Ruiz (Spain) Pablo Lijó	
15/10/2020	(Spain) Francisco Gil Morales (Spain) Sergio Alba	3–6 / 6–1 / 7–5	(Spain) Arturo Coello (Spain) Iván Ramírez	
15/10/2020	(Brazil) Pablo Lima (Spain) Paquito Navarro	6–1 / 6–0	(Spain) Álvaro Cepero (Spain) Pincho Fernández	

Women's
Date	Winners	Score	Opponent	Ref.
15/10/2020	(Spain) Alejandra Salazar (Spain) Ariana Sánchez	6–3 / 6–1	(Spain) Barbara Las Heras (Spain) Carla Mesa	
15/10/2020	(Spain) Maria Villalba (Spain) Verónica Virseda	6–2 / 6–2	(Portugal) Ana Catarina Nogueira (Argentina) Delfina Brea	
15/10/2020	(Spain) Elisabeth Amatriain (Spain) Patricia Llaguno	7–6 / 7–5	(France) Alix Collombon (Spain) Nicole Traviesa Mola	
15/10/2020	(Spain) Gemma Triay (Spain) Lucia Sainz	6–1 / 6–0	(Spain) Lorena Alonso (Brazil) Raquel Piltcher	
15/10/2020	(Spain) Bea González (Spain) Marta Ortega	6–1 / 6–2	(Argentina) Celeste Paz (Spain) Isabel Dominguez	
15/10/2020	(Argentina) Aranzazu Osoro (Spain) Carolina Navarro	6–4 / 6–2	(Spain) Sandra Hernández (Spain) Tamara Icardo	
15/10/2020	(Spain) Majo Sánchez (Spain) Mapi Sánchez	6–2 / 6–2	(Spain) Melania Merino (Spain) Sara Ruiz	
15/10/2020	(Spain) Marta Marrero (Spain) Paula Josemaría	6–1 / 6–4	(Spain) Alba Galán (Spain) Victoria Iglesias	

=== Quarter-Finals ===
Men's
Date	Winners	Score	Opponent	Ref.
16/10/2020	(Spain) Alejandro Galán (Spain) Juan Lebrón	5–7 / 7–6 / 6–1	(Argentina) Agustin Gómez Silingo (Spain) Matías Díaz	
16/10/2020	(Argentina) Agustín Tapia (Argentina) Fernando Belasteguín	6–2 / 6–4	(Argentina) Adrián Allemandi (Spain) Momo González	
16/10/2020	(Argentina) Franco Stupaczuk (Argentina) Sanyo Gutiérrez	3–6 / 6–2 / 7–6	(Argentina) Federico Chingotto (Argentina) Juan Tello	
16/10/2020	(Brazil) Pablo Lima (Spain) Paquito Navarro	6–2 / 6–4	(Spain) Francisco Gil Morales (Spain) Sergio Alba	

Women's
Date	Winners	Score	Opponent	Ref.
16/10/2020	(Spain) Alejandra Salazar (Spain) Ariana Sánchez	6–2 / 6–1	(Spain) Maria Villalba (Spain) Verónica Virseda	
16/10/2020	(Spain) Gemma Triay (Spain) Lucia Sainz	6–3 / 6–3	(Spain) Elisabeth Amatriain (Spain) Patricia Llaguno	
16/10/2020	(Argentina) Aranzazu Osoro (Spain) Carolina Navarro	7–6 / 6–4	(Spain) Bea González (Spain) Marta Ortega	
16/10/2020	(Spain) Majo Sánchez (Spain) Mapi Sánchez	6–2 / 6–4	(Spain) Marta Marrero (Spain) Paula Josemaría	

=== Semi-Finals ===
Men's
Date	Winners	Score	Opponent	Ref.
17/10/2020	(Spain) Alejandro Galán (Spain) Juan Lebrón	7–6 / 7–6	(Argentina) Agustín Tapia (Argentina) Fernando Belasteguín	
17/10/2020	(Argentina) Franco Stupaczuk (Argentina) Sanyo Gutiérrez	2–6 / 7–6 / 6–2	(Brazil) Pablo Lima (Spain) Paquito Navarro	

Women's
Date	Winners	Score	Opponent	Ref.
17/10/2020	(Spain) Gemma Triay (Spain) Lucia Sainz	6–1 / 6–7 / 6–1	(Spain) Alejandra Salazar (Spain) Ariana Sánchez	
17/10/2020	(Spain) Majo Sánchez (Spain) Mapi Sánchez	6–3 / 6–3	(Argentina) Aranzazu Osoro (Spain) Carolina Navarro	

=== Finals ===
Men's
Date	Winners	Score	Opponent	Ref.
18/10/2020	(Spain) Alejandro Galán (Spain) Juan Lebrón	6–4 / 6–1	(Argentina) Franco Stupaczuk (Argentina) Sanyo Gutiérrez	

Women's
Date	Winners	Score	Opponent	Ref.
18/10/2020	(Spain) Gemma Triay (Spain) Lucia Sainz	6–2 / 6–3	(Spain) Majo Sánchez (Spain) Mapi Sánchez	
