= 2018 WPT Catalunya Master =

World Padel Tour tournament held in Catalunya, Spain

- Date: 17 – 25 March
- Edition: 12th (Note: The first seven editions were held under the organization of the Padel Pro Tour, with the first eight editions being Open's, while from the third to the 11th edition, the events were held specifically in Barcelona.)
- Category: Master
- Location: Badalona, Spain
- Venue: Palau Municipal d'Esports de Badalona

Champions
- Men's doubles: (Argentina) Maxi Sánchez (Argentina) Sanyo Gutiérrez
- Women's doubles: (Spain) Gemma Triay (Spain) Lucía Sainz

Chronology
Previous
Master Final
(2017)
Next
Alicante Open

The 2018 Catalunya Master (officially 2018 World Padel Tour Catalunya Master) was the first tournament of the sixth season organized by World Padel Tour, the most prestigious padel circuit at the time.

In the women's category, the third-ranked pair, Gemma Triay and Lucia Sainz, reached the final after defeating the top-ranked pairs on the FIP rankings, Majo and Mapi Sánchez in the semifinals. In the title match, Gemma and Lucia defeated world number twos Alejandra Salazar and Marta Marrero, securing their first title of the season, their first in Catalunya, and their third overall since teaming up.

In the men's category, much like in the women's, Juan Cruz Belluati and Juan Lebrón reached the final after a surprise victory over the world number ones, Fernando Belasteguín and Pablo Lima, in the semifinals. In the deciding match, the circuit's number two pair, Maxi Sánchez and Sanyo Gutiérrez, defeated Belluati and Lebrón, becoming the season's inaugural champions and winning their first title in Catalunya.

The tournament's standout performer was 18-year-old Agustín Tapia. He eliminated Lucho Capra and Ramiro Moyano, who had surprisingly knocked out the world number four pair, Cristian Gutiérrez and Franco Stupaczuk, thereby reaching the quarterfinals.

== Head-to-head record between teams ranked in the top 4 during the season ==
=== Men's ===
Record	Belasteguín–Lima	Maxi–Sanyo	J.M. Díaz–Paquito	Gutiérrez–Stupaczuk
Belasteguín–Lima	—	—	—	—
Maxi–Sanyo	—	—	—	—
J.M. Díaz–Paquito	—	—	—	—
Gutiérrez–Stupaczuk	—	—	—	—

=== Women's ===
Record	Majo–Mapi	Marrero–Salazar	Triay–Sainz	Ariana–Ortega
Majo–Mapi	—	—	0–1	—
Marrero–Salazar	—	—	0–1	1–0
Triay–Sainz	1–0	1–0	—	—
Ariana–Ortega	—	0–1	—	—

== Draws ==
=== Men's Bracket ===
Round of 32
1	(Argentina) Belasteguín / (Brazil) Lima	6	6
(Argentina) J. Escalante / (Spain) J. Muñoz	1	1
(Argentina) A. Patiniotis / (Spain) P.A. Martinez	6	6
Q	(Uruguay) D. Ramos / (Spain) R. Méndez	3	4
(Spain) Aday Santana / (Spain) N. Gadea	3	6	2
(Brazil) L. Bergamini / (Brazil) L. Campagnolo	6	2	6
(Argentina) G. Tamame / (Argentina) M. Marina	2	6	4
6	(Spain) J. Mieres / (Argentina) M. Lamperti	6	4	6
(Argentina) J.C. Belluati / (Spain) Lebrón	6	3	6
(Argentina) J. Restivo / (Argentina) Di Nenno	3	6	2
(Spain) A. Blanco / (Spain) B. Yribarren	4	3
(Argentina) Chingotto / (Argentina) J. Tello	6	6
(Argentina) M. Grabiel / (Spain) P. Lijó	6	2	4
(Brazil) M. Jardim / (Argentina) Tapia	3	6	6
(Argentina) L. Capra / (Argentina) R. Moyano	6	6
4	(Argentina) C. Gutiérrez / (Argentina) Stupaczuk	3	4
3	(Spain) J.M. Díaz / (Spain) Paquito	6	6
(Brazil) C. Gomes / (Spain) E. Moreno	3	0
(Spain) G. Company / (Spain) R. Rivera	6	6
Q	(Spain) R. García / (Spain) R. Marcos	2	2
Q	(Spain) G. Rubio / (Spain) J. Garrido	2	6
(Argentina) F. Poggi / (Argentina) G. Reca	6	7
(Argentina) M. Nicoletti / (Spain) T. Bueno	1	1
5	(Spain) Galán / (Spain) M. Díaz	6	6
(Spain) J. Ruiz / (Spain) U. Botello	7	6
(Spain) J.G. Diestro / (Argentina) S. Nerone	6	3
(Spain) J. Rico / (Spain) V. Ruiz	6	7	2
(Spain) A. Cepero / (Argentina) Godo Díaz	7	5	6
(Argentina) C.G. Gutiérrez / (Argentina) J. Vázquez	2	6	4
(Argentina) A. Allemandi / (Argentina) F. Quiles	6	4	6
(Spain) M. Piñeiro / (Spain) W. Lahoz	0	6	2
2	(Argentina) Maxi / (Argentina) Sanyo	6	4	6

Round of 16
1	(Argentina) Belasteguín / (Brazil) Lima	6	6
(Argentina) A. Patiniotis / (Spain) P.A. Martinez	3	3
(Brazil) L. Bergamini / (Brazil) L. Campagnolo	7	6
6	(Spain) J. Mieres / (Argentina) M. Lamperti	6	4
(Argentina) J.C. Belluati / (Spain) Lebrón	6	6
(Argentina) Chingotto / (Argentina) J. Tello	2	3
(Brazil) M. Jardim / (Argentina) Tapia	4	6	6
(Argentina) L. Capra / (Argentina) R. Moyano	6	0	1
3	(Spain) J.M. Díaz / (Spain) Paquito	6	6
(Spain) G. Company / (Spain) R. Rivera	1	2
(Argentina) F. Poggi / (Argentina) G. Reca	2	1
5	(Spain) Galán / (Spain) M. Díaz	6	6
(Spain) J. Ruiz / (Spain) U. Botello	7	6
(Spain) A. Cepero / (Argentina) Godo Díaz	5	1
(Argentina) A. Allemandi / (Argentina) F. Quiles	6	0
2	(Argentina) Maxi / (Argentina) Sanyo	7	6

Quarter-Final
1	(Argentina) Belasteguín / (Brazil) Lima	6	6
(Brazil) L. Bergamini / (Brazil) L. Campagnolo	1	2
(Argentina) J.C. Belluati / (Spain) Lebrón	7	5	6
(Brazil) M. Jardim / (Argentina) Tapia	6	7	4
3	(Spain) J.M. Díaz / (Spain) Paquito	3	0
5	(Spain) Galán / (Spain) M. Díaz	6	6
(Spain) J. Ruiz / (Spain) U. Botello	0	5
2	(Argentina) Maxi / (Argentina) Sanyo	6	7

Semi-Finals
1	(Argentina) Belasteguín / (Brazil) Lima	4	6	3
(Argentina) J.C. Belluati / (Spain) Lebrón	6	1	6
5	(Spain) Galán / (Spain) M. Díaz	3	4
2	(Argentina) Maxi / (Argentina) Sanyo	6	6

Finals
(Argentina) J.C. Belluati / (Spain) Lebrón	4	2
2	(Argentina) Maxi / (Argentina) Sanyo	6	6

=== Women's Bracket ===
Round of 32
1	(Spain) Majo / (Spain) Mapi
Bye
(Spain) A. Blanco / (Spain) B. Caldera	6	2
Q	(Spain) C. Argemi / (Spain) N. Rovira	7	6
(Portugal) A.C. Nogueira / Delfina	7	6
(Argentina) A. Osoro / (Argentina) N. Brito	5	4
(Spain) Meli G. Truchado / (Spain) L. Clergue	3	1
(Spain) C. Navarro / (Argentina) C. Reiter	6	6
(Spain) B. González / (Argentina) C. Tenorio	6	7
(Spain) C. Mesa / (Spain) M. Talavan	0	5
(France) Collombon / (Spain) S. Pujals	6	3	*
(Spain) A. Medina / (Spain) E. Ramirez	2	1
(Spain) I. Domínguez / (Spain) V. Alonso	6	6
Q	(Spain) E. Lasheras / (Spain) S. Lopez	2	2
Bye
3	(Spain) Gemma / (Spain) L. Sainz
4	(Spain) A. Sánchez / (Spain) M. Ortega
Bye
(Spain) A. Galán / (Spain) M. Villalba	6	6
(Spain) L. Alonso / (Argentina) V. Riera	4	1
(Argentina) G. Bartomioli / (Spain) S. Ruiz	4	1
(Spain) C. Pérez / (Spain) N. Marquez	6	6
(Spain) L. Martínez / (Spain) T. Icardo	2	5
(Spain) T. Navarro / (Spain) V. Iglesias	6	7
(Spain) A.F. de Ossó / (Spain) M. Gabarrus	6	6
(Spain) A. Cantin / (Spain) N. Rodriguez	4	3
(Spain) P. Josemaria / (Argentina) V. Pavon	3	6
(Spain) E. Amatriain / (Spain) P. Llaguno	6	7
(Spain) S. Hernández / (Spain) V. Virseda	6	6
(Argentina) A. Berl / (Spain) I. Egaña	3	0
Bye
2	(Spain) A. Salazar / (Spain) M. Marrero

Round of 16
1	(Spain) Majo / (Spain) Mapi	6	6
Q	(Spain) C. Argemi / (Spain) N. Rovira	2	1
(Portugal) A.C. Nogueira / Delfina	1	4
(Spain) C. Navarro / (Argentina) C. Reiter	6	6
(Spain) B. González / (Argentina) C. Tenorio	6	6
(France) Collombon / (Spain) S. Pujals	1	1
(Spain) I. Domínguez / (Spain) V. Alonso	3	3
3	(Spain) Gemma / (Spain) L. Sainz	6	6
4	(Spain) A. Sánchez / (Spain) M. Ortega	6	6
(Spain) A. Galán / (Spain) M. Villalba	4	2
(Spain) C. Pérez / (Spain) N. Marquez	2	0
(Spain) T. Navarro / (Spain) V. Iglesias	6	6
(Spain) A.F. de Ossó / (Spain) M. Gabarrus	1	4
(Spain) E. Amatriain / (Spain) P. Llaguno	6	6
(Spain) S. Hernández / (Spain) V. Virseda	3	3
2	(Spain) A. Salazar / (Spain) M. Marrero	6	6

Quarter-Final
1	(Spain) Majo / (Spain) Mapi	6	6
(Spain) C. Navarro / (Argentina) C. Reiter	1	4
(Spain) B. González / (Argentina) C. Tenorio	2	1
3	(Spain) Gemma / (Spain) L. Sainz	6	6
4	(Spain) A. Sánchez / (Spain) M. Ortega	3	6	7
(Spain) T. Navarro / (Spain) V. Iglesias	6	2	5
(Spain) E. Amatriain / (Spain) P. Llaguno	6	6	1
2	(Spain) A. Salazar / (Spain) M. Marrero	4	7	6

Semi-Finals
1	(Spain) Majo / (Spain) Mapi	4	7	2
3	(Spain) Gemma / (Spain) L. Sainz	6	6	6
4	(Spain) A. Sánchez / (Spain) M. Ortega	6	6	2
2	(Spain) A. Salazar / (Spain) M. Marrero	7	4	6

Finals
3	(Spain) Gemma / (Spain) L. Sainz	6	5	6
2	(Spain) A. Salazar / (Spain) M. Marrero	2	7	4

== Results ==
=== Round of 32 ===
Men's

Date	Winners	Score	Opponent	Refs.
21/3/2018	(Argentina) Fernando Belasteguín (Brazil) Pablo Lima	6–1 / 6–1	(Argentina) Javier Escalante (Spain) Jordi Muñoz	
21/3/2018	(Argentina) Aris Patiniotis (Spain) Pedro Alonso Martinez	6–3 / 6–4	(Uruguay) Diego Ramos (Spain) Rafael Méndez	
21/3/2018	(Brazil) Lucas Bergamini (Brazil) Lucas Campagnolo	6–3 / 2–6 / 6–2	(Spain) Aday Santana (Spain) Nacho Gadea	
21/3/2018	(Spain) Juani Mieres (Argentina) Miguel Lamperti	6–2 / 4–6 / 6–4	(Argentina) German Tamame (Argentina) Matías Marina	
21/3/2018	(Argentina) Juan Cruz Belluati (Spain) Juan Lebrón	6–3 / 3–6 / 6–2	(Argentina) Juan Restivo (Argentina) Martín Di Nenno	
21/3/2018	(Argentina) Federico Chingotto (Argentina) Juan Tello	6–4 / 6–3	(Spain) Adrián Blanco (Spain) Borja Yribarren	
21/3/2018	(Argentina) Agustín Tapia (Brazil) Marcello Jardim	3–6 / 6–2 / 6–4	(Argentina) Maxi Grabiel (Spain) Pablo Lijó	
21/3/2018	(Argentina) Lucho Capra (Argentina) Ramiro Moyano	6–3 / 6–4	(Argentina) Cristian Gutiérrez (Argentina) Franco Stupaczuk	
21/3/2018	(Spain) Juan Martin Díaz (Spain) Paquito Navarro	6–3 / 6–0	(Brazil) Chico Gomes (Spain) Ernesto Moreno	
21/3/2018	(Spain) Gerard Company (Spain) Rubén Rivera	6–2 / 6–2	(Spain) Raúl Díaz García (Spain) Raúl Marcos	
21/3/2018	(Argentina) Fernando Poggi (Argentina) Gaby Reca	6–2 / 7–6	(Spain) Gonzalo Rubio (Spain) Javi Garrido	
21/3/2018	(Spain) Alejandro Galán (Spain) Matías Díaz	6–1 / 6–1	(Argentina) Matías Nicoletti (Spain) Toni Bueno	
21/3/2018	(Spain) Javi Ruiz (Spain) Uri Botello	7–6 / 6–3	(Spain) José García Diestro (Argentina) Sebastián Nerone	
21/3/2018	(Spain) Álvaro Cepero (Argentina) Godo Díaz	7–6 / 5–7 / 6–2	(Spain) José Rico (Spain) Víctor Ruiz	
21/3/2018	(Argentina) Adrian Allemandi (Argentina) Federico Quiles	6–2 / 4–6 / 6–4	(Argentina) Cristian German Gutiérrez (Argentina) Juan Manuel Vázquez	
21/3/2018	(Argentina) Maxi Sánchez (Argentina) Sanyo Gutiérrez	6–0 / 4–6 / 6–2	(Spain) Martin Sanchez Piñeiro (Spain) Willy Lahoz	

Women's

Date	Winners	Score	Opponent	Refs.
21/3/2018	(Spain) Cristina Argemi (Spain) Nuria Rovira	7–6 / 6–2	(Spain) Alicia Blanco Rojo (Spain) Beatriz Caldera	
21/3/2018	(Portugal) Ana Catarina Nogueira (Argentina) Delfina Brea	7–5 / 6–4	(Argentina) Aranzazu Osoro (Argentina) Nela Brito	
21/3/2018	(Spain) Carolina Navarro (Argentina) Cecilia Reiter	6–3 / 6–1	(Spain) Laura Clergue (Spain) Meli García	
21/3/2018	(Spain) Beatriz González (Argentina) Catalina Tenorio	6–0 / 7–5	(Spain) Carla Mesa (Spain) Marta Talavan	
21/3/2018	(France) Alix Collombon (Spain) Sara Pujals	6–2 / 3–1 / W.O.	(Spain) Andrea Medina Tomás (Spain) Elena Ramirez	
21/3/2018	(Spain) Isabel Domínguez (Spain) Vanesa Alonso	6–2 / 6–2	(Spain) Esther Lasheras (Spain) Silvia Lopez Vidal	
21/3/2018	(Spain) Alba Galán (Spain) Maria Villalba	6–4 / 6–1	(Spain) Lorena Alonso (Argentina) Virginia Riera	
21/3/2018	(Spain) Cynthia Pérez Domenech (Spain) Noelia Marquez	6–4 / 6–1	(Argentina) Gabriela Bartomioli (Spain) Sara Ruiz	
21/3/2018	(Spain) Teresa Navarro (Spain) Victoria Iglesias	6–2 / 7–5	(Spain) Lucía Martínez (Spain) Tamara Icardo	
21/3/2018	(Spain) Ana Fernandez de Ossó (Spain) Maite Gabarrus Alonso	6–4 / 6–3	(Spain) Angela Caro Cantin (Spain) Nuria Rodriguez	
21/3/2018	(Spain) Elisabeth Amatriain (Spain) Patricia Llaguno	6–3 / 7–6	(Spain) Paula Josemaria (Argentina) Valeria Pavon	
21/3/2018	(Spain) Sandra Hernández (Spain) Verónica Virseda	6–3 / 6–0	(Argentina) Alicia Lilian Berl (Spain) Idoia Martin Egaña	

=== Round of 16 ===
Men's

Date	Winners	Score	Opponent	Refs.
22/3/2018	(Argentina) Fernando Belasteguín (Brazil) Pablo Lima	6–3 / 6–3	(Argentina) Aris Patiniotis (Spain) Pedro Alonso Martinez	
22/3/2018	(Brazil) Lucas Bergamini (Brazil) Lucas Campagnolo	7–6 / 6–4	(Spain) Juani Mieres (Argentina) Miguel Lamperti	
22/3/2018	(Argentina) Juan Cruz Belluati (Spain) Juan Lebrón	6–2 / 6–3	(Argentina) Federico Chingotto (Argentina) Juan Tello	
22/3/2018	(Argentina) Agustín Tapia (Brazil) Marcello Jardim	4–6 / 6–0 / 6–1	(Argentina) Lucho Capra (Argentina) Ramiro Moyano	
22/3/2018	(Spain) Juan Martin Díaz (Spain) Paquito Navarro	6–1 / 6–2	(Spain) Gerard Company (Spain) Rubén Rivera	
22/3/2018	(Spain) Alejandro Galán (Spain) Matías Díaz	6–2 / 6–1	(Argentina) Fernando Poggi (Argentina) Gaby Reca	
22/3/2018	(Spain) Javi Ruiz (Spain) Uri Botello	7–5 / 6–1	(Spain) Álvaro Cepero (Argentina) Godo Díaz	
22/3/2018	(Argentina) Maxi Sánchez (Argentina) Sanyo Gutiérrez	7–6 / 6–0	(Argentina) Adrian Allemandi (Argentina) Federico Quiles	

Women's

Date	Winners	Score	Opponent	Refs.
22/3/2018	(Spain) Majo Sanchez (Spain) Mapi Sanchez	6–2 / 6–1	(Spain) Cristina Argemi (Spain) Nuria Rovira	
22/3/2018	(Spain) Carolina Navarro (Argentina) Cecilia Reiter	6–1 / 6–4	(Portugal) Ana Catarina Nogueira (Argentina) Delfina Brea	
22/3/2018	(Spain) Beatriz González (Argentina) Catalina Tenorio	6–1 / 6–1	(France) Alix Collombon (Spain) Sara Pujals	
22/3/2018	(Spain) Gemma Triay (Spain) Lucía Sainz	6–3 / 6–3	(Spain) Isabel Domínguez (Spain) Vanesa Alonso	
22/3/2018	(Spain) Ariana Sánchez (Spain) Marta Ortega	6–4 / 6–2	(Spain) Alba Galán (Spain) Maria Villalba	
22/3/2018	(Spain) Teresa Navarro (Spain) Victoria Iglesias	6–2 / 6–0	(Spain) Cynthia Pérez Domenech (Spain) Noelia Marquez	
22/3/2018	(Spain) Elisabeth Amatriain (Spain) Patricia Llaguno	6–1 / 6–4	(Spain) Ana Fernandez de Ossó (Spain) Maite Gabarrus Alonso	
22/3/2018	(Spain) Alejandra Salazar (Spain) Marta Marrero	6–3 / 6–3	(Spain) Sandra Hernández (Spain) Verónica Virseda	

=== Quarter-Finals ===
Men's

Date	Winners	Score	Opponent	Refs.
23/3/2018	(Argentina) Fernando Belasteguín (Brazil) Pablo Lima	6–1 / 6–2	(Brazil) Lucas Bergamini (Brazil) Lucas Campagnolo	
23/3/2018	(Argentina) Juan Cruz Belluati (Spain) Juan Lebrón	7–6 / 5–7 / 6–4	(Argentina) Agustín Tapia (Brazil) Marcello Jardim	
23/3/2018	(Spain) Alejandro Galán (Spain) Matías Díaz	6–3 / 6–0	(Spain) Juan Martin Díaz (Spain) Paquito Navarro	
23/3/2018	(Argentina) Maxi Sánchez (Argentina) Sanyo Gutiérrez	6–0 / 7–5	(Spain) Javi Ruiz (Spain) Uri Botello	

Women's

Date	Winners	Score	Opponent	Refs.
23/3/2018	(Spain) Majo Sanchez (Spain) Mapi Sanchez	6–1 / 6–4	(Spain) Carolina Navarro (Argentina) Cecilia Reiter	
23/3/2018	(Spain) Gemma Triay (Spain) Lucía Sainz	6–2 / 6–1	(Spain) Beatriz González (Argentina) Catalina Tenorio	
23/3/2018	(Spain) Ariana Sánchez (Spain) Marta Ortega	3–6 / 6–2 / 7–5	(Spain) Teresa Navarro (Spain) Victoria Iglesias	
23/3/2018	(Spain) Alejandra Salazar (Spain) Marta Marrero	4–6 / 7–6 / 6–1	(Spain) Elisabeth Amatriain (Spain) Patricia Llaguno	

=== Semi-Finals ===
Men's

Date	Winners	Score	Opponent	Refs.
24/3/2018	(Argentina) Juan Cruz Belluati (Spain) Juan Lebrón	6–4 / 1–6 / 6–3	(Argentina) Fernando Belasteguín (Brazil) Pablo Lima	
24/3/2018	(Argentina) Maxi Sánchez (Argentina) Sanyo Gutiérrez	6–3 / 6–4	(Spain) Alejandro Galán (Spain) Matías Díaz	

Women's

Date	Winners	Score	Opponent	Refs.
24/3/2018	(Spain) Gemma Triay (Spain) Lucía Sainz	6–4 / 6–7 / 6–2	(Spain) Majo Sanchez (Spain) Mapi Sanchez	
24/3/2018	(Spain) Alejandra Salazar (Spain) Marta Marrero	7–6 / 4–6 / 6–2	(Spain) Ariana Sánchez (Spain) Marta Ortega	

=== Finals ===
Men's

Date	Winners	Score	Opponent	Refs.
25/3/2018	(Argentina) Maxi Sánchez (Argentina) Sanyo Gutiérrez	6–4 / 6–2	(Argentina) Juan Cruz Belluati (Spain) Juan Lebrón	

Women's

Date	Winners	Score	Opponent	Refs.
25/3/2018	(Spain) Gemma Triay (Spain) Lucía Sainz	6–2 / 5–7 / 6–4	(Spain) Alejandra Salazar (Spain) Marta Marrero	
