= 2026 Cancún P2 =

Premier Padel tournament held in Cancún

- Date: 15 – 22 March
- Edition: 2nd
- Category: P2
- Prize money: €264.534
- Location: Cancún, Mexico
- Venue: Rafa Nadal Tennis Center
- Court speed: Fast

Champions
- Men's doubles: (Argentina) Agustín Tapia (Spain) Arturo Coello
- Women's doubles: (Argentina) Delfina Brea (Spain) Gemma Triay

Chronology

The 2026 Cancún P2 (officially 2026 Premier Padel Cancún P2) was the third tournament of the fifth season organized by Premier Padel, the premier padel circuit, promoted by the International Padel Federation, and with the financial backing of Nasser Al-Khelaïfi's Qatar Sports Investments.

In the women's category, the top two FIP ranked pairs faced each other in the final for the first time this season. In the decisive match, Delfina Brea and Gemma Triay defeated Bea González and Paula Josemaría, claiming their second consecutive title of the year.

In the men's category, Juan Lebrón and Leandro Augsburger, the No. 3 ranked FIP pair, broke the streak of eight consecutive finals contested by the top two seeds. In the title match, world No. 1s Agustín Tapia and Arturo Coello defeated Augsburger and Lebrón in three sets, claiming their second title of 2026.

== Relevant Data ==
=== Gemma and Tapia extend their personal record ===
With this tournament, Gemma Triay tied Ariana Sánchez in the number of professional titles (54), sitting just four behind Alejandra Salazar, the most successful player in the history of women's padel.

Meanwhile, Agustín Tapia won his 44th Premier Padel tournament, bringing his total to 55, having secured his first title in Madrid in September 2019 alongside Fernando Belasteguín.

=== Arturo Coello, the King of Mexico ===
The triumph at the Cancún P2 meant that Arturo Coello has won every Premier Padel tournament he has played in Mexico. He won the 2022 Major in Monterrey alongside Fernando Belasteguín, the 2024 Acapulco P1, and the 2024 and 2025 Majors. Now, with the victory in Cancún, the "King" has maintained a 100% record on Mexican soil with 5 wins in 5 tournaments.

=== Coello and Tapia’s Finals Streak ===
By reaching the tournament finals, this time in Cancún, Coello and Tapia secured their tenth consecutive finals appearance on the circuit, extending a streak that has now spanned over 300 days. The last time they were defeated before the deciding match was at the Asunción P2 tournament last season (March 2025), when they lost in the quarterfinals to the Diestro-Esbrí pairing.

== Seeds ==
Male

| Rnk. | Team | FIP Ranking Points |
|---|---|---|
| 1 | (Argentina) Agustín Tapia (Spain) Arturo Coello | 40320 |
| 2 | (Spain) Alejandro Galán (Argentina) Federico Chingotto | 36320 |
| 3 | (Argentina) Franco Stupaczuk (Spain) Mike Yanguas | 13965 |
| 4 | (Spain) Juan Lebrón (Argentina) Leandro Augsburguer | 12850 |
| 5 | (Spain) Coki Nieto (Spain) Jon Sanz | 11357 |
| 6 | (Spain) Francisco Guerrero (Spain) Paquito Navarro | 11320 |
| 7 | (Argentina) Martín Di Nenno (Spain) Momo González | 9370 |
| 8 | (Brazil) Lucas Bergamini (Spain) Javi Garrido | 7555 |
| 9 | (Spain) Eduardo Alonso (Argentina) Juan Tello | 6470 |
| 10 | (Spain) Álvaro Cepero (Spain) Javi Leal | 5200 |
| 11 | (Spain) Javier Barahona (Spain) Javier Garcia Mora | 5075 |
| 12 | (Spain) Alejandro Ruiz (Spain) Juanlu Esbri | 5025 |
| 13 | (Spain) Alejandro Arroyo (Argentina) Leonel Aguirre | 4640 |
| 14 | (Spain) Jairo Bautista (Brazil) Lucas Campagnolo | 4577 |
| 15 | (Argentina) Gonzalo Alfonso (Argentina) Sanyo Gutiérrez | 4286 |
| 16 | (Argentina) Alex Chozas (Argentina) Valentino Libaak | 3753 |

Female

| Rnk. | Team | FIP Ranking Points |
|---|---|---|
| 1 | (Argentina) Delfina Brea (Spain) Gemma Triay | 36600 |
| 2 | (Spain) Bea González (Spain) Paula Josemaria | 26430 |
| 3 | (Spain) Ariana Sánchez (Spain) Andrea Ustero | 22210 |
| 4 | (Spain) Claudia Fernandéz (Portugal) Sofia Araújo | 19740 |
| 5 | (Argentina) Claudia Jensen (Spain) Tamara Icardo | 11995 |
| 6 | (Spain) Marta Ortega (Spain) Martina Calvo | 11000 |
| 7 | (Spain) Alejandra Alonso (Spain) Alejandra Salazar | 10540 |
| 8 | (Spain) Marina Guinart (Spain) Veronica Virseda | 8245 |
| 9 | (Spain) Beatriz Caldera (Spain) Carmen Goenaga | 7210 |
| 10 | (Argentina) Martina Fassio Goyeneche (Spain) Patricia Llaguno | 5455 |
| 11 | (Spain) Jessica Castelló (Spain) Lorena Rufo | 4575 |
| 12 | (Spain) Jimena Velasco (Spain) Marta Barrera | 4140 |
| 13 | (Spain) Maria Rodriguez Abajo (Spain) Noa Canovas | 3340 |
| 14 | (Russia) Ksenia Sharifova (Spain) Marta Borrero | 3312 |
| 15 | (France) Alix Collombon (Spain) Jana Montes Cabruja | 2856 |
| 16 | Ana Catarina Nogueira (Spain) Laura Luján Rodríguez | 2734 |

== Head-to-head record between teams ranked in the top 4 during the season ==
=== Man's ===
| Record | Coello–Tapia | Galán–Chingotto | Stupaczuk–Yanguas | Augsburger–Lebrón |
| Coello–Tapia | — | 1–1 | 1–0 | 2–0 |
| Galán–Chingotto | 1–1 | — | — | — |
| Stupaczuk–Yanguas | 0–1 | — | — | — |
| Augsburger–Lebrón | 0–2 | — | — | — |

=== Women's ===
| Record | D. Brea–Triay | B. González–Paula | Ariana–Ustero | Araúijo–C. Fernandez |
| D. Brea–Triay | — | 1–0 | 1–1 | 1–0 |
| B. González–Paula | 0–1 | — | 0–2 | — |
| Ariana–Ustero | 1–1 | 2–0 | — | — |
| Araúijo–C. Fernandez | 0–1 | — | — | — |

== Draws ==
=== Men's Bracket ===
Round of 32
1 | (Spain) Coello / (Argentina) Tapia
Bye
20 | (Spain) A.F. Lancha / (Spain) J.G. Diestro | 4 | 2
Q | (Argentina) M. Arce / (Spain) P. Lijó | 6 | 6
10 | (Spain) Á. Cepero / (Spain) J. Leal | 6 | 7 | 4
Q | (Spain) A. Goñi / (Spain) E. Goenaga | 7 | 5 | 6
14 | (Spain) J. Bautista / (Brazil) L. Campagnolo | 6 | 6
5 | (Spain) Coki / (Spain) J. Sanz | 2 | 0
6 | (Spain) F. Guerrero / (Spain) Paquito | 6 | 6
Q | (Argentina) L. Capra/ (Spain) V. Ruiz | 3 | 4
WC | (Mexico) P. Iturribarri / (Mexico) P. Hernandez | 2 | 2
13 | (Spain) A. Arroyo / (Argentina) L. Aguirre | 6 | 6
22 | (United Arab Emirates) I. Jofre / (Spain) M. Castaño | 3 | 4
9 | (Spain) E. Alonso / (Argentina) J. Tello | 6 | 6
Bye
3 | (Argentina) Stupaczuk / (Spain) M. Yanguas
4 | (Spain) Lebrón / (Argentina) L. Augsburger
Bye
21 | (Spain) G. Rubio / (Spain) J. Ruiz | 6 | 7
WC | (Mexico) D. Arredondo / (Mexico) J. Padilla | 0 | 6
12 | (Spain) A. Ruiz / (Spain) J. Esbri | 3 | 6 | 7
16 | (Argentina) A. Chozas / (Argentina) V. Libaak | 6 | 1 | 6
18 | (Spain) G. Collado / (Spain) P.H. Alvarez | 7 | 7
7 | (Argentina) Di Nenno / (Spain) Momo | 6 | 6
8 | (Spain) J. Garrido / (Brazil) L. Bergamini | 6 | 6
Q | (Spain) I. Sager / (Argentina) J. Rubini | 4 | 3
19 | (Spain) J.J. Casas / (Argentina) M. Blasco | 3 | 6
15 | (Argentina) G. Alfonso / (Argentina) Sanyo | 6 | 7
17 | (Spain) D.G. Sánchez / (Spain) P.G. Rodrigo | 5 | 2
11 | (Spain) J. Barahona / (Spain) J.G. Mora | 6 | 7
Bye
2 | (Argentina) Chingotto / (Spain) Galán

Round of 16
1 | (Spain) Coello / (Argentina) Tapia | 3 | 6 | 7
Q | (Argentina) M. Arce / (Spain) P. Lijó | 6 | 2 | 6
Q | (Spain) A. Goñi / (Spain) E. Goenaga | 6 | 6
14 | (Spain) J. Bautista / (Brazil) L. Campagnolo | 7 | 7
6 | (Spain) F. Guerrero / (Spain) Paquito | 6 | 3 | 2
13 | (Spain) A. Arroyo / (Argentina) L. Aguirre | 3 | 6 | 6
9 | (Spain) E. Alonso / (Argentina) J. Tello | 3 | 3
3 | (Argentina) Stupaczuk / (Spain) M. Yanguas | 6 | 6
4 | (Spain) Lebrón / (Argentina) L. Augsburger | 6 | 6
21 | (Spain) G. Rubio / (Spain) J. Ruiz | 4 | 2
12 | (Spain) A. Ruiz / (Spain) J. Esbri | 1 | 6 | 3
18 | (Spain) G. Collado / (Spain) P.H. Alvarez | 6 | 3 | 6
8 | (Spain) J. Garrido / (Brazil) L. Bergamini | 3 | 5
15 | (Argentina) G. Alfonso / (Argentina) Sanyo | 6 | 7
11 | (Spain) J. Barahona / (Spain) J.G. Mora | 2 | 4
2 | (Argentina) Chingotto / (Spain) Galán | 6 | 6

Quarter-Final
1 | (Spain) Coello / (Argentina) Tapia | 4 | *
14 | (Spain) J. Bautista / (Brazil) L. Campagnolo | 0
13 | (Spain) A. Arroyo / (Argentina) L. Aguirre | 6 | 6
3 | (Argentina) Stupaczuk / (Spain) M. Yanguas | 3 | 3
4 | (Spain) Lebrón / (Argentina) L. Augsburger | 6 | 6
18 | (Spain) G. Collado / (Spain) P.H. Alvarez | 3 | 1
15 | (Argentina) G. Alfonso / (Argentina) Sanyo | 7 | 6
2 | (Argentina) Chingotto / (Spain) Galán | 5 | 4

Semi-Finals
1 | (Spain) Coello / (Argentina) Tapia | 7 | 6
13 | (Spain) A. Arroyo / (Argentina) L. Aguirre | 6 | 1
4 | (Spain) Lebrón / (Argentina) L. Augsburger | 6 | 6
15 | (Argentina) G. Alfonso / (Argentina) Sanyo | 1 | 2

Finals
1 | (Spain) Coello / (Argentina) Tapia | 6 | 6 | 7
4 | (Spain) Lebrón / (Argentina) L. Augsburger | 7 | 3 | 5

=== Women's Bracket ===
Round of 32
1 | (Argentina) D. Brea / (Spain) G. Triay
Bye
11 | (Spain) J. Castelló / (Spain) L. Rufo | 6 | 6 | 6
17 | (Spain) M. Talavan / (Spain) S. Saiz | 3 | 7 | 4
18 | (Italy) G. Dal Pozzo / (Spain) N. Rodriguez | 7 | 6
10 | (Argentina) M. Goyeneche / (Spain) P. Llaguno | 6 | 1
Bye
5 | (Argentina) C. Jensen / (Spain) T. Icardo
8 | (Spain) M. Guinart / (Spain) V. Virseda
Bye
19 | (Italy) G. Marchetti / (France) L. Godallier | 6 | 6
Q | (Spain) B. Las Heras / (Spain) J. Bautista | 2 | 3
12 | (Spain) M. Barrera / (Spain) J. Velasco | 4 | 6 | 6
16 | (Portugal) A. Nogueira / (Spain) L. Luján | 6 | 1 | 4
Bye
3 | (Spain) A. Ustero / (Spain) A. Sánchez
4 | (Spain) C. Fernández / (Portugal) S. Araújo
Bye
13 | (Spain) M.R. Abajo / (Spain) N. Canovas | 6 | 6
Q | (Spain) A. Gracia / (Spain) C. Casali | 1 | 3
Q | (Spain) A. Sanjuan / (Spain) S. Bellver | 6 | 6
WC | (Mexico) A. Cabrejas / (Mexico) C. Coellar | 1 | 0
Bye
6 | (Spain) M. Ortega / (Spain) M. Calvo
7 | (Spain) A. Salazar / (Spain) A. Alonso
Bye
14 | (Russia) K. Sharifova / (Spain) M. Borrero | 6 | 3 | 6
Q | (Spain) A. Cañellas / (Spain) L. Exposito | 1 | 6 | 7
15 | (France) A. Collombon / (Spain) J. Montes | 2 | 1
9 | (Spain) B. Caldera / (Spain) C. Goenaga | 6 | 6
Bye
2 | (Spain) Bea González / (Spain) P. Josemaria

Round of 16
1 | (Argentina) D. Brea / (Spain) G. Triay | 6 | 6
11 | (Spain) J. Castelló / (Spain) L. Rufo | 2 | 2
18 | (Italy) G. Dal Pozzo / (Spain) N. Rodriguez | 7 | 3 | 6
5 | (Argentina) C. Jensen / (Spain) T. Icardo | 6 | 6 | 3
8 | (Spain) M. Guinart / (Spain) V. Virseda | 6 | 3 | 6
19 | (Italy) G. Marchetti / (France) L. Godallier | 1 | 6 | 2
12 | (Spain) M. Barrera / (Spain) J. Velasco | 3 | 0
3 | (Spain) A. Ustero / (Spain) A. Sánchez | 6 | 6
4 | (Spain) C. Fernández / (Portugal) S. Araújo | 6 | 6 | 6
13 | (Spain) M.R. Abajo / (Spain) N. Canovas | 7 | 2 | 0
Q | (Spain) M.R. Abajo / (Spain) N. Canovas | 2 | 0
6 | (Spain) M. Ortega / (Spain) M. Calvo | 6 | 6
7 | (Spain) A. Salazar / (Spain) A. Alonso | 6 | 6
Q | (Spain) A. Cañellas / (Spain) L. Exposito | 3 | 2
9 | (Spain) B. Caldera / (Spain) C. Goenaga | 6 | 0 | 5
2 | (Spain) Bea González / (Spain) P. Josemaria | 3 | 6 | 7

Quarter-Final
1 | (Argentina) D. Brea / (Spain) G. Triay | 6 | 6
18 | (Italy) G. Dal Pozzo / (Spain) N. Rodriguez | 1 | 1
8 | (Spain) M. Guinart / (Spain) V. Virseda | 7 | 6
3 | (Spain) A. Ustero / (Spain) A. Sánchez | 5 | 3
4 | (Spain) C. Fernández / (Portugal) S. Araújo | 3 | 6 | 4
6 | (Spain) M. Ortega / (Spain) M. Calvo | 6 | 3 | 6
7 | (Spain) A. Salazar / (Spain) A. Alonso | 2 | 2
2 | (Spain) Bea González / (Spain) P. Josemaria | 6 | 6

Semi-Finals
1 | (Argentina) D. Brea / (Spain) G. Triay | 7 | 6
8 | (Spain) M. Guinart / (Spain) V. Virseda | 6 | 1
6 | (Spain) M. Ortega / (Spain) M. Calvo | 2 | 3
2 | (Spain) Bea González / (Spain) P. Josemaria | 6 | 6

Finals
1 | (Argentina) D. Brea / (Spain) G. Triay | 7 | 6
2 | (Spain) Bea González / (Spain) P. Josemaria | 6 | 1

== Results ==
=== Round of 32 ===
Men's

| Date | Winners | Score | Opponent | Refs. |
|---|---|---|---|---|
| 18/3/2026 | (Argentina) Maximiliano Arce (Spain) Pablo Lijó | 6–4 / 6–2 | (Spain) Andres Fernandez Lancha (Spain) Jose García Diestro | |
| 18/3/2026 | (Spain) Aimar Goñi (Spain) Enrique Goenaga | 7–6 / 5–7 / 6–4 | (Spain) Alvaro Cepero (Spain) Javi Leal | |
| 18/3/2026 | (Spain) Jairo Bautista (Brazil) Lucas Campagnolo | 6–2 / 6–0 | (Spain) Coki Nieto (Spain) Jon Sanz | |
| 18/3/2026 | (Spain) Francisco Guerrero (Spain) Paquito Navarro | 6–3 / 6–4 | (Argentina) Luciano Capra (Spain) Victor Ruiz | |
| 17/3/2026 | (Spain) Alex Arroyo (Argentina) Leonel Aguirre | 6–2 / 6–2 | (Mexico) Pablo Acevedo Iturribarria (Mexico) Pablo Francisco Amora | |
| 17/3/2026 | (Spain) Eduardo Alonso (Argentina) Juan Tello | 6–3 / 6–4 | (United Arab Emirates) Iñigo Jofre (Spain) Manuel Castaño | |
| 18/3/2026 | (Spain) Gonzalo Rubio (Spain) Javi Ruiz | 6–0 / 7–6 | (Mexico) Diego Arredondo García (Mexico) Jose Pablo Padilla | |
| 18/3/2026 | (Spain) Aléx Ruiz (Spain) Juanlu Esbri | 3–6 / 6–1 / 7–6 | (Argentina) Alex Chozas (Argentina) Valentino Libaak | |
| 18/3/2026 | (Spain) Guillermo Collado (Spain) Pol Hernandez | 7–6 / 7–6 | (Argentina) Martin Di Nenno (Spain) Momo González | |
| 18/3/2026 | (Spain) Javier Garrido (Brazil) Lucas Bergamini | 6–4 / 6–3 | (Spain) Ignacio Sager (Argentina) Juan Ignacio Rubini | |
| 17/3/2026 | (Argentina) Gonzalo Alfonso (Argentina) Sanyo Gutiérrez | 6–3 / 7–6 | (Spain) Jose Jimenez Casas (Argentina) Maxi Sanchez Blasco | |
| 17/3/2026 | (Spain) Javier Barahona (Spain) Javier Garcia Mora | 7–5 / 6–2 | (Spain) David Gala Sánchez (Spain) Pablo García Rodrigo | |

Women's

| Date | Winners | Score | Opponent | Refs. |
|---|---|---|---|---|
| 18/3/2026 | (Spain) Jessica Castelló (Spain) Lorena Rufo | 6–3 / 6–7 / 6–4 | (Spain) Marta Talavan (Spain) Sofía Saiz Vallejo | |
| 18/3/2026 | (Italy) Giulia Dal Pozzo (Spain) Nuria Rodriguez Camacho | 7–6 / 6–1 | (Argentina) Martina Fassio Goyeneche (Spain) Patricia Llaguno | |
| 18/3/2026 | (Italy) Giorgia Marchetti (France) Lea Godallier | 6–2 / 6–3 | (Spain) Barbara Las Heras (Spain) Julia Polo Bautista | |
| 18/3/2026 | (Spain) Jimena Velasco (Spain) Marta Barrera | 4–6 / 6–1 / 6–4 | (Portugal) Ana Catarina Nogueira (Spain) Laura Luján | |
| 18/3/2026 | (Spain) Laia Rodriguez Abajo (Spain) Noa Canovas | 6–1 / 6–3 | (Spain) Ana Dominguez Gracia (Italy) Carlotta Casali | |
| 18/3/2026 | (Spain) Aida Martinez Sanjuan (Spain) Sandra Bellver | 6–1 / 6–0 | (Mexico) Ana Maria Cabrejas (Mexico) Camila Ramme Coellar | |
| 18/3/2026 | (Spain) Ariadna Cañellas Rodero (Spain) Lucia Peralta Exposito | 1–6 / 6–3 / 7–6 | (Russia) Ksenia Sharifova (Spain) Marta Borrero | |
| 18/3/2026 | (Spain) Beatriz Caldera (Spain) Carmen Goenaga | 6–2 / 6–1 | (France) Alix Collombon (Spain) Jana Montes | |

=== Round of 16 ===
Men's

| Date | Winners | Score | Opponent | Refs. |
|---|---|---|---|---|
| 19/3/2026 | (Argentina) Agustín Tapia (Spain) Arturo Coello | 3–6 / 6–2 / 7–6 | (Argentina) Maximiliano Arce (Spain) Pablo Lijó | |
| 19/3/2026 | (Spain) Jairo Bautista (Brazil) Lucas Campagnolo | 7–6 / 7–6 | (Spain) Aimar Goñi (Spain) Enrique Goenaga | |
| 19/3/2026 | (Spain) Alex Arroyo (Argentina) Leonel Aguirre | 3–6 / 6–3 / 6–2 | (Spain) Francisco Guerrero (Spain) Paquito Navarro | |
| 19/3/2026 | (Argentina) Franco Stupaczuk (Spain) Miguel Yanguas | 6–3 / 6–3 | (Spain) Eduardo Alonso (Argentina) Juan Tello | |
| 19/3/2026 | (Spain) Juan Lebrón (Argentina) Leandro Augsburger | 6–4 / 6–2 | (Spain) Gonzalo Rubio (Spain) Javi Ruiz | |
| 19/3/2026 | (Spain) Guillermo Collado (Spain) Pol Hernandez | 6–1 / 3–6 / 6–3 | (Spain) Aléx Ruiz (Spain) Juanlu Esbri | |
| 19/3/2026 | (Argentina) Gonzalo Alfonso (Argentina) Sanyo Gutiérrez | 6–3 / 7–5 | (Spain) Javier Garrido (Brazil) Lucas Bergamini | |
| 19/3/2026 | (Spain) Alejandro Galán (Argentina) Federico Chingotto | 6–2 / 6–4 | (Spain) Javier Barahona (Spain) Javier Garcia Mora | |

Women's

| Date | Winners | Score | Opponent | Refs. |
|---|---|---|---|---|
| 19/3/2026 | (Argentina) Delfina Brea (Spain) Gemma Triay | 6–2 / 6–2 | (Spain) Jessica Castelló (Spain) Lorena Rufo | |
| 19/3/2026 | (Italy) Giulia Dal Pozzo (Spain) Nuria Rodriguez Camacho | 7–6 / 3–6 / 6–3 | (Argentina) Claudia Jensen (Spain) Tamara Icardo | |
| 19/3/2026 | (Spain) Marina Guinart (Spain) Verónica Virseda | 6–1 / 3–6 / 6–2 | (Italy) Giorgia Marchetti (France) Lea Godallier | |
| 19/3/2026 | (Spain) Andrea Ustero (Spain) Ariana Sánchez | 6–3 / 6–0 | (Spain) Jimena Velasco (Spain) Marta Barrera | |
| 19/3/2026 | (Spain) Claudia Fernández (Portugal) Sofia Araújo | 6–7 / 6–2 / 6–0 | (Spain) Laia Rodriguez Abajo (Spain) Noa Canovas | |
| 19/3/2026 | (Spain) Marta Ortega (Spain) Martina Calvo | 6–2 / 6–0 | (Spain) Aida Martinez Sanjuan (Spain) Sandra Bellver | |
| 19/3/2026 | (Spain) Alejandra Alonso (Spain) Alejandra Salazar | 6–3 / 6–2 | (Spain) Ariadna Cañellas Rodero (Spain) Lucia Peralta Exposito | |
| 19/3/2026 | (Spain) Bea González (Spain) Paula Josemaría | 3–6 / 6–0 / 7–5 | (Spain) Beatriz Caldera (Spain) Carmen Goenaga | |

=== Quarter-Finals ===
Men's

| Date | Winners | Score | Opponent | Refs. |
|---|---|---|---|---|
| 20/3/2026 | (Argentina) Agustín Tapia (Spain) Arturo Coello | 4–0 / W.O | (Spain) Jairo Bautista (Brazil) Lucas Campagnolo | |
| 20/3/2026 | (Spain) Alex Arroyo (Argentina) Leonel Aguirre | 6–3 / 6–3 | (Argentina) Franco Stupaczuk (Spain) Miguel Yanguas | |
| 20/3/2026 | (Spain) Juan Lebrón (Argentina) Leandro Augsburger | 6–3 / 6–1 | (Spain) Guillermo Collado (Spain) Pol Hernandez | |
| 20/3/2026 | (Argentina) Gonzalo Alfonso (Argentina) Sanyo Gutiérrez | 7–5 / 6–4 | (Spain) Alejandro Galán (Argentina) Federico Chingotto | |

Women's

| Date | Winners | Score | Opponent | Refs. |
|---|---|---|---|---|
| 20/3/2026 | (Argentina) Delfina Brea (Spain) Gemma Triay | 6–1 / 6–1 | (Italy) Giulia Dal Pozzo (Spain) Nuria Rodriguez Camacho | |
| 20/3/2026 | (Spain) Marina Guinart (Spain) Verónica Virseda | 7–5 / 6–3 | (Spain) Andrea Ustero (Spain) Ariana Sánchez | |
| 20/3/2026 | (Spain) Marta Ortega (Spain) Martina Calvo | 6–3 / 3–6 / 6–4 | (Spain) Claudia Fernández (Portugal) Sofia Araújo | |
| 20/3/2026 | (Spain) Bea González (Spain) Paula Josemaría | 6–2 / 6–2 | (Spain) Alejandra Alonso (Spain) Alejandra Salazar | |

=== Semi-Finals ===
Men's

| Date | Winners | Score | Opponent | Refs. |
|---|---|---|---|---|
| 21/3/2026 | (Argentina) Agustín Tapia (Spain) Arturo Coello | 7–6 / 6–1 | (Spain) Alex Arroyo (Argentina) Leonel Aguirre | |
| 21/3/2026 | (Spain) Juan Lebrón (Argentina) Leandro Augsburger | 6–1 / 6–2 | (Argentina) Gonzalo Alfonso (Argentina) Sanyo Gutiérrez | |

Women's

| Date | Winners | Score | Opponent | Refs. |
|---|---|---|---|---|
| 21/3/2026 | (Argentina) Delfina Brea (Spain) Gemma Triay | 7–6 / 6–1 | (Spain) Marina Guinart (Spain) Verónica Virseda | |
| 21/3/2026 | (Spain) Bea González (Spain) Paula Josemaría | 6–2 / 6–3 | (Spain) Marta Ortega (Spain) Martina Calvo | |

=== Finals ===
Men's

| Date | Winners | Score | Opponent | Refs. |
|---|---|---|---|---|
| 22/3/2026 | (Argentina) Agustín Tapia (Spain) Arturo Coello | 6–7 / 6–3 / 7–5 | (Spain) Juan Lebrón (Argentina) Leandro Augsburger | |

Women's

| Date | Winners | Score | Opponent | Refs. |
|---|---|---|---|---|
| 22/3/2026 | (Argentina) Delfina Brea (Spain) Gemma Triay | 7–6 / 6–1 | (Spain) Bea González (Spain) Paula Josemaría | |
