= 2024 Rotterdam P1 =

Padel championships

- Date: 8 – 15 September
- Edition: 1st
- Category: P1
- Prize money: €470.000
- Location: Rotterdam, Netherlands
- Venue: Rotterdam Ahoy

Champions
- Men's doubles: (Argentina) Agustín Tapia (Spain) Arturo Coello
- Women's doubles: (Spain) Ariana Sánchez (Spain) Paula Josemaría

Chronology

The 2024 Rotterdam P1 (officially 2024 Rotterdam Premier Padel P1) was the sixteenth tournament, and the second after the summer break, of the third season organized by Premier Padel, promoted by the International Padel Federation, and with the financial backing of Nasser Al-Khelaïfi's Qatar Sports Investments, now serving as the premier padel circuit.

In the women's category, Claudia Fernández and Gemma Triay reached their eighth final of the season, aiming to even their finals record at 4–4 and break their 4–4 head-to-head record against world No. 1s Ariana Sánchez and Paula Josemaría. The No. 1s ultimately won in straight sets, securing their 34th title.

In the men's category, the top two pairs in the FIP rankings faced each other in a final for the tenth time, with Agustín Tapia and Arturo Coello defeating Alejandro Galán and Federico Chingotto to claim their eight title in 2024.

== Relevant Data ==
=== Climbing the rankings ===
With the surprising performance of Augsburger and Chozas, eliminating Di Nenno/Lebrón (3rd seeds) and Coki/Sanz (8th seeds) en route to the semifinals, the Argentine pair climbed four spots as a pair in the rankings.

=== No Bea and Delfi ===
Due to Bea González's injury, the number 3 pair was unable to compete in the tournament, despite having registered for it.

== Seeds ==
Male

Rnk.	Team	FIP Ranking Points
1	(Argentina) Agustín Tapia (Spain) Arturo Coello	25470
2	(Spain) Alejandro Galán (Argentina) Federico Chingotto	21663
3	(Spain) Juan Lebrón (Argentina) Martin Di Nenno	16532
4	(Argentina) Franco Stupaczuk (Spain) Miguel Yanguas	11404
5	(Spain) Pablo Cardona (Spain) Paquito Navarro	8409
6	(Spain) Aléx Ruiz (Spain) Javi Garrido	7213
7	(Argentina) Fernando Belasteguín (Argentina) Juan Tello	6801
8	(Spain) Coki Nieto (Spain) Jon Sanz	6621
9	(Spain) Eduardo Alonso (Spain) Momo Gonzalez	6302
10	(Spain) Alejandro Arroyo (Argentina) Sanyo Gutiérrez	5752
11	(Argentina) Lucho Capra (Argentina) Maxi Sanchéz	4110
12	(Spain) Juanlu Esbri (Brazil) Lucas Bergamini	3508
13	(Spain) Javier Leal (Brazil) Lucas Campagnolo	3430
14	(Argentina) Valentino Libaak (Spain) Victor Ruiz	2954
15	(Spain) Javier Barahona (Spain) Teodoro Zapata	2463
16	(Spain) Gonzalo Rubio (Spain) Pablo Lijó	2429

Female

Rnk.	Team	FIP Ranking Points
1	(Spain) Ariana Sanchez (Spain) Paula Josemaria	26306
2	(Spain) Claudia Fernandez (Spain) Gemma Triay	15437
3	(Spain) Beatriz Gonzalez (Argentina) Delfina Brea	15297
4	(Spain) Marta Ortega (Portugal) Sofia Araújo	10598
5	(Spain) Alejandra Salazar (Spain) Jessica Castello	9326
6	(Spain) Lucia Sainz (Spain) Patty Llaguno	9261
7	(Argentina) Aranzazu Osoro (Spain) Veronica Virseda	6422
8	(Spain) Carmen Goenaga (Argentina) Virginia Riera	5540
9	(Argentina) Claudia Jensen (Spain) Teresa Navarro	5485
10	(Italy) Carolina Orsi (Spain) Nuria Rodriguez	3274
11	(Spain) Beatriz Caldera (Spain) Lorena Rufo	3169
12	(Russia) Ksenia Sharifova (Spain) Lucia Martinez	3061
13	(Spain) Marina Guinart (Spain) Victoria Iglesias	2963
14	(France) Alix Collombon (Spain) Araceli Martinez	2434
15	(Spain) Carla Mesa (Spain) Sara Ruiz	2419
16	(Spain) Barbara Las Heras (Spain) Marta Marrero	2384

== Head-to-head record between teams ranked in the top 4 during the season ==
=== Man's ===
Record	Coello–Tapia	Galán–Chingotto	Lebrón–Di Nenno	Stupaczuk–Yanguas	Former Pairs	Galán–Lebrón	Paquito–Sanyo	Lebrón–Paquito	Di Nenno–Stupaczuk
Coello–Tapia	—	6–5	1–0	—		1–1	2–0	4–0	1–0
Galán–Chingotto	5–6	—	—	1–0		—	—	1–0	7–0
Lebrón–Di Nenno	0–1	—	—	—		—	—	—	—
Stupaczuk–Yanguas	—	0–1	—	—		—	—	—	—
Former Pairs									
Galán–Lebrón	1–1	—	—	—		—	—	—	2–0
Paquito–Sanyo	0–2	—	—	—		—	—	—	—
Lebrón–Paquito	0–4	0–1	—	—		—	—	—	0–1
Di Nenno–Stupaczuk	0–1	0–7	—	—		0–2	—	1–0	—

=== Women's ===
Record	Ariana–Paula	Fernandez–Triay	Gonzalez–D. Brea	Araújo–Ortega	Former Pairs	Icardo–Salazar	Ortega–Triay	Ortega–Virseda
Ariana–Paula	—	5–4	2–1	1–1		1–0	—	1–0
Fernandez–Triay	4–5	—	2–3	1–0		0–1	—	1–0
B. Gonzalez–D. Brea	1–2	3–2	—	1–0		3–0	—	—
Araújo–Ortega	1–1	0–1	0–1	—		—	—	—
Former Pairs								
Icardo–Salazar	0–1	1–0	0–3	—		—	—	—
Ortega–Triay	—	—	—	—		—	—	—
Ortega–Virseda	0–1	0–1	—	—		—	—	—

== Draws ==
=== Men's Bracket ===
Round of 32
1	(Spain) Coello / (Argentina) Tapia	6	7
Q	(Portugal) A. Luque / (Spain) T. Bueno	1	5
Q	(Spain) G. Losada / (Spain) J. Martinez	6	6	6
16	(Spain) G. Rubio / (Spain) P. Lijó	7	3	2
14	(Argentina) V. Libaak / (Spain) V. Ruiz	6	6
Q	(Argentina) F. Mouriño / (Spain) M. Quilez	4	4
24	(Spain) J.J. Casas / (Spain) P. Fernandez	3	6
6	(Spain) A. Ruiz / (Spain) J. Garrido	6	7
8	(Spain) Coki / (Spain) J. Sanz	6	6
17	(Spain) I. Sager / (Spain) S. Oria	3	1
29	(Spain) E. Chamero / (Italy) F. Dominguez	4	4
10	(Spain) A. Arroyo / (Argentina) Sanyo	6	6
12	(Spain) J. Esbri / (Brazil) L. Bergamini	4	5
20	(Argentina) A. Chozas / (Argentina) L. Augsburger	6	7
19	(Spain) J. Rico / (Spain) R. Mendez	0	7	2
3	(Argentina) Di Nenno / (Spain) Lebrón	6	6	6
4	(Argentina) Stupaczuk / (Spain) Yanguas	6	6
21	(Argentina) A. Gutiérrez / (Spain) J. Rico	0	2
Q	(Spain) A. Berdonce / (Spain) G. Serrano	1	2
11	(Argentina) L. Capra / (Argentina) Maxi	6	6
15	(Spain) J. Barahona / (Spain) T. Zapata	7	0	3
Q	(Italy) A. Patiniotis / (Spain) J. Moya	5	6	6
32	(Spain) J. Ruiz / (Spain) M. Semmler	7	6	1
7	(Argentina) Belasteguin / (Argentina) J. Tello	6	7	6
5	(Spain) P. Cardona / (Spain) Paquito	6	6
Q	(Spain) I. Vilariño / (Spain) M. Del Castillo	3	3
26	(Spain) A. Cepero / (Spain) M. Benitez	6	7
13	(Spain) J. Leal / (Brazil) L. Campagnolo	4	5
9	(Spain) E. Alonso / (Spain) Momo	6	6
23	(Spain) A. Ayats / (Spain) E. Goenaga	1	0
Q	(Spain) P. Alvarez / (Argentina) R. Valenzuela	4	6
2	(Spain) Galán / (Argentina) F. Chingotto	6	7

Round of 16
1	(Spain) Coello / (Argentina) Tapia	6	6
Q	(Spain) G. Losada / (Spain) J. Martinez	3	2
14	(Argentina) V. Libaak / (Spain) V. Ruiz	3	4
6	(Spain) A. Ruiz / (Spain) J. Garrido	6	6
8	(Spain) Coki / (Spain) J. Sanz	6	7
10	(Spain) A. Arroyo / (Argentina) Sanyo	3	5
20	(Argentina) A. Chozas / (Argentina) L. Augsburger	1	7	6
3	(Argentina) Di Nenno / (Spain) Lebrón	6	6	4
4	(Argentina) Stupaczuk / (Spain) Yanguas	5	6	6
11	(Argentina) L. Capra / (Argentina) Maxi	7	1	2
Q	(Italy) A. Patiniotis / (Spain) J. Moya	1	4
7	(Argentina) Belasteguin / (Argentina) J. Tello	6	6
5	(Spain) P. Cardona / (Spain) Paquito	6	6
26	(Spain) A. Cepero / (Spain) M. Benitez	1	3
9	(Spain) E. Alonso / (Spain) Momo	2	2
2	(Spain) Galán / (Argentina) F. Chingotto	6	6

Quarter-Final
1	(Spain) Coello / (Argentina) Tapia	6	6
6	(Spain) A. Ruiz / (Spain) J. Garrido	3	1
8	(Spain) Coki / (Spain) J. Sanz	6	6	4
20	(Argentina) A. Chozas / (Argentina) L. Augsburger	3	7	6
4	(Argentina) Stupaczuk / (Spain) Yanguas	6	4	6
7	(Argentina) Belasteguin / (Argentina) J. Tello	2	6	3
5	(Spain) P. Cardona / (Spain) Paquito	2	2
2	(Spain) Galán / (Argentina) F. Chingotto	6	6

Semi-Finals
1	(Spain) Coello / (Argentina) Tapia	7	6
20	(Argentina) A. Chozas / (Argentina) L. Augsburger	6	2
4	(Argentina) Stupaczuk / (Spain) Yanguas	5	3
2	(Spain) Galán / (Argentina) F. Chingotto	7	6

Finals
1	(Spain) Coello / (Argentina) Tapia	6	6
2	(Spain) Galán / (Argentina) F. Chingotto	2	2

=== Women's Bracket ===
Round of 32
1	(Spain) A. Sanchez / (Spain) P. Josemaria	6	6
21	(Spain) M. Lobo / (Spain) S. Saiz	1	4
22	(Spain) M.R. Abajo / (Spain) S. Bellver	1	7	4
24	(Spain) A. Perez / (Spain) P. Martinez	6	6	6
10	(Italy) C. Orsi / (Spain) N. Rodriguez	6	6
Q	(Spain) N. Vivancos / (Spain) X. Vidiella	1	4
19	(Spain) E. Carnicero / (Spain) M. Merino	6	2
7	(Argentina) A. Osoro / (Spain) V. Virseda	7	6
6	(Spain) L. Sainz / (Spain) P. Llaguno	6	6
25	(Spain) M. Barrera / (Spain) M. Caparros	3	4
20	(Spain) J. Velasco / (Spain) N. Canovas	3	4
11	(Spain) B. Caldera / (Spain) L. Rufo	6	6
18	(Argentina) J. Bidahorria / (Spain) M. Talavan	6	6
Q	(Italy) E. Stellato / (Italy) G. Sussarello	1	0
14	(France) A. Collombon / (Spain) A. Martinez	7	1	3
5	(Spain) A. Salazar / (Spain) J. Castello	6	6	6
4	(Spain) M. Ortega / (Portugal) S. Araújo	6	6
15	(Spain) C. Mesa / (Spain) S. Ruiz	2	4
26	(Italy) G. Marchetti / (France) L. Godallier	6	6
27	(Spain) M. Portillo / (Spain) M. Borrero	1	3
13	(Spain) M. Guinart / (Spain) V. Iglesias	6	6
WC	(Netherlands) M. Koek / (Netherlands) S. Weterings	1	3
LL	(Brazil) M. Schuck / (Spain) M. Rivas	6	1
9	(Argentina) C. Jensen / (Spain) T. Navarro	7	6
8	(Spain) C. Goenaga / (Argentina) V. Riera	3	6
Q	(Spain) J. Bautista / (Spain) L. Arruabarrena	7	6
12	(Russia) K. Sharifova / (Spain) L. Martinez	7	6
Q	(Spain) C. Castillon / (Portugal) P. Ribeiro	5	1
17	(Spain) A. Ustero / (Spain) M. Santamaria	6	6
16	(Spain) B. Las Heras / (Spain) M. Marrero	4	4
23	(Spain) A. Cañellas / (Sweden) C. Navarro	1	1
2	(Spain) C. Fernandez / (Spain) G. Triay	6	6

Round of 16
1	(Spain) A. Sanchez / (Spain) P. Josemaria	6	6
24	(Spain) A. Perez / (Spain) P. Martinez	0	4
10	(Italy) C. Orsi / (Spain) N. Rodriguez	3	4
7	(Argentina) A. Osoro / (Spain) V. Virseda	6	6
6	(Spain) L. Sainz / (Spain) P. Llaguno	7	6
11	(Spain) B. Caldera / (Spain) L. Rufo	5	3
18	(Argentina) J. Bidahorria / (Spain) M. Talavan	2	3
5	(Spain) A. Salazar / (Spain) J. Castello	6	6
4	(Spain) M. Ortega / (Portugal) S. Araújo	6	6
26	(Italy) G. Marchetti / (France) L. Godallier	2	3
13	(Spain) M. Guinart / (Spain) V. Iglesias	6	6	1
9	(Argentina) C. Jensen / (Spain) T. Navarro	7	2	0
Q	(Spain) J. Bautista / (Spain) L. Arruabarrena	3	2
12	(Russia) K. Sharifova / (Spain) L. Martinez	6	6
17	(Spain) A. Ustero / (Spain) M. Santamaria	1	3
2	(Spain) C. Fernandez / (Spain) G. Triay	6	6

Quarter-Final
1	(Spain) A. Sanchez / (Spain) P. Josemaria	6	6
7	(Argentina) A. Osoro / (Spain) V. Virseda	2	1
6	(Spain) L. Sainz / (Spain) P. Llaguno	6	6
5	(Spain) A. Salazar / (Spain) J. Castello	4	3
4	(Spain) M. Ortega / (Portugal) S. Araújo	6	6
13	(Spain) M. Guinart / (Spain) V. Iglesias	3	1
12	(Russia) K. Sharifova / (Spain) L. Martinez	3	3
2	(Spain) C. Fernandez / (Spain) G. Triay	6	6

Semi-Finals
1	(Spain) A. Sanchez / (Spain) P. Josemaria	6	6
6	(Spain) L. Sainz / (Spain) P. Llaguno	1	3
4	(Spain) M. Ortega / (Portugal) S. Araújo	4	3
2	(Spain) C. Fernandez / (Spain) G. Triay	6	6

Finals
1	(Spain) A. Sanchez / (Spain) P. Josemaria	6	6
2	(Spain) C. Fernandez / (Spain) G. Triay	4	4

== Results ==
=== First Round ===
Men's

Date	Winners	Score	Opponent	Refs.
10/9/2024	(Spain) Antonio Luque (Spain) Toni Bueno	6–4 / 6–4	(Spain) Ivan Ramirez (Spain) José Solano Marmolejo	
10/9/2024	(Spain) Guillermo Collado (Spain) Javi Martinez Vazquez	7–6 / 7–5	(Spain) Inigo Jofre (Spain) Luis Hernandez Quesada	
10/9/2024	(Argentina) Federico Mouriño (Spain) Marc Quilez	4–6 / 6–1 / 6–4	(Sweden) Daniel Windahl (Chile) Javier Valdes	
10/9/2024	(Spain) José Jimenez Casas (Spain) Pincho Fernandez	6–2 / 6–7 / 6–3	(Spain) Pablo Castillo Valverde (Spain) Pablo García Rodrigo	
10/9/2024	(Spain) Ignacio Sager (Spain) Salvador Oria	6–7 / 6–4 / 6–2	(Argentina) Juan Cruz Belluati (Argentina) Ramiro Moyano	
10/9/2024	(Spain) Emilio Sanchez Chamero (Italy) Facundo Dominguez	6–4 / 7–6	(Spain) Andres Fernandez Lancha (Spain) Jose García Diestro	
10/9/2024	(Argentina) Alex Chozas (Argentina) Leandro Augsburger	6–4 / 6–2	(Netherlands) Bran Meijer (Netherlands) Sten Richters	
10/9/2024	(Spain) Javi Rico (Spain) Rafael Méndez	6–4 / 6–7 / 7–6	(Spain) Carlos Marti (Argentina) Cristian German Gutiérrez	
10/9/2024	(Argentina) Agustin Gutiérrez (Spain) José Rico	6–2 / 6–3	(Spain) Diego Gil Batista (Spain) Jose Sanchez Serrano	
10/9/2024	(Spain) Adrian Marques (Spain) Gerard Arnaldos	6–3 / 7–6	(Netherlands) Thijs Roper (Netherlands) Youp De Kroon	
10/9/2024	(Italy) Aris Patiniotis (Spain) Jesus Moya	6–3 / 6–4	(Spain) Aitor Garcia Bassas (Spain) Miguel Angel Solbes	
10/9/2024	(Spain) Jorge Ruiz Gutiérrez (Spain) Miguel Semmler	3–6 / 7–5 / 6–3	(Spain) Antón Sans (Spain) David Gala Sanchez	
10/9/2024	(Spain) Ignacio Vilariño (Spain) Mario Del Castillo	6–2 / 7–6	(Spain) Javier García Mora (Spain) Jaime Muñoz	
10/9/2024	(Spain) Alvero Cepero (Spain) Miguel Benítez	6–2 / 6–2	(Italy) Denis Perino (Argentina) Miguel Lamperti	
10/9/2024	(Spain) Arnau Ayats (Spain) Enrique Goenaga	6–4 / 7–6	(Spain) Fran Ramirez (Spain) Victor Mena Gil	
10/9/2024	(Spain) Pol Hernandez (Argentina) Ramiro Valenzuela	7–6 / 6–1	(Netherlands) Bart Van Opstal (Netherlands) Menno Nolten	

=== Round of 32 ===
Men's

Date	Winners	Score	Opponent	Refs.
11/9/2024	(Argentina) Agustín Tapia (Spain) Arturo Coello	6–1 / 7–5	(Spain) Antonio Luque (Spain) Toni Bueno	
11/9/2024	(Spain) Guillermo Collado (Spain) Javi Martinez Vazquez	6–7 / 6–3 / 6–2	(Spain) Gonzalo Rubio (Spain) Pablo Lijó	
11/9/2024	(Argentina) Valentino Libaak (Spain) Victor Ruiz	6–4 / 6–4	(Argentina) Federico Mouriño (Spain) Marc Quilez	
11/9/2024	(Spain) Alex Ruiz (Spain) Javi Garrido	6–3 / 7–6	(Spain) José Jimenez Casas (Spain) Pincho Fernandez	
11/9/2024	(Spain) Coki Nieto (Spain) Jon Sanz	6–3 / 6–1	(Spain) Ignacio Sager (Spain) Salvador Oria	
11/9/2024	(Spain) Alejandro Arroyo (Argentina) Sanyo Gutiérrez	6–4 / 6–4	(Spain) Emilio Sanchez Chamero (Italy) Facundo Dominguez	
11/9/2024	(Argentina) Alex Chozas (Argentina) Leandro Augsburger	6–4 / 7–5	(Spain) Juanlu Esbri (Brazil) Lucas Bergamini	
11/9/2024	(Spain) Juan Lebrón (Argentina) Martin Di Nenno	6–0 / 6–7 / 6–2	(Spain) Javi Rico (Spain) Rafael Méndez	
11/9/2024	(Argentina) Franco Stupaczuk (Spain) Miguel Yanguas	6–0 / 6–2	(Argentina) Agustin Gutiérrez (Spain) José Rico	
11/9/2024	(Argentina) Lucho Capra (Argentina) Maxi Sánchez	6–1 / 6–2	(Spain) Adrian Marques (Spain) Gerard Arnaldos	
11/9/2024	(Italy) Aris Patiniotis (Spain) Jesus Moya	5–7 / 6–0 / 6–3	(Spain) Javier Gonzalez Barahona (Spain) Teodoro Zapata	
11/9/2024	(Argentina) Fernando Belasteguín (Argentina) Juan Ignacio Tello	6–7 / 7–6 / 6–1	(Spain) Jorge Ruiz Gutiérrez (Spain) Miguel Semmler	
11/9/2024	(Spain) Pablo Cardona (Spain) Paquito Navarro	6–3 / 6–3	(Spain) Ignacio Vilariño (Spain) Mario Del Castillo	
11/9/2024	(Spain) Alvero Cepero (Spain) Miguel Benítez	6–4 / 7–5	(Spain) Javier Leal (Brazil) Lucas Campagnolo	
11/9/2024	(Spain) Eduardo Alonso (Spain) Momo Gonzalez	6–1 / 6–0	(Spain) Arnau Ayats (Spain) Enrique Goenaga	
11/9/2024	(Spain) Alejandro Galán (Argentina) Federico Chingotto	6–4 / 7–6	(Spain) Pol Hernandez (Argentina) Ramiro Valenzuela	

Women's

Date	Winners	Score	Opponent	Refs.
11/9/2024	(Spain) Ariana Sánchez (Spain) Paula Josemaria	6–1 / 6–4	(Spain) Marina Martinez Lobo (Spain) Sofía Saiz Vallejo	
11/9/2024	(Spain) Agueda Perez (Spain) Patricia Martínez	6–1 / 6–7 / 6–4	(Spain) Laia Rodriguez Abajo (Spain) Sandra Bellver	
11/9/2024	(Italy) Carolina Orsi (Spain) Nuria Rodriguez	6–1 / 6–4	(Spain) Nuria Vivancos (Spain) Xenia Clasca	
11/9/2024	(Argentina) Aranzazu Osoro (Spain) Veronica Virseda	7–6 / 6–2	(Spain) Esther Carnicero (Spain) Melania Merino Saez	
11/9/2024	(Spain) Lucia Sainz (Spain) Patricia Llaguno	6–3 / 6–4	(Spain) Marta Barrera (Spain) Marta Caparrós	
10/9/2024	(Spain) Beatriz Caldera (Spain) Lorena Rufo	6–3 / 6–4	(Spain) Jimena Velasco (Spain) Noa Canovas	
11/9/2024	(Argentina) Julieta Bidahorria (Spain) Marta Talavan	6–1 / 6–0	(Italy) Emily Stellato (Italy) Giulia Sussarello	
11/9/2024	(Spain) Alejandra Salazar (Spain) Jessica Castelló	6–7 / 6–1 / 6–3	(France) Alix Collombon (Spain) Araceli Martinez	
11/9/2024	(Spain) Marta Ortega (Portugal) Sofia Araújo	6–2 / 6–4	(Spain) Carla Mesa (Spain) Sara Ruiz Soto	
10/9/2024	(Italy) Giorgia Marchetti (France) Lea Godallier	6–1 / 6–3	(Spain) María Portillo (Spain) Marta Borrero	
10/9/2024	(Spain) Marina Guinart (Spain) Victoria Iglesias	6–1 / 6–3	(Netherlands) Marcella Koek (Netherlands) Steffie Weterings	
11/9/2024	(Argentina) Claudia Jensen (Spain) Teresa Navarro	7–6 / 6–1	(Brazil) Manuela Schuck (Spain) Mónica Gomez Rivas	
11/9/2024	(Spain) Julia Polo Bautista (Spain) Lara Arruabarrena	6–3 / 7–6	(Spain) Carmen Goenaga (Argentina) Virginia Riera	
10/9/2024	(Russia) Ksenia Sharifova (Spain) Lucía Martínez Gomez	7–5 / 6–1	(Spain) Carmen Castillon (Portugal) Patricia Ribeiro	
10/9/2024	(Spain) Andrea Ustero (Spain) Martina Calvo	6–4 / 6–4	(Spain) Barbara Las Heras (Spain) Marta Marrero	
11/9/2024	(Spain) Claudia Fernandez (Spain) Gemma Triay	6–1 / 6–1	(Spain) Ariadna Cañellas (Sweden) Carolina Navarro	

=== Round of 16 ===
Men's

Date	Winners	Score	Opponent	Refs.
12/9/2024	(Argentina) Agustín Tapia (Spain) Arturo Coello	6–3 / 6–2	(Spain) Guillermo Collado (Spain) Javi Martinez Vazquez	
12/9/2024	(Spain) Alex Ruiz (Spain) Javi Garrido	6–3 / 6–4	(Argentina) Valentino Libaak (Spain) Victor Ruiz	
12/9/2024	(Spain) Coki Nieto (Spain) Jon Sanz	6–3 / 7–5	(Spain) Alejandro Arroyo (Argentina) Sanyo Gutiérrez	
12/9/2024	(Argentina) Alex Chozas (Argentina) Leandro Augsburger	1–6 / 7–6 / 6–4	(Spain) Juan Lebrón (Argentina) Martin Di Nenno	
12/9/2024	(Argentina) Franco Stupaczuk (Spain) Miguel Yanguas	5–7 / 6–1 / 6–2	(Argentina) Lucho Capra (Argentina) Maxi Sánchez	
12/9/2024	(Argentina) Fernando Belasteguín (Argentina) Juan Ignacio Tello	6–1 / 6–4	(Italy) Aris Patiniotis (Spain) Jesus Moya	
12/9/2024	(Spain) Pablo Cardona (Spain) Paquito Navarro	6–1 / 6–3	(Spain) Alvero Cepero (Spain) Miguel Benítez	
12/9/2024	(Spain) Alejandro Galán (Argentina) Federico Chingotto	6–2 / 6–2	(Spain) Eduardo Alonso (Spain) Momo Gonzalez	

Women's

Date	Winners	Score	Opponent	Refs.
12/9/2024	(Spain) Ariana Sánchez (Spain) Paula Josemaria	6–0 / 6–4	(Spain) Agueda Perez (Spain) Patricia Martínez	
12/9/2024	(Argentina) Aranzazu Osoro (Spain) Veronica Virseda	6–3 / 6–4	(Italy) Carolina Orsi (Spain) Nuria Rodriguez	
12/9/2024	(Spain) Lucia Sainz (Spain) Patricia Llaguno	7–5 / 6–3	(Spain) Beatriz Caldera (Spain) Lorena Rufo	
12/9/2024	(Spain) Alejandra Salazar (Spain) Jessica Castelló	6–2 / 6–3	(Argentina) Julieta Bidahorria (Spain) Marta Talavan	
12/9/2024	(Spain) Marta Ortega (Portugal) Sofia Araújo	6–2 / 6–3	(Italy) Giorgia Marchetti (France) Lea Godallier	
12/9/2024	(Spain) Marina Guinart (Spain) Victoria Iglesias	6–7 / 6–2 / 1–0 / W.O.	(Argentina) Claudia Jensen (Spain) Teresa Navarro	
12/9/2024	(Russia) Ksenia Sharifova (Spain) Lucía Martínez Gomez	6–3 / 6–2	(Spain) Julia Polo Bautista (Spain) Lara Arruabarrena	
12/9/2024	(Spain) Claudia Fernandez (Spain) Gemma Triay	6–1 / 6–3	(Spain) Andrea Ustero (Spain) Martina Calvo	

=== Quarter-Finals ===
Men's

Date	Winners	Score	Opponent	Refs.
13/9/2024	(Argentina) Agustín Tapia (Spain) Arturo Coello	6–3 / 6–1	(Spain) Alex Ruiz (Spain) Javi Garrido	
13/9/2024	(Argentina) Alex Chozas (Argentina) Leandro Augsburger	3–6 / 7–6 / 6–4	(Spain) Coki Nieto (Spain) Jon Sanz	
13/9/2024	(Argentina) Franco Stupaczuk (Spain) Miguel Yanguas	6–2 / 4–6 / 6–3	(Argentina) Fernando Belasteguín (Argentina) Juan Ignacio Tello	
13/9/2024	(Spain) Alejandro Galán (Argentina) Federico Chingotto	6–2 / 6–2	(Spain) Pablo Cardona (Spain) Paquito Navarro	

Women's

Date	Winners	Score	Opponent	Refs.
13/9/2024	(Spain) Ariana Sánchez (Spain) Paula Josemaria	6–2 / 6–1	(Argentina) Aranzazu Osoro (Spain) Veronica Virseda	
13/9/2024	(Spain) Lucia Sainz (Spain) Patricia Llaguno	6–4 / 6–3	(Spain) Alejandra Salazar (Spain) Jessica Castelló	
13/9/2024	(Spain) Marta Ortega (Portugal) Sofia Araújo	6–3 / 6–1	(Spain) Marina Guinart (Spain) Victoria Iglesias	
13/9/2024	(Spain) Claudia Fernandez (Spain) Gemma Triay	6–3 / 6–3	(Russia) Ksenia Sharifova (Spain) Lucía Martínez Gomez	

=== Semi-Finals ===
Men's

Date	Winners	Score	Opponent	Refs.
14/9/2024	(Argentina) Agustín Tapia (Spain) Arturo Coello	7–6 / 6–2	(Argentina) Alex Chozas (Argentina) Leandro Augsburger	
14/9/2024	(Spain) Alejandro Galán (Argentina) Federico Chingotto	7–5 / 6–3	(Argentina) Franco Stupaczuk (Spain) Miguel Yanguas	

Women's

Date	Winners	Score	Opponent	Refs.
14/9/2024	(Spain) Ariana Sánchez (Spain) Paula Josemaria	6–1 / 6–3	(Spain) Lucia Sainz (Spain) Patricia Llaguno	
14/9/2024	(Spain) Claudia Fernandez (Spain) Gemma Triay	6–4 / 6–3	(Spain) Marta Ortega (Portugal) Sofia Araújo	

=== Finals ===
Men's

Date	Winners	Score	Opponent	Refs.
15/9/2024	(Argentina) Agustín Tapia (Spain) Arturo Coello	6–2 / 6–2	(Spain) Alejandro Galán (Argentina) Federico Chingotto	

Women's

Date	Winners	Score	Opponent	Refs.
15/9/2024	(Spain) Ariana Sánchez (Spain) Paula Josemaria	6–4 / 6–4	(Spain) Claudia Fernandez (Spain) Gemma Triay	
