= 2024 NewGiza P2 =

Padel championships

- Date: 19 – 26 October
- Edition: 2nd
- Category: P2
- Prize money: €250.000
- Location: Giza, Egypt
- Venue: Newgiza Sports Club

Champions
- Men's doubles: (Argentina) Franco Stupaczuk (Spain) Miguel Yanguas
- Women's doubles: (Spain) Marta Ortega (Portugal) Sofia Araujo

Chronology

The 2024 NewGiza P2 (officially 2024 NewGiza Premier Padel P2) was the nineteenth tournament of the third season organized by Premier Padel, promoted by the International Padel Federation, and with the financial backing of Nasser Al-Khelaïfi's Qatar Sports Investments, now serving as the premier padel circuit.

In the women's category, the FIP's 4th and 5th ranked pairs faced off in the final, with both making their second finals appearance and seeking their second title of the season. The number four pair, Marta Ortega and Sofia Araujo, defeated Alejandra Salazar and Jessica Castelló to celebrate their second title of the season.

In the men's category, with the top three pairs in the FIP rankings absent, Franco Stupaczuk and Mike Yanguas seized the opportunity to reach the finals, where they defeated Javi Garrido and Lucas Bergamini to claim their first title of the year, and their first individual titles of the season.

== Relevant Data ==
=== Third tournament without the top-ranked pairs ===
The No. 1, 2, 3, and 5 ranked pairs opted not to compete in this edition. Notable withdrawals included Coello/Tapia, Di Nenno/Lebrón, Galán/Chingotto, and Cardona/Paquito, leaving Franco Stupaczuk and Mike Yanguas as the top seeds.

Just as in the men's category, the top seeds, Ariana Sánchez and Paula Josemaría, also opted to participate. The biggest surprise came with the partnership between Delfina Brea and former world number one Lucía Sainz, entering as the number two pair.

=== New winners ===
The victory by Stupaczuk and Yanguas marked the third time in 2024 that a pair not including Coello, Tapia, or Galán won a men's tournament. The top three ranked players did not compete in any of those three events, whereas in all other tournaments where they were present, they reached the finals, with the exception of the Seville P2.

=== Araújo and Ortega second ===
In the women's division, with the victory of Marta Ortega and Sofia Araujo, the Portuguese player won her second major professional padel tournament.

== Seeds ==
Male

Rnk.	Team	FIP Ranking Points
1	(Argentina) Franco Stupaczuk (Spain) Miguel Yanguas	12516
2	(Spain) Coki Nieto (Spain) Jon Sanz	7513
3	(Spain) Eduardo Alonso (Spain) Momo Gonzalez	6953
4	(Spain) Javi Garrido (Brazil) Lucas Bergamini	6928
5	(Spain) Alejandro Arroyo (Spain) Alejandro Ruiz	5402
6	(Argentina) Sanyo Gutiérrez (Spain) Victor Ruiz	4884
7	(Argentina) Fernando Belasteguín (Argentina) Valentino Libaak	4448
8	(Argentina) Lucho Capra (Argentina) Maxi Sanchéz	4117
9	(United Arab Emirates) Inigo Jofre (Argentina) Juan Tello	3842
10	(Spain) Javier Leal (Brazil) Lucas Campagnolo	3384
11	(Argentina) Alex Chozas (Argentina) Leandro Augsburguer	3330
12	(Spain) Francisco Guerrero (Spain) Jairo Bautista	2703
13	(Spain) Javier Ruiz (Spain) Jose Garcia Diestro	2637
14	(Spain) Gonzalo Rubio (Spain) Pablo Lijó	2635
15	(Spain) Javier Barahona (Spain) Teodoro Zapata	2532
16	(Argentina) Juan Cruz Belluati (Argentina) Ramiro Moyano	2182

Female

Rnk.	Team	FIP Ranking Points
1	(Spain) Claudia Fernandez (Spain) Gemma Triay	18944
2	(Argentina) Delfina Brea (Spain) Lucia Sainz	10648
3	(Spain) Marta Ortega (Portugal) Sofia Araújo	11465
4	(Spain) Alejandra Salazar (Spain) Jessica Castello	10196
5	(Argentina) Claudia Jensen (Spain) Tamara Icardo	7991
6	(Argentina) Aranzazu Osoro (Spain) Veronica Virseda	7773
7	(Spain) Alejandra Alonso (Spain) Andrea Ustero	6452
8	(Spain) Carmen Goenaga (Argentina) Virginia Riera	5678
9	(Spain) Beatriz Caldera (Spain) Lorena Rufo	3852
10	(Russia) Ksenia Sharifova (Spain) Lucia Martinez	3785
11	(Italy) Carolina Orsi (Spain) Nuria Rodriguez	3487
12	(Spain) Marina Guinart (Spain) Victoria Iglesias	3464
13	(France) Alix Collombon (Spain) Araceli Martinez	2703
14	(Argentina) Julieta Bidahorria (Spain) Marta Talavan	2517
15	(Spain) Jimena Velasco (Spain) Noa Canovas	2323
16	(Spain) Maria Rodriguez Abajo (Spain) Sandra Bellver	2108

== Head-to-head record between teams ranked in the top 4 during the season ==
=== Man's ===
Record	Coello–Tapia	Galán–Chingotto	Lebrón–Di Nenno	Stupaczuk–Yanguas	Former Pairs	Galán–Lebrón	Paquito–Sanyo	Lebrón–Paquito	Di Nenno–Stupaczuk
Coello–Tapia	—	8–5	2–0	1–0		1–1	2–0	4–0	1–0
Galán–Chingotto	5–8	—	1–0	1–0		—	—	1–0	7–0
Lebrón–Di Nenno	0–2	0–1	—	—		—	—	—	—
Stupaczuk–Yanguas	0–1	0–1	—	—		—	—	—	—
Former Pairs									
Galán–Lebrón	1–1	—	—	—		—	—	—	2–0
Paquito–Sanyo	0–2	—	—	—		—	—	—	—
Lebrón–Paquito	0–4	0–1	—	—		—	—	—	0–1
Di Nenno–Stupaczuk	0–1	0–7	—	—		0–2	—	1–0	—

=== Women's ===
Record	Ariana–Paula	Fernandez–Triay	Gonzalez–D. Brea	Araújo–Ortega	Former Pairs	Icardo–Salazar	Ortega–Triay	Ortega–Virseda
Ariana–Paula	—	5–5	2–1	2–1		1–0	—	1–0
Fernandez–Triay	5–5	—	2–3	1–0		0–1	—	1–0
B. Gonzalez–D. Brea	1–2	3–2	—	1–0		3–0	—	—
Araújo–Ortega	1–2	0–1	0–1	—		—	—	—
Former Pairs								
Icardo–Salazar	0–1	1–0	0–3	—		—	—	—
Ortega–Triay	—	—	—	—		—	—	—
Ortega–Virseda	0–1	0–1	—	—		—	—	—

Matchups involving Andrea Ustero and Delfina Brea, and subsequently Delfina Brea and Lucia Sainz, are not included, as these were merely temporary pairings that lasted for a total of three tournaments while Bea González was recovering from an injury.

== Draws ==
=== Men's Bracket ===
Round of 32
1	(Argentina) Stupaczuk / (Spain) Yanguas	6	6
25	(Italy) D. Perino / (Argentina) I. Piotto	1	3
Q	(Spain) M. Gonzalez / (France) T. Leygue	7	3	1
14	(Spain) G. Rubio / (Spain) P. Lijó	6	6	6
Q	(France) B. Blanque / (France) J. Bergeron	2	2
16	(Argentina) J.C. Belluati / (Argentina) R. Moyano	6	6
10	(Spain) J. Leal / (Brazil) L. Campagnolo	5	6	6
6	(Argentina) Sanyo / (Spain) V. Ruiz	7	4	2
5	(Spain) A. Ruiz / (Spain) A. Arroyo	6	6
WC	(Egypt) G. Wakim / (Egypt) Y. Hossam	3	3
19	(United Arab Emirates) A. Ayats / (Spain) E. Goenaga	6	6
26	(Spain) A. Van Beek / (Spain) L.H. Quesada	4	1
Q	(France) J. Seurin / (France) M. Moreau	5	6
15	(Spain) J. Barahona / (Spain) T. Zapata	7	7
Q	(Spain) A.F. Lancha / (Spain) M. Ortega	5	7	2
3	(Spain) E. Alonso / (Spain) Momo	7	6	6
4	(Spain) J. Garrido / (Brazil) L. Bergamini	6	6
9	(United Arab Emirates) I. Jofre / (Argentina) J. Tello	1	3
21	(Argentina) F. Mouriño / (Spain) M. Quilez	6	6
24	(Spain) Á. Amaya / (Argentina) C.G. Gutiérrez	3	1
12	(Spain) F. Guerrero / (Spain) J. Bautista	7	6
LL	(Spain) D. Sastre / (Argentina) M. Lamperti	6	3
11	(Argentina) A. Chozas / (Argentina) L. Augsburger	4	3
7	(Argentina) Belasteguín / (Argentina) V. Libaak	6	6
8	(Argentina) L. Capra / (Argentina) Maxi	6	5	6
23	(Italy) A. Patiniotis / (Chile) J. Valdes	3	7	3
22	(Spain) J.J. Casas / (Spain) P. Fernandez	6	6	6
18	(Spain) E.S. Chamero / (Spain) F. Gil	2	7	2
13	(Spain) J. Ruiz / (Spain) J.G. Diestro	6	6
WC	(Qatar) K. Alkuwari / (Qatar) M. Alkuwari	1	2
17	(Spain) A. Cepero / (Spain) M. Benitez	4	0
2	(Spain) Coki / (Spain) J. Sanz	6	6

Round of 16
1	(Argentina) Stupaczuk / (Spain) Yanguas	6	6
14	(Spain) G. Rubio / (Spain) P. Lijó	2	1
16	(Argentina) J.C. Belluati / (Argentina) R. Moyano	3	4
10	(Spain) J. Leal / (Brazil) L. Campagnolo	6	6
5	(Spain) A. Ruiz / (Spain) A. Arroyo	6	6
19	(United Arab Emirates) A. Ayats / (Spain) E. Goenaga	2	3
15	(Spain) J. Barahona / (Spain) T. Zapata	5	7	2
3	(Spain) E. Alonso / (Spain) Momo	7	6	6
4	(Spain) J. Garrido / (Brazil) L. Bergamini	6	6
21	(Argentina) F. Mouriño / (Spain) M. Quilez	1	4
12	(Spain) F. Guerrero / (Spain) J. Bautista	1	7	2
7	(Argentina) Belasteguín / (Argentina) V. Libaak	6	6	6
8	(Argentina) L. Capra / (Argentina) Maxi	6	7
22	(Spain) J.J. Casas / (Spain) P. Fernandez	3	6
13	(Spain) J. Ruiz / (Spain) J.G. Diestro	2	6	4
2	(Spain) Coki / (Spain) J. Sanz	6	4	6

Quarter-Final
1	(Argentina) Stupaczuk / (Spain) Yanguas	6	6
10	(Spain) J. Leal / (Brazil) L. Campagnolo	2	3
5	(Spain) A. Ruiz / (Spain) A. Arroyo	7	6	2
3	(Spain) E. Alonso / (Spain) Momo	5	7	6
4	(Spain) J. Garrido / (Brazil) L. Bergamini	6	6
7	(Argentina) Belasteguín / (Argentina) V. Libaak	2	1
8	(Argentina) L. Capra / (Argentina) Maxi	4	2
2	(Spain) Coki / (Spain) J. Sanz	6	6

Semi-Finals
1	(Argentina) Stupaczuk / (Spain) Yanguas	6	6
3	(Spain) E. Alonso / (Spain) Momo	2	2
4	(Spain) J. Garrido / (Brazil) L. Bergamini	4	6	6
2	(Spain) Coki / (Spain) J. Sanz	6	2	1

Finals
1	(Argentina) Stupaczuk / (Spain) Yanguas	6	7
4	(Spain) J. Garrido / (Brazil) L. Bergamini	3	6

=== Women's Bracket ===
Round of 32
1	(Spain) C. Fernandez / (Spain) G. Triay
Bye
WC	(Egypt) L. El Nimr / (Egypt) M. Hakim	1	0
Q	(Spain) M. Santamaria / (Spain) S. Pujals	6	6
19	(Italy) G. Marchetti / (France) L. Godallier	6	4
18	(Spain) M. Lobo / (Spain) S. Saiz	7	6
LL	(Spain) L. Alonso / (Spain) M. Portillo	4	0
7	(Spain) A. Alonso / (Spain) A. Ustero	6	6
5	(Argentina) C. Jensen / (Spain) T. Icardo	6	6
23	(Spain) B. Las Heras / (Italy) C. Casali	3	2
Q	(Spain) A. Soriano / (Spain) L. Manquillo	6	2
17	(Spain) A. Perez / (Spain) P. Martinez	7	6
22	(Spain) J. Bautista / (Spain) L. Arruabarrena	6	4	4
Q	(Sweden) C. Navarro / (Spain) J. Cabruja	3	6	6
Bye
4	(Spain) A. Salazar / (Spain) J. Castello
3	(Spain) M. Ortega / (Portugal) S. Araújo
Bye
LL	(Spain) A. Pozuelo / (Spain) A. Dominguez	5	2
20	(Spain) N. Aguilar / (Spain) T. Navarro	7	6
LL	(Spain) A. Cañellas / (Spain) A. Cañellas	1	4
11	(Italy) C. Orsi / (Spain) N. Rodriguez	6	6
14	(Argentina) J. Bidahorria / (Spain) M. Talavan	6	7
8	(Spain) C. Goenaga / (Argentina) V. Riera	4	5
6	(Argentina) A. Osoro / (Spain) V. Virseda	6	6
9	(Spain) B. Caldera / (Spain) L. Rufo	3	3
12	(Spain) M. Guinart / (Spain) V. Iglesias	7	6
16	(Spain) M.R. Abajo / (Spain) S. Bellver	5	3
Q	(Brazil) M. Schuck / (Spain) M. Rivas	4	3
15	(Spain) J. Velasco / (Spain) N. Canovas	6	6
Bye
2	(Argentina) D. Brea / (Spain) L. Sainz

Round of 16
1	(Spain) C. Fernandez / (Spain) G. Triay	6	6
Q	(Spain) M. Santamaria / (Spain) S. Pujals	0	3
18	(Spain) M. Lobo / (Spain) S. Saiz	6	4	4
7	(Spain) A. Alonso / (Spain) A. Ustero	2	6	6
5	(Argentina) C. Jensen / (Spain) T. Icardo	1	6	6
17	(Spain) A. Perez / (Spain) P. Martinez	6	3	1
Q	(Sweden) C. Navarro / (Spain) J. Cabruja	6	1
4	(Spain) A. Salazar / (Spain) J. Castello	7	6
3	(Spain) M. Ortega / (Portugal) S. Araújo	6	6
20	(Spain) N. Aguilar / (Spain) T. Navarro	4	0
11	(Italy) C. Orsi / (Spain) N. Rodriguez	6	4	6
14	(Argentina) J. Bidahorria / (Spain) M. Talavan	2	6	4
6	(Argentina) A. Osoro / (Spain) V. Virseda	6	6
12	(Spain) M. Guinart / (Spain) V. Iglesias	2	3
15	(Spain) J. Velasco / (Spain) N. Canovas	3	0
2	(Argentina) D. Brea / (Spain) L. Sainz	6	6

Quarter-Final
1	(Spain) C. Fernandez / (Spain) G. Triay	6	6
7	(Spain) A. Alonso / (Spain) A. Ustero	0	2
5	(Argentina) C. Jensen / (Spain) T. Icardo	6	3	2
4	(Spain) A. Salazar / (Spain) J. Castello	4	6	6
3	(Spain) M. Ortega / (Portugal) S. Araújo	4	6	6
11	(Italy) C. Orsi / (Spain) N. Rodriguez	6	2	2
6	(Argentina) A. Osoro / (Spain) V. Virseda	4	6	6
2	(Argentina) D. Brea / (Spain) L. Sainz	6	3	4

Semi-Finals
1	(Spain) C. Fernandez / (Spain) G. Triay	4	3
4	(Spain) A. Salazar / (Spain) J. Castello	6	6
3	(Spain) M. Ortega / (Portugal) S. Araújo	6	6	6
6	(Argentina) A. Osoro / (Spain) V. Virseda	7	2	1

Finals
4	(Spain) A. Salazar / (Spain) J. Castello	4	2
3	(Spain) M. Ortega / (Portugal) S. Araújo	6	6

== Results ==
=== Round of 32 ===
Men's

Date	Winners	Score	Opponent	Refs.
22/10/2024	(Argentina) Franco Stupaczuk (Spain) Miguel Yanguas	6–1 / 6–3	(Italy) Denis Perino (Argentina) Ignacio Piotto	
22/10/2024	(Spain) Gonzalo Rubio (Spain) Pablo Lijó	6–7 / 6–3 / 6–1	(Spain) Miguel Gonzalez (France) Thomas Leygue	
22/10/2024	(Argentina) Juan Cruz Belluati (Argentina) Ramiro Moyano	6–2 / 6–2	(France) Bastien Blanque (France) Johan Bergeron	
22/10/2024	(Spain) Javier Leal (Brazil) Lucas Campagnolo	5–7 / 6–4 / 6–2	(Argentina) Sanyo Gutiérrez (Spain) Victor Ruiz	
22/10/2024	(Spain) Alex Arroyo (Spain) Aléx Ruiz	6–3 / 6–3	(Egypt) Georges Wakim (Egypt) Youssef Hossam	
21/10/2024	(United Arab Emirates) Arnau Ayats (Spain) Enrique Goenaga	6–4 / 6–1	(Spain) Alejandro Tasa Van Beek (Spain) Luis Hernandez Quesada	
22/10/2024	(Spain) Javier Gonzalez Barahona (Spain) Teodoro Zapata	7–5 / 7–6	(France) Julien Seurin (France) Maxime Moreau	
22/10/2024	(Spain) Eduardo Alonso (Spain) Momo Gonzalez	7–5 / 6–7 / 6–2	(Spain) Andres Fernandez Lancha (Spain) Mario Ortega	
22/10/2024	(Spain) Javi Garrido (Brazil) Lucas Bergamini	6–1 / 6–3	(United Arab Emirates) Iñigo Jofre (Argentina) Juan Tello	
21/10/2024	(Argentina) Federico Mouriño (Spain) Javier García Mora	6–3 / 6–1	(Spain) Álvaro Melendez Amaya (Argentina) Cristian German Gutiérrez	
22/10/2024	(Spain) Francisco Guerrero (Spain) Jairo Bautista	7–6 / 6–3	(Spain) Daniel Santigosa (Argentina) Miguel Lamperti	
22/10/2024	(Argentina) Fernando Belasteguín (Argentina) Valentino Libaak	6–4 / 6–3	(Argentina) Alex Chozas (Argentina) Leandro Augsburger	
22/10/2024	(Argentina) Lucho Capra (Argentina) Maxi Sánchez	6–3 / 5–7 / 6–3	(Italy) Aris Patiniotis (Spain) Jesus Moya	
21/10/2024	(Spain) José Jimenez Casas (Spain) Pincho Fernandez	6–2 / 6–7 / 6–2	(Spain) Emilio Sanchez Chamero (Spain) Francisco Gil Morales	
21/10/2024	(Spain) Javier Ruiz (Spain) Jose García Diestro	6–1 / 6–2	(Qatar) Khalid Saadon Alkuwari (Qatar) Mohammed Saadon Alkuwari	
22/10/2024	(Spain) Coki Nieto (Spain) Jon Sanz	6–4 / 6–0	(Spain) Alvero Cepero (Spain) Miguel Benítez	

Women's

Date	Winners	Score	Opponent	Refs.
22/10/2024	(Spain) Martina Calvo (Spain) Sara Pujals	6–1 / 6–0	(Egypt) Laila El Nimr (Egypt) Mora Hakim	
22/10/2024	(Spain) Marina Martinez Lobo (Spain) Sofía Saiz Vallejo	7–6 / 6–4	(Italy) Giorgia Marchetti (France) Lea Godallier	
22/10/2024	(Spain) Alejandra Alonso (Spain) Andrea Ustero	6–4 / 6–0	(Spain) Lorena Alonso (Spain) María Portillo	
22/10/2024	(Argentina) Claudia Jensen (Spain) Tamara Icardo	6–3 / 6–2	(Spain) Barbara Las Heras (Italy) Carlotta Casali	
22/10/2024	(Spain) Agueda Perez (Spain) Patricia Martínez	7–6 / 6–2	(Spain) Arantxa Soriano (Spain) Letizia Manquillo	
22/10/2024	(Sweden) Carolina Navarro (Spain) Jana Montes Cabruja	3–6 / 6–4 / 6–4	(Spain) Julia Polo Bautista (Spain) Lara Arruabarrena	
22/10/2024	(Spain) Noemi Aguilar (Spain) Teresa Navarro	7–5 / 6–2	(Spain) Ana Dominguez Gracia (Spain) Ainara Pozuelo	
22/10/2024	(Italy) Carolina Orsi (Spain) Nuria Rodriguez	6–1 / 6–4	(Spain) Alicia Cañellas (Spain) Ariadna Cañellas	
22/10/2024	(Argentina) Julieta Bidahorria (Spain) Marta Talavan	6–4 / 7–5	(Spain) Carmen Goenaga (Argentina) Virginia Riera	
22/10/2024	(Argentina) Aranzazu Osoro (Spain) Veronica Virseda	6–3 / 6–3	(Spain) Beatriz Caldera (Spain) Lorena Rufo	
22/10/2024	(Spain) Marina Guinart (Spain) Victoria Iglesias	7–5 / 6–3	(Spain) Laia Rodriguez Abajo (Spain) Sandra Bellver	
22/10/2024	(Spain) Jimena Velasco (Spain) Noa Canovas	6–4 / 6–3	(Brazil) Manuela Schuck (Spain) Mónica Gomez Rivas	

=== Round of 16 ===
Men's

Date	Winners	Score	Opponent	Refs.
23/10/2024	(Argentina) Franco Stupaczuk (Spain) Miguel Yanguas	6–2 / 6–1	(Spain) Gonzalo Rubio (Spain) Pablo Lijó	
23/10/2024	(Spain) Javier Leal (Brazil) Lucas Campagnolo	6–3 / 6–4	(Argentina) Juan Cruz Belluati (Argentina) Ramiro Moyano	
23/10/2024	(Spain) Alex Arroyo (Spain) Aléx Ruiz	6–2 / 6–3	(United Arab Emirates) Arnau Ayats (Spain) Enrique Goenaga	
23/10/2024	(Spain) Eduardo Alonso (Spain) Momo Gonzalez	7–5 / 6–7 / 6–2	(Spain) Javier Gonzalez Barahona (Spain) Teodoro Zapata	
23/10/2024	(Spain) Javi Garrido (Brazil) Lucas Bergamini	6–1 / 6–4	(Argentina) Federico Mouriño (Spain) Javier García Mora	
23/10/2024	(Argentina) Fernando Belasteguín (Argentina) Valentino Libaak	6–1 / 6–7 / 6–2	(Spain) Francisco Guerrero (Spain) Jairo Bautista	
23/10/2024	(Argentina) Lucho Capra (Argentina) Maxi Sánchez	6–3 / 7–6	(Spain) José Jimenez Casas (Spain) Pincho Fernandez	
23/10/2024	(Spain) Coki Nieto (Spain) Jon Sanz	6–2 / 4–6 / 6–4	(Spain) Javier Ruiz (Spain) Jose García Diestro	

Women's

Date	Winners	Score	Opponent	Refs.
23/10/2024	(Spain) Claudia Fernandéz; Gemma Triay	6–0 / 6–3	(Spain) Martina Calvo (Spain) Sara Pujals	
23/10/2024	(Spain) Alejandra Alonso (Spain) Andrea Ustero	2–6 / 6–4 / 6–4	(Spain) Marina Martinez Lobo (Spain) Sofía Saiz Vallejo	
23/10/2024	(Argentina) Claudia Jensen (Spain) Tamara Icardo	1–6 / 6–3 / 6–1	(Spain) Agueda Perez (Spain) Patricia Martínez	
23/10/2024	(Spain) Alejandra Salazar (Spain) Jessica Castelló	7–6 / 6–1	(Sweden) Carolina Navarro (Spain) Jana Montes Cabruja	
23/10/2024	(Spain) Marta Ortega (Portugal) Sofia Araújo	6–4 / 6–0	(Spain) Noemi Aguilar (Spain) Teresa Navarro	
23/10/2024	(Italy) Carolina Orsi (Spain) Nuria Rodriguez	6–2 / 4–6 / 6–4	(Argentina) Julieta Bidahorria (Spain) Marta Talavan	
23/10/2024	(Argentina) Aranzazu Osoro (Spain) Veronica Virseda	6–2 / 6–3	(Spain) Marina Guinart (Spain) Victoria Iglesias	
23/10/2024	(Argentina) Delfina Brea (Spain) Lucía Sainz	6–3 / 6–0	(Spain) Jimena Velasco (Spain) Noa Canovas	

=== Quarter-Finals ===
Men's

Date	Winners	Score	Opponent	Refs.
24/10/2024	(Argentina) Franco Stupaczuk (Spain) Miguel Yanguas	6–2 / 6–3	(Spain) Javier Leal (Brazil) Lucas Campagnolo	
24/10/2024	(Spain) Eduardo Alonso (Spain) Momo Gonzalez	5–7 / 7–6 / 6–2	(Spain) Alex Arroyo (Spain) Aléx Ruiz	
24/10/2024	(Spain) Javi Garrido (Brazil) Lucas Bergamini	6–2 / 6–1	(Argentina) Fernando Belasteguín (Argentina) Valentino Libaak	
24/10/2024	(Spain) Coki Nieto (Spain) Jon Sanz	6–4 / 6–2	(Argentina) Lucho Capra (Argentina) Maxi Sánchez	

Women's

Date	Winners	Score	Opponent	Refs.
24/10/2024	(Spain) Claudia Fernandéz; Gemma Triay	6–0 / 6–2	(Spain) Alejandra Alonso (Spain) Andrea Ustero	
24/10/2024	(Spain) Alejandra Salazar (Spain) Jessica Castelló	4–6 / 6–3 / 6–2	(Argentina) Claudia Jensen (Spain) Tamara Icardo	
24/10/2024	(Spain) Marta Ortega (Portugal) Sofia Araújo	4–6 / 6–2 / 6–2	(Italy) Carolina Orsi (Spain) Nuria Rodriguez	
24/10/2024	(Argentina) Aranzazu Osoro (Spain) Veronica Virseda	4–6 / 6–3 / 6–4	(Argentina) Delfina Brea (Spain) Lucía Sainz	

=== Semi-Finals ===
Men's

Date	Winners	Score	Opponent	Refs.
25/10/2024	(Argentina) Franco Stupaczuk (Spain) Miguel Yanguas	6–2 / 6–2	(Spain) Eduardo Alonso (Spain) Momo Gonzalez	
25/10/2024	(Spain) Javi Garrido (Brazil) Lucas Bergamini	4–6 / 6–2 / 6–1	(Spain) Coki Nieto (Spain) Jon Sanz	

Women's

Date	Winners	Score	Opponent	Refs.
25/10/2024	(Spain) Alejandra Salazar (Spain) Jessica Castelló	6–4 / 6–3	(Spain) Claudia Fernandéz; Gemma Triay	
25/10/2024	(Spain) Marta Ortega (Portugal) Sofia Araújo	6–7 / 6–2 / 6–1	(Argentina) Aranzazu Osoro (Spain) Veronica Virseda	

=== Finals ===
Men's

Date	Winners	Score	Opponent	Refs.
26/10/2024	(Argentina) Franco Stupaczuk (Spain) Miguel Yanguas	6–3 / 7–6	(Spain) Javi Garrido (Brazil) Lucas Bergamini	

Women's

Date	Winners	Score	Opponent	Refs.
26/10/2024	(Spain) Marta Ortega (Portugal) Sofia Araújo	6–4 / 6–2	(Spain) Alejandra Salazar (Spain) Jessica Castelló	
