= 2025 Cancún P2 =

Padel championships

- Date: 9 – 16 March
- Edition: 1st
- Category: P2
- Prize money: €252.250
- Location: Cancún, Mexico
- Venue: Rafa Nadal Academy

Champions
- Men's doubles: (Argentina) Franco Stupaczuk (Spain) Juan Lebrón
- Women's doubles: (Argentina) Delfina Brea (Spain) Gemma Triay

Chronology

The 2025 Cancún P2 (officially 2025 Premier Padel Cancún P2) was the third tournament of the fourth season organized by Premier Padel, the premier padel circuit, promoted by the International Padel Federation, and with the financial backing of Nasser Al-Khelaïfi's Qatar Sports Investments.

In the women's category, Delfina Brea and Gemma Triay continued their strong form from the previous tournament by reaching the finals to face the International Padel Federation (FIP) world number 4 pair, Marta Ortega and Sofia Araujo. With a straight-sets victory, the number two seeds claimed their second title of the year.

In the men's category, Franco Stupaczuk and Juan Lebrón, the only players from the FIP top 100 in the tournament, defeated the Argentine pair of Gonzalo Alfonso and Leonel Aguirre to claim their first title of 2024.

== Relevant Data ==
Despite registering for the Miami P1, the players boycott of Premier Padel tournaments continued in Cancún. Only Franco Stupaczuk and Juan Lebrón registered following the extension of the entry deadline for the Cancún P2, becoming the only top-100 players to do so.

Franco Stupaczuk later released a statement on his social media, sharing his perspective on the current state of the sport following the boycott of the Gijón P2 tournament by the Premier Padel circuit's top players:

"Hello everyone! Let me speak to you from the inside, with complete sincerity. The situation padel is facing right now is deeply painful and worrying. We were all saddened not to be present in Gijón; nevertheless, I must congratulate the fans for filling the stands and supporting the sport, as I saw via the live stream.

"I realize not everyone is familiar with what is happening, so I would like to outline two recent developments. A few weeks ago, many of us players made the unfortunate decision, a point we never wanted to reach, not to register for the Gijón tournament. This was a measure intended to secure changes to sporting regulations introduced for 2024, changes we consider vital for the future of our sport. Following those events, we faced the dilemma of whether or not to register for the next tournament, scheduled for Cancún next week. I assure you that we players want to compete in every tournament; this is a very delicate situation.

Personally, I won’t deny that I’ve had plenty of doubts about what the right decision was. I greatly value the fact that we have the PPA, our players' association, which fights day in and day out for the athletes' well-being and is fundamental to the progress of our professional careers. At the same time, however, I also want to acknowledge the efforts of Premier Padel, the FIP, the sponsors, and the tournament promoters, as they play a vital role in the continued international growth of this sport.

After everything that transpired, I decided not to participate in Gijón (I don’t know if I was wrong), and now I have decided to sign up for the Cancún tournament because I trust that this situation can be resolved through dialogue. Whether it is a mistake or not, I do not know, but it is a carefully considered decision in which I took all factors into account.

The reality is that we do not know all the nuances of our contractual situation. For this reason, I decided to consult a law firm to analyze the situation. They sent me an extensive document strongly advising against not signing up for upcoming tournaments due to the legal, civil, commercial, and sporting risks such a decision could entail, as well as the resulting economic and financial consequences. I shared this recommendation with the other players so they would have all the information and could make the decision they deemed most appropriate.

Furthermore, the FIP and Premier Padel offered, via a signed letter, to sit down and negotiate with us to try to reach an agreement. I believe this is an important step, and I value it highly. I have the utmost respect for all the players who decided not to register for the Cancún tournament. However, I also ask that both my decision and Juan’s decision to participate in that tournament be respected.

We assure you that we have no intention whatsoever of gaining a sporting advantage from this matter. In fact, if it is decided in the future that Cancún will not count towards the rankings, we will agree to that. Or if, down the line, we need to skip a P2 event so that our fellow players can earn the points they missed out on in Mexico, we will do so. This isn’t about points or prize money; it is a decision rooted in something much deeper.

Spectators, promoters, players, organizations: please, we are a YOUNG sport, with great potential, yes, but we must keep building it and continue striving to find a path of coexistence that helps padel eventually become a universal and Olympic sport. Let’s solve this TOGETHER. Stupa."

Meanwhile, despite all the top players registering for the next two events, the Miami P1 and Santiago P1, as they are contractually obligated to compete in them, the Professional Padel Players Association (PPA) called a press conference to publicly air the grievances that led them to sit out the Gijón and Cancún P2 tournaments. Prior to the press conference, Premier Padel had sent a letter agreeing to revert to traditional entry formats starting with the Santiago P1, this change, which accommodates a larger number of pairs, was one of the PPA's main demands.

Led by Álex Ruiz (president), Martín di Nenno (vice-president), García Diestro (secretary), and Fede Chingotto (board member), called for legal certainty and demanded that the FIP, which they view as the mediator between the interests of Premier Padel and the PPA, to remain neutral "and not be conflated with Premier Padel." They also stated that they are not contractually required to play in P2 events and reject the "boycott" label applied to them by Premier Padel, which insists that participation in P2 tournaments is mandatory. Due to the extension of the tournament registration period, players also requested that the tournament be excluded from the rankings.

== Seeds ==
Male

Rnk.	Team	FIP Ranking Points
1	(Argentina) Franco Stupaczuk (Spain) Juan Lebrón	16435
2	(Spain) Diego García (Spain) Francisco Cabeza	1539
3	(Argentina) Gonzalo Alfonso (Argentina) Leonel Aguirre	1510
4	(Portugal) Gustavo Nunes (Spain) Miguel Solbes	1206
5	(Spain) Jaume Barcelo (Italy) Simone Cremona	1094
6	(Sweden) Adam Axelsson (Sweden) Simon Vasquez	1007
7	(Spain) Alberto Jimenez (United Kingdom) Christian Murphy	811
8	(Spain) Alejandro Carnero (Belgium) Clement Geens	794
9	(Spain) Andres Fernandez Lancha (Spain) Rodrigo Coello	787
10	(Spain) Manuel Castaño (Italy) Nicolas Suescun	721
11	(Spain) Boris Castro Garcia (Italy) Enzo Jensen	649
12	(Argentina) Julian Lacamoire (Egypt) Youssef Hossam	582
13	(Argentina) Juan Argañaras (Argentina) Oscar Almada	497
14	(Spain) Marc Villalonga (Spain) Nacho Moltò	454
15	(Netherlands) Bram Meijer (Netherlands) Sten Richters	451
16	(Spain) Roberto Pastor (Spain) Victor Checa	445

Female

Rnk.	Team	FIP Ranking Points
1	(Spain) Ariana Sánchez (Spain) Paula Josemaria	33020
2	(Argentina) Delfina Brea (Spain) Gemma Triay	24260
3	(Spain) Marta Ortega (Portugal) Sofia Araújo	14270
4	(Spain) Lucia Sainz (Spain) Patricia Llaguno	10960
5	(Spain) Alejandra Salazar (Spain) Veronica Virseda	10195
6	(Spain) Alejandra Alonso (Spain) Andrea Ustero	9920
7	(Argentina) Aranzazu Osoro (Spain) Jessica Castello	9485
8	(Argentina) Claudia Jensen (Spain) Tamara Icardo	9380
9	(Spain) Marta Marrero (Argentina) Virginia Riera	5374
10	(Italy) Carolina Orsi (Spain) Nuria Rodriguez	3841
11	(France) Alix Collombon (Spain) Araceli Martinez	3710
12	(Russia) Ksenia Sharifova (Spain) Marta Talavan	3488
13	(Spain) Lara Arruabarrena (Spain) Lorena Rufo	3354
14	(Italy) Giorgia Marchetti (Spain) Sara Ruiz	3009
15	(Spain) Jimena Velasco (Spain) Noa Canovas	2882
16	(Portugal) Ana Catarina Nogueira (Argentina) Martina Fassio	2471

== Head-to-head record between teams ranked in the top 4 during the season ==
=== Man's ===
Record	Coello–Tapia	Galán–Chingotto	Lebrón–Stupaczuk	Coki–Yanguas
Coello–Tapia	—	—	1–0	1–0
Galán–Chingotto	—	—	—	—
Lebrón–Stupaczuk	0–1	—	—	—
Coki–Yanguas	0–1	—	—	—

=== Women's ===
Record	Ariana–Paula	D. Brea–Triay	Gonzalez–Fernandez	Araújo–Ortega
Ariana–Paula	—	0–1	1–0	1–1
D. Brea–Triay	1–0	—	0–1	2–0
Gonzalez–Fernandez	0–1	1–0	—	—
Araújo–Ortega	1–1	0–2	—	—

== Draws ==
=== Men's Bracket ===
Round of 32
1	(Spain) Lebrón / (Argentina) Stupaczuk
Bye
16	(Spain) R. Pastor / (Spain) V. Checa	4	3
LL	(Argentina) A. Guevara / (Argentina) M. Gayone	6	6
13	(Argentina) J. Argañaras / (Argentina) O. Almada	3	4
12	(Argentina) J. Lacamoire / (Egypt) Y. Hossam	6	6
17	(France) J. Seurin / (France) P. Raichman	6	2
8	(Spain) A. Carnero / (Belgium) C. Geens	7	6
7	(Spain) A. Jimenez / (United Kingdom) C. Murphy	1	6	6
Q	(Chile) C. Martinez / (Argentina) P. Tofanelli	6	3	3
15	(Netherlands) B. Meijer / (Netherlands) S. Richters	5	2
Q	(Paraguay) F. Dehnike / (Spain) M. Herrera	7	6
14	(Spain) M. Villalonga / (Spain) N. Moltò	6	6
WC	(Mexico) J. Castillo / (Mexico) L. Garcia	4	2
Bye
4	(Portugal) G. Nunes / (Spain) M. Solbes
3	(Argentina) G. Alfonso / (Argentina) L. Aguirre
Bye
11	(Spain) B. Garcia / (Italy) E. Jensen	3	4
10	(Spain) M. Salguero / (Italy) N. Suescun	6	6
21	(Spain) A. Martinez / (Spain) C. Fuster	6	1	6
18	(Italy) E. Iriart / (Italy) M. Salandro	3	6	7
20	(Spain) J. Palos / (Italy) T.Gamondi	1	6
5	(Spain) J. Barcelo / (Italy) S. Cremona	6	7
6	(Sweden) A. Axelsson / (Sweden) S. Vasquez	6	6
Q	(Spain) P. Ortinez / (Netherlands) T. Roper	0	4
19	(Spain) J.F. Delgado / (Italy) P. Farabbi	3	4
WC	(Mexico) D. Garcia / (Mexico) J. Padilla	6	6
Q	(Spain) A. Ramos / (Spain) P. Ambel	4	3
9	(Spain) A.F. Lancha / (Spain) R. Coello	6	6
Bye
2	(Spain) F. Cabeza / (Spain) D. Garcia

Round of 16
1	(Spain) Lebrón / (Argentina) Stupaczuk	6	6
LL	(Argentina) A. Guevara / (Argentina) M. Gayone	0	1
12	(Argentina) J. Lacamoire / (Egypt) Y. Hossam	3	2
8	(Spain) A. Carnero / (Belgium) C. Geens	6	6
7	(Spain) A. Jimenez / (United Kingdom) C. Murphy	6	6
Q	(Paraguay) F. Dehnike / (Spain) M. Herrera	4	3
14	(Spain) M. Villalonga / (Spain) N. Moltò	6	7
4	(Portugal) G. Nunes / (Spain) M. Solbes	4	6
3	(Argentina) G. Alfonso / (Argentina) L. Aguirre	7	6	6
10	(Spain) M. Salguero / (Italy) N. Suescun	5	7	3
18	(Italy) E. Iriart / (Italy) M. Salandro	5	7	4
5	(Spain) J. Barcelo / (Italy) S. Cremona	7	6	6
6	(Sweden) A. Axelsson / (Sweden) S. Vasquez	6	6
WC	(Mexico) D. Garcia / (Mexico) J. Padilla	2	3
9	(Spain) A.F. Lancha / (Spain) R. Coello	6	4	1
2	(Spain) F. Cabeza / (Spain) D. Garcia	4	6	6

Quarter-Final
1	(Spain) Lebrón / (Argentina) Stupaczuk	6	6
8	(Spain) A. Carnero / (Belgium) C. Geens	2	4
7	(Spain) A. Jimenez / (United Kingdom) C. Murphy	6	2	3
14	(Spain) M. Villalonga / (Spain) N. Moltò	4	6	6
3	(Argentina) G. Alfonso / (Argentina) L. Aguirre	7	6
5	(Spain) J. Barcelo / (Italy) S. Cremona	6	2
6	(Sweden) A. Axelsson / (Sweden) S. Vasquez	7	6
2	(Spain) F. Cabeza / (Spain) D. Garcia	6	3

Semi-Finals
1	(Spain) Lebrón / (Argentina) Stupaczuk	6	6
14	(Spain) M. Villalonga / (Spain) N. Moltò	1	2
3	(Argentina) G. Alfonso / (Argentina) L. Aguirre	6	6
6	(Sweden) A. Axelsson / (Sweden) S. Vasquez	1	4

Finals
1	(Spain) Lebrón / (Argentina) Stupaczuk	6	6
3	(Argentina) G. Alfonso / (Argentina) L. Aguirre	2	3

=== Women's Bracket ===
Round of 32
1	(Spain) A. Sánchez / (Spain) P. Josemaria
Bye
15	(Spain) J. Velasco / (Spain) N. Canovas	6	4	6
Q	(Spain) L. Rodriguez / (Spain) M. Navarro	1	6	4
19	(Spain) A. Perez / (Spain) M. Merino	4	2
12	(Russia) K. Sharifova / (Spain) M. Talavan	6	6
Bye
5	(Spain) A. Salazar / (Spain) V. Virseda
8	(Argentina) C. Jensen / (Spain) T. Icardo
Bye
Q	(Spain) A. Cañellas / (Spain) L. Exposito	6	3	7
14	(Italy) G. Marchetti / (Spain) S. Ruiz	1	6	5
13	(Spain) L. Arruabarrena / (Spain) L. Rufo	3	6	2
10	(Italy) C. Orsi / (Spain) N. Rodriguez	6	4	6
Bye
3	(Spain) M. Ortega / (Portugal) S. Araújo
4	(Spain) L. Sainz / (Spain) P. Llaguno
Bye
17	(Spain) M. Lobo / (Spain) S. Saiz	7	6
18	(Spain) N. Aguilar / (Spain) T. Navarro	6	2
Q	(Spain) A. Soriano / (Sweden) C. Navarro	6	7	2
16	(Portugal) A. Nogueira / (Argentina) M. Goyeneche	7	6	6
Bye
7	(Argentina) A. Osoro / (Spain) J. Castelló
6	(Spain) A. Alonso / (Spain) A. Ustero
Bye
Q	(Spain) J. Cabruja / (Spain) J. Bautista	1	4
11	(France) A. Collombon / (Spain) A. Martinez	6	6
9	(Spain) M. Marrero / (Argentina) V. Riera	6	6
WC	(Mexico) C. Coellar / (Mexico) L. De La Peña	0	0
Bye
2	(Argentina) D. Brea / (Spain) G. Triay

Round of 16
1	(Spain) A. Sánchez / (Spain) P. Josemaria	6	6
15	(Spain) J. Velasco / (Spain) N. Canovas	4	0
12	(Russia) K. Sharifova / (Spain) M. Talavan	6	1	2
5	(Spain) A. Salazar / (Spain) V. Virseda	3	6	6
8	(Argentina) C. Jensen / (Spain) T. Icardo	6	6
Q	(Spain) A. Cañellas / (Spain) L. Exposito	2	1
10	(Italy) C. Orsi / (Spain) N. Rodriguez	4	4
3	(Spain) M. Ortega / (Portugal) S. Araújo	6	6
4	(Spain) L. Sainz / (Spain) P. Llaguno	6	6
17	(Spain) M. Lobo / (Spain) S. Saiz	1	0
16	(Portugal) A. Nogueira / (Argentina) M. Goyeneche	5	3
7	(Argentina) A. Osoro / (Spain) J. Castelló	7	6
6	(Spain) A. Alonso / (Spain) A. Ustero	3	7	6
11	(France) A. Collombon / (Spain) A. Martinez	6	6	2
9	(Spain) M. Marrero / (Argentina) V. Riera	4	1
2	(Argentina) D. Brea / (Spain) G. Triay	6	6

Quarter-Final
1	(Spain) A. Sánchez / (Spain) P. Josemaria	6	7
5	(Spain) A. Salazar / (Spain) V. Virseda	3	6
8	(Argentina) C. Jensen / (Spain) T. Icardo	1	3
3	(Spain) M. Ortega / (Portugal) S. Araújo	6	6
4	(Spain) L. Sainz / (Spain) P. Llaguno	6	1	2
7	(Argentina) A. Osoro / (Spain) J. Castelló	4	6	6
6	(Spain) A. Alonso / (Spain) A. Ustero	2	1
2	(Argentina) D. Brea / (Spain) G. Triay	6	6

Semi-Finals
1	(Spain) A. Sánchez / (Spain) P. Josemaria	2	6	4
3	(Spain) M. Ortega / (Portugal) S. Araújo	6	4	6
7	(Argentina) A. Osoro / (Spain) J. Castelló	2	2
2	(Argentina) D. Brea / (Spain) G. Triay	6	6

Finals
3	(Spain) M. Ortega / (Portugal) S. Araújo	3	1
2	(Argentina) D. Brea / (Spain) G. Triay	6	6

== Results ==
=== Round of 32 ===
Men's

Date	Winners	Score	Opponent	Refs.
12/3/2025	(Argentina) Axel Guevara (Argentina) Manuel Gayone	6–4 / 6–3	(Spain) Roberto Belmont (Spain) Victor Tur Checa	
11/3/2025	(Argentina) Julian Lacamoire (Egypt) Youssef Hossam	6–3 / 6–4	(Argentina) Juan Argañaras (Argentina) Oscar Almada	
11/3/2025	(Spain) Alejandro Jerez (Belgium) Clement Geens	7–6 / 6–2	(France) Julien Seurin (France) Philemon Raichman	
12/3/2025	(Spain) Alberto Jimenez (United Kingdom) Christian Murphy	1–6 / 6–3 / 6–3	(Chile) Cristobal Martinez (Argentina) Pablo Molina	
12/3/2025	(Paraguay) Facundo Dehnike (Spain) Manuel Aragon	7–5 / 6–2	(Netherlands) Bram Meijer (Netherlands) Sten Richters	
12/3/2025	(Spain) Marc Sintes (Spain) Nacho Moragues	6–4 / 6–2	(Mexico) Juan Castillo (Mexico) Luis Barrientos	
11/3/2025	(Spain) Manuel Castaño (Italy) Nicolás Suescun	6–3 / 6–4	(Spain) Boris Castro García (Italy) Enzo Jensen	
11/3/2025	(Italy) Emiliano Iriart (Italy) Mauro Salandro	3–6 / 6–1 / 7–6	(Spain) Adrián Naranjo (Spain) Christian Fuster	
12/3/2025	(Spain) Jaume Barcelo (Italy) Simone Cremona	6–1 / 7–6	(Spain) Joel Olivera (Argentina) Teo Gamondi	
12/3/2025	(Sweden) Adam Axelsson (Sweden) Simon Vasquez	6–0 / 6–4	(Spain) Pau Ortinez (Netherlands) Thijs Roper	
12/3/2025	(Mexico) Diego Arredondo (Mexico) Jose Padilla	6–4 / 6–3	(Spain) Jaime Fermosell (Italy) Pier Giulio Farabbi	
12/3/2025	(Spain) Andres Fernandez Lancha (Spain) Rodrigo Coello	6–4 / 6–3	(Spain) Antonio Varo Ramos (Spain) Pablo Reina	

Women's

Date	Winners	Score	Opponent	Refs.
12/3/2025	(Spain) Jimena Velasco (Spain) Noa Canovas	6–1 / 4–6 / 6–4	(Spain) Laura Rodriguez (Spain) Marta Arellano	
12/3/2025	(Russia) Ksenia Sharifova (Spain) Marta Talavan	6–4 / 6–2	(Spain) Agueda Perez (Spain) Melania Merino	
12/3/2025	(Spain) Ariadna Cañellas (Spain) Lucía Peralta	6–1 / 3–6 / 7–5	(Italy) Giorgia Marchetti (Spain) Sara Ruiz	
12/3/2025	(Italy) Carolina Orsi (Spain) Nuria Rodriguez	6–3 / 4–6 / 6–2	(Spain) Lara Arruabarrena (Spain) Lorena Rufo	
12/3/2025	(Spain) Marina Martinez Lobo (Spain) Sofía Saiz Vallejo	7–6 / 6–2	(Spain) Noemi Aguilar (Spain) Teresa Navarro	
12/3/2025	(Portugal) Ana Catarina Nogueira (Argentina) Martina Fassio Goyeneche	7–6 / 6–7 / 6–2	(Spain) Arantxa Soriano (Sweden) Carolina Navarro	
12/3/2025	(France) Alix Collombon (Spain) Araceli Martinez	6–1 / 6–4	(Spain) Jana Montes (Spain) Julia Polo Bautista	
12/3/2025	(Spain) Marta Marrero (Argentina) Virginia Riera	6–0 / 6–0	(Mexico) Camila Ramme Coellar (Mexico) Luisa De la Peña	

=== Round of 16 ===
Men's

Date	Winners	Score	Opponent	Refs.
13/3/2025	(Argentina) Franco Stupaczuk (Spain) Juan Lebrón	6–1 / 6–0	(Argentina) Axel Guevara (Argentina) Manuel Gayone	
13/3/2025	(Spain) Alejandro Jerez (Belgium) Clement Geens	6–3 / 6–2	(Argentina) Julian Lacamoire (Egypt) Youssef Hossam	
13/3/2025	(Spain) Alberto Jimenez (United Kingdom) Christian Murphy	6–4 / 6–3	(Paraguay) Facundo Dehnike (Spain) Manuel Aragon	
13/3/2025	(Spain) Marc Sintes (Spain) Nacho Moragues	6–4 / 7–6	(Portugal) Gustavo Nunes (Spain) Miguel Solbes	
13/3/2025	(Argentina) Gonzalo Alfonso (Argentina) Leonel Aguirre	7–5 / 6–7 / 6–3	(Spain) Manuel Castaño (Italy) Nicolás Suescun	
13/3/2025	(Spain) Jaume Barcelo (Italy) Simone Cremona	7–5 / 6–7 / 6–4	(Italy) Emiliano Iriart (Italy) Mauro Salandro	
13/3/2025	(Sweden) Adam Axelsson (Sweden) Simon Vasquez	6–2 / 6–3	(Mexico) Diego Arredondo (Mexico) Jose Padilla	
13/3/2025	(Spain) Diego García (Spain) Francisco Cabeza	4–6 / 6–4 / 6–1	(Spain) Andres Fernandez Lancha (Spain) Rodrigo Coello	

Women's

Date	Winners	Score	Opponent	Refs.
13/3/2025	(Spain) Ariana Sánchez (Spain) Paula Josemaría	6–4 / 6–0	(Spain) Jimena Velasco (Spain) Noa Canovas	
13/3/2025	(Spain) Alejandra Salazar (Spain) Verónica Virseda	3–6 / 6–1 / 6–2	(Russia) Ksenia Sharifova (Spain) Marta Talavan	
13/3/2025	(Argentina) Claudia Jensen (Spain) Tamara Icardo	6–2 / 6–1	(Spain) Ariadna Cañellas (Spain) Lucía Peralta	
13/3/2025	(Spain) Marta Ortega (Portugal) Sofia Araújo	6–4 / 6–4	(Italy) Carolina Orsi (Spain) Nuria Rodriguez	
13/3/2025	(Spain) Lucía Sainz (Spain) Patricia Llaguno	6–1 / 6–0	(Spain) Marina Martinez Lobo (Spain) Sofía Saiz Vallejo	
13/3/2025	(Argentina) Aranzazu Osoro (Spain) Jessica Castelló	7–5 / 6–3	(Portugal) Ana Catarina Nogueira (Argentina) Martina Fassio Goyeneche	
13/3/2025	(Spain) Alejandra Alonso (Spain) Andrea Ustero	3–6 / 7–6 / 6–2	(France) Alix Collombon (Spain) Araceli Martinez	
13/3/2025	(Argentina) Delfina Brea (Spain) Gemma Triay	6–4 / 6–1	(Spain) Marta Marrero (Argentina) Virginia Riera	

=== Quarter-Finals ===
Men's

Date	Winners	Score	Opponent	Refs.
14/3/2025	(Argentina) Franco Stupaczuk (Spain) Juan Lebrón	6–2 / 6–4	(Spain) Alejandro Jerez (Belgium) Clement Geens	
14/3/2025	(Spain) Marc Sintes (Spain) Nacho Moragues	4–6 / 6–2 / 6–3	(Spain) Alberto Jimenez (United Kingdom) Christian Murphy	
14/3/2025	(Argentina) Gonzalo Alfonso (Argentina) Leonel Aguirre	7–6 / 6–2	(Spain) Jaume Barcelo (Italy) Simone Cremona	
14/3/2025	(Sweden) Adam Axelsson (Sweden) Simon Vasquez	7–6 / 6–3	(Spain) Diego García (Spain) Francisco Cabeza	

Women's

Date	Winners	Score	Opponent	Refs.
14/3/2025	(Spain) Ariana Sánchez (Spain) Paula Josemaría	6–3 / 7–6	(Spain) Alejandra Salazar (Spain) Verónica Virseda	
14/3/2025	(Spain) Marta Ortega (Portugal) Sofia Araújo	6–1 / 6–3	(Argentina) Claudia Jensen (Spain) Tamara Icardo	
14/3/2025	(Argentina) Aranzazu Osoro (Spain) Jessica Castelló	4–6 / 6–1 / 6–2	(Spain) Lucía Sainz (Spain) Patricia Llaguno	
14/3/2025	(Argentina) Delfina Brea (Spain) Gemma Triay	6–2 / 6–1	(Spain) Alejandra Alonso (Spain) Andrea Ustero	

=== Semi-Finals ===
Men's

Date	Winners	Score	Opponent	Refs.
15/3/2025	(Argentina) Franco Stupaczuk (Spain) Juan Lebrón	6–1 / 6–2	(Spain) Marc Sintes (Spain) Nacho Moragues	
15/3/2025	(Argentina) Gonzalo Alfonso (Argentina) Leonel Aguirre	6–1 / 6–4	(Sweden) Adam Axelsson (Sweden) Simon Vasquez	

Women's

Date	Winners	Score	Opponent	Refs.
15/3/2025	(Spain) Marta Ortega (Portugal) Sofia Araújo	6–2 / 4–6 / 6–4	(Spain) Ariana Sánchez (Spain) Paula Josemaría	
15/3/2025	(Argentina) Delfina Brea (Spain) Gemma Triay	6–2 / 6–2	(Argentina) Aranzazu Osoro (Spain) Jessica Castelló	

=== Finals ===
Men's

Date	Winners	Score	Opponent	Refs.
16/3/2025	(Argentina) Franco Stupaczuk (Spain) Juan Lebrón	6–2 / 6–3	(Argentina) Gonzalo Alfonso (Argentina) Leonel Aguirre	

Women's

Date	Winners	Score	Opponent	Refs.
16/3/2025	(Argentina) Delfina Brea (Spain) Gemma Triay	6–3 / 6–1	(Spain) Marta Ortega (Portugal) Sofia Araújo	
