= 2024 Acapulco P1 =

Padel championships

- Date: 17 March – 24 March
- Edition: 1st
- Category: P1
- Prize money: €470.000
- Location: Acapulco, Mexico
- Venue: Arena GNP Seguros

Champions
- Men's doubles: (Argentina) Agustín Tapia (Spain) Arturo Coello
- Women's doubles: (Argentina) Claudia Jensen (Spain) Jéssica Castelló

Chronology

The 2024 Acapulco P1 (officially 2024 GNP Acapulco P1 Premier Padel) was the third tournament of the third season organized by Premier Padel, promoted by the International Padel Federation, and with the financial backing of Nasser Al-Khelaïfi's Qatar Sports Investments, now serving as the premier padel circuit.

In the women's division, the sixth and seventh FIP ranked teams surprisingly met in the finals. Claudia Jensen and Jéssica Castelló (6th ranked) defeated Claudia Fernandez/Gemma Triay (3rd ranked) in the quarter-finals and Bea Gonzalez/Delfina Brea (2nd ranked) in the semi-finals on their route to the finals, where they would met and defeated Sofía Araujo and Virgínia Riera (7th ranked) in two sets, winning their first title together.

In the men's division, Alejandro Galán and Juan Lebrón after three hard fought sets defeated Franco Stupaczuk and Martin Di Nenno in the semi-finals, reaching the finals where they would attempt to defeated the No. 1 ranked Agustín Tapia and Arturo Coello in their last dance. However, in the Spanish duo last match together, Coello and Tapia would defeat them to win their second title of the season.

== Relevant Data ==
=== Galán-Lebrón Split ===
Before the tournament, following the controversy between Lebrón and Mike Yanguas in Riyadh, Alejandro Galán announced that this would be his final tournament alongside Juan Lebrón, bringing their partnership of over four years to an end. Galán and Lebrón concluded their partnership having finished three seasons as the world number ranked team, competed in 91 tournaments, reaching 48 finals and winning 33.

=== Winners for the first time ===
In the women's division, Claudia Jensen and Jéssica Castelló broke a streak of 64 consecutive tournaments without a first-time winning pair, taking down the No. 2 and No. 3 seeds en route to the title.

== Seeds ==
Male

Rnk.	Team	FIP Ranking Points
1	(Argentina) Agustín Tapia (Spain) Arturo Coello	23421
2	(Spain) Alejandro Galán (Spain) Juan Lebrón	22426
3	(Argentina) Franco Stupaczuk (Argentina) Martin Di Nenno	18908
4	(Spain) Paquito Navarro (Argentina) Sanyo Gutiérrez	12579
5	(Argentina) Federico Chingotto (Spain) Momo Gonzalez	11200
6	(Argentina) Fernando Belasteguín (Argentina) Lucho Capra	9261
7	(Spain) Javi Garrido (Argentina) Miguel Yanguas	7468
8	(Spain) Coki Jorge (Spain) Jon Sanz	5874

Female

Rnk.	Team	FIP Ranking Points
1	(Spain) Ariana Sanchez (Spain) Paula Josemaria	27746
2	(Spain) Beatriz Gonzalez (Argentina) Delfina Brea	17697
3	(Spain) Gemma Triay (Spain) Claudia Fernandez	12322
4	(Spain) Marta Ortega (Spain) Veronica Virseda	11329
5	(Spain) Alejandra Salazar (Spain) Tamara Icardo	10844
6	(Portugal) Sofia Araújo (Argentina) Virginia Riera	8150
7	(Argentina) Claudia Jensen (Spain) Jessica Castello	7996
8	(Argentina) Lucia Sainz (Spain) Patty Llaguno	5176

== Head-to-head record between teams ranked in the top 4 during the season ==
=== Man's ===
Event	Coello–Tapia	Galán–Lebrón	Di Nenno–Stupaczuk	Paquito–Sanyo
Coello–Tapia	—	1–1	—	2–0
Galán–Lebrón	1–1	—	2–0	—
Di Nenno–Stupaczuk	—	0–2	—	—
Paquito–Sanyo	0–2	—	—	—

=== Women's ===
Event	Ariana–Paula	Gonzalez–D. Brea	Fernandez–Triay	Ortega–Virseda	Former Pairs	Ortega–Triay	Icardo–Salazar
Ariana–Paula	—	1–0	1–0	1–0		—	1–0
B. Gonzalez–D. Brea	0–1	—	—	—		—	—
Fernandez–Triay	0–1	—	—	—		—	—
Ortega–Virseda	0–1	—	—	—		—	—
Former Pairs							
Ortega–Triay	—	—	—	—		—	—
Icardo–Salazar	0–1	—	—	—		—	—

== Draws ==
=== Men's Bracket ===
Round of 32
1	(Spain) Coello / (Argentina) Tapia	7	6
(Spain) I. Ramirez / (Spain) P.G. Rodrigo	5	1
Q	(Argentina) L. Augsburger / (Argentina) V. Libaak	2	2
16	(Spain) Javi Ruiz / (Spain) P. Cardona	6	6
14	(Spain) J. Rico / (Spain) J. Esbri	6	6
Q	(Argentina) F. Mouriño / (Spain) V. Mena Gil	2	3
(Sweden) D. Windahl / (Spain) J. Marmolejo	5	0
5	(Argentina) F. Chingotto / (Spain) Momo	7	3	*
6	(Argentina) F. Belasteguín / (Argentina) L. Capra	3	4
(Spain) J.G. Barahona / (Spain) J.G. Mora	6	6
(Spain) M. Semmler / (Spain) P. Lijó	6	2
12	(Spain) A. Arroyo / (Spain) E. Alonso	7	6
13	(Argentina) A. Gutiérrez / (Brazil) L. Campagnolo	6	6
(Spain) I. Vilariño / (Spain) J. Rico	0	2
(Argentina) A. Silingo / (Portugal) G. Nunes	1	1
4	(Spain) Paquito / (Argentina) Sanyo	6	6
3	(Argentina) F. Stupaczuk / (Argentina) Di Nenno	6	6
(Spain) J. Ruiz / (Argentina) C.G. Gutiérrez	1	1
(Italy) A. Patiniotis / (Italy) F. Dominguez	6	6
15	(Argentina) J.C. Belluati / (Spain) P. Fernandez	3	2
10	(Spain) G. Rubio / (Argentina) Maxi	4	1
(Argentina) I. Sager / (Spain) S. Oria	6	6
(Spain) J. Leal / (Spain) J.G. Diestro	3	3
8	(Spain) Coki / (Spain) J. Sanz	6	6
7	(Spain) J. Garrido / (Spain) Yanguas	6	6
(Argentina) A. Chozas / (Italy) D. Perino	2	0
(Spain) D. Gil / (Spain) J. Moya	4	6
11	(Spain) F. Gil / (Argentina) R. Moyano	6	7
9	(Brazil) L. Bergamini / (Spain) V. Ruiz	2	3
(Spain) D. Santigosa / (Spain) M. García	6	6
(Spain) J. Munoz / (Spain) J. Bautista	6	3	4
2	(Spain) Galán / (Spain) Lebrón	2	6	6

Round of 16
1	(Spain) Coello / (Argentina) Tapia	6	6
16	(Spain) Javi Ruiz / (Spain) P. Cardona	1	1
14	(Spain) J. Rico / (Spain) J. Esbri	2	4
5	(Argentina) F. Chingotto / (Spain) Momo	6	6
(Spain) J.G. Barahona / (Spain) J.G. Mora	6	1	2
12	(Spain) A. Arroyo / (Spain) E. Alonso	4	6	6
13	(Argentina) A. Gutiérrez / (Brazil) L. Campagnolo	3	6	0
4	(Spain) Paquito / (Argentina) Sanyo	6	1	6
3	(Argentina) F. Stupaczuk / (Argentina) Di Nenno	6	6
(Italy) A. Patiniotis / (Italy) F. Dominguez	3	0
(Argentina) I. Sager / (Spain) S. Oria	3	3
8	(Spain) Coki / (Spain) J. Sanz	6	6
7	(Spain) J. Garrido / (Spain) Yanguas	6	6	6
11	(Spain) F. Gil / (Argentina) R. Moyano	2	7	3
Q	(Spain) D. Santigosa / (Spain) M. García	2	1
2	(Spain) Galán / (Spain) Lebrón	6	6

Quarter-Final
1	(Spain) Coello / (Argentina) Tapia	6	6
5	(Argentina) F. Chingotto / (Spain) Momo	1	2
12	(Spain) A. Arroyo / (Spain) E. Alonso	0	4
4	(Spain) Paquito / (Argentina) Sanyo	6	6
3	(Argentina) F. Stupaczuk / (Argentina) Di Nenno	6	4	6
8	(Spain) Coki / (Spain) J. Sanz	4	6	0
7	(Spain) J. Garrido / (Spain) Yanguas	4	2
2	(Spain) Galán / (Spain) Lebrón	6	6

Semi-Finals
1	(Spain) Coello / (Argentina) Tapia	6	7
4	(Spain) Paquito / (Argentina) Sanyo	3	5
3	(Argentina) F. Stupaczuk / (Argentina) Di Nenno	6	6	2
2	(Spain) Galán / (Spain) Lebrón	7	2	6

Finals
1	(Spain) Coello / (Argentina) Tapia	6	6
2	(Spain) Galán / (Spain) Lebrón	0	4

=== Women's Bracket ===
Round of 32
1	(Spain) A. Sanchez / (Spain) P. Josemaria	6
(Italy) C. Casali / (Spain) L. Arruabarrena	1	3
(Spain) E. Carnicero / (Russia) K. Sharifova	4	2
(Portugal) A. Nogueira / (Spain) B. Sanchez	6	6
Q	(Spain) C. Castillon / (Brazil) R. Piltcher	1	3
(Spain) J. Velasco / (Spain) N. Canovas	6	6
WC	(Mexico) A. Cabrejas / (Mexico) C. Coellar	1	1
6	(Portugal) S. Araújo / (Argentina) V. Riera	6	6
5	(Spain) A. Salazar / (Spain) T. Icardo	6	6
(France) A.Collombon / (Argentina) J. Bidahorria	1	1
(Argentina) A. Osoro / (Spain) V. Virseda	6	6
(Spain) L. Vano / (Brazil) M. Schuck	2	3
(Spain) M. Abajo / (Spain) S. Bellver	5	4
(Spain) A. Ustero / (Spain) A. Alonso	7	6
(Spain) L. Rufo / (Spain) L. Martinez	4	2
4	(Spain) M. Ortega / (Spain) V. Virseda	6	6	*
3	(Spain) C. Fernandez / (Spain) G. Triay	6	6
(Spain) M. Barrera / (Spain) M. Caparros	2	1
Q	(Spain) L. Manquillo / (Spain) N. Aguilar	2	4
(Spain) A. Perez / (Spain) P. Martinez	6	6
(Spain) M. Merino / (Spain) S. Saiz	6	6
(Spain) J. Bautista / (Portugal) P. Ribeiro	4	2
(Sweden) C. Navarro / (Spain) M. Guinart	3	1
7	(Argentina) C. Jensen / (Spain) J. Castello	6	6
8	(Spain) L. Sainz / (Spain) P. Llaguno	6	6
Q	(Spain) M. Navarro / (Spain) N. Vivancos	1	1
(Spain) M. Talavan / (Spain) N. Rodriguez	3	7	6
(Spain) A. Cañellas / (Spain) T. Navarro	6	5	1
(Italy) C. Orsi / (Spain) M. Lobo	6	6	3
(Spain) A. Martinez / (Spain) S. Ruiz	7	1	6
(Spain) M. Goyenche / (Spain) M. Borrero	3	2
2	(Spain) B. Gonzalez / (Argentina) D. Brea	6	6

Round of 16
1	(Spain) A. Sanchez / (Spain) P. Josemaria	6	6
(Portugal) A. Nogueira / (Spain) B. Sanchez	7	7
(Spain) J. Velasco / (Spain) N. Canovas	2	2
6	(Portugal) S. Araújo / (Argentina) V. Riera	6	6
5	(Spain) A. Salazar / (Spain) T. Icardo	6	2	2
(Argentina) A. Osoro / (Spain) V. Virseda	2	6	6
(Spain) A. Ustero / (Spain) A. Alonso	2	6	6
4	(Spain) M. Ortega / (Spain) V. Virseda	6	2	2
3	(Spain) C. Fernandez / (Spain) G. Triay	6	6
(Spain) A. Perez / (Spain) P. Martinez	2	2
(Spain) M. Merino / (Spain) S. Saiz	1	4
7	(Argentina) C. Jensen / (Spain) J. Castello	6	6
8	(Spain) L. Sainz / (Spain) P. Llaguno	6	6
(Spain) M. Talavan / (Spain) N. Rodriguez	3	0
(Spain) A. Martinez / (Spain) S. Ruiz	2	2
2	(Spain) B. Gonzalez / (Argentina) D. Brea	6	6

Quarter-Final
(Portugal) A. Nogueira / (Spain) B. Sanchez	4	2
6	(Portugal) S. Araújo / (Argentina) V. Riera	6	6
(Argentina) A. Osoro / (Spain) V. Virseda	2	2
(Spain) A. Ustero / (Spain) A. Alonso	6	6
3	(Spain) C. Fernandez / (Spain) G. Triay	7	2	2
7	(Argentina) C. Jensen / (Spain) J. Castello	6	6	6
8	(Spain) L. Sainz / (Spain) P. Llaguno	2	3
2	(Spain) B. Gonzalez / (Argentina) D. Brea	6	6

Semi-Finals
6	(Portugal) S. Araújo / (Argentina) V. Riera	4	6	6
(Spain) A. Ustero / (Spain) A. Alonso	6	1	4
7	(Argentina) C. Jensen / (Spain) J. Castello	7	6
2	(Spain) B. Gonzalez / (Argentina) D. Brea	5	3

Finals
6	(Portugal) S. Araújo / (Argentina) V. Riera	3	4
7	(Argentina) C. Jensen / (Spain) J. Castello	6	6

== Results ==
=== First Round ===
Men's

Date	Winners	Score	Opponent	Refs.
19/3/2024	(Spain) Ivan Ramirez (Spain) Pablo García Rodrigo	2–6 / 6–3 / 6–3	(Chile) Javier Valdes (Spain) Rafael Méndez	
19/3/2024	(Argentina) Leandro Augsburger (Argentina) Valentino Libaak	6–3 / 6–0	(Mexico) José Angel Montoya (Mexico) José Pablo Padilla	
19/3/2024	(Argentina) Federico Mouriño (Spain) Victor Mena Gil	2–6 / 6–1 / 6–3	(Spain) Enrique Goenaga (Spain) Teodor Zapata	
19/3/2024	(Sweden) Daniel Windahl (Spain) Jose Solano Marmolejo	1–6 / 6–3 / 6–1	(Spain) Antonio Luque (Spain) Jose Luis Gonzalez	
19/3/2024	(Spain) Javier Gonzalez Barahona (Spain) Javier García Mora	6–4 / 6–4	(Argentina) Emiliano Iriart (Spain) Marcos Cordoba	
19/3/2024	(Spain) Miguel Semmler (Spain) Pablo Lijó	6–1 / 6–3	(Spain) Jose Jimenez Casas (Argentina) Miguel Lamperti	
19/3/2024	(Spain) Ignacio Vilariño (Spain) Jose Rico	6–4 / 3–6 / 6–3	(Spain) Alonso Rodriguez Martinez (Spain) Javier Martinez Vazquez	
19/3/2024	(Argentina) Agustin Gomez Silingo (Portugal) Gustavo Nunes	7–6 / 6–2	(Ecuador) Carlos Luna (Spain) Miguel Benítez Lara	
19/3/2024	(Argentina) Cristian German Gutiérrez (Spain) Jorge Ruiz Gutiérrez	6–3 / 6–2	(Spain) Marc Quilez (Spain) Toni Bueno	
19/3/2024	(Italy) Aris Patiniotis (Italy) Facundo Dominguez	6–2 / 6–2	(Argentina) Maximiliano Cejas (Argentina) Matías Gutiérrez	
19/3/2024	(Spain) Ignacio Sager (Spain) Salvador Oria	3–6 / 7–6 / 6–4	(Spain) Iñigo Jofre (Spain) Luis Hernandez Quesada	
19/3/2024	(Spain) Javi Leal (Spain) Jose García Diestro	6–3 / 3–6 / 6–0	(Spain) Alvaro Cépero (Spain) Jose David Sanchez Serrano	
19/3/2024	(Argentina) Alex Chozas (Italy) Denis Perino	6–2 / 6–2	(Argentina) Amilcar Miky Bejarano (Mexico) Luis Enrique Barrientos	
19/3/2024	(Spain) Diego Gil Batista (Spain) Jesus Moya	6–3 / 3–1 / W.O.	(Spain) Gonzalo Perez Arbona (Spain) Javier Rodriguez Marquez	
19/3/2024	(Spain) Daniel Santigosa (Spain) Miguel Gonzalez García	6–3 / 6–1	(Spain) Arnau Ayats (Argentina) Francisco Guerrero	
19/3/2024	(Spain) Jaime Munoz (Spain) Jairo Bautista	6–3 / 6–3	(Spain) Raul Marcos Duran (Spain) Sergio Alba	

=== Round of 32 ===
Men's

Date	Winners	Score	Opponent	Refs.
20/3/2024	(Argentina) Agustín Tapia (Spain) Arturo Coello	7–5 / 6–1	(Spain) Ivan Ramirez (Spain) Pablo García Rodrigo	
20/3/2024	(Spain) Javi Ruiz (Spain) Pablo Cardona	6–2 / 6–2	(Argentina) Leandro Augsburger (Argentina) Valentino Libaak	
20/3/2024	(Spain) Javi Rico (Spain) Juanlu Esbri	6–2 / 6–3	(Argentina) Federico Mouriño (Spain) Victor Mena Gil	
20/3/2024	(Argentina) Federico Chingotto (Spain) Momo Gonzalez	7–5 / 3–0 / W.O.	(Sweden) Daniel Windahl (Spain) Jose Solano Marmolejo	
20/3/2024	(Spain) Javier Gonzalez Barahona (Spain) Javier García Mora	6–3 / 6–4	(Argentina) Fernando Belasteguín (Argentina) Lucho Capra	
20/3/2024	(Spain) Alejandro Arroyo (Spain) Eduardo Alonso	7–6 / 6–2	(Spain) Miguel Semmler (Spain) Pablo Lijó	
20/3/2024	(Argentina) Agustin Gutiérrez (Brazil) Lucas Campagnolo	6–0 / 6–2	(Spain) Ignacio Vilariño (Spain) Jose Rico	
20/3/2024	(Spain) Paquito Navarro (Argentina) Sanyo Gutiérrez	6–1 / 6–1	(Argentina) Agustin Gomez Silingo (Portugal) Gustavo Nunes	
20/3/2024	(Argentina) Franco Stupaczuk (Argentina) Martin Di Nenno	6–1 / 6–1	(Argentina) Cristian German Gutiérrez (Spain) Jorge Ruiz Gutiérrez	
20/3/2024	(Italy) Aris Patiniotis (Italy) Facundo Dominguez	6–3 / 6–2	(Argentina) Juan Cruz Belluati (Spain) Pincho Fernandez	
20/3/2024	(Spain) Ignacio Sager (Spain) Salvador Oria	6–4 / 6–1	(Spain) Gonzalo Rubio (Argentina) Maxi Sánchez	
20/3/2024	(Spain) Coki Nieto (Spain) Jon Sanz	6–3 / 6–3	(Spain) Javi Leal (Spain) Jose García Diestro	
20/3/2024	(Spain) Javier Garridoz (Spain) Mike Yanguas	6–2 / 6–0	(Argentina) Alex Chozas (Italy) Denis Perino	
20/3/2024	(Spain) Francisco Gil Morales (Argentina) Ramiro Moyano	6–4 / 7–6	(Spain) Diego Gil Batista (Spain) Jesus Moya	
20/3/2024	(Spain) Daniel Santigosa (Spain) Miguel Gonzalez García	6–2 / 6–3	(Brazil) Lucas Bergamini (Spain) Víctor Ruiz	
20/3/2024	(Spain) Alejandro Galán (Spain) Juan Lebrón	2–6 / 6–3 / 6–4	(Spain) Jaime Munoz (Spain) Jairo Bautista	

Women's

Date	Winners	Score	Opponent	Refs.
20/3/2024	(Spain) Ariana Sánchez (Spain) Paula Josemaria	6–1 / 6–3	(Italy) Carlotta Casali (Spain) Lara Arruabarrena	
20/3/2024	(Portugal) Ana Catarina Nogueira (Spain) Beatriz Caldera	6–4 / 6–2	(Spain) Esther Carnicero (Russia) Ksenia Sharifova	
20/3/2024	(Spain) Noa Canovas (Spain) Jimena Velasco	6–1 / 6–3	(Spain) Carmen Castillon (Brazil) Raquel Piltcher	
20/3/2024	(Portugal) Sofia Araújo (Argentina) Virginia Riera	6–1 / 6–1	(Mexico) Ana Maria Cabrejas Ruiz (Mexico) Camila Ramme Coellar	
20/3/2024	(Spain) Alejandra Salazar (Spain) Tamara Icardo	6–1 / 6–1	(France) Alix Collombon (France) Julieta Bidahorria	
20/3/2024	(Argentina) Aranzazu Osoro (Spain) Carmen Goenaga	6–2 / 6–3	(Italy) Lorena Vano (Brazil) Manuela Schuck	
20/3/2024	(Spain) Alejandra Alonso (Spain) Andrea Ustero	7–5 / 6–4	(Spain) Laia Rodriguez Abajo (Spain) Sandra Bellver	
20/3/2024	(Spain) Marta Ortega (Spain) Veronica Virseda	6–4 / 5–2 / W.O.	(Spain) Lorena Rufo (Spain) Lucía Martínez	
20/3/2024	(Spain) Claudia Fernandez (Spain) Gemma Triay	6–2 / 6–1	(Spain) Marta Barrera (Spain) Marta Caparrós	
20/3/2024	(Spain) Agueda Perez Ortiz (Spain) Patricia Martínez Fortun	6–2 / 6–4	(Spain) Letizia Manquillo (Spain) Noemi Aguilar	
20/3/2024	(Spain) Melania Merino (Spain) Sofía Saiz	6–4 / 6–2	(Spain) Julia Polo Bautista (Portugal) Patricia Maria Ribeiro	
20/3/2024	(Argentina) Claudia Jensen (Spain) Jessica Castelló	6–3 / 6–1	(Sweden) Carolina Navarro (Spain) Marina Guinart	
20/3/2024	(Spain) Lucia Sainz (Spain) Patty Llaguno	6–1 / 6–1	(Spain) Marta Arellano Navarro (Spain) Nuria Vivancos	
20/3/2024	(Spain) Marta Talavan (Spain) Nuria Rodriguez	3–6 / 7–5 / 6–1	(Spain) Ariadna Cañellas (Spain) Teresa Navarro	
20/3/2024	(Spain) Araceli Martinez (Spain) Sara Ruiz	7–6 / 1–6 / 6–3	(Italy) Carolina Orsi (Spain) Marina Martinez Lobo	
20/3/2024	(Spain) Bea González (Argentina) Delfina Brea	6–3 / 6–2	(Spain) Marta Borrero (Spain) Martina Fassio	

=== Round of 16 ===
Men's

Date	Winners	Score	Opponent	Refs.
21/3/2024	(Argentina) Agustín Tapia (Spain) Arturo Coello	6–1 / 6–1	(Spain) Javi Ruiz (Spain) Pablo Cardona	
21/3/2024	(Argentina) Federico Chingotto (Spain) Momo Gonzalez	6–2 / 6–4	(Spain) Javi Rico (Spain) Juanlu Esbri	
21/3/2024	(Spain) Alejandro Arroyo (Spain) Eduardo Alonso	4–6 / 6–1 / 6–2	(Spain) Javier Gonzalez Barahona (Spain) Javier García Mora	
21/3/2024	(Spain) Paquito Navarro (Argentina) Sanyo Gutiérrez	6–3 / 1–6 / 6–0	(Argentina) Agustin Gutiérrez (Brazil) Lucas Campagnolo	
21/3/2024	(Argentina) Franco Stupaczuk (Argentina) Martin Di Nenno	6–3 / 6–0	(Italy) Aris Patiniotis (Italy) Facundo Dominguez	
21/3/2024	(Spain) Coki Nieto (Spain) Jon Sanz	6–3 / 6–3	(Spain) Ignacio Sager (Spain) Salvador Oria	
21/3/2024	(Spain) Javier Garridoz (Spain) Mike Yanguas	6–2 / 6–7 / 6–3	(Spain) Francisco Gil Morales (Argentina) Ramiro Moyano	
21/3/2024	(Spain) Alejandro Galán (Spain) Juan Lebrón	6–2 / 6–1	(Spain) Daniel Santigosa (Spain) Miguel Gonzalez García	

Women's

Date	Winners	Score	Opponent	Refs.
21//3/2024	(Portugal) Ana Catarina Nogueira (Spain) Beatriz Caldera	7–6 / 7–6	(Spain) Ariana Sánchez (Spain) Paula Josemaria	
21//3/2024	(Portugal) Sofia Araújo (Argentina) Virginia Riera	6–2 / 6–2	(Spain) Noa Canovas (Spain) Jimena Velasco	
21//3/2024	(Argentina) Aranzazu Osoro (Spain) Carmen Goenaga	2–6 / 6–2 / 6–2	(Spain) Alejandra Salazar (Spain) Tamara Icardo	
21//3/2024	(Spain) Alejandra Alonso (Spain) Andrea Ustero	2–6 / 6–2 / 6–2	(Spain) Marta Ortega (Spain) Veronica Virseda	
21//3/2024	(Spain) Claudia Fernandez (Spain) Gemma Triay	6–1 / 6–2	(Spain) Agueda Perez Ortiz (Spain) Patricia Martínez Fortun	
21//3/2024	(Argentina) Claudia Jensen (Spain) Jessica Castelló	6–1 / 6–4	(Spain) Melania Merino (Spain) Sofía Saiz	
21//3/2024	(Spain) Lucia Sainz (Spain) Patty Llaguno	6–3 / 6–0	(Spain) Marta Talavan (Spain) Nuria Rodriguez	
21//3/2024	(Spain) Bea González (Argentina) Delfina Brea	6–2 / 6–2	(Spain) Araceli Martinez (Spain) Sara Ruiz	

=== Quarter-Finals ===
Men's

Date	Winners	Score	Opponent	Refs.
22/3/2024	(Argentina) Agustín Tapia (Spain) Arturo Coello	6–1 / 6–2	(Argentina) Federico Chingotto (Spain) Momo Gonzalez	
22/3/2024	(Spain) Paquito Navarro (Argentina) Sanyo Gutiérrez	6–0 / 6–4	(Spain) Alejandro Arroyo (Spain) Eduardo Alonso	
22/3/2024	(Argentina) Franco Stupaczuk (Argentina) Martin Di Nenno	6–4 / 4–6 / 6–0	(Spain) Coki Nieto (Spain) Jon Sanz	
22/3/2024	(Spain) Alejandro Galán (Spain) Juan Lebrón	6–4 / 6–2	(Spain) Javier Garridoz (Spain) Mike Yanguas	

Women's

Date	Winners	Score	Opponent	Refs.
22/3/2024	(Portugal) Sofia Araújo (Argentina) Virginia Riera	6–4 / 6–2	(Portugal) Ana Catarina Nogueira (Spain) Beatriz Caldera	
22/3/2024	(Spain) Alejandra Alonso (Spain) Andrea Ustero	6–2 / 6–2	(Argentina) Aranzazu Osoro (Spain) Carmen Goenaga	
22/3/2024	(Argentina) Claudia Jensen (Spain) Jessica Castelló	6–7 / 6–2 / 6–2	(Spain) Claudia Fernandez (Spain) Gemma Triay	
22/3/2024	(Spain) Bea González (Argentina) Delfina Brea	6–2 / 6–3	(Spain) Lucia Sainz (Spain) Patty Llaguno	

=== Semi-Finals ===
Men's

Date	Winners	Score	Opponent	Refs.
23/4/2023	(Argentina) Agustín Tapia (Spain) Arturo Coello	6–3 / 7–5	(Spain) Paquito Navarro (Argentina) Sanyo Gutiérrez	
23/4/2023	(Spain) Alejandro Galán (Spain) Juan Lebrón	7–6 / 2–6 / 6–2	(Argentina) Franco Stupaczuk (Argentina) Martin Di Nenno	

Women's

Date	Winners	Score	Opponent	Refs.
23/4/2024	(Portugal) Sofia Araújo (Argentina) Virginia Riera	4–6 / 6–1 / 6–4	(Spain) Alejandra Alonso (Spain) Andrea Ustero	
23/4/2024	(Argentina) Claudia Jensen (Spain) Jessica Castelló	7–5 / 6–3	(Spain) Bea González (Argentina) Delfina Brea	

=== Finals ===
Men's

Date	Winners	Score	Opponent	Refs.
24/3/2024	(Argentina) Agustín Tapia (Spain) Arturo Coello	6–0 / 6–4	(Spain) Alejandro Galán (Spain) Juan Lebrón	

Women's

Date	Winners	Score	Opponent	Refs.
24/3/2024	(Argentina) Claudia Jensen (Spain) Jessica Castelló	6–3 / 6–4	(Portugal) Sofia Araújo (Argentina) Virginia Riera	
