= Sofia Araújo =

Portuguese tennis and padel player (born 1994)

Personal information
- Born: 30 November 1994 (age 31) Lisbon, Portugal
- Height: 1.72 m (5 ft 7 1/2 in)

Sport
- Country: Portugal
- Sport: Tennis (formerly); Pádel
- Position: Revés (left-side)
- Rank: 8th (PP)

Achievements and titles
- Highest world ranking: 7th (in 2025 Premier Padel); 904 (in tennis dobules, on 27 May 2013); 926 (in tennis singles, on 18 October 2010)

Sofia Araújo (born 30 November 1994) is a Portuguese former professional tennis player and currently a professional padel player.

Since turning professional in padel at age 26, Sofia Araújo has steadily progressed, having played alongside three former world number ones. First she played with María José Sánchez Alayeto, then Alejandra Salazar, and currently Marta Ortega (in her third stint with her).

With nine tournament victories and 19 finals appearances (across both secondary and main circuits) to her name, Sofia currently holds the number 8 spot in the FIP rankings used by Premier Padel.

== Career ==
=== First steps in sports competition ===
Sofia Araújo began her career as a professional tennis player. On 18 October 2010, Araújo reached her best singles ranking of world number 926. On 27 May 2013, she peaked at world number 904 in the doubles rankings.

In April 2013, Araújo made her WTA tour debut at the 2013 Portugal Open playing alongside Joana Valle Costa in doubles, but lost to Nina Bratchikova and Varvara Lepchenko in the first round. However, shortly after her debut, she stepped away from the sport to study physiotherapy at university.

She eventually returned to sports after signing up for a padel tournament, where she teamed up with her mother. At 29, the Lisbon native left behind her hometown, family, friends, and physiotherapy career to pursue padel professionally. She moved to Madrid, thereby ending her two-year association with Benfica.

=== Breakthrough season ===
Her breakthrough season in women's padel came in 2020. In addition to winning four tournaments on the Cupra FIP Tour (the secondary circuit), she was named "Breakout Player" of the season by the World Padel Tour (the premier circuit at the time). The Portuguese player enjoyed the best season of her career on the world's top padel circuit, finishing the year by competing in the Master Final, a tournament reserved for the year's top 16 male and female players on the WPT.

Sofia, who played the entire season alongside Virginia Riera, reached the semifinals of the Madrid Open and three quarterfinals (Estrella Damm Open, Sardinia Open, and Menorca Open) in 2020. These results that left Araújo and Riera with 1,315 points at the conclusion of the nine tournaments held that year.

=== Breakthrough into the Padel elite ===
After regularly reaching the semifinals, the first final came in 2022 alongside former world number 1 Majo Sánchez at the Danish Open, against Beatriz Gonzaléz & Marta Ortega.

This performance would be improved in the following season, now playing with former world number 1 Alejandra Salazar. On the World Padel Tour circuit, the pair reached two Open 1000 finals (in Sweden and Finland), while in Premier Padel, they reached the final of the Milan P1.

=== More finals and first trophy ===
==== 2024 ====
2024 would prove to be her best season to date. After a start to the season featuring two modest tournament performances, Sofia, partnering with Virginia Riera, reached the final of the Acapulco P1, where they were defeated in straight sets.

In the eight subsequent tournaments, the pair consistently reached the quarterfinals but managed to advance beyond that stage only twice. However, at the Genoa P2, now playing alongside Marta Ortega, the Spanish-Portuguese duo not only reached the finals but also defeated the world number ones, Ariana Sánchez & Paula Josemaría, to claim the first major title of her career.

After a modest performance in the subsequent tournament, they reached the final again at the Finland P2, this time losing the rematch against Ariana & Paula. With three more semifinals and a quarterfinal appearances in the next four tournaments, Marta and Sofia reached another final at the Egypt P2, defeating Alejandra Salazar & Jessica Castelló to claim their second title as a pair.

The pair would reach another final in 2024, making it to the final of the Mexico Major, one of the season's four most important tournaments, but failed to defeat Claudia Fernández & Gemma Triay.

==== 2025 ====
Despite a decent start to the season featuring four consecutive semifinals, results deteriorated over the next three tournaments, with only one quarterfinal appearance. This slump led Marta and Sofia to part ways, with the Portuguese player teaming up with promising youngster Andrea Ustero.

After mixed results in their first four tournaments, Araújo and Ustero reached the final of the Bordeaux P2, where they defeated Beatriz Caldera and Carmen Goenaga to claim their first title together.

In the ten tournaments leading up to the end of the regular season, Araújo and Ustero reached another seven semifinals, however, despite their consistency in reaching the later stages, they failed to reach a final to play for a title. Their final tournament as a team was the Premier Finals, where they played for third place against Ariana Sánchez and Paula Josemaría, who were also set to part ways.

== Honours ==
Win Draw Loss

=== World Padel Tour (2013–2023) ===
==== Finals ====
N.º	Date	Tournament	Partner	Result	Opponents in the final	Career title No.
1.	22/05/2022	(Denmark) Danish Open	(Spain) Majo Sánchez	2–6 / 1–6	(Spain) Beatriz Gonzaléz (Spain) Marta Ortega	
2.	03/09/2023	Finland Open 1000	(Spain) Alejandra Salazar	1–6 / 4–6	(Spain) Beatriz Gonzaléz (Argentina) Delfina Brea	
3.	03/09/2023	(Sweden) Malmö Open 1000	(Spain) Alejandra Salazar	4–6 / 3–6	(Spain) Beatriz Gonzaléz (Argentina) Delfina Brea	

=== Premier Padel (2022–Present) ===
==== Finals ====
N.º	Date	Tournament	Partner	Result	Opponents in the final	Career title No.
4.	10/12/2023	(Italy) Milan P1	(Spain) Alejandra Salazar	0–6 / 6–7	(Spain) Beatriz Gonzaléz (Argentina) Delfina Brea	
5.	24/03/2024	(Mexico) Acapulco P1	(Argentina) Virginea Riera	3–6 / 4–6	(Argentina) Claudia Jensen (Spain) Jessica Castelló	
6.	07/07/2024	(Italy) Genoa P2	(Spain) Marta Ortega	6–3 / 7–6	(Spain) Ariana Sánchez (Spain) Paula Josemaría	1st
7.	04/08/2024	Finland P2	(Spain) Marta Ortega	3–6 / 1–6	(Spain) Ariana Sánchez (Spain) Paula Josemaría	
8.	26/10/2024	(Egypt) Giza P2	(Spain) Marta Ortega	6–4 / 6–2	(Spain) Alejandra Salazar (Spain) Jessica Castelló	2nd
9.	01/12/2024	Mexico Major	(Spain) Marta Ortega	7–6 / 1–6 / 4–6	(Spain) Claudia Fernández (Spain) Gemma Triay	
10.	16/03/2025	(Mexico) Cancún P2	(Spain) Marta Ortega	3–6 / 1–6	(Argentina) Delfina Brea (Spain) Gemma Triay	
11.	06/07/2025	(France) Bordeaux P2	(Spain) Andrea Ustero	7–5 / 2–6 / 6–2	(Spain) Beatriz Caldera (Spain) Carmen Goenaga	3rd
12.	14/06/2026	(Spain) Valencia P1	(Spain) Claudia Fernández	4–6 / 6–3 / 2–6	(Spain) Ariana Sánchez (Spain) Andrea Ustero	

=== Secondary circuits and titles ===
Win Draw Loss

==== Finals ====
N.º	Date	Tournament	Partner	Result	Opponents in the final	Career title No.
13.	26/01/2020	(Spain) FIP Star Burriana	(Argentina) Virginea Riera	—	—	4th
14.	01/11/2020	(Spain) FIP Star Elche	(Argentina) Virginea Riera	—	—	
15.	08/11/2020	(Spain) FIP Star Gran Canaria	(Argentina) Virginea Riera	—	—	5th
16.	20/12/2020	(Italy) Cupra FIP Finals 2020	(Argentina) Virginea Riera	7–5 / 6–2	(Spain) Anna Cortiles (Spain) Jessica Castelló	6th
17.	11/09/2022	(Italy) FIP Promotion Master Vpc	(Spain) Marta Talavan	6–0 / 6–2	(Spain) Nuria Rodriguez (Spain) Teresa Navarro	7th

==== Finals ====
N.º	Date	Tournament	Partner	Result	Opponents in the final	Career title No.
18.	03/10/2021	(Spain) Albacete Challenger	(Portugal) Ana Catarina Nogueira	3–6 / 7–6 / 6–3	(Spain) Beatriz Caldera (Spain) Carmen Goenaga	8th
19.	07/05/2023	(Spain) Alicante Open 500	(Spain) Marta Ortega	7–6 / 7–6	(Spain) Tamara Icardo (Argentina) Virginea Riera	9th
