= International Padel Federation =

Governing body of world padel tennis

- Federación Internacional de Padel
- Abbreviation: FIP
- Formation: 12 July 1991
- Founder: Argentine Padel Association, Spanish Padel Association, Uruguayan Padel Association
- Founded at: Madrid
- Headquarters: Madrid, Spain
- Region served: 5
- Members: 81
- Official language: Spanish, English
- Website: padelfip.com

The Federación Internacional de Pádel (FIP) (English: International Padel Federation) is the global governing body for the sport of padel. Founded in 1991 in Madrid by representatives from the Argentinian, Spanish, and Uruguayan Padel Federations, the FIP is a non-profit organization dedicated to promoting padel worldwide.

One of its key responsibilities is organizing the Padel World Championship for both male and female players.

== Qatar Airways Premier Padel Tour ==
Premier Padel
- Current season, competition or edition: 2026 Premier Padel season
- Sport: Padel
- Founded: 2022

In 2022, the FIP entered into a strategic partnership with Qatar Sports Investments (QSI), a Qatari investment fund known for its ownership of Paris Saint-Germain football club. This collaboration aimed to launch a new professional circuit called Premier Padel, governed by the FIP.

Following this partnership, QSI acquired the World Padel Tour (WPT) in 2023. Consequently, the WPT will no longer exist as a separate entity, and its players and tournaments will be integrated into the unified Premier Padel circuit overseen by the FIP.

In 2024, Premier Padel announced that it had entered into a title sponsorship agreement with Qatar Airways renaming the tour after the airline in a multi-year deal. The circuit also entered into a sponsorship agreement with an IT company NTT Data which will provide the sport with advanced analytics and real-time data as its official partner. Premier Padel's official betting partner with a multi-year agreement is the Swedish international betting firm Betsson.

== Nations Members ==
According to the official FIP website, these are the current existing Padel Federations:

=== Europe ===
- Albania
- Andorra
- Armenia
- Austria
- Azerbaijan
- Belgium
- Bulgaria
- Croatia
- Cyprus
- Czech Republic
- Denmark
- Estonia
- Finland
- France
- Georgia
- Germany
- Gibraltar
- Great Britain
- Greece
- Hungary
- Ireland
- Israel
- Italy
- Kosovo
- Latvia
- Lithuania
- Luxembourg
- Malta
- Moldova
- Monaco
- Montenegro
- Netherlands
- North Macedonia
- Norway
- Poland
- Portugal
- Russia
- Romania
- San Marino
- Serbia
- Slovakia
- Slovenia
- Spain
- Sweden
- Switzerland
- Turkey
- Ukraine
- Vatican City

=== Asia ===
- Bahrain
- Chinese Taipei
- China
- Hong Kong
- Indonesia
- India
- Iran
- Iraq
- Japan
- Jordan
- Kazakhstan
- Kuwait
- Lebanon
- Malaysia
- Maldives
- Mongolia
- Oman
- Pakistan
- Philippines
- Qatar
- Saudi Arabia
- South Korea
- Thailand
- United Arab Emirates
- Yemen

=== Americas ===
- Argentina
- Bolivia
- Brazil
- Canada
- Chile
- Dominican Republic
- Ecuador
- El Salvador
- Guatemala
- Mexico
- Panama
- Paraguay
- Uruguay
- United States
- Venezuela

=== Africa ===
- Ivory Coast
- Algeria
- Republic of the Congo
- Egypt
- Ghana
- Kenya
- Mauritania
- Morocco
- Senegal
- Rwanda
- Tunisia

=== Oceania ===
- Australia
- New Zealand
