= 2024 Premier Padel Finals =

Padel championships

- Date: 19 December – 22 December
- Edition: 1st
- Category: Finals
- Prize money: €600.000
- Location: Barcelona, Spain
- Venue: Palau Sant Jordi

Champions
- Men's doubles: (Spain) Coki Nieto (Spain) Jon Sanz
- Women's doubles: (Spain) Ariana Sánchez (Spain) Paula Josemaría

Chronology
Previous
Milan P1
Next
Riyadh P1
(2025)

The 2024 Premier Padel Finals was the twenty-fourth and final tournament of the third season organized by Premier Padel, promoted by the International Padel Federation, and with the financial backing of Nasser Al-Khelaïfi's Qatar Sports Investments, now serving as the premier padel circuit.

In the women's category, the season's "Superclásico" played out in a final for the sixth time, with the top two ranked pairs facing each other for the 12th time. World number ones Ariana Sánchez and Paula Josemaría defeated the second-ranked pair, Claudia Fernández and Gemma Triay, bringing their head-to-head record to 7–5 in their favor and claiming their tenth title of the season.

In the men's category, the number 6 pair surprisingly reached the final, where they faced the number 1 seeds in the decisive match. In the final, Coki Nieto and Jon Sanz pulled off a surprise victory, ending the historic winning streak of Agustín Tapia and Arturo Coello to claim the season's final title.

== Relevant Data ==
=== Pairs 'Last Dance' ===
Despite all their success and finishing the year as the world number two pair, Claudia Fernández and Gemma Triay decided to part ways, as did the number three pair, Bea González and Delfina Brea. Gemma and Delfi Brea joined forces for the following season, while Claudia played with Bea.

Similarly, in the men's category, Juan Lebrón played Martin Di Nenno former partner, Franco Stupaczuk, while Di Nenno teamed with Javi Garrido. Meanwhile Mike Yanguas paired with Coki Nieto.

=== First trophy-less season for Paquito ===
With the quarterfinal defeat of Paquito Navarro and Pablo Cardona against Agustín Tapia and Aruro Coello, Navarro's ten-year streak of winning at least one tournament came to an end. And despite losing in the final, Coello and Tapia set a new record by reaching 15 consecutive finals.

== Seeds ==
Male

Rnk.	Team
1	(Argentina) Agustín Tapia (Spain) Arturo Coello
2	(Spain) Alejandro Galán (Argentina) Federico Chingotto
3	(Argentina) Franco Stupaczuk (Spain) Miguel Yanguas
4	(Spain) Juan Lebrón (Argentina) Martin Di Nenno
5	(Spain) Coki Nieto (Spain) Jon Sanz
6	(Spain) Eduardo Alonso (Spain) Momo Gonzalez
7	(Spain) Pablo Cardona (Spain) Paquito Navarro
8	(Spain) Javi Garrido (Brazil) Lucas Bergamini

Female

Rnk.	Team
1	(Spain) Ariana Sánchez (Spain) Paula Josemaria
2	(Spain) Claudia Fernandez (Spain) Gemma Triay
3	(Argentina) Delfina Brea (Spain) Veronica Virseda
4	(Spain) Marta Ortega (Portugal) Sofia Araújo
5	(Spain) Alejandra Salazar (Spain) Jessica Castello
6	(Spain) Lucia Sainz (Spain) Patricia Llaguno
7	(Argentina) Claudia Jensen (Spain) Tamara Icardo
8	(Spain) Andrea Ustero (Spain) Alejandra Alonso

== Head-to-head record between teams ranked in the top 4 during the season ==
=== Man's ===
Record	Coello–Tapia	Galán–Chingotto	Lebrón–Di Nenno	Stupaczuk–Yanguas	Former Pairs	Galán–Lebrón	Paquito–Sanyo	Lebrón–Paquito	Di Nenno–Stupaczuk
Coello–Tapia	—	10–5	5–0	3–0		1–1	2–0	4–0	1–0
Galán–Chingotto	5–10	—	2–0	2–2		—	—	1–0	7–0
Lebrón–Di Nenno	0–5	0–2	—	—		—	—	—	—
Stupaczuk–Yanguas	0–3	2–2	—	—		—	—	—	—
Former Pairs									
Galán–Lebrón	1–1	—	—	—		—	—	—	2–0
Paquito–Sanyo	0–2	—	—	—		—	—	—	—
Lebrón–Paquito	0–4	0–1	—	—		—	—	—	0–1
Di Nenno–Stupaczuk	0–1	0–7	—	—		0–2	—	1–0	—

=== Women's ===
Record	Ariana–Paula	Fernandez–Triay	Gonzalez–D. Brea	Araújo–Ortega	Former Pairs	Icardo–Salazar	Ortega–Triay	Ortega–Virseda
Ariana–Paula	—	7–5	3–1	3–2		1–0	—	1–0
Fernandez–Triay	5–7	—	5–3	1–0		0–1	—	1–0
B. Gonzalez–D. Brea	1–3	3–5	—	2–0		3–0	—	—
Araújo–Ortega	2–3	0–1	0–2	—		—	—	—
Former Pairs								
Icardo–Salazar	0–1	1–0	0–3	—		—	—	—
Ortega–Triay	—	—	—	—		—	—	—
Ortega–Virseda	0–1	0–1	—	—		—	—	—

Matchups involving Andrea Ustero and Delfina Brea, and subsequently Delfina Brea and Lucia Sainz, are not included, as these were merely temporary pairings that lasted for a total of three tournaments while Bea González was recovering from an injury.

== Draws ==
=== Men's Bracket ===
Quarter-Final
1	(Spain) Coello / (Argentina) Tapia	7	6
7	(Spain) Paquito / (Spain) P. Cardona	6	2
8	(Spain) J. Garrido / (Brazil) L. Bergamini	4	3
4	(Argentina) Di Nenno / (Spain) Lebrón	6	6
3	(Argentina) Stupaczuk / (Spain) Yanguas	7	3	4
5	(Spain) Coki / (Spain) J. Sanz	6	6	6
6	(Spain) E. Alonso / (Spain) Momo	6	4	6
2	(Spain) Galán / (Argentina) Chingotto	4	6	4

Semi-Finals
1	(Spain) Coello / (Argentina) Tapia	6	6
4	(Argentina) Di Nenno / (Spain) Lebrón	3	3
5	(Spain) Coki / (Spain) J. Sanz	6	7
6	(Spain) E. Alonso / (Spain) Momo	3	5

Finals
1	(Spain) Coello / (Argentina) Tapia	6	5	3
5	(Spain) Coki / (Spain) J. Sanz	3	7	6

=== Women's Bracket ===
Quarter-Final
1	(Spain) A. Sanchez / (Spain) P. Josemaria	6	7
6	(Spain) L. Sainz / (Spain) P. Llaguno	3	5
5	(Spain) A. Salazar / (Spain) J. Castello	3	6	6
4	(Spain) M. Ortega / (Portugal) S. Araújo	6	4	2
3	(Argentina) D. Brea / (Spain) V. Virseda	2	6	6
8	(Spain) A. Alonso / (Spain) A. Ustero	6	1	4
7	(Argentina) C. Jensen / (Spain) T. Icardo	2	6	5
2	(Spain) C. Fernandez / (Spain) G. Triay	6	4	7

Semi-Finals
1	(Spain) A. Sanchez / (Spain) P. Josemaria	6	6
5	(Spain) A. Salazar / (Spain) J. Castello	4	3
3	(Argentina) D. Brea / (Spain) V. Virseda	5	1
2	(Spain) C. Fernandez / (Spain) G. Triay	7	6

Finals
1	(Spain) A. Sanchez / (Spain) P. Josemaria	6	6
2	(Spain) C. Fernandez / (Spain) G. Triay	3	3

== Results ==
=== Quarter-Finals ===
Men's

Date	Winners	Score	Opponent	Refs.
19/12/2024	(Argentina) Agustín Tapia (Spain) Arturo Coello	7–6 / 6–2	(Spain) Pablo Cardona (Spain) Paquito Navarro	
19/12/2024	(Spain) Juan Lebrón (Argentina) Martin Di Nenno	6–4 / 6–3	(Spain) Javi Garrido (Brazil) Lucas Bergamini	
20/12/2024	(Spain) Coki Nieto (Spain) Jon Sanz	6–7 / 6–3 / 6–4	(Argentina) Franco Stupaczuk (Spain) Mike Yanguas	
20/12/2024	(Spain) Eduardo Alonso (Spain) Momo Gonzalez	6–4 / 4–6 / 6–4	(Spain) Alejandro Galán (Argentina) Federico Chingotto	

Women's

Date	Winners	Score	Opponent	Refs.
19/12/2024	(Spain) Ariana Sanchez (Spain) Paula Josemaría	6–3 / 7–5	(Spain) Lucia Sainz (Spain) Patricia Llaguno	
19/12/2024	(Spain) Alejandra Salazar (Spain) Jessica Castelló	3–6 / 6–4 / 6–2	(Spain) Marta Ortega (Portugal) Sofia Araújo	
20/12/2024	(Argentina) Delfina Brea (Spain) Verónica Virseda	2–6 / 6–1 / 6–4	(Spain) Alejandra Alonso (Spain) Andrea Ustero	
20/12/2024	(Spain) Claudia Fernandéz; Gemma Triay	6–2 / 4–6 / 7–5	(Argentina) Claudia Jensen (Spain) Tamara Icardo	

=== Semi-Finals ===
Men's

Date	Winners	Score	Opponent	Refs.
21/12/2024	(Argentina) Agustín Tapia (Spain) Arturo Coello	6–3 / 6–3	(Spain) Juan Lebrón (Argentina) Martin Di Nenno	
21/12/2024	(Spain) Coki Nieto (Spain) Jon Sanz	6–3 / 7–5	(Spain) Eduardo Alonso (Spain) Momo Gonzalez	

Women's

Date	Winners	Score	Opponent	Refs.
21/12/2024	(Spain) Ariana Sanchez (Spain) Paula Josemaría	6–4 / 6–3	(Spain) Alejandra Salazar (Spain) Jessica Castelló	
21/12/2024	(Spain) Claudia Fernandéz; Gemma Triay	7–5 / 6–1	(Argentina) Delfina Brea (Spain) Verónica Virseda	

=== Final 3rd place ===
Men's

Date	Winners	Score	Opponent	Refs.
22/12/2024	(Spain) Juan Lebrón (Argentina) Martin Di Nenno	4–6 / 6–1 / 6–4	(Spain) Eduardo Alonso (Spain) Momo Gonzalez	

Women's

Date	Winners	Score	Opponent	Refs.
22/12/2024	(Argentina) Delfina Brea (Spain) Verónica Virseda	6–3 / 6–0	(Spain) Alejandra Salazar (Spain) Jessica Castelló	

=== Finals ===
Men's

Date	Winners	Score	Opponent	Refs.
22/12/2024	(Spain) Coki Nieto (Spain) Jon Sanz	3–6 / 7–5 / 6–3	(Argentina) Agustín Tapia (Spain) Arturo Coello	

Women's

Date	Winners	Score	Opponent	Refs.
22/12/2024	(Spain) Ariana Sanchez (Spain) Paula Josemaría	6–3 / 6–3	(Spain) Claudia Fernandéz; Gemma Triay	
