= 2026 London P1 =

Premier Padel tournament held in London

- Date: 2 – 9 August
- Edition: 1st
- Category: P1
- Prize money: €479.068
- Location: (United Kingdom) England, London
- Venue: Olympia London
- Court speed: Medium

Champions
- Men's doubles: (Argentina) Agustín Tapia (Spain) Arturo Coello
- Women's doubles: (Spain) Claudia Fernández (Spain) Martina Calvo

Chronology

The 2026 London P1 (officially 2026 Premier Padel London P1) was the fifteenth tournament of the fifth season organized by Premier Padel, the premier padel circuit, promoted by the International Padel Federation, and with the financial backing of Nasser Al-Khelaïfi's Qatar Sports Investments.

In the women's category, the pairs ranked number 1 and 4 by the FIP both reached the final for the second consecutive tournament. In the title match, Claudia Fernández and Martina Calvo defeated the world number ones, Delfina Brea and Gemma Triay, claiming their first title as a team and becoming the first women's pair to win a title on British soil.

In the men's category, the top two pairs in the FIP rankings both reached the final for the tenth time this season. In the championship match, Agustín Tapia and Arturo Coello defeated Alejandro Galán and Federico Chingotto in three sets, claiming their eighth title of 2026 and becoming the first men's pair to win a title on British soil.

== Relevant Data ==
=== Extended domain ===
By winning the London P1, Agustín Tapia and Arturo Coello extended their lead over their main pursuers and improved their head-to-head record against Alejandro Galán and Federico Chingotto to 6–4 this season (26–13 overall). This triumph also allowed the "Golden Boys" to head into the break with more titles won than all the other pairs combined.

=== Martina Calvo becomes youngest winner ===
Claudia Fernández and Martina Calvo secured their first title together in London. Furthermore, Calvo set a record by becoming the youngest athlete to win a professional padel tournament, at just 18 years, 1 month, and 4 days old, surpassing the record set just over a year ago by Andrea Ustero at the Bordeaux P2, where she won at 18 years, 1 month, and 24 days old. Having played only two tournaments together, the Spanish duo became the youngest winning team of all time.

== Seeds ==
Male

Rnk.	Team	FIP Ranking Points
1	(Argentina) Agustín Tapia (Spain) Arturo Coello	42532
2	(Spain) Alejandro Galán (Argentina) Federico Chingotto	34702
3	(Spain) Juan Lebrón (Argentina) Leandro Augsburguer	15691
4	(Argentina) Franco Stupaczuk (Spain) Mike Yanguas	13543
5	(Argentina) Martín Di Nenno (Spain) Paquito Navarro	10884
6	(Spain) Coki Nieto (Spain) Jon Sanz	10589
7	(Spain) Francisco Guerrero (Spain) Javi Leal	7864
8	(Brazil) Lucas Campagnolo (Spain) Momo González	7597
9	(Spain) Javier Garrido (Brazil) Lucas Bergamini	6579
10	(Argentina) Juan Tello (Argentina) Maximiliano Arce	5311
11	(Spain) Aimar Goñi (Spain) Eduardo Alonso	5128
12	(Spain) Alejandro Ruiz (Spain) Javier Garcia Mora	5029
13	(Spain) Juanlu Esbri (Argentina) Sanyo Gutiérrez	4353
14	(Argentina) Alex Chozas (Spain) Javier Barahona	4329
15	(United Arab Emirates) Inigo Jofre (Spain) Jairo Bautista	4294
16	(Spain) Alejandro Arroyo (Spain) Jose Jimenez Casas	4269

Female

Rnk.	Team	FIP Ranking Points
1	(Argentina) Delfina Brea (Spain) Gemma Triay	36372
2	(Spain) Bea González (Spain) Paula Josemaria	28674
3	(Spain) Ariana Sánchez (Spain) Andrea Ustero	22447
4	(Spain) Claudia Fernandéz (Spain) Martina Calvo	15769
5	(Spain) Marta Ortega (Portugal) Sofia Araújo	12922
6	(Argentina) Claudia Jensen (Spain) Tamara Icardo	12207
7	(Spain) Alejandra Alonso (Spain) Marina Guinart	8952
8	(Spain) Alejandra Salazar (Argentina) Aranzazu Osoro	7586
9	(Spain) Jimena Velasco (Spain) Veronica Virseda	6571
10	(Spain) Beatriz Caldera (Spain) Carmen Goenaga	6432
11	(Spain) Lorena Rufo (Spain) Victoria Iglesias	5229
12	(Argentina) Martina Fassio Goyeneche (Spain) Raquel Eugenio Barrera	5156
13	(Italy) Carolina Orsi (Spain) Patricia Llaguno	4847
14	(Italy) Giulia Dal Pozzo (Spain) Nuria Rodriguez	4551
15	(Spain) Lucía Sainz (Spain) Sofia Saiz	3934
16	(Spain) Jessica Castelló (Spain) Marta Talavan	3719

== Head-to-head record between teams ranked in the top 4 during the season ==
=== Men's ===
Record	Coello–Tapia	Galán–Chingotto	Augsburger–Lebrón	Stupaczuk–Yanguas
Coello–Tapia	—	6–4	6–1	5–0
Galán–Chingotto	4–6	—	4–2	3–0
Augsburger–Lebrón	1–6	2–4	—	—
Stupaczuk–Yanguas	0–5	0–3	—	—

=== Women's ===
Record	D. Brea–Triay	B. González–Paula	Ariana–Ustero	C. Fernández–M. Calvo	Former Pairs	Araúijo–C. Fernández
D. Brea–Triay	—	2–5	5–3	1–1		3–0
B. González–Paula	5–2	—	4–3	0–2		2–0
Ariana–Ustero	3–5	3–4	—	—		1–0
C. Fernández–M. Calvo	1–1	2–0	—	—		—
Former Pairs
Araúijo–C. Fernández	0–3	0–2	0–1	—		—

== Draws ==
=== Men's Bracket ===
Round of 32
1	(Spain) Coello / (Argentina) Tapia	6	6
30	(Portugal) M. Deus / (Portugal) N. Deus	2	4
35	(Italy) D. Perino / (Italy) F. Dominguez	6	5	3
16	(Spain) A. Arroyo / (Spain) J.J. Casas	1	7	6
9	(Spain) J. Garrido / (Brazil) L. Bergamini	6	4	1
31	(Argentina) I. Piotto / (Argentina) J.C. Belluati	3	6	6
33	(Spain) F. Cabeza / (Paraguay) M. San Martin	6	4	7
7	(Spain) F. Guerrero / (Spain) J. Leal	3	6	5
5	(Argentina) Di Nenno / (Spain) Paquito	6	6
32	(Spain) J. Ruiz / (Spain) S. Pineda	4	1
20	(Spain) D.G. Sánchez / (Italy) E. Jensen	6	6
14	(Argentina) A. Chozas / (Spain) J. Barahona	3	1
11	(Spain) A. Goñi / (Spain) E. Alonso	2	6	7
21	(Spain) D. Santigosa / (Argentina) M.S. Blasco	6	3	6
Q	(Spain) J. Marmolejo / (Argentina) R. Pereyra	6	6	6
4	(Argentina) F. Stupaczuk / (Spain) M. Yanguas	7	4	1
3	(Spain) Lebrón / (Argentina) L. Augsburger	6	6
Q	(Belgium) C. Geens / (France) T. Leygue	2	2
WC	(Spain) A. Jimenez / (United Kingdom) C. Murphy	2	1
10	(Argentina) J. Tello / (Argentina) M. Arce	6	6
15	(United Arab Emirates) I. Jofre / (Spain) J. Bautista	6	6
Q	(Argentina) F. Mouriño / (Spain) M. Quilez	3	3
Q	(Spain) D. Garcia / (Spain) R. Coello	2	2
6	(Spain) Coki / (Spain) J. Sanz	6	6
8	(Brazil) L. Campagnolo / (Spain) Momo	6	5	6
23	(Spain) F. Gil / (Spain) P. Lijó	3	7	4
28	(Argentina) L. Capra / (Spain) L.H. Quesada	4	4
13	(Spain) J. Esbri / (Argentina) Sanyo	6	6
12	(Spain) Á. Ruiz / (Spain) J.G. Mora	6	4	6
19	(Argentina) G. Alfonso / (Argentina) V. Libaak	4	6	4
36	(Italy) A. Montiel / (Italy) F. Abbate	3	7	2
2	(Argentina) Chingotto / (Spain) Galán	6	6	6

Round of 16
1	(Spain) Coello / (Argentina) Tapia	7	6
16	(Spain) A. Arroyo / (Spain) J.J. Casas	6	4
31	(Argentina) I. Piotto / (Argentina) J.C. Belluati	3	6	4
33	(Spain) F. Cabeza / (Paraguay) M. San Martin	6	3	6
5	(Argentina) Di Nenno / (Spain) Paquito	6	6
20	(Spain) D.G. Sánchez / (Italy) E. Jensen	4	2
11	(Spain) A. Goñi / (Spain) E. Alonso	6	6
Q	(Spain) J. Marmolejo / (Argentina) R. Pereyra	2	3
3	(Spain) Lebrón / (Argentina) L. Augsburger	3	7	6
10	(Argentina) J. Tello / (Argentina) M. Arce	6	6	2
15	(United Arab Emirates) I. Jofre / (Spain) J. Bautista	5	2
6	(Spain) Coki / (Spain) J. Sanz	7	6
8	(Brazil) L. Campagnolo / (Spain) Momo	6	6
13	(Spain) J. Esbri / (Argentina) Sanyo	4	2
12	(Spain) Á. Ruiz / (Spain) J.G. Mora	3	3
2	(Argentina) Chingotto / (Spain) Galán	6	6

Quarter-Final
1	(Spain) Coello / (Argentina) Tapia	6	6
33	(Spain) F. Cabeza / (Paraguay) M. San Martin	1	2
5	(Argentina) Di Nenno / (Spain) Paquito	7	6	6
11	(Spain) A. Goñi / (Spain) E. Alonso	5	7	3
3	(Spain) Lebrón / (Argentina) L. Augsburger	6	2	6
6	(Spain) Coki / (Spain) J. Sanz	3	6	3
8	(Brazil) L. Campagnolo / (Spain) Momo	1	0
2	(Argentina) Chingotto / (Spain) Galán	6	6

Semi-Finals
1	(Spain) Coello / (Argentina) Tapia	6	6
5	(Argentina) Di Nenno / (Spain) Paquito	3	2
3	(Spain) Lebrón / (Argentina) L. Augsburger	6	3
2	(Argentina) Chingotto / (Spain) Galán	7	6

Finals
1	(Spain) Coello / (Argentina) Tapia	6	5	7
2	(Argentina) Chingotto / (Spain) Galán	3	7	5

=== Women's Bracket ===
Round of 32
1	(Argentina) D. Brea / (Spain) G. Triay
Bye
Q	(Italy) G. Marchetti / (Spain) L. Arruabarrena	6	2
11	(Spain) L. Rufo / (Spain) V. Iglesias	7	6
13	(Italy) C. Orsi / (Spain) P. Llaguno	1	0
18	(Spain) J. Montes / (Spain) M. Barrera	6	6
14	(Italy) G. Dal Pozzo / (Spain) N. Rodriguez	3	2
5	(Spain) M. Ortega / (Portugal) S. Araújo	6	6
8	(Spain) A. Salazar / (Argentina) A. Osoro	1	1
10	(Spain) B. Caldera / (Spain) C. Goenaga	6	6
Q	(Spain) L. Manquillo / (Spain) N. Aguilar	7	6
17	(Spain) M.R. Abajo / (Spain) N. Canovas	6	2
15	(Spain) L. Sainz / (Spain) S. Saiz	4	4
12	(Argentina) M. Goyeneche / (Spain) R. Barrera	6	6
Bye
3	(Spain) A. Ustero / (Spain) A. Sánchez
4	(Spain) C. Fernández / (Spain) M. Calvo
Bye
19	(France) A. Collombon / (Russia) K. Sharifova	6	7
WC	(United Kingdom) A. Gibson / (United Kingdom) C. Rose	1	6
9	(Spain) J. Velasco / (Spain) V. Virseda	2	6	6
Q	(Spain) C. Escacena / (Spain) P. Martinez	6	1	2
Q	(Spain) A. Cañellas / (Spain) A. Moral	4	0
6	(Argentina) C. Jensen / (Spain) T. Icardo	6	6
7	(Spain) A. Alonso / (Spain) M. Guinart	5	6	6
20	(Spain) A. Martinez / (Spain) L. Luján	7	1	4
16	(Spain) J. Castelló / (Spain) M. Talavan	1	6	6
23	(Spain) T. Navarro / (Argentina) V. Riera	6	1	2
21	(Spain) A. Perez / (Spain) L. Martinez	6	7
22	(Argentina) J. Bidahorria / (Spain) M. Caparros	3	5
Bye
2	(Spain) B. González / (Spain) P. Josemaria

Round of 16
1	(Argentina) D. Brea / (Spain) G. Triay	3	6	6
11	(Spain) L. Rufo / (Spain) V. Iglesias	6	2	2
18	(Spain) J. Montes / (Spain) M. Barrera	3	1
5	(Spain) M. Ortega / (Portugal) S. Araújo	6	6
10	(Spain) B. Caldera / (Spain) C. Goenaga	6	6
Q	(Spain) L. Manquillo / (Spain) N. Aguilar	3	0
12	(Argentina) M. Goyeneche / (Spain) R. Barrera	4	4
3	(Spain) A. Ustero / (Spain) A. Sánchez	6	6
4	(Spain) C. Fernández / (Spain) M. Calvo	6	6
19	(France) A. Collombon / (Russia) K. Sharifova	1	2
9	(Spain) J. Velasco / (Spain) V. Virseda	2	2
6	(Argentina) C. Jensen / (Spain) T. Icardo	6	6
7	(Spain) A. Alonso / (Spain) M. Guinart	5	1
16	(Spain) J. Castelló / (Spain) M. Talavan	7	6
21	(Spain) A. Perez / (Spain) L. Martinez	5	1
2	(Spain) B. González / (Spain) P. Josemaria	7	6

Quarter-Final
1	(Argentina) D. Brea / (Spain) G. Triay	7	4	6
5	(Spain) M. Ortega / (Portugal) S. Araújo	5	6	1
10	(Spain) B. Caldera / (Spain) C. Goenaga	6	4
3	(Spain) A. Ustero / (Spain) A. Sánchez	7	6
4	(Spain) C. Fernández / (Spain) M. Calvo	6	6
6	(Argentina) C. Jensen / (Spain) T. Icardo	3	4
16	(Spain) J. Castelló / (Spain) M. Talavan	2	6	0
2	(Spain) B. González / (Spain) P. Josemaria	6	3	6

Semi-Finals
1	(Argentina) D. Brea / (Spain) G. Triay	7	5	6
3	(Spain) A. Ustero / (Spain) A. Sánchez	6	7	3
4	(Spain) C. Fernández / (Spain) M. Calvo	6	6
2	(Spain) B. González / (Spain) P. Josemaria	2	4

Finals
1	(Argentina) D. Brea / (Spain) G. Triay	5	3
4	(Spain) C. Fernández / (Spain) M. Calvo	7	6

== Results ==
=== First Round ===
Men's

Date	Winners	Score	Opponent	Refs.
4/8/2026	(Portugal) Miguel Deus (Portugal) Nuno Deus	5–7 / 6–3 / 6–4	(United Arab Emirates) Ignacio Vilariño (Spain) Juan Zamora	
4/8/2026	(Italy) Denis Perino (Italy) Facundo Dominguez	7–5 / 6–7 / 6–4	(Spain) Javier Martinez (Argentina) Ramiro Jesus Valenzuela	
4/8/2026	(Argentina) Ignacio Piotto (Spain) Juan Cruz Belluati	6–2 / 6–4	(United Kingdom) Alfonso Patacho (United Kingdom) Chris Salisbury	
4/8/2026	(Spain) Francisco Cabeza (Paraguay) Mariano Gonzalez San Martin	7–6 / 7–5	(Spain) Mario Ortega (Spain) Victor Ruiz	
4/8/2026	(Spain) Javier Ruiz (Spain) Santiago Pineda	6–3 / 6–2	(United Arab Emirates) Francisco Sosa (United Kingdom) Louie Harris	
4/8/2026	(Spain) David Gala Sánchez (Italy) Enzo Jensen	6–2 / 6–4	(Argentina) Leonel Aguirre (Spain) Pablo Garcia Rodrigo	
4/8/2026	(Spain) Daniel Santigosa (Argentina) Maximiliano Sánchez Blasco	7–6 / 6–1	(Spain) Jose Garcia Diestro (Spain) Marc Sintes	
4/8/2026	(Spain) Jose Solano Marmolejo (Argentina) Ramiro Pereyra	7–6 / 6–4	(Spain) Enrique Goenaga (Spain) Manuel Castaño	
4/8/2026	(Belgium) Clement Geens (France) Thomas Leygue	3–6 / 6–3 / 6–4	(Spain) Álvaro Cepero (Argentina) Eduardo Agustin Torre	
4/8/2026	(Spain) Alberto Garcia Jimenez (United Kingdom) Christian Medina Murphy	6–2 / 6–2	(Argentina) Agustín Gutiérrez (Italy) Santino Giuliani Lombardo	
4/8/2026	(Argentina) Federico Mourino (Spain) Marc Quilez	7–6 / 6–0	(Spain) Albert Roglan Pons (Spain) Manuel Aragon Herrera	
4/8/2026	(Spain) Diego Garcia Garcia (Spain) Rodrigo Coello	6–7 / 6–0 / 6–4	(Spain) Guillermo Collado (Spain) Pol Hernandez Alvarez	
4/8/2026	(Spain) Francisco Manuel Gil (Spain) Pablo Lijó	6–3 / 6–4	(Spain) Alonso Rodriguez Martinez (Argentina) Juan De Pascual	
4/8/2026	(Argentina) Luciano Capra (Spain) Luis Hernandez Quesada	7–6 / 6–4	(Spain) Adrian Naranjo (Spain) Teodoro Zapata	
4/8/2026	(Argentina) Gonzalo Alfonso (Argentina) Valentino Libaak	6–2 / 6–2	(Spain) Andres Fernández Lancha (Spain) Gonzalo Rubio	
4/8/2026	(Italy) Alvaro Montiel Caruso (Italy) Flavio Abbate	4–6 / 7–5 / 6–2	(Argentina) Juan Rubini (Argentina) Maxi Sánchez	

=== Round of 32 ===
Men's

Date	Winners	Score	Opponent	Refs.
5/8/2026	(Argentina) Agustín Tapia (Spain) Arturo Coello	6–2 / 6–4	(Portugal) Miguel Deus (Portugal) Nuno Deus	
5/8/2026	(Spain) Alex Arroyo (Spain) Jose Jimenez Casas	1–6 / 7–5 / 6–3	(Italy) Denis Perino (Italy) Facundo Dominguez	
5/8/2026	(Argentina) Ignacio Piotto (Spain) Juan Cruz Belluati	3–6 / 6–4 / 6–1	(Spain) Javier Garrido (Brazil) Lucas Bergamini	
5/8/2026	(Spain) Francisco Cabeza (Paraguay) Mariano Gonzalez San Martin	6–3 / 4–6 / 7–5	(Spain) Francisco Guerrero (Spain) Javi Leal	
5/8/2026	(Argentina) Martin Di Nenno (Spain) Paquito Navarro	6–4 / 6–1	(Spain) Javier Ruiz (Spain) Santiago Pineda	
5/8/2026	(Spain) David Gala Sánchez (Italy) Enzo Jensen	6–3 / 6–1	(Argentina) Alex Chozas (Spain) Javier Barahona	
5/8/2026	(Spain) Aimar Goñi (Spain) Eduardo Alonso	2–6 / 6–3 / 7–6	(Spain) Daniel Santigosa (Argentina) Maximiliano Sánchez Blasco	
5/8/2026	(Spain) Jose Solano Marmolejo (Argentina) Ramiro Pereyra	6–7 / 6–4 / 6–1	(Argentina) Franco Stupaczuk (Spain) Miguel Yanguas	
5/8/2026	(Spain) Juan Lebrón (Argentina) Leandro Augsburger	6–2 / 6–2	(Belgium) Clement Geens (France) Thomas Leygue	
5/8/2026	(Argentina) Juan Tello (Argentina) Maximiliano Arce	6–2 / 6–1	(Spain) Alberto Garcia Jimenez (United Kingdom) Christian Medina Murphy	
5/8/2026	(United Arab Emirates) Inigo Jofre (Spain) Jairo Bautista	6–3 / 6–3	(Argentina) Federico Mourino (Spain) Marc Quilez	
5/8/2026	(Spain) Coki Nieto (Spain) Jon Sanz	6–2 / 6–2	(Spain) Diego Garcia Garcia (Spain) Rodrigo Coello	
5/8/2026	(Brazil) Lucas Campagnolo (Spain) Momo González	6–3 / 5–7 / 6–4	(Spain) Francisco Manuel Gil (Spain) Pablo Lijó	
5/8/2026	(Spain) Juanlu Esbri (Argentina) Sanyo Gutiérrez	6–4 / 6–4	(Argentina) Luciano Capra (Spain) Luis Hernandez Quesada	
5/8/2026	(Spain) Aléx Ruiz (Spain) Javier Garcia Mora	6–4 / 4–6 / 6–4	(Argentina) Gonzalo Alfonso (Argentina) Valentino Libaak	
5/8/2026	(Spain) Alejandro Galán (Argentina) Federico Chingotto	6–3 / 6–7 / 6–2	(Italy) Alvaro Montiel Caruso (Italy) Flavio Abbate	

Women's

Date	Winners	Score	Opponent	Refs.
5/8/2026	(Spain) Lorena Rufo (Spain) Victoria Iglesias	7–6 / 6–2	(Italy) Giorgia Marchetti (Spain) Lara Arruabarrena	
5/8/2026	(Spain) Jana Montes (Spain) Marta Barrera	6–1 / 6–0	(Italy) Carolina Orsi (Spain) Patricia Llaguno	
5/8/2026	(Spain) Marta Ortega (Portugal) Sofia Araújo	6–3 / 6–2	(Italy) Giulia Dal Pozzo (Spain) Nuria Rodriguez	
5/8/2026	(Spain) Beatriz Caldera (Spain) Carmen Goenaga	6–1 / 6–1	(Spain) Alejandra Salazar (Argentina) Aranzazu Osoro	
5/8/2026	(Spain) Letizia Manquillo (Spain) Noemi Aguilar	7–6 / 6–2	(Spain) Maria Rodriguez Abajo (Spain) Noa Canovas	
5/8/2026	(Argentina) Martina Fassio Goyeneche (Spain) Raquel Eugenio Barrera	6–4 / 6–4	(Spain) Lucía Sainz (Spain) Sofia Saiz	
4/8/2026	(France) Alix Collombon (Russia) Ksenia Sharifova	6–1 / 7–6	(United Kingdom) Aimee Gibson (United Kingdom) Catherine Rose	
5/8/2026	(Spain) Jimena Velasco (Spain) Veronica Virseda	2–6 / 6–1 / 6–2	(Spain) Claudia Escacena (Spain) Patricia Fortun	
5/8/2026	(Argentina) Claudia Jensen (Spain) Tamara Icardo	6–4 / 6–0	(Spain) Amanda Lopez Moral (Spain) Ariadna Cañellas	
4/8/2026	(Spain) Alejandra Alonso (Spain) Marina Guinart	5–7 / 6–1 / 6–4	(Spain) Araceli Martinez (Spain) Laura Luján	
4/8/2026	(Spain) Jessica Castelló (Spain) Marta Talavan	1–6 / 6–1 / 6–2	(Spain) Teresa Navarro (Argentina) Virginia Riera	
4/8/2026	(Spain) Agueda Perez (Spain) Lucia Martinez	6–3 / 7–5	(Argentina) Julieta Bidahorria (Spain) Marta Caparros	

=== Round of 16 ===
Men's

Date	Winners	Score	Opponent	Refs.
6/8/2026	(Argentina) Agustín Tapia (Spain) Arturo Coello	7–6 / 6–4	(Spain) Alex Arroyo (Spain) Jose Jimenez Casas	
6/8/2026	(Spain) Francisco Cabeza (Paraguay) Mariano Gonzalez San Martin	6–3 / 3–6 / 6–4	(Argentina) Ignacio Piotto (Spain) Juan Cruz Belluati	
6/8/2026	(Argentina) Martin Di Nenno (Spain) Paquito Navarro	6–4 / 6–2	(Spain) David Gala Sánchez (Italy) Enzo Jensen	
6/8/2026	(Spain) Aimar Goñi (Spain) Eduardo Alonso	6–2 / 6–3	(Spain) Jose Solano Marmolejo (Argentina) Ramiro Pereyra	
6/8/2026	(Spain) Juan Lebrón (Argentina) Leandro Augsburger	3–6 / 7–6 / 6–2	(Argentina) Juan Tello (Argentina) Maximiliano Arce	
6/8/2026	(Spain) Coki Nieto (Spain) Jon Sanz	7–5 / 6–2	(United Arab Emirates) Inigo Jofre (Spain) Jairo Bautista	
6/8/2026	(Brazil) Lucas Campagnolo (Spain) Momo González	6–4 / 6–2	(Spain) Juanlu Esbri (Argentina) Sanyo Gutiérrez	
6/8/2026	(Spain) Alejandro Galán (Argentina) Federico Chingotto	6–3 / 6–3	(Spain) Aléx Ruiz (Spain) Javier Garcia Mora	

Women's

Date	Winners	Score	Opponent	Refs.
6/8/2026	(Argentina) Delfina Brea (Spain) Gemma Triay	3–6 / 6–2 / 6–2	(Spain) Lorena Rufo (Spain) Victoria Iglesias	
6/8/2026	(Spain) Marta Ortega (Portugal) Sofia Araújo	6–3 / 6–1	(Spain) Jana Montes (Spain) Marta Barrera	
6/8/2026	(Spain) Beatriz Caldera (Spain) Carmen Goenaga	6–3 / 6–0	(Spain) Letizia Manquillo (Spain) Noemi Aguilar	
6/8/2026	(Spain) Andrea Ustero (Spain) Ariana Sánchez	6–4 / 6–4	(Argentina) Martina Fassio Goyeneche (Spain) Raquel Eugenio Barrera	
6/8/2026	(Spain) Claudia Fernández (Spain) Martina Calvo	6–1 / 6–2	(France) Alix Collombon (Russia) Ksenia Sharifova	
6/8/2026	(Argentina) Claudia Jensen (Spain) Tamara Icardo	6–2 / 6–2	(Spain) Jimena Velasco (Spain) Veronica Virseda	
6/8/2026	(Spain) Jessica Castelló (Spain) Marta Talavan	7–5 / 6–1	(Spain) Alejandra Alonso (Spain) Marina Guinart	
6/8/2026	(Spain) Bea González (Spain) Paula Josemaría	7–5 / 6–1	(Spain) Agueda Perez (Spain) Lucia Martinez	

=== Quarter-Finals ===
Men's

Date	Winners	Score	Opponent	Refs.
7/8/2026	(Argentina) Agustín Tapia (Spain) Arturo Coello	6–1 / 6–2	(Spain) Francisco Cabeza (Paraguay) Mariano Gonzalez San Martin	
7/8/2026	(Argentina) Martin Di Nenno (Spain) Paquito Navarro	7–5 / 6–7 / 6–3	(Spain) Aimar Goñi (Spain) Eduardo Alonso	
7/8/2026	(Spain) Juan Lebrón (Argentina) Leandro Augsburger	6–3 / 2–6 / 6–3	(Spain) Coki Nieto (Spain) Jon Sanz	
7/8/2026	(Spain) Alejandro Galán (Argentina) Federico Chingotto	6–1 / 6–0	(Brazil) Lucas Campagnolo (Spain) Momo González	

Women's

Date	Winners	Score	Opponent	Refs.
7/8/2026	(Argentina) Delfina Brea (Spain) Gemma Triay	7–5 / 4–6 / 6–1	(Spain) Marta Ortega (Portugal) Sofia Araújo	
7/8/2026	(Spain) Andrea Ustero (Spain) Ariana Sánchez	7–6 / 6–4	(Spain) Beatriz Caldera (Spain) Carmen Goenaga	
7/8/2026	(Spain) Claudia Fernández (Spain) Martina Calvo	6–3 / 6–4	(Argentina) Claudia Jensen (Spain) Tamara Icardo	
7/8/2026	(Spain) Bea González (Spain) Paula Josemaría	6–2 / 3–6 / 6–0	(Spain) Jessica Castelló (Spain) Marta Talavan	

=== Semi-Finals ===
Men's

Date	Winners	Score	Opponent	Refs.
8/8/2026	(Argentina) Agustín Tapia (Spain) Arturo Coello	6–3 / 6–2	(Argentina) Martin Di Nenno (Spain) Paquito Navarro	
8/8/2026	(Spain) Alejandro Galán (Argentina) Federico Chingotto	7–6 / 6–3	(Spain) Juan Lebrón (Argentina) Leandro Augsburger	

Women's

Date	Winners	Score	Opponent	Refs.
8/8/2026	(Argentina) Delfina Brea (Spain) Gemma Triay	7–6 / 5–7 / 6–3	(Spain) Andrea Ustero (Spain) Ariana Sánchez	
8/8/2026	(Spain) Claudia Fernández (Spain) Martina Calvo	6–2 / 6–4	(Spain) Bea González (Spain) Paula Josemaría	

=== Finals ===
Men's

Date	Winners	Score	Opponent	Refs.
9/8/2026	(Argentina) Agustín Tapia (Spain) Arturo Coello	6–3 / 5–7 / 7–5	(Spain) Alejandro Galán (Argentina) Federico Chingotto	

Women's

Date	Winners	Score	Opponent	Refs.
9/8/2026	(Spain) Claudia Fernández (Spain) Martina Calvo	7–5 / 6–3	(Argentina) Delfina Brea (Spain) Gemma Triay	
