= 2026 Gijón P2 =

Premier Padel tournament held in Gijón

- Date: 1 – 8 March
- Edition: 2nd
- Category: P2
- Prize money: €264.534
- Location: Gijón, Spain
- Venue: Palacio de Deportes de Gijón
- Court speed: Slow

Champions
- Men's doubles: (Spain) Alejandro Galán (Argentina) Federico Chingotto
- Women's doubles: (Argentina) Delfina Brea (Spain) Gemma Triay

Chronology

The 2026 Gijón P2 (officially 2026 Premier Padel Gijón P2) was the second tournament of the fifth season organized by Premier Padel, the premier padel circuit, promoted by the International Padel Federation, and with the financial backing of Nasser Al-Khelaïfi's Qatar Sports Investments.

In the women's category, the FIP's number 1 and number 3 ranked pairs met in the final, repeating the matchup from the previous tournament in Riyadh. In the title match, Delfina Brea and Gemma Triay avenged their loss to Andrea Ustero and Ariana Sánchez from the last tournament, securing their first title of the year.

In the men's category, the two top-ranked pairs faced each other for the second time in 2026, repeating the Riyadh final. This marked their eighth consecutive meeting across the current and previous seasons, and their thirtieth final against one another. In the title match, Alejandro Galán and Federico Chingotto defeated Agustín Tapia and Arturo Coello in two sets, claiming their first title of 2026.

== Seeds ==
Male

Rnk.	Team	FIP Ranking Points
1	(Argentina) Agustín Tapia (Spain) Arturo Coello	39600
2	(Spain) Alejandro Galán (Argentina) Federico Chingotto	35480
3	(Argentina) Franco Stupaczuk (Spain) Mike Yanguas	13627
4	(Spain) Juan Lebrón (Argentina) Leandro Augsburguer	12760
5	(Spain) Francisco Guerrero (Spain) Paquito Navarro	11320
6	(Spain) Coki Nieto (Spain) Jon Sanz	11042
7	(Argentina) Martín Di Nenno (Spain) Momo González	9370
8	(Brazil) Lucas Bergamini (Spain) Javi Garrido	7487
9	(Spain) Eduardo Alonso (Argentina) Juan Tello	6375
10	(Spain) Álvaro Cepero (Spain) Javi Leal	5200
11	(Spain) Alejandro Arroyo (Argentina) Leonel Aguirre	5167
12	(Argentina) Gonzalo Alfonso (Argentina) Sanyo Gutiérrez	4899
13	(Spain) Alejandro Ruiz (Spain) Juanlu Esbri	4805
14	(Spain) Jairo Bautista (Brazil) Lucas Campagnolo	4534
15	(Argentina) Alex Chozas (Argentina) Valentino Libaak	3685
16	(Spain) David Gala Sánchez (Spain) Pablo Garcia Rodrigo	3339

Female

Rnk.	Team	FIP Ranking Points
1	(Argentina) Delfina Brea (Spain) Gemma Triay	36600
2	(Spain) Bea González (Spain) Paula Josemaria	26520
3	(Spain) Ariana Sánchez (Spain) Andrea Ustero	22255
4	(Spain) Claudia Fernandéz (Portugal) Sofia Araújo	19830
5	(Argentina) Claudia Jensen (Spain) Tamara Icardo	11815
6	(Spain) Marta Ortega (Spain) Martina Calvo	11090
7	(Spain) Alejandra Alonso (Spain) Alejandra Salazar	10855
8	(Spain) Marina Guinart (Spain) Veronica Virseda	8245
9	(Spain) Beatriz Caldera (Spain) Carmen Goenaga	7210
10	(Spain) Lucia Sainz (Spain) Raquel Eugenio Barrera	5680
11	(Argentina) Martina Fassio Goyeneche (Spain) Patricia Llaguno	5290
12	(Spain) Jessica Castelló (Spain) Lorena Rufo	4670
13	(Spain) Jimena Velasco (Spain) Marta Barrera	4275
14	(Spain) Araceli Martinez (Italy) Carolina Orsi	3810
15	(Spain) Maria Rodriguez Abajo (Spain) Noa Canovas	3410
16	(Russia) Ksenia Sharifova (Spain) Marta Borrero	3282

== Head-to-head record between teams ranked in the top 4 during the season ==
=== Man's ===
Record	Coello–Tapia	Galán–Chingotto	Stupaczuk–Yanguas	Augsburger–Lebrón
Coello–Tapia	—	1–1	1–0	1–0
Galán–Chingotto	1–1	—	—	—
Stupaczuk–Yanguas	0–1	—	—	—
Augsburger–Lebrón	0–1	—	—	—

=== Women's ===
Record	D. Brea–Triay	B. González–Paula	Ariana–Ustero	Araúijo–C. Fernandez
D. Brea–Triay	—	—	1–1	1–0
B. González–Paula	—	—	0–2	—
Ariana–Ustero	1–1	2–0	—	—
Araúijo–C. Fernandez	0–1	—	—	—

== Draws ==
=== Men's Bracket ===
Round of 32
1	(Spain) Coello / (Argentina) Tapia
Bye
Q	(Argentina) M. Arce / (Spain) P. Lijó	6	6
WC	(Spain) A. Trabanco / (Argentina) M. Lamperti	1	4
LL	(Spain) D. Garcia / (Spain) S. Cabello	6	1
14	(Spain) J. Bautista / (Brazil) L. Campagnolo	7	6
Q	(Italy) E. Jensen / (Spain) L.H. Quesada	6	4	1
7	(Argentina) Di Nenno / (Spain) Momo	2	6	6
5	(Spain) F. Guerrero / (Spain) Paquito	6	4	4
9	(Spain) E. Alonso / (Argentina) J. Tello	4	6	6
12	(Argentina) G. Alfonso / (Argentina) Sanyo	3	3
Q	(Spain) J. Martinez / (Argentina) R. Valenzuela	6	6
22	(Spain) F. Gil / (Argentina) Maxi	3	6
17	(Spain) G. Collado / (Spain) P.H. Alvarez	6	7
Bye
3	(Argentina) Stupaczuk / (Spain) M. Yanguas
4	(Spain) Lebrón / (Argentina) L. Augsburger
Bye
11	(Spain) A. Arroyo / (Argentina) L. Aguirre	6	6
19	(Spain) A.F. Lancha / (Spain) J.G. Diestro	2	2
15	(Argentina) A. Chozas / (Argentina) V. Libaak	6	6
WC	(Spain) A.L. Campos / (Spain) F. Ramirez	0	2
13	(Spain) A. Ruiz / (Spain) J. Esbri	3	6	3
6	(Spain) Coki / (Spain) J. Sanz	6	4	6
8	(Spain) J. Garrido / (Brazil) L. Bergamini	3	7	6
18	(Spain) J.J. Casas / (Argentina) M. Blasco	6	5	4
20	(United Arab Emirates) I. Jofre / (Spain) M. Castaño	7	2	2
16	(Spain) D.G. Sánchez / (Spain) P.G. Rodrigo	6	6	6
Q	(Spain) A. Goñi / (Spain) E. Goenaga	7	6
21	(Spain) G. Rubio / (Spain) J. Ruiz	5	3
Bye
2	(Argentina) Chingotto / (Spain) Galán

Round of 16
1	(Spain) Coello / (Argentina) Tapia	6	6	6
Q	(Argentina) M. Arce / (Spain) P. Lijó	3	7	3
14	(Spain) J. Bautista / (Brazil) L. Campagnolo	3	1
7	(Argentina) Di Nenno / (Spain) Momo	6	6
9	(Spain) E. Alonso / (Argentina) J. Tello	6	6
Q	(Spain) J. Martinez / (Argentina) R. Valenzuela	1	2
17	(Spain) G. Collado / (Spain) P.H. Alvarez	2	2
3	(Argentina) Stupaczuk / (Spain) M. Yanguas	6	6
4	(Spain) Lebrón / (Argentina) L. Augsburger	6	6
11	(Spain) A. Arroyo / (Argentina) L. Aguirre	2	1
15	(Argentina) A. Chozas / (Argentina) V. Libaak	5	6	3
6	(Spain) Coki / (Spain) J. Sanz	7	3	6
8	(Spain) J. Garrido / (Brazil) L. Bergamini	6	6	6
16	(Spain) D.G. Sánchez / (Spain) P.G. Rodrigo	7	3	4
Q	(Spain) A. Goñi / (Spain) E. Goenaga	5	3
2	(Argentina) Chingotto / (Spain) Galán	7	6

Quarter-Final
1	(Spain) Coello / (Argentina) Tapia	6	6
7	(Argentina) Di Nenno / (Spain) Momo	3	1
9	(Spain) E. Alonso / (Argentina) J. Tello	4	2
3	(Argentina) Stupaczuk / (Spain) M. Yanguas	6	6
4	(Spain) Lebrón / (Argentina) L. Augsburger	5	6
6	(Spain) Coki / (Spain) J. Sanz	7	7
8	(Spain) J. Garrido / (Brazil) L. Bergamini	2	1
2	(Argentina) Chingotto / (Spain) Galán	6	6

Semi-Finals
1	(Spain) Coello / (Argentina) Tapia	7	6
3	(Argentina) Stupaczuk / (Spain) M. Yanguas	6	4
6	(Spain) Coki / (Spain) J. Sanz	6	3	4
2	(Argentina) Chingotto / (Spain) Galán	4	6	6

Finals
1	(Spain) Coello / (Argentina) Tapia	5	6
2	(Argentina) Chingotto / (Spain) Galán	7	7

=== Women's Bracket ===
Round of 32
1	(Argentina) D. Brea / (Spain) G. Triay
Bye
11	(Argentina) M. Goyeneche / (Spain) P. Llaguno	6	6	4
13	(Spain) M. Barrera / (Spain) J. Velasco	7	4	6
Q	(Spain) A. Gracia / (Italy) C. Casali	1	3
10	(Spain) L. Sainz / (Spain) R. Barrera	6	6
Bye
6	(Spain) M. Ortega / (Spain) M. Calvo
5	(Argentina) C. Jensen / (Spain) T. Icardo
Bye
Q	(Spain) M. Talavan / (Spain) S. Saiz	6	2
9	(Spain) B. Caldera / (Spain) C. Goenaga	7	6
15	(Spain) M.R. Abajo / (Spain) N. Canovas	6	4
12	(Spain) J. Castelló / (Spain) L. Rufo	7	6
Bye
4	(Spain) C. Fernández / (Portugal) S. Araújo
3	(Spain) A. Ustero / (Spain) A. Sánchez
Bye
17	(Spain) T. Navarro / (Argentina) V. Riera	3	4
LL	(Spain) L. Manquillo / (Spain) M. Merino	6	6
16	(Russia) K. Sharifova / (Spain) M. Borrero	3	6	3
Q	(Italy) G. Marchetti / (France) L. Godallier	6	3	6
Bye
8	(Spain) M. Guinart / (Spain) V. Virseda
7	(Spain) A. Salazar / (Spain) A. Alonso
Bye
Q	(Spain) N. Aguilar / (Spain) S. Bellver	6	6
WC	(Spain) A. Santamaria / (Spain) C. Castro	1	4
18	(Spain) L. Arruabarrena / (Spain) M. Lobo	3	6	3
19	(France) A. Collombon / (Spain) J. Montes	6	2	6
Bye
2	(Spain) Bea González / (Spain) P. Josemaria

Round of 16
1	(Argentina) D. Brea / (Spain) G. Triay	6	3	*
13	(Spain) M. Barrera / (Spain) J. Velasco	1	0
10	(Spain) L. Sainz / (Spain) R. Barrera	1	0
6	(Spain) M. Ortega / (Spain) M. Calvo	6	6
5	(Argentina) C. Jensen / (Spain) T. Icardo	6	6
9	(Spain) B. Caldera / (Spain) C. Goenaga	1	2
12	(Spain) J. Castelló / (Spain) L. Rufo	2	6
4	(Spain) C. Fernández / (Portugal) S. Araújo	6	7
3	(Spain) A. Ustero / (Spain) A. Sánchez	6	6
LL	(Spain) L. Manquillo / (Spain) M. Merino	4	0
Q	(Italy) G. Marchetti / (France) L. Godallier	5	3
8	(Spain) M. Guinart / (Spain) V. Virseda	7	6
7	(Spain) A. Salazar / (Spain) A. Alonso	6	6
Q	(Spain) N. Aguilar / (Spain) S. Bellver	3	3
19	(France) A. Collombon / (Spain) J. Montes	3	2
2	(Spain) Bea González / (Spain) P. Josemaria	6	6

Quarter-Final
1	(Argentina) D. Brea / (Spain) G. Triay	3	6	6
6	(Spain) M. Ortega / (Spain) M. Calvo	6	4	4
5	(Argentina) C. Jensen / (Spain) T. Icardo	6	7
4	(Spain) C. Fernández / (Portugal) S. Araújo	4	5
3	(Spain) A. Ustero / (Spain) A. Sánchez	6	7
8	(Spain) M. Guinart / (Spain) V. Virseda	3	5
7	(Spain) A. Salazar / (Spain) A. Alonso	2	3
2	(Spain) Bea González / (Spain) P. Josemaria	6	6

Semi-Finals
1	(Argentina) D. Brea / (Spain) G. Triay	6	6
5	(Argentina) C. Jensen / (Spain) T. Icardo	2	2
3	(Spain) A. Ustero / (Spain) A. Sánchez	6	3	6
2	(Spain) Bea González / (Spain) P. Josemaria	2	6	4

Finals
1	(Argentina) D. Brea / (Spain) G. Triay	6	6	6
3	(Spain) A. Ustero / (Spain) A. Sánchez	4	7	3

== Results ==
=== Round of 32 ===
Men's

Date	Winners	Score	Opponent	Refs.
4/3/2026	(Argentina) Maximiliano Arce (Spain) Pablo Lijó	6–1 / 6–4	(Spain) Alberto Garcia Trabanco (Argentina) Miguel Lamperti	
4/3/2026	(Spain) Jairo Bautista (Brazil) Lucas Campagnolo	7–6 / 6–1	(Spain) Alvaro Cepero (Spain) Javi Leal	
4/3/2026	(Argentina) Martin Di Nenno (Spain) Momo González	2–6 / 6–4 / 6–1	(Italy) Enzo Jensen (Spain) Luis Hernandez Quesada	
4/3/2026	(Spain) Eduardo Alonso (Argentina) Juan Tello	4–6 / 6–4 / 6–4	(Spain) Francisco Guerrero (Spain) Paquito Navarro	
4/3/2026	(Spain) Javier Martinez Vazquez (Argentina) Ramiro Valenzuela	6–3 / 6–3	(Argentina) Gonzalo Alfonso (Argentina) Sanyo Gutiérrez	
3/3/2026	(Spain) Guillermo Collado (Spain) Pol Hernandez	6–3 / 7–6	(Spain) Francisco Gil Morales (Argentina) Maxi Sánchez	
3/3/2026	(Spain) Alex Arroyo (Argentina) Leonel Aguirre	6–2 / 6–2	(Spain) Andres Fernandez Lancha (Spain) Jose García Diestro	
3/3/2026	(Argentina) Alex Chozas (Argentina) Valentino Libaak	6–0 / 6–2	(Spain) Alvaro Lopez Campos (Spain) Fran Ramirez	
4/3/2026	(Spain) Coki Nieto (Spain) Jon Sanz	6–3 / 4–6 / 6–3	(Spain) Aléx Ruiz (Spain) Juanlu Esbri	
4/3/2026	(Spain) Javier Garrido (Brazil) Lucas Bergamini	3–6 / 7–5 / 6–4	(Spain) Jose Jimenez Casas (Argentina) Maxi Sanchez Blasco	
3/3/2026	(Spain) David Gala Sánchez (Spain) Pablo García Rodrigo	6–7 / 6–2 / 6–2	(United Arab Emirates) Iñigo Jofre (Spain) Manuel Castaño	
4/3/2026	(Spain) Aimar Goñi (Spain) Enrique Goenaga	7–5 / 6–3	(Spain) Gonzalo Rubio (Spain) Javi Ruiz	

Women's

Date	Winners	Score	Opponent	Refs.
4/3/2026	(Spain) Jimena Velasco (Spain) Marta Barrera	7–6 / 4–6 / 6–4	(Argentina) Martina Fassio Goyeneche (Spain) Patricia Llaguno	
4/3/2026	(Spain) Lucia Sainz (Spain) Raquel Eugenio Barrera	6–1 / 6–3	(Spain) Ana Dominguez Gracia (Italy) Carlotta Casali	
4/3/2026	(Spain) Beatriz Caldera (Spain) Carmen Goenaga	7–6 / 6–2	(Spain) Marta Talavan (Spain) Sofía Saiz Vallejo	
4/3/2026	(Spain) Jessica Castelló (Spain) Lorena Rufo	7–6 / 6–4	(Spain) Laia Rodriguez Abajo (Spain) Noa Canovas	
4/3/2026	(Spain) Letizia María Manquillo (Spain) Melania Merino	6–3 / 6–4	(Spain) Teresa Navarro (Argentina) Virginia Riera	
4/3/2026	(Italy) Giorgia Marchetti (France) Lea Godallier	6–3 / 3–6 / 6–3	(Russia) Ksenia Sharifova (Spain) Marta Borrero	
4/3/2026	(Spain) Noemi Aguilar (Spain) Sandra Bellver	6–1 / 6–4	(Spain) Ainize Santamaria (Spain) Coral Alvarez Castro	
4/3/2026	(France) Alix Collombon (Spain) Jana Montes	6–3 / 2–6 / 6–3	(Spain) Lara Arruabarrena (Spain) Marina Martinez Lobo	

=== Round of 16 ===
Men's

Date	Winners	Score	Opponent	Refs.
5/3/2026	(Argentina) Agustín Tapia (Spain) Arturo Coello	6–3 / 6–7 / 6–3	(Argentina) Maximiliano Arce (Spain) Pablo Lijó	
5/3/2026	(Argentina) Martin Di Nenno (Spain) Momo González	6–3 / 6–1	(Spain) Jairo Bautista (Brazil) Lucas Campagnolo	
5/3/2026	(Spain) Eduardo Alonso (Argentina) Juan Tello	6–1 / 6–2	(Spain) Javier Martinez Vazquez (Argentina) Ramiro Valenzuela	
5/3/2026	(Argentina) Franco Stupaczuk (Spain) Miguel Yanguas	6–2 / 6–2	(Spain) Guillermo Collado (Spain) Pol Hernandez	
5/3/2026	(Spain) Juan Lebrón (Argentina) Leandro Augsburger	6–2 / 6–1	(Spain) Alex Arroyo (Argentina) Leonel Aguirre	
5/3/2026	(Spain) Coki Nieto (Spain) Jon Sanz	7–5 / 3–6 / 6–3	(Argentina) Alex Chozas (Argentina) Valentino Libaak	
5/3/2026	(Spain) Javier Garrido (Brazil) Lucas Bergamini	6–7 / 6–3 / 6–4	(Spain) David Gala Sánchez (Spain) Pablo García Rodrigo	
5/3/2026	(Spain) Alejandro Galán (Argentina) Federico Chingotto	7–5 / 6–3	(Spain) Aimar Goñi (Spain) Enrique Goenaga	

Women's

Date	Winners	Score	Opponent	Refs.
5/3/2026	(Argentina) Delfina Brea (Spain) Gemma Triay	6–1 / 3–0 / W.O.	(Spain) Jimena Velasco (Spain) Marta Barrera	
5/3/2026	(Spain) Marta Ortega (Spain) Martina Calvo	6–1 / 6–0	(Spain) Lucia Sainz (Spain) Raquel Eugenio Barrera	
5/3/2026	(Argentina) Claudia Jensen (Spain) Tamara Icardo	6–1 / 6–2	(Spain) Beatriz Caldera (Spain) Carmen Goenaga	
5/3/2026	(Spain) Claudia Fernández (Portugal) Sofia Araújo	6–2 / 7–6	(Spain) Jessica Castelló (Spain) Lorena Rufo	
5/3/2026	(Spain) Andrea Ustero (Spain) Ariana Sánchez	6–4 / 6–0	(Spain) Letizia María Manquillo (Spain) Melania Merino	
5/3/2026	(Spain) Marina Guinart (Spain) Verónica Virseda	7–5 / 6–3	(Italy) Giorgia Marchetti (France) Lea Godallier	
5/3/2026	(Spain) Alejandra Alonso (Spain) Alejandra Salazar	6–3 / 6–3	(Spain) Noemi Aguilar (Spain) Sandra Bellver	
5/3/2026	(Spain) Bea González (Spain) Paula Josemaría	6–3 / 6–2	(France) Alix Collombon (Spain) Jana Montes	

=== Quarter-Finals ===
Men's

Date	Winners	Score	Opponent	Refs.
6/3/2026	(Argentina) Agustín Tapia (Spain) Arturo Coello	6–3 / 6–1	(Argentina) Martin Di Nenno (Spain) Momo González	
6/3/2026	(Argentina) Franco Stupaczuk (Spain) Miguel Yanguas	6–4 / 6–2	(Spain) Eduardo Alonso (Argentina) Juan Tello	
6/3/2026	(Spain) Coki Nieto (Spain) Jon Sanz	7–5 / 7–6	(Spain) Juan Lebrón (Argentina) Leandro Augsburger	
6/3/2026	(Spain) Alejandro Galán (Argentina) Federico Chingotto	6–2 / 6–1	(Spain) Javier Garrido (Brazil) Lucas Bergamini	

Women's

Date	Winners	Score	Opponent	Refs.
6/3/2026	(Argentina) Delfina Brea (Spain) Gemma Triay	3–6 / 6–4 / 6–4	(Spain) Marta Ortega (Spain) Martina Calvo	
6/3/2026	(Argentina) Claudia Jensen (Spain) Tamara Icardo	6–4 / 7–5	(Spain) Claudia Fernández (Portugal) Sofia Araújo	
6/3/2026	(Spain) Andrea Ustero (Spain) Ariana Sánchez	6–3 / 7–5	(Spain) Marina Guinart (Spain) Verónica Virseda	
6/3/2026	(Spain) Bea González (Spain) Paula Josemaría	6–2 / 6–3	(Spain) Alejandra Alonso (Spain) Alejandra Salazar	

=== Semi-Finals ===
Men's

Date	Winners	Score	Opponent	Refs.
7/3/2026	(Argentina) Agustín Tapia (Spain) Arturo Coello	7–6 / 6–4	(Argentina) Franco Stupaczuk (Spain) Miguel Yanguas	
7/3/2026	(Spain) Alejandro Galán (Argentina) Federico Chingotto	4–6 / 6–3 / 6–4	(Spain) Coki Nieto (Spain) Jon Sanz	

Women's

Date	Winners	Score	Opponent	Refs.
7/3/2026	(Argentina) Delfina Brea (Spain) Gemma Triay	6–2 / 6–2	(Argentina) Claudia Jensen (Spain) Tamara Icardo	
7/3/2026	(Spain) Andrea Ustero (Spain) Ariana Sánchez	6–2 / 3–6 / 6–4	(Spain) Bea González (Spain) Paula Josemaría	

=== Finals ===
Men's

Date	Winners	Score	Opponent	Refs.
8/3/2026	(Spain) Alejandro Galán (Argentina) Federico Chingotto	7–5 / 7–6	(Argentina) Agustín Tapia (Spain) Arturo Coello	

Women's

Date	Winners	Score	Opponent	Refs.
8/3/2026	(Argentina) Delfina Brea (Spain) Gemma Triay	6–4 / 6–7 / 6–3	(Spain) Andrea Ustero (Spain) Ariana Sánchez	
