= 2019 WPT Santander WOpen =

World Padel Tour tournament held in Santander, Spain

- Date: 29 October – 3 November
- Edition: 2nd
- Category: WOpen
- Location: Santander, Spain
- Venue: Polideportivo La Albericia

Champions
- Women's doubles: (Spain) Gemma Triay (Spain) Lucía Sainz

Chronology

The 2019 Santander WOpen (officially 2019 World Padel Tour Santander WOpen) was the fourteenth tournament, and the second-ever exclusively women's event, of the seventh season organized by World Padel Tour, the most prestigious padel circuit at the time.

In the women's category, neither of the top two ranked pairs reached the final for the second time this season. The third-ranked pair, twins Majo and Mapi Sánchez, reached their second consecutive final of the season, while the sixth-ranked pair, Gemma Triay and Lucia Sainz, reached their second final of the season and their first since the fourth tournament of the season, the Vigo Open, six months earlier. In the final, Gemma and Lucia defeated Majo and Mapi in three sets, winning their first title of the year and becoming the second pair to win a WOpen title.

== Head-to-head record between teams ranked in the top 4 during the season ==
=== Women's ===
| Record | Marrero–Ortega | Ariana–Salazar | Majo–Mapi | Josemaria–Nogueira | Former Pairs | Amatriain–Llaguno | Triay–Sainz | Delfina–Majo |
| Marrero–Ortega | — | 4–2 | 0–1 | 4–1 | | 4–2 | 3–0 | 2–0 |
| Ariana–Salazar | 2–4 | — | 1–1 | 3–2 | | 3–0 | 4–0 | 4–0 |
| Majo–Mapi | 1–0 | 1–1 | — | — | | 1–1 | 0–1 | — |
| Josemaria–Nogueira | 1–4 | 2–3 | — | — | | 1–2 | 3–1 | 1–0 |
Former Pairs
| Amatriain–Llaguno | 2–4 | 0–3 | 1–1 | 2–1 | | — | 1–0 | 2–3 |
| Triay–Sainz | 0–3 | 0–4 | 1–0 | 1–3 | | 0–1 | — | — |
| Delfina–Majo | 0–2 | 0–4 | — | 0–1 | | 3–2 | — | — |

== Draws ==
Round of 32
1 | (Spain) M. Marrero / (Spain) M. Ortega
Bye
(Spain) A. Soriano / (Spain) P. Martínez | 6 | 4 | 1
(Spain) L. Alonso / (Spain) S. Pujals | 2 | 6 | 6
(Spain) C. Goenaga / (Spain) N. Rodríguez | 3 | 2
(Spain) L. Martínez / (Spain) T. Navarro | 6 | 6
(Spain) E. Carnicero / (Spain) M. Merino | 2 | 1
5 | (Spain) E. Amatriain / (Spain) P. Llaguno | 6 | 6
7 | (Spain) B. González / (Argentina) D. Brea | 6 | 6
(Spain) E. Ramírez / (Spain) M. Talavan | 1 | 2
(Spain) A. Tapia / (Spain) J. Castelló | 6 | 3 | 4
(Argentina) C. Paz / (Spain) S. Ruiz | 2 | 6 | 6
(Spain) A. Martinez / (Argentina) C. Tenorio | 5 | 0
(Spain) M. Villalba / (Spain) V. Virseda | 7 | 6
Bye
3 | (Spain) Majo / (Spain) Mapi
4 | (Portugal) A.C. Nogueira / (Spain) P. Josemaría
Bye
(Spain) A. Cantin / (Spain) N. Rovira | 1 | 0
(Spain) A. Galán / (Spain) V. Iglesias | 6 | 6
(France) A. Collombon / (Spain) N. Traviesa | 6 | 6
(Argentina) A. Osoro / (Argentina) N. Brito | 7 | 7
(Spain) A. Blanco / (Spain) B. Caldera | 2 | 2
8 | (Spain) C. Navarro / (Argentina) C. Reiter | 6 | 6
6 | (Spain) Gemma / (Spain) L. Sainz | 6 | 6
(Argentina) J. Bidahorria / (Brazil) R. Piltcher | 0 | 1
(Spain) J. Bautista / (Spain) L. Torres | 2 | 3
(Portugal) S. Araújo / (Argentina) V. Riera | 6 | 6
(Spain) S. Hernández / (Spain) T. Icardo | 6 | 6
(Spain) A.F. de Ossó / (Spain) C. Mesa | 3 | 3
Bye
2 | (Spain) Ariana / (Spain) Salazar

Round of 16
1 | (Spain) M. Marrero / (Spain) M. Ortega | 6 | 6
(Spain) L. Alonso / (Spain) S. Pujals | 1 | 3
(Spain) L. Martínez / (Spain) T. Navarro | 2 | 2
5 | (Spain) E. Amatriain / (Spain) P. Llaguno | 6 | 6
7 | (Spain) B. González / (Argentina) D. Brea | 6 | 6
(Argentina) C. Paz / (Spain) S. Ruiz | 0 | 2
(Spain) M. Villalba / (Spain) V. Virseda | 4 | 5
3 | (Spain) Majo / (Spain) Mapi | 6 | 7
4 | (Portugal) A.C. Nogueira / (Spain) P. Josemaría | 6 | 6
(Spain) A. Galán / (Spain) V. Iglesias | 1 | 3
(Argentina) A. Osoro / (Argentina) N. Brito | 6 | 5 | 3
8 | (Spain) C. Navarro / (Argentina) C. Reiter | 1 | 7 | 6
6 | (Spain) Gemma / (Spain) L. Sainz | 7 | 6
(Portugal) S. Araújo / (Argentina) V. Riera | 5 | 1
(Spain) S. Hernández / (Spain) T. Icardo | 7 | 6
2 | (Spain) Ariana / (Spain) Salazar | 5 | 3

Quarter-Final
1 | (Spain) M. Marrero / (Spain) M. Ortega | 6 | 6
5 | (Spain) E. Amatriain / (Spain) P. Llaguno | 4 | 4
7 | (Spain) B. González / (Argentina) D. Brea | 1 | 1
3 | (Spain) Majo / (Spain) Mapi | 6 | 4 | *
4 | (Portugal) A.C. Nogueira / (Spain) P. Josemaría | 3 | 7 | 6
8 | (Spain) C. Navarro / (Argentina) C. Reiter | 6 | 6 | 2
6 | (Spain) Gemma / (Spain) L. Sainz | 6 | 5 | 6
(Spain) S. Hernández / (Spain) T. Icardo | 1 | 7 | 2

Semi-Finals
1 | (Spain) M. Marrero / (Spain) M. Ortega | 4 | 3
3 | (Spain) Majo / (Spain) Mapi | 6 | 6
4 | (Portugal) A.C. Nogueira / (Spain) P. Josemaría | 5 | 6 | 3
6 | (Spain) Gemma / (Spain) L. Sainz | 7 | 3 | 6

Finals
3 | (Spain) Majo / (Spain) Mapi | 2 | 7 | 4
6 | (Spain) Gemma / (Spain) L. Sainz | 6 | 6 | 6

== Results ==
=== Round of 32 ===
| Date | Winners | Score | Opponent | Refs. |
|---|---|---|---|---|
| 30/10/2019 | (Spain) Lorena Alonso (Spain) Sara Pujals | 2–6 / 6–4 / 6–1 | (Spain) Arantxa Soriano (Spain) Patricia Martínez | |
| 30/10/2019 | (Spain) Lucía Martínez (Spain) Teresa Navarro | 6–3 / 6–2 | (Spain) Carmen Goenaga (Spain) Nuria Rodríguez | |
| 30/10/2019 | (Spain) Elisabeth Amatriain (Spain) Patricia Llaguno | 6–2 / 6–1 | (Spain) Esther Carnicero (Spain) Melania Merino | |
| 30/10/2019 | (Spain) Bea González (Argentina) Delfina Brea | 6–1 / 6–2 | (Spain) Elena Ramírez (Spain) Marta Talavan | |
| 30/10/2019 | (Argentina) Celeste Paz (Spain) Sara Ruiz | 2–6 / 6–3 / 6–4 | (Spain) Anna Cortiles Tapia (Spain) Jessica Castelló | |
| 30/10/2019 | (Spain) Maria Villalba (Spain) Verónica Virseda | 7–5 / 6–0 | (Spain) Araceli Martinez (Argentina) Catalina Tenorio | |
| 30/10/2019 | (Spain) Alba Galán (Spain) Victoria Iglesias | 6–1 / 6–0 | (Spain) Angela Caro Cantin (Spain) Nuria Rovira | |
| 30/10/2019 | (Argentina) Aranzazu Osoro (Argentina) Nela Brito | 7–6 / 7–6 | (France) Alix Collombon (Spain) Nicole Traviesa Mola | |
| 30/10/2019 | (Spain) Carolina Navarro (Argentina) Cecilia Reiter | 6–2 / 6–2 | (Spain) Alicia Blanco Rojo (Spain) Beatriz Caldera | |
| 30/10/2019 | (Spain) Gemma Triay (Spain) Lucia Sainz | 6–0 / 6–1 | (Argentina) Julieta Bidahorria (Brazil) Raquel Piltcher | |
| 30/10/2019 | (Portugal) Sofia Araújo (Argentina) Virginia Riera | 6–2 / 6–3 | (Spain) Julia Polo Bautista (Spain) Laia Bonilla Torres | |
| 30/10/2019 | (Spain) Sandra Hernández (Spain) Tamara Icardo | 6–3 / 6–3 | (Spain) Ana Fernández de Ossó (Spain) Carla Mesa | |

=== Round of 16 ===
| Date | Winners | Score | Opponent | Refs. |
|---|---|---|---|---|
| 31/10/2019 | (Spain) Marta Marrero (Spain) Marta Ortega | 6–1 / 6–3 | (Spain) Lorena Alonso (Spain) Sara Pujals | |
| 31/10/2019 | (Spain) Elisabeth Amatriain (Spain) Patricia Llaguno | 6–2 / 6–2 | (Spain) Lucía Martínez (Spain) Teresa Navarro | |
| 31/10/2019 | (Spain) Bea González (Argentina) Delfina Brea | 6–0 / 6–2 | (Argentina) Celeste Paz (Spain) Sara Ruiz | |
| 31/10/2019 | (Spain) Majo Sánchez (Spain) Mapi Sánchez | 6–4 / 7–5 | (Spain) Maria Villalba (Spain) Verónica Virseda | |
| 31/10/2019 | (Portugal) Ana Catarina Nogueira (Spain) Paula Josemaría | 6–1 / 6–3 | (Spain) Alba Galán (Spain) Victoria Iglesias | |
| 31/10/2019 | (Spain) Carolina Navarro (Argentina) Cecilia Reiter | 1–6 / 7–5 / 6–3 | (Argentina) Aranzazu Osoro (Argentina) Nela Brito | |
| 31/10/2019 | (Spain) Gemma Triay (Spain) Lucia Sainz | 7–5 / 6–1 | (Portugal) Sofia Araújo (Argentina) Virginia Riera | |
| 31/10/2019 | (Spain) Sandra Hernández (Spain) Tamara Icardo | 7–5 / 6–3 | (Spain) Alejandra Salazar (Spain) Ariana Sánchez | |

=== Quarter-Finals ===
| Date | Winners | Score | Opponent | Refs. |
|---|---|---|---|---|
| 1/11/2019 | (Spain) Marta Marrero (Spain) Marta Ortega | 6–4 / 6–4 | (Spain) Elisabeth Amatriain (Spain) Patricia Llaguno | |
| 1/11/2019 | (Spain) Majo Sánchez (Spain) Mapi Sánchez | 6–1 / 4–1 / W.O. | (Spain) Bea González (Argentina) Delfina Brea | |
| 1/11/2019 | (Portugal) Ana Catarina Nogueira (Spain) Paula Josemaría | 3–6 / 7–6 / 6–2 | (Spain) Carolina Navarro (Argentina) Cecilia Reiter | |
| 1/11/2019 | (Spain) Gemma Triay (Spain) Lucia Sainz | 6–1 / 5–7 / 6–2 | (Spain) Sandra Hernández (Spain) Tamara Icardo | |

=== Semi-Finals ===
| Date | Winners | Score | Opponent | Refs. |
|---|---|---|---|---|
| 2/11/2019 | (Spain) Majo Sánchez (Spain) Mapi Sánchez | 6–4 / 6–3 | (Spain) Marta Marrero (Spain) Marta Ortega | |
| 2/11/2019 | (Spain) Gemma Triay (Spain) Lucia Sainz | 7–5 / 3–6 / 6–3 | (Portugal) Ana Catarina Nogueira (Spain) Paula Josemaría | |

=== Finals ===
| Date | Winners | Score | Opponent | Refs. |
|---|---|---|---|---|
| 3/11/2019 | (Spain) Gemma Triay (Spain) Lucia Sainz | 6–2 / 6–7 / 6–4 | (Spain) Majo Sánchez (Spain) Mapi Sánchez | |
