= 2026 Bordeaux P2 =

Premier Padel tournament held in Bordeaux

- Date: 28 June – 5 July
- Edition: 3rd
- Category: P2
- Prize money: €264.534
- Location: Bordeaux, France
- Venue: Patinoire de Mériadeck
- Court speed: Slow

Champions
- Men's doubles: (Argentina) Agustín Tapia (Spain) Arturo Coello
- Women's doubles: (Argentina) Claudia Jensen (Spain) Tamara Icardo

Chronology

The 2026 Bordeaux P2 (officially 2026 Premier Padel Betclic Bordeaux P2) was the twelfth tournament of the fifth season organized by Premier Padel, the premier padel circuit, promoted by the International Padel Federation, and with the financial backing of Nasser Al-Khelaïfi's Qatar Sports Investments.

In the women's category, world number ones Delfina Brea and Gemma Triay reached their tenth final of the season out of twelve tournaments played. However, in the final match against the number 5 seeds, they were defeated by Claudia Jensen and Tamara Icardo, who became the first pair outside the top 3 to win a title in 2026.

In the men's category, the top two pairs in the FIP rankings reached the final for the sixth consecutive tournament, marking the ninth time this season. In the title match, Agustín Tapia and Arturo Coello defeated Alejandro Galán and Federico Chingotto for the fourth consecutive time, claiming their sixth title of 2026.

== Relevant Data ==
=== Galán reaches his 100th career final while Coello and Tapia extend their finals streak ===
By reaching the final alongside Federico Chingotto, Alejandro Galán played his 100th major tournament final against Agustín Tapia and Arturo Coello, who extended their own streak to 26 consecutive finals.

=== A historic achievement for Icardo and Jensen in Bordeaux ===
World No. 1s Delfina Brea and Gemma Triay were seeking their fourth title of the season in the final against the tournament's sensation, Claudia Jensen and Tamara Icardo. In Bordeaux, Jensen and Icardo had already defeated three top contenders one by one: Claudia Fernández and Sofia Araújo in the quarterfinals, Bea González and Paula Josemaría in the semifinals, and the world No. 1s in the grand final to claim their first trophy as a pair this season.

== Seeds ==
Male

Rnk.	Team	FIP Ranking Points
1	(Argentina) Agustín Tapia (Spain) Arturo Coello	43246
2	(Spain) Alejandro Galán (Argentina) Federico Chingotto	35252
3	(Spain) Juan Lebrón (Argentina) Leandro Augsburguer	14826
4	(Argentina) Franco Stupaczuk (Spain) Mike Yanguas	13941
5	(Spain) Coki Nieto (Spain) Jon Sanz	11052
6	(Argentina) Martín Di Nenno (Spain) Paquito Navarro	10897
7	(Spain) Francisco Guerrero (Spain) Javi Leal	7762
8	(Brazil) Lucas Campagnolo (Spain) Momo González	7379
9	(Argentina) Juan Tello (Argentina) Maximiliano Arce	5416
10	(Spain) Aimar Goñi (Spain) Eduardo Alonso	4960
11	(Spain) Alejandro Ruiz (Spain) Juanlu Esbri	4948
12	(Spain) Javier Garcia Mora (Spain) Jose Jimenez Casas	4583
13	(Argentina) Gonzalo Alfonso (Spain) Javier Barahona	4433
14	(United Arab Emirates) Inigo Jofre (Spain) Jairo Bautista	4302
15	(Spain) Guillermo Collado (Spain) Pol Hernandez	3969
16	(Argentina) Maximiliano Sánchez Blasco (Argentina) Sanyo Gutiérrez	3894

Female

Rnk.	Team	FIP Ranking Points
1	(Argentina) Delfina Brea (Spain) Gemma Triay	35446
2	(Spain) Bea González (Spain) Paula Josemaria	28757
3	(Spain) Ariana Sánchez (Spain) Andrea Ustero	23174
4	(Spain) Claudia Fernandéz (Portugal) Sofia Araújo	19547
5	(Argentina) Claudia Jensen (Spain) Tamara Icardo	12007
6	(Spain) Marta Ortega (Spain) Martina Calvo	11509
7	(Spain) Alejandra Alonso (Spain) Alejandra Salazar	9749
8	(Spain) Marina Guinart (Spain) Veronica Virseda	8589
9	(Spain) Beatriz Caldera (Spain) Carmen Goenaga	7002
10	(Argentina) Aranzazu Osoro (Spain) Victoria Iglesias	6197
11	(Spain) Jimena Velasco (Spain) Marta Barrera	4357
12	(Italy) Giulia Dal Pozzo (Spain) Nuria Rodriguez	4323
13	(Spain) Lucía Sainz (Spain) Jana Montes Cabruja	4241
14	(Spain) Jessica Castelló (Spain) Marta Talavan	3827
15	(Spain) Lorena Rufo (Spain) Marta Talavan	3705
16	(Spain) Maria Rodriguez Abajo (Spain) Noa Canovas	3583

== Head-to-head record between teams ranked in the top 4 during the season ==
=== Men's ===
Record	Coello–Tapia	Galán–Chingotto	Augsburger–Lebrón	Stupaczuk–Yanguas
Coello–Tapia	—	5–4	5–1	5–0
Galán–Chingotto	4–5	—	3–1	3–0
Augsburger–Lebrón	1–5	1–3	—	—
Stupaczuk–Yanguas	0–5	0–3	—	—

=== Women's ===
Record	D. Brea–Triay	B. González–Paula	Ariana–Ustero	Araúijo–C. Fernandez
D. Brea–Triay	—	1–5	4–3	3–0
B. González–Paula	5–1	—	4–3	2–0
Ariana–Ustero	3–4	3–4	—	1–0
Araúijo–C. Fernandez	0–3	0–2	0–1	—

== Draws ==
=== Men's Bracket ===
Round of 32
1	(Spain) Coello / (Argentina) Tapia
Bye
15	(Spain) G. Collado / (Spain) P.H. Alvarez	1	4
Q	(Spain) F. Gil / (Argentina) Maxi	6	6
10	(Spain) A. Goñi / (Spain) E. Alonso	6	3	6
16	(Argentina) M. Blasco / (Argentina) Sanyo	3	6	3
Q	(Italy) A. Montiel / (Italy) F. Abbate	6	4
8	(Brazil) L. Campagnolo / (Spain) Momo	7	6
6	(Argentina) Di Nenno / (Spain) Paquito	6	6
19	(Spain) P.G. Rodrigo / (Spain) P. Lijó	0	1
WC	(Belgium) C. Geens / (France) D. Guichard	4	4
14	(United Arab Emirates) I. Jofre / (Spain) J. Bautista	6	6
13	(Argentina) G. Alfonso / (Spain) J. Barahona	6	6
22	(Spain) M. Ortega / (Spain) V. Ruiz	7	7
Bye
3	(Spain) Lebrón / (Argentina) L. Augsburger
4	(Argentina) Stupaczuk / (Spain) Yanguas
Bye
WC	(France) T. Fonteny / (France) Y. Boronad	0	2
17	(Argentina) A. Chozas / (Argentina) V. Libaak	6	6
Q	(Spain) I. Sager / (Argentina) J.C. Belluati	2	7	4
9	(Argentina) J. Tello / (Argentina) M. Arce	6	6	6
20	(Argentina) L. Aguirre / (Argentina) R. Valenzuela	6	3	2
7	(Spain) F. Guerrero / (Spain) J. Leal	4	6	6
5	(Spain) Coki / (Spain) J. Sanz	6	6
21	(Argentina) I. Piotto / (Spain) J.G. Diestro	3	2
12	(Spain) J.G. Mora / (Spain) J.J. Casas	4	2
11	(Spain) A. Ruiz / (Spain) J. Esbri	6	6
18	(Spain) D.G. Sánchez / (Italy) E. Jensen	7	6
Q	(Argentina) F. Mouriño / (Spain) M. Quilez	6	1
Bye
2	(Argentina) Chingotto / (Spain) Galán

Round of 16
1	(Spain) Coello / (Argentina) Tapia	6	6
Q	(Spain) F. Gil / (Argentina) Maxi	0	1
10	(Spain) A. Goñi / (Spain) E. Alonso	6	1
8	(Brazil) L. Campagnolo / (Spain) Momo	7	6
6	(Argentina) Di Nenno / (Spain) Paquito	6	6
14	(United Arab Emirates) I. Jofre / (Spain) J. Bautista	2	1
22	(Spain) M. Ortega / (Spain) V. Ruiz	3	3
3	(Spain) Lebrón / (Argentina) L. Augsburger	6	6
4	(Argentina) Stupaczuk / (Spain) Yanguas	6	6
17	(Argentina) A. Chozas / (Argentina) V. Libaak	2	4
9	(Argentina) J. Tello / (Argentina) M. Arce	6	6	7
7	(Spain) F. Guerrero / (Spain) J. Leal	1	7	6
5	(Spain) Coki / (Spain) J. Sanz	6	6
11	(Spain) A. Ruiz / (Spain) J. Esbri	3	4
18	(Spain) D.G. Sánchez / (Italy) E. Jensen	4	2
2	(Argentina) Chingotto / (Spain) Galán	6	6

Quarter-Final
1	(Spain) Coello / (Argentina) Tapia	7	3	6
8	(Brazil) L. Campagnolo / (Spain) Momo	5	6	1
6	(Argentina) Di Nenno / (Spain) Paquito	6	7
3	(Spain) Lebrón / (Argentina) L. Augsburger	3	5
4	(Argentina) Stupaczuk / (Spain) Yanguas	7	6
9	(Argentina) J. Tello / (Argentina) M. Arce	5	4
5	(Spain) Coki / (Spain) J. Sanz	1	3
2	(Argentina) Chingotto / (Spain) Galán	6	6

Semi-Finals
1	(Spain) Coello / (Argentina) Tapia	6	6
6	(Argentina) Di Nenno / (Spain) Paquito	3	2
4	(Argentina) Stupaczuk / (Spain) Yanguas	5	5
2	(Argentina) Chingotto / (Spain) Galán	7	7

Finals
1	(Spain) Coello / (Argentina) Tapia	5	7	6
2	(Argentina) Chingotto / (Spain) Galán	7	6	2

=== Women's Bracket ===
Round of 32
1	(Argentina) D. Brea / (Spain) G. Triay
Bye
WC	(Argentina) D. Valenzuela / (France) L. Godallier	3	5
9	(Spain) B. Caldera / (Spain) C. Goenaga	6	7
19	(Argentina) J. Bidahorria / (Spain) M. Caparros	6	6
Q	(Spain) C.F. Goyeneche / (Germany) V. Kurz	2	2
Bye
8	(Spain) M. Guinart / (Spain) V. Virseda
7	(Spain) A. Salazar / (Spain) A. Alonso
Bye
Q	(Italy) G. Marchetti / (Spain) M. Borrero	6	6	5
15	(Spain) L. Rufo / (Spain) S. Saiz	7	0	7
Q	(Spain) A. Martinez / (Spain) L. Lujan	6	4	5
12	(Italy) G. Dal Pozzo / (Spain) N. Rodriguez	3	6	7
Bye
3	(Spain) A. Ustero / (Spain) A. Sánchez
4	(Spain) C. Fernández / (Portugal) S. Araújo
Bye
18	(Spain) A. Perez / (Spain) L. Martinez	1	6
14	(Spain) J. Castelló / (Spain) M. Talavan	6	7
11	(Spain) J. Velasco / (Spain) M. Barrera	6	3	2
10	(Argentina) A. Osoro / (Spain) V. Iglesias	3	6	6
Bye
5	(Argentina) C. Jensen / (Spain) T. Icardo
6	(Spain) M. Ortega / (Spain) M. Calvo
Bye
Q	(Spain) L. Peralta / (Argentina) M. Ferreyra	7	3	0
16	(Spain) M.R Abajo / (Spain) N. Canovas	6	6	6
13	(Spain) J. Montes / (Spain) L. Sainz	2	7	6
17	(France) A. Collombon / (Russia) K. Sharifova	6	5	7
Bye
2	(Spain) B. González / (Spain) P. Josemaria

Round of 16
1	(Argentina) D. Brea / (Spain) G. Triay	6	6
9	(Spain) B. Caldera / (Spain) C. Goenaga	3	3
19	(Argentina) J. Bidahorria / (Spain) M. Caparros	4	4
8	(Spain) M. Guinart / (Spain) V. Virseda	6	6
7	(Spain) A. Salazar / (Spain) A. Alonso	6	6
15	(Spain) L. Rufo / (Spain) S. Saiz	2	4
12	(Italy) G. Dal Pozzo / (Spain) N. Rodriguez	2	5
3	(Spain) A. Ustero / (Spain) A. Sánchez	6	7
4	(Spain) C. Fernández / (Portugal) S. Araújo	3	6	7
14	(Spain) J. Castelló / (Spain) M. Talavan	6	1	5
10	(Argentina) A. Osoro / (Spain) V. Iglesias	4	1
5	(Argentina) C. Jensen / (Spain) T. Icardo	6	6
6	(Spain) M. Ortega / (Spain) M. Calvo	3	2
16	(Spain) M.R Abajo / (Spain) N. Canovas	6	6
17	(France) A. Collombon / (Russia) K. Sharifova	1	2
2	(Spain) B. González / (Spain) P. Josemaria	6	6

Quarter-Final
1	(Argentina) D. Brea / (Spain) G. Triay	6	7
8	(Spain) M. Guinart / (Spain) V. Virseda	0	6
7	(Spain) A. Salazar / (Spain) A. Alonso	2	6
3	(Spain) A. Ustero / (Spain) A. Sánchez	6	7
4	(Spain) C. Fernández / (Portugal) S. Araújo	4	6	2
5	(Argentina) C. Jensen / (Spain) T. Icardo	6	2	6
16	(Spain) M.R Abajo / (Spain) N. Canovas	3	2
2	(Spain) B. González / (Spain) P. Josemaria	6	6

Semi-Finals
1	(Argentina) D. Brea / (Spain) G. Triay	7	6
3	(Spain) A. Ustero / (Spain) A. Sánchez	5	1
5	(Argentina) C. Jensen / (Spain) T. Icardo	6	6
2	(Spain) B. González / (Spain) P. Josemaria	4	3

Finals
1	(Argentina) D. Brea / (Spain) G. Triay	6	1	1
5	(Argentina) C. Jensen / (Spain) T. Icardo	3	6	6

== Results ==
=== Round of 32 ===
Men's

Date	Winners	Score	Opponent	Refs.
1/7/2026	(Spain) Francisco Manuel Gil (Argentina) Maxi Sanchéz	6–1 / 6–4	(Spain) Guillermo Collado (Spain) Pol Hernandez	
30/6/2026	(Spain) Aimar Goñi (Spain) Eduardo Alonso	6–3 / 3–6 / 6–3	(Argentina) Maximiliano Sánchez Blasco (Argentina) Sanyo Gutiérrez	
1/7/2026	(Brazil) Lucas Campagnolo (Spain) Momo González	7–6 / 6–4	(Italy) Alvaro Montiel Caruso (Italy) Flavio Abbate	
1/7/2026	(Argentina) Martin Di Nenno (Spain) Paquito Navarro	6–0 / 6–1	(Spain) Pablo Garcia Rodrigo (Spain) Pablo Lijó	
1/7/2026	(United Arab Emirates) Inigo Jofre (Spain) Jairo Bautista	6–4 / 6–4	(Belgium) Clement Geens (France) Dylan Guichard	
1/7/2026	(Spain) Mario Ortega (Spain) Victor Ruiz	7–6 / 7–6	(Argentina) Gonzalo Alfonso (Spain) Javier Barahona	
1/7/2026	(Argentina) Alex Chozas (Argentina) Valentino Libaak	6–0 / 6–2	(France) Timeo Fonteny (France) Yoan Boronad	
1/7/2026	(Argentina) Juan Tello (Argentina) Maximiliano Arce	6–2 / 6–7 / 6–4	(Spain) Ignacio Sager (Argentina) Juan Cruz Belluati	
1/7/2026	(Spain) Francisco Guerrero (Spain) Javi Leal	4–6 / 6–3 / 6–2	(Argentina) Leonel Aguirre (Argentina) Ramiro Valenzuela	
1/7/2026	(Spain) Coki Nieto (Spain) Jon Sanz	6–3 / 6–2	(Argentina) Ignacio Piotto (Spain) Jose Garcia Diestro	
30/6/2026	(Spain) Aléx Ruiz (Spain) Juanlu Esbri	6–4 / 6–2	(Spain) Javier Garcia Mora (Spain) Jose Jimenez Casas	
1/7/2026	(Spain) David Gala Sánchez (Italy) Enzo Jensen	7–6 / 6–1	(Argentina) Federico Mouriño (Spain) Marc Quilez	

Women's

Date	Winners	Score	Opponent	Refs.
1/7/2026	(Spain) Beatriz Caldera (Spain) Carmen Goenaga	6–3 / 7–5	(Argentina) Daiara Valenzuela (France) Lea Godallier	
1/7/2026	(Argentina) Julieta Bidahorria (Spain) Marta Caparros	6–2 / 6–2	(Spain) Camila Fassio Goyeneche (Germany) Victoria Kurz	
1/7/2026	(Spain) Jessica Castelló (Spain) Lorena Rufo	7–6 / 0–6 / 7–5	(Italy) Giorgia Marchetti (Spain) Marta Borrero	
1/7/2026	(Italy) Giulia Dal Pozzo (Spain) Nuria Rodriguez	3–6 / 6–4 / 7–5	(Spain) Araceli Martinez (Spain) Laura Lujan Rodriguez	
1/7/2026	(Spain) Jessica Castelló (Spain) Marta Talavan	6–1 / 7–6	(Spain) Agueda Perez (Spain) Lucia Martinez	
1/7/2026	(Argentina) Aranzazu Osoro (Spain) Victoria Iglesias	3–6 / 6–3 / 6–2	(Spain) Jimena Velasco (Spain) Marta Barrera	
1/7/2026	(Spain) Maria Rodriguez Abajo (Spain) Noa Canovas	6–7 / 6–3 / 6–0	(Spain) Lucia Peralta (Argentina) Maria Ferreyra	
1/7/2026	(France) Alix Collombon (Russia) Ksenia Sharifova	6–2 / 5–7 / 7–6	(Spain) Lucía Sainz (Spain) Jana Montes	

=== Round of 16 ===
Men's

Date	Winners	Score	Opponent	Refs.
2/7/2026	(Argentina) Agustín Tapia (Spain) Arturo Coello	6–0 / 6–1	(Spain) Francisco Manuel Gil (Argentina) Maxi Sanchéz	
2/7/2026	(Brazil) Lucas Campagnolo (Spain) Momo González	7–6 / 6–1	(Spain) Aimar Goñi (Spain) Eduardo Alonso	
2/7/2026	(Argentina) Martin Di Nenno (Spain) Paquito Navarro	6–2 / 6–1	(United Arab Emirates) Inigo Jofre (Spain) Jairo Bautista	
2/7/2026	(Spain) Juan Lebrón (Argentina) Leandro Augsburger	6–3 / 6–3	(Spain) Mario Ortega (Spain) Victor Ruiz	
2/7/2026	(Argentina) Franco Stupaczuk (Spain) Mike Yanguas	6–2 / 6–4	(Argentina) Alex Chozas (Argentina) Valentino Libaak	
2/7/2026	(Argentina) Juan Tello (Argentina) Maximiliano Arce	6–1 / 6–7 / 7–6	(Spain) Francisco Guerrero (Spain) Javi Leal	
2/7/2026	(Spain) Coki Nieto (Spain) Jon Sanz	6–3 / 6–4	(Spain) Aléx Ruiz (Spain) Juanlu Esbri	
2/7/2026	(Spain) Alejandro Galán (Argentina) Federico Chingotto	6–4 / 6–2	(Spain) David Gala Sánchez (Italy) Enzo Jensen	

Women's

Date	Winners	Score	Opponent	Refs.
2/7/2026	(Argentina) Delfina Brea (Spain) Gemma Triay	6–3 / 6–3	(Spain) Beatriz Caldera (Spain) Carmen Goenaga	
2/7/2026	(Spain) Marina Guinart (Spain) Verónica Virseda	6–4 / 6–4	(Argentina) Julieta Bidahorria (Spain) Marta Caparros	
2/7/2026	(Spain) Alejandra Alonso (Spain) Alejandra Salazar	6–2 / 6–4	(Spain) Jessica Castelló (Spain) Lorena Rufo	
2/7/2026	(Spain) Andrea Ustero (Spain) Ariana Sánchez	6–2 / 7–5	(Italy) Giulia Dal Pozzo (Spain) Nuria Rodriguez	
2/7/2026	(Spain) Claudia Fernández (Portugal) Sofia Araújo	3–6 / 6–1 / 7–5	(Spain) Jessica Castelló (Spain) Marta Talavan	
2/7/2026	(Argentina) Claudia Jensen (Spain) Tamara Icardo	6–4 / 6–1	(Argentina) Aranzazu Osoro (Spain) Victoria Iglesias	
2/7/2026	(Spain) Maria Rodriguez Abajo (Spain) Noa Canovas	6–3 / 6–2	(Spain) Marta Ortega (Spain) Martina Calvo	
2/7/2026	(Spain) Bea González (Spain) Paula Josemaría	6–1 / 6–2	(France) Alix Collombon (Russia) Ksenia Sharifova	

=== Quarter-Finals ===
Men's

Date	Winners	Score	Opponent	Refs.
3/6/2026	(Argentina) Agustín Tapia (Spain) Arturo Coello	7–5 / 3–6 / 6–1	(Brazil) Lucas Campagnolo (Spain) Momo González	
3/6/2026	(Argentina) Martin Di Nenno (Spain) Paquito Navarro	6–3 / 7–5	(Spain) Juan Lebrón (Argentina) Leandro Augsburger	
3/6/2026	(Argentina) Franco Stupaczuk (Spain) Mike Yanguas	7–5 / 6–4	(Argentina) Juan Tello (Argentina) Maximiliano Arce	
3/6/2026	(Spain) Alejandro Galán (Argentina) Federico Chingotto	6–1 / 6–3	(Spain) Coki Nieto (Spain) Jon Sanz	

Women's

Date	Winners	Score	Opponent	Refs.
3/6/2026	(Argentina) Delfina Brea (Spain) Gemma Triay	6–0 / 7–6	(Spain) Marina Guinart (Spain) Verónica Virseda	
3/6/2026	(Spain) Andrea Ustero (Spain) Ariana Sánchez	6–2 / 7–6	(Spain) Alejandra Alonso (Spain) Alejandra Salazar	
3/6/2026	(Argentina) Claudia Jensen (Spain) Tamara Icardo	6–4 / 2–6 / 6–2	(Spain) Claudia Fernández (Portugal) Sofia Araújo	
3/6/2026	(Spain) Bea González (Spain) Paula Josemaría	6–3 / 6–2	(Spain) Maria Rodriguez Abajo (Spain) Noa Canovas	

=== Semi-Finals ===
Men's

Date	Winners	Score	Opponent	Refs.
4/6/2026	(Argentina) Agustín Tapia (Spain) Arturo Coello	6–3 / 6–2	(Argentina) Martin Di Nenno (Spain) Paquito Navarro	
4/6/2026	(Spain) Alejandro Galán (Argentina) Federico Chingotto	7–5 / 7–5	(Argentina) Franco Stupaczuk (Spain) Mike Yanguas	

Women's

Date	Winners	Score	Opponent	Refs.
4/6/2026	(Argentina) Delfina Brea (Spain) Gemma Triay	7–5 / 6–1	(Spain) Andrea Ustero (Spain) Ariana Sánchez	
4/6/2026	(Argentina) Claudia Jensen (Spain) Tamara Icardo	6–4 / 6–3	(Spain) Bea González (Spain) Paula Josemaría	

=== Finals ===
Men's

Date	Winners	Score	Opponent	Refs.
5/7/2026	(Argentina) Agustín Tapia (Spain) Arturo Coello	5–7 / 7–6 / 6–2	(Spain) Alejandro Galán (Argentina) Federico Chingotto	

Women's

Date	Winners	Score	Opponent	Refs.
5/7/2026	(Argentina) Claudia Jensen (Spain) Tamara Icardo	3–6 / 6–1 / 6–1	(Argentina) Delfina Brea (Spain) Gemma Triay	
