= 2020 WPT Master Final =

World Padel Tour tournament held in Menorca, Spain

- Date: 10 – 13 December
- Edition: 15th (Note: The first seven editions we're held under the organization of the Padel Pro Tour.)
- Category: Master Final
- Location: Menorca, Spain
- Venue: Pavelló Menorca

Champions
- Men's doubles: (Argentina) Agustín Tapia (Argentina) Fernando Belasteguín
- Women's doubles: (Spain) Gemma Triay (Spain) Lucía Sainz

Chronology
Previous
Las Rozas Open
Next
Madrid Open
(2021)

The 2020 WPT Master Final (officially 2020 World Padel Tour Estrella Damm Menorca Master Final) was the eleventh and final tournament of the eight season organized by World Padel Tour, the most prestigious padel circuit at the time.

In the women's category, the top two ranked pairs reached the final. The first finalists were the world number 1s, Gemma Triay and Lucia Sainz, who eliminated the fourth-ranked pair, Marta Marrero and Marta Ortega, to reach the final. Their opponents were their main rivals in the fight for the number 1 ranking and second-ranked pair, Alejandra Salazar and Ariana Sánchez, who eliminated Elisabeth Amatriain and Patricia Llaguno to reach the final. In the decisive match, with both pairs playing their last tournament together, Gemma and Lucia defeated the defending champions Ariana and Salazar in two sets, winning their fifth title of the season and their fourth consecutive. With the victory, in addition to winning the first Masters Final of their careers, Gemma and Lucia said goodbye as a pair winning their last tournament together and as year-end world number ones.

In the men's category, the first and third-ranked pairs both reached the final for a rematch of the final of the third tournament of the season. The first finalists were the number one ranked pair, Alejandro Galán and Juan Lebrón, who eliminated Martín Di Nenno and Maxi Sánchez to reach their eighth final of the year (out of eleven possible). In the other semifinal, with both pairs seeking their fourth final of the year, the number three ranked pair, Agustín Tapia and Fernando Belasteguín, defeated the number two ranked pair, Franco Stupaczuk and Sanyo Gutiérrez, for the first time, qualifying for the final. In the title match, Belasteguín and Tapia, in their last match as a pair, defeated Galán and Lebrón in two sets, becoming the oldest and youngest 'Maestro' ever respectively and preventing Galán from retaining the title won the previous year. With this victory, Tapia would win his first Master Final while Belasteguín would win his eighth (having previously won in 2006, 2007, 2009, 2010, 2011, 2017 and 2018).

== Relevant Data ==
=== The last tournament for many pairs ===
As is tradition, the Master Final would be the last tournament for several pairs. The most notable separation would be the breakup of the number one and two pairs on the circuit, with Gemma Triay opting to end her five-year partnership with Lucia Sainz, to join forces with her long-time rival Alejandra Salazar. Ariana Sánchez would join forces with Paula Josemaria, thus breaking up the third-ranked pair, while Paula former partner, Bea González, would team up with Lucia.

On the men's side, the only top-four pair to remain together would be the number one ranked pair, with Fernando Belasteguín joining Sanyo Gutiérrez, while Belasteguín's partner, Agustín Tapia, would team up with Pablo Lima (who did not compete in this tournament due to an injury sustained in the last tournament). By choosing to separate from Lima, Paquito Navarro, would form a pair with Martín Di Nenno.

== Head-to-head record between teams ranked in the top 4 during the season ==
=== Men's ===
Record	Galán–Lebrón	Belasteguín–Tapia	Sanyo–Stupaczuk	Lima–Paquito	Former Pairs	Díaz–Maxi
Galán–Lebrón	—	2–2	6–0	1–1		1–0
Belasteguín–Tapia	2–2	—	1–3	1–0		0–1
Sanyo–Stupaczuk	0–6	3–1	—	3–0		1–0
Lima–Paquito	1–1	0–1	0–3	—		1–0
Former Pairs
Díaz–Maxi	0–1	0–1	1–0	0–1		—

=== Women's ===
Record	Gemma–Lucia	Ariana–Salazar	Bea–Josemaria	Marrero–Ortega	Former Pairs	Majo–Mapi	Delfina–Nogueira	Josemaria–Marrero	Bea–Ortega
Gemma–Lucia	—	4–2	1–0	2–0		1–1	1–0	2–2	2–0
Ariana–Salazar	2–4	—	—	—		2–0	1–0	1–1	1–1
Marrero–Ortega	0–1	—	—	—		1–1	—	—	—
Bea–Josemaria	0–2	—	—	—		1–0	—	—	—
Former Pairs
Majo–Mapi	1–1	0–2	1–1	0–1		—	1–0	2–2	1–2
Delfina–Nogueira	0–1	0–1	—	—		0–1	—	—	0–1
Josemaria–Marrero	2–2	1–1	—	—		2–2	—	—	1–0
Bea–Ortega	0–2	1–1	—	—		2–1	1–0	0–1	—

== Draws ==
=== Men's Bracket ===
Quarter-Final
1	(Spain) Galán / (Spain) Lebrón	6	6
6	(Spain) J. Ruiz / (Spain) U. Botello	3	1
7	(Argentina) Di Nenno / (Argentina) Maxi	6	3	6
4	(Argentina) Chingotto / (Argentina) J. Tello	4	6	2
3	(Argentina) Belasteguín / (Argentina) Tapia	6	6
5	(Spain) J. Rico / (Spain) Paquito	4	3
8	(Argentina) A. Silingo / (Spain) M. Díaz	1	7	3
2	(Argentina) Sanyo / (Argentina) Stupaczuk	6	6	6

Semi-Finals
1	(Spain) Galán / (Spain) Lebrón	6	6
7	(Argentina) Di Nenno / (Argentina) Maxi	3	4
3	(Argentina) Belasteguín / (Argentina) Tapia	6	1	4
2	(Argentina) Sanyo / (Argentina) Stupaczuk	3	6	6

Finals
1	(Spain) Galán / (Spain) Lebrón	3	6
3	(Argentina) Belasteguín / (Argentina) Tapia	6	7

=== Women's Bracket ===
Quarter-Final
1	(Spain) Gemma / (Spain) L. Sainz	6	6
7	(Argentina) A. Osoro / (Spain) C. Navarro	0	3
8	(Portugal) S. Araújo / (Argentina) V. Riera	7	2	1
4	(Spain) M. Marrero / (Spain) M. Ortega	5	6	6
3	(Spain) Bea González / (Spain) P. Josemaria	2	6
6	(Spain) E. Amatriain / (Spain) P. Llaguno	6	7
5	(Spain) Majo / (Spain) Mapi	5	6	4
2	(Spain) Ariana / (Spain) Salazar	7	4	6

Semi-Finals
1	(Spain) Gemma / (Spain) L. Sainz	6	6
4	(Spain) M. Marrero / (Spain) M. Ortega	1	4
6	(Spain) E. Amatriain / (Spain) P. Llaguno	7	6	1
2	(Spain) Ariana / (Spain) Salazar	5	7	6

Finals
1	(Spain) Gemma / (Spain) L. Sainz	6	6
2	(Spain) Ariana / (Spain) Salazar	4	3

== Results ==
=== Quarter-Finals ===
Men's
Date	Winners	Score	Opponent	Ref.
10/12/2020	(Spain) Alejandro Galán (Spain) Juan Lebrón	6–3 / 6–1	(Spain) Javi Ruiz (Spain) Uri Botello	
10/12/2020	(Argentina) Martín Di Nenno (Argentina) Maxi Sánchez	6–4 / 3–6 / 6–2	(Argentina) Federico Chingotto (Argentina) Juan Tello	
11/12/2020	(Argentina) Agustín Tapia (Argentina) Fernando Belasteguín	6–4 / 6–3	(Spain) Javier Rico (Spain) Paquito Navarro	
11/12/2020	(Argentina) Franco Stupaczuk (Argentina) Sanyo Gutiérrez	6–1 / 6–7 / 6–3	(Argentina) Agustin Gomez Silingo (Spain) Matías Díaz	

Women's
Date	Winners	Score	Opponent	Ref.
10/12/2020	(Spain) Gemma Triay (Spain) Lucia Sainz	6–0 / 6–3	(Argentina) Aranzazu Osoro (Spain) Carolina Navarro	
10/12/2020	(Spain) Marta Marrero (Spain) Marta Ortega	5–7 / 6–2 / 6–1	(Portugal) Sofia Araújo (Argentina) Virginia Riera	
11/12/2020	(Spain) Elisabeth Amatriain (Spain) Patricia Llaguno	6–2 / 7–6	(Spain) Bea González (Spain) Paula Josemaria	
11/12/2020	(Spain) Alejandra Salazar (Spain) Ariana Sánchez	7–5 / 4–6 / 6–4	(Spain) Majo Sánchez (Spain) Mapi Sánchez	

=== Semi-Finals ===
Men's
Date	Winners	Score	Opponent	Ref.
12/11/2020	(Spain) Alejandro Galán (Spain) Juan Lebrón	6–3 / 6–4	(Argentina) Martín Di Nenno (Argentina) Maxi Sánchez	
12/11/2020	(Argentina) Agustín Tapia (Argentina) Fernando Belasteguín	3–6 / 6–1 / 6–4	(Argentina) Franco Stupaczuk (Argentina) Sanyo Gutiérrez	

Women's
Date	Winners	Score	Opponent	Ref.
12/11/2020	(Spain) Gemma Triay (Spain) Lucia Sainz	6–1 / 6–4	(Spain) Marta Marrero (Spain) Marta Ortega	
12/11/2020	(Spain) Alejandra Salazar (Spain) Ariana Sánchez	5–7 / 7–6 / 6–1	(Spain) Elisabeth Amatriain (Spain) Patricia Llaguno	

=== Finals ===
Men's
Date	Winners	Score	Opponent	Ref.
13/11/2020	(Argentina) Agustín Tapia (Argentina) Fernando Belasteguín	6–3 / 7–6	(Spain) Alejandro Galán (Spain) Juan Lebrón	

Women's
Date	Winners	Score	Opponent	Ref.
13/11/2020	(Spain) Gemma Triay (Spain) Lucia Sainz	6–4 / 6–3	(Spain) Alejandra Salazar (Spain) Ariana Sánchez	
