= Gemma Triay =

Spanish padel player (born 1992)

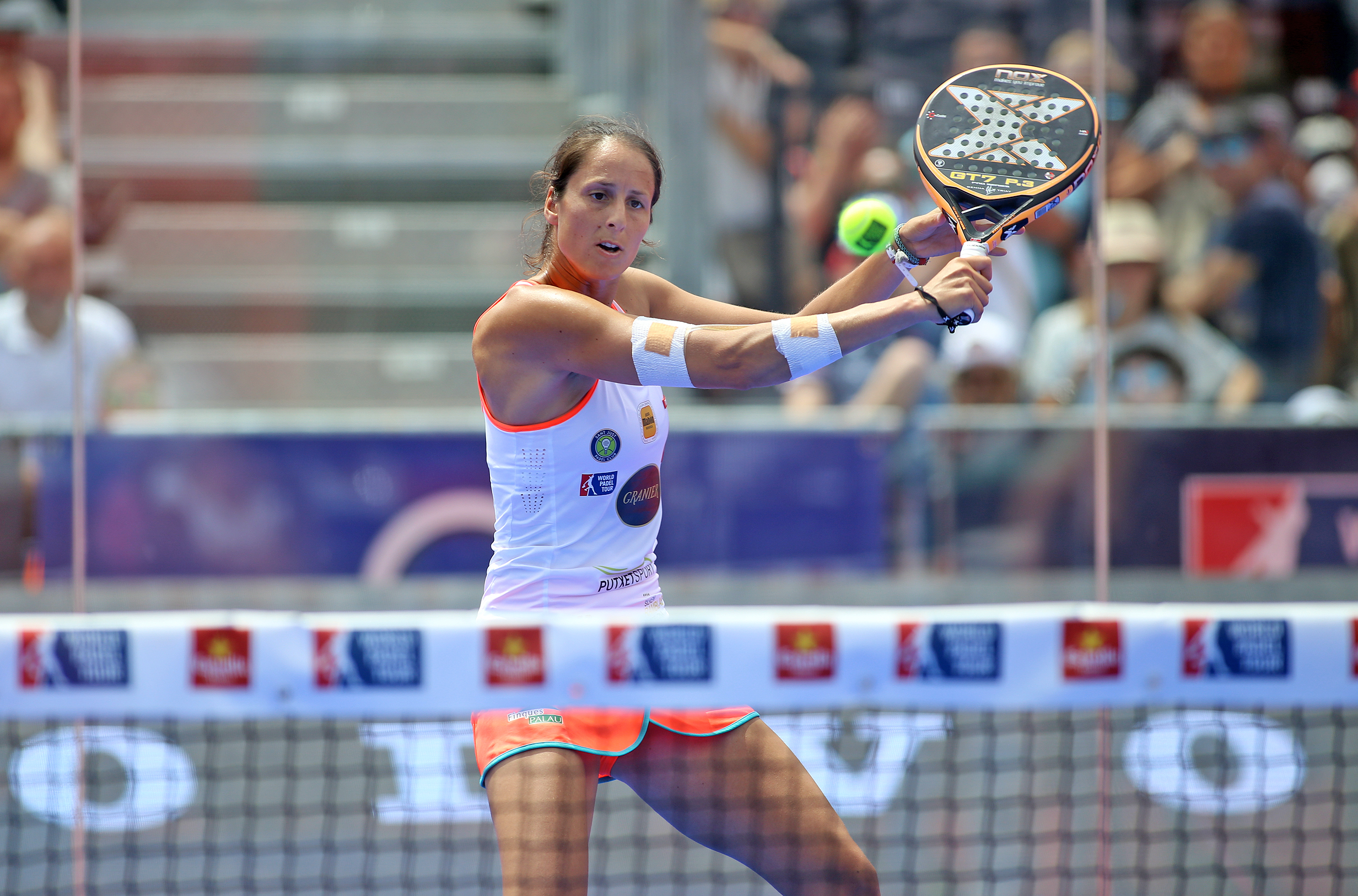

Personal information
- Full name: Gemma Triay Pons
- Born: 28 June 1992 (age 34) Alaior, Menorca, Spain
- Height: 1.73 m (5 ft 8 in)

Sport
- Country: Spain
- Sport: Pádel
- Position: Revés (left-side)
- Rank: 1st (PP)
- Partner: Delfina Brea
- Coached by: Sebastián Nerone, David Clavero

Achievements and titles
- Highest world ranking: 1st (2020, 2021, 2022, 2025)
- Updated on 21 August 2026

Gemma Triay Pons (born 28 June 1992) is a Spanish professional padel player from the island of Menorca. She has been the world's top-ranked woman in four seasons and, as of July 2026, heads the International Padel Federation (FIP) ranking alongside her Argentine partner Delfina Brea.

Triay finished as year-end number one on the World Padel Tour in 2020 with Lucía Sainz and in 2021 and 2022 with Alejandra Salazar. The third of those made her the first woman to top the circuit in three consecutive seasons. After the women's game moved to the Premier Padel circuit, she returned to the top of the ranking in 2025 with Brea and closed the season as number one for a fourth time.

== Early life ==
Triay grew up in Alaior, in the interior of Menorca, and began her sporting career at the town's tennis club. Her official FIP profile lists her place of birth as Mahón, the island's capital.

An injury ended her tennis career, and she came to padel almost without looking for it, beginning to compete in 2013. She has said that the sport gave her a second chance to make a living from competition.

== Career ==
=== 2016 ===
In 2016, Triay formed a partnership with the Catalan player Lucía Sainz, who switched to the right-hand side of the court to accommodate her.

After four tournaments with modest results, the pair reached their first finals at the Barcelona Challenger (a secondary tournament) and subsequently the Valladolid Open, losing the latter to the twins Majo & Mapi Sánchez.

They would reach another final during the season, at the Seville Open, where they lost to the world number ones, Alejandra Salazar & Marta Marrero. They also won the Spanish national championship, beating the top-seeded twins Majo & Mapi Sánchez in the final.

==== 2017 ====
In 2017, they began the season on an upward trajectory, reaching the quarterfinals in the first tournament, the semifinals in the second, and the final at the Barcelona Master, where they lost to the twins Majo & Mapi.

After five tournaments, during which they reached four semifinals, Gemma and Lucia claimed their first WPT trophy as a team at the tenth tournament of the season, defeating Catalina Tenorio & Marta Marrero in the Granada Open final. They repeated this success at the following tournament by winning the Zaragoza Open.

They would end the season by reaching the final of the Bilbao Open and the quarterfinals of the Master Final, finishing as the second-ranked pair and ranked fourth individually.

==== 2018 ====
In their third season as a team, Gemma and Lucia got off to a strong start, reaching four finals in their first five tournaments. They won the Catalunya Master, the Zaragoza and Valladolid Opens, and finished as runners-up at the Jaén Open.

After four tournaments without reaching the finals, they faced twins Mapi & Majo in the Portugal Master final, where they were defeated. In the season's final six tournaments, they reached another final at the Granada Open, winning their fourth title of the year against Ariana Sánchez & Marta Ortega, and finished the year ranked third as a pair and fifth individually.

==== 2019 ====
After a slow start to the season, their first final appearance came at the Vigo Open , the fourth tournament of the season, where they faced and lost to Marta Marrero & Marta Ortega in the championship match.

Following a run of nine tournaments in which they reached five semifinals without winning any, Gemma and Lucía won their first and only tournament of the season at the Santander WOpen.

Based on these results, along with those from the following two tournaments, they finished the year ranked fourth as a pair and eighth in the individual rankings.

==== 2020 ====
Despite dropping one spot in the rankings as a pair in each of the three seasons, Gemma and Lucia chose to continue playing together for a fifth consecutive year.

In the first five tournaments of the season, they reached three semifinals but made it to the final only once, where they were defeated by Alejandra Salazar & Ariana Sánchez.

However, their results improved in the second half of the season, as they reached the finals of the remaining six tournaments. They defeated Marta Marrero & Paula Josemaría in the Sardegna Open final; Mapi & Majo at the Barcelona Master; Marta Marrero & Marta Ortega at the Alicante Open; and Bea González & Paula Josemaría at the Las Rozas Open, losing only the Menorca Open final to Alejandra Salazar & Ariana Sánchez.

They avenged the loss to Alejandra & Ariana in the Master Final, allowing them to finish the season as the world number ones for the first time.

=== Partnership with Alejandra Salazar ===
==== 2021 ====
Surprisingly, despite finishing the year as world number ones, Gemma opted not to continue with Lucía Sainz, choosing Alejandra Salazar for the 2021 season and forming a partnership nicknamed "Triazar."

Despite starting with a loss in the season's first tournament, they reached four finals in the next six events, losing the Vigo and Valencia Opens, but defeating Ariana Sánchez & Paula Josemaría (who would be their main rivals throughout the season) at the Alicante Open and the Valladolid Master. They would wrap up the first half of the season by winning the Málaga Open, having reached five finals and won three out of nine tournaments.

They would begin the second half of the season with a quarter-final loss at the Portugal Master. That defeat was redeemed by winning the next five tournaments, lifting trophies in Sardinia, Barcelona, Lugo, Menorca, and Córdoba, defeating their rivals Ariana & Paula in the first and last of these.

Despite failing to reach the finals of the season's last two tournaments, their earlier results were enough for Alejandra and Gemma to be crowned world number ones in Córdoba, finishing the year with a lead of over 1,000 points over the next pair.

==== 2022 ====
In 2022, Alejandra and Gemma started the season strong, reaching the finals of the first five tournaments and winning four of them. In Miami, Reus, Vigo, and Alicante, they faced Ariana Sánchez & Paula Josemaría, their main rivals that season, losing only in Vigo. The only tournament they won without facing them was th Brussels Open.

In the next two tournaments, they failed to reach the finals, a feat they would achieved in the five tournaments leading up to the summer break. At the Vienna and Málaga Opens, they lost to Ariana & Paula. However, they defeated them at the French Open and the Valladolid Master, while also winning the Valencia Open against Delfina Brea and Tamara Icardo.

In the first four tournaments following the summer break, the world number ones returned in inconsistent form, reaching only the final in Sweden, where they lost to Ariana and Paula, which allowed their rivals to take the top spot in the rankings. However, their performance improved over the next four tournaments, as they defeated their rivals in the finals of the Santander, Menorca, Malmö, and Mexico Opens.

Having won the last four tournaments, Salazar & Triaya and Ariana & Paula headed into the Master Final, the season's final event, with the top ranking still up for grabs. Alejandra & Gemma's victory in the final secured the first ranking spot, allowing Gemma to finish the season as world number one for the third consecutive year.

==== 2023 ====
In the first 10 tournaments of the season (including two secondary Challengers), Alejandra and Gemma reached nine finals, facing Ariana & Paula in six of them. Despite losing the final of the inaugural tournament, they went on to win consecutively in La Rioja, Chile, and Paraguay. However, losses to their main rivals followed in Reus (Challenger), Granada, Brussels and Vigo, allowed Ariana Sánchez & Paula Josemaría to rise to the number one ranking in Granada. They would wrap the first 10 tournaments with a loss in the finals of the Danish Open.

After two semifinals losses in two more tournaments, Gemma joined forces with Marta Ortega following Alejandra Salazar's forced hiatus due to an elbow injury. After Salazar recovered, Gemma chose to end the partnership, concluding their run with 23 titles and 34 finals appearances across 54 tournaments, also setting a record of twelve titles in a single season.

=== Partnership with Marta Ortega ===
Triay began playing with Marta Ortega at the French Open, where they reached the semifinals. Their first finals came at the following tournaments in Valladolid and Valencia, and they secured their first trophy at the Italy Major by defeating Bea González & Delfina Brea in the final, making Ortega and Triay the first female champions in Premier Padel.

After a semifinal exit at the Madrid P1 and finshing runners-up at the Paris Major, upon returning to the WPT they reached three more finals in four tournaments, in Málaga, Madrid, and Germany, losing all three to Ariana & Paula.

In the final six tournaments of 2023 (including Premier Padel's Milan P1), Gemma and Marta reached only the Menorca Open final, which they won by defeating Ariana & Paula.

Their final tournament together would be the inaugural 2024 event of Premier Padel, now as the main circuit, where, unusually, they would part ways after the season's first tournament.

=== Partnership with Claudia Fernández ===
==== 2024 ====
The one chosen to be her partner in 2024 was the young Claudia Fernández. In their very first tournament together, they reached the final of the Qatar Major but were unable to overcome Ariana & Paula. They would reach the finals again, two tournaments later, making it to the title matches of the season's fifth and seventh tournaments, which they lost to Bea González and Delfina Brea in Brussels and Asunción.

After a semifinal defeat in Argentina, Claudia and Gemma would finally achieve glory by winning the Santiago P1 and the Bordeaux P2. In the last four tournaments before the summer break, they would reach another final in Málaga.

The pair returned strong from the summer break, reaching every final in September, winning in Madrid and Valladolid, and finishing as runners-up in Rotterdam. This run of finals was interrupted by three consecutive semifinal losses, followed by the best stretch of the season, during which they finished as runners-up at the Kuwait P1 and the Premier Padel Finals, but went on to win the Mexico Major (becoming the first player to take a Major with two different partners) and the Milan P1, closing the season with sixth title won.

=== Partnership with Delfina Brea ===
==== 2025 ====
For 2025, she chose to part ways with Claudia and team up with Delfina Brea, aiming to reclaim the world number one spot. At the season's opening tournament in Riyadh, they were defeated in the semifinals by their former partners, Bea González & Claudia Fernández. However, they improved rapidly, reaching seven consecutive finals (five of them against their main rivals) and winning tournaments in Gijón, Cancún, Miami, and Qatar, while tying in Chile and losing in Brussels and Asunción, managing to reclaim the world number one ranking 771 days after Sánchez and Josemaría had taken the position from her at the World Padel Tour's 2023 Granada Open.

They would experience ups and downs over the next five tournaments, and Gemma (individually) would assume and lose the N.1 ranking spot. However, with their victory at the Italy Major, they headed into the final tournament before the summer break with a chance to claim the top spot. By defeating Ariana Sánchez & Paula Josemaria in the final of the Tarragona P1, Delfina and Gemma became the world's number one pair.

Upon returning from the summer break, they would lose again to their former partners in the Madrid P1 final, but they bounced back to win the Paris Major, the Germany P2, and the Rotterdam P1, reaching a total of 9 titles won and 13 finals played across 18 tournaments.

After two tournaments without reaching a final, Gemma and Delfina went on to reach four consecutive finals, winning none of them, first losing the FIP Pairs World Cup to Ariana & Paula, and the Dubai, Mexico, and Premier Padel Finals to Bea & Claudia. Despite failing to win any of these six tournaments, reaching the final in Mexico ensured they would finish the season as the world No. 1s.

==== 2026 ====
In 2026, the Spanish-Argentine duo began the year by reaching three finals. They lost the first to Andrea Ustero & Ariana Sánchez, but bounced back in Gijón and went on to defeat Bea González & Paula Josemaría in the Cancún final.

However, the good moment was followed by a streak of five consecutive final losses against Bea & Paula in Miami, Giza, Brussels, Asunción, and Buenos Aires. Although they won the Italy Major, losses in the finals of the Valladolid and Bordeaux P2's began to raise doubts about their ability to retain the world number one ranking.

Delfina and Gemma would close out the first half of the season by winning the Málaga and Pretoria P1s, and reaching the final of the London P1, managing to maintain a lead of over 4,000 points over their rivals.

== National team ==
Triay was a member of the Spanish squad at the 2016 World Padel Championship in Cascais, Portugal, where the women's team retained its title for a second consecutive championship.

At the 2021 championship in Doha she and Salazar beat Claudia Jensen and Silvana Campus 6–2, 6–0 as Spain won a seventh women's team title. A year later in Dubai the same pairing delivered the decisive point of the final, beating Julieta Bidahorria and Virginia Riera 6–1, 6–2 for an eighth title. In 2024, again in Doha, she opened the final alongside Claudia Fernández on the way to Spain's ninth women's world title and a sixth in a row.

== Honours ==
=== World Padel Tour (2013–2023) ===
Winner Runner-up

==== Finals ====
N.º	Date	Tournament	Partner	Result	Opponents in the final	Career title No.
2016
1.	3 July 2016	(Spain) Barcelona Challenger	(Spain) Lucía Sainz	6–3 / 4–6 / 6–7	(Spain) Catalina Tenorio (Spain) Victoria Iglesias	
2.	10 July 2016	(Spain) Valladolid Open	(Spain) Lucía Sainz	1–6 / 1–6	(Spain) Mapi Sánchez (Spain) Majo Sánchez	
3.	25 September 2016	(Spain) Seville Open	(Spain) Lucía Sainz	3–6 / 5–7	(Spain) Alejandra Salazar (Spain) Marta Marrero	
2017
4.	4 June 2017	(Spain) Barcelona Master	(Spain) Lucía Sainz	4–6 / 6–3 / 1–6	(Spain) Mapi Sánchez (Spain) Majo Sánchez	
5.	15 October 2017	(Spain) Granada Open	(Spain) Lucía Sainz	6–2 / 6–4	(Argentina) Catalina Tenorio (Spain) Marta Marrero	1st
6.	29 October 2017	(Spain) Zaragoza Open	(Spain) Lucía Sainz	6–4 / 3–6 / 7–5	(Spain) Elisabeth Amatriain (Spain) Patricia Llaguno	2nd
7.	26 November 2017	(Spain) Euskadi Open	(Spain) Lucía Sainz	3–6 / 3–6	(Spain) Mapi Sánchez (Spain) Majo Sánchez	
2018
8.	25 March 2018	(Spain) Catalunya Master	(Spain) Lucía Sainz	6–2 / 5–7 / 6–4	(Spain) Alejandra Salazar (Spain) Marta Marrero	3rd
9.	6 May 2018	(Spain) Zaragoza Open	(Spain) Lucía Sainz	6–7 / 7–6 / 6–1	(Spain) Mapi Sánchez (Spain) Majo Sánchez	4th
10.	27 May 2018	(Spain) Jaén Open	(Spain) Lucía Sainz	5–7 / 3–6	(Spain) Mapi Sánchez (Spain) Majo Sánchez	
11.	24 June 2018	(Spain) Valladolid Open	(Spain) Lucía Sainz	6–4 / 4–6 / 6–3	(Spain) Mapi Sánchez (Spain) Majo Sánchez	5th
12.	23 September 2018	Portugal Master	(Spain) Lucía Sainz	6–0 / 4–6 / 5–7	(Spain) Mapi Sánchez (Spain) Majo Sánchez	
13.	14 October 2018	(Spain) Granada Open	(Spain) Lucía Sainz	6–1 / 6–4	(Spain) Ariana Sánchez (Spain) Marta Ortega	6th
2019
14.	12 May 2019	(Spain) Vigo Open	(Spain) Lucía Sainz	2–6 / 2–6	(Spain) Marta Marrero (Spain) Marta Ortega	
15.	3 November 2019	(Spain) Santander WOpen	(Spain) Lucía Sainz	6–2 / 6–7 / 6–4	(Spain) Mapi Sánchez (Spain) Majo Sánchez	7th
2020
16.	5 July 2020	(Spain) Estrella Damm Open	(Spain) Lucía Sainz	2–6 / 3–6	(Spain) Alejandra Salazar (Spain) Ariana Sánchez	
17.	13 September 2020	(Italy) Sardegna Open	(Spain) Lucía Sainz	6–0 / 6–7 / 7–6	(Spain) Marta Marrero (Spain) Paula Josemaría	8th
18.	27 September 2020	(Spain) Menorca Open	(Spain) Lucía Sainz	6–3 / 1–6 / 2–6	(Spain) Alejandra Salazar (Spain) Ariana Sánchez	
19.	18 October 2020	(Spain) Barcelona Master	(Spain) Lucía Sainz	6–2 / 6–3	(Spain) Mapi Sánchez (Spain) Majo Sánchez	9th
20.	8 November 2020	(Spain) Alicante Open	(Spain) Lucía Sainz	2–6 / 7–6 / 6–3	(Spain) Marta Marrero (Spain) Marta Ortega	10th
21.	22 November 2020	(Spain) Las Rozas Open	(Spain) Lucía Sainz	6–0 / 7–6	(Spain) Bea González (Spain) Paula Josemaría	11th
22.	13 December 2020	(Spain) Master Final	(Spain) Lucía Sainz	6–4 / 6–3	(Spain) Alejandra Salazar (Spain) Ariana Sánchez	12th
2021
23.	25 April 2021	(Spain) Alicante Open	(Spain) Alejandra Salazar	6–0 / 6–1	(Spain) Ariana Sánchez (Spain) Paula Josemaría	13th
24.	9 May 2021	(Spain) Vigo Open	(Spain) Alejandra Salazar	6–2 / 3–6 / 5–7	(Spain) Patricia Llaguno (Argentina) Virginia Riera	
25.	27 June 2021	(Spain) Valladolid Master	(Spain) Alejandra Salazar	6–3 / 6–3	(Spain) Ariana Sánchez (Spain) Paula Josemaría	14th
26.	11 July 2021	(Spain) Valencia Open	(Spain) Alejandra Salazar	7–6 / 1–6 / 4–6	(Argentina) Delfina Brea (Spain) Tamara Icardo	
27.	8 August 2021	(Spain) Málaga Open	(Spain) Alejandra Salazar	7–5 / 6–2	(Argentina) Delfina Brea (Spain) Tamara Icardo	15th
28.	11 September 2021	(Italy) Sardinia Open	(Spain) Alejandra Salazar	6–7 / 6–3 / 6–1	(Spain) Ariana Sánchez (Spain) Paula Josemaría	16th
29.	19 September 2021	(Spain) Barcelona Master	(Spain) Alejandra Salazar	6–1 / 6–2	(Spain) Bea González (Spain) Lucía Sainz	17th
30.	26 September 2021	(Spain) Lugo Open	(Spain) Alejandra Salazar	6–1 / 6–4	(Spain) Patricia Llaguno (Argentina) Virginia Riera	18th
31.	10 October 2021	(Spain) Menorca Open	(Spain) Alejandra Salazar	4–6 / 6–4 / 6–3	(Spain) Marta Marrero (Spain) Lucía Sainz	19th
32.	24 October 2021	(Spain) Córdoba Open	(Spain) Alejandra Salazar	6–7 / 6–4 / 6–4	(Spain) Ariana Sánchez (Spain) Paula Josemaría	20th
2022
33.	27 February 2022	(United States) Miami Open	(Spain) Alejandra Salazar	6–2 / 6–2	(Spain) Ariana Sánchez (Spain) Paula Josemaría	21st
34.	13 March 2022	(Spain) Reus Open	(Spain) Alejandra Salazar	6–3 / 6–7 / 6–1	(Spain) Ariana Sánchez (Spain) Paula Josemaría	22nd
35.	27 March 2022	(Spain) Vigo Open	(Spain) Alejandra Salazar	5–7 / 3–6	(Spain) Ariana Sánchez (Spain) Paula Josemaría	
36.	10 April 2022	(Spain) Alicante Open	(Spain) Alejandra Salazar	6–2 / 3–6 / 6–4	(Spain) Ariana Sánchez (Spain) Paula Josemaría	23rd
37.	8 May 2022	(Belgium) Brussels Open	(Spain) Alejandra Salazar	4–6 / 6–3 / 6–0	(Spain) Patricia Llaguno (Argentina) Virginia Riera	24th
38.	12 June 2022	(Austria) Vienna Open	(Spain) Alejandra Salazar	6–4 / 4–6 / 3–6	(Spain) Ariana Sánchez (Spain) Paula Josemaría	
39.	19 June 2022	(France) French Open	(Spain) Alejandra Salazar	7–6 / 6–4	(Spain) Ariana Sánchez (Spain) Paula Josemaría	25th
40.	26 June 2022	(Spain) Valladolid Master	(Spain) Alejandra Salazar	6–3 / 3–6 / 6–0	(Spain) Ariana Sánchez (Spain) Paula Josemaría	26th
41.	10 July 2022	(Spain) Valencia Open	(Spain) Alejandra Salazar	6–4 / 4–6 / 7–6	(Argentina) Delfina Brea (Spain) Tamara Icardo	27th
42.	24 July 2022	(Spain) Málaga Open	(Spain) Alejandra Salazar	3–6 / 3–6	(Spain) Ariana Sánchez (Spain) Paula Josemaría	
43.	18 September 2022	(Sweden) Swedish Open	(Spain) Alejandra Salazar	1–6 / 1–6	(Spain) Ariana Sánchez (Spain) Paula Josemaría	
44.	9 October 2022	(Spain) Santander Open	(Spain) Alejandra Salazar	6–2 / 6–1	(Spain) Ariana Sánchez (Spain) Paula Josemaría	28th
45.	23 October 2022	(Spain) Menorca Open	(Spain) Alejandra Salazar	6–1 / 7–5	(Spain) Ariana Sánchez (Spain) Paula Josemaría	29th
46.	13 November 2022	(Sweden) Malmö Open	(Spain) Alejandra Salazar	6–4 / 7–5	(Spain) Ariana Sánchez (Spain) Paula Josemaría	30th
47.	27 November 2022	Mexico Open	(Spain) Alejandra Salazar	6–3 / 7–6	(Spain) Ariana Sánchez (Spain) Paula Josemaría	31st
48.	18 December 2022	(Spain) Master Final	(Spain) Alejandra Salazar	3–6 / 6–4 / 6–4	(Spain) Ariana Sánchez (Spain) Paula Josemaría	32nd
2023
49.	26 February 2023	(United Arab Emirates) Abu Dhabi Master	(Spain) Alejandra Salazar	6–3 / 6–3	(Spain) Ariana Sánchez (Spain) Paula Josemaría	
50.	12 March 2023	(Argentina) 2023 La Rioja Open 1000	(Spain) Alejandra Salazar	6–7 / 6–4 / 6–1	(Spain) Bea González (Spain) Marta Ortega	33rd
51.	19 March 2023	Chile Open 1000	(Spain) Alejandra Salazar	6–1 / 1–0 / WO	(Argentina) Claudia Jensen (Spain) Jessica Castelló	34th
52.	26 March 2023	Paraguay Open 1000	(Spain) Alejandra Salazar	7–6 / 7–6	(Spain) Ariana Sánchez (Spain) Paula Josemaría	35th
53.	2 April 2023	(Spain) Reus Open 500	(Spain) Alejandra Salazar	3–6 / 2–6	(Spain) Ariana Sánchez (Spain) Paula Josemaría	
54.	16 April 2023	(Spain) Granada Open 1000	(Spain) Alejandra Salazar	2–6 / 6–7	(Spain) Ariana Sánchez (Spain) Paula Josemaría	
55.	30 April 2023	(Belgium) Brussels Open 1000	(Spain) Alejandra Salazar	7–6 / 3–6 / 5–7	(Spain) Ariana Sánchez (Spain) Paula Josemaría	
56.	14 May 2023	(Spain) Vigo Open 1000	(Spain) Alejandra Salazar	2–6 / 3–6	(Spain) Ariana Sánchez (Spain) Paula Josemaría	
57.	21 May 2023	(Denmark) Danish Open 1000	(Spain) Alejandra Salazar	2–6 / 6–3 / 4–6	(Spain) Bea González (Argentina) Delfina Brea	
58.	25 June 2023	(Spain) Valladolid Master	(Spain) Marta Ortega	2–6 / 7–5 / 2–6	(Spain) Bea González (Argentina) Delfina Brea	
59.	9 July 2023	(Spain) Valencia Open 1000	(Spain) Marta Ortega	3–6 / 1–6	(Spain) Ariana Sánchez (Spain) Paula Josemaría	
60.	30 July 2023	(Spain) Málaga Open 1000	(Spain) Marta Ortega	4–6 / 3–6	(Spain) Ariana Sánchez (Spain) Paula Josemaría	
61.	24 September 2023	(Spain) Madrid Master	(Spain) Marta Ortega	3–6 / 6–7<brx	(Spain) Ariana Sánchez (Spain) Paula Josemaría	
62.	1 October 2023	Germany Open 1000	(Spain) Marta Ortega	3–6 / 6–7	(Spain) Ariana Sánchez (Spain) Paula Josemaría	
63.	22 October 2023	(Spain) Menorca Open 1000	(Spain) Marta Ortega	6–4 / 4–6 / 6–4	(Spain) Ariana Sánchez (Spain) Paula Josemaría	36th

Tournaments won	Challenger	Open	Master	Master Final	Total
Tournaments won	0	29	5	2	36

=== Premier Padel (2022–Present) ===
Winner Runner-up

==== Finals ====
N.º	Date	Tournament	Partner	Result	Opponents in the final	Career title No.
2023
64.	16 July 2023	Italy Major	(Spain) Marta Ortega	6–3 / 3–6 / 7–5	(Spain) Bea González (Argentina) Delfina Brea	37th
65.	10 September 2023	(France) Paris Major	(Spain) Marta Ortega	2–6 / 4–6	(Spain) Ariana Sánchez (Spain) Paula Josemaría	
2024
66.	8 March 2024	Qatar Major	(Spain) Claudia Fernández	3–6 / 1–6	(Spain) Ariana Sánchez (Spain) Paula Josemaría	
67.	28 April 2024	(Belgium) Brussels P2	(Spain) Claudia Fernández	4–6 / 4–6	(Spain) Bea González (Argentina) Delfina Brea	
68.	19 May 2024	(Paraguay) Asunción P2	(Spain) Claudia Fernández	3–6 / 5–7	(Spain) Bea González (Argentina) Delfina Brea	
69.	3 June 2024	(Chile) Santiago P1	(Spain) Claudia Fernández	6–1 / 6–4	(Spain) Lucía Sainz (Spain) Patricia Llaguno	38th
70.	16 June 2024	(France) Bordeaux P2	(Spain) Claudia Fernández	7–5 / 7–5	(Spain) Marta Ortega (Spain) Verónica Virseda	39th
71.	14 July 2024	(Spain) Málaga P1	(Spain) Claudia Fernández	6–1 / 4–6 / 2–6	(Spain) Ariana Sánchez (Spain) Paula Josemaría	
72.	8 September 2024	(Spain) Madrid P1	(Spain) Claudia Fernández	6–2 / 2–1 / W.O.	(Spain) Bea González (Argentina) Delfina Brea	40th
73.	15 September 2024	(Netherlands) Rotterdam P1	(Spain) Claudia Fernández	4–6 / 4–6	(Spain) Ariana Sánchez (Spain) Paula Josemaría	
74.	22 September 2024	(Spain) Valladolid P2	(Spain) Claudia Fernández	6–3 / 6–2	(Spain) Ariana Sánchez (Spain) Paula Josemaría	41st
75.	17 November 2024	Kuwait P1	(Spain) Claudia Fernández	5–7 / 6–7	(Spain) Ariana Sánchez (Spain) Paula Josemaría	
76.	1 December 2024	Mexico Major	(Spain) Claudia Fernández	6–7 / 6–1 / 6–4	(Spain) Marta Ortega (Portugal) Sofia Araujo	42nd
77.	8 December 2024	(Italy) Milan P1	(Spain) Claudia Fernández	6–7 / 5–2 / W.O.	(Spain) Bea González (Argentina) Delfina Brea	43rd
78.	22 December 2024	(Spain) Premier Padel Finals	(Spain) Claudia Fernández	3–6 / 3–6	(Spain) Ariana Sánchez (Spain) Paula Josemaría	
2025
79.	2 March 2025	(Spain) Gijón P2	(Argentina) Delfina Brea	0–6 / 6–1 / 6–4	(Spain) Ariana Sánchez (Spain) Paula Josemaría	44th
80.	16 March 2025	(Mexico) Cancún P2	(Argentina) Delfina Brea	6–3 / 6–1	(Spain) Marta Ortega (Portugal) Sofia Araujo	45th
81.	23 March 2025	(United States) Miami P1	(Argentina) Delfina Brea	2–6 / 6–1 / 6–4	(Spain) Ariana Sánchez (Spain) Paula Josemaría	46th
82.	30 March 2025	(Chile) Santiago P1	(Argentina) Delfina Brea	4–6 / 7–6 / Suspended	(Spain) Ariana Sánchez (Spain) Paula Josemaría	
83.	19 April 2025	Qatar Major	(Argentina) Delfina Brea	6–4 / 6–4	(Spain) Ariana Sánchez (Spain) Paula Josemaría	47th
84.	27 April 2025	(Belgium) Brussels P2	(Argentina) Delfina Brea	2–6 / 4–6	(Spain) Ariana Sánchez (Spain) Paula Josemaría	
85.	25 May 2025	(Paraguay) Asunción P2	(Argentina) Delfina Brea	6–7 / 6–3 / 2–6	(Spain) Bea González (Spain) Claudia Fernández	
86.	15 June 2025	Italy Major	(Argentina) Delfina Brea	6–4 / 6–4	(Spain) Ariana Sánchez (Spain) Paula Josemaría	48th
87.	3 August 2025	(Spain) Tarragona P1	(Argentina) Delfina Brea	7–6 / 6–4	(Spain) Ariana Sánchez (Spain) Paula Josemaría	49th
88.	7 September 2025	(Spain) Madrid P1	(Argentina) Delfina Brea	6–3 / 1–6 / 4–6	(Spain) Bea González (Spain) Claudia Fernández	
89.	14 September 2025	(France) Paris Major	(Argentina) Delfina Brea	7–5 / 6–2	(Spain) Marta Ortega (Spain) Tamara Icardo	50th
90.	28 September 2025	Germany P2	(Argentina) Delfina Brea	6–4 / 4–6 / 6–3	(Spain) Ariana Sánchez (Spain) Paula Josemaría	51st
91.	5 October 2025	(Netherlands) Rotterdam P1	(Argentina) Delfina Brea	6–2 / 3–6 / 6–4	(Spain) Ariana Sánchez (Spain) Paula Josemaría	52nd
92.	9 November 2025	(Kuwait) FIP Pairs World Cup	(Argentina) Delfina Brea	3–6 / 3–6	(Spain) Ariana Sánchez (Spain) Paula Josemaría	
93.	16 November 2025	(United Arab Emirates) Dubai P1	(Argentina) Delfina Brea	1–6 / 5–7	(Spain) Bea González (Spain) Claudia Fernández	
94.	30 November 2025	Mexico Major	(Argentina) Delfina Brea	2–6 / 4–6	(Spain) Bea González (Spain) Claudia Fernández	
95.	14 December 2025	(Spain) Premier Padel Finals	(Argentina) Delfina Brea	4–6 / 6–0 / 2–6	(Spain) Bea González (Spain) Claudia Fernández	
2026
96.	14 February 2026	(Saudi Arabia) Riyadh P1	(Argentina) Delfina Brea	6–3 / 1–6 / 4–6	(Spain) Ariana Sánchez (Spain) Andrea Ustero	
97.	8 March 2026	(Spain) Gijón P2	(Argentina) Delfina Brea	6–4 / 6–7 / 6–3	(Spain) Ariana Sánchez (Spain) Andrea Ustero	53rd
98.	22 March 2026	(Mexico) Cancún P2	(Argentina) Delfina Brea	7–3 / 6–1	(Spain) Bea González (Spain) Paula Josemaría	54th
99.	29 March 2026	(United States) Miami P1	(Argentina) Delfina Brea	3–6 / 6–4 / 5–7	(Spain) Bea González (Spain) Paula Josemaría	
100.	18 April 2026	(Egypt) Giza P2	(Argentina) Delfina Brea	4–6 / 7–5 / 4–6	(Spain) Bea González (Spain) Paula Josemaría	
101.	26 April 2026	(Belgium) Brussels P2	(Argentina) Delfina Brea	5–7 / 2–6	(Spain) Bea González (Spain) Paula Josemaría	
102.	10 May 2026	(Paraguay) Asunción	(Argentina) Delfina Brea	6–4 / 3–6 / 3–6	(Spain) Bea González (Spain) Paula Josemaría	
103.	17 May 2026	(Argentina) Buenos Aires P1	(Argentina) Delfina Brea	2–6 / 5–7	(Spain) Bea González (Spain) Paula Josemaría	
104.	7 June 2026	Italy Major	(Argentina) Delfina Brea	6–1 / 7–5	(Spain) Ariana Sánchez (Spain) Andrea Ustero	55th
105.	28 June 2026	(Spain) Valladolid P2	(Argentina) Delfina Brea	4–6 / 2–6	(Spain) Bea González (Spain) Paula Josemaría	
106.	5 August 2026	(France) Bordeaux P2	(Argentina) Delfina Brea	6–3 / 1–6 / 1–6	(Argentina) Claudia Jensen (Spain) Tamara Icardo	
107.	19 August 2026	(Spain) Málaga P1	(Argentina) Delfina Brea	7–5 / 3–6 / 7–6	(Spain) Bea González (Spain) Paula Josemaría	56th
108.	2 August 2026	(South Africa) Pretoria P1	(Argentina) Delfina Brea	6–2 / 6–7 / 7–6	(Spain) Claudia Fernandéz (Spain) Martina Calvo	57th
109.	9 August 2026	(United Kingdom) London P1	(Argentina) Delfina Brea	5–7 / 3–6	(Spain) Claudia Fernandéz (Spain) Martina Calvo	
110.	6 September 2026	(Spain) Madrid P1	(Argentina) Delfina Brea	6–7 / 6–3 / 6–3	(Spain) Bea González (Spain) Paula Josemaría	58th
111.	31 October 2026	Kuwait Major	(Argentina) Delfina Brea	6–3 / 1–6 / 1–6	(Spain) Ariana Sánchez (Spain) Andrea Ustero	59th

Tournaments won	P2	P1	Major	PP Finals	FIP World Cup	Total
Tournaments won	7	9	7	0	0	23
