= Lucía Sainz =

Spanish tennis and padel player

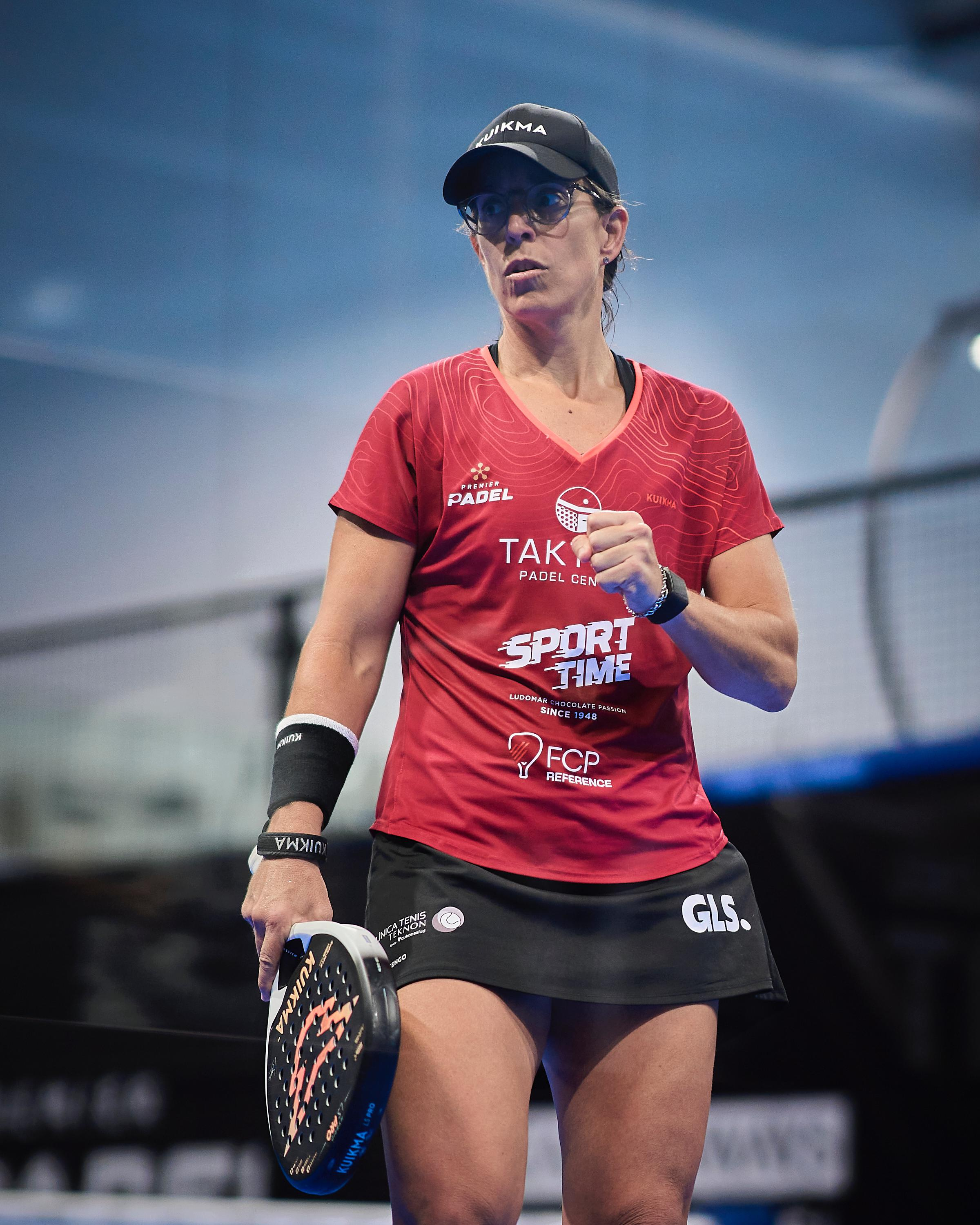
- Full name: Lucía Sainz Pelegri
- Country (sports): Spain
- Born: 5 October 1984 (age 40); Barcelona, Spain
- Plays: Right-handed (two-handed backhand)
- College: Fresno State Bulldogs
- Prize money: $11,048
- Official website: Official website

Singles
- Career record: 18-39
- Career titles: 0
- Highest ranking: No. 840 (25 May 2009)

Doubles
- Career record: 57-40
- Career titles: 6 ITF
- Highest ranking: No. 323 (3 August 2009)

Lucía Sainz Pelegri (born 5 October 1984) is a Spanish former professional tennis player and currently a professional padel player.

== Tennis career ==
She has won six doubles titles on the ITF Women's Circuit. She decided to follow the college route and was part of the Fresno State Bulldogs tennis team from 2004 to 2006. Fresno State's Lucia Sainz has been named the Western Athletic Conference Women's Tennis Player of the Week for the week of February 28. Sainz retired from professional tennis in 2009.

== Padel tennis career ==
Since 2015, she is a professional padel player where she has attained a world No. 1 ranking as of 2020. In 2018, she was awarded the Dona y Esport award as Barcelona's best athlete. She has been competing as a partner with Gemma Triay since 2016. Together with her, Sainz reached world No. 1 in 2020.
