= 2020 WPT Menorca Open =

World Padel Tour tournament held in Menorca, Spain

- Date: 20 – 27 September
- Edition: 2nd
- Category: Open
- Location: Menorca, Spain
- Venue: Pavelló Menorca

Champions
- Men's doubles: (Argentina) Franco Stupaczuk (Argentina) Sanyo Gutiérrez
- Women's doubles: (Spain) Alejandra Salazar (Spain) Ariana Sánchez

Chronology

The 2020 Menorca Open (officially 2020 World Padel Tour Estrella Damm Menorca Open) was the seventh tournament of the eight season organized by World Padel Tour, the most prestigious padel circuit at the time.

In the women's category, the first and fourth ranked pairs reached the final. The first finalists were the number one ranked pair, Alejandra Salazar and Ariana Sánchez, who defeated the fourth seeded pair, the twins Majo and Mapi Sánchez, to reach the final. Their opponents would be the winners of the previous tournament and number 4 ranked pair, Gemma Triay and Lucia Sainz, who defeated the third ranked pair, Bea González and Marta Ortega, in the semifinals. In the final, Ariana and Salazar defeated Gemma and Lucia in three sets, preventing Gemma from winning the title at home, and winning their third title of the season and their first in Menorca.

In the men's category, the winners of the last tournament also reached the final, this time for a match between the 3rd and 4th ranked pairs by FIP. The first finalists were the number three ranked pair, Agustín Tapia and Fernando Belasteguín, who eliminated the world number ones, Alejandro Galán and Juan Lebrón, in the semifinals. Their opponents were the number fourth ranked pair, Franco Stupaczuk and Sanyo Gutiérrez, who defeated the world's number two's, Pablo Lima and Paquito Navarro, to reach the final. In the championship match, Sanyo and Stupaczuk defeated Belasteguín and Tapia in two sets, winning their first title of the season, with Sanyo successfully defending the title won in the inaugural edition of the previous season.

== Head-to-head record between teams ranked in the top 4 during the season ==
=== Men's ===
| Record | Galán–Lebrón | Lima–Paquito | Belasteguín–Tapia | Sanyo–Stupaczuk | Former Pairs | Díaz–Maxi |
| Galán–Lebrón | — | 1–1 | 1–1 | 4–0 | | 1–0 |
| Lima–Paquito | 1–1 | — | 0–1 | 0–1 | | 1–0 |
| Belasteguín–Tapia | 1–1 | 1–0 | — | 0–3 | | 0–1 |
| Sanyo–Stupaczuk | 0–4 | 1–0 | 3–0 | — | | 1–0 |
Former Pairs
| Díaz–Maxi | 0–1 | 0–1 | 1–0 | 0–1 | | — |

=== Women's ===
| Record | Ariana–Salazar | Josemaria–Marrero | Bea–Ortega | Majo–Mapi | Former Pairs | Gemma–Lucia | Delfina–Nogueira |
| Ariana–Salazar | — | 1–1 | 1–1 | 2–0 | | 2–1 | 1–0 |
| Josemaria–Marrero | 1–1 | — | 1–0 | 2–1 | | 2–2 | — |
| Bea–Ortega | 1–1 | 0–1 | — | 2–1 | | 0–2 | 1–0 |
| Majo–Mapi | 0–2 | 1–2 | 1–2 | — | | 1–0 | 1–0 |
Former Pairs
| Gemma–Lucia | 1–2 | 2–2 | 2–0 | 0–1 | | — | 1–0 |
| Delfina–Nogueira | 0–1 | — | 0–1 | 0–1 | | 0–1 | — |

== Draws ==
=== Men's Bracket ===
Round of 32
1 | (Spain) Galán / (Spain) Lebrón
Bye
(Argentina) L. Capra / (Argentina) R. Moyano | 3 | 6 | 6
(Spain) N. Gadea / (Argentina) S. Nerone | 6 | 3 | 4
(Argentina) F. Quiles / (Spain) J. Garrido | 2 | 5
(Brazil) L. Bergamini / (Argentina) M. Lamperti | 6 | 7
(Spain) E. Moreno / (Spain) J. Rico | 2 | 3
7 | (Argentina) F. Chingotto / (Argentina) J. Tello | 6 | 6
6 | (Spain) J. Ruiz / (Spain) U. Botello | 2 | 6 | 2
(Spain) J.M. Díaz / (Brazil) L. Campagnolo | 6 | 3 | 6
(Spain) Á. Cepero / (Spain) P. Fernández | 7 | 4 | 4
(Spain) C. Fuster / (Spain) G. Rubio | 6 | 6 | 6
(Argentina) C. Gutiérrez / (Argentina) M. Grabiel | 4 | 3
Q | (Spain) A. Luque / (Spain) J. Sanz | 6 | 6
Bye
3 | (Argentina) Belasteguín / (Argentina) Tapia
4 | (Argentina) Sanyo / (Argentina) Stupaczuk
Bye
(Argentina) A. Allemandi / (Spain) Momo | 5 | 6 | 7
(Spain) J. Mieres / (Spain) M. Piñeiro | 7 | 4 | 5
Q | (Spain) F. Gil Morales / (Spain) S. Alba | 3 | 7 | 4
Q | (Spain) Coello / (Spain) I. Ramírez | 6 | 5 | 6
(Argentina) A. Gutiérrez / (Argentina) J.C. Belluati | 6 | 1 | 4
5 | (Argentina) M. Díaz / (Argentina) Maxi | 3 | 6 | 6
8 | (Argentina) A. Silingo / (Argentina) Di Nenno | 6 | 6
Q | (Argentina) C.G. Gutiérrez / (Portugal) V. Pascoal | 4 | 3
(Spain) J.G. Diestro / (Spain) V. Ruiz | 1 | 1
(Spain) A. Ruiz / (Spain) P. Lijó | 6 | 6
(Spain) A. Blanco / (Spain) J. Martinez | 3 | 3
(Spain) Coki / (Spain) J. Rico | 6 | 6
Bye
2 | (Brazil) P. Lima / (Spain) Paquito

Round of 16
1 | (Spain) Galán / (Spain) Lebrón | 6 | 7
(Argentina) L. Capra / (Argentina) R. Moyano | 3 | 5
(Brazil) L. Bergamini / (Argentina) M. Lamperti | 1 | 6
7 | (Argentina) F. Chingotto / (Argentina) J. Tello | 6 | 7
(Spain) J.M. Díaz / (Brazil) L. Campagnolo | 6 | 7
(Spain) C. Fuster / (Spain) G. Rubio | 3 | 6
Q | (Spain) A. Luque / (Spain) J. Sanz | 6 | 1
3 | (Argentina) Belasteguín / (Argentina) Tapia | 7 | 6
4 | (Argentina) Sanyo / (Argentina) Stupaczuk | 7 | 4 | 6
(Argentina) A. Allemandi / (Spain) Momo | 5 | 6 | 1
Q | (Spain) Coello / (Spain) I. Ramírez | 7 | 2 | 3
5 | (Argentina) M. Díaz / (Argentina) Maxi | 6 | 6 | 6
8 | (Argentina) A. Silingo / (Argentina) Di Nenno | 7 | 6
(Spain) A. Ruiz / (Spain) P. Lijó' | 6 | 3
(Spain) Coki / (Spain) J. Rico | 5 | 1
2 | (Brazil) P. Lima / (Spain) Paquito | 7 | 6

Quarter-Final
1 | (Spain) Galán / (Spain) Lebrón | 6 | 3 | 6
7 | (Argentina) F. Chingotto / (Argentina) J. Tello | 1 | 6 | 3
(Spain) J.M. Díaz / (Brazil) L. Campagnolo | 1 | 1
3 | (Argentina) Belasteguín / (Argentina) Tapia | 6 | 6
4 | (Argentina) Sanyo / (Argentina) Stupaczuk | 6 | 5 | 7
5 | (Argentina) M. Díaz / (Argentina) Maxi | 2 | 7 | 6
8 | (Argentina) A. Silingo / (Argentina) Di Nenno | 6 | 6
2 | (Brazil) P. Lima / (Spain) Paquito | 7 | 7

Semi-Finals
1 | (Spain) Galán / (Spain) Lebrón | 6 | 4 | 2
3 | (Argentina) Belasteguín / (Argentina) Tapia | 2 | 6 | 6
4 | (Argentina) Sanyo / (Argentina) Stupaczuk | 6 | 7
2 | (Brazil) P. Lima / (Spain) Paquito | 3 | 5

Finals
3 | (Argentina) Belasteguín / (Argentina) Tapia | 3 | 5
4 | (Argentina) Sanyo / (Argentina) Stupaczuk | 6 | 7

=== Women's Bracket ===
Round of 32
1 | (Spain) Ariana / (Spain) Salazar
Bye
(Spain) B. Las Heras / (Spain) I. Dominguez | 4 | 6
(Spain) L. Rufo / (Spain) M. Talavan | 6 | 7
(Spain) C. Tur Mari / (Spain) M. Escandell | 6 | 7 | 6
(France) L. Clergue / (France) L. Godallier | 7 | 5 | 7
(Spain) A. Cantin / (Spain) N. Rodríguez | 4 | 2
5 | (Spain) E. Amatriain / (Spain) P. Llaguno | 6 | 6
8 | (Portugal) S. Araújo / (Argentina) V. Riera | 6 | 6
(Spain) E. Carnicero / (Spain) M. Merino | 2 | 2
(Argentina) A. Osoro / (Spain) T. Navarro | 6 | 6 | 2
(Spain) S. Hernández / (Spain) T. Icardo | 2 | 7 | 6
(Spain) L. Alonso / (Brazil) R. Piltcher | 6 | 2 | 3
(Spain) A. Blanco / (Spain) A. Cañellas | 4 | 6 | 6
Bye
4 | (Spain) Majo / (Spain) Mapi
3 | (Spain) Gemma / (Spain) L. Sainz
Bye
(Spain) A.F. de Ossó / (Spain) L. Martínez | 7 | 6
(France) A. Collombon / (Spain) N. Traviesa | 5 | 3
(Spain) A. Galán / (Spain) V. Iglesias | 6 | 6
(Spain) C. Mesa / (Argentina) C. Paz | 3 | 4
(Spain) M. Gabarrus / (Spain) N. Rovira | 3 | 3
7 | (Spain) M. Villalba / (Spain) V. Virseda | 6 | 6
6 | (Portugal) A.C. Nogueira / (Argentina) D. Brea | 6 | 4 | 6
(Spain) B. Caldera / (Spain) C. Goenaga | 3 | 6 | 1
(Spain) C. Navarro / (Spain) S. Ruiz | 6 | 6
(Spain) A. Tapia / (Spain) J. Castelló | 2 | 4
(Spain) A. Martinez / (Argentina) N. Brito | 1 | 1
(Argentina) C. Tenorio / (Argentina) J. Bidahorria | 6 | 6
Bye
2 | (Spain) Bea González / (Spain) M. Ortega

Round of 16
1 | (Spain) Ariana / (Spain) Salazar | 6 | 6
(Spain) L. Rufo / (Spain) M. Talavan | 0 | 1
(France) L. Clergue / (France) L. Godallier | 1 | 0
5 | (Spain) E. Amatriain / (Spain) P. Llaguno | 6 | 6
8 | (Portugal) S. Araújo / (Argentina) V. Riera | 6 | 6
(Spain) S. Hernández / (Spain) T. Icardo | 3 | 3
(Spain) A. Blanco / (Spain) A. Cañellas | 5 | 3
4 | (Spain) Majo / (Spain) Mapi | 7 | 6
3 | (Spain) Gemma / (Spain) L. Sainz | 6 | 6
(Spain) A.F. de Ossó / (Spain) L. Martínez | 0 | 1
(Spain) A. Galán / (Spain) V. Iglesias | 6 | 6
7 | (Spain) M. Villalba / (Spain) V. Virseda | 3 | 4
6 | (Portugal) A.C. Nogueira / (Argentina) D. Brea | 6 | 4 | 6
(Spain) C. Navarro / (Spain) S. Ruiz | 2 | 6 | 3
(Argentina) C. Tenorio / (Argentina) J. Bidahorria | 6 | 2
2 | (Spain) Bea González / (Spain) M. Ortega | 7 | 6

Quarter-Final
1 | (Spain) Ariana / (Spain) Salazar | 6 | 6
5 | (Spain) E. Amatriain / (Spain) P. Llaguno | 0 | 2
8 | (Portugal) S. Araújo / (Argentina) V. Riera | 7 | 5 | 1
4 | (Spain) Majo / (Spain) Mapi | 6 | 7 | 6
3 | (Spain) Gemma / (Spain) L. Sainz | 6 | 6
(Spain) A. Galán / (Spain) V. Iglesias | 3 | 2
6 | (Portugal) A.C. Nogueira / (Argentina) D. Brea | 1 | 5
2 | (Spain) Bea González / (Spain) M. Ortega | 6 | 7

Semi-Finals
1 | (Spain) Ariana / (Spain) Salazar | 6 | 6
4 | (Spain) Majo / (Spain) Mapi | 2 | 3
3 | (Spain) Gemma / (Spain) L. Sainz | 6 | 6
2 | (Spain) Bea González / (Spain) M. Ortega | 3 | 3

Finals
1 | (Spain) Ariana / (Spain) Salazar | 3 | 6 | 6
3 | (Spain) Gemma / (Spain) L. Sainz | 6 | 1 | 2

== Results ==
=== Round of 32 ===
Men's
| Date | Winners | Score | Opponent | Ref. |
|---|---|---|---|---|
| 23/9/2020 | (Argentina) Luciano Capra (Argentina) Ramiro Moyano | 3–6 / 6–3 / 6–4 | (Spain) Nacho Gadea (Argentina) Sebastián Nerone | |
| 23/9/2020 | (Brazil) Lucas Bergamini (Argentina) Miguel Lamperti | 6–2 / 7–6 | (Argentina) Federico Quiles (Spain) Javi Garrido | |
| 23/9/2020 | (Argentina) Federico Chingotto (Argentina) Juan Tello | 6–2 / 6–3 | (Spain) Ernesto Moreno (Spain) José Rico | |
| 23/9/2020 | (Spain) Juan Martín Díaz (Brazil) Lucas Campagnolo | 6–2 / 3–6 / 6–2 | (Spain) Javi Ruiz (Spain) Uri Botello | |
| 23/9/2020 | (Spain) Christian Fuster (Spain) Gonzalo Rubio | 6–7 / 6–4 / 6–4 | (Spain) Álvaro Cepero (Spain) Pincho Fernández | |
| 23/9/2020 | (Spain) Antonio Luque (Spain) Jon Sanz | 6–4 / 6–3 | (Argentina) Cristian Gutiérrez (Argentina) Maxi Grabiel | |
| 23/9/2020 | (Argentina) Adrián Allemandi (Spain) Momo González | 5–7 / 6–4 / 7–5 | (Spain) Juani Mieres (Spain) Martin Sánchez Piñeiro | |
| 23/9/2020 | (Spain) Arturo Coello (Spain) Iván Ramírez | 6–3 / 5–7 / 6–4 | (Spain) Francisco Gil Morales (Spain) Sergio Alba | |
| 23/9/2020 | (Spain) Matías Díaz (Argentina) Maxi Sánchez | 3–6 / 6–1 / 6–4 | (Argentina) Agustin Gutiérrez (Argentina) Juan Cruz Belluati | |
| 23/9/2020 | (Argentina) Agustin Gomez Silingo (Argentina) Martín Di Nenno | 6–4 / 6–3 | (Argentina) Cristian German Gutiérrez (Portugal) Vasco Pascoal | |
| 23/9/2020 | (Spain) Alejandro Ruiz (Spain) Pablo Lijó | 6–1 / 6–1 | (Spain) José García Diestro (Spain) Victor Ruiz | |
| 23/9/2020 | (Spain) Coki Nieto (Spain) Javi Rico | 6–3 / 6–3 | (Spain) Adrián Blanco (Spain) Javier Martinez Vazquez | |

Women's
| Date | Winners | Score | Opponent | Ref. |
|---|---|---|---|---|
| 23/9/2020 | (Spain) Lorena Rufo (Spain) Marta Talavan | 6–4 / 7–6 | (Spain) Barbara Las Heras (Spain) Isabel Dominguez | |
| 23/9/2020 | (France) Laura Clergue (France) Léa Godallier | 7–6 / 5–7 / 7–6 | (Spain) Carla Tur Mari (Spain) Maria del Pilar Escandell | |
| 23/9/2020 | (Spain) Elisabeth Amatriain (Spain) Patricia Llaguno | 6–4 / 6–2 | (Spain) Angela Caro Cantin (Spain) Nuria Rodríguez | |
| 23/9/2020 | (Portugal) Sofia Araújo (Argentina) Virginia Riera | 6–2 / 6–2 | (Spain) Esther Carnicero (Spain) Melania Merino | |
| 23/9/2020 | (Spain) Sandra Hernández (Spain) Tamara Icardo | 2–6 / 7–6 / 6–2 | (Argentina) Aranzazu Osoro (Spain) Teresa Navarro | |
| 23/9/2020 | (Spain) Alicia Blanco Rojo (Spain) Ariadna Cañellas | 4–6 / 6–2 / 6–3 | (Spain) Lorena Alonso (Brazil) Raquel Piltcher | |
| 23/9/2020 | (Spain) Ana Fernández de Ossó (Spain) Lucía Martínez | 7–5 / 6–3 | (France) Alix Collombon (Spain) Nicole Traviesa Mola | |
| 23/9/2020 | (Spain) Alba Galán (Spain) Victoria Iglesias | 6–3 / 6–4 | (Spain) Carla Mesa (Argentina) Celeste Paz | |
| 23/9/2020 | (Spain) Maria Villalba (Spain) Verónica Virseda | 6–3 / 6–3 | (Spain) Maite Gabarrús (Spain) Nuria Rovira | |
| 23/9/2020 | (Portugal) Ana Catarina Nogueira (Argentina) Delfina Brea | 6–3 / 4–6 / 6–1 | (Spain) Beatriz Caldera (Spain) Carmen Goenaga | |
| 23/9/2020 | (Spain) Carolina Navarro (Spain) Sara Ruiz | 6–2 / 6–4 | (Spain) Anna Cortiles Tapia (Spain) Jessica Castelló | |
| 23/9/2020 | (Argentina) Catalina Tenorio (Argentina) Julieta Bidahorria | 6–1 / 6–1 | (Spain) Araceli Martinez (Argentina) Nela Brito | |

=== Round of 16 ===
Men's
| Date | Winners | Score | Opponent | Ref. |
|---|---|---|---|---|
| 24/9/2020 | (Spain) Alejandro Galán (Spain) Juan Lebrón | 6–3 / 7–5 | (Argentina) Luciano Capra (Argentina) Ramiro Moyano | |
| 24/9/2020 | (Argentina) Federico Chingotto (Argentina) Juan Tello | 6–1 / 7–6 | (Brazil) Lucas Bergamini (Argentina) Miguel Lamperti | |
| 24/9/2020 | (Spain) Juan Martín Díaz (Brazil) Lucas Campagnolo | 6–3 / 7–6 | (Spain) Christian Fuster (Spain) Gonzalo Rubio | |
| 24/9/2020 | (Argentina) Agustín Tapia (Argentina) Fernando Belasteguín | 7–6 / 6–1 | (Spain) Antonio Luque (Spain) Jon Sanz | |
| 24/9/2020 | (Argentina) Franco Stupaczuk (Argentina) Sanyo Gutiérrez | 7–5 / 4–6 / 6–1 | (Argentina) Adrián Allemandi (Spain) Momo González | |
| 24/9/2020 | (Spain) Matías Díaz (Argentina) Maxi Sánchez | 6–7 / 6–2 / 6–3 | (Spain) Arturo Coello (Spain) Iván Ramírez | |
| 24/9/2020 | (Argentina) Agustin Gomez Silingo (Argentina) Martín Di Nenno | 7–6 / 6–3 | (Spain) Alejandro Ruiz (Spain) Pablo Lijó | |
| 24/9/2020 | (Brazil) Pablo Lima (Spain) Paquito Navarro | 7–5 / 6–1 | (Spain) Coki Nieto (Spain) Javi Rico | |

Women's
| Date | Winners | Score | Opponent | Ref. |
|---|---|---|---|---|
| 24/9/2020 | (Spain) Alejandra Salazar (Spain) Ariana Sánchez | 6–0 / 6–1 | (Spain) Lorena Rufo (Spain) Marta Talavan | |
| 24/9/2020 | (Spain) Elisabeth Amatriain (Spain) Patricia Llaguno | 6–1 / 6–0 | (France) Laura Clergue (France) Léa Godallier | |
| 24/9/2020 | (Portugal) Sofia Araújo (Argentina) Virginia Riera | 6–3 / 6–3 | (Spain) Sandra Hernández (Spain) Tamara Icardo | |
| 24/9/2020 | (Spain) Majo Sánchez (Spain) Mapi Sánchez | 7–5 / 6–3 | (Spain) Alicia Blanco Rojo (Spain) Ariadna Cañellas | |
| 24/9/2020 | (Spain) Gemma Triay (Spain) Lucia Sainz | 6–0 / 6–1 | (Spain) Ana Fernández de Ossó (Spain) Lucía Martínez | |
| 24/9/2020 | (Spain) Alba Galán (Spain) Victoria Iglesias | 6–3 / 6–4 | (Spain) Maria Villalba (Spain) Verónica Virseda | |
| 24/9/2020 | (Portugal) Ana Catarina Nogueira (Argentina) Delfina Brea | 6–2 / 4–6 / 6–3 | (Spain) Carolina Navarro (Spain) Sara Ruiz | |
| 24/9/2020 | (Spain) Bea González (Spain) Marta Ortega | 7–6 / 6–2 | (Argentina) Catalina Tenorio (Argentina) Julieta Bidahorria | |

=== Quarter-Finals ===
Men's
| Date | Winners | Score | Opponent | Ref. |
|---|---|---|---|---|
| 25/9/2020 | (Spain) Alejandro Galán (Spain) Juan Lebrón | 6–1 / 3–6 / 6–3 | (Argentina) Federico Chingotto (Argentina) Juan Tello | |
| 25/9/2020 | (Argentina) Agustín Tapia (Argentina) Fernando Belasteguín | 6–1 / 6–1 | (Spain) Juan Martín Díaz (Brazil) Lucas Campagnolo | |
| 25/9/2020 | (Argentina) Franco Stupaczuk (Argentina) Sanyo Gutiérrez | 6–2 / 5–7 / 7–6 | (Spain) Matías Díaz (Argentina) Maxi Sánchez | |
| 25/9/2020 | (Brazil) Pablo Lima (Spain) Paquito Navarro | 7–6 / 7–6 | (Argentina) Agustin Gomez Silingo (Argentina) Martín Di Nenno | |

Women's
| Date | Winners | Score | Opponent | Ref. |
|---|---|---|---|---|
| 25/9/2020 | (Spain) Alejandra Salazar (Spain) Ariana Sánchez | 6–0 / 6–2 | (Spain) Elisabeth Amatriain (Spain) Patricia Llaguno | |
| 25/9/2020 | (Spain) Majo Sánchez (Spain) Mapi Sánchez | 6–7 / 7–5 / 6–1 | (Portugal) Sofia Araújo (Argentina) Virginia Riera | |
| 25/9/2020 | (Spain) Gemma Triay (Spain) Lucia Sainz | 6–3 / 6–2 | (Spain) Alba Galán (Spain) Victoria Iglesias | |
| 25/9/2020 | (Spain) Bea González (Spain) Marta Ortega | 6–1 / 7–5 | (Portugal) Ana Catarina Nogueira (Argentina) Delfina Brea | |

=== Semi-Finals ===
Men's
| Date | Winners | Score | Opponent | Ref. |
|---|---|---|---|---|
| 26/9/2020 | (Argentina) Agustín Tapia (Argentina) Fernando Belasteguín | 2–6 / 6–4 / 6–2 | (Spain) Alejandro Galán (Spain) Juan Lebrón | |
| 26/9/2020 | (Argentina) Franco Stupaczuk (Argentina) Sanyo Gutiérrez | 6–3 / 7–5 | (Brazil) Pablo Lima (Spain) Paquito Navarro | |

Women's
| Date | Winners | Score | Opponent | Ref. |
|---|---|---|---|---|
| 26/9/2020 | (Spain) Alejandra Salazar (Spain) Ariana Sánchez | 6–2 / 6–3 | (Spain) Majo Sánchez (Spain) Mapi Sánchez | |
| 26/9/2020 | (Spain) Gemma Triay (Spain) Lucia Sainz | 6–3 / 6–3 | (Spain) Bea González (Spain) Marta Ortega | |

=== Finals ===
Men's
| Date | Winners | Score | Opponent | Ref. |
|---|---|---|---|---|
| 27/9/2020 | (Argentina) Franco Stupaczuk (Argentina) Sanyo Gutiérrez | 6–3 / 7–5 | (Argentina) Agustín Tapia (Argentina) Fernando Belasteguín | |

Women's
| Date | Winners | Score | Opponent | Ref. |
|---|---|---|---|---|
| 27/9/2020 | (Spain) Alejandra Salazar (Spain) Ariana Sánchez | 3–6 / 6–1 / 6–2 | (Spain) Gemma Triay (Spain) Lucia Sainz | |
