= 2020 World Padel Tour =

Eight edition of the World Padel Tour

Details
- Duration: 2 March – 13 December
- Edition: 8th
- Tournaments: 11
- Categories: Open (8); Master (2); Masters Finals (1)

Achievements (singles)
- Most titles: Male (Spain) Alejandro Galán (Spain) Juan Lebrón (6); Female (Spain) Gemma Triay (Spain) Lucía Sainz (5)
- Most finals: Male (Spain) Alejandro Galán (Spain) Juan Lebrón (8); Female (Spain) Gemma Triay (Spain) Lucía Sainz (7)

The 2020 World Padel Tour was the eighth edition of the World Padel Tour, the most prestigious professional padel circuit in the world.

In the men's division, Alejandro Galán and Juan Lebrón would not have a pair capable of challenging them for the circuit leadership, dominating the circuit and being crowned world number ones together for the first time, allowing Lebrón to retain the position obtained the previous year.

In the women's division, Alejandra Salazar and Ariana Sánchez led the race for the top ranking for most of the season, but their inconsistent results, coupled with a devastating second half of the season where their rivals won five of the six tournaments played, allowed Gemma Triay and Lucia Sainz, in their last year as a pair, to overtake their rivals and be crowned number one at the end of the year for the first time.

== Schedule ==
In 2020, 22 World Padel Tour events were planned, with the "Master" tournaments awarding the most points, followed by the "Open" and "Challenger" tournaments. The latter, geared towards lower-ranked players, awarded the fewest points. Among the events on the calendar were the Lugo WOpen, a women-only tournament, and the men-only international tournaments in Buenos Aires, Brussels, Mexico, and Brazil. The remaining international tournaments in Båstad, Cascais, and Rome were to feature both men and women.

Two additional exhibitions were included, one in Yucatán, which was ultimately postponed due to the COVID-19 pandemic, and another in Stockholm. The Yucatán exhibition was scheduled for March 13–15, 2020, and the Stockholm exhibition for April 15–18.

On March 10 2020, the cancellation of the second tournament of the season, the Vigo Open, was confirmed due to the coronavirus pandemic. Two days later, on March 12, the World Padel Tour announced changes to the 2020 calendar, rescheduling the Córdoba Open and the Brasil Open due to the Padel World Championship being moved from October to November. Two Challenger tournaments were also added to the calendar, in the cities of Albacete and Santander. Due to the state of emergency declared by the Spanish government, caused by the coronavirus pandemic, the tournaments following the Vigo Open, in the months of April, May and June, also had to be postponed or cancelled.

The 2020 Padel World Championships organized by the International Padel Federation (FIP), we're also scheduled to take place in Qatar during November, but would be postponed to the following year.

== Season Summary ==
=== Partner and ranking changes ===
On the men's side, only one of the pairs that finished on the top 4 in the previous season would start the new season together. The main change would be the separation of the world's number 1 pair, Juan Lebrón and Paquito Navarro, who despite becoming the first Spanish pair to reach the pinnacle of professional padel, would choose to end their partnership. Paquito Navarro would choose Pablo Lima as his new partner, while Juan Lebrón would team up with Alejandro Galán, with whom he had already won the Pairs World Cup in 2018, thus also ending the third-ranked pair. Another pair that would also separate was the second ranked pair, Maxi Sánchez and Sanyo Gutiérrez. Their new partners would be the members of the 5th ranked pair, who would also split up, Franco Stupaczuk and Matías Díaz, with Stupaczuk joining Sanyo and Matías joining Maxi, and starting as the 3rd and 4th ranked pairs respectively. With these changes, Agustín Tapia and Fernando Belasteguín would drop from the 4th to the 5th ranked pair.

In the women's category, only one of the top 4 pairs would start the new season together. The main pair to separate would be Marta Ortega and Marta Marrero, the number one ranked pair. Marrero would team up with one of Spain's rising young talents, Paula Josemaría, while Ortega would choose the young prodigy Bea González, just 19 years old, as her new partner. With Bea and Paula forming new pairs, their former partners would join forces, with Ana Catarina Nogueira and Delfina Brea completing the top 4.

=== First part of the season ===
==== First tournament and interruption due to COVID ====
In the first tournament of the season, the Marbella Master, the top two men's and women's pairs teams both reached the final. On the men's side, Pablo Lima and Paquito Navarro defeated their former partners, Alejandro Galán and Juan Lebrón, to become the inaugural men's champions of the season, with Paquito taking the sole lead in the rankings. On the women's side, Marta Marrero and Paula Josemaria defeated Alejandra Salazar and Ariana Sánchez, becoming the first women's pair to win a title this season, with Marrero taking the sole lead in the rankings.

However, this would be the last tournament in the first half of 2020, with the following six tournaments being cancelled due to the COVID-19 pandemic and the ranking being frozen until 2021, with the new Race Ranking now serving as the main points system.

=== Return to competition ===
The return from the break would be different in the men's and women's divisions. On the women's side, the following four tournaments would have four different finals. In the first tournament back, Ariana and Salazar defeated Gemma Triay and Lucia Sainz to win their first title of the year; in the second tournament, Bea González and Marta Ortega won their first title of the year, with Bea becoming (at the time) the youngest ever to win a title on the main circuit; in the third event, Bea and Marta were defeated by the twins Majo and Mapi Sánchez, who also won their first title of the season; while in the fifth tournament of the season in Valencia, Ariana and Salazar won their second title of the year by defeating Marrero and Josemaria, in a rematch of the first tournament of the year.

On the men's side, Galán and Lebrón dominated, reaching and winning all four finals. The first title of the season came at the Estrella Damm Open, where they avenged their defeat in the previous tournament by beating Lima and Paquito. Two weeks later, they won their second title by defeating Agustín Tapia and Fernando Belasteguín in the final. They would go on to win two more titles by defeating Federico Chingotto and Juan Tello in the finals in Madrid and Valencia.

=== Second part of the season ===
==== September–October ====
The second half of the season would begin differently from where the first ended. On the men's side, for the first time in the season, Galán and Lebrón would not reach the final, with Belasteguín and Tapia winning the Sardegna Open, and Franco Stupaczuk and Sanyo Gutiérrez defeating Belasteguín and Tapia to win their first and only tournament of the season, the Menorca Open. On the women's side, Gemma and Lucia defeated Josemaria and Marrero to lift their first title of the season in Sardignia, while Ariana and Salazar won their third by defeating Gemma and Lucia in Menorca.

The biggest impact on the race for the world number 1 spot would come in the second and final Master of the season, the Barcelona Master, where Galán and Lebrón consolidated their dominance on the circuit by defeating Sanyo and Stupaczuk to win their fifth title out of eight possible, while Gemma Triay and Lucia Sainz defeated the twins Majo and Mapi Sánchez to take the lead in the Race to finish the year as world number 1.

=== November–December ===
In the two tournaments held during November, Gemma and Lucia continued their march towards the world number 1 ranking by defeating the newly formed 3rd and 5th ranked pairs, who had been reformed with partner swaps. In Alicante, they defeated the 'Martas', Marta Marrero and Marta Ortega, and in Las Rozas they defeated Bea González and Paula Josemaria to win their third and fourth titles of the year, and move closer to finishing the year as leaders of the ranking. On the men's side, Alejandro Galán and Juan Lebrón defeated Sanyo and Stupaczuk again to win their sixth title of 2020, while after being defeated by Federico Chingotto and Juan Tello in the semifinals of the following tournament, they automatically crowned Chingotto and Tello as champions since Pablo Lima and Paquito Navarro could not play the final due to Lima's injury.

The season-ending tournament, the Master Final, would be won by two pairs who would not continue together for the following season. On the men's side, Agustín Tapia and Fernando Belasteguín would defeat the already crowned world number 1s of 2020, Galán and Lebrón, to become the youngest and oldest 'Maestro' of all time, respectively. On the women's side, Gemma and Lucia, by defeating Ariana Sánchez and Alejandra Salazar, would say goodbye as a pair with their fifth title of the season and as the year-end world number ones.

== Tournaments and results ==
Open Master Challenger Master Final

| Tournament | Date | Men's | | | Women's | | |
| Tournament | Date | Winners | Score | Runners-up | Winners | Score | Runners-up |
|---|---|---|---|---|---|---|---|
| (Spain) Marbella Master | 2 – 8 March | (Brazil) Pablo Lima (Spain) Paquito Navarro | 7–6 / 2–6 / 6–3 | (Spain) Alejandro Galán (Spain) Juan Lebrón | (Spain) Marta Marrero (Spain) Paula Josemaría | 7–6 / 3–6 / 6–2 | (Spain) Alejandra Salazar (Spain) Ariana Sánchez |
| (Mexico) Yucatán Exhibition | 13 – 15 March | Canceled | | | Canceled | | |
| (Spain) Vigo Open | 23 – 29 March | Canceled | | | Canceled | | |
| (Sweden) Stockholm Exhibition | 15 – 18 April | Canceled | | | Canceled | | |
| (Spain) Oviedo Open | 11 – 17 May | Canceled | | | Canceled | | |
| (Argentina) Buenos Aires Master | 2 – 7 June | Canceled | | | Canceled | | |
| (Spain) Lleida Open | 8 – 14 June | Canceled | | | Canceled | | |
| (Spain) Valladolid Master | 22 – 28 June | Canceled | | | Canceled | | |
| (Spain) Estrella Damm Open | 28 June – 5 July | (Spain) Alejandro Galán (Spain) Juan Lebrón | 7–5 / 6–3 | (Brazil) Pablo Lima (Spain) Paquito Navarro | (Spain) Alejandra Salazar (Spain) Ariana Sánchez | 6–2 / 6–3 | (Spain) Gemma Triay (Spain) Lucía Sainz |
| (Spain) Vuelve a Madrid Open | 12 – 19 July | (Spain) Alejandro Galán (Spain) Juan Lebrón | 4–6 / 6–1 / 6–4 | (Argentina) Agustín Tapia (Argentina) Fernando Belasteguín | (Spain) Bea González (Spain) Marta Ortega | 5–7 / 6–1 / 6–1 | (Spain) Elisabeth Amatriaín (Spain) Patricia Llaguno |
| (Spain) Adeslas Open | 2 – 9 August | (Spain) Alejandro Galán (Spain) Juan Lebrón | 6–7 / 6–1 / 6–4 | (Argentina) Federico Chingotto (Argentina) Juan Tello | (Spain) Mapi Sánchez (Spain) Majo Sánchez | 4–6 / 6–4 / 6–4 | (Spain) Bea González (Spain) Marta Ortega |
| (Spain) Málaga Open | 3 – 5 August | Canceled | | | Canceled | | |
| (Spain) Valencia Open | 30 August – 6 September | (Spain) Alejandro Galán (Spain) Juan Lebrón | 6–3 / 7–6 | (Argentina) Federico Chingotto (Argentina) Juan Tello | (Spain) Alejandra Salazar (Spain) Ariana Sánchez | 7–5 / 7–6 | (Spain) Marta Marrero (Spain) Paula Josemaría |
| Italy Open | 31 August – 6 September | Canceled | | | Canceled | | |
| (Italy) Sardegna Open | 6 – 13 September | (Argentina) Agustín Tapia (Argentina) Fernando Belasteguín | 6–1 / 6–4 | (Spain) Javier Ruiz (Spain) Uri Botello | (Spain) Gemma Triay (Spain) Lucía Sainz | 6–0 / 6–7 / 7–6 | (Spain) Marta Marrero (Spain) Paula Josemaría |
| Portugal Master | 14 – 20 September | Canceled | | | Canceled | | |
| (Spain) Menorca Open | 20 – 27 September | (Argentina) Franco Stupaczuk (Argentina) Sanyo Gutiérrez | 6–3 / 7–5 | (Argentina) Agustín Tapia (Argentina) Fernando Belasteguín | (Spain) Alejandra Salazar (Spain) Ariana Sánchez | 3–6 / 6–1 / 6–2 | (Spain) Gemma Triay (Spain) Lucía Sainz |
| (Belgium) Brussels Open | 28 September – 4 October | Canceled | | | Canceled | | |
| (Spain) Barcelona Master | 10 – 18 October | (Spain) Alejandro Galán (Spain) Juan Lebrón | 6–4 / 6–1 | (Argentina) Franco Stupaczuk (Argentina) Sanyo Gutiérrez | (Spain) Gemma Triay (Spain) Lucía Sainz | 6–2 / 6–3 | (Spain) Mapi Sánchez (Spain) Majo Sánchez |
| (Spain) Córdoba Open | 26 October – 1 November | Canceled | | | Canceled | | |
| Sweden Open | 2 – 8 November | Canceled | | | Canceled | | |
| (Spain) Alicante Open | 4 – 8 November | (Spain) Alejandro Galán (Spain) Juan Lebrón | 4–6 / 6–3 / 6–4 | (Argentina) Franco Stupaczuk (Argentina) Sanyo Gutiérrez | (Spain) Gemma Triay (Spain) Lucía Sainz | 2–6 / 7–6 / 6–3 | (Spain) Marta Marrero (Spain) Marta Ortega |
| (Spain) Lugo WOpen | 8 – 15 November | Canceled | | | Canceled | | |
| Brazil Open | 17-22 November | Canceled | | | Canceled | | |
| (Spain) Las Rozas Open | 18 – 22 November | (Argentina) Federico Chingotto (Argentina) Juan Tello | W.O. | (Brazil) Pablo Lima (Spain) Paquito Navarro | (Spain) Gemma Triay (Spain) Lucía Sainz | 6–0 / 7–6 | (Spain) Bea González (Spain) Paula Josemaría |
| Mexico Open | 24 – 29 November | Canceled | | | Canceled | | |
| (Spain) Master Final | 10 – 13 December | (Argentina) Agustín Tapia (Argentina) Fernando Belasteguín | 6–3 / 7–6 | (Spain) Alejandro Galán (Spain) Juan Lebrón | (Spain) Gemma Triay (Spain) Lucía Sainz | 6–4 / 6–3 | (Spain) Alejandra Salazar (Spain) Ariana Sánchez |

== End of season ranking ==
=== Men's Ranking ===
| 2020 Men's Ranking | | | Tournament Statistics | | | | Tournaments Won | | | |
| N.º | Name | Points | Matches | Wins | Losses | Win % | Open | Master | Master Final | Total |
|---|---|---|---|---|---|---|---|---|---|---|
| 1 | (Spain) Alejandro Galán | 8.860 | 42 | 37 | 5 | 88.1 | 5 | 1 | 0 | 6 |
| 1 | (Spain) Juan Lebrón | 8.860 | 42 | 37 | 5 | 88.1 | 5 | 1 | 0 | 6 |
| 3 | (Argentina) Agustín Tapia | 5.185 | 34 | 26 | 8 | 76.47 | 1 | 0 | 1 | 2 |
| 3 | (Argentina) Fernando Belasteguín | 5.185 | 34 | 26 | 8 | 76.47 | 1 | 0 | 1 | 2 |
| 5 | (Spain) Paquito Navarro | 5.005 | 31 | 22 | 9 | 70.97 | 0 | 1 | 0 | 1 |
| 6 | (Argentina) Franco Stupaczuk | 4.960 | 32 | 22 | 10 | 68.75 | 1 | 0 | 0 | 1 |
| 6 | (Argentina) Sanyo Gutiérrez | 4.960 | 32 | 22 | 10 | 68.75 | 1 | 0 | 0 | 1 |
| 8 | (Brazil) Pablo Lima | 4.770 | 30 | 22 | 8 | 73.33 | 0 | 1 | 0 | 1 |
| 9 | (Argentina) Federico Chingotto | 4.005 | 33 | 24 | 9 | 72.73 | 1 | 0 | 0 | 1 |
| 9 | (Argentina) Juan Tello | 4.005 | 33 | 24 | 9 | 72.73 | 1 | 0 | 0 | 1 |
| 11 | (Argentina) Maxi Sánchez | 2.700 | 27 | 16 | 11 | 59.26 | 0 | 0 | 0 | 0 |
| 12 | (Argentina) Martín Di Nenno | 2.260 | 27 | 16 | 11 | 59.26 | 0 | 0 | 0 | 0 |
| 13 | (Spain) Matías Díaz | 2.235 | 24 | 14 | 10 | 58.33 | 0 | 0 | 0 | 0 |
| 14 | (Spain) Javier Ruiz | 2.065 | 25 | 14 | 11 | 56 | 0 | 0 | 0 | 0 |
| 14 | (Spain) Uri Botello | 2.065 | 25 | 14 | 11 | 56 | 0 | 0 | 0 | 0 |
| 16 | (Argentina) Agustín Gómez Silingo | 1.885 | 25 | 14 | 11 | 56 | 0 | 0 | 0 | 0 |

=== Women's Ranking ===
| 2020 Women's Ranking | | | Tournament Statistics | | | | Tournaments Won | | | |
| N.º | Name | Points | Matches | Wins | Losses | Win % | Open | Master | Master Final | Total |
|---|---|---|---|---|---|---|---|---|---|---|
| 1 | (Spain) Gemma Triay | 8.375 | 41 | 35 | 6 | 85.37 | 3 | 1 | 1 | 5 |
| 1 | (Spain) Lucía Sainz | 8.375 | 41 | 35 | 6 | 85.37 | 3 | 1 | 1 | 5 |
| 3 | (Spain) Alejandra Salazar | 6.310 | 36 | 28 | 8 | 77.78 | 3 | 0 | 0 | 3 |
| 3 | (Spain) Ariana Sánchez | 6.310 | 36 | 28 | 8 | 77.78 | 3 | 0 | 0 | 3 |
| 5 | (Spain) Marta Marrero | 5.050 | 33 | 24 | 9 | 72.73 | 0 | 1 | 0 | 1 |
| 6 | (Spain) Paula Josemaría | 4.855 | 33 | 24 | 9 | 72.73 | 0 | 1 | 0 | 1 |
| 7 | (Spain) Bea González | 4.525 | 35 | 25 | 10 | 71.43 | 1 | 0 | 0 | 1 |
| 7 | (Spain) Marta Ortega | 4.525 | 35 | 25 | 10 | 71.43 | 1 | 0 | 0 | 1 |
| 9 | (Spain) Mapi Sánchez | 4.390 | 34 | 24 | 10 | 70.59 | 1 | 0 | 0 | 1 |
| 9 | (Spain) Majo Sánchez | 4.390 | 34 | 24 | 10 | 70.59 | 1 | 0 | 0 | 1 |
| 11 | (Spain) Elisabeth Amatriaín | 3.130 | 35 | 24 | 11 | 68.57 | 0 | 0 | 0 | 0 |
| 11 | (Spain) Patricia Llaguno | 3.130 | 35 | 24 | 11 | 68.57 | 0 | 0 | 0 | 0 |
| 13 | (Spain) Carolina Navarro | 1.995 | 26 | 15 | 11 | 57.69 | 0 | 0 | 0 | 0 |
| 14 | (Argentina) Aranzazu Osoro | 1.943 | 23 | 12 | 11 | 52.17 | 0 | 0 | 0 | 0 |
| 15 | (Portugal) Sofia Araújo | 1.550 | 22 | 11 | 11 | 50 | 0 | 0 | 0 | 0 |
| 15 | (Argentina) Virginia Riera | 1.550 | 22 | 11 | 11 | 50 | 0 | 0 | 0 | 0 |
