= 2020 WPT Sardegna Open =

World Padel Tour tournament held in Sardinia, Italy

- Date: 6 – 13 September
- Edition: 1st
- Category: Open
- Location: Sardinia, Italy
- Venue: Tennis Club Cagliar

Champions
- Men's doubles: (Argentina) Agustín Tapia (Argentina) Fernando Belasteguín
- Women's doubles: (Spain) Gemma Triay (Spain) Lucía Sainz

Chronology

The 2020 Sardegna Open (officially 2020 World Padel Tour Sardegna Open) was the sixth tournament of the eight season organized by World Padel Tour, the most prestigious padel circuit at the time, and the first tournament organized by the main padel circuit in Italy.

In the women's category, the second and fifth ranked pairs reached the final. The first finalists were the number five ranked pair, Gemma Triay and Lucia Sainz, who after defeating the world number ones, Alejandra Salazar and Ariana Sánchez, in the quarterfinals, defeated the third ranked pair, Bea González and Marta Ortega, in the semifinals to reach their second final of the year. Their opponents were the number two ranked pair, Marta Marrero and Paula Josemaria, who reached their second consecutive final after defeating the number four ranked pair, Majo and Mapi Sánchez. In the final, Gemma and Lucia defeated Josemaria and Marrero in two sets to win their first title of the season and become the first women's pair to win a title in Italy.

In the men's category, an unprecedented final would take place, with the number three and number six ranked pairs by the FIP reaching the final. The first finalists were Javi Ruiz and Uri Botello, who eliminated the world number ones, Alejandro Galán and Juan Lebrón, in the semifinals to reach the third final of their careers, also marking the first time this season that Galán and Lebrón did not reach the championship match. Their opponents were the number three ranked pair, Agustín Tapia and Fernando Belasteguín, who defeated Agustin Gomez Silingo and Martín Di Nenno in the semifinals. In the final, Belasteguín and Tapia defeated Botello and Ruiz in two sets, winning their first title of the season and becoming the inaugural men's champions on Italian soil.

The world number two pair, Pablo Lima and Paquito Navarro, would not compete in the tournament due to Lima's medical leave after contracting Covid-19, which had forced him to withdraw from the quarterfinals of the previous tournament.

== Head-to-head record between teams ranked in the top 4 during the season ==
=== Men's ===
Record	Galán–Lebrón	Lima–Paquito	Belasteguín–Tapia	Sanyo–Stupaczuk	Former Pairs	Díaz–Maxi
Galán–Lebrón	—	1–1	1–0	4–0		1–0
Lima–Paquito	1–1	—	0–1	—		1–0
Belasteguín–Tapia	0–1	1–0	—	0–2		0–1
Sanyo–Stupaczuk	0–4	—	2–0	—		—
Former Pairs
Díaz–Maxi	0–1	0–1	1–0	—		—

=== Women's ===
Record	Ariana–Salazar	Josemaria–Marrero	Bea–Ortega	Majo–Mapi	Former Pairs	Gemma–Lucia	Delfina–Nogueira
Ariana–Salazar	—	1–1	1–1	1–0		1–1	1–0
Josemaria–Marrero	1–1	—	1–0	2–1		2–2	—
Bea–Ortega	1–1	0–1	—	2–1		0–1	—
Majo–Mapi	0–1	1–2	1–2	—		1–0	1–0
Former Pairs
Gemma–Lucia	1–1	2–2	1–0	0–1		—	1–0
Delfina–Nogueira	0–1	—	—	0–1		0–1	—

== Draws ==
=== Men's Bracket ===
Round of 32
1	(Spain) Galán / (Spain) Lebrón
Bye
Q	(Spain) J. Moya / (Spain) J. Barahona	4	6
(Spain) A. Blanco / (Spain) J. Martinez	6	7
(Spain) C. Fuster / (Spain) G. Rubio	6	3	4
(Spain) J.G. Diestro / (Spain) V. Ruiz	2	6	6
(Spain) Coki / (Spain) J. Rico	6	3	6
7	(Spain) J.M. Díaz / (Spain) P. Fernández	3	6	7
5	(Spain) J. Ruiz / (Spain) U. Botello	7	6
(Spain) Á. Cepero / (Spain) P. Lijó	6	4
LL	(Chile) J. Valdes / (Argentina) J. Restivo	6	6
WC	(Argentina) G. Tamame / (Italy) S. Cremona	2	4
Q	(Spain) J. Campos / (Spain) T. Zapata	6	4	6
(Argentina) A. Britos / (Italy) M. Bruno	1	6	1
Bye
4	(Argentina) M. Díaz / (Argentina) Maxi
3	(Argentina) Sanyo / (Argentina) Stupaczuk
Bye
(Argentina) A. Allemandi / (Spain) Momo	6	6
Q	(Spain) A. Luque / (Spain) J. Sanz	4	4
LL	(Spain) A. Sans / (Spain) I. Zaratiegui	1	2
LL	(Spain) Coello / (Spain) I. Ramírez	6	6
(Argentina) L. Capra / (Argentina) R. Moyano	1	1
8	(Argentina) A. Silingo / (Argentina) Di Nenno	6	6
6	(Argentina) F. Chingotto / (Argentina) J. Tello	6	3	6
Q	(Spain) F. Gil Morales / (Spain) S. Alba	1	6	3
(Brazil) L. Bergamini / (Argentina) M. Lamperti	7	6
(Argentina) A. Gutiérrez / (Argentina) J.C. Belluati	5	0
(Spain) E. Moreno / (Spain) J. Rico	6	6
(Argentina) C. Gutiérrez / (Argentina) M. Grabiel	4	1
Bye
2	(Argentina) Belasteguín / (Argentina) Tapia

Round of 16
1	(Spain) Galán / (Spain) Lebrón	6	6
(Spain) A. Blanco / (Spain) J. Martinez	0	3
(Spain) J.G. Diestro / (Spain) V. Ruiz	2	6
7	(Spain) J.M. Díaz / (Spain) P. Fernández	6	7
5	(Spain) J. Ruiz / (Spain) U. Botello	7	6
LL	(Chile) J. Valdes / (Argentina) J. Restivo	5	3
Q	(Spain) J. Campos / (Spain) T. Zapata	4	3
4	(Argentina) M. Díaz / (Argentina) Maxi	6	6
3	(Argentina) Sanyo / (Argentina) Stupaczuk	6	6
(Argentina) A. Allemandi / (Spain) Momo	1	2
LL	(Spain) Coello / (Spain) I. Ramírez	6	4
8	(Argentina) A. Silingo / (Argentina) Di Nenno	7	6
6	(Argentina) F. Chingotto / (Argentina) J. Tello	6	7
(Brazil) L. Bergamini / (Argentina) M. Lamperti	2	6
(Spain) E. Moreno / (Spain) J. Rico	7	4	6
2	(Argentina) Belasteguín / (Argentina) Tapia	6	6	7

Quarter-Final
1	(Spain) Galán / (Spain) Lebrón	6	6
7	(Spain) J.M. Díaz / (Spain) P. Fernández	3	2
5	(Spain) J. Ruiz / (Spain) U. Botello	6	7
4	(Argentina) M. Díaz / (Argentina) Maxi	1	6
3	(Argentina) Sanyo / (Argentina) Stupaczuk	2	6	6
8	(Argentina) A. Silingo / (Argentina) Di Nenno	6	2	7
6	(Argentina) F. Chingotto / (Argentina) J. Tello	5
2	(Argentina) Belasteguín / (Argentina) Tapia	7	*

Semi-Finals
1	(Spain) Galán / (Spain) Lebrón	4	3
5	(Spain) J. Ruiz / (Spain) U. Botello	6	6
8	(Argentina) A. Silingo / (Argentina) Di Nenno	0	2
2	(Argentina) Belasteguín / (Argentina) Tapia	6	6

Finals
5	(Spain) J. Ruiz / (Spain) U. Botello	1	4
2	(Argentina) Belasteguín / (Argentina) Tapia	6	6

=== Women's Bracket ===
Round of 32
1	(Spain) Ariana / (Spain) Salazar
Bye
(Spain) B. Las Heras / (Spain) I. Dominguez	4	0
(Spain) A.F. de Ossó / (Spain) L. Martínez	6	6
(Argentina) C. Tenorio / (Argentina) J. Bidahorria	6	6
(Spain) A. Blanco / (Spain) A. Cañellas	2	3
(Spain) B. Caldera / (Spain) C. Goenaga	1	2
5	(Spain) Gemma / (Spain) L. Sainz	6	6
6	(Spain) E. Amatriain / (Spain) P. Llaguno	4	6	6
(France) L. Clergue / (France) L. Godallier	6	1	1
WC	(Italy) E. Stellato / (Italy) E. Zanchetta	4	1
(Portugal) S. Araújo / (Argentina) V. Riera	6	6
(Spain) A. Martinez / (Argentina) N. Brito	6	6
(Argentina) C. Paz / (Spain) M. Lobo	2	4
Bye
3	(Spain) Bea González / (Spain) M. Ortega
4	(Spain) Majo / (Spain) Mapi
Bye
(Argentina) M. Goyeneche / (Spain) P. Martinez	6	1
(France) A. Collombon / (Spain) N. Traviesa	7	6
(Spain) L. Alonso / (Brazil) R. Piltcher	4	7	7
(Uruguay) A. De los Santos / (Spain) J. Bautista	6	5	5
(Argentina) A. Osoro / (Spain) T. Navarro	4	3
7	(Portugal) A.C. Nogueira / (Argentina) D. Brea	6	6
8	(Spain) C. Navarro / (Argentina) C. Reiter	6	6
(Spain) M. Quevedo / (Spain) M. Perez	1	2
(Spain) E. Carnicero / (Spain) M. Merino	7	6
(Italy) C. Orsi / (Italy) V. Tommasi	6	1
(Spain) A. Tapia / (Spain) J. Castelló	4	6	7
(Spain) A. Cantin / (Spain) N. Rodríguez	6	2	6
Bye
2	(Spain) M. Marrero / (Spain) P. Josemaría

Round of 16
1	(Spain) Ariana / (Spain) Salazar	6	6
(Spain) A.F. de Ossó / (Spain) L. Martínez	3	0
(Argentina) C. Tenorio / (Argentina) J. Bidahorria	3	2
5	(Spain) Gemma / (Spain) L. Sainz	6	6
6	(Spain) E. Amatriain / (Spain) P. Llaguno	7	4	6
(Portugal) S. Araújo / (Argentina) V. Riera	5	6	7
(Spain) A. Martinez / (Argentina) N. Brito	6	1
3	(Spain) Bea González / (Spain) M. Ortega	7	6
4	(Spain) Majo / (Spain) Mapi	7	6
(France) A. Collombon / (Spain) N. Traviesa	5	1
(Spain) L. Alonso / (Brazil) R. Piltcher	1	4
7	(Portugal) A.C. Nogueira / (Argentina) D. Brea	6	6
8	(Spain) C. Navarro / (Argentina) C. Reiter	7	4	6
(Spain) E. Carnicero / (Spain) M. Merino	5	6	4
(Spain) A. Tapia / (Spain) J. Castelló	1	3
2	(Spain) M. Marrero / (Spain) P. Josemaría	6	6

Quarter-Final
1	(Spain) Ariana / (Spain) Salazar	3	6	5
5	(Spain) Gemma / (Spain) L. Sainz	6	3	7
(Portugal) S. Araújo / (Argentina) V. Riera	7	3	3
3	(Spain) Bea González / (Spain) M. Ortega	5	6	6
4	(Spain) Majo / (Spain) Mapi	6	6
7	(Portugal) A.C. Nogueira / (Argentina) D. Brea	1	4
8	(Spain) C. Navarro / (Argentina) C. Reiter
2	(Spain) M. Marrero / (Spain) P. Josemaría	*

Semi-Finals
5	(Spain) Gemma / (Spain) L. Sainz	6	6
3	(Spain) Bea González / (Spain) M. Ortega	3	3
4	(Spain) Majo / (Spain) Mapi	1	7	3
2	(Spain) M. Marrero / (Spain) P. Josemaría	6	6	6

Finals
5	(Spain) Gemma / (Spain) L. Sainz	6	7
2	(Spain) M. Marrero / (Spain) P. Josemaría	0	6

== Results ==
=== Round of 32 ===
Men's
Date	Winners	Score	Opponent	Ref.
9/9/2020	(Spain) Adrián Blanco (Spain) Javier Martinez Vazquez	6–4 / 7–6	(Spain) Javier Barahona (Spain) Jesus Moya	
9/9/2020	(Spain) José García Diestro (Spain) Victor Ruiz	2–6 / 6–3 / 6–4	(Spain) Christian Fuster (Spain) Gonzalo Rubio	
9/9/2020	(Spain) Juan Martín Díaz (Spain) Pincho Fernández	3–6 / 6–3 / 7–6	(Spain) Coki Nieto (Spain) Javi Rico	
9/9/2020	(Spain) Javi Ruiz (Spain) Uri Botello	7–6 / 6–4	(Spain) Álvaro Cepero (Spain) Pablo Lijó	
9/9/2020	(Chile) Javier Valdes (Argentina) Juan Manuel Restivo	6–2 / 6–4	(Argentina) German Tamame (Italy) Simone Cremona	
9/9/2020	(Spain) Gaspar Campos (Spain) Teodoro Zapata	6–1 / 4–6 / 6–1	(Argentina) Andrés Britos (Italy) Michele Bruno	
9/9/2020	(Argentina) Adrián Allemandi (Spain) Momo González	6–4 / 6–4	(Spain) Antonio Luque (Spain) Jon Sanz	
9/9/2020	(Spain) Arturo Coello (Spain) Iván Ramírez	6–1 / 6–2	(Spain) Anton Sans (Spain) Iñigo Zaratiegui	
9/9/2020	(Argentina) Agustin Gomez Silingo (Argentina) Martín Di Nenno	6–1 / 6–1	(Argentina) Luciano Capra (Argentina) Ramiro Moyano	
9/9/2020	(Argentina) Federico Chingotto (Argentina) Juan Tello	6–1 / 3–6 / 6–3	(Spain) Francisco Gil Morales (Spain) Sergio Alba	
9/9/2020	(Brazil) Lucas Bergamini (Argentina) Miguel Lamperti	7–5 / 6–0	(Argentina) Agustin Gutiérrez (Argentina) Juan Cruz Belluati	
9/9/2020	(Spain) Ernesto Moreno (Spain) José Rico	6–4 / 6–1	(Argentina) Cristian Gutiérrez (Argentina) Maxi Grabiel	

Women's
Date	Winners	Score	Opponent	Ref.
9/9/2020	(Spain) Ana Fernández de Ossó (Spain) Lucía Martínez	6–4 / 6–0	(Spain) Barbara Las Heras (Spain) Isabel Dominguez	
9/9/2020	(Argentina) Catalina Tenorio (Argentina) Julieta Bidahorria	6–2 / 6–3	(Spain) Alicia Blanco Rojo (Spain) Ariadna Cañellas	
9/9/2020	(Spain) Gemma Triay (Spain) Lucia Sainz	6–1 / 6–2	(Spain) Beatriz Caldera (Spain) Carmen Goenaga	
9/9/2020	(Spain) Elisabeth Amatriain (Spain) Patricia Llaguno	4–6 / 6–1 / 6–1	(France) Laura Clergue (France) Léa Godallier	
9/9/2020	(Portugal) Sofia Araújo (Argentina) Virginia Riera	6–4 / 6–1	(Italy) Emily Stellato (Italy) Erika Zanchetta	
9/9/2020	(Spain) Araceli Martinez (Argentina) Nela Brito	6–2 / 6–4	(Argentina) Celeste Paz (Spain) Marina Martinez Lobo	
9/9/2020	(France) Alix Collombon (Spain) Nicole Traviesa Mola	7–6 / 6–1	(Argentina) Martina Fassio Goyeneche (Spain) Patricia Martinez	
9/9/2020	(Spain) Lorena Alonso (Brazil) Raquel Piltcher	4–6 / 7–5 / 7–5	(Uruguay) Andreína De los Santos (Spain) Julia Polo Bautista	
9/9/2020	(Portugal) Ana Catarina Nogueira (Argentina) Delfina Brea	6–4 / 6–3	(Argentina) Aranzazu Osoro (Spain) Teresa Navarro	
9/9/2020	(Spain) Carolina Navarro (Argentina) Cecilia Reiter	6–1 / 6–2	(Spain) Marta Perez (Spain) Marta Quevedo	
9/9/2020	(Spain) Esther Carnicero (Spain) Melania Merino	7–6 / 6–1	(Italy) Carolina Orsi (Italy) Valentina Tommasi	
9/9/2020	(Spain) Anna Cortiles Tapia (Spain) Jessica Castelló	4–6 / 6–2 / 7–6	(Spain) Angela Caro Cantin (Spain) Nuria Rodríguez	

=== Round of 16 ===
Men's
Date	Winners	Score	Opponent	Ref.
10/9/2020	(Spain) Alejandro Galán (Spain) Juan Lebrón	6–0 / 6–3	(Spain) Adrián Blanco (Spain) Javier Martinez Vazquez	
10/9/2020	(Spain) Juan Martín Díaz (Spain) Pincho Fernández	6–2 / 7–6	(Spain) José García Diestro (Spain) Victor Ruiz	
10/9/2020	(Spain) Javi Ruiz (Spain) Uri Botello	7–5 / 6–3	(Chile) Javier Valdes (Argentina) Juan Manuel Restivo	
10/9/2020	(Spain) Matías Díaz (Argentina) Maxi Sánchez	6–4 / 6–3	(Spain) Gaspar Campos (Spain) Teodoro Zapata	
10/9/2020	(Argentina) Franco Stupaczuk (Argentina) Sanyo Gutiérrez	6–1 / 6–2	(Argentina) Adrián Allemandi (Spain) Momo González	
10/9/2020	(Argentina) Agustin Gomez Silingo (Argentina) Martín Di Nenno	7–6 / 6–4	(Spain) Arturo Coello (Spain) Iván Ramírez	
10/9/2020	(Argentina) Federico Chingotto (Argentina) Juan Tello	6–2 / 7–6	(Brazil) Lucas Bergamini (Argentina) Miguel Lamperti	
10/9/2020	(Argentina) Agustín Tapia (Argentina) Fernando Belasteguín	6–7 / 6–4 / 7–6	(Spain) Ernesto Moreno (Spain) José Rico	

Women's
Date	Winners	Score	Opponent	Ref.
10/9/2020	(Spain) Alejandra Salazar (Spain) Ariana Sánchez	6–3 / 6–0	(Spain) Ana Fernández de Ossó (Spain) Lucía Martínez	
10/9/2020	(Spain) Gemma Triay (Spain) Lucia Sainz	6–3 / 6–2	(Argentina) Catalina Tenorio (Argentina) Julieta Bidahorria	
10/9/2020	(Portugal) Sofia Araújo (Argentina) Virginia Riera	5–7 / 6–4 / 7–6	(Spain) Elisabeth Amatriain (Spain) Patricia Llaguno	
10/9/2020	(Spain) Bea González (Spain) Marta Ortega	7–6 / 6–1	(Spain) Araceli Martinez (Argentina) Nela Brito	
10/9/2020	(Spain) Majo Sánchez (Spain) Mapi Sánchez	7–5 / 6–1	(France) Alix Collombon (Spain) Nicole Traviesa Mola	
10/9/2020	(Portugal) Ana Catarina Nogueira (Argentina) Delfina Brea	6–1 / 6–4	(Spain) Lorena Alonso (Brazil) Raquel Piltcher	
10/9/2020	(Spain) Carolina Navarro (Argentina) Cecilia Reiter	7–5 / 4–6 / 6–4	(Spain) Esther Carnicero (Spain) Melania Merino	
10/9/2020	(Spain) Marta Marrero (Spain) Paula Josemaría	6–1 / 6–3	(Spain) Anna Cortiles Tapia (Spain) Jessica Castelló	

=== Quarter-Finals ===
Men's
Date	Winners	Score	Opponent	Ref.
11/9/2020	(Spain) Alejandro Galán (Spain) Juan Lebrón	6–3 / 6–2	(Spain) Juan Martín Díaz (Spain) Pincho Fernández	
11/9/2020	(Spain) Javi Ruiz (Spain) Uri Botello	6–1 / 7–6	(Spain) Matías Díaz (Argentina) Maxi Sánchez	
11/9/2020	(Argentina) Agustin Gomez Silingo (Argentina) Martín Di Nenno	6–2 / 2–6 / 7–6	(Argentina) Franco Stupaczuk (Argentina) Sanyo Gutiérrez	
11/9/2020	(Argentina) Agustín Tapia (Argentina) Fernando Belasteguín	7–5 / W.O.	(Argentina) Federico Chingotto (Argentina) Juan Tello	

Women's
Date	Winners	Score	Opponent	Ref.
11/9/2020	(Spain) Gemma Triay (Spain) Lucia Sainz	6–3 / 3–6 / 7–5	(Spain) Alejandra Salazar (Spain) Ariana Sánchez	
11/9/2020	(Spain) Bea González (Spain) Marta Ortega	5–7 / 6–3 / 6–3	(Portugal) Sofia Araújo (Argentina) Virginia Riera	
11/9/2020	(Spain) Majo Sánchez (Spain) Mapi Sánchez	6–1 / 6–4	(Portugal) Ana Catarina Nogueira (Argentina) Delfina Brea	
11/9/2020	(Spain) Marta Marrero (Spain) Paula Josemaría	W.O.	(Spain) Carolina Navarro (Argentina) Cecilia Reiter	

=== Semi-Finals ===
Men's
Date	Winners	Score	Opponent	Ref.
12/9/2020	(Spain) Javi Ruiz (Spain) Uri Botello	6–4 / 6–3	(Spain) Alejandro Galán (Spain) Juan Lebrón	
12/9/2020	(Argentina) Agustín Tapia (Argentina) Fernando Belasteguín	6–0 / 6–2	(Argentina) Agustin Gomez Silingo (Argentina) Martín Di Nenno	

Women's
Date	Winners	Score	Opponent	Ref.
12/9/2020	(Spain) Gemma Triay (Spain) Lucia Sainz	6–3 / 6–3	(Spain) Bea González (Spain) Marta Ortega	
12/9/2020	(Spain) Marta Marrero (Spain) Paula Josemaría	6–1 / 6–7 / 6–3	(Spain) Majo Sánchez (Spain) Mapi Sánchez	

=== Finals ===
Men's
Date	Winners	Score	Opponent	Ref.
13/9/2020	(Argentina) Agustín Tapia (Argentina) Fernando Belasteguín	6–1 / 6–4	(Spain) Javi Ruiz (Spain) Uri Botello	

Women's
Date	Winners	Score	Opponent	Ref.
13/9/2020	(Spain) Gemma Triay (Spain) Lucia Sainz	6–0 / 7–6	(Spain) Marta Marrero (Spain) Paula Josemaría	
