= 2020 WPT Adeslas Open =

World Padel Tour tournament held in Madrid, Spain

- Date: 2 – 9 August
- Edition: 18th (Note: The first twelve editions were held under the organization of the Padel Pro Tour.)
- Category: Open
- Location: Madrid, Spain
- Venue: Madrid Arena

Champions
- Men's doubles: (Spain) Alejandro Galán (Spain) Juan Lebrón
- Women's doubles: (Spain) Mapi Sánchez (Spain) Majo Sánchez

Chronology

The 2020 Adeslas Open (officially 2020 World Padel Tour Adeslas Open) was the fourth tournament of the eight season organized by World Padel Tour, the most prestigious padel circuit at the time.

In the women's category, as in the previous tournament, neither of the two highest-ranked pairs reached the final. The first finalists were the number three ranked pair, Bea González and Marta Ortega, who were repeating their final appearance after eliminating the world number one pair, Alejandra Salazar and Ariana Sánchez, in the semi-final. Their opponents were the number seven ranked pair and four-time world number one, Majo and Mapi Sánchez, who eliminated the number two and four ranked pairs on their way to the final. In the final, the twins Majo and Mapi defeated Bea and Ortega in three sets, winning their first title of the season and their second in Madrid (they had already won in 2015).

In the men's category, the number one and number seven ranked pairs by the FIP reached the final. Alejandro Galán and Juan Lebrón reached their fourth consecutive final after defeating the number four ranked pair, Franco Stupaczuk and Sanyo Gutiérrez, in the semi-final. Their opponents were Federico Chingotto and Juan Tello, who reached their second career final after eliminating the number two ranked pair, Pablo Lima and Paquito Navarro, in the semi-final. In the final, Galán and Lebrón defeated Chingotto and Tello in three sets, winning their third (consecutive) title of the season and their third title each in Madrid. With this victory, Galán and Lebrón also became the first pair to win three consecutive men's tournaments since Fernando Belasteguín and Pablo Lima did so at the end of 2017.

== Head-to-head record between teams ranked in the top 4 during the season ==
=== Men's ===
Record	Galán–Lebrón	Lima–Paquito	Sanyo–Stupaczuk	Díaz–Maxi
Galán–Lebrón	—	1–1	3–0	1–0
Lima–Paquito	1–1	—	—	1–0
Sanyo–Stupaczuk	0–3	—	—	—
Díaz–Maxi	0–1	0–1	—	—

=== Women's ===
Record	Ariana–Salazar	Josemaria–Marrero	Bea–Ortega	Gemma–Lucia	Former Pairs	Delfina–Nogueira
Ariana–Salazar	—	0–1	1–1	1–0		1–0
Josemaria–Marrero	1–0	—	—	1–1		—
Bea–Ortega	1–1	—	—	—		—
Gemma–Lucia	0–1	1–1	—	—		1–0
Former Pairs
Delfina–Nogueira	0–1	—	—	0–1		—

== Draws ==
=== Men's Bracket ===
Round of 32
1	(Spain) Galán / (Spain) Lebrón
Bye
(Spain) Coki / (Spain) J. Rico	6	1	2
(Spain) A. Ruiz / (Spain) M. Piñeiro	4	6	6
(Spain) J.G. Diestro / (Spain) V. Ruiz	7	6
(Spain) A. Blanco / (Spain) J. Martinez	6	2
(Argentina) M. Grabiel / (Spain) P. Fernández	6	4	5
6	(Spain) J. Ruiz / (Spain) U. Botello	4	6	7
5	(Argentina) Belasteguín / (Argentina) Tapia	6	6
(Spain) A. Santana / (Spain) G. Rubio	1	2
(Argentina) A. Silingo / (Argentina) Di Nenno	6	6
(Spain) Á. Cepero / (Spain) P. Lijó	4	3
Q	(Spain) Coello / (Spain) I. Ramírez	7	6
(Spain) N. Gadea / (Argentina) S. Nerone	6	3
Bye
4	(Argentina) Sanyo / (Argentina) Stupaczuk
3	(Argentina) M. Díaz / (Argentina) Maxi
Bye
Q	(Spain) J. Morillas / (Spain) J. Sanz	2	6
Q	(Argentina) A. Patiniotis / (Spain) M. Yanguas	6	7
(Argentina) F. Quiles / (Argentina) J.C. Belluati	3	1
(Spain) E. Moreno / (Spain) J. Rico	6	6
Q	(Spain) J. Serrano / (Spain) P.A. Martínez	4	1
7	(Argentina) F. Chingotto / (Argentina) J. Tello	6	6
8	(Brazil) L. Campagnolo / (Spain) J.M. Díaz	6	6
(Brazil) L. Bergamini / (Argentina) M. Lamperti	3	3
(Spain) J. Garrido / (Spain) J. Mieres	2	6
(Argentina) A. Allemandi / (Spain) Momo	6	7
(Argentina) A. Gutiérrez / (Argentina) C. Gutiérrez	4	6
(Uruguay) D. Ramos / (Argentina) R. Méndez	6	7
Bye
2	(Brazil) Lima / (Spain) Paquito

Round of 16
1	(Spain) Galán / (Spain) Lebrón	6	7
(Spain) A. Ruiz / (Spain) M. Piñeiro	3	6
(Spain) J.G. Diestro / (Spain) V. Ruiz	6	4	2
6	(Spain) J. Ruiz / (Spain) U. Botello	4	6	6
5	(Argentina) Belasteguín / (Argentina) Tapia	6	6
(Argentina) A. Silingo / (Argentina) Di Nenno	4	1
Q	(Spain) Coello / (Spain) I. Ramírez	3	4
4	(Argentina) Sanyo / (Argentina) Stupaczuk	6	6
3	(Argentina) M. Díaz / (Argentina) Maxi	6	6
Q	(Argentina) A. Patiniotis / (Spain) M. Yanguas	2	3
(Spain) E. Moreno / (Spain) J. Rico	5	4
7	(Argentina) F. Chingotto / (Argentina) J. Tello	7	6
8	(Brazil) L. Campagnolo / (Spain) J.M. Díaz	7	7
(Argentina) A. Allemandi / (Spain) Momo	6	6
(Uruguay) D. Ramos / (Argentina) R. Méndez	1	2
2	(Brazil) Lima / (Spain) Paquito	6	6

Quarter-Final
1	(Spain) Galán / (Spain) Lebrón	6	6
6	(Spain) J. Ruiz / (Spain) U. Botello	3	3
5	(Argentina) Belasteguín / (Argentina) Tapia	4	2
4	(Argentina) Sanyo / (Argentina) Stupaczuk	6	6
3	(Argentina) M. Díaz / (Argentina) Maxi	4	1
7	(Argentina) F. Chingotto / (Argentina) J. Tello	6	6
8	(Brazil) L. Campagnolo / (Spain) J.M. Díaz	2	7	2
2	(Brazil) Lima / (Spain) Paquito	6	6	6

Semi-Finals
1	(Spain) Galán / (Spain) Lebrón	7	1	7
4	(Argentina) Sanyo / (Argentina) Stupaczuk	5	6	5
7	(Argentina) F. Chingotto / (Argentina) J. Tello	2	6	7
2	(Brazil) Lima / (Spain) Paquito	6	3	6

Finals
1	(Spain) Galán / (Spain) Lebrón	6	6	6
7	(Argentina) F. Chingotto / (Argentina) J. Tello	7	1	4

=== Women's Bracket ===
Round of 32
1	(Spain) Ariana / (Spain) Salazar
Bye
(Spain) A. Galán / (Spain) V. Iglesias	3	6	3
(Portugal) S. Araújo / (Argentina) V. Riera	6	3	6
(Spain) S. Hernández / (Spain) T. Icardo	6	4	5
(Spain) A. Martinez / (Argentina) N. Brito	4	6	7
Q	(Uruguay) M. Drosdov / (Spain) R. Aguilar	2	1
6	(Portugal) A.C. Nogueira / (Argentina) D. Brea	6	6
5	(Spain) E. Amatriain / (Spain) P. Llaguno	6	6
(Spain) A.F. de Ossó / (Spain) L. Martínez	3	1
(France) A. Collombon / (Spain) N. Traviesa	7	7
(Spain) B. Caldera / (Spain) C. Goenaga	6	6
(Spain) L. Rufo / (Spain) M. Talavan
(Spain) C. Mesa / (Argentina) C. Paz
Bye
3	(Spain) Bea González / (Spain) M. Ortega
4	(Spain) Gemma / (Spain) L. Sainz
Bye
Q	(Uruguay) A. De los Santos / (Spain) J. Bautista
Q	(France) L. Clergue / (France) L. Godallier
Q	(Spain) B. Las Heras / (Spain) I. Dominguez	7	6
(Argentina) A. Osoro / (Spain) T. Navarro	6	4
(Spain) A. Cantin / (Spain) N. Rodríguez	5	6	3
8	(Spain) C. Navarro / (Argentina) C. Reiter	7	4	6
7	(Spain) Majo / (Spain) Mapi	6	6
(Spain) M. Villalba / (Spain) V. Virseda	0	1
(Spain) A. Blanco / (Argentina) C. Tenorio	1	4
(Spain) E. Carnicero / (Spain) M. Merino	6	6
(Spain) A. Tapia / (Spain) J. Castelló	5	6	6
(Spain) L. Alonso / (Brazil) R. Piltcher	7	4	2
Bye
2	(Spain) M. Marrero / (Spain) P. Josemaría

Round of 16
1	(Spain) Ariana / (Spain) Salazar	6	6
(Portugal) S. Araújo / (Argentina) V. Riera	2	2
(Spain) A. Martinez / (Argentina) N. Brito	3	3
6	(Portugal) A.C. Nogueira / (Argentina) D. Brea	6	6
5	(Spain) E. Amatriain / (Spain) P. Llaguno	6	6
(Spain) B. Caldera / (Spain) C. Goenaga	2	2
(Spain) C. Mesa / (Argentina) C. Paz	0	4
3	(Spain) Bea González / (Spain) M. Ortega	6	6
4	(Spain) Gemma / (Spain) L. Sainz	6	6
Q	(France) L. Clergue / (France) L. Godallier	2	1
Q	(Spain) B. Las Heras / (Spain) I. Dominguez	2	6	1
8	(Spain) C. Navarro / (Argentina) C. Reiter	6	4	6
7	(Spain) Majo / (Spain) Mapi	6	6
(Spain) E. Carnicero / (Spain) M. Merino	0	4
(Spain) A. Tapia / (Spain) J. Castelló	0	4
2	(Spain) M. Marrero / (Spain) P. Josemaría	6	6

Quarter-Final
1	(Spain) Ariana / (Spain) Salazar	6	6
6	(Portugal) A.C. Nogueira / (Argentina) D. Brea	2	0
5	(Spain) E. Amatriain / (Spain) P. Llaguno	3	4
3	(Spain) Bea González / (Spain) M. Ortega	6	6
4	(Spain) Gemma / (Spain) L. Sainz	6	6
8	(Spain) C. Navarro / (Argentina) C. Reiter	3	3
7	(Spain) Majo / (Spain) Mapi	4	6	6
2	(Spain) M. Marrero / (Spain) P. Josemaría	6	3	3

Semi-Finals
1	(Spain) Ariana / (Spain) Salazar	6	5	6
3	(Spain) Bea González / (Spain) M. Ortega	4	7	7
4	(Spain) Gemma / (Spain) L. Sainz	7	3	2
7	(Spain) Majo / (Spain) Mapi	6	6	6

Finals
3	(Spain) Bea González / (Spain) M. Ortega	6	4	4
7	(Spain) Majo / (Spain) Mapi	4	6	6

== Results ==
=== Round of 32 ===
Men's
Date	Winners	Score	Opponent	Ref.
5/8/2020	(Spain) Alejandro Ruiz (Spain) Martin Sánchez Piñeiro	4–6 / 6–1 / 6–2	(Spain) Coki Nieto (Spain) Javi Rico	
5/8/2020	(Spain) José García Diestro (Spain) Victor Ruiz	7–6 / 6–2	(Spain) Adrián Blanco (Spain) Javier Martinez Vazquez	
5/8/2020	(Spain) Javi Ruiz (Spain) Uri Botello	4–6 / 6–4 / 7–5	(Argentina) Maxi Grabiel (Spain) Pincho Fernández	
5/8/2020	(Argentina) Agustín Tapia (Argentina) Fernando Belasteguín	6–1 / 6–2	(Spain) Aday Santana (Spain) Gonzalo Rubio	
5/8/2020	(Argentina) Agustin Gomez Silingo (Argentina) Martín Di Nenno	6–4 / 6–3	(Spain) Álvaro Cepero (Spain) Pablo Lijó	
5/8/2020	(Spain) Arturo Coello (Spain) Iván Ramírez	7–6 / 6–3	(Spain) Nacho Gadea (Argentina) Sebastián Nerone	
5/8/2020	(Argentina) Aris Patiniotis (Spain) Mike Yanguas	6–2 / 7–6	(Spain) Javier Pérez Morillas (Spain) Jon Sanz	
5/8/2020	(Spain) Ernesto Moreno (Spain) José Rico	6–3 / 6–1	(Argentina) Federico Quiles (Argentina) Juan Cruz Belluati	
5/8/2020	(Argentina) Federico Chingotto (Argentina) Juan Tello	6–4 / 6–1	(Spain) José Sánchez Serrano (Spain) Pedro Alonso Martínez	
5/8/2020	(Spain) Juan Martín Díaz (Brazil) Lucas Campagnolo	6–3 / 6–3	(Brazil) Lucas Bergamini (Argentina) Miguel Lamperti	
5/8/2020	(Argentina) Adrián Allemandi (Spain) Momo González	6–2 / 7–6	(Spain) Javi Garrido (Spain) Juani Mieres	
5/8/2020	(Uruguay) Diego Ramos (Spain) Rafael Méndez	6–4 / 7–6	(Argentina) Agustin Gutiérrez (Argentina) Cristian Gutiérrez	

Women's
Date	Winners	Score	Opponent	Ref.
5/8/2020	(Portugal) Sofia Araújo (Argentina) Virginia Riera	6–3 / 3–6 / 6–3	(Spain) Alba Galán (Spain) Victoria Iglesias	
5/8/2020	(Spain) Araceli Martinez (Argentina) Nela Brito	4–6 / 6–4 / 7–5	(Spain) Sandra Hernández (Spain) Tamara Icardo	
5/8/2020	(Portugal) Ana Catarina Nogueira (Argentina) Delfina Brea	6–2 / 6–1	(Uruguay) Manuela Alaga Drosdov (Spain) Raquel Aguilar	
5/8/2020	(Spain) Elisabeth Amatriain (Spain) Patricia Llaguno	6–3 / 6–1	(Spain) Ana Fernández de Ossó (Spain) Lucía Martínez	
5/8/2020	(France) Alix Collombon (Spain) Nicole Traviesa Mola	7–6 / 7–6	(Spain) Beatriz Caldera (Spain) Carmen Goenaga	
5/8/2020	(Spain) Carla Mesa (Argentina) Celeste Paz	7–5 / 6–3	(Spain) Lorena Rufo (Spain) Marta Talavan	
5/8/2020	(France) Laura Clergue (France) Léa Godallier	6–1 / 7–6	(Uruguay) Andreína De los Santos (Spain) Julia Polo Bautista	
5/8/2020	(Spain) Barbara Las Heras (Spain) Isabel Dominguez	7–6 / 6–4	(Argentina) Aranzazu Osoro (Spain) Teresa Navarro	
5/8/2020	(Spain) Carolina Navarro (Argentina) Cecilia Reiter	7–5 / 4–6 / 6–3	(Spain) Angela Caro Cantin (Spain) Nuria Rodríguez	
5/8/2020	(Spain) Majo Sánchez (Spain) Mapi Sánchez	6–0 / 6–1	(Spain) Maria Villalba (Spain) Verónica Virseda	
5/8/2020	(Spain) Esther Carnicero (Spain) Melania Merino	6–1 / 6–4	(Spain) Alicia Blanco Rojo (Argentina) Catalina Tenorio	
5/8/2020	(Spain) Anna Cortiles Tapia (Spain) Jessica Castelló	5–7 / 6–4 / 6–2	(Spain) Lorena Alonso (Brazil) Raquel Piltcher	

=== Round of 16 ===
Men's
Date	Winners	Score	Opponent	Ref.
6/8/2020	(Spain) Alejandro Galán (Spain) Juan Lebrón	6–3 / 7–6	(Spain) Alejandro Ruiz (Spain) Martin Sánchez Piñeiro	
6/8/2020	(Spain) Javi Ruiz (Spain) Uri Botello	4–6 / 6–4 / 6–2	(Spain) José García Diestro (Spain) Victor Ruiz	
6/8/2020	(Argentina) Agustín Tapia (Argentina) Fernando Belasteguín	6–4 / 6–1	(Argentina) Agustin Gomez Silingo (Argentina) Martín Di Nenno	
6/8/2020	(Argentina) Franco Stupaczuk (Argentina) Sanyo Gutiérrez	6–3 / 6–4	(Spain) Arturo Coello (Spain) Iván Ramírez	
6/8/2020	(Spain) Matías Díaz (Argentina) Maxi Sánchez	6–2 / 6–3	(Argentina) Aris Patiniotis (Spain) Mike Yanguas	
6/8/2020	(Argentina) Federico Chingotto (Argentina) Juan Tello	7–5 / 6–4	(Spain) Ernesto Moreno (Spain) José Rico	
6/8/2020	(Spain) Juan Martín Díaz (Brazil) Lucas Campagnolo	7–6 / 7–6	(Argentina) Adrián Allemandi (Spain) Momo González	
6/8/2020	(Brazil) Pablo Lima (Spain) Paquito Navarro	6–1 / 6–2	(Uruguay) Diego Ramos (Spain) Rafael Méndez	

Women's
Date	Winners	Score	Opponent	Ref.
6/8/2020	(Spain) Alejandra Salazar (Spain) Ariana Sánchez	6–2 / 6–2	(Portugal) Sofia Araújo (Argentina) Virginia Riera	
6/8/2020	(Portugal) Ana Catarina Nogueira (Argentina) Delfina Brea	6–3 / 6–3	(Spain) Araceli Martinez (Argentina) Nela Brito	
6/8/2020	(Spain) Elisabeth Amatriain (Spain) Patricia Llaguno	6–2 / 6–2	(France) Alix Collombon (Spain) Nicole Traviesa Mola	
6/8/2020	(Spain) Bea González (Spain) Marta Ortega	6–0 / 6–4	(Spain) Carla Mesa (Argentina) Celeste Paz	
6/8/2020	(Spain) Gemma Triay (Spain) Lucia Sainz	6–2 / 6–1	(France) Laura Clergue (France) Léa Godallier	
6/8/2020	(Spain) Carolina Navarro (Argentina) Cecilia Reiter	6–2 / 4–6 / 6–1	(Spain) Barbara Las Heras (Spain) Isabel Dominguez	
6/8/2020	(Spain) Majo Sánchez (Spain) Mapi Sánchez	6–0 / 6–4	(Spain) Esther Carnicero (Spain) Melania Merino	
6/8/2020	(Spain) Marta Marrero (Spain) Paula Josemaría	6–0 / 6–4	(Spain) Anna Cortiles Tapia (Spain) Jessica Castelló	

=== Quarter-Finals ===
Men's
Date	Winners	Score	Opponent	Ref.
7/8/2020	(Spain) Alejandro Galán (Spain) Juan Lebrón	6–3 / 6–3	(Spain) Javi Ruiz (Spain) Uri Botello	
7/8/2020	(Argentina) Franco Stupaczuk (Argentina) Sanyo Gutiérrez	6–4 / 6–2	(Argentina) Agustín Tapia (Argentina) Fernando Belasteguín	
7/8/2020	(Argentina) Federico Chingotto (Argentina) Juan Tello	6–4 / 6–1	(Spain) Matías Díaz (Argentina) Maxi Sánchez	
7/8/2020	(Brazil) Pablo Lima (Spain) Paquito Navarro	6–2 / 6–7 / 6–2	(Spain) Juan Martín Díaz (Brazil) Lucas Campagnolo	

Women's
Date	Winners	Score	Opponent	Ref.
7/8/2020	(Spain) Alejandra Salazar (Spain) Ariana Sánchez	6–2 / 6–0	(Portugal) Ana Catarina Nogueira (Argentina) Delfina Brea	
7/8/2020	(Spain) Bea González (Spain) Marta Ortega	6–3 / 6–4	(Spain) Elisabeth Amatriain (Spain) Patricia Llaguno	
7/8/2020	(Spain) Gemma Triay (Spain) Lucia Sainz	6–3 / 6–3	(Spain) Carolina Navarro (Argentina) Cecilia Reiter	
7/8/2020	(Spain) Majo Sánchez (Spain) Mapi Sánchez	4–6 / 6–3 / 6–3	(Spain) Marta Marrero (Spain) Paula Josemaría	

=== Semi-Finals ===
Men's
Date	Winners	Score	Opponent	Ref.
8/8/2020	(Spain) Alejandro Galán (Spain) Juan Lebrón	7–5 / 1–6 / 7–5	(Argentina) Franco Stupaczuk (Argentina) Sanyo Gutiérrez	
8/8/2020	(Argentina) Federico Chingotto (Argentina) Juan Tello	2–6 / 6–3 / 7–6	(Brazil) Pablo Lima (Spain) Paquito Navarro	

Women's
Date	Winners	Score	Opponent	Ref.
8/8/2020	(Spain) Bea González (Spain) Marta Ortega	4–6 / 7–5 / 7–6	(Spain) Alejandra Salazar (Spain) Ariana Sánchez	
8/8/2020	(Spain) Majo Sánchez (Spain) Mapi Sánchez	6–7 / 6–3 / 6–2	(Spain) Gemma Triay (Spain) Lucia Sainz	

=== Finals ===
Men's
Date	Winners	Score	Opponent	Ref.
9/8/2020	(Spain) Alejandro Galán (Spain) Juan Lebrón	6–7 / 6–1 / 6–4	(Argentina) Federico Chingotto (Argentina) Juan Tello	

Women's
Date	Winners	Score	Opponent	Ref.
9/8/2020	(Spain) Majo Sánchez (Spain) Mapi Sánchez	4–6 / 6–4 / 6–4	(Spain) Bea González (Spain) Marta Ortega	
