= 2020 WPT Valencia Open =

World Padel Tour tournament held in Valencia, Spain

- Date: 30 August – 6 September
- Edition: 13th (Note: The first sixth editions were held under the organization of the Padel Pro Tour, while the 10th and 11th we're Master's.)
- Category: Open
- Location: Valencia, Spain
- Venue: Pavelló Municipal Font de Sant Lluís

Champions
- Men's doubles: (Spain) Alejandro Galán (Spain) Juan Lebrón
- Women's doubles: (Spain) Alejandra Salazar (Spain) Ariana Sánchez

Chronology

The 2020 Valencia Open (officially 2020 World Padel Tour Estrella Damm Valencia Open) was the fifth tournament of the eight season organized by World Padel Tour, the most prestigious padel circuit at the time.

In the women's category, for the second time this season, the two highest-ranked pairs reached the final. The first finalists were the number one ranked pair, Alejandra Salazar and Ariana Sánchez, who defeated the number four ranked pair, the twins Majo and Mapi Sánchez, to reach their third final of the year. Their rivals would be the second-ranked pair, Marta Marrero and Paula Josemaria, who defeated the number three ranked pair, Bea González and Marta Ortega, to reach their second final of the year. In the final, Ariana and Salazar defeated Josemaria and Marrero in two sets, thus avenging their defeat in the Marbella final, and winning their second title of the season and the pair's first in Valencia (the fourth for Salazar, who had already won in 2013, 2015, and 2016).

In the men's category, the final of the previous tournament was repeated, with both the number one and number seven FIP ranked pairs reaching the final. Alejandro Galán and Juan Lebrón reached their fifth consecutive final after defeating the number four ranked pair, Franco Stupaczuk and Sanyo Gutiérrez, in the semi-final. Their opponents were Federico Chingotto and Juan Tello, who reached their third career final after eliminating the number three ranked pair, Agustín Tapia and Fernando Belasteguín, in the semi-final. In the final, Galán and Lebrón defeated Chingotto and Tello in two sets, winning their fourth (consecutive) title of the season, with Galán successfully defending the title he won in Valencia the previous year (the first for Lebrón). With this victory, Galán and Lebrón also became the first duo since Fernando Belasteguín and Pablo Lima, in July 2016, to win four consecutive titles and with a season record of 21 games and 20 wins.

== Head-to-head record between teams ranked in the top 4 during the season ==
=== Men's ===
Record	Galán–Lebrón	Lima–Paquito	Belasteguín–Tapia	Sanyo–Stupaczuk	Former Pairs	Díaz–Maxi
Galán–Lebrón	—	1–1	1–0	4–0		1–0
Lima–Paquito	1–1	—	0–1	—		1–0
Belasteguín–Tapia	0–1	1–0	—	0–2		0–1
Sanyo–Stupaczuk	0–4	—	2–0	—		—
Former Pairs
Díaz–Maxi	0–1	0–1	1–0	—		—

=== Women's ===
Record	Ariana–Salazar	Josemaria–Marrero	Bea–Ortega	Majo–Mapi	Former Pairs	Gemma–Lucia	Delfina–Nogueira
Ariana–Salazar	—	1–1	1–1	1–0		1–0	1–0
Josemaria–Marrero	1–1	—	1–0	1–1		2–1	—
Bea–Ortega	1–1	0–1	—	2–1		—	—
Majo–Mapi	0–1	1–1	1–2	—		1–0	—
Former Pairs
Gemma–Lucia	0–1	1–2	—	0–1		—	1–0
Delfina–Nogueira	0–1	—	—	—		0–1	—

== Draws ==
=== Men's Bracket ===
Round of 32
1	(Spain) Galán / (Spain) Lebrón
Bye
Q	(Brazil) C. Gomes / (Argentina) Godo Díaz	2	5
Q	(Spain) Coello / (Spain) I. Ramírez	6	7
LL	(Argentina) D. Perino / (Spain) J. Gutiérrez	7	3	6
Q	(Argentina) A. Patiniotis / (Spain) M. Yanguas	5	6	3
(Argentina) C. Gutiérrez / (Argentina) M. Grabiel	2	6	7
8	(Portugal) D. Rocha / (Spain) J.M. Díaz	6	3	6
6	(Spain) J. Ruiz / (Spain) U. Botello	6	3
(Brazil) L. Bergamini / (Argentina) M. Lamperti	7	6
(Argentina) A. Allemandi / (Spain) Momo	6	6
(Spain) E. Moreno / (Spain) J. Rico	2	4
(Spain) Á. Cepero / (Spain) P. Lijó	7	4	6
Q	(Spain) A. Arroyo / (Spain) S. Oria	5	6	3
Bye
4	(Argentina) Sanyo / (Argentina) Stupaczuk
3	(Argentina) Belasteguín / (Argentina) Tapia
Bye
(Spain) N. Gadea / (Argentina) S. Nerone	2	1
(Argentina) A. Silingo / (Argentina) Di Nenno	6	6
(Spain) J.G. Diestro / (Spain) V. Ruiz	5	1
(Spain) Coki / (Spain) J. Rico	7	6
(Spain) J. Garrido / (Spain) J. Mieres	1	2
5	(Argentina) M. Díaz / (Argentina) Maxi	6	6
7	(Argentina) F. Chingotto / (Argentina) J. Tello	6	6
(Spain) A. Blanco / (Spain) J. Martinez	3	3
(Spain) C. Fuster / (Spain) G. Rubio	4	4
(Argentina) A. Gutiérrez / (Argentina) J.C. Belluati	6	6
(Spain) A. Santana / (Argentina) F. Quiles	2	6
(Argentina) L. Capra / (Argentina) R. Moyano
Bye
2	(Brazil) Lima / (Spain) Paquito

Round of 16
1	(Spain) Galán / (Spain) Lebrón	6	6
Q	(Spain) Coello / (Spain) I. Ramírez	0	3
LL	(Argentina) D. Perino / (Spain) J. Gutiérrez	6	6
(Argentina) C. Gutiérrez / (Argentina) M. Grabiel	2	3
(Brazil) L. Bergamini / (Argentina) M. Lamperti	6	6
(Argentina) A. Allemandi / (Spain) Momo	3	3
(Spain) Á. Cepero / (Spain) P. Lijó	1	6
4	(Argentina) Sanyo / (Argentina) Stupaczuk	6	7
3	(Argentina) Belasteguín / (Argentina) Tapia	6	7
(Argentina) A. Silingo / (Argentina) Di Nenno	3	5
(Spain) Coki / (Spain) J. Rico	6	4	6
5	(Argentina) M. Díaz / (Argentina) Maxi	4	6	4
7	(Argentina) F. Chingotto / (Argentina) J. Tello	6	1	6
(Argentina) A. Gutiérrez / (Argentina) J.C. Belluati	2	6	2
(Argentina) L. Capra / (Argentina) R. Moyano	2	5
2	(Brazil) Lima / (Spain) Paquito	6	7

Quarter-Final
1	(Spain) Galán / (Spain) Lebrón	6	7
(Argentina) D. Perino / (Spain) J. Gutiérrez	0	5
(Brazil) L. Bergamini / (Argentina) M. Lamperti	1	6	4
4	(Argentina) Sanyo / (Argentina) Stupaczuk	6	1	6
3	(Argentina) Belasteguín / (Argentina) Tapia	6	6	7
(Spain) Coki / (Spain) J. Rico	7	2	6
7	(Argentina) F. Chingotto / (Argentina) J. Tello	*
2	(Brazil) Lima / (Spain) Paquito

Semi-Finals
1	(Spain) Galán / (Spain) Lebrón	7	7
4	(Argentina) Sanyo / (Argentina) Stupaczuk	6	6
3	(Argentina) Belasteguín / (Argentina) Tapia	4	3
7	(Argentina) F. Chingotto / (Argentina) J. Tello	6	6

Finals
1	(Spain) Galán / (Spain) Lebrón	6	7
7	(Argentina) F. Chingotto / (Argentina) J. Tello	3	6

=== Women's Bracket ===
Round of 32
1	(Spain) Ariana / (Spain) Salazar
Bye
(Spain) B. Caldera / (Spain) C. Goenaga	6	6
LL	(Spain) M Borrero / (Spain) N. Vivancos	1	3
(Argentina) C. Tenorio / (Argentina) J. Bidahorria	6	6
Q	(France) L. Clergue / (France) L. Godallier	4	3
(Spain) A. Galán / (Spain) V. Iglesias	7	7
7	(Portugal) A.C. Nogueira / (Argentina) D. Brea	5	6
8	(Spain) C. Navarro / (Argentina) C. Reiter	2	5
Q	(Spain) L. Rufo / (Spain) M. Talavan	6	7
Q	(Spain) B. Las Heras / (Spain) I. Dominguez	4	6	7
(Spain) A. Martinez / (Argentina) N. Brito	6	3	6
(Spain) C. Mesa / (Argentina) C. Paz	6	6
(Spain) E. Carnicero / (Spain) M. Merino	1	3
Bye
4	(Spain) Majo / (Spain) Mapi
3	(Spain) Bea González / (Spain) M. Ortega
Bye
(Portugal) S. Araújo / (Argentina) V. Riera	3	2
(France) A. Collombon / (Spain) N. Traviesa	6	6
(Spain) A. Cantin / (Spain) N. Rodríguez	3	6	6
(Spain) S. Hernández / (Spain) T. Icardo	6	4	4
(Spain) A. Tapia / (Spain) J. Castelló	3	4
6	(Spain) E. Amatriain / (Spain) P. Llaguno	6	6
5	(Spain) Gemma / (Spain) L. Sainz	6	6
(Spain) A. Blanco / (Spain) A. Cañellas	0	3
(Argentina) A. Osoro / (Spain) T. Navarro	6	6
Q	(Spain) C. García / (Spain) M. Caparros	0	4
(Spain) L. Alonso / (Brazil) R. Piltcher	1	0
(Spain) A.F. de Ossó / (Spain) L. Martínez	6	6
Bye
2	(Spain) M. Marrero / (Spain) P. Josemaría

Round of 16
1	(Spain) Ariana / (Spain) Salazar	6	6
(Spain) B. Caldera / (Spain) C. Goenaga	1	2
(Argentina) C. Tenorio / (Argentina) J. Bidahorria	5	3
(Spain) A. Galán / (Spain) V. Iglesias	7	6
Q	(Spain) L. Rufo / (Spain) M. Talavan	3	6	6
Q	(Spain) B. Las Heras / (Spain) I. Dominguez	6	4	3
(Spain) C. Mesa / (Argentina) C. Paz	6	3
4	(Spain) Majo / (Spain) Mapi	7	6
3	(Spain) Bea González / (Spain) M. Ortega	7	6
(France) A. Collombon / (Spain) N. Traviesa	5	3
(Spain) A. Cantin / (Spain) N. Rodríguez	4	0
6	(Spain) E. Amatriain / (Spain) P. Llaguno	6	6
5	(Spain) Gemma / (Spain) L. Sainz	7	6
(Argentina) A. Osoro / (Spain) T. Navarro	6	1
(Spain) A.F. de Ossó / (Spain) L. Martínez	3	3
2	(Spain) M. Marrero / (Spain) P. Josemaría	6	6

Quarter-Final
1	(Spain) Ariana / (Spain) Salazar	6	6
(Spain) A. Galán / (Spain) V. Iglesias	2	1
(Spain) L. Rufo / (Spain) M. Talavan	1	2
4	(Spain) Majo / (Spain) Mapi	6	6
3	(Spain) Bea González / (Spain) M. Ortega	7	6
6	(Spain) E. Amatriain / (Spain) P. Llaguno	6	3
5	(Spain) Gemma / (Spain) L. Sainz	4	4
2	(Spain) M. Marrero / (Spain) P. Josemaría	6	6

Semi-Finals
1	(Spain) Ariana / (Spain) Salazar	6	7
4	(Spain) Majo / (Spain) Mapi	4	6
3	(Spain) Bea González / (Spain) M. Ortega	5	2
2	(Spain) M. Marrero / (Spain) P. Josemaría	7	6

Finals
1	(Spain) Ariana / (Spain) Salazar	7	7
2	(Spain) M. Marrero / (Spain) P. Josemaría	5	6

== Results ==
=== Round of 32 ===
Men's
Date	Winners	Score	Opponent	Ref.
2/9/2020	(Spain) Arturo Coello (Spain) Iván Ramírez	6–2 / 7–5	(Argentina) Godo Díaz (Brazil) Franscico Gomes	
2/9/2020	(Argentina) Denis Perino (Spain) Jorge Ruiz Gutiérrez	7–5 / 3–6 / 6–3	(Argentina) Aris Patiniotis (Spain) Mike Yanguas	
2/9/2020	(Argentina) Cristian Gutiérrez (Argentina) Maxi Grabiel	2–6 / 6–3 / 7–6	(Portugal) Diogo Rocha (Spain) Juan Martín Díaz	
2/9/2020	(Brazil) Lucas Bergamini (Argentina) Miguel Lamperti	7–6 / 6–3	(Spain) Javi Ruiz (Spain) Uri Botello	
2/9/2020	(Argentina) Adrián Allemandi (Spain) Momo González	6–2 / 6–4	(Spain) Ernesto Moreno (Spain) José Rico	
2/9/2020	(Spain) Álvaro Cepero (Spain) Pablo Lijó	7–5 / 4–6 / 6–3	(Spain) Alejandro Arroyo (Spain) Salvador Oria	
2/9/2020	(Argentina) Agustin Gomez Silingo (Argentina) Martín Di Nenno	6–2 / 6–1	(Spain) Nacho Gadea (Argentina) Sebastián Nerone	
2/9/2020	(Spain) Coki Nieto (Spain) Javi Rico	7–5 / 6–1	(Spain) José García Diestro (Spain) Victor Ruiz	
2/9/2020	(Spain) Matías Díaz (Argentina) Maxi Sánchez	6–1 / 6–2	(Spain) Javi Garrido (Spain) Juani Mieres	
2/9/2020	(Argentina) Federico Chingotto (Argentina) Juan Tello	6–3 / 6–3	(Spain) Adrián Blanco (Spain) Javier Martinez Vazquez	
2/9/2020	(Argentina) Agustin Gutiérrez (Argentina) Juan Cruz Belluati	6–4 / 6–4	(Spain) Christian Fuster (Spain) Gonzalo Rubio	
2/9/2020	(Argentina) Luciano Capra (Argentina) Ramiro Moyano	6–2 / 7–6	(Spain) Aday Santana (Argentina) Federico Quiles	

Women's
Date	Winners	Score	Opponent	Ref.
2/9/2020	(Spain) Beatriz Caldera (Spain) Carmen Goenaga	6–1 / 6–3	(Spain) Marta Borrero (Spain) Nuria Vivancos	
2/9/2020	(Argentina) Catalina Tenorio (Argentina) Julieta Bidahorria	6–4 / 6–3	(France) Laura Clergue (France) Léa Godallier	
2/9/2020	(Spain) Alba Galán (Spain) Victoria Iglesias	7–5 / 7–6	(Portugal) Ana Catarina Nogueira (Argentina) Delfina Brea	
2/9/2020	(Spain) Lorena Rufo (Spain) Marta Talavan	6–2 / 7–5	(Spain) Carolina Navarro (Argentina) Cecilia Reiter	
2/9/2020	(Spain) Barbara Las Heras (Spain) Isabel Dominguez	4–6 / 6–3 / 7–6	(Spain) Araceli Martinez (Argentina) Nela Brito	
2/9/2020	(Spain) Carla Mesa (Argentina) Celeste Paz	6–1 / 6–3	(Spain) Esther Carnicero (Spain) Melania Merino	
2/9/2020	(France) Alix Collombon (Spain) Nicole Traviesa Mola	6–3 / 6–2	(Portugal) Sofia Araújo (Argentina) Virginia Riera	
2/9/2020	(Spain) Angela Caro Cantin (Spain) Nuria Rodríguez	3–6 / 6–4 / 6–4	(Spain) Sandra Hernández (Spain) Tamara Icardo	
2/9/2020	(Spain) Elisabeth Amatriain (Spain) Patricia Llaguno	6–3 / 6–4	(Spain) Anna Cortiles Tapia (Spain) Jessica Castelló	
2/9/2020	(Spain) Gemma Triay (Spain) Lucia Sainz	6–0 / 6–3	(Spain) Alicia Blanco Rojo (Spain) Ariadna Cañellas	
2/9/2020	(Argentina) Aranzazu Osoro (Spain) Teresa Navarro	6–0 / 6–4	(Spain) Carmen García Pardo (Spain) Marta Caparros	
2/9/2020	(Spain) Ana Fernández de Ossó (Spain) Lucía Martínez	6–1 / 6–0	(Spain) Lorena Alonso (Brazil) Raquel Piltcher	

=== Round of 16 ===
Men's
Date	Winners	Score	Opponent	Ref.
3/9/2020	(Spain) Alejandro Galán (Spain) Juan Lebrón	6–0 / 6–3	(Spain) Arturo Coello (Spain) Iván Ramírez	
3/9/2020	(Argentina) Denis Perino (Spain) Jorge Ruiz Gutiérrez	6–2 / 6–3	(Argentina) Cristian Gutiérrez (Argentina) Maxi Grabiel	
3/9/2020	(Brazil) Lucas Bergamini (Argentina) Miguel Lamperti	6–3 / 6–3	(Argentina) Adrián Allemandi (Spain) Momo González	
3/9/2020	(Argentina) Franco Stupaczuk (Argentina) Sanyo Gutiérrez	6–1 / 7–6	(Spain) Álvaro Cepero (Spain) Pablo Lijó	
3/9/2020	(Argentina) Agustín Tapia (Argentina) Fernando Belasteguín	6–3 / 7–5	(Argentina) Agustin Gomez Silingo (Argentina) Martín Di Nenno	
3/9/2020	(Spain) Coki Nieto (Spain) Javi Rico	6–4 / 4–6 / 6–4	(Spain) Matías Díaz (Argentina) Maxi Sánchez	
3/9/2020	(Argentina) Federico Chingotto (Argentina) Juan Tello	6–2 / 1–6 / 6–2	(Argentina) Agustin Gutiérrez (Argentina) Juan Cruz Belluati	
3/9/2020	(Brazil) Pablo Lima (Spain) Paquito Navarro	6–2 / 7–5	(Argentina) Luciano Capra (Argentina) Ramiro Moyano	

Women's
Date	Winners	Score	Opponent	Ref.
3/9/2020	(Spain) Alejandra Salazar (Spain) Ariana Sánchez	6–1 / 6–2	(Spain) Beatriz Caldera (Spain) Carmen Goenaga	
3/9/2020	(Spain) Alba Galán (Spain) Victoria Iglesias	7–5 / 6–3	(Argentina) Catalina Tenorio (Argentina) Julieta Bidahorria	
3/9/2020	(Spain) Lorena Rufo (Spain) Marta Talavan	3–6 / 6–4 / 6–3	(Spain) Barbara Las Heras (Spain) Isabel Dominguez	
3/9/2020	(Spain) Majo Sánchez (Spain) Mapi Sánchez	7–6 / 6–3	(Spain) Carla Mesa (Argentina) Celeste Paz	
3/9/2020	(Spain) Bea González (Spain) Marta Ortega	7–5 / 6–2	(France) Alix Collombon (Spain) Nicole Traviesa Mola	
3/9/2020	(Spain) Elisabeth Amatriain (Spain) Patricia Llaguno	6–4 / 6–0	(Spain) Angela Caro Cantin (Spain) Nuria Rodríguez	
3/9/2020	(Spain) Gemma Triay (Spain) Lucia Sainz	7–6 / 6–1	(Argentina) Aranzazu Osoro (Spain) Teresa Navarro	
3/9/2020	(Spain) Marta Marrero (Spain) Paula Josemaría	6–3 / 6–3	(Spain) Ana Fernández de Ossó (Spain) Lucía Martínez	

=== Quarter-Finals ===
Men's
Date	Winners	Score	Opponent	Ref.
4/9/2020	(Spain) Alejandro Galán (Spain) Juan Lebrón	6–0 / 7–5	(Argentina) Denis Perino (Spain) Jorge Ruiz Gutiérrez	
4/9/2020	(Argentina) Franco Stupaczuk (Argentina) Sanyo Gutiérrez	6–1 / 1–6 / 6–4	(Brazil) Lucas Bergamini (Argentina) Miguel Lamperti	
4/9/2020	(Argentina) Agustín Tapia (Argentina) Fernando Belasteguín	6–7 / 6–2 / 7–6	(Spain) Coki Nieto (Spain) Javi Rico	
4/9/2020	(Argentina) Federico Chingotto (Argentina) Juan Tello	W.O.	(Brazil) Pablo Lima (Spain) Paquito Navarro	

Women's
Date	Winners	Score	Opponent	Ref.
4/9/2020	(Spain) Alejandra Salazar (Spain) Ariana Sánchez	6–2 / 6–1	(Spain) Alba Galán (Spain) Victoria Iglesias	
4/9/2020	(Spain) Majo Sánchez (Spain) Mapi Sánchez	6–1 / 6–2	(Spain) Lorena Rufo (Spain) Marta Talavan	
4/9/2020	(Spain) Bea González (Spain) Marta Ortega	7–6 / 6–3	(Spain) Elisabeth Amatriain (Spain) Patricia Llaguno	
4/9/2020	(Spain) Marta Marrero (Spain) Paula Josemaría	6–4 / 6–4	(Spain) Gemma Triay (Spain) Lucia Sainz	

=== Semi-Finals ===
Men's
Date	Winners	Score	Opponent	Ref.
5/9/2020	(Spain) Alejandro Galán (Spain) Juan Lebrón	7–6 / 7–6	(Argentina) Franco Stupaczuk (Argentina) Sanyo Gutiérrez	
5/9/2020	(Argentina) Federico Chingotto (Argentina) Juan Tello	6–4 / 6–3	(Argentina) Agustín Tapia (Argentina) Fernando Belasteguín	

Women's
Date	Winners	Score	Opponent	Ref.
5/9/2020	(Spain) Alejandra Salazar (Spain) Ariana Sánchez	6–4 / 7–6	(Spain) Majo Sánchez (Spain) Mapi Sánchez	
5/9/2020	(Spain) Marta Marrero (Spain) Paula Josemaría	7–5 / 6–2	(Spain) Bea González (Spain) Marta Ortega	

=== Finals ===
Men's
Date	Winners	Score	Opponent	Ref.
6/9/2020	(Spain) Alejandro Galán (Spain) Juan Lebrón	6–3 / 7–6	(Argentina) Federico Chingotto (Argentina) Juan Tello	

Women's
Date	Winners	Score	Opponent	Ref.
6/9/2020	(Spain) Alejandra Salazar (Spain) Ariana Sánchez	7–5 / 7–6	(Spain) Marta Marrero (Spain) Paula Josemaría	
