= 2020 WPT Las Rozas Open =

World Padel Tour tournament held in Las Rozas, Spain

- Date: 18 – 22 November
- Edition: 2nd
- Category: Open
- Location: Las Rozas, Spain
- Venue: La Ciudad del Fútbol

Champions
- Men's doubles: (Argentina) Federico Chingotto (Argentina) Juan Tello
- Women's doubles: (Spain) Gemma Triay (Spain) Lucía Sainz

Chronology

The 2020 WPT Las Rozas Open (officially 2020 World Padel Tour Cupra Las Rozas Open) was the tenth tournament of the eight season organized by World Padel Tour, the most prestigious padel circuit at the time.

In the women's category, the number three and number five ranked pairs reached the final. The first finalists were the number three ranked pair, Gemma Triay and Lucia Sainz, who eliminated the world number 1s, Alejandra Salazar and Ariana Sánchez, in the semifinals to reach the final and take a big step towards finishing the season as world number 1's. Their opponents were the fifth-ranked pair, Bea González and Paula Josemaria, who eliminated the second-ranked pair, Marta Marrero and Marta Ortega, to reach their first final together. In the championship match, Gemma and Lucia defeated Bea and Paula in two sets, winning their fourth title of the season and their third consecutive. With the victory, in addition to winning their first title in Las Rozas, Gemma and Lucia also surpassed Ariana and Salazar in titles won in 2020, having four titles (1 Master and 3 Open's) against three titles (3 Open's) of their rivals.

In the men's category, for the first time this season, a pair outside the top 4 would win a title. The first finalists were the number two ranked pair, Pablo Lima and Paquito Navarro, who eliminated Coki Nieto and Jose Rico to reach their third final of the year and their first since the second tournament of the season. Their opponents would be the number five ranked pair, Federico Chingotto and Juan Tello, who in their fifth match managed to beat the number one ranked pair, Alejandro Galán and Juan Lebrón, for the first time to reach the final. However, the title match would not be played due to an injury to Lima (who played in the morning), which made the semifinal match between Chingotto and Tello against Galán and Lebrón a title match, automatically crowning Chingotto and Tello with the first title of their careers.

== Head-to-head record between teams ranked in the top 4 during the season ==
=== Men's ===
Record	Galán–Lebrón	Lima–Paquito	Belasteguín–Tapia	Sanyo–Stupaczuk	Former Pairs	Díaz–Maxi
Galán–Lebrón	—	1–1	2–1	6–0		1–0
Lima–Paquito	1–1	—	0–1	0–3		1–0
Belasteguín–Tapia	1–2	1–0	—	0–3		0–1
Sanyo–Stupaczuk	0–6	3–0	3–0	—		1–0
Former Pairs
Díaz–Maxi	0–1	0–1	1–0	0–1		—

=== Women's ===
Record	Ariana–Salazar	Marrero–Ortega	Gemma–Lucia	Majo–Mapi	Former Pairs	Delfina–Nogueira	Josemaria–Marrero	Bea–Ortega
Ariana–Salazar	—	—	2–3	2–0		1–0	1–1	1–1
Marrero–Ortega	—	—	0–1	1–0		—	—	—
Gemma–Lucia	3–2	1–0	—	1–1		1–0	2–2	2–0
Majo–Mapi	0–2	0–1	1–1	—		1–0	2–2	1–2
Former Pairs
Delfina–Nogueira	0–1	—	0–1	0–1		—	—	0–1
Josemaria–Marrero	1–1	—	2–2	2–2		—	—	1–0
Bea–Ortega	1–1	—	0–2	2–1		1–0	0–1	—

== Draws ==
=== Men's Bracket ===
Round of 32
1	(Spain) Galán / (Spain) Lebrón
Bye
(Argentina) A. Silingo / (Spain) S. Nerone	7	2	1
(Spain) Á. Cepero / (Spain) J. Mieres	5	6	6
(Spain) J. Garrido / (Spain) J. Martinez	6	2
(Brazil) L. Bergamini / (Argentina) M. Lamperti	7	6
(Spain) Coello / (Spain) I. Ramírez	4	6	1
6	(Argentina) Di Nenno / (Argentina) Maxi	6	4	6
5	(Argentina) Chingotto / (Argentina) J. Tello	6	6
(Spain) J. Morillas / (Spain) M. Del Castillo	1	2
(Chile) J. Valdes / (Spain) J. Sanz	6	7
(Spain) R. Rivera / (Spain) T. Bueno	3	6
(Spain) A. Santana / (Spain) M. Semmler	1	6	4
(Spain) J.M. Díaz / (Brazil) L. Campagnolo	6	3	6
Bye
3	(Argentina) Belasteguín / (Argentina) Tapia
3	(Argentina) Sanyo / (Argentina) Stupaczuk
Bye
(Spain) F. Gil Morales / (Spain) S. Alba	6	3	4
(Spain) A. Ruiz / (Spain) P. Lijó	4	6	6
(Spain) C. Fuster / (Spain) G. Rubio	6	3
(Spain) J.G. Diestro / (Spain) P. Fernández	7	6
(Spain) M. Piñeiro / (Spain) N. Gadea	2	3
8	(Spain) Coki / (Spain) J. Rico	6	6
7	(Spain) J. Ruiz / (Spain) U. Botello	7	6
(Spain) J. Rico / (Argentina) R. Moyano	6	2
(Argentina) A. Gutiérrez / (Argentina) J.C. Belluati	6	6
(Spain) E. Moreno / (Argentina) F. Quiles	3	2
(Argentina) A. Allemandi / (Spain) Momo	6	6
(Argentina) C. Gutiérrez / (Argentina) M. Grabiel	3	4
Bye
2	(Brazil) P. Lima / (Spain) Paquito

Round of 16
1	(Spain) Galán / (Spain) Lebrón	6	6
(Spain) Á. Cepero / (Spain) J. Mieres	3	4
(Brazil) L. Bergamini / (Argentina) M. Lamperti	4	0
6	(Argentina) Di Nenno / (Argentina) Maxi	6	6
5	(Argentina) Chingotto / (Argentina) J. Tello	6	6
(Chile) J. Valdes / (Spain) J. Sanz	2	0
(Spain) J.M. Díaz / (Brazil) L. Campagnolo	6	0
3	(Argentina) Belasteguín / (Argentina) Tapia	7	6
3	(Argentina) Sanyo / (Argentina) Stupaczuk	3	7	4
(Spain) A. Ruiz / (Spain) P. Lijó	6	6	6
(Spain) J.G. Diestro / (Spain) P. Fernández	2	2
8	(Spain) Coki / (Spain) J. Rico	6	6
7	(Spain) J. Ruiz / (Spain) U. Botello	6	7
(Argentina) A. Gutiérrez / (Argentina) J.C. Belluati	3	6
(Argentina) A. Allemandi / (Spain) Momo	2	3
2	(Brazil) P. Lima / (Spain) Paquito	6	6

Quarter-Final
1	(Spain) Galán / (Spain) Lebrón	6	6
6	(Argentina) Di Nenno / (Argentina) Maxi	3	2
5	(Argentina) Chingotto / (Argentina) J. Tello	4	7	6
3	(Argentina) Belasteguín / (Argentina) Tapia	6	6	3
(Spain) A. Ruiz / (Spain) P. Lijó	4	2
8	(Spain) Coki / (Spain) J. Rico	6	6
7	(Spain) J. Ruiz / (Spain) U. Botello	6	6
2	(Brazil) P. Lima / (Spain) Paquito	7	7

Semi-Finals
1	(Spain) Galán / (Spain) Lebrón	3	5
5	(Argentina) Chingotto / (Argentina) J. Tello	6	7
8	(Spain) Coki / (Spain) J. Rico	3	1
2	(Brazil) P. Lima / (Spain) Paquito	6	6

Finals
5	(Argentina) Chingotto / (Argentina) J. Tello	*
2	(Brazil) P. Lima / (Spain) Paquito

=== Women's Bracket ===
Round of 32
1	(Spain) Ariana / (Spain) Salazar
Bye
(Spain) A. Tapia / (Spain) J. Castelló	7	6
(Spain) A. Soriano / (Spain) P. Martínez	6	1
(Argentina) C. Paz / (Spain) I. Dominguez	6	2
(Spain) B. Las Heras / (Spain) C. Mesa	7	6
(Portugal) S. Araújo / (Argentina) V. Riera	6	6	6
8	(Argentina) A. Osoro / (Spain) C. Navarro	4	7	7
7	(Portugal) A.C. Nogueira / (Argentina) D. Brea	7	6
(Spain) S. Hernández / (Spain) T. Icardo	5	3
(Spain) L. Rufo / (Spain) M. Talavan	7	6
(Spain) B. Caldera / (Spain) C. Goenaga	6	3
(Spain) L. Martínez / (Spain) V. Virseda	6	6
(France) L. Clergue / (France) L. Godallier	2	1
Bye
3	(Spain) Gemma / (Spain) L. Sainz
4	(Spain) Majo / (Spain) Mapi
Bye
(Spain) E. Carnicero / (Spain) T. Navarro	6	2	5
(Spain) A. Cantin / (Spain) N. Rodríguez	2	6	6
(Spain) A. Galán / (Spain) V. Iglesias	7	4	6
(Spain) M. Gabarrus / (Spain) N. Rovira	6	6	7
(Spain) A.F de Ossó / (Spain) M. Villalba	6	3
5	(Spain) Bea González / (Spain) P. Josemaria	7	6
6	(Spain) E. Amatriain / (Spain) P. Llaguno	6	6
(Spain) L. Alonso / (Brazil) R. Piltcher	2	0
(Italy) C. Pappacena / (Italy) G. Sussarello	6	7
(Argentina) C. Jensen / (Spain) M. Gómez	2	5
(Spain) A. Blanco / (Spain) M. Merino	2	6
(Argentina) N. Brito / (Spain) N. Traviesa	6	7
Bye
2	(Spain) M. Marrero / (Spain) M. Ortega

Round of 16
1	(Spain) Ariana / (Spain) Salazar	6	6
(Spain) A. Tapia / (Spain) J. Castelló	3	2
(Spain) B. Las Heras / (Spain) C. Mesa	1	6
8	(Argentina) A. Osoro / (Spain) C. Navarro	6	7
7	(Portugal) A.C. Nogueira / (Argentina) D. Brea	1	4
(Spain) L. Rufo / (Spain) M. Talavan	6	6
(Spain) L. Martínez / (Spain) V. Virseda	1	6
3	(Spain) Gemma / (Spain) L. Sainz	6	7
4	(Spain) Majo / (Spain) Mapi	6	6
(Spain) E. Carnicero / (Spain) T. Navarro	4	4
(Spain) M. Gabarrus / (Spain) N. Rovira	0	3
5	(Spain) Bea González / (Spain) P. Josemaria	6	6
6	(Spain) E. Amatriain / (Spain) P. Llaguno	6	6
(Italy) C. Pappacena / (Italy) G. Sussarello	0	2
(Argentina) N. Brito / (Spain) N. Traviesa	1	2
2	(Spain) M. Marrero / (Spain) M. Ortega	6	6

Quarter-Final
1	(Spain) Ariana / (Spain) Salazar	6	6
8	(Argentina) A. Osoro / (Spain) C. Navarro	3	2
(Spain) L. Rufo / (Spain) M. Talavan	4	1
3	(Spain) Gemma / (Spain) L. Sainz	6	6
4	(Spain) Majo / (Spain) Mapi	4	2
5	(Spain) Bea González / (Spain) P. Josemaria	6	6
6	(Spain) E. Amatriain / (Spain) P. Llaguno	1	3
2	(Spain) M. Marrero / (Spain) M. Ortega	6	6

Semi-Finals
1	(Spain) Ariana / (Spain) Salazar	1	4
3	(Spain) Gemma / (Spain) L. Sainz	6	6
5	(Spain) Bea González / (Spain) P. Josemaria	1	7	7
2	(Spain) M. Marrero / (Spain) M. Ortega	6	6	5

Finals
3	(Spain) Gemma / (Spain) L. Sainz	6	7
5	(Spain) Bea González / (Spain) P. Josemaria	0	6

== Results ==
=== Round of 32 ===
Men's
Date	Winners	Score	Opponent	Ref.
18/11/2020	(Spain) Álvaro Cepero (Spain) Juani Mieres	5–7 / 6–2 / 6–1	(Argentina) Agustin Gomez Silingo (Argentina) Sebastián Nerone	
18/11/2020	(Brazil) Lucas Bergamini (Argentina) Miguel Lamperti	7–6 / 6–2	(Spain) Javi Garrido (Spain) Javier Martinez Vazquez	
18/11/2020	(Argentina) Martín Di Nenno (Argentina) Maxi Sánchez	6–4 / 4–6 / 6–1	(Spain) Arturo Coello (Spain) Iván Ramírez	
18/11/2020	(Argentina) Federico Chingotto (Argentina) Juan Tello	6–1 / 6–2	(Spain) Javier Perez Morillas (Spain) Mario Del Castillo	
18/11/2020	(Chile) Javier Valdes (Spain) Jon Sanz	6–3 / 7–6	(Spain) Rubén Rivera (Spain) Toni Bueno	
18/11/2020	(Spain) Juan Martín Díaz (Brazil) Lucas Campagnolo	6–1 / 3–6 / 6–4	(Spain) Aday Santana (Spain) Miguel Semmler	
18/11/2020	(Spain) Alejandro Ruiz (Spain) Pablo Lijó	4–6 / 6–3 / 6–4	(Spain) Francisco Gil Morales (Spain) Sergio Alba	
18/11/2020	(Spain) José García Diestro (Spain) Pincho Fernández	7–6 / 6–3	(Spain) Christian Fuster (Spain) Gonzalo Rubio	
18/11/2020	(Spain) Coki Nieto (Spain) Javi Rico	6–2 / 6–3	(Spain) Martin Sánchez Piñeiro (Spain) Nacho Gadea	
18/11/2020	(Spain) Javi Ruiz (Spain) Uri Botello	7–6 / 6–2	(Spain) José Rico (Argentina) Ramiro Moyano	
18/11/2020	(Argentina) Agustin Gutiérrez (Argentina) Juan Cruz Belluati	6–3 / 6–2	(Spain) Ernesto Moreno (Argentina) Federico Quiles	
18/11/2020	(Argentina) Adrián Allemandi (Spain) Momo González	6–3 / 6–4	(Argentina) Cristian Gutiérrez (Argentina) Maxi Grabiel	

Women's
Date	Winners	Score	Opponent	Ref.
18/11/2020	(Spain) Anna Cortiles Tapia (Spain) Jessica Castelló	7–6 / 6–1	(Spain) Arantxa Soriano (Spain) Patricia Martínez	
18/11/2020	(Spain) Barbara Las Heras (Spain) Carla Mesa	7–6 / 6–2	(Argentina) Celeste Paz (Spain) Isabel Dominguez	
18/11/2020	(Argentina) Aranzazu Osoro (Spain) Carolina Navarro	4–6 / 7–6 / 7–6	(Portugal) Sofia Araújo (Argentina) Virginia Riera	
18/11/2020	(Portugal) Ana Catarina Nogueira (Argentina) Delfina Brea	7–5 / 6–3	(Spain) Sandra Hernández (Spain) Tamara Icardo	
18/11/2020	(Spain) Lorena Rufo (Spain) Marta Talavan	7–6 / 6–3	(Spain) Beatriz Caldera (Spain) Carmen Goenaga	
18/11/2020	(Spain) Lucía Martínez (Spain) Verónica Virseda	6–2 / 6–1	(France) Laura Clergue (France) Léa Godallier	
18/11/2020	(Spain) Esther Carnicero (Spain) Teresa Navarro	6–2 / 2–6 / 5–6 / W.O.	(Spain) Angela Caro Cantin (Spain) Nuria Rodríguez	
18/11/2020	(Spain) Maite Gabarrús-Alonso (Spain) Nuria Rovira	6–7 / 6–4 / 7–6	(Spain) Alba Galán (Spain) Victoria Iglesias	
18/11/2020	(Spain) Bea González (Spain) Paula Josemaria	7–6 / 6–3	(Spain) Ana Fernández de Ossó (Spain) Maria Villalba	
18/11/2020	(Spain) Elisabeth Amatriain (Spain) Patricia Llaguno	6–2 / 6–0	(Spain) Lorena Alonso (Brazil) Raquel Piltcher	
18/11/2020	(Italy) Chiara Pappacena (Italy) Giulia Sussarello	6–2 / 7–5	(Argentina) Claudia Jensen (Spain) Mónica Gómez Rivas	
18/11/2020	(Argentina) Nela Brito (Spain) Nicole Traviesa	6–2 / 7–6	(Spain) Alicia Blanco Rojo (Spain) Melania Merino	

=== Round of 16 ===
Men's
Date	Winners	Score	Opponent	Ref.
19/11/2020	(Spain) Alejandro Galán (Spain) Juan Lebrón	6–3 / 6–4	(Spain) Álvaro Cepero (Spain) Juani Mieres	
19/11/2020	(Argentina) Martín Di Nenno (Argentina) Maxi Sánchez	6–4 / 6–0	(Brazil) Lucas Bergamini (Argentina) Miguel Lamperti	
19/11/2020	(Argentina) Federico Chingotto (Argentina) Juan Tello	6–2 / 6–0	(Chile) Javier Valdes (Spain) Jon Sanz	
19/11/2020	(Argentina) Agustín Tapia (Argentina) Fernando Belasteguín	7–6 / 6–0	(Spain) Juan Martín Díaz (Brazil) Lucas Campagnolo	
19/11/2020	(Spain) Alejandro Ruiz (Spain) Pablo Lijó	6–3 / 6–7 / 6–4	(Argentina) Franco Stupaczuk (Argentina) Sanyo Gutiérrez	
19/11/2020	(Spain) Coki Nieto (Spain) Javi Rico	6–2 / 6–2	(Spain) José García Diestro (Spain) Pincho Fernández	
19/11/2020	(Spain) Javi Ruiz (Spain) Uri Botello	6–3 / 7–6	(Argentina) Agustin Gutiérrez (Argentina) Juan Cruz Belluati	
19/11/2020	(Brazil) Pablo Lima (Spain) Paquito Navarro	6–2 / 6–3	(Argentina) Adrián Allemandi (Spain) Momo González	

Women's
Date	Winners	Score	Opponent	Ref.
19/11/2020	(Spain) Alejandra Salazar (Spain) Ariana Sánchez	6–3 / 6–2	(Spain) Anna Cortiles Tapia (Spain) Jessica Castelló	
19/11/2020	(Argentina) Aranzazu Osoro (Spain) Carolina Navarro	6–1 / 7–6	(Spain) Barbara Las Heras (Spain) Carla Mesa	
19/11/2020	(Spain) Lorena Rufo (Spain) Marta Talavan	6–1 / 6–4	(Portugal) Ana Catarina Nogueira (Argentina) Delfina Brea	
19/11/2020	(Spain) Gemma Triay (Spain) Lucia Sainz	6–1 / 7–6	(Spain) Lucía Martínez (Spain) Verónica Virseda	
19/11/2020	(Spain) Majo Sánchez (Spain) Mapi Sánchez	6–4 / 6–4	(Spain) Esther Carnicero (Spain) Teresa Navarro	
19/11/2020	(Spain) Bea González (Spain) Paula Josemaria	6–0 / 6–3	(Spain) Maite Gabarrús-Alonso (Spain) Nuria Rovira	
19/11/2020	(Spain) Elisabeth Amatriain (Spain) Patricia Llaguno	6–0 / 6–2	(Italy) Chiara Pappacena (Italy) Giulia Sussarello	
19/11/2020	(Spain) Marta Marrero (Spain) Marta Ortega	6–1 / 6–2	(Argentina) Nela Brito (Spain) Nicole Traviesa	

=== Quarter-Finals ===
Men's
Date	Winners	Score	Opponent	Ref.
20/11/2020	(Spain) Alejandro Galán (Spain) Juan Lebrón	6–3 / 6–2	(Argentina) Martín Di Nenno (Argentina) Maxi Sánchez	
20/11/2020	(Argentina) Federico Chingotto (Argentina) Juan Tello	4–6 / 7–6 / 6–3	(Argentina) Agustín Tapia (Argentina) Fernando Belasteguín	
20/11/2020	(Spain) Coki Nieto (Spain) Javi Rico	6–4 / 6–2	(Spain) Alejandro Ruiz (Spain) Pablo Lijó	
20/11/2020	(Brazil) Pablo Lima (Spain) Paquito Navarro	7–6 / 7–6	(Spain) Javi Ruiz (Spain) Uri Botello	

Women's
Date	Winners	Score	Opponent	Ref.
20/11/2020	(Spain) Alejandra Salazar (Spain) Ariana Sánchez	6–3 / 6–2	(Argentina) Aranzazu Osoro (Spain) Carolina Navarro	
20/11/2020	(Spain) Gemma Triay (Spain) Lucia Sainz	6–4 / 6–1	(Spain) Lorena Rufo (Spain) Marta Talavan	
20/11/2020	(Spain) Bea González (Spain) Paula Josemaria	6–4 / 6–2	(Spain) Majo Sánchez (Spain) Mapi Sánchez	
20/11/2020	(Spain) Marta Marrero (Spain) Marta Ortega	6–1 / 6–3	(Spain) Elisabeth Amatriain (Spain) Patricia Llaguno	

=== Semi-Finals ===
Men's
Date	Winners	Score	Opponent	Ref.
21/11/2020	(Argentina) Federico Chingotto (Argentina) Juan Tello	6–3 / 7–5	(Spain) Alejandro Galán (Spain) Juan Lebrón	
21/11/2020	(Brazil) Pablo Lima (Spain) Paquito Navarro	6–3 / 6–1	(Spain) Coki Nieto (Spain) Javi Rico	

Women's
Date	Winners	Score	Opponent	Ref.
21/11/2020	(Spain) Gemma Triay (Spain) Lucia Sainz	6–1 / 6–4	(Spain) Alejandra Salazar (Spain) Ariana Sánchez	
21/11/2020	(Spain) Bea González (Spain) Paula Josemaria	1–6 / 7–6 / 7–5	(Spain) Marta Marrero (Spain) Marta Ortega	

=== Finals ===
Men's
Date	Winners	Score	Opponent	Ref.
22/11/2020	(Argentina) Federico Chingotto (Argentina) Juan Tello	W.O.	(Brazil) Pablo Lima (Spain) Paquito Navarro	

Women's
Date	Winners	Score	Opponent	Ref.
22/11/2020	(Spain) Gemma Triay (Spain) Lucia Sainz	6–0 / 7–6	(Spain) Bea González (Spain) Paula Josemaria	
