= Ana Catarina Nogueira =

Portuguese tennis player

- Country (sports): Portugal
- Born: 20 September 1978 (age 46); Porto, Portugal
- Prize money: $45,627

Singles
- Career record: 120–123
- Career titles: 3 ITF
- Highest ranking: No. 383 (2 October 2000)

Doubles
- Career record: 51–66
- Career titles: 3 ITF
- Highest ranking: No. 386 (5 April 1999)

Team competitions
- Fed Cup: 22–24

Ana Catarina Nogueira (born 20 September 1978) is a Portuguese professional padel player and former international tennis player.

== Biography ==
Born in Porto, Nogueira holds the Portugal Fed Cup record for most ties played and is the most successful doubles player in the team's history. She featured in 36 ties between 1997 and 2008, winning 22 matches, 16 of which came in doubles.

Nogueira won three ITF singles titles and had a best ranking of 383 in the world. Most of her WTA Tour main-draw appearances came in her home country's events, including the Estoril Open where she played in the singles main draw as a wild card on four occasions.

She now competes on the World Padel Tour and in 2018 became the first Portuguese player to win a tournament.

== ITF finals ==
=== Singles (3–3) ===
$25,000 tournaments
$10,000 tournaments

Result	No.	Date	Tournament	Surface	Opponent	Score
Loss	1.	30 July 2000	Vancouver, Canada	Hard	(United States) Annica Cooper	2–6, 1–6
Loss	2.	5 August 2001	Pontevedra, Spain	Hard	(Spain) Arantxa Parra Santonja	3–6, 1–6
Win	1.	20 June 2004	Montemor-o-Novo, Portugal	Hard	(South Africa) Lizaan du Plessis	6–2, 6–3
Win	2.	15 August 2004	Albufeira, Portugal	Hard	(Russia) Irina Kotkina	7–5, 6–0
Loss	3.	25 July 2006	A Coruña, Spain	Hard	(Spain) Sara del Barrio Aragón	3–6, 6–7^{(4)}
Win	3.	14 October 2007	Espinho, Portugal	Clay	(France) Claire de Gubernatis	7–5, 3–6, 6–1

=== Doubles (3–3) ===
Result	No.	Date	Tournament	Surface	Partner	Opponents	Score
Win	1.	30 November 1998	Mallorca, Spain	Clay	(Japan) Yoriko Yamagishi	(Slovakia) Silvia Sosnarová (Germany) Marie Vrba	6–4, 3–6, 6–1
Loss	1.	17 May 1999	Elvas, Portugal	Hard	(Japan) Ayami Takase	(Finland) Hanna-Katri Aalto (Finland) Kirsi Lampinen	4–6, 4–6
Loss	2.	27 February 2000	Vilamoura, Portugal	Hard	(United Kingdom) Nicola Payne	(Italy) Maria Elena Camerin (Austria) Barbara Hellwig	2–6, 0–6
Loss	3.	7 May 2001	Mersin, Turkey	Clay	(Portugal) Angela Cardoso	(Turkey) Duygu Akşit Oal (Belarus) Elena Yaryshka	1–6, 4–6
Win	2.	25 June 2001	Elvas, Portugal	Hard	(Brazil) Maria Fernanda Alves	(Ukraine) Oleksandra Kravets (Spain) Arantxa Parra Santonja	6–3, 6–4
Win	3.	21 August 2005	Coimbra, Portugal	Hard	(Spain) María José Martínez Sánchez	(Germany) Angelique Kerber (Germany) Tatjana Priachin	6–4, 7–6^{(1)}
