= 2021 WPT Portugal Master =

World Padel Tour tournament held in Cascais, Portugal

- Date: 30 August – 5 September
- Edition: 6th
- Category: Master
- Location: Cascais, Portugal
- Venue: Jardins do Casino Estoril

Champions
- Men's doubles: (Spain) Alejandro Galán (Spain) Juan Lebrón
- Women's doubles: (Spain) Ariana Sánchez (Spain) Paula Josemaría

Chronology

The 2021 Portugal Master (officially 2021 World Padel Tour Cascais Pádel Máster) was the tenth tournament of the ninth season organized by World Padel Tour, the most prestigious padel circuit at the time, and the fifth tournament organized by a main padel circuit on Portuguese soil.

In the women's category, the second and fifth seeds reached the final, setting up a rematch of the Las Rozas final. The first finalists were the defending champions, Marta Marrero and Marta Ortega, who after eliminating the world number ones Alejandra Salazar and Gemma Triay in the quarter-finals, went on to defeat Delfina Brea and Tamara Icardo in the semi-finals. Their opponents were the second-seeded pair, Ariana Sánchez and Paula Josemaria, who reached the final after eliminating the third-ranked team, Bea González and Lucia Sainz. In the decisive match, Ariana and Paula defeated Marrero and Ortega in straight sets to claim their fourth title of the season, which combined with the early elimination of Gemma and Salazar, propelled them to the number one spot in the world rankings. With this victory, Ariana and Paula also secured their first title in Portugal.

In the men's category, the first and fourth-ranked pairs faced each other in a final for the first time this year. The first finalists were the world number ones, Alejandro Galán and Juan Lebrón, who advanced to the final after defeating Lucho Capra and Maxi Sánchez. Their opponents were the fourth-ranked pair, Federico Chingotto and Juan Tello, who had defeated Martín Di Nenno and Paquito Navarro in the semi-finals. In the decisive match, Galán and Lebrón beat Chingotto and Tello in three sets, securing their fourth title of the year. With this victory, Galán successfully defended the title he had won in the previous edition (in 2019), while Lebrón claimed his first title on Portuguese soil.

== Head-to-head record between teams ranked in the top 4 during the season ==
=== Men's ===
Record	Galán–Lebrón	Belasteguín–Sanyo	Lima–Tapia	Chingotto–Tello	Former Pairs	Di Nenno–Paquito
Galán–Lebrón	—	0–1	1–1	2–1		3–1
Belasteguín–Sanyo	1–0	—	1–1	1–0		1–1
Lima–Tapia	1–1	1–1	—	1–0		1–1
Chingotto–Tello	1–2	0–1	0–1	—		3–1
Former Pairs
Di Nenno–Paquito	1–3	1–1	1–1	1–3		—

=== Women's ===
Record	Gemma–Salazar	Ariana–Josemaria	Bea–Lucia	Llaguno–Riera	Former Pairs	Marrero–Ortega
Gemma–Salazar	—	2–1	1–1	2–1		0–2
Ariana–Josemaria	1–2	—	4–0	2–1		3–0
Bea–Lucia	1–1	0–4	—	2–3		—
Llaguno–Riera	1–2	1–2	3–2	—		—
Former Pairs
Marrero–Ortega	2–0	0–3	—	—		—

== Draws ==
=== Men's Bracket ===
Round of 32
1	(Spain) Galán / (Spain) Lebrón	6	6
(Brazil) L. Bergamini / (Brazil) L. Campagnolo	3	4
(Argentina) R. Moyano / (Spain) U. Botello	2	2
(Argentina) M. Lamperti / (Spain) M. Yanguas	6	6
(Spain) J.M. Díaz / (Spain) P. Lijó	6	7
(Spain) J. Serrano / (Spain) M. Díaz	1	5
WC	(Portugal) A. Fazendeiro / (Portugal) P. Araújo	4	4
7	(Spain) J. Rico / (Spain) Momo	6	6
6	(Argentina) L. Capra / (Argentina) Maxi	6	6
WC	(Portugal) D. Rocha / (Portugal) P. Graça	1	1
(Spain) E. Alonso / (Spain) J. Moya	6	6	6
(Spain) C. Fuster / (Spain) J. Barahona	2	7	3
Q	(Spain) A. Blanco / (Spain) J. Martinez	4	6	6
(Spain) A. Ruiz / (Spain) E. Moreno	6	4	1
Q	(Spain) Á. Cepero / (Spain) A. Arroyo	3	4
3	(Brazil) Lima / (Argentina) Tapia	6	6
4	(Argentina) Chingotto / (Argentina) J. Tello	6	6
(Spain) A. Sans / (Spain) I. Zaratiegui	2	1
(Spain) F. Gil Morales / (Spain) S. Alba	6	4	2
(Spain) J. Garrido / (Argentina) J.C. Belluati	2	6	6
(Spain) G. Rubio / (Spain) I. Ramírez	6	7
Q	(Argentina) D. Perino / (Spain) R. Méndez	3	6
(Argentina) A. Silingo / (Spain) J. Sanz	5	5
8	(Spain) Coello / (Spain) J. Ruiz	7	7
5	(Argentina) Di Nenno / (Spain) Paquito	6	6
(Spain) J. Leal / (Spain) M. Semmler	4	3
(Argentina) A. Gutiérrez / (Chile) J. Valdes	5	2
Q	(Spain) J.G. Mora / (Spain) R. Marcos	7	6
(Spain) J.G. Diestro / (Spain) P. Fernández	4	1
(Spain) J. Rico / (Spain) V. Ruiz	6	6
(Argentina) A. Allemandi / (Spain) Coki	7	6
2	(Argentina) Belasteguín / (Argentina) Sanyo	5	1

Round of 16
1	(Spain) Galán / (Spain) Lebrón	6	6
(Argentina) M. Lamperti / (Spain) M. Yanguas	3	1
(Spain) J.M. Díaz / (Spain) P. Lijó	6	2
7	(Spain) J. Rico / (Spain) Momo	7	6
6	(Argentina) L. Capra / (Argentina) Maxi	6	6
(Spain) E. Alonso / (Spain) J. Moya	2	3
Q	(Spain) A. Blanco / (Spain) J. Martinez	1	1
3	(Brazil) Lima / (Argentina) Tapia	6	6
4	(Argentina) Chingotto / (Argentina) J. Tello	6	6
(Spain) J. Garrido / (Argentina) J.C. Belluati	2	3
(Spain) G. Rubio / (Spain) I. Ramírez	6	4	3
8	(Spain) Coello / (Spain) J. Ruiz	2	6	6
5	(Argentina) Di Nenno / (Spain) Paquito	6	6
Q	(Spain) J.G. Mora / (Spain) R. Marcos	1	2
(Spain) J. Rico / (Spain) V. Ruiz	3	0
(Argentina) A. Allemandi / (Spain) Coki	6	6

Quarter-Final
1	(Spain) Galán / (Spain) Lebrón	6	6
7	(Spain) J. Rico / (Spain) Momo	3	4
6	(Argentina) L. Capra / (Argentina) Maxi	7	6
3	(Brazil) Lima / (Argentina) Tapia	5	3
4	(Argentina) Chingotto / (Argentina) J. Tello	6	6
8	(Spain) Coello / (Spain) J. Ruiz	4	4
5	(Argentina) Di Nenno / (Spain) Paquito	7	4	7
(Argentina) A. Allemandi / (Spain) Coki	6	6	5

Semi-Finals
1	(Spain) Galán / (Spain) Lebrón	6	6
6	(Argentina) L. Capra / (Argentina) Maxi	4	1
4	(Argentina) Chingotto / (Argentina) J. Tello	6	7
5	(Argentina) Di Nenno / (Spain) Paquito	3	5

Finals
1	(Spain) Galán / (Spain) Lebrón	4	7	6
4	(Argentina) Chingotto / (Argentina) J. Tello	6	5	3

=== Women's Bracket ===
Round of 32
1	(Spain) Gemma / (Spain) Salazar	6	6
Q	(Brazil) M. Schuck / (Spain) M. Caparros	3	4
(Spain) A. Cañellas / (France) L. Godallier	6	6
(Argentina) C. Jensen / (Spain) S. Bellver	7	7
(Spain) A. Cantin / (Spain) A. Soriano	6	6
Q	(Italy) C. Casali / (Spain) L. Pascual	3	2
(Spain) B. Las Heras / (Spain) C. Mesa	2	2
5	(Spain) M. Marrero / (Spain) M. Ortega	6	6
6	(Argentina) D. Brea / (Spain) T. Icardo	6	6
(Spain) B. Caldera / (Spain) C. Goenaga	1	2
(Argentina) J. Bidahorria / (Spain) N. Vivancos	5	5
(Spain) L. Rufo / (Spain) M. Talavan	7	7
Q	(Spain) M. Lobo / (Spain) S. Saiz	6	6
(Spain) A. Blanco / (Argentina) C. Paz	1	1
(Argentina) C. Reiter / (Spain) E. Carnicero	1	1
4	(Spain) P. Llaguno / (Argentina) V. Riera	6	6
3	(Spain) Bea González / (Spain) L. Sainz	6	4	6
(Spain) L. Martínez / (Spain) V. Virseda	2	6	1
(France) A. Collombon / (Spain) J. Castelló	6	6
(Portugal) C. Castro / (Portugal) K. Rodrigues	0	1
(Spain) C. Navarro / (Spain) E. Amatriain	7	6
(Spain) I. Domínguez / (Spain) L. Alonso	5	1
(Spain) A.F. Ossó / (Argentina) N. Brito	3	3
7	(Spain) Mapi / (Spain) Majo	6	6
8	(Argentina) A. Osoro / (Spain) V. Iglesias	6	6
(Portugal) M. Fernandes / (Portugal) P. Ribeiro	3	1
Q	(Spain) J. Velasco / (Spain) N. Canovas	6	0
(Argentina) C. Tenorio / (Spain) P. Martínez	1	1	*
(Spain) A. Martinez / (Brazil) R. Piltcher	3	0
(Spain) C. Mesa / (Spain) M. Villalba	6	6
(Portugal) A.C. Nogueira / (Portugal) S. Araújo	2	1
2	(Spain) Ariana / (Spain) P. Josemaria	6	6

Round of 16
1	(Spain) Gemma / (Spain) Salazar	6	6
(Argentina) C. Jensen / (Spain) S. Bellver	4	1
(Spain) A. Cantin / (Spain) A. Soriano	4	4
5	(Spain) M. Marrero / (Spain) M. Ortega	6	6
6	(Argentina) D. Brea / (Spain) T. Icardo	6	7
(Spain) L. Rufo / (Spain) M. Talavan	4	5
Q	(Spain) M. Lobo / (Spain) S. Saiz
4	(Spain) P. Llaguno / (Argentina) V. Riera	*
3	(Spain) Bea González / (Spain) L. Sainz	6	6
(France) A. Collombon / (Spain) J. Castelló	4	2
(Spain) C. Navarro / (Spain) E. Amatriain	3	7	6
7	(Spain) Mapi / (Spain) Majo	6	6	4
8	(Argentina) A. Osoro / (Spain) V. Iglesias	6	6
(Argentina) C. Tenorio / (Spain) P. Martínez	4	4
(Spain) C. Mesa / (Spain) M. Villalba	2	3
2	(Spain) Ariana / (Spain) P. Josemaria	6	6

Quarter-Final
1	(Spain) Gemma / (Spain) Salazar	6	4
5	(Spain) M. Marrero / (Spain) M. Ortega	7	6
6	(Argentina) D. Brea / (Spain) T. Icardo	6	6
4	(Spain) P. Llaguno / (Argentina) V. Riera	0	1
3	(Spain) Bea González / (Spain) L. Sainz	6	6
(Spain) C. Navarro / (Spain) E. Amatriain	4	3
8	(Argentina) A. Osoro / (Spain) V. Iglesias	7	3	1
2	(Spain) Ariana / (Spain) P. Josemaria	5	6	6

Semi-Finals
5	(Spain) M. Marrero / (Spain) M. Ortega	6	6
6	(Argentina) D. Brea / (Spain) T. Icardo	3	3
3	(Spain) Bea González / (Spain) L. Sainz	2	1
2	(Spain) Ariana / (Spain) P. Josemaria	6	6

Finals
5	(Spain) M. Marrero / (Spain) M. Ortega	3	4
2	(Spain) Ariana / (Spain) P. Josemaria	6	6

== Results ==
=== Round of 32 ===
Men's
Date	Winners	Score	Opponent	Ref.
1/9/2021	(Spain) Alejandro Galán (Spain) Juan Lebrón	6–3 / 6–3	(Brazil) Lucas Bergamini (Brazil) Lucas Campagnolo	
1/9/2021	(Argentina) Miguel Lamperti (Spain) Miguel Yanguas	6–2 / 6–2	(Argentina) Ramiro Moyano (Spain) Uri Botello	
1/9/2021	(Spain) Juan Martín Díaz (Spain) Pablo Lijó	6–1 / 7–5	(Spain) Jose Sánchez Serrano (Spain) Matías Díaz	
1/9/2021	(Spain) Javier Rico (Spain) Momo González	6–4 / 6–4	(Portugal) Alfonso Fazendeiro (Portugal) Pedro Araújo	
1/9/2021	(Argentina) Lucho Capra (Argentina) Maxi Sánchez	6–1 / 6–1	(Portugal) Diogo Rocha (Portugal) Pedro Graça	
1/9/2021	(Spain) Eduardo Alonso (Spain) Jesús Moya	6–2 / 6–7 / 6–3	(Spain) Christian Fuster (Spain) Javier Barahona	
1/9/2021	(Spain) Adrian Blanco (Spain) Javier Martinez Vazquez	4–6 / 6–4 / 6–1	(Spain) Alejandro Ruiz (Spain) Ernesto Moreno	
1/9/2021	(Argentina) Agustín Tapia (Brazil) Pablo Lima	6–3 / 6–4	(Spain) Alejandro Arroyo (Spain) Álvaro Cepero	
1/9/2021	(Argentina) Federico Chingotto (Argentina) Juan Tello	6–2 / 6–1	(Spain) Anton Sans (Spain) Iñigo Zaratiegui	
1/9/2021	(Spain) Javi Garrido (Argentina) Juan Cruz Belluati	2–6 / 6–4 / 6–2	(Spain) Francisco Gil Morales (Spain) Sergio Alba	
1/9/2021	(Spain) Gonzalo Rubio (Spain) Iván Ramírez	6–3 / 7–6	(Argentina) Denis Perino (Spain) Rafael Méndez	
1/9/2021	(Spain) Arturo Coello (Spain) Javier Ruiz	7–5 / 7–5	(Argentina) Agustin Gómez Silingo (Spain) Jon Sanz	
1/9/2021	(Argentina) Martin Di Nenno (Spain) Paquito Navarro	6–4 / 6–3	(Spain) Javi Leal (Spain) Miguel Semmler	
1/9/2021	(Spain) Javier García Mora (Spain) Raúl Marcos Durán	7–5 / 6–2	(Argentina) Agustin Gutiérrez (Chile) Javier Valdes	
1/9/2021	(Spain) José Rico (Spain) Victor Ruiz	6–4 / 6–1	(Spain) José García Diestro (Spain) Pincho Fernández	
1/9/2021	(Argentina) Adrián Allemandi (Spain) Coki Nieto	7–5 / 6–1	(Argentina) Fernando Belasteguín (Argentina) Sanyo Gutiérrez	

Women's
Date	Winners	Score	Opponent	Ref.
1/9/2021	(Spain) Alejandra Salazar (Spain) Gemma Triay	6–3 / 6–4	(Brazil) Manuela Schuck (Spain) Marta Caparros	
1/9/2021	(Argentina) Claudia Jensen (Spain) Sandra Bellver	7–6 / 7–6	(Spain) Ariadna Cañellas (France) Lea Godallier	
1/9/2021	(Spain) Angela Caro Cantin (Spain) Arantxa Soriano	6–3 / 6–2	(Italy) Carlotta Casali (Spain) Lourdes Pascual	
1/9/2021	(Spain) Marta Marrero (Spain) Marta Ortega	6–2 / 6–2	(Spain) Alba Galán (Spain) Barbara Las Heras	
1/9/2021	(Argentina) Delfina Brea (Spain) Tamara Icardo	6–1 / 6–2	(Spain) Beatriz Caldera (Spain) Carmen Goenaga	
1/9/2021	(Spain) Lorena Rufo (Spain) Marta Talavan	7–5 / 7–5	(Argentina) Julieta Bidahorria (Spain) Nuria Vivancos	
1/9/2021	(Spain) Marina Martinez Lobo (Spain) Sofía Saiz	6–1 / 6–1	(Spain) Alicia Blanco Rojo (Argentina) Celeste Paz	
1/9/2021	(Spain) Patricia Llaguno (Argentina) Virginia Riera	6–1 / 6–1	(Argentina) Cecilia Reiter (Spain) Esther Carnicero	
1/9/2021	(Spain) Bea González (Spain) Lucía Sainz	6–2 / 4–6 / 6–1	(Spain) Lucía Martínez (Spain) Verónica Virseda	
1/9/2021	(France) Alix Collombon (Spain) Jessica Castelló	6–0 / 6–1	(Portugal) Catarina Castro Vilela (Portugal) Katia Rodrigues	
1/9/2021	(Spain) Carolina Navarro (Argentina) Cecilia Reiter	7–5 / 6–1	(Spain) Isabel Domínguez (Spain) Lorena Alonso	
1/9/2021	(Spain) Mapi Sánchez (Spain) Majo Sánchez	6–3 / 6–3	(Spain) Ana Fernández de Ossó (Argentina) Nela Brito	
1/9/2021	(Argentina) Aranzazu Osoro (Spain) Victoria Iglesias	6–3 / 6–1	(Portugal) Margarida Fernandes (Portugal) Patricia Ribeiro	
1/9/2021	(Argentina) Catalina Tenorio (Spain) Patricia Martínez	1–6 / 1–0 / W.O.	(Spain) Jimena Velasco (Spain) Noa Canovas	
1/9/2021	(Spain) Carla Mesa (Spain) Maria Villalba	6–3 / 6–0	(Spain) Araceli Martinez (Brazil) Raquel Piltcher	
1/9/2021	(Spain) Ariana Sánchez (Spain) Paula Josemaria	6–2 / 6–1	(Portugal) Ana Catarina Nogueira (Portugal) Sofia Araújo	

=== Round of 16 ===
Men's
Date	Winners	Score	Opponent	Ref.
2/9/2021	(Spain) Alejandro Galán (Spain) Juan Lebrón	6–3 / 6–1	(Argentina) Miguel Lamperti (Spain) Miguel Yanguas	
2/9/2021	(Spain) Javier Rico (Spain) Momo González	7–6 / 6–2	(Spain) Juan Martín Díaz (Spain) Pablo Lijó	
2/9/2021	(Argentina) Lucho Capra (Argentina) Maxi Sánchez	6–2 / 6–3	(Spain) Eduardo Alonso (Spain) Jesús Moya	
2/9/2021	(Argentina) Agustín Tapia (Brazil) Pablo Lima	6–1 / 6–1	(Spain) Adrian Blanco (Spain) Javier Martinez Vazquez	
2/9/2021	(Argentina) Federico Chingotto (Argentina) Juan Tello	6–2 / 6–3	(Spain) Javi Garrido (Argentina) Juan Cruz Belluati	
2/9/2021	(Spain) Arturo Coello (Spain) Javier Ruiz	2–6 / 6–4 / 6–3	(Spain) Gonzalo Rubio (Spain) Iván Ramírez	
2/9/2021	(Argentina) Martin Di Nenno (Spain) Paquito Navarro	6–1 / 6–2	(Spain) Javier García Mora (Spain) Raúl Marcos Durán	
2/9/2021	(Argentina) Adrián Allemandi (Spain) Coki Nieto	6–3 / 6–0	(Spain) José Rico (Spain) Victor Ruiz	

Women's
Date	Winners	Score	Opponent	Ref.
2/9/2021	(Spain) Alejandra Salazar (Spain) Gemma Triay	6–4 / 6–1	(Argentina) Claudia Jensen (Spain) Sandra Bellver	
2/9/2021	(Spain) Marta Marrero (Spain) Marta Ortega	6–4 / 6–4	(Spain) Angela Caro Cantin (Spain) Arantxa Soriano	
2/9/2021	(Argentina) Delfina Brea (Spain) Tamara Icardo	6–4 / 7–5	(Spain) Lorena Rufo (Spain) Marta Talavan	
2/9/2021	(Spain) Patricia Llaguno (Argentina) Virginia Riera	W.O.	(Spain) Marina Martinez Lobo (Spain) Sofía Saiz	
2/9/2021	(Spain) Bea González (Spain) Lucía Sainz	6–4 / 6–2	(France) Alix Collombon (Spain) Jessica Castelló	
2/9/2021	(Spain) Carolina Navarro (Argentina) Cecilia Reiter	3–6 / 7–6 / 6–4	(Spain) Mapi Sánchez (Spain) Majo Sánchez	
2/9/2021	(Argentina) Aranzazu Osoro (Spain) Victoria Iglesias	6–4 / 6–4	(Argentina) Catalina Tenorio (Spain) Patricia Martínez	
2/9/2021	(Spain) Ariana Sánchez (Spain) Paula Josemaria	6–2 / 6–3	(Spain) Carla Mesa (Spain) Maria Villalba	

=== Quarter-Finals ===
Men's
Date	Winners	Score	Opponent	Ref.
3/9/2021	(Spain) Alejandro Galán (Spain) Juan Lebrón	6–3 / 6–4	(Spain) Javier Rico (Spain) Momo González	
3/9/2021	(Argentina) Lucho Capra (Argentina) Maxi Sánchez	7–5 / 6–3	(Argentina) Agustín Tapia (Brazil) Pablo Lima	
3/9/2021	(Argentina) Federico Chingotto (Argentina) Juan Tello	6–4 / 6–4	(Spain) Arturo Coello (Spain) Javier Ruiz	
3/9/2021	(Argentina) Martin Di Nenno (Spain) Paquito Navarro	7–6 / 4–6 / 7–5	(Argentina) Adrián Allemandi (Spain) Coki Nieto	

Women's
Date	Winners	Score	Opponent	Ref.
3/9/2021	(Spain) Marta Marrero (Spain) Marta Ortega	7–6 / 6–4	(Spain) Alejandra Salazar (Spain) Gemma Triay	
3/9/2021	(Argentina) Delfina Brea (Spain) Tamara Icardo	6–0 / 6–1	(Spain) Patricia Llaguno (Argentina) Virginia Riera	
3/9/2021	(Spain) Bea González (Spain) Lucía Sainz	6–4 / 6–3	(Spain) Carolina Navarro (Argentina) Cecilia Reiter	
3/9/2021	(Spain) Ariana Sánchez (Spain) Paula Josemaria	5–7 / 6–3 / 6–1	(Argentina) Aranzazu Osoro (Spain) Victoria Iglesias	

=== Semi-Finals ===
Men's
Date	Winners	Score	Opponent	Ref.
4/9/2021	(Spain) Alejandro Galán (Spain) Juan Lebrón	6–4 / 6–1	(Argentina) Lucho Capra (Argentina) Maxi Sánchez	
4/9/2021	(Argentina) Federico Chingotto (Argentina) Juan Tello	6–3 / 7–5	(Argentina) Martin Di Nenno (Spain) Paquito Navarro	

Women's
Date	Winners	Score	Opponent	Ref.
4/9/2021	(Spain) Marta Marrero (Spain) Marta Ortega	6–3 / 6–3	(Argentina) Delfina Brea (Spain) Tamara Icardo	
4/9/2021	(Spain) Ariana Sánchez (Spain) Paula Josemaria	6–2 / 6–1	(Spain) Bea González (Spain) Lucía Sainz	

=== Finals ===
Men's
Date	Winners	Score	Opponent	Ref.
5/9/2021	(Spain) Alejandro Galán (Spain) Juan Lebrón	4–6 / 7–5 / 6–3	(Argentina) Federico Chingotto (Argentina) Juan Tello	

Women's
Date	Winners	Score	Opponent	Ref.
5/9/2021	(Spain) Ariana Sánchez (Spain) Paula Josemaría	6–3 / 6–4	(Spain) Marta Marrero (Spain) Marta Ortega	
