= 2021 WPT Barcelona Master =

World Padel Tour tournament held in Barcelona, Spain

- Date: 13 – 19 September
- Edition: 14th (Note: The first seven editions were held under the organization of the Padel Pro Tour, with the first eight editions being Open's, while the 1st, 2nd and 12th editions were not held specifically in Barcelona but in the Catalunya region.)
- Category: Master
- Location: Barcelona, Spain
- Venue: Palau Sant Jordi

Champions
- Men's doubles: (Argentina) Martín Di Nenno (Spain) Paquito Navarro
- Women's doubles: (Spain) Alejandra Salazar (Spain) Gemma Triay

Chronology

The 2021 Barcelona Master (officially 2021 World Padel Tour Estrella Damm Barcelona Master) was the twelfth tournament of the ninth season organized by World Padel Tour, the most prestigious padel circuit at the time.

In the women's category, the first and third-ranked pairs both reached the final for the first time this season. The first finalists were the world number ones, Alejandra Salazar and Gemma Triay, who defeated Patricia Llaguno and Virginia Riera in the semi-finals. Their opponents were the third-ranked pair, Bea González and Lucía Sainz, who reached the final following the withdrawal of the twins Mapi and Majo Sánchez during their semi-final match. In the championship match, Gemma and Salazar defeated Bea and Lucía with ease, securing their fifth title of the season. With this victory, they claimed their first title in Barcelona as a pair, with Gemma successfully defended the title she had won the previous year (marking her third consecutive title), while Salazar secured her third win in Barcelona (having previously won in 2009 and 2014).

In the men's category, the fourth and fifth-ranked pairs reached the finals, meaning that a pair that hadn't won a title this season would be crowned champions. The first finalists were Federico Chingotto and Juan Tello, who eliminated the world number ones, Alejandro Galán and Juan Lebrón, in the semi-finals. Their opponents were Martín Di Nenno and Paquito Navarro, who after knocking out the second-ranked pair, Fernando Belasteguín and Sanyo Gutiérrez, in the quarter-finals, defeated Javier Garrido and Juan Cruz Belluati to reach the final. In the decisive match, Di Nenno and Paquito defeated Chingotto and Tello in three sets, securing their first title as a pair. With this victory, Di Nenno claimed the first title of his career, while Paquito secured his second title in Barcelona (having previously won there in 2015).

== Head-to-head record between teams ranked in the top 4 during the season ==
=== Men's ===
Record	Galán–Lebrón	Belasteguín–Sanyo	Lima–Tapia	Chingotto–Tello	Former Pairs	Di Nenno–Paquito
Galán–Lebrón	—	0–1	1–1	2–2		3–2
Belasteguín–Sanyo	1–0	—	1–1	1–0		1–2
Lima–Tapia	1–1	1–1	—	1–0		1–1
Chingotto–Tello	2–2	0–1	0–1	—		3–2
Former Pairs
Di Nenno–Paquito	2–3	2–1	1–1	2–3		—

=== Women's ===
Record	Gemma–Salazar	Ariana–Josemaria	Bea–Lucia	Marrero–Ortega	Former Pairs	Llaguno–Riera
Gemma–Salazar	—	3–1	2–1	1–2		3–1
Ariana–Josemaria	1–3	—	4–0	3–0		2–1
Bea–Lucia	1–2	0–4	—	—		2–3
Marrero–Ortega	2–1	0–3	—	—		0–1
Former Pairs
Llaguno–Riera	1–3	1–2	3–2	1–0		—

== Draws ==
=== Men's Bracket ===
Round of 32
1	(Spain) Galán / (Spain) Lebrón	6	6
Q	(Spain) Á. Cepero / (Argentina) F. Dominguez	1	0
(Spain) A. Sans / (Spain) I. Zaratiegui	6	5	0
(Spain) J.M. Díaz / (Spain) P. Lijó	4	7	6
Q	(Argentina) A. Gutiérrez / (Chile) J. Valdes	6	6	4
Q	(Spain) J. Gutiérrez / (Spain) S. Oria	3	7	6
(Brazil) L. Bergamini / (Brazil) L. Campagnolo	4	2
6	(Spain) A. Ruiz / (Argentina) Stupaczuk	6	6
8	(Spain) J. Rico / (Spain) Momo	6	7
(Spain) A. Blanco / (Spain) J. Martinez	3	5
LL	(Spain) J.G. Mora / (Spain) R. Marcos	3	6
(Spain) F. Gil Morales / (Spain) J. Moya	6	7
Q	(Uruguay) D. Ramos / (Spain) E. Moreno	3	2
(Spain) E. Alonso / (Spain) V. Ruiz	6	6
(Spain) A. Arroyo / (Spain) Coello	6	6	5
4	(Argentina) Chingotto / (Argentina) J. Tello	1	7	7
3	(Brazil) Lima / (Argentina) Tapia	6	6
(Spain) C. Fuster / (Spain) J. Barahona	3	2
(Spain) J. Rico / (Spain) M. Piñeiro	6	1
(Argentina) D. Perino / (Spain) S. Alba	7	6
(Spain) G. Rubio / (Spain) I. Ramírez	6	2
(Spain) J. Garrido / (Argentina) J.C. Belluati	7	6
(Spain) J.G. Diestro / (Spain) P. Fernández	7	6	6
7	(Argentina) L. Capra / (Argentina) Maxi	6	7	3
5	(Argentina) Di Nenno / (Spain) Paquito	6	6
(Spain) J. Leal / (Spain) M. Semmler	3	2
(Argentina) A. Silingo / (Spain) J. Sanz	6	6
(Spain) J. Mieres / (Spain) R. Méndez	4	3
(Spain) J. Serrano / (Spain) M. Díaz	4	1
(Argentina) M. Lamperti / (Spain) M. Yanguas	6	6
(Argentina) A. Allemandi / (Spain) Coki	4	3
2	(Argentina) Belasteguín / (Argentina) Sanyo	6	6

Round of 16
1	(Spain) Galán / (Spain) Lebrón	*
(Spain) J.M. Díaz / (Spain) P. Lijó
(Spain) J. Gutiérrez / (Spain) S. Oria	6	1	3
6	(Spain) A. Ruiz / (Argentina) Stupaczuk	4	6	6
8	(Spain) J. Rico / (Spain) Momo	6	5
(Spain) F. Gil Morales / (Spain) J. Moya	7	7
(Spain) E. Alonso / (Spain) V. Ruiz	3	2
4	(Argentina) Chingotto / (Argentina) J. Tello	6	6
3	(Brazil) Lima / (Argentina) Tapia	6	6
(Argentina) D. Perino / (Spain) S. Alba	0	3
(Spain) J. Garrido / (Argentina) J.C. Belluati	1	6	6
(Spain) J.G. Diestro / (Spain) P. Fernández	6	4	2
5	(Argentina) Di Nenno / (Spain) Paquito	7	6
(Argentina) A. Silingo / (Spain) J. Sanz	5	0
(Argentina) M. Lamperti / (Spain) M. Yanguas	7	4	4
2	(Argentina) Belasteguín / (Argentina) Sanyo	6	6	6

Quarter-Final
1	(Spain) Galán / (Spain) Lebrón	6	6	6
6	(Spain) A. Ruiz / (Argentina) Stupaczuk	7	4	4
(Spain) F. Gil Morales / (Spain) J. Moya	1	4
4	(Argentina) Chingotto / (Argentina) J. Tello	6	6
3	(Brazil) Lima / (Argentina) Tapia	6	3	4
(Spain) J. Garrido / (Argentina) J.C. Belluati	4	6	6
5	(Argentina) Di Nenno / (Spain) Paquito	6	3	6
2	(Argentina) Belasteguín / (Argentina) Sanyo	3	6	2

Semi-Finals
1	(Spain) Galán / (Spain) Lebrón	6	4	2
4	(Argentina) Chingotto / (Argentina) J. Tello	4	6	6
(Spain) J. Garrido / (Argentina) J.C. Belluati	4	2
5	(Argentina) Di Nenno / (Spain) Paquito	6	6

Finals
4	(Argentina) Chingotto / (Argentina) J. Tello	2	6	4
5	(Argentina) Di Nenno / (Spain) Paquito	6	3	6

=== Women's Bracket ===
Round of 32
1	(Spain) Gemma / (Spain) Salazar	6	6
Q	(Venezuela) A. Seijas Cali / (Uruguay) A. De los Santos	1	2
(Spain) C. Navarro / (Spain) E. Amatriain	6	6
(Argentina) C. Reiter / (Spain) E. Carnicero	2	1
(Spain) J. Velasco / (Spain) N. Canovas	2	0
(Spain) A. Galán / (Spain) B. Las Heras	6	6
(Argentina) J. Bidahorria / (Spain) N. Vivancos	6	0
7	(Argentina) A. Osoro / (Spain) V. Iglesias	7	6
6	(Spain) P. Llaguno / (Argentina) V. Riera	6	6
Q	(Italy) C. Orsi / (Italy) G. Sussarello	0	0
(Portugal) A.C. Nogueira / (Portugal) S. Araújo	7	6
(Spain) A. Cortiles / (Spain) X. Clasca	5	3
(Spain) A. Martinez / (Argentina) C. Paz	6	1
(Spain) B. Caldera / (Spain) C. Goenaga	7	6
(Spain) A. Cañellas / (France) L. Godallier	2	2
4	(Spain) M. Marrero / (Spain) M. Ortega
3	(Spain) Bea González / (Spain) L. Sainz	6	6
(Argentina) C. Jensen / (Spain) S. Bellver	0	3
(France) A. Collombon / (Spain) J. Castelló	6	6
(Spain) A. Blanco / (Brazil) R. Piltcher	3	4
(Spain) A. Cantin / (Spain) A. Soriano	4	3
(Argentina) C. Tenorio / (Spain) P. Martínez	6	6
(Spain) A.F. de Ossó / (Argentina) N. Brito	0	0
5	(Argentina) D. Brea / (Spain) T. Icardo	6	6
8	(Spain) Mapi / (Spain) Majo	6	6	6
Q	(Spain) M. Guinart / (Spain) N. Rodríguez	2	7	3
Q	(Spain) M. Lobo / (Spain) S. Saiz	0	3
(Spain) L. Rufo / (Spain) M. Talavan	6	6
(Spain) I. Domínguez / (Spain) L. Alonso	3	1
(Spain) L. Martínez / (Spain) V. Virseda	6	6
(Spain) C. Mesa / (Spain) M. Villalba	6	1	4
2	(Spain) Ariana / (Spain) P. Josemaria	3	6	6

Round of 16
1	(Spain) Gemma / (Spain) Salazar	6	6
(Spain) C. Navarro / (Spain) E. Amatriain	0	3
(Spain) A. Galán / (Spain) B. Las Heras	4	2
7	(Argentina) A. Osoro / (Spain) V. Iglesias	6	6
6	(Spain) P. Llaguno / (Argentina) V. Riera	6	6
(Portugal) A.C. Nogueira / (Portugal) S. Araújo	4	1
(Spain) B. Caldera / (Spain) C. Goenaga	3	3
4	(Spain) M. Marrero / (Spain) M. Ortega	6	6
3	(Spain) Bea González / (Spain) L. Sainz	6	7
(France) A. Collombon / (Spain) J. Castelló	2	5
(Argentina) C. Tenorio / (Spain) P. Martínez	2	3
5	(Argentina) D. Brea / (Spain) T. Icardo	6	6
8	(Spain) Mapi / (Spain) Majo	6	6
(Spain) L. Rufo / (Spain) M. Talavan	2	3
(Spain) L. Martínez / (Spain) V. Virseda	3	1
2	(Spain) Ariana / (Spain) P. Josemaria	6	6

Quarter-Final
1	(Spain) Gemma / (Spain) Salazar	6	6
7	(Argentina) A. Osoro / (Spain) V. Iglesias	2	3
6	(Spain) P. Llaguno / (Argentina) V. Riera	6	3	6
4	(Spain) M. Marrero / (Spain) M. Ortega	3	6	3
3	(Spain) Bea González / (Spain) L. Sainz	3	6	7
5	(Argentina) D. Brea / (Spain) T. Icardo	6	3	5
8	(Spain) Mapi / (Spain) Majo	7	3	6
2	(Spain) Ariana / (Spain) P. Josemaria	5	6	3

Semi-Finals
1	(Spain) Gemma / (Spain) Salazar	6	6
6	(Spain) P. Llaguno / (Argentina) V. Riera	3	2
3	(Spain) Bea González / (Spain) L. Sainz	3	*
8	(Spain) Mapi / (Spain) Majo	4

Finals
1	(Spain) Gemma / (Spain) Salazar	6	6
3	(Spain) Bea González / (Spain) L. Sainz	1	2

== Results ==
=== Round of 32 ===
Men's
Date	Winners	Score	Opponent	Ref.
15/9/2021	(Spain) Alejandro Galán (Spain) Juan Lebrón	6–1 / 6–0	(Spain) Álvaro Cepero (Argentina) Facundo Dominguez	
15/9/2021	(Spain) Juan Martín Díaz (Spain) Pablo Lijó	4–6 / 7–5 / 6–0	(Spain) Anton Sans (Spain) Iñigo Zaratiegui	
15/9/2021	(Spain) Jorge Ruiz Gutiérrez (Spain) Salvador Oria	3–6 / 7–6 / 6–4	(Argentina) Agustin Gutiérrez (Chile) Javier Valdes	
15/9/2021	(Spain) Alejandro Ruiz (Argentina) Franco Stupaczuk	6–4 / 6–2	(Brazil) Lucas Bergamini (Brazil) Lucas Campagnolo	
15/9/2021	(Spain) Javier Rico (Spain) Momo González	6–3 / 7–5	(Spain) Adrian Blanco (Spain) Javier Martinez Vazquez	
15/9/2021	(Spain) Francisco Gil Morales (Spain) Jesus Moya	6–3 / 7–6	(Spain) Javier García Mora (Spain) Raúl Marcos	
15/9/2021	(Spain) Eduardo Alonso (Spain) Victor Ruiz	6–3 / 6–2	(Uruguay) Diego Ramos (Spain) Ernesto Moreno	
15/9/2021	(Argentina) Federico Chingotto (Argentina) Juan Tello	1–6 / 7–6 / 7–5	(Spain) Alejandro Arroyo (Spain) Arturo Coello	
15/9/2021	(Argentina) Agustín Tapia (Brazil) Pablo Lima	6–3 / 6–2	(Spain) Christian Fuster (Spain) Javier Barahona	
15/9/2021	(Argentina) Denis Perino (Spain) Sergio Alba	7–6 / 6–1	(Spain) José Rico (Spain) Martin Sánchez Piñeiro	
15/9/2021	(Spain) Javi Garrido (Argentina) Juan Cruz Belluati	7–6 / 6–2	(Spain) Gonzalo Rubio (Spain) Iván Ramírez	
15/9/2021	(Spain) José García Diestro (Spain) Pincho Fernández	7–6 / 6–7 / 6–3	(Argentina) Lucho Capra (Argentina) Maxi Sánchez	
15/9/2021	(Argentina) Martin Di Nenno (Spain) Paquito Navarro	6–3 / 6–2	(Spain) Javi Leal (Spain) Miguel Semmler	
15/9/2021	(Argentina) Agustin Gómez Silingo (Spain) Jon Sanz	6–4 / 6–3	(Spain) Juani Mieres (Spain) Rafael Méndez	
15/9/2021	(Argentina) Miguel Lamperti (Spain) Miguel Yanguas	6–4 / 6–1	(Spain) Jose Sánchez Serrano (Spain) Matías Díaz	
15/9/2021	(Argentina) Fernando Belasteguín (Argentina) Sanyo Gutiérrez	6–4 / 6–3	(Argentina) Adrián Allemandi (Spain) Coki Nieto	

Women's
Date	Winners	Score	Opponent	Ref.
15/9/2021	(Spain) Alejandra Salazar (Spain) Gemma Triay	6–1 / 6–2	(Venezuela) Ana Seijas Cali (Uruguay) Andreina de los Santos	
15/9/2021	(Spain) Carolina Navarro (Argentina) Cecilia Reiter	6–2 / 6–1	(Argentina) Cecilia Reiter (Spain) Esther Carnicero	
15/9/2021	(Spain) Alba Galán (Spain) Barbara Las Heras	6–2 / 6–0	(Spain) Jimena Velasco (Spain) Noa Canovas	
15/9/2021	(Argentina) Aranzazu Osoro (Spain) Victoria Iglesias	7–6 / 6–0	(Argentina) Julieta Bidahorria (Spain) Nuria Vivancos	
15/9/2021	(Spain) Patricia Llaguno (Argentina) Virginia Riera	6–0 / 6–0	(Italy) Carolina Orsi (Italy) Giulia Sussarello	
15/9/2021	(Portugal) Ana Catarina Nogueira (Portugal) Sofia Araújo	7–5 / 6–3	(Spain) Anna Cortiles (Spain) Xenia Clasca	
15/9/2021	(Spain) Beatriz Caldera (Spain) Carmen Goenaga	7–6 / 6–1	(Spain) Araceli Martinez (Argentina) Celeste Paz	
15/9/2021	(Spain) Marta Marrero (Spain) Marta Ortega	6–2 / 6–2	(Spain) Ariadna Cañellas (France) Lea Godallier	
15/9/2021	(Spain) Bea González (Spain) Lucía Sainz	6–0 / 6–3	(Argentina) Claudia Jensen (Spain) Sandra Bellver	
15/9/2021	(France) Alix Collombon (Spain) Jessica Castelló	6–3 / 6–4	(Spain) Alicia Blanco Rojo (Brazil) Raquel Piltcher	
15/9/2021	(Argentina) Catalina Tenorio (Spain) Patricia Martínez	6–4 / 6–3	(Spain) Angela Caro Cantin (Spain) Arantxa Soriano	
15/9/2021	(Argentina) Delfina Brea (Spain) Tamara Icardo	6–0 / 6–0	(Spain) Ana Fernández de Ossó (Argentina) Nela Brito	
15/9/2021	(Spain) Mapi Sánchez (Spain) Majo Sánchez	6–2 / 6–7 / 6–3	(Spain) Marina Guinart (Spain) Nuria Rodríguez	
15/9/2021	(Spain) Lorena Rufo (Spain) Marta Talavan	6–0 / 6–3	(Spain) Marina Lobo (Spain) Sofía Saiz	
15/9/2021	(Spain) Lucía Martínez (Spain) Verónica Virseda	6–3 / 6–1	(Spain) Isabel Domínguez (Spain) Lorena Alonso	
15/9/2021	(Spain) Ariana Sánchez (Spain) Paula Josemaria	3–6 / 6–1 / 6–4	(Spain) Carla Mesa (Spain) Maria Villalba	

=== Round of 16 ===
Men's
Date	Winners	Score	Opponent	Ref.
16/9/2021	(Spain) Alejandro Galán (Spain) Juan Lebrón	W.O.	(Spain) Juan Martín Díaz (Spain) Pablo Lijó	
16/9/2021	(Spain) Alejandro Ruiz (Argentina) Franco Stupaczuk	4–6 / 6–1 / 6–3	(Spain) Jorge Ruiz Gutiérrez (Spain) Salvador Oria	
16/9/2021	(Spain) Francisco Gil Morales (Spain) Jesus Moya	7–6 / 7–5	(Spain) Javier Rico (Spain) Momo González	
16/9/2021	(Argentina) Federico Chingotto (Argentina) Juan Tello	6–3 / 6–2	(Spain) Eduardo Alonso (Spain) Victor Ruiz	
16/9/2021	(Argentina) Agustín Tapia (Brazil) Pablo Lima	6–0 / 6–3	(Argentina) Denis Perino (Spain) Sergio Alba	
16/9/2021	(Spain) Javi Garrido (Argentina) Juan Cruz Belluati	1–6 / 6–4 / 6–2	(Spain) José García Diestro (Spain) Pincho Fernández	
16/9/2021	(Argentina) Martin Di Nenno (Spain) Paquito Navarro	7–5 / 6–0	(Argentina) Agustin Gómez Silingo (Spain) Jon Sanz	
16/9/2021	(Argentina) Fernando Belasteguín (Argentina) Sanyo Gutiérrez	6–7 / 6–4 / 6–4	(Argentina) Miguel Lamperti (Spain) Miguel Yanguas	

Women's
Date	Winners	Score	Opponent	Ref.
16/9/2021	(Spain) Alejandra Salazar (Spain) Gemma Triay	6–0 / 6–3	(Spain) Carolina Navarro (Argentina) Cecilia Reiter	
16/9/2021	(Argentina) Aranzazu Osoro (Spain) Victoria Iglesias	6–4 / 6–2	(Spain) Alba Galán (Spain) Barbara Las Heras	
16/9/2021	(Spain) Patricia Llaguno (Argentina) Virginia Riera	6–4 / 6–1	(Portugal) Ana Catarina Nogueira (Portugal) Sofia Araújo	
16/9/2021	(Spain) Marta Marrero (Spain) Marta Ortega	6–3 / 6–3	(Spain) Beatriz Caldera (Spain) Carmen Goenaga	
16/9/2021	(Spain) Bea González (Spain) Lucía Sainz	6–2 / 7–5	(France) Alix Collombon (Spain) Jessica Castelló	
16/9/2021	(Argentina) Delfina Brea (Spain) Tamara Icardo	6–2 / 6–3	(Argentina) Catalina Tenorio (Spain) Patricia Martínez	
16/9/2021	(Spain) Mapi Sánchez (Spain) Majo Sánchez	6–2 / 6–3	(Spain) Lorena Rufo (Spain) Marta Talavan	
16/9/2021	(Spain) Ariana Sánchez (Spain) Paula Josemaria	6–3 / 6–1	(Spain) Lucía Martínez (Spain) Verónica Virseda	

=== Quarter-Finals ===
Men's
Date	Winners	Score	Opponent	Ref.
17/9/2021	(Spain) Alejandro Galán (Spain) Juan Lebrón	6–7 / 6–4 / 6–4	(Spain) Alejandro Ruiz (Argentina) Franco Stupaczuk	
17/9/2021	(Argentina) Federico Chingotto (Argentina) Juan Tello	6–1 / 6–4	(Spain) Francisco Gil Morales (Spain) Jesus Moya	
17/9/2021	(Spain) Javi Garrido (Argentina) Juan Cruz Belluati	4–6 / 6–3 / 6–4	(Argentina) Agustín Tapia (Brazil) Pablo Lima	
17/9/2021	(Argentina) Martin Di Nenno (Spain) Paquito Navarro	6–3 / 3–6 / 6–2	(Argentina) Fernando Belasteguín (Argentina) Sanyo Gutiérrez	

Women's
Date	Winners	Score	Opponent	Ref.
17/9/2021	(Spain) Alejandra Salazar (Spain) Gemma Triay	6–2 / 6–3	(Argentina) Aranzazu Osoro (Spain) Victoria Iglesias	
17/9/2021	(Spain) Patricia Llaguno (Argentina) Virginia Riera	6–3 / 3–6 / 6–3	(Spain) Marta Marrero (Spain) Marta Ortega	
17/9/2021	(Spain) Bea González (Spain) Lucía Sainz	3–6 / 6–3 / 7–5	(Argentina) Delfina Brea (Spain) Tamara Icardo	
17/9/2021	(Spain) Mapi Sánchez (Spain) Majo Sánchez	7–5 / 3–6 / 6–3	(Spain) Ariana Sánchez (Spain) Paula Josemaria	

=== Semi-Finals ===
Men's
Date	Winners	Score	Opponent	Ref.
18/9/2021	(Argentina) Federico Chingotto (Argentina) Juan Tello	4–6 / 6–4 / 6–2	(Spain) Alejandro Galán (Spain) Juan Lebrón	
18/9/2021	(Argentina) Martin Di Nenno (Spain) Paquito Navarro	6–4 / 6–2	(Spain) Javi Garrido (Argentina) Juan Cruz Belluati	

Women's
Date	Winners	Score	Opponent	Ref.
18/9/2021	(Spain) Alejandra Salazar (Spain) Gemma Triay	6–3 / 6–2	(Spain) Patricia Llaguno (Argentina) Virginia Riera	
18/9/2021	(Spain) Bea González (Spain) Lucía Sainz	3–4 / W.O.	(Spain) Mapi Sánchez (Spain) Majo Sánchez	

=== Finals ===
Men's
Date	Winners	Score	Opponent	Ref.
19/9/2021	(Argentina) Martín Di Nenno (Spain) Paquito Navarro	6–2 / 3–6 / 6–4	(Argentina) Federico Chingotto (Argentina) Juan Tello	

Women's
Date	Winners	Score	Opponent	Ref.
19/9/2021	(Spain) Alejandra Salazar (Spain) Gemma Triay	6–1 / 6–2	(Spain) Bea González (Spain) Lucía Sainz	
