= 2021 World Padel Tour =

Ninth edition of the World Padel Tour

Details
- Duration: 5 April – 19 December
- Edition: 9th
- Tournaments: 25
- Categories: Challenger (6); Open (13); Master (5); Masters Finals (1)

Achievements (singles)
- Most titles: Male (Spain) Alejandro Galán (Spain) Juan Lebrón (7); Female (Spain) Alejandra Salazar (Spain) Gemma Triay (8)
- Most finals: Male (Argentina) Martín Di Nenno (Spain) Paquito Navarro (10); Female (Spain) Alejandra Salazar (Spain) Gemma Triay (Spain) Ariana Sánchez (Spain) Paula Josemaría (10)

The 2021 World Padel Tour was the ninth edition of the World Padel Tour, the most prestigious professional padel circuit in the world. In the male division, Alejandro Galán and Juan Lebrón retained the number 1 spot for a second year. In the female division Alejandra Salazar and Gemma Triay were crowned number one for a second time, their first together as pair.

This edition was held throughout 2021 in six countries and from an economic standpoint, the tournament organizers, the Damm Group, hoped that this would be the first edition of the circuit to generate profits for the company, after the pandemic had forced the cancellation of a large part of the 2020 World Padel Tour calendar and all but three tournaments, which had to be played behind closed doors.

== Players ==
On the sporting side, at the beginning of the year numerous partner changes were made official for the top-ranked players on the men's and women's circuits.

In the men's circuit, the main changes include the union of:

- Fernando Belasteguín and Sanyo Gutiérrez;
- Agustín Tapia and Pablo Lima;
- Martín Di Nenno and Paquito Navarro;
- Alejandro Ruiz and Franco Stupaczuk;
- Adrián Allemandi and Maxi Sánchez;
- Coki Nieto and Juan Martín Díaz;
- Javi Rico and Momo González.

However, pairs like Federico Chingotto and Juan Tello, Javier Ruiz and Uri Botello, Agustín Gómez Silingo and Matías Díaz, and the number one ranked Alejandro Galán and Juan Lebrón stayed together for the 2021 World Padel Tour edition.

On the women's circuit, 2020 ended with the separation of the number one ranked pair, Gemma Triay and Lucía Sainz. For the 2021 World Padel Tour, the main changes included:

- Alejandra Salazar and Gemma Triay;
- Bea González and Lucía Sainz;
- Ariana Sánchez and Paula Josemaría;
- Elisabeth Amatriaín and Sofia Araújo;
- Patricia Llaguno and María Virginia Riera;
- Aranzazu Osoro and Victoria Iglesias;
- Ana Catarina Nogueira and Cata Tenorio.

Marta Marrero and Marta Ortega and the twins Majo Sánchez Alayeto and Mapi Sánchez Alayeto remained together.

== Tournaments and results ==
Open Master Challenger Master Final

Tournament	Date	Men's			Women's		
Tournament	Date	Winners	Score	Runners-up	Winners	Score	Runners-up
(Spain) Madrid Open	4 – 11 April	(Argentina) Fernando Belasteguín (Argentina) Sanyo Gutiérrez	6–7 / 6–4 / 6–3	(Spain) Alejandro Ruíz (Argentina) Franco Stupaczuk	(Spain) Ariana Sánchez (Spain) Paula Josemaría	6–3 / 6–4	(Spain) Bea González (Spain) Lucía Sainz
(Spain) Alicante Open	18 – 25 April	(Spain) Alejandro Galán (Spain) Juan Lebrón	6–0 / 6–4	(Spain) Alejandro Ruíz (Argentina) Franco Stupaczuk	(Spain) Alejandra Salazar (Spain) Gemma Triay	6–0 / 6–1	(Spain) Ariana Sánchez (Spain) Paula Josemaría
(Spain) Vigo Open	2 – 9 May	(Argentina) Fernando Belasteguín (Argentina) Sanyo Gutiérrez	4–6 / 6–4 / 6–2	(Argentina) Martín Di Nenno (Spain) Paquito Navarro	(Spain) Patricia Llaguno (Argentina) Virginia Riera	2–6 / 6–3 / 7–5	(Spain) Alejandra Salazar (Spain) Gemma Triay
(Spain) Santander Open	24 – 30 May	(Spain) Alejandro Galán (Spain) Juan Lebrón	6–3 / 6–2	(Spain) Javier Rico (Spain) Momo González	(Argentina) Delfina Brea (Spain) Tamara Icardo	6–1 / 7–5	(Spain) Patricia Llaguno (Argentina) Virginia Riera
(Spain) Marbella Master	7 – 13 June	(Spain) Alejandro Galán (Spain) Juan Lebrón	7–6 / 6–2	(Argentina) Agustín Tapia (Brazil) Pablo Lima	(Spain) Ariana Sánchez (Spain) Paula Josemaría	6–2 / 6–3	(Spain) Patricia Llaguno (Argentina) Virginia Riera
(Spain) Valladolid Master	21 – 27 June	(Argentina) Lucho Capra (Argentina) Maxi Sánchez	6–3 / 6–4	(Argentina) Federico Chingotto (Argentina) Juan Tello	(Spain) Alejandra Salazar (Spain) Gemma Triay	6–3 / 6–3	(Spain) Ariana Sánchez (Spain) Paula Josemaría
(Spain) Valencia Open	6 – 11 July	(Argentina) Fernando Belasteguín (Argentina) Sanyo Gutiérrez	7–5 / 3–6 / 6–4	(Spain) Alejandro Galán (Spain) Juan Lebrón	(Argentina) Delfina Brea (Spain) Tamara Icardo	6–7 / 6–1 / 6–4	(Spain) Alejandra Salazar (Spain) Gemma Triay
(Spain) Marbella Challenger	12 – 18 July	(Spain) Javier Rico (Spain) Momo González	6–3 / 3–6 / 6–3	(Argentina) Adrián Allemandi (Spain) Coki Nieto	(Argentina) Aranzazu Osoro (Spain) Victoria Iglesias	5–7 / 7–5 / 6–4	(Spain) Carolina Navarro (Spain) Elisabeth Amatriaín
(Spain) Las Rozas Open	19 – 25 July	(Argentina) Agustín Tapia (Brazil) Pablo Lima	6–1 / 6–4	(Argentina) Fernando Belasteguín (Argentina) Sanyo Gutiérrez	(Spain) Ariana Sánchez (Spain) Paula Josemaría	6–2 / 6–1	(Spain) Marta Marrero (Spain) Marta Ortega
(Spain) Lerma Challenger	26 July – 1 August	(Argentina) Lucho Capra (Spain) Javi Garrido	6–3 / 6–3	(Spain) Javier Rico (Spain) Momo González	(Spain) Carla Mesa (Spain) Carmen Villalba	6–0 / 7–5	(France) Alix Collombon (Spain) Jessica Castelló
(Spain) Málaga Open	2 – 8 August	(Argentina) Agustín Tapia (Brazil) Pablo Lima	6–2 / 7–6	(Argentina) Martín Di Nenno (Spain) Paquito Navarro	(Spain) Alejandra Salazar (Spain) Gemma Triay	7–5 / 6–2	(Argentina) Delfina Brea (Spain) Tamara Icardo
(Spain) La Nucia Challenger	9 – 15 August	(Spain) Javi Rico (Spain) Momo González	6–4 / 2–0 / WO	(Brazil) Lucas Campagnolo (Brazil) Lucas Bergamini	(France) Alix Collombon (Spain) Jessica Castelló	6–1 / 6–3	(Argentina) Aranzazu Osoro (Spain) Bárbara Las Heras
(Spain) Calanda Challenger	23 – 29 August	(Argentina) Adrián Allemandi (Spain) Coki Nieto	6–3 / 6–3	(Spain) Arnau Ayats (Argentina) Denis Perino	(Spain) Carolina Navarro (Spain) Elisabeth Amatriaín	6–4 / 7–6	(France) Alix Collombon (Spain) Jessica Castelló
Portugal Master	30 August – 5 September	(Spain) Alejandro Galán (Spain) Juan Lebrón	4–6 / 7–5 / 6–3	(Argentina) Federico Chingotto (Argentina) Juan Tello	(Spain) Ariana Sánchez (Spain) Paula Josemaría	6–3 / 6–4	(Spain) Marta Marrero (Spain) Marta Ortega
(Italy) Sardinia Open	6 – 11 September	(Spain) Alejandro Ruíz (Argentina) Franco Stupaczuk	6–2 / 7–6	(Argentina) Martín Di Nenno (Spain) Paquito Navarro	(Spain) Alejandra Salazar (Spain) Gemma Triay	6–7 / 6–3 / 6–1	(Spain) Ariana Sánchez (Spain) Paula Josemaría
(Spain) Barcelona Master	13 – 19 September	(Argentina) Martín Di Nenno (Spain) Paquito Navarro	6–2 / 3–6 / 6–4	(Argentina) Federico Chingotto (Argentina) Juan Tello	(Spain) Alejandra Salazar (Spain) Gemma Triay	6–1 / 6–2	(Spain) Bea González (Spain) Lucía Sainz
(Spain) Lugo Open	20 – 26 September	(Spain) Alejandro Galán (Spain) Juan Lebrón	6–4 / 4–6 / 6–3	(Argentina) Martín Di Nenno (Spain) Paquito Navarro	(Spain) Alejandra Salazar (Spain) Gemma Triay	6–1 / 6–4	(Spain) Patricia Llaguno (Argentina) Virginia Riera
(Spain) Albacete Challenger	27 September – 3 October	(Spain) Javier Garrido (Spain) Mike Yanguas	6–2 / 7–5	(Argentina) Agustín Gutiérrez (Argentina) Lucho Capra	(Portugal) Ana Catarina Nogueira (Portugal) Sofia Araújo	3–6 / 7–6 / 6–3	(Spain) Beatriz Caldera (Spain) Carmen Goenaga
(Spain) Menorca Open	4 – 10 October	(Spain) Alejandro Galán (Spain) Juan Lebrón	6–3 / 6–4	(Argentina) Martín Di Nenno (Spain) Paquito Navarro	(Spain) Alejandra Salazar (Spain) Gemma Triay	4–6 / 6–4 / 6–3	(Spain) Marta Marrero (Spain) Lucía Sainz
(Spain) Alfafar Challenger	11 – 17 October	(Spain) Coki Nieto (Spain) Javier Barahona	6–4 / 6–2	(Spain) Gonzalo Rubio (Spain) Iván Ramirez	(France) Alix Collombon (Spain) Jessica Castelló	6–3 / 6–2	(Spain) Carolina Navarro (Spain) Elisabeth Amatriaín
(Spain) Córdoba Open	18 – 24 October	(Argentina) Martín Di Nenno (Spain) Paquito Navarro	6–3 / 6–3	(Spain) Alejandro Ruíz (Argentina) Franco Stupaczuk	(Spain) Alejandra Salazar (Spain) Gemma Triay	6–7 / 6–4 / 6–4	(Spain) Ariana Sánchez (Spain) Paula Josemaría
(Sweden) Swedish Open	8 – 14 November	(Argentina) Agustín Tapia (Argentina) Sanyo Gutiérrez	7–5 / 6–0	(Argentina) Martín Di Nenno (Spain) Paquito Navarro	(Spain) Ariana Sánchez (Spain) Paula Josemaría	6–2 / 6–3	(Argentina) Delfina Brea (Spain) Tamara Icardo
Argentina Master	22 – 28 November	(Argentina) Martín Di Nenno (Spain) Paquito Navarro	6–4 / 6–2	(Argentina) Agustín Tapia (Argentina) Sanyo Gutiérrez	Not contested		
Mexico Open	29 November – 6 December	(Spain) Alejandro Ruiz (Argentina) Franco Stupaczuk	6–3 / 3–6 / 6–2	(Argentina) Martín Di Nenno (Spain) Paquito Navarro	Not contested		
(Spain) Master Final	16 – 19 December	(Spain) Alejandro Galán (Spain) Juan Lebrón	6–4 / 6–4	(Argentina) Agustín Tapia (Argentina) Sanyo Gutiérrez	(Spain) Ariana Sánchez (Spain) Paula Josemaría	6–4 / 6–2	(Spain) Lucía Sainz (Spain) Marta Marrero

== End of season ranking ==
Male

2021 Men's Ranking			Tournaments Won			
N.º	Name	Points	Open	Master	Master Final	Total
1	(Spain) Alejandro Galán	13.055	4	2	1	7
1	(Spain) Juan Lebrón	13.055	4	2	1	7
3	(Argentina) Martín Di Nenno	11.910	1	2	0	3
3	(Spain) Paquito Navarro	11.910	1	2	0	3
5	(Argentina) Sanyo Gutiérrez	9.010	4	0	0	4
6	(Argentina) Agustín Tapia	8.770	3	0	0	3
7	(Spain) Alejandro Ruíz	7.555	2	0	0	2
8	(Argentina) Franco Stupaczuk	7.515	2	0	0	2
9	Fernando Belasteguín	6.675	3	0	0	3
10	(Argentina) Federico Chingotto	6.515	0	0	0	0
10	(Argentina) Juan Tello	6.515	0	0	0	0
12	(Brazil) Pablo Lima	6.360	2	0	0	2
13	(Argentina) Lucho Capra	4.991	0	1	0	1
14	(Argentina) Maxi Sánchez	4.800	0	1	0	1
15	(Spain) Arturo Coello	3.696	0	0	0	0
16	(Spain) Momo González	3.673	0	0	0	0

Female

2021 Women's Ranking			Tournaments Won			
N.º	Name	Points	Open	Master	Master Final	Total
1	(Spain) Alejandra Salazar	12.755	6	2	0	8
1	(Spain) Gemma Triay	12.755	6	2	0	8
3	(Spain) Ariana Sánchez	11.585	3	2	1	6
3	(Spain) Paula Josemaría	11.585	3	2	1	6
5	(Argentina) Delfina Brea	7.505	2	0	0	2
6	(Spain) Tamara Icardo	7.294	2	0	0	2
7	(Argentina) Virginia Riera	6.955	1	0	0	1
7	(Spain) Patricia Llaguno	6.955	1	0	0	1
9	(Spain) Lucía Sainz	6.625	0	0	0	0
10	(Spain) Marta Marrero	5.840	0	0	0	0
11	(Spain) Bea González	5.735	0	0	0	0
12	(Spain) Victoria Iglesias	5.120	0	0	0	0
13	(Argentina) Aranzazu Osoro	5.115	0	0	0	0
14	(Spain) Marta Ortega	4.950	0	0	0	0
15	(Spain) Majo Sánchez Alayeto	3.435	0	0	0	0
16	(Spain) Mapi Sánchez Alayeto	3.265	0	0	0	0
