= 2021 WPT Marbella Master =

World Padel Tour tournament held in Marbella, Spain

- Date: 7 – 13 June
- Edition: 11th (Note: The first seven editions were held under the organization of the Padel Pro Tour, while the eight edition was contested as a Open tournament.)
- Category: Master
- Location: Marbella, Spain
- Venue: Puente Romano

Champions
- Men's doubles: (Spain) Alejandro Galán (Spain) Juan Lebrón
- Women's doubles: (Spain) Ariana Sánchez (Spain) Paula Josemaría

Chronology

The 2021 Marbella Master (officially 2021 World Padel Tour Cervezas Victoria Marbella Master) was the fifth tournament of the ninth season organized by World Padel Tour, the most prestigious padel circuit at the time.

In the women's category, the third and sixth-ranked pairs reached the final. The first finalists were the third-ranked pair, Ariana Sánchez and Paula Josemaria, who eliminated the world number one's, Alejandra Salazar and Gemma Triay, in the semi-final. Their opponents were Patricia Llaguno and Virginia Riera, who eliminated Aranzazu Osoro and Victoria Iglesias to reach their third consecutive final. In the final, Ariana and Paula defeated Llaguno and Riera in two sets, winning their second title of the season, with Paula successfully defending the title she won the previous season (Ariana's first in Marbella).

In the men's category, the top two seeded pairs reached the final. The first finalists were the world number ones, Alejandro Galán and Juan Lebrón, who for the third consecutive tournament faced the number four ranked pair, Martín Di Nenno and Paquito Navarro, eliminating them to reach the final. Their opponents were the third ranked pair, Agustín Tapia and Pablo Lima, who advanced to the final after Javi Ruiz and Uri Botello withdrew during the semi-fina. In the final, Galán and Lebrón defeated Lima and Tapia in two sets, winning their third title of the season and their first in Marbella.

The second ranked pair wouldn't compete in this tournament, due to Fernando Belasteguín suffering a muscle injury in his left calf during the semi-final of the previous tournament in Santander, against Javi Rico and Momo González. The expectation was that he would be out for five weeks, also missing the next Master in Valladolid, however, he would recover in time for the following event. Meanwhile, his teammate, Sanyo Gutiérrez, would play with his nephew, Cristian Germán Gutiérrez, also known as 'Sanyito' (little Sanyo).

== Head-to-head record between teams ranked in the top 4 during the season ==
=== Men's ===
| Record | Galán–Lebrón | Belasteguín–Sanyo | Lima–Tapia | Di Nenno–Paquito |
| Galán–Lebrón | — | — | 1–0 | 2–1 |
| Belasteguín–Sanyo | — | — | 1–0 | 1–0 |
| Lima–Tapia | 0–1 | 0–1 | — | — |
| Di Nenno–Paquito | 1–2 | 0–1 | — | — |

=== Women's ===
| Record | Gemma–Salazar | Ariana–Josemaria | Marrero–Ortega | Bea–Lucia |
| Gemma–Salazar | — | 1–1 | — | 0–1 |
| Ariana–Josemaria | 1–1 | — | — | 2–0 |
| Marrero–Ortega | — | — | — | — |
| Bea–Lucia | 1–0 | 0–2 | — | — |

== Draws ==
=== Men's Bracket ===
Round of 32
1 | (Spain) Galán / (Spain) Lebrón | 6 | 4 | 6
(Argentina) L. Capra / (Argentina) Maxi | 2 | 6 | 1
(Spain) J. Garrido / (Argentina) J.C. Belluati | 6 | 6
Q | (Spain) A. Luque / (Spain) M. Del Castillo | 2 | 4
LL | (Spain) R. Rivera / (Spain) T. Bueno | 6 | 4 | 2
(Argentina) A. Gutiérrez / (Spain) J. Martinez | 0 | 6 | 6
Q | (Spain) J. Leal / (Spain) M. Semmler | 3 | 4
6 | (Argentina) C.G. Gutiérrez / (Argentina) Sanyo | 6 | 6
8 | (Argentina) A. Silingo / (Spain) M. Díaz | 4 | 6 | 6
(Spain) A. Blanco / (Spain) J. Barahona | 6 | 2 | 0
(Spain) N. Gadea / (Spain) V. Ruiz | 7 | 4 | 6
(Spain) Coello / (Argentina) M. Lamperti | 5 | 6 | 7
(Spain) J. Rico / (Argentina) R. Moyano | 5 | 6 | 6
(Spain) G. Rubio / (Spain) R. Méndez | 7 | 1 | 4
(Argentina) D. Perino / (Spain) E. Moreno | 4 | 0
3 | (Argentina) Di Nenno / (Spain) Paquito | 6 | 6
4 | (Argentina) Chingotto / (Argentina) J. Tello | 6 | 6
(Spain) F. Gil Morales / (Spain) S. Alba | 3 | 0
(Spain) J. Rico / (Spain) Momo | 6 | 6
(Spain) Coki / (Spain) J.M. Díaz | 2 | 4
(Spain) J.G. Diestro / (Spain) P. Fernández | 6 | 6
(Spain) I. Ramírez / (Spain) M. Yanguas | 3 | 3
(Argentina) A. Allemandi / (Spain) P. Lijó | 6 | 5 | 6
7 | (Spain) J. Ruiz / (Spain) U. Botello | 4 | 7 | 7
5 | (Spain) A. Ruiz / (Argentina) Stupaczuk | 6 | 6
Q | (Chile) J. Valdés / (Spain) J. Serrano | 1 | 4
(Spain) A. Sans / (Spain) I. Zaratiegui | 6 | 4 | 6
Q | (Spain) E. Alonso / (Spain) J. Moya | 3 | 6 | 3
(Spain) J. Mieres / (Spain) M. Piñeiro | 6 | 4 | 4
(Spain) A. Santana / (Spain) Á. Cepero | 4 | 6 | 6
(Spain) C. Fuster / (Spain) J. Sanz | 4 | 7 | 4
2 | (Brazil) Lima / (Argentina) Tapia | 6 | 6 | 6

Round of 16
1 | (Spain) Galán / (Spain) Lebrón | 6 | 6
(Spain) J. Garrido / (Argentina) J.C. Belluati | 2 | 4
(Argentina) A. Gutiérrez / (Spain) J. Martinez | 7 | 6
6 | (Argentina) C.G. Gutiérrez / (Argentina) Sanyo | 6 | 4
8 | (Argentina) A. Silingo / (Spain) M. Díaz | 6 | 6
(Spain) Coello / (Argentina) M. Lamperti | 3 | 4
(Spain) J. Rico / (Argentina) R. Moyano | 4 | 0
3 | (Argentina) Di Nenno / (Spain) Paquito | 6 | 5 | *
4 | (Argentina) Chingotto / (Argentina) J. Tello | 6 | 6
(Spain) J. Rico / (Spain) Momo | 4 | 2
(Spain) J.G. Diestro / (Spain) P. Fernández | 4 | 1
7 | (Spain) J. Ruiz / (Spain) U. Botello | 6 | 6
5 | (Spain) A. Ruiz / (Argentina) Stupaczuk | 6 | 6
(Spain) A. Sans / (Spain) I. Zaratiegui | 3 | 2
(Spain) A. Santana / (Spain) Á. Cepero | 1 | 1
2 | (Brazil) Lima / (Argentina) Tapia | 6 | 6

Quarter-Final
1 | (Spain) Galán / (Spain) Lebrón | 6 | 6
(Argentina) A. Gutiérrez / (Spain) J. Martinez | 2 | 2
8 | (Argentina) A. Silingo / (Spain) M. Díaz | 5 | 2
3 | (Argentina) Di Nenno / (Spain) Paquito | 7 | 6
4 | (Argentina) Chingotto / (Argentina) J. Tello | 4 | 6 | 0
7 | (Spain) J. Ruiz / (Spain) U. Botello | 6 | 3 | 6
5 | (Spain) A. Ruiz / (Argentina) Stupaczuk | 5 | 5
2 | (Brazil) Lima / (Argentina) Tapia | 7 | 7

Semi-Finals
1 | (Spain) Galán / (Spain) Lebrón | 7 | 6
3 | (Argentina) Di Nenno / (Spain) Paquito | 5 | 4
7 | (Spain) J. Ruiz / (Spain) U. Botello | 6 | 1
2 | (Brazil) Lima / (Argentina) Tapia | 7 | 4 | *

Finals
1 | (Spain) Galán / (Spain) Lebrón | 7 | 6
2 | (Brazil) Lima / (Argentina) Tapia | 6 | 2

=== Women's Bracket ===
Round of 32
1 | (Spain) Gemma / (Spain) Salazar | 6 | 6
(Argentina) C. Tenorio / (Argentina) J. Bidahorria | 3 | 2
(Spain) L. Rufo / (Spain) M. Talavan | 6 | 7
Q | (Spain) J. Bautista / (Spain) S. Pujals | 4 | 6
Q | (Italy) C. Orsi / (Spain) E. Guimet | 6 | 4
(Spain) A. Cortiles / (Uruguay) A. De los Santos | 7 | 6
(Spain) B. Caldera / (Spain) C. Goenaga | 6 | 2
8 | (Argentina) D. Brea / (Spain) T. Icardo | 7 | 6
5 | (Spain) Majo / (Spain) Mapi | 7 | 6
(Spain) E. Carnicero / (Brazil) R. Piltcher | 5 | 4
(Argentina) C. Paz / (Spain) M. Gabarrus | 0 | 3
(Spain) A. Galán / (Spain) M. Villalba | 6 | 6
(Spain) L. Martínez / (Spain) V. Virseda | 6 | 6
(Argentina) N. Brito / (Spain) N. Traviesa | 2 | 1
(Argentina) C. Jensen / (Spain) S. Bellver | 3 | 2
3 | (Spain) Ariana / (Spain) P. Josemaria | 6 | 6
4 | (Spain) M. Marrero / (Spain) M. Ortega | 6 | 4
(Argentina) A. Osoro / (Spain) V. Iglesias | 7 | 6
(Portugal) A.C. Nogueira / (Spain) T. Navarro | 6 | 6
(Spain) A. Martínez / (Spain) S. Hernández | 1 | 1
(Spain) A. Cañellas / (France) L. Godallier | 6 | 6
Q | (Spain) N. Vivancos / (Spain) X. Clasca | 4 | 3
(Spain) C. Navarro / (Argentina) C. Reiter | 6 | 6
7 | (Spain) E. Amatriain / (Portugal) S. Araújo | 4 | 4
6 | (Spain) P. Llaguno / (Argentina) V. Riera | 6 | 6
Q | (Italy) C. Pappacena / (Italy) G. Sussarello | 1 | 1
(Spain) A. Blanco / (Spain) N. Rodríguez | 7 | 2 | 3
(France) A. Collombon / (Spain) J. Castelló | 6 | 6 | 6
(Spain) B. Las Heras / (Spain) C. Mesa | 6 | 3 | 6
(Spain) I. Domínguez / (Spain) L. Alonso | 1 | 6 | 2
(Spain) A: Cantin / (Spain) A. Soriano | 1 | 1
2 | (Spain) Bea González / (Spain) L. Sainz | 6 | 6

Round of 16
1 | (Spain) Gemma / (Spain) Salazar | 6 | 6
(Spain) L. Rufo / (Spain) M. Talavan | 0 | 2
(Spain) A. Cortiles / (Uruguay) A. De los Santos | 4 | 1
8 | (Argentina) D. Brea / (Spain) T. Icardo | 6 | 6
5 | (Spain) Majo / (Spain) Mapi | 6 | 6
(Spain) A. Galán / (Spain) M. Villalba | 3 | 1
(Spain) L. Martínez / (Spain) V. Virseda | 1 | 2
3 | (Spain) Ariana / (Spain) P. Josemaria | 6 | 6
(Argentina) A. Osoro / (Spain) V. Iglesias | 6 | 6
(Portugal) A.C. Nogueira / (Spain) T. Navarro | 2 | 4
(Spain) A. Cañellas / (France) L. Godallier | 7 | 1 | 2
(Spain) C. Navarro / (Argentina) C. Reiter | 6 | 6 | 6
6 | (Spain) P. Llaguno / (Argentina) V. Riera | 6 | 6
(France) A. Collombon / (Spain) J. Castelló | 1 | 3
(Spain) B. Las Heras / (Spain) C. Mesa | 4 | 0
2 | (Spain) Bea González / (Spain) L. Sainz | 6 | 6

Quarter-Final
1 | (Spain) Gemma / (Spain) Salazar | *
8 | (Argentina) D. Brea / (Spain) T. Icardo
5 | (Spain) Majo / (Spain) Mapi | 7 | 1 | 3
3 | (Spain) Ariana / (Spain) P. Josemaria | 6 | 6 | 6
(Argentina) A. Osoro / (Spain) V. Iglesias | 6 | 6
(Spain) C. Navarro / (Argentina) C. Reiter | 2 | 3
6 | (Spain) P. Llaguno / (Argentina) V. Riera | 4 | 6 | 7
2 | (Spain) Bea González / (Spain) L. Sainz | 6 | 4 | 6

Semi-Finals
1 | (Spain) Gemma / (Spain) Salazar | 1 | 7 | 2
3 | (Spain) Ariana / (Spain) P. Josemaria | 6 | 5 | 6
(Argentina) A. Osoro / (Spain) V. Iglesias | 3 | 1
6 | (Spain) P. Llaguno / (Argentina) V. Riera | 6 | 6

Finals
3 | (Spain) Ariana / (Spain) P. Josemaria | 6 | 6
6 | (Spain) P. Llaguno / (Argentina) V. Riera | 2 | 3

== Results ==
=== Round of 32 ===
Men's
| Date | Winners | Score | Opponent | Ref. |
|---|---|---|---|---|
| 9/6/2021 | (Spain) Alejandro Galán (Spain) Juan Lebrón | 6–2 / 4–6 / 6–1 | (Argentina) Lucho Capra (Argentina) Maxi Sánchez | |
| 9/6/2021 | (Spain) Javi Garrido (Argentina) Juan Cruz Belluati | 6–2 / 6–4 | (Spain) Antonio Luque (Spain) Mario Del Castillo | |
| 9/6/2021 | (Argentina) Agustín Gutiérrez (Spain) Javier Martinez Vázquez | 0–6 / 6–4 / 6–2 | (Spain) Rubén Rivera (Spain) Toni Bueno | |
| 9/6/2021 | (Argentina) Cristian German Gutiérrez (Argentina) Sanyo Gutiérrez | 6–3 / 6–4 | (Spain) Javi Leal (Spain) Miguel Semmler | |
| 9/6/2021 | (Argentina) Agustin Gomez Silingo (Spain) Matías Díaz | 4–6 / 6–2 / 6–0 | (Spain) Adrian Blanco (Spain) Javier Barahona | |
| 9/6/2021 | (Spain) Arturo Coello (Argentina) Miguel Lamperti | 5–7 / 6–4 / 7–6 | (Spain) Nacho Gadea (Spain) Víctor Ruiz | |
| 9/6/2021 | (Spain) José Rico (Argentina) Ramiro Moyano | 5–7 / 6–1 / 6–4 | (Spain) Gonzalo Rubio (Spain) Rafael Méndez | |
| 9/6/2021 | (Argentina) Martin Di Nenno (Spain) Paquito Navarro | 6–4 / 6–0 | (Argentina) Denis Perino (Spain) Ernesto Moreno | |
| 9/6/2021 | (Argentina) Federico Chingotto (Argentina) Juan Tello | 6–3 / 6–0 | (Spain) Francisco Gil Morales (Spain) Sergio Alba | |
| 9/6/2021 | (Spain) Javier Rico (Spain) Momo González | 6–2 / 6–4 | (Spain) Coki Nieto (Spain) Juan Martín Díaz | |
| 9/6/2021 | (Spain) José García Diestro (Spain) Pincho Fernández | 6–3 / 6–3 | (Spain) Iván Ramírez (Spain) Mike Yanguas | |
| 9/6/2021 | (Spain) Javier Ruiz (Spain) Uri Botello | 4–6 / 7–5 / 7–6 | (Argentina) Adrián Allemandi (Spain) Pablo Lijó | |
| 9/6/2021 | (Spain) Alejandro Ruiz (Argentina) Franco Stupaczuk | 6–1 / 6–4 | (Chile) Javier Valdés (Spain) Jose Sánchez Serrano | |
| 9/6/2021 | (Spain) Anton Sans (Spain) Iñigo Zaratiegui | 6–3 / 4–6 / 6–3 | (Spain) Eduardo Alonso (Spain) Jesús Moya | |
| 9/6/2021 | (Spain) Juani Mieres (Spain) Martín Sánchez Piñeiro | 4–6 / 6–4 / 6–4 | (Spain) Aday Santana (Spain) Álvaro Cepero | |
| 9/6/2021 | (Argentina) Agustín Tapia (Brazil) Pablo Lima | 6–4 / 6–7 / 6–4 | (Spain) Christian Fuster (Spain) Jon Sanz | |

Women's
| Date | Winners | Score | Opponent | Ref. |
|---|---|---|---|---|
| 9/6/2021 | (Spain) Alejandra Salazar (Spain) Gemma Triay | 6–3 / 6–2 | (Argentina) Catalina Tenorio (Argentina) Julieta Bidahorria | |
| 9/6/2021 | (Spain) Lorena Rufo (Spain) Marta Talavan | 6–4 / 7–6 | (Spain) Julia Polo Bautista (Spain) Sara Pujals | |
| 9/6/2021 | (Uruguay) Andreina de los Santos (Spain) Anna Cortiles | 7–6 / 6–4 | (Italy) Carolina Orsi (Spain) Eugenia Guimet | |
| 9/6/2021 | (Argentina) Delfina Brea (Spain) Tamara Icardo | 7–6 / 6–2 | (Spain) Beatriz Caldera (Spain) Carmen Goenaga | |
| 9/6/2021 | (Spain) Majo Sánchez (Spain) Mapi Sánchez | 7–5 / 6–4 | (Spain) Esther Carnicero (Brazil) Raquel Piltcher | |
| 9/6/2021 | (Spain) Alba Galán (Spain) Maria Villalba | 6–0 / 6–3 | (Argentina) Celeste Paz (Spain) Maite Gabarrús | |
| 9/6/2021 | (Spain) Lucía Martínez (Spain) Verónica Virseda | 6–2 / 6–1 | (Argentina) Nela Brito (Spain) Nicole Traviesa | |
| 9/6/2021 | (Spain) Ariana Sánchez (Spain) Paula Josemaria | 6–3 / 6–2 | (Argentina) Claudia Jensen (Spain) Sandra Bellver | |
| 9/6/2021 | (Argentina) Aranzazu Osoro (Spain) Victoria Iglesias | 7–6 / 6–4 | (Spain) Marta Marrero (Spain) Marta Ortega | |
| 9/6/2021 | (Portugal) Ana Catarina Nogueira (Spain) Teresa Navarro | 6–1 / 6–1 | (Spain) Araceli Martínez (Spain) Sandra Hernández | |
| 9/6/2021 | (Spain) Nuria Vivancos (Spain) Xenia Clasca | 6–4 / 6–3 | (Spain) Ariadna Cañellas (France) Lea Godallier | |
| 9/6/2021 | (Spain) Carolina Navarro (Argentina) Cecilia Reiter | 6–4 / 6–4 | (Spain) Elisabeth Amatriain (Portugal) Sofia Araújo | |
| 9/6/2021 | (Spain) Patricia Llaguno (Argentina) Virginia Riera | 6–1 / 6–1 | (Italy) Chiara Pappacena (Italy) Giulia Sussarello | |
| 9/6/2021 | (France) Alix Collombon (Spain) Jessica Castelló | 6–7 / 6–2 / 6–3 | (Spain) Alicia Blanco Rojo (Spain) Nuria Rodríguez | |
| 9/6/2021 | (Spain) Barbara Las Heras (Spain) Carla Mesa | 6–1 / 3–6 / 6–2 | (Spain) Isabel Domínguez (Spain) Lorena Alonso | |
| 9/6/2021 | (Spain) Bea González (Spain) Lucía Sainz | 6–1 / 6–1 | (Spain) Angela Caro Cantin (Spain) Arantxa Soriano | |

=== Round of 16 ===
Men's
| Date | Winners | Score | Opponent | Ref. |
|---|---|---|---|---|
| 10/6/2021 | (Spain) Alejandro Galán (Spain) Juan Lebrón | 6–2 / 6–4 | (Spain) Javi Garrido (Argentina) Juan Cruz Belluati | |
| 10/6/2021 | (Argentina) Agustín Gutiérrez (Spain) Javier Martinez Vázquez | 7–6 / 6–4 | (Argentina) Cristian German Gutiérrez (Argentina) Sanyo Gutiérrez | |
| 10/6/2021 | (Argentina) Agustin Gomez Silingo (Spain) Matías Díaz | 6–3 / 6–4 | (Spain) Arturo Coello (Argentina) Miguel Lamperti | |
| 10/6/2021 | (Argentina) Martin Di Nenno (Spain) Paquito Navarro | 6–4 / 5–0 / W.O. | (Spain) José Rico (Argentina) Ramiro Moyano | |
| 10/6/2021 | (Argentina) Federico Chingotto (Argentina) Juan Tello | 6–4 / 6–2 | (Spain) Javier Rico (Spain) Momo González | |
| 10/6/2021 | (Spain) Javier Ruiz (Spain) Uri Botello | 6–4 / 6–1 | (Spain) José García Diestro (Spain) Pincho Fernández | |
| 10/6/2021 | (Spain) Alejandro Ruiz (Argentina) Franco Stupaczuk | 6–3 / 6–2 | (Spain) Anton Sans (Spain) Iñigo Zaratiegui | |
| 10/6/2021 | (Argentina) Agustín Tapia (Brazil) Pablo Lima | 6–1 / 6–1 | (Spain) Juani Mieres (Spain) Martín Sánchez Piñeiro | |

Women's
| Date | Winners | Score | Opponent | Ref. |
|---|---|---|---|---|
| 10/6/2021 | (Spain) Alejandra Salazar (Spain) Gemma Triay | 6–0 / 6–2 | (Spain) Lorena Rufo (Spain) Marta Talavan | |
| 10/6/2021 | (Argentina) Delfina Brea (Spain) Tamara Icardo | 6–4 / 6–1 | (Uruguay) Andreina de los Santos (Spain) Anna Cortiles | |
| 10/6/2021 | (Spain) Majo Sánchez (Spain) Mapi Sánchez | 6–3 / 6–1 | (Spain) Alba Galán (Spain) Maria Villalba | |
| 10/6/2021 | (Spain) Ariana Sánchez (Spain) Paula Josemaria | 6–1 / 6–2 | (Spain) Lucía Martínez (Spain) Verónica Virseda | |
| 10/6/2021 | (Argentina) Aranzazu Osoro (Spain) Victoria Iglesias | 6–2 / 6–4 | (Portugal) Ana Catarina Nogueira (Spain) Teresa Navarro | |
| 10/6/2021 | (Spain) Carolina Navarro (Argentina) Cecilia Reiter | 6–7 / 6–1 / 6–2 | (Spain) Nuria Vivancos (Spain) Xenia Clasca | |
| 10/6/2021 | (Spain) Patricia Llaguno (Argentina) Virginia Riera | 6–1 / 6–3 | (France) Alix Collombon (Spain) Jessica Castelló | |
| 10/6/2021 | (Spain) Bea González (Spain) Lucía Sainz | 6–4 / 6–0 | (Spain) Barbara Las Heras (Spain) Carla Mesa | |

=== Quarter-Finals ===
Men's
| Date | Winners | Score | Opponent | Ref. |
|---|---|---|---|---|
| 11/6/2021 | (Spain) Alejandro Galán (Spain) Juan Lebrón | 6–2 / 6–2 | (Argentina) Agustín Gutiérrez (Spain) Javier Martinez Vázquez | |
| 11/6/2021 | (Argentina) Martin Di Nenno (Spain) Paquito Navarro | 7–5 / 6–2 | (Argentina) Agustin Gomez Silingo (Spain) Matías Díaz | |
| 11/6/2021 | (Spain) Javier Ruiz (Spain) Uri Botello | 6–4 / 3–6 / 6–0 | (Argentina) Federico Chingotto (Argentina) Juan Tello | |
| 11/6/2021 | (Argentina) Agustín Tapia (Brazil) Pablo Lima | 7–5 / 7–5 | (Spain) Alejandro Ruiz (Argentina) Franco Stupaczuk | |

Women's
| Date | Winners | Score | Opponent | Ref. |
|---|---|---|---|---|
| 11/6/2021 | (Spain) Alejandra Salazar (Spain) Gemma Triay | W.O. | (Argentina) Delfina Brea (Spain) Tamara Icardo | |
| 11/6/2021 | (Spain) Ariana Sánchez (Spain) Paula Josemaria | 6–7 / 6–1 / 6–3 | (Spain) Majo Sánchez (Spain) Mapi Sánchez | |
| 11/6/2021 | (Argentina) Aranzazu Osoro (Spain) Victoria Iglesias | 6–2 / 6–3 | (Spain) Carolina Navarro (Argentina) Cecilia Reiter | |
| 11/6/2021 | (Spain) Patricia Llaguno (Argentina) Virginia Riera | 4–6 / 6–4 / 7–6 | (Spain) Bea González (Spain) Lucía Sainz | |

=== Semi-Finals ===
Men's
| Date | Winners | Score | Opponent | Ref. |
|---|---|---|---|---|
| 12/6/2021 | (Spain) Alejandro Galán (Spain) Juan Lebrón | 7–5 / 6–4 | (Argentina) Martin Di Nenno (Spain) Paquito Navarro | |
| 12/6/2021 | (Argentina) Agustín Tapia (Brazil) Pablo Lima | 7–6 / 4–1 / W.O. | (Spain) Javier Ruiz (Spain) Uri Botello | |

Women's
| Date | Winners | Score | Opponent | Ref. |
|---|---|---|---|---|
| 12/6/2021 | (Spain) Ariana Sánchez (Spain) Paula Josemaria | 6–1 / 5–7 / 6–2 | (Spain) Alejandra Salazar (Spain) Gemma Triay | |
| 12/6/2021 | (Spain) Patricia Llaguno (Argentina) Virginia Riera | 6–3 / 6–1 | (Argentina) Aranzazu Osoro (Spain) Victoria Iglesias | |

=== Finals ===
Men's
| Date | Winners | Score | Opponent | Ref. |
|---|---|---|---|---|
| 13/6/2021 | (Spain) Alejandro Galán (Spain) Juan Lebrón | 7–6 / 6–2 | (Argentina) Agustín Tapia (Brazil) Pablo Lima | |

Women's
| Date | Winners | Score | Opponent | Ref. |
|---|---|---|---|---|
| 13/6/2021 | (Spain) Ariana Sánchez (Spain) Paula Josemaria | 6–2 / 6–3 | (Spain) Patricia Llaguno (Argentina) Virginia Riera | |
