= 2021 WPT Vigo Open =

World Padel Tour tournament held in Vigo, Spain

- Date: 2 – 9 May
- Edition: 2nd
- Category: Open
- Location: Vigo, Spain
- Venue: Centro Deportivo de As Travesas

Champions
- Men's doubles: (Argentina) Fernando Belasteguín (Argentina) Sanyo Gutiérrez
- Women's doubles: (Spain) Patricia Llaguno (Argentina) Virginia Riera

Chronology

The 2021 Vigo Open (officially 2021 World Padel Tour Cupra Vigo Open) was the third tournament of the ninth season organized by World Padel Tour, the most prestigious padel circuit at the time.

In the women's category, a pair outside the top 4 reached the final for the first time this season. The first finalists were the number one ranked pair, Alejandra Salazar and Gemma Triay, who eliminated Delfina Brea and Tamara Icardo in the semi-final. Their opponents emerged from the match between two pairs that had eliminated the second and fourth ranked pairs in previous rounds, with Patricia Llaguno and Virginia Riera eliminating Aranzazu Osoro and Victoria Iglesias to reach the final. In the final, Llaguno and Riera defeated Triay and Salazar in three sets, winning their first title of the season and their first as a pair. With this victory, Riera won her first title at the highest professional level, while Llaguno won her first title since 2016 and her first in Vigo.

In the men's category, the world's number two and number four ranked pairs reached the final. The first finalists were Martín Di Nenno and Paquito Navarro, who defeated the world number ones, Alejandro Galán and Juan Lebrón, in the semifinals. Their opponents were the number two ranked pair, Fernando Belasteguín and Sanyo Gutiérrez, who beat the third ranked pair, Agustín Tapia and Pablo Lima, in three sets to reach the final. In the final, Belasteguín and Gutiérrez defeated Di Nenno and Navarro in three sets to win their second title of the season. With the victory, Gutiérrez successfully defended the title won in 2019, while Belasteguín won his first title in Vigo.

== Head-to-head record between teams ranked in the top 4 during the season ==
=== Men's ===
Record	Galán–Lebrón	Belasteguín–Sanyo	Lima–Tapia	Di Nenno–Paquito
Galán–Lebrón	—	—	—	0–1
Belasteguín–Sanyo	—	—	1–0	1–0
Lima–Tapia	—	0–1	—	—
Di Nenno–Paquito	1–0	0–1	—	—

=== Women's ===
Record	Gemma–Salazar	Ariana–Josemaria	Marrero–Ortega	Bea–Lucia
Gemma–Salazar	—	1–0	—	0–1
Ariana–Josemaria	0–1	—	—	2–0
Marrero–Ortega	—	—	—	—
Bea–Lucia	1–0	0–2	—	—

== Draws ==
=== Men's Bracket ===
Round of 32
1	(Spain) Galán / (Spain) Lebrón
Bye
(Spain) F. Gil Morales / (Spain) S. Alba	6	6	6
(Uruguay) D. Ramos / (Spain) J. Gutiérrez	7	4	2
(Argentina) A. Gutiérrez / (Spain) J. Martinez	7	2	1
(Spain) J. Rico / (Argentina) R. Moyano	5	6	6
(Spain) Coello / (Argentina) M. Lamperti	3	2
7	(Spain) J. Ruiz / (Spain) U. Botello	6	6
8	(Argentina) A. Silingo / (Spain) M. Díaz	1	6	4
(Spain) J. Leal / (Spain) M. Semmler	6	4	6
(Spain) J. Barahona / (Spain) M. Piñeiro	6	6
(Spain) E. Alonso / (Spain) J. Moya	3	3
(Spain) Á. Cepero / (Spain) J. Mieres	6	6	4
(Argentina) A. Allemandi / (Spain) P. Lijó	7	4	6
Bye
4	(Argentina) Di Nenno / (Spain) Paquito
3	(Brazil) Lima / (Argentina) Tapia
Bye
(Spain) J. Garrido / (Argentina) J.C. Belluati	6	6
(Spain) J.G. Diestro / (Spain) P. Fernández	2	1
(Spain) I. Ramírez / (Spain) M. Yanguas	3	6	6
(Spain) C. Fuster / (Spain) G. Rubio	6	4	0
(France) B. Tison / (Spain) T. Zapata	4	2
5	(Spain) A. Ruiz / (Argentina) Stupaczuk	6	6
6	(Argentina) Chingotto / (Argentina) J. Tello	3	4
(Spain) Coki / (Spain) J.M. Díaz	6	6
(Spain) J. Rico / (Spain) Momo	6	5	0
(Argentina) L. Capra / (Argentina) Maxi	3	7	6
(Brazil) L. Bergamini / (Brazil) L. Campagnolo	7	6
(Argentina) D. Perino / (Spain) E. Moreno	5	3
Bye
2	(Argentina) Belasteguín / (Argentina) Sanyo

Round of 16
1	(Spain) Galán / (Spain) Lebrón	6	6
(Spain) F. Gil Morales / (Spain) S. Alba	1	0
(Spain) J. Rico / (Argentina) R. Moyano	7	6
7	(Spain) J. Ruiz / (Spain) U. Botello	6	1
(Spain) J. Leal / (Spain) M. Semmler	2	6	7
(Spain) J. Barahona / (Spain) M. Piñeiro	6	2	5
(Argentina) A. Allemandi / (Spain) P. Lijó	1	4
4	(Argentina) Di Nenno / (Spain) Paquito	6	6
3	(Brazil) Lima / (Argentina) Tapia	6	6
(Spain) J. Garrido / (Argentina) J.C. Belluati	3	4
(Spain) I. Ramírez / (Spain) M. Yanguas	0	4
5	(Spain) A. Ruiz / (Argentina) Stupaczuk	6	6
(Spain) Coki / (Spain) J.M. Díaz	1	3
(Argentina) L. Capra / (Argentina) Maxi	6	6
(Brazil) L. Bergamini / (Brazil) L. Campagnolo	5	5
2	(Argentina) Belasteguín / (Argentina) Sanyo	7	7

Quarter-Final
1	(Spain) Galán / (Spain) Lebrón	6	6
(Spain) J. Rico / (Argentina) R. Moyano	2	2
(Spain) J. Leal / (Spain) M. Semmler	2	2
4	(Argentina) Di Nenno / (Spain) Paquito	6	6
3	(Brazil) Lima / (Argentina) Tapia	7	6
5	(Spain) A. Ruiz / (Argentina) Stupaczuk	6	3
(Argentina) L. Capra / (Argentina) Maxi	6	3	2
2	(Argentina) Belasteguín / (Argentina) Sanyo	3	6	6

Semi-Finals
1	(Spain) Galán / (Spain) Lebrón	6	3	4
4	(Argentina) Di Nenno / (Spain) Paquito	2	6	6
3	(Brazil) Lima / (Argentina) Tapia	6	4	2
2	(Argentina) Belasteguín / (Argentina) Sanyo	4	6	6

Finals
4	(Argentina) Di Nenno / (Spain) Paquito	6	4	2
2	(Argentina) Belasteguín / (Argentina) Sanyo	4	6	6

=== Women's Bracket ===
Round of 32
1	(Spain) Gemma / (Spain) Salazar
Bye
(Portugal) A.C. Nogueira / (Spain) T. Navarro	4	6	4
(Spain) L. Martínez / (Spain) V. Virseda	6	4	6
(Argentina) C. Jensen / (Spain) S. Bellver	2	3
(Argentina) C. Tenorio / (Argentina) J. Bidahorria	6	6
(Spain) A. Soriano / (Spain) E. Ramirez	6	3
5	(Spain) Majo / (Spain) Mapi	7	6
8	(Spain) C. Navarro / (Argentina) C. Reiter	6	3	2
(France) A. Collombon / (Spain) J. Castelló	1	6	6
(Spain) N. Vivancos / (Spain) X. Clasca	2	1
(Argentina) D. Brea / (Spain) T. Icardo	6	6
(Argentina) N. Brito / (Spain) N. Traviesa	2	0
(Spain) A. Galán / (Spain) M. Villalba	6	6
Bye
3	(Spain) M. Marrero / (Spain) M. Ortega
4	(Spain) Bea González / (Spain) L. Sainz
Bye
(Spain) A. Blanco / (Spain) M. Merino	1	3
(Spain) A. Martínez / (Spain) S. Hernández	6	6
(Spain) I. Domínguez / (Spain) L. Alonso	3	2
(Spain) L. Rufo / (Spain) M. Talavan	6	6
(Spain) B. Las Heras / (Spain) C. Mesa	4	1
6	(Spain) P. Llaguno / (Argentina) V. Riera	6	6
7	(Spain) E. Amatriain / (Portugal) S. Araújo	6	6
(Spain) J. Velasco / (Spain) N. Canovas	1	3
(Spain) E. Carnicero / (Brazil) R. Piltcher	6	4	6
(Spain) A. Cortiles / (Spain) A.F. de Ossó	3	6	3
(Argentina) A. Osoro / (Spain) V. Iglesias	6	6
(Spain) B. Caldera / (Spain) C. Goenaga	0	3
Bye
2	(Spain) Ariana / (Spain) P. Josemaria

Round of 16
1	(Spain) Gemma / (Spain) Salazar	7	6
(Spain) L. Martínez / (Spain) V. Virseda	5	2
(Argentina) C. Tenorio / (Argentina) J. Bidahorria	1	1
5	(Spain) Majo / (Spain) Mapi	6	6
(France) A. Collombon / (Spain) J. Castelló	0	2
(Argentina) D. Brea / (Spain) T. Icardo	6	6
(Spain) A. Galán / (Spain) M. Villalba	5	3
3	(Spain) M. Marrero / (Spain) M. Ortega	7	6
4	(Spain) Bea González / (Spain) L. Sainz	6	6
(Spain) A. Martínez / (Spain) S. Hernández	1	2
(Spain) L. Rufo / (Spain) M. Talavan	1	0
6	(Spain) P. Llaguno / (Argentina) V. Riera	6	6
7	(Spain) E. Amatriain / (Portugal) S. Araújo	7	6
(Spain) E. Carnicero / (Brazil) R. Piltcher	6	4
(Argentina) A. Osoro / (Spain) V. Iglesias	6	6
2	(Spain) Ariana / (Spain) P. Josemaria	3	4

Quarter-Final
1	(Spain) Gemma / (Spain) Salazar	6	5	6
5	(Spain) Majo / (Spain) Mapi	4	7	3
(Argentina) D. Brea / (Spain) T. Icardo	6	6	6
3	(Spain) M. Marrero / (Spain) M. Ortega	3	7	4
4	(Spain) Bea González / (Spain) L. Sainz	4	0
6	(Spain) P. Llaguno / (Argentina) V. Riera	6	6
7	(Spain) E. Amatriain / (Portugal) S. Araújo	6	0	1
(Argentina) A. Osoro / (Spain) V. Iglesias	4	6	6

Semi-Finals
1	(Spain) Gemma / (Spain) Salazar	6	6
(Argentina) D. Brea / (Spain) T. Icardo	1	0
6	(Spain) P. Llaguno / (Argentina) V. Riera	6	6
(Argentina) A. Osoro / (Spain) V. Iglesias	1	3

Finals
1	(Spain) Gemma / (Spain) Salazar	6	3	5
6	(Spain) P. Llaguno / (Argentina) V. Riera	2	6	7

== Results ==
=== Round of 32 ===
Men's
Date	Winners	Score	Opponent	Ref.
12/5/2021	(Spain) Francisco Gil Morales (Spain) Sergio Alba	6–7 / 6–4 / 6–2	(Uruguay) Diego Ramos (Spain) Jorge Ruiz Gutiérrez	
12/5/2021	(Spain) José Rico (Argentina) Ramiro Moyano	5–7 / 6–2 / 6–1	(Argentina) Agustín Gutiérrez (Spain) Javier Martinez Vázquez	
12/5/2021	(Spain) Javier Ruiz (Spain) Uri Botello	6–3 / 6–2	(Spain) Arturo Coello (Argentina) Miguel Lamperti	
12/5/2021	(Spain) Javi Leal (Spain) Miguel Semmler	6–1 / 4–6 / 6–4	(Argentina) Agustin Gomez Silingo (Spain) Matías Díaz	
12/5/2021	(Spain) Javier Barahona (Spain) Martin Sánchez Piñeiro	6–3 / 6–3	(Spain) Eduardo Alonso (Spain) Jesús Moya	
12/5/2021	(Argentina) Adrián Allemandi (Spain) Pablo Lijó	7–6 / 4–6 / 6–4	(Spain) Álvaro Cepero (Spain) Juani Mieres	
12/5/2021	(Spain) Javi Garrido (Argentina) Juan Cruz Belluati	6–2 / 6–1	(Spain) José García Diestro (Spain) Pincho Fernández	
12/5/2021	(Spain) Iván Ramírez (Spain) Mike Yanguas	3–6 / 6–4 / 6–0	(Spain) Christian Fuster (Spain) Gonzalo Rubio	
12/5/2021	(Spain) Alejandro Ruiz (Argentina) Franco Stupaczuk	6–4 / 6–2	(France) Benjamin Tison (Spain) Teodoro Zapata	
12/5/2021	(Spain) Coki Nieto (Spain) Juan Martín Díaz	6–3 / 6–4	(Argentina) Federico Chingotto (Argentina) Juan Tello	
12/5/2021	(Argentina) Lucho Capra (Argentina) Maxi Sánchez	3–6 / 7–5 / 6–0	(Spain) Javier Rico (Spain) Momo González	
12/5/2021	(Brazil) Lucas Bergamini (Brazil) Lucas Campagnolo	7–5 / 6–3	(Argentina) Denis Perino (Spain) Ernesto Moreno	

Women's
Date	Winners	Score	Opponent	Ref.
12/5/2021	(Spain) Lucía Martínez (Spain) Verónica Virseda	6–4 / 4–6 / 6–4	(Portugal) Ana Catarina Nogueira (Spain) Teresa Navarro	
12/5/2021	(Argentina) Catalina Tenorio (Argentina) Julieta Bidahorria	6–2 / 6–3	(Argentina) Claudia Jensen (Spain) Sandra Bellver	
12/5/2021	(Spain) Majo Sánchez (Spain) Mapi Sánchez	7–6 / 6–3	(Spain) Arantxa Soriano (Spain) Elena Ramirez	
12/5/2021	(France) Alix Collombon (Spain) Jessica Castelló	1–6 / 6–3 / 6–2	(Spain) Carolina Navarro (Argentina) Cecilia Reiter	
12/5/2021	(Argentina) Delfina Brea (Spain) Tamara Icardo	6–2 / 6–1	(Spain) Nuria Vivancos (Spain) Xenia Clasca	
12/5/2021	(Spain) Alba Galán (Spain) Maria Villalba	6–2 / 6–0	(Argentina) Nela Brito (Spain) Nicole Traviesa	
12/5/2021	(Spain) Araceli Martínez (Spain) Sandra Hernández	6–1 / 6–3	(Spain) Alicia Blanco Rojo (Spain) Melania Merino	
12/5/2021	(Spain) Lorena Rufo (Spain) Marta Talavan	6–3 / 6–2	(Spain) Isabel Domínguez (Spain) Lorena Alonso	
12/5/2021	(Spain) Patricia Llaguno (Argentina) Virginia Riera	6–4 / 6–1	(Spain) Barbara Las Heras (Spain) Carla Mesa	
12/5/2021	(Spain) Elisabeth Amatriain (Portugal) Sofia Araújo	6–1 / 6–3	(Spain) Jimena Velasco (Spain) Noa Canovas	
12/5/2021	(Spain) Esther Carnicero (Brazil) Raquel Piltcher	6–3 / 4–6 / 6–3	(Spain) Anna Cortiles (Spain) Ana Fernández de Ossó	
12/5/2021	(Argentina) Aranzazu Osoro (Spain) Victoria Iglesias	6–0 / 6–3	(Spain) Beatriz Caldera (Spain) Carmen Goenaga	

=== Round of 16 ===
Men's
Date	Winners	Score	Opponent	Ref.
13/5/2021	(Spain) Alejandro Galán (Spain) Juan Lebrón	6–1 / 6–0	(Spain) Francisco Gil Morales (Spain) Sergio Alba	
13/5/2021	(Spain) José Rico (Argentina) Ramiro Moyano	7–6 / 6–1	(Spain) Javier Ruiz (Spain) Uri Botello	
13/5/2021	(Spain) Javi Leal (Spain) Miguel Semmler	2–6 / 6–2 / 7–5	(Spain) Javier Barahona (Spain) Martin Sánchez Piñeiro	
13/5/2021	(Argentina) Martin Di Nenno (Spain) Paquito Navarro	6–1 / 6–4	(Argentina) Adrián Allemandi (Spain) Pablo Lijó	
13/5/2021	(Argentina) Agustín Tapia (Brazil) Pablo Lima	6–3 / 6–4	(Spain) Javi Garrido (Argentina) Juan Cruz Belluati	
13/5/2021	(Spain) Alejandro Ruiz (Argentina) Franco Stupaczuk	6–0 / 6–4	(Spain) Iván Ramírez (Spain) Mike Yanguas	
13/5/2021	(Argentina) Lucho Capra (Argentina) Maxi Sánchez	6–1 / 6–3	(Spain) Coki Nieto (Spain) Juan Martín Díaz	
13/5/2021	(Argentina) Fernando Belasteguín (Argentina) Sanyo Gutiérrez	7–5 / 7–5	(Brazil) Lucas Bergamini (Brazil) Lucas Campagnolo	

Women's
Date	Winners	Score	Opponent	Ref.
13/5/2021	(Spain) Alejandra Salazar (Spain) Gemma Triay	7–5 / 6–2	(Spain) Lucía Martínez (Spain) Verónica Virseda	
13/5/2021	(Spain) Majo Sánchez (Spain) Mapi Sánchez	6–1 / 6–1	(Argentina) Catalina Tenorio (Argentina) Julieta Bidahorria	
13/5/2021	(Argentina) Delfina Brea (Spain) Tamara Icardo	6–0 / 6–2	(France) Alix Collombon (Spain) Jessica Castelló	
13/5/2021	(Spain) Marta Marrero (Spain) Marta Ortega	7–5 / 6–3	(Spain) Alba Galán (Spain) Maria Villalba	
13/5/2021	(Spain) Bea González (Spain) Lucía Sainz	6–1 / 6–2	(Spain) Araceli Martínez (Spain) Sandra Hernández	
13/5/2021	(Spain) Patricia Llaguno (Argentina) Virginia Riera	6–1 / 6–0	(Spain) Lorena Rufo (Spain) Marta Talavan	
13/5/2021	(Spain) Elisabeth Amatriain (Portugal) Sofia Araújo	7–6 / 6–4	(Spain) Esther Carnicero (Brazil) Raquel Piltcher	
13/5/2021	(Argentina) Aranzazu Osoro (Spain) Victoria Iglesias	6–3 / 6–4	(Spain) Ariana Sánchez (Spain) Paula Josemaria	

=== Quarter-Finals ===
Men's
Date	Winners	Score	Opponent	Ref.
14/5/2021	(Spain) Alejandro Galán (Spain) Juan Lebrón	6–2 / 6–2	(Spain) José Rico (Argentina) Ramiro Moyano	
14/5/2021	(Argentina) Martin Di Nenno (Spain) Paquito Navarro	6–2 / 6–2	(Spain) Javi Leal (Spain) Miguel Semmler	
14/5/2021	(Argentina) Agustín Tapia (Brazil) Pablo Lima	7–6 / 6–3	(Spain) Alejandro Ruiz (Argentina) Franco Stupaczuk	
14/5/2021	(Argentina) Fernando Belasteguín (Argentina) Sanyo Gutiérrez	3–6 / 6–3 / 6–2	(Argentina) Lucho Capra (Argentina) Maxi Sánchez	

Women's
Date	Winners	Score	Opponent	Ref.
14/5/2021	(Spain) Alejandra Salazar (Spain) Gemma Triay	6–4 / 5–7 / 6–3	(Spain) Majo Sánchez (Spain) Mapi Sánchez	
14/5/2021	(Argentina) Delfina Brea (Spain) Tamara Icardo	6–3 / 6–7 / 6–4	(Spain) Marta Marrero (Spain) Marta Ortega	
14/5/2021	(Spain) Patricia Llaguno (Argentina) Virginia Riera	6–4 / 6–0	(Spain) Bea González (Spain) Lucía Sainz	
14/5/2021	(Argentina) Aranzazu Osoro (Spain) Victoria Iglesias	4–6 / 6–0 / 6–1	(Spain) Elisabeth Amatriain (Portugal) Sofia Araújo	

=== Semi-Finals ===
Men's
Date	Winners	Score	Opponent	Ref.
15/5/2021	(Argentina) Martin Di Nenno (Spain) Paquito Navarro	2–6 / 6–3 / 6–4	(Spain) Alejandro Galán (Spain) Juan Lebrón	
15/5/2021	(Argentina) Fernando Belasteguín (Argentina) Sanyo Gutiérrez	4–6 / 6–4 / 6–2	(Argentina) Agustín Tapia (Brazil) Pablo Lima	

Women's
Date	Winners	Score	Opponent	Ref.
15/5/2021	(Spain) Alejandra Salazar (Spain) Gemma Triay	6–1 / 6–0	(Argentina) Delfina Brea (Spain) Tamara Icardo	
15/5/2021	(Spain) Patricia Llaguno (Argentina) Virginia Riera	6–1 / 6–3	(Argentina) Aranzazu Osoro (Spain) Victoria Iglesias	

=== Finals ===
Men's
Date	Winners	Score	Opponent	Ref.
16/5/2021	(Argentina) Fernando Belasteguín (Argentina) Sanyo Gutiérrez	4–6 / 6–4 / 6–2	(Argentina) Martin Di Nenno (Spain) Paquito Navarro	

Women's
Date	Winners	Score	Opponent	Ref.
16/5/2021	(Spain) Patricia Llaguno (Argentina) Virginia Riera	2–6 / 6–3 / 7–5	(Spain) Alejandra Salazar (Spain) Gemma Triay	
