= 2021 WPT Las Rozas Open =

World Padel Tour tournament held in Las Rozas, Spain

- Date: 19 – 25 July
- Edition: 3rd
- Category: Open
- Location: Las Rozas, Spain
- Venue: Centro Multiusos Las Rozas

Champions
- Men's doubles: (Argentina) Agustín Tapia (Brazil) Pablo Lima
- Women's doubles: (Spain) Ariana Sánchez (Spain) Paula Josemaría

Chronology

The 2021 Las Rozas Open (officially 2021 World Padel Tour Estrella Damm Las Rozas Open) was the eight tournament of the ninth season organized by World Padel Tour, the most prestigious padel circuit at the time.

In the women's category, the first finalists were the Martas, Marta Marrero and Marta Ortega, who after eliminating the world's number one pair, Alejandra Salazar and Gemma Triay, in the quarterfinals, eliminated Delfina Brea and Tamara Icardo in the semifinals. Their opponents were the second-ranked pair, Ariana Sánchez and Paula Josemaria, who eliminated the third-ranked pair, Bea González and Lucia Sainz, to reach the final. In the decisive match, Ariana and Paula defeated Marrero and Ortega without difficulty, winning their third title of the season and their first in Las Rozas.

In the men's category, for the first time this season the second and third ranked pairs reached the final. The first finalists were the third-ranked pair, Agustín Tapia and Pablo Lima, who eliminated the world number ones, Alejandro Galán and Juan Lebrón, to reach the final. Their opponents were the number two ranked pair, Fernando Belasteguín and Sanyo Gutiérrez, who eliminated Lucho Capra and Maxi Sánchez in the semi-final. In the decisive match, Lima and Tapia defeated Belasteguín and Sanyo in two sets to win the first title of the tournament. With this victory, Tapia won his first title in Las Rozas while Lima won his second (having already won in 2016).

== Head-to-head record between teams ranked in the top 4 during the season ==
=== Men's ===
Record	Galán–Lebrón	Belasteguín–Sanyo	Lima–Tapia	Chingotto–Tello	Former Pairs	Di Nenno–Paquito
Galán–Lebrón	—	0–1	1–1	1–1		3–1
Belasteguín–Sanyo	1–0	—	1–1	1–0		1–0
Lima–Tapia	1–1	1–1	—	1–0		0–1
Chingotto–Tello	1–1	0–1	0–1	—		2–0
Former Pairs
Di Nenno–Paquito	1–3	0–1	1–0	0–2		—

=== Women's ===
Record	Gemma–Salazar	Ariana–Josemaria	Bea–Lucia	Llaguno–Riera	Former Pairs	Marrero–Ortega
Gemma–Salazar	—	2–1	1–1	2–1		0–1
Ariana–Josemaria	1–2	—	3–0	1–1		2–0
Bea–Lucia	1–1	0–3	—	2–3		—
Llaguno–Riera	1–2	1–1	3–2	—		—
Former Pairs
Marrero–Ortega	1–0	0–2	—	—		—

== Draws ==
=== Men's Bracket ===
Round of 32
1	(Spain) Galán / (Spain) Lebrón
Bye
Q	(Spain) J. Leal / (Spain) M. Semmler	7	6	4
(Spain) F. Gil Morales / (Spain) S. Alba	6	7	6
Q	(Argentina) D. Perino / (Spain) E. Moreno	5	3
(Argentina) A. Silingo / (Spain) J. Sanz	7	6
(Spain) A. Sans / (Spain) I. Zaratiegui	4	4
6	(Spain) A. Ruiz / (Argentina) Stupaczuk	6	6
8	(Spain) J. Rico / (Spain) Momo	6	3	4
(Spain) J. Serrano / (Spain) M. Díaz	3	6	6
Q	(Spain) J. Rico / (Spain) V. Ruiz	6	6
(Spain) C. Fuster / (Spain) J. Martinez	3	1
(Spain) J.G. Diestro / (Spain) P. Fernández	6	6	1
LL	(Spain) J. Gutiérrez / (Spain) S. Oria	4	7	6
Bye
3	(Brazil) Lima / (Argentina) Tapia
4	(Argentina) Chingotto / (Argentina) J. Tello
Bye
LL	(Spain) Á. Cepero / (Spain) A. Arroyo	3	4
(Spain) J.M. Díaz / (Spain) P. Lijó	6	6
Q	(Spain) N. Gadea / (Spain) T. Zapata	2	6	3
LL	(Spain) A. Luque / (Spain) M. Del Castillo	6	1	6
(Spain) G. Rubio / (Spain) I. Ramírez	4	6	3
7	(Argentina) L. Capra / (Argentina) Maxi	6	4	6
5	(Argentina) Di Nenno / (Spain) Paquito	4	6	6
(Spain) Coello / (Spain) J. Ruiz	6	2	3
(Spain) J. Mieres / (Spain) M. Piñeiro	1	6	3
(Argentina) M. Lamperti / (Spain) M. Yanguas	6	4	6
(Spain) J. Garrido / (Argentina) J.C. Belluati	6	6
(Argentina) A. Allemandi / (Spain) Coki	4	4
Bye
2	(Argentina) Belasteguín / (Argentina) Sanyo

Round of 16
1	(Spain) Galán / (Spain) Lebrón	6	6
(Spain) F. Gil Morales / (Spain) S. Alba	4	4
(Argentina) A. Silingo / (Spain) J. Sanz	6	2
6	(Spain) A. Ruiz / (Argentina) Stupaczuk	7	6
(Spain) J. Serrano / (Spain) M. Díaz
Q	(Spain) J. Rico / (Spain) V. Ruiz	*
LL	(Spain) J. Gutiérrez / (Spain) S. Oria	2	3
3	(Brazil) Lima / (Argentina) Tapia	6	6
4	(Argentina) Chingotto / (Argentina) J. Tello	4	6	6
(Spain) J.M. Díaz / (Spain) P. Lijó	6	3	2
(Spain) A. Luque / (Spain) M. Del Castillo
7	(Argentina) L. Capra / (Argentina) Maxi	*
5	(Argentina) Di Nenno / (Spain) Paquito	4	6	6
(Argentina) M. Lamperti / (Spain) M. Yanguas	6	3	7
(Spain) J. Garrido / (Argentina) J.C. Belluati	5	6	3
2	(Argentina) Belasteguín / (Argentina) Sanyo	7	2	6

Quarter-Final
1	(Spain) Galán / (Spain) Lebrón	6	3	6
6	(Spain) A. Ruiz / (Argentina) Stupaczuk	1	6	4
(Spain) J. Rico / (Spain) V. Ruiz	1	6	2
3	(Brazil) Lima / (Argentina) Tapia	6	3	6
4	(Argentina) Chingotto / (Argentina) J. Tello	2	6
7	(Argentina) L. Capra / (Argentina) Maxi	6	7
(Argentina) M. Lamperti / (Spain) M. Yanguas	7	5	5
2	(Argentina) Belasteguín / (Argentina) Sanyo	6	7	7

Semi-Finals
1	(Spain) Galán / (Spain) Lebrón	4	4
3	(Brazil) Lima / (Argentina) Tapia	6	6
7	(Argentina) L. Capra / (Argentina) Maxi	6	6	4
2	(Argentina) Belasteguín / (Argentina) Sanyo	4	7	6

Finals
3	(Brazil) Lima / (Argentina) Tapia	6	6
2	(Argentina) Belasteguín / (Argentina) Sanyo	1	4

=== Women's Bracket ===
Round of 32
1	(Spain) Gemma / (Spain) Salazar
Bye
(Argentina) C. Jensen / (Spain) S. Bellver	6	3	6
(Spain) A. Cortiles / (Spain) P. Martinez	3	6	3
Q	(Spain) J. Bautista / (Spain) S. Pujals	3	6	6
Q	(Spain) A.F. Ossó / (Argentina) N. Brito	6	3	3
(Spain) B. Las Heras / (Spain) C. Mes	2	6	3
5	(Spain) M. Marrero / (Spain) M. Ortega	6	3	6
6	(Argentina) D. Brea / (Spain) T. Icardo	6	6
(Spain) B. Caldera / (Spain) C. Goenaga	2	1
(Spain) C. Navarro / (Spain) E. Amatriain	6	3	6
(Spain) A. Galán / (Spain) M. Villalba	3	6	4
(Spain) L. Martínez / (Spain) V. Virseda	6	6
(Argentina) C. Tenorio / (Argentina) J. Bidahorria	0	3
Bye
4	(Spain) P. Llaguno / (Argentina) V. Riera
3	(Spain) Bea González / (Spain) L. Sainz
Bye
(Portugal) A.C. Nogueira / (Portugal) S. Araújo	6	6
(Spain) A. Martinez / (Brazil) R. Piltcher	1	1
(Spain) L. Rufo / (Spain) M. Talavan	6	4	6
(Spain) I. Domínguez / (Spain) L. Alonso	4	6	1
Q	(Spain) M. Lobo / (Spain) S. Saiz	0	6
7	(Argentina) A. Osoro / (Spain) V. Iglesias	6	7
8	(Spain) Majo / (Spain) T. Navarro	6	6
Q	(Spain) J. Velasco / (Spain) N. Canovas	3	2
(Argentina) C. Reiter / (Spain) E. Carnicero	6	6
(France) A. Collombon / (Spain) J. Castelló	4	4
(Spain) A. Cantin / (Spain) A. Soriano	2	7	6
(Spain) A. Cañellas / (France) L. Godallier	6	6	3
Bye
2	(Spain) Ariana / (Spain) P. Josemaria

Round of 16
1	(Spain) Gemma / (Spain) Salazar	6	7
(Argentina) C. Jensen / (Spain) S. Bellver	2	6
Q	(Spain) J. Bautista / (Spain) S. Pujals	1	3
5	(Spain) M. Marrero / (Spain) M. Ortega	6	6
6	(Argentina) D. Brea / (Spain) T. Icardo	6	6
(Spain) C. Navarro / (Spain) E. Amatriain	1	2
(Spain) L. Martínez / (Spain) V. Virseda	6	1	6
4	(Spain) P. Llaguno / (Argentina) V. Riera	4	6	1
3	(Spain) Bea González / (Spain) L. Sainz	6	6
(Portugal) A.C. Nogueira / (Portugal) S. Araújo	1	1
(Spain) L. Rufo / (Spain) M. Talavan	0	3
7	(Argentina) A. Osoro / (Spain) V. Iglesias	6	6
8	(Spain) Majo / (Spain) T. Navarro	6	6
(Argentina) C. Reiter / (Spain) E. Carnicero	2	3
(Spain) A. Cantin / (Spain) A. Soriano	4	1
2	(Spain) Ariana / (Spain) P. Josemaria	6	6

Quarter-Final
1	(Spain) Gemma / (Spain) Salazar	5	6	6
5	(Spain) M. Marrero / (Spain) M. Ortega	7	3	7
6	(Argentina) D. Brea / (Spain) T. Icardo	6	4	6
(Spain) L. Martínez / (Spain) V. Virseda	2	6	1
3	(Spain) Bea González / (Spain) L. Sainz	6	6	7
7	(Argentina) A. Osoro / (Spain) V. Iglesias	4	7	6
8	(Spain) Majo / (Spain) T. Navarro
2	(Spain) Ariana / (Spain) P. Josemaria	*

Semi-Finals
5	(Spain) M. Marrero / (Spain) M. Ortega	6	4	6
6	(Argentina) D. Brea / (Spain) T. Icardo	3	6	4
3	(Spain) Bea González / (Spain) L. Sainz	4	5
2	(Spain) Ariana / (Spain) P. Josemaria	6	7

Finals
5	(Spain) M. Marrero / (Spain) M. Ortega	2	1
2	(Spain) Ariana / (Spain) P. Josemaria	6	6

== Results ==
=== Round of 32 ===
Men's
Date	Winners	Score	Opponent	Ref.
21/7/2021	(Spain) Francisco Gil Morales (Spain) Sergio Alba	6–7 / 7–6 / 6–4	(Spain) Javi Leal (Spain) Miguel Semmler	
21/7/2021	(Argentina) Agustin Gómez Silingo (Spain) Jon Sanz	7–5 / 6–3	(Argentina) Denis Perino (Spain) Ernesto Moreno	
21/7/2021	(Spain) Alejandro Ruiz (Argentina) Franco Stupaczuk	6–4 / 6–4	(Spain) Anton Sans (Spain) Iñigo Zaratiegui	
21/7/2021	(Spain) Jose Sánchez Serrano (Spain) Matías Díaz	3–6 / 6–3 / 6–4	(Spain) Javier Rico (Spain) Momo González	
21/7/2021	(Spain) José Rico (Spain) Victor Ruiz	6–3 / 6–1	(Spain) Christian Fuster (Spain) Javier Martinez Vazuquez	
21/7/2021	(Spain) Jorge Ruiz Gutiérrez (Spain) Salvador Oria	4–6 / 7–6 / 6–1	(Spain) José García Diestro (Spain) Pincho Fernández	
21/7/2021	(Spain) Juan Martín Díaz (Spain) Pablo Lijó	6–3 / 6–4	(Spain) Alejandro Arroyo (Spain) Álvaro Cepero	
21/7/2021	(Spain) Antonio Luque (Spain) Mario Del Castillo	6–2 / 1–6 / 6–3	(Spain) Nacho Gadea (Spain) Teodoro Zapata	
21/7/2021	(Argentina) Lucho Capra (Argentina) Maxi Sánchez	6–4 / 4–6 / 6–3	(Spain) Gonzalo Rubio (Spain) Iván Ramírez	
21/7/2021	(Argentina) Martin Di Nenno (Spain) Paquito Navarro	4–6 / 6–2 / 6–3	(Spain) Arturo Coello (Spain) Javier Ruiz	
21/7/2021	(Argentina) Miguel Lamperti (Spain) Miguel Yanguas	6–1 / 4–6 / 6–3	(Spain) Juani Mieres (Spain) Martin Sánchez Piñeiro	
21/7/2021	(Spain) Javi Garrido (Argentina) Juan Cruz Belluati	6–4 / 6–4	(Argentina) Adrián Allemandi (Spain) Coki Nieto	

Women's
Date	Winners	Score	Opponent	Ref.
21/7/2021	(Argentina) Claudia Jensen (Spain) Sandra Bellver	6–3 / 3–6 / 6–3	(Spain) Anna Cortiles (Spain) Patricia Martinez	
21/7/2021	(Spain) Julia Polo Bautista (Spain) Sara Pujals	3–6 / 6–3 / 6–3	(Spain) Ana Fernández de Ossó (Argentina) Nela Brito	
21/7/2021	(Spain) Marta Marrero (Spain) Marta Ortega	6–2 / 3–6 / 6–3	(Spain) Barbara Las Heras (Spain) Carla Mesa	
21/7/2021	(Argentina) Delfina Brea (Spain) Tamara Icardo	6–2 / 6–1	(Spain) Beatriz Caldera (Spain) Carmen Goenaga	
21/7/2021	(Spain) Carolina Navarro (Argentina) Cecilia Reiter	6–3 / 3–6 / 6–4	(Spain) Alba Galán (Spain) Maria Villalba	
21/7/2021	(Spain) Lucía Martínez (Spain) Verónica Virseda	6–0 / 6–3	(Argentina) Catalina Tenorio (Argentina) Julieta Bidahorria	
21/7/2021	(Portugal) Ana Catarina Nogueira (Portugal) Sofia Araújo	6–1 / 6–1	(Spain) Araceli Martinez (Brazil) Raquel Piltcher	
21/7/2021	(Spain) Lorena Rufo (Spain) Marta Talavan	6–4 / 4–6 / 6–1	(Spain) Isabel Domínguez (Spain) Lorena Alonso	
21/7/2021	(Argentina) Aranzazu Osoro (Spain) Victoria Iglesias	6–0 / 7–6	(Spain) Marina Lobo (Spain) Sofía Saiz	
21/7/2021	(Spain) Majo Sánchez (Spain) Teresa Navarro	6–3 / 6–2	(Spain) Jimena Velasco (Spain) Noa Canovas	
21/7/2021	(Argentina) Cecilia Reiter (Spain) Esther Carnicero	6–4 / 6–4	(France) Alix Collombon (Spain) Jessica Castelló	
21/7/2021	(Spain) Angela Caro Cantin (Spain) Arantxa Soriano	2–6 / 7–6 / 6–3	(Spain) Ariadna Cañellas (France) Lea Godallier	

=== Round of 16 ===
Men's
Date	Winners	Score	Opponent	Ref.
22/7/2021	(Spain) Alejandro Galán (Spain) Juan Lebrón	6–4 / 6–4	(Spain) Francisco Gil Morales (Spain) Sergio Alba	
22/7/2021	(Spain) Alejandro Ruiz (Argentina) Franco Stupaczuk	7–6 / 6–2	(Argentina) Agustin Gómez Silingo (Spain) Jon Sanz	
22/7/2021	(Spain) José Rico (Spain) Victor Ruiz	W.O.	(Spain) Jose Sánchez Serrano (Spain) Matías Díaz	
22/7/2021	(Argentina) Agustín Tapia (Brazil) Pablo Lima	6–2 / 6–3	(Spain) Jorge Ruiz Gutiérrez (Spain) Salvador Oria	
22/7/2021	(Argentina) Federico Chingotto (Argentina) Juan Tello	4–6 / 6–3 / 6–2	(Spain) Juan Martín Díaz (Spain) Pablo Lijó	
22/7/2021	(Argentina) Lucho Capra (Argentina) Maxi Sánchez	W.O.	(Spain) Antonio Luque (Spain) Mario Del Castillo	
22/7/2021	(Argentina) Miguel Lamperti (Spain) Miguel Yanguas	6–4 / 3–6 / 7–6	(Argentina) Martin Di Nenno (Spain) Paquito Navarro	
22/7/2021	(Argentina) Fernando Belasteguín (Argentina) Sanyo Gutiérrez	7–5 / 2–6 / 6–3	(Spain) Javi Garrido (Argentina) Juan Cruz Belluati	

Women's
Date	Winners	Score	Opponent	Ref.
22/7/2021	(Spain) Alejandra Salazar (Spain) Gemma Triay	6–2 / 7–6	(Argentina) Claudia Jensen (Spain) Sandra Bellver	
22/7/2021	(Spain) Marta Marrero (Spain) Marta Ortega	6–1 / 6–3	(Spain) Julia Polo Bautista (Spain) Sara Pujals	
22/7/2021	(Argentina) Delfina Brea (Spain) Tamara Icardo	6–1 / 6–2	(Spain) Carolina Navarro (Argentina) Cecilia Reiter	
22/7/2021	(Spain) Lucía Martínez (Spain) Verónica Virseda	6–4 / 1–6 / 6–1	(Spain) Patricia Llaguno (Argentina) Virginia Riera	
22/7/2021	(Spain) Bea González (Spain) Lucía Sainz	6–1 / 6–1	(Portugal) Ana Catarina Nogueira (Portugal) Sofia Araújo	
22/7/2021	(Argentina) Aranzazu Osoro (Spain) Victoria Iglesias	6–0 / 6–3	(Spain) Lorena Rufo (Spain) Marta Talavan	
22/7/2021	(Spain) Majo Sánchez (Spain) Teresa Navarro	6–2 / 6–3	(Argentina) Cecilia Reiter (Spain) Esther Carnicero	
22/7/2021	(Spain) Ariana Sánchez (Spain) Paula Josemaria	6–4 / 6–1	(Spain) Angela Caro Cantin (Spain) Arantxa Soriano	

=== Quarter-Finals ===
Men's
Date	Winners	Score	Opponent	Ref.
23/7/2021	(Spain) Alejandro Galán (Spain) Juan Lebrón	6–1 / 3–6 / 6–4	(Spain) Alejandro Ruiz (Argentina) Franco Stupaczuk	
23/7/2021	(Argentina) Agustín Tapia (Brazil) Pablo Lima	6–1 / 3–6 / 6–2	(Spain) José Rico (Spain) Victor Ruiz	
23/7/2021	(Argentina) Lucho Capra (Argentina) Maxi Sánchez	6–2 / 7–6	(Argentina) Federico Chingotto (Argentina) Juan Tello	
23/7/2021	(Argentina) Fernando Belasteguín (Argentina) Sanyo Gutiérrez	6–7 / 7–5 / 7–5	(Argentina) Miguel Lamperti (Spain) Miguel Yanguas	

Women's
Date	Winners	Score	Opponent	Ref.
23/7/2021	(Spain) Marta Marrero (Spain) Marta Ortega	7–5 / 3–6 / 7–6	(Spain) Alejandra Salazar (Spain) Gemma Triay	
23/7/2021	(Argentina) Delfina Brea (Spain) Tamara Icardo	6–2 / 4–6 / 6–1	(Spain) Lucía Martínez (Spain) Verónica Virseda	
23/7/2021	(Spain) Bea González (Spain) Lucía Sainz	6–4 / 6–7 / 7–6	(Argentina) Aranzazu Osoro (Spain) Victoria Iglesias	
23/7/2021	(Spain) Ariana Sánchez (Spain) Paula Josemaria	W.O.	(Spain) Majo Sánchez (Spain) Teresa Navarro	

=== Semi-Finals ===
Men's
Date	Winners	Score	Opponent	Ref.
24/7/2021	(Argentina) Agustín Tapia (Brazil) Pablo Lima	6–4 / 6–4	(Spain) Alejandro Galán (Spain) Juan Lebrón	
24/7/2021	(Argentina) Fernando Belasteguín (Argentina) Sanyo Gutiérrez	4–6 / 7–6 / 6–4	(Argentina) Lucho Capra (Argentina) Maxi Sánchez	

Women's
Date	Winners	Score	Opponent	Ref.
24/7/2021	(Spain) Marta Marrero (Spain) Marta Ortega	6–3 / 4–6 / 6–4	(Argentina) Delfina Brea (Spain) Tamara Icardo	
24/7/2021	(Spain) Ariana Sánchez (Spain) Paula Josemaria	6–4 / 7–5	(Spain) Bea González (Spain) Lucía Sainz	

=== Finals ===
Men's
Date	Winners	Score	Opponent	Ref.
25/7/2021	(Argentina) Agustín Tapia (Brazil) Pablo Lima	6–1 / 6–4	(Argentina) Fernando Belasteguín (Argentina) Sanyo Gutiérrez	

Women's
Date	Winners	Score	Opponent	Ref.
25/7/2021	(Spain) Ariana Sánchez (Spain) Paula Josemaría	6–2 / 6–1	(Spain) Marta Marrero (Spain) Marta Ortega	
