= Alix Collombon =

French tennis player

- Country (sports): France
- Born: 17 March 1993 (age 32)
- Plays: Right (two-handed backhand)
- Prize money: $33,795

Singles
- Career record: 97–120
- Highest ranking: No. 457 (9 June 2014)

Doubles
- Career record: 27–40
- Highest ranking: No. 646 (27 October 2014)

Grand Slam doubles results
- French Open: 1R (2014)

Alix Collombon (born 17 March 1993) is a French professional padel player and former tennis player.

Her highest career singles ranking is world No. 457, achieved on 9 June 2014. The best career doubles ranking is 646, achieved on 27 October 2014.

She received a wildcard into the doubles main draw of the 2014 French Open. 2021, she made history by becoming the first French woman to reach a World Padel Tour final. She made it at the Lerma Challenger alongside Spain's Jessica Castelló. However, they lost 0–6 and 5–7 in the final. Two weeks later, they were in the final again, this time at the La Nucia Challenger, and won 6–1 and 6–3, becoming the first Frenchwomen to win a World Padel Tour title.

== ITF Circuit finals ==
$25,000 tournaments
$10,000 tournaments

=== Singles (0–2) ===
Outcome	No.	Date	Tournament	Surface	Opponent	Score
Runner-up	1.	10 March 2013	Amiens, France	Clay (i)	(France) Virginie Razzano	1–6, 0–6
Runner-up	2.	16 March 2014	Heraklion, France	Hard	(Israel) Deniz Khazaniuk	6–7^{(4–7)}, 3–6

=== Doubles (0–1) ===
Outcome	No.	Date	Tournament	Surface	Partner	Opponents	Score
Runner-up	1.	18 September 2010	Lleida, Spain	Clay	(France) Jessica Ginier	(Norway) Ulrikke Eikeri (Norway) Caroline Rohde-Moe	5–7, 0–5 ret.
